= Drive (soundtrack) =

2011 soundtrack album by Johnny Jewel and Cliff Martinez

Drive (Original Motion Picture Soundtrack)

Soundtrack album by Cliff Martinez
- Released: September 19, 2011
- Recorded: 2011
- Genre: Film soundtrack; synthwave; electronic; ambience; atmospheric; retro
- Length: 70:18
- Label: Lakeshore Records
- Producer: Cliff Martinez

Drive (Original Motion Picture Soundtrack) is the soundtrack album to the 2011 American film of the same name. Initially, Johnny Jewel was hired to compose the film's score, but producers ultimately hired Cliff Martinez to replace Jewel. The album consists of songs which is a blend of electronic, ambient and retro music.

Prior to the release of the soundtrack, the album topped iTunes charts after the highly positive critical response for the film as well as its musical score. The album was released on CD on September 19, 2011, by Lakeshore Records, which was followed by a vinyl edition of the soundtrack, marketed by Mondo, was released in June 2012. Coinciding the film's fifth anniversary, Lakeshore and Invada Records, in September 2016, released the special edition of the soundtrack. It peaked at 30th position on the US Billboard 200, and topped the soundtrack list from Billboard. Incidentally, the album also topped the soundtrack list in Official Charts Company (United Kingdom). The soundtrack also received several awards and nominations.

== Development ==
Refn chose Johnny Jewel of Desire and Chromatics to score the film. He wanted electronic music and to have it be abstract, on occasion, so viewers can see things from the Driver's perspective. As Refn was going through mixer Jewel's catalog, he picked out "Under Your Spell" and "Tick of the Clock" because he thought of Drive being a fairy tale. During Drive's climax, "A Real Hero"'s keynote melody, about becoming "a real human being, and a real hero", refrains because that is when the Driver displays both those characteristics. At first, Jewel worried that "Under Your Spell" might be too literal, but soon realized it is used in Drive "in the exact same way that I was feeling it when I wrote it. He definitely got the nuance of the song, and understood what it was supposed to mean, and he wanted to give that emotion to the viewer, that same feeling."

Thinking of music in terms of basic elements, Jewel would tell the director that for certain scenes, it should not have bass since, as an earth tone, it is usually used for a more emotional or ominous part. Jewel thought the music should be in the upper register and relaxing for the "dreamlike" scene. To help himself with the music composition process, and to conjure up melodies, the producer would highlight many phrases from the novel, then print those words in large font, and hung them on his walls or draw pictures during viewings of Drive.

Although Jewel's music was used in the score, at the last minute the studio hired composer Cliff Martinez to imitate the style and feel of Jewel's bands Chromatics and Glass Candy. Refn gave him a sampling of songs he liked and asked Martinez to emulate the sound, resulting in "a kind of retro, 80ish, synthesizer europop". Editor Mat Newman suggested Drive's opening credits song: "Nightcall" by French electronic musician Kavinsky. Most of its ethereal electronic-pop score was composed by Martinez. Refn was a particular fan of his ambient music on the Sex, Lies, and Videotape soundtrack. The score contains tracks with vintage keyboards and bluntly descriptive titles.

Jewel reworked his unused soundtrack for the film into Themes for an Imaginary Film, the debut album by his side-project Symmetry.

== Track listing ==
No.	Title	Artist(s)	Length
1.	"Nightcall" (Vincent Pierre Claude Belorgey, Guy-Manuel de Homem-Christo)	Kavinsky featuring Lovefoxxx	4:19
2.	"Under Your Spell" (Johnny Jewel)	Desire	3:52
3.	"A Real Hero" (David Grellier, Austin Garrick, Bronwyn Griffin)	College featuring Electric Youth	4:27
4.	"Oh My Love" (Riz Ortolani, Rina Ranieri)	Riz Ortolani featuring Katyna Ranieri	2:50
5.	"Tick of the Clock" (Jewel)	Chromatics	4:48
6.	"Rubber Head"	Cliff Martinez	3:08
7.	"I Drive"	Cliff Martinez	2:03
8.	"He Had a Good Time"	Cliff Martinez	1:37
9.	"They Broke His Pelvis"	Cliff Martinez	1:58
10.	"Kick Your Teeth"	Cliff Martinez	2:40
11.	"Where's the Deluxe Version?"	Cliff Martinez	5:32
12.	"See You in Four"	Cliff Martinez	2:37
13.	"After the Chase"	Cliff Martinez	5:25
14.	"Hammer"	Cliff Martinez	4:44
15.	"Wrong Floor"	Cliff Martinez	1:31
16.	"Skull Crushing"	Cliff Martinez	5:57
17.	"My Name on a Car"	Cliff Martinez	2:19
18.	"On the Beach"	Cliff Martinez	6:35
19.	"Bride of Deluxe"	Cliff Martinez	3:57

== Reception ==
Drive (Original Motion Picture Soundtrack) was released on CD on September 19, 2011, by Lakeshore Records. Prior to that, owing to viral reviews such as those found on Twitter, the soundtrack sold well on iTunes, climbing as high as number four on the sales charts. The album was released on vinyl on June 21, 2012, by Mondo. A re-scored soundtrack for the film was produced for the BBC by Zane Lowe for its television broadcast in October 2014. The soundtrack included original music from Chvrches, Banks, Bastille, Eric Prydz, SBTRKT, Bring Me the Horizon, The 1975 and Laura Mvula.

The album received positive reviews. James Verniere of the Boston Herald graded it an "A", stating, "The cool crowd isn't just watching Drive; they're listening to it, too ... The Drive soundtrack is such an integral part of the experience of the film, once you see it, you can't imagine the film without it." AllMusic reviewer James Christopher Monger selected opening track "Nightcall", "I Drive", "Hammer" and "Bride of Deluxe" as soundtrack's highlights. Mayer Nissim of Digital Spy gave it a four out of five star rating, finding it as important as the film itself. She stated the album's sequence, beginning with non-Martinez songs instead of mixing it up for a more enjoyable listening experience, cost it a star.

In September 2016, Lakeshore and Invada Records released a fifth anniversary special edition pressing of the soundtrack, featuring new liner notes and artwork. That same month, Johnny Jewel, college, Electric Youth, and Cliff Martinez discussed the impact of the soundtrack and film on their lives and contemporary music culture. Jewel told Aaron Vehling that Drive's "blend of sonic and visual nostalgia with a contemporary spin is always deadly." The soundtrack was listed on Spin magazine's list of 40 Movie Soundtracks That Changed Alternative Music.

== Charts ==
Weekly chart performance for Drive: Original Motion Picture Soundtrack
Chart (2011–2012)	Peak position
Austrian Albums (Ö3 Austria)	33
Belgian Albums (Ultratop Flanders)	28
Belgian Albums (Ultratop Wallonia)	24
Danish Albums (Hitlisten)	12
French Albums (SNEP)	13
German Albums (Offizielle Top 100)	59
Irish Compilation Albums (IRMA)	2
Norwegian Albums (VG-lista)	35
Polish Albums (ZPAV)	8
Swiss Albums (Schweizer Hitparade)	72
UK Compilation Albums (Official Charts)	12
UK Soundtrack Albums (Official Charts)	1
US Billboard 200	31
US Independent Albums (Billboard)	4
US Soundtrack Albums (Billboard)	1

Year-end chart performance for Drive: Original Motion Picture Soundtrack
Chart (2012)	Position
Belgian Albums (Ultratop Flanders)	91
Belgian Albums (Ultratop Wallonia)	96
Danish Albums (Hitlisten)	96
French Albums (SNEP)	118

== Awards and nominations ==
Award	Date of ceremony	Category	Recipients	Result	Ref.
Boston Society of Film Critics	December 12, 2011	Best Use of Music in a Film	Drive	Won (Note: Tied with The Artist)	
Chicago Film Critics Association	December 19, 2011	Best Original Score	Cliff Martinez	Won	
Critics' Choice Movie Awards	January 13, 2012	Best Score	Cliff Martinez	Nominated	
Los Angeles Film Critics Association	December 11, 2011	Best Music Score	Cliff Martinez	Runner–up	
MTV Movie Awards	June 3, 2012	Best Song from a Movie	"A Real Hero" by College featuring Electric Youth	Nominated	
Satellite Awards	December 18, 2011	Best Original Score	Cliff Martinez	Nominated	
St. Louis Film Critics Association	December 19, 2011	Best Music/Score	Cliff Martinez	Nominated	
Washington D.C. Area Film Critics Association	December 5, 2011	Best Score	Cliff Martinez	Nominated	
World Soundtrack Academy	October 20, 2012	Best Soundtrack of the Year	Cliff Martinez	Nominated	
World Soundtrack Academy	October 20, 2012	Soundtrack Composer of the Year	Cliff Martinez	Nominated	
