= List of accolades received by Drive (2011 film) =

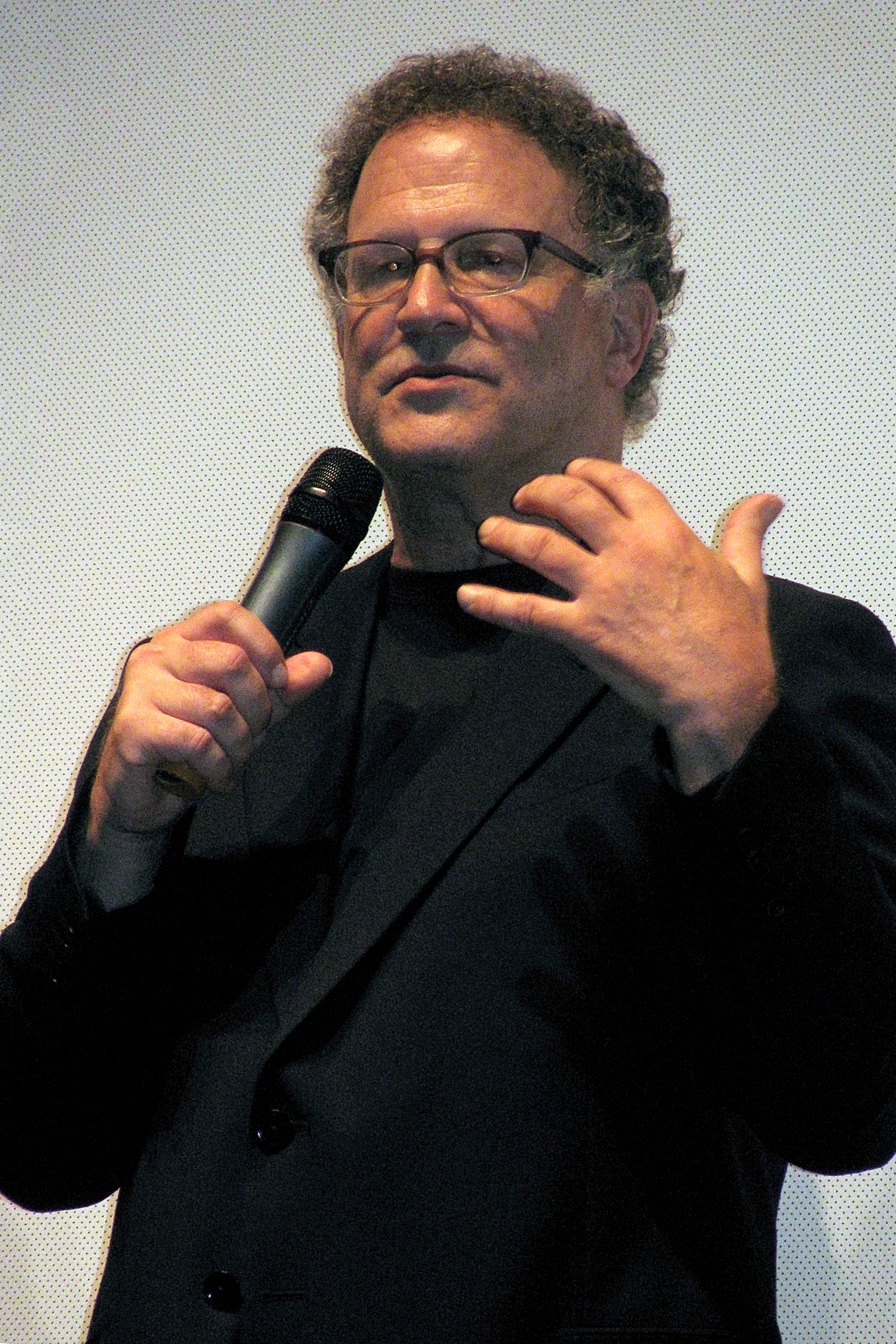
- Albert Brooks's performance gained the most attention from award groups out of the cast.
Accolades
| Award | Won | Nominated |
| Academy Awards | 0 | 1 |
| African-American Film Critics Association | 2 | 2 |
| Alliance of Women Film Journalists | 0 | 3 |
| Art Directors Guild | 0 | 1 |
| Austin Film Critics Association | 3 | 1 |
| Australian Academy of Cinema and Television Arts | 0 | 1 |
| Australian Film Critics Association | 0 | 1 |
| Belgian Film Critics Association | 0 | 1 |
| Boston Society of Film Critics | 2 | 0 |
| British Academy Film Awards | 0 | 4 |
| Cannes Film Festival | 1 | 0 |
| Chicago Film Critics Association | 1 | 4 |
| Critics' Choice Movie Awards | 1 | 8 |
| Dallas–Fort Worth Film Critics Association | 0 | 2 |
| David di Donatello | 0 | 1 |
| Detroit Film Critics Society | 0 | 1 |
| Dublin Film Critics' Circle | 3 | 0 |
| Empire Awards | 0 | 5 |
| Florida Film Critics Circle | 1 | 0 |
| Golden Globe Award | 0 | 1 |
| Hollywood Film Awards | 1 | 0 |
| Houston Film Critics Society | 2 | 1 |
| Independent Spirit Awards | 0 | 4 |
| London Film Critics' Circle | 0 | 5 |
| Los Angeles Film Critics Association | 0 | 1 |
| MTV Movie Awards | 0 | 3 |
| National Board of Review | 1 | 0 |
| National Society of Film Critics | 1 | 0 |
| New York Film Critics Circle | 1 | 0 |
| New York Film Critics Online | 1 | 0 |
| Online Film Critics Society | 0 | 6 |
| San Diego Film Critics Society | 1 | 5 |
| San Francisco Film Critics Circle | 1 | 0 |
| Satellite Awards | 4 | 3 |
| St. Louis Film Critics Association | 1 | 8 |
| Village Voice Film Poll | 1 | 2 |
| Washington D.C. Area Film Critics Association | 1 | 3 |
| World Soundtrack Academy | 0 | 2 |
- Total number of wins and nominations
| Totals | 30 | 80 |
- References

Drive is a 2011 American action drama film directed by Nicolas Winding Refn and written by Hossein Amini, based on the 2005 novel Drive by James Sallis. The film stars Ryan Gosling as an unnamed Hollywood stunt driver moonlighting as a getaway driver, whose budding relationship with his neighbor Irene (Carey Mulligan) and her young son Benicio is interrupted by the sudden release of her husband Standard (Oscar Isaac) from prison. Debt-ridden, Standard hires him to take part in what turns out to be a botched, million-dollar heist that endangers their lives. Bryan Cranston, Christina Hendricks, Ron Perlman, and Albert Brooks play supporting roles. The film premiered on May 11 in competition at the 2011 Cannes Film Festival, before being released by FilmDistrict in American theaters on September 16. Drive earned a worldwide total of $76.1 million on a production budget of $15 million. The review-aggregation website Rotten Tomatoes surveyed 258 reviews and judged 92 percent to be positive.

Drive earned various awards and nominations, with particular praise for its direction, sound design, and score. Refn garnered the Best Director Award during the film's run at Cannes. Sound editors Lon Bender and Victor Ray Ennis earned a nomination for Best Sound Editing at the 84th Academy Awards, and production designer Beth Mickle for Excellence in Production Design for a Contemporary Film at the 16th Art Directors Guild Awards. It won all three nominations awarded by the Austin Film Critics Association, including Best Director (Refn) and Best Adapted Screenplay (Amini). The film earned four nominations at the 65th British Academy Film Awards, and won a single category out of its eight nominations at the 17th Critics' Choice Awards: Best Action Movie. The Chicago Film Critics Association gave its Best Original Score award to composer Cliff Martinez, who also garnered two nominations at the 12th World Soundtrack Academy: Best Soundtrack of the Year and Soundtrack Composer of the Year.

The cast also received numerous acting accolades, with Brooks garnering the most nominations from critics' organizations. He won Best Supporting Actor awarded by the National Society of Film Critics and was nominated in the same category at the 69th Golden Globe Awards. Mulligan won the Supporting Actress Award at the Hollywood Film Awards, both for her performance in the film as well as in Shame. The film earned eight nominations at the 16th Satellite Awards, winning four: Best Director (Refn), Best Actor in a Motion Picture (Gosling), Best Actor in a Supporting Role (Brooks), and Best Sound (Bender, Ennis, Dave Patterson, and Robert Fernandez). Some critics' organization selected Drive as one of their top ten films of the year, including the National Board of Review.

== Accolades ==
| Award | Date of ceremony | Category | Recipients | Result | Ref. |
|---|---|---|---|---|---|
| Academy Awards | February 26, 2012 | Best Sound Editing | Lon Bender and Victor Ray Ennis | Nominated | |
| African-American Film Critics Association | December 13, 2011 | Best Supporting Actor | Albert Brooks | Won | |
| African-American Film Critics Association | December 13, 2011 | Top Ten Movies | Drive | Won | |
| Alliance of Women Film Journalists | January 10, 2012 | Best Actor in a Supporting Role | Albert Brooks | Nominated | |
| Alliance of Women Film Journalists | January 10, 2012 | Movie You Wanted To Love But Just Couldn't | Drive | Nominated | |
| Alliance of Women Film Journalists | January 10, 2012 | Unforgettable Moment | The elevator scene | Nominated | |
| Art Directors Guild | February 4, 2012 | Excellence in Production Design for a Contemporary Film | Beth Mickle | Nominated | |
| Austin Film Critics Association | December 28, 2011 | Best Director | Nicolas Winding Refn | Won | |
| Austin Film Critics Association | December 28, 2011 | Best Adapted Screenplay | Hossein Amini | Won | |
| Austin Film Critics Association | December 28, 2011 | Best Supporting Actor | Albert Brooks | Won | |
| Austin Film Critics Association | December 28, 2011 | Top Ten Films | Drive | Second place | |
| Australian Academy of Cinema and Television Arts | January 27, 2012 | International Award for Best Direction | Nicolas Winding Refn | Nominated | |
| Australian Film Critics Association | February 15, 2012 | Best Overseas Film (English Language) | Drive | Nominated | |
| Belgian Film Critics Association | January 7, 2012 | Grand Prix | Drive | Nominated | |
| Boston Society of Film Critics | December 12, 2011 | Best Supporting Actor | Albert Brooks | Won | |
| Boston Society of Film Critics | December 12, 2011 | Best Use of Music in a Film | Drive | Won (Note: Tied with The Artist) | |
| British Academy Film Awards | February 12, 2012 | Best Film | Drive | Nominated | |
| British Academy Film Awards | February 12, 2012 | Best Director | Nicolas Winding Refn | Nominated | |
| British Academy Film Awards | February 12, 2012 | Best Supporting Actress | Carey Mulligan | Nominated | |
| British Academy Film Awards | February 12, 2012 | Best Editing | Matthew Newman | Nominated | |
| Cannes Film Festival | May 22, 2011 | Best Director | Nicolas Winding Refn | Won | |
| Chicago Film Critics Association | December 19, 2011 | Best Adapted Screenplay | Hossein Amini | Nominated | |
| Chicago Film Critics Association | December 19, 2011 | Best Cinematography | Newton Thomas Sigel | Nominated | |
| Chicago Film Critics Association | December 19, 2011 | Best Director | Nicolas Winding Refn | Nominated | |
| Chicago Film Critics Association | December 19, 2011 | Best Original Score | Cliff Martinez | Won | |
| Chicago Film Critics Association | December 19, 2011 | Best Picture | Drive | Nominated | |
| Critics' Choice Movie Awards | January 13, 2012 | Best Action Movie | Drive | Won | |
| Critics' Choice Movie Awards | January 13, 2012 | Best Actor | Ryan Gosling | Nominated | |
| Critics' Choice Movie Awards | January 13, 2012 | Best Cinematography | Newton Thomas Sigel | Nominated | |
| Critics' Choice Movie Awards | January 13, 2012 | Best Director | Nicolas Winding Refn | Nominated | |
| Critics' Choice Movie Awards | January 13, 2012 | Best Editing | Matthew Newman | Nominated | |
| Critics' Choice Movie Awards | January 13, 2012 | Best Picture | Drive | Nominated | |
| Critics' Choice Movie Awards | January 13, 2012 | Best Score | Cliff Martinez | Nominated | |
| Critics' Choice Movie Awards | January 13, 2012 | Best Supporting Actor | Albert Brooks | Nominated | |
| Dallas–Fort Worth Film Critics Association | December 16, 2011 | Best Supporting Actor | Albert Brooks | Nominated | |
| Dallas–Fort Worth Film Critics Association | December 16, 2011 | Top 10 Films of the Year | Drive | Eighth place | |
| David di Donatello | May 4, 2012 | Best Foreign Film | Drive | Nominated | |
| Detroit Film Critics Society | December 11, 2011 | Best Supporting Actor | Albert Brooks | Nominated | |
| Dublin Film Critics' Circle | December 23, 2011 | Best Actor | Ryan Gosling | Won | |
| Dublin Film Critics' Circle | December 23, 2011 | Best Director | Nicolas Winding Refn | Won | |
| Dublin Film Critics' Circle | December 23, 2011 | Best Film | Drive | Won | |
| Empire Awards | March 25, 2012 | Best Film | Drive | Nominated | |
| Empire Awards | March 25, 2012 | Best Thriller | Drive | Nominated | |
| Empire Awards | March 25, 2012 | Best Director | Nicolas Winding Refn | Nominated | |
| Empire Awards | March 25, 2012 | Best Actor | Ryan Gosling | Nominated | |
| Empire Awards | March 25, 2012 | Best Actress | Carey Mulligan | Nominated | |
| Florida Film Critics Circle | December 19, 2011 | Best Supporting Actor | Albert Brooks | Won | |
| Golden Globe Awards | January 15, 2012 | Best Supporting Actor – Motion Picture | Albert Brooks | Nominated | |
| Hollywood Film Awards | October 24, 2011 | Supporting Actress | Carey Mulligan | Won (Note: Carey Mulligan won the Supporting Actress Award for her performance in Drive and Shame.) | |
| Houston Film Critics Society | December 14, 2011 | Best Picture | Drive | Nominated | |
| Houston Film Critics Society | December 14, 2011 | Best Director | Nicolas Winding Refn | Won | |
| Houston Film Critics Society | December 14, 2011 | Best Supporting Actor | Albert Brooks | Won | |
| Independent Spirit Awards | February 25, 2012 | Best Film | Drive | Nominated | |
| Independent Spirit Awards | February 25, 2012 | Best Director | Nicolas Winding Refn | Nominated | |
| Independent Spirit Awards | February 25, 2012 | Best Male Lead | Ryan Gosling | Nominated | |
| Independent Spirit Awards | February 25, 2012 | Best Supporting Male | Albert Brooks | Nominated | |
| London Film Critics' Circle | January 19, 2012 | Actor of the Year | Ryan Gosling | Nominated | |
| London Film Critics' Circle | January 19, 2012 | British Actress of the Year | Carey Mulligan | Nominated | |
| London Film Critics' Circle | January 19, 2012 | Director of the Year | Nicolas Winding Refn | Nominated | |
| London Film Critics' Circle | January 19, 2012 | Film of the Year | Drive | Nominated | |
| London Film Critics' Circle | January 19, 2012 | Supporting Actor of the Year | Albert Brooks | Nominated | |
| Los Angeles Film Critics Association | December 11, 2011 | Best Music Score | Cliff Martinez | Runner–up | |
| MTV Movie Awards | June 3, 2012 | Best Male Performance | Ryan Gosling | Nominated | |
| MTV Movie Awards | June 3, 2012 | Best Song from a Movie | "A Real Hero" by College featuring Electric Youth | Nominated | |
| MTV Movie Awards | June 3, 2012 | Best Gut-Wrenching Performance | Ryan Gosling | Nominated | |
| National Board of Review | December 1, 2011 | Top Ten Films | Drive | Won | |
| National Society of Film Critics | January 7, 2012 | Best Supporting Actor | Albert Brooks | Won | |
| New York Film Critics Circle | November 30, 2011 | Best Supporting Actor | Albert Brooks | Won | |
| New York Film Critics Online | December 11, 2011 | Best Supporting Actor | Albert Brooks | Won | |
| Online Film Critics Society | January 2, 2012 | Best Adapted Screenplay | Drive | Nominated | |
| Online Film Critics Society | January 2, 2012 | Best Cinematography | Drive | Nominated | |
| Online Film Critics Society | January 2, 2012 | Best Director | Nicolas Winding Refn | Nominated | |
| Online Film Critics Society | January 2, 2012 | Best Editing | Drive | Nominated | |
| Online Film Critics Society | January 2, 2012 | Best Picture | Drive | Nominated | |
| Online Film Critics Society | January 2, 2012 | Best Supporting Actor | Albert Brooks | Nominated | |
| San Diego Film Critics Society | December 14, 2011 | Best Adapted Screenplay | Hossein Amini | Nominated | |
| San Diego Film Critics Society | December 14, 2011 | Best Cinematography | Newton Thomas Sigel | Nominated | |
| San Diego Film Critics Society | December 14, 2011 | Best Director | Nicolas Winding Refn | Won | |
| San Diego Film Critics Society | December 14, 2011 | Best Editing | Matthew Newman | Nominated | |
| San Diego Film Critics Society | December 14, 2011 | Best Film | Drive | Nominated | |
| San Diego Film Critics Society | December 14, 2011 | Best Supporting Actor | Albert Brooks | Nominated | |
| San Francisco Film Critics Circle | December 11, 2011 | Best Supporting Actor | Albert Brooks | Won | |
| Satellite Awards | December 18, 2011 | Best Actor in a Motion Picture | Ryan Gosling | Won | |
| Satellite Awards | December 18, 2011 | Best Actor in a Supporting Role | Albert Brooks | Won | |
| Satellite Awards | December 18, 2011 | Best Cinematography | Newton Thomas Sigel | Nominated | |
| Satellite Awards | December 18, 2011 | Best Director | Nicolas Winding Refn | Won | |
| Satellite Awards | December 18, 2011 | Best Film Editing | Matthew Newman | Nominated | |
| Satellite Awards | December 18, 2011 | Best Motion Picture | Drive | Nominated | |
| Satellite Awards | December 18, 2011 | Best Original Score | Cliff Martinez | Nominated | |
| Satellite Awards | December 18, 2011 | Best Sound | Dave Patterson, Lon Bender, Victor Ray Ennis, Robert Fernandez | Won | |
| St. Louis Film Critics Association | December 19, 2011 | Best Actor | Ryan Gosling | Nominated | |
| St. Louis Film Critics Association | December 19, 2011 | Best Cinematography | Newton Thomas Sigel | Nominated | |
| St. Louis Film Critics Association | December 19, 2011 | Best Director | Nicolas Winding Refn | Nominated | |
| St. Louis Film Critics Association | December 19, 2011 | Best Music/Score | Cliff Martinez | Nominated | |
| St. Louis Film Critics Association | December 19, 2011 | Best Film | Drive | Nominated | |
| St. Louis Film Critics Association | December 19, 2011 | Best Adapted Screenplay | Hossein Amini | Nominated | |
| St. Louis Film Critics Association | December 19, 2011 | Best Supporting Actor | Albert Brooks | Won | |
| St. Louis Film Critics Association | December 19, 2011 | Special Merit (for best scene, cinematic technique or other memorable aspect or moment) | The elevator beating sequence | Nominated | |
| St. Louis Film Critics Association | December 19, 2011 | Special Merit (for best scene, cinematic technique or other memorable aspect or moment) | The opening get-away scene | Nominated | |
| Teen Choice Awards | July 22, 2012 | Choice Movie – Drama | Drive | Nominated | |
| Teen Choice Awards | July 22, 2012 | Choice Movie Actor – Drama | Ryan Gosling | Nominated | |
| Village Voice Film Poll | December 22, 2011 | Actor | Ryan Gosling | Nominated | |
| Village Voice Film Poll | December 22, 2011 | Film | Drive | Nominated | |
| Village Voice Film Poll | December 22, 2011 | Supporting Actor | Albert Brooks | Won | |
| Washington D.C. Area Film Critics Association | December 5, 2011 | Best Director | Nicolas Winding Refn | Nominated | |
| Washington D.C. Area Film Critics Association | December 5, 2011 | Best Film | Drive | Nominated | |
| Washington D.C. Area Film Critics Association | December 5, 2011 | Best Score | Cliff Martinez | Nominated | |
| Washington D.C. Area Film Critics Association | December 5, 2011 | Best Supporting Actor | Albert Brooks | Won | |
| World Soundtrack Academy | October 20, 2012 | Best Soundtrack of the Year | Cliff Martinez | Nominated | |
| World Soundtrack Academy | October 20, 2012 | Soundtrack Composer of the Year | Cliff Martinez | Nominated | |

== See also ==
- 2011 in film
