= Watts (producer) =

Canadian record producer

Austin Garrick, also known as Watts, is a Canadian record producer, songwriter, musician and composer from Toronto, Ontario. He has produced for artists such as Ghostface Killah, Redman, Method Man, Ryuichi Sakamoto and Gesaffelstein. He is one half of synth-pop duo Electric Youth (alongside childhood girlfriend Bronwyn Griffin), who first rose to prominence upon the release of their song "A Real Hero", from the acclaimed soundtrack of the motion picture Drive.

== Early life and career ==
Watts grew up in the Oakwood-Vaughan neighbourhood of Toronto. He was born to a Vincentian musician father and a Polish-born mother (of Greek and Russian descent), a doctor. His father, who was a drummer in the reggae band Messenjah, taught him how to play drums when he was two years old, and professionally by the age of five. Nicknamed "Stixs", he would perform around Toronto regularly, opening for reggae band Third World at the age of seven and in front of a crowd of over 50,000 at the Rogers Centre alongside Nelson Mandela, at the age of 12. After his parents got divorced, he started making beats as an alternative to performing.

When Watts became serious about a career as a record producer, he made several trips to New York City. He dropped out of high school in Grade 11 after a meeting with producer K-Cut (of the legendary group Main Source). In New York, K-Cut took Watts under his wing and taught him about making great records, and the music business in the U.S. He later worked with Rashad Smith under the Tumblin' Dice Productions label.

== Selected discography ==
- Memory Emotion (entire album) - Electric Youth (Last Gang/eOne)
- "Forever" - Gesaffelstein feat. Electric Youth (Columbia)
- "A Real Hero (From the Motion Picture Drive)" - College & Electric Youth (Lakeshore)
- "andata (Electric Youth Remix)" - Ryuichi Sakamoto (Milan Records)
- Innerworld (entire album) - Electric Youth (Secretly Canadian / Last Gang)
- "Baby" - Ghostface Killah feat. Raheem DeVaughn (Def Jam) (Produced with Rashad Smith)
- "Do My Thing" - Kid Cudi feat. Snoop Dogg (Universal Motown) (Produced with Rashad Smith)
- "Exclusive" – Foxy Brown feat. Stacey (Black Roses)
- "Blow Treez" – Redman feat. Method Man & Ready Roc (Def Jam)
- "Jingle Baby" – Joe Budden (Def Jam)
- "Jingling Baby" (Remix) – Joe Budden feat. Coke (Def Jam)
- "Jingling Baby" – Coke (Def Jam)
- "Something About You" – In Essence (Sony BMG Canada)
- "All Night" – In Essence (Sony BMG Canada)
- "Getting It On" – Jacksoul (Sony BMG Canada)
