= Melancholia (2011 film) =

2011 film by Lars von Trier

- Danish theatrical release poster
- Directed by: Lars von Trier
- Written by: Lars von Trier
- Produced by: Meta Louise Foldager; Louise Vesth
- Starring: Kirsten Dunst; Charlotte Gainsbourg; Alexander Skarsgård; Brady Corbet; Cameron Spurr; Charlotte Rampling; Jesper Christensen; John Hurt; Stellan Skarsgård; Udo Kier; Kiefer Sutherland
- Cinematography: Manuel Alberto Claro
- Edited by: Molly Malene Stensgaard
- Production companies: Zentropa Entertainments; Memfis Film; Slot Machine; Liberator Productions; Film i Väst; Danmarks Radio; Arte France Cinéma; Sveriges Television; Canal+; Centre national du cinéma et de l'image animée; CinéCinéma; Edition Video; Nordisk Film; Det Danske Filminstitut; Eurimages; Swedish Film Institute; Filmstiftung Nordrhein-Westfalen
- Distributed by: Nordisk Film (Scandinavia); Les Films du Losange (France); Concorde Filmverleih (Germany)
- Release dates: 18 May 2011 (Cannes); 26 May 2011 (Denmark); 27 May 2011 (Sweden); 10 August 2011 (France); 6 October 2011 (Germany)
- Running time: 130 minutes
- Countries: Denmark; Sweden; France; Germany
- Language: English
- Budget: $9.4 million
- Box office: $21.8 million

Melancholia is a 2011 science fiction drama film written and directed by Lars von Trier and starring Kirsten Dunst, Charlotte Gainsbourg, and Kiefer Sutherland, with Alexander Skarsgård, Brady Corbet, Cameron Spurr, Charlotte Rampling, Jesper Christensen, John Hurt, Stellan Skarsgård, and Udo Kier in supporting roles. The film's story revolves around two sisters, one of whom marries just before a rogue planet is about to collide with Earth. Melancholia is the second film in Trier's unofficially titled Depression Trilogy. It was preceded in 2009 by Antichrist and followed by Nymphomaniac in 2013.

On 18 May 2011, Melancholia premiered at the 64th Cannes Film Festival, where it received critical acclaim and Dunst won the festival's Best Actress Award for her performance, which was a common area of praise among critics. Many critics and film scholars have considered the film to be a masterpiece. Along with Trier's previous film Dogville (2003), it was included in the 2016 poll of the greatest films since 2000 conducted by BBC and has since been featured in various listings of the best films of the 21st century.

== Plot ==
Melancholia's first approach and final collision with Earth, as described (and shown briefly in a similar diagram) in the film.

The opening sequence showcases extreme slow-motion shots of the main characters, a collapsing horse, falling birds, butterflies, different planets, and images of Earth colliding with a rogue planet.

=== Part One: Justine ===
Justine weds Michael in a castle owned by her brother-in-law John and her sister Claire. Justine and Michael are late for the reception due to their stretch limousine's difficulty traversing the narrow and winding rural road. Upon their arrival, Justine sees a star in the sky shining brightly. John, an astronomy enthusiast, explains it is the star Antares. When Michael and Justine arrive, they are asked by the wedding planner to guess how many beans are in a bottle for a game. Michael answers but Justine does not. The festivities are less than harmonious; Justine's divorced parents Gaby and Dexter verbally abuse each other in front of the guests. Justine, to John and Claire's annoyance, keeps wandering away. Justine's employer Jack, who announces her promotion to the art director of his advertising firm, expects her to write a slogan for a new campaign during the celebration. Justine finds herself pushed into a role that others have chosen for her and falls back into depression, from which she has been suffering for a long time. Toward the end of the party, which goes on until the early hours of the morning, she quits her job in an argument and calls off her marriage to Michael. After everyone leaves, Claire is told by the wedding planner that the number of beans in the bottle was 678 and that nobody guessed correctly. Early the following morning, while horse riding with Claire, Justine notices that Antares is no longer visible in the sky.

=== Part Two: Claire ===
Some time later, Justine arrives at John and Claire's estate, having sunk even further into depression, where she struggles to leave her bed and is unable to eat. Antares's apparent absence is revealed to be due to a rogue planet, "Melancholia", which appeared from behind the Sun and passed in front of Antares, occulting it. John says that according to the scientists' calculations, Melancholia will pass in proximity to Earth, but will not collide with it. Claire looks anxiously at Melancholia's path on the internet, learning of a theory that having bypassed Earth, it will turn back and collide with it. John tries to calm her down but secretly secures food and gasoline. In view of the approaching planet, Claire increasingly loses her composure, while Justine longs for the end of the world. Justine tells Claire that "all life on earth is evil", and deserves to die. Justine also confidently claims that there is no other life in the universe. When Claire asks how she knows this, Justine simply responds, "I know things" and reveals that she somehow knew there were 678 beans in the bottle at the party when nobody else did. Claire follows Justine into the woods at night as she "sunbathes" naked in the planet's glow.

Strange omens occur in the days that follow. The electricity in the castle goes out, the butler does not come to work, the horses in the stable are restless, St. Elmo's fire is seen at various times, and the weather changes erratically. Melancholia initially flies past Earth, seemingly vindicating John and the scientists. However, a gravitational interaction between the planets sends Melancholia across Earth's orbit for a second time, now moving on a path towards it. On discovering this, John takes his life by overdosing on pills. Claire finally knows for sure that Melancholia will collide with Earth and hides John's death from the family. She attempts to flee with her son Leo, but the cars will not start. Justine declines to spend her final moments with Claire on the terrace by candlelight and wine, finding this suggestion absurd. Instead, Justine calms Leo down by suggesting that they build a "magic cave" out of branches. Shortly before the collision, Justine, Claire, and Leo sit under the "cave" and hold hands. While Justine and Leo seem apathetic to, or at peace with, their impending doom, Claire panics and lets go, succumbing to her despair. Melancholia finally collides with Earth, engulfing them in a sea of flames as both planets shatter against each other.

== Cast ==
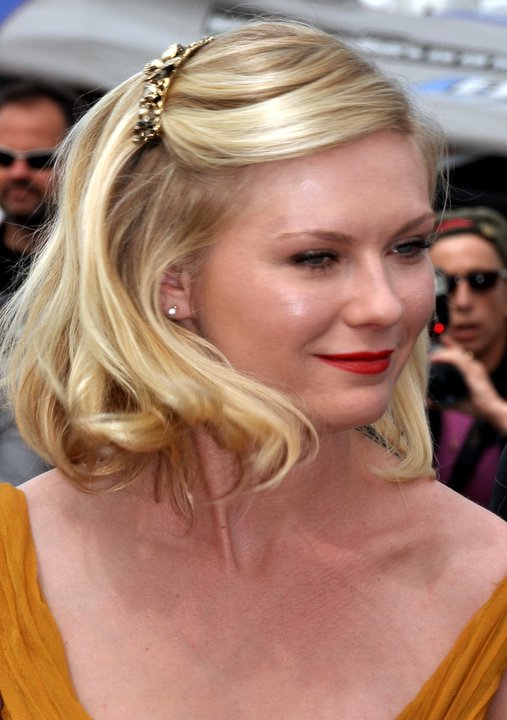
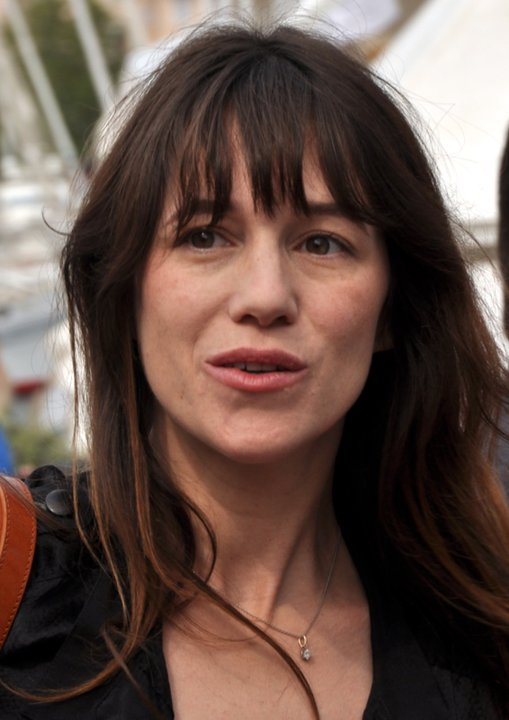
Lead actresses Kirsten Dunst and Charlotte Gainsbourg during the film's presentation at the 2011 Cannes Film Festival.
- Kirsten Dunst as Justine
- Charlotte Gainsbourg as Claire
- Alexander Skarsgård as Michael
- Kiefer Sutherland as John, Claire's husband
- Cameron Spurr as Leo, Claire and John's young son, and Justine's nephew
- Charlotte Rampling as Gaby, Justine and Claire's mother
- John Hurt as Dexter, Justine and Claire's father
- Jesper Christensen as Little Father, The Butler
- Stellan Skarsgård as Jack, Justine's boss
- Brady Corbet as Tim
- Udo Kier as The Wedding Planner

== Production ==
=== Inspiration ===
Trier's initial inspiration for the film came from a depressive episode he suffered. The film is a Danish production by Zentropa, with international co-producers in Denmark, Sweden, France, and Germany.

Filming took place in Sweden. Melancholia prominently features music from the preludes to acts one and three to Richard Wagner's opera Tristan und Isolde (1857–1859). It is the second entry in Trier's unofficially titled "Depression Trilogy", preceded by Antichrist and followed by Nymphomaniac.

=== Development ===
The idea for the film originated during a therapy session Lars von Trier attended during treatments for his depression. A therapist had told Trier that depressive people tend to act more calmly than others under heavy pressure, because they already expect bad things to happen. Trier then developed the story not primarily as a disaster film, and without any ambition to portray astrophysics realistically, but as a way to examine the human psyche during a disaster.

"In a James Bond movie we expect the hero to survive. It can get exciting nonetheless. And some things may be thrilling precisely because we know what's going to happen, but not how they will happen. In Melancholia it's interesting to see how the characters we follow react as the planet approaches Earth."

— Trier on his decision to reveal the ending in the beginning of the film

The idea of a planetary collision was inspired by websites with theories about such events. Trier decided from the outset that it would be clear from the beginning that the world would actually end in the film, so audiences would not be distracted by the suspense of not knowing. The concept of the two sisters as main characters developed via an exchange of letters between Trier and the Spanish actress Penélope Cruz. Cruz wrote that she would like to work with Trier, and spoke enthusiastically about the play The Maids by Jean Genet. As Trier subsequently tried to write a role for the actress, the two maids from the play evolved into the sisters Justine and Claire in Melancholia. Much of the personality of the character Justine was based on Trier himself. The name was inspired by the Marquis de Sade novel Justine (1791).

Melancholia was produced by Denmark's Zentropa, with co-production support from its subsidiary in Germany, Sweden's Memfis Film, France's Slot Machine, and Liberator Productions. The production received 7.9 million Danish kroner from the Danish Film Institute, 600,000 euro from Eurimages, and 3 million Swedish kronor from the Swedish Film Institute. Additional funding was provided by Film i Väst, DR, Arte France, CNC, Canal+, BIM Italy, Filmstiftung Nordrhein-Westfalen, Sveriges Television, and Nordisk Film & TV-Fond. The total budget was 52.5 million Danish kroner.

Cruz was initially expected to play the lead role, but dropped out when the filming schedule of another project was changed. Trier then offered the role to Kirsten Dunst, who accepted it. Dunst had been suggested for the role by the American filmmaker Paul Thomas Anderson in a discussion about the film between him and Trier.

=== Filming ===
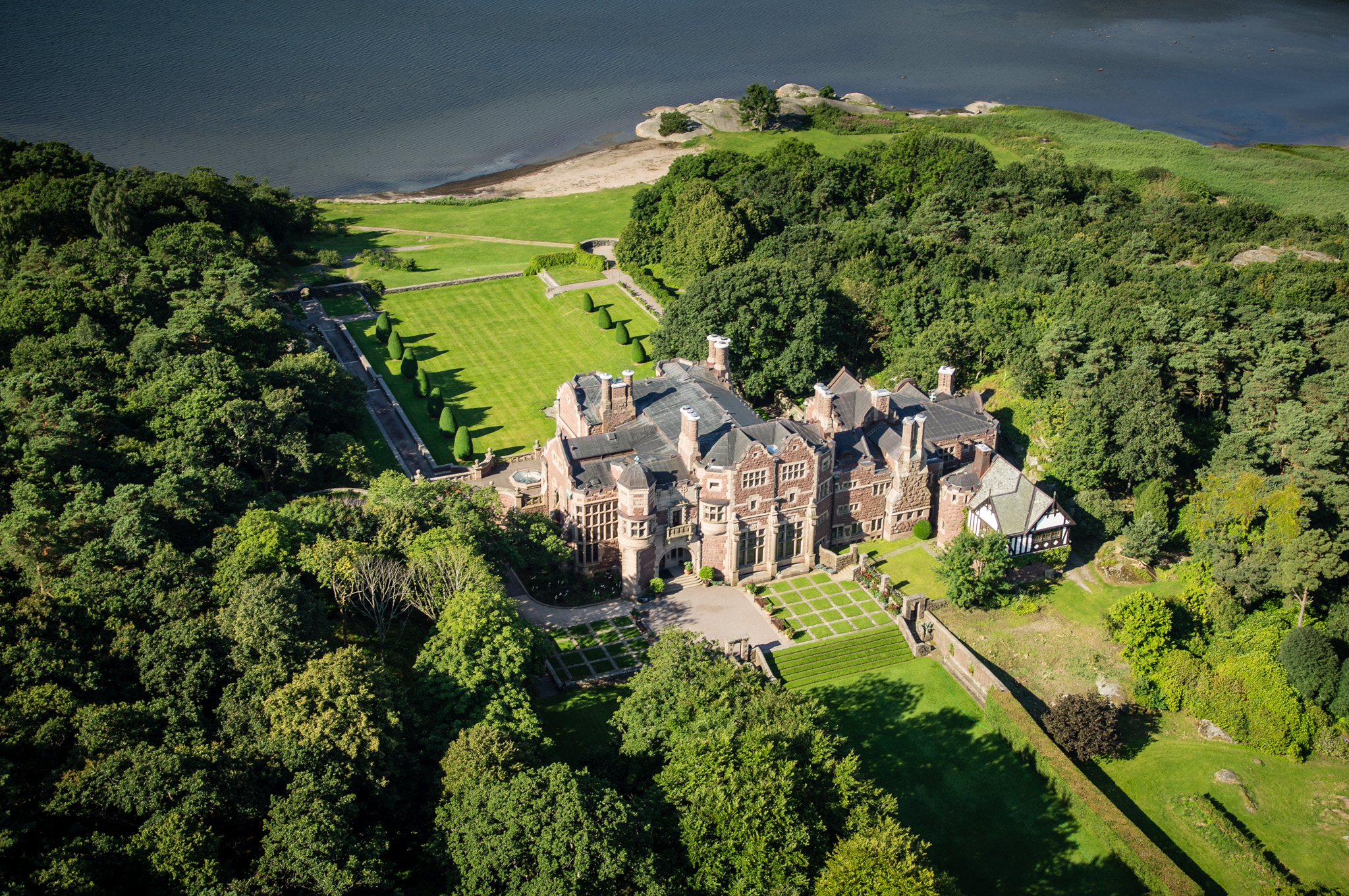
Tjolöholm Castle in Halland, Sweden, where exterior scenes were filmed, viewed from above

Principal photography began 22 July and ended 8 September 2010. Interior scenes were shot at Film i Väst's studios in Trollhättan, Sweden. It was the fourth time Trier made a film in Trollhättan. Exteriors included the area surrounding the Tjolöholm Castle, in Halland, Sweden. The film was recorded digitally with Arri Alexa and Phantom cameras. Trier employed his usual directing style with no rehearsals; instead the actors improvised and received instructions between the takes. The camera was initially operated by Trier, and then left to cinematographer Manuel Alberto Claro who repeated Trier's movements. Claro said about the method: "[Trier] wants to experience the situations the first time. He finds an energy in the scenes, presence, and makes up with the photographic aesthetics." Trier explained that the visual style he aimed at in Melancholia was "a clash between what is romantic and grand and stylized and then some form of reality", which he hoped to achieve through the hand-held camerawork. He feared, however, that it would tilt too much toward the romantic, because of the setting at the upscale wedding, and the castle, which he called "super kitschy".

=== Post-production ===
The prelude to act one of Richard Wagner's Tristan und Isolde supplies the main musical theme of the film, and Trier's use of an overture-like opening sequence before the first act is a technique closely associated with Wagner. This choice was inspired by a 30-page section of Marcel Proust's In Search of Lost Time, where Proust concludes that Wagner's prelude is the greatest work of art of all time. (Trier may have conflated this six-page passage with the much lengthier one in the same volume given over to the narrator’s thoughts during a performance of the imaginary Septet by Vinteuil, which does refer to some of Wagner’s later works (specifically Tristan, Rheingold, and Meistersinger) as “masterpieces . . . whose very perfection might perhaps have prevented them from being understood.”). Melancholia uses music more than any film by Trier since The Element of Crime from 1984. In some scenes, the film was edited in the same pace as the music. Trier said: "It's kind of like a music video that way. It's supposed to be vulgar." Trier also pointed out parallels between both the film's usage of Wagner and the film's editing to the music and the aesthetics of Nazi Germany.

Visual effects were provided by companies in Poland, Germany, and Sweden under visual effects supervisor Peter Hjorth. Poland's Platige Image, which previously had worked with Trier on Antichrist, created most of the effects seen in the film's opening sequence; the earliest instructions were provided by Trier in the summer 2010, after which a team of 19 visual effects artists worked on the project for three months.

== Release ==
In his director's statement, Trier wrote that he had started to regret having made such a polished film, but that he hoped it would contain some flaws which would make it interesting:

"I desired to dive headlong into the abyss of German romanticism ... But is that not just another way of expressing defeat? Defeat to the lowest of cinematic common denominators? Romance is abused in all sorts of endlessly dull ways in mainstream products."

The premiere took place at the 2011 Cannes Film Festival, where Melancholia was screened in competition on 18 May. The press conference after the screening gained considerable publicity. The Hollywood Reporter's Scott Roxborough wrote that "Trier has never been very P.C. and his Cannes press conferences always play like a dark stand-up routine, but at the Melancholia press conference he took it to another level, tossing a grenade into any sense of public decorum." Trier first joked about working on a hardcore pornographic film that would star Dunst and Gainsbourg. When asked about the relation between the influences of German Romanticism in Melancholia and Trier's own German heritage, the director brought up that he had been raised believing his biological father was a Jew, only to learn as an adult that his actual father was a German. He then made jokes about Jews and Nazis, said he understood Adolf Hitler and admired the work of architect Albert Speer, and jokingly announced that he was a Nazi. The Cannes Film Festival issued an official apology for the remarks the same day and clarified that Trier is not a Nazi or an anti-Semite, then declared the director "persona non grata" the following day. This meant he was not allowed to go within 100 meters of the Festival Palace, but he did remain in Cannes and continued to give promotional interviews.

On 26 May 2011, the film was released in Denmark through Nordisk Film. Launched on 57 screens, the film entered the box-office chart as number three. A total of 50,000 tickets were eventually sold in Denmark. It was released in the United Kingdom and Ireland on 30 September, in Germany on 6 October and in Italy on 21 October. Magnolia Pictures acquired the distribution rights for North America and it was released on 11 November, with a pre-theatrical release on 13 October as a rental through such Direct TV vendors as Vudu and Amazon. Madman Entertainment bought the rights for Australia and New Zealand.

== Reception ==
=== Critical response ===
On review aggregator Rotten Tomatoes, 80% of 209 critic reviews are positive, and the average rating is 7.5/10. The website's critical consensus states, "Melancholia's dramatic tricks are more obvious than they should be, but this is otherwise a showcase for Kirsten Dunst's acting and for Lars von Trier's profound, visceral vision of depression and destruction." According to Metacritic, the film received "universal acclaim", based on an average score of 81 out of 100 from 40 critics. A 2017 data analysis of Metacritic reviews by Gizmodo UK found the film to be the most critically divisive film of recent years.

Kim Skotte of Politiken compared the film with the director's previous work:

"There are images—many images—in Melancholia which underline that Lars von Trier is a unique film storyteller... The choice of material and treatment of it underlines Lars von Trier's originality... Through its material and look, Melancholia creates rifts, but unlike Antichrist I don't feel that there is a fence pole in the rift which is smashed directly down into the meat. You sit on your seat in the cinema and mildly marveled go along in the end of the world."

Berlingske's Ebbe Iversen wrote about the film:

"It is big, it is enigmatic, and now and then rather irritating. But it is also a visionary work, which makes a gigantic impression. From time to time the film moves on the edge of kitsch, but with Justine played by Kirsten Dunst and Claire played by Charlotte Gainsbourg as the leading characters, Melancholia is a bold, uneven, unruly and completely unforgettable film."

Steven Loeb of Southampton Patch wrote:

"This film has brought the best out of von Trier, as well as his star. Dunst is so good in this film, playing a character unlike any other she has ever attempted, that she won the award for Best Actress at the Cannes Film Festival this past May. Even if the film itself were not the incredible work of art that it is, Dunst's performance alone would be incentive enough to recommend it."

Sukhdev Sandhu wrote from Cannes in The Daily Telegraph that the film "at times comes close to being a tragi-comic opera about the end of the world," and that, "the apocalypse, when it comes, is so beautifully rendered that the film cements the quality of fairy tale that its palatial setting suggests." About the actors' performances, Sandhu wrote: "all of them are excellent here, but Dunst is exceptional, so utterly convincing in the lead role—troubled, serene, a fierce savant—that it feels like a career breakthrough. Meanwhile, Gainsbourg, for whom the end of the world must seem positively pastoral after the horrors she went through in Antichrist, locates in Claire a fragility that ensures she's more than a whipping girl for social satire." Sandhu brought up one reservation in the review, in which he gave the film the highest possible rating of five stars: "there is, as always with Von Trier's work, a degree of intellectual determinism that can be off-putting; he illustrates rather than truly explore ideas." Peter Bradshaw, writing for The Guardian, stated "Windup merchant Lars von Trier is back with a film about the end of the world – but it's not to be taken entirely seriously", and gave it three stars out of a possible five.

In 2020, amid the COVID-19 pandemic, an Atlantic culture writer found "the perspective of a catastrophe-minded person thrust into a state of actual catastrophe finds perhaps no better creative expression" than in the film. BBC Culture stated that "arguably no film has been more profoundly compassionate in its depiction of a mental crisis" and the title questions if it is "the greatest film about depression ever made."

=== Accolades ===
Film Comment magazine listed Melancholia third on its Best Films of 2011 list. The film also received 12 votes—seven from critics and five from directors—in the British Film Institute's 2012 Sight & Sound poll of the greatest movies ever made, making it one of the few films of the 21st century to appear within the top 250. In 2016, the film was named as the 43rd best film of the 21st century, from a poll of 177 film critics from around the world. In 2019, Time listed it as one of the best films of the 2010s decade, while Cahiers du cinéma named it the eighth best film of the 2010s. That same year, Vulture named Melancholia the best film of the 2010s. In 2025, it ranked number 84 on The New York Times' list of "The 100 Best Movies of the 21st Century" and was one of the films voted for the "Readers' Choice" edition of the list, finishing at number 118.

Award	Date of the ceremony	Category	Recipients	Result	Ref.
Cannes Film Festival	11–22 May 2011	Palme d'Or	Lars von Trier	Nominated	
Cannes Film Festival	11–22 May 2011	Best Actress	Kirsten Dunst	Won	
Hamptons International Film Festival	13–17 October 2011	Breakthrough Performer	Alexander Skarsgård	Won	
Denver Film Critics Society	2–13 November 2011	Best Film	Melancholia	Nominated	
Denver Film Critics Society	2–13 November 2011	Best Director	Lars von Trier	Nominated	
Denver Film Critics Society	2–13 November 2011	Best Actress	Kirsten Dunst	Nominated	
European Film Awards	3 December 2011	Best Film	Melancholia	Won	
European Film Awards	3 December 2011	Best Director	Lars von Trier	Nominated	
European Film Awards	3 December 2011	Best Actress	Kirsten Dunst	Nominated	
European Film Awards	3 December 2011	Best Actress	Charlotte Gainsbourg	Nominated	
European Film Awards	3 December 2011	Best Screenwriter	Lars von Trier	Nominated	
European Film Awards	3 December 2011	Best Cinematographer	Manuel Alberto Claro	Won	
European Film Awards	3 December 2011	Best Editor	Molly Malene Stensgaard	Nominated	
European Film Awards	3 December 2011	Best Production Designer	Jette Lehmann	Won	
Washington D.C. Area Film Critics Association	5 December 2011	Best Cinematography	Manuel Alberto Claro	Nominated	
Los Angeles Film Critics Association	11 December 2011	Best Actress	Kirsten Dunst	Runner-up	
New York Film Critics Online	11 December 2011	Top Pictures of 2011	Melancholia	Won	
St. Louis Film Critics Association	12 December 2011	Special Merit (Best Scene)	Melancholia (for "The Last Scene")	Nominated	
Dallas–Fort Worth Film Critics Association	16 December 2011	Best Actress	Kirsten Dunst	Nominated	
Chicago Film Critics Association	19 December 2011	Best Actress	Kirsten Dunst	Nominated	
Chicago Film Critics Association	19 December 2011	Best Cinematography	Manuel Alberto Claro	Nominated	
IndieWire Critics Poll	19 December 2011	Best Film	Melancholia	2nd place	
IndieWire Critics Poll	19 December 2011	Best Director	Lars von Trier (tied with Martin Scorsese for Hugo)	2nd place	
IndieWire Critics Poll	19 December 2011	Best Lead Performance	Kirsten Dunst	5th place	
IndieWire Critics Poll	19 December 2011	Best Cinematography	Manuel Alberto Claro (tied with Newton Thomas Sigel for Drive)	3rd place	
IndieWire Critics Poll	19 December 2011	Best Ensemble	Jesper Christensen, Brady Corbet, Kirsten Dunst, Charlotte Gainsbourg, John Hurt, Udo Kier, Charlotte Rampling, Alexander Skarsgård, Stellan Skarsgård, and Kiefer Sutherland	Nominated	
Dublin Film Critics' Circle	23 December 2011	Top 10 Films	Melancholia	5th place	
Dublin Film Critics' Circle	23 December 2011	Top 10 Directors	Lars von Trier	5th place	
Dublin Film Critics' Circle	23 December 2011	Top 10 Actresses	Kirsten Dunst	5th place	
Oklahoma Film Critics Circle	23 December 2011	Best Film	Melancholia	8th place	
Austin Film Critics Association	28 December 2011	Best Film	Melancholia	10th place	
Online Film Critics Society	2 January 2012	Best Director	Lars von Trier	Nominated	
Online Film Critics Society	2 January 2012	Best Actress	Kirsten Dunst	Nominated	
Online Film Critics Society	2 January 2012	Best Cinematography	Manuel Alberto Claro	Nominated	
Central Ohio Film Critics Association	5 January 2012	Best Film	Melancholia	4th place	
Central Ohio Film Critics Association	5 January 2012	Best Director	Lars von Trier	Runner-up	
Central Ohio Film Critics Association	5 January 2012	Best Cinematography	Manuel Alberto Claro	Runner-up	
National Society of Film Critics	7 January 2012	Best Film	Melancholia	Won	
National Society of Film Critics	7 January 2012	Best Director	Lars von Trier	3rd place	
National Society of Film Critics	7 January 2012	Best Actress	Kirsten Dunst	Won	
National Society of Film Critics	7 January 2012	Best Cinematography	Manuel Alberto Claro	2nd place	
Kansas City Film Critics Circle	8 January 2012	Best Actress	Kirsten Dunst	Won	
New York Film Critics Circle	9 January 2012	Best Film	Melancholia	Runner-up	
New York Film Critics Circle	9 January 2012	Best Director	Lars von Trier	Runner-up	
New York Film Critics Circle	9 January 2012	Best Actress	Kirsten Dunst	Runner-up	
Alliance of Women Film Journalists	10 January 2012	Best Film	Melancholia	Nominated	
Alliance of Women Film Journalists	10 January 2012	Best Actress	Kirsten Dunst	Nominated	
Alliance of Women Film Journalists	10 January 2012	Best Cinematography	Manuel Alberto Claro	Nominated	
Alliance of Women Film Journalists	10 January 2012	Best Depiction Of Nudity, Sexuality, or Seduction	Justine in the moonlight (tied with Michael Fassbender for Shame)	Won	
London Film Critics' Circle	19 January 2012	Actress of the Year	Kirsten Dunst	Nominated	
London Film Critics' Circle	19 January 2012	Technical Achievement in Cinematography	Manuel Alberto Claro	Nominated	
AACTA Awards	27 January 2012	Best Film – International	Melancholia	Nominated	
AACTA Awards	27 January 2012	Best Direction – International	Lars von Trier	Nominated	
AACTA Awards	27 January 2012	Best Actress – International	Kirsten Dunst	Nominated	
AACTA Awards	27 January 2012	Best Screenplay – International	Lars von Trier	Nominated	
Robert Awards	5 February 2012	Best Danish Film	Melancholia	Won	
Robert Awards	5 February 2012	Best Director	Lars von Trier	Won	
Robert Awards	5 February 2012	Best Actress in a Leading Role	Kirsten Dunst	Won	
Robert Awards	5 February 2012	Best Actress in a Supporting Role	Charlotte Gainsbourg	Won	
Robert Awards	5 February 2012	Best Screenplay	Lars von Trier	Won	
Robert Awards	5 February 2012	Best Cinematography	Manuel Alberto Claro	Won	
Robert Awards	5 February 2012	Best Production Design	Jette Lehmann	Won	
Robert Awards	5 February 2012	Best Editing	Molly Malene Stensgaard	Won	
Robert Awards	5 February 2012	Best Sound Design	Kristian Eidnes Andersen	Won	
Robert Awards	5 February 2012	Best Visual Effects	Hummer Højmark & Peter Hjort	Won	
Goya Awards	19 February 2012	Best European Film	Melancholia	Nominated	
Costume Designers Guild	21 February 2012	Excellence in Contemporary Film	Manon Rasmussen	Nominated	
César Awards	24 February 2012	Best Foreign Film	Melancholia	Nominated	
Independent Spirit Awards	25 February 2012	Best International Film	Melancholia	Nominated	
Australian Film Critics Association	29 February 2012	Best International Film	Melancholia	Nominated	
Bodil Awards	3 March 2012	Best Danish Film	Melancholia	Won	
Bodil Awards	3 March 2012	Best Actress in a Leading Role	Kirsten Dunst	Nominated	
Bodil Awards	3 March 2012	Best Actor in a Supporting Role	John Hurt	Nominated	
Bodil Awards	3 March 2012	Best Actor in a Supporting Role	Kiefer Sutherland	Nominated	
Bodil Awards	3 March 2012	Best Actress in a Supporting Role	Charlotte Gainsbourg	Nominated	
Bodil Awards	3 March 2012	Best Actress in a Supporting Role	Charlotte Rampling	Nominated	
Bodil Awards	3 March 2012	Best Cinematographer	Manuel Alberto Claro	Won	
Polish Film Awards	19 March 2012	Best European Film	Melancholia	Nominated	
David di Donatello	4 May 2012	Best European Film	Melancholia	Nominated	
Saturn Awards	26 July 2012	Best Actress	Kirsten Dunst	Won	
Saturn Awards	26 July 2012	Best Supporting Actress	Charlotte Gainsbourg	Nominated	
Saturn Awards	26 July 2012	Best International Film	Melancholia	Nominated	
Russian Guild of Film Critics	21 December 2012	Best Foreign Language Film	Melancholia	Nominated	

== Adaptations ==
In 2018, playwright Declan Greene adapted the film into a play for Malthouse Theatre in Melbourne, Australia. The cast featured Eryn Jean Norvill as Justine, Leeanna Walsman as Claire, Gareth Yuen as Michael, Steve Mouzakis as John, and Maude Davey as Gaby, while child actors Liam Smith and Alexander Artemov shared the role of Leo.

The opera Melancholia composed by Mikael Karlsson is based on the film. It premiered at the Royal Swedish Opera in Stockholm on 7 October 2023.

== See also ==
- Cinema of Denmark
- Comet in Moominland
- Impact events in fiction
- List of apocalyptic films
- Nibiru cataclysm
- Rogue planets in fiction

== Bibliography ==
- Heikkilä, Martta (2017). "The Ends of the World in Lars von Trier's Melancholia". In Schuback, Marcia Sá Cavalcante; Lindberg, Susanna (eds.). The End of the World: Contemporary Philosophy and Art. London: Rowman & Littlefield. pp. 187–199. ISBN 978-1-78660-261-9.
- Wilker, Ulrich (2014). "Liebestod ohne Erlösung. Richard Wagners Tristan-Vorspiel in Lars von Triers Film Melancholia". In Börnchen, Stefan; Mein, Georg; Strowick, Elisabeth (eds.). Jenseits von Bayreuth. Richard Wagner Heute: Neue Kulturwissenschaftliche Lektüren. Paderborn: Wilhelm Fink. pp. 263–273. ISBN 978-3-7705-5686-1.
- Zanchi, Luca (2020). "The Moving Image and the Time of Prophecy: Trauma and Precognition in L. Von Trier’s Melancholia (2011) and D. Villeneuve’s Arrival (2016)." Journal of Religion & Film: Vol. 24: Iss. 1, Article 56.
- Tiefenbach, Georg (2024). Romantik und Symbolismus. Bilder und Musik in der Ouvertüre von Lars von Triers Melancholia (Romanticism and symbolism. Images and music in the overture of Lars von Trier's Melancholia). Würzburg: Königshausen & Neumann. ISBN 978-3-8260-9037-0.
- Tiefenbach, Georg (2025). The Lars von Trier Conversations. Volume Two. About the Art of Filmmaking: Editing, Cinematography, Special Effect, New Media, Writing, and Directing. Conversations with Molly Malene Stensgaard, Manuel Alberto Claro, Peter Hjorth, and Lars von Trier. Königshausen & Neumann. ISBN 978-3-8260-9039-4
- Lowe, Nick (2017). "Melancholia". In Clute, John; Langford, David; Sleight, Graham (eds.). The Encyclopedia of Science Fiction (4th ed.).
