= Victor Ray Ennis =

Film sound editor

Ennis, Victor Ray
- Occupation: Sound editor
- Years active: 1990–present

Victor Ray Ennis is a sound editor.

On January 24, 2012, he was nominated for an Academy Award for the movie Drive. He shared his nomination with Lon Bender.
