= Austin Film Critics Association Awards 2011 =

Annual US film awards ceremony

7th AFCA Awards

Best Film:
Hugo

The 7th Austin Film Critics Association Awards, honoring the best in filmmaking for 2011, were announced on December 28, 2011.

== Top 10 Films ==
1. Hugo
2. Drive
3. Take Shelter
4. Midnight in Paris
5. Attack the Block
6. The Artist
7. Martha Marcy May Marlene
8. I Saw the Devil (Akmareul boatda)
9. 13 Assassins
10. Melancholia

== Winners ==
- Best Film:
  - Hugo
- Best Director:
  - Nicolas Winding Refn – Drive
- Best Actor:
  - Michael Shannon – Take Shelter
- Best Actress:
  - Tilda Swinton – We Need to Talk About Kevin
- Best Supporting Actor:
  - Albert Brooks – Drive
- Best Supporting Actress:
  - Jessica Chastain – Take Shelter
- Best Original Screenplay:
  - Midnight in Paris – Woody Allen
- Best Adapted Screenplay:
  - Drive – Hossein Amini
- Best Cinematography:
  - The Tree of Life – Emmanuel Lubezki
- Best Original Score:
  - Attack the Block – Steven Price
- Best Foreign Language Film:
  - I Saw the Devil (Akmareul boatda) • South Korea
- Best Documentary:
  - Senna
- Best Animated Feature:
  - Rango
- Best First Film:
  - Joe Cornish – Attack the Block
- Bobby McCurdy Breakthrough Artist Award:
  - Jessica Chastain – Coriolanus, The Debt, The Help, Take Shelter, Texas Killing Fields, and The Tree of Life
- Austin Film Award:
  - Take Shelter – Jeff Nichols
