= 2011 Los Angeles Film Critics Association Awards =

Annual US film awards ceremony

37th LAFCA Awards
- Date: December 11, 2011

Highlights
- Best Picture: The Descendants

The 37th Los Angeles Film Critics Association Awards, given by the Los Angeles Film Critics Association (LAFCA), honored the best in film for 2011.

== Winners ==
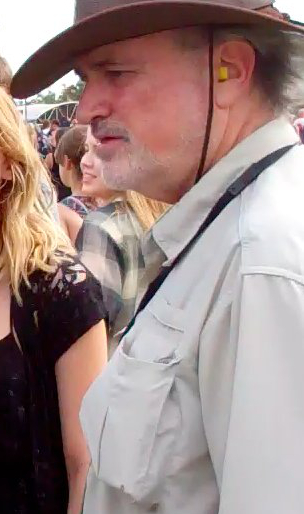
Terrence Malick, Best Director winner

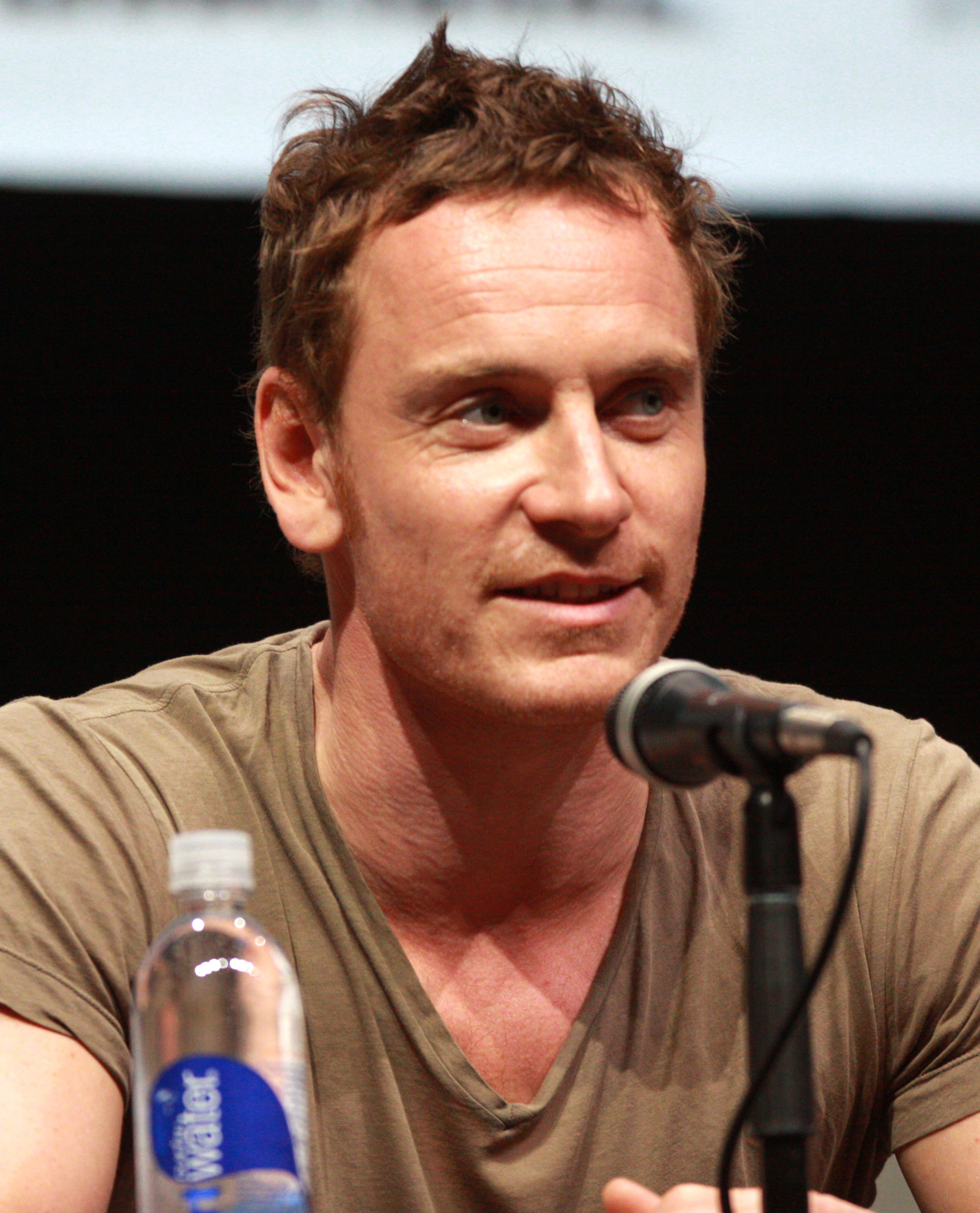
Michael Fassbender, Best Actor winner

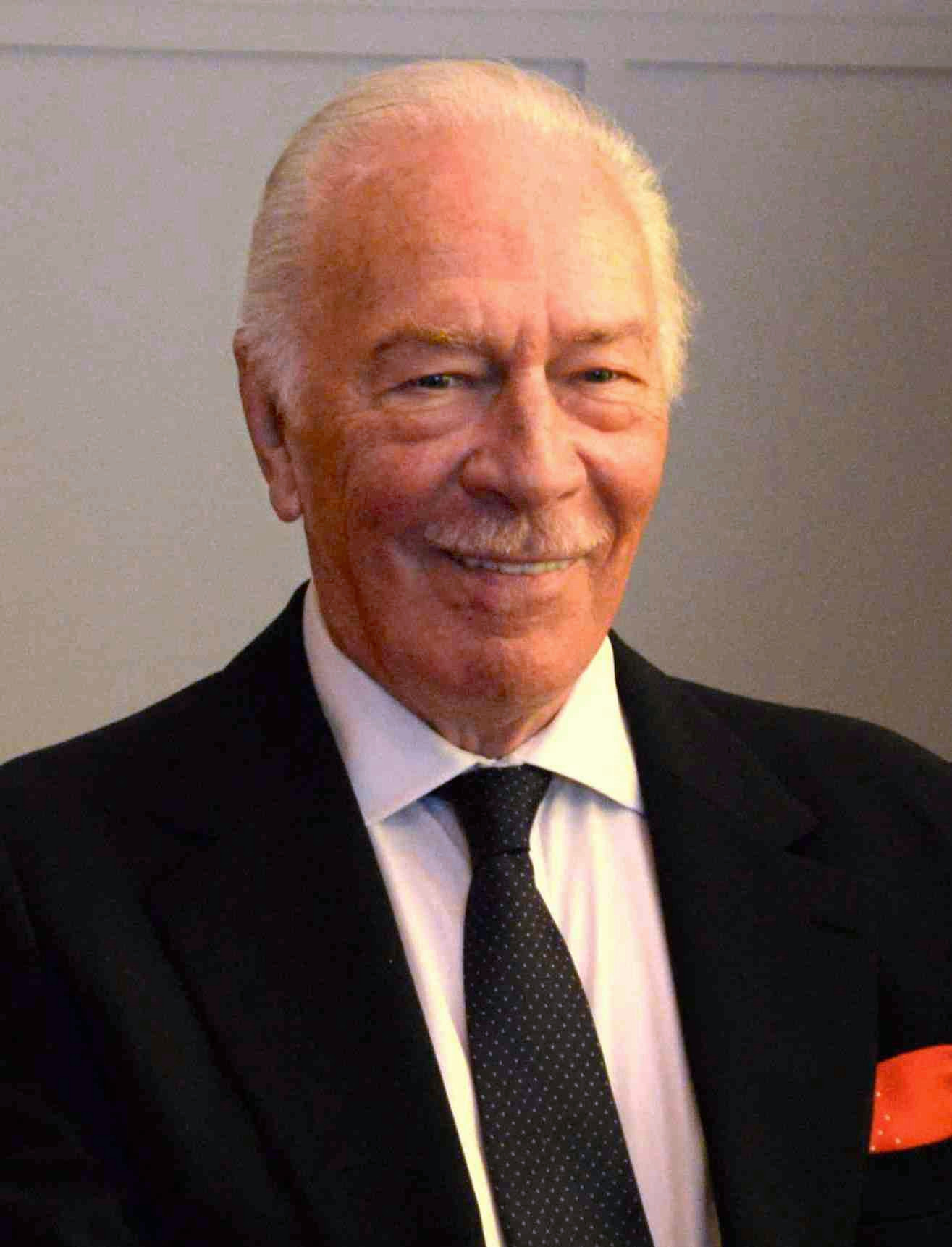
Christopher Plummer, Best Supporting Actor winner

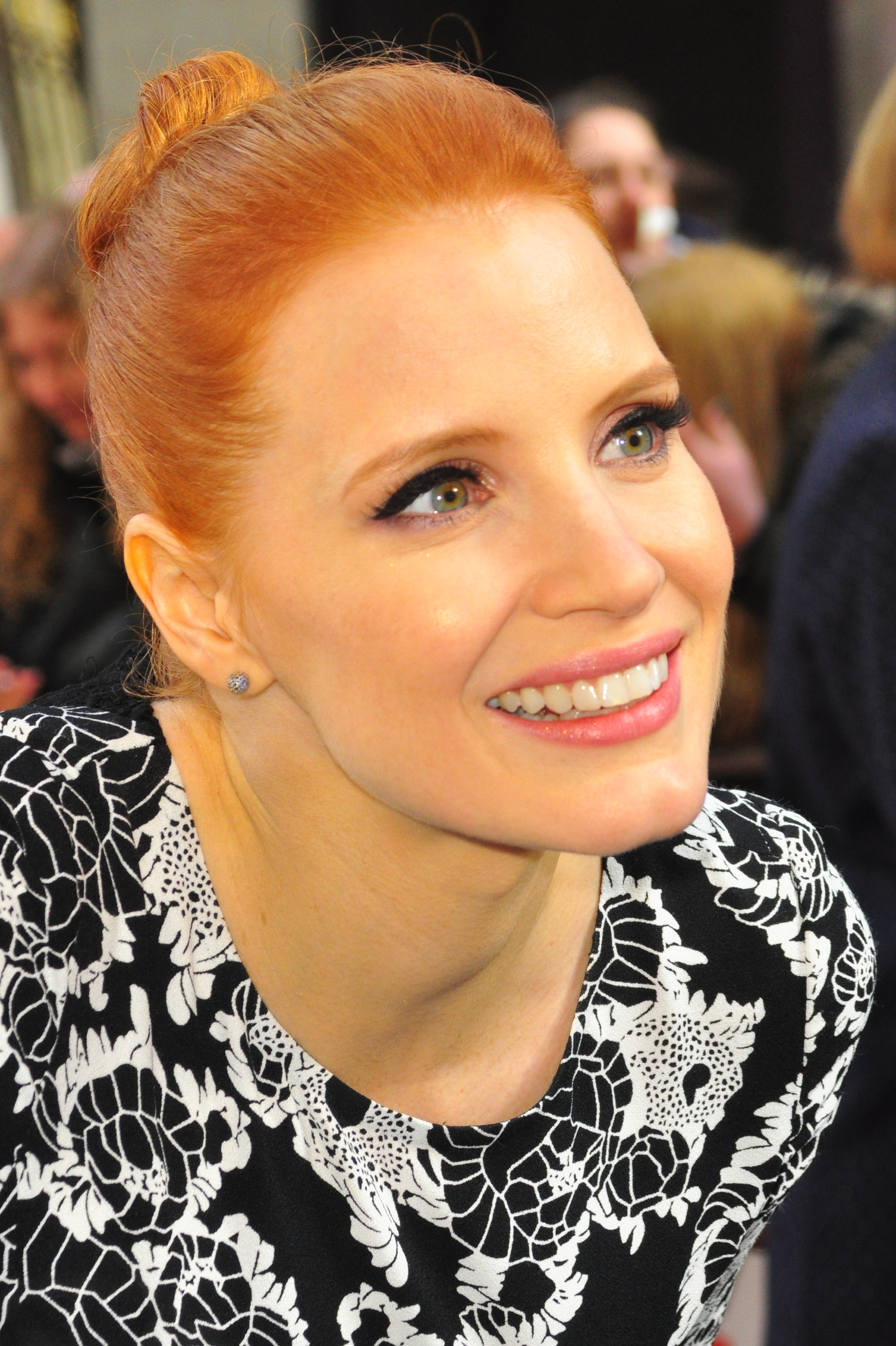
Jessica Chastain, Best Supporting Actress winner

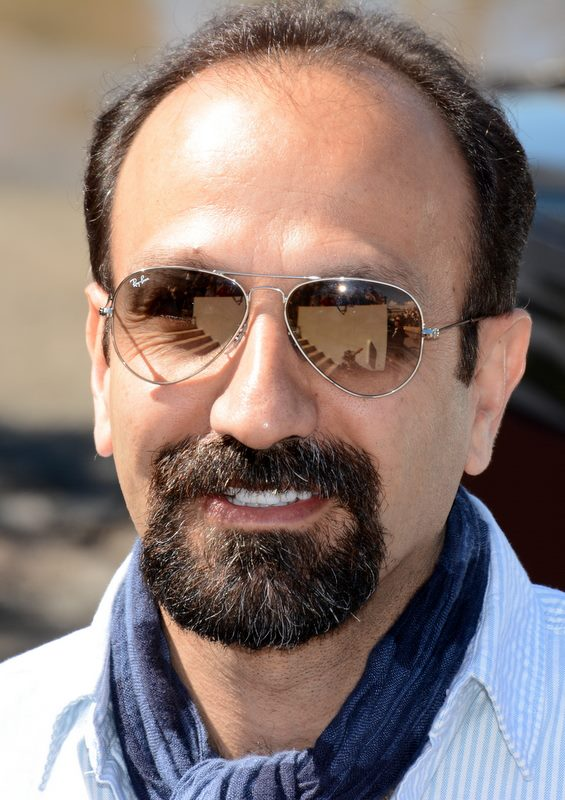
Asghar Farhadi, Best Screenplay winner

- Best Picture:
  - The Descendants
  - Runner-up: The Tree of Life
- Best Director:
  - Terrence Malick – The Tree of Life
  - Runner-up: Martin Scorsese – Hugo
- Best Actor:
  - Michael Fassbender – A Dangerous Method, Jane Eyre, Shame, and X-Men: First Class
  - Runner-up: Michael Shannon – Take Shelter
- Best Actress:
  - Yoon Jeong-hee – Poetry (Shi)
  - Runner-up: Kirsten Dunst – Melancholia
- Best Supporting Actor:
  - Christopher Plummer – Beginners
  - Runner-up: Patton Oswalt – Young Adult
- Best Supporting Actress:
  - Jessica Chastain – Coriolanus, The Debt, The Help, Take Shelter, Texas Killing Fields, and The Tree of Life
  - Runner-up: Janet McTeer – Albert Nobbs
- Best Screenplay:
  - Asghar Farhadi – A Separation (Jodaeiye Nader az Simin)
  - Runner-up: Nat Faxon, Jim Rash, and Alexander Payne – The Descendants
- Best Cinematography:
  - Emmanuel Lubezki – The Tree of Life
  - Runner-up: Cao Yu – City of Life and Death (Nanjing! Nanjing!)
- Best Production Design:
  - Dante Ferretti – Hugo
  - Runner-up: Maria Djurkovic – Tinker Tailor Soldier Spy
- Best Music Score:
  - The Chemical Brothers – Hanna
  - Runner-up: Cliff Martinez – Drive
- Best Foreign Language Film:
  - City of Life and Death (Nanjing! Nanjing!) • China
  - Runner-up: A Separation (Jodaeiye Nader az Simin) • Iran
- Best Documentary/Non-Fiction Film:
  - Cave of Forgotten Dreams
  - Runner-up: The Arbor
- Best Animation:
  - Rango
  - Runner-up: The Adventures of Tintin
- New Generation Award:
  - Antonio Campos, Sean Durkin, Josh Mond, and Elizabeth Olsen – Martha Marcy May Marlene
- Career Achievement Award:
  - Doris Day
- The Douglas Edwards Experimental/Independent Film/Video Award:
  - Bill Morrison – Spark of Being
