= Innerworld =

2014 studio album by Electric Youth

Studio album by Electric Youth
- Released: September 30, 2014
- Genre: Synth-pop
- Label: Secretly Canadian/Last Gang Records
- Producer: Electric Youth; Vince Clarke; Peter Mayes

Electric Youth chronology
Innerworld (2014)	Memory Emotion (2019)

Innerworld is the first full-length studio album by Canadian synth-pop band Electric Youth. The album was released in Canada by Last Gang Records and in the rest of the world by Secretly Canadian on September 30, 2014.

NPR premiered the album via their "First Listen" program on September 20, 2014.

The album was recorded in Toronto and Los Angeles and was produced by Electric Youth. Vince Clarke and Peter Mayes provided additional production and Mayes also mixed the album.

The album artwork features Electric Youth's Austin Garrick and Bronwyn Griffin, as painted by English painter Paul Roberts.

Electric Youth released a digital and 2LP vinyl 10th Anniversary Edition featuring three bonus remix tracks.

Professional ratings
Aggregate scores
Source	Rating
Metacritic	(71/100) link
Review scores
Source	Rating
Allmusic	3/5 stars
NME	8/10 stars
Exclaim!	(9/10)
PopMatters	(
Under The Radar	(

== Track listing ==
No.	Title	Length
1.	"Before Life"	2:11
2.	"Runaway"	3:40
3.	"WeAreTheYouth"	3:12
4.	"Innocence"	3:54
5.	"Without You" (with ROOM8)	3:28
6.	"If All She Has Is You"	3:33
7.	"The Best Thing"	3:55
8.	"Tomorrow"	5:42
9.	"Another Story"	3:42
10.	"She's Sleeping Interlude"	2:05
11.	"A Real Hero" (with College)	4:27
12.	"Outro"	3:19

Deluxe edition bonus tracks
No.	Title	Length
13.	"Get Along"	4:04
14.	"Modern Fears"	4:37
15.	"Final Girl"	3:41

2024 10th Anniversary edition bonus tracks
No.	Title	Length
16.	"Runaway (Fred Falke Remix)"	4:25
17.	"The Best Thing (Lifelike Remix)"	6:04
18.	"Innocence (Dear AB Remix)"	4:38
