= Chicago Film Critics Association Awards 2011 =

Annual US film awards ceremony

24th CFCA Awards

December 19, 2011

Best Film:
The Tree of Life

The 24th Chicago Film Critics Association Awards, honoring the best in film for 2011, were announced on December 19, 2011.

== Winners and nominees ==
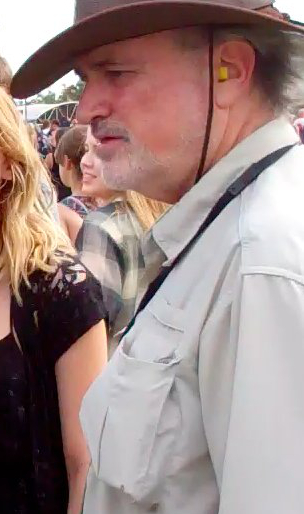
Terrence Malick, Best Director winner

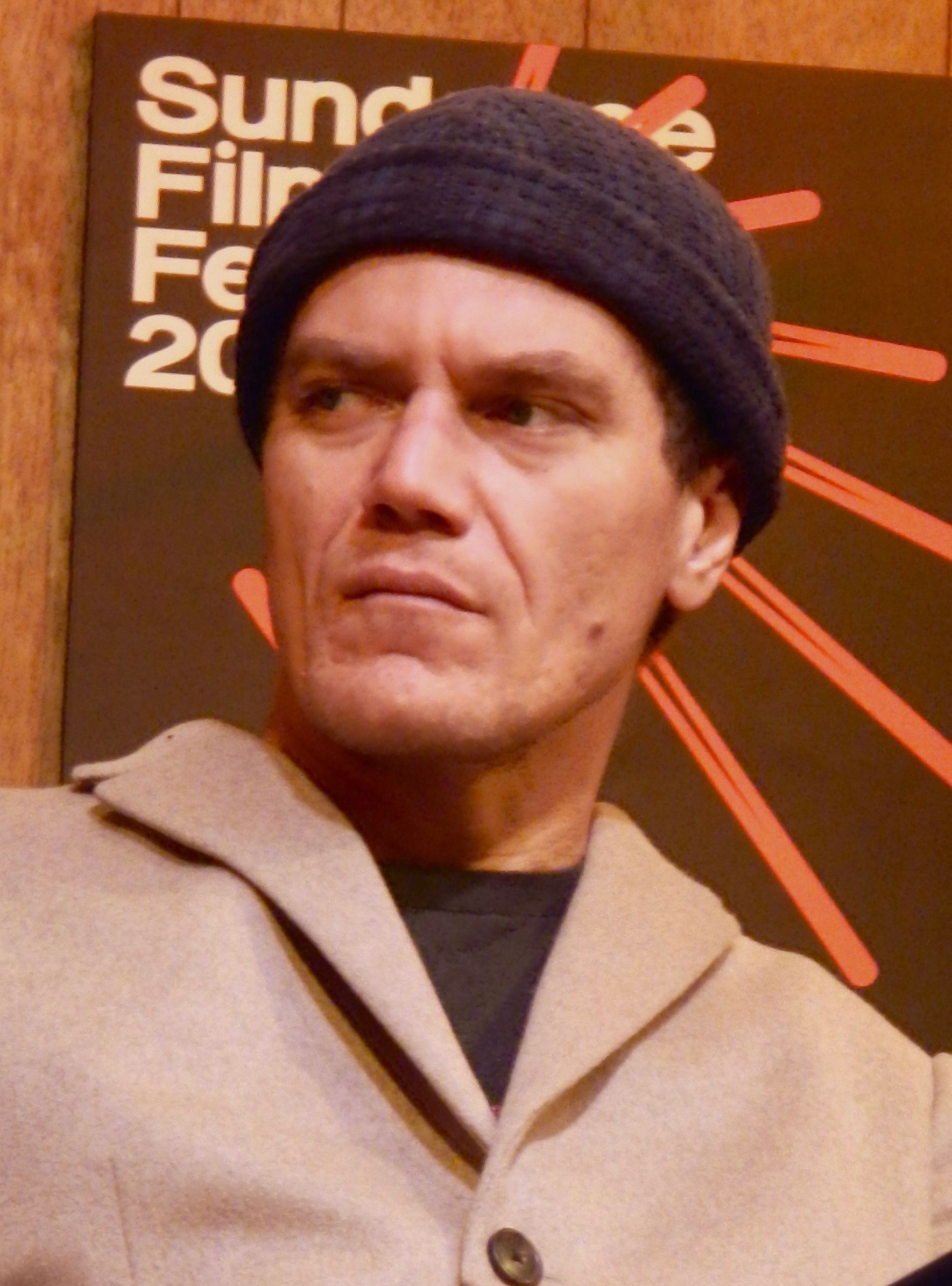
Michael Shannon, Best Actor winner

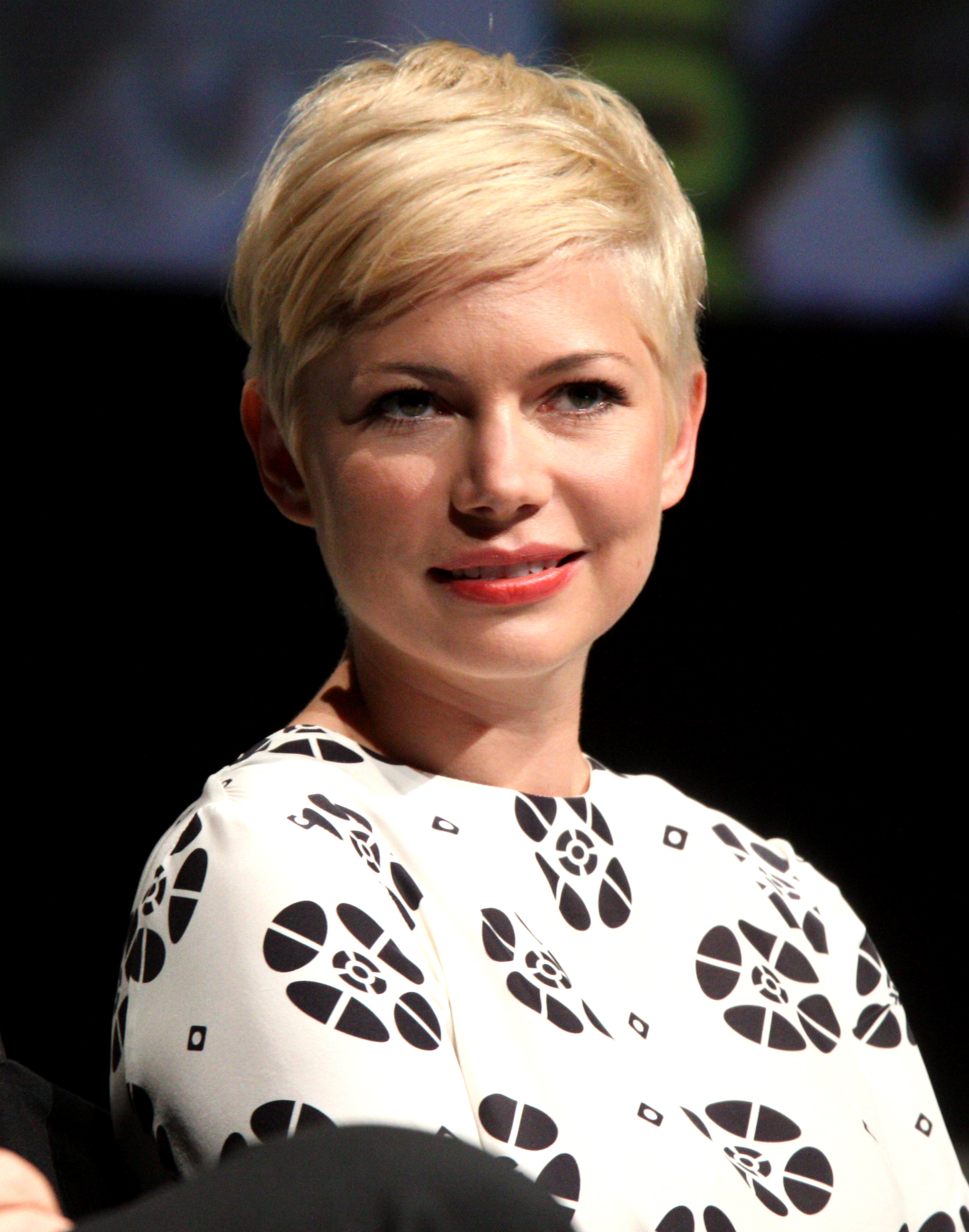
Michelle Williams, Best Actress winner

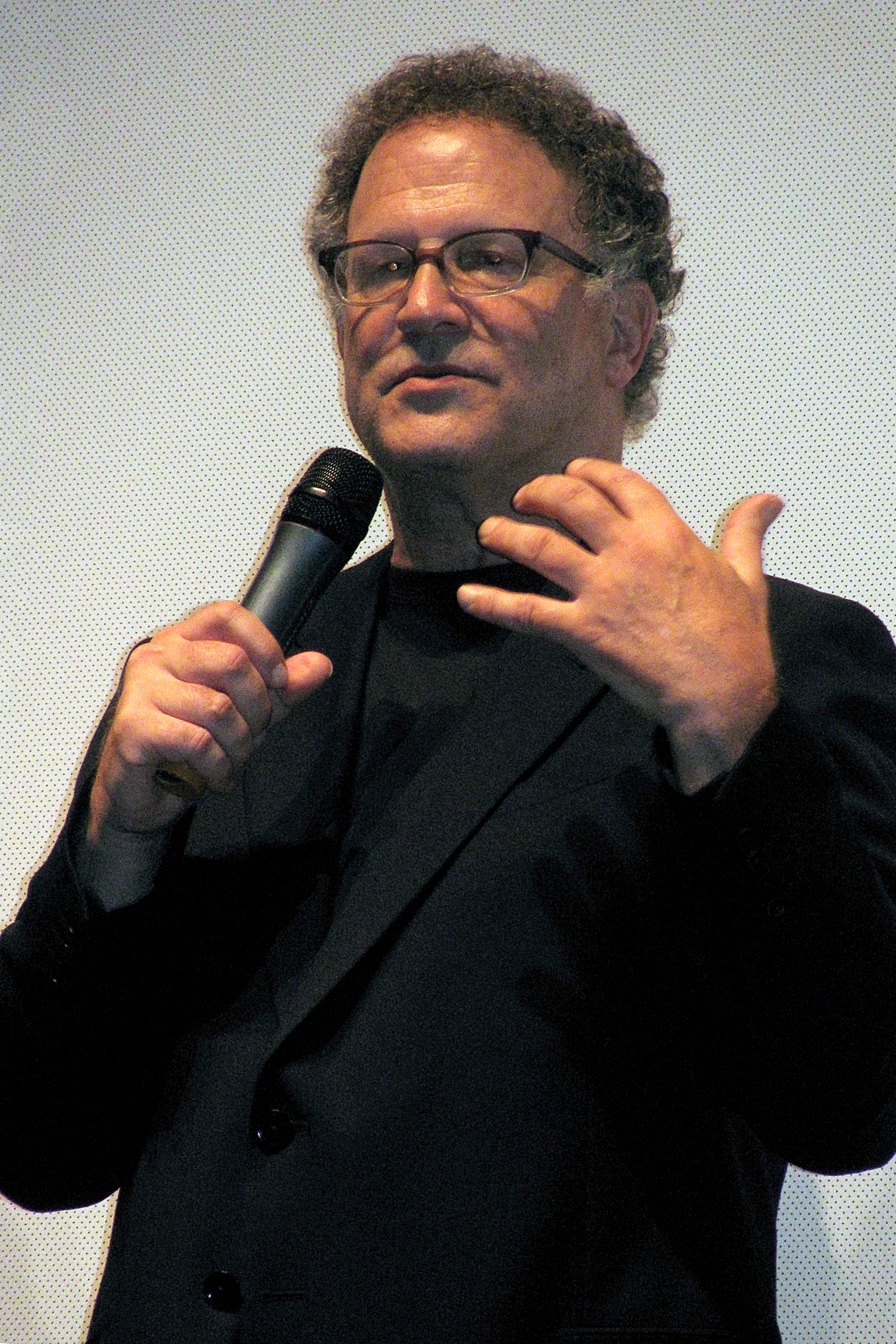
Albert Brooks, Best Supporting Actor winner

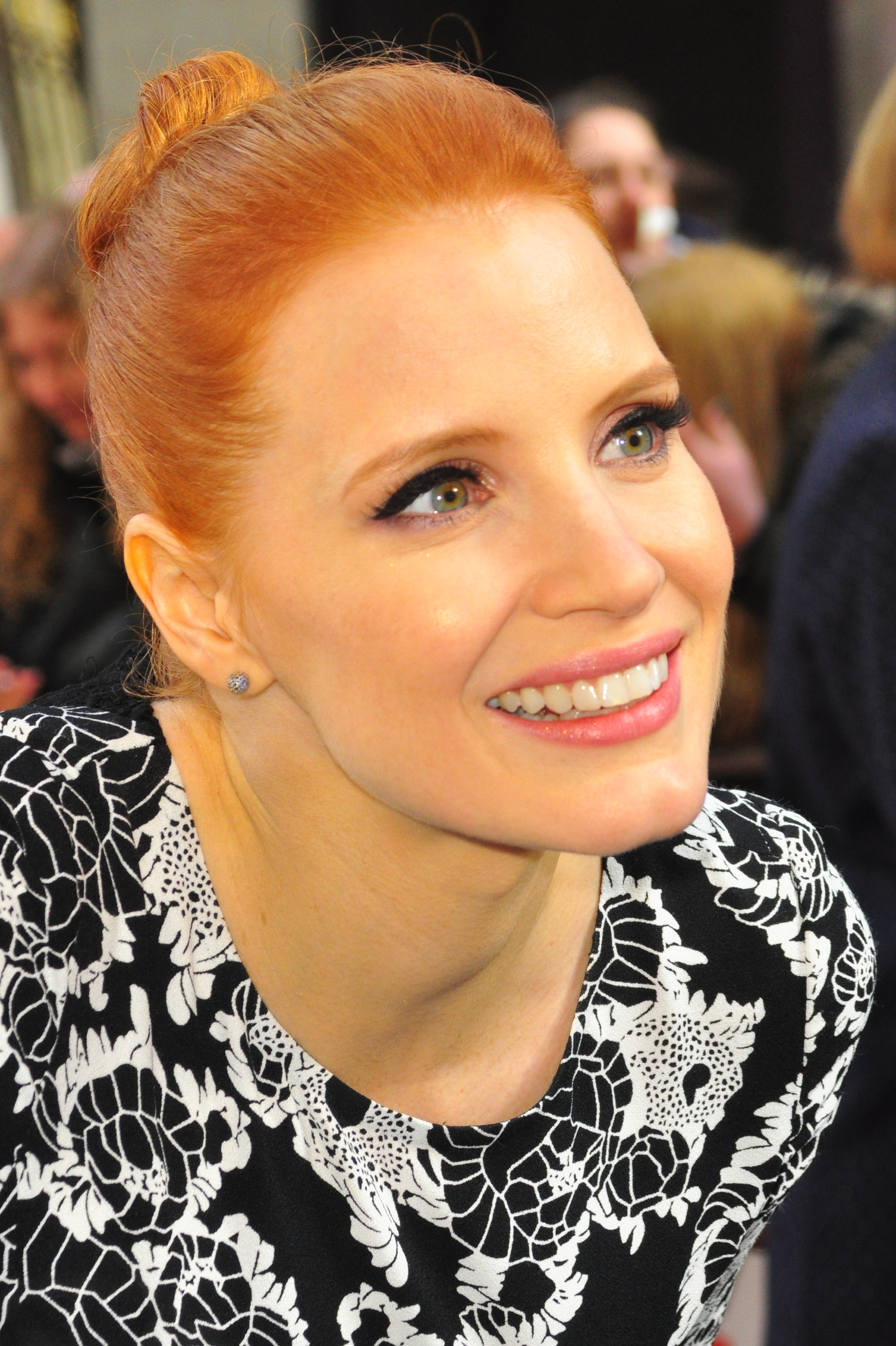
Jessica Chastain, Best Supporting Actress winner

=== Best Actor ===
Michael Shannon – Take Shelter

- George Clooney – The Descendants
- Jean Dujardin – The Artist
- Michael Fassbender – Shame
- Gary Oldman – Tinker Tailor Soldier Spy

=== Best Actress ===
Michelle Williams – My Week with Marilyn

- Kirsten Dunst – Melancholia
- Elizabeth Olsen – Martha Marcy May Marlene
- Anna Paquin – Margaret
- Meryl Streep – The Iron Lady

=== Best Animated Film ===
Rango

- The Adventures of Tintin: The Secret of the Unicorn
- Arthur Christmas
- Puss in Boots
- Winnie the Pooh

=== Best Cinematography ===
The Tree of Life – Emmanuel Lubezki

- Drive – Newton Thomas Sigel
- Hugo – Robert Richardson
- Melancholia – Manuel Alberto Claro
- War Horse – Janusz Kamiński

=== Best Director ===
Terrence Malick – The Tree of Life

- Michel Hazanavicius – The Artist
- Alexander Payne – The Descendants
- Martin Scorsese – Hugo
- Nicolas Winding Refn – Drive

=== Best Documentary Film ===
The Interrupters

- Cave of Forgotten Dreams
- Into the Abyss
- Pina
- Project Nim
- Tabloid

=== Best Film ===
The Tree of Life

- The Artist
- The Descendants
- Drive
- Hugo

=== Best Foreign Language Film ===
A Separation, Iran

- In a Better World, Denmark/Sweden
- Incendies, Canada
- The Skin I Live In, Spain
- Uncle Boonmee Who Can Recall His Past Lives, Thailand

=== Best Original Score ===
Drive – Cliff Martinez

- The Artist – Ludovic Bource
- The Girl with the Dragon Tattoo – Trent Reznor and Atticus Ross
- Hanna – The Chemical Brothers
- Hugo – Howard Shore

=== Best Screenplay – Adapted ===
Moneyball – Steven Zaillian and Aaron Sorkin

- The Descendants – Alexander Payne, Nat Faxon and Jim Rash
- Drive – Hossein Amini
- Hugo – John Logan
- Tinker Tailor Soldier Spy – Bridget O'Connor and Peter Straughan

=== Best Screenplay – Original ===
The Artist – Michel Hazanavicius

- Martha Marcy May Marlene – Sean Durkin
- Midnight in Paris – Woody Allen
- A Separation – Asghar Farhadi
- The Tree of Life – Terrence Malick

=== Best Supporting Actor ===
Albert Brooks – Drive

- Nick Nolte – Warrior
- Patton Oswalt – Young Adult
- Brad Pitt – The Tree of Life
- Christopher Plummer – Beginners

=== Best Supporting Actress ===
Jessica Chastain – The Tree of Life

- Melissa McCarthy – Bridesmaids
- Carey Mulligan – Shame
- Octavia Spencer – The Help
- Shailene Woodley – The Descendants

=== Most Promising Filmmaker ===
Sean Durkin – Martha Marcy May Marlene

- J. C. Chandor – Margin Call
- Simon Curtis – My Week with Marilyn
- Drake Doremus – Like Crazy
- Tate Taylor – The Help

=== Most Promising Performer ===
Elizabeth Olsen – Martha Marcy May Marlene

- Liana Liberato – Trust
- Brit Marling – Another Earth
- Hunter McCracken – The Tree of Life
- Shailene Woodley – The Descendants
