= Electric Youth (band) =

Canadian synthpop duo

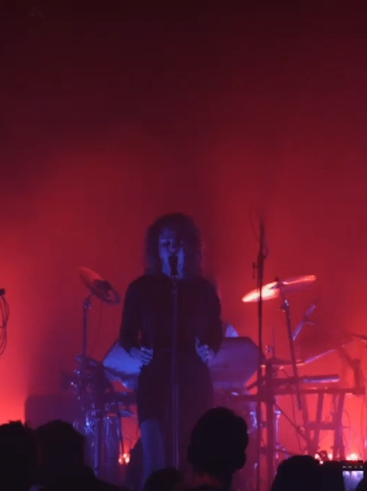
- Bronwyn Griffin, November 2014

Background information
- Origin: Toronto, Ontario, Canada
- Genre: Synth-pop
- Years active: 2008–present
- Labels: Milan Records; Last Gang; Secretly Canadian; Sony Music
- Members: Austin Garrick; Bronwyn Griffin

Electric Youth is a Canadian synth-pop duo from Toronto, Ontario consisting of Bronwyn Griffin (vocals, songwriter) and Austin Garrick (producer, songwriter, synthesizer, drums).

== Career ==
Garrick and Griffin have been dating since grade 8. Their initial breakthrough came in 2011 when their song "A Real Hero", created in association with College, was prominently featured in the movie Drive. The song was written by Garrick, in part about Chesley Sullenberger and the crash landing of Flight 1549. "A Real Hero" was nominated for a 2012 MTV Movie Award in the category of "Best Music".

Spin magazine named "A Real Hero" one of the 20 Best Songs of 2011.

Contrary to some reports in the press, the group did not name themselves after Electric Youth, the 1989 album by pop singer Debbie Gibson. Garrick explained to Rolling Stone magazine about the group's sound:

The thought of recreating the past with music is not interesting to us, it's probably been the biggest misconception of our music and what we're about thus far. The reality is, we're much more interested in creating things for the future than things from the past. We are nostalgic people, not in the sense that we long for a different time, because we love the present, but how could we not be reminded of the past when every day, we see the person we had a crush on since 7th grade?

In late 2013, Electric Youth signed with Last Gang Records and Secretly Canadian. On September 30, 2014, the band released their debut album Innerworld through Last Gang Records in Canada and Secretly Canadian in the rest of the world, debuting at #13 on the Billboard Top Dance Electronic Albums chart. Innerworld was produced by Electric Youth. Vince Clarke (Erasure/Yazoo/Depeche Mode) and Peter Mayes (PNAU/Empire of the Sun) provided additional production, and the album was mixed by Mayes. Innerworld includes previously released tracks "The Best Thing" and "A Real Hero (feat College)". It received wide critical acclaim including NME and NPR First Listen.

Rolling Stone declared Electric Youth one of the Ten Artists You Need To Know in 2014.

Electric Youth carried out their first headlining tour across the US and Canada in November 2014.

In 2019, Electric Youth released their second studio album Memory Emotion, receiving a Juno Award nomination for Electronic Album of the Year.

Electric Youth released a digital and 2LP vinyl 10th anniversary edition of Innerworld in 2024 featuring three bonus remix tracks.

== Discography ==
Studio albums

- Innerworld (2014) (Secretly Canadian/Last Gang)
- Breathing (Original Motion Picture Soundtrack from a Lost Film) (2017) (Milan)
- Memory Emotion (2019) (Watts Arcade Inc./Last Gang)
- Come True (Original Motion Picture Soundtrack) (2021) (Sony Music)
- North of Normal (2025) (Original Motion Picture Soundtrack) (Milan)

Singles/EPs

- A Real Hero with College (2011) (Watts Arcade)
- Right Back to You (2011) (Watts Arcade)
- Best Thing (2012) (Watts Arcade)
- Innocence (2014) (Promo single)
- Modern Fears (2014) (Secretly Canadian)
- Runaway (2014) (Secretly Canadian/Last Gang)
- The Life (2019) (Electric Youth Music Inc.)
- Arawa (2019) (Electric Youth Music Inc.)
- Breathless (2019) (Electric Youth Music Inc.)
