= World Soundtrack Awards 2012 =

Belgian music awards ceremony

12th World Soundtrack Awards

October 20, 2012

Best Original Soundtrack:
Tinker Tailor Soldier Spy

The 12th World Soundtrack Awards were given on 20 October 2012 at the Kuipke Events Centre in Ghent, Belgium.

== Awards ==
=== World Soundtrack of the Year ===
Tinker Tailor Soldier Spy by Alberto Iglesias

- The Adventures of Tintin: The Secret of the Unicorn by John Williams
- Hugo by Howard Shore
- Drive by Cliff Martinez
- The Ides of March by Alexandre Desplat

=== Soundtrack Composer of the Year ===
Alberto Iglesias for Tinker Tailor Soldier Spy, The Skin I Live In & The Monk

- Howard Shore for A Dangerous Method, Cosmopolis & Hugo
- Alexandre Desplat for Moonrise Kingdom, The Ides of March, Extremely Loud and Incredibly Close, A Better Life, Carnage & Rust and Bone
- Cliff Martinez for Contagion & Drive
- John Williams for War Horse & The Adventures of Tintin: The Secret of the Unicorn

=== Best Original Song Written for Film ===
Glenn Close (lyrics), Sinéad O'Connor (performer), Brian Byrne (music) for "Lay Your Head Down" in Albert Nobbs

- Florence Welch (lyrics/music), Isabella Summers (lyrics/music), Florence + the Machine (performer) for "Breath of Life" in Snow White and the Huntsman
- Madonna (music/lyrics/performer), Julie Frost (music/lyrics), James Harry (music/lyrics) for "Masterpiece in W.E.
- Damon Thomas (music/lyrics), Thomas Newman (music/lyrics), Harvey Mason, Jr. (music/lyrics), Mary J. Blige (music/lyrics/performer) for "The Living Proof" in The Help
- Bret McKenzie (music/lyrics), Peter Linz (performer), Jason Segel (performer) for "Man or Muppet" in The Muppets

=== Discovery of the Year ===
Albert Nobbs by Brian Byrne

- Immortals by Trevor Morris
- Take Shelter by David Wingo
- Lola Versus & Nobody Walks by Fall On Your Sword
- The Raven, Sleep Tight, Cold Light of Day by Lucas Vidal

=== Public Choice Award ===
Abel Korzeniowski for W.E.

=== Lifetime Achievement Award ===
Pino Donaggio
