= A Real Hero =

Single by College and Electric Youth

from the album Innerworld
- Released: 11 January 2010
- Genre: Synth-pop
- Length: 4:27
- Label: Valerie Records
- Songwriters: Austin Garrick; David Grellier

"A Real Hero" is a song by French electronica artist College in collaboration with Electric Youth, released in 2010. The song was included as the eleventh track on Electric Youth's debut studio album Innerworld. The track was used as a main theme in the 2011 film Drive, directed by Nicolas Winding Refn and starring Ryan Gosling and Carey Mulligan.

== Production ==
Electric Youth frontman Austin Garrick, along with David Grellier, who performs as College, have cited separate inspirations for producing the song.

Garrick was inspired to write the song by a quote from his grandfather, who spoke of airline captain Chesley Sullenberger after the US Airways Flight 1549 water landing incident. Garrick's grandfather referred to Sullenberger as "a real human being and a real hero", which became the song's refrain. The second verse of the song, which includes the line "155 people on board", refers to the 155 survivors of US 1549.

Grellier, on the other hand, drew inspiration from cinema, particularly the character Max Rockatansky from the Mad Max franchise. Grellier has stated that he "wanted to give a homage to that lonely hero that we see in movies like Mad Max. People who make their own choice and try to save lives. I want to give an homage." The first verse of the song is more along these lines and could be taken to be about Mad Max himself, although it could also be about Sullenberger.

== Cover versions ==
Indie pop group Smallpools released a cover version of the song on May 12, 2015, through RCA Records and Sony Music Entertainment. Indie group High Highs also released a cover version in their 2014 album Open Season, through Never Leave Never Sleep.

== Track listing ==
Digital download
No.	Title	Writer(s)	Producer(s)	Length
1.	"A Real Hero"	Austin Garrick, David Grellier	Garrick, Grellier	4:27
2.	"Closer"	Grellier	Grellier	1:35
3.	"Critical Mass"	Grellier	Grellier	4:12
4.	"The Mirage Makers"	Grellier	Grellier	1:21
5.	"Susan Waiting"	Grellier	Grellier	2:21

== Personnel ==
- Bronwyn Griffin – vocals
- Austin Garrick – production, writing
- David Grellier – production

== Certifications ==
Region	Certification	Certified units/sales
United Kingdom (BPI)	Silver	200,000^{‡}
^{‡} Sales+streaming figures based on certification alone.

== Release history and reception ==
Country	Date	Format	Label
France	January 11, 2010	Digital download	Valerie
United Kingdom	January 11, 2010	Digital download	Valerie
United States	January 11, 2010	Digital download	Valerie

Spin magazine named "A Real Hero" one of the 20 Best Songs of 2011. The song was nominated for a 2012 MTV Movie Award in the category of "Best Music".

== In popular culture ==
- The song is featured in the 2011 film Drive and the 2012 film Taken 2.
