= Drive (2011 film) =

American action drama film by Nicolas Winding Refn

- Theatrical release poster
- Directed by: Nicolas Winding Refn
- Screenplay by: Hossein Amini
- Based on: Drive by James Sallis
- Produced by: Marc Platt; Adam Siegel; Gigi Pritzker; Michel Litvak; John Palermo
- Starring: Ryan Gosling; Carey Mulligan; Bryan Cranston; Christina Hendricks; Ron Perlman; Oscar Isaac; Albert Brooks
- Cinematography: Newton Thomas Sigel
- Edited by: Matthew Newman
- Music by: Cliff Martinez
- Production companies: Bold Films; OddLot Entertainment; Marc Platt Productions; Motel Movies
- Distributed by: FilmDistrict
- Release dates: May 20, 2011 (Cannes); September 16, 2011 (United States)
- Running time: 100 minutes
- Country: United States
- Language: English
- Budget: $15 million
- Box office: $81.4 million

Drive is a 2011 American action drama film directed by Nicolas Winding Refn. The screenplay, written by Hossein Amini, is based on James Sallis's 2005 novel. The film stars Ryan Gosling as an unnamed Hollywood stunt driver who moonlights as a getaway driver. He quickly grows fond of his neighbor, Irene (Carey Mulligan) and her young son, Benicio. When her debt-ridden husband, Standard (Oscar Isaac), is released from prison, the two men take part in what turns out to be a failed million-dollar heist that endangers the lives of everyone involved. The film co-stars Bryan Cranston, Albert Brooks, Christina Hendricks, and Ron Perlman.

Producers Marc Platt and Adam Siegel optioned the source novel after Siegel read a review from Publishers Weekly. Adapting the book proved to be challenging for Amini, as it had a nonlinear narrative. Gosling, one of Platt's top casting choices, eventually signed on for the lead, as he wanted to star in an action-oriented project. Gosling played a pivotal role in the film's production, which included hiring Refn as director and Beth Mickle as production designer. Newton Thomas Sigel oversaw the principal photography, which started on September 25, 2010, was shot on location in Los Angeles, and ended on November 12.

Before its September 2011 release, Drive had been shown at the 64th Cannes Film Festival, earning Refn the Best Director Award. The film was praised for its direction, cinematography, performances (particularly Gosling and Brooks's), visuals, action sequences, and musical score; however, some critics were appalled by its graphic violence and found it to be potentially detrimental to the film's box office success. Nonetheless, the film was still a commercial success, grossing over $81 million against a production budget of $15 million. Several critics listed Drive as one of the best films of 2011, including the National Board of Review. Its accolades include a nomination for Best Sound Editing at the 84th Academy Awards. The film has garnered a cult following since release.

== Plot ==
A man in Los Angeles (billed as "The Driver") works as a mechanic, stunt double, and criminal-for-hire getaway driver. His jobs are all managed by auto shop owner Shannon, who persuades Jewish-American mobster Bernie Rose and his half-Italian partner Nino "Izzy" Paolozzi to purchase a stock car for the Driver to race as a legitimate business for them all.

The Driver grows close to his new neighbor, Irene, and her young son, Benicio, but their relationship is interrupted when Irene's husband, Standard Gabriel, is released from prison. While in prison, Standard owed protection money to an Albanian gangster named Cook, who demands Standard rob a pawn shop for $40,000 to pay off the debt, threatening to harm Benicio and Irene. Driver offers to act as the getaway driver for Standard and Blanche, Cook's accomplice.

At the pawn shop, Blanche exits with a bag of money, but Standard is killed by the store owner. Another car waiting in the parking lot immediately pursues them, but Driver shakes it off. Hiding at a motel, a suspicious Driver forces Blanche to admit she and Cook planned to take the money for themselves, and Cook's henchmen were in the waiting car. She also reveals the bag holds $1 million. Informed by her text messages, two gunmen locate the motel room and one kills Blanche. Driver, in return, kills both gunmen.

Shannon offers to hide the money, but Driver declines. Interrogating Cook at a strip club, he learns that Nino was behind the robbery. The Driver calls Nino and offers to return the money in exchange for peace. However, Nino instead sends a hitman to the Driver and Irene's apartment building. The Driver tells an angry Irene about his involvement with her husband's death, and they enter the elevator, not realizing the hitman is waiting inside. Noticing the man's gun, the Driver kisses Irene goodbye. He subdues and brutally stomps the hitman to death in front of a horrified Irene.

The Driver confronts Shannon, who reveals that he called Bernie about the money and unwittingly mentioned Irene. Furious, the Driver tells Shannon to flee, as Nino will surely hunt them both. Nino reveals to Bernie that a low-level Philadelphia mobster stashed the money at the pawn shop to set up a new operation. Anyone tied to the robbery must be killed, as they could lead the East Coast Italian-American Mafia to Nino and Bernie. Angry at learning that Shannon must die, Bernie violently murders Cook.

Later that night, Bernie visits Shannon at his shop, and fatally slashes Shannon's forearm with a straight razor when he refuses to divulge information. The Driver discovers Shannon's corpse at the auto shop. He disguises himself with a rubber stuntman's mask and follows Nino from the pizzeria to the Pacific Coast Highway. He rams Nino's car onto a beach, killing his driver, before drowning him in the ocean. He calls Irene and tells her that he will not return, explaining that she and Benicio were the best part of his life.

The Driver meets with Bernie, who promises that Irene will be safe in exchange for the money. At the Driver's car, Bernie stabs him in the stomach, but he stabs Bernie to death and manages to drive away, leaving Bernie's corpse and the money behind. Irene knocks on the Driver's apartment door and leaves when no one responds. Although wounded, the Driver drives into the night, his fate ultimately unknown.

== Cast ==
- Ryan Gosling as "The Driver"
- Carey Mulligan as Irene Gabriel
- Bryan Cranston as Shannon
- Albert Brooks as Bernie Rose
- Oscar Isaac as Standard Gabriel
- Christina Hendricks as Blanche
- Ron Perlman as Nino 'Izzy' Paolozzi
- Kaden Leos as Benicio Gabriel
- James Biberi as Chris "Cook"
- Russ Tamblyn as Doc

== Production ==
=== Development ===
I felt that the way the world was presented in the book demanded that its true grit be retained in the script. The grit comes from seeing the world from the point of view of the driver in the car.

— Marc Platt, producer

The novel Drive by James Sallis was published in 2005. Producers Marc Platt and Adam Siegel of Marc Platt Productions optioned the novel after Siegel read a review in Publishers Weekly. The Driver intrigued Siegel because he was "the kind of character you rarely see anymore — he was a man with a purpose; he was very good at one thing and made no apologies for it". The character interested Platt, because he reminded him of movie heroes he looked up to as a child, characters typically portrayed by Steve McQueen or Clint Eastwood.

Hossein Amini adapted the novel for the screen. He felt it was a rare book to receive from a studio because it was short, gloomy, and like a poem. Since the novel does not present a linear story, but has many flashbacks and jumps around in time, Amini found the adaptation challenging. He felt the non-linear structure made it "a very tricky structure" for a feature film.

A film adaptation of Drive was first announced in early 2008, with Neil Marshall set to direct what was being described as "an L.A.-set action mystery", planned as a starring vehicle for Hugh Jackman. Universal Studios, which had tried to make a film version for some time, was also on board. By February 2010, Marshall and Jackman were no longer attached to the project.

Platt contacted actor Ryan Gosling about Drive early on. Platt explained: "I have this list that I've created of very talented individuals whose work inspire me — writers, directors, actors whom I have to work with before I go onto another career or do something else with my life." Despite having starred in films of diverse genres, Gosling had never starred in anything like Drive but had been interested in acting in an action-oriented project. Gosling said that he had been put off by the many current action genre films that focused more on stunts instead of characters. He responded to Platt about two days later, as he was strongly attracted to the plot and the leading role. He thought the story had a "very strong character" at its core, and a "powerful" romance.

In an interview with Rotten Tomatoes, Gosling was asked what had attracted him to the film, and whether he had read the earlier script when Jackman and director Neil Marshall were attached to it. He said:

I think that might be the original one I read. I read a few drafts. I read one as well where he wasn't a stunt driver at all, which was a newer draft – maybe that's the one Hugh Jackman had; I'm not sure exactly. Basically when I read it, in trying to figure out who would do something like this, the only way to make sense of this is that this is a guy that's seen too many movies, and he's started to confuse his life for a film.

When Gosling signed on for the leading role, he was allowed to choose the director, a first in his career. He chose Danish filmmaker Nicolas Winding Refn. "It had to be [him]. There was no other choice."

When Refn read the first screenplay for Drive, he was more intrigued by the concept of a man having a split personality, being a stuntman by day and a getaway driver at night, than the plot of the story. Believing that the director might be intimidated by the script, as it was unlike anything he had done before, Gosling had concerns about whether Refn wanted to participate. Refn took on the project without hesitation.

On the podcast It happened in Hollywood with Seth Abramovitch, Refn recounts meeting with Gosling after his initial plans to direct Paul Schrader's Dying of the Light fell through following creative disagreements with actor Harrison Ford:

"Ryan had reached out because he liked what I made and simultaneously there had been this book called Drive, which I think was bought by Universal originally to adapt into some kind of like franchise action film. The book's very minimalistic and very good but I wouldn't say it's very commercial but it had turned into more of a vehicle and it wasn't really my thing. But when Ryan and I met, we had a very interesting meeting. I had a high fever so I was there but high as a kite because I had these very severe, hard American anti flu drugs that made you zoned out and I couldn't really move. We had a very peculiar conversation where we didn't really talk. We didn't look at each other because I couldn't move my body. After a very uneventful dinner, I asked him to take me home and he was very kind to do so. As he's driving me back to Santa Monica where I was staying, we were driving in silence like a blind date gone terrible. He turns on the radio to the soft rock station... I'm a sucker for a great rock ballad and "Can't Fight This Feeling" by REO Speedwagon kicks in. Ryan's just driving as our song layers out of the stereo and I build myself up into some kind of frenzy and start to sing to the song. A lot of things were happening... I had just had my second daughter and felt bad about being away. I thought 'What was I doing here of all places in LA?'. I kind of just started to cry, tears rolling down my cheeks as I'm singing this song. It was sort of a catharsis because I just got this feeling I couldn't fight anymore, like the lyrics. I turned to Ryan and, because the music was so loud, screamed very loudly 'I got it. I know what we're going to make. We're going to make a film about a man who drives around at night listening to music because that's his emotional relief' and Ryan looked at me and said 'I'm in'."

=== Casting ===
When casting roles in his films, Refn does not watch casting tapes or have his actors audition for him. Instead, he meets with them and casts them on the spot if he feels they are right. Drive was the first film that British actress Carey Mulligan signed to do after being nominated for an Academy Award for her role in An Education (2009), which was directed by Danish filmmaker Lone Scherfig, a good friend of Refn who had babysat him as a child. At the time of Mulligan's casting, Refn had not seen An Education, but his wife was a fan of the film and Mulligan's performance, and urged him to cast her. In the original script, the character was a Hispanic woman named Irina. The character was changed to Irene after Mulligan was cast; Refn said that he "couldn't find any actress that would click with [him] personally".

While working on the film, Refn had some cast and production members move in temporarily with him, his wife and two daughters in their home in Los Angeles. This included Carey Mulligan and Hossein Amini, the screenwriter. This enabled them to be immersed in the film. Refn and Amini made significant changes to the original script during this time.

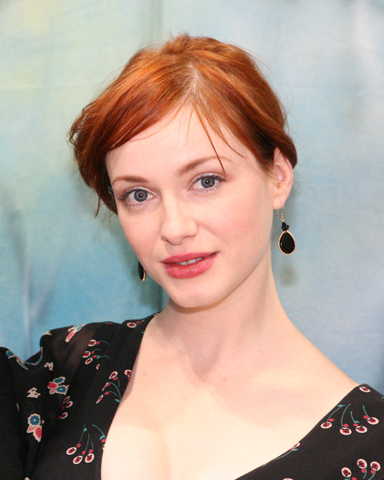
Having seen photos of Christina Hendricks (pictured) and finding her very beautiful, Refn's wife recommended her for the role of Blanche.

Bryan Cranston plays the role of Shannon. Refn knew he wanted to cast Cranston, as he was a fan of his work in the TV series Breaking Bad. Knowing Cranston had other opportunities, Refn asked the actor how he would like to develop the role. After not hearing back, Refn called him; Cranston was just then writing the pros and cons of doing Drive for himself. Moved by Refn's interest, Cranston accepted the part. Christina Hendricks plays the small role of Blanche. "Trying to work in a more reality arena for a character like that," Refn originally auditioned porn stars for Blanche. He was unable to find anyone with the necessary acting talent. After meeting with Hendricks, he decided to cast her, as he felt her persona would click with the character.

Albert Brooks plays the foul-mouthed, morose Bernie Rose. When Refn suggested him, Gosling agreed but thought the actor might not want to play a character who is violent and sullen or appear in a film that he did not work on himself. Brooks accepted the role to go against type, and because he loved that Bernie was not a cliché.

There are six people you could always get to play this kind of part, and I like that the director was thinking outside of the box. For me, it was an opportunity to act outside the box. I liked that this mobster had real style. Also, he doesn't get up in the morning thinking about killing people. He's sad about it. Upset about it. It's a case of, 'Look what you made me do.'

Nino, a key villain, is portrayed by Ron Perlman, one of the last actors to join the cast. Refn said, "The character of Nino was originally not particularly interesting, so I asked Ron why he wanted to be in my movie when he's done so many great films. When Perlman said, 'I always wanted to play a Jewish man who wants to be an Italian gangster', and I asked why, and he said, 'because that's what I am – a Jewish boy from New York', well, that automatically cemented it for me." Oscar Isaac portrays a Latino convict named Standard, who is married to Irene and is released from prison a week after Irene meets The Driver. Finding the role somewhat unappealing, he developed the archetypal character into something more.

He said of the role:

As soon as I sat down with Nicolas, he explained this universe and world of the story, so we made the character into someone interested in owning a restaurant, someone who made some wrong decisions in his life, ending up in a bad place. By making 'Standard' more specific and more interesting, we found that it made the story that more compelling.

=== Filming and cinematography ===
The film was made on a production budget of about $15 million and shot in various parts of Los Angeles, beginning on September 25, 2010. Locations were picked by Refn while Gosling drove him around the city at night. At the director's request, Los Angeles was picked as the shooting location due to budget constraints. Refn moved into a plush Los Angeles home and insisted that the cast members and screenwriter Amini move in with him. They would work on the script and film all day, then watch films, edit, or drive at night. Refn asked that the editing suite be placed in his home as well. With a shooting script of 81 pages, Refn and Gosling continued to trim dialogue during filming.

The opening chase scene, involving Gosling's character, was filmed primarily by Refn within the car's interior. In an interview, he said he intended for this scene to emulate the feeling of a "diver in an ocean of sharks," and never left the vehicle during the car chase so that the audience can see what's happening from the character's point of view. To economize money and time, he shot the scene in two days. With two different set-ups prepared in the car, the director found it difficult to have mobility with the camera, so he would switch the camera to two additional set-ups nearby. As downtown Los Angeles had been rejuvenated, Refn avoided certain areas to maintain the novel's gloomy atmosphere. The scene was shot at low angles with minimal light.

The elevator sequence was shot without dialogue. Refn explained:

A scene like the elevator sequence in Drive, for instance, has no dialogue, just a series of stunning visuals and graphic imagery – that's a prime example of how the film conveys so many ideas and emotions through images rather than words.

— Matt Barone, Complex interview with Nicholas Winding Refn.

Before shooting the head-smashing scene, Refn spoke to Gaspar Noé and asked him how he had done a similar scene in his film Irréversible (2002). Crossing the line from romance to violence, the scene begins with the Driver and Irene kissing tenderly. What they share is really a goodbye kiss. The Driver becomes a kind of "werewolf," violently stomping the hit man's head in. Irene sees the Driver in a new light.

Of this scene, Refn said:

Every movie has to have a heart – a place where it defines itself – and in every movie I've made there's always a scene that does that. On Drive, it was hard for me to wrap my head around it. I realized I needed to show in one situation that Driver is the hopelessly romantic knight, but he's also completely psychotic and is willing to use any kind of violence to protect innocence. But that scene was never written. As I was going along, it just kind of popped up.

In March 2012, Interiors, an online journal concerned with the relationship between architecture and film, published an issue that discussed how space is used in this scene. The issue highlights Refn's use of constricted space and his way of creating a balance between romance and violence.

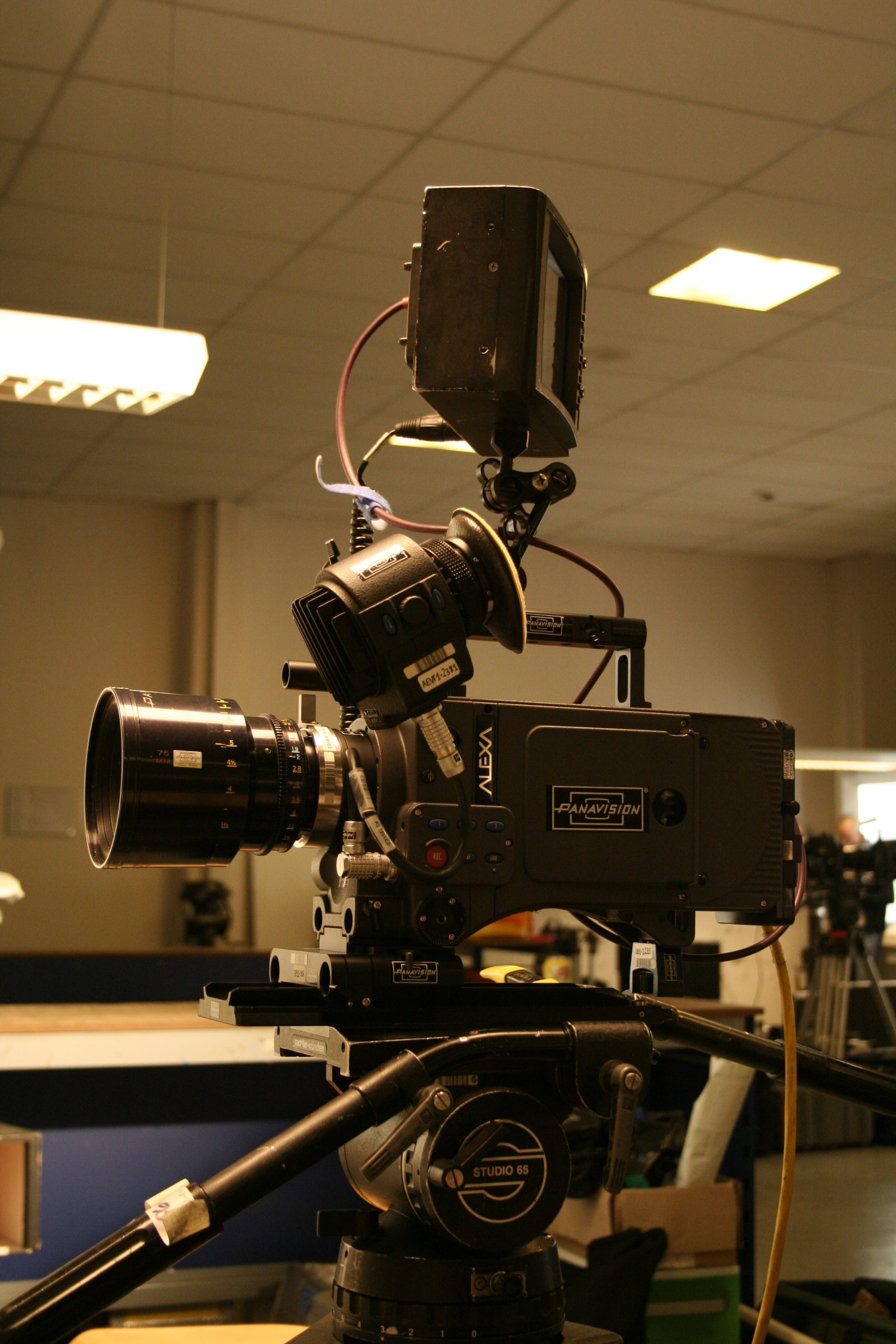
Refn shot Drive digitally with an Arri Alexa camera.

Using an Arri Alexa camera, cinematographer Newton Thomas Sigel shot the film digitally. According to executive producer David Lancaster, the film has abundant, evocative, intense images of Los Angeles that are not often seen. "From the little seen back streets of downtown LA to the dry arid outposts on the peaks of the desert landscape surrounding it, Siegel has re-imagined an LA all the way down to the rocky cliffs by the sea."

Car scenes were filmed with a "biscuit rig," a camera car rig developed for the film Seabiscuit (2003). It allowed stunt driver Robert Nagle to steer the car, freeing Gosling to concentrate on acting. Consistent with Refn's usual visual style, wide-angle lenses were used extensively by cinematographer Sigel, who avoided hand-held camera work. Preferring to keep the film more "grounded" and authentic, he also avoided the use of computer-generated imagery (CGI). Budget restrictions were also a factor in this decision.

Although many stunt drivers are credited, Gosling performed some stunts himself after completing a stunt driving car crash course. During the production, Gosling re-built the 1973 Chevrolet Chevelle Malibu used in the film, taking it apart and putting it back together. Gosling kept the car after filming had wrapped. Filming concluded on November 12, 2010.

Beth Mickle was hired as the film's production designer on Gosling's recommendation; they had worked together on 2006's Half Nelson. Prior to filming, Mickle supervised a crew of 40, routinely working 16- to 18-hour days. This was her most expensive film to date, and Mickle felt freer since "there was another zero added to the budget," compared to that of Half Nelson. The crew built the Driver's apartment building, which included a hallway and elevator that linked his unit to Irene's. Mickle also built a strip club set and Bernie Rose's apartment in an abandoned building. Turning a "run-of-the-mill" Los Angeles auto body shop into a grandiose dealership was one of the most challenging tasks. Painting the walls an electric blue color, she filled the showroom with vintage cars.

While Drive is set in the present day, it has a 1980s atmosphere, underlined by the vehicles, music, and clothes, and by the architecture. The parts of the city seen in the Valley and near downtown Los Angeles are cheap stucco and mirrored glass; the film excludes buildings constructed more recently. Drab background settings include the Southern California commercial strip. As the Los Angeles Times pointed out, whenever gleaming buildings are shown, it is because they are being seen from a distance. Refn shot those scenes from a helicopter at night in Bunker Hill, Los Angeles.

=== Style and inspiration ===
Thinking back, there isn't really all that much driving in Drive – a couple of chase scenes here and there, staged efficiently, thrillingly. It's more about the questionable choices that drive people – and, ultimately, the ones that drive them away.

— Associated Press reporter Christy Lemire

Andrew O'Hehir of Salon magazine described Drive as a "classic Los Angeles heist-gone-wrong story," that "isn't trying to outdo Bullitt or get the next assignment in The Fast and the Furious franchise". O'Hehir also described homages to "Roger Corman's B-movie aesthetic and the glossy Hollywood spectacles of Michael Mann". Steven Zeitchik of the Los Angeles Times examined themes in the characters of "loyalty, loneliness and the dark impulses that rise up even when we try our hardest to suppress them". Reuters' Nick Vinocur described a series of comic gore, resulting in "a bizarre concoction ... reminiscent of David Lynch's Mulholland Drive ... Quentin Tarantino's Pulp Fiction, and [with] angst-laden love scenes that would not be out of place in a Scandinavian drama". Christopher Hawthorne, also from the Los Angeles Times, has compared it to the works of Walter Hill, John Carpenter, Nathanael West, J. G. Ballard, and Mike Davis. According to Refn, Drive is dedicated to filmmaker Alejandro Jodorowsky and includes shades of Jodorowsky's existentialism.

Drive has been described as a tough, hard-edged, neo-noir, art house feature, extremely violent and very stylish, with European art and exploitation influences. Drive also refers to 1970s and 1980s cult hits such as The Day of the Locust (1975) and To Live and Die in L.A. (1985). Other influences can be seen in the neon-bright opening credits and the retro song picks – "a mix of tension-ratcheting synthesizer tones and catchy club anthems that collectively give the film its consistent tone". Drive's title sequence is hot-pink, which was inspired by Risky Business (1983). Refn has also indicated that the film's romance was partly inspired by the films of writer-director John Hughes.

Refn's inspiration for Drive came partly from reading Grimms' Fairy Tales, and his goal was to make "a fairy tale that takes Los Angeles as the background," with The Driver as the hero. To play with the common theme of fairy tales, The Driver protects what is good while at the same time killing degenerate people in violent ways. Refn said Drive turns into a superhero film during the elevator scene when The Driver kills the villain. The director said he was also inspired by films such as Point Blank (1967), Two-Lane Blacktop (1971), The Driver (1978), and Thief (1981). Jean-Pierre Melville's crime productions influenced the cinematography. Amini's script imposes "a kind of sideways moral code," where even those who comply with it are almost never rewarded for their efforts, as seen when The Driver helps Standard because of concern for Irene and her son. In their vehicles, the characters not only make escapes or commit murder but try to find peace and search for romance.

The Driver has been compared to the Man with No Name, a character portrayed by Clint Eastwood in Sergio Leone's Dollars Trilogy, because he almost never speaks, communicating mostly non-verbally. The Driver's meager dialogue is not designed to present him as tough, but to soften him. Refn chose to give The Driver very little dialogue and have him drive around listening to synth-pop music, taking control when it counts. Peter Debruge of Variety opined that what The Driver lacks in psychology, he makes up through action and stylish costuming. The Driver's wardrobe, in particular the satin jacket with the logo of a golden scorpion on the back, was inspired by the band Kiss, and Kenneth Anger's 1964 experimental film Scorpio Rising. Refn sees the former as the character's armor, and the logo as a sign of protection. According to reviewer Peter Canavese, the jacket is a reference to the fable of the Scorpion and the Frog, mentioned in the film, which evokes its use in the Orson Welles film Mr. Arkadin.

Drive would later serve as a major influence for many elements of the 2012 game Hotline Miami, including the minimalist plot, protagonist, use of dialogue, portrayal of violence, and visual/musical style.

== Music ==
Refn chose Johnny Jewel of Desire and Chromatics to score the film. The album consists of songs blended with electronic, ambient and retro music. Although Jewel's music was used in the score, at the last minute the studio hired experienced score composer Cliff Martinez. Refn gave him a sampling of songs he liked and asked Martinez to emulate the sound, resulting in "a kind of retro, 80ish, synthesizer europop". Most of its ethereal electronic-pop score was composed by Martinez. The score contains tracks with vintage keyboards and bluntly descriptive titles.

The film's iconic opening credits feature the synthwave track 'Nightcall' by French electronic musician Kavinsky.

Drive (Original Motion Picture Soundtrack) was released on CD on September 19, 2011, by Lakeshore Records. Prior to that, owing to viral reviews such as those found on Twitter, the soundtrack sold well on iTunes, climbing as high as number four on the sales charts. The album was released on vinyl in June 2012, by Mondo. It received positive responses and peaked the soundtrack list from Billboard and Official Charts Company, while also peaked at 30th position on the US Billboard 200. A re-scored soundtrack for the film was produced for the BBC by Zane Lowe for its television broadcast in October 2014, which included original music from Chvrches, Banks, Bastille, Eric Prydz, SBTRKT, Bring Me the Horizon, The 1975 and Laura Mvula.

In September 2016, Lakeshore and Invada Records released a fifth anniversary special edition pressing of the soundtrack, featuring new liner notes and artwork. That same month, Johnny Jewel, College, Electric Youth, and Cliff Martinez discussed the impact of the soundtrack and film on their lives and contemporary music culture. Jewel told Aaron Vehling that Drive's "blend of sonic and visual nostalgia with a contemporary spin is always deadly." The soundtrack was listed on Spin magazine's list of 40 Movie Soundtracks That Changed Alternative Music.

== Release ==
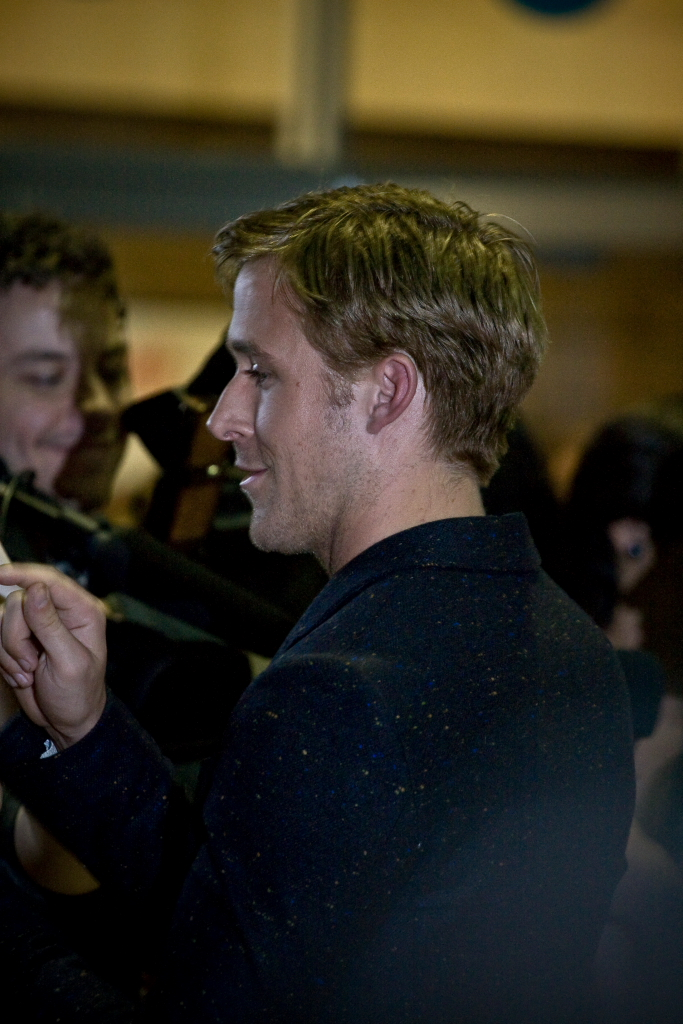
Ryan Gosling at Drive's Toronto International Film Festival premiere

Prior to beginning principal photography, Refn went to the 2010 Cannes Film Festival to sell the rights to Drive and released promotional posters for the film. In November 2010, FilmDistrict acquired North American distribution rights, the first major acquisition at the American Film Market that year, beating other studios including Summit Entertainment and Lionsgate. The owners were so eager to get their hands on Drive, that they started negotiating to buy it before seeing any footage, believing it could appeal to people who enjoy a genre movie, as well as the arthouse crowd. The film had a release date of September 16, 2011, in the United States.

The film premiered on May 20, in competition at the 2011 Cannes Film Festival. At its first showing the film received abundant praise and "some of the best responses of the festival," but Xan Brooks of The Guardian, who gave it a positive review, said it "can't win, won't win" Cannes's top prize. Brooks explained that "it's too self-consciously retro, too much a series of cool, blank surfaces as opposed to a rounded, textured drama," but said that it was his "guilty pleasure" of the 2011 competition, labeling it an enjoyable affair. He said,

Over the past 10 days we've witnessed great art and potent social commentary; the birth of the cosmos and the end of the world. Turns out what we really wanted all along was a scene in which a man gets his head stomped in a lift. They welcome it in like a long-lost relation.

The film was greeted with hoots and howls of joy from the media, with viewers cheering on some of the scenes featuring extreme violence. Drive received a 15-minute standing ovation from the crowd. The festival awarded Refn best director for Drive.

Drive was screened at the Los Angeles Film Festival (LAFF) on June 20 at its gala screenings program. It was among more than 200 feature films, short projects, and music videos, from more than 30 countries, to be shown during the festival. After Red Dog's release date was pushed up by several days, Drive replaced it as the Melbourne International Film Festival's closing night film. The film was also screened during FilmDistrict's studio panel presentation at San Diego Comic-Con. A secret screening for Drive was held at London's Empire Big Screen during the middle of August. In September, Drive screened as a special presentation during the 2011 Toronto International Film Festival, alongside another film starring Gosling, The Ides of March.

== Reception ==
=== Box office ===
Drive grossed $81.4 million worldwide. In North America, the film grossed a total of $35.1 million. The film opened in North America earning $11.3 million on the weekend of September 16, 2011, and played at 2,866 theaters. It was one of four wide releases that opened that weekend and came in second. The other three new releases included the re-release of The Lion King on 3D, which was the top film, along with the Straw Dogs remake and the romantic comedy I Don't Know How She Does It. The film closed its North American theatrical run on February 9, 2012.

In the international marketplace, Drive grossed $46.3 million. The film had its highest-grossing box office in France, where it earned a total of €10.3 million ($13.3 million). It opened in France on the weekend of October 5, 2011, at 246 theaters, eventually expanding to 360. The film opened in second place and had the highest per-screen theater gross for the weekend €10,722 ($13,786). Its second-highest overseas gross came in the United Kingdom, where it earned a total of £3.1 million ($4.6 million). Drive opened in the United Kingdom on September 27, 2011, at 176 theaters, eventually expanding to 190. The film opened in Australia on October 27, 2011, and grossed a total of $2.3 million in the country.

=== Critical response ===
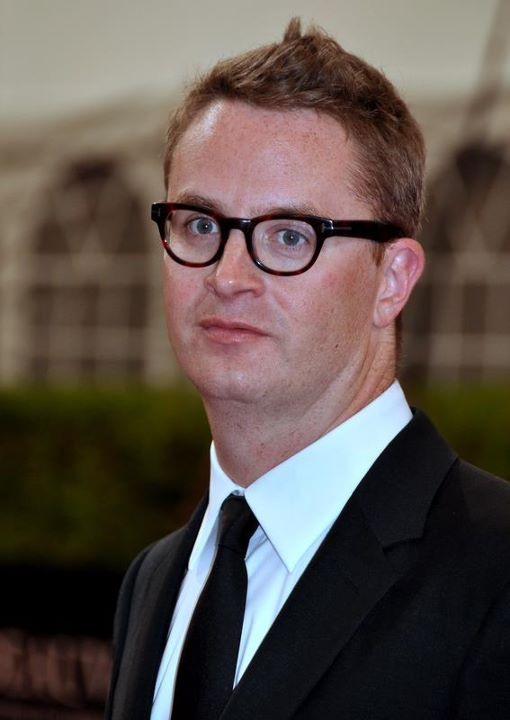
Director Nicolas Winding Refn at the film's presentation at the 2011 Deauville American Film Festival

Review aggregator Rotten Tomatoes reports an approval rating of 93% based on 275 reviews, and an average rating of 8.30/10. The site's critical consensus states, "With its hyper-stylized blend of violence, music, and striking imagery, Drive represents a fully realized vision of arthouse action." Metacritic, another review aggregator, gave it a score of 79 out of 100, based on 43 critics, indicating "generally favorable" reviews. Audiences polled by CinemaScore gave the film an average grade of "C−" on an A+ to F scale.

It was one of the highest-ranked, and most-featured, films on critics' year-end top 10 lists. It ranked as the fourth-best film of the year, behind The Tree of Life, The Artist, and Melancholia on Metacritic's tally of top 10 lists. Drive was picked as the best film of the year by: Peter Travers of Rolling Stone, Richard Roeper of the Chicago Sun-Times, James Rocchi of BoxOffice, Joshua Rothkopf of Time Out (New York), Neil Miller of Film School Rejects, Mark Russell of The Oregonian, and a staff critic from Empire magazine.

The writers for the film magazine Empire listed Drive as their number one film of 2011. Peter Travers of Rolling Stone gave the film 4 out of 4 stars, declaring that Drive was "a brilliant piece of nasty business," and that "Refn is a virtuoso, blending tough and tender with such uncanny skill that he deservedly won the Best Director prize at Cannes." Travers also said, "Prepare to be blown away by Albert Brooks. Brooks' performance, veined with dark humor and chilling menace (watch him with a blade), deserves to have Oscar calling." The Wall Street Journal's Joe Morgenstern also praised Brooks's performance, calling his villainous performance "sensational." James Rocchi of The Playlist gave the film an "A" letter grade, and wrote that "Drive works as a great demonstration of how, when there's true talent behind the camera, entertainment and art are not enemies but allies." Rocchi placed Drive as his number one film of 2011.

Movieline's Stephanie Zacharek rated the film 9.5 out of 10, complimenting the film's action and writing that it "defies all the current trends in mainstream action filmmaking. The driving sequences are shot and edited with a surgeon's clarity and precision. Refn doesn't chop up the action to fool us into thinking it's more exciting than it is." She also admired Refn's skill in handling the film's violence and the understated romance between Gosling and Mulligan. Drive was Roger Ebert's seventh-best film of 2011. In praising the film, he wrote, "Here is a movie with respect for writing, acting, and craft. It has respect for knowledgeable moviegoers." Like Zacharek, Ebert admired the film's action sequences, which were practically made and did not rely on CGI effects.

Anthony Lane wrote in The New Yorker that Drive's violence was far too graphic, and this ultimately was a detriment to the film. Referring to the violence, he said, "In grabbing our attention, he diverts it from what matters. The horror lingers and seeps; the feelings are sponged away." Michael Philips of the Chicago Tribune felt similarly, and said that although he enjoyed the film in the early sections, it became "one garishly sadistic set piece after another". Phillips thought the film relied too much on "stylistic preening" and did not have enough substance.

In 2014, The Huffington Post included Drive on its list of 8 Movies From The Last 15 Years That Are Super Overrated, with Bill Bradley criticizing the low amount of dialogue by Gosling's character and writing that "Refn spends all 100 minutes trying to convince you that he has a cool iPod playlist." WhatCulture included Ryan Gosling's role in top "10 Most Convincing Movie Psychopath Performances".

=== Legacy ===
Drive has gained a cult following since its release in 2011, particularly for Refn's stylized direction, silent protagonist, neon-inflicted visuals, and electronic soundtrack. It has been characterized as a crossover between arthouse and mainstream cinema, and its influence has been discussed in relation to contemporary visual style, music, fashion, and the revival of 1980s-inspired aesthetics.

The film's iconography and soundtrack remain popular and recognizable amongst cinephile circles. The Driver's satin scorpion jacket became one of the film's most recognizable images and developed a life of its own outside the film. Replicas of the jacket were produced following the film's release, while it became a recurring Halloween costume and a subject of fashion coverage. More than a decade after Drive's release, GQ described it as one of the most iconic pieces of cinematic outerwear of its generation and reported that costume designer Erin Benach was still most frequently asked about the jacket among her work.

The film's soundtrack, which features "Nightcall" by Kavinsky and "A Real Hero" by David Grellier (College) and "Electric Youth", is often credited with helping popularize synthwave music with a wider audience.

The film has been marked as Nicolas Winding Refn's breakout amongst the mainstream, despite having directed 7 films prior. Miles Surrey of The Ringer (website) writes:

Released in the same year as Fast Five, a delirious blockbuster that culminates with a giant vault tearing through the streets of Rio de Janeiro, Drive’s bravura opening highlighted that there’s more than one way to execute a nail-biting car chase, especially when operating on an indie budget. If the Fast & Furious franchise represented where Hollywood was headed—its street racers turning into physics-defying superheroes that would compete with the likes of Marvel—then Drive was a throwback molded by neo-noir classics like Bullitt, The Driver, and Thief (film). As far as first impressions go, Drive’s opening car chase was one hell of a table-setter; it’s among the strongest sequences of Refn’s entire career. At the same time, though, Drive is a microcosm of what makes the Danish auteur so polarizing.

Due to numerous thematic and narrative similarities to the Grand Theft Auto videogame series (particularly its earlier instalments), several observers have recognized Drive as one of the films closest to realizing a big screen adaptation of the series.

In 2025, it was one of the films voted for the "Readers' Choice" edition of The New York Times' list of "The 100 Best Movies of the 21st Century," finishing at number 129. In 2025, The Hollywood Reporter listed Drive as having the best stunts of 2011.

=== Accolades ===
Drive was nominated for four British Academy Film Awards, which included Best Film, Best Direction, Best Actress in a Supporting Role (Carey Mulligan), and Best Editing. It was one of the most-nominated films by critics' groups in 2011. Albert Brooks had the most nominations from critics' groups. Refn won the Best Director Award at the 64th Cannes Film Festival. The film also received an Academy Award nomination for Best Sound Editing.

== See also ==
- Heist films
