= Ryan Gosling filmography =

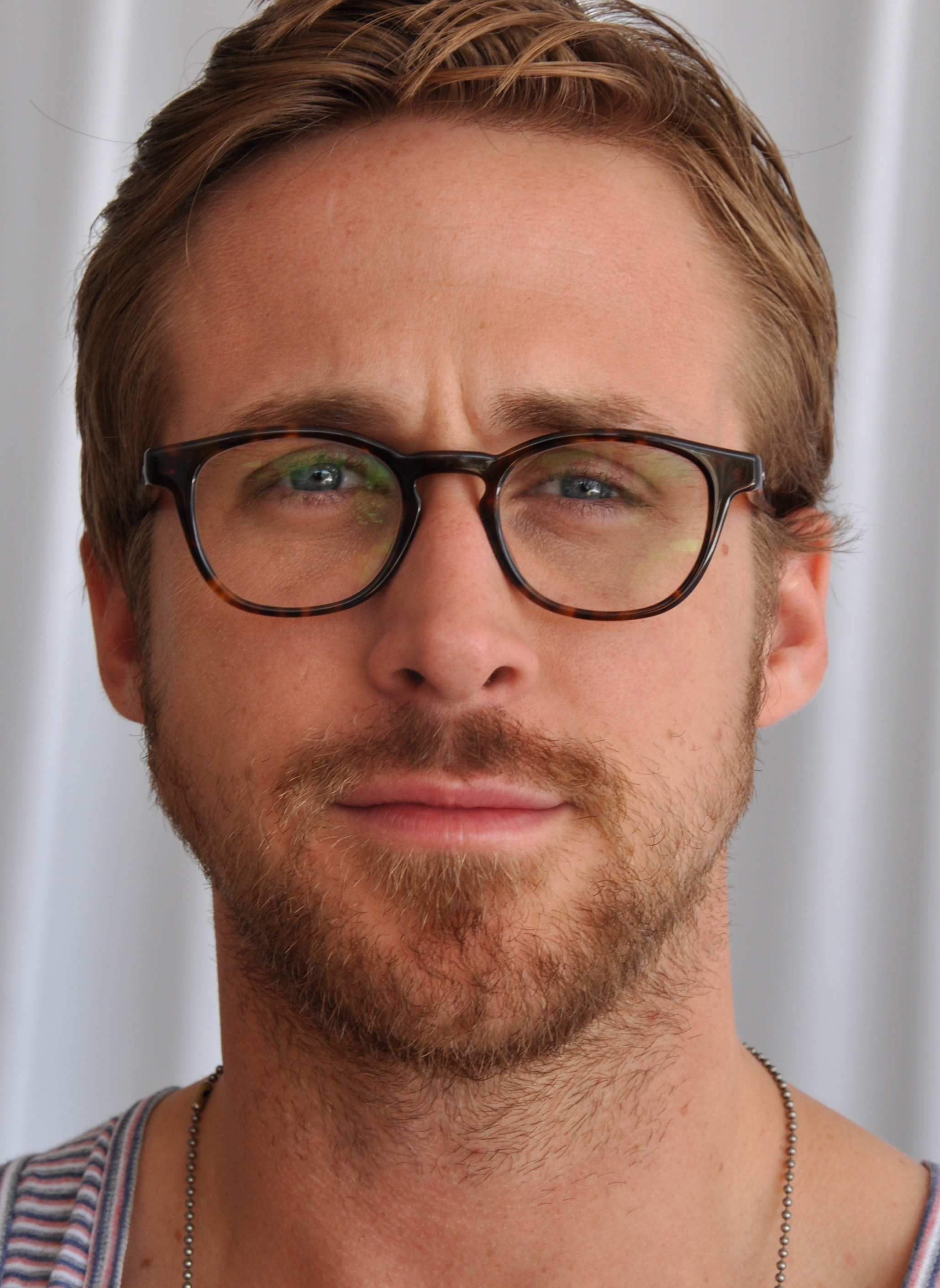
Gosling at Cannes in 2011

Ryan Gosling is a Canadian actor known for his work in a diverse range of characters from independent films to major studio features. As a child he showed an early interest in performing and joined a local ballet company at the age of 12. In 1993, he made his acting debut on the Disney Channel series The Mickey Mouse Club. After a supporting role in the football drama Remember the Titans, he secured a lead role as a young Jewish neo-Nazi in 2001's The Believer. Gosling gained mainstream attention in 2004 after starring opposite Rachel McAdams in the romantic drama film The Notebook. The film grossed over $115 million worldwide and established him as a leading man. In 2005, he appeared as a disturbed young art student in a psychological thriller film Stay. Gosling received critical acclaim and an nomination at the Academy Award for Best Actor for his portrayal of a drug-addicted high school teacher in the indie drama Half Nelson (2006) and played an introvert who falls for a sex doll in the 2007 film Lars and the Real Girl. For the latter he was nominated at a Golden Globe Award for Best Actor – Motion Picture Musical or Comedy.

In 2010, following a three-year absence from the screen, he starred opposite Michelle Williams in Derek Cianfrance's directorial debut, the marital drama Blue Valentine which earned him another nomination at the Golden Globe Award for Best Actor – Motion Picture Drama. His second on-screen appearance of 2010 was in the mystery film All Good Things, based on a true story where he starred as New York real-estate heir David Marks, who was investigated for the disappearance of his wife played by Kirsten Dunst. In 2011, Gosling expand his horizons by appearing in three diverse, high-profile roles. He co-starred in his first comedic role in the romantic comedy-drama Crazy, Stupid, Love, with Steve Carell and Emma Stone. Followed by his first action role as a Hollywood stunt performer who moonlights as a getaway driver, in Drive, based on a novel by James Sallis. The film was a box office success, grossing $81 million worldwide. In his final appearance of 2011, Gosling co-starred with Philip Seymour Hoffman in the political drama The Ides of March directed by George Clooney, in which he played an ambitious press secretary. He was nominated for a Golden Globe Award for Best Actor – Motion Picture Drama for the latter.

In 2013's crime thriller Gangster Squad, he portrayed Sgt. Jerry Wooters, a 1940s LAPD officer who attempts to outsmart mob boss Mickey Cohen (played by Sean Penn). In 2014, Gosling's directorial debut Lost River competed in the Un Certain Regard section at the 2014 Cannes Film Festival. Following a year later In 2015, he starred as a bond salesman in the ensemble financial satire The Big Short, a Best Picture nominee at the 2016 Academy Awards. The following year, Gosling starred in the black comedy The Nice Guys, opposite Russell Crowe, and in Damien Chazelle's musical romantic drama La La Land, where he was reunited with Emma Stone. He won the Golden Globe Award for Best Actor – Motion Picture Musical or Comedy and received his second Academy Award for Best Actor nomination. It emerged as one of his most commercially successful films, with earnings of over $440 million.

In 2017, he starred in Blade Runner 2049, a sequel to the 1982 science fiction film Blade Runner, directed by Denis Villeneuve and co-starring Harrison Ford, who reprised his role as Rick Deckard. Despite being Gosling's largest box office opening, grossing $31.5 million domestically, the film underperformed at the box office. In 2018, he had one release where he portrayed Neil Armstrong, the astronaut who became the first man to walk on the Moon in 1969, in Chazelle's biopic First Man, based on the book First Man: The Life of Neil A. Armstrong. After a four-year break from film, Gosling returned starring in the 2022 spy-action thriller The Gray Man, co-starred Chris Evans and Ana de Armas. In the following year, Gosling starred as Ken in Greta Gerwig's fantasy comedy Barbie, opposite Margot Robbie in the title role. For his performance he was nominated at the Golden Globe and Academy Award for Best Supporting Actor. Following a poorly received action comedy The Fall Guy alongside Emily Blunt. In 2026, Gosling starred as a middle school science teacher and former molecular biologist on a mission to save humanity in Project Hail Mary, based on Andy Weir's science fiction novel of the same name. He received acclaim for his performance and the film emerged as a commercial success, grossing $684.3 million worldwide.

== Films ==
Key
| † | Denotes films that have not yet been released |

| Year | Title | Role | Notes | Ref. |
|---|---|---|---|---|
| 1996 | Frankenstein and Me | Kenny | | |
| 2000 | Remember the Titans | Alan Bosley | | |
| 2001 | The Believer | Danny Balint | | |
| 2002 | Murder by Numbers | Richard Haywood | | |
| 2002 | The Slaughter Rule | Roy Chutney | | |
| 2003 | The United States of Leland | Leland P. Fitzgerald | | |
| 2004 | The Notebook | Noah Calhoun | | |
| 2005 | Stay | Henry Letham | | |
| 2006 | Half Nelson | Dan Dunne | | |
| 2007 | Fracture | Willy Beachum | | |
| 2007 | Lars and the Real Girl | Lars Lindstrom | | |
| 2010 | Blue Valentine | Dean Pereira | Also executive producer | |
| 2010 | All Good Things | David Marks | | |
| 2010 | ReGeneration | Narrator | Documentary, also producer | |
| 2011 | Crazy, Stupid, Love | Jacob Palmer | | |
| 2011 | Drive | The Driver | | |
| 2011 | The Ides of March | Stephen Meyers | | |
| 2012 | The Place Beyond the Pines | Luke Glanton | | |
| 2013 | Gangster Squad | Jerry Wooters | | |
| 2013 | Only God Forgives | Julian Thompson | Also executive producer | |
| 2013 | White Shadow | —N/a | Executive producer only | |
| 2014 | Lost River | —N/a | Director, writer and producer only | |
| 2014 | My Life Directed by Nicolas Winding Refn | Himself | Documentary | |
| 2015 | The Big Short | Jared Vennett | | |
| 2016 | The Nice Guys | P.I. Holland March | | |
| 2016 | La La Land | Sebastian Wilder | | |
| 2017 | Song to Song | BV | | |
| 2017 | Blade Runner 2049 | Officer K | | |
| 2018 | First Man | Neil Armstrong | | |
| 2022 | The Gray Man | Courtland Gentry "Sierra Six" | | |
| 2023 | Barbie | Ken | | |
| 2024 | The Fall Guy | Colt Seavers | Also producer | |
| 2025 | The Actor | —N/a | Executive producer only | |
| 2026 | Project Hail Mary | Dr. Ryland Grace | Also producer | |
| 2026 | Love of Your Life | —N/a | Producer only | |
| 2027 | Star Wars: Starfighter † | Kade Auberon | Post-production, also executive producer | |
| 2028 | Ghost Rider | Johnny Blaze | Pre-production | |

== Television ==
| Year(s) | Title | Role | Notes |
|---|---|---|---|
| 1993–1994 | The All-New Mickey Mouse Club | Various roles | Seasons 6–7 |
| 1995 | Are You Afraid of the Dark? | Jamie Leary | Episode: "The Tale of Station 109.1" |
| 1996 | PSI Factor: Chronicles of the Paranormal | Adam | Episode: "Dream House/UFO Encounter" |
| 1996 | Kung Fu: The Legend Continues | Kevin | Episode: "Dragon's Lair" |
| 1996 | Road to Avonlea | Bret McNulty | Episode: "From Away" |
| 1996 | Goosebumps | Greg Banks | Episode: "Say Cheese and Die" |
| 1996 | The Adventures of Shirley Holmes | Sean | Episode: "The Case of the Burning Building" |
| 1996 | Flash Forward | Scott Stuckey | 2 episodes |
| 1996 | Ready or Not | Matt Kalinsky | Episode: "I Do, I Don't" |
| 1997–1998 | Breaker High | Sean Hanlon | Main role (44 episodes) |
| 1998 | Nothing Too Good for a Cowboy | Tommy | Television film |
| 1998–1999 | Young Hercules | Hercules | Main role (50 episodes) |
| 1998 | Hercules: The Legendary Journeys | Zylus | Episode: "The Academy" |
| 1999 | The Unbelievables | Josh | Pilot |
| 2005 | I'm Still Here | Ilya Gerber (voice) | Television documentary |
| 2015, 2017, 2024, 2026 | Saturday Night Live | Himself (host) | 4 episodes |
| 2019 | My Favorite Shapes by Julio Torres | Blue Penguin (voice) | Television film |

== Discography ==
List of singles, with selected chart positions
| Title | Year | Peak chart positions | | | | | | | | | | Album |
| Title | Year | CAN | AUS | AUT | BEL (Fl) | FRA | SPA | SWI | UK | US | WW | Album |
|---|---|---|---|---|---|---|---|---|---|---|---|---|
| "Dead Man's Bones" (with Dead Man's Bones) | 2009 | — | — | — | — | — | — | — | — | — | — | Dead Man's Bones |
| "You Always Hurt the One You Love" | 2011 | — | — | — | — | — | — | — | — | — | — | Blue Valentine: Original Motion Picture Soundtrack |
| "A Lovely Night" (with Emma Stone) | 2016 | — | — | — | — | 75 | — | — | — | — | — | La La Land: Original Motion Picture Soundtrack |
| "City of Stars" (solo or with Emma Stone) | 2016 | 89 | — | 68 | 30 | 10 | 14 | 48 | 53 | — | — | La La Land: Original Motion Picture Soundtrack |
| "I'm Just Ken" | 2023 | 48 | 66 | 25 | — | — | — | — | 13 | 87 | 70 | Barbie the Album |
| "Push" | 2023 | — | — | — | — | — | — | — | — | — | — | Barbie the Album |
| "Lost In The Night" with Dead Man's Bones | 2026 | - | - | - | - | - | - | - | - | - | - | Lost In The Night |
"—" denotes a single that did not chart or was not released.

== See also ==
- List of awards and nominations received by Ryan Gosling
