= List of awards and nominations received by Ryan Gosling =

Ryan Gosling awards and nominations
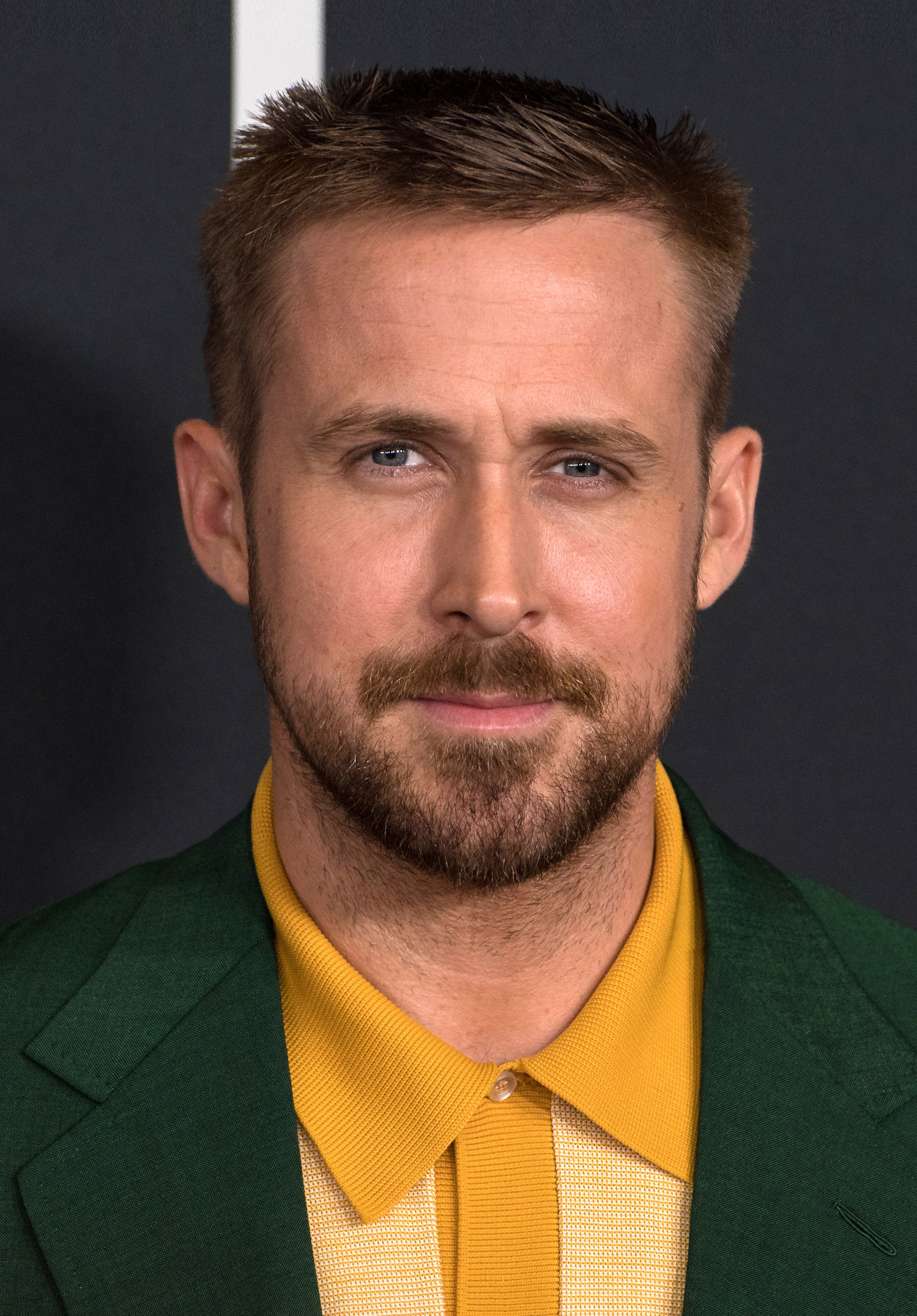
- Gosling at the premiere of First Man in 2018
Awards and nominations
Award	Wins	Nominations
Academy Awards	0	3
Actor Awards	0	6
BAFTA Awards	0	2
Emmy Awards	0	2
Golden Globe Awards	1	6

Totals (Note: Certain award groups do not simply award one winner. They acknowledge several different recipients, have runners-up, and have third place. Since this is a specific recognition and is different from losing an award, runner-up mentions are considered wins in this award tally. For simplification and to avoid errors, each award in this list has been presumed to have had a prior nomination.)
- Wins: 61
- Nominations: 208

Ryan Gosling is a Canadian actor and musician. His accolades including a Golden Globe Award, a People's Choice Award, five Teen Choice Awards as well as nominations for three Oscars known as Academy Awards, two BAFTA Awards, nine Critics' Choice Awards, a Primetime Emmy Award, and six Actor Awards.

Gosling’s breakthrough role came in 2004 with a leading role in the romantic drama The Notebook, for which he won four Teen Choice Awards and an MTV Movie Award. His performance as a drug-addicted teacher in the drama Half Nelson (2006) won him an Independent Spirit Award, and he was nominated for the Academy Award, Critics' Choice Movie Award, and Actor Award all for Best Actor in a Leading Role. At age 26, he was the seventh-youngest Best Actor nominee at the time. Gosling's performance as a socially inept loner in the dramedy Lars and the Real Girl (2007) earned him nominations for a Critics' Choice Movie Award, Golden Globe Award and Actor Award.

After a three-year acting hiatus, Gosling played a frazzled husband in the romantic drama Blue Valentine (2010) earning him nominations for the Critics' Choice Movie Award and the Golden Globe Award for Best Actor. 2011 proved to be a landmark year for the actor as he appeared in three mainstream films. He played a romantic leading man in the romantic comedy Crazy, Stupid, Love earning a nomination for the Golden Globe Award for Best Actor in a Motion Picture – Musical or Comedy, a mysterious getaway driver in the neo-noir crime thriller Drive earning nominations for a Critics' Choice Movie Award for Best Actor and an Independent Spirit Award for Best Male Lead and a junior campaign manager in the political drama The Ides of March receiving a nomination for the Golden Globe Award for Best Actor in a Motion Picture – Drama.

Gosling earned acclaim starring as a struggling jazz pianist in the Damien Chazelle directed musical comedy-drama La La Land (2016) His performance earned him a Golden Globe Award for Best Actor – Motion Picture Musical or Comedy, and nominations for an Academy Award, BAFTA Award, Critics' Choice Movie Award, and Actor Award for Best Actor. For his performances as private eye Holland March in the neo-noir buddy comedy The Nice Guys (2016) and Neil Armstrong in the historical space drama First Man (2018) he earned Critics' Choice Movie Award nominations.

In 2023, Gosling played Ken in Greta Gerwig's Barbie, which emerged as his biggest box office success, and earned him nominations for the AACTA, Academy, BAFTA, Critics' Choice, Golden Globe and Actor Award for Best Supporting Actor, winning the former. He also garnered ensemble cast nominations at both the Critics' Choice and Actor Awards. His hosting of a 2024 episode of Saturday Night Live earned him a nomination for the Primetime Emmy Award for Outstanding Guest Actor in a Comedy Series in 2024.

== Major associations ==
Key
Year	Denotes the year of U.S. release

=== Academy Awards ===
Year	Category	Nominated work	Result	Ref.
2006	Best Actor	Half Nelson	Nominated	
2016	Best Actor	La La Land	Nominated	
2023	Best Supporting Actor	Barbie	Nominated	

=== Actor Awards ===
Year	Category	Nominated work	Result	Ref.
2006	Outstanding Male Actor in a Leading Role	Half Nelson	Nominated	
2007	Outstanding Male Actor in a Leading Role	Lars and the Real Girl	Nominated	
2015	Outstanding Cast in a Motion Picture	The Big Short	Nominated	
2016	Outstanding Male Actor in a Leading Role	La La Land	Nominated	
2023	Outstanding Male Actor in a Supporting Role	Barbie	Nominated	
2023	Outstanding Cast in a Motion Picture	Barbie	Nominated	

=== BAFTA Awards ===
Year	Category	Nominated work	Result	Ref.
British Academy Film Awards
2016	Best Actor in a Leading Role	La La Land	Nominated	
2023	Best Actor in a Supporting Role	Barbie	Nominated	

=== Critics' Choice Awards ===
Year	Category	Nominated work	Result	Ref.
Critics' Choice Movie Awards
2006	Best Actor	Half Nelson	Nominated	
2007	Best Actor	Lars and the Real Girl	Nominated	
2010	Best Actor	Blue Valentine	Nominated	
2011	Best Actor	Drive	Nominated	
2011	Best Cast	The Ides of March	Nominated	
2016	Best Actor in a Comedy	The Nice Guys	Nominated	
2016	Best Actor	La La Land	Nominated	
2018	Best Actor	First Man	Nominated	
2023	Best Supporting Actor	Barbie	Nominated	

=== Emmy Awards ===
Year	Category	Nominated work	Result	Ref.
Primetime Emmy Awards
2024	Outstanding Guest Actor in a Comedy Series	Saturday Night Live (episode: "Ryan Gosling/Chris Stapleton")	Nominated	

=== Golden Globe Awards ===
Year	Category	Nominated work	Result	Ref.
2007	Best Actor in a Motion Picture – Musical or Comedy	Lars and the Real Girl	Nominated	
2010	Best Actor in a Motion Picture – Drama	Blue Valentine	Nominated	
2011	Best Actor in a Motion Picture – Drama	The Ides of March	Nominated	
2011	Best Actor in a Motion Picture – Musical or Comedy	Crazy, Stupid, Love	Nominated	
2016	Best Actor in a Motion Picture – Musical or Comedy	La La Land	Won	
2023	Best Supporting Actor – Motion Picture	Barbie	Nominated	

== Other awards and nominations ==
Key
Year	Denotes the year of release.

Organizations	Year	Category	Work	Result	Ref.
Australian Academy of Cinema and Television Arts Awards	2011	Best Lead Actor	The Ides of March	Nominated	
Australian Academy of Cinema and Television Arts Awards	2016	Best Lead Actor	La La Land	Nominated	
Australian Academy of Cinema and Television Arts Awards	2023	Best Supporting Actor	Barbie	Won	
Capri Hollywood International Film Festival	2023	Best Supporting Actor	Barbie	Won	
Independent Spirit Awards	2001	Best Male Lead	The Believer	Nominated	
Independent Spirit Awards	2006	Best Male Lead	Half Nelson	Won	
Independent Spirit Awards	2011	Best Male Lead	Drive	Nominated	
Irish Film & Television Awards	2011	Best International Actor	Drive	Won	
Irish Film & Television Awards	2016	Best International Actor	La La Land	Nominated	
Irish Film & Television Awards	2023	Best International Actor	Barbie	Nominated	
MTV Movie & TV Awards	2004	Best Kiss – Movie (shared with Rachel McAdams)	The Notebook	Won	
MTV Movie & TV Awards	2011	Best Gut-Wrenching Performance – Movie	Drive	Nominated	
MTV Movie & TV Awards	2011	Best Kiss – Movie (shared with Emma Stone)	Crazy, Stupid, Love	Nominated	
MTV Movie & TV Awards	2011	Best Performance – Movie	Drive	Nominated	
MTV Movie & TV Awards	2016	Best Kiss – Movie (shared with Emma Stone)	La La Land	Nominated	
MTV Movie & TV Awards	2016	Best Musical Moment (for "City of Stars") (shared with Emma Stone)	La La Land	Nominated	
National Board of Review Awards	2006	Best Breakthrough Performance	Half Nelson	Won	
National Board of Review Awards	2015	Best Cast	The Big Short	Won	
People's Choice Awards	2014	Favorite Dramatic Movie Actor	Gangster Squad	Nominated	
People's Choice Awards	2016	Favorite Comedic Movie Actor	The Nice Guys	Nominated	
People's Choice Awards	2024	The Male Movie Star of the Year	Barbie	Won	
People's Choice Awards	2024	The Comedy Movie Star of the Year	Barbie	Nominated	
Satellite Awards	2006	Best Actor in a Motion Picture – Drama	Half Nelson	Nominated	
Satellite Awards	2007	Best Actor in a Motion Picture – Comedy or Musical	Lars and the Real Girl	Won	
Satellite Awards	2010	Best Actor in a Motion Picture – Drama	Blue Valentine	Nominated	
Satellite Awards	2011	Best Actor in a Motion Picture – Drama	Drive	Won	
Satellite Awards	2013	Best Supporting Actor in a Motion Picture	The Place Beyond the Pines	Nominated	
Satellite Awards	2016	Best Actor in a Motion Picture – Comedy or Musical	La La Land	Nominated	
Satellite Awards	2018	Best Actor in a Motion Picture – Drama	First Man	Nominated	
Satellite Awards	2023	Best Supporting Actor in a Motion Picture	Barbie	Nominated	
Saturn Awards	2018	Best Performance by an Actor in a Film	Blade Runner 2049	Nominated	
Saturn Awards	2024	Best Performance by a Supporting Actor in a Film	Barbie	Nominated	
Santa Barbara International Film Festival	2007	Independent Award	Lars and the Real Girl	Won	
Santa Barbara International Film Festival	2017	Outstanding Performer(s) of the Year Award	La La Land	Won	
Santa Barbara International Film Festival	2024	Kirk Douglas Award	—N/a	Won	
Seattle International Film Festival	2006	Best Actor	Half Nelson	Won	
ShoWest Awards	2004	Male Star of Tomorrow	The Notebook	Won	
Stockholm International Film Festival	2006	Best Actor	Half Nelson	Won	
Teen Choice Awards	2004	Choice Movie: Breakout Male	The Notebook	Won	
Teen Choice Awards	2004	Choice Movie: Chemistry (shared with Rachel McAdams)	The Notebook	Won	
Teen Choice Awards	2004	Choice Movie: Dance Scene (shared with Rachel McAdams)	The Notebook	Nominated	
Teen Choice Awards	2004	Choice Movie Actor: Drama	The Notebook	Won	
Teen Choice Awards	2004	Choice Movie: Liplock (shared with Rachel McAdams)	The Notebook	Won	
Teen Choice Awards	2004	Choice Movie: Love Scene (shared with Rachel McAdams)	The Notebook	Won	
Teen Choice Awards	2006	Choice Movie Actor: Thriller	Fracture	Nominated	
Teen Choice Awards	2011	Choice Movie Actor: Drama	Drive	Nominated	
Teen Choice Awards	2011	Choice Movie Actor: Comedy	Crazy, Stupid, Love	Nominated	
Teen Choice Awards	2011	Choice Movie: Chemistry (shared with Steve Carell)	Crazy, Stupid, Love	Nominated	
Teen Choice Awards	2011	Choice Movie: Liplock (shared with Emma Stone)	Crazy, Stupid, Love	Nominated	
Teen Choice Awards	2011	Choice Male Hottie	Himself	Nominated	
Teen Choice Awards	2013	Choice Male Hottie	Himself	Nominated	
Teen Choice Awards	2017	Choice Movie Actor: Sci-Fi	Blade Runner 2049	Nominated	
Village Voice Film Poll	2006	Best Actor	Half Nelson	Won	

== Critics associations ==
Year	Association	Category	Nominated work	Result	Ref.
2001	Russian Guild of Film Critics	Best Foreign Actor	The Believer	Won	
2002	Chicago Film Critics Association	Most Promising Performer	The Believer and Murder by Numbers	Nominated	
2006	Chicago Film Critics Association	Best Actor	Half Nelson	Nominated	
2006	Dallas–Fort Worth Film Critics Association	Best Actor	Half Nelson	Nominated	
2006	National Society of Film Critics	Best Actor	Half Nelson	Nominated	
2006	New York Film Critics Circle	Best Actor	Half Nelson	Nominated	
2006	Online Film Critics Society	Best Actor	Half Nelson	Nominated	
2006	St. Louis Film Critics Association	Best Actor	Half Nelson	Nominated	
2006	Toronto Film Critics Association	Best Actor	Half Nelson	Nominated	
2006	Vancouver Film Critics Circle	Best Actor	Half Nelson	Nominated	
2007	Chicago Film Critics Association	Best Actor	Lars and the Real Girl	Nominated	
2007	St. Louis Film Critics Association	Best Actor	Lars and the Real Girl	Nominated	
2010	Chicago Film Critics Association	Best Actor	Blue Valentine	Nominated	
2010	Critics' Choice Movie Awards	Best Actor	Blue Valentine	Nominated	
2010	Detroit Film Critics Society	Best Actor	Blue Valentine	Nominated	
2010	London Film Critics' Circle	Actor of the Year	Blue Valentine	Nominated	
2010	Online Film Critics Society	Best Actor	Blue Valentine	Nominated	
2011	Denver Film Critics Society	Best Supporting Actor	Crazy, Stupid, Love	Nominated	
2011	Detroit Film Critics Society	Best Supporting Actor	Crazy, Stupid, Love	Nominated	
2011	Dublin Film Critics' Circle	Best Actor	Drive	Nominated	
2011	London Film Critics' Circle	Actor of the Year	Drive	Nominated	
2011	St. Louis Film Critics Association	Best Actor	Drive	Nominated	
2011	Women Film Critics Circle	Best Actor	Drive	Nominated	
2011	Women Film Critics Circle	Best Actor	The Ides of March	Nominated	
2016	Alliance of Women Film Journalists	Best Actor	La La Land	Nominated	
2016	Austin Film Critics Association	Best Actor	La La Land	Nominated	
2016	Dallas–Fort Worth Film Critics Association	Best Actor	La La Land	Nominated	
2016	Detroit Film Critics Society	Best Actor	La La Land	Nominated	
2016	Florida Film Critics Circle	Best Actor	La La Land	Nominated	
2016	Houston Film Critics Society	Best Actor	La La Land	Nominated	
2016	Online Film Critics Society	Best Actor	La La Land	Nominated	
2016	San Diego Film Critics Society	Best Actor	La La Land	Nominated	
2016	San Diego Film Critics Society	Best Comedic Performance	The Nice Guys	Won	
2016	San Francisco Film Critics Circle	Best Actor	La La Land	Nominated	
2016	St. Louis Film Critics Association	Best Actor	La La Land	Nominated	
2016	Vancouver Film Critics Circle	Best Actor	La La Land	Nominated	
2016	Washington D.C. Area Film Critics Association	Best Actor	La La Land	Nominated	
2023	Alliance of Women Film Journalists	Best Actor in a Supporting Role	Barbie	Won	
2023	Astra Film Awards	Best Supporting Actor	Barbie	Won	
2023	Atlanta Film Critics Circle	Best Supporting Actor	Barbie	Won (Note: Tied with Robert Downey Jr. for Oppenheimer.)	
2023	Austin Film Critics Association	Best Supporting Actor	Barbie	Nominated	
2023	Boston Society of Film Critics	Best Supporting Actor	Barbie	Won	
2023	Chicago Film Critics Association	Best Supporting Actor	Barbie	Nominated	
2023	Chicago Indie Critics	Best Supporting Actor	Barbie	Nominated	
2023	Critics Association of Central Florida	Best Supporting Actor	Barbie	Runner-up	
2023	Columbus Film Critics Association	Best Supporting Performance	Barbie	Nominated	
2023	Denver Film Critics Society	Best Supporting Actor	Barbie	Won	
2023	DiscussingFilm Critic Awards	Best Supporting Actor	Barbie	Runner-up	
2023	Dublin Film Critics Circle	Best Actor	Barbie	Nominated	
2023	Family Film Awards	Outstanding Actor in a Feature Film	Barbie	Nominated	
2023	Georgia Film Critics Association	Best Supporting Actor	Barbie	Nominated	
2023	Greater Western New York Film Critics Association	Best Supporting Actor	Barbie	Nominated	
2023	Gotham Awards	Outstanding Supporting Performance	Barbie	Nominated	
2023	Hawaii Film Critics Society	Best Supporting Actor	Barbie	Won	
2023	Hollywood Music In Media Awards	Song – Onscreen Performance (for "I'm Just Ken")	Barbie	Nominated	
2023	Houston Film Critics Society	Best Supporting Actor	Barbie	Won	
2023	Indiana Film Journalists Association	Best Supporting Performance	Barbie	Nominated	
2023	Iowa Film Critics Association	Best Supporting Actor	Barbie	Runner-up	
2023	Kansas City Film Critics Circle	Best Supporting Actor	Barbie	Runner-up	
2023	Las Vegas Film Critics Society	Best Supporting Actor	Barbie	Nominated	
2023	Latino Entertainment Journalists Association	Best Supporting Actor	Barbie	Nominated	
2023	London Critics Circle Film Awards	Supporting Actor of the Year	Barbie	Nominated	
2023	Los Angeles Film Critics Association	Best Supporting Actor	Barbie	Runner-up	
2023	Michigan Movie Critics Guild	Best Supporting Actor	Barbie	Won	
2023	Minnesota Film Critics Alliance	Best Supporting Actor	Barbie	Nominated	
2023	Music City Film Critics Association	Best Supporting Actor	Barbie	Nominated	
2023	National Society of Film Critics	Best Supporting Actor	Barbie	Runner-up	
2023	New York Film Critics Circle	Best Supporting Actor	Barbie	Nominated	
2023	North Carolina Film Critics Association	Best Supporting Actor	Barbie	Nominated	
2023	North Dakota Film Society	Best Supporting Actor	Barbie	Nominated	
2023	North Texas Film Critics Association	Best Supporting Actor	Barbie	Nominated	
2023	Oklahoma Film Critics Circle	Best Supporting Actor	Barbie	Won	
2023	Online Association of Female Film Critics	Best Supporting Male	Barbie	Nominated	
2023	Online Film and Television Association	Best Supporting Actor	Barbie	Runner-up	
2023	Online Film Critics Society	Best Supporting Actor	Barbie	Nominated	
2023	Phoenix Critics Circle	Best Supporting Actor	Barbie	Nominated	
2023	Phoenix Film Critics Society	Best Actor in a Supporting Role	Barbie	Won	
2023	Portland Critics Association	Best Supporting Actor	Barbie	Won	
2023	San Diego Film Critics Society	Best Supporting Actor	Barbie	Runner-up	
2023	San Diego Film Critics Society	Best Comedic Performance	Barbie	Nominated	
2023	San Francisco Bay Area Film Critics Circle	Best Supporting Actor	Barbie	Nominated	
2023	Seattle Film Critics Society	Best Supporting Actor	Barbie	Nominated	
2023	St. Louis Film Critics Association	Best Supporting Actor	Barbie	Won	
2023	Toronto Film Critics Association	Outstanding Supporting Performance	Barbie	Won	
2023	UK Film Critics Association	Best Supporting Actor	Barbie	Won	
2023	Utah Film Critics Association	Best Supporting Performance, Male	Barbie	Nominated	
2023	Washington D.C. Area Film Critics Association	Best Supporting Actor	Barbie	Nominated	
2024	Astra Film Awards	Best Picture	The Fall Guy	Runner-up	
2024	Astra Film Awards	Best Actor	The Fall Guy	Runner-up	
2025	Astra Midseason Movie Awards	Best Actor	Project Hail Mary	Runner-up	

== See also ==
- Ryan Gosling filmography
