= Shareeka Epps =

American actress

- Born: July 11, 1989 (age 36); Brooklyn, New York, U.S.
- Occupation: Actress
- Years active: 2004–present

Shareeka Epps (born July 11, 1989) is an American actress. She is best known for starring in the 2006 film Half Nelson, alongside Ryan Gosling. She won the Independent Spirit Award for Best Female Lead for her performance in the film.

== Life and career ==
After being discovered in junior high school, Epps starred in the low budget, short film Gowanus, Brooklyn alongside Matt Kerr, playing the role of "Drey", a high school student. The short film won the Short Filmmaking Award at "Sundance Film Festival" in 2004.

The success of Gowanus, Brooklyn led to a full-length feature film, Half Nelson. Released August 11, 2006 the story concerns an inner city middle-school teacher who forms a friendship with one of his students after she discovers that he has a drug habit. Epps reprised her role as "Drey" and the role of the teacher was replaced by Ryan Gosling. The film also starred rising star Anthony Mackie.

For Half Nelson, Epps won the Gotham Independent Film Award for Breakthrough Actor (2006); was named Best Supporting Actress by the Boston Society of Film Critics Awards (2006); won the WFCC Award for Female Rights To Male Roles in Movies at the Women Film Critics Circle Awards (2006); and Best Female lead by the Independent Spirit Awards (2007). Epps also received nominations from the Broadcast Film Critics Association; Alliance of Women Film Journalists; Broadcast Film Critics Association Awards; Chicago Film Critics Association Awards;, Online Film Critics Society Awards; St. Louis Film Critics Association, US and two Black Reel Awards nominations.

Epps graduated in 2007 from Binghamton High School in upstate New York, and attended SUNY Broome Community College, where she earned her associates' degree.

In 2007, Epps acted in Aliens vs. Predator: Requiem as Kendra although her portrayal of Kendra was almost entirely omitted from the theatrical as well as the home video release. She has one scene left in the final cut, as an extra at the Gunnison Diner along with her onscreen brother Meshach Peters.

Epps made her first TV appearance in an episode of Law & Order: Special Victims Unit airing on April 15, 2008, titled "Undercover" as Ashley Tyler. In 2013 she starred in American Milkshake alongside Tyler Ross and Georgia Ford.

In 2009, Shareeka provided spoken word vocals on the songs "Intro" and "Werewolf Heart" from Dead Man's Bones eponymous debut album. Ryan Gosling, who co-starred in Half Nelson, is one of the two members of Dead Man's Bones.

Epps currently resides in New York.

== Filmography ==
=== Film ===
Year	Title	Role	Notes
2004	Gowanus, Brooklyn	Drey	Short
2006	Half Nelson	Drey	
2007	Neal Cassady	Annie Gibson	
2007	Aliens vs. Predator: Requiem	Kendra	Uncredited
2009	The Winning Season	Lisa Robinson	
2010	My Soul to Take	Chandele Brown	
2010	Mother and Child	Ray Lawrence	
2011	Yelling to the Sky	Fatima Harris	
2013	American Milkshake	Henrietta	

=== Television ===
Year	Title	Role	Notes
2008	Law & Order: Special Victims Unit	Ashley Tyler	Episode: "Undercover"
2020	The Fugitive	Ronnie Lawson	2 episodes

== Awards and nominations ==
- Black Reel Awards
  - 2007, Best Supporting Actress: Half Nelson (Nominated)
  - 2007, Best Breakthrough Performance: Half Nelson (Nominated)
- Boston Society of Film Critics
  - 2007, Best Supporting Actress: Half Nelson (Winner)
- Broadcast Film Critics Association Awards
  - 2007, Best Young Actress: Half Nelson (Nominated)
- Chicago Film Critics
  - 2007, Most Promising Newcomer: Half Nelson (Nominated)
- Independent Spirit Awards
  - 2006, Best Female Lead: Half Nelson (Winner)
- Online Film Critics Society
  - 2007, Best Breakthrough Performance: Half Nelson (Nominated)
- St. Louis Gateway Film Critics Association
  - 2007, Best Supporting Actress: Half Nelson (Nominated)
