= Half Nelson =

Half Nelson may refer to:

- Half nelson, a wrestling hold
- Half Nelson (album), a 1985 album by Willie Nelson
- Half Nelson (TV series), a 1985 TV series starring Joe Pesci
- Halfnelson (band), an American rock band, later renamed Sparks
  - Halfnelson (album), a 1971 album by the band
- Half Nelson (film), a 2006 film starring Ryan Gosling and Shareeka Epps
- "Half Nelson", a composition by Miles Davis from Savoy 951
- Half Nelson, a 1998 album by Groop Dogdrill
- Half Nelson, a 1992 short film directed by John Fawcett
- "Half Nelson" (The Incredible Hulk), a 1981 television episode
