= Ryan Gosling =

Canadian actor (born 1980)

- Gosling in 2023
- Born: Ryan Thomas Gosling; November 12, 1980 (age 46); London, Ontario, Canada
- Occupations: Actor; musician
- Years active: 1992–present
- Works: Full list
- Partner: Eva Mendes (2011–present)
- Children: 2
- Awards: Full list

Ryan Thomas Gosling (/ˈɡɒslɪŋ/ GOSS-ling; born November 12, 1980) is a Canadian actor, singer, and musician. Known for his work in both independent films and major studio features, his films as a leading actor have grossed over US$4 billion worldwide. He has received various accolades including a Golden Globe Award, in addition to nominations for three Academy Awards, nine Critics' Choice Awards, two British Academy Film Awards and a Primetime Emmy Award.

He began his acting career at a young age, starring in Disney Channel's The All New Mickey Mouse Club (1993–1995) and teen dramas such as Breaker High (1997–1998) and Young Hercules (1998–1999). He transitioned to film with his feature length debut in Frankenstein and Me (1996) and a supporting role in the sports drama Remember the Titans (2000). He received praise for his performance in The Believer (2001), before emerging as a leading man with his role in the romantic drama The Notebook (2004). Further praise came with the psychological thriller Fracture and the comedy-drama Lars and the Real Girl (both 2007).

Gosling earned Academy Award nominations for his performances in the independent drama Half Nelson (2006), the romantic musical La La Land (2016) and the fantasy comedy Barbie (2023), the latter becoming his highest-grossing release. He also starred in acclaimed films including the romantic drama Blue Valentine (2010), the comedy Crazy, Stupid, Love (2011), the political drama The Ides of March (2011), the action drama Drive (2011), the biographical comedy dramas The Big Short (2015) and First Man (2018), the action comedy The Nice Guys (2016), and the science fiction films Blade Runner 2049 (2017) and Project Hail Mary (2026). Gosling made his directorial debut with the fantasy film Lost River in 2014.

Off-screen, he is a prominent supporter of several charities. Gosling's band Dead Man's Bones released their self-titled debut album and toured North America in 2009. He is a co-owner of Tagine, a Moroccan restaurant in Beverly Hills, California. Gosling is in a relationship with his longtime co-star, actress Eva Mendes.

== Early life ==
Ryan Thomas Gosling was born on November 12, 1980, at St. Joseph's Hospital in London, Ontario, to Thomas Ray Gosling, a travelling salesman for a paper mill, and Donna Wilson, a secretary. Both of his parents are of part French Canadian descent, along with some German, English, Scottish, and Irish. He and his family were members of the Church of Jesus Christ of Latter-day Saints, and Gosling has said that the religion influenced every aspect of their lives. Because of his father's work, they "moved around a lot". Gosling lived in Cornwall, Ontario, and Burlington, Ontario. His parents divorced when he was 13, and he and his older sister Mandi lived with their mother, an experience Gosling has credited with programming him "to think like a girl".

Gosling was educated at Gladstone Public School, Cornwall Collegiate and Vocational School and Lester B. Pearson High School. As a child, he watched Dick Tracy and was inspired to become an actor. He "hated" being a child, was bullied in elementary school, and had no friends until he was "14 or 15". In school he picked fights to impress girls. In grade one, having been influenced by the action film First Blood, he took steak knives to school and threw them at other children during recess. This incident led to a suspension. He was unable to read at age 10 and was homeschooled thereafter. His mother left her job and home-schooled him for a year. He has said homeschooling gave him "a sense of autonomy that I've never really lost".

Gosling performed in front of audiences from an early age, encouraged by his sister being a performer. He and his sister sang together at weddings; he performed with Elvis Perry, his uncle's Elvis Presley tribute act, and was involved with a local ballet company. Performing boosted his self-confidence as it was the only thing for which he received praise. He developed an idiosyncratic accent because, as a child, he thought having a Canadian accent did not sound "tough." He began to model his accent on that of Marlon Brando. Gosling dropped out of high school at age 17 to focus on his acting career.

== Acting career ==
=== 1990s: Early television roles ===
After twelve-year-old Gosling successfully auditioned for a revival of The All New Mickey Mouse Club, he was given a two-year contract as a Mouseketeer and subsequently moved to Orlando, Florida to film the show. He has said he appeared on-screen infrequently because other children were considered more talented. Nonetheless, he has described the job as the greatest two years of his life. Fellow cast members on the show included Britney Spears, Christina Aguilera, Justin Timberlake, Keri Russell, and JC Chasez. Gosling has credited the experience with instilling in him "this great sense of focus."

Gosling starred in the series from 1993 until it ended in 1995, after which he returned to Canada. He continued to appear in family entertainment television series, including Are You Afraid of the Dark? (1995) and Goosebumps (1996), and starred in Breaker High (1997–98) as Sean Hanlon. When he was 18, he moved to New Zealand to film the Fox Kids adventure series Young Hercules (1998–1999) as the title character. He initially enjoyed working on the series, but began to care too much about the show, making it too difficult to enjoy. He wanted to spend more time sitting with and devising a character as well as play a variety of roles, so he chose to transition into film and not accept any more television work.

=== 2000–2003: Independent films ===
Aged 19, Gosling decided to move into "serious acting". He was dropped by his agent and initially found it difficult to secure work because of the "stigma" attached to children's television. After a supporting role in the football drama Remember the Titans, he secured a lead role as a young Jewish neo-Nazi in 2001's The Believer. Director Henry Bean said he cast Gosling because his Mormon upbringing helped him understand the isolation of Judaism. Kevin Thomas of the Los Angeles Times praised an "electrifying and terrifyingly convincing" performance while Todd McCarthy of Variety felt his "dynamite performance" could "scarcely have been better". The film won the Grand Jury Prize at the Sundance Film Festival and Gosling has described it as "the film that kind of gift-wrapped for me the career that I have now." Because of the controversial nature of the film, it was difficult to secure financial backing for a full theatrical release, and the film was instead broadcast on Showtime. The film was a commercial failure, grossing $416,925 worldwide from a production budget of $1.5 million.

In 2002, Gosling co-starred in the psychological thriller Murder by Numbers, where Gosling portrayed one of a pair of high school seniors who believe they can commit the perfect murder. Lisa Schwarzbaum of Entertainment Weekly described him as "a phenomenal talent even in junk like this" while Todd McCarthy felt that the "strong and "charismatic" young actors were "let down by the screenplay". The film was a minor commercial success, grossing $56 million worldwide from a production budget of $50 million. His second screen appearance of 2002 was in The Slaughter Rule which explores the relationship between a high school football player and his troubled coach, played by David Morse. Gosling has said that the opportunity to work with Morse made him "a better actor". Stephen Holden of The New York Times described Gosling as "major star material" with a "rawness and an intensity that recall the young Matt Dillon" while Manohla Dargis of the Los Angeles Times was won over by his "raw talent". The film was released in just three US theatres and grossed $13,411.

In 2003, Gosling starred in The United States of Leland as a teenager imprisoned for the murder of a disabled boy. He was drawn to the role because it was unusual to find a character that was "emotionally disconnected for the whole film." Critic Roger Ebert felt that the "gifted actor does everything that can be done with Leland, but the character comes from a writer's conceits, not from life." A. O. Scott of The New York Times noted that he "struggles to rescue Leland from the clutches of cliché" while David Rooney of Variety felt that his "one-note, blankly disturbed act has none of the magnetic edge of his breakthrough work in The Believer". The film grossed $343,847 in the United States and was not released overseas.

=== 2004–2009: The Notebook and Half Nelson ===
Gosling gained mainstream attention in 2004 after starring opposite Rachel McAdams in the romantic drama film The Notebook, a film adaptation of Nicholas Sparks' novel of the same name, directed by Nick Cassavetes. Gosling played Noah Calhoun and commented on the role: "It gave me an opportunity to play a character over a period of time – from 1940 to 1946 – that was quite profound and formative." He sought to imbue his character with "quiet strength" and was inspired by Sam Shepard's performance in Days of Heaven. Shepard co-starred in The Notebook. Filming took place in Charleston, South Carolina, in late 2002 and early 2003. Although Gosling and McAdams became romantically involved in 2005, they had a combative relationship on the set. "We inspired the worst in each other," Gosling has said. "It was a strange experience, making a love story and not getting along with your co-star in any way." At one point, Gosling asked Cassavetes to "bring somebody else in for my off-camera shot" because he felt McAdams was uncooperative. The New York Times praised the "spontaneous and combustible" performances of the two leads and noted that, "against your better judgment, you root for the pair to beat the odds against them." Desson Thomson of The Washington Post praised Gosling's "beguiling unaffectedness" and noted that "it's hard not to like these two or begrudge them a great love together". The film grossed over $115 million worldwide. Gosling won four Teen Choice Awards and an MTV Movie Award. Entertainment Weekly has said that the movie contains the All-Time Best Movie Kiss while the Los Angeles Times has included a scene from the film in a list of the 50 Classic Movie Kisses. The Notebook has appeared on many Most Romantic Movies lists.

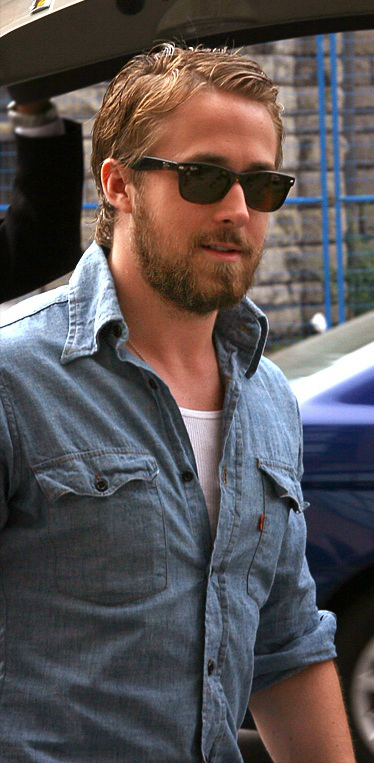
Gosling at the 2007 Toronto International Film Festival

In 2005, Gosling appeared as a disturbed young art student in Stay, a psychological thriller film co-starring Naomi Watts and Ewan McGregor. In an uncomplimentary review of the film, Manohla Dargis of The New York Times stated that Gosling, "like his fans, deserves better." Todd McCarthy remarked that the "capable" Gosling and McGregor "deliver nothing new from what they've shown before". The film grossed $8 million worldwide. Gosling was unfazed by the negative reaction: "I had a kid come up to me on the street, 10 years old, and he says, 'Are you that guy from Stay? What the f--- was that movie about?' I think that's great. I'm just as proud if someone says, 'Hey, you made me sick in that movie,' as if they say I made them cry."

Gosling next starred in 2006's Half Nelson as a drug-addicted junior high school teacher who forms a bond with a young student. To prepare for the role, Gosling moved to New York for one month before shooting began. He lived in a small apartment in Brooklyn and spent time shadowing an eighth grade teacher. Kenneth Turan of the Los Angeles Times described it as "a mesmerizing performance ... that shows the kind of deep understanding of character few actors manage." Ruthe Stein of the San Francisco Chronicle drew comparisons with Marlon Brando and asserted that "nobody who cares about great acting will want to miss his performance". Roger Ebert believed that his performance "proves he's one of the finest actors working in contemporary movies." Gosling garnered a nomination for the Academy Award for Best Actor. The film grossed $4 million at the worldwide box office. In 2007, he was invited to join the Academy of Motion Picture Arts and Sciences.

Gosling played an introvert who falls for a sex doll in the 2007 film Lars and the Real Girl. He drew inspiration from James Stewart's performance in Harvey. Roger Ebert felt "a film about a life-sized love doll" had been turned into "a life-affirming statement of hope" because of "a performance by Ryan Gosling that says things that cannot be said". Ann Hornaday of The Washington Post described his performance as "a small miracle ... because he changes and grows so imperceptibly before our eyes." However, Manohla Dargis of The New York Times felt "the performance is a rare miscalculation in a mostly brilliant career." He was nominated for a Golden Globe Award for Best Actor – Motion Picture Musical or Comedy and a Screen Actors Guild Award for Outstanding Performance by a Male Actor in a Leading Role. The film was a box office failure, failing to recoup its $12 million production budget.

Gosling starred opposite Anthony Hopkins in the 2007 courtroom thriller Fracture. He originally turned down the role, but changed his mind when Hopkins signed on. Gosling noted that he was drawn to his character, Willie, because he had flaws and seemed like a real person. He spent time shadowing lawyers and observing courtroom proceedings in preparation for the role. Claudia Puig of USA Today declared that "watching a veteran like Hopkins verbally joust with one of the best young actors in Hollywood is worth the price of admission". Manohla Dargis of The New York Times felt it was a treat to watch "the spectacle of that crafty scene stealer Anthony Hopkins mixing it up with that equally cunning screen nibbler Ryan Gosling ... Each actor is playing a pulp type rather than a fully formed individual, but both fill in the blanks with an alchemical mix of professional and personal charisma." The film grossed over $91 million worldwide.

Gosling was scheduled to begin filming The Lovely Bones in 2007. However, he left the production two days before filming began because of "creative differences" and was replaced by Mark Wahlberg. Gosling was cast as the father of the murdered teenage girl and initially felt he was too young for the role. The director Peter Jackson and the producer Fran Walsh persuaded him that he could be aged with hair and make-up changes. Before shooting began, Gosling gained 60 pounds (27 kilograms) in weight and grew a beard to appear older. Walsh then "began to feel he was not right. It was our blindness, the desire to make it work no matter what." Gosling later said, "We didn't talk very much during the preproduction process, which was the problem ... I just showed up on set, and I had gotten it wrong. Then I was fat and unemployed." He has said the experience was "an important realisation for me: not to let your ego get involved. It's OK to be too young for a role."

=== 2010–2012: Widespread recognition ===
Following a three-year absence from the screen, Gosling starred in five films in 2010 and 2011. "I've never had more energy," Gosling said. "I'm more excited to make films than I used to be. I used to kind of dread it. It was so emotional and taxing. But I've found a way to have fun while doing it. And I think that translates into the films." He has also spoken of feeling depressed when not working. In 2010, he starred opposite Michelle Williams in Derek Cianfrance's directorial debut, the marital drama Blue Valentine. The low-budget film was mainly improvised and Gosling has said "you had to remind yourself you were making a film." Mick LaSalle of the San Francisco Chronicle felt he "brings a preternatural understanding of people to his performance" while A.O. Scott of The New York Times found him to be "convincing as the run-down, desperate, older Dean, and maybe a bit less so as the younger version." Owen Gleiberman of Entertainment Weekly wrote that he "plays Dean as a snarky working-class hipster, but when his anger is unleashed, the performance turns powerful." However, Wesley Morris of The Boston Globe felt the performance was an example of "hipsterism misdirected." He was nominated for a Golden Globe Award for Best Actor – Motion Picture Drama. The film was a box office success, grossing over $12 million worldwide from a production budget of $1 million.

Gosling's second on-screen appearance of 2010 was in the mystery film All Good Things with Kirsten Dunst, based on a true story. He played the role of New York real-estate heir David Marks, who was investigated for the disappearance of his wife (played by Dunst). Gosling found the filming process to be a "dark experience" and did not undertake any promotional duties for the film. When asked if he was proud of the film, he said, "I'm proud of what Kirsten does in the movie." Peter Travers of Rolling Stone wrote that he "gets so deep into character you can feel his nerve endings." Mick LaSalle of the San Francisco Chronicle found the "chameleonic Gosling is completely convincing as this empty shell of a man". Betsy Sharkey of the Los Angeles Times felt that the film belonged to Dunst, but praised Gosling's performance. The film grossed $644,535 worldwide. Also in 2010, Gosling narrated and produced ReGeneration, a documentary that explores the cynicism in today's youth towards social and political causes.

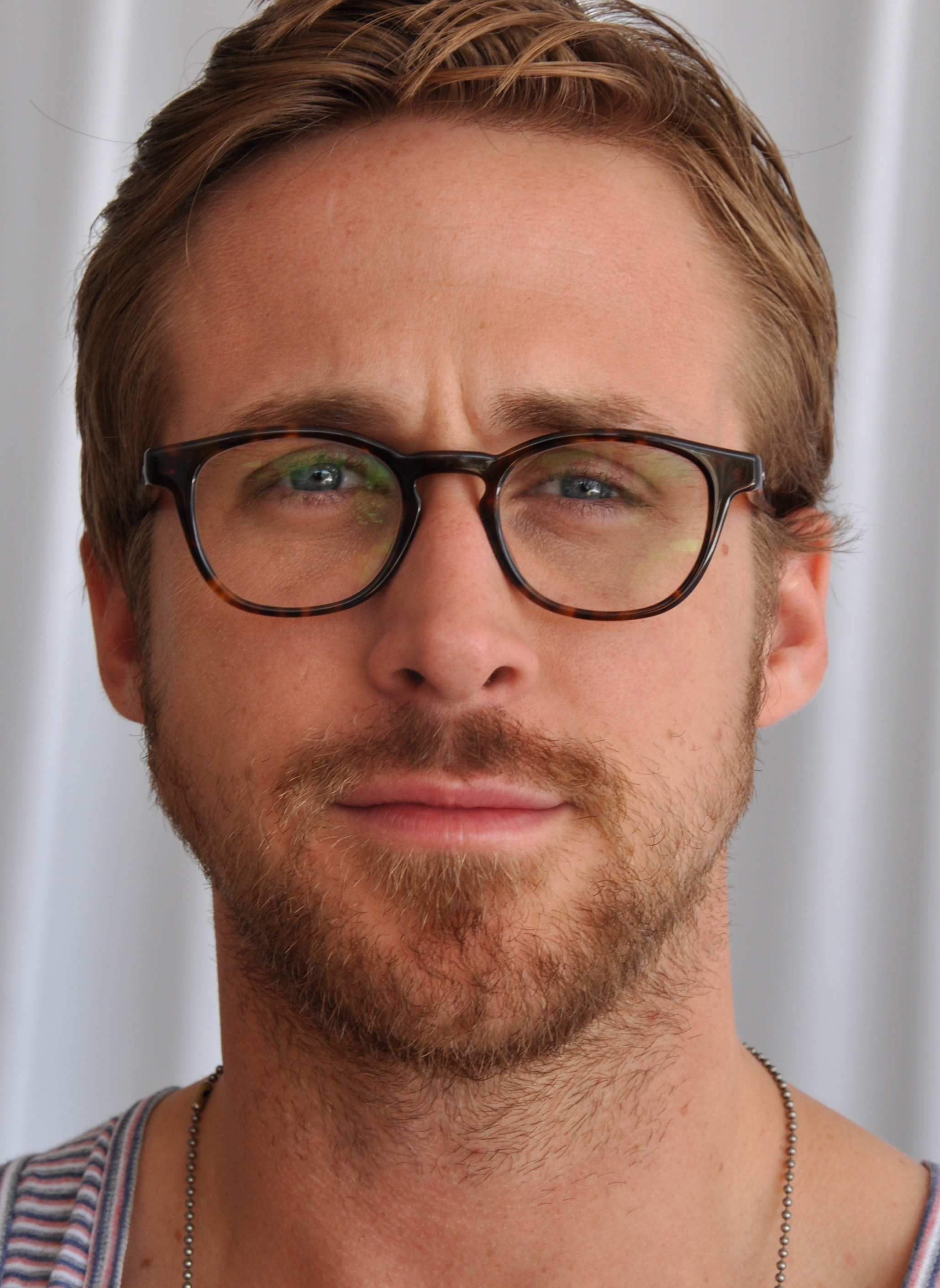
Gosling in 2011

2011 saw Gosling expand his horizons by appearing in three diverse, high-profile roles. He co-starred in his first comedic role in the romantic comedy-drama Crazy, Stupid, Love, with Steve Carell and Emma Stone. Gosling took cocktail-making classes at a Los Angeles bar in preparation for his role as a smooth-talking ladies' man. Ann Hornaday of The Washington Post said his "seductive command presence suggests we may have found our next George Clooney." Peter Travers declared him "a comic knockout" while Claudia Puig of USA Today felt he reveals a "surprising" "knack for comedy." He was nominated for a Golden Globe Award for Best Actor – Motion Picture Musical or Comedy. The film was a box office success, grossing over $142 million worldwide. With adjustments for inflation, it is the fourth most successful of Gosling's career.

Gosling's first action role was in Drive, based on a novel by James Sallis. Gosling played a Hollywood stunt performer who moonlights as a getaway driver, and he has described the film as a "violent John Hughes movie": "I always thought if Pretty in Pink had head-smashing it would be perfect." Roger Ebert compared Gosling to Steve McQueen and stated that he "embodies presence and sincerity ... he has shown a gift for finding arresting, powerful characters [and] can achieve just about anything." Joe Morgenstern of The Wall Street Journal pondered "the ongoing mystery of how he manages to have so much impact with so little apparent effort. It's irresistible to liken his economical style to that of Marlon Brando." The film was a box office success, grossing $81 million worldwide from a production budget of $15 million.

In his final appearance of 2011, Gosling co-starred with Philip Seymour Hoffman in the political drama The Ides of March directed by George Clooney, in which he played an ambitious press secretary. Gosling partly decided to do the film to become more politically aware: "I'm Canadian and so American politics aren't really in my wheelhouse." Joe Morganstern stated that Gosling and Hoffman "are eminently well equipped to play variations on their characters' main themes. Yet neither actor has great material to conjure with in the script." In a generally tepid review, Kenneth Turan of the Los Angeles Times asserted that it was "certainly involving to see the charismatic Gosling verbally spar with superb character actors like Hoffman and [Paul] Giamatti." Mick LaSalle of the San Francisco Chronicle felt there was "one aspect to the character that Gosling can't quite nail down, that might simply be outside his sphere, which is idealism." He was nominated for a Golden Globe Award for Best Actor – Motion Picture Drama. The film grossed $66 million worldwide.

=== 2013–2014: Mixed critical reception and directorial debut ===
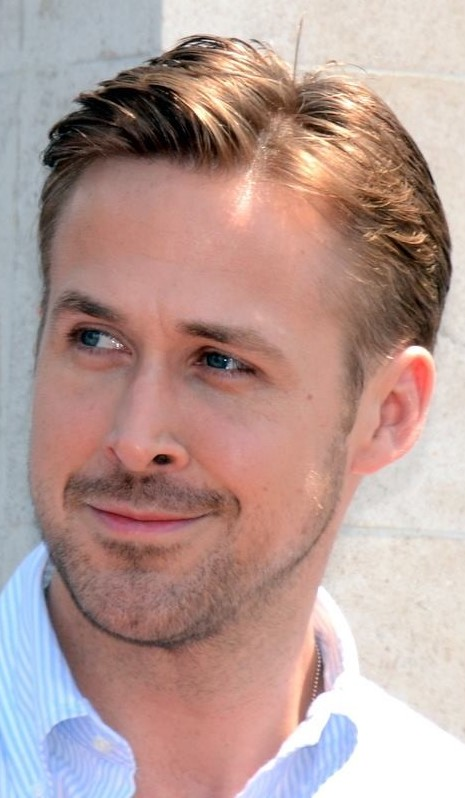
Gosling at the 2014 Cannes Film Festival

In 2013's crime thriller Gangster Squad, Gosling portrayed Sgt. Jerry Wooters, a 1940s LAPD officer who attempts to outsmart mob boss Mickey Cohen (played by Sean Penn). He was reunited with Emma Stone as his love interest, after their earlier pairing in Crazy, Stupid, Love. Stone has said she hopes they will find more projects to work together on. A.O. Scott of The New York Times described the film as an excuse for the cast "to earn some money trying out funny voices and suppressing whatever sense of nuance they might possess." Christy Lemire of The Boston Globe criticized Gosling's "weird, whispery voice" and his "barely developed, one-note" character. However, Betsy Sharkey of the Los Angeles Times felt that there was "a seductive power" in the scenes shared by Gosling and Stone: "But like too much else in the film, it's a scenario that is only half played out."

In The Place Beyond the Pines, a generational drama directed by Blue Valentine's Derek Cianfrance, Gosling played Luke, a motorcycle stunt rider who robs banks to provide for his family. The shoot was described by Gosling as "the best experience I have ever had making a film." A. O. Scott of The New York Times praised his performance, writing: "Mr. Gosling's cool self-possession — the only thing he was allowed to display in "Drive" — is complicated, made interesting, by hints of childlike innocence and vulnerability." Scott Foundas of The Village Voice was unimpressed: "Gosling's character verges on parody ... Gosling uses a soft, wounded half-whisper that tells us this is all some kind of put-on ... It's a close variation on the role Gosling played to stronger effect in Nicolas Winding Refn's existential Hollywood thriller, Drive, where it was clear the character was meant to be an abstraction." David Denby of The New Yorker remarked that he "reprises his inexorable-loner routine". The film grossed $35 million worldwide from a production budget of $15 million.

Later in 2013, Gosling starred in the violent revenge drama Only God Forgives, directed by Drive's Nicolas Winding Refn. Gosling undertook Muay Thai training in preparation for the role, and has described the script as "the strangest thing I've ever read". Both the film and his performance drew negative reviews. David Edelstein of New York magazine stated, "Gosling looked like a major actor as a skinhead in The Believer and a star in Half Nelson. Then he stopped acting and started posing. His performance in Only God Forgives (would God forgive that title?) is one long, moist stare". Stephen Holden of the New York Times criticized Gosling's inability "to give his automaton any suggestion of an inner life". Peter Travers of Rolling Stone commented that Gosling, while "meant to be a blank page for us to write on, often looks merely blank".

In early 2013, Gosling announced that he was taking a break from acting, stating, "I've lost perspective on what I'm doing. I think it's good for me to take a break and reassess why I'm doing it and how I'm doing it. And I think this is probably a good way to learn about that." Gosling's directorial debut Lost River competed in the Un Certain Regard section at the 2014 Cannes Film Festival. The "fantasy noir", written by Gosling, stars Christina Hendricks, Ben Mendelsohn, and Matt Smith. The film received largely unfavorable reviews. Peter Bradshaw of The Guardian found it "insufferably conceited" and remarked that Gosling had lost "any sense of proportion or humility." Robbie Collin of The Daily Telegraph described Lost River as "mind-bogglingly pleased with itself", while Variety's Justin Chang dismissed the "derivative" film as a "train-wreck."

=== 2015–present: Established actor ===
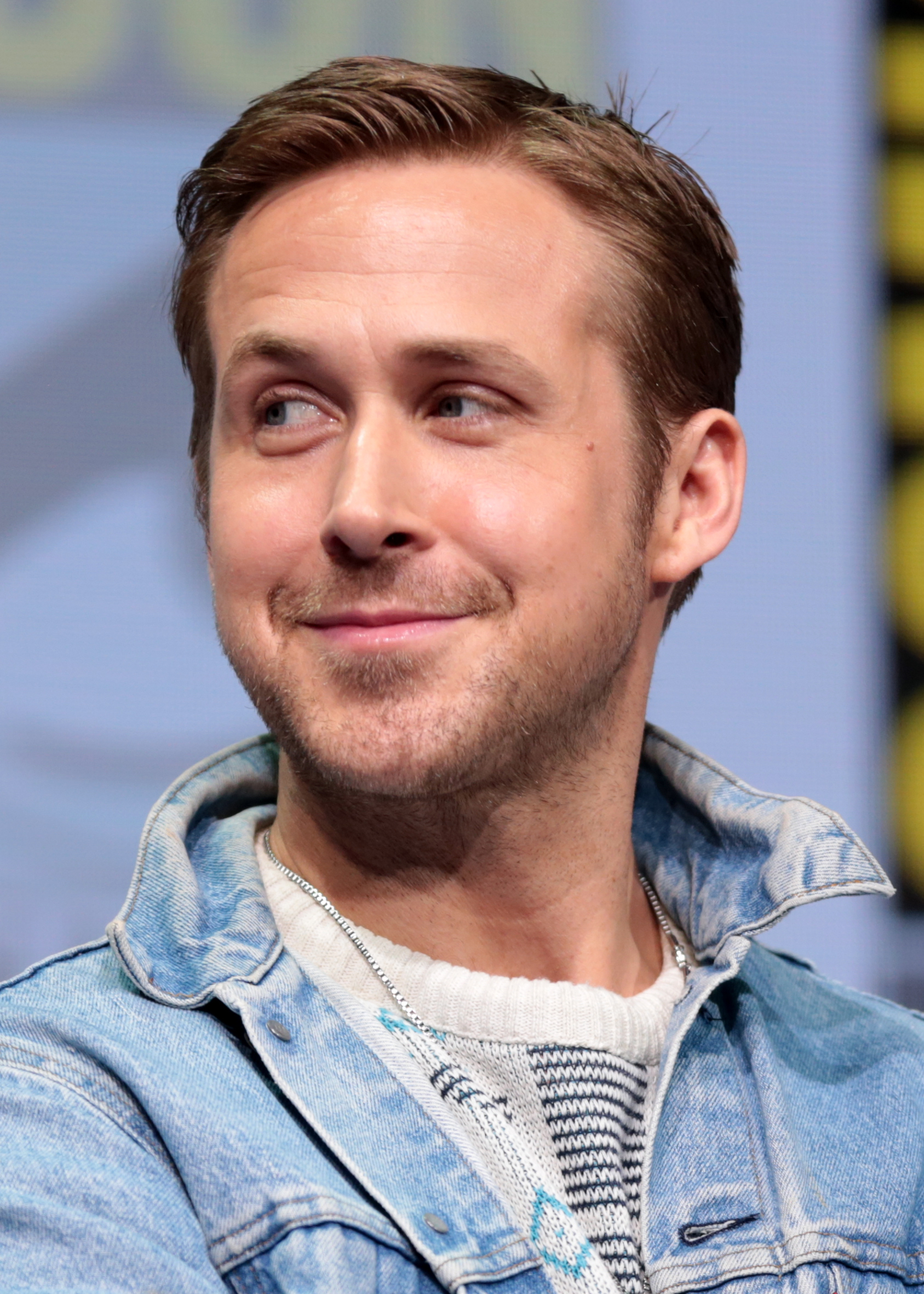
Gosling at the 2017 San Diego Comic-Con

In 2015, Gosling played a bond salesman in the ensemble financial satire The Big Short, a Best Picture nominee at the 2016 Academy Awards. David Sims of The Atlantic felt that he was "smarmily funny, somehow simultaneously magnetic and repulsive; after years wandering the halls of mediocre art cinema, it's wonderful to see him cut loose again." Peter Travers of Rolling Stone said: "Gosling, a virtuoso of verbal sleaze, talks directly to the camera, and he's volcanically fierce and funny." The following year, Gosling starred in the black comedy The Nice Guys, opposite Russell Crowe, and in Damien Chazelle's musical La La Land, for which he won the Golden Globe Award for Best Actor – Motion Picture Musical or Comedy and received his second Academy Award for Best Actor nomination. Robbie Collin praised his chemistry with co-star Emma Stone, writing: "Both stars are so attuned to each other's pace and flow that their repartee just seems to tumble out, perfectly formed." It emerged as one of his most commercially successful films, with earnings of over $440 million against its $30 million budget.

Gosling was signed on to work with Terrence Malick in 2004 on the biographical film Che, but later dropped out. He later starred in Malick's Song to Song (2017), which had been filmed in 2012, and co-starred Rooney Mara, Michael Fassbender, and Natalie Portman. Also in 2017, he starred in Blade Runner 2049, a sequel to the 1982 science fiction film Blade Runner, directed by Denis Villeneuve and co-starring Harrison Ford, who reprised his role as Rick Deckard. Gosling's role was as Officer K, a "blade runner" working for the LAPD whose job it is to kill rogue bioengineered humans known as replicants. A. O. Scott found him to be perfectly cast, adding that his "ability to elicit sympathy while seeming too distracted to want it – his knack for making boredom look like passion and vice versa – makes him a perfect warm-blooded robot for our time". Despite being Gosling's largest box office opening, grossing $31.5 million domestically, the film generally underperformed at the box office.

In 2018, Gosling portrayed Neil Armstrong, the astronaut who became the first man to walk on the Moon in 1969, in Chazelle's biopic First Man, based on the book First Man: The Life of Neil A. Armstrong. Writing for IndieWire, Michael Nordine commended him for bringing "quiet charisma" and "grace" to his role, while Nicholas Barber of the BBC hailed him as the "best deadpan actor in the business". He received a nomination for the Critics' Choice Movie Award for Best Actor.

After a four-year break from film, Gosling returned starring in the 2022 spy-action thriller The Gray Man, opposite Chris Evans and Ana de Armas. The film had a limited theatrical release and was distributed by Netflix to negative reviews from critics, who described the film as "mediocre" and full of cliches. A sequel has been announced and is in development. In the following year, Gosling starred as Ken in Greta Gerwig's fantasy comedy Barbie, opposite Margot Robbie in the title role. He also sang the song "I'm Just Ken" for the film's accompanying soundtrack as well as a cover of "Push" by Matchbox Twenty. His performance was acclaimed, with Anthony Lane of The New Yorker lauding his comedic performance as "peak Gosling", and Vulture's Alison Willmore wrote that he "comes close to stealing the movie". He received Golden Globe, Critics' Choice, Screen Actors Guild, BAFTA, and Academy Award nominations for his performance. He performed "I'm Just Ken" live at the 96th Academy Awards, where it was nominated for Best Original Song.

Gosling next starred in the action comedy film The Fall Guy alongside Emily Blunt. It received positive reviews from critics but did not perform well commercially. In 2026, Gosling produced and starred in Project Hail Mary, based on Andy Weir's science fiction novel of the same name. His performance in the film received critical acclaim. He will star in Shawn Levy's space opera film Star Wars: Starfighter, and will produce Rachel Morrison's romantic drama Love of Your Life starring Margaret Qualley and Patrick Schwarzenegger. Since 2017, Gosling has been attached to co-produce a film adaptation of Jeff Lemire's 2012 graphic novel The Underwater Welder. In February 2021, Gosling signed to star in The Actor, an adaptation of Donald E. Westlake's novel Memory. Duke Johnson will direct the film and produce with Abigail Spencer under their Innerlight Films production banner. Gosling, who will also produce alongside Ken Kao, will play the lead role of Paul Cole, who must deal with his damaged memory as he struggles to rebuild his life after being left for dead and hospitalized in 1950s Ohio.

In July 2026, during San Diego Comic-Con, it was announced that Gosling would star as Ghost Rider in the Marvel Cinematic Universe film of the same name, scheduled to be released in 2028.

== Music career ==
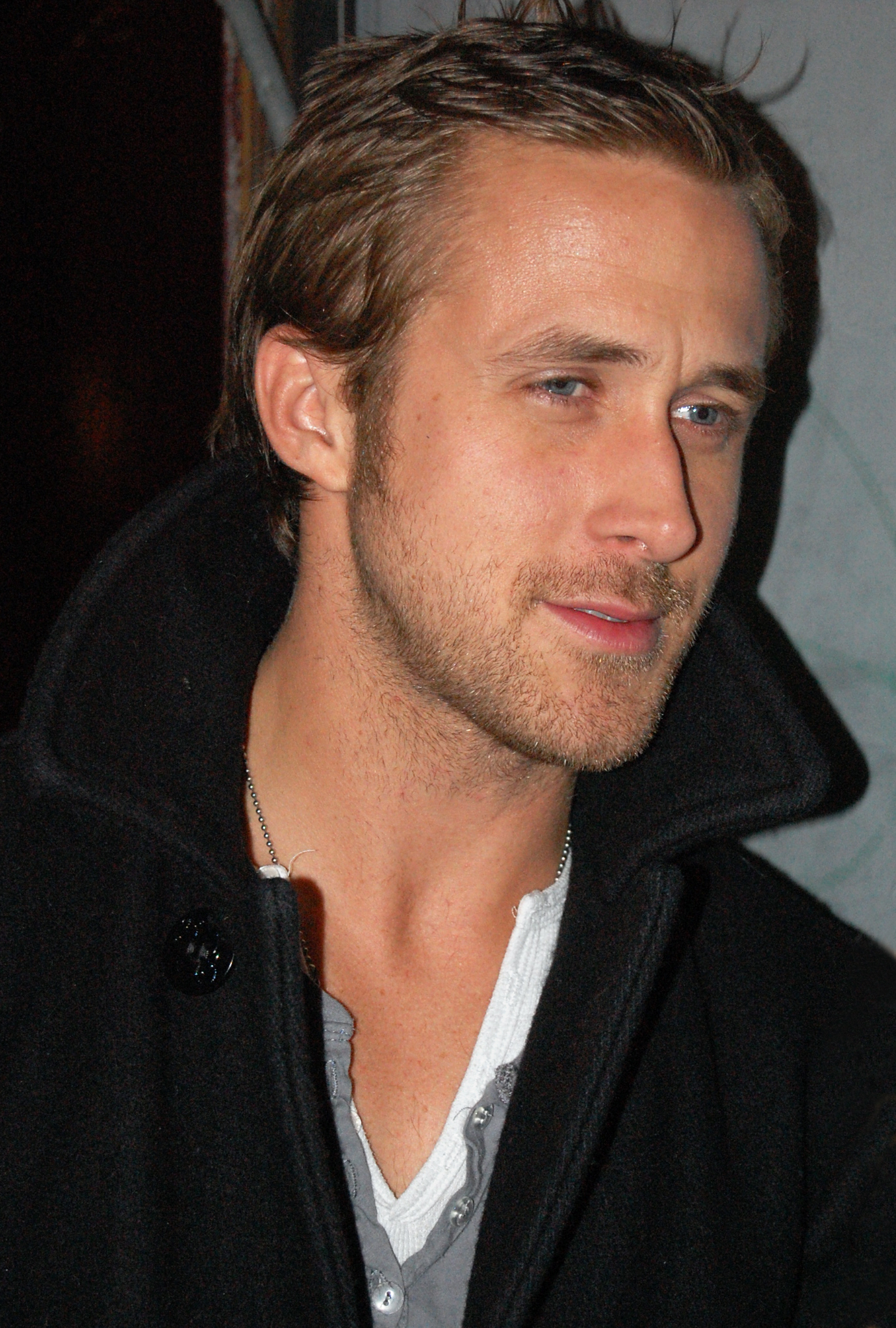
Gosling at a Dead Man's Bones concert in 2009

In 2000, Gosling published a solo album with the misspelled title Angel With Tatooed Wings. The track "Put Me in the Car" from this album was made available for download on the Internet in 2007. Also that year, Gosling and his friend Zach Shields formed the indie rock band Dead Man's Bones. The two first met in 2005 when Gosling was dating Rachel McAdams and Shields was dating her sister, Kayleen. They initially conceived of the project as a monster-themed musical but settled on forming a band when they realized putting on a stage production would be too expensive.

They recorded their eponymous debut album with the Silverlake Conservatory's Children's Choir and learned to play all the instruments themselves. Gosling contributed vocals, piano, guitar, bass guitar and cello to the record. The album was released through ANTI- Records on October 6, 2009. Pitchfork Media was won over by the "unique, catchy and lovably weird record" while Prefix felt the album was "rarely kitschy and never inappropriate". However, Spin felt the album "doesn't reverse the rule that actors make dubious pop musicians" and Entertainment Weekly criticized its "cloying, gothic preciousness".

In September 2009, Gosling and Shields had a three-night residency at LA's Bob Baker Marionette Theater where they performed alongside dancing neon skeletons and glowing ghosts. They then conducted a thirteen-date tour of North America in October 2009, using a local children's choir at every show. Instead of an opening act, a talent show was held each night. In September 2010, they performed at Los Angeles' FYF Festival. In 2011, the actor spoke of his intentions to record a second Dead Man's Bones album. No children's choir will be featured on the follow-up album because "it's not very rock 'n' roll".

== Personal life ==
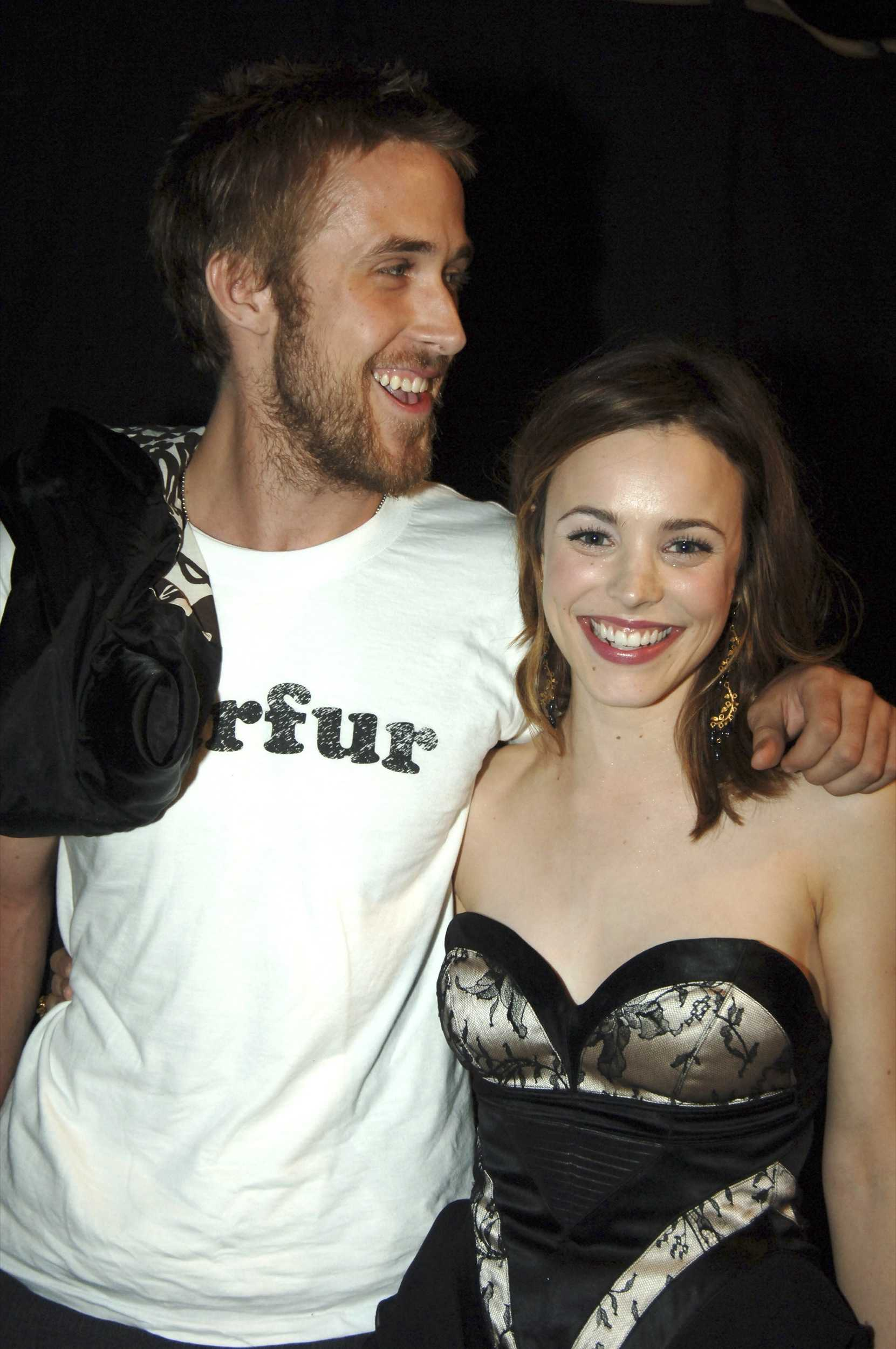
Gosling and Rachel McAdams in 2005

Despite his Mormon upbringing, Gosling now describes himself as "religious but nondenominational."

Gosling previously resided in New York City. He co-owns Tagine, a Moroccan restaurant in Beverly Hills, California. He bought the restaurant on an impulse; he said he spent "all [his] money" on it, spent a year doing the renovation work himself, and now oversees the restaurant's menus.

Gosling had a relationship with his The Notebook co-star Rachel McAdams from 2005 to 2008. He has been in a relationship with his The Place Beyond the Pines co-star Eva Mendes since September 2011. They have two daughters, born in 2014 and 2016.

When asked in a 2022 interview if she and Gosling had married, Mendes said, "I like to keep it all mysterious."

=== Charity work ===
Gosling supports various social causes. He has worked with PETA to encourage KFC and McDonald's to use improved methods of chicken slaughter, and on a campaign encouraging dairy farmers to stop dehorning cows.

In 2005, Gosling volunteered in Biloxi, Mississippi, in the clean-up effort following Hurricane Katrina. He is a supporter of Invisible Children, Inc., a group that raises awareness about the Lord's Resistance Army (LRA) in Central Africa. In 2005, he traveled to Darfur refugee camps in Chad. He was a speaker at Campus Progress' National Conference in 2008, where he discussed Darfur. As part of his work with the Enough Project, he visited Uganda in 2007 and eastern Congo in 2010.

== Awards and nominations ==
Among his many accolades, Gosling has received three Academy Award nominations, two British Academy Film Award nominations, one Golden Globe Award from six nominations, and six Actor Award nominations.

In 2006, his role as a troubled history teacher in the drama film Half Nelson gained him nominations for an Academy Award and an Actor Award for Best Actor. He received nominations for an Academy Award, BAFTA Award, Golden Globe Award and Actor Award for La La Land (2016) and Barbie (2023) in the Best Actor and Best Supporting Actor categories respectively, winning a Golden Globe Award for the former. His performances in Lars and the Real Girl (2007), Blue Valentine (2010), The Ides of March, and Crazy, Stupid, Love (both 2011); also earned him Golden Globe nominations.

== See also ==
- List of Canadian Academy Award winners and nominees
- List of oldest and youngest Academy Award winners and nominees – Youngest nominees for Best Lead Actor
- List of actors with Academy Award nominations
- List of actors with more than one Academy Award nomination in the acting categories
- List of Golden Globe winners
