= Stay (2005 film) =

2005 film directed by Marc Forster

- Theatrical release poster
- Directed by: Marc Forster
- Written by: David Benioff
- Produced by: Arnon Milchan
- Starring: Ewan McGregor; Naomi Watts; Ryan Gosling
- Cinematography: Roberto Schaefer
- Edited by: Matt Chessé
- Music by: Asche & Spencer
- Production companies: Regency Enterprises; New Regency
- Distributed by: 20th Century Fox
- Release dates: September 24, 2005 (Rio de Janeiro); October 21, 2005
- Running time: 99 minutes
- Country: United States
- Language: English
- Budget: $50 million
- Box office: $8.4 million

Stay is a 2005 American psychological thriller directed by Marc Forster and written by David Benioff. It stars Ewan McGregor, Naomi Watts, Ryan Gosling and Bob Hoskins, with production by Regency and distribution by 20th Century Fox. The film represents intense relationships centering on reality, love, death, suicide, and the afterlife.

== Plot ==
Henry Letham sits next to a car crash on the Brooklyn Bridge. Then, he gets up and leaves. Psychiatrist Sam Foster and his fiancée Lila meet up before work. Sam's new patient, Henry, is a college student and aspiring artist whom he describes as depressed and paranoid, with feelings of guilt and remorse. During Sam's first meeting with Henry, Henry mentions that he sometimes hears voices, and seems able to predict future events. Henry is also suspicious of Sam because his regular psychiatrist, Beth Levy, has suddenly taken leave.

Sam meets with Henry after playing chess with a blind friend. When he introduces his friend, Leon, Henry is upset, because he says the man is his dead father. Not recognizing Henry, Leon leaves the room.

That night Sam attempts to call Beth, to no avail. The next day, Henry hints to Sam of his plans to kill himself that Saturday at midnight. Lila, who survived a past suicide attempt, offers to help to dissuade Henry from killing himself. Henry disappears that night.

Sam investigates Henry's circumstances and, after attempting to reach Dr. Levy, comes to her apartment and finds her disoriented and lethargic.

Henry, who earlier claimed his parents were dead, has his account contradicted by Sam when he finds Henry's mother and her dog living in a bare house, confused about Sam's identity and refusing to respond to questions. Henry's mother's head starts bleeding and when Sam attempts to help her, her dog bites him.

At the clinic, while having his dog-bitten arm treated, Sam discusses the visit with a police officer who is curious as to why he would visit that house. Sam explains what happened, but the police officer tells him that he had attended the funeral of the woman who lived there several months ago. This seems to send Sam into a fugue in which the same scene and dialogue is repeated several times.

Later, Sam contacts Athena, a waitress with whom Henry has mentioned that he had fallen in love. She is an aspiring actress and he meets her at a script reading where she is reading lines from Hamlet with another man. She agrees to take him to Henry, but after a long trip down winding staircases he loses her. When he gets back to the rehearsal room, she is there reading the same lines as when he first encountered her.

The search continues until 11:33 pm on Saturday, less than half an hour before Henry plans to kill himself. At a bookshop known to have been frequented by Henry, Sam finds a painting that Henry painted and bartered for books about Henry's favorite artist, Tristan Reveur. The artist killed himself on the Brooklyn Bridge on his 21st birthday. Henry's twenty-first birthday is Sunday, and Sam realizes that Henry plans to commit suicide on the Brooklyn Bridge, imitating the artist.

Sam finds Henry on that bridge in a physical atmosphere that is increasingly unraveling. Sam admits to Henry that he does not know what is real anymore. Henry tells Sam that he now knows the world is a dream, and shoots himself with his gun.

The car crash of the first scene is then reprised. Henry was fatally wounded in the crash but, in his last moments, is suffering survivor guilt, thus spending his final moment in the dream in which the story occurred. Each of the characters introduced earlier was actually a random spectator at the site of the crash, including doctor Sam and nurse Lila, who treat Henry in an attempt to save him.

They fail to rescue Henry, and Henry dies, but not before seeing Lila as Athena and proposing to her, which Lila accepts out of sympathy. Sam asks Lila out for coffee, saying he cannot sleep after what happened.

== Cast ==
- Ewan McGregor as Dr. Sam Foster
- Naomi Watts as Lila Culpepper
- Ryan Gosling as Henry Letham
- Bob Hoskins as Dr. Leon Patterson
- Janeane Garofalo as Dr. Beth Levy
- Elizabeth Reaser as Athena
- B.D. Wong as Dr. Bradley Ren
- Kate Burton as Maureen Letham
- Amy Sedaris as Toni
- Isaach de Bankolé as The Professor
- Michael Gaston as Sheriff Kennelly
- Mark Margolis as the book store owner
- Jessica Hecht as Bobby's Mother
- Sterling K. Brown as Freddy
- Michael Devine as Security Guard
- Michael Gray as Piano Mover #1
- Riley G Matthews Jr as Officer #1
- Vito Violante as Officer #2

== Production ==
Marc Forster's directorial style is artistic, referencing many other films including Vertigo. Details such as the length of a character's trousers and what he is wearing on his feet are significant, too. Forster has spoken of the film's stylistic link to the films of Nicolas Roeg as there are what appear to be continuity mistakes, which are in fact tied into the plot. Forster said filming took place during late fall 2003, and editing went through several stages, as he took some time off to promote his 2004 fantasy drama film Finding Neverland in order to release the two films separately. The final draft of the movie was finished by January 2005.

== Reception ==
=== Box office ===
The film was a massive box office failure, with a domestic gross of $3,626,883 and a foreign gross of $4,856,914, making a total worldwide gross of $8,483,797; it did not come close to making up for its estimated budget of $50,000,000.

=== Critical response ===
At review aggregator Rotten Tomatoes, 26% of 121 critics positively reviewed the film, and the average rating is 4.66/10. The critical consensus reads: "A muddled brain-teaser, Stay has a solid cast and innovative visuals but little beneath the surface." Metacritic, which uses a weighted average, assigned the film a score of 41 out of 100, based on 29 critics, indicating "mixed or average" reviews. Audiences polled by CinemaScore gave the film an average grade of "C−" on an A+ to F scale.

Roger Ebert of the Chicago Sun-Times gave the film 3½ stars out of four, saying, "The ending is an explanation, but not a solution. For a solution we have to think back through the whole film, and now the visual style becomes a guide. It is an illustration of the way the materials of life can be shaped for the purposes of the moment." Peter Travers of Rolling Stone also praised the film, awarding it three stars out of four and saying, "Some people find this twisty and twisted psychological thriller arty and pretentious. I find it arty and provocative."

James Berardinelli of ReelViews gave Stay 2½ stars out of four, calling it "interesting" but finding it "hard to recommend to anyone but the small cadre of David Lynch devotees who will inhale anything with a whiff of similarity to their favorite auteur's scent." Lisa Schwarzbaum of Entertainment Weekly gave the film a "C", praising the "profuse imagery" but ultimately feeling it to be "a tepid film" with "flat characters" and "anchorless performances".

Many critics had far more negative assessments. Rex Reed of The New York Observer wrote, "This is the kind of flop that makes even the popcorn taste lousy." Andrew O'Hehir wrote in Salon, "A lot of talent gets expended in Stay. (I'm not including whoever dressed McGregor.) Too bad the movie they made, while effective in short spurts, is almost a complete waste of time. Michael Booth wrote in The Denver Post, "What's this movie about?" and added, "Stay goes nowhere for far too long, then tries to go everywhere in just a couple of final moments. I can't tell you how they try to explain it, in part because that would give away what little satisfaction the movie holds, and in part because I have no blooming idea.

== See also ==
- An Occurrence at Owl Creek Bridge
- Jacob's Ladder
