= The Ides of March (2011 film) =

2011 film directed by George Clooney

- Theatrical release poster
- Directed by: George Clooney
- Screenplay by: George Clooney; Beau Willimon; Grant Heslov
- Based on: Farragut North by Beau Willimon
- Produced by: George Clooney; Grant Heslov; Brian Oliver
- Starring: Ryan Gosling; George Clooney; Philip Seymour Hoffman; Paul Giamatti; Marisa Tomei; Jeffrey Wright; Evan Rachel Wood
- Cinematography: Phedon Papamichael
- Edited by: Stephen Mirrione
- Music by: Alexandre Desplat
- Production companies: Cross Creek Pictures; Exclusive Media Group; Crystal Sky Entertainment; Smokehouse Pictures; Appian Way Productions
- Distributed by: Columbia Pictures (through Sony Pictures Releasing; United States); Exclusive Media Group (International)
- Release dates: August 31, 2011 (Venice); October 7, 2011 (United States)
- Running time: 101 minutes
- Country: United States
- Language: English
- Budget: $12.5 million
- Box office: $76.3 million

The Ides of March is a 2011 American political drama film directed by George Clooney from a screenplay written by Clooney, Grant Heslov, and Beau Willimon. The film is an adaptation of Willimon's 2008 play Farragut North. It stars Ryan Gosling and Clooney alongside Philip Seymour Hoffman, Paul Giamatti, Marisa Tomei, Jeffrey Wright, and Evan Rachel Wood.

The Ides of March was featured as the opening film at the 68th Venice International Film Festival and at the 27th Haifa International Film Festival, and was shown at the 2011 Toronto International Film Festival. It was theatrically released on October 7, 2011, and grossed $76 million worldwide. The film received positive reviews from critics and was chosen by the National Board of Review as one of the top ten films of 2011. Gosling earned a Golden Globe Award nomination for his performance, while Clooney, Heslov and Willimon were nominated for an Academy Award for Best Adapted Screenplay.

== Plot ==
Stephen Meyers is a talented political staffer and the junior campaign manager for Pennsylvania Governor Mike Morris. Just days before the pivotal primary elections in Ohio and North Carolina, Stephen and senior campaign manager Paul Zara work to secure Morris the Democratic nomination for president and defeat rival Ted Pullman.

The New York Times reporter Ida Horowicz seeks an inside scoop on the Ohio primary. Paul is confident in Morris's odds from his career experience while Stephen believes deeply in Morris's political cause. Ida warns Stephen that Morris will disappoint him. Before leaving, Paul tells Ida off the record that they're pursuing the endorsement of North Carolina Senator Franklin Thompson, a DINO whose control over 356 pledged delegates would secure Morris the nomination.

Stephen takes a meeting with Tom Duffy, Pullman's senior campaign manager, who offers Stephen a job and calls him “the best media mind in the country.” Duffy claims the race is about to turn in Pullman's favor and reveals that they won Thompson's endorsement by promising him the post of Secretary of State. Stephen criticizes this kind of "dirty politics", but Duffy argues that it is necessary to win. Stephen admits that he met with Duffy, angering Paul, and shares Pullman's deal with Thompson. He encourages Morris to put Thompson on the ticket, but Morris refuses on principle.

Stephen begins a casual sexual relationship with Molly Stearns, a young intern and daughter of DNC Chairman Jack Stearns. One night while Molly is sleeping, Stephen answers her phone to discover Governor Morris on the line. Molly confesses to a one-night-stand with Morris that has left her pregnant. She asks Stephen for money to get an abortion, too afraid to ask her Catholic father. Stephen's faith in Morris begins to fade as he scrambles to avoid the scandal. He allocates funds for Molly's abortion but fires her from the campaign, claiming that mistakes mean you “lose the right to play.”

Meanwhile, Ida confronts Stephen about his meeting with Duffy. Paul reveals that he leaked the story to Ida and fires Stephen for disloyalty. Enraged, Stephen goes to join Pullman's campaign -- promising dirt on Morris -- but Duffy declines, nervous about Stephen's desire for revenge. He again praises Stephen's talent but admits that he sabotaged Stephen just to gain a political edge in the campaign. Duffy finally encourages Stephen to leave politics before he grows cynical and jaded.

After her abortion, Molly learns secondhand that Stephen was fired and swore to destroy the campaign. Fearing exposure of her affair, she fatally overdoses on post-abortion pills. Stephen discovers the scene and blackmails Governor Morris with a fictional suicide note from Molly.

To avoid the scandal, Morris fires Paul and promotes Stephen to senior campaign manager. He then offers Thompson the post of Vice President, securing his endorsement and becoming the de facto Democratic nominee for president. On the way to a press interview, Stephen stonewalls Ida. Following a speech from Morris on dignity and integrity, Stephen prepares to explain how they secured Thompson's endorsement.

== Cast ==
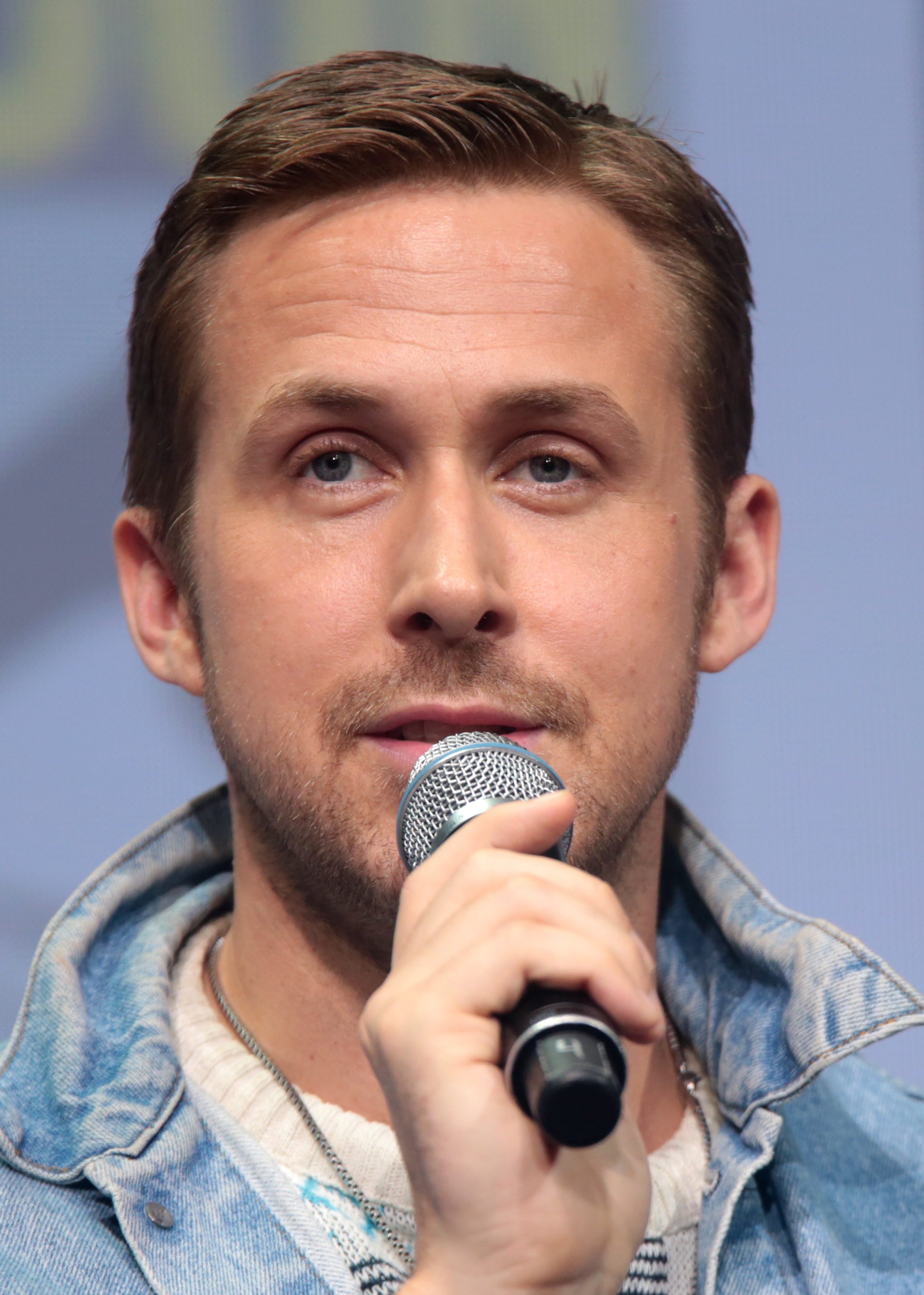
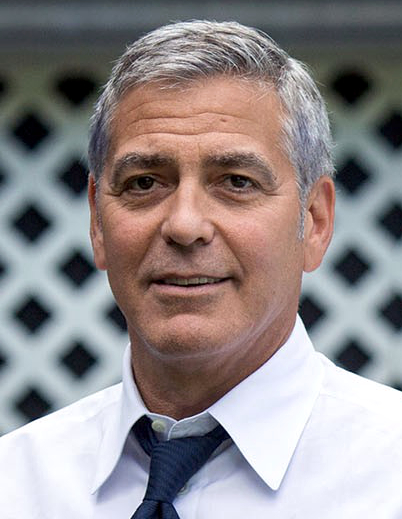
Ryan Gosling in 2017 (left) and George Clooney in 2016
- Ryan Gosling as Stephen Meyers, Morris' junior campaign manager and press secretary.
- George Clooney as Mike Morris, the charismatic Governor of Pennsylvania and a Democratic presidential candidate.
- Philip Seymour Hoffman as Paul Zara, Morris' campaign manager and Stephen's superior and mentor.
- Paul Giamatti as Tom Duffy, Ted Pullman's campaign manager.
- Evan Rachel Wood as Molly Stearns, an intern for Morris's campaign and Stephen's love interest.
- Marisa Tomei as Ida Horowicz, a reporter for the New York Times.
- Jeffrey Wright as Franklin Thompson, Democratic Senator from North Carolina.
- Max Minghella as Ben Harpen, a member of Morris's campaign staff.
- Jennifer Ehle as Cindy Morris, wife to Governor Mike Morris and the First Lady of Pennsylvania.
- Gregory Itzin as former Senator Jack Stearns, father of Molly Stearns and the chairman of the Democratic National Committee.
- Charlie Rose as himself.
- Michael Mantell as Ted Pullman, Senator from Arkansas and Morris's opponent in the Democratic primaries.

== Production ==
In October 2010, Variety reported that George Clooney signed on to produce, direct, and star in the film adaptation of Beau Willimon's Broadway play Farragut North. Exclusive Media Group, Cross Creek Pictures, Smoke House Pictures, and Leonardo DiCaprio's Appian Way Productions financed the film. Filming in Cincinnati, Ohio began in February 2011 in Downtown Cincinnati at Fountain Square, Over-the-Rhine historic district, Northside, Mount Lookout, Xavier University, other neighborhoods and at Miami University's Farmer School of Business and Hall Auditorium (Miami University and Hall Auditorium are located in Oxford, Ohio). Principal photography also took place in Downtown Detroit and Ann Arbor, Michigan. On 14 March, filming began at the University of Michigan and included 1,000 extras.

The theatrical release failed to recognize Cincinnati in the credits as a filming location. Producer and screenplay co-writer Grant Heslov said that "the omission of Cincinnati in the credits was an inadvertent mistake, something that slipped through the cracks." He also said that the credits would be corrected for the home release of the film.

== Release ==
The Ides of March premiered on August 31, 2011, as the opening film of the 68th Venice International Film Festival. Sony Pictures Entertainment bought the distribution rights for the United States only, while Alliance Films bought Canadian distribution. Sony wanted Clooney to keep the play's title, but The Ides of March was picked as the title. The Ides of March was originally planned to have a limited release in December 2011 and a wide release in January 2012. However, Sony eventually moved the film's opening date to 14 October 2011. This was later moved again, to October 7, 2011.

== Reception ==
On Rotten Tomatoes, the film holds an approval rating of 84% based on 243 reviews, with an average rating of 7.38/10. The website's critics consensus reads: "While not exactly exposing revelatory truths, The Ides of March is supremely well-acted drama that moves at a measured, confident clip." On Metacritic the film has a weighted average score of 67 out of 100, based on 43 critics, indicating "generally positive reviews". Audiences polled by CinemaScore gave the film an average grade of "B" on an A+ to F scale.

Some critics gave the film mixed or even negative reviews. A. O. Scott of the New York Times wrote, "But it is difficult, really, to connect this fable to the world it pretends to represent. Whatever happens in 2012, within either party or in the contest between them, it seems fair to say that quite a lot will be at stake. That is not the case in The Ides of March, which is less an allegory of the American political process than a busy, foggy, mildly entertaining antidote to it."

=== Accolades ===
List of awards and nominations
Awards group	Category	Recipients and nominees	Result
84th Academy Awards	Best Adapted Screenplay	George Clooney, Grant Heslov, and Beau Willimon	Nominated
65th British Academy Film Awards	Best Supporting Actor	Philip Seymour Hoffman	Nominated
65th British Academy Film Awards	Best Adapted Screenplay	George Clooney, Grant Heslov, Beau Willimon	Nominated
Broadcast Film Critics Association	Best Acting Ensemble		Nominated
Casting Society of America	Outstanding Achievement in Casting for a Studio or Independent Drama Feature	Ellen Chenoweth, Amelia McCarthy	Nominated
Central Ohio Film Critics Association Awards	Best Film		Nominated
Central Ohio Film Critics Association Awards	Best Adapted Screenplay		Nominated
Central Ohio Film Critics Association Awards	Best Ensemble		Nominated
Central Ohio Film Critics Association Awards	Actor of the Year	George Clooney (Also for The Descendants)	Nominated
Central Ohio Film Critics Association Awards	Actor of the Year	Ryan Gosling (Also for Drive and Crazy, Stupid, Love.)	Runner-up
David di Donatello Awards	Best Foreign Film		Nominated
68th Venice International Film Festival.	Brian Award		Won
Australian Academy of Cinema and Television Arts Awards	Best Film – International		Nominated
Australian Academy of Cinema and Television Arts Awards	Best Screenplay – International	George Clooney, Grant Heslov and Beau Willimon	Won
Australian Academy of Cinema and Television Arts Awards	Best Actor – International	Ryan Gosling	Nominated
69th Golden Globe Awards	Best Picture – Drama		Nominated
69th Golden Globe Awards	Best Director	George Clooney	Nominated
69th Golden Globe Awards	Best Actor – Drama	Ryan Gosling	Nominated
69th Golden Globe Awards	Best Screenplay	George Clooney, Grant Heslov, Beau Willimon	Nominated
Hollywood Movie Awards	Hollywood Editor Award	Stephen Mirrione	Won
National Board of Review	Top Ten Films		Nominated
Palm Springs International Film Festival	Chairman's Award	George Clooney (Also for The Descendants)	Won
Producers Guild of America Award	Outstanding Producer of Theatrical Motion Pictures	George Clooney, Grant Heslov, Brian Oliver	Nominated
World Soundtrack Awards 2012	Best Score of the Year	Alexandre Desplat	Nominated
World Soundtrack Awards 2012	Best Soundtrack Composer of the Year	Alexandre Desplat	Nominated

== See also ==
- Politics in film
