= Dead Man's Bones =

American rock duo

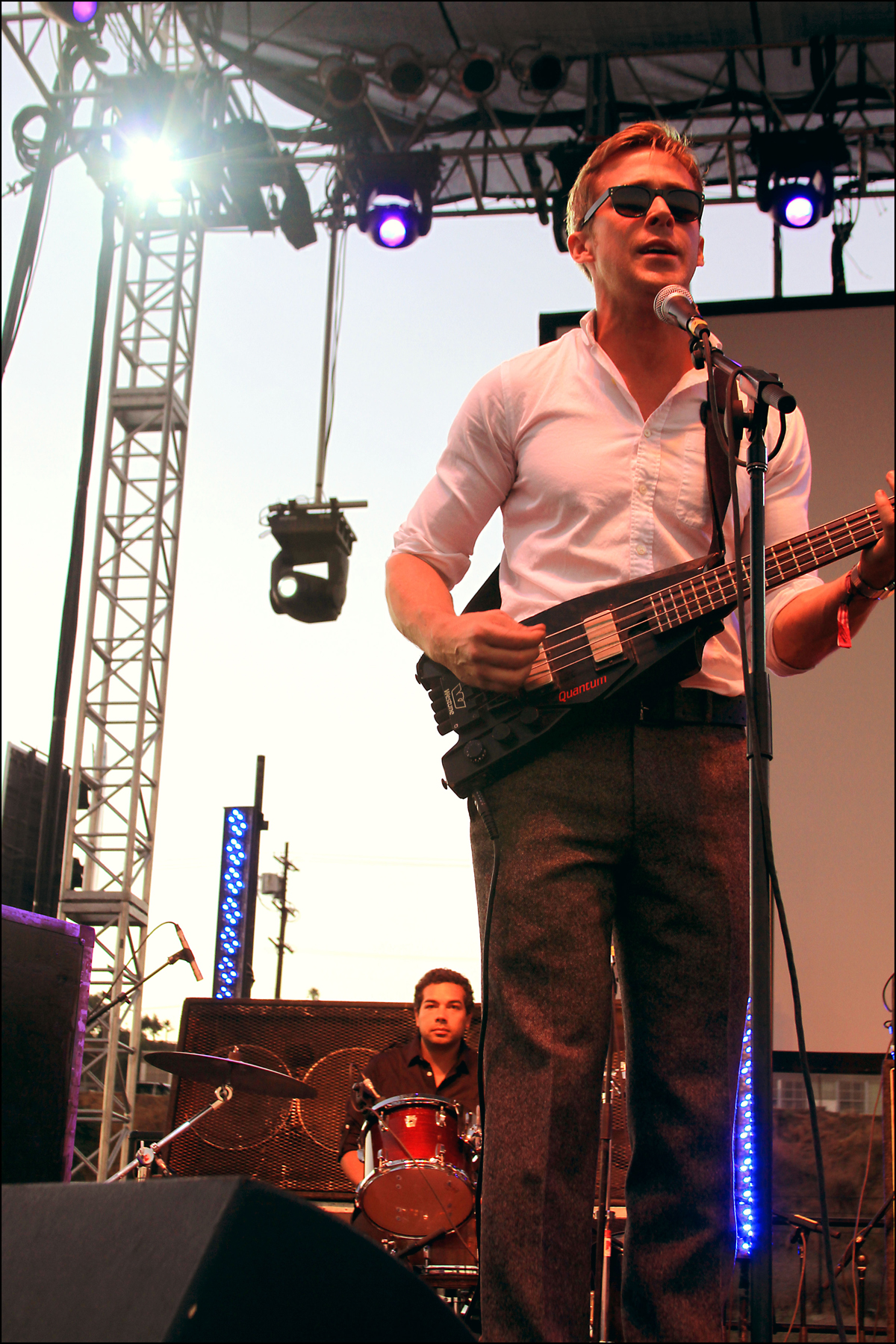
- Gosling and Shields performing live

Background information
- Origin: Los Angeles, California
- Genres: Indie rock; Folk rock; Gothic Folk; Post-Punk
- Years active: 2007–2012, 2026–present
- Label: ANTI-
- Members: Ryan Gosling; Zach Shields
- Website: https://deadmansbonesmusic.com/

Dead Man's Bones is a rock duo consisting of actor, Ryan Gosling (vocals, guitar, bass) and Zach Shields (drums). Their first album, Dead Man's Bones, was released on October 6, 2009, through ANTI- records. The entire album is a collaboration with the Silverlake Conservatory Children's Choir — started by Red Hot Chili Peppers bassist Flea — from Los Angeles, California.

== Background and development ==
When Shields and Gosling met in 2005 they discovered a mutual obsession with the Haunted Mansion ride at Disneyland. Shields was so interested with ghosts as a kid, that he was admitted into therapy, and Gosling's parents moved out of his childhood home because they believed it was haunted. Neither of them had outgrown their fascination with graveyards or anything deathly and decided to write love stories about ghosts and monsters.

The pair chose to play all the instruments on the record, even those they had never touched before. They also imposed rules on themselves during the recording process, such as not playing with a click track, and trying to do no more than three takes on any song, letting any imperfections highlight the strengths of the music. On December 25, 2008, Dead Man's Bones released a music video and free download for their song "In the Room Where You Sleep", and on April 4, 2009, the band released another music video for their song "Name in Stone" on MySpace and YouTube. The self-titled debut album from the band featured members of the Silverlake Conservatory of Music's children's choir and was released on October 6, 2009, through ANTI- and was produced by Tim Anderson of Ima Robot. Gosling and Shields also toured around the United States for the fall and Halloween of 2009 with a local choir and talent show at every show to rave reviews. Each children's choir was similar to Silverlake Conservatory Children's Choir with whom they recorded the album. In 2010, they released two other music videos for tracks: "Dead Hearts" and "Pa Pa Power".

Gosling's use of a children's choir was cited as inspiration for blackened death metal band Behemoth to do the same on their 2018 album I Loved You at Your Darkest. They have also been cited as an influence on Our Time Down Here.

In the closing credits of the 2013 French film, Age of Panic, the Dead Man's Bones song "Lose Your Soul" is featured. The song "In the Room Where You Sleep" was included in the soundtrack of the 2013 film, The Conjuring.

The song "Lose Your Soul" is featured at the end of episode 3 of Netflix's 2026 series The Boroughs, and in the 2026 movie They Will Kill You.

Following a 17 year hiatus, the band released the single "Lost In The Night" on October 27, 2026. It was recorded in a single day, on a farm outside Los Angeles, using two guitars, two drum machines, and two synthesizers. The track marked a shift from Gothic Folk, Indie Rock, Doo-Wop, and choir-backed arrangements from their 2009 debut, toward a synth-driven blend of Post-Punk, New Wave, Gothic Rock and Dark wave. It was released alongside a music video featuring Noah Jupe and Rain Spencer.

== Discography ==
Release year	Album
2009	Dead Man's Bones

1. "Intro"
2. "Dead Hearts"
3. "In the Room Where You Sleep"
4. "Buried in Water"
5. "My Body's a Zombie for You"
6. "Pa Pa Power"
7. "Young & Tragic"
8. "Paper Ships"
9. "Lose Your Soul"
10. "Werewolf Heart"
11. "Dead Man's Bones"
12. "Flowers Grow out of My Grave"

Release year	Single
2026	Lost In The Night

== Members ==
=== Current lineup ===
- Ryan Gosling – vocals, bass guitar, guitar, piano, keyboards (2007–2012, 2026–present)
- Zach Shields – vocals, drums, percussion, guitar (2007–2012, 2026–present)

=== Live/session members ===
- Morgan Slade – bass guitar, electric organ

=== Technical personnel ===
- Shiviah Silvah – assistant engineer
