= The Believer (2001 film) =

2001 film by Henry Bean

- Theatrical release poster
- Directed by: Henry Bean
- Screenplay by: Henry Bean
- Story by: Henry Bean; Mark Jacobson
- Produced by: Susan Hoffman; Christopher Roberts
- Starring: Ryan Gosling; Billy Zane; Theresa Russell; Summer Phoenix
- Cinematography: Jim Denault
- Edited by: Mayin Lo; Lee Percy
- Music by: Joel Diamond
- Production company: Seven Arts Pictures
- Distributed by: Fireworks Pictures; IDP Distribution
- Release dates: January 19, 2001 (Sundance); May 17, 2002 (United States)
- Running time: 98 minutes
- Country: United States
- Languages: English; Hebrew
- Budget: $1.5 million
- Box office: $1.3 million

The Believer is a 2001 American drama film written and directed by Henry Bean in his feature directorial debut, based on a story by Bean and Mark Jacobson. Starring Ryan Gosling, Billy Zane, Theresa Russell, and Summer Phoenix, the film follows Daniel Balint, a Jew who becomes a neo-Nazi. The film is loosely based on the true story of Dan Burros, a member of the American Nazi Party and the New York branch of the United Klans of America who died by suicide after being revealed as Jewish by a reporter from The New York Times.

The Believer premiered at the Sundance Film Festival on January 19, 2001, where it won the Grand Jury Prize. It was theatrically released in the United States on May 17, 2002, to positive reviews, with particular praise for Gosling's performance. The film earned several accolades, including the Golden St. George at the 23rd Moscow International Film Festival. It received four nominations at the 17th Independent Spirit Awards, Best First Feature and Best Screenplay for Bean, Best Male Lead for Gosling, and Best Supporting Female for Summer Phoenix.

== Plot ==
The film begins with a continuing series of flashbacks into the childhood of Daniel Balint, a young Jewish yeshiva student. Brilliant but troubled, he often challenged his teachers with unorthodox interpretations of scripture. During a debate about the Binding of Isaac, Daniel argues that the story was not about Abraham's faith but God's power: that God's purpose was not to have Abraham accomplish a particular task, but rather to demand unquestioning obedience, harshly depicting God as a bully. It is from these early experiences that Daniel begins to defect from his Jewish identity.

In the present day, Daniel is now a fanatically violent neo-Nazi in New York in his early twenties. Daniel and his group of skinhead friends find a meeting of fascists run by Curtis Zampf and Lina Moebius, where he also makes a connection with Lina's daughter Carla. Daniel advocates killing Jews, and a banker named Manzetti in particular, but Curtis and Lina oppose harming Jews on practical if not moral grounds. Impressed with Daniel's intelligence and oratory, Lina invites him to their camp retreat in the country. Afterward, Daniel and his neo-Nazi friends pick a fight with two African-American men, get arrested, and are bailed out by Carla. He spends the night with her but returns to his ailing father's home where he is harangued by his sister Linda for his Nazi beliefs, but she also urges him to stay and have Shabbat dinner. The men watch TV, which is forbidden on the Sabbath according to some Orthodox Jews, leading them to commiserate on the incomprehensibility of Jewish law.

Guy Danielsen, a journalist writing an article on hate groups, meets Daniel for an interview. He listens to Daniel's antisemitic speech, but then reveals that he knows Daniel is Jewish from tracking down his old rabbi and bar mitzvah record. Enraged by this, Daniel pulls out a pistol and threatens to commit suicide if Guy publishes the truth.

Daniel goes to the fascist camp retreat, where he meets Drake, a skilled marksman, along with an explosives expert. Six of the retreat participants, including Daniel, go to a Jewish deli, where they torment the owner about Jewish dietary laws until a fight breaks out. Daniel and his friends are required by a court to take sensitivity training, where they listen to the experiences of Holocaust survivors. One talks about how his infant son was murdered by a Nazi. Daniel is enraged that the man did nothing to save his son, but all the survivors assert that Daniel would also have done nothing, and he walks out in anger.

The story haunts him, and he imagines himself as the Nazi. Later that night, Daniel and the gang break into a synagogue, vandalize it, and plant a time bomb under the pulpit. They also tear, trample, and spit on a Torah scroll, though Daniel protests. After they leave, Daniel takes the scroll and a tallit katan with him. The next morning, the neo-Nazis hear on the news that the bomb failed to go off. Back in his cabin, Daniel puts on the tallit under his shirt and performs a combination of the Nazi salute and a Hagbaha.

Drake approaches him with a plan to kill Manzetti. Outside a temple, Daniel fires at him but misses. Drake discovers the tallit and realizes that he is a Jew, so Daniel shoots him and escapes. He continues to meet with Lina and Curtis, who want to start an above-ground movement to bring fascism into the political mainstream, inviting Jews, blacks, and liberals. Daniel reluctantly agrees to help them raise funds. At the meetings that follow, Daniel first charms, then enrages, their potential donors with his intellectual games, leading to his expulsion. When news breaks that Manzetti was killed, Lina suspects Daniel, since he proposed the assassination, but Drake is the real killer.

Carla comforts Daniel and they sleep together at his home. When she sees the stolen Torah, she asks Daniel to teach her Hebrew. He soon runs into an old friend and his fiancée, Stuart and Miriam, who invite him to a Rosh Hashanah service, assuming that he is an anti-racist skinhead. When Daniel arrives, another old friend calls him out as a racist skinhead. As he is leaving, Miriam, who works for the District Attorney, tells him that half of the people in Lina's meetings are informants for the D.A. She asks Daniel to record conversations at a meeting so she can help him with possible charges stemming from the Manzetti killing, but he refuses.

As Yom Kippur approaches, Daniel calls Miriam and insists on taking Stuart's place leading the Ne'ila service at the bimah on Yom Kippur. He and his friends plant a new bomb under the temple's pulpit even though they find it reinforced, limiting the explosion. When Daniel takes the pulpit the next day, he is shocked to see Carla in the congregation. He again imagines himself in the story the Holocaust survivor told him, this time as both the Nazi and the Jew. With minutes to go, Daniel stops and tells everyone to get out because there is a bomb, but refuses to leave himself.

There is a flash of light, and Daniel is shown ascending the stairs in the Jewish school he left as a child. His old teacher approaches, hoping to talk about the Binding of Isaac, and suggests that Isaac died on the mountain and was reborn in the world to come. But Daniel ignores him and keeps climbing up but unexplainably meets his teacher on every floor, asking Daniel to stop, calling out, "There's nothing up there."

== Cast ==
- Ryan Gosling as Daniel Balint
  - Jacob Green as Young Daniel Balint
- Billy Zane as Curtis Zampf
- Theresa Russell as Lina Moebius
- Summer Phoenix as Carla Moebius
- Ronald Guttman as Mr. Balint
- Glenn Fitzgerald as Drake
- Garret Dillahunt as Billings
- Heather Goldenhersh as Linda
- A. D. Miles as Guy Danielsen
- Tommy Nohilly as Whit
- Henry Bean as Ilio Manzetti
- Joshua Harto as Kyle
- Chuck Ardezzone as Chuck
- Elizabeth Reaser as Miriam
- Dean Strober as Stuart
  - Frank Winters as Young Stuart
- Judah Lazarus as Avi
  - James G. McCaffrey as Young Avi
- Sascha Knopf as Cindy Pomerantz
- Tovah Feldshuh as Woman in Shul
- Roberto Gari as Ancient Jew
- Eileen B. Weiss as Woman at Yom Kippur

== Reception ==
The Believer received an 82% approval rating on Rotten Tomatoes based on 95 reviews; the average rating is 7.34 out of 10. The consensus states: "Gosling commands the screen with a raw, electrifying performance." The film also has a score of 75 on Metacritic based on 28 reviews.

Jamie Russell of BBC Films said that it was "awe-inspiring ... a late contender for one of the best films of the year—an intellectually breathtaking, profoundly moving film." Charlotte O'Sullivan of The Independent said, "It's naturally thrilling...The Believer is astonishing." Time Out said, "the film is driven by Gosling's revelatory performance ... arresting, prickly, vaguely funny, even—'difficult' in the best sense."

Todd McCarthy for Variety said, "Bean deals with the core elements of this odd, and oddly compelling, situation with admirable frankness and intelligence, but flounders around the edges. The tenets of Zampf and Moebius' political movement receive such scant attention that the scenes devoted to it are borderline ludicrous, and the masochistic impulses that seem to draw Carla to Danny—"Hurt me!," she begs at the start of their first sexual encounter, and he willingly obliges—are rote and undeveloped."

Julie Salamon for The New York Times said, "This willfully provocative film portrait (...) offers lots of raging, vulgarity and shock but little insight into the character's psychopathology. (...) The movie's most telling moment comes when Danny confronts Holocaust survivors about why they allowed themselves to be brutalized. One of them, an old man, responds by asking, And what shall we learn from you, Daniel ? It's a good question, never answered.

David Germain for The Washington Post said, "Even as he commits hate crimes and becomes an anti-Jewish rabble-rouser, the youth is torn between contempt for Jewish passivity during the Holocaust and reverence for the traditions of Judaism."

== Home media ==
The Believer was released on DVD by Palm Pictures in the US and Canada. It was released on region-free Blu-ray via Capelight Pictures in 2020 and then as a Region-B release through Vertigo Releasing in the UK in 2022. As of 2026, there are no plans for a US release.

The film was given a 4K remaster by IndieCollect and shown at the Atlanta Jewish Film Festival for its 25th anniversary in 2026.

== See also ==
- Antisemitism in the United States
- American History X

Awards
Preceded by Girlfight tied with You Can Count on Me	Sundance Grand Jury Prize: U.S. Dramatic; 2001	Succeeded by Personal Velocity
