= The Nice Guys =

2016 American film by Shane Black

- Theatrical release poster
- Directed by: Shane Black
- Written by: Shane Black; Anthony Bagarozzi
- Produced by: Joel Silver
- Starring: Russell Crowe; Ryan Gosling; Angourie Rice; Matt Bomer; Margaret Qualley; Keith David; Kim Basinger
- Cinematography: Philippe Rousselot
- Edited by: Joel Negron
- Music by: John Ottman; David Buckley
- Production companies: RatPac-Dune Entertainment; Silver Pictures; Waypoint Entertainment
- Distributed by: Warner Bros. Pictures (United States and Canada); Bloom (International)
- Release dates: May 10, 2016 (TCL Chinese Theatre); May 20, 2016 (United States)
- Running time: 116 minutes
- Country: United States
- Language: English
- Budget: $50 million
- Box office: $62.8 million

The Nice Guys is a 2016 American neo-noir buddy action comedy film directed by Shane Black, who co-wrote the screenplay with Anthony Bagarozzi, produced by Joel Silver, and starring Russell Crowe and Ryan Gosling in the title roles, with Angourie Rice, Matt Bomer, Margaret Qualley, Keith David, and Kim Basinger appearing in supporting roles. Set in 1970s Los Angeles, the film focuses on private eye Holland March (Gosling) and enforcer for hire Jackson Healy (Crowe) who team up to investigate the disappearance of a teenage girl (Qualley).

The Nice Guys premiered on May 10, 2016, in Hollywood, screened on May 15 at the 2016 Cannes Film Festival and was released by Warner Bros. Pictures in the United States on May 20, 2016, receiving positive reviews from critics for its humor, mystery, and the performances of Crowe and Gosling but it flopped at the box office as it grossed $63 million on a $50 million budget. The film has gained a cult following especially for Gosling and Crowe's chemistry and comedy.

== Plot ==
In 1977 Los Angeles, Holland March is an alcoholic private eye hired by Mrs. Glenn to find her niece, porn star, Misty Mountains, whom she claims to have seen after her death. March's investigation leads him to Amelia Kuttner. A fearful Amelia hires Jackson Healy, a violent enforcer, to scare March away. After visiting March at his home and breaking his arm, he accepts a Yoo-hoo from March's teenage daughter, Holly, as he leaves. When Healy returns home (with a case of Yoo-hoo), he is interrogated by two thugs about Amelia. Believing Amelia is in danger, Healy wards them off, and teams up with a reluctant March, to find her.

The duo visit Amelia's anti-pollution protest group, and meet Chet, who brings them to the burnt-down house of Amelia's boyfriend, Dean, who died in the fire. They learn that Amelia and Dean were working with Misty on an "experimental film," combining pornography and investigative journalism.

The two infiltrate a party to search for the film's financier, Sid Shattuck. At the party, Healy discovers the film is missing, while March stumbles upon Shattuck's dead body, and crosses paths with Amelia. Holly, having snuck along to the party, stops one of the thugs from killing Amelia, but he is then struck by a car in a hit-and-run, and Amelia flees. Healy subdues the first thug, and finds the other dying in the road. He tells Healy that his boss has dispatched a hitman, nicknamed, "John Boy" to kill all witnesses. Healy discreetly kills the dying thug by strangling him. The police soon arrive at the scene.

March and Healy are met by Amelia's mother, Judith Kuttner, a high-ranking official in the Justice Department. Judith claims Amelia is delusional and hires them to find her, for which March demands $5,000 in payment. March and Healy then go to an airport hotel, where Amelia is meeting with distributors for the film. However, John Boy has arrived ahead of them and is slaughtering the distributors. The duo hastily retreat, only for Amelia to land on their car and accidentally knock herself unconscious.

They take her to March's house, where she accuses her mother of colluding with car makers to suppress the catalytic converter, which regulates exhaust emissions. Amelia created the film to expose their collusion and believes her mother has been killing everyone connected to the film. A disbelieving March calls Tally, Judith's assistant, and tells her Amelia has been found. Tally tells him the family's doctor will arrive to check on Amelia. At the same time, she tasks them with delivering a briefcase of money to Judith.

March accidentally crashes his car during the delivery, causing the briefcase to fly open, spilling out shredded paper; the delivery was really a diversion to draw them away from Amelia. John Boy arrives at March's house disguised as the family doctor, attacks Holly and her friend, Jessica, and engages in a shootout with the returning March and Healy. As John Boy evades the police, Amelia flees the house and unwittingly flags down his car, only to be shot and killed. The police question and release March and Healy, who have no evidence that Judith is behind the murders. March realizes that Mrs. Glenn saw Misty in a film projected against a wall. At Misty's house, they discover a film projector, with no film. They realize that Chet is the projectionist for the Los Angeles Auto Show, and will try to screen the film at the event.

At the auto show, Tally intercepts Healy and March at gunpoint. Holly distracts Tally, who is knocked unconscious. Amelia's film, which Chet spliced into the auto show presentation, implicates the auto executives. On the rooftop, March struggles with Thug #2; they both fall from the roof, but March lands in the pool while the thug falls to his death. Holly stops Tally from reaching the film. Healy overpowers John Boy, but spares his life at Holly's behest. March secures the film from thugs sent by the auto executives. Judith is arrested, but insists that it was Detroit who wanted Amelia dead, as she hired March and Healy to keep Amelia safe. Judith remarks that while she will go to prison, Detroit has still gotten away with trying to suppress the catalytic converter. At a bar on Christmas Eve, March shows Healy an advertisement for their new detective agency called, "The Nice Guys".

== Cast ==
- Russell Crowe as Jackson Healy
- Ryan Gosling as Holland March
- Angourie Rice as Holly March
- Matt Bomer as John Boy
- Margaret Qualley as Amelia Kuttner
- Yaya DaCosta as Tally
- Keith David as Older Guy
- Beau Knapp as Blueface
- Jack Kilmer as Chet
- Lois Smith as Mrs. Glenn
- Murielle Telio as Misty Mountains
- Gil Gerard as Bergen Paulsen
- Daisy Tahan as Jessica
- Kim Basinger as Judith Kuttner
- Ty Simpkins as Bobby

== Production ==
=== Development ===
Like Shane Black's previously directed film Kiss Kiss Bang Bang (2005), The Nice Guys takes inspiration from Brett Halliday, namely his novel Blue Murder. Black initially wrote a version of the script along with Anthony Bagarozzi in 2001 which established the characters but otherwise was vastly different. According to Black, each would start with one detective, he with March and Bagarozzi with Healy. Along the way, they swapped characters and eventually wrote a first draft. This version of the script failed to attract any buyers, and then Black reworked it into a 64-page version that would serve for a television pilot. CBS became attracted to it, but given the contents led to many objections by the Standards and Practices department, it eventually did not progress. Black would later, upon promoting the release of the final film, speak disparagingly of the idea of the television series, stating that such a show "wouldn't have been any good". By 2009, Bagarozzi suggested changing the film from a contemporary setting to the 1970s. Black's producer friend Joel Silver was initially wary of the idea as he felt audiences would not be as welcoming to a period piece, but he changed his mind after producing Sherlock Holmes (2009). Black stated the change in time period helped as in contrast to "the divisiveness that we see now", the 1970s was full of multiculturalism and "was the aftermath of the protests and you got a sense that we are all in it together". The contents also drew from films of the period such as Vanishing Point (1971) and Five Easy Pieces (1970). Bagarozzi noted how the title The Nice Guys aimed to be ironic and non-descriptive, as the two main characters were "literally the two worst people that we could think of and then trying to make that fun," given "one breaks arms for a living and the other cons old ladies out of money."

=== Casting ===
After Shane Black completed the Marvel Cinematic Universe (MCU) film Iron Man 3 in 2013, Silver asked Black what he wanted to do next and he expressed interest in doing The Nice Guys. The script was sent to Ryan Gosling and Russell Crowe, and both wound up taking the roles specifically for the prospect of working with each other. Gosling even stated that when he read the script already picturing Crowe as Healy, "the movie just immediately became so funny" as he had never seen Crowe in a similar role. Gosling and Crowe accepted in a period of three days, and Black cited the casting as the reason the film was able to move forward, summed up as "After thirteen years it just popped into place in three days". The film was announced in June 2014, and other casting news followed with Margaret Qualley and Angourie Rice officially joining in September. Matt Bomer, Keith David, Beau Knapp, and Kim Basinger were confirmed in October, and Ty Simpkins and Jack Kilmer were announced in November.

=== Filming ===
Principal photography began on October 27, 2014, in Atlanta and Decatur, Georgia. While production designer Richard Bridgland saw a challenge in that the green Atlanta differed too much from the desertic Los Angeles, he found some fitting locations such as Dallas Austin's house, the design of which was based on what architect John Lautner found in Southern California, and the Atlanta Hilton, which had not changed at all since being built in 1976. On October 31, a police station scene was filmed in Atlanta among extras. Filming also took place in Los Angeles, mostly to get exteriors of locations such as The Comedy Store.

Bridgland did his best to recreate the 1970s, researching from Super 8 films to documentary photographs, and basing the furniture on designers such as Verner Panton. Even the Misty Mountains glamour photography had Bridgland recruiting Arny Freytag, responsible for most Playboy centerfolds of the decade. For its part, Warner Bros. used its 1972–84 production logo (featuring the "Big W" logo designed by Saul Bass for Warner Communications) to open the film.

== Release ==
In the United States, the film was originally scheduled for a June 17, 2016 release, which Warner Bros. Pictures moved up to May 20, 2016, giving its previous date to Central Intelligence. The film had its premiere at the TCL Chinese Theatre in Hollywood on May 10, followed by a 1970s-themed after-party at The Hollywood Roosevelt Hotel, and screened at Cannes on May 15.

=== Home media ===
The film was released on digital on August 9, 2016, and DVD and Blu-ray on August 23, 2016. The Nice Guys was released on 4K Ultra HD Blu-ray on February 11, 2025.

== Reception ==
=== Box office ===
The Nice Guys grossed $36.3 million in the United States and Canada, and $25.5 million in other countries, for a worldwide total of $62.8 million, against a production budget of $50 million.

In the United States and Canada, the film was released alongside Neighbors 2: Sorority Rising and The Angry Birds Movie, and was projected to gross around $10 million from 2,865 theaters in its opening weekend. It grossed $3.9 million on its first day, including $700,000 from Thursday night previews. In its opening weekend the film grossed $11.3 million, finishing fourth at the box office behind The Angry Birds Movie ($39 million), Captain America: Civil War ($33.1 million) and Neighbors 2 ($21.8 million). Phil Walden of Forbes argued that the film could have performed higher if not for sharing its release with Neighbors 2, which shared the same older demographic the film targeted. The film made $6.5 million in its second weekend (including $8.4 million over the four-day Memorial Day weekend), finishing seventh.

=== Critical response ===
On review aggregator website Rotten Tomatoes, the film has an approval rating of 91% based on 326 reviews, with an average score of 7.6/10; the site's "critics consensus" reads: "The Nice Guys hearkens back to the buddy comedies of a bygone era while adding something extra, courtesy of a knowing script, and the irresistible chemistry of its leads." On Metacritic, the film has a weighted average score of 70 out of 100 based on 51 critics, indicating "generally favorable reviews". Audiences polled by CinemaScore gave the film an average grade of "B−" on an A+ to F scale, while PostTrak reported filmgoers gave it a 75% overall positive score and a 52% "definite recommend".

Mike Ryan of Uproxx praised Black's writing and said: "If you like Shane Black, you will like The Nice Guys. It's probably the Shane Black-est of all the Shane Black movies. Black has a knack for turning action movie expectations on their head mixed with knowing and rich dialogue." IGN gave the film a 9/10, writing, "Working from a tight and sharp script that perfectly balances the characters like a yin and yang of screw-ups ensures The Nice Guys is an absolute joy every step of the way." Richard Roeper of the Chicago Sun-Times gave the film 3 stars out of 4 and wrote: "Forget about Kevin Hart and Ice Cube in Ride Along 2, or Zac Efron and Robert De Niro in Dirty Grandpa, or Ben Stiller and Owen Wilson in Zoolander 2. Russell Crowe and Ryan Gosling are the funniest duo of the year so far in The Nice Guys". James Berardinelli described the film as reminiscent of Boogie Nights (1997), and wrote that "The Nice Guys is a refreshingly adult movie entering a marketplace saturated by teen-friendly superhero flicks and animated family fare. It's edgy (although not so edgy that it will turn off a mass market audience), funny, and fast-paced", giving the film a score of 3 stars out of 4.

A. O. Scott of The New York Times wrote that the film lacks the wistful, slyly political sense of history found in Paul Thomas Anderson's Inherent Vice (2014), also a quirky private investigator comedy set in the 1970s. Scott wrote: "Even nostalgic nonsense requires more than attitude and energy, which is all that Mr. Black has to offer. And despite all its restless detective work, The Nice Guys is unable to track down a soul or a reason for being." Todd McCarthy of The Hollywood Reporter wrote: "That the film mostly falls flat has far more to do with the largely unconvincing material rather than with the co-stars, who are more than game for the often clownish shenanigans Black and his co-writer Anthony Bagarozzi have concocted for them; in fit and starts [sic], the actors display a buoyant comic rapport." McCarthy praised the film's production design (by Richard Bridgland) and costume design (by Kym Barrett), due to their "vivid reminders of how much L.A. has spruced itself up over the past 40 years", as well as the cinematography (by Philippe Rousselot), due to "the figurative and possibly even literal use of a smog filter to evoke a physically and morally toxic environment."

In 2025, it was one of the films voted for the "Readers' Choice" edition of The New York Times' list of "The 100 Best Movies of the 21st Century," finishing at number 203.

=== Accolades ===
Accolades received by The Nice Guys
Award	Date of ceremony	Category	Recipient(s)	Result	Ref.
AARP Annual Movies for Grownups Awards	February 6, 2017	Best Buddy Picture	Ryan Gosling and Russell Crowe	Nominated	
Critics' Choice Awards	December 11, 2016	Best Comedy	The Nice Guys	Nominated	
Critics' Choice Awards	December 11, 2016	Best Actor in a Comedy	Ryan Gosling	Nominated	
Empire Awards	March 19, 2017	Best Comedy	The Nice Guys	Nominated	
Empire Awards	March 19, 2017	Best Female Newcomer	Angourie Rice	Nominated	
Empire Awards	March 19, 2017	Best Screenplay	The Nice Guys	Nominated	
Hollywood Music in Media Awards	November 17, 2016	Best Soundtrack Album	The Nice Guys	Nominated	
Houston Film Critics Society	January 6, 2017	Best Picture	The Nice Guys	Nominated	
Jupiter Awards	March 29, 2017	Best International Film	The Nice Guys	Nominated	
Jupiter Awards	March 29, 2017	Best International Actor	Russell Crowe	Nominated	
San Diego Film Critics Society	December 12, 2016	Best Comedic Performance	Ryan Gosling	Won	
Saturn Awards	June 28, 2017	Best Action or Adventure Film	The Nice Guys	Nominated	

== Future ==
In May 2016, prior to the film's release, Black said of a follow-up to the film: "I think it's a little premature to consider a sequel. I don't believe in jinxes necessarily, but we really need people to see this one before we can even talk about that. We're up against some stiff superhero competition and we just need people to, you know, maybe see Captain America six times, but not the seventh and see us instead."

In September 2017, Fox gave a script commitment to a contemporary female-led television version of the film titled The Nice Girls, to be produced by Silver Pictures Television and written by Michael Diliberti.

In August 2018, Black reiterated his desire to make a sequel, though he noted the film probably did not gross enough at the box office to make it likely.

In 2024, Gosling elaborated on why the film hadn't received a sequel stating: "So much of a sequel, I think, is decided by the opening weekend of a movie, and we opened up against Angry Birds, so Angry Birds just, just destroyed us. Angry Birds got a sequel."

== See also ==
- 1970s nostalgia
- American Hustle, 2013 American film about a operation of the late 1970s and early 1980s.
