= Half Nelson (film) =

- Theatrical release poster by Tze Chun
- Directed by: Ryan Fleck
- Written by: Anna Boden; Ryan Fleck
- Produced by: Jamie Patricof; Alex Orlovsky; Lynette Howell; Anna Boden; Rosanne Korenberg
- Starring: Ryan Gosling; Shareeka Epps; Anthony Mackie
- Cinematography: Andrij Parekh
- Edited by: Anna Boden
- Music by: Broken Social Scene
- Distributed by: THINKFilm
- Release dates: January 23, 2006 (Sundance); September 22, 2006 (United States)
- Running time: 106 minutes
- Country: United States
- Language: English
- Budget: $700,000
- Box office: $4.9 million

Half Nelson is a 2006 American drama film directed by Ryan Fleck and written by Fleck and Anna Boden. The film stars Ryan Gosling, Shareeka Epps and Anthony Mackie. It was scored by Canadian band Broken Social Scene. 26-year-old Gosling was nominated for the Academy Award for Best Actor for his performance, becoming the seventh-youngest nominee in the category at the time.

The story concerns an inner city middle-school teacher who forms a friendship with a student, after she discovers that he has a drug habit. The film is based on a 19-minute film made by Boden and Fleck in 2004, titled Gowanus, Brooklyn. It premiered in competition at the 2006 Sundance Film Festival. It was released theatrically on August 11, 2006.

== Plot ==
Dan Dunne is a young middle-school history teacher at a Brooklyn school, with a teaching style that rejects the standard curriculum in favor of an approach based upon dialectics. While he is an engaging teacher in the classroom, in his own time he is shown snorting and freebasing cocaine. Dan becomes upset when his ex-girlfriend, Rachel, turns up unexpectedly at a school basketball game, wanting to see him. A short while later, one of his students, Drey, catches him freebasing in the locker room.

Drey's family consists of her overworked single-mother and her brother, Mike, who is in prison for selling drugs for a neighborhood dealer, Frank. Drey's father is also absent, making her dependent on Dan for rides home from school. Her lack of supervision also makes her a target for Frank, who encourages her to sell drugs for him. As Dan and Drey's friendship develops, Dan perceives Frank to be a bad influence on her and tries to persuade him to stay away from her. Drey tries to get Dan to open up about his drug habit to her, though to no avail.

After a tense conversation with Frank about Drey, Dan becomes intoxicated and visits Isabel, another teacher at the school whom he has dated. Initially seeking affection, he then forces himself on her, and she defends herself and runs from him; Dan leaves after apologizing. The following day, Dan is hostile towards Drey, ignoring her concern for him and telling her they are not friends. Drey instead associates with Frank, and completes her first drug sale for him.

Dan goes to his parents' house for dinner, though he is distant and uninterested in the conversation. Dan's brother's girlfriend, Cindy, catches him freebasing in the garage; the two converse and she tells him a joke which makes him laugh. The same night, Drey is out with Frank, selling drugs. Drey arrives at a motel to make a delivery and finds a room of people using drugs. Dan is there and is revealed to be the buyer. The two do not talk as he hands her the money.

The next day, Dan is absent from school, and the class has a substitute teacher. Drey is affected by his absence, and declines a ride home from Frank once school is finished. She instead visits Dan's motel room, finding him hung-over from the previous night. Dan cleans himself up, before sitting down to drink a glass of water. Drey sits down and joins him. The film ends with Dan telling the same joke he heard from Cindy, but he gets the timing of the joke wrong, ruining it. Drey and Dan both break out in laughter at his failed joke.

== Cast ==
- Ryan Gosling as Dan Dunne, a troubled history teacher
- Shareeka Epps as Drey, a 13-year-old student of Dan's
- Anthony Mackie as Frank, a local drug dealer
- Monique Gabriela Curnen as Isabel Redding, a teacher
- Denis O'Hare as Jimbo, a teacher
- Starla Benford as Principal Joy Henderson
- Nathan Corbett as Terrance, a student
- Tyra Kwao-Vovo as Stacy, a student
- Jeff Lima as Roodly, a student
- Karen Chilton as Karen, Drey's mother
- Deborah Rush as Jo Dunne, Dan's mother
- Jay O. Sanders as Russ Dunne, Dan's father
- David Easton as Jeff Dunne, Dan's brother
- Nicole Vicius as Cindy, Jeff's girlfriend
- Collins Pennie as Mike, Drey's brother
- Tina Holmes as Rachel, Dan's ex-girlfriend
- Tristan Wilds as Jamal, a student
- Erica Rivera as Erika
- Bryce Silver as Bernard
- Kaela C. Pabon as Lena
- Stephanie Bast as Vanessa
- Eleanor Hutchins as Simone
- Sebastian Sozzi as Javier
- Thaddeus Daniels as Referee
- Raymond Anthony Thomas as Earle
- Ron Cephas Jones as Lloyd Dickson
- Christopher Williamson as Charles
- Leslie Eva Glaser as Rose
- Sharon Washington as Suzanne

== Reception ==
=== Box office ===
Half Nelson was given a limited theatrical release, opening in two theatres and peaking with 105 theatres. It grossed $2.7 million domestically (United States and Canada), and $2.2 million in other territories, for a worldwide total of $4.9 million, against a budget of $0.7 million.

=== Critical response ===
On the review aggregator website Rotten Tomatoes, 91% of 156 critics' reviews are positive, with an average rating of 7.6/10. The website's consensus reads: "Half Nelson features powerful performances from Ryan Gosling and Shareeka Epps. It's a wise, unsentimental portrait of lonely people at the crossroads. " Metacritic, which uses a weighted average, assigned the film a score of 85 out of 100, based on 31 critics, indicating "universal acclaim".

On the television show Ebert & Roeper that aired during the weekend of August 13, 2006, Richard Roeper and guest critic Kevin Smith gave Half Nelson a "two big thumbs up" rating. Smith said that it was probably one of the ten best films he had seen in the last decade. Jim Emerson, editor of Chicago Sun-Times, gave the film four-stars-out-of-four and called it a masterpiece.

Entertainment Weekly film critic Lisa Schwarzbaum awarded the film with an "A" and stated in her review for the film, "Half Nelson offers an opportunity to marvel, once again, at the dazzling talent of Ryan Gosling for playing young men as believable as they are psychologically trip-wired." LA Weekly critic Scott Foundas wrote, "At a time when most American movies, studio made or 'independent,' seem ever more divorced from anything approximating actual life experience, Half Nelson is so sobering and searingly truthful that watching it feels like being tossed from a calm beach into a raging current."

Los Angeles Times critic Kenneth Turan gave the film an enthusiastic response, stating in his review, "What is different about Half Nelson is the execution, the kind of subtlety in writing, directing and acting (by costars Shareeka Epps and Anthony Mackie as well as Gosling) you seldom see." Film critic Jonathan Rosenbaum of the Chicago Reader wrote that "a dedicated, charismatic, crack-addicted history teacher is the most believable protagonist in an American movie this year."

The Monthly film critic Luke Davies described the film as "engaging and elegant, unpredictable and non-didactic, a film which comfortably sits with its own ambiguities and even allows them to go largely unresolved," commending the film's fresh take on the occasionally exhausted "teacher with a heart of gold" story, achieved by "one of the [film's] quiet strengths ... that it doesn't try to resolve Dunne's journey of devouring". Davies concluded that the film's optimistic and pessimistic convergence deemed the film "transparent and sparkling and diamond-hard, a small gem." Paste Magazine named it one of the "50 Best Movies of the Decade" (2000–2009), ranking it at #16.

=== Music ===
Half Nelson: Original Motion Picture Soundtrack

Soundtrack album by Various Artists
- Released: August 8, 2006
- Recorded: 2006
- Genres: Indie pop Indie rock
- Length: 56:46
- Label: Lakeshore Records
- Producer: Mark Ronson

Professional ratings
Review scores
Source	Rating
Allmusic	3/5 stars

Half Nelson: Original Motion Picture Soundtrack was released in the United States and Canada on August 8, 2006, by Lakeshore Records. The Canadian band Broken Social Scene, featured prominently throughout the film, is also included on the soundtrack.

Track listing

No.	Title	Performer(s)	Length
1.	"Stars & Sons"	Broken Social Scene	5:09
2.	"Evacuation"	The Somnambulants	4:12
3.	"Wanted"	Rhymefest/Samantha Ronson	3:27
4.	"Black Hearts"	Remy Balon	3:18
5.	"A New England"	Billy Bragg	2:14
6.	"The Corner"	Saigon	4:20
7.	"Shampoo Suicide"	Broken Social Scene	4:07
8.	"Na Ni Na"	Conjunto Céspedes	5:21
9.	"Just Begun"	Baby Blak/King Honey	4:30
10.	"Sometimes"	Dujeous?	4:30
11.	"It's Alright to Cry"	Rosey Grier	2:25
12.	"Can't You See"	The Marshall Tucker Band	6:03
13.	"Da Da Dada"	Broken Social Scene	7:10
Total length:			56:46

== Accolades ==
Many of the nominations were for Ryan Gosling, including the Academy Award, for his performance as Dan Dunne.

- Academy Award for Best Actor (Ryan Gosling) — Nominated (2006)
- Black Reel Award for Best Breakthrough Performance (Shareeka Epps) — Nominated (2007)
- Boston Society of Film Critics Award for Best New Filmmaker (Ryan Fleck) — Winner; Best Supporting Actress (Shareeka Epps) — Nominated (2006)
- Broadcast Film Critics Association Award for Best Actor (Ryan Gosling) — Nominated; Best Young Actress (Shareeka Epps) — Nominated (2007)
- Chicago Film Critics Association Award for Most Promising Performer (Shareeka Epps) — Nominated (2006)
- Dallas-Fort Worth Film Critics Association – Russell Smith Award (Ryan Fleck) — Winner (2006)
- Deauville Film Festival – Jury Special Prize Ryan Fleck — Winner; Revelations Prize (Ryan Fleck) — Winner (2006)
- Gotham Independent Film Award for Best Feature (Ryan Fleck) — Winner; Breakthrough Actor (Shareeka Epps; Tied with Rinko Kikuchi for Babel); Breakthrough Director (Ryan Fleck) — Winner (2006)
- Independent Spirit Award for Best Female Lead (Shareeka Epps) — Winner; Independent Spirit Award for Best Male Lead (Ryan Gosling) — Winner; Independent Spirit Award for Best Director (Ryan Fleck) — Nominated; Best Feature (Jamie Patricof, Alex Orlovsky, Lynette Howell, Anna Boden, and Rosanne Korenberg) — Nominated; Best First Screenplay (Anna Boden and Ryan Fleck) — Nominated (2007)
- Locarno International Film Festival - Special Jury Prize (Ryan Fleck – Director, Anna Boden – Producer, Lynette Howell – Producer, Rosanne Korenberg – Producer, Alex Orlovsky – Producer, and Jamie Patricof – Producer) — Winner; Youth Jury Award – Special Mention (Ryan Fleck) — Winner; Golden Leopard (Ryan Fleck) — Nominated (2006)
- Nantucket Film Festival – Screenwriting Award (Anna Boden and Ryan Fleck) — Winner (2006)
- National Board of Review for Best Breakthrough Performance – Male (Ryan Gosling) — Winner (2006)
- Philadelphia Film Festival for Best Director (Ryan Fleck) — Winner (2006)
- San Francisco International Film Festival for Best Film (Ryan Fleck) — Winner (2006)
- Seattle International Film Festival – Golden Space Needle Audience Award for Best Actor (Ryan Gosling) — Winner (2006)
- Screen Actors Guild Award for Outstanding Performance by a Male Actor in a Leading Role (Ryan Gosling) — Nominated (2007)
- Stockholm Film Festival for Best Actor (Ryan Gosling) — Winner (2006)

== Home media ==
Half Nelson was released on DVD on February 13, 2007, courtesy of ThinkFilm and Sony Pictures. Bonus features include outtakes, deleted scenes, filmmaker commentary, and a music video by Rhymefest. The film has earned $16,180,000 in rentals and $1,538,323 in DVD sales. It was released on Blu-ray in the United Kingdom in November 2015.
