= Lost River (soundtrack) =

Soundtrack album by Johnny Jewel
- Released: March 30, 2015
- Recorded: 2014–2015
- Genre: Film score; film soundtrack
- Length: 93:43
- Label: Italians Do It Better
- Producer: Johnny Jewel

Johnny Jewel chronology
Bronson (2008)	Lost River (2015)	A Beautiful Now (2016)

Singles from Lost River
- 1. "Yes (Love Theme from Lost River)" Released: February 2, 2015; 2. "Yes (Lullaby from Lost River)" Released: February 2, 2015; 3. "Bullytown" Released: February 16, 2015; 4. "Shell Game" Released: March 16, 2015

Lost River is the soundtrack to the 2015 film of the same name directed by Ryan Gosling and stars Christina Hendricks, Saoirse Ronan, Iain De Caestecker, Matt Smith, Ben Mendelsohn, Barbara Steele and Eva Mendes. The film's musical score is composed by Johnny Jewel, featuring an original score with dialogues from the cast appearing as interludes in the score and contributions from Jewel's former bands Glass Candy, Chromatics, Desire and Symmetry. The soundtrack to the film was released on March 30, 2015 through Jewel's Italians Do It Better record label and further issued in triple LP vinyl editions in November 2015.

== Background and development ==
Gosling often goes to Jewel's show in Los Angeles since 2007; during the production of Drive (2011), he along with the director Nicolas Winding Refn and the film's producers and few crew members visited the tour of Jewel's Glass Candy performing in the city during 2010. Though Jewel had not seen any of Gosling's films, he shared a rapport with Gosling, Refn and the film's editor Matt Newman discussing about the musical landscape and the scores he inspired. During post-production, Jewel was replaced by Cliff Martinez, even though some of his songs are still included the film and its soundtrack.

Jewel did not meet Gosling until 2012, when Glass Candy was performing at the Fun Fun Fun Fest in Austin, Texas which Gosling attended where he was filming for Terrence Malick directorial Song to Song (2017). In February 2013, Gosling and Jewel met again and casually discussed about the film. Gosling later sent the script to Jewel, which he immediately liked it and called it as "swampy and deteriorating". Jewel then sent him a mixtape of about five hours of music based on his ideas from the script which Gosling included in the edited footage. Jewel inspired specific compositions from John Carpenter and Ennio Morricone in his mind while scoring the film, as "there was a lot of dead space and it reminded me of a western, and I wanted the element of half-soundtrack, half-sound-design, a romanticized version of a disintegrated space where it's just a no man's land, a junkyard."

Jewel added that the two recurring themes were water and metal, "the two things that defined what the characters are struggling with". He used a waterphone to provide a recurring gong-like sound inspired by High Noon (1952). Wind chimes were used "to represent the characters having a lack. The idea sonically was to have tones that would be individual, build and overlap. As things become more heightened, the wind chime becomes violent, more metallic, more stressful." The scrapped piece from the score was a theme for Frankie that was utilized with the help of a Fisher-Price wind-up record player, describing his relationship to the metal being more innocent.

Jewel recorded 90 minutes of music for the film. Besides his score, Jewel nearly utilized nearly eight pieces of dialog as interludes in the soundtrack which were used from the outtakes instead from the film. The use of dialogues in the score exceeded the 10-second limit which resulted in Jewel's manager discussing with SAG-AFTRA for over a month, as "no one had ever done a soundtrack that way". Eventually, Jewel had to compensate the actor's day rate plus 17.4 percent of the day rate to cover the SAG dues. The album also featured music from Jewel's former bands Glass Candy, Chromatics, Desire and Symmetry; Saoirse Ronan and Ben Mendelsohn also contributed songs from the film.

== Release ==
Chromatics issued two songs—"Yes" (Love Theme from Lost River) and "Yes" (Lullaby from Lost River)—as singles on February 2, 2015. Jewel's score "Bullytown" with dialogues from Matt Smith was released as the third single on February 16, 2015. Glass Candy's song "Shell Game" was released as the fourth single on March 16, 2015. The soundtrack was released through Jewel's independent record label Italians Do It Better on March 30, 2015, ten days ahead of the film's release. It was further issued in a 3xLP purple-colored vinyl edition on November 9, 2015 which consisted only 26 tracks, compared to the initial digital and CD release of the album. The vinyl edition was pressed in 20,000 copies and sold in United States, Australia, France and Japan.

== Reception ==
Nick Neyland of Pitchfork assigned 7 (out of 10), summarising "The depth and breadth of this album makes it feel archival, as if someone excavated Jewel's vaults for material long after the film was released [...] This is a cut above the rest, but listening to it occasionally feels like sifting through a yard sale looking for gold." Geerit Feenstra of KEXP-FM wrote "From beginning to end, the Lost River soundtrack is a weird, wonderful, and vibrant mixture, from innocent bliss to crimelord hell, Lost River isn't afraid to brave the peaks and valleys of its accompanying film, and with Johnny Jewel and Italians Do It Better at the helm, things go off without a hitch. This soundtrack is a roller coaster ride unlike any cult movie soundtrack reissue you'll pick up anywhere." Geoffrey Macnab of The Independent described it as "wonderfully atmospheric". Oliver Lyletton of IndieWire wrote "the score, by Drive soundtrack contributor Johnny Jewel, is one of the film's best elements". Peter Labuza of The Film Stage described it as "half ominous tones of evil and half uplifting, Drive-style techno." Simon Reynolds of Digital Spy wrote "the excellent Johnny Jewel-composed soundtrack only amplifies the dream-like atmosphere". Marc Savlov of The Austin Chronicle described the score as "haunting". Todd McCarthy of The Hollywood Reporter wrote "The soundtrack has a similar lively eclecticism."

== Track listing ==
Lost River track listing
No.	Title	Artist(s)	Length
1.	"Tell Me"	Saoirse Ronan	2:42
2.	"Yes" (Love Theme from Lost River)	Chromatics	3:24
3.	"Shell Game"	Glass Candy	3:07
4.	"Echoes"		2:27
5.	"The Big Bad Wolf"	Rob Zabrecky	0:47
6.	"Cool Water"	Ben Mendelsohn	3:11
7.	"Deep Purple"	Billy Ward and his Dominoes	2:15
8.	"Bullytown"	Matt Smith	0:50
9.	"The Dead Zone"		6:47
10.	"Blue Moon"	Chromatics	3:37
11.	"A Bloody Good Time"	Eva Mendes; Landyn Stewart	2:59
12.	"Behind the Mask"	Desire	2:27
13.	"Underwater"		3:53
14.	"Barnum's Steam Calliope"	Sunset Four; Matt Smith	0:47
15.	"Carousel"		2:22
16.	"Hope"		1:13
17.	"Yes" (Symmetry Remix)	Chromatics	4:31
18.	"Deep Purple"	Larry Clinton; Mary Dugan	2:22
19.	"The Goddess of Gore"	Rob Zabrecky	1:09
20.	"Moliendo Café"	Lucho Gatica	2:00
21.	"Echoes" (Reprise)		1:29
22.	"Ascension"		3:13
23.	"Spellbound"		4:17
24.	"Burning Houses"	Reda Kateb	1:59
25.	"Tell Me" (Jukebox Version)		3:01
26.	"Slow Motion"		3:19
27.	"Communion"	Rob Zabrecky	2:27
28.	"Carousel Pt. 2"		2:09
29.	"Wandering"		1:02
30.	"Deep Purple" (Reprise)	Larry Clinton	1:03
31.	"Reunion"		1:43
32.	"Death"		1:59
33.	"Rat, Face & Bully"	Saoirse Ronan; Matt Smith	1:27
34.	"Candlelight Burns"		2:48
35.	"Fossil Fuels"		4:32
36.	"Franky's Theme"		1:48
37.	"Yes" (Lullaby from Lost River)	Chromatics	2:37
Total length:			93:43
