= Ruth Radelet =

American singer, songwriter and musician (born 1982)

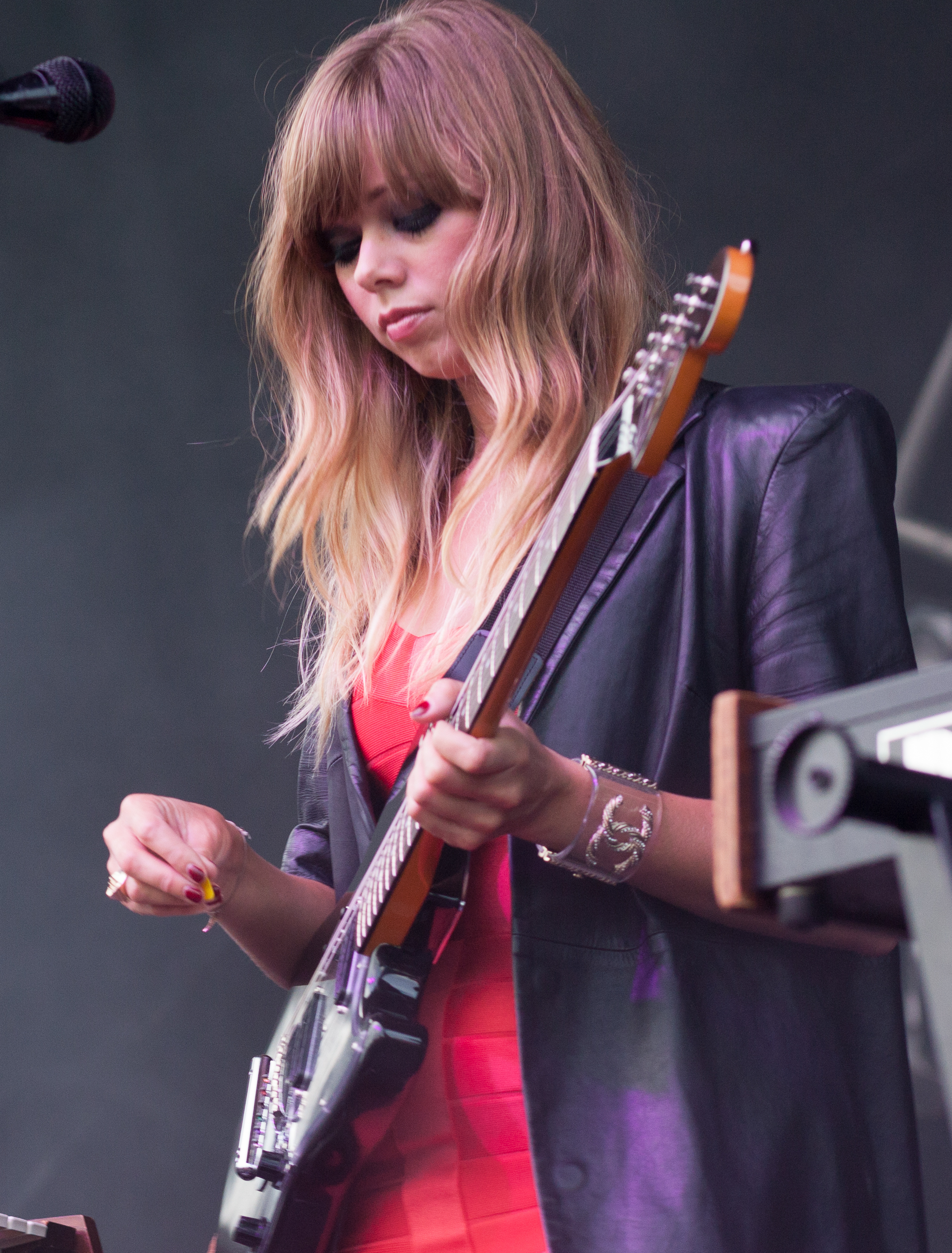
- Radelet in 2013

Background information
- Born: April 28, 1982 (age 44); Portland, Oregon, U.S.
- Genre: Dream pop
- Occupations: Singer; songwriter; musician
- Instruments: Vocals; guitar; synthesizer
- Years active: 2006–present
- Label: Italians Do It Better (2006–2021)
- Formerly of: Chromatics

Ruth Radelet (/ˈrædəleɪ/, born April 28, 1982) is an American singer, songwriter and musician. She is best known for her work as the lead vocalist in the electronic band Chromatics, formed in 2001. A native of Portland, Oregon, Radelet joined Chromatics in 2006 after the band relocated to Portland from Seattle, Washington. The band's first album to feature Radelet as vocalist and guitarist was their cult release Night Drive (2007), the record which marked a notable shift in their sound, incorporating elements of synth pop and post punk.

Radelet appeared with Chromatics in the Showtime series revival of Twin Peaks (2017).

In 2020, Ruth Radelet sang on the Chromatics remix of "Blinding Lights" by The Weeknd. Additionally, in 2022, at Coachella Valley Music and Arts Festival, it was revealed that The Weeknd used a sample of Radelet's voice while playing live.

After Chromatics disbanded in 2021, Radelet released her debut solo EP “The Other Side,” listed as #9 in Gorilla vs. Bear’s top 30 EPs of 2022. She has released multiple singles, collaborated with numerous other artists, and most recently contributed to the Lost Records: Bloom & Rage original game soundtrack, along with former bandmates Adam Miller and Nat Walker.

== Early life ==
Radelet was born and raised in Portland, Oregon along with her two sisters, Sarah and Sofya.

== Career ==
Radelet joined Chromatics in 2006 with Adam Miller, Nat Walker, and Johnny Jewel, releasing Night Drive in 2007. Radelet provided contributions to Symmetry's debut album, Themes for an Imaginary Film (2011). Chromatics' follow-up album to Night Drive was Kill for Love, released the following year. The band was invited to perform at the Chanel show by Karl Lagerfeld in 2012.

Radelet appeared with Chromatics in the Showtime 2017 revival of Twin Peaks. After the disbandment of Chromatics in 2021, Radelet launched a solo career, releasing her debut EP The Other Side in 2022, which was produced by Filip Nikolic, formerly of Poolside.

In 2025 Radelet contributed several songs to Lost Records: Bloom & Rage, in collaboration with former bandmates Adam Miller and Nat Walker.

== Influences ==
Radelet has cited songwriters Bob Dylan and Tom Waits as influences, along with artists such as Beach House and Frank Ocean.

== Personal life ==
Ruth relocated to New York from Portland in 2011, and to Los Angeles in 2015.

== Works ==
=== Extended plays ===
- The Other Side (2022), self-released

=== Singles ===
- "Twilight" (2021), an Elliott Smith cover featured on the 30th anniversary compilation of Kill Rock Stars
- "Crimes" (2022), self-released
- "Stranger" (2022), self-released
- "Leaving the Table" (2023), Leonard Cohen cover, self-released
- "Shoot Me Down" (2023), self-released
- "The Wild Unknown" (2025), Kid Katana Records
- "Dreamers" (2025), Kid Katana Records
- "The Veil" (2025), Kid Katana Records

=== Filmography ===
Year	Title	Role	Notes
2017	Twin Peaks	Herself	Episodes: "Part 2", "Part 12", "Part 17"
