= Bottin =

Italian musician (born 1977)

BOTTIN
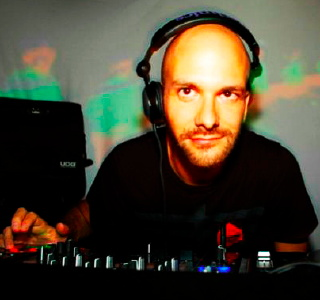
- Bottin DJing at Neon Party in Brasil in 2010.

Background information
- Also known as: Bottin
- Born: Guglielmo Bottin; 1977 (age 48–49); Padua, Italy
- Origin: Venice, Italy
- Genres: Electronica, Nu Disco, Cosmic Disco, Italo disco
- Occupation: Music producer
- Instruments: Keyboards, guitar, trumpet
- Labels: Italians Do It Better, Eskimo Recordings, Bear Funk, 2MR, Artifact
- Website: bottin.it

Guglielmo Bottin (born 1977) is an Italian composer, producer, DJ and music scholar better known as BOTTIN. He is based in Venice, Italy.

His tracks have a clear italo disco and retro-futurist electronic music influences. Before moving to contemporary space disco, he was signed to Italians Do It Better by Johnny Jewel via MySpace in 2008. Bottin was also part of the early synthwave scene playing at Valerie Collective parties and producing remixes for Jupiter.

In 2009 he released Horror Disco, a concept album that fused nu disco, cosmic disco and Italian giallo movies soundtracks. In 2014, he collaborated with Steve Strange and Visage on the song Poison Within. Bottin recently contributed to the soundtrack of Mona Lisa and the Blood Moon by Ana Lily Amirpour.

== Academic work ==
Bottin holds a PhD from the University of Milan; he did his doctoral thesis on groove in popular electronic music. He is an adjunct professor at the University of Milan. He was previously a postdoctoral research fellow at the University of Bologna and a visiting researcher at Humboldt University of Berlin. His research focuses on the history of electronic dance music, including italo disco, and on groove and rhythm technologies.

His publications include the article "Historical Emergence and Current Uses of the Term italodisco" in Dancecult: Journal of Electronic Dance Music Culture and the chapter "The Origins of Italodisco" in The Oxford Handbook of Pop Music (Oxford University Press, 2026).

=== Selected publications ===
- Bottin, Guglielmo (2026). "Y'All Want This Party Started, Right? The History of a House Music "Unclassic"". In Mann, F.; Edgar, R.; Pleasance, H. (eds.). Turntable Stories: Narratives, Memories, and Histories from In-Between the Grooves. Bristol: Equinox. pp. 177–193.
- Bottin, Guglielmo (2026). "The Origins of Italodisco". In Weisbard, Eric (ed.). The Oxford Handbook of Pop Music (1st ed.). New York: Oxford University Press. pp. 321–338. doi:10.1093/9780197760284.003.0016.
- Bottin, Guglielmo (2026). "Problèmes d'Amour: Alexander Robotnick's Italian post-disco anomaly". In Stahl, G.; Zuberi, N.; Kruse, H. (eds.). Just Can't Get Enough: Synth-Pop and Its Repercussions. Bloomsbury. pp. 253–266.
- Bottin, Guglielmo (2026). Groove. Teorie ed estetiche del ritmo nella popular music (in Italian). Milan: Milano University Press. doi:10.54103/grain.406.
- Bottin, Guglielmo (2025). "Singing the Script: le filastrocche iperdiegetiche di Ennio Morricone". Comunicazioni sociali (in Italian) (1): 122–134. doi:10.26350/001200_000227.
- Bottin, Guglielmo (2025). "Historical Emergence and Current Uses of the Term italodisco". Dancecult. 17 (1). doi:10.12801/1947-5403.2025.17.01.08.
- Bottin, Guglielmo (2025). "Chiara Fumai Presents Nico Fumai: Italodisco as Audiovisual Performative Fiction". Imago. 30: 75–95. doi:10.5281/zenodo.18289733.
- Bottin, Guglielmo (2024). "Slashing the tape. Cuts and edits in Morricone's music for Who saw her die?". L'avventura. International Journal of Italian Film and Media Landscapes. 2024 (1): 29–58. doi:10.17397/113917.
- Bottin, Guglielmo (2023). "The disappearance of musical futures? Multiple temporalities and sonic anachronisms in "new" music". Mosaic. An Interdisciplinary Critical Journal. 56 (2): 125–142.
- Bottin, Guglielmo (2023). "EDM theory and fiction: The conceptual dimension of musical waves. Conversation with Steve Goodman/Kode9". Sound Stage Screen. 3 (2): 131–156. doi:10.54103/sss24028.

== Discography ==
Compiled from the artist's official discography.

=== Albums ===
- Who Is Magou? (as Magou; 2022, Toytonics)
- Quality Time (as Quality Time; 2021, Lacerba)
- I Have What I Gave (2017, 2MR)
- Cristalli Liquidi (as Cristalli Liquidi; 2017, Bordello A Parigi)
- Deardrums (as Deardrums; 2016, 2MR)
- Punica Fides (2014, Bear Funk)
- Jabberwock (as Tinpong; 2012, Nang)
- Discoursive Diversions (2010, Nang)
- Horror Disco (2009, Bear Funk)
- I Love Me Vol. I (with Lucio Dalla; 2004)
- Chill Reception (as Bluecat; 2002, Irma)

=== Singles and EPs ===
- Rosso Carnale (as Cristalli Liquidi, with Deux Control; 2023, Artifact)
- Lunedì Cinema (with Lucio Dalla; 2022, Archeo Recordings)
- Eye-BM (2022, Slow Motion)
- Per Una Bambola (with Diva; 2022, BDC / Artifact)
- Love Life / Delta Tigre (with Francisco and Fernando; 2021, Artifact)
- More Dreams (as Magou; 2021, Artifact)
- Three Essays in Dance Music (as Magou; 2020, Artifact)
- Ragazza / Madre (as Cristalli Liquidi; 2020, Lacerba)
- Dreams (as Magou; 2020, Toytonics)
- Respiraré / Waterland (2019, Artifact)
- Ecco I Remix (as Cristalli Liquidi; 2018, Bordello A Parigi)
- Arreboles (2017, Chit Chat)
- Y.A.M.L. (2017, 2MR)
- Q.I.L.D.E. (as Cristalli Liquidi, with Polosid; 2017, Artifact)
- Dum Dum / Mami Wata / Darkness (as Deardrums; 2016, 2MR)
- Sciame (as Cristalli Liquidi; 2016, Artifact)
- Aquila / Mayan Machine (as Deardrums; 2016, 2MR)
- Parade / Robottin (with Alexander Robotnick; 2015, Hot Elephant)
- Acid Disco (2015, Slow Motion)
- Parody / Progresso (2015, Bear Funk)
- Incubo Assoluto (as Cristalli Liquidi; 2014, Artifact)
- Canzone Registrata (as Cristalli Liquidi; 2013, Artifact)
- Plastic (2013, Tin)
- One For All (with Rodion; 2013, Tin)
- Dirty (2012, Tin)
- Lust (2012, Tin)
- Volevi Una Hit (as Cristalli Liquidi; 2012, Artifact)
- Sage Comme Une Image (with Jupiter; 2012, Z Records)
- Atzaro (with Egan and Kõhncke; 2011, Blitz Club)
- Shooting Star (with Rodion; 2011, Nang)
- Jabberwock EP (as Tinpong; 2011, Nang)
- Space / Zombie Erotic (with Francisco and Rodion; 2011, Eskimo)
- Discocracy Revisited (2011, Eskimo)
- Galli / Piazza Venezia (with Rodion; 2010, Eskimo)
- Red Onions (2010, Gomma)
- Theme From V (2010, Nang)
- Discocracy / August (2010, Eskimo)
- Hot Ring (with Stevie Kotey; 2010, Bear Funk)
- Robots Are Un-American (with Solange; 2010, Italians Do It Better)
- New Religion (as Tinpong; 2010, Nang)
- No Static (2009, Italians Do It Better)
- Horror Disco Sampler (2009, Bear Funk)
- Disco For The Devil (2009, Bear Funk)
- Fondamente Nove (2008, Eskimo)
- Playing Hard To Get (as Bluecat; 2002, Irma)
- Good Morning Sunshine (as Bluecat; 1999, Irma)

=== Remixes ===
- Krisma and Minox: "I Want You" (2024, Lacerba)
- Alexander Robotnick and Cocco Cantini: "Robocok" (2024, Hot Elephant)
- Kavemura: "Cathay" (2023, Yuen Yuen)
- International Dateline: "Come With Us" (2023, IDL)
- Club Soda: "Basso e Batteria" (2023, Flexi Cuts)
- Diva: "Per Una Bambola" (2021, BonBon)
- Alessandro Mendini: "Extrasussurrante" (2019, Lacerba)
- Ichisan: "Space Patrol" (2019, Kanto)
- NDT: "Warm Leatherette" (2018, We Don't Play Guitars)
- Soundersons: "Can't Get Enough" (2017, Paper)
- Pete Herbert: "No Big Thing" (2017, Riot Gear)
- Tulioxi: "Apollo 409" (2017, Hot Elephant)
- Rimini Sunset: "Sunrise" (2016, Lebensfreude)
- Frank Agrario: "Thrun Dha Tha" (2016, Micronation)
- Museum of Love: "In Infancy" (2015, DFA)
- World's End Press: "Tall Stories" (2015, Liberation)
- Arveene and Misk: "Don't Stop" (2014, Animal Language)
- Visage: "Never Enough" (2014, Blitz Club)
- Oy: "Akwaba" (2014, Creaked)
- Data: "Soldier's Flag" (2014, Ekler'O'Shock)
- Elitechnique: "Bizarre Love Triangle" (2014, Clone)
- Spiller featuring Nina Miranda: "Urastar" (2013, Nano)
- Andre VII: "Discoteca Clandestina" (2012, Electrique)
- Martin Brodin: "Agogo" (2012, MB Disco)
- Nassau: "Errol Flynn" (2011, TBM)
- Ichisan: "Tiny House" (2011, Labour of Love)
- Blood Orange: "Complete Knock" (2011, Domino)
- Miss Plug Inn: "Chanson" (2011, Cocktail D'Amore)
- Clio (with Roberto Dimovi): "Eyes" (2011, Clone)
- Tuccillo and Patty Pravo: "Bambola" (2011, Vendetta)
- Time & Space Machine: "Set Phasers To Stun" (2010, Tirk)
- Philippos N.: "Stealth" (2010, Freshit)
- Solarstone: "Electric Love" (2010, Solaris)
- Lindstrøm: "Paaskelyd" (2010, Bear Funk)
- Sally Shapiro: "Fantasy" (2010, Permanent Vacation)
- Telonius: "Hit Me With Your Rhythm" (2010, Gomma)
- King DJ: "Escape From New York" (2010, Nang)
- In Flagranti: "Ex Ex Ex" (2010, Codek)
- Ali Love: "Smoke and Mirrors" (2009, Backyard)
- Pollyn: "I Can't Get into It" (2009, Pollyn)
- Lost Valentinos: "Nightmoves" (2009, Ministry / EtcEtc)
- Space: "Carry On Turn Me On" (2009, Nang)
- Space: "Tango in Space" (2009, Nang)
- Oscar G and Stryke: "Hypnotized" (2009, Hooj Choones)
- Solange: "Robots Are Dub-American" (2009, Italians Do It Better)
- Tosca: "Elektra Bregenz" (2009, G-Stone)
- Jupiter: "Starlighter" (2009, ESR / La Main)
- The Emergency: "Fantasy" (2009, Metal Postcard)
- Wax Stag: "And How" (2009, People In The Sky)
- Codebreaker: "Follow Me" (2009, Disco Demolition)
- Miss Plug Inn: "Zodiac" (2007, Music Control)
- Rettore: "Splendido Splendente" (2005, Novunque)
- Sergio Caputo: "Non Bevo Più Tequila" (2004, Idiosyncracy)

== Installations ==
- House of Gonzaga: La Celeste Galeria (Palazzo Te, Mantua, 2002)
- Tazio Nuvolari: Tra la Terra e il Cielo (Palazzo Te, Mantua, 2003)
- From Chaos to Order and Back: an exhibition by Fabrica (GGG, Osaka)
- Venice Biennale 2005, Spanish Pavilion by Antoni Muntadas
- Speak Truth to Power – Italian adaptation (2004, 2006)
- Sciame 1, with Francesco Meneghini – Daydream Fields (Replay Foundation, 2008) finalist at Share Prize 2009, Turin
- Endings, with Marina Apollonio (2024, Peggy Guggenheim Collection, Venice)
- Endings: Nightclub, video with Marina Apollonio (2025; screened at the Su Xiaobai Foundation, Palazzo Soranzo van Axel, Venice, 2026)
