= After Dark 2 =

Compilation album by various artists
- Released: May 17, 2013
- Recorded: 2012
- Genres: Synth-pop; disco; Italo disco; synthwave
- Length: 78:27
- Label: Italians Do It Better
- Producer: Johnny Jewel

After Dark chronology
| After Dark (2007) | After Dark 2 (2013) | After Dark 3 (2020) |

Professional ratings
Aggregate scores
| Source | Rating |
|---|---|
| Metacritic | 83/100 |
Review scores
| Source | Rating |
| AllMusic | 4/5 stars |
| NME | 8/10 |
| Paste | 8.5/10 |
| Pitchfork | 8.3/10 |
| PopMatters | 8/10 |

After Dark 2 is a compilation album featuring artists from the Italians Do It Better label. The album was released on May 17, 2013, and produced by Johnny Jewel. It is a sequel to the 2007 album After Dark. Artists and bands featured on the album include Glass Candy, Desire, Chromatics, Mirage, Appaloosa, Symmetry, Twisted Wires, Farah, and Mike Simonetti.

== Track listing ==
| No. | Title | Writer(s) | Performer(s) | Length |
|---|---|---|---|---|
| 1. | "Warm in the Winter" | Ida No; John David V | Glass Candy | 6:44 |
| 2. | "Tears from Heaven" | V | Desire | 5:11 |
| 3. | "Let's Kiss" | V | Mirage | 9:05 |
| 4. | "Fill the Blanks" | Anne-Laure Keib; Max Krefeld; V | Appaloosa | 3:53 |
| 5. | "Looking for Love" | V | Chromatics | 5:31 |
| 6. | "Heart of Darkness" | Nat Walker; V | Symmetry | 3:57 |
| 7. | "Camera" | Adam Miller; V | Chromatics | 4:32 |
| 8. | "Half Lives" | Richard Durham; V | Twisted Wires | 4:38 |
| 9. | "The Possessed" | Ida No; V | Glass Candy | 5:49 |
| 10. | "Cherry" | Miller; V | Chromatics | 4:32 |
| 11. | "Beautiful Object" | Ida No; V | Glass Candy | 5:03 |
| 12. | "Into Eternity" | Farah Holly; V | Farah | 5:23 |
| 13. | "Intimate" | Keib; Krefeld; V | Appaloosa | 5:03 |
| 14. | "The Magician" | Mike Simonetti; V | Mike Simonetti | 3:59 |
| 15. | "Redheads Feel More Pain" | Ida No; V | Glass Candy | 5:07 |
