= Kill for Love =

2012 studio album by Chromatics

Studio album by Chromatics
- Released: March 26, 2012
- Recorded: May 2007 – August 2011 (Houston), (Portland), (Montreal)
- Genres: Synth-pop; synth-rock; dream pop; indie rock
- Length: 77:33
- Label: Italians Do It Better
- Producer: Johnny Jewel

Chromatics chronology
| Night Drive (2007) | Kill for Love (2012) | Closer to Grey (2019) |

Singles from Kill for Love
- 1. "These Streets Will Never Look the Same" Released: June 23, 2013

Kill for Love is the fourth studio album by American electronic music band Chromatics. It was released on March 26, 2012, by Italians Do It Better. On May 7, 2012, a drumless version of the album, containing 11 songs with no percussion, was made available by the band for free download.

== Critical reception ==
Professional ratings
Aggregate scores
| Source | Rating |
|---|---|
| AnyDecentMusic? | 8.2/10 |
| Metacritic | 80/100 |
Review scores
| Source | Rating |
| AllMusic | 5/5 stars |
| The A.V. Club | C+ |
| The Boston Phoenix | 3.5/4 stars |
| Consequence of Sound | 4.5/5 stars |
| Drowned in Sound | 9/10 |
| NME | 7/10 |
| Pitchfork | 8.7/10 |
| PopMatters | 8/10 |
| Slant Magazine | 4/5 stars |
| Spin | 8/10 |

Kill for Love received critical acclaim from music critics. At Metacritic, which assigns a normalized rating out of 100 to reviews from mainstream publications, the album received an average score of 80, based on 18 reviews. AllMusic critic K. Ross Hoffman wrote that the album "maintains an impressively high level of quality and emotional resonance throughout", adding that "just about everything" on the album is "inarguably effective, and starkly beautiful in its simplicity". Drowned in Sound's Sean Adams praised its "scale and ambition" and dubbed it "a modern masterpiece", while BBC Music's Alex Denney named it "one of the finest records to surface this year". Jesse Cataldo of Slant Magazine viewed Kill for Love as "a great tribute to the grueling power of fatigue, an album that turns a dearth of ideas into a virtue."

Marc Hogan of Pitchfork commented that the album "boasts some of the most engrossing synth-pop songs so far this year", adding that "[i]t's not just a collection of hits; it's an album, one that gives the project's familiar nocturnal foreboding a new sense of grandeur." Austin Trunick of Under the Radar noted its "meticulously well thought-out" sequencing and remarked that it "feels less like an album and more like a feature film." Now's Benjamin Boles called the album "strikingly epic" and concluded that "as a more condensed pop album it could also be a strong statement, but the languid pacing and excess of empty space make the perfect frame for the singalongs." In a mixed review, Eric Harvey of The A.V. Club dubbed Kill for Love an "ambitious work", but felt that "the tracks blend together into a flat, echo-drenched concoction of Radelet's blank Nico croon", concluding that "it's probably worth just waiting for the movie [Drive]."

=== Accolades ===
| Publication | Accolade | Rank | Ref. |
|---|---|---|---|
| The 405 | Albums of the Year | 22 | |
| AllMusic | Best of 2012 | 28 | |
| AllMusic | Decade in Review | Unranked | |
| BBC Music | Top 25 Albums of 2012 | 18 | |
| Beats Per Minute | The Top 50 Albums of 2012 | 2 | |
| Clash | The Top 40 Albums of 2012 | 29 | |
| Clash | The Top 100 Albums of Clash's Lifetime | 81 | |
| Cokemachineglow | Top 50 Albums 2012 | 17 | |
| Consequence of Sound | Top 50 Albums of 2012 | 21 | |
| Consequence of Sound | Top 100 Albums of the 2010s | 60 | |
| Crack Magazine | The Top 100 Albums of 2012 | 27 | |
| DIY | Albums of 2012 | 14 | |
| Drowned in Sound | Favourite Albums of 2012 | 3 | |
| Exclaim! | Best Albums of 2012 | 21 | |
| Filter | Top 10 of 2012 | 16 | |
| Gorilla vs. Bear | Albums of 2012 | 1 | |
| Gorilla vs. Bear | Albums of the Decade (2010–2019) | 8 | |
| The Guardian | Best Albums of 2012 | 13 | |
| The Guardian | The 100 Best Albums of the 21st Century | 85 | |
| The Line of Best Fit | The Best Fit Fifty: Albums of 2012 | 47 | |
| musicOMH | Top 100 Albums of 2012 | 4 | |
| No Ripcord | Top 50 Albums Of 2012 | 28 | |
| Obscure Sound | Best Albums of 2012 | 17 | |
| Pitchfork | The Top 50 Albums of 2012 | 8 | |
| Pitchfork | The 100 Best Albums of the Decade So Far (2010–2014) | 44 | |
| Pitchfork | The 30 Best Dream Pop Albums | 13 | |
| Pitchfork | The 200 Best Albums of the 2010s | 101 | |
| PopMatters | The 75 Best Albums of 2012 | 10 | |
| PopMatters | The Best Indie Rock of 2012 | 1 | |
| Pretty Much Amazing | Best Albums of 2012 | 7 | |
| The Quietus | Albums of the Year 2012 | 41 | |
| Slant Magazine | The 25 Best Albums of 2012 | 6 | |
| Slant Magazine | The 100 Best Albums of the 2010s | 16 | |
| Stereogum | Top 50 Albums of 2012 | 14 | |
| Treble | Top 50 Albums of 2012 | 2 | |
| Under the Radar | Top 100 Albums of 2012 | 12 | |
| Uproxx | All The Best Albums of the 2010s | 40 | |
| The Village Voice | Pazz & Jop | 28 | |

== Track listing ==
| No. | Title | Writer(s) | Length |
|---|---|---|---|
| 1. | "Into the Black" (Neil Young cover) | Neil Young | 5:23 |
| 2. | "Kill for Love" | Adam Miller; John David V | 3:58 |
| 3. | "Back from the Grave" | V | 3:43 |
| 4. | "The Page" | Miller; Ruth Radelet; V | 3:36 |
| 5. | "Lady" | V | 5:08 |
| 6. | "These Streets Will Never Look the Same" | Miller; V | 8:37 |
| 7. | "Broken Mirrors" | Nat Walker; V | 7:03 |
| 8. | "Candy" | Miller; V | 2:30 |
| 9. | "The Eleventh Hour" | V | 3:28 |
| 10. | "Running from the Sun" | Miller; V | 7:07 |
| 11. | "Dust to Dust" | Miller; V | 2:41 |
| 12. | "Birds of Paradise" | Miller; Radelet; V | 4:26 |
| 13. | "A Matter of Time" | V | 5:06 |
| 14. | "At Your Door" | Miller; V | 3:53 |
| 15. | "There's a Light Out on the Horizon" | Walker; V | 4:44 |
| 16. | "The River" | Miller; V | 6:10 |
| Total length: | | | 77:33 |

Digital edition and limited-edition vinyl bonus track
| No. | Title | Writer(s) | Length |
|---|---|---|---|
| 17. | "No Escape" | V | 14:00 |
| Total length: | | | 91:33 |

2017 digital deluxe edition bonus instrumentals
| No. | Title | Length |
|---|---|---|
| 18. | "Into the Black" | 5:27 |
| 19. | "Kill for Love" | 3:57 |
| 20. | "Back from the Grave" | 3:48 |
| 21. | "The Page" | 3:40 |
| 22. | "Lady" | 5:08 |
| 23. | "These Streets Will Never Look the Same" | 8:43 |
| 24. | "Candy" | 2:29 |
| 25. | "A Matter of Time" | 5:07 |
| 26. | "At Your Door" | 3:53 |
| 27. | "There's a Light Out on the Horizon" | 4:44 |
| 28. | "The River" | 6:07 |
| Total length: | | 144:36 |

Drumless version
| No. | Title | Length |
|---|---|---|
| 1. | "The Page" | 3:32 |
| 2. | "These Streets Will Never Look the Same" | 8:37 |
| 3. | "Lady" | 5:08 |
| 4. | "Kill for Love" | 3:57 |
| 5. | "At Your Door" | 3:53 |
| 6. | "Back from the Grave" | 3:43 |
| 7. | "A Matter of Time" | 4:33 |
| 8. | "Candy" | 2:31 |
| 9. | "The River" | 5:37 |
| 10. | "There's a Light Out on the Horizon" | 4:47 |
| 11. | "Into the Black" | 5:22 |
| Total length: | | 51:40 |

== Charts ==
| Chart (2012) | Peak position |
|---|---|
| Belgian Albums (Ultratop Flanders) | 67 |
| Belgian Alternative Albums (Ultratop Flanders) | 32 |
| Dutch Albums (Album Top 100) | 93 |
| Norwegian Albums (VG-lista) | 27 |
| US Heatseekers Albums (Billboard) | 4 |
| US Independent Albums (Billboard) | 42 |
| US Top Dance Albums (Billboard) | 11 |
