= Don't Call =

Don't Call may refer to:

- "Don't Call", a 2009 song by Desire from II
- "Don't Call", a 2017 song by Lost Kings
