= On the Wall =

On the Wall may refer to:

- "On the Wall", a 1987 song by The Jesus and Mary Chain from their album Darklands, covered in 2019 by Chromatics for their album Closer to Grey
- "On the Wall", a 2010 song by Brisco featuring Lil Wayne
