= Night Drive (album) =

Studio album by Chromatics
- Released: August 28, 2007
- Recorded: Summer 2007
- Studio: Suite 304 (Portland, Oregon)
- Genres: Synth-pop, synthwave, dream pop, Italo disco
- Length: 58:04 (Original); 79:32 (Deluxe Edition)
- Label: Italians Do It Better
- Producer: Johnny Jewel

Chromatics chronology
| Plaster Hounds (2004) | Night Drive (2007) | Kill for Love (2012) |

Deluxe Edition Cover

Night Drive (alternatively known as Original Motion Picture Soundtrack IV) is the third studio album by Chromatics, released on August 28, 2007 on the Italians Do It Better record label. The label reissued an analogue remaster of the album as a "Deluxe Edition" in 2010, on both CD and double LP formats. A limited print run of the double LP was pressed on colored vinyl: blue for Sides A and B, and red for Sides C and D. The "Deluxe Edition" restores five tracks that had originally constituted Side D of the album, but had been scrapped before the original 2007 release date due to technical problems and time constraints.

With this album, Chromatics made a drastic departure from their previously punk sound, as they pursued a new direction reminiscent of Italo disco. It is the first full-length Chromatics album to feature singer Ruth Radelet and drummer Nat Walker. Guitarist Adam Miller and multi-instrumentalist Johnny Jewel had been featured on the band's previous LPs.

== Musical content ==
The album's title may be a reference to a 1985 single ("Night Drive"/"Time Space Transmat") by Detroit techno pioneer Juan Atkins.

Opening track "The Telephone Call" contains samples from "Lady Operator" by Mirage and from Chromatics' own tracks "The Killing Spree" and "Let's Make This A Moment To Remember." It sketches out a plot involving a female protagonist who, after spending an evening at a nightclub, is about to drive home to meet her boyfriend. It ends with a sample of a car driving off, and then segues into the title track. Accordingly, these opening two tracks, along with album closer "Accelerator," suggest that the album may be a concept album about a late night drive.

The words of "I Want Your Love" contain a reference to the song "96 Tears" by ? & The Mysterians.

"Running Up that Hill" is a cover version of the first track from Kate Bush's 1985 album, Hounds of Love.

The guitar solo in "Healer" contains a musical quotation from Joy Division's "Shadowplay," from their 1979 album, Unknown Pleasures.

Album closer "Accelerator" contains an interpolation of chords from the album's title track.

"Tick of the Clock" has been used in numerous Hollywood films, including Drive and Taken 2. It has been licensed for commercial usage in ad campaigns for National Geographic, AIDS awareness, Miss America, Major League Baseball, HTC, Fox Sports, and many others. It was also featured in some of the numerous betas of "Need for Speed: Most Wanted (2012)"

== Reception ==
Professional ratings
Review scores
| Source | Rating |
|---|---|
| AllMusic | 4/5 stars |
| The Boston Phoenix | 3/4 stars |
| Mojo | 4/5 stars |
| Now | 5/5 |
| Pitchfork | 8.3/10 |
| Resident Advisor | 4.0/5 |
| Spin | 4/5 stars |
| Stylus Magazine | C+ |
| Uncut | 3/5 stars |

In a review for AllMusic, K. Ross Hoffman praised how Night Drive "evokes widescreen opulence with a sonic palette that extends beyond the bedrock of synths, guitars, and drum machines to include touches of organ, strings, flutes, and so on, but it's always used sparingly, rarely outstepping the group's meticulously minimal, carefully controlled arrangements". A negative review by Nina Phillips in Stylus Magazine called the album "poorly produced," criticized "Tomorrow Is So Far Away" for its repetitive structure, and cited "Tick of the Clock" as a "conceptual failure".

Andrew Graham, writing for The Boston Phoenix, praised the 2010 remastered and expanded version of the album, calling "Circled Sun" a "newly unearthed gem" and stating that "In less capable hands, Night Drive's parts might blur together into a soporific whole, but Chromatics don't let the production dominate".

== Track listing ==
| No. | Title | Length |
|---|---|---|
| 1. | "The Telephone Call" | 1:51 |
| 2. | "Night Drive" | 3:44 |
| 3. | "I Want Your Love" | 6:41 |
| 4. | "Running Up That Hill" (Kate Bush cover) | 6:07 |
| 5. | "Killing Spree (Instrumental)" | 3:58 |
| 6. | "Healer" | 3:53 |
| 7. | "Mask" | 5:35 |
| 8. | "Tomorrow is So Far Away" | 7:06 |
| 9. | "Let's Make This a Moment to Remember (Instrumental)" | 3:30 |
| 10. | "Tick of the Clock (Instrumental)" | 15:39 |

Deluxe Edition Tracks
| No. | Title | Length |
|---|---|---|
| 11. | "Shining Violence (Instrumental)" | 3:16 |
| 12. | "Circled Sun" | 4:07 |
| 13. | "Bell" | 2:37 |
| 14. | "The Gemini" | 4:00 |
| 15. | "Accelerator (Instrumental)" | 7:28 |

== Personnel ==
- Johnny Jewel – programming, production, mixing, artwork, writer (tracks 1–3, 5–15)
- Adam Miller – guitar, artwork, writer (tracks 2, 3, 6, 7)
- Ruth Radelet – vocals
- Nat Walker – drums
