= Closer to Grey =

Studio album by Chromatics
- Released: October 2, 2019
- Recorded: Los Angeles, 2014-2019
- Genres: Synth-pop, dream pop, synthwave
- Length: 45:46
- Label: Italians Do It Better
- Producer: Johnny Jewel

Chromatics chronology
Kill for Love (2012)	Closer to Grey (2019)

Singles from Closer to Grey
- 1. "The Sound of Silence" Released: December 13, 2019; 2. "I Want to Be Alone" Released: 2019; 3. "You're No Good" Released: 2019

Professional ratings
Aggregate scores
Source	Rating
Metacritic	79/100
Review scores
Source	Rating
AllMusic	3.5/5 stars
Clash	9/10
Consequence of Sound	B
Exclaim!	8/10
The Guardian	3/5 stars
The Line of Best Fit	8.5/10
MusicOMH	4.5/5 stars
Paste	8.4/10
Pitchfork	7.1/10
Slant Magazine	4/5 stars

Closer to Grey is the sixth (chronologically seventh) and final studio album by American electronic music band Chromatics, released through Italians Do It Better without prior announcement on October 2, 2019. It is their first album in seven years, and follows the continuing delay of Dear Tommy, originally teased in 2014. On March 31, 2020, the band released a companion album titled Faded Now which included remixes from Closer to Grey, as well as covers and new material. All the tracks that compose this double feature are included in the deluxe edition of Closer to Grey, as well as instrumental and a cappella versions of some songs.

== Background ==
The title track, "Closer to Grey", was released in 2014 through Johnny Jewel's SoundCloud. The first track, "The Sound of Silence", is a cover of the Simon & Garfunkel song. The tenth track, "On the Wall", is a cover of The Jesus and Mary Chain song. The cover of the record represents Closer to Grey as the seventh Chromatics album, turning Dear Tommy (the would-be sixth unreleased album) into a "lost" record.

== Track listing ==
All tracks written by Adam Miller and Johnny Jewel, except noted.

Closer to Grey – standard edition
No.	Title	Length
1.	"The Sound of Silence" (Simon & Garfunkel cover)	3:16
2.	"You're No Good"	4:52
3.	"Closer to Grey"	2:44
4.	"Twist the Knife"	3:27
5.	"Light as a Feather"	3:36
6.	"Move a Mountain"	3:12
7.	"Touch Red"	5:12
8.	"Through the Looking Glass"	1:42
9.	"Whispers in the Hall"	3:24
10.	"On the Wall" (The Jesus and Mary Chain cover)	8:21
11.	"Love Theme from Closer to Grey"	2:40
12.	"Wishing Well"	3:20
Total length:		45:46

Closer to Grey – deluxe edition
No.	Title	Length
13.	"Faded Now" (alternate version of "Closer to Grey")	3:54
14.	"You're No Good" (Club Mix)	7:47
15.	"Twist the Knife" (8 Track Version)	3:19
16.	"Street Lights" (alternate version of "Light as a Feather")	3:06
17.	"I Want to Be Alone" (Jackson C. Frank cover)	3:46
18.	"Touch Red" (On Film)	4:01
19.	"Nocturne"	2:13
20.	"Wishing Well" (alternate version)	2:36
21.	"The Runner"	3:25
22.	"Burning Bridges"	1:55
23.	"Stiff as a Board"	4:18
24.	"The Sound of Silence" (On Film)	2:51
25.	"Bloody Mary"	1:06
26.	"Move a Mountain" (On Film)	3:14
Total length:		93:08

Closer to Grey – deluxe edition part II
No.	Title	Length
27.	"The Sound of Silence" (Instrumental)	3:17
28.	"You're No Good" (Instrumental)	4:56
29.	"Closer to Grey" (Instrumental)	2:46
30.	"Twist the Knife" (Instrumental)	3:29
31.	"Light as a Feather" (Instrumental)	3:37
32.	"Move a Mountain" (Instrumental)	3:14
33.	"Touch Red" (Instrumental)	5:15
34.	"Whispers in the Hall" (Instrumental)	3:32
35.	"On the Wall" (Instrumental)	8:24
36.	"Wishing Well" (Instrumental)	3:14
37.	"Faded Now" (Instrumental)	3:55
38.	"You're No Good" (Club Mix Instrumental)	7:48
39.	"Twist the Knife" (8 Track Instrumental)	3:05
40.	"Street Lights" (Instrumental)	3:06
41.	"I Want to Be Alone" (Instrumental)	3:46
42.	"Touch Red" (On Film Instrumental)	4:02
43.	"Wishing Well" (Alternate Instrumental)	2:36
44.	"The Runner" (Instrumental)	3:23
45.	"Burning Bridges" (Instrumental)	1:54
46.	"Move a Mountain" (On Film Instrumental)	3:00
47.	"The Runner" (Acappella)	3:12
Total length:		174:31

== Critical reception ==
=== Year-end rankings ===
Year-end and decade-end lists
Publication	Accolade	Rank	Ref.
Afisha Daily (Russia)	The Best Foreign Albums of 2019	9	

== Charts ==
Chart performance for Closer to Grey
Chart (2020)	Peak position
UK Independent Albums (Official Charts)	24
