= Never Tell =

Never Tell may refer to:

- "Never Tell", a song by Chromatics from Dear Tommy
- "Never Tell", a 1984 song by Violent Femmes from Hallowed Ground
