= Chrome Rats vs. Basement Rutz =

Studio album by Chromatics
- Released: February 10, 2003
- Recorded: May 12–16, 2002
- Genre: Post-punk
- Length: 40:27
- Label: Gold Standard Laboratories
- Producer: Johnny Jewel

Chromatics chronology
Chrome Rats vs. Basement Rutz (2003)	Plaster Hounds (2004)

Professional ratings
Review scores
Source	Rating
AllMusic	4/5 stars
Pitchfork	6.0/10

Chrome Rats vs. Basement Rutz is the debut album by the Chromatics, released in 2003 on the Gold Standard Laboratories record label.

== Track listing ==
No.	Title	Length
1.	"NBA"	3:05
2.	"Washed Up on a Beach of Infants"	2:38
3.	"Lithium Jaws"	2:00
4.	"Copper Fence"	2:08
5.	"Slant"	1:51
6.	"Hannah's Song"	1:25
7.	"Felt Tongue"	1:49
8.	"Skill Fall"	2:40
9.	"Jungle"	0:30
10.	"Two of Every Creature"	3:07
11.	"Fertile Future"	2:14
12.	"Left Shoulder"	3:15
13.	"Cave Care"	1:05
14.	"Plastic Kross"	3:07
15.	"Shrieking Rows"	4:22
16.	"Untitled"	5:11

== Personnel ==
- Hannah Blilie: drums, vocals, percussion
- Johnny Jewel: recording engineer, percussion, producer
- Adam Miller: vocals, bass, percussion
- Michelle Nolan: bass, vocals, guitar
- Devin Welch: guitar, bass, synthesizer
