= Fresh Blood =

Fresh Blood may refer to:

- Fresh Blood (album), a 1980 album by Steve Swindells
- "Fresh Blood" (song), a 2009 song by Eels
- Fresh Blood (TV series), an Australian television comedy anthology series
- "Fresh Blood" (Supernatural), an episode of the TV series Supernatural
- "Fresh Blood" (True Blood), an episode of the TV series True Blood
- "Fresh Blood", a 1987 album by Blood on the Saddle
- "Fresh Blood", a song by Chromatics, from the album Dear Tommy
