= Symmetry (band) =

American instrumental duo

Symmetry is an American instrumental musical duo consisting of Johnny Jewel and Nat Walker of Chromatics.

In late 2010 Jewel was asked by director Nicolas Winding Refn and lead actor Ryan Gosling to score the film Drive. He collaborated with Walker, but their material was ultimately not used. However the film soundtrack did include previously released music from Chromatics and Desire, both on Jewel's Italians Do It Better label. Jewel and Walker then formed Symmetry and further reworked and expanded on the original tracks, ending up with nine hours of music, two hours of which were released as an LP entitled "Themes For An Imaginary Film" in 2011. In 2011, they also released a promotional LP entitled The Messenger, in a limited edition of 1,500 copies on clear vinyl. In October 2013, a video for the song "The Hunt" was released via YouTube. In 2017, The Messenger was re-released with bonus tracks.

Symmetry has performed live internationally at private events for a number of fashion lines, including Gucci and Chanel.

Their song "The Hunt" is the main theme song to the American television series Those Who Kill on A&E.

On February 3, 2015, Symmetry released a remix of the Chromatics' track "Yes (Love Theme To Lost River)," the trailer music for Ryan Gosling's first film as a director, Lost River.

Symmetry, at first, is in progress with the second album, "Still Life," but with the breakup of Chromatics in August 2021, and the fact that Dear Tommy may not release to the public, it is unknown on what the second album could be if it may not be released at all.

== Discography ==
=== Albums ===
Year	Title	Record label
2011	Themes for an Imaginary Film	Italians Do It Better
2017	The Messenger	Italians Do It Better

=== EPs and Singles ===
Year	Title	Notes
2016	The Magician	EP
2016	Yes	Single
2018	Streets Of Fire	Single - Including instrumental
