= Deep Gems =

Compilation album by Glass Candy
- Released: October 28, 2008
- Recorded: March 2006 – October 2008; Suite 304 (Portland, Oregon)
- Genre: Synthpop; Italo disco; nu-disco
- Length: 49:06
- Label: Italians Do It Better
- Producer: Johnny Jewel

Glass Candy chronology
| B/E/A/T/B/O/X (2007) | Deep Gems (2008) |

Professional ratings
Review scores
| Source | Rating |
|---|---|
| Pitchfork Media | 5.1/10 |
| Spin | 3.5/5 stars |

Deep Gems is a collection of singles, B-sides, and rarities by American electronic music duo Glass Candy, released in October 2008 by the Italians Do It Better label.

== Track listing ==
All tracks are written by Glass Candy, except where noted.

| No. | Title | Lyrics | Music | Length |
|---|---|---|---|---|
| 1. | "Introduction" | | | 0:47 |
| 2. | "Feeling Without Touching" | | | 2:49 |
| 3. | "Poison or Remedy" | | | 3:42 |
| 4. | "Animal Imagination" | | | 6:04 |
| 5. | "The Beat's Alive" | | | 4:48 |
| 6. | "Something Stirring in Space" | | | 5:02 |
| 7. | "Theme from Deep Gems" | | | 1:29 |
| 8. | "Stars & Houses" | | | 3:50 |
| 9. | "Geto Boys" | Sugarboy Crawford | Isaac Hayes | 3:48 |
| 10. | "Ms. Broadway Remix" | Evelyne Lenton | Albert Weyman | 6:07 |
| 11. | "Soft Boundaries" | | | 3:42 |
| 12. | "Touching the Morning Mist" | | | 4:30 |
| 13. | "Silver Fountain" | | | 7:03 |

Notes

- "Poison or Remedy" is an alternative version of the track "Beatific" from the B/E/A/T/B/O/X album.
- "Stars & Houses" is an alternative version of the track "Digital Versicolor" from the B/E/A/T/B/O/X album.
- "Geto Boys" samples "Mind Playing Tricks on Me" originally performed by the Geto Boys.
- "Ms. Broadway" is a cover of the 1977 Belle Epoque song.

== Personnel ==
Credits adapted from the liner notes of Deep Gems.

- Glass Candy – arrangement "Ms. Broadway Remix"
- Johnny Jewel – production
- Eyvind Kang – viola, violin "Ms. Broadway Remix"
- Nat Walker – tenor saxophone "Ms. Broadway Remix"
