= Mothermary =

American musical duo

- Origin: New York, New York
- Genres: Art pop; darkwave; electropop; synth-pop; synthwave
- Years active: 2016-present
- Labels: Italians Do It Better, OTRONA
- Members: Elyse Winn; Larena Winn
- Website: www.mothermary.band

Mothermary (stylized as MOTHERMARY) is an American electropop duo composed of identical twin sisters Larena Winn and Elyse Winn. Originally from Missoula, Montana, the pair later relocated to New York City before being based in Los Angeles. Their work blends elements of synth-pop, art pop, and darkwave, and frequently explores themes of religion, identity, and sexuality.

Recorded in split studio time between New York and Los Angeles in 2020 and 2021, Mothermary released their debut studio album, I Am Your God, on January 28, 2022, through the independent record label Italians Do It Better.

== History ==
Larena and Elyse Winn were raised in Missoula, Montana, in a strict Mormon household. They attended Brigham Young University–Idaho. Larena Winn studied theater, while Elyse Winn left for Salt Lake City and joined the musical scene there. After leaving their religious community, the sisters moved to New York City. Elyse Winn founded Mothermary as a solo act before her sister joined, named after the mother of Jesus Christ.

Drawing on their shared upbringing and experiences leaving organized religion, the duo began writing music that incorporated religious symbolism alongside themes of empowerment, sexuality, and self-definition. The group collaborated with Chris McLaughlin of Cigar Cigarette to record several early releases, gaining attention within independent electronic and synth-pop circles. Their work came to the attention of Italians Do It Better, an independent label known for its retro-influenced electronic acts. The duo subsequently signed to the label.

== Musical style and influences ==
Mothermary’s music has been described as electropop, synth-pop, and darkwave, with stylistic influences from 1980s electronic music. Their recordings feature layered synthesizers, drum machines, and tightly blended and layered ethereal vocal performances.

In both lyrics and performance, the duo frequently engages with themes of faith, religious symbolism, power dynamics, sexuality, and identity.

== Conflict with A24 ==
In December 2025, film studio A24 released a trailer for a film named Mother Mary featuring a fictional musician by that name played by Anne Hathaway. Despite passing visual similarities, Elyse and Larena Winn have no relationship to the project or the character. The Mothermary Instagram account released short-form videos mocking both the trailer and A24's legal correspondence.

Music blog Weirdo Music Forever interviewed the Winns about the A24 film, its soundtrack (billed as "Mother Mary: Greatest Hits"), and promotional campaign. Larena Winn said, "It felt like I woke up in a nightmare. It’s not only called Mother Mary; it’s about an electropop artist named Mother Mary who makes music that sounds similar and whose aesthetics are gothy, dark, feminine, and embracing of the same iconic religious imagery, but reshaped in a very specific [and] similar way to how we are."

The writer and director of Mother Mary, David Lowery, states that the conception for his film began during the production of The Green Knight, a film shot in 2019 and released in 2021. The band has yet to mention or accuse Lowery by name in social media posts or interviews, only referring to A24 as the accused party.

== Discography ==
=== Studio albums ===
- I Am Your God (Italians Do It Better, 2022)

=== Extended plays ===
- Non-Duality (OTRONA, 2025)
