= Plaster Hounds =

Studio album by Chromatics
- Released: February 17, 2004
- Recorded: June – July 2003
- Genres: Indie rock, post-punk, noise rock, no wave, art rock
- Length: 30:26
- Label: Gold Standard Laboratories
- Producers: Jeremy Romagna, Chromatics

Chromatics chronology
Chrome Rats vs. Basement Rutz (2003)	Plaster Hounds (2004)	Night Drive (2007)

Professional ratings
Review scores
Source	Rating
AllMusic	4/5 stars
Pitchfork	7.8/10

Plaster Hounds is the second studio album by Chromatics. It was released in 2004 on the Gold Standard Laboratories record label.

== Overview ==
It contains a cover version of "Program" by the Silver Apples.

== Track listing ==
No.	Title	Length
1.	"Surrogate"	1:47
2.	"Garden"	2:34
3.	"Jesus"	3:43
4.	"Three Hearts (WASP)"	3:49
5.	"Vol. II"	1:23
6.	"Chalk Dust (Holy Water)"	2:48
7.	"24/23/22/21"	3:07
8.	"Monarch"	4:46
9.	"Ice Hatchets"	2:52
10.	"Program" (Silver Apples cover)	3:37

== Personnel ==
- Maximillion Ronald Avila – drums, percussion, and vocals
- Adam Miller – bass, drum programming, guitar, percussion, vocals, photography
- Nate Preston – saxophone
- Jeremy Romagna – producer
- Nat Sahlstrom – bass, guitar, and vocals
- Aleesha Whitley – Percussion
- Yume Nakajima – photography
- Chromatics – mixer, writer, producer

Recorded in July 2003 at the Type Foundry
