= Dear Tommy =

Unreleased studio album by Chromatics

Studio album by Chromatics
- Genres: Synth-pop; dream pop; Italo disco; synthwave
- Label: Italians Do It Better
- Producer: Johnny Jewel

Dear Tommy is the unreleased sixth studio album by Chromatics, originally scheduled for release on Valentine's Day 2015, then 2018. The album had not been released by the time the group disbanded in 2021, although 11 songs that were at one point intended for Dear Tommy were released between 2014 and 2020.

== Background ==
Dear Tommy was said to be completed and Chromatics announced the LP in December 2014. The single "Shadow" was released in 2015, including physical copies on vinyl, ahead of the album. By 2015 Chromatics had also shared the tracks "In Films", "Just Like You" and "I Can Never Be Myself When You're Around" on the Internet. However, it was reported in 2017 that Johnny Jewel had destroyed all physical copies of the album in January 2016—15,000 CDs and 10,000 vinyl copies—following a near-death experience while swimming in 2015 and his subsequent desire to improve the songs before release. Those songs already made available from the first version of the record were eventually removed from Internet sources. It is believed that the album was then re-recorded, including previously released songs. A representative for Chromatics has said that the Camera EP (2018) relates to the album Dear Tommy.

The group's intervening fifth album, Closer to Grey, was released on October 2, 2019, having only been announced the day before. The album's artwork features the Roman numeral VII. Despite having not been released, the band also labeled Dear Tommy with the numeral 'VI' on their social media. Another song from the unreleased album, "Teacher", was made available in April 2020 along with an updated track listing for the album. On August 10, 2021, the band announced their break-up.

In December 2021, following the band's split, Pitchfork reported that Jewel's story of the destruction of the entire print run of Dear Tommy in 2016 was disputed by multiple parties close to the band, including by the CD and vinyl pressing plants that would have been contracted by Italians Do It Better to print those copies at the time.

The album has been described as having a "mythic" and cult status among fans of the band. In 2019, Phoenix New Times wrote that it was "as if its anticipation has made it just as real and tangible as its predecessors." In a 2021 article about delayed albums, 34th Street Magazine wrote that the band's "constant balancing act of disappointment and reassurance keeps fans hooked into the masochism of Dear Tommy's delayed release cycle. But they also must come to terms with the fact that the album may never even come out at all." Rolling Stone concluded "it's possible that the band may one day release a completed Dear Tommy. Or maybe it will go down in history as the Smile of the 2010s."

== Track listing ==
Dear Tommy track listing
No.	Title	Length
1.	"Fresh Blood"
2.	"Glitter"
3.	"Never Tell"
4.	"Just Like You"
5.	"She Says"
6.	"The Moment"
7.	"Time Rider"
8.	"White Fences"
9.	"Teacher"
10.	"Between the Lines"
11.	"Too Late"
12.	"Dear Tommy"
13.	"Melodrama"
14.	"Ultra Vivid"
15.	"Colorblind"
16.	"Sometimes"
17.	"Dream Sequence"
18.	"Endless Sleep"

The following songs from this final tracklist were released by Chromatics as singles:

- "Just Like You" (February 2015)
- "Dear Tommy" (video released in August 2016, but was later pulled from YouTube)
- "Time Rider" (February 2019)
- "Teacher" (April 2020)
- "Endless Sleep" (October 2020, from After Dark 3; released as both the final single of the album and the final material from the band overall)

=== Other songs once intended for Dear Tommy ===
- "Camera" (originally released on the After Dark 2 compilation in 2013; A different recording possibly intended for Dear Tommy was released as a vinyl-only EP in 2018)
- "Cherry" (originally released on the After Dark 2 compilation in 2013)
- "4 A.M." (appeared on the original Dear Tommy tracklist in 2014; Never released)
- "After Hours" (appeared on the original Dear Tommy tracklist in 2014; Never released)
- "In Silence" (appeared on the original Dear Tommy tracklist in 2014; Never released, may have become "Whispers in the Hall" off Closer to Grey)
- "Touch Blue" (appeared on the original Dear Tommy tracklist in 2014; Never released, may have become "Touch Red" off Closer to Grey)
- "I Can Never Be Myself When You're Around" (issued as a single in 2015)
- "In Films" (issued as a single in 2015)
- "Shadow" (issued as a single in 2015 and performed by Chromatics on an episode of Twin Peaks in 2017)
- "Black Walls" (issued as a single in 2018)
- "Blue Girl" (issued as a single in 2018)
