= Eskimo Recordings =

- Parent company: N.E.W.S. Records
- Founded: 2000
- Genre: Nu disco, balearic house, house, cosmic disco
- Country of origin: Belgium
- Location: Ghent
- Official website: www.eskimorecordings.be

Eskimo Recordings are a Ghent-based record label that grew out of the eclectic parties that took place during the late nineties in the Eskimo Fabriek in Ghent. These underground parties got famous for mixing synthpop, new wave, acid house, funk and rock ‘n’ roll into a new and fresh sound, setting new standards for the Belgian club culture. International as well as local talented DJs such as Mo & Benoelie (later to be The Glimmers), TLP and The Flying Dewale Brothers (later to become 2 Many DJs) were usual guests at the turntables. As the Eskimo Fabriek needed refurbishment at the turn of the century, the Eskimo parties moved on to the Culture Club, and the temporary Belmondo concept at the S.M.A.K museum.

However, the vibe of these parties kept going through a new label that was founded in 2000 by Stefaan Vandenberghe and Dirk De Ruyck (Eskimo Recordings). From the very start, timeless quality and originality were the key values upon which the label was based. Old and new music were carefully combined into a new and different sound.

The first compilation release reflecting this Eskimo ethos came out in June 2000: Eskimo: Various Artists and Many Others. This first volume was compiled by Dirk, Mo & Benoelie and featured 1970s disco and funk as well as pop-soul, obscure acid hip house and new soul gem Revival by Martine Girault. The subsequent volumes 2-4 evolved into a kind of Balearic attitude, akin to DJ Alfredo's approach in Ibiza's Amnesia in the late 80s.

In 2002, a darker sounding strain of compilations called Serie Noire was released. These compilations relate more to a sound Ghent was familiar with before the Eskimo existed: the new beat.

Subsequently, Mo & Benoelie acquired an international DJ status under the name of The Glimmers, allowing them to spread the Eskimo ethos across the globe. This allowed the Eskimo story to evolve; the compilations were still defined generically but came with a DJ attached now. Various DJs made several compilations, respecting the "Eskimo approach" The Glimmers had started to dig deep in the crates to form a unique listening experience.

Throughout the years, Eskimo grew into an independent label that presented new talent such as Lindstrom & Prins Thomas, who released their debut album in 2005 with Eskimo Recordings. This led to several releases with the like-minded Aeroplane, who immediately caused a splash across Europe and particularly in the UK, becoming the label's most recognized act.

In 2012 Eskimo Recordings got to celebrate a decade of existence and did it with a fancy packed compilation release called Eskimonde: A Decade of Eskimo Recordings. This 5-CD release explores the label's catalog from a few different angles. Two "retrospective" discs come along with newly commissioned remixes as well as two final discs that show The Glimmers splitting up for solo mixes, both coursing through Eskimo's back catalog.

A year later in 2013, Eskimo Recordings entered its second decade of collection releases with a new concept "The color collections". These collections contain each a set of carefully selected songs that were all produced exclusively for this concept. As of June 2016, Pink, Blue, Green, Orange, and yellow collections have been released.

In 2016, Eskimo Recordings was recognized as one of Europe's most inspiring young labels and was selected by the IMPALA and The Independent Echo for the FIVEUNDERFIFTEEN campaign.

== Compilation releases ==
- Various Artists and Many Others (Vol 1, Vol 2, Vol 3) (2000, 2001, 2001)
- Recloose presents Jigsaw Music (2001)
- Summermadness Aftersun (2002)
- Serie Noire: Dark Pop and New Beat (2002)
- Eskimonde: A Decade of Eskimo Recordings (2012)
- The Colour Collection
  - The Pink Collection (2013)
  - The Blue Collection (2013)
  - The Green Collection (2014)
  - The Orange Collection (2015)
  - The Yellow Collection (2016)
  - The Red Collection (2017)
  - The Purple Collection (2018)

== Main artists ==
- Aeroplane
- Allez Allez
- Baldelli & Dionigi
- Bill Brewster
- Blende
- Bottin
- Dirty Minds
- DJ Naughty
- Downtown Party Network
- Freeform Five
- Headman
- Ilya Santana
- Ivan Smagghe
- Jean Winner
- Kris Menace
- L.S.B.
- Lindstrøm
- Lotterboys
- Low Motion Disco
- Michoacan
- NTEIBINT
- Optimo
- Peter Visti
- Prins Thomas
- Psychemagik
- Radio Slave
- Ray Mang
- Reverso 68
- Rub' N' Tug
- Satin Jackets
- Simone Fedi
- This Soft Machine
