= B/E/A/T/B/O/X =

2007 studio album by Glass Candy

Studio album by Glass Candy
- Released: November 6, 2007
- Recorded: Summer – fall 2007
- Studio: Suite 304 (Portland, Oregon)
- Genre: Synth-pop; Italo disco
- Length: 41:11
- Label: Italians Do It Better
- Producer: Johnny Jewel

Glass Candy chronology
Love Love Love (2003)	B/E/A/T/B/O/X (2007)	Deep Gems (2008)

Professional ratings
Review scores
Source	Rating
AllMusic	3.5/5 stars
Drowned in Sound	9/10
eMusic	4/5 stars
NME	8/10
Pitchfork	8.1/10

B/E/A/T/B/O/X is the second and final studio album by American electronic music duo Glass Candy, released on November 6, 2007, by Italians Do It Better. The album received two limited-edition vinyl pressings in 2008, both including a bonus 7″ (featuring the previously unreleased tracks "High B" and "The Gate"), and one of them pressed on pink vinyl. A new blue vinyl edition was released in April 2010, including the same bonus 7″.

== Track listing ==
All songs written by Glass Candy, except where noted.

1. "Introduction" – 1:29
2. "Beatific" – 4:20
3. "Etheric Device" – 3:13
4. "Candy Castle" – 5:27
5. "Rolling Down the Hills" – 3:29
6. "Life After Sundown" – 6:18
7. "Computer Love" (Kraftwerk) – 7:05
8. "Last Nite I Met a Costume" – 3:51
9. "Digital Versicolor" – 5:59

== Personnel ==
Credits adapted from the liner notes of B/E/A/T/B/O/X.

- Ida No – vocals
- Johnny Jewel – drum programming, production, synthesizer

== Release history ==
Release dates and formats for B/E/A/T/B/O/X
Region	Date	Label	Format
United States	November 6, 2007	Italians Do It Better	Digital download
United States	November 12, 2007	Italians Do It Better	CD
