= Lost River (film) =

2014 American fantasy thriller film by Ryan Gosling

- Theatrical release poster
- Directed by: Ryan Gosling
- Written by: Ryan Gosling
- Produced by: Marc Platt; Ryan Gosling; Adam Siegel; Michel Litvak; David Lancaster
- Starring: Christina Hendricks; Saoirse Ronan; Iain De Caestecker; Matt Smith; Eva Mendes; Ben Mendelsohn
- Cinematography: Benoît Debie
- Edited by: Valdís Óskarsdóttir; Nico Leunen
- Music by: Johnny Jewel
- Production companies: Marc Platt Productions; Phantasma Films; Bold Films
- Distributed by: Warner Bros. Pictures
- Release dates: May 20, 2014 (Cannes); April 10, 2015 (United States)
- Running time: 95 minutes
- Country: United States
- Language: English
- Budget: $2 million
- Box office: $615,500

Lost River is a 2014 American fantasy thriller film written, co-produced, and directed by Ryan Gosling, in his feature directorial debut. The film stars Christina Hendricks, Saoirse Ronan, Iain De Caestecker, Matt Smith, Ben Mendelsohn, Barbara Steele, and Eva Mendes (in her final film role).

Principal photography began in Detroit on May 6, 2013. The film premiered in competition in the Un Certain Regard section of the 2014 Cannes Film Festival, and was released in the United States on April 10, 2015.

== Plot ==
Single mother Billy lives in a rapidly declining and crumbling Detroit neighborhood with her two sons: teenager "Bones" and toddler Franky. While Franky is adored by both, Billy and Bones are emotionally distant from each other.

Bones spends his time salvaging copper piping from local abandoned buildings to buy needed parts for his car, while avoiding the vicious and sadistic Bully. Bully is monopolizing all copper recycling in the area via intimidation and violence. When Bully catches Bones in his territory, Bones abandons his finds and flees. Later, Bones reclaims his duffle bag of copper and escapes Bully and his toady, but is now marked for violence.

Meanwhile, his desperate mother Billy meets with the new mortgage banker, Dave, regarding the overdue predatory loan on her dilapidated and almost worthless family home. Unemployed, Dave offers Billy a mysterious job, without explaining its nature, only alluding to her physical beauty.

A demolition crew begins tearing down the vacant houses in the neighborhood. Along with Bones, Billy, and Franky, three of the few remaining residents are Rat, her grandmother, and her pet rat, Nick. Rat's catatonic grandmother repeatedly watches her old wedding video, mourning her husband, who died while constructing the local reservoir dam decades ago.

Bones discovers an overgrown road that leads under the lake. From Rat, he learns there was once a town and prehistoric dinosaur park where the reservoir now sits. Rat believes they must bring a "beast" from the underwater town to break the "curse" plaguing their neighborhood.

Dave's job offer leads Billy to a cabaret that Dave owns. Driven there by a friendly cabbie, she meets Cat, who does a theatrical gore show. The show's appeal is a theatrical, gory "murder", where Cat is stabbed or bludgeoned repeatedly, "spraying blood" into the captivated and delighted audience. Later, backstage, Cat shows Billy around and discusses potential cabaret skills and acts for her.

Rat invites Bones to go dancing at an abandoned high school and implies they would leave town together if necessary. Later, in a gas station convenience store, they are almost cornered by Bully and Face. Bones hides from them, and Rat accepts a ride home from Bully and Face, who later beheads her pet Nick, for aiding Bones's escape.

Billy must take Franky to work with her because Bones is out with Rat. For her gore performance, she "cuts off" her facial skin, which excites the audience and draws great applause. Billy later sits with Dave, the cabaret's host, who performs a song. He drives her and Franky home, and clearly declares his sexual desires for Billy.

Bones drops Billy off at work one night and sees the nature of her work. Unable to steal copper anymore to help financially, he plans to break the "curse." Leaving Franky with Rat, he dives into the reservoir to cut the head off a dinosaur statue. Meanwhile, Face sets Rat's house on fire and then dies in the flames. Rat cannot rouse and rescue her catatonic grandmother, so leaves with Franky.

Having retrieved the dinosaur head, Bones comes ashore to find his car ablaze. Bully tries to run him over, but Bones throws the dinosaur head through Bully's windshield, causing him to crash into the now smoldering car. Bully is violently ejected from his white convertible and drowns in the reservoir.

At work, Billy is sealed in a shell while Dave performs a sexually erotic dance routine around her. Despite Billy's plastic cage being locked, Dave has a remote device key. Billy steps out of the plastic chamber, stabs Dave in the ear, and then flees. Billy returns to find her sons and Rat sitting on their house steps while Rat's home burns. With the help of the taxi driver, the four of them leave the neighborhood with the dinosaur head strapped to the top of the taxi, concluding the film.

Rat's home continues to burn in the background as the credits roll. The background fades to black after a minute, but red smoke from the fire remains in the background.

== Cast ==
- Christina Hendricks as Billy
- Iain De Caestecker as Bones
- Saoirse Ronan as Rat
- Matt Smith as Bully
- Ben Mendelsohn as Dave
- Eva Mendes as Cat
- Reda Kateb as Cab Driver
- Barbara Steele as Grandmother
- Landyn Joseph Stewart as Franky
- Rob Zabrecky as MC
- Torrey Wigfield as Face

== Production ==
The film was originally titled How to Catch a Monster. In May 2013, scenes were shot at the Masonic Temple in Detroit, Michigan.

=== Music ===
The musical score for Lost River was composed by Johnny Jewel.

The first official tease of the film's music came on February 3, 2015, when Chromatics issued a single for their song, "Yes (Love Theme from Lost River)", which is featured in the film. Jewel released the soundtrack album on his own label, Italians Do It Better, on March 30, 2015. The soundtrack features music from the score, as well as songs from the film by Glass Candy, Chromatics, Desire, and Symmetry, as well as songs sung by Saoirse Ronan and Ben Mendelsohn, who star in the film. The song "Tell Me", sung by Ronan, was featured in the first episode of the 2017 television series Riverdale and in the eighth episode of the third season of Killing Eve. The soundtrack was released on CD, digitally, and as a limited 3xLP on purple vinyl.

== Release ==
The film premiered on May 20, 2014, at the Cannes Film Festival, where it was met with a mixed reception from the audience. Warner Bros. Pictures, the U.S. distributor of the film, was subsequently reported to be considering selling its distribution rights to another studio. The film was released simultaneously in select theaters in the United States and through video on demand platforms on April 10, 2015.

Lost River was part of the SXSW Film Festival in March 2015 in Austin, Texas.

An airing of the film by the Asian FX network on February 13, 2017, led to Indonesia's Broadcasting Commission giving the network a five-day sanction from April 10–14 where it was prohibited for broadcasting due to unapproved sensitive content.

== Critical reception ==
Lost River received mixed reviews at the time of its release. On Rotten Tomatoes, the film has a rating of 30%, based on 76 reviews, with an average rating of 4.60/10. The site's critics consensus reads, "Lost River suggests that debuting writer-director Ryan Gosling may have a bright future as a filmmaker, but it doesn't hold together well enough to recommend on its own merit." On Metacritic, the film has a score of 42 out of 100, based on 21 critics, indicating "mixed or average" reviews.

Peter Bradshaw of The Guardian stated that the film is "colossally indulgent, shapeless, often fantastically and unthinkingly offensive and at all times insufferably conceited". Kate Muir of The Sunday Times described the film as "a lurid mash up of Lynch, Refn and Edward Hopper. In a bad way." Robbie Collin of The Telegraph called the film "dumbfoundingly poor" and stated that Gosling "confuses 'making film' with 'assembling Tumblr of David Lynch & Mario Bava gifs'". The film was reviewed in Télérama and Le Monde.

By 2016, the film had begun to receive a more positive opinion from fans of the surreal fantasy genre.
