= After Dark (compilation album) =

Compilation album by various artists
- Released: May 31, 2007
- Recorded: 2007
- Genres: Italo disco, synth-pop, synthwave
- Length: 78:20
- Label: Italians Do It Better
- Producer: Johnny Jewel

Various artists chronology
After Dark (2007)	After Dark 2 (2013)

Professional ratings
Review scores
Source	Rating
AllMusic	4/5 stars
Pitchfork Media	8.3/10

After Dark is a compilation album of tracks either performed by artists on the Italians Do It Better record label or remixed by the label, released in 2007 on CD and in 2008 on triple vinyl. Artists featured on the album are Glass Candy, Chromatics, Indeep, Farah, Mirage, and Professor Genius.

In October 2012, Johnny Jewel released a remastered version of the album for free on SoundCloud to build anticipation for After Dark 2. Jewel announced that After Dark 2 would be released on May 17, 2013.

== Track listing ==
No.	Title	Writer(s)	Performer(s)	Length
1.	"Rolling Down the Hills" (Spring Demo)	Ida No, John David V	Glass Candy	3:33
2.	"Hands in the Dark" (Dark Day cover)	Robin Lee Crutchfield	Chromatics	4:48
3.	"Last Nite a DJ Saved My Life" (Mirage Remix)	Michael Cleveland, Achille Vettessi	Indeep	6:42
4.	"Lady Operator"	Vettessi	Mirage	5:39
5.	"Computer Love" (Kraftwerk cover)	Kraftwerk	Glass Candy	5:37
6.	"La Grotta" (Demo)	Professor Genius	Professor Genius	6:34
7.	"Killing Spree" (Suite 304 Demo)	V	Chromatics	1:19
8.	"Law of Life"	Farah, V	Farah	7:29
9.	"In the City"	Adam Miller, V	Chromatics	7:09
10.	"Miss Broadway" (Belle Epoque cover)	Evelyne Lenton, Albert Weyman, V	Glass Candy	6:46
11.	"Lake of Dreams"	Vettessi	Mirage	9:27
12.	"Dancing Girls" (Suite 304 Demo)	Farah, V	Farah	5:37
13.	"The Chameleon" (Dark Day cover)	Crutchfield	Glass Candy	4:56
14.	"Pegaso" (Excerpt)	Professor Genius	Professor Genius	2:44
