= Afro/cosmic music =

Genre of music

Afro/cosmic
- Stylistic origins: Funk; disco; Eurodisco; dance; electro; jazz rock; Brazilian music; various forms of African music
- Cultural origins: 1970s, Northern Italy
- Typical instruments: Synthesizer; drums; percussion
- Derivative forms: Space disco; hi-NRG; Italo house

In music, the terms Afro/cosmic disco, the cosmic sound, free-style sound, and combinations thereof (Afro, cosmic Afro, Afro-cosmic, Afro-freestyle, etc., as well as Afro-funky and later Afro house) are used somewhat interchangeably to describe various forms of synthesizer-heavy and/or African-influenced dance music and methods of DJing that were originally developed and promoted by a small number of DJs in certain discothèques of Northern Italy from the late 1970s through the mid-1980s. The terms slow-motion disco and Elettronica Meccanica are also associated with the genre.

Italian DJs Tosi Brandi Claudio and Daniele Baldelli both independently claim to have invented the genre and mixing style.

== Descriptions ==
The Afro/cosmic mixing style is freeform in that it allows for short hip-hop style transforms as well as long, beat-matched segues; it sometimes incorporates added percussion and effects; and it permits major speed variations to force songs into a 90–110 BPM range. Baldelli would also play 45 RPM records at 33 and vice versa. The cosmic sound included a very diverse range of musical styles, from electro and funk to jazz fusion and Brazilian music. Peter Shapiro described Baldelli's music as a "combination of spaced-out rock and tribal percussion." One genre that was usually not part of this mix was Italo disco, which Baldelli believes was generally too mainstream and commercial. In a 2005 feature on Daniele Baldelli, one of the style's founding DJs, music journalist Daniel Wang describes Baldelli's style as "psychedelic, churning, hypnotic."

The sound is psychedelic, churning, hypnotic — not at all frenetic or purely electronic. Metallic klangs glide over a slowed-down afro-percussion track. A train noise over a beat is mixed continuously with a funky guitar riff and then with a synthesizer composition (Jean-Michel Jarre?). Flangers and equalizer effects are applied, not like the overexcited tantrums of a modern DJ, but rather methodically and with deep feeling, changing the texture of entire passages, as if we are gently passing from a radio show through a train tunnel back to a great concert hall.

— Daniel Wang, Daniele Baldelli interview in Discopia #3

In the interview, Baldelli emphasizes playing diverse selections of classical, African and Brazilian folk, and synth-pop at improper speeds, mixed with effects and drum machines:

To explain to you what I was doing... For example, I used to play bolero by Ravel, and on top of this I would play an African song by Africa Djola, or maybe an electronic tune by Steve Reich, with which I would mix a Malinké chant from New Guinea(sic). Or, I would mix T-Connection with a song by Moebius and Rodelius, adding the hypnotic-tribal Izitso album of Cat Stevens, and then Lee Ritenour, but also Depeche Mode at 33 instead of 45, or a reggae voice by Yellowman at 45 instead of 33. I might mix 20 African songs on top of a Korg electronic drums (machine) rhythm pattern. I would play a Brazilian batucada and mix it with a song by Kraftwerk. I would also use synthesizer effects on the voices of Miriam Makeba, Jorge Ben, or Fela Kuti, or I would play the Oriental melodies of Ofra Haza or Sheila Chandra with the electronic sounds of the German label SKY.

— Daniele Baldelli, Interview in Discopia #3

Cosmic music has been cited as a "touchstone" for contemporary "space disco" artists like Lindstrøm collaborator Prins Thomas and Andy Meecham of Chicken Lips. It has also been cited as an influence on some later Italian house songs, such as Sueño Latino.

== Etymology ==
"Cosmic", "cosmic disco", or "the cosmic sound" derives from Cosmic Club; referring to the sound of that venue. As such, the term is principally associated with Baldelli, who makes a claim to its invention.

"Afro" is Loda's term for 1. his selections from African-influenced disco, soul, funk and jazz fusion genres; 2. his selections of alternative and experimental dance music that typically comprised the first hour of his sets; 3. his general mixing style; and 4. a 1982–1984 series of his mixtapes. In recent interviews, he has suggested a preference for the term "freestyle" rather than Afro, and he makes a distinction between cosmic and his style, claiming that cosmic music is the sound of mid-1980s and later pretenders, is a misnomer popular only outside of Italy, and isn't even a real genre.

Baldelli claims that during his military service around 1984, there was a "guest" DJ who became famous playing Baldelli's selections at Cosmic Club. Baldelli's protégé, Claudio 'TBC' Tosi Brandi, performed at Cosmic Club around that time, as did Beppe Loda.

Loda counters that no one person invented the genre and style of mixing; he says he coined the term Afro in 1979 to collectively refer to the eclectic, African-influenced music that he and other Northern Italian DJs were playing at the time, and later applied it to the integration of Baldelli's electronic style with his own.

The liner notes of a mid-2000s Cosmic Club tribute album featuring Baldelli uses both Afro and cosmic in reference to the music.

The term "afro-cosmic" was also used by one music journalist in 2006 to describe the late-1960s/early-1970s music of saxophonist Pharoah Sanders.

== Regional variations and gatherings ==
In 1983, after hearing the music in Italy, Austrian DJ Enne and Stefan Egger brought it to the club Galaxy in Innsbruck, Austria, and at some point introduced it to German audiences while on tour. Beginning in 1987, Egger started mixing it with more straightforward, slightly faster (but still relatively slow) dance records of the day. His style, once dubbed "Eben cosmic music" by Hannes Alshut & Rob Neureiter, remains popular in Austria and Southern Germany to the present day.

Regular gatherings of Afro/cosmic enthusiasts have occurred in Germany, Austria and Italy since the music's early days. Afroraduno, the first such gathering of Afroraduni, took place in Gambara, Brescia (Italy) in 1983.

== Important places ==
Afro/Cosmic music has been associated with iconic disco clubs in Lombardy (Northern Italy) and had relevant impact on the sub-culture of teenagers and young adults until the early 2010s.

Primastella – Fara Olivana con Sola (BG) – Italy

Dylan – Coccaglio (BS) – Italy

Tam-Tam – Carobbio degli Angeli (BG) – Italy

Sabbie Mobili – Chignolo d'Isola (BG) – Italy

== Selected discography ==
- Daniele Baldelli – COSMIC: The Original 1979–1984 2-CD compilation + book
- Daniele Baldelli presents Baia degli Angeli 1977–1978 compilation + book
- Daniele Baldelli presents Baia degli Angeli 1977–1978 vol. 2 compilation + book
- Elaste vol. 1 – Slow Motion Disco: Originals from the Cosmic Era, compiled by DJ Mooner compilation
- Typhoon: Portrait of the Electronic Years compilation by Beppe Loda
- Roberto-Lodola-Mondo Blu-TheGoldenYears compilation mixed by Roberto Lodola
- Roberto-Lodola-Mondo Blu-TheGoldenYears 2 compilation mixed by Roberto Lodola
- Roberto-Lodola-Mondo Blu-TheGoldenYears 3 compilation mixed by Roberto Lodola

== See also ==
- Balearic beat
