= Appaloosa (band) =

- Origin: Paris, France; London, England
- Genres: Electronic; Disco house Electropop
- Years active: 2006-present
- Label: Kitsuné
- Members: Anne-Laure Keib; Max Krefeld

Appaloosa is a band composed of lyricist/vocalist Anne-Laure Keib and musician Max Krefeld. The pair met when Anne-Laure left her native Paris to spend time in Berlin, and together they formed Appaloosa there in June 2006.

Keib writes the lyrics and serves as the band's vocalist and front-woman. Krefeld writes the music which frequently involves programming and the use of synthesizers.

Appaloosa's song, "The Day (We Fell in Love)" appeared on Kitsuné Maison Compilation 6, released by Kitsuné Musique in October 2008.

In the latter part of 2008, Keib's longtime friend and former roommate Chan Marshall invited Appaloosa to support Cat Power on a US tour.

In February 2009, Kitsuné Musique released "The Day (We Fell in Love)" as a 12" single, with remixes by house music producer Todd Edwards and the LA based Acid Girls. Around the same time photographer Patrick O'Dell created a video for the original version of the song.

In May 2014, they supported Cat Power on a European tour.
