= Chromatics (band) =

American electronic music band

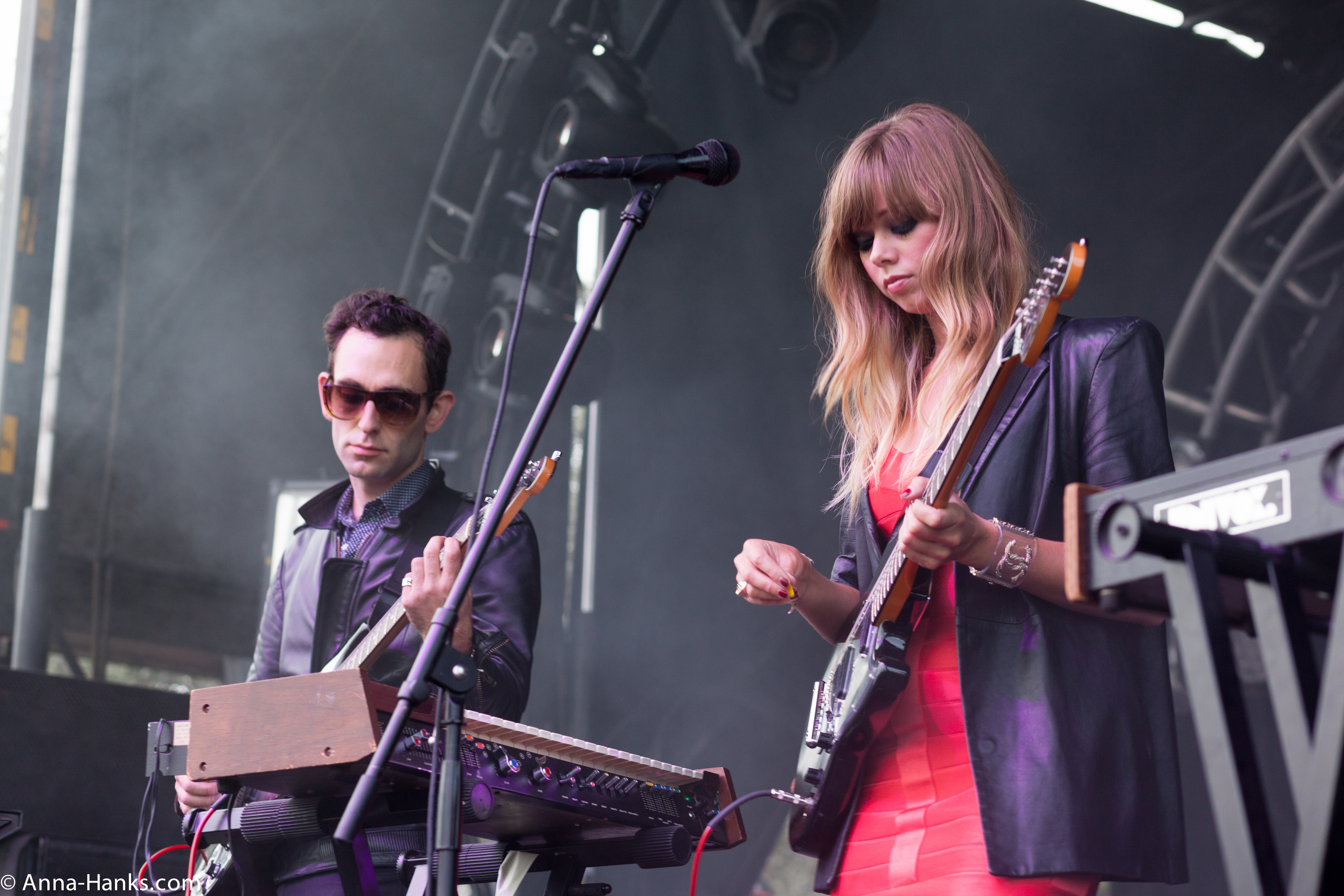
- Miller and Radelet performing at Fun Fun Fun Fest in Austin, Texas, 2013

Background information
- Origin: Portland, Oregon, U.S.
- Genres: Synth-pop; synth-rock; indie rock; dream pop; no wave (early)
- Years active: 2001–2021
- Labels: Gold Standard Laboratories; Italians Do It Better
- Past members: Ruth Radelet; Adam Miller; Nat Walker; Johnny Jewel; Hannah Blilie; Devin Welch; Michelle Nolan; Maximillion Ronald Avila; Nat Sahlstrom; Nate Preston; Aleesha Whitley; Chelsea Mosher; Lena Okazaki
- Website: Official Facebook

Chromatics were an American electronic music band from Portland, Oregon, formed in 2001. The band's final line-up consisted of Ruth Radelet (vocals, guitar, synthesizer), Adam Miller (guitar, vocoder), Nat Walker (drums, synthesizer), and Johnny Jewel (producer, multi-instrumentalist). The band originally featured a trademark sound indebted to punk and lo-fi that was described as "noisy" and "chaotic". After numerous lineup changes, which left guitarist Adam Miller as the sole original member, the band began releasing material on the Italians Do It Better record label in 2007, with their style streamlined into an Italo disco-influenced sound.

Their third album Night Drive (2007) was met with critical acclaim, as was their fourth album, Kill for Love, which was released on March 26, 2012. Several of the band's songs have been featured in television series such as Bates Motel, Gossip Girl, Mr. Robot, The Mindy Project, Parenthood, Revenge, Riverdale, 13 Reasons Why, The 100, Baby, and Twin Peaks: The Return, as well as being featured in the films Drive (2011), Taken 2 (2012), Only You (2018), and The Perfection (2019). In December 2014, the band announced what would have been their fifth studio album, titled Dear Tommy. While Chromatics have released a number of singles from it, Dear Tommy had yet to be released when they instead issued the album Closer to Grey in October 2019. The band announced its break-up in August 2021.

== History ==
=== 2002–2003: Early lineup ===
Adam Miller played in The Vogue, a group that garnered media attention around Seattle. The Vogue were barely out of high school and created art punk that drew comparisons to The Fall. This band featured Johnny Whitney of The Blood Brothers on vocals and Hannah Blilie who went on to play drums in The Gossip. After The Vogue's keyboardist departed, the remaining members formed Soiled Doves, and released one 7-inch and one album. Although Chromatics began as a solo project for Adam Miller, he quickly added most of The Soiled Doves' lineup. Adam Miller became the vocalist. Devin Welch played guitar. Michelle Nolan, a new addition, played bass guitar, and Blilie played drums. After releasing their debut album Chrome Rats vs. Basement Rutz in 2003 on Gold Standard Laboratories, all members except Miller left to form Shoplifting.

=== 2003–2005: Stripped down ===
Miller and a revamped lineup released the band's second studio album, Plaster Hounds, in 2004 on Gold Standard Laboratories. This lineup featured Adam Miller performing double duty on guitar and vocals, with Nat Sahlstrom on bass and the Get Hustle's Ron Avila on percussion. The lineup changed once again, as Miller played many of the same songs from the Plaster Hounds era with Lena Okazaki replacing Sahlstrom on bass and a drum machine replacing the free jazz-influenced percussive style of Avila. This lineup of Miller and Okazaki released a few CD-Rs, still in the lo-fi art punk style that had been established, but the addition of the drum machine hinted at the major stylistic shift to come.

While Miller's CD-Rs with Okazaki hinted at an electronic direction, Okazaki left the band and Chromatics went through their largest reinvention around 2005, becoming the quartet of Miller, Ruth Radelet, Johnny Jewel, and Nat Walker. This resulted in a gradual but dramatic shift in the band's sound and live performance. Chromatics have often toured the world with labelmates Glass Candy, since Jewel plays in both bands, as well as Desire, a side project of Jewel and Walker. Walker and Jewel also have an instrumental project called Symmetry.

=== 2006–2010: Night Drive ===
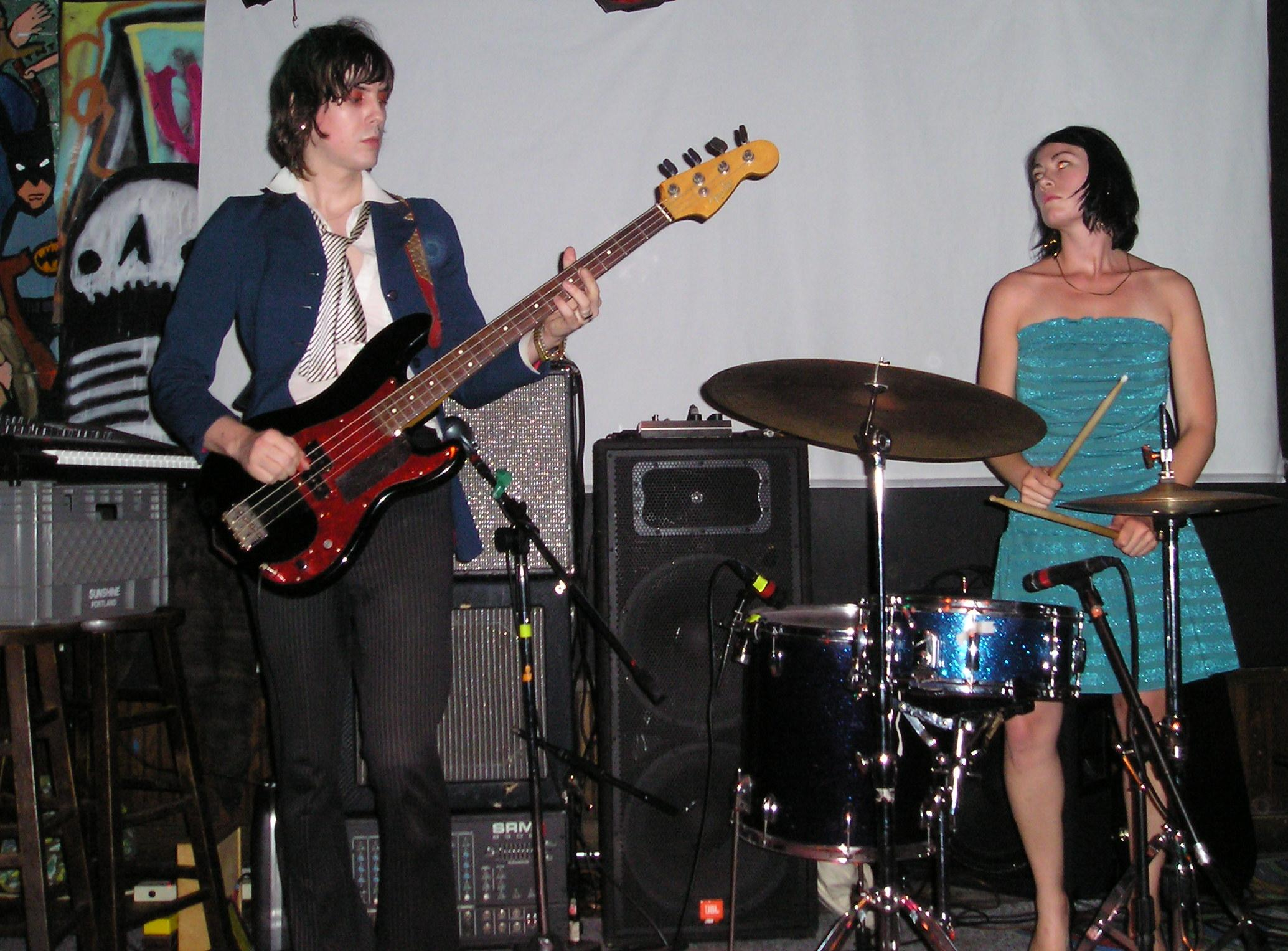
Chromatics in 2006

Chromatics' third studio album, Night Drive, released in 2007 on Italians Do It Better, was the band's most acclaimed release. On Night Drive, the group ditched their "hairy noise-rock troupe" aesthetic in favor of a "neatly groomed pop-dance quartet". In their review of the album, Pitchfork noted that "the transformation of Chromatics has been so effortless that it's still easy to be wowed by the results", adding that "listeners who are only familiar with the band's forays into shambling punk will certainly be surprised by Night Drive's assured songwriting".

Various songs from Night Drive have been licensed for usage in multiple Hollywood films, television shows, international television and internet advertisements, and runway shows.

Other releases have included the Nite and In Shining Violence EPs. In 2007, Chromatics' non-album tracks "In the City" and "Hands in the Dark", as well as a demo of Night Drive's "The Killing Spree", were featured on the Italians Do It Better compilation album After Dark.

=== 2011–2013: Kill for Love ===
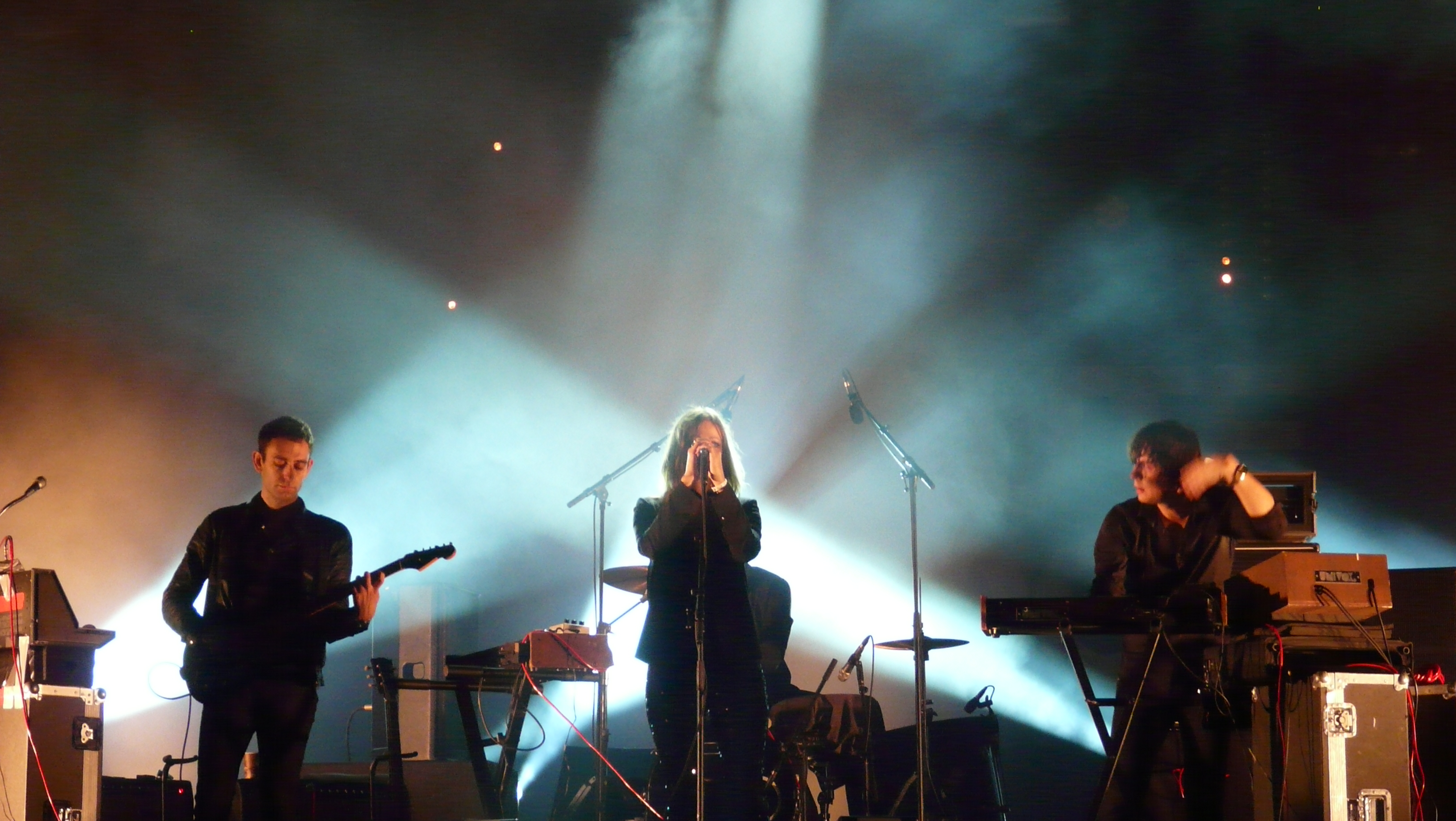
Chromatics performing at La Route du Rock festival in 2012

Chromatics gained recognition for their song "Tick of the Clock" which was used in the film Drive, released in September 2011 by director Nicolas Winding Refn, and its soundtrack, and again in the film Taken 2, released in October 2012 by director Olivier Megaton, and its soundtrack. On December 23, 2011, Jewel and Walker—under the name Symmetry—released Themes for an Imaginary Film, which was described by Pitchfork as Jewel's "most ambitious project to date: a sprawling, 37-track, two-hour collection of cinematic noir-electro", featuring contributions from Chromatics and fellow Italians Do It Better acts Glass Candy, Desire and Mirage.

On October 23, 2011, Chromatics released the title track from their then-upcoming fourth studio album, Kill for Love. Reviews described the single as a "really hypnotizing, fascinating song that will definitely get you psyched for the record—Ruth Radalet warmly croons her sweet, cryptic confessional lyrics while her band effortlessly weaves a bubbling, dreamy, New Order-esque soundscape".

The Fader mentioned, "Maybe Kill for Love will inaugurate a sea change where artists come to terms with themselves and start being open about how they sound when they sing. In basement studios everywhere, young vocalists will blink three times and start x-ing out effects in Ableton, look at the mirror for the first time in weeks, deep into their beady, sun-deprived eyes and whisper: "God, there are no shortcuts... Kill for Love continues the band's penchant for popular-sound defiance that made Chromatics so exciting in the first place."

After waiting patiently, Chromatics have begun to reach fans "five years after the release of their incredibly prescient Night Drive album". "Kill for Love" was featured in the television shows Bates Motel and Gossip Girl. On February 11, 2012, the band leaked a second track from Kill for Love, "Into the Black", a cover of the Neil Young song "My My, Hey Hey (Out of the Blue)", which was featured in the television shows Mr. Robot, Revenge, Riverdale, 13 Reasons Why, and The 100. Chromatics followed their second leak with three additional tracks, "Lady", "Candy" and on March 11, 2012 their fifth leak "Back from the Grave".

As fans anticipated the album, Jewel mentioned that the process of creating Kill for Love resulted in a total of 36 tracks that have been narrowed down to 17 for the album.

Chromatics' fourth studio album, Kill for Love, was released on March 26, 2012. The album has been described as sounding like a "time warp ... a warm collision of past, present, and future". On May 7, 2012, the group released an alternative version of Kill for Love for free download, featuring eleven songs from the original album with no drums or percussion. Songs from the album have been featured in television shows such as Bates Motel, Gossip Girl, Mr. Robot, Parenthood, Revenge, Riverdale, and 13 Reasons Why. Kill for Love was named the eighth best album of 2012 by Pitchfork.

Chromatics were invited by Karl Lagerfeld to play the Chanel Spring Summer 2013 fashion show in Paris in early October. The band was put above the runway, overlooking the whole catwalk and creating a dreamy ambience. Chromatics performed about five new and old songs.

=== 2014–2021: Dear Tommy, Closer to Grey and break-up ===
On December 4, 2014, the band announced their fifth studio album, Dear Tommy. The album was preceded by the singles "Just Like You", "I Can Never Be Myself When You're Around", and "In Films". On February 3, 2015, Chromatics released the three-track single "Yes (Love Theme from Lost River)", which is included in both the trailer and soundtrack for Ryan Gosling's directorial debut, Lost River, and featured in the television show Riverdale. The soundtrack was released on March 30 by Italians Do It Better, while the film was released on April 10. The song "Shadow" was made available on September 9. On November 5, Chromatics released seven cover versions of Cyndi Lauper's "Girls Just Wanna Have Fun", one which was featured in an ad for Mango featuring Kate Moss and Cara Delevingne, and another that is featured in the trailer for the 2019 Netflix original series Baby. The band released a music video for the title track "Dear Tommy" on August 25, 2016.

In May 2017, Chromatics' former manager revealed on Twitter that Jewel had destroyed all copies of the finished Dear Tommy following a near-death experience in late 2015, but had subsequently re-recorded the entire album. As of January 2023, the album has not been released. The band performed "Shadow" at the end of the two-hour-long season premiere of Showtime's Twin Peaks revival series, which aired on May 21, 2017. The band released a deluxe version of the Cherry EP on July 31, 2017.

In 2019, the band released a cover of the song "Petals" by Hole, from their third studio album Celebrity Skin, which was featured on the soundtrack for the horror film The Perfection. On October 1, 2019, the Italians Do It Better website was updated to show a new Chromatics album, albeit with the album and track names obscured. Upon the album's release in New Zealand, the album title was revealed to be Closer to Grey, and the album title and track names were officially announced worldwide. The album was released on October 2, 2019. The band stated through their Instagram account that Closer to Grey did not contain any material from Dear Tommy, and that the latter album would still be released, with no release date announced. On January 24, 2020, Chromatics released a new single, "TOY". On March 6, they released another single, "Famous Monsters". On April 16 they released "Teacher" and a new tracklisting for Dear Tommy.

On August 10, 2021, the band (with the notable exception of Jewel) announced their disbandment. However, a representative for Johnny Jewel and Italians Do It Better confirmed the band's breakup in a statement to Pitchfork, writing: "Johnny is extremely proud of his work with the project over the years and he'll continue making music and supporting great art and artists through his label Italians Do It Better."

== Tours ==
Chromatics played at numerous music festivals around the world, such as the Paris Pitchfork Music Festival and Barcelona Primavera in 2012. In September 2013, the band opened for English band the xx at the Hollywood Bowl.

== Members ==
Final line-up

- Adam Miller – guitar, vocoder, vocals (2001-2021)
- Ruth Radelet – vocals, guitar, synthesizer (2006-2021)
- Nat Walker – drums, synthesizer (2005-2021)
- Johnny Jewel – programming, production, synthesizer, guitar, drums, mixing, engineering (2005-2021)

Former members

- Devin Welch - guitar (2002-2003)
- Michelle Nolan - bass guitar (2002-2003)
- Hannah Blilie - drums (2002-2003)
- Nat Sahlstrom - bass guitar (2003-2004)
- Ron Avila - drums, percussion (2003-2004)
- Lena Okazaki - bass guitar (2004)

== Discography ==
=== Studio albums ===
- Chrome Rats vs. Basement Rutz (Gold Standard Laboratories, 2003)
- Plaster Hounds (Gold Standard Laboratories, 2004)
- Night Drive (Italians Do It Better, 2007)
- Kill for Love (Italians Do It Better, 2012)
- Cherry (Deluxe) (Italians Do It Better, 2017)
- Dear Tommy (unreleased)
- Closer to Grey (Italians Do It Better, 2019)
- Faded Now (Italians Do It Better, 2020)

=== Mixtapes ===
- Running from the Sun (Italians Do It Better, 2012)

=== Extended plays ===
- Cavecare (Hand Held Heart, 2002)
- Nite (Troubleman Unlimited, 2006)
- In the City (Italians Do It Better, 2010)
- Lady (Italians Do It Better, 2012)
- Cherry (Italians Do It Better, 2014)
- Just Like You (Italians Do It Better, 2015)
- Camera (Italians Do It Better, 2018)

=== Singles ===
- "Beach of Infants"/"Steps" (Hand Held Heart, 2001)
- "Arms Slither Away"/"Skill Fall" (K, 2002)
- "Ice Hatchets"/"Curtains" (Gold Standard Laboratories, 2003)
- "Healer"/"Witness" (Troubleman Unlimited, 2005)
- "Tick of the Clock" (Italians Do It Better, 2013)
- "Cherry" (Italians Do It Better, 2013)
- "These Streets Will Never Look the Same" (Italians Do It Better, 2013)
- "Yes (Love Theme from Lost River)" (Italians Do It Better, 2015)
- "Just Like You" (Italians Do It Better, 2015)
- "I Can Never Be Myself When You're Around" (Italians Do It Better, 2015)
- "In Films" (Italians Do It Better, 2015)
- "Shadow" (Italians Do It Better, 2015)
- "Girls Just Wanna Have Fun" (Italians Do It Better, 2015)
- "Black Walls" (Italians Do It Better, 2018)
- "Blue Girl" (Italians Do It Better, 2018)
- "I'm on Fire" (Italians Do It Better, 2018)
- "Time Rider" (Italians Do It Better, 2019)
- "I Want to Be Alone" (Italians Do It Better, 2019)
- "You're No Good" (Italians Do It Better, 2019)
- "TOY" (Italians Do It Better, 2020)
- "Famous Monsters" (Italians Do It Better, 2020)
- "Teacher" (Italians Do It Better, 2020)

=== Guest appearances ===
Title	Year	Album
"Hands in the Dark"	2007	After Dark
"Killing Spree" (Suite 304 Demo)	2007	After Dark
"In the City"	2007	After Dark
"Tick of the Clock"	2011	Drive (Original Motion Picture Soundtrack)
"Tick of the Clock"	2012	Taken 2 (Original Soundtrack)
"Looking for Love"	2013	After Dark 2
"Camera"	2013	After Dark 2
"Cherry"	2013	After Dark 2
"Yes (Love Theme from Lost River)"	2015	Lost River (Music from the Motion Picture; Soundtrack)
"Blue Moon"	2015	Lost River (Music from the Motion Picture; Soundtrack)
"Yes" (Symmetry Remix)	2015	Lost River (Music from the Motion Picture; Soundtrack)
"Yes (Lullaby from Lost River)"	2015	Lost River (Music from the Motion Picture; Soundtrack)
"Shadow"	2017	Twin Peaks: Music from the Limited Event Series
"Saturday" (instrumental)	2017	Twin Peaks: Music from the Limited Event Series
"Let's Make This a Moment to Remember"	2018	The Perfection: Motion Picture Soundtrack
"Petals"	2018	The Perfection: Motion Picture Soundtrack
"Blinding Lights" (Chromatics Remix)	2020	After Hours (Remixes)
