= Desire (band) =

Canadian electronic music duo

- Origin: Montreal, Quebec, Canada
- Genres: Synth-pop; Italo disco; new wave
- Years active: 2009–present
- Label: Italians Do It Better
- Members: Megan Louise; Johnny Jewel
- Past members: Nat Walker

Desire is a Canadian electronic music duo from Montreal, based in Palm Springs, California. Formed in 2009, the band consists of vocalist Megan Louise and producer Johnny Jewel, a former member of Chromatics and Glass Candy. Nat Walker (also a previous member of Chromatics) was formerly a member of Desire, playing synthesizer and drums. Their lyrics are in French and English.

Their debut studio album, II, was released in 2009, via the Italians Do It Better label. Fact magazine listed II as the 14th best album of 2009. That same year, the band's song "Under Your Spell" was featured in the 2010 S/S Max Mara fashion show, in Christian Dior's Haute Couture Spring–Summer 2012, and in the soundtracks of the 2011 films Drive and Oslo, August 31. Kid Cudi sampled "Under Your Spell" in his 2012 song "Teleport 2 Me, Jamie". Desire recorded the song "Behind the Mask" for the soundtrack to the 2015 film Lost River.

== Discography ==
Studio albums

- Desire (2009)
- Escape (2022)
- Games People Play (2025)

EPs

- Under Your Spell (2015)
- Dangerous Drug (2024)
- I Know (2024)
- Drama Queen (2024)
- The Judge (2025)
- Dream Girl (2025)
- Code of Desire (2026)

Singles

- "If I Can't Hold You" (2009)
- "Under Your Spell" (2009)
- "Tears from Heaven" (2018)
- "Bizarre Love Triangle" (2020)
- "Escape" (2020)
- "Black Latex" (2020)
- "Liquid Dreams" (2020)
- "Boy" (2020)
- "Don't Call" (2020)
- "Zeros" (2021)
- "Future Lights" with Double Mixte (2021)
- "Ghosts" (2021)
- "Haenim" feat. Ether (2021)
- "Can't Get You Out of My Head" feat. Guy Gerber (2022)
- "54321" feat. Omar-S (2022)
- "Telling Me Lies" (2022)
- "Love Is a Crime (feat. Mirage)" (2022)

- "Metronomy" (2023)
- "Hard Times" feat. Omar-S (2023)
- "Parisian Time" feat. Jimmy Whoo (2023)
- "The Power of Love" (2023)
- "Love Races On" (2023)
- "White Horses (feat. Mitchell Yoshida)" (2024)
- "Darkside" (2024)
- "Human Nature" (2024)
- "Vampire" (2024)
- "Montana" (2024)
- "Dangerous Drug" (2024)
- "I Know" (2024)
- "In a Manner of Speaking" (2024)
- "Drama Queen" (2024)
- "Summer Skin" (2026)
- "all i wanted" (2026)
- "Just Another Love Song (2026)
