= Italians Do It Better =

Independent record label

- Founded: July 20, 2006
- Genre: Synth-pop, post-punk, Italo disco, synthwave, dream pop
- Country of origin: U.S.
- Location: Portland, Oregon; West Hollywood, California

Italians Do It Better is an independent record label based in Portland and West Hollywood. It was started by Johnny Jewel and Mike Simonetti on July 20, 2006, to focus on Jewel's projects Glass Candy and Chromatics and later Desire, Symmetry and Mirage, in addition to other artists from prior releases. Genres from the label have been described as contributing to the synth-pop, post-punk, and Italo-disco revivals. They have released four label compilations, 'After Dark' (2007), 'After Dark 2' (2013), 'After Dark 3' (2020), and 'After Dark 4' (2022), all of which feature music from their roster.

Italians Do It Better is owned by Johnny Jewel, who produces, writes, and contributes to all the acts on the label.

== History ==
=== Beginnings ===
Italians Do It Better was founded on July 20, 2006 by Johnny Jewel and Mike Simonetti. Jewel's group Glass Candy initially released music through Simonetti’s label Troubleman Unlimited Records, but they wanted to create a more electronic-focused label and began Italians Do It Better. The label was named after a phrase on a T-shirt worn by Madonna in her 1986 music video for "Papa Don't Preach".

In an interview with Vice's music website Noisey, Jewel commented on the label's origins:

One of the reasons why I started Italians Do It Better is because I didn't want someone telling me when a record was due, or when something needed to be written or recorded. Or when I needed to go on tour. I believe in doing things when it's ready. It’s a dangerous game because the world is moving so fast. But ultimately the only reason we're having this conversation is because I love music. And that's the path that it's led me on in my life. I never set out to be a successful musician, but musical decisions have always guided my life. For that reason, I will stay true to what I really feel…

=== 2007–present ===
Italians Do It Better began gaining significant international recognition in 2007 with three consecutive releases of the label compilation After Dark, Chromatics' Night Drive, and Glass Candy's B/E/A/T/B/O/X.

Other major releases on the label include the 2011 album Themes for an Imaginary Film from Symmetry (a collaboration between Johnny Jewel and Chromatics' Nat Walker), Chromatics' 2012 album Kill for Love, and After Dark 2 in 2013.

The songs "Tick of the Clock" by Chromatics and "Under Your Spell" by Desire were both used in the soundtrack to the 2011 film Drive.

Pitchfork stated "Whether you treat it as background music, incidental listening, or a two-hour magnum opus, Themes for an Imaginary Film is a well-rounded portrait of a key figure in the American electronic music landscape." BBC Music called Kill for Love "one of the finest records to surface" in 2012. When asked to comment on his own production sound for SPIN's 8-out-of-10 review of Kill for Love, Jewel describes it as that specific "point in the night, you've passed out or you're done making love or whatever. That mindset opens the CD up for room ambience and conversation, and we step into the background — we slip away."

A number of the label's releases have been awarded the coveted "Best New Music" tag from Pitchfork including After Dark, After Dark 2 and Chromatics' Kill for Love.

After Dark 2 was released on May 17, 2013. It featured new tracks from Chromatics, Glass Candy, and Desire.

Glass Candy is currently working on a new album entitled Body Work.

In December 2014, Chromatics announced that a new, 17-track-album entitled Dear Tommy would be available via the label "in time for Valentine's Day." As of 2025, the album has not been released.

Italians Do It Better released the original motion picture soundtrack to Ryan Gosling's directorial debut, Lost River, on March 30. The soundtrack features music from the score, as well as songs from the film by Glass Candy, Chromatics, and Desire, plus songs sung by Saoirse Ronan and Ben Mendelsohn, who star in the film. The soundtrack is released on CD, digitally, and as a limited 3xLP on purple vinyl.

Italians Do It Better are the curators of the soundtrack for the 2025 adventure racing video game Wheel World.

== Artists ==
=== Current ===
- Annie-Claude Deschênes
- Bark Bark Disco
- Curses
- Jorja Chalmers
- Club Intl
- Desire
- Dlina Volny
- Double Mixte
- Esper Star
- Farah
- Juno Francis
- Johnny Jewel
- JOON
- Mirage
- Mothermary
- Nicolaas
- Orion

=== Alumni ===
- Andrew Douglas Rothbard
- Bottin
- Causeway
- Chromatics
- Fred Ventura
- Glüme
- Glass Candy
- Heaven
- In Mirrors
- Invisible Conga People
- Krakow Loves Adana
- Nite Jewel
- Pink Gloves
- Ramxes
- Symmetry
- Tess Roby
- Twisted Wires

== See also ==
- List of electronic music record labels
