= Glass Candy =

American electronic music duo

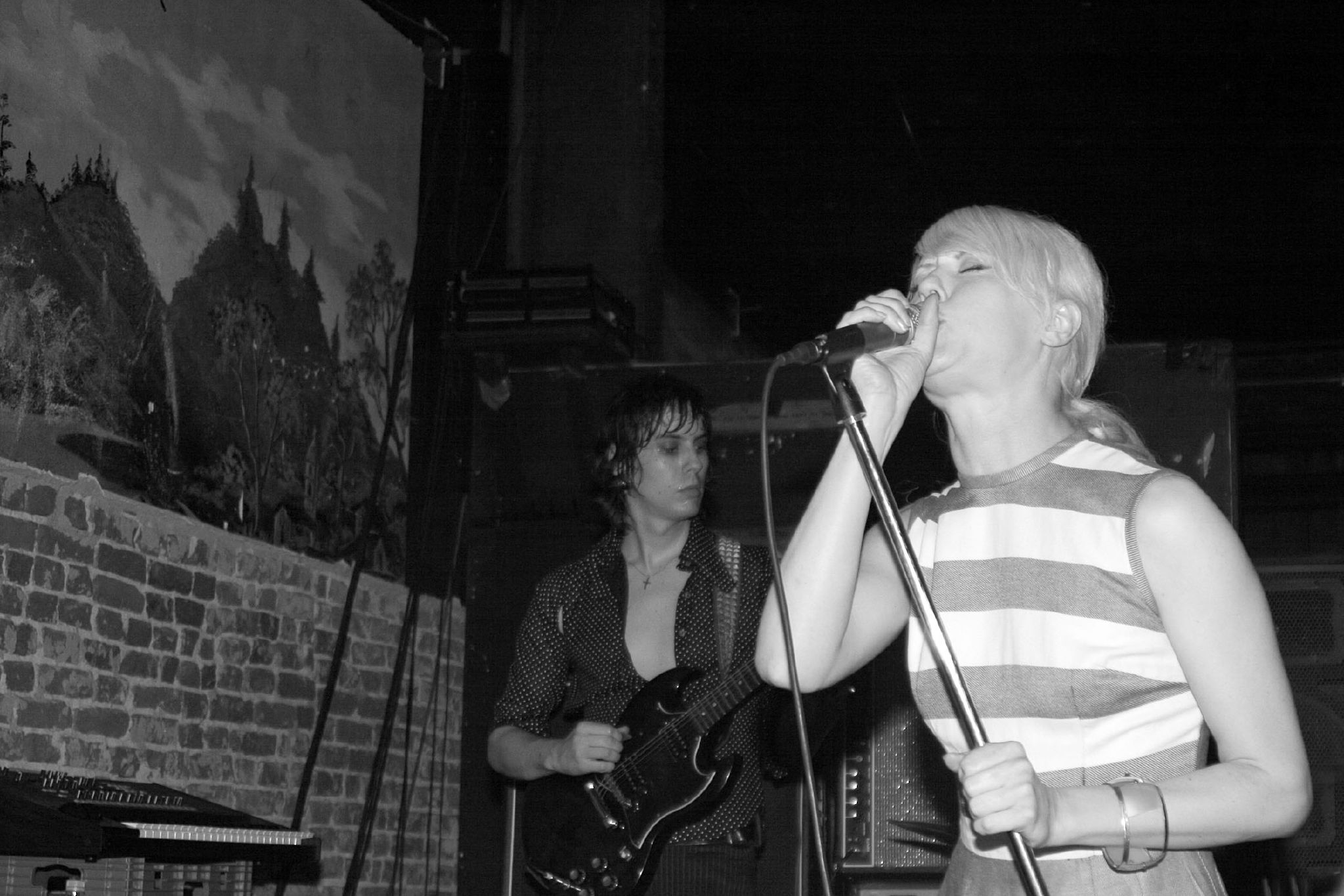
- Glass Candy performing at The Smell in Los Angeles on May 21, 2006. From left to right: Johnny Jewel, Ida No

Background information
- Also known as: Glass Candy and the Shattered Theatre
- Origin: Portland, Oregon, U.S.
- Genres: Electropop; synth-pop; Italo disco; electro-disco; electro-rock; dance-punk (early); art punk (early); glam punk (early)
- Years active: 1996–2019
- Labels: K; Troubleman Unlimited; Italians Do It Better
- Past members: Ida No; Johnny Jewel; Avalon Kalin; Jimi Hey; Dusty Sparkles; Mark Burden; Ginger Peachs

Glass Candy was an American electronic music duo from Portland, Oregon, formed in 1996 by vocalist Ida No and producer and multi-instrumentalist Johnny Jewel. The band is part of the Italians Do It Better label. While the band's early work blends elements of no wave, art punk, and glam rock, their later work incorporates synth-pop and Italo disco.

The band has evolved consistently through the years since their original collaboration, and experimenting with various musical styles. They have released a number of albums since the early 2000s, their most recent full-length being the B-side compilation album Deep Gems (2008). In 2010, the band released the six-song EP Feeling Without Touching. The band was working on their upcoming third studio album, Body Work, but with no information on the progress of the record before going on hiatus.

== History ==
=== 1996–2002: Beginnings ===
Glass Candy was formed in Portland, Oregon by Ida No (born Lori Monahan), from Vancouver, Washington, and Johnny Jewel (born John Padgett), from Austin, Texas, in 1996. The two met the year before at a Fred Meyer grocery store where Jewel worked in Portland. They soon began producing music under the name Glass Candy and the Shattered Theatre.

No describes the band's early work as "droney and weird." Their early releases drew heavily from no wave, post-punk, and art rock, as evidenced in their self-released first three singles, "Brittle Women" (1999), "Metal Gods" (2001) and a cover of Josie Cotton's "Johnny Are You Queer" (2002). They toured with The Convocation Of... in 2001, and released a live album that year on the Vermin Scum record label.

=== 2003–2010: Love Love Love and B/E/A/T/B/O/X ===
Their debut studio album, Love Love Love, was issued on Troubleman Unlimited Records in 2003. In 2006, Jewel founded Italians Do It Better with Mike Simonetti as a subsidiary of Troubleman. In October 2007, Glass Candy released their second studio album B/E/A/T/B/O/X on Italians Do It Better to considerable critical praise. THe followin year, the albums track "Digital Versicolor" was featured prominently in Nicolas Winding Refn's 2008 film Bronson, partially in a pair of scenes, and in full over the closing credits. In 2016, the albums track "Candy Castle" was used in the season one finale of the HBO series Westworld.

A compilation album titled Deep Gems was released in late 2008, containing rarities, B-sides, and remixes. In a review of Deep Gems, Spin magazine referred to the band as an "[e]ccentric Portland pair" that "spook the dance floor". Also in 2008, Glass Candy's songs were used for a Chloé runway show, as well as used by Karl Lagerfeld for the Spring/Summer '08 Chanel Haute Couture fashion show and the Fall/Winter show of '08/'09.

An unofficial music video was made for the song in 2007 and starred Australian actress Rose Byrne.

On February 16, 2010, the band released the six-song EP Feeling Without Touching.

=== 2011–2015: Body Work and commercial use ===
Glass Candy revealed the title of their third studio album, Body Work, in September 2010, with No stating the title is "a tribute to acupuncture, yoga, Rolfing." It was preceded by the single "Warm in the Winter" on September 1, 2011, containing the B-side "Beautiful Object". A video for the track "Halloween", another teaser from the album, premiered on October 28, 2011, and is a homage to John Carpenter's 1978 film of the same name. The music video for "Warm in the Winter" was released on November 6, 2011.

"Warm in the Winter" was used in Balenciaga's Fall/Winter 2012/2013 fashion show, as well as in advertising campaigns and short films for companies such as Lucky Brand Jeans and Red Bull. In November 2012, Glass Candy was invited to perform at a private Chanel party in Berlin on November 20, 2012 to celebrate the release of Karl Lagerfeld's book The Little Black Jacket. Symmetry, Jewel's instrumental project with Nat Walker, opened the evening with an atmospheric 80-minute set leading up to Lagerfeld's arrival.

In 2013, Glass Candy performed at a variety of private fashion/runway events in South America, North America, Europe, and Asia. The band also performed worldwide at a variety of music festivals, including Pitchfork in Paris and Primavera Sound in Spain. In July 2013, Jewel told Exclaim! that he was still working on Body Work, stating, "I have 17 sets of lyrics and vocals that we recorded that are just incredible." On August 5, 2013, Glass Candy released a music video for the song "Redheads Feel More Pain", which appears on the Italians Do It Better compilation album After Dark 2.

The duo released a cover version of Herb Alpert's 1979 instrumental track "Rise" via SoundCloud on December 4, 2014.

"Warm in the Winter" was also featured in the opening scene of the pilot episode of Fox's dark comedy slasher series Scream Queens in 2015. From 2015–2018, "Warm in the Winter" was used in Air France's advertising campaign "France is in the Air", as well as their pre-safety flight video.

=== 2018–2019: Warm in the Winter lawsuit and final EP's ===
In 2018, Australian songwriter Harry Vanda filed a lawsuit with late George Young's estate Boomerang Investments against both Glass Candy, members Johnny Padgett (Jewel) and Lori Monahan (No), Kobalt Music Publishing, and Air France for copyright infringement over their single "Warm in the Winter", and its use in Air France's "France is in the Air" campaign, claiming the band knowingly copied the melody and lyrics to John Paul Young's 1977 song "Love Is In The Air", which Vanda and Young co-wrote. In 2020, Australian judge Nye Perram ruled that Boomerang Investments was entitled to damages for digital downloads of "Warm In The Winter".

In 2019, five years after their last release "Rise", Glass Candy digitally released their final EPs "Naked City" and "The Beat's Alive", before No created the group Fawn with former Chromatics member Nat Walker in 2022.

== Musical style ==
No's vocals have been likened to 1960s German singer Nico and "a frightened Debbie Harry or a pissed-off Lene Lovich in a haunted disco". Their work as of 2008 borrows from Italo disco, freestyle music, Krautrock, hip hop, and new wave.

Jewel has cited Marilyn Monroe films, 1980s cop show soundtracks, Goblin, and John Carpenter soundtracks as influences. All music tracks are produced by basic analog equipment, without the use of computers. Critics have also compared the group to Nina Hagen, the Shirelles, David Bowie, James Chance, and Jarboe. Glass Candy has covered songs by James "Sugar Boy" Crawford, Kraftwerk, Roxy Music, Belle Epoque, Dark Day, the Rolling Stones, and Queen. The group has also said that stores could appropriately file their music "between Olivia Newton-John, Suicide and Schoolly D".

== Members ==
Final members

- Ida No – vocals
- Johnny Jewel (formerly known as John David P.) – guitar, bass, synthesizers, drums, programming

Former members

- Avalon Kalin – drums
- Jimi Hey – drums
- Dusty Sparkles – saxophone, drums
- Mark Burden – drums
- Ginger Peachs – drums

== Discography ==
=== Studio albums ===
- Love Love Love (2003, Troubleman Unlimited)
- B/E/A/T/B/O/X (2007, Italians Do It Better)

=== Albums sold during tours ===
- Demos 31, 37 (2001)
- Demos 5.31.2002 (2002)
- The Nite Nurses (2005)
- Music Dream (2006)

=== Compilation albums ===
- Deep Gems (2008, Italians Do It Better)

=== Extended plays ===
- Smashed Candy (2001, Vermin Scum)
- Iko (2005, Troubleman Unlimited)
- Feeling Without Touching (2010, Italians Do It Better)
- Naked City (2019, Italians Do It Better)
- The Beat's Alive (2019, Italians Do It Better)

=== Singles ===
- "Brittle Women" (1999, self-released; re-released as "Bräckliga Kvinnor" in 2003 by Troubleman Unlimited)
- "Metal Gods" (2001, self-released)
- "Love on a Plate" (2002, Troubleman Unlimited)
- "Excite Bike" (2003, Troubleman Unlimited)
- "Life After Sundown" (2004, Troubleman Unlimited)
- "I Always Say Yes" (2007, Troubleman Unlimited)
- "Miss Broadway" (2007, Italians Do It Better)
- "Digital Versicolor" (2007, Italians Do It Better)
- "Geto Boys" (2009, Italians Do It Better)
- "Warm in the Winter" (2011, Italians Do It Better)
- "The Possessed" (2013, Italians Do It Better)
- "Rise" (2014, Italians Do It Better)

=== Miscellaneous ===
- I Always Say Yes (2006, Italians Do It Better)
