= Johnny Jewel =

American musician, record producer, and visual artist (born 1974)

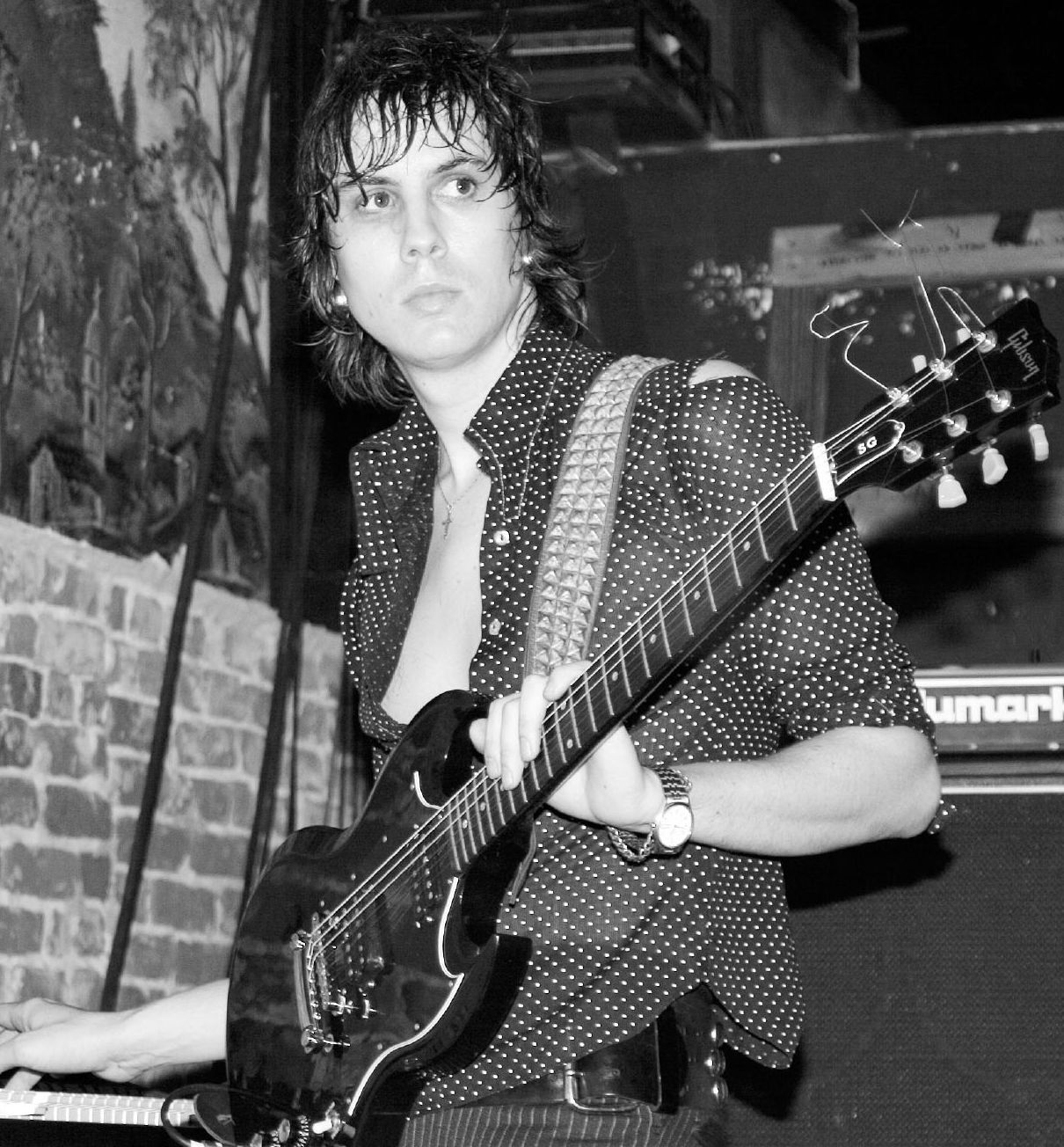
- Jewel performing with Glass Candy in 2006

Background information
- Also known as: John David V, For Every River Buried, Twenty-Six, Achille Vettessi
- Born: John David Padgett; May 31, 1974 (age 52); Houston, Texas, U.S.
- Genres: Electronic; ambient; synthwave; film score; synth-pop
- Occupations: Record producer; composer; bassist; keyboardist
- Instruments: Bass guitar; synthesizer; keyboards; vocals; guitar; drum machine; vocoder; programming
- Years active: 1994–present
- Label: Italians Do It Better

Johnny Jewel (born John David Padgett; May 31, 1974) is an American musician, record producer, composer, and visual artist. He is a multi-instrumentalist who is known for using all-analog equipment. Jewel has been recording and releasing material since the mid-1990s.

Born in Houston, Jewel mainly began recording music in Portland, Oregon in 1996 after forming the band Glass Candy with vocalist Ida No. Initially boasting a no wave-influenced sound, the band evolved into an electronic-based duo featuring elements of Italo disco. In 2006, Jewel founded the independent Portland-based record label Italians Do It Better, which features an array of artists and groups that produce similar disco, electronic, and synth-based music. Among the label's artists are Glass Candy, Chromatics and Desire, all of whom Jewel wrote, recorded, and performed with.

With Jewel's involvement, Chromatics achieved considerable commercial success with the album Night Drive (2007), and their music was later featured in Nicolas Winding Refn's film Drive (2011). In addition to Drive, Jewel also scored Refn's film Bronson (2008), as well as Ryan Gosling's directorial debut, Lost River (2015). Additionally, between 2014 and 2018, Jewel released three solo albums, largely consisting of instrumental material.

== Biography ==
=== Early life ===
Jewel was born John David Padgett in 1974 in Houston, Texas, where he was also raised. His father was partially deaf, and Jewel learned sign language to help communicate with him. As a teenager, Jewel was a "creative misfit" who was inspired by the music of The Velvet Underground and Sonic Youth. At age 17, Jewel was the victim of a kidnapping, which he stated marked a pivotal moment in his life.

Jewel was a prospective student at Rice University, but ultimately decided to forgo attending college. At age eighteen, his father died, after which he relocated from Houston to Austin.

=== Career beginnings and Glass Candy ===
In Austin, Jewel began recording music under the name John David V. He subsequently relocated to Portland, Oregon in the mid-1990s, where he continued to record music, this time under the name Johnny Jewel. In 1996, while working at a Fred Meyer grocery store in Portland, Jewel met Ida No (born Lori Monahan), a local from Vancouver, Washington, who also worked in the store.

At the time, Jewel was in the midst of a breakup, and was being kicked out of his apartment. "I had a suitcase with clothes and five Moogs, and it was horrible. So the second time I hung out with [Ida], I called her and was like, 'Can I move in with you?' And she's like, 'Uh, sure.'" The two formed the musical group Glass Candy (initially known as Glass Candy and the Shattered Theatre), and began producing music together. They soon began producing music under the name Glass Candy and the Shattered Theatre. No described their early work as "droney and weird," drawing on elements of no wave, post-punk, and art rock.

Also in 1996, under the alias Twenty Six, he released a post-rock album, This Skin Is Rust, on Bobby J Records.

In 2003, Glass Candy released their debut studio album, Love Love Love, on the independent Troubleman Unlimited Records.

=== Italians Do It Better ===
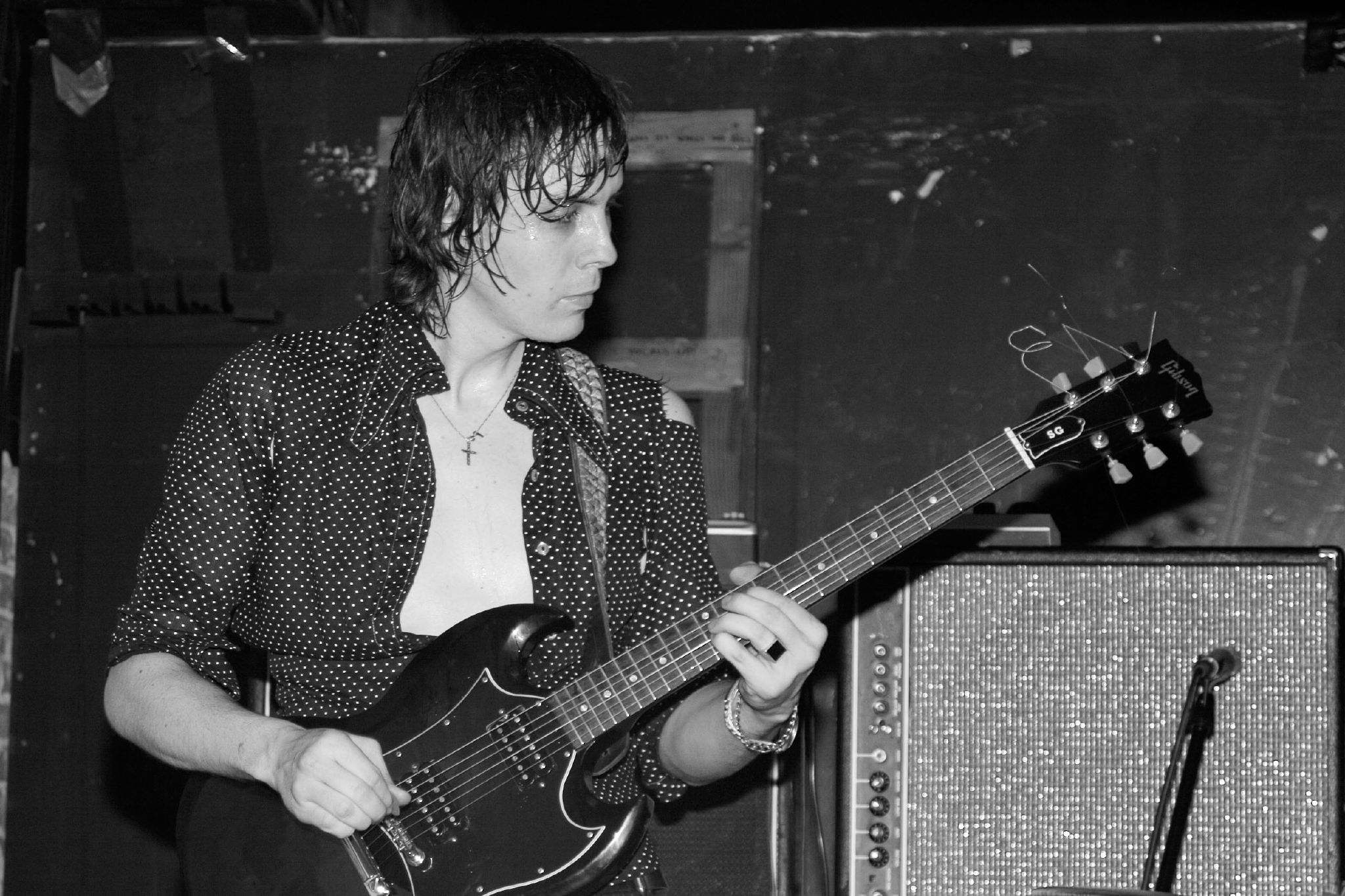
Jewel performing with Glass Candy in Los Angeles, 2008

In 2006, Jewel formed his own record label, Italians Do It Better, based out of Portland, along with Mike Simonetti. Commenting on his decision to form the label, he said:

One of the reasons why I started Italians Do It Better is because I didn't want someone telling me when a record was due, or when something needed to be written or recorded. Or when I needed to go on tour. I believe in doing things when it's ready. It's a dangerous game because the world is moving so fast. But ultimately the only reason we're having this conversation is because I love music. And that's the path that it's led me on in my life. I never set out to be a successful musician, but musical decisions have always guided my life. For that reason, I will stay true to what I really feel…

Italians Do It Better began releasing material from a number of independent artists, featuring music inspired by electronic music, Italo disco, glam rock, and punk. Among the groups signed to the label were Glass Candy, Desire, and Chromatics, each of whom Jewel collaborated with musically, co-writing and recording material. The label issued two compilation albums featuring music from its various artists, After Dark (2007), and later, After Dark 2 (2013).

With Chromatics, a post-punk band that had previously been based in Seattle, Jewel introduced singer and guitarist Ruth Radelet, who replaced the group's former vocalist, Johnny Whitney. With Jewel's involvement, the group changed its sound significantly, introducing elements of electronic, disco, and synth-based music. Heather Phares, writing for AllMusic, described the band's trajectory: "After starting out as an abrasive post-punk band, Chromatics evolved into one of the most influential electro-pop acts of their kind... the group's evocative mix of Italo-disco, post-punk, and '80s pop was glamorous, heartbroken, and utterly distinctive."

=== Musical scoring and other projects ===
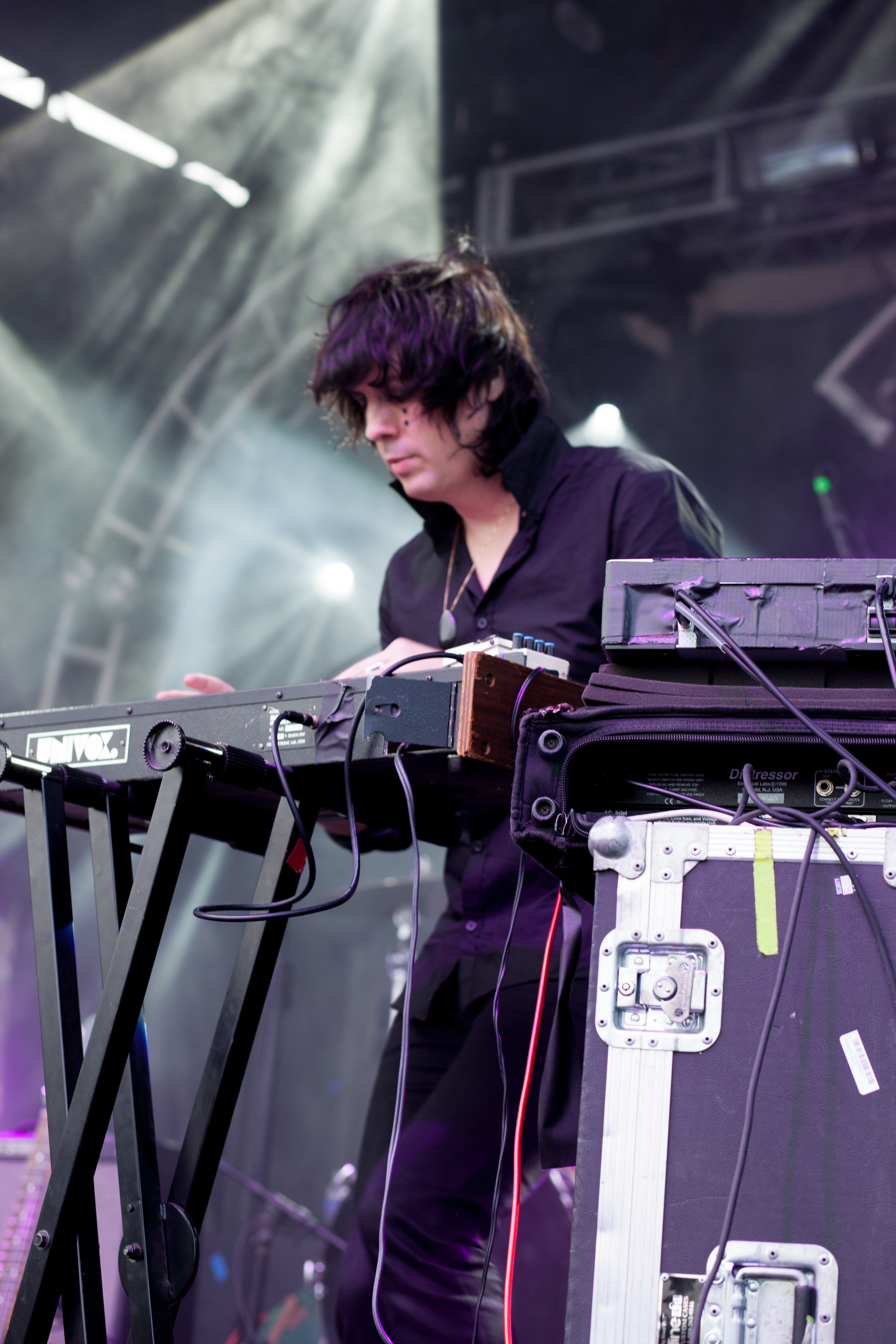
Jewel performing with Chromatics at Fun Fun Fun Fest, 2013

In 2008, Jewel made his debut as a film score composer, writing and performing the score for Nicolas Winding Refn's film Bronson. He was subsequently hired by Refn to compose the score for his subsequent film, Drive (2011). Tracks by Chromatics and Desire also appeared on the film's soundtrack.

In 2014, Mike Simonetti, the co-founder of Italians Do It Better, left the record label and started a new imprint named 2MR. In a series of public Twitter posts in 2016, Simonetti went on to accuse Jewel of stealing song ideas, among several other accusations regarding money Simonetti alleged was owed to him.

In 2014, Jewel recorded the score for the A&E crime drama series Those Who Kill (2014). The same year, he released an instrumental album under his own name: The Other Side of Midnight (2014), The same year, Chromatics announced that they were recording a new album, entitled Dear Tommy.

Jewel subsequently scored the feature film Lost River (2015), the directorial debut of Ryan Gosling (who had starred in Drive). He then composed the score for Fien Troch's film Home (2016), for which he won the Georges Delerue Award. In 2017, Jewel appeared with Chromatics in David Lynch's series Twin Peaks: The Return, a revival of the original 1990 series, in which the band performs in a bar. Also in 2017, Jewel released another solo record, Windswept, followed by Digital Rain in 2018.

The release of Chromatics' Dear Tommy was delayed several times, and in 2017, Jewel purportedly destroyed every copy of the record following a near-death experience in which he almost drowned while swimming in Hawaii. Despite this, Jewel continued to record with the band, covering the Hole track "Petals" (from their 1998 album, Celebrity Skin) for the official soundtrack of the 2018 horror film The Perfection.

In August 2021, singer Ruth Radelet, drummer Nat Walker, and guitarist Adam Miller of Chromatics announced that the group had disbanded. Jewel was not mentioned in the announcement, though a representative for Italians Do It Better released the statement: "Johnny is extremely proud of his work with the project over the years and he'll continue making music and supporting great art and artists through his label Italians Do It Better."

In 2023, Jewel again collaborated with Fien Troch, composing the score for her film Holly, which is scheduled to be screened at the 80th Venice International Film Festival. In 2025, Jewel produced the song Wake Me Up (The Weeknd and Justice song) on The Weeknd's album Hurry Up Tomorrow (album), alongside veteran producer Mike Dean (record producer) and French Electronic Duo Justice (band).

== Discography ==
Solo

- The Other Side of Midnight (2014, Italians Do It Better)
- Windswept (2017, Italians Do It Better)
- Digital Rain (2018, Italians Do It Better)
- Vapor (2018, Italians Do It Better)
- Themes for Television (2018, Italians Do It Better)

Film scores

- Bronson (2008)
- Lost River (2015, Italians Do It Better)
- A Beautiful Now (2016, Italians Do It Better)
- Home (2016, Italians Do It Better)
- Don't Come Back from the Moon (2017, Italians Do It Better)
- Zeroville (2019)
- Holly (2023, Italians Do It Better)

Extended plays

- The Hacker (2016, Italians Do It Better)
- The Key (2016, Italians Do It Better)
