= David Grellier =

French electronica musician

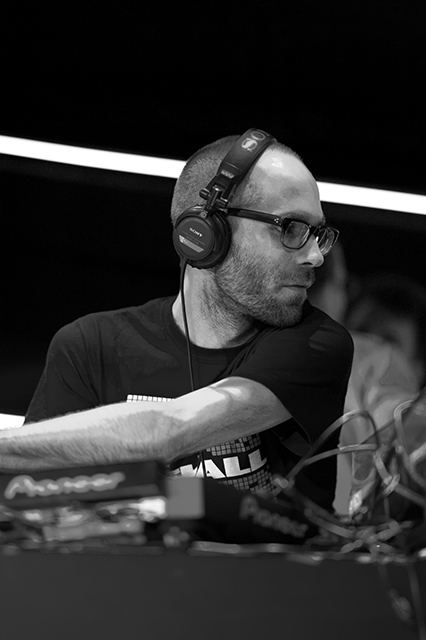

Background information
- Birth name: David Grellier
- Born: July 2, 1979 (age 46); Nantes, France
- Genres: Electronica, synthwave
- Occupation(s): Composer, Performer, Producer
- Years active: 2004–present
- Website: www.college-music.com

David Grellier (born July 2, 1979) is a French electronica musician and founder of the musical projects College (2005) and Valerie (2007). Under the stage name Mitch Silver, he is also a member of the electroclash band Sexy Sushi, active since 2004.

== Musical projects ==
=== College ===
College (Musical Project)
- Origin: Nantes, France
- Genres: Synth-pop, synthwave
- Years active: 2005–present
- Labels: FVTVR, Valerie
- Members: David Grellier

College, in Grellier's words, was an attempt "to synthesize into my music the emotions of my childhood" and was greatly influenced by American 1980s pop-culture, "80's soaps and an aesthetic which I particularly like: color, images, silvery films and the sun – images of Los Angeles, Chicago and all of the other cities that [...] continue to fascinate me" as well as artists including Daft Punk, Alan Braxe, Fred Falke, Lifelike, Jacques Lu Cont, Nicolas Makelberge, DJ Falcon, and John Carpenter.

In 2008, College released the album Secret Diary, alongside the EP Teenage Color. In 2011, the collective released a second album Northern Council. The same year, the song "A Real Hero," which College collaborated on with Canadian synth-pop group Electric Youth, was used in the soundtrack of the film Drive becoming a charting hit in France reaching #26. The following year the same song was included in the soundtrack of the film Taken 2.

On March 13, 2013, College released a third full-length album, Heritage, introducing a new series of live acts around the world accompanied by new visual content. French visual system artist Chromaphase cooperated for the Shanghai act.

On 10 October 2014, College announced their fourth EP Save The Day. The title track features vocals by Nola Wren. The official music video for "Save The Day" debuted on 9 November 2014. Jay Buim directed the music video, which has been described as "dark." Both the EP and music video are said to have been inspired by stalker films of the late 1970s and early 1980s.

=== Valerie ===
Valerie (Music Collective)
- Origin: Nantes, France
- Genres: Electro, "retro-futurist", 1980s music, synthwave
- Years active: 2007–present

The Valerie Collective described as "responsible for some of the very best original electronic music now coming out of France", was created as a way to foster musical talent, by providing opportunities for collaboration among artists, also connecting them through blogs and other internet channels. The collective is characterised by a "retro-futurist", "romantic blend of 1980s inspired electro" or synthwave.

The musical cooperation was founded in Nantes in 2007 by David Grellier and his friends and colleagues. Various acts in Valerie include The Outrunners, Minitel Rose, Anoraak, Maethelvin, all from Nantes as well as Russ Chimes from London and DVAS from Toronto. Other artists included Keenhouse and Electric Youth. The hymn of the collective is "West Coast Valerie", a remix of the TV series Côte Ouest.

Some of the works are released under the Valerie own record label, whereas others are released under various labels like FVTVR, Endless Summer Recordings, Believe Digital, Flexx, Free Danger. The label Endless Summer Recordings also prepared a compilation album in 2009 entitled Valerie and Friends joining a great number of artists in the project.

In 2019 Grellier, appeared in the documentary film The Rise of the Synths, appearing alongside Maethelvin and various other composers from the Synthwave scene, including filmmaker John Carpenter who also narrated the film which explored the origins and growth of the synthwave genre.

=== Sexy Sushi ===
Under the pseudonym stage name Mitch Silver, David Grellier is a member of Sexy Sushi, a French electroclash band he formed with vocalist Rebeka Warrior (real name Julia Lanoë). She is also part of the band Mansfield.TYA . Their first albums were released as burned CD-R by alternative distributors like Wonderground. An EP and an album were then released in 2009 by Scandale Records.

== Discography ==
=== As College ===
- 2008: Secret Diary (album, FVTVR label)
- 2008: Teenage Color (EP, Valerie Records)
- 2009: A Real Hero (EP, Flexx label)
- 2011: Secret Diary Remixed (EP, FVTVR label)
- 2011: Northern Council (album, Valerie label)
- 2013: Heritage (album, Valerie Records)
- 2014: Save The Day (EP, Valerie Records)
- 2016: Old Tapes (album, Valerie Records)
- 2017: Shanghai (album, Lakeshore Records, Invada Records)

=== As Valerie Collective ===
- Compilation:
  - Valerie and Friends Compilation (2009, Endless Summer Recordings)
- College:
  - Secret Diary (2008 album, FVTVR label)
  - Teenage Colour (2008 EP, Believe Digital)
  - A Real Hero (2008 EP, Flexx label)
- College/The Outrunners:
  - Teenage Colour/Cool Feeling (7", Free Danger label)
- Minitel Rose:
  - The French Machine (2008 album, FVTVR label)
  - Atlantic (2010 album, FVTVR label)
- Anoraak:
  - Nightdrive With You (EP, Endless Summer Recordings)
  - Nightdrive With You Remixes (EP, Endless Summer Recordings)
  - Wherever the Sun Sets (2010 Naïve Records)

=== As part of Sexy Sushi ===
- 2004: Défonce ton ampli (CDR, Merdier Records / Wonderground)
- 2005: J'en veux j'en veux des coups de poing dans les yeux (CDR, Merdier Record / WonDerGround Distribution)
- 2005: Caca (CDR, Merdier Records / Wonderground)
- 2006: Ça m’aurait fait chier d’exploser (CDR, Merdier Records / Wonderground)
- 2008: Marre Marre Marre (Believe)
- 2009: EP Des jambes (SV03, Scandale Records)
- 2009: Tu l'as bien mérité (SC002, Scandale Records)
- 2010: Château de France
- 2010: Cyril (L'autre distribution)
- 2011: Mauvaise foi
- 2011: Flamme
- 2013: Vous n'allez pas repartir les mains vides ?
- 2014: Vous en reprendrez bien une part ?
