= Laura Fares =

Laura Fares "LAU"
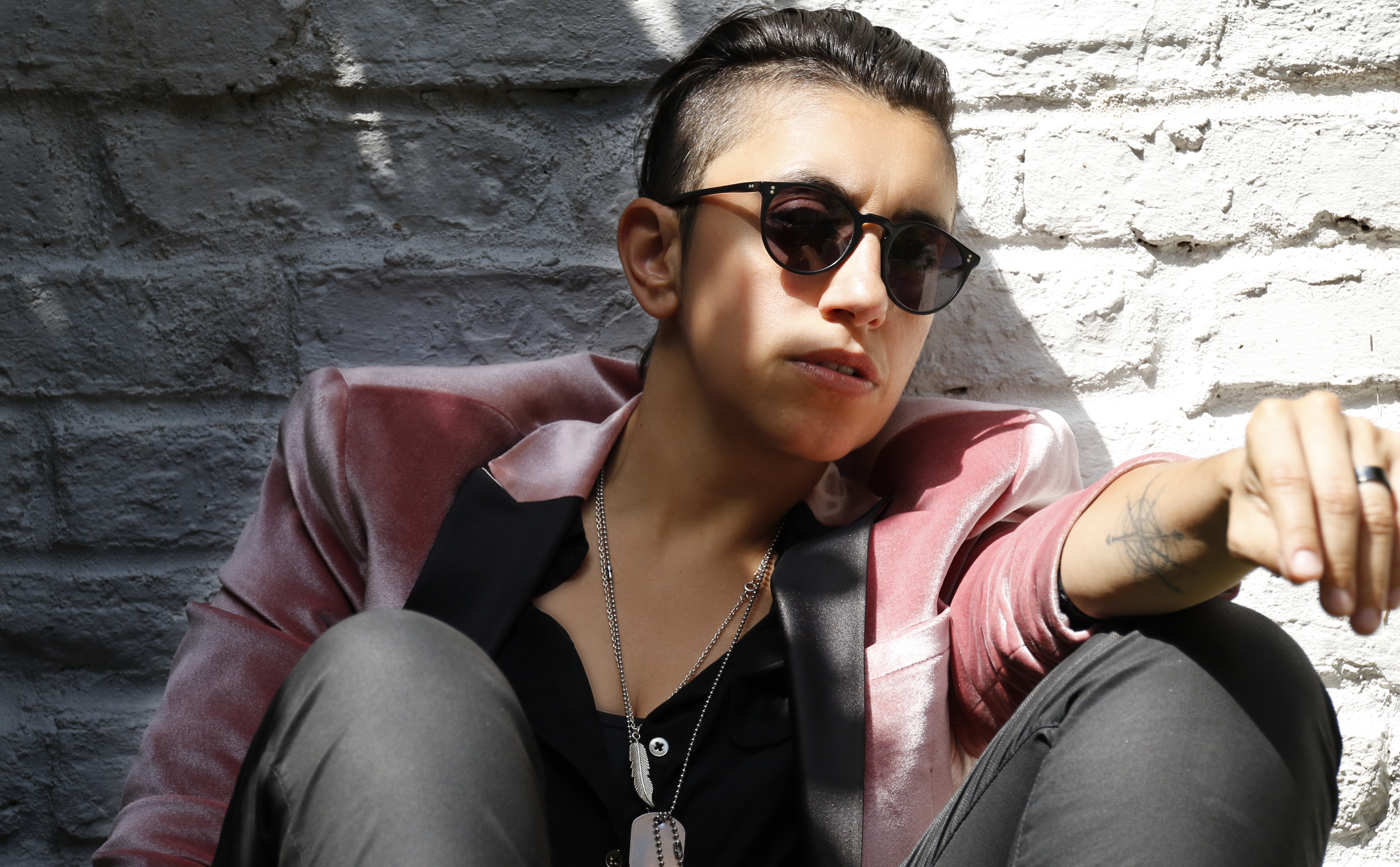

Background information
- Also known as: LAU or Lau Fares
- Born: 1978 (age 47–48); Buenos Aires
- Genres: Synthpop/Synthwave/Retrowave
- Occupations: Singer, Songwriter, Drummer, Producer
- Instruments: Drums, Guitar, Synths
- Years active: 1995-
- Label: Aztec Records
- Website: www.laufares.com

Laura Fares (born February 14, 1978, Buenos Aires), known as LAU or Lau Fares, is an Argentine singer-songwriter, drummer, and producer from Argentina, and currently based in Barcelona (Spain), after 21 years in the United Kingdom. She is also the founder of Aztec Records with Ariel Amejeiras.

== Biography ==
Self taught as a drummer and guitarist from the age of 17, she formed her first music band in Argentina, called Isis. Based in the UK between 1999 and 2020, LAU studied music at City & Islington College and got a degree in Popular Music Performance at the London College of Music & Media, through Thames Valley University and Drumtech. Soon after finishing her degree, LAU went off on tour as a session drummer for different pop stars like Jont, Sam Sparro, Taio Cruz, Ricky Martin, Clean Bandit, The Wanted, Big Black Delta and others, opening for artists like Robyn, Adele, The Presets and One Direction. She became a songwriter simultaneously and was first published by Oval Music, funded by legendary BBC Radio Charlie Gillett and mentored by BBC music composer David Lowe.

She was co-founder of Disco Damage in 2007, and professional DJ since 2008. She set up independent Synthpop/synthwave record label Aztec Records in 2010 with her friend Ariel Amejeiras, where she is the Creative Director. Synthpop/synthwave is a sub-genre determined by modern electronic music and nostalgia for the pop culture of the 80s. The label has developed and released artists such as Bright Light Bright Light, NINA, Sunglasses Kid, Bunny X and many others.

In 2010 LAU teamed up with NINA to write two albums: Sleepwalking and Synthian, which took them on several tours around the world, including opening for Erasure in 2014 on their Violet Flame Tour in the United States. The duo also co-wrote a song called "The Wire", which was remixed by Ricky Wilde and had Kim Wilde featuring on it. The writing duo also remixed five tracks from the Drive soundtrack by Cliff Martinez, released by Lakeshore Records in 2020. The duo also appeared in the London movie premiere for The Rise of the Synths, where their songs were used.

== Solo career ==
In 2020 LAU launched her solo project as a retrowave/synthpop singer and songwriter and released four singles, ahead of her debut album 'Believer' released in February 2021. LAU's debut album includes Synthwave, Retrowave and Synth-pop tracks with a heavy 80s influence, and talks about a bad breakup, moving on from a past relationship and believing in herself after so many years behind other artists, as mentioned on Billboard.

LAU's second studio album 'Circumstance' was released on February 14, 2022, and includes tracks produced by Brian Skeel, Ends 84, TAKTA, Popcorn Kid, Saint Innocent and her own version of the Cyndi Lauper classic 'True Colors', produced by Zak Vortex. The album talks about the uncertainty of a distant relationship and falling in love in the times of pandemic, as she explained on Mixmag. The album includes Synth-pop, Retrowave and Nu-Disco songs.

In 2022 LAU's track 'Stunning' was used on the "Frozen Flowers" Victoria's Secret ad campaign, featuring Hailey Bieber.

That same year LAU was selected by industry experts as one of the 76 artists chosen for Keychange, a European programme that promotes and empowers women and gender minorities in the music industry. That same year, LAU's album 'Believer' was nominated for the Spanish MIN awards in these categories: Best Album, Best Artist, Song of the Year, Best Producer and Best Graphic Design.

== Awards ==
Amazon Music BIME Equity Awards 2022 (Best Song) - Finalist

MIN Awards 2021 and 2022 (Best Song and Best Album) - Nominated

Give Her Your Love (Best Music Video)

2022 Winner: International Queer Film Festival

2022 Winner: PARAI Musical International Awards

2022 Winner: Bluez Dolphins International Short Film Fest

2022 Official Selection: Black Panther International Short Film Festival

2022 Official Selection: Barcelona Indie Filmmakers Festival

2022 Official Selection: Madrid Indie Film Festival

2022 Official Selection: Brighton Rocks Film Festival

2022 Official Selection: Buenos Aires International Film Festival

2022 Official Selection: Los Angeles Lift-Off Film Festival

2022 Official Selection: Prague International Film Awards

== Discography ==
=== Singles ===
==== As lead artist ====
- 2020: "Stunning"
- 2020: "We Had Magic"
- 2020: "Recognise"
- 2020: "True"
- 2021: "The Cards"
- 2021: "True Colors" (with Zak Vortex)
- 2021: "Undecided"
- 2021: "Give Her Your Love"
- 2021: "What To Do"
- 2022: "Instant Sunshine"
- 2022: “Shout” (with LLUVA)
- 2022: “Walk Away” (with Space Tourist)
- 2023: “Maneater” (with R3ZMA)
- 2023: "Wicked Game" (with The Last Concorde)
- 2024: "Laser Eyes" (with AKRAS)
- 2024: "Drifting Away" (with AKRAS)
- 2024: "The Storm"
- 2024: "Physical Attraction"
- 2025: "La Vida En Miami (Original Music from VICE UNDERCOVER Game)"
- 2025: "The King of Miami (Original Music from VICE UNDERCOVER Game)"

==== As featured artist ====
- 2020: "Get Up" (Jordan F feat. NINA and LAU)
- 2020: "Free Forever" (Popcorn Kid & LAU)
- 2021: "Bad Thing" (Sight Telma Club & LAU)
- 2021: "Drown Your Sorrow" (Maxx Parker & LAU)
- 2021: "Never" (Syntronix & LAU)
- 2021: "The Waves" (LLUVA & LAU)
- 2021: “We Gave It A Try” (Popcorn Kid & LAU)
- 2022: “Impossible Love” (LLUVA & LAU)
- 2022: “Galaxy” (EhRah & LAU)
- 2022: “Give Me A Sign” (EhRah & LAU)
- 2022: “Find Love” (Jessy Mach & LAU)
- 2022: “Irracional” (The Broken Flowers Project & LAU) - in Spanish
- 2024: "Works Of Art" (EhRah, LAU & Lafanki)
- 2024: "Electrified" (Bunny X, LAU & Fulvio Colasanto)
- 2024: "Everything I Want" (EhRah & LAU)

=== Albums ===
==== As lead artist ====
- 2021: Believer
- 2021: Believer (Deluxe)
- 2022: Circumstance
- 2022: Circumstance (The Remixes)
- 2023: Circumstance (Take Two)
- 2024: Digital Dream
- 2025: Digital Dream (Remixes)

==== As featured artist ====
- 2018: Sleepwalking (NINA feat. LAU)
- 2020: Synthian (NINA feat. LAU)
- 2020: Synthian (The Remixes) (NINA feat. LAU)
- 2020: Control EP (NINA feat. LAU)
