= Anoraak =

French musician

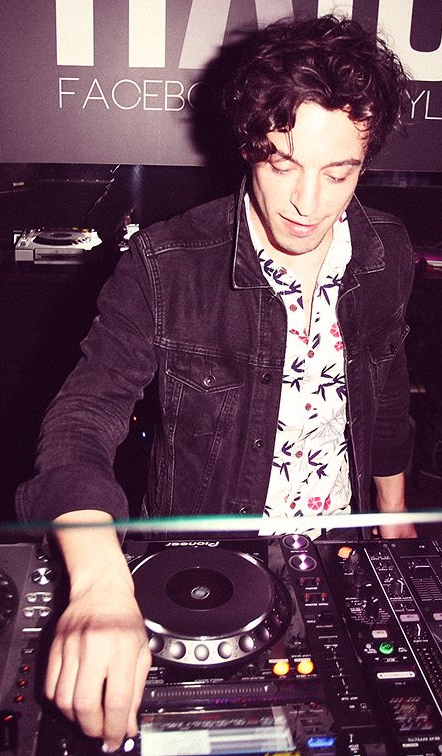
- Anoraak playing a DJ set in Valencia, Spain in 2014

Background information
- Origin: France
- Genres: Synthpop, Synthwave, Indie dance, Nu-Disco, Dream Pop, Italo disco, Disco, House
- Instruments: Guitar, synthesizer, drums, bass
- Years active: 2008–present
- Labels: Endless Summer; Valerie; Kitsuné; Eskimo Recordings; Grand Blanc; Naïve; Partyfine; Paper Recordings; BE Records
- Members: Frédéric Rivière
- Past members: Baudouin Marnez, Guillaume Marnez
- Website: anoraak.com

Anoraak is the musical project of French musician Frédéric Rivière, multi instrumentalist, singer, producer and DJ, former drummer of Pony Pony Run Run and member of the Valerie Collective along with artists such as College, Maethelvin, The Outrunners, Minitel Rose and Russ Chimes. Coming from the rock scene at first, he later came to electronic music, starting Anoraak beside his drummer position.

His music is related to the retro-synth and 80's inspired scenes recently highlighted by the movie Drive's soundtrack. His sound is described as "dreamy synth-filled tracks that fall somewhere on the spectrum between disco and new wave", "contemporary but retro-tinged" or "easy, breezy [...] chugging along on airy synthesizers like a weekend train to the beachside town of Nantes". Now his music is considered as "70s inspired disco [...]. Borrowing influences from pop, disco, house, and indie"

Anoraak has collaborated with artists such as the former Swedish Italo Disco outfit Sally Shapiro, American singer Slow Shiver, French producer College, Danish singer Lydmor, and has also remixed numerous artists such as Neon Indian, Mika, Junkie XL, Wild Belle, Julian Perretta, among others.

== Career ==
Rivière started Anoraak circa 2008, when he released his debut album Nightdrive With You, first limited to 1000 copies, then reissued in Japan and Australia. The title track "Nightdrive with You" touched the entire blogosphere, and got highlighted on the Myspace US homepage. He first started to perform in France, and eventually made it to the USA early 2009 with a first show at Webster Hall in New York.

Anoraak's second album Wherever The Sun Sets launched in 2011. UK's Clash Magazine review lauded Anoraak's mix of italo-disco, indie rock, and 80s pop, writing "he does it so well it’s as if these sounds were born to be together despite being totally disparate". Anoraak then grew up to a 3-piece band, playing renowned France's Festival des Inrocks, SXSW festival in Austin, Texas, Noise Music Festival in Monterrey, Mexico before embarking on The Drive Tour in 2012 with College and Electric Youth in USA and Canada.

In 2013, his third album Chronotropic came out, "lead[ing] the way in sunset-inspired dance pop" according to Nest HQ and described as "new wave vocals on disco" by French magazine Tsugi, quickly followed by the EP Reworks, alternative versions of tracks from the album, whose track Guest Star (Rework) was premiered on Rolling Stone. Back as a solo act, he keeps performing mostly stateside.

After releasing in 2015 the single Odds Are Good on the Belgian label Eskimo Recordings, he came back in 2016 with the EP Figure, out on his own imprint Endless Summer Music. The title track's video was premiered on British trendsetting site Nowness, and Brooklyn based online publication Vehllingo stated that this EP "embod[ies] the different personality traits of Anoraak’s various experiments over the years". The same year he teamed up with Anglo French duo Loframes for the track "Since You've Gone" released on Los Angeles based label Midnight in Paris

In 2015 he collaborates with French artist Étienne Bardelli to the conception of an art installation named Release, exhibited at the Palais de Tokyo in Paris, then at l'église des Trinitaires in Metz.

In June 2017, Anoraak released Black Gold Sun, described by Australian webzine Acid Stag as "Italo-disco, retro-synth, electro-pop goodness". The video for the track Last Call was premiered on major online French media Konbini.

He's on the bill for the 2018 edition of Electric Daisy Carnival in Mexico.

The same year he drops a remastered re-issue of his first album Nightdrive With You, enhanced by previously unreleased tracks and pressed on vinyl. In November 2019, Anoraak premiered a more nu-disco sound with "Panarea" on the Vehlinggo Presents: 5 Years compilation.

In 2020 Anoraak comes back along with songstress Sarah Maison on the 70's disco tinged EP Gang, released by Yuksek's label Partyfine. A few weeks later the single Between Love featuring Maria Uzor came out, followed by the EP Fire Inside in collaboration with Los Angeles-based artists Lauren Turk and Luxxury, out on Manchester's label Paper Recordings. Later that year Anoraak drops Transatlantic before unveiling Haunting Pieces, a new collaboration with French singer Lenparrot, out on Be Records, Bon Entendeur's imprint.

On May 28, 2021, Anoraak and Sarah Maison are back together on the single Karma, announcing a new EP.

In 2022, the single Two Steps was released on the Dutch label Enroute Records, followed by a new EP titled Farewell, featuring collaborations with the duo Mozambo and singer Samantha Alma Real. A new EP titled Hold Me Tonight was released in 2023, followed by a new single in collaboration with the Swedish singer Kiimchi, and a double collaboration with the Italian singer Elasi, with Che Caldo and Franco, both released on the Trident label. In 2024, a new collaboration with producer Un Deux and singer Keilimei titled "Moment" was released.

In 2025, Anoraak returns with a new 11-track album, Golden Hour. Released on the New York-based label Juliet Records, the label of the group Chromeo, this fourth album marks a return to the long format after more than a decade of singles and EPs. Surrounded by notable guests (Yan Wagner, Julia Jean-Baptiste, Fleur De Mur, Moona, and Julia Kwamya), Anoraak navigates between disco and electro-pop, sometimes drifting towards yacht-rock.

== Discography ==
=== Albums ===
- Nightdrive With You (2008, ESR / Grand Blanc)
- Wherever the Sun Sets (2010, Naïve / Grand Blanc)
- Chronotropic (2013, Grand Blanc)
- Golden Hour (2025, Juliet Records)

=== EPs ===
- Nightdrive With You Remixes (2008 - ESR / Grand Blanc)
- Try Me (2010, Grand Blanc)
- Crazy Eyes (2011, Grand Blanc)
- Behind Your Shades (2014, Grand Blanc)
- Reworks (2014, Grand Blanc)
- Endless Summer Versions (2014, Grand Blanc)
- Figure (2016, Endless Summer)
- Black Gold Sun (2017, Endless Summer)
- Black Gold Sun Remixed (2017, Endless Summer)
- Gang (2020, Partyfine)
- Fire Inside (2020, Paper Recordings)
- Karma (2021, Endless Summer)
- Farewell (2022, Endless Summer)
- Hold Me\Tonight (2023, Endless Summer)

=== Singles ===
- Nightdrive With You (2008 - ESR / Grand Blanc)
- Make It Better (Compilation "Edges" // 2009 - Because Music)
- Long Distance Hearts (Compilation "Valerie And Friends" // 2009 - Grand Blanc)
- Above Your Head (2010, Naïve)
- Try Me (2010, Naïve)
- Crazy Eyes (2011, Grand Blanc)
- Morning Light (2013, Grand Blanc)
- Behind Your Shades (2014 - Grand Blanc)
- Odds Are Good (2015 - Eskimo Recordings)
- We Lost feat. Slow Shiver (2016 - Endless Summer)
- Figure (2016 - Endless Summer)
- Evolve feat. Lydmor (2017 - Endless Summer)
- Last Call (2017 - Endless Summer)
- Favor (2018 - Endless Summer)
- Panarea (2019 - Vehlinggo)
- Gang (2020 - Partyfine)
- Between Love (2020 - Outside The Disco)
- Transatlantic (2020 - Endless Summer)
- Haunting Pieces (2020 - Bon Entendeur Records)
- Two Steps (2021 - Enroute Records)
- Own The Night (2023 - BE Records)
- Moment feat. Un Deux & Keilimei (2024 - Endless Summer)

=== Collaborations ===
- College - "Fantasy Park" on Secret Diary (2008 - Fvtvr / Valerie)
- Sally Shapiro - "Don’t Be Afraid" on Somewhere Else (2013 - Paper Bag Records)
- Etienne Bardelli & Frédéric Rivière - "Release" (2015 - Art installation - Palais de Tokyo)
- Loframes - "Since You've Gone" (2016 - Midnight in Paris)
- Elasi - Che Caldo (2023 - Trident)
- Elasi, Dumar - Franco (2023 - Trident)

=== Music Videos ===
- Above Your Head (2011 - Milosh Luczynski)
- Crazy Eyes (2011 - Jonathan Millet)
- Can't Stop (2011 - Frédéric Rivière)
- Made Up (2012 - Marjory Déjardin)
- Dolphins & Highways feat. Siobhan Wilson (2013 - Josué Pichot)
- Morning Light (2013 - Ben Chadourne)
- Behind Your Shades (2014 - O.S.A.K.A.H)
- Heart Out (2017 - Stephane Benini)
- Figure (2017 - Simon Savory)
- Last Call (2017 - O.S.A.K.A.H)
- Karma (2021 - Marco Dos Santos)
- Tell Me a Thing (2025 - Anoraak)
