= Shredder 1984 =

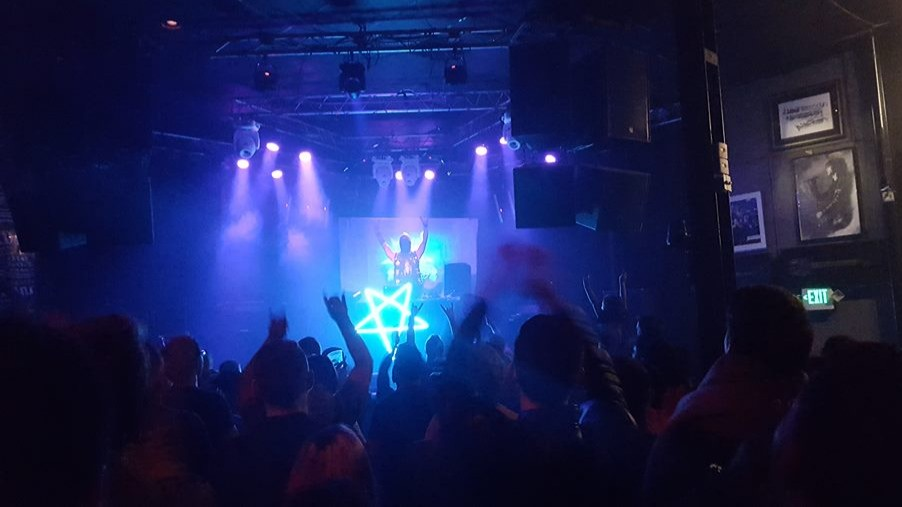
- Shredder 1984 live at Whisky A Go Go 2018

Background information
- Born: Steven Schriver
- Origin: France, United States
- Genres: Electronic, Synthwave, Darksynth, industrial, Electronic rock
- Years active: 2015–present
- Labels: Jet Set Trash Records; Future City Records
- Website: shredder1984.com

Steven Schriver, also known as Shredder 1984 is a French American electronic/synthwave artist and video producer.

His style is more defined as darksynth, a synthwave subgenre with more dark, powerful and tragic atmospheres, often inspired by 1970s and 1980s sci-fi and horror movies.

== Biography ==
Schriver initially made music in the metal scene and plays in Europe with the bands Can of Worms (thrash metal/death metal) and Silent Opera (progressive death metal). In 2015, he began playing synthwave and wrote and produced his first album Synth City, inspired by the cyberpunk culture and anime/manga such as Ghost in the Shell, Akira, and 1980s/1990s videogames like Saboteur, Beamrider or Final Fantasy VII.

== Musical career ==
Since 2016, Shredder 1984 has toured France and the United States. He plays in venues such as Saint Vitus in Brooklyn, Retro City Festival in Los Angeles, Turbo Drive synthwave night at the DNA Lounge in San Francisco and Whisky a Go Go in West Hollywood.

Shredder 1984 released his second album Dystopian Future in November 2017, and went on his California Tour 2018 where he started adding guitar parts, death growl on top of the synthesizers.

In April 2018, he appeared on the NIGHTWAV – A Synthwave Compilation released by the synthwave label Lazerdiscs Records and signed with the label Jet Set Trash Records who works with artists like Robert Parker and Daniel Deluxe for the release of his new EP Undead Thrasher. Shredder 1984 is part of the French Synthwave Compilation released in May 2018 by the label Last Rendez-Vous Records. He works in with FacexHugger for the release of his new album Sci-Fi Violence on the track In Space No One Can Hear The X where he plays guitar parts.

Shredder 1984 plays at the Human Music 2 in Newark and at the Beach City Synth, first all-synthwave event in South Florida and is currently working on his next album.

== Discography ==
=== EPs ===
- Undead Thrasher (April 2018, Jet Set Trash Records)

=== Albums ===
- Synth City (2016, auto-produced)
- Dystopian Future (November 2017, Future City Records)
- Nemesis (October 2018, Lazerdiscs Records)
- Resistance (December 2019, Lazerdiscs Records)
- Prophet of Doom (May 2020)
- Presence of Evil (October 2022)
- Doomsday Chronicles (December 2022)
- Dystopian Future (B-Side) (October 2023)

=== Compilations ===
- NIGHTWAV – A Synthwave Compilation (April 2018, Lazerdiscs Records)
- French Synthwave Compilation Vol.1 (May 2018, Last Rendez-Vous Records)

=== Other collaborations ===
- In Space No One Can Hear The X, Sci-Fi Violence by FacexHugger (guitar parts)
