= Telefuture Records =

North American record label

- Founded: 2010
- Founder: Steve Jenkins, Frank Martin
- Genre: Electronic Music, Synthwave, Chiptune
- Country of origin: United States
- Official website: www.telefuturenow.com at the Wayback Machine (archived 28 November 2019)

Telefuture Records is a North American record label located in the central coast of California with retro electronic music such as Synthwave and Chiptune as their main focus.

== History ==
Telefuture Records was founded in 2010 by Steve Jenkins and Frank Martin. With the love for the 80s inspired music that emerged during the 2010s, the label has since then released artists like Makeup and Vanity Set, Arcade High, Garth Knight, Robert Parker, Betamaxx, Waveshaper and Perturbator.

== Signed and previous artists ==
- Rico Zerone
- Mr Nissness
- Linde
- Makeup and Vanity Set
- Garth Knight
- Rolly Mingwald
- Collins
- Betamaxx
- Arcade High
- Ipower
- Vincenzo Salvia
- Nowtro
- Waveshaper
- Troxum
- Perturbator
- Bright Primate
- Protector 101
- Mild Peril
- Le Cassette
- Dead Astronauts
- LPOWER
- Monomer
- Shio-Z
- Marco Maiole
- Remute
- Robert Parker
- Bachelor of Hearts
