= Can of worms =

Can of worms is an idiom referring to a slew of subsequent problems and dilemmas arising from a decision or action. The phrase may also refer to:

== Transportation ==
- Can of Worms (interchange) in Rochester, New York
- Can of Worms (Minnesota interchange) in Duluth, Minnesota

== Media ==
- Can of Worms (film), a 1999 Disney Channel Original Movie
- Can of Worms (TV program), an Australian television talk show
- "Can of Worms", an episode of the animated television series Ninjago: Masters of Spinjitzu
- "Can of Worms" (Red Dwarf), an episode of Red Dwarf

== Books ==
- Can of Worms, a 1986 book by Evan Whitton
- Can of Worms, a novel by Kathy Mackel
- A Can of Worms, a 1987 novel by Russell H. Greenan
- "A Can of Worms", an essay by David Sedaris included in his 2004 collection Dress Your Family in Corduroy and Denim

== Music ==
- Can of Worms (band), a French death/thrash metal band
- "Can of Worms", a song by Buck 65 from Man Overboard

== See also ==
- Pandora's box
- Malfunction Junction (disambiguation)
- Spaghetti junction
