= Waveshaper (musician) =

Swedish electronic musician

Tom Andersson (born 26 September 1984), known professionally as Waveshaper, is a Swedish electronic musician specialising in synthwave. Inspired by artists like Jean-Michel Jarre, Kraftwerk and Daft Punk, as well as 80s movie soundtracks, his music is retrofuturistic and is composed with a variety of hardware synthesizers, including the ARP 2600, Roland Jupiter-4, and Korg MS-20. He released his debut album Tracks To The Future on the label Lunar Boogie in 2013, and the EP Sounds That Kill on Telefuture Records in 2014. In 2015, he released the four-track vinyl record Solar Drifter on the Swedish synthwave label Rad Rush Records.

Andersson also featured in the 2019 documentary film The Rise of the Synths which explored the origins and growth of the Synthwave genre, appearing alongside various other composers from the scene, including Carpenter Brut. John Carpenter also starred in and narrated the film.

== Discography ==
=== Albums ===
Year	Title	Record label	Notes
2013	Tracks To The Future	Lunar Boogie	
2014	Retro Future		Self released
2015	Exploration 84		Self released
2016	Station Nova	NewRetroWave	
2018	Lost Shapes		Self released
2019	Artifact		Self released
2021	Mainframe		Self released
2022	Forgotten Shapes		Self released
2024	A Void Hope		Self released
2026	Alternate Reality		Self released

=== EPs ===
Year	Title	Notes
2015	Solar Drifter	
2017	Velocity	

=== Singles ===
Year	Title	Album
2014	Dangerous Love	Retro Future
2014	So French Disco	Retro Future
2014	Radio Signal	Exploration 84
2015	Hardware Passion	Station Nova
2017	66 MHz	
2019	The Guardian	Artifact
2019	100 MHz	Artifact
2019	Data Source	
2020	CRT Days	
2020	The Disk Hunter	
2020	Vivid Stars	
2020	Walking in the Air	
2021	33 MHz	
2021	Eternal Journey (Station Nova Bonus)	
2021	Friends Again	Mainframe
2021	Lost in the Cloud	Mainframe
2021	The Phantom Machine (Movie Edit)	
2022	Gigabot	
2022	Terrabot	
2022	Pixel Force	
2022	Keep on Running	(From "In Search of Tomorrow")
2022	Disco on the Baltic Sea	Forgotten Shapes
2022	Commute	Forgotten Shapes
2022	Artificial Elements	Forgotten Shapes
2022	E.P.R.O.M. (w/ Oscillian)	
2023	Megabot	
2023	Exabot	
2023	Hearts	

=== Remix releases ===
Year	Title	Record label	Notes
2018	Lost Shapes Reinvented		Album - Self released
2020	Heard it On The Radio - Waveshaper Remix	Million Musique	Single
2020	Invincible - Remix	Joyful Noise Recordings & Magic Sword	Single
2020	I Drive (Waveshaper Remix [The Rise of the Synths Presents]	Lakeshore Records	Single
2021	Less Than Zero (feat. King Protea) [Waveshaper Remix]	FiXT	Single, Also provided instrumental track

=== Other ===
- Part of the soundtrack for Furi
- Remixed the song "Eden" for the 2016 synthwave album Scandroid
