= Zombie-Chang =

ZOMBIE-CHANG
- Born: Meirin Yung
- Origin: Yokohama, Japan
- Years active: 2013–present

Meirin Yung, known by her stage name Zombie-Chang, is a Japanese singer and model. Originally from Yokohama, she is now based in Tokyo.

== Career ==
Meirin released her debut Zombie-Change album in 2016, and her second album Gang! in 2017. Gang! was her major label debut. Also in 2017, she released "We Should Kiss". The single was described by The Fader as "a breathy should-be smash with an unshakeable bounce."

In 2018, her third album Petit Petit Petit was released. In 2020, her fourth album, Take Me Away from Tokyo was released.

In 2021, she released her single "PaRappa the Gabber" through Roman Label's Bayon Production. In May 2022, her STRESS de STRESS album was released. She is scheduled to go on tour for the album later in the year. In 2022, she performed at the Fuji Rock festival.

== Musical style ==
Yung's musical style has been described as "genre-blending"; on Zombie-Change she rapped "over new wave-derived beats". Later on Gang!, she delivered a performance that was J-pop-esque.

Yung was initially a folk singer, but her musical style eventually gravitated toward punk and rock. She discovered punk through listening to The Ramones. Her early music under her Zombie-Chang moniker was a blend of electro and lo-fi aesthetics. Yung has cited French bands Sexy Sushi, La Femme, and Salut C'est Cool as influences on her work.

Yung has stated that "her albums are full of memories and songs about personal experiences," and her music contains a mix of minimal electronic and live beats. She has experimented in a range of sounds from "ethereal psychedelic indie pop to live band arrangements and heavy dance."

== Discography ==
- Zombie-Change! (2016)
- Gang! (2017)
- Petit Petit Petit (2018)
- Take Me Away From Tokyo (2020)
- STRESS de STRESS (2022)
- GOOD PLACE (2025)
