= Nina (musician) =

German musician (born 1983)

NINA
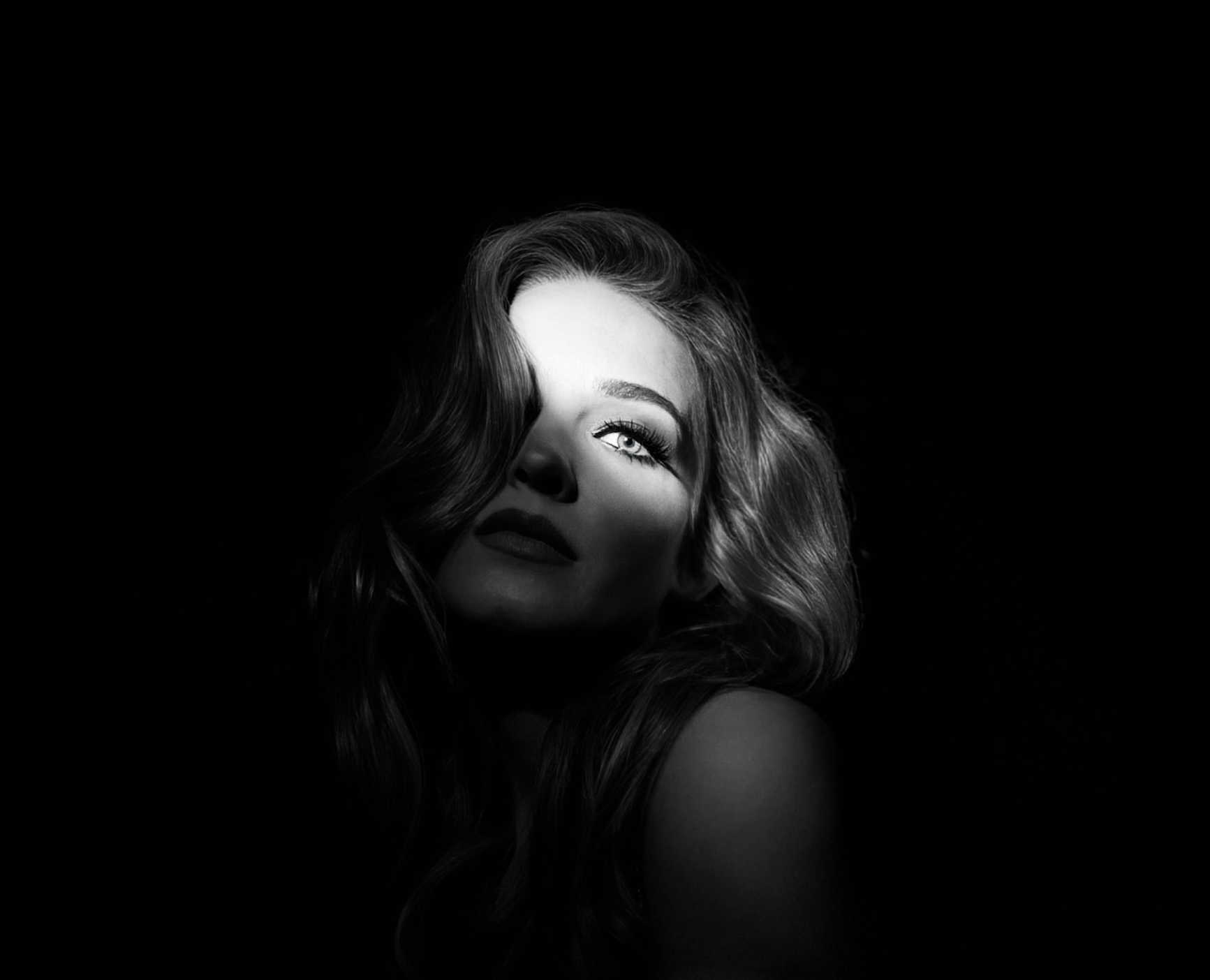

Background information
- Also known as: Nina Blair
- Born: Nina Boldt; West Berlin, West Germany
- Genres: Synthwave, electronic
- Occupation: Singer-songwriter
- Instruments: Vocals, synthesizer
- Years active: 2011–present
- Labels: Independent (NewRetroWave, Lakeshore Records, Italians Do It Better, Aztec Records)
- Spouse: Oliver Blair (married 2025–present)
- Website: iloveninamusic.com

Nina Boldt, known mononymously and professionally as NINA (born 29 September 1983) is a German singer-songwriter based in London and Berlin. Her music is a fusion of: pop, new wave and electronic music. She released her debut album Sleepwalking in 2018 and her follow-up album Synthian in 2020. Her third major release Control (feat. Laura Fares) was presented as an EP via Lakeshore Records and features samples from Cliff Martinez's film score for Drive, which began a mainstream modern revival of the cliche 1980s music, art and graphics scene.

== Career ==
Boldt was influenced by the music she heard on German radio during the 1980s, such as OMD. In 2014, Nina released the single "My Mistake" which was included in a compilation by Hugo Boss. Following the release of the single "We Are the Wild Ones", Nina performed four shows in Florida supporting British synth pop duo Erasure on "The Violet Flame" tour. She also performed at Liverpool Sound City music festival. "We Are the Wild Ones" was used in Syfy's TV series "Being Human". The official music video for the song was premiered by The Huffington Post. In 2015, "My Mistake" was used in a radio and TV commercial by Mercedes Benz; the song subsequently reached number 6 on Shazam's charts.

"Beyond Memory" was produced by Richard X and co-produced by Sunglasses Kid. The single was premiered by Idolator, who described it as "a slice of mid-tempo moodiness overflowing with Nina's longing, and Richard X's haunting synths". Idolator included "Beyond Memory" in the "Top 10 EPs & Mixtapes of 2016" list. "Beyond Memory" was played on BBC Introducing in July 2016. The EP features remixes by Ministry of Sound DJs Nilesh Parmar and Liam Keegan, as well as Swedish producer Oscillian.

Nina released her fourth single "One of Us" in collaboration with Metropolis Studios and M:UK label. The single was co-written by Nina, Laura Fares, and Oscillian and mixed by British audio engineer Liam Nolan. It was premiered by PopCrush who described it as similar to "Like A Virgin-era Madonna". That year, Nina performed at synth wave festivals around Europe such as "Outland" and "Retro Future Festival".

Nina's debut album, Sleepwalking, was released on Aztec Records on March 16, 2018. The Electricity Club described the album's title track as "a wonderfully moonlit pop number with a Eurocentric sensibility that will also act as perfect to soundtrack a West Coast night drive". In November 2018, Nina performed six shows in the U.S. alongside Canadian synth pop band Parallels. Nina released her single "The Calm Before the Storm" as part of Adult Swim's "Fever Dreams" synth wave compilation.

In 2019, Nina Boldt appeared in the documentary film The Rise of the Synths, appearing alongside various other composers from the Synthwave scene, including filmmaker John Carpenter who also narrated the film which explored the origins and growth of the genre.

In 2020, Nina departed from her previous record label, Aztec Records and became an independent artist. Later that year, she collaborated with synthwave artist Essenger on a cover of the hit song "Nightcall" by French electronic artist Kavinsky. The single was released by Fixed Neon. Her follow-up EP ‘Control’ was released by Lakeshore Records and samples Cliff Martinez’ score from the feature film ‘Drive’.

Nina in 2021

2021 saw Nina release a series of new singles. The song "Berlin" was written in collaboration with Swedish synthpop band The Secret Chord and was named after Nina's home city. She later self-released "Carnival Night", which was co-written and produced by electronic rock artist Radio Wolf. The song received praise by music blogs; Wonderland magazine called it “…masterful…”. She then released another single in collaboration with Radio Wolf and Ricky Wilde called "Gold Heart". In December 2021, the Indie Horror feature film ‘There’s No Such Thing As Vampires’ was released, along with Nina's song "I'll Wait", which was a collaboration with the film's director Logan Thomas. The song was the soundtracks' lead single.

== Discography ==
=== Albums ===
- Sleepwalking (2018)
- Synthian (2020)
- Synthian (The Remixes) (2020)
- Scala Hearts (2023)
- Remixed Hearts (2024)

=== EPs ===
- We Are The Wild Ones (2013)
- My Mistake (2014)
- Beyond Memory (2016)
- Control (feat. LAU) [2020]

=== Singles ===
- "Take Me Away" (2012)
- "Heart Of Glass" (Blondie cover) [2015]
- "Beyond Memory" (2016)
- "One Of Us" (2017)
- ”The Calm Before The Storm” (2018)
- "Automatic Call" (2019)
- "Carnival Night" (2021)
- "Gold Heart" (2021)
- "I'll Wait" (2021)
- "Lust" (feat. Kid Moxie) [2023]
- "Electric Kiss" (feat. Kid Moxie) [2023]
