= Dance with the Dead =

American music duo

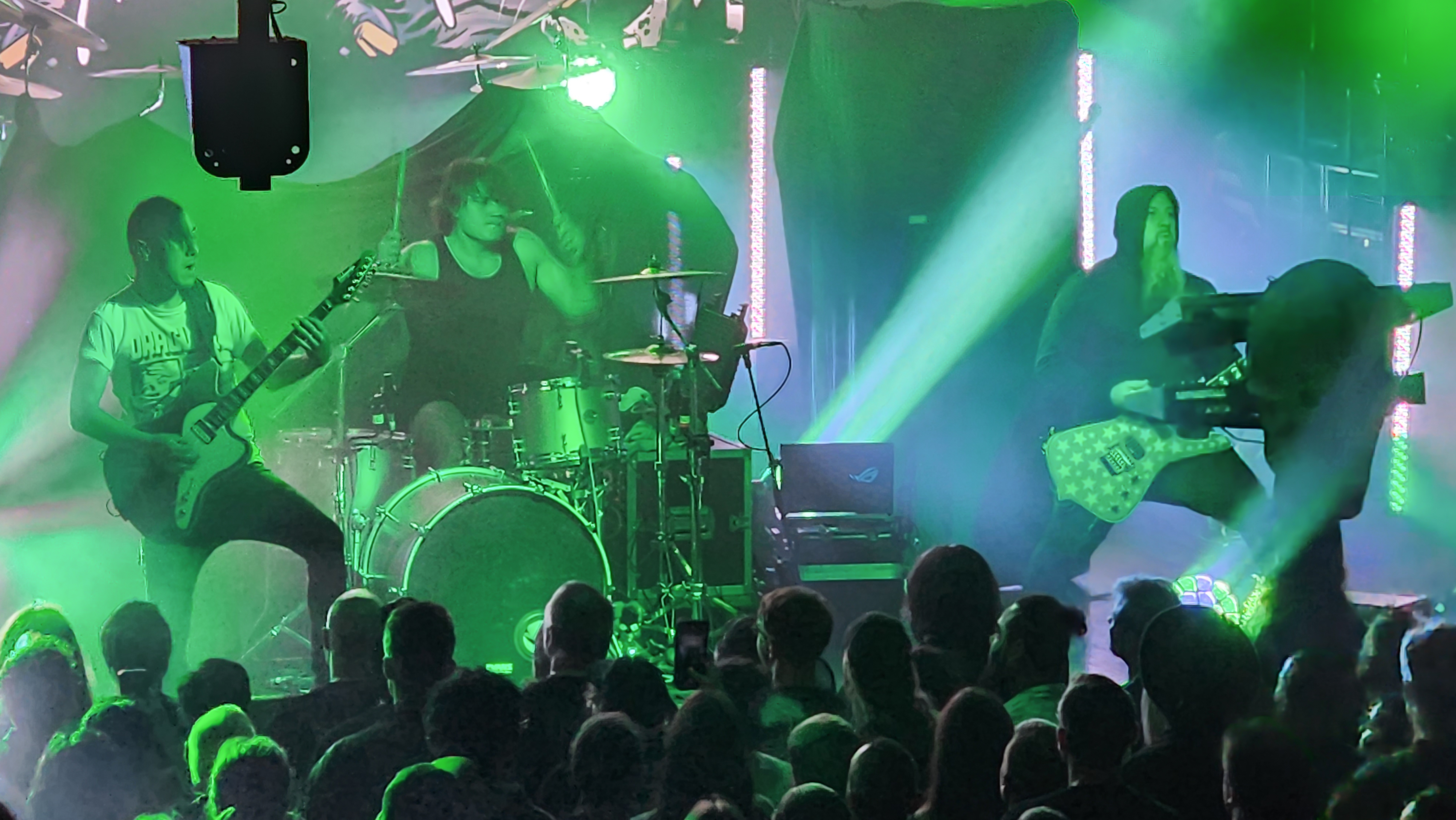
- Dance with the Dead performing in 2023 (from left: Tony Kim, tour drummer John Terry, and Justin Pointer)

Background information
- Origin: Irvine, California, U.S.
- Genres: Synthwave; darksynth; heavy metal; electronic rock
- Years active: 2013–present
- Members: Tony Kim; Justin Pointer
- Website: dancewiththedead.bandcamp.com

Dance with the Dead is an American music duo formed in California in 2013 by Tony Kim and Justin Pointer. Their music has been characterized as a blend of metal and synthwave, as well as "dark synthwave".

== History ==
Dance with the Dead was formed by two friends Tony Kim and Justin Pointer in 2013. The two are originally from Irvine, California, where they had been childhood friends. Over the years, they have shifted towards Pointer playing the synths while Kim plays lead guitar, although Pointer sometimes plays rhythm guitar. The band name "Dance with the Dead" originates from a working title for their first song and their fandom to the horror film genre.

The largest influences with the themes of Dance with the Dead have been horror movies, and their songs typically originate from jamming and passing around riffs and samples. They have mentioned musical and thematic influence by directors and composers such as Dario Argento, John Carpenter and Hans Zimmer.

The duo has emphasized energetic live performances with guitars and synths. They have been prolific on touring with the album releases, with their worldwide The Shape tour in 2017, Loved to Death tour in 2018, and Driven to Madness tour in 2022. During their live performances, they have shared venues with artists such as Carpenter Brut, DragonForce, the Devin Townsend Project, Magic Sword, and Daniel Deluxe. During tours, they have performed with the on-tour drummer John Terry.

While they had previously self-released their music via digital distribution, the album Loved to Death in 2018 was the first to be released with Neuropa Records.

Dance with the Dead are featured in the 2019 documentary film The Rise of the Synths, which explores the rising popularity of the synthwave music genre; they appear in the documentary and are also featured on its soundtrack with the song "Dead of Night".

Their record and merchandise art have had a distinct style noted in interviews, with most of the work done by graphic artists Ruben Martinez and Mark Kosobucki.

== Members ==
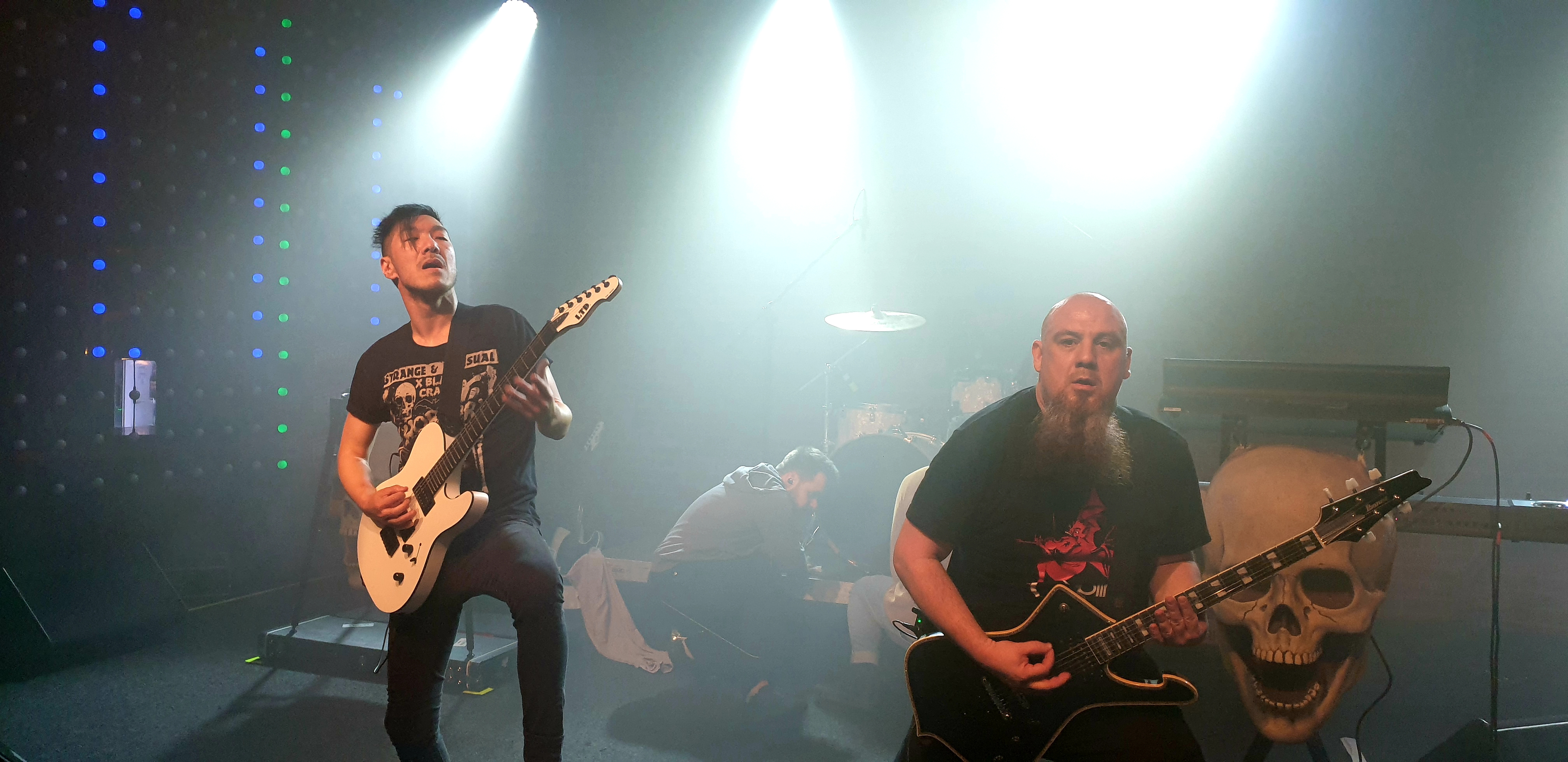
Dance with the Dead performing in 2020

- Tony Kim – lead guitar, programming
- Justin Pointer – keyboards, rhythm guitar, programming

Live members

- John Terry – drums

== Discography ==
Adapted from Bandcamp, Spotify, and YouTube.

=== Albums ===
- Out of Body (October 2013, self-released)
- Near Dark (August 2014, self-released)
- The Shape (February 2016, self-released)
- B-Sides: Vol. 1 (January 2017, self-released)
- Loved to Death (August 2018, self-released)
- Driven to Madness (January 2022, self-released)
- Out of Body (2023 Remastered Edition) (December 2023, self-released)
- Malombra (March 2026, self-released)

=== EPs ===
- Into the Abyss (March 2014, self-released)
- Send the Signal (December 2014, self-released)
- Blackout (January 2020, self-released)
- Dark Matter (October 2024)

=== Singles ===
- "The Poison (Reprise)" (September 2015)
- "Tension" (February 2019)
- "Cold as Hell" (feat. Shaun Phillips) (July 2024)
- "Neon Cross" (feat. Brandon Saller of Atreyu) (September 2024)
- "Psycho Disco" (November 2025)
- "Chaos Theory" (January 2026)
- "Black Clouds" (February 2026)

=== Remixes ===
- Assault on Precinct 13 (theme) (January 2013), by John Carpenter
- Master of Puppets (May 2015), by Metallica
- Doubt (July 2015), by Good Knives
- Gremlins (theme) (December 2015)
- Paint It Black (March 2016), by The Rolling Stones
- Around the World (July 2016), by Daft Punk
- We Will Rock You (September 2016), by Queen
- Neo-Tokyo (March 2017), by Scandroid
- Kickstart My Heart (September 2017), by Mötley Crüe
- Unspoken (June 2020), by The Dead Daisies
- Takes All Night (July 2020), by LeBrock
- "I Got 5 On It" (feat. Brandon Saller of Atreyu) (December 2020), by Luniz
- Holy Ground (January 2021), by The Dead Daisies

=== Music videos ===
- "Sledge" (December 2021)
- "Hex" (March 2022)
- "Firebird" (January 2023)
- "Kiss of the Creature" (July 2023)
- "Cold as Hell" (feat. Shaun Phillips) (July 2024)
- "Neon Cross" (feat. Brandon Saller of Atreyu) (September 2024)
- "Wolf Pack" (feat. Gunship) (October 2024)
