= Robert Parker (music producer) =

Swedish electronic musician

- Origin: Stockholm, Sweden
- Genres: Synthwave; electronic
- Occupation: Music producer
- Years active: 2009–present
- Labels: NRW Records; Lakeshore Records
- Website: robertparkerofficial.bandcamp.com

Robert Parker is a Swedish electronic musician from Stockholm, known for his synthwave works.

Making tracker music during the 1990s, he started making retro music in 2009 after buying a Korg Polysix analog synthesizer, and uses a variety of hardware synthesizers in his music like the Roland Juno 106 and the Moog Minimoog.

== Composing ==
His style takes elements from 1980s music and movies, as well as from French house and disco. In 2013 he released his debut album Drive. Sweat. Play followed by the EP Modern Moves on Future City Records. In 2015 he released the EP Cardinal and the album Money Talks. In 2016 he released the vinyl Crystal City on NewRetroWave Records collaborating with Maethelvin from the Valerie collective In 2017 he released the EP "Awakening" on Lazerdisc records, also appearing on the Lakeshore Records 2018 soundtrack release to the motion picture "Videoman".

Parker featured in the 2019 documentary film The Rise of the Synths which explored the origins and growth of the Synthwave genre, appearing alongside various other composers from the scene, including John Carpenter who also starred in and narrated the film. Parker also appeared on the film's soundtrack compilation "The Rise Of The Synths", also released on Lakeshore Records.

== Discography ==
=== Albums ===
| Year | Title | Label record | Ref. |
|---|---|---|---|
| 2014 | Drive. Sweat. PLay | Self released | |
| 2015 | Money Talks | Self released | |
| 2016 | Crystal City | NewRetroWave Records | |
| 2017 | Awakening | Lazerdiscs Records | |
| 2018 | End of the Night | NewRetroWave Records | |
| 2020 | Club 707 | Self released | |

=== EPs ===
| Year | Title | Label record | Ref. |
|---|---|---|---|
| 2014 | Modern Moves | Self released | |
| 2015 | Cardinal | Self released | |
| 2016 | Flight Comfort | Self released | |

=== Singles ===
| Year | Title | Label record | Ref. |
|---|---|---|---|
| 2018 | Modern Technology (featuring Waveshaper (musician) | Self released | |
| 2020 | A Light in the Dark | Self released | |
| 2020 | Aiming High (From Wave Break video game) | NewRetroWave Records | |
| 2021 | On the Road (From Road 96 video game) | Digixart | |
| 2024 | Fresh Feelings | Self released | |
| 2024 | The Weekend | Self released | |
| 2024 | Grand Bleu | Self released | |
| 2024 | Better Without you | Self released | |

=== Compilations ===
- The Singles 2013-2015 (2015, Self Released)
- The Rise of the Synths Companion Album (2017, Lakeshore Records)
