= Gunship (band) =

British synthwave band

- Origin: United Kingdom
- Genre: Synthwave
- Years active: 2014–present
- Label: Horsie in the Hedge
- Members: Alex Westaway; Dan Haigh; Alex Gingell
- Website: gunshipmusic.com

Gunship is a British synthwave band formed in 2014 by Dan Haigh and Alex Westaway; they were later joined by drummer Alex Gingell. The group has released three studio albums under their own label, Horsie in the Hedge.

Coinciding with the ongoing 1980s nostalgia phenomenon, Gunship would use 1980s films, soundtracks, cartoons and video games as their influences: their songs would often mimic synth soundtracks; their music videos and branding would contain retrofuturistic styles; and one of the band's logos was modelled after the Cannon Group, a defunct film studio.

== History ==
After Westaway and Haigh's other musical act, Fightstar, went on hiatus in 2010, the pair decided to focus on other musical ventures, including forming Gunship, eventually joined by Gingell. Their debut album, self-titled Gunship, was released in 2015 to positive reviews. Their follow up, Dark All Day, was released on 5 October 2018.

In 2019, Gunship appeared in the documentary film The Rise of the Synths, which explored the origins and growth of the Synthwave genre. Westaway, Haigh and Gingell appeared alongside various other composers from the scene, including John Carpenter, who also starred in and narrated the film.

In May 2021, tattoo artist and model Kat Von D collaborated with Haigh on her debut album, Love Made Me Do It.

On 10 July 2023 the band announced their third studio album titled Unicorn. The album was released on 29 September 2023. The artwork for this album was created by artist and director Maciej Kuciara.

As well as more traditional music videos, Gunship have experimented with a range of artistic approaches, including stop-motion, claymation, 8-bit, and AI-generated (among others). Often these videos include influences from, or elements of, video games and 80s culture.

== Equipment and gear ==
Gunship has a large collection of synthesizers, including the Roland Juno-106, Dave Smith Instruments Prophet 12 and Prophet 6, Moog Minimoog, Mother 32, and various Oberheim units.

== Additional album personnel and other collaborations ==
Gunship have tended to collaborate with the same artists on multiple occasions. Some of their most frequent and well-known collaborators are listed below:

Album Collaborator	2015	2018	2023	—N/a	—N/a
Album Collaborator	GUNSHIP	Dark All Day	Unicorn	Non-album Tracks	Remixes
Britta Phillips			Yes		
Charlie Simpson	Yes		Yes		
Carpenter Brut			Yes	Yes	Yes
Dance with the Dead				Yes	
Dave Lombardo			Yes	Yes	
Gavin Rossdale			Yes		
Health (band)			Yes		
Indiana		Yes			
John Carpenter	Yes		Yes		
Kat von D		Yes			Yes
Lazerhawk				Yes	
Lights			Yes		
Lionface					Yes
Lou Hayter	Yes				
Martin Grech	Yes				
Metrik				Yes	
Miami Nights 1984				Yes	Yes
Milkie Way			Yes		
Power Glove			Yes		Yes
Richard K. Morgan		Yes			
SIERRA VEINS (fka SIERRA)					Yes
Stella Le Page	Yes	Yes	Yes		
Thomas McRocklin				Yes	
Tim Cappello	Yes	Yes	Yes	Yes	Yes
Tyler Bates			Yes	Yes	
Una Healy		Yes			
Wil Wheaton		Yes			

=== Notes ===
- Lou Hayter is best known as a member of New Young Pony Club and Tomorrows World
- Richard K. Morgan is predominantly known as an author (Altered Carbon)

== Members ==
- Alex Westaway – vocals, multi-instruments
- Dan Haigh – multi-instruments
- Alex Gingell – multi-instruments

== Discography ==
Studio albums

List of studio albums, with year released and chart positions
Title	Year	Peak chart positions									
Title	Year	UK	UK Dance	UK Indie	FIN	GER	SCO	US	US Dance	US Heat	US Indie
Gunship	2015	—	30	40	—	—	—	—	—	—	—
Dark All Day	2018	34	1	6	—	—	19	184	4	1	8
Unicorn	2023	26	—	—	49	36	16	—	—	—	—

Non-album collaborations

- Collaborated with Metrik on the track "Electric Echo" (2016)
- Collaborated with Lazerhawk on the track "Feel the Rush Tonight" (2017)
- Collaborated with Corin Hardy on the track "Cthulhu" for the album Fangoria Presents: Hollydoom (Original Magazine Soundtrack) (2019)
- Collaborated with Tyler Bates and Dave Lombardo for "Berserker" on the Dark Nights: Death Metal Soundtrack(2021)
- Collaborated with Carpenter Brut for "The Widow Maker" on the album Leather Terror (2022)
- Collaborated with Miami Nights 1984 for "Only When It's Dark" on the album Sentimental (2022)
- Collaborated with Dance with the Dead for "Wolf Pack" on the EP Dark Matter (2024)
- Collaborated with Power Glove to cover the track "Shall Never Surrender" for the second series of Netflix's Devil May Cry (2025). Power Glove also remixed Gunship's "Gates of Disorder" for this project. Gunship had previously covered an Evanescence track for the first series
- Collaborated with Sonic Mayhem on the track "Core Breach (Built to Destroy)" (2026)
- Collaborated again with Tyler Bates and Dave Lombardo for "REVOLUTION.EXE" (2026). The three acts had previously collaborated together on "Beserker".

Additional releases

- Instrumental versions of their first three albums Gunship, Dark All Day and Unicorn have also been released
- Included the track "Vale of Shadows" on the album Rise of the Synths EP2 official companion album (2017)
- Released the single "The Video Game Champion" (2018), which contained numerous references to Doctor Disrespect
- Released the single "Art3mis & Parzival" (2018)
- Released the single Eleanor Rigby (2020), a cover of the popular track by The Beatles
- Released the single Send Me An Angel (2023), a cover of the track by Australian new wave/synth-pop band Real Life
- Released the single China in Your Hand (2024), a cover of the track by English pop group T'Pau. This also features frequent collaborator, Tim Cappello
- Released Tech Noir Timelines (2025) - a collection of both the previously released Gunship songs "Tech Noir" and "Tech Noir 2", along with a remix of each song by other artists
- Released the single Mad World (2025), sometimes stylised by the band as "MaD wOrLd" in promos, a cover of the track by English pop group Tears for Fears
- Released the single "Tell Me When the World Stops Ending" (2026), an original song created for the video game John Carpenter's Toxic Commando.

== Remixes ==
Remixes by Gunship

Gunship have remixed the following tracks for other artists:

- Lionface's "No Hope State" (2017). The original version of Lionface's track appeared on their Battle EP (2015)
- The track "Exorcism" from Kat Von D's album Love Made Me Do It (2021). They had previously worked with Kat Von D on "Black Blood Red Kiss"
- Gunship also did an unofficial remix of Bullet For My Valentine's "Gravity" (unreleased).
- SIERRA VEIN's "Stronger" from the album A Story of Anger (2023). This was released by SIERRA VEINS as part of a remixes EP, A Story of Anger - The Remixes (2024)
- Evanescence's "Afterlife" - a track originally produced for the Netflix series Devil May Cry (2025).

Remixes of Gunship songs by other artists

The following artists have remixed Gunship songs:

- Carpenter Brut remixed "Tech Noir". Gunship went on to collaborate with them on Carpenter Brut's track "Widow Maker", as well as "DooM Dance" (on Unicorn). This remix was included on the collection Tech Noir Timelines (2025)
- Makeup and Vanity Set remixed "Black Sun on the Horizon"
- Miami Nights 1984 remixed "Revel In Your Time". Gunship went on to collaborate with them on Miami Nights 1984's track "Only When It's Dark"
- April Towers remixed "The Mountain"
- In 2019, Gunship held a remix competition for their track "The Drone Racing League". Entries can still be listened to on their SoundCloud. This competition was eventually won by VHS Glitch
- Power Glove remixed "Dark All Day". Gunship went on to collaborate with Power Glove on "Ghost" as part of the album Unicorn
- Choir Noir released a choral version of "Black Blood Red Kiss".
- LOR (aka LORthecreator) remixed "Blood for the Blood God" from the album Unicorn in 2024 - this was released as an additional track on the single's release
- SIERRA VEINS remixed "Tech Noir 2" from the album Unicorn, which was released for the first time as part of the Tech Noir Timelines collection (2025). Gunship had previously remixed the SIERRA VEINS song "Stronger"
- Power Glove continued collaborating with Gunship by remixing "Gates of Disorder" for the second series of Netflix's Devil May Cry (2025)
- Makeup and Vanity Set, in collaboration with Tim Capello, remixed "Monster in Paradise" (2026).
