= Valerie Collective =

French musical cooperation

Valerie (Music Collective)
- Origin: Nantes, France
- Genres: Electronic, synthwave
- Years active: 2007–Present
- Members: College (musical project), Maethelvin, The Outrunners, Anoraak, Forgotten Illusions, Stephen Falken, Russ Chimes

The Valerie Collective was founded as a musical cooperation in Nantes, France, in 2007 by David Grellier and his friends and colleagues. Various acts in Valerie include The Outrunners, Minitel Rose, Anoraak, Maethelvin, all from Nantes as well as Russ Chimes from London and DVAS from Toronto, Ontario, Canada. Other artists included Keenhouse and Electric Youth. The hymn of the collective is "West Coast Valerie", a remix of the TV series Côte Ouest.

The Valerie Collective is described as "responsible for some of the very best original electronic music now coming out of France", was created as a way to foster musical talent, by providing opportunities for collaboration among artists, also connecting them through blogs and other internet channels. The collective is characterised by a "retro-futurist", "romantic blend of 1980s inspired electro" or synthwave.

Some of the works are released under the Valerie own record label, whereas others are released under various labels like FVTVR, Endless Summer Recordings, Believe Digital, Flexx, Free Danger. The label Endless Summer Recordings also prepared a compilation album in 2009 entitled Valerie and Friends joining a great number of artists in the project.
