= Ken Rangkuty =

German-Indonesian musician, composer and producer

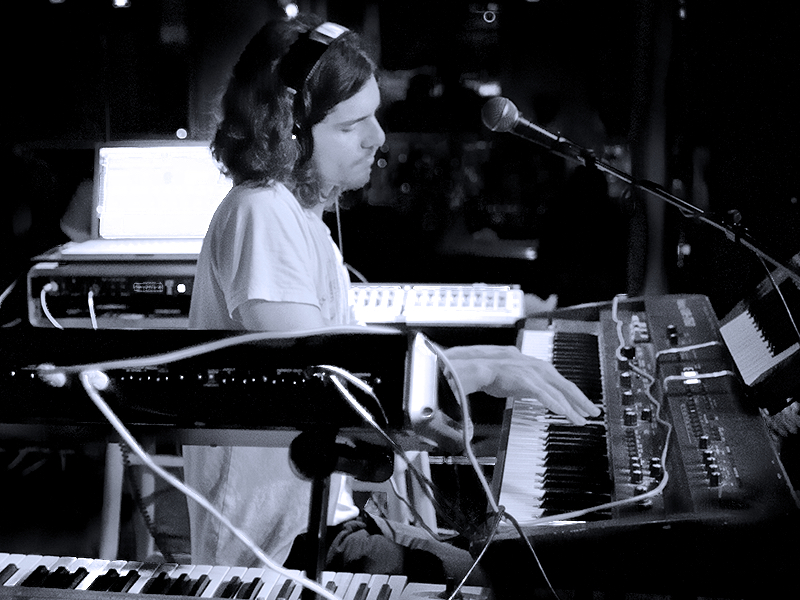

Background information
- Also known as: Keenhouse
- Born: Ken Alexander Rangkuty; January 6, 1981 (age 45); Giessen, Germany
- Genres: Electronic, synthwave, ambient, jazz
- Occupations: Composer, record producer
- Instruments: Piano, synthesizer, computer
- Years active: 2004–present
- Labels: Valerie Collective, Zetima, King Records, Sunlinxx Records, Binary Entertainment, Repressure Recordings, Emerald & Doreen
- Website: keenhouse.com

Ken Alexander Rangkuty (born January 6, 1981) is a German-Indonesian composer, multi-instrumentalist, and record producer. Known under the stage name Keenhouse, he produces electronic music covering a wide spectrum including synthwave ambient and house music.

== Group and production work ==
As a writer, arranger, and producer Ken Rangkuty has been active in a variety of musical styles that range from jazz and bossa nova to electronic and soundtrack music. He has worked with Japanese new-age producer Osamu Kitajima, rock producer John Ryan, disco producer Luxxury, and vocalist Maiya Sykes of Postmodern Jukebox.

Works with Osamu Kitajima feature him mainly as a pianist and arranger on the studio album Make Over by the bossa nova duo MAKE. The duo consisted of singer Mayumi Kaneyuki and Ken Rangkuty. The album was produced for Japanese label Up-Front Works/Zetima and released in 2007. Further works with Osamu Kitajima include the album Forever Tonight by jazz singer Amber Quinteiro featuring him as a pianist and arranger next to jazz musicians Brian Bromberg, Tim Emmons, and Clayton Cameron. The album was co-produced by Osamu Kitajima and John Ryan for King Records and released in 2007.

Ken Rangkuty co-produced the album The Last Seduction with disco producer Luxxury on which he is also featured as Keenhouse on the track "Terry Richardson". The album was released in 2012 by Los Angeles-based label Manimal Vinyl. Remix works include collaborations with Los Angeles-based radio personality Raul Campos for several remixes including Femi Kuti’s "Do You Know" and the track "To Die In L.A." by West Indian Girl.

As a composer and songwriter he has contributed soundtrack music for the movie Sideways (a Japanese remake of the same name) together with duo Make and the 2003 film Shade. He was commissioned to write compositions for Microsoft's launch campaigns for the game "The Vanishing Point Game" in 2007. The events featured original music synchronized with projections and a fireworks shows taking place at The Fountains of Bellagio in Las Vegas and Lake Union Seattle.

== As Keenhouse ==
Keenhouse's productions have been described as being rooted in a retro influenced style of electronic music while aiming to steer clear of trends and labels. In a piece for Impose Magazine he described his music to be deeply informed by retrospective imagery and futurism.

As Keenhouse he has been active since 2008 when his music was first featured by French Artist collective and label Valerie Collective. The debut album Civic Transit was released on Sunlinxx Records and re-released as a special edition on Japanese label Nurbs/Thistime Records. The album saw initial success with fans of Synthwave and retrowave as tracks such as "Deep In The Forest" and "Mecho Maniac" became widely spread on music blogs. Several album tracks have been featured in TV shows such as MTV's Styl’d and Real World series.

Shortly after the album release Keenhouse joined Los Angeles based collective Binary. The collective helped to establish a retro-influenced Synthwave sound dubbed "dreamwave". Eventually a connection between both the Valerie and Binary collectives was built that helped to spread the Synthwave genre on the US west coast. The term dreamwave was eventually picked up by Pitchfork and ABC News and helped to popularize a style of non-DJ centric electronic music production and live performances. Along with fellow artists Nightwaves, Fabian, and LexiconDon live-sets were mostly delivered using band settings and live vocals.

In 2012 Keenhouse released his second studio album Four Dreams in collaboration with Binary Records. The album was described as a complex mix between 1980s influenced synth pop, ambient music, and contemporary house music. The album was a released as a double vinyl LP and features 12 tracks using electronic music as a story telling device.

In 2015 Keenhouse released his third album A Future Past. Vice's online magazine Noisey described the album as his most organic to date mixing "futuristic impressionism" with surrealism while combining brass and string sections with synth programming. Buzzbands L.A. described the 15-track album as his most ambitious work mixing classical instrumentation with electronic productions. The album features singer Maiya Sykes on the track "Rise and Fall", artwork by Japanese multimedia artist Shinya Sato, and was released as a 24bit/96kHZ high resolution audio version. A remix version of the album was released by German future pop label Emerald & Doreen the same year.

As a remixer Keenhouse has remixed such artists as Japanese producer Shinichi Osawa, West Indian Girl, College, Fitz and the Tantrums, and Housse de Racket.

== Discography ==
=== As Keenhouse ===
Studio albums

- 2008: Civic Transit (Sunlinxx Records)
- 2009: Civic Transit Limited Edition (Nurbs/Thistime Records)
- 2012: Four Dreams (Binary Entertainment, Sunlinxx Records)
- 2015: A Future Past (Sunlinxx Records)
- 2015: A Future Past Remixed (Emerald & Doreen)

EPs

- 2011: The Summer Society (Sunlinxx Records)
- 2012: Better Days (Sunlinxx Records)
- 2013: Flex (Repressure Recordings)

Singles

- 2008: Mecho Maniac (Sunlinxx Records)
- 2008: Deep In The Forest (Valerie and Friends Compilation, Grand Blanc / Endless Summer Recordings)
- 2009: Ari-es (Binary Entertainment)
- 2011: Futurecop! feat. Keenhouse - The Only Way (Sleepover Party)
- 2012: Where I Belong ("Four Dreams", Sunlinxx Records)
- 2013: Keenhouse & go nogo - Take Off (Emerald & Doreen)
- 2013: Song To The Hawking Color (Emerald & Doreen)
- 2015: Argon Decibel ("A Future Past", Sunlinxx Records)
- 2015: Time ("A Future Past", Sunlinxx Records)

Remixes

- 2009: College - I Think About It (FVTVR label)
- 2009: Division Kent - L'heure Bleue (IF THEN Records)
- 2009: Fare Soldi - Survivor (Riotmaker)
- 2009: Fitz and the Tantrums - Breakin' the Changes of Love (RCRD LBL)
- 2009: Jogger - Nice Tights (Friends of Friends)
- 2009: Loose Shus - Taurus (Plant Music)
- 2009: Melnyk - The Competition (Gaymonkey)
- 2009: Muddyloop - Flight Night (Muddytrax Recordings)
- 2009: Muddyloop - 80s Love (Muddytrax Recordings)
- 2009: Muddyloop - Glamour Magazines (Muddytrax Recordings)
- 2009: Nightwaves - Fascination (Binary Entertainment)
- 2009: p e a c e FIRE - Baghdad Rainbow (Positive and Focused)
- 2010: Housse de Racket - Oh Yeah! (Schmooze)
- 2011: Alloapm - Gorilla Slighly (Sunlinxx Records)
- 2011: Christian Strobe - Midnight Call (Globelle)
- 2011: L’Equipe Du Son - Love Will Find a Way (Silhouette)
- 2011: Rhythm Droid - Sunset on Planet Tokyo (Sunlinxx Records)
- 2012: LexiconDon - December Sunset (Binary Records)
- 2012: Luxxury - The Last Seduction (Manimal)
- 2013: Shinichi Osawa - Zingaro (Rhythm Zone)
- 2013: Silenx - Stellar Kiss (Silhouette Music)
- 2013: p e a c e FIRE - Mystic Body (Sunlinxx Records)
- 2014: Estate + Liquid Pegasus - Tendency (Estate)

=== As Ken Rangkuty ===
Studio albums

- 2007: Make - Make Over (Zetima)
- 2007: Amber Quinteiro - Forever Tonight (King Records)
- 2008: The Sidestreet Players (Sunlinxx)
- 2012: Luxxury - The Last Seduction (Manimal)

Other work

- 2007: Vanish Point Game Commissioned Compositions
- 2003: Shade (soundtrack, DEJ Productions, RKO Pictures)
- 2009: Sideways (soundtrack, Cine Bazar, Fuji Television Network)
- 2020: "Shikisai" (soundtrack, Artscouncil Tokyo)
- 2022: "モザイク・ストリート" (soundtrack, Kaiju Films)

Remixes

- 2009: Femi Kuti - Do You Know (Raul Campos Fresh Produce Remix) (Downtown Records / Mercer Street Records)
- 2009: West Indian Girl - To Die In L.A. (Jesse Brooks, Ken Rangkuty & Raul Campos Remix) (Smash Hit Music Co)
