= Chromaphase =

Shanghai-based video artist

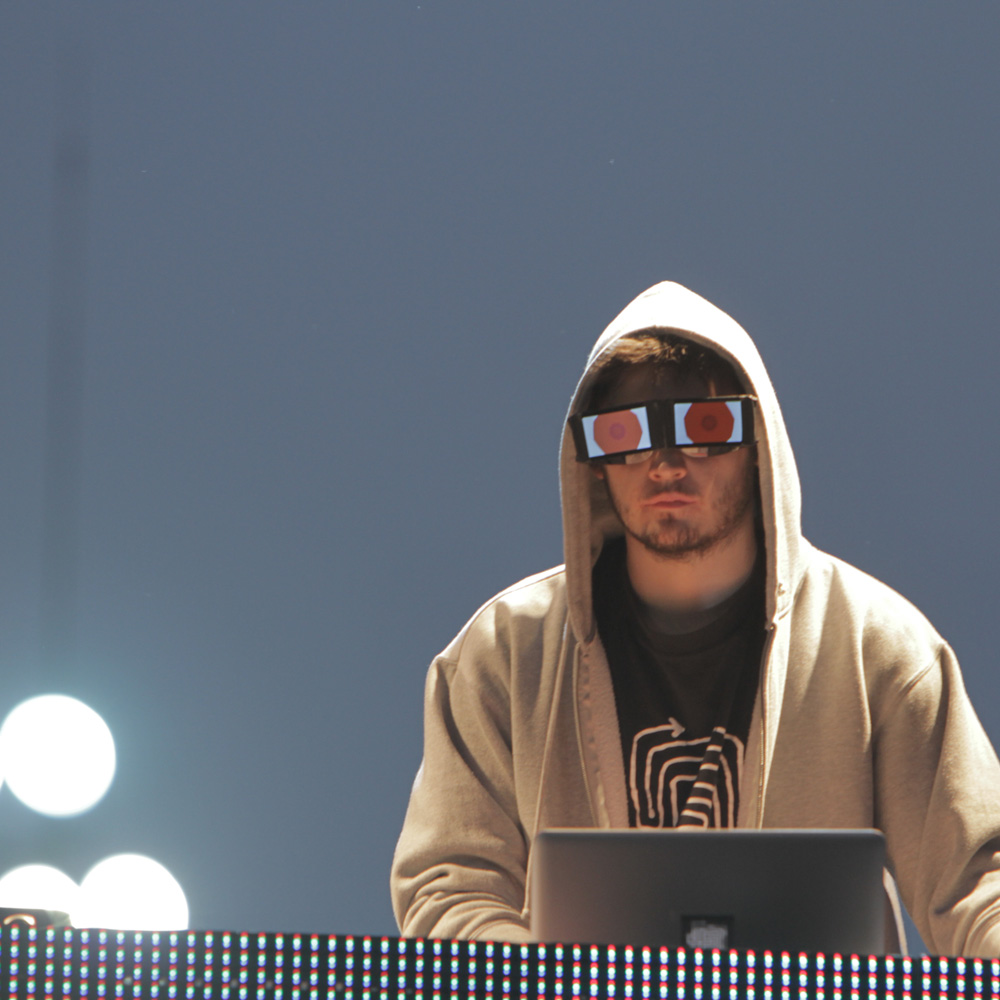
- Chromaphase during the MMAX Beijing Festival 2012

Background information
- Birth name: Matthieu Tondeur
- Born: 1985; France
- Genres: Electronic, Video artists
- Occupation(s): Video artists Designer
- Years active: 2007 – present
- Website: https://www.chromaphase.com

Chromaphase (born 1985 in Lens, France; birthname Matthieu Tondeur) is a Shanghai-based video artist. He is known for mixing his own cinematographic footages with graphic creations, mainly associated with Electronic live bands and DJs. Performing Digital Art and VJing mainly in Asia. He is considered as one of the most talented VJ in Shanghai. In 2014, he began to build permanent visual system for venues.

== History ==
Chromaphase began in 2007 with the Nu jazz Band Wipping Willow in France. During 2 years he performed in some of the most famous venues in Paris (La Fleche D'or, Le Trabendo, La Scene Bastille...) and Festivals (Nuit du Sud, Dailymotion Festival).

After arriving in Shanghai in 2009, Chromaphase began his career in VJ as an independent. He performed beside International DJs such The Twelves, kode9, R3, Achun, College and Chinese DJs such Ceezy, DJ Hbd, Sulumi, Howie Lee, and Lin Feng. All those cooperations made Chromaphase evolve in his style, finding new inspiration to match the style of each artist. He also explored live band performances (Jupiter, Mao Livehouse Shanghai 2012) and special events such the Jean-Paul Gaultier Fashion Show Party in Beijing and MMAX Beijing Festival.

== Cooperations ==
Besides being a solo performer, Chromaphase made cooperated live with several artists including kode9, The Twelves, College, Jupiter, Wipping Willow, r3, Achun, Sulumi, DMC Winners DJ HBD and DJ Monk, and Ceezy.
