= Hacride =

French progressive metal band

- Origin: Poitiers, France
- Genres: Progressive metal Technical death metal
- Years active: 2001–2019
- Labels: Listenable Records, Indie Recordings
- Past members: Benoist Danneville; Adrien Grousset; Florent Marcadet; Louis-Claude Roux; Samuel Bourreau; Olivier Laffond; Mike Roponus

Hacride were a French progressive metal band formed in 2001. Their sound evolved from technical death metal to progressive and avant-garde.

== Biography ==
Bass guitarist Benoist Danneville, guitarist Adrien Grousset, vocalist Samuel Bourreau, and drummer Olivier Laffond formed Hacride in Poitiers in 2001. In 2003, they released debut EP Cyanide Echoes, produced by Matthieu Metzger.

In 2005, the band signed with Listenable Records. Their song "The Daily Round" appeared on the label's Various Artists compilation Revolution Calling. Later that year, Listenable Records released the band's first full-length album, Deviant Current Signal. The band promoted this album in France and Switzerland through Deviant Tours I and II. They took part in the VS Fest II at Loco in Paris on May 28, 2006. In mid-2007, vocalist Yann Ligner filled in on vocals while Bourreau recovered from illness.

In 2007, Hacride recorded second album Amoeba, with producer Franck Hueso, released through Listenable Records. Third full-length album Lazarus followed on April 20, 2009. In late 2009, drummer Mike Roponus began filling in for Laffond when the latter's wife became pregnant. In February 2010, Laffond announced that he was quitting the music industry to focus on his family. Roponus became the band's official drummer.

In 2012, Bourreau left and was replaced with Louis-Claude Roux, formerly of depressive black metal band Havarax. Drummer Florent Marcadet replaced Roponus. The band signed to Indie Recordings.

On April 19, 2013, Hacride released fourth album Back to Where You've Never Been on Indie Recordings. Franck Hueso and Marc Casanova co-produced it.

In October 2013, the band toured the UK with support from Ten Cent Toy.

On July 27, 2017, Hacride independently released the EP Chapter I: Inconsolabilis as a digital-only release via Bandcamp.

== Band members ==
Final lineup

- Benoist Danneville − bass (2001–2019)
- Adrien Grousset − guitar (2001–2019)
- Florent Marcadet − drums (2012–2019)
- Louis-Claude Roux − vocals (2012–2019)

Former members

- Samuel Bourreau − vocals (2001-2012)
- Olivier Laffond − drums (2001–2010)
- Yann Ligner − vocals (2007)
- Mike Roponus − drums (2010–2012)

== Discography ==
Studio albums

- Deviant Current Signal (2005, Listenable Records / CD-Maximum)
- Amoeba (2007, Listenable Records)
- Lazarus (2009, Listenable Records)
- Back to Where You've Never Been (2013, Indie Recordings)

EPs

- Cyanide Echoes (2003, self-released)
- Chapter I: Inconsolabilis (2017, self-released)
