= The Rise of the Synths =

2019 documentary film by Iván Castell

- Film poster
- Directed by: Iván Castell
- Written by: Iván Castell
- Produced by: Ana Castañosa Bielsa; Javier Moreno; Rebeca Villar Rodríguez; Iván Castell
- Narrated by: John Carpenter
- Cinematography: Beltrán García; Adrián Barcelona
- Edited by: Iván Castell
- Music by: OGRE
- Production companies: Castell & Moreno Films; 9AM Media Lab
- Release dates: 1 November 2019 (In-Edit Film Festival); 13 December 2019 (Spain)
- Running time: 80 minutes
- Countries: Spain; United States
- Languages: English; French; Spanish

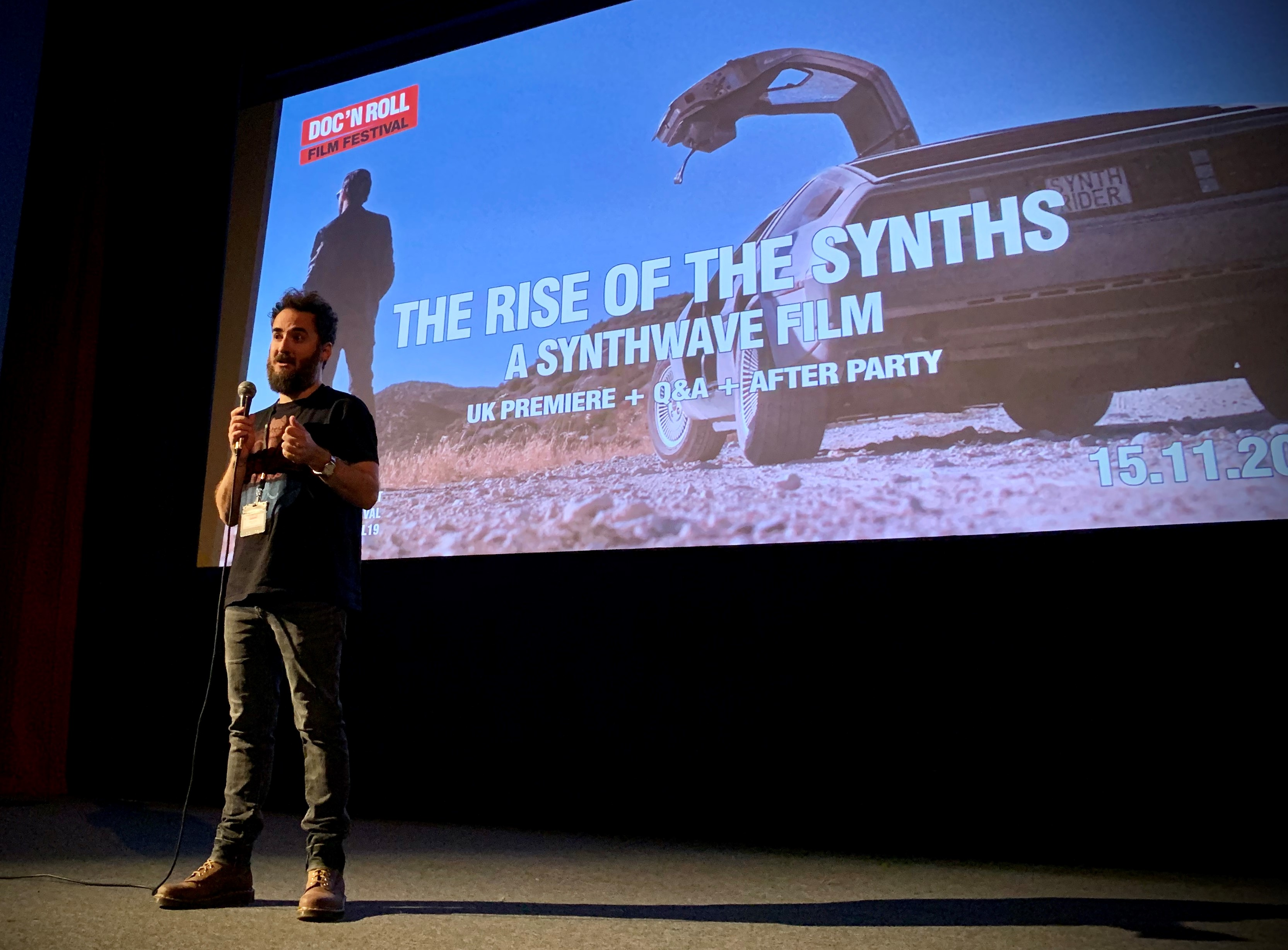
Director Ivan Castell introducing The Rise of the Synths at the UK premiere

The Rise of the Synths (Spanish: La rebelión de los sintes) is a 2019 documentary film written and directed by Iván Castell and narrated by filmmaker and composer John Carpenter. The film explores the origins and growth of the electronic music genre known as synthwave, charting its rise in popularity from the underground online music scene to its recent mainstream exposure, following use in retro-themed soundtracks, notably the 2011 film Drive and, more recently, the television series Stranger Things.

It is the first feature documentary exploring this underground subculture.

== Production ==
The Rise of the Synths initially began as a crowdfunding campaign on Kickstarter, in April 2016. That campaign failed and was relaunched in October 2016 on Indiegogo, this time reaching its goal. Over the next year, the film was part of the Documentary Campus Masterschool, also participating in the Sheffield Doc/Fest MeetMarket.

The Rise of the Synths had its world premiere at the In-Edit Festival in Barcelona on 1 November 2019, with its international premiere on 15 November in London at the Doc'n Roll Festival. It has also been screened at the International Film Festival Rotterdam (Netherlands), Buenos Aires International Festival of Independent Cinema (Argentina), F.A.M.E. Festival Paris (France), and Melbourne Documentary Film Festival (Australia).

== Cast ==
With John Carpenter narrating, the film includes interviews with both established and upcoming synthwave artists, exploring their sources of inspiration, which range from early electronic pioneers such as Giorgio Moroder, Vangelis, and Tangerine Dream, to a collective love of 1980s films and video games.

Artists featured in the film include:

- Carpenter Brut
- Gunship
- Perturbator
- Electric Youth
- The Midnight
- Nina
- Power Glove
- Dance with the Dead
- Robert Parker
- Waveshaper
- OGRE
- Miami Nights 1984
- Valerie Collective (College, Maethelvin)
- Lazerhawk
- 80's Stallone
- John Bergin
- MPM Soundtracks
- Night Crawler
- Scandroid
- Mecha Maiko
- Gost

For many of them, it was their first time on camera. Some of these musicians, such as Power Glove, Carpenter Brut, Gost, Lazerhawk, Miami Nights 1984, 80s Stallone, and MPM Soundtracks, had never agreed to be recorded on camera and show their faces before. A few of them, such as Carpenter Brut, MPM Soundtracks, Gost, and Power Glove, insisted on keeping their faces or voices concealed or masked.

== Synth Rider ==
The film arch-narrative is driven by a fictional character, the Synth Rider (also referred to as Synthrider, without spaces), created by Spanish director Iván Castell in 2015 and played by Spanish actor Rubén Martinez. He is a lonely driver who time-travels in a DeLorean from the 1980s, with the mission of preserving the legacy of its masters: the electronic pioneers Giorgio Moroder, John Carpenter, Vangelis, and Tangerine Dream, among others.

The character first appeared on the crowdfunding campaign video that started in April 2016 on Kickstarter. That campaign failed, but the character re-appeared in a second campaign video (as the leader of the #LaResistance movement), on Indiegogo.

He is the side-protagonist in the feature film, time-travelling—from one influential decade to the previous one—in a DeLorean, guided by the voice of the narrator. As journalist Ben Beaumont-Thomas described in the Guardian review of the film: "Carpenter is employed as a sensei-like narrator, recording his observations on to a cassette tape to be taken back in time by a Gosling-type pretty-boy street punk driving a DeLorean".

The director created the Synthrider "as an homage of the Mad Max's Night Rider character and Ryan Gosling in Drive" and as a "metaphor of the time travel backward that most people experience when they discover this subculture. He is the artists, fans, music, films, all together in one person — with a kickass They Live neck tattoo". French journalist Nicolas Plomee points out another reference to the 1980s classic film Back to the Future: "The reference to Back to the Future (1985) from Robert Zemeckis is accentuated by those scenes, half-way into Drive (2010) from Nicolas Winding Refn, (...) and Mad Max (1979) from George Miller, where the character drives a DeLorean."

Being a re-adaptation of a longtime archetype used in the retro scene—the lone night rider driving an 80s sports car—the character was well received by synthwave fans, and the term '"Synthrider" was adopted organically by the community as a way of referring to themselves as synthwave fans, and it began to appear as a hashtag on Twitter and Instagram profiles in 2016.

Director Iván Castell declared that the character wasn't supposed to be in the final film, he was originally created for a mood trailer as a way of catching the attention of film producers. The idea was then reused in the first crowdfunding campaign and worked so well, that he decided to integrate him in the film.

== Reception ==
Reviewing the film, Cinemania wrote, "It will delight music lovers and fans of synthesizers". Rob Dyson of ForeverSynth stated that director and writer Ivan Castell "hits all the right notes in terms of why and how the music and iconic imagery appeals – even to those who weren't born in the 70s or 80s." Inaki Ortiz Gasoc at El Contraplano wrote, "The aesthetic is careful and prevents this from being a classic boring documentary of talking heads" with "some fantastic film performances following the canons of the musical movement with its DeLorean". Jorge Loser at Espinof commented that "Carpenter's voice serves as a connection between blocks with creative tips and reflections on his career and his role in this whole new movement." The view from The Guardian's Bill Beaumont-Thomas was more mixed, with him praising the film's "admirable production values", particularly the "impressively produced interstitial [fictional] segments", but also mentioning that the documentary was "stylish but shallow" and "trades deep analysis for platitudes and boring asides".

== Soundtrack ==
The film's soundtrack is composed by OGRE. In support of the film, Lakeshore Records also released an official companion album in 2017, which received positive reviews and featured exclusive music from various synthwave artists.

Track listing
No.	Title	Music	Length
1.	"Deckard Returns"	Chrome Canyon	3:32
2.	"The Vale of Shadows"	Gunship	6:02
3.	"Fatal Affair"	Power Glove	3:26
4.	"Makita"	Geno Lenardo	2:37
5.	"Idle Withdrawal"	Com Truise	4:20
6.	"Lost in a Love"	Daniel Davies	3:44
7.	"Silver Shadow"	Robert Parker	5:34
8.	"A Mission to Remember"	Waveshaper	5:10
9.	"Black Rain"	Code Elektro	4:44
10.	"The Osbourne Effect"	German Engineering	2:24
11.	"Triage"	Giorgio Moroder & Raney Shockne	2:24
12.	"Night Stalker"	Carpenter Brut	3:41
13.	"Crash & Burn"	John Bergin	2:47
14.	"Dead of Night"	Dance with the Dead	4:06
15.	"A Hero's Journey"	Lazerhawk	6:33
16.	"Rebar (Prologue)"	OGRE	3:36
17.	"Fleshman"	John Bergin	4:49
18.	"Stargate"	Mega Drive	5:09
19.	"Appearance of the Mysterious Traveller"	Voyag3r	7:32

The film also features the music of Power Glove, Maethelvin, 80s Stallone, NINA, Robert Parker, Waveshaper, Nightcrawler, Cougar Synth, Electric Youth, Miami Nights 1984, Dance with the Dead, MPM Soundtracks, Lazerhawk, Bluezz Vylez, College, GOST, Carpenter Brut, Mecha Maiko, Mega Drive, Scandroid, Sebastian Gampl, D/A/D, Gunship, and IamManolis.

== See also ==
- 1980s in music
- 1980s in film
- Nostalgia
- Vaporwave
- Retro style
