= Aztec Records =

British record label

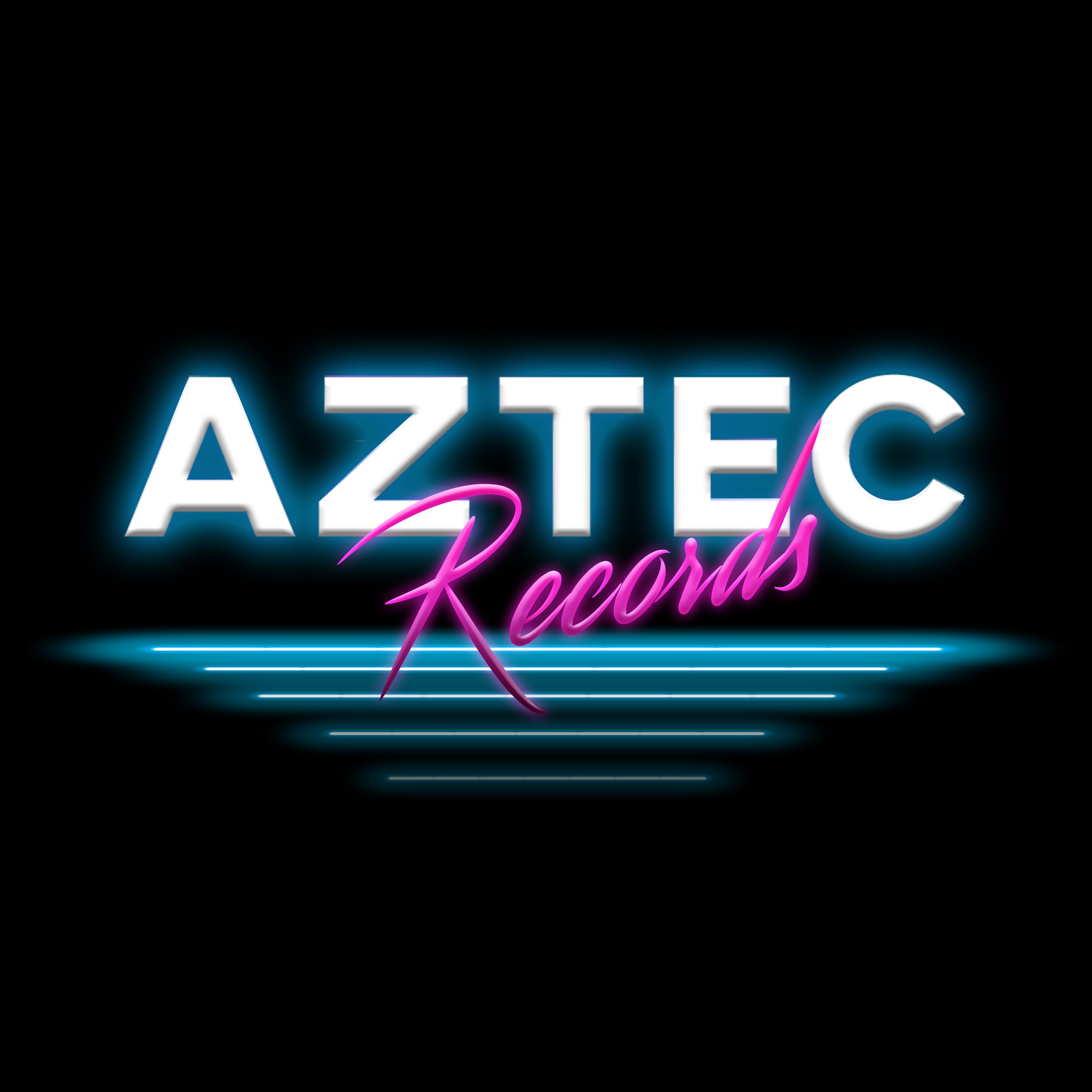
- Founded: 2010
- Founder: Laura Fares & Ariel Amejeiras
- Genre: Electronic, Electropop, Synthpop, Synthwave, Retrowave, Latin Music
- Country of origin: United Kingdom
- Location: London, England
- Official website: aztecrecords.com

Aztec Records is an independent British record label. It specialises in electronic and pop music, in the subgenres of synthpop, synthwave and retrowave, following the music and pop culture of the '80s. It was founded in 2010 by Laura Fares and Ariel Amejeiras.

== Label Development ==
The record company has developed and released acts such as: Bright Light Bright Light, NINA, LAU, Zenith Volt, Sunglasses Kid, Owlle, Gryff, Thought Beings, Primo the Alien, Oblique, Eutropic, Power Rob, Surrender, Wyve, Mickey Cupid, Traverse Town, Maighread and many others.

Bright Light Bright Light is Welsh composer/producer and DJ Rod Thomas. His album "Make Me Believe In Hope", was recorded during two years with different collaborators: Andy Chatterley (Kylie / Nerina Pallot), Boom Bip (Neon Neon) and The Invisible Men (Jessie J).

Laura Fares discovered and developed NINA in 2010, a German singer-songwriter based in Berlin, with whom she formed a band until 2019. Aztec Records released NINA's first single "Take Me Away", a pop dance song, in 2011. The label has also produced and released NINA's first two albums ‘Sleepwalking’ (2018) and ‘Synthian’ (2020), with producers like Richard X, Oscillian, Ricky Wilde and Sunglasses Kid.

In 2012, Aztec Records teamed up with EQ Music Blog to organize the first Poptronik Festival in Sitges, Spain, featuring Andy Bell of Erasure, Monarchy, Simon Curtis, Markus Riva, superstar producer Fernando Garibay and other international artists, and a compilation was released for that event.

The label has more than 25 international artists on their roster and releases new music weekly. The label also releases different compilations regularly, like "Pure Synthwave" which was curated by NINA herself, "Pure Darkwave", "Pure Retrowave", "Pure Synthpop" and more recently "Pure Latin Synth", that inspired Ariel and Laura to start a Latin American branch, based in Argentina.

In 2020 Aztec Records launched their Spanish speaking sub-label called Aztec Latin, which specialises in pop and electronic music purely in Spanish. Artists include: Ignacia, Jaz Oil, Locker, Verona, Caseti, Mandy Barrón, Kush Mama, The Broken Flowers Project and others.

Aztec Music Publishing is the publishing branch of Aztec Records. It began in 2014 with the idea of expanding its catalog and managing it properly to place it in films, television, games and commercials. Placements include brands such as: Adidas, Hugo Boss, Mercedes Benz, Uniqlo, Victoria's Secret and some others.

== Artists ==
- LAU
- NINA
- Bright Light Bright Light
- Sunglasses Kid
- Syst3m Glitch
- Gryff
- Zenith Volt
- Bunny X
- MORPHOICE
- Fulvio Colasanto
- Eutropic
- Adam Siana
- EhRah
- Power Rob
- Friday Night Firefight
- Popcorn Kid
- Pleasure
- Space Tourist
- Oblique
- Surrender
- Mike Haunted
- Primo The Alien
- XES
- WYVE
- Traverse Town
- SJ Bravo
- Mickey Cupid
- Coastal
- WET SUNSET
- Cymatica
- Sight Telma Club
- Thought Beings
- Woman E
- Arcade Ocean

== Discography ==
Catalogue number	Artist	Title
AZT0001	The Feathered Snake EP	Tecnoctitlan
AZT0002	Keep Calm & Carry On	Tecnoctitlan
AZT0003	In The Beginning	Maighréad
AZT0004	Closer	TNTT
AZT0005	Cool 'n The Gang	Cereal Killers
AZT0006	Lady Joker	Lady Joker
AZT0007	Bad Boyfriend	Johnny Lazer
AZT0008	We Don't Miss A Beat	Van Go Lion
AZT0009	Hands Down	Angelo
AZT0010	"More Than Human"	TNTT
AZT0011	Soul Electric	RAFF
AZT0012	Take Me Away	NINA
AZT0013	"Human Sacrifice"	TNTT
AZT0015	Desire	Woman E
AZT0016	This Beat Is POPTRONIK – Volume One	Various Artist
AZT0017	Hit & Run	Woman E
AZT0018	Hit & Run (The Remixes)	Woman E
AZT0019	Mickey Cupid	Mickey Cupid
AZT0020	We Are The Wild Ones	NINA
AZT0021	My Mistake	NINA
AZT0023	Parade	Mickey Cupid
AZT0024	"Heart Of Glass"	NINA
AZT0025	"Summer"	Mickey Cupid
AZT0026	"Waterline"	SJBRAVO
AZT0027	Beyond Memory	NINA
AZT0028	"Feel You"	Mickey Cupid
AZT0029	We Never Dream	SJBRAVO
AZT0030	Graduation	Sunglasses Kid
AZT0031	"Night Swim"	Sunglasses Kid
AZT0032	"Corruptin' Mind"	Sunglasses Kid
AZT0033	Sleepwalking (Album)	NINA
AZT0034	"Killer"	Traverse Town
AZT0035	Killer (EP)	Traverse Town
AZT0036	Sleepwalking (Deluxe Edition)	NINA
AZT0038	Pure Synthwave Vol. 1	Various Artist
AZT0039	"Sunset On The Bay"	WYVE
AZT0040	"The Calm Before The Storm"	NINA
AZT0042	Pure Retrowave Vol. 1	Various Artists
AZT0043	Pure Synthwave Vol. 2	Various Artists
AZT0044	Pure Retrowave Vol. 2	Various Artists
AZT0045	Pure Darkwave Vol. 1	Various Artists
AZT0046	Automatic Call (Single EP)	NINA
AZT0047	Pure Synthpop Vol. 1	Various Artist
AZT0048	Time Zones (EP)	Friday Night Firefight
AZT0049	Surrender	Surrender
AZT0051	Fictiopolis	WYVE
AZT0052	Pure Latin Synth, Vol. 1	Various Artist
AZT0053	Where No One Goes (EP)	Friday Night Firefight
AZT0054	"Forbidden Love"	XES
AZT0055	Buenos Aires Outrun, Vol. 1	Various Artist
AZT0056	"Heartbeat"	Zenith Volt
AZT0057	"World Goes Round"	Friday Night Firefight
AZT0058	"Challenger"	Zenith Volt
AZT0059	Turbo Drive, Vol. 1	Various Artists
AZT0060	"Hold On"	Zenith Volt
AZT0061	"Galaxy	Zenith Volt
AZT0062	"Super-computer"	Zenith Volt
AZT0063	Synthian	NINA
AZT0064	Disappear (The Remixes)	Surrender
AZT0065	Synth Songs of Hope, Vol. 1	Various Artists
AZT0066	"Human Error"	Fulvio Colasanto
AZT0067	"Black Heart"	Oblique
AZT0068	"Psycho Beat"	Fulvio Colasanto
AZT0069	"Stunning"	LAU
AZT0070	"True"	LAU
AZT0071	"Little Light"	Mike Haunted feat. Chris KD
AZT0072	"Radical Dreamers"	Fulvio Colasanto feat. XES
AZT0073	"We Had Magic"	LAU
AZT0073	The Mothership	Space Tourist
AZT0075	Pleasure EP	Pleasure
AZT0076	"Recognise"	LAU
AZT0077	Miami Cyber Nights Vol. 1	Various Artists
AZT0078	Synthian (The Remixes)	NINA feat. LAU
AZT0079	DARK: Awake / Ivory Crow	Eutropic
AZT0080	AGE: Distant World / Silicon God	Eutropic
AZT0081	DAY: Pieces / Run	Eutropic
AZT0082	DREAM: Down By Law / Starry Sky	Eutropic
AZT0083	"Silhouettes"	Friday Night Firefight
AZT0084	"Fixing Me With Love"	Sunglasses Kid & Primo The Alien
AZT0085	"Chill"	Sunglasses Kid & Jay Diggs
AZT0086	Sophomore	Sunglasses Kid
AZT0087	A Deep Blue Swimming Pool	Wet Sunset
AZT0088	"NYC Sunrise"	Bunny X & Marvel83'
AZT0089	Pure Synthwave, Vol. 3	Various
AZT0090	Calypso Drip FM	Gryff
AZT0091	Tranquility Base (Deluxe Edition)	The Secret Chord
AZT0092	"Free Forever"	Popcorn Kid ft. LAU
AZT0093	Runaway	Power Rob
AZT0094	"In The Night"	Adam Siana
AZT0095	"Telekinesis"	Oblique
AZT0096	"The House"	Fulvio Colasanto feat. Christina Sirva & Mike Haunted
AZT0097	Superstars	Fulvio Colasanto feat. Eutropic
AZT0098	Neon Beach	Thought Beings
AZT0099	"Hours"	Cymatica
AZT0104	New Religion	Gryff
AZT0101	"Back To Christmas"	Oblique
AZT0102	"Caskets"	Cymatica
AZT0100	DARK AGE DAY DREAM	Eutropic
AZT0105	Somewhere in Between EP	Cymatica
AZT0110	"Wild Love"	Friday Night Firefight
AZT0117	"Alone At Xmas"	Heartracer
AZT0107	"Apricale (Stal Remix)"	Wet Sunset
AZT0109	The Beginning	NINA
AZT0106	"Thunder"	Ends 84 feat. Power Rob
AZT0111	"The Cards"	LAU
