= Nicolas Makelberge =

Nicolas Makelberge is a Swedish artist and co-founder of Médecine interior design studio in Prague.

The trajectory of Nicolas' artistic path was shaped by attending art school at an early age in Lund, Sweden (1996) as well as earning higher degrees in design in Rhode Island in the US (2005) and Porto, Portugal (2012).

The distinctiveness of his approach has earned him international recognition, with his art being featured in publications including ELLE Decor, Forbes and Harpers Bazaar as well as collaborations with high-end design companies around the world including Minotti and Audo.

Nicolas' music has been nominated for various music awards in his native Sweden including the national radio awards for the 2006 album "Dying in Africa", a collaboration with Johan Tuvesson from Swedish pop duo Karl x Johan.

== Discography ==
- 2018 – Confessions (EP, DEO Records)
- 2013 – Born From The Sun (EP, Emotion)
- 2010 – The Unforgettable Planet (Album, Emotion)
- 2006 – Dying in Africa (Album, Rico)
- 2006 – "Dying in Africa" (Single, Rico)
- 2005 – South America (EP, Bedroom)

== Remixes / Collabs ==
- 2021 – Nicolas Makelberge & Kalle J - Phyllis
- 2020 – Kalle J - Korn av guld (Nicolas Makelberge Remix)
- 2015 – Nina K - Air (Believe in Asians)
- 2014 – Fimbria - Forgiveness (Nicolas Makelberge Remix)
- 2012 – Picture - Everything Time (Nicolas Makelberge Remix)
- 2011 – Lake Heartbeat - Watch The World Go By (Nicolas Makelberge Remix)
- 2010 – Nottee - Don't Waste Your Light On Me (Nicolas Makelberge Remix)
- 2009 – Loredana - Rain Rain (Nicolas Makelberge Remix)
- 2007 – Friday Bridge - It Girl (Nicolas Makelberge Remix)

== Media / Awards ==
In 2019 Swedish music magazine Synth.nu referred to the Confessions EP as "instrumental, electronic music created with hardware and a lot of heart".

In 2014, The Guardian listed the single "Dying in Africa" (a collaboration with Johan Tuvesson form Karl x Johan) as one of 10 best dance tracks out of Scandinavia.

In 2013 NY lifestyle magazine Fader referred to Nicolas Makelberge as "Probably the planet's most underrated producer".

In 2011, the follow-up record to Dying in Africa, The Unforgettable Planet, mostly an instrumental album was once again nominated at independent music makers awards, Manifestgalan in Sweden.

2011 Le Monde mentions Nicolas Makelberge as ”An obsession and well worth a listen”

In 2006, Makelberge's album Dying in Africa was nominated for the P3 Guld at Swedish national radio awards and Manifestgalan in the category of pop music.

Sonic Magazine listed Dying in Africa as one of the best of 2006.

Makelberge previously released records on Rico and Emotion.
