= Sexy Sushi =

French electroclash band

Sexy sushi
- Origin: Nantes, France
- Genres: Electroclash; electropunk
- Years active: 2004–2014
- Labels: Wonderground; Scandale Records; L'autre distribution
- Members: Rebeka Warrior; Mitch Silver
- Website: sexysushi.free.fr

Sexy Sushi is a French electroclash band formed in Nantes in 2004, consisting of Rebeka Warrior and Mitch Silver.

Their first albums were released as burned CD-R by alternative distributors like Wonderground. An EP and an album were then released in 2009 by Scandale Records. Their most recent album, Vous n'allez pas repartir les mains vides, was released in 2013.

== Members ==
Rebeka Warrior (real name Julia Lanoë) born in 1978, is the vocalist and musician in both Sexy Sushi and Mansfield.TYA bands. Mitch Silver (real name David Grellier) born in 1979, is also the founder of the musical projects College and Valerie.

== Discography ==
- 2004: J'en veux j'en veux … des coups de poing dans les yeux ! (CDR, Merdier Record / WonDerGround Distribution)
- 2005: Défonce ton ampli (CDR, Merdier Records / Wonderground)
- 2005: Caca (CDR, Merdier Records / Wonderground)
- 2006: Ça m’aurait fait chier d’exploser (CDR, Merdier Records / Wonderground)
- 2008: Marre Marre Marre (Believe)
- 2009: EP Des jambes (SV03, Scandale Records)
- 2009: Tu l'as bien mérité ! (SC002, Scandale Records)
- 2009: Girlfriend 09 (feat. Näd Mika)
- 2010: Château France
- 2010: Cyril (L'autre distribution)
- 2011: Mauvaise foi
- 2011: Flamme
- 2013: Vous n'allez pas repartir les mains vides ?
- 2014: Vous en reprendrez bien une part ?
