= Maethelvin =

French Electronic / Synthwave musician

Maethelvin (a.k.a. Nicolas Bataille) is an Electronic / Synthwave musician from Nantes, France, and member of the Valerie Collective. With inspiration from artists as Jan Hammer and Giorgio Moroder, Maethelvin has made electronic music since 2007 and plays live together with artists as College and Forgotten Illusions. Releasing singles since 2007 he released his debut album CS005 2015.

== Discography ==
=== Singles ===
- The Last Escape / Cruising (2009, with Stephen Falken)
- As We Were (2013, Valerie Records)
- Love Theme (2016, with Robert Parker

=== Albums ===
- CS005 (2015, Valerie Records)
