= Mansfield.TYA =

- Origin: Nantes
- Genres: Electro; post-rock; folk music; baroque music
- Years active: 2002-2022
- Past members: Julia Lanoë; Carla Pallone

Mansfield.TYA is a French post-rock duo formed in 2002, composed of Julia Lanoë and Carla Pallone.

== History ==
Mansfield.TYA was founded in 2002 in Nantes by Sexy Sushi singer Julia Lanoë (alias Rebeka Warrior) and baroque violinist Carla Pallone. The name of the band is a reference to June Miller (alias June Mansfield), the second wife of novelist Henry Miller.

They release a first EP in 2004, May, and their first album June in 2007. Their second album Seules au bout de 23 secondes, released in 2009, is described as "an anomaly" (une anomalie) between folk and post-rock.

After Nyx (2011), described as a "nocturnal post-rock baroque opera", they released Corpo Inferno in 2015, featuring American singer Shannon Wright on the track "Loup noir". Monument ordinaire (2021), an album featuring Odezenne and Bérurier Noir singer François Guillemot, is their last album before their split in 2022.

== Discography ==
- June (2007)
- Seules au bout de 23 secondes (2009)
- Nyx (2011)
- Corpo Inferno (2015)
- Monument ordinaire (2021)
