= Can of Worms (band) =

French band

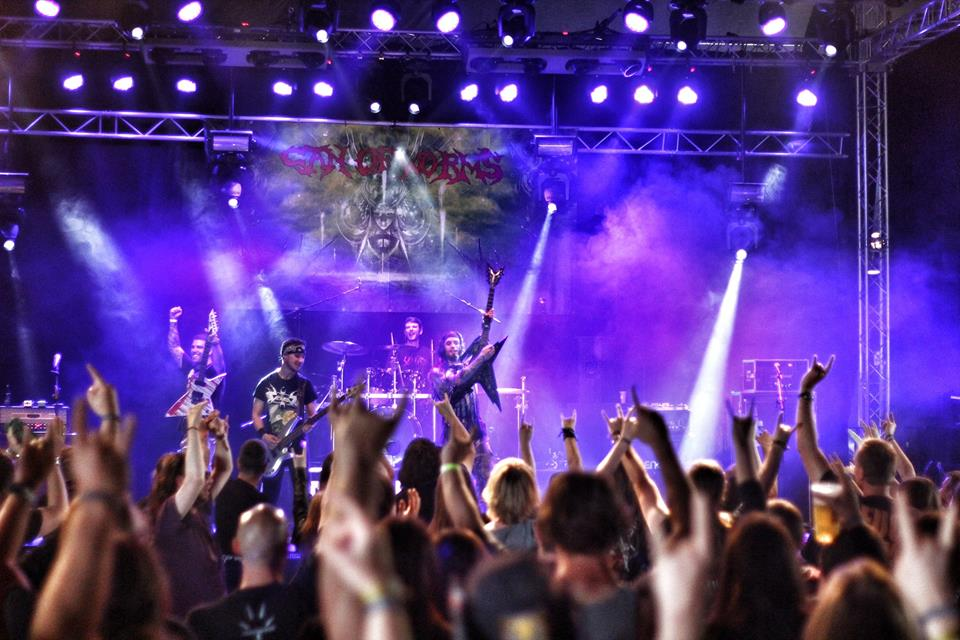
- Can of Worms at Dong Open Air, 2016

Background information
- Origin: Bayonne, France
- Genre: thrash metal / death metal
- Years active: 2005–present
- Label: Great Dane Records
- Website: canofworms.fr

Can of Worms is a French thrash/death Metal band from Bayonne formed in 2005. The band takes its name from the expression "Opening up a can of worms". Their lyrics mostly deal with Post Apocalypse Sci Fi, with references to movies like Alien, Predator or Terminator. They define their style as nuclear thrash metal.

Influenced by thrash metal bands such as Slayer, Kreator or Exodus, Can of Worms mixes death and thrash metal with two different screaming vocals, Manu performing death growl and Steven performing thrash shouted vocals.

== History ==
=== Formation ===
Created in 2005 by Steven Schriver (thrash vocals/lead guitar), Julien Tastet (bass guitar) and Patrick Talgorn (drums) joined the band in 2007, followed by Manu Iriarte (death growls/rhythm guitar) in 2009 to complete the actual line-up.

=== Recordings ===
In 2010, they self-released their first EP Thrash or Die in 2011.

The 21 December 2012, presaged the world cataclysm day, the band released their first album World Collapse recorded at the Aturri Studio and signed up with the label Great Dane Records.

In 2015, their released their second album Kult of Nuke, deals with survivors after the world cataclysm day.

Their last album called Nuclear Thrasher released in 2017, mixes their actual style with punk/Post-Hardcore influences.

=== Touring ===
The band started to tour since 2009 in France around Bayonne, and soon embarked on the French roads to open for bands such as Soulfly at the I.boat (Bordeaux) or Municipal Waste at l'Atabal (Biarritz).

In 2015, they played in the first edition of the festival Fall of Summer in Paris with bands like Carcass, Venom and Watain.

In 2016, they went on a European tour Nuke Tour 2016, especially sharing the stage with bands like Testament, Equilibrium or Fleshgod Apocalypse at the Dong Open Air in Germany

== Discography ==
Adapted from Spirit of Metal and official website

=== Studio albums ===
- 2012 : World Collapse
- 2015 : Kult of Nuke
- 2017 : Nuclear Thrasher

=== EPs ===
- 2011 : Thrash or Die

== Members ==
Current members

- Steven Schriver - thrash vocals / lead guitar (2007–present)
- Manu Iriarte - death growl / rhythm guitar (2009–present)
- Julien Tastet - vocals / bass guitar (2005–present)
- Patrick Talgorn - drums (2005–present)
