= Carpenter Brut =

French electronic music artist

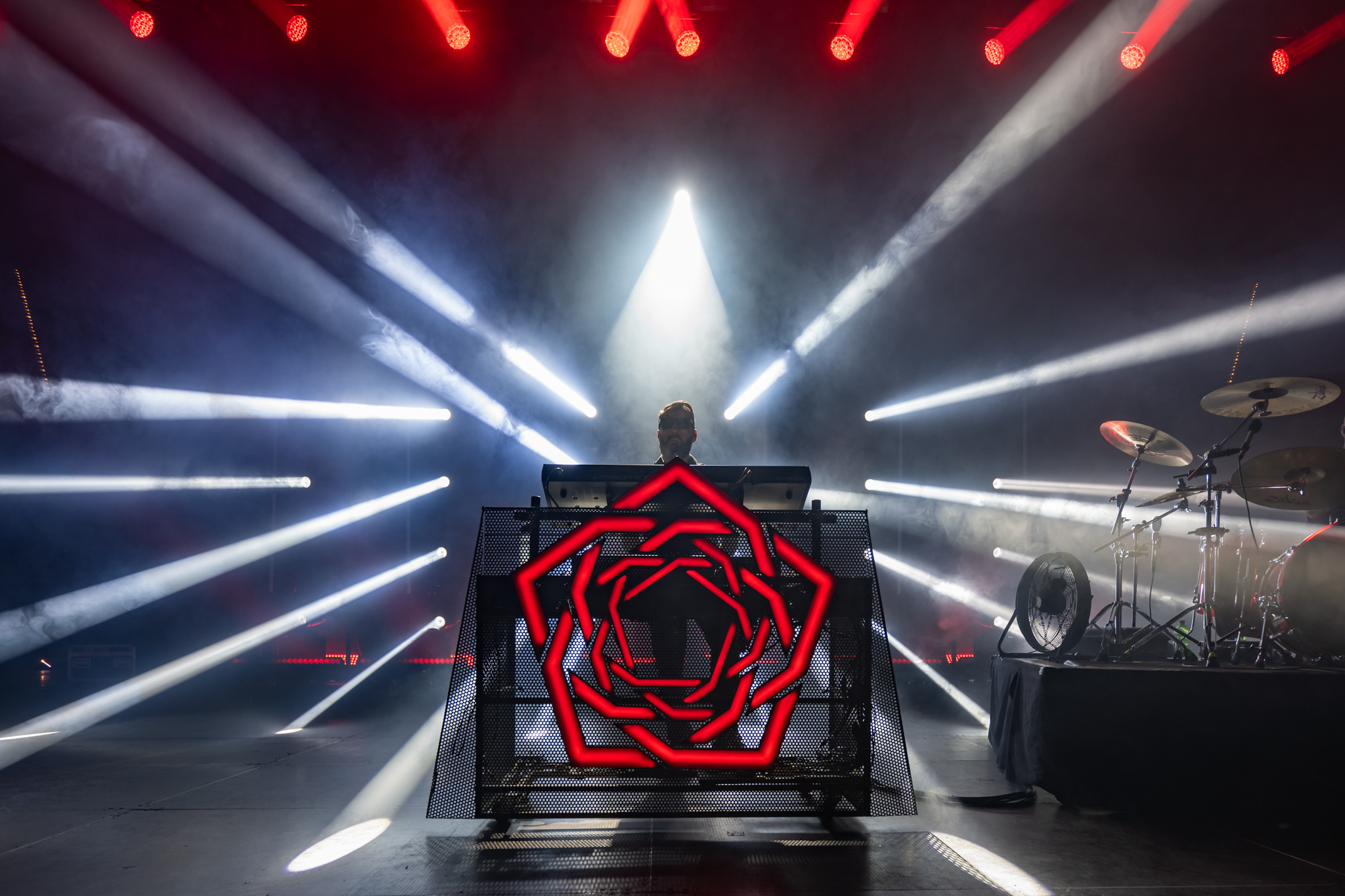
- Carpenter Brut performing with his touring band in Germany in 2023

Background information
- Born: Franck Hueso; 1977 (age 49); Poitiers, France
- Genres: Darksynth, French electro, Italo disco revival, progressive metal
- Years active: 2012–present
- Label: No Quarter Prod
- Website: carpenterbrut.bandcamp.com

Franck Hueso, better known by his stage name Carpenter Brut, is a French darksynth musician from Poitiers, France. He first released three EPs, EP I (2012), EP II (2013) and EP III (2015), which were later released together as his debut album Trilogy (2015). He has since released four additional studio albums, Leather Teeth (2018), Blood Machines OST (2020), Leather Terror (2022), and Leather Temple (2026) along with one live album, CarpenterBrutLive (2017). He has also contributed original music to a variety of soundtracks, both for film and video games.

Carpenter Brut claims his relative anonymity is a deliberate artistic choice in order to place more importance on the music itself, rather than the identity of the musician behind it. He started writing music as Carpenter Brut with the intention of mixing sounds from horror films, metal, rock, and electronic music. In live performances, Carpenter Brut is joined on stage by guitarist Adrien Grousset and drummer Florent Marcadet, both from the French metal band Hacride.

== History ==
=== Origins ===
Hueso describes the beginnings of Carpenter Brut as "a joke," and contends that the name Carpenter Brut is a play on words, derived from the surname of filmmaker and composer John Carpenter and the champagne Charpentier Brut. The idea to make electronic music stemmed from wanting to write music alone rather than being in a band, with Hueso explaining in 2017 that "Electro music is perfect for that, especially when you’re not a good musician like me. I don’t know how to play guitar; it would have been a poor decision."

=== EPs and Trilogy (2012–2015) ===
Carpenter Brut's 2012 and 2013 EPs were released on BlackBvs Records. The third EP, in 2015 (and all subsequent releases, as of April 2020), were released on Hueso's own No Quarter Prod label. The label was created with the intention of allowing Hueso to remain independent and maintain control over his own image and art. Additionally, two songs from TRILOGY (Le Perv and Roller Mobster) were used in the soundtrack for Hotline Miami 2: Wrong Number. The track "Escape from Midwich Valley" was used in one of the game's trailers.

When working on a trailer for Festival de l’Etrange, director duo Raphaël Hernandez and Savitri Joly-Gonfard (working under the name Seth Ickerman) approached Hueso with the request to use the track "Hang'em All" for the trailer's soundtrack. Having been aware of the duo and liking their "DIY and smart" approach to their work, Hueso allowed use of the track and Ickerman went on to direct all of Carpenter Brut's music videos for the first three EP's. For the music video to "Turbo Killer," Hueso gave "carte blanche" to the directors, with the only stipulation that they "give birth to certain characters" he had in mind. Hueso saw the video two weeks before its wide release and described his reaction to it as "thrilled [...] like a kid opening his Christmas presents," and wondering "how the fuck did they do that?"

=== Leather Teeth (2018) ===
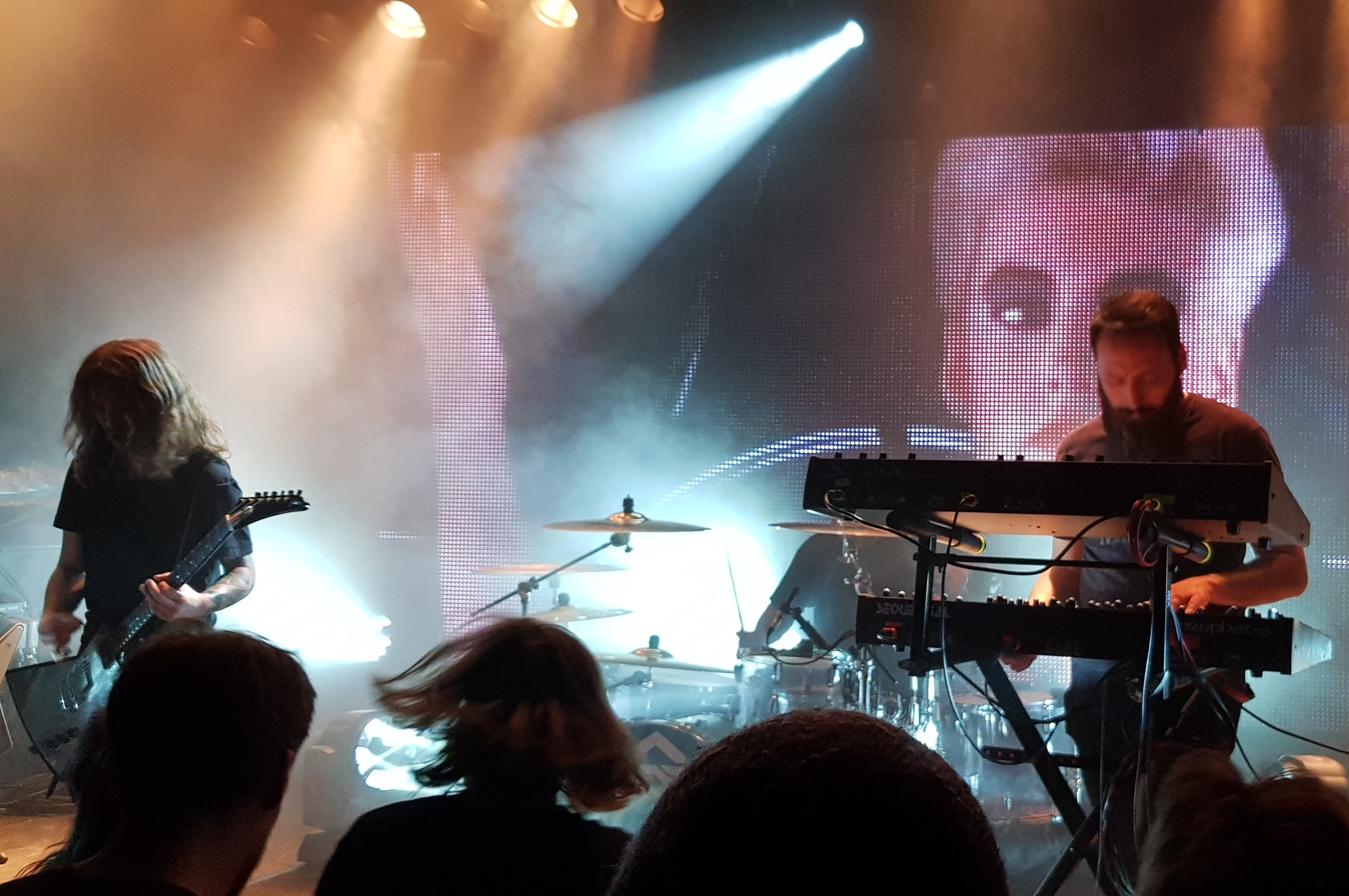
Carpenter Brut (right) performing with his touring band in Hamburg, Germany in 2018

Carpenter Brut's second full-length album was surprise released at midnight on February 22, 2018. A press release accompanying the release read: "Leather Teeth is the soundtrack to a movie envisioned by Carpenter Brut, one that tells the story of a shy American teenager, Bret Halford, who can't get the girl and will do anything he can to win her over, including becoming the singer of one of the most talked about bands in mid-'80s glam-metal, Leather Patrol." The press release included a quote from Carpenter Brut, describing the album as "pure frenzy like Master of Puppets, or any of the good old metal albums." Leather Teeth features Kristoffer Rygg of Ulver and Mat McNerney of Grave Pleasures on vocals. The music videos for the album were directed by Silver Strain, who also created the visuals projected during Carpenter Brut's live performances.

In a December 2018 interview, Hueso explained that Leather Teeth was inspired by "Judas Priest, and the glam rock of the '80s." It is the first album in a trilogy and tells the story of "[a] main character [who] is still a young student in love, and not yet the serial killer he will become in the second part of the trilogy. Even if he has tantrums as in 'Monday Hunt' or 'Hairspray Hurricane', he is still convinced that he can conquer Kendra, the cheerleader." Hueso described himself, in a 2018 interview, as being "tired of this race to whoever makes the darkest or most brutal music, it’s just bullshit," while describing Leather Teeth's sound as being "softer" and "more glamorous" than Trilogy "while flirting with a dark side that will be developed in the next album," a sequel which he intends to be "darker and more violent."

=== Blood Machines OST (2020) ===
Carpenter Brut provided the soundtrack for Blood Machines, a 50-minute film directed by the duo Seth Ickerman, directors of the "Turbo Killer" music video. Ickerman had wanted to make a feature length film using a Carpenter Brut soundtrack prior to the release of the Turbo Killer music video. Due to the success of Turbo Killer and fan requests for a follow-up, Blood Machines entered development. It is considered a sequel to the Turbo Killer music video and, as with their earlier collaborations, Ickerman had "free rein" in terms of the visuals, with Hueso describing himself as being "in charge of the soundtrack." In December 2016, David Sandberg, director of Kung Fury (2015), signed on to Blood Machines as producer. A press release for the announcement described the film's plot as "following two space hunters chasing the female ghost of a machine through the galaxy." A successful Kickstarter campaign saw the film jump from an estimated run time of 30 minutes to 50 minutes, and a trailer for the film was released to Kickstarter backers on 20 May 2020 and on Shudder the following day. Carpenter Brut released the Blood Machines OST in April 2020. The official synopsis reads:

Two space hunters are tracking down a machine trying to free itself. After taking it down, they witness a mystical phenomenon: the ghost of a young woman pulls itself out of the machine, as if the spaceship had a soul. Trying to understand the nature of this entity, they start chasing the woman through space...

==== Cast ====
The cast consists of:

- Elisa Lasowski as Corey (a priestess)
- Anders Heinrichsen as Vascan (spaceship captain)
- Christian Erickson as Lago (spaceship mechanic)
- Joëlle Berckmans as Mima (a ghost)
- Noémie Stevens as Tracy
- Natasha Cashman as Bald
- Walter Dickerson as Galdor
- Marion Levavasseur as Bulk

=== Leather Terror (2022) ===
Hueso had suggested that a new Carpenter Brut album may be released by the end of 2020 "at the very earliest." On May 19, 2021, he announced on Twitter that Leather Terror would be out early 2022, which was later dated for release on April 1, 2022. The album involves a "reinvention" of Carpenter Brut and taking the music "on a darker path." It is a continuation of the Leather Teeth trilogy and involves a story of "a character who wants to take revenge on the cheerleader who’s been making fun of him 'serial killer style'." The album includes 12 tracks, with a North American and European tour to follow. Hueso described one track of the album as "really long, really violent, and which will have much more of a black metal vibe to it. The ending will go on for about five minutes and will consist of only blast beats." Hueso suggested Ben Koller of Converge would perform on the track.

=== Other appearances ===
Hueso wrote music for the 2016 video game Furi, a process which he described as being "a lot less free" than composing music for Carpenter Brut. Hueso explained that he was required to work with scenes that the video game designers sent, while also working with loops that can go on for several minutes if the player decided to stay in the same place. Ultimately, Hueso described it as "a good experience," but wasn't sure he would attempt it again, citing a greater affinity for soundtracks for film than video games.

In 2018, Hueso and Ghost released a remix of the Ghost song "Dance Macabre". In an interview with Loudwire, lead singer Tobias Forge revealed that Hueso was also the producer for Deathspell Omega.

In 2019, Hueso appeared in the documentary film The Rise of the Synths, which explored the origins and growth of the genre. Hueso appeared alongside various other composers from the synthwave scene, including John Carpenter himself, who also starred in and narrated the film.

== Influences ==
"At the very beginning," Hueso commented, Carpenter Brut was influenced by Justice, but by 2017 he would be "much more inspired by prog rock artists," like Toto and Supertramp along with Iron Maiden, Meshuggah, Ulver, Nine Inch Nails, Type O Negative, Pink Floyd and The Beatles. In a 2019 interview with Kerrang!, Hueso stated that his early musical influences included Iron Maiden, Metallica, Megadeth, Cannibal Corpse and Napalm Death. Hueso claimed in 2016 to not listen to horror movie soundtracks, but noted there were "themes that stand out," such as Creepshow, Maniac Cop and Friday the 13th and that he does enjoy the compositions of John Williams, John Carpenter, Alan Silvestri and James Horner.

Cinematically, Hueso's influences include 1980s "Slasher/Horror/B-movies as well as blockbusters," and Hueso has specifically noted, "everything from Steven Spielberg" along with Star Wars, The Terminator, RoboCop, Predator, The Thing, Street Trash, Bad Taste, The Texas Chain Saw Massacre, The Evil Dead, Nekromantik and Maniac Cop, commenting, "not only did I find that these films were totally badass, but their soundtracks were too. Music was an integral part of the movies, that’s what I enjoyed." Ultimately he concluded that, "those influences run through everything Carpenter Brut does: the desire to give you something violent, cinematic and fun!"

Hueso bases his live performances on those of Trent Reznor of Nine Inch Nails, stating "I didn’t like playing live at the beginning [...] I just wanted to make music in my room. When it became clear that people wanted me to play I worked hard to put on a real show. It’s the same as Trent Reznor with Nine Inch Nails: if I’m going to play live, it needs to be huge."

== Discography ==
=== Albums ===
- Trilogy (2015) – A compilation of the three Carpenter Brut EPs.
- Leather Teeth (2018)
- Leather Terror (2022)
- Leather Temple (2026)

=== EPs ===
- EP I (2012)
- EP II (2013)
- EP III (2015)

=== Live albums ===
- CarpenterBrutLive (2017)

=== Remixes ===
- Scanners – Control (Carpenter Brut Remix) (2013)
- Le Couleur – Vacances de 87 (Carpenter Brut Remix) (2013)
- Scattle – Remorse (Carpenter Brut Remix) (2014)
- Gunship – Tech Noir (Carpenter Brut Remix) (2015)
- M|O|O|N – Dust (Carpenter Brut Remix) (2015)
- Ghost – Dance Macabre (Carpenter Brut Remix) (2018)
- League of Legends – Phoenix (Carpenter Brut Remix) (2019)
- Ulver – Machine Guns and Peacock Feathers (Carpenter Brut Remix) (2021)

=== Single track releases ===
- "New York Duke" (2012)
- "Chew Bubblegum..." (2014) – Bandcamp Subscriber Exclusive Track
- "The Good Old Call" (2014) – Bandcamp Subscriber Exclusive Track
- "Mandarin Claws" (2014) – Bandcamp Subscriber Exclusive Track
- "Hush Sally, Hush!" (2019) – Bandcamp Subscriber Exclusive Track
- "Maniac" featuring Yann Ligner (2020)
- "Fab Tool" featuring David Eugene Edwards (2020)
- "Imaginary Fire" featuring Greg Puciato (2022)
- "The Widow Maker" featuring Gunship (2022)

=== Other appearances ===
- Perturbator – Dangerous Days (2014) (track, "Complete Domination (Feat. Carpenter Brut)")
- The Midnight - Syndicate (2025) (track, "First Night in Paris (feat. Carpenter Brut)")
- Sending Hearts To All My Dearies: A Tribute To The Smashing Pumpkins (2026) (track, "Cherub Rock")

=== Soundtracks ===
- Rage (2013) (contributor; "Warzone")
- Hacknet (2015) (contributor; "Roller Mobster")
- Night Fare (2015) (contributor; "Le Perv", "Wake up the President")
- Furi (2016) (contributor; "Time to Wake Up", "Enraged", "What We Fight for", "You're Mine")
- The Rise of the Synths (2017) (contributor; "Night Stalker")
- Hotline Miami 2: Wrong Number (2015) (contributor; "Le Perv", "Escape From Midwich Valley", "Roller Mobster")
  - Hotline Miami 2: Wrong Number - Digital Special Edition (contributor; "M|O|O|N - Dust (Carpenter Brut Remix)", "Scattle - Remorse (Carpenter Brut Remix)")
- Blood Machines OST (2020)

== Awards and nominations ==
- 2016: Berlin Music Video Awards, Best VFX for 'TURBO KILLER'
- 2026: Berlin Music Video Awards, Best Animation for "THE MISFITS / THE REBELS" (Nominated)
