= Synthwave =

Music genre

- An interpretative illustration featuring the common visual motifs of synthwave as an Internet aesthetic
- Other names: Retrowave; future synth
- Stylistic origins: Electronic; synth-pop; new wave; 1980s film soundtracks; electro; Eurodisco; French house; video game music; Italo disco; chiptune
- Cultural origins: Mid-to late 2000s; France, Western Europe

Subgenres
- Darksynth; dreamwave; Outrun; scifiwave; spacewave

Other topics
- Eurobeat; synth-pop; vaporwave; new wave

Synthwave (also called retrowave, or futuresynth) is an electronic music microgenre that is based predominantly on the music associated with the soundtracks of action, science fiction, and horror films of the 1970s and 1980s. Other influences are drawn from the decade's art and video games. Synthwave musicians often espouse nostalgia for 1980s culture and attempt to capture the era's atmosphere and celebrate it.

The genre developed in the mid-to late 2000s through French house producers, as well as younger artists who were inspired by the 2002 video game Grand Theft Auto: Vice City. Other reference points included composers John Carpenter, Jean-Michel Jarre, Vangelis (especially his score for the 1982 film Blade Runner), and Tangerine Dream. Synthwave reached wider popularity after being featured in the soundtracks of the 2011 film Drive (which included some of the genre's best-known songs), the 2012 video game Hotline Miami as well as its 2015 sequel, the 2017 film Thor: Ragnarok, and the Netflix series Stranger Things.

== Characteristics and related terms ==
Our Ghosts – "My First Day at the Retro Game Corps"
An example of a synthwave song.

Synthwave is a microgenre of electronic music that draws predominantly from 1980s films, video games, and cartoons, as well as composers such as John Carpenter, Jean-Michel Jarre, Vangelis, and Tangerine Dream. Other reference points include electronic dance music genres including house, synth, and nu-disco. Some artists, like Dance With The Dead and Zombie Hyperdrive also include elements of 1980s rock and metal music. It is primarily an instrumental genre, although there are occasional exceptions to the rule. Common tempos are between 80 and 118 BPM, while more upbeat tracks may be between 128 and 140 BPM.

"Outrun" is a subgenre of synthwave that was later used to refer more generally to retro 1980s aesthetics such as VHS tracking artefacts, magenta neon, and gridlines. The term comes from the 1986 arcade racing game Out Run, which is known for its soundtrack that could be selected in-game and its 1980s aesthetic. There is also a visual component on synthwave album covers and music videos. According to PC Gamer, the essence of outrun visuals is "taking elements of a period of '80s excess millennials find irresistibly evocative, and modernizing them so they're just barely recognizable."

Early music journalism on emerging synthwave referred to Kavinsky and related artists as "retro electro". Journalist Julia Neuman later cited "outrun", "futuresynth", and "retrowave" as alternative terms for synthwave while author Nicholas Diak wrote that "retrowave" was an umbrella term that encompasses 1980s revivalism genres such as synthwave and vaporwave.

Synthwave subgenres include dreamwave, darksynth, and scifiwave. Darksynth is influenced by horror cinema. Invisible Oranges wrote that darksynth is exemplified mainly by a shift away from the bright "Miami Vice vibes" and "French electro house influences" and "toward the darker electronic terrains of horror movie maestro composers John Carpenter and Goblin" also infused with sounds from post-punk, industrial and EBM.

== Origins ==
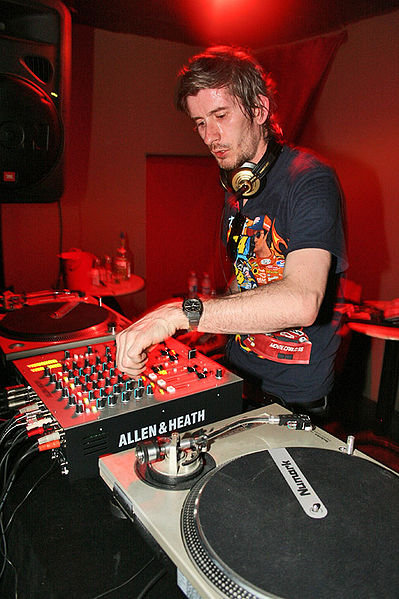
Kavinsky performing in 2007

Synthwave originates from the mid to late 2000s. Diak traced the genre to a broader trend involving young artists whose works drew from their childhoods in the 1980s. He credited the success of the 2002 video game Grand Theft Auto: Vice City with shifting "attitudes toward the '80s ... from parody and ambivalence to that of homage and reverence", leading directly to genres such as synthwave and vaporwave. The influence of Vice City was also noted by MusicRadar. Molly Lambert of MTV noted the song "Love on a Real Train" by Tangerine Dream in the film Risky Business (1983) was a major influence, with "ornately repetitive synth patterns, hypnotic chimes, and percussive choogling drum machines".

The mid-2000s French house acts David Grellier (College), and Kavinsky, who had created music in the style of 1980s film scores, were among the earliest artists to be part of the emergence of synthwave. Grellier credits artists of the primarily French bloghouse scene as a major predecessor of synthwave. Key reference points for early synthwave included the 1982 film Blade Runner (both the soundtrack and the film itself), 8- and 16-bit video games, 1980s jingles for VHS production companies, and television news broadcasts and advertisements from that era. According to NME and MusicRadar, the 2011 film Drive was a major influence on synthwave, and included a track by Kavinsky, "Nightcall" in the film's soundtrack, as well as David Grellier, Johnny Jewel, and several tracks by Cliff Martinez. EDM.com described Kavinsky as a "synthwave pioneer", while the horror blog Bloody Disgusting describes Carpenter Brut as a "synthwave icon".

== Popularity and legacy ==
In the early 2010s, the synthwave soundtracks of films such as Drive and Tron: Legacy attracted new fans and artists to the genre. Drive featured Kavinsky's "Nightcall" and "A Real Hero" by College and Electric Youth, which catapulted synthwave into mainstream recognition and solidified its stature as a music genre. The genre's popularity was furthered through its presence in the soundtracks of video games like Far Cry 3: Blood Dragon and Hotline Miami, as well as the Netflix series Stranger Things, which featured synthwave pieces that complemented the show's 1980s setting. Nerdglow's Christopher Higgins cited Electric Youth and Kavinsky as the two most popular artists in synthwave in 2014.

Synthwave remained a niche genre throughout the 2010s. In 2017, PC Gamer noted that synthwave influences were to be felt in early 2010s gaming releases, primarily of the "outrun" subgenre, including Hotline Miami and Far Cry 3: Blood Dragon. Writing in 2019, PopMatters journalist Preston Cram said, "Despite its significant presence and the high level of enthusiasm about it, synthwave in its complete form remains a primarily underground form of music." He added that "Nightcall" and "A Real Hero" remained "two of only a small number of synthwave songs produced to date that [are] widely known outside the genre's followers."

The 2019 virtual reality game Boneworks heavily features the synthwave genre in its soundtrack, which was composed by Michael Wyckoff.

In 2020, "Blinding Lights", a synthwave-influenced song by R&B artist the Weeknd topped US record charts, the first song to do so during the COVID-19 pandemic. Matt Mills of Louder wrote in 2021 that the genre "had exploded into the mainstream, cramming dancefloors and soundtracking blockbusters."

== See also ==
- The Rise of the Synths
- 1980s in music
- 1980s nostalgia
- '80s remix
- Cyberspace
- Chillwave
- Cyberpunk
- Vaporwave
- Sovietwave
- Miami Vice Theme
- Aztec Records
- Shredder 1984
- Lofi Girl
- Moonbeam City
- Drive (2011 film)
- Hurry Up, We're Dreaming
- Party Hard (video game)
