= San Diego Film Critics Society Awards 2011 =

Annual US film awards ceremony

16th SDFCS Awards

December 14, 2011

Best Film:
The Artist

Best Director:
Nicolas Winding Refn
Drive

The 16th San Diego Film Critics Society Awards were announced on December 12, 2011.

== Winners and nominees ==
=== Best Actor ===
Michael Shannon – Take Shelter as Curtis LaForche

- George Clooney – The Descendants as Matt King
- Jean Dujardin – The Artist as George Valentin
- Brendan Gleeson – The Guard as Gerry Boyle
- Brad Pitt – Moneyball as Billy Bean

=== Best Actress ===
Brit Marling – Another Earth as Rhoda Williams

- Viola Davis – The Help as Aibileen Clarke
- Elizabeth Olsen – Martha Marcy May Marlene as Martha
- Tilda Swinton – We Need to Talk About Kevin as Eve Khatchadourian
- Michelle Williams – My Week with Marilyn as Marilyn Monroe

=== Best Animated Film ===
Arthur Christmas

- Happy Feet Two
- Kung Fu Panda 2
- Rango
- Winnie the Pooh

=== Best Cinematography ===
The Tree of Life – Emmanuel Lubezki

- The Artist – Guillaume Schiffman
- Drive – Newton Thomas Sigel
- Hugo – Robert Richardson
- Take Shelter – Adam Stone

=== Best Director ===
Nicolas Winding Refn – Drive

- Woody Allen – Midnight in Paris
- Michel Hazanavicius – The Artist
- Terrence Malick – The Tree of Life
- Martin Scorsese – Hugo

=== Best Documentary ===
Project Nim

- Buck
- Cave of Forgotten Dreams
- Into the Abyss
- Page One: Inside the New York Times

=== Best Editing ===
Beginners – Olivier Bugge Coutté

- The Artist – Anne-Sophie Bion and Michel Hazanavicius
- Drive – Mat Newman
- Hugo – Thelma Schoonmaker
- The Tree of Life – Hank Corwin, Jay Rabinowitz, Daniel Rezende, Billy Weber and Mark Yoshikawa

=== Best Ensemble Performance ===
Harry Potter and the Deathly Hallows – Part 2

- Carnage
- The Help
- Margin Call
- Midnight in Paris

=== Best Film ===
The Artist

- Drive
- Hugo
- Midnight in Paris
- The Tree of Life

=== Best Foreign Language Film ===
Le Quattro Volte • Italy

- The Double Hour (La doppia ora) • Italy
- Happy, Happy (Sykt lykkelig) • Norway
- Of Gods and Men (Des hommes et des dieux) • France
- A Somewhat Gentle Man (En ganske snill mann) • Norway

=== Best Production Design ===
Hugo – Dante Ferretti

- The Artist – Laurence Bennett
- Harry Potter and the Deathly Hallows – Part 2 – Stuart Craig
- Midnight in Paris – Anne Seibel
- The Tree of Life – Jack Fisk

=== Best Score ===
Harry Potter and the Deathly Hallows – Part 2 – Alexandre Desplat

- The Artist – Ludovic Bource
- Extremely Loud and Incredibly Close – Alexandre Desplat
- Hugo – Howard Shore
- The Tree of Life – Alexandre Desplat

=== Best Original Screenplay ===
Midnight in Paris – Woody Allen

- 50/50 – Will Reiser
- The Artist – Michel Hazanavicius
- Beginners – Mike Mills
- Win Win – Tom McCarthy

=== Best Adapted Screenplay ===
Moneyball – Steve Zaillian and Aaron Sorkin

- The Descendants – Alexander Payne, Nat Faxon and Jim Rash
- Drive – Hossein Amini
- Harry Potter and the Deathly Hallows – Part 2 – Steve Kloves
- Hugo – John Logan

=== Best Supporting Actor ===
Nick Nolte – Warrior as Paddy Conlon

- Albert Brooks – Drive as Bernie Rose
- Christopher Plummer – Beginners as Hal Fields
- Andy Serkis – Rise of the Planet of the Apes as Caesar
- Max von Sydow – Extremely Loud and Incredibly Close as The Renter

=== Best Supporting Actress ===
Shailene Woodley – The Descendants as Alexandra King

- Bérénice Bejo – The Artist as Peppy Miller
- Jessica Chastain – The Help as Celia Foote
- Mélanie Laurent – Beginners as Anna
- Carey Mulligan – Shame as Sissy Sullivan

=== Body of Work ===
- Jessica Chastain
