= 11th AARP Movies for Grownups Awards =

Film award ceremony

- Date: February 6, 2012
- Hosted by: Michael Nouri

Highlights
- Most nominations: Midnight in Paris (6)

The 11th AARP Movies for Grownups Awards, presented by AARP the Magazine, honored films released in 2011 and were announced on January 20, 2012. The ceremony was hosted by actor Michael Nouri on February 6, 2012 at the Beverly Wilshire Hotel in Los Angeles. Sharon Stone was the winner of the annual Career Achievement Award, and Martin Scorsese won the award for Breakthrough Achievement for his film, Hugo.

== Awards ==
=== Winners and nominees ===
Winners are listed first, highlighted in boldface, and indicated with a double dagger (‡).

**Best Movie for Grownups**: **The Descendants**‡; The Artist; Extremely Loud and Incredibly Close; Midnight in Paris; War Horse; Win Win	**Best Director**: **Stephen Daldry – Extremely Loud and Incredibly Close**‡; Woody Allen - Midnight in Paris; George Clooney - The Ides of March; Cameron Crowe - We Bought a Zoo; Terrence Malick - The Tree of Life; Martin Scorsese - Hugo
**Best Actor**: **Oliver Litondo - The First Grader**‡; George Clooney - The Descendants; Mel Gibson - The Beaver; Gary Oldman - Tinker Tailor Soldier Spy; Kevin Spacey - Margin Call	**Best Actress**: **Glenn Close - Albert Nobbs**‡; Ellen Barkin - Another Happy Day; Helen Mirren - The Debt; Meryl Streep - The Iron Lady; Tilda Swinton - We Need to Talk About Kevin
**Best Supporting Actor**: **Christopher Plummer - Beginners**‡; Jeremy Irons - Margin Call; Ben Kingsley - Hugo; Max von Sydow - Extremely Loud and Incredibly Close; Christoph Waltz - Water for Elephants	**Best Supporting Actress**: **Vanessa Redgrave - Coriolanus**‡; Ellen Burstyn - Another Happy Day; Judi Dench - J. Edgar; Allison Janney - The Help; Janet McTeer - Albert Nobbs
**Best Comedy**: **The Artist**‡; 50/50; Bridesmaids; Midnight in Paris; Tower Heist	**Best Screenwriter**: **Woody Allen - Midnight in Paris**‡; Alexander Payne - The Descendants; Eric Roth - Extremely Loud and Incredibly Close; Roger Simon - A Better Life; Steven Zaillian and Aaron Sorkin - Moneyball
**Best Time Capsule**: **J. Edgar**‡; The Help; The Iron Lady; Midnight in Paris	**Best Intergenerational Film**: **Win Win**‡; The First Grader; Hugo; The Music Never Stopped
**Best Grownup Love Story**: **Meryl Streep and Jim Broadbent - The Iron Lady**‡; Emily Watson and Peter Mullan - War Horse; Jodie Foster and Mel Gibson - The Beaver; Leonardo DiCaprio and Armie Hammer - J. Edgar	**Musical Achievement**: **Alexandre Desplat - The Tree of Life (film)**‡; John Williams - War Horse
**Best Movie for Grownups Who Refuse to Grow Up**: **The Muppets**‡; Dolphin Tale; Harry Potter and the Deathly Hallows – Part 2; Hugo	**Best Documentary**: **Bill Cunningham New York**‡; Hot Coffee; The Interrupters; Project Nim; Undefeated
**Best Foreign Film**: **The Names of Love - France**‡; 80 Days - Spain; In Darkness - Poland; Queen to Play - France; The Skin I Live In - Cinema of Spain	**Readers' Choice**: **The Help**‡; The Artist; The Descendants; Extremely Loud and Incredibly Close; Hugo; Margin Call; Midnight in Paris; Moneyball; War Horse; We Bought a Zoo

=== Career Achievement Award ===
- Sharon Stone

=== Breakthrough Accomplishment ===
- Martin Scorsese: "Scorsese’s first-time use of 3-D technology transforms the screen into the most spectacular pop-up book you’ve ever seen."

=== Films with multiple nominations ===
Films that received multiple nominations
Nominations	Film
6	Midnight in Paris
5	Extremely Loud and Incredibly Close
5	Hugo
4	The Descendants
4	War Horse
3	The Artist
3	The Help
3	The Iron Lady
3	J. Edgar
3	Margin Call
2	Albert Nobbs
2	Another Happy Day
2	The Beaver
2	The First Grader
2	Moneyball
2	The Tree of Life
2	We Bought a Zoo
2	Win Win
