= 17th Critics' Choice Awards =

2012 US film awards

- Date: January 12, 2012
- Hosted by: Rob Huebel; Paul Scheer
- Official website: www.criticschoice.com

Highlights
- Best Film: The Artist
- Most awards: The Artist (4)
- Most nominations: The Artist (11); Hugo (11)

Television coverage
- Network: VH1

The 17th Critics' Choice Awards were presented on January 12, 2012 at the Hollywood Palladium, honoring the finest achievements of 2011 filmmaking. The ceremony was broadcast on VH1, and hosted by Rob Huebel and Paul Scheer. The nominees were announced on December 13, 2011.

== Winners and nominees ==
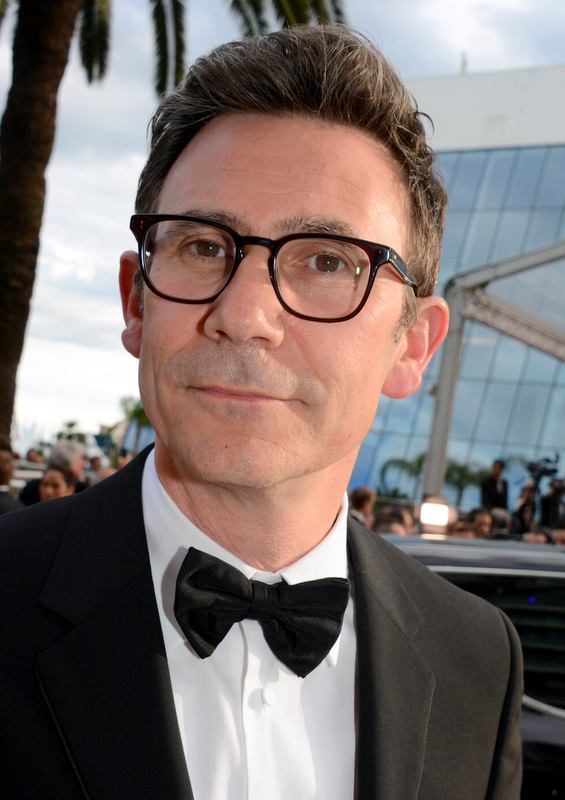
Michel Hazanavicius, Best Director winner

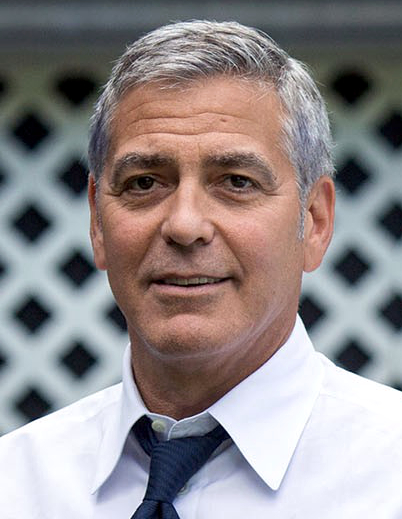
George Clooney, Best Actor winner

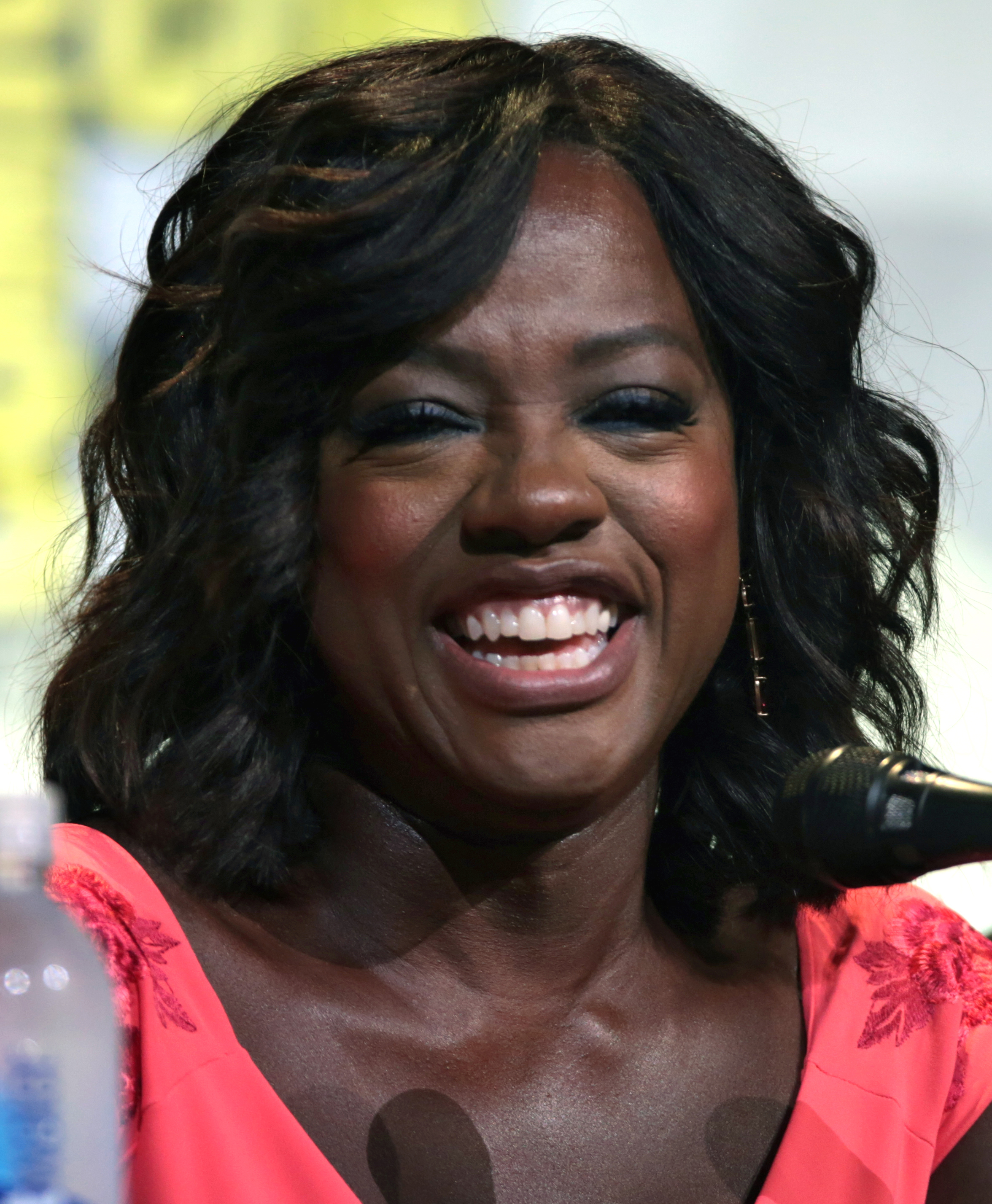
Viola Davis, Best Actress winner

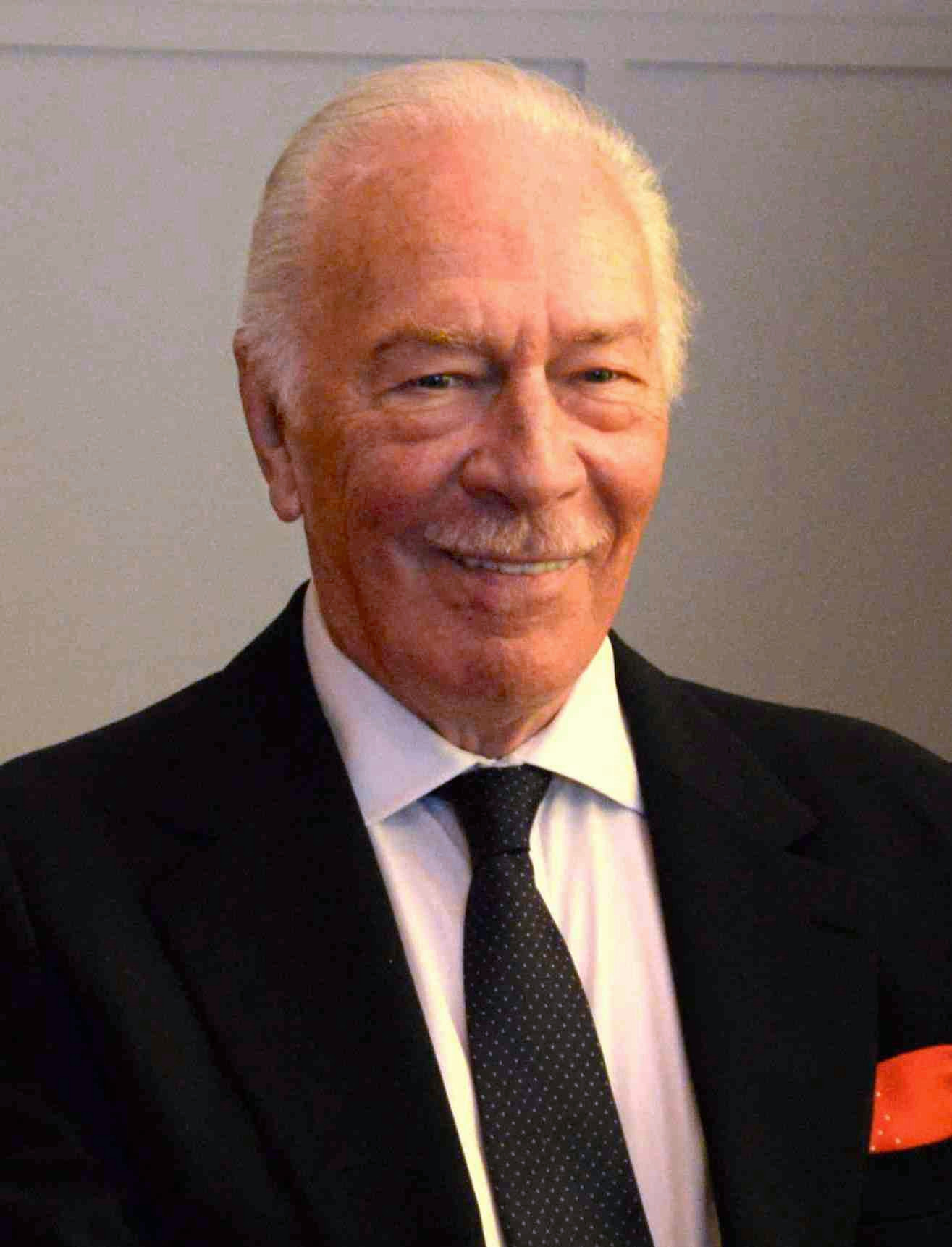
Christopher Plummer, Best Supporting Actor winner

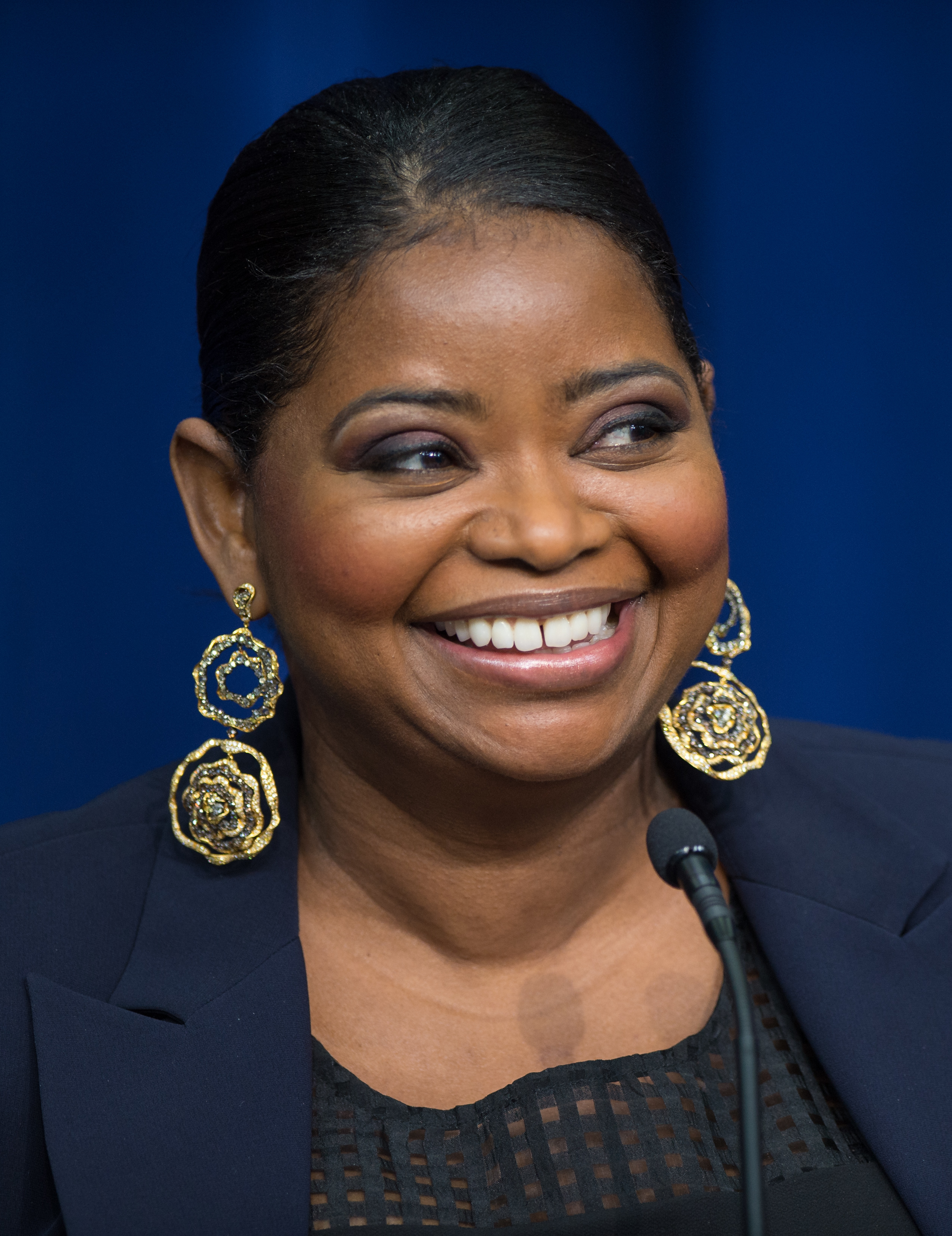
Octavia Spencer, Best Supporting Actress winner

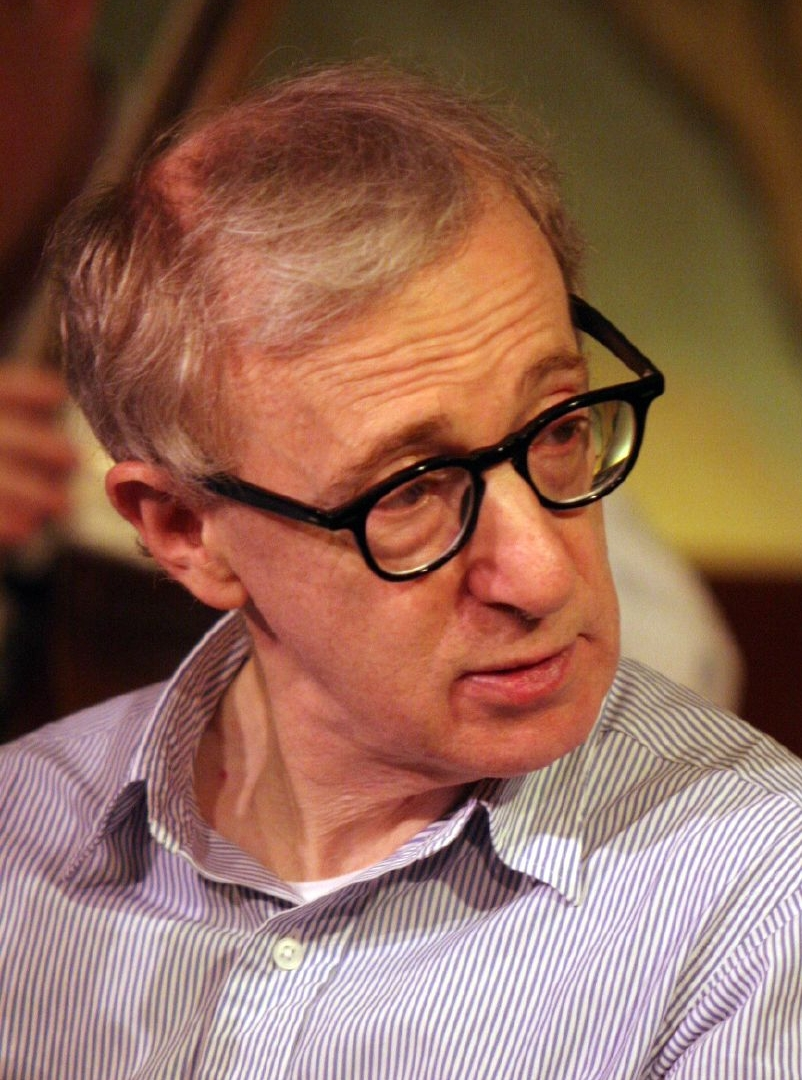
Woody Allen, Best Original Screenplay winner

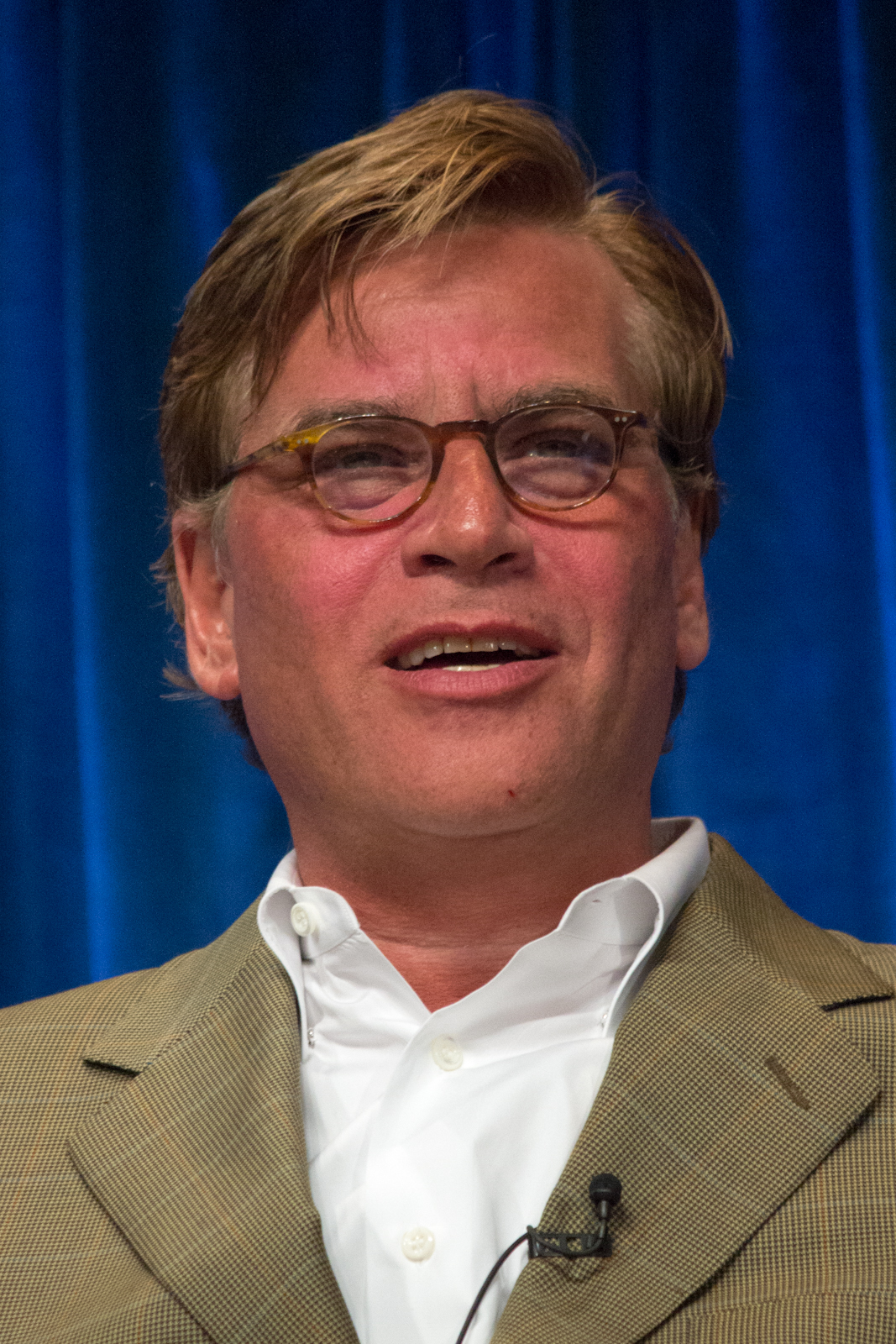
Aaron Sorkin, Best Adapted Screenplay co-winner

Best Picture The Artist: The Descendants; Drive; Extremely Loud & Incredibly Close; The Help; Hugo; Midnight in Paris; Moneyball; The Tree of Life; War Horse	Best Director Michel Hazanavicius – The Artist: Stephen Daldry – Extremely Loud & Incredibly Close; Alexander Payne – The Descendants; Nicolas Winding Refn – Drive; Martin Scorsese – Hugo; Steven Spielberg – War Horse
Best Actor George Clooney – The Descendants as Matt King: Leonardo DiCaprio – J. Edgar as J. Edgar Hoover; Jean Dujardin – The Artist as George Valentin; Michael Fassbender – Shame as Brandon Sullivan; Ryan Gosling – Drive as Driver; Brad Pitt – Moneyball as Billy Beane	Best Actress Viola Davis – The Help as Aibileen Clark: Elizabeth Olsen – Martha Marcy May Marlene as Martha/Marcy May/Marlene Lewis; Meryl Streep – The Iron Lady as Margaret Thatcher; Tilda Swinton – We Need to Talk About Kevin as Eva Khatchadourian; Charlize Theron – Young Adult as Mavis Gary; Michelle Williams – My Week with Marilyn as Marilyn Monroe
Best Supporting Actor Christopher Plummer – Beginners as Hal Fields: Kenneth Branagh – My Week with Marilyn as Laurence Olivier; Albert Brooks – Drive as Bernie Rose; Nick Nolte – Warrior as Paddy Conlon; Patton Oswalt – Young Adult as Matt Freehauf; Andy Serkis – Rise of the Planet of the Apes as Caesar	Best Supporting Actress Octavia Spencer – The Help as Minny Jackson: Bérénice Bejo – The Artist as Peppy Miller; Jessica Chastain – The Help as Celia Rae Foote; Melissa McCarthy – Bridesmaids as Megan Price; Carey Mulligan – Shame as Sissy Sullivan; Shailene Woodley – The Descendants as Alex King
Best Young Actor/Actress Thomas Horn – Extremely Loud & Incredibly Close as Oskar Schell: Asa Butterfield – Hugo as Hugo Cabret; Elle Fanning – Super 8 as Alice Dainard; Ezra Miller – We Need to Talk About Kevin as Kevin Khatchadourian; Saoirse Ronan – Hanna as Hanna; Shailene Woodley – The Descendants as Alex King	Best Acting Ensemble The Help: The Artist; Bridesmaids; The Descendants; The Ides of March
Best Original Screenplay Midnight in Paris – Woody Allen: 50/50 – Will Reiser; The Artist – Michel Hazanavicius; Win Win – Tom McCarthy and Joe Tiboni; Young Adult – Diablo Cody	Best Adapted Screenplay Moneyball – Aaron Sorkin, Stan Chervin, and Steven Zaillian: The Descendants – Alexander Payne, Jim Rash, and Nat Faxon; Extremely Loud & Incredibly Close – Eric Roth; The Help – Tate Taylor; Hugo – John Logan
Best Animated Feature Rango: The Adventures of Tintin; Arthur Christmas; Kung Fu Panda 2; Puss in Boots	Best Documentary Feature George Harrison: Living in the Material World: Buck; Cave of Forgotten Dreams; Page One: Inside the New York Times; Project Nim; Undefeated
Best Action Movie Drive: Fast Five; Hanna; Rise of the Planet of the Apes; Super 8	Best Comedy Movie Bridesmaids: Crazy, Stupid, Love; Horrible Bosses; Midnight in Paris; The Muppets
Best Foreign Language Film A Separation • Iran: In Darkness • Poland; Le Havre • Finland; The Skin I Live In • Spain; Where Do We Go Now? • Lebanon	Best Art Direction Hugo – Dante Ferretti (Production Design) / Francesca Lo Schiavo (Set Decoration): The Artist – Laurence Bennett (Production Design) / Robert Gould (Set Decoration); Harry Potter and the Deathly Hallows – Part 2 – Stuart Craig (Production Design) / Stephenie McMillan (Set Decoration); The Tree of Life – Jack Fisk (Production Design) / Jeanette Scott (Set Decoration); War Horse – Rick Carter (Production Design) / Lee Sandales (Set Decoration)
Best Cinematography The Tree of Life – Emmanuel Lubezki (TIE); War Horse – Janusz Kamiński (TIE): The Artist – Guillaume Schiffman; Drive – Newton Thomas Sigel; Hugo – Robert Richardson	Best Costume Design The Artist – Mark Bridges: The Help – Sharen Davis; Hugo – Sandy Powell; Jane Eyre – Michael O'Connor; My Week with Marilyn – Jill Taylor
Best Editing The Girl with the Dragon Tattoo – Kirk Baxter and Angus Wall: The Artist – Anne-Sophie Bion and Michel Hazanavicius; Drive – Matthew Newman; Hugo – Thelma Schoonmaker; War Horse – Michael Kahn	Best Makeup Harry Potter and the Deathly Hallows – Part 2: Albert Nobbs; The Iron Lady; J. Edgar; My Week with Marilyn
Best Score The Artist – Ludovic Bource: Drive – Cliff Martinez; The Girl with the Dragon Tattoo – Trent Reznor and Atticus Ross; Hugo – Howard Shore; War Horse – John Williams	Best Song "Life's a Happy Song" – The Muppets: "Hello Hello" – Gnomeo & Juliet; "The Living Proof" – The Help; "Man or Muppet" – The Muppets; "Pictures in My Head" – The Muppets
Best Sound Harry Potter and the Deathly Hallows – Part 2: Hugo; Super 8; The Tree of Life; War Horse	Best Visual Effects Rise of the Planet of the Apes: Harry Potter and the Deathly Hallows – Part 2; Hugo; Super 8; The Tree of Life

=== Joel Siegel Award ===
Sean Penn

=== Music+Film Award ===
Martin Scorsese

== Statistics ==
Nominations	Film
11	The Artist
11	Hugo
8	Drive
8	The Help
7	The Descendants
7	War Horse
5	The Tree of Life
4	Extremely Loud & Incredibly Close
4	Harry Potter and the Deathly Hallows – Part 2
4	The Muppets
4	My Week with Marilyn
4	Super 8
3	Bridesmaids
3	Midnight in Paris
3	Moneyball
3	Rise of the Planet of the Apes
3	Young Adult
2	The Girl with the Dragon Tattoo
2	Hanna
2	The Iron Lady
2	J. Edgar
2	Shame
2	We Need to Talk About Kevin

Wins	Film
4	The Artist
3	The Help
2	Harry Potter and the Deathly Hallows – Part 2
