= Washington D.C. Area Film Critics Association Awards 2011 =

Annual US film awards ceremony

10th WAFCA Awards
- Date: December 5, 2011

Highlights
- Best Film: The Artist
- Best Director: Martin Scorsese for Hugo
- Best Actor: George Clooney
- Best Actress: Michelle Williams

The 10th Washington D.C. Area Film Critics Association Awards were given out on December 5, 2011.

== Winners and nominees ==
Best Film

- The Artist

- The Descendants
- Drive
- Hugo
- Win Win

Best Director

- Martin Scorsese – Hugo

- Woody Allen – Midnight in Paris
- Michel Hazanavicius – The Artist
- Alexander Payne – The Descendants
- Nicolas Winding Refn – Drive

Best Actor

- George Clooney – The Descendants as Matt King

- Jean Dujardin – The Artist as George Valentin
- Michael Fassbender – Shame as Brandon Sullivan
- Brad Pitt – Moneyball as Billy Beane
- Michael Shannon – Take Shelter as Curtis LaForche

Best Actress

- Michelle Williams – My Week with Marilyn as Marilyn Monroe

- Viola Davis – The Help as Aibileen Clarke
- Elizabeth Olsen – Martha Marcy May Marlene as Martha
- Meryl Streep – The Iron Lady as Margaret Thatcher
- Tilda Swinton – We Need to Talk About Kevin as Eve Khatchadourian

Best Supporting Actor

- Albert Brooks – Drive as Bernie Rose

- Kenneth Branagh – My Week with Marilyn as Laurence Olivier
- John Hawkes – Martha Marcy May Marlene as Patrick
- Christopher Plummer – Beginners as Hal
- Andy Serkis – Rise of the Planet of the Apes as Caesar

Best Supporting Actress

- Octavia Spencer – The Help as Minny Jackson

- Bérénice Bejo – The Artist as Peppy Miller
- Melissa McCarthy – Bridesmaids as Megan
- Carey Mulligan – Shame as Sissy Sullivan
- Shailene Woodley – The Descendants as Alexandra King

Best Adapted Screenplay

- The Descendants – Nat Faxon, Jim Rash, and Alexander Payne

- The Help – Tate Taylor
- Hugo – John Logan
- Moneyball – Steven Zaillian and Aaron Sorkin
- Tinker Tailor Soldier Spy – Bridget O'Connor and Peter Straughan

Best Original Screenplay

- 50/50 – Will Reiser

- The Artist – Michel Hazanavicius
- Bridesmaids – Annie Mumolo and Kristen Wiig
- Midnight in Paris – Woody Allen
- Win Win – Tom McCarthy

Best Cast

- Bridesmaids

- Harry Potter and the Deathly Hallows – Part 2
- The Help
- Hugo
- Margin Call

Best Animated Film

- Rango

- The Adventures of Tintin
- Arthur Christmas
- Puss in Boots
- Winnie the Pooh

Best Documentary Film

- Cave of Forgotten Dreams

- Being Elmo: A Puppeteer's Journey
- Buck
- Into the Abyss
- Project Nim

Best Foreign Language Film

- The Skin I Live In • Spain

- 13 Assassins • Japan
- Certified Copy • France
- I Saw the Devil • South Korea
- Pina • Germany

Best Art Direction

- Hugo

- The Artist
- Harry Potter and the Deathly Hallows – Part 2
- The Tree of Life
- War Horse

Best Cinematography

- The Tree of Life

- The Artist
- Hugo
- Melancholia
- War Horse

Best Score

- The Artist – Ludovic Bource

- Drive – Cliff Martinez
- The Girl with the Dragon Tattoo – Trent Reznor and Atticus Ross
- Hugo – Howard Shore
- War Horse – John Williams
