= Detroit Film Critics Society Award for Best Screenplay =

Annual US film award

The Detroit Film Critics Society Award for Best Screenplay is an annual award given by the Detroit Film Critics Society to honor the best screenplays of that year. The awards was first given in 2011, at the body's fifth annual ceremony.

== 2010s ==
Year	Film	Writer(s)	Source
2011	Moneyball	Aaron Sorkin and Steven Zaillian	Moneyball by Michael Lewis
2011	50/50	Will Reiser	-
2011	The Artist	Michel Hazanavicius	-
2011	Beginners	Mike Mills	-
2011	Take Shelter	Take Shelter	-
2012	Silver Linings Playbook	David O. Russell	The Silver Linings Playbook by Matthew Quick
2012	The Cabin in the Woods	Drew Goddard and Joss Whedon	-
2012	Lincoln	Tony Kushner	Team of Rivals by Doris Kearns Goodwin
2012	The Perks of Being a Wallflower	Stephen Chbosky	Novel by Stephen Chbosky
2012	Take This Waltz	Sarah Polley	-
2013	Her	Spike Jonze	-
2013	American Hustle	Eric Warren Singer and David O. Russell	-
2013	Before Midnight	Richard Linklater, Ethan Hawke, and Julie Delpy	Characters by Richard Linklater and Kim Krizan
2013	Short Term 12	Destin Daniel Cretton	-
2013	The Wolf of Wall Street	Terence Winter	Memoir by Jordan Belfort
2014	Boyhood	Richard Linklater	-
2014	Birdman or (The Unexpected Virtue of Ignorance)	Nicolás Giacobone and Alejandro G. Iñárritu	-
2014	Calvary	John Michael McDonagh	-
2014	The Grand Budapest Hotel	Wes Anderson	-
2014	Whiplash	Damien Chazelle	Short Film by Damien Chazelle
2015	Spotlight	Tom McCarthy and Josh Singer	-
2015	The Big Short	Charles Randolph and Adam McKay	The Big Short by Michael Lewis
2015	Brooklyn	Nick Hornby	Novel by Colm Tóibín
2015	The Hateful Eight	Quentin Tarantino	-
2015	Inside Out	Josh Cooley, Pete Docter, and Meg LeFauve	-
2016	La La Land	Damien Chazelle	-
2016	Arrival	Eric Heisserer	The Big Short by Ted Chiang
2016	Hell or High Water	Taylor Sheridan	-
2016	Manchester by the Sea	Kenneth Lonergan	-
2016	Moonlight	Barry Jenkins	In Moonlight Black Boys Look Blue by Tarell Alvin McCraney
2017	Three Billboards Outside Ebbing, Missouri	Martin McDonagh	-
2017	The Big Sick	Emily V. Gordon and Kumail Nanjiani	-
2017	Get Out	Jordan Peele	-
2017	Lady Bird	Greta Gerwig	-
2017	The Post	Liz Hannah and Josh Singer	-
2017	The Shape of Water	Guillermo del Toro and Vanessa Taylor	-
2017	Wind River	Taylor Sheridan	-
2018	Green Book	Nick Vallelonga, Brian Hayes Currie and Peter Farrelly	-
2018	Vice	Adam McKay	-
2018	Eighth Grade	Bo Burnham	-
2018	The Favourite	Deborah Davis and Tony McNamara	-
2018	First Reformed	Paul Schrader	-
2019	Marriage Story	Noah Baumbach	-
2019	The Irishman	Steven Zaillian	I Heard You Paint Houses by Charles Brandt
2019	The Lighthouse	Robert Eggers & Max Eggers	-
2019	Once Upon a Time in Hollywood	Quentin Tarantino	-
2019	Parasite	Bong Joon-ho & Han Jin-won	-

=== 2020s ===
- Nomadland - Chloé Zhao (adapted)/Lee Isaac Chung, Minari (original)
