= National Board of Review Awards 2011 =

Film awards edition

83rd NBR Awards
Best Film: Hugo

The 83rd Awards of the National Board of Review honored the best in film for 2011.

== Top 10 Films ==
Films listed alphabetically except top, which is ranked as Best Film of the Year:

Hugo

- The Artist
- The Descendants
- Drive
- The Girl with the Dragon Tattoo
- Harry Potter and the Deathly Hallows – Part 2
- The Ides of March
- J. Edgar
- The Tree of Life
- War Horse

== Winners ==
Best Film:

- Hugo

Best Director:

- Martin Scorsese – Hugo

Best Actor:

- George Clooney – The Descendants

Best Actress:

- Tilda Swinton – We Need to Talk About Kevin

Best Supporting Actor:

- Christopher Plummer – Beginners

Best Supporting Actress:

- Shailene Woodley – The Descendants

Best Original Screenplay:

- Will Reiser – 50/50

Best Adapted Screenplay:

- Nat Faxon & Alexander Payne & Jim Rash – The Descendants

Best Animated Feature:

- Rango

Best Foreign Film:

- A Separation

Best Documentary:

- Paradise Lost 3: Purgatory

Best Ensemble Cast:

- The Help

Breakthrough Performance:

- Felicity Jones – Like Crazy
- Rooney Mara – The Girl with the Dragon Tattoo

Spotlight Award:

- Michael Fassbender – A Dangerous Method, Jane Eyre, Shame, X-Men: First Class

Spotlight Award for Best Directorial Debut:

- J. C. Chandor – Margin Call

Special Filmmaking Achievement Award:

- The Harry Potter franchise, for "a distinguished translation from Book to Film"

NBR Freedom of Expression:

- Crime After Crime
- Pariah

== Top Foreign Films ==
A Separation

- 13 Assassins
- Elite Squad: The Enemy Within
- Footnote
- Le Havre
- Point Blank

== Top Documentaries ==
Paradise Lost 3: Purgatory

- Born to Be Wild
- Buck
- George Harrison: Living in the Material World
- Project Nim
- Senna

== Top Independent Films ==
- 50/50
- Another Earth
- Beginners
- A Better Life
- Cedar Rapids
- Margin Call
- Shame
- Take Shelter
- We Need To Talk About Kevin
- Win Win
