= Broadcast Film Critics Association Awards 2012 =

Broadcast Film Critics Association Awards 2012 may refer to:

- 17th Critics' Choice Awards, the seventeenth Critics' Choice Awards ceremony that took place in 2012
- 18th Critics' Choice Awards, the eighteenth Critics' Choice Awards ceremony that took place in 2013 and which honored the best in film for 2012
