= 50/50 (2011 film) =

- Theatrical release poster
- Directed by: Jonathan Levine
- Written by: Will Reiser
- Produced by: Evan Goldberg; Seth Rogen; Ben Karlin
- Starring: Joseph Gordon-Levitt; Seth Rogen; Anna Kendrick; Bryce Dallas Howard; Anjelica Huston
- Cinematography: Terry Stacey
- Edited by: Zene Baker
- Music by: Michael Giacchino
- Production companies: Mandate Pictures; Point Grey Pictures
- Distributed by: Summit Entertainment (United States); Lionsgate (International)
- Release dates: September 12, 2011 (TIFF); September 30, 2011 (United States)
- Running time: 100 minutes
- Country: United States
- Language: English
- Budget: $8 million
- Box office: $41.1 million

50/50 is a 2011 American drama film directed by Jonathan Levine, written by Will Reiser, and starring Joseph Gordon-Levitt, Seth Rogen, Anna Kendrick, Bryce Dallas Howard, and Anjelica Huston. The film is loosely inspired by Reiser's own experience with cancer, with Gordon-Levitt’s character Adam based on Reiser himself. It was filmed from February to March 2010.

50/50 was released on September 30, 2011, and grossed $41 million. It received positive reviews, with particular praise for Gordon-Levitt and Rogen's performances and Reiser's screenplay. At the Golden Globe Awards, the film was nominated for the Best Motion Picture - Musical or Comedy, as well as a Best Actor nomination for Gordon-Levitt.

== Plot ==
Mild-mannered Adam Lerner is a 27-year-old public radio journalist in Seattle. His loyal but immature best friend Kyle disapproves of his girlfriend Rachael, an artist. After experiencing severe pains in his back, Adam is diagnosed with schwannoma neurofibrosarcoma, a cancerous tumor in his spine, and must undergo chemotherapy.

Searching on the Internet, Adam sees that the survival rate for his diagnosis is 50/50. After he reveals this to his emotional mother Diane, who is already nursing her Alzheimer's-stricken husband Richard, she offers to care for him. Adam declines, as Rachael has already promised to do so.

At one of his treatments, Adam meets Mitch and Alan, two older cancer patients also undergoing chemo, and they become friends, bonding through cannabis-laced macaroons. Rachael is uncomfortable with the idea of accompanying him during his treatments and is often late picking him up. She also gets Adam a retired racing greyhound named Skeletor as a pet.

Throughout Adam's struggle, Kyle attempts to keep up his morale, helping Adam shave his head and using his friend's illness to pick up women. While on a date, Kyle sees Rachael kissing another man at a gallery, so later forces her to confess her infidelity to Adam, who breaks up with her. He follows Kyle's suggestion, and they use his illness to pick up two women at a bar.

Meanwhile, Adam is being treated by a young, inexperienced therapist, Katherine McKay, a Ph.D. candidate doing the clinical aspect of her thesis at the hospital. While their relationship and sessions begin unevenly, he slowly opens up to her. After she drives him home following a chemo session, they develop a rapport, blurring their professional and personal relationship. She helps Adam understand his mother's situation: loved ones can also feel stress like the patient, which allows Adam to repair the rift between him and his mother.

When Mitch dies, Adam's mortality hits him, causing him to lash out at Katherine verbally. Shortly after, he is informed that the chemo has not worked, so he needs to undergo a risky surgery. The night before the operation, Adam argues with an intoxicated Kyle, demanding that he let him drive his car even though he has never learned and has no driver's license.

After a near miss, Adam breaks down and accuses Kyle of being more concerned with using the cancer for his own gain than taking his condition seriously. Adam then calls Katherine and tells her he wishes she was his girlfriend, but he also says he is tired of being sick and wants his cancer to be over.

That night, when dropping off Kyle, Adam finds the book Facing Cancer Together from their trip to a bookstore, where Kyle had also picked up a shop clerk. The book is filled with notes, highlighted paragraphs, and turned-down pages. He realizes that Kyle sincerely cares about him and has earnestly tried to help him since his diagnosis, and has merely continued to treat Adam like he always had.

The next day, Kyle drops Adam off at the hospital, where Adam embraces him for being a good friend and apologizes for the previous night. After saying his tearful farewells to his family, he undergoes surgery. Katherine goes to the waiting room and inadvertently meets Adam's parents and Kyle during the wait.

After the surgery, they are told that although the bone degradation was worse than they believed, the surgeons removed the tumor successfully, and Adam will recover. Sometime later, he prepares for a date with Katherine while Kyle encourages him and bandages the incision on his back. After Kyle leaves, Katherine asks, "Now what?" and Adam smiles, finally cancer-free.

== Cast ==
- Joseph Gordon-Levitt as Adam Lerner
- Seth Rogen as Kyle Hirons, Adam's best friend
- Anna Kendrick as Katherine McKay
- Bryce Dallas Howard as Rachael, Adam's girlfriend
- Anjelica Huston as Diane Lerner, Adam's mother
- Serge Houde as Richard Lerner, Adam's father
- Andrew Airlie as Dr. Ross
- Matt Frewer as Mitch Barnett
- Philip Baker Hall as Alan Lombardo
- Donna Yamamoto as Dr. Walderson
- Sugar Lyn Beard as Susan
- Yee Jee Tso as Dr. Lee
- Sarah Smyth as Jenny
- Peter Kelamis as Phil
- Jessica Parker Kennedy as Jackie
- Daniel Bacon as Dr. Phillips
- P. Lynn Johnson as Bernie
- Laura Bertram as Claire
- Matty Finochio as Ted
- Luisa D'Oliveira as Agabelle Loogenburgen
- Veena Sood as Nurse Stewart
- Marie Avgeropoulos as Allison
- Ryan W. Smith as Joe
- Lauren A. Miller as Bodie

== Production ==
=== Development ===
The screenplay is loosely based on the experience of screenwriter Will Reiser, friend of the film's co-lead, Seth Rogen. Reiser is also close with Evan Goldberg of Da Ali G Show. The title of Reiser's script was I'm with Cancer, but executives at Summit Entertainment changed the title of the film so as not to alienate audiences from the film's subject matter. The film was later renamed Live with It and then 50/50.

James McAvoy was going to play the lead role before he left the film for personal reasons, as he was afraid of missing the birth of his first child, and was replaced by Joseph Gordon-Levitt.

=== Filming ===
Principal photography took place in Vancouver over a five-week period, beginning in March 2010.

The head-shaving scene in the film was featured on the movie posters and commercials. At the 50/50 premiere in New York, Gordon-Levitt said, "We only had one take because you can't shave your head twice." Rogen recalled, "It was the first day of filming, and we improvised the whole thing, which is not wise when it's something you have one take for, but it turned out funny."

== Reception ==
=== Critical response ===
On the review aggregator website Rotten Tomatoes, 93% of 200 critics' reviews are positive, with an average rating of 7.7/10. The website's consensus reads: "A good-hearted film about a difficult topic, 50/50 maneuvers between jokes and drama with surprising finesse." Metacritic, which assigns a weighted average score, gives the film a score of 72 out of 100, based on 42 critics, indicating "generally favorable" reviews. Audiences polled by CinemaScore gave the film an average grade of "A−" on an A+ to F scale.

Sean Burns wrote in the Philadelphia Weekly that Levine "knows how to stay out of the way long enough to let a very talented cast shine, and Rogen's fundamental, unexpected decency, which can often only be expressed through shoulder-punching obscenities, grows more quietly moving as the picture wears on." Nicole Sperling of the Los Angeles Times commented, "With its union of humor and pathos, '50/50' offers audiences both a more sophisticated take on the typical Hollywood bromance, yet enough bawdy humor to lure in Rogen fans adverse to a film with cancer as its core." Cam Williams of SBS also praised the film's depiction of male friendship, describing it as counter to the "toxic masculinity inherent in so much modern filmmaking."

David Schmader, writing in The Stranger, praised "'50/50's stellar cast, from the omnipresent lead Joseph Gordon-Levitt (whose Rankin/Bass puppet face is put to beautifully nuanced use) to the all-star supporting cast: Anjelica Huston roars back to prominence with a twisty performance as Adam's barely contained mess of a mom, and Anna Kendrick's young doctoral student makes the film's rom-com aspirations not-ridiculous with her intelligent spontaneity and cute smile. But the comedy star is Seth Rogen, cast in the same role he played in screenwriter Reiser's life."

=== Accolades ===
The film was nominated for two awards at the 69th Golden Globe Awards. Gordon-Levitt received a nomination for Best Actor (Musical or Comedy) and the film itself was nominated for Best Picture (Musical or Comedy).

Seth Rogen addressed the film's lack of an Academy Award nomination in an interview with Entertainment Weekly, saying he predicted that it wouldn't be nominated, saying that he knew for a fact that "some people are appalled by the movie." He said of this, "I think it must be people who have very, very personal connections to the subject matter and just can't emotionally disconnect from their own experience. I respect that. But what we found for the most part is that people like to laugh at tragedy. It makes them feel better."

Award	Date of ceremony	Category	Recipients	Result	Ref.
AARP Movies for Grownups Awards	20 January 2012	Best Comedy	50/50	Nominated	
Aspen Filmfest	25 September 2011	Audience Favorite Feature	50/50	Won	
Awards Circuit Community Awards	2011	Best Original Screenplay	Will Reiser	Nominated	
Awards Circuit Community Awards	2011	Honorable Mentions	50/50	Nominated	
Casting Society of America Awards	29 October 2012	Outstanding Achievement in Casting - Feature - Studio or Independent Comedy	Francine Maisler	Nominated	
Critics' Choice Movie Awards	12 January 2012	Best Original Screenplay	Will Reiser	Nominated	
Dallas-Fort Worth Film Critics Association Awards	16 December 2011	Best Picture	50/50	Nominated	
Detroit Film Critics Society	16 December 2011	Best Screenplay	Will Reiser	Nominated	
Dorian Awards	16 January 2012	Unsung Film of the Year	50/50	Won	
Independent Spirit Awards	25 February 2012	Best First Screenplay	Will Reiser	Won	
Independent Spirit Awards	25 February 2012	Best Feature	50/50	Nominated	
Independent Spirit Awards	25 February 2012	Best Supporting Female	Anjelica Huston	Nominated	
Georgia Film Critics Association	17 January 2012	Best Original Screenplay	Will Reiser	Nominated	
Gold Derby Awards	25 February 2012	Original Screenplay	Will Reiser	Nominated	
Golden Globe Awards	15 January 2012	Best Performance by an Actor in a Motion Picture - Comedy or Musical	Joseph Gordon-Levitt	Nominated	
Golden Globe Awards	15 January 2012	Best Motion Picture - Comedy or Musical	50/50	Nominated	
Golden Schmoes Awards	24 February 2012	Best Screenplay of the Year	Will Reiser	Won	
Golden Schmoes Awards	24 February 2012	Most Underrated Movie of the Year	50/50	Nominated	
Golden Schmoes Awards	24 February 2012	Best Comedy of the Year	50/50	Nominated	
Golden Schmoes Awards	24 February 2012	Best Actor of the Year	Joseph Gordon-Levitt	Nominated	
Golden Trailer Awards	31 May 2012	Best Graphics in a TV Spot	50/50	Nominated	
Hollywood Film Awards	24 October 2011	Breakthrough Actor Award	Joseph Gordon-Levitt	Won	
Houston Film Critics Society	14 December 2011	Best Screenplay	Will Reiser	Nominated	
IGN Best of 2011	12 January 2012	Best Movie Actor	Joseph Gordon-Levitt	Nominated	
IGN Best of 2011	12 January 2012	Best Comedy Movie	50/50	Nominated	
Las Vegas Film Critics Society Awards	17 December 2011	Best Picture	50/50	7th place	
MTV Movie Awards	3 June 2012	Best Male Performance	Joseph Gordon-Levitt	Nominated	
National Board of Review	1 December 2011	Best Original Screenplay	Will Reiser	Won	
National Board of Review	1 December 2011	Top Ten Independent Films	50/50	Won	
Online Film Critics Society	2 January 2012	Best First Screenplay	Will Reiser	Nominated	
San Diego Film Critics Society	14 December 2011	Best Original Screenplay	Will Reiser	Nominated	
St. Louis Gateway Film Critics Association	19 December 2011	Best Original Screenplay	Will Reiser	Runner-up	
Stockholm International Film Festival	20 November 2011	Audience Award	50/50	Won	
Torino Film Festival	3 December 2011	Best Feature Film	50/50	Nominated	
Torino Film Festival	3 December 2011	Achille Valdata Audience Award	50/50	Won	
Utah Film Critics Association Awards	21 December 2011	Best Actor	Joseph Gordon-Levitt	Won	
Utah Film Critics Association Awards	21 December 2011	Best Original Screenplay	Will Reiser	Won	
Washington DC Area Film Critics Association	5 December 2011	Best Original Screenplay	Will Reiser	Won	
Women Film Critics Circle Awards	19 December 2011	Best Male Images in a Movie	50/50	Nominated	
Writers Guild of America Awards	19 February 2012	Best Original Screenplay	Will Reiser	Nominated	

=== Top ten lists ===
The film was included in the following top ten lists for the best films of 2011:

Publication	Rank
The Arizona Republic	3
Boxoffice	7
MTV	8
Daily News	9
/Film	5
Tampa Bay Times	5
USA Today	N/A

== Home media ==
50/50 was released on DVD and Blu-ray Disc in North America on January 24, 2012. Both releases include commentary, deleted scenes, and behind-the-scenes videos.

== Songs ==
No official soundtrack was released; however, a number of pop songs appear in the film, such as:

- "High and Dry" – Radiohead
- "The Other Side of Mt. Heart Attack" – Liars
- "Bricks or Coconuts" – Jacuzzi Boys
- "Simplicity" – Harmony & Balance
- "New Country" – The Walkmen
- "To Love Somebody" – Bee Gees
- "Work to Do" – The Aggrolites
- "Turn It Down" – Sideway Runners
- "Stay the Same" – autoKratz
- "Soul Connection" – The Diplomats of Solid Sound
- "Too Late for Dancing" – Shapes and Sizes
- "Days Gone Down (Still Got the Light in Your Eyes)" – Gerry Rafferty
- "Crying" – Roy Orbison
- "Yellow Ledbetter" – Pearl Jam
