= 2011 New York Film Critics Circle Awards =

77th New York Film Critics Circle Awards

77th NYFCC Awards

January 9, 2012

Best Picture:
The Artist

The 77th New York Film Critics Circle Awards, honoring the best in film for 2011, were announced on 29 November 2011 and presented on 9 January 2012.

== Winners ==
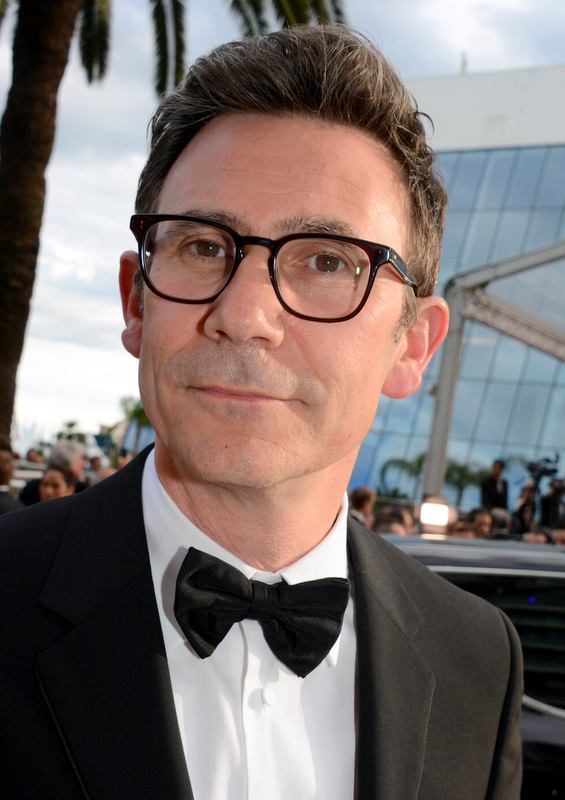
Michel Hazanavicius, Best Director winner

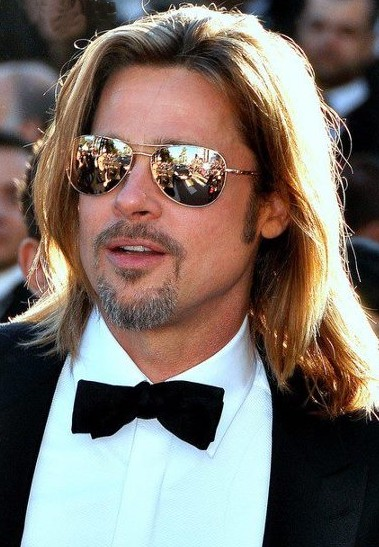
Brad Pitt, Best Actor winner

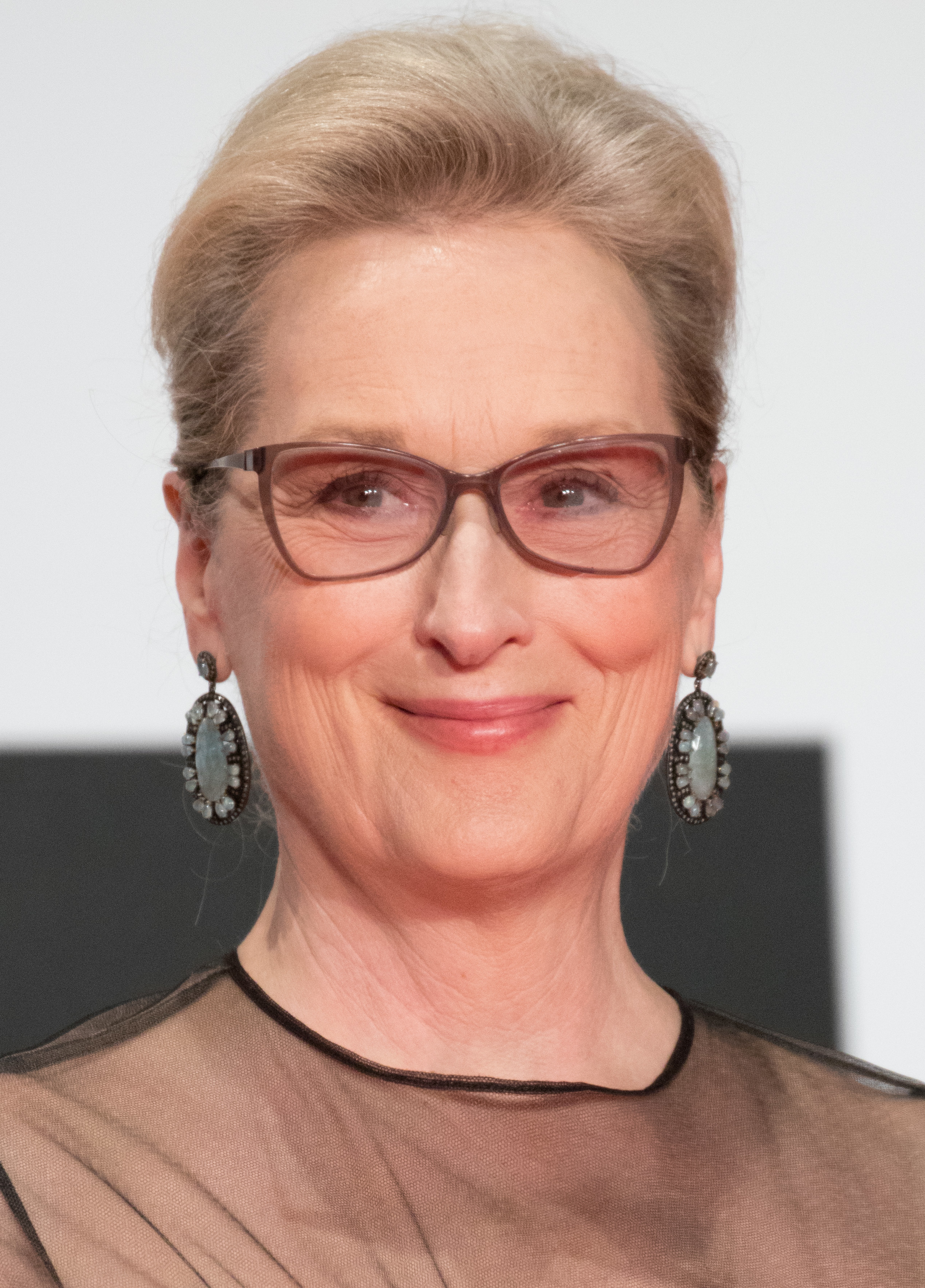
Meryl Streep, Best Actress winner

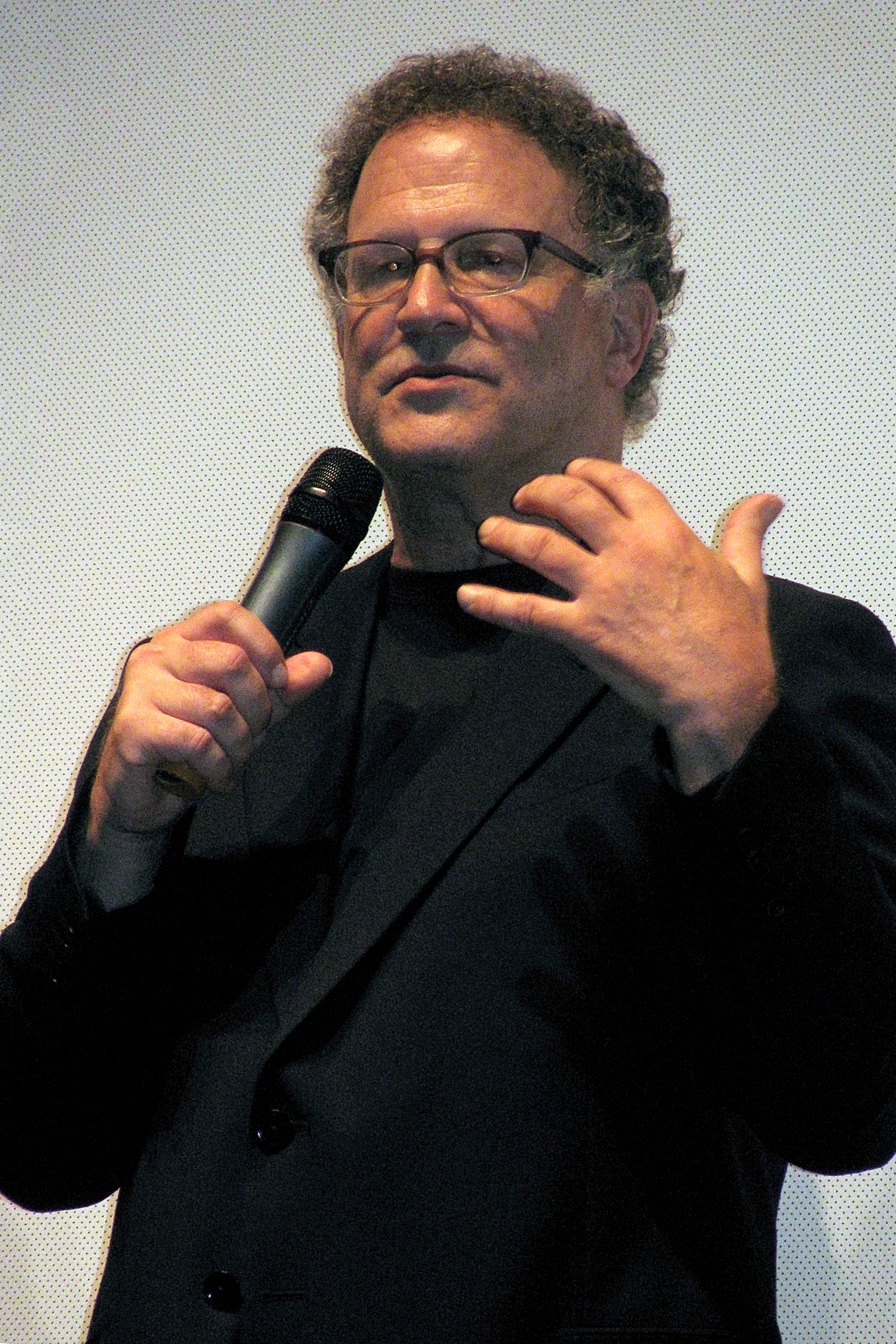
Albert Brooks, Best Supporting Actor winner

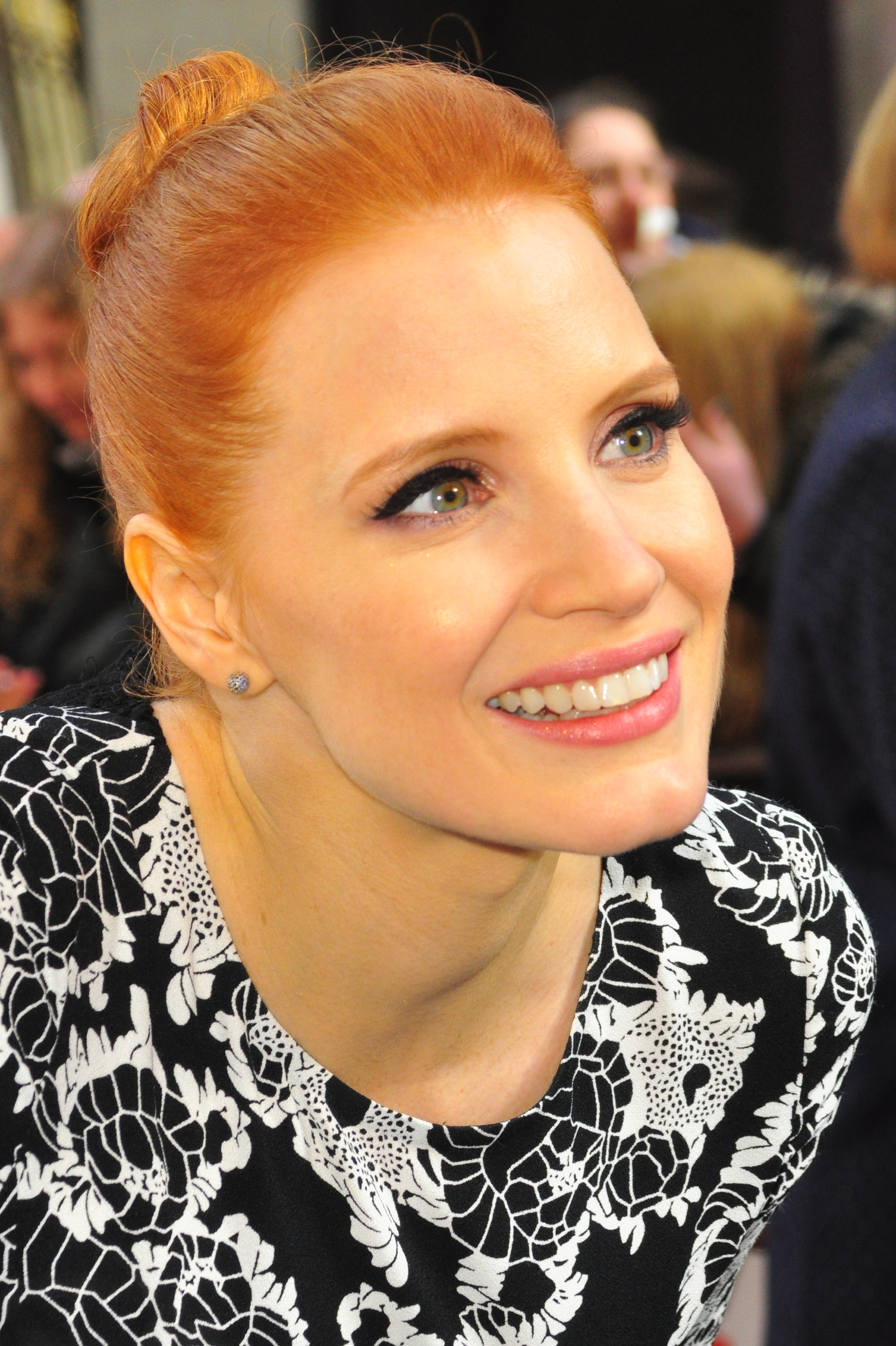
Jessica Chastain, Best Supporting Actress winner

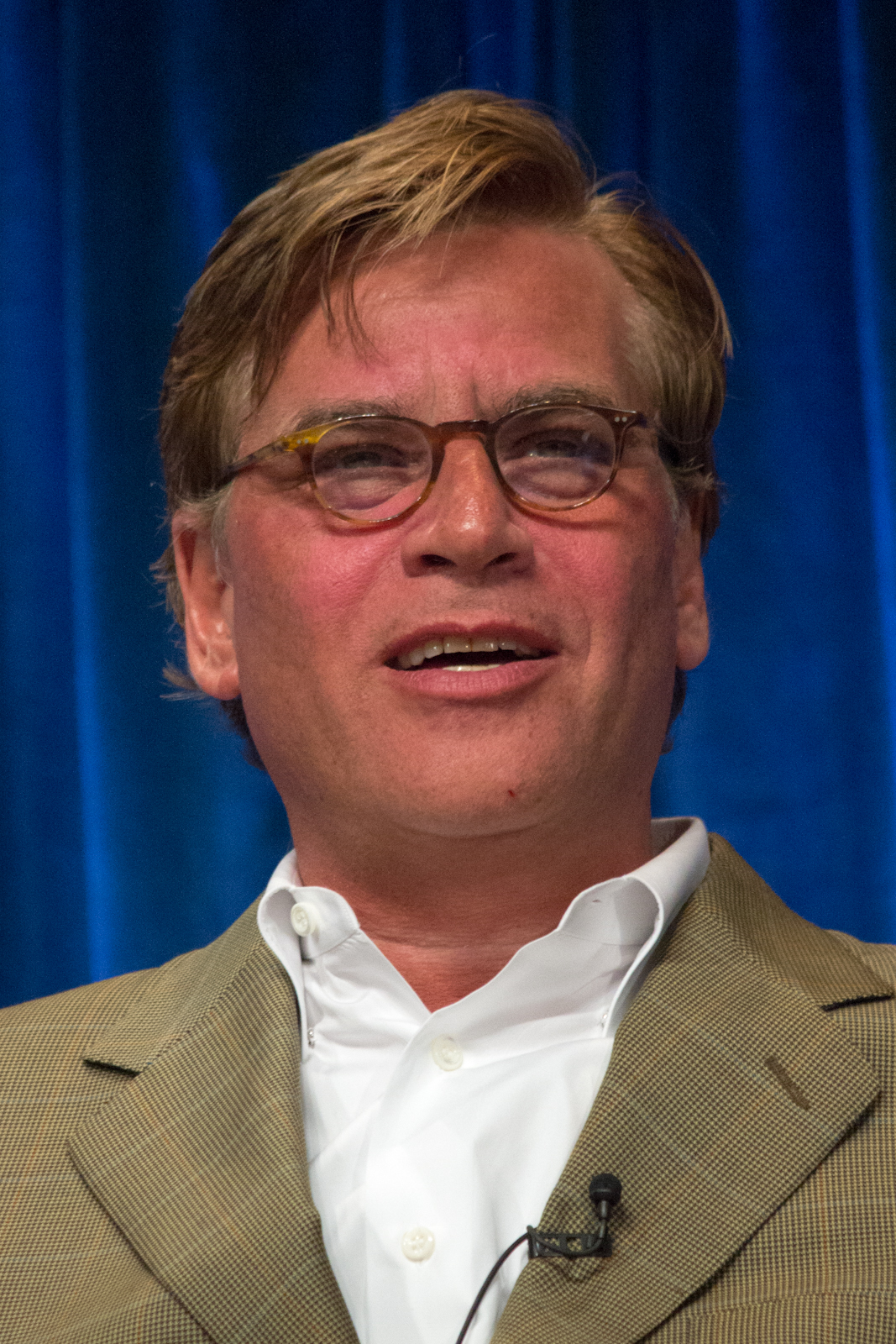
Aaron Sorkin, Best Screenplay co-winner

- Best Film:
  - The Artist
  - Runners-up: Melancholia and Hugo
- Best Director:
  - Michel Hazanavicius – The Artist
  - Runners-up: Martin Scorsese – Hugo and Lars von Trier – Melancholia
- Best Actor:
  - Brad Pitt – Moneyball and The Tree of Life
  - Runners-up: Michael Fassbender – Shame and Jean Dujardin – The Artist
- Best Actress:
  - Meryl Streep – The Iron Lady
  - Runners-up: Michelle Williams – My Week with Marilyn and Kirsten Dunst – Melancholia
- Best Supporting Actor:
  - Albert Brooks – Drive
  - Runners-up: Christopher Plummer – Beginners and Viggo Mortensen – A Dangerous Method
- Best Supporting Actress:
  - Jessica Chastain – The Help, Take Shelter, and The Tree of Life
  - Runners-up: Carey Mulligan – Shame and Vanessa Redgrave – Coriolanus
- Best Screenplay:
  - Aaron Sorkin and Steven Zaillian – Moneyball
- Best Cinematography:
  - Emmanuel Lubezki – The Tree of Life
- Best Foreign Language Film:
  - A Separation (Jodaeiye Nader az Simin) • Iran
  - Runner-up: Incendies • Canada
- Best Non-Fiction Film:
  - Cave of Forgotten Dreams
- Best First Film:
  - J. C. Chandor – Margin Call
- Special Award:
  - Raúl Ruiz
