= Online Film Critics Society Awards 2011 =

15th Online Film Critics Society Awards

15th Online Film Critics Society Awards

January 2, 2012

Best Picture:
The Tree of Life

The 15th Online Film Critics Society Awards, honoring the best in film for 2011, were announced on 2 January 2012.

== Winners and nominees ==
=== Best Picture ===
The Tree of Life

- The Artist
- The Descendants
- Drive
- Hugo

=== Best Director ===
Terrence Malick – The Tree of Life

- Michel Hazanavicius – The Artist
- Martin Scorsese – Hugo
- Lars von Trier – Melancholia
- Nicolas Winding Refn – Drive

=== Best Actor ===
Michael Fassbender – Shame

- George Clooney – The Descendants
- Jean Dujardin – The Artist
- Gary Oldman – Tinker Tailor Soldier Spy
- Michael Shannon – Take Shelter

=== Best Actress ===
Tilda Swinton – We Need to Talk About Kevin

- Kirsten Dunst – Melancholia
- Elizabeth Olsen – Martha Marcy May Marlene
- Meryl Streep – The Iron Lady
- Michelle Williams – My Week with Marilyn

=== Best Supporting Actor ===
Christopher Plummer – Beginners

- Albert Brooks – Drive
- John Hawkes – Martha Marcy May Marlene
- Nick Nolte – Warrior
- Brad Pitt – The Tree of Life

=== Best Supporting Actress ===
Jessica Chastain – The Tree of Life

- Melissa McCarthy – Bridesmaids
- Janet McTeer – Albert Nobbs
- Carey Mulligan – Shame
- Shailene Woodley – The Descendants

=== Best Original Screenplay ===
Midnight in Paris – Woody Allen

- Martha Marcy May Marlene – Sean Durkin
- A Separation – Asghar Farhadi
- The Tree of Life – Terrence Malick
- Win Win – Tom McCarthy

=== Best Adapted Screenplay ===
Tinker Tailor Soldier Spy – Bridget O'Connor & Peter Straughan

- The Descendants – Nat Faxon, Jim Rash & Alexander Payne
- Drive – Hossein Amini
- Moneyball – Steven Zaillian & Aaron Sorkin
- We Need to Talk About Kevin – Lynne Ramsay & Rory Stewart Kinnear

=== Best Foreign Language Film ===
A Separation

- 13 Assassins
- Certified Copy
- The Skin I Live In
- Uncle Boonmee Who Can Recall His Past Lives

=== Best Documentary ===
Cave of Forgotten Dreams

- The Interrupters
- Into the Abyss
- Project Nim
- Tabloid

=== Best Animated Feature ===
Rango

- The Adventures of Tintin: The Secret of the Unicorn
- Arthur Christmas
- Kung Fu Panda 2
- Winnie the Pooh

=== Best Cinematography ===
The Tree of Life – Emmanuel Lubezki

- The Artist – Guillaume Schiffman
- Drive – Newton Thomas Sigel
- Hugo – Robert Richardson
- Melancholia – Manuel Alberto Claro

=== Best Editing ===
The Tree of Life – Hank Corwin, Jay Rabinowitz, Daniel Rezende, Billy Weber & Mark Yoshikawa

- Drive – Matthew Newman
- Martha Marcy May Marlene – Zachary Stuart-Pontier
- Tinker Tailor Soldier Spy – Dino Jonsäter
- We Need to Talk About Kevin – Joe Bini

=== Special awards ===
- To Jessica Chastain, the breakout performer of the year
- To Martin Scorsese in honor of his work and dedication to the pursuit of film preservation
