= Bridesmaids (2011 film) =

American comedy film by Paul Feig

- Theatrical release poster
- Directed by: Paul Feig
- Written by: Annie Mumolo; Kristen Wiig
- Produced by: Judd Apatow; Barry Mendel; Clayton Townsend
- Starring: Kristen Wiig; Maya Rudolph; Rose Byrne; Wendi McLendon-Covey; Ellie Kemper; Melissa McCarthy; Chris O'Dowd
- Cinematography: Robert Yeoman
- Edited by: William Kerr; Mike Sale
- Music by: Michael Andrews
- Production companies: Relativity Media; Apatow Productions
- Distributed by: Universal Pictures
- Release dates: April 28, 2011 (Westwood premiere); May 13, 2011 (United States)
- Running time: 125 minutes
- Country: United States
- Language: English
- Budget: $32.5 million
- Box office: $290 million

Bridesmaids is a 2011 American comedy film directed by Paul Feig from a screenplay by Annie Mumolo and Kristen Wiig. It stars Wiig as a woman who experiences a series of misfortunes after being asked to serve as maid of honor for her best friend, played by Maya Rudolph. The cast also features Rose Byrne, Wendi McLendon-Covey, Ellie Kemper, Melissa McCarthy, and Chris O'Dowd.

Actresses Mumolo and Wiig wrote the screenplay after the latter was cast in Judd Apatow's comedy Knocked Up (2007). Bridesmaids premiered in Westwood, Los Angeles on April 28, 2011, and was theatrically released in the United States on May 13, 2011, by Universal Pictures. It grossed $306.5 million worldwide on a $32.5 million budget, and surpassed Knocked Up to become the top-grossing Apatow Productions film to date. At the 84th Academy Awards, McCarthy was nominated for Best Supporting Actress, and Wiig and Mumolo for Best Original Screenplay.

Bridesmaids has served as a touchstone for discussion about women in comedy. Several publications have ranked it among the best comedy films of the 21st century.

== Plot ==
Annie Walker is a single, underachieving woman living in Milwaukee. Following the Great Recession, her bakery, Cake Baby, went out of business. She now works a stressful, underpaid job at a jewelry store and shares an apartment with obnoxious roommates. She regularly has casual sex with the wealthy, self-absorbed Ted, though she desires a more committed relationship with him. The only positive presence in Annie's life is her lifelong best friend, Lillian.

Lillian becomes engaged to her boyfriend Doug and asks Annie to be her maid of honor. At the engagement party, Annie meets Lillian's other bridesmaids — Lillian's long-married cousin Rita; Lillian's naive, newlywed coworker Becca; Doug's foul-mouthed but friendly sister Megan; and Helen Harris, the wealthy and beautiful but snobbish wife of Doug's boss. Annie and Helen are instantly jealous of each other's friendships with Lillian and become increasingly competitive for her attention.

On the way home from the engagement party, Annie is pulled over by police officer Nathan Rhodes due to her erratic driving. She completes a sobriety test, which she passes; however, she is ticketed for having broken brake lights. The pair get talking and Rhodes realizes that Annie was the owner of Cake Baby, of which he was a regular customer. Officer Rhodes agrees to rescind Annie's ticket on the condition that she gets her lights fixed.

Annie takes Lillian and her bridesmaids for lunch at a Brazilian restaurant and then takes them to a high-end bridal boutique. With the exception of Helen, who did not eat at the restaurant, the women are all stricken with food poisoning while they are trying on dresses. As Rita vomits into a toilet, Becca vomits on Rita and Megan defecates into a bathroom sink. While wearing an haute couture dress, Lillian tries to rush through traffic to reach another bathroom; however, she succumbs to diarrhea, defecating in the street.

Annie's subsequent suggestion for a simple bachelorette party at Lillian's parents' lake house is overruled in favor of a Las Vegas trip planned by Helen. On the plane, Annie accepts a sedative and liquor from Helen to alleviate her fear of flying, but becomes intoxicated and belligerent toward airline staff. She then starts hallucinating and suffers a paranoid breakdown, culminating in her being apprehended by an air marshal. The plane makes an emergency landing, and the party takes a bus home. Lillian decides that Helen should take over the planning of the bridal shower and wedding.

Meanwhile, Annie grows closer to Rhodes. He repeatedly encourages her to open a new bakery despite her apprehension. Following a romantic night together, she abruptly leaves when Rhodes surprises her with baking supplies the next morning.

After being fired from her job over a profanity-laden argument with a teenage customer and evicted by her roommates, Annie moves in with her mother. Annie travels to Helen's home in Chicago for Lillian's Parisian-themed bridal shower—an idea of Annie's that Helen had previously rejected. When Helen upstages Annie's heartfelt gift by surprising Lillian with a trip to Paris, Annie flies into a profane tirade, loudly berating Lillian and Helen and destroying the decorations. The subsequent argument between Annie and Lillian ends with Annie storming out of the bridal shower and Lillian disinviting her from the wedding.

While driving home, Annie's still-broken lights lead to a car accident. The responding officer is Rhodes, who admonishes her for not taking responsibility for herself. Ted arrives shortly afterward, offering Annie a ride. When he asks her to perform fellatio on him as he drives, she demands to be let out of the car and walks home.

Megan visits Annie, motivating her to take control of her life. Annie fixes her car, takes up baking again, and tries to reconcile with Rhodes, though he ignores her. On the day of the wedding, Helen comes to Annie, begging for help to find a missing Lillian. During their search, Helen tearfully confesses that most people only hang out with her for her event-planning skills, she does not have any true friends, and she feels unsatisfied in her marriage.

With some begrudging help from Nathan, Annie and Helen find Lillian in her apartment, where she tearfully admits to Annie that she is overwhelmed by Helen's extravagant wedding planning and is afraid of leaving her life in Milwaukee. The two reconcile, and Annie resumes her role as maid of honor. After the wedding, Annie and Helen agree to hang out together, officially becoming friends. Rhodes then arrives unexpectedly. Annie and Rhodes kiss before riding away in his police car.

== Cast ==
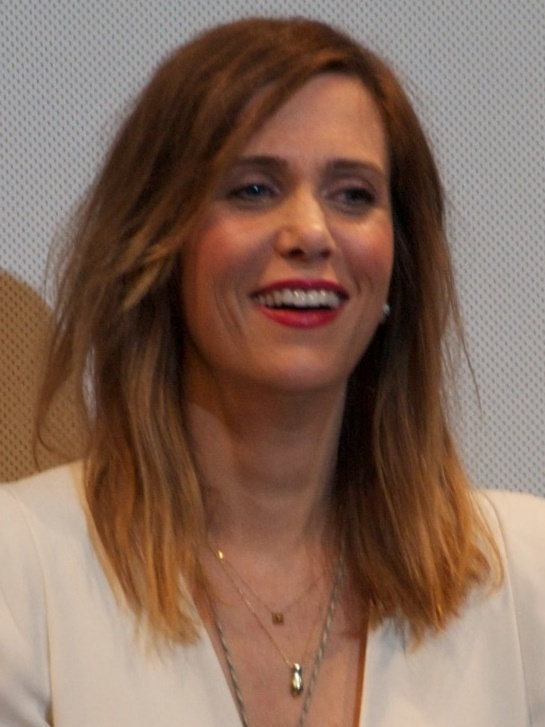
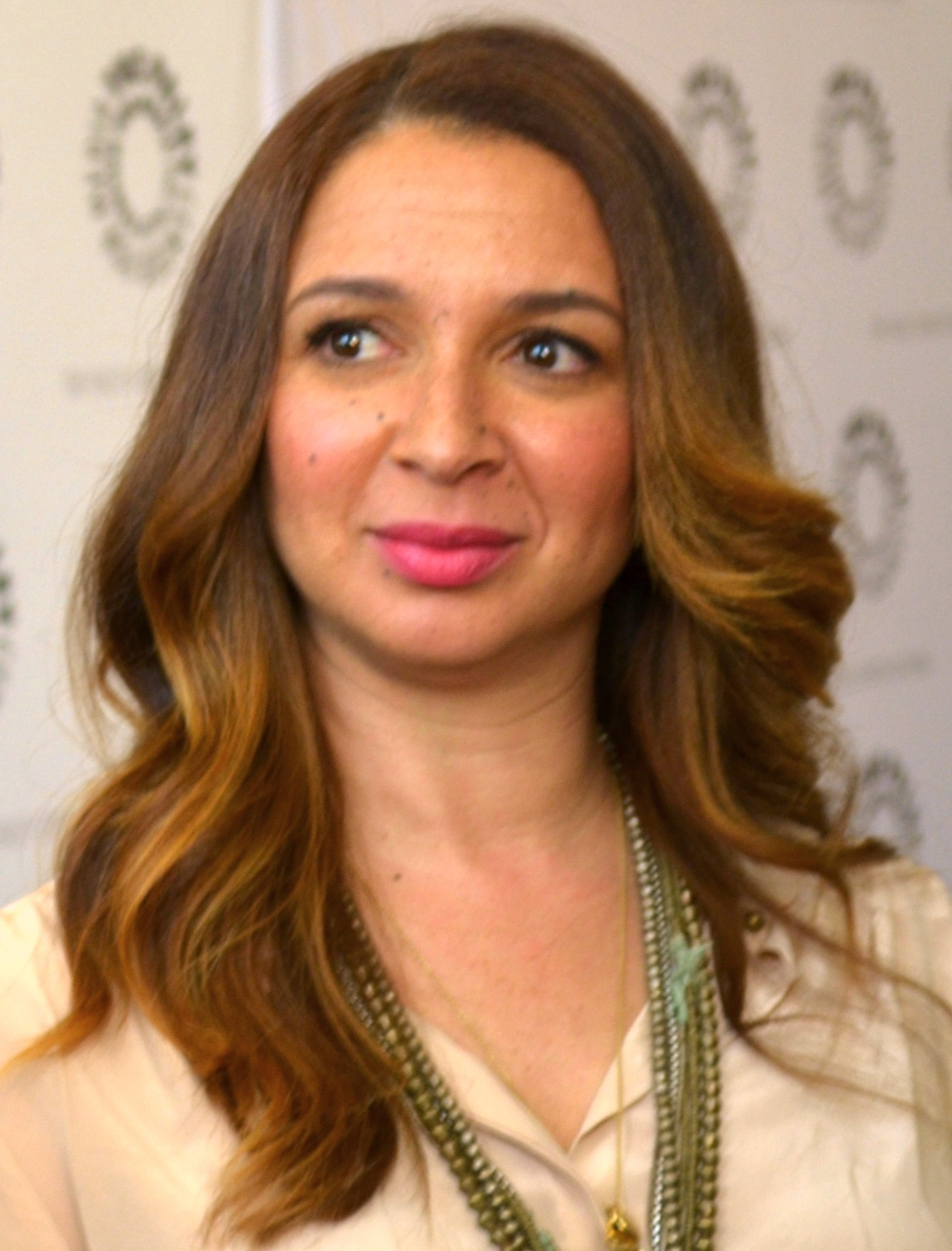
Saturday Night Live alumnae Kristen Wiig and Maya Rudolph star in the film.
- Kristen Wiig as Annie Walker
- Maya Rudolph as Lillian Donovan
- Rose Byrne as Helen Harris III
- Melissa McCarthy as Megan Price
- Wendi McLendon-Covey as Rita
- Ellie Kemper as Becca
- Chris O'Dowd as Officer Nathan Rhodes
- Jill Clayburgh as Judy Walker
- Matt Lucas as Gil
- Rebel Wilson as Brynn
- Michael Hitchcock as Don Cholodecki
- Tim Heidecker as Douglas "Doug/Dougie" Price
- Ben Falcone as Air Marshal Jon
- Dana Powell as Flight Attendant Claire
- Mitch Silpa as Flight Attendant Steve
- Terry Crews as Rodney
- Jillian Bell as Girl at Shower
- Franklyn Ajaye as Lillian's father
- Matt Bennett as Helen's Stepson
- Greg Tuculescu as Kevin
- Jon Hamm as Ted
- Richard Riehle as Bill Cozbi

Major uncredited appearances include: Jon Hamm as Ted, Annie's sex buddy; Grammy Award-winning accordionist, pianist, and composer Nick Ariondo as the accordion player; former SNL cast members Melanie Hutsell and Nancy Carell as two women on the tennis court, and Emmy, Drama Desk and Grammy Award winner Pat Carroll as the old woman in the car.

The film's co-writers, Wiig and Annie Mumolo, appear together when Mumolo plays the nervous woman on the plane, while director Paul Feig appears uncredited as a wedding guest.

Paul Rudd was to appear as a man whom Annie goes on a blind date with, but the scene was cut from the final film.

Mia Rose Frampton appears briefly as a thirteen-year-old girl who argues with Annie in the jewelry store; the film's Blu-ray release includes an extended, ten-minute scene of improvised dialogue between the two.

Wilson Phillips appear as themselves late in the film when they perform their song "Hold On".

== Production ==
=== Writing ===
It was only after the movie was completed that anyone said this had any significance. We didn't think it was any different than something like The House Bunny or Baby Mama. So we didn't think we were breaking any new ground. We just thought it was a fun thing to do.

— Producer Judd Apatow

The script, originally titled Maid of Honor, was written by actress and screenwriter Annie Mumolo and Kristen Wiig. Friends for years, they met at The Groundlings, a Los Angeles-based improvisational comedy troupe where they wrote sketches with one another, in the early 2000s. The basic premise for the film originated in 2006, shortly after Wiig was cast in the supporting role of a passive-aggressive cable television executive in producer Judd Apatow's comedy film Knocked Up (2007). Recognizing her comedic talent, Apatow asked Wiig if she had any ideas for a screenplay herself – a practice which had previously led to Steve Carell's idea for The 40-Year-Old Virgin (2005) – and she and Mumolo soon came up with Bridesmaids. Over the following years, writing commenced, with Wiig working on Saturday Night Live in New York City and Mumolo grinding out the script in Los Angeles. The two would meet on weekends and conduct semi-regular table reads of drafts for Apatow to get his suggestions and notes. Filmmaker Paul Feig came across Wiig and Mumolo's script in 2007. When Feig signed on as director and the script got the greenlight for production in 2010, Feig said, "There was an edict from Hollywood where they were all going, 'Okay this is a movie starring a bunch of women. If this works, we'll greenlight more, and if it doesn't, we won't...I was really sweating because if this didn't work then I'm basically the man who killed movies for women for eternity. So, thank God it worked."

=== Casting and filming ===
Several actresses, including Rebel Wilson and Busy Philipps (the latter of whom had worked with Apatow and Feig on their comedy-drama television series Freaks and Geeks), auditioned for the role of Megan. Wilson, who improvised for Apatow and Feig for an hour during her audition, impressed them so much that she was later cast in the smaller role of Brynn. It marked her first appearance in an American production, and she allegedly received $3,500, all of which went toward paying fees to join the Screen Actors Guild. Mindy Kaling read for the role of Lillian, eventually losing to Wiig's Saturday Night Live colleague Maya Rudolph. Rose Byrne initially also auditioned for Lillian, but later took the opportunity to read Helen. Byrne was eventually chosen as the nemesis because she wasn't a comedian as Feig feared the character would be "coming out to be too arch if we had a funny woman doing it." Greta Gerwig and Judy Greer also auditioned for unspecified roles.

Bridesmaids was budgeted at $32.5 million. Although primarily set in Milwaukee and Chicago, principal photography took place in Los Angeles. Production designer Jefferson Sage, who has worked with Apatow and Paul Feig since their Freaks and Geeks days, noted that the first fact that appealed to him about the project "was that you had these two disparate worlds: There was Annie's world in Milwaukee, and then there was Helen's world in Chicago. It immediately drew this dichotomy between the rivalry that developed between them." However, Sage acknowledged that it was a challenge to find "architecture that would give us those Midwestern worlds. Chicago is a beautiful, distinctive city architecturally, and restricted views of downtown L.A. feel like Chicago." The production decided to use the Los Angeles County Arboretum and Botanic Garden as the location for Lillian and Dougie's wedding. Additional scenes where Annie meets Officer Rhodes on the highways between Milwaukee and Chicago were filmed in Oxnard, California, which Sage described as a "broad, flat, green area away from mountains."

== Reception ==
=== Critical response ===
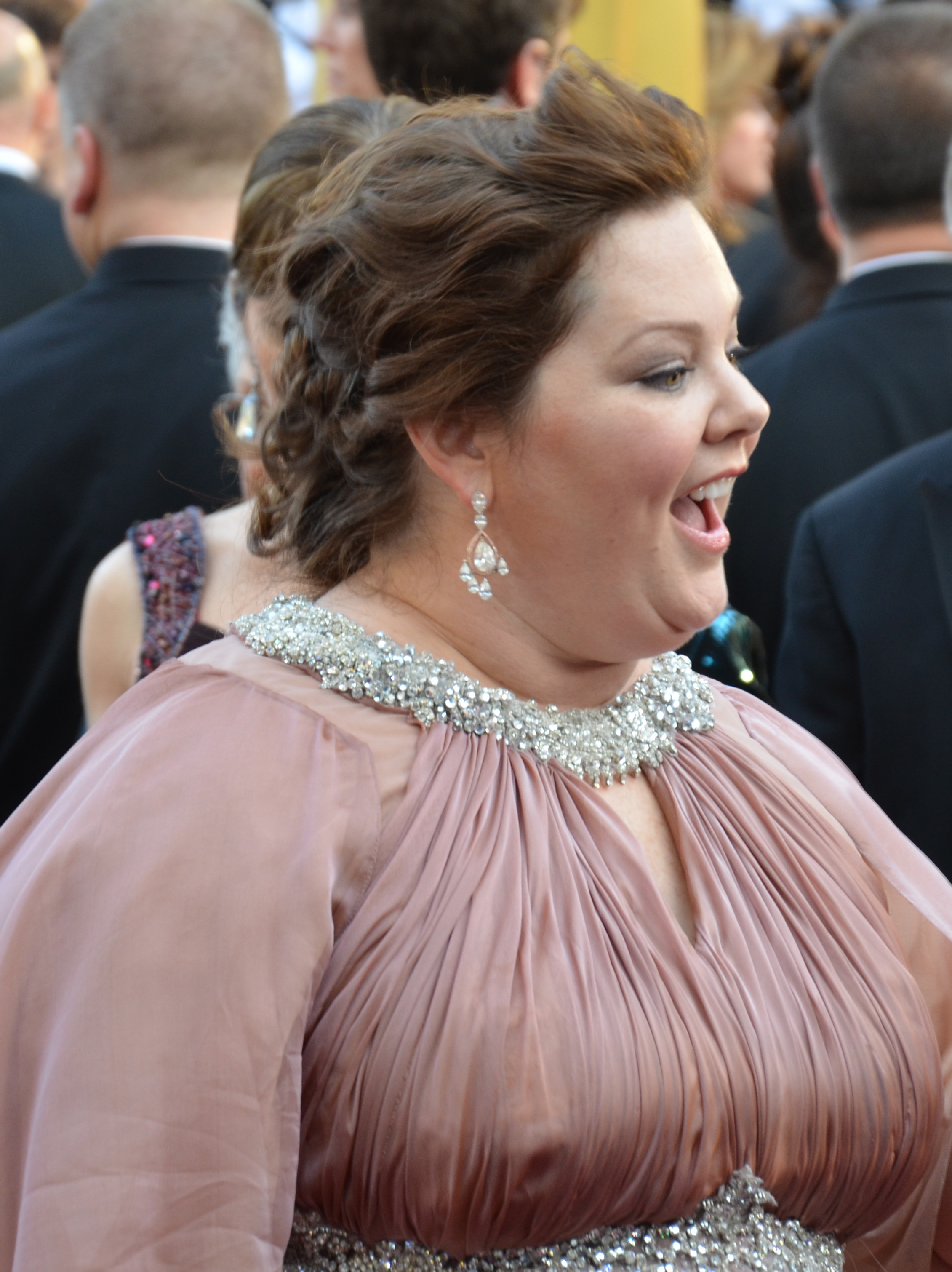
Melissa McCarthy at the 84th Academy Awards, where she was nominated for Best Supporting Actress.

Bridesmaids received positive reviews upon its release, with praise towards Wiig and Mumolo's screenplay and McCarthy's performance. The review aggregator website Rotten Tomatoes reports that 89% of critics gave the film a positive review based on 294 reviews, with an average score of 7.60/10. The site's critical consensus states: "A marriage of genuine characters, gross out gags, and pathos, Bridesmaids is a female-driven comedy that refuses to be boxed in as Kristen Wiig emerges as a real star." Metacritic gives the film a score of 75 out of 100 based on reviews from 39 critics, indicating "generally favorable" reviews. Audiences polled by CinemaScore gave the film an average grade of "B+" on an A+ to F scale.

Roger Ebert gave the film 3.5 stars of out 4, and said that Bridesmaids "seems to be a more or less deliberate attempt to cross the Chick Flick with the Raunch Comedy. It definitely proves that women are the equal of men in vulgarity, sexual frankness, lust, vulnerability, overdrinking and insecurity ... Love him or not, Judd Apatow is consistently involved with movies that connect with audiences." Tamara Winfrey-Harris noted in Ms. that, to her "enduring surprise", despite the involvement of Apatow, and themes that had been "done and done and done", the film passed the Bechdel test of female-driven storylines.

Critic Owen Gleiberman of Entertainment Weekly pointed out the significance of Bridesmaids' success as follows: "So far, the message that Hollywood seems to have taken from the incredible success of Bridesmaids is a predictably reductive one, something along the lines of: Hey, look! Raunchy comedies for women with awesome grossout scenes in the middle of them can be big box office too!! The message that Hollywood should be taking is: A comedy that's raunchy and fearless, and also brilliantly written and shrewdly honest about what's really going on in women's lives, may actually connect with the fabled non-teenage audience (remember them?)."

Many critics, like Mary Elizabeth Williams of Salon (who called Bridesmaids the "first black president of female-driven comedies") labeled the film as "a breakthrough for female-centered comedy, and feminist to boot." It was also credited with proving that "women could pull off a good fart joke as well as the next guy, and did what seemed like the impossible: leading an all-female cast to blockbuster success." O'Dowd's performance also won positive reviews, despite his limited screentime.

Despite the majority of praise, the film was not without its detractors. Abby Koenig of The Houston Press enjoyed Kristen Wiig's comedic talents, but disliked the frequency of "raunchy jokes" throughout the film, writing that "we need more funny females getting the spotlight. However, we also need women that can crack you up without making you watch them have diarrhea". Karina Longworth of The Village Voice criticised the inconsistency of the film's tone, stating that certain scenes have "a kind of dumb crassness that works against Bridesmaids' often smart, highly class-conscious deconstruction of female friendship and competition. Comedy of humiliation is one thing; a fat lady shitting in a sink is another."

In 2021, members of Writers Guild of America West (WGAW) and Writers Guild of America, East (WGAE) ranked its screenplay 12th in WGA's 101 Greatest Screenplays of the 21st Century (so far). In 2025, the film ranked number 32 on The New York Times' list of "The 100 Best Movies of the 21st Century" and number 90 on the "Readers' Choice" edition of the list.

=== Box office ===
Bridesmaids surpassed Knocked Up to become the top-grossing Judd Apatow production to date, grossing $26,247,410 on its opening weekend and settling for a strong second place behind Thor. Bridesmaids grossed $169,525,235 at the North American box office, and $119,635,696 in international markets, for a worldwide total of $289,160,931. Universal reported that males made up 33 percent of the movie's audience and that 63 percent of the audience was over the age of 30. Speaking on the film's surprising international success, producer Judd Apatow said: "When we worked on Bridesmaids, the discussion was that we weren't going to release it in many foreign countries because the concept of bridesmaids wasn't in a lot of cultures. When it was so successful in the United States, it did really well around the world. That was a wonderful surprise."

=== Accolades ===
McCarthy was nominated for the 2011 Academy Award for Best Supporting Actress, BAFTA Award for Best Actress in a Supporting Role, and Screen Actors Guild Award for Outstanding Performance by a Female Actor in a Supporting Role.

List of awards and nominations
Award	Category	Recipients	Result
Academy Awards	Best Supporting Actress	Melissa McCarthy	Nominated
Academy Awards	Best Original Screenplay	Kristen Wiig and Annie Mumolo	Nominated
American Film Institute	Movies of the Year	Bridesmaids	Won
Art Directors Guild Award	Excellence in Production Design for a Contemporary Film	Jefferson Sage	Nominated
Boston Society of Film Critics	Best Supporting Actress	Melissa McCarthy	Won
British Academy Film Awards	Best Actress in a Supporting Role	Melissa McCarthy	Nominated
British Academy Film Awards	Best Original Screenplay	Kristen Wiig and Annie Mumolo	Nominated
Black Reel Awards	Best Supporting Actress	Maya Rudolph	Nominated
BMI Film & TV Awards	Film Music Award	Michael Andrews	Won
Chicago Film Critics Association	Best Supporting Actress	Melissa McCarthy	Nominated
Costume Designers Guild Awards	Excellence in Contemporary Film	Leesa Evans, Christine Wada	Nominated
Critics' Choice Awards	Best Acting Ensemble	Bridesmaids	Nominated
Critics' Choice Awards	Best Comedy	Bridesmaids	Won
Critics' Choice Awards	Best Supporting Actress	Melissa McCarthy	Nominated
Dallas–Fort Worth Film Critics Association	Best Supporting Actress	Melissa McCarthy	4th Place
Detroit Film Critics Society	Breakthrough Performance	Melissa McCarthy	Nominated
Golden Globe Awards	Best Motion Picture – Musical or Comedy	Bridesmaids	Nominated
Golden Globe Awards	Best Actress – Motion Picture Musical or Comedy	Kristen Wiig	Nominated
Houston Film Critics Society	Best Supporting Actress	Melissa McCarthy	Nominated
New York Film Critics Online	Best Ensemble Cast	Bridesmaids	Won
New York Film Critics Online	Best Supporting Actress	Melissa McCarthy	Won
MTV Movie Awards	Movie of the Year	Bridesmaids	Nominated
MTV Movie Awards	Best Female Performance	Kristen Wiig	Nominated
MTV Movie Awards	Best Comedic Performance	Kristen Wiig	Nominated
MTV Movie Awards	Best Comedic Performance	Melissa McCarthy	Won
MTV Movie Awards	Best Breakthrough Performance	Melissa McCarthy	Nominated
MTV Movie Awards	Best Cast	Bridesmaids	Nominated
MTV Movie Awards	Best Gut-Wrenching Performance	Kristen Wiig, Maya Rudolph, Rose Byrne, Melissa McCarthy, Wendi McLendon-Covey and Ellie Kemper	Won
MTV Movie Awards	Best On-Screen Dirt Bag	Jon Hamm	Nominated
NewNowNext Awards	Next Must-See Movie	Bridesmaids	Won
Online Film Critics Society	Best Supporting Actress	Melissa McCarthy	Nominated
People's Choice Awards	Favorite Comedy Movie	Bridesmaids	Won
People's Choice Awards	Favorite Ensemble Movie Cast	Bridesmaids	Nominated
Producers Guild of America	Best Theatrical Motion Picture	Judd Apatow, Barry Mendel, Clayton Townsend	Nominated
Screen Actors Guild Award	Outstanding Performance by a Cast in a Motion Picture	Bridesmaids	Nominated
Screen Actors Guild Award	Outstanding Performance by a Female Actor in a Supporting Role	Melissa McCarthy	Nominated
St. Louis Gateway Film Critics Association	Best Comedy	Bridesmaids	Won
Teen Choice Awards	Choice Movie – Comedy	Bridesmaids	Nominated
Teen Choice Awards	Choice Movie Actress – Comedy	Kristen Wiig	Nominated
Teen Choice Awards	Choice Movie Actress – Comedy	Maya Rudolph	Nominated
Teen Choice Awards	Choice Movie Hissy Fit	Kristen Wiig	Nominated
Teen Choice Awards	Choice Movie Scene Stealer – Female	Melissa McCarthy	Nominated
Washington D.C. Area Film Critics Association	Best Supporting Actress	Melissa McCarthy	Nominated
Washington D.C. Area Film Critics Association	Best Original Screenplay	Kristen Wiig and Annie Mumolo	Nominated
Washington D.C. Area Film Critics Association	Best Ensemble	Bridesmaids	Won
Writers Guild of America Award	Best Original Screenplay	Kristen Wiig and Annie Mumolo	Nominated

== Home media ==
Bridesmaids was released on DVD and Blu-ray Disc in theatrical (125 minutes) and unrated (130 minutes) versions on September 20, 2011. Special features include a Line-O-Rama (a feature popular among Apatow releases), deleted, extended, and alternate scenes, and a Cholodecki's jewelry store commercial. Another edition commemorating the 100th anniversary of Universal Studios was released on September 4, 2012.

== Cancelled sequel ==
Although there was interest in developing a sequel to Bridesmaids, producer Apatow said, "The key is we have to come up with an idea that is as good or better than the first one" and director Paul Feig said, "Everyone's very busy right now is one of the problems, and kind of doing their own thing, but we're very open to it." When asked about her potential involvement, Wiig told The Hollywood Reporter, "We aren't working on that. Annie [Mumolo] and I aren't planning a sequel. We are writing something else." Following Wiig's statement, reports surfaced that Universal was interested in proceeding without her, instead focusing on developing a story about McCarthy's character Megan. McCarthy dispelled the rumors that she would consider returning for a sequel without Wiig saying, "God, I wouldn't want to. I would never want to. I think it's a terrible idea. I don't know anything about it. But I know that nobody wants to do it unless it's great. If it is, I will show up wherever those ladies are."
