= We Need to Talk About Kevin (film) =

2011 film by Lynne Ramsay

- Theatrical release poster
- Directed by: Lynne Ramsay
- Screenplay by: Lynne Ramsay; Rory Stewart Kinnear
- Based on: We Need to Talk About Kevin by Lionel Shriver
- Produced by: Jennifer Fox; Luc Roeg; Bob Salerno
- Starring: Tilda Swinton; John C. Reilly; Ezra Miller
- Cinematography: Seamus McGarvey
- Edited by: Joe Bini
- Music by: Jonny Greenwood
- Production companies: BBC Films; UK Film Council; Piccadilly Pictures; Footprint Investments; Lipsync Productions; Independent; Artina Films; Rockinghorse Films
- Distributed by: Artificial Eye Paramount Pictures (United Kingdom and Ireland); Oscilloscope Laboratories (United States)
- Release dates: 12 May 2011 (Cannes); 21 October 2011 (United Kingdom); 9 December 2011 (United States)
- Running time: 112 minutes
- Countries: United Kingdom; United States
- Language: English
- Budget: $7 million
- Box office: $10.8 million

We Need to Talk About Kevin is a 2011 psychological thriller drama film directed by Lynne Ramsay, who co-wrote the screenplay with Rory Stewart Kinnear, based on the 2003 novel of the same name by Lionel Shriver. A long process of development and financing began in 2005, with filming commencing in April 2010.

Tilda Swinton stars as a mother struggling to come to terms with her son and the crimes he has committed. The film premiered at the 2011 Cannes Film Festival and was released in the United Kingdom on 21 October 2011.

Swinton was nominated for the Golden Globe Award, Screen Actors Guild Award, and the BAFTA for Best Actress in a Leading Role. The film was listed at no. 74 of Time Out's 100 Best Films of the 21st Century in 2022.

== Plot ==
Armenian mother Eva Khatchadourian, once a successful travel writer, lives alone in a rundown house and works in a travel agency near a prison, where she visits her son, Kevin, who has been convicted of mass-murdering students at his high school. As she copes with the hostility of her neighbors, she reflects upon her memories of raising him.

Despite being a reluctant mother, Eva decides to start a family with her husband, Franklin, giving birth to Kevin. From childhood, Eva views Kevin as detached and difficult. He appears to loathe and deliberately antagonize Eva, who struggles to bond with him. As a baby, he cries incessantly, but only around her; as a child, he resists toilet training, rebuffs Eva's attempts at affection, and shows no interest in anything. He behaves like a happy, loving son in front of his father, Franklin, who dismisses Eva's concerns and makes excuses for Kevin's behavior. One day, Eva cannot handle her frustration with Kevin and throws him against the wall, breaking his arm. Kevin tells Franklin he fell. When he touches his scar on his arm, Eva believes he is using the incident to manipulate her.

When Kevin is confined to bed with a fever, he shows affection towards Eva for the first time as she reads Robin Hood, though his spiteful behavior returns as soon as he recovers. Franklin gives Kevin a bow and arrow and teaches him archery.

Sometime later, Eva gives birth to their second child, Celia, a lively and cheerful girl towards whom Kevin is instantly disdainful. A few years later, Celia's pet guinea pig mysteriously goes missing. Eva finds its remains in the garbage disposal the next day, which she unclogs with drain cleaner. Celia is blinded in one eye after being exposed to the cleaner while Kevin was tasked with watching her, requiring her to wear a glass eye in its place. Eva suspects Kevin injured his sister on purpose, but Franklin defends him. Tired of Eva's distrust of their son, Franklin discusses divorce with her, and Kevin overhears their conversation.

Three days before his 16th birthday, Kevin uses bicycle locks to trap several students in the school gymnasium and murders them with his bow and arrows. After witnessing Kevin's arrest and the bodies of his victims being carried away, Eva returns home to discover that Kevin has murdered Franklin and Celia as well.

On the second anniversary of the massacre, Eva visits Kevin in prison. His demeanor has changed to demure and frightened in anticipation of turning 18 and being transferred to an adult prison. Eva asks him why he committed the murders. Kevin responds that he used to think he knew but is no longer sure. An officer informs them that the visit time is over. Eva embraces Kevin and leaves.

== Cast ==
- Tilda Swinton as Eva Khatchadourian
- John C. Reilly as Franklin Plaskett
- Ezra Miller as Kevin Khatchadourian
  - Jasper Newell as young Kevin
  - Rocky Duer as toddler Kevin
- Ashley Gerasimovich as Celia Khatchadourian
- Siobhan Fallon Hogan as Wanda
- Alex Manette as Colin

== Production ==
In 2005, BBC Films acquired the rights to adapt the book as a film. Executive producers Paula Jalfon and Christine Langan took it through the development stage, and were joined by executive producer Steven Soderbergh.

Lynne Ramsay, who became available after her involvement in the film adaptation of The Lovely Bones came to an end, signed on to direct, and was working on a script with In the Bedroom writer Robert Festinger by 2006. Shriver was offered a consultative role in the production process but declined, stating she had "had it up to [her] eyeballs with that book," though she did express concern for how the film would capture Eva's role as the unreliable narrator. Production had not begun by 2007, though BBC Films renewed the adaptation rights early in the year. In an interview with The Herald in September 2007, Shriver stated that she had not been in contact with Ramsay about the film for over two years. Ramsay's spokesperson told the newspaper that a new script draft was being prepared and, at the time the interview was published, had not been submitted to the producers. Michael Clayton producer Jennifer Fox joined the production team in 2008; the film was expected to begin shooting that year. The script appeared on the 2008 Brit List, a film-industry-compiled list of the best unproduced screenplays in British film. Ramsay's partner Rory Stewart Kinnear also contributed to the final shooting script.

Christine Langan told the London Evening Standard in February 2010 that the long delay in production had been caused by BBC Films having difficulty funding the high budget; Ramsay rewrote the script so the film could be made for a lower cost. The UK Film Council awarded £18,510 to the production from its development fund in the same month. Financial backing was also provided by Footprint Investments LLP, Caemhan Partnership LLP and Lipsync Productions, and production is in association with Artina Films and Forward Films.

Filming commenced on 19 April 2010 on location in Stamford, Connecticut, and concluded on 28 May 2010. A key filming location was J.M. Wright Technical High School in Stamford. Jonny Greenwood composed the score, using instruments including a wire-strung harp.

== Release ==
In October 2009, Independent Film Company picked up the rights to international sales, and made pre-sales at the American Film Market. The film premiered In Competition at the 2011 Cannes Film Festival, where it received positive reviews.

Artificial Eye distributed the film in the United Kingdom from 21 October 2011 and Oscilloscope Laboratories distributed the film theatrically in North America in the winter of 2011. We Need to Talk About Kevin opened in a limited release in North America in a single theater and grossed $24,587, ranking 53rd at the box office. The film ended up earning $1,738,692 in the US, and $5,754,934 internationally, for a total of $7,493,626. We Need to Talk About Kevin was released on Blu-ray and DVD on 29 May 2012.

== Reception ==
=== Critical response ===
We Need to Talk About Kevin received positive reviews. On review aggregator Rotten Tomatoes, the film has an approval rating of 74% based on 207 reviews, with an average rating of 7.4/10. The website's critical consensus reads, "We Need to Talk About Kevin is a masterful blend of drama and horror, with fantastic performances across the board (Tilda Swinton especially, delivering one of her very best)." On Metacritic, the film has a score of 68 out of 100 based on reviews from 37 critics, indicating "generally favorable reviews".

Chicago Sun-Times critic Roger Ebert gave the film 4 out of 4 stars and wrote, "As a portrait of a deteriorating state of mind, We Need to Talk About Kevin is a masterful film." British film critic Mark Kermode of BBC Radio 5 Live named We Need to Talk About Kevin as the Best Film of 2011 and as the second best film of the 2010s. Richard Brody wrote in The New Yorker that We Need to Talk About Kevin "masquerades as a psychological puzzle but is essentially a horror film full of decorous sensationalism." He opined that the film exploited but did not explore the fascination that "bad seed" children exert. Jake Martin, a Jesuit priest and movie critic, wrote in his review in Busted Halo that the film is "[not] yet another installment in the pantheon of post-modern films intent upon assaulting the human desire to give meaning to the world." Instead, he says, "We Need to Talk About Kevin in fact needs to be talked about, as what it is attempting to do by marrying the darkest, most nihilistic components of contemporary cinema with a redemptive message is groundbreaking."

=== Accolades ===
Tilda Swinton was nominated for a number of acting awards, including a Golden Globe Award, Screen Actors Guild and BAFTA for Best Actress in a leading role.

Award	Date of ceremony	Category	Recipients	Result
Austin Film Critics Association		Best Actress	Tilda Swinton	Won
AACTA International Award	27 January 2012	Best Actress	Tilda Swinton	Nominated
AACTA International Award	27 January 2012	Best Direction	Lynne Ramsay	Nominated
AACTA International Award	27 January 2012	Best Film	Jennifer Fox, Luc Roeg, Bob Salerno	Nominated
AACTA International Award	27 January 2012	Best Screenplay	Lynne Ramsay, Rory Stewart Kinnear	Nominated
BAFTA Award	12 February 2012	Best Director	Lynne Ramsay	Nominated
BAFTA Award	12 February 2012	Best Actress in a Leading Role	Tilda Swinton	Nominated
BAFTA Award	12 February 2012	Outstanding British Film	Jennifer Fox, Rory Stewart Kinnear, Lynne Ramsay, Luc Roeg, Robert Salerno	Nominated
Bodil Award	16 March 2013	Best American Film	Lynne Ramsay	Nominated
British Independent Film Award	4 December 2011	Best Director	Lynne Ramsay	Won
British Independent Film Award	4 December 2011	Best Actress	Tilda Swinton	Nominated
British Independent Film Award	4 December 2011	Best British Independent Film		Nominated
British Independent Film Award	4 December 2011	Best Screenplay	Lynne Ramsay, Rory Stewart Kinnear	Nominated
British Independent Film Award	4 December 2011	Best Supporting Actor	Ezra Miller	Nominated
British Independent Film Award	4 December 2011	Best Technical Achievement (for cinematography)	Seamus McGarvey	Nominated
Cannes Film Festival	11–22 May 2011	Palme d'Or	Lynne Ramsay	Nominated
Critics' Choice Movie Awards	12 January 2012	Best Actress	Tilda Swinton	Nominated
Critics' Choice Movie Awards	12 January 2012	Best Young Actor/Actress	Ezra Miller	Nominated
Dallas-Fort Worth Film Critics Association	16 December 2011	Russell Smith Award	Lynne Ramsay	Won
Dallas-Fort Worth Film Critics Association	16 December 2011	Best Actress	Tilda Swinton	Nominated
European Film Award	3 December 2011	Best Actress	Tilda Swinton	Won
Evening Standard British Film Award		Best Film	Lynne Ramsay	Won
Evening Standard British Film Award		Best Actress	Tilda Swinton	Nominated
Evening Standard British Film Award		Best Technical Achievement (for sound design)	Paul Davies	Nominated
Flanders International Film Festival Ghent		Canvas Audience Award	Lynne Ramsay	Won
Flanders International Film Festival Ghent		Grand Prix for Best Film	Lynne Ramsay	Nominated
Golden Globe Award	15 January 2012	Best Actress in a Motion Picture, Drama	Tilda Swinton	Nominated
Irish Film & Television Awards	11 February 2012	Best Director of Photography (Film/TV Drama)	Seamus McGarvey	Won
Irish Film & Television Awards	11 February 2012	Best International Actress	Tilda Swinton	Nominated
London Film Critics' Circle	19 January 2012	British Film of the Year		Won
London Film Critics' Circle	19 January 2012	Actress of the Year	Tilda Swinton	Nominated
London Film Critics' Circle	19 January 2012	British Actress of the Year	Tilda Swinton	Nominated
London Film Critics' Circle	19 January 2012	Director of the Year	Lynne Ramsay	Nominated
London Film Critics' Circle	19 January 2012	Technical Achievement (for sound design)	Paul Davies	Nominated
London Film Festival		Best Film	Lynne Ramsay	Won
National Board of Review of Motion Pictures		Best Actress	Tilda Swinton	Won
National Board of Review of Motion Pictures		Top Ten Independent Films		Won
Online Film Critics Society Award	2 January 2012	Best Actress	Tilda Swinton	Won
Online Film Critics Society Award	2 January 2012	Best Editing	Joe Bini	Nominated
Online Film Critics Society Award	2 January 2012	Best Adapted Screenplay	Lynne Ramsay, Rory Stewart Kinnear	Nominated
Rembrandt Award		Best International Actress	Tilda Swinton	Nominated
San Diego Film Critics Society	14 December 2011	Best Actress	Tilda Swinton	Nominated
San Francisco Film Critics Circle		Best Actress	Tilda Swinton	Won
Screen Actors Guild Award	29 January 2012	Outstanding Performance by a Female Actor in a Leading Role	Tilda Swinton	Nominated
Southeastern Film Critics Association	18 December 2011	Best Actress	Tilda Swinton	Nominated
Tallinn Black Nights Film Festival		Jury Prize: Best Director	Lynne Ramsay	Won
Washington D.C. Area Film Critics Association	5 December 2011	Best Actress	Tilda Swinton	Nominated
Writers' Guild of Great Britain	14 November 2012	Best Film Screenplay	Lynne Ramsay, Rory Stewart Kinnear	Won
