= Shame (2011 film) =

2011 film by Steve McQueen

- Theatrical release poster
- Directed by: Steve McQueen
- Written by: Steve McQueen; Abi Morgan
- Produced by: Iain Canning; Emile Sherman
- Starring: Michael Fassbender; Carey Mulligan; James Badge Dale; Nicole Beharie
- Cinematography: Sean Bobbitt
- Edited by: Joe Walker
- Music by: Harry Escott
- Production companies: Film4; UK Film Council; Lipsync Productions; HanWay Films; See-Saw Films
- Distributed by: Momentum Pictures
- Release dates: 4 September 2011 (Venice); 14 January 2012 (United Kingdom)
- Running time: 101 minutes
- Country: United Kingdom
- Language: English
- Budget: £4.1-4.2 million ($6.5 million)
- Box office: $20.4 million

Shame is a 2011 British psychological drama film produced by Film4 and See-Saw Films, directed by Steve McQueen, and co-written by McQueen and Abi Morgan. It stars Michael Fassbender as a sex addicted New Yorker named Brandon, whose life starts to unravel when his younger sister (Carey Mulligan) shows up in his life. The film's explicit scenes reflecting the protagonist's sexual addiction resulted in a rating of NC-17 in the United States.

Shame premiered at the 68th Venice International Film Festival, where it was selected for its main competition and where Fassbender won the Volpi Cup for Best Actor. It was released in the United Kingdom on 13 January 2012. It received positive reviews from critics, who praised the film’s direction, screenplay, musical score, Fassbender's and Mulligan's performances, and realistic depiction of sexual addiction. Among its numerous accolades, Fassbender received nominations from the Golden Globes and BAFTA Awards, both for Best Actor. The film has since been ranked among one of the best films of the 21st century thus far.

== Plot ==
Brandon Sullivan is an executive living in New York City; he frequently has sex with prostitutes, views pornography, and masturbates several times daily, including at work. One day, during his morning commute, Brandon makes eye contact with a woman wearing an engagement ring on the subway. She initially reciprocates but becomes uncomfortable; when they exit, she disappears into the crowd. Brandon shares a shallow friendship with his adulterous boss, David. One night, after David fails to hit on women at a club, Brandon has sex in a back alley with a woman David was pursuing.

Brandon has been ignoring calls from his sister, Sissy, who is a lounge singer. He arrives at his apartment and is startled to find her in his shower. Sissy has a few gigs in the city and asks to stay. Brandon reluctantly accepts, uncomfortable around her outgoing personality. He later hears her pleading on the telephone with her lover not to reject her. Brandon and David watch Sissy perform "New York, New York" in a bar, making Brandon emotional. David flirts with Sissy and notices scars from self-inflicted wounds on her arms. Sissy has sex with David in her brother's bedroom. Overhearing them, Brandon becomes disturbed and goes out jogging. Later that night, Sissy attempts to lie in bed with Brandon for comfort, but he angrily yells at her to leave.

After the computer system at Brandon's company is infected with a virus, they find that his hard drive is full of pornography. David assumes Brandon's intern is responsible. Brandon goes on a date with co-worker Marianne, who is recently separated. The date starts uneasy, as Brandon arrives late and Marianne is bemused at his dismissal of commitment in relationships, but things improve after they share real chemistry and go home separately on amicable terms.

That night, Sissy accidentally catches Brandon masturbating in his bathroom. Though her initial reaction is lighthearted, Brandon becomes outraged and physically restrains and berates her. Shortly after, she finds his laptop open on a pornographic webcam site; Brandon slams it shut, and an unnerved Sissy leaves. Brandon disposes of his sexual paraphernalia, including his laptop.

At work, he makes further advances on Marianne and the two get a hotel room. After foreplay, Brandon is unable to get an erection. Marianne leaves as he dejectedly sits away from her. Brandon later has aggressive sex with a prostitute in the same room.

Back at his apartment, Brandon chastises Sissy for sleeping with David and tells her to leave. She says that, as family, they should help each other, but Brandon rejects her and calls her a "parasite". He leaves after Sissy highlights Brandon's own troubles.

Brandon goes to a bar and almost seduces a woman until her boyfriend intervenes. After he explicitly describes to him what he was going to do to her, the man brutally beats him outside. When he is barred from another club, he goes to a nearby gay bar and is fellated by a man in a backroom. After leaving, he listens to a voicemail from Sissy, crying as she says that they are not bad people but just come from a bad place. Brandon has a threesome with prostitutes.

While Brandon is riding the subway home, the passengers are asked to disembark due to a police emergency, implying a suicide. He frantically calls Sissy, but she does not answer. Arriving home, he finds Sissy on the bathroom floor covered in blood, having slashed her wrists. He attempts to stop the bleeding while phoning for help. She survives and he affectionately comforts her in the hospital. After leaving, Brandon breaks down in the rain, sobbing alone.

On the subway, Brandon makes eye contact with the woman with the engagement ring again. This time, she doesn’t look away. She stands up, ready to exit the train at an approaching stop. Brandon continues staring at her.

== Cast ==
- Michael Fassbender as Brandon Sullivan
- Carey Mulligan as Sissy Sullivan
- James Badge Dale as David
- Nicole Beharie as Marianne
- Alex Manette as Steven
- Lucy Walters as The Subway Lady
- Elizabeth Masucci as Elizabeth
- Amy Hargreaves as Hotel Lover
- Hannah Ware as Samantha
- Robert Montano as Waiter

== Production ==
=== Development and casting ===
McQueen worked with producer Iain Canning on the 2008 film Hunger and they reunited to develop Shame with Canning and Emile Sherman's UK/Australia-based See-Saw Films. Screenwriter Abi Morgan was chosen to write the script, making it one of two films she worked on with Film4 (the other being The Iron Lady).

McQueen's lead actor in Hunger, Michael Fassbender, was the first and only choice to play the lead role in Shame. Actors Carey Mulligan and James Badge Dale joined the cast in December 2010 to play the younger sister and boss, respectively, of Fassbender's character. "I had so many passes I couldn't even tell you", said casting director Avy Kaufman, who faced the challenge of casting an NC-17-rated film. Kaufman had a unique assignment from McQueen, who wanted top-quality actors even for tiny parts – like Brandon's fly-by-night sexual partners. "The idea was that those partners would propel the story forward with their silence, showing Brandon's state of mind, or even suggesting the history of their relationship with a look or a gesture. The actresses, of course, also had to meet certain physical requirements."

=== Filming ===
Production was scheduled to begin on location in New York in January 2011. Fassbender later commented in an interview that he just began shooting his scenes in early March. A majority of the film was shot in and around Chelsea. The office scenes were filmed in the Citigroup Center and the hotel scenes and nightclub scene were shot at the Standard Hotel in the Meatpacking District.

== Soundtrack ==
A soundtrack was released via Sony Classical Records on 6 December 2011.

== Release ==
Shame premiered at The 68th Venice Film Festival in the main competition. Fassbender won the Volpi Cup for Best Actor at the Venice Film Festival for his role in the film. It was also screened at The 36th Toronto International Film Festival, The 49th New York Film Festival, The 55th B.F.I. London Film Festival and The 34th Starz Denver Film Festival.

Shame was released in the UK on 13 January 2012, after the limited release screening in the US that commenced on 2 December 2011. Fox Searchlight Pictures paid around $400,000 to acquire the United States distribution rights of Shame.

=== US rating ===
The film was rated NC-17 by the Motion Picture Association of America with the rating descriptor being for "some explicit sexual content". Fox Searchlight did not appeal the rating or make cuts for the less restrictive R rating. Searchlight president Steve Gilula said, "I think NC-17 is a badge of honor, not a scarlet letter. We believe it is time for the rating to become usable in a serious manner".

=== Home media ===
The film was released on Blu-ray and DVD in April 2012.

== Reception ==
=== Critical response ===
On review aggregator Rotten Tomatoes, 79% of critics have given the film a positive review based on 230 reviews, with an average rating of 7.5/10. The website's critics consensus reads, "Boasting stellar performances by Michael Fassbender and Carey Mulligan, Shame is a powerful plunge into the mania of addiction affliction." On Metacritic, it has a weighted average score of 72 out of 100, based on 41 critics, indicating "generally favorable reviews".

Roger Ebert of Chicago Sun-Times gave the film four out of four stars and described it as "a powerful film" and "courageous and truthful", commenting that "this is a great act of filmmaking and acting. I don't believe I would be able to see it twice." Ebert later named it the second best film of 2011. Todd McCarthy of The Hollywood Reporter gave the film a positive review, stating, "Driven by a brilliant, ferocious performance by Michael Fassbender, Shame is a real walk on the wild side, a scorching look at a case of sexual addiction that's as all-encompassing as a craving for drugs."

Dan Bullock of The Hollywood News said, "Shame is captivating and intensely intimate. McQueen has followed Hunger with an unflinching and compelling film that explores the depths of addiction and the consequential destruction and demise of the mind and although it is sometimes difficult to watch, you won't be able to keep your eyes off it." Justin Chang of Variety gave the film a positive review, commenting, "A mesmerizing companion piece to his 2008 debut, Hunger, this more approachable but equally uncompromising drama likewise fixes its gaze on the uses and abuses of the human body, as Michael Fassbender again strips himself down, in every way an actor can, for McQueen's rigorous but humane interrogation."

Writing in The New York Times, A. O. Scott said, "McQueen wants to show how the intensity of Brandon's need shuts him off from real intimacy, but this seems to be a foregone conclusion, the result of an elegant experiment that was rigged from the start." Donald Clarke of The Irish Times called it "the most wholesome film made about unwholesomeness since The Exorcist" noting that "the underlying current of Puritanism is, however, more than a little oppressive".

Writing for MUBI, Ignatiy Vishnevetsky said, "Every scene [is] ladled with big dollops of cinema's most respectable cop-out: ambiguity ... Shame wears its emptiness like a badge of honor; McQueen is trying for banal blankness, and though he succeeds in that respect, you kind of wish that a filmmaker (and one with a background as an artist at that) would aspire to do more than just say nothing."

In the blog for the British journal The Art of Psychiatry, psychiatrist Abby Seltzer praised Mulligan for her portrayal of an individual with borderline personality disorder. While she had initially approached the film warily because of reviews that focused on Brandon's sex addiction, she found it "a moving and accurate portrayal of psychopathology ... [that should be] compulsory viewing for all practising clinicians."

=== Top-ten lists ===
- 1st – David Fear, Time Out New York
- 1st – Gregory Ellwood, HitFix
- 2nd – Joshua Rothkopf, Time Out New York
- 2nd – Roger Ebert, Chicago Sun-Times
- 2nd – Marc Savlov, Austin Chronicle
- 3rd – Marshall Fine, Hollywood & Fine
- 3rd – Peter Knegt, Indiewire
- 3rd – James Berardinelli, Reelviews
- 4th – Kimberley Jones, Austin Chronicle
- 5th – Kate Erbland, Boxoffice Magazine
- 5th – Kristopher Tapley, HitFix
- 5th – Sasha Stone, Awards Daily
- 6th – James Rocchi, Boxoffice Magazine
- 6th – Scott Feinberg, The Hollywood Reporter
- 6th – Elizabeth Weitzman, New York Daily News
- 6th – Christopher Bell, Indiewire
- 7th – Liam Lacey and Rick Groen, The Globe and Mail
- 7th – Aaron Hills, Village Voice
- 8th – Kevin Jagernauth, Indiewire
- 10th – Alison Willmore, The A.V. Club
- 10th – Don Kaye, MSN Movies
- 10th – Todd McCarthy, The Hollywood Reporter

In 2016, it was ranked one of the 100 greatest motion pictures since 2000 in a critics' poll conducted by BBC Culture.

=== Accolades ===
Date of ceremony	Group	Category	Recipient(s)	Result
10 September 2011	Venice Film Festival	CinemAvvenire Award for Best Film	Iain Canning, Emile Sherman	Won
10 September 2011	Venice Film Festival	FIPRESCI Prize for Best Film	Iain Canning, Emile Sherman	Won
10 September 2011	Venice Film Festival	Golden Lion for Best Film	Steve McQueen	Nominated
10 September 2011	Venice Film Festival	Volpi Cup for Best Actor	Michael Fassbender	Won
30 November 2011	New York Film Critics Circle Awards	Best Actor	Michael Fassbender	2nd place
30 November 2011	New York Film Critics Circle Awards	Best Supporting Actress	Carey Mulligan	2nd place
1 December 2011	National Board of Review Awards	Spotlight Award	Michael Fassbender (Also for A Dangerous Method, Jane Eyre, and X-Men: First Class)	Won
4 December 2011	British Independent Film Awards	Best British Independent Film	Iain Canning, Emile Sherman	Nominated
4 December 2011	British Independent Film Awards	Best Director	Steve McQueen	Nominated
4 December 2011	British Independent Film Awards	Best Screenplay	Steve McQueen, Abi Morgan	Nominated
4 December 2011	British Independent Film Awards	Best Performance by an Actor in a British Independent Film	Michael Fassbender	Won
4 December 2011	British Independent Film Awards	Best Supporting Actress	Carey Mulligan	Nominated
4 December 2011	British Independent Film Awards	Best Technical Achievement – Editing	Joe Walker	Nominated
4 December 2011	British Independent Film Awards	Best Technical Achievement – Cinematography	Sean Bobbitt	Nominated
5 December 2011	Washington D.C. Area Film Critics Association Awards	Best Actor	Michael Fassbender	Nominated
5 December 2011	Washington D.C. Area Film Critics Association Awards	Best Supporting Actress	Carey Mulligan	Nominated
11 December 2011	Los Angeles Film Critics Association Awards	Best Actor	Michael Fassbender (Also for A Dangerous Method, Jane Eyre, and X-Men: First Class)	Won
12 December 2011	African-American Film Critics Association Awards	Best Picture	Iain Canning, Emile Sherman	5th place
12 December 2011	African-American Film Critics Association Awards	Best Director	Steve McQueen	Won
12 December 2011	San Diego Film Critics Society Awards	Best Supporting Actress	Carey Mulligan	Nominated
14 December 2011	Houston Film Critics Society Awards	Best Actor	Michael Fassbender	Won
14 December 2011	Houston Film Critics Society Awards	Best Score	Harry Escott	Nominated
16 December 2011	Detroit Film Critics Society Awards	Best Actor	Michael Fassbender	Won
16 December 2011	Detroit Film Critics Society Awards	Best Supporting Actress	Carey Mulligan	Won
16 December 2011	Dallas-Fort Worth Film Critics Association Awards	Top 10 Films of the Year	Iain Canning, Emile Sherman	9th place
16 December 2011	Dallas-Fort Worth Film Critics Association Awards	Best Actor	Michael Fassbender	3rd place
16 December 2011	Dallas-Fort Worth Film Critics Association Awards	Best Supporting Actress	Carey Mulligan	5th place
18 December 2011	Satellite Awards	Best Film – Drama	Iain Canning, Emile Sherman	Nominated
18 December 2011	Satellite Awards	Best Director	Steve McQueen	Nominated
18 December 2011	Satellite Awards	Best Original Screenplay	Steve McQueen, Abi Morgan	Nominated
18 December 2011	Satellite Awards	Best Actor – Motion Picture Drama	Michael Fassbender	Nominated
18 December 2011	Satellite Awards	Best Supporting Actress – Motion Picture	Carey Mulligan	Nominated
18 December 2011	Satellite Awards	Best Editing	Joe Walker	Nominated
19 December 2011	Florida Film Critics Awards	Best Actor	Michael Fassbender	Won
19 December 2011	St. Louis Gateway Film Critics Association Awards	Best Actor	Michael Fassbender	Nominated
19 December 2011	Chicago Film Critics Association Awards	Best Actor	Michael Fassbender	Nominated
19 December 2011	Chicago Film Critics Association Awards	Best Supporting Actress	Carey Mulligan	Nominated
2 January 2012	Online Film Critics Society Awards	Best Actor	Michael Fassbender	Won
2 January 2012	Online Film Critics Society Awards	Best Supporting Actress	Carey Mulligan	Nominated
9 January 2012	Alliance of Women Film Journalists Awards	Best Actor	Michael Fassbender	Won
9 January 2012	Denver Film Critics Society Awards	Best Actor	Michael Fassbender	Nominated
10 January 2012	Vancouver Film Critics Circle Awards	Best Actor	Michael Fassbender	Won
12 January 2012	Broadcast Film Critics Association Awards	Best Actor	Michael Fassbender	Nominated
12 January 2012	Broadcast Film Critics Association Awards	Best Supporting Actress	Carey Mulligan	Nominated
15 January 2012	Golden Globe Awards	Best Actor – Motion Picture Drama	Michael Fassbender	Nominated
19 January 2012	London Film Critics' Circle Awards	British Film of the Year	Iain Canning, Emile Sherman	Nominated
19 January 2012	London Film Critics' Circle Awards	Actor of the Year	Michael Fassbender	Nominated
19 January 2012	London Film Critics' Circle Awards	British Actor of the Year	Michael Fassbender (Also for A Dangerous Method)	Won
19 January 2012	London Film Critics' Circle Awards	British Actress of the Year	Carey Mulligan (Also for Drive)	Nominated
27 January 2012	Australian Academy of Cinema and Television Arts Awards	Best Actor	Michael Fassbender	Nominated
6 February 2012	Evening Standard British Film Awards	Best Film	Steve McQueen	Nominated
6 February 2012	Evening Standard British Film Awards	Best Actor	Michael Fassbender (Also for Jane Eyre)	Won
6 February 2012	Evening Standard British Film Awards	Best Actress	Carey Mulligan	Nominated
6 February 2012	Evening Standard British Film Awards	London Film Museum Award for Technical Achievement	Sean Bobbitt	Nominated
11 February 2012	Irish Film and Television Awards	Best Actor in a Lead Role in a Feature Film	Michael Fassbender	Won
12 February 2012	BAFTA Awards	Outstanding British Film	Steve McQueen, Iain Canning, Emile Sherman, Abi Morgan	Nominated
12 February 2012	BAFTA Awards	Best Actor in a Leading Role	Michael Fassbender	Nominated
17 February 2012	Kermode Awards	Best Actor	Michael Fassbender	Won
25 February 2012	Independent Spirit Awards	Best Foreign Film	Iain Canning, Emile Sherman	Nominated
1 December 2012	European Film Awards	PCA for Best European Film	Steve McQueen	Nominated
1 December 2012	European Film Awards	Best Film	Steve McQueen, Abi Morgan, Iain Canning, Emile Sherman	Nominated
1 December 2012	European Film Awards	Best Director	Steve McQueen	Nominated
1 December 2012	European Film Awards	Best Actor	Michael Fassbender	Nominated
1 December 2012	European Film Awards	Best Editor	Joe Walker	Won
1 December 2012	European Film Awards	Best Cinematographer	Sean Bobbitt	Won
5 January 2013	Belgian Film Critics Association	Grand Prix	Shame	Nominated
