= Will Reiser =

American screenwriter and producer

- Born: United States
- Occupations: Screenwriter, producer
- Relatives: Paul Reiser (cousin)
- Writing career
- Language: English
- Notable work: 50/50

Will Reiser is an American screenwriter and producer. He is best known for writing the 2011 film 50/50, which was based on his own experience with cancer.

== Early life ==
He is the cousin of actor and comedian Paul Reiser.

Reiser attended Hampshire College in Amherst, Massachusetts, graduating in 2003.

== Career ==
Reiser first worked as a producer in a number of TV productions, such as Da Ali G Show. In 2005, during his time working as an associate producer, he was diagnosed with a form of spinal cancer at the age of 25. After he underwent surgery, he was urged by Seth Rogen and Evan Goldberg, who also worked on Da Ali G Show, to write a screenplay based on his experiences. In 2008, Reiser completed his first draft of 50/50, his first screenplay. With Rogen and Goldberg producing the film, the script was bought by Mandate Pictures, with Rogen also attached to star in the film as the best friend of the protagonist, Adam (played by Joseph Gordon-Levitt), and the film was released in September 2011. At the time of the film's release, Reiser had been cancer-free for six years. He won numerous awards for 50/50, including the Independent Spirit Award for Best First Screenplay and the National Board of Review of Motion Pictures award for Best Original Screenplay. He was also honored at the 2012 Annual OMG! Cancer Summit for Young Adults for his "courage, irreverence and creativity in achieving meaningful and impactful change on behalf of the young adult cancer survivorship movement".

In September 2011, it was reported that Reiser was working on an American version of the German comedy film Men... That same month, it was also reported that Reiser was working on a film titled Jamaica, based on a vacation he took to Jamaica with his grandma at the age of 14. Jonathan Levine, who directed 50/50, was attached to direct the film.

== Filmography ==
=== Film ===
| Year | Feature film | Credit/Role | Notes | Ref. |
|---|---|---|---|---|
| 2011 | 50/50 | Writer, executive producer, actor | Independent Spirit Award for Best First Screenplay; National Board of Review Award for Best Original Screenplay; Washington DC Area Film Critics Association Award for Best Original Screenplay; Nominated – Broadcast Film Critics Association Award for Best Screenplay; Nominated – San Diego Film Critics Society Award for Best Original Screenplay; Nominated – Writers Guild of America Award for Best Original Screenplay | |

=== TV ===
| Year | Television Show | Credit/Role | Notes | Ref. |
|---|---|---|---|---|
| 2003 | Da Ali G Show | Associate producer | | |
| 2004 | Best Week Ever | Field producer | | |
| 2004 | Distraction | Segment producer | | |
| 2005 | Red State Diaries | Producer | | |
| 2006 | Garage Band Makeover | Producer | | |
| 2006 | Assume the Position with Mr. Wuhl | Writer, field producer, supervising producer | | |
| 2006 | Talkshow with Spike Feresten | Field producer | One episode | |
| 2007 | The Unseen Kind-Hearted Beast | Associate producer | | |
