= Beginners =

2010 American film by Mike Mills

- Promotional poster
- Directed by: Mike Mills
- Written by: Mike Mills
- Produced by: Leslie Urdang; Dean Vanech; Miranda de Pencier; Jay Van Hoy; Lars Knudsen
- Starring: Ewan McGregor; Christopher Plummer; Mélanie Laurent; Goran Višnjić
- Cinematography: Kasper Tuxen
- Edited by: Olivier Bugge Coutté
- Music by: Roger Neill; David Palmer; Brian Reitzell; Jelly Roll Morton
- Production companies: Olympus Pictures; Parts & Labor; Northwood Productions
- Distributed by: Focus Features
- Release dates: September 11, 2010 (TIFF); June 3, 2011 (United States)
- Running time: 104 minutes
- Country: United States
- Language: English
- Budget: $3.2 million
- Box office: $14.3 million

Beginners is a 2010 American romantic comedy drama film written and directed by Mike Mills. Based on the coming out of Mills' father at age 75, five years before his death, it tells the story of a man reflecting on the life and death of his father, while trying to forge a new romantic relationship with a woman dealing with father-issues of her own.

After its premiere at the 2010 Toronto International Film Festival, the Los Angeles Times heralded Beginners as a "heady, heartfelt film" with a cast who have "a strong sense of responsibility to their real-world counterparts". Christopher Plummer won many accolades, including an Academy Award for Best Supporting Actor.

== Plot ==
(Throughout the film, scenes of Oliver Fields' memories of his deceased parents are intercut, as flashbacks, into the narrative of his developing relationship with Anna Wallace.)

In Los Angeles in 2003, a few months after the death of his father, Hal, from lung cancer, 38-year-old graphic designer Oliver often thinks about his relationship with Hal near the end of his life. Hal had come out to Oliver six months after Georgia, Hal's wife of 44 years and Oliver's mother, died of cancer, and explored life as an openly gay man from the age of 75 until he died four years later. He became active in the local gay community, found love with a much-younger man named Andy, and became closer to Oliver than he had been previously. Oliver helped Hal during his cancer treatments, and he noted the grace, good humor, and, sometimes, seeming-denial with which Hal faced his fate.

Hal and Georgia had known each other since high school, and eventually she asked him to marry her, saying she could "fix" his homosexuality. He saw a psychiatrist for a time and they were married until her death, but they always had a fairly cool relationship, and Oliver recalls his childhood with an unfulfilled, but loving, Georgia, while Hal, a museum director, was often absent, both physically and emotionally. Not wanting to end up like his parents, Oliver never settled for a passionless relationship, which has left him with only Hal's Jack Russell Terrier, Arthur, who does not like to be left alone, for company.

Oliver's work friends get him to go to a costume party, where he meets Anna, a French actress. Although she communicates by writing messages because she has laryngitis and temporarily cannot speak, they instantly connect. They go back to Anna's hotel room, where Oliver tells her about his parents, and they kiss, but then Anna asks if they can just go to sleep, and Oliver agrees. The next day, Anna has to go to New York for an audition, but she says she wants to see Oliver when she gets back. Inspired by his father's attitude towards the end of his life, Oliver decides to pursue a romance with Anna.

When Anna returns, she and Oliver see a lot of each other and fall in love. Eventually, he asks her to move in with him, and she does, but Anna, who left home when she was 16 and has a strained relationship with her depressive father and, like Oliver, is the one who has ended all of her serious romantic relationships, never unpacks her suitcase, which bothers Oliver. Things become awkward between them, as neither knows how to build a life with someone else, and, after a short time, Oliver says living together does not feel right, and Anna decides to move back to New York City.

Before long, Oliver misses Anna, but she does not answer his calls, so he drops Arthur off with Andy and flies to New York to talk to her. He calls her again from outside her apartment and she answers, and it turns out she never left Los Angeles. When Oliver gets home, Anna comes over, and, though they do not know what will happen next, they both seem optimistic about their future together.

== Cast ==
- Ewan McGregor as Oliver Fields
  - Keegan Boos as Young Oliver
- Christopher Plummer as Hal Fields, Oliver's father
- Mélanie Laurent as Anna Wallace, a French actress with whom Oliver begins a relationship
- Goran Višnjić as Andy, Hal's much-younger lover
- Kai Lennox as Elliot, Oliver's friend and co-worker
- Mary Page Keller as Georgia Fields, Oliver's mother
- China Shavers as Shauna, Oliver's friend and co-worker
- Reynaldo Pacheco as Juan, (Note: The character is called "Juan" in the film, but named "Julio" in the film's credits.) Hal's hospice nurse
- Jennifer Hasty as Hal's Secretary
- Jose Yenque as Robert
- Cosmo as Arthur, Hal's (and later Oliver's) dog

Lou Taylor Pucci, the star of Mike Mills' previous film Thumbsucker (2005), has a cameo appearance in the film as the man dressed as a magician at the costume party.

== Production ==
Much of the film is based on director Mike Mills' experiences after his own father came out of the closet following his mother's death. It was shot using the Red One digital camera.

== Reception ==
On review aggregator website Rotten Tomatoes, the film has an approval rating of 86% based on 159 reviews, with an average score of 7.5/10; the site's "critics consensus" reads: "Wearing its twee heart on its sleeve, Beginners explores the depths of modern, multi-generational romance with wit and depth." On Metacritic, which assigns a rating to reviews, the film has an average score of 81 out of 100, based on 36 critics, indicating "universal acclaim".

Roger Ebert of the Chicago Sun-Times gave the film three-and-a-half stars out of four, writing: "It's a hopeful fable with deep optimism and a cheerful style that kids itself." Peter Debruge of Variety called it "deeply poignant and disarmingly personal". Lisa Schwarzbaum of Entertainment Weekly wrote: "The movie darts, dreams, and sometimes seems to dance. The great Plummer, meanwhile, creates an inspiring, fully rounded man in late bloom, and McGregor responds with a performance to match." Diego Costa of Slant Magazine said: "One of the most distinct pleasures of Beginners is the way it puts together fragments of someone's life — presumably the filmmaker's, although little does it matter — with humility, and without vying for some complete whole." Calvin Wilson of the St. Louis Post-Dispatch called the film "A lovably quirky comedy drama with a rhythm all its own."

=== Accolades ===
In 2011, Beginners won the Gotham Award for Best Feature, which it shared with The Tree of Life. For his performance, Christopher Plummer won many awards, including at the National Board of Review Awards, Los Angeles Film Critics Association Awards, Online Film Critics Society Awards, Denver Film Critics Society Awards, Golden Globe Awards, Screen Actors Guild Awards, British Academy Film Awards, and Academy Awards. Plummer also won Best Supporting Male at the Independent Spirit Awards, and the film was nominated for Best Feature, Best Director, and Best Screenplay at that event. In addition, Plummer was nominated for the Satellite Award for Best Supporting Actor.
