= List of accolades received by Moneyball (film) =

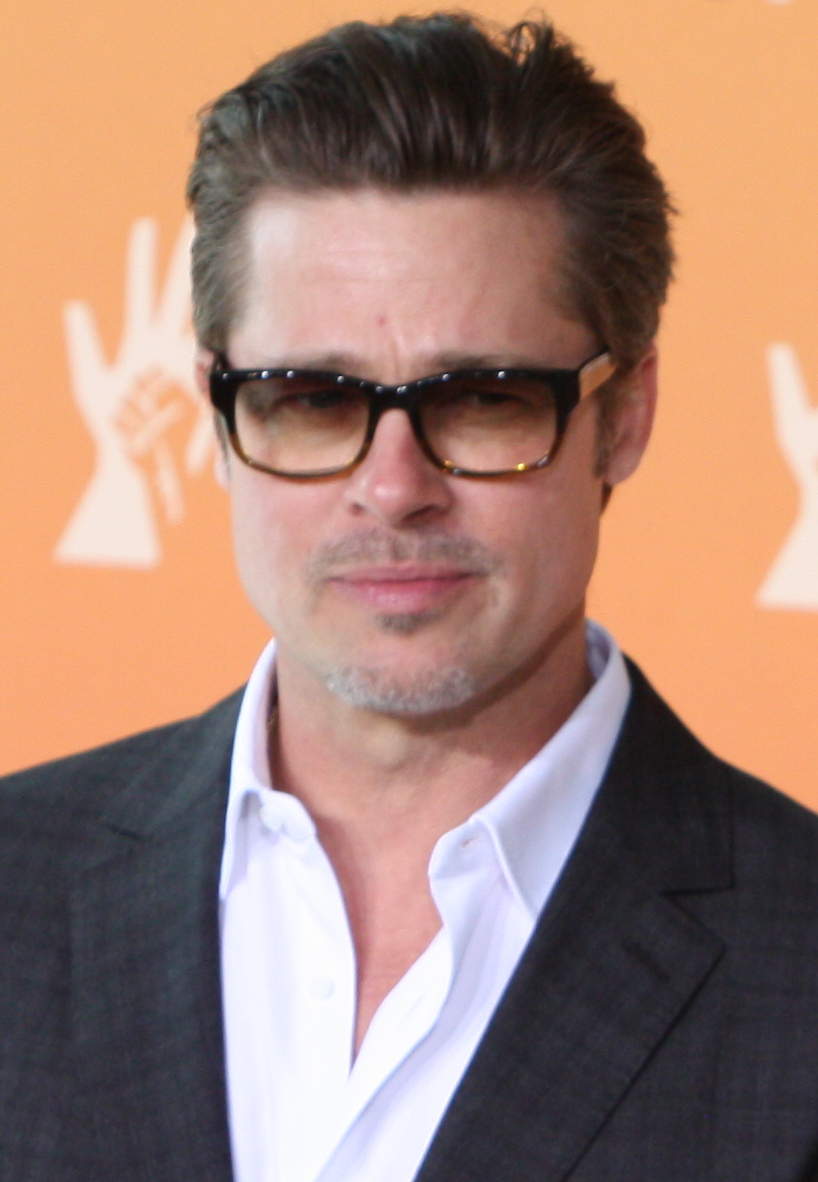
- Brad Pitt (pictured in 2014) received several awards and nominations for co-producing and acting in the film.
Accolades
Award	Won	Nominated
AACTA Awards	0	3
AARP Annual Movies for Grownups Awards	0	1
Academy Awards	0	6
African-American Film Critics Association	1	2
Alliance of Women Film Journalists	1	2
American Cinema Editors	0	1
American Film Institute	1	1
Australian Cinematographers Society	0	1
BMI Awards	1	1
Boston Society of Film Critics	1	2
British Academy Film Awards	0	3
Chicago Film Critics Association	1	1
Cinema Audio Society Awards	0	1
Critics' Choice Movie Awards	1	3
Dallas–Fort Worth Film Critics Association	0	2
Detroit Film Critics Society	1	2
Gold Derby Awards	1	2
Golden Globe Awards	0	4
Golden Schmoes Awards	0	3
Golden Trailer Awards	1	1
Hollywood Film Awards	1	1
Houston Film Critics Society	0	1
IndieWire Critic's Poll	0	1
Japan Academy Prize	0	1
Motion Picture Sound Editors	0	1
National Society of Film Critics	1	2
New York Film Critics Circle	2	2
Online Film Critics Society	0	1
Palm Springs International Film Festival	1	1
People's Choice Awards	0	1
Producers Guild of America Awards	0	1
San Diego Film Critics Society	1	2
Satellite Awards	0	4
Screen Actors Guild Awards	0	2
St. Louis Film Critics Association	0	3
Toronto Film Critics Association	1	1
USC Scripter Award	0	1
Vancouver Film Critics Circle	0	1
Village Voice Film Poll	3	3
Washington D.C. Area Film Critics Association	0	2
Writers Guild of America Award	0	1
- Total number of wins and nominations
Totals	19	73
- References

Moneyball is a 2011 American sports drama film directed by Bennett Miller. The film features Brad Pitt in the lead role, who also co-produced it, with Jonah Hill, Philip Seymour Hoffman, and Chris Pratt playing supporting roles. Based on the 2003 nonfiction book of the same name by Michael Lewis, the film focuses on the 2002 season of the Oakland Athletics baseball team. The team's general manager Billy Beane (Pitt), and assistant general manager Peter Brand (Hill), decide to build the team by opting for a sabermetric approach to selecting players. The screenplay was written by Aaron Sorkin and Steven Zaillian, while Stan Chervin wrote the story.

Made on a budget of $50 million, Moneyball premiered at the 2011 Toronto International Film Festival on September 9, 2011, and had its theatrical release two weeks later on September 23, 2011. The film was successful at the box office, earning over $110 million. Rotten Tomatoes, a review aggregator, surveyed 254 reviews and judged 94% to be positive. The film was nominated for 73 awards, winning 19; its screenplay and the performances of Pitt and Hill received the most attention from award groups.

At the 84th Academy Awards, Moneyball received six nominations including Best Picture, Best Actor for Pitt, Best Supporting Actor for Hill, and Best Adapted Screenplay for Sorkin, Zaillian and Chervin, winning none. The film earned four nominations at the 69th Golden Globe Awards, and three nominations at the 65th British Academy Film Awards. Pitt, and Sorkin and Zaillian won the Best Actor and Best Screenplay respectively at the New York Film Critics Circle. At the 18th Screen Actors Guild Awards, both Pitt and Hill received nominations for their roles. The film earned four nominations at the 16th Satellite Awards – Best Film, Best Actor – Motion Picture, Best Supporting Actor – Motion Picture, and Best Adapted Screenplay. Both the American Film Institute and Dallas–Fort Worth Film Critics Association included Moneyball in their list of top ten films of 2011. The film was ranked sixth by the African-American Film Critics Association, and won Best Song for Kerris Dorsey's rendition of the song "The Show". (Note: “The Show” was originally recorded by Australia-based pop singer Lenka in 2008 as part of her first studio album, Lenka.) The film's composer, Mychael Danna, won the Film Music Award at the BMI Awards. Miller won for Best Director at the 15th Hollywood Film Awards. Pitt as well as Sorkin and Zaillian were placed in the top ten of their respective categories, Best Actor and Best Screenplay, in the Village Voice Film Polls for 2011.

== Awards and nominations ==
Award	Date of ceremony	Category	Recipient(s)	Result	Ref.
AACTA Awards	January 27, 2012	Best Film – International	Michael De Luca, Rachael Horovitz and Brad Pitt	Nominated	
AACTA Awards	January 27, 2012	Best Actor – International	Brad Pitt	Nominated	
AACTA Awards	January 27, 2012	Best Screenplay – International	Stan Chervin, Aaron Sorkin and Steven Zaillian	Nominated	
AARP Annual Movies for Grownups Awards	February 6, 2012	Best Screenplay	Aaron Sorkin and Steven Zaillian	Nominated	
Academy Awards	February 26, 2012	Best Picture	Michael De Luca, Rachael Horovitz and Brad Pitt	Nominated	
Academy Awards	February 26, 2012	Best Actor	Brad Pitt	Nominated	
Academy Awards	February 26, 2012	Best Supporting Actor	Jonah Hill	Nominated	
Academy Awards	February 26, 2012	Best Adapted Screenplay	Stan Chervin, Aaron Sorkin and Steven Zaillian	Nominated	
Academy Awards	February 26, 2012	Best Film Editing	Christopher Tellefsen	Nominated	
Academy Awards	February 26, 2012	Best Sound Mixing	Deb Adair, Ron Bochar, David Giammarco and Ed Novick	Nominated	
African-American Film Critics Association	December 12, 2011	Best Picture	Moneyball	6th place	
African-American Film Critics Association	December 12, 2011	Best Song	"The Show" by Kerris Dorsey, Jason Reeves and Lenka	Won	
Alliance of Women Film Journalists	January 10, 2012	Best Actor	Brad Pitt	Nominated	
Alliance of Women Film Journalists	January 10, 2012	Best Adapted Screenplay	Aaron Sorkin and Steven Zaillian (Note: Tied with Alexander Payne, Nat Faxon and Jim Rash for The Descendants.)	Won	
American Cinema Editors	February 18, 2012	Best Edited Feature Film – Dramatic	Christopher Tellefsen	Nominated	
American Film Institute	December 11, 2011	AFI Movies of the Year	Moneyball	Won	
Australian Cinematographers Society	May 5, 2012	International Award for Cinematography	Wally Pfister	Nominated	
BMI Awards	May 17, 2012	Film Music Award	Mychael Danna	Won	
Boston Society of Film Critics	December 11, 2011	Best Actor	Brad Pitt	Won	
Boston Society of Film Critics	December 11, 2011	Best Screenplay	Aaron Sorkin and Steven Zaillian	Nominated	
British Academy Film Awards	February 12, 2012	Best Actor in a Leading Role	Brad Pitt	Nominated	
British Academy Film Awards	February 12, 2012	Best Actor in a Supporting Role	Jonah Hill	Nominated	
British Academy Film Awards	February 12, 2012	Best Adapted Screenplay	Aaron Sorkin and Steven Zaillian	Nominated	
Casting Society of America	October 29, 2012	Big Budget Feature – Drama	Francine Maisler and Lauren Grey	Nominated	
Chicago Film Critics Association	January 7, 2012	Best Adapted Screenplay	Aaron Sorkin and Steven Zaillian	Won	
Cinema Audio Society Awards	June 15, 2012	Outstanding Achievement in Sound Mixing for a Feature Film	Deb Adair, Ron Bochar, David Giammarco, Brad Haehnel and Ed Novick	Nominated	
Critics' Choice Movie Awards	January 12, 2012	Best Picture	Moneyball	Nominated	
Critics' Choice Movie Awards	January 12, 2012	Best Actor	Brad Pitt	Nominated	
Critics' Choice Movie Awards	January 12, 2012	Best Adapted Screenplay	Stan Chervin, Aaron Sorkin and Steven Zaillian	Won	
Dallas–Fort Worth Film Critics Association	December 16, 2011	Best Film	Moneyball	10th Place	
Dallas–Fort Worth Film Critics Association	December 16, 2011	Best Actor	Brad Pitt	4th Place	
Detroit Film Critics Society	December 16, 2011	Best Actor	Brad Pitt	Nominated	
Detroit Film Critics Society	December 16, 2011	Best Screenplay	Aaron Sorkin and Steven Zaillian	Won	
Gold Derby Awards	February 25, 2012	Best Actor	Brad Pitt	Nominated	
Gold Derby Awards	February 25, 2012	Best Adapted Screenplay	Aaron Sorkin and Steven Zaillian	Won	
Golden Globe Awards	January 15, 2012	Best Motion Picture – Drama	Moneyball	Nominated	
Golden Globe Awards	January 15, 2012	Best Actor – Motion Picture Drama	Brad Pitt	Nominated	
Golden Globe Awards	January 15, 2012	Best Supporting Actor – Motion Picture	Jonah Hill	Nominated	
Golden Globe Awards	January 15, 2012	Best Screenplay	Aaron Sorkin and Steven Zaillian	Nominated	
Golden Schmoes Awards	February 24, 2012	Best Actor of the Year	Brad Pitt	Nominated	
Golden Schmoes Awards	February 24, 2012	Best Supporting Actor of the Year	Jonah Hill	Nominated	
Golden Schmoes Awards	February 24, 2012	Best Screenplay of the Year	Aaron Sorkin and Steven Zaillian	Nominated	
Golden Trailer Awards	May 31, 2012	Best Music TV Spot	Moneyball	Won	
Hollywood Film Awards	October 24, 2011	Best Director	Bennett Miller	Won	
Houston Film Critics Society	December 14, 2011	Best Actor	Brad Pitt	Nominated	
IndieWire Critic's Poll	December 19, 2011	Best Screenplay	Aaron Sorkin and Steven Zaillian	3rd place	
Japan Academy Prize	March 2, 2012	Outstanding Foreign Language Film	Moneyball	Nominated	
Motion Picture Sound Editors	February 19, 2012	Best Sound Editing: Dialogue and ADR in a Feature Film	Moneyball	Nominated	
National Society of Film Critics Awards	January 7, 2012	Best Actor	Brad Pitt (Note: Pitt also won the award for The Tree of Life.)	Won	
National Society of Film Critics Awards	January 7, 2012	Best Screenplay	Aaron Sorkin and Steven Zaillian	Runner-up	
New York Film Critics Circle	November 29, 2011	Best Actor	Brad Pitt	Won	
New York Film Critics Circle	November 29, 2011	Best Screenplay	Aaron Sorkin and Steven Zaillian	Won	
Online Film Critics Society	January 2, 2012	Best Adapted Screenplay	Aaron Sorkin and Steven Zaillian	Nominated	
Palm Springs International Film Festival	January 7, 2012	Desert Palm Achievement Award for Acting	Brad Pitt	Won	
People's Choice Awards	January 11, 2012	Favorite Drama Movie	Moneyball	Nominated	
Producers Guild of America Awards	January 21, 2012	Best Theatrical Motion Picture	Michael De Luca, Rachael Horovitz and Brad Pitt	Nominated	
San Diego Film Critics Society	December 14, 2011	Best Actor	Brad Pitt	Nominated	
San Diego Film Critics Society	December 14, 2011	Best Adapted Screenplay	Aaron Sorkin and Steven Zaillian	Won	
Satellite Awards	December 18, 2011	Best Film	Moneyball	Nominated	
Satellite Awards	December 18, 2011	Best Actor – Motion Picture	Brad Pitt	Nominated	
Satellite Awards	December 18, 2011	Best Supporting Actor – Motion Picture	Jonah Hill	Nominated	
Satellite Awards	December 18, 2011	Best Adapted Screenplay	Aaron Sorkin and Steven Zaillian	Nominated	
Screen Actors Guild Awards	January 29, 2012	Outstanding Performance by a Male Actor in a Leading Role	Brad Pitt	Nominated	
Screen Actors Guild Awards	January 29, 2012	Outstanding Performance by a Male Actor in a Supporting Role	Jonah Hill	Nominated	
St. Louis Film Critics Association	December 12, 2011	Best Actor	Brad Pitt	Nominated	
St. Louis Film Critics Association	December 12, 2011	Best Supporting Actor	Jonah Hill	Nominated	
St. Louis Film Critics Association	December 12, 2011	Best Adapted Screenplay	Aaron Sorkin and Steven Zaillian	Runner-up	
Toronto Film Critics Association	December 14, 2011	Best Screenplay	Aaron Sorkin and Steven Zaillian	Won	
USC Scripter Award	February 18, 2012	Best Screenplay	Stan Chervin, Aaron Sorkin and Steven Zaillian	Nominated	
Vancouver Film Critics Circle	January 10, 2012	Best Screenplay	Aaron Sorkin and Steven Zaillian	Nominated	
Village Voice Film Poll	December 21, 2011	Best Actor	Brad Pitt	5th place	
Village Voice Film Poll	December 21, 2011	Best Supporting Actor	Jonah Hill	13th place	
Village Voice Film Poll	December 21, 2011	Best Screenplay	Aaron Sorkin and Steven Zaillian	6th place	
Washington D.C. Area Film Critics Association	December 5, 2011	Best Actor	Brad Pitt	Nominated	
Washington D.C. Area Film Critics Association	December 5, 2011	Best Adapted Screenplay	Aaron Sorkin and Steven Zaillian	Nominated	
Writers Guild of America Award	February 19, 2012	Best Adapted Screenplay	Stan Chervin, Aaron Sorkin and Steven Zaillian	Nominated	

== See also ==
- 2011 in film
