= List of accolades received by My Week with Marilyn =

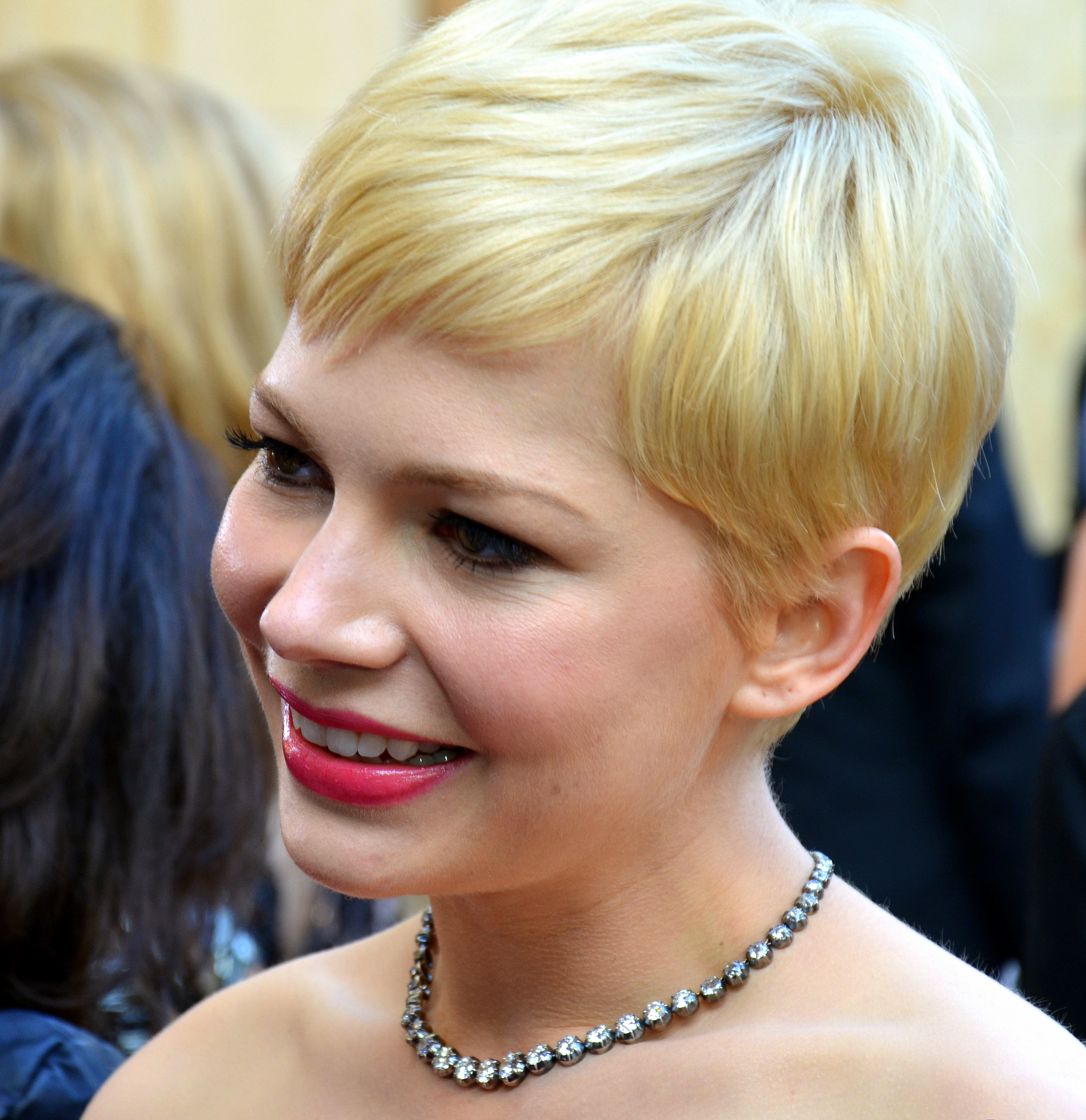
- Michelle Williams has received thirty-two nominations for her portrayal of Marilyn Monroe, winning the Golden Globe Award for Best Actress – Motion Picture Comedy or Musical
Awards and nominations
Award	Won	Nominated
AACTA Awards	0	1
Academy Awards	0	2
African-American Film Critics Association	0	1
Alliance of Women Film Journalists	0	2
American Cinema Editors	0	1
Boston Society of Film Critics	1	1
British Academy Film Awards	0	7
Broadcast Film Critics Association	0	4
Capri, Hollywood International Film Festival	1	1
Casting Society of America	1	1
Chicago Film Critics Association	1	2
Dallas–Fort Worth Film Critics Association	1	2
Detroit Film Critics Society	1	2
Empire Awards	0	1
Evening Standard British Film Awards	0	1
Florida Film Critics Circle	1	1
Golden Globe Awards	1	3
Golden Trailer Awards	0	3
Hollywood Film Awards	1	1
Houston Film Critics Society	0	1
Independent Spirit Awards	1	1
London Film Critics' Circle	1	2
MTV Movie & TV Awards	0	1
New York Film Critics Circle	0	1
Online Film Critics Society	0	1
Palm Springs International Film Festival	1	1
Park City Film Music Festival	1	1
San Diego Film Critics Society	0	1
Satellite Awards	0	2
Screen Actors Guild Awards	0	2
St. Louis Film Critics Association	0	2
Toronto Film Critics Association	1	1
Vancouver Film Critics Circle	0	2
Washington D.C. Area Film Critics Association	1	2
Women Film Critics Circle	0	1
- Total number of wins and nominations
Totals	15	59
- References

My Week with Marilyn is a 2011 British drama film directed by Simon Curtis and written by Adrian Hodges. The screenplay was adapted from two diary accounts by Colin Clark, which document his time on the set of the 1957 film The Prince and the Showgirl and the time he spent with Marilyn Monroe. Michelle Williams and Eddie Redmayne star as Monroe and Clark, respectively. My Week with Marilyn had its world premiere at the 49th New York Film Festival on 9 October 2011. The film then played at several film festivals including Mill Valley, Chicago and Philadelphia, Rome and Dubai. My Week with Marilyn was released on 23 November 2011 in the United States and two days later in the United Kingdom. As of May 2012, the film has earned over £20 million in its total worldwide gross at the box office.

The film has gathered various awards and nominations following its release, with most nominations recognising the film itself and the cast's acting performances, particularly those of Michelle Williams and Kenneth Branagh (who plays Laurence Olivier). Both actors received nominations at the 84th Academy Awards for Best Actress and Best Supporting Actor, respectively. The actors also received nominations from the Alliance of Women Film Journalists, while the film was nominated for Best Picture at the African-American Film Critics Association. My Week with Marilyn received four nominations from the Broadcast Film Critics Association, with two nominations coming in the Best Costume Design and Best Makeup categories. The British Academy Film Awards handed the film seven nominations, including Best British Film, Best Actress for Williams, Best Actress in a Supporting Role for Judi Dench, Best Costume Design and Best Makeup and Hair. The cast received the Capri Ensemble Cast Award from the Capri, Hollywood International Film Festival in January 2012.

Williams won the Chicago Film Critics Association Award for Best Actress, while Curtis earned a nomination for Most Promising Filmmaker. My Week with Marilyn and Branagh garnered nominations from the 69th Golden Globe Awards, while Williams won Best Actress in a Comedy or Musical Motion Picture. The actress also earned the Best Actress award from the Hollywood Film Festival. The London Film Critics' Circle awarded Kenneth Branagh the Supporting Actor of the Year accolade. Both Williams and Branagh gathered nominations at the Satellite Awards and the Screen Actors Guild Awards ceremonies. The Toronto Film Critics Association awarded Williams for her portrayal of Monroe. The film's casting crew, Deborah Aquila, Tricia Wood and Nina Gold earned a nomination for Outstanding Achievement in Casting – Feature – Studio or Independent Drama from the Casting Society of America.

== Awards and nominations ==
Award	Date of ceremony	Category	Recipients	Result
AACTA Awards	27 January 2012	Best International Actress	Michelle Williams	Nominated
Academy Awards	26 February 2012	Best Actress	Michelle Williams	Nominated
Academy Awards	26 February 2012	Best Supporting Actor	Kenneth Branagh	Nominated
African-American Film Critics Association	12 December 2011	Best Picture	My Week with Marilyn	Nominated
Alliance of Women Film Journalists	10 January 2012	Best Actress	Michelle Williams	Nominated
Alliance of Women Film Journalists	10 January 2012	Best Supporting Actor	Kenneth Branagh	Nominated
American Cinema Editors	18 February 2012	Best Edited Feature Film – Comedy or Musical	Adam Recht	Nominated
Boston Society of Film Critics	11 December 2011	Best Actress	Michelle Williams	Won
British Academy Film Awards	12 February 2012	Best Actress in a Leading Role	Michelle Williams	Nominated
British Academy Film Awards	12 February 2012	Best Actress in a Supporting Role	Judi Dench	Nominated
British Academy Film Awards	12 February 2012	Best Actor in a Supporting Role	Kenneth Branagh	Nominated
British Academy Film Awards	12 February 2012	Best British Film	My Week with Marilyn	Nominated
British Academy Film Awards	12 February 2012	Best Costume Design	Jill Taylor	Nominated
British Academy Film Awards	12 February 2012	Best Makeup and Hair	Jenny Shircore	Nominated
British Academy Film Awards	12 February 2012	Rising Star Award	Eddie Redmayne	Nominated
Broadcast Film Critics Association	12 January 2012	Best Actress	Michelle Williams	Nominated
Broadcast Film Critics Association	12 January 2012	Best Costume Design	Jill Taylor	Nominated
Broadcast Film Critics Association	12 January 2012	Best Makeup	Jenny Shircore	Nominated
Broadcast Film Critics Association	12 January 2012	Best Supporting Actor	Kenneth Branagh	Nominated
Capri, Hollywood International Film Festival	1 January 2012	Capri Ensemble Cast Award	My Week with Marilyn	Won
Casting Society of America	29 October 2012	Outstanding Achievement in Casting – Feature – Studio or Independent Drama	Deborah Aquila, Tricia Wood, Nina Gold	Won
Chicago Film Critics Association	19 December 2011	Best Actress	Michelle Williams	Won
Chicago Film Critics Association	19 December 2011	Most Promising Filmmaker	Simon Curtis	Nominated
Dallas–Fort Worth Film Critics Association	16 December 2011	Best Actress	Michelle Williams	Won
Dallas–Fort Worth Film Critics Association	16 December 2011	Best Supporting Actor	Kenneth Branagh	Nominated
Detroit Film Critics Society	16 December 2011	Best Actress	Michelle Williams	Won
Detroit Film Critics Society	16 December 2011	Best Supporting Actor	Kenneth Branagh	Nominated
Empire Awards	25 March 2012	Best Actress	Michelle Williams	Nominated
Evening Standard British Film Awards	6 February 2012	Best Actor	Kenneth Branagh	Nominated
Florida Film Critics Circle	19 December 2011	Best Actress	Michelle Williams	Won
Golden Globe Awards	15 January 2012	Best Actress – Motion Picture Comedy or Musical	Michelle Williams	Won
Golden Globe Awards	15 January 2012	Best Motion Picture – Musical or Comedy	My Week with Marilyn	Nominated
Golden Globe Awards	15 January 2012	Best Supporting Actor – Motion Picture	Kenneth Branagh	Nominated
Golden Trailer Awards	31 May 2012	Best Romance TV Spot	My Week with Marilyn	Nominated
Golden Trailer Awards	31 May 2012	Best Romance Poster	My Week with Marilyn "Version 1"	Nominated
Golden Trailer Awards	31 May 2012	Best Romance Poster	My Week with Marilyn "Version 2"	Nominated
Hollywood Film Awards	24 October 2011	Hollywood Actress Award	Michelle Williams	Won
Houston Film Critics Society	13 December 2011	Best Actress	Michelle Williams	Nominated
Independent Spirit Awards	25 February 2012	Best Female Lead	Michelle Williams	Won
London Film Critics' Circle	19 January 2012	Actress of the Year	Michelle Williams	Nominated
London Film Critics' Circle	19 January 2012	Supporting Actor of the Year	Kenneth Branagh	Won
MTV Movie & TV Awards	3 June 2012	Best On-Screen Transformation	Michelle Williams	Nominated
New York Film Critics Circle	29 November 2011	Best Actress	Michelle Williams	Nominated
Online Film Critics Society	2 January 2012	Best Actress	Michelle Williams	Nominated
Palm Springs International Film Festival	7 January 2012	Desert Palm Achievement Actress Award	Michelle Williams	Won
Park City Film Music Festival	3 June 2012	Distinguished Artist Award	Conrad Pope	Won
San Diego Film Critics Society	14 December 2011	Best Actress	Michelle Williams	Nominated
Satellite Awards	18 December 2011	Best Actress in a Motion Picture – Drama	Michelle Williams	Nominated
Satellite Awards	18 December 2011	Best Supporting Actor	Kenneth Branagh	Nominated
Screen Actors Guild Awards	29 January 2012	Outstanding Performance by a Female Actor in a Leading Role	Michelle Williams	Nominated
Screen Actors Guild Awards	29 January 2012	Outstanding Performance by a Male Actor in a Supporting Role	Kenneth Branagh	Nominated
St. Louis Film Critics Association	19 December 2011	Best Actress	Michelle Williams	Nominated
St. Louis Film Critics Association	19 December 2011	Best Picture	My Week with Marilyn	Nominated
Toronto Film Critics Association	10 January 2012	Best Actress	Michelle Williams	Won
Vancouver Film Critics Circle	9 January 2012	Best Actress	Michelle Williams	Nominated
Vancouver Film Critics Circle	9 January 2012	Best Supporting Actor	Kenneth Branagh	Nominated
Washington D.C. Area Film Critics Association	5 December 2011	Best Actress	Michelle Williams	Won
Washington D.C. Area Film Critics Association	5 December 2011	Best Supporting Actor	Kenneth Branagh	Nominated
Women Film Critics Circle	19 December 2011	Worst Female Images in a Movie	My Week with Marilyn	Nominated
