= List of accolades received by The Tree of Life (film) =

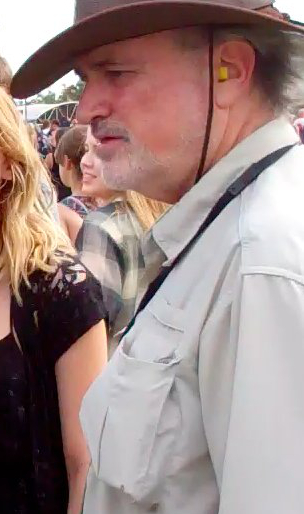
- Terrence Malick (pictured in 2011) received several awards and nominations for writing and directing the film.
Accolades
Award	Won	Nominated
AACTA Awards	0	2
AARP Annual Movies for Grownups Awards	0	1
Academy Awards	0	3
African-American Film Critics Association	1	1
Alliance of Women Film Journalists	1	4
American Film Institute	1	1
American Society of Cinematographers	1	1
Austin Film Critics Association	2	2
Australian Cinematographers Society	1	1
Australian Film Critics Association	1	1
Bodil Awards	0	1
Boston Society of Film Critics	1	1
Camerimage	0	1
Cannes Film Festival	1	1
Chicago Film Critics Association	4	7
Critics' Choice Movie Awards	1	5
Dallas–Fort Worth Film Critics Association	1	3
David di Donatello	0	1
Detroit Film Critics Society	1	3
Dorian Awards	0	1
Dublin Film Critics' Circle	2	4
Florida Film Critics Circle	1	1
Gold Derby Awards	2	5
Golden Schmoes Awards	1	3
Gotham Awards	1	1
Hollywood Film Awards	2	2
Houston Film Critics Society	1	3
IndieWire Critic's Poll	3	3
Jupiter Award	0	1
London Film Critics' Circle	0	2
Los Angeles Film Critics Association	3	4
Motion Picture Sound Editors	0	1
Movieguide Awards	0	3
Nastro d'Argento	0	1
National Board of Review	1	1
National Society of Film Critics	4	5
New York Film Critics Circle	3	3
New York Film Critics Online	3	3
Online Film Critics Society	6	8
Palm Springs International Film Festival	2	2
Russian Guild of Film Critics	0	1
San Diego Film Critics Society	1	6
San Francisco Film Critics Circle	3	3
San Sebastián International Film Festival	1	1
Satellite Awards	2	4
St. Louis Film Critics Association	1	7
Sydney Film Festival	0	1
Toronto Film Critics Association	2	4
Vancouver Film Critics Circle	2	3
Village Voice Film Poll	2	6
Washington D.C. Area Film Critics Association	1	2
World Soundtrack Academy	1	1
- Total number of wins and nominations
Totals	68	140
- References

The Tree of Life is a 2011 American drama film written and directed by Terrence Malick. The film stars Brad Pitt, who also co-produced the film, Sean Penn, and Jessica Chastain. It explores the origin and meaning of life through the childhood memories of a middle-aged architect, Jack O'Brien (Penn). Jack questions his faith and seeks to find the purpose to his existence, while reconciling with his domineering father (Pitt); he however shares a gentle relationship with his mother (Chastain). The film's music was composed by Alexandre Desplat, and Emmanuel Lubezki served as the cinematographer.

Made on a budget of $32 million, The Tree of Life premiered at the 2011 Cannes Film Festival on May 16, 2011, where it was initially met with polarized reviews from critics. The film had its theatrical release on May 27, 2011, and earned over $54 million worldwide. Rotten Tomatoes, a review aggregator, surveyed 272 reviews and judged 85% to be positive. The film was nominated for 140 awards, winning 68; its direction, screenplay, cinematography, editing, visual effects, and music, as well as the performances of Pitt and Chastain, received the most attention from award groups.

The Tree of Life won the Palme d'Or at the Cannes Film Festival, becoming the first film from the United States to do so since Michael Moore's documentary film, Fahrenheit 9/11 (2004). At the 84th Academy Awards, the film received three nominations—Best Picture, Best Director for Malick, and Best Cinematography for Lubezki. The film earned four nominations at the 16th Satellite Awards: Best Supporting Actress – Motion Picture for Chastain, Best Original Screenplay for Malick, Best Cinematography for Lubezki, and Best Sound; it won for supporting actress and cinematography. The film was awarded Best Picture by the African-American Film Critics Association, Chicago Film Critics Association, Online Film Critics Society, San Francisco Film Critics Circle, and Toronto Film Critics Association. The American Film Institute, Dallas–Fort Worth Film Critics Association, IndieWire Critic's Poll, and Village Voice Film Poll included The Tree of Life in their listing of the year's ten best films.

== Awards and nominations ==
Award	Date of ceremony (Note: Each date is linked to the article about the awards held that year, wherever possible.)	Category	Recipient(s)	Result	Ref(s)
AACTA Awards	January 27, 2012	Best Film – International	Dede Gardner, Sarah Green, Grant Hill and Bill Pohlad	Nominated	
AACTA Awards	January 27, 2012	Best Direction – International	Terrence Malick	Nominated	
AARP Annual Movies for Grownups Awards	February 6, 2012	Best Director	Terrence Malick	Nominated	
Academy Awards	February 26, 2012	Best Picture	Dede Gardner, Sarah Green, Grant Hill and Bill Pohlad	Nominated	
Academy Awards	February 26, 2012	Best Director	Terrence Malick	Nominated	
Academy Awards	February 26, 2012	Best Cinematography	Emmanuel Lubezki	Nominated	
African-American Film Critics Association	December 12, 2011	Best Picture	The Tree of Life	Won	
Alliance of Women Film Journalists	January 10, 2012	Best Director	Terrence Malick	Nominated	
Alliance of Women Film Journalists	January 10, 2012	Best Editing	Hank Corwin, Jay Rabinowitz, Daniel Rezende, Billy Weber and Mark Yoshikawa	Nominated	
Alliance of Women Film Journalists	January 10, 2012	Best Cinematography	Emmanuel Lubezki	Won	
Alliance of Women Film Journalists	January 10, 2012	Best Breakthrough Performance	Jessica Chastain	Nominated	
American Film Institute	December 11, 2011	AFI Movies of the Year	The Tree of Life	Won	
American Society of Cinematographers	February 12, 2012	Outstanding Achievement in Cinematography in Theatrical Releases	Emmanuel Lubezki	Won	
Austin Film Critics Association	December 28, 2011	Best Cinematography	Emmanuel Lubezki	Won	
Austin Film Critics Association	December 28, 2011	Bobby McCurdy Breakthrough Artist Award	Jessica Chastain (Note: Chastain also won the award for Coriolanus, The Debt, The Help, Take Shelter, and Texas Killing Fields.)	Won	
Australian Cinematographers Society	May 5, 2012	Best Cinematography	Emmanuel Lubezki	Won	
Australian Film Critics Association	February 15, 2012	Best Overseas Film (English Language)	The Tree of Life	Won	
Bodil Awards	March 3, 2012	Best American Film	The Tree of Life	Nominated	
Boston Society of Film Critics	December 11, 2011	Best Cinematography	Emmanuel Lubezki	Won	
Camerimage	December 3, 2012	Main Competition	Emmanuel Lubezki	Nominated	
Cannes Film Festival	May 11 – 22, 2011	Palme d'Or	The Tree of Life	Won	
Chicago Film Critics Association	January 7, 2012	Best Film	The Tree of Life	Won	
Chicago Film Critics Association	January 7, 2012	Best Director	Terrence Malick	Won	
Chicago Film Critics Association	January 7, 2012	Best Original Screenplay	Terrence Malick	Nominated	
Chicago Film Critics Association	January 7, 2012	Best Supporting Actor	Brad Pitt	Nominated	
Chicago Film Critics Association	January 7, 2012	Best Supporting Actress	Jessica Chastain	Won	
Chicago Film Critics Association	January 7, 2012	Best Cinematography	Emmanuel Lubezki	Won	
Chicago Film Critics Association	January 7, 2012	Most Promising Newcomer	Hunter McCracken	Nominated	
Critics' Choice Movie Awards	January 12, 2012	Best Picture	The Tree of Life	Nominated	
Critics' Choice Movie Awards	January 12, 2012	Best Cinematography	Emmanuel Lubezki	Won	
Critics' Choice Movie Awards	January 12, 2012	Best Art Direction	David Crank and Jack Fisk	Nominated	
Critics' Choice Movie Awards	January 12, 2012	Best Sound	The Tree of Life	Nominated	
Critics' Choice Movie Awards	January 12, 2012	Best Visual Effects	The Tree of Life	Nominated	
Dallas–Fort Worth Film Critics Association	December 16, 2011	Best Film	The Tree of Life	5th Place	
Dallas–Fort Worth Film Critics Association	December 16, 2011	Best Director	Terrence Malick	3rd Place	
Dallas–Fort Worth Film Critics Association	December 16, 2011	Best Cinematography	Emmanuel Lubezki	Won	
David di Donatello	May 4, 2012	Best Foreign Film	The Tree of Life	Nominated	
Detroit Film Critics Society	December 16, 2011	Best Film	The Tree of Life	Nominated	
Detroit Film Critics Society	December 16, 2011	Best Director	Terrence Malick	Nominated	
Detroit Film Critics Society	December 16, 2011	Breakthrough Performance	Jessica Chastain (Note: Chastain also won the award for The Help and Take Shelter.)	Won	
Dorian Awards	January 18, 2012	Film of the Year	The Tree of Life	Nominated	
Dublin Film Critics' Circle	December 23, 2011	Best Film	The Tree of Life	3rd place	
Dublin Film Critics' Circle	December 23, 2011	Best Director	Terrence Malick	2nd place	
Dublin Film Critics' Circle	December 23, 2011	Best Actress	Jessica Chastain	Won	
Dublin Film Critics' Circle	December 23, 2011	International Breakthrough Award	Jessica Chastain	Won	
Florida Film Critics Circle	December 19, 2011	Best Cinematography	Emmanuel Lubezki	Won	
Gold Derby Awards	February 25, 2012	Best Director	Terrence Malick	Won	
Gold Derby Awards	February 25, 2012	Best Supporting Actor	Brad Pitt	Nominated	
Gold Derby Awards	February 25, 2012	Best Cinematography	Emmanuel Lubezki	Won	
Gold Derby Awards	February 25, 2012	Best Film Editing	Hank Corwin, Jay Rabinowitz, Daniel Rezende, Billy Weber and Mark Yoshikawa	Nominated	
Gold Derby Awards	February 25, 2012	Best Visual Effects	Bradley J. Friedman, Don Glass, Bryan Hirota, Paul Riddle and Michael Shand	Nominated	
Golden Schmoes Awards	February 24, 2012	Trippiest of the Year	The Tree of Life	Won	
Golden Schmoes Awards	February 24, 2012	Favorite Movie Poster of the Year	The Tree of Life	Nominated	
Golden Schmoes Awards	February 24, 2012	Best Trailer of the Year	The Tree of Life	Nominated	
Gotham Awards	November 28, 2011	Best Feature	The Tree of Life (Note: Tied with Beginners (2010).)	Won	
Hollywood Film Awards	October 24, 2011	Best Cinematographer	Emmanuel Lubezki	Won	
Hollywood Film Awards	October 24, 2011	Breakthrough Actress Award	Jessica Chastain (Note: Chastain also won the award for Coriolanus, The Debt, The Help, and Take Shelter.)	Won	
Houston Film Critics Society	December 14, 2011	Best Picture	The Tree of Life	Nominated	
Houston Film Critics Society	December 14, 2011	Best Director	Terrence Malick	Nominated	
Houston Film Critics Society	December 14, 2011	Best Cinematography	Emmanuel Lubezki	Won	
IndieWire Critic's Poll	December 19, 2011	Best Film	The Tree of Life	Won	
IndieWire Critic's Poll	December 19, 2011	Best Director	Terrence Malick	Won	
IndieWire Critic's Poll	December 19, 2011	Best Cinematography	Emmanuel Lubezki	Won	
Jupiter Award	March 29, 2012	Best International Actor	Brad Pitt	Nominated	
London Film Critics' Circle	January 19, 2012	Film of the Year	The Tree of Life	Nominated	
London Film Critics' Circle	January 19, 2012	Director of the Year	Terrence Malick	Nominated	
Los Angeles Film Critics Association	December 11, 2011	Best Film	The Tree of Life	Runner-up	
Los Angeles Film Critics Association	December 11, 2011	Best Director	Terrence Malick	Won	
Los Angeles Film Critics Association	December 11, 2011	Best Supporting Actress	Jessica Chastain	Won	
Los Angeles Film Critics Association	December 11, 2011	Best Cinematography	Emmanuel Lubezki	Won	
Motion Picture Sound Editors	February 19, 2012	Best Sound Editing: Music in a Feature Film	The Tree of Life	Nominated	
Movieguide Awards	February 10, 2012	Epiphany Prize for Most Inspiring Movie of 2011	The Tree of Life	Nominated	
Movieguide Awards	February 10, 2012	The Grace Award for Most Inspiring Performance in Movies in 2011	Jessica Chastain	Nominated	
Movieguide Awards	February 10, 2012	The Ten Best 2011 Movies for Mature Audiences	The Tree of Life	5th place	
Nastro d'Argento	June 30, 2012	Nastro d'Argento for Best Extraeuropean Film	The Tree of Life	Nominated	
National Board of Review	December 1, 2011	Top Ten Films	The Tree of Life	Won	
National Society of Film Critics Awards	January 7, 2012	Best Film	The Tree of Life	Runner-up	
National Society of Film Critics Awards	January 7, 2012	Best Director	Terrence Malick	Won	
National Society of Film Critics Awards	January 7, 2012	Best Actor	Brad Pitt (Note: Pitt also won the award for Moneyball.)	Won	
National Society of Film Critics Awards	January 7, 2012	Best Supporting Actress	Jessica Chastain	Won	
National Society of Film Critics Awards	January 7, 2012	Best Cinematography	Emmanuel Lubezki	Won	
New York Film Critics Circle	November 29, 2011	Best Actor	Brad Pitt	Won	
New York Film Critics Circle	November 29, 2011	Best Supporting Actress	Jessica Chastain	Won	
New York Film Critics Circle	November 29, 2011	Best Cinematographer	Emmanuel Lubezki	Won	
New York Film Critics Online	December 11, 2011	Top 10 Films	The Tree of Life	Won	
New York Film Critics Online	December 11, 2011	Breakthrough Performer	Jessica Chastain (Note: Chastain also won the award for The Debt, The Help, and Take Shelter.)	Won	
New York Film Critics Online	December 11, 2011	Best Cinematography	Emmanuel Lubezki	Won	
Online Film Critics Society	January 2, 2012	Best Picture	The Tree of Life	Won	
Online Film Critics Society	January 2, 2012	Best Director	Terrence Malick	Won	
Online Film Critics Society	January 2, 2012	Best Supporting Actor	Brad Pitt	Nominated	
Online Film Critics Society	January 2, 2012	Best Supporting Actress	Jessica Chastain	Won	
Online Film Critics Society	January 2, 2012	Best Original Screenplay	Terrence Malick	Nominated	
Online Film Critics Society	January 2, 2012	Best Cinematography	Emmanuel Lubezki	Won	
Online Film Critics Society	January 2, 2012	Best Editing	Hank Corwin, Jay Rabinowitz, Daniel Rezende, Billy Weber and Mark Yoshikawa	Won	
Online Film Critics Society	January 2, 2012	Best Breakthrough Performance	Jessica Chastain	Won	
Palm Springs International Film Festival	January 7, 2012	Desert Palm Achievement Award for Acting	Brad Pitt	Won	
Palm Springs International Film Festival	January 7, 2012	Spotlight Award	Jessica Chastain	Won	
Russian Guild of Film Critics	December 22, 2011	Best Foreign Film	The Tree of Life	Nominated	
San Diego Film Critics Society	December 14, 2011	Best Film	The Tree of Life	Nominated	
San Diego Film Critics Society	December 14, 2011	Best Director	Terrence Malick	Nominated	
San Diego Film Critics Society	December 14, 2011	Best Cinematography	Emmanuel Lubezki	Won	
San Diego Film Critics Society	December 14, 2011	Best Editing	Hank Corwin, Jay Rabinowitz, Daniel Rezende, Billy Weber and Mark Yoshikawa	Nominated	
San Diego Film Critics Society	December 14, 2011	Best Production Design	David Crank and Jack Fisk	Nominated	
San Diego Film Critics Society	December 14, 2011	Best Original Score	Alexandre Desplat	Nominated	
San Francisco Film Critics Circle	December 11, 2011	Best Picture	The Tree of Life	Won	
San Francisco Film Critics Circle	December 11, 2011	Best Director	Terrence Malick	Won	
San Francisco Film Critics Circle	December 11, 2011	Best Cinematography	Emmanuel Lubezki	Won	
San Sebastián International Film Festival	September 16 – 24, 2011	FIPRESCI Grand Prix for Best Film	Terrence Malick	Won	
Satellite Awards	December 18, 2011	Best Supporting Actress – Motion Picture	Jessica Chastain	Won	
Satellite Awards	December 18, 2011	Best Original Screenplay	Terrence Malick	Won	
Satellite Awards	December 18, 2011	Best Cinematography	Emmanuel Lubezki	Nominated	
Satellite Awards	December 18, 2011	Best Sound	The Tree of Life	Nominated	
St. Louis Film Critics Association	December 12, 2011	Best Film	The Tree of Life	Nominated	
St. Louis Film Critics Association	December 12, 2011	Best Director	Terrence Malick	Runner-up	
St. Louis Film Critics Association	December 12, 2011	Best Supporting Actress	Jessica Chastain	Nominated	
St. Louis Film Critics Association	December 12, 2011	Best Original Screenplay	Terrence Malick	Nominated	
St. Louis Film Critics Association	December 12, 2011	Best Cinematography	Emmanuel Lubezki	Won	
St. Louis Film Critics Association	December 12, 2011	Best Music	Alexandre Desplat	Nominated	
St. Louis Film Critics Association	December 12, 2011	Best Visual Effects	The Tree of Life	Nominated	
Sydney Film Festival	June 8 – 19, 2011	Sydney Film Prize	The Tree of Life	Nominated	
Toronto Film Critics Association	December 14, 2011	Best Film	The Tree of Life	Won	
Toronto Film Critics Association	December 14, 2011	Best Director	Terrence Malick	Won	
Toronto Film Critics Association	December 14, 2011	Best Screenplay	Terrence Malick (Note: Tied with Alexander Payne, Nat Faxon, and Jim Rash for The Descendants.)	Runner-up	
Toronto Film Critics Association	December 14, 2011	Best Supporting Actress	Jessica Chastain (Note: Tied with Shailene Woodley for The Descendants.)	Runner-up	
Vancouver Film Critics Circle	January 10, 2012	Best Film	The Tree of Life	Nominated	
Vancouver Film Critics Circle	January 10, 2012	Best Director	Terrence Malick	Won	
Vancouver Film Critics Circle	January 10, 2012	Best Supporting Actress	Jessica Chastain	Won	
Village Voice Film Poll	December 21, 2011	Best Film	The Tree of Life	Won	
Village Voice Film Poll	December 21, 2011	Best Director	Terrence Malick	Won	
Village Voice Film Poll	December 21, 2011	Best Actor	Brad Pitt	7th place	
Village Voice Film Poll	December 21, 2011	Best Supporting Actor	Brad Pitt	4th place	
Village Voice Film Poll	December 21, 2011	Best Supporting Actress	Jessica Chastain	8th place	
Village Voice Film Poll	December 21, 2011	Best Screenplay	Terrence Malick	24th place	
Washington D.C. Area Film Critics Association	December 5, 2011	Best Art Direction	David Crank and Jack Fisk	Nominated	
Washington D.C. Area Film Critics Association	December 5, 2011	Best Cinematography	Emmanuel Lubezki	Won	
World Soundtrack Academy	October 20, 2012	Soundtrack Composer of the Year	Alexandre Desplat	Won	
