= AACTA International Award for Best Screenplay =

Australian film award

Best Screenplay AACTA International Award
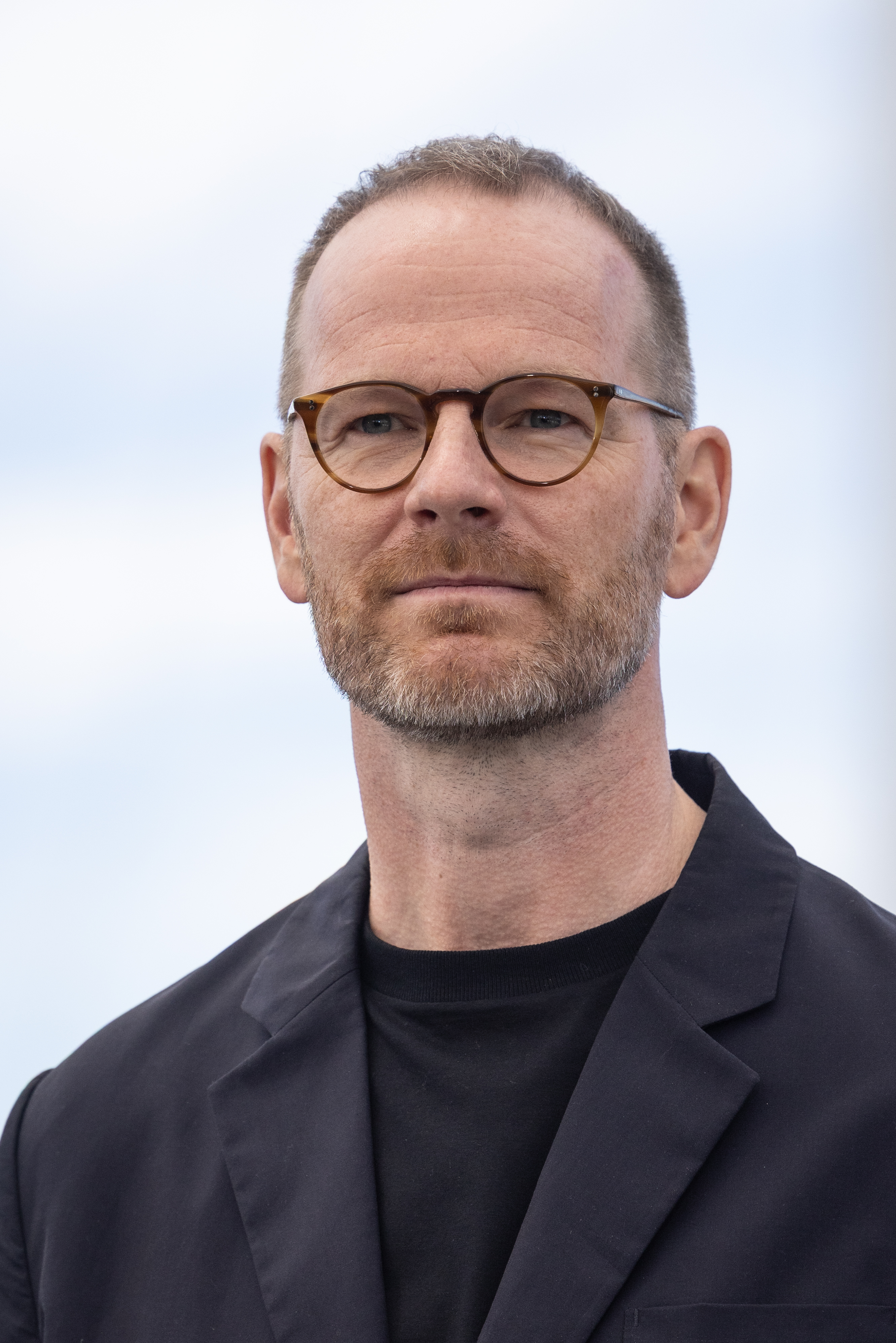
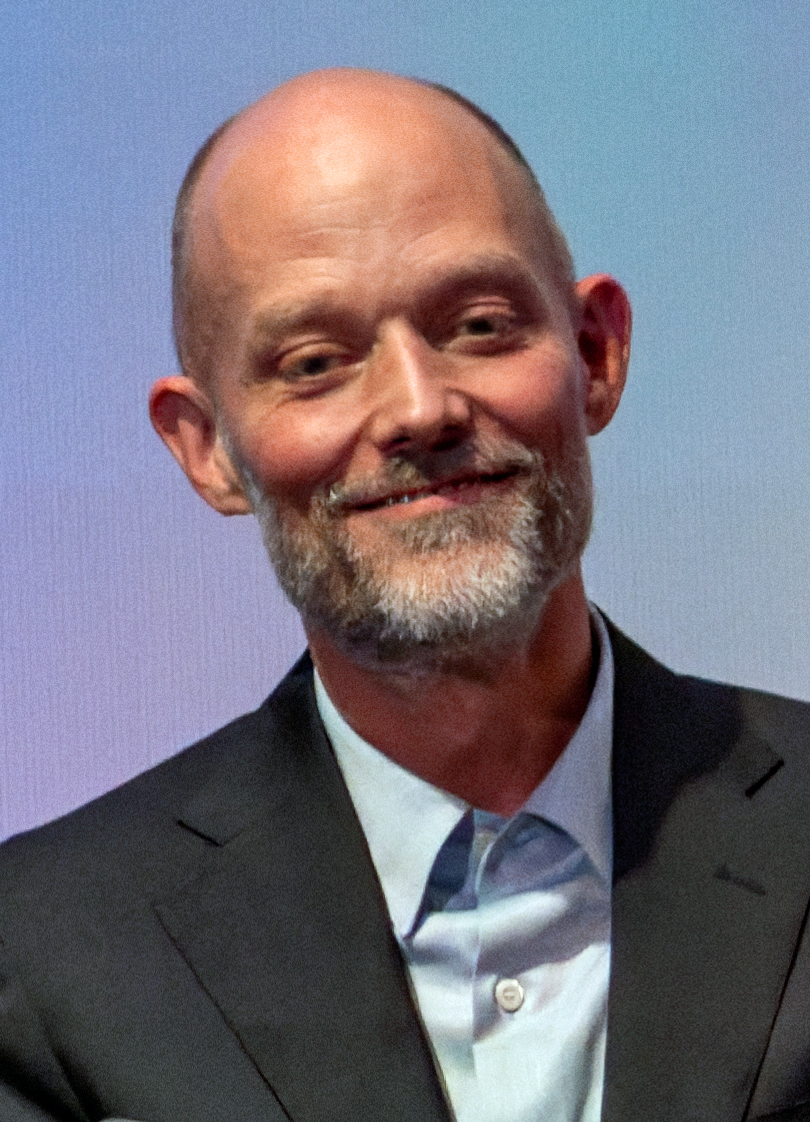
- Country: Australia
- Presented by: Australian Academy of Cinema and Television Arts (AACTA)
- First award: 2012
- Currently held by: Joachim Trier and Eskil Vogt, Sentimental Value (2025)
- Website: http://www.aacta.org

The AACTA International Award for Best Screenplay is an accolade given by the Australian Academy of Cinema and Television Arts (AACTA), a non-profit organisation whose aim is to "identify, award, promote, and celebrate Australia's greatest achievements in film and television". The award is presented at the annual AACTA International Awards, which rewards achievements in feature films, regardless of the country the film was made. The winners and nominees are determined by the international chapter of the academy, which comprises eighty members of Australian filmmakers and executives.

The prize was first handed out at the 1st AACTA International Awards presentation, and awarded jointly to George Clooney, Grant Heslov, and Beau Willimon for The Ides of March, and to J. C. Chandor for Margin Call.

== Winners and nominees ==
In the following table, the winner is marked in a separate colour, and highlighted in boldface; the nominees are those that are not highlighted or in boldface.

=== 2010s ===
Year	Film	Screenwriter(s)
**2011** (1st)
**2011** (1st)	**The Ides of March**	**George Clooney, Grant Heslov and Beau Willimon**
**2011** (1st)	**Margin Call**	**J. C. Chandor**
**2011** (1st)	The Artist	Michel Hazanavicius
**2011** (1st)	The Descendants	Alexander Payne, Nat Faxon and Jim Rash
**2011** (1st)	Melancholia	Lars von Trier
**2011** (1st)	Midnight in Paris	Woody Allen
**2011** (1st)	Moneyball	Steven Zaillian, Aaron Sorkin and Stan Chervin
**2011** (1st)	We Need to Talk About Kevin	Lynne Ramsay and Rory Kinnear
**2012** (2nd)
**2012** (2nd)	**Django Unchained**	**Quentin Tarantino**
**2012** (2nd)	Argo	Chris Terrio
**2012** (2nd)	Lincoln	Tony Kushner
**2012** (2nd)	The Master	Paul Thomas Anderson
**2012** (2nd)	Silver Linings Playbook	David O. Russell
**2012** (2nd)	Zero Dark Thirty	Mark Boal
**2013** (3rd)
**2013** (3rd)	**American Hustle**	**Eric Warren Singer and David O. Russell**
**2013** (3rd)	12 Years a Slave	John Ridley
**2013** (3rd)	Blue Jasmine	Woody Allen
**2013** (3rd)	Inside Llewyn Davis	Joel and Ethan Coen
**2013** (3rd)	Saving Mr. Banks	Kelly Marcel and Sue Smith
**2014** (4th)
**2014** (4th)	**Birdman or (The Unexpected Virtue of Ignorance)**	**Alejandro G. Iñárritu, Nicolás Giacobone, Alexander Dinelaris, Jr. and Armando Bo**
**2014** (4th)	Boyhood	Richard Linklater
**2014** (4th)	The Grand Budapest Hotel	Wes Anderson
**2014** (4th)	The Imitation Game	Graham Moore
**2014** (4th)	Whiplash	Damien Chazelle
**2015** (5th)
**2015** (5th)	**Spotlight**	**Tom McCarthy and Josh Singer**
**2015** (5th)	Carol	Phyllis Nagy
**2015** (5th)	Ex Machina	Alex Garland
**2015** (5th)	The Martian	Drew Goddard
**2015** (5th)	Steve Jobs	Aaron Sorkin
**2016** (6th)
**2016** (6th)	**Manchester by the Sea**	**Kenneth Lonergan**
**2016** (6th)	Hacksaw Ridge	Andrew Knight and Robert Schenkkan
**2016** (6th)	Hell or High Water	Taylor Sheridan
**2016** (6th)	La La Land	Damien Chazelle
**2016** (6th)	Lion	Luke Davies
**2017** (7th)
**2017** (7th)	**Three Billboards Outside Ebbing, Missouri**	**Martin McDonagh**
**2017** (7th)	Call Me by Your Name	James Ivory
**2017** (7th)	Dunkirk	Christopher Nolan
**2017** (7th)	Get Out	Jordan Peele
**2017** (7th)	Lady Bird	Greta Gerwig
**2018** (8th)
**2018** (8th)	**The Favourite**	**Deborah Davis and Tony McNamara**
**2018** (8th)	BlacKkKlansman	Spike Lee, David Rabinowitz, Charlie Wachtel and Kevin Willmott
**2018** (8th)	Bohemian Rhapsody	Anthony McCarten
**2018** (8th)	A Quiet Place	Scott Beck, John Krasinski and Bryan Woods
**2018** (8th)	Roma	Alfonso Cuarón
**2019** (9th)
**2019** (9th)	**Jojo Rabbit**	**Taika Waititi**
**2019** (9th)	The Irishman	Steven Zaillian
**2019** (9th)	Joker	Todd Phillips and Scott Silver
**2019** (9th)	Once Upon a Time in Hollywood	Quentin Tarantino
**2019** (9th)	Parasite	Bong Joon-ho and Han Jin-won

=== 2020s ===
Year	Film	Screenwriter(s)
**2020** (10th)
**2020** (10th)	**The Trial of the Chicago 7**	**Aaron Sorkin**
**2020** (10th)	The Father	Florian Zeller and Christopher Hampton
**2020** (10th)	Mank	Jack Fincher
**2020** (10th)	Nomadland	Chloé Zhao
**2020** (10th)	Promising Young Woman	Emerald Fennell
**2021** (11th)
**2021** (11th)	**Being the Ricardos**	**Aaron Sorkin**
**2021** (11th)	Belfast	Kenneth Branagh
**2021** (11th)	Licorice Pizza	Paul Thomas Anderson
**2021** (11th)	Nitram	Shaun Grant
**2021** (11th)	The Power of the Dog	Jane Campion
**2022** (12th)
**2022** (12th)	**The Banshees of Inisherin**	**Martin McDonagh**
**2022** (12th)	Glass Onion: A Knives Out Mystery	Rian Johnson
**2022** (12th)	Tár	Todd Field
**2022** (12th)	Triangle of Sadness	Ruben Östlund
**2022** (12th)	The Woman King	Dana Stevens and Maria Bello
**2023** (13th)
**2023** (13th)	**Poor Things**	**Tony McNamara**
**2023** (13th)	American Fiction	Cord Jefferson
**2023** (13th)	Barbie	Greta Gerwig and Noah Baumbach
**2023** (13th)	Maestro	Bradley Cooper and Josh Singer
**2023** (13th)	Oppenheimer	Christopher Nolan
**2024** (14th)
**2024** (14th)	**A Real Pain**	**Jesse Eisenberg**
**2024** (14th)	Anora	Sean Baker
**2024** (14th)	Better Man	Michael Gracey, Oliver Cole and Simon Gleeson
**2024** (14th)	The Brutalist	Brady Corbet and Mona Fastvold
**2024** (14th)	Conclave	Peter Straughan
**2025** (15th)
**2025** (15th)	**Sentimental Value**	**Joachim Trier and Eskil Vogt**
**2025** (15th)	A House of Dynamite	Noah Oppenheim
**2025** (15th)	Hamnet	Maggie O'Farrell and Chloé Zhao
**2025** (15th)	Marty Supreme	Ronald Bronstein and Josh Safdie
**2025** (15th)	One Battle After Another	Paul Thomas Anderson

== See also ==
- AACTA Awards
- AACTA Award for Best Original Screenplay
- AACTA Award for Best Adapted Screenplay
