= 15th Hollywood Film Awards =

US film awards ceremony in 2011

- Location: Beverly Hills, California
- Founded: 1997
- Festival date: October 24, 2011
- Website: www.hollywoodawards.com

The 15th Hollywood Film Awards were held on October 24, 2011. The ceremony took place at The Beverly Hilton Hotel in Beverly Hills, California.

== Winners ==
- Best Actor: George Clooney – The Descendants
- Best Actress: Michelle Williams – My Week with Marilyn
- Best Supporting Actor: Christopher Plummer – Beginners
- Best Supporting Actress: Carey Mulligan – Shame
- Breakthrough Actor Award: Joseph Gordon-Levitt – 50/50
- Breakthrough Actress Award: Jessica Chastain – The Tree of Life, Take Shelter, The Help, The Debt, and Coriolanus
- Breakthrough Director: Michel Hazanavicius – The Artist
- Best Director: Bennett Miller – Moneyball
- Best Producer: Letty Aronson – Midnight in Paris
- Best Editor: Stephen Mirrione – The Ides of March
- Best Screenwriter: Diablo Cody – Young Adult
- Best Composer: Alberto Iglesias – The Skin I Live In
- Best Visual Effects: Scott Farrar – Transformers: Dark Side of the Moon
- Best Cinematographer: Emmanuel Lubezki – The Tree of Life
- Best Animation: Gore Verbinski – Rango
- Best Production Design: James J. Murakami – Heareafter
- Best Movie: Harry Potter and the Deathly Hallows – Part 2
- New Hollywood Award: Felicity Jones
- Career Achievement Award: Glenn Close
- Best Ensemble Cast: Viola Davis, Jessica Chastain, Emma Stone, Octavia Spencer, Allison Janney, Bryce Dallas Howard, Mary Steenburgen, Ahna O'Reilly, and Cicely Tyson – The Help
- Spotlight Award: Amber Heard – The Rum Diary, Bérénice Bejo – The Artist, Elle Fanning – Super 8, Jean Dujardin – The Artist, Andrea Riseborough – W.E., Anton Yelchin – Like Crazy, Shailene Woodley – The Descendants
