= 18th Screen Actors Guild Awards =

- Awarded for: Outstanding motion picture and primetime television performances
- Date: January 29, 2012
- Location: Shrine Auditorium; Los Angeles, California
- Country: United States
- Presented by: Screen Actors Guild
- Website: www.sagawards.org

Television/radio coverage
- Network: TNT and TBS simultaneous broadcast

The 18th Annual Screen Actors Guild Awards, honoring the best achievements in film and television performances for the year 2011, were presented on January 29, 2012, at the Shrine Exposition Center in Los Angeles, California, for the sixteenth consecutive year. It was broadcast simultaneously by TNT and TBS.

The nominees were announced on December 14, 2011, by actresses Regina King and Judy Greer at Los Angeles' Pacific Design Center's Silver Screen Theater.

== Winners and nominees ==
Winners are listed first and highlighted in boldface.

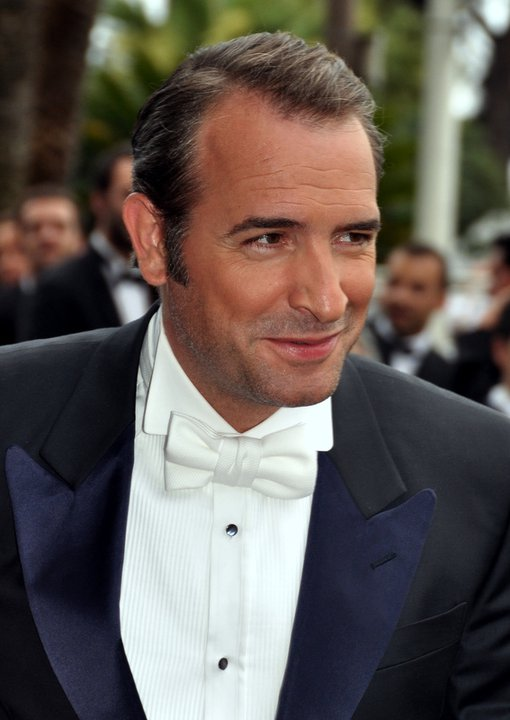
Jean Dujardin, Outstanding Performance by a Male Actor in a Leading Role winner

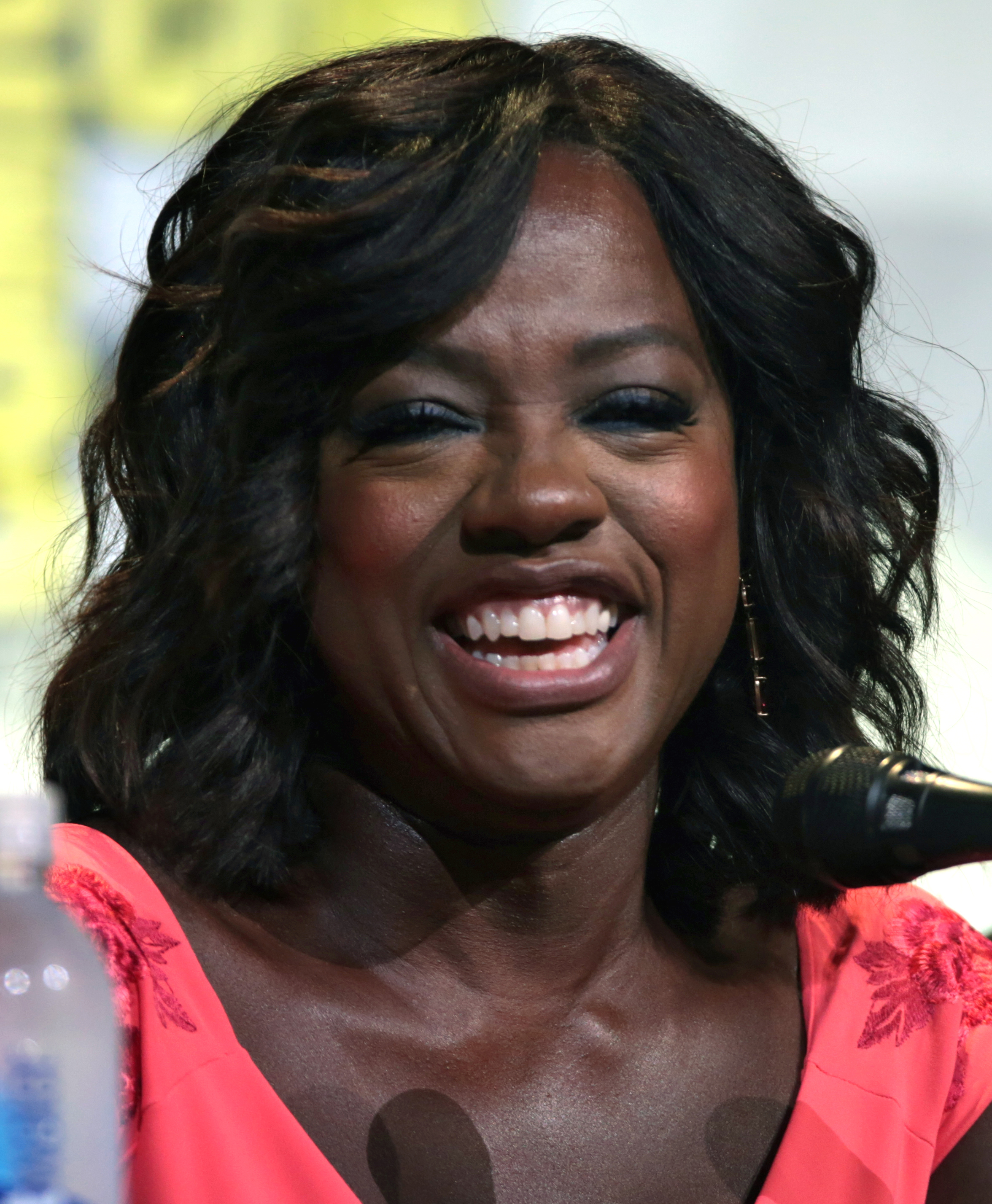
Viola Davis, Outstanding Performance by a Female Actor in a Leading Role winner

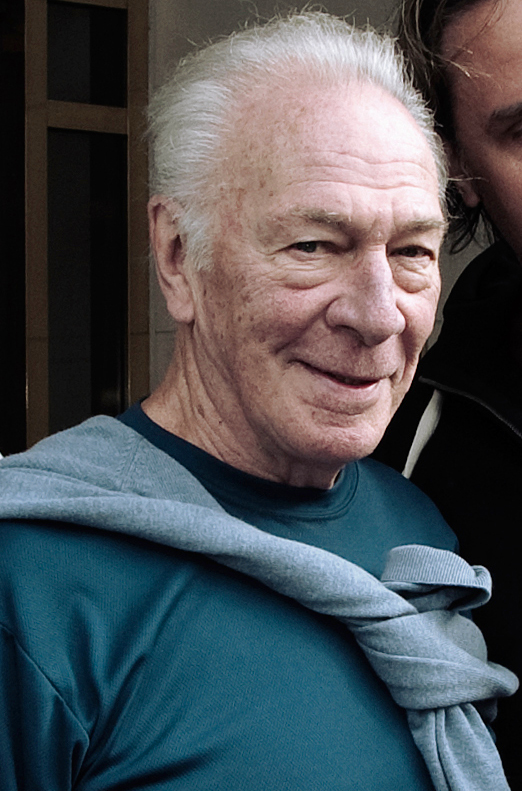
Christopher Plummer, Outstanding Performance by a Male Actor in a Supporting Role winner

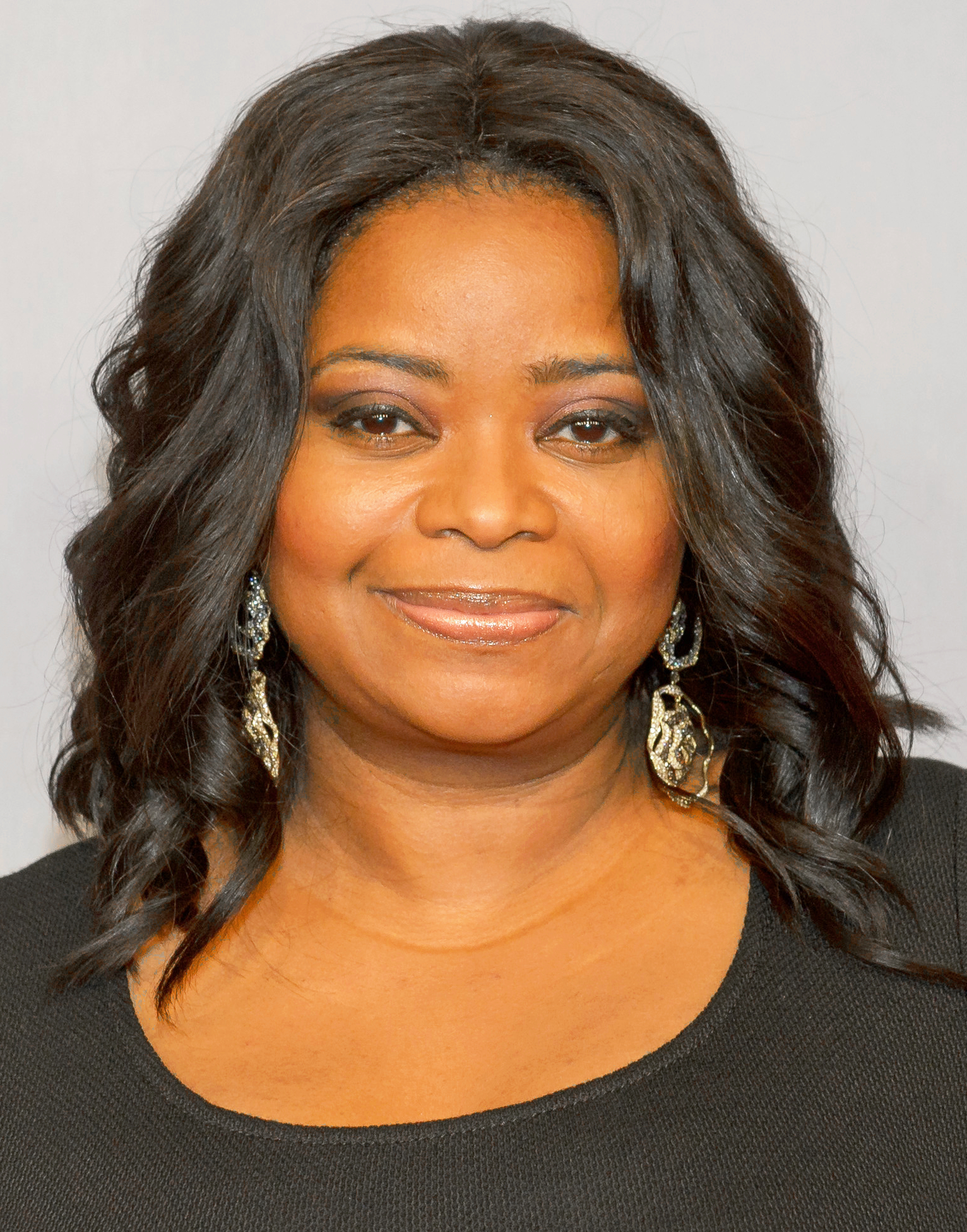
Octavia Spencer, Outstanding Performance by a Female Actor in a Supporting Role winner

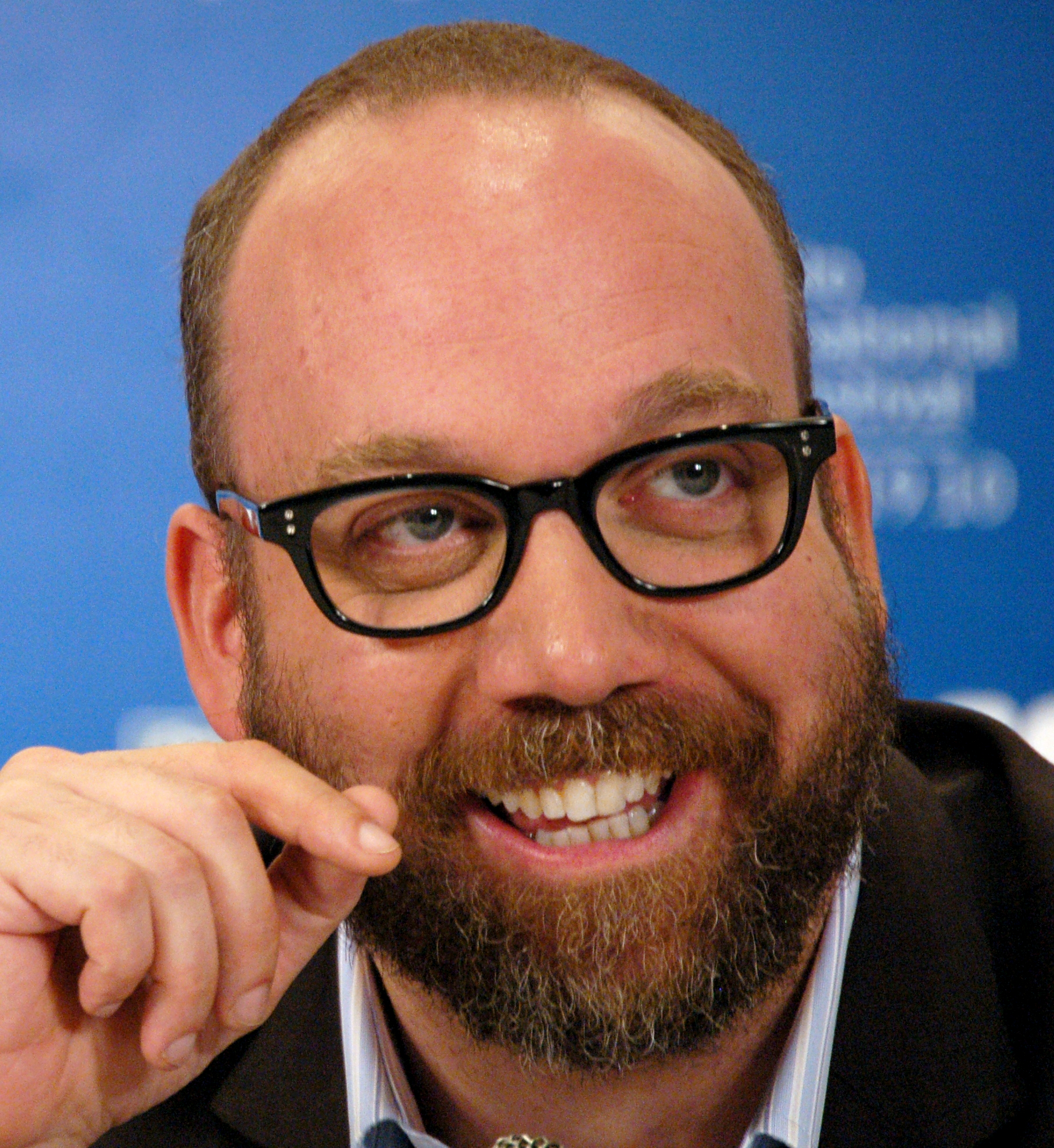
Paul Giamatti, Outstanding Performance by a Male Actor in a Miniseries or Television Movie winner

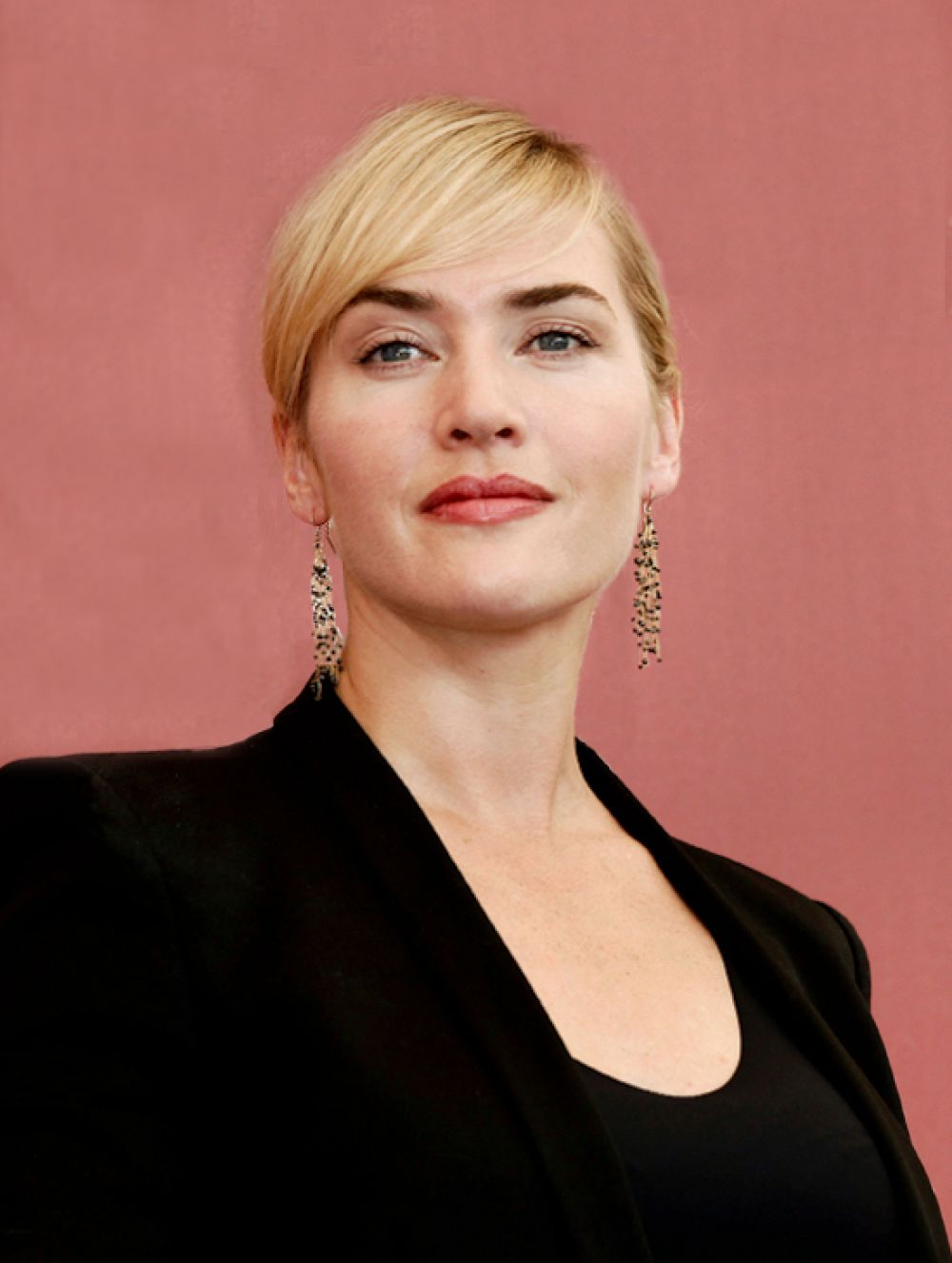
Kate Winslet, Outstanding Performance by a Female Actor in a Miniseries or Television Movie winner

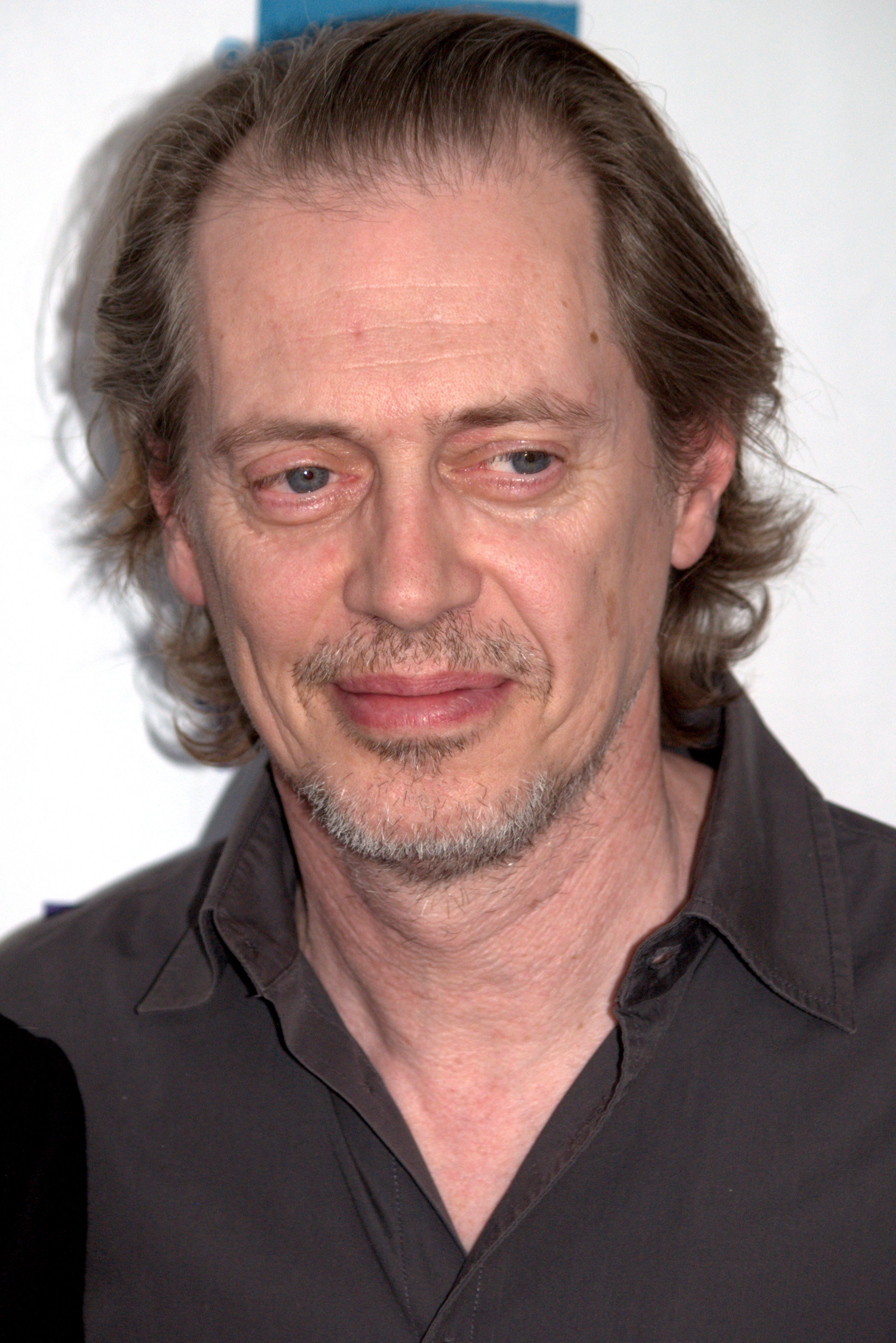
Steve Buscemi, Outstanding Performance by a Male Actor in a Drama Series winner

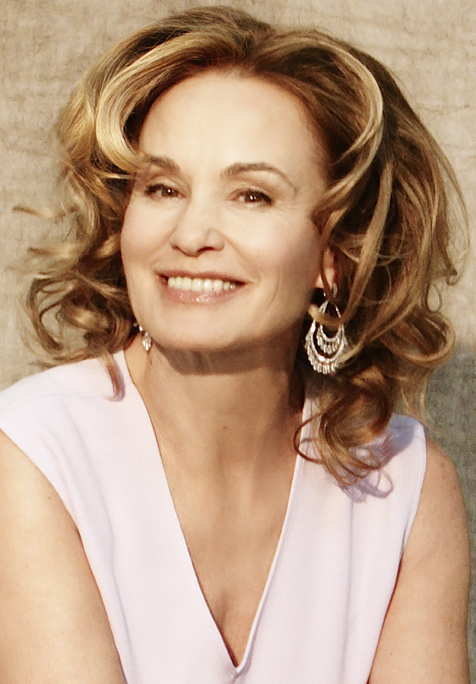
Jessica Lange, Outstanding Performance by a Female Actor in a Drama Series winner

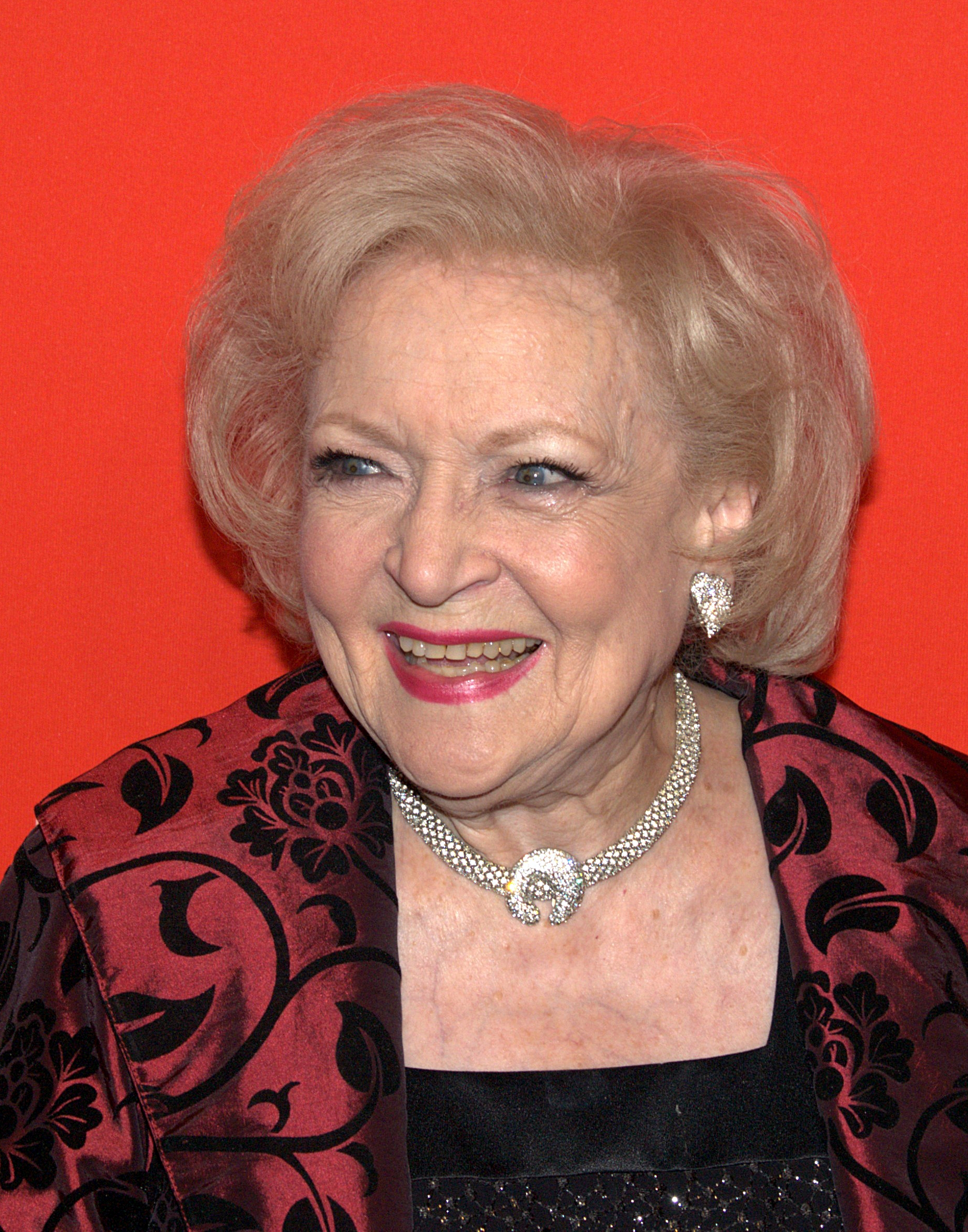
Betty White, Outstanding Performance by a Female Actor in a Comedy Series winner

=== Film ===
Outstanding Performance by a Male Actor in a Leading Role	Outstanding Performance by a Female Actor in a Leading Role
**Jean Dujardin – The Artist as George Valentin**; Demián Bichir – A Better Life as Carlos Galindo; George Clooney – The Descendants as Matt King; Leonardo DiCaprio – J. Edgar as J. Edgar Hoover; Brad Pitt – Moneyball as Billy Beane	**Viola Davis – The Help as Aibileen Clark**; Glenn Close – Albert Nobbs as Albert Nobbs; Meryl Streep – The Iron Lady as Margaret Thatcher; Tilda Swinton – We Need to Talk About Kevin as Eva Khatchadourian; Michelle Williams – My Week with Marilyn as Marilyn Monroe
Outstanding Performance by a Male Actor in a Supporting Role	Outstanding Performance by a Female Actor in a Supporting Role
**Christopher Plummer – Beginners as Hal Fields**; Kenneth Branagh – My Week with Marilyn as Laurence Olivier; Armie Hammer – J. Edgar as Clyde Tolson; Jonah Hill – Moneyball as Peter Brand; Nick Nolte – Warrior as Paddy Conlon	**Octavia Spencer – The Help as Minny Jackson**; Bérénice Bejo – The Artist as Peppy Miller; Jessica Chastain – The Help as Celia Foote; Melissa McCarthy – Bridesmaids as Megan Price; Janet McTeer – Albert Nobbs as Hubert Page
Outstanding Performance by a Cast in a Motion Picture
**The Help – Jessica Chastain, Viola Davis, Bryce Dallas Howard, Allison Janney, Chris Lowell, Ahna O'Reilly, Sissy Spacek, Octavia Spencer, Mary Steenburgen, Emma Stone, Cicely Tyson, and Mike Vogel**; The Artist – Bérénice Bejo, James Cromwell, Jean Dujardin, John Goodman, and Penelope Ann Miller; Bridesmaids – Rose Byrne, Jill Clayburgh, Ellie Kemper, Matt Lucas, Melissa McCarthy, Wendi McLendon-Covey, Chris O'Dowd, Maya Rudolph, and Kristen Wiig; The Descendants – Beau Bridges, George Clooney, Robert Forster, Judy Greer, Matthew Lillard, and Shailene Woodley; Midnight In Paris – Kathy Bates, Adrien Brody, Carla Bruni, Marion Cotillard, Rachel McAdams, Michael Sheen, and Owen Wilson
Outstanding Performance by a Stunt Ensemble in a Motion Picture
**Harry Potter and the Deathly Hallows – Part 2**; The Adjustment Bureau; Cowboys & Aliens; Transformers: Dark of the Moon; X-Men: First Class

=== Television ===
Outstanding Performance by a Male Actor in a Television Movie or Miniseries	Outstanding Performance by a Female Actor in a Television Movie or Miniseries
**Paul Giamatti – Too Big to Fail (HBO) as Ben Bernanke**; Laurence Fishburne – Thurgood (HBO) as Thurgood Marshall; Greg Kinnear – The Kennedys (Reelz) as John F. Kennedy; Guy Pearce – Mildred Pierce (HBO) as Monty Beragon; James Woods – Too Big to Fail (HBO) as Richard "Dick" Fuld Jr.	**Kate Winslet – Mildred Pierce (HBO) as Mildred Pierce**; Diane Lane – Cinema Verite (HBO) as Pat Loud; Maggie Smith – Downton Abbey (PBS) as Violet, Dowager Countess of Grantham; Emily Watson – Appropriate Adult (Sundance TV) as Janet Leach; Betty White – The Lost Valentine (CBS) as Caroline Thomas
Outstanding Performance by a Male Actor in a Drama Series	Outstanding Performance by a Female Actor in a Drama Series
**Steve Buscemi – Boardwalk Empire (HBO) as Nucky Thompson**; Patrick J. Adams – Suits (USA Network) as Mike Ross; Kyle Chandler – Friday Night Lights (DirecTV) as Eric Taylor; Bryan Cranston – Breaking Bad (AMC) as Walter White; Michael C. Hall – Dexter (Showtime) as Dexter Morgan	**Jessica Lange – American Horror Story (FX) as Constance Langdon**; Kathy Bates – Harry's Law (NBC) as Harriet "Harry" Korn; Glenn Close – Damages (FX) as Patty Hewes; Julianna Margulies – The Good Wife (CBS) as Alicia Florrick; Kyra Sedgwick – The Closer (TNT) as Brenda Leigh Johnson
Outstanding Performance by a Male Actor in a Comedy Series	Outstanding Performance by a Female Actor in a Comedy Series
**Alec Baldwin – 30 Rock (NBC) as Jack Donaghy**; Ty Burrell – Modern Family (ABC) as Phil Dunphy; Steve Carell – The Office (NBC) as Michael Scott; Jon Cryer – Two and a Half Men (CBS) as Alan Harper; Eric Stonestreet – Modern Family (ABC) as Cameron Tucker	**Betty White – Hot in Cleveland (TV Land) as Elka Ostrovsky**; Julie Bowen – Modern Family (ABC) as Claire Dunphy; Edie Falco – Nurse Jackie (Showtime) as Jackie Peyton; Tina Fey – 30 Rock (NBC) as Liz Lemon; Sofía Vergara – Modern Family (ABC) as Gloria Delgado-Pritchett
Outstanding Performance by an Ensemble in a Drama Series
**Boardwalk Empire (HBO) – Steve Buscemi, Dominic Chianese, Robert Clohessy, Dabney Coleman, Charlie Cox, Josie Gallina, Lucy Gallina, Stephen Graham, Jack Huston, Anthony Laciura, Heather Lind, Kelly Macdonald, Declan McTigue, Rory McTigue, Gretchen Mol, Brady Noon, Connor Noon, Kevin O'Rourke, Aleksa Palladino, Jacqueline Pennewill, Vincent Piazza, Michael Pitt, Michael Shannon, Paul Sparks, Michael Stuhlbarg, Peter Van Wagner, Shea Whigham, Michael K. Williams and Anatol Yusef**; Breaking Bad (AMC) – Jonathan Banks, Betsy Brandt, Bryan Cranston, Giancarlo Esposito, Anna Gunn, RJ Mitte, Dean Norris, Bob Odenkirk and Aaron Paul; Dexter (Showtime) – Billy Brown, Jennifer Carpenter, Josh Cooke, Aimee Garcia, Michael C. Hall, Colin Hanks, Desmond Harrington, Rya Kihlstedt, C. S. Lee, Edward James Olmos, James Remar, Lauren Vélez and David Zayas; Game of Thrones (HBO) – Amrita Acharia, Mark Addy, Alfie Allen, Josef Altin, Sean Bean, Susan Brown, Emilia Clarke, Nikolaj Coster-Waldau, Peter Dinklage, Ron Donachie, Michelle Fairley, Jerome Flynn, Elyes Gabel, Aidan Gillen, Jack Gleeson, Iain Glen, Julian Glover, Kit Harington, Lena Headey, Isaac Hempstead Wright, Conleth Hill, Richard Madden, Jason Momoa, Rory McCann, Ian McElhinney, Luke McEwan, Roxanne McKee, Dar Salim, Mark Stanley, Donald Sumpter, Sophie Turner and Maisie Williams; The Good Wife (CBS) – Christine Baranski, Josh Charles, Alan Cumming, Matt Czuchry, Julianna Margulies, Chris Noth, Archie Panjabi, Graham Phillips and Makenzie Vega
Outstanding Performance by an Ensemble in a Comedy Series
**Modern Family (ABC) – Aubrey Anderson-Emmons, Julie Bowen, Ty Burrell, Jesse Tyler Ferguson, Nolan Gould, Sarah Hyland, Ed O'Neill, Rico Rodriguez, Eric Stonestreet, Sofía Vergara and Ariel Winter**; 30 Rock (NBC) – Scott Adsit, Alec Baldwin, Katrina Bowden, Kevin Brown, Grizz Chapman, Tina Fey, Judah Friedlander, Jane Krakowski, John Lutz, Jack McBrayer, Tracy Morgan, Maulik Pancholy and Keith Powell; The Big Bang Theory (CBS) – Mayim Bialik, Kaley Cuoco, Johnny Galecki, Simon Helberg, Kunal Nayyar, Jim Parsons and Melissa Rauch; Glee (Fox) – Dianna Agron, Chris Colfer, Darren Criss, Ashley Fink, Dot Marie Jones, Jane Lynch, Jayma Mays, Kevin McHale, Lea Michele, Cory Monteith, Heather Morris, Matthew Morrison, Mike O'Malley, Chord Overstreet, Lauren Potter, Amber Riley, Naya Rivera, Mark Salling, Harry Shum Jr., Iqbal Theba and Jenna Ushkowitz; The Office (NBC) – Leslie David Baker, Brian Baumgartner, Creed Bratton, Steve Carell, Jenna Fischer, Kate Flannery, Ed Helms, Mindy Kaling, Ellie Kemper, Angela Kinsey, John Krasinski, Paul Lieberstein, B. J. Novak, Oscar Nuñez, Craig Robinson, Phyllis Smith, Rainn Wilson and Zach Woods
Outstanding Performance by a Stunt Ensemble in a Television Series
**Game of Thrones (HBO)**; Dexter (Showtime); Southland (TNT); Spartacus: Gods of the Arena (Starz); True Blood (HBO)

=== Screen Actors Guild Life Achievement Award ===
- Mary Tyler Moore

== Multiple nominations ==
=== Film ===
Nominations	Film
4	The Help
3	The Artist
2	Albert Nobbs
2	Bridesmaids
2	The Descendants
2	J. Edgar
2	Moneyball
2	My Week with Marilyn

=== Television ===
Nominations	Program
5	Modern Family
3	30 Rock
3	Dexter
2	Boardwalk Empire
2	Breaking Bad
2	Game of Thrones
2	The Good Wife
2	Mildred Pierce
2	The Office
2	Too Big to Fail

== Multiple wins ==
=== Film ===
Wins	Film
3	The Help

=== Television ===
Wins	Program
2	Boardwalk Empire

== In Memoriam ==
Meryl Streep introduced the 'In Memoriam' segment to pay tribute to the actors who have died in 2011:

- Susannah York
- G. D. Spradlin
- James Arness
- Jane Russell
- Bubba Smith
- Frances Bay
- Kenneth Mars
- Sada Thompson
- William Duell
- Michael Tolan
- Dolores Hope
- John Dye
- Peter Falk
- Cliff Robertson
- Betty Garrett
- Farley Granger
- Andy Whitfield
- John Wood
- Diane Cilento
- Robert Easton
- Roberts Blossom
- Francesco Quinn
- Mary Fickett
- Michael Sarrazin
- Marian Mercer
- Charles Napier
- Clarice Taylor
- Jackie Cooper
- Michael Gough
- Maria Schneider
- John Neville
- Doris Belack
- Dana Wynter
- Len Lesser
- Charlie Callas
- Harry Morgan
- Elizabeth Taylor

== See also ==
- 84th Academy Awards
- 64th Primetime Emmy Awards
- 63rd Primetime Emmy Awards
- 69th Golden Globe Awards
- 65th British Academy Film Awards
- 1st AACTA International Awards
- 32nd Golden Raspberry Awards
