= Hollywood Actress Award =

Former annual US film award

The Hollywood Actress Award was a category of the Hollywood Film Awards. It was awarded from 1999 to 2019.

== Winners ==
Year	Winner	Film(s)	Role
1999	Drew Barrymore	Ever After	Danielle de Barbarac
2000	Angelina Jolie	Girl, Interrupted	Lisa Rowe
2001	Nicole Kidman	Birthday Girl / Moulin Rouge! / The Others	Sophia / Satine / Grace Stewart
2002	Jennifer Aniston	The Good Girl	Justine Last
2003	Diane Lane	Under the Tuscan Sun	Frances Mayes
2004	Annette Bening	Being Julia	Julia Lambert
2005	Charlize Theron	North Country	Josey Aimes
2006	Penélope Cruz	Volver	Raimunda
2007	Marion Cotillard	La Vie en Rose (La Môme)	Édith Piaf
2008	Kristin Scott Thomas	I've Loved You So Long (Il y a longtemps que je t'aime)	Juliette Fontaine
2009	Hilary Swank	Amelia	Amelia Earhart
2010	Annette Bening	The Kids Are All Right	Dr. Nicole "Nic" Allgood
2011	Michelle Williams	My Week with Marilyn	Marilyn Monroe
2012	Marion Cotillard	Rust and Bone (De rouille et d'os)	Stéphanie
2013	Sandra Bullock	Gravity	Dr. Ryan Stone
2014	Julianne Moore	Still Alice	Dr. Alice Howland
2015	Carey Mulligan	Suffragette	Maud Watts
2016	Natalie Portman	Jackie	Jacqueline Kennedy Onassis
2017	Kate Winslet	Wonder Wheel	Ginny
2018	Glenn Close	The Wife	Joan Castleman
2019	Renée Zellweger	Judy	Judy Garland

== History ==
=== Superlatives ===
Actress with most awards	Overall	Best Actress	Best Supporting Actress	Other
Sandra Bullock	3	1 (Gravity)	1 (Infamous)	1 (Crash)
Carey Mulligan	3	1 (Suffragette)	1 (Drive / Shame)	1 (An Education)
Annette Bening	2	2 (Being Julia / The Kids Are All Right)	–	–
Marion Cotillard	2	2 (La Vie en Rose / Rust and Bone)	–	–
Julianne Moore	2	1 (Still Alice)	1 (A Single Man)	–
Nicole Kidman	2	1 (Birthday Girl / Moulin Rouge! / The Others)	1 (Lion)	–
Superlatives	Age	Name	Movie	Year
Oldest winner	71	Glenn Close	The Wife	2018
Youngest winner	24	Drew Barrymore	Ever After	1999
