= 1st AACTA International Awards =

Australian film and TV awards ceremony in 2012

- Date: 27 January 2012
- Site: Soho House; West Hollywood, California
- Hosted by: No host

Highlights
- Best Film: The Artist
- Most awards: The Artist (3)
- Most nominations: The Artist (4)

Television coverage
- Network: Nine Network

The 1st Australian Academy of Cinema and Television Arts International Awards (more commonly known as the AACTA International Awards), were presented by the Australian Academy of Cinema and Television Arts (AACTA), a not for profit organisation whose aim is to identify, award, promote and celebrate Australia's greatest achievements in film and television. The Academy, which normally hand out awards to Australian made films, presented awards for the best films of 2011 regardless of geography.

The Artist won three awards, for Best Film, Best Director and Best Actor. Other winners were The Iron Lady, The Ides of March and Margin Call, with one. The ceremony was presented in segments, during the 2011 AACTA Awards for Australian films, on the Nine Network.

== Background ==
On 18 August 2011, the Australian Academy of Cinema and Television Arts (AACTA) was established by the Australian Film Institute (AFI), a non for profit organisation whose aim is "to recognise and honour outstanding achievement in the Australian film and television industry." The purpose of the Academy was to raise the profile of Australian film and television in Australia and abroad, and to change the way it rewards talent from its previous jury system, to the more recognised and understood elements of foreign film organisations. The president of the awards is Australian actor Geoffrey Rush.

By 8 November 2011, the Academy announced plans for an international awards program, which would hand out awards to films regardless of geography. The winners are determined by a jury of Australian screen practitioners, in five categories: Best Film, Best Direction, Best Screenplay, Best Actor and Best Actress. The nominees were announced at the AACTA Awards Luncheon on 15 January 2011, in conjunction with the Australia Week Black Tie Gala.

== Ceremony ==
The awards were presented on 27 January 2012, at a low key event in Soho House in West Hollywood, California. The event was shown in segments during the 2011 AACTA Awards for Australian films, on 31 January 2012 at the Sydney Opera House, which was broadcast on the Nine Network.

=== Presenters ===
Name(s)	Role
Nicole Kidman	Presenter of the award for Best International Actress
Russell Crowe	Presenter of the award for Best International Actor
Phillip Noyce	Presenter of the award for Best International Direction
Bella Heathcote; Liam Hemsworth	Presenters of the award Best International Screenplay
Geoffrey Rush	Presenter of the award for Best International Film

== Winners and nominees ==
Winners are listed first and highlighted in boldface.

Best Film – International	Best Direction – International
**The Artist – Thomas Langmann**; The Descendants – Jim Burke, Alexander Payne, and Jim Taylor; Hugo – Johnny Depp, Timothy Headington, Graham King, and Martin Scorsese; The Ides of March – George Clooney, Grant Heslov, and Brian Oliver; Margin Call – Robert Ogden Barnum, Michael Benaroya, Neal Dodson, Joe Jenckes, Corey Moosa, Zachary Quinto, Laura Rister, and Cassian Elwes; Melancholia – Meta Louise Foldager and Louise Vesth; Midnight in Paris – Letty Aronson, Stephen Tenenbaum, and Jaume Roures; Moneyball – Michael De Luca, Rachael Horovitz, and Brad Pitt; The Tree of Life – Dede Gardner, Sarah Green, Grant Hill, Brad Pitt, and Bill Pohlad; We Need to Talk About Kevin – Jennifer Fox, Luc Roeg, and Bob Salerno	**Michel Hazanavicius – The Artist**; Woody Allen – Midnight in Paris; J. C. Chandor – Margin Call; Terrence Malick – The Tree of Life; Lynne Ramsay – We Need to Talk About Kevin; Nicolas Winding Refn – Drive; Martin Scorsese – Hugo; Lars von Trier – Melancholia
Best Actor – International	Best Actress – International
**Jean Dujardin – The Artist as George Valentin**; George Clooney – The Descendants as Matt King; Leonardo DiCaprio – J. Edgar as J. Edgar Hoover; Michael Fassbender – Shame as Brandon Sullivan; Ryan Gosling – The Ides of March as Stephen Meyers; Brad Pitt – Moneyball as Billy Beane	**Meryl Streep – The Iron Lady as Margaret Thatcher**; Glenn Close – Albert Nobbs as Albert Nobbs; Kirsten Dunst – Melancholia as Justine; Tilda Swinton – We Need to Talk About Kevin as Eva Khatchadourian; Mia Wasikowska – Jane Eyre as Jane Eyre; Michelle Williams – My Week with Marilyn as Marilyn Monroe
Best Screenplay – International
**The Ides of March – George Clooney, Grant Heslov, and Beau Willimon** **(TIE)**; **Margin Call – J. C. Chandor** **(TIE)**; The Artist – Michel Hazanavicius; The Descendants – Alexander Payne, Nat Faxon, and Jim Rash; Melancholia – Lars von Trier; Midnight in Paris – Woody Allen; Moneyball – Steven Zaillian, Aaron Sorkin, and Stan Chervin; We Need to Talk About Kevin – Lynne Ramsay and Rory Kinnear

== Films with multiple nominations and awards ==
The following films received multiple nominations.

- 4: The Artist, Melancholia, We Need to Talk About Kevin
- 3: The Descendants, The Ides of March, Margin Call, Midnight in Paris, Moneyball
- 2: Hugo, The Tree of Life

The following film received multiple awards.

- 3: The Artist

== See also ==
- 1st AACTA Awards
- 17th Critics’ Choice Awards
- 18th Screen Actors Guild Awards
- 65th British Academy Film Awards
- 69th Golden Globe Awards
- 84th Academy Awards
