= Toronto Film Critics Association Awards 2011 =

Annual Canadian film awards ceremony

15th TFCA Awards

December 14, 2011

Best Film:
The Tree of Life

The 15th Toronto Film Critics Association Awards, honoring the best in film for 2011, were given on December 14, 2011.

== Winners ==
- Best Actor:
  - Michael Shannon – Take Shelter

Runners-Up: George Clooney – The Descendants and Michael Fassbender – Shame

- Best Actress:
  - Michelle Williams – My Week with Marilyn

Runners-Up: Elizabeth Olsen – Martha Marcy May Marlene and Meryl Streep – The Iron Lady

- Best Animated Film:
  - The Adventures of Tintin

Runners-Up: Puss in Boots and Rango

- Best Director:
  - Terrence Malick – The Tree of Life

Runners-Up: Michel Hazanavicius – The Artist and Nicolas Winding Refn – Drive

- Best Documentary Film:
  - Nostalgia for the Light

Runners-Up: Into the Abyss and Project Nim

- Best Film:
  - The Tree of Life

Runners-Up: The Artist and The Descendants

- Best First Feature:
  - Attack the Block

Runners-Up: Margin Call and Martha Marcy May Marlene

- Best Foreign Language Film:
  - Mysteries of Lisbon • Portugal

Runners-Up: Attenberg • Greece, Le Havre • Finland and A Separation • Iran

- Best Screenplay:
  - Moneyball – Steven Zaillian and Aaron Sorkin

Runners-Up: The Descendants – Alexander Payne, Nat Faxon and Jim Rash and The Tree of Life – Terrence Malick

- Best Supporting Actor:
  - Christopher Plummer – Beginners

Runners-Up: Albert Brooks – Drive and Patton Oswalt – Young Adult

- Best Supporting Actress:
  - Jessica Chastain – Take Shelter

Runners-Up: Jessica Chastain – The Tree of Life and Shailene Woodley – The Descendants

- Rogers Canadian Film Award:
  - Monsieur Lazhar

Runners-Up: Café de Flore and A Dangerous Method
