= African-American Film Critics Association Awards 2011 =

Annual US film awards ceremony

9th African-American Film Critics Association Awards

Highlights
- Best Picture: Tree of Life

The winners for the 2011 African-American Film Critics Association.

Category	Recipient	Film
Best Picture		Tree of Life
Best Actor	Woody Harrleson	Rampart
Best Actress	Viola Davis	The Help
Best Director	Steve McQueen	Shame
Best Screenplay	Ava DuVernay	I Will Follow
Best Supporting Actor	Albert Brooks	Drive
Best Supporting Actress	Octavia Spencer	The Help
Breakthrough Performance	Adepero Oduye	Pariah

Special Achievement: George Lucas, (Cinema Vanguard); Richard Roundtree, (AAFCA Legacy); Hattie Winston (AAFCA Horizon) and Institution, Sony Pictures Entertainment.
