= Stan Chervin =

American screenwriter

- Occupation: screenwriter
- Years active: 2011–present

Stan Chervin is a screenwriter.

On January 24, 2012, he was nominated for an Academy Award for Best Adapted Screenplay for the movie Moneyball. His nomination was shared with Steven Zaillian and Aaron Sorkin.

He is Jewish.

== Career ==
=== Filmography ===
Year	Title	Role
2011	Moneyball	Story writer
2013	Space Warriors	Story and Screenplay writer
2020	Clifford the Big Red Dog	Screenplay writer
