= Hollywood Film Awards =

American motion picture award

- Awarded for: "Excellence in the art of cinema"
- Location: Santa Monica, California, United States
- Country: United States
- First award: 1997–2019
- Website: http://www.hollywoodawards.com/

The Hollywood Film Awards were an American motion picture award ceremony held annually from 1997 to 2019, usually in October or November. It was founded by Carlos de Abreu and his wife Janice Pennington. The gala ceremony took place at the Beverly Hilton Hotel in Beverly Hills, California. The 2014 ceremony, broadcast by CBS, was the first to be shown on television. The 2016 ceremony, celebrating its 20th anniversary, took place on November 6, and was hosted by James Corden.

The awards became known for being given to films that have yet to be released and for a lack of transparency in the selection process. The Los Angeles Times stated, "the selection process could be charitably described as 'vague,' with the primary criteria being the winners' promise to attend the ceremony." It has been discontinued since 2019.

== Ceremonies ==
=== 1997 ===
Hollywood Lifetime Achievement Award
Kirk Douglas
First Hollywood Visionary Cyber Award
Graham Nash
Best New Media Producer
Erik Dehkhoda

=== 1998 ===
Hollywood Career Achievement Award
Shelley Winters
Hollywood Director Award
Norman Jewison
Hollywood Producer Award
David Brown and Richard D. Zanuck
Hollywood Music in Film Award
Dave Grusin
Hollywood Music in Film Visionary Award
Stewart Copeland

=== 2002 ===
Hollywood Career Achievement Award
Jodie Foster
Hollywood Movie Award
Minority Report
Hollywood Director Award
Martin Scorsese – Gangs of New York
Hollywood Actor Award
Tom Hanks – Road to Perdition
Hollywood Actress Award
Jennifer Aniston – The Good Girl
Hollywood Breakthrough Award
Naomi Watts – The Ring
Hollywood Cinematography Award
Janusz Kaminski – Catch Me If You Can
Hollywood Editing Award
Pietro Scalia – Black Hawk Down
Hollywood Music in Film Award
Marc Shaiman
Tex Avery Animation Award
Jeffrey Katzenberg
Hollywood Leadership Award
Jack Valenti
Hollywood Humanitarian Award
Jody Williams
Hollywood Producer Award
Douglas Wick and Lucy Fischer
Hollywood Screenwriter Award
Robert Towne
Hollywood Songwriting Award
Carole Bayer Sager
