= Moneyball (film) =

2011 American biographical sports drama film directed by Bennett Miller

- Theatrical release poster
- Directed by: Bennett Miller
- Screenplay by: Steven Zaillian; Aaron Sorkin
- Story by: Stan Chervin
- Based on: Moneyball: The Art of Winning an Unfair Game by Michael Lewis
- Produced by: Michael De Luca; Rachael Horovitz; Brad Pitt
- Starring: Brad Pitt; Jonah Hill; Philip Seymour Hoffman
- Cinematography: Wally Pfister
- Edited by: Christopher Tellefsen
- Music by: Mychael Danna
- Production companies: Columbia Pictures; Scott Rudin Productions; Michael De Luca Productions; Rachael Horovitz Productions; Plan B Entertainment
- Distributed by: Sony Pictures Releasing
- Release dates: September 9, 2011 (TIFF); September 23, 2011 (United States)
- Running time: 133 minutes
- Country: United States
- Language: English
- Budget: $50 million
- Box office: $110.2 million

Moneyball is a 2011 American biographical sports drama film directed by Bennett Miller and adapted by Steven Zaillian and Aaron Sorkin. It stars Brad Pitt, Jonah Hill, Philip Seymour Hoffman, Robin Wright and Chris Pratt. The film is based on the 2003 book Moneyball: The Art of Winning an Unfair Game by Michael Lewis, an account of the Oakland Athletics baseball team's 2002 season and their general manager Billy Beane's attempts to assemble a competitive team with half (or even a third) as much money as his rivals. Moneyball follows Beane and his deputy Peter Brand as they scout the major leagues for undervalued talent by taking a sophisticated sabermetric approach to scouting and analyzing players, triggering skepticism and resentment within the baseball community.

Columbia Pictures bought the rights to Lewis's book in 2004, hiring Chervin to write the screenplay. David Frankel was initially set to direct with Zaillian now writing the screenplay, but was soon replaced by Steven Soderbergh, who planned to make the film in a semi-documentary style featuring interviews from real athletes, and having the real players and coaches on the team portray themselves. But before its July 2009 filming start, the film was put in turnaround due to creative differences between Soderbergh and Sony over a last-minute script rewrite. Soderbergh exited, and Miller was hired to direct, with Pitt becoming a producer and Sorkin hired for rewrites. Filming began in July 2010 at various stadiums such as Dodger Stadium and Oakland Coliseum.

The film premiered at the 2011 Toronto International Film Festival and was released on September 23, 2011, to box office success and critical acclaim, particularly for its acting and screenplay. The film received numerous accolades, including six Academy Awards nominations including Best Picture, Best Adapted Screenplay, Best Actor for Pitt and Best Supporting Actor for Hill.

== Plot ==
The Oakland Athletics of Major League Baseball have difficulty fielding competitive teams due to low revenue and owners who are reluctant to spend money. General manager Billy Beane drafts and develops cheap, young, and talented players, (Note: In Major League Baseball, players do not become free agents (that is, they cannot auction off their services to the highest bidder) for the first six years of their Major League careers.) but the Athletics lose the 2001 American League Division Series (ALDS) to the New York Yankees, baseball's richest and most successful team. (Note: In 2001, the Yankees' payroll was $112.8 million, over three times larger than the Athletics' payroll of $33.8 million. The Yankees had the largest payroll in baseball, while the Athletics had the second-smallest.) For the 2002 season, Beane is given a paltry $41 million budget. (Note: In 2002, the Yankees once again spent three times as much money as the Athletics.) Through free agency, three richer teams poach three of Beane's best players: Jason Giambi, Johnny Damon, and Jason Isringhausen. Adding insult to injury, Giambi joins the Yankees.

Beane is skeptical about traditional baseball scouting methods after the New York Mets drafted him in the first round of the 1980 draft—prompting Beane to decline a Stanford scholarship—only for Beane to have an unimpressive playing career. Beane tries to trade for the Cleveland Indians' Karim García, but Cleveland refuses on the advice of team advisor Peter Brand, a Yale economics graduate who privately complains to Beane that Cleveland rarely takes his advice, and expresses a belief that baseball teams focus too much on individual players to have success. Intrigued, Beane asks whether Brand would have drafted him in 1980. After Brand reluctantly admits that he would not have drafted Beane until the ninth round, Beane hires Brand.

Beane and Brand study sabermetrics, an unconventional scouting philosophy. Unable to afford more talented, expensive players, Beane and Brand focus on maximizing the team's on-base percentage (OBP) and compromise on skills like base stealing, defense, and batting average. They acquire undervalued players like aging David Justice, injured catcher Scott Hatteberg, and submariner Chad Bradford. Beane fires head scout Grady Fuson, who refuses to abandon his traditional scouting methods.

A poor start to the season prompts the media and the team to question Beane's philosophy. Manager Art Howe, who is angling for a contract extension, disregards Brand's advice to put the players with the best OBP at the top of the batting order. Howe resists playing Hatteberg at first base, so Beane forces Hatteberg into the lineup by trading away Howe's favored first baseman Carlos Peña. Although Jeremy Giambi has good on-base skills, Beane decides that Giambi lacks the intangible qualities to succeed and trades him as well. (Note: In his review of the film, critic Alan Sepinwall remarked that "I've been around the more analytically-minded corners of Sports Internet for so long that I remember the absolute *meltdown* that happened online when the Jeremy Giambi/John Mabry trade happened. I just looked up the Baseball Prime comments from that day. A highly representative quote: 'So much for Billy Beane, Genius.'" In 2012, Chris Jaffe remarked in The Hardball Times that "I don’t think any such trade could inflict such psychological shockwaves on that stat community as this one did. I just don’t think it’s possible. ... Now, stats vs. scouts has become more stats and scouts.") Beane persuades team owner Stephen Schott to trust in the plan. With Cleveland performing poorly, Beane devises a trade for the Indians' star reliever Ricardo Rincón.

The Athletics' performance improves, placing them on the verge of an AL-record-breaking 20th consecutive win. Although Beane rarely attends games, his daughter Casey persuades him to attend the next game against the Kansas City Royals. Oakland leads 11–0 when Beane arrives, but the Royals mount a furious comeback and tie the game. Hatteberg hits a walk-off home run to the Oakland fans' delight. Despite the celebration, Beane tells Brand he will not be satisfied until they have changed baseball by winning the World Series.

The Athletics are the 2002 American League West champions but lose to the Minnesota Twins in the first round of division playoffs. A media analyst asserts that the Athletics lost because they lacked intangible qualities that cannot be measured with statistics. Later, Boston Red Sox owner John W. Henry offers Beane the largest contract for a general manager in history to take over the Red Sox organization. Beane discloses Henry's offer to Brand and says that their strategy failed. Brand shows Beane a video of batter Jeremy Brown, who hits a home run, but does not realize it. Sensing the meaning of the video and what Brand is trying to say, Beane thanks Brand. Beane drives while listening to a burned CD of Casey singing "The Show", prompting him to cry.

An epilogue reveals that Beane turned down the $12.5 million offer by the Red Sox, who used sabermetrics to win the 2004 World Series, while Beane has yet to win a World Series.

== Cast ==
- Brad Pitt as Billy Beane
  - Reed Thompson plays a young Billy Beane in flashbacks
- Jonah Hill as Peter Brand, partially based on Paul DePodesta
- Philip Seymour Hoffman as Art Howe
- Robin Wright as Sharon Beane
- Chris Pratt as Scott Hatteberg
- Stephen Bishop as David Justice
- Reed Diamond as Mark Shapiro
- Brent Jennings as Ron Washington
- Ken Medlock as Grady Fuson
- Jack McGee as Rocco
- Vyto Ruginis as Chris Pittaro
- Nick Searcy as Matt Keough
- Glenn Morshower as Ron Hopkins
- Casey Bond as Chad Bradford
- Nick Porrazzo as Jeremy Giambi
- Kerris Dorsey as Casey Beane
- Arliss Howard as John W. Henry
- Derrin Ebert as Mike Magnante
- Miguel Mendoza as Ricardo Rincón
- Adrian Bellani as Carlos Peña
- Art Ortiz as Eric Chavez
- Royce Clayton as Miguel Tejada

Film director Spike Jonze has a small uncredited role as Alan, Sharon's spouse. Then-Activision Blizzard CEO Bobby Kotick appears as Athletics co-owner Stephen Schott.

== Production ==
=== Development and pre-production ===
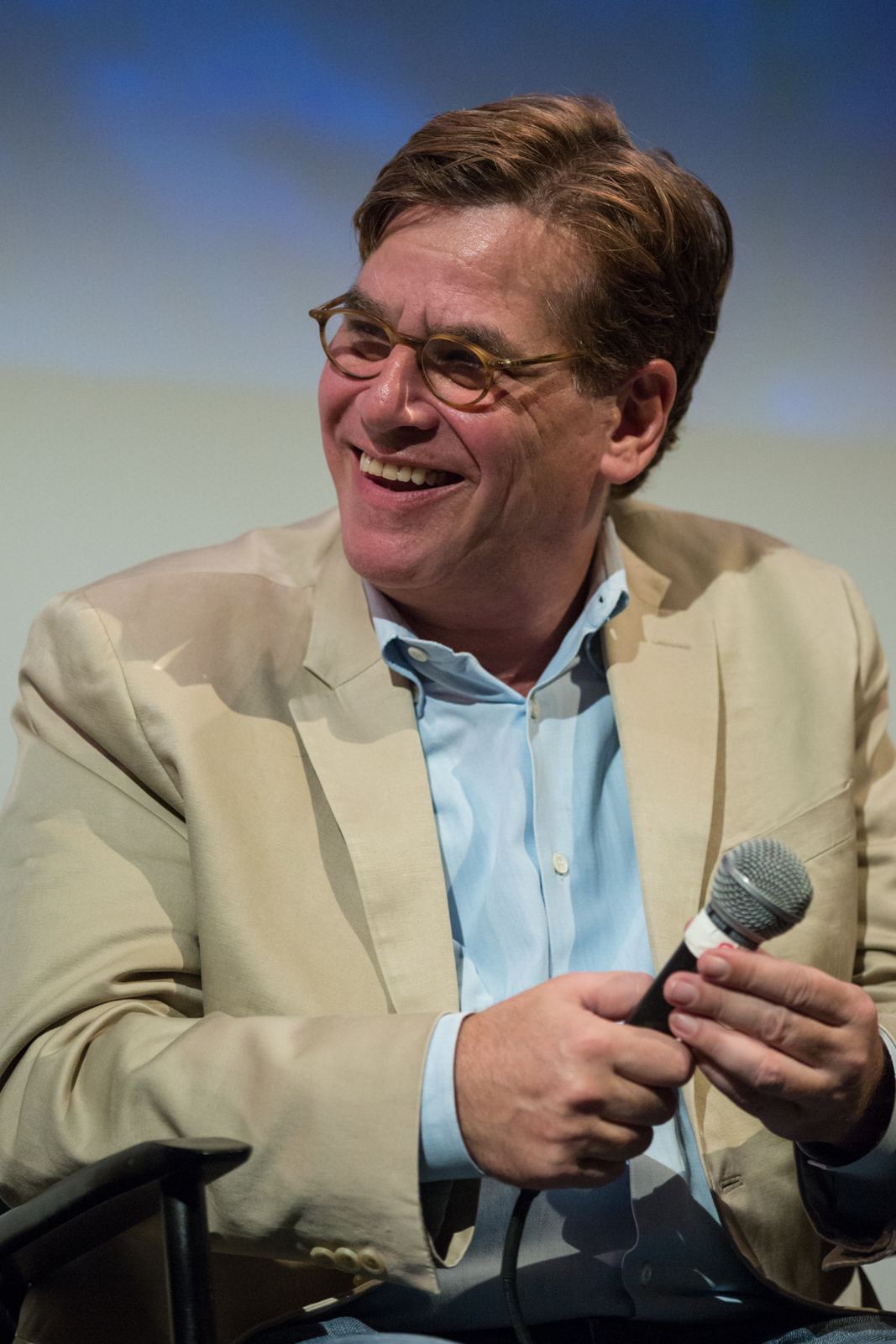
Sony Chairwoman Amy Pascal asked Aaron Sorkin (pictured) to rewrite the screenplay. He agreed on the condition the initial screenwriter Steven Zaillian gave his blessing. Sorkin and Zaillian shared screenplay credit.

In May 2004, Sony Pictures acquired the rights to the Michael Lewis book, and had hired Stan Chervin to write the screenplay. By October 2008, Brad Pitt was being courted to star in the film, now being written by Steven Zaillian, and David Frankel was attached to direct. Frankel and Pitt met with one another during the week of the 66th Golden Globe Awards to discuss the project, but eventually Frankel would exit by February 2009, with Steven Soderbergh entering negotiations to direct. Soderbergh confirmed his involvement in May that year, and in talking about the film, stated "I think we have a way in, making it visual and making it funny. I want it to be really funny and entertaining, and I want you to not realize how much information is being thrown at you because you're having fun. We've found a couple of ideas on how to bust the form a bit, in order for all that information to reach you in a way that's a little oblique". Demetri Martin was cast to play Paul DePodesta in the film, with former Athletics players Scott Hatteberg and David Justice playing themselves, and interview segments featuring players Darryl Strawberry and Lenny Dykstra set to occur.

Production under Soderbergh was set to begin in July 2009, and was to be shot on location at Oakland Coliseum. Art Howe, former manager of the team, was also set to appear as himself. Five days before its July 8 filming start date, Sony cancelled the film and entered it into "limited turnaround". The cited reason for the cancellation was that, upon a last-minute script revision by Soderbergh that added "an abundance of baseball details", studio executives felt the audience would feel alienated. It was also stated that the studio now felt the film was too "arty" for its $58 million budget. Soderbergh was said to be unwilling to compromise, leaving Sony chairwoman Amy Pascal "apoplectic". Paramount Pictures and Warner Bros. both turned down offers to pick up the project. Soderbergh revealed he exited the film in a September 2009 interview with The Orlando Sentinel, saying, "There have been a couple of times in my career where I've been unceremoniously removed from projects. I don't waste a lot of energy on it. It doesn't get you anywhere. As soon as it became clear that there was no iteration of that movie that I was going to get to direct, I immediately started looking around for something else to do".

In December 2009, Bennett Miller was hired to direct the film, with the casting of Jonah Hill, who was replacing Martin as DePodesta, announced in March 2010. DePodesta's name was removed upon his request as he felt the script no longer accurately depicted him; Hill was given the role of a DePodesta-like "Peter Brand." Aaron Sorkin was brought on to provide a rewrite of the screenplay. Pascal had specifically sought out Sorkin's involvement, in addition to Pitt joining as a producer, and bringing producer Scott Rudin on board as executive producer. Sorkin agreed on the condition Zaillian gave his blessing. Sorkin and Zaillian eventually worked on different drafts of the script independently of one another. Miller took three weeks to agree to do the film, stating that he was not interested in making a traditional sports film, seeking instead to make it "subversive to the genre. It's not really a conventional sports movie. It puts all that stuff on its head". Cinematographer Adam Kimmel was initially set to work on the film, but due to his April 2010 arrest for sexual assault, was replaced by Wally Pfister. In May, Philip Seymour Hoffman and Robin Wright entered negotiations to join the cast, with Hoffman portraying Howe, and Wright as Beane's ex-wife. Chris Pratt, Stephen Bishop and Kathryn Morris were added to the cast in July, though Morris's scenes were cut. Pratt described how he initially was told in his first audition for the role of Hatteberg that he was "too fat". He took three months to work out and shed 30 pounds, which led to him winning the role. Bishop, portraying Justice in the film, had grown up idolizing the player, and played baseball for the advanced-A affiliate team of the Atlanta Braves at the time Justice was on their roster. Real baseball players, scouts, umpires, executives, and groundskeepers were included alongside the actors. For the role of Billy Beane's daughter, Miller auditioned several young actresses before selecting Kerris Dorsey, whose performance included a rendition of Lenka's "The Show".

=== Filming ===
Filming was given a July 2010 start date with a reduced budget of $47 million after Pitt agreed to a pay cut. Filming took place at Blair Field for eight days. To save money, Dodger Stadium was used to stand in for several stadiums. Roughly 700 extras portrayed fans in the stadiums for the game scenes. Scenes were shot at the Oakland Coliseum beginning on July 26. Principal photography took place over 58 days, with filming locations including Dodger Stadium, the Oakland Coliseum, and Fenway Park. Production designer Jess Gonchor recreated the interior spaces of the Oakland Athletics' facilities—including the locker room, weight room, and video room—on a Sony soundstage, while exteriors of the Coliseum were filmed on location, often at night to accommodate the A's game schedule. Since the production had a limited budget, Dodger Stadium was dressed to represent multiple ballparks visited by the Athletics. Some scenes set in Oakland were filmed in Long Beach, San Pedro Harbor, and Glendale, California.

=== Music ===
The score was composed by Mychael Danna, with whom Miller worked on Capote. Danna implemented the song "The Mighty Rio Grande" by This Will Destroy You throughout the film. Joe Satriani plays "The Star-Spangled Banner" at the first game of the 2002 season. In the film, Billy Beane's daughter, Casey Beane (played by Kerris Dorsey), performs a cover of Australian singer Lenka's 2008 song "The Show", which is included in the soundtrack of the film. "Give Up the Funk" by Parliament also appears on the soundtrack.

== Accuracy ==
David Haglund of Slate and Jonah Keri of Grantland criticized the film and book for excluding pitchers Tim Hudson, Mark Mulder, and Barry Zito and position players such as Eric Chavez and Miguel Tejada—all discovered via traditional scouting methods, and key contributors to the success of the 2002 Athletics. The San Francisco Chronicle noted several inaccuracies in the film, including that players such as Giambi and Bradford had already joined the team before the time depicted in the film, and that the Giambi and Peña trades did not occur at the same time.

Former Oakland A's manager Art Howe has spoken publicly about his disapproval of his portrayal in an interview on SiriusXM. "It is very disappointing to know that you spent seven years in an organization and gave your heart and soul to it and helped them go to the postseason your last three years there and win over 100 games your last two seasons and this is the way evidently your boss [Beane] feels about you." Howe also said producers of Miller's version of the film didn't contact him to consult on his portrayal. Hatteberg also said that Howe was portrayed inaccurately, saying: "Art Howe was a huge supporter of mine. I never got the impression from him that I was not his first choice." He mentioned Howe and Beane had a "turbulent relationship".

== Release ==
Moneyball premiered at the Toronto International Film Festival on September 9, 2011, and was released theatrically on September 23, 2011, by Columbia Pictures. The film was also released on DVD and Blu-ray on December 6, 2011, by Sony Pictures Home Entertainment. Moneyball was released on 4K Ultra HD Blu-ray on April 28, 2026.

== Reception ==
=== Box office ===
Moneyball grossed $75.6 million in the United States and Canada and $34.6 million in other territories for a worldwide total of $110.2 million, against a production budget of $50 million. The film grossed $19.5 million from 2,993 theaters in its opening weekend, finishing second at the box office behind the 3D re-release of The Lion King. In its second weekend it grossed $12 million (a drop of only 38.3%), again finishing second.

=== Critical response ===
On Rotten Tomatoes, Moneyball holds an approval rating of 94% based on 265 reviews, with an average rating of 8.00/10. The website's critical consensus reads: "Director Bennett Miller, along with Brad Pitt and Jonah Hill, take a niche subject and turn it into a sharp, funny, and touching portrait worthy of baseball lore." On Metacritic, the film has a weighted average score of 87 out of 100, based on 42 critics, indicating "universal acclaim". Audiences polled by CinemaScore gave the film an average grade of "A" on an A+ to F scale. The film appeared on 35 critics' top-ten lists for the best films of 2011, with two critics ranking it first and another ranking it second.

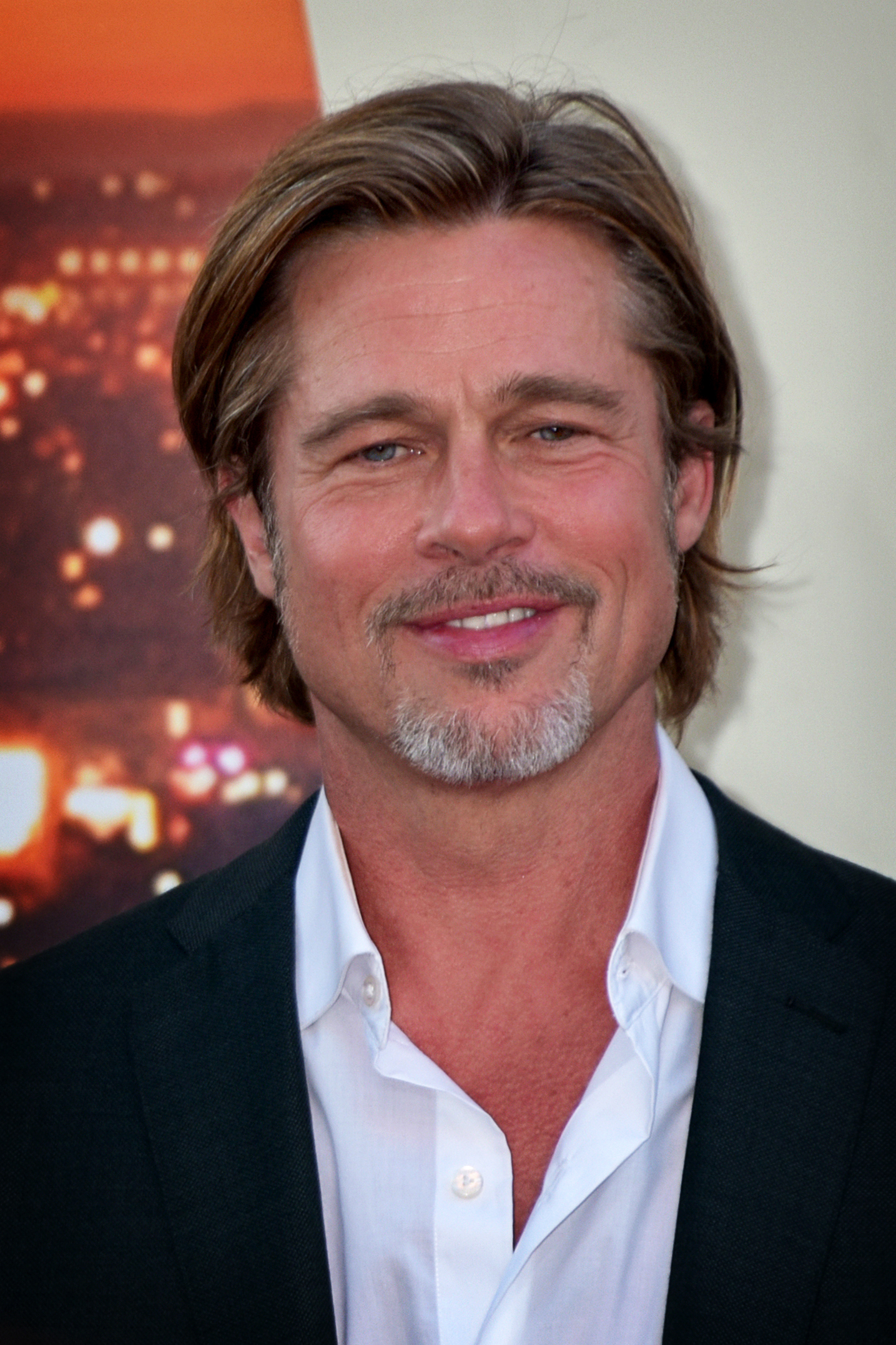
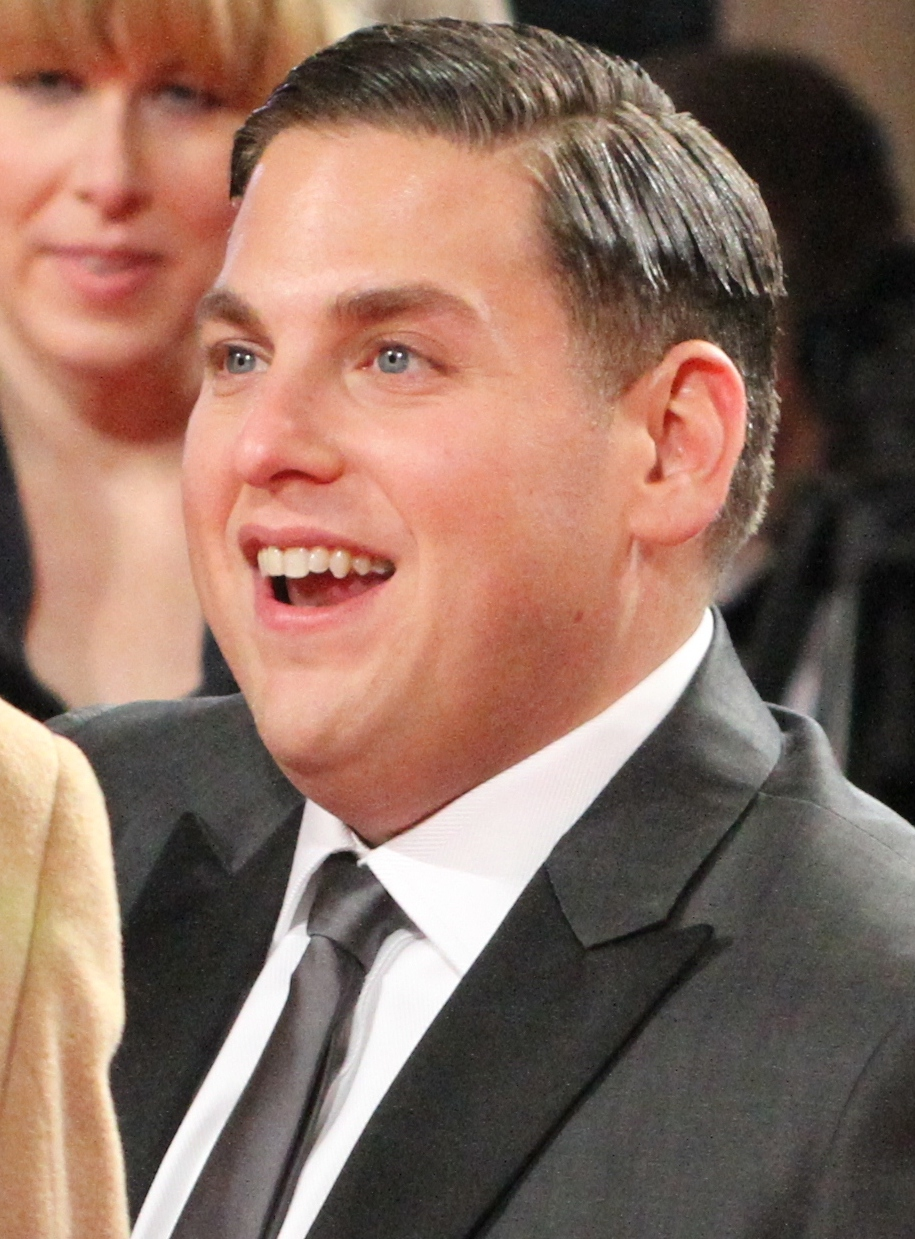
Brad Pitt and Jonah Hill garnered critical acclaim, earning them Academy Award nominations for Best Actor and Best Supporting Actor respectively.

Roger Ebert, in his four-star review, praised the film for its "intelligence and depth", specifically highlighting the screenplay and its "terse, brainy dialogue." Manohla Dargis of The New York Times found Pitt's performance "relaxed yet edgy and sometimes unsettling", and stated she couldn't see anyone but Pitt in the role. Writing for Rolling Stone, Peter Travers also praised Pitt's performance, in addition to Miller's direction and the screenplay, which he referred to as "dynamite". Owen Gleiberman for Entertainment Weekly highlighted Hoffman's performance alongside Pitt and Hill, finding Hoffman "does a character turn that's as fresh for him as the crew cut that makes him look like a grizzled old-timer." Kirk Honeycutt was complimentary of the comedic chemistry between Pitt and Hill, which prompted Honeycutt to compare the film to The Bad News Bears and Major League. Brian Eggert, owner and film critic of Deep Focus Review, said "even if you don't care much for baseball or sports in general, traces of a very human underdog drama come through to render the experience a universally consumable one."

In his review for New York magazine, David Edelstein said that Pitt's performance made the film more focused towards Beane as opposed to the team. Dana Stevens of Slate wrote that the film could be enjoyed by viewers who typically don't like sports movies. Stevens also highlighted Hill's performance, saying that the role "gives him the chance to be funny, not by wisecracking broadly but by underreacting." Writing in Slant Magazine, Bill Weber praised Pitt's performance, but found the film formulaic: "But true to Hollywood's tireless efforts to fit square-peg material into roundish genre niches, this wavering, intermittently smart story of daring to think differently flattens its narrative into formula." Weber also felt the audience would endure "tonal whiplash", pointing to the scene of Beane and Brand executing various trades: "played for laughs" but "the rhythm isn't snappy enough to draw laughs." Peter Hartlaub of the San Francisco Chronicle found the film to be filled with compromises, writing, "Someone crammed Major League-style sports cliches into a more nuanced story about baseball and progress – and then tried to fit a Brad Pitt star vehicle inside of that. The result is an interesting but frustrating near-miss." Hartlaub also criticized the film's runtime.

In 2021, members of Writers Guild of America West (WGAW) and Writers Guild of America, East (WGAE) voted its screenplay 56th in WGA’s 101 Greatest Screenplays of the 21st Century (So Far). In 2025, the film ranked number 45 on The New York Times' list of "The 100 Best Movies of the 21st Century" and number 94 on the "Readers' Choice" edition of the list.

== Accolades ==
The film received 6 Academy Award nominations, including Best Picture, Best Actor (Pitt), Best Supporting Actor (Hill), Best Adapted Screenplay, Best Sound Mixing and Best Film Editing. At the 69th Golden Globe Awards, the film received 4 nominations: Best Motion Picture – Drama, Best Actor - Drama (Pitt), Best Supporting Actor - Motion Picture (Hill) and Best Screenplay.

== See also ==
- List of baseball films
- List of films about mathematicians
