= Barbara Barg =

American writer

Barbara Barg (April 29, 1947 — May 22, 2018) was a poet, writer, and musician.

Barbara Barg as photographed by Robert Mapplethorpe

Barg was born in Memphis, Tennessee and raised in Forrest City, Arkansas. After studying with poet Ted Berrigan at Northeastern Illinois University in Chicago, she moved to New York City and became involved in a number of individual and collaborative no wave projects on the downtown poetry/music scene in the late 1970s-1990s. She performed frequently at venues like The Kitchen, Bowery Ballroom, St Mark's Poetry Project, Bowery Poetry Club, Nuyorican Poets Café, Fez, CBGB, Luna Lounge, Sidewalk Cafe's The Fort, Mercury Lounge, Galapogos, The SculptureCenter, The Open Center, as well as One World Poetry Festival (Amsterdam) and The International Festival of the Poets (Rome). With writer Maggie Dubris she co-founded the all-women cult band Homer Erotic (1991 to 2000), which came to life during a lull in poetry readings in the early 90s. The Homer Erotic group was composed of seven women, all interested in music and poetry as a performance art form.

Barg also performed with Pauline Oliveros, Elliott Sharp, Z'EV, Janene Higgins, Monique Buzzarté and other experimental artists and musicians.

Her poetry is attuned to notions of poetic ethnologies, and what she called "voluntary evolution" ("evolution for the hell of it") and "whatever other notion I get in my head".

Until her death On May 22, 2018, She was 71. Barg lived in Chicago and was on faculty at The Chicago School of Poetics, that was founded by poet Francesco Levato in 2011 to teach and practice experimental poetics. Barg was also writing screenplays for Jump Room Films.

== Books ==
- The Origin of THE Species, photograph by Robert Mapplethorpe ( Semiotext(e) )
- Obeying the Chemicals with photographs by Nan Goldin (Hard Press)

== Recordings ==
- Yield (with the band Homer Erotic, 1998 - Creme de la Femme)
- Homerica the Beautiful (with the band Homer Erotic, 1999 - Bobby Previte's Depth of Field label)
- Calling You Home (with the band Coyote Poets of the Universe, 2008 - Square Shaped Records)
- Holding Patterns (with the band Zanana, 2005 - Deep Listening )

== Literary anthologies ==
Barg's works have appeared in the following literary anthologies.

- American Poets Say Goodbye to the 20th Century (Four Walls Eight Windows)
- Poems for the Nation: A Collection of Contemporary Political Poems (Seven Stories Press) Edited by Allen Ginsberg, Andy Clausen and Eliot Katz
- AM LIT: Neue Literatur Aus Den USA (Edition Druckhaus / Germany) Edited by Gerard Falkner and Sylvere Lotringer
- Out of This World: The Poetry Project at St. Mark's Church in-the-Bowery; 1966-1991 (Crown Publisher, Inc). Edited by Anne Waldman (with foreword by Allen Ginsberg)
- The L=A=N=G=U=A=G=E Book (Southern Illinois University Press) Edited by Charles Bernstein and Bruce Andrews

== Audio anthologies ==
Barg has contributed to numerous sound art anthologies, including Elliott Sharp's multi-artist compilation CDs State of the Union, Beneath the Valley of the Yahoos, Phone Noir (with Fem Noir), Late 20th Century Sexual Practices, One World Poetry (a multi-artist compilation recorded at Amsterdam's One World Poetry Festival), and Sugar Alcohol & Meat (produced by John Giorno Poetry Systems). Barg's audio work features in three multi-artist compilation cassette tapes: Noise Fest (with the band Avant Squares), and twice on Tellus Audio Cassette Magazine (in #1 and #5) (both with Barbara Ess).
