= Levato =

Levato is a surname. Notable people with the name include:

- Peter Levato, American murder victim
- Mateo Levato, Argentine professional football player
- Leonardo Levato, Roman Catholic prelate
- Francesco Levato, American poet, translator and new media artist
