= Supercut =

Compilation of short video clips sharing the same theme

A supercut is a genre of video editing consisting of a montage of short clips with the same theme. The theme may be an action, a scene, a word or phrase, an object, a gesture, or a cliché or trope. The technique has its roots in film and television and is related to vidding. The montage obsessively isolates a single element from its source or sources. It is sometimes used to create a satirical or comic effect or to collapse a long and complex narrative into a brief summary.

== History ==
Supercut videos started appearing on YouTube shortly after the site's creation in 2005. The concept grew in popularity after culture writer Andy Baio covered supercuts in a blog entry in April 2008, in which he described them as "genre of video meme, where some obsessive-compulsive superfan collects every phrase/action/cliche from an episode (or entire series) of their favorite show/film/game into a single massive video montage."

The timing for supercuts' popularity aligned with the early history of the Internet, where there was weaker enforcement of copyright that allowed people to both obtain footage by questionable means and share the supercuts with others, and with the availability of easy tools to assemble such supercuts (such as iMovie and Adobe Premiere Pro). Around 2010, content owners began to exert copyright control on their products online, including taking down some supercut videos, thus making the prospect of creating a supercut video risky.

== Decline of popularity ==
At the same time, content owners were making their films and television shows available to digital download and streaming services, making it much easier for those wanting to make supercut videos. This caused some lack of quality control in supercuts, according to people like Debbie Saslaw, who had previously produced supercuts for the website Slacktory. Saslaw said that there was a certain type of editorial approach that earlier supercuts had used to tell a type of story with their editing, while newer supercuts haphazardly threw these clips together. A decade since Baio's post, there was a significant waning of supercut videos, a combination of lack of quality, copyright control by content owners, original ideas for supercuts, and a much-larger mix of content that compete for viewership alongside supercuts.

== Examples ==
- The short film The Return of Osiris by the Palestinian visual artist Essa Grayeb weaves numerous stylistically divergent excerpts extracted from Egyptian movies and television series produced between 1976 and 2016; The found footage excerpts were edited to reconstruct the late Egyptian President Gamal Abdel Nasser's resignation speech in 1967 according to the original text.
- "In 2006, an audience that eventually grew to more than six million watched CSI: Miami's David Caruso don a pair of sunglasses after making a glib remark about a victim. He kept doing it for seven minutes, in basically a möbius strip of shades and awful one-liners."
- Rich Juzwiak, a culture writer for VH1, uploaded a supercut video of the number of times that contestants in reality television shows spoke lines equivalent to "I'm not here to make friends" in mid-2008, which helped to popularize the format after Baio's post.
- Christian Marclay's 2010 art installation The Clock is a 24-hour supercut of references to time.
- "With the Internet and more specifically YouTube, local news is no longer restricted just to the municipalities that it serves. It is easier than ever for someone to capture a funny clip from television and upload it online. If you're bored on the Internet searching for these clips – rest easy. A YouTube user did the heavy lifting for you, compiling 2013's best local news bloopers into one 15-minute super cut. The video begins with Kerryn Johnston, an anchor for a local TV news service in Australia. Johnston, reading off the teleprompter in Ron Burgundy-esque fashion, says, 'Good evening. Tonight, I'm going to sound like drunk.'" (Johnson says she made this joke because she thought she was only rehearsing and didn't realize she was live.)
- Video magazine Screen Junkies has produced multiple supercuts, such as all words that started with the letter "f" in The Wolf of Wall Street, drunk characters, explosions, Johnny Depp's weird faces, and last words.
- YouTube channel What's the Mashup? contains supercuts based on many films, most notably one of 100 dance sequences from different films set to Mark Ronson and Bruno Mars' "Uptown Funk."
- A supercut of every COVID-19 ad featured in 2020 are exactly alike as reported on an article of The New York Times.
- "thecussingchannel", a defunct YouTube channel launched by CinemaSins' Jeremy Scott, containing supercuts of films such as the number of profanities used in Pulp Fiction and the number of spells for all eight Harry Potter films.

== See also ==
- Video essay
- Mashup video
- Fan film
- Montage (filmmaking)
- Precious Images, Chuck Workman's 1986 Oscar-winning short film similar in content
- Final Cut: Ladies and Gentlemen
