= Boston Society of Film Critics Awards 2011 =

Annual US film awards ceremony

32nd BSFC Awards

December 11, 2011

Best Film:
The Artist

The 32nd Boston Society of Film Critics Awards, honoring the best in filmmaking in 2011, were given on December 11, 2011.

== Winners ==
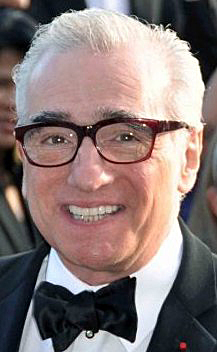
Martin Scorsese, Best Director winner

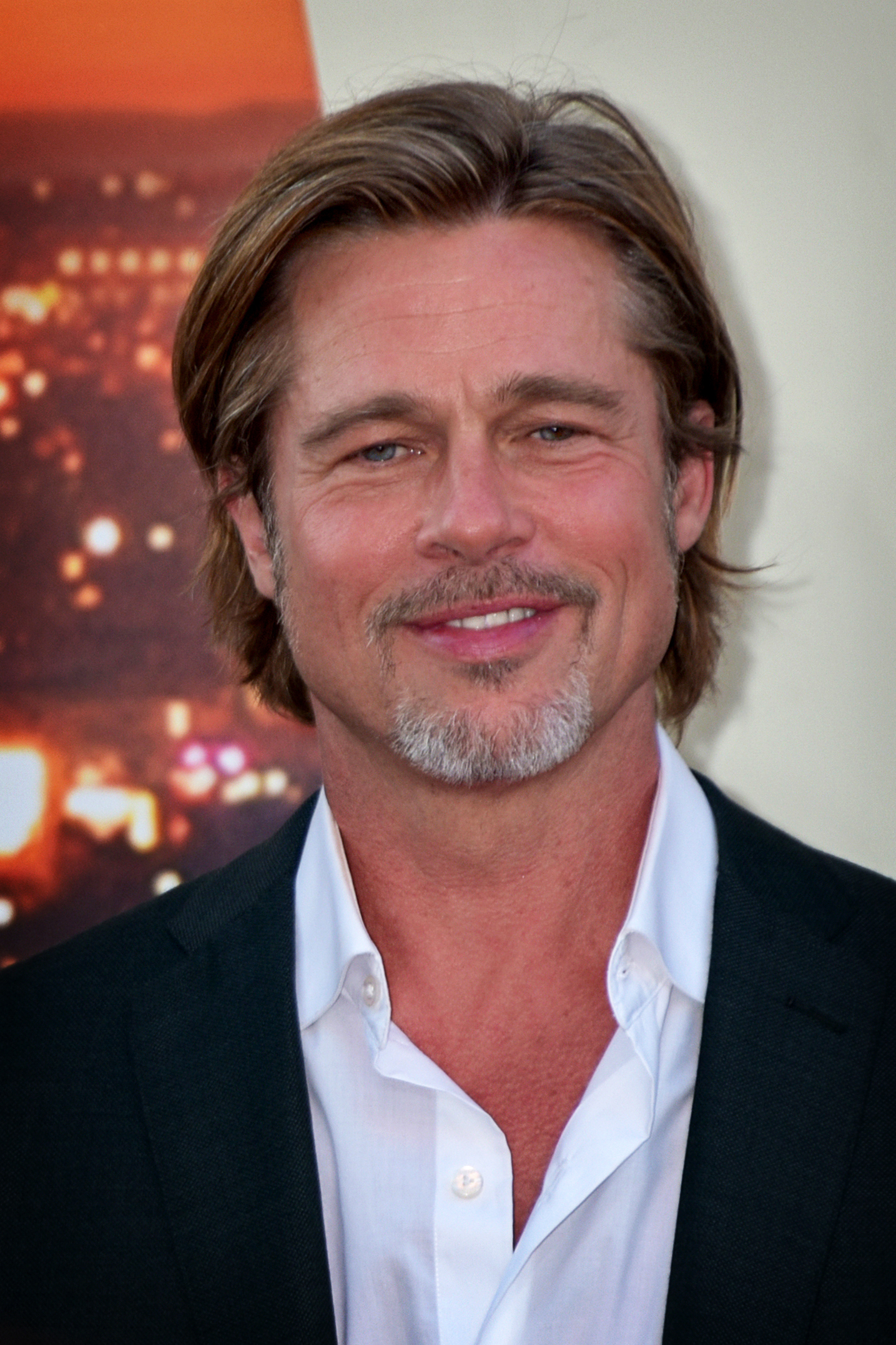
Brad Pitt, Best Actor winner

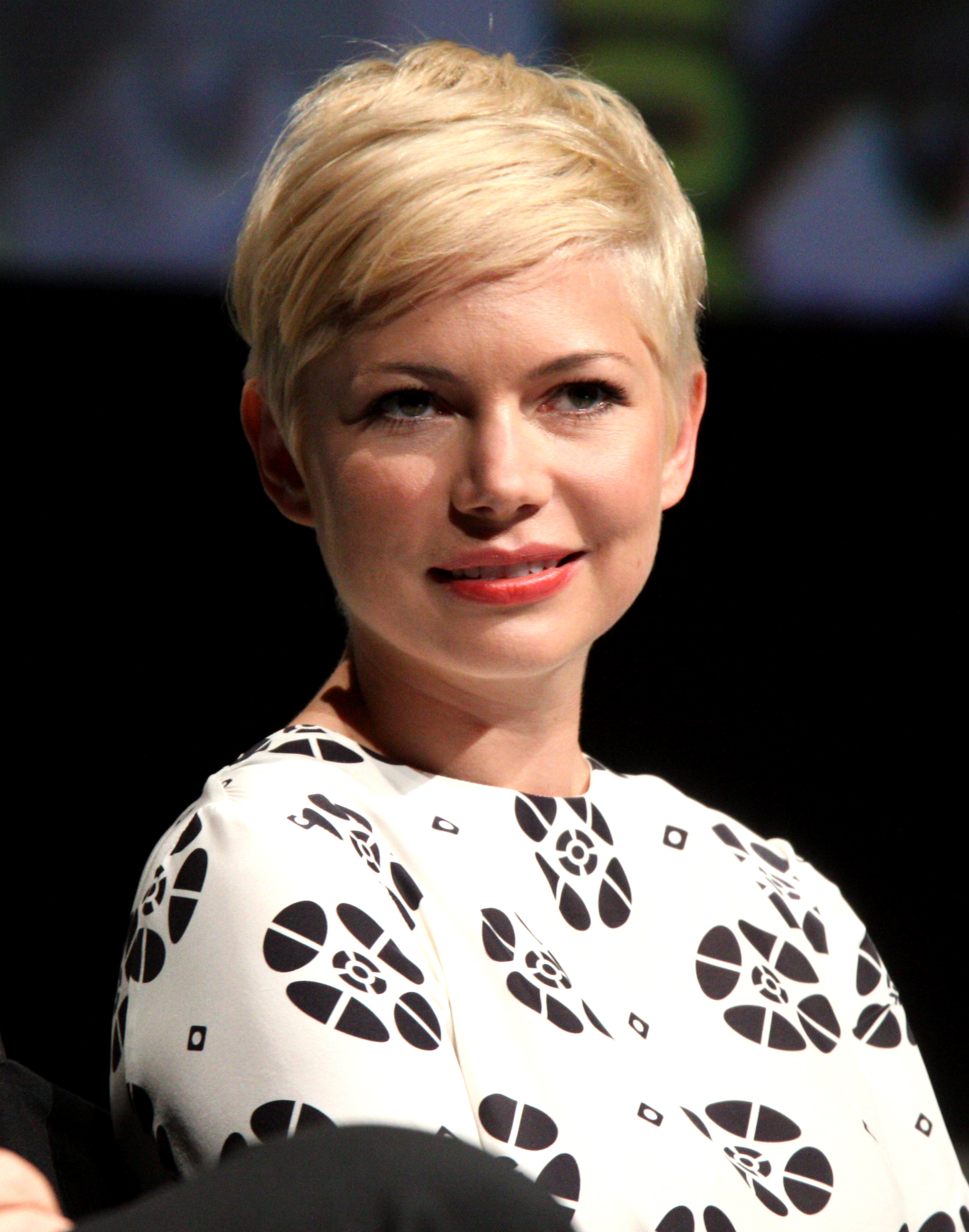
Michelle Williams, Best Actress winner

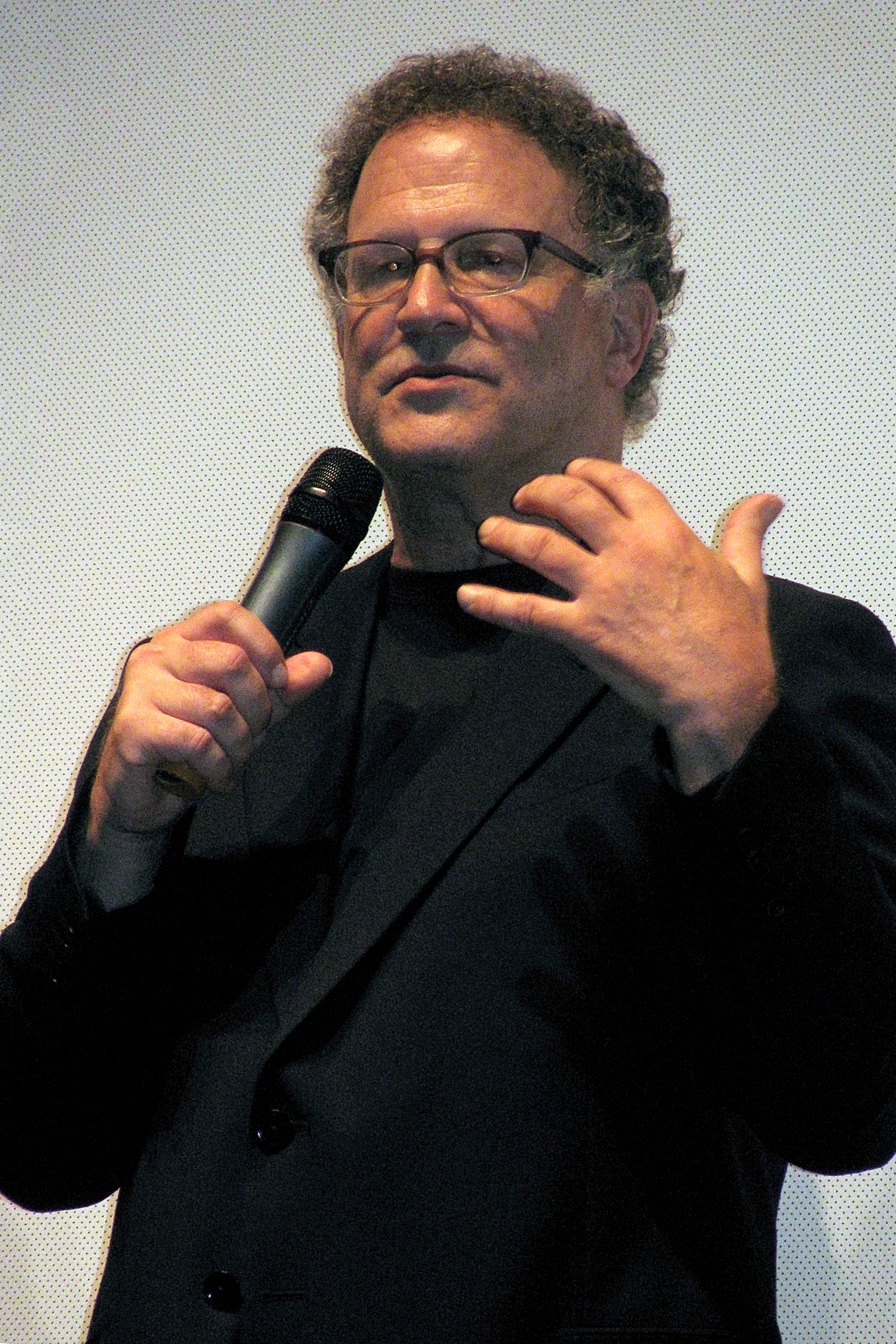
Albert Brooks, Best Supporting Actor winner

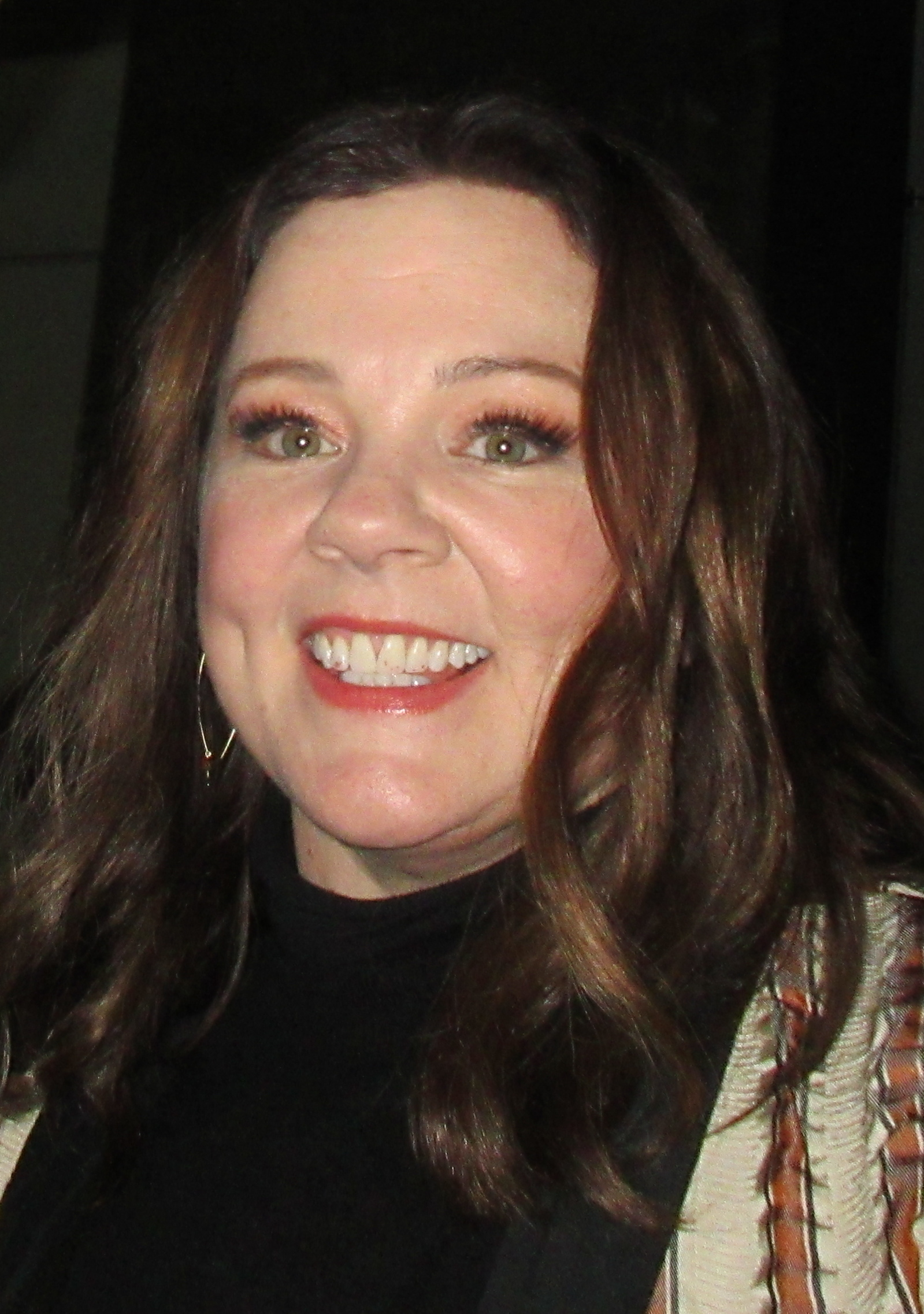
Melissa McCarthy, Best Supporting Actress winner

- Best Film:
  - The Artist
  - Runner-up: Hugo and Margaret
- Best Actor:
  - Brad Pitt – Moneyball
  - Runner-up: George Clooney – The Descendants and Michael Fassbender – Shame
- Best Actress:
  - Michelle Williams – My Week with Marilyn
  - Runner-up: Meryl Streep – The Iron Lady
- Best Supporting Actor:
  - Albert Brooks – Drive
  - Runner-up: Max von Sydow – Extremely Loud & Incredibly Close
- Best Supporting Actress:
  - Melissa McCarthy – Bridesmaids
  - Runner-up: Jeannie Berlin – Margaret
- Best Director:
  - Martin Scorsese – Hugo
  - Runner-up: Michel Hazanavicius – The Artist
- Best Screenplay:
  - Steven Zaillian and Aaron Sorkin – Moneyball
  - Runner-up: Kenneth Lonergan – Margaret
- Best Cinematography:
  - Emmanuel Lubezki – The Tree of Life
  - Runner-up: Robert Richardson – Hugo
- Best Documentary:
  - Project Nim
  - Runner-up: Bill Cunningham New York
- Best Foreign-Language Film:
  - Incendies • Canada
  - Runner-up: A Separation (Jodaeiye Nader az Simin) • Iran and Poetry (Shi) • South Korea
- Best Animated Film:
  - Rango
- Best Editing:
  - Christian Marclay – The Clock
  - Runner-up: Thelma Schoonmaker – Hugo
- Best New Filmmaker:
  - Sean Durkin – Martha Marcy May Marlene
  - Runner-up: J. C. Chandor – Margin Call
- Best Ensemble Cast:
  - Carnage
  - Runner-up: Margaret
- Best Use of Music in a Film (TIE):
  - The Artist
  - Drive
  - Runner-up: The Descendants
