= The Clock (2010 film) =

Film by video artist Christian Marclay

- Directed by: Christian Marclay
- Written by: Christian Marclay
- Produced by: Paula Cooper
- Edited by: Christian Marclay
- Release date: 15 October 2010 (United Kingdom)
- Running time: 1440 minutes (24 hours)
- Country: United Kingdom
- Budget: US$100,000

The Clock is a film by video artist Christian Marclay. It is a looped 24-hour video supercut of scenes from film and television that feature clocks or timepieces. The artwork itself functions as a clock: its presentation is synchronized with the local time, resulting in the time shown in a scene being the actual time.

Marclay developed the idea for The Clock while working on his 2005 piece Screen Play. With the support of the London-based White Cube gallery, he assembled a team to find footage, which he edited together over the course of three years. Marclay debuted The Clock at White Cube's London gallery in 2010. The work garnered critical praise, winning the Golden Lion at the 2011 Venice Biennale. Its six editions were purchased by major museums, allowing it to attract a widespread following.

== Content ==
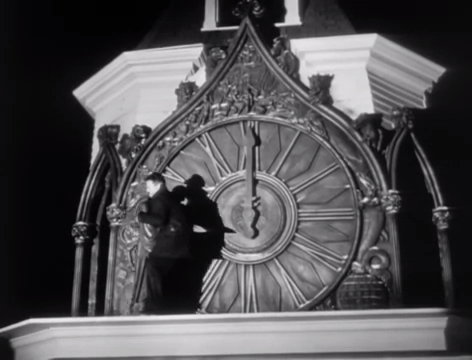
The climax of Orson Welles' The Stranger is featured at midnight.

After midnight, characters go to bars and drink. Some seek intimacy while others are angry to have been awakened by the phone. In the early hours, characters are generally alone or sleeping. Several dream sequences occur between 3 a.m. and 5 a.m. At around 7 a.m., characters are shown waking up. From 9 a.m. to noon, they eat breakfast and have wake-up sex. As noon approaches, a sequence of action scenes build up to bells ringing in High Noon. The video's pace immediately slows once noon passes.

Between 4 p.m. and 5 p.m., transportation becomes important as characters travel on planes, trains and automobiles. At 6 p.m., characters eat dinner and have shootouts. In the evening, they attend parties. Around 8 p.m., orchestras and theaters begin their shows. As midnight approaches, the characters become more frantic, throwing tantrums and requesting stays of execution. Screeching violins from multiple clips build up to the moment. At midnight, Orson Welles is impaled on a clock tower in The Stranger, and Big Ben, a common sight in The Clock, explodes in V for Vendetta.

== Production ==
=== Conception ===
The Clock was conceived in 2005 while Marclay was working on the video score Screen Play. He realised that he needed a way for musicians to synchronise with film footage. An assistant at the Eyebeam Art and Technology Center brought him footage of clocks, and Marclay began wondering if it was possible to find footage of every minute of the day. He kept the idea secret for several years, concerned that someone else would poach his idea. After his partner Lydia Yee accepted a position at the Barbican Centre, Marclay moved from New York to London in mid 2007. There he proposed the film to the White Cube gallery, unsure of the project's feasibility. He received a budget of over US$100,000, covered in part by the Paula Cooper Gallery.

=== Development ===
Not all scenes show a clock, such as one from Night of the Living Dead announcing "It's ten minutes to three."

The first several months of production were intended to show that Marclay would be able to find enough material to achieve his vision. White Cube helped him assemble a team of six people to watch DVDs and copy scenes with clocks or time. Marclay himself was often unfamiliar with the source works. They used a Google Spreadsheet to record and search through clips. As the number of scenes available increased, Marclay was able to start working on transitions between scenes. Working in Final Cut Pro, he edited clips together, standardising the video formats and smoothing the audio. He cited Bruce Conner's "odd transitions" as an influence on his editing. Marclay wanted to include more outlandish, melodramatic clips but worried that it would be exhausting over a long period. He instead focused on incidental moments; his head assistant Paul Anton Smith explained that Marclay wanted to show scenes that were "banal and plain but visually interesting." One assistant who focused heavily on scenes of violence was fired, and the remaining assistants began to specialise in individual film genres.

After six months, Marclay presented White Cube with several extended sequences, confident that he would eventually be able to finish the project. The footage began taking up too much capacity, so he worked on two Power Mac G5s with footage split by time of day. Marclay organised files by hour, which became like chapters for him. Each folder suggested different themes to him, allowing him to form loose narratives. He spent three years editing scenes together. Some of the scenes not selected for The Clock became a part of his 2012 performance piece Everyday.

In mid 2010, Marclay recruited Quentin Chiappetta, a sound designer with whom he had worked before, to work on the audio for The Clock. He saved files to disc and sent them to Chiappetta so that the films' soundtracks could be equalised. By September, Marclay realised that hundreds of the audio transitions were lacking, with White Cube set to premiere The Clock the following month. Because of his background as a DJ, he did not want to use simple fades between clips. He went to Chiappetta's MediaNoise studio in Williamsburg, Brooklyn, where the two worked on the soundtrack using Pro Tools. In some cases, they created completely new audio for the scenes. During the first week of The Clock's exhibition, Marclay continued fixing continuity errors and working on the audio. The final product used around 12,000 clips. Because of its size, Marclay enlisted professor Mick Grierson to create a program that plays the separate audio and video tracks, synchronised with the current time. The program continues running while a museum is closed so that it remains synchronised.

== Release ==
Marclay made six editions of The Clock, plus two artist's proofs. Five copies were designated to be sold to institutions for US$467,500, each under the condition that The Clock can't be played in more than one location at the same time. The last copy was sold to hedge fund manager Steven A. Cohen for an undisclosed amount. Within a day of premiering The Clock, White Cube received a host of offers from museums, some of which purchased copies jointly. The sale became one of the largest purchases of video art and one of the highest purchases to happen on the primary market. The work owned by the New York collectors Jill and Peter Kraus, is a promised gift to the Museum of Modern Art. In 2011, Steve Tisch pledged the money needed to buy the work for the Los Angeles County Museum of Art. One month later, the National Gallery of Canada and the Boston Museum of Fine Arts, announced the acquisition of another copy. In February 2012, yet another version was acquired jointly by the Tate in London, the Centre Pompidou in Paris and the Israel Museum in Jerusalem.

=== Exhibition ===
Marclay originally considered making The Clock as a public art piece. However, difficulty with lighting and sound made it impractical. Marclay gave museums specifications for the exhibitions' screening rooms. He wanted the video to be projected onto a 21 by 12 foot (6.4 m × 3.7 m) screen, in a room with white IKEA couches. Presenting the piece became a source of friction between Marclay and some museums. The Art Newspaper reported that LACMA's director Michael Govan wanted to project it onto the museum, though LACMA denied suggesting it be projected outside. Marclay disapproved of other screening locations suggested by the Boston Museum of Fine Arts and the Tate. In order to ensure that the full video would be exhibited, he required that museums agree to be open for all 24 hours at some point during its run.

The Clock premiered 15 October 2010 at White Cube's gallery in central London. Since then, it has attracted hundreds of thousands of visitors and found crossover success beyond art patrons. The Paula Cooper Gallery exhibited it in early 2011, where it attracted 11,500 visitors over the course of a month. In mid 2012, the Lincoln Center for the Performing Arts showed it to 18,000 people over six weeks. MoMA heavily promoted its run with a silent disco, a New Year's celebration and a dedicated @TheClockatMoMA account on Twitter. The month-long exhibition drew over 40,000 people.

=== Copyright ===
When he started to make The Clock, Marclay expected that copyright would not be a substantial obstacle, theorizing that "If you make something good and interesting and not ridiculing someone or being offensive, the creators of the original material will like it." He did not get copyright clearances for any of the films used. He stated that although his use was unlicensed by copyright-holders, "most would consider it fair use." Because of the film's copyright status, museums have offered it as part of their general admission instead of charging for separate tickets.

== Reception and legacy ==
The Clock has been described as "addictive" and "mesmerizing". The Guardian called it "a masterpiece of our times". Chris Petit complimented its "edge-of-hysteria relentlessness, the anti-narrative drive", and the simple concept, commenting that he wished he had thought of the idea himself. In The New York Review of Books, Zadie Smith stated that The Clock "is neither bad nor good, but sublime, maybe the greatest film you have ever seen". Newsweek named Marclay one of the ten most important artists of today. He was included in the 2012 Time 100.

At the 2011 Venice Biennale, Marclay was recognised as the best artist in the official exhibition, winning the Golden Lion for The Clock. Accepting the Golden Lion, Marclay invoked Andy Warhol, thanking the jury "for giving The Clock its fifteen minutes". The film also won in the "Best Editing" category at the Boston Society of Film Critics Awards 2011 and was included among ARTnews editors' most important artworks of the decade.

== Interpretations ==
The Clock reveals its plot largely through the use of cutaway shots. A shot indicating the time is followed by a reaction shot with a character's emotional response, often one of anxiety, fear or boredom. Petit remarked that the impact of repeated reactions lacking context "comes over as incredibly weird". The sequence interpellates viewers into The Clock's flow, and they often experience a detached, hypnotic effect.

Marclay viewed The Clock as a memento mori. In contrast to the escapism that cinema provides, The Clock draws attention to how much time the audience has spent watching it. As they spend more time with the film, its actors reappear at various points in their careers. To make this theme more explicit, Marclay included symbols of time and death in connecting shots. These included sunsets; withering flowers; and burning cigarettes, which he described as "the twentieth-century symbol of time", a modern version of burning candles. Marclay included shots of turntables and vinyl records not only as a representation of "capturing time, trying to hold it back", but also as a self-reference to his earlier works that used vinyl.

=== Relation to other works ===
Marclay made several forays into video art that informed The Clock. His 1995 film Telephones forms a narrative out of clips from Hollywood films where characters use a telephone. It was a link between Marclay's audio and video art, and its discontinuous structure was a template for The Clock. Telephones broke using a telephone into several discrete steps, each reenacted by multiple films, similar to sequences in The Clock where the act of sleeping or waking is demonstrated by one character after another. His 1998 film Up and Out combines video from Michelangelo Antonioni's Blowup with audio from Brian De Palma's Blow Out. It was an early experiment in the effect of synchronization, where viewers naturally attempted to find intersections between the two works, and it developed the editing style that Marclay employs for The Clock. His 2002 installation Video Quartet is a 13-minute video with four continuous screens of clips from commercial films. Its combinations of coinciding sounds and images were a model for the synchronicity of The Clock.

The Clock has been viewed as an extension of similar compilations, particularly by Christoph Girardet. Girardet's 1999 Phoenix Tapes, a collaboration with Matthias Müller, is composed of footage from Alfred Hitchcock's films. It arranges them into clusters to illustrate Hitchcock's techniques and motifs. Girardet and Müller use low-quality footage from VHS tapes to draw attention to their appropriation. In contrast, Marclay seeks to replicate Hollywood production through high-quality footage with standardised sound production and aspect ratios. Girardet's 2003 work 60 Seconds (analog) is a 60-second film intended to be played on a loop. 60 brief shots show the hands of watches and clocks counting the seconds. Girardet wanted to show how interchangeable the cinema footage could be. Müller described it as The Clock "in a conceptual, minimalist nutshell." In 2005, Étienne Chambaud presented L'Horloge, a piece of software that displays the time using images of clocks in films. Chambaud's use of still images give L'Horloge a slower, more regular pace, whereas The Clock experiments with the rhythm of commercial films.

== Exhibitions ==
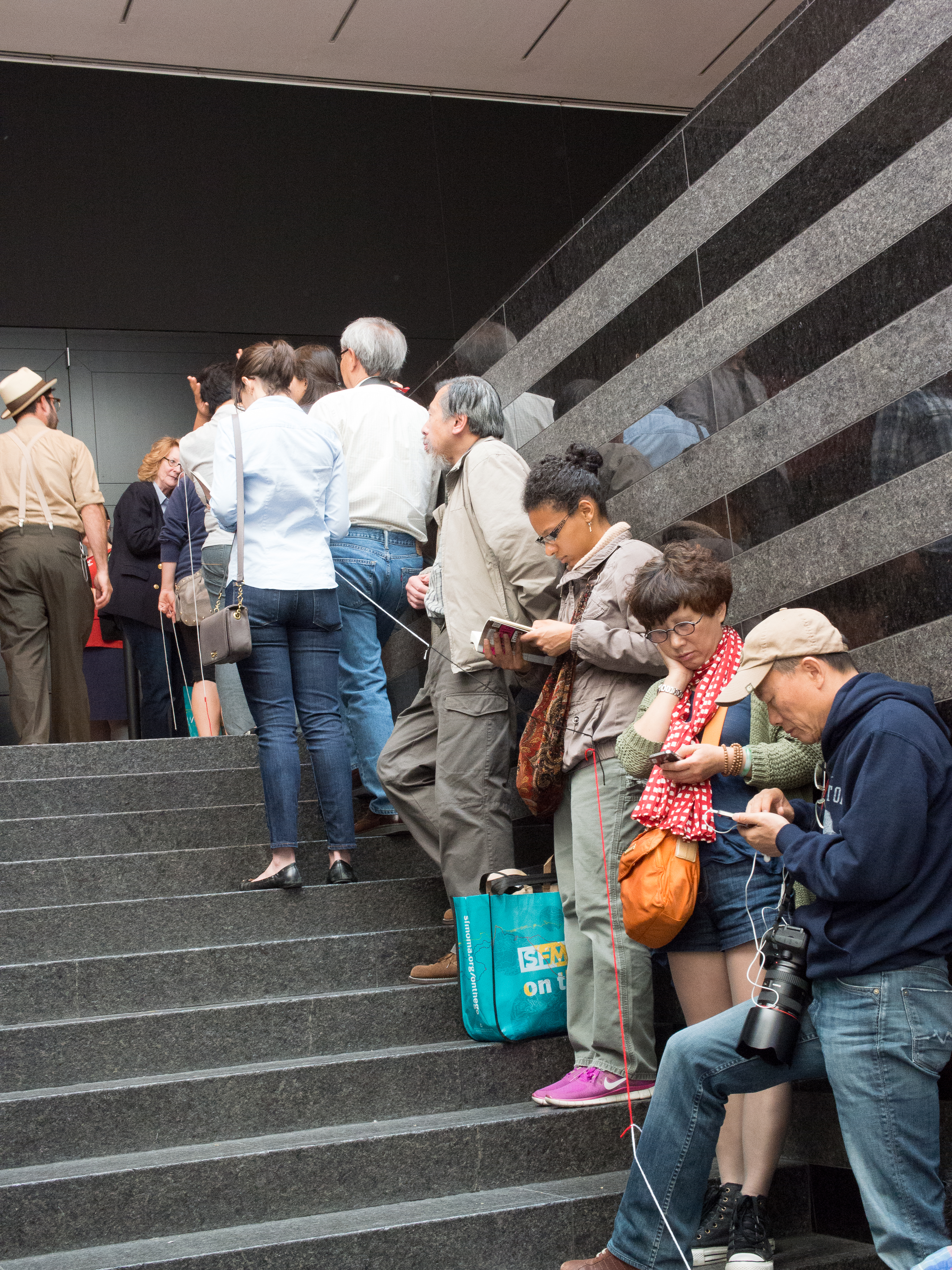
Visitors queuing at SFMOMA in 2013

- 15 October to 13 November 2010 – White Cube, London, England
- 9 December 2010 to 13 February 2011 – Leeum, Samsung Museum of Art, Seoul, South Korea
- 21 January to 19 February 2011 – Paula Cooper Gallery, New York City, New York, US
- 16 February to 17 April 2011 – Hayward Gallery, London, England
- 24 February to 25 April 2011 – Garage Center for Contemporary Art, Moscow, Russia
- 20 May to 31 July 2011 – Los Angeles County Museum of Art, Los Angeles, California, US
- 4 June to 27 November 2011 – Corderie dell'Arsenale, Venice Biennale, Italy
- 6 August to 6 November 2011 – Yokohama Museum of Art, Yokohama, Japan
- 23 August to 22 October 2011 – Israel Museum, Jerusalem
- 3 to 5 September 2011 – Centre Pompidou, Paris, France
- 16 September to 31 December 2011 – Museum of Fine Arts, Boston, Massachusetts, US
- 30 March to 6 August 2012 – Musée des Beaux-Arts du Canada/National Gallery of Canada, Ottawa, Ontario, Canada
- 29 March to 3 June 2012 – Museum of Contemporary Art, Sydney
- 13 July to 1 August 2012 – Lincoln Center, New York, New York, US
- 24 August to 9 September 2012 – Kunsthaus Zürich, Zürich, Switzerland
- 21 September to 25 November 2012 – Power Plant Contemporary Art Centre, Toronto, Ontario, Canada
- 21 December 2012 to 21 January 2013 – MoMA, New York, New York, US
- 27 January to 7 April 2013 – Wexner Center for the Arts, Columbus, Ohio, US
- 6 April to 2 June 2013 – San Francisco Museum of Modern Art, San Francisco, California, US
- 23 July to 19 October 2013 – Israel Museum, Jerusalem
- 11 October 2013 to 5 January 2014 – Winnipeg Art Gallery, Winnipeg, Manitoba, Canada
- 22 February to 20 April 2014 – Musée d'art contemporain de Montréal, Montreal, Quebec, Canada
- 6 March to 18 May 2014 – Guggenheim Museum Bilbao, Bilbao, Biscay, Spain
- 9 to 25 May 2014 – SALT Beyoğlu, Istanbul, Turkey
- 14 June to 25 August 2014 – Walker Art Center, Minneapolis, Minnesota, US
- 13 February to 12 April 2015 – Art Gallery of Alberta, Edmonton, Alberta, Canada
- 5 March to 19 April 2015 – Cultural Centre of Belém, Lisbon, Lisbon, Portugal
- 5 July to 7 September 2015 – Los Angeles County Museum of Art, Los Angeles, California, US
- 17 September 2016 to 29 January 2017 – Museum of Fine Arts, Boston, Massachusetts, US
- 10 November 2016 to 4 December 2016 – Contemporary Arts Center, New Orleans, Louisiana, US
- 1 June to 3 September 2017 – Copenhagen Contemporary, Copenhagen, Denmark
- 20 September to 19 November 2017 – Instituto Moreira Salles, São Paulo, Brazil
- 20 February to 30 June 2018 – Tel Aviv Museum of Art, Tel Aviv, Israel
- 14 September 2018 to 20 January 2019 – Tate Modern, London, England
- 23 January to 10 March 2019 – Australian Centre for the Moving Image, Melbourne, Australia
- 5 July to 22 September 2019 – The Polygon Gallery, North Vancouver, Canada
- 25 June to 18 July 2021 – Le Plaza, Geneva, Switzerland
- 26 June 2021 to 20 March 2022 – LUMA Arles, Arles, France
- 8 November 2024 to 11 May 2025 — MoMA, New York, New York, US
- 14 March to 25 May 2025 — Kunstmuseum Stuttgart, Stuttgart, Germany
- 02 May to 22 June 2025 — Listasafn Islands, Reykjavik, Iceland
- 11 November 2025 to 18 January 2026 — Neue Nationalgalerie, Berlin, Germany
- 26 July to 23 August 2026 – Los Angeles County Museum of Art, Los Angeles, California, US

== Notes and references ==
Some text for this article was copied from article Christian Marclay.
