= Graffiti Composition =

Live album by Christian Marclay
- Released: August 17, 2010
- Recorded: Museum of Modern Art, September 13, 2006
- Length: 40:45
- Label: Dog W/A Bone
- Producer: Elliott Sharp

Christian Marclay chronology
The Sounds of Christmas (2008)	Graffiti Composition (2010)

Graffiti Composition is an album by Christian Marclay. It began as a street installation in 1996 before being converted into a score and recorded. The album was released by Dog W/A Bone on August 17, 2010.

== Composition ==
In 1996 the Berlin Academy of Arts commissioned Marclay for the Sonambiente sound art festival. He plastered 5,000 blank posters of sheet music throughout the city. Marclay stated that he was "not only interested in breaking the tradition within the music or whatever I'm making, but also bringing it into a different location, to a new audience."

Most of the posters were plastered over or torn down. With those that remained, passers-by added fragments of musical notation, drawings, writing, graffiti, and abstract marks. The properly written music included scales, waltzes, and drinking songs. Participants sometimes modified each other's writings or made jokes such as an instruction to "repeat yourself until your friends are embarrassed." Marclay and an assistant returned to photograph the scores. 800 photographs of the posters were produced, and 150 were selected for the score. The Deutsche Bank Collection purchased the photographs in 2011.

== Performance and recording ==
Graffiti Composition was previewed at LSO St Luke's on March 22, 2005. Steve Beresford conducted a nine-piece ensemble of strings, brass, guitar, piano, harp, and percussion.

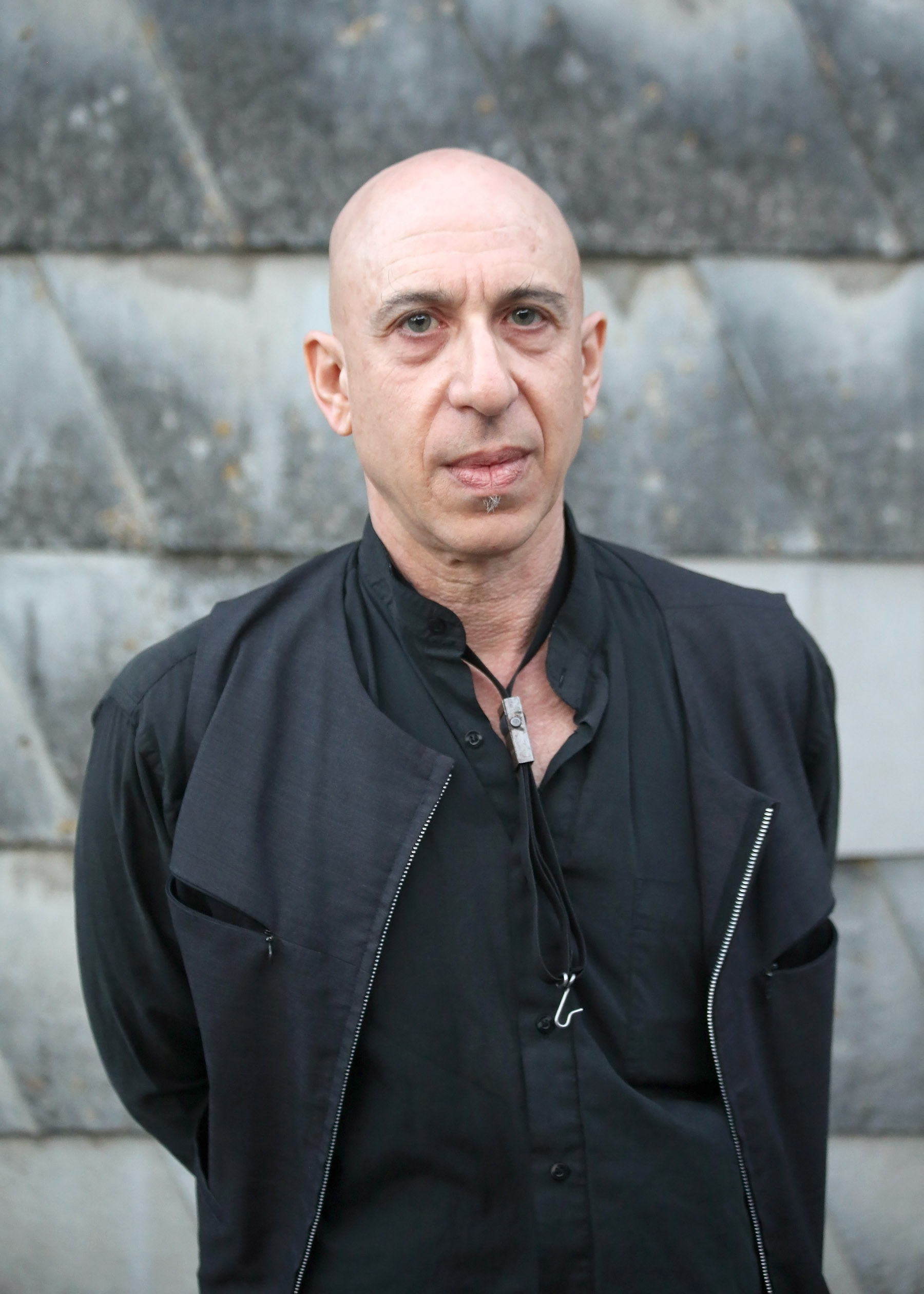
Elliott Sharp directed the recorded performance.

The album was recorded on September 13, 2006 during a performance at the Museum of Modern Art. Curator Eva Respini organized the event. Elliott Sharp selected images to fit the style of each musician and conducted the group. The group consisted of Vernon Reid, Mary Halvorson, and Lee Ranaldo on guitar; Melvin Gibbs on bass guitar; and Sharp on eight-string bass guitar. Each musician had a stopwatch so that the performance would last 40 minutes. Graffiti Composition was released in 2010 by the Dog W/A Bone label, run by the Paula Cooper Gallery. The release was timed to coincide with an exhibition of Marclay's work at the Whitney Museum. There, Sharp performed the work with pipa player Min Xiaofen.

== Reception ==
When Beresford previewed the composition, The Guardian denounced it as "offensive" and commented that the performance sounded "like every other left-field collage of scrape and hoot cobbled together to bolster the elitism of a tiny audience." The Times was impressed by its "poise and clarity" but said that it lacked energy.

After the album's release, Pitchfork Media said that it "rarely coheres into something larger than a collection of sonic events" and described the result as "uneven". PopMatters joked that "your enjoyment of my review might be increased if you understand that it is comprised of words randomly contributed by other people. Mayonnaise."

== Track listing ==
1. "Graffiti Composition 1" – 3:00
2. "Graffiti Composition 2" – 7:02
3. "Graffiti Composition 3" – 5:35
4. "Graffiti Composition 4" – 9:35
5. "Graffiti Composition 5" – 6:40
6. "Graffiti Composition 6" – 8:55
