= Elliott Sharp =

American composer and musician (born 1951)

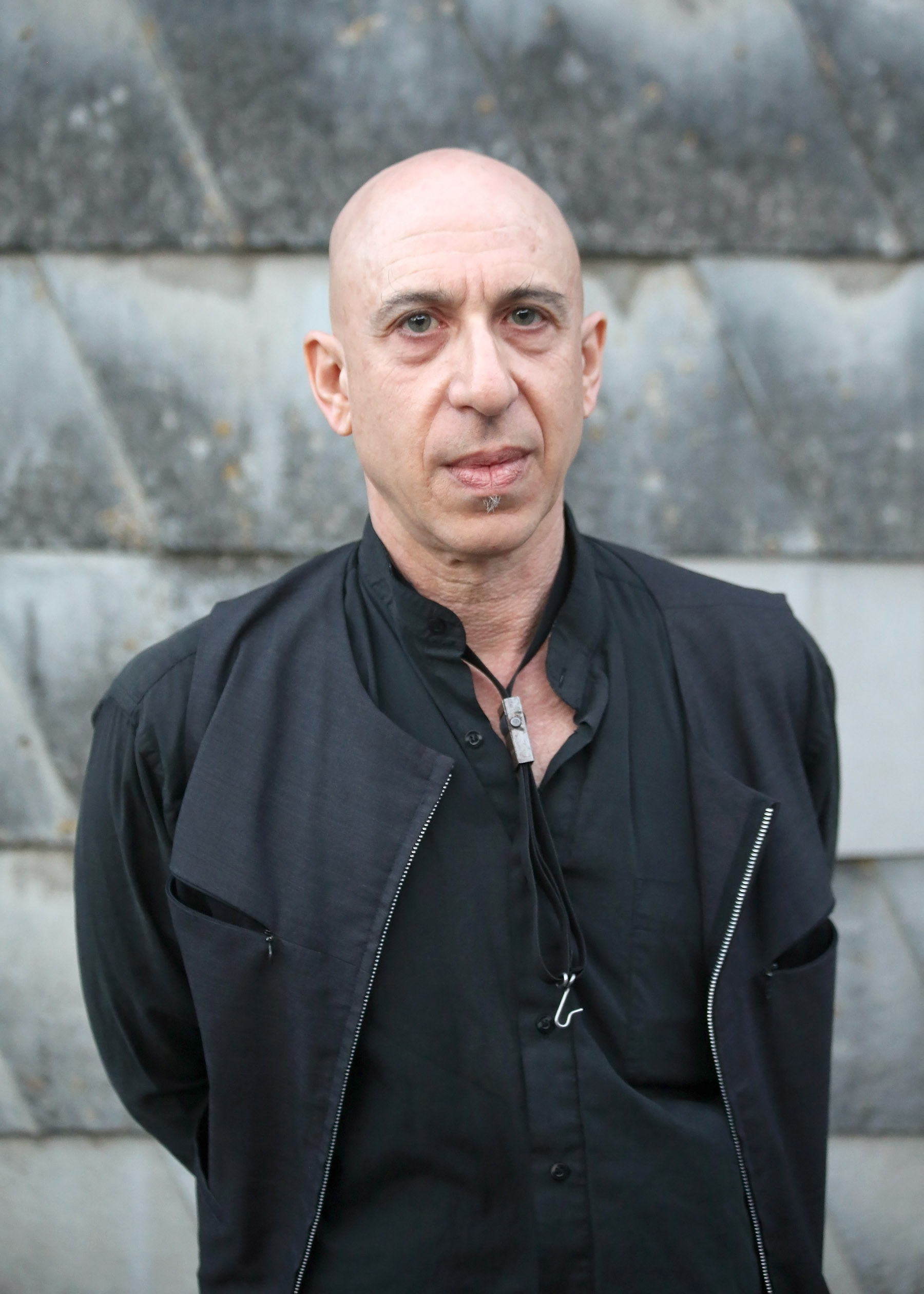

Background information
- Born: March 1, 1951 (age 75); Cleveland, Ohio, U.S.
- Genres: Contemporary classical, experimental, free improvisation, jazz, avant-garde
- Occupations: Composer, musician, producer
- Instruments: Guitar, tenor saxophone, bass clarinet
- Years active: 1980s–present
- Labels: SST, Tzadik, Clean Feed, Intuition, Homestead, Atavistic, Intakt, Extreme, Knitting Factory, zOaR
- Spouse: Janene Higgins
- Website: elliottsharp.com

Elliott Daniel Sharp (born March 1, 1951) is an American contemporary classical composer, multi-instrumentalist, performer, author, and visual artist.

A central figure in the avant-garde and experimental music scene in New York City since the late 1970s, Sharp has released over eighty-five recordings ranging from contemporary classical, avant-garde, free improvisation, jazz, experimental, and orchestral music to noise, no wave, and electronic music. He pioneered the use of personal computers in live performance with his Virtual Stance project of the 1980s. He has used algorithms and fibonacci numbers in experimental composition since the 1970s, and has cited literature as an inspiration for his music and often favors improvisation. He is an inveterate performer, playing mainly guitar, saxophone and bass clarinet. Sharp has led many ensembles over the years, including the blues-oriented Terraplane, Orchestra Carbon, and SysOrk, a group dedicated to the realization of algorithmic and graphic scores.

== Biography ==
Sharp was classically trained in piano from an early age, taking up clarinet and guitar as a teen. He attended Cornell University from 1969 to 1971, studying anthropology, music, and electronics. He completed his B.A. degree at Bard College in 1973, where he studied composition with Benjamin Boretz and Elie Yarden; jazz composition, improvisation, and ethnomusicology with trombonist Roswell Rudd; and physics and electronics with Burton Brody. In 1977 he received an M.A. from the University at Buffalo, where he studied composition with Morton Feldman and Lejaren Hiller, and ethnomusicology with Charles Keil.

From the late 1970s, Sharp established himself internationally. His compositions have been performed by the JACK Quartet, Kronos Quartet, Ensemble Musikfabrik, the hr-Sinfonieorchester, the Ensemble Modern, Continuum, the Orchestra of the SEM Ensemble, the FLUX Quartet, Zeitkratzer, the Soldier String Quartet, and Grammy-winning violinist Hilary Hahn. His work has been featured at festivals worldwide, including Other Minds in San Francisco 2021, the 2018 RuhrTriennale, Huddersfield 2018, MaerzMuzik Berlin 2014, Tomorrow Festival Shenzhen 2012, New Music Stockholm festival 2008, Donaueschingen Festival 2007, Hessischer Rundfunk Klangbiennale 2007, Venice Biennale 2003 & 2006, and Darmstädter Ferienkurse fur Neue Musik 2003.

He has collaborated regularly with many people, including Christian Marclay, Nels Cline, Bobby Previte, Z'EV, Joey Baron, David Torn, Eric Mingus, Zeena Parkins, Vernon Reid, and Frances-Marie Uitti, as well as qawwali singer Nusrat Fateh Ali Khan, blues legend Hubert Sumlin, actor/writer Eric Bogosian, jazz greats Jack DeJohnette and Sonny Sharrock, pop singer Debbie Harry, and Bachir Attar, leader of the Master Musicians of Jajouka. He was curator of the monumental sound-art exhibition ‘’Volume: Bed of Sound’’ for MoMA PS1, which featured the works of 54 artists including Vito Acconci, Tod Dockstader, John Duncan, Walter Murch, Muhal Richard Abrams, Laurie Anderson, Chris & Cosey, Survival Research Laboratories, Ryuichi Sakamoto, Sonic Youth, and Butch Morris.

He produces records for a wide variety of artists, and has curated several State of the Union CDs, compilations of one-minute tracks by experimental musicians. He releases music under his own label, zOaR music, as well as punk label SST and downtown music labels such as Knitting Factory records and John Zorn’s Tzadik label. Sharp describes himself as a lifelong "science geek", having modified and created musical instruments since his teen years, and frequently borrowing terms from science and technology for his compositions.

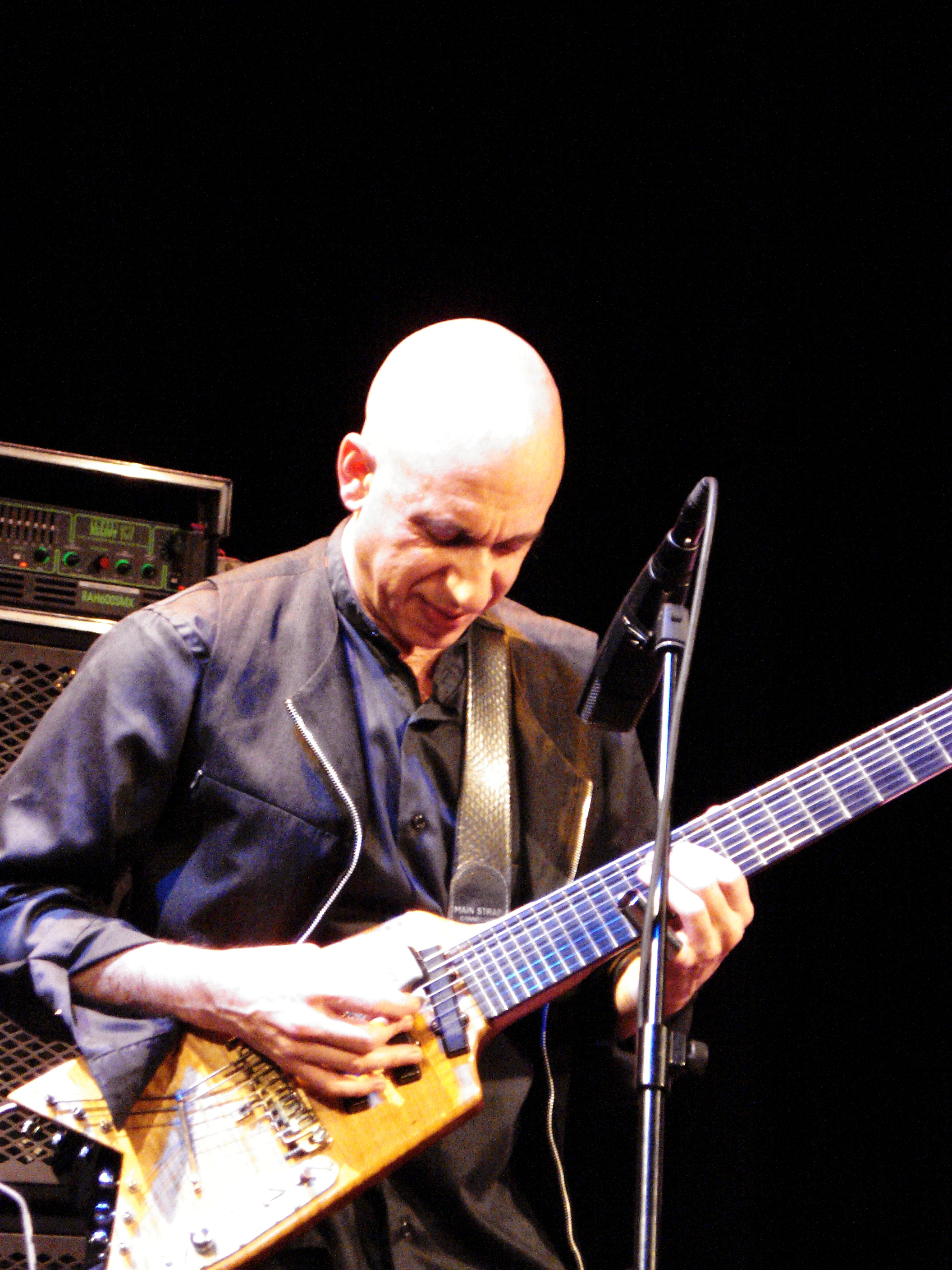
Elliott Sharp live at Jazz Festival in Saalfelden, 2009

Sharp received the 2015 Berlin Prize in Musical Composition, spending six months as a Fellow-in-Residence at the American Academy in Berlin. He was awarded a 2014 Guggenheim Fellowship, was a 2009 Master Artist-in-Residence at the Atlantic Center for the Arts, a New York Foundation for the Arts Fellow in music in 2010 and 2019, and received a 2003 Foundation for Contemporary Arts Grants to Artists Award. He has composed scores for feature films and documentaries, created music and sound-design for The Sundance Channel, MTV and Bravo networks; and has presented numerous sound installations in art galleries and museums. Guitar Player magazine’s 30th anniversary issue included Sharp among their list of “The Dirty Thirty – Pioneers and Trailblazers”.

In March 2011, Sharp's 60th birthday was celebrated with a weekend of all-star concert events entitled "E#@60", hosted by Brooklyn's ISSUE Project Room. In March 2021, his 70th birthday was celebrated with a series of concert events entitled “E#@70”, presented by Brooklyn’s Roulette.

Sharp is married to media artist Janene Higgins. They live in lower Manhattan with their two children.

== Selected Discography ==
=== Solo ===
- The Collapsed Wave (2023)
- Steppe (2023)
- Octal: Book Four (2022)
- Karman Lines (2021)
- Isosceles (2020)
- Cryptid Fragments 1991-1996 (2020)
- Octal Book Three (2014) for solo 8-string guitarbass
- The Yahoos Trilogy (2013)
- Octal Book Two (2010)
- Tectonics – Abstraction Distraction (2010)
- Concert in Dachau (2008)
- Octal Book One (2008)
- Solo Beijing (2007)
- Sharp? Monk? Sharp! Monk! (2006)
- Quadrature (2005)
- Velocity of Hue (2004)
- Tectonics – Errata (1999)
- Tectonics – Field and Stream (1997)
- Sferics (1996)
- Tectonics (1995)
- Westwerk (1992)
- K!L!A!V! (1990)
- Looppool (1988)
- Rhythms and Blues (1980)
- Resonance (1979)

=== As a leader ===
- Nots (1981) with Art Baron, Olu Dara, Bill Laswell, Diana Meckley, M.E. Miller, Charles K. Noyes, Phillip Wilson
- I/S/M:R (1982) with Michael Brown, Al Diaz, David Linton
- In the Land of the Yahoos (1987) with Christoph Anders, Sussan Deihim, Elizabeth Fischer, David Fulton, Paul Garrin, Shelley Hirsch, Shigeto Kamada, Christian Marclay, Jane Tomkiewicz
- Beneath the Valley of the Ultra-Yahoos (1992) with Samm Bennett, Alva Rogers, Anthony Coleman, Victor Poison-Tete, Eugene Chadbourne, Sussan Deihim, Shelley Hirsch, Barbara Barg, K.J. Grant, Lee Ann Brown
- Dyners Club Guitar Quartet (1994) with Roger Kleier, David Mecionis, John Myers
- Boodlers (1995) with Fred Chalenor, Henry Franzoni
- Boodlers – Counter Fit (1997) with Fred Chalenor, Henry Franzoni, Joseph Trump
- Arc 1: I/S/M (1996) with Art Baron, Michael Brown, Al Diaz, Olu Dara, Bill Laswell, David Linton, Diana Meckley, M.E. Miller, Charles K. Noyes, Bobby Previte, Phillip Wilson
- Arc 2: The Seventies (1998) with, Steve Piccolo, Geoff MacAdie, Stewart Gilbert, Kunda Magenau, Denis Williamson, Murry Kohn, Donald Knaack, Bobby Previte, Jim Whittemore, Chris Vine
- Arc 3: Cyberpunk & the Virtual Stance (1998)
- Autar (2000) with the Bedouin Musicians of Muhammad Abu-Ajaj
- Raw Meet (2002) with Melvin Gibbs, Lance Carter
- Radio Hyper-Yahoo (2004) with Tracie Morris, Eric Bogosian, Sim Cain, Maggie Estep, Steve Buscemi, Lisa Lowell, Jack Womack, Eszter Balint, Edwin Torres, Eric Mingus, Steve Piccolo, Gak Sato
- War Zones (2008)
- Christian Marclay: Graffiti Composition (2010) Elliott Sharp, Melvin Gibbs, Mary Halvorson, Lee Ranaldo, Vernon Reid
- Electric Willie: a Tribute to Willie Dixon (2010) Elliott Sharp, Henry Kaiser, Eric Mingus, Queen Esther, Glenn Phillips, Melvin Gibbs, Lance Carter (Yellowbird)
- Err Guitar (2017)
- Syzygy (2019)

=== with Carbon ===
- Monster Curve (1982)
- Datacide (1989)
- Sili/contemp/tation (1990)
- Tocsin (1991)
- Truthtable (1993)
- Autoboot (1994)
- Amusia (1994)
- Interference (1995)
- Serrate (2009)
- Void Coordinates (2010)
- Amsterdam Live 2010 (2023)

=== with Orchestra Carbon ===
- Larynx (1988, 2007)
- Abstract Repressionism: 1990–99 (1992)
- Spring & Neap (1997)
- Rheo~Umbra (1998)
- SyndaKit (1999)
- Radiolaria (2001)
- Quarks Swim Free (2006)

=== String Quartets ===
- Hammer, Anvil, Stirrup (1987) with Soldier String Quartet and Carbon
- Twistmap (1991) with Soldier String Quartet
- Cryptid Fragments (1993) with Margaret Parkins, Michelle Kinney, Sara Parkins, and Soldier String Quartet
- Digital (1986) on Short Stories
- XenocodeX (1996) with Soldier String Quartet
- A Modicum of Passion (2004) with (vocals) Devorah Day, Ben Miller, Eric Mingus, Joan Wasser; and (strings) Stephanie Griffin, Conrad Harris, Amy Kimball, Garo Yellin
- Elliott Sharp String Quartets 1986–1996 (2003) with Soldier String Quartet and The Meridian Quartet
- The Boreal (2009) performed and recorded by JACK Quartet
- Tranzience (2013) performed and recorded by JACK Quartet
- Akheron (2014) premiered by JACK Quartet

=== Orchestral ===
- Racing Hearts, Tessalation Row, Calling (2003)
- Plastovy Hrad (2018) commissioned by Brno Contemporary Orchestra and conducted by Pavel Snajdr.
- Oceanus Procellarum commissioned and premiered by Ensemble Resonanz, Kampnagel, Hamburg and Huddersfield Festival, UK.
- Occam's Machete (2023) premiered by Sharp's SysOrk string ensemble

=== w/SysOrk ===
- Sylva Sylvarum 2014 (2020)
- ReGenerate (2021)
- Flexagons 2014 (2022)

=== with Terraplane ===
- Terraplane (1994)
- Terraplane – Blues for Next (2000)
- Terraplane – Music fr Yellowman (2002)
- Terraplane – Do the Don't (2003) with Hubert Sumlin
- Terraplane – Secret Life (2005)
- Terraplane – Forgery (2008)
- Terraplane – Sky Road Songs (2012) with Hubert Sumlin
- Terraplane – 4AM Always (2014) – Winner of the Jahrespreis from Deutsche Schallplattenkritik
- Kick It Six (2020)
- Century (2021)

=== Duos ===
- In New York (1990) with Bachir Attar
- Psycho~Acoustic (1994) with Zeena Parkins
- Psycho~Acoustic – Blackburst (1996) with Zeena Parkins
- Hoosegow: Mighty (1996) with Queen Esther
- Improvisations (1997) with Frances-Marie Uitti
- Revenge of the Stuttering Child (1997) with Ronny Someck
- Poverty Line (1997) with Ronny Someck
- Rwong Territory (1998) with DJ Soulslinger
- High Noon (1999) with Christian Marclay
- Anostalgia (2002) with Reinhold Friedl
- The Prisoner's Dilemma (2002) with Bobby Previte
- Tongue (2004) with John Duncan
- Volcanic Island (2005) with Yasuhiro Usui
- Tranz (2006) with Merzbow
- Feuchtify (2006) with Reinhold Friedl
- Hums 2 Terre (2007) with Franck Vigroux
- Duo Milano (2007) with Nels Cline
- pi:k (2007) with Charlotte Hug
- BASE (2008) with Antoine Berthaume
- Scharfefelder (2008) with Scott Fields
- Protoplasmic (2009) with Boris Savoldelli
- Afiadacampos (2010) with Scott Fields
- Reflexions (2010) with Michiyo Yagi
- Chansons du crépuscule (2017) with Helene Breschand
- Olso (2019) with John Andrew Wilhite-Hannisdal
- Kumuska (2019) with Saadet Türköz
- Alluvial Plain (2020) with Matthew Evan Taylor
- Peregrinations (2020) with Frances-Marie Uitti
- Duality (2022) with Tracie Morris

=== Collaborative groups ===
- Semantics – Bone of Contention (1987) Elliott Sharp, Ned Rothenberg, Samm Bennett
- Bootstrappers (1989) George Hurley, Mike Watt, Elliott Sharp
- Bootstrappers – GI=GO (1992) Elliott Sharp, Thom Kotik, Jan Kotik
- Downtown Lullaby (1998) John Zorn, Wayne Horvitz, Elliott Sharp, Bobby Previte
- GTR OBLQ (1998) Vernon Reid, Elliott Sharp, David Torn
- Beyond (2001) Joey Baron, Elliott Sharp, Roberto Zorzi
- In the Tank (2006) Natsuki Tamura, Elliott Sharp, Takayuki Kato, Satoko Fujii
- TECK String 4tet (2007) Carlos Zingaro, Elliott Sharp, Ken Filiano, Tomas Ulrich
- Venice, dal vivo (2010) Elliott Sharp, Joey Baron, Franck Vigroux, Bruno Chevillon
- Crossing the Waters (2013) Elliott Sharp, Melvin Gibbs, Lucas Niggli (Intakt)
- Expressed By The Circumference (2019) Elliott Sharp, Álvaro Domene, Michael Caratti
- Evocation (Infrequent Seams, 2022) with Andrew Cyrille and Richard Teitelbaum, recorded in 2011

=== As producer ===
- John Zorn: Spy Vs Spy (Nonesuch, 1988)
- Mofungo: Bugged (SST, 1988)
- N.A.D + Sonny Sharrock, Denardo Coleman, Henry Kaiser, Christian Marclay, Fred Frith: Ghosts (Heron, 1989)
- Mofungo: Work (SST, 1989)
- Kazamaki/Laar: Return to Street Level (Ear-Rational, 1990)
- The Frigg: Frigg: Brecht (Knitting Factory, 1999)
- PAK: 100% Human Hair (Ra Sounds, 2007)
- Christian Marclay: Graffiti Composition (Dog W/A Bone, 2010)
- Binibon (radio play, produced and directed) (Henceforth, 2010)
- Hubert Sumlin - New York 95 (2020)
- Los Desinhibidos (2022)

=== As a compilation producer ===
- Peripheral Vision (zOaR, 1982)
- State of the Union (zOaR, 1992)
- Island of Sanity (No Man's Land, 1987)
- Real Estate (Ear-Rational, 1990)
- State of the Union (MuWorks, 1993)
- State of the Union (Atavistic, 1996)
- State of the Union 2.001 (Electronic Music Foundation, 2001)
- Timebomb: Live at the Clocktower Gallery (MoMA PS1, 1997)
- Secular Steel (Gaff Music, 2004)
- I Never Met a Guitar (Clean Feed, 2010)

=== Recorded film scores and score compilations ===
- Figure Ground (compilation) (1997)
- Suspension of Disbelief (compilation) (2001)
- Soundtrack for the film Commune (2005)
- Soundtrack for the film What Sebastian Dreamt (2005)
- Q-Mix (2009)
- Spectropia Suite (2010) Score to the sci-fi feature film by Toni Dove performed by the 31 Band, Sirius String Quartet, and special guest Debbie Harry

== Filmography ==
=== Film appearances ===
- Elliott Sharp: Doing the Don't (2008 DVD documentary)
- The Old, Weird America: Harry Smith's Anthology of American Folk Music (2007 DVD)
- Elliott Sharp: The Velocity of Hue. Live in Cologne (2007 DVD)
- April in New York with Bobby Previte (2007 DVD)
- Roulette TV: Elliott Sharp. Roulette Intermedium Inc. (2000 DVD)
- Record Player: Christian Marclay (2000 DVD)

=== Music composed for film ===
- Spectropia (2006)
- Commune (2005)
- The Time We Killed (2004)
- What Sebastian Dreamt (2003)
- Daddy and the Muscle Academy (1991)
- Antigone/Rites of Passion (1990)
- The Salt Mines (1990)

== Opera and theater ==
- Innosense (1981)
- Em/Pyre (2006)
- Binibon (2009)
- About Us (2010)
- Port Bou (2014)
- Instant Opera (2017)
- Filiseti Mekidesi (2018)
- Die Grösste Fuge (2021)
- SUBSTANCE: The Infinite Spinoza (2026)

== Bibliography ==
- Morton Subotnick: We Are Who We Invent (2023 - TapeOp Nr. 255)
- Peter K. Siegel: Quietly changing American Music (2022 - Please Kill Me).
- Hubert Sumlin: Howlin' Wolf's Secret Weapon (2022 - Please Kill Me).
- Skull Forming: Tim Wright interview by Elliott Sharp (2021 - Please Kill Me).
- IrRational Music (2019 - TerraNova Press): mix of memoir, music theory, and cultural discussion.
- Epiphanies - Vong Co Guitar The Wire (magazine) December 2018

== Installations ==
- Chorale (2019): 8-channel sound installation at Geoff Stern Art Space, Berlin.
- Suspension (2004): 2-channel installation of video and sound exploring the awareness of momentary stillness in the metropolis. Collaboration with video artist Janene Higgins, for The Chelsea Art Museum, NYC.
- Fluvial (2002): A system for flowing audio to create moving sound currents within the enclosed space of the Engine 27 gallery in NYC, Fluvial uses randomization, filtering, and feedback as its basic processing elements to make full use of the room's spatialization potential.
- Chromatine (2001): Both musical instrument and sculpture, encouraging visitors to touch the sculpture and cause it to play music. For the Gallery of the School of Museum of Fine Arts, Boston.
- Tag (1997): An interactive audio installation created for the Departure Lounge exhibition at the Clocktower Gallery of MoMA PS1, New York City.
- Distressed Vivaldi (1996): Soundtrack created for the Model Home exhibition at the Clocktower Gallery of MoMA PS1, New York City.
