= Record Without a Cover =

- A damaged copy of the album

Studio album by Christian Marclay
- Released: 1985
- Recorded: March 1985
- Genre: Free improvisation; collage; musique concrète; sonic art
- Label: Recycled

Christian Marclay chronology
Record Without a Cover (1985)	Footsteps (1989)

Record Without a Cover is an album by artist Christian Marclay. It was released in 1985 by Recycled Records. An improvised sound collage, the album was sold as an LP record with no cover or protective packaging, such that the damage from shipping, storing, and playing the record becomes a part of the work.

== Background and composition ==
Marclay recorded Record Without a Cover in New York City with a four-track machine. The album has only one untitled track, which opens with a ten-minute section of silence. During this period, the record contains audio artifacts from multiple vinyl records being played, a sound that gradually grows louder. Marclay then introduces drums and bells, which leads into samples including classical music, a tango, various sound effects, and "Caravan" by Duke Ellington. Toward the end of the record, the clicks and pops from the introduction interrupt the samples for two minutes.

Record Without a Cover was sold without any packaging, such that the wear and tear on it gradually transformed the sound of each copy. The record's reverse side is printed with instructions not to "store in a protective package", which gradually becomes less legible as the record is played repeatedly. The record's transformation can be interpreted as a form of spontaneous composition, with each copy becoming a distinct performance. Marclay wanted to ensure that "you can't ignore the medium", and the evolving sound of the record blurs what he originally recorded with the way in which the record has physically changed.

Discussing the impact of Michael Snow's films on his work, Marclay cited Wavelength (1967) as another piece in which the audience moves "between being fooled and being aware of the illusion." He noted that both artists focused on their medium's technical elements to draw the audience's attention to it. Music journalist Alan Licht offered Bruce Conner's films as a comparison. Licht drew a parallel between the silent beginning of Record Without a Cover and Conner's 1958 collage film A Movie, which opens with an extended cut of its title card. Juan A. Suárez writes that the album is "as much Marclay's collage of turntable manipulations as the crackling and popping caused by the gradual deterioration of the unprotected vinyl"; in this regard, they suggest George Landow's 1966 Film in Which There Appear... as a precedent.

== Release and legacy ==
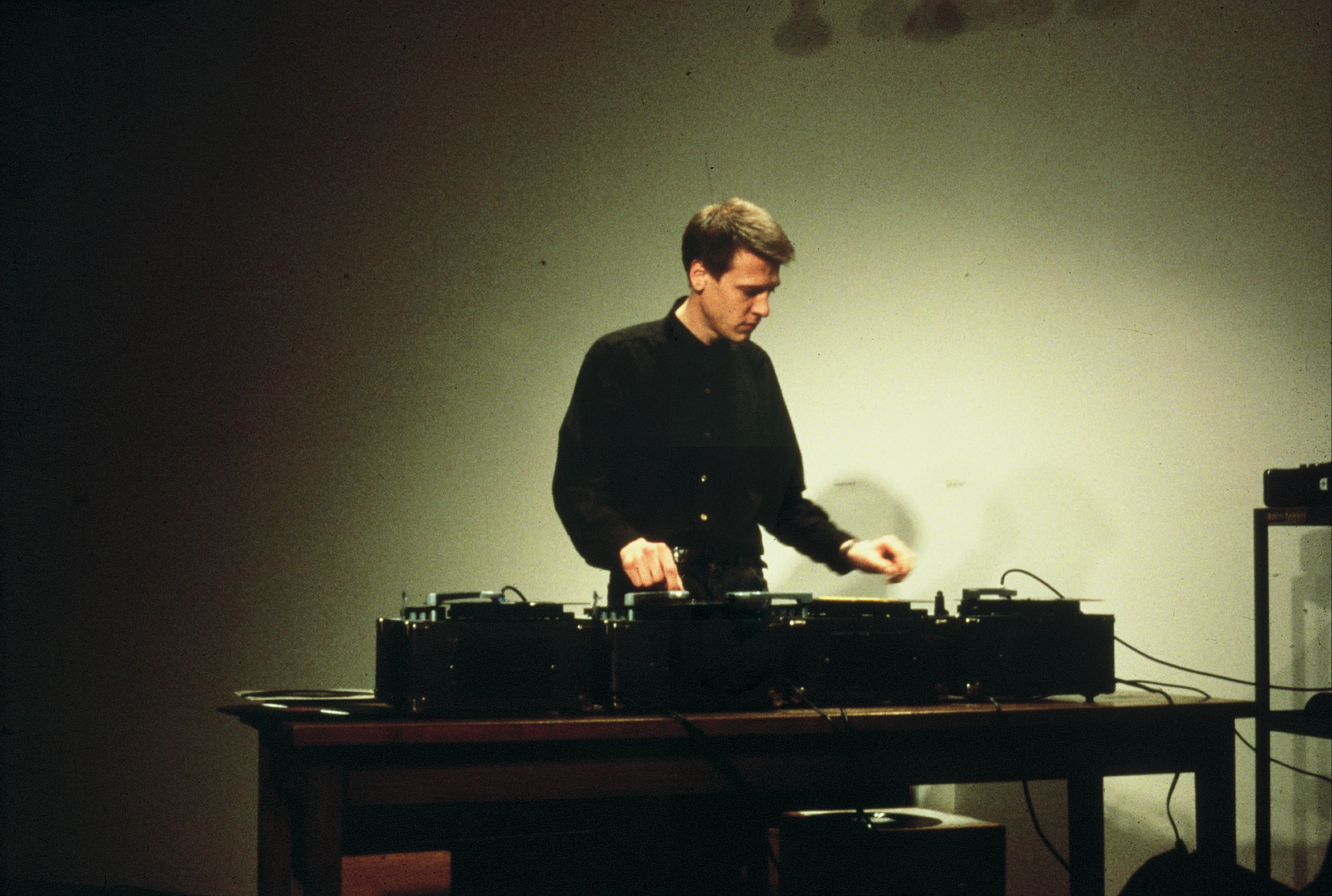
Marclay promoted the record's release with a performance at Hallwalls.

With the support of the Hallwalls Contemporary Arts Center's performance program, Record Without a Cover was originally released in 1985 by Recycled Records. It was distributed through the New Music Distribution Service. The album sold several thousand copies. It has since become a collector's item, particularly among vinyl aficionados. Japanese label Locus Solus reissued Record Without a Cover in 1999. The reissue was pressed on white vinyl, making it noisier than the original.

The Wire included the album in its list of "100 Records That Set the World on Fire". Tank magazine characterized Record Without a Cover as "one of the most important moments in the history of 20th century sonic art", likening its "conceptual neatness" to John Cage's composition 4′33″. In 2008 Japanese musician Otomo Yoshihide paid homage to the album. For his installation "Without Records", Yoshihide dragged styluses across turntables without any vinyl.
