= Janene Higgins =

American artist

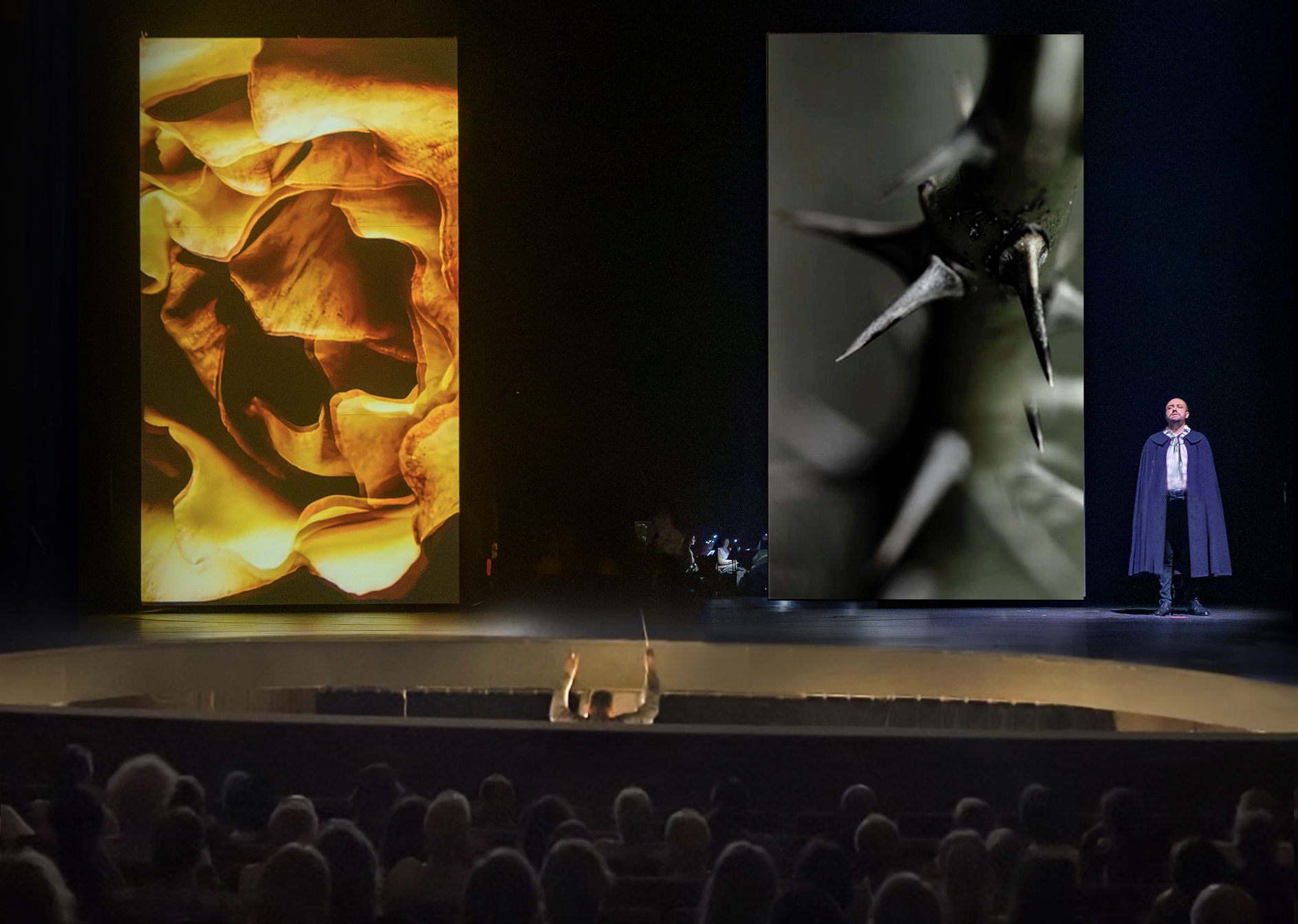
Higgins' projection design for the Elliott Sharp opera ‘’SUBSTANCE: The Infinite Spinoza’’, world premiere at New Opera Days Ostrava (Czech Republic) 2026.

Janene Higgins is an American media artist whose work focuses on print, motion design, and video art. She was an art director at Vanity Fair magazine and RCA Music Group; her video Over Water: Transitive States was presented at the Venice Biennale of Architecture 2021, and her projection design for the opera Die Grösste Fuge premiered at the Beethoven festival "BTHVN 2020" in Bonn, Germany. She is a 2026 recipient of the New York State Council on the Arts (NYSCA) Support for Artists Award grant.

Higgins' career began in editorial design, where she held positions at Esquire, Fame, and Working Woman, culminating in three years as a designer for Vanity Fair. As an art director for Polygram, she designed the CD cover and soundtrack package for the Larry Clark film KIDS. At RCA Music Group, she oversaw the art direction of over 100 CDs and corresponding marketing collateral. She worked on motion design projects for Marc by Marc Jacobs, Condé Nast Publications, and Saks Fifth Avenue.

Commercial motion design projects led Higgins to video art. She collaborated with numerous composers and improvisors of New Music, in live video performance, single channel video, installation, and projection design for theater. Her work has been performed and exhibited at the Ruhrtriennale, The New York Video Festival at Lincoln Center; Documenta in Kassel, Germany; The Museum of Contemporary Art, Lyon; City of Women festival, Slovenia; and NYC performance venues Roulette, Experimental Intermedia, and Eyebeam Art + Technology Center. Her video and projection design were in the operas Binibon, Port Bou, Filiseti Mekidesi, and Die Grosste Fuge.

Higgins has organized seven events for MOMA PS1’s Clocktower Gallery in Tribeca, NYC. These included “Release”, an evening of solo performances by a sampling of New York noise musicians; and “Timebomb”, a four-night series of music, poetry, film/video, and cyberculture. This series was documented in the CD release Timebomb: Live At The Clocktower Gallery issued by PS1 Contemporary Art Center.
