= Christian Marclay =

Swiss-American visual artist and composer

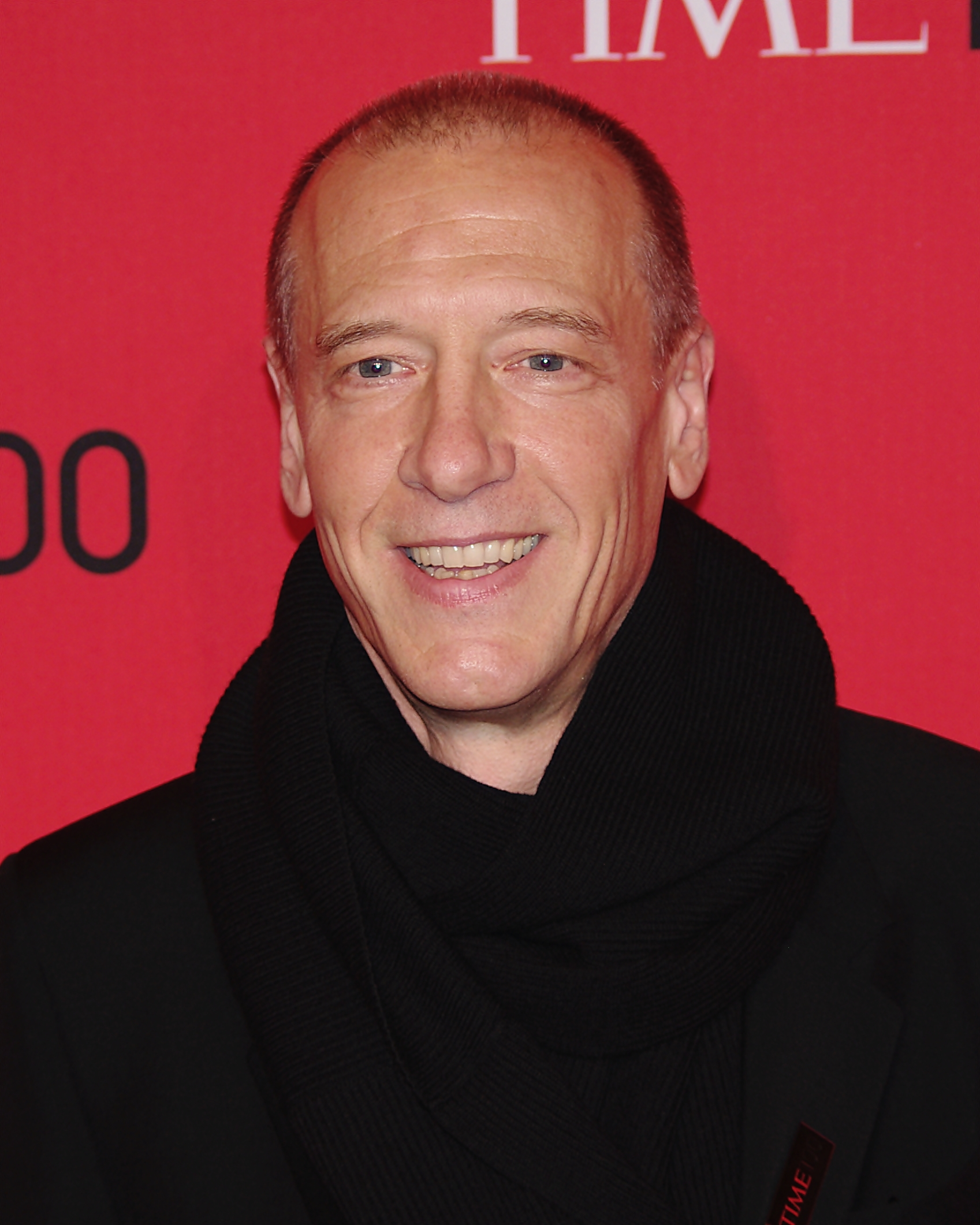
- Marclay in 2012
- Born: Christian Marclay; 11 January 1955 (age 71); San Rafael, California, U.S.
- Known for: Visual artist, composer
- Notable work: The Clock

Christian Marclay (born January 11, 1955) is a visual artist and composer. He holds both American and Swiss nationality.

Marclay's work explores connections between sound art, noise music, photography, video art, film and digital animations. A pioneer of using gramophone records and turntables as musical instruments to create sound collages, Marclay is, in the words of critic Thom Jurek, perhaps the "unwitting inventor of turntablism." His own use of turntables and records, beginning in the late 1970s, was developed independently of but roughly parallel to hip hop's use of the instrument.

== Early life and education ==
Christian Marclay was born on January 11, 1955, in San Rafael, Marin County, California, to a Swiss father and an American mother and raised in Geneva, Switzerland. He studied at the Ecole Supérieure d'Art Visuel in Geneva (1975–1977), the Massachusetts College of Art and Design in Boston (1977–1980, Bachelor of Fine Arts) in the Studio for Interrelated Media Program, and the Cooper Union in New York (1978). As a student he was notably interested in Joseph Beuys and the Fluxus movement of the 1960s and 1970s. Long based in Manhattan, Marclay has in recent years divided his time between New York and London.

== Work ==
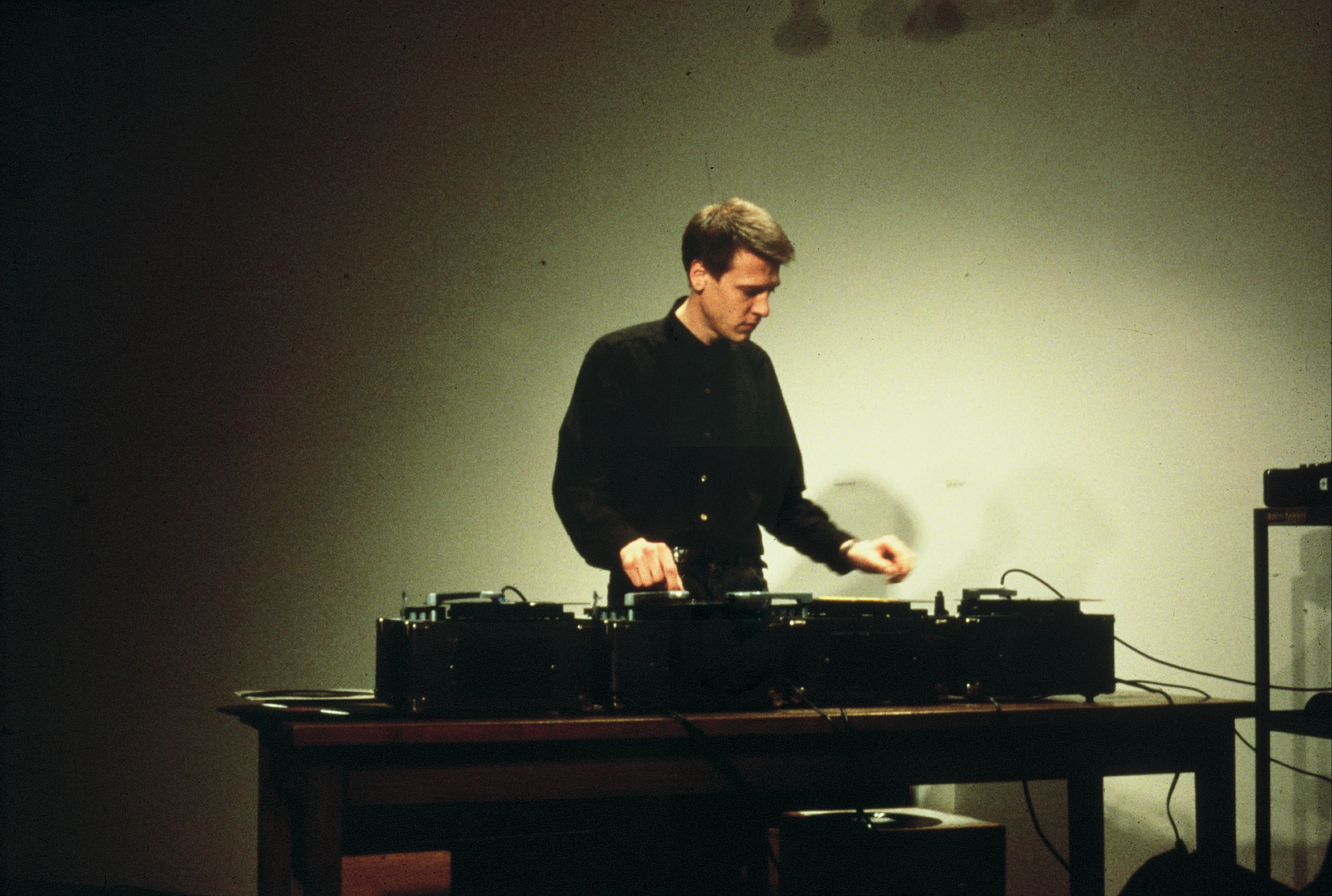
Marclay in 1985

=== Sound work ===
Citing the influence of John Cage, Yoko Ono and Vito Acconci, Marclay has long explored the rituals around making and collecting music. Drawn to the energy of punk rock, he began creating songs, singing to music on pre-recorded backing tapes. In 1979, he formed a punk rock band called Bachelors Even with his friend, guitarist Kurt Henry. Unable to recruit a drummer for the band, Marclay used the regular rhythms of a skipping LP record as a percussion instrument. These duos with Henry might be the first time a musician used records and turntables as interactive, improvising musical instruments.

Marclay sometimes manipulates or damages records to produce continuous loops and skips, and has said he generally prefers inexpensive used records purchased at thrift shops, as opposed to other turntablists who often seek out specific recordings. In 1998, he claimed never to have paid more than US$1 for a record. Marclay has occasionally cut and re-joined different LP records; when played on a turntable, these re-assembled records will combine snippets of different music in quick succession along with clicks or pops from the seams – typical of noise music – and when the original LPs were made of differently-colored vinyl, the reassembled LPs can themselves be considered as works of art. Thom Jurek wrote that: "While many intellectuals have made wild pronouncements about Marclay and his art...they never seem to mention that these sound collages of his are charming, very human, and quite often intentionally hilarious."

Some of Marclay's musical pieces are carefully recorded and edited plunderphonics-style; he is also active in free improvisation. He was filmed performing a duo with Erikm for the documentary Scratch. His scene didn't make the final cut, but is included among the DVD extras.

Marclay released Record Without a Cover on Recycled Records in 1985, "...designed to be sold without a jacket, not even a sleeve!" Accumulating dust and fingerprints would enhance the sound. A review in Spin at the time cited Marclay's "coolest theatrical gesture" in his live performances of phonoguitar: the artist strapped a record player onto himself and played, for example, a Jimi Hendrix album. In his artwork Five Cubes (1989), he melted vinyl records into cubes.

The Sound of Silence (1988) is a black-and-white photograph of the Simon & Garfunkel single of the same title.

Shuffle (2007) and Ephemera (2009) are also musical scores.

In addition to his solo performances and recordings, Marclay has collaborated with many musicians, including John Zorn, William Hooker, Elliott Sharp, Otomo Yoshihide, Butch Morris, Shelley Hirsch, Flo Kaufmann and Crevice; he has also performed with the group Sonic Youth, and in other projects with Sonic Youth's members.

=== Visual art ===
Marclay has in more recent years produced visual art, although usually of representations of sound, or the various technologies of representing sound. His Graffiti Composition (2002) posted musical notes on walls around Berlin, compiled photographs of them as they faded, and is performed in concert.

During his residency at Eyebeam, Marclay created Screen Play (2005), a twenty minute video of black and white images overlaid with colourful computer graphics. For Performa 05, the first edition of the Performa Biennial, two ensembles and one soloist interpreted Screen Play.

In Sound Holes (2007), he photographed the many patterns of speaker holes on intercoms.

From 2007-2009, Marclay worked with cyanotype at Graphicstudio to capture the motion of cassette tapes unspooling. An interest in onomatopoeia dating back to 1989 also culminated in his monumental Manga Scroll (2010), a 60-foot scroll of cartoon interjections that doubles as a musical score.

In 2016, he produced Made to Be Destroyed, a compilation of film clips showing the destruction of art works or buildings.

==== The Clock (2010) ====
In 2010, he produced The Clock, a 24-hour compilation of time-related scenes from movies, unfolding in real time, that debuted at London's White Cube gallery in 2010. The clips used span a century of cinema across numerous genres. Frieze stated that the "often humorous looped film examines media’s role as both mirror and escape, urging us to confront time as both lived experience and cinematic illusion. In an age ruled by constant broadcasting, live-streaming and artificial intelligence, The Clock feels less like a nostalgic homage to the past than a rigorous depiction of how our obsession with images defines both collective memory and the present."

Marclay made several forays into video art that informed The Clock. His 1995 film Telephones forms a narrative out of clips from Hollywood films where characters use a telephone. His 1998 film Up and Out combines video from Michelangelo Antonioni's Blowup with audio from Brian De Palma's Blow Out. It was an early experiment in the effect of synchronization, where viewers naturally attempted to find intersections between the two works, and it developed the editing style that Marclay employs for The Clock.

The work was named by Frieze as No.23 of "The 25 Best Works of the 21st Century".

== Other activities ==
- Swiss Institute Contemporary Art New York, Member of the Board of Trustees (since 2016)

== Personal life ==
Marclay began dating curator Lydia Yee in 1991, and the couple married in 2011.

== Recognition ==
At the 2011 Venice Biennale, representing the United States, Marclay was recognized as the best artist in the official exhibition, winning the Golden Lion for The Clock. Newsweek responded by naming Marclay one of the ten most important artists of today. Accepting the Golden Lion, Marclay invoked Andy Warhol, thanking the jury "for giving The Clock its fifteen minutes". In 2013, Dale Eisinger of Complex ranked Berlin Mix the 17th best work of performance art in history.

In 2015, the White Cube presented a major solo exhibition including a range of new work and a lively programme of weekly performances played by the London Sinfonietta and guests, including Thurston Moore and Mica Levi.

== Artist books ==
- Ephemera, Bruxelles, mfc-michèle didier, 2009. Limited edition of 90 numbered and signed copies and 10 artist’s proofs. Voir mfc-michèle didier
