= Francesco Levato =

American poet

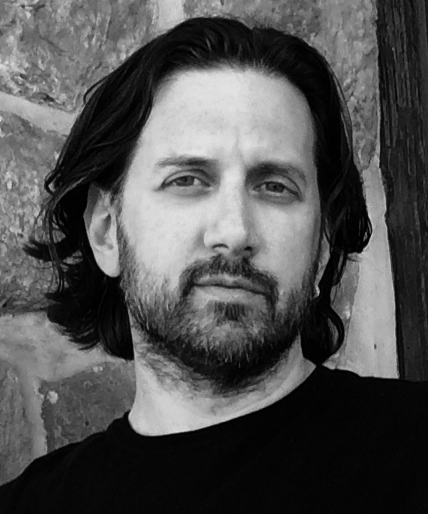

Francesco Levato is a poet, a translator, and a new media artist. He received his MFA in Poetry from New England College and his PhD in English Studies, Poetry, at Illinois State University. He is the founder and director of The Chicago School of Poetics, served as executive director of The Poetry Center of Chicago from 2007 to 2010, and currently serves as Cinépoetry Editor for Poetry International, and associate professor at California State University, San Marcos.

His first collection of poetry, Marginal State (Fractal Edge Press, 2006), was written while living in the Apennine Mountains of Central Italy, in a house once occupied by Spanish mercenaries during the fourteenth century. His book length documentary poem, War Rug (Plastique Press, 2009), was adapted into a poetry film that went on to win Official Selections from the Zebra Poetry Film Festival in Berlin, Germany, and the Potenza International Film Festival , in Potenza, Italy, and was featured at Anthology Film Archives in New York. His first book of translations of Italian poet Tiziano Fratus’ Creaturing was published by Marick Press in 2010, as was his own collection of documentary poems, Elegy for Dead Languages. Variations on Want, a poetry film based on his long poetic sequence of the same name was premiered at the Henry Miller Library, in Big Sur, California, in a collaborative performance with composer Philip Glass in 2011, his e-book, Endless, Beautiful, Exact was published by Argotist e-books in 2011, and his chapbook, jettison/collapse was published by Angel House Press in 2015. During the summer of 2015, while living in the Bolivian Andes, he began translating the work of underrepresented Bolivian poets.

Levato was born in Chicago, Illinois.

== Awards ==
- 2013 Ahsahta Chapbook Contest, “Variations on Want,” finalist, K Silem Mohammad, judge, 2013
- NewFilmmakers at Anthology Film Archives, “War Rug,” official selection, 2010, NYC
- Zebra Poetry Film Festival, “War Rug,” official selection, 2010, Berlin
- Potenza International Film Festival, “War Rug,” official selection, 2009

== Works ==
- pxc001: A Twitter-based Collaborative Poem (2015)
- jettison/collapse (Angel House Press, 2015)
- Machines of Dissymmetry: An interactive multimedia performance (Technoculture, 2014)
- Semi-peripheral (3D): A critical-creative videogame (2014)
- My Sunset Gun: An interactive multimedia performance (Certain Circuits, 2013)
- Endless, Beautiful, Exact (Argotist Ebooks, 2011)
- Variations on Want: A poetry film (BathHouse Hypermedia Journal, 2011)
- Elegy for Dead Languages (Marick Press, 2010)
- War Rug: The Poetry Film (Tygerburning, 2010)
- War Rug: A book length documentary poem (Plastique Press, 2009)
- Creaturing by Tiziano Fratus, translated from the Italian by Francesco Levato (Marick Press, 2010)
- Marginal State (Fractal Edge Press, 2006)

== Reviews ==
“Francesco Levato’s powerful documentary, War Rug; like Eliot Weinberger’s What I heard about Iraq before it, detains the language of the perpetrators of global military aggression and redeploys it to indict them. From J.C. Penny catalog copy to counterintelligence manuals and autopsy reports, War Rug is a fierce yet unfortunate reminder of the absolute horrors of our age.”—Mark Nowak, author of Coal Mountain Elementary

“Levato's Elegy for Dead Languages, while a more baroque and sculpted collection, is also a powerful testament to modernity. Levato traces the blind-spots of war, particularly controversial American interventions in the Middle East. Elegy for Dead Languages is an imagistic tour de force, and Levato's unsparing lens is just the sort these subjects deserve and require. The collection's poems seem unduly cerebral only if we forget -- as we must never forget -- that these are real appendages being torn apart, real pieties being eviscerated, real landscapes being ravaged. Brian Turner has already given us a view of war from the front lines; Levato's perspective is a more distant but also (perhaps in consequence of its distance) an even more comprehensive one. It is right that we should again be troubled by poetry; and it is right that when poetry troubles us it should move us not merely to emotion but to action. Levato's book meets the high standards not only of testament but also -- albeit in the sociopolitical, rather than militaristic sense -- a call-to-arms. The horrors of war are too easily rendered as Kantian sublimities for which the stateside mind can find no objective correlative; Levato suffuses us, instead, in the facts, figures, and bureaucratic speech out of which real-time horrors are in actuality composed. A necessary and suitably unforgiving book.”—Seth Abramson, Huffington Post

“Politically charged investigation raises the stakes of poetry for both the poet (as producer) and the poem (as art object). This type of poetry not only invokes the bardic practice of speaking the wisdom of the group, but also uses the poem as a type of activism. When critics question the role of poetry in the real world or what it can accomplish outside of its own existence, activist poetics that enters conversation with contemporary political happenings offers one of the better answers. This activist poetry can reveal knowledge about real happenings through the conceptual relationship between the real and the world of art.” —Steve Halle, A review of “War Rug,” Jacket2

“Levato is himself an avant-garde poet whose work draws on cinematic and documentary techniques—in his own words, “engages subject matter through disruption of content and form, fragmentation of narrative and radical juxtaposition of visual and textual elements.” His poems, truly products of postmodern culture, sample: they collect, cut and redistribute pieces of other poems into new configurations. One long work, “Aurora,” makes a fragmented, haunting dialogue of pieces of Robert Browning's and Elizabeth Barrett Browning's poems. A significant part of Levato's work is something called cinépoetry, a kind of collaged videographic poetry that does with footage what his other work does with language. Levato also translates, a kind of work vitally connected to his poetic work, which involves so much transformation of extant materials into new forms.”—Alli Carlisle, Outsider Institution: the Avant-Garde Pedagogy of the Chicago School of Poetics
