= Descendant =

Descendant(s) or descendent(s) may refer to:

- Lineal descendant, a consanguinous (i.e. biological) relative directly related to a person
  - Collateral descendant, a relative descended from a brother or sister of an ancestor

== Books ==
- "The Descendant" (short story), a short story by early 20th-century science-fiction writer H. P. Lovecraft
- The Descendants (novel), a 2007 novel by Kaui Hart Hemmings

== Film and television ==
- Descendant (2003 film), a thriller film starring Katherine Heigl and Jeremy London
- Descendants (2008 film), an animated short film, Winner Tokyo Anime Award 2009
- Descendents (2008 film), a Chilean experimental horror film
- The Descendants, a 2011 American drama film directed by Alexander Payne with George Clooney
- The Descendants (2015 film), an Iranian film directed by Yaser Talebi
- Descendants (franchise), a Disney Channel television film franchise
  - Descendants (2015 film), the television film that started the above franchise
  - Descendants (soundtrack), the soundtrack for the television film
- Descendant (2022 film), Netflix documentary
- Descendants, a Series D episode of the television series QI (2006)
- Descendent (2025 film), a science fiction thriller film

== Other ==
- A type of node (element) in a tree structure
- A subordinate in a hierarchy
- Descendant (astrology), the western horizon-point directly opposite from the eastern horizon; also known as the ascendant (the rising sign); point at which the Sun sets in the west
- Descendents, a punk rock band from southern California

== See also ==
- Descendance, an Australian Aboriginal dance company formed in 1999
- Antonyms:
  - Ascendant
  - Ancestor
