= Ancestor (disambiguation) =

An ancestor is a progenitor from which individuals or groups are descended.

Ancestor, ancestors, or ancestry may also refer to:

== Film, TV, and games ==
- The Ancestor, a 1936 Italian film
- Ancestors (TV series), a public television mini-series on family history
- The Ancestors (Stargate)
- Ancestors: The Humankind Odyssey, a video game developed by Panache Digital Games
- Ancestors (film), a 2026 Irish-British film

== Music ==
- Ancestors (band), a metal band from Los Angeles, California
- Ancestors (Renee Rosnes album), 1995
- Ancestors (Mario Pavone album), 2008
- Ancestors (Wadada Leo Smith album), 2012
- Ancestors (EP), a 1997 EP by Edith Frost
- The Ancestors, an album by Tim Berne
- "Ancestress" (song), a 2022 song by Björk

== Other uses ==
- Ancestor (sculpture), a 1965 public sculpture in Madison, Wisconsin
- Ancestor (novel), a 2006 novel by Scott Sigler

== See also ==
- Ancestry.com, a genealogy website
- Descendant (disambiguation)
- Primitive (disambiguation)
- Progenitor
