= Jim Burke (film producer) =

American film producer

Jim Burke Jr.
- Education: University of Minnesota
- Occupation: Film producer
- Notable work: The Descendants, Green Book
- Awards: Best Picture (2019)

Jim Burke Jr. is an American film producer.

Burke, who is a graduate of the University of Minnesota, was a founding member of Rysher Entertainment. He was the President of Ad Hominem Enterprises, a production company he shared with Alexander Payne and Jim Taylor. The company had a first look deal with Fox Searchlight Pictures. He also served as President of Production at Focus Features.

On January 24, 2012, he was nominated for an Oscar for the movie The Descendants.

In 2019, he won the Academy Award for Best Picture for producing Green Book.

Over his career, Burke has been involved with films that have garnered 27 Academy Award nominations and 7 Oscars.

Burke is living in Hawaii and has nearly completed his final film as a producer. He is married to Christina Simpkins and father to former New York sports broadcaster and current SportsCenter anchor Madelyn Burke.

== Early life and career ==
Burke is the oldest of six children born and raised in Edina, Minnesota. Burke graduated from the University of Minnesota's College of Liberal Arts. In 2011, he was honored with the University's Alumni of Notable Achievement Award.

Prior to his senior year, he arranged for his family to audition for the popular game show Family Feud. Selected as contestants, against all odds, his family won. It was that experience in Los Angeles that enabled Burke to believe a career in show business was achievable.

His first job was as a “satellite jockey” coordinating news and sports satellite feeds. In that job he was introduced to the business of television syndication—the sales of film and television shows to broadcasters nationwide.

=== Lorimar Television / Warner Bros ===
Within a year, he landed a job at Lorimar Television, which soon after was acquired by Warner Bros. During his 7 years at Warner, after watching thousands of Warner Bros. films, Burke grew to become the studio's authority on its vast film library.

=== Rysher Entertainment ===
When the opportunity arose, he followed his dream and pursued a career in filmmaking. He was a founding member of Rysher Entertainment—a fledgling film and television company which soon after scored a notable success with the hit syndicated TV show, Saved By The Bell. The enormous profits that show provided were immediately plowed into a small film slate, primarily for HBO.

Rysher was then bought by Cox Communications and provided with the resources to make a full slate of theatrical films. Over the next 5 years Burke supervised the development, production and release of over 30 films. Some of the most notable were, Primal Fear, Private Parts, Kiss the Girls, The Saint, Kingpin, Big Night, and Hard Eight. The experience was invigorating but impersonal. Burke wanted to get closer to the films and make a stylistic imprint.

=== Ad Hominem ===
While at Rysher, Burke read a script written by two friends entitled Election. It was the best script he had ever read and was driven to getting it made. When making Election he formed a bond with writer Jim Taylor and director Alexander Payne. Sharing the same film aesthetic, the decided to form a production company, Ad Hominem. Ad Hominem, funded by Fox Searchlight, was dedicated to making human films.

At Ad Hominem the trio made several films including The Savages, and Oscar nominated The Descendants, starring George Clooney. Burke spent 7 months in Honolulu while making The Descendants and fell in love with Hawaii's history, culture and people.

=== Focus Features ===
While preparing the film Downsizing, Burke was unexpectedly approached with an offer to become the President of Production for specialized film groundbreaker and Universal Studios-based Focus Features. At Focus he was tasked with making between 4-8 quality films a year. During that time, he developed a film that came to known as Green Book. He felt so strongly about the film that he asked to be let out of his deal to produce the film. Focus graciously agreed in exchange that he sign a “first look deal” with the studio. However, the film was instead released by Universal Pictures and not by Focus Features like it was originally intended.

Green Book went on to be a hit worldwide and was named best picture of the year by the academy, Golden Globes, Producers Guild and many critics organizations.

== Filmography and awards ==
Year	Title	Award	Category	Result	Credit
2022	Dreamin' Wild				Producer
2018	Green Book	Academy Awards	Best Picture	Won	Producer
2018	Green Book	Academy Awards	Best Actor (Viggo Mortensen)	Nominated	Producer
2018	Green Book	Academy Awards	Best Supporting Actor (Mahershala Ali)	Won	Producer
2018	Green Book	Academy Awards	Best Original Screenplay	Won	Producer
2018	Green Book	Academy Awards	Best Film Editing	Nominated	Producer
2018	Green Book	BAFTA Awards	Best Film	Nominated	Producer
2018	Green Book	BAFTA Awards	Best Actor (Viggo Mortensen)	Nominated	Producer
2018	Green Book	BAFTA Awards	Best Supporting Actor (Mahershala Ali)	Won	Producer
2018	Green Book	BAFTA Awards	Best Original Screenplay	Nominated	Producer
2018	Green Book	Golden Globe Awards	Best Picture, Musical or Comedy	Won	Producer
2018	Green Book	Golden Globe Awards	Best Director (Peter Farrelly)	Nominated	Producer
2018	Green Book	Golden Globe Awards	Best Actor, Musical or Comedy (Viggo Mortensen)	Nominated	Producer
2018	Green Book	Golden Globe Awards	Best Supporting Actor (Mahershala Ali)	Won	Producer
2018	Green Book	Golden Globe Awards	Best Screenplay	Won	Producer
2018	Green Book	Producers Guild of America Awards	Outstanding Producing	Won	Producer
2017	Atomic Blonde				Studio Executive
2017	Darkest Hour	Academy Awards	Best Picture	Nominated	Studio Executive
2017	Darkest Hour	Academy Awards	Best Actor (Gary Oldman)	Won	Studio Executive
2017	Darkest Hour	Academy Awards	Best Cinematography	Nominated	Studio Executive
2017	Darkest Hour	Academy Awards	Best Production Design	Nominated	Studio Executive
2017	Darkest Hour	Academy Awards	Best Costume Design	Nominated	Studio Executive
2017	Darkest Hour	Academy Awards	Best Makeup and Hairstyling	Won	Studio Executive
2017	Darkest Hour	BAFTA Awards	Best Film	Nominated	Studio Executive
2017	Darkest Hour	BAFTA Awards	Best British Film	Nominated	Studio Executive
2017	Darkest Hour	BAFTA Awards	Best Actor (Gary Oldman)	Won	Studio Executive
2017	Darkest Hour	BAFTA Awards	Best Supporting Actress (Kristin Scott Thomas)	Nominated	Studio Executive
2017	Darkest Hour	BAFTA Awards	Best Cinematography	Nominated	Studio Executive
2017	Darkest Hour	BAFTA Awards	Best Production Design	Nominated	Studio Executive
2017	Darkest Hour	BAFTA Awards	Best Costume Design	Nominated	Studio Executive
2017	Darkest Hour	BAFTA Awards	Best Makeup and Hair	Won	Studio Executive
2017	Darkest Hour	BAFTA Awards	Best Music	Nominated	Studio Executive
2017	Darkest Hour	Golden Globe Awards	Best Actor, Drama (Gary Oldman)	Won	Studio Executive
2017	Victoria & Abdul	Academy Awards	Best Costume Design	Nominated	Studio Executive
2017	Victoria & Abdul	Academy Awards	Best Makeup and Hairstyling	Nominated	Studio Executive
2017	Victoria & Abdul	BAFTA Awards	Best Makeup & Hair	Nominated	Studio Executive
2017	Downsizing	Golden Globe Awards	Best Supporting Actress (Hong Chau)	Nominated	Studio Executive
2017	The Beguiled				Studio Executive
2017	The Book of Henry				Studio Executive
2017	The Zookeeper's Wife				Studio Executive
2016	A Monster Calls				Studio Executive
2016	Nocturnal Animals	Academy Awards	Best Supporting Actor (Michael Shannon)	Nominated	Studio Executive
2016	Nocturnal Animals	BAFTA Awards	Best Director (Tom Ford)	Nominated	Studio Executive
2016	Nocturnal Animals	BAFTA Awards	Best Actor (Jake Gyllenhaal)	Nominated	Studio Executive
2016	Nocturnal Animals	BAFTA Awards	Best Supporting Actor (Aaron Taylor-Johnson)	Nominated	Studio Executive
2016	Nocturnal Animals	BAFTA Awards	Best Adapted Screenplay	Nominated	Studio Executive
2016	Nocturnal Animals	BAFTA Awards	Best Cinematography	Nominated	Studio Executive
2016	Nocturnal Animals	BAFTA Awards	Best Editing	Nominated	Studio Executive
2016	Nocturnal Animals	BAFTA Awards	Best Production Design	Nominated	Studio Executive
2016	Nocturnal Animals	BAFTA Awards	Best Makeup & Hair	Nominated	Studio Executive
2016	Nocturnal Animals	BAFTA Awards	Best Music	Nominated	Studio Executive
2016	Nocturnal Animals	Golden Globe Awards	Best Director (Tom Ford)	Nominated	Studio Executive
2016	Nocturnal Animals	Golden Globe Awards	Best Supporting Actor (Aaron Taylor-Johnson)	Won	Studio Executive
2016	Nocturnal Animals	Golden Globe Awards	Best Screenplay	Nominated	Studio Executive
2015	The Danish Girl	Academy Awards	Best Actor (Eddie Redmayne)	Nominated	Studio Executive
2015	The Danish Girl	Academy Awards	Best Supporting Actress (Alicia Vikander)	Won	Studio Executive
2015	The Danish Girl	Academy Awards	Best Production Design	Nominated	Studio Executive
2015	The Danish Girl	Academy Awards	Best Costume Design	Nominated	Studio Executive
2015	The Danish Girl	BAFTA Awards	Best British Film	Nominated	Studio Executive
2015	The Danish Girl	BAFTA Awards	Best Actor (Eddie Redmayne)	Nominated	Studio Executive
2015	The Danish Girl	BAFTA Awards	Best Actress (Alicia Vikander)	Nominated	Studio Executive
2015	The Danish Girl	BAFTA Awards	Best Costume Design	Nominated	Studio Executive
2015	The Danish Girl	BAFTA Awards	Best Makeup & Hair	Nominated	Studio Executive
2015	The Danish Girl	Golden Globe Awards	Best Actor, Drama (Eddie Redmayne)	Nominated	Studio Executive
2015	The Danish Girl	Golden Globe Awards	Best Actress, Drama (Alicia Vikander)	Nominated	Studio Executive
2015	The Danish Girl	Golden Globe Awards	Best Original Score	Nominated	Studio Executive
2014	Kumiko, the Treasure Hunter				Producer
2011	The Descendants	Academy Awards	Best Picture	Nominated	Producer
2011	The Descendants	Academy Awards	Best Director (Alexander Payne)	Nominated	Producer
2011	The Descendants	Academy Awards	Best Actor (George Clooney)	Nominated	Producer
2011	The Descendants	Academy Awards	Best Adapted Screenplay	Won	Producer
2011	The Descendants	Academy Awards	Best Editing	Nominated	Producer
2011	The Descendants	BAFTA Awards	Best Film	Nominated	Producer
2011	The Descendants	BAFTA Awards	Best Actor (George Clooney)	Nominated	Producer
2011	The Descendants	BAFTA Awards	Best Adapted Screenplay	Nominated	Producer
2011	The Descendants	Producers Guild of America Awards	Outstanding Producing	Nominated	Producer
2011	The Descendants	Golden Globe Awards	Best Picture, Drama	Won	Producer
2011	The Descendants	Golden Globe Awards	Best Director (Alexander Payne)	Nominated	Producer
2011	The Descendants	Golden Globe Awards	Best Actor (George Clooney)	Won	Producer
2011	The Descendants	Golden Globe Awards	Best Supporting Actress (Shailene Woodley)	Nominated	Producer
2011	The Descendants	Golden Globe Awards	Best Screenplay	Nominated	Producer
2011	Cedar Rapids				Producer
2007	The Savages	Academy Awards	Best Actress (Laura Linney)	Nominated	Executive Producer
2007	The Savages	Academy Awards	Best Adapted Screenplay	Nominated	Executive Producer
2007	The Savages	Golden Globe Awards	Best Actor, Musical or Comedy (Philip Seymour Hoffman)	Nominated	Executive Producer
2004	Walking Tall				Producer
2001	The Breed				Producer
1999	Election	Academy Awards	Best Adapted Screenplay	Nominated	Co-Producer
1999	Election	Golden Globe Awards	Best Actress, Musical or Comedy (Reese Witherspoon)	Nominated	Co-Producer
1999	OneGin	BAFTA Awards	Best British Film	Nominated	Production Executive
1998	The Opposite of Sex	Golden Globe Awards	Best Actress, Musical or Comedy (Christina Ricci)		Production Executive
1997	A Smile Like Yours				Production Executive
1997	The Eighteenth Angel				Executive Producer
1997	Switchback				Production Executive
1997	Kiss The Girls				Production Executive
1997	The Saint				Production Executive
1997	Zeus and Roxanne				Production Executive
1997	Turbulence				Production Executive
1996	Hard Eight				Production Executive
1996	The Evening Star	Golden Globes	Best Supporting Actress (Marion Ross)	Nominated	Production Executive
1996	Dear God				Production Executive
1996	2 Days in the Valley				Co-Producer
1996	Big Night				Production Executive
1996	Foxfire				Production Executive
1996	House Arrest				Production Executive
1996	Escape from L.A				Production Executive
1996	Kingpin				Co-Producer
1996	Primal Fear	Academy Awards	Best Supporting Actor (Edward Norton)	Nominated	Production Executive
1996	Primal Fear	BAFTA Awards	Best Supporting Actor (Edward Norton)	Nominated	Production Executive
1996	Primal Fear	Golden Globe Awards	Best Supporting Actor (Edward Norton)	Won	Production Executive
1995	Chameleon				Production Executive
1995	White Man's Burden				Production Executive
1995	It Takes Two				Production Executive
1995	Let It Be Me				Production Executive
1995	Three Wishes				Production Executive
1995	Perfect Alibi				Production Executive
1995	The Show				Production Executive
1995	Above Suspicion				Production Executive
1995	Destiny Turns on the Radio				Production Executive
1995	Bodily Harm				Production Executive
1994	Judicial Consent				Production Executive
1994	A Passion to Kill				Production Executive
