= Jeff Peterson =

Jeff Peterson may refer to:

- Jeffrey Peterson (born 1972), American technology entrepreneur
- Jeff Peterson (guitarist) (fl. 2000s), American guitarist
- Jeff Peterson Memorial Cup, annual pro-wrestling event of Full Impact Pro

== See also ==
- Geoff Peterson, sidekick character on The Late Late Show with Craig Ferguson
- Jeff Pedersen, a participant on season 1 of Newlyweds: The First Year
