= 69th Golden Globe Awards =

Film award ceremony in 2012

- Official poster
- Date: January 15, 2012
- Site: The Beverly Hilton, Beverly Hills, California, U.S.
- Hosted by: Ricky Gervais

Highlights
- Best Film: Drama: The Descendants
- Best Film: Musical or Comedy: The Artist
- Best Drama Series: Homeland
- Best Musical or Comedy Series: Modern Family
- Best Miniseries or Television movie: Downton Abbey
- Most awards: (3) The Artist
- Most nominations: (6) The Artist

Television coverage
- Network: NBC

The 69th Golden Globe Awards, honoring the best in film and television of 2011, were broadcast live from the Beverly Hilton Hotel in Beverly Hills, California on January 15, 2012, by NBC. The host was Ricky Gervais, for the third consecutive year. The musical theme for the year was composed by Yoshiki, leader of the Japanese band X Japan. The nominations were announced by Woody Harrelson, Sofía Vergara, Gerard Butler and Rashida Jones on December 15, 2011. Multiple winners for the night included the silent film The Artist which won three awards and The Descendants winning two awards. Freshman television series Homeland also won two awards.

== Winners and nominees ==
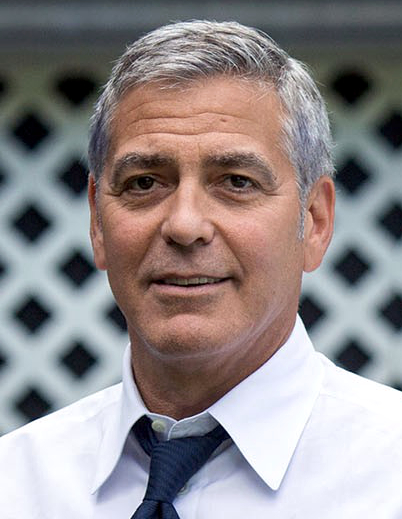
George Clooney, Best Actor in a Motion Picture – Drama winner

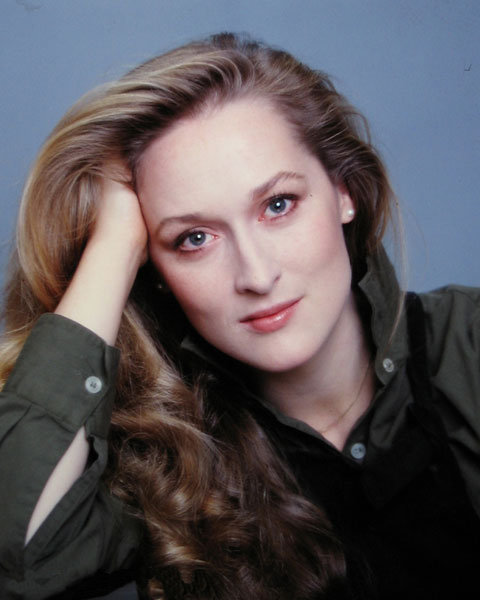
Meryl Streep, Best Actress in a Motion Picture – Drama winner

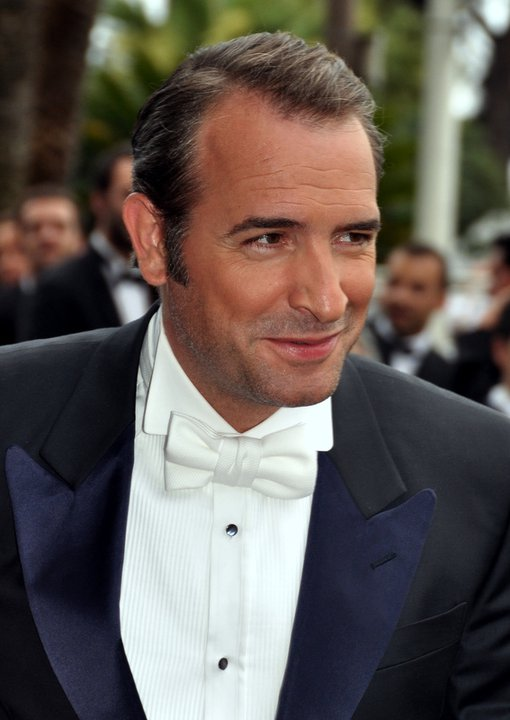
Jean Dujardin, Best Actor in a Motion Picture – Musical or Comedy winner

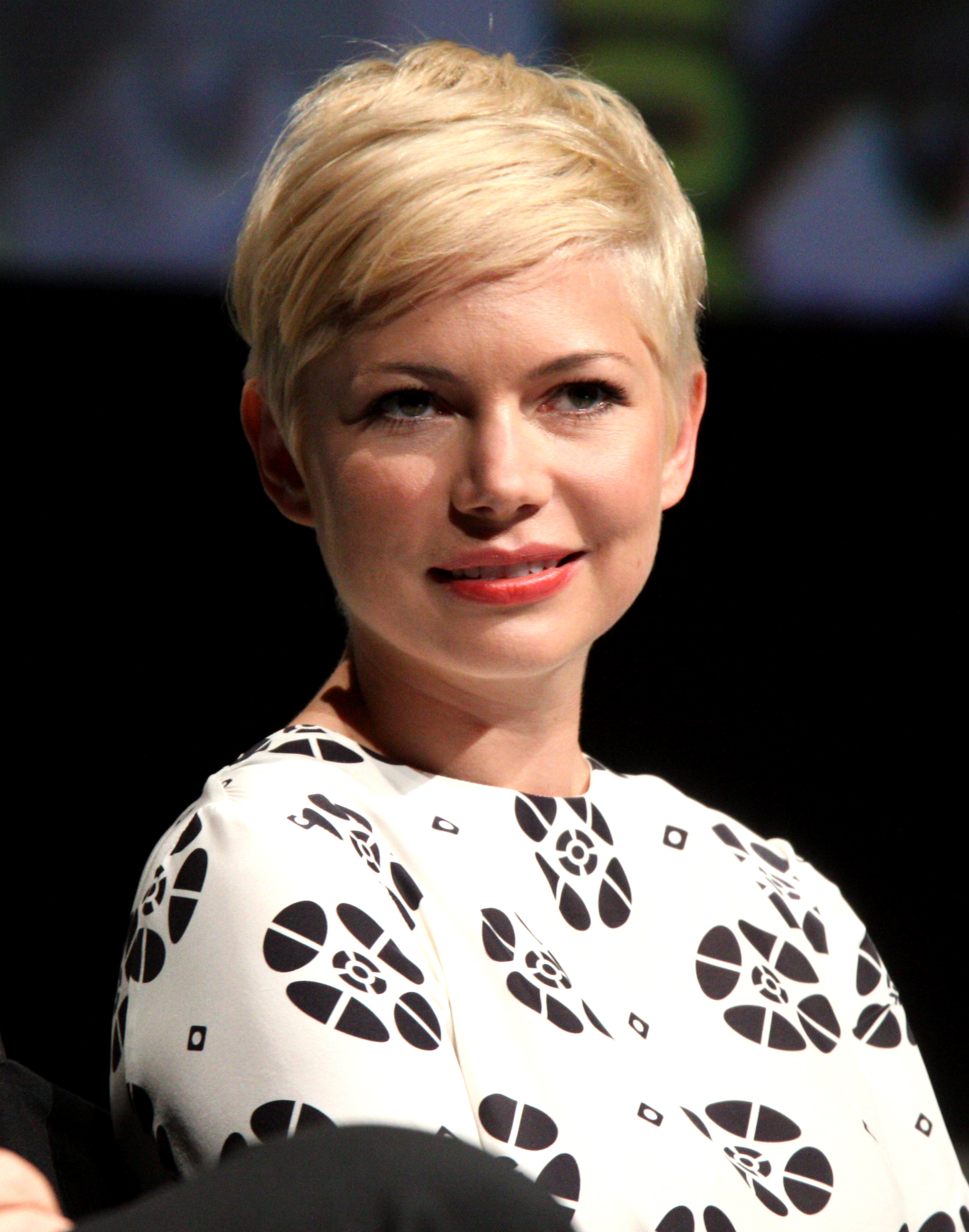
Michelle Williams, Best Actress in a Motion Picture – Musical or Comedy winner

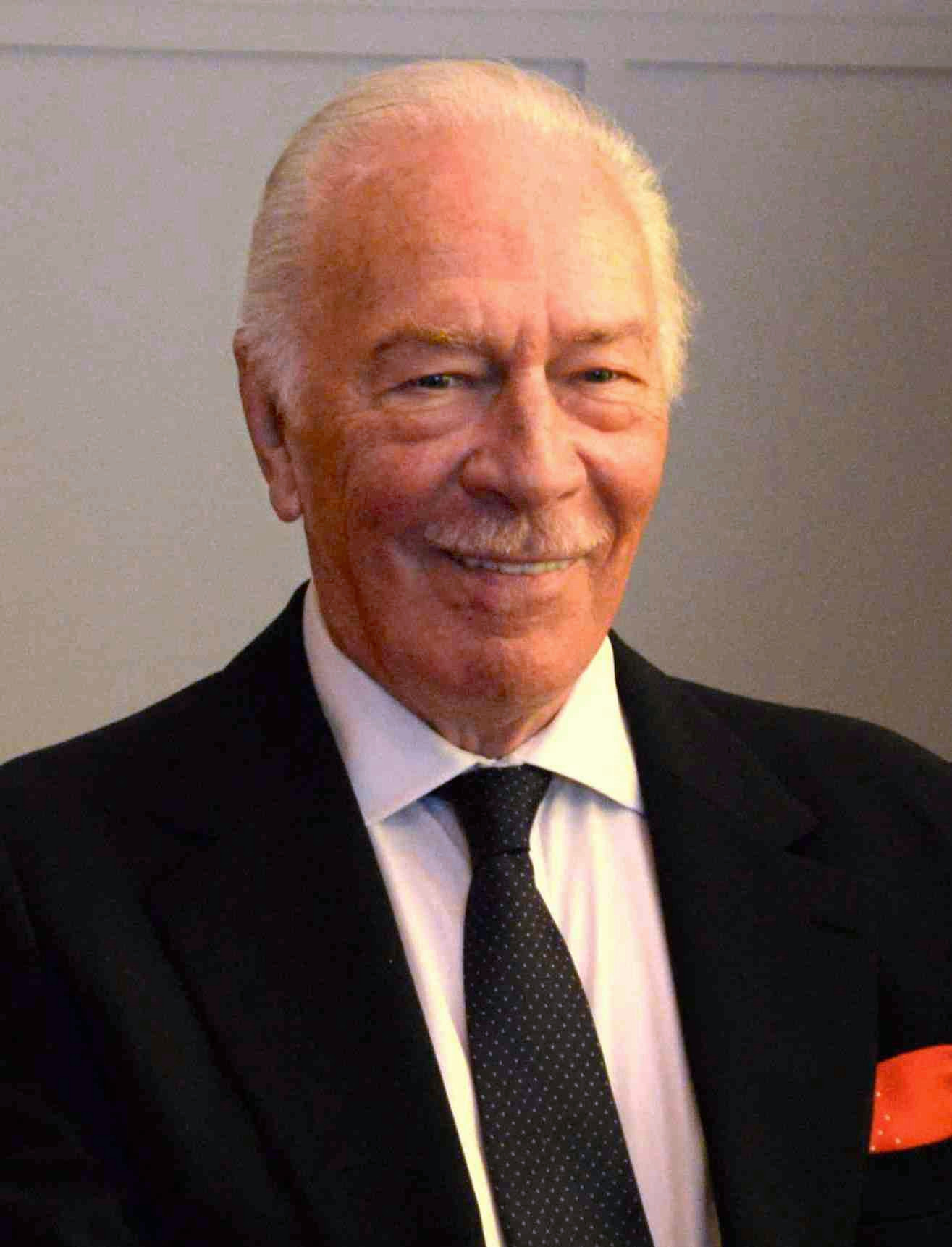
Christopher Plummer, Best Supporting Actor winner

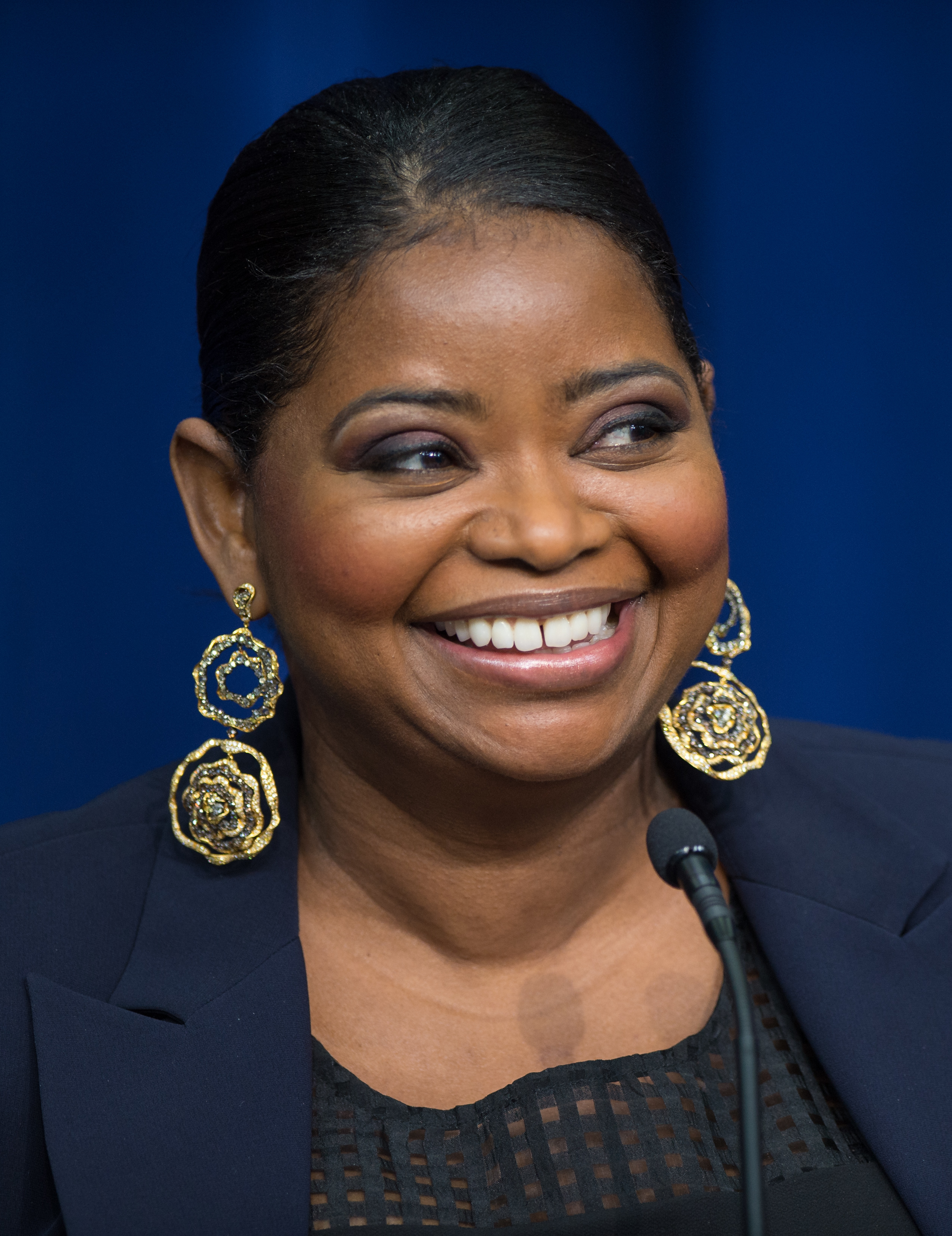
Octavia Spencer, Best Supporting Actress winner

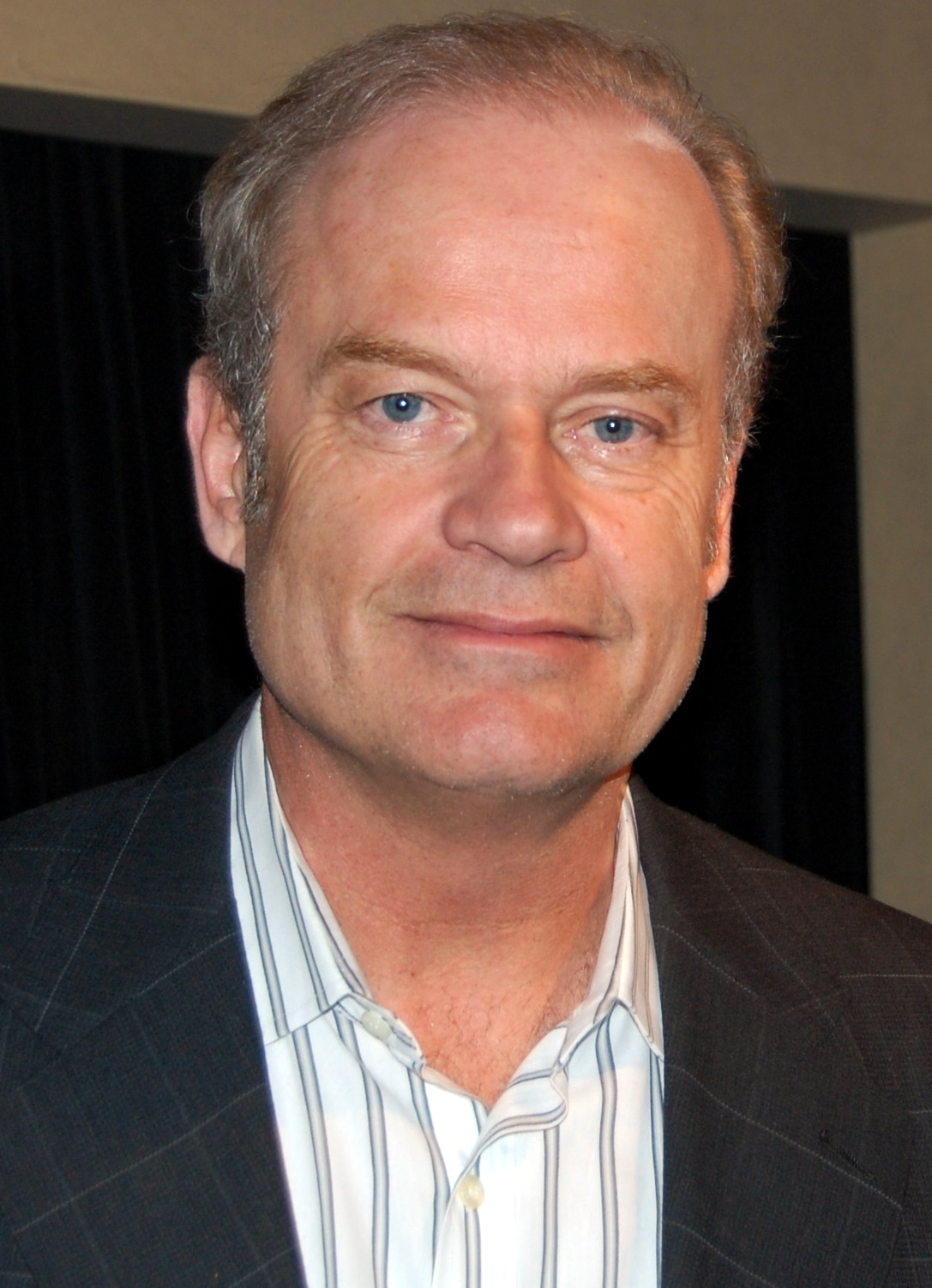
Kelsey Grammer, Best Actor in a Television Series – Drama winner

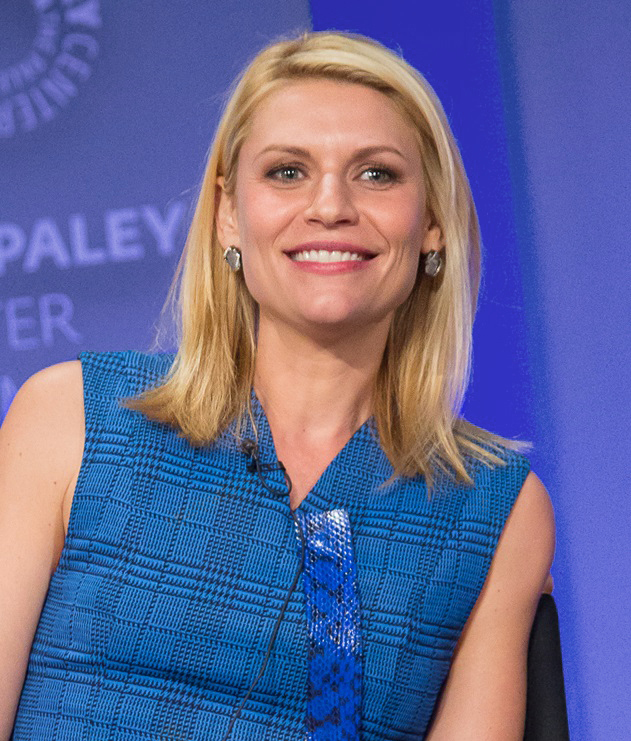
Claire Danes, Best Actress in a Television Series – Drama winner

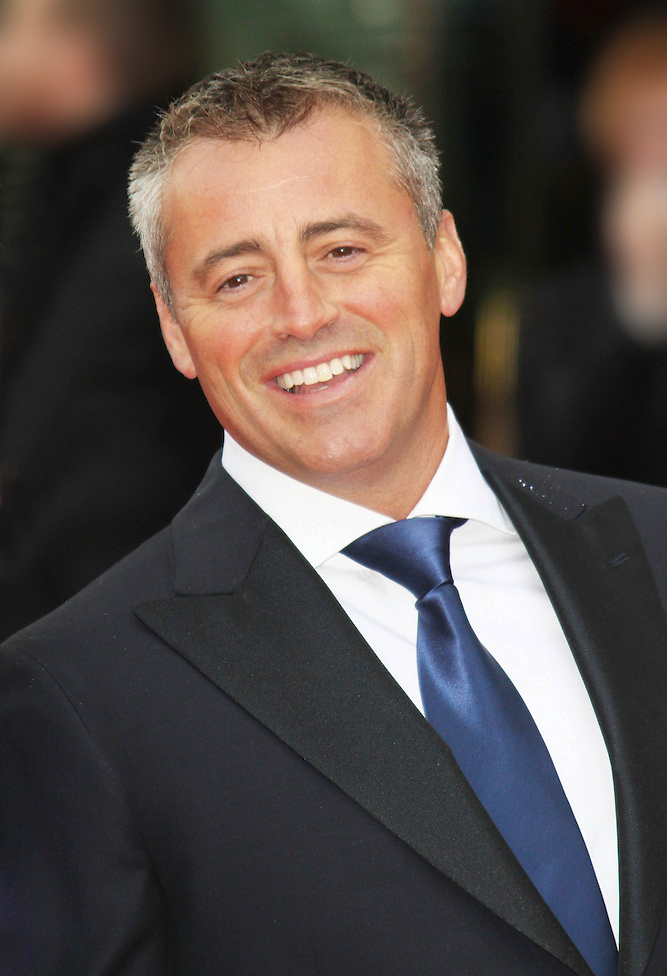
Matt LeBlanc, Best Actor in a Television Series – Musical or Comedy winner

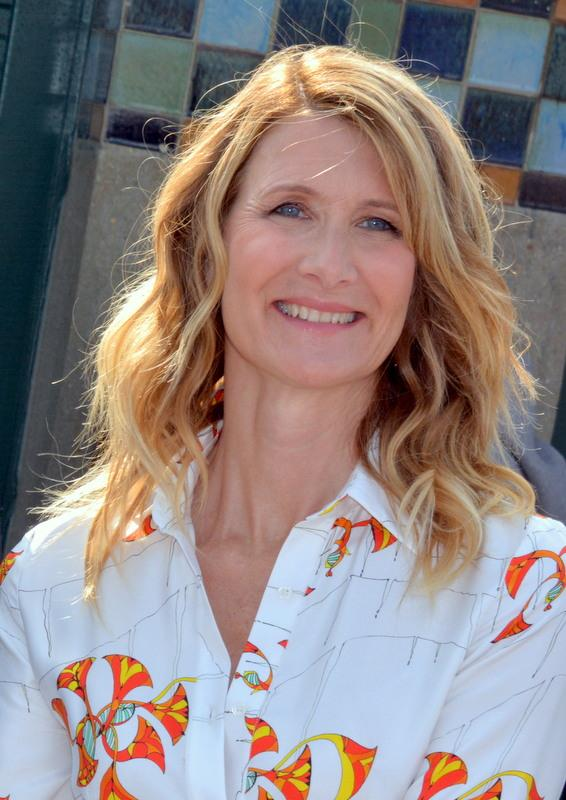
Laura Dern, Best Actress in a Television Series – Musical or Comedy winner

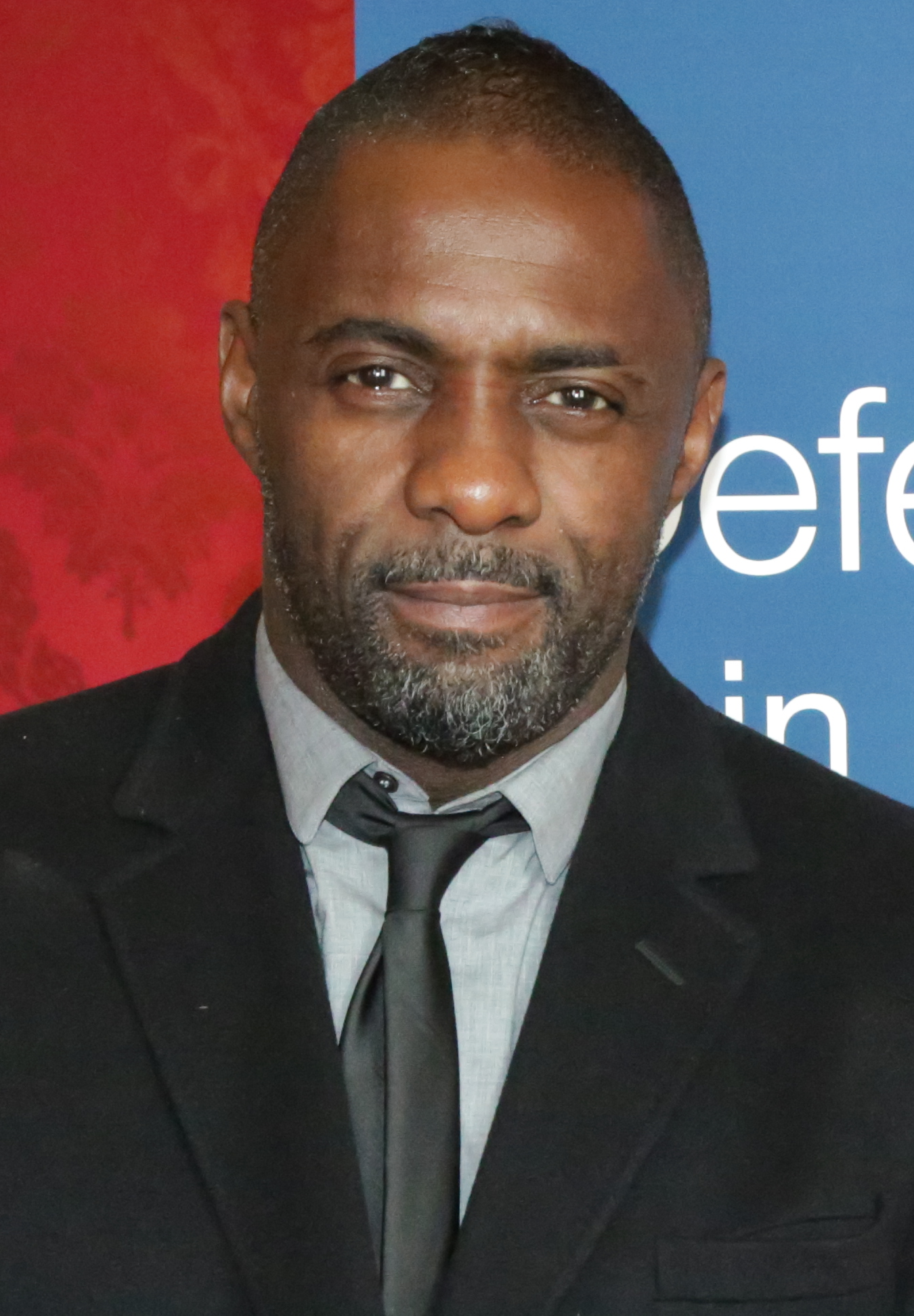
Idris Elba, Best Actor in a Miniseries or Television Film winner

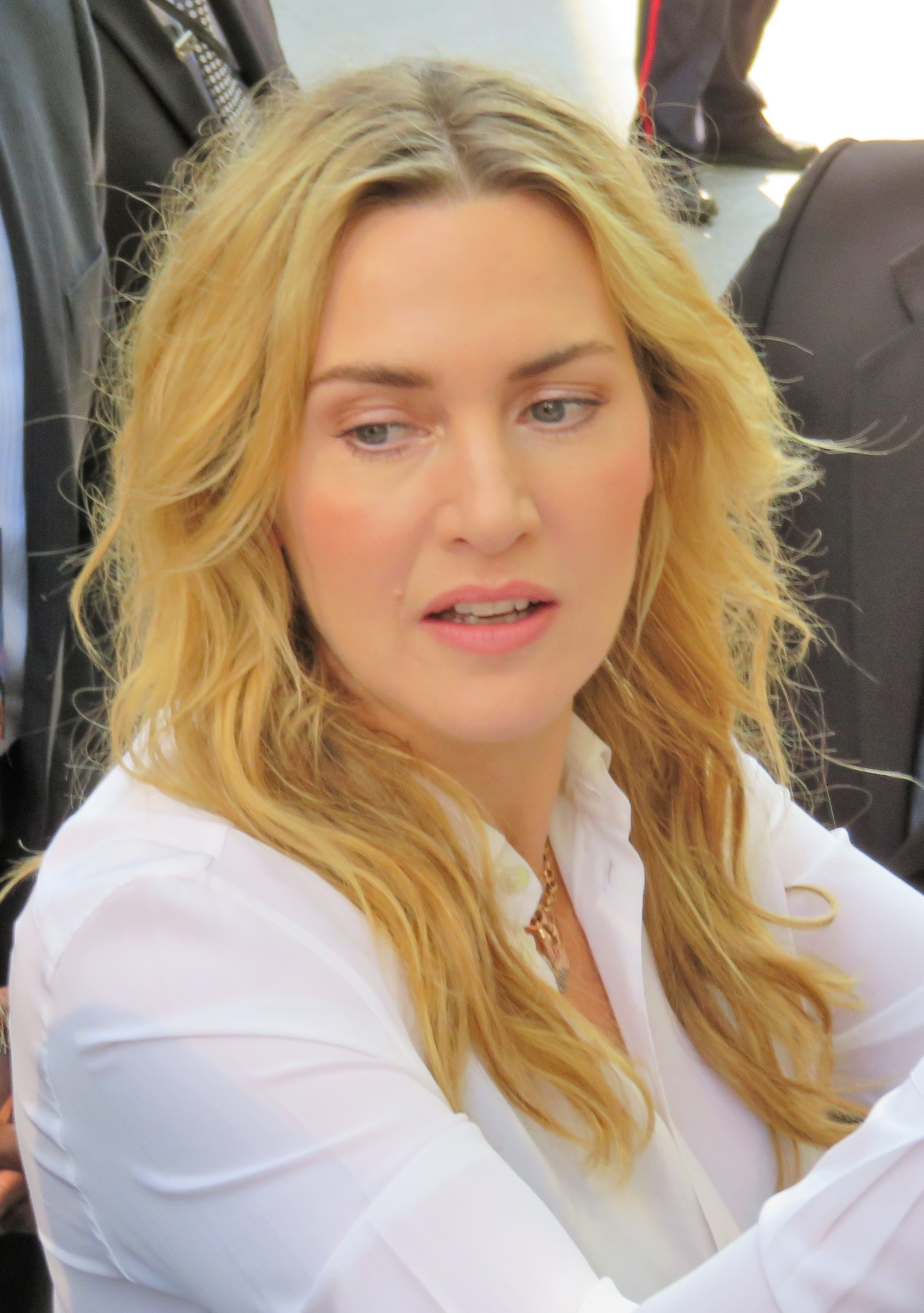
Kate Winslet, Best Actress in a Miniseries or Television Film winner

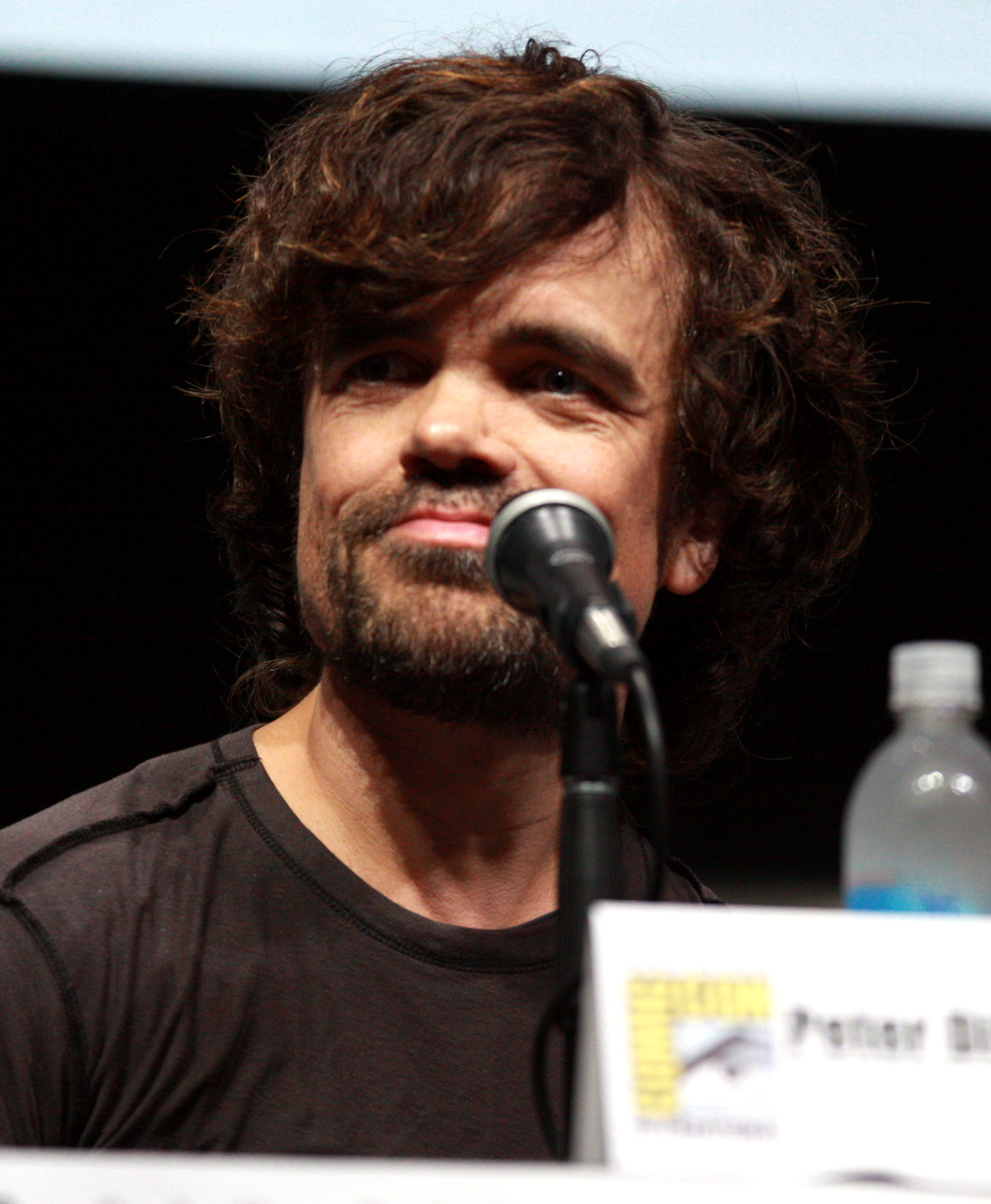
Peter Dinklage, Best Supporting Actor in a Series, Miniseries, or Television Film winner

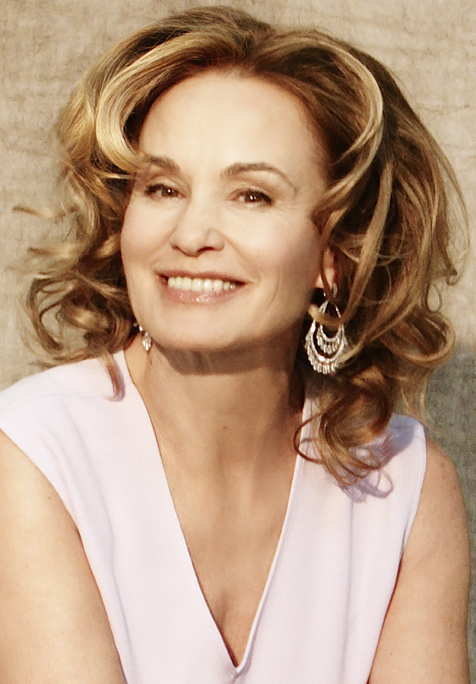
Jessica Lange, Best Supporting Actress in a Series, Miniseries, or Television Film winner

These are the nominees for the 69th Golden Globe Awards. Winners are listed at the top of each list.

=== Film ===
Best Motion Picture
Drama	Musical or Comedy
The Descendants; The Help; Hugo; The Ides of March; Moneyball; War Horse	The Artist; 50/50; Bridesmaids; Midnight in Paris; My Week with Marilyn
Best Performance in a Motion Picture – Drama
Actor	Actress
George Clooney – The Descendants as Matt King; Leonardo DiCaprio – J. Edgar as J. Edgar Hoover; Michael Fassbender – Shame as Brandon Sullivan; Ryan Gosling – The Ides of March as Stephen Meyers; Brad Pitt – Moneyball as Billy Beane	Meryl Streep – The Iron Lady as Margaret Thatcher; Glenn Close – Albert Nobbs as Albert Nobbs; Viola Davis – The Help as Aibileen Clark; Rooney Mara – The Girl with the Dragon Tattoo as Lisbeth Salander; Tilda Swinton – We Need to Talk About Kevin as Eva Khatchadourian
Best Performance in a Motion Picture – Musical or Comedy
Actor	Actress
Jean Dujardin – The Artist as George Valentin; Brendan Gleeson – The Guard as Gerry Boyle; Joseph Gordon-Levitt – 50/50 as Adam Lerner; Ryan Gosling – Crazy, Stupid, Love as Jacob Palmer; Owen Wilson – Midnight in Paris as Gil Pender	Michelle Williams – My Week with Marilyn as Marilyn Monroe; Jodie Foster – Carnage as Penelope Longstreet; Charlize Theron – Young Adult as Mavis Gary; Kristen Wiig – Bridesmaids as Annie Walker; Kate Winslet – Carnage as Nancy Cowan
Supporting Actor	Supporting Actress
Christopher Plummer – Beginners as Hal Fields; Kenneth Branagh – My Week with Marilyn as Laurence Olivier; Albert Brooks – Drive as Bernie Rose; Jonah Hill – Moneyball as Peter Brand; Viggo Mortensen – A Dangerous Method as Sigmund Freud	Octavia Spencer – The Help as Minny Jackson; Bérénice Bejo – The Artist as Peppy Miller; Jessica Chastain – The Help as Celia Foote; Janet McTeer – Albert Nobbs as Hubert Page; Shailene Woodley – The Descendants as Alexandra King
Best Director	Best Screenplay
Martin Scorsese – Hugo; Woody Allen – Midnight in Paris; George Clooney – The Ides of March; Michel Hazanavicius – The Artist; Alexander Payne – The Descendants	Woody Allen – Midnight in Paris; George Clooney, Grant Heslov and Beau Willimon – The Ides of March; Michel Hazanavicius – The Artist; Alexander Payne, Nat Faxon and Jim Rash – The Descendants; Steven Zaillian and Aaron Sorkin – Moneyball
Best Original Score	Best Original Song
Ludovic Bource – The Artist; Abel Korzeniowski – W.E.; Trent Reznor and Atticus Ross – The Girl with the Dragon Tattoo; Howard Shore – Hugo; John Williams – War Horse	"Masterpiece" (music and lyrics by Madonna, Julie Frost and Jimmy Harry) – W.E.; "Hello Hello" (music by Elton John and Lady Gaga; lyrics by Bernie Taupin) – Gnomeo & Juliet; "The Keeper" (music & lyrics by Chris Cornell) – Machine Gun Preacher; "Lay Your Head Down" (music by Brian Byrne; lyrics by Glenn Close) – Albert Nobbs; "The Living Proof" (music by Thomas Newman, Mary J. Blige and Harvey Mason Jr.; lyrics by Mary J. Blige, Harvey Mason Jr. and Damon Thomas) – The Help
Best Animated Feature Film	Best Foreign Language Film
The Adventures of Tintin: The Secret of the Unicorn; Arthur Christmas; Cars 2; Puss in Boots; Rango	A Separation • Iran; The Flowers of War • China; In the Land of Blood and Honey • United States (in Bosnian/Serbian); The Kid with a Bike • Belgium/France; The Skin I Live In • Spain

=== Television ===
Best Series
Drama	Musical or Comedy
Homeland (Showtime); American Horror Story (FX); Boardwalk Empire (HBO); Boss (Starz); Game of Thrones (HBO)	Modern Family (ABC); Enlightened (HBO); Episodes (Showtime); Glee (Fox); New Girl (Fox)
Best Performance in a Television Series – Drama
Actor	Actress
Kelsey Grammer – Boss (Starz) as Tom Kane; Steve Buscemi – Boardwalk Empire (HBO) as Nucky Thompson; Bryan Cranston – Breaking Bad (AMC) as Walter White; Jeremy Irons – The Borgias (Showtime) as Pope Alexander VI; Damian Lewis – Homeland (Showtime) as Nicholas Brody	Claire Danes – Homeland (Showtime) as Carrie Mathison; Mireille Enos – The Killing (AMC) as Sarah Linden; Julianna Margulies – The Good Wife (CBS) as Alicia Florrick; Madeleine Stowe – Revenge (ABC) as Victoria Grayson; Callie Thorne – Necessary Roughness (USA Network) as Dr. Danielle "Dani" Santino
Best Performance in a Television Series – Musical or Comedy
Actor	Actress
Matt LeBlanc – Episodes (Showtime) as himself; Alec Baldwin – 30 Rock (NBC) as Jack Donaghy; David Duchovny – Californication (Showtime) as Hank Moody; Johnny Galecki – The Big Bang Theory (CBS) as Dr. Leonard Hofstadter; Thomas Jane – Hung (HBO) as Ray Drecker	Laura Dern – Enlightened (HBO) as Amy Jellicoe; Zooey Deschanel – New Girl (Fox) as Jessica "Jess" Day; Tina Fey – 30 Rock (NBC) as Liz Lemon; Laura Linney – The Big C (Showtime) as Catherine "Cathy" Jamison; Amy Poehler – Parks and Recreation (NBC) as Leslie Knope
Best Performance in a Miniseries or Television Film
Actor	Actress
Idris Elba – Luther (BBC America) as Detective Chief Inspector John Luther; Hugh Bonneville – Downton Abbey (PBS) as Robert, Earl of Grantham; William Hurt – Too Big to Fail (HBO) as Henry Paulson; Bill Nighy – Page Eight (PBS) as Johnny Worricker; Dominic West – The Hour (BBC America) as Hector Madden	Kate Winslet – Mildred Pierce (HBO) as Mildred Pierce; Romola Garai – The Hour (BBC America) as Bel Rowley; Diane Lane – Cinema Verite (HBO) as Pat Loud; Elizabeth McGovern – Downton Abbey (PBS) as Cora, Countess of Grantham; Emily Watson – Appropriate Adult (Sundance TV) as Janet Leach
Best Supporting Performance in a Series, Miniseries, or Television Film
Actor	Actress
Peter Dinklage – Game of Thrones (HBO) as Tyrion Lannister; Paul Giamatti – Too Big to Fail (HBO) as Ben Bernanke; Guy Pearce – Mildred Pierce (HBO) as Monty Beragon; Tim Robbins – Cinema Verite (HBO) as Bill Loud; Eric Stonestreet – Modern Family (ABC) as Cameron Tucker	Jessica Lange – American Horror Story (FX) as Constance Langdon; Kelly Macdonald – Boardwalk Empire (HBO) as Margaret Schroeder; Maggie Smith – Downton Abbey (PBS) as Violet, Dowager Countess of Grantham; Sofía Vergara – Modern Family (ABC) as Gloria Delgado-Pritchett; Evan Rachel Wood – Mildred Pierce (HBO) as Veda Pierce
Best Miniseries or Television Film
Downton Abbey (PBS); Cinema Verite (HBO); The Hour (BBC America); Mildred Pierce (HBO); Too Big to Fail (HBO)

== Multiple nominations ==
=== Films ===
The following 15 films received multiple nominations:

Nominations	Films
6	The Artist
5	The Descendants
5	The Help
4	The Ides of March
4	Midnight in Paris
4	Moneyball
3	Albert Nobbs
3	Hugo
3	My Week with Marilyn
2	50/50
2	Bridesmaids
2	Carnage
2	The Girl with the Dragon Tattoo
2	War Horse
2	W.E.

=== Television ===
The following 15 series received multiple nominations:

Nominations	Series
4	Downton Abbey
4	Mildred Pierce
3	Boardwalk Empire
3	Cinema Verite
3	Homeland
3	The Hour
3	Modern Family
3	Too Big to Fail
2	30 Rock
2	American Horror Story
2	Boss
2	Enlightened
2	Episodes
2	Game of Thrones
2	New Girl

== Multiple wins ==
=== Film ===
The following 2 films received multiple wins:

Wins	Film
3	The Artist
2	The Descendants

=== Television ===
The following series received multiple wins:

Wins	Series
2	Homeland

== Ceremony ==
=== Presenters ===
- Jessica Alba
- Antonio Banderas
- Kate Beckinsale
- Jessica Biel
- Emily Blunt
- Gerard Butler
- George Clooney
- Bradley Cooper
- Meltem Cumbul
- Johnny Depp
- Robert Downey, Jr.
- Jimmy Fallon
- Colin Firth
- Jane Fonda
- Harrison Ford
- Sarah Michelle Gellar
- Jake Gyllenhaal
- Salma Hayek
- Dustin Hoffman
- Felicity Huffman
- Jeremy Irons
- Angelina Jolie
- Nicole Kidman
- Mila Kunis
- Ashton Kutcher
- Queen Latifah
- Adam Levine
- Rob Lowe
- Jane Lynch
- Elle Macpherson
- William H. Macy
- Madonna
- Melissa McCarthy
- Ewan McGregor
- Katharine McPhee
- Debra Messing
- Helen Mirren
- Julianne Moore
- Clive Owen
- Paula Patton
- Piper Perabo
- Michelle Pfeiffer
- Freida Pinto
- Brad Pitt
- Sidney Poitier
- Natalie Portman
- Seth Rogen
- Channing Tatum
- Mark Wahlberg
- Reese Witherspoon

Presenter	Accolade
Jessica Alba Channing Tatum	Co-Present Best Animated Feature Film
Antonio Banderas Salma Hayek	Co-Present Best Television Series — Comedy or Musical
Kate Beckinsale Seth Rogen	Co-Present Best Performance by an Actress in a Motion Picture — Musical or Comedy
Jessica Biel Mark Wahlberg	Co-Present Best Performance by an Actor in a Motion Picture — Musical or Comedy
Emily Blunt	Introduces the clip Bridesmaids
Pierce Brosnan	
Gerard Butler Mila Kunis	Co-Present Best Performance by a Supporting Actor in a Motion Picture
George Clooney	Introduces the clip Moneyball
Bradley Cooper	Presents Best Performance by a Supporting Actress in a Motion Picture
Meltem Cumbul	Announces the Golden Globe rating
Johnny Depp	Introduces the clip Hugo
Robert Downey, Jr.	Introduces the clip The Artist
Jimmy Fallon Adam Levine	Co-Present Best Original Song and Best Original Score
Tina Fey Jane Lynch	Co-Present Best Performance by an Actor in a Television Series — Comedy or Musical
Colin Firth	Presents Best Performance by an Actress in a Motion Picture — Drama
Jane Fonda	Presents Best Performance by an Actor in a Television Series — Comedy or Musical
Harrison Ford	Presents Best Motion Picture — Drama
Sarah Michelle Gellar Piper Perabo	Co-Present Best Performance by a Supporting Actor — Series, Miniseries or Motion Picture Made for Television
Jake Gyllenhaal	Introduces the clip My Week with Marylin
Dustin Hoffman	Presents Best Performance by an Actress in a Television Series — Drama
Felicity Huffman William H. Macy	Co-Present Best Performance by a Supporting Actress — Series, Miniseries or Motion Picture made for Television
Angelina Jolie	Presents Best Director
Nicole Kidman Clive Owen	Co-Present Best Screenplay
Ashton Kutcher Elle Macpherson	Co-Present Best Performance by an Actress in a Television Series — Comedy or Musical
Queen Latifah	Introduces the clip The Help
Rob Lowe Julianne Moore	Co-Present Best Performance by an Actress in a Miniseries or Television Film and Best Miniseries or Television Film
Madonna	Presents Best Foreign Language Film
Melissa McCarthy Paula Patton	Co-Present Best Performance by an Actor in a Television Series — Drama and Best Television Series — Drama
Ewan McGregor	Introduces the clip 50/50
Katharine McPhee Debra Messing	Co-Present Best Performance by an Actor — Miniseries or Television Film
Michelle Pfeiffer	Introduces the clip War Horse
Freida Pinto	Introduces the clip Midnight in Paris
Brad Pitt	Introduces the clip The Ides of March
Sidney Potier Helen Mirren	Co-Present Cecil B. DeMille Award to recipient Morgan Freeman
Natalie Portman	Presents Best Performance by an Actor in a Motion Picture — Drama
Reese Witherspoon	Introduces the clip The Descendants

=== Cecil B. DeMille Award ===
Morgan Freeman

=== Miss Golden Globe ===
Rainey Qualley (daughter of Andie MacDowell & Paul Qualley)

== See also ==
- Hollywood Foreign Press Association
- 84th Academy Awards
- 64th Primetime Emmy Awards
- 63rd Primetime Emmy Awards
- 18th Screen Actors Guild Awards
- 65th British Academy Film Awards
- 1st AACTA International Awards
- 32nd Golden Raspberry Awards
- 66th Tony Awards
- 2011 in film
- 2011 in American television
