= The Descendants (soundtrack) =

The Descendants (Music from the Motion Picture)

Soundtrack album by various artists
- Released: November 15, 2011
- Genre: Hawaiian; reggae; rock and roll; jazz
- Length: 49:38
- Label: Sony Classical
- Producer: Alexander Payne; Amy Driscoll; Dondi Bastone

The Descendants (Music from the Motion Picture) is the soundtrack to the film The Descendants, released, three days before the film on November 15, 2011 by Sony Classical Records. The film uses Hawaiian music, featuring artists including Gabby Pahinui, Ray Kane, Keola Beamer, Lena Machado, Sonny Chillingworth, Jeff Peterson, Makana, Dennis Kamakahi, and Danny Carvalho. The soundtrack was acclaimed by music critics for its use of Hawaiian music and received a nomination for Grammy Award for Best Compilation Soundtrack for Visual Media at the 55th Annual Grammy Awards.

== Background ==
In an email interview to Los Angeles Times, Alexander Payne said that "For such a small area (Hawaii), there's an intimidating amount to learn about their tremendous musical heritage". Music supervisor Dondi Bastone, had listened to "mountains of music" to select the songs that fit the film. Bastone and Payne, were tutored by Jay Junker, a professor in the University of Hawaii's ethnomusicology program, who were given insights into translating references, metaphors and double-entendres of those songs and opined on how much the meanings of those songs were tied to specific locations in the islands. Payne said: "[He] tried to dissuade us from using, say, a Big Island song over a scene on Oahu [...] He said that 'old-timers' would know the difference and object. Although in the end we opted for feeling, rhythm and emotion over locative considerations, Junker's perspective suggested the truly deep roots that autochthonous music holds for Hawaiian people."

Since the 1970s, slack-key has been a very potent emblem of Hawaii," Junker said. "I think it just rose out of the grass-roots culture and really became part of the commercial world without seeming to be tainted by commercialism. It was really seen by people to be the people's music.

— Jay Junker

A traditional slack-key guitar, which was prominent in the 1920s had an important roles. Hence the 1930 arrangement of the traditional "Ka Mele Oku'u Pu'wai" (originally played by guitarist Sol Hoopii and his Novelty Trio) was selected to be used in the soundtrack, while the modern day re-arrangements had been done by modern slack-key guitarist Gabby Pahinui. By January 2011, guitarists Jeff Peterson and Keola Beamer recorded additional slack-key and contemporary guitar portions at the Avex Studios in Hawaii, with music editor Richard Ford, Payne and Bastone supervising the recordings, with Payne asking him to record additional music on the shooting spot. Peterson said that "They let me watch two scenes and just react and compose. It worked really well. I was really inspired. I love that challenge."

Peterson felt that Hawaiian music will benefit from the exposure of its use in the film, saying "I think it will get the music out to a whole new audience. This music has a lot of depth to it and they spent a year researching Hawaiian music before they decided what they wanted to use."

== Reception ==
James Christopher Monger of AllMusic wrote: "Highly listenable and extremely likable, it's a soundtrack that feels loved, much like the Italian folk/Louis Prima-heavy soundtrack to Stanley Tucci and Campbell Scott's 1996 period comedy-drama Big Night, and as an introduction to traditional Hawaiian music, it's almost indispensable." Joe Morgenstern of The Wall Street Journal wrote "There's a further sense of discovery in the soundtrack; "The Descendants" was scored with Hawaiian music by Hawaiian artists—songs of extraordinary sweetness, joy and soulfulness that bear little or no resemblance to the stuff that's commonly strummed on ukuleles." Peter Travers of Rolling Stone wrote that the soundtrack "deftly blends traditional and modern Hawaiian music". Andrew O'Hehir of Salon.com mentioned that the soundtrack is "likely to spark a mini-craze for Hawaiian slack-key guitar pop".

== Track listing ==
| No. | Title | Artist(s) | Length |
|---|---|---|---|
| 1. | "Ka Makani Ka 'Ili Aloha" | Gabby Pahinui | 2:53 |
| 2. | "Kalena Kai" | Keola Beamer and George Winston | 4:25 |
| 3. | "Hi 'Ilawe" | Gabby Pahinui | 4:09 |
| 4. | "'Ulilie" | Dennis Kamakahi | 4:19 |
| 5. | "Pine Tree Slack Key" | Pancho Graham | 3:18 |
| 6. | "Auwe" | Raymond Kāne | 2:17 |
| 7. | "Leahi" | Gabby Pahinui | 3:53 |
| 8. | "Hawaiian Skies" | Jeff Peterson | 2:21 |
| 9. | "He'eia" | Gabby Pahinui and Sons of Hawaii | 2:45 |
| 10. | "'Ima Au Ia 'Oe" | Keola Beamer | 3:12 |
| 11. | "Kaua 'I Beauty" | Gabby Pahinui | 3:26 |
| 12. | "Hi'ilawe" | Sonny Chillingworth | 6:13 |
| 13. | "Wai O Ke Aniani" | Gabby Pahinui | 2:54 |
| 14. | "Pua Hone" | Dennis Kamakahi | 3:51 |
| 15. | "Hapuna Sunset" | Charles Michael Brotman | 3:51 |
| 16. | "Deep In An Ancient Hawaiian Forest" | Makana | 5:14 |
| 17. | "Mom" | Lena Machado | 2:54 |
| 18. | "Ka Mele Oku'u Pu 'Uwai" | Sol Hoopii's Novelty Trio | 3:17 |
| Total length: | | | 65:12 |

== Accolades ==
| Award | Date of ceremony | Category | Result | Ref(s) |
|---|---|---|---|---|
| Boston Society of Film Critics | December 11, 2011 | Best Use of Music in a Film | Nominated | |
| Grammy Awards | February 10, 2013 | Best Compilation Soundtrack For Visual Media | Nominated | |
