= Kaui Hart Hemmings =

American writer

- Born: 1975 (age 49–50); Hawaii, United States
- Occupation: author
- Language: English
- Education: Punahou School; Colorado College; Sarah Lawrence College (MFA)
- Relatives: Fred Hemmings (father)

Kaui Hart Hemmings (born 1975) is an American writer. She is best known for her 2007 novel The Descendants, which was adapted into a film of the same title.

== Biography ==
Kaui Hart Hemmings was born and raised in Hawaii. She attended Punahou School for high school, graduating in 1994. She attended Colorado College and graduated in 1998. She earned her M.F.A. at Sarah Lawrence College in 2002. She was one of Stanford's 2002 Stegner Fellows.

Her debut novel, The Descendants, was published in 22 countries and was a New York Times bestseller. It was adapted into the 2011 film The Descendants, starring George Clooney and written by Alexander Payne, Nat Faxon, and Jim Rash.

Hemmings previously published a collection of stories, House of Thieves. She has written two other novels for adults, The Possibilities (2014) and How to Party With an Infant (2016), and one for young readers, Juniors (2015). In 2019, she published her novel Testimony from Your Perfect Girl.

== Bibliography ==
Short story collections

- House of Thieves (2005) ISBN 9781594200489

Novels

- The Descendants (2007) ISBN 1-4000-6633-6
- The Possibilities (2014) ISBN 9781476725796
- Juniors (for young adults) (2015) ISBN 9780399173608
- How to Party With an Infant (2016) ISBN 9781501100796
- Testimony from Your Perfect Girl (2019) ISBN 9780698188426

== Reviews ==
- Kavenna, Joanna (May 20, 2007). "The Descendants – Kaui Hart Hemmings – Books – Review". The New York Times.
