= A Merry Friggin' Christmas =

2014 American comedy film

- Theatrical release poster
- Directed by: Tristram Shapeero
- Written by: Phil Johnston
- Produced by: Anthony Russo; Joe Russo; Tom Rice; Michael Flynn
- Starring: Joel McHale; Lauren Graham; Clark Duke; Oliver Platt; Wendi McLendon-Covey; Tim Heidecker; Candice Bergen; Robin Williams
- Cinematography: Giovani Lampassi
- Edited by: Christian Kinnard
- Music by: Ludwig Göransson
- Production company: Sycamore Pictures
- Distributed by: Phase 4 Films; Entertainment One Films
- Release date: November 7, 2014
- Running time: 82 minutes
- Country: United States
- Language: English

A Merry Friggin' Christmas (Also known as A Merry Christmas Miracle) is a 2014 American black comedy film directed by Tristram Shapeero and written by Phil Johnston. The film stars an ensemble cast featuring Joel McHale, Lauren Graham, Clark Duke, Oliver Platt, Wendi McLendon-Covey, Tim Heidecker, Candice Bergen and Robin Williams. The film was released by Phase 4 Films and Entertainment One Films on November 7, 2014. The film received generally negative reviews from critics.

== Plot ==
Boyd Mitchler must spend Christmas with his estranged family. When he realizes that he left all of his son's gifts at home, he hits the road with his dad in an attempt to make the eight-hour round-trip before sunrise.

== Cast ==
- Joel McHale as Boyd Mitchler
- Robin Williams as Virgil Mitchler, Boyd's father
- Lauren Graham as Luann Mitchler, Boyd's wife
- Candice Bergen as Donna Mitchler, Boyd's mother
- Clark Duke as Nelson Mitchler, Boyd's younger brother
- Wendi McLendon-Covey as Shauna Mitchler-Weinke, Boyd's older sister
- Tim Heidecker as Dave Weinke, Shauna's husband
- Pierce Gagnon as Douglas Mitchler, Boyd and Luann's son
- Bebe Wood as Vera Mitchler, Boyd and Luann's daughter
- Amara Miller as Pam Weinke, Shauna and Dave's daughter
- Ryan Lee as Rance Weinke, Shauna and Dave's son
- Oliver Platt as Hobo Santa
- Amir Arison as Farhad
- Mark Proksch as Trooper Zblocki
- Gene Jones as Glen
- Jeffrey Tambor as Snow Globe Snowman (voice)

== Production ==
Principal photography began in April 2013 in Atlanta, Georgia. Williams died on August 11, 2014, before the film was released, and it was dedicated to his memory.

== Release ==
The film was released by Phase 4 Films on November 7, 2014. It is the first film starring Robin Williams to be released after his death on August 11, 2014.

== Reception ==
On Rotten Tomatoes, the film has a rating of 14%, based on 21 reviews, with an average rating of 3.45/10. On Metacritic, the film has a score of 28 out of 100, based on reviews from 11 critics, indicating "generally unfavorable" reviews.

Jesse Hassenger of The A.V. Club wrote, "Williams made some terrible movies, but he never phoned them in. On both counts, this one's no exception."

Frank Scheck of The Hollywood Reporter wrote, "Representing one of Robin Williams's last films, A Merry Friggin' Christmas lives up to its bah, humbug title. Not only because it's terrible, although it is, but rather because one desperately hoped that the beloved actor would go out on a high note."

Geoff Berkshire of Variety wrote, "Neither warm and fuzzy in the best holiday movie traditions, nor edgy and irreverent a la 'Bad Santa' (coincidentally also co-starring Graham, to better effect), it's something of a mystery what audience A Merry Friggin' Christmas intends to serve."

== See also ==
- List of Christmas films
