= The Descendants =

2011 drama film directed by Alexander Payne

- Theatrical release poster
- Directed by: Alexander Payne
- Screenplay by: Alexander Payne; Nat Faxon; Jim Rash
- Based on: The Descendants by Kaui Hart Hemmings
- Produced by: Jim Burke; Alexander Payne; Jim Taylor
- Starring: George Clooney; Shailene Woodley; Beau Bridges; Judy Greer
- Cinematography: Phedon Papamichael
- Edited by: Kevin Tent
- Production company: Ad Hominem Enterprises
- Distributed by: Fox Searchlight Pictures
- Release dates: September 10, 2011 (TIFF); November 18, 2011 (United States)
- Running time: 115 minutes
- Country: United States
- Language: English
- Budget: $20 million
- Box office: $177.2 million

The Descendants is a 2011 American tragicomedy film directed by Alexander Payne from a screenplay he wrote with Nat Faxon and Jim Rash, based on the 2007 novel by Kaui Hart Hemmings. The film stars George Clooney in the main role, Shailene Woodley, Amara Miller in her film debut, Beau Bridges, Judy Greer, Nick Krause, Michael Ontkean, Matthew Lillard, and Robert Forster, and was released by Fox Searchlight Pictures in the United States on November 18, 2011, after premiering at the 2011 Toronto International Film Festival on September 10, 2011.

Tracing the journey of attorney and land baron Matt King, who struggles with unexpected occurrences in his monotonous life, The Descendants was a critical and financial success, grossing $177 million against a $20 million budget and receiving acclaim for the performances of Clooney and Woodley, Payne's direction and writing, and Kevin Tent's editing. The film was nominated for five Oscars at the 84th Academy Awards, including Best Picture, Best Director for Payne, and Best Actor for Clooney, winning one for Best Adapted Screenplay. The film also won two Golden Globe Awards; Best Picture – Drama and Best Actor – Drama for Clooney.

== Plot ==
Honolulu-based attorney Matthew "Matt" King is the sole trustee of a trust of 25,000 acres (100 km^{2}) of pristine land on Kauai owned by his extended family. The land has great monetary value, but is also a family legacy. While Matt has ably managed his own finances, most of his cousins have squandered their inheritances. With the trust expiring in seven years due to the rule against perpetuities, the King clan is pressuring Matt to sell the land for hundreds of millions of dollars. Amidst these discussions, a boating accident renders Matt's wife, Elizabeth, comatose. With Elizabeth hospitalized, Matt is forced to cope with his two troubled daughters, 10-year-old Scottie, who seeks attention by bullying other children, and 17-year-old Alex, who has a history of substance abuse and goes to a private boarding school on the Big Island. Elizabeth's coma is determined irreversible and her living will directs all life support be discontinued. When Matt tells Alex, she reveals that Elizabeth was having an affair, which had caused a major rift between mother and daughter.

Close family friends Kai and Mark Mitchell tell Matt that Elizabeth was unhappy and loved Brian Speer, a local real estate agent, and had planned to ask Matt for a divorce. After Matt informs friends about Elizabeth's condition so they can say goodbye, he decides Brian should also be informed. He and the girls, along with Alex's slacker friend Sid, travel to Kauai to find Brian. While there, Matt's cousin, Hugh, mentions that Brian is brother-in-law to Don Holitzer, the developer to whom the majority of the family wants to sell the land. Brian stands to make a small fortune from sales commissions for the properties that will be developed on the land. Matt and his daughters find Brian vacationing with his family at an oceanside cabin, where Matt privately confronts Brian and tells him Elizabeth is dying, and offers him an opportunity to say goodbye. Matt asks Brian if Elizabeth loved him, and he says she did, but he only considered her a fling and still loves his wife. Brian apologizes for the pain he caused and asks Matt to say nothing to his wife.

Frustrated and fragile from recent events, Matt asks the doctor to explain Elizabeth's inevitable death to Scottie. Elizabeth's father, Scott, berates Matt and blames him for her accident, arguing that Elizabeth was a "faithful, devoted wife" and that Matt should have sold his land earlier so that she could afford to buy her own (safer) boat or indulge in safer hobbies such as shopping sprees. Matt declines to argue with Scott in order to withhold the truth of his wife's affair, but Sid and Alex stand up for Matt and defend his handling of the family's tragedy. At the King family meeting, Matt overrules his cousins' majority, preferring to keep the land and find a workaround the rule against perpetuities. Shocked, Hugh warns Matt that the family will take legal action, but Matt is undeterred.

After learning about Brian's affair, his wife, Julie, comes to the hospital. She tearfully tells a comatose Elizabeth that she wants to hate her for "trying to destroy" her family, but must forgive her to find peace. Matt comes to terms with Elizabeth's infidelity and impending death. He kisses her goodbye, followed by Alex and Scottie. They scatter Elizabeth's ashes in the ocean off Waikiki.

Later, Matt, Scottie and Alex are at home eating ice cream and watching the documentary March of the Penguins, snuggling under a quilt that was on Elizabeth's hospital bed.

== Cast ==
- George Clooney as Matthew "Matt" King
- Shailene Woodley as Alexandra "Alex" King
- Amara Miller as Scottie King
- Nick Krause as Sid
- Beau Bridges as Hugh King
- Judy Greer as Julie Speer
- Matthew Lillard as Brian Speer
- Robert Forster as Scott Thorson
- Patricia Hastie as Elizabeth King
- Mary Birdsong as Kai Mitchell
- Rob Huebel as Mark Mitchell
- Milt Kogan as Dr. Johnston
- Laird Hamilton as Troy
- Michael Ontkean as Cousin Milo
- Matt Corboy as Cousin Ralph

== Production ==
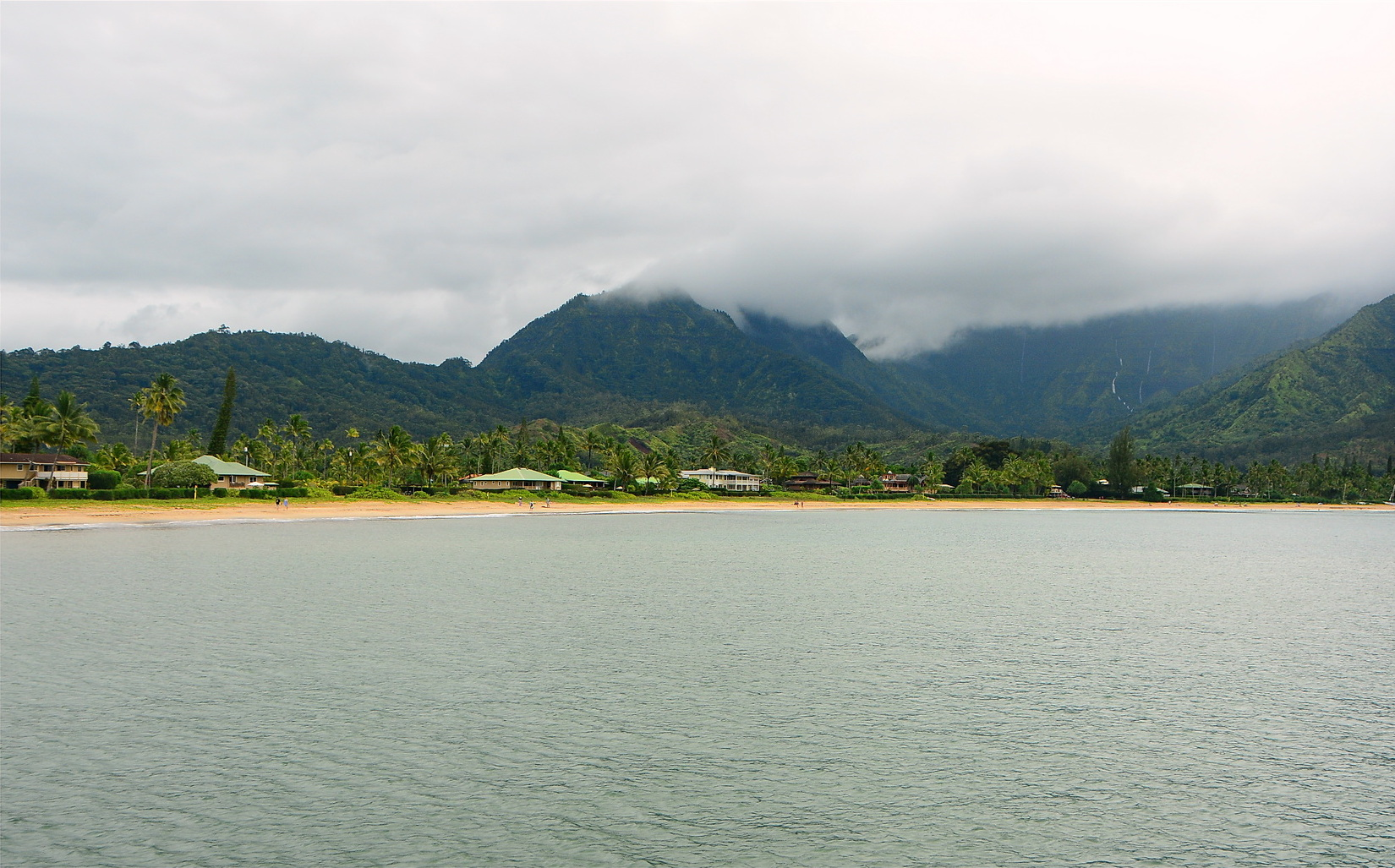
View of the beach used in the film

The film began its on-location shoot in Hawaii on March 15, 2010. Most of the film was shot in Honolulu and around Hanalei Bay. The location used as Matt King's house lacked the banyan tree described in the book; the filmmakers solved the issue by transplanting a banyan. For the scene where the King family drives up to a ridge to look over their land, the film used a 3,000-acre (1,200 ha) private cattle ranch on the south shore of Kauai, Kipu Ranch. Kaui Hart Hemmings, the author of the novel on which the movie was based, had a cameo as Matt King's secretary.

The private boarding school attended by Alex King was depicted as Mid-Pacific Institute, which is in Honolulu, Oʻahu. Kaui Hart Hemmings stated that Hawaii Preparatory Academy, which is located in Kamuela, Hawaiʻi (the Big Island), was the inspiration for the private boarding school.

Postproduction began on June 14, and continued into February 2011. The film was screened at the Telluride, Toronto and New York film festivals and was originally scheduled to have a limited release on December 16, 2011, but was moved to November 23, 2011, and then November 18, 2011.

The soundtrack uses Hawaiian music, featuring artists including Gabby Pahinui, Ray Kane, Keola Beamer, Lena Machado, Sonny Chillingworth, Jeff Peterson, Makana, Dennis Kamakahi, and Danny Carvalho. It was released by Sony Classical Records on November 15.

== Reception ==
=== Box office ===
The Descendants opened in North America on November 16, 2011, in a limited release in 29 theaters, and grossed $1,190,096, averaging $41,038 per theater and ranking 10th at the box office. The film then had its wide release on December 9 in 876 theaters, and grossed $4,380,138, averaging $5,000 per theater and ranking seventh at the box office. The film was in cinemas for 156 days and its widest release in the United States was 2,038 theaters. The film ended up earning $82,584,160 domestically and $94,659,025 internationally for a total of $177,243,185.

=== Critical response ===
On Rotten Tomatoes, the film has an approval rating of 88% based on 268 reviews, with an average rating of 8.10/10. The website's critical consensus reads, "Funny, moving, and beautifully acted, The Descendants captures the unpredictable messiness of life with eloquence and uncommon grace." On Metacritic, the film has a weighted average score of 84 out of 100, based on 43 critics, indicating "universal acclaim". Audiences polled by CinemaScore gave the film an average grade of "A−" on an A+ to F scale.

=== Top ten lists ===
The Descendants has appeared on these critics' top-10 lists for the best films of 2011:

Critic	Publication	Rank
Todd McCarthy	The Hollywood Reporter	1st
Betsy Sharkey	Los Angeles Times	1st
Don Kaye	MSN Movies	1st
Stephen Holden	The New York Times	1st
Marshall Fine	Hollywood & Fine	1st
Joe Neumaier	Daily News	2nd
Ann Hornaday	The Washington Post	2nd
Peter Travers	Rolling Stone	3rd
Corben Carpenter	Corben Carpenter's Top Ten Lists	3rd
Michael Phillips	Chicago Tribune	4th
Anne Thompson	IndieWire	4th
Peter Rainer	The Christian Science Monitor	5th
Lisa Schwarzbaum	Entertainment Weekly	6th
Sean Axmaker	MSN Movies	6th
David Denby	The New Yorker	7th
Peter Hartlaub	San Francisco Chronicle	7th
Jaime N. Christley	Slant Magazine	7th
Peter Paras	E! Online	7th
Richard T. Jameson	MSN Movies	9th
—N/a	MTV	9th
Jack Gregson	ScreenGeeks UK	9th

=== Accolades ===
Award	Date of ceremony	Category	Recipient(s)	Result	Ref.
Academy Awards	February 26, 2012	Best Picture	Jim Burke, Alexander Payne, Jim Taylor	Nominated	
Academy Awards	February 26, 2012	Best Director	Alexander Payne	Nominated	
Academy Awards	February 26, 2012	Best Actor	George Clooney	Nominated	
Academy Awards	February 26, 2012	Best Adapted Screenplay	Alexander Payne, Nat Faxon, Jim Rash	Won	
Academy Awards	February 26, 2012	Best Film Editing	Kevin Tent	Nominated	
Argentine Academy of Cinematography Arts and Sciences Awards	2012	Best Foreign Film	Alexander Payne, Jim Burke, Alexander Payne, and Jim Taylor	Nominated	
American Film Institute	2011	Movies of the Year		Won	
Art Directors Guild	2012	Excellence in Contemporary Film	Jane Anne Stewart	Nominated	
Australian Academy of Cinema and Television Arts	January 27, 2012	Best Film – International		Nominated	
Australian Academy of Cinema and Television Arts	January 27, 2012	Best Screenplay – International	Alexander Payne, Nat Faxon, Jim Rash	Nominated	
Australian Academy of Cinema and Television Arts	January 27, 2012	Best Actor – International	George Clooney	Nominated	
Boston Society of Film Critics	December 11, 2011	Best Actor	George Clooney	Nominated	
Boston Society of Film Critics	December 11, 2011	Best Use of Music in a Film		Nominated	
British Academy Film Awards	February 12, 2012	Best Film	Jim Burke, Alexander Payne, Jim Taylor	Nominated	
British Academy Film Awards	February 12, 2012	Best Actor	George Clooney	Nominated	
British Academy Film Awards	February 12, 2012	Best Adapted Screenplay	Alexander Payne, Nat Faxon, Jim Rash	Nominated	
Casting Society of America	2012	Outstanding Achievement in Casting for a Big Budget Drama Feature	John Jackson, John McAlary	Nominated	
Chicago Film Critics Association	December 19, 2011	Best Picture		Nominated	
Chicago Film Critics Association	December 19, 2011	Best Director	Alexander Payne	Nominated	
Chicago Film Critics Association	December 19, 2011	Best Actor	George Clooney	Nominated	
Chicago Film Critics Association	December 19, 2011	Best Supporting Actress	Shailene Woodley	Nominated	
Chicago Film Critics Association	December 19, 2011	Best Adapted Screenplay	Alexander Payne, Nat Faxon, Jim Rash	Nominated	
Chicago Film Critics Association	December 19, 2011	Most Promising Performer	Shailene Woodley	Nominated	
Critics' Choice Movie Awards	January 12, 2012	Best Picture		Nominated	
Critics' Choice Movie Awards	January 12, 2012	Best Actor	George Clooney	Won	
Critics' Choice Movie Awards	January 12, 2012	Best Supporting Actress	Shailene Woodley	Nominated	
Critics' Choice Movie Awards	January 12, 2012	Best Young Actor/Actress	Shailene Woodley	Nominated	
Critics' Choice Movie Awards	January 12, 2012	Best Acting Ensemble	Cast	Nominated	
Critics' Choice Movie Awards	January 12, 2012	Best Director	Alexander Payne	Nominated	
Critics' Choice Movie Awards	January 12, 2012	Best Adapted Screenplay	Alexander Payne, Nat Faxon, Jim Rash	Nominated	
Detroit Film Critics Society	2011	Best Film		Nominated	
Detroit Film Critics Society	2011	Best Actor	George Clooney	Nominated	
Detroit Film Critics Society	2011	Breakthrough Performance	Shailene Woodley	Nominated	
Florida Film Critics Circle	2011	Best Picture		Won	
Florida Film Critics Circle	2011	Best Supporting Actress	Shailene Woodley	Won	
Florida Film Critics Circle	2011	Best Adapted Screenplay	Alexander Payne, Nat Faxon, Jim Rash	Won	
Golden Globes	January 15, 2012	Best Picture – Drama		Won	
Golden Globes	January 15, 2012	Best Director	Alexander Payne	Nominated	
Golden Globes	January 15, 2012	Best Actor – Drama	George Clooney	Won	
Golden Globes	January 15, 2012	Best Supporting Actress	Shailene Woodley	Nominated	
Golden Globes	January 15, 2012	Best Screenplay	Alexander Payne, Nat Faxon, Jim Rash	Nominated	
Grammy Awards	February 10, 2013	Best Compilation Soundtrack For Visual Media		Nominated	
Independent Spirit Awards	February 25, 2012	Best Film		Nominated	
Independent Spirit Awards	February 25, 2012	Best Director	Alexander Payne	Nominated	
Independent Spirit Awards	February 25, 2012	Best Supporting Female	Shailene Woodley	Won	
Independent Spirit Awards	February 25, 2012	Best Screenplay	Alexander Payne, Nat Faxon, Jim Rash	Won	
Los Angeles Film Critics Association	December 11, 2011	Best Film		Won	
Los Angeles Film Critics Association	December 11, 2011	Best Screenplay	Alexander Payne, Nat Faxon, Jim Rash	Nominated	
MTV Movie Awards	June 3, 2012	Best Breakthrough Performance	Shailene Woodley	Won	
National Board of Review	2011	Top 10 Films		Won	
National Board of Review	2011	Best Actor	George Clooney	Won	
National Board of Review	2011	Best Supporting Actress	Shailene Woodley	Won	
National Board of Review	2011	Best Adapted Screenplay	Alexander Payne, Nat Faxon, Jim Rash	Won	
New York Film Critics Online	December 11, 2011	Best Screenplay	Alexander Payne, Nat Faxon, Jim Rash	Won	
Online Film Critics Society	January 2, 2012	Best Picture		Nominated	
Online Film Critics Society	January 2, 2012	Best Actor	George Clooney	Nominated	
Online Film Critics Society	January 2, 2012	Best Supporting Actress	Shailene Woodley	Nominated	
Online Film Critics Society	January 2, 2012	Best Adapted Screenplay	Alexander Payne, Nat Faxon, Jim Rash	Nominated	
Palm Springs International Film Festival	January 5–16, 2012	Chairman's Award	George Clooney (Also for The Ides of March)	Won	
Producers Guild of America	January 21, 2012	Best Theatrical Motion Picture	Jim Burke, Alexander Payne, Jim Taylor	Nominated	
Screen Actors Guild	January 29, 2012	Best Ensemble	Beau Bridges, George Clooney, Robert Forster, Judy Greer, Matthew Lillard, Shailene Woodley	Nominated	
Screen Actors Guild	January 29, 2012	Best Actor	George Clooney	Nominated	
Satellite Awards	December 18, 2011	Satellite Award for Best Film		Won	
Satellite Awards	December 18, 2011	Best Actor	George Clooney	Nominated	
Satellite Awards	December 18, 2011	Best Supporting Actress	Judy Greer	Nominated	
Satellite Awards	December 18, 2011	Best Director	Alexander Payne	Nominated	
Satellite Awards	December 18, 2011	Best Adapted Screenplay	Alexander Payne, Nat Faxon, Jim Rash	Won	
Satellite Awards	December 18, 2011	Best Editing		Nominated	
Washington D.C. Area Film Critics Association	December 5, 2011	Best Actor	George Clooney	Won	
Washington D.C. Area Film Critics Association	December 5, 2011	Best Adapted Screenplay	Alexander Payne, Nat Faxon, Jim Rash	Won	
Washington D.C. Area Film Critics Association	December 5, 2011	Best Film		Nominated	
Washington D.C. Area Film Critics Association	December 5, 2011	Best Director	Alexander Payne	Nominated	
Washington D.C. Area Film Critics Association	December 5, 2011	Best Supporting Actress	Shailene Woodley	Nominated	
