= Amara Miller =

American actress (born 2000)

- Born: May 4, 2000 (age 26)
- Occupation: Actress
- Years active: 2011–present

Amara Miller (born May 4, 2000) is an American actress known for her debut performance in the film The Descendants, for which she won a Young Artist Award.

Miller lives in Pacific Grove, California, with her parents, Ahnalisa and Michael Miller.

== Filmography ==
Year	Film	Role	Notes
2011	The Descendants	Scottie King	Young Artist Awards for Best Performance in a Feature Film – Young Actress Ten and Under; Nominated—Gotham Independent Film Award for Best Ensemble Cast; Nominated—Women Film Critics Circle for Best Young Actress
2012–2013	1600 Penn	Marigold Gilchrist	TV series (13 episodes)
2014	A Merry Friggin' Christmas	Pam	
2022	Early Risers		TV Series
