= Ancestor (sculpture) =

Public art work by Masayuki Nagare

Coordinates: 43°10′35.6″N 87°56′11.8″W

- Artist: Masayuki Nagare
- Year: 1965
- Type: black granite
- Dimensions: 140 cm × 100 cm × 150 cm (57 in × 41 in × 60 in)
- Location: Lynden Sculpture Garden; Milwaukee, Wisconsin

Ancestor is a public art work by artist Masayuki Nagare located at the Lynden Sculpture Garden near Milwaukee, Wisconsin. The abstract black granite sculpture has some highly polished surfaces and some which remain rough; it is installed on the lawn.
