= The Descendants (novel) =

2007 novel by Kaui Hart Hemmings

- First edition
- Author: Kaui Hart Hemmings
- Language: English
- Genre: Fiction
- Publisher: Random House
- Publication date: May 15, 2007
- Publication place: United States
- Media type: Print
- Pages: 304 (First Edition)
- ISBN: 1-4000-6633-6

The Descendants is a novel written by Kaui Hart Hemmings. The 2011 American film The Descendants, directed by Alexander Payne, with the adapted screenplay by Payne, Nat Faxon, and Jim Rash, is based on this novel.

== Plot summary ==
Matthew King was once considered one of the most fortunate men in Hawaii. His missionary ancestors were financially and culturally progressive—one even married a Hawaiian princess, making Matt a royal descendant and one of the state's largest landowners.

Now his luck has changed. His two daughters are out of control: Ten-year-old Scottie is a disrespectful troublemaker with a desperate need for attention, and seventeen-year-old Alex, a former model, is a recovering drug addict. Matt's wife, Joanie, lies in a coma after a boat-racing accident and will soon be taken off life support. The Kings can hardly picture life without her, but as they come to terms with this tragedy, their sadness is mixed with a sense of freedom that shames them—and spurs them into surprising actions.

Before honoring Joanie's living will, Matt must gather her friends and family to say their final goodbyes, a difficult situation made worse by the sudden discovery that there is one person who has not been told: the man with whom Joanie had been having an extramarital affair, quite possibly the one man she ever truly loved. Forced to examine what he owes not only to the living but to the dead, Matt takes to the road with his daughters to find his wife's lover, a memorable journey that leads to both painful revelations and unforeseen humor and growth.

== Real world analogue ==
Bernice Pauahi Bishop was a princess of the Kingdom of Hawaii who married the wealthy mainlander Charles Reed Bishop. Her estate, the Bernice P. Bishop Estate, is now one of America's wealthiest private landholders.

== Reception ==
- Kavenna, Joanna (May 20, 2007). "The Descendants - Kaui Hart Hemmings - Books - Review". The New York Times.

== Film adaptation ==
The Descendants was adapted into a film in 2011 by Alexander Payne, Nat Faxon, and Jim Rash for Fox Searchlight Pictures. It starred George Clooney as Matt, Shailene Woodley as Alex, and Matthew Lillard as Brian Speer. The film was a success both critically and financially and won an Academy Award for Best Adapted Screenplay, as well as two Golden Globe Awards for Best Picture – Drama and Best Actor – Drama for Clooney.
