= The Descendants (2015 film) =

Iranian feature film (2015)

- Directed by: Yaser Talebi
- Screenplay by: Tamana Rastgar Hamid Rassoulpor Yaser Talebi
- Produced by: Mitra Roohimanesh
- Starring: Hassan Rostamani Viktoria Lushnikova; Mehrtash Saeidi Hossein Mirzagholi
- Cinematography: Mahmoodreza Mafi
- Edited by: Yaser Talebi
- Music by: Peyman Yazdanian
- Release date: 2015
- Running time: 80 minutes
- Country: Iran
- Language: Persian-English-Swedish

The Descendants (Persian: Farzandan. فرزندان ) is a 2015 Iranian Tele film directed by Yaser Talebi and produced by Mitra Roohimanesh. The plot concerns an Iranian Jewish man Jacob, played by Hasan Rostamani, who travels to Sweden to look for his son.

== Awards ==
The film was awarded Best Foreign Film Award at the Royal Starr Film Festival in Royal Oak, Michigan, and best film award at Formosa Festival of International Filmmaker Awards in Taiwan. Other awards include: Best Feature Award and Best Director at 6th Urban international film festival, in Iran 2017, Best Feature Award (the 2017 Yonder Winner) at Longleaf Film Festival North Carolina Museum of History, 2017. Best Feature Film at the Pembroke Taparelli Arts and Film Festival Narrative Features International competition, U.S.A. 2016 Best Feature Film at Accolade Global Film Competition Award 2016. Best Board of Director Feature Film at North Carolina Film Award Fall, U.S.A, 2015, and Best Feature Film at The JP2 Inter-Faith Film Festival's Reel Rose Awards, U.S.A, 2015.
