= Jeff Peterson (guitarist) =

Jeff Peterson is an American slack key guitar player from Maui, Hawaii. The son of a paniolo at Haleakala Ranch, Peterson was exposed to the sounds of slack key at an early age.

Peterson's style fuses traditional Slack Key with elements of classical and jazz guitar, at which styles he is also adept. Peterson studied classical guitar at USC's Thornton School of Music before returning to the islands to play and teach in the Honolulu area.

Peterson has contributed to many albums, including a series of slack key and bamboo flute duets with Riley Lee, several slack key compilations including the Grammy Winning album "Slack Key Guitar Volume 2", "Slack Key Guitar: The Artistry of Jeff Peterson", as well as his most recent solo album "Maui On My Mind". He performed at BAM's Next Wave Festival in 2008 in collaboration with the string quartet ETHEL.

His Concerto for Slack Key Guitar, Mālama ʻĀina, commissioned by the Raleigh Civic Symphony Orchestra and their conductor Peter Askim to celebrate the centennial of the National Park Service, was premiered November 6, 2016, by the Raleigh Civic Chamber Orchestra with Peterson as the soloist. Its three movements are dedicated to the three volcanoes in Hawaii that are located within the National Park System: Haleakala, Kilauea, and Mauna Loa. The concerto is featured in Wahi Pana, a full-length feature film DVD (and its soundtrack CD) about the music and life of Peterson. The concerto was given its Hawaii premiere on December 10, 2017, by the Hawaii Symphony Orchestra at Blaisdell Concert Hall with Peterson as the soloist and Carl St. Clair as the conductor.

Peterson has shared the stage with many Hawaiian legends at concerts throughout the islands and Japan, and recently did a stint with the Nashville Symphony.

He was a former guitar professor at the University of Hawaii at Manoa on Oahu.
