= Kitbag question =

Hebrew slang term

A kitbag question (Hebrew: she'elat kitbag) is a Hebrew slang term referring to a question that is better not asked. It is usually directed to a person of authority. The person asking the question (and others) are likely to be negatively affected by the very act of asking the question.

The kitbag question is a classic topic in decision theory.

== Origin ==
The expression originates in an anecdote often told to new conscripts in the Israel Defence Forces; according to the apocryphal story, soldiers had been commanded by their superiors to assemble for a loaded march with their weapons and ammunition vests. One soldier asked whether they should also bring their kitbags. The reply was "good idea, bring the kitbag as well", to everyone else's annoyance. For if he had not asked, the commanders would never have thought to require bringing the kitbag.

The expression began in Israeli army slang, then spread to Israeli society in general, and now has a limited degree of international use.

== Examples ==
Kitbag questions come in two main categories:

- Questions about a task which the questioner must perform, asking the question in hope of sparking a modification or cancellation of the task.
- Questions about unclear instructions. In this case, the questioner has a dilemma: on one hand, wishing to clarify the instructions in order to fulfill them better. On the other hand, the very act of asking is likely to make the instructions more severe.

Kitbag questions can also occur in non-military contexts. A common example is approaching government authorities in order to receive documents (such as a construction permit for a building). It often seems likely that if the questioner asks the authorities whether they must bring a particular document, the answer will always be "yes", whether or not the document is really needed.
