= Dartmoor Yomp =

Annual charitable fundraising event in Devon, England

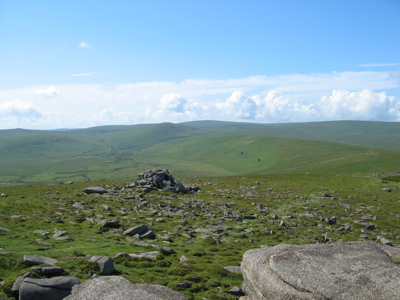
A typical view across Dartmoor.

The Dartmoor Yomp is an annual charitable fundraising event run in aid of the various charities that support injured British Armed Forces Royal Marines. The Yomp is a daytime trek held in the Dartmoor National Park in the county of Devon, England, usually some 12 miles (19 km) in length, and is undertaken by disabled servicemen joined by able-bodied former and serving Royal Marines and their immediate families. The challenge is usually held over two days in September: a get-together on the Friday and the actual Yomp on the Saturday. The Dartmoor Yomp takes its name from the Royal Marines slang term "yomp", meaning a route march carrying full kit. It was founded in 2008.

The initial event in 2008 took place on 26–28 September. In 2009 the event took place on 18 and 19 September and the charities supported were Help for Heroes, BLESMA, Combat Stress and St Dunstan's. In 2010 the proceeds went to the Royal Marines Charitable Trust Fund.

The 2010 event took place on 10 and 11 September 2010. Its route was changed to allow the filming of the Steven Spielberg film War Horse to continue undisturbed.
