= Ditsworthy Warren House =

Coordinates: 50°28′44.96″N 3°59′49.18″W

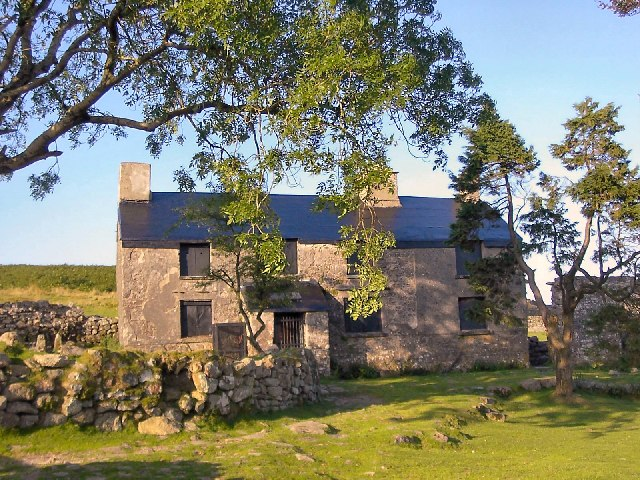
- Ditsworthy Warren House in 2004.
- Interactive map of the Ditsworthy Warren House area

General information
- Type: Farmhouse

Ditsworthy Warren House is a Grade II listed building near Gutter Tor in Devon, England. It is an isolated building on the south-western edge of Dartmoor, and was built for the keeper of the rabbit warren near the house. It was used in 2010 as a filming location for the Steven Spielberg film, War Horse.

== History and construction ==
The dating of the house is open to some debate. The official listing for the house, compiled by an architectural historian for the Department of the Environment (now English Heritage) on 15 April 1978 suggests that the oldest part of the house dates from the late 18th century or early to mid 19th century. English Heritage's Pastscape page for Ditsworthy Warren states "The Warren House ... is said to be 16th century and may well have been built on the site of a previous house (The original Ditsworthy Farm?). The building has been added to at some fairly recent period, and in that addition and in various outhouses attached ... Externally it appears to be entirely of 19th century construction" whereas the Pastscape page for Ditsworthy Warren House itself says it "has six well-preserved but ruined out-buildings. It is first mentioned in 1474 but is very probably earlier. As it stands the warren house is of probably late 16th or early 17th-century construction on earlier foundations."

The walls are built of granite rubble; only some of the external render that covered the stonework still survives. The original roofing material would have been stone roof tiles. Originally the house comprised a symmetrical two-storey building with central door and porch, but in the late 19th century a one-room, two-storey extension was added to the right-hand end of the house. Next to the house is a shippon stand, the animal living quarters.

== Ditsworthy Warren ==
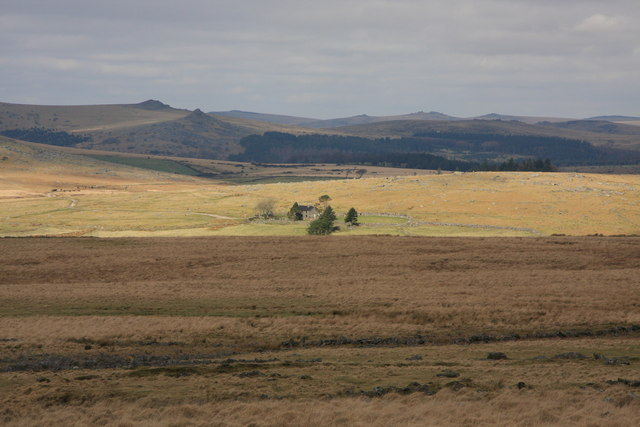
Ditsworthy Warren House, showing its isolated location on Dartmoor, looking across Hentor Meadow to the house with Leather Tor and Sharpitor in the left background.

The house was built for the keeper of Ditsworthy Warren, an area of land covering approximately a square kilometre, where rabbits were commercially bred and kept for their meat and fur. The rabbits lived in "pillow mounds", long cigar-shaped structures in the area built of stone and covered with earth, in which the rabbits could burrow and live. Dartmoor was suitable for rabbit keeping as it was poor agricultural land (rabbits and crops don't mix happily), and had a good supply of stone for constructing the pillow mounds, walls and vermin traps needed at these sites.

Ditsworthy Warren comprises 53 pillow mounds, averaging 16m long, 7.2m wide and 1m high. In addition, there is the "Kennel Court" in the field immediately to the east of the house, where the warren dogs were kept. The walls of the court are six feet high to prevent the dogs from escaping. Ditsworthy Warren was the largest rabbit warren in England.

== Recent use ==
The house was abandoned in 1947. The roof tiles have been removed and the roof is covered with felt; the windows are closed with modern shutters. The shippon stand is partly ruined. The house and land is owned by the Maristow Estate.

The house is situated within the Dartmoor National Park. Three bridleways converge on Ditsworthy Warren House, and so it is a popular place for leisure users of Dartmoor, such as ramblers, letterboxers and geocachers, horseriders and mountain bikers. There is no vehicular right of way to the house, and apart from access on the bridleways, the land immediately surrounding the house is not open to the public.

The British Armed Forces regularly train on Dartmoor, and Ditsworthy Warren House is leased by the Admiralty and used as part of the Dartmoor Training Area, as a "stone tent", a farm building used to provide basic shelter. The house can hold 23 troops, and there is space in the area around the house for additional tents.

In August 2010 Ditsworthy Warren House was used as a filming location for the Steven Spielberg film, War Horse, serving as the Narracott family's farmhouse. The house was dressed for the film, with thatched roof and window shutters added, as well as a lean-to wood store. In addition, a cruck framed building set was built close by, to serve as the barn. The set was dismantled after filming and the restoration of the site to its pre-existing state was undertaken. One of the first official publicity stills released in March 2011 shows lead actor Jeremy Irvine as Albert Narracott and Emily Watson as his mother Rose Narracott in a kitchen scene at Ditsworthy Warren House. By coincidence, two local novice film-makers who had been hoping to film at Ditsworthy Warren House at the same time found out about Spielberg's use of the site only weeks before their filming was due to commence. They filmed at Nun's Cross Farmhouse near Princetown as their alternative location.

War Horse production designer Rick Carter said of Ditsworthy Warren House: "Finally in Dartmoor we found a derelict building in the middle of nowhere that we brought back to life. It had 360-degree views, which give it a sense of being part of something huge and imposing — the expanse of skies, the force of the elements — and that created a beauty beyond what we had hoped for."

On 16 March 2011 a local blogger published an account of her unofficial visit to the War Horse set at Ditsworthy Warren House during filming, and despite the security on-set, was able to take photographs of the interior of the set and of Steven Spielberg.

== Gallery ==
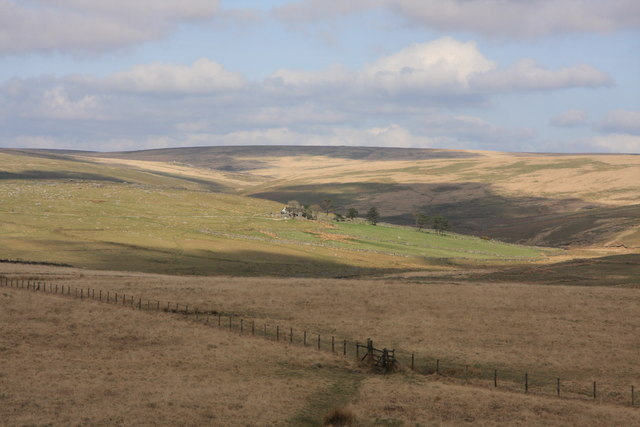
Ditsworthy Warren House and Plym Valley viewed from Legis Tor.

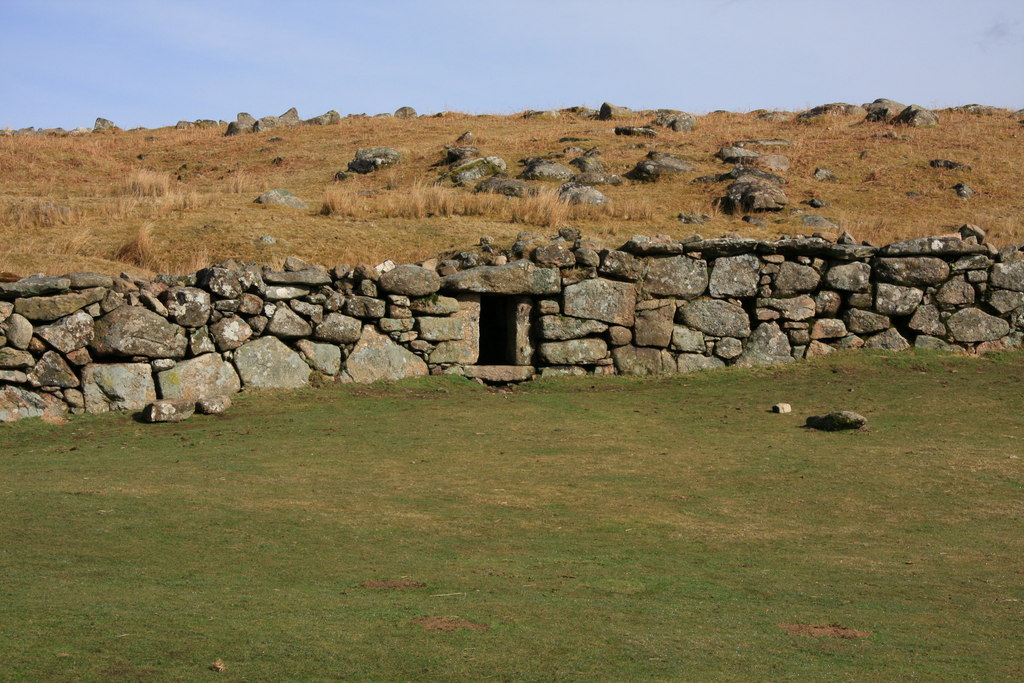
Dog kennel next to Ditsworthy Warren House.
