= Andrew Robertshaw =

- Born: Doncaster, England
- Writing career
- Genre: Non-fiction
- Subject: Military history

Andrew Robertshaw (born 1956) is a British military historian, curator, author and educator who specialises in the history of the First World War. He is best known for his television appearances, in programmes such as Two Men in a Trench and Time Team. He was a military history advisor on the films War Horse 1917 and They Shall Not Grow Old.

Robertshaw was born in Doncaster, England. During his career he has worked as Curator/Manager of the Royal Logistic Corps Museum in Deepcut, and previously as Head of Education at The National Army Museum in London.

He is now director of BattleFields Partnerships Limited. He is also the lead historian for The Centre For Experimental Military Archaeology (CEMA) at the Kent Show Ground.

== Works ==
- A Soldier's Life (1997)
- Warfare in the 16th-19th Centuries: The Age of Empires (Battle Zone) (2003) (with Mark Bergin)
- Somme 1 July 1916: Tragedy and Triumph (Campaign) (2006)
- Feeding Tommy: Battlefield Recipes from the First World War
- Digging the Trenches: the Archaeology of the Western Front (with David Kenyon)
- Ghosts on the Somme: Filming the Battle, June–July 1916 (2009) (With Alastair Fraser and Steve Roberts)
- The Hard Way: Surviving Shamshuipo POW Camp 1941-45 (2011)
- The Platoon: An Infantryman on the Western Front 1916-18 (2012) (with Steve Roberts)
- Frontline Cookbook: Battlefield Recipes from the Second World War (2012)
- 24hr Trench: A Day in the Life of a Frontline Tommy (2012)
- 24hr Under Attack: Tommy Defends the Frontline (2014)
- 5 Minute History: First World War Trenches (2014)
- Somme 1916 (Battle Story) (2014)
- Film War Horse (2010)
- Film They Shall Not Grow Old (2018)
- Film 1917 (2019)
