= War Horse (film) =

2011 film by Steven Spielberg

- Theatrical release poster
- Directed by: Steven Spielberg
- Screenplay by: Lee Hall; Richard Curtis
- Based on: War Horse (novel) by Michael Morpurgo; War Horse (play) by Nick Stafford
- Produced by: Steven Spielberg; Kathleen Kennedy
- Starring: Emily Watson; David Thewlis; Peter Mullan; Niels Arestrup; Jeremy Irvine
- Cinematography: Janusz Kamiński
- Edited by: Michael Kahn
- Music by: John Williams
- Production companies: DreamWorks Pictures; Reliance Entertainment; Amblin Entertainment; The Kennedy/Marshall Company
- Distributed by: Walt Disney Studios Motion Pictures (Note: Distributed by Walt Disney Studios Motion Pictures through the Touchstone Pictures banner.) (Worldwide); Reliance Entertainment (India)
- Release dates: 5 December 2011 (Avery Fisher Hall); 25 December 2011 (United States)
- Running time: 146 minutes
- Countries: India; United States; United Kingdom
- Language: English
- Budget: $66–70 million
- Box office: $177.6 million

War Horse is a 2011 war drama film directed and produced by Steven Spielberg, from a screenplay written by Lee Hall and Richard Curtis. It is based on Michael Morpurgo's 1982 novel and its 2007 stage adaptation. The film features an ensemble cast that includes Peter Mullan, Emily Watson, Niels Arestrup, Jeremy Irvine (in his feature film debut), David Thewlis, Tom Hiddleston and Benedict Cumberbatch. Set before and during World War I, its plot follows Joey, a bay Irish Hunter horse raised by English teenager Albert as he is bought by the British Army, leading him to encounter various people throughout Europe, in the midst of the war and its tragedies.

DreamWorks Pictures acquired the film rights to the novel in December 2009, and Spielberg was announced to direct in May 2010. Having directed several films set during World War II, it was his first to tackle the events of World War I. Shot in England over 63 days, the production used 5,800 extras and 300 horses. Several longtime Spielberg collaborators—including producer Kathleen Kennedy, cinematographer Janusz Kamiński, editor Michael Kahn, production designer Rick Carter and composer John Williams—worked on the film.

Produced by DreamWorks and distributed worldwide by Walt Disney Studios Motion Pictures through the Touchstone Pictures label, War Horse became a box-office success (earning $177 million on a $70 million budget) and was met with positive reviews. The film was named one of the ten best films of 2011 by the American Film Institute and the National Board of Review, and was nominated for six Academy Awards (including Best Picture), two Golden Globes and five BAFTAs.

== Plot ==
A bay Irish Hunter is born in Devon, England in 1912. Farmer Ted Narracott outbids his landlord Lyons for the colt at auction, to the dismay of his wife Rose who wanted a working horse that can plough, not an Irish Hunter. Their son Albert, with his best friend Andrew, names the colt Joey, and teaches him to come when he imitates an owl's call. The horse and boy, now closely bonded, plough a rocky field, permitting the planting of turnips and saving the family's farm.

Rose shows Albert his father's medals, including a Distinguished Conduct Medal, from the Second Boer War, and gives him Ted's regimental pennant, confiding in Albert that his father carries physical and mental scars from the war.

When war with Germany is declared in 1914, heavy rain ruins the family's crops, forcing Ted to sell Joey to an army officer, Captain James Nicholls, who sees Albert's heartbreak and promises to look after Joey. Albert is too young to enlist, and ties the pennant to Joey's bridle, promising he will eventually find him.

Joey bonds with Topthorn, a black stallion with whom he is trained for his military role. The horses are deployed to Flanders with a flying column under the command of Nicholls and Major Stewart. They lead a cavalry charge through a German encampment defended by hidden machine guns. Nicholls and most of the cavalrymen are killed and the Germans capture the horses.

Gunther, a young volunteer, grooms Joey and Topthorn. When his younger brother Michael is sent to the front lines, Gunther deserts with his brother on the horses. The German army captures the boys and executes them, leaving the horses unattended. They are found by Emilie, a French girl, the next morning, and she hides them from German soldiers in her bedroom at her grandfather's farm. Emilie's grandfather allows her to ride Joey for her birthday, but they are discovered and captured by the Germans while Emilie's grandfather keeps the pennant.

By 1918, Albert has enlisted and is fighting alongside Andrew in the Second Battle of the Somme where Andrew is killed and Albert temporarily blinded by an exploding gas bomb.

The Germans use Joey and Topthorn to haul artillery under the care of Private Friedrich Hengelmann. Topthorn succumbs to exhaustion from overwork and dies. Devastated over this loss, Hengelmann rebels against his commanders and frees Joey from his reins. Joey gallops into no man's land and evades a tank but is entangled in barbed wire. Colin, a British soldier, makes his way to Joey under a white flag and tries to free him. Peter, a German soldier, comes over with wire cutters, and together they rescue Joey. They flip a coin for ownership of the horse, and Colin guides the injured Joey to the British lines. Albert hears about Joey's rescue while recuperating. Just as Joey is about to be put down by a doctor who deems the horse too injured to recover, Joey hears Albert's owl call. Albert, his eyes still bandaged, is able to describe Joey in perfect detail, and the two are reunited. The doctor nurses Joey back to health.

After the Great War ends Joey is put up for auction. Albert's comrades raise a collection to bid against a wealthy French butcher. Emilie's grandfather wins the auction, implying she has died and the horse is all he has left of her. After Albert pleads with him, the old man recognises the strength of the soldier's bond, returning the pennant and Joey to Albert. Albert returns with Joey to his family's farm, embracing his mother and returning the pennant to his father, who extends his hand to him with pride as Joey watches.

== Cast ==
- Emily Watson as Rose Narracott
- David Thewlis as Lyons
- Peter Mullan as Ted Narracott
- Niels Arestrup as Grandfather
- Jeremy Irvine as Albert Narracott
- Tom Hiddleston as Captain James Nicholls
- Benedict Cumberbatch as Major Jamie Stewart
- Céline Buckens as Emilie
- Toby Kebbell as Colin
- Patrick Kennedy as Lieutenant Charlie Waverly
- Leonard Carow as Private Michael Schröder
- David Kross as Private Gunther Schröder
- Matt Milne as Andrew Easton
- Robert Emms as David Lyons
- Eddie Marsan as Sergeant Fry
- Nicolas Bro as Private Friedrich Hengelmann
- Rainer Bock as Brandt
- Hinnerk Schönemann as Peter
- Gary Lydon as Si Easton
- Geoff Bell as Sergeant Sam Perkins
- Liam Cunningham as British Army Doctor
- Sebastian Hulk as German Officer at Darm
- Gerard McSorley as Market Auctioneer
- Tony Pitts as Sergeant Martin
- Pip Torrens as Major Tompkins
- Philippe Nahon as French Auctioneer
- Jean-Claude Lecas as Butcher
- Julian Wadham as British Captain in Trench
- David Dencik as German Base Camp Officer
- Edward Bennett as Cavalry Recruiting Officer
- Johnny Harris as Infantry Recruiting Officer
- Tam Dean Burn as British Medic in Trench
- Maximilian Brückner as German Artillery Officer
- Michael Ryan as British Trench Soldier
- Maggie Ollerenshaw as The Neighbor

== Production ==
=== Background and development ===
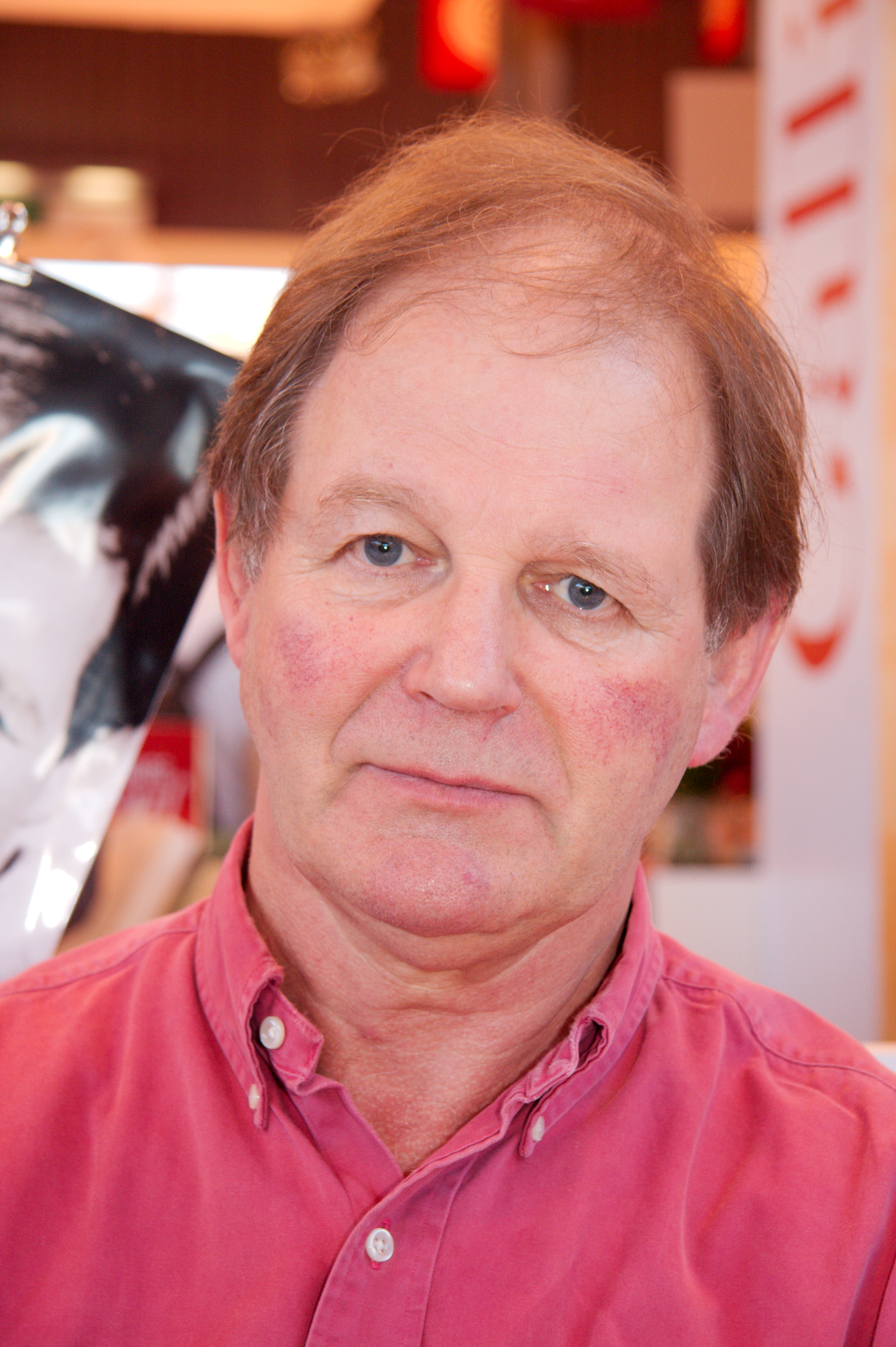
Michael Morpurgo, the author of the novel on which the film is based

Michael Morpurgo wrote the 1982 children's novel War Horse after meetings and conversations with World War I veterans at the Duke of York pub in the Devon village of Iddesleigh where he lived. One had been with the Devon Yeomanry and was involved with horses; Captain Budgett, another veteran in his village, was with the British cavalry and told Morpurgo how he had confided all his hopes and fears to his horse. Both told him of the horrific conditions and loss of life, human and animal, during the Great War. Morpurgo researched the subject further and learned that a million horses died on the British side; he extrapolated an overall figure of 10 million horse deaths on all sides. Of the million horses that were sent abroad from the UK, only 62,000 returned, the rest dying in the war or slaughtered in France for meat.

The Great War had a massive and indelible impact on the UK's male population: 886,000 men died, one in eight of those who went to war, and 2% of the entire country's population. After observing a young boy with a stammer forming a fond relationship with and talking fluently to a horse at a farm run by Morpurgo's charity Farms for City Children, Morpurgo found a way to tell the story through the horse and its relations with the various people it meets before and during the course of the war: a young Devon farmboy, a British cavalry officer, a German soldier, and an old Frenchman and his granddaughter.

"I won't kid you, it was more money [for the film rights] than I've ever been paid for anything I've ever written. But that wasn't the temptation. The temptation was the chance for an iconic film about the First World War, perhaps as great as All Quiet on the Western Front with its overpowering sense of waste."

— Michael Morpurgo

Morpurgo tried to adapt the book into a film screenplay, working for over five years with Simon Channing-Williams, which would ultimately go unproduced. The book was successfully adapted for a stage play by Nick Stafford in 2007. From 2006 to 2009, Morpurgo, Lee Hall and Revel Guest worked on a proposed film version of War Horse, which Morpurgo and Hall would write and Guest produce. Lack of finances meant that it was an informal arrangement, with the film rights not formally sold by Morpurgo to Guest's production company and no one being paid for the work they undertook. In 2009, film producer Kathleen Kennedy saw the critically acclaimed production of War Horse in London's West End with her husband, fellow producer Frank Marshall, and their two daughters. They were very impressed by the story, and Marshall recalled how he was amazed that no one had already bought the film rights to the book.

Steven Spielberg was told about War Horse by several people, including Kennedy, his colleague at Amblin Entertainment. After discussions with Revel Guest, on 16 December 2009, it was announced that DreamWorks Pictures had acquired the film rights to the book, with Spielberg stating: "From the moment I read Michael Morpurgo's novel War Horse, I knew this was a film I wanted DreamWorks to make … Its heart and its message provide a story that can be felt in every country." Spielberg saw the London production of the play on 1 February 2010, and met some of the cast afterwards. He admitted to being moved to tears by the performance.

DreamWorks executive Stacey Snider suggested Richard Curtis to work on rewrites for the screenplay; she had worked with Curtis during her time at Universal Pictures, and Curtis had previously written the World War I-set BBC comedy series Blackadder Goes Forth along with Ben Elton. Spielberg was a fan of Blackadder but had never met Curtis, who was initially reluctant to take part, but on meeting Spielberg, he rethought and committed to work on the script. Curtis stated that the screenplay is closer to the book than the play, and that "the existence of the play itself helped [him] "be brave" about [his] own adaptation". Curtis produced over a dozen drafts in three months, and has spoken of the close collaboration he had with Spielberg while working on the script.

Having previously only been slated to produce the film, Spielberg decided to direct "the second [he] read [Curtis's] first draft. It happened faster than anything else we've [Spielberg and Snider] done together." On 3 May 2010, it was announced that Spielberg was to direct the film; the cast was announced on 17 June. Speaking at the Tribeca Film Festival in April 2011, actor Peter Mullan said that he took the part not just because Spielberg was directing, but also because of the "beautiful, really nice script".

Within weeks of hearing from Kennedy about the London theatre production, Spielberg had seen the play, and decided this would be his next film. Spielberg was able to act so quickly because he was on a hiatus, waiting for the animation on his other 2011 film The Adventures of Tintin to be completed.

Spielberg had previously worked on numerous projects with World War II themes. In contrast, War Horse is Spielberg's first foray into World War I storytelling, as he admitted that, prior to learning about the War Horse book and play, "I had never been that interested in World War I". Kathleen Kennedy elaborated on the appeal of the story: "In cinema we've told very few stories about World War I and I think that's one of the things that attracted us to this … It's a forgotten war in the United States, and that had a very powerful effect on Steven and I." David Kenyon and Andrew Robertshaw of Battlefield Partnerships were military advisors on the film.

=== Casting ===
After some speculation, the cast for War Horse was announced on 17 June 2010. It had been rumored in the previous week that Eddie Redmayne had been cast in the lead role as Albert Narracott; however, relatively unknown stage actor Jeremy Irvine was chosen instead. Spielberg commented that after seeing hundreds of young boys reading for the role, Irvine had come in and done a cold reading and that "his performance was very natural, very authentic." Irvine auditioned for two months, going in two or three times a week, and learned that he had the part when he was asked to read a piece of the script on camera in order to check his West Country accent, and the piece of mockup script that he read out was Albert telling Joey that Spielberg wanted him to play the part.

The cast is European, with British, French and German actors playing characters of their respective nationalities. Robert Emms, who played the lead of Albert Narracott in the West End production of the play, was cast as David Lyons.

Casting for extras took place in Devon in late July 2010. In all, some 5,800 extras were used in the film. The granddaughter of Captain Budgett, one of the World War I veterans who had inspired Morpurgo to write the story, acted as an extra in scenes filmed in Castle Combe, and Morpurgo himself filmed a cameo role there, along with his wife Clare.

=== Filming ===
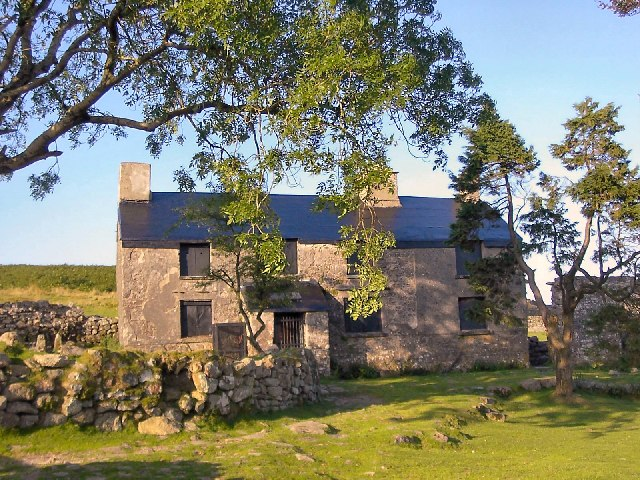
Ditsworthy Warren House on Dartmoor, which served as the Narracott family farmhouse in the film

Filming took place under the codename Dartmoor to maintain a level of secrecy during production, and took about 64 days in total. Scenes involving the cavalry were shot first at Stratfield Saye House in north Hampshire, the estate of the Duke of Wellington, where incidentally Wellington's war horse Copenhagen is buried; a cavalry charge involving 130 extras was filmed here.

Filming on location in Dartmoor, Devon, started in August 2010. Initially, Spielberg was only going to have four or five days' worth of second unit material shot in Devon, but after Kathleen Kennedy sent him photographs of the various locations she had scouted, he decided to cut other elements of the story to enable more filming to take place in countryside that Kennedy described as "so extraordinarily beautiful and absolutely perfect for the story". Dartmoor locations included the small villages of Meavy and Sheepstor, Burrator Reservoir, Bonehill Rocks and the surrounding area near Widecombe-in-the-Moor, Ringmoor Down, Combestone Tor and the surrounding area, Haytor, Hexworthy Bridge, and Cadover Bridge/Brisworthy. Ditsworthy Warren House, an isolated Grade II listed building near Sheepstor on Dartmoor, served as the Narracott family's farmhouse, and many scenes were filmed in the surrounding area.

On 11 September 2010, the annual Dartmoor Yomp was rerouted to allow filming to continue undisturbed. Spielberg praised the Dartmoor countryside's beauty: "I have never before, in my long and eclectic career, been gifted with such an abundance of natural beauty as I experienced filming War Horse on Dartmoor… And, with two-and-a-half weeks of extensive coverage of landscapes and skies, I hardly scratched the surface of the visual opportunities that were offered to me". Spielberg felt that the landscape was very much a character in the film. When actor Peter Mullan won the Golden Shell Award at the San Sebastián International Film Festival in Spain for his film Neds, Spielberg insisted that Mullan should attend the ceremony to accept his award in person on 26 September 2010, and rearranged the War Horse shooting schedule accordingly.

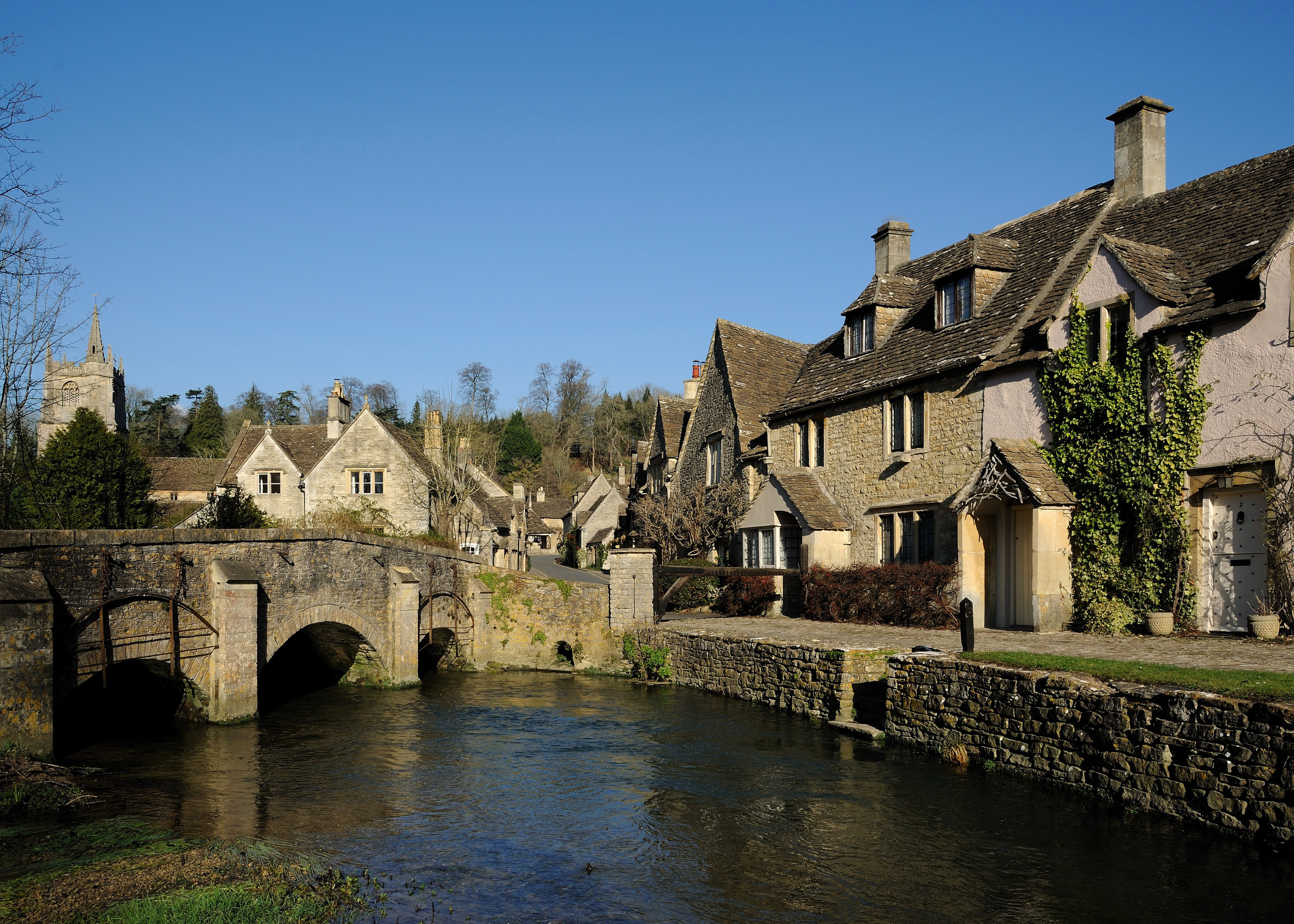
Castle Combe in Wiltshire, another filming location

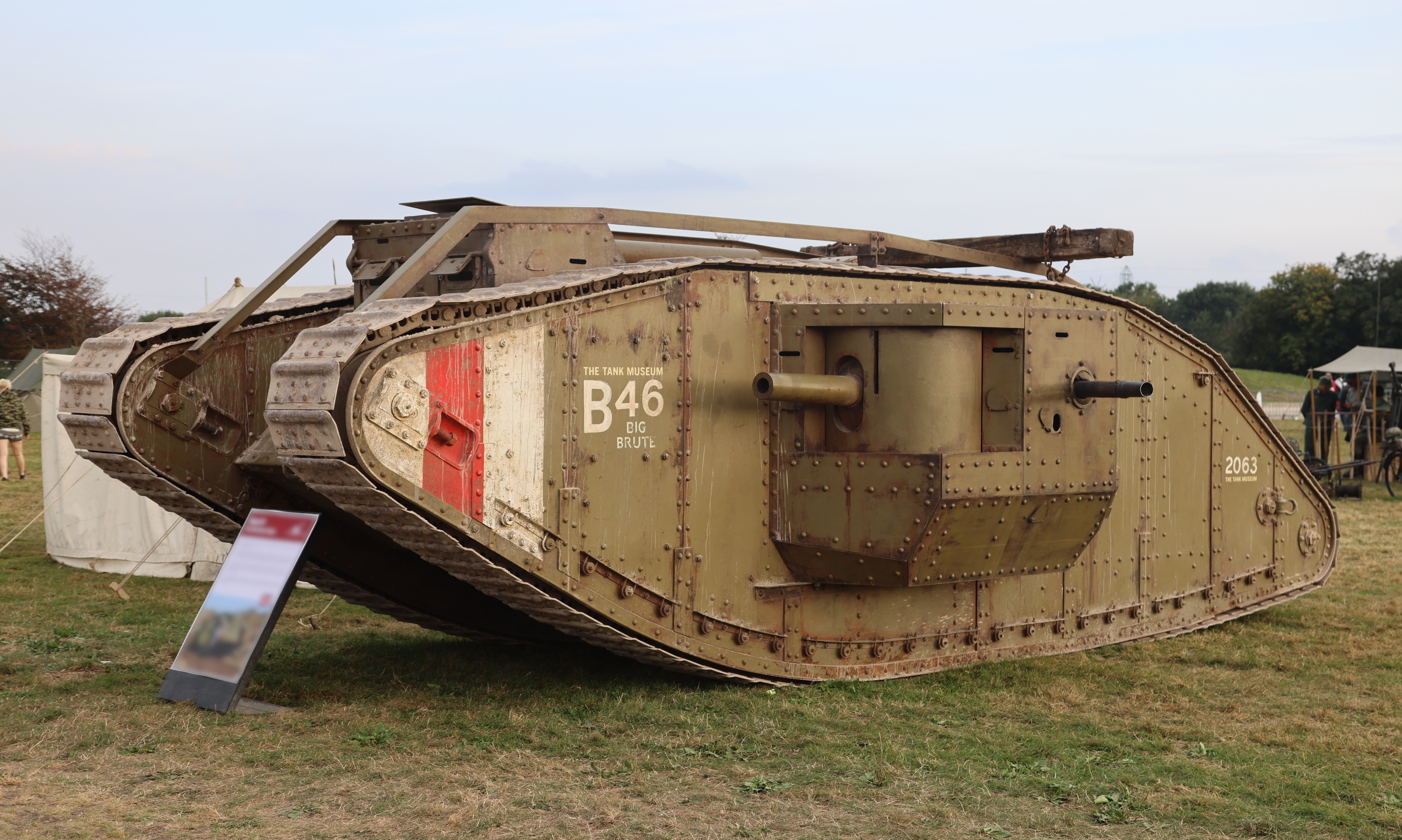
The MK IV tank prop used in the film

Although Devon rural locations were used, scenes in the main village in the story were filmed at the Wiltshire village of Castle Combe near Chippenham, despite the vernacular architecture of Devon (predominantly cob walls and thatched roofs) being very different from that of Wiltshire (stone walls and stone tiled roofs). Filming began there on 21 September 2010, and continued until 1 October. Some residents of Castle Combe were angered by the imposition of tightened security within the village, claiming they could not enter without waiting at perimeter barriers until breaks in filming.

Production moved on to Wisley Airfield in Surrey, where no man's land battlefield scenes were filmed. Shooting of wartime camp scenes also took place at Bourne Wood near Farnham in Surrey, a frequent location for filming, for about two weeks beginning on 4 October 2010. Scenes were shot at the stately home Luton Hoo between 13 and 14 October 2010. Filming was also scheduled to be undertaken at Caerwent in Wales. Studio filming was undertaken at Longcross Studios, Chertsey in Surrey, and at Twickenham Film Studios. The film shoot was completed in the last week of October 2010, with the entire film, French scenes included, being shot in the UK, apart from some pick-up shots of a bay foal filmed in California in March 2011. Spielberg commented on how he and cinematographer Janusz Kamiński developed the "look" of the film: "…it doesn't feel like Ryan at all … it has a much more daguerreotype feel, much more brownish. We're not using any of the techniques we used on Ryan. The only similarity is that it is war and it is handheld."

"The Michael Morpurgo book is ‘Black Beauty goes to war’. So if you’re English, two of the most emotive subjects you could touch on are Black Beauty and the First World War. The crew were constantly in tears, as there were war memorials and everybody had a story in their family ... for English people, everyone is touched by that war."

— Emily Watson on World War I's enduring emotional legacy.

Michael Morpurgo, the author of the book on which the film is based, visited the set several times while filming was being undertaken: "Spielberg's a wonderful storyteller and a kid. He adores stories and that's what he's best at. It's extraordinary to meet someone with that kind of enthusiasm, utterly unspoiled … When I went to visit him on set, he was clearly enthralled by the countryside. He fell for Devon in a big way. He was warm, kind and open, and utterly without ego … Spielberg was like a conductor with a very light baton. He hardly had to wave it at all. I was in awe." Emily Watson also praised Spielberg's approach: "It was intimate, passionate and about the acting. And every single priority that as an actor that you would want to be there was there. It felt very real and focused." "On set, he'd come in, in the morning, and say, 'I couldn't sleep last night. I was worrying about this shot!' Which was great! He's human and he's still working in an impassioned way, like a 21-year-old, trying to make the best out of everything".

=== Horses ===
"When I'm on an Indy movie, I'm watching Indiana Jones, not the horse he is riding ... Suddenly I'm faced with the challenge of making a movie where I not only had to watch the horse, I had to compel the audience to watch it along with me. I had to pay attention to what it was doing and understand its feelings. It was a whole new experience for me."

— Steven Spielberg

The pre-production period only allowed for three months to train the horses before shooting commenced. The main horse trainer was Bobby Lovgren, and other horse trainers included Dylan Jones, Bill Lawrence, and Zelie Bullen.

During filming, fourteen different horses were used as the main horse character Joey, eight of them portraying him as an adult animal, four as a colt and two as a foal; four horses played the other main equine character, Topthorn. Up to 280 horses were used in a single scene. A farrier was on set to replace horseshoes sucked off in the mud during filming, and the horses playing the main horse characters had a specialist equine make-up team, with their coats dyed and markings added to ensure continuity. Equine artist Ali Bannister was responsible for the "hair and makeup" of the horses, as well as drawing the sketches of horses that are featured in the film. Extra filming involving a bay foal took place in California in March 2011. Working with horses on this scale was a new experience for Spielberg, who commented: "The horses were an extraordinary experience for me, because several members of my family ride. I was really amazed at how expressive horses are and how much they can show what they're feeling."

Representatives of the American Humane Association were on set at all times, and the Association awarded the film an "outstanding" rating for the care that was taken of the animals during production. An animatronic horse was used for some parts of the scenes where Joey is trapped in barbed wire; the wire was rubber prop wire. Unlike the play, which used puppet horses, the film uses a combination of real horses, animatronic horses and computer-generated imagery.

=== Post-production ===
Editor Michael Kahn spoke of his work on the film: "We have some shots in War Horse that are just fantastic … We shot it in Devon, and you know it's gorgeous down there, and the horses are beautiful and the farms are beautiful, beautiful scenery and every shot is gorgeous, and eventually you get to the war part of it and it's really, really something." Kahn had a trailer on set and edited the film during filming. Kahn and Spielberg cut the film digitally on an Avid rather than on film, a first with this technology for Spielberg; "He decided that he'd like to try it", Kahn commented.

After filming, further editing was undertaken at the UK's Twickenham Film Studios, with the production moving back to the U.S. in November 2010. Kahn also said of his work on the film: "We put together here in Hollywood. It worked well … Those English actors are awfully good and so were the horses. The horses were beautifully trained. For an editor there were a lot of match [frame] problems with the horses but the shooting was so good that I got everything I needed."

Visual effects for the film were undertaken by London-based company Framestore. According to Spielberg, the film's only digital effects were three shots lasting three seconds, which were undertaken to ensure the safety of the horse involved: "That's the thing I'm most proud of. Everything you see on screen really happened." Kathleen Kennedy elaborated, stating "We really did it very naturalistically. There isn't a lot of blood. Steven wasn't interested in bringing Private Ryan into it, but we did want to make a PG-13 movie." Actor Tom Hiddleston said that Spielberg had "seen the stage play and he wanted to retain the magic and heartbeat of that … It's a moving, powerful story you can take children to see, but it is still very upsetting … People die, and it is war."

== Soundtrack ==
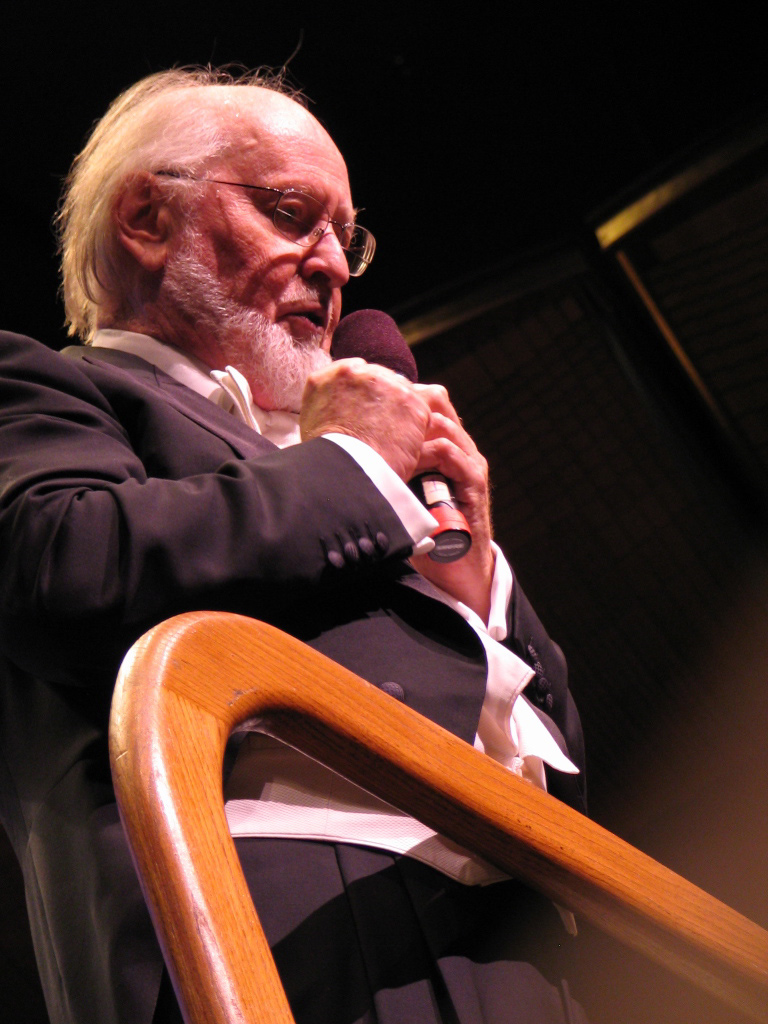
John Williams' work on the film would garner him his 47th Academy Award nomination.

John Williams composed and conducted the film's musical score, the second score composed the same year by Williams for Spielberg after The Adventures of Tintin. Williams took inspiration by visiting a horse farm in California and observing horses and their behavior, saying that "I got in the habit of watching the horses in the morning, and I began to see how they connect to each other and how they became curious about me. That's when I really began to get the sense that horses are very special creatures. They have been magnificent and trusted friends for such a long time and have done so much for us with such grace."

The score was recorded by a 90-piece orchestra and Williams compared the recording sessions more to a concert piece rather than a traditional film score, as it relied more on the individual performance of the musicians. It was recorded in late March and early April 2011. Tuba player Jim Self reported in May 2011: "For John Williams I recently finished recording for the film War Horse. It's a war movie so the score has a lot of brass—but it was gentle music often." The score was released by Sony Classical Records on 21 December 2011 to critical acclaim.

== Release ==
"To round out the year, Steven Spielberg's War Horse appears in time for the festive period. If you're thinking that nothing says Christmas like the bloody trench warfare carnage, you may be in luck. But while Spielberg isn't one to sugarcoat the horrors of war, he's just the director to fill this Great War-set story of a boy and his horse with saddlebags of heart and soul. We can't wait to see how he's brought the colossally popular stage play to the big screen."

— Empire magazine

War Horse was distributed in North America by Walt Disney Studios Motion Pictures through its Touchstone Pictures label on 25 December 2011, making it the first Spielberg-directed film to be distributed through Walt Disney Studios. The film's North American release date was originally set for 10 August 2011, but after a meeting in London between DreamWorks and Disney executives in early October 2010, when some footage was screened, the decision was taken to move its release to 28 December in the holiday period, and in the United Kingdom on 13 January 2012. DreamWorks executive Stacey Snider said, "The reaction to the footage—which [Spielberg] usually never shows—was that it feels like a big, holiday movie … It just became inevitable that we would move it. [Spielberg] feels great about it."

Only a very few unofficial on-set images and clips of video footage were published in the press and online during the filming period. Due to the usual embargo on photos and videos being taken and made public during Spielberg shoots, very few images emerged, with the majority being snatched paparazzi shots. In October 2010, cinematographer Kamiński posted an on-set image of himself on a battlefield set on his Facebook page. The first ten official photographs were made public by DreamWorks in several releases between 11 and 14 March 2011, in Empire magazine and in an article in Entertainment Weekly. On 16 March 2011, a British blogger published an account of her unofficial visit to the War Horse set at Ditsworthy Warren House, and was able to take pictures of the set's interior and of Steven Spielberg despite the security on set. On 29 March, DreamWorks presented behind-the-scenes footage introduced on film by Spielberg to theatre owners at CinemaCon in Las Vegas. Spielberg was unable to attend in person as he was still working on post-production.

On 29 June 2011, the film's first official teaser trailer was released, and the official website was launched. On its launch, the website was rather sparse, with only the official trailer and synopsis, and two of the ten previously released official images. Further footage introduced on film by Spielberg was shown at the Empire magazine "Big Screen" event in London in August 2011. Jeremy Irvine talked about his experiences making the film at the same event. The full theatrical trailer was released on 4 October 2011, and more on-set pictures were released on 17 November.

The publicity strategy for War Horse unusually featured preview screenings for the public in U.S. heartland areas before either the critics were shown the film or it was screened to the public in major metropolitan areas. The first preview screenings of War Horse were held at various locations across the United States on 1, 2 and 10 November 2011. More preview screenings in the U.S. took place on 27 November, with Spielberg attending a question and answer session at the New York screening that was beamed to the other screening cinemas and shown live on the internet.

Press screenings for critics were first held in New York and Los Angeles on 24 November 2011, although there was an embargo on official reviews being published at that time. On 27 November, there was a special screening in London for the crew and cast, the first time anyone involved with the film (apart from Spielberg and his close collaborators) had seen it. Three television advertisements for the film were released in the U.S. on 24 November 2011, shortly followed by others.

On 4 December 2011, the film's world premiere was held at the Avery Fisher Hall of New York City's Lincoln Center, where the Tony award-winning Broadway production of War Horse was playing at the neighboring Vivian Beaumont Theater. The UK premiere took place in London's Leicester Square on 8 January 2012, and was attended by Prince William, Duke of Cambridge and his wife Catherine, Duchess of Cambridge.

A tie-in book by Steven Spielberg was published by HarperCollins on 27 December 2011.

== Home media ==
War Horse was released on Blu-ray Disc, DVD, and digital download by Touchstone Home Entertainment on 3 April 2012. The release was produced in three different physical packages: a four-disc combo pack (two-disc Blu-ray, DVD, and Digital Copy); a two-disc combo pack (Blu-ray and DVD); and a single-disc DVD. The film was released digitally through on-demand services such as the ITunes Store in high and standard definitions. The single-disc DVD includes the bonus feature War Horse: The Look, and the digital versions include "An Extra's Point of View"; the two-disc combo pack includes both bonus features. The four-disc combo pack comes with the same extras as the two-disc combo pack, as well as "A Filmmaking Journey", "Editing & Scoring", "The Sounds of War Horse", and "Through the Producer's Lens" bonus features.

== Reception ==
=== Box office ===
War Horse grossed $79,859,441 domestically and $97,200,000 internationally for a worldwide total of $177,584,879. Although it was not one of Spielberg's biggest box office successes, it was the highest-grossing World War I film of all time until Wonder Woman overtook it six years later.

=== Critical response ===
On Rotten Tomatoes, the film has an approval rating of 74% based on 241 reviews, with an average score of 7/10. The site's critical consensus reads, "Technically superb, proudly sentimental, and unabashedly old-fashioned, War Horse is an emotional drama that tugs the heartstrings with Spielberg's customary flair." Metacritic reports a score of 72/100 based on 40 critics, indicating "Generally favorable reviews". Audiences surveyed by CinemaScore gave the film an average grade of "A−" on an A+ to F scale.

Although there was an embargo on official reviews of the film being published before 21 December 2011, reviews started appearing on 26 November in mainstream press such as The Daily Telegraph, which gave it 4 1/2 out of 5 stars.

Giving the film an A− grade, Lisa Schwarzbaum of Entertainment Weekly wrote, "The project is tailor-made for Saving Private Ryan Spielberg, the war-story specialist, as well as for E.T. Spielberg, the chronicler of boyhood desires and yearnings for family." Rex Reed of The New York Observer gave the film 4 out of 4 stars and said, "War Horse is a don't-miss Spielberg classic that reaches true perfection. It's as good as movies can get, and one of the greatest triumphs of this or any other year." Roger Ebert gave the film 3.5 out of 4 stars, saying it contained "surely some of the best footage Spielberg has ever directed ... The film is made with superb artistry. Spielberg is the master of an awesome canvas. Most people will enjoy it, as I did." Richard Roeper praised War Horse by saying, "What a gorgeous, breathtaking, epic adventure this is," and gave the film 4.5 out of 5 stars. Ty Burr of The Boston Globe said that the film was a work of "full-throated Hollywood classicism" that looks back to the craftsmanship and sentimentality of John Ford and other legends of the studio era, and gave it 3 out of 4 stars.

Conversely, Simon Winder of The Guardian wrote that the film, "despite twisting and turning to be even-handed, simply could not help itself and, like some faux-reformed alcoholic, gorged itself on an entire miniature liqueur selection of Anglo-German clichés". David Denby of The New Yorker wrote that "The horses themselves are magnificent, and maybe that's reason enough to see the movie. But War Horse is a bland, bizarrely unimaginative piece of work".

== Accolades ==
War Horse made several critics' lists of the best films of 2011. Richard Corliss of Time named it the fifth best film of 2011, saying. "Boldly emotional, nakedly heartfelt, War Horse will leave only the stoniest hearts untouched". David Chen of /Film selected War Horse as 2011's best film.

Awards	Category	Name	Result	Ref.
Academy Awards	Best Picture	Steven Spielberg; Kathleen Kennedy	Nominated	
Academy Awards	Best Art Direction	Rick Carter; Lee Sandales	Nominated	
Academy Awards	Best Cinematography	Janusz Kamiński	Nominated	
Academy Awards	Best Original Score	John Williams	Nominated	
Academy Awards	Best Sound Editing	Richard Hymns; Gary Rydstrom	Nominated	
Academy Awards	Best Sound Mixing	Gary Rydstrom; Andy Nelson; Tom Johnson; Stuart Wilson	Nominated	
American Cinema Editors Awards	Best Edited Feature Film – Dramatic	Michael Kahn	Nominated	
American Film Institute Awards	Film of the Year 2011	War Horse	Won	
British Academy Film Awards	Best Film Music	John Williams	Nominated	
British Academy Film Awards	Best Cinematography	Janusz Kamiński	Nominated	
British Academy Film Awards	Best Production Design	Rick Carter; Lee Sandales	Nominated	
British Academy Film Awards	Best Sound	Stuart Wilson; Gary Rydstrom; Andy Nelson; Tom Johnson; Richard Hymns	Nominated	
British Academy Film Awards	Best Special Visual Effects	Ben Morris; Neil Corbould	Nominated	
BMI Film & TV Awards	Film Music Award	John Williams	Won	
Broadcast Film Critics Association Awards	Best Picture	War Horse	Nominated	
Broadcast Film Critics Association Awards	Best Director	Steven Spielberg	Nominated	
Broadcast Film Critics Association Awards	Best Cinematography	Janusz Kamiński	Won	
Broadcast Film Critics Association Awards	Best Art Direction	Rick Carter; Lee Sandales	Nominated	
Broadcast Film Critics Association Awards	Best Editing	Michael Kahn	Nominated	
Broadcast Film Critics Association Awards	Best Sound	War Horse	Nominated	
Broadcast Film Critics Association Awards	Best Score	John Williams	Nominated	
Chicago Film Critics Association Awards	Best Cinematography	Janusz Kamiński	Nominated	
Golden Globe Awards	Best Motion Picture – Drama	War Horse	Nominated	
Golden Globe Awards	Best Original Score	John Williams	Nominated	
Houston Film Critics Society Awards	Best Film	War Horse	Nominated	
Houston Film Critics Society Awards	Best Cinematography	Janusz Kamiński	Nominated	
Houston Film Critics Society Awards	Best Score	John Williams	Nominated	
London Film Critics' Circle Awards	British Actor of the Year	Peter Mullan	Nominated	
London Film Critics' Circle Awards	Young British Performer of the Year	Jeremy Irvine	Nominated	
Motion Picture Sound Editors Golden Reel Awards	Best Sound Editing: Sound Effects and Foley in a Feature Film	War Horse	Won	
Motion Picture Sound Editors Golden Reel Awards	Best Sound Editing: Dialogue and ADR in a Feature Film	War Horse	Nominated	
National Board of Review Awards	Best Film	War Horse	Nominated	
National Board of Review Awards	Top Ten Films	War Horse	Won	
Producers Guild of America Awards	Best Theatrical Motion Picture	Kathleen Kennedy; Steven Spielberg	Nominated	
Satellite Awards	Best Motion Picture	War Horse	Nominated	
Satellite Awards	Best Director	Steven Spielberg	Nominated	
Satellite Awards	Best Adapted Screenplay	Lee Hall; Richard Curtis	Nominated	
Satellite Awards	Best Original Score	John Williams	Nominated	
Satellite Awards	Best Cinematography	Janusz Kamiński	Won	
Satellite Awards	Best Visual Effects	Ben Morris	Nominated	
Satellite Awards	Best Film Editing	Michael Kahn	Nominated	
Satellite Awards	Best Sound (Editing & Mixing)	Andy Nelson; Gary Rydstrom; Richard Hymns; Stuart Wilson; Tom Johnson	Nominated	
Visual Effects Society Awards	Outstanding Supporting Visual Effects in a Feature Motion Picture	Annie Godin; Louis Morin	Nominated	
Washington D.C. Area Film Critics Association	Best Art Direction	Rick Carter; Lee Sandales	Nominated	
Washington D.C. Area Film Critics Association	Best Cinematography	Janusz Kamiński	Nominated	
Washington D.C. Area Film Critics Association	Best Score	John Williams	Nominated	

== See also ==
- Horses in World War I
- List of films about horses
- Au hasard Balthazar
- Second weekend in box office performance § Second-weekend increase
