= Pandolf equation =

Equation for estimating metabolic cost of load carriage

The Pandolf equation is an empirical equation for predicting the metabolic cost of load carriage and estimating energy expenditure while standing or walking slowly with an external load. It was published in 1977.

$M = 1.5W \;+\; 2.0(W + L)\left(\frac{L}{W}\right)^2 \;+\; \eta (W + L)\left(1.5V^2 + 0.35VG \right)$

In this equation, $M$ is the metabolic rate (in watts), $W$ is body mass (in kilograms), $L$ is the external load mass (in kilograms), $V$ is walking velocity (in meters per second), $G$ is the grade (percent slope), and $\eta$ is a dimensionless terrain factor accounting for surface conditions. The first term estimates standing metabolic cost without load, the second accounts for standing with a carried load, and the third is the velocity-dependent walking term.

Common values for the terrain factor $\eta$ include:

Terrain factor values
Surface	$\eta$
Blacktop road or treadmill	1.0
Dirt road	1.1
Light brush	1.2
Heavy brush	1.5
Swampy bog	1.8
Loose sand	2.1
Soft snow, 15 cm depth	2.5
Soft snow, 25 cm depth	3.3
Soft snow, 35 cm depth	4.1

== Applications ==
The Pandolf equation is used to estimate the energetic cost of walking while carrying loads, particularly in military contexts.

=== Limitations ===
The equation is known to underpredict the metabolic rate for higher loads and speeds, for soldiers wearing explosive ordnance disposal protective clothing, and prolonged periods. A correction factor has been proposed to account for the metabolic cost of downhill locomotion.

== See also ==
- Aerobic exercise
- Exercise physiology
- Loaded march
