= David Kenyon =

British archaeologist and military historian

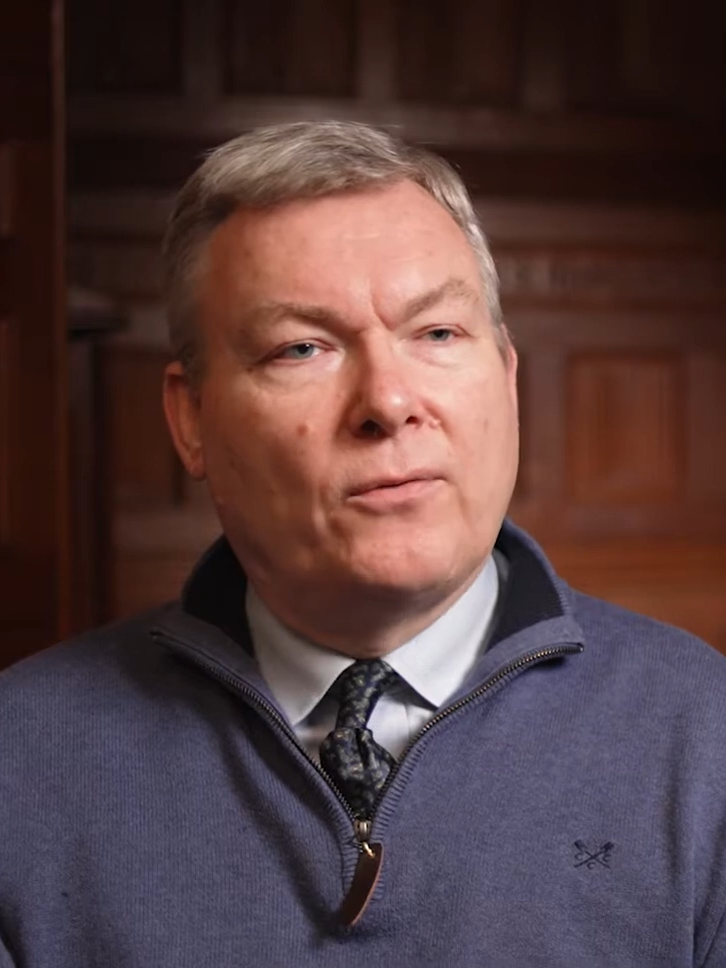
David Kenyon in 2022

David Kenyon is a British archaeologist and military historian. He was one of the military advisors on the film War Horse.

== Life ==
He is known for his work on presenting and interpreting World War I history at public events and in the media. Since 2015, he is the Research Historian at Bletchley Park. He is also an Associate Lecturer in History at Brunel University and an Honorary Research Fellow in the School of History at the University of Kent.

== Works ==
- Robertshaw, Andrew; Kenyon, David (2008), Digging the Trenches, Pen & Sword Books Ltd, ISBN 978-1473822887
- Kenyon, David (2011), Horsemen in No Man's Land: British Cavalry and Trench Warfare 1914-1918, Pen & Sword Military, ISBN 978-1848843646
- Kenyon, David (2019), Bletchley Park and D-Day: The Untold Story of How the Battle for Normandy Was Won, Yale University Press, ISBN 978-0-300-24357-4
