= Yomp =

Royal Marines slang

The Yomper shows Royal Marines heading to Stanley at the end of the Falklands War in June 1982.

Yomp is Royal Marines slang describing a long-distance loaded march carrying full kit. It was popularised by journalistic coverage in 1982 during the Falklands War. The origin of the word is unclear, and there is no evidence to suggest that it derives originally from an acronym. Various backronymic definitions have however been proposed, including "young officers marching pace", "your own marching pace" and a connection with the term yump used in rally-driving in the sense of "to leave the ground when taking a crest at speed", apparently a Scandinavian pronunciation of jump.

== Falklands War ==
The word and its meaning came to national prominence in the UK during the Falklands War in 1982. After disembarking from ships at San Carlos on East Falkland, on 21 May 1982, Royal Marines and members of the Parachute Regiment (Two Para) yomped with their equipment across the islands, covering 56 miles (90 km) in three days carrying 80-pound (36 kg) loads. They were supposed to be transported by helicopters, but after the Atlantic Conveyor, which carried the helicopters, was sunk by Argentinian Exocet missiles on 25 May, the soldiers had to march across the island.

=== Photograph ===
The image of Royal Marine Corporal Peter Robinson with a Union Jack fixed to his radio antenna became one of the most widely published of the Falklands War. Now known as The Yomper, it was taken by Petty Officer Peter Holdgate, Commando Forces Photographer, whilst working as part of the Commando Forces News Team. After landing with 40 Commando at San Carlos, Holdgate accompanied British forces across the Falklands War zone taking hundreds of photographs as the Royal Marines proceeded along the Moody Brook track towards Stanley.

When news of the surrender of Argentine forces was received, Marine Trev Gillingham produced a small Union bunting flag from his bergen, which he had acquired from SS Canberra's bunting locker. Marine Gillingham first tied the flag to Corporal Robinson's radio aerial, who was the last man in the patrol. It eventually blew off and was then fixed with masking tape to the radio aerial. The photograph itself was entirely spontaneous and not staged. The original Union Jack has been lost.

=== Memorial ===
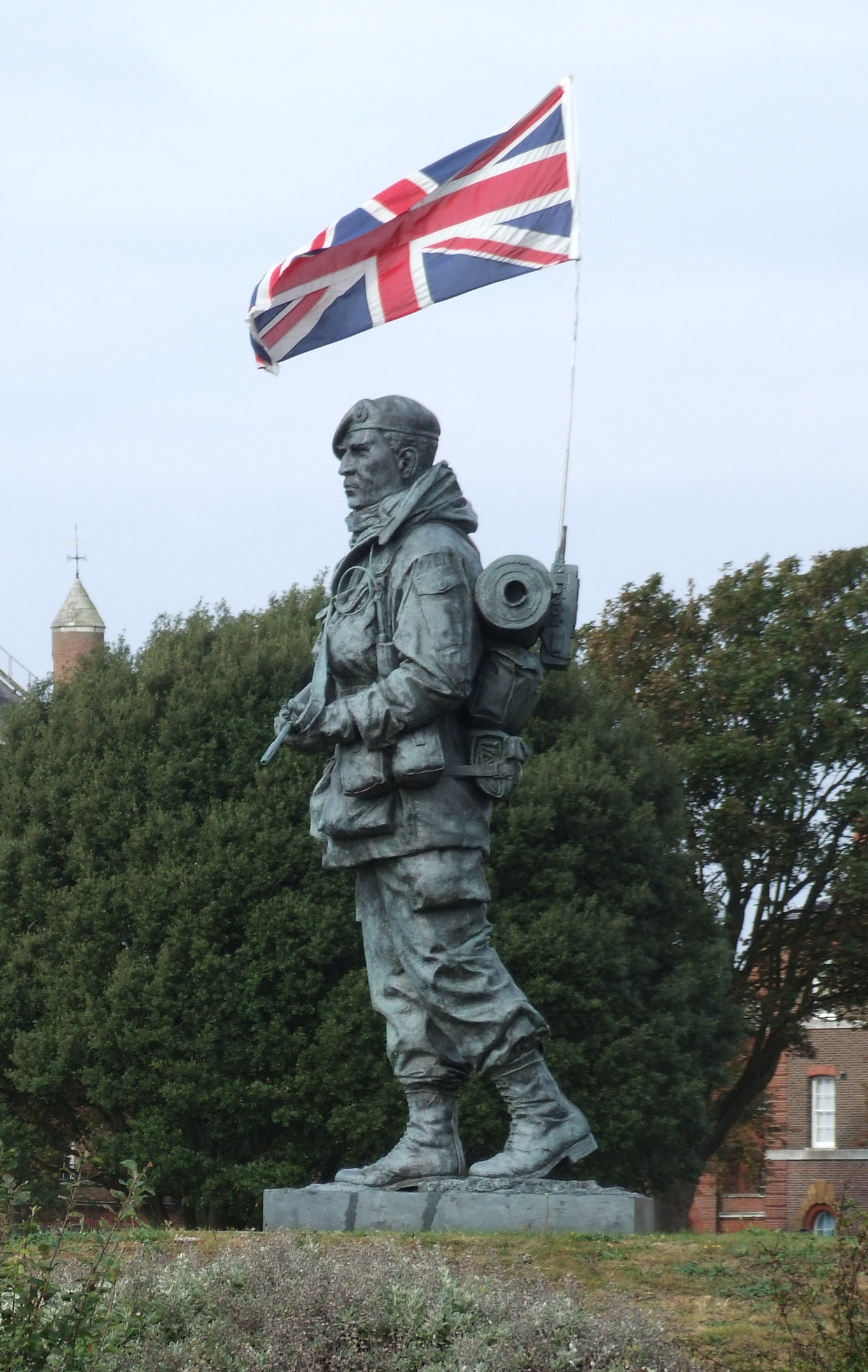
Memorial to "The Yomper" at the Royal Marines Museum in Eastney Esplanade, Portsmouth, UK

The image was used as the inspiration for a statue of Royal Marine Commando that was unveiled by Margaret Thatcher at the Royal Marines Museum in Southsea, Portsmouth on 8 July 1992 to mark the 10th anniversary of the conflict.

== Similar terms ==
British Army slang for the same marching conditions is "tab", while in United States military slang, the terms to "ruck" (from the "rucksack" being carried) or to "hump" (from the phrase "humping a pack") are used.

== See also ==
- Dartmoor Yomp
- Loaded march
