= Loaded march =

Relatively fast march over distance carrying a load

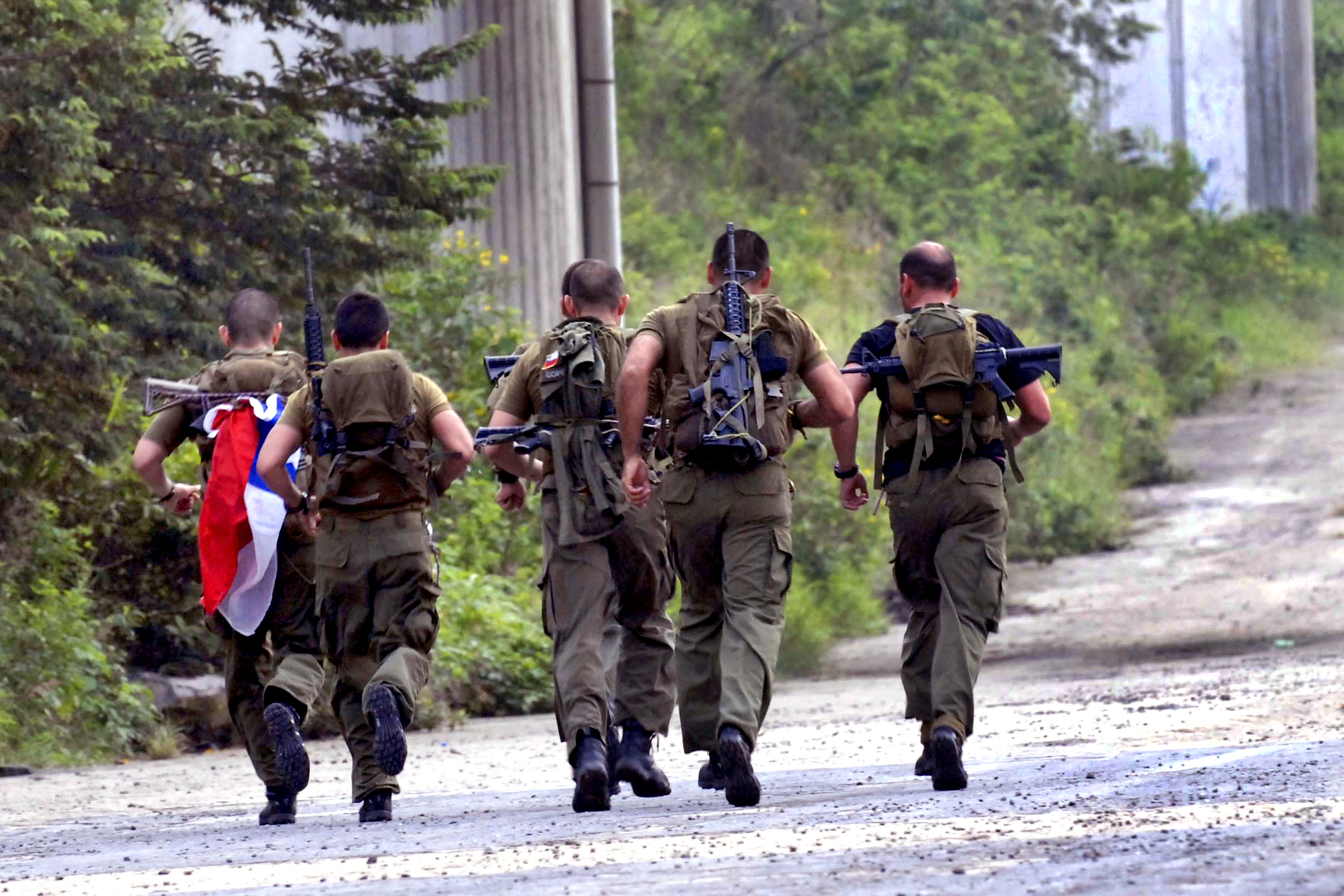
Chilean special operations team loaded march

A loaded march is a relatively fast march over distance while carrying a load; it is a common military exercise.

A loaded march is known as a forced foot march in the US Army. Less formally, it is called a ruck march or rucking in the Canadian Armed Forces and the US Army (in reference to carrying a rucksack), a tab in British Army slang, a yomp in Royal Marines slang, stomping in Australian Army slang, and a hump in the slang of the United States Marine Corps.

As a civilian exercise, loaded marching comes under the category of hiking, although this includes activities not vigorous enough to be compared to loaded marching. Civilian activities analogous to loaded marches are popular in New Zealand, where they are organised by "tramping clubs".

In many countries, the ability to complete loaded marches is a core military skill, especially for infantry and special forces. Loaded marching is particularly important in Britain, where all soldiers must complete annual loaded march tests.

In certain climates, the use of loaded marches is limited, since they would result in high casualty rates through heat exhaustion.

== In the Roman Army ==
According to Vegetius, during the four-month initial training of a Roman legionary, loaded marches were taught before recruits ever handled a weapon, since any formation would be split up by stragglers at the back or soldiers trundling along at differing speeds. Standards varied over time, but normally recruits were first required to complete 20 Roman miles (29.62 km or 18.405 modern miles) with 20.5 kg in five summer hours, which was known as "the regular step" or "military pace". (The Romans divided daylight time into twelve equal hours. Depending on the exact day of the year and the latitude, the length of a "summer hour" would vary. Five summer hours is therefore not exact, but could indicate a time of approximately six modern hours.) They then progressed to the "faster step" or "full pace" and were required to complete 24 Roman miles (35.544 km or 22.086 modern miles) in five summer hours loaded with 20.5 kilograms (45 lb). Training also included some forced marches of 20–30 miles, often followed by the construction of basic defences for an overnight position.

In some cases, each member of a Roman unit marched with a sudis, to aid the construction of defences.

== In the Belgian Land Component ==
In the Belgian Army, the Special Forces Group have two different tests. On the first test, known as "Bergham Run", the standard is to do 8km (4.97 miles) within 50 minutes, loaded with a 20kg rucksack. For the second test, the "Tender Feet", 120km (74 miles) must be walked within 48 hours, also with a 20kg rucksack.

== In the British Armed Forces ==
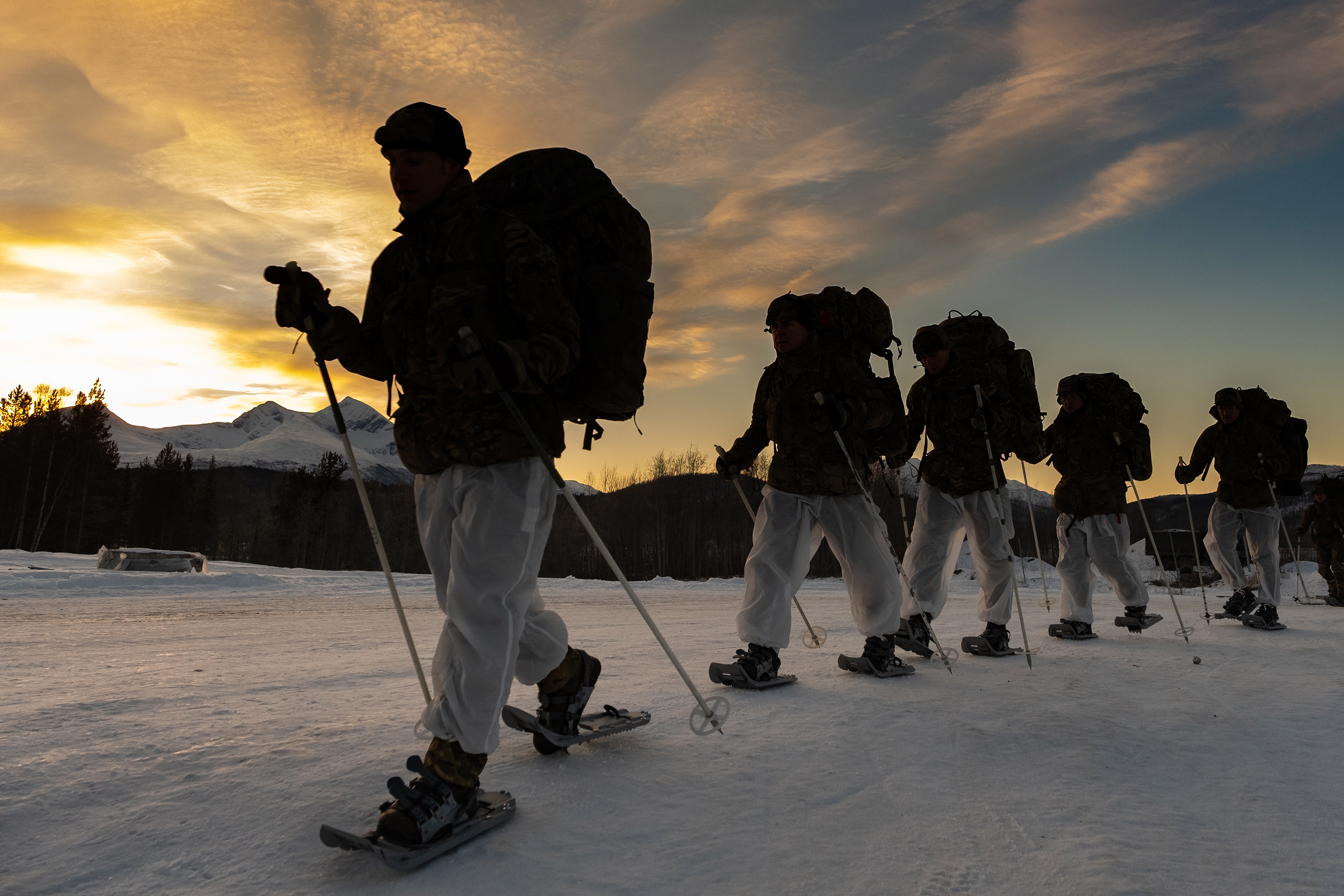
Royal Marine cold weather training in the Arctic

In the British Army, loaded marching is considered a core skill and is tested annually in a 12.9 kilometers (8 mi) Annual Fitness Test (formerly known as a Combat Fitness Test) carrying 15–25 kg depending on the arm (25 kg for infantry, 20 kg for artillery, armour/cavalry, and engineers/sappers; 15 kg for other arms and services). Infantry soldiers are additionally expected to complete advanced tests, typically a first day of 20 km (12.43 miles) with 30 kilograms (66 lb) in three and a half hours, followed by a similar march with 20 kilograms (44 lb) the next day. Within each arm there are more demanding units (such as close support, commandos and paratroopers) which have their own internal standards and tests. Special forces also use their own tests.

During the selection process, Army recruits are usually made to tab 3 kilometers (2 mi) as an introduction. This is because injuries to the legs are common during basic training tabbing.

Loaded marches have been particularly important in the British Army since the 1982 Falklands War. Many British commanders felt that British success in the war was linked to the British soldiers' ability to march across the difficult Falklands terrain with their kit. British infantry soldiers in Afghanistan conducted four-hour patrols carrying an average of 50 kilograms (110 lb) of equipment, going into battle with that weight if they encountered enemy fighters. There is some debate as to whether this makes them better equipped for battle or weighs them down too much.

Just as with its Royal Marine equivalent yomp, the origin of the term "tab" is entirely obscure, with various unproven definitions in circulation including that tab is an obsolete slang word for feet, or that it is the acronym for Tactical Advance to Battle.

== In the French Foreign Legion ==
To complete training and as part of an annual test of their fitness, legionnaires must complete the 8-kilometre TAP ("Paratroopers 8 kilometre") loaded with a rifle, helmet, and a 12-kilogram (26 lb) pack in under 40 minutes, and a night march of 25 kilometers (16 mi) in three hours with a load of 18 kilograms (40 lb). Various marches of much longer distances are also a part of training such as the "Kepi march" of 50 kilometers (31 mi) in full combat gear carrying a rifle, helmet and 22 kilograms (49 lb) load and the "Raid march" of 100 km in full combat gear carrying a rifle, helmet and 22 kilograms (49 lb) load simulating the navigation to and raiding of different checkpoints over a 3 day period. As part of the pre-selection for the Foreign Legion's GCP section, legionnaires must complete a 30 kilometers (19 mi) speed march in under 4 hours in full combat gear, including boots, carrying assault rifle, helmet, two full canteens of water and 22 kilograms (49 lb) load. The fastest time was recorded in 1995 by CCH G. Pelham in 2 hours 28 minutes. Until the 1990s legionnaires were punished by extra rocks added to backpacks, and shoulder straps replaced with wire.

== In the United States Armed Forces ==
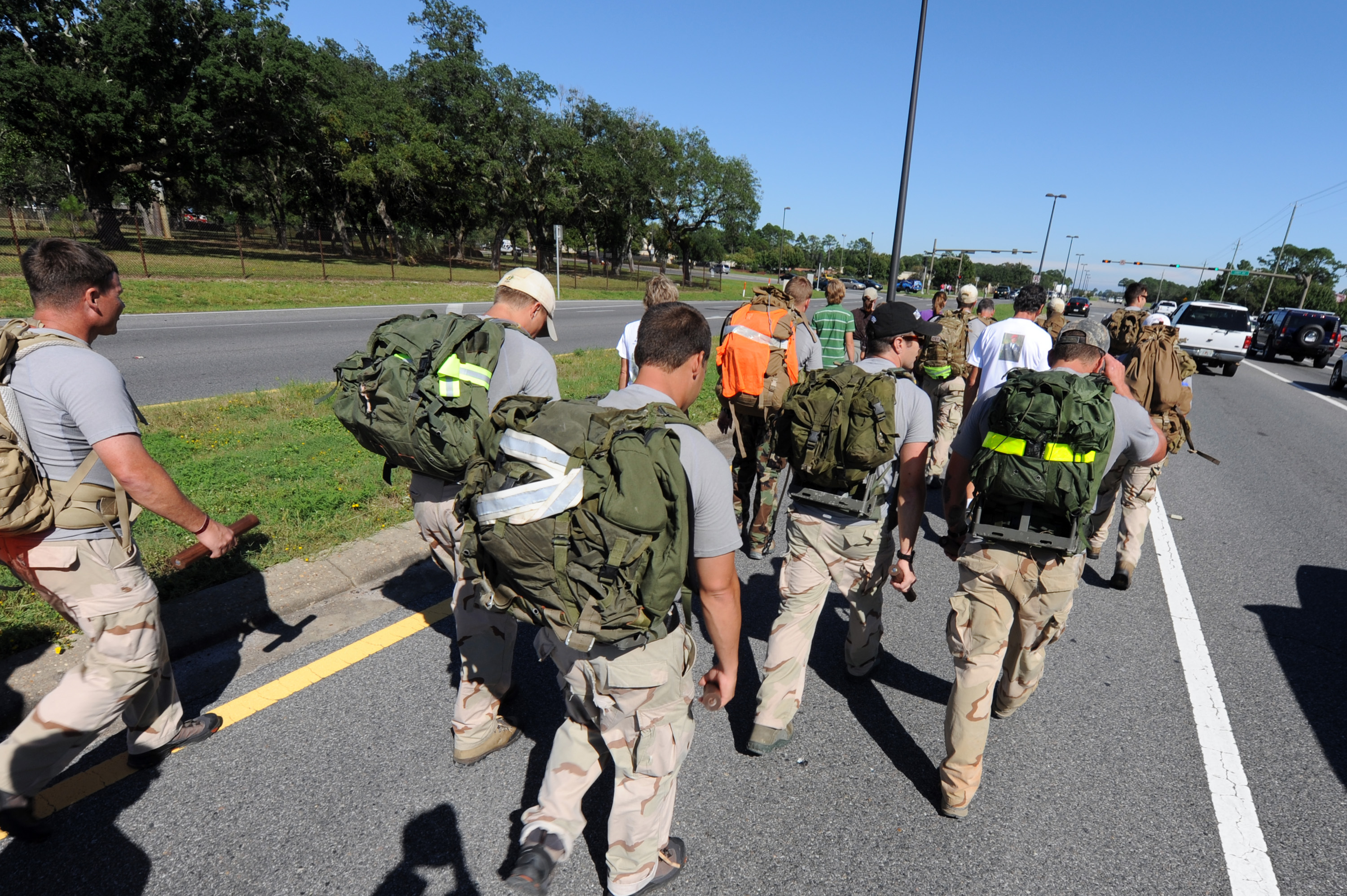
US Air Force loaded march in 2009

Loaded marches in the United States Army are known as ruck marches and are part of basic recruit training. In order to gain the Expert Infantryman Badge (a further qualification for existing infantry personnel), candidates must complete an individual ruck march of 19 kilometers (12 mi) within three hours, carrying a load (with rifle) weighing up to 31.75 kilograms (70 lb).

== See also ==
- Pandolf equation
- Rucksack palsy
