= List of Orange Is the New Black characters =

Orange Is the New Black is an American comedy-drama series created by Jenji Kohan that airs on Netflix. It is based on Piper Kerman's memoir, Orange Is the New Black: My Year in a Women's Prison, which chronicles her experiences in a women's prison. The series' protagonist is Piper Chapman, a woman sentenced to 15 months in a women's federal prison for her part in a drug smuggling operation. She was led into this situation by her ex-girlfriend Alex Vause who is first seen in one of the opening scenes, which takes place ten years before the start of the first season. The series follows Piper's experiences in and out of prison along with the experiences of a diverse ensemble.

== Overview ==
Actor	Character	Seasons						
Actor	Character	1	2	3	4	5	6	7
Main cast
Taylor Schilling	Piper Chapman	Main	Main	Main	Main	Main	Main	Main
Laura Prepon	Alex Vause	Main	Recurring	Main	Main	Main	Main	Main
Michael J. Harney	Sam Healy	Main	Main	Main	Main	Credit only (Note: Harney is credited as main cast in season five despite not appearing in any of the episodes.)	Guest	Guest
Michelle Hurst	Miss Claudette Pelage	Main						
Kate Mulgrew	Galina "Red" Reznikov	Main	Main	Main	Main	Main	Main	Main
Jason Biggs	Larry Bloom	Main	Main			Guest		Recurring
Uzo Aduba	Suzanne "Crazy Eyes" Warren	Recurring	Main	Main	Main	Main	Main	Main
Danielle Brooks	Tasha "Taystee" Jefferson	Recurring	Main	Main	Main	Main	Main	Main
Natasha Lyonne	Nicky Nichols	Recurring	Main	Main	Main	Main	Main	Main
Taryn Manning	Tiffany "Pennsatucky" Doggett	Recurring	Main	Main	Main	Main	Main	Main
Selenis Leyva	Gloria Mendoza	Recurring	Recurring	Main	Main	Main	Main	Main
Adrienne C. Moore	Cindy "Black Cindy" Hayes	Recurring	Recurring	Main	Main	Main	Main	Main
Dascha Polanco	Dayanara "Daya" Diaz	Recurring	Recurring	Main	Main	Main	Main	Main
Nick Sandow	Joe Caputo	Recurring	Recurring	Main	Main	Main	Main	Main
Yael Stone	Lorna Morello	Recurring	Recurring	Main	Main	Main	Main	Main
Samira Wiley	Poussey Washington	Recurring	Recurring	Main	Main	Guest		Guest
Jackie Cruz	Marisol "Flaca" Gonzales	Recurring	Recurring	Recurring	Main	Main	Main	Main
Lea DeLaria	Carrie "Big Boo" Black	Recurring	Recurring	Recurring	Main	Main	Guest	Guest
Elizabeth Rodriguez	Aleida Diaz	Recurring	Recurring	Recurring	Main (Note: Rodriguez is promoted to the main cast in the seventh episode of season four. In all prior appearances in season four, she is credited as a guest star.)	Main	Main	Main
Jessica Pimentel	Maria Ruiz	Recurring	Recurring	Recurring	Recurring	Main	Main	Main
Laura Gómez	Blanca Flores	Recurring	Recurring	Recurring	Recurring	Recurring	Main	Main
Matt Peters	Joel Luschek	Recurring	Recurring	Recurring	Recurring	Recurring	Main	Main
Dale Soules	Frieda Berlin		Recurring	Recurring	Recurring	Recurring	Main	Main
Alysia Reiner	Natalie "Fig" Figueroa	Recurring	Recurring	Recurring	Guest	Recurring	Recurring	Main
Recurring cast
Laverne Cox	Sophia Burset	Recurring	Recurring	Recurring	Recurring	Recurring	Recurring	Guest
Diane Guerrero	Maritza Ramos	Recurring	Recurring	Recurring	Recurring	Recurring		Recurring
Vicky Jeudy	Janae Watson	Recurring	Recurring	Recurring	Recurring	Recurring		Guest
Annie Golden	Norma Romano	Recurring	Recurring	Recurring	Recurring	Recurring		Guest
Emma Myles	Leanne Taylor	Recurring	Recurring	Recurring	Recurring	Recurring		Guest
Julie Lake	Angie Rice	Recurring	Recurring	Recurring	Recurring	Recurring		Guest
Abigail Savage	Gina Murphy	Recurring	Recurring	Recurring	Recurring	Recurring		Guest
Constance Shulman	Erica "Yoga" Jones	Recurring	Recurring	Recurring	Recurring	Recurring		Guest
Lori Tan Chinn	Mei Chang	Recurring	Recurring	Recurring	Recurring	Recurring		Guest
Tamara Torres	Emily Germann	Recurring	Recurring	Recurring	Recurring	Recurring		Guest
Lin Tucci	Anita DeMarco	Recurring	Recurring	Recurring	Recurring	Recurring		Guest
Tanya Wright	Crystal Burset	Recurring	Recurring	Recurring	Recurring		Guest	
Beth Fowler	Sister Jane Ingalls	Recurring	Recurring	Recurring	Recurring			
Catherine Curtin	Wanda Bell	Recurring	Recurring	Recurring	Guest	Guest		Recurring
Joel Marsh Garland	Scott O'Neill	Recurring	Recurring	Recurring	Guest	Guest		Recurring
Michael Chernus	Cal Chapman	Recurring	Recurring	Recurring	Guest		Guest	Recurring
Brendan Burke	Wade Donaldson	Recurring	Recurring	Recurring	Guest			
Deborah Rush	Carol Chapman	Recurring	Recurring	Recurring		Recurring		Guest
Berto Colon	Cesar Velazquez	Recurring	Recurring	Recurring		Guest		Recurring
Tracee Chimo	Neri Feldman	Recurring	Recurring	Recurring				Recurring
Matt McGorry	John Bennett	Recurring	Recurring	Recurring				
Lolita Foster	Elique Maxwell	Recurring	Recurring	Recurring				
Pablo Schreiber	George "Pornstache" Mendez	Recurring	Recurring	Guest		Guest		Guest
Barbara Rosenblat	Rosa "Miss Rosa" Cisneros	Recurring	Recurring	Guest				
Maria Dizzia	Polly Harper	Recurring	Recurring					Recurring
Lauren Lapkus	Susan Fischer	Recurring	Recurring					Guest
Nick Stevenson	Pete Harper	Recurring	Recurring					
Kaipo Schwab	Igme Dimaguiba	Recurring	Guest	Guest	Recurring			
Madeline Brewer	Tricia Miller	Recurring						
Kimiko Glenn	Brook Soso		Recurring	Recurring	Recurring	Recurring		Guest
Ian Paola	Yadriel		Recurring	Recurring	Guest	Recurring		Recurring
Germar Terrell Gardner	Charles Ford		Recurring	Recurring				
Hamilton Clancy	Kowalski		Recurring	Recurring				
Yvette Freeman	Irma Lerman		Recurring	Guest				
Judith Roberts	Erica Taslitz		Recurring		Guest			Guest
Lorraine Toussaint	Yvonne "Vee" Parker		Recurring					
Patricia Squire	Jimmy Cavanaugh		Recurring					
James McMenamin	Charlie "Donuts" Coates			Recurring	Recurring	Recurring	Recurring	
Karina Ortiz	Margarita			Recurring	Recurring	Recurring	Recurring	
Michael Bryan French	Jack Pearson			Recurring	Recurring	Recurring	Guest	
John Magaro	Vince Muccio			Recurring	Recurring	Recurring		Recurring
Blair Brown	Judy King			Recurring	Recurring	Recurring		Guest
Alan Aisenberg	Baxter "Gerber" Bayley			Recurring	Recurring	Recurring		
Emily Althaus	Maureen Kukudio			Recurring	Recurring	Recurring		
Jimmy Gary Jr.	Felix Rikerson			Recurring	Recurring	Guest		
Lori Petty	Lolly Whitehill		Guest	Recurring	Recurring		Recurring	Recurring
Mike Birbiglia	Danny Pearson			Recurring	Recurring			
Mugga	Reema Pell			Recurring	Guest	Recurring		
Ruby Rose	Stella Carlin			Recurring	Guest			
Eden Malyn	Erin Sikowitz			Recurring	Guest			
Jamie Denbo	Shelly Ginsberg		Guest	Recurring		Recurring		
Danielle Herbert	Jeanie "Babs" Babson			Recurring		Recurring		
Mary Steenburgen	Delia Mendez-Powell			Recurring		Guest		
Patricia Kalember	Marka Nichols	Guest		Recurring			Guest	
Marsha Stephanie Blake	Berdie Rogers			Recurring				
Beth Dover	Linda Ferguson			Guest	Recurring	Recurring	Recurring	Recurring
Daniella De Jesus	Irene "Zirconia" Cabrera				Recurring	Recurring	Recurring	Recurring
Shannon Esper	Alana Dwight				Recurring	Recurring	Recurring	Recurring
Emily Tarver	Artesian McCullough				Recurring	Recurring	Recurring	Recurring
Mike Houston	Lee Dixon				Recurring	Recurring	Recurring	Recurring
Nick Dillenburg	Ryder Blake				Recurring	Recurring	Recurring	Recurring
Rosal Colon	Carmen "Ouija" Aziza				Recurring	Recurring	Guest	
Francesca Curran	Helen "Skinhead Helen" Van Maele				Recurring	Recurring	Guest	
Brad William Henke	Desi Piscatella				Recurring	Recurring	Guest	
Amanda Stephen	Alison Abdullah				Recurring	Recurring		Guest
Kelly Kabarcz	Kasey Sankey				Recurring	Recurring		Guest
Olivia Luccardi	Jennifer Digori		Guest		Recurring	Recurring		
Asia Kate Dillon	Brandy Epps				Recurring	Recurring		
Evan Hall	B. Stratman				Recurring	Recurring		
Miriam Morales	Ramona "Pidge" Contreras				Recurring	Recurring		
Jolene Purdy	Stephanie Hapakuka				Recurring	Recurring		
Arianda Fernandez	Michelle Carreras				Recurring	Recurring		
Michael Torpey	Thomas Humphrey				Recurring	Recurring		
Hunter Emery	Rick Hopper					Recurring	Recurring	Recurring
Mary Boyer	Pat Warren	Guest	Guest			Recurring	Guest	Guest
Anita Keal	Elsie					Recurring	Guest	
Richard Masur	Bill Montgomery			Guest	Guest	Recurring		
John Palladino	Josh				Guest	Recurring		
Gerrard Lobo	Adarsh					Recurring		
Gita Reddy	Nita Reddy					Recurring		
David Roberts	D. Davis					Recurring		
Miguel Izaguirre	Diablo Zuniga	Guest			Guest	Guest	Recurring	Recurring
Shirley Roeca	Juanita Vazquez					Guest	Recurring	Recurring
Shawna Hamic	Virginia "Ginger" Copeland						Recurring	Recurring
Nicholas Webber	Alvarez						Recurring	Recurring
Susan Heyward	Tamika Ward						Recurring	Recurring
Josh Segarra	Stefanovic						Recurring	Recurring
Branden Wellington	Jarod Young						Recurring	Recurring
Greg Vrotsos	Hellman						Recurring	Recurring
Amanda Fuller	Madison "Badison" Murphy						Recurring	Recurring
Finnerty Steeves	Beth Hoefler						Recurring	Recurring
Besanya Santiago	Raquel "Creech" Munoz						Recurring	Recurring
Christina Toth	Annalisa Damiva						Recurring	Recurring
Phumzile Sitole	Antoinetta "Akers" Kerson						Recurring	Recurring
Alice Kremelberg	Nicole Eckelcamp						Recurring	Recurring
Reema Sampat	Shruti Chambal						Recurring	Recurring
Sipiwe Moyo	Adeola Chinede						Recurring	Recurring
Rebecca Knox	Tina Swope						Recurring	Recurring
Dana Berger	Crystal Tawney						Recurring	Recurring
Mandela Bellamy	Rosalie Deitland						Recurring	Recurring
Marcia DeBonis	Cathy						Recurring	Recurring
Jo Lampert	Marie Brock						Recurring	Recurring
Alexander Wraith	Vasily Reznikov		Guest	Guest			Recurring	Guest
Vicci Martinez	Dominga "Daddy" Duarte						Recurring	Guest
Kana Hatakeyama	Charlene Teng						Recurring	Guest
Nedra McClyde	Sylvia Guillen						Recurring	Guest
Jason Altman	Herrmann					Guest	Recurring	
Henny Russell	Carol Denning						Recurring	
Mackenzie Phillips	Barbara "Barb" Denning						Recurring	
Bill Hoag	Bill Chapman	Guest	Guest	Guest				Recurring
Karina Arroyave	Karla Córdova							Recurring
Marie Lou-Nahhas	Shani Abboud							Recurring
Alysia Joy Powell	Wyndolyn Capers							Recurring
Alicia Witt	Zelda							Recurring
Adam Lindo	Carlos "Clitvack" Litvack							Recurring
Ismenia Mendes	Tali Grapes							Recurring
Melinna Bobadilla	Santos Chaj							Recurring
Mike Cabellon	Elmer Fantauzzo							Recurring

== Main characters ==
=== Piper Chapman ===
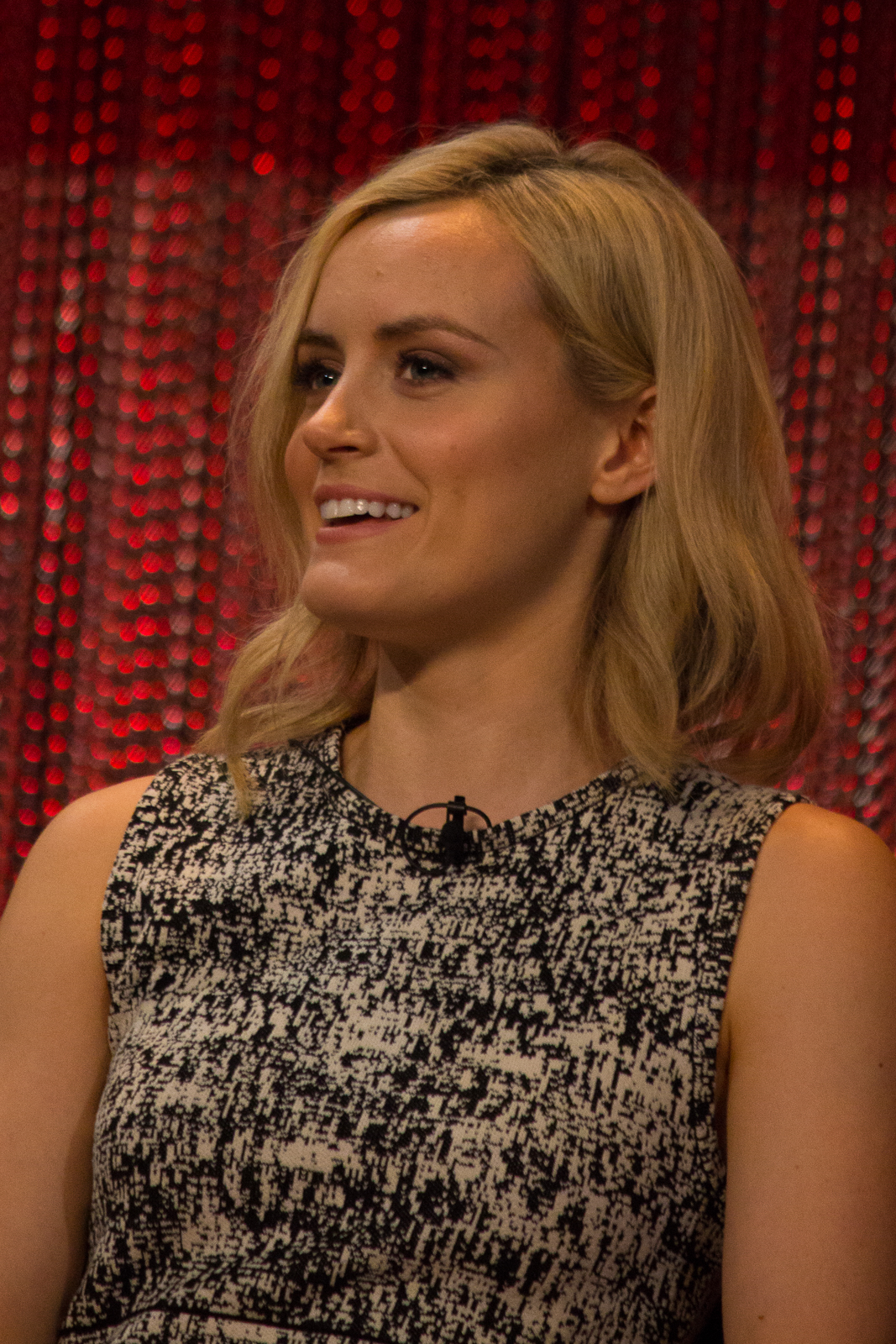
Taylor Schilling

Piper Chapman (played by Taylor Schilling) is a woman who was sentenced to 15 months in Litchfield Penitentiary, a fictitious prison in Litchfield, New York, for helping her former girlfriend, Alex Vause, smuggle drug money in Europe several years before the first episode.

==== Season One ====
The first season shows Piper's journey through the prison system, beginning with her first week, during which she accidentally makes several enemies and struggles to adapt to life on the inside, as well as reuniting with Alex. In prison, she acquires several nicknames throughout the series. A fellow inmate, "Crazy Eyes", calls her "Dandelion" because she is tall and blonde, "Pennsatucky" refers to her as "College", and Tricia refers to her as "Brain", because she is more educated than most of the inmates. Piper is assigned a bunk with Claudette, who treats her rudely at first, but eventually warms up to her. Piper is also assigned to the Women's Advisory Council (WAC), despite not running and asking Healy not to place her on the council. She works in the electrical shop at the prison and inadvertently takes a screwdriver from the tool crib and loses it. Her ambiguous sexuality is a source of amusement to her best friend Polly and of frustration to her fiancé Larry. She is initially considered non-threatening by most of the other inmates. She is often accused of being profoundly self-obsessed. She becomes enemies with Tiffany after she ridiculed her religious beliefs, and ended up beating her severely after a failed attempt on her life at the end of the first season, knocking out all of her teeth.

==== Season Two ====
In the second season, she is flown to Chicago, Illinois to testify at the trial of Alex's former boss, Kubra Balik. After perjuring herself at the recommendation of Alex, Piper is returned to Litchfield to serve the remainder of her sentence while Alex is released on early parole for her testimony. After learning her grandmother is dying, Healy assists her in getting furlough to visit her, and then to attend the funeral, which aggravates some of the other inmates. She is also commissioned by a journalist and friend of Larry's to secretly investigate the prison's books and later collaborates with a guard, Joe Caputo, to expose Figueroa's corruption, preventing Piper from being transferred to a prison in Virginia. She ends up breaking up with Larry, and after discovering that he and her friend Polly are having an affair, she asks them to report Alex to her probation officer.

==== Season Three ====
In the third season, Piper admits to Alex that she was the one that alerted her probation officer that she violated her parole, causing her to be sent back to prison. Piper ends up getting selected for a new work detail creating underwear for Whispers, a lingerie company. After being rebuffed on her attempt to show the company that they were wasting fabric and could make an extra pair of underwear with each sheet, she uses the extra fabric to start a used panty business with her brother Cal, recruits some of the other inmates to wear the panties, and uses Officer Bayley to smuggle the panties out of the prison. At first, she pays the women wearing the panties with ramen noodle seasoning packets but is forced to give them money after Flaca threatens to cause a strike. However, as her business begins to succeed, she becomes darker and more ruthless, firing Flaca in retaliation for her instigation of the strike. This change in Piper's personality, as well as Alex's paranoia, leads to the end of their relationship, and Piper starts a relationship with new inmate Stella Carlin and allowed her to tattoo the words "Trust No Bitch" on her arm. At the end of the third season, Piper discovers that Stella stole her money from her panty business to use as a financial cushion on the outside due to her pending release. Piper at first pretends to forgive her and allows her to keep the money, but later plants several contraband items (including a shiv and some marijuana) in her area and arranges for them to be discovered, causing Stella to be moved to maximum security, while facing an extended sentence. She uses this incident as a warning to the other inmates that may try to cross her.

==== Season Four ====
In the fourth season, Piper has allowed the incident with Stella to go to her head, and she has become arrogant and overconfident, hiring her new bunkmate Stephanie Hapakuka as muscle. As a result, when Maria Ruiz tries to persuade Piper to recruit some of her new Dominican friends into her business, Piper is rude to her. Angered, Maria starts a rival business that quickly outperforms Piper's. Faced with the loss of her business, Piper convinces the new guard captain Piscatella to let her start an anti-gang task force, but the women that gather at her meeting mistakenly assume that she wants to start a white supremacist group. During a meeting with one of the COs, the women bring the used panty businesses to his attention (after Piper tried to downplay it), resulting in Maria being caught and Piscatella stating that he would recommend that Maria gets three to five years added to her sentence. Despite her disgust with the white supremacist gang, she hangs out with them for protection from Maria's gang, but she is still kidnapped by Maria and branded with a swastika. She shows Red the brand while crying on her bed and later shows Nicky and Alex while smoking crack cocaine in the garden. While high, Piper discovers that Kubra sent Aydin to kill Alex and she killed him after he failed. Later, she was able to get her swastika altered into a window, with the help of Red, Norma, and Alex, and she apologizes to Alex for not believing her during the branding. After the incident, she and Alex start having sex again. Piper tries to convince Piscatella to stop the increasingly draconian treatment of the other inmates by the guards, and when he refuses, she joins the protest to include standing next to Blanca Flores on the cafeteria table. When Aydin's remains are found, she tries to prevent Alex from confessing to Aydin's murder. After Bayley accidentally kills Poussey, she runs into him in the hall while he is trying to go to Poussey's friends to apologize. She tells him to let them grieve and that she will let them know he is sorry in order to prevent him from going to their cell block. At the end of the season, she discovers that Alex has written several notes with Aydin's full name on it and spread it around the prison. She convinces her to gather them up so that they can burn them, but shortly after they throw them into a garbage can and set them on fire, women participating in the riot kick over the can, spreading the papers all over the floor.

==== Season Five ====
In the fifth season, when the riot breaks out, Piper and Alex find Linda Ferguson taking shelter in the bathroom and, after initially attempting to take her hostage, disguise her as an inmate so that she is not subjected to the same brutal treatment as the other hostages. She and Alex then organize the inmates not participating in the riot into a single party, which stays out in the yard away from the action. However, she is pulled into the riot herself after discovering who Linda is by looking through her phone and then using it to film the inmates burning their peace offering. Later on, she and Alex are kidnapped by Piscatella, and she – along with the rest of the group – is subjected to his emotional torture methods. After being rescued, and whilst hiding in Frieda's bunker, Piper proposes to Alex, and she accepts. However, shortly after, the bunker is stormed by the CERT officers.

==== Season Six ====
In the sixth season, Piper is being held in Max and has not seen Alex for days. She desperately tries to find out what happened to her, though she receives no information. Inmate Madison Murphy "assists" in getting Piper sent to medical to look for her by tripping her up, causing her tooth to chip, but Alex is not there. When Red attempts to get the message to her group that Piscatella was killed after he was released, Piper misunderstands the message, thinking that it was Alex who died, which is strengthened when she learns that one inmate died in the riot. Believing that Red's actions got Alex killed, she names her as an instigator, causing ten years to be added to her sentence. After being moved to Block C, Piper is forced to bunk with Madison, who tries to boss her around, despite her grieving, depressed state. Piper is thus caught off guard when Alex turns out to be alive, merely having sustained a broken arm in the raid, and they have a happy reunion. Alex then helps Piper by persuading Madison to leave her alone. Wanting to make her final months more bearable, Piper lobbies Luschek to reintroduce the Max kickball tournament, and eventually receives assistance from Block C's gang leader, Carol Denning. Madison initially muscles in to be captain for the team, but they eventually vote for Piper to take over, which incites Madison's jealousy. She responds by trying to have Piper's sentence extended by two years by planting drugs on her. Although Alex disagrees with Piper's planned approach to the problem, to just tell the guards, it actually ends up being successful: when Madison is eventually scared off, she is unable to prevent CO Hellman from handing a report about a drug infraction from Piper to his superior, CO Rick Hopper. However, because Piper chose to tell Hopper in advance what Madison was doing, he destroyed the report, and instead had Piper put forward for early release, fearing she would expose the drug smuggling operation he was assisting with. Before leaving, Nicky and Lorna organize a surprise wedding for her, so that she and Alex can be married before she leaves. She is finally released from prison and collected by Cal.

After Piper is released from prison, she moves in with Cal and his wife Neri, and she has to frequently check in with her probation officer Wyndolyn Capers. She was able to get a job working at a Thai restaurant but is fired after requesting time off to visit Alex. After being told by Wyndolyn that babysitting her niece is not sufficient to satisfy the employment requirement of her probation she is able to convince her father to hire her. She is almost sent back to prison for a parole violation when she ate a "Bloob," which contained marijuana at the behest of Cal and she later failed a drug test. Instead, Wyndolyn sends her to Narcotics Anonymous. Later in the season, she goes on a forest retreat and meets Zelda, who she eventually starts dating after an unexpected visit from her former CO McCollough convinces her not to continue staying faithful to Alex. She is also in contact with her former fiancé Larry and learns that he got Polly pregnant. Near the end of the series, Zelda tries to convince her to go with her on a consulting trip to Northhampton and her father strongly endorses Zelda's request. After getting advice from Larry she decides to decline Zelda's request and instead continue her relationship with Alex. In order to continue seeing Alex when she got transferred to a prison in Ohio she quit her job at her father's company in favor of moving closer to Alex's prison, getting a new job at Starbucks, and taking a civil procedure law class.

=== Alex Vause ===
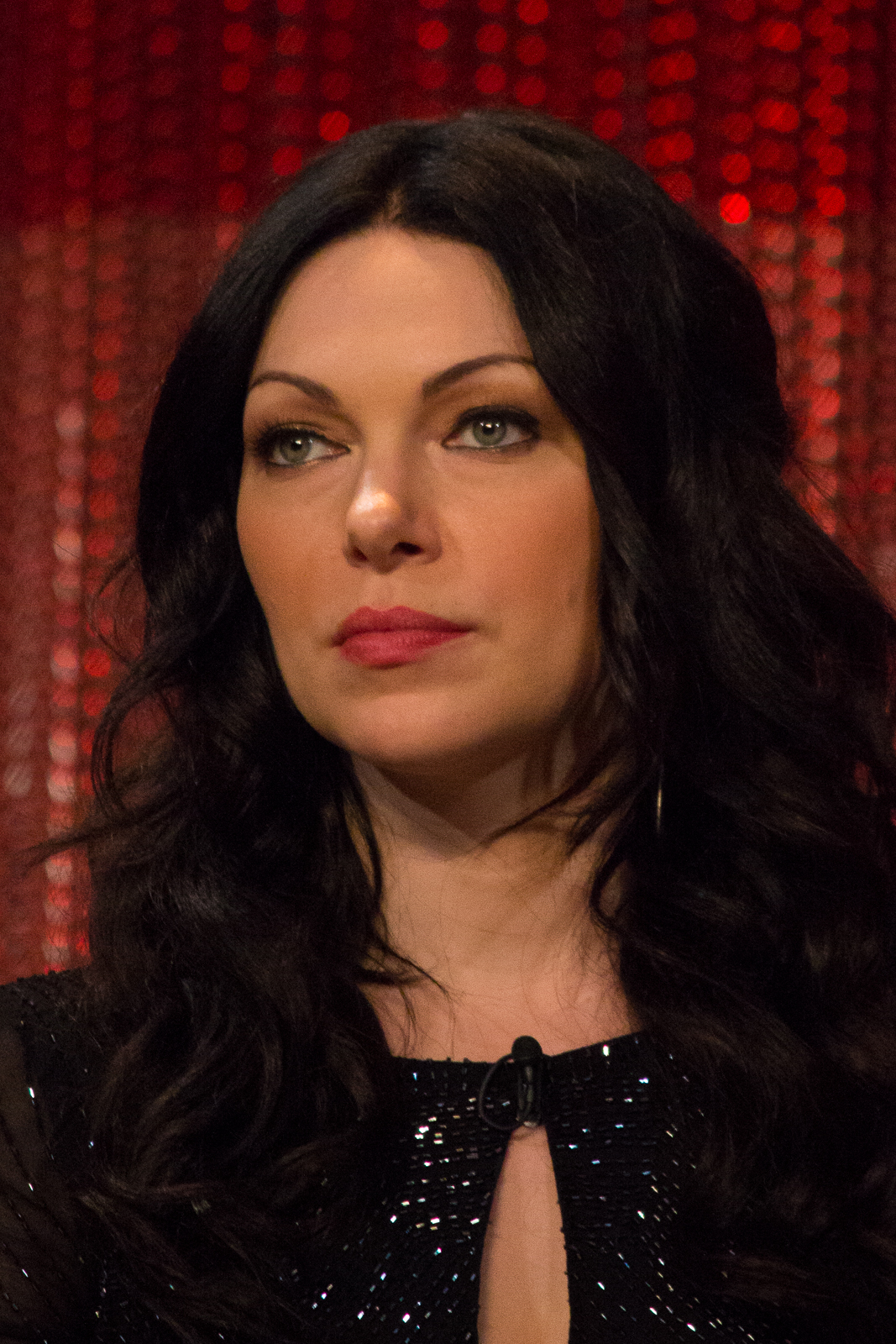
Laura Prepon

Alex Vause (played by Laura Prepon) – Alex is a former drug smuggler for an unspecified international drug cartel. Years prior to the beginning of the series, she took a sexual interest in Piper after meeting her in a bar, and gradually integrated her into the drug trade while they traveled the world living in luxury. Alex once convinced Piper to smuggle cash through customs at an airport in Europe, the crime for which Piper is doing time. Alex specifically named Piper during her testimony, which is what led to Piper's later arrest. After Piper broke up with her, Alex began using heroin, but cleaned up in rehab paid by the head of her drug ring. She states during an Alcoholics Anonymous meeting that being in prison is her "rock bottom" experience. Alex's mother had worked four jobs, and her father was a washed-up rock star. Alex tracked down her father and struck up a friendship with his drug dealer who subsequently became her industry contact in a drug cartel. Alex is not particularly broken up about being in prison since she at least managed to free herself from her drug addiction. She admits to Piper and Nicky that she is not sure what she will do with her life when she gets out, as her only life skill is "moving massive amounts of heroin." She appears to have moments of depression, telling Nicky that she can no longer "get past the swirling darkness in her brain long enough to land on anything," and mentioning to Piper that upon entering prison, she was on anti-depressants, which she now trades for black eyeliner.

Alex is good at reading people and is perceptive, quite often surmising Piper's true feelings and intentions. During the second season, she double-crosses Piper and gives incriminating evidence at the trial of her former boss Kubra (after advising Piper to lie), earning herself an early release. When Piper calls her on the phone, she reveals that Kubra had walked free, and she is now in fear for her life. To Piper's dismay, when Alex visits, she reveals that she is planning to skip town and go into hiding. Alex ends up violating her parole when she pulls a gun on her landlord while he was letting her parole officer in her apartment, mistakenly assuming that he may have been one of Kubra's hitmen breaking in to kill her. This was a result of Piper secretly asking Polly to tip off Alex's probation officer so she could be returned to prison. In the third season, she returns to Litchfield, and despite finding out that Piper was the reason she was arrested, she restarts their relationship. This is short-lived, as the two break up again when Piper starts dating Stella. Alex becomes suspicious when Lolly Whitehall, a new inmate originally seen in Chicago, comes to the prison and she assumes that Kubra sent Lolly to kill her. Confronting Lolly in the bathroom, the two fight, and while choking Lolly, Alex discovers that she is just a paranoid prisoner that thinks the NSA is watching her. Alex ends up convincing Lolly that she is an undercover agent with the CIA in order to keep her from reporting their confrontation.

At the end of the third season, one of Kubra's enforcers, Aydin Bayat, confronts Alex in the greenhouse, ready to kill her. At the beginning of the fourth season, Lolly returns to find Aydin garroting Alex with his belt. Instinctively, Lolly storms in, pushes him off of her, and stomps him until he is unconscious and presumed dead. Later that night, Alex finds Aydin still breathing, and smothers him to death before dismembering his body and disposing of his remains in the prison garden the following morning with Lolly and Frieda. She is concerned with Lolly's actions when she continues to insist that Aydin was a government agent, but she prevents Frieda from killing Lolly to silence her. Alex becomes consumed with guilt for killing Aydin, and tells Red about it. When Nicky returns from max, Alex declines a proposition for sex with her but ends up smoking crack with her and Piper in the garden. While they were high, Piper shows her the swastika brand on her arm, and Alex tells Piper and Nicky that she killed Aydin. She helps Red and Norma turn Piper's brand into a window, while Piper apologized to her for ignoring her concerns about Kubra trying to kill her. After joking with Piper about who would give Bayley a handjob in exchange for burgers, the two once again rekindle their relationship. When Aydin's remains are found, Alex expresses disappointment that he may not be identifiable. She attempts to confess to Piscatella, but is prevented from doing so after Healy turns Lolly in for Aydin's death. Alex starts spreading notes around the prison identifying Aydin; after Piper discovers her planting a note in the garden, she tells Alex to gather the notes so she is not implicated. At the end of the season, Alex and Piper attempt to burn the notes in a garbage can, but after they light up the notes, inmates participating in the riot kick over the garbage can, spreading the notes all over the floor, although the notes are not discovered due to the riot.

In the fifth season, Alex and Piper help MCC executive Linda Ferguson avoid being taken hostage by the rioters by disguising her as a prisoner. She then joins Piper in organizing a non-participation movement in the exercise yard. Later, she and Piper are kidnapped by Piscatella, and bear witness to his torture of Red. During the torture, Piscatella brutally breaks Alex's arm, not knowing that the incident was secretly filmed by Gina, one of Red's girls, and uploaded to the internet. Whilst hiding in the bunker, Piper proposes to Alex, and she joyfully accepts. The bunker is then stormed by the CERT officers.

In the sixth season, Alex is absent for several episodes, having last been seen being dragged lifelessly out of the bunker by the CERT officers. However, it later emerges that the officer that had discovered her had, in fact, knocked her unconscious, and she was later taken to the hospital to get treatment for her arm. Upon her return, she reveals herself to a shocked and hugely relieved Piper, who had believed she was dead due to a misunderstanding of a message from Red, and the news that an inmate had died during the riot (whom Alex reveals was actually Maureen Kukudio, whose wounds had become infected). The two are happily reunited, and Alex helps Piper deal with Madison Murphy, her bullying bunkmate. Wanting to straighten out after her release from prison, Alex makes an application to business school. However, she finds herself being drawn into Madison's new operation, which she eventually has to join full-time after Madison starts threatening Piper's leaving date, becoming a right-hand woman for Carol Denning, Block D's gang boss, by impressing her with her prior career in the drug trade. She is genuinely thrilled when she learns of Piper's early release but organizes a surprise wedding with Nicky and Lorna so that Piper can have her prison wedding before leaving. Alex is then made to join the kickball team, where a knife fight is planned. However, the fight does not go ahead, and Alex enjoys the game.

In the seventh season, being a target of Madison, she decides to make her go to the SHU. Once it happens after she gets Badison to fight with Taystee, Hellman wants Alex to sell drugs for him while Badison is in the SHU, she has no choice but to do it, the CO threatening her with severe consequences if she doesn't. While trying to get Hellman busted with drugs in his locker, she is seen by McCullough who tells her to work for her instead. Artesian helps Alex get out of Hellman's business and makes her sell phone chargers for her. The two also meet regularly in a closet for business and intimate moments.

Alex and Piper's relationship struggles as both are not doing well but don't want to admit it to each other. Alex suggests to Piper that they should have an open relationship so Piper can release her stress. In the meantime, Alex gets closer to McCullough and the two start an affair. When Alex ends the affair to save her relationship with Piper, McCullough confronts Piper after work and tells her about it. Later, McCullough confesses her feelings for Alex to the warden Tamika Ward to get Alex transferred to Ohio. Seeing how bad the situation is with their relationship and because of the transfer, she breaks up with Piper and tells her she wants to set her free. Despite Alex's attempts to let Piper go, Piper is determined to stay with Alex and moves to Ohio so that they can continue their relationship.

=== Sam Healy ===
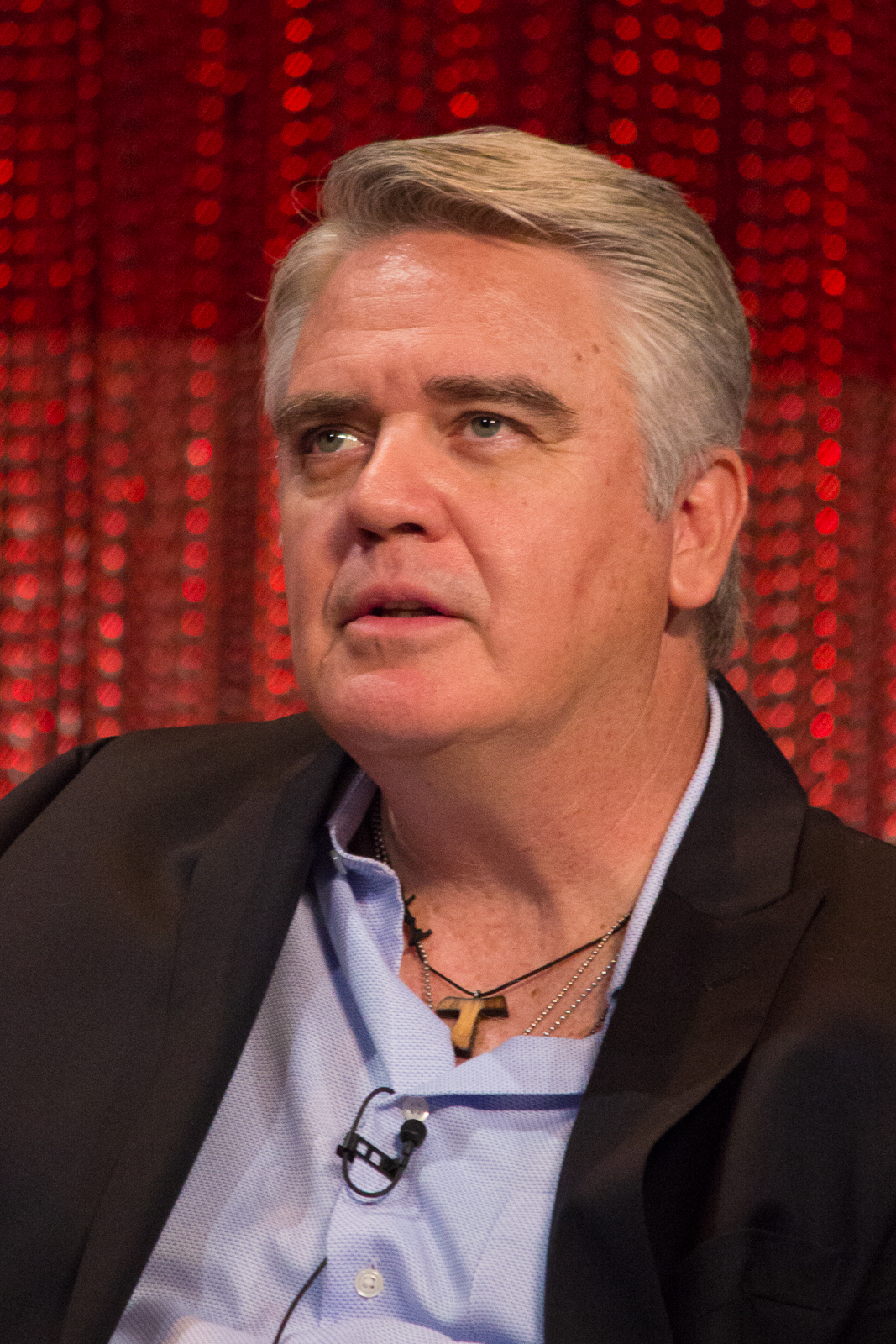
Michael J. Harney

Sam Healy (played by Michael J. Harney) – Healy is an experienced corrections officer and supervisor at Litchfield Penitentiary who has a master's degree in social work and acts as prison counselor to many of the inmates. He is initially presented as someone who, though rigid, genuinely wants to help the inmates under his care. Due to his preference for avoiding confrontation, Healy is contemptuously referred to as "Samantha" by Caputo, who feels that Healy is not tough enough on the inmates. Healy generally appears weary and often tells the inmates what they want to hear so they will leave him alone – he later admits to his own counselor that he is dissatisfied with his job, having gone into it with such idealistic notions of changing the world, but his experiences have left him cynical. Despite this, he still shows a sense of justice, such as forging evidence to show that Suzanne (who was going to take the fall for an assault she did not commit) was in fact innocent. Healy has an outspoken personal vendetta against lesbians for unknown reasons, cautioning Piper at the beginning of the series not to be involved with lesbian activity. While early on he appears particularly sympathetic towards Piper and even acts biased in her favor, he increasingly dislikes her as he hears rumors of her alleged lesbian activities. His hatred of lesbians, first presented as a quirk, is later revealed to be a deep-seated pathological problem when he explosively sends Piper to solitary confinement purely because she was dancing closely with Alex. In the fourth season, it is revealed that his hatred of lesbianism was imbued in him by his father, who believed that it was a disease akin to schizophrenia. His increasing disdain of Piper culminates in his acquiescence to Tiffany Doggett's attempt to murder her in the first-season finale.

During the second season, Healy makes amends with Piper, supporting her idea of a weekly prison newsletter and getting her a furlough to visit her dying grandmother. He also attempts to start a group counseling program with Tiffany, but cancels it due to poor attendance, further adding to his emotional exhaustion. At home, Healy is in a troubled and seemingly-loveless marriage with a Ukrainian mail-order bride, who speaks little English, and her mother. It is implied that Healy lied about himself to her on the Internet, and she is only staying with him because she has two years left until she gets her green card. In the third season, he enlists the help of Red to mediate between the two and bridge the language gap, however Red ends up lambasting his wife and defending Healy as a "good man". Following this, Healy and his wife appear to split, while Healy then forms a closer bond with Red. It is also implied they have mutual romantic feelings for one another; but Red initially flirts with him so that she can be reassigned on her job in the kitchen, much to Healy's dismay. Later, it seems that Red and Healy may still have hidden feelings for each other, as evidenced by a shared look during Lorna Morello's wedding. Red rejects the idea of developing their relationship, saying "their ships passed too late in the night", despite Healy's attempts to admit their feelings for each other. At times, Healy also finds himself at odds with new counselor Berdie Rogers and her alternative methods, feeling that she is encouraging the prisoners to engage in deviant behavior.

Healy's background is further explored in the fourth season. His mother suffered from severe mental illness, causing frequent stress to young Sam. When she began electroconvulsive therapy, her erratic behavior subsided. However, she confided to Sam that she wished to stop the therapy, as they caused her to feel "fuzzy" and forgetful. Sam protested against this, saying that he preferred her medicated. Following this, his mother left the home and never returned, with Healy still uncertain of her fate decades later. This experience causes problems between him and the schizophrenic Lolly, with Healy believing that her confession to murdering a guard is only a delusion. At the end of the fourth season, increasingly dissatisfied with his job and unsure if he is able to be effective, he contemplates suicide by walking into a lake, but returns to shore when he hears his phone ring. Later, rather than returning to work, he voluntarily checks himself into psychiatric care, and is later seen in the facility while watching Caputo's statement on television. He makes no appearance in the fifth season, but does make a brief appearance in the sixth season, when Caputo seeks his advice over how to challenge MCC for their treatment of Taystee and the other inmates, but his advice proves unhelpful, simply suggesting Caputo just let it go.

=== Claudette "Miss Claudette" Pelage ===
Claudette "Miss Claudette" Pelage (played by Michelle Hurst) – Miss Claudette is a very strict and feared inmate at the prison. She is often grumpy and holds her bunk-mates to very high standards. Her mysterious origins and fearsome reputation bred numerous legends, with some inmates humorously noting they never see her in the bathrooms. When Piper is assigned to share a cubicle with her, she reacts rudely due to her obsession with cleanliness and dislike of the messy situations Piper brings with her, but softens to her over time. It is later shown that Miss Claudette was inducted into forced child labor and sent to the United States from an unknown French-speaking country (possibly Haiti) to pay off a familial debt. She was brought to America by a boy called Jean-Baptiste with whom she develops a close friendship and later falls in love. Years later she ran her own illegal cleaning service using similar child labor. She kills a customer who beat and abused one of her cleaning girls, which is the basis for the rumor amongst the prisoners that she is in prison for murder. It is not clear if she was convicted for her business, the killing, or both. She also becomes heartbroken after Jean-Baptiste marries another woman.

Miss Claudette never gets mail, has not received a visitor in a decade of being incarcerated, and initially refuses help with her case as she has nothing to live for outside. However, when she receives a letter from Jean-Baptiste (whose wife has since died) she decides to appeal her conviction. Initially optimistic, her appeal is denied, and in a fit of anger she nearly strangles a prison guard in grief, and is immediately transferred to a maximum-security prison with an extended sentence. She does not reappear in subsequent seasons.

=== Galina "Red" Reznikov ===
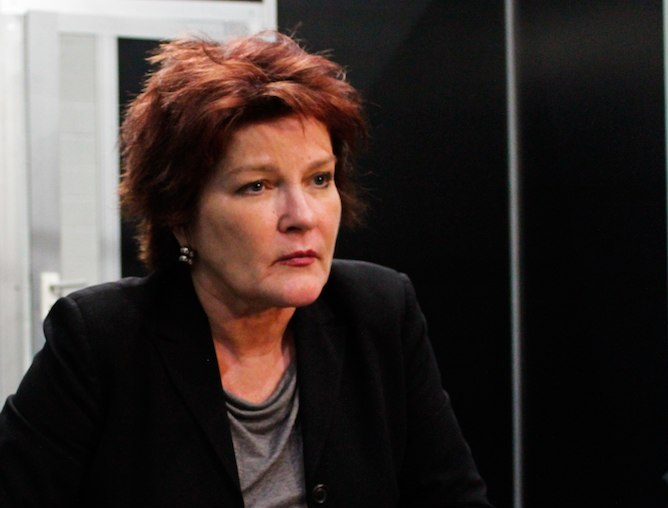
Kate Mulgrew

Galina "Red" Reznikov (played by Kate Mulgrew) – Red is a Russian inmate who runs the prison's kitchen as the head chef and is the behind-the-scenes leader of the prison's white population. She gets her name from both her ginger hair and her Russian heritage. In her earlier life, she and her husband had migrated from Russia and ran a struggling restaurant in Queens, eventually getting involved with the Russian mafia bosses who frequented their establishment. Red angered the mob bosses by punching one of their wives in the chest (rupturing a breast implant) after being excluded by their group, but later impressed the same boss by offering sound advice that allowed her to swiftly climb the ranks of the organization. Red is feared and respected by most of the prisoners, and has a lot of influence with Healy. Out of all of the girls in her group, she is closest to Nicky, and loves her as if she were her own daughter. She is always accompanied by Norma and Gina, who cater to her needs and work with her in the kitchen. Red runs a smuggling business out of her kitchen, using a food company she helped the Russian mafia set up, but refuses to import drugs of any kind. She actively uses her resources to help some of the inmates overcome drug addictions, although they have only "two strikes" before she abandons them because "Russians don't play baseball." When Mendez begins to force her to use her connections to bring in drugs, she hatches a plan to have him removed from the prison.

Red is initially pleasant to Piper until she unknowingly insults her cooking, and in response Red punishes her by starvation. Piper eventually repairs their relationship by making a lotion to help soothe Red's injured back. Red also has an odd obsession with a chicken that is allegedly seen on the prison grounds from time to time, as she wants to cook "real food" and also wants to absorb its "power." Towards the end of the first season, she is decommissioned from the kitchen by Caputo after he discovers Mendez's drug smuggling operation, which is blamed on Red. Caputo assigns Gloria as the new head chef, and the kitchen is then run by the Latina inmates. In an attempt to take Gloria and her "girls" out of the kitchen, Red sabotaged one of the ovens, causing Gina to get injured, thus straining her relationship with her friends severely. Red eventually becomes Piper's new roommate and befriends her, while at the same time she attempts to come to terms with her loss of friends and status, in the process befriending the "Golden Girls" — the older women in the prison.

Upon discovering a disused sewage drain in the prison greenhouse, Red restarts her smuggling business and reunites her shattered circle of friends. She has history with Vee, a returning prisoner who had befriended her when Red first went to prison years before the series began, only to beat her violently and try to take over her smuggling operation. Vee's appearance in the prison puts Red in competition with her. Following repeated threats from Vee against Red's girls and her family outside prison, Red attempts to strangle Vee during a blackout, but cannot bring herself to finish the job and instead agrees to a truce. However, Vee sneaks up on Red in the greenhouse and beats her violently with a sock with a padlock inside, sending her to the prison hospital. She at first keeps her silence to the authorities about Vee as her attacker, preferring instead to plot her revenge, but has a change of heart after speaking with Sister Ingalls.

Throughout the second season, visits from her son reveal that Red's family business is failing and the family itself is having money troubles. When Piper is granted furlough, Red asks her to stop by the shop, and Piper sees the business is closed down. Upon returning to prison, Piper lies and tells Red that the business is doing well. Red eventually discovers that Piper lied about the business's prosperity and berates her for attempting to cover it up. After divorcing her husband for failing to keep the business open, Red starts a friendship with Healy and uses this to get back into the kitchen. Healy convinces Caputo to let her back into the kitchen, but shortly after she takes over the kitchen, it is revealed that MCC has begun to order pre-packaged foods as a cost-saving measure, severely diminishing the quality of the food and limiting her ability to cook traditional meals.

In the fourth season, Red is distraught when she discovers that her new bunkmate has sleep apnea, and snores very loudly. This, together with the new breakfast timetable, severely affects Red's ability to sleep. She makes numerous attempts to silence her bunk mate, and eventually resorts to taking sleeping pills. In addition, she finds herself having to assist Alex, Lolly and Frieda in covering up Aydin's death. She is overjoyed when Nicky returns from max. However, shortly afterwards, some of Red's possessions disappear, and she later discovers that Nicky had stolen them to fund her relapse into drug addiction. She finds Nicky sitting on the floor in the showers and is heartbroken, feeling that she failed Nicky, and that her harsh policy on drugs contributed both to Nicky's relapse and to Tricia's death. After Nicky agrees to sober up again, Red goes to the drug dealers and threatens to tamper with their food if they sell drugs to Nicky just in case. After learning that Piper was branded with a swastika, she helps alter it to a window. When Aydin's body is found, Red is one of the first suspects, and Piscatella deliberately prevents her from sleeping in an attempt to force a confession. In response to the death of Poussey, Red tells her family to start building a new garden, as the last had been destroyed to make room for a new building, to keep them busy and out of trouble.

In the fifth season, Red learns whilst digging around in Caputo's office that CO Captain Desi Piscatella had previously murdered an inmate at the male prison where he used to work by boiling him alive. Horrified, and high on amphetamines from some pills she took, Red becomes obsessed with finding ways to take Piscatella down, and eventually finds what she believes are humiliating pictures of him, though she later discovers that he is not embarrassed by them at all. Eventually, she decides to try and force him to confess, so she steals CO Humphrey's phone and texts Piscatella encouraging him to storm the prison. He sneaks in wearing full riot gear, and starts kidnapping Red's girls. Red finds them whilst looking for Frieda's bunker, and is violently tortured by Piscatella, who rips the hair from her scalp. They are saved by the inhabitants of Frieda's bunker, who subdue Piscatella. After subduing him, Red initially wants to kill him, but is restrained. Later, she breaks free, but instead releases Piscatella. The bunker is then stormed by the CERT team, and Red is amongst those caught up in it.

In the sixth season, Red – now with a huge bald spot, which she covers with a rag – is held in Max, and forced to share a cell with Madison Murphy. Learning that Piscatella is dead, and that the Federal agents investigating the riot think that one of the inmates in the bunker did it, she attempts to get the message to the rest of her girls through charades, but it does not work. When she uses Madison to get the message out, Piper misunderstands, thinking it is Alex that is dead, and names Red as one of the instigators of the riot out of anger. Frieda does the same, in order to be sent to the safer B Block. Red is initially angered by their betrayal, but after discovering that Nicky could face an additional 70 years if she does not name Red as one of the instigators herself, she once again puts Nicky first and tells her to do so. With ten years added to her sentence, Red becomes obsessed with getting revenge on Frieda, and ingratiates herself with Carol Denning, the boss of C Block, becoming a trusted member of her team, knowing that she bears a vendetta against Frieda herself. Carol also gets her stylists to help fix Red's hair, which is dyed blonde. She is almost ambushed by an attack team from Carol's sister, Barb's rival gang, but Nicky manages to prevent it from happening. After finally reaching out to, and getting a visit from the rest of her family, Red is elated, but on the way to the visitation room, she sees Frieda, and violently attacks her, being sent to SHU, where she believes that Carol is more interested in defeating Barb than killing Frieda, and vows revenge against her herself.

In the seventh season, Red is eventually released from the SHU when it is closed down; however, it soon becomes clear she is not herself. She is sent to work in the kitchen of the nearby immigration centre, where she begins making simple mistakes and blaming them on others. Gloria and Nicky notice this and try to help cover them up, but when Red cuts herself with a knife, Nicky admits to the doctor Red's recent memory problems. Red is diagnosed with dementia, which was exacerbated by her recent stay in the SHU. Red is moved to B Block and initially is friendly to Frieda as she has forgotten who she is, although later attempts to kill her upon remembering that she missed seeing her family. Red's final appearance in the show shows her lovingly singing in Russian to Lorna, who was having mental issues of her own, due to the death of her newborn son.

=== Larry Bloom ===
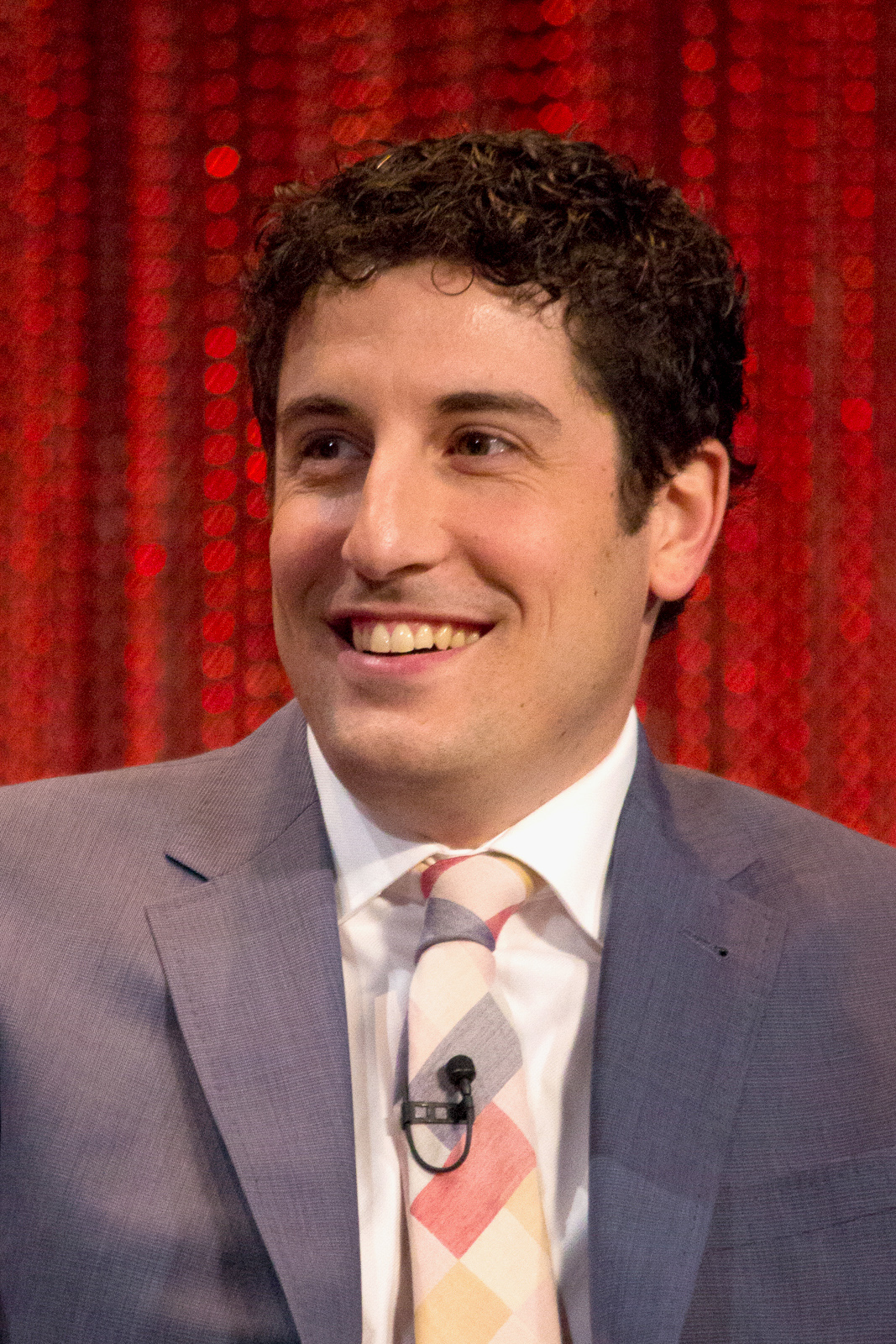
Jason Biggs

Larry Bloom (played by Jason Biggs) – Larry is a Jewish freelance writer trying to establish a journalism career, and Piper's anxious fiancé. He is blindsided at the beginning of the series when his then girlfriend Piper reveals to him her former life as a lesbian who smuggled cash for a drug cartel 10 years ago. Larry is initially vocally supportive of Piper, and proposes marriage to her before she goes inside. As the series progresses, he begins to lose interest toward her, becoming angry when he learns that Piper's former lover is in the same prison and that she did not tell him about it. Later on, he begins writing a newspaper article titled "One Sentence, Two Prisoners" about the experience of having a fiancée in prison. This article is published in The New York Times and allows him to move up in the journalistic world. He is close to his parents, who are strongly opposed to his marriage plans. After a conversation with Alex, Larry's controlled anxiety gets the better of him, and he breaks off his engagement with Piper. During the second season, he begins an affair with Piper's best friend Polly after becoming a more supportive partner than her husband, who was frequently gone for trips. Shortly after this, Larry and Polly reveal the affair to Piper and asked for her blessing in their relationship. At the end of the second season, Piper asks Larry and Polly to arrange for Alex to be thrown back in prison for violating her probation. Although Larry expresses doubts, Piper is able to appeal to Polly who agrees to help. While he did not appear in the third or fourth seasons, he appeared in a flashback during the fifth season, which reveals he has a tattoo of the Kool-Aid Man on his butt. When Piper mentions him to other inmates during the riot, one of them notes she's never heard his name and has no idea who he is. He appeared as a recurring character in the seventh season, in which he is still in a relationship with Polly and helping raise her child. Piper, now released from prison, asks to have dinner and catch up with him and Polly. They reveal they're expecting a child together. In the season finale, Piper shows up at Larry and Polly's townhouse. They briefly reflect on their relationship and Piper asks for advice on the next step to take in her own life. Larry tells her to "do what new Piper would do" and appears to have come to terms with the ending of their relationship and be genuinely supportive of Piper's path forward.

=== Suzanne "Crazy Eyes" Warren ===
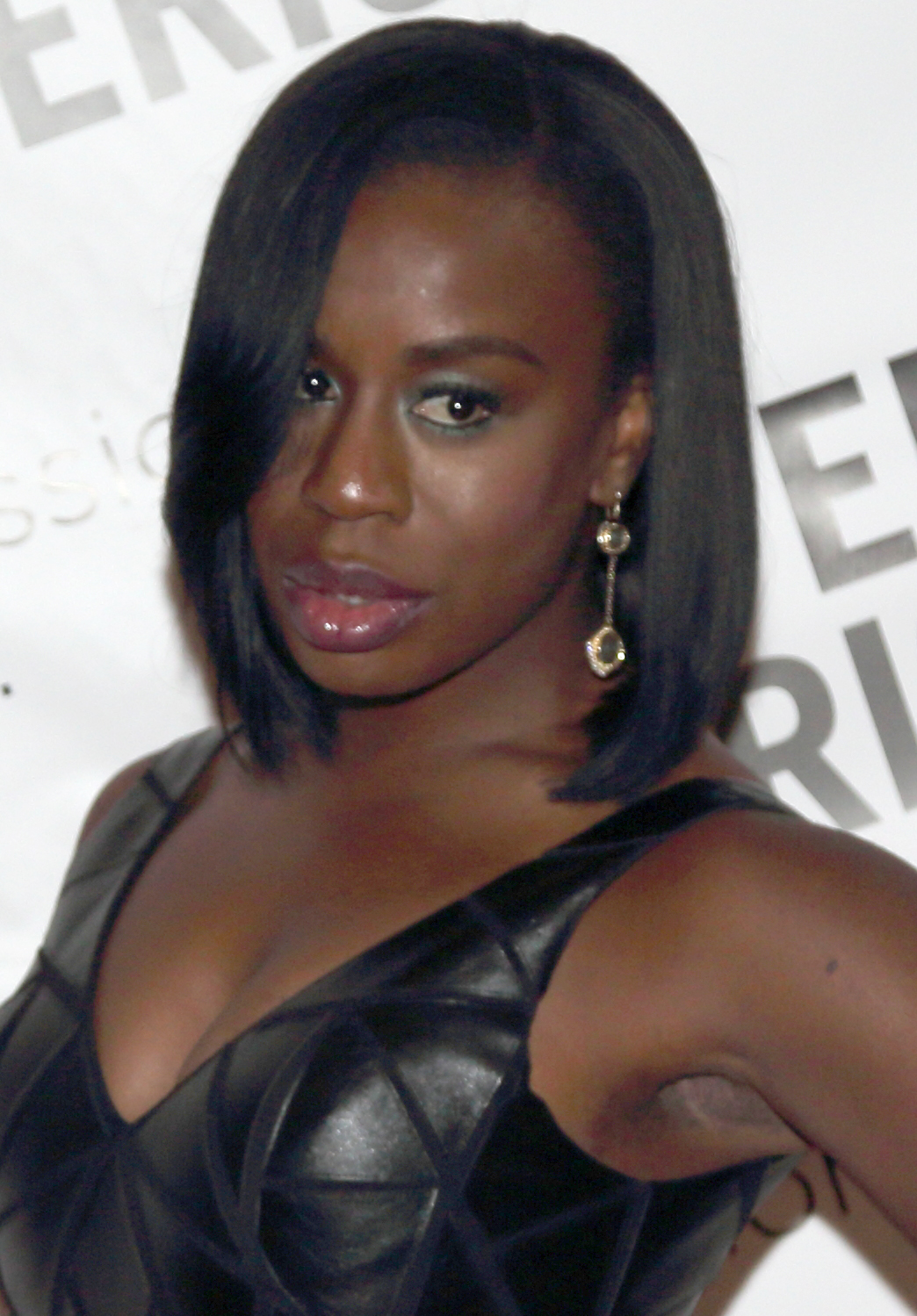
Uzo Aduba

Suzanne "Crazy Eyes" Warren (played by Uzo Aduba) – Suzanne is a mentally unstable inmate with a violent history, albeit generally passive and friendly. An African-American, she was raised by an adoptive middle class white couple who later had another daughter named Grace during Suzanne's childhood. For her race and mental illness, Suzanne was often shunned by her parents' community and her little sister's friends. Her parents tried to provide her with the best care growing up, but, despite their love, Suzanne felt pushed by her mother to accomplish things that she was afraid to do.

Suzanne is a lesbian who develops an obsession with Piper when she first arrives at Litchfield, giving her the pet name "Dandelion" because of Piper's blonde hair. She is initially portrayed as creepy and unpredictable due to her obsession with Piper, stalking her around the prison and submitting a request to bunk together. After being rejected, she urinates in Piper's cubicle. As the show progresses she acts more like a regular inmate, and is revealed that despite her mental illness, she is rather intelligent with a flair for reciting literature and poetry verbatim, often writing her own compositions. She received her nickname "Crazy Eyes" due to her tendency to widen her eyes when she talks. Suzanne is unaware of why exactly people call her "Crazy Eyes," but it is shown that she is hurt by the nickname. During the second season, it emerges that she gets stage fright, and on the night of Piper's altercation with Tiffany, had come outside in the midst of a panic attack, and mistaking Piper for her adoptive mother, punched her in the face, inadvertently making it look like a more even fight, saving Piper from severe punishment.

When Yvonne "Vee" Parker enters the prison and forms an African-American gang, Suzanne falls for Vee's charms and maternal influence, being exploited into becoming Vee's "muscle." While zealously loyal to Vee, Suzanne violently beat or threatened any inmates who crossed her, almost acting on command. Later, Vee attempts to coldly trick her into taking the fall for Red's severe beating, as a distraught Suzanne believes she may have done it unconsciously due to her violent history. During the third season, she is encouraged by the new counselor Berdie Rogers to be more creative, causing her to start writing several science fiction erotic stories that become a hit among the women in the prison. Suzanne reveals that she has no sexual experience and is completely naïve in regard to sex, having never actually had a girlfriend before, and that the stories are based on other sources. Eventually, the stories make their way to the staff, causing Rogers to get suspended. Meanwhile, Suzanne becomes nervous upon discovering that one of her fans, Maureen Kukudio, is interested in her romantically. Suzanne backs out of a possible sexual encounter, but is later seen forming a close bond with Maureen towards the end of the season.

In the fourth season, Suzanne becomes put off when Maureen turns out to be quite strange, and abandons her in the woods. For most of the season, she and Lorna attempt to find out who is defecating in the showers, before Nicky eventually deduces that it was Angie, and that she was doing it to smuggle drugs inside the prison. Through her conversations with Lorna, Suzanne is eventually convinced that she gave up on Maureen too quickly, and eventually approaches her to suggest they give the broom closet another go. Maureen agrees, but deliberately leaves Suzanne unsatisfied in retaliation for abandoning her in the woods. When Aydin's remains are discovered, Suzanne is one of the suspects because of her history of mental health problems, and is taken for questioning. In flashbacks, Suzanne lives with Grace and Grace's boyfriend, Brad. She works as a greeter at a hypermarket and befriends Dylan, a young child. When Grace and Brad leave for the weekend, she goes to the park, sees Dylan, and brings him to her apartment to play video games. Dylan became scared and called 911, and while fleeing from Suzanne, he climbs out of a window and falls off of the fire escape of her apartment.

While in the waiting room, Maureen approaches, seeking a reconciliation, but Suzanne goes and sits elsewhere. She then gets into a verbal dispute with white supremacist inmate Kasey Sankey after laughing at her when Officer Humphrey pulled her chair, and he immediately tries to escalate it into a full-on fight. Kasey declined to do so, but an embittered Maureen volunteers to fight Suzanne instead. In the subsequent fight, Maureen takes her taunting too far, and Suzanne violently tackles her to the ground and proceeds to beat her severely, before she is eventually dragged off. The incident unhinges Suzanne, and shortly afterwards, when she takes part in a non-violent stand-in in the prison canteen, the sight of Humphrey causes her to go into a full-on meltdown. Officer Bayley attempts to restrain her and take her to psych, inadvertently making Suzanne become more erratic. Poussey attempts to intervene, and is pinned to the ground by Bayley's leg while at the same time attempting to wrestle with Suzanne. As a result, Poussey is suffocated and dies on the canteen floor. Traumatized by the event, Suzanne attempts to deal with it by piling books on top of herself in order to find out what it felt like not to breathe. She eventually attempts to do so by pulling several bookshelves on top of herself, but luckily, a grieving Brook happens to be nearby, and she quickly alerts the COs. Suzanne is taken to the medical facility, where she discovers that her neighbor in the next bed is Maureen.

At the start of the fifth season, while continuing to recover in medical, Humphrey is brought in there next to them to be treated from his gunshot wound. She leaves medical, and rejoins the other inmates. Noticing that the place in the cafeteria Poussey died is not being respected, she becomes upset and makes a circle around the area after clearing the other inmates away from it. Later on, she attempts to speak to Poussey's spirit with some of the other inmates. Due to the change in her routine with the guards no longer in control, as well as a lack of medication, she begins to act crazier than normal, eventually resulting in her being handcuffed to a bunk and her face being painted. She is released by Lorna, who has taken control of the prison pharmacy, and Lorna decides not to give Suzanne her medication. While in the bathroom washing her face, she discovers Maureen inside of a stall with her injuries infected, and Suzanne takes her back to medical, where she discovers Humphrey is not breathing. Suzanne attempts to take Humphrey in a wheelchair to Taystee to show her, unknowingly putting negotiations at risk. Black Cindy and Alison take control of the situation, and Cindy ends up giving her some lithium to put her to sleep. Later, she is revived, and she ends up in Frieda's bunker prior to the riot team breaching the bunker.

In the sixth season, it is revealed that Suzanne and Black Cindy had hidden from the CERT team in the bunker, and borne witness to the team scheming to pin Piscatella's death on the inmates in the bunker. They escaped the bunker and hid in a supply closet, giving them plausible deniability for having been there. However, due to having gone several days without her medication, Suzanne is unable to concentrate, or to keep her story straight, and begins hallucinating. Eventually, after finally getting her medication back, she remembers enough to tell the officers that neither she nor Cindy were in the bunker, and to explain why she previously suggested she had been. She is then released into B Block, one of the safer blocks, and becomes Frieda's cellmate. She is initially unsure about re-approaching her old friends, but eventually is persuaded to by Frieda, and makes amends with them. When kickball is brought back to the prison, Suzanne proves to be a star player, and at the end of the season, joins the team on the outdoor field, completely unaware that a knife fight is due to take place. However, when her kick goes high, one of the opposing team's members puts her knife away to catch Suzanne out. This causes both blocks to forget about the fight and immerse themselves in the game, which prevents a bloodbath.

=== Tasha "Taystee" Jefferson ===
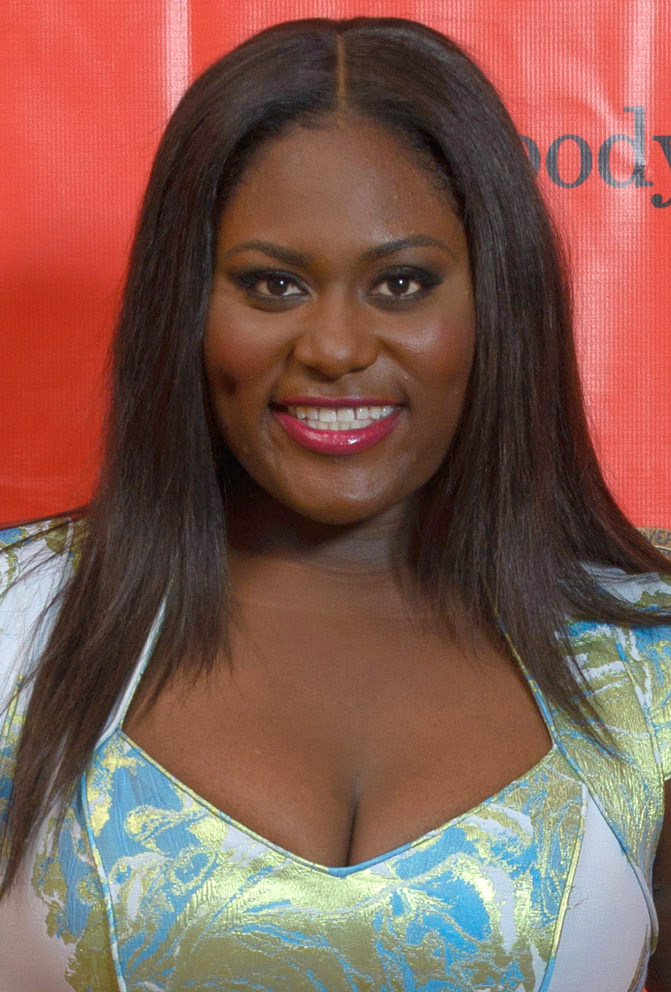
Danielle Brooks

Tasha "Taystee" Jefferson (played by Danielle Brooks) – Taystee is the black representative on the WAC. She works in the prison library. With coaching from Poussey and a makeover from Sophia, Taystee is paroled from the prison. However, as she has been in institutions most of her life and finds it hard to adapt to the rough life she finds outside the prison walls, she re-offends in violation of her parole and is subsequently sent back to prison. Following her return, she is assigned to the recently vacated bunk of Miss Claudette as Piper's roommate.

Taystee is quite intelligent and well-read, with a strong ability to remember information and an aptitude for business and mathematics that initially helped her become involved in Vee's drug ring. Owing to her time spent in the prison law library, she has accrued a wide knowledge base concerning the law. Taystee's childhood was a rough one, spent in foster homes, and she was eventually taken in by Vee to help with her heroin business. She has known Vee on the outside for 15 years and becomes a member of her prison gang in the second season. Eventually, when Poussey's actions damage Vee's business, Vee decides to cut her losses and appease her by expelling Taystee from the group. Finally seeing Vee for what she is, Taystee later rallies the other black inmates to turn on her former idol. During the third season, Taystee finds herself becoming the leader of her group and ends up having to be the one to keep them in control. Later on, in the season, she helps Poussey save Brook Soso after a suicide attempt and welcomes her into their group.

During the fourth season, Taystee finds herself being assigned as Caputo's secretary. She uses her new position to influence some of the decisions Caputo makes on behalf of the inmates, to include convincing him to play The Wiz during movie night. She also convinces Caputo to give her a wristwatch, which none of the other inmates have, and it is later broken by one of the guards. While Caputo was gone, she successfully guessed his computer password and used his computer to surf the Internet. After Poussey died, she was devastated, but refused to take the day off from being Caputo's secretary, offering to call the police for him and trying to convince him to call Poussey's dad. Unknown to Caputo, she was present during the press release announcing Poussey's death and was angered when he stated Bayley was not being arrested and when Caputo failed to mention Poussey's name. Following this, she went through the halls shouting that Bayley was being let off, causing an uprising among all of the inmates.

At the beginning of the fifth season, after the inmates take control of the prison, Taystee punches Caputo in the face and holds him and Josh from MCC hostage. She attempts to force Caputo to make a statement on video stating that Bayley murdered Poussey, but he refuses to and she finished the statement herself. Frustrated that the video did not get the views she wanted, she handed Caputo to the Spanish inmates. Following this, she negotiates with the white supremacist inmates for possession of Judy King, who she plans to use to release a statement about their treatment in the prison to the press to the protest of Janae. During Judy's statement, Taystee interrupts her and speaks about how they are treated herself, as well as revealing Judy's special treatment, before releasing Judy and going back into the prison.

Taystee ends up being the prison's spokesperson for negotiations, and she presents the list of demands voted on by the other inmates, disappointed that Bayley's arrest was so low on the list. She ends up negotiating with Figueroa, who was sent on behalf of the governor and has Caputo by her side during the negotiations. After a video of Piscatella torturing Red, Alex, and others goes viral on the Internet, the governor agrees to meet all of their demands except for the arrest of Bayley due to his alleged murder of Poussey being outside of the state's jurisdiction. Taystee refuses to accept the remaining demands without the demand for Bayley's arrest being met and kicks Figueroa and Caputo out. After Maria leads the guards out of the prison, the state orders the riot team to take back the prison after Maria reveals that the guards were not released by Taystee. After Taystee fails to stop the guards from breaching, she flees to Red's bunker and after seeing Piscatella she grabs Frieda's gun and almost shoots him for contributing to Poussey's death, before being talked down. After Piscatella is released, she and the other inmates in the bunker stand together as the riot team breaches the bunker.

In the sixth season, Taystee is being held in max and is abused by the guards who suspect her of killing Piscatella. She is unaware of his death until after Black Cindy reluctantly testifies against her. She also comes face to face with her former friend, Tamika Ward, who is now a CO at max, and the two clash over being on opposite sides of the bars. In a flashback, Taystee and Ward are working at a fast-food restaurant and are smoking marijuana during a period they had no customers. Later that night an old classmate of hers, Michael Spence, enters the restaurant and attempts to rob them. After claiming she is unable to get into the cash register (she was afraid the management wouldn't believe her if he robbed them and would punish them instead) she gives Michael her "Gordons" (a pair of counterfeit Air Jordans) and then she and Ward walk home joking with each other. Back in the present, she is offered a plea deal by the public defender to plead guilty to murdering Piscatella and get life imprisonment. However, she is inspired by the members of Black Lives Matter and the ACLU who attend her hearing, and rejects the plea deal, deciding to plead not guilty. As the trial goes on, she starts to wonder if she made the right decision, and reaches out to Caputo for help. Caputo initially tries to find the CERT leader Herrmann who helped cover up CERT's role in Piscatella's death and then seeks to draw negative publicity to MCC in the hope of eliciting sympathy from the jury. He also provides moral support to Taystee by encouraging her to take the stand in her defense, which results in her speaking about her desire to see former CO Bayley tried for Poussey's death. Ultimately, however, Taystee is found guilty of Piscatella's murder.

At the beginning of the seventh season, she appears extremely angry and hopeless due to her wrongful conviction. At one point, she attacks Madison after a brief encounter between the two. She appears to accept the fact that she is going to spend the rest of her life in prison and begins to become suicidal. Ward, who was promoted to the warden, gave her back her old job as the secretary for the warden. At one point Suzanne wrote a letter detailing the true circumstances of Piscatella's death at the hands of the CERT officers but she throws away the letter. Ward finds the letter and encourages her to try and use it to get her conviction overturned, but she was not successful. Later in the season, she starts to tutor Tiffany while she tried to prepare for the GED exam. Near the end of the season, she attempted to commit suicide by hanging herself from her bunk bed, but does not complete the act and later finds Tiffany on the floor overdosing. After Tiffany's death, she discovers that she successfully got her GED. In a flashback that took place during the events of the first season while she was out on probation, she is joking around with Poussey over the phone. After several attempts, she successfully gets in touch with Judy and talks to her about doing a loan program for inmates being released from prison to help them get back on their feet. With Judy's help, she is able to get the Poussey Washington Fund started and at the end of the series, she is briefing several inmates about to be released about the fund.

=== Nicole "Nicky" Nichols ===
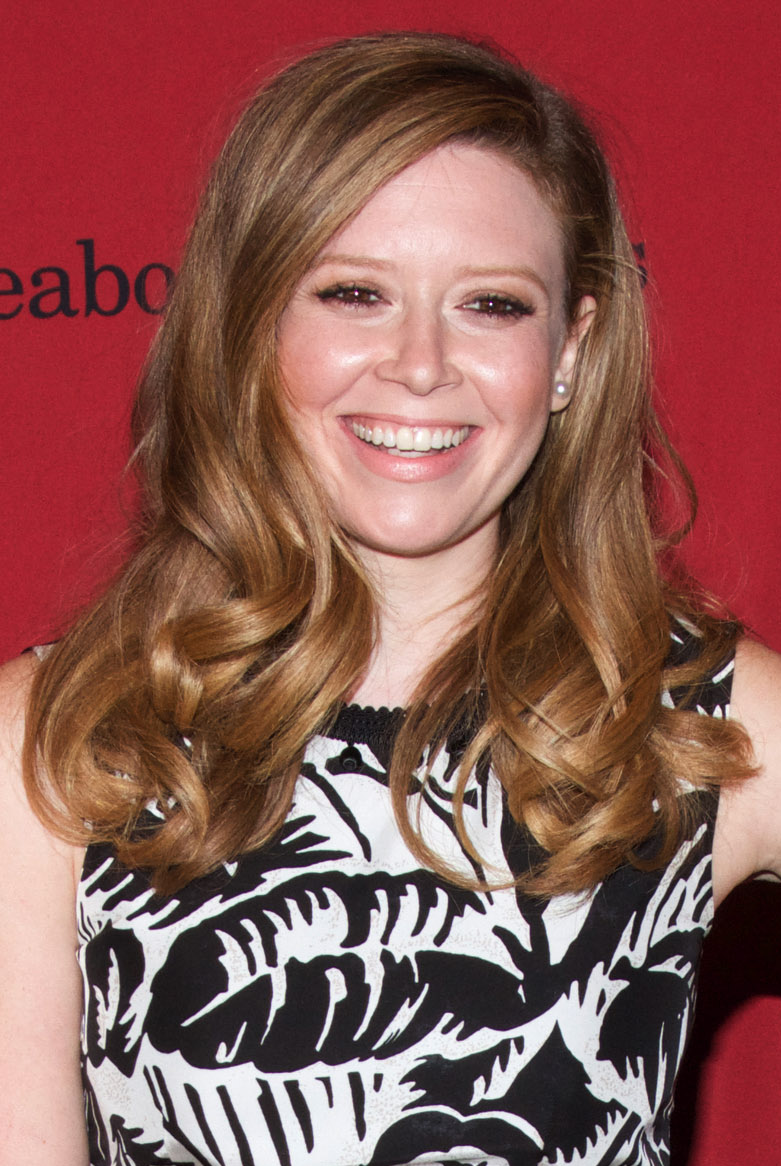
Natasha Lyonne

Nicky Nichols (played by Natasha Lyonne) – A former drug addict, now Red's most trusted assistant, Nicky is a witty and acerbic Jew from New York City, with a loud mouth. She swiftly befriends both Piper and Alex, expressing curiosity about what happened between the two of them outside of prison. She is estranged from her mother, a wealthy but extraordinarily selfish socialite who now lives in Brazil. When she was a child, Nicky was raised by a nanny and lived in a separate house from her mother. Her father was always cheating on her mother when she was growing up, leading to a deep resentment between her parents and causing her father to almost never look after her. This estrangement from her parents was what initially led to Nicky's drug addiction. Upon arriving in prison, Red had helped her through her worst bouts of cold turkey. For this reason, Nicky has disowned her mother, and now looks up to Red as a mother figure, to the point where she openly calls her "mom" in the presence of other inmates, and Red in turn openly treats her as if she were her daughter. Nicky was involved in a friends-with-benefits relationship with Lorna until Lorna broke it off, which Nicky is bitter about for some time, but she later develops a brief interest in Alex. Nevertheless, Nicky continues to make numerous attempts to get back together with Lorna throughout the series, suggesting that her feelings for her may be romantic. Nicky has a scar on her chest from having heart surgery as a complication of a bacterial infection in her heart, which came from using a dirty needle. Having been clean for two years, Nicky uses sex with the other inmates as a coping mechanism, becoming something of a nymphomaniac in the process. During the second season, Nicky stages a sex-based point scoring competition with Big Boo, during which Nicky even makes advances on Officer Fischer. She gets revenge on Vee for Red's slocking by stealing her stash of heroin, causing her to again face her addiction. In the third season, she attempts to get the stolen heroin out of the prison. She decides to work with Luschek so he could sell it on the outside and split the profits with her. During a surprise inspection, drugs are discovered under Luschek's desk and he blames her for it, causing her to get sent to max. On her way out, she exchanges brief goodbyes with Lorna and Red, and as the prison van pulls up at the facility, Nicky expresses her satisfaction to Tiffany that she will never be able to hurt them or anyone she cares about again, lamenting that, even after kicking her drug addiction, she may never lose her self-destructive tendencies. In the fourth season, Nicky is surviving in Max, and celebrates three years sobriety. She is initially shown ending a fling with Stella Carlin after discovering that she is using drugs again, but shortly after, falls off the wagon and starts using them herself. She has also been sending Luschek hate mail, and angrily castigates him when he comes to visit her, attempting to apologize. Eventually, with the help of Judy King, Luschek secures her return to the regular prison, and she has an emotional reunion with Red and Lorna. However, as a result of her relapse, she begins to steal from Red to purchase drugs from the various dealers across the prison, and at the same time makes numerous failed attempts to convince Lorna to restart their relationship. When Red confronts her and breaks down in tears at watching her adoptive daughter destroy herself, as happened with Tricia, Nicky reluctantly agrees to clean herself up again. Unbeknownst to her, Red uses her influence to get all of the prison drug dealers to cut Nicky off, while Pennsatucky provides her with emotional support. She concludes the season clean, but admits to Lorna that she is happy and a "junkie addict liar."

In Season 5, Nicky hides out in the pharmacy with Lorna during the riot and acts as a doctor/therapist to the inmates, helped by her knowledge of drugs. She gives up trying to get back together with Lorna (claiming that she is hopelessly in love with her and knows that Lorna will never love her back), but is later convinced by Lorna into having sex. Later, when Lorna claims that she is pregnant with her husband’s baby, Nicky ends their relationship after realizing that she can not give Lorna the mental help she needs. She and Alex decide to get makeovers from Flaca and Maritza, resulting in her getting bangs and her hair straightened. She is later seen having sex with an unknown blonde inmate while Lorna looks on sadly. Nicky is then kidnapped by Piscatella while caring for Red, and is held hostage with other members of Red's Family. After Piscatella is tied up in Frieda's Bunker, Nicky returns to Lorna and finds out that Lorna is actually pregnant. She then calls Lorna's husband Vince and tells him that Lorna is really pregnant, a very loyal person who cares about him, and that he needs to take Lorna back. The season ends with her telling Lorna to surrender to law enforcement for her safety before leading Taystee, Cindy, and Suzanne down to the bunker, where the fate of everyone in the bunker remains unknown.

In Season 6, Nicky is threatened with 70 extra years of drug charges and is forced to say that Red had a part in organizing the riot and kidnapping Piscatella. She and Red remain on good terms however, as she talked to Red first and warned her. She is placed in D Block in Maximum Security, where she is reunited with Lorna. She becomes friends with the leader of D Block, Barbara Dennings, and helps her get sober. However, when the war between C Block and D Block starts to threaten Red’s life, Nicky begins to try and separate herself and Lorna from the problems. She marries Piper and Alex in the season finale in a surprise wedding that she and Alex planned. Nicky then convinces Lorna to hide from the kickball game and stay out of the cell block war. When Barbara and Carol don't show up, she convinces the rest of D Block that the fighting is pointless, and the kickball game continues with nobody harmed.

=== Tiffany "Pennsatucky" Doggett ===
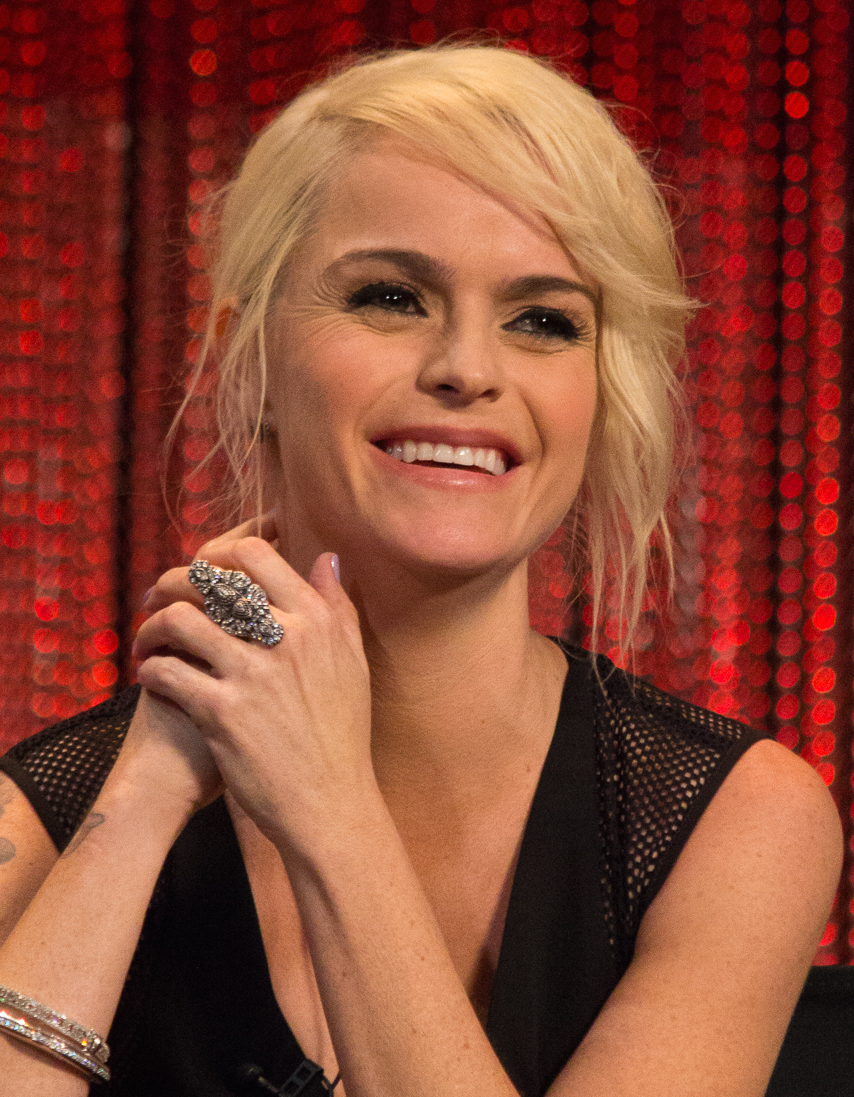
Taryn Manning

Tiffany "Pennsatucky" Doggett (played by Taryn Manning) – Doggett is a former drug addict (meth) originally from Waynesboro, Virginia. Her nickname is a reference to "Pennsyltucky," a slang term for poor rural areas in central Pennsylvania. Tiffany has very bad teeth due to drug abuse and initially appears to be a fundamentalist Christian. Frequently preaching about God, her religious rants are often laced with racism and hostility. She also caused the ceiling of the prison's chapel to collapse when she tries to hang an oversized cross from an overhead pipe. For some time, Tiffany believed that she was blessed with "faith healing" abilities, after being tricked by the other inmates, and eventually gets sent to the psych ward when she attempts to forcibly "heal" a visiting paraplegic juvenile delinquent. Despite this, it is revealed Tiffany was sent to prison for shooting an abortion clinic worker in broad daylight for making a snarky comment about her having had five previous abortions. The local press believed that it was instead because of her religious beliefs – leading to her receiving funding, support, and even a fan base from some anti-abortion religious groups.

Tiffany dislikes Piper after she is placed on the WAC committee despite Piper not having run for the position, and also has a long-running hostile relationship with Alex, with the two of them clashing frequently. Although it is Piper who gets Tiffany released from the psych ward, Tiffany declares a violent vendetta against Piper, eventually attempting to kill her after Piper rebuffed her religious beliefs, but instead, Piper beats her up badly. After the beating, she appears to have gotten over her vendetta, presumably because Piper's beating allowed her to get a new set of porcelain teeth at the expense of the prison. Tiffany loses her religious fervor, becoming more easy-going and moderate in her beliefs after attending regular counseling sessions with Healy. Nevertheless, her old friends are now unafraid to stand up to her, and abandon her, leaving her on her own. Ultimately, she finds an unlikely friend in Big Boo, who has also been abandoned by her friends, and Tiffany subsequently cuts her hair short on Boo's advice.

After the prison's van is stolen, Tiffany replaces Lorna as the prison's van driver and begins a friendship with Charlie "Donuts" Coates, a new guard who initially seems friendly but exhibits unsettling behavior when they are alone. Later, after Coates gets reprimanded by Caputo and put on probation for missing count, he rapes Tiffany in the prison van. Through flashbacks, it is shown she has a warped view of sex due to her upbringing, having prostituted herself for six-packs of soda, and that she was repeatedly raped in the past to the point she no longer fights back. At one point Tiffany had developed a non-abusive romance with a boy called Nathan, but the relationship ended after he was forced to move away with his parents to Wyoming. Big Boo – now her closest friend – devises a plan to get revenge for Coates' actions, but they decide not to go through with it. To prevent future rapes, Tiffany fakes a seizure while driving and gets off van detail. However, she sees that Maritza Ramos is her replacement, realizing that she may have provided Coates with a more naïve and vulnerable victim.

In the fourth season, Tiffany remains worried that Coates is raping Maritza, and continues to avoid him. Throughout the season, Coates becomes perturbed when Tiffany continually acts coldly and angrily towards him and eventually confronts her to ask why. She responds by asking him whether he is having sex with Maritza, and when he is confused by the question, she tells him that she wants to make sure he is not raping her, as he did with her. Coates is genuinely shocked by this disclosure. He later offers her an apology, and Tiffany decides to accept and forgive him. Unfortunately, this costs Tiffany her friendship with Boo, although she later makes amends and convinces Boo that she forgave Coates for herself, and not for him. Later, when Coates tells her that he is planning to quit his job, due to the horrors that he has witnessed at the prison, she tries to persuade him not to go and kisses him. He initially returns it but stops himself from initiating sex, telling her that he does not want to make the same mistake again and that he is leaving anyway.

During the fifth season, after the other guards were taken hostage, Tiffany hides Coates in the laundry room from the other inmates. While hiding, she is giving Coates food and the two are kissing. Leanne and Angie discover Coates, and after Tiffany grabs Humphrey’s gun she throws it to Coates. The gun goes off, shooting Leanne’s finger off, and he runs out of the prison. The other inmates put her on trial for assisting a guard, and Boo steps up as her lawyer to defend her. She is put on probation to the ire of Leanne and Angie, and the two of them bully her to force her to violate her probation. At the end of the season, Tiffany has escaped the prison in the confusion of the riot and was hiding in Coates' house. She hugs Coates while she has a gun in her hand and then asks him to join her on the couch to watch TV.

At the beginning of the sixth season, Tiffany was hiding in the trunk of Coates' car as he and Officer Dixon take a "road trip" that intervenes on their romantic trip. While parked in front of a hotel, she eventually gets tired of hiding in the trunk, goes up to their hotel room, and gets in bed with Coates. Later, she puts on a disguise and she, Coates, and Dixon go to an amusement park, where she and Coates are mistaken for a gay couple and harassed before Dixon steps in. They go to a bar and see on TV that a manhunt was put out for her and Coates decides to try to take Tiffany to Canada to try and keep her out of prison. They camp in the woods near the border, and after Coates falls asleep she goes to a local police station to turn herself in so Coates isn't implicated in her escape. Once Tiffany is back in prison, she is being held in solitary. After getting new MCC Senior Vice President Linda Ferguson to come to her cell, she negotiates her way into Florida in exchange for not revealing that Linda had sexual relations with Boo during the riot. At the end of the season, Tiffany is playing kickball with the other inmates after convincing Suzanne to join her.

In the seventh season, Tiffany tries out a number of the prison's new educational programs, out of little more than boredom, but is underwhelmed by them all. Eventually, she joins the General Education Development (GED) program. She initially takes to the class well, largely because of the enthusiasm and empathetic teaching style of the tutor, Elmer Fantauzzo. When she fails her first test, she is about to give up the class, but Elmer takes her to one side and tells her of his belief that she has dyslexia. Having been told that she is stupid by her emotionally abusive father for most of her life, Tiffany is filled with hope at the realization that she simply has an impairment to her reading abilities, and that with the correct tutoring and extra time on the exam, she could end up getting her GED after all. Unfortunately, after Linda refuses further funding for the programs, and Elmer quits after Daya's gang attempt to blackmail him into smuggling drugs for them, Tiffany is left with the unqualified Taystee as a tutor. However, Taystee familiarises herself with dyslexia learning techniques and soon has Tiffany back on track. On the day of the exam, however, Tiffany is horrified to learn that Luschek – who assumed responsibility of the course after Elmer quit – failed to put in an application for her extra time, due to his lack of care. As such, she is forced to do the exam at the normal time. Convinced that she has failed, Tiffany explodes at a remorseful Luschek for his selfishness, and for ruining everything for her. Despondent, she goes into the laundry where Daya and her gang are taking fentanyl. Daya and some of her gang leave, but one of them stays behind to take some more, and Tiffany asks for some. Shortly after, Taystee is heading to her cell to commit suicide when the woman exits the laundry hurriedly and advises Taystee to leave as well. Taystee enters to find Tiffany unresponsive on the floor after overdosing and screams for help whilst cradling her in her arms. Tiffany is pronounced dead at the scene, and her body is taken away by the coroner; Tiffany ultimately leaves the prison in a body bag. It is left ambiguous as to whether Tiffany intentionally committed suicide, or simply overdosed whilst in a state of despondency and reckless abandon. However, her death prompts Taystee to reconsider her suicidal ambitions, and Luschek to take the fall for Gloria's mobile phone, preventing her from getting more time added to her sentence. Suzanne later leads the residents of the Florida wing in a memorial service for Tiffany, and Taystee is both proud and saddened to discover that Tiffany had successfully passed her GED.

=== Dayanara "Daya" Diaz ===
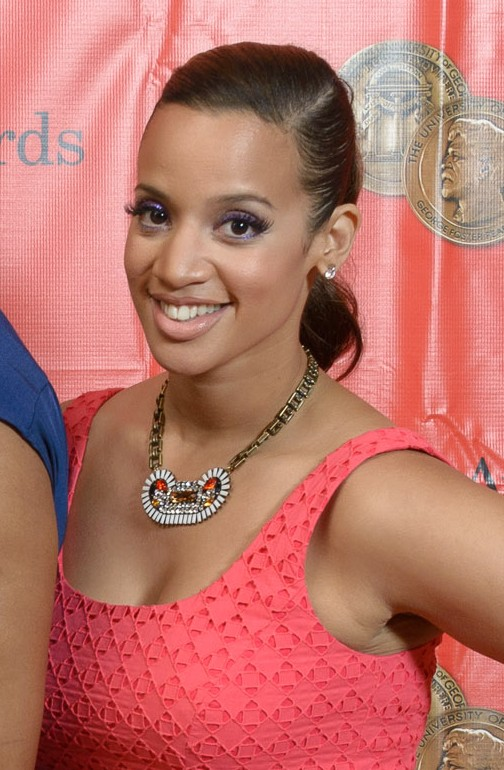
Dascha Polanco

Dayanara "Daya" Diaz (played by Dascha Polanco) – A Puerto Rican inmate with artistic talents. She is the daughter of Aleida Diaz, with whom she has a strained relationship, as her mother often ignored her and her sisters as young girls in favor of going out and partying. Daya is often criticized by her fellow Hispanic inmates because she cannot speak fluent Spanish. She developed a romantic relationship with prison guard John Bennett and became pregnant with his child. Knowing that Bennett could be imprisoned for impregnating her, Daya joined forces with Red to trick Mendez into having sex with her so that he can be blamed for her pregnancy. During the second season, she is shown to be increasingly hormonal and emotional due to the pregnancy, a contrast from her sweet demeanor in the first season. She begins to believe that Bennett should serve time for her pregnancy in order to allow them to be together and raise their child after they are both released.

In the third season, Bennett proposes to her, and she expects them to have a relationship after she is released. However, after a meeting with Cesar, Bennett appears to abandon Daya and the baby. Distraught and hopeless, she decided to give her child up for adoption to Mendez's mother Delia. Instead, Aleida tricks Delia into thinking the baby died during childbirth, while in reality the child, who Daya named Armaria, was given to Cesar. However, shortly after Cesar gets Armaria, his home is raided by the DEA and Daya's daughter is taken away. Daya was concerned about the fate of Armaria during the fourth season, after finding out Cesar was sent to prison and was worried that she would get lost in the foster care system. With her mother being released, Daya decided that she wanted to start hanging out with women closer to her age, resulting in her going to the salon and working with Maria and her group, in spite of the concerns of Gloria, who promised Aleida that she would take care of Daya. At the end of the fourth season, she is in the middle of the riot that was started when Taystee informed the rest of the inmates that Bayley was not arrested for Poussey's death. Officer Humphrey attempts to pull out a smuggled gun and is pushed over by Maritza, causing it to fall in front of Daya. She grabs it and takes Humphrey and Officer McCullough hostage, while most of the other inmates present loudly cheer her on and urge her to shoot Humphrey.

At the beginning of the fifth season, Daya, while trying to decide what to do with Humphrey and McCullough, gets annoyed at Humphrey and shoots him in the leg while he is trying to appeal to her in Spanish, pointing out that she does not understand him. Following the shooting, the inmates take over the prison and Daya is presumed to be in charge, due to her possession of the gun. Later that night, she was hit from behind and the gun was taken from her. The following morning, she pretends to still have the gun until it is discovered Gloria took it from her. She decided to distance herself from the other inmates and go outside with the inmates that are attempting to take no part in the uprising, taking this time to paint Bennett on the garden shed. Due to a media interview featuring Judy King and her mother, Judy reveals that a guard was shot during the riot, causing negotiations to end the standoff to halt until the shooter is turned over. Not wanting to be the reason negotiations fail, and growing fed up with Aleida's control after being ordered to lie that the shooting was in self-defense, she decided to turn herself in. Prior to surrendering, she called Delia and revealed that her daughter is alive. She asks Delia to adopt her and give her a better life, and after Delia tells her yes and she ensured that Delia knew how to correctly pronounce Armaria's name, she ends the call and goes outside the prison to surrender.

In the sixth season, with Humphrey now dead, Daya has accepted a plea deal to plead guilty to his murder in return for life imprisonment, thereby avoiding the death penalty. However, she is repeatedly beaten, attacked and otherwise hated by the CO's for being a "guard killer." Due to the frequent beatings from the guards, she is struggling with a broken hip. Daya receives help from Dominga "Daddy" Duarte, the right-hand woman of D-Block gang leader Barb Denning, who had taken a shine to her. Unfortunately, she becomes addicted to opioids when Daddy gives them to her to help with her physical pain. After Daddy accidentally wrecks her own drug smuggling operation, Daya goes into withdrawal, and in a desperate bid to obtain drugs, steals from Barb's personal stash. When Daddy confronts her about it, Daya kisses her, and the two become romantically involved. Daya then volunteers to smuggle drugs in through Blanca in return for helping her obtain some of her boyfriend's semen so that she can artificially inseminate herself, but ends up getting jumped by some of the members of Blanca's block gang. She then persuades Aleida to help her smuggle in drugs via her new boyfriend Rick Hopper, who is the captain of the guards at the prison. She becomes a fully-fledged member of Barb's gang, but her newly acquired addiction to heroin distresses her mother.

At the beginning of the seventh season, she continues her relationship with Daddy, but she becomes upset when she walks in on her having sex with another inmate and then claiming that it was just business. Intending to teach Daddy a lesson, she gives her some bath salts under the assumption she would have a similar episode as Barb but she dies from an overdose instead. Immediately after Daddy's death, she takes over Daddy's gang and becomes even more ruthless in her methods. In an attempt to devise different methods to get drugs into the prison, she at one point threatens Elmer Fantauzzo, Tiffany's GED prep course teacher, by implying she would target his son if he doesn't smuggle drugs in for her. When Aleida is returned to Litchfield after her parole violation Daya immediately attempts to assert dominance and then intentionally sets her and Hopper up to be caught having sex in the SHU as a distraction so she could recover her contraband that was confiscated earlier by the guards. At the end of the series, she reveals to Aleida that she got her little sister Eva involved in her drug smuggling operation and threatened to get the rest of her younger siblings involved. This revelation causes Aleida to punch Daya in the throat and begins choking her, fully intending to kill her. However, if she is successful or not is not shown on-screen.

- Polanco states that Daya survives after a final scene in which Aleida attacks her; Polanco stated that OITNB writers revealed this to her.

=== Lorna Morello ===
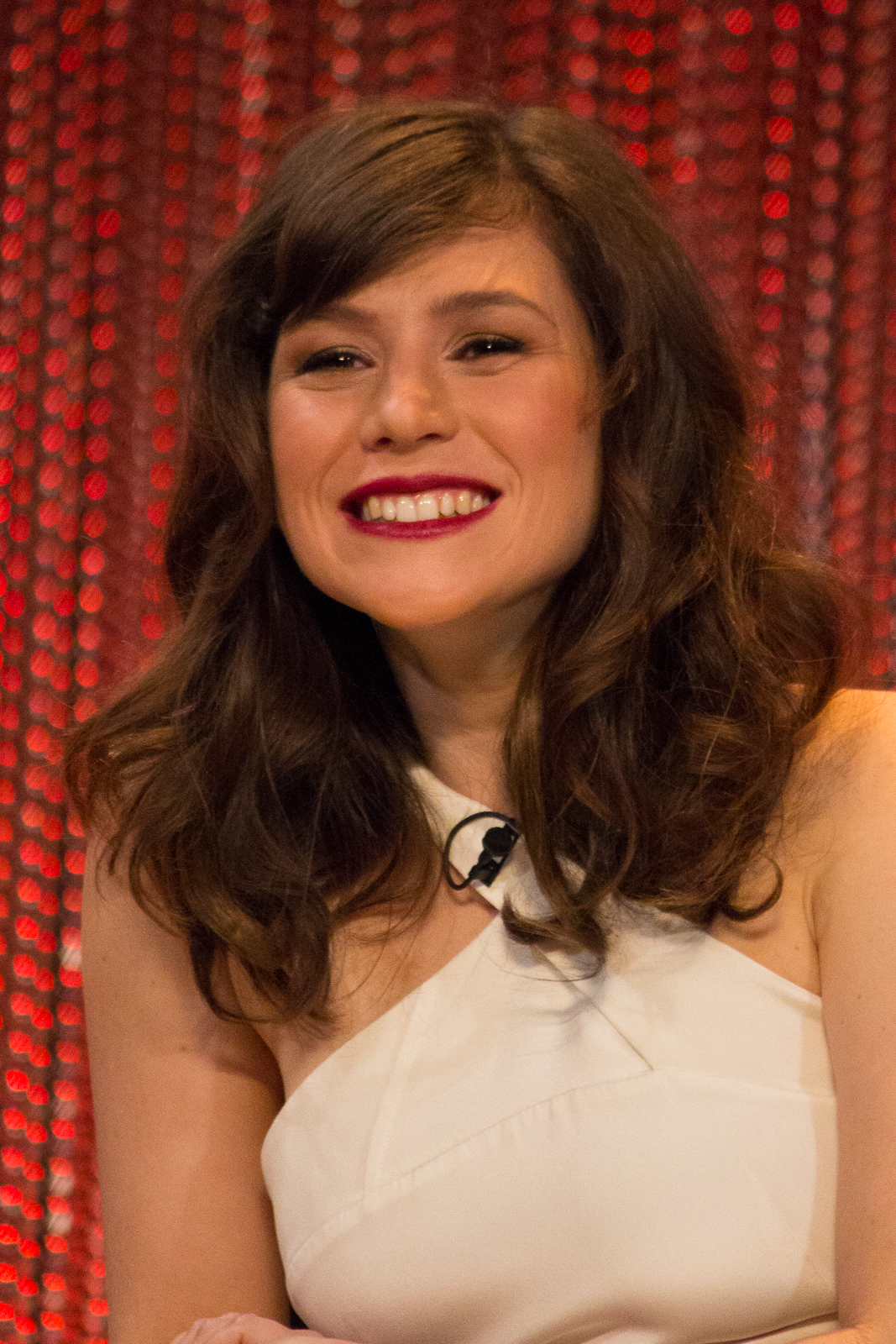
Yael Stone

Lorna Morello (played by Yael Stone) – A hyper-feminine and often racist Italian-American inmate, with a strong accent that inexplicably mixes regional features from both New York City and Boston. Lorna is usually sweet and positive, though she can also be very paranoid and manipulative. She seems to suffer from some sort of mental illness. She is the first inmate that Piper talks to since she was in charge of driving the van that transports inmates, and she helps Piper acclimate in her first few days. She had a casual sex relationship with her friend Nicky Nichols but broke it off due to feelings that she was cheating on her "fiancé" Christopher. It is eventually revealed that Christopher was a man whom she had obsessively stalked and threatened at the same time that she was running a mail-order scam, and the reason she is in prison is that she placed a car bomb under his car. Lorna also gets caught in the middle of Pornstache and Red's drug-smuggling operations. When she is left alone during a driving errand while Miss Rosa is at a chemotherapy appointment, she drives to Christopher's house and breaks in.

While there, she takes a bath wearing his fiancée's wedding veil and falls asleep, waking up just in time to escape before she is seen. Christopher suspects her for the break-in and later visits the prison to confront and threaten her, finally shattering her obsessive delusions. At the end of the second season, Lorna allows Rosa to steal the van after finding out that she only had a few weeks to live so that she would not die in prison. In the third season, she becomes depressed and lonely after being relieved of her duties as the van driver and losing Nicky, who was sent to Maximum Security at the beginning of the season. To cope, as well as to get extra commissary money, she decides to start writing to multiple men. After visiting with several different men, she starts a relationship with a man named Vince "Vinny" Muccio. As the two get closer, Lorna manipulates Vince into gathering some of his friends and beating Christopher up. Eventually, Lorna and Vince get married in the prison's visitor center and they consummate their marriage in the visitor's snack room. In the fourth season, Lorna is angered when nobody has any reaction to the news that she is married. It is soon pointed out to her that she actually knows almost nothing about her new husband, and she realizes that it may well be true when Alex asks her what his favorite color is and she cannot answer. She later discovers while talking to Vinny on the phone that he lives with his parents, but is not perturbed. Nevertheless, she begins to annoy and disturb the inmates with her open phone sex conversations, including in the visiting room. She is overjoyed at Nicky's return from max but declines when Nicky tries to convince her to restart their relationship. In the later part of the season, she begins to suspect that Vinny is cheating on her with her sister, despite her having asked her sister to go and visit him herself, and ends up angrily accusing both of infidelity. Subsequently, when Red pairs her with Nicky to search the grounds in order to keep them busy, she has to fend Nicky off once again, but eventually confesses through tears that she is destroying her relationship and is powerless to stop herself.

In Season 5 she takes refuge in the pharmacy with Nicky and helps distribute medicine to the inmates. She is shown to be visibly shaken when Nicky confesses her love for Lorna to Brook Soso. She eventually convinces Nicky to have sex with her out of horniness, which she later blames on pregnancy hormones, despite not having taken a pregnancy test. She tells Vince, who is waiting in the crowd outside the prison, that she is pregnant, but he immediately gets into his car and drives away. With both Nicky and Vince gone, Lorna enters into a state of denial and refuses to give any other inmates medicine and tries to convince them that they don't need it. She finally takes 12 pregnancy tests to confirm that she is pregnant, but has to be convinced by Nicky that the tests are all actually positive and not just another delusion. At the end of the season, she surrenders with the majority of the inmates and her fate is left unknown. In the sixth season, it is revealed that she ended up in D Block at max, and she is reunited with Nicky. Lorna is back together with Vince and constantly talks about being pregnant, and she eventually gets wrapped up in the war between C Block and D Block. She becomes convinced to participate in the plan to attack C Block during the kickball game but then decides to remain out of the war and in a closet with Nicky. However, Nicky is forced to go outside and play kickball, leaving her in the closet.

During the game, Lorna goes into premature labor. At the beginning of the seventh season, it is revealed that Lorna gave birth to her son Sterling, but he later died due to pneumonia. Vinny tells Lorna that Sterling died, but she becomes delusional and insists that he is still alive while telling her friends Vinny is keeping their son away from her. She then starts saving pictures of infants she is finding on a search engine and posts them on social media accounts she created for Sterling while claiming that those are pictures of her son. Eventually, Sterling's social media accounts are taken down, causing her to panic. When she tells Vinny about it during a visit he reveals that he reported the accounts as fraudulent and he then tells Lorna he wants a divorce due to her inability to accept Sterling's death.

=== Gloria Mendoza ===
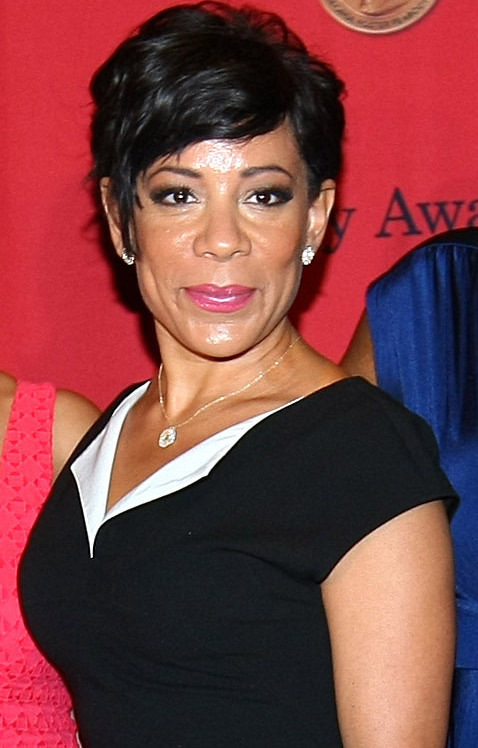
Selenis Leyva

Gloria Mendoza (played by Selenis Leyva) – Red's opposite number among the Hispanic and Latina inmates, though with no organized crime connections. She is a mother of two boys. She organizes domino games and looks out for the other inmates, either by giving advice or by performing Santería spells (which she refers to as "Catholic plus") for them. She is often critical of Daya's inability to speak Spanish but still accepts her as one of her own. Despite this, she tricks Daya into drinking a concoction that makes her feel sick, at the request of Aleida. When Red is put under investigation after her smuggling operation's cover is blown, Gloria becomes the new head cook, and some inmates prefer her breakfast cooking. Red tries to sabotage Gloria's kitchen operations, but fails to discourage her replacement. At the end of the first season, it is shown that Gloria is starving out Red in a similar way that Red did to Piper at the beginning of the series.

During the second season, her backstory reveals that she was a frequent victim of domestic abuse. As she was planning to run from her abusive boyfriend, she was arrested for fraud for allowing customers to exchange food stamps for money at the store she ran and keeping some of the money for herself. She is shown as compassionate and easily susceptible to other's feelings, as she forgave her boyfriend repeatedly, and fell for Vee's charms at the beginning of the season. Upon learning that Norma is plotting to poison Vee, Gloria convinces her to use Santeria to get back at her instead. She also spends the initial part of the season competing with Aleida to be a motherly figure to Daya, but after embarrassing her in front of Bennett, she realizes that it is a job they both do well.

In the third season, she is upset after discovering that her son is becoming disrespectful and is failing his classes. She demands that he comes to visit with his homework every week and asks Sophia to allow him to ride with her son when he is doing his weekly visits. After Sophia cuts off the relationship in response to what she saw as Gloria's son being a bad influence, the two have a confrontation in the bathroom, resulting in Sophia pushing Gloria to the ground. Gloria quits working in the kitchen and later feels guilty because Aleida started spreading rumors about Sophia that caused her to get attacked in her hair salon and put in the SHU allegedly for her own safety. In the fourth season, she is shown working with Sister Jane Ingalls to get Sophia out of SHU. When Sophia returns, Gloria attempts to make amends with her. Before Aleida is released from prison, she tells Gloria to be a mother figure to Daya and to keep her out of trouble. Gloria is clearly concerned when Daya begins spending time with Maria's crew.

At the beginning of the fifth season, she becomes extremely concerned about Daya after she shoots Humphrey in the leg, and attempts to keep him alive at all costs so Daya does not face a murder charge. She takes the gun from Daya, but ends up losing the gun to Angie after dropping it on the ground. She supports Daya when she decides to surrender for shooting Humphrey, and ends up getting into an intense argument with Aleida over it. When Frieda reveals her secret bunker in the prison, she joins her down there, but ends up leaving after she receives text messages about her son being in the hospital. After being given a tip from Caputo to call for help from his office, she is told by MCC that if she gets the hostages out, they will ensure that she is able to see her son. Maria finds out about her plan, but while she does not reveal it to any of the other prisoners, Maria ends up leading the hostages out of a hole in the fence to take credit for releasing them while Gloria is taken prisoner for releasing the guards. At the end of the season, after finding out that her son survived surgery, she returned to Frieda's bunker while the riot team is taking back control of the prison.

=== Cindy "Black Cindy" Hayes ===
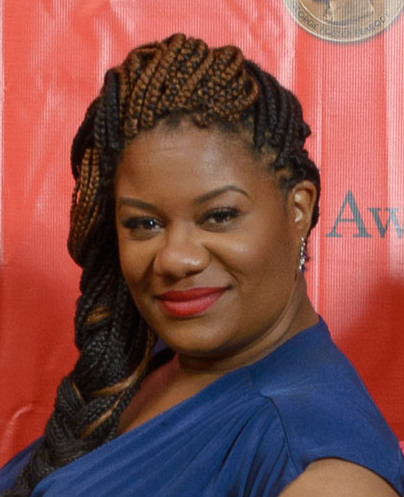
Adrienne C. Moore

Cindy "Black Cindy" Hayes (played by Adrienne C. Moore) – A bubbly, laid-back and perpetually cheerful inmate, "Black" Cindy (so nicknamed to distinguish her from another inmate named Cindy—rarely seen or mentioned—who is white) is seen often with the other black inmates. During Taystee's time on the outside, she is seen more frequently joking around with Poussey. Her back story is explained more in the second season, where it is revealed that she worked for the TSA and occasionally stole items from the luggage of travelers. It is shown that she also had a nine-year-old daughter named Monica who was raised by her mother under the pretense that Cindy was her older sister. She is shown to shirk her responsibilities; in one instance, she took her daughter out for ice cream, only to leave her in the car for hours after she spontaneously decided to hang out with some friends. In the third season, she decides to pretend to be Jewish as a response to the inferior food quality resulting from the budget cuts so she can get better tasting kosher meals. After the prison brings in a rabbi to discover who is really Jewish and ends up being outed as a faker, she decides to convert for real and completes her conversion by performing a ritual immersion, using the lake behind the prison as a mikveh. In the beginning of the fourth season, she gets involved in an escalating turf war with her new inmate, Alison Abdullah, who is an observant Muslim, during which the two frequently trade barbs about their respective religions. However, they begin to get along and Abdullah joins Cindy's group of friends.

=== Joseph "Joe" Salvatore Caputo ===
Joseph "Joe" Salvatore Caputo (played by Nick Sandow) – One of the administrative officials in the prison. Caputo is initially portrayed as a sleazy character who believes in keeping the inmates dehumanized and who masturbates in his office immediately after his first encounter with Piper. Later, it becomes clear that he genuinely seeks to rehabilitate the inmates and run the prison properly and ethically. He does not tolerate corruption, inefficiency, and sexual exploitation, later telling Bennett while berating him for impregnating Daya that he masturbates to control any urges to sleep with one of the inmates. It is shown through flashbacks in the third season that Caputo's desire to do the right thing has always been met with ingratitude and bad results for him. Prior to working at the prison, he quit his band to raise his girlfriend's daughter – who was conceived with one of his bandmates while they were separated – only for them to become successful while he got stuck in a low-paid job in the prison service, and his wife left him for her daughter's father. Throughout the first season, Caputo appeared to have romantic feelings for the new recruit to the staff, Susan Fischer. However, when she did not return the feelings, Caputo became upset and fired her during an argument. He is easily the most competent of the prison staff, being more than capable of dealing with crises without being appeasing or oppressive – on one occasion, upon finding out that there is a hunger strike in the prison, he goes to the strikers directly and tells them straight that most of their demands are either unreasonable or are being resolved independently, without then sending them to the SHU. In addition, he is unafraid to challenge people who are being unreasonable, routinely lashing out at Figueroa for her austere methods, and Healy for his lesbian witch hunt. He also plays bass guitar in a band called "Side Boob," and attempts to grow plants as a therapeutic hobby. Caputo is also seen to be very ambitious, and desired to move up the ladder to eventually become warden. When Piper finds evidence of Figueroa embezzling funds from the prison, Caputo uses it to force her resignation and he becomes the new assistant warden.

Although Caputo wished to be seen as a more providing and kinder warden than his predecessor, he soon learned that Litchfield was to close with the prisoners transferred and all the staff fired. Desperate to save his job and those of his co-workers, he convinces Figueroa to give him details on how to make Litchfield desirable to the Management & Correction Corporation, a private investor. This works, and although Litchfield is saved, Caputo became a figurehead who reported to Danny Pearson, the son of one of MCC's senior executives, and is forced to endure severe budget cuts like low-quality pre-packaged food and his staff being reduced to part-time while under-qualified staff with minimum training were brought in to fill the void, resulting in many serious mistakes. Around this time, Caputo begins an affair with Figueroa in order to relieve his self-hate at all the compromises he is being forced to make. Due to the incumbent staff angry at their hours and wages being cut as well as being expelled from their union due to working for a private company, Caputo suggests they form their own union and agrees to lead it. When Sophia is seriously assaulted by other inmates while the CO on duty runs off in a panic, she threatens the prison with a lawsuit. As a result, Sophia is taken into "protective custody," which is actually just her being thrown into isolation as punishment for her threat to sue. Caputo and Pearson argue with the latter's father against this unfair treatment, and his frustration results in Pearson quitting. Later, while in bed with Figueroa, she reminds him that his constant efforts to help others have only ever held him back, and tells him that he should start looking after his own interests more – that, instead of fighting for his employees, none of whom have shown him any gratitude for his efforts, he should instead try and advance his own interests within the corporation. In response, Caputo filled Pearson's position and immediately broke up the union causing most of the older, more experienced staff to immediately go on strike.

At the beginning of the fourth season, he is forced to call for reinforcements from max to replace the guards that walked out while the prisoners escaped and started playing in the lake outside of the prison. During the crisis, he is informed that Judy King arrived and is instructed to give her special treatment by MCC, partly to ensure she is given no opportunity to sue the prison after her release, and partly to create leverage over her in the event that she decides to do so. He appoints Desi Piscatella, one of the reinforcements that came from max during the strike, as the new captain of the guards after the crisis is over. During a meeting at MCC, he recommends using veterans to supplement personnel and to house them near the prison in the existing housing to save money. He also meets Linda, an executive he starts a relationship with and appoints Taystee as his secretary at Linda's suggestion. He is repeatedly confronted by Crystal, Sophia's wife, and eventually uses a smuggled cell phone to anonymously show proof that Sophia is in the SHU, resulting in her being returned to general population. He proposes to Linda that the prison should offer college classes to the inmates, only to be disappointed when Linda informs him that MCC replaced the common core classes with labor-intensive classes that are just a front to make the inmates do unpaid labor. After Aydin's remains are found in the garden, he orders the guards not to interrogate the inmates and to let the FBI handle the situation when they arrive. Following Caputo's departure, Piscatella promptly ignores his orders and the following morning, he threatens to pull all of his guards if Caputo attempts to suspend any of them for their actions. After Poussey's death, he sends Piscatella home and attempts to convince MCC to call the police. He is ordered to wait until MCC can find a way to relieve the company of any blame for wrongdoing, and then finds out that the company wants to turn Bayley into a scapegoat. Prior to a press conference to announce Poussey's death, he calls her father to inform him of her death. Following this, against orders from MCC, he absolves Bayley of any intentional wrongdoing while neglecting to mention Poussey's name during the press conference, causing the prisoners to riot after Taystee overhears the press conference and spreads the word to the other inmates.

During the fifth season, Caputo is taken hostage along with the other guards after the inmates take over the prison. Taystee forces him to film a statement naming Poussey as the deceased inmate, but he refuses to follow orders to state that she was murdered by Bayley, which resulted in Taystee completing the statement herself. He is locked up with the other guards, and when the guards came up with an escape plan to take place when the inmates were feeding them, he stalled due to Linda being one of the inmates bringing them food. Eventually, he is locked into a Porta-Potty while pleading with whoever could hear him to release him. He sends Gloria to his office so she can call Jack Pearson about getting furlough so she can see her son in the hospital. Later on, he tries to help Taystee during her negotiations with Figueroa, although he was unable to convince her to surrender in exchange for what the state was offering because they claimed that charging Bayley with murder for Poussey's death was not within the state's jurisdiction. Following this, he goes to the operations center outside of the prison, where he learns that the CERT officers are preparing to storm the prison due to Maria releasing the majority of the guards in an attempt to cash in on Gloria's deal with Pearson. After the officers state that they were still missing inmates despite previous sweeps, he informs them about the abandoned pool that Frieda converted into a bunker. He becomes upset upon learning that they were given authorization to use deadly force to capture the remaining inmates.

In the final season, believing Taystee when she tells him that she's innocent of the murder of Piscatella, he investigates, trying to find out what really happened and prove her innocence but is unsuccessful. The series ends with he and Figueroa still together and, unable to have a baby of their own, attempting to adopt a child.

=== Carrie "Big Boo" Black ===
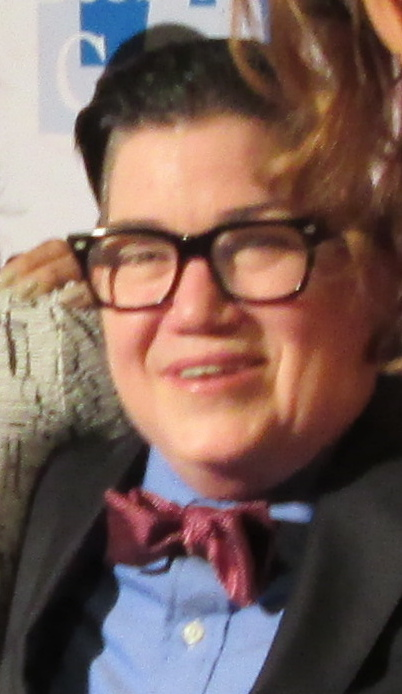
Lea DeLaria

Carrie "Big Boo" Black (played by Lea DeLaria) – A prison inmate and open lesbian, she has had several "wives" during her incarceration. Tricia and Boo have had problems in the past fighting over a girl. She has Piper helping her write a letter for her appeal and takes the missing screwdriver from Piper's bunk unbeknownst to Piper, which she uses to aid in masturbation. She later returns the screwdriver to Piper when Piper becomes stressed over the fact that Tiffany is threatening to kill her. During the first season, Boo is often accompanied by a dog she named "Little Boo." She got rid of the dog by the second season, saying things were getting "weird." It is implied Boo considered using the dog to stimulate herself sexually. She later participates in a competition with Nicky to see who can have sex with the most inmates. Boo has little loyalty to anyone and, trying to ingratiate herself with the powerful Vee, betrays Red by telling Vee about the tunnel. As a result, she is shunned by Red's family, and Vee rejects her for snitching. Afterward, she strikes up an unlikely friendship with Tiffany — which soon develops to be a close bond — and, when Red is hospitalized following an assault by Vee, Boo helps Nicky locate and hide Vee's drug stash. During the third season, she is inspired when she realizes that Tiffany is getting donations from numerous religious groups and decides to pretend to renounce homosexuality in order to get a similar support base. However, when she is speaking to a reverend that openly disparages homosexuals she is unable to continue her ruse and angrily insults him in retaliation.

In flashbacks, it is shown that, as a teenager, her parents — particularly her mother — had strongly disapproved of her tomboyish dress sense and appearance and attempted to force her to be more feminine. By the time she was forty, she had adopted a "butch" self-image which she protected militantly, but at the same time struggled to contain her inner anger and rage at the world brought on by these experiences, and she had become completely estranged from her parents. At one point, in a conversation with Tiffany, she expresses the view that one should not allow one's beliefs to destroy relationships, as she herself holds deep regret and guilt for having never made peace with, or even attempting to say goodbye to her mother before she died. Later in the series, she attempts to console Tiffany after discovering that she was raped by Coates. She comes up with a plan to get revenge by anally raping him with a broomstick but Tiffany is unable to go through with it. She later witnesses Piper framing Stella as revenge for stealing the money from the used panty business and cannot help but be impressed by her ruthless action.

During the fourth season, she continues her friendship with Tiffany, but she becomes angered when Tiffany proposes forgiving Coates for raping her. This continues after the riot, but despite that, she agrees to defend Tiffany in the "inmate court" that took place after she allowed Coates to escape, with Leanne getting her finger shot off in the process. She takes an interest in Linda Ferguson, believing her to be an inmate, and has several sexual encounters with her. However, she looks through Linda's phone and sees pictures of her with Caputo. She attempts to blackmail Linda for $5,000 in exchange for her silence, and when that fails, she outs her to the other prisoners as an MCC executive. When the CERT has the prisoners rounded up, she leads other inmates in repeating Linda's declaration that she is an MCC employee to prevent her from getting away. During the sixth season, she is moved to Ohio and she watches with delight when Linda's hair is cut off moments before the guards realize she is not a prisoner and release her. She makes one more appearance in the series finale when copies of Judy's book are being passed out among the inmates in the Ohio facility.

=== Marisol "Flaca" Gonzales ===
Marisol "Flaca" Gonzales (played by Jackie Cruz) – One of the Hispanic inmates, she is close friends with Maritza. She has a teardrop drawn under one of her eyes as well as eyeliner in the style of Amy Winehouse and bangs in a blunt style; according to Cruz the teardrop is in the wrong location.

She is shown to be rather misinformed, if not totally dim at times, genuinely believing that black people cannot float due to their bone density. This leads to Maritza stating that her head is full of "caca" and Aleida referring to her as "Flacaca." She appears to be a goth, wearing Gothic makeup and being obsessed with such bands as The Smiths and Depeche Mode. She is also somewhat aggressive, getting into a brawl with Taystee over an ice-cream cone. She and Maritza have a very close friendship, and on Valentine's Day in the second season, the two have an intimate conversation about their lack of love in the prison and after playfully telling Maritza she would kiss her and giving her a peck on the lips they end up passionately kissing. After initially laughing at what has just happened, a shocked Flaca becomes upset and begins to cry, while Maritza consoles her. During the third season, Flaca's backstory is revealed as a high-school student that sold fake acid to students. One student ended up believing it so much that he jumped off the roof of the school and ended up nearly dying. Flaca was thus arrested for fraud and endangerment, despite her belief that she did nothing illegal as the blotters were only placebos. At the prison, she becomes a part of Piper's used underwear business. Discovering that Piper was making a large amount of money selling the panties on the outside, she organizes a protest with the other women to get a larger cut of the profits. Piper agrees to her demands but fires her in revenge. Later, she is able to convince Piper to allow her to participate in the business again so that she can use the money to help pay for her mother's lymphoma treatment.

During the fourth season, she left Piper's used panty business and joined Maria's rival business. At one point in the season, she had a discussion with Maritza about having to choose between eating dead flies and a baby mouse in a fictional scenario, and later she had to comfort her after she revealed CO Humphrey forced her to act out the scenario for real by gunpoint. After Poussey's death, she and Maritza overheard Kasey and her gang discuss plans to fight Poussey's old friends and she then started practicing how to react when the media comes to the prison. Following the start of the riot in the fifth season, she and Maritza start a beauty channel on YouTube and are captured while live streaming. The two are escorted out of the prison with multiple fans waiting for them outside, and shortly after they are taken outside she becomes distraught and starts crying when she is separated from Maritza and forced to board a bus without her. While boarding the bus, Maritza tells her that she loves her.

She is moved to max along with the other inmates after the riot at the beginning of the sixth season. She gets assigned to the prison's radio show with Black Cindy. At one point while answering an anonymous letter written by Cindy she reveals that Maritza was sent to a prison she claimed was 1500 miles away (she was actually sent to an Ohio prison) before insulting the author of the letter. At another point, Cindy was replaced by Gloria and after listening to her speak about the Fantasy Inmate game the guards were playing she reveals that the microphone wasn't turned on. She ends the season providing commentary for the kickball game between C and D block with Cindy. During the seventh season, she is picked for a work detail in the kitchen at PolyCon's new immigrant detention facility and to her surprise, she discovers that both Blanca and Maritza were arrested by ICE and detained there after being released from prison. At Maritza's request, she contacts her mother in an attempt to get Maritza's U.S. birth certificate but ends up finding out she doesn't have one because she was actually born in Colombia and isn't a U.S. citizen after all. After Maritza is deported she decides to use her position at the kitchen to help as many detainees she can.

- Cruz stated that Flaca is "a different type of Latina" who is "[m]ore realistic" compared to a hyper-photogenic "sexy, beautiful, Sofia Vergara type, with the accent." Cruz explained, "Maybe the way she was raised might be similar to others, but what she likes is very awesome." According to Cruz, Flaca was originally going to be used to say a few lines in each episode, and that Aleida was supposed to consider Maritza her "daughter" with the two of them being closer together. According to Cruz, the writers liked Cruz's performance and also liked Flaca and Maritza's chemistry. Therefore, they asked for her character to become more prominent. Cruz stated that she is real-life friends with Diane Guerrero, Maritza's actress, and suggested that this may have contributed to the on-screen friendship. Cruz added that in regards to Flaca's background, she had believed "Flaca was a little more gangster, but you can see she's not" and that Flaca "was very sweet, very vulnerable, a good person" who was forced to adopt a tougher persona upon being incarcerated.

=== Maritza Ramos ===
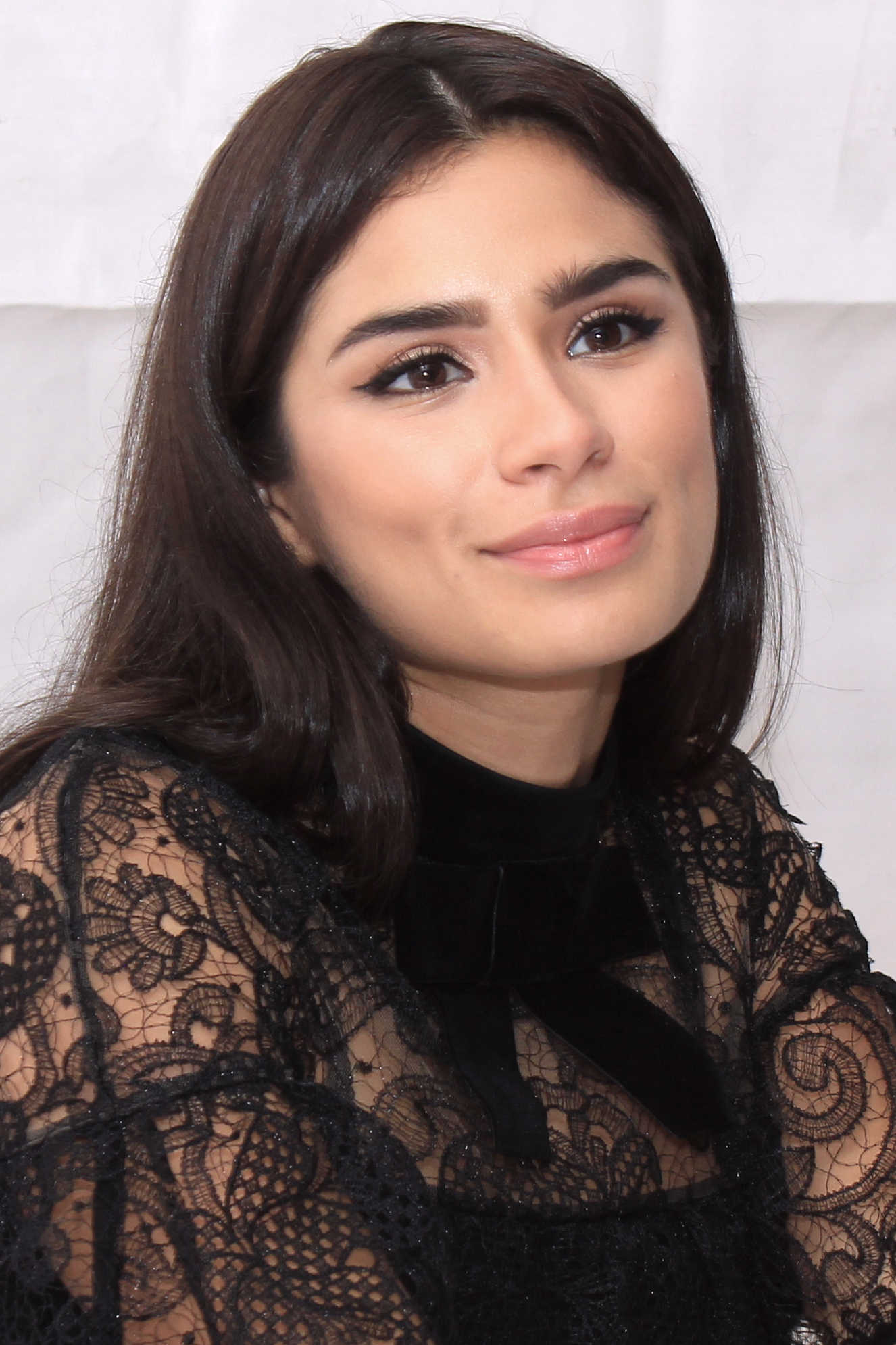
Diane Guerrero

Maritza Ramos (played by Diane Guerrero) – A Colombian-American inmate. In contrast to her rougher, more hardened cellmates, Maritza is quite demure and has a playful, sassy personality. She is often seen with Flaca, with whom she has a rivalry and close friendship; she is generally portrayed as somewhat more intelligent than her friend. On Valentine's Day, she and Flaca are having an intimate conversation in the kitchen, and when Flaca gives her a friendly peck on the lips, the two end up passionately kissing. They initially laugh in shock, before Flaca breaks down in tears, and Maritza consoles her, looking visibly shaken herself. She has a child on the outside.

In the third season, she is distraught when Flaca is accepted to another work detail but reunites with her friend when she joins Piper's used panty business. At the end of the season, she replaces Tiffany as the prison van driver after Tiffany faked a seizure to get away from Officer Coates.

In the fourth season, it is revealed that before her incarceration she was a small-time con artist who worked at an upscale nightclub, wherein she would fill empty bottles of expensive vodka with water, deliberately drop them and then panic about being fired in order to claim the price of the original drink from the people that she convinces had tripped her. One of her victims sees right through her and offers her in to his own, more elaborate confidence trick to steal expensive cars, which involved pretending to be a car saleswoman to entice middle-aged men to go on a test drive, while simultaneously pretending to be their trophy wife to get the keys, and stealing the car once the drive was over. On her first attempt, a salesman gets in the car with them, and when both men grow suspicious, she improvised by pretending to be travel-sick, before getting into the car without them and driving off.

Back in prison, when Maria starts a rival panty-smuggling business to Piper's, she uses Maritza to smuggle the panties out of the prison by hiding them in the wheel arches of the van and transferring them to Maria's cousin when she drops the COs off at their house. She also becomes friendly with McCullough, the CO who supervises her. When the COs spot the smuggler, she pretends he is a gardener and says "Follow me" in Spanish to him, not knowing that CO Humphrey can understand her. He reveals that he knows she's up to something, so she decides to draw the attention of the COs to her contact, threatening him into not returning. Humphrey overhears her talking with Flaca about whether she would rather eat ten dead houseflies or one live baby mouse, so, during a later shift change, he takes her in his house, holds her at gunpoint, and forces her to partake in a real-life version of that choice. Maritza eventually chooses the live baby mouse, and later shares the horror of the experience to Flaca. After Poussey's death, she and Flaca overhear the white supremacist inmates discussing retaliation against Poussey's friends, following this, the two decide to practice how to react to the press if they are interviewed.

During the uprising at the end of the season, she sees Humphrey attempting to unholster a gun, and she pushes him to the ground before he can use it. Following the start of the riot, Maritza and Flaca obtain smartphones, and begin to use them to film vlog posts detailing their makeup regime within the confines of the prison system, something that gradually earns them a following on YouTube which, by the time the riot comes to an end, has become big enough that many of their fans have crowded outside the prison to wave banners in support and in the hope of seeing them when the riot breaks up. As the CERT officers storm the prison, Maritza and Flaca film their last video, and refuse to co-operate with the officers. One of them fires a pepper bullet and blinds Maritza just long enough to restrain her.

Outside, as the inmates are being loaded onto their buses, Maritza is stopped from getting on the same bus Flaca was getting on. Distraught at being separated from her friend, she shouts to her that she loves her. While Maritza does not appear in the sixth season, Flaca mentions on her prison radio show with Cindy that she was sent to a prison 1500 miles away while responding to Cindy's anonymous letter.

Maritza reappears in the seventh season at a nightclub in New York while on parole. She wins a dancing contest at the club, which causes her to get noticed by some NBA players. After sleeping with one of them, he offers to fly her to Los Angeles for a weekend, but she declines due to her friend reminding her that her parole prohibits her from leaving the state. While out at another night club, she is arrested in an ICE raid due to her not having any identification on her proving she is a U.S. citizen and is detained at the PolyCon immigration detention facility with Blanca. Borrowing money from Blanca, she buys a phone card to call a lawyer but her card runs out of money before she can give them any useful information. She reunites with Flaca when Flaca is chosen for a cooking detail with the immigrant detainees and asks her to contact her mother for her U.S. birth certificate. Unknown to Maritza, her mother informs Flaca that she was actually born in Colombia, and is not a U.S. citizen after all. Gloria gives her a toll-free number she can use to contact a pro bono immigration lawyer and she gives the number to the other detainees despite threats that the facility can shut the phones down to stop them from calling, which is noticed by two ICE agents. Despite her attempts to get help from a lawyer, she is eventually given orders for deportation and is last seen being put on a chartered aircraft to be deported along with several other migrants.

=== Aleida Diaz ===
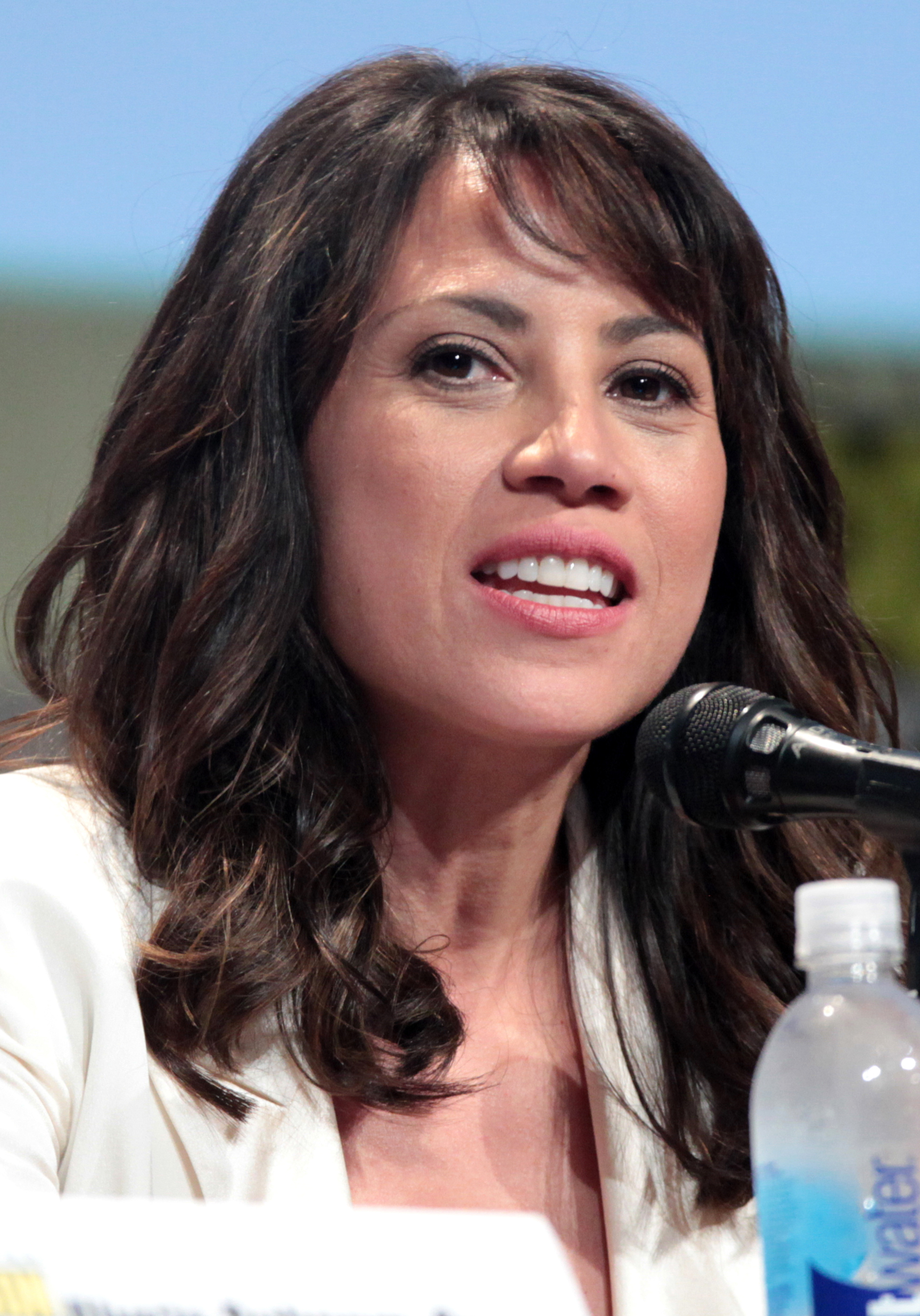
Elizabeth Rodriguez

Aleida Diaz (played by Elizabeth Rodriguez) – Daya's mother. She was incarcerated for helping her boyfriend Cesar with his drug dealing business and taking the blame for him. In flashbacks, it is shown that she had little concern for her children and was obsessed with her boyfriend. She says during a visitation that she is upset that he will not visit her. She treats Daya rudely in the prison, and goes so far as to attempt to seduce Bennett to make Daya angry. She later shows a softer side and advises Daya to have her baby, even going so far as to concoct a plan to allow Bennett to keep his job. She also finds herself competing with Gloria to care for Daya during the more difficult times of her pregnancy, finally forcing her to take on a maternal role in her daughter's life. She has high status among the other Hispanic inmates. During the second season, she battles with Gloria to be a mother to Daya, and manipulates Bennett to bring in contraband from the outside hidden in his prosthetic leg. During the third season, she attempts to convince Daya to give her unborn child to Pornstache's mother Delia so that she would have a better life and to get a monthly payment from her. Later, she decides that it would be better for Daya to keep her baby and tells Delia that Daya's baby died during childbirth while in reality Cesar picked up the child. Despite this, her cruel and vindictive side is shown when she spreads deliberately untrue and transphobic rumors about Sophia to the other inmates in response to a fight between her and Gloria, resulting in Sophia being attacked by the other inmates, something which weighs heavily on Gloria's conscience. During the fourth season, Aleida is informed that she is eligible for parole and she asks Gloria to watch over Daya after her release. After she is released, she is picked up by Cesar's girlfriend Margarita. While in a restaurant, Margarita tells her that Cesar got her pregnant, and after becoming upset at the revelation, she yells at a man she believes was profiling her. She gets into an argument with Margarita in a clothing store after finding out that she was not planning to stay faithful to Cesar while he was in prison, and walks out on her. Later that day, after finding out that her cousin Jazmina spent her money sock on bail and an ER visit, she goes back to Margarita's apartment and states that she has nowhere else to go. At the end of the season, she is watching the press conference announcing the death of an inmate with Margarita, and becomes concerned for Daya's well-being since Caputo did not mention the deceased inmate's name on the air.

After being released from prison, Aleida struggles to find employment, due to her criminal record and lack of qualifications. When the riot breaks out, Aleida appears in several disastrous TV interviews. Eventually, she does an alongside Judy King, and angrily lashes out at her, revealing the special treatment King received in prison. However, she is horrified when King reveals that one of the guards, Thomas Humphrey, was shot and, while she does not remember the shooter's name, Aleida realises she's describing Daya. She hysterically telephones her daughter, and when Daya explains what happened, Aleida demands that she lie, and say that Humphrey threatened her. Finally fed up of her mother's controlling treatment of her, Daya hangs up on her. When Aleida arrives at the prison, she is horrified to see that Daya has surrendered herself to the authorities.

In season 6, still struggling to find work, Aleida eventually resorts to joining "Nutri Life," a Multi-level marketing company based on Herbalife Nutrition, hawking nutritional supplements. She visits her children in foster care, and discovers that only her youngest daughter wants anything to do with her, as her teenage children all remember life under her controlling hand. Determined to get her children out of foster care, and facing the threat of eviction, Aleida begins selling the product outside the prison. This leads to her dating Rick Hopper, the captain of the guards at Max, who starts buying large amounts of protein shake from her. When Daya approaches her to open a drug smuggling route into the prison, Aleida is initially furious, but relents when she faces eviction and has to move in with Hopper. Upon discovering what she is doing, Hopper eventually agrees to help Aleida smuggle more in. Later, when visiting Daya, Aleida is horrified to discover she is addicted to the heroin she has been smuggling in, but realises that she has no other choice but to keep smuggling.

During the final season, she lands back in jail after finding her other daughter Eva with her older boyfriend as he's snorting cocaine, then brutally assaulting him and smashing the window of what she thought was his car. After going back to prison, Hopper is fired after they are caught having sex by the warden and several guards. She then attacks and tries to kill Daya upon learning that Daya had gotten Eva involved in her drug smuggling.

=== Poussey Washington ===
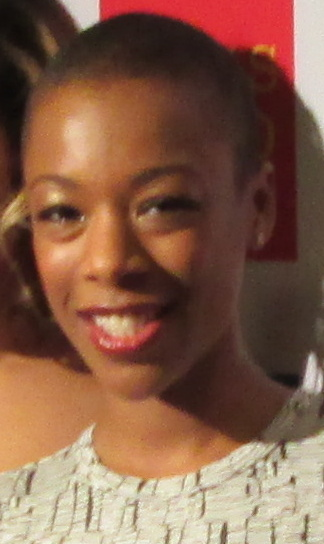
Samira Wiley

Poussey Washington (played by Samira Wiley) – An often good-natured and joking inmate, who is best friends with Taystee. During the first-season finale, she is revealed to have a great singing voice, and performs an improvised rendition of Amazing Grace. Flashbacks during the second season revealed that she is a military brat and that her father James, who was an officer in the United States Army, was stationed at United States Army Garrison Hohenfels, Germany with her. While in Germany, she had a sexual relationship with Franziska Mertensacker, the daughter of her father's German superior officer Jürgen Mertensacker. One evening while Poussey and Franziska were having sex in Franziska's room, Jürgen walked in on them. A short time after being caught Poussey's father received orders to leave Germany, with it being implied that Jürgen had a hand in getting her father reassigned. This led to Poussey trying to kill him before being stopped by her father, who subsequently defended her homosexuality from him. In the present, it is implied that she is in love with Taystee, who does not return her feelings on account of being straight but does make an effort to be gentle with her about this. After failing to get her to market her moonshine, Vee begins to antagonize Poussey, mostly out of jealousy of her closeness to Taystee, and partly out of implied homophobia. She separates Poussey and Taystee, causing a rift in their relationship.

She is one of the few black inmates not to fall for Vee's charms and begins a long campaign to fight her throughout the season. Vee's numerous efforts to force her to back down, including gentle coaxing, threats and even a violent beating from Suzanne are unsuccessful. Eventually, Poussey causes irreparable damage to Vee's tobacco business by smashing up an entire batch of tobacco and pouring bleach on it, and Vee, realizing that no amount of intimidation will stop her, and killing her would be an overreaction, decides to remove her reason for fighting her by ejecting Taystee from the gang. The two later reconcile after a physical fight in the library and work together to turn the other black inmates against Vee. In the third season, she has become obsessed with trying to discover who was stealing her moonshine and starts to set traps to catch what she believed was a squirrel stealing it. Feeling depressed, lonely and in need of a girlfriend, she joins Norma's "cult," although she later ends up leaving when she becomes unsatisfied with them. While in the library to help herself to some of her hooch, she discovers Brook passed out from a drug overdose. Realizing that Brook will be taken to psych if the truth is known, she takes the foils and gets Taystee and Suzanne instead of the CO's. On Taystee's recommendation, they induce vomiting to purge the medication and try to keep Brook from falling asleep at breakfast the next morning. Once Brook has recovered, the African American gang welcomes her into their circle of friends. Poussey later confronts Norma's cult for the way they treated Brook and threatens Leanne.

During the fourth season, her relationship with Brook becomes romantic and she becomes excited at the prospect of meeting Judy King, the cooking show host Poussey was a big fan of who was sent to Litchfield for tax fraud. After several awkward moments between them, Poussey finally sits down with Judy in the cafeteria due to Brook arranging a meeting between them, only to discover that Brook had said numerous racist things about Poussey's personal life when describing her to Judy, including telling her that Poussey's mother was a crack addict. Eventually, Poussey accepts Brook's apology, the two begin anew, and it soon becomes clear that they have fallen in love. Poussey later finds herself helping Judy after her friends were angry about a racist puppet show that Judy filmed in the 80s, that ended up being leaked on YouTube. Judy later offers Poussey a job once she gets out of prison, ensuring she will have something to look forward to. During a protest in the cafeteria, Poussey is caught in a scuffle with Officer Bayley, who tries to restrain her while fighting off an erratic Suzanne by pressing her into the ground and putting his knee over her. Unable to breathe in this position, Poussey dies of asphyxiation, shocking the other inmates and leaving Bayley traumatized. Due to MCC trying to remove liability from the company for her death, they order Caputo not to call the police until they can find a way to make the incident look like Poussey's fault, before deciding to switch blame to Bayley and portray him as a rogue guard when they have difficulty conjuring up such an image of her, as she came from a respectable family, her charge was for a non-violent offense, and she was a model inmate. As a result, her body stays in the cafeteria overnight and is not removed until the following afternoon.

Following her death, Poussey is featured in several flashbacks. She first appears in a series of flashbacks at the end of the fourth season shortly after her death, which chronicled her spending the day in New York with her friends by showing her riding a bus into New York, before going into a nightclub and getting her phone stolen. After chasing and failing to catch the phone thief, she gets lost and after being dismissed by multiple people she is taken to an alternative club by two people she met before she got back in touch with her friends. She then rides a subway towards her friends' location before catching a ride the rest of the way with some men dressed as monks for Improv Everywhere riding bicycles. While smoking marijuana with one of them, she tells him that she lost her chance to go to West Point after her incident with Franziska's father in Germany and that she was planning to move to Amsterdam in a few weeks. She appears in another flashback during the riot showing her first meeting with Taystee in the prison library, and the two joke around with each other before becoming friends. In the final flashback during the seventh season, she is speaking to and joking around with Taystee over the phone during the short period of time Taystee was out on probation during the first season. At the end of the seventh season, Taystee and Judy start the Poussey Washington Fund in her honor to provide microloans to inmates after they are released from prison.

- She was named after the town of Poussay in Northeastern France, where her father was stationed when she was born, and often finds herself on the receiving end of mockery by the other inmates because of its alternative pronunciation.
- Reviewer Joanna Robinson commented that Poussey's death was inspired by that of Eric Garner. Reviewer Crystal Bell likened Poussey's death to the deaths of Sandra Bland and Michael Brown, because of the following details: Caputo did not say Poussey's name during the press conference, and her body was left on the cafeteria floor for almost an entire day, respectively.
- Prior to production on the fourth season began, Kohan and the writers informed Wiley that her character was going to die, but no other cast members knew. Wiley kept this secret during much of the production. According to Wiley, the writers decided Poussey would die because she was a character who was "really loved and people really cared about." According to Lauren Morelli, Kohan stated that a character who would have a bright future outside of prison ought to be chosen since viewers would understand the loss of that person's potential. A character the viewer never expected much from would thus not have the same impact.
- The Poussey Washington Fund introduced in the series finale was announced as a real-life initiative to help formerly incarcerated women after they are released from prison.

=== Maria Ruiz ===
Maria Ruiz (played by Jessica Pimentel) – An inmate of Dominican descent who acts as the Hispanic representative for WAC, and was pregnant at the beginning of the series. When she goes into labor she is taken to a hospital, and later returns to the prison after having her newborn daughter Pepa taken away from her, which elicits sympathy from her fellow inmates. She describes Daya and Aleida's relationship as a "cautionary tale" and states that a minute with them is better than Plan B, as she would never talk to her daughter the way Aleida does toward Daya, or allow her daughter to talk to her the way Daya does Aleida. During the second season, she is visited several times by her stoic, quiet boyfriend Yadriel and her child. When it appears she will be transferred to a prison in Virginia, she begs him to be a good, proactive parent and speak to their child more and later confides in Piper that she is afraid he will be too weak to be faithful during her entire sentence. However, in the second-season finale, she is last seen being visited by her boyfriend and her daughter, happy to see that he is taking a deeper role as a father and apparently plans to stay true to her. During the third season, she is devastated when Yadriel decides not to bring Pepa to the prison anymore, with him saying that he does not want her to think that is normal for her mother to be in prison as she got older.

In the fourth season, it is revealed that her father was a drug dealer who cared for her enormously in the early years of her life. She first met Yadriel when she saw him throwing his drugs into a bush while being pursued by the police, and later returned them to him. Their subsequent relationship angered her father, both because Maria was effectively dating his competition, and because, as an intensely patriotic Dominican, he did not approve of his daughter dating a Mexican. Eventually, after an explosive argument, the two permanently fell out. In the present, Maria began to organize a new gang amongst the other Dominican inmates, in order to fight back against the overt racism of the guards. After attempting to get involved in Piper's business, Maria was angered by her rude response and formed a rival business of her own, which immediately snapped up many of Piper's employees. When Piper blows the whistle on her, Piscatella tells Maria that he will recommend that three to five years are added to her sentence. As a result, Maria responds by having her gang seize Piper, take her to the kitchen and brand her with a swastika, which also serves as retaliation for her accidental creation of the white supremacist gang. Maria's gang start distributing drugs instead and secures her a position of power in the prison. However, as the guards begin to get increasingly violent and draconian, Maria starts to use her power to help protect and rally the other inmates. Upon the discovery of Aydin's body, she is separated from the other inmates, along with Ouija and Blanca, for further questioning. She is initially amused by Officer Humphrey's prank on Kasey Sankey but is shocked when he then escalates it into a fight between Suzanne and Maureen Kukudio. When Suzanne becomes unhinged and almost beats Maureen to death, Maria finally has enough and, with Ouija's help, manages to pull Suzanne off Maureen and comforts her.

During the fifth season, Maria takes advantage of the prison riot to strengthen her gang's position. She offers Daya guidance in handling her newfound status, due to her being the one with the gun, but continues to suggest she give it to her. She also organizes a meeting of all the inmates with the intended purpose of humiliating and degrading the guards that have been taken hostage. However, after a conversation with Caputo, Maria discovers that, contrary to her own understanding, Piscatella could not unilaterally extend her sentence, that he never got a chance to make his recommendation to extend her sentence before the riot began, and even if he had, she would have had to personally attend a court hearing before any extension could be made. With the realization that her sentence was not extended, Maria abandons the other rioters and joins Piper and Alex's riot abstention crew to stay out of trouble. Upon learning that Gloria had made a deal with MCC to get furlough in return for releasing the hostages, Maria betrays her confidence and releases them herself in hopes that she would get time taken off of her sentence. Initially outraged after being told by Nita Reddy that MCC does not have the authority to reduce her sentence, she gains some hope after Nita promised her that she would see what she could do. A short time later, she was allowed an outside visit with Yadriel and Pepa while CERT was clearing out the prison.

Following the events of the previous season, she is transferred to max and was investigated as one of the suspects for planning and starting the riot. She runs into Gloria during a recreation period and Gloria attacks her for revenge after her betrayal during the riot. COs Garza and Hellman broke them up and then took them to the shower to spray them with a water hose. They then forced her and Gloria to kiss each other in front of them for their enjoyment, while claiming that it was to make sure that there was no more animosity between them. Throughout the season, she is dealing with her interrogations as a leader of the riot and faces her sentence being extended by ten years. She has a run-in with CO McCullough during a cell shakedown, and after Maria triggers her with her attitude McCullough slaps her. Later on, while cleaning the bathroom, her head is pushed into the toilet from behind, and she is taken to Psych due to it being a suspected suicide attempt. Deciding to take a different path than what she was previously doing, she joins a prayer group. During a session, she was selected to lead a prayer and after completing it fellow group member Beth Hoefler confessed to pushing her head into the toilet. Maria becomes enraged and compares the attack to Beth's murder of her children, but she does not retaliate against her and instead leaves the group. At the end of the season, she tries to prevent the planned cell block war during the kickball game from starting by asking McCullough to force the cell blocks to mix their team members together. Hesitant at first, McCullough eventually complies and the women end up completing the game without fighting.

- Maria lived with Yadriel after her family disowned her for associating with him. According to Pimentel, Maria originally "kept her head down, did her work and didn't get too involved." While she initially had visits with her child, those were taken away when she became "a gangster with an -er."

=== Blanca Flores ===
Blanca Flores (played by Laura Gómez) – A Dominican inmate. The other inmates thought she was insane, as she appeared to have animated conversations in Spanish with the Devil while inside a restroom stall. Piper later discovered that Blanca is actually of sound mind, and had actually been speaking to her boyfriend, "Diablo", with a cell phone that she had hidden behind a tile in the stall while feigning madness so nobody would suspect anything. Upon discovering the phone is missing, however, her grief and anger lead to a violent tantrum that is mistaken for a breakdown, and she is taken away to psych. She has finally returned by the second season and stopped pretending to be insane, revealing herself to be plain-speaking, blunt and low key, and later attempts to blackmail Bennett into getting her a new phone. During the third season, against Gloria's orders, she attempts the test which will get her into the new work detail and is forced to put up with Flaca's constant pestering and fidgeting. Later, she is embarrassed when Flaca reveals her participation to Gloria in anger.

During the fourth season, she joins Maria's Dominican gang. When the guards stated frisking the Latino inmates for contraband, she discovers that the guards would not frisk her if she stank, and as a result, the other Latina inmates would follow suit. Officer Stratman orders her to bathe, and when she refused he ordered her to stand on a cafeteria table for several days. During flashbacks, she was working as a carer for Millie, an old woman, who misread her name as "Bianca" and continued to address her by that name. While working for Millie, she met her boyfriend Diablo, who was working as Millie's gardener. After their relationship started to grow, Millie fired Diablo, stating that she thought he was a distraction for Blanca. Sometime after Diablo was fired, Blanca had sex with him while Millie was in the same room watching helplessly. At the end of the season, she represented the Latina inmates in expressing condolences for Poussey's death to the black inmates. Throughout most of the fifth season, she teams up with Red to try and take down Piscatella by exposing the details of reports that he murdered an inmate at the male prison he worked at before transferring to Litchfield. The two devise a plan to lure Piscatella into the prison during the riot to try and torture information out of him but she is caught and subdued by him and held hostage along with Nicky, Big Boo, Piper, and Alex. She and the rest of the group are forced to watch Piscatella physically and emotionally torture Red but are saved by Frieda and the rest of the women hiding in the abandoned swimming pool. In the last scene of the season, she is seen with the remaining prisoners still inside the hideout as the CERT officers raid the building and blow the entrance to the hidden bunker.

In the sixth season, Blanca is held in Max alongside the other ten inmates who were in the bunker. Wanting to protect herself and ensure that Maria is held as a riot instigator rather than herself, Gloria convinces Blanca through coded prayer to name her in her interview. She complies, thinking this will be the only way to protect herself. The agents investigating initially consider ruling her out as a suspected instigator, as there is little evidence of her playing an active role in the riot, but when some information is discovered on her file, they change their mind. As a result, Blanca is also held as one of the three instigators, but unlike Red and Maria, her sentence is not extended, for reasons that are not yet clear. Despite her relief, she becomes worried after visiting the prison gynecologist, as she realizes that her body clock is running out, and she wants nothing more than to have a child. Nicky offers to help Blanca artificially inseminate with a makeshift syringe, and some of Diablo's sperm which Daya helps to smuggle in, though the attempt results in her being beaten up by her wing. The insemination fails, but Blanca is going to be released early, which would allow her to try again with Diablo in person. She excitedly tells Diablo, and he tells her he will see her the next day. The next day, however, Blanca is led down a different corridor than Piper and Sophia and instead of getting released she is handed over to ICE for possible deportation.

=== Joel Luschek ===
Joel Luschek (played by Matt Peters) – The sarcastic, uncaring, and barely competent young prison guard who runs the electrical shop. He displays blatant racism, and generally does not care what the women in the shop do as long as they leave him alone, though he is good friends with Nicky. His method of teaching repairs tends to consist of handing his inmates a printed manual for the broken appliance and giving them a few minutes to read before sending them off. He buys a new screwdriver and replaces it in the tool crib to cover up his mistake in failing to properly train Janae, thus ending the search for the missing screwdriver, and endangering the prison population by allowing a dangerous object to remain at large.

During the second season, he enters a relationship with fellow staff member Fischer, but his nonchalant attitude toward her causes it to end.

In the third season, he agrees to help Nicky smuggle heroin out of the prison so he can sell it on the outside. Before he can smuggle it out, Angie and Leanne find it and attempt to keep it for themselves. Luschek finds it on them and threatens to kill them if they tell anybody else about it. During a surprise inspection of his shop, drugs are found under his desk and to protect himself he blames Nicky, causing her to be transferred to max.

In the fourth season, new celebrity inmate Judy King turns herself in to Luscheck after the other guards walked out. Striking a friendship with her, he ends up letting Judy know about his guilt for turning Nicky in and getting her sent to max. After receiving multiple letters from Nicky, he visits her at max, and is promptly berated for his actions. Later, he discovers that Judy pulled some strings to get Nicky out of max, and ends up being forced to have sex with Judy as payment. During lockdown, when Luschek is sent to guard Judy, he ends up having a threesome with her and Yoga Jones while high on ecstasy.

=== Frieda Berlin ===
Frieda Berlin (played by Dale Soules) – A blunt, curmudgeonly German American woman who is a member of the "Golden Girls", (the collective nickname of a group of seniors in the prison who befriend Red in the second season) alongside Irma, Jimmy and Taslitz. When the group threatened Gloria's kitchen staff, Frieda mentions that she is in prison for cutting off her husband's penis with a dull knife, demonstrating her tougher edge over the staff, whose crimes are drug and larceny related. Later, when Red rebuilds the prison greenhouse and garden, Frieda assumes primary authority over it, often having to fend off inmates trying to help themselves to the produce. In the fourth season, after finding Aydin's body in her greenhouse, Frieda advises Alex and Lolly to dispose of it by chopping it up into pieces and hiding it in the soil beneath the garden. Seeing that Lolly is becoming extremely erratic, she later tells Red and Alex that she plans to kill her to prevent her from accidentally exposing them, but is prevented from doing so when Red reminds her that doing so will likely lead to her being returned to max, also revealing that Frieda is a former biker. In Officer Bayley's flashback, Bayley and his friends threw eggs at her while driving by her outdoor work detail near the prison after he was fired from his ice cream job.

In the fifth season, after the riot results in the inmates taking over the prison, she used homemade blow darts to shoot Strautman and Blake in the kitchen. Convincing them that the darts were poisoned, she tricks them into releasing them, before forcing them to join the other guards that were being held hostage. Flashbacks from her childhood revealed that Frieda had a very close relationship with her father, a paranoid survivalist who, during the early years of the Cold War, feared that America's tension with the Soviet Union would ultimately escalate into a full-on war. Because of this, he built an underground bunker near their home and would take her on long camping expeditions, during which he would intentionally abandon her in the middle of the woods to teach her how to find her own way home. The survival and resource gathering skills that he taught her throughout her childhood would later come in useful for her in her prison years. Following her father's footsteps, she builds her own bunker in the prison using an abandoned swimming pool, which she used to get peace and quiet, and she had stocked with supplies she has been gathering for several decades. She opens her hidden bunker to fellow inmates fleeing the riot and revealed that she knew guards that worked at Litchfield as far back as the 1970s. Later on, when Piscatella is torturing some of the other inmates, she helps capture him and they hold him hostage until Taystee enters the bunker and grabs Frieda's pistol. After Taystee is talked out of executing Piscatella and he is released, Frieda is standing with the other inmates while waiting for the CERT officers to breach her bunker.

In the sixth season, she is moved to max with the other inmates that were in her bunker. Shortly after arriving, she slit her wrists, stating that she can't be in max, but she was saved and sent to medical. She considered several other methods to try and kill herself until she was transferred to B-Block, the neutral and peaceful block of the prison known as "Florida." Flashbacks from the 80s revealed that prior to her stay in minimum security, she was in max. While there, she used to distribute contraband with Carol Denning, the current leader of C-Block. She betrayed Carol and turned in her contraband to the warden in exchange for a transfer to minimum security while the Denning sisters got extra time. On her way to B-Block, Carol spots Frieda after a CO is removing an unruly inmate. While in Florida, she was afraid that Carol, now knowing that she is back in max, would try to kill her for revenge. For her protection, she requested that Suzanne becomes her roommate because she felt Suzanne wouldn't kill her and she cut herself and stated that another inmate she suspected was paid to kill her did it so she would be taken away.

=== Natalie Figueroa ===
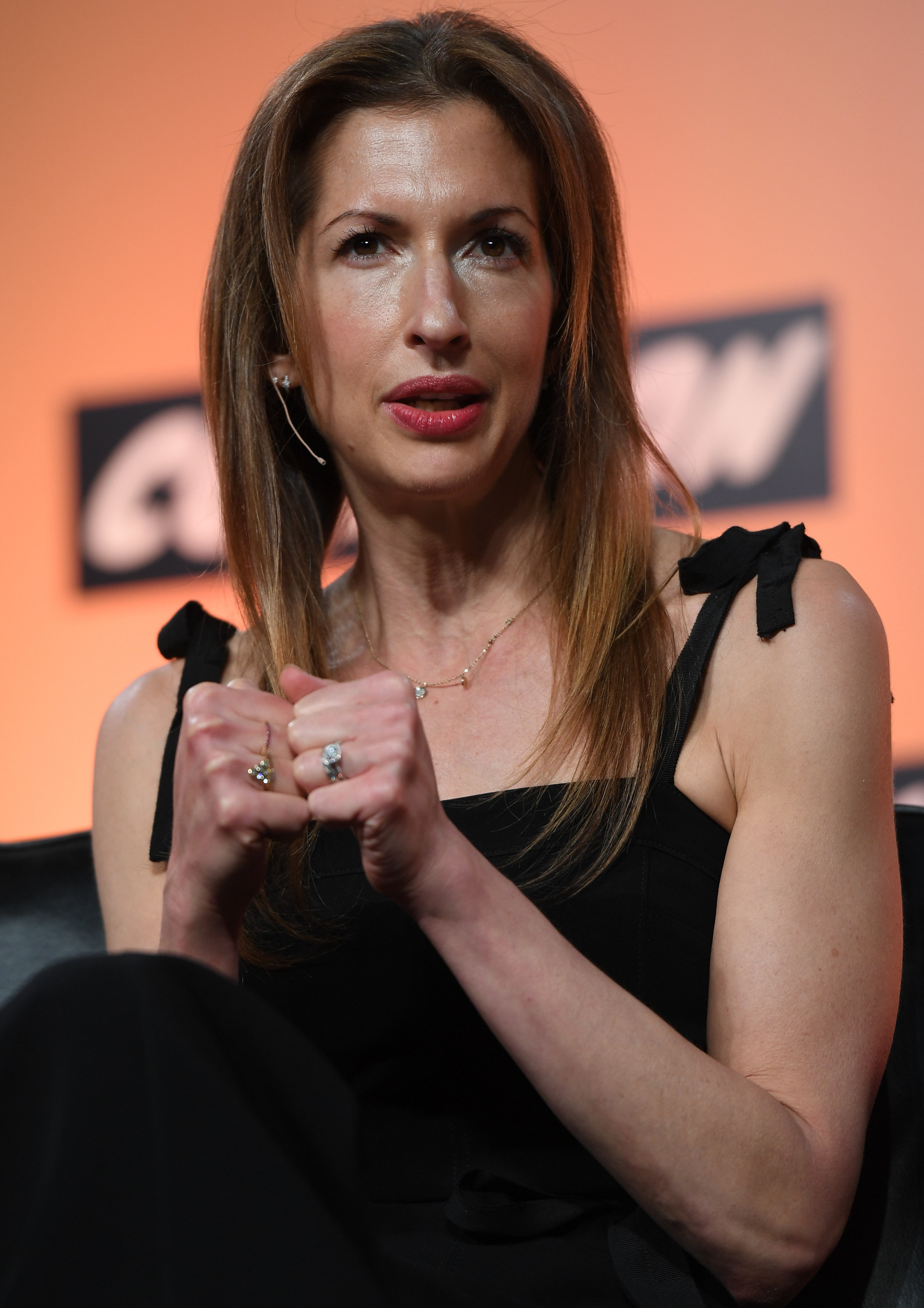
Alysia Reiner

Natalie "Fig" Figueroa (played by Alysia Reiner) – The former corrupt executive assistant to the warden. At the beginning of the series, Figueroa claims to be a women's advocate for the prisoners, but is generally unconcerned with them and refuses to get involved in their problems. Arrogant and condescending, she puts on a tough facade to disguise her own insecurities and somewhat fragile personality. Sometimes, she shows odd displays of humanity and sensitivity, usually when the rest of the prison staff are being insufferable. Figueroa tries to avoid any scandals or media attention about the goings-on at the prison, and her desire to cover up incidents allows Mendez to get away with his schemes (although it later works in favor of the inmates). She is revealed to have been embezzling funds from the prison's budget for her husband Jason's state senate campaign, a secret which is in danger of being exposed due to the publicity the prison is getting from Larry's articles and radio interview.

She spends the second season a step ahead of Larry and a reporter's hunt, focusing on her husband's campaign to become a state senator and on getting pregnant. She is shown to be particularly uncaring, brought on by the stress of keeping the embezzlement under wraps, and her marriage is generally loveless and lacking physical affection. She is devastated and heartbroken when she sees her husband kissing his male campaign manager Gavin, and she is taken completely by surprise that her husband is a closet homosexual. Shortly after, Caputo confronts her with evidence of her embezzlement. She performs oral sex on him in an attempt to buy his silence, only to find out afterward that Caputo has already given copies of the evidence to the warden. Figueroa manages to avoid being fired or charged, resigning with a commendation for her services by the warden because he didn't want a scandal from the embezzlement and didn't want to make a political enemy of her husband.

During the third season, she has moved to Albany after her husband won his state senate campaign. She helps Caputo by giving him information on a private contractor that would take over the prison when it is being threatened with being closed down. She also begins an affair with him. Near the end of the fourth season, she speaks to Caputo and ends up letting him know that MCC is planning to put even more inmates into the prison after building a new facility to house them. Fig also appears at length as a negotiator for MCC during the riot at Litchfield, where she often is out-matched on facts by Taystee and has a frosty reunion with Caputo. While she is receptive to most of the prisoners' demands, she ends any possibility of making a deal when she hears that CO Humphrey is dead. Unknown to her at the time, Humphrey wasn't actually dead at this point, but he died not long afterward as a result of an inmate-caused stroke.

Following the events of the riot, she becomes the warden of the prison in the sixth season, to the ire of Caputo. Due to her position, she has an uneasy working relationship with Linda, who is now the senior vice president at MCC. Fig and Caputo continue to have casual sex, but when Caputo is being transferred to Missouri he insists on taking her out before he leaves. After Caputo quits, resulting in him no longer going to Missouri, she gets closer with him and their relationship elevates past being casual. At the end of the season, when Caputo crashes the event where the renamed PolyCon Corrections reveals their upcoming immigration detention centers, she tells him that she's only with her husband Jason at the event for show. She then helps him treat his injuries from when Herrmann hit him at the courthouse and consoled him over his grief about Taystee's guilty verdict.

By the beginning of the seventh season, Fig and Caputo have moved in together. Linda transferred her from Litchfield to PolyCon's new immigration detention facility, but she soon realizes that most of the power she had as the warden has been stripped at the detention facility due to restrictions put in place by ICE. As time goes by, she frequently becomes frustrated with the policies put in place by ICE, and she becomes especially upset upon witnessing some underage immigrants inside of an on-site immigration court without parental representation. She and Caputo were planning on trying to have a child together, and she was expecting to start in vitro fertilization treatment to assist her to get pregnant. However, she later found out detainee Santos Chaj was impregnated by one of the coyotes that raped her after they got her into the country because she couldn't pay their entry fee. After being denied permission to take Santos to an abortion clinic she told her doctor she herself was pregnant but didn't want the child so she could get a medical abortion pill to give to Santos, which resulted in her no longer able to get IVF treatment for herself. While the issues at the detention facility were going on, she was also trying to prevent Caputo from engaging with former CO Fischer after Fischer accused him of sexually harassing her during her time as a guard, but Caputo failed to adhere to her advice. At the end of the series, she and Caputo decide to look at children for adoption instead.

== See also ==
- List of Orange Is the New Black episodes
