= Houston Film Critics Society Award for Best Picture =

Annual film award

The Houston Film Critics Society Award for Best Picture is an annual award given by the Houston Film Critics Society.

== Winners ==
=== 2000s ===
Year	Winner and nominees	Director(s)
2007	No Country for Old Men	Joel Coen and Ethan Coen
2007	Atonement	Joe Wright
2007	Into the Wild	Sean Penn
2007	Juno	Jason Reitman
2007	Michael Clayton	Tony Gilroy
2008	The Curious Case of Benjamin Button	David Fincher
2008	Slumdog Millionaire	Danny Boyle
2008	The Dark Knight	Christopher Nolan
2008	Milk	Gus Van Sant
2008	WALL-E	Andrew Stanton
2009	The Hurt Locker	Kathryn Bigelow
2009	(500) Days of Summer	Marc Webb
2009	Avatar	James Cameron
2009	District 9	Neill Blomkamp
2009	Inglourious Basterds	Quentin Tarantino
2009	Invictus	Clint Eastwood
2009	Precious	Lee Daniels
2009	Star Trek	J. J. Abrams
2009	Up	Pete Docter
2009	Up in the Air	Jason Reitman

=== 2010s ===
Year	Winner and nominees	Director(s)
2010	The Social Network	David Fincher
2010	127 Hours	Danny Boyle
2010	Black Swan	Darren Aronofsky
2010	Inception	Christopher Nolan
2010	Kick-Ass	Matthew Vaughn
2010	The Kids Are All Right	Lisa Cholodenko
2010	The King's Speech	Tom Hooper
2010	Toy Story 3	Lee Unkrich
2010	True Grit	Joel Coen and Ethan Coen
2010	Winter's Bone	Debra Granik
2011	The Descendants	Alexander Payne
2011	The Artist	Michel Hazanavicius
2011	Drive	Nicolas Winding Refn
2011	Extremely Loud and Incredibly Close	Stephen Daldry
2011	The Help	Tate Taylor
2011	Midnight in Paris	Woody Allen
2011	Take Shelter	Jeff Nichols
2011	The Tree of Life	Terrence Malick
2011	War Horse	Steven Spielberg
2011	Win Win	Tom McCarthy
2012	Argo	Ben Affleck
2012	Beasts of the Southern Wild	Benh Zeitlin
2012	Cloud Atlas	Tom Tykwer and Lana & Lilly Wachowski
2012	Django Unchained	Quentin Tarantino
2012	Lincoln	Steven Spielberg
2012	Les Misérables	Tom Hooper
2012	The Master	Paul Thomas Anderson
2012	Moonrise Kingdom	Wes Anderson
2012	Silver Linings Playbook	David O. Russell
2012	Zero Dark Thirty	Kathryn Bigelow
2013	12 Years a Slave	Steve McQueen
2013	All Is Lost	J. C. Chandor
2013	American Hustle	David O. Russell
2013	Before Midnight	Richard Linklater
2013	Dallas Buyers Club	Jean-Marc Vallée
2013	Fruitvale Station	Ryan Coogler
2013	Gravity	Alfonso Cuarón
2013	Inside Llewyn Davis	Joel Coen and Ethan Coen
2013	Nebraska	Alexander Payne
2013	Saving Mr. Banks	John Lee Hancock
2014	Boyhood	Richard Linklater
2014	Birdman	Alejandro G. Iñárritu
2014	The Grand Budapest Hotel	Wes Anderson
2014	Guardians of the Galaxy	James Gunn
2014	The Imitation Game	Morten Tyldum
2014	Inherent Vice	Paul Thomas Anderson
2014	A Most Violent Year	J. C. Chandor
2014	Nightcrawler	Dan Gilroy
2014	Selma	Ava DuVernay
2014	Whiplash	Damien Chazelle
2015	Spotlight	Tom McCarthy
2015	The Big Short	Adam McKay
2015	Carol	Alex Garland
2015	Inside Out	Pete Docter and Ronnie del Carmen
2015	Mad Max: Fury Road	George Miller
2015	The Martian	Ridley Scott
2015	The Revenant	Alejandro G. Iñárritu
2015	Room	Lenny Abrahamson
2015	Sicario	Denis Villeneuve
2015	Steve Jobs	Danny Boyle
2016	La La Land	Damien Chazelle
2016	Arrival	Denis Villeneuve
2016	The Handmaiden	Chan-wook Park
2016	Hell or High Water	David Mackenzie
2016	Jackie	Pablo Larraín
2016	Lion	Garth Davis
2016	Manchester by the Sea	Kenneth Lonergan
2016	Moonlight	Barry Jenkins
2016	The Nice Guys	Shane Black
2016	Nocturnal Animals	Tom Ford
2017	Lady Bird	Greta Gerwig
2017	The Big Sick	Michael Showalter
2017	Call Me by Your Name	Luca Guadagnino
2017	Dunkirk	Christopher Nolan
2017	The Florida Project	Sean Baker
2017	Get Out	Jordan Peele
2017	Logan	James Mangold
2017	The Post	Steven Spielberg
2017	The Shape of Water	Guillermo del Toro
2017	Three Billboards Outside Ebbing, Missouri	Martin McDonagh
2018	The Favourite'	Yorgos Lanthimos
2018	Black Panther	Ryan Coogler
2018	BlacKkKlansman	Spike Lee
2018	Eighth Grade	Bo Burnham
2018	First Reformed	Paul Schrader
2018	Green Book	Peter Farrelly
2018	Hereditary	Ari Aster
2018	If Beale Street Could Talk	Barry Jenkins
2018	A Star Is Born	Bradley Cooper
2018	Vice	Adam McKay
2019	Parasite	Bong Joon-ho
2019	1917	Sam Mendes
2019	The Farewell	Lulu Wang
2019	The Irishman	Martin Scorsese
2019	Jojo Rabbit	Taika Waititi
2019	Joker	Todd Phillips
2019	Knives Out	Rian Johnson
2019	Marriage Story	Noah Baumbach
2019	Once Upon a Time in Hollywood	Quentin Tarantino
2019	Uncut Gems	Joshua Safdie and Benjamin Safdie

=== 2020s ===
Year	Winner and nominees	Director(s)
2020	Nomadland	Chloé Zhao
2020	Da 5 Bloods	Spike Lee
2020	The Father	Florian Zeller
2020	Minari	Lee Isaac Chung
2020	Never Rarely Sometimes Always	Eliza Hittman
2020	One Night in Miami...	Regina King
2020	Promising Young Woman	Emerald Fennell
2020	Soul	Pete Docter and Kemp Powers
2020	Sound of Metal	Darius Marder
2020	The Trial of the Chicago 7	Aaron Sorkin
2021	The Power of the Dog	Jane Campion
2021	Belfast	Kenneth Branagh
2021	CODA	Sian Heder
2021	Don't Look Up	Adam McKay
2021	Dune	Denis Villeneuve
2021	King Richard	Reinaldo Marcus Green
2021	Licorice Pizza	Paul Thomas Anderson
2021	Parallel Mothers	Pedro Almodóvar
2021	tick, tick... BOOM!	Lin-Manuel Miranda
2021	The Tragedy of Macbeth	Joel Coen
2022	Everything Everywhere All at Once	Daniel Kwan and Daniel Scheinert
2022	The Banshees of Inisherin	Martin McDonagh
2022	Elvis	Baz Luhrmann
2022	The Fabelmans	Steven Spielberg
2022	Guillermo del Toro’s Pinocchio	Guillermo del Toro
2022	RRR	S. S. Rajamouli
2022	TÁR	Todd Field
2022	Till	Chinonye Chukwu
2022	Top Gun: Maverick	Joseph Kosinski
2022	Women Talking	Sarah Polley
2023	Poor Things	Yorgos Lanthimos
2023	American Fiction	Cord Jefferson
2023	Are You There God? It's Me, Margaret.	Kelly Fremon Craig
2023	Barbie	Greta Gerwig
2023	The Color Purple	Blitz Bazawule
2023	Godzilla Minus One	Takashi Yamazaki
2023	The Holdovers	Alexander Payne
2023	Killers of the Flower Moon	Martin Scorsese
2023	Oppenheimer	Christopher Nolan
2023	Past Lives	Celine Song
2024	Anora	Sean Baker
2024	The Brutalist	Brady Corbet
2024	A Complete Unknown	James Mangold
2024	Conclave	Edward Berger
2024	Dune: Part Two	Denis Villeneuve
2024	Nickel Boys	RaMell Ross
2024	A Real Pain	Jesse Eisenberg
2024	Sing Sing	Greg Kwedar
2024	The Substance	Coralie Fargeat
2024	Wicked	Jon M. Chu
