= Carnegie Mellon School of Drama =

Drama institution in Pittsburgh, Pennsylvania

Coordinates: 40.4437°N 79.9432°W

School of Drama
- Established: 1914; 112 years ago
- Academic affiliations: Carnegie Mellon College of Fine Arts
- Location: Pittsburgh, Pennsylvania, United States
- Website: drama.cmu.edu

The School of Drama is a department-level school within the College of Fine Arts at Carnegie Mellon University, a private university in Pittsburgh, Pennsylvania. It was founded in 1914.

The school's undergraduate BFA programs in acting, musical theatre, directing(on hold), design, dramaturgy, and production technology and management majors are considered to be among the top programs in undergraduate conservatory training. Its MFA offerings in directing, design, dramatic writing, and production and technology management are also considered to be top graduate programs. The School of Drama offers 14-18 events every season on campus, and also presents members of its graduating class in produced showcases in New York City and Los Angeles.

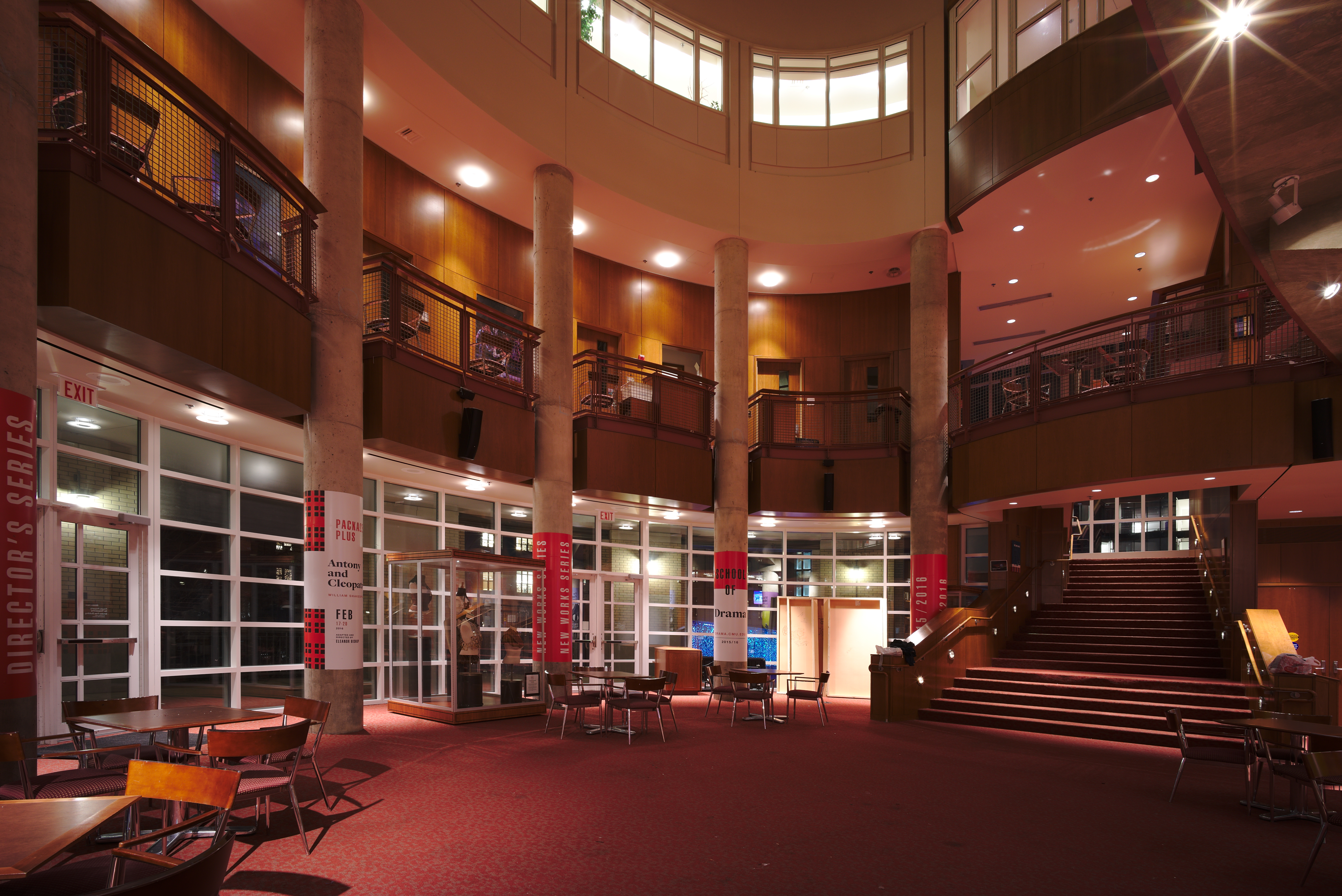
Main atrium of the Purnell Center for the Arts, a building constructed specifically for the School of Drama

In 2017, The Hollywood Reporter's list of best undergraduate drama schools ranked Carnegie Mellon second. In 2014, The Hollywood Reporter ranked the School of Drama number three in the world among drama schools. In 2015, the same publication ranked the MFA program at the School of Drama number five in the world. According to Playbill, the Carnegie Mellon School of Drama ranks fourth in the number of alumni represented in the 2015–2016 Broadway season.

== Facilities ==
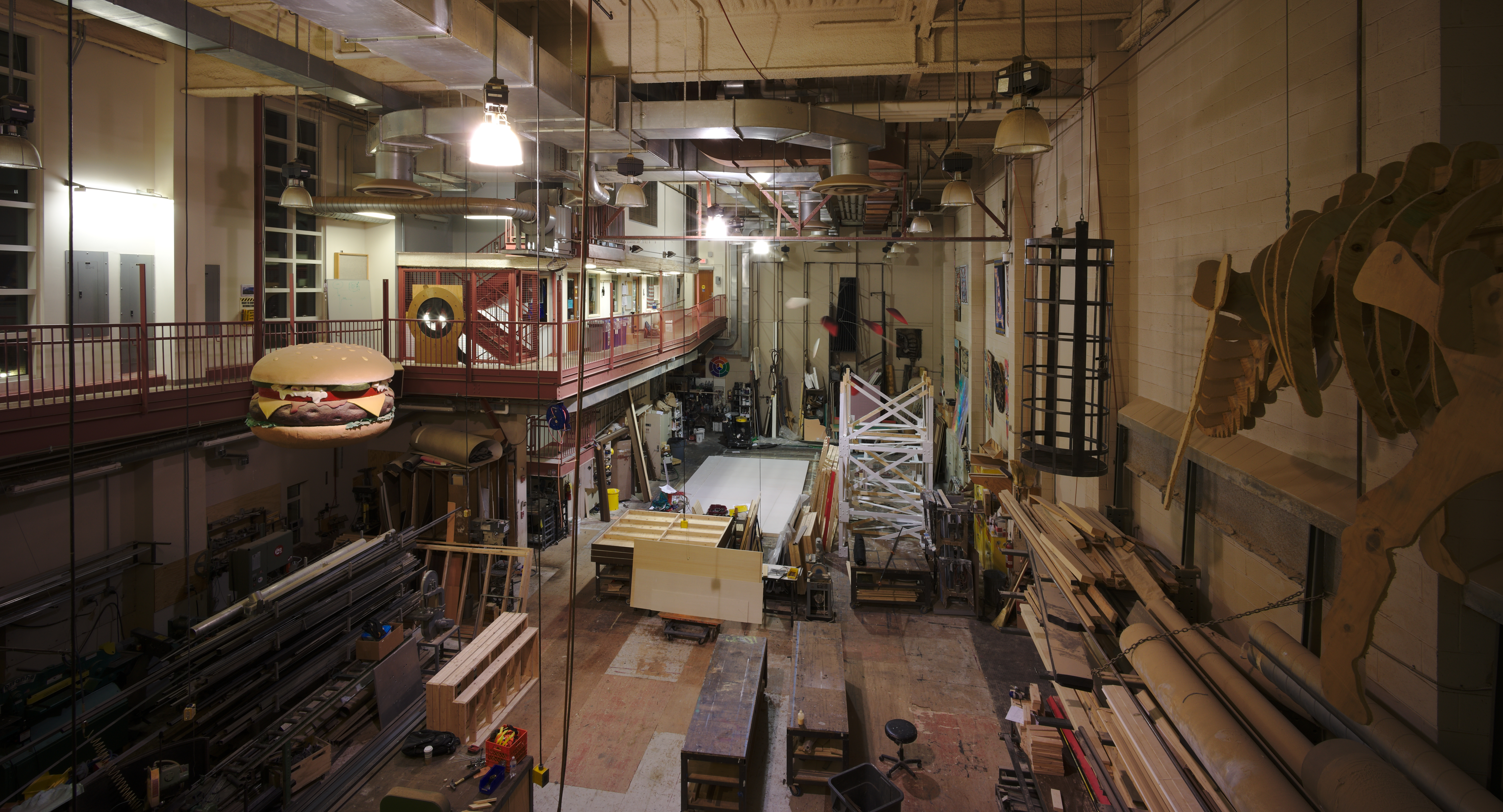
A set construction room in the Purnell Center

Since 2000, the Purnell Center for the Arts, specifically designed for the School of Drama, has been the department's home. The space includes:

- Philip Chosky Theater, a 430-seat proscenium theater
- Helen Wayne Rauh Studio Theater, a 140-seat black box theater
- John Wells Video Studio, a sound stage television studio

As well as two movement/dance studios, three rehearsal studios, four design studios, a lighting lab, a sound lab, a costume shop, a scene shop, and various classrooms.

== Notable alumni ==
- René Auberjonois, actor (Star Trek: Deep Space Nine)
- Habib Azar, director, filmmaker
- Hale Appleman, actor (The Magicians)
- Felecia M. Bell, actress
- Natalie Venetia Belcon, actress
- Tina Benko, actress
- Denée Benton, actress (Natasha, Pierre & The Great Comet of 1812, The Gilded Age)
- Carl Betz, actor (The Donna Reed Show)
- Liza Birkenmeier, playwright (Dr. Ride's American Beach House, Grief Hotel)
- Steven Bochco, Emmy Award-winning writer/producer/director (Hill Street Blues, L.A. Law and NYPD Blue)
- Matthew Bomer, actor (Magic Mike, Chuck, White Collar, Fellow Travelers)
- Abby Brammell, actress
- Will Brill, actor ( Fellow Travelers )
- Anthony Carrigan, actor (Barry)
- Donna Lynne Champlin, actress
- Gaius Charles, actor (Friday Night Lights, Grey's Anatomy)
- Casey Childs, actor, artistic director, Founder of Primary Stages.
- Corey Cott, actor (Newsies, Gigi, Bandstand)
- Casey Cott, actor (Kevin Keller on Riverdale)
- Christina Crawford, author (Mommie Dearest)
- James Cromwell, actor (All In The Family, Babe, The Queen)
- Ted Danson, actor (Cheers, Damages)
- Neal Dodson, film producer (Margin Call, All Is Lost, and A Most Violent Year)
- Dagmara Dominczyk, actress (The Count of Monte Cristo)
- Barbara Feldon, actress
- Katie Finneran, actress (Noises Off, Promises, Promises (musical)) (attended briefly)
- Sutton Foster, actress (Thoroughly Modern Millie, The Drowsy Chaperone, "Anything Goes") (attended briefly)
- Christian Borle, actor (Smash, Spamalot, Legally Blonde, Peter and the Starcatcher)
- Josh Gad, actor (Frozen, The Book of Mormon)
- Renée Elise Goldsberry, Tony Award-winning actress (Hamilton)
- Frank Gorshin, actor/comedian
- Josh Groban, singer (attended briefly)
- Van Hansis, actor (As the World Turns)
- Ian Harding, actor (Pretty Little Liars)
- Joshua Harmon, playwright (Prayer for the French Republic)
- Will Harrison, actor (Daisy Jones & the Six)
- Mariette Hartley, actress
- Ethan Hawke, actor (attended briefly)
- Sian Heder, writer and Academy Award-winning filmmaker (Orange Is The New Black, Tallulah, CODA)
- Megan Hilty, actress/singer (Wicked, 9 to 5)
- Holly Hunter, Academy Award-winning actress
- Erik Jensen, actor/playwright
- Cherry Jones, Tony Award-winning actress
- Rachel Keller, actress on "Fargo" and "Legion" TV series
- Arthur Kennedy, actor
- Dennis Kenney, actor/singer
- Frederick Koehler, actor (Kate & Allie, Oz)
- Jack Klugman, actor
- Andrew Kober, actor
- Eugene Lee, scenic designer (Saturday Night Live)
- Telly Leung, actor (Glee, In Transit, Allegiance)
- Judith Light, actress
- Kara Lindsay, actress (Newsies, Wicked)
- Sara Lindsey, actress
- Michael McMillian, actor (Dorian Blues, True Blood)
- Gabriel Macht, actor
- Joe Manganiello, actor (Magic Mike, True Blood)
- Sonia Manzano, actress (Sesame Street)
- Nancy Marchand, actress (Lou Grant, The Sopranos)
- Rob Marshall, film director, nominated for a 2003 Academy Award for Chicago.
- Rebecca Metz, actor, (Better Things (TV series), Coop and Cami Ask the World, Shameless (U.S. TV series))
- Patina Miller, Tony Award-winning actress (Pippin)
- Katy Mixon, actress (Mike & Molly, American Housewife)
- Ming-Na Wen, actress (The Joy Luck Club, Mulan, ER, Marvel's Agents of S.H.I.E.L.D.)
- Leslie Odom Jr., Tony Award-winning actor (Hamilton)
- Rory O'Malley, Tony Award-nominated actor (The Book of Mormon, Hamilton)
- Cote de Pablo, actress (NCIS)
- Stephanie Palmer, Director of Creative Affairs at MGM, Founder of Good in a Room
- John Pasquin, film director
- Victoria Pedretti, actress (The Haunting of Hill House, You, The Haunting of Bly Manor)
- George Peppard, actor
- David Pevsner, actor
- Billy Porter, actor/singer
- Zachary Quinto, Emmy Award nominated actor (Star Trek, Heroes, 24)
- Darren Ritchie, actor
- George A. Romero, film director
- Ben Levi Ross, actor (Tick Tick Boom)
- Ann Roth, costume designer (The English Patient, The Talented Mr. Ripley)
- Laura San Giacomo, actress
- Pablo Schreiber, Tony Award and Emmy Award nominated actor (Orange is the New Black, American Gods, Thirteen Hours)
- Maïté Schwartz, actor (quarterlife)
- Stephen Schwartz, film and theatre composer
- Leigh Silverman, director
- Emily Skinner, actress/singer
- Josef Sommer, actor
- Aaron Staton, actor (Mad Men)
- Patricia Tallman, actress/stuntwoman (Babylon 5)
- John-Michael Tebelak, playwright and director (Godspell)
- Sada Thompson, actress (Family, The Effect of Gamma Rays on Man-in-the-Moon Marigolds)
- Lola Tung, actress/singer
- Tamara Tunie, actress (Law & Order: Special Victims Unit, As the World Turns)
- Blair Underwood, actor
- Roberta Valderrama, actress (10 Items or Less, ER)
- Paula Wagner, producer (Cruise/Wagner Productions)
- John Wells, executive producer/creator (The West Wing, ER)
- Maura West, actress (As the World Turns)
- Patrick Wilson, actor (Angels in America, Little Children, Watchmen)
- Krista Marie Yu, actress (Dr. Ken, Last Man Standing)
- Kaitlin Hopkins, actress (Beverly Hills, 90210, The Practice, Star Trek: Voyager, Spin City, Diagnosis: Murder)
- Myha'la, actress (Industry (TV series))
- Sarah Pidgeon, actress (Love Story (2026 TV series))

== See also ==
Theatre in Pittsburgh
