= Sheila Vand =

American actress and performance artist

- Born: Los Angeles, California, United States
- Education: UCLA
- Occupations: Actress, performance artist
- Years active: 2007–present

Sheila Vand is an American actress and performance artist. She is known for her role in Ben Affleck's 2012 Oscar-winning film Argo. Vand made her Broadway debut alongside Robin Williams in 2011 in the Pulitzer-nominated Bengal Tiger at the Baghdad Zoo. She has worked with filmmaker Ana Lily Amirpour on several projects, including Pashmaloo which premiered at the Berlinale in 2011 and A Girl Walks Home Alone at Night, which premiered at the 2014 Sundance Film Festival. She also has an ongoing collaboration with 2013 TED speaker Alexa Meade. Their photo series MILK: What Will You Make of Me? is on exhibit at the Gallery for Contemporary Photography Ingo Seufert, Munich, Germany and was also exhibited in the Grand Palais at Art Paris Art Fair. Vand is also the creator of experimental performance piece Sneaky Nietzsche.

== Early life ==
Sheila Vand was born in a suburb of Los Angeles, but grew up in Palo Alto, California. She is a second-generation Iranian-American.

She graduated from the UCLA School of Theater, Film and Television, where she studied acting and directing.

== Career ==
In 2009, Vand originated the role of Hadia in Rajiv Joseph's Bengal Tiger at the Baghdad Zoo, which moved to Broadway in 2011. In 2010, she debuted Sneaky Nietzsche, which she called "a live theatrical music experience for the fictionally-inclined." It was described by the Los Angeles Times as "stepping into a living, changing art piece" and by LA Weekly as an "all-encompassing, sensory overload. In a good way." Vand was commissioned by LACMA in 2011 to remount Sneaky Nietzsche.

Vand played the role of Sahar the Iranian housekeeper in Argo and she also narrates the beginning of the film. Her performance was highlighted in the LA Times' annual piece "Small Roles, Powerful Performances" and she was a recipient of a SAG Outstanding Ensemble Award in 2013.

In 2012, Vand began collaborating with painter/photographer Alexa Meade. Their first joint series MILK: What Will You Make of Me? has been featured in The Huffington Post, Wired, Juxtapoz magazine, and at the 2013 TED Global Conference.

She played the female lead in the 2013 CBS pilot for Beverly Hills Cop, but the show was not picked up to series.

Vand made her Walt Disney Concert Hall debut in 2013, performing with the Los Angeles Philharmonic in the world premiere of Frank Zappa's 200 Motels under the baton of Maestro Esa-Pekka Salonen. She played the role of Lucy opposite Diva Zappa.

Vand plays the title role in A Girl Walks Home Alone at Night, which premiered at the 2014 Sundance Film Festival.

Vand also had a regular role in NBC's short-lived State of Affairs (2014) – cast as Maureen James, she is CIA Secretary of Defense briefer and best friend to the show's lead, Charleston "Charlie" Tucker (Katherine Heigl).

Vand played Fredi Kincaid in the Minority Report (2015) episode "Fredi", who is thought to be a potential murder victim in Dash's vision.

== Filmography ==
=== Film ===
Year	Film	Role	Notes
2008	In the Dark	Nahid	Short film
2009	Peter and the Mischievous Hanky	White Witch	
2010	Bold Native	Sonja	
2010	Passing On	Diana	Short film
2010	Ketab	Saeed's Sister	Short film
2010	Girlfriend	Kenny's Wife	Voice role; uncredited
2011	Pashmaloo	Farah	Short film
2012	This Is Caroline	Deb	Voice role; short film
2012	Argo	Sahar	
2014	A Girl Walks Home Alone at Night	The Girl	
2015	Camino	Marianna	
2016	Whiskey Tango Foxtrot	Shakira El-Khourey	
2016	Holidays	Lily	Segment: "Mother's Day"
2016	Women Who Kill	Simone	
2016	Jimmy Vestvood: Amerikan Hero	Leila	
2017	XX	Carla	Segment: "The Birthday Party"
2017	68 Kill	Monica	
2017	Aardvark	Hannah	
2018	We the Animals	Ma	
2018	Viper Club	Sheila	
2018	Prospect	Inumon	
2019	Triple Frontier	Lauren Yates	
2019	She's Missing	Cherry	
2020	The Wave	Theresa	
2020	The Rental	Mina	
2021	The Fall of the House of Usher	Special appearance	Boston Lyric Opera production
2021	Land of Dreams	Simin	

=== Television ===
Year	Title	Role	Notes
2007	Life	Shahnaz Darvashi	Episode: "A Civil War"
2007–2012	Prom Queen	Courtney	Web series; 27 episodes
2012	NYC 22	Jasmeen	Episode: "Ransom"
2013	Cult	Allegra Constantine	Episodes: "1987", "Flip the Script"
2013	Beverly Hills Cop	Leila	Unsold television pilot
2014	The Red Tent	Meryt	Episode: "Part 2"
2014–2015	State of Affairs	Maureen James	Main role; 13 episodes
2015	BoJack Horseman	Todd's Phone (voice)	Episode: "After the Party"
2015	Minority Report	Fredi Kincaid	Episode: "Fredi"
2017	24: Legacy	Nilaa Mizrani	Main role; 8 episodes
2019	The OA	Yassi	Episode: "SYZYGY"
2019–2022	Undone	Farnaz	Voice
2020–2024	Snowpiercer	Zarah Fahrami	Main role
