= Neal Dodson =

American film producer (born 1978)

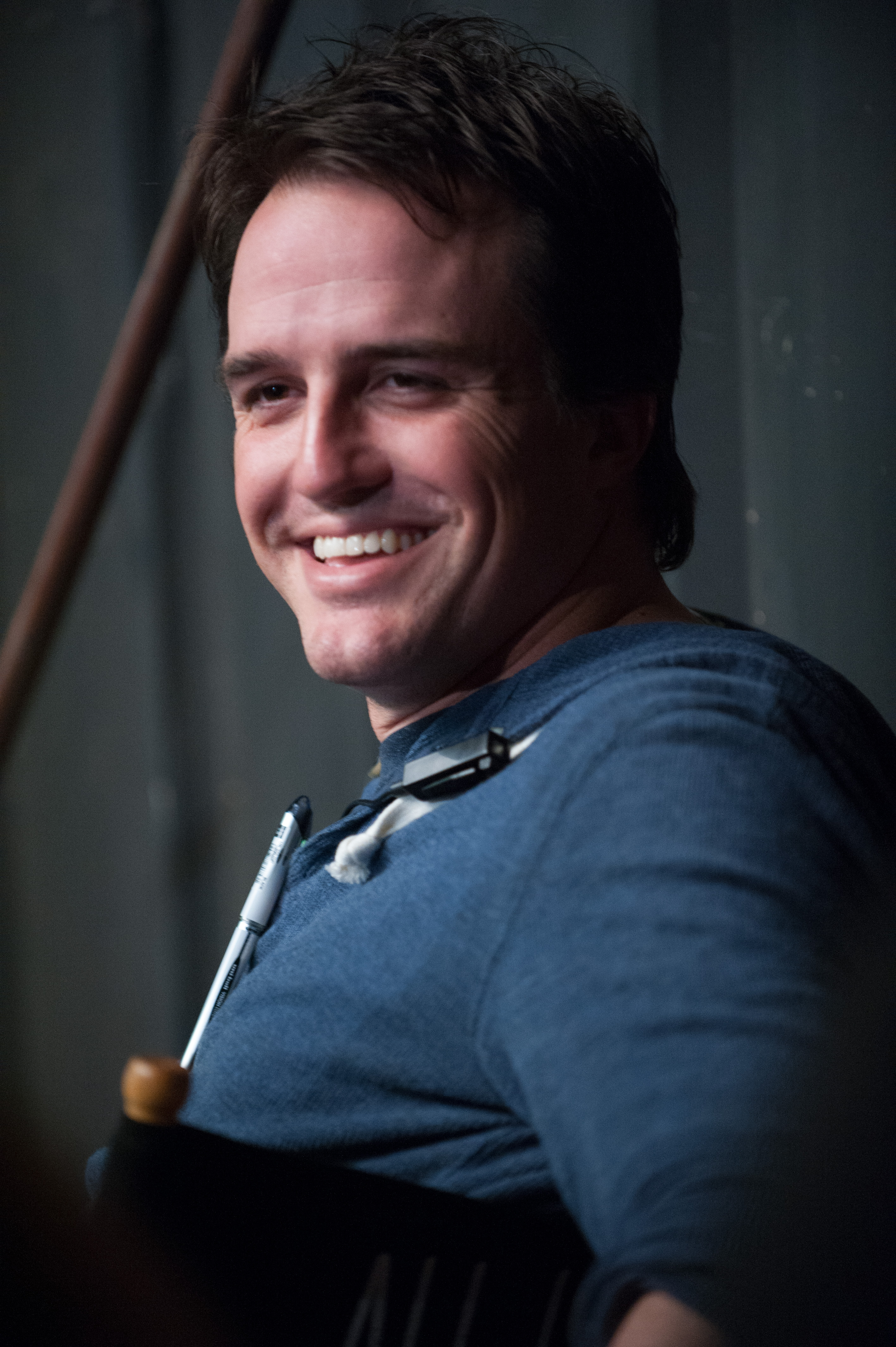
- Dodson in 2017
- Born: May 17, 1978 (age 48); York, Pennsylvania, U.S.
- Education: Carnegie Mellon University (BFA)
- Occupation: Film producer
- Spouse: Ashley Williams (m. 2011)
- Children: 2
- Relatives: Kimberly Williams-Paisley (sister-in-law); Brad Paisley (brother-in-law)

Neal Dodson (born May 17, 1978) is an American film producer. His producer credits include the Academy Award-nominated Margin Call, the Golden Globe Award-winning and Academy Award-nominated All Is Lost starring Robert Redford, the comedy Breakup at a Wedding, the dramas Aardvark and Viper Club, and the film A Most Violent Year starring Oscar Isaac and Jessica Chastain, which won Best Picture from the National Board of Review. Dodson executive produced Another Cinderella Story starring Selena Gomez and Jane Lynch, Banshee Chapter starring Katia Winter, Hollidaysburg starring Rachel Keller, Jonathan starring Ansel Elgort, Love On A Limb starring Ashley Williams and Marilu Henner, Never Here starring Mireille Enos and Sam Shepard, and Periods as well as co-producing Hateship, Loveship starring Kristen Wiig. Dodson also produced and appeared in the Starz documentary filmmaking television series The Chair, which followed two filmmakers making the same film, and was created by producer Chris Moore.

Dodson frequently collaborates with the filmmaker J.C. Chandor through their CounterNarrative Films production company, as well as with actor and producer Zachary Quinto through their Before the Door Pictures production company, founded in 2008 with longtime friends Quinto and Corey Moosa.

== Early life ==
Dodson was born and raised in York, Pennsylvania, where he attended Central York High School. He went to college in Pittsburgh at the Carnegie Mellon School of Drama. After working as an actor in regional theatre and on Broadway in Tom Stoppard's Tony Award-winning production of The Invention of Love, he became a feature film producer.

== Personal life ==
He is married to actress Ashley Williams and they have two sons: Gus and Odie. They split their time between New York and Los Angeles. Dodson is the brother-in-law of country music star Brad Paisley and Ashley's sister, actress Kimberly Williams-Paisley.

== Filmography ==
- Another Cinderella Story (2008)
- Margin Call (2011)
- Breakup at a Wedding (2012)
- All Is Lost (2013)
- The Banshee Chapter (2014)
- A Most Violent Year (2014)
- The Chair (2015) (documentary TV series)
- Hateship, Loveship (2015)
- Aardvark (2017)
- Never Here (2017)
- Jonathan (2018)
- Viper Club (2018)
- Triple Frontier (2019)

== Awards and nominations ==
Year	Association	Category	Work	Result
2012	AACTA International Awards	Best Film – International	Margin Call	Nominated
2012	Independent Spirit Awards	Best First Feature	Margin Call	Won
2014	Satellite Awards	Best Motion Picture	All Is Lost	Nominated
2014	National Board of Review	Best Picture	A Most Violent Year	Won
2014	Independent Spirit Awards	Best Feature	A Most Violent Year	Nominated
