= Before the Door Pictures =

Media production company

Before the Door Pictures is a media production company that was founded in 2008 by three Carnegie Mellon University drama graduates.

== History ==
The company was founded by three Carnegie Mellon University's School of Drama graduates, actor Zachary Quinto, Corey Moosa and Neal Dodson after completing work on J.C. Chandor's All Is Lost, starring Robert Redford and including an appearance at the Cannes Film Festival. Subsequently, they worked on Breakup at a Wedding, The Banshee Chapter, Periods, Never Here, Hollidaysburg, A Most Violent Year, and Aardvark. They also produced and appeared on the Starz filmmaking documentary television series called "The Chair" alongside series creator Chris Moore.

Quinto, Dodson, and Moosa won a 2012 Independent Spirit Award for Best First Feature for producing J. C. Chandor's Margin Call. They also published two graphic novels, including Mr. Murder Is Dead by Victor Quinaz and Lucid by Michael McMillian.

== Filmography ==
- Margin Call (2011)
- Breakup at a Wedding (2013)
- Banshee Chapter (2013)
- All Is Lost (2013)
- A Most Violent Year (2014)
- Periods. (2015)
- The Chair (2015, documentary television series)
- Hollidaysburg (2015)
- Aardvark (2017)
- Never Here (2017)
- Adult Best Friends (2025)

== See also ==
- Lionsgate
