= Periods. =

- Genre: Entertainment
- Created by: Victor Quinaz; Anna Martemucci
- Directed by: Victor Quinaz
- No. of episodes: 15

Production
- Producers: Robinson Films Inc. Nomadic Films; Before the Door Pictures

Periods. is a comedy film series and collective created by Victor Quinaz and Anna Martemucci. Semi-improvised and cinematic in their approach, their anachronistic style has been applied to various epochs (Viking Wives, Pilgrims) and adaptations of literary classics such as East of Eden, Ethan Frome, Little Women, and Bright Lights, Big City.

== Production ==
The series is primarily directed by Victor Quinaz, edited by Charlie Porter and Giovanni P Autran, with cinematography by Giovanni P Autran. Periods is co-produced with Robinson Films, Nomadic Films and Before the Door Pictures.

== Cast ==
The shorts have featured a variety of celebrity cameos including Zachary Quinto (who also is credited as executive producer), Penn Badgley, YouTube star Grace Helbig Pablo Schreiber, and Willie Garson.

The main ensemble consists of Philip Quinaz, Alison Fyhrie, Anna Martemucci, Brian Shoaf, Mary Grill, Giovanni P. Autran, Matt Hobby, Julie Ann Dulude, Damian Lanigan, and Chris Manley.

== Videos ==
Short Film Series
EP#	Title	Date	Cast
1	Pilgrims	Nov 17, 2009	Alison Fyhrie, Philip Quinaz, Anna Martemucci, Giovanni Autran, Victor Quinaz and Yamin Segal
2	Edith Wharton's Ethan Frome	Feb 10, 2010	Philip Quinaz, Alison Fyhrie, Anna Martemucci, Giovanni Autran, Yamin Segal, Lauren Weisstein
3	Forefathers	June 30, 2010	Damian Lanigan, Philip Quinaz, Pablo Schreiber, Brian Shoaf
4	Hags	Oct 24, 2010	Philip Quinaz, Corey Moosa, Alison Fyhrie, Anna Martemucci, Mary Grill
5	Before After	Dec 14, 2010	Zachary Quinto, Philip Quinaz
6	Before After II	Dec 16, 2010	Zachary Quinto, Philip Quinaz, Alison Fyhrie, Brian Shoaf, Anna Martemucci, Lauren Weisstein, Yamin Segal, Wayne McElroy, Pooh Weisstein
7	Nam	Nov 14, 2011	Chris Manley, Anna Martemucci, Mary Grill, Alison Fyhrie, Julie Ann Dulude, Brian Shoad, Giovanni P. Autran, Philip Quinaz, Mikey Palms, Lauren Weisstein, Andy Basore, Niccolo Vitelli, Jake Peron
8	Dec. 26	Dec 19, 2011	Jessica Hong, Anna Martemucci, Philip Quinaz, Evan Leed, Matt Hobby, Alison Fyhrie, Brian Shoaf
9	Viking Wives	March 19, 2012	Alison Fyhrie, Philip Quinaz, Anna Martemucci, Magnus Andersen, Mary Grill, Evan Leed
10	Re: Creation	May 15, 2012	Philip Quinaz, Alison Fyhrie, Chris Manely, Anna Martemucci, Damien Lanigan
11	Fops	July 10, 2012	Matt Hobby, Philip Quinaz, Mary Grill, Brian Shoaf, Willie Garson
12	East of Eden by John Steinbeck	Aug 10, 2012	Penn Badgley, Brian Shoaf, Anna Martemucci, Philip Quinaz, Alison Fyhrie, Charlie Porter, Marc Reina, Dan Levin, Josh Hetzler, Wayne McElroy, Michael Charles Lidondici
13	Lil Women	Feb 25, 2013	Grace Helbig, Mary Grill, Anna Martemucci, Julie Ann Dulude, Evan Leed
14	Big City Bright Lights	June 11, 2013	Philip Quinaz, Anna Martemucci, Michael Lidondici, Brian Shoaf, Andrew Dickerson, Jeff Seal, Alison Fyhrie, Damian Lanigan, Julie Ann Dulude, Chris Manley, Ethan Fixell, Giovanni P Autran
15	Snowden: Day 11	July 5, 2013	Matt Hobby

In addition, the Re: Creation and Lil Women short films both led to spin-off series Talking with God and Lil Women: THe Series produced and published to the Periods. Films YouTube channel.

== Podcast ==
Periods. has only produced and recorded one podcast, "The Podcast of Anne Frank", which was published on December 14, 2012.

== Feature ==
In the summer of 2013, Periods. Films released their first feature film in theaters and digital entitled Breakup At A Wedding produced by Before the Door Pictures and Anonymous Content distributed by Oscilloscope Laboratories.

== Press ==
The series has been featured on several blogs and news outlets such as New York Magazine, Entertainment Weekly, LA Times, and was rated by Time Out NY as the #15 funniest web series. The series has also been honored at the HollyShorts Film Festival as well as featured at the Raindance Film Festival in London and the Berkshire International Film Festival in conjunction with Edith Wharton's estate the Mount.
