= From Beyond (short story) =

1934 short story by H. P. Lovecraft

- Short story by H. P. Lovecraft
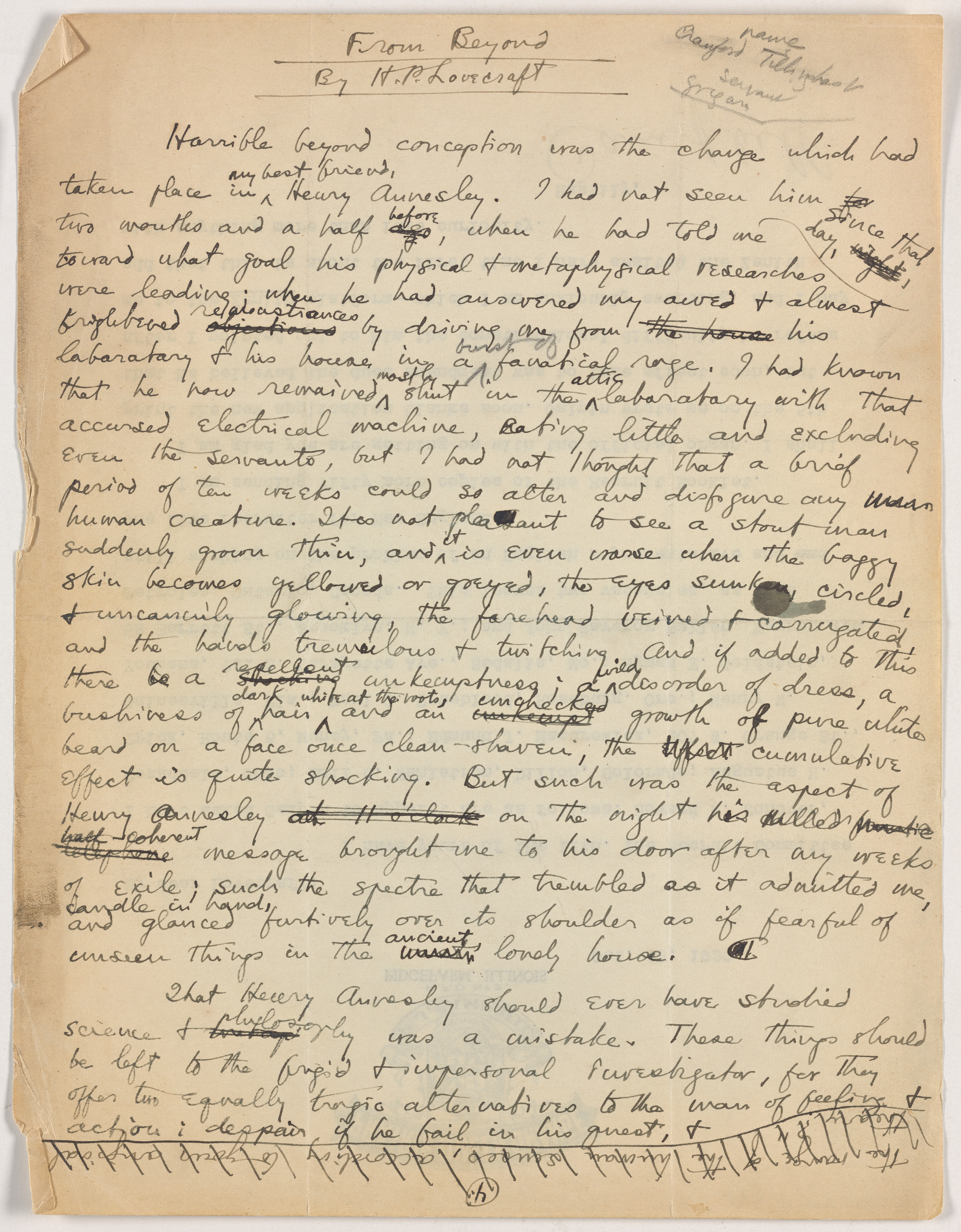
- First page of the manuscript From Beyond.

Text available at Wikisource
- Country: United States
- Language: English
- Genre: Horror

Publication
- Published in: The Fantasy Fan
- Publication date: 1934

"From Beyond" is a horror genre short story by American writer H. P. Lovecraft. It was written in 1920 and was first published in The Fantasy Fan in June 1934 (Vol. 1, No. 10).

== Plot ==
The story is told from the first-person perspective of an unnamed narrator, detailing his experiences with a scientist named Crawford Tillinghast. Tillinghast creates an electronic device that emits a resonance wave, which stimulates an affected person's pineal gland, thereby allowing them to perceive planes of existence outside the scope of accepted reality.

Sharing the experience with Tillinghast, the narrator becomes aware of a translucent, interdimensional environment that overlaps our recognized reality. From this perspective, he witnesses hordes of strange and horrific creatures that defy description. Tillinghast reveals that he has used his machine to transport his house servants into the overlapping plane of reality. He also reveals that the effect works both ways, and allows the inter-dimensional creature denizens of the alternate dimension to perceive humans. Tillinghast's servants were attacked and killed by one such inter-dimensional entity, and Tillinghast informs the narrator that it is right behind him. Terrified beyond measure, the narrator pulls out his gun and shoots it at the machine, destroying it. Tillinghast dies immediately afterward from apoplexy. The police investigate the scene, and it is placed on record that Tillinghast murdered the servants despite their remains never being found.

== Characters ==
The best friend of the story's narrator, Tillinghast, is a researcher of the "physical and metaphysical". Characterized as a man of "feeling and action", the narrator describes his physical transformation after he succeeds in his experiments: "It is not pleasant to see a stout man suddenly grown thin, and it is even worse when the baggy skin becomes yellowed or grayed, the eyes sunken, circled, and uncannily glowing, the forehead veined and corrugated, and the hands tremulous and twitching."

In the first draft of the story, Lovecraft called the character Henry Annesley; he replaced that name with one composed of two old Providence surnames. In The Case of Charles Dexter Ward, Lovecraft mentions "the seasoned salts who manned … the great brigs of the Browns, Crawfords, and Tillinghasts"; James Tillinghast and Eliza Tillinghast are minor characters in that story.

== Connections ==
S. T. Joshi points out that the story's theme of "a reality beyond that revealed to us by the senses, or that which we experience in everyday life", is continued in later Lovecraft tales, such as "The Shunned House" (1924), "The Colour Out of Space" (1927), "The Dreams in the Witch House" and others. For example, in "The Shunned House", the narrator says that "scientific study and reflection had taught us that the known universe of three dimensions embraces the merest fraction of the whole cosmos of substance and energy."

== Reception ==
The book Science-Fiction: The Early Years describes the concepts of "From Beyond" as "very interesting, despite stiff, immature writing". S. T. Joshi judges it "unlikely that 'From Beyond' … will ever be regarded as one of Lovecraft's better tales", due to "its slipshod style, melodramatic excess and general triteness of plot". Joshi also considers Crawford Tillinghast's references to the pineal gland to be a joke at the expense of René Descartes, who proposed that this gland was the point of mediation between the material body and the immaterial soul.

== Adaptations ==
- From Beyond was adapted into a 1986 film of the same title by horror director Stuart Gordon. In the film, Dr. Crawford Tillinghast (played by Jeffrey Combs) has a different role, as the cautious assistant of the crazed, obsessive Dr. Edward Pretorius.
- The short story was also the inspiration for the 2013 horror film Banshee Chapter, which loosely adapts it and the 1986 Gordon film.
- The story, along with "Herbert West, Reanimator", was adapted into the 2022 web series The Resonator for Full Moon Features.

== Influence ==
- The 1998 science-fiction video game Half-Life depicts an event known as a "resonance cascade" that occurs during an experiment with alien geologic material gone wrong. As the cascade takes place, alien creatures from other dimensions appear and disappear randomly in our world.
- American stoner doom metal band and Lovecraft devotees Sleep included a song of the same title on their 1992 album Sleep's Holy Mountain.
- Charles Stross's novel The Jennifer Morgue features an electronic device known as a "Tillinghast resonator", which allows the user to see otherwise invisible entities.
- American death metal band Massacre released a largely Lovecraft-themed album of the same title in 1991.
- The video game Psi-Ops: The Mindgate Conspiracy features "Aura Beasts" that are seen using one of the psychic powers the protagonist develops called "Aura View". This ability parallels the effects Crawford Tillinghast's device has on the characters in "From Beyond", who perceive creatures from another dimension as a result of using the device.
- In the Stargate SG-1 episode "Sight Unseen", an alien device is accidentally activated that allows members of SG-1 to see, but not interact with, strange insectoid creatures who inhabit a dimension parallel to our own. Though originally confined to the Cheyenne Mountain Complex, the phenomenon of this "second sight" is also spread by touch. It quickly spreads to nearby populations, mostly by way of a "sight-infected" conspiracy theorist who stumbles upon a real government conspiracy concerning aliens and the SG-1. Parts of Colorado and Wyoming are "quarantined" until the process can be reversed. Hallucinogenic chemicals are used for a cover-up story.
- Death metal band Ripping Corpse's song "Beyond Humanity" is directly inspired by the Lovecraft story and the Gordon film.
- Dark ambient and Halloween-themed duo Nox Arcana based their 2009 album Blackthorn Asylum on this story, with some twists of their own.
- Heavy metal band Manilla Road adapted the story to a song of the same title featured in their 1990 album The Courts of Chaos.
- The 2013 movie Banshee Chapter features a similar plot involving the drug dimethyltryptamine instead of Ultraviolet. At one point Lovecraft's short story is explicitly mentioned.
- The Star Trek: The Next Generation episode "Phantasms" features inter-phasic parasites, undetectable under normal conditions, that feed off of cellular matter, and are perceived by Data as surrealistic objects during his dream program. Individuals experiencing elements of the world beyond our own through dreams and visions is a common theme in Lovecraftian literature.
- The ninth issue of Alan Moore's comic Providence draws heavily from "From Beyond".
- A similar concept is used in the 2015 video game Bloodborne where by gathering a collectible called “insight” different creatures start to become visible in the player's world with the more insight they gather, and disappear again when they no longer have enough insight.
- The video game Lust from Beyond (2021) deals with similar themes and was inspired by Lovecraft's works.
- Celia S. Friedman's short story "The Dreaming Kind" is about two genetically modified cats who can see the inhabitants of what they call "the dreaming" which are described as existing and appearing similarly to the creatures in From Beyond. They live near an experimental facility with a central machine exhibiting similar results to Tillingham's.
