= Viper Club =

- Directed by: Maryam Keshavarz
- Written by: Maryam Keshavarz; Jonathan Mastro
- Produced by: Anna Gerb; Neal Dodson; J. C. Chandor
- Starring: Susan Sarandon; Matt Bomer; Lola Kirke; Julian Morris; Sheila Vand; Adepero Oduye; Edie Falco
- Cinematography: Drew Daniels
- Edited by: Andrea Chignoli
- Music by: Gingger Shankar
- Production companies: CounterNarrative; MaraKesh Films
- Distributed by: YouTube Premium; Roadside Attractions
- Release dates: September 10, 2018 (TIFF); October 26, 2018 (United States)
- Running time: 109 minutes
- Country: United States
- Language: English

Viper Club is a 2018 American drama film directed by Maryam Keshavarz and starring Susan Sarandon. The film was produced by YouTube Premium in association with CounterNarrative and MaraKesh Films and held its world premiere at the Toronto International Film Festival on September 10, 2018. The film was released theatrically in the United States on October 26, 2018.

== Premise ==
Viper Club follows "a veteran emergency room nurse secretly struggling to free her grown son, a journalist, from capture by a terrorist group. After running into roadblocks with government agencies, she discovers a clandestine community of journalists and advocates who might be able to help her."

== Cast ==
- Susan Sarandon as Helen
- Matt Bomer as Sam
- Lola Kirke as Amy
- Julian Morris as Andy
- Sheila Vand as Sheila
- Adepero Oduye as Keisha
- Edie Falco as Charlotte
- Paul Eenhoorn as Jim

== Production ==
On March 21, 2018, it was announced that YouTube Red had just finished production on a film, then-titled Vulture Club, directed by Maryam Keshavarz. The film was written by Keshavarz alongside Jonathan Mastro and executive produced by Anna Gerb, Neal Dodson, and J. C. Chandor. Cast members were set to include Susan Sarandon, Edie Falco, Matt Bomer, Julian Morris, Lola Kirke, and Sheila Vand.

== Release ==
The film was distributed by Roadside Attractions and released on October 26, 2018. Following its theatrical run, the film was made available for streaming on YouTube Premium.

On September 10, 2018, the film held its world premiere at the Toronto International Film Festival as a featured selection in the "Special Presentations" series of films. That same day, the official trailer for the film was released.

=== Controversy ===
After attending the premiere of the film in Toronto, Diane Foley, the mother of slain journalist James Foley, expressed criticism of the film. Although the production team contacted and spoke to Foley and the parents of other kidnapped journalists during the production process, she felt the plot of the film was inappropriate and misleading from what she said were events from her and her late son's lives. Although the screenplay was researched and written before production commenced, Foley had publicly shared details about the process of locating and negotiating for the release of her son. Foley thinks that although director Maryam Keshavarz claims to have made a fictional work, she used and unfairly manipulated details of her personal life to produce a dramatic story.

== Reception ==
The film was met with a mixed to negative response from critics upon its premiere. On the review aggregation website Rotten Tomatoes, the film holds a 38% approval rating with an average rating of 5.1/10 based on 34 reviews. The website's critical consensus reads, "Viper Club benefits from Susan Sarandon's committed lead performance, but a treacly script robs this geopolitical drama of any bite." Metacritic, which uses a weighted average, assigned the series a score of 57 out of 100 based on 13 critics, indicating "mixed or average reviews".
