= Aardvark (2017 film) =

2017 film by Brian Shoaf

- Film poster
- Directed by: Brian Shoaf
- Written by: Brian Shoaf
- Produced by: Neal Dodson; Susan Leber; Zachary Quinto
- Starring: Zachary Quinto; Jenny Slate; Sheila Vand; Jon Hamm
- Cinematography: Eric Lin
- Production companies: Before The Door Pictures; Great Point Media; Suzie Q Productions
- Distributed by: Great Point Media
- Release dates: April 21, 2017 (Tribeca); April 13, 2018 (United States)
- Running time: 89 minutes
- Country: United States
- Language: English

Aardvark is a 2017 American drama film directed and written by Brian Shoaf. The film stars Zachary Quinto, Jenny Slate, Sheila Vand, and Jon Hamm. Principal photography began on November 30, 2015 in New York City. It premiered at the 2017 Tribeca Film Festival. It was released on April 13, 2018. Emily Milburton is a therapist who is struggling with personal problems. Things change when she meets her new patient, Josh Norman, who is mentally ill. Josh starts to develop feelings for Emily but things get interesting when Emily falls for Josh's brother, Craig.

== Cast ==
- Zachary Quinto as Josh Norman, Craig’s brother
- Jenny Slate as Emily Milburton
- Jon Hamm as Craig Norman, Josh's brother
- Sheila Vand as Hannah
- Tonya Pinkins as Abigail
- Marin Ireland as Jenny
- Peter Grosz as Anthony
- Dale Soules as Lucille

== Production ==
On October 23, 2015, it was announced that Brian Shoaf would direct a drama film Aardvark based on his own script, while Zachary Quinto would produce the film along with Susan Leber and Neal Dodson. Great Point Media would be financing the film.

Principal photography on the film began on November 30, 2015 in New York City.

== Reception ==
On review aggregator website Rotten Tomatoes, the film holds an approval rating of 12% based on 25 reviews, and an average rating of 3.8/10. On Metacritic, the film has a weighted average score of 39 out of 100, based on 12 critics, indicating "generally unfavorable" reviews.
