= Phantasms (Star Trek: The Next Generation) =

- Star Trek: The Next Generation episode
- Episode no.: Season 7 Episode 6
- Directed by: Patrick Stewart
- Written by: Brannon Braga
- Production code: 258
- Original air date: October 25, 1993

Guest appearances
- Gina Ravera - Tyler; Bernard Kates - Sigmund Freud; Clyde Kusatsu - Adm. Nakamura; David Crowley - Workman

Episode chronology
← Previous "Gambit, Part II"	Next → "Dark Page"
- Star Trek: The Next Generation season 7

"Phantasms" is the 158th episode of the American science fiction television series Star Trek: The Next Generation, the sixth episode of the seventh season.

Set in the 24th century, the series follows the adventures of the Starfleet crew of the Federation starship Enterprise-D. In this episode, as the Enterprise sits adrift in space from unknown warp engine problems, Data's dream program leads to apparently aberrant behavior.

This episode was broadcast on October 25, 1993, and was directed by Patrick Stewart, who also plays Captain Picard on the show.

== Plot ==
Data experiences a strange dream that begins with him walking a corridor within the Enterprise, then hearing a rotary dial phone sound, and sees three workmen that he says are "dismantling a warp plasma conduit". When he tries to speak to them, he can only emit a high-pitched noise. The workmen turn and rip off Data's appendages, finally tearing off his head, before Data "wakes" from the dream. Though Data is worried about the odd nature of dreams Counselor Troi suggests he continue, as dreaming can be therapeutic.

Captain Picard is invited to a formal admirals' dinner, an event that he has been trying to avoid for several years as it would be rather boring. Unable to provide excuses, he orders the Enterprise towards Starbase 219 where the banquet is to be held, but they find the new warp drive will not engage. Data and Chief Engineer La Forge attempt to diagnose the problem, but after they double-check the new configuration, the engines still refuse to engage.

Later, Data finds himself in another dream, now set in Ten-Forward. In addition to the workmen, other members of the crew are present, in particular Troi as part of a large cellular peptide cake with mint frosting according to Lieutenant Worf. The workmen prompt Data to cut into the shoulder of the cake while Troi tries to convince Data to stop. Suddenly Data "wakes", finding other crew members looking for him, as he has been late for his shift. Data has never experienced this before, and tries to understand the meaning of his dreams with a holodeck-simulated Sigmund Freud. Later, while still working with La Forge to repair the engines, he begins to see imagery from his dreams while awake, including seeing crewmen with "small mouths" on their bodies, and an engineering tool appearing briefly as the cake knife. Later in a turbolift, Data stabs Troi in the shoulder, claiming to have seen one of those mouths there. He willingly puts himself under guard in his quarters, fearing what harm he might do to others, and places his pet cat Spot in the care of a reluctant (and seemingly allergic) Worf.

Dr. Crusher takes care of Troi's wound but finds the spot still discolored after her treatment. Investigating further, she discovers the presence of interphasic creatures that are feeding on the Enterprise crew, which can only be seen under interphasic radiation. The crew realizes the creatures are where Data has been seeing the small mouths, and believes Data may know how to deal with the creatures through the dreams he has been experiencing. They hook up Data to the holodeck and watch as Data's dreams play out, helping Data to understand them. Data realizes that his mind has been telling him that he can adjust his circuitry to an interphasic pulse that will kill the creatures. La Forge speculates that the ship's new warp drive may have been infested with the creatures, and Data's pulse successfully eradicates them and allows the ship to enter warp. However, the repairs take so long that Picard is able to avoid the Admirals' dinner yet again.

Troi later visits Data, who has since apologized for his attack. She shows no resentment, but jokingly remarks "Turnabout is fair play": she has made a cake shaped like Data for them to share.

== Reception ==
In 2013, The A.V. Club listed "Phantasms" as one of the "21 TV episodes that do dream sequences right". Tor.com noted the quote of Sigmund Freud, but was overall not very impressed with the episode.

In 2016, The Hollywood Reporter rated "Phantasms" the 83rd best episode of all Star Trek episodes. They thought the episode gave viewers one of the most iconic and schlocky scenes in Star Trek history.

In 2017, Popular Mechanics said that "Phantasms" was one of the top ten most fun episodes of Star Trek: The Next Generation, noting that it had bizarre and/or scary scenes based on Data's dreams. In 2018, TheGamer ranked this one of the top 25 creepiest episodes of all Star Trek series.

In 2019, Screen Rant ranked "Phantasms" the fourth funniest episode of Star Trek: The Next Generation.

In 2020, GameSpot noted this episode as one of the most bizarre moments of series, when the bridge crew chows down on a cake version of Troi.

In 2020, Looper listed this as one of the best episodes for Data, calling it one of his "weirdest funniest" episodes, and noting a link to the noted science fiction novel Do Androids Dream of Electric Sheep?.

In 2020, Den of Geek ranked this episode the 16th scariest episode of all Star Trek series.

== Releases ==
"Phantasms" and "Gambit, Part II" were released together on one double-side LaserDisc in the USA on February 2, 1999.

"Phantasms" and "Gambit, Part 2" were released on VHS paired with on one cassette tape (Catalog number VHR 2858).

"Phantasms" was released as part of TNG Season 7 collections on DVD and Blu-Ray formats. Season 7 of TNG, which contains this episode was released on Blu-ray disc in January 2015.

== See also ==
- From Beyond (short story)
