= The Resonator =

- Genre: Horror
- Based on: the work of by H.P. Lovecraft
- Directed by: William Butler
- Starring: Dane Oliver; Josh Cole; Michael Paré; Amanda Jones; Christina Hélène Braa; Jeffrey Byron
- Country of origin: United States
- Original language: English
- No. of episodes: 6

Production
- Production company: Full Moon Features

Original release
- Release: 2021 – 2022

The Resonator, also known by the title of its first arc, The Resonator: Miskatonic U as well as Miskatonic U, is an American web series written and directed by William Butler and loosely based upon the works of H. P. Lovecraft. The series is also based on the Lovecraft adaptations by director Stuart Gordon. Initially released as a series of web-released episodes beginning in 2021, the six-episode series was collected into a single movie and released by Full Moon Entertainment in 2022.

== Synopsis ==
=== Premise ===
Told in three arcs, the series is loosely based upon the works of H. P. Lovecraft, primarily "From Beyond" and "Herbert West–Reanimator". Set at the fictional college of Miskatonic University, the series follows students Crawford Tillinghast and Herbert West as they engage in their own respective experiments. As the series progresses the two men become entangled in not only issues arising from their work but also interference from the sinister Professor Wallace.

=== Summary ===
Crawford Tillinghast is a student at Miskatonic University who believes in alternate universes and dimensions. Using his dead father's notes as a guide, he manages to successfully create a resonator capable of opening portals to other dimensions but kills his assistant Brian in the process. Crawford resumes his experiments with the help of his friends and girlfriend Mara, all of whom are quickly enamored by the machine's ability to give them pleasure. This quickly turns to horror as the group are attacked by entities that use the resonator to cross over. Before Crawford can dismantle the machine he is blackmailed into continuing the experiments by Professor Wallace, who confesses to murdering Crawford's father to gain control of the resonator in the past. He then uses the resonator to give himself godlike powers, only for Crawford, his friends, and the spirit of his father to stop Wallace. The machine implodes, causing Crawford to travel to a new reality where he has yet to conduct his experiments.

Crawford soon discovers that he is still in danger, as he is haunted by nightmares of the entities and visions of his father. His father warns him that the machine has attracted the attention of Kathogra, a descendant of Cthulu who wishes to destroy the earth. She has been tormenting Crawford's friends, resulting in the suicide of one (Brandon), and the psychic torment of another (Carrie). Crawford is once again blackmailed into resuming his experiments, this time by Brandon's mother Julia, who intends to use it to restore Brandon to life. Crawford invites this reality's Wallace to participate, telling him and Julia that he can open two portals that will satisfy the both of them. He tells them that the machine is not ready yet, which frustrates Julia, who remains behind to secretly fix the machine. She is successful, but is then murdered by Dakota, a Miskatonic University student and follower of Kathogra who intends to use the resonator to bring the entity over fully.

Meanwhile, fellow student Herbert West has begun experimenting with a serum with the goal of restoring life, using the basement of his current lodgings as a laboratory. This intrigues his roommate Atlas, who eagerly joins in on the experiments. This eagerness turns to horror when Atlas sees a cadaver return as a violent reanimate, which he tries to shoot. The shot goes wild and instead hits his girlfriend Kelly, who came to see what they were doing. Atlas calls in Mara to stabilize Kelly so she can travel to the hospital. West finds himself impressed by Mara's intelligence and resourcefulness, as she takes the discovery of the reanimate in stride and suggests several improvements to the serum and reanimation process. Mara also recommends moving the experiments to the building housing the resonator, unaware that Crawford is still working on the machine. Assuming Kelly is stable, Mara and West leave to obtain cadavers and prep the building. While they are gone Kelly dies and Atlas uses a failed version of the serum to revive her. She returns as an intelligent but violent reanimate that he brings to Mara and West.

Crawford and Wallace arrive at the resonator to discover it running. They manage to stabilize it and open a portal, after which Crawford shoots Wallace dead out of revenge. This, along with the impact of the resonator on Mara and West, cause the two and Atlas to investigate. Kelly uses this as an opportunity to free herself and reanimate the cadavers. Kathogra begins to cross over, much to Dakota's joy. Before she can fully cross over she is torn to pieces by the reanimates. Dakota is decapitated by Carrie and Atlas is killed by Kelly. The resonator then implodes. The series ends with a voiceover from West. He admits that dismissing spirituality was an oversight, but also emphasizes the value of repeated experiments and research. West is then shown continuing his experiments with a new version of his serum, which is now glowing and green in color.

== Cast ==
- Dane Oliver as Crawford Tillinghast
- Josh Cole as Herbert West
- Michael Paré as Professor Wallace
- Christina Hélène Braa as Mara Esteban
- Kate Hodge as Julia
- Jeffrey Byron as Phillip Tillinghast
- Hannah Hueston as Kathogra
- Victoria Richards as Kelly Lawrence
- Nate Blair as Brandon
- Amanda Jones as Carrie Coleman
- Michael Alan Herman as Hunter
- Chase Howard as Atlas Hayes

== Production ==
Plans to create the series were announced in November 2020. Production on the first entry, The Resonator: Miskatonic U, began in December of the same year in Los Angeles, California and filming took place during January 2021. The resulting series was to be based on both the works H. P. Lovecraft as well as the Stuart Gordon films From Beyond and Re-Animator. Actors Michael Pare and Amanda Wyss were brought on to star in The Resonator, which was written and directed by William Butler. Pare would go on to appear in the next two parts of the series, Beyond the Resonator and Curse of the Re-Animator; Butler would also return to write and direct.

Filming for the second part, Beyond the Resonator, took place during December 2021 and Josh Cole was confirmed as portraying Herbert West. A trailer was released the following year.

== Media and release ==
=== Episodes ===
The Resonator was released in three arcs, each of which was made up of two episodes for a combined total of six episodes. The first arc, The Resonator: Miskatonic U, was released starting in 2021. The final arc, Curse of the Re-Animator, was released the following year.

No.	Title	Original release date
1	"The Resonator: Miskatonic U"	February 26, 2021
2	"The Resonator: Destination Beyond"	February 26, 2021
3	"The Resonator: The Rise of Katthogra"	February 11, 2022
4	"The Resonator: Herbert West returns"	February 11, 2022
5	"The Resonator: Curse of the Re-Animator"	March 26, 2023
6	"The Resonator: Edge of the Apocalypse"	March 26, 2023

=== Film ===
In 2022, after the release of the final portion of the web series, Curse of the Re-Animator, Full Moon Features edited the collected episodes into a single film approximately three hours long.

== Reception ==
Critical reception for the first arc were mixed. Many reviews compared it to the films of Stuart Gordon and DVD Talk wrote that Resonator was "decent if you take it for what it is, like a fan film based on a bigger franchise." Film Threat felt that the characters of Crawford Tillinghast and Professor Wallace could have used more development while also stating that the overall cast "is good, the effects are great, the music is terrific, and the whole affair is quite creepy."
