= Jenny Gabrielle =

American actress

Jenny Gabrielle is an American actress. She appeared in more than forty films since 2001.

== Selected filmography ==
Film
Year	Title	Role	Notes
2001	Festival in Cannes	Blue	
2007	Intervention	Olivia	
2010	The Dry Land	Tina	
2013	Banshee Chapter	Callie	
2013	Force of Execution	Karen	
2015	Maze Runner: The Scorch Trials	Ponytail	
2019	The Kid	Mirabel	

TV
Year	Title	Role	Notes
2008	In Plain Sight	Rachel Miller	
2012	Seal Team Six: The Raid on Osama Bin Laden	Tricia	
2017	A Mother's Crime	Danielle	
