= Banshee Chapter =

- Theatrical release poster
- Directed by: Blair Erickson
- Screenplay by: Blair Erickson
- Story by: Daniel J. Healy
- Based on: "From Beyond" by H. P. Lovecraft
- Produced by: Zachary Quinto
- Starring: Ted Levine; Katia Winter; Michael McMillian
- Cinematography: Jeremy Obertone
- Edited by: Jacques Gravett
- Music by: Andreas Weidinger
- Production companies: Sunchaser Entertainment; Before the Door Pictures; Favorit Film
- Distributed by: XLrator Media
- Release dates: August 22, 2013 (Fantasy Filmfest); December 12, 2013 (United States)
- Running time: 87 minutes
- Country: United States
- Language: English

Banshee Chapter (sometimes referred to as The Banshee Chapter) is a 2013 American science fiction horror film and the directorial debut of Blair Erickson. The film had its first screening at the Fantasy Filmfest on August 22, 2013, and released on video on demand on December 12 of the same year. Banshee Chapter stars Katia Winter as a journalist who is trying to discover what happened to a missing friend. The film is loosely based on the H. P. Lovecraft short story "From Beyond".

== Plot ==
Documenting his investigation of the government Project MKUltra, James Hirsch takes dimethyltryptamine-19 (DMT-19), a drug used in the experiments, while filmed by a friend. Bizarre music and voices are broadcast from a nearby radio. A shadowy figure comes and leaves James with all-black eyes and a disfigured face.

Anne, a reporter who attended college with James, is concerned about his disappearance. James's friend also mysteriously disappeared a few days after the police questioned him. Anne investigates James's house and discovers a betamax cassette containing footage of the MKUltra experiments as well as a book of notes about the project. She consults a local expert, who tells her the bizarre radio broadcast is a phantom radio station that can only be picked up in the desert at night. Anne drives out into the desert after dark to pick up the broadcast, but flees when a monstrous form appears from the darkness.

A clue in James's notes leads Anne to counter-culture writer Thomas Blackburn, infamous for his drug use and unpredictable behavior. After being rebuffed over the phone (over her mentioning Project MKUltra), Anne travels to Blackburn's home and lies to gain his confidence. Blackburn sees through her ruse and tricks her into taking DMT-19. Anne is angry about the deception, and Blackburn's friend Callie begins exhibiting the same behaviors and disfigurement as James. Investigating the bizarre music played by the phantom station, Anne is attacked by a strange entity. Anne and Blackburn awaken to find Callie missing.

They head to Callie's house, where Anne is nearly captured by Callie, now under the entity's control. They realize that DMT-19 works as a "radio antenna" that causes the consumers to tune into otherworldly entities' signals and get their bodies taken over. The government received instructions to make DMT-19 from the otherworldly entities and made the drug, unaware of the full consequences. In addition to the base chemical compound, scientists were adding harvested material from the pineal gland of a female corpse, dubbed the "Primary Source", who returned to life during an experiment and attacked a doctor.

Blackburn reveals that he lied about giving her DMT-19. Realizing the entity will pursue her regardless, Anne resolves to end the broadcast. Realizing the signal likely comes from an MKUltra laboratory, the two travel into the desert and discover the laboratory in an abandoned fallout shelter. Inside, they discover a room full of radio equipment and a large tank containing a pale figure with black eyes (implied to be the "Primary Source"). The radio equipment comes to life and broadcasts the numbers station.

As Anne is chased by a grotesque figure, Blackburn begins to bleed from the eyes and convulse. To avoid being taken over, he shoots himself in the head. In a frenzy, Anne pours the gasoline into the tank and set it on fire. The resulting explosion knocks her unconscious. When she comes to, she finds the clothing James wore before his disappearance lying in the hallway, implying that the creature chasing her was "wearing" James.

Anne is taken into police custody and visited by a co-worker. She and Anne discuss the tape that Anne discovered. Eventually Anne realizes that DMT-19's effects can be passed along by human touch, which explains why she sees the creatures without having taken it. To her horror Anne discovers the entities have taken over her coworker (whose hand she had held earlier). Recovered footage on the tape reveals another Project MKUltra test subject: a college-aged Blackburn.

== Cast ==
- Ted Levine as Thomas Blackburn
- Katia Winter as Anne Roland
- Michael McMillian as James Hirsch
- Monique Candelaria as Patient 14
- Chad Brummett as Dr. Kessle
- Jenny Gabrielle as Callie
- J.D. Garfield as Elderly Doctor
- Alex Gianopoulos as Renny Seegan
- David Midthunder as Raoul
- Vivian Nesbitt as Olivia Kmiec
- Ben Samuels as Science Editor
- Cyd Schulte as Laura Henrik
- William Sterchi as Henry Cale

== Production ==
While creating Banshee Chapter, writer/director Blair Erickson was inspired by H. P. Lovecraft's short story "From Beyond", as well as the history of hallucinogenic drug experiments performed by the United States Government. Ted Levine was one of the first people cast for the movie, but casting the lead of Anne was more difficult and Erickson said he auditioned "several hundred" women before deciding on Katia Winter. Erickson also experienced difficulty with the film's limited budget and filming timeline, as they only had 28 days to film Banshee Chapter. As a result, some characters were eliminated from the beginning of the script in order to fit the limited shooting schedule.

== Reception ==
Critical reception for Banshee Chapter was mostly positive and the film holds a rating of 77% on Rotten Tomatoes based upon 22 reviews. However, the it only rated 5.4 stars out of 10 on IMDb upon 11,000 reviews. Common praise for the film centered around Winter and Levine's performances, with both Screen Daily and Fearnet marking the performances as a highlight.
