= Breakup at a Wedding =

- Directed by: Victor Quinaz
- Written by: Anna Martemucci; Victor Quinaz; Philip Quinaz
- Produced by: Anna Martemucci; Victor Quinaz; Zachary Quinto; Neal Dodson; Corey Moosa; Sean Akers; Steve Golin; Richard Brown
- Starring: Alison Fyhrie; Philip Quinaz; Victor Quinaz; Mary Grill; Chris Manley; Damian Lanigan; Anna Martemucci; Brian Shoaf; Caitlin Fitzgerald; Hugh Scully
- Cinematography: Giovanni P. Autran
- Edited by: Charlie Porter; Evan Leed; Giovanni P. Autran
- Production companies: Before the Door Pictures; Anonymous Content
- Distributed by: Oscilloscope Laboratories
- Release date: June 18, 2013
- Running time: 85 minutes
- Country: United States

Breakup at a Wedding is the first film from comedy collective PERIODS. Directed by Victor Quinaz and written by Anna Martemucci, Victor Quinaz, and Philip Quinaz, the movie was produced by Before the Door Pictures (All Is Lost, Margin Call) and Anonymous Content (Eternal Sunshine of the Spotless Mind). It was released on June 21, 2013, through Oscilloscope Laboratories.

== Plot ==
The night before they are to be married, Phil's (Philip Quinaz) fiancée Alison (Alison Fyhrie) gets cold feet and decides to call off their wedding. But, after breaking his heart, she manages to convince him to go through a sham ceremony, in order to save face in front of their friends and loved ones. Phil readily agrees, secretly hoping that the surprise wedding gift he has lined up for her will help her to reconsider her decision. Neither of them could have prepared themselves for the multitude of random complications that follow once the guests arrived to witness their breakup at a wedding.

== Cast ==
- Alison Fyhrie
- Philip Quinaz
- Victor Quinaz
- Mary Grill
- Chris Manley
- Damian Lanigan
- Anna Martemucci
- Brian Shoaf
- Caitlin Fitzgerald
- Hugh Scully

== Critical reception ==
The movie opened on August 8, 2013, in New York City and was well reviewed by The Village Voice, The New York Times, and New York Post, which gave the film three stars and said: "Breakup at a Wedding works, because Quinaz has come up with a concept that lets him skewer directorial pretension alongside wedding hysteria. He achieves a lot with harsh light, wavering focus and awful framing that occasionally beheads the person on-screen. It takes genuine skill to make a movie look this amusingly cruddy."
