= National Board of Review Awards 2014 =

Annual US film awards ceremony

86th NBR Awards
Best Film: A Most Violent Year

The 86th National Board of Review Awards, honoring the best in film for 2014, were announced on December 2, 2014.

== Top 10 Films ==
Films listed alphabetically except top, which is ranked as Best Film of the Year:

A Most Violent Year

- American Sniper
- Birdman
- Boyhood
- Fury
- Gone Girl
- The Imitation Game
- Inherent Vice
- The Lego Movie
- Nightcrawler
- Unbroken

== Winners ==
Best Film:

- A Most Violent Year

Best Director:

- Clint Eastwood – American Sniper

Best Actor (tie):

- Oscar Isaac – A Most Violent Year
- Michael Keaton – Birdman

Best Actress:

- Julianne Moore – Still Alice

Best Supporting Actor:

- Edward Norton – Birdman

Best Supporting Actress:

- Jessica Chastain – A Most Violent Year

Best Original Screenplay:

- Phil Lord and Christopher Miller – The Lego Movie

Best Adapted Screenplay:

- Paul Thomas Anderson – Inherent Vice

Best Animated Feature:

- How to Train Your Dragon 2

Best Foreign Language Film:

- Wild Tales

Best Documentary:

- Life Itself

Best Ensemble:

- Fury

Breakthrough Performance:

- Jack O'Connell – Starred Up and Unbroken

Best Directorial Debut:

- Gillian Robespierre – Obvious Child

William K. Everson Film History Award:

- Scott Eyman

Spotlight Award:

- Chris Rock for writing, directing, and starring Top Five

NBR Freedom of Expression:

- Rosewater
- Selma

== Top Foreign Films ==
Wild Tales

- Force Majeure
- Gett: The Trial of Viviane Amsalem
- Leviathan
- Two Days, One Night
- We Are the Best!

== Top Documentaries ==
Life Itself

- Art and Craft
- Jodorowsky's Dune
- Keep On Keepin' On
- The Kill Team
- Last Days in Vietnam

== Top Independent Films ==
- Blue Ruin
- Locke
- A Most Wanted Man
- Mr. Turner
- Obvious Child
- The Skeleton Twins
- Snowpiercer
- Stand Clear of the Closing Doors
- Starred Up
- Still Alice
