= Triple Frontier (film) =

2019 film directed by J. C. Chandor

- Official release poster
- Directed by: J. C. Chandor
- Screenplay by: Mark Boal; J. C. Chandor
- Story by: Mark Boal
- Produced by: Charles Roven; Alex Gartner; Andy Horwitz; Neal Dodson
- Starring: Ben Affleck; Oscar Isaac; Charlie Hunnam; Garrett Hedlund; Pedro Pascal
- Cinematography: Roman Vasyanov
- Edited by: Ron Patane
- Music by: Disasterpeace
- Production company: Atlas Entertainment
- Distributed by: Netflix
- Release dates: March 3, 2019 (New York City); March 6, 2019 (United States)
- Running time: 125 minutes
- Country: United States
- Language: English
- Budget: $115 million

Triple Frontier is a 2019 American action-adventure film directed by J. C. Chandor, who co-wrote the screenplay with Mark Boal. The film stars Ben Affleck, Oscar Isaac, Charlie Hunnam, Garrett Hedlund and Pedro Pascal as a group of former U.S. Army Delta Force operators who reunite to plan a heist of a South American crime lord.

The film was released by Netflix in theaters on March 6, 2019, before a worldwide streaming release on March 13, 2019. It received generally favorable reviews from critics.

== Plot ==
Private military advisor Santiago "Pope" Garcia works in Colombia with local police combating drug cartels. An informant named Yovanna asks for his help to smuggle her and her brother out of the country in exchange for drug lord Gabriel Martin Lorea's whereabouts. Yovanna tells Pope that Lorea lives in a remote house in the jungle with $75 million in cash. Pope travels to Florida to recruit his fellow ex-Delta Force teammates, to seize the money under the pretense of working for the government: Tom "Redfly" Davis, a realtor; William "Ironhead" Miller, a motivational speaker; his brother Ben "Benny" Miller, an MMA fighter; and Francisco "Catfish" Morales, a pilot. Pope manages to convince the team to steal the money for themselves.

To minimize casualties, the team infiltrates the house while Lorea's family attends church. They subdue the guards but can't find Lorea or the money. Pope realizes that the money is hidden in the walls, and they find far more than expected. Redfly fixates on the money, demanding that the team continue loading past their exit time until they convince him that they must leave. After loading the money in a van, they do a final sweep for Lorea. He ambushes them and wounds Ironhead, before Pope kills him. The crew tends to Ironhead's wound, as the family returns with the rest of the guards. The crew eliminates the guards, burns down the house, and drives away with $250 million in cash while leaving the family alive.

They rendezvous with Yovanna and her brother at an airfield where Ironhead's contact provides them with a Mil Mi-8 helicopter to reach the getaway boat off the coast of Peru. Catfish doubts that the helicopter can hold their weight with all the money and reach the altitude necessary to cross the Andes Mountains. Unwilling to leave behind any money, Redfly urges Catfish to proceed. They drop Yovanna and her brother off over the border where Redfly aggressively questions her knowledge of them, knowing she could link them to the robbery. Yovanna adamantly denies knowing any of the crew's personal information. Before leaving, Pope gives Yovanna and her brother $3 million and visas to Australia. As the crew departs, an unsatisfied Redfly claims that Yovanna was lying but Pope talks him down.

As they attempt to fly over the mountains, the money's significant weight causes their chopper to crash on a cocaine farm. The farmers become hostile after mistaking the crew for DEA Special Agents, causing Redfly to kill several of them. Pope compensates the village elder for the deaths while Catfish, Ironhead, and Benny prepare mules to transport the money through the mountains.

When they reach the top of the mountain and make their way down, a firefight takes place with two villagers seeking to avenge the deaths of their families. Redfly kills one before the second kills him; Pope subsequently kills the second villager. Disheartened, they proceed towards the ocean with the money and Redfly's body. Benny scouts ahead and reports the getaway boat is still there, but the town is filled with remnants of Lorea's crew waiting for them. They fill their packs with whatever cash they can carry and dump the remainder in a ravine. They attempt to quietly move through the town carrying Redfly's body, but are discovered. After a significant car chase and various shootouts, the team makes it to the boat with Redfly's body.

The team, including Redfly's estate, nets roughly $1.1 million each. As the team sets up payment accounts, feeling guilty that Redfly's greed cost him his life, they sign over their share to Redfly's family.

Pope plans to head to Australia to find Yovanna. Before leaving, Ironhead gives Pope a set of coordinates – the location of the ravine.

== Cast ==
- Ben Affleck as Tom "Redfly" Davis
- Oscar Isaac as Santiago "Pope" Garcia
- Charlie Hunnam as William "Ironhead" Miller
- Garrett Hedlund as Benjamin "Ben / Benny" Miller
- Pedro Pascal as Francisco "Catfish" Morales
- Adria Arjona as Yovanna

== Production ==
In October 2010, Tom Hanks and Johnny Depp entered talks to join the cast of the film, to be directed by Kathryn Bigelow from a screenplay by Boal with shooting set to commence in early 2011. In November 2010, Hanks officially was cast. However, Bigelow and Boal decided to film Zero Dark Thirty (2012) instead due to scheduling conflicts and the film went into turnaround. In June 2015, it was announced that Chandor was in talks to direct the film for Paramount Pictures, while Bigelow left because she wanted to focus on her film about Bowe Bergdahl (ultimately dropped in favor of Detroit). Both Hanks and Will Smith were in talks for the lead roles. The film, alternately titled Sleeping Dogs, would be produced by Roven and Alex Gartner through Atlas Entertainment. In September 2015, Chandor officially signed on to direct the film. On January 20, 2016, it was reported that Depp was again in early talks to star in it, while Hanks' attachment was yet to be confirmed, and Smith had left due to scheduling conflicts filming Collateral Beauty.

In January 2017, it was reported that Channing Tatum and Tom Hardy were in talks to join the film, with Depp and Hanks no longer up for roles. In February 2017, Mahershala Ali joined the cast, with Tatum and Hardy also officially signed on. On April 12, 2017, a month before shooting was set to commence, it was reported that Triple Frontier had been dropped by Paramount, and Tatum and Hardy no longer would be a part of the cast, while Ali and Arjona were still attached to star. The film was put into a turnaround.

On May 1, 2017, it was reported that Netflix was in negotiations to acquire the rights to the film with Ben Affleck and Casey Affleck in negotiations for the roles Hardy and Tatum vacated, with Ali and Arjona remaining on the project. Ben Affleck exited the film in early July 2017, for personal reasons. On July 26, 2017, it was reported that Mark Wahlberg was in talks to join the film in the role Affleck vacated, along with Hunnam, Hedlund, and Pascal, with Arjona still attached to the project. Principal production was set to commence in August 2017, in Hawaii and Colombia.

On March 19, 2018, it was announced that Triple Frontier would commence principal production on March 26, 2018, in Oahu, Hawaii. Ben Affleck had signed back on to star, cast with Isaac, Hunnam, Hedlund, Pascal, and Arjona. Ali had been forced to drop out of the project when production was delayed.

The film's name, Triple Frontier, refers to the Tres Fronteras area of South America, which is known for its high levels of trafficking in drugs and contraband.

=== Music ===
Disasterpeace composed the film score. The soundtrack was released by Milan Records.

== Release ==
The film's world premiere was held in New York City on March 3, 2019. It was released in select theaters on March 6, before its worldwide Netflix release a week later on March 13. On April 16, 2019, Netflix announced that the film had been viewed by over 52 million viewers on its service within its first month of release. On July 5, 2019, Netflix announced that the film had been viewed by over 63 million viewers since its release on the service.

== Critical response ==
On the review aggregator website Rotten Tomatoes, 71% of 140 critics' reviews are positive, with an average rating of 6.4/10. The website's consensus reads: "An outstanding cast and ambitious story help Triple Frontier overcome an uneven narrative—and elevate the end result above a crowded field of grim and gritty heist thrillers." Metacritic, which uses a weighted average, assigned the film a score of 61 out of 100, based on 26 critics, indicating "generally favorable" reviews.

Writing for the Chicago Sun-Times, Richard Roeper gave the film three-and-a-half stars out of four, and writing: "From the direction to the script to the production elements to the performances, Triple Frontier is a first-class ride." Entertainment Weekly's Chris Nashawaty gave the film a "B" and wrote that "suffice it to say that Chandor, Boal, and their gruff band of he-men never let things slacken. There may be no honor among thieves, but Triple Frontier certainly makes watching them pretty entertaining."
