= Stephanie Palmer =

- Born: Alexandria, Virginia, U.S.
- Education: Carnegie Mellon University (BFA)
- Occupations: Author, Consultant, Pitching Expert, Development Executive
- Organization: Good in a Room
- Website: stephaniepalmer.com

Stephanie Palmer is a consultant, development executive, and author. In 2005, she founded Good in a Room, a consulting company and blog that helps professionals inside and outside the film industry learn to pitch and advance their projects.

== Early life ==
She grew up in Alexandria, Virginia and went to college at Carnegie Mellon University where she received a B.F.A in Theatre Directing.

== Film industry ==
She started her career in the film industry as an unpaid intern on Titanic before becoming an assistant at Jerry Bruckheimer Films where she worked on Armageddon, Con Air, and Enemy of the State. After that, she moved to MGM where she became Director of Creative Affairs. In this position, she supervised the acquisition, development, and production of feature films including 21, Legally Blonde, Be Cool, The Brothers Grimm, Agent Cody Banks, Agent Cody Banks 2, A Guy Thing and Good Boy!

The Hollywood Reporter named her one of the top 35 executives under 35.

== Good in a Room ==
=== Company ===
In 2005, she left MGM and launched Good in a Room, a consulting company where she helps professionals inside and outside the film industry learn to pitch and advance their projects.

She leads workshops and gives presentations for companies and organizations such as Google, William Morris Endeavor, Merrill Lynch, Disney, UCLA, University of Southern California, Warner Bros., National Speakers Association Graduate School, and the Great American Pitchfest. She also is the moderator for the American Film Market's Annual Pitch Conference.

In 2013, she began offering an online webinar called "Pitching Essentials" which is aimed at helping TV writers, screenwriters, and filmmakers develop their pitching skills.

=== Book and blog ===
In 2008, she authored the book Good in a Room, published by Random House, which features several techniques to pitch or sell things. These techniques break down a pitch into parts and explain how to progress through a meeting.

In 2012, she launched the blog "Good in a Room." In her blog, she shows effective pitches from the film, TV, advertising, and venture capital industries and provides tips to help creative professionals learn to pitch more successfully.

== Media appearances ==
She has been featured on the Today Show on NBC, The Early Show on CBS, National Public Radio, Expert Access Radio, and in the Los Angeles Times, Variety, The Hollywood Reporter, Inc., The Atlantic, Speaker, and Script magazines.
