= A Most Violent Year =

2014 film by J. C. Chandor

- Theatrical release poster
- Directed by: J. C. Chandor
- Written by: J. C. Chandor
- Produced by: Neal Dodson; Anna Gerb; J. C. Chandor
- Starring: Oscar Isaac; Jessica Chastain; David Oyelowo; Alessandro Nivola; Albert Brooks
- Cinematography: Bradford Young
- Edited by: Ron Patane
- Music by: Alex Ebert
- Production companies: Participant Media; Imagenation Abu Dhabi; FilmNation Entertainment; Before the Door Pictures; Washington Square Films; Old Bull Pictures
- Distributed by: A24
- Release dates: November 6, 2014 (AFI Fest); December 31, 2014 (United States)
- Running time: 125 minutes
- Countries: United States; United Arab Emirates
- Language: English
- Budget: $20 million
- Box office: $12 million

A Most Violent Year is a 2014 crime drama film written and directed by J. C. Chandor, who also co-produced with Neal Dodson and Anna Gerb. It stars Oscar Isaac as a fuel supplier who tries to adhere to his own moral compass amid the rampant violence, corruption and decay that threaten his family and business. The film also stars Jessica Chastain, David Oyelowo, Alessandro Nivola, and Albert Brooks.

A Most Violent Year premiered as the opening film of the 28th AFI Fest on November 6, 2014, and was theatrically released by A24 on December 31, 2014. It won Best Film, Best Actor for Isaac, and Best Supporting Actress for Chastain at the 86th National Board of Review Awards. Among other accolades, Chastain was also nominated for Best Supporting Actress at the 20th Critics' Choice Awards and the 72nd Golden Globe Awards. Despite a budget of $20 million, it had a very limited domestic release, initially showing at only four U.S. theaters before expanding nationwide the following month.

== Plot ==
In 1981 New York City, oil company owner Abel Morales has had several delivery trucks hijacked. Driver Julian is severely beaten by two hijackers. Abel's wife Anna begs Abel to fight violence with violence, but he refuses. Morales and his company are under investigation by Assistant District Attorney Lawrence, who seems determined to expose price fixing, tax evasion, and various other illegalities in the heating oil business.

Morales's attorney, Andrew Walsh, brokers a deal with a group of Hasidic Jews headed by Joseph Mendelsohn to purchase a fuel oil terminal on the East River for $2.5 million. Morales makes a large down payment with the understanding that he will close in 30 days or lose his money.

After moving into a new home, Morales chases an intruder, then finds a dropped gun. He confronts his competitors but they deny involvement. A Teamsters boss suggests Morales's drivers should carry handguns with fake permits. Morales refuses, fearing for his legitimate business reputation.

Julian is again accosted by hijackers, and they shoot at each other. The police chase Julian and the others, who all escape. Morales's bank says that, due to the impending criminal indictments and this violent incident, it can no longer finance his purchase of the terminal.

Morales gets a loan from competitors Saul and Lorraine Lefkowitz in exchange for partial use of the terminal, but it won't cover the entire purchase. Morales raises more money by taking out a mortgage on a building he owns with his younger brother. Another hijacking is reported, and he stops the stolen truck. The hijacker says he sells the oil in Far Rockaway. Morales confronts a competitor who has facilities in Far Rockaway, threatening to call the authorities. Morales is paid for the stolen oil but is still $600,000 short of the purchase price.

Morales visits another competitor, Mafia-affiliated Peter Forente, to ask for the remaining money. Forente warns him that any such loan will be on onerous terms and tells him to think things through before committing to it. Dismayed, Morales tells Anna about Peter's terms and she confesses that she has been skimming from the company for years, storing the money in a secret account. Anna convinces Abel to use this money instead of a loan from Forente.

Morales and Walsh pay the note and take possession of the terminal. Julian arrives carrying a gun, clearly unstable and bemoaning his circumstances. After a brief exchange and a request that Morales take care of his family, Julian kills himself. Morales tells Lawrence that the broader investigations into his firm are hurting his business, and that they should find a conclusion at some point. Lawrence agrees in general terms and suggests that the new oil terminal will develop Morales's business and give him "political influence." Lawrence then hints that Morales might be able to help him with his higher aspirations. Morales claims that he has always taken the path that is "most right".

== Cast ==
- Oscar Isaac as Abel Morales
- Jessica Chastain as Anna Morales
- Alessandro Nivola as Peter Forente
- David Oyelowo as Lawrence
- Albert Brooks as Andrew Walsh
- Robert Clohessy as Mr. Rose
- Catalina Sandino Moreno as Luisa
- Ashley Williams as Lange
- Elyes Gabel as Julian
- Jerry Adler as Joseph Mendelsohn
- Christopher Abbott as Louis Servidio
- Elizabeth Marvel as Mrs. Rose
- Peter Gerety as Bill O'Leary
- Glenn Fleshler as Arnold Kline
- David Margulies as Saul Lefkowitz
- Annie Funke as Lorraine Lefkowitz
- Patrick Breen as an instructor
- Matthew Maher as John Dominczyk
- Jason Ralph as Ian Thompson
- Jimmy Palumbo as Barber Jimmy O
- Daisy Tahan as Annie Morales
- Giselle Eisenberg as Catherine Morales

== Production ==
On May 23, 2013, Deadline reported that filmmaker J. C. Chandor would write and direct A Most Violent Year, which was to begin shooting in the fall. Neal Dodson and Anna Gerb co-produced the film along with FilmNation Entertainment's Glen Basner as executive producer. On January 22, 2014, A24 acquired the U.S. distribution rights to the film, which A24 then scheduled for release in the fourth quarter of 2014. The film was co-financed by Image Nation and Participant Media, and produced by Before the Door Pictures and Washington Square Films.

=== Casting ===
On June 5, 2013, Javier Bardem joined the film to play the lead. On July 16, 2013, Jessica Chastain joined the cast to play the lead role along with Bardem. In December 2013, Oscar Isaac officially replaced Bardem, who had dropped out due to creative differences. On January 27, 2014, Albert Brooks joined the film, playing Isaac's character's attorney, and actress Catalina Sandino Moreno also joined the film in a supporting role. On January 29, 2014, while the film's shooting was underway, David Oyelowo joined the cast. Other cast members include Ashley Williams, Elyes Gabel, Harris Yulin, Giselle Eisenberg, and Elizabeth Marvel. On February 21, 2014, Alessandro Nivola was cast to play Peter Forente, a heating oil distributor who is a competitor to Isaac's character.

=== Filming ===
Principal photography began on January 29, 2014, in New York City.

=== Music ===
The musical score for A Most Violent Year was composed by Alex Ebert, who previously collaborated with director Chandor on All Is Lost (2013). Influenced musically by the culture and life of the 1980s, specifically thinking of Miami Vice and Scarface, Ebert predominantly utilized synthesizers. "It's a synthesis of sort-of calling-card themes and extended atmospheres. There’s horns and flutes and strings, but there’s also sort of these meditative synthetic beds underlying."

A soundtrack album was released by Community Music on December 16, 2014.

== Release ==
The film made its world premiere as the opening film of the 28th AFI Fest on November 6, 2014, at the Dolby Theatre in Hollywood. It received a limited initial release in four United States theaters on December 31, 2014, later expanding to theaters nationwide. The film was distributed by A24 in the United States and by Icon Film Distribution in the United Kingdom.

== Reception ==
=== Critical response ===
A Most Violent Year received critical acclaim, with many comparing Chandor's style in this film favorably to the works of Sidney Lumet, and praise given to the performances of Oscar Isaac and Jessica Chastain. On the review aggregator website Rotten Tomatoes, the film has an approval rating of 89% based on 227 reviews, with an average rating of 7.8/10. The website's consensus reads: "Gritty, gripping, and weighted with thought-provoking heft, A Most Violent Year represents another strong entry in writer-director J.C. Chandor's impressive filmography." Metacritic, which uses a weighted average, assigned the film a score of 79 out of 100, based on 44 critics, indicating "generally favorable" reviews.

Business Insider's Brett Arnold wrote that the movie "may be slow, but it's never dull." Variety's Scott Foundas compared it to Chandor's previous film saying the movie is "a tough, gritty, richly atmospheric thriller that lacks some of the formal razzle-dazzle of his solo seafaring epic, All Is Lost, but makes up for it with an impressively sustained low-boil tension and the skillful navigating of a complex plot." The Wrap's Alonso Duralde praised the director, proclaiming that Chandor "firmly plants himself among this generation's great filmmakers."

=== Top-ten lists ===
A Most Violent Year was listed on many critics' top 10 lists.

- 1st – Christopher Orr, The Atlantic
- 3rd – Brian Tallerico, RogerEbert.com
- 3rd – Mick LaSalle, San Francisco Chronicle
- 5th – Joe Neumaier, New York Daily News
- 6th – Kristopher Tapley, HitFix
- 7th – Kimberly Jones, Austin Chronicle
- 8th – Gregory Ellwood, HitFix
- 8th – Todd McCarthy, The Hollywood Reporter
- 9th – Alonso Duralde, TheWrap
- 9th – Christy Lemire, RogerEbert.com
- 9th – Bill Goodykoontz, The Arizona Republic
- 9th – Richard Roeper, Chicago Sun-Times
- 9th – Betsy Sharkey, Los Angeles Times (tied with Inherent Vice)
- Top 10 (ranked alphabetically) – David Denby, The New Yorker
- Top 10 (ranked alphabetically) – Calvin Wilson, St. Louis Post-Dispatch
- Best of 2014 (listed alphabetically, not ranked) – Kenneth Turan, Los Angeles Times

=== Accolades ===
Award	Date of Ceremony	Category	Recipient(s)	Result	Ref.
Central Ohio Film Critics Association	January 8, 2015	Best Film	A Most Violent Year	9th Place	
Central Ohio Film Critics Association	January 8, 2015	Best Supporting Actress	Jessica Chastain	Nominated	
Central Ohio Film Critics Association	January 8, 2015	Best Original Screenplay	J. C. Chandor	Nominated	
Central Ohio Film Critics Association	January 8, 2015	Actor of the Year	Jessica Chastain	Nominated	
Golden Globe Awards	January 11, 2015	Best Supporting Actress	Jessica Chastain	Nominated	
Chicago Film Critics Association	December 15, 2014	Best Supporting Actress	Jessica Chastain	Nominated	
Critics' Choice Movie Awards	January 11, 2015	Best Supporting Actress	Jessica Chastain	Nominated	
Dallas–Fort Worth Film Critics Association	December 15, 2014	Best Supporting Actress	Jessica Chastain	4th Place	
Florida Film Critics Circle	December 19, 2014	Best Supporting Actress	Jessica Chastain	3rd Place	
Georgia Film Critics Association	January 9, 2015	Best Picture	A Most Violent Year	Nominated	
Georgia Film Critics Association	January 9, 2015	Best Supporting Actress	Jessica Chastain	Nominated	
Gotham Awards	December 1, 2014	Best Actor	Oscar Isaac	Nominated	
Houston Film Critics Society	January 10, 2015	Best Picture		Nominated	
Houston Film Critics Society	January 10, 2015	Best Supporting Actress	Jessica Chastain	Nominated	
Independent Spirit Awards	February 21, 2015	Best Supporting Actress	Jessica Chastain	Nominated	
Independent Spirit Awards	February 21, 2015	Best Screenplay	J. C. Chandor	Nominated	
Independent Spirit Awards	February 21, 2015	Best Editing	Ron Patane	Nominated	
Indiana Film Journalists Association	December 15, 2014	Top 10 Films		Won	
Indiana Film Journalists Association	December 15, 2014	Best Supporting Actress	Jessica Chastain	Won	
Iowa Film Critics	January 7, 2015	Best Movie Yet to Open in Iowa	A Most Violent Year (tied with American Sniper)	Tied	
London Film Critics' Circle	January 18, 2015	Best Supporting Actress	Jessica Chastain	Nominated	
London Film Critics' Circle	January 18, 2015	Technical Achievement Award	Kasia Walicka-Maimone (costumes)	Nominated	
National Board of Review	December 2, 2014	Best Film	Neal Dodson, Anna Gerb, J. C. Chandor	Won	
National Board of Review	December 2, 2014	Best Actor	Oscar Isaac (tied with Michael Keaton for Birdman)	Tied	
National Board of Review	December 2, 2014	Best Supporting Actress	Jessica Chastain	Won	
New York Film Critics Online	December 7, 2014	Top Ten Films		Won	
Oklahoma Film Critics Circle	January 5, 2015	Best Picture		9th Place	
Online Film Critics Society	December 15, 2014	Best Supporting Actress	Jessica Chastain	Nominated	
Phoenix Film Critics Society	December 16, 2014	Best Film		Nominated	
Phoenix Film Critics Society	December 16, 2014	Top 10 Films		Won	
Phoenix Film Critics Society	December 16, 2014	Best Supporting Actress	Jessica Chastain	Nominated	
Phoenix Film Critics Society	December 16, 2014	Best Original Screenplay	J. C. Chandor	Nominated	
Phoenix Film Critics Society	December 16, 2014	Best Cinematography	Bradford Young	Nominated	
San Francisco Film Critics Circle Awards	December 14, 2014	Best Supporting Actress	Jessica Chastain	Nominated	
San Francisco Film Critics Circle Awards	December 14, 2014	Best Original Screenplay	J. C. Chandor	Nominated	
St. Louis Gateway Film Critics Association	December 15, 2014	Best Supporting Actress	Jessica Chastain	Nominated	
Utah Film Critics Association	December 17, 2014	Best Supporting Actress	Jessica Chastain	Won	
Washington D.C. Area Film Critics Association	February 21, 2015	Best Supporting Actress	Jessica Chastain	Nominated	
Washington D.C. Area Film Critics Association	February 21, 2015	Best Actor	Oscar Isaac	Nominated	
Whistler Film Festival	December 10, 2014	Audience Award	A Most Violent Year	Won	
