= Alexa Meade =

American painter

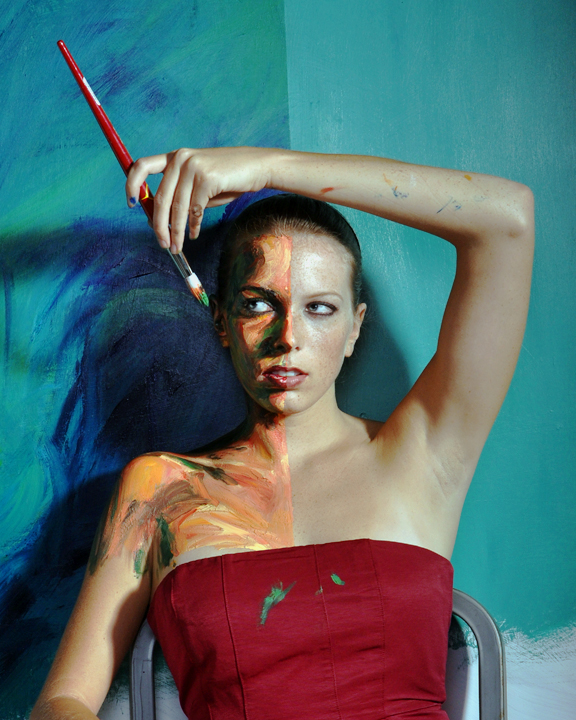
- Meade in the self-portrait Double Take
- Born: 1986 (age 39–40); Washington, D.C.
- Education: Vassar College
- Known for: Installation art, painting, photography
- Notable work: Body painting Ariana Grande, Color of Reality, Wonderland Dreams on Fifth Avenue
- Awards: TED Speaker, Tribeca Film Festival – "Disruptive Innovation Award", Perimeter Institute for Theoretical Physics – "Artist in Residence", Google - Artist in Residence, World Trade Center - “Artist in Residence”
- Website: alexameade.com

Alexa Meade (born 1986) is an American installation artist best known for her portraits painted directly onto the human body and inanimate objects in a way that collapses depth and makes her models appear two-dimensional when photographed. Her work was described by American media organization NPR as "portraiture in triplicate: A photo of a painting of a person, and the real person hidden somewhere underneath." One of her notable projects was painting singer Ariana Grande’s body for her 2018 video “God is a Woman".

== Early life and education ==
Meade was born in Washington, D.C., and raised in Chevy Chase, Maryland. She graduated from Vassar College in Poughkeepsie, New York, in 2009, with a bachelor's degree in political science. Initially planning on a path in politics, she interned for congressmen and senators on Capitol Hill, and then worked as a press assistant on Barack Obama's 2008 presidential campaign.

== Career ==
=== Early inspiration and paintings ===
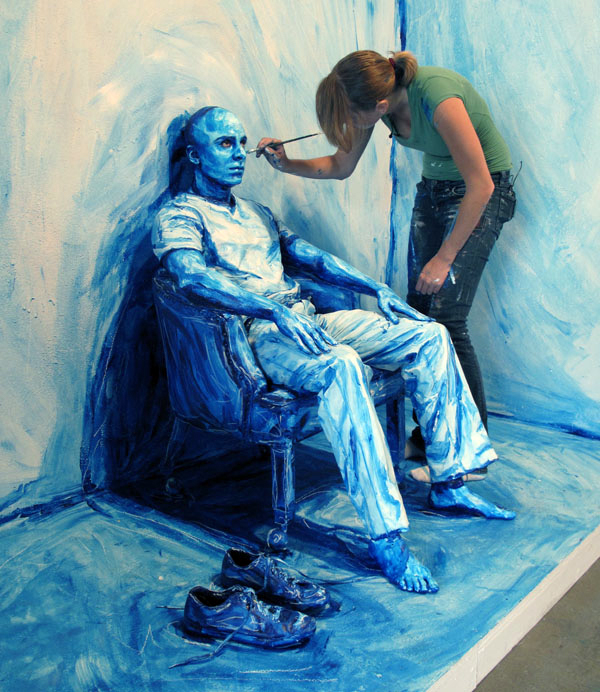
Painting one of her living subjects

In 2009, an assignment in an elective art class at Vassar College sparked Meade's curiosity. She decided to explore space and light through the idea of putting black paint on the ground where the shadows were cast. She later expanded the concept by making a grayscale "mapping of light" with paint on the human body. In so doing, she realized that she had made the three-dimensional form appear to be a two-dimensional painting. The results of these experiments changed her perspective and inspired her to reevaluate her career goals. Despite having grown up surrounded by the political culture of Washington D.C. and initially planning to enter that field herself, as Meade says, “I just felt like even though this was supposed to be my dream, it didn’t quite fit with who I thought I was on the inside.”

After graduation, she honed her technique in her parents’ Washington, D.C. basement by practicing painting on inanimate objects including grapefruits, fried eggs and sausage. She has credited her lack of formal art training with allowing her to come up with unique ideas of surfaces she could paint on, since she didn't think of painting as something that necessarily had to be done on a canvas.

Meade first gained public recognition in March 2010, when her living paintings went viral following a short post about her work on Jason Kottke's blog kottke.org. She soon received coverage on CNN and elsewhere. Her website went from having negligible views to an estimated 30,000-page views the next day. Her most famous artwork at the time, "Transit," features an older man Meade painted on in her basement studio, and then photographed riding the Washington, D.C. metro, looking "as if a painting from the National Portrait Gallery has leapt off its wall to go walking through the flesh-and-blood world. Her speech at the 2013 TEDGlobal conference in Edinburgh, Scotland, "Your Body is my Canvas," offers a behind the scenes look at her work, and details her career beginnings. She has named installation artist Robert Irwin as an inspiration, citing his biography, Seeing is Forgetting the Name of the Thing One Sees, as an influence on how she thinks about the perception of space.

=== Color of Reality ===
Color of Reality In 2016, Meade painted dancers Jon Boogz and Lil Buck for the short film Color of Reality produced by Animi Design. Color of Reality explores a story about gun violence and racial tensions in America as expressed through painting and dance. Dancer Lil Buck performed his unique style of dancing called Memphis Jookin’, which is a combination of ballet and street dancing. The short film was critically acclaimed in the press, with The New York Times art critic Gia Kourlas writing: “Think of it as a van Gogh—that is, if one of his paintings were brought to life as a performative protest.” The film was screened at Lincoln Center, the Apollo Theater, and the Hammer Museum. It won CNN Great Big Story's Art as Impact Award, and was included in the National Civil Rights Museum’s Freedom Awards Ceremony.

=== "God Is a Woman" ===
In 2018, Meade painted on singer Ariana Grande for the music video of her 2018 single "God Is a Woman". Grande’s music video director Dave Meyers had seen Meade and Sheila Vand’s project Milk: What Will You Make of Me? (in which Vand, bodypainted by Meade, lay in a tub of milk, the colors of the paint eventually dispersing and creating patterns throughout the milk) and approached both artists with the idea of bodypainting Grande in a milky pool of paint. The piece shows Grande, nude except for Meade’s paint in shades of lavender, blue and white, floating in a pool as the colors swirl around her. Allure called it "Some of the most gorgeous imagery...striking, empowering." Meade's painted aesthetic set off a beauty and makeup trend, as thousands of people created inspired tribute art.

=== Wonderland Dreams on 5th Avenue ===
In the fall of 2022, Meade’s immersive, interactive exhibit, Wonderland Dreams, opened on Fifth Avenue in Midtown Manhattan. Taking over the former Best Buy space, it took Meade two months, and 2,000 gallons of paint to transform the 26,000 square-foot venue. Using her trademark 3D painting style, Meade created a 2D dreamscape with live, hand-painted models. Over 100,000 visitors participated in the year-long run of Wonderland Dreams.

=== Fifth Avenue Portrait Collection ===
In 2023, following Wonderland Dreams was the Fifth Avenue Portrait Collection also painted by Meade. The public art exhibit spanned 180 feet on Fifth Avenue and 44th street. The collection featured 12 foot tall colorful living portraits of New Yorkers including Tony Award-Winning actors such as J. Harrison Ghee and Brian Stokes Mitchell.

=== Artist in residences ===
In 2015, Meade was invited to be artist in residence at the Perimeter Institute for Theoretical Physics in Waterloo, Ontario. For this interdisciplinary project, Meade was given free rein to pursue a period of self-directed study of theoretical and quantum physics, and in return she created a collaborative art installation piece with the researchers. She was artist in residence at Google where she collaborated on an installation with engineers developing Light Field technology. In 2023, Meade was selected as the artist in residence at 3 World Trade Center.

=== Depth perception research ===
Alexa Meade's art is still a subject of research and terminology development. In August, 2019, Scientific American wrote: "“Meade’s unique work illustrates that depth perception is always a brain construct, not only in art but also in life. Because our retinas are fundamentally flat surfaces, our neurons must infer the third dimension from cues such as shadows, perspective lines or the relative sizes of objects—both in paintings and in everyday perception. Meade’s artful application of paint disrupts this brain process.”

=== Public speaking and symposia ===
In 2013, she gave a speech at the TEDGlobal conference in Edinburgh, Scotland, Your Body is my Canvas, in which she offered a behind the scenes look at her work and described the beginning of her career in detail.

In 2016 at the Q3 Symposium and Lecture on Peace and Security in a Quantum Age held in Sydney, Australia, Meade joined quantum physicists and scholars to debate the political, ethical and philosophical implications of quantum computing.

In 2018–2019, she was a keynote lecturer at Stanford University for Celebration of Mind, a colloquium about the intersection of math, magic, and art. Meade also lectured at Princeton University in the Computer Science Department on the subject "Painting in More Dimensions".

=== Other projects ===
In 2010, Meade’s work was exhibited at the Saatchi Gallery in London. In 2012, Meade created a live performance at the Smithsonian National Portrait Gallery in Washington, D.C. for the exhibit Camera-Ready Color. In 2014, she joined the musician Avicii and others as part of the Project Warehouse campaign for former Ralph Lauren brand Denim & Supply. As part of the project, she painted large-scale public art installations in Madrid, Santa Monica and Toronto. In 2015, Meade created several artworks in Paris, France, including exhibitions at the Grand Palais and the Pinacothèque de Paris, and a live performance at David Lynch's nightclub Silencio. In 2016, Meade was invited to the White House under President Barack Obama for the South by South Lawn (SXSL) event showcasing creators and innovators. In 2017, Meade went on tour with Refinery29’s installation exhibit 29Rooms. Also in 2017, Meade was commissioned by Meta (formerly Facebook) for the Cannes Lions International Festival of Creativity. Meade painted objects and people and staged them to appear two-dimensional when photographed. Her exhibition Immersed in Wonderland in Beverly Hills was attended by 40, 000 visitors in 2018.

== Awards and honours ==
In 2017, Meade was honored by the Tribeca Film Festival with the Disruptive Innovation Award, an honor celebrating those who "inspire and empower people towards innovative thinking and creative activism".

Meade was selected by Google Arts & Culture, guided by Frida Kahlo’s great-niece, Cristina Kahlo, to create artwork for "Faces of Frida" celebrating the famed Mexican portrait painter's life and her legacy carried on by women today.
