= J. C. Chandor =

American filmmaker (born 1973)

- Born: Jeffrey McDonald Chandor; November 24, 1973 (age 52); Morristown, New Jersey, U.S.
- Education: College of Wooster
- Occupations: Film director; film producer; screenwriter
- Years active: 2002–present
- Notable work: Margin Call (2011); All Is Lost (2013); A Most Violent Year (2014)
- Spouse: Mary Cameron Goodyear (m. 2004)

Jeffrey McDonald "J. C." Chandor (/ˈʃændɔːr/; born November 24, 1973) is an American filmmaker, best known for writing and directing the critically acclaimed films Margin Call (2011), All Is Lost (2013), and A Most Violent Year (2014). His accolades include nominations for the Academy Awards, the Golden Bear and a National Board of Review victory for Best Picture.

== Early life and education ==
Chandor grew up in the Basking Ridge section of Bernards Township, New Jersey. He is the son of Mary (McDonald) and Jeff Chandor, an investment banker. After graduating in 1992 from Ridge High School in Bernards Township, he received his bachelor's degree in 1996 from The College of Wooster. During the 15 years leading up to Margin Call, Chandor directed commercials.

== Film career ==
Margin Call was Chandor's first feature-length film. The film premiered at the 2011 Sundance Film Festival in Park City, Utah; it also played In Competition at the 61st Berlin International Film Festival and was nominated for the Golden Bear. Margin Call was nominated for four Independent Spirit Awards and won two of them: for Best First Feature and the Robert Altman Award for Best Cast. Chandor was also nominated for the Academy Award for Best Original Screenplay.

His second feature film All Is Lost was screened Out of Competition at the 2013 Cannes Film Festival. It received critical acclaim, especially for Robert Redford's solo performance which featured almost no dialogue, for which Redford won the New York Film Critics Circle Award for Best Actor, and was nominated for the Golden Globe Award and Critics' Choice Award. The film was also nominated for an Academy Award for Best Sound Editing.

In 2014, Chandor directed Oscar Isaac and Jessica Chastain in A Most Violent Year, which was nominated for a Golden Globe and Independent Spirit Award and which won three National Board of Review awards: Best Actor, Best Supporting Actress, and Best Picture for Chandor and his producing partners Neal Dodson and Anna Gerb.

In 2015, Chandor replaced Kathryn Bigelow as director for the crime film Triple Frontier. The film was released on Netflix in March 2019 to generally favorable reviews. In 2017, he signed a first look deal with Gaumont.

In 2020, it was announced that Chandor would direct Kraven the Hunter for Sony's Spider-Man Universe. In August 2023, it was revealed that he also provided "additional literary material" for the film.

In 2024, Deadline reported that Chandor had closed a deal with Sony Pictures to direct an original contemporary drama he has written, which will likely be his next film as a director. This came after Sony was impressed with Chandor's latest cut of Kraven the Hunter.

Chandor runs the production company CounterNarrative Films with producers Neal Dodson and Anna Gerb in New York City.

== Filmography ==
Short film

Year	Title	Director	Writer	Producer
2004	Despacito	Yes	Yes	Yes

Feature film

Year	Title	Director	Writer	Producer
2011	Margin Call	Yes	Yes	No
2013	All Is Lost	Yes	Yes	No
2014	A Most Violent Year	Yes	Yes	Yes
2019	Triple Frontier	Yes	Yes	No
2024	Kraven the Hunter	Yes	No	No

Producer

- Viper Club (2018)

Executive producer

- So Good to See You (2016) (short film)
- The Con Is On (2018)
- Monos (2019)
- Run This Town (2019)

== Awards and nominations ==
Year	Title	Award/Nomination
2011	Margin Call	Nominated - Academy Awards Best Original Screenplay Nominated - 61st Berlin International Film Festival Golden Bear (Best Film) Nominated - Boston Society of Film Critics Best New Director Won - National Board of Review Best Directorial Debut Won - Independent Spirit Awards Best First Film Won - New York Film Critics Circle Awards Best First Film Won - San Francisco Film Critics Circle Awards Best Screenplay
2013	All Is Lost	Nominated - Satellite Awards Best Film Nominated - Independent Spirit Awards Best Film + Best Director Nominated - 13th AARP Movies Awards Best Film Won - 39th American Film Festival Best Film
2014	A Most Violent Year	Won - 86th National Board of Review Best Film Won - New York Film Critics Top 10 Films of the year Won - Whistler Film Festival Best Film (Audience Award) Nominated - San Francisco Film Critics Circle Best Original Screenplay Nominated - Independent Spirit Awards Best Screenplay Nominated - Houston Film Critics Society Best Film Nominated - London Film Critics' Circle Technical Achievement
2019	Triple Frontier	Nominated - IGN Awards Best Action Film Nominated - People’s Choice Awards Best Film (Drama) Nominated - California Film Commission California on Location Award for Team of the Year (Studio Feature Film)
