= All Is Lost =

2013 film by J. C. Chandor

- Theatrical release poster
- Directed by: J. C. Chandor
- Written by: J. C. Chandor
- Produced by: Justin Nappi; Teddy Schwarzman; Neal Dodson; Anna Gerb
- Starring: Robert Redford
- Cinematography: Frank G. DeMarco
- Edited by: Pete Beaudreau
- Music by: Alex Ebert
- Production companies: Black Bear Pictures; Treehouse Pictures; Before the Door Pictures; Washington Square Films; Sudden Storm Productions
- Distributed by: Lionsgate; Roadside Attractions (US); FilmNation Entertainment (International)
- Release dates: 22 May 2013 (Cannes); 25 October 2013 (North America)
- Running time: 105 minutes
- Countries: Canada; United States
- Budget: $8.5 million
- Box office: $13.6 million

All Is Lost is a 2013 survival drama film written and directed by J. C. Chandor. The film stars Robert Redford as a man lost at sea. (Note: Redford is credited as "Our Man", but the character is not named in the film.) Redford is the only cast member, and the film has only 51 spoken English words. All Is Lost is Chandor's second feature film, following his 2011 debut Margin Call. It screened Out of Competition at the 2013 Cannes Film Festival.

The title of the film is a nod to E. W. Hornung's observation that when courage is lost, "all is lost".

Among many honors, the film was nominated for an Oscar for Best Sound Editing (Steve Boeddeker and Richard Hymns) and won the Golden Globe Award for Best Original Score (Alex Ebert). Redford was nominated for his own Golden Globe and won the New York Film Critics Circle Award for Best Actor.

== Plot ==
A man narrates a letter addressing people he will miss.

In the Indian Ocean eight days earlier, the man wakes to find water flooding his boat. It has collided with a wayward shipping container, ripping a hole in the hull. The man uses a sea anchor to dislodge the container, then changes tack to raise the hole out of the water. He patches the hole and uses a manual bilge pump to remove the water from the cabin. The boat's navigational and communications systems have been damaged by saltwater intrusion. The man tries to repair the marine radio and connects it to one of the boat's batteries. When he climbs the mast to repair an antenna lead, he sees an oncoming tropical storm.

When the storm arrives, the man runs before the wind. He intends to heave to, but as he crawls to the bow to hoist the storm jib, he is thrown overboard and regains the deck only after a desperate struggle. The boat capsizes and rights itself; during a second roll, which throws the man overboard again, the boat is dis-masted and most of the equipment is destroyed. After going below deck and being knocked out by colliding with a post, he regains consciousness to find the boat sinking, so he abandons ship in an inflatable life raft. When the storm has passed, he salvages whatever he can from his sinking boat and transfers it to the raft. Before the boat sinks, he tends to the gash on his forehead.

As the man learns to operate a sextant, he discovers he is being pulled towards a major shipping lane by ocean currents. He survives another storm, but his supplies dwindle and he learns too late that his drinking water has been contaminated with sea water. He improvises a solar still from his water container, a plastic bag, and an aluminum can, producing fresh water, and he snags a fish, but it is snapped up by a shark before he can reel it in.

The man's raft is passed by two container ships, but it is unseen despite his using signal flares. He drifts out of the shipping lane with no food or water. On the eighth day, he writes a letter, puts it in a jar, and throws it into the ocean as a message in a bottle. Later that night, he sees a light in the distance. He uses pages from his journal along with charts to create a signal fire. The fire grows out of control and consumes his raft. Falling into the water, he loses hope and attempts to drown himself. Underwater, he sees the hull of a boat with a search light approaching his burning raft. He swims towards the surface to grasp an outstretched hand.

== Production ==
=== Development ===
All Is Lost was written and directed by J. C. Chandor, his second feature film, following 2011's Margin Call. Chandor developed the idea for All Is Lost during his time commuting from Providence, Rhode Island, to New York City. After meeting Robert Redford at the 2011 Sundance Film Festival, where Margin Call premiered, Chandor asked the veteran actor to be in the film. On 9 February 2012, Redford was confirmed as All Is Lost's only cast member. With only one character, the film has no dialogue, although there are a few spoken lines. The shooting script was only 31 pages long.

=== Filming ===
Principal photography began in mid-2012 at Baja Studios in Rosarito Beach in Mexico. Baja Studios was originally built for the 1997 film Titanic. Filming took place for two months in the location's water tank. In addition the crew spent "two or three days" filming in the actual ocean. Chandor would later remark that completing the film was "essentially a jigsaw puzzle" and that the crew spent less time on the actual ocean than the film would have viewers believe. At a press conference after the film's screening at Cannes in 2013, Redford revealed that his ear was damaged during the production.

=== Music ===
The film score to All Is Lost is composed by Edward Sharpe and the Magnetic Zeros' frontman Alex Ebert, who signed on to the film in November 2012. Speaking of the experience of working on the film, Ebert said, "This project was a dream—an open space to play in but also space to listen to the elements—wind, water, rain, sun, are the story's other characters to me. I knew I had quite a task ahead of me: to at once allow the elements to sing and to give Redford a voice with which to, once in a while, respond." The "extra features" of the Blu-ray Disc explain the unique development of the sound track, music, script and other production considerations.

A soundtrack album featuring ten original compositions and one new song, all written, composed, and produced by Ebert, was released on 1 October 2013, by Community Music. On 12 September 2013, the song "Amen" from the soundtrack was made available for streaming.

== Release ==
All Is Lost screened Out of Competition at the 2013 Cannes Film Festival on 22 May. The film was distributed theatrically by Lionsgate and Roadside Attractions jointly in the United States. FilmNation Entertainment handled foreign sales. In February 2012, Universal Pictures acquired distribution rights to the film for 19 territories including the United Kingdom, Australia, France, Italy, Spain, Belgium, Netherlands, South Korea, Russia and Scandinavia. Other deals were made with HGC in China, Square One Entertainment in Germany, Sun Distribution in Latin America, Paris Filmes in Brazil, Audio Visual Entertainment in Greece and Pony Canyon in Japan. It began a limited release in the United States on 18 October 2013.

== Reception ==
Film review aggregator Rotten Tomatoes reports that 95% of critics gave the film a positive review based on 239 reviews; the average rating is 8.00/10. The site's consensus states: "Anchored by another tremendous performance in a career full of them, All Is Lost offers a moving, eminently worthwhile testament to Robert Redford's ability to hold the screen." On Metacritic the film has a score of 87 out of 100 based on 45 reviews, considered to be "universal acclaim".

After the screening of the film at the Cannes Film Festival, Redford received a standing ovation. Writing for The Independent, Geoffrey Macnab says the film was "utterly compelling viewing". Andrew Pulver, writing for The Guardian, says that "Redford delivers a tour de force performance: holding the screen effortlessly with no acting support whatsoever." Justin Chang of Variety says of Redford's performance that he "holds the viewer's attention merely by wincing, scowling, troubleshooting and yelling the occasional expletive". Robbie Collin of The Telegraph says, "The film's scope is limited, but as far as it goes, All Is Lost is very good indeed: a neat idea, very nimbly executed."

In The Guardian, Peter Bradshaw raves: "Redford's near-mute performance as a mysterious old man of the sea adrift and utterly alone makes for a bold, gripping thriller." Spotting a possible metaphor, he observes: "... the entire drama works well as a parable of old age… the news of impending mortality pouring in through the windows like seawater" and concludes: "What a strikingly bold and thoughtful film." Alan Scherstuhl of The Village Voice writes that the film is "a genuine nail-biter, scrupulously made and fully involving, elemental in its simplicity." David Morgan of CBS News gives the film a positive review, stating, "Four decades ago Redford demonstrated a similar capacity for survival skills as the mountain man Jeremiah Johnson. Today, at age 77, without a supporting cast and performing virtually all of his water stunts himself, Redford proves he is still up to the task, shining in what is an extremely physical but also an intellectually demanding role."

However, the film has been criticized in the sailing world for being unrealistic, in particular for the lack of certain safety equipment deemed standard for sailboats navigating the open ocean, such as an EPIRB, and other bad decisions made by the main character. An exception to this criticism is English Yachting Monthly, in which Dick Durham claims: "Certainly the film is authentic and grippingly realistic." Director Chandor himself, who says he went sailing with his parents when young and later a few times as an adult, stated in an interview with German sailing magazine Segeln that everything that happened in the film could have happened in reality. His only reservations were about the probability of crossing the Indian Ocean single-handed and the failure to evade the storm using modern technology and due attention.

=== Top ten lists ===
All Is Lost was listed on many critics' top ten lists.

- 2nd – Robert Horton, Seattle Weekly
- 3rd – Genevieve Koski, The Dissolve
- 3rd – Steve Davis, Austin Chronicle
- 3rd – Ty Burr, The Boston Globe
- 3rd – Mark Savlov, Austin Chronicle
- 5th – Ann Hornaday, The Washington Post
- 5th – Mark Mohan, The Oregonian
- 5th – Alonso Duralde, TheWrap
- 5th – Brian Miller, Seattle Weekly
- 6th – Stephen Schaefer, Boston Herald
- 6th – Rex Reed, The New York Observer
- 6th – Marjorie Baumgarten, Austin Chronicle
- 6th – Mike D'Angelo, The A.V. Club
- 6th – Noel Murray, The Dissolve
- 6th – Barbara Vancheri, Pittsburgh Post-Gazette
- 6th – Joshua Rothkopf, Time Out New York
- 6th – A. O. Scott, The New York Times
- 7th – David Edelstein, Vulture
- 7th – Scott Feinberg, The Hollywood Reporter
- 7th – Keith Phipps, The Dissolve
- 7th – Sasha Stone, Awards Daily
- 7th – Christopher Orr, The Atlantic
- 7th – Kristopher Tapley, HitFix
- 8th – Richard Roeper, Chicago Sun-Times
- 9th – Lisa Schwarzbaum, BBC
- 9th – Chris Nashawaty, Entertainment Weekly
- 9th – Elizabeth Weitzman, New York Daily News
- Top 10 (listed alphabetically, not ranked) – David Denby, The New Yorker
- Top 10 (listed alphabetically, not ranked) – James Verniere, Boston Herald
- Top 10 (listed alphabetically, not ranked) – Claudia Puig, USA Today
- Top 10 (listed alphabetically, not ranked) – Stephen Whitty, The Star-Ledger
- Top 10 (listed alphabetically, not ranked) – Steven Rea, The Philadelphia Inquirer

== Accolades ==
Awards
Award	Category	Recipients and nominees	Result
AARP Annual Movies for Grownups Awards	Judge's Award for Extraordinary Merit	All is Lost	Won
86th Academy Awards	Best Sound Editing	Steve Boeddeker, Richard Hymns	Nominated
Chicago Film Critics Association	Best Actor	Robert Redford	Nominated
Critics' Choice Movie Awards	Best Actor	Robert Redford	Nominated
Detroit Film Critics Society	Best Actor	Robert Redford	Nominated
2013 Deauville American Film Festival	Prix du Jury (Jury Special Prize)	J. C. Chandor	Won
71st Golden Globe Awards	Best Actor – Motion Picture Drama	Robert Redford	Nominated
71st Golden Globe Awards	Best Original Score	Alex Ebert	Won
Gotham Awards	Best Actor	Robert Redford	Nominated
Independent Spirit Awards	Best Feature	Neal Dodson, Anna Gerb, J. C. Chandor	Nominated
Independent Spirit Awards	Best Director	J. C. Chandor	Nominated
Independent Spirit Awards	Best Male Lead	Robert Redford	Nominated
Independent Spirit Awards	Best Cinematography	Frank G. DeMarco	Nominated
Motion Picture Sound Editors Golden Reel Awards	Best Sound Editing: Sound Effects & Foley in a Feature Film	Richard Hymns, Steve Boeddeker	Nominated
New York Film Critics Circle	Best Actor	Robert Redford	Won
Phoenix Film Critics Society	Best Actor in a Leading Role	Robert Redford	Nominated
San Francisco Film Critics Circle	Best Actor	Robert Redford	Nominated
San Francisco Film Critics Circle	Best Editing	Pete Beaudreau	Nominated
Satellite Awards	Best Motion Picture	Neal Dodson, Anna Gerb, J. C. Chandor	Nominated
Satellite Awards	Best Actor – Motion Picture	Robert Redford	Nominated
Satellite Awards	Best Sound (Editing and Mixing)	Brandon Proctor, Richard Hymns, Steve Boeddeker	Nominated
Satellite Awards	Best Visual Effects	Brendon O'Dell, Collin Davies, Robert Munroe	Nominated
Washington D.C. Area Film Critics Association	Best Actor	Robert Redford	Nominated

== See also ==
- Survival film, an article about the film genre, with a list of related films
- The Old Man and the Sea
