= Margin Call =

2011 American film by J. C. Chandor

- Theatrical release poster
- Directed by: J. C. Chandor
- Written by: J. C. Chandor
- Produced by: Joe Jenckes; Robert Ogden Barnum; Corey Moosa; Michael Benaroya; Neal Dodson; Zachary Quinto
- Starring: Kevin Spacey; Paul Bettany; Jeremy Irons; Zachary Quinto; Penn Badgley; Simon Baker; Mary McDonnell; Demi Moore; Stanley Tucci
- Cinematography: Frank DeMarco
- Edited by: Pete Beaudreau
- Music by: Nathan Larson
- Production companies: Myriad Pictures; Benaroya Pictures; Before the Door Pictures; Washington Square Films; Untitled Entertainment; Sakonnet Capital Partners
- Distributed by: Lionsgate; Roadside Attractions
- Release dates: January 25, 2011 (Sundance); October 21, 2011 (United States)
- Running time: 107 minutes
- Country: United States
- Language: English
- Budget: $3.5 million
- Box office: $19.5 million

Margin Call is a 2011 American drama film written and directed by J. C. Chandor in his directorial debut. The story takes place over 24 hours at a large Wall Street investment bank during the initial stages of the 2008 financial crisis. It focuses on the actions taken by a group of employees during the crisis. The title is a reference to a "margin call", the situation where a financial market participant must provide additional collateral for an existing financial market contract due to increased credit risk. The film stars an ensemble cast consisting of Kevin Spacey, Paul Bettany, Jeremy Irons, Zachary Quinto, Penn Badgley, Simon Baker, Mary McDonnell, Demi Moore, and Stanley Tucci.

The film was produced by Myriad Pictures, Benaroya Pictures, and Before the Door Pictures. It was produced in association with WSF. Theatrically, it was distributed by Lionsgate and Roadside Attractions in North America, with Myriad handling international distribution through independent distributors. The director and screenwriter, J. C. Chandor, is the son of an investment banker; the screenplay was partly inspired by Chandor's own foray into real estate investments in NYC shortly before the financial crisis. The score was composed by Nathan Larson.

The film premiered at Sundance on January 25, 2011, and opened in theaters nationwide in the U.S. on October 21, 2011. It received positive critical reviews and was nominated for several awards for its screenplay and direction, including the Academy Award for Best Original Screenplay. It won best first film at the New York Film Critics Circle Awards and best original screenplay at the San Francisco Film Critics Circle Awards in 2011. It grossed $2.5 million in domestic ticket sales after expanding to 178 theaters and had a day-and-date release with VOD sales that, based on early indicators, were comparable to theatrical ticket sales. The film was released on DVD and Blu-ray in the U.S. on December 20, 2011.

== Plot ==
In 2008, an investment bank begins laying off a large number of employees, among them Eric Dale, the head of risk management. Dale's attempts to speak about the implications of a model he is working on are ignored. On his way out, he gives Peter Sullivan, an analyst in his department, a flash drive containing his work, warning him to "be careful". Sullivan, intrigued, works after hours to complete Dale's model.

Sullivan discovers that the assumptions underpinning the firm's risk profile are wrong; historical volatility levels in mortgage-backed securities are being exceeded, so the firm's position in those assets is over-leveraged and the debt incurred from those over-leveraged assets could bankrupt the company. Sullivan calls his colleague, junior analyst Seth Bregman, to return to work with the head of credit trading, Will Emerson. Emerson, in turn, summons Sam Rogers, his boss, after reviewing Sullivan's findings. They are unable to contact Dale because his company phone has been disabled. Sullivan and Bregman go out to find Dale, while Rogers and Emerson inform the company's senior management of the situation.

A meeting of division head Jared Cohen, chief risk management officer Sarah Robertson, and other senior executives concludes that Sullivan's findings are accurate, and CEO John Tuld is called. Upon Tuld's arrival, and after Sullivan explains the problem, Rogers, Cohen, and Tuld spar regarding a course of action: Cohen's plan, favored by Tuld, is a fire sale of the problematic assets. Rogers disagrees, pointing out that the sale will damage the firm's relationships and reputation within the industry and cause major instability in the markets. Tuld stresses that his desire to avoid the firm's bankruptcy is worth that cost.

After the meeting with Tuld, Emerson learns from Dale's wife that he has returned home. Emerson travels to Dale's residence with Bregman and attempts to persuade him to return to the firm, but he refuses. During the drive back, Bregman asks whether he will lose his job; Emerson responds that he likely will, but, philosophizing about the nature of financial markets, tells him not to lose faith and that his work is necessary.

Tuld tells Robertson that he will assign the blame to her in front of the traders and the board of directors; Robertson argues that she warned both him and Cohen about the situation over a year ago and that both had acknowledged the risks, but she fails to change Tuld's mind. Meanwhile, Dale is pressed into cooperating with Cohen's plan, with the firm threatening to cut his benefits and severance if he refuses and promising a $1.5 million if he does by just sitting in a closed room together with Robertson. Cohen commiserates with Robertson.

Despite his misgivings, Rogers rallies his traders and informs them of the fire sale. He acknowledges the damage likely to be done to their reputations and careers but tells them that they will receive seven-figure bonuses if most of the traders' assigned assets are sold by day's end. As trading progresses, the firm elicits suspicion and, eventually, anger from its counterparties; it incurs heavy losses, but manages to sell off most of the bad assets.

Another round of layoffs begins; upon learning he was spared, Rogers confronts Tuld and submits his resignation. Tuld dismisses Rogers' view of the situation by recalling past economic crises, arguing that such events always happen and that Rogers should not feel guilty for acting in his and the firm's interests. He asks Rogers to stay on for two more years, and Rogers reluctantly accepts, citing his personal financial need. Tuld also informs Rogers that Sullivan will be promoted.

Finally, Rogers buries his euthanized dog in his ex-wife's front yard during the night.

== Cast ==
- Kevin Spacey as Sam Rogers
- Paul Bettany as Will Emerson
- Jeremy Irons as John Tuld
- Zachary Quinto as Peter Sullivan
- Penn Badgley as Seth Bregman
- Simon Baker as Jared Cohen
- Mary McDonnell as Mary Rogers, Sam’s ex-wife
- Demi Moore as Sarah Robertson
- Stanley Tucci as Eric Dale
- Aasif Mandvi as Ramesh Shah
- Ashley Williams as Heather Burke, an HR employee
- Susan Blackwell as Lauren Bratberg, an HR employee
- Maria Dizzia as Tuld's executive assistant

== Production ==
=== Development ===
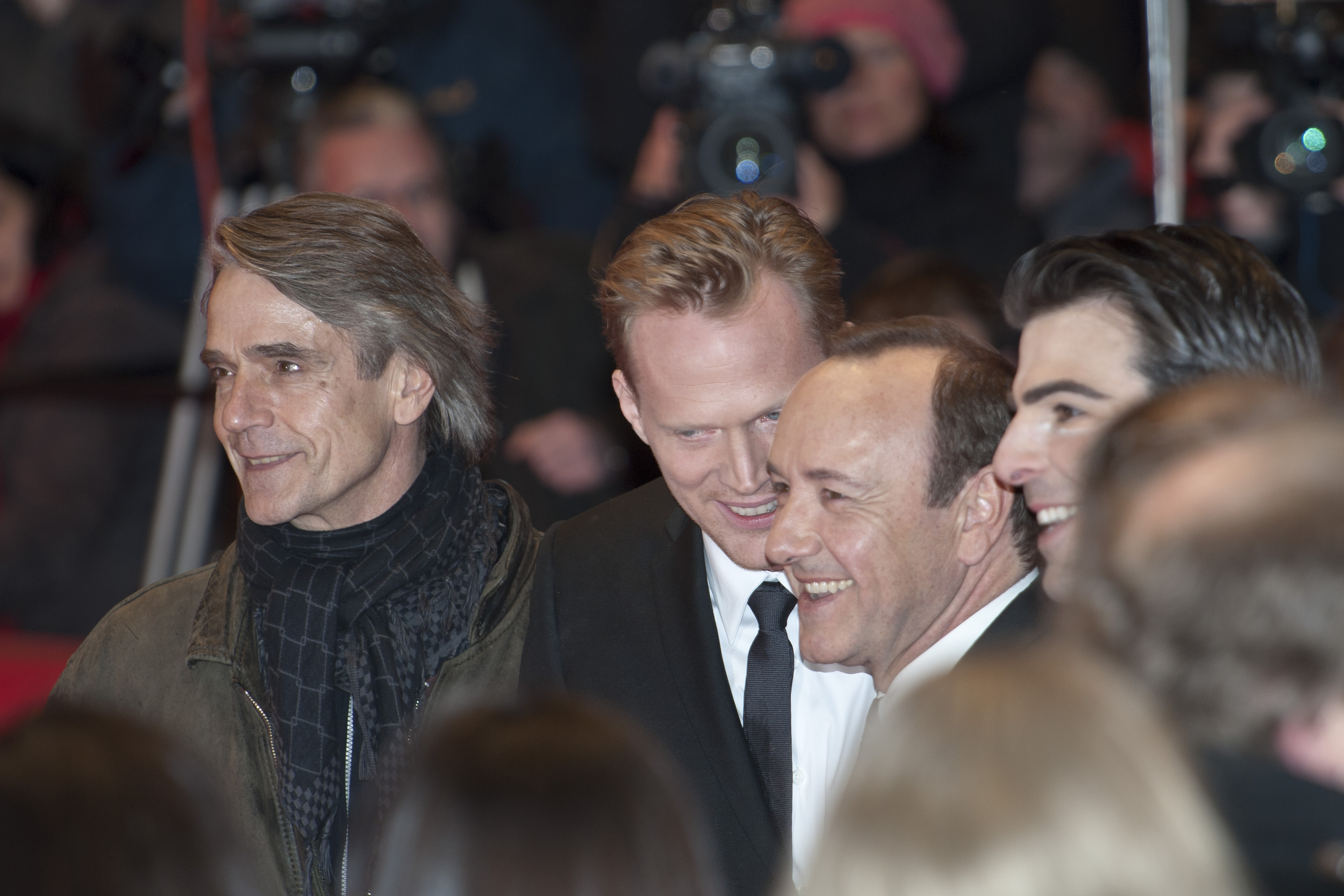
Cast of Margin Call at the Berlin Film Festival 2011 (left to right: Jeremy Irons, Paul Bettany, Kevin Spacey and Zachary Quinto

Chandor wrote the screenplay in a borrowed office at WSF on the Bowery, which he described as "a home for homeless filmmakers". While his family lived in Providence, he slept on the couch until production budget allowed him to rent a nearby apartment. He kept pictures of the actors on the wall to track eyelines for the multi-character conference room scenes.

=== Filming ===
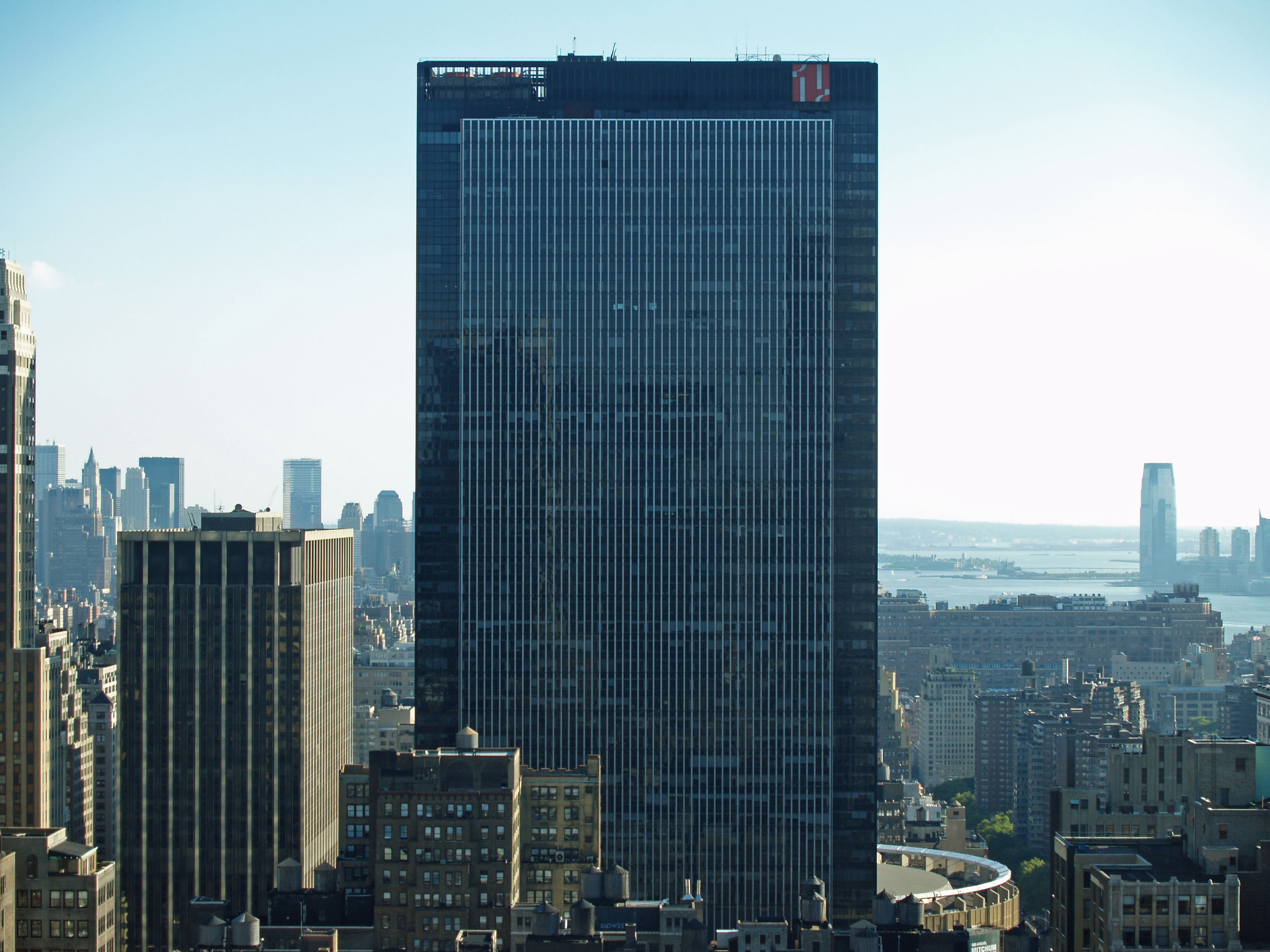
Over 80% of the film's action was shot at Penn 1 in summer 2010. (Picture by David Shankbone in August 2007)

Myriad Pictures first introduced the project at the Cannes Film Market in May 2010. Principal photography began on June 21, 2010, in NYC and was shot in 17 days. More than 80% of the action was shot on the 42nd floor of Penn 1, which had recently been vacated by a trading firm. Jeremy Irons joined the cast during the third week of filming to play the firm's chief executive.

At the American Film Market in November 2010, Myriad president Kirk D'Amico showed footage to international buyers for the first time, closing deals in Germany, China, Canada, Australia, Italy, Russia, Scandinavia, Mexico, Brazil, and Argentina.

The film premiered at the 2011 Sundance Film Festival in Park City. Following the screening, multiple distributors competed to acquire the film. After all-night negotiations, Lionsgate partnered with Roadside Attractions to acquire North American distribution rights. IFC Films was reportedly among the top bidders, offering a seven-figure sum. Myriad Pictures retained international distribution rights.

The film also played in Competition at the 61st Berlin International Film Festival and was nominated for the Golden Bear. The film was produced by Zachary Quinto's production company, Before the Door Pictures, with Quinto and his two producing partners and Carnegie Mellon University classmates, Neal Dodson and Corey Moosa.

=== Inspirations ===
The film does not depict any real Wall Street firm, and the fictional firm is unnamed, but the plot has similarities to some events during the 2008 financial crisis: Goldman Sachs similarly moved early to hedge and reduce its position in mortgage-backed securities, at the urging of two employees, which essentially mirrors Tuld's comment about the advantage of moving first. Lehman Brothers moved second and went bankrupt. John Tuld's name is said to be a combination of Merrill Lynch's ex-CEO John Thain and Lehman Brothers' ex-CEO Richard Fuld. Director J. C. Chandor wrote the film in the days after Lehman Brothers failed.

== Reception ==
=== Box office ===
Margin Call grossed $5.4 million domestically (United States and Canada), and $14.2 million in other territories, for a worldwide total of $19.5 million, against a budget of $3.5 million.

=== Critical reception ===
On the review aggregator website Rotten Tomatoes, 87% of 170 critics' reviews are positive, with an average rating of 7.2/10. The website's consensus reads: "Smart, tightly wound, and solidly acted, Margin Call turns the convoluted financial meltdown of '08 into gripping, thought-provoking drama." Metacritic, which uses a weighted average, assigned the film a score of 76 out of 100, based on 38 critics, indicating "generally favorable" reviews.

The New Yorker film critic David Denby said it was "easily the best Wall Street movie ever made". Philip French of The Guardian called it the "best fictional treatment" of the 2008 financial crisis. Justin Chang of Variety described it as "a methodical, coolly absorbing boardroom thriller". Jake Bernstein of ProPublica said that Chandor "used the financial crisis as a springboard to create the most insightful Wall Street movie ever filmed". Roger Ebert of the Chicago Sun-Times gave the film three and half stars out of four, noting that it "employs an excellent cast who can make financial talk into compelling dialogue." In 2022, Bloomberg News financial columnist Matt Levine described Margin Call as "the best finance movie". Film critic Bill Wine rated it 3 out of 4 stars, noting in a review for CBS: "Chandor takes a gamble with a screenplay that some might see as repetitive, but works nicely to make dense material clear and understandable." Chris Knight of the National Post described it as "clearly a cautionary tale" but "also a crackling good thriller." Dylan Matthews of Vox wrote in 2022: "To a large degree, my love for Margin Call boils down to it being the one film that, more than any other, seems to understand the modern workplace (or at least the office workplace), and the moral compromises involved in living and thriving in that world."

A. O. Scott of The New York Times wrote: "It is hard to believe that Margin Call is Mr. Chandor's first feature. His formal command – his ability to imply far more than he shows or says and to orchestrate a large, complex drama out of whispers, glances, and snippets of jargon – is downright awe inspiring." He continued: "Margin Call is a thriller, moving through ambient shadows to the anxious tempo of Nathan Larson's hushed, anxious score. It is also a horror movie, with disaster lurking like an unseen demon outside the skyscraper windows and behind the computer screens. It is also a workplace comedy of sorts. The crackling, syncopated dialogue and the plot, full of reversals and double crosses, owe an obvious debt to David Mamet's profane fables of deal-making machismo. Hovering over all of it is the dark romance of capital: the elegance of numbers; the kinkiness of money; the deep, rotten, erotic allure of power." Michael M. Grynbaum of The New York Times described it as "one of the quietest films about Wall Street ever made."

Mike Russell of The Oregonian rated it C+, noting that Chandor downplayed "everything to the point of mild sleepiness" and wrote "far too many variations of that Hollywood device where a character asks for a spreadsheet or highly technical financial concept to be explained to them 'in plain English, please.'"

Stephen Farber of The Hollywood Reporter wrote: "Technical credits are top-notch. Frank DeMarco's sleek cinematography of the Manhattan skyline effectively immerses us in the soulless but inviting universe where these financial dramas played out. Sadly, the script doesn't burrow as rewardingly beneath the glittering surfaces."

=== Accolades ===
Awards group	Category	Recipient	Result
Academy Awards	Best Original Screenplay	J. C. Chandor	Nominated
Australian Academy of Cinema and Television Arts	Best Film – International	J. C. Chandor, Neal Dodson, Zachary Quinto	Nominated
Australian Academy of Cinema and Television Arts	Best Direction – International	J. C. Chandor	Nominated
Australian Academy of Cinema and Television Arts	Best Screenplay – International	J. C. Chandor	Won
Casting Society of America	Outstanding Achievement in Casting for a Studio or Independent Drama Feature	Bernard Telsey, Tiffany Little Canfield	Nominated
Detroit Film Critics Society	Best Ensemble		Nominated
Independent Spirit Awards	Best First Feature	J. C. Chandor, Neal Dodson, Zachary Quinto	Won
Independent Spirit Awards	Best First Screenplay	J. C. Chandor	Nominated
Independent Spirit Awards	Robert Altman Award	J. C. Chandor, Tiffany Little Canfield, Bernie Telsey, Penn Badgley, Simon Baker, Paul Bettany, Jeremy Irons, Mary McDonnell, Demi Moore, Zachary Quinto, Kevin Spacey and Stanley Tucci	Won
National Board of Review Awards	Spotlight Award for Best Directorial Debut	J. C. Chandor	Won
National Board of Review Awards	Top Ten Independent Films		Nominated
San Francisco Film Critics Circle Awards	Best Original Screenplay	J. C. Chandor	Won
New York Film Critics Circle Awards	Best First Film	J. C. Chandor	Won

== See also ==
- Great Recession

=== Other films ===
- Wall Street (1987)
- Wall Street: Money Never Sleeps (2010)
- Inside Job (2010)
- Too Big to Fail (2011)
- The Wolf of Wall Street (2013)
- 99 Homes (2014)
- The Big Short (2015)
- The Hummingbird Project (2018)
