= List of roles and awards of Oscar Isaac =

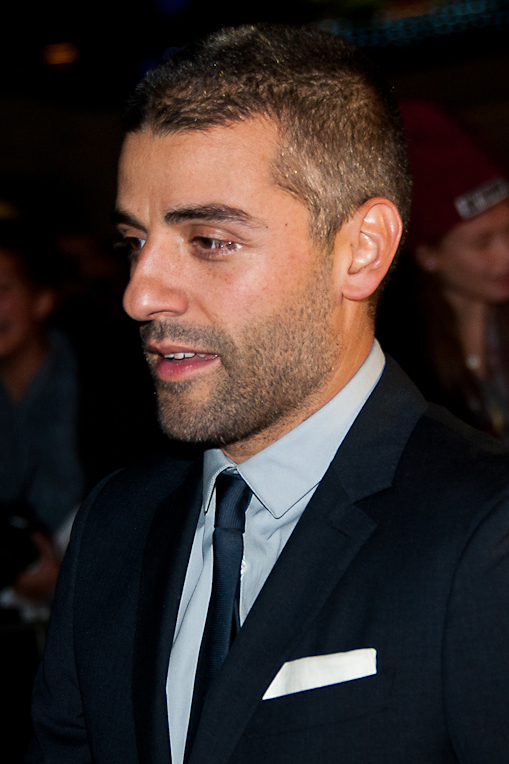
Isaac in 2013

American actor Oscar Isaac has received several accolades for his work, including one Golden Globe Award, National Board of Review Award and Australian Film Institute Award each. His career began as a teenager with a minor role in the film Illtown (1998), followed by stage roles in Joseph Adler's 2000 productions of This Is Our Youth and Side Man in Miami, Florida. Isaac landed his first major role in the biblical drama film The Nativity Story (2006). He played Romeo alongside Lauren Ambrose in the Public Theater's Romeo and Juliet (2007). For much of the rest of the 2000s, Isaac played minor roles in films—the thriller The Life Before Her Eyes (2007), the biopic Che (2008), the spy thriller Body of Lies (2008) and the Spanish historical drama Agora (2009). He won the AACTA Award for Best Actor in a Supporting Role for his role as José Ramos-Horta in Balibo (2009). In 2010, Isaac played villain King John in Robin Hood. His profile increased with four roles in 2011. These included an asylum orderly in the fantasy Sucker Punch and an ex-convict in the critically acclaimed action drama Drive (2011). He had four film releases in 2012, including For Greater Glory, for which he was nominated for an ALMA Award for Favorite Movie Actor – Supporting Role.

In 2013, Isaac had his breakthrough playing the eponymous role of a struggling folk singer in the musical drama Inside Llewyn Davis, which resulted in several film offers. For the film, he was nominated for the Golden Globe Award for Best Actor – Motion Picture Musical or Comedy. He followed this by playing an ambitious man struggling to keep his business intact in a violent city in the crime drama A Most Violent Year (2014), where he contributed to the creation of his character's background. For his performance in the film, Isaac won a National Board of Review Award for Best Actor. In 2015, he portrayed the reclusive inventor of a gynoid in the science fiction film Ex Machina, and played his first leading role on television—the miniseries Show Me a Hero. His role in the latter garnered him a Golden Globe Award for Best Actor – Miniseries or Television Film. Isaac became a superstar after playing Poe Dameron in the Star Wars sequel trilogy (2015–2019) and Star Wars Resistance (2018–2020). He took on the role of the titular villain in the commercially successful superhero film X-Men: Apocalypse (2016).

In 2017, Isaac possibly became the first Latino actor to play Hamlet in a major US production after he was cast in the Public Theater's Hamlet. Isaac's work in 2018 included roles in the science fiction film Annihilation and the historical drama Operation Finale, the latter of which he also produced. He then reunited with A Most Violent Year director J. C. Chandor in the action adventure film Triple Frontier (2019). Two years later, he starred in the science fiction film Dune, the drama The Card Counter and the HBO miniseries Scenes from a Marriage. The lattermost garnered him a nomination for a Golden Globe Award for Best Actor – Miniseries or Television Film. In 2022, Isaac joined the Marvel Cinematic Universe by playing the titular superheroes in the miniseries Moon Knight, for which he was nominated for a MTV Movie Award for Best Hero; he also served as an executive producer for the series.

== Filmography ==
=== Film ===
Oscar Isaac's film credits
Year	Title	Role	Notes	Ref.
1998	Illtown	Pool Boy		
2002	All About the Benjamins	Frank		
2004	Lenny the Wonder Dog	Detective Fartman		
2006	Pu-239	Shiv		
2006	The Nativity Story	Saint Joseph		
2007	The Life Before Her Eyes	Marcus		
2008	Che	Interpreter/Narrator		
2008	Body of Lies	Bassam		
2009	Agora	Orestes		
2009	Balibo	José Ramos-Horta		
2010	Robin Hood	John, King of England		
2011	Sucker Punch	Blue Jones		
2011	W.E.	Evgeni		
2011	10 Years	Reeves		
2011	Drive	Standard Gabriel		
2012	For Greater Glory	Victoriano "El Catorce" Ramírez		
2012	Revenge for Jolly!	Cecil		
2012	The Bourne Legacy	Outcome No. 3		
2012	Won't Back Down	Michael Perry		
2013	Inside Llewyn Davis	Llewyn Davis		
2013	In Secret	Laurent LeClaire		
2014	The Two Faces of January	Rydal Keener		
2014	Ticky Tacky	Lucien	Short film	
2014	A Most Violent Year	Abel Morales		
2015	Ex Machina	Nathan Bateman		
2015	Mojave	John "Jack" Jackson		
2015	Star Wars: The Force Awakens	Poe Dameron		
2016	X-Men: Apocalypse	En Sabah Nur / Apocalypse		
2016	The Promise	Mikael Boghosian		
2017	Lightningface	Basil Stitt	Short film; also executive producer	
2017	Suburbicon	Bud Cooper		
2017	Star Wars: The Last Jedi	Poe Dameron		
2018	Annihilation	Kane		
2018	Operation Finale	Peter Malkin	Also producer	
2018	At Eternity's Gate	Paul Gauguin		
2018	Life Itself	Will Dempsey		
2018	Spider-Man: Into the Spider-Verse	Miguel O'Hara / Spider-Man 2099	Cameo; voice role	
2019	Triple Frontier	Santiago "Pope" Garcia		
2019	The Addams Family	Gomez Addams	Voice role	
2019	Star Wars: The Rise of Skywalker	Poe Dameron		
2020	The Letter Room	Richard	Short film; also executive producer	
2021	The Card Counter	William Tell		
2021	The Addams Family 2	Gomez Addams	Voice role	
2021	Dune	Duke Leto Atreides		
2022	Big Gold Brick	Anselm Vogelweide	Also executive producer	
2023	Spider-Man: Across the Spider-Verse	Miguel O'Hara / Spider-Man 2099	Voice role	
2024	Legend of Destruction	Ben Baitch	English dub; voice role	
2025	The King of Kings	Jesus Christ	Voice role	
2025	King Hamlet	Himself	Documentary; also executive producer	
2025	Frankenstein	Dr. Victor Frankenstein		
2025	In the Hand of Dante	Dante Alighieri / Nick Tosches	Also executive producer	
2027	Spider-Man: Beyond the Spider-Verse †	Miguel O'Hara / Spider-Man 2099	Voice; In production	

Key
†	Denotes films that have not yet been released

=== Television ===
Oscar Isaac's television credits
Year	Title	Role	Notes	Ref.
2006	Law & Order: Criminal Intent	Robbie Paulson	Episode: "The Healer"	
2015	Show Me a Hero	Nick Wasicsko	6 episodes	
2018–2019	Star Wars Resistance	Poe Dameron	Voice role; 4 episodes	
2021	Scenes from a Marriage	Jonathan Levy	5 episodes; also executive producer	
2022	Saturday Night Live	Himself (host)	Episode: "Oscar Isaac/Charli XCX"	
2022	Moon Knight	Marc Spector / Moon Knight	Lead role; also executive producer	
2022	Moon Knight	Steven Grant / Mr. Knight	Lead role; also executive producer	
2022	Moon Knight	Jake Lockley	Lead role; also executive producer	
2022	The Last Movie Stars	Sydney Pollack	Voice role; documentary series	
2024	What If...?	Marc Spector / Moon Knight	Voice role; episode: "What If... the Hulk Fought the Mech Avengers?"	
2026	Beef	Joshua "Josh" Martín	Main role; season 2; also executive producer	

=== Music videos ===
Oscar Isaac's music video credits
Year	Title	Artist(s)	Director(s)	Notes	Ref(s)
2026	"Here"	Mumford & Sons with Chris Stapleton	Bradley J. Calder		

=== Video games ===
Oscar Isaac's video game credits
Year	Title	Role	Notes	Ref(s)
2015	Disney Infinity 3.0	Poe Dameron		
2016	Lego Star Wars: The Force Awakens	Poe Dameron		
2025	Fortnite	Poe Dameron	Likeness	

=== Podcasts ===
Oscar Isaac's podcast credits
Year	Title	Role	Notes	Ref(s)
2015	Homecoming	Walter Cruz		
2022	Case 63	Case 63/Peter Roiter		

== Stage ==
Oscar Isaac's theatre credits
Year	Title	Role	Venue	Ref.
2005	The Two Gentlemen of Verona	Proteus	Delacorte Theater, Off-Broadway	
2006	Beauty of the Father	Federico García Lorca	New York City Center, Off-Broadway	
2007	Romeo and Juliet	Romeo	Delacorte Theater, Off-Broadway	
2008	Grace	Tom	Lucille Lortel Theatre, Off-Broadway	
2011	A Doll’s House	Nils Krogstad	Williamstown Theatre Festival	
2011	We Live Here	Daniel	New York City Center, Off-Broadway	
2017	Hamlet	Prince Hamlet	The Public Theater, Off-Broadway	
2023	The Sign in Sidney Brustein's Window	Sidney Brustein	Brooklyn Academy of Music	
2023	The Sign in Sidney Brustein's Window	Sidney Brustein	James Earl Jones Theatre, Broadway	

== Awards and nominations ==
Awards and nominations received by Oscar Isaac
Award	Year (Note: Indicates the year of ceremony)	Category	Nominated work	Result	Ref(s)
Alliance of Women Film Journalists Awards	2013	Best Actor	Inside Llewyn Davis	Nominated	
ALMA Awards	2012	Favorite Movie Actor – Supporting Role	For Greater Glory	Nominated	
Austin Film Critics Association Awards	2015	Best Supporting Actor	Ex Machina	Nominated	
Australian Film Institute Awards	2009	Best Actor in a Supporting Role	Balibo	Won	
Celebration of Cinema and Television	2025	Actor – Film	Frankenstein	Won	
Chicago Film Critics Association Awards	2013	Best Actor	Inside Llewyn Davis	Nominated	
Critics' Choice Awards	2016	Best Actor in a Movie/Miniseries	Show Me a Hero	Nominated	
Critics' Choice Super Awards	2023	Best Actor in a Superhero Series	Moon Knight	Nominated	
Detroit Film Critics Society Awards	2015	Best Supporting Actor	Ex Machina	Nominated	
Detroit Film Critics Society Awards	2021	Best Actor	The Card Counter	Nominated	
Dublin Film Critics' Circle Awards	2021	Best Actor	The Card Counter	3rd place	
Dublin Film Critics' Circle Awards	2015	Best Actor	A Most Violent Year	2nd place	
Empire Awards	2014	Best Male Newcomer	Inside Llewyn Davis	Nominated	
Florida Film Critics Circle Awards	2015	Best Supporting Actor	Ex Machina	Won	
Florida Film Critics Circle Awards	2021	Best Actor	The Card Counter	Nominated	
Georgia Film Critics Association Awards	2014	Best Actor	Inside Llewyn Davis	Nominated	
Golden Globe Awards	2014	Best Actor – Motion Picture Musical or Comedy	Inside Llewyn Davis	Nominated	
Golden Globe Awards	2016	Best Actor – Miniseries or Television Film	Show Me a Hero	Won	
Golden Globe Awards	2022	Best Actor – Miniseries or Television Film	Scenes from a Marriage	Nominated	
Golden Globe Awards	2026	Best Actor in a Motion Picture – Drama	Frankenstein	Nominated	
Gotham Awards	2013	Best Actor	Inside Llewyn Davis	Nominated	
Gotham Awards	2014	Best Actor	A Most Violent Year	Nominated	
Gotham Awards	2021	Outstanding Lead Performance	The Card Counter	Nominated	
Gotham Awards	2025	Vanguard Tribute	Frankenstein	Honored	
Hollywood Critics Association TV Awards	2022	Best Actor in a Streaming Limited or Anthology Series or Movie	Moon Knight	Nominated	
Hollywood Critics Association TV Awards	2022	Best Actor in a Broadcast Network or Cable Limited Series, Anthology Series, or TV Movie	Scenes from a Marriage	Won	
Independent Spirit Awards	2014	Best Lead Male	Inside Llewyn Davis	Nominated	
International Cinephile Society Awards	2014	Best Actor	Inside Llewyn Davis	Won (Note: Tied with Leonardo DiCaprio for The Wolf of Wall Street (2013))	
International Cinephile Society Awards	2014	Best Ensemble	Inside Llewyn Davis	Won	
London Film Critics' Circle Awards	2016	Best Supporting Actor of the Year	Ex Machina	Nominated	
London Film Critics' Circle Awards	2022	Actor of the Year	The Card Counter	Nominated	
MTV Movie & TV Awards	2022	Best Hero	Moon Knight	Nominated	
National Society of Film Critics Awards	2014	Best Actor	Inside Llewyn Davis	Won	
National Board of Review Awards	2014	Best Actor	A Most Violent Year	Won (Note: Tied with Michael Keaton for Birdman (2014))	
Online Film Critics Society Awards	2013	Best Actor	Inside Llewyn Davis	Nominated	
Online Film Critics Society Awards	2015	Best Supporting Actor	Ex Machina	Won	
Online Film Critics Society Awards	2022	Best Actor	The Card Counter	Nominated	
People's Choice Awards	2022	Male TV Star of 2022	Moon Knight	Nominated	
Phoenix Critics Circle	2025	Best Actor in a Leading Role	Frankenstein	Nominated	
Premios Juventud	2022	Favorite Actor	Moon Knight	Nominated	
Primetime Emmy Awards	2022	Outstanding Lead Actor in a Limited or Anthology Series or Movie	Scenes from a Marriage	Nominated	
Primetime Emmy Awards	2026	Outstanding Lead Actor in a Limited or Anthology Series or Movie	Beef	Nominated	
Primetime Emmy Awards	2026	Outstanding Limited or Anthology Series	Beef	Nominated	
San Diego Film Critics Society Awards	2013	Best Actor	Inside Llewyn Davis	Won	
San Diego Film Critics Society Awards	2015	Best Supporting Actor	Ex Machina	Nominated	
San Diego Film Critics Society Awards	2017	Best Supporting Actor	Suburbicon	Nominated	
Satellite Awards	2016	Best Actor – Miniseries or Television Film	Show Me a Hero	Nominated	
Satellite Awards	2026	Best Actor in a Motion Picture – Drama	Frankenstein	Nominated	
Saturn Awards	2014	Best Actor	Inside Llewyn Davis	Nominated	
Saturn Awards	2022	Best Actor in a Streaming Series	Moon Knight	Won	
Savannah Film Festival	2025	Icon Award	Frankenstein	Won	
Screen Actors Guild Awards	2022	Outstanding Performance by a Male Actor in a Miniseries or Television Movie	Scenes from a Marriage	Nominated	
Screen Actors Guild Awards	2026	Outstanding Performance by a Cast in a Motion Picture	Frankenstein	Nominated	
Teen Choice Awards	2018	Choice Movie Actor – Sci-Fi/Fantasy	Star Wars: The Last Jedi	Nominated	
Toronto Film Critics Association Awards	2014	Best Actor	Inside Llewyn Davis	Won	
UK Film Festival	2021	Best Actor	The Letter Room	Won	
Vancouver Film Critics Circle Awards	2014	Best Actor	Inside Llewyn Davis	Won	
Washington D.C. Area Film Critics Association Awards	2014	Best Actor	Inside Llewyn Davis	Nominated	

== Sources ==
- Berg, Charles Ramírez (2018). "Oscar Isaac in A Most Violent Year". In Pomerance, Murray; Stevens, Kyle (eds.). Close-up: Great Cinematic Performances. Volume 1, American. Edinburgh University Press. pp. 291–301. ISBN 978-1-474417-01-3.
- Crelin, Joy (June 2016). "Oscar Isaac". Current Biography. Vol. 77, no. 6. pp. 47–51. ISSN 0011-3344.
- Román, David (2018). "Hamlet by William Shakespeare, and: Hamlet by William Shakespeare". Theatre Journal. 70 (4): 563–568. doi:10.1353/tj.2018.0113. S2CID 192052925.
