= Elvira Lind =

Danish film director

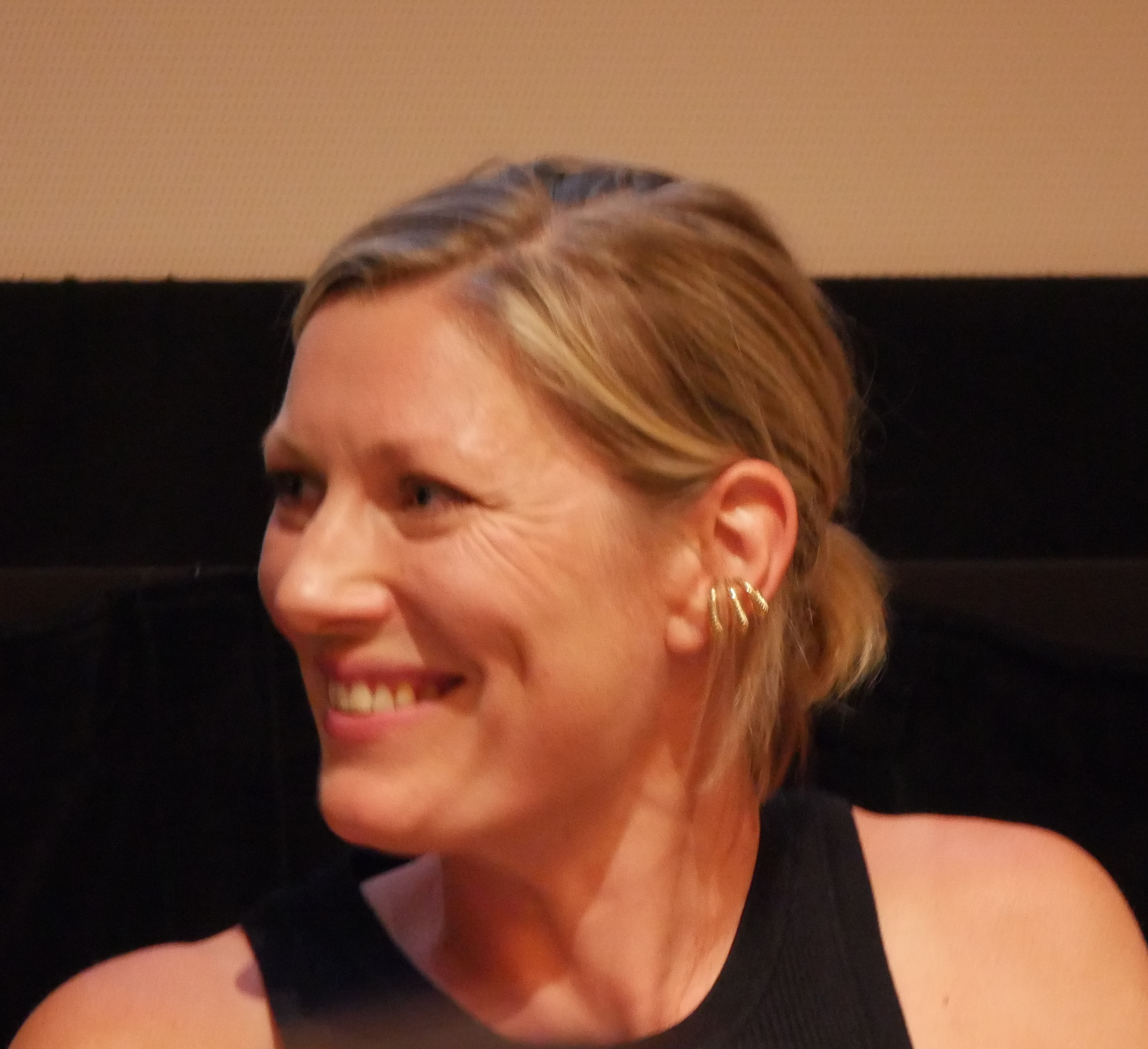
- Lind at the Telluride Film Festival, 2025
- Born: Nana Elvira Lind; 28 October 1981 (age 45); Copenhagen, Denmark
- Education: Documentary film; CityVarsity School of Media and Creative Arts; 2006
- Occupations: Film director; Writer; Producer
- Years active: 2014–present
- Notable work: The Letter Room
- Spouse: Oscar Isaac (m. 2017)
- Children: 2
- Relatives: Nicole Hernandez Hammer (sister-in-law)
- Website: elviralind.net

Elvira Lind (born 28 October 1981) is a Danish film director, writer and producer based in New York City.

== Early life and education ==
Nana Elvira Lind was born on 28 October 1981 in Copenhagen. Lind was educated at Det frie Gymnasium, and was part of the Gymnasium theater group. Lind studied documentary film at CityVarsity School of Media and Creative Arts. Graduating in 2006, Lind's final year film PASSION FOR PAWS won the best final year film award.

== Career ==
In 2014, Lind's first documentary feature Songs for Alexis premiered at the Toronto Hot Docs Canadian International Documentary Festival and was awarded the Reel Talent Award at the Copenhagen International Documentary Festival. In 2017, Lind's second documentary feature Bobbi Jene. premiered at the Tribeca Film Festival.

In 2019, Lind co-founded the multimedia production company "Mad Gene Media" alongside her husband Oscar Isaac.

In November 2020, Lind's first fiction short film The Letter Room premiered at the HollyShorts Film Festival, and was nominated for Best Live Action Short Film at the 93rd Academy Awards. In August 2025, Lind's documentary King Hamlet premiered at the 52nd Telluride Film Festival.

== Personal life ==
In 2017, Lind married American actor Oscar Isaac.

== Filmography ==
Year	Title	Type	Director	Writer	Producer	Cinematographer	Ref(s)
2014	Songs for Alexis	Documentary	Yes	Yes	No	Yes	
2014	Trentemøller: Gravity	Video short	Yes	Yes	No	No	
2017	Twiz & Tuck	TV series (6 episodes)	Yes	No	Yes	No	
2017	Twiz & Tuck's Bucket List	TV miniseries (10 episodes)	Yes	No	No	No	
2017	Bobbi Jene	Documentary	Yes	No	No	Yes	
2020	The Letter Room	Short film	Yes	Yes	Yes	No	
2025	King Hamlet	Documentary	Yes		Yes	Yes	
TBA	Stowaway †	TV series	No	No	Yes	No	

Key
†	Denotes films that have not yet been released

== Awards and nominations ==
Award	Year	Category	Nominated work	Result	Ref(s)
Tallinn Black Nights Film Festival	2014	Best Youth Film	Songs for Alexis	Nominated	
Tallinn Black Nights Film Festival	2021	Best Live Action Short	The Letter Room	Nominated	
CPH:DOX	2015	Reel Talent Award	Songs for Alexis	Won	
Bratislava International Film Festival	2017	International Documentary Competition	Bobbi Jene	Nominated	
BFI London Film Festival	2017	Grierson Award – Documentary Film	Bobbi Jene	Nominated	
Philadelphia Film Festival	2017	Best Documentary Feature	Bobbi Jene	Won	
Tribeca Film Festival	2017	Best Cinematography in a Documentary Feature	Bobbi Jene	Won	
Tribeca Film Festival	2017	Best Documentary Feature	Bobbi Jene	Won	
Tribeca Film Festival	2020	Best Narrative Short	The Letter Room	Nominated	
Camden International Film Festival	2017	Emerging Cinematic Vision Award	Bobbi Jene	Nominated	
Biografilm Festival	2017	Life Tales Award – International Competition	Bobbi Jene	Nominated	
Camerimage	2018	Award for Outstanding Achievements in Documentary Filmmaking	Bobbi Jene	Nominated	
DocsBarcelona	2018	DocsBarcelona TV3 Award, Best Documentary	Bobbi Jene	Nominated	
Bodil Awards	2019	Best Documentary (Bedste dokumentarfilm)	Bobbi Jene	Nominated	
Bodil Awards	2019	Blockbuster Talent Award (Blockbuster Talentprisen)	Bobbi Jene	Nominated	
Danish Film Awards (Robert)	2019	Best Documentary (Årets dokumentarfilm)	Bobbi Jene	Nominated	
Palm Springs International ShortFest	2020	Best U.S. Short	The Letter Room	Nominated	
HollyShorts Film Festival	2020	Short Film	The Letter Room	Nominated	
Academy Awards	2021	Best Live Action Short Film	The Letter Room	Nominated	
Norwegian Short Film Festival	2021	Golden Chair Award, Best International Short Film	The Letter Room	Nominated	
Sapporo International Short Film Festival and Market	2021	Best Director	The Letter Room	Won	
CineFest Miskolc International Film Festival	2021	Best Short Film	The Letter Room	Nominated	
Overcome Film Festival	2021	Best Short Film	The Letter Room	Won	
KO:SH FILM FEST	2021	Audience Award	The Letter Room	Won	
Sioux City International Film Festival	2021	Best Drama	The Letter Room	Won	
International Uşak Short Film Festival	2021	Best Film	The Letter Room	Nominated	
Donosskino film festival	2021	Best Screenwriter	The Letter Room	Won	
ÉCU – The European Independent Film Festival	2022	Audience Award	The Letter Room	Won	
Festival Internacional de Cortometrajes Radio City	2023	Best Film	The Letter Room	Nominated	
