= Detroit Film Critics Society Award for Best Actor =

Annual US film award

The Detroit Film Critics Society Award for Best Actor is an annual award given by the Detroit Film Critics Society to honor the best actor of that year.

== Winners ==
indicates the winners.

=== 2000s ===
Year	Actor	Film
2007	George Clooney	Michael Clayton
2007	Mathieu Amalric	The Diving Bell and the Butterfly
2007	Daniel Day-Lewis	There Will Be Blood
2007	Emile Hirsch	Into the Wild
2007	Tommy Lee Jones	No Country for Old Men
2008	Mickey Rourke	The Wrestler
2008	Josh Brolin	W.
2008	Leonardo DiCaprio	Revolutionary Road
2008	Frank Langella	Frost/Nixon
2008	Sean Penn	Milk
2009	Colin Firth	A Single Man
2009	George Clooney	Up in the Air
2009	Matt Damon	The Informant!
2009	Joseph Gordon-Levitt	(500) Days of Summer
2009	Sam Rockwell	Moon

=== 2010s ===
Year	Actor	Film
2010	Colin Firth	The King's Speech
2010	Jeff Bridges	True Grit
2010	Jesse Eisenberg	The Social Network
2010	James Franco	127 Hours
2010	Ryan Gosling	Blue Valentine
2011	Michael Fassbender	Shame
2011	George Clooney	The Descendants
2011	Jean Dujardin	The Artist
2011	Brad Pitt	Moneyball
2011	Michael Shannon	Take Shelter
2012	Daniel Day-Lewis	Lincoln
2012	Bradley Cooper	Silver Linings Playbook
2012	John Hawkes	The Sessions
2012	Bill Murray	Hyde Park on Hudson
2012	Joaquin Phoenix	The Master
2013	Matthew McConaughey	Dallas Buyers Club
2013	Leonardo DiCaprio	The Wolf of Wall Street
2013	Chiwetel Ejiofor	12 Years a Slave
2013	Tom Hanks	Captain Phillips
2013	Robert Redford	All Is Lost
2014	Michael Keaton	Birdman or (The Unexpected Virtue of Ignorance)
2014	Benedict Cumberbatch	The Imitation Game
2014	Brendan Gleeson	Calvary
2014	Jake Gyllenhaal	Nightcrawler
2014	Tom Hardy	Locke
2014	Eddie Redmayne	The Theory of Everything
2015	Michael Caine	Youth
2015	Christopher Abbott	James White
2015	Leonardo DiCaprio	The Revenant
2015	Michael Fassbender	Steve Jobs
2015	Tom Hardy	Legend
2016	Casey Affleck	Manchester by the Sea
2016	Joel Edgerton	Loving
2016	Andrew Garfield	Hacksaw Ridge
2016	Ryan Gosling	La La Land
2016	Denzel Washington	Fences
2017	James Franco	The Disaster Artist
2017	Timothée Chalamet	Call Me by Your Name
2017	Daniel Day-Lewis	Phantom Thread
2017	Gary Oldman	Darkest Hour
2017	Robert Pattinson	Good Time
2018	Ethan Hawke	First Reformed
2018	Christian Bale	Vice
2018	Bradley Cooper	A Star is Born
2018	Rami Malek	Bohemian Rhapsody
2018	John David Washington	BlacKkKlansman
2019	Adam Driver	Marriage Story
2019	Robert De Niro	The Irishman
2019	Robert Pattinson	The Lighthouse
2019	Joaquin Phoenix	Joker
2019	Adam Sandler	Uncut Gems

=== 2020s ===
Year	Actress	Film
2020	Delroy Lindo	Da 5 Bloods
2020	Riz Ahmed	Sound of Metal
2020	Chadwick Boseman	Ma Rainey's Black Bottom
2020	Anthony Hopkins	The Father
2020	Steven Yeun	Minari
2021	Peter Dinklage	Cyrano
2021	Nicolas Cage	Pig
2021	Andrew Garfield	Tick, Tick... Boom!
2021	Oscar Isaac	The Card Counter
2021	Will Smith	King Richard
