= Sofia Sondervan =

Dutch-American film producer

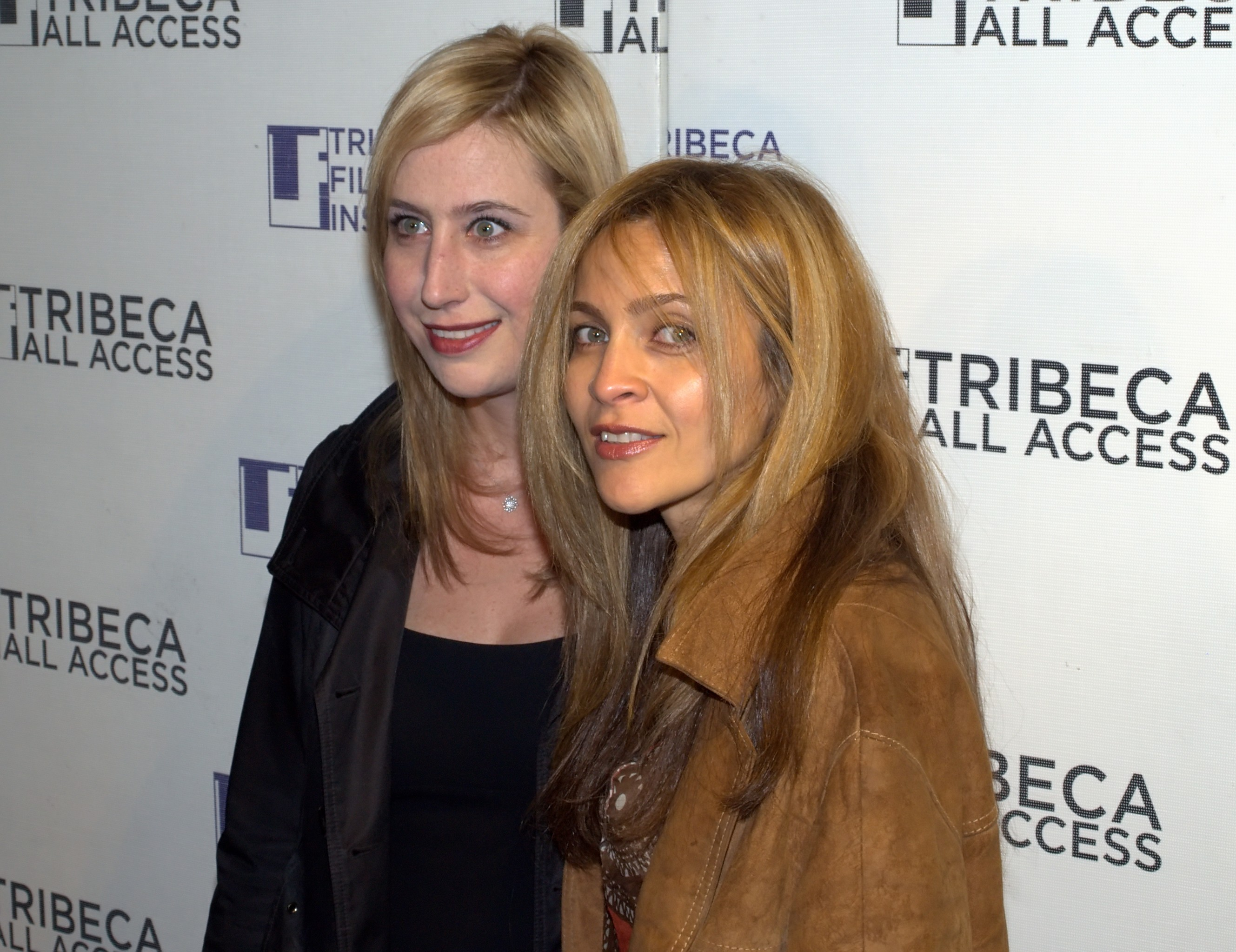
- Sofia Sondervan and Darnell Martin at the 2010 Tribeca Film Festival
- Born: Amsterdam, Netherlands
- Occupation: Film producer
- Years active: 1995-present
- Website: www.sofiasondervan.com

Sofia Sondervan is a Dutch-born American film producer. Currently she is a producer for Dutch Tilt Film. Sofia Sondervan is best known for the 2008 film Cadillac Records, for which she won the Black Reel Award for Best Film in 2009, and which was nominated for a Golden Globe and 7 NAACP Awards.

She is a member of the Producers Guild as well on the committee of the Gotham Awards.

== Filmography ==
=== As producer ===
- The Letter Room (2020) Producer
- London Town (2016) Producer
- Urge (2015) Co-Producer
- The Man Who Knew Infinity (2016)
- Bringing Up bobby (2011)
- Cadillac Records (2008)
- Feel the Noise (2007)
- The King (2005)
- Rick (2005)
- The Hebrew Hammer (2003)
- Party Monster (2003)
- Je maintiendrai (short film) (1995)

=== As director ===
- Je maintiendrai (short film) (1995)

=== As writer ===
- Je maintiendrai (short film) (1995)

== Awards ==
Year	Award	Film	Category	Result	Ref.
2021	Academy Awards	The Letter Room	Best Live Action Short Film	Nominated	
2008	Black Reel Awards	Cadillac Records	Best Film	Won	
