= The Card Counter =

2021 film by Paul Schrader

- Theatrical release poster
- Directed by: Paul Schrader
- Written by: Paul Schrader
- Produced by: Braxton Pope; Lauren Mann; David Wulf
- Starring: Oscar Isaac; Tiffany Haddish; Tye Sheridan; Willem Dafoe
- Cinematography: Alexander Dynan
- Edited by: Benjamin Rodriguez Jr.
- Music by: Robert Levon Been; Giancarlo Vulcano
- Production companies: Saturn Streaming; Astrakan Films AB; RedLine Entertainment; LB Entertainment; Enriched Media Group; One Two Twenty Entertainment
- Distributed by: Focus Features
- Release dates: September 2, 2021 (Venice); September 10, 2021 (United States)
- Running time: 112 minutes
- Country: United States
- Language: English
- Box office: $5 million

The Card Counter is a 2021 American crime drama film written and directed by Paul Schrader. Starring Oscar Isaac, Tiffany Haddish, Tye Sheridan, and Willem Dafoe, it follows U.S. veteran William Tell (Isaac), and former gambler, takes a young friend on the World Series of Poker tour.

The film had its world premiere at the main competition of the 78th Venice International Film Festival on September 2, 2021, where it competed for the Golden Lion. It was theatrically released in the United States by Focus Features on September 10. It received positive reviews from critics.

== Plot ==
William Tell is a gambler who taught himself how to count cards during an eight-year stint in military prison. Seeking to avoid attention—either from fame or from casino bouncers—Tell's gambling philosophy is to bet small and win modestly. Despite gambling nearly every day, he avoids scrutiny by never staying in a casino hotel. He lives out of two small suitcases and exclusively stays in motels, where he removes any decor and covers the furniture in plain sheets secured with twine. At a casino, Tell encounters La Linda, an acquaintance from the gambling world. She runs a stable, a group of gamblers who are backed by investors for a portion of their winnings. She offers to stake Tell but he refuses, unwilling to be burdened by the responsibility.

In Atlantic City, a security-industry convention is being held in the same building as the casino. Tell slips into a seminar held by retired Major John Gordo, but decides to leave almost immediately. On the way out, he is recognized and confronted by a young man, Cirk Baufort, who slips him his name and number. After a nightmare about torture in a prison camp, Tell calls Cirk and agrees to meet.

Cirk knows Tell's true identity: PFC William Tillich, a soldier who was tried and convicted for his role in the prisoner abuse at Abu Ghraib. Cirk explains that his father, Roger, was also at Abu Ghraib; like Tell, he was dishonorably discharged and served time, but the experience led him to drug addiction and made him violently abusive. Cirk's mother left the family, and Roger eventually killed himself. Gordo trained Tillich and the elder Baufort in "enhanced interrogation techniques" but as he was involved as a "civilian consultant" avoided charges or culpability. Blaming Gordo for what happened to his family, Cirk is planning to capture, torture and kill him for revenge and seeks Tell's help. Tell refuses but offers to take Cirk along as he gambles in an attempt to help the young man avoid a violent life.

At their next stop, Tell informs La Linda that he is interested in making an arrangement. He expresses a desire to go on the World Series of Poker (WSOP) tour in order to win enough money to help Cirk cover his debts and start a new life, after which Tell will retire. After early WSOP matches, Tell makes money but loses to Mr. USA, an obnoxious Ukrainian player who has taken on a jingoistic American persona. He bonds with Cirk and feels a growing attraction to La Linda but avoids getting too close as he continues making money gambling.

At a qualifying round in Panama City, Cirk discloses that he still plans to kill Gordo. Tell takes Cirk back to his motel, confronting the younger man with a harsh interrogator persona. He presents Cirk with $150,000 from his gambling winnings, enough for Cirk to pay off his and his mother's debts and return to college. He insists Cirk return to his mother and forget about Gordo, threatening violence if he does not comply; Cirk leaves with the money. Tell, who has begun a relationship with La Linda, advances to the final table of the WSOP. While on a break he receives a message from Cirk, revealing that rather than returning home he went to Gordo's house to kill him. Tell is unsettled during the resumed match and abruptly walks off the casino floor. A news report shows that Gordo has killed an armed home intruder, presumably Cirk.

Tell drives through the night to reach Gordo's house, where he covers the furniture as he does in his motel rooms. Gordo returns home and Tell holds him at gunpoint, revealing who he is and why he is there. Rather than shooting him, Tell takes Gordo into another room for a "dramatic reenactment" of their time in Abu Ghraib. Both men are heard screaming in agony and eventually Tell emerges from the room severely wounded and covered in blood. He calls the police to report a homicide. Tell is incarcerated in the same military prison as before, accepting the routine and ascetic setting as he feels it is what he deserves. La Linda arrives for a visit and the two reach out to each other, each placing a single finger on the glass separating them.

== Cast ==
- Oscar Isaac as William Tell
- Tiffany Haddish as La Linda
- Tye Sheridan as Cirk
- Willem Dafoe as Major John Gordo
- Alexander Babara as Mr. USA
- Bobby C. King as Slippery Joe

== Production ==
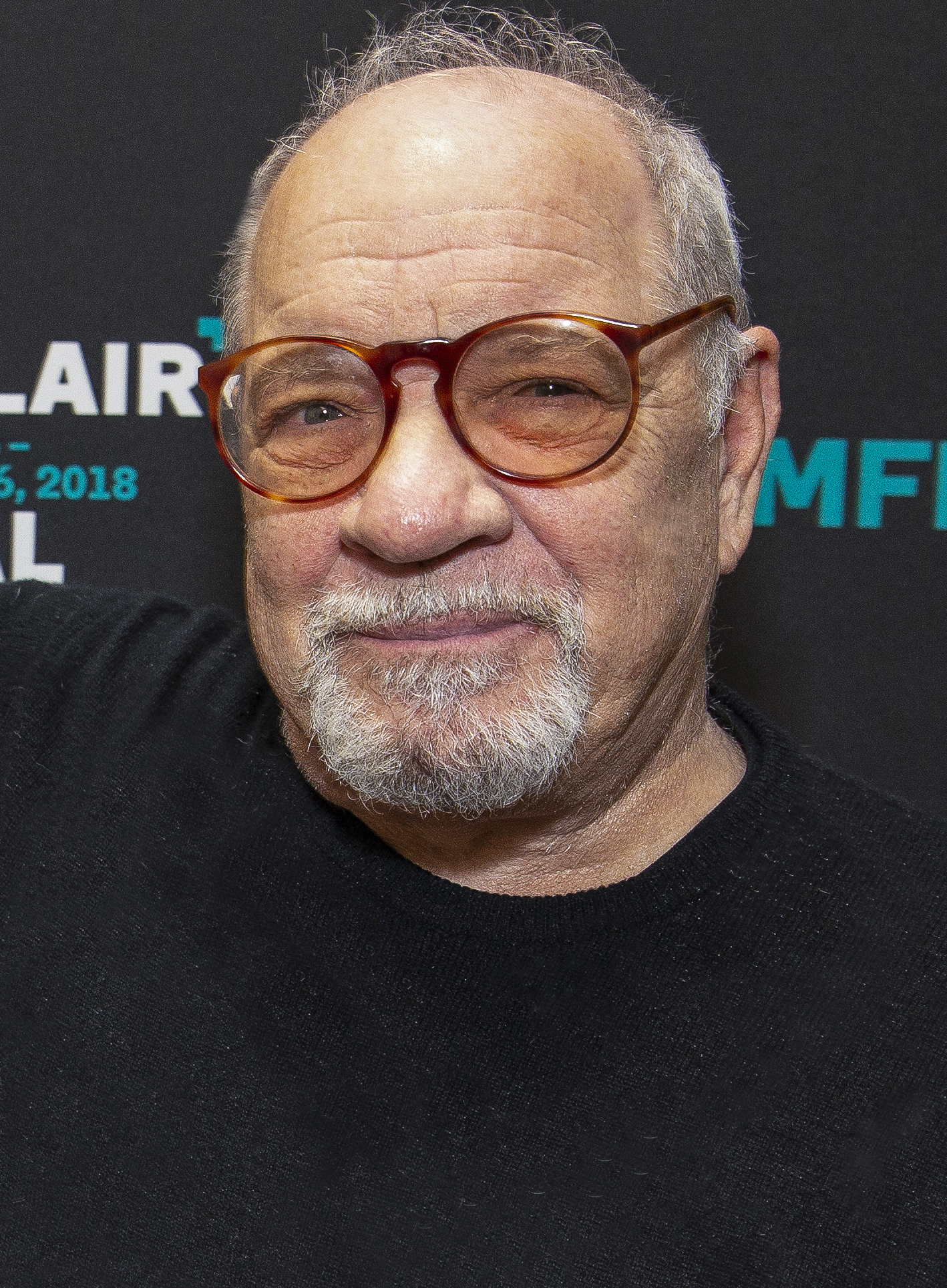
Paul Schrader in 2018, the writer and director of the film

It was announced in October 2019 that Oscar Isaac had been cast in the film, written and directed by Paul Schrader. In January 2020, Schrader announced that Tye Sheridan, Tiffany Haddish and Willem Dafoe had been added to the cast.

Filming began in Biloxi, Mississippi, on February 24, 2020. On March 16, 2020, production on the film was paused after an actor with a small role who had flown in from Los Angeles tested positive for COVID-19 during the pandemic. Production on the film resumed on July 6, 2020, and concluded 6 days later on July 12, 2020.

== Release ==
In July 2020, Focus Features acquired distribution rights to the film in the U.S., U.K., France, Switzerland, Italy, Spain, Australia, New Zealand, China, Southeast Asia (excluding Singapore, Hong Kong, Taiwan and television), Japan, South Korea, Latin America and worldwide airlines. The film premiered at the Venice Film Festival on September 2, 2021, and was given a wide release on September 10, 2021.

== Reception ==
=== Box office ===
In the United States and Canada the film was released alongside Malignant and Show Me the Father. It grossed $1,039,580 from 580 theatres during its opening weekend, and $2,657,850 in total domestically and $2,394,691 internationally for a worldwide gross of $5,052,541.

=== Critical response ===
On Rotten Tomatoes, the film has an approval rating of 87% based on 223 reviews, with an average rating of 7.5/10. The website's critical consensus reads, "Led by Oscar Isaac's gripping performance, The Card Counter adds another weighty chapter to Paul Schrader's long inquiry into man's moral responsibility." On Metacritic, the film has a weighted average score of 77 out of 100, based on 48 critics, indicating "generally favorable" reviews.

Reviewing the film for the Chicago Sun-Times, critic Richard Roeper gave The Card Counter four stars, labeling it as "searing," "stunning" and praising Oscar Isaac's performance as "magnetic" in what Roeper called "one of the best films of the year."

David Rooney also gave the film a positive review for The Hollywood Reporter, calling it a "bruising character study" and, although noting some moments of slack storytelling, praised the film as a "highly controlled piece of filmmaking with an unerring command of tone" and Isaac as a "remarkably compelling force." For The Atlantic, David Sims also praised the film as a compelling, impressive character study with larger implications as a metaphor for "America's struggle to overcome its grimmest failures."

In a three-star review for The Washington Post, Ann Hornaday had a mixed response to the film and criticized it for being occasionally perfunctory and tedious, overly schematic and missing polish. However, she commended the film for its "haunting power" and praised the acting, calling Isaac "mesmerizing."

The Card Counter was included on a number of year-end critic best of lists, including Time, — which also named Isaac's performance as one of the top 10 of the year, The New Yorker, RogerEbert.com, IndieWire, The A.V. Club, and Cahiers du Cinéma included the film as one of the best of 2021.

=== Accolades ===
Award	Date of ceremony	Category	Recipient(s)	Result	Ref.
Hollywood Music in Media Awards	November 17, 2021	Best Original Score in an Independent Film	Robert Levon Been & Giancarlo Vulcano	Nominated	
Gotham Awards	November 29, 2021	Best Screenplay	Paul Schrader	Nominated	
Gotham Awards	November 29, 2021	Outstanding Lead Performance	Oscar Isaac	Nominated	
National Board of Review	December 2, 2021	Top 10 Independent Films	The Card Counter	Won	
Detroit Film Critics Society	December 6, 2021	Best Actor	Oscar Isaac	Nominated	
Chicago Film Critics Association	December 15, 2021	Best Original Screenplay	Paul Schrader	Nominated	
Florida Film Critics Circle Awards	December 22, 2021	Best Actor	Oscar Isaac	Nominated	
Dublin Film Critics' Circle	December 21, 2021	Best Actor	Oscar Isaac	3rd place	
London Film Critics' Circle	February 6, 2022	Actor of the Year	Oscar Isaac	Nominated	
