= Inside Llewyn Davis =

2013 film by Joel and Ethan Coen

- Theatrical release poster
- Directed by: Joel Coen; Ethan Coen
- Written by: Joel Coen; Ethan Coen
- Produced by: Scott Rudin; Joel Coen; Ethan Coen
- Starring: Oscar Isaac; Carey Mulligan; John Goodman; Garrett Hedlund; F. Murray Abraham; Justin Timberlake
- Cinematography: Bruno Delbonnel
- Edited by: Roderick Jaynes (Note: Roderick Jaynes is the shared pseudonym used by the Coen brothers for their editing.)
- Production companies: StudioCanal; Anton Capital Entertainment; Scott Rudin Productions; Mike Zoss Productions
- Distributed by: CBS Films (United States); StudioCanal (United Kingdom and France)
- Release dates: May 19, 2013 (Cannes); November 6, 2013 (France); December 6, 2013 (United States); January 24, 2014 (United Kingdom)
- Running time: 105 minutes
- Countries: United States; France; United Kingdom
- Language: English
- Budget: $11 million
- Box office: $33 million

Inside Llewyn Davis (/ˈluːɪn/) is a 2013 period black comedy drama film written, directed, produced, and edited by Joel and Ethan Coen. Set in 1961, the film follows one week in the life of Llewyn Davis, played by Oscar Isaac in his breakthrough role, a folk singer struggling to achieve musical success while keeping his life in order. The supporting cast includes Carey Mulligan, John Goodman, Garrett Hedlund, F. Murray Abraham, Justin Timberlake and Adam Driver.

Though Davis is a fictional character, the story was partly inspired by folk singer Dave Van Ronk's autobiography. Most of the folk songs performed in the film are sung in full and recorded live. T Bone Burnett was the executive music producer. Principal photography took place in early 2012, primarily in New York City. The film, an international co-production among companies in France, the United Kingdom and the United States, was financed by StudioCanal before it received an American distributor.

Inside Llewyn Davis premiered at the 2013 Cannes Film Festival on May 19, 2013, where it won the Grand Prix. The film was theatrically released in France on November 6, 2013, and in the United Kingdom on January 24, 2014, by StudioCanal. It was given a limited release by CBS Films in the United States on December 6, 2013, before opening in a wide release on January 10, 2014. The film received critical acclaim and was nominated for two Academy Awards (Best Cinematography and Best Sound Mixing) and three Golden Globe Awards for Best Motion Picture – Comedy or Musical, Best Actor – Motion Picture Musical or Comedy (Isaac), and Best Original Song. Inside Llewyn Davis has been held in high critical esteem since its release as one of the greatest films ever made, being voted the 11th-best film of the 21st century in both a 2016 BBC poll and a 2017 The New York Times list. The film was ranked 14 on Rolling Stone magazine's list of "50 Best Movies of the 2010s" and 2 on The Hollywood Reporter's list of the "50 Best Films of the 21st Century (So Far)."

== Plot ==
In February 1961, Llewyn Davis is a struggling folk singer in New York City's Greenwich Village. His solo album Inside Llewyn Davis is not selling; he is penniless and sleeps on acquaintances' couches. After playing The Gaslight Café one night, he is beaten up in the alley behind the café by a man in a suit.

Llewyn awakens in the apartment of two friends, the Gorfeins. As he leaves, their ginger cat escapes and is locked out. He takes it to the apartment of Jim and Jean Berkey, where Jean reluctantly allows Llewyn to stay the night. Jean tells Llewyn that she is pregnant, and that he could be the father. The next morning, Llewyn opens a window and the Gorfeins' cat escapes. Later, Jean asks Llewyn to pay for an abortion, though she is upset it may be Jim's child she is terminating.

Llewyn visits his sister to borrow money. Instead, she gives him a box of his belongings, which he tells her to discard. She mentions that he could make money by returning to the Merchant Marine. On Jim's invitation, Llewyn records a space travel-themed novelty song with Jim and Al Cody. Needing money for the abortion, Llewyn turns down royalties in favor of an immediate $200. He makes an appointment for the abortion, only to learn that payment will not be necessary. He already paid for the same procedure two years earlier on behalf of another woman who decided to keep the child.

Llewyn captures what he believes to be the Gorfeins' ginger cat and returns it to them that evening. Asked to perform after dinner, he reluctantly plays "Fare Thee Well", a song he had recorded with his old partner Mike Timlin. When Mrs. Gorfein sings Mike's harmony, Llewyn angrily tells her not to. She leaves the table crying, then returns with the cat, which is not theirs. Llewyn leaves with the cat.

Llewyn drives to Chicago with two musicians: beat poet Johnny Five and jazz musician Roland Turner. During the trip, he discloses that Mike died by suicide.

At a roadside restaurant, Roland collapses from a heroin overdose. The three stop on the side of the highway to rest. When a police officer tells them to move on, he suspects that Johnny is drunk and orders him out of the car. Johnny resists and is arrested. Without the keys, Llewyn abandons the car, leaving the cat and the unconscious Roland behind. In Chicago, Llewyn auditions for Bud Grossman, who offers a place in a trio he is forming. Rejecting the offer, Llewyn hitchhikes back to New York. Driving while the car owner sleeps, he hits a ginger cat; it limps into the woods as Llewyn watches from afar.

In New York, Llewyn uses his last $148 for back dues to rejoin the Merchant Marine union. He searches for his seaman's license so he can ship out, but it had been in the box he told his sister to trash. Llewyn returns to the Union Hall to replace it, but cannot afford the $85 fee. He visits Jean, who tells him she got him a gig at the Gaslight.

At the Gaslight, Llewyn learns that Pappi, the manager, also had sex with Jean. Disillusioned, Llewyn gets drunk and heckles a woman singing on stage. He visits the Gorfeins, who graciously welcome him. He learns that the novelty song is likely to be a major hit with massive royalties, which he will see no part of. Llewyn is amazed to see that their actual cat, Ulysses, found his way home.

The opening scene is revealed to be the ending. Llewyn performs at the Gaslight. Pappi teases him for heckling the previous evening’s singer and says that a friend of his is waiting in the alley. As Llewyn walks outside, a young Bob Dylan starts performing on stage. Behind the Gaslight, Llewyn is beaten by the suited man for having cruelly heckled his wife, the previous night’s performer. He watches as the man leaves in a taxi, bidding him "Au revoir".

== Cast ==
- Oscar Isaac as Llewyn Davis
- Carey Mulligan as Jean Berkey
- John Goodman as Roland Turner
- Garrett Hedlund as Johnny Five
- Justin Timberlake as Jim Berkey
- Adam Driver as Al Cody
- F. Murray Abraham as Bud Grossman
- Stark Sands as Troy Nelson
- Ethan Phillips as Mitch Gorfein
- Robin Bartlett as Lillian Gorfein
- Jerry Grayson as Mel Novikoff
- Alex Karpovsky as Marty Green
- Max Casella as Pappi Corsicato
- Frank L. Ridley as Union Hall Man
- Jake Ryan as Danny
- Jeanine Serralles as Joy
- Ben Pike as Bob Dylan
- Bradley Mott as Joe Flom
- Marcus Mumford as Mike Timlin (voice)

== Sources ==
Well before writing the script, the Coens began with a single idea, of Dave Van Ronk being beaten up outside of Gerde's Folk City in the Village. They employed the image in the opening scenes, then periodically returned to the project over the next couple of years to expand the story using a fictional character. One source for the film was Van Ronk's posthumously published memoir, The Mayor of MacDougal Street (2005).

According to the book's co-author, Elijah Wald, the Coens mined the work "for local color and a few scenes". The character is a composite of Van Ronk, Ramblin' Jack Elliott, and other musicians from New York City who performed in the Village at that time. Joel Coen said, "the film doesn't really have a plot. That concerned us at one point; that's why we threw the cat in."

== Production ==
Shooting was complicated by an early New York spring, which interfered with the bleak winter atmosphere that prevails throughout the film, and by the difficulty of filming several cats, which, unlike dogs, ignore filmmakers' directions. On an animal trainer's advice, the Coens put out a casting call for an orange tabby cat, since they are sufficiently common that several could play one part. Individual cats were then selected for each scene based on what they were disposed to do on their own. After a chance run-in with a cabdriver who lived at their old address, the Coens used the apartment they'd rented several decades earlier.

Producer Scott Rudin, who worked with the Coens on No Country for Old Men and True Grit, collaborated on the project. StudioCanal helped finance it without an American distributor in place. "After shooting in New York City and elsewhere last year ... the brothers finished the movie at their own pace," wrote Michael Cieply in a January 2013 New York Times interview with Joel Coen ahead of a private, pre-Grammys screening in Los Angeles. "They could have rushed it into the Oscar season but didn't." On February 19, CBS Films announced it had picked up the U.S. domestic distribution rights for about $4 million. StudioCanal has rights to international distribution and foreign sales.

=== Music ===
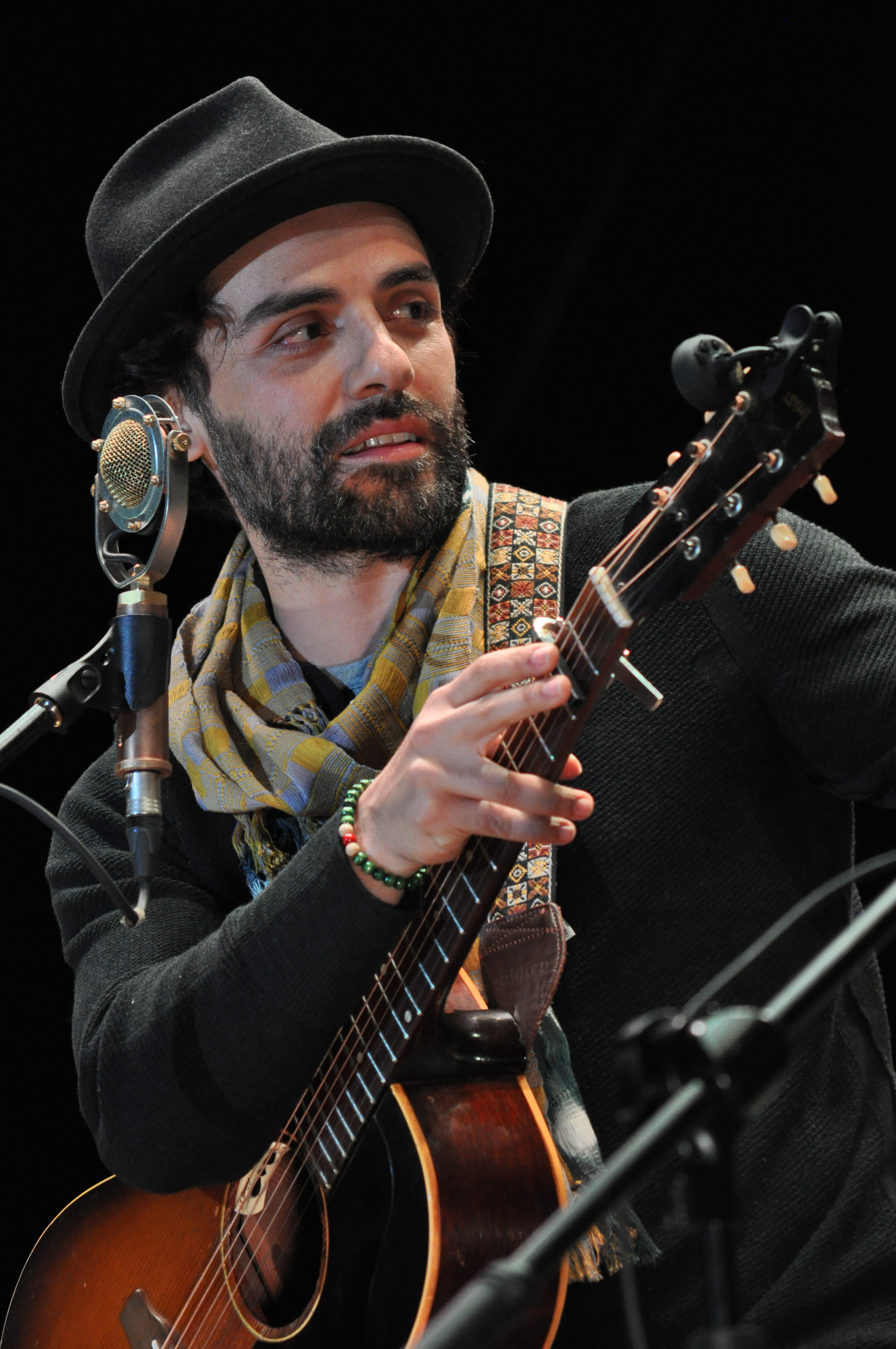
Isaac and other cast members performed the music live, and did not use lip-synching.

Dave Van Ronk's music served as the Coens' starting point for the script, and many of the songs first designated for the film were his. Van Ronk biographer Elijah Wald said that Llewyn Davis "is not at all Dave, but the music is". (The cover of Davis's solo album, Inside Llewyn Davis, resembles that of Inside Dave Van Ronk. Both feature the artist in a doorway, wearing a tweed jacket and smoking a cigarette. One difference between the two covers is that there is a cat in the doorway on the cover of Inside Dave Van Ronk.) Other songs emerged in conversations between the Coens and T Bone Burnett, who produced the music in association with Marcus Mumford. Burnett previously worked with the Coens on the soundtracks for The Big Lebowski and O Brother, Where Art Thou?, the latter of which sold about 8 million copies in the United States. The Coens viewed the music in Inside Llewyn Davis as a direct descendant of the music in O Brother.

The humorous novelty song "Please Mr. Kennedy", a plea from a reluctant astronaut, appears to be a fourth-generation derivative of the 1960 song "Mr. Custer", also known as "Please Mr. Custer", about the Battle of the Little Bighorn, sung by Larry Verne and written by Al De Lory, Fred Darian, and Joseph Van Winkle. A Tamla-Motown single followed in 1961: "Please Mr. Kennedy (I Don't Want to Go)", a plea from a reluctant Vietnam War draftee, sung by Mickey Woods and credited to Berry Gordy, Loucye Wakefield and Ronald Wakefield. In 1962, using a similar theme, The Goldcoast Singers recorded "Please Mr. Kennedy" on their album Here They Are, with writing credits to Ed Rush and George Cromarty. The Llewyn Davis version credits Rush, Cromarty, Burnett, Timberlake, and the Coens.

Isaac, Timberlake, Mulligan, Driver and others performed the music live. The exception was "The Auld Triangle", which was lip-synced, with Timberlake singing bass. (Timberlake's vocal range was on display in the film. Critic Janet Maslin, listening to the soundtrack, mistook Timberlake's voice for Mulligan's, which she thought resembled that of Mary Travers).

== Release and reception ==
Inside Llewyn Davis had its worldwide premiere on May 19 at the 2013 Cannes Film Festival. It then screened at other film festivals, including the New York Film Festival in September, the AFI Film Festival, on its November 14 close, and the Torino Film Festival, also in November.

The film began a limited release in the United States on December 6, 2013, in Los Angeles and New York. It opened in 133 additional theaters on December 20 and wide on January 10, 2014.

On January 19, 2016, The Criterion Collection released a DVD and Blu-ray of the film, featuring new audio commentary tracks, interviews and other special features, including a 43-minute documentary, Inside "Inside Llewyn Davis". StudioCanal released a 4K Ultra HD Blu-Ray of the film on October 5, 2026 in the UK.

=== Critical response ===
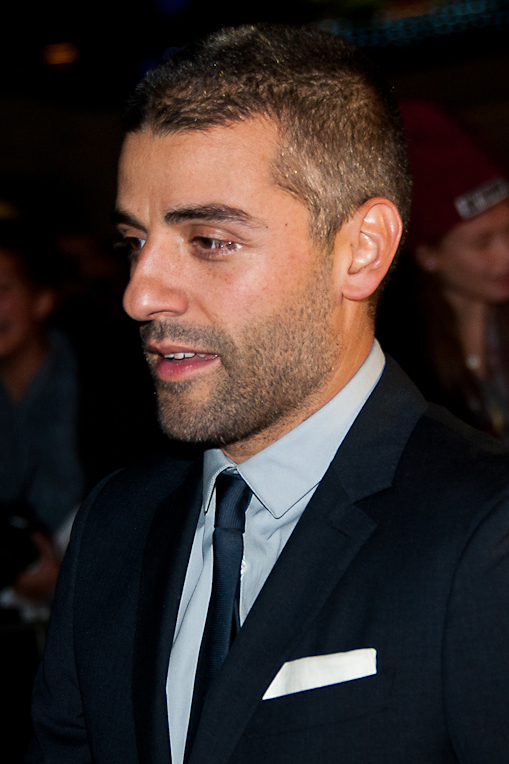
Isaac's performance received widespread acclaim from critics.

Rotten Tomatoes gives the film a rating of 92%, based on 295 reviews, with an average score of 8.5/10. The critical consensus states: "Smart, funny, and profoundly melancholy, Inside Llewyn Davis finds the Coen brothers in fine form." Metacritic gives the film a score of 93 out of 100, based on reviews from 52 critics, indicating "universal acclaim".

A. O. Scott noted similarities between Davis and Van Ronk but wrote it's "not a biopic, it's a Coen brothers movie, which is to say a brilliant magpie's nest of surrealism, period detail and pop-culture scholarship. To put it another way, it's a folk tale...An important character is named Ulysses, whose ancient wanderings inspired O Brother, Where Art Thou?, the Coens' earlier venture (also in the company of music supervisor T Bone Burnett) into American vernacular musical traditions...But since this is a Coen brothers film, it is predestined that Llewyn will fail and that we will laugh both at and with him as he deals with a world full of cretins, including the one he sees reflected in the windows of the subway train...I won't speculate further on what Inside Llewyn Davis might mean. But at least one of its lessons seems clear to me, after several viewings, as clear and bright as a G major chord. We are, as a species, ridiculous: vain, ugly, selfish and self-deluding. But somehow, some of our attempts to take stock of this condition—our songs and stories and moving pictures old and new—manage to be beautiful, even sublime."

Writing for The Village Voice, Alan Scherstuhl praised the film: "While often funny and alive with winning performances, Inside Llewyn Davis finds the brothers in a dark mood, exploring the near-inevitable disappointment that faces artists too sincere to compromise—disappointments that the Coens, to their credit, have made a career out of dodging. The result is their most affecting film since the masterful A Serious Man." Todd McCarthy of The Hollywood Reporter called the film "an outstanding fictional take on the early 1960s folk music scene", praising the "fresh, resonant folk soundtrack", and said Isaac's performance "deftly manages the task of making Llewyn compulsively watchable". Leigh Singer of IGN gave the film a 10 out of 10 'Masterpiece' score, saying "Don't be fooled by the seemingly minor key ... this is one of the finest works by—let's just call it—the most consistently innovative, versatile and thrilling American filmmakers of the last quarter-century."

Folk singers have criticized the film for representing the Village folk scene of the time as a less friendly place than it actually was. Terri Thal, Dave Van Ronk's ex-wife, said, "I didn't expect it to be almost unrecognizable as the folk-music world of the early 1960s." Suzanne Vega said, "I feel they took a vibrant, crackling, competitive, romantic, communal, crazy, drunken, brawling scene and crumpled it into a slow brown sad movie." The film was also criticized because, though to some extent based on Van Ronk's memoir, it portrayed a character very different from Van Ronk, who, in contrast with the character Llewyn Davis, is usually described as a "nice guy". At a press interview before the premiere at Cannes, the Coens said Davis was an original creation, and that the music was the major influence they had drawn from Van Ronk.

It was voted the 11th greatest film of the 21st century in a 2016 BBC poll. It also ranked 11th on The New York Times's list of the Best Films of the 21st Century So Far. In 2021, members of Writers Guild of America West (WGAW) and Writers Guild of America, East (WGAE) voted its screenplay 72nd in WGA’s 101 Greatest Screenplays of the 21st Century (so far).

In February 2025, The Washington Post ranked it at number 8 on its list of "The 25 best movie musicals of the 21st century," with Ty Burr writing "The best way in 2025 to come at the Coen brothers' fond evocation of the 1960s Greenwich Village folk scene is to think of it as A Complete Unknown with an unmagnetic jerk at its center. Oscar Isaac plays the purist folkie of the title without a whisper of self-pity, and the film is full of music old and new, lovingly curated by T-Bone Burnett and as faithful to its period as Burnett's work for O Brother, Where Art Thou? What's inside Llewyn Davis? A hole that he fills with music that's never quite his." In June 2025, it ranked number 83 on The New York Times' list of "The 100 Best Movies of the 21st Century" and number 95 on the "Readers' Choice" edition of the list. In July 2025, it ranked number 18 on Rolling Stone's list of "The 100 Best Movies of the 21st Century."

== See also ==
- List of films set in New York City
- New York City Subway in popular culture
