= Llewyn Davis =

Fictional protagonist of Inside Llewyn Davis

- Oscar Isaac as Llewyn Davis
- Created by: Coen brothers
- Portrayed by: Oscar Isaac

In-universe information
- Gender: Male
- Occupation: Merchant mariner (former); Folk singer-songwriter; Guitarist

Llewyn Davis (/ˈluːɪn/) is a fictional title character and the protagonist of the 2013 Coen brothers' film Inside Llewyn Davis. He is a young, struggling folk singer trying to become more famous and financially successful after the flop of his debut album, Inside Llewyn Davis. He was portrayed by Oscar Isaac.

== Casting and creation ==
When creating the character of Llewyn Davis, Joel Coen summed up the idea as "suppose Dave Van Ronk gets beat up outside of Gerde's Folk City. That's the beginning of a movie." The Coen Brothers used "Van Ronk's posthumous memoir, The Mayor of MacDougal Street" as an influence for the screenplay and Llewyn Davis' journey. The album cover and title of Inside Llewyn Davis is also directly inspired by Dave Van Ronk's album Inside Dave Van Ronk. In describing how Isaac was cast, music critic Robert Christgau writes that "The Coens... emphasize that Van Ronk's story was only the seed of a fiction, and were pleased to cast Isaac in the title role partly because he's so unlike Van Ronk physically."

In his high school days, Isaac was previously involved in two punk bands and lived a straight-edge lifestyle. Grammy winning producer T Bone Burnett, who worked with the Coen brothers on O Brother, Where Art Thou? said of Isaac, "I haven't worked with an actor who could play and sing this style of music this well." "You can't do it with bluster; you have to do it with the rawest honesty you can." Isaac also developed a style of finger-picking that Burnett explains is "a little bit like patting your head and rubbing someone else's stomach—in another country." Isaac described his audition process thus: "I first auditioned for the casting director, did a few scenes. Then I went home and recorded myself playing "Hang Me." That got sent to the Coens. Then I came in and auditioned for them, learned a few extra songs just in case. They sent that over to T Bone. And T Bone said, [invoking a famous line from The Producers] 'I think we've found our Hitler!'" Oscar Isaac "was the opposite of what [the Coen brothers] had initially been looking for: a classically trained actor. But he could also sing and play guitar." In an interview with Rolling Stone, Isaac further noted, "Well, I knew that it was loosely based on Dave Van Ronk [and his memoir The Mayor of MacDougal Street], and he was like a six-foot-five, 250 pound Swede. So I came in, and out of the corner of my eye I saw a photograph of a very well-known musician—and I was encouraged because it was a guy who was a little smaller and a dark haired and had a beard. I was like, "So you guys have that picture as kind of a reference?" And they're like, "Oh yeah. He came in. He killed it." The blood just drained out of my face. But then I did the audition and it went well and they called me back." He also describes being influenced by Erik Franzen, an old friend of Dave Van Ronk's, who Isaac says "started teaching me this Travis-style picking, which I was not aware of—didn't know how to do it. It's this crazy syncopation. We'd play and I paid him for lessons and then we started playing in the Village. I opened for him a couple times at these open mics. He was like a trainer—the last day before the audition I played for him and then he looked at me and goes "I see the big guy behind you giving the thumb's up."

== Characterization and portrayal ==
Oscar Isaac described his character as "such an internal guy...an island, shut off from everyone else." Isaac, described antithetically against his character as "a naturally warm personality", said that he prepared for the role by simply approaching random strangers at parties and talking to them, without trying to impress them or putting on a friendly facade." Isaac notes that the character is someone who desires authenticity so much so that the opinions of others do not matter to him. However, Isaac believes that this is not a quality of confidence from Davis, but of spite and apathy, which further "alienates him" and "causes him to lack some empathy". The character has been described as "brooding, depressed, and irritable", and his "blend of artistic idealism and brooding cynicism are irreconcilable, and seem certain to keep him locked in place – alone, broke, staring out into an uncertain future."

Critic Amy Klein writes that Davis' "story serves as a dramatic counterpoint to certain beliefs about America that young Americans do not trust anymore: it is, and has always been, a myth that hard work and talent get a person ahead, but Llewyn Davis has to learn firsthand that he's been fed a bunch of lies. In this way, he's an excellent role model for millennials: a guy with talent and an independent spirit, broke but not yet broken, cynical as all hell but still doing what he loves anyway. Fate seems to love nothing more than to kick him when he's down, and yet, he somehow gets up and keeps on going. Believe it or not, the art of failure is actually harder to master than it looks because you really have to keep on trying in order to fail consistently." Christopher Orr of The Atlantic writes that, "As an artist, he's remote and self-absorbed, despite his clear talent. When he visits Chicago to play for the powerful manager Bud Grossman (F. Murray Abraham), the latter tells him "I don't see a lot of money here" and implicitly compares him to a genial G.I.-turned-musician: "He connects with people." As a person, Llewyn is easily wounded and spectacularly selfish, an "asshole" who, among other trespasses, gets his best friend's girl (Carey Mulligan) pregnant and then surreptitiously asks said best friend (Justin Timberlake) for money to pay for her abortion. Inside Llewyn Davis is thus simultaneously the name of the film, of Llewyn's solo album, and of his psychological condition: He is himself trapped inside Llewyn Davis."

Robert Christgau observed of Llewyn that "[T]here's an anger in Llewyn that appears to predate his partner Mike's suicide" and thought that the character was probably unstable and moody for a long time. However, Sam Adams of Indie Wire disagreed with this assertion, believing that Davis' sour and cold personality was the direct result of Mike Timlin (singing voice of Marcus Mumford)'s suicide. He speculates, "in the small circle of Llewyn, Jim, Jean and the Gorfeins, and probably in the coffee-house community at large, Mike was the glue that held them together", and believes that Davis fell apart after Mike's death. He connects this observation to a scene in which "after Bud Grossman tells Llewyn he doesn't have the charisma to front his own act, Llewyn says he used to have a partner and Bud responds, "Yeah, that makes sense."" Adams further analyzes that Llewyn Davis' story is not one of a man who continues to fail and is destined to fail, but about a man struggling with depression and unable to move forward as an artist or in life. He believes that his depression has cast him into "a Sisyphean loop, a depressive Groundhog Day" and that the character finally begins to accept that his life and career won't progress.

== Musicality ==
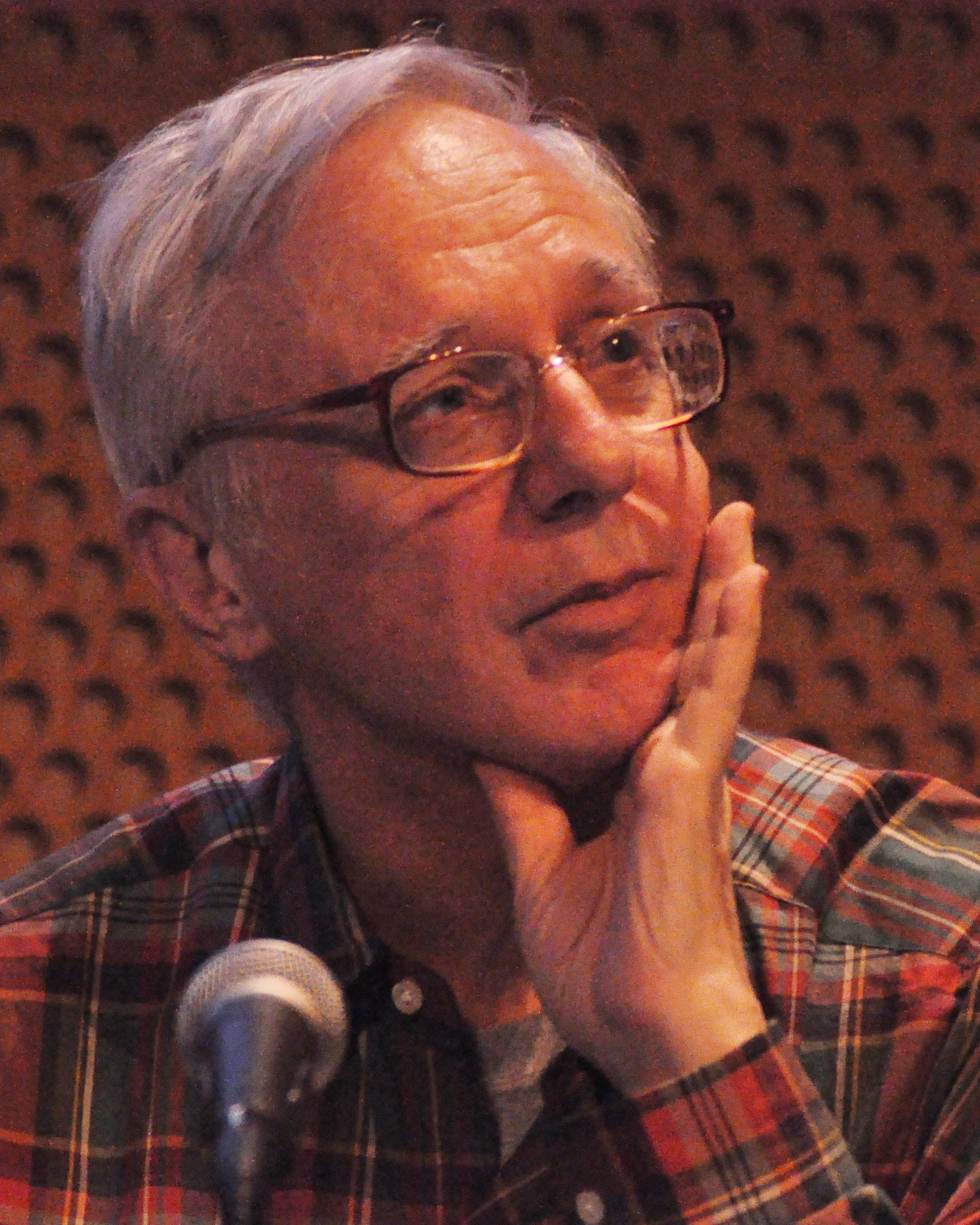
Critic Robert Christgau wrote that the film suggests Llewyn Davis' anger is "what drives his passion for his incoherent notion of authenticity."

One of the key elements to Llewyn Davis' musicality is his desire to maintain authenticity as an artist. Despite being partially based on Dave Van Ronk, some reviewers noted several distinctions between the two in their artistry: "It's been bandied about that the character of Llewyn is based on Dave Van Ronk, "The Mayor of Macdougal Street," a mainstay and centerpiece of the Greenwich Village folk scene. This is nonsense. Llewyn shares one or two biographical details with Van Ronk, but has none of his personality. More importantly, he has none of Van Ronk's expansiveness, his desire to reach out, to promote, to connect. Llewyn is a very inward singer, up in his own head. He demands that the audience comes to him. That demand, in fact, is, I think what the protagonist wants. Llewyn Davis wants success, craves it, but insists that it be on his own terms." Robert Christgau also noted that the character desired authenticity as among the most important and valued aspects of being a musician: "[W]e know that when Jean warns him to plan for his future, Llewyn equates that inescapability with flying cars and Tang and brands Jean "careerist," "square," and "suburban" for thinking about it. We also know Llewyn's definition of a folk song because it's damn near the first words out of his mouth that don't have a tune attached: "If it's never been new and it never gets old, it's a folk song." However, Christgau notes that his desire for authenticity is hypocritical, calling Davis an "angry character", while pondering the cause of the character's anger. Christgau continued, "We don't know [the reason for the character's anger]—lots of men are angry. But maybe, the film suggests, that's what drives his passion for his incoherent notion of authenticity. After all, the worst tirade of his bad week by far is the sexist bile he spews at the most certifiably "authentic" musician we get to see: autoharp-strumming Elizabeth Hobby from Arkansas, played by Missouri-born modern folk performer Nancy Blake. "I hate fuckin' folk music," he shouts.

The Coen Brothers distinguished the character from his source of inspiration, Dave Van Ronk, by casting an actor who had an entirely different singing voice and style of guitar playing. The Coen Brothers described that Oscar Isaac as Davis has "this beautiful tenor voice" in contrast to the rough, growling voice of Dave Van Ronk, whom they described as "the ultimate blues shouter." Ethan Coen noted that music was the most important aspect of Llewyn Davis' character, in that it completely defined him. He discussed that to Llewyn Davis, folk music is "his life" and that it "reveals something about him that [the audience doesn't] see somewhere else". The Coen Brothers felt that Llewyn Davis' sarcastic, acerbic, and unpleasant attitude was contradicted by his sweet, alluring singing voice, causing many people to question whether they should like the character or hate him. In the same way, the character of Roland Turner (John Goodman), a jazz musician and heroin addict who antagonizes Llewyn when he hitchhikes a ride with him to Chicago, has been interpreted as a possible older version of the Llewyn Davis character. In an interview with Moviefone, Goodman says that his character is "a possible alternate future for Llewyn. He could turn out this way too." Philip Pantuso of Esquire considers Davis to be a cyclical, Sisyphean type character, who has an ironic journey in which he is doomed to failure and doesn't know it; whereas the audience is in on the joke. He describes the character as "stuck in a nightmare version of Nietzsche's eternal return". He notes that Davis' musicality is of utmost importance to him, and that he has a mission to maintain the authenticity that he ascribes to the village, which will ironically "desert Llewyn and all he stands for...following the trailblazing path of the famous Bob Dylan."

== Reception ==
Oscar Isaac was praised for his portrayal of Llewyn Davis, and the character received universal acclaim from film critics. Kenneth Turan of the Los Angeles Times wrote that Davis is "beautifully played by Oscar Isaac". Reviewer Phillip Kemp writes, "Isaac, who proves to have a strong singing voice, performs the folksongs in perfect period style and succeeds in making Llewyn, for all his prickliness, an unexpectedly likeable, melancholic figure." Steve Persall writes that, "Inside Llewyn Davis opens intimately with Llewyn, a role inhabited in body and voice by Oscar Isaac, performing on the Gaslight Cafe stage. Music is more vital than ever in the Coens' storytelling, with frequent collaborator T-Bone Burnett coordinating an expressive folk music sampler, and actors performing songs as character shading. Isaac's opener, the plaintive traditional Hang Me … Oh Hang Me, reveals as much of his restless spirit as his talent." Marc Mohan writes that, "Davis is played by Oscar Isaac, who has toiled in supporting roles for the last few years but anchors this film with a star-making, soulful performance that includes haunting renditions of traditional tunes such as "Hang Me, Oh Hang Me" (which opens the movie) and "The Death of Queen Jane." Calvin Wilson of the St. Louis Post Dispatch notes that "Isaac, who also shared the screen with Mulligan in Drive, may remind some moviegoers of the young Al Pacino. And like Pacino, he has a gift for being appealing even when he's unpleasant." Critic Glenn Kenny writes, "We cannot imagine Llewyn Davis happy. The self-defeating Sisyphus of the new film written, directed, and edited by Joel and Ethan Coen is the first person the viewer lays eyes on in the movie. Bearded, his unkempt hair falling in his eyes, he picks out some steely, blue notes on a guitar as he sings "Hang Me, Oh Hang Me," not to be confused with "Dang Me." "Wouldn't mind the hangin', except for layin' in the grave so long," he sings, with a good amount of sincerity. The time is 1961, the place is New York City, and the venue where Llewyn—portrayed with haunting conviction by Oscar Isaac, who, like everyone else in the cast, does his own singing and playing—is picking and not grinning is the Gaslight, a soon-to-be-legendary landmark in the "folk revival." A. O. Scott of The New York Times writes, "Llewyn's repertoire and some aspects of his background are borrowed from Dave Van Ronk, who loomed large on the New York folk scene in its pre-Bob Dylan hootenanny-and-autoharp phase. Oscar Isaac, who plays both Llewyn and the guitar with offhand virtuosity, is slighter of build and scowlier of mien than Van Ronk, with a fine, clear tenor singing voice...Mr. Isaac, a versatile character actor here ascending to the highest levels of his craft, refuses the easy road of charm. Like his character, he trusts his own professionalism and the integrity of the material."

Despite receiving universal acclaim from critics, Llewyn Davis was panned by those who experienced the Greenwich Village in the 1960s or knew Dave Van Ronk personally. Folk artist Christine Lavin, a friend of Van Ronk, wrote, "I HATE THIS FILM ... Am outraged that the Coens took such a colorful character and interpreted him as a doofus," in reference to what she viewed as a disrespectful interpretation of the late folk singer. Suzanne Vega, a folk singer who experienced the Greenwich Village of the 1970s and also befriended Van Ronk around the time said, "I feel they took a vibrant, crackling, competitive, romantic, communal, crazy, drunken, brawling scene and crumpled it into a slow brown sad movie". Van Ronk's ex-wife, Terri Thal, writes, "What bothers me is that the movie doesn't show those days, those people, that world. In the movie, Llewyn Davis is a not-very smart, somewhat selfish, confused young man for whom music is a way to make a living. It's not a calling, as it was for David and for some others. No one in the film seems to love music. The character who represents Tom Paxton has a pasted-on smile and is a smug person who doesn't at all resemble the smart, funny, witty Tom Paxton who was our best man when we married." In response to some folk singers from the Greenwich Village scene who detested the film's presentation of the Greenwich Village and the Llewyn Davis character, Chicago Reader writer Aimee Levitt notes that the film is purposely bleak because it is seen through the eyes of a depressed character. She writes, "Nobody gives a shit about his music. His singing partner has just committed suicide. He's alienated all his family and friends and has to hit up strangers to find a place to stay. The whole movie's told from his point of view, and there's nothing, even Pete Seeger leading a big old hootenanny in Washington Square Park, that's going to keep it from looking brown and sad, because that's what the world looks like when you're down in the depression hole."
