= Oscar Isaac =

American actor and musician (born 1979)

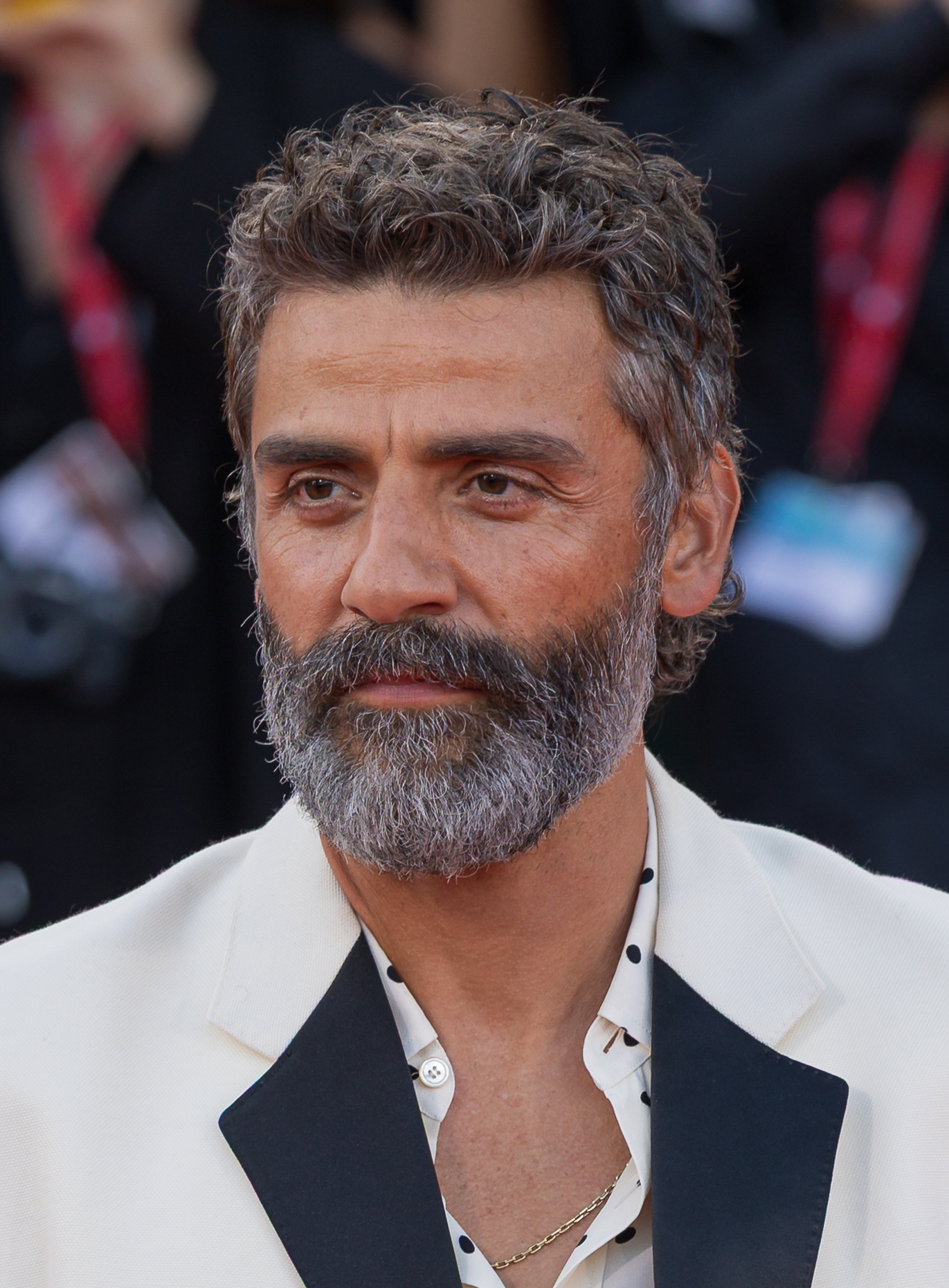
- Isaac in 2025
- Born: Óscar Isaac Hernández Estrada; March 9, 1979 (age 47); Guatemala City, Guatemala
- Citizenship: Guatemala; United States (since 2006)
- Education: Miami Dade College; Juilliard School (BFA)
- Occupation: Actor
- Years active: 1998–present
- Works: List of roles and awards
- Spouse: Elvira Lind (m. 2017)
- Children: 2
- Relatives: Nicole Hernandez Hammer (sister)

Óscar Isaac Hernández Estrada (born March 9, 1979) is an American actor. Recognized for his versatility, he has been credited with breaking stereotypes about Latino characters in Hollywood. He was named the best actor of his generation by Vanity Fair in 2017 and one of the 25 greatest actors of the 21st century by The New York Times in 2020. His accolades include a Golden Globe Award, a nomination for a Primetime Emmy Award and an honorary Doctor of Fine Arts degree from Juilliard. In 2016, he featured on Time's list of the 100 most influential people in the world.

Born in Guatemala, Isaac moved with his family to the United States as an infant. As a teenager, he joined a punk band, acted in plays and made his film debut in a minor role. A graduate of the Juilliard School, Isaac was a character actor in films for much of the 2000s. His first major role was that of Joseph in the biblical drama The Nativity Story (2006), and he won an AACTA Award for Best Actor in a Supporting Role for portraying political leader José Ramos-Horta in the Australian film Balibo (2009). After gaining recognition for playing supporting parts in Robin Hood (2010) and Drive (2011), Isaac had his breakthrough with the eponymous role of a singer in the musical drama Inside Llewyn Davis (2013), which earned him a Golden Globe nomination.

Isaac's career progressed with leading roles in the crime drama A Most Violent Year (2014), the thriller Ex Machina (2015) and the superhero film X-Men: Apocalypse (2016). He became a global star with the role of Poe Dameron in the Star Wars sequel trilogy (2015–2019). Isaac starred in the historical drama Operation Finale (2018)—which marked his first venture into production—the science fiction films Annihilation (2018), Dune (2021), and Frankenstein (2025), the crime drama The Card Counter (2021), and the animated superhero film Spider-Man: Across the Spider-Verse (2023).

On television, Isaac was the lead in three miniseries: Show Me a Hero (2015), in which his portrayal of Nick Wasicsko won him a Golden Globe Award, Scenes from a Marriage (2021), and the Marvel Cinematic Universe's Moon Knight (2022). In 2026, he also starred in the second season of the anthology series Beef. His stage work includes title roles in Romeo and Juliet (2007), Hamlet (2017) and The Sign in Sidney Brustein's Window (2023).

== Early life and education ==
Óscar Isaac Hernández Estrada was born on March 9, 1979, in Guatemala City to a Guatemalan mother, María Eugenia Estrada Nicolle, and a Cuban father, Óscar Gonzalo Hernández-Cano, a pulmonologist. He has an older sister, climate scientist Nicole, and a younger brother, journalist Mike. Isaac's family emigrated to the US when he was five months old, and they frequently moved around the country, living in Baltimore, New Orleans and Miami, where they eventually settled. Isaac became a United States citizen in 2006. He has French origins through his grandfather. He speaks English and Spanish.

Isaac attended the private grade school Westminster Christian School in southern Florida. Drawn to creating music and film content from a young age, he struggled growing up in Miami, which in his view was not "a flourishing place for the arts" due to its rather conservative nature. When he was four, he and his sister organized plays in their backyard. Around age 10, Isaac made a home movie called The Avenger, in which he played dual characters; he also participated in school plays. He wrote his first play in fifth grade; it was based on the Biblical story of Noah's Ark and featured a doubtful platypus. He found great joy at performing in front of people, which provided stress relief at a time when his parents were separating and his mother became sick.

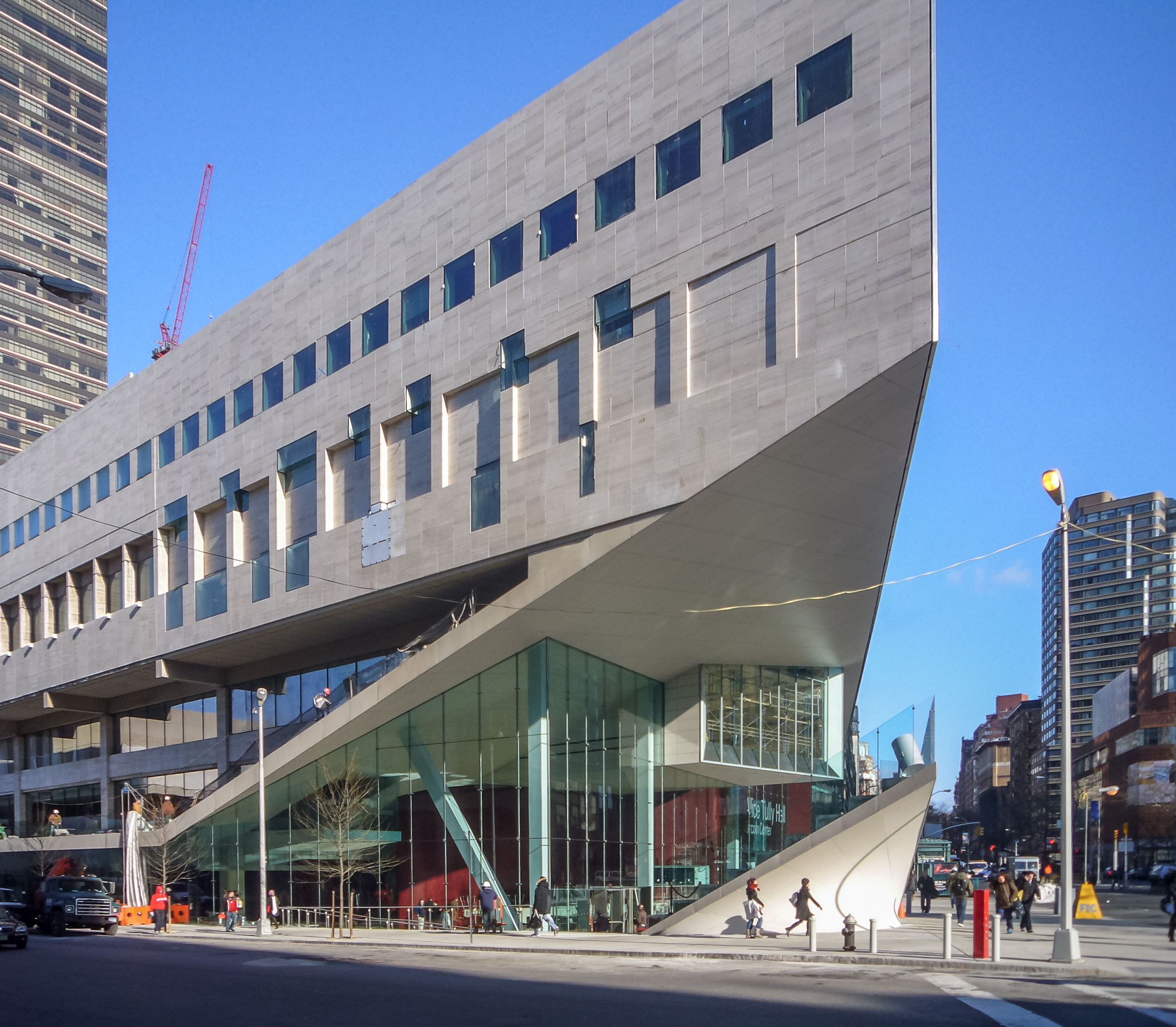
Isaac studied acting at the Juilliard School in New York City.

Growing up in a religious household, (Note: He described his upbringing as "very Christian".) Isaac was a rebellious child and liked causing trouble at school. He was eventually expelled.

In 1992, Hurricane Andrew destroyed his family's home in Miami. Around this time, his parents divorced and he moved with his mother to Palm Beach, where he attended a public high school. Isaac liked his new school and formed a band with boys he met in a trailer park. He learned music, played guitar and continued to make home movies, inspired by Quentin Tarantino's work: "action [films], with lots of blood and cars".

At age 14, Isaac and his bandmates performed Nirvana's "Rape Me" at a talent show and lost. He attended Santaluces Community High School and graduated in 1998. Isaac joined a Christian ska punk band named The Blinking Underdogs, which enjoyed some success, opening for Green Day. During this time, Isaac took a two-day workshop with a casting director and won a brief part in the independent film Illtown (1998).

A chance encounter with artistic director John Rodaz at the Area Stage Company in Miami Beach resulted in several roles on stage. Isaac next secured parts in Joseph Adler's 2000 productions of This Is Our Youth and Side Man at GableStage. To avoid getting typecast as a "Latino gangster", he used Isaac as his surname at auditions." To support himself financially, he worked as an orderly at the hospital where his father worked.

Isaac considered enlisting in the Marines at one point. His father initially disapproved of this, but Isaac had recruiters convince him. Once he had taken the exam, Isaac said he wanted to do combat photography in military reserve, a job they did not offer. Instead, he studied performing arts at Miami Dade College and continued to act in plays. During a trip to New York City to play a young Fidel Castro in an Off-Broadway production of the play When it's Cocktail Time in Cuba, he successfully auditioned to study at the Juilliard School. While a student there, he was cast in a production of Macbeth and worked on the film All About the Benjamins (2002). Isaac graduated from Juilliard with a Bachelor of Fine Arts degree in 2005.

== Career ==
=== Early roles (2005–2010) ===
After graduating from Juilliard, Isaac continued to write music and performed in small New York clubs, and played Proteus in Two Gentlemen of Verona (2005) in The Public Theater. The following year, he portrayed Federico García Lorca in New York City Center's production of Beauty of the Father; David Rooney of Variety remarked that his "injection of wry humor provides welcome levity". Also in 2006, he briefly appeared on the television series Law & Order: Criminal Intent, and played Joseph in the biblical epic The Nativity Story, opposite Keisha Castle-Hughes. It was the first film to hold its world premiere in the Vatican City. Having grown up in a religious family, Isaac believed it was important to portray his character "as human as possible" and approach him like any other role. To understand Joseph's background better, he read a book titled The Life and Times of Jesus the Messiah. The film received mixed reviews and grossed $46 million against a budget of $35 million. A critic for The Abbotsford News wrote that Isaac brought the role "a freshness and vulnerability it usually" lacks. Toddy Burton of The Austin Chronicle found Isaac "endearing", yet thought that his character's selfless personality made him seem unreal.

Isaac played Romeo alongside Lauren Ambrose in the Public Theater's Romeo and Juliet (2007). Michal Daniel of The Record believed that a "persuasively young and inexperienced" Isaac was overshadowed by Ambrose but had an enthusiastic speech and a passionate behavior. For much of the rest of the 2000s, Isaac played minor roles in films—the thriller The Life Before Her Eyes (2007), the biopic Che (2008), the spy thriller Body of Lies (2008) and the Spanish historical drama Agora (2009). In a book published by Rutgers University Press, which analyzes the performances of rising actors in the 2010s, Rick Warner believed that Isaac "momentarily steals the scene" as a United Nations interpreter in Che. Isaac won the AACTA Award for Best Actor in a Supporting Role for his role as José Ramos-Horta in Balibo (2009). Chris Barsanti of PopMatters opined that he played his role with "improbable charm". According to R. Kurt Osenlund of Slant Magazine, Isaac became "a bona fide scene-stealer" after Balibo.

Isaac began the 2010s with the role of the villainous King John in the film Robin Hood. In preparation, he read about the character and shared ideas with director Ridley Scott on how to portray him. He liked playing a villain, as he said one does not worry about having to make them likable, enabling him to display more facets of his character. The film had a mixed critical consensus and grossed $321 million against a budget of $200 million. For R. Kurt Osenlund, Isaac skillfully overshadowed Russell Crowe (who played Robin Hood), "bringing new, magnetic venom to the done-and-done-again role". Rick Warner wrote, "In his early minor film roles, Isaac makes the most of the few lines he is given, supplying emotional complexity not just verbally but also through his attractive face and piercing stare."

=== Breakthrough (2011–2014) ===
In 2011, Isaac received recognition for several supporting roles. His first role that year was of an asylum orderly in Zack Snyder's Sucker Punch, for which he applied extensive makeup. Isaac credited Snyder for his openness to actors' input on set. He played a security guard in Madonna's W.E. (2011), a critical failure that British Vogue saw as his "one misjudgment", although Drew Taylor of IndieWire believed he was "one of the few worthwhile aspects" of the film. Isaac then portrayed a musician in 10 Years, in which he performed his own song "Never Had", and an ex-convict in Nicolas Winding Refn's critically acclaimed action drama Drive (2011). Initially hesitant about Drive, he accepted the offer after working out a "more nuanced" and less stereotypical version of the character with Refn and screenwriter Hossein Amini. Todd McCarthy of The Hollywood Reporter praised Isaac's "unanticipated intelligence and sincerity"; Madison Diaz, writing for Comic Book Resources in 2022, called the film an early testament to Isaac's ability to create tension. Drive earned $81.3 million against a production budget of $15 million.

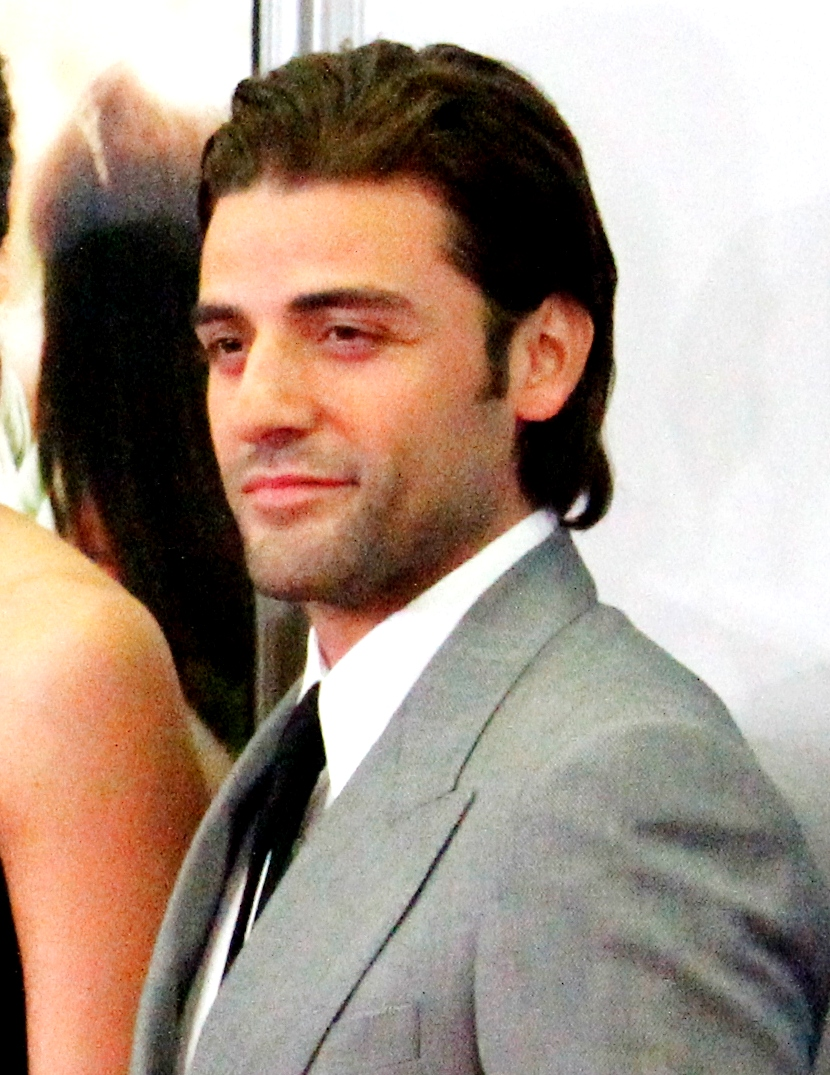
Isaac at the New York City premiere of Won't Back Down in 2013

Isaac had four film releases in 2012. His first, the Mexican epic historical drama For Greater Glory, had him play a freedom fighter, for which he was nominated for an ALMA Award for Favorite Movie Actor – Supporting Role. After playing the main character's cousin in the comedy-drama Revenge for Jolly!, Isaac appeared in the action thriller The Bourne Legacy. Director Tony Gilroy originally considered Isaac for the lead role in the latter, but the film's production company decided against casting an unknown actor. Isaac instead won the brief part of a brainwashed assassin. The film was released to a mixed critical reception and box-office success. Lizzie Logan of Vulture opined that "Isaac took a character with very little screen time and turned him into a living, breathing, hurting person". Won't Back Down, a drama on the American educational system, was Isaac's last film in 2012. It received negative reviews and was a box-office failure.

In 2013, Isaac played the titular character of a struggling folk singer in 1961 Greenwich Village in the Coen brothers' drama Inside Llewyn Davis. Isaac accepted the project due to his high regard for the Coen brothers, who in turn were impressed with his musical talent. In preparation for the part, Isaac learned the guitar technique Travis picking and worked with musicians Erik Frandsen and T Bone Burnett. Before production began, Isaac behaved and dressed like Davis to observe people's reaction to him. The film received acclaim, as did Isaac's performance in what proved to be his breakthrough role. Critics from The Oregonian and St. Louis Post-Dispatch added that Isaac "anchors this film with a star-making, soulful performance", and "has a gift for being appealing even when he's unpleasant". A. O. Scott of The New York Times wrote, "Isaac, a versatile character actor here ascending to the highest levels of his craft, refuses the easy road of charm. Like his character, he trusts his own professionalism and the integrity of the material." Scott opined that the musical performances elevated the film, especially Isaac's "The Death of Queen Jane" and "The Shoals of Herring". For the film, Isaac was nominated for the Golden Globe Award for Best Actor – Motion Picture Musical or Comedy. He next starred as Laurent LeClaire, a man who seduces his friend's wife (Elizabeth Olsen) in the erotic thriller In Secret (2013). Michael Phillips of the Chicago Tribune praised Isaac as the film's prime asset, noting that his "sly delineation of the charismatic Laurent provides the through-line".

In 2014, Isaac appeared in the thriller The Two Faces of January, starring alongside Viggo Mortensen and Kirsten Dunst. He starred with Jessica Chastain in J. C. Chandor's A Most Violent Year (2014), replacing actor Javier Bardem. Described by Isaac as "a gangster movie without the gangsters", the film follows his character Abel Morales, the ambitious owner of a heating-oil company, who is determined to protect his business in a city plagued by violent crime. Chandor first met Isaac upon Chastain's insistence and, finding him "precise, wild and alive", cast him in the part. When Isaac noticed that Morales's background was missing in the script, Chandor allowed him to create it, for which he researched Latin Americans' history in the 1950s and 1960s. Fascinated by Morales's duality—"cold, calculating businessman" but also "highly emotional and highly passionate"—Isaac read books about sociopaths and "corporate America" to prepare for the part. The film failed to recoup its budget but was a critical success. Ann Hornaday of The Washington Post praised Isaac for "deliver[ing] a master class in that skill from the very first moment of A Most Violent Year to the last", adding, "he's a commanding screen presence, even when he's saying nothing." Tad Friend of The New Yorker believed that Isaac's portrayal was reminiscent of the work of actors Treat Williams, Dustin Hoffman and Al Pacino. For his performance in the film, Isaac won a National Board of Review Award for Best Actor.

=== Mainstream success (2015–2017) ===
In 2015, Isaac portrayed Nathan Hamlet Bateman, the reclusive inventor of a humanoid artificial intelligence, in the science fiction film Ex Machina. He based his character's look and accent on director Stanley Kubrick and observed his speech patterns. Isaac modeled Bateman's personality on chess champion Bobby Fischer and played the game during filming to get "in that mode of constantly trying to be a few steps ahead". Ex Machina was a commercial and critical success, with praise for Isaac's performance. Matt Zoller Seitz of RogerEbert.com commended Isaac for possessing "an electrifying star quality, cruelly sneering yet somehow delightful, insinuating and intellectually credible". Isaac followed with his first leading role on television—the 6-episode HBO miniseries Show Me a Hero, in which he played politician Nick Wasicsko. Isaac was approached for the role shortly after he had finished filming for Star Wars: The Force Awakens. Although he found the story "fascinating", he was initially reluctant to sign on as it was "a little impenetrable" for him. He agreed after finding footage of Wasicsko interacting with the media. Because a show's length generally exceeds a film's, Isaac found filming the miniseries a little more difficult and was skeptical about its six-hour format. Isaac's performance, which won him the Golden Globe Award for Best Actor – Miniseries or Television Film, was lauded by critics. Emily Nussbaum of The New Yorker praised it as "a star performance agile enough to elevate scenes that might veer into agitprop".

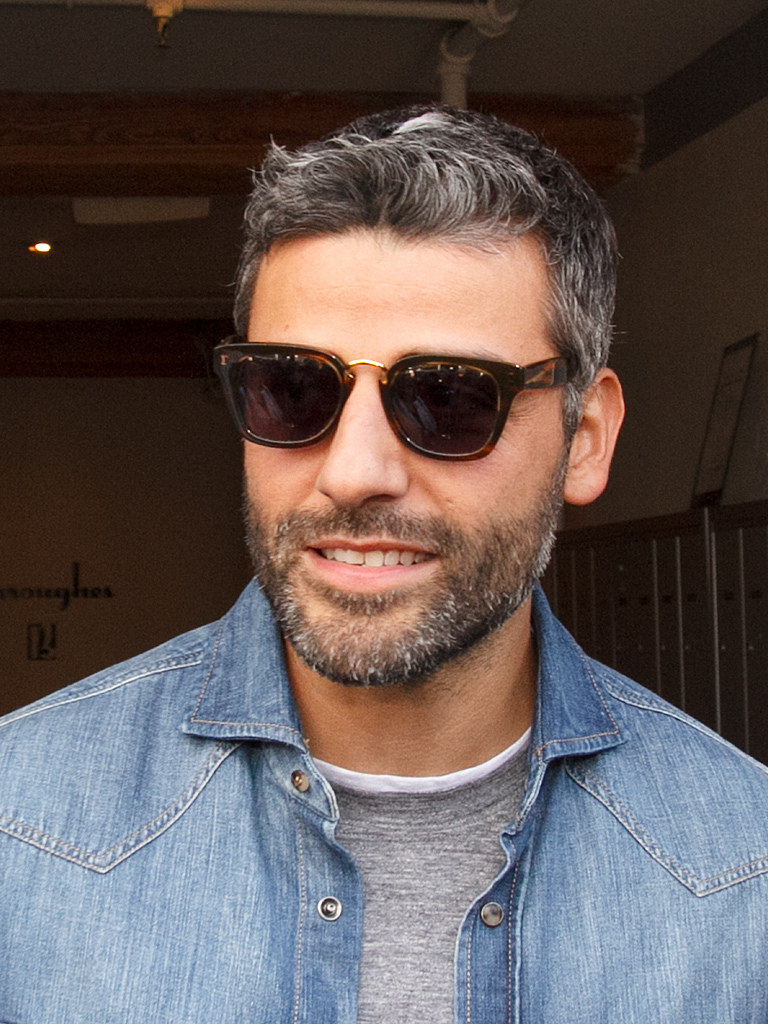
Isaac at the 2016 Toronto International Film Festival, where his film The Promise premiered

Isaac co-starred as Poe Dameron, an X-wing pilot, in the epic space opera film Star Wars: The Force Awakens (2015). Having liked Star Wars films since childhood, he initially considered himself unfit for the part, (Note: Isaac doubted if his performance would make the character interesting.) but director J. J. Abrams convinced him in a meeting. A fan of Inside Llewyn Davis, Abrams described Isaac as "a far more sophisticated actor than one might get for a role". Isaac suggested to Abrams that his character be from the moon Yavin 4, which first appeared in Star Wars (1977) in scenes filmed in his country Guatemala; this idea was incorporated. While filming The Force Awakens, Isaac initially felt insecure, but soon found a sense of belonging with co-stars Daisy Ridley and John Boyega, who were also newcomers to the film series. In preparation for the role, Isaac read about war, including a book called What It's Like to Go to War. The Force Awakens received positive reviews and grossed $2 billion worldwide, becoming the highest-grossing film of 2015. Forbes and TheWrap critics praised the cast additions, including Isaac, as "outright terrific", and "engaging performers" who "make strong impressions very quickly, and who are charismatic enough to make us care about their characters".

Isaac agreed to play the titular villain in the film X-Men: Apocalypse (2016) because he was a fan of X-Men comic books since childhood. He underwent extensive makeup and prosthetics, and wore a 40-pound suit; the full costume was uncomfortable, which forced Isaac to go to a cooling tent between takes. Critics Angelica Jade Bastién and Glenn Kenny believed Isaac, though a "charismatic and dynamic" actor, "feel[s] so torpid here", and "fares poorly through no fault of his own". Years after Apocalypse's underwhelming critical performance, Isaac commented that he wished the film and his character had been better handled. Also in 2016, he starred alongside Charlotte Le Bon and Christian Bale in The Promise, a historical drama about a love triangle set during the Armenian genocide. Critics were dismissive of the film, believing that the outstanding cast and powerful real-life story was wasted on a love triangle that failed to engage. Richard Roeper of the Chicago Sun-Times wrote that the film was "derivative of better war romances" but was "bolstered by strong performances from Isaac and Bale, two of the best actors of their generation". The film's producers intended to donate the profits to charity, but it accrued a $102 million loss. Outside film in 2016, Isaac narrated the Nike ad Unlimited You, and voiced a soldier trying to rejoin civilian life in the podcast series Homecoming.

About late 2016, Isaac spent most of his time caring for his dying mother. As her condition worsened, he began reading her Hamlet by Shakespeare, whose work he had been a fan of since childhood. In honor of his mother, who died later in February 2017, Isaac starred as Prince Hamlet in The Public Theater production of Hamlet. The play, directed by Sam Gold, ran from July to September 2017. The Hollywood Reporter's David Rooney praised Isaac as the production's prime asset, and Jeremy Gerard of Deadline Hollywood described him as "the rare actor as comfortable onstage as before the camera", highlighting his "committed, fully conceived performance". Also that year, Isaac played an insurance investigator in the black comedy Suburbicon, written by the Coen brothers who directed Isaac in Inside Llewyn Davis. Peter Travers of Rolling Stone called Isaac's performance the film's best, and David Sims of The Atlantic wrote, "The film's only really electrifying moments are generated by Oscar Isaac [...] it's in his scenes that the darkly funny spark of the Coens' writing flickers to life." For the film, Isaac was nominated for a San Diego Film Critics Society Award for Best Supporting Actor. Isaac's final work in 2017 was in the sequel Star Wars: The Last Jedi, in which he reprised the role of Poe Dameron. J. J. Abrams originally intended to kill Dameron off in The Force Awakens, but Isaac convinced him otherwise. The Last Jedi grossed $1.3 billion becoming 2017's highest-grossing film.

=== Professional expansion (2018–present) ===
Isaac filmed Annihilation (2018) simultaneously with Star Wars: The Last Jedi at the same studio. As such, he did not have enough time rehearsing for his role in the former and credited co-star Natalie Portman (who played his wife) with helping him film their intimate scenes with ease. The film received positive reviews. Tasha Robinson of The Verge complimented Isaac's chemistry with Portman, and Caryn James of the BBC took note of his ability to act well with a mere glance. Isaac debuted as a producer filming the historical drama Operation Finale (2018), in which he played Peter Malkin, the Israeli secret agent who captured Nazi fugitive Adolf Eichmann in 1960. When asked about his first time producing, he said he wanted to contribute to the stories he is part of. He believed that the film's topic still remains relevant in modern times, where extreme views are deemed acceptable. Critical consensus for Operation Finale was that it is "well-intentioned, well-acted, and overall entertaining, even if the depth and complexity of the real-life events depicted can get a little lost in their dramatization". Bhaskar Chattopadhyay of Firstpost thought Isaac was brilliant in certain scenes, but mainly highlighted the performances of the supporting actors. The film was a commercial failure. Isaac's other films in 2018 include At Eternity's Gate (where he played Paul Gauguin), Life Itself and Spider-Man: Into the Spider-Verse, which featured his voice during the post-credits. Isaac co-starred with Olivia Wilde in the box-office failure Life Itself; Caroline Siede of Consequence found the two leads unconvincing and their roles to be poorly written.

After Isaac finished filming Star Wars: The Rise of Skywalker in October 2018, he intended to take a prolonged acting hiatus but was cast as Duke Leto Atreides in Dune (2021) a few months later. In the former, the final film in the Star Wars sequel trilogy, Isaac reprised the role of Poe Dameron. It received mixed reviews but was profitable. Earlier in 2019, Isaac starred as an agent working against a drug cartel in South America in J. C. Chandor's Netflix film Triple Frontier. To avoid feeling exhausted during scenes in which he is running at high altitude, Isaac trained in a New York hall where one can decrease oxygen. He said that filming in a favela with no water or sewer made him realize his privileged life. Reviews for the film were generally positive. Critics Christy Lemire and Richard Roeper highlighted Isaac's screen presence as "charismatic" and "electric". Isaac next voiced the role of Gomez Addams in The Addams Family (2019), an animated film based on the titular characters created by Charles Addams. For years, fans suggested Isaac be cast in the part as they claimed he resembled Raul Julia who played Gomez Addams in live-action films in the 1990s. The Addams Family received mixed reviews and grossed $203 million on a $24 million budget.

Isaac's only role in 2020 was of a kindhearted prison officer in the short film The Letter Room, for which he was also an executive producer. Roktim Rajpal of the Deccan Herald believed that Isaac "is the backbone of the short and makes an impact with his sincere performance", yet he fails to "internali[z]e the character as much as expected". The following year, he starred alongside Jessica Chastain in Scenes from a Marriage. A remake of the 1973 Swedish series of the same name by Ingmar Bergman, it switches gender roles, and explores the themes of monogamy, marriage and divorce. To film the show, Isaac and Chastain employed their experiences from past relationships and parents' marriage. Isaac performed in a full frontal nude scene in the series. Reviews for the show were positive, particularly for the duo's chemistry. Carol Midgley of The Times praised them for giving "masterclass performances and delivering crackling, wounding dialogue faultlessly". He was nominated for the Golden Globe Award, Screen Actors Guild Award and Primetime Emmy Award for Best Actor in a miniseries.

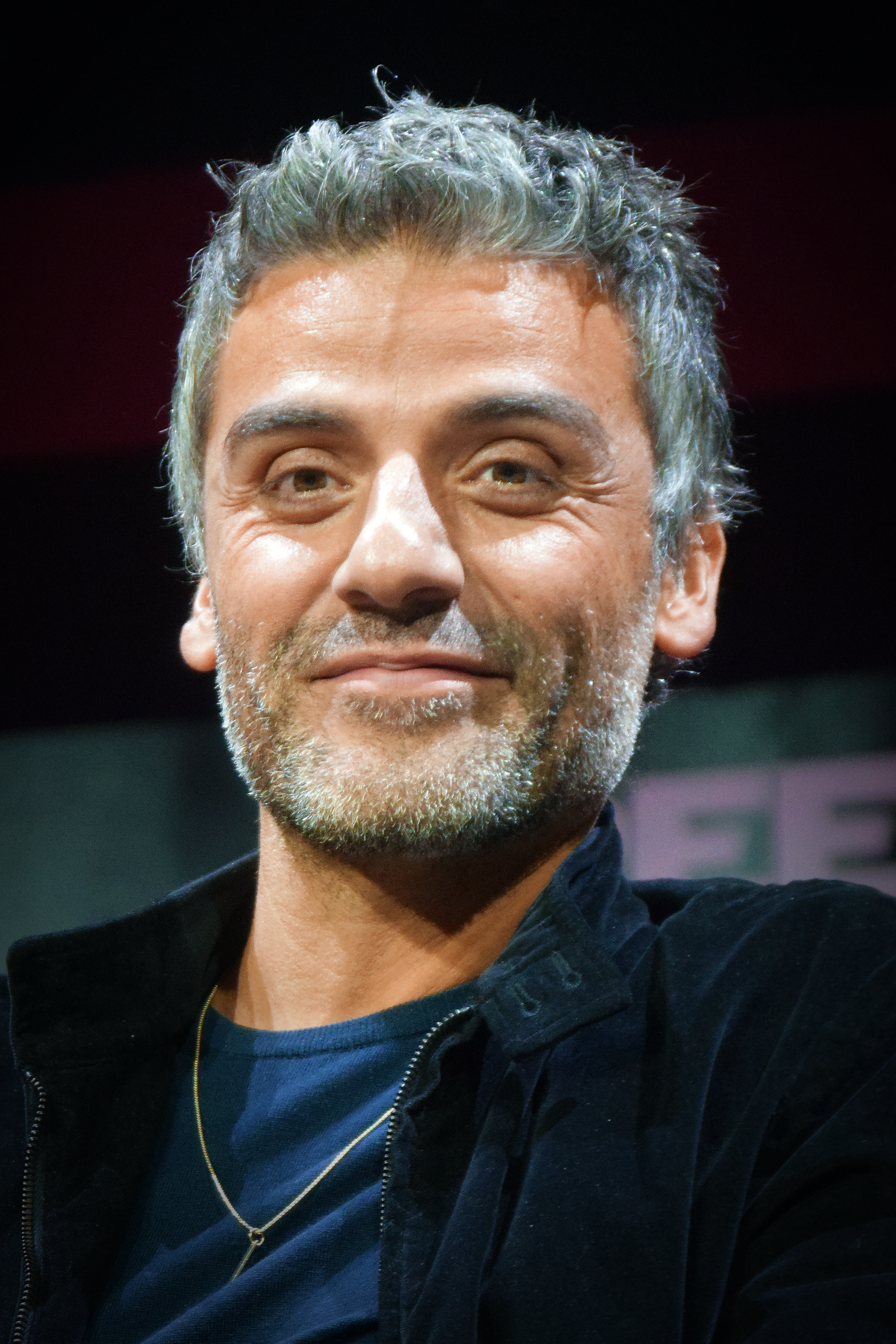
Isaac at the 2022 New York Comic Con

To avoid what he saw as "green screen alien space land", Isaac starred as William Tell—a troubled, gambling military veteran—in the Paul Schrader-directed crime drama The Card Counter. Because his character writes in his journal every night, Isaac took a penmanship course. To portray Tell's military experience, he drew inspiration from his time as a high-school graduate when he and his friend wanted to join the marines. Near the end, the film's production was halted due to the COVID-19 lockdown; per Isaac's suggestion, he finished it with only Schrader and the cinematographer on set. Critics praised The Card Counter and Isaac's performance, which for Eric Kohn of IndieWire was his career's best. Justin Chang of NPR lauded Isaac for "bring[ing] his usual sly, soulful magnetism to the role" and embodying his character's trauma in his "dark, haunted gaze". The film earned him a nomination for the London Film Critics' Circle Award for Actor of the Year. After reprising the role of Gomez Addams in The Addams Family 2, Isaac starred in Dune as the father of the protagonist Paul Atreides (played by Timothée Chalamet). Based on the 1965 namesake novel by Frank Herbert, Dune premiered at the 78th Venice International Film Festival to mixed reviews but was nominated for 10 Academy Awards. It earned over $400 million against a budget of $165 million.

Isaac began 2022 with the black comedy Big Gold Brick in a brief role that Nick Schager of Variety found "out of left field". In the Marvel Cinematic Universe series Moon Knight (2022), he played the titular superhero, a man with dissociative identity disorder (DID) who serves as an avatar to the Egyptian moon god Khonshu. (Note: Isaac played Marc Spector / Moon Knight, Steven Grant / Mr. Knight, and Jake Lockley.) He also executive produced the show, which is based on Marvel Comics' namesake comic book. Initially reluctant to join another franchise, he had several conversations with Marvel Studios president Kevin Feige before signing on. Drawn to his character's complex mind, Isaac found manifesting each alter a technical challenge that took considerable energy. He read Robert B. Oxnam's book A Fractured Mind to research DID. To distinguish the three alters, Isaac gave them different nationalities. For example, he suggested that the alter Steven Grant be English, and was inspired by comedians Karl Pilkington (from the British travel comedy series An Idiot Abroad) and Peter Sellers to develop his English accent. The third alter, Jake Lockley, speaks Spanish as Isaac wanted to add an aspect of his own life to the role. Moon Knight was released to a positive critical reception. In a review of the fifth episode, Matt Fowler of IGN took note of Isaac's "dynamic and dazzling performance" and "ace acting", highlighting the dramatic scene in which his character revisits his traumatic past. He was nominated for an MTV Movie Award for Best Hero. Isaac also dropped out of starring in the Francis Ford Coppola film Megalopolis.

In 2023, Isaac starred as the title character in the revival of Lorraine Hansberry's The Sign in Sidney Brustein's Window opposite Rachel Brosnahan. The production had its initial run at the Brooklyn Academy of Music before its Broadway transfer which began in April 2023. Later that year, he voiced the role of Spider-Man 2099, a version of the namesake superhero, in the animated film Spider-Man: Across the Spider-Verse. The film received critical acclaim and was a commercial success. Critic Maya Phillips of The New York Times found Isaac to be well-cast as a slightly unhinged and self-serious Spider-Man.

In 2025, Isaac voiced Jesus Christ in the Angel Studios film The King of Kings. Isaac then starred in Julian Schnabel's drama In the Hand of Dante, based on the novel of the same name by Nick Tosches. He ended the year portraying the lead role of Victor Frankenstein in Guillermo del Toro's horror film Frankenstein. About his experience filming it, Isaac declared: "It was the most fucking fun I've ever had in my life. Running around in the rain, up and down steps, this Christ-like thing on a crucifix and Guillermo in the corner, screaming! It was hard to fathom that it was actually happening. It's such dark material, but was approached with so much joy. Like 14 year olds had keys to the kingdom – it had that kind of energy to it." During this time, Isaac dropped out of lead roles in the films Behemoth!, Kockroach, and Flesh of the Gods.

Isaac was the subject and executive producer of the 2025 documentary film King Hamlet, shot in 2017 and directed by his spouse Elvira Lind, that focused on his actor's preparations for The Public Theater production of Hamlet.

Isaac also had a starring role as Joshua Martin in the second season of Beef, created by Lee Sung Jin, released on April 16, 2026, on Netflix.

On May 22, 2026, Isaac received an honorary Doctor of Fine Arts degree from his alma mater Juilliard.

==== Upcoming ====
In 2027, Isaac will reprise his voice role as Miguel O'Hara in Spider-Man: Beyond the Spider-Verse.

== Reception and acting style ==
Media publications like Vanity Fair, The Guardian and People have positively commented on Isaac's looks. Rolling Stone and other media outlets have dubbed Isaac "the Internet's Boyfriend", a label he is skeptical about. Hoby Hermione of The Guardian took note of Isaac's "cheerful, vigorous presence", "energy and good humour". Melanie Haupt of The Austin Chronicle identified him as "polite, professional, serene". Joseph Adler, who directed Isaac in plays early in his career, was impressed with his "discipline", "professionalism" and "incredible intelligence". Nick Levine of NME wrote, "In the flesh, Oscar Isaac has a relaxed charisma that puts you at ease." Brett Martin of GQ commented on his "wide, easy smile", adding, "It's been a long time since we've had a leading man whose charisma comes packed with such tetchiness, so little naked desire to be liked."

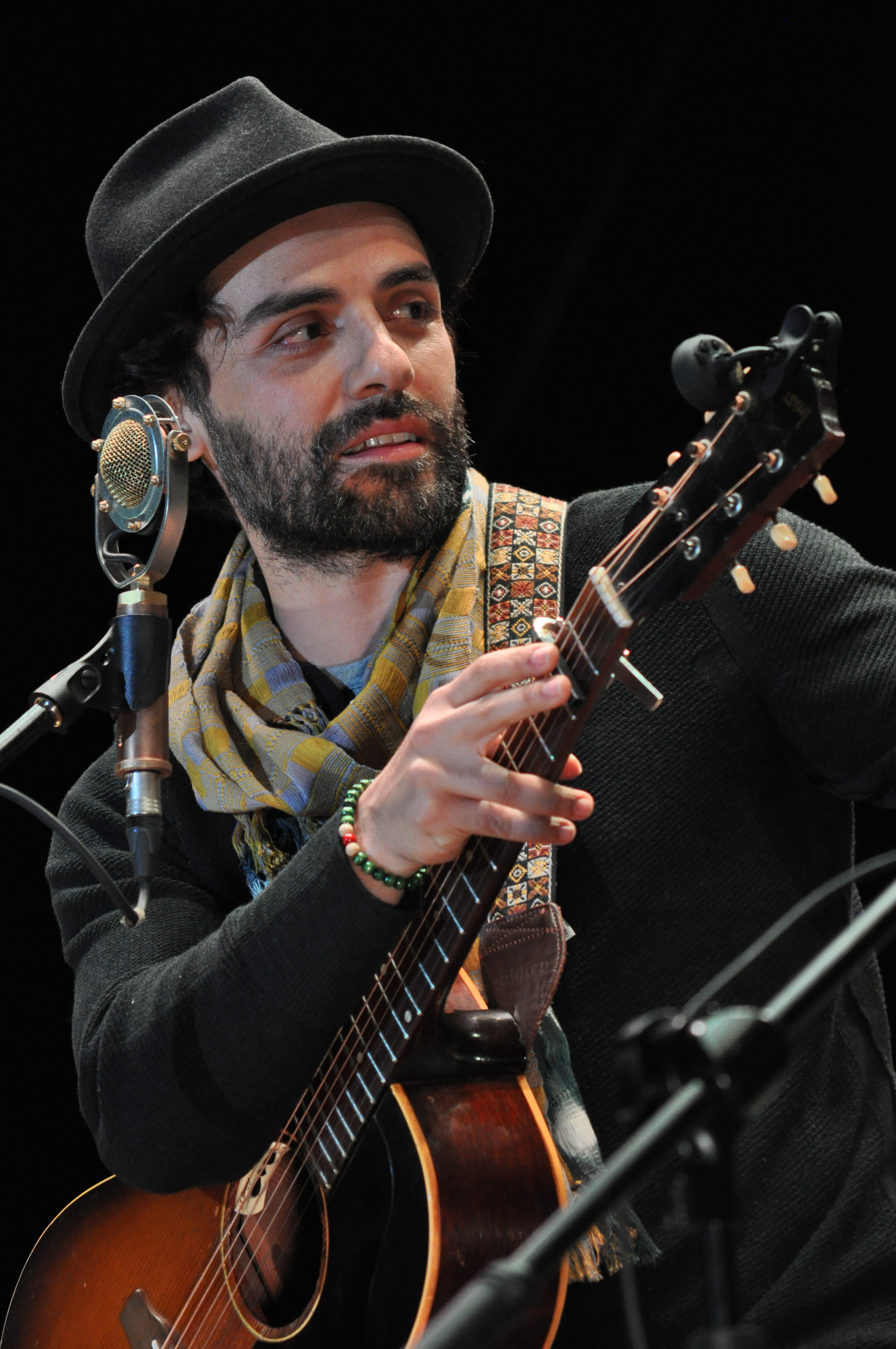
Isaac playing guitar with Gaby Moreno during a concert in 2015

In 2016, Time named Isaac one of the 100 most influential people in the world. In 2017, Isaac was described as the "best dang actor of his generation" by Vanity Fair's chief critic Richard Lawson, who wrote, "He's a classically trained actor of true range, one who can sing and dance, do comedy, action, and drama with equal ease and authority. He's thrilling to watch, a prodigious mind sparking a nimble [...] form into action." The same year, Esquire's Miranda Collinge added that after his roles of Hamlet and Poe Dameron, Isaac was becoming the most accomplished leading actor of his generation. In 2020, The New York Times ranked him 14th in its list of the 25 Greatest Actors of the 21st Century. "When I think about what makes him so credible as an actor", wrote the list's co-author A. O. Scott, "[is] whatever Isaac is pretending to do onscreen [...] I always believe that he really knows how to do it, and that I'm watching some kind of authentic mastery in action." Hossein Amini, who directed Isaac in The Two Faces of January, remarked on his "ability to make the tiniest shifts in character incredibly quickly, without revealing any element of process".

Martin identified an extent of "loneliness and menace" in Isaac's most memorable characters, attributing his growing success to "a series of brilliant but darkly idiosyncratic roles" (Inside Llewyn Davis and A Most Violent Year). Isaac himself noted "a sense of melancholy, anger, displacement" in these characters. For Rick Warner, Isaac's roles in these films and Ex Machina signify his "penchant for moody rumination" that "runs together with an expression of intellect that slips into egoism". Madison Diaz of Comic Book Resources praised Isaac for his inclination to "intense and complex" characters and for exploring their hardships and complicated pasts. Tom Shone of The Guardian identified common characters of "ambitious, slightly myopic men whose own movement quickens their fall" (an oil importer struggling to keep his business intact in A Most Violent Year and a doomed politician in Show Me a Hero). Shone noted, "He has made a career playing men for whom careerism doesn't work." Isaac's favorite roles depict "a lot more of the beauty and cruelty of life". He often looks for "the comic in the dramatic and the dramatic in the comic and where those things meet and the brackish waters in between". For Isaac, acting is "the only framework where you can give expression to such intense emotions. Otherwise anywhere else is pretty inappropriate, unless you're just in a room screaming to yourself."

Throughout his career, Isaac has avoided typecasting. Often noted for his versatility, he has played a wide range of nationalities, including Egyptian, Indonesian, Armenian, Greek, Welsh, East Timorese, and English. Rick Warner opined Isaac has "skillfully embodied several different affective dispositions—sensitive, flippant, romantically charming, hyperintelligent, neurotic, cynical, sinister, and menacingly violent". He has been credited for a positive ethnic representation in American cinema. Author Charles Ramírez Berg wrote in Close-up: Great Cinematic Performances that Isaac's character in A Most Violent Year—a self-acting businessman replacing the usual "barbarous, short-fused ethnic gangster"—broke "the tempestuous, hot-blooded Latino stereotype". Isaac is one of the few Latino actors to play Hamlet in a major US production, alongside José Ferrer (opposite Paul Robeson) in the 1930s-40s, Martin Sheen (who is half-Spanish) who played the role in 1968 at The Public, and Frankie J. Alvarez in 2012 at Asolo Repertory. Isaac believes that "the artist [...] should be borderless". If his character is Latino, he "take[s] that away and see[s] what's there. People will put that on top of a bland character to make them exotic, to add a little spice."

== Personal life ==
Isaac is indifferent to his celebrity status and remains close with his family. According to a New York Daily News report, he was engaged to Maria Miranda in 2007. Isaac is married to Danish film director Elvira Lind, whom he met in 2012, and married in 2017. They have two sons: Eugene (b. 2017) and Mads (b. 2019). He lives in Williamsburg, Brooklyn.

Isaac is close friends with actor Pedro Pascal, whom he met while both actors starred in a 2005 Off-Broadway production of Beauty of a Father. Isaac and Pascal would later star together in the 2019 film Triple Frontier.

Isaac expressed support for Armenia in 2020 during the second Nagorno-Karabakh conflict, saying, "To think that Armenian people are in jeopardy once again is heartbreaking." He also expressed solidarity with the people of the Gaza Strip during the Gaza war. As part of a group called Artists4Ceasefire, he signed a letter urging President Joe Biden to call for an immediate ceasefire in Gaza.
