= King Hamlet (film) =

2025 documentary film by Elvira Lind

- Promotional poster
- Directed by: Elvira Lind
- Produced by: Sara Stockmann; Sofia Sondervan
- Starring: Oscar Isaac
- Edited by: Adam Nielsen
- Production companies: Dutch Tilt Film; Mad Gene Productions; Sontagg Pictures
- Distributed by: Mubi
- Release date: 2025
- Countries: United States; Denmark
- Language: English

King Hamlet is a 2025 documentary directed by Elvira Lind. The film was shot in 2017 and follows actor and Lind's husband, Oscar Isaac, as he prepared for the Public Theatre's production of William Shakespeare's Hamlet directed by Sam Gold. Whilst preparing for the production, Isaac dealt both with the loss of his mother and the birth of his first child. The film was produced by Sara Stockmann and Sofia Sondervan and executive produced by Lind, Isaac, Gena Konstantinakos, Sam Gold, Ethan Hawke, Ryan Hawke and Adam Nielsen.

The film premiered at the 2025 Telluride Film Festival. The film was made available to stream on Letterboxd Video Store from July 1, 2026, to July 31, 2026, as part of its "Unreleased Gems" label.
