= The Letter Room =

2020 live-action short film

- Promotional poster
- Directed by: Elvira Lind
- Screenplay by: Elvira Lind
- Produced by: Sofia Sondervan
- Starring: Oscar Isaac; Alia Shawkat; Brian Petsos; Tony Gillan; Michael Hernandez; Eileen Galindo; John Douglas Thompson
- Cinematography: Sam Chase
- Edited by: Adam Nielsen
- Music by: Paulo Stagnaro
- Production companies: Dutch Tilt Film; Mad Gene Productions; Goldcrest Post; Inspire Entertainment; Topic
- Distributed by: Topic (U.S.); Salaud Morisset (international)
- Release date: November 9, 2020 (HollyShorts Film Festival)
- Running time: 30 minutes
- Country: United States
- Language: English
- Box office: $443,050 (all short films)

The Letter Room is a 2020 American short comedy-drama film directed by Elvira Lind. In November 2020, it premiered at HollyShorts Film Festival. It was also nominated for Best Short Film at Tribeca Film Festival and the Palm Springs International ShortFest.

The Letter Room was produced by Sofia Sondervan and executive produced by Oscar Isaac, Elvira Lind, Jason Spire, Ryan Chanatry and Gena Konstantinakos.

== Plot ==
When a kind-hearted prison officer is transferred to the letter room, he soon gets involved in an inmate's personal affairs. At last, Richard, a solitary and compassionate corrections officer with a heart of gold, has been promoted to Director of Prisoner Communications. As Richard quickly gets the hang of his new job as master of the letter room, scanning all the incoming and outgoing correspondence of the inmates for contraband, his lonely life becomes irrevocably complicated when he gets too involved in the private life of a death row inmate.

== Cast ==
- Oscar Isaac as Richard
- Alia Shawkat as Rosita
- Brian Petsos as Cris
- Tony Gillan as Don
- Michael Hernandez
- Eileen Galindo as Irene
- John Douglas Thompson as Jackson
- Kenneth Heaton as Ray
- Larry Smith as Happy Birthday Singer
- Guillermo Estrada as TV Personality
- William Merrell as Inmate

== Awards ==
Since its launch, the film has been selected in various festivals around the United States. In February 2021, it made the Live Action Short Film shortlist for the 93rd Academy Awards, and, in March 2021, it was nominated for the Academy Award for Best Live Action Short Film.

Year	Award	Category	Result
2020	HollyShorts Film Festival	Official Selection	Nominated
2020	Tribeca Film Festival	Best Short Film	Nominated
2020	Palm Springs International ShortFest	Best Short Film	Nominated
2021	Academy Awards	Best Live Action Short	Nominated
2021	Elba Film Festival	Best Short Film	Won
2021	UK Film Festival	Best Actor	Won
2022	Fargo Film Festival	Best Film	Won
