= Joshua Blum =

American media producer

- Occupations: Producer (film, television, theater, commercial)
- Known for: Washington Square Films

Joshua Blum is an American film, television, commercial, and theater producer based in New York City. He established Washington Square Films (WSF), a production and management company based in New York and Los Angeles, in 1995.

== Career ==
At Washington Square Films, Blum created and produced the company's debut project, The United States of Poetry (USOP), a five-part series for PBS, together with Bob Holman. The United States of Poetry was directed by Mark Pellington. The program featured 60 poets performing in stylized poetry videos.

Joshua Blum has served as Producer or Executive Producer for Steven Soderbergh, Abel Ferrara,Sally Potter, and Pedro Almodóvar. Blum has also produced the early work of J. C. Chandor, Kelly Reichardt, and Alex Ross Perry.

In 2023, Washington Square Films produced a live musical based on the 1972 Jamaican film The Harder They Come, with music by Jimmy Cliff and a book and additional songs by Suzan-Lori Parks. The musical was developed by Blum together with Bruce Miller. It was first performed at The Public Theater in New York and received nominations for nine Off-Broadway Awards. The musical also received the Outer Critics Award for Outstanding New Off-Broadway Musical.

== Filmography ==
Joshua Blum filmography
| Year | Title | Director | Credit |
|---|---|---|---|
| 1995 | United States of Poetry | Mark Pellington | Producer |
| 2006 | Old Joy | Kelly Reichardt | Executive Producer |
| 2007 | Adrift in Manhattan | Alfredo Rodriguez de Villa | Producer |
| 2008 | Wendy and Lucy | Kelly Reichardt | Executive Producer |
| 2010 | And Everything Is Going Fine | Steven Soderbergh | Producer |
| 2011 | Margin Call | J. C. Chandor | Executive Producer |
| 2012 | Francine | Brian M. Cassidy, Melanie Shatzky | Producer |
| 2013 | All Is Lost | J. C. Chandor | Executive Producer |
| 2014 | A Most Violent Year | J. C. Chandor | Executive Producer |
| 2014 | Listen Up Philip | Alex Ross Perry | Producer |
| 2016 | My Entire High School Sinking Into the Sea | Dash Shaw | Executive Producer |
| 2017 | Crown Heights | Matt Ruskin | Executive Producer |
| 2017 | Golden Exits | Alex Ross Perry | Producer |
| 2017 | Permanent | Colette Burson | Producer |
| 2017 | Thirst Street | Nathan Silver | Producer |
| 2017 | 11:55 | Ari Issler, Ben Snyder | Producer |
| 2018 | Most Likely to Murder | Dan Gregor | Executive Producer |
| 2019 | Colewell | Tom Quinn | Producer |
| 2019 | Flower Punk | Alison Klayman | Executive Producer |
| 2019 | The Projectionist | Abel Ferrara | Producer |
| 2019 | The Sound of Silence | Michael Tyburski | Executive Producer |
| 2019 | Tommaso | Abel Ferrara | Executive Producer |
| 2020 | Save Yourselves! | Alex Huston Fischer, Eleanor Wilson | Executive Producer |
| 2020 | The Roads Not Taken | Sally Potter | Executive Producer |
| 2021 | Cryptozoo | Dash Shaw | Executive Producer |
| 2022 | Allswell in New York | Ben Snyder | Executive Producer |
| 2024 | Between the Temples | Nathan Silver | Executive Producer |
| 2024 | The Room Next Door | Pedro Almodóvar | NYC Executive Producer |
| 2024 | The Dutchman | Andre Gaines | Executive Producer |
| 2026 | Here I'm Alive | Joshua Z Weinstein | Executive Producer |
