= Washington Square Films =

American production and management company

- Type: Private
- Industry: Films; Theater
- Founded: 1995
- Founder: Joshua Blum
- Headquarters: New York City, New York, United States
- Key people: Joshua Blum (CEO)
- Total assets: ▲$232M (2011)
- Owner: Joshua Blum
- Website: wsfilms.com

Washington Square Films (WSF) is an American production and management company based in New York City and Los Angeles. It was founded in 1995 by Joshua Blum.

== History ==
The company's debut project was United States of Poetry, a five-part series for PBS, created and produced by Joshua Blum and Bob Holman and directed by Mark Pellington. The program featured sixty poets performing in stylized poetry videos, including Paul Beatty, Joseph Brodsky, Jimmy Carter, Sandra Cisneros, Leonard Cohen, Rita Dove, Allen Ginsberg, Czesław Miłosz, Lou Reed, Johnny Depp, and Amiri Baraka. The series was accompanied by a book of the same name published by Abrams Books and a soundtrack album from Mercury Records.

The USOP also produced a live touring component, which was booked and managed by Kathleen Russo and Mary Shimkin. In 1996, Russo and Shimkin joined Washington Square Films to book and manage performers and spoken word acts, naming the division Washington Square Arts. The roster included Spalding Gray, Eric Bogosian, Danny Hoch, David Sedaris, Sandra Bernhard, and many others. The company discontinued booking from its host of services in 2010. In 1998, manager Katherine Atkinson joined the division and built a roster of then unknown talent including Kerry Washington, Dulé Hill, Sarita Choudhury, Victor Rasuk, Adepero Oduye, Alex Désert, and others, all who are still represented by Atkinson and Washington Square Films.

== Films and theater ==
Washington Square Films has worked with and produced films for Steven Soderbergh, Abel Ferrara, and Sally Potter. The company is perhaps best known for supporting and producing the early work of filmmakers including J. C. Chandor, Kelly Reichardt, Alex Ross Perry, and others. The company's projects have been nominated for two Academy Awards, two Emmy Awards (winning one), sixteen Independent Spirit Awards (winning three), three Golden Globes (winning one), and one Peabody Award (won). The company has had fourteen films premiere at Sundance and others at every major film festival including Cannes, Berlin, Toronto, Tribeca, and New York. In 2024, Washington Square Films served as the NY production company for Pedro Almodóvar's first US production and first English-language feature film The Room Next Door. WSF's Joshua Blum and Han West served as Executive Producers in New York.

In 2023, Washington Square Films produced a live musical based on the 1972 Jamaican film The Harder They Come, with music by Jimmy Cliff and a book and additional songs by Suzan-Lori Parks. The show was developed by Blum and Bruce Miller, and its executive producers included Carmelo Anthony and Asani Swann. It premiered in New York at The Public Theater and was nominated for nine Off-Broadway Awards and won the Outer Critics award for Outstanding New Off-Broadway Musical. On September 3, 2024, Stratford East announced that a stage adaptation of The Harder They Come will be a part of their 140th anniversary season lineup with a book and additional new songs by Suzan-Lori Parks. Blum and Miller returned as producers and Matthew Xia directed. The musical ran from September 13, 2025 to October 25, 2025 and was brought back for a second run from May 16, 2026 to July 4, 2026.

== Filmography ==
Washington Square Films selected features
Year	Title	Director	Distributor
1995	United States of Poetry	Mark Pellington	PBS/ITVS
2006	Old Joy	Kelly Reichardt	Kino International, The Criterion Collection
2007	Adrift in Manhattan	Alfredo Rodriguez de Villa	Screen Media Films
2008	Wendy and Lucy	Kelly Reichardt	Oscilloscope Laboratories
2010	And Everything Is Going Fine	Steven Soderbergh	Sundance Selects
2011	Margin Call	J. C. Chandor	Lionsgate Studios, Roadside Attractions
2012	Francine	Brian M. Cassidy, Melanie Shatzky	Factory 25
2013	All Is Lost	J. C. Chandor	Lionsgate Studios
2013	Bluebird	Lance Edmunds	Factory 25
2014	A Most Violent Year	J. C. Chandor	A24
2014	Listen Up Philip	Alex Ross Perry	Tribeca Film
2015	Queen of Earth	Alex Ross Perry	IFC Films
2016	My Entire High School Sinking Into the Sea	Dash Shaw	GKIDS, Shout! Factory
2017	Crown Heights	Matt Ruskin	IFC Films, Amazon Studios
2017	Golden Exits	Alex Ross Perry	Vertical Entertainment
2017	Permanent	Colette Burson	Magnolia Pictures
2017	Thirst Street	Nathan Silver	Samuel Goldwyn Films
2017	11:55	Ari Issler, Ben Snyder	Gravitas Ventures
2018	Most Likely to Murder	Dan Gregor	Lionsgate Studios
2019	Colewell	Tom Quinn	Gravitas Ventures
2019	Flower Punk	Alison Klayman	The New Yorker
2019	The Projectionist	Abel Ferrara	Kino Lorber
2019	The Sound of Silence	Michael Tyburski	IFC Films
2020	Save Yourselves!	Alex Huston Fischer, Eleanor Wilson	Bleecker Street
2020	The Roads Not Taken	Sally Potter	Bleecker Street
2021	Cryptozoo	Dash Shaw	Magnolia Pictures
2022	Allswell in New York	Ben Snyder	Scatena & Rosner Films
2024	The Room Next Door	Pedro Almodóvar	Sony Pictures Classics, Warner Bros
2026	The Dutchman	Andre Gaines	Rogue Pictures, Inaugural Entertainment
