= Elizabeth Rodriguez =

American actress

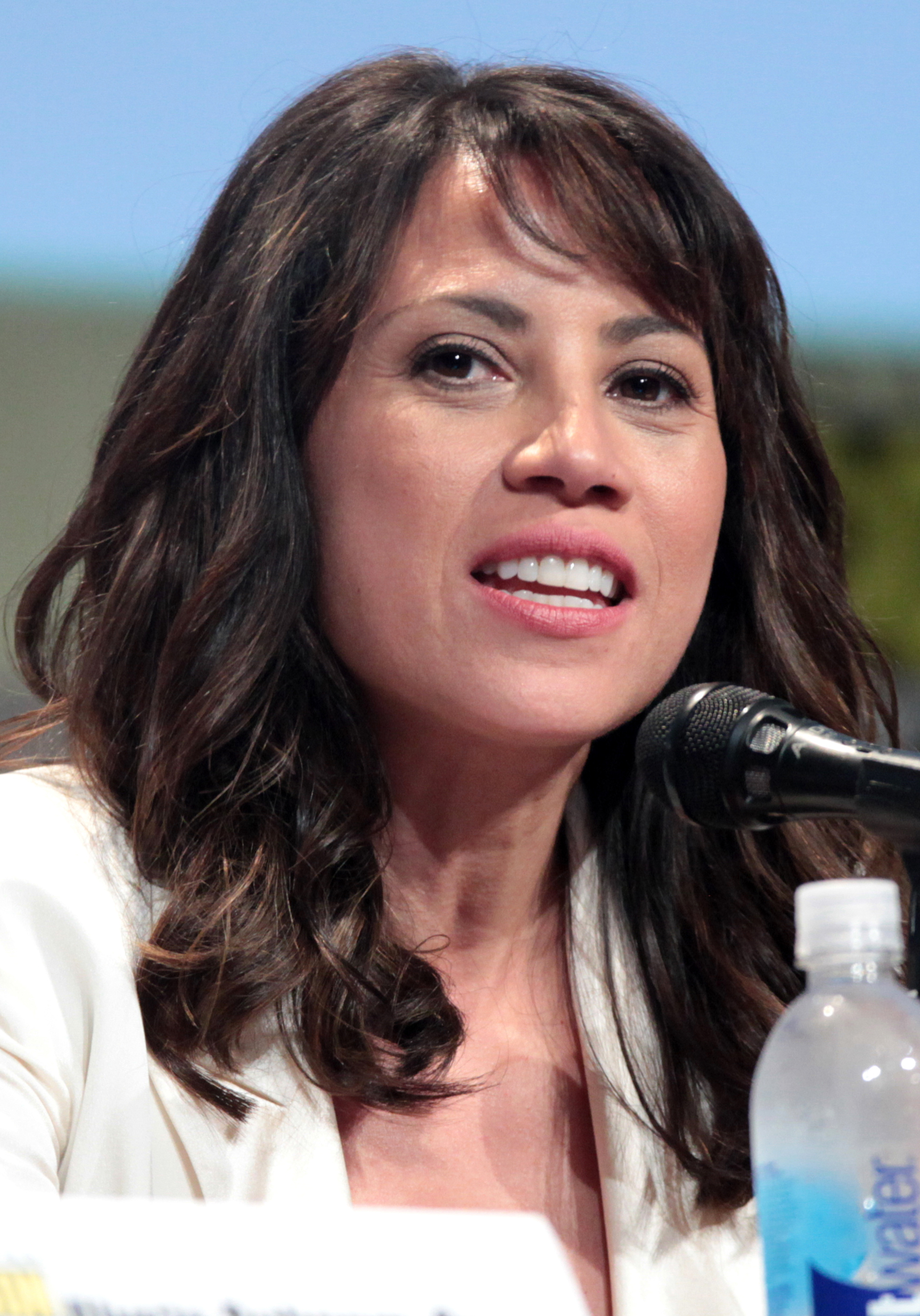
- Rodriguez at the 2015 San Diego Comic-Con.
- Born: New York City, New York, U.S.
- Education: Lehman College
- Occupation: Actress
- Years active: 1991–present

Elizabeth Rodriguez is a Puerto Rican actress. She began her career appearing in films Fresh (1994), Dead Presidents (1995), I Think I Do (1997) and Blow (2001). She played Detective Gina Calabrese in the 2006 film adaptation of Miami Vice.

Rodriguez received a Tony Award nomination and won an Outer Critics Circle Award and a Theatre World Award for her performance in Stephen Adly Guirgis' 2011 play The Motherfucker with the Hat. On television, Rodriguez starred as Aleida Diaz in the Netflix comedy-drama series, Orange Is the New Black (2013–2019). In 2015, she starred in the first season of AMC's post-apocalyptic horror drama series Fear the Walking Dead. She also had recurring roles in Power, Power Book II: Ghost and Shameless and was a regular cast member in Prime Suspect and East New York. She also appeared in films The Drop (2014) and Logan (2017). She co-wrote and starred in the 2022 comedy-drama film, Allswell in New York.

== Early life ==
Rodriguez was born to Puerto Rican parents and raised in Manhattan, New York City. She went to Brandeis High School and Lehman College in the Bronx. She later spent two years at the William Esper Studio in New York and worked as a hair stylist before acting.

== Career ==
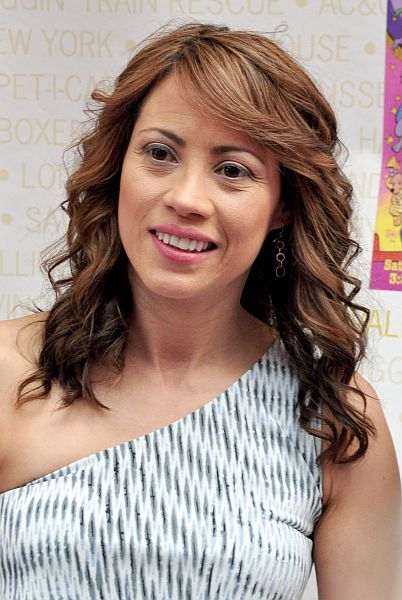
Rodriguez in July 2011.

While still studying, Rodriguez began appearing on-screen playing supporting roles in films Fresh (1994), Dead Presidents (1995) and I Think I Do (1997). On television, Rodriguez made guest appearances in Law & Order, Lifestories: Families in Crisis and CBS Schoolbreak Special, before playing the recurring role in the police drama series, New York Undercover from 1994 to 1995. She later made appearances in New York News, NYPD Blue, Oz, City of Angels, Six Feet Under, ER, Third Watch and The Shield. She co-starred in the 1998 thriller film, Return to Paradise and played Martha Oliveras in the 2001 crime drama film, Blow. In 2006, Rodriguez appeared as Gina Calabrese in the action film, Miami Vice by Michael Mann.

Rodriguez performed in a number of Broadway and off-Broadway productions, such as Robbers, Beauty of the Father, A View From 151st Street, and Unconditional. From 2008 to 2009, Rodriguez played the role of Carmen Morales in the ABC daytime soap opera, All My Children. In 2011, she was nominated for a Tony Award for Best Featured Actress in a Play and won Outer Critics Circle Award, as well as a Theatre World Award, for her role on Broadway play in Stephen Adly Guirgis's The Motherfucker with the Hat. In 2011, she had a series regular role on the short-lived NBC police drama series, Prime Suspect. She was nominated for an Imagen Award for her role in the feature film Tio Papi (2013), and the same year had secondary role in the Side Effects directed by Steven Soderbergh.

In 2013, Rodriguez began appearing in the recurring role of Aleida Diaz in the Netflix comedy-drama series, Orange Is the New Black; she was promoted to series regular in 2015. Along with the rest of the cast she received Screen Actors Guild Award for Outstanding Performance by an Ensemble in a Comedy Series in both 2015 and 2016. Rodriguez also had recurring roles as Paz Valdes in the Starz drama series Power from 2014 to 2020, and as Special Agent Chavez in the NBC police procedural Grimm from 2014 to 2015. In 2014, she appeared in the crime films Glass Chin and The Drop.

In 2015, Rodriguez was cast in the series regular role on the AMC post-apocalyptic drama Fear the Walking Dead, the companion series for The Walking Dead. She left the series after the first season. The following year she had a recurring role in the Lifetime comedy-drama series, Devious Maids. In 2017, she appeared in Hugh Jackman's final Wolverine film Logan directed by James Mangold and starred in the second season of Hulu crime drama, Chance. In 2018, Rodriguez appeared in the teen drama film, Skate Kitchen. From 2019 to 2020 she had the recurring role in the Showtime comedy-drama series, Shameless.

In 2020, Rodriguez won an Obie Award for Distinguished Performance by an Actress and a Drama Desk Award for Outstanding Featured Actress in a Play nomination for her performance in Halfway Bitches Go Straight to Heaven. In June 2021, Rodriguez voiced Rafa Martez in the Star Wars: The Bad Batch episode "Decommissioned".

In 2022, Rodriguez co-wrote, produced and played the leading role in the comedy-drama film, Allswell in New York. The film premiered at the Tribeca Film Festival and Rodriguez received Best Screenplay in a U.S. Narrative Feature Film Award. The film received positive reviews from critics. She also starred as Vanessa del Rio's mother in the biographical drama film, Queen of Manhattan by Thomas Mignone. From 2022 to 2023 she starred in the CBS police drama series, East New York.

== Filmography ==
=== Film ===
Year	Title	Role	Notes
1991	Bedhead	The Nurse	
1994	Fresh	Consuela	
1995	Desperado	Mariachi Fan	
1995	Dead Presidents	Marisol	
1997	I Think I Do	Celia	
1998	Return to Paradise	Gaby	
1999	Golfballs!	Bentwood Girl	
2001	Acts of Worship	Jan	
2001	Blow	Martha Oliveras	
2005	Four Lane Highway	Sasha	
2005	Sueño	Carmen	
2006	Miami Vice	Gina Calabrese	
2007	Tracks of Color	Sonia Martinez	Short film
2007	On Bloody Sunday	Older Isabelle	
2008	A Line in the Sand	Martel	
2010	Jack Goes Boating	Waldorf Event Assistant	
2010	Pound of Flesh	Sergeant Rebecca Ferraro	
2011	All Things Fall Apart	Mrs. Lopez	
2013	Side Effects	Pharmacist	
2013	Tio Papi	"Cheeky"	
2014	Take Care	Nurse Janet	
2014	Glass Chin	Rita Sierra	
2014	The Drop	Detective Romsey	
2016	11:55	Angie	
2017	Logan	Gabriela Lopez	
2018	Skate Kitchen	Renata	
2018	Making Babies	Maria	
2020	Mighty	Leti	Short film
2022	Queen of Manhattan	Mama Sánchez	
2022	Allswell in New York	Daisy	Also writer and producer
2022	We Are Gathered Here Today	Gwen Cantu	
TBA	Tonight at Noon	Sarah	Post-production

=== Television ===
Year	Title	Role	Notes
1994	Lifestories: Families in Crisis	Erika	Episode: "POWER: The Eddie Matos Story"
1994	Law & Order	Elvira Juarez	Episode: "Old Friends"
1994–1995	New York Undercover	Gina	Recurring role, 5 episodes
1995	New York News	Tanya	2 episodes
1995	Inflammable	Tanya Santos	Television film
1995	Law & Order	Caridad Montero	Episode: "Rebels"
1995	NYPD Blue	Amalia Lopez	Episode: "UnAmerican Graffiti"
1997	Oz	Maritza Alvarez	2 episodes
1998	Trinity	Del Bianco	2 episodes
1999–2001	ER	Nurse Sandra	3 episodes
2000	NYPD Blue	Anita Rios	Episode: "Bats Off to Larry"
2001	Just Shoot Me!	Maria	Episode: "Finch and the Fighter"
2001	Six Feet Under	Sylvie	Episode: "Familia"
2002	Without Warning	Selena Sanchez	Television film
2002	Third Watch	Sergeant Chris Reyes	Episode: "The Chosen Few"
2002–2003	The Shield	Lita Valverde	2 episodes
2008–2009	All My Children	Carmen Morales	56 episodes
2009	Law & Order	Isabel Alvarez	Episode: "Boy Gone Astray"
2009	FlashForward	Ingrid Alvarez	Episode: "Playing Cards with Coyote"
2010	Cold Case	Gina Lopresi	Episode: "Bombers"
2011–2012	Prime Suspect	Detective Carolina Rivera	Recurring role, 5 episodes
2012	Law & Order: Special Victims Unit	Carmen Vasquez	Episode: "Home Invasions"
2013–2019	Orange Is the New Black	Aleida Diaz	Main role, 53 episodes
2014–2020	Power	Paz Valdes	Recurring role
2014–2015	Grimm	Special Agent Chavez	Recurring role, 5 episodes
2015–2016	Fear the Walking Dead	Liza Ortiz	Main role (season 1); guest (season 2); 7 episodes
2016	Devious Maids	Josefina	2 episodes
2016	Talking Dead	Herself	Episode: "Date of Death"
2017	Chance	Kristen Clayton	Recurring role (season 2)
2019–2020	Shameless	Faye Donahue	Recurring role (season 10)
2020	Star Wars: The Clone Wars	Rafa Martez (voice)	4 episodes
2020, 2023–2024	Power Book II: Ghost	Paz Valdes	Guest role, Seasons 1, 3 and 4
2021	The Good Doctor	Carina Bardo	Episode: "Waiting"
2021	Star Wars: The Bad Batch	Rafa Martez (voice)	Episode: "Decommissioned"
2022–2023	East New York	Detective Crystal Morales	Main cast
2024	Chicago P.D.	Detective Suarez	Episode: "Pawns"
TBA	The Best of Us		

== Theater ==
Title	Role	Notes
Robbers by Lyle Kessler	Cleo	American Place Theatre; Directed by Marshall Mason
The Last Days of Judas Iscariot by Stephen Adly Guirgis	Saint Monica	Joseph Papp Public Theater / Martinson Hall; Directed by Philip Seymour Hoffman
Beauty of the Father by Nilo Cruz	Marina	New York City Center – Stage II; Directed by Michael Greif
A View From 151st Street by Bob Glaudini	Irene	Joseph Papp Public Theater / LuEsther Hall; Directed by Peter DuBois
Unconditional by Brett C. Leonard	Jessica	Joseph Papp Public Theater / LuEsther Hall; Directed by Mark Wing-Davey
The Motherfucker with the Hat by Stephen Adly Guirgis	Veronica	Broadway; Directed by Anna D. Shapiro
Roger and Vanessa by Brett C. Leonard	Vanessa	Actors' Gang Theatre, Los Angeles; Directed by Silas Weir Mitchell
Den of Thieves by Stephen Adly Guirgis	Buchi	Black Dahlia Theater, Los Angeles; Directed by Matt Shakman
Unorganized Crime by Kenny D'Aquila	Rosie	Elephant Theater, Los Angeles; Directed by David Fofi
The Power of Duff by Stephen Belber	Sue Raspell	Geffen Theatre, Los Angeles; Directed by Peter DuBois

== Awards and nominations ==
Year	Association	Category	Work	Result	Ref.
2011	Tony Award	Best Featured Actress in a Play	The Motherfucker with the Hat	Nominated	
2011	Outer Critics Circle Awards	Outstanding Featured Actress in a Play	The Motherfucker with the Hat	Won	
2011	Theatre World Awards	Lunt-Fontanne Award for Ensemble Excellence	The Motherfucker with the Hat	Won	
2013	Imagen Foundation Awards	Best Supporting Actress – Feature Film	Tio Papi	Nominated	
2014	Screen Actors Guild Award	Outstanding Performance by an Ensemble in a Comedy Series	Orange Is the New Black	Won	
2014	Ovation Award	Lead Actress in a Play	Unorganized Crime	Nominated	
2015	Screen Actors Guild Award	Outstanding Performance by an Ensemble in a Comedy Series	Orange Is the New Black	Won	
2016	Screen Actors Guild Award	Outstanding Performance by an Ensemble in a Comedy Series	Orange Is the New Black	Won	
2017	Screen Actors Guild Award	Outstanding Performance by an Ensemble in a Comedy Series	Orange Is the New Black	Nominated	
2020	Obie Award	Distinguished Performance by an Actress	Halfway Bitches Go Straight to Heaven	Won	
2020	Drama Desk Award	Outstanding Featured Actress in a Play	Halfway Bitches Go Straight to Heaven	Nominated	
2021	Tribeca Film Festival	Best Screenplay in a U.S. Narrative Feature Film	Allswell in New York	Won	
