= Shirley Rumierk =

American actress

- Born: Hell's Kitchen, Manhattan, New York City, U.S.
- Education: Harvard University (AB)
- Occupation: Actress
- Years active: 2005–present
- Spouse: Armando Riesco

Shirley Rumierk (/ruːˈmɪərk/) is an American actress known for her role as Vanessa Suarez in Rise and as Autumn Cox in Manifest.

== Early life and education ==
Shirley Rumierk was born and brought up in Hell's Kitchen, Manhattan, New York City. and is of Puerto Rican and Colombian descent. Rumierk was first introduced to acting when at ten years old she was a participant of the 52nd Street Project, a program that introduces children in Manhattan, to the world of theater by voluntary professionals.

Rumierk attended Trinity School on the Upper West Side and studied economics at Harvard University before switching her major to Hispanic studies, graduating in 1995. During her time at Harvard, Rumierk travelled to Cuba to study Cuban and Caribbean literature, history and architecture, sponsored by the University of Buffalo. Also, at that time, she decided to pursue an acting career, moved back to New York and took an acting conservatory program. Rumierk joined the Oliver Scholars, a non-profit organization serving high-achieving Black and Latino students, graduating in 1995 Rumierk, now an Alumni Council Member, hosted the Fifth Annual Oliver Scholars Gala at Guastavino’s, 59th Street, New York City in 2018.

== Career ==
Rumierk’s screen appearances were numerous but brief until she landed a recurring role in East Willy B in 2011.

In 2016, she landed a main character role as Livvy in the film 11:55 , however, her big break came in 2018, as Vanessa Suarez in ten episodes of the NBC television series Rise.

In 2019, She landed a recurring role as Autumn Cox for 4 episodes of NBC's Manifest. In 2020, Ruierk played a main role as Yolanda Carrion in the Netflix series Teenage Bounty Hunters.

In 2021, she appeared in single episodes of Chicago P.D., and Scenes from a Marriage. In 2022, in single episodes of The Equalizer and East New York.

In 2023, she joined the cast of Zach Braff's film A Good Person which also stars Florence Pugh and Morgan Freeman.

== Filmography ==
=== Film ===
Year	Title	Role	Notes
2005	Dumped!	Analise	
2009	Snapshots		Short film
2010	Illegal	Maribel Chacon	
2011	Gun Hill Road	Jeanette	
2012	Nobody's Nobody's	Melody	Short film
2013	And Then There Was Luz		Short film
2014	Fugly!	Young Moms	
2016	11:55	Livvy	
2016	Collateral Beauty	Mrs. Scott	
2017	We're Doing Fine	Gertie	
2017	Fluff	Mia	Short film
2018	Lesson #1	She	Short film
2019	Lesson #7 by Alberto Ferreras	Daughter	Short film
2019	Seneca	Camila	
2022	Allswell in New York	Kelly	
2022	She Said	Miramax employee	
2023	A Good Person	Dr. Gonzalez	

=== Television ===
Year	Title	Role	Notes
2006	Conviction	Sonia	Episode: "True Love"
2008	Lipstick Jungle	Elba Garcia	Episode: "Chapter Three: Pink Poison"
2008	Life on Mars	Marta	Episode: "Things to Do in New York When You Think You're Dead"
2008	Ugly Betty	Pilar Mejia	Episode: "When Betty Met YETI"
2009	Possible Side Effects	TV Reporter	TV movie
2009	Can Openers	Nancy	TV movie
2009	Cupid	Paula Torres	Episode: "The Tommy Brown Affair"
2010	The Good Wife	Joan	Episode: "Infamy"
2010	Law & Order: Criminal Intent	Assistant District Attorney	Episode: "Inhumane Society"
2010	White Collar	Rebecca Vidal	Episode: "Prisoner's Dilemma"
2011–2012	Dora the Explorer	La Maestra Beatriz / Boots' Mommy / Mama Duck / Doctora Valdés (voice)	2 episodes
2011–2013	East Willy B	Maggie	4 episodes
2012	Game Change	Maria Comella	TV movie
2012	Bronx Warrants	Yvette	TV movie
2013	Murder in Manhattan	Winsome	TV movie
2015	Dora and Friends: Into the City!	Mati (voice)	Episode: "Coconut Cumpleañoso"
2017	Blue Bloods	Parole Officer Ramirez	Episode: "In and Out"
2018	Rise	Vanessa Suarez	10 episodes
2018	Dichos		Unknown episodes
2018	Power	Alexandra Navarro	Episode: "Damage Control"
2018–2023	Manifest	Autumn Cox	Recurring role
2019	New Amsterdam	Sabra Constantin	Episode: "Five Miles West"
2019	Elementary	Audrey Kensit	Episode: "From Russia with Drugs"
2020	Teenage Bounty Hunters	Yolanda Carrion	Main cast
2021	Chicago P.D.	Lisa Martinez	Episode: "Due Process"
2021	Scenes from a Marriage	Dr. Varona	Episode: "Innosense and Panic"
2022	The Equalizer	Rosa Martinez	Episode: "What Dreams May Come"
2022	East New York	Ava Martinez	Episode: "Going Commando"
2023	Alma's Way	Carla (voice)	Episode: "Alma Goes to Puerto Rico"

=== Video games ===
Year	Title	Role
2012	Max Payne 3	Giovanna
2013	Grand Theft Auto V	The Local Population
