= Joey Dedio =

American actor

- Born: September 11, 1963 (age 62); New York City, U.S.
- Occupation: Actor
- Years active: 1984–present

Joey Dedio (born September 11, 1963) is an American actor of Puerto Rican and Italian descent.

== Early life ==
Dedio was born in New York City on September 11, 1963.

== Career ==
While in his 20s, Dedio appeared in the NBC soap opera Another World and the television version of The Karate Kid, as the voice of Daniel LaRusso. He provided the voice of lead character Wheeler in the environmentalist cartoon show Captain Planet and the Planeteers. He voiced a drug dealer in an anti-drug special Cartoon All-Stars to the Rescue, which was introduced by then-President George H. W. Bush and his wife, First Lady Barbara Bush.

His other voice roles include Pound Puppies and the Legend of Big Paw, Extreme Ghostbusters and Denver, the Last Dinosaur.

He later appeared in Sunset Beach and guest starred on Law & Order and Chicago Hope. In theatres, he appeared in off Broadway productions like SoHo Reps Skin and workshopped for Joe Pintauro's Broadway bound The Dead Boy. He has appeared in over fifteen films including L.A. Rules, Somewhere in the City, Where the Day Takes You, Timelock (1996), The Last Great Ride, Queenie in Love, A Good Night to Die, Strays and Trick.

In 2004 he starred in and associate produced Bomb the System. Dedio's first screenplay titled Downtown: A Street Tale was completed in 2006.

Dedio then co-produced the documentary The Providence Effect about the school Providence St. Mel, where President Obama was a community organizer before becoming President of the United States. Dedio then starred opposite Academy Award winner Melissa Leo in the South African drama Lullaby directed by Academy Award nominee Darryl Roodt.

In 2013 Dedio produced the film Musical Chairs directed by Academy Award nominee Susan Seidelman. The film earned the producers a GLADD nomination for Best Feature.

Dedio then wrote and starred in the title role of the hit award-winning film Tio Papi. Dedio was nominated as Best Actor at the 2013 Imagen Awards for his portrayal of Ray Ray Dominguez as well as receiving a key to the city of Miami and Miami Beach for his work on the project. Dedio's next film was the cult classic 36 Saints.

== Filmography ==
=== Film ===
Year	Title	Role	Notes
1988	Pound Puppies and the Legend of Big Paw	Jeff (voice)	Credited as Joey Deidio
1992	Where the Day Takes You	Teen	
1993	The Pros & Cons of Breathing	Tony	
1994	Desert Steel	Jose	
2013	Tio Papi	Tio Papi	

=== Television ===
Year	Title	Role	Notes
1989	The Karate Kid	Daniel LaRusso (voice)	13 episodes
1990–1996	Captain Planet and the Planeteers	Wheeler (voice)	Main cast 113 episodes
1994	Law & Order	Dwyer	Episode: "Family Values"
1995	Chicago Hope	Roberto Rodriguez	Episode: "The Ethics of Hope"
1997	Extreme Ghostbusters	Additional Voice (voice)	Episode: "Rage"
2001	The Atlantis Conspiracy	Bartender	Television movie
