= All Nighter (film) =

2017 American comedy film

- Theatrical release poster
- Directed by: Gavin Wiesen
- Written by: Seth W. Owen
- Produced by: Josh Crook; P. Jennifer Dana; Adi Ezroni; Mandy Tagger
- Starring: J. K. Simmons; Emile Hirsch; Taran Killam; Kristen Schaal; Analeigh Tipton
- Cinematography: Seamus Tierney
- Edited by: Terel Gibson
- Music by: Alec Puro
- Production companies: Spring Pictures; Wing and a Prayer Pictures; Abbolita Films; Heretic Films
- Distributed by: Good Deed Entertainment
- Release date: March 17, 2017
- Running time: 86 minutes
- Country: United States
- Language: English
- Box office: $96,162

All Nighter is a 2017 American comedy film directed by Gavin Wiesen and written by Seth W. Owen. The film stars J. K. Simmons, Emile Hirsch, and Kristen Schaal. Principal photography began on July 6, 2015, on locations in Los Angeles, California.

The film was released in a limited release on March 17, 2017, before being released through video on demand on March 24, 2017, by Good Deed Entertainment.

== Plot ==
Six months after Martin meets Ginnie's estranged father Frank Gallo for the first time, Frank shows up at Martin's door looking for Ginnie who hasn't returned his calls, texts, or emails in ten days. While Martin and Ginnie had broken up three months earlier, Martin, who hates his roommate and who still has feelings for Ginnie, agrees to help Frank look for her.

After Martin and Ginnie broke up, Ginnie moved in with Gary and Roberta, so Frank and Martin first try looking for Ginnie there, but Ginnie has moved out due to Gary leering at her, and neither Robert nor Gary can find the paper they wrote her new address on.

Next Frank and Martin try Ginnie's workplace, a cafe, but her boss tells Martin that Ginnie quit and now works at an upscale restaurant in West Hollywood. When Frank and Martin go there, they find out that she also quit working at her new job two weeks prior.

In a last ditch effort to find Ginnie, Frank and Martin try a club she frequents, where Frank learns that she has a new boyfriend from a bartender. After a fight breaks out between Frank and Trevor, Martin and Frank leave the club, but see Ginnie's friend Megan attempting to drive home drunk. They drive her home instead where Martin learns about Ginnie's new boyfriend from Megan.

Not knowing who the new boyfriend is, Martin and Frank convene at a bar where Martin tells Frank that he and Ginnie broke up because Martin was insecure in their relationship.They then randomly encounter Gary, who has been fighting with Roberta. When Gary suggests they eat hallucinogenic mushrooms he has been storing in his wallet, they realize that the paper which the mushrooms are wrapped in has Ginnie's new address written on it.

No one answers at Ginnie's new apartment, and so Frank breaks in to look for Ginnie. Upset by Frank's refusal to call his ex-wife (Ginnie's mom) to ask if she has talked to Ginnie, Martin waits outside and calls her. Ginnie's mom tells Martin that Ginnie went on vacation with her new boyfriend Kip, but when Martin enters Ginnie's new apartment to tell Frank, Ginnie's roommate comes home, chases both of them with a knife and calls the police.

As Martin and Frank are arrested, Ginnie, who is perfectly fine, comes home from her vacation with her new boyfriend Kip. In jail, Frank tells Martin that he had a panic attack ten days ago, and that he immediately called Ginnie, because he has no one else. After they are released, Frank makes amends with Ginnie, finally calls his ex-wife, and meets her new boyfriend Kip. Martin tells Ginnie that he is truly happy that she has found someone, kicks out his roommate Jimothy, and practices his banjo for a show later in the week with his band.

in the final scene, Martin plays his banjo with his band with Frank in attendance. In the intermission, Martin is finally able to call Mr. Gallo by his first name, who encourages Martin to go ahead and spend time with his new love interest, Lois.

== Cast ==
- J. K. Simmons as Mr. Gallo
- Emile Hirsch as Martin
- Jon Daly as Jimothy
- Taran Killam as Gary
- Xosha Roquemore as Megan
- Kristen Schaal as Roberta
- Analeigh Tipton as Ginnie
- Jon Bass as Trevor
- Shannon Woodward as Lois

== Production ==
On April 30, 2015, it was announced that Gavin Wiesen would next direct the buddy comedy film The Runaround based on the script by Seth W. Owen, which would star J. K. Simmons as a workaholic father and Emile Hirsch as his daughter's ex-boyfriend. Producers of the film would be Mandy Tagger and Adi Ezroni through Spring Pictures, Ron Perlman and Josh Crook through Wing and a Prayer Pictures, along with P. Jennifer Dana. On July 24, 2015, Kristen Schaal joined the cast. On August 6, 2015, more cast members were announced, including Jon Daly, Taran Killam, Hunter Parrish, Analeigh Tipton, Bojesse Christopher, and Shannon Woodward.

=== Filming ===
Principal photography on the film began on July 6, 2015, in Los Angeles.

== Release ==
In November 2016, Good Deed Entertainment acquired U.S. distribution rights to the film. The film's title was changed from The Runaround to All Nighter, and it received a limited release in theaters on March 17, 2017, before being released through video on demand on March 24, 2017.

== Reception ==
The film received negative reviews. On Rotten Tomatoes, the film has an approval rating of 14% based on 14 reviews. Metacritic, which uses a weighted average, assigned the film a score of 37 out of 100, based on 4 critics, indicating "generally unfavorable" reviews.
