= The Karate Kid (TV series) =

Television series

- Genre: Children's television series
- Based on: The Karate Kid by Robert Mark Kamen
- Developed by: Dan DiStefano
- Written by: Dorothy Middleton; Michael Maurer
- Directed by: Larry Houston
- Voices of: Joey Dedio; Robert Ito; Janice Kawaye; Pat Morita
- Composers: Haim Saban; Shuki Levy
- Country of origin: United States
- Original language: English
- No. of seasons: 1
- No. of episodes: 13

Production
- Executive producers: Jerry Weintraub; Andy Heyward; Haim Saban
- Producer: Larry Houston
- Running time: 23 minutes
- Production companies: DIC Animation City; Saban Entertainment; Columbia Pictures Television

Original release
- Network: NBC
- Release: September 9 – December 16, 1989

Related
- The Karate Kid

The Karate Kid is a 1989 American animated children's television series which debuted on NBC's Saturday morning lineup. It starred Joey Dedio, Robert Ito, and Janice Kawaye. It is based on the Karate Kid series of films, and was produced by DIC Animation City, Saban Entertainment and Columbia Pictures Television. The show was originally planned for daily syndication for fall 1988 with 65 episodes, before eventually settling on a 13-episode order for NBC in 1989.

== Overview ==
The show retains apprentice Daniel LaRusso (voiced by Joey Dedio) and his mentor Mr. Miyagi (voiced by Robert Ito), but abandons the karate tournament motif for an adventure/quest setting. A miniature shrine with magic powers is taken from its resting place on Okinawa, and it is up to Miyagi and Daniel to recover it. Together with Okinawan girl Taki Tamurai (voiced by Janice Kawaye), the karatekas search the globe and, naturally, encounter several opportunities to fight their way out of trouble.

Pat Morita reprised his role as Mr. Miyagi from the films, providing opening narration for every episode aside from episode 8, in which he explains the episode's plot from his character's point of view.

=== Episode formula ===
The episodes typically follow a similar formula: Mr. Miyagi obtains a lead on the shrine's location in some exotic corner of the world. Daniel and Taki follow up on it, and in the process encounter some villains who have either obtained or are seeking to obtain the shrine for their own evil purposes. After engaging and defeating the villains, Daniel comes within a hair's breadth of retrieving the shrine, only to have it escape from his grasp by random chance (for example, drifting away after being tied to a bunch of balloons, or being swept into the ocean), thus ensuring that the search continues into the next episode.

== Cast ==
- Joey Dedio as Daniel LaRusso
- Robert Ito as Mr. Miyagi
- Janice Kawaye as Taki Tamurai

=== Additional voices ===
- Charlie Adler
- James Avery
- Bever-Leigh Banfield
- Michael Bell
- Bettina Bush
- Darleen Carr
- François Chau
- Cam Clarke
- Townsend Coleman
- Danny Cooksey
- Brian Cummings
- Jim Cummings
- E. G. Daily (uncredited)
- Debi Derryberry
- Shawn Donahue
- Fernando Escandon
- Ron Feinberg
- Takayo Fischer
- Linda Gary
- Ellen Gerstell
- Ed Gilbert
- Salim Grant
- Edan Gross
- Ernest Harada
- Billie Hayes
- Dana Hill
- Michael Horton
- Jerry Houser
- Buster Jones
- Dana Lee
- Katie Leigh
- Kadar Lewis
- Sherry Lynn
- Mary McDonald-Lewis
- Joey Miyashima
- Claudette Nevins
- Toy Newkirk
- Dyana Ortelli
- Rob Paulsen
- Diane Pershing
- Brock Peters
- Hal Rayle
- Peter Renaday
- Robert Ridgely
- Davis Roberts
- Josh Rodine
- Neil Ross
- Kath Soucie
- John Stephenson
- Cree Summer
- Brian Tochi
- Tamlyn Tomita
- Marcelo Tubert
- Chick Vennera
- B. J. Ward
- Anthony Watson
- R. J. Williams
- Anderson Wong
- Keone Young

== Crew ==
- Ginny McSwain – voice director
- Dorothy Middleton - story editor
- Michael Maurer - story editor

== Episodes ==
No.	Title	Written by	Original release date	Prod. code
1	"My Brother's Keeper"	Dorothy Middleton; Michael Maurer	September 9, 1989	101
In South America, a diffident teenager from a Shuar tribe finds the shrine and believes it can give him the confidence and strength to pass his tests of manhood. Miyagi shows him that confidence does not come from the shrine but from within, and Daniel works with the boy in a series of physical tests to prepare for the warrior rites.
2	"The Greatest Victory"	Matt Uitz; Michael Maurer; Dorothy Middleton	September 16, 1989	102
In Hong Kong, a neighborhood has been threatened by a crime gang known as Dragon. A group of activists figure the shrine could help them defeat Dragon, but when the gang leader seizes the shrine, he uses it to brainwash people into being his hoods. Miyagi teaches that the way to deal with organized crime is through collective action, and the natives form a community watch group and help bring awareness of the misdeeds of Dragon.
3	"The Homecoming"	Sean Roche; David Ehrman; Michael Maurer; Dorothy Middleton	September 23, 1989	103
The trio are paying a visit to New York City to find the shrine in New Jersey where Daniel used to live.
4	"The Tomorrow Man"	Rick Merwin; Michael Maurer; Dorothy Middleton	September 30, 1989	104
In Paris, France, the trio is in pursuit of a smuggler known for his affinity for chocolate parfait, as he is looking for the shrine. A man known as Amazing Roland pretends to be a clairvoyant to entertain tourists, but has been getting actual psychic visions, including the one that shows Mr. Miyagi's possible death, causing Daniel to panic. Mr. Miyagi convinces Daniel that fate must run its course.
5	"All the World His Stage"	Karen Wilson; Chris Weber; Michael Maurer; Dorothy Middleton	October 14, 1989	105
While in London, United Kingdom, the trio get hired on a movie set about King Arthur, where Miyagi finds the power of the shrine has been drained into a prop sword, which is used by the film's leading man who then cannot separate reality from fantasy and thinks Taki is his actual bride, and Daniel is threatening him.
6	"The Paper Hero"	Matt Uitz; Dorothy Middleton; Michael Maurer	October 21, 1989	106
The trio is in Tijuana, Mexico, where Daniel runs into his Uncle Jack, an FBI employee. Daniel is enthralled with his uncle's FBI work until he admits his job was to file reports, and that he is investigating a case of small-time banditos threatening villages along the Mexico-US border, and are now abusing the shrine to go from minor offenses to commit major crimes as supervillains. Daniel has a problem with the sandstorms blinding him, and Miyagi teaches him to use his other four senses to fight. Daniel's uncle Jack learns there is no shame in having his current FBI job. Uncle Jack only appeared in this episode.
7	"Over the Rainbow"	Michael Maurer; Dorothy Middleton	October 28, 1989	107
In the Himalayas, the shrine is in a mountain spring, which has caused the waters to reverse the aging process. In the nearby village, the council of elders used the waters to become young again in order to fill a generation gap and convince their teenagers not to leave, but the village council enjoyed being young and forgot their responsibilities, and now the village has become focused on partying instead of working hard. When a snowstorm threatens the village, the unrenovated houses and lack of proper civil defense could doom them.
8	"The Return of the Shrine"	Dorothy Middleton; Michael Maurer	November 4, 1989	108
Daniel, Miyagi, and Taki succeed in returning the shrine to Okinawa, but at home Taki has to deal with a family feud that could lead to the shrine being lost once again.
9	"Walkabout"	Matt Uitz; Michael Maurer; Dorothy Middleton	November 11, 1989	109
In Australia, Daniel meets an Aboriginee man who has seen the shrine, but he is blackmailed by members of his tribe. The trio's friend is torn between whom he should help.
10	"East Meets West"	Michael Maurer; Dorothy Middleton	November 18, 1989	110
In what used to be the USSR, the group find the shrine in a Soviet scientific research facility. The Friendship Games are taking place with the first time that Western nations have been invited in an effort to promote glasnost. Daniel has been put on the West's hockey team, which he worries that he cannot even skate, resorting to Mr. Miyagi's unconventional lessons once again. Meanwhile, one scientist steals the shrine to empower his son, who is playing on the East's hockey team, in order to prove the supremacy of the Soviets, only for both to get more than they bargained for.
11	"The Hunt"	Rick Merwin; Dorothy Middleton; Michael Maurer	December 2, 1989	111
The trio get a job aboard a whaling vessel in Norway after seeing a white whale that has swallowed the shrine.
12	"The Gray Ghosts"	Karen Wilson; Chris Weber; Michael Maurer; Dorothy Middleton	December 9, 1989	112
The trio goes to San Francisco where they find a group of senior citizens known as the "Gray Ghosts", so named because they were enthusiasts of the classic car by the same name. They learn the shrine may be in possession of a reclusive tycoon named Frump. Daniel has to work with one of the Gray Ghosts, who is very different from the stereotypes Daniel has about old ladies.
13	"A Little World of His Own"	Dorothy Middleton; Michael Maurer	December 16, 1989	113
Somewhere in the South, the shrine has come under possession of a shy boy named Walter, who uses the power of the shrine to shrink actual items such as railroad cars and add them to his model collection. In doing so, Walter resorts to using the shrine to shrink the trio when Daniel tries to get it back. A tiny Daniel and Miyagi must work to give Walter a confidence boost to ask a girl out to a party in the hopes of reverting to their proper sizes. Walter, however, is using the shrine for more than just scale models, as he also uses it for revenge on two bullies, and Miyagi warns that not only is such overuse damaging the shrine, but vengeance is also unhealthy.

== Home media and streaming ==
The Karate Kid was available for purchase on iTunes, and could be streamed for free in the U.S. on Netflix, IMDb, Hulu, The Minisode Network, and Crackle. The show was later available for purchase on Amazon Prime.

In Canada, the series can be streamed online via CTV's "CTV Throwback" video on demand service.

In 2025, the complete series was released on 4K Blu-ray via The Karate Kid Ultimate 6-Movie Collection, specifically as a special feature for The Karate Kid Part III.

== Canonicity ==
With regards to the sequel series Cobra Kai, co-creator Jon Hurwitz clarified that, while the series is not canon, an Easter Egg from it appears in Season 3 in response to a question about its official status within the wider Karate Kid universe. The Easter Egg in question appears in the form of the Miyagi-Do shrine, briefly seen at Chozen Toguchi's dojo in Okinawa halfway through the season.
