= Tio Papi =

- Film poster
- Directed by: Fro Rojas
- Screenplay by: Joey Dedio; Brian Herskovitz
- Produced by: Janet Carrus; Joey Dedio; Debbie Margolis-Horowitz; Brian Herskowitz
- Starring: Joey Dedio; Elizabeth Rodriguez; Kelly McGillis; Frankie Faison
- Cinematography: Sherman Johnson
- Edited by: Fro Rojas; Goodpenny
- Music by: Josh Klein
- Release date: September 6, 2013
- Running time: 90 minutes
- Country: United States
- Language: English

Tio Papi is a 2013 American comedy-drama film directed by Fro Rojas, and starring Joey Dedio, Elizabeth Rodriguez, Kelly McGillis and Frankie Faison.

== Cast ==
- Joey Dedio
- Elizabeth Rodriguez
- Kelly McGillis
- Frankie Faison
- Gabriella Fanuele
- David Castro
- Fátima Ptacek
- Sebastian Martinez
- Nicolette Pierini
- Dax Roy

== Release ==
The film was released in theaters on September 6, 2013.

== Reception ==
The film has a 29% rating on Rotten Tomatoes. Sandie Angulo Chen of Common Sense Media awarded the film three stars out of five.
