= Redlight (film) =

2009 film by Adi Ezroni

- Directed by: Guy Jacobson; Adi Ezroni; Charles Kiselyak
- Written by: Colin K. Gray; Guy Jacobson; Megan Raney
- Produced by: Kerry Girvin; Lucy Liu; Adi Ezroni; Guy Jacobson; Charles Kiselyak; Colin K. Gray; Megan Raney
- Starring: Somaly Mam; Susan Bissell; Kevin Bales
- Narrated by: Lucy Liu
- Cinematography: Guy Jackson
- Edited by: Denise Cochran; Kerry Girvin; Jane Rizzo
- Music by: Kurt Gellersted; Mark Stephan Kondracki; Soren Sorensen
- Distributed by: Guggenheim Girvin Pictures; Max Entertainment; Priority Films
- Release date: October 4, 2009 (United States)
- Running time: 72 minutes
- Country: United States
- Languages: English; Khmer
- Budget: $500,000

Redlight (sometimes misspelled Red Light) is a documentary film about human trafficking in Cambodia that premiered on October 4, 2009 at the Woodstock Film Festival. Lucy Liu was the film's executive producer and narrator. The film is produced by Kerry Girvin and directed by Guy Jacobson and Adi Ezroni. Redlight documents four years of the lives of several Cambodian children who are kidnapped for the purpose of child prostitution. These children are both boys and girls, and some are only 3 or 4 years old. Some of the film's footage was recorded secretly in brothels and then smuggled out. Liu promoted the film at the 2009 Cairo International Film Festival. Showtime televised the film as part of Human Trafficking Awareness Month in 2010. The first screening in Connecticut took place in Westport that November.
