= Holly (2006 film) =

2006 American film by Guy Moshe

- Theatrical release poster
- Directed by: Guy Moshe
- Written by: Guy Moshe; Guy Jacobson
- Produced by: Adi Ezroni; Guy Jacobson; Nava Levin
- Starring: Ron Livingston; Chris Penn; Virginie Ledoyen; Udo Kier; Thuy Nguyen
- Cinematography: Yaron Orbach
- Edited by: Isabela Monteiro de Castro
- Music by: Tôn-Thât Tiêt
- Distributed by: Easternlight Films
- Release dates: August 16, 2006 (Edinburgh Film Festival); November 9, 2007 (United States)
- Running time: 113 minutes
- Country: United States
- Languages: English; Khmer; Vietnamese

Holly is a 2006 drama film directed by Guy Moshe. The film is about an American stolen artifacts dealer in Cambodia who tries to save a young girl from child traffickers. It stars Ron Livingston, Chris Penn, and Thuy Nguyen. Shot on location in Cambodia, it includes many scenes in actual brothels in the notorious red light district of Phnom Penh.

== Plot ==
Patrick Thom, an American card shark and dealer of stolen artifacts, has been "comfortably numb" in Cambodia for years, when he encounters Holly, a 12-year-old Vietnamese girl, in the K-11 red light village. The girl has been sold by her impoverished family and smuggled across the border to work as a prostitute.

Patrick wants to save Holly, but Marie, a social worker tells him that paying for her freedom will supply the demand of the traffickers, which will cause more children to be trafficked. The social worker also tells him that the U.S. will not let him adopt Holly. Marie also informs him of the issues of reintegrating her into society.

== Cast ==
- Ron Livingston as Patrick Thom
- Chris Penn as Freddie Vibal
- Udo Kier as Klaus
- Virginie Ledoyen as Marie
- Jacquie Nguyen as Holly
- Sahajak Boonthanakit as Tommy
- Adi Ezroni asEmma
- Chaya Supannarat as Lan

== Production ==
=== Writing ===
In an interview in 2007, Moshe was inspired by a script by Guy Jacobson which Moshe felt had "tremendous potential". He took the script to his producing partner Nava Levin, who also worked on the film with him.

=== Filming ===
The film was shot at a 200 ASA filming speed to make a unique grain structure and contrasted color. Moshe said that the film was very hard to produce, due to the fact that there were multiple languages being spoken, shooting six-day weeks, 17-hour days, in 100 degree Fahrenheit, and some of the cast members had received food poisoning.

== Reception ==
On the review aggregator website Rotten Tomatoes, 65% of 23 critics' reviews are positive, with an average rating of 5.4/10. The website's consensus reads: "Despite some execution problems, Holly remains a realistic and gritty look at child sex slavery." Metacritic, which uses a weighted average, assigned the film a score of 51 out of 100, based on 13 critics, indicating "mixed or average" reviews. Jeannette Catsoulis of the New York Times called the film a "riveting story". She commented: "What could have been a gripping study of emotional resurrection devolves into a blurred odyssey of white guilt." Luke Y. Thompson of the San Luis Obispo New Times praised the film for avoiding "the need to switch to slo-mo and cue the violins".
