= Adi Ezroni =

Israeli actress, TV host, and film producer (born 1978)

- עדי עזרוני
- Born: November 16, 1978 (age 47); Herzliya, Israel
- Occupations: Actress, producer
- Spouse: Matt Schuman
- Children: 2

Adi Ezroni (Hebrew: עדי עזרוני; born November 16, 1978) is an Israeli actress, model, producer, TV host, and film studio executive.

== Media career ==
She was born in Israel to a Jewish family.

She served as a soldier in the Israel Defense Forces. Subsequently, Ezroni joined the Israeli children channel, Arutz HaYeladim, where she hosted its main shows until 2003. She played in the comic TV show Zbeng! as Sivan, Hapijamot as a guest star and in the movie Wild as Rananit. She also modeled for Lord Kitsch.

On Channel 10, Ezroni appeared as Shira in the drama Matay Nitnashek, with Lior Ashkenazi.

In 2006, Ezroni produced the film Holly. In that year she began appearing in the TV drama Hatufim (Hostages) as Yael Ben-Horin. In 2016, she produced All Nighter through her Spring Pictures banner.

In 2022, she joined Candle Media subsidiary Faraway Road Productions as head of production and creative development.

== Filmography ==
As producer

- Holly (2006)
- Redlight (2009)
- Kelly & Cal (2014)
- The Runaround (2016)
- Saturday Church (2017)
- The Sound of Silence (2019)
- Save Yourselves! (2020)
- Tatami (2023)

As director

- Redlight (2009)

== See also ==
- Television in Israel
- Cinema of Israel
