= United States of Poetry =

- Genre: Poetry
- Created by: Joshua Blum and Bob Holman
- Directed by: Mark Pellington
- Country of origin: United States
- Original language: English
- No. of episodes: 5

Original release
- Release: 1995

United States of Poetry (USOP) was a five-part American television series created for PBS. The series' first aired in February 1995. USOP was created and produced by Joshua Blum, the founder of Washington Square Films, and New York poet Bob Holman and director, Mark Pellington.

The anthology was composed of five half-hour segments and featured more than 60 poets including three Nobel Prize winners, rappers, slammers, cowboys, and a seven-year-old jump-rope artist. It was accompanied by a book published by Abrams Books and a soundtrack album with music by Tomandandy issued by Mouth Almighty Records, under Mercury Records. The book contained an extra sixth section for poems that did not make the series.

== History ==
In 1990, Joshua Blum met Bob Holman at the Nuyorican Poets Café, where Holman had helped popularize slam poetry. Despite Holman's initial aversion to the idea of television, Blum convinced him to make a demo for MTV featuring 40 local poets called "Smokin' Word". The concept was to bring the production values of high-end music videos and experimental television to poetry for the purpose of "not selling anything". Smokin' Word was co-directed by Joel Blumsack and Rick Reta, and hosted by Matthew Courtney. MTV rejected the project, but when the team added Pellington as director, a third producer, Terri McCoy, brought the show to Public Television's "Alive TV", who greenlit the idea for a single program Words in Your Face. Words in Your Face which aired in 1991, served as a stylistic demo for the United States of Poetry, and was widely considered a breakthrough in merging poetry and television.

In 1992, Blum, Holman, and Pellington began working on a proposal that would expand the scope of Words in Your Face to a national scale. While Words in Your Face was centered on artists from New York City's East Village, The United States of Poetry would travel the country to showcase the diverse voices of America through its living poets. The plan was for the poets to collaborate with the filmmakers on the visualization of their poems.

The project received developmental funding from the New York State Council on the Arts and the Greenwall Foundation. In 1993, the team brought the pitch to Independent Television Service (ITVS). ITVS liked the pitch for its geographical diversity and grass roots appeal, and funded the project as a five part limited series. Additional funding came from the National Endowment for the Arts and from Fillmore Mercantile.

In April 1994, Blum, Holman, Pellington, and a crew of twelve, including Co-producer Anne Mullen and Director of Photography Tom Krueger set off on a twelve-week 13,400 mile-trip on a pink and magenta tour bus to film 90 poets, 60 of which were selected for the program.

== Episodes ==
List of episodes:

- Show One: "The Land and the People"
  - Featured poets: Henry Real Bird, George Ella Lyon, Jeff Tagami, Tracie Morris, Lois-Ann Yamanaka, Naomi Shihab Nye, Nora Marks Dauenhauer, Lord Buckley, Sparrow, Everton Sylvester, Rita Dove, James Still
- Show Two: "A Day in the Life"
  - Featured poets: Thylias Moss, Czeslaw Milosz, Peter Spiro, Rev. Pedro Pietri, Ismail Azim El, Sheryl Noethe, Matt Cook, Dan Powers, Hal Sirowitz, Paul Beatty, C.D. Wright, Dennis Cooper, Derek Walcott
- Show Three: "The American Dream"
  - Featured poets: Thylias Moss, Leonard Cohen, Amiri Baraka, Nerissa Diaz, John Wright, Vess Quinlan, Genny Lim, Ruth Forman, Jim Northrup, Luís Alfaro, Wanda Coleman, Javier Piña, Robert Chambers, Lawrence Ferlinghetti
- Show Four: "Love and Sex"
  - Featured poets: Pearl Cleage, Sue Wallis, Allen Ginsberg, Maggie Estep, Indran Amirthanayagam, John S. Hall, Quincy Troupe, Lou Reed, Joseph Brodsky, Miguel Algarín, Sandra Cisneros, Lypsinka
- Show Five: "The Word"
  - Featured poets: Carla Harryman, Robert Creeley, Willie Perdomo, Sawyer Shefts, Russell Leong, Michelle T. Clinton, Jack Kerouac/Johnny Depp, Larry Eigner, Jimmy Carter, Michael Franti, Emily XYZ, Besmilr Brigham, Ai, Peter Cook
- Show Six: "Portraits" (featured in the book adaptation, not the series)
  - Featured poets: Juli Yancy, Kell Robertson, Maureen Owen, Linda Hasselstrom, Keith Wilson, Mike Romoth, Wallace McRae, Michele M. Serros, D-Knowledge (Derick I.M. Gilbert), Sean McNally, Mike Tyler, Marc Smith, John Trudell
