= Ron Livingston =

American actor (born 1967)

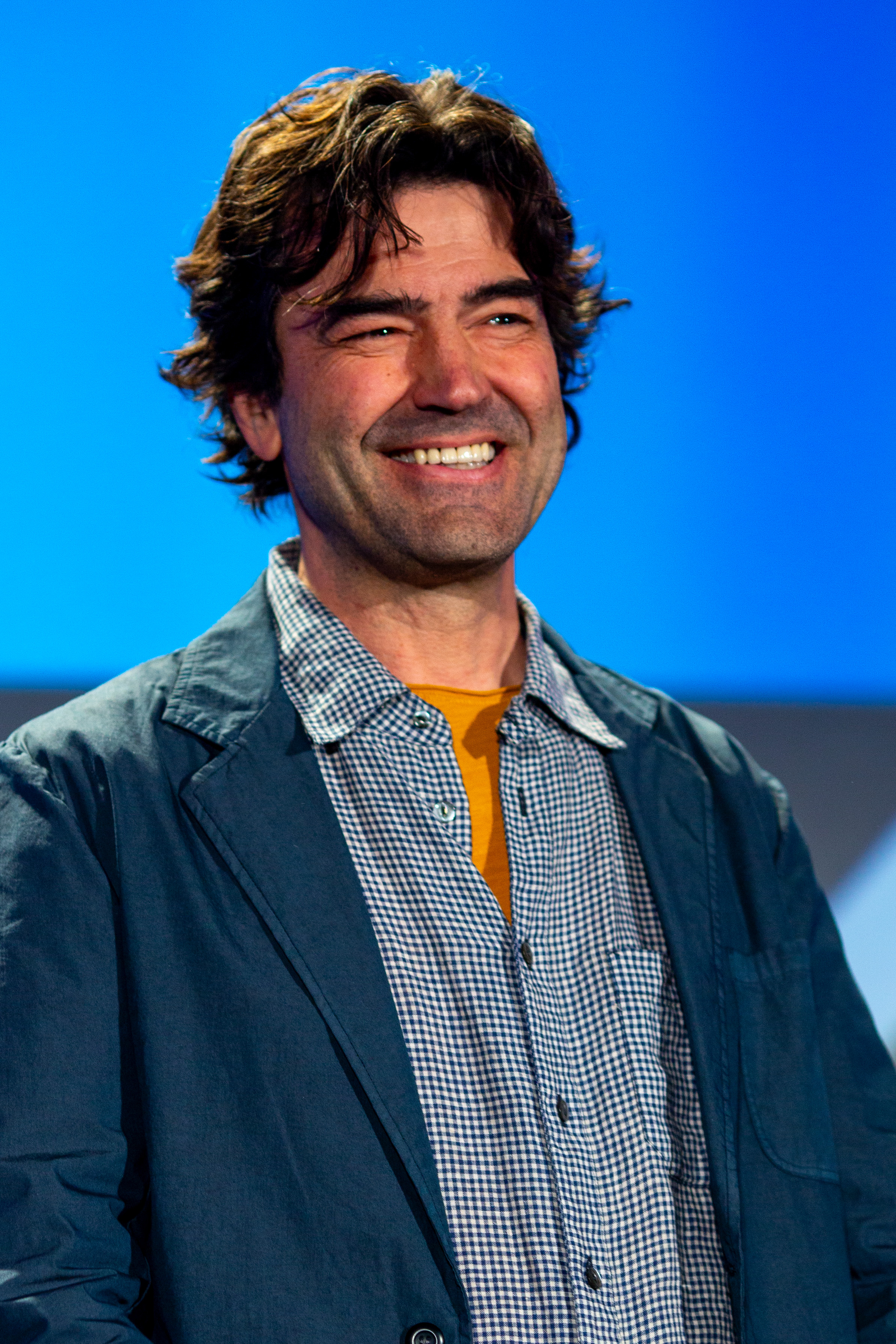
- Livingston in 2024
- Born: Ronald Joseph Livingston; June 5, 1967 (age 59); Cedar Rapids, Iowa, U.S.
- Education: Yale University (BA)
- Occupation: Actor
- Years active: 1992–present
- Spouse: Rosemarie DeWitt (m. 2009)
- Children: 2 (adopted)

Ronald Joseph Livingston (born June 5, 1967) is an American actor. He starred as Peter Gibbons in Office Space (1999) and Captain Lewis Nixon III in the miniseries Band of Brothers (2001). Livingston's other roles include the films Swingers (1996), Adaptation. (2002), The Conjuring (2013), James White (2015), Tully (2018); and the television series Loudermilk (2017–2020), and Boardwalk Empire (2013).

== Early life and education ==
Ronald Joseph Livingston was born on June 5, 1967 in Cedar Rapids, Iowa, to Kurt Livingston, an aerospace electronics engineer, and Linda (née Rinas), a Lutheran pastor. He has two brothers and one sister. His younger brother, John, is also an actor. Both his sister, Jennifer Livingston, and brother-in-law, Mike Thompson, were TV news personalities at WKBT-DT in La Crosse, Wisconsin.

Livingston attended Yale University, where he sang with The Whiffenpoofs and graduated in 1989, in the same class as Anderson Cooper. He graduated with a B.A. degree in Theatre Studies and English Literature.

Livingston first acted at Theatre Cedar Rapids after being introduced to the group during a school job shadowing. After graduating from Yale in 1989, he moved to Chicago, where he appeared in productions at the Goodman Theatre and befriended Jon Favreau, who was then performing improvisational comedy in the city.

== Career ==
In 1992, Livingston landed his first film role in Dolly Parton's Straight Talk. He later moved to Los Angeles, where he was cast in supporting roles in Some Folks Call It a Sling Blade and The Low Life. In 1996, he had his first major role in Swingers, written by and co-starring Favreau.

In 1998, Livingston worked in Austin on Mike Judge's Office Space and served as an emcee at the third Big Stinkin' International Improv & Sketch Comedy Festival. Released in 1999, the film co-starred Jennifer Aniston, with Livingston playing the lead role of Peter Gibbons. In 2001, he appeared in HBO's miniseries Band of Brothers as Captain Lewis Nixon III opposite Donnie Wahlberg and Damian Lewis. Livingston widened his variety of roles when he played a Hollywood agent in Adaptation. (2002), a weaselly Ivy League upstart opposite Alec Baldwin's casino boss in The Cooler (2003) and teachers in Winter Solstice and Pretty Persuasion (both in 2005). He also appeared as sardonic writer Jack Berger, Carrie's short-term boyfriend in the fifth and sixth seasons of Sex and the City. He guest starred in the episode "TB or Not TB" of House. In 2006, he starred as FBI negotiator Matt Flannery in the Fox series Standoff, co-starring Rosemarie DeWitt, and he was an advertising spokesman for Sprint Nextel.

In summer 2007, Livingston appeared on the off-Broadway stage in the world premiere of Neil LaBute's In a Dark Dark House, produced by MCC Theater, with Frederick Weller and Louisa Krause. The show ran May–July at the Lucille Lortel Theatre in New York City. In November 2007, the indie film Holly told the story of a Vietnamese girl trafficked into the sex trade in Cambodia. Livingston starred as Patrick, a shady card shark who becomes determined to save Holly from her ill-destined fate.

In 2009, Livingston portrayed flight engineer Maddux Donner in the series Defying Gravity, which was cancelled after its first season, and starred in the science fiction romantic drama The Time Traveler's Wife. In 2010, he co-starred in the Jay Roach comedy Dinner for Schmucks.

On February 26, 2013, Entertainment Weekly confirmed that Livingston would be joining the cast of HBO's Boardwalk Empire for the fourth season. Also in 2013, he starred in the hit horror film The Conjuring alongside Lili Taylor, and co-starred in the indie comedy Drinking Buddies alongside Olivia Wilde, Jake Johnson and Anna Kendrick. Drinking Buddies received positive reviews from critics. Rotten Tomatoes gives the film a score of 82% based on 97 reviews.

In 2015, Livingston appeared in the indie drama James White, as well as the comedy films Vacation and Addicted to Fresno. From 2017 to 2020, Livingston starred in the Peter Farrelly–produced comedy television series Loudermilk on the Audience network. Livingston played the title role of Sam Loudermilk, a former music critic and recovering alcoholic who works as a substance abuse counsellor and support group leader, and who regularly doles out clever but acid-tongued critiques to his clients, his friends, and random people he encounters. The show premiered in October 2017 and was renewed in April 2018 for a second season that premiered in October 2018. In December 2018, Audience renewed the series for a third season. After Audience ceased operations, the third season premiered on Amazon Prime Video in 2020–21.

In 2018, Livingston starred in the comedy drama film Tully, and from 2018 to 2023, he appeared in the ABC drama A Million Little Things as Jon Dixon, whose suicide causes his group of friends to evaluate their own lives. In 2023, he portrayed Henry Allen in the superhero film The Flash.

== Personal life ==
Livingston and his Standoff co-star Rosemarie DeWitt began a relationship after meeting on the show. After dating for three years, they married on November 2, 2009, in San Francisco. He was previously engaged to actress Lisa Sheridan.

In May 2013, Livingston and DeWitt announced they had adopted an infant girl born the previous month. In December 2016, the couple announced they had adopted another child, a girl, who was born the previous year.

== Filmography ==
=== Film ===
Year	Title	Role	Notes
1992	Straight Talk	Soldier	
1994	Some Folks Call It a Sling Blade	Himself	Short film
1995	The Low Life	Chad	
1996	Swingers	Rob	
1997	Campfire Tales	Rick / RV Driver	Segments: "The Honeymoon" and "The Campfire"
1999	Dill Scallion	Ron Statlin	
1999	Office Space	Peter	
1999	The Big Brass Ring	Sheldon Buckle	
1999	Two Ninas	Marty Sachs	
1999	Body Shots	Trent	
2000	Beat	Allen Ginsberg	
2000	A Rumour of Angels	Uncle Charlie	
2002	Buying the Cow	Tyler Carter Bellows	
2002	Adaptation.	Marty Bowen	
2003	The Cooler	Larry Sokolov	
2003	King of the Ants	Eric Gatley	Uncredited
2003	44 Minutes: The North Hollywood Shoot-Out	Donnie Anderson	Television movie
2004	Little Black Book	Derek	
2005	Winter Solstice	Mr. Bricker	
2005	Pretty Persuasion	Mr. Anderson	
2006	Relative Strangers	Richard Clayton	
2006	Holly	Patrick	
2007	Music Within	Richard Pimentel	
2009	The Time Traveler's Wife	Gomez	
2010	Dinner for Schmucks	Caldwell	
2010	Going the Distance	Will Broderick	
2011	10 Years	Paul	
2012	Queens of Country	Rance McCoy	
2012	The Odd Life of Timothy Green	Franklin Crudstaff	
2012	Game Change	Mark Wallace	Television movie
2013	Touchy Feely	Adrian	
2013	Drinking Buddies	Chris	
2013	The Pretty One	Charles	
2013	The Conjuring	Roger Perron	Nominated – Fright Meter Award for Best Supporting Actor
2013	Parkland	James Hosty	
2014	Fort Bliss	Richard	
2015	James White	Ben	
2015	The End of the Tour	Bob Levin	
2015	Addicted to Fresno	Edwin	
2015	Vacation	Ethan	
2015	Digging for Fire	Bob	
2016	The 5th Wave	Oliver Sullivan	
2016	Shangri-La Suite	Elvis	
2017	Shimmer Lake	Kyle Walker	
2017	Lucky	Bobby Lawrence	
2018	Tully	Drew / husband	
2018	The Long Dumb Road	Francois	
2018	The Professor	Henry	
2018	The Man Who Killed Hitler and Then the Bigfoot	Flag Pin	
2020	Holly Slept Over	Peter	
2021	The Tender Bar	Future JR	Voice
2021	The Same Storm	Jim Lamson / Ben's Dad	
2022	The Estate	James	
2023	The Flash	Henry Allen	
2023	Sitting in Bars with Cake	Fred	
2023	The Featherweight	Bob Kaplan	
2026	Killing Castro	TBA	
2026	Christmas at the Kringles	Mark Severson	

Key
†	Denotes works that have not yet been released

=== Television ===
Year	Title	Role	Notes
1995	JAG	Corporal David Anderson	Episode: "Scimitar"
1996	Townies	Kurt Pettiglio	Series Regular
1997	Timecop	Eliot Ness	Episode: "Public Enemy"
1997	Players	Jordan	Episode: "Con Law"
1998	That's Life	Mitch	6 episodes
2000	Then Came You	Max	Episode: "Then Came Cousin Aidan"
2001	Band of Brothers	Lewis Nixon	Miniseries; 10 episodes Nominated – Golden Globe Award for Best Supporting Actor – Series, Miniseries or Television Film
2001–2002	The Practice	A.D.A. Alan Lowe	8 episodes
2002–2003	Sex and the City	Jack Berger	8 episodes
2005–2007	American Dad!	Bob Memari	Voice, 3 episodes
2005	House	Dr. Sebastian Charles	Episode: "TB or Not TB"
2006	Family Guy	Video Store Clerk	Voice, episode: "Stewie B. Goode"
2006	Nightmares & Dreamscapes: From the Stories of Stephen King	Howard Fornoy	Episode: "The End of the Whole Mess"
2006–2007	Standoff	Matt Flannery	18 episodes
2009	Defying Gravity	Maddux Donner	1 season
2009	WWII in HD	Charles Scheffel	Voice, 5 episodes
2011	Issues	The Nothing	
2013	Boardwalk Empire	Roy Phillips	6 episodes Nominated – Screen Actors Guild Award for Outstanding Performance by an Ensemble in a Drama Series
2015	Adventure Time	Morty Rogers	Voice, episode: "Chips & Ice Cream"
2015	Saints & Strangers	John Carver	Miniseries, 2 episodes
2016–2021	Search Party	Keith	12 episodes
2017	Dice	Sydney Stein	2 episodes
2017	Kings of Con	Lyle	1 episode
2017–2020	Loudermilk	Sam Loudermilk	lead role, 3 seasons
2018–2023	A Million Little Things	Jonathan Dixon	recurring role
2018	The Romanoffs	Alex Myers	Episode: "Bright and High Circle"
2021	Creepshow	Mac Kamen	Voice, episode: "The Things in Oakwood's Past"
2022–2023	Pantheon	Dr. Peter Waxman	Voice, 16 episodes
