= Gia Walsh =

American film producer

Gia Walsh (née Laspagnoletta; born December 7, 1967) is an American film producer and co-founder of the eponymous New York City based production company, GiGi Films.

== Early life and education ==
Raised in Bronxville, New York, she graduated from Manhattanville University in 1989. She became interested in working in film after enrolling in Ralph Appelbaum's Filmmaker's Dialogue course at the School of Visual Arts in New York City.

== Career ==
Under Walsh's supervision and creative guidance, GiGi Films has brought award-winning movies to the screen. Walsh's films have received both film festival nominations and industry recognition. Walsh's production of Zola is thought to be the first film inspired entirely by a Twitter feed.

In 2022, Walsh and Gigi Films produced 'Zola'. 'Zola' earned seven nominations at the Independent Spirit Awards where it won Best Editing and Best Female Lead. 'Zola' received The Creative Impact Award at the Palm Springs International Film Festival, The Black Critics Film Circle Award and the 2021 Women Film Critic Circle Award. Walsh produced 'American Murderer' in 2022, which premiered at the Taormina Film Festival where it was nominated for the Cariddi D'Oro Award. It received The Artistic Directors Award in 2022 at The San Diego Film Festival and Tom Pelphrey won Best Actor Award at the Boston Film Festival. 'Allswell in New York', also produced by Walsh, won Best Screenplay in a US Narrative Feature at the Tribeca Film Festival in 2022. In 2016, Walsh and GiGi Films produced the drama '11:55' .'11:55' won The Aspen Film Festival Audience Award and the 2017 Altered States Audience Award at The River Run Film Festival.

== Filmography ==
Walsh's filmography includes;'The Winning Season'(2009), 'The Art of Getting By'(2011),'Burn Country'(2016), '11:55'(2016),'Zola'(2020), 'Allswell in New York' (2022)'American Murderer' (2022) and 'Cabin Girl' (2023). 'Allswell In New York' debuted at the Tribeca Film Festival in 2022. 'Allswell In New York' won Best Feature Film in 2022 at the 8th Annual Official Latino Film and Arts Festival. GiGi Films' 'Zola' premiered at The Sundance Film Festival in 2020 where it was nominated for the Grand Jury Prize for Best U.S. Picture. Burn Country premiered at the Tribeca Film Festival in 2016 and Dominic Raines won the Best Actor Award. Walsh's first film as a producer,'The Winning Season' with Sam Rockwell, Emma Roberts and Rooney Mara, premiered at The Sundance Film Festival in 2009.

Filmography
Year	Film	Credit
2009	The Winning Season	producer
2011	The Art of Getting By	producer
2016	Burn Country	executive producer
2016	11:55	producer
2020	Zola	producer
2022	Allswell In New York	producer
2022	American Murderer	producer
2023	Cabin Girl	producer
