= Turn Me On (film) =

American film by Michael Tyburski

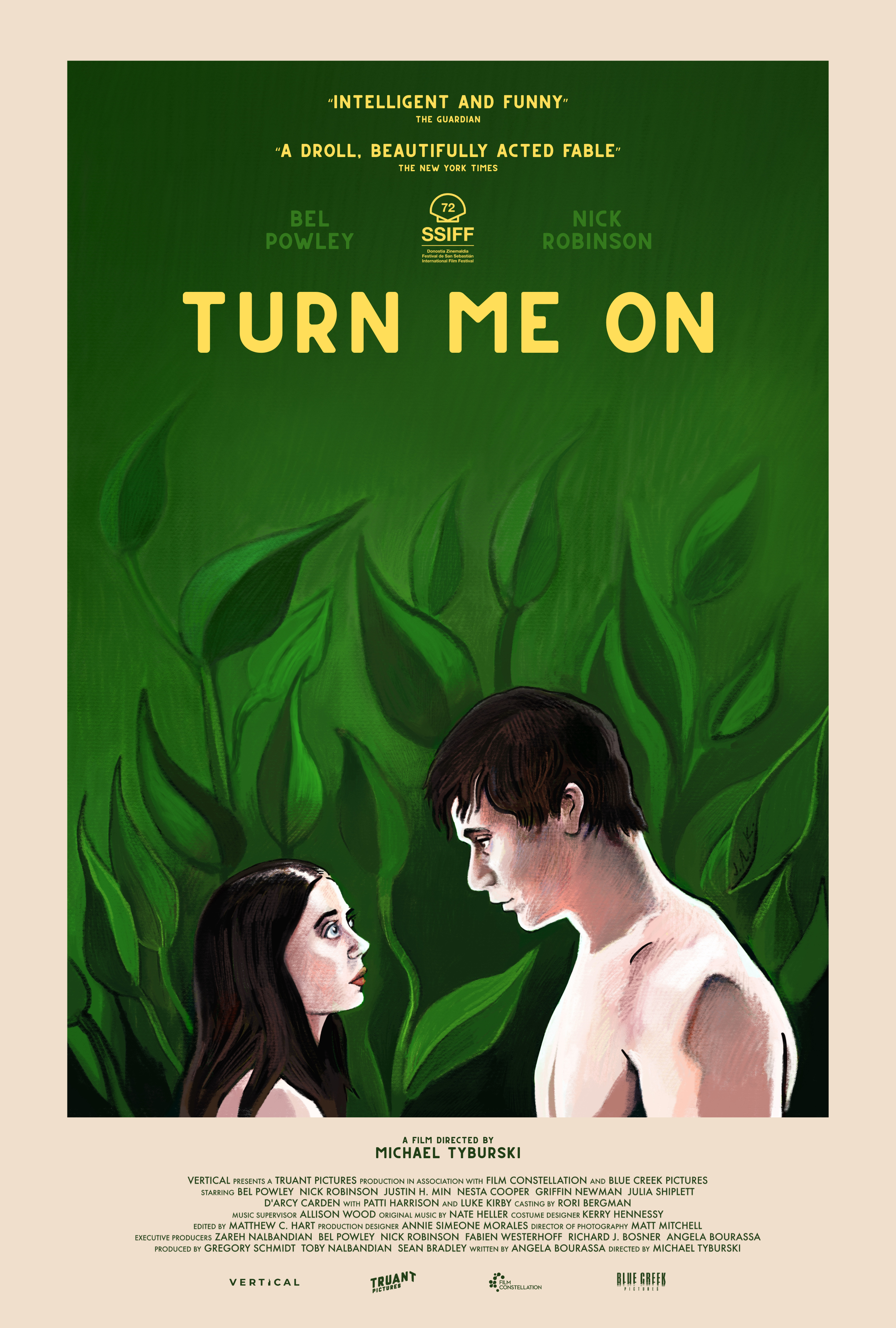
- Alternative poster artwork
- Directed by: Michael Tyburski
- Written by: Angela Bourassa
- Produced by: Toby Nalbandian; Gregory Schmidt; Sean Bradley
- Starring: Bel Powley; Nick Robinson
- Cinematography: Matt Mitchell
- Edited by: Matthew C. Hart
- Production company: Truant Pictures
- Distributed by: Vertical
- Release dates: September 24, 2024 (Zinemaldia); January 10, 2025 (United States)
- Country: United States
- Language: English

Turn Me On is a 2024 American dystopian romantic comedy film directed by Michael Tyburski and written by Angela Bourassa. It stars Bel Powley and Nick Robinson.

== Synopsis ==
In the near future, a regime-imposed daily vitamin has eradicated human emotion, but two young lovers skip their daily dose, after Joy (Bel Powley) has to take a different pill one day for a cancer treatment. After not taking the mandated blue-white pill, she starts to experience feelings and noting her surrounds, which are new sensations. Their world was otherwise bland and formulaic.

She encourages her assigned partner, William (Nick Robinson), to not take his mandated pill the next day, and together they explore the sensations. On an overnight outing with two other couples, the mandated pills are not accessible, and they too learn of a previously unknown awareness. Conflict starts occurring as the individuals become more self-aware and experiencing new emotions including jealousy. The individuals and together as couples questioned whether the routine and disassociation was preferred over handling interactions.

During this time Joy speaks with a neighbour who had ceased taking her mandated pill but pretended to conform within the society.

Because of her new-found awareness, and choices in her decisions, Joy is removed from the group and meets with a member of the observers, where she becomes aware the cancer treatment pill requirement was really a way to start her self-awareness and see how she responded to the emotions. She is then prepared to become an observer; but she also makes some free will choices.

The government or regime controllers were just referred to as 'Our Friends'.

== Cast ==
- Bel Powley as Joy
- Nick Robinson as William
- Justin H. Min as Christopher
- D'Arcy Carden as The Woman in a Suit
- Nesta Cooper as Samantha
- Griffin Newman as Frank
- Luke Kirby as Founder
- Patti Harrison as Morgan
- Julia Shiplett as Michelle
- Ava Eisenson as Doctor

== Production ==
Turn Me On was produced by Toby Nalbandian and Gregory Schmidt of Truant Pictures, alongside Sean Bradley. Bel Powley and Nick Robinson were cast in the lead roles in February 2022. Principal photography was scheduled to begin in November 2022, and had wrapped by mid-May 2023.

== Release ==
At the 2022 Cannes Film Festival it was reported that IFC Films had acquired North American distribution rights to the film. However, in September 2024, it was announced that Vertical had taken over North American rights instead, planning to release it sometime in early 2025. The film made it to the 'New Directors' lineup of the 72nd San Sebastián International Film Festival on September 24, 2024.
