= Beauty of the Father =

2004 Play by Nilo Cruz

- Written by: Nilo Cruz
- Original language: English
- Setting: 1998, Salobrena, Granada

Premiere
- Date premiered: January 3, 2004
- Place premiered: The New Theatre, Coral Gables, Florida

Beauty of the Father is a 2004 play by the Cuban-American playwright Nilo Cruz. It premiered at the New Theatre in Coral Gables, Florida, and has been performed at the Manhattan Theatre Club in New York City.

== Synopsis ==
In the summer of 1998, the estranged daughter of a painter attempts to rekindle her relationship with her father after ten years of not seeing each other. While the two are rebuilding their bond, they both fall in love with the same person. With the assistance of the ghost of Federico Gracia Lorca, the father must come to terms with his homosexuality and being a father.

== Characters ==
Note: the descriptions of the characters come from the script.

- Marina, a young woman of twenty-five
- Emiliano, a man in his mid-forties, early fifties
- Paquita, a woman in her late forties, early fifties
- Karim, a young man of twenty-five
- Federico Gracia Lorca, the thirty-eight-year-old poet as a ghost, dressed in a white suit

== Reception ==
David Rooney of Variety described Cruz's language as the "words and metaphors flow like the vino tinto being liberally consumed by the characters or the waves that caress the beach." Hilton Als of The New Yorker wrote: "Beauty of the Father" brings to mind two other Cuban writers ...the late novelist and essayist Guillermo Cabrera Infante and the playwright Maria Irene Fornes. Like his artistic forebears, Cruz recognizes the magic in the everyday. And he has found an astonishing language with which to describe it."

Michael Feingold of The Village Voice wrote: "the play itself is unhelpable...It sets up a predictably disastrous situation and moves directly to the disaster without bothering to convince us there was any interesting reason to see it happen." The Backstage East reviewer, David Rosenberg, said, "Long on atmosphere but short on drama, the Manhattan Theatre Club production at City Center seems most concerned with literary conceits."
