= Most Likely to Murder =

2018 American comedy film

- Official release poster
- Directed by: Dan Gregor
- Written by: Dan Gregor; Doug Mand
- Produced by: Rachel Bloom; Pete Ahmann; Adam Pally
- Starring: Adam Pally; Rachel Bloom; Vincent Kartheiser; John Reynolds; Doug Mand
- Cinematography: Charlie Gruet
- Edited by: Mollie Goldstein
- Music by: Mark Henry Phillips
- Production companies: Gregor & Mand Schmuck Bait Productions; Washington Square Films
- Distributed by: Lionsgate
- Release dates: March 12, 2018 (SXSW); May 1, 2018 (United States)
- Running time: 90 minutes
- Country: United States
- Language: English

Most Likely to Murder is a 2018 American comedy film, directed by Dan Gregor, from a screenplay by Gregor and Doug Mand. It stars Adam Pally, Rachel Bloom, Vincent Kartheiser, John Reynolds and Doug Mand.

The film had its world premiere at South by Southwest on March 12, 2018. It was released through video on demand on May 1, 2018, by Lionsgate.

== Plot ==
Billy Green, who was known as the King of Valley Stream (New York) among his peers in high school, is now kind of a loser, after peaking in high school. While he works as a restroom attendant in a Las Vegas nightclub, he tells everyone back home that he is a club investor, hobnobbing with the rich and famous who frequent the club. He has to go home to Valley Stream for Thanksgiving weekend to collect all his belongings from his parents' house before they move to Santa Fe. While there, he hopes to reconnect with his high school girlfriend Kara Doblowski if only to make him feel like "The King" once again. If not, he, as solace, still has the hidden but somewhat known video tape, at least among the male members of his peer group, of the kinky things he did with Elana Perkins née Duncan, she now married to VSPD Lt. Jason Perkins, one of their classmates who also knows about the tape. Billy quickly learns that nothing will happen with Kara, who has grown up and is dating Lowell Shapiro, now a pharmacist but who was seen back then as the weirdo among their class. Despite the Shapiros long having lived across the street from the Greens, Billy did not associate with him. Seeing some activity at the Shapiro house in the middle of the night followed by the body of Lowell's dead mother being transported away the next morning eventually leads to Billy's belief that Lowell murdered his mother as there was always rumors that he was abused by his parents growing up. With the help of Billy's somewhat clueless best friend Duane Douscher, Billy goes on a search for evidence to support his theory. It may not be clear in Billy's own mind if he truly does believe it and is trying to protect Kara, or if it is solely a way to get back together with Kara in being her knight in shining armor.

== Cast ==
- Adam Pally as Billy Green
- Rachel Bloom as Kara Doblowski
- Vincent Kartheiser as Lowell Shapiro
- John Reynolds as Jason Perkins
- Doug Mand as Duane Douscher
- Julia Goldani Telles as Tami Douscher
- Billy Eichner as Spiegel
- Hasan Minhaj as Amir
- Didi Conn as Fran Green
- Ethan Phillips as Bobby Green
- Constance Shulman as Norma Shapiro
- Michael Kostroff as Uncle Fred
- Rebecca Naomi Jones as Elena Perkins
- John Lutz as Corey
- Tami Sagher as Nervous Women
- Mary Testa as Mrs. Lipman
- Jim Santangeli as Behar
- Gary Richardson as Rooney

== Production ==
In February 2017, it was announced Adam Pally and Rachel Bloom had been cast in the film, with Dan Gregor directing from a screenplay he wrote alongside Doug Mand. Pally, Bloom, and Petra Ahmann will serve as producers on the film, while Gregor and Mand will serve as executive producers. Lionsgate will distribute the film. In March 2017, Vincent Kartheiser, John Reynolds, Didi Conn, Ethan Phillips, John Lutz, Hasan Minhaj, Julia Goldani Telles, Jim Santangeli and Gary Richardson joined the cast of the film.

== Release ==
The film had its world premiere at South by Southwest on March 12, 2018. It was released through video on demand on May 1, 2018.

=== Critical reception ===
Most Likely to Murder received mixed to positive reviews from film critics. It holds a 62% approval rating on review aggregator website Rotten Tomatoes, based on 13 reviews, with an average of 5.9/10.
