= Cryptozoo =

- Theatrical release poster
- Directed by: Dash Shaw
- Written by: Dash Shaw
- Produced by: Kyle Martin; Jane Samborski; Bill Way; Tyler Davidson
- Starring: Lake Bell; Michael Cera; Angeliki Papoulia; Zoe Kazan; Peter Stormare; Grace Zabriskie; Louisa Krause; Thomas Jay Ryan
- Edited by: Lance Edmands; Alex Abrahams
- Music by: John Carroll Kirby
- Production companies: Fit Via Fi; Electro Chinoland; Washington Square Films; Low Spark Films; Cinereach
- Distributed by: Magnolia Pictures
- Release dates: January 29, 2021 (Sundance); August 20, 2021 (United States)
- Running time: 95 minutes
- Country: United States
- Language: English
- Box office: $37,883

Cryptozoo is a 2021 American adult animated drama film written and directed by Dash Shaw. It features an ensemble cast of Lake Bell, Michael Cera, Angeliki Papoulia, Zoe Kazan, Peter Stormare, Grace Zabriskie, Louisa Krause and Thomas Jay Ryan. The film had its world premiere at the Sundance Film Festival on January 29, 2021, and was released by Magnolia Pictures in the United States on August 20, 2021.

== Plot ==
In the 1960s San Francisco, after having sex in the forest, a young couple, Matthew and Amber, stumble across an enclosure. Climbing inside, they are shocked to discover a unicorn, which becomes provoked and stabs Matthew to death. The unicorn then trips and breaks its leg, leading Amber to bludgeon it to death with a rock. Trying to escape the next morning, Amber discovers the place is a zoo for cryptids named Cryptozoo.

One of the cryptozoologists that works there is Lauren Grey, who has dedicated her life to rescuing cryptids from the black market after a Baku named Mariko cleansed her of nightmares when she was a child in American camps in World War II, and thus has spent much of her time away from Cryptozoo. While on a mission to rescue an alkonost from peasants with the help of a lecherous faun named Gustav, the alkonost is suddenly taken away by Nicholas, a veteran and cruel cryptid trafficker who sells them to the United States military as bioweapons in the Vietnam War. Lauren is rescued by the zoo's owner and her mentor, Joan, who reveals that Mariko, who had previously been trafficked to America, has appeared after fleeing, and convinces her to team up with a gorgon, Phoebe, to find her, as the Johnson administration seeks to use the Baku to devour the aspirations of the counterculture movement. Phoebe is also engaged to a human, Jay, who knows of her identity.

The group tracks a lead to Orlando, where they find and take a headless man named Pliny, along with the woman who raised him, back to Cryptozoo. Lauren shows them and Phoebe around Cryptozoo, but while Pliny loves it, Phoebe is put off by it and wishes for cryptids to be accepted everywhere. After settling in, Pliny reveals that he saw Mariko in Maysville, Kentucky with a "black cat". Traveling there, Lauren and Phoebe discover Nicholas is also after the Baku. After unsuccessfully searching a gentleman's club called the Black Kitty Cat and talking with a cat lady, they come to a tarot shop with a black cat logo. While giving Lauren a reading, the shop owner realizes they are here for Mariko and reveals she is in a room in the back. They are about to take her, but Nicholas' men arrive and capture Lauren, Phoebe, and Mariko after being tipped off by Gustav.

Nicholas takes them to Cryptozoo, intending to use the evidence to attack and capture all the cryptids there. When they arrive, however, the cryptids have all been released from their enclosures, and they begin attacking Nicholas' men, causing the helicopter with Mariko inside to crash. In the commotion, Lauren escapes and manages to commandeer a griffin, which proceeds to knock the helicopter carrying Nicholas, Gustav, and Phoebe into the kraken pool. Lauren rescues Phoebe, but Nicholas recaptures Mariko. Gustav successfully pleads for their lives, and the survivors flee from a camoodi into a Karzełek cave.

There they discover Amber, accompanied by the last known Pegasus and having buried Matthew. Amber reveals that she was the one who released the cryptids, in an attempt to free them from their suffering. The cryptids proceeded to attack Amber, but the Pegasus flew her and Matthew's body to safety. Seeing Joan's office under attack, Lauren hops on the Pegasus to fly over to save her, with Gustav getting killed by Nicholas while giving her a window to escape. Lauren finds a weary Joan with her ape-like cryptid lover Vaughn, only for the camoodi to crush the office; Lauren escapes on the Pegasus. Finding Joan, Lauren mournfully concludes that they needed the cryptids more than the cryptids needed them, and Joan, unable to accept this, dies.

The Karzełek attack Nicholas and his men, allowing Amber and Phoebe to flee. Phoebe comes up with a plan to use Luz Mala to escort the cryptids safely out of the park. With Pliny's help, they find them just as Nicholas escapes and finds Mariko. He tries to capture her, but Mariko feeds off his dreams, killing him. Amber and Phoebe break out the Luz Mala using the unicorn's severed horn, and the Luz Mala escorts the cryptids out of the park, saving them and all the humans present. On her way out, Mariko encounters Lauren, who chooses to let her go.

Lauren chooses to become a regular veterinarian, with one of her clients being Amber, who has bought a dog in Matthew's honor. After Joan's funeral, Lauren attends Phoebe and Jay's wedding. While fishing in a nearby river, she notices Mariko swimming among the fish and watches the sunset, which Pliny also watches.

== Cast ==
- Lake Bell as Lauren Grey, a veterinarian cryptozoologist who works at the Cryptozoo, and the main protagonist.
- Michael Cera as Matthew
- Angeliki Papoulia as Phoebe, a gorgon.
- Zoe Kazan as Magdalene
- Peter Stormare as Gustav, a faun.
- Grace Zabriskie as Joan, the owner of the Cryptozoo and Lauren Grey's mentor.
- Louisa Krause as Amber
- Thomas Jay Ryan as Nicholas, a cryptid-hating cryptid trafficker, and the main antagonist.
- Alex Karpovsky as David

== Release and reception ==
The film had its world premiere at the Sundance Film Festival on January 29, 2021 and won the Innovator Award. Shortly after, Magnolia Pictures acquired U.S. distribution rights to the film and set it for an August 20, 2021 release in the United States. The film also screened at the 71st Berlin International Film Festival in March 2021.

Cryptozoo holds a 72% approval rating on review aggregator website Rotten Tomatoes, based on 89 reviews, with an average rating of 5.80/10. The site's critical consensus reads, "Although its visual overstimulation threatens to derail its themes, Cryptozoo is an ambitious and unique critique of capitalistic values." On Metacritic, the film holds a rating of 74 out of 100, based on 22 critics, indicating "generally favorable" reviews.

Jessica Kiang of Variety wrote: "In this zoo, the story may be tame, but the images, and the imagination that releases them, run wild."

It was also nominated for the John Cassavetes Award at the 37th Independent Spirit Awards and received a Special Mention by the Jury at the Neuchâtel International Fantastic Film Festival.
