= The Sound of Silence (2019 film) =

2019 film

- Theatrical release poster
- Directed by: Michael Tyburski
- Screenplay by: Ben Nabors; Michael Tyburski
- Story by: Ben Nabors
- Produced by: Adi Ezroni; Tariq Merhab; Ben Nabors; Michael Prall; Charlie Scully; Mandy Tagger
- Starring: Peter Sarsgaard; Rashida Jones; Tony Revolori; Austin Pendleton
- Cinematography: Eric Lin
- Edited by: Matthew C. Hart
- Music by: Will Bates
- Production companies: Anonymous Content; Feracious Entertainment; Group Theory; Jhumka Films; Keshet Studios; Valparaiso Pictures; Washington Square Films
- Distributed by: IFC Films
- Release dates: January 26, 2019 (Sundance); September 13, 2019 (United States)
- Running time: 85 minutes
- Country: United States
- Language: English
- Box office: $20,171

The Sound of Silence is a 2019 American drama film directed by Michael Tyburski. It was screened in the U.S. Dramatic Competition section at the 2019 Sundance Film Festival. The plot centers on Peter Lucian, played by Peter Sarsgaard, a "house tuner," working on the sonic environment of homes. It is based on the director's 2013 short film "Palimpsest". It was released on September 13, 2019, by IFC Films.

== Cast ==
- Rashida Jones as Ellen Chasen
- Peter Sarsgaard as Peter Lucian
- Tony Revolori as Samuel Diaz
- Austin Pendleton as Robert Feinway
- Kate Lyn Sheil as Nancy
- Alex Karpovsky as Landon
- Bruce Altman as Harold Carlyle
- Tina Benko as Dr. Elizabeth Brookings
- Alison Fraser as Denise Feinway
