= 11:55 =

2016 film directed by Dan Trachtenberg and Ben Snyder

- Directed by: Ari Issler; Ben Snyder
- Written by: Ari Issler; Ben Snyder; Victor Almanzar
- Produced by: Kara Baker; Joshua Blum; Ari Issler; Danny Mendoza; Ben Snyder; Matthew Thurm; Gia Walsh
- Starring: Victor Almanzar; Shirley Rumierk; Goya Robles; Elizabeth Rodriguez; David Zayas; Mike Carlsen; John Leguizamo; Julia Stiles
- Cinematography: Tim Gillis
- Edited by: Ray Hubley
- Production companies: Gigi Films; Gigi Productions; Washington Square Films
- Distributed by: Gravitas Ventures
- Release dates: 5 June 2016 (Los Angeles); 9 June 2017 (United States)
- Running time: 80 minutes
- Country: United States
- Language: English

11:55 is a 2016 American drama film directed by Ari Issler and Ben Snyder. It was written by Issler, Snyder, and Victor Almanzar and stars Almanzar, Shirley Rumierk, Goya Robles, Elizabeth Rodriguez, David Zayas, Mike Carlsen, John Leguizamo, and Julia Stiles.

== Plot ==
U.S. Marine Nelson Sanchez leaves his home after being involved in the death of a drug dealer. Years later, he comes back to his old neighborhood, who celebrates his return. The late drug dealer's brother hears about Nelson's return and vows to get revenge.

== Cast ==
- Victor Almanzar as Nelson Sanchez
- Shirley Rumierk as Livvy
- Elizabeth Rodriguez as Angie
- Robin de Jesús as Rubio
- Mike Carlsen as Nicky Quinn
- Goya Robles as Teyo
- Dominic Colón as Cezar
- John Leguizamo as Berto
- Smarlin Hernandez as Daiza
- Kareem Savinon as Kade
- Johnny Rivera as Fresh

== Release ==
11:55 premiered at the Los Angeles International Film Festival as part of the U.S. Fiction Competition. It played at the Seattle Film Festival, Woodstock Film Festival, Austin Film Festival, Napa Film Festival, Milwaukee Film Festival, and Woods Hole Film Festival.

11:55 was released in theaters by Gravitas Ventures and made on demand June 9, 2017. It was released on Blu-ray and DVD August 8, 2017.

== Reception ==
The film has a critics' rating of 100% based on 5 reviews on Rotten Tomatoes. The film won Audience Awards at the Aspen Film Festival (tied with My Blind Brother) and the RiverRun Film Festival.
