= Save Yourselves! =

2020 American science fiction comedy film

- Official poster
- Directed by: Alex Huston Fischer; Eleanor Wilson
- Written by: Alex Huston Fischer; Eleanor Wilson
- Produced by: Kara Durrett; Mandy Tagger; Adi Ezroni
- Starring: John Paul Reynolds; Sunita Mani
- Cinematography: Matt Clegg
- Edited by: Sofi Marshall
- Music by: Andrew Orkin
- Production companies: Keshet Studios; Washington Square Films; Last Rodeo Studios
- Distributed by: Bleecker Street
- Release dates: January 25, 2020 (Sundance); October 2, 2020 (United States)
- Running time: 93 minutes
- Country: United States
- Language: English
- Box office: $301,162

Save Yourselves! is a 2020 American science fiction comedy film written and directed by Alex Huston Fischer and Eleanor Wilson, and starring John Paul Reynolds and Sunita Mani. The film premiered at the 2020 Sundance Film Festival. It was released on October 2, 2020, by Bleecker Street.

== Plot ==
Su and Jack, a 30-something millennial couple, decide to disconnect from their internet-dominated lives in Brooklyn by turning off their phones for a week and staying at a remote cabin owned by their friend Raph. During their stay, Jack notices a fuzzy ball-like object in the den, which Su calls a "pouffe". While Jack is outside, Su secretly turns on her phone and listens to several strange voicemails from her mother about "giant rats" infesting New York City, which seem to consume ethanol. After a night of drinking, while the couple make love in front of a large window, Raph arrives outside the cabin but falls to the ground, revealing a "pouffe" behind him.

The couple awaken to find that Jack's sourdough starter is empty and their bottle of whiskey has been drained. Su realizes that both contained ethanol and that the "pouffe" may be one of the giant rats her mother spoke of. The couple hide upstairs and turn on their phones, finding they've lost signal but learning from various voicemails and texts that the "pouffes" are aliens which feed on ethanol, and that they have invaded New York, forcing an emergency evacuation. Preparing to escape back to the city, the couple find that the aliens have drained their car's gasoline due to its ethanol content. They find a Land Rover in the barn with a full tank of diesel fuel, which the aliens ignore because it contains no ethanol.

Driving through the woods, they witness another couple being killed by an alien. Recalling the alien's attraction to alcohol, Jack throws a bottle of wine into the woods to lure the alien. The scent of ethanol distracts the alien, which sprays a pheromone and hovers into the forest, clearing their path. Su and Jack hear a baby crying in the other couple's truck and begrudgingly go back to rescue it. A woman hiding in the back of the truck emerges and holds them at gunpoint before driving off in the Land Rover, leaving the couple and the baby stranded in the woods. When the couple begin hallucinating due to the alien's pheromones, Su injects Jack and herself with two needles of epinephrine from the truck, but they lose consciousness.

They wake to find an alien near the baby, who crawled away while they were unconscious. When the alien shoots its proboscis at Jack’s chest, Su grabs a knife and cuts it off, which deflates and kills the alien. They discover that Jack's cell phone, stored in his breast pocket, saved him from the alien attack. While climbing to a lookout point, they investigate a translucent structure growing out of the ground nearby. On discovering that their phones have regained signal, they check for information and call 911. While they are distracted, the structure changes shape to trap them and the baby inside a sound-proof bubble, which gradually ascends beyond the atmosphere, joining many other bubbles also rising into space from all over the Earth.

== Cast ==
- John Paul Reynolds as Jack "Jackie" Wyndam
- Sunita Mani as Surina "Su" Raji
- Ben Sinclair as Raph
- John Early as Blake
- Jo Firestone as Desi
- Johanna Day as Judy
- Amy Sedaris as the voice of Jack's mother
- Zenobia Shroff as the voice of Su's mother

== Release ==
The film had its world premiere at the Sundance Film Festival on January 25, 2020. Shortly after, Bleecker Street acquired distribution rights to the film. It was released on October 2, 2020, and is available on Hulu in the United States.

== Television series ==
A television series adaptation of the film for Hulu is in the works at Keshet Studios and Universal Television.

== Critical reception ==
Save Yourselves holds an 89% approval rating on review aggregator website Rotten Tomatoes, based on 91 reviews, with an average of 6.7/10. The site's critical consensus reads, "Save Yourselves! doesn't do anything unexpected with its one-joke premise -- but fortunately, that one joke turns out to be consistently funny anyway." Metacritic, which uses a weighted average, assigned the film a score of 67 out of 100, based on 15 critics, indicating "generally favorable" reviews. Stephanie Zacharek from Time magazine praised the film, saying, "It takes itself just seriously enough, but not too seriously."
