= Allswell in New York =

- Theatrical release poster
- Directed by: Ben Snyder
- Written by: Liza Colón-Zayas; Elizabeth Rodriguez; Daphne Rubin-Vega
- Produced by: Ari Issler; Paul Jarrett; Gia Walsh; Elizabeth Rodriguez
- Starring: Liza Colón-Zayas; Elizabeth Rodriguez; Daphne Rubin-Vega
- Cinematography: Oren Soffer
- Edited by: Ray Hubley
- Music by: Melissa McGregor
- Production companies: Gigi Films; Filmopoly; Monarch Partners; Washington Square Films
- Distributed by: Freestyle Digital Media
- Release dates: June 13, 2022 (Tribeca); October 18, 2024 (United States)
- Running time: 89 minutes
- Country: United States
- Language: English

Allswell in New York is a 2022 American comedy-drama film directed by Ben Snyder, starring Liza Colón-Zayas, Elizabeth Rodriguez and Daphne Rubin-Vega. It premiered at the Tribeca Film Festival on June 13, 2022 and will be released theatrically in the United States on October 18, 2024.

== Premise ==
Three Nuyorican sisters navigate the daunting life challenges of single motherhood, career, and family, all while finding humor and solace within the bond of sisterhood.

== Cast ==
- Liza Colón-Zayas as Ida
- Elizabeth Rodriguez as Daisy
- Daphne Rubin-Vega as Serene
- Mackenzie Lansing as Nina
- Michael Rispoli as Ray
- J. Cameron Barnett as Clint
- Shyrley Rodriguez as Constance
- Felix Solis as Desmond
- Bobby Cannavale as Gabe
- Max Casella as Tim
- Brian Wolfe as Gunner

== Release ==
The film premiered at the Tribeca Film Festival under its original title Allswell on June 13, 2022, where it won the award for Best Screenplay. Freestyle Digital Media acquired the film's North American distribution rights on August 21, 2024 and released the film on October 18, 2024 in theaters and all cable, satellite, and digital platforms.

== Reception ==
On the review aggregator website Rotten Tomatoes, 88% of 16 critics' reviews are positive, with an average rating of 5.7/10. Metacritic, which uses a weighted average, assigned the film a score of 62 out of 100, based on 7 critics, indicating "generally favorable" reviews.

William Bibbiani of TheWrap wrote that the film is "full of love and meaning while engaging, directly, with the failings of the film's characters." Mae Abdulbaki of Screen Rant wrote that while the film "could have certainly expanded on the character dynamics a bit more", it is "engaging and well-handled overall".

Sumner Forbes of Film Threat gave the film a score of 6 out of 10. Kristen Lopez of IndieWire gave the film a grade of "C" and wrote that the film "feels like a Lifetime series pilot, with the women adhering to one stereotype each", and that "These aren't characters reconciling with their past; it's three disparate characters forced to be in one movie."
