= Dash Shaw =

American comic book writer/artist and animator

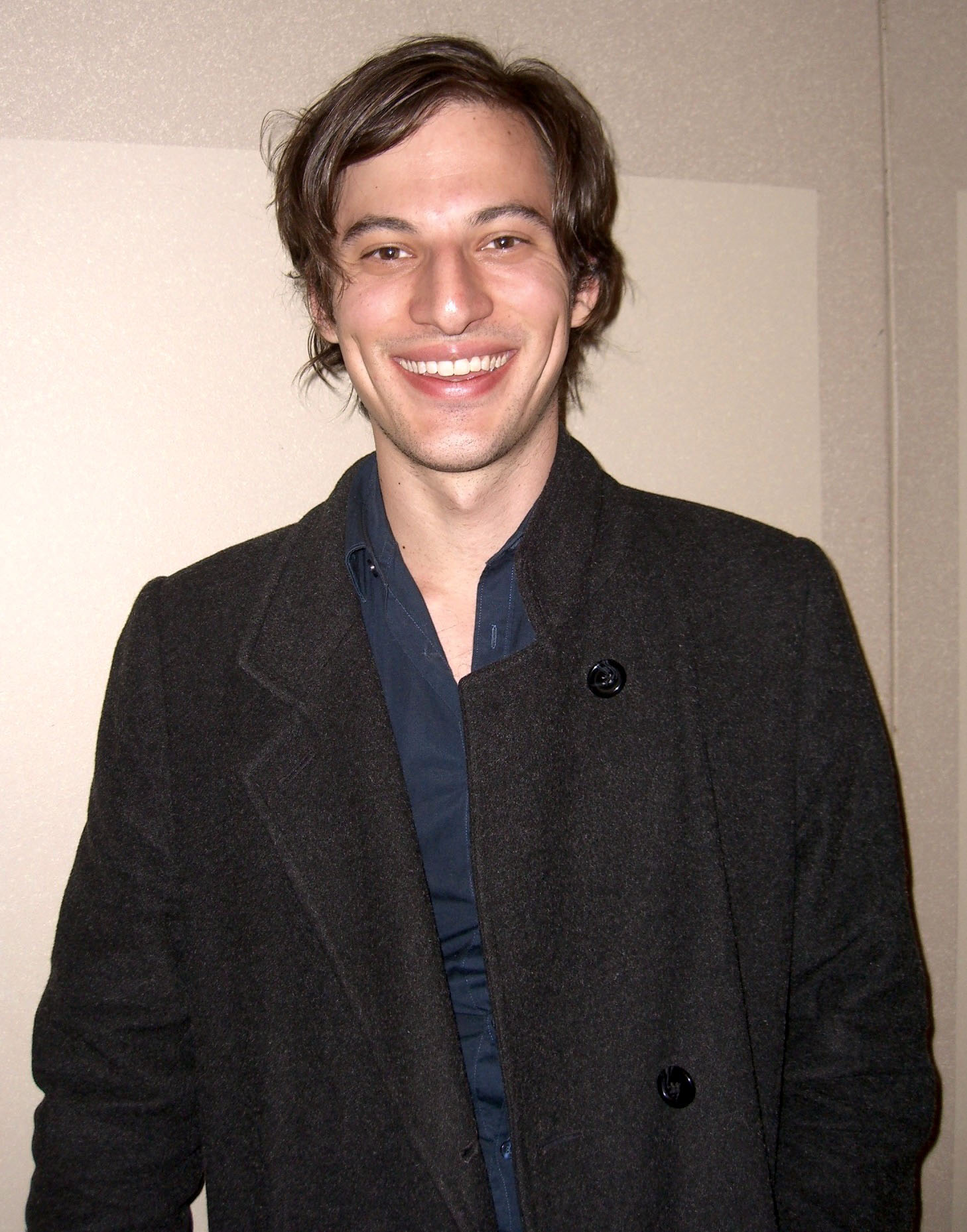
- Shaw at the New York Comic Con in Manhattan, October 8, 2010
- Born: April 6, 1983 (age 43) Hollywood, California
- Notable works: Bottomless Belly Button; BodyWorld; Cryptozoo

Dash Shaw (born April 6, 1983) is an American comic book writer/artist and animator. He is the author of the graphic novels Cosplayers, Doctors, New School, and Bottomless Belly Button, published by Fantagraphics. Additionally, Shaw has written Love Eats Brains published by Odd God Press, GardenHead published by Meathaus, The Mother's Mouth published by Alternative Comics, and BodyWorld published by Pantheon Books.

Shaw's comic short stories have appeared in many different anthologies, newspapers and magazines. His square-sized short stories were collected in the 2005 book GoddessHead published by Hidden Agenda Press. His comics are known for their emphasis on emotional, lyrical logic and innovative design. He was named one of the top ten artists to check out at the 2002 "Small Press Expo" when he was 19 years old. He also writes lyrics and plays with James Blanca in the weirdo pop band Love Eats Brains! and has co-written and acted in various short film projects.

Shaw is the director of the animated features My Entire High School Sinking into the Sea (2016) and Cryptozoo (2021).

== Early life ==
Shaw credits his father as an inspiration, saying they made comics together before he could read. His father wrote the text and Dash did the illustrations. During high school, Shaw was the lead illustrator for the Richmond Times-Dispatch's teen section. After they discontinued that section of the newspaper, Shaw started self-publishing mini-comics. He printed the first issue of Love Eats Brains! during his freshman year of college. Shaw studied at the School of Visual Arts in Manhattan, graduating with a BFA in Illustration in 2005.

== Career ==
Throughout college and since, Shaw has published sequential art short stories in a variety of publications in the United States and abroad, plus numerous magazine illustrations.

Shaw's Bottomless Belly Button was published by Fantagraphics in June 2008. His BodyWorld webcomic was bought by Pantheon Books and published in a single printed volume in April 2010.

Bottomless, an exhibition of Shaw's original drawings, storyboards, color background overlays and a new video animation, was on display at Duke University's John Hope Franklin Center from September 25 through October 31, 2008.

In the years following Bottomless Belly Button, Shaw published numerous short stories in comics form, and serialized the science-fiction story BodyWorld on dashshaw.com. It received an Eisner Award nomination for Best Digital Comic in 2009.

Late 2009 saw the release by Fantagraphics of The Unclothed Man In the 35th Century A.D., a collection of short stories that Shaw had previously published in MOME, along with several pages of storyboards and other ephemera from his animated shorts for IFC.

In 2010, Pantheon Books released the collected chapters of BodyWorld in the form of a graphic novel,

In 2013, releases from Shaw included the zine-style mini-comic New Jobs (Uncivilized Books), the comic-book length shorts collection 3 New Stories (Fantagraphics), and Shaw's next graphic novel, New School (Fantagraphics). New School takes place on an island preparing for an influx of English-speaking tourists upon the completion of a massive theme park depicting periods throughout history. It follows two brothers, one who has taken a job teaching English to island locals and another who has come to retrieve his sibling. In the course of the book, both brothers experience alienation from their surroundings and conflicts with the locals. NPR called New School "striking and enigmatic," while Publishers Weekly described the book as "an unusual combination of bildungsroman, travelogue, and intellectual thriller."

Shaw produced the three-part miniseries Clue: Candlestick for IDW comics in 2019.

== Technique and materials ==
Shaw employs a combination of hand drawing, animation techniques and Photoshop to produce his artwork. Shaw started working on acetate sheets while studying at the School of Visual Arts. Pointing to pre-Photoshop comics that were colored via clear celluloid containing the black line art, under which would be placed a board with the painted colors, Shaw explains that he took this process and combined it with animation-style use of celluloid, where the backs of the acetate are painted with gouache and laid over a painted background, in addition to color separations where black line art is used to mark the different colors. In addition to using hand-drawing media such as crow quill pens, colored pencils, and markers, Shaw incorporates collage, Photoshop, and painting directly over photocopies, though he does not work with a separate line art layer, preferring to treat black as simply another color, and not a separate or more important element. On BodyWorld, for example, Shaw did the color separations by hand, used the paint bucket tool in Photoshop to color the shapes, and then printed it out and painted over the photocopy, before scanning it again and making final adjustments in Photoshop to achieve the final art.

Shaw explains that his key motive is combining what he likes about hand drawing with the processes available in Photoshop. He has stated that he does not own a drawing tablet, and that his actual knowledge of Photoshop is limited, compared to most mainstream colorists who rely on it exclusively, explaining, "that coloring leaves me cold."

== Animation ==
His animation influences include Winsor McCay, Osamu Tezuka (in particular his work on Astroboy), and other 60s anime shows like Speed Racer, the 1973 cult films Belladonna of Sadness and Fantastic Planet, limited animation (including A Charlie Brown Christmas), Ralph Bakshi and Suzan Pitt.

Shaw's first animated feature film My Entire High School Sinking Into the Sea had its world premiere at the 2016 Toronto International Film Festival (TIFF) in September 2016 and was also shown at the New York Film Festival (NYFF). It features the voices of Jason Schwartzman, Lena Dunham, Reggie Watts, Maya Rudolph and Susan Sarandon.

He was also responsible for the "comic book" scenes in John Cameron Mitchell's 2010 film Rabbit Hole and the animated dream sequence on an episode of the controversial Netflix series 13 Reasons Why alongside Jane Samborski.

=== Cryptozoo ===
His next feature Cryptozoo, about 1960s San Francisco zookeepers trying to capture a mysterious creature, was released in early 2021 at the Sundance Film Festival where it won the NEXT Innovator Award. It was also nominated for the John Cassavetes Award at the 37th Independent Spirit Awards.

== Works ==
=== Graphic novels ===
- Bottomless Belly Button (Fantagraphics, 2008)
- BodyWorld (Pantheon Books, 2009)
- New School (Fantagraphics, 2013)
- Doctors (Fantagraphics, 2014)
- Cosplayers (Fantagraphics, 2016)
- Clue: Candlestick (IDW Comics, 2019)
- Discipline (New York Review Comics, 2021)
- Blurry (New York Review Comics, 2024)
- Like Swimmers (New York Review Comics, 2026)

=== Comics and story collections ===
- GardenHead (Meathaus, 2002)
- Love Eats Brains! A Zombie Romance (Odd God Press, 2004)
- GoddessHead (Hidden Agenda Press, 2005)
- The Mother's Mouth (Alternative Comics, 2006)
- Virginia (Ça et Là, 2009)
- The Unclothed Man In the 35th Century A.D. (Fantagraphics, 2009)
- "Dr. Strange vs. Nightmare" story in Strange Tales #1 (Marvel, 2009)
- Spider-man story in Strange Tales II #1 (Marvel, 2010)
- New Jobs (Uncivilized Books, 2013)
- 3 New Stories (Fantagraphics, 2013)
- A Cosplayers Christmas (Fantagraphics, 2016)
- Structures 57-66 (Uncivilized Books, 2019)
- Courier (Bomb Magazine, 2024)

=== Covers only ===
- Go-Bots #1 Cover C (IDW Comics, 2018)
- Go-Bots #2 Cover B (IDW Comics, 2018)
- Go-Bots #3 Cover B (IDW Comics, 2018)

=== Short animations ===
- The Unclothed Man in the 35th Century A.D. (IFC.com animated series, 2009)
- Blind Date 4 (2011)
- Wheel of Fortune (2012)
- Seraph (Sigur Rós music video, cowritten with John Cameron Mitchell, 2012)

=== Films ===
- My Entire High School Sinking Into the Sea (2016)
- Cryptozoo (2021)

=== Other work ===
==== As illustrator ====
- Ant Dodger (poems by Bill Knott; self-published, 2024)
- Windy but Nice (poems by Tomaz Salamun; co-published with Black Ocean, 2022)
- The Seasons (poems by Michael Robins; co-published with Robbins, 2021)
- My Beautiful Despair: The Philosophy of Kim Kierkegaardashian (Gallery Books, 2018)

== See also ==
- Arthouse animation
- Art horror
- Alternative comics
- Independent animation
