= Michael Tyburski =

American film director and screenwriter

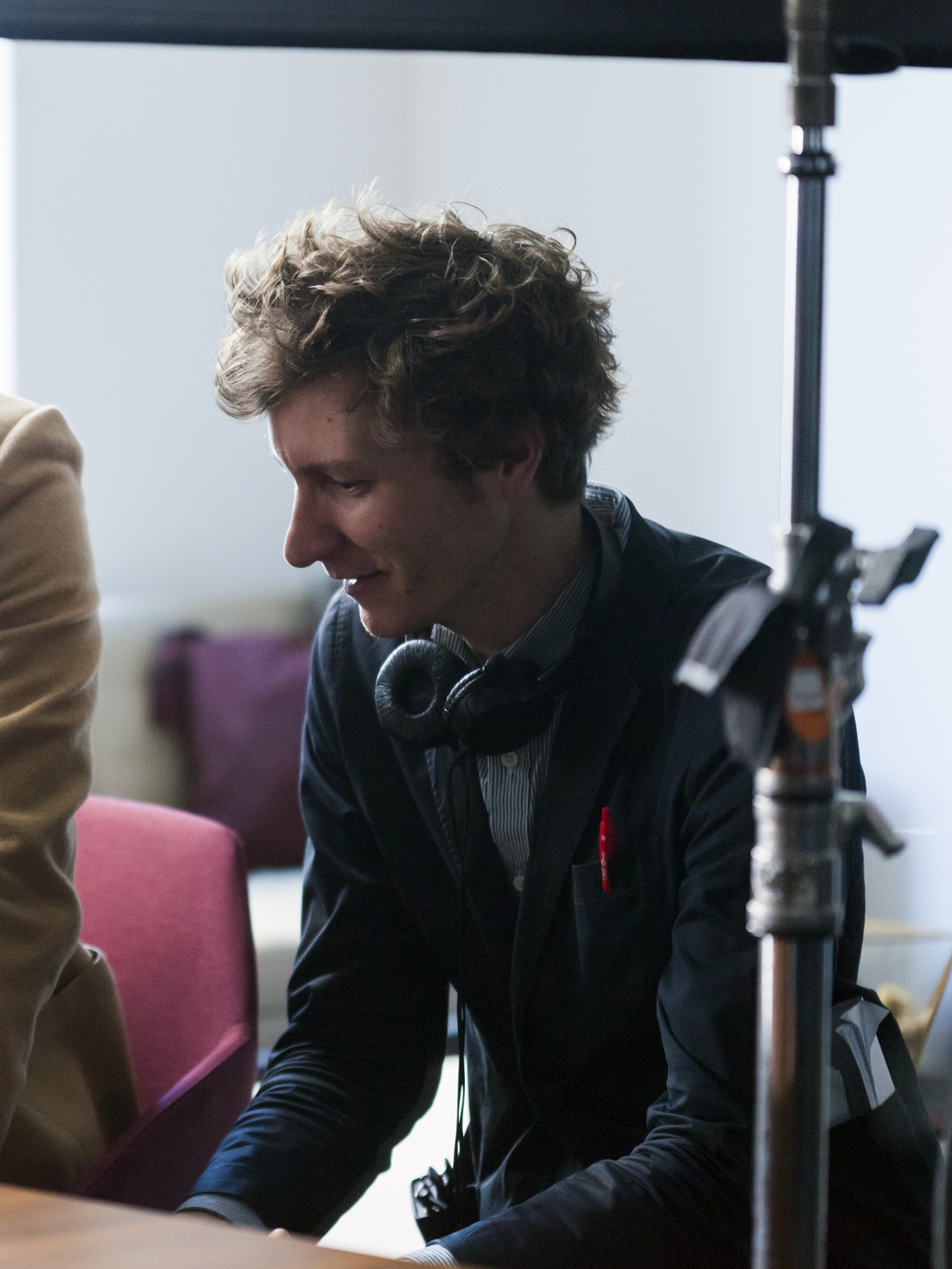
- Michael Tyburski on the set of The Sound of Silence
- Born: August 8, 1984 (age 42)
- Occupations: Screenwriter, film director
- Years active: 2011–present

Michael Tyburski (born August 8, 1984) is an American film director and screenwriter, best known for directing The Sound of Silence, which premiered at the Sundance Film Festival.

== Early life ==
Tyburski was born and raised in Vermont's rural Northeast Kingdom. While at North Country Union High School, he produced and hosted two seasons of a cable-access show, broadcast from his parents' basement. At age 15, he attended the Fledgling Films Summer Institute, founded by Vermont filmmaker, Jay Craven, where he first learned the craft of filmmaking. In college, Tyburski majored in Moving Image Arts at the College of Santa Fe in New Mexico. After graduating, he served as a production assistant and performed various other roles on There Will Be Blood.

== Career ==
Early in his career, Tyburski came up directing commercials and branded content for major companies such as Google, Verizon, GE, Target, and L’Oreal. He also served as the director of photography on the SXSW Grand Jury Prize winning documentary, William and the Windmill.

In 2013, Tyburski's short film, "Palimpsest," premiered at Sundance, where it won a Special Jury Award. That same year, Tyburski was named amongst the "25 New Faces of Independent Film" by Filmmaker Magazine.

In 2014, his short documentary, “Brooklyn Farmer,” premiered at the San Sebastián International Film Festival, in the Culinary Zinema section. In 2015, his short, "Actor Seeks Role," premiered at IFFBoston, where it won the Grand Jury Prize for Narrative Short Film, and was also featured on The New Yorkers Screening Room series.

Tyburski's debut feature film, The Sound of Silence, starring Peter Sarsgaard and Rashida Jones, premiered at the 2019 Sundance Film Festival in U.S. Dramatic Competition. The film was acquired for international distribution by Sony Pictures Worldwide and by IFC Films in the United States.

The Sound of Silence received the SFFILM Dolby Fellowship, which allowed the film to be finished in the high-dynamic-range format of Dolby Vision, and the immersive sound of Dolby Atmos. It was the first time the Dolby Institute Fellowship was given to a film at the script stage, before filming commenced. While making the film, Tyburski was also named a Feature Film Fellow by the Sundance Institute, after attending the Film Music and Sound Design Lab at Skywalker Sound. In development, the project was selected for the Independent Filmmaker Project's Emerging Storyteller's Program, and the Screenwriting Lab at the Hampton's International Film Festival, where it received support from the Alfred P. Sloan Foundation. The script was also the recipient of the "High Scribe Award" at the Sun Valley Film Festival Screenwriters Lab, hosted by Mark Duplass.

Tyburski's second feature, Turn Me On, a dystopian romance starring Bel Powley and Nick Robinson, premiered at the 72nd San Sebastián International Film Festival in the New Directors section. The film is being distributed in North America by Vertical Entertainment.

== Filmography ==
=== Feature films ===
- The Sound of Silence (2019)
- Turn Me On (2024)

=== Short films ===
- "Angelfish" (2011)
- "Palimpsest" (2013)
- "Brooklyn Farmer" (2013)
- "Actor Seeks Role" (2015)
