= Like Water for Chocolate =

Like Water for Chocolate may refer to:

- Like Water for Chocolate (novel), by Laura Esquivel
  - Like Water for Chocolate (film), a 1992 film based on the novel
  - Like Water for Chocolate (ballet), a three-act ballet by Christopher Wheeldon based on the novel
- Like Water for Chocolate (album), by Common

== See also ==
- Water for Chocolate, a 2006 album by Deni Hines
