= Audie Award for Spanish Language Title =

The Audie Award for Spanish Language Title is one of the Audie Awards presented annually by the Audio Publishers Association (APA). It awards excellence in narration, production, and content for a Spanish-language audiobook released in a given year. The award was discontinued in 2011, having been presented since 2007, but it has been restored since the 26th Audie Awards in 2021.

== Winners and finalists ==
=== 2007-2010 ===
Year	Audiobook	Author	Narrator	Publisher	Result	Ref.
2007 12th	Ángeles y demonios (2000)	Dan Brown	Raul Amundaray	FonoLibro	Winner	
2007 12th	Caballo de Troya 7: Nahum (2005)	J. J. Benítez	Full cast	FonoLibro	Finalist	
2007 12th	El rey de los pleitos (2003)	John Grisham	Karl Hoffman	FonoLibro	Finalist	
2007 12th	La cena secreta (2004)	Javier Sierra	Francisco Rivela	Recorded Books	Finalist	
2007 12th	Las cinco personas que encontraras en el cielo (2003)	Mitch Albom	Francisco Rivela	Hyperion Audio	Finalist	
2008 13th	Malinche (2006)	Laura Esquivel	Lucía Mendez	FonoLibro	Winner	
2008 13th	20 mil leguas de viaje submarino (1870)	Jules Verne	Full cast	FonoLibro	Finalist	
2008 13th	El Zahir (2005)	Paulo Coelho	Full cast	FonoLibro	Finalist	
2008 13th	Inés del alma mía (2006)	Isabel Allende	Isabel Varas	FonoLibro	Finalist	
2008 13th	La isla del tesoro (1883)	Robert Louis Stevenson	Full cast	FonoLibro	Finalist	
2009 14th	Por un día más (2006)	Mitch Albom	José Manuel Vieira	FonoLibro	Winner	
2009 14th	América (1995)	T. C. Boyle	Gutiérrez Sergio	Blackstone Audio	Finalist	
2009 14th	De cómo las muchachas García perdieron el acento (1991)	Julia Álvarez	Adriana Sananes, Rossmery Almonte, Silvia Sierra, Laura Gómez, and Rosie Berrido	Recorded Books	Finalist	
2009 14th	El vecindario de Quinito (2005)	Ina Cumpiano	Jonathan Davis	Audible	Finalist	
2009 14th	La bruja de Portobello (2006)	Paulo Coelho	Full cast	FonoLibro	Finalist	
2010 15th	La travesía de Enrique (2006)	Sonia Nazario	Adriana Sananes	Recorded Books	Winner	
2010 15th	El juego del ángel (2008)	Carlos Ruiz Zafón	Francisco Rivela	Recorded Books	Finalist	
2010 15th	La audacia de la esperanza (2006)	Barack Obama	Erwin Dorado	FonoLibro	Finalist	
2010 15th	¿Por qué ese idiota es rico y yo no? (2008)	Robert Shemin	Francisco Rivela	Recorded Books	Finalist	
2010 15th	Una nueva tierra (2005)	Eckhart Tolle	José Manuel Vieira	FonoLibro	Finalist	

=== 2020s ===
Year of Release	Audiobook	Author(s)	Narrator	Audiobook Publisher	Result	Ref.
2021 26th	El laberinto del fauno (2019)	Guillermo del Toro and Cornelia Funke	Kerygma Flores and Luis Ávila	Penguin Random House Grupo Editorial México	Winner	
2021 26th	Evelyn Del Rey se muda (2020)	Meg Medina	Jane Santos	Dreamscape	Finalist	
2021 26th	La hermandad del Triskelión (2016)	Germán Rodríguez Citraro	Juan Guzmán	FonoLibro	Finalist	
2021 26th	Mi sombría Vanessa (2020)	Kate Elizabeth Russell	Ximena Restrepo	HarperAudio	Finalist	
2021 26th	Sí, si es contigo (2019)	Daniela Calle Soto and María José "Poché" Garzón Guzmán	Daniela Calle Soto and María José "Poché" Garzón Guzmán	Penguin Random House Grupo Editorial Colombia	Finalist	
2022 27th	La Casa de Bernada Alba	Federico García Lorca	Gloria Muñoz, Elena González, Rebeca Hernando, Carmen Mayordomo, Marta Poveda, Sol de la Barreda, Beatriz Melgares, Cristina Arias, and Antonio Martínez Asensio	Penguin Random House Grupo Editorial	Winner	
2022 27th	25 cuentos populares de Perú para crecer juntos	José Morán Orti (editor)	Nuria Mediavilla, Nerea Alfonso, Marcel Navarro, and Xavi Fernández	VOCA Editorial	Finalist	
2022 27th	Desierto Sonoro	Valeria Luiselli	Marina de Tavira	Penguin Random House Audio	Finalist	
2022 27th	Gabo y Mercedes: una despedida	Rodrigo García	Rodrigo García	Penguin Random House Grupo Editorial	Finalist	
2022 27th	Valentine: Amor y furia	Elizabeth Wetmore	Gabriela Guraieb and Patricia Loranca Ochoa	HarperAudio	Finalist	
2023 28th	¡Primera Caída! El Enmascarado de Terciopelo	Diego Mejía Eguiluz	Noé Velázquez	Penguin Random House Grupo Editorial México	Winner	
2023 28th	CAKE: Una historia de amor	J. Bengtsson	Bella M. and Sebastian Leon	Sirena Audiobooks Production	Finalist	
2023 28th	Gastrosofía	Cristina Macía and Eduardo Infante	Ana María Muñoz	BookaVivo	Finalist	
2023 28th	Velorio	Xavier Navarro Aquino	Diana Pou, Vico Ortiz, María Victoria Martínez, Gil René Rodríguez, Jesús E. Martínez, Gabriel S. Rivera Vázquez, and Yetta Gottesman	HarperAudio	Finalist	
2023 28th	Yo te salvaré	Matt de la Peña	Alberto Santillán	Penguin Random House Audio	Finalist	
2024 29th	El Ingenioso Hidalgo Don Quijote de la Mancha (c. 1605)	Miguel de Cervantes	Israel Elejalde, Pedro Casablanc, and full cast	Penguin Random House Grupo Editorial S.A.U.	Winner	
2024 29th	Con Luz Propia	Michelle Obama, translated by Gabriel Dols Gallardo, Efrén Del Valle Peñamil, Raúl Sastre Letona, and Carlos Abreu Fetter	Jane Santos	Penguin Random House Audio	Finalist	
2024 29th	Vincent, Girasoles Contra el Mundo	Mario Iván Martínez	Mario Iván Martínez, Diego Jáuregui, and full cast	Penguin Random House Grupo Editorial México	Finalist	
2024 29th	La Guardiana de Recuerdos de Kyiv	Erin Litteken	Eva Coll and Marta Moreno	BookaVivo	Finalist	
2024 29th	Verte Regresar: los 43+	Luis Alberto Gónzalez Arenas	Luis Alberto Gónzalez Arenas and Clivia Torres	Audible Originals	Finalist	
2025 30th	Medea Me Cantó un Corrido	Dahlia de la Cerda	Irene Azuela, Maya Zapata, and a full cast	Editorial Audiolibre	Winner	
2025 30th	La canción de Aquiles	Madeline Miller	Pedro M. Sánchez	BookaVivo	Finalist	
2025 30th	Hija legítima	Aida Rodriguez	Kianny Antigua	HarperAudio	Finalist	
2025 30th	La isla oculta	Abraham Jiménez Enoa, prologue by Jon Lee Anderson	Ernesto Rumbaut and Javier Lacroix	Penguin Random House Audio	Finalist	
2025 30th	A veces despierto temblando	Ximena Santaolalla	Jaime Collepardo, Dan Osorio, and a full cast	Penguin Random House Grupo Editorial México	Finalist	
2026 31st	Apocalipsis Z - El principio del fin	Manel Loureiro	Javier Rey, Maggie Civantos, José María de Tavira, Manuel Chacón, Oleg Kricunova, Marta Barriuso, Peter Nikolas, Rosalía Castro, Mercedes Castro, Manuel de Andrés, David García Palencia, Oscar Goikoetxea, Sabela Mascuñana, and Daniel Méndez	Audible Originals	Winner	
2026 31st	(Cómo ser una) Gorda Libre	Miriam Lara-Mejia and Adonde Media	Miriam Lara-Mejia	Audible Originals	Finalist	
2026 31st	El hombre	Guillermo Arriaga	Javier Poza, Noé Velázquez, Dan Osorio, Chava Reyes, Pilar Escandón, and Ariel Sainz	Penguin Random House Grupo Editorial México	Finalist	
2026 31st	Esperanza - La Autobiografía	Pope Francis	Gerardo Prat	Penguin Random House Grupo Editorial S.A.U.	Finalist	
2026 31st	La Celestina (1499)	Fernando de Rojas	Israel Elejalde, Natalia Huarte, María Pujalte, Pedro Casablanc, Francesco Carril, Marta Larralde, Eugenio Gómez, Juan Paños, Rebeca Hernando, Charo Soria, Paula Iwasaki, Arturo Querejeta, Jaime Soler Huete, Raúl García Arrondo, Pablo Ibáñez Durán, and Daniel Ortiz	Penguin Random House Grupo Editorial S.A.U.	Finalist	
