= LWFC =

LWFC may refer to:

- Lake Wendouree Football Club
- Like Water for Chocolate (novel), a novel by Laura Esquivel
  - Like Water for Chocolate (film), a film based on the book
- Like Water for Chocolate (album), an album by Common
- Lochore Welfare F.C., a Scottish football club
- London Welsh F.C., an English non-league football club
