= Swift as Desire =

2001 novel by Laura Esquivel

- Author: Laura Esquivel
- Language: Spanish
- Genre: Magical realism
- Published: 2001 (Random House)
- Publication place: Mexico
- ISBN: 978-1-74051-082-0

Swift as Desire (in Spanish Tan veloz como el deseo) is a 2001 novel by the Mexican novelist Laura Esquivel.

== Plot synopsis ==
Don Júbilo, born with a smile on his face, was blessed at birth with almost supernatural hearing and an instinctive understanding of all kinds of communication, from an insect's faint rustle to the sweet sighs of a woman in love. He used his gift to become the peacemaker in his family, slyly mistranslating between his Spanish-speaking grandmother doña Jesusa, and his Mayan-speaking grandmother doña Itzel, who argue incessantly because the grandmother is angry her son married a non-Mayan, and doña Itzel is determined that Júbilo grow up connected to his heritage. Though the two women may say cruel things to each other, Júbilo gives each woman what she needs to hear, a skill he hones as a little boy that serves him well when he becomes a telegraph operator in adulthood.

At age fifteen Júbilo meets thirteen-year-old Lucha from a well-to-do family. Engaging in a slow, chaste relationship for seven years, the couple decide to get married. Passionate sexual creatures, Júbilo and Lucha communicate their love physically and frequently. Esquivel uses magical realism to tune Júbilo into frequencies that help him communicate verbally and with his body when he’s with his wife. Abandoning his dream to become a singer, Júbilo becomes a telegraph operator to support his young family. In the era before telephone services, interpreting Morse code messages for villagers and rich landowners alike puts Júbilo at the center of many lives as his own slowly falls apart. Lucha, the daughter of a wealthy family, is distressed by their relative poverty and her inability to conceive again after their first child, Raul, is born. Júbilo does the best he can, but his weakness for alcohol gets the better of him.

Lucha tries to adapt to Júbilo’s mentality that things can possess you and only love matters, an attitude that echoes the Mayan grandmother, who abhors technology because “The danger she saw was that technological advances served no purpose if they were not accompanied by an equivalent spiritual development.” Júbilo’s efforts to use Morse code at the telegraph office to deliver what the messenger should send is evidence that he takes her concerns to heart. However, she is unable to forgive him for the death of their second son, Ramiro

The narrative exists in two main timelines: First, the late 1930s and early 1940s when Júbilo was newly married, and the mid-1990s, when he is an old man on his death bed. Lucha has not spoken to him in decades, but the reason is not articulated. The later timeline is narrated by their daughter, Lluvia, and the rest by an omniscient narrator. As the story of the deeply-in-love couple slowly unfolds, the reader approaches the critical point that causes them to stop speaking. From a starting point of a truly magical ability in the area of communication, the culmination of the tale is a sort of mirror image, in which Júbilo as an old man is dying of Parkinson's, and cannot communicate at all.

== Reception ==
Reviews were mixed, leaning towards the positive.

Kirkus Reviews calls the novel an imaginative, lyrical fictional memoir, which is both "tender and thoughtful, if at times rather stilted". Similarly, Publishers Weekly also lauds Esquivel's style, calling Swift as Desire a "quirky and sensual story with a moralistic twist, its cute-as-can-be characters arguing and loving with equal passion." However, this review also acknowledges that the book "lacks that certain something that enthralled readers of Like Water for Chocolate." The review concludes on a positive note, however, assuring readers that "chuckles and sighs" are to be had, and that "if a reader craves more of the sweet wackiness that made the author's first book so appealing, Swift As Desire certainly delivers." It declaims that "Esquivel's storytelling abilities are in top form here, and, despite its unoriginality, the novel succeeds in conveying a touching message of the power of familial and romantic love."

Booklist's Kathleen Hughes assures "fans of Esquivel, and there are many, will definitely enjoy this beautifully written story done in her trademark magical and bittersweet style." Library Journal's Mary Margaret Benson writes, "Once again, Mexican novelist Esquivel mixes together an unexpected blend of ingredients, in this case Mayan and Aztec numerology, communication technologies (from telegraphs to computers), and human passions..... full of passion, fascinating cultural history, and endearing characters and will be enjoyed by her many fans."

The Yale Review of Books panned the novel, estimating that the prose "ranges from the melodramatic ... to the mind-numbingly dull." Kelly Koepke's BookPage review, however, was enthusiastic, calling Swift as Desire "an enchanting, bittersweet story that demonstrates in convincing fashion how keeping secrets leads to unhappiness, while true communication can lead to love." Koepke concludes that "Esquivel's illumination of the motives that drive us as humans, even when we do not understand them, sets her novels apart. That ability, coupled with her dramatic use of the lush, tropical settings of her native Mexico, creates another work of fiction that acknowledges the alchemy of connection and the despair that results from severing those ties."
