= La Malinche =

Nahua aide to Hernán Cortés

Marina
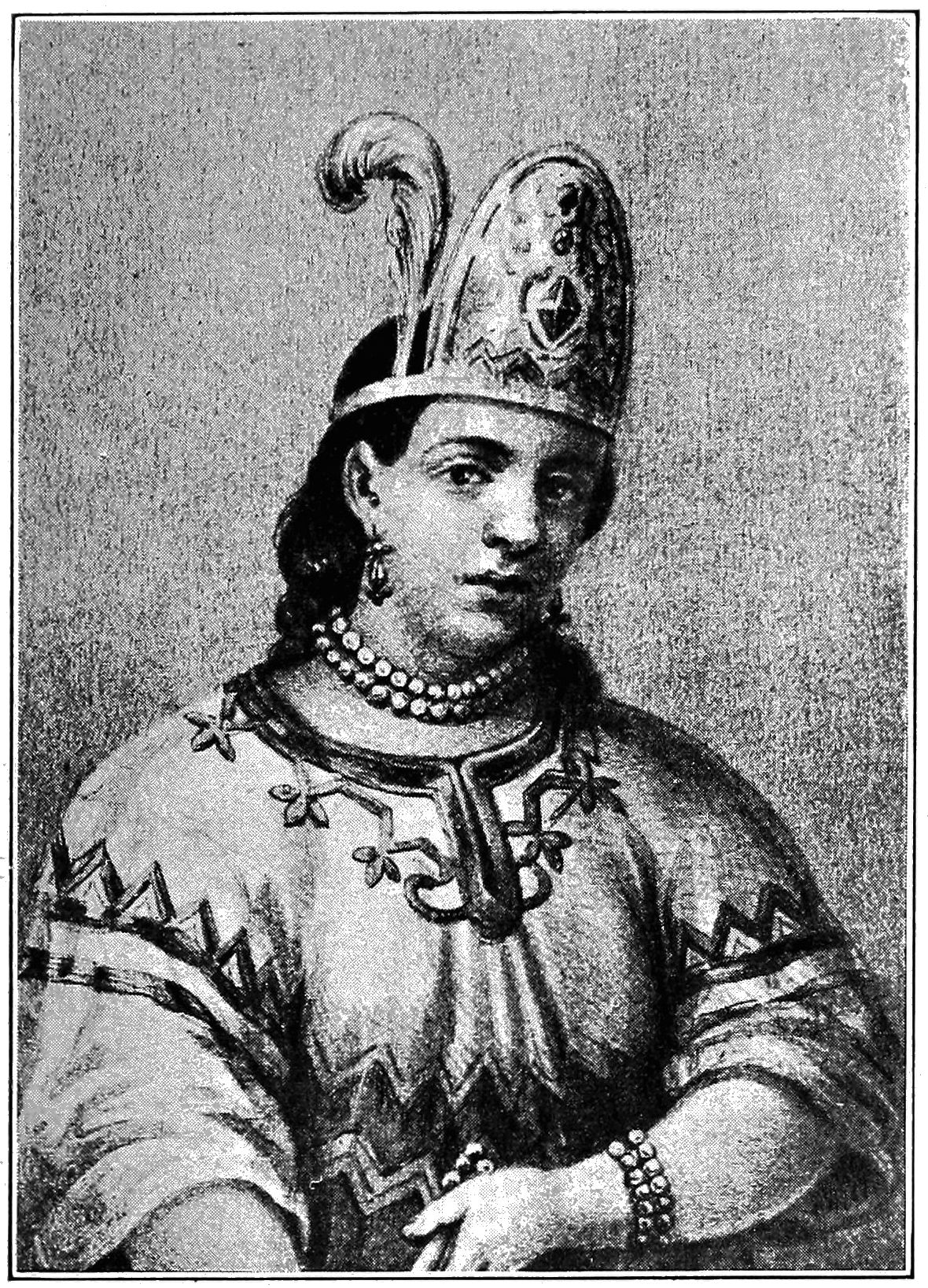
- Malintzin, in an engraving dated 1886.
- Born: c. 1500; The Gulf of Mexico Coastline
- Died: Before February 1529 (aged 28–29)
- Other names: Malintzin, La Malinche
- Occupations: Interpreter, advisor, intermediary
- Known for: Role in the Spanish conquest of the Aztec Empire
- Spouse: Juan Jaramillo
- Partner: Hernán Cortés
- Children: Martín Cortés; María

Marina ([maˈɾina]) or Malintzin ([maˈlintsin]; c. 1500 – c. 1529), more popularly known as La Malinche ([la maˈlintʃe]), was a Nahua American Indian woman, who became known for contributing to the Spanish invasion of the Aztec Empire (1519–1521), by acting as an interpreter, advisor, and intermediary for the Spanish conquistador Hernán Cortés. She was one of 20 enslaved women given to the Spaniards in 1519 by the Amerindians of Tabasco, Mexico. Cortés chose her as a consort, and she later gave birth to their first son, Martín – one of the first Mestizos (people of mixed European and American Indian ancestry) in New Spain.

La Malinche's reputation has shifted over the centuries, as various peoples evaluate her role against their own societies' changing social and political perspectives. While most historians emphasize her importance to the conquest of the Aztec Empire, recognizing her multilingual abilities (she spoke both Nahuatl and Maya), they disagree on the reasons why La Malinche assisted the Spanish colonists. After the Mexican War of Independence, which led to Mexico's independence from Spain in 1821, dramas, novels, and paintings portrayed her as an evil or scheming temptress. In Mexico today, La Malinche remains a powerful icon – understood in various and often conflicting aspects as the embodiment of treachery, the quintessential victim, or as the symbolic mother of the Mexican people. The term malinchista refers to a disloyal compatriot, especially in Mexico.

== Name ==
Malinche is known by many names, though her birth name is unknown. Malinche was baptized in the Roman Catholic Church and given the Christian name "Marina", often preceded by the honorific doña. The Nahua called her Malintzin, derived from Malina, a Nahuatl rendering of her Spanish name, and the honorific suffix -tzin. According to historian Camilla Townsend, the vocative suffix -e is sometimes added at the end of the name, giving the form Malintzine, which would be shortened to Malintze, and heard by the Spaniards as Malinche. (Note: The vocative form is used when addressing someone, so "Malintzine" and "Malintze" are more or less equivalent to "O Marina". Although the shortened form “Malintze” is unusual, it appears repeatedly in the Anales de Tlatelolco, alongside “Malintzine”) Another possibility is that the Spaniards simply did not hear the “whispered” -n of the name Malintzin.

The title Tenepal was often assumed to be part of her name. In the annotation made by Nahua historian Chimalpahin on his copy of Gómara's biography of Cortés, Malintzin Tenepal is used repeatedly about Malinche. According to linguist and historian Frances Karttunen, Tenepal is probably derived from the Nahuatl root tene, which means "lip-possessor, one who speaks vigorously", or "one who has a facility with words", and postposition -pal, which means "through". Historian James Lockhart, however, suggests that Tenepal might be derived from tenenepil, "somebody’s tongue". In any case, Malintzin Tenepal appears to have been a literal translation of Spanish doña Marina la lengua, with la lengua, "the interpreter", literally meaning "the tongue", being her Spanish sobriquet.

Since at least the 19th century, she was believed to have originally been named Malinalli, (Note: Also Malinal, Ce-Malinalli, and so forth.) (Nahuatl for "grass"), after the day sign on which she was supposedly born. If so, Marina would have been chosen as her baptismal name because of its phonetic similarity. Modern historians have rejected such mythic suggestions, noting that the Nahua associate the day sign Malinalli with bad or "evil" connotations, and they are known to avoid using such day signs as personal names. Moreover, there would be little reason for the Spaniards to ask the Amerindians what their names were before they were Christianized with new names after Catholic saints.

== Life ==
=== Background ===
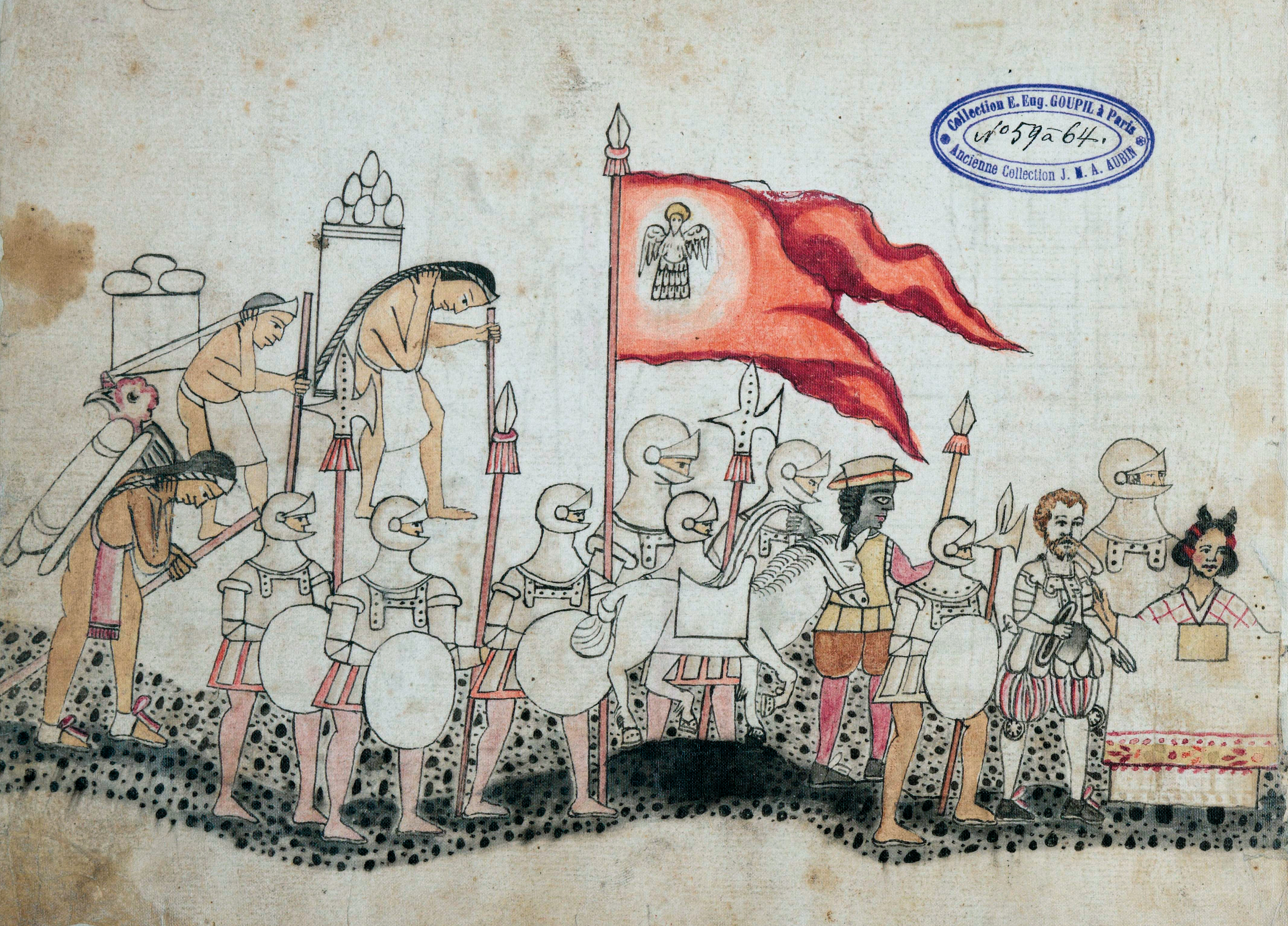
Codex Azcatitlan, Hernán Cortés and Malinche (far right), early 16th-century Amerindian pictorial manuscript of the conquest of Mexico

Malinche's birthdate is unknown, but it is estimated to be around 1500, and likely no later than 1505. (Note: Karttunen (1994) gives "ca. 1500" for her birth year, while Townsend (2006) writes that she was born before Charles V (who was born in February 1500) turned five.) She was born in an altepetl that was either a part of or a tributary of a Mesoamerican state, whose centre was located on the bank of the Coatzacoalcos River to the east of the Aztec Empire. (Note: Malinche's homeland never became part of the Aztec Empire. Around the time of the conquest, the region probably consisted of "small, loosely allied city-states" with some degree of influences from the Aztec and various Maya states, but most are relatively autonomous and paid tribute to no one.) Records disagree about the exact name of the altepetl where she was born. In three unrelated legal proceedings that occurred not long after her death, various witnesses who claimed to have known her personally, including her daughter, said that she was born in Olutla. The probanza of her grandson also mentioned Olutla as her birthplace. Her daughter added that the altepetl of Olutla was related to Tetiquipaque, although the nature of this relationship is unclear. In the Florentine Codex, Malinche's homeland is mentioned as "Teticpac", which is most likely the singular form of Tetiquipaque. Gómara writes that she came from "Uiluta" (presumably a variant of Olutla). He erroneously believed that it was in the region of Jalisco (which was territory of the Purépecha Empire by then, thus making his assumptions highly unlikely). Díaz, on the other hand, gives "Painalla" as her birthplace.

Her family is reported to have been that of a noble background; Gómara writes that her father was related to a local ruler, while Díaz recounts that her parents were rulers. Townsend notes that while Olutla at the time probably had a Popoluca-speaking majority, the ruling elite, which Malinche supposedly belonged to, would have been Nahuatl-speaking. Another hint that supports her noble origin is her apparent ability to understand the courtly language of tecpillahtolli ("lordly speech"), a Nahuatl register that is significantly different from the commoner's speech and has to be learned. Diaz and other contemporaries refer to her, and other women of noble births, with the honorific doña. This may have been in recognition of her important role in the conquest.

Malinche was probably between the ages of 8 and 12 when she was either sold or kidnapped into slavery. Díaz wrote that after her father's death, she was given away to merchants by her mother and stepfather so that their son (Malinche's half-brother) would have the rights of an heir. Scholars, historians, and literary critics alike have cast doubt upon Díaz's account of her origin, in large part due to his strong emphasis on Catholicism throughout his narration of the events.

In particular, historian Sonia Rose de Fuggle analyses Díaz's over-reliance on polysyndeton (which mimics the sentence structure of many Biblical stories) as well as his overarching portrayal of Malinche as an ideal Christian woman. But Townsend believes that it was likely that some of her people were complicit in trafficking her, regardless of the reason. Malinche was taken to Xicalango, a major port city in the region. She was later purchased by a group of Chontal Maya, who brought her to the town of Potonchán. It was here that Malinche started to learn the Chontal Maya language, and perhaps also Yucatec Maya. (Note: Chontal is closely related to Yucatecan, but they are sufficiently distinct to hamper intelligibility. Around this time, traders from the Yucatán Peninsula (who spoke Yucatecan) often were active in this region, and Malinche may have learned the language from them. Alternatively, she may have done some adjustment to be able to converse with speakers of other Maya varieties. (This would have been unusual.)) Her acquisition of the language later enabled her to communicate with Gerónimo de Aguilar, another interpreter for Cortés, who also spoke Yucatec Maya, as well as his native Spanish.

=== The conquest of Mexico ===
Motecuçoma was told how the Spaniards were bringing along with them a Mexica [Nahuatl-speaking] Indian woman called Marina, a citizen of the settlement of Teticpac, on the shore of the North Sea [Caribbean], who served as interpreter and said in the Mexican language everything that Captain don Hernando Cortés told her to.

— Report from the emissaries to Moctezuma. Florentine Codex, Book XII, Chapter IX

Early in his expedition to Mexico, Cortés was confronted by the Maya at Potonchán. In the ensuing battle, the Mayas suffered significant loss of lives and asked for peace. In the following days, they presented the Spaniards with gifts of food and gold, as well as twenty enslaved women, including Malinche. The women were baptised and distributed among Cortés's men, who expected to use them as servants and sexual objects. Malinche was given to Alonso Hernández Puertocarrero, one of Cortés' captains. He was a first cousin to the count of Cortés's hometown, Medellín.

Malinche's language skills were discovered when the Spaniards encountered the Nahuatl-speaking people at San Juan de Ulúa. Moctezuma's emissaries had come to inspect the peoples, but Aguilar could not understand them. Historian Gómara wrote that, when Cortés realised that Malinche could talk with the emissaries, he promised her "more than liberty" if she would help him find and communicate with Moctezuma. Cortés took Malinche from Puertocarrero.

Aided by Aguilar and Malinche, Cortés talked with Moctezuma's emissaries. The emissaries also brought artists to make paintings of Malinche, Cortés, and the rest of the group, as well as their ships and weapons, to be sent as records for Moctezuma. Díaz later said that the Nahua addressed Cortés as "Malinche"; they took her as a point of reference for the group. (Note: Díaz explained this phenomenon by positing that "Malinche" in reference to Cortés was a shorthand for "Marina's Captain", because she was always in his company. But Townsend said that possessive construction in Nahuatl cannot be shortened that way. Moreover, Díaz's theory does not explain the fact that "Malinche" was also applied to Juan Perez de Arteaga, another Spaniard learning Nahuatl from her.)

From then on, Malinche worked with Aguilar to bridge communication between the Spaniards and the Nahua; Cortés would speak Spanish with Aguilar, who translated into Yucatec Maya for Malinche, who in turn translated into Nahuatl, before reversing the process. The translation chain grew even longer when, after the emissaries left, the Spaniards met the Totonac, whose language was not understood by either Malinche or Aguilar. There, Malinche asked for Nahuatl interpreters. Karttunen remarks that "it is a wonder any communication was accomplished at all", for Cortés' Spanish words had to be translated into Maya, Nahuatl, and Totonac before reaching the locals, whose answers went back through the same chain. Meeting with the Totonac was how the Spaniards first learned of opponents to Moctezuma.

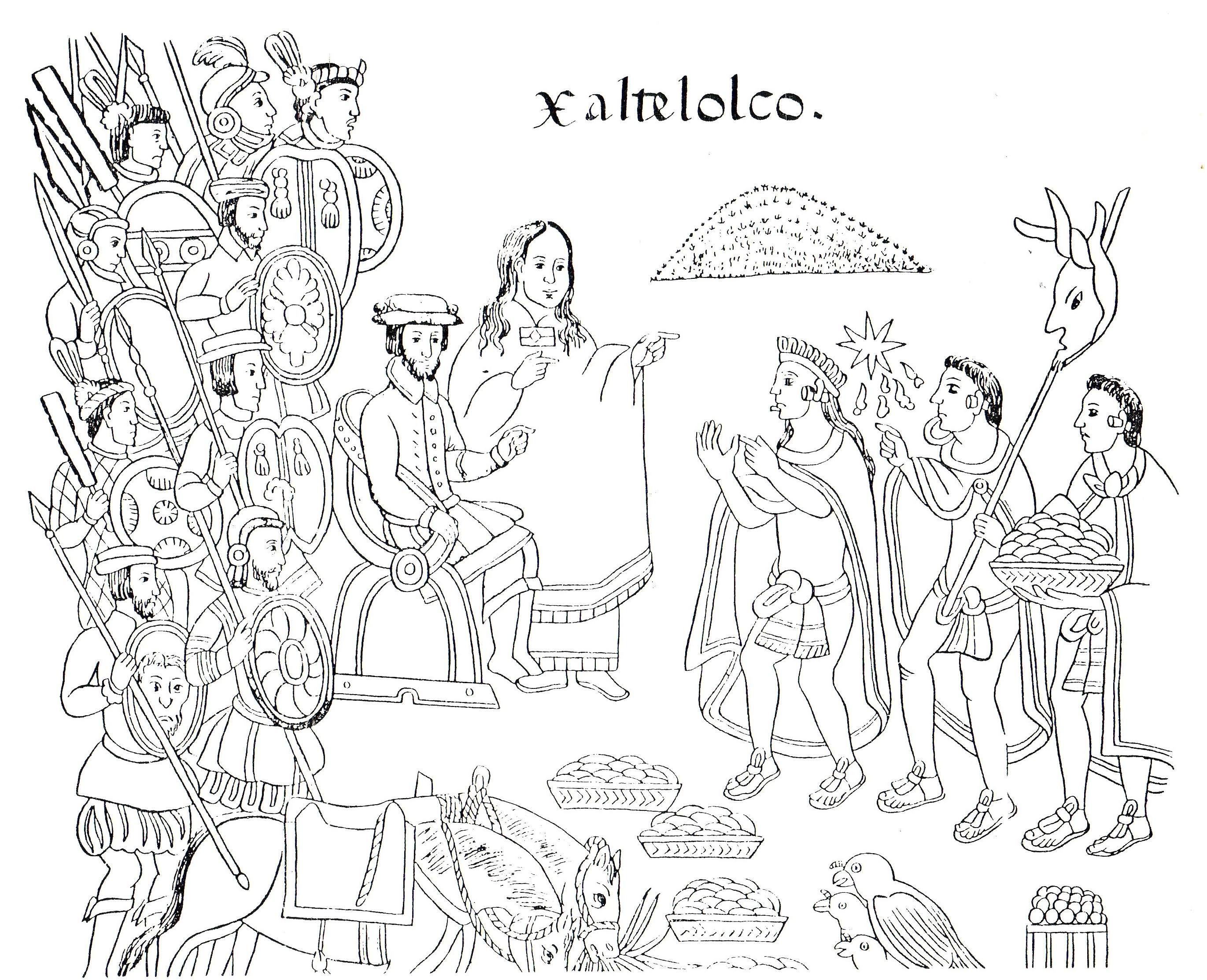
La Malinche and Hernán Cortés in the city of Xaltelolco, in a drawing from the late 16th-century codex History of Tlaxcala

After founding the town of Villa Rica de la Vera Cruz to be freed from the legal restriction of what was supposed to be an exploratory mission, the Spaniards stayed for two months in a nearby Totonac settlement. They secured a formal alliance with the Totonac and prepared for a march toward Tenochtitlan.

The first major polity that they encountered on the way to Tenochtitlan was Tlaxcala. Although the Tlaxcaltec were initially hostile to the Spaniards and their allies, they later permitted the Spaniards to enter the city. The Tlaxcalans negotiated an alliance with the Spaniards through Malinche and Aguilar. Later Tlaxcalan visual records of this meeting feature Malinche as a prominent figure. She appears to bridge communication between the two sides, as the Tlaxcalan presented the Spaniards with gifts of food and noblewomen to cement the alliance. After several days in Tlaxcala, Cortés continued the journey to Tenochtitlan by the way of Cholula. By then he was accompanied by a large number of Tlaxcalan soldiers.

The Spaniards were received at Cholula and housed for several days. The explorers claimed that the Cholulans stopped giving them food, dug secret pits, built a barricade around the city, and hid a large Aztec army in the outskirts to prepare for an attack against the Spaniards. Somehow, the Europeans learned of this and, in a preemptive strike, assembled and slaughtered the Cholulans. Later accounts claimed that Malinche had uncovered the plot. According to Díaz, she was approached by a Cholulan noblewoman who promised her a marriage to the woman's son if she were to switch sides. Pretending to go along with the suggestion, Malinche was told about the plot and later reported all the details to Cortés.

In later centuries, this story has often been cited as an example of Malinche's "betrayal" of her people. But modern historians such as Hassig and Townsend have suggested that Malinche's "heroic" discovery of the purported plot was likely already a fabricated story intended to provide Cortés with political justification for his actions, to distant Spanish authorities. In particular, Hassig suggests that Cortés, seeking stronger native alliances leading to the invasion of Tenochtitlan, worked with the Tlaxcalans to coordinate the massacre. Cholula had supported Tlaxcala before joining the Aztec Empire one or two years prior, and losing them as an ally had been a severe blow to the Tlaxcalans. Their state was now completely encircled by the Aztecs. Hassig and other historians assert that Tlaxcalans considered the attack on the Cholulans as a "litmus test" of the Spanish commitment to them.

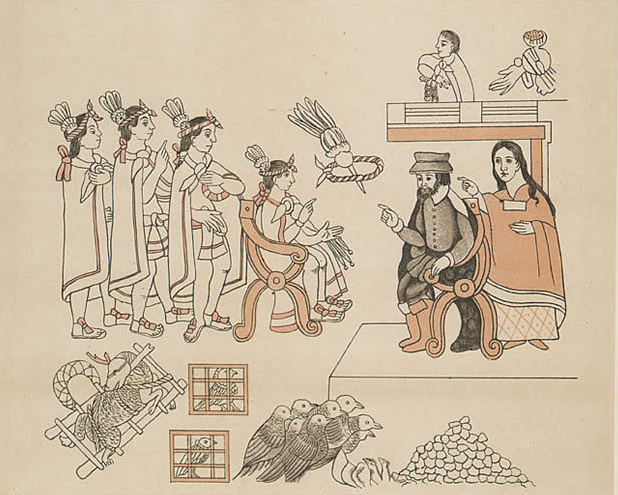
The meeting of Cortés and Moctezuma II, with Malinche acting as interpreter.

The combined forces reached Tenochtitlan in early November 1519, where they were met by Moctezuma on a causeway leading to the city. Malinche was in the middle of this event, translating the conversation between Cortés and Moctezuma. Gomara writes that Moctezuma was "speaking through Malinche and Aguilar", although other records indicate that Malinche was already translating directly, as she had quickly learned some Spanish herself. Moctezuma's flowery speech, delivered through Malinche at the meeting, has been claimed by the Spaniards to represent a submission, but this interpretation is not followed by modern historians. The deferential nature of the speech can be explained by Moctezuma's usage of tecpillahtolli, a Nahuatl register known for its indirection and complex set of reverential affixes. Despite Malinche's apparent ability to understand tecpillahtolli, it is possible that some nuances were lost in translation. The Spaniards, deliberately or not, may have misinterpreted Moctezuma's words.

Tenochtitlán fell in late 1521 and Malinche's son by Cortes, Martín Cortés was born in 1522. During this time Malinche stayed in a house Cortés built for her in the town of Coyoacán, 13 km (8 mi) south of Tenochtitlán. The Aztec capital city was being redeveloped to serve as Spanish-controlled Mexico City. Cortés took Malinche to help quell a rebellion in Honduras in 1524–1526 when she again served as interpreter (she may have known Mayan languages beyond Chontal and Yucatec). While in the mountain town of Orizaba in central Mexico, she married Juan Jaramillo, a Spanish hidalgo. Some contemporary scholars have estimated that she died less than a decade after the conquest of Mexico-Tenochtitlan, at some point before February 1529. She was survived by her son Don Martín, who would be raised primarily by his father's family, and a daughter Doña María, who would be raised by Jaramillo and his second wife Doña Beatriz de Andrada.

Although Martín was Cortés's first-born son and eventual heir, his relation to Malinche was poorly documented by prominent Spanish historians such as Francisco López de Gómara. He never referred to Malinche by name, even in her work as Cortés's translator. Even during Malinche's lifetime, she spent little time with Martín. But many scholars and historians have marked her multiracial child with Cortés as the symbolic beginning of the large mestizo population that developed in Mesoamerica.

== Debates about Malinche's role and influence in the Spanish Conquest ==
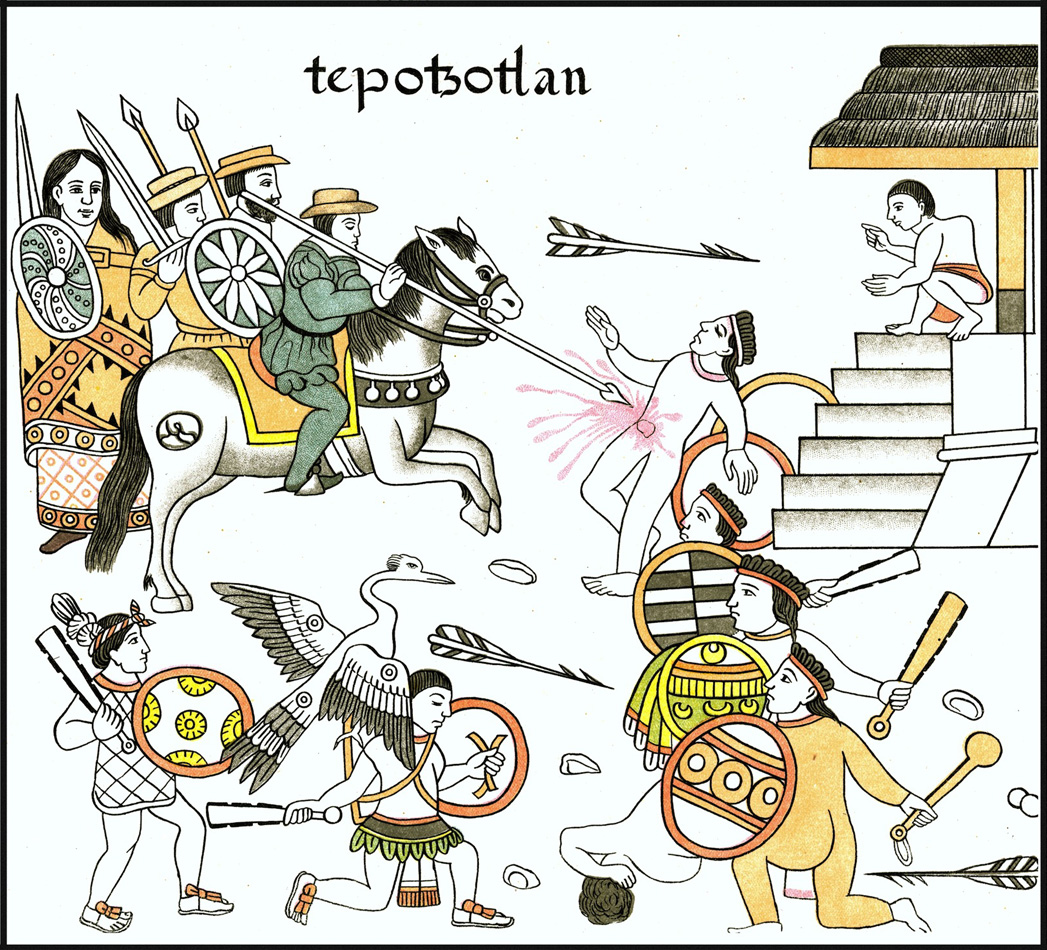
Malinche (left) depicted with sword and shield during the Battle of Tepotzotlán.

Conquistadores in their writings emphasize the importance of a reliable interpreter like Malinche and suggest that Malinche's role and influence were larger still. Bernal Díaz del Castillo, a soldier who wrote as an old man, speaks repeatedly and reverentially of her importance. "Without the help of Doña Marina," he writes, "we would not have understood the language of New Spain and Mexico." Rodríguez de Ocaña, another conquistador, relates Cortés' assertion that after God, Malinche was the main reason for his success. The Conquistadors on various occasions recalled that one of Malinche's greatest skills had been her ability to convince other Amerindians of what she could perceive: that it was useless in the long run to stand against Spanish metal (arms) and Spanish ships. Despite this, after Malinche began assisting Cortés, the Spanish were forced into combat on multiple occasions.

Primary evidence from American Indian sources is even more indicative, both in the commentaries about Malinche's role and in her prominence in the codex drawings made of conquest events. Although some portray Malinche as a traitor, she was not viewed as such by all the Tlaxcalans. Some depict her as "larger than life," sometimes larger than Cortés, in rich clothing, and an alliance is shown between her and the Tlaxcalan instead of them and the Spaniards. In the Lienzo de Tlaxcala (History of Tlaxcala), for example, not only is Cortés rarely portrayed without Malinche poised by his side, but she is shown at times on her own, seemingly directing events as an independent authority, and even carrying weapons herself. A picture has two couples of Spanish captains and Amerindian women leading action, being probably Cortés with Malinche and Pedro de Alvarado with his Tlaxcalan consort Tecuelhuetzin.

Historians have debated Malinche's role and autonomy within the conquest. Some historians give great credit to Malinche's diplomatic skills, with some "almost tempted to think of her as the real conqueror of Mexico." Historians like Karttunen point out that Malinche's diplomacy may have been neither intentional nor desired; her choices to interpret and mediate were made in the context of survival. Townsend adds that Malinche's diplomatic skills enabled her survival, noting Malinche's ability to command the respect of both Spaniards and Nahuas. According to Townsend, Malinche knew how to speak in different registers and tones among certain American Indian tribes and classes of people. For the Nahua audiences, she spoke rhetorically, formally, and high-handedly, giving the impression that she was a noblewoman who knew what she was talking about. Other historians, however, have questioned Malinche's role. Clendinnen argues that the most important communications between Cortés and Moctezuma II occurred nonverbally, through gifts and gestures, and that Malinche, an enslaved woman, was unlikely to have fully comprehended these exchanges.

== Image in contemporary Mexico ==
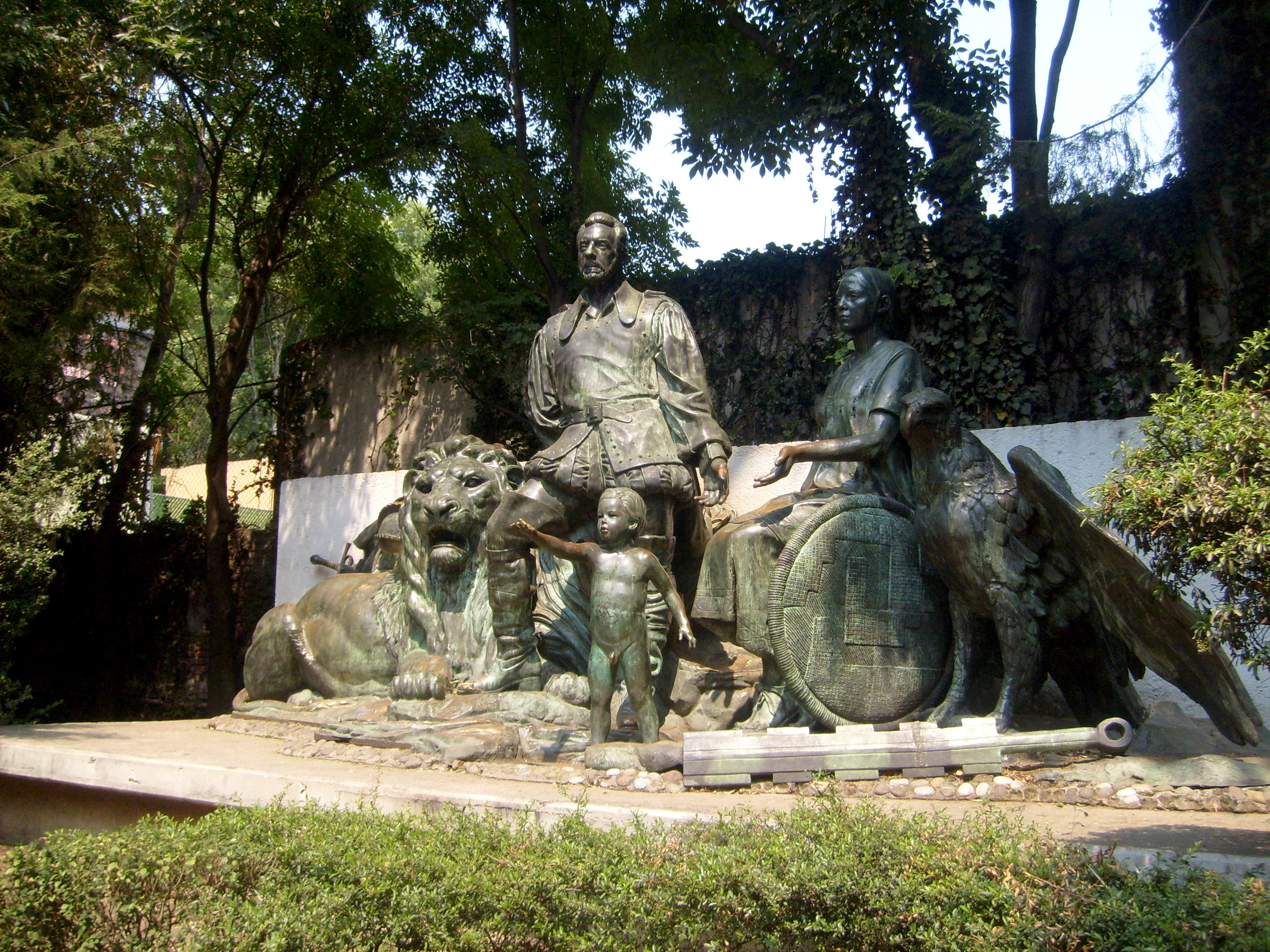
Modern statue of Cortés, Malinche, and their son Martín, which was moved from a prominent place of display to an obscure one, in Mexico City, Mexico, due to protests

Malinche's image has become a mythical archetype that artists have represented in various forms of art. Her figure permeates historical, cultural, and social dimensions of Mexican cultures. In modern times and several genres, she is compared with La Llorona (folklore story of the woman weeping for lost children), and the Mexican soldaderas (women who fought beside men during the Mexican Revolution) for their brave actions.

La Malinche's legacy is one of myth mixed with legend and the opposing opinions of the Mexican people about the legendary woman. Some see her as a founding figure of the Mexican nation, while others continue to see her as a traitor—as may be assumed from a legend that she had a twin sister who went North, and from the pejorative nickname La Chingada associated with her twin.

Feminist interventions into the figure of Malinche began in the 1960s. The work of Rosario Castellanos was particularly significant; Chicanas began to refer to her as a "mother" as they adopted her as symbolism for duality and complex identity. Castellanos's subsequent poem "La Mallinche" recast her not as a traitor but as a victim. Mexican feminists defended Malinche as a woman caught between cultures, forced to make complex decisions, who ultimately served as a mother of a new race.

Today in Mexican Spanish, the term malinchismo and its adjetive malinchista are used to denounce Mexicans who are perceived as those of denying their cultural heritage by preferring foreign cultural expressions.

Some historians believe that La Malinche saved her people from the Aztecs, who held a hegemony throughout the territory and demanded tribute from its inhabitants. Some Mexicans also credit her with having brought Christianity to the New World from Europe, and for having influenced Cortés to be more humane than he would otherwise have been. It is argued, however, that without her help, Cortés would not have been successful in conquering the Aztecs as quickly, giving the Aztec people enough time to adapt to new technology and methods of warfare. From that viewpoint, she is seen as one who betrayed the American Indians by siding with the Spaniards. Recently, several feminists have decried such categorization as scapegoating.

President José López Portillo commissioned a sculpture of Cortés, Doña Marina, and their son Martín, which was placed in front of Cortés' house in the Coyoacán section of Mexico City. Once López Portillo left office, the sculpture was removed to an obscure park in the Mexican capital.

== In popular culture ==
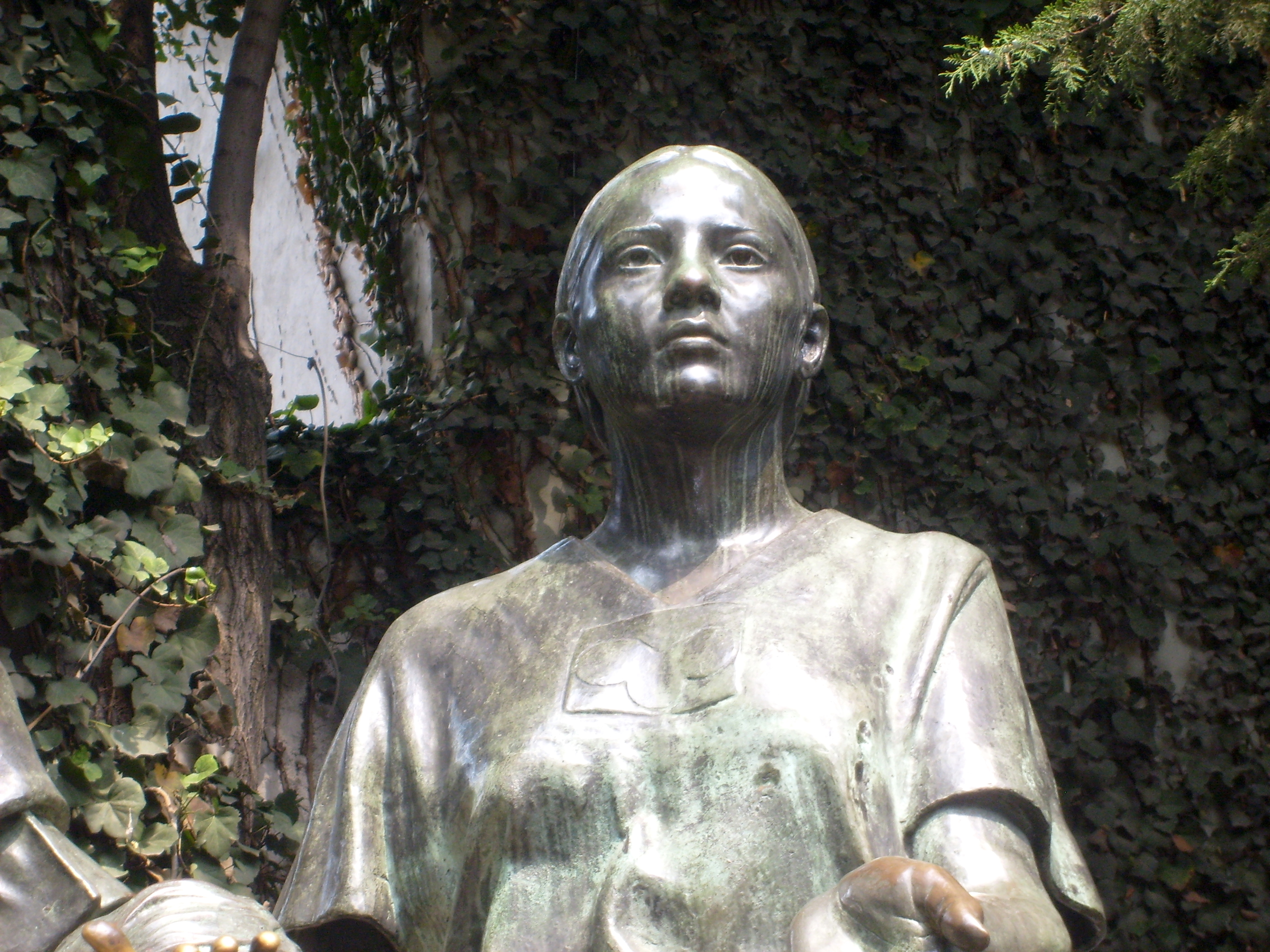
La Malinche, as part of the Monumento al Mestizaje in Mexico City, Mexico

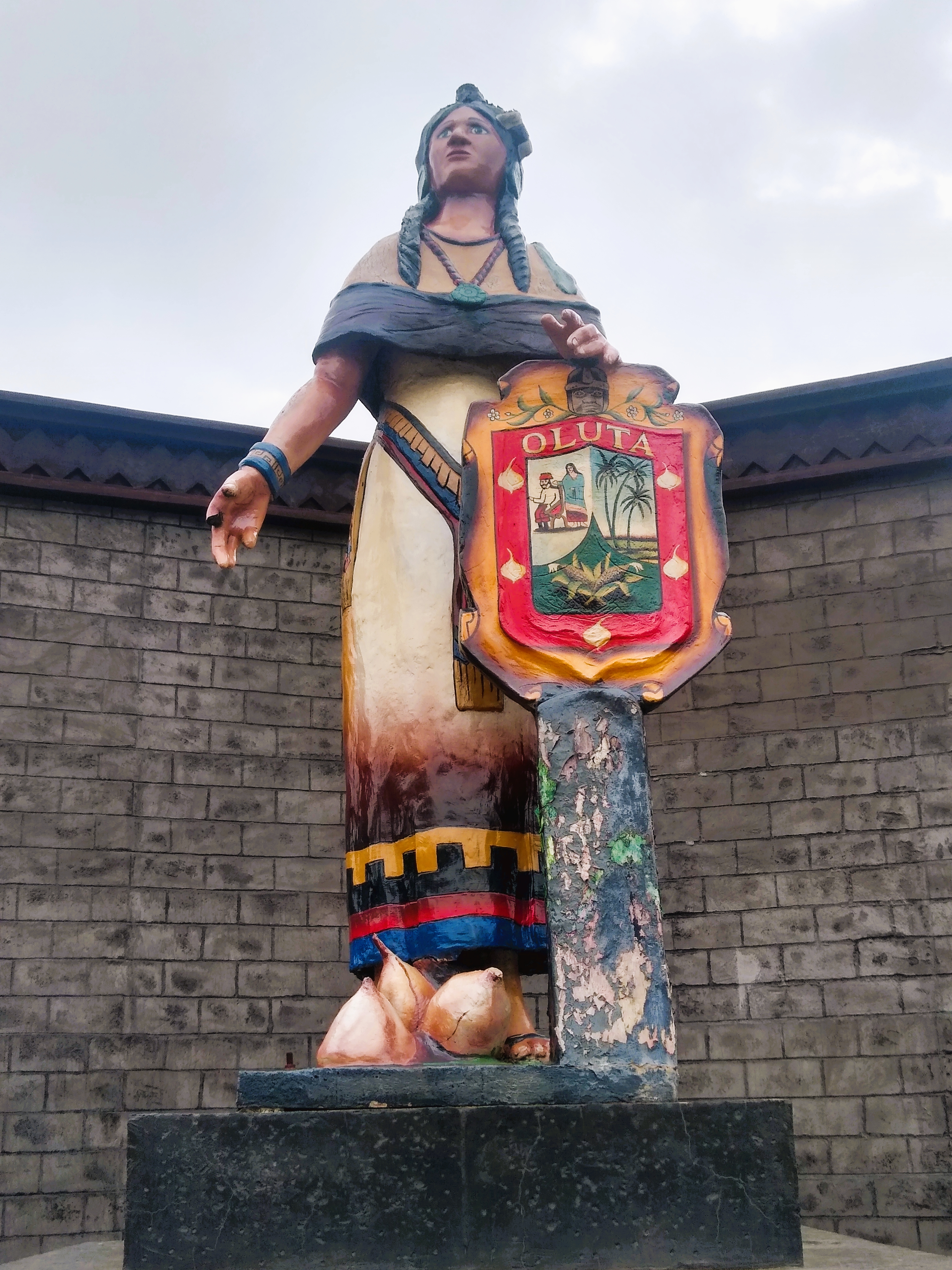
La Malinche, in Villa Oluta, Veracruz, Mexico

- A reference to La Malinche as Marina is made in the novel The Manuscript Found in Saragossa by the Polish author Jan Potocki, in which she is cursed for yielding her "heart and her country to the hateful Cortez, chief of the sea-brigands."
- La Malinche appears in the adventure novel Montezuma's Daughter (1893) by H. Rider Haggard.
- Doña Marina appears in the Henry King film Captain from Castile (1947) played Estela Inda.
- La Malinche is portrayed as a Christian and protector of her fellow native Mexicans in the novel Tlaloc Weeps for Mexico (1939) by László Passuth, and is the main protagonist in such works as the novels The Golden Princess (1954) by Alexander Baron and Feathered Serpent: A Novel of the Mexican Conquest (2002) by Colin Falconer. In contrast, she is portrayed as a duplicitous traitor in Gary Jennings' novel Aztec (1980). A novel published in 2006 by Laura Esquivel portrays the main character as a pawn of history who becomes Malinche.
- In 1949, choreographer José Limón premiered the dance trio "La Milanche" to music by Norman Lloyd. It was the first work created by Limón for his company and was based on his memories as a child of Mexican fiestas.
- The story of La Malinche is told in Cortez and Marina (1963) by Edison Marshall.
- In the 1973 Mexican film Leyendas macabras de la colonia, La Malinche's mummy is in the possession of Luisa, her daughter by Hernán Cortés, while her spirit inhabits a cursed painting.
- La Malinche is referred to in the songs "Cortez the Killer" from the 1975 album Zuma by Neil Young, and "La Malinche" by the French band Feu! Chatterton from their 2015 album Ici le jour (a tout enseveli)
- In the animated television series The Mysterious Cities of Gold (1982), which chronicles the adventures of a Spanish boy and his companions traveling throughout South America in 1532 to seek the lost city of El Dorado, a woman called Marinche becomes a dangerous adversary. The series was originally produced in Japan and then translated into English.
- In the fictional Star Trek universe, a starship, the USS Malinche, was named for La Malinche and appeared in the 1997 "For the Uniform" episode of Star Trek: Deep Space Nine. This was done by Hans Beimler, a native of Mexico City, who together with friend Robert Hewitt Wolfe later wrote a screenplay based on La Malinche called The Serpent and the Eagle.
- La Malinche is the main character in the 2002 French novel L'Indienne de Cortés (English: Cortés' Indian Woman) by Carole Achache.
- La Malinche is a key character in the opera La Conquista (2005) by Italian composer Lorenzo Ferrero.
- Malinalli is the main character in a 2011 historical novel by Helen Heightsman Gordon, Malinalli of the Fifth Sun: The Slave Girl Who Changed the Fate of Mexico and Spain.
- Author Octavio Paz traces the root of mestizo and Mexican culture to La Malinche's child with Cortés in The Labyrinth of Solitude (1950). He uses her relation to Cortés symbolically to represent Mexican culture as originating from rape and violation, but also holds Malinche accountable for her "betrayal" of the indigenous population, which Paz claims "the Mexican people have not forgiven."
- The novel Night of Sorrows by Frances Sherwood is an account of the life of La Malinche (called Malitzín within the novel).
- Malinal is a character in Graham Hancock's series of novels War God: Nights of the Witch (2013) and War God: Return of the Plumed Serpent (2014), which is a fictional story describing the events related to the Hernan Cortés' expedition to Mexico and the Spanish conquest of the Aztec empire.
- Malinche is a character in Edward Rickford's The Serpent and the Eagle, referred to variously as Dona Marina and Malintze. The depiction of her character was praised by historical novelists and bloggers.
- La Malinche appears in the biographical Mexican series Malinche in 2018, where she is portrayed by María Mercedes Coroy.
- La Malinche appears in the Amazon Prime series Hernán. She is portrayed by Ishbel Bautista.
- Malintzin: The Story of an Enigma. Documentary of 2019 based on the life of La Malinche.
- Malintzin is a character in Álvaro Enrigue's novel You dreamed of Empires (2022), a fictional re-imagining of the first few days of the encounter between Hernán Cortes and Moctezuma.
- La Malinche is referenced in the Disney+ series National Treasure: Edge of History. In the series, she is portrayed as a double agent working to protect Aztec treasures from Cortés.
- In 2022, Spanish musician Nacho Cano produced Malinche, a stage musical in Madrid. The show will be produced in Mexico with a Mexican cast.
- Malinche, by Haniel Long was published in 1938

== See also ==
- Felipillo
- History of Mexico
- Hernán Cortés – a Spanish conquistador, to whom La Malinche served as a personal interpreter and bore their Mestizo first child, Martín Cortés.
- Pocahontas – a Powhatan American Indian woman notable for her role as an interpreter for the English colonists of Jamestown, Virginia.
- Spanish conquest of the Aztec Empire
- Women in Mexico
- American Indian women in the conquest of Paraguay
