= Like Water for Chocolate (ballet) =

2022 ballet by Christopher Wheeldon

Like Water for Chocolate is a 2022 narrative ballet in three acts with a scenario by Christopher Wheeldon and Joby Talbot, based on a 1989 novel by Mexican novelist Laura Esquivel and its 1992 film adaptation, both with the same title. The ballet was choreographed by Wheeldon to music by Talbot with orchestrations by Ben Foskett.

It was premiered on June 2, 2022, by The Royal Ballet in London with Francesca Hayward as Tita and Marcelino Sambé as Pedro. It was given its United States premiere on March 28, 2023, by American Ballet Theatre at the Segerstrom Center for the Arts in Costa Mesa, California, with Cassandra Trenary as Tita and Herman Cornejo as Pedro. The latter company took it to New York's Metropolitan Opera House, beginning on June 22. A shared production of The Royal Ballet and American Ballet Theatre, both runs were conducted by Alondra de la Parra, who was also credited as Music Consultant.

== Critical reception ==
Critical reception for the ballet was mixed, with some critics praising the production and dancing but others writing the ballet was plot-heavy, often limiting the choreography, was laden with Hollywood-style music, and like many Broadway shows, had too much elaborate staging and costuming.

== Synopsis ==
Like Water for Chocolate follows the life of Tita De La Garza, a woman living during the Mexican Revolution, as she yearns for her one true love, Pedro Muzquiz. The ballet spans the length of 20 years, as Tita, Pedro, and the other members of the De La Garza Ranch are caught between tradition, the cycles of generations, war, and romance.

=== Act 1 ===
==== Scene 1: The De la Garza Ranch ====
The ballet opens inside the De la Garza Ranch kitchen, as a young Tita cooks with the family cook, Nacha. Nacha and Tita express their affection for each other while cooking, and Tita as well expresses her love and affection for her neighbor, Pedro. Tita and Pedro long for each other and Pedro proposes marriage to Tita. However, according to family tradition, the youngest daughter cannot marry in order to care for her mother as she ages. When Pedro and his father approach Tita's mother, Elena De la Garza, to ask for Tita's hand in marriage, Elena refuses, and redirects Pedro's proposal to Tita's older sister, Rosaura. Tita is devastated by this, and weeps into the batter she prepares to celebrate Pedro and Rosaura's wedding. Nacha tastes the cake that was baked with Tita's tears and is filled with grief over her lost love, and dies.

==== Scene 2: Rosaura and Pedro's Wedding ====
The guests arrive to celebrate Rosaura and Pedro's wedding. Tita, still consumed with sadness over the marriage is reassured by Pedro that they will still be able to be together, as Pedro gives Tita a rose as a symbol of their love. The guests consume the cake filled with Tita's tears, and become violently ill. Nacha is also revealed to have passed.

==== Scene 3: Baby Roberto ====
One year later, Rosaura and Pedro have had a baby boy, Roberto. However, Rosaura is struggling to feed him, and Doctor John Brown is called in as assistance. As the baby cries, Tita is left alone for a moment with the baby and Pedro, as they are both filled with love for each other. Mama Elena walks in on the two, interrupting the moment, and Mama Elena grows suspicious of both of them.

==== Scene 4: Quail in Rose Petal Sauce ====
Tita prepares a meal for the family using the rose that Pedro gave her at the wedding. After eating the meal, Gertrudis, Tita's sister, is filled with sensuality and romance, and tears off her clothes in an act of lust. She is spotted by a revolutionary soldier, who picks up Gertrudis as the two are wrapped up in sexual desire, and carries Gertrudis away.

==== Scene 5: A Hot, Sleepless Night ====
In the middle of the night, Tita and Pedro meet each other amidst the hanging sheets of laundry. As Tita and Pedro become swept up in each other, Mama Elena and Rosaura each prowl the home, suspicious of the two. As Tita and Pedro kiss, they are interrupted by a furious Mama Elena, who orders Pedro and Rosaura to leave the ranch.

==== Scene 6: Tita's Breakdown ====
Tita is devastated that Pedro and Roberto are now gone. When Chencha brings news that Roberto has died, Tita and Mama Elena blame each other for the death of the baby. During the fight, Mama Elena beats Tita, causing Tita to have a breakdown. Dr. John Brown is brought in to care for Tita.

=== Act II ===
==== Scene 1: Dr. John's House ====
Tita's health is improved by living with Dr. John and his son from his first wife. Dr. John proposes marriage to Tita. Tita and Dr. John are informed that Mama Elena has died.

==== Scene 2: Mama Elena's Wake ====
Tita, Dr. John, Pedro, Rosaura, and their young daughter, Esperanza, arrive at the ranch to mourn Mama Elena. The group gather around the table that Mama Elena's body was placed on, as Tita discovers through a diary left in a box by Mama Elena, that Mama Elena too once has a forbidden love. A young Mama Elena rises to reenact her love to José, a man who she loved dearly but was forbidden from marrying by her parents. Young Mama Elena was forced instead to marry another man, and in spite her efforts to escape before her marriage with José.

==== Scene 3: The Engagement Dinner ====
Dr. John announces his engagement to Tita, as Pedro continues to declare his love to Tita when they are alone together. When Tita and Pedro once again become swept up in their love for each other, a ghost of Mama Elena appears, haunting their love. Suddenly, Gertrudis and soldiers from the revolutionary army arrive, along with the commander that Gertrudis has married, bringing a joyous surprise and celebration to the sisters.

==== Scene 4: Campfires ====
Celebrating the return of Gertrudis, a party is thrown outside, littered with bright campfires. Tita returns her engagement ring to Dr. John, wishing to be with Pedro, her true love. As Tita and Pedro join the group of happy dancers, they continue to be haunted by the ghost of Mama Elena, who follows and confronts them as they dance. Mama Elena's ghost reveals herself to Pedro, causing him to have a heart attack.

=== Act III ===
==== Scene 1: Three Rooms ====
As Pedro, being treated by Dr. John, improves, Rosaura's health fails. Dr. John and Tita work to care for both Pedro and Rosaura as John's son dances with Esperanza, raising Rosaura's jealousy and possessiveness over her daughter. Holding Esperanza back in the same way that Mama Elena held back Tita, Rosaura, grips her daughter until Rosaura suddenly dies.

==== Scene 2: The Ranch ====
20 years later, Tita, Pedro, and Dr. John return to celebrate the marriage of Dr. John's son to Esperanza, all celebrating that the oppressive tradition has been broken. After the wedding, Tita and Pedro are left alone, where they can finally consummate their love together. As they have sex, the house bursts into flames, fueled by the passion Tita and Pedro have for each other.

== Video ==
- 2022: Francesca Hayward as Tita, Marcelino Sambé as Pedro. Orchestra of the Royal Opera House, conducted by Alondra de la Parra. Recorded June 9, 2022.
