= Shemin =

Shemin is a Jewish surname. Notable people with the surname include:

- Robert Shemin, American real estate investor and author
- William Shemin, sergeant in the U.S. Army during World War I awarded the Medal of Honor
