= Malinche (novel) =

Mexican novel

Malinche is a 2006 Mexican historical novel by Laura Esquivel.

Set in the Spanish conquest of the Aztec Empire, it portrays the relationship of Hernán Cortés and La Malinche, dealing with the reinterpretation of her historical accusation for treachery.

The audiobook of this novel (in the voice of Lucía Méndez) was awarded The Audies 2008 award, granted by APA.
