= The Law of Love =

1996 novel by Laura Esquivel

- Author: Laura Esquivel
- Translator: Laura Esquivel
- Illustrator: Miguelanxo Prado
- Language: Spanish and English
- Genre: Novel
- Publisher: Three Rivers Press
- Publication date: 1996
- Publication place: Mexico and United States
- Media type: Print
- Pages: 288 pp
- ISBN: 0609801279

The Law of Love (Spanish: La ley del amor) is the second novel by the Mexican novelist Laura Esquivel., published in 1996 (originally published in Spanish in 1995). The Law of Love is a multi-genre and multi-media publication which includes elements of history, mythology, magical realism, science fiction, and features graphic novel sections that are intended to be accompanied by music from an included CD.
