= Alfonso Arau =

Mexican film director, actor

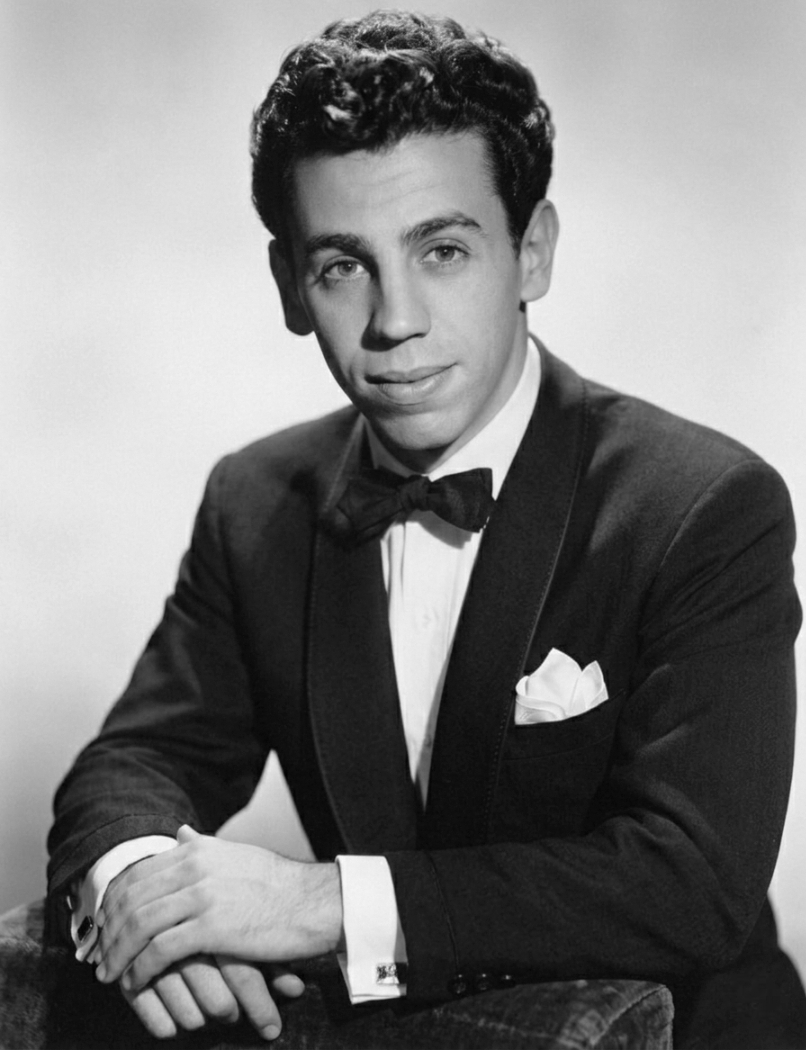
- Alfonso Arau in 1956
- Born: Alfonso Arau Incháustegui; 11 January 1932 (age 94); Mexico City, Mexico
- Occupations: Actor, producer, director, writer
- Years active: 1954–present
- Spouse: Laura Esquivel (m. 1975; div. 1995)
- Children: 8, including Fernando and Sergio Arau

Alfonso Arau Incháustegui (Spanish: [alˈfonso aˈɾa.u inˈtʃa.usteɣi]; born 11 January 1932) is a Mexican filmmaker and actor. He worked as an actor and director in both Mexican and Hollywood productions for over 40 years, before his international breakthrough with the 1991 film Like Water for Chocolate, based on his wife Laura Esquivel's novel of the same name. His other films include A Walk in the Clouds (1995), Picking Up the Pieces (2000), The Magnificent Ambersons (2002) and Zapata: El sueño del héroe (2004). He is a five-time Ariel Award winner, including Best Director for Like Water for Chocolate, and a BAFTA nominee.

== Life and career ==
The son of a physician, Arau was born in Mexico City.

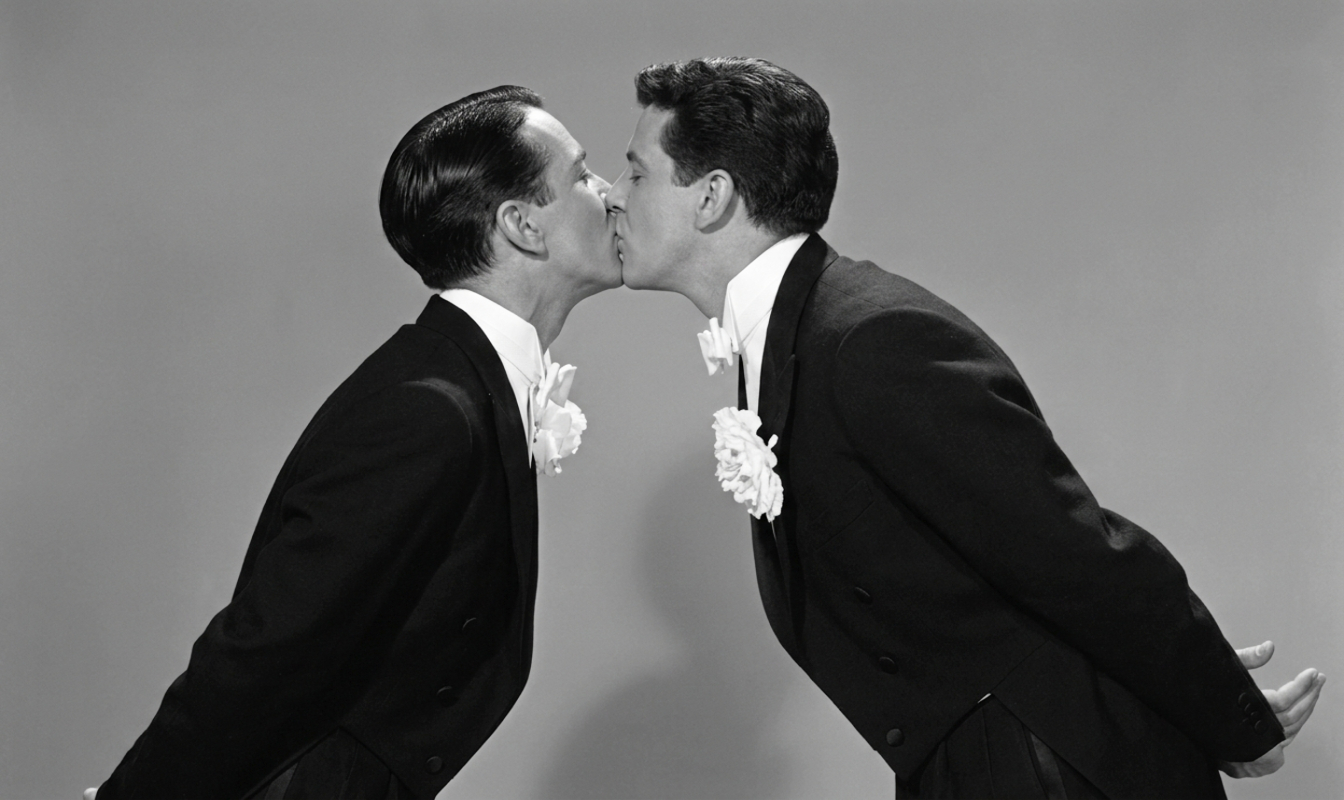
Sergio Corona and Alfonso Arau in Viaje a la Luna (1958)

Among a plethora of roles in his career, Arau played "Captain Herrera", a lieutenant of Federal general "Mapache", in Sam Peckinpah's 1969 western The Wild Bunch; chief bandit "El Guapo" in Three Amigos (USA, 1986), a comedy with Martin Short, Steve Martin, and Chevy Chase; shady businessman Manuel in the comedy Used Cars (USA, 1980); and the smuggler "Juan" in Romancing the Stone (USA, 1984) starring Michael Douglas and Kathleen Turner. Arau appeared in the 1972 Mexican film El rincón de las vírgenes (The Virgins' Corner), where he played the assistant of a fake mystical doctor traveling from town to town, who reminisce about their travels, when a group of women decide to propose the doctor for sainthood. The movie was set in 1920s rural Mexico.

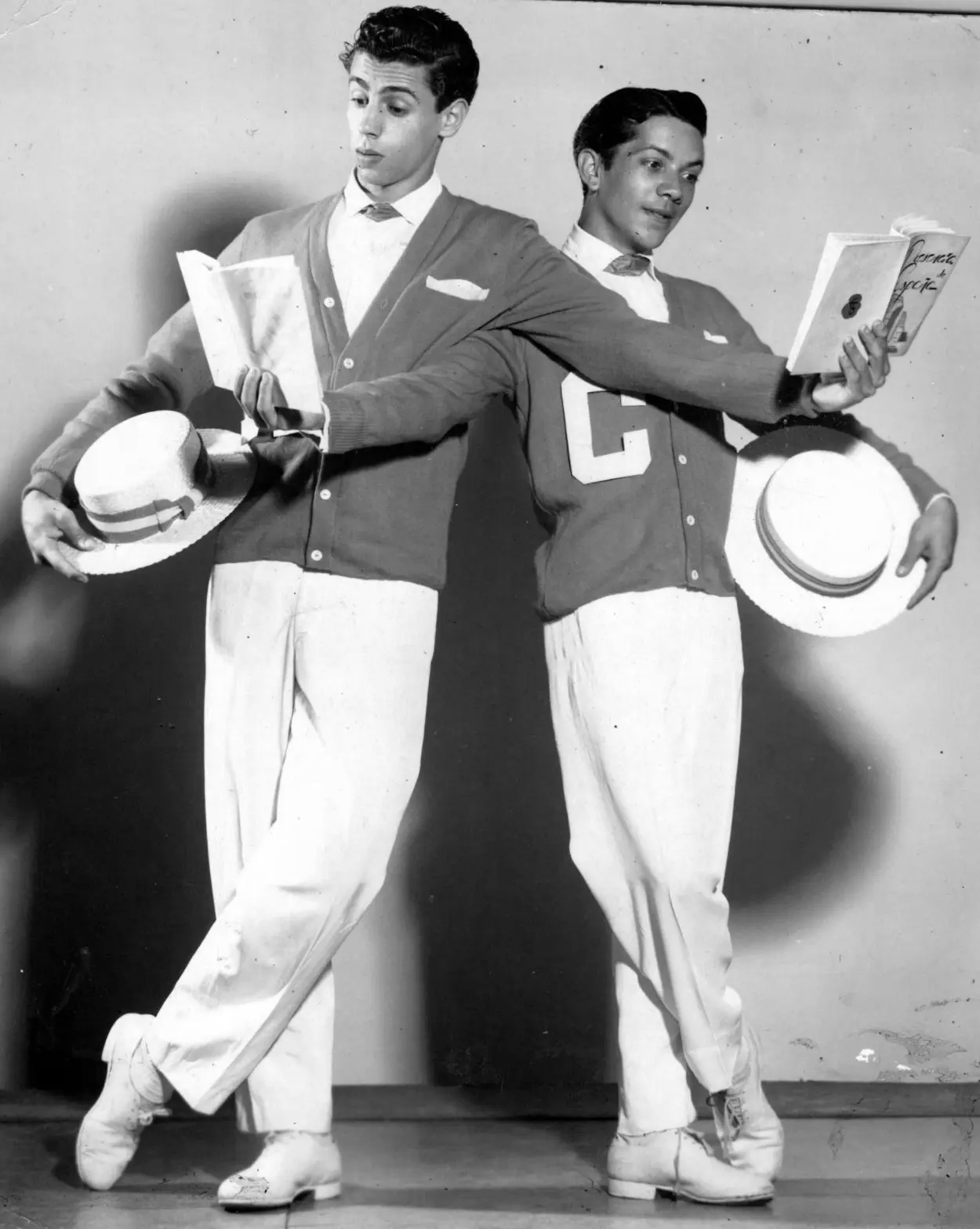
Alfonso Arau and Sergio Corona in the 1950s

Arau has made many appearances as a character actor in American TV series and plays. In the 1972 episode of Gunsmoke titled "Hidalgo", Arau portrayed the bandit "Mando" who shoots and wounds marshal Matt Dillon.

In 1973, Arau acted in and directed Calzónzin Inspector ("Cazonci" or "Caltzontzin" was the term used in the Purépecha culture, to name their emperors), a movie based on a character from the Mexican comic Los Supermachos of Rius, a cartoonist, who co-wrote the screenplay. The movie, which is influenced by Nikolai Gogol's The Government Inspector, centers around two Mexicans who are mistaken for government inspectors from Mexico City by the corrupt mayor of a small town. It is a humorous political critique, aimed squarely at the then ruling party Partido Revolucionario Institucional (PRI) and its paramilitary caciques, at a time when freedom of speech in politics was highly restricted. There are at least two versions of the movie, with one having some scenes deleted by State censors, the most notable of which depicts the killing of a renegade farmer by a police officer, who shoots the farmer in the back.

In December 2004, the Santa Fe Film Festival honored Alfonso Arau for his work in cinema.

In 2010 he directed the Italian-language film, The Trick in the Sheet.

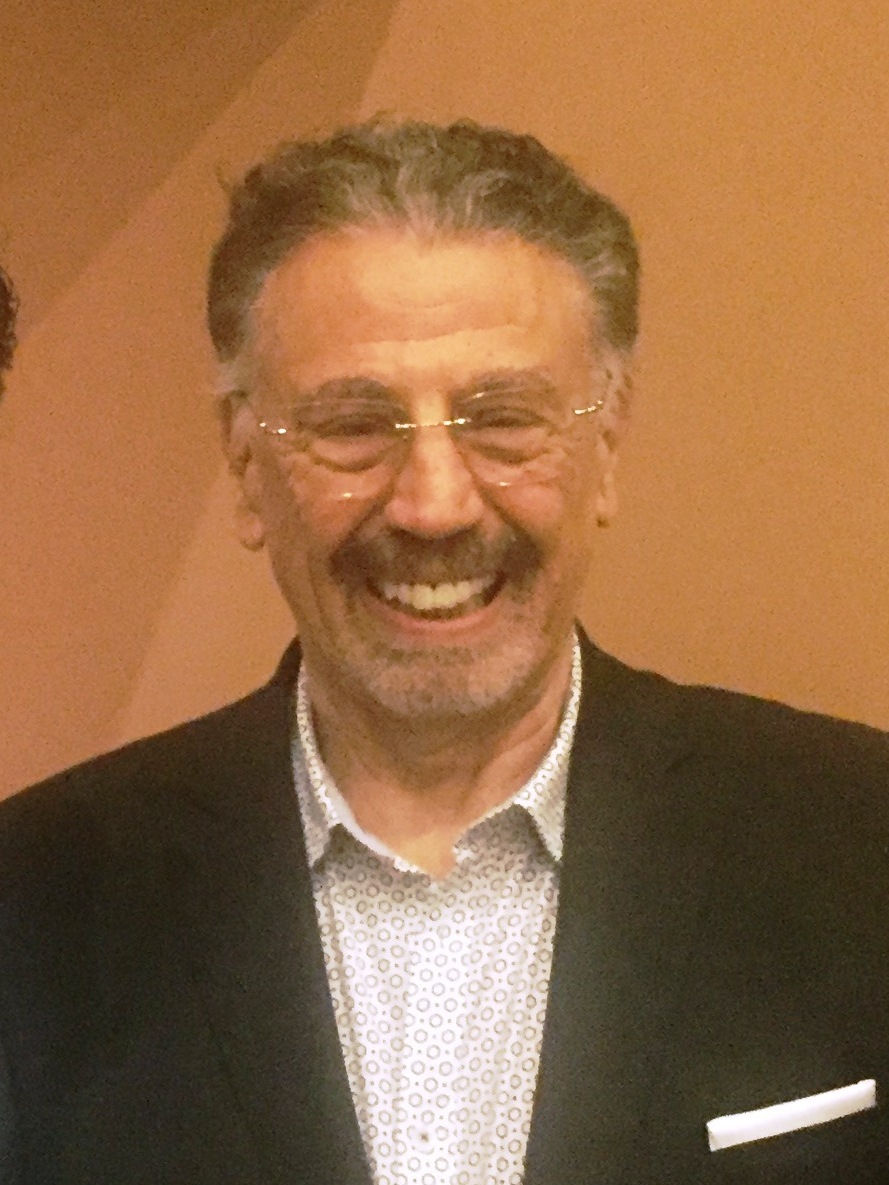
Alfonso Arau in 2016

In January 2011, he starred in Chad, Matt & Rob's The Treasure Hunt: An Interactive Adventure.

In February 2017, it was alleged by Debra Messing that Arau belittled her for her appearance and body in her first film A Walk in the Clouds. Arau later denied the allegation. Messing reinforced these claims during an episode of the PBS documentary Finding Your Roots which aired in February 2025.

== Filmography ==
- 1954 Looks that Kill as Bailarín (uncredited)
- 1954 El casto Susano as (uncredited)
- 1956 Caras nuevas
- 1957 La locura del rock 'n roll as Cristobal
- 1957 Cien muchachas
- 1958 Viaje a la luna as Carlos Vera
- 1958 Música en la noche
- 1960 Los pistolocos
- 1962 … und deine Liebe auch as Alfredo
- 1965 En este pueblo no hay ladrones as Agente Viajero
- 1967 Pedro Páramo as Saltaperico
- 1967 The Jungle Book (voice actor, Latin Spanish dub) as Kaa
- 1968 Operación carambola as Roman Ayala
- 1969 The Wild Bunch as Lieutenant Herrera
- 1969 El aviso inoportuno as Cliente Señorito Del Sastre
- 1970 Tres amigos
- 1970 Jóvenes de la Zona Rosa
- 1970 La vida inútil de Pito Pérez
- 1970 Paraíso as "El Perro"
- 1970 El Topo as Bandido #1
- 1971 Scandalous John as Paco
- 1971 El águila descalza (director, writer) as Poncho / Jonathan Eaglepass / Mascalzzone
- 1971 The Garden of Aunt Isabel
- 1972 Gunsmoke (TV Series) as Mando
- 1972 Bonanza (TV Series) as Simon
- 1972 Run, Cougar, Run as Etio
- 1972 El rincón de las vírgenes as Lucas Lucatero
- 1974 Calzonzin Inspector (director, writer) as Calzonzín
- 1975 Posse as Pepe
- 1975 Tívoli (writer) as Tiliches
- 1976 La palomilla al rescate as (uncredited)
- 1976 Caribe, estrella y aguila (director)
- 1980 Used Cars as Manuel
- 1981 Mojado Power (director, writer) as Nato Solís
- 1982 El día que murió Pedro Infante
- 1984 Romancing the Stone as Juan
- 1986 Redondo
- 1986 Three Amigos as "El Guapo"
- 1986 Chido Guan, el tacos de oro (director, writer)
- 1987 Miami Vice (TV Series) as Jorge Cruz
- 1987 Walker as Raousset
- 1988 227 (TV Series) as Alfonso Gonzales
- 1988 Camino largo a Tijuana
- 1991 Like Water for Chocolate (director)
- 1992 Polvora en la piel
- 1995 A Walk in the Clouds (director)
- 2000 Committed as Grampy
- 2000 Picking Up the Pieces (director) as Dr. Amado
- 2002 The Magnificent Ambersons (TV, director)
- 2003 A Painted House (TV, director)
- 2004 Zapata: El sueño de un héroe (director, writer)
- 2007 El Muerto as Tezcatlipoca (voice)
- 2010 The Trick in the Sheet (director, with Anne Parillaud)
- 2012 I Heart Shakey as Raoul
- 2017 Coco as Papá Julio (voice)
