= Picking Up the Pieces (film) =

- Promotional poster
- Directed by: Alfonso Arau
- Written by: Bill Wilson
- Produced by: Paul Sandberg
- Starring: Woody Allen; David Schwimmer; Kiefer Sutherland; Maria Grazia Cucinotta; Cheech Marin
- Cinematography: Vittorio Storaro
- Edited by: Michael R. Miller
- Music by: Ruy Folguera
- Production companies: Comala Films Productions; Ostensible Productions; The Kushner-Locke Company
- Distributed by: Artisan Entertainment
- Release date: May 26, 2000
- Running time: 95 minutes
- Country: United States
- Language: English

Picking Up the Pieces is a 2000 black comedy film directed by Alfonso Arau and starring Woody Allen, David Schwimmer, Maria Grazia Cucinotta, Kiefer Sutherland, Cheech Marin, and Sharon Stone.

== Plot ==
Tex is a butcher who kills his unfaithful wife Candy. After cutting up the body, Tex buries most of her body parts in the desert in New Mexico. A blind woman accidentally trips over Candy's hand, which has not been buried. Picking it up, her sight is restored, and she proclaims the hand to be the "Hand of the Virgin Mary."

The hand then becomes the talk of the village and people flock there to heal themselves. This ranges from a crippled man growing new legs, a teenager being relieved of his acne and a little person having his manhood enlarged. Tex hears of these miracles, and attempts to retrieve the hand while being pursued by patrol officer Bobo who was one of his wife's lovers.

Eventually, Tex and the officer track down the hand, with Tex's theft of the hand undoing all the miracles that it has performed. While Tex is in prison, he is visited by his wife's spirit, who reveals that, despite her life of whoring and adultery, the suffering she endured with Tex allowed her to get into Heaven, and she arranges for him to get out of his cell so that he can return the hand to the church.

== Cast ==
- Woody Allen as "Tex" Cowley
- David Schwimmer as Father Leo Jerome
- Kiefer Sutherland as Officer Bobo
- Cheech Marin as Mayor Machado
- Maria Grazia Cucinotta as Desi
- Elliott Gould as Father LaCage
- Sharon Stone as Candy Cowley
- Joseph Gordon-Levitt as "Flaco"
- Angélica Aragón as Dolores
- Andy Dick as Father Buñuel
- Alfonso Arau as Dr. Amado
- Mia Maestro as Carla
- Lou Diamond Phillips as Officer Alfonso
- Fran Drescher as Sister Frida
- Eddie Griffin as Sediento
- Kathy Kinney as Mrs. Tattler
- Lupe Ontiveros as Constancia
- Pepe Serna as Florencio
- Richard Edson as Edsel Farkus
- Tony Plana as Usher
- Richard Sarafian as Wino

== Production ==
In an interview, Cheech Marin said that he agreed to make the film because Woody Allen was part of the cast.

When asked by Stig Björkman for the book Woody Allen on Woody Allen why he chose to be in the film, Allen responded that the film "was a lucrative offer." On the production of the film, Allen commented, "I believe if the movie had been made in Spanish or Italian, it might have had a prayer. In English it was an uphill battle for some very nice and talented people."

== Reception ==
Although the film has many movie stars, including Allen's close friend, Elliott Gould, Cheech Marin still called Picking Up the Pieces the worst film he had ever starred in.
