= Mario Iván Martínez =

Mexican actor (born 1962)

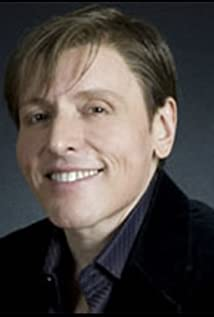
- Born: Mario Iván Martínez Morales; February 17, 1962 (age 64); Mexico City, Mexico
- Education: London Academy of Music and Dramatic Art
- Occupation: Actor
- Years active: 1982-present
- Parent(s): Mario Iván Martínez (deceased); Margarita Isabel (deceased)
- Relatives: Gonzalo Martínez Ortega (uncle); Socorro Bonilla (aunt); Alma Delfina (aunt)
- Awards: Ariel Award for Best Actor
- Website: marioivanmartinez.com

Mario Iván Martínez Morales (born February 17, 1962) is a Mexican actor. He won an Ariel Award for Best Actor for his performance in Like Water for Chocolate (1991).

== Life and career ==
Martínez was born in Mexico City in 1962, the son of radio journalist Mario Iván Martínez Ortega and actress Margarita Isabel. He began his acting career at the age of nine, in the National Theatre Company of Mexico. He studied at the London Academy of Music and Dramatic Art.

== Filmography ==
Telenovelas, Series, Films, Theater
Year	Title	Role	Notes La cage aux folles 2015 Theatrical production Role Albin/Zazá	
1982	El Contrario Luzbel		Theatrical Performance	
1988	A la manera de Shakespeare		Theatrical Performance	
1989	Mi Vida es mi Vida		Theatrical Performance	
1989	La Casa al Final de la Calle		Supporting role	
1989	Teresa	Sigfrido	Supporting role	
1990	Días sin luna	Jaime	Supporting role	
1990	Death and the Compass	Hotel Manager	Film	
1991	The Harvest	Alex	Film	
1991	Madres Egoístas	Iván Escandón	Supporting role	
1991	Like Water for Chocolate	Dr. John Brown	Film	
1992	El Extranjero		Theatrical Performance	
1992	Cronos	Alquimista	Film	
1993	Pueblo Viejo		Film	
1993	La Noche de Epifanía		Theatrical Performance	
1993	1993–1994	Valentina	Maurice Taylor	Supporting role
1994	Sucesos Distantes	Mefisto	Film	
1994	Clear and Present Danger		Film	
1994–1995	El vuelo del águila	Maximilian I of Mexico	Supporting role	
1995	Otelo		Theatrical Performance	
1996	El Beso de la Mujer Araña		Theatrical Performance	
1996	La Antorcha Encendida	Ignacio López Rayón	Co-protagonist	
1996	La culpa	Dr. Castellar	Supporting role	
1997	Pueblo chico, infierno grande	Stefano Onchi	Supporting role	
1998	Molière		Theatrical Performance	
1999	Bécket, o el Honor de Dios		Theatrical Performance	
1999	Otaola o la República del Exilio	Otaola y “El Pirata”	Film	
2000	La casa en la playa	Harry Furman	Supporting role	
2000–2001	Por un beso	Francesco	Supporting role	
2001	Original Sin	Cuban Priest	Film	
2001	La Habitación Azul	Nicolás	Film	
2001	De Monstruos y Prodigios		Theatrical Performance	
2002	La Hija del Caníbal	Werner Jr.	Film	
2003	1822, El Año que fuimos Imperio		Theatrical Performance	
2003	Amor Real	Renato Piquet	Supporting role	
2004	The Librarian: Quest for the Spear	Professor Harris	Film	
2004–present	Un Rato para Imaginar		Theatrical Performance	
2005–2006	Alborada	Singer in the brothel	Special appearance	
2006	Caso terminal	Pablo Ortega	Film	
2008–2009	Mañana es para siempre	Steve Norton	Supporting role	
2010	Ellas son... la alegría del hogar	Sr. Gunther Schneider	TV series	
2010	Gritos de muerte y libertad	Francisco Primo de Verdad y Ramos	TV series	
2010	Los Minondo	Félix María Calleja del Rey	TV series	
2010	Héroes Verdaderos	Napoleon	Voice role	
2012	Suave patria	Mauricio Tavarez	Film	
2012	La Madriguera (Rabbit Hole)		Theatrical Performance	
2012–present	Diario de un loco		Theatrical Performance	
2013	Libre para amarte		Special appearance	
2020	La liga de los 5	Dr. Vampiro	Voice role	

== Awards and nominations ==
Award	Year	Category	Nominee	Result
Premios ACE (New York)	1993	Best Actor in Film	Like Water for Chocolate	Won
Ariel Award	1992	Best Actor	Like Water for Chocolate	Won
Ariel Award	1996	Best Actor in a Minor Role	Sucesos Distantes	Nominated
Ariel Award	2002	Best Supporting Actor	La Habitación Azul	Nominated
TVyNovelas Awards	2010	Best Co-star Actor	Mañana es para siempre	Nominated
