= Mercedes Castro =

Spanish writer

Mercedes Castro Díaz
- Born: 1972 (age 53–54); Ferrol, La Coruña, Spain
- Education: Universidad Autónoma de Madrid
- Occupation: Writer

Mercedes Castro Díaz (born 1972 in Ferrol, La Coruña, Spain) is a Spanish writer.

== Biography ==
She graduated in Law from the Universidad Autónoma de Madrid and worked as a book editor.

Her first novel, Y punto, (2008, Alfaguara) was written over a period of nine years, and received some thirty rave reviews. She believes that women are better able to create crime novels because they are more attentive to the details and psychological profiles of the characters. The author considers that this novel does not belong to the detective genre, and prefers that it be included within contemporary narrative, without ascription to a specific genre. This novel was distinguished as "Best First Opera in Spanish" by the Festival of First Novel of Chambéry (France).

Her second novel, Mantis (2010, Alfaguara), published two years later, is a thriller that mixes psychological intrigue and gothic novel. It was included in the list of the 10 best novels of the year by the literary critic Ricardo Senabre for the supplement El Cultural of the newspaper El Mundo.

Among her signed literary editions are a critical edition of Benito Pérez Galdós' "Trafalgar" (2001), and "Antología poética de Rosalía de Castro" (2004), the first bilingual anthology of Rosalía de Castro published. Her first published work was the collection of poems La niña en rebajas (2001).

She lives in the city of Madrid.

== Novel ==
- Y punto (And that's it). (2008, Alfaguara)
- Mantis (2010, Alfaguara)

== Critical editions ==
- Trafalgar, by Benito Pérez Galdós (2001, Edaf), edition and prologue.
- Poetic Anthology by Rosalía de Castro (2004, Edaf), bilingual edition and translation (Galician-Spanish).

== Poetry ==
La niña en rebajas (2001, Sociedad de Cultura Valle-Inclán de Ferrol), poetry book.

== Interviews ==
- El País, La vida cotidiana en la novela policiaca
- Digital interviews in El País
- Radio Cadena SER
