= Lumi Cavazos =

Mexican actress

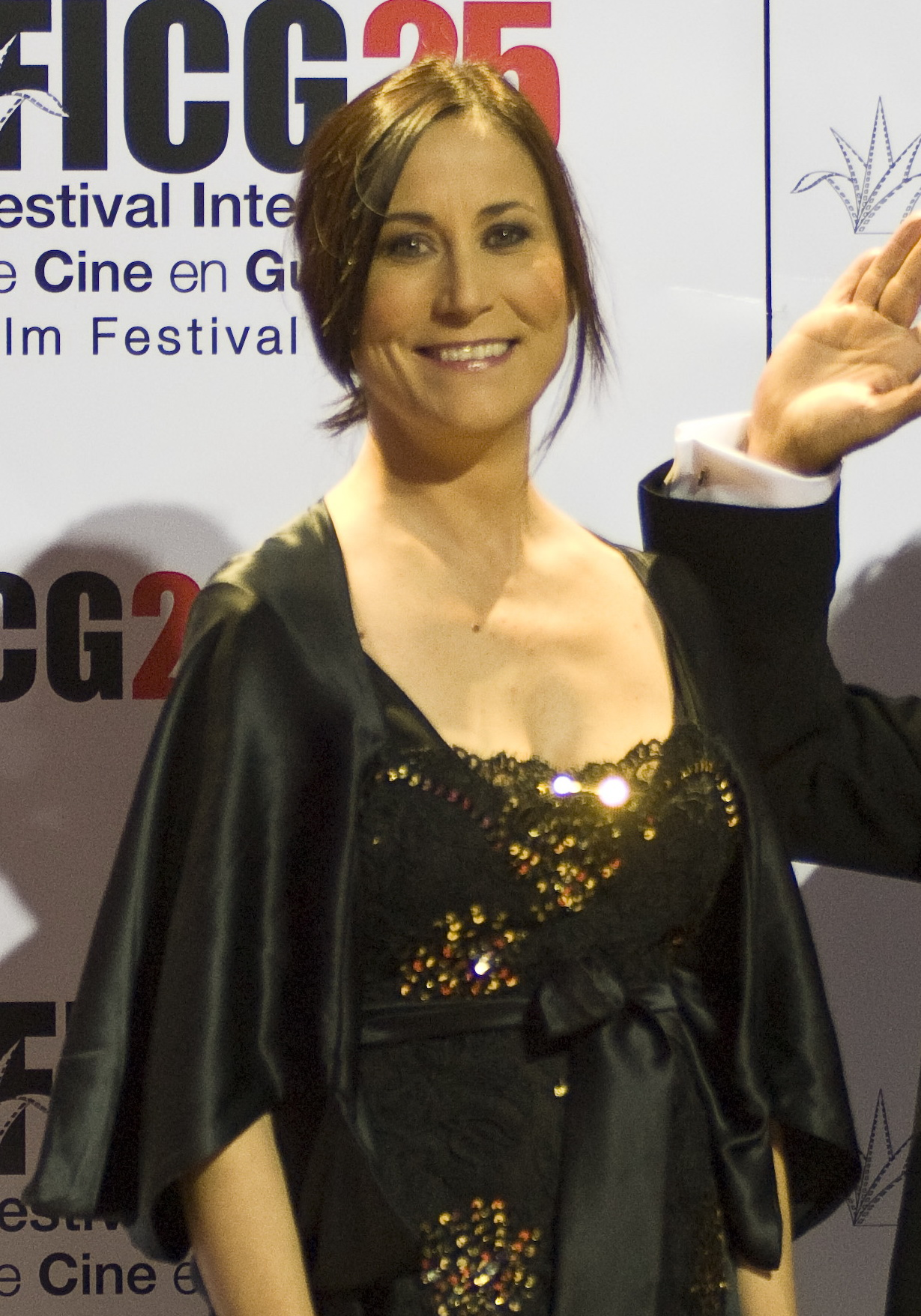
- Cavazos in 2010
- Born: 21 December 1968 (age 57); Monterrey, Nuevo Leon, Mexico
- Occupation: Actress
- Years active: 1984–present
- Spouse(s): Marco Leonardi (1991–1999) Jose Rangel (m. 1999)
- Children: 2

Luz Maria Cavazos (born 21 December 1968) is a Mexican actress. She won Best Actress awards at the Tokyo Film Festival, and Brazil's Festival de Gramado for her portrayal of Tita in the 1991 film Like Water for Chocolate. The film received the attention of US film critics and moviegoers, and facilitated her entry into the American film industry. She subsequently relocated to Los Angeles.

== Early life and career ==
Cavazos was born in Monterrey, Mexico. She began her acting career at the age of 15. In 1985, she was a student at Guadalajara's Preparatoria 4 University. She later chose to enroll in the Centro Universitario de Teatro UNAM in 1990. She left her parents and nine siblings to pursue her own interests. She made her film debut in Busi Cortés's 1988 El Secreto de Romalia. She has acted in numerous Mexican films and television series since then, and has also done a fair amount of work in the U.S., appearing in television dramas and a singing role in the film Sugar Town. Cavazos is sometimes credited as "Rosita Lumi Cavazos".

She had a featured role in Bottle Rocket, the debut film of director Wes Anderson.

She also played the character Tita for the movie Like Water for Chocolate.

== Personal life ==
She was dating one of her co-stars in the film Like Water for Chocolate, Marco Leonardi, from 1991 to 1999.

She is married to Joselo Rangel of the band Cafe Tacvba, with whom she has two daughters. They married in July 1999.

== Filmography ==
- En un bosque de la China (1987)
- El túnel de la ciencia (1989) (Documentary) .... herself
- Like Water for Chocolate (1991) .... Tita
- Serpientes y escaleras (1992) .... Rebeca
- Mi primer año (1992)
- Fray Bartolomé de las Casas (1993)
- Tres Destinos (1993) TV .... Cristina
- Del otro lado del mar (1994)
- Manhattan Merengue (1995) (as Rosita Lumi Cavazes)
- Banditi (1995)
- Viva San Isidro (1995) .... Antonia
- Bottle Rocket (1996) .... Inez
- Land of Milk and Honey (1996) .... Rosie
- El Vuelo del águila (1996) TV .... Amada Díaz
- Last Stand at Saber River (1997) TV .... Luz
- Sístole Diástole (1997) .... La nena
- Fibra óptica (1998) .... María Ponce
- Máscara (1999) .... Laura
- Sugar Town (1999) .... Rocío
- Entre la tarde y la noche (1999)
- The Keening (1999) .... Wood Nymph
- Bless the Child (2000) .... Sister Rosa
- Atlético San Pancho (2001) .... Rebeca
- In the Time of the Butterflies (2001) (TV) .... Patria Mirabal
- Exposed (2003) .... Laura Silvera
- Entre dos (2003)
- Tan infinito como el desierto (2004) TV
- 7 días (2005) .... Sra. Garza
- La Ley del silencio (2005) TV .... Clemencia
- Las Buenrostro (2005)
- Viva High School Musical: Mexico (2008)
- La Mitad del Mundo (2009).... Juana
- Rock Mari (2010)
- 2 Gritos de muerte y libertad (2010)....Josefa de Ortiz Dominguez
- Once upon a time in Durango (2010)
- Por Siempre Joan Sebestian (2016).... Cecilia
- The Promise.... (2018)
- Olimpia (2018)... Hernán's mother
- This is not Berlin (2019)... Susana
- The Devils Mark (2020)
- Cecilia (2021)
- Siempre Madre: Paraiso en pugna (2022)
