= Like Water for Chocolate (novel) =

1989 Mexican novel by Laura Esquivel

- U.S. book cover
- Author: Laura Esquivel
- Original title: Como agua para chocolate
- Translator: Carol and Thomas Christensen
- Language: Spanish
- Genre: Romance, Magical realism, Tragedy
- Publisher: 1989 (Mexico); Doubleday, 1992; Perfection Learning, 1995 (U.S)
- Publication place: Mexico
- Pages: 256 (Spanish)
- ISBN: 978-0385721233 (Spanish); ISBN 978-0780739079 (English)

Like Water for Chocolate (Spanish: Como agua para chocolate) is a 1989 novel by Mexican novelist and screenwriter Laura Esquivel. It was first published in Mexico in 1989. The English version of the novel was published in 1992.

The novel follows the story of a young woman named Tita, who longs for her beloved, Pedro, but can never have him because of her mother's upholding of the family tradition: the youngest daughter cannot marry, but instead must take care of her mother until she dies. Tita is only able to express herself when she cooks.

The book has inspired a 1992 film of the same name, a 2022 ballet, and a 2024 TV series; 2 sequels were written by Esquivel. It was named by Spanish periodical El Mundo as one of the best Spanish-language novels of the 20th century.

== Plot ==
Fifteen-year-old Josefita "Tita" de la Garza lives on a ranch in Piedras Negras with her domineering mother, Mama Elena, her older sisters Gertrudis and Rosaura, and Nacha, the ranch cook. Tita has a deep connection with food and cooking thanks to Nacha, who was Tita's primary caretaker growing up.

Tita falls in love with their neighbor Pedro Muzquiz. Pedro, who loves Tita in return, asks Mama Elena for Tita's hand in marriage. However, Mama Elena forbids it, as according to a tradition of the de la Garza family, the youngest daughter must remain single and take care of her mother until her death. She suggests that Pedro marry Rosaura instead. In order to stay close to Tita, Pedro decides to follow this advice.

While preparing Rosaura's wedding cake, Tita is overcome with sadness, and cries into the cake batter. Nacha tries the cake batter, and suddenly is overcome with grief at the memory of her lost love, and is too ill to attend the wedding. At the wedding, everyone except for Tita gets violently sick after eating the wedding cake. After the wedding, Tita finds Nacha lying dead on her bed, holding a picture of her fiancé.

Tita pours her intense emotions into her cooking, unintentionally affecting those around her. After Tita makes quail in rose petal sauce for dinner one evening (flavored with her erotic thoughts of Pedro), Gertrudis becomes so inflamed with lust that she sweats pink, rose-scented sweat; when she goes to cool off in the shower, her body gives off so much heat that the shower's tank water evaporates before reaching her body and the shower itself catches fire. As Gertrudis runs out of the burning shower naked, she is carried away on horseback by revolutionary captain Juan Alejandrez, who is drawn to her from the battlefield by her rosy scent; they have sex atop Juan's horse as they gallop away from the ranch. Gertrudis is later revealed to be working as a prostitute in a brothel on the border and is subsequently disowned by her mother. Eventually, Juan and Gertrudis marry.

Rosaura gives birth to a son, Roberto. She is unable to nurse him while recovering from pregnancy complications, so Tita tries to feed Roberto herself. Miraculously, she begins producing breast milk and is able to nurse Roberto. This brings her and Pedro closer than ever. They begin meeting secretly around the ranch.

Rosaura, Pedro and Roberto move to San Antonio at Mama Elena's insistence, who suspects a relationship between Tita and Pedro. Roberto dies soon after the move. Upon hearing of her nephew's death, Tita loses her mind and secludes herself in the dovecote until John Brown, the widowed family doctor, arrives at Mama Elena's request to have him take Tita to an insane asylum. Instead, John takes her back to his home to live with him and his young son, Alex.

Tita and John soon fall in love, but her underlying feelings for Pedro do not waver. At the ranch, a group of bandits attack the ranch and paralyze Mama Elena. Tita returns to take care of Mama Elena. However, Mama Elena is paranoid that she is poisoning her out of spite and begins drinking ipecac to induce vomiting, making her sickly and causing her death.

After Mama Elena’s death, Tita accepts John’s marriage proposal. Pedro, Rosaura, and their daughter Esperanza return to Mexico, and Tita loses her virginity to him. She grows anxious that she is pregnant with his child. Her mother's ghost haunts her, telling her that she and her unborn child are cursed. Tita confirms that she is not pregnant and banishes her mother's ghost from her life for good, but the ghost takes revenge by setting Pedro on fire, leaving him badly burnt and bedridden, although he recovers. Tita rejects John, informing him that she cannot marry him due to her affair with Pedro.

Many years later, Alex Brown and Esperanza get married. During the wedding, Pedro proposes to Tita. Tita accepts, but Pedro dies when they have sex after the wedding. Tita is overcome with sorrow and eats a box of candles. The candles are sparked by the heat of Pedro's memory, creating a spectacular fire that consumes the entire ranch. The only thing that survives the fire is Tita's cookbook, which is passed on to the narrator, Esperanza's daughter.

== Themes ==
=== The role of women ===
The novel is a parody of periodicals published for women during the 19th century. These periodicals would publish fiction for women, alongside recipes and advice for homemaking. The ideal of womanhood as represented in the book is a woman who is stronger and more clever than the men in her life, pious, and who is in control of food and sex, as embodied by Mama Elena; Gertrudis and Tita subvert the ideal, while Rosaura tries and fails to uphold the ideal.

=== Symbolism of birds ===
Bird symbolism is found extensively throughout the novel. Yael Halevi-Wise argues that Esquivel in the novel uses capons to symbolize Mama Elena's influence on Tita and Pedro - that of spiritual castration, in the way that she forces both to bow down to her will, and does not allow Tita to realize or consummate her love with Pedro. Additionally, Tita believes she hears a chick inside a preserved egg but finds that the egg is just an egg; Victoria Martínez connects this to Tita's unfulfilled desire to marry and procreate. Tita compares herself to a quail she fails to kill in one stroke, as she feels that Mama Elena has been slowly killing her all her life but refusing to do it in one stroke.

=== Rebellion ===
Tita is born in the kitchen—a place that foreshadows her calling. Due to the tradition that requires the youngest daughter to care for her mother, Mama Elena forbids Tita from falling in love, marrying, or becoming pregnant, forcing her to work in the kitchen. As she becomes a young woman, Tita appears to conform to the gender role her mother expects; however, Tita rebels, creatively devising a way in which she can express her suppressed feelings and emotions through her cooking. She has the magical ability to send her desires and emotions into the food she prepares. Tita bakes the wedding cake for her sister Rosaura and the man she wishes she was marrying, Pedro. Deeply depressed about the fact that her sister is marrying her one true love, she places her feelings of despair and sadness into the wedding cake. When the guests eat the cake, they weep over their lost loves and eventually became intoxicated and sick. Another example of her inclusion of suppressed emotions into her cooking is when Tita’s blood infects the rose sauce and quail dinner that she serves to Pedro, Rosaura, and Gertrudis. Rosaura becomes physically ill while Getrudis is instantly aroused. Finally, as a result of Pedro devouring this food, he becomes aware of Tita’s feelings and has a better understanding of the passion and love that she has for him. Even though Tita is not allowed to share her intimate feelings, she conveys her passions to the world through the action of cooking and sharing her food.

Scholars have questioned the effectiveness of rebellion in the novel. John H. Sinnegen writes that Tita's rebellion "ends in a reconciliation with bourgeois, U.S.– style patriarchy". Victoria Martínez writes that Tita's fight against Mama Elena is meant to reflect the fight against the Porfiriato, leading the reader to expect liberation, but in fact, Tita is never truly liberated.

== Publication history ==
Like Water for Chocolate has been translated from the original Spanish into numerous languages; the English translation is by Carol and Thomas Christensen. The novel has sold close to a million copies in Spain and Hispanic America and at last count, in 1993, more than 202,000 copies in the United States.

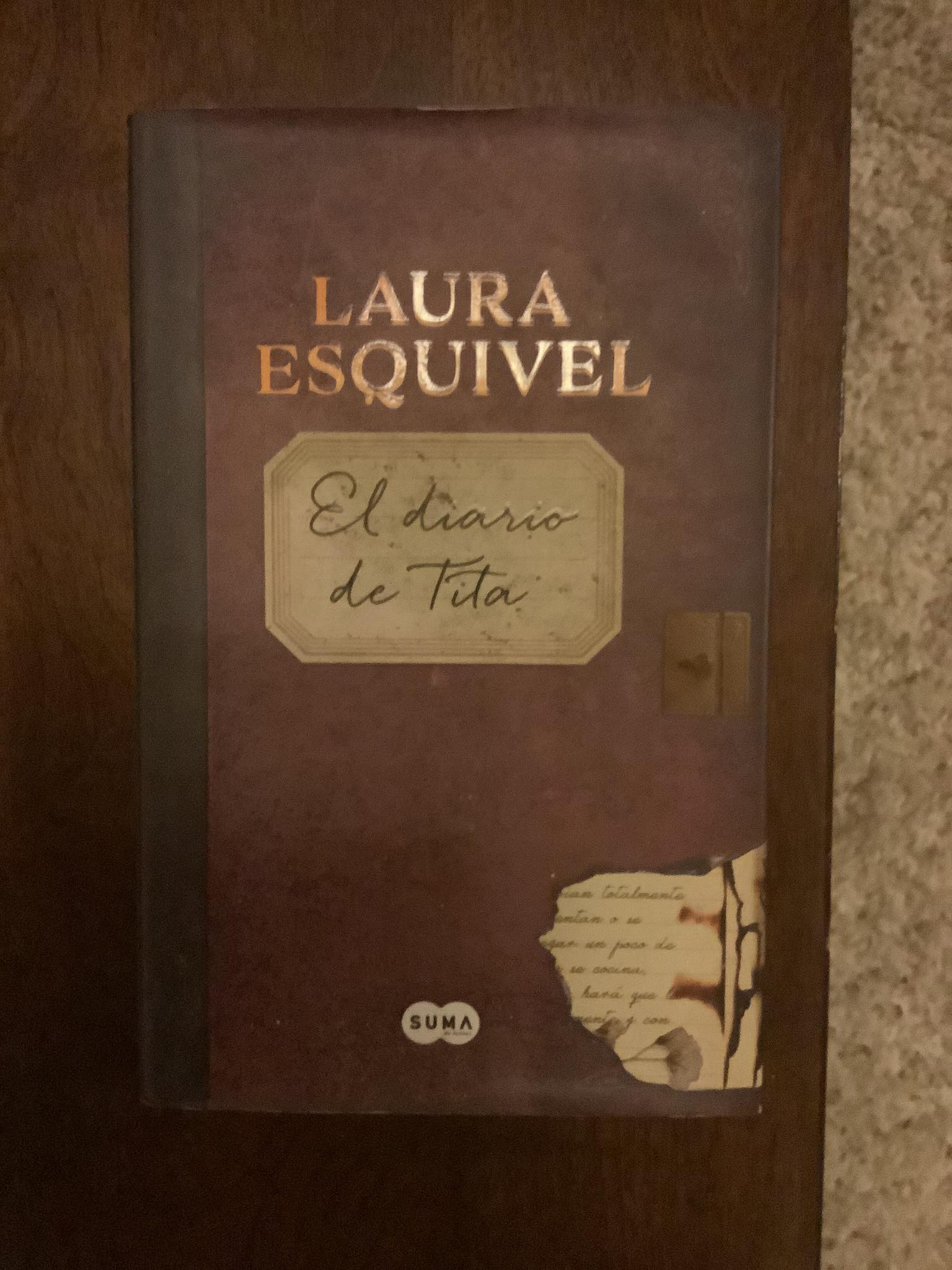
2016 publication, published by Litográfica Ingramex

In 2016, a second part was released for Like Water for Chocolate. titled Tita's Diary (Spanish: El diario de Tita). Tita's Diary further explores the life of Tita. A third book, The Colors of My Past (Spanish: Mi negro pasado, lit. 'My black past') was released in 2017. The Colors of My Past follows María, a descendant of Pedro and Rosaura, who discovers Tita's diary.

== Adaptations ==
The novel was made into a film of the same name, Like Water for Chocolate, by Alfonso Arau in 1992, starring Lumi Cavazos as Tita, Marco Leonardi as Pedro, and Regina Torné as Mama Elena.

A ballet based on the novel was created by Christopher Wheeldon and Joby Talbot in 2022. Mexican conductor Alondra de la Parra served as consultant on the ballet. It had its world premiere at the Royal Ballet on 2 June 2022, with Francesca Hayward as Tita, Marcelino Sambé as Pedro, Laura Morera as Mama Elena, Mayara Magri as Rosaura, Anna Rose O'Sullivan as Gertrudis, and Matthew Ball as John Brown. It premiered in the US at the American Ballet Theatre on 29 March 2023 and starred Cassandra Trenary as Tita, Herman Cornejo as Pedro, Christine Shevchenko as Mama Elena, Hee Seo as Rosaura, Catherine Hurlin as Gertrudis, and Cory Stearns as John Brown. The ballet received largely positive reviews.

As of 2020, a musical was in production. La Santa Cecilia is set to write the music, with lyrics by Quiara Alegría Hudes, libretto by Lisa Loomer, and direction provided by Michael Mayer.

In 2024, HBO announced a six-part adaptation for television. Executively produced by Salma Hayek and starring Azul Guaita as Tita, Andrés Baida as Pedro, and Irene Azuela as Mama Elena, Like Water for Chocolate received positive reviews. It was renewed for a second and final season in December of that year, and premiered on HBO Max on February 15, 2026.
