= Robert Shemin =

American real estate investor and author

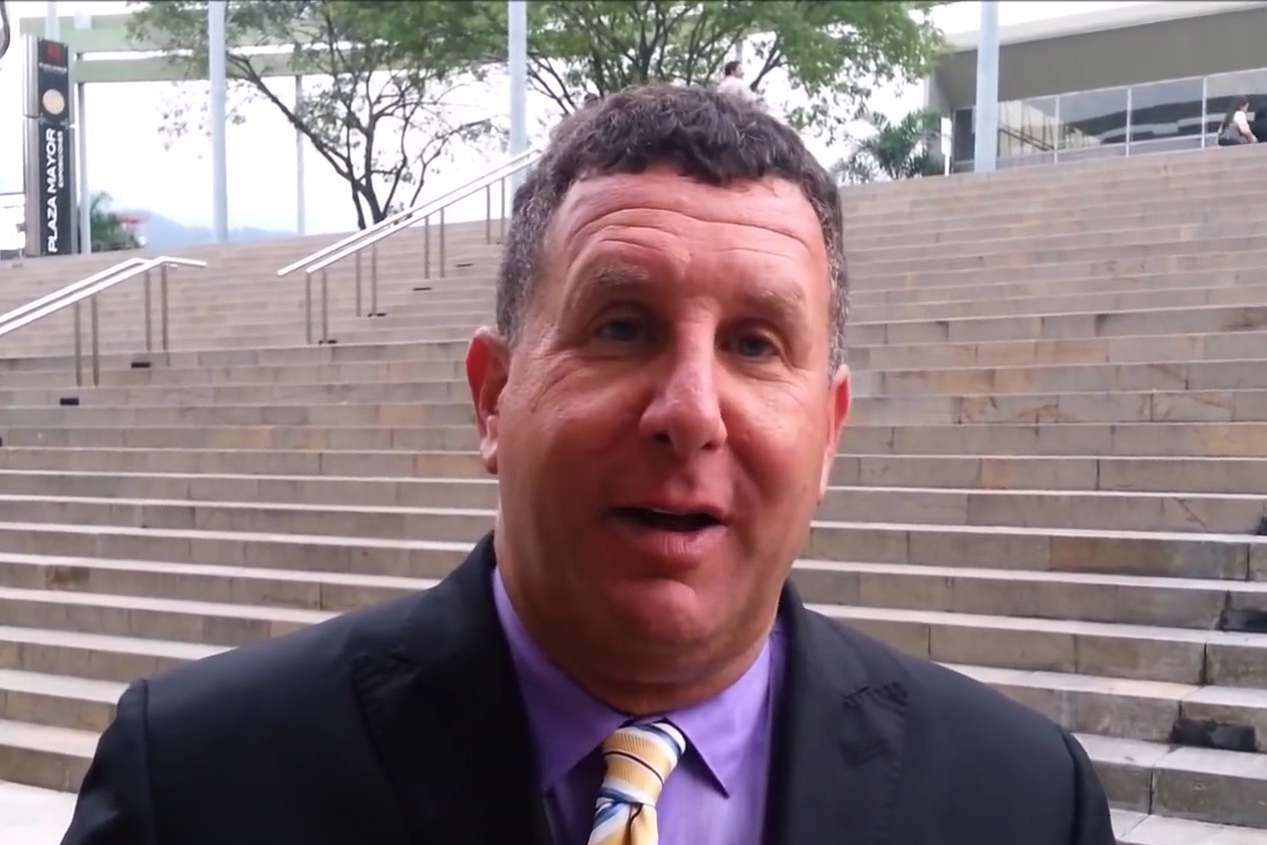
- Education: Vanderbilt University (BA); Emory University (MBA); Emory University (JD)
- Occupations: Author, Real Estate Investor, Attorney
- Writing career
- Language: English
- Subject: Real estate investment
- Website: Official website

Robert D. Shemin is an American real estate investor and author.

== Investing career ==
Shemin graduated from the joint law and MBA degree program at Emory University. After law school he worked at the Inter-American Court of Human Rights in Costa Rica, and in the investment industry, he worked for Goldman Sachs & Co. in securities sales. Shemin purchased his first property at the age of twenty-nine. Within six years, in 1996, he owned 120 rental properties in the Nashville area. In 1998, twenty-six of Shemin's properties were damaged by tornados. While the insurance company initially refused to pay for the damage, Shemin was able to successfully appeal the legal basis of their refusal and receive payment.

== Books ==
Shemin's first two books were "Honest Profits: Your Hands-on Guide to Successful Real Estate Investing" and "The Renters Rights Handbook". He then continued to write "Successful Real Estate Investing". Following its publication Shemin provided on-air answers to the questions of call-in viewers for television networks such as CNN and Fox News. He has since spoken before audiences in several countries.

He is also the author of "How Come That Idiot's Rich and I'm Not", which was a New York Times best-seller. The Boston Globe reviewed the book, stating that, "Shemin lays out a plan of eight money-making secrets, all the while stressing that money doesn't matter as much as love and happiness. Wealth is a state of mind, he insists, and his suggestions for achieving it, while mostly common sense, are doable and helpful … What's best about this book is the charismatic Shemin's wit and support, making feeling good about yourself a priceless benefit."

"Secrets of a Millionaire Real Estate Investor" was also a best-seller for Shemin. Other books by Shemin include "Secrets Of A Millionaire Landlord" and "40 Days to Success in Real Estate Investing". He has spoken in support of his books to live audiences, and has been interviewed about real estate for about three hundred different articles.

== Bibliography ==
- Honest Profits: Your Hands on Guide to Successful Real Estate Investing (1996) ISBN 978-0964915305
- Secrets of a Millionaire Real Estate Investor (2000) ISBN 978-0793137053
- Secrets of a Millionaire Landlord (2001) ISBN 978-0793148257
- Secrets of Buying & Selling Real Estate ... Without Using Your Own Money (2003) ISBN 978-0471449249
- The Renter's rights Handbook
- Secrets of the Millionaires
- Systems for Success
- Successful Real Estate Investing: How to Avoid the 75 Most Costly Mistakes Every Investor Makes (2003) ISBN 978-0471453970
- The Magic of High Quality questions
- The Learning Annex Presents Making Money in Real Estate: A Smarter Approach to Real Estate Investing (2004) ISBN 978-0471697466
- Unlimited Riches (2004) ISBN 978-0471675006
- 40 Days to Success in Real Estate Investing (2005) ISBN 978-0471694823
- How Come That Idiot's Rich & I'm Not? (2009) ISBN 978-0307395085
- The 7 S.E.C.R.E.T.S. Of The Money Masters (2010) ISBN 978-0470615188
- Living the Significant Life (2012) ISBN 978-0470641255
