= Laura Esquivel =

Mexican writer and politician

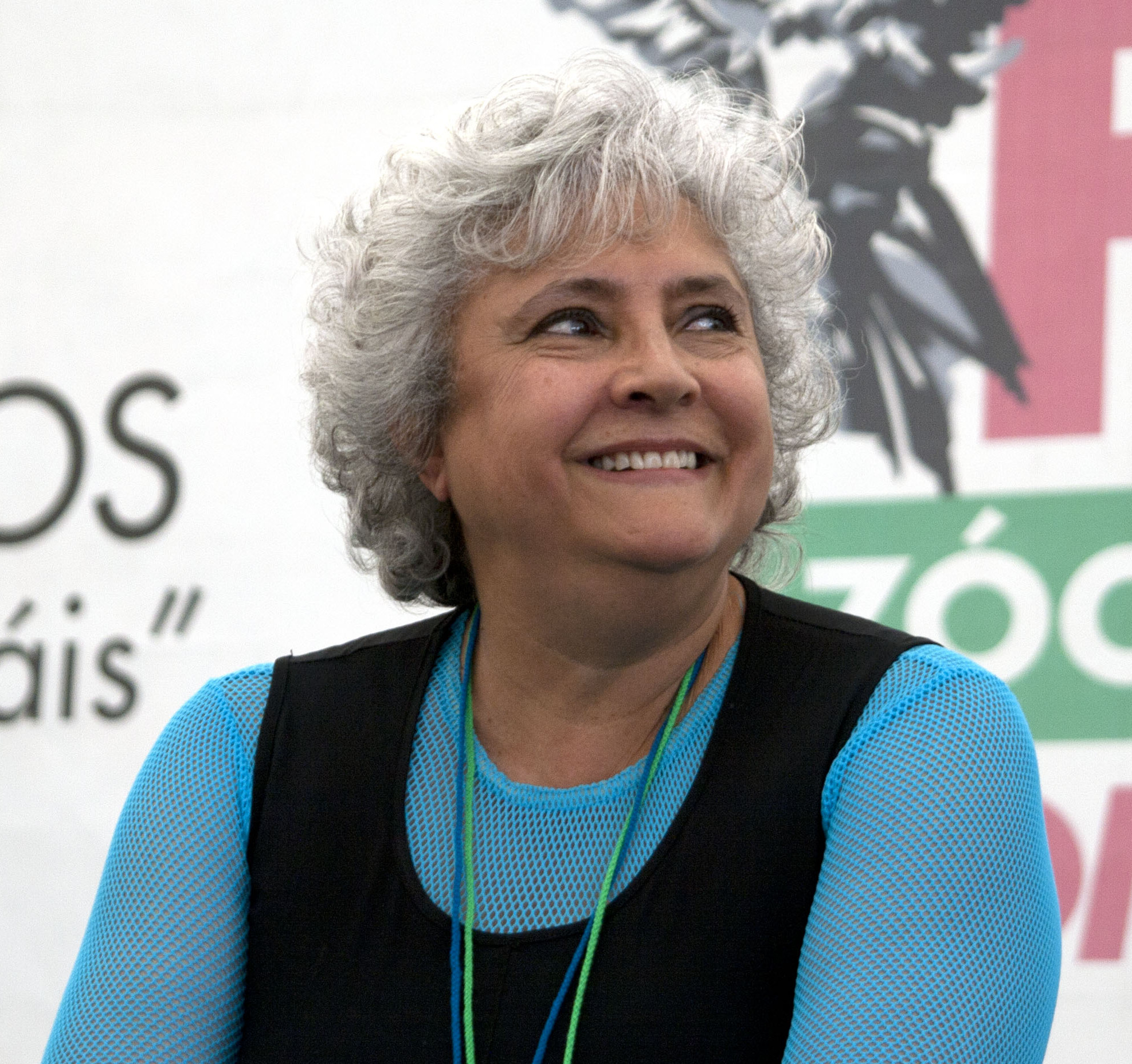
- Laura Esquivel in Mexico City in 2013
- Born: 30 September 1950 (age 76); Cuauhtémoc, Mexico City, Mexico
- Occupations: Novelist, screenwriter
- Writing career
- Genres: Magical realism, science fiction

Laura Beatriz Esquivel Valdés (born 30 September 1950) is a Mexican novelist, screenwriter and former politician. Her first novel Como agua para chocolate (Like Water for Chocolate) became a bestseller in Mexico and the United States, and was later developed into an award-winning film.

== Literary career ==
Esquivel studied Theatre and Dramatic Creation at the Centro de Arte Dramático A.C. (CADAC), specialising in Children's Theatre. She is qualified in Pre-School Education (1966–1968), as an Instructor of Theatre Workshops and Children's Literature (1997), Script Assessment in Tlaxcala and Oaxaca (1998–2002) and as an Instructor of Workshops of Writing Laboratories in Oaxaca, Michoacán and Spain (1999).

Between 1970 and 1980 she wrote the script for children's programmes for Mexican television, and in 1983, she founded the Centro de Invención Permanente, and took on its technical direction.

Esquivel's work in television motivated her to dedicate herself to writing scripts for cinema. This was when she decided to write her novel Like Water for Chocolate, released in 1989, which came to be a great success.

In her novels, Esquivel uses magical realism to combine the ordinary and the supernatural, with narrative devices similar to those used by Cuban author Alejo Carpentier as "el real maravilloso", Colombian author Gabriel García Márquez and Chilean author Isabel Allende. Her most famous novel, Como agua para chocolate, (1989) is set during the Mexican Revolution of the early 20th century and features the importance of the kitchen and food in the life of its female protagonist, Tita. The novel is structured as a year of monthly issues of an old-style women's magazine containing recipes, home remedies, and love stories, and each chapter ("January," "February," "March," etc.) opens with the redaction of a traditional Mexican recipe followed by instructions for preparation. Each recipe recalls to the narrator a significant event in the protagonist's life.

Esquivel has stated that she believes that the kitchen is the most important part of the house and characterizes it as a source of knowledge and understanding that brings pleasure. The title Como agua para chocolate is a phrase used in Mexico to refer to someone whose emotions are about to "boil", because water for chocolate must be just at the boil when the chocolate is added and beaten. The idea for the novel came to Esquivel "while she was cooking the recipes of her mother and grandmother." Reportedly, "Esquivel used an episode from her own family to write her book. She had a great-aunt named Tita who was forbidden to wed and spent her life caring for her mother. Soon after her mother died, so did Tita."

According to Esquivel critic Elizabeth M. Willingham, despite the fact that the novel was poorly received critically in Mexico, Como agua para chocolate "created a single-author economic boom, unprecedented in Mexican literature or film of any period by any author" and "went into second and third printings in the first year of its release and reached the second place in sales in 1989" and "became Mexico’s 'bestseller' in 1990". The novel has been translated into more than 20 languages."

Like Water for Chocolate was developed into a film which premiered in 1992, concurrently with the book's English translation by Carol Christensen and Thomas Christensen. In the United States, Like Water for Chocolate became one of the largest grossing foreign films ever released. The film "dominated" Mexico's film awards and received ten Ariel Awards and, according to Susan Karlin in Variety (1993), the fine-tuned final version of the film garnered "'nearly two dozen' international awards".

In 1994 Esquivel won American Booksellers Book of the Year (ABBY) Award for Como agua para chocolate, the first non-US writer to be a recipient of it.

Esquivel's second novel, La ley del amor (Mexico City: Grijalbo 1995), translated as The Law of Love (trans. Margaret Sayers Peden, Crown–Random, 1996), is described by literary critic Lydia H. Rodríguez as a "narrative [that] deconstructs the present to create a twenty-third century where remarkable invention and familiar elements populate a gymnastically-paced text" whose "conflicts . . . set the Law of Love (as a cosmic philosophy) in motion" Literary critic Elizabeth Coonrod Martínez cautions, "Although Esquivel merges science fiction trappings with a love story in the novel, . . . [the author] attempts a blueprint for a harmonious future that remains beyond the experience of present societies, a future anchored by a central philosophy that individual wholeness can be achieved only by participation in and on behalf of the community".

Esquivel's non-fiction compilation Between Two Fires (NY: Crown, 2000) featured essays on life, love, and food.

Esquivel's third novel, Tan veloz como el deseo (Barcelona: Plaza y Janés, 2001), translated into English as Swift as Desire (Trans. Stephen A. Lytle. NY: Crown-Random, 2001), is set in Mexico City the apartment of Lluvia, a middle-aged divorcée caring for her debilitated father, Júbilo, a former telegraph operator born with a gift for understanding what people want to say rather than what they actually say. For the first time in this novel, according to critic Willingham, "Esquivel asks the reader to consider Mexico’s historical dialogue and [its] enduring truths" in a contemporary setting in which the characters seek a meaningful and lasting reconciliation that rises above historical errors and misunderstandings.

Esquivel's fourth novel Malinche: novela (NY: Atria, 2006), translated as Malinche: A Novel (Trans. Ernesto Mestre-Reed. NY: Atria, 2006), adopts "Malinalli" as the name of the title character, also known as "Doña Marina," whose pejorative title "La Malinche" means "the woman of Malinche," the Aztecs' (Nahuatl) name for Spaniard Hernán Cortés According to critic Ryan Long, Esquivel's naming of her title character and her novel "reflects upon the diverse and unpredictable revisions that [Malinalli/La Malinche's] mythical identity has undergone continuously since the period of the Conquest. . . . seek[ing] a middle ground between Malinalli’s autonomy and Malinche’s predetermination" The novel's book jacket features an Aztec-style codex designed and executed by Jordi Castells) printed on its interior surface that is meant to represent Malinalli's diary.

Esquivel's most recent novels are A Lupita le gusta planchar (2014 SUMA, Madrid) and El diario de Tita (May 2016 Penguin Random House Grupo Editorial, Barcelona). The former has been translated into English as Pierced by the Sun (Trans. Jordi Castells. Amazon Crossing, Seattle 2016).

Esquivel was a co-founder of the production company, the "Tequila Gang" together with filmmakers Guillermo del Toro, Alfonso Cuaron, producer Berta Navarro and sales agent Rosa Bosch.

== Personal life ==
Laura Beatriz Esquivel Valdés was born the third of four children to Julio César Esquivel, a telegraph operator, and Josefa Valdés, a homemaker. Her father's death in 1999 was the inspiration for Tan veloz como el deseo. Trained as a teacher, Esquivel founded a children's theater workshop and wrote and produced dramas for children.

In 1975 she married actor, producer, and director Alfonso Arau, with whom she collaborated on several films. They separated in 1993. She sued Arau over the rights of Como agua para chocolate in 1995. Arau countersued her shortly afterwards. Esquivel and her present husband live in Mexico City.

In March 2009 Laura Esquivel ran as preliminary candidate of the Local Council in District XXVII of Mexico City for the Party of the Democratic Revolution (PRD). Her candidacy was supported by the current Izquierda Unida, which combined various PRD groups. In 2015, she was elected to the Chamber of Deputies for the Morena Party as a plurinominal deputy. She has also served as head of the Mexico City Cultural Committee and member of the Science & Technology and Environmental Committees for the Morena Party.

== Awards ==
- 1994 American Booksellers Book of the Year (ABBY) Award for Like Water for Chocolate
- 2004 Giussepe Acerbi Literary Award for Swift as Desire
- 2008 Audie Award for Spanish Language Title by the Audio Publishers Association for the Malinche audiobook.

== Works ==
- Como agua para chocolate (1989) (English: Like Water for Chocolate)
- La ley del amor (1995) (English: The Law of Love)
- Íntimas suculencias (1998)
- Estrellita marinera (1999)
- El libro de las emociones (2000)
- Tan veloz como el deseo (2001) (English: Swift as Desire)
- Malinche (2006) (English: Malinche: A Novel)
- Escribiendo la nueva historia (2014)
- A Lupita le gustaba planchar (2014) (English: Pierced by the Sun)
- El diario de Tita (2016)
- Mi negro pasado (2017)
