= Like Water for Chocolate (film) =

- Directed by: Alfonso Arau
- Screenplay by: Laura Esquivel
- Based on: Like Water for Chocolate by Laura Esquivel
- Produced by: Alfonso Arau
- Starring: Marco Leonardi; Lumi Cavazos; Regina Torné; Ada Carrasco; Mario Iván Martínez; Yareli Arizmendi
- Cinematography: Steven Bernstein; Emmanuel Lubezki
- Edited by: Carlos Bolado; Francisco Chiu
- Music by: Leo Brouwer
- Distributed by: Miramax
- Release dates: 29 November 1991 (Muestra internacional de cine); 16 April 1962 (Mexico)
- Running time: 105 minutes (USA), 143 minutes (original cut)
- Country: Mexico
- Languages: Spanish; English
- Budget: $2 million (USA)
- Box office: $21.6 million (USA)

Like Water for Chocolate (Spanish: Como agua para chocolate) is a 1991 Mexican romantic drama film produced and directed by Alfonso Arau, and written by Laura Esquivel, who adapted her 1989 debut novel. It earned 10 Ariel Awards including the Best Picture, and was nominated for a Golden Globe Award for Best Foreign Language Film. The film became the highest-grossing foreign-language film ever released in the United States at the time. The film was selected as the Mexican entry for the Best Foreign Language Film at the 65th Academy Awards, but was not accepted as a nominee.

== Plot ==
A young lady cutting onions tells the story of the birth of a girl named Tita. Tita's mother, Elena, gives birth on the kitchen table, assisted by the cook, Nacha. Shortly afterwards, Elena's husband dies of a heart attack when a stranger tells him that his wife had an affair, and that his daughter, Gertrudis, is not his. During the funeral, Elena explains that family tradition dictates that Tita, the youngest, cannot marry, but must take care of her until her death. Nacha takes charge of teaching Tita how to cook and she learns to infuse her emotions into food.

Years later, a young man named Pedro Muzquiz professes his love to Tita, who feels the same about Pedro. Pedro arrives to ask for her hand but Elena explains Tita is not allowed to marry and offers Rosaura instead. Rosaura is delighted, Tita is devastated, and Gertrudis and Chencha, a maid, are disappointed. Nacha overhears Pedro tell his father that he is marrying Rosaura only to stay close to Tita. Nacha tells Tita, but she is too upset to believe it. While baking the wedding cake, Tita cries into the batter. During the wedding reception, Pedro tells Tita of his true feelings but Elena tells Tita she must stay away from Pedro. As the guests eat the wedding cake, everyone is overcome with great sadness for lost lovers and begins to cry. Overcome with this sadness, Elena rushes to her bedroom and tearfully looks at a photo of a well-dressed mulatto man. Tita finds Nacha dead holding a picture of her husband.

Some time later, Rosaura becomes pregnant. One day, Pedro brings Tita a bouquet of roses to celebrate Tita being the head cook. Elena commands Tita to throw them away, but Tita uses the petals to create a rose sauce for a quail dish. While eating the meal, everyone becomes filled with sensual gratification except Rosaura who gets sick and leaves the table. Gertrudis becomes so overheated that the shower house catches fire. She runs away naked, encountering a soldier, Juan Alejandrez. Gertrudis jumps onto his horse and leaves with him. Tita sees this, but tells Elena that she was kidnapped. Tita secretly sends Gertrudis her things.

Rosaura gives birth to a sickly son, Roberto but she is too ill to nurse Roberto so she must let Tita nurse him. Still suspicious that Tita and Pedro are having an affair, Elena sends Rosaura, Pedro, and Roberto to live in Texas where months later Roberto dies. Tita is greatly saddened by the news, but Elena tells her to show no emotion and to continue with the kitchen chores. This leads to a confrontation and Tita runs into the dovecote and Elena threatens to have the ladder taken down. She is rescued by John Brown, a doctor, who takes her to his home in Texas for care for her. Chencha goes to visit Tita but she tells Chencha to tell Elena that she is never coming back to the ranch. Doctor Brown has fallen in love with Tita and proposes and Tita accepts.

Back at the ranch, bandits invade the property and push Elena off a cliff. Tita and Doctor Brown return to the ranch to prepare Elena's funeral. While dressing Elena's body, Tita discovers the picture of Elena's lover. Pedro and Rosaura return for Elena's funeral, when Rosaura's water breaks. Rosaura gives birth to a healthy baby girl named Esperanza. Esperanza refuses to be fed by Rosaura, so Tita once again nurses the baby. Due to complications in childbirth, Rosaura has become infertile and she imposes the family tradition on Esperanza, to Tita and Pedro's dismay. Pedro becomes jealous when he finds out about Tita's engagement to Doctor Brown, and he sneaks into Tita's room to have sex with her.

During a party, Gertrudis, now a military general, returns with Juan Alejandrez, now her husband, and their squad. Feeling guilty, Tita begins to have illusions of Elena chastising her, and she suspects that she is pregnant with Pedro's child so she tells Gertrudis her concerns. Gertrudis advises Tita to tell Pedro because the love Pedro and she share is true, and that Rosaura's feelings are irrelevant because she knew that Tita was in love with Pedro. Tita is once again confronted with the illusion of Elena berating her. This time, Tita stands up to Elena, confronting her about her affair and then banishing her. While singing below Tita's window with Juan, Pedro catches on fire. Tita treats Pedro's wounds until Doctor Brown shows up. Pedro, still jealous of Tita's engagement to Doctor Brown, wants her to break it off, and threatens to tell Doctor Brown about their one-night stand and her pregnancy. Tita tells Pedro she is not pregnant; it was a false alarm. From guilt, though, Tita tells Doctor Brown of her infidelity and apologizes. Doctor Brown accepts her apology and states that he still wants to be with her, but will accept whatever decision she makes. Rosaura confronts Tita about her relationship with Pedro and threatens to kick Tita off the ranch if she goes anywhere near Esperanza.

Many years later, Esperanza marries Doctor Brown's son. Through gossip, Tita is revealed to have stayed on the ranch to fight for Esperanza's right to marry, and Pedro woke up to find Rosaura dead from illness, releasing Esperanza from the family tradition. Pedro tells Tita that with Esperanza married off, they can rekindle their romance. After the wedding, they go to the guest house to make love. While having sex, Pedro has a heart attack and dies. Devastated, Tita commits suicide by swallowing matches, causing her body to spontaneously combust and the room to catch fire.

The young woman narrating the whole story reveals that she is Esperanza's daughter, and when Esperanza returned home from her honeymoon to find the property burned to ashes, she discovered Tita's cookbook, which she kept and passed down to her daughter.

== Cast ==
- Lumi Cavazos as Tita
- Marco Leonardi as Pedro
- Regina Torné as Mama Elena
- Mario Iván Martínez as Doctor John Brown
- Ada Carrasco as Nacha
- Yareli Arizmendi as Rosaura
- Claudette Maillé as Gertrudis
- Pilar Aranda as Chencha
- Farnesio de Bernal as Cura
- Joaquín Garrido as Sargento Treviño
- Rodolfo Arias as Juan Alejándrez
- Margarita Isabel as Paquita Lobo
- Sandra Arau as Esperanza Muzquiz
- Andrés García Jr as Alex Brown
- Regino Herrera as Nicolás
- Genaro Aguirre as Rosalio
- David Ostrosky as Juan de la Garza
- Brígida Alexander as Tia Mary
- Amado Ramírez as Pedro's father
- Arcelia Ramírez as Esperanza's daughter
- Socorro Rodríguez as friend of Paquita

== Themes ==
=== Gender ===
Differing gender roles and values are central to the de la Garza family. The film complicates the roles that tradition expects Tita, Getrudis, and Rosaura to play. Tita, a maternal caretaker, breaks tradition; Gertrudis embodies the duality of the male and the female; and Rosaura, an upholder of the traditional female role, fails to fulfill it. Rosaura strives to be a traditional female matron. She marries her sister Tita's one true love Pedro and adopts the role of wife. Her primary duties are to cook, to clean, and to take care of her children. The problem is that she cannot cook, cannot clean, and cannot nurse her own baby. Next to bend her gender is Gertrudis, offspring of an illicit affair between Mama Elena and her paramour. We know from early on that Gertrudis does not fit the ladylike mold. She is a tomboy, openly disagreeing with her mother and her traditional values. She encourages Tita to court Pedro even though he is married to their sister. When Tita's emotions enter into the rose petal dish she serves the family for dinner, Gertrudis eats and becomes so aroused that her body begins to steam. She runs to the outhouse, her heat setting it on fire, and departs home on the back of a horse ridden by a soldier of the Mexican Revolution. When Gertrudis mysteriously returns one night, we learn that she is a soldier fighting in the Revolution. Married to the man on the horse, she now commands her husband's troops. Tita is her sisters' opposite. She is a caretaker and family cook. Everyone loves her cooking and Tita miraculously serves as nursemaid to Rosaura's baby, since Rosaura is unable to produce milk. (When Pedro and Rosaura move away, the baby dies because Rosaura could not nurse it.) The differing gender roles give each character depth and significance, highlighting the opposites at work in each sister. In doing so the film displays strong women breaking barriers and redefining what it means to be a female.

=== Tradition ===
Tradition is central to this movie. Tita, Gertrudis and the Mexican Revolution itself all fight against it. The movie's main conflict is a family tradition which forbids the youngest daughter from marrying so that she will be free to take care of her mother. This requirement sets up a battle between Tita and her mother, Mama Elena. Tita struggles to live her own life; Mama Elena fights to keep Tita at home. So fierce is Mama Elena's desire to uphold tradition that she orders her oldest daughter, Rosaura, to marry Pedro, Tita's one true love. Gertrudis, the middle child and offspring of an illicit affair between Mama Elena and her lover, runs away from home and joins the people fighting to end the dictatorship and corruption afflicting the common folk of Mexico. Tired of the tradition that only the wealthy landowners had wealth and power, the people revolted, fighting for the workers of the land. Gertrudis' battle against the government parallels the battle between Tita and Elena. Both fight for change. In the war Gertrudis becomes a leader of an all-male rebel group. The men both listen and respect her. Gertrudis challenges tradition and becomes a successful leader. Tita's challenge to tradition will also be successful and portends successful change for Mexico.

On the other hand, while tradition serves well to help pass down a family's customs or even cultural customs, often tradition can be viewed negatively and tear families and society apart because of how it can mistreat those in society who deviate from tradition. Mexican culture has in fact long expressed this coerced marriage rule in which women's opinions are left unconsidered, and as a result these traditions lead to the mistreatment of women. This mistreatment also happens in the de la Garza family where the family tradition prevents the main character, Tita, from marrying Pedro due to the rule that the youngest daughter must not marry. Thus, breaking this specific tradition is a main theme within the film. One way this is represented in the film is through the character of Mama Elena as her oppressive and tyrannical force to Tita. Her character displays how corruptive traditions such as forced marriage hinder others and tear groups apart, as Mama Elena does to Tita to prevent her from marrying Pedro. However, with the help of Tita's magical cooking that eventually breaks the family free from tradition, Tita and her sister, Gertrudis, not only break barriers and the gender roles in their society, but also help establish a tradition to start treating each other equally.

== Filming locations ==
- Ciudad Acuña, Coahuila
- Eagle Pass, Texas
- Piedras Negras, Coahuila
- Del Rio, Texas

== Reception ==
=== Critical response ===
Like Water for Chocolate received acclaim from critics. On review aggregator website Rotten Tomatoes, the film holds an approval rating of 88%, based on 48 reviews, and an average rating of 7.6/10. The website's critics consensus reads, "Like Water for Chocolate plays to the senses with a richly rewarding romance that indulges in magical realism to intoxicating effect." On Metacritic, it has a weighted average score of 86 out of 100 based on 18 critics, indicating "universal acclaim".

The American release of this film is shorter than the original Mexican version. In the original release, you see Tita returns home to take care of her dying mother; in the American release, this complete sequence is removed and instead Tita only returns home for her mother's funeral.

=== Box office ===
The film became the highest-grossing foreign-language film ever released in the United States and Canada at the time with a gross of $21.6 million, surpassing the previous record of $20.2 million set by I Am Curious (Yellow) released in 1969.

=== Year-end lists ===
- 6th – Dan Craft, The Pantagraph

=== Awards and nominations ===
==== Ariel Awards ====
The Ariel Awards are awarded annually by the Mexican Academy of Film Arts and Sciences in Mexico. Como agua para chocolate received ten awards out of 14 nominations.

Year	Nominee / work	Award	Result
1992	Como Agua Para Chocolate	Best Picture	Won
1992	Alfonso Arau	Best Director	Won
1992	Mario Iván Martínez	Best Actor	Won
1992	Regina Torné	Best Actress	Won
1992	Lumi Cavazos	Best Actress	Nominated
1992	Claudette Maillé	Best Supporting Actress	Won
1992	Pilar Aranda	Best Supporting Actress	Nominated
1992	Joaquín Garrido	Best Actor in a Minor Role	Nominated
1992	Margarita Isabel	Best Actress in a Minor Role	Won
1992	Laura Esquivel	Best Screenplay	Won
1992	Emmanuel Lubezki	Best Cinematography	Won
1992	Carlos Bolado and Francisco Chiú	Best Editing	Nominated
1992	Emilio Mendoza, Gonzalo Ceja and Ricardo Mendoza	Best Production Design	Won
1992	Marco Antonio Arteaga, Carlos Brown, Mauricio De Aguinaco and Denise Pizzini	Best Set Design	Won

==== Golden Globe Awards ====
Year	Nominee / work	Award	Result
1992	Como Agua Para Chocolate	Best Foreign Language Film	Nominated

== See also ==
- List of submissions to the 65th Academy Awards for Best Foreign Language Film
- List of Mexican submissions for the Academy Award for Best Foreign Language Film
