= Alfonso Cuarón filmography =

Films directed by the mexican filmmaker Alfonso Cuarón

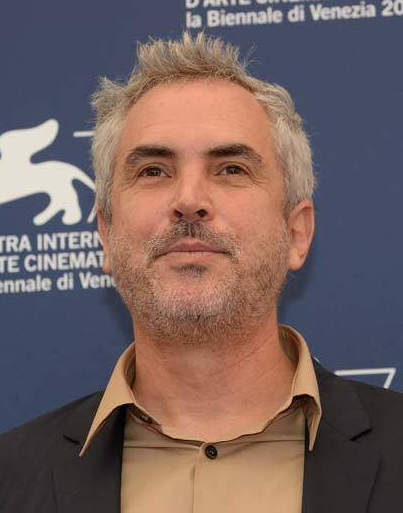
Alfonso Cuarón at the 2016 Venice International Film Festival

Alfonso Cuarón is a Mexican filmmaker. His most notable films include the children's fantasy drama A Little Princess (1995), the romantic drama Great Expectations (1998), the coming of age drama Y tu mamá también (2001), the fantasy film Harry Potter and the Prisoner of Azkaban (2004), the dystopian drama Children of Men (2006), the science fiction film Gravity (2013), and Mexican drama film Roma (2018).

== Feature films ==
Year	Title	Credited as				Notes
Year	Title	Director	Writer	Producer	Editor	Notes
1991	Sólo con tu pareja	Yes	Yes	Yes	Yes	
1995	A Little Princess	Yes	No	No	No	
1998	Great Expectations	Yes	No	No	No	
2001	Y tu mamá también	Yes	Yes	Yes	Yes	
2004	Harry Potter and the Prisoner of Azkaban	Yes	No	No	No	
2006	Children of Men	Yes	Yes	No	Yes	
2013	Gravity	Yes	Yes	Yes	Yes	
2018	Roma	Yes	Yes	Yes	Yes	Also cinematographer

Producer only

- Crónicas (2004)
- The Assassination of Richard Nixon (2004)
- Pan's Labyrinth (2006)
- Rudo y Cursi (2008)
- Desierto (2015)
- The Witches (2020)
- Raymond & Ray (2022)

Executive producer

- Black Sun (2005) (Documentary)
- Year of the Nail (2007)
- This Changes Everything (2015) (Documentary)
- The Disciple (2020)
- The Voice of Hind Rajab (2025)

First assistant director

- Gaby: A True Story (1987)

== Short films ==
Year	Title	Credited as			Notes
Year	Title	Director	Writer	Editor	Notes
1983	Who's He Anyway	Yes	Yes	Yes	Co-written with Mariana Elizondo
1983	Vengeance Is Mine	Yes	Yes	Yes	Co-written and co-directed with Carlos Marcovich
1983	Cuarteto para el fin del tiempo	Yes	Yes	Yes	Included on Cinema 16: World Short Films (2008)
1997	Sístole diástole	No	Yes	No	
2006	Parc Monceau	Yes	Yes	No	Segment of Paris, je t'aime
2014	Muddy Girl	No	Yes	No	

Documentary shorts

Year	Title	Credited as			Notes
Year	Title	Director	Writer	Producer	Notes
2007	The Possibility of Hope	Yes	Yes	Yes	Included on the DVD of Children of Men
2007	The Shock Doctrine	No	Yes	Yes	
2009	I Am Autism	Yes	Yes	No	

Executive producer

Year	Title	Notes
2002	Me la debes	
2010	The Second Bakery Attack	
2013	Aningaaq	Spin-off of Gravity, included as a bonus on the DVD

Producer

- Le pupille (2022)
- The Shepherd (2023)
- An Almost Christmas Story (2024)

== Television ==
Year	Title	Credited as				Notes
Year	Title	Director	Writer	Executive Producer	Editor	Notes
1988–1989	La hora marcada	Yes	Yes	No	Yes	Writer and director (6 episodes), Editor (1 episode), Also cinematographer (5 episodes)
1993	Fallen Angels	Yes	No	No	No	Episode: "Murder, Obliquely"
2014	Believe	Yes	Yes	Yes	No	Co-creator; Co-writer and director, Episode: "Pilot"
2024	Disclaimer	Yes	Yes	Yes	No	Miniseries
