= 34th Ariel Awards =

1992 Mexican film awards

- Date: April 27, 1993

Highlights
- Best Picture: Como Agua Para Chocolate
- Most awards: Como Agua Para Chocolate (10)
- Most nominations: Como Agua Para Chocolate (14)

The 34th Ariel Awards ceremony, organized by the Mexican Academy of Film Arts and Sciences (AMACC) took place on April 27, 1992, in Mexico City. During the ceremony, AMACC presented the Ariel Award in 20 categories honoring films released in 1991. Como Agua Para Chocolate received ten awards out of 14 nominations, including Best Picture and Best Director for Alfonso Arau. La Mujer de Benjamín followed with six awards; and El Bulto, Objetos Perdidos, Perdón...Investidura (1950-1954), Playa Azul, Sólo Con Tu Pareja and Travesía de la Obsesión (Expedición al Himalaya) with one.

== Winners and nominees ==
Winners are listed first and highlighted with boldface.

**Best Picture**: **Como Agua Para Chocolate**; Danzón	**Best Director**: **Alfonso Arau** – **Como Agua Para Chocolate**; Carlos Carrera – La Mujer de Benjamín; Maria Novaro – Danzón
**Best Actor**: **Mario Iván Martínez** – **Como Agua Para Chocolate**; José Alonso – La Tarea; Eduardo López Rojas – La Mujer de Benjamín	**Best Actress**: **Regina Torné** – **Como Agua Para Chocolate**; Lumi Cavazos – Como Agua Para Chocolate; Helena Rojo – Muerte Ciega
**Best Supporting Actor**: **Eduardo Palomo** – **La Mujer de Benjamín**; Bruno Bichir – El Patrullero; Juan Claudio Retes – El Bulto	**Best Supporting Actress**: **Claudette Maillé** – **Como Agua Para Chocolate**; Pilar Aranda – Como Agua Para Chocolate; Malena Doria – La Mujer de Benjamín
**Best Actor in a Minor Role**: **Farnesio de Bernal, Luis Ignacio Erazo, Enrique Gardiel and Rubén Márquez** – **La Mujer de Benjamín**; Farnesio de Bernal – El Patrullero; Joaquín Garrido – Como Agua Para Chocolate	**Best Actress in a Minor Role**: **Margarita Isabel** – **Como Agua Para Chocolate**; Delia Casanova – El Bulto; Ana Bertha Espín – La Mujer de Benjamín
**Best Original Story**: **Sólo Con Tu Pareja** – **Alfonso Cuarón and Carlos Cuarón**; Danzón – Maria Novaro and Beatriz Novaro; La Mujer de Benjamín – Carlos Carrera and Ignacio Ortíz Cruz	**Best Screenplay**: **Como Agua Para Chocolate** – **Laura Esquivel**; La Mujer de Benjamín – Carlos Carrera and Ignacio Ortíz Cruz; Sólo Con Tu Pareja – Alfonso Cuarón and Carlos Cuarón
**Best First Feature Film**: **La Mujer de Benjamín** – **Carlos Carrera**; Anoche Soñé Contigo – Maryse Sistach; Sólo Con Tu Pareja – Alfonso Cuarón	**Best Best Medium-Length Fiction Film**: **Travesía de la Obsesión (Expedición al Himalaya)** – **Eduardo Gleason and Miguel Gleason**; Después del Sismo – Eduardo Salazar
**Best Live Action Short Film**: **Objetos Perdidos** – **Eva López-Sánchez**; El Último Fin de Año – Javier Bourges; ¿Puede Hablar un Poco Más Alto Por Favor? – Arturo Carrasco	**Best Documentary Short Subject**: **Perdón...Investidura (1950-1954)** – **José Rovirosa**; Olmeca – Fernando Altamirano; Se Está Volviendo Gobierno (1915-1919) – Miguel Barbachano
**Best Original Score**: **Playa Azul – Amparo Rubín**; El Bulto – Pedro Plascencia Salinas; La Mujer de Benjamín – Alejandro Giacomán and José Amozurrutia	**Best Original Music Theme or Song**: **Ciudad de Ciegos – José Elorza**
**Best Cinematography**: **Como Agua Para Chocolate** – **Emmanuel Lubezki**; La Mujer de Benjamín – Xavier Pérez Grobet; Sólo Con Tu Pareja – Emmanuel Lubezki	**Best Film Editing**: **El Bulto – Saúl Aupart**; Como Agua Para Chocolate – Carlos Bolado and Francisco Chiú; La Mujer de Benjamín – Óscar Figueroa and Sigfrido Barjau
**Best Production Design**: **Como Agua Para Chocolate** – **Emilio Mendoza, Gonzalo Ceja and Ricardo Mendoza**; La Mujer de Benjamín – Gloria Carrasco	**Best Set Design**: **Como Agua Para Chocolate** – **Marco Antonio Arteaga, Carlos Brown, Mauricio De Aguinaco and Denise Pizzini**; Ciudad de Ciegos – Homero Espinoza; La Mujer de Benjamín – Gloria Carrasco

== Special awards ==
- Golden Ariel – Ricardo Saldivar

== Multiple nominations and awards ==
The following seven films received multiple nominations:

Nominations	Film
14	Como Agua Para Chocolate
13	La Mujer de Benjamín
4	El Bulto
4	Sólo Con Tu Pareja
3	Danzón
2	Ciudad de Ciegos
2	El Patrullero

Films that received multiple awards:

Awards	Film
10	Como Agua Para Chocolate
6	La Mujer de Benjamín
