= List of awards and nominations received by Alfonso Cuarón =

Alfonso Cuarón awards and nominations
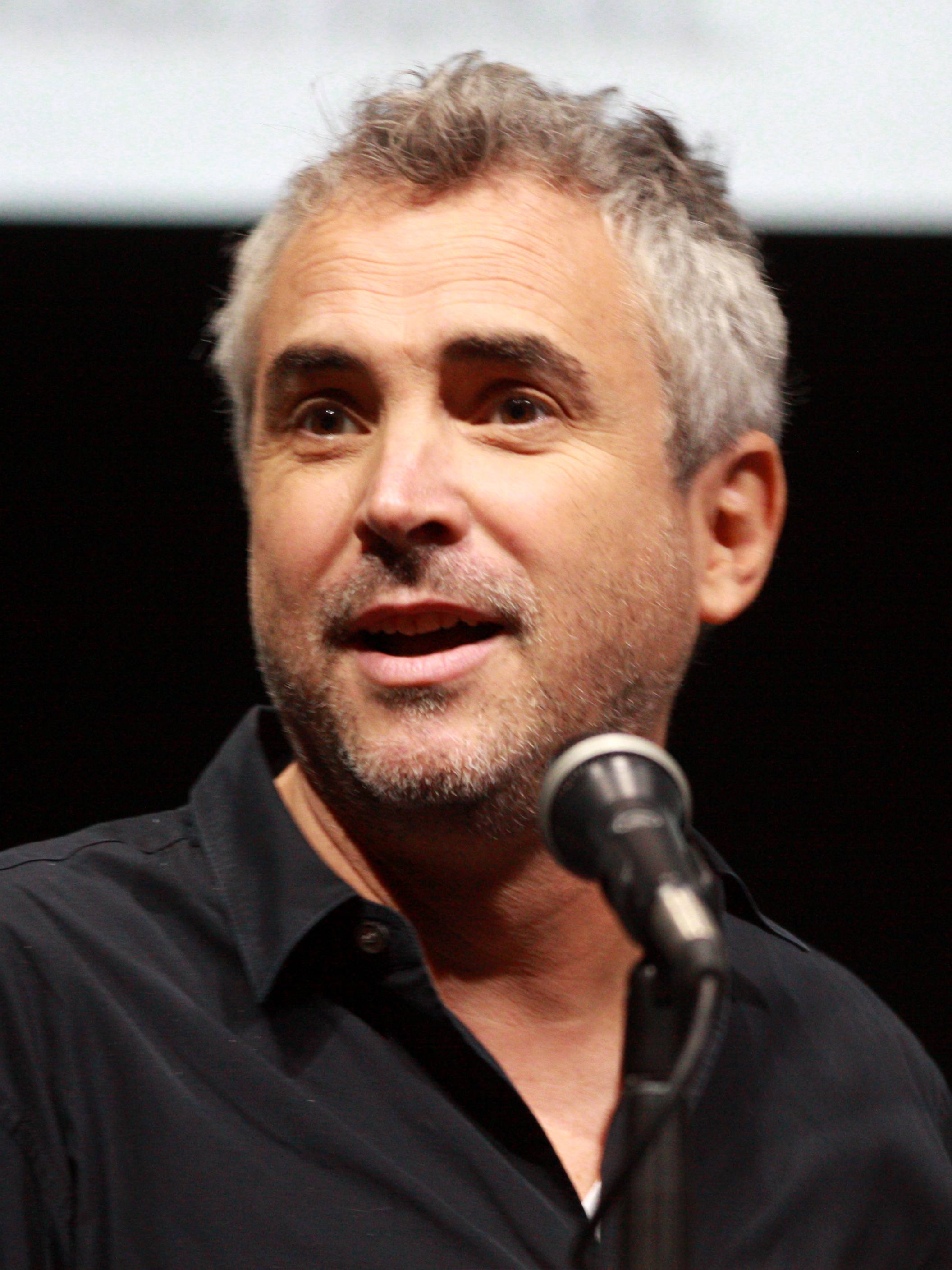
- Cuarón in 2013
Awards and nominations
Award	Wins	Nominations
Academy Awards	4	11
BAFTAs	8	16
Critics' Choice Awards	8	12
Emmy Awards	0	1
Golden Globe Awards	4	6
Grammy Awards	0	1

Totals (Note: Certain award groups do not simply award one winner. They acknowledge several different recipients, have runners-up, and have third place. Since this is a specific recognition and is different from losing an award, runner-up mentions are considered wins in this award tally. For simplification and to avoid errors, each award in this list has been presumed to have had a prior nomination.)
- Wins: 76
- Nominations: 129

This article is a list of awards and nominations received by Alfonso Cuarón.

Alfonso Cuarón is a Mexican filmmaker. He has received various accolades including four Academy Awards, eight BAFTA Awards, eight Critics' Choice Awards and three Golden Globe Awards, as well as a nominations for an Emmy Award and a Grammy Award.

He received his first Oscar nomination at the 75th Academy Awards for Best Original Screenplay for his coming-of-age film Y Tu Mamá También (2002). At the 79th Academy Awards, his dystopian drama film Children of Men (2006) was nominated for Best Adapted Screenplay and Best Film Editing. At the 86th Academy Awards, his science-fiction drama film Gravity (2013) earned him two Academy Awards for Best Director and Best Film Editing, and a nomination for Best Picture. At the 91st Academy Awards, his semi-autobiographical drama film Roma (2018) earned him two Academy Awards for Best Director and Best Cinematography, along with nominations for Best Picture and Best Original Screenplay. At the 95th Academy Awards he was nominated for the short-film Le pupille (2022) in the Best Live Action Short Film category.

== Major associations ==
=== Academy Awards ===
Year	Category	Nominated work	Result	Ref.
2002	Best Original Screenplay	Y Tu Mamá También	Nominated	
2006	Best Adapted Screenplay	Children of Men	Nominated	
2006	Best Film Editing	Children of Men	Nominated	
2013	Best Picture	Gravity	Nominated	
2013	Best Director	Gravity	Won	
2013	Best Film Editing	Gravity	Won	
2018	Best Picture	Roma	Nominated	
2018	Best Director	Roma	Won	
2018	Best Original Screenplay	Roma	Nominated	
2018	Best Cinematography	Roma	Won	
2022	Best Live Action Short	Le pupille	Nominated	

=== BAFTA Awards ===
Year	Category	Nominated work	Result	Ref.
British Academy Film Awards
2002	Best Original Screenplay	Y Tu Mamá También	Nominated	
2004	Best British Film	Harry Potter and the Prisoner of Azkaban	Nominated	
2013	Best Film	Gravity	Nominated	
2013	Best Director	Gravity	Won	
2013	Best British Film	Gravity	Won	
2013	Best Original Screenplay	Gravity	Nominated	
2013	Best Editing	Gravity	Nominated	
2018	Best Film	Roma	Won	
2018	Best Director	Roma	Won	
2018	Best Original Screenplay	Roma	Nominated	
2018	Best Film Not in the English Language	Roma	Accepted	
2018	Best Cinematography	Roma	Won	
2018	Best Editing	Roma	Nominated	
British Academy of Film and Television Arts Children's Awards
2004	Best Feature Film	Harry Potter and the Prisoner of Azkaban	Won	

=== Critics' Choice Awards ===
Year	Category	Nominated work	Result	Ref.
2002	Best Foreign Language Film	Y Tu Mamá También	Won	
2004	Best Family Film	Harry Potter and the Prisoner of Azkaban	Nominated	
2013	Best Picture	Gravity	Nominated	
2013	Best Director	Gravity	Won	
2013	Best Editing	Gravity	Won	
2013	Best Science Fiction/Horror Film	Gravity	Won	
2018	Best Picture	Roma	Won	
2018	Best Director	Roma	Won	
2018	Best Original Screenplay	Roma	Nominated	
2018	Best Cinematography	Roma	Won	
2018	Best Editing	Roma	Nominated	
2018	Best Foreign Language Film	Roma	Won	

=== Emmy Awards ===
Year	Category	Nominated work	Result	Ref.
Children's and Family Emmy Awards
2026	Outstanding Animated Special	An Almost Christmas Story	Nominated	

=== Golden Globe Awards ===
Year	Category	Nominated work	Result	Ref.
2002	Best Motion Picture – Foreign Language	Y Tu Mamá También	Nominated	
2013	Best Motion Picture – Drama	Gravity	Nominated	
2013	Best Director – Motion Picture	Gravity	Won	
2018	Best Motion Picture – Foreign Language	Roma	Won	
2018	Best Director – Motion Picture	Roma	Won	
2018	Best Screenplay – Motion Picture	Roma	Nominated	

=== Grammy Awards ===
Year	Category	Nominated work	Result	Ref.
2003	Best Compilation Soundtrack for Visual Media	Y Tu Mamá También	Nominated	

== Guild associations ==
Award	Year	Category	Nominated work	Result	Ref.
ACE Eddie Awards	2013	Best Edited Feature Film – Dramatic	Gravity	Nominated	
ACE Eddie Awards	2018	Best Edited Feature Film – Dramatic	Roma	Nominated	
ASC Awards	2018	Outstanding Achievement in Cinematography in Theatrical Releases	Roma	Nominated	
Directors Guild of America Awards	2013	Outstanding Directing – Feature Film	Gravity	Won	
Directors Guild of America Awards	2018	Outstanding Directing – Feature Film	Roma	Won	
Directors Guild of America Awards	2024	Outstanding Directing – Miniseries or TV Film	Disclaimer	Nominated	
Producers Guild of America Awards	2013	Best Theatrical Motion Picture	Gravity	Won	
Producers Guild of America Awards	2018	Best Theatrical Motion Picture	Roma	Nominated	
Writers Guild of America Awards	2019	Best Original Screenplay	Roma	Nominated	

== Miscellaneous associations ==
Award	Year	Category	Nominated work	Result	Ref.
AACTA Awards	2013	Best International Film	Gravity	Won	
AACTA Awards	2013	Best International Director	Gravity	Won	
AACTA Awards	2018	Best International Film	Roma	Won	
AACTA Awards	2018	Best International Director	Roma	Won	
AACTA Awards	2018	Best International Screenplay	Roma	Nominated	
Argentine Film Critics Association	2014	Best Foreign Film	Gravity	Nominated	
British Independent Film Awards	2018	Best Foreign Independent Film	Roma	Won	
Dallas–Fort Worth Film Critics Association	2013	Best Film	Gravity	Nominated	
Dallas–Fort Worth Film Critics Association	2013	Best Director	Gravity	Won	
Dallas–Fort Worth Film Critics Association	2018	Best Film	Roma	Nominated	
Dallas–Fort Worth Film Critics Association	2018	Best Director	Roma	Won	
Dallas–Fort Worth Film Critics Association	2018	Best Cinematography	Roma	Won	
Dallas–Fort Worth Film Critics Association	2018	Best Foreign Language Film	Roma	Won	
Capri Hollywood International Film Festival	2018	Best Director	Roma	Won	
Empire Awards	2014	Best Director	Gravity	Won	
Florida Film Critics Circle	2013	Best Director	Gravity	Nominated	
Florida Film Critics Circle	2018	Best Film	Roma	Nominated	
Florida Film Critics Circle	2018	Best Director	Roma	Won	
Florida Film Critics Circle	2018	Best Cinematography	Roma	Nominated	
Florida Film Critics Circle	2018	Best Foreign Language Film	Roma	Nominated	
Houston Film Critics Society	2013	Best Film	Gravity	Nominated	
Houston Film Critics Society	2013	Best Director	Gravity	Won	
Houston Film Critics Society	2018	Roma	Best Film	Nominated	
Houston Film Critics Society	2018	Roma	Best Director	Won	
Houston Film Critics Society	2018	Roma	Best Cinematography	Won	
Houston Film Critics Society	2018	Roma	Best Foreign Language Film	Won	
Independent Spirit Awards	2003	Best Foreign Film	Y Tu Mamá También	Won	
Independent Spirit Awards	2007	Best Feature	Pan's Labyrinth	Nominated	
Independent Spirit Awards	2019	Best International Film	Roma	Won	
Los Angeles Film Critics Association	2013	Best Film	Gravity	Won	
Los Angeles Film Critics Association	2013	Best Director	Gravity	Won	
Los Angeles Film Critics Association	2013	Best Editing	Gravity	Won	
Los Angeles Film Critics Association	2018	Best Film	Roma	Won	
Los Angeles Film Critics Association	2018	Best Director	Roma	Nominated	
Los Angeles Film Critics Association	2018	Best Cinematography	Roma	Won	
Los Angeles Film Critics Association	2018	Best Editing	Roma	Nominated	
Locarno Film Festival	2024	Lifetime Achievement Award		Won	
Morelia International Film Festival	2018	Artistic Excellence Award	Lifetime Achievement	Won	
National Board of Review	2018	Top Ten Films	Roma	Won	
New York Film Critics Circle	2018	Best Film	Roma	Won	
New York Film Critics Circle	2018	Best Director	Roma	Won	
New York Film Critics Circle	2018	Best Cinematography	Roma	Won	
San Diego Film Critics Society	2013	Best Film	Gravity	Nominated	
San Diego Film Critics Society	2013	Best Director	Gravity	Won	
San Diego Film Critics Society	2013	Best Editing	Gravity	Nominated	
San Diego Film Critics Society	2018	Best Cinematography	Roma	Nominated	
San Diego Film Critics Society	2018	Best Foreign Language Film	Roma	Nominated	
Palm Springs International Film Festival	2019	Sonny Bono Visionary Award	Roma	Won	
San Francisco Bay Area Film Critics Circle	2013	Best Director	Gravity	Won	
San Francisco Bay Area Film Critics Circle	2013	Best Editing	Gravity	Won	
Satellite Awards	2014	Best Director	Gravity	Nominated	
Satellite Awards	2014	Best Editing	Gravity	Nominated	
Satellite Awards	2019	Best Director	Roma	Won	
Satellite Awards	2019	Best Original Screenplay	Roma	Won	
Satellite Awards	2019	Best Cinematography	Roma	Nominated	
Satellite Awards	2019	Best Editing	Roma	Won	
Saturn Awards	2005	Best Fantasy Film	Harry Potter and the Prisoner of Azkaban	Nominated	
Saturn Awards	2005	Best Director	Harry Potter and the Prisoner of Azkaban	Nominated	
Saturn Awards	2007	Best Science Fiction Film	Children of Men	Won	
Saturn Awards	2007	Best Director	Children of Men	Nominated	
Saturn Awards	2007	Best International Film	Pan's Labyrinth	Won	
Saturn Awards	2014	Best Science Fiction Film	Gravity	Won	
Saturn Awards	2014	Best Director	Gravity	Won	
Saturn Awards	2014	Best Editing	Gravity	Won	
Saturn Awards	2014	Best Writing	Gravity	Nominated	
Seattle Film Critics Society	2018	Best Picture	Roma	Won	
Seattle Film Critics Society	2018	Best Director	Roma	Won	
Seattle Film Critics Society	2018	Best Screenplay	Roma	Nominated	
Seattle Film Critics Society	2018	Best Cinematography	Roma	Won	
Seattle Film Critics Society	2018	Best Editing	Roma	Nominated	
Seattle Film Critics Society	2018	Best Foreign Language Film	Roma	Won	
Venice Film Festival	2001	Golden Lion	Y tu mamá también	Nominated	
Venice Film Festival	2001	Best Screenplay	Y tu mamá también	Won	
Venice Film Festival	2006	Golden Lion	Children of Men	Nominated	
Venice Film Festival	2006	Laterna Magica Prize	Children of Men	Won	
Venice Film Festival	2013	Future Film Digital Award	Gravity	Won	
Venice Film Festival	2018	Golden Lion	Roma	Won	

== Directed Academy Award performances ==
Cuaron has directed multiple nominated performances.

Year	Performer	Film	Result
Academy Award for Best Actress
2013	Sandra Bullock	Gravity	Nominated
2018	Yalitza Aparicio	Roma	Nominated
Academy Award for Best Supporting Actress
2018	Marina de Tavira	Roma	Nominated
