= Alondra Hidalgo =

Mexican actress

- Born: Alondra Patricia Hidalgo Quintero; February 17, 1989 (age 37); Mexico City, Mexico
- Occupation: Actress
- Years active: 1990-present
- Parents: Enrique Hidalgo (father); Patricia Quintero (mother)

Alondra Patricia Hidalgo Quintero (born February 17, 1989) is a Mexican actress with 231 voiceovers in Spanish.

== Life and education ==
Alondra Hidalgo was the youngest child of Mexican actors Patricia Quintero and Enrique Hidalgo. Her parents met each other at work and she declares "she was raised on dubbing studios". Alondra is the younger half-sibling of Mexican actress Alma Cero and voice actor Alejandro Hidalgo. She later became the aunt of Bruno Vega (born in 1997). Her parents got divorced in her youth and she lived with her mother and her sister.

She studied Chemistry of gastronomy at National Autonomous University of Mexico(UNAM) but left the course.

Alondra was raised as non-catholic by her mother. She is agnostic and feminist.

== Career ==
She began doing voice dubbing at a very young age, as she was born in a family of voice actors. She recorded screams and whims as a toddler as it was illegal to get the original SFX of American movies to dubbing studios. She is known for having played Hinata Hyuga in the anime series Naruto, Ginny Weasley on Harry Potter film series, Miu Furinji in the anime series Kenichi: The Mightiest Disciple, Molly Cunningham in TaleSpin, Sam Puckett on iCarly and Sam & Cat, and the young lioness Kiara in The Lion King II: Simba's Pride. In 2014 she played the role of Adela in the Mexican thriller film Desierto, directed by Jonas Cuaron. She plays Gwen Stacy on Spider-Man: Into the Spider-Verse (2018) and Spider-Man: Across the Spider-Verse (2023).

Alondra also works on stage acting, appearing on the stage play Vírgenes en Pugna playing the virgin of Colombia. She also works a dubbing director on series and videogames.

== Filmography ==
=== Anime ===
- Kenichi: The Mightiest Disciple (2010) - Miu Furinji
- JoJo's Bizarre Adventure: Stone Ocean (2021-2022) - Jolyne Cujoh
- Elfen Lied (2016) - Lucy/Nyu/Kaede
- Re:Zero − Starting Life in Another World (2016–present) - Rem
- Saga of Tanya the Evil (2018) - Mary Sue
- Miss Kobayashi's Dragon Maid (2018-2021) - Shouta Magatsuchi
- KonoSuba: God's Blessing on This Wonderful World! (2018-2024) - Yunyun
- Violet Evergarden (2018) - Erica Brown
- Darling in the Franxx (2019) - Ikuno
- That Time I Got Reincarnated as a Slime (2021–present) - Shuna
- Black Clover (2022) - Undine
- Chainsaw Man (2022) - Akane Sawatari
- Date A Live (2022-2024) - Mildred F. Fujimura
- Haikyu!! (2022) - Hitoka Yachi
- KonoSuba: An Explosion on This Wonderful World! (2023) - Yunyun

=== TV and films ===
- Crónica de castas (2014) - Lola
- Desierto (2015) - Adela
- Death Note (2017) - Mia
- Victorious (2011) - Jade West
- iCarly (2007) - Sam Puckett
- Zoey 101 (2005) - Lola Martínez

=== Videogames ===
- The Legend of Zelda: Breath of the Wild (2017) - Mipha
- Hyrule Warriors: Age of Calamity (2020) - Tulin
- The Legend of Zelda: Tears of the Kingdom (2023) - Tulin and Sage of Water
- Harry Potter for Kinect (2012) - Ginny Weasley
