= Astrid Hadad =

Mexican actress and performance artist

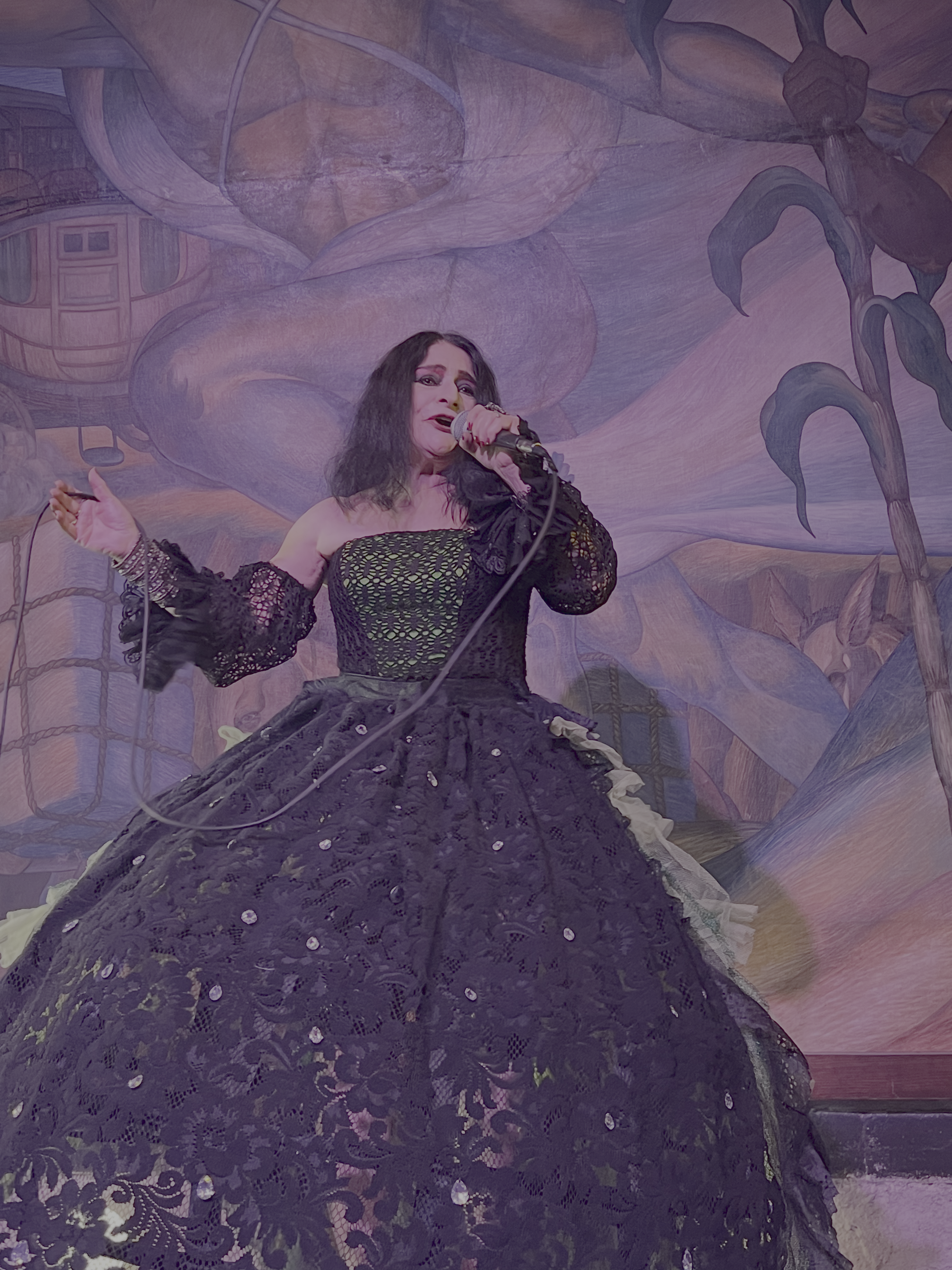
- Astrid Hadad performing her rendition of "La Llorona" (November 30, 2024)
- Born: Chetumal, Quintana Roo, Mexico
- Occupation: Performance Artist
- Known for: Political Cabaret
- Notable work: Heavy Nopal, Pecadora, Vivir Muriendo, Tierra Misteriosa, Caprichos, La pluma o la espada
- Website: www.astridhadad.com

Astrid Hadad (born 1957) is a Mexican singer and performer, mostly known for her irreverent political cabaret performances where she uses her own body as the scenic stage for all the symbols of Mexicanness (mexicanidad in Spanish) and excessive femininity through her costuming. Hadad was born in Chetumal, Quintana Roo, Mexico and currently lives in Mexico City. Of Mayan and Lebanese heritage, growing up near the Belize border and able to hear Caribbean radio stations coming from Cuba has been hugely influential on her heterogeneous perspective on social and cultural national life. Coupled with that, her incessant desire to critique the powers that be, her background as a political science major in college, her ongoing explorations in non-traditional theatrical forms, is all that fuels Hadad's unique political cabaret performances. As Roselyn Constantino has written, "[o]ut of Hadad's meditations on the multiplicity of influences shaping her and other Mexican's [sic] sense of themselves, and on the violence implicity [sic] in that process, emerge performances featuring a fast-paced, fragmented, parodic unveiling of traditional Mexican song, dress, and dance. Hadad avails herself of the humorous sociopolitical criticism of cabaret, carpa, and teatro de revista—important theatrical styles in Mexican cultural history."

== Education ==
Before moving to Mexico City to attend the National Autonomous University of Mexico's Theatre School (Centro Universitario de Teatro), Hadad was enrolled at the Universidad Veracruzana where she was a political science and journalism major.

== Early career ==
After appearing in a number of theatrical shows, she came to the fore in 1985 in Donna Giovanni, an all-female adaptation of Mozart's opera, which was directed by Jesusa Rodríguez and became a hit in Europe. It closed after its 500th performance, in the Palacio de Bellas Artes in Mexico City. Also in the 1980s, a major television appearance was her role as Margarita in the Televisa-produced telenovela Teresa (1989), which starred fellow Mexican Lebanese actor Salma Hayek. In the early 1990s, Hadad was cast in the role of Teresa de Teresa in Alfonso Cuarón's first full-feature film, Sólo con tu pareja (Only With Your Partner), a film that, although lighthearted and comedic, includes AIDS in its story, something not openly discussed in the Mexican public sphere at that time. This multi-faceted set of experiences, coupled with Hadad's desire to interpret popular songs from the Latin American / Mexican songbook in her own particular way and her research interest in the history of German and French styles of cabaret and early twentieth century Mexican popular theater forms, like teatro de carpa (itinerant tent theater) and teatro de revista (revue theater), led to her explorations of political cabaret in the late 1980s and early 1990s.

== Early political cabaret performances and influences ==
Hadad's initial explorations into political cabaret were a result of the freedom she found within earlier forms of cabaret, both in form (due to its playfulness and mixture of music, voice/singing, and theater) and content (sexual permissiveness and political satire). But it was not about reproducing European modes of cabaret, Hadad was also interested in Mexican popular theater (teatro de carpa and teatro de revista), humor, and style to begin to create her particular mode of political cabaret. Some of her early political cabaret shows included: Nostalgia Arrabalera and Del Rancho a la Ciudad. Due to the interest and use of ranchera music in these, led to Hadad to produce and star in the tragicomic musical La Occisa or Luz, Levántate y Lucha based on the life of Mexican singer Lucha Reyes (1904-1944), a relatively famous ranchera singer, but who had gone into obscurity by the second half of the twentieth century. Hadad began to claim Reyes as the one who initiated the canto bravío (what later became ranchera music) in Mexico, but has not received this credit. Hadad states in an interview in 1997 "traditionally women would sing the campirana song or bucolic songs with soft voices, with very high pitch. Women did not use the same force in singing compared to a man and Lucha (Reyes) is the one who initiates this type of ranchera singing in a bravía way among women. Because of that she changed the vernacular song". In addition to ranchera music, cabaret, teatro de carpa, and teatro de revista, films from the so-called golden age of Mexican cinema, especially the rumbera whose plots were set primarily in urban cabarets, were also highly influential in Hadad's visual and highly dramatic language. Lastly, Mexico's complex history of conquest and colonization, pre-Columbian iconography colonization, Catholic and religious syncretic symbols, historical figures, most specific women, and folk art, are all up for grab and form part of Hadad's universe in her political cabaret shows that are a mixture of music, song, dance, visual art, popular theater, satire.

== Notable political cabaret performances ==
Out of the production La Occisa or Luz, Levántate y Lucha came Hadad's collaboration with the musical group that has accompanied her since, Los Tarzanes. Together, they have created various performances (La Mujer Ladrina, Apocalipsis Ranchero, La Mujer del Golfo, etc.). In her Heavy Nopal show, Astrid makes use of iconic references, not just as scenery (the cactus, the rock, the pyramid, the tequila bottle), but also on her own body, becoming not only the stage, but also an altar. From the calla lilies to the extremely complex surprise-multi-purpose outfits to the innumerable ornaments, "rebozos", virgins of Guadalupe, guns, and common places in the essence of Mexico. Someone once described Astrid as a "walking museum of popular cultures."

Pecadora is a comic show that has women as a central theme, using Mary Magdalene, sinner par excellence, as the leading thread. It is a show that aims at rescuing the passion from the dangers of extinction where it can be currently found. In it, Astrid retakes the spirit of the rumberas, the soul of the rancheras and the historical body of everything Mexican. Of course, all this seasoned with a loud wardrobe, where hearts, gigantic eyes, turquoise-blue dresses and an old lantern, among others, play before the eyes of the audience.

In Sol y Sombra, taking as an inspiration the novel Dr. Jekyll and Mr. Hyde, Astrid presents a show where, setting the forces of evil against those of goodness, she leads us to reflect on (through her sense of humor) our inner ghosts as well as on the joys of life. This show boasts a colorful wardrobe and scenery, in which the use of "papel picado" is an important stage element. ("Papel picado" is a thin colored paper with different shapes cut out, used as a decoration on holidays in Mexico.) This show requires an arch-shaped structure to hang from as part of the scenery and the show. It is somewhat bulky to carry.

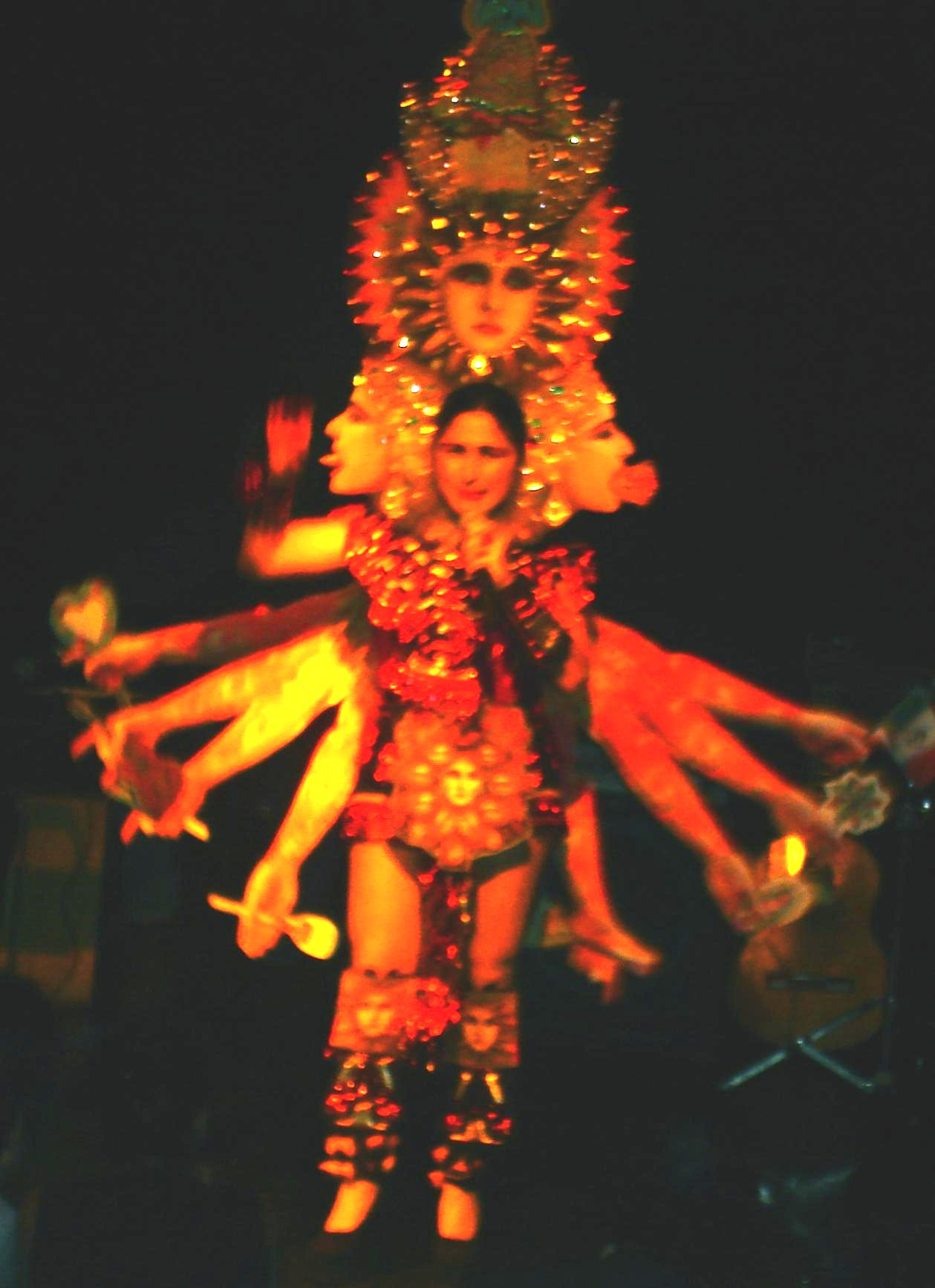
Dressed as a multi-limbed goddess (2006).

The last performance of the show called "Oh-diosas" (which is a play on words meaning something like "bitchies / Oh - goddesses") was at the end of the month of July 2006 in Mexico City, in one of the boroughs called Colonia Condesa.

Other shows by Hadad include Corazón sangrante and La multimamada. "Corazon Sangrante" is a 40s-style bolero and rumba that Hadad wrote of the Aztec king Montezuma whose "heart was bathed in chile" after he was betrayed by Cortez. "Where can I go, where can I put heart, so it won't hurt, won't bleed..." she croons as she dances across the stage in a velvet gown adorned with golden pyramids, an outfit she describes as representing the syncretic nature (European and Indigenous) of Mexican culture. If this sounds like a history lesson, it is, but it's hysterically funny. For her farewell number, she prances around the stage in a big sombrero with a moving rubber hand sticking up from the center. "Yes, this hand is for self-pleasure," she quips, "It comes in three speeds." The band picks up the tempo and Hadad reaches inside the brim to grab confetti, which she tosses into the air.

Astrid has also starred in TV soaps and in the film Sólo con tu pareja.

Astrid Hadad's discography includes recorded performances and singing.

== Discography ==
- 1990 - ¡Ay! (it was reissued twice as El Calcetín (The Sock) with different covers and added bonuses)
- 1995 - Corazón Sangrante (Bleeding Heart)
- 1998 - Mexican Divas (participación especial, recopilaciones) (Compilation)
- 2000 - Heavy Nopal en vivo (Heavy Nopal Live)
- 2000 - Cabaret 2000 (recopilación de canciones), con Eugenia León y Liliana Felipe. (Compilation)
- 2003 - La Cuchilla (The blade)
- 2004 - Soy Virgencita y mucho más... (I am a virgin) (Compilation)
- 2007 – Pecadora (Sinner)
- 2007 - ¡Oh! Diosas (Oh! Goddesses)
- 2011 - Tierra Misteriosa (Mysterious Land)
- 2013 - Vivir Muriendo (Living & dying)
- 2017 - Caprichos (Caprices)
- 2022 - La Pluma o La Espada (The Pen or the Sword)

== Films ==
- 1991 – Film Sólo con tu pareja, Director Alfonso Cuarón
- 2014 – Cabaret singer in Amor de Mis Amores of Manolo Caro

== Television ==
- Soap operas (telenovelas), e.g. Teresa, Televisa Mexico
- HBO: Pecadora, Heavy Nopal and documentaries for the BBC and HBO
