= Alfonso Cuarón =

Mexican filmmaker (born 1961)

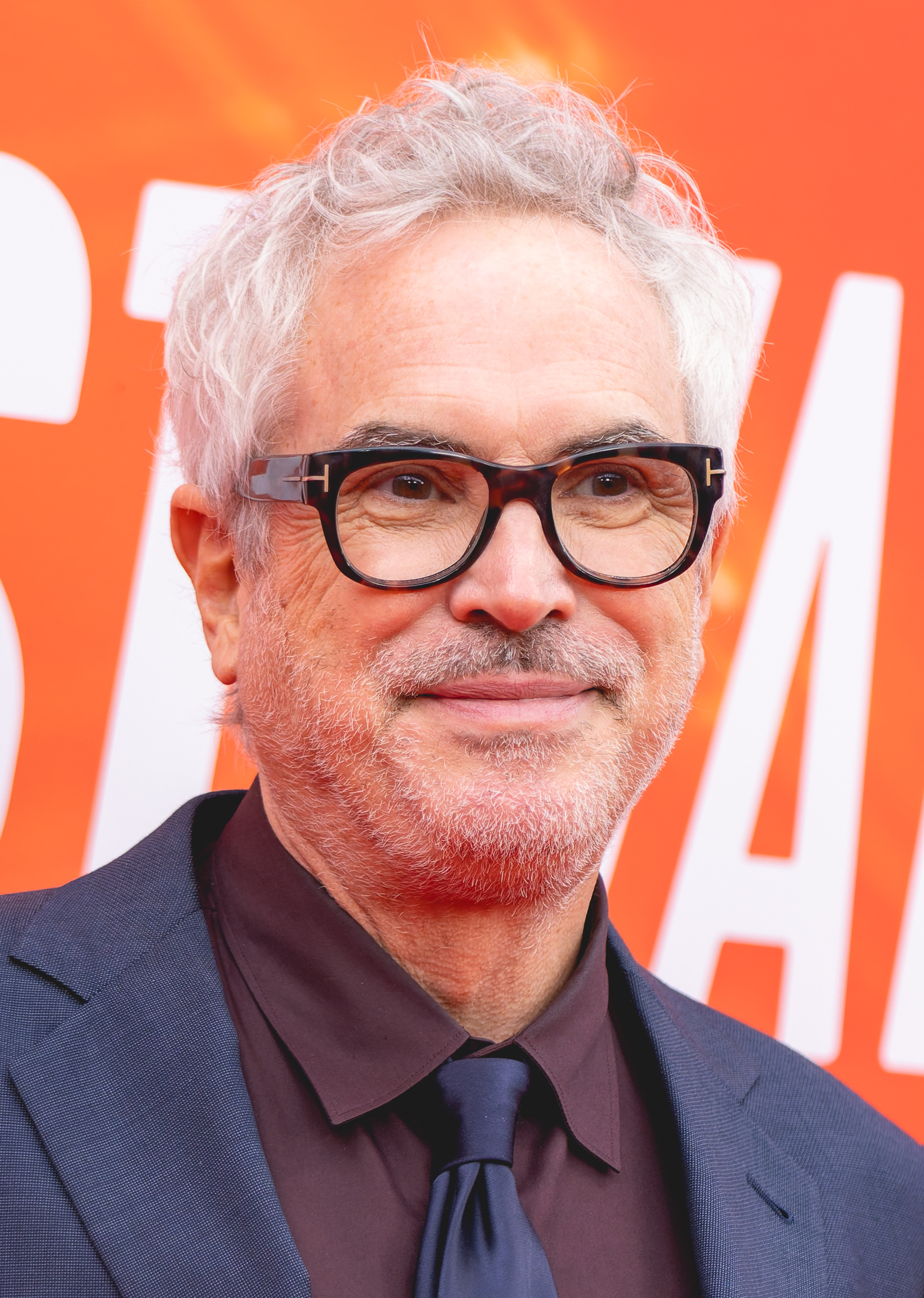
- Cuarón in 2024
- Born: Alfonso Cuarón Orozco; 28 November 1961 (age 64); Mexico City, Mexico
- Education: National Autonomous University of Mexico
- Occupations: Film director; film producer; screenwriter; cinematographer; film editor
- Years active: 1981–present
- Notable work: Full list
- Spouses: Mariana Elizondo (m. 1980; div. 1993) Annalisa Bugliani (m. 2001; div. 2008)
- Children: 3, including Jonás
- Relatives: Carlos Cuarón (brother)
- Awards: Full list

Alfonso Cuarón Orozco (US: /kwɑːˈroʊn/ kwar-OHN; Spanish: [alˈfonso kwaˈɾon]; born 28 November 1961) is a Mexican filmmaker. His accolades include four Academy Awards, three Golden Globe Awards, seven BAFTA Awards and one Golden Lion as well as a nomination for a Grammy Award.

Cuarón made his feature film debut with the romantic comedy Sólo con tu pareja (1991), and directed the film adaptations A Little Princess (1995), and Great Expectations (1998). His breakthrough came with the coming-of-age film Y tu mamá también (2001) which earned him a nomination for the Academy Award for Best Original Screenplay and won him the Venice Film Festival Award for Best Screenplay. He gained greater prominence for directing the fantasy film Harry Potter and the Prisoner of Azkaban (2004), the dystopian drama Children of Men (2006), the science fiction drama Gravity (2013), and the semi-autobiographical drama Roma (2018). The latter two won him Academy Awards for Best Director. He also won Best Film Editing for Gravity and Best Cinematography for Roma.

== Early life and education ==
Alfonso Cuarón Orozco was born 28 November 1961 in Mexico City, the son of Alfredo Cuarón, a doctor specializing in nuclear medicine, and Cristina Orozco, a pharmaceutical biochemist. He has a sister Christina, and two brothers; Carlos, also a filmmaker, and Alfredo, a conservation biologist.

Cuarón studied philosophy at the National Autonomous University of Mexico and filmmaking at the Centro Universitario de Estudios Cinematográficos, a school within the same university. There he met the director Carlos Marcovich and cinematographer Emmanuel Lubezki, and they made what would be his first short film, Vengeance Is Mine. He was expelled from the school, and worried that he would never be employed in the film industry.

== Career ==
=== 1990–1999: Rise to prominence ===
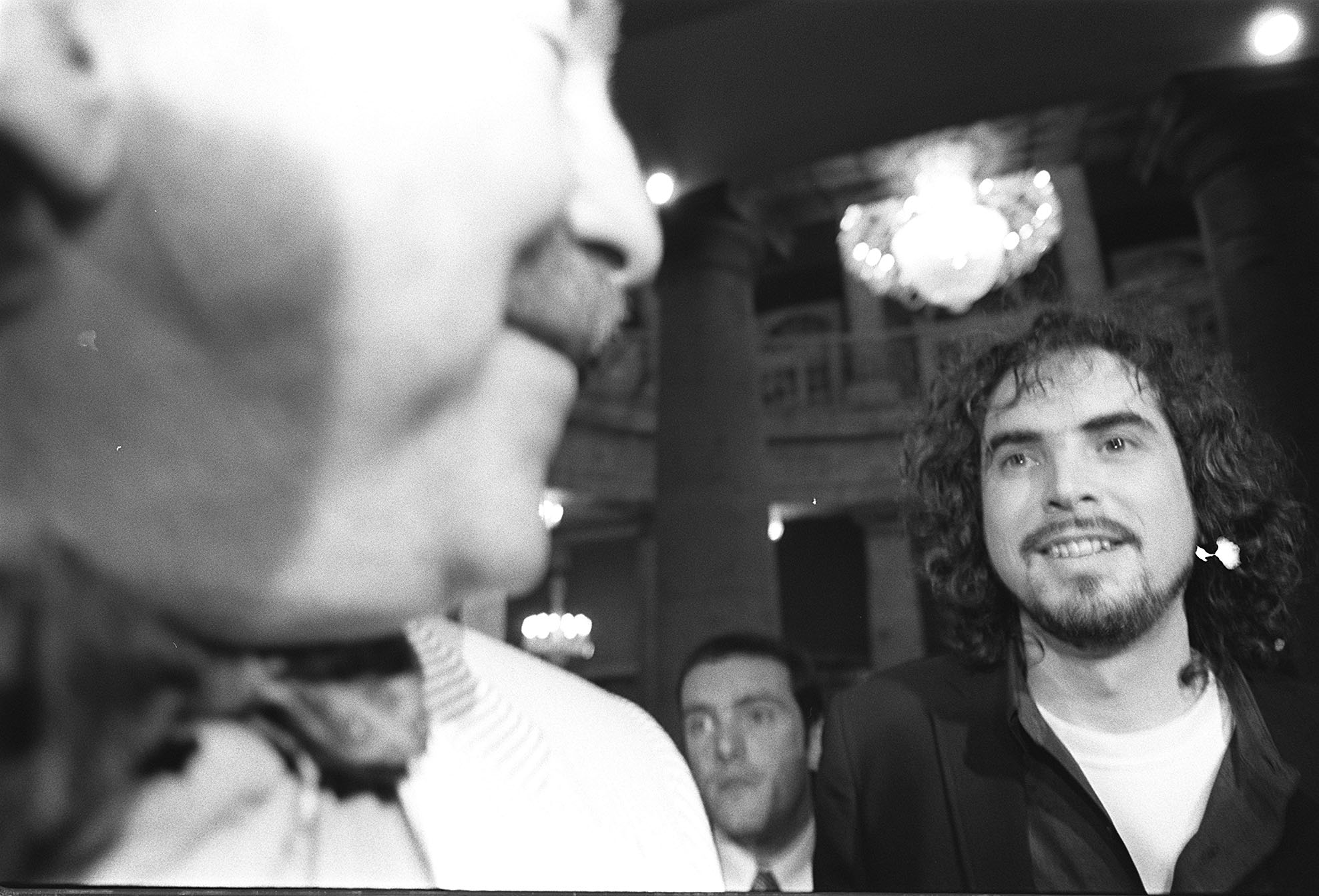
Cuarón at the Guadalajara International Film Festival in 1998.

Cuarón began working on television in Mexico, first as a technician and then as a director. His television work led to assignments as an assistant director for several film productions including La Gran Fiesta (1985), Gaby: A True Story (1987) and Romero (1989). In 1991 he landed his first big-screen directorial assignment, Sólo con tu pareja, a sex comedy about a womanizing businessman (played by Daniel Giménez Cacho) who, after having sex with an attractive nurse, is fooled into believing he's contracted AIDS. In addition to writing, producing and directing, Cuarón co-edited the film with Luis Patlán. The film, which also starred cabaret singer Astrid Hadad and model/actress Claudia Ramírez (with whom Cuarón was linked between 1989 and 1993) was a big hit in Mexico. After this success, director Sydney Pollack hired Cuarón to direct an episode of Fallen Angels, a series of neo-noir stories produced for the Showtime premium cable network in 1993; other directors who worked on the series included Steven Soderbergh, Jonathan Kaplan, Peter Bogdanovich, and Tom Hanks. The episode was entitled, "Murder, Obliquely" (1993) starring Laura Dern, Alan Rickman, and Diane Lane.

In 1995, Cuarón released his first feature film produced in the United States, A Little Princess, an adaptation of Frances Hodgson Burnett's classic 1905 novel of the same name. The film received critical acclaim with Janet Maslin of The New York Times declaring, "[the film] is a bright, beautiful and enchantingly childlike vision", one that "draw[s] its audience into the wittily heightened reality of a fairy tale" and "takes enough liberties to re-invent rather than embalm Miss Burnett's assiduously beloved story". The film went on to receive two Academy Award nominations for Best Cinematography and Best Production Design. Cuarón's next feature was also a literary adaptation, a modernized version of Charles Dickens's Great Expectations starring Ethan Hawke, Gwyneth Paltrow, and Robert De Niro. The film received mixed reviews. Russell Smith of The Austin Chronicle did however praise the film writing, "What's truly intriguing about this film, though, is the stylishness with which Cuaron (A Little Princess) reinvents Dickens' hoary, often-remade tale. This Great Expectations has a seductive, enchanting feel that has nothing to do with sweet, gauzy sentiments or calculatedly "magical" Hollywood imagery". Still, Great Expectations managed to earn $55 million at the global box office, surpassing its $25 million production budget.

=== 2000–2009: Career breakthrough and success ===
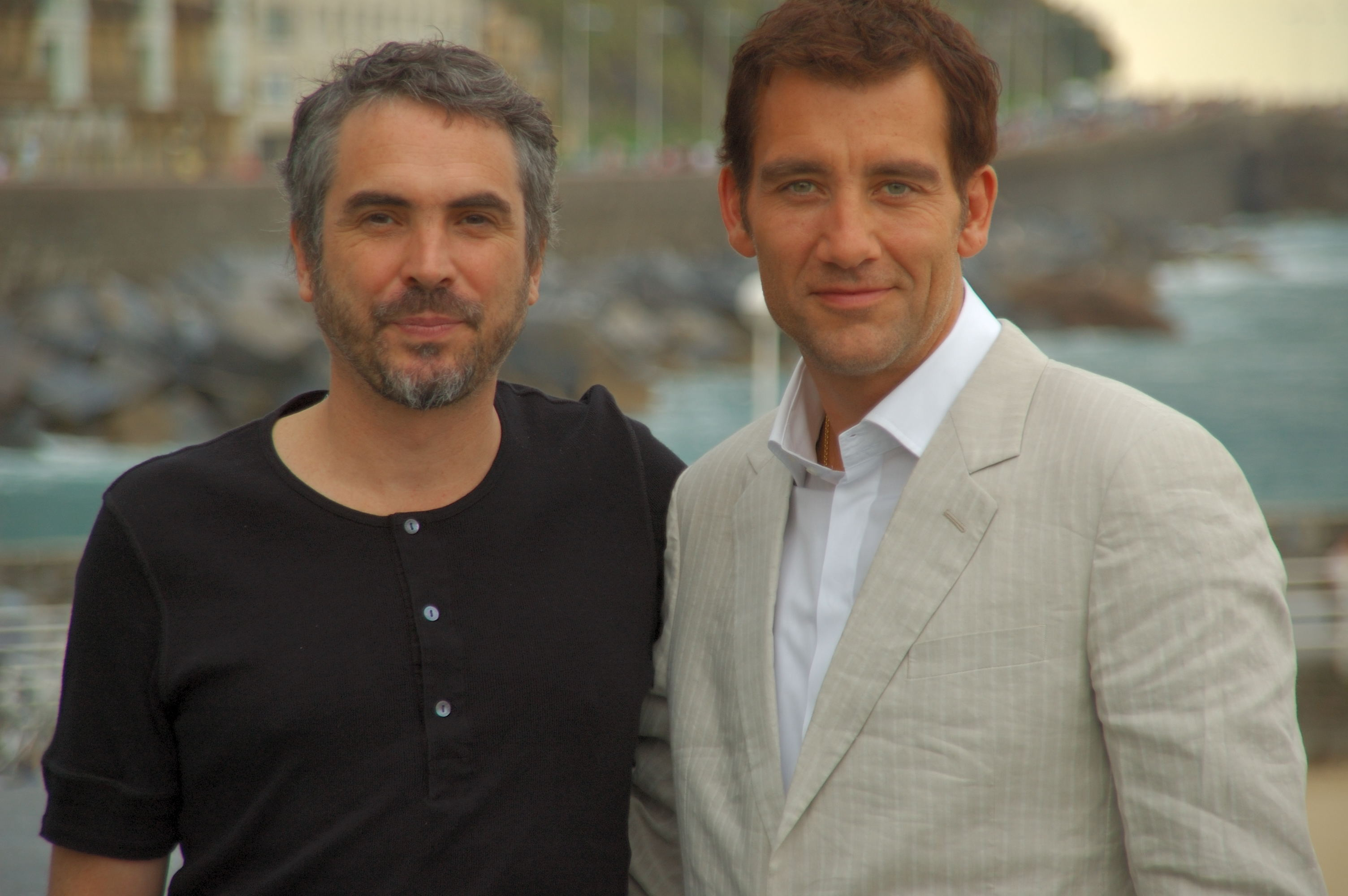
Cuarón and Clive Owen. They worked together on Children of Men.

In 2001, Cuarón found himself returning to Mexico with a Spanish-speaking cast to film Y tu mamá también, starring Gael García Bernal, Diego Luna and Maribel Verdú. It was a provocative and controversial road comedy about two sexually obsessed teenagers who take an extended road trip with an attractive married woman who is much older than they. The film's open portrayal of sexuality and frequent rude humor, as well as the politically and socially relevant asides, made the film an international hit and a major success with critics. The film was distributed through IFC in America allowing the film to collect $13.8 million in the United States, unparalleled at the time for Latin American films. Critic Roger Ebert of The Chicago Sun-Times wrote, "It is clear Cuaron is a gifted director, and here he does his best work to date." Cuarón shared an Academy Award nomination for Best Original Screenplay with co-writer and brother Carlos Cuarón.

In 2004, Cuarón directed the third film in the Harry Potter series, Harry Potter and the Prisoner of Azkaban. Cuarón faced criticism at the time from some Harry Potter fans for his approach to the film, notably its tendency to take more creative liberties with the source material than its predecessors. However, author J. K. Rowling, who had seen and loved Cuarón's film Y tu mamá también, said that it was her personal favorite from the series so far. Critically, the film was also better received than the first two installments, with some critics remarking its new tone and for being the first Harry Potter film to truly capture the essence of the novels. It has been subsequently rated by audience polls and critics as the best of the movie franchise series. The film earned two Academy Award nominations for Best Visual Effects and Best Original Score for John Williams.

In 2006, Cuarón's feature Children of Men, an adaptation of the P. D. James novel starring Clive Owen, Julianne Moore, and Michael Caine, received wide critical acclaim including three Academy Award nominations. Cuarón himself received two nominations for his work on the film, in Best Film Editing (with Alex Rodríguez) and Best Adapted Screenplay (with several collaborators).

He created the production and distribution company Esperanto Filmoj ("Esperanto Films", named because of his support for the international language Esperanto), which has credits in the films Duck Season, Pan's Labyrinth, and Gravity. He was also a co-founder of the production company, the "Tequila Gang" together with filmmaker Guillermo del Toro, screenwriter Laura Esquivel, producer Berta Navarro and sales agent Rosa Bosch. Cuarón directed the controversial public service announcement I Am Autism (2009) for Autism Speaks that was criticized by disability rights groups for its negative portrayal of autism.

=== 2010–present: Awards recognition ===
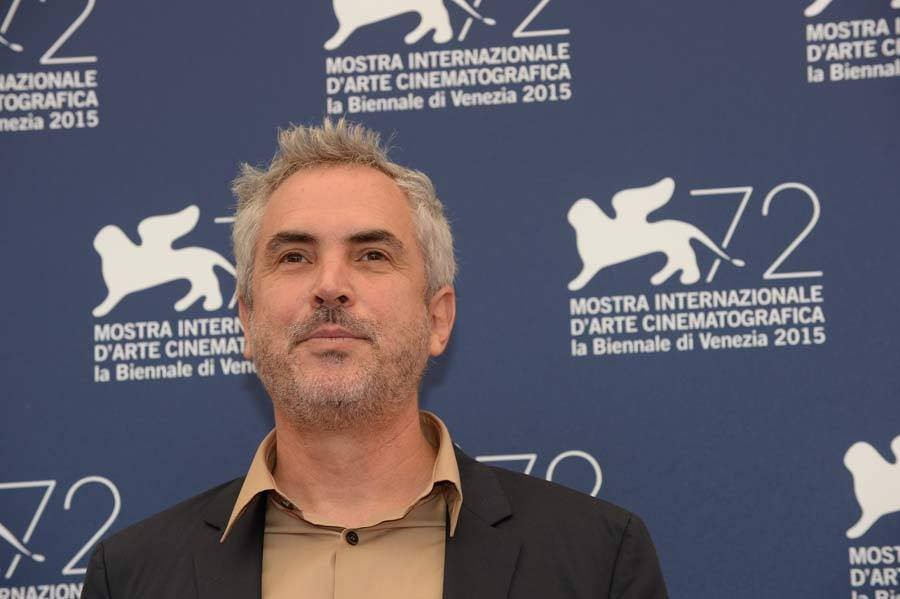
Cuaron at the 72nd Venice International Film Festival

In 2010, Cuarón began to develop the film Gravity, a drama set in space. He was joined by producer David Heyman, with whom Cuarón worked on Harry Potter and the Prisoner of Azkaban. Starring Sandra Bullock and George Clooney, the film opened the 70th Venice International Film Festival in August. The film was then released in America in October 2013. The film became a financial success, earning 723.2 million at the box office against a budget of 130 million. The film also received many awards nominations. For the film, he received the Golden Globe Award in the category of Best Director. The film received ten Academy Award nominations, including Best Picture and Best Director. Cuarón won for Best Directing, becoming the first Latin American to win the award, while he and Mark Sanger received the award for Best Film Editing.

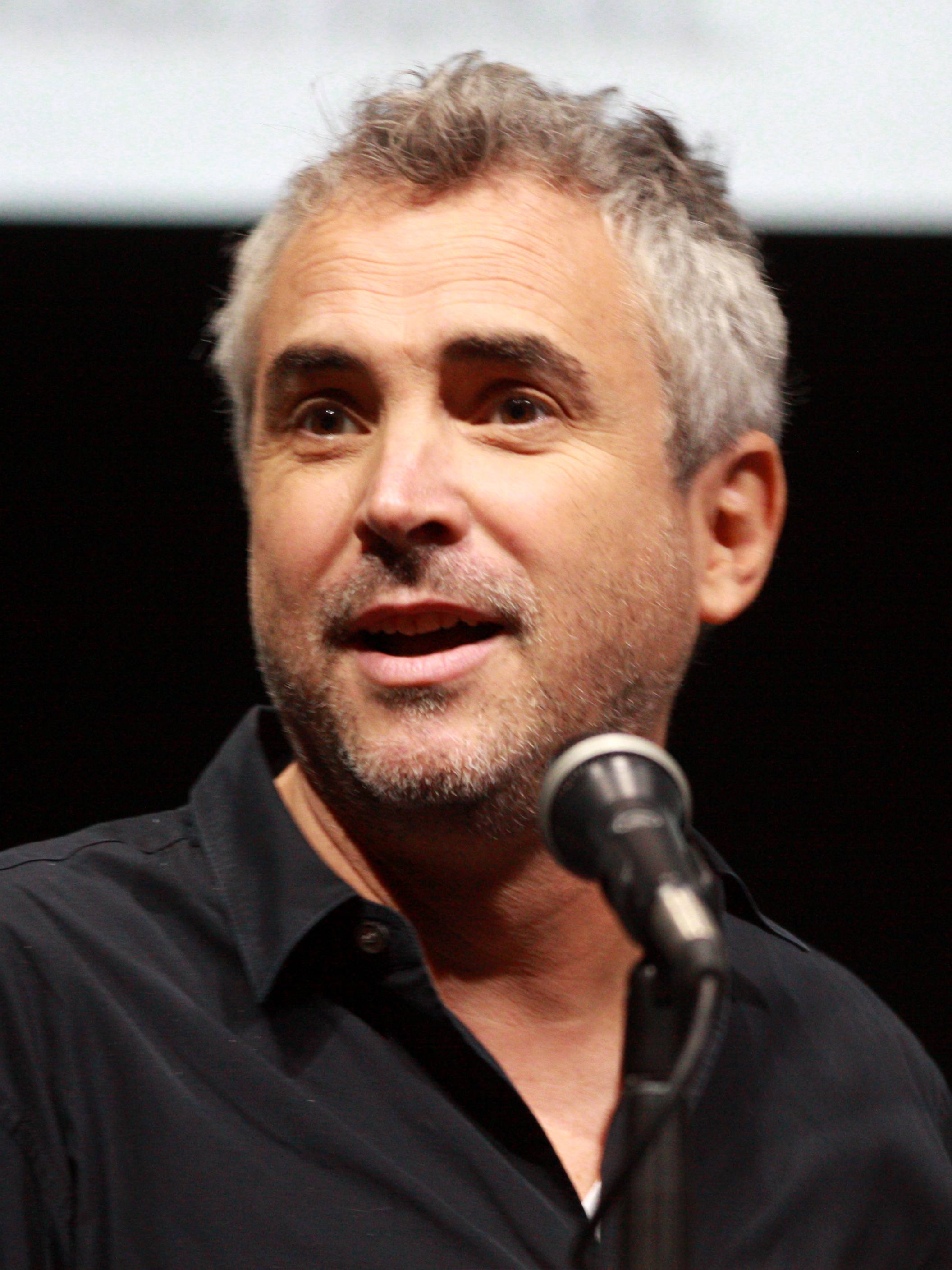
Cuarón in 2013

In 2013, Cuarón created Believe, a science fiction/fantasy/adventure series that was broadcast as part of the 2013–14 United States network television schedule on NBC as a mid-season entry. The series was created by Cuarón for Bad Robot and Warner Bros. Television. In 2014, Time placed him in its list of "100 Most Influential People in the World" – Pioneers.

In May 2015, Cuarón was announced as the president of the jury for the 72nd Venice International Film Festival.

Production began in fall 2016 for Cuarón's eighth film, Roma, a tale of a housekeeper for a middle class Mexican family in 1970s Mexico City, based on the life of his family's longtime maid, Liboria Rodríguez. The project was produced by Cuarón, Gabriela Rodríguez and Nicolás Celis and starred Yalitza Aparicio and Marina de Tavira both of whom received Oscar nominations. The film debuted at the 75th Venice International Film Festival, where it won the Golden Lion, and was distributed to select Mexican and American theaters before its online release on Netflix. Roma was highly acclaimed upon release; among its accolades are two Golden Globes (Golden Globe Award for Best Foreign Language Film and Best Director for Cuarón) and three Academy Awards (Best Director, Best Foreign Language Film, and Best Cinematography for Cuarón) out of a leading ten nominations.

In 2019, Cuaron signed an overall TV deal at Apple. His first series for Apple was the psychological thriller Disclaimer, starring Cate Blanchett, Kevin Kline, Louis Partridge and Sacha Baron Cohen; it is based on the eponymous novel by Renée Knight, with Cuaron writing and directing every episode.

== Style and themes ==
Cuarón's style is a mix of several mainstream Hollywood conventions while breaking from that dominant influence by taking an unorthodox approach that uses voiceover narration and by unconventionally lengthy shots. These longer cuts, narration, and often, moving cameras are more typical of documentary film.

In his first feature film the average shot length is around six seconds, and ten years later for Y tu mamá también the average increased to 19.6 seconds. The Prisoner of Azkaban had an average of 5 1/2 seconds, while the subsequent Children of Men had an extraordinary average of 16 seconds between cuts. A typical Hollywood movie cuts every two seconds. Cuarón's career shows mainstream Hollywood influences, which has spilled over to less mainstream films made outside of Hollywood. Children of Men was influenced by disaster and science fiction movie conventions. The Prisoner of Azkaban was a continuation of Cuarón's take on the coming-of-age genre after Y Tu Mama Tambien. That film is in the form of an American road movie, along with teen movie elements.

The voice-over narration in Y tu mamá también contains political messages; Cuarón tackles Mexican identity and sovereignty. With the backdrop of the 1990s and the advent of NAFTA and neoliberalism in Mexico, Cuarón critiques Mexico for the path they are heading towards a globalized economy and world. Cuarón also addresses aspects of Mexican history, such as colonialism and the long unfulfilled promises of the Mexican Revolution of 1910. In Y tu mamá también, the narrator states that a new political party is in power, but hints that no real change will come about. This is also supported with one of the main characters, Julio, sharing a last name with the Mexican revolutionary Emiliano Zapata, yet the name does not push Julio into action; he lacks the initiative and interest in the country.

== Personal life ==
Cuarón's first marriage was to Mariana Elizondo with whom he has a son, Jonás Cuarón, born in 1981. Jonás is also a film director, known for Year of the Nail and Desierto. Alfonso's second marriage, from 2001 to 2008, was to Italian actress and freelance journalist Annalisa Bugliani, with whom he has two children.

He has publicly shown his fascination for the Esperanto language and his support for the Esperanto movement. He called his production company Esperanto Filmoj. In October 2023, Cuarón signed an open letter from artists to US President Joe Biden calling for a ceasefire of Israeli bombardment in Gaza.

Cuarón is a vegetarian and has been living in London since 2000.

== Filmography ==
Directed features
Year	Title	Distributor
1991	Sólo con tu pareja	Warner Bros.
1995	A Little Princess	Warner Bros.
1998	Great Expectations	20th Century Fox
2001	Y tu mamá también	IFC Films
2004	Harry Potter and the Prisoner of Azkaban	Warner Bros. Pictures
2006	Children of Men	Universal Pictures
2013	Gravity	Warner Bros. Pictures
2018	Roma	Netflix

== Awards and nominations ==
Awards and nominations received by Cuaron's films
Year	Title	Academy Awards		BAFTA Awards		Golden Globe Awards	
Year	Title	Nominations	Wins	Nominations	Wins	Nominations	Wins
1995	A Little Princess	2					
2001	Y tu mamá también	1		2		1	
2004	Harry Potter and the Prisoner of Azkaban	2		4			
2006	Children of Men	3		3	2		
2013	Gravity	10	7	11	6	4	1
2018	Roma	10	3	7	4	3	2
Total		28	10	27	12	8	3

Directed Academy Award performances
Under Cuarón's direction, these actresses have received Academy Award nominations for their performances in their respective roles.

Year	Performer	Film	Result
Academy Award for Best Actress
2013	Sandra Bullock	Gravity	Nominated
2018	Yalitza Aparicio	Roma	Nominated
Academy Award for Best Supporting Actress
2018	Marina de Tavira	Roma	Nominated

== See also ==
- Esperanto Filmoj
- Cha Cha Cha Films
- Cinema of Mexico
- List of Mexican Academy Award winners and nominees
- List of people who have won multiple Academy Awards in a single year
- List of Academy Award records
