= Jonás Cuarón =

Mexican film director

- Cuarón in 2026
- Born: 1983 (age 42–43)
- Years active: 2007–present
- Spouse: Eireann Harper (m. 2007)
- Parent: Alfonso Cuarón
- Relatives: Carlos Cuarón (paternal uncle)

Jonás Cuarón Elizondo (born 1983) is a Mexican film director, screenwriter, producer, editor and cinematographer. He is the son of the Academy Award-winner Alfonso Cuarón and his first wife, Mariana Elizondo.

Cuarón studied film at Vassar College. His first feature film, Year of the Nail (Año uña) which he directed, wrote and produced, was released in 2007. He co-wrote the 2013 film Gravity with his father, who directed it.

His uncle, Carlos Cuarón, is also a writer and director and his half-brother, Diego Cataño, is an actor. His first film credit is a cameo as a child in the 1991 film Sólo con tu pareja, which was directed by his father.

== Filmography ==
Film

Year	Title	Director	Writer	Producer	Editor	Notes
2007	Año uña	Yes	Yes	Yes	Yes	Also art director and cinematographer
2013	Gravity	No	Yes	No	No	
2015	Desierto	Yes	Yes	Yes	Yes	
2023	Chupa	Yes	No	No	No	
2026	Campéon Gabacho	Yes	Yes	Yes	Yes	

Short film

Year	Title	Director	Writer	Producer	Editor	Notes
2007	The Shock Doctrine	Yes	No	Executive	Yes	Documentary short; Also cinematographer
2013	Domingo	No	No	Executive	No	
2014	Aningaaq	Yes	Yes	Yes	Yes	Spin-off of Gravity, included as a bonus on the DVD

Television

Year	Title	Director	Writer	Executive Producer	Note
TBA	Hombre	Yes	Yes	Yes	Pilot episode

Acting roles

Year	Title	Role	Notes
1991	Sólo con Tu Pareja	Kid at Wedding	
1995	A Little Princess	Jim (the Chimney sweep boy)	Uncredited; Also credited as staff assistant
