= Gravity (2013 film) =

Science fiction thriller by Alfonso Cuarón

- Theatrical release poster
- Directed by: Alfonso Cuarón
- Written by: Alfonso Cuarón; Jonás Cuarón
- Produced by: Alfonso Cuarón; David Heyman
- Starring: Sandra Bullock; George Clooney
- Cinematography: Emmanuel Lubezki
- Edited by: Alfonso Cuarón; Mark Sanger
- Music by: Steven Price
- Production companies: Heyday Films; Esperanto Filmoj
- Distributed by: Warner Bros. Pictures
- Release dates: August 28, 2013 (Venice); October 4, 2013 (United States); November 7, 2013 (United Kingdom)
- Running time: 91 minutes
- Countries: United Kingdom; United States
- Language: English
- Budget: $80–130 million
- Box office: $723.2 million

Gravity is a 2013 science fiction thriller film directed by Alfonso Cuarón, who also co-wrote, co-edited, and produced the film. It stars Sandra Bullock and George Clooney as American astronauts who attempt to return to Earth after the destruction of their Space Shuttle in orbit.

Cuarón wrote the screenplay with his son Jonás and attempted to develop the film at Universal Pictures. Later, the distribution rights were acquired by Warner Bros. Pictures. David Heyman, who previously worked with Cuarón on Harry Potter and the Prisoner of Azkaban (2004), produced the film with him. Gravity was produced entirely in the United Kingdom, where British visual effects company Framestore spent more than three years creating most of the film's visual effects, which involve over 80 of its 91 minutes.

Gravity opened the 70th Venice International Film Festival on August 28, 2013, and had its North American premiere three days later at the Telluride Film Festival. Upon its release, Gravity was met with widespread critical acclaim, with high praise for its direction, visuals, cinematography, acting, and score. Considered one of the best films of 2013, it appeared on numerous critics' year-end lists, and was selected by the American Film Institute in their annual Movies of the Year list. The film became the eighth-highest-grossing film of the year with a worldwide gross of over $723 million, against a production budget of around $100 million.

Gravity received a leading 10 nominations at the 86th Academy Awards, including Best Picture and Best Actress (for Bullock), and won a leading seven awards, including Best Director (for Cuarón). At the 67th British Academy Film Awards, the film received a leading 11 nominations, including Best Film and Best Actress in a Leading Role (for Bullock), and won a leading 6 awards, including Outstanding British Film and Best Director (for Cuarón). It also received 4 nominations at the 71st Golden Globe Awards, including Best Motion Picture – Drama and Best Actress in a Motion Picture – Drama (for Bullock), with Cuarón winning Best Director.

At the 19th Critics' Choice Awards, the film received 10 nominations, including Best Picture and Best Actress (for Bullock), and won a leading seven awards, including Best Sci-Fi/Horror Movie, Best Director (for Cuarón) and Best Actress in an Action Movie (for Bullock). Bullock also received a nomination for the Screen Actors Guild Award for Outstanding Performance by a Female Actor in a Leading Role, while the film won the 2013 Ray Bradbury Award, and the 2014 Hugo Award for Best Dramatic Presentation. Since its release, it has been cited as among the best films of the 2010s and the 21st century. (Note: Attributed to multiple references:)

== Plot ==
The Space Shuttle Explorer, commanded by veteran astronaut Matt Kowalski, is in Earth orbit to service the Hubble Space Telescope. Dr. Ryan Stone is aboard on her first space mission, to perform hardware upgrades on the telescope.

During a spacewalk, Mission Control in Houston warns Explorer's crew about a rapidly expanding cloud of space debris caused by the Russians shooting down a defunct spy satellite, and orders the crew to return to Earth immediately. Communication with Mission Control is lost shortly after, as more communication satellites are disabled by debris.

Debris strikes Explorer and Hubble, tearing Stone from the shuttle. Kowalski, using a Manned Maneuvering Unit (MMU), rescues her and they return to Explorer, discovering that it has suffered catastrophic damage and the rest of the crew are dead. Kowalski decides they should use the MMU to reach the International Space Station (ISS), which is in orbit about 1,450 km (900 mi) away. He estimates that they have 90 minutes before the debris field completes an orbit and threatens them again.

On their way to the ISS, the two discuss Stone's home life and her daughter, who died young in an accident. As they approach the station, they see that the ISS's crew has evacuated using one of its two Soyuz spacecraft, with the remaining craft exhibiting damage and unable to return to Earth. Kowalski suggests using it to travel to the nearby Chinese Tiangong space station, (Note: This Tiangong Space Station discussed here is Tiangong-1.) 100 km (60 mi) away, to board its similar Shenzhou spacecraft and return to Earth.

They try to grab onto the ISS, but only make tenuous connection to the Soyuz's parachute cords, which are not strong enough for them both. Despite Stone's protests, Kowalski detaches himself to save her from drifting away with him. Stone enters the ISS as Kowalski floats away. Unable to establish communication with him, she concludes that she is the mission's sole survivor.

Inside the station, a fire breaks out, forcing Stone to rush to the Soyuz. As she maneuvers it away from the ISS, the tangled parachute tethers snag, preventing the spacecraft from leaving. She performs a spacewalk to cut the cables, succeeding just as the debris field returns, destroying the station. Stone angles the Soyuz towards Tiangong but discovers that the engine has no fuel.

After an attempt at radio communication with an Inuk on Earth, Stone resigns herself to her fate and shuts off the cabin's oxygen supply to commit suicide. As she begins to lose consciousness, she experiences a hallucination of Kowalski telling her to rig the Soyuz's soft landing rockets to propel the capsule towards Tiangong. Stone regains the will to go on, restoring the spacecraft's oxygen flow and rigging the landing rockets accordingly.

Unable to dock with Tiangong, Stone ejects herself from the Soyuz and uses a fire extinguisher as a makeshift thruster to travel to the rapidly deorbiting station. She enters Tiangong's Shenzhou capsule just as the station enters the upper atmosphere, and undocks.

The Shenzhou capsule re-enters the atmosphere and lands in a lake. Radio communication from Houston informs Stone that she has been tracked on radar and that rescue crews are on their way. Stone opens the hatch and sheds her space suit, allowing her to reach the surface and crawl onto the beach before standing and walking away.

== Cast ==
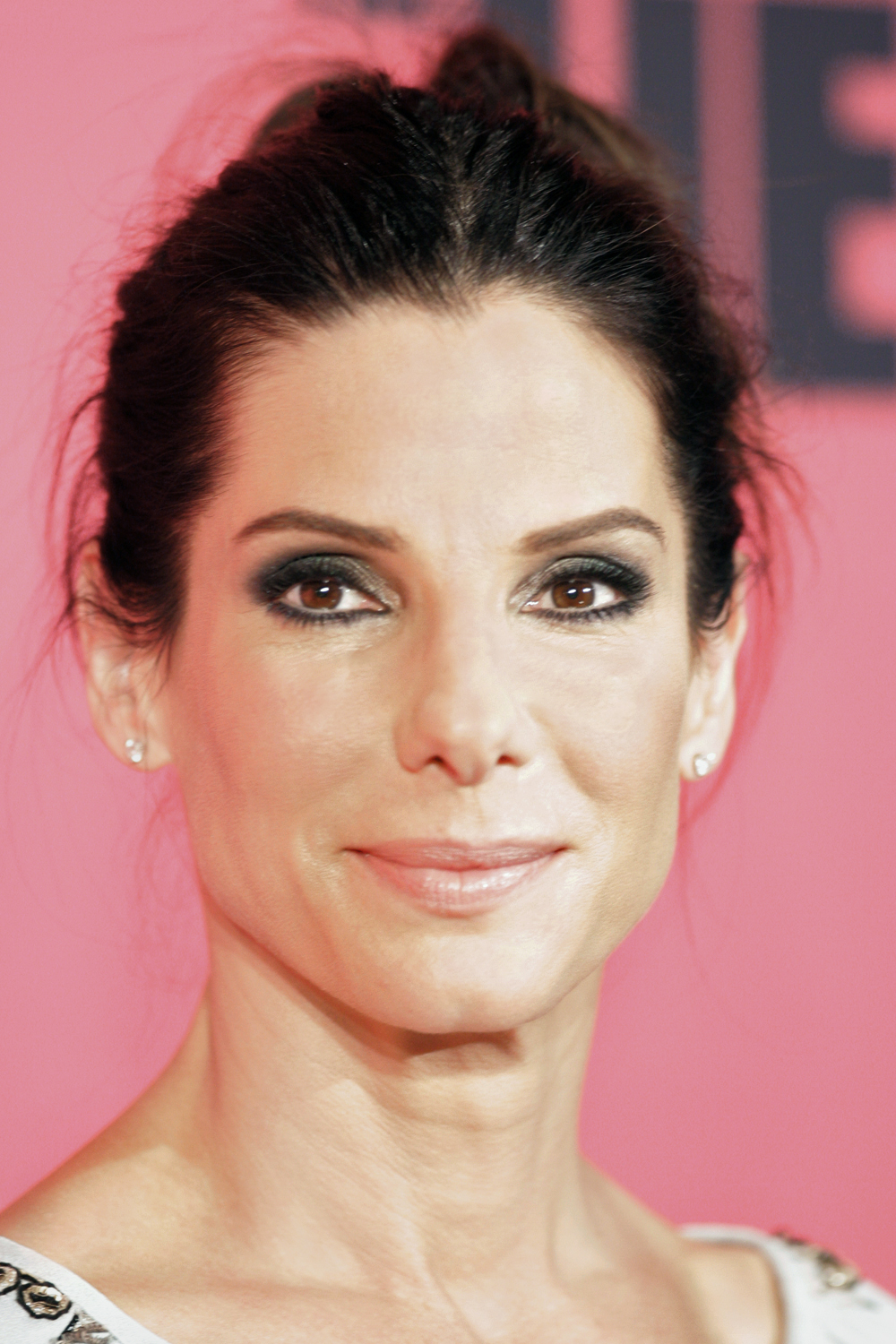
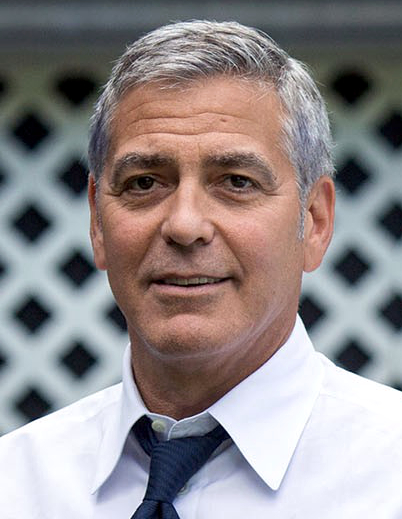
Sandra Bullock in 2013 (left) and George Clooney in 2016
- Sandra Bullock as Ryan Stone, a medical engineer and mission specialist from Lake Zurich, Illinois, who is on her first space mission. According to Cuarón, Stone is "a character who lives in her own bubble", and in the film "she's trapped in her space suit." Bullock's role was extremely demanding and daunting. She called the experience "lonely" and said she experienced "frustrating, painful isolation[...]but in the best way", and described her working day on the shoot as a "morose headspace". She was cast in 2010, just a few months after finalizing her divorce from Jesse James. The Hollywood Reporter estimated that Bullock would earn at least $70 million based on theatrical returns.
- George Clooney as Lieutenant Matthew "Matt" Kowalski, the commander of the team. Kowalski is a veteran astronaut planning to retire after the Explorer expedition. He enjoys telling stories about himself and joking with his team, and is determined to protect the lives of his fellow astronauts.
- Ed Harris as the voice of mission Control in Houston, Texas.
- Orto Ignatiussen as the voice of Aningaaq, a Greenlandic Inuk fisherman who intercepts one of Stone's transmissions. Aningaaq also appears in an eponymous short, written and directed by Gravity co-writer Jonás Cuarón, which depicts the conversation between him and Stone from his perspective.
- Phaldut Sharma as the voice of Shariff Dasari, the flight engineer on board the Explorer.
- Amy Warren as the voice of the captain of Explorer.
- Basher Savage as the voice of the captain of the International Space Station.

== Themes ==
Although Gravity is often considered to be a science fiction film, Cuarón told the BBC that he does not consider it such, rather seeing it as "a drama of a woman in space". According to him, the main theme of the film was "adversity" and he uses the debris as a metaphor for this.

Despite being set in space, the film uses motifs from shipwreck and wilderness survival stories about psychological change and resilience in the aftermath of a catastrophe. Cuarón uses the Stone character to illustrate clarity of mind, persistence, training, and improvisation in the face of isolation and the consequences of a relentless Murphy's law. The film incorporates spiritual or existential themes, in the facts of Stone's daughter's accidental and meaningless death, and in the necessity of summoning the will to survive in the face of overwhelming odds, without future certainties, and with the impossibility of rescue from personal dissolution without finding this willpower. Calamities occur but only the surviving astronauts see them.

The impact of scenes is heightened by alternating between objective and subjective perspectives, the warm face of the Earth and the depths of dark space, the chaos and unpredictability of the debris field, and silence in the vacuum of space with the background score giving the desired effect. The film uses very long, uninterrupted shots throughout to draw the audience into the action, but contrasts these with claustrophobic shots within space suits and capsules.

Human evolution and the resilience of life may also be seen as key themes of Gravity. The film opens with the exploration of space—the vanguard of human civilization—and ends with an allegory of the dawn of mankind when Ryan Stone fights her way out of the water after the crash-landing, passing a frog, grabs the soil, and slowly regains her capacity to stand upright and walk. Director Cuarón said, "She's in these murky waters almost like an amniotic fluid or a primordial soup, in which you see amphibians swimming. She crawls out of the water, not unlike early creatures in evolution. And then she goes on all fours. And after going on all fours she's a bit curved until she is completely erect. It was the evolution of life in one, quick shot". Earlier imagery depicting the formation of life includes a scene after Stone enters the space station airlock, and rests in an embryonic position, surrounded by a rope strongly resembling an umbilical cord. The film also suggests themes of humanity's ubiquitous strategy of existential resilience; that, across cultures, individuals must postulate meaning, beyond material existence, wherever none can be perceived.

Some commentators have noted possible religious themes in the film. For instance, Robert Barron in The Catholic Register summarizes the tension between Gravity's technology and religious symbolism. He said, "The technology which this film legitimately celebrates ... can't save us, and it can't provide the means by which we establish real contact with each other. The Ganges in the sun, the Saint Christopher icon, the statue of Budai, and above all, a visit from a denizen of heaven, signal that there is a dimension of reality that lies beyond what technology can master or access ... the reality of God".

== Production ==
=== Development ===
As a child, Alfonso Cuarón had an affinity for space programs, dreamed of becoming an astronaut, and would watch live Moon landings on television. He was seven years old when Apollo 11 landed on the Moon in 1969 and was profoundly influenced by Neil Armstrong. At that time, his grandmother bought a new television in order to be able to see the Moon landing. He watched space films, such as A Trip to the Moon (1902), and was further drawn to films featuring the technology of space exploration and trying to honor the laws of physics, such as Marooned (1969) and Woman in the Moon (1929).

In 2008, funding ran out on a project entitled A Boy and His Shoe written by Cuarón and his son Jonás. They wrote a first draft of what would become Gravity in three weeks. After they finished the screenplay, Cuarón attempted to develop his project at Universal Pictures, where it stayed in development hell. When co-chairmen Marc Shmuger and David Linde were ousted from Universal in 2009, Cuarón asked for the project to be released, and then Warner Bros. Pictures chief Jeff Robinov stepped in. After the rights to the project were sold, it began development at Warner Bros. Three years later, when the movie was still unfinished, Robinov was let go.

In 2014, author Tess Gerritsen filed a lawsuit against Warner Bros. for breach of contract, alleging that the film Gravity is an adaptation of her 1999 novel of the same name. The suit was dismissed twice in 2015.

=== Writing ===
Cuarón co-wrote the screenplay with his son Jonás. However, Cuarón never intended to make a space film. Before conceiving the story, he started out with a theme: adversity. He would discuss with Jonás survival scenarios in hostile, isolated locations, such as the desert (Jonás wrote a desert film, Desierto, which was released in 2015). Finally, he decided to take it to an extreme place where there was nothing: "I had this image of an astronaut spinning into space away from human communication. The metaphor was already so obvious." Scott Frank did an uncredited rewrite of the screenplay.

=== Casting ===
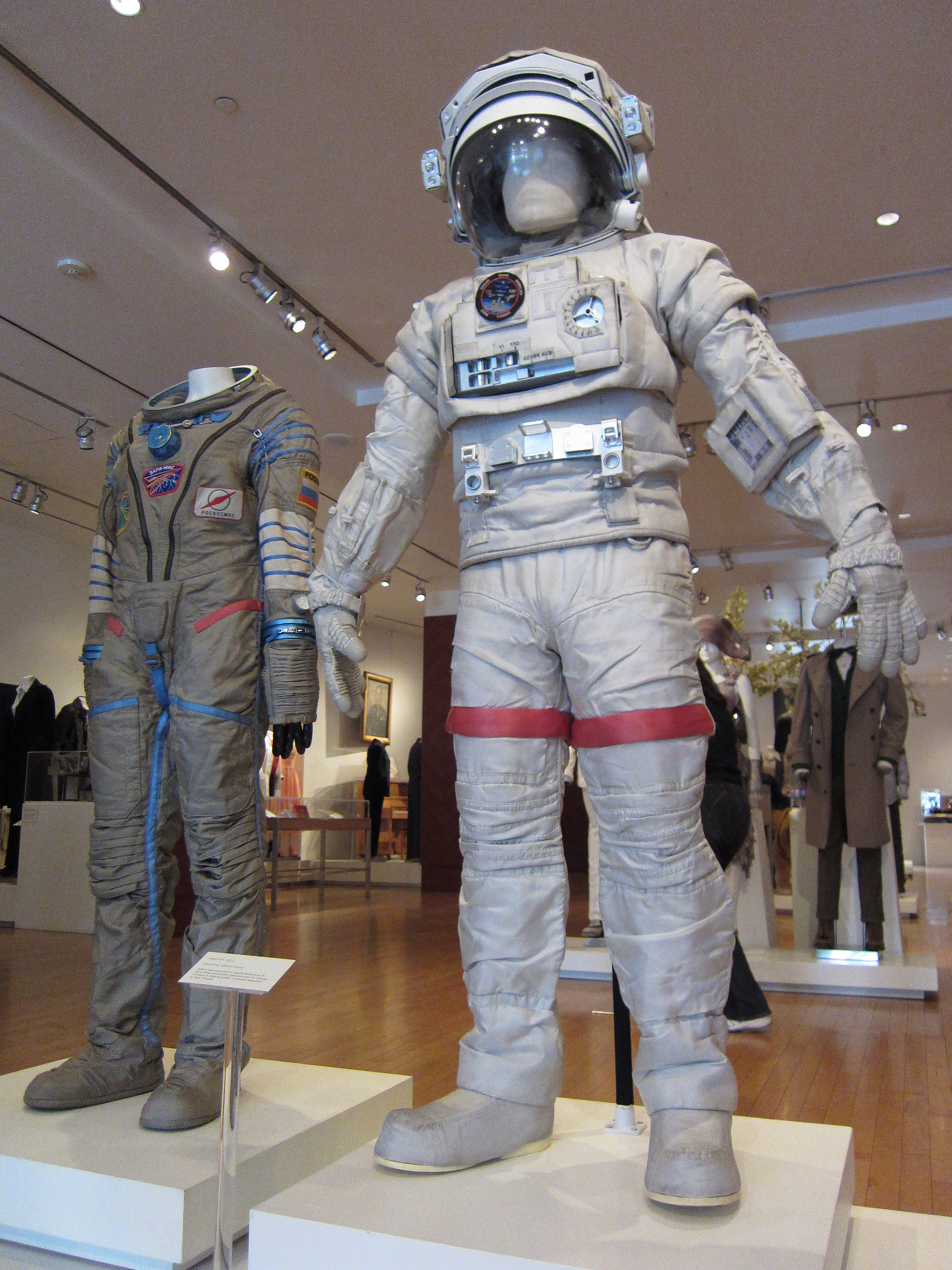
Costumes worn by Sandra Bullock (left) and George Clooney (right) and designed by Jany Temime

For the female role, Cuarón was in search of a lead that could "carry" the film, being the only person onscreen for a large part of the movie. In 2010, Angelina Jolie, who had rejected a sequel to Wanted (2008), was in contact with Warner Bros. to star in the film. Scheduling conflicts involving Jolie's Bosnian war film In the Land of Blood and Honey (2011), and a possible sequel to Salt (2010) led Jolie to end her involvement with Gravity, leaving Warner Bros. with doubts that the film would get made. The studio approached her for a second time to reconsider her former decision, but Jolie again declined.

In September 2010, Cuarón received approval from Warner Bros. to offer the role without a screen test to Natalie Portman, who was praised for her performance in Black Swan (2010) at that time. Portman rejected the project and announced that she was pregnant with her first child in December 2010. Other stars considered to some degree included Marion Cotillard (who was pregnant at the time and gave birth to her first child in May 2011, the same month that shooting for Gravity began), Naomi Watts, Carey Mulligan, Scarlett Johansson, Sienna Miller, Abbie Cornish, Rebecca Hall, Blake Lively and Olivia Wilde. Warner Bros. then approached Sandra Bullock for the role, and she was cast in October 2010. Bullock signed on to the film after Cuarón assured her that she would still be able to spend time with her recently adopted son while shooting the film. Bullock would later call her involvement in Gravity "the best life decision I think I ever made."

In March 2010, Robert Downey Jr. had entered discussions to be cast in the male lead role, but he left the project that November to star in How to Talk to Girls—a project in development with Shawn Levy attached to direct. In December, with Bullock signed for the co-lead role, George Clooney replaced Downey.

=== Filming ===
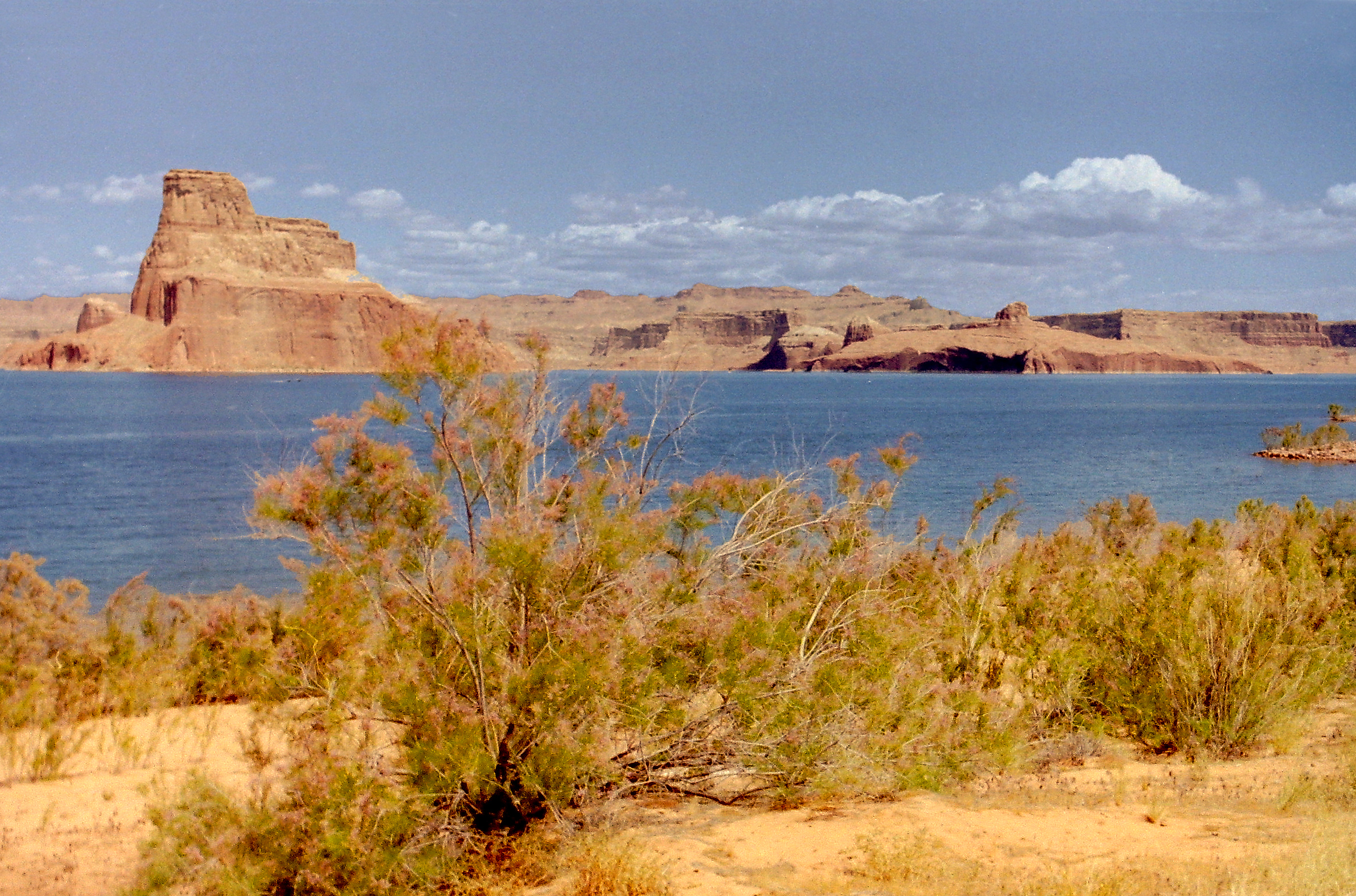
The landing scene was filmed at Lake Powell, Arizona.

Made on a production budget of $100 million, Gravity was shot digitally using Arri Alexa Classic cameras equipped with wide Arri Master Prime lenses. Most of the film is computer generated. In the majority of shots the only elements captured with a camera are the faces. The final scene, which takes place on Earth, was shot on an Arri 765 camera using 65 mm film to provide the sequence with a visual contrast to the rest of the film. CGI elements were shot at Pinewood and Shepperton Studios in the United Kingdom. The landing scene was filmed at Lake Powell, Arizona—where the astronauts' landing scene in Planet of the Apes (1968) was also filmed.

Principal photography began in London, on May 9, 2011. The film contains 156 shots, with an average length of 45 seconds—fewer and longer shots than in most films of its length. Although the first trailer had audible explosions and other sounds, these scenes are silent in the finished film. Cuarón said, "They put in explosions [in the trailer]. As we know, there is no sound in space. In the film, we don't do that." The soundtrack in the film's space scenes consists of the musical score and sounds astronauts would hear in their suits or in the space vehicles.

For most of Bullock's shots, she was placed inside a large mechanical rig with thousands of LED bulbs to simulate outer space. Getting into the "lightbox" rig took a significant amount of time, and so Bullock stayed in it for up to 10 hours a day, communicating through a headset. Costume Designer Jany Temime said the spacesuits were fictitious – "no space suit opens up at the front – but we had to do that in order for her to get out. So I had to redesign it and readapt all the functions of the suit for front opening." Cuarón said his biggest challenge was to make the set feel as inviting and non-claustrophobic as possible, including having a large celebration each day when Bullock arrived. Shooting long scenes in a simulated zero-g environment was a challenge, and so they used computer-generated imagery for the spacewalk scenes and automotive robots to move Bullock's character for interior space station scenes. Shots and blocking had to be planned well in advance for the robots to be programmed, which caused the production period to last for four and a half years. Cuarón had initially assumed it would take about a year to complete the film after completing the script. The lightbox was named one of 2013's best inventions by Time magazine, and is suggested as a breakthrough in entertainment technology comparable to the motion-capture technology of Avatar (2009), the battle-scene software of Lord of the Rings (2001–2003), and the "bullet time" effect of The Matrix (1999).

Warner Bros started screening the movie to test audiences well before it was finished, with crude animation instead of finished special effects. Initial feedback asked for monsters or aliens. Cuarón refused. It was only at the 2012 Comic-Con, where the opening sequence was successfully showcased, the studio was finally convinced the project could succeed.

=== Cinematography ===
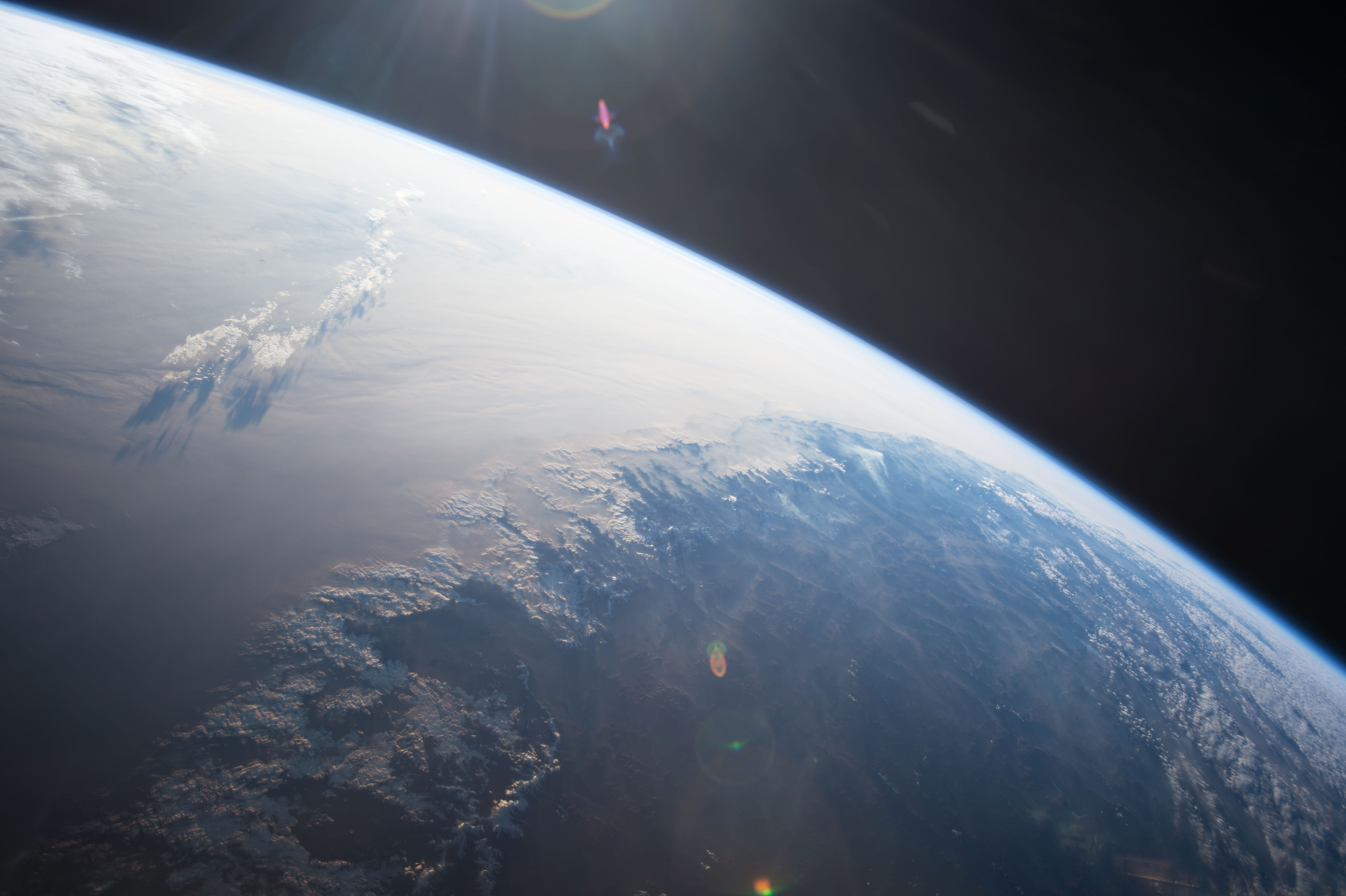
The uninterrupted 13-minute opening scene started with a clear view of brightly lit Earth similar to this NASA picture. The sequence took many months to design and years to shoot.

Cuarón wanted to do long takes, in part because the producers wanted to film it like an IMAX-style Discovery Channel documentary. However, the long takes are deceptive as 'invisible cuts' were utilised to stitch shots together during editing. As with his previous films, Emmanuel Lubezki did not use prior footage as the starting point of his work on Gravity. Instead, he carried out a search of images from NASA and Roscosmos. He and his team put together a large collection of photographs and picked what was best for the film. Lubezki said that they based the visuals on descriptions from astronauts, with some artistic license in depicting how the stars looked during the daytime in space. He wanted to incorporate the stars as much as possible to feel as deep as possible and avoid plain darkness and two dimensional feeling.

The 13-minute opening scene was challenging for the team to shoot. Cuarón asked Lubezki to start the film with a brightly lit Earth, adding shadows and dusk as the threat grows stronger. The light was constantly changing from one frame to the other with the actors spinning around the shuttle, the shuttle itself spinning, and the Earth spinning as well as orbiting around the Sun all simultaneously. It took many months to design it and years to shoot it. When the team designed the sequence, Lubezki had in mind one of his "favorite cinematographers, Vittorio Storaro, and how he used lighting changes in his movies".

=== Visual effects ===
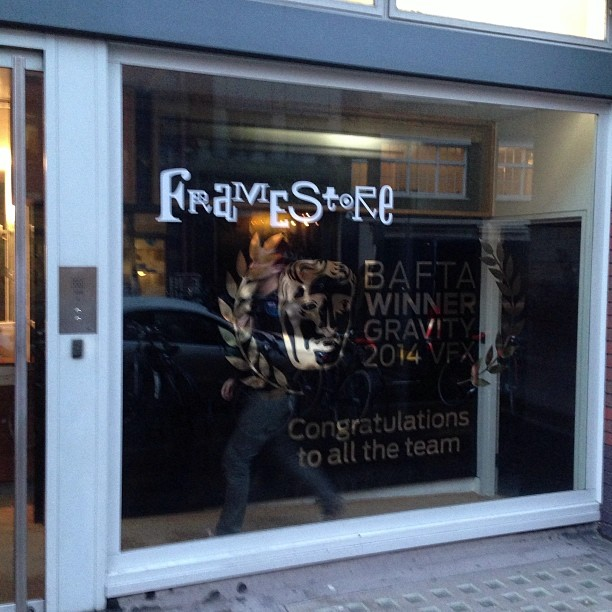
Framestore office exterior in London, March 2014, after Gravity BAFTA wins

Visual effects were supervised by Tim Webber at the British VFX company Framestore, which was responsible for creating most of the film's visual effects—except for 17 shots. Framestore was also heavily involved in the art direction and, along with The Third Floor, the previsualization. Tim Webber stated that 80 percent of the film consisted of CGI—compared to James Cameron's Avatar (2009), which was 60 percent CGI. To simulate the authenticity and reflection of unfiltered light in space, a manually controlled lighting system consisting of 1.8 million individually controlled LED lights was built. The 3D imagery was designed and supervised by Chris Parks. The majority of the 3D was created by stereo rendering the CGI at Framestore. The remaining footage was converted into 3D in post-production—principally at Prime Focus, London, with additional conversion work by Framestore.

== Music ==
Steven Price composed the incidental music for Gravity. In early September 2013, a 23-minute preview of the soundtrack was released online. A soundtrack album was released digitally on September 17, 2013, and in physical formats on October 1, 2013, by WaterTower Music. Songs featured in the film include:

- "Angels Are Hard to Find" by Hank Williams Jr.
- "Mera Joota Hai Japani" by Shailendra and Shankar Jaikishan
- "Sinigit Meerannguaq" by Juaaka Lyberth
- "Destination Anywhere" by Chris Benstead and Robin Baynton
- "922 Anthem" by Djay Adx and Gaurav Dayal
- "Ready" by Charles Scott (featuring Chelsea Williams)

In most of the film's official trailers, Spiegel im Spiegel, written by Estonian composer Arvo Pärt in 1978, was used.

== Release ==
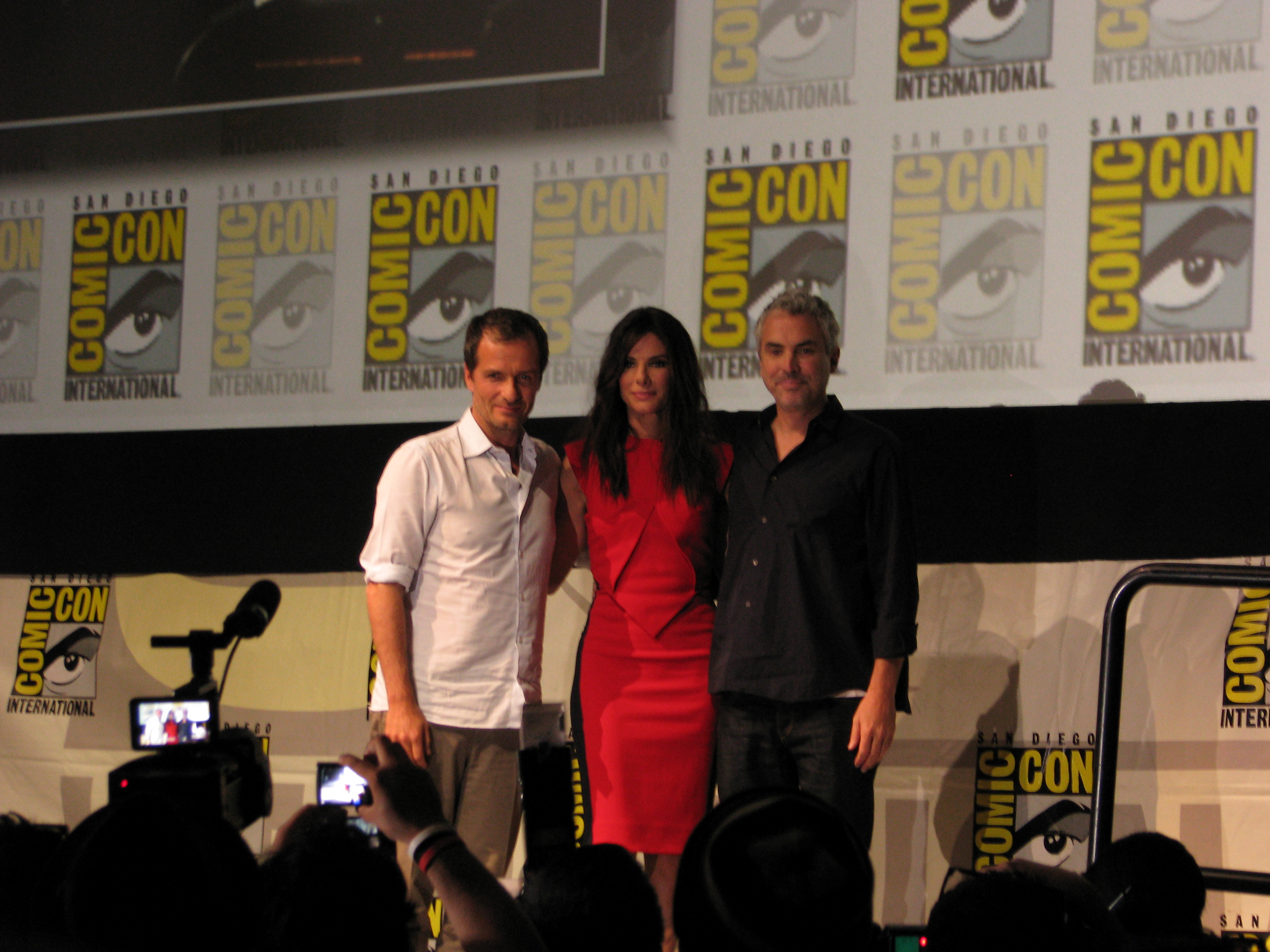
David Heyman, Sandra Bullock, and Alfonso Cuarón at the 2013 San Diego Comic-Con promoting Gravity

Gravity had its world premiere at the 70th Venice International Film Festival on August 28, 2013, and had its North American premiere three days later at the Telluride Film Festival. It was released in the US on October 4, 2013, and in the UK on November 1, 2013. The film's US release coincided with the beginning of World Space Week, which was observed from October 4 to 10. The film was originally scheduled to be released in the US on November 21, 2012, before being rescheduled for a 2013 release to allow the completion of extensive post-production work.

=== Home media ===
Gravity was released on digital download on February 11, 2014, and was released on DVD, Blu-ray and Blu-ray 3D on February 25, 2014, in the United States and on March 3, 2014, in the United Kingdom. As of March 16, 2014, Gravity has sold 908,756 DVDs along with 957,355 Blu-ray discs for $16,465,600 and $22,183,843, respectively, for a total of $38,649,443. Gravity was also offered for free in HD on Google Play and Nexus devices from late October 2014 to early November 2014.

A "special edition" Blu-ray was released on March 31, 2015. The release includes a "Silent Space Version" of the film which omits the score composed by Steven Price. Another standard Blu-ray was later released in 2024, which also includes the Silent Space Version and adds Dolby Atmos as an audio option.

== Reception ==
=== Box office ===
Gravity emerged as one of the most successful sci-fi films of all time, and the biggest box office hit of both Sandra Bullock and George Clooney's careers. It became the highest-grossing feature film in October history, surpassing the animated Puss in Boots and holding the record until 2019's Joker. Bullock's previous highest-grossing film was Speed ($350.2 million) while Clooney's benchmark was Ocean's Eleven ($450.6 million).

Preliminary reports predicted the film would open with around $40 million in the US and Canada. The film earned $1.4 million from its Thursday night showings, and reached $17.5 million on Friday. Gravity topped the box office and broke the record held by Paranormal Activity 3 (2011) as the highest-earning October and autumn openings, grossing $55.8 million from 3,575 theaters. The film also surpassed Batman & Robin (1997) for having Clooney's highest opening weekend and The Heat for having Bullock's highest opening weekend respectively. 80 percent of the film's opening weekend gross came from its 3D showings, which grossed $44.2 million from 3,150 theaters. $11.2 million—20 percent of the receipts—came from IMAX 3D showings, the highest percentage for a film opening of more than $50 million. The film stayed at number one at the box office during its second and third weekends. IMAX alone generated $34.7 million from 323 theaters, a record for IMAX opening in October.

Gravity earned $27.4 million in its opening weekend overseas from 27 countries with $2.8 million from roughly 4,763 screens. Warner Bros. said the 3D showing "exceeded all expectations" and generated 70 percent of the opening grosses. In China, its second largest market, the film opened on November 19, 2013, and faced competition with The Hunger Games: Catching Fire which opened on November 21, 2013. At the end of the weekend Gravity emerged victorious, generating $35.76 million in six days. It opened at number one in the United Kingdom, taking £6.23 million over the first weekend of release, and remained there for the second week. The film's high notable openings were in Russia and the CIS ($8.1 million), Germany ($3.8 million), Australia ($3.2 million), Italy ($2.6 million) and Spain ($2.3 million). The film's largest markets outside North America were China ($71.2 million), the United Kingdom ($47 million) and France ($38.2 million). By February 17, 2014, the film had grossed $700 million worldwide. Gravity grossed $274,092,705 in North America and $449,100,000 in other countries, making a worldwide gross of $723,192,705—making it the eighth-highest-grossing film of 2013. Calculating in all expenses, Deadline Hollywood estimated that the film made a profit of $209.2 million.

According to the tracking site Excipio, Gravity was one of the most copyright-infringed films of 2014 with over 29.3 million downloads via torrent sites.

=== Critical response ===
Cuarón shows things that cannot be but, miraculously, are, in the fearful, beautiful reality of the space world above our world. If the film past is dead, Gravity shows us the glory of cinema's future. It thrills on so many levels. And because Cuarón is a movie visionary of the highest order, you truly can't beat the view.

— Richard Corliss of Time

On review aggregator Rotten Tomatoes, the film has an approval rating of 96% based on 362 reviews, with an average rating of 9.0/10. The website's critical consensus states: "Alfonso Cuarón's Gravity is an eerie, tense sci-fi thriller that's masterfully directed and visually stunning." On Metacritic, which assigns a normalized rating out based on reviews, the film has a weighted average score of 96 out of 100, based on 49 critics, indicating "universal acclaim", and making it the second-highest scoring widely released film of its year. In CinemaScore polls conducted during the opening weekend, cinema audiences gave Gravity an average grade of "A−" on an A+ to F scale. CinemaScore later issued an apology for the grade, saying they should have limited the poll to 3D showings instead of both 2D and 3D screenings (The Hollywood Reporter said it was "playing like an A+ film").

Matt Zoller Seitz, writing on RogerEbert.com, gave the film four out of four stars, calling it "a huge and technically dazzling film and that the film's panoramas of astronauts tumbling against starfields and floating through space station interiors are at once informative and lovely". Justin Chang, writing for Variety, said that the film "restores a sense of wonder, terror and possibility to the big screen that should inspire awe among critics and audiences worldwide". Richard Corliss of Time praised Cuarón for playing "daringly and dexterously with point-of-view: at one moment you're inside Ryan's helmet as she surveys the bleak silence, then in a subtle shift you're outside to gauge her reaction. The 3-D effects, added in post-production, provide their own extraterrestrial startle: a hailstorm of debris hurtles at you, as do a space traveler's thoughts at the realization of being truly alone in the universe."

Peter Bradshaw of The Guardian gave the film five out of five stars, writing "a brilliant and inspired movie-cyclorama ... a glorious imaginary creation that engulfs you utterly." Robbie Collin of The Daily Telegraph also awarded the film five out of five stars.

Peter Travers of Rolling Stone gave the film four out of four stars, stating that the film was "more than a movie. It's some kind of miracle." A. O. Scott, writing for The New York Times, highlighted the use of 3-D which he said, "surpasses even what James Cameron accomplished in the flight sequences of Avatar". Scott also said that the film "in a little more than 90 minutes rewrites the rules of cinema as we have known them". Quentin Tarantino said it was one of his top ten films of 2013. Empire, Time and Total Film ranked the film as the best of 2013.

Critics have compared Gravity with other notable films set in space. Lindsey Weber of Vulture.com said the choice of Ed Harris for the voice of Mission Control is a reference to Apollo 13. Todd McCarthy of The Hollywood Reporter suggests the way "a weightless Stone goes floating about in nothing but her underwear" references Alien (1979). Other critics made connections with 2001: A Space Odyssey (1968). James Cameron praised the film and stated, "I think it's the best space photography ever done, I think it's the best space film ever done, and it's the movie I've been hungry to see for an awful long time". Empire Online, AskMen and The Huffington Post also considered Gravity to be one of the best space films ever made. While The Huffington Post's Lauren Duca later included Gravity on the site's list of "8 Movies from the Last 15 Years That Are Super Overrated", another of the site's film critics, Christopher Rosen, placed it at the top of his list of Best Movies of 2013. Gravity was included on the top ten lists of 93 critics and topped the list of 22 of them.

=== Accolades ===
Gravity received a leading 10 nominations at the 86th Academy Awards (with American Hustle), including Best Picture, Best Actress for Bullock, and Best Production Design. The film won a leading seven Academy Awards: for Best Director, Best Cinematography, Best Visual Effects, Best Film Editing, Best Original Score, Best Sound Editing, and Best Sound Mixing. Its seven wins makes it the most Oscar-awarded film of the 2010s decade, and is second only to Cabaret (1972) in receiving the most Academy Awards in the ceremony despite not winning Best Picture.

Cuarón won the Golden Globe Award for Best Director, and the film was also nominated for Best Motion Picture – Drama, Best Actress – Drama for Bullock and Best Original Score.

Gravity received a leading 11 nominations at the 67th British Academy Film Awards, including Best Film, Best Original Screenplay, and Best Actress in a Leading Role. Cuarón was the most-nominated person at the awards; he was nominated for five awards, including his nominations as producer for Best Film awards and editor. Despite not winning Best Film, Gravity won a leading 6 awards, including Outstanding British Film, Best Director, Best Original Music, Best Cinematography, Best Sound, and Best Visual Effects.

Gravity also won the 2014 Hugo Award for Best Dramatic Presentation.

The February 2020 issue of New York Magazine lists Gravity as among "The Best Movies That Lost Best Picture at the Oscars."

In June 2025, it ranked number 97 on The New York Times' list of "The 100 Best Movies of the 21st Century" and was one of the films voted for the "Readers' Choice" edition of the list, finishing at number 219.

== Scientific accuracy ==
Cuarón has stated that Gravity is not always scientifically accurate and that some liberties were needed to sustain the story. Despite this, the film has been praised for the realism of its premises and its overall adherence to physical principles, although several inaccuracies and exaggerations were still noted. According to the NASA Astronaut Michael J. Massimino, who took part in Hubble Space Telescope Servicing Missions STS-109 and STS-125, "nothing was out of place, nothing was missing. There was a one-of-a-kind wirecutter we used on one of my spacewalks and sure enough they had that wirecutter in the movie."

The astronaut Buzz Aldrin called the visual effects "remarkable" and he hoped that the film would stimulate the public to find an interest in space again, after decades' diminishing investments into advancements in the field:

I was so extravagantly impressed by the portrayal of the reality of zero gravity. Going through the space station was done just the way that I've seen people do it in reality. The spinning is going to happen—maybe not quite that vigorous—but certainly we've been fortunate that people haven't been in those situations yet. I think it reminds us that there really are hazards in the space business, especially in activities outside the spacecraft.

The former NASA astronaut Garrett Reisman said:

The pace and story was definitely engaging and I think it was the best use of the 3-D IMAX medium to date. Rather than using the medium as a gimmick, Gravity uses it to depict a real environment that is completely alien to most people. But the question that most people want me to answer is, how realistic was it? The very fact that the question is being asked so earnestly is a testament to the verisimilitude of the movie. When a bad science fiction movie comes out, no one bothers to ask me if it reminded me of the real thing.

The former astronaut Chris Hadfield was critical of Gravity's portrayal of astronauts, particularly its depiction of Bullock's character, saying "When she's faced with a problem, she's panicking and has no idea what to do. George Clooney is driving around like some sort of space cowboy and he's the only one who has any idea what's going on. I think it set back a little girl's vision of what a woman astronaut can be an entire generation." In contrast, Vanessa Reich-Shackelford, of Westcoast Women in Engineering, Science and Technology, wrote of the character of Dr. Ryan Stone: "I came to realize that writers Alfonso (also director) and Jonás Cuarón had created one of the most positive representations of a woman in STEM on screen so far."

=== Technical observations ===
A diagram showing the orbits of the International Space Station and Hubble Space Telescope

The astrophysicist Neil deGrasse Tyson, the astronomer and skeptic Phil Plait, and the veteran NASA astronaut and spacewalker Scott E. Parazynski have offered comments about some of the most "glaring" inaccuracies. The Dissolve characterized these complaints as "absurd," problems "only an astrophysicist would find."

In the movie, an impact in one orbital plane is shown to affect characters present at a different orbital plane. Also, these characters are depicted as being able to travel to a third orbital plane relatively easily. In reality, the debris field created by a destroyed communications satellite would likely not affect the Hubble Space Telescope, which is where the shuttle Explorer is at the beginning of the film. Likewise, the significant differences between orbital parameters of the Hubble Space Telescope and the International Space Station would have made it impossible to travel between the two spacecraft, as the astronauts do using only Kowalski's MMU, without precise preparation, planning, calculation, the appropriate technology, and a large quantity of fuel on hand. (Note: The Hubble Space Telescope previously had an altitude of about 559 kilometres (347 mi) and an orbital inclination of 28.5 degrees. As of the release of the film, the International Space Station had an altitude of around 420 kilometres (260 mi) and an orbital inclination of 51.65 degrees. Communications satellites are in much higher orbits than either.)

Further examples of differences from reality include:

- Several observers (including Plait and Tyson) said that in the scene in which Kowalski unclips his tether and floats away to his death to save Stone from being pulled away from the ISS, Stone would simply need to tug the tether gently to pull Kowalski toward her. According to the film's science adviser Kevin Grazier and Robert Frost, a NASA engineer, however, the pair are still decelerating with Stone's leg caught in the parachute cords from the Soyuz. The cords stretch as they absorb her kinetic energy. Kowalski thinks that the cords are not strong enough to absorb his kinetic energy as well as hers, and that he must release the tether to give Stone a chance of stopping before the cords fail and doom both of them. This argument can be rebutted by the fact that a zero rotation state is highly improbable in free space without active rotation arrest; thus, the Stone-Kowalski system is inevitably rotating around the ISS exerting a centrifugal force and tension on the tether; the tension can be substantial even with a slow rate of rotation due to the overall length of parachute cords and the tether.
- By the time Tiangong-1 was launched in 2011, the Space Shuttle had been retired from service.
- Stone is shown not wearing liquid-cooled ventilation garments or even socks, which are always worn under the EVA suit to protect against extreme temperatures in space. Neither was she shown wearing space diapers. Stone can open her spacesuit, unlike a real one, in the front, by herself.
- Stone's tears first roll down her face in micro-gravity, and are later seen floating off her face. In reality, after being pushed from the eye by the eyelid, tears have insufficient surface tension to continue clinging to the jawline. However, the film correctly portrays the spherical nature of drops of liquid in a micro-gravity environment.
- Kowalski's use of the MMU as his personal jet pack while zipping around in a spacewalk was criticized by Time's Jeffery Kluger as being unrealistic. NASA's spacewalks are strictly choreographed in advance.

Despite the inaccuracies in Gravity, Tyson, Plait, and Parazynski all said they enjoyed watching the film. Astronaut Cady Coleman advised Sandra Bullock on the film.

== See also ==
- Kessler syndrome
- List of films featuring space stations
- Survival film
- 2013 in film
- List of American films of 2013
- List of British films of 2013
