= Love in the Time of Hysteria =

- Film poster
- Spanish: Sólo con tu pareja
- Directed by: Alfonso Cuarón
- Written by: Carlos Cuarón; Alfonso Cuarón
- Produced by: Alfonso Cuarón
- Starring: Daniel Giménez Cacho; Claudia Ramírez
- Cinematography: Emmanuel Lubezki
- Edited by: Alfonso Cuarón; Luis Patlán
- Music by: Carlos Warman
- Distributed by: Warner Bros.
- Release date: December 25, 1991
- Running time: 94 minutes
- Country: Mexico
- Language: Spanish

Love in the Time of Hysteria (Spanish: Sólo con tu pareja, lit. '"Only with your partner"') is a 1991 Mexican romantic comedy film produced, co-written and directed by Alfonso Cuarón, in his feature-length directorial debut. It stars Daniel Giménez Cacho and Claudia Ramírez.

After Alfonso Cuarón and his brother Carlos Cuarón wrote the script, they needed to secure financing. The Mexican government's IMCINE (Instituto Mexicano de Cinematografía) had already decided what films they would finance that year. However, one of the projects was canceled and the IMCINE funds were assigned to Sólo con tu pareja.

After the film was completed, the government refused to distribute it, but Sólo con tu pareja was presented at several international festivals. It won awards at the Ariel Awards (by the Mexican Academy of Film) and at the Toronto Festival of Festivals. After this international recognition the movie was finally shown in 1993 in its country of origin, where it became a box-office success. It occupies the 87th place on the list of the 100 best movies of the cinema of Mexico.

== Plot ==
Tomás Tomás, a womanizing bachelor who works in advertising, is having an affair with his boss Gloria. After visiting his doctor Mateo, who is also his friend and neighbor, he is struck by the new nurse Silvia and starts an affair with her too. When she finds out about Gloria, she falsifies the results of his blood test, notifying him that he has AIDS. He meanwhile has been struck by his neighbour Clarisa, a flight attendant engaged to a pilot Carlos, but realizes he cannot pursue her now.

In despair at his fate, he decides to commit suicide. While contemplating various methods, Clarisa bursts in in despair. She has found Carlos in bed with another woman and wants to end her life, so the two decide to go to the Torre Latinoamericana and jump from the top. Tomás leaves a voice message for Mateo and in the middle of the night the pair set off. When Mateo gets the message among friends at a party, he rushes to the Torre with the whole group, including his wife Teresa, Carlos, and Silvia.

At the top, Tomás tells Clarisa he loves her but can go no further because he has AIDS. She says, since they are both about to die, that does not now matter and the two make ecstatic love. Climbing the emergency stairs, Silvia calls out that the blood test was not positive. Instead of jumping, the lovers think about marrying.

== Cast ==
- Daniel Giménez Cacho as Tomás Tomás
- Claudia Ramírez as Clarisa Negrete
- Luis de Icaza as doctor Mateo Mateos
- Dobrina Liubomirova as Silvia Silva
- Astrid Hadad as Teresa de Teresa
- Isabel Benet as Gloria Gold
- Toshirô Hisaki as Takeshi
- Carlos Nakasone as Koyi
- Ricardo Dalmacci as Carlos
- Claudia Fernández as Lucía
- Luz María Jerez as Paola
- Nevil Wilton as Pasmal
- John Keys as Absolut Boozer
- Raúl Valerio as guard at the Torre Latinoamericana
- Montserrat Ontiveros as Mrs. Panza
- Regina Orozco as Mrs. Dolores
- Rodolfo Arias as Hernán Cortés on the commercial for "Jalapeños Caseros Gómez"
- Víctor Carpinteiro as Montezuma on the commercial for "Jalapeños Caseros Gómez"
- Claudette Maillé as la Burbus
- Ariel López Padilla as Burbus' boyfriend
- Marcos Mohar as boy at the elevator
- Jiussana Briseño as Nancy of Continental Airlines
- Arturo Ríos as contratenor in a dream about the Mexicana de Aviación plane
- Adriana Olivera as voice of the beeper operator
- Jonás Cuarón as Kid at Wedding

== Home video ==
In 2006, Criterion Collection released Sólo con tu pareja in DVD (Region 1), with a new remastered transfer and with the shorts Noche de Bodas by Carlos Cuarón and Cuarteto Para el Fin Del Tiempo (Alfonso Cuarón's first short, made when he was a film student in 1983).

== Accolades ==
Ariel Award in 1992

- Best Original Story - Alfonso Cuarón & Carlos Cuarón

Also nominated for:

- Best Cinematography - Emmanuel Lubezki
- Best First Feature Film - Alfonso Cuarón
- Best Screenplay - Alfonso Cuarón & Carlos Cuarón
