= Carlos Cuarón =

Mexican film director

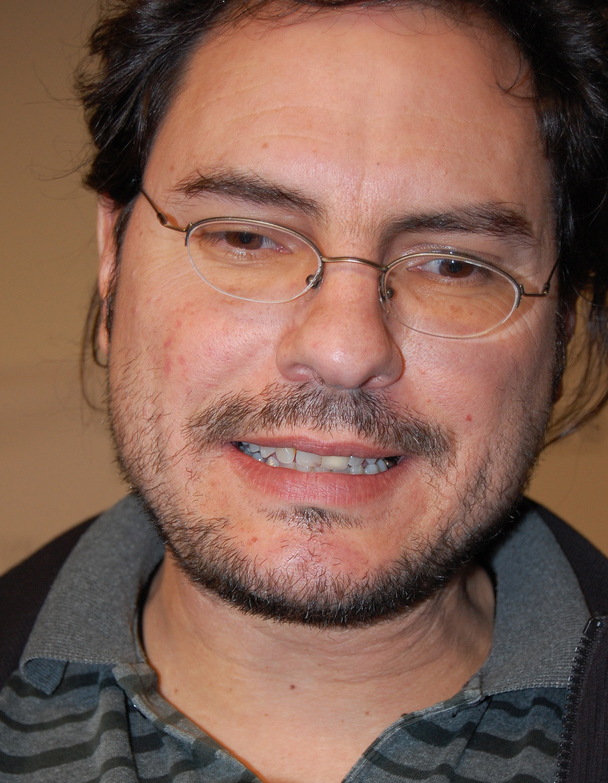
Cuarón in March 2009

Carlos José Cuarón Orozco (born 2 October 1966) is a Mexican screenwriter, film producer, and film director. He is also brother of the Academy Award-winner Alfonso Cuarón Orozco.

== Biography ==
Carlos Cuarón was born in Mexico City and studied English literature at UNAM. He wrote the screenplay for Sólo con tu pareja in 1991 which was directed by his brother, Alfonso and won the Ariel Award for best original screenplay the same year. Along with his brother, he wrote the screenplay for Y tu mamá también (starring Gael García Bernal, Diego Luna and Maribel Verdú) and received the Silver Lion for best original screenplay in the 2001 edition of Venice International Film Festival. They were nominated to the BAFTA awards as well as the Academy Award in the same category. In December 2008, Rudo y Cursi (Rude and Corny) his first movie as a director was released. It also stars Diego Luna and Gael García Bernal.

== Filmography ==
- Sólo con tu pareja (1991) writer
- Who the Hell is Juliette? (1997) writer
- Y Tu Mamá También (2001) writer
- El misterio del Trinidad (2003) writer
- Rudo y Cursi (2008) writer, director
- The Second Bakery Attack (2010) writer, director
- Sugar Kisses (2013) writer, director
- Desierto (2015) producer
