= Desierto =

2015 film

- Theatrical release poster
- Directed by: Jonás Cuarón
- Written by: Jonás Cuarón; Mateo Garcia
- Produced by: Alfonso Cuarón; Carlos Cuarón; Jonás Cuarón; Alex Garcia; Charles Gillibert
- Starring: Gael García Bernal; Jeffrey Dean Morgan; Alondra Hidalgo; Diego Cataño
- Cinematography: Damian Garcia
- Edited by: Jonás Cuarón
- Music by: Woodkid
- Production companies: Esperanto Kino; CG Cinema; Orange Studio; Itaca Films; Lava Bear Films; IM Global
- Distributed by: Cinépolis Distribución (Colombia and Mexico); Version Originale/Condor; Orange Studio (France)
- Release dates: 13 September 2015 (TIFF); 15 April 2016 (Mexico)
- Running time: 88 minutes
- Countries: Mexico; France
- Languages: English; Spanish
- Budget: $3 million
- Box office: $4.9 million

Desierto is a 2015 thriller film co-written and directed by Jonás Cuarón. It was produced by Cuarón together with his father Alfonso and his uncle Carlos, and distributed by STXfilms. The film stars Gael García Bernal (also executive producer) and Jeffrey Dean Morgan. It was shown in the Special Presentations section of the 2015 Toronto International Film Festival, where it won the Prize of the International Federation of Film Critics (FIPRESCI) for Special Presentations, and was selected as the Mexican entry for the Best Foreign Language Film at the 89th Academy Awards but it was not nominated.

== Plot ==
A group of Mexican migrant workers seek a better life by crossing the US border illegally; when the truck carrying them breaks down in the middle of nowhere, the driver points the migrants and his partner Mechas in the direction of the United States and wishes them luck. Moises is also a member of the migrants and follows as the group splits in two while trying to pass the border.

Sam is a merciless, rifle-toting vigilante who, with his faithful but vicious Malinois dog, Tracker, hunts for rabbits near the border and notices the group trespassing; with the help of Tracker and the use of his M1 Garand rifle, Sam kills most of the group, including Mechas and leaves Moises and Adela (Alondra Hidalgo) as the sole survivors after a long chase. Unable to follow the last two, Sam decides to continue his hunt the next day and leaves with Tracker.

Adela and Moises find a spot to rest, with Adela confessing to Moises that her companion, who was one Sam's victims, was sent by her parents to protect her and even though he molested her during their journey, he didn't deserve to die that way. Moises confesses to Adela that he had already been to the US and that he has a family waiting for him in Oakland, showing a talking teddy bear which his son gave to him before being deported, and that Moises promised him he would bring it back. Meanwhile, Sam rests by a campfire with Tracker, describing to his loyal dog how he used to love the desert but now the heat is playing with his mind and he wants to escape from it.

The next morning Adela and Moises steal Sam's truck, using the teddy bear to distract Sam and Tracker. The duo manage to start the truck and seem to have finally escaped when Sam shoots Adela in the arm, causing Moises to crash the truck which further injured Adela. They continue on foot, followed by Sam and Tracker. Moises stops to take care of Adela's wound, then tells her he has to leave her and takes Sam's jacket and flare gun with him. Moises has a change of heart and uses a round of the flare gun to distract Sam from Adela; Tracker closely pursues Moises in a cactus field where Moises is forced to use the flare gun on Tracker and shoot him in the mouth before escaping; Sam finds a mortally wounded Tracker and reluctantly shoots him to end his suffering before swearing vengeance on Moises.

After a long time chasing Moises as they are climbing on a rock structure, Sam is dehydrated and tired; Moises hides between the rocks and pushes Sam as he is standing on the edge, causing both of them to fall and breaking Sam's leg in the process. Both try to reach the rifle, but Moises takes it and menaces Sam with the rifle for murdering so many people and trying to kill Moises and Adela as Sam begs for his life, for forgiveness, and for water. Instead, Moises leaves with the rifle, telling Sam that the desert will kill him and leaves Sam to die despite his pleas for Moises to come back.

Moises returns for Adela; he finds her alive, but unconscious, and carries her until they cross a salt lake.

== Cast ==
- Gael García Bernal as Moises
- Jeffrey Dean Morgan as Sam
- Alondra Hidalgo as Adela
- Diego Cataño as Mechas
- Marco Pérez as Lobo
- Oscar Flores as Ramiro
- David Lorenzo as Ulises
- Butch McCain as Radio Talker
- Lew Temple as a Border Patrol officer

== Release ==
The film was first released at the Toronto International Film Festival in September 2015. In December 2015, STX Entertainment announced that it would release the film in North American theaters the following March. The film was released in France and Mexico in April 2016 and had grossed $2.8 million as of 15 May 2016. The North American release was delayed until 14 October 2016.

== Reception ==
=== Critical response ===
The film holds a 63% approval rating on Rotten Tomatoes, based on 93 reviews with an average rating of 5.7/10. The site's consensus reads "Desierto's thought-provoking themes and refreshing perspective are unfortunately offset by a predictable plot and thinly written characters." On Metacritic, the film has a score of 51 out of 100, based on 24 critics, indicating "mixed or average reviews".

Dave Robinson of outlet Crash Landed reviewed the home entertainment release of Desierto awarding it 3 stars, taking note of its technical acumen in providing a thriller, but its "ill-defined script accomplishing nothing beyond passive entertainment" and of special note its complete lack of special features.

=== Accolades ===
| Award | Date of ceremony | Category | Recipient(s) | Result | Ref. |
|---|---|---|---|---|---|
| Academy Award | 26 February 2017 | Best Foreign Language Film | Desierto | Not nominated | |
| Ariel Awards | 11 July 2017 | Best Picture | Esperanto Kino, Ítaca Films, Orange Studio, CG Cinema | Nominated | |
| Ariel Awards | 11 July 2017 | Best Director | Jonás Cuarón | Nominated | |
| Ariel Awards | 11 July 2017 | Best Supporting Actor | Diego Cataño | Nominated | |
| Ariel Awards | 11 July 2017 | Best Original Screenplay | Jonás Cuarón and Mateo García | Nominated | |
| Ariel Awards | 11 July 2017 | Best Cinematography | Damián García | Nominated | |
| Ariel Awards | 11 July 2017 | Best Film Editing | Jonás Cuarón | Nominated | |
| Ariel Awards | 11 July 2017 | Best Visual Effects | Anthony Lestramau | Nominated | |
| Ariel Awards | 11 July 2017 | Best Special Effects | José Manuel Martínez | Nominated | |
| Ariel Awards | 11 July 2017 | Best Original Score | Yoann Lemoine | Nominated | |
| BFI London Film Festival | 7–18 October 2015 | Best Film | Desierto | Nominated | |
| Fénix Awards | 7 December 2016 | Best Sound | Sergio Díaz, Vincent Arnardi and Raúl Locatelli | Nominated | |
| Havana Film Festival | 16 December 2016 | Best Fiction Film | Desierto | Won | |
| Havana Film Festival | 16 December 2016 | Best Original Music | Yoann Lemoine | Won | |
| Phoenix Film Critics Society | 20 December 2016 | Best Foreign Language Film | Desierto | Nominated | |
| Platino Awards | 22 July 2017 | Best Editing | Sergio Díaz | Nominated | |
| Toronto International Film Festival | 10–20 September 2015 | FIPRESCI Special Presentations | Jonás Cuarón | Won | |

== See also ==
- List of submissions to the 89th Academy Awards for Best Foreign Language Film
- List of Mexican submissions for the Academy Award for Best Foreign Language Film
