= Year of the Nail =

2007 film by Jonás Cuarón

Year of the Nail (Año uña)
- British DVD cover
- Directed by: Jonás Cuarón
- Written by: Jonás Cuarón
- Produced by: Jonás Cuarón; Eireann Harper; Frida Torresblanco
- Starring: Eireann Harper; Diego Cataño
- Cinematography: Jonás Cuarón
- Edited by: Jonás Cuarón; Eireann Harper
- Production company: Esperanto Filmoj
- Distributed by: Canana Films
- Release date: 2007
- Running time: 79 minutes
- Country: Mexico
- Languages: Spanish; English

Year of the Nail (Spanish: Año uña) is a 2007 Mexican film written and directed by Jonás Cuarón. The film is told entirely through still photographs that the director took of his real life over the course of a year.

== Plot ==
American college student Molly is in Mexico to study Spanish. She wants to take advantage of the trip by visiting old ruins and focusing on her photography during her free time, but she ends up tagging along with the other students who are only interested in partying.

Meanwhile, Diego, a teenage Mexican boy, falls in love with his cousin. He hurts his toenail one day during a soccer game while trying to impress her.

Molly returns to Mexico during her next break from school in order to photograph the ruins that she missed seeing on her previous trip. She rents a room from Diego's mother, who is renting it out in order to raise money for an operation for Diego's grandfather. Diego and Molly end up spending time together. Diego falls in love with Molly and the two develop a bond, going to the beach together near his grandmother's ranch, but he never tells her his true feelings.

After Molly leaves, Diego secretly buys an airplane ticket to New York City to visit her. He lies to his parents, saying that he is going camping with friends for the weekend. When he arrives in New York he calls Molly and says that he is there accompanying his father on a business trip. She takes him to Coney Island and the two spend the day together.

Before he goes home to Mexico, Diego reveals to Molly that he was not really there with his father and that he had come to see her. She says that he is sweet but too young for her. After he leaves, she changes her phone number so that he will be unable to contact her and able to move on with his life more easily. Months later, Molly returns to Mexico for a third time, still having never seen the ruins. She goes there alone but forgets to bring her camera.

She considers contacting Diego and letting him know that she is there, but decides not to, realizing that he has probably moved on with his life and forgotten all about her. The film closes with Diego chatting with one of his cousins about girls. He has a new love interest and makes no mention of Molly.

== Production ==
Jonás Cuarón was introduced to Chris Marker's film La Jetée, which famously consists almost exclusively of still photographs, by his then-girlfriend Eireann Harper. He was inspired to create a film in such a way and set out to do so. He began documenting everyday events in his life through photography, taking pictures of his friends and family, with the intention of putting them together after a year and making a story out of them. It was only after he had all his photographs that he began writing the story, first collecting the photos into different scenes and then writing the dialogue.

== Cast ==
- Eireann Harper as Molly
- Diego Cataño as Diego
- Mariana Elizondo as Mom
- Emilia Garcia as Emilia

== See also ==
- Still image film
