= List of awards and nominations received by Emmanuel Lubezki =

Emmanuel Lubezki awards and nominations
Awards and nominations
| Award | Wins | Nominations |
| Academy Awards | 3 | 8 |
| Alliance of Women Film Journalists | 3 | 4 |
| American Society of Cinematographers | 5 | 6 |
| Ariel Awards | 3 | 4 |
| Austin Film Critics Association | 5 | 6 |
| Australian Cinematographers Society | 2 | 2 |
| Boston Society of Film Critics | 5 | 5 |
| British Academy Film Awards | 4 | 4 |
| British Society of Cinematographers | 0 | 5 |
| CableACE Awards | 1 | 1 |
| Camerimage | 1 | 3 |
| Chicago Film Critics Association | 4 | 8 |
| Chlotrudis Society for Independent Film | 0 | 4 |
| Critics' Choice Movie Awards | 4 | 4 |
| Dallas–Fort Worth Film Critics Association | 6 | 6 |
| Dublin Film Critics' Circle | 2 | 2 |
| Florida Film Critics Circle | 2 | 3 |
| Georgia Film Critics Association | 3 | 5 |
| Hollywood Film Awards | 2 | 2 |
| Houston Film Critics Society | 4 | 4 |
| Independent Spirit Awards | 1 | 1 |
| IndieWire Critics Poll | 5 | 5 |
| London Film Critics' Circle | 0 | 1 |
| Los Angeles Film Critics Association | 4 | 4 |
| National Society of Film Critics | 2 | 5 |
| New York Film Critics Circle | 4 | 4 |
| New York Film Critics Online | 3 | 3 |
| Online Film Critics Society | 4 | 7 |
| San Diego Film Critics Society | 4 | 5 |
| San Francisco Bay Area Film Critics Circle | 2 | 4 |
| Satellite Awards | 1 | 6 |
| Sitges Film Festival | 1 | 1 |
| St. Louis Film Critics Association | 3 | 4 |
| Tokyo International Film Festival | 1 | 1 |
| Venice Film Festival | 1 | 1 |
| Visual Effects Society | 1 | 1 |
| Washington D.C. Area Film Critics Association | 4 | 4 |

Totals (Note: Certain award groups do not simply award one winner. They acknowledge several different recipients, have runners-up, and have third place. Since this is a specific recognition and is different from losing an award, runner-up mentions are considered wins in this award tally. For simplification and to avoid errors, each award in this list has been presumed to have had a prior nomination.)
- Wins: 109
- Nominations: 147

Mexican cinematographer Emmanuel Lubezki has won 109 awards from 147 nominations. He has won three Academy Awards, four British Academy Film Awards, and four Critics' Choice Movie Awards, among various other accolades.

Lubezki received recognition early in his career, earning two Ariel Award nominations for Best Cinematography at the 1992 ceremony for Sólo con tu pareja (his first film with director Alfonso Cuarón) and Like Water for Chocolate, winning for the latter. Lubezki won the award twice more consecutively; in 1993 for Miroslava, and in 1994 for Ámbar. Two years later, he was nominated for his first Academy Award for Best Cinematography for A Little Princess (1995), which he again shot for Cuarón, at the 68th Academy Awards. His cinematography for Tim Burton's Sleepy Hollow (1999) received significant awards attention, winning him a Satellite Award for Best Cinematography and a Boston Society of Film Critics Award for Best Cinematography and earning Lubezki his second Academy Award nomination along with six other nominations from various organizations.

The New World (2005), Lubezki's first collaboration with director Terrence Malick, marked his third Academy Award nomination and earned him five nominations and three awards. He received significant awards attention for his work on Cuarón's Children of Men (2006), being awarded nine wins and four nominations, including a fourth Academy Award nomination. In 2011, he re-teamed with Malick for The Tree of Life, which was his fifth film nominated for an Academy Award; his cinematography was awarded by 22 other award shows and organizations. He received international awards attention for his next three films; Gravity (2013), Birdman (2014), and The Revenant (2015), including three consecutive Academy Awards at the 86th, 87th, and 88th Academy Awards. As of 2023, he is the only cinematographer to achieve this.

== Awards and nominations ==
| Award/Organization | Year (Note: Indicates the year of the ceremony.) | Category | Work | Result | Ref(s) |
|---|---|---|---|---|---|
| Academy Awards | 1996 | Best Cinematography | A Little Princess | Nominated | |
| Academy Awards | 2000 | Best Cinematography | Sleepy Hollow | Nominated | |
| Academy Awards | 2006 | Best Cinematography | The New World | Nominated | |
| Academy Awards | 2007 | Best Cinematography | Children of Men | Nominated | |
| Academy Awards | 2012 | Best Cinematography | The Tree of Life | Nominated | |
| Academy Awards | 2014 | Best Cinematography | Gravity | Won | |
| Academy Awards | 2015 | Best Cinematography | Birdman | Won | |
| Academy Awards | 2016 | Best Cinematography | The Revenant | Won | |
| Alliance of Women Film Journalists | 2011 | Best Cinematography | The Tree of Life | Won | |
| Alliance of Women Film Journalists | 2013 | Best Cinematography | Gravity | Won | |
| Alliance of Women Film Journalists | 2015 | Best Cinematography | Birdman | Won | |
| Alliance of Women Film Journalists | 2016 | Best Cinematography | The Revenant | Nominated | |
| American Society of Cinematographers | 2000 | Outstanding Achievement in Theatrical Releases | Sleepy Hollow | Nominated | |
| American Society of Cinematographers | 2007 | Outstanding Achievement in Theatrical Releases | Children of Men | Won | |
| American Society of Cinematographers | 2012 | Outstanding Achievement in Theatrical Releases | The Tree of Life | Won | |
| American Society of Cinematographers | 2014 | Outstanding Achievement in Theatrical Releases | Gravity | Won | |
| American Society of Cinematographers | 2015 | Outstanding Achievement in Theatrical Releases | Birdman | Won | |
| American Society of Cinematographers | 2015 | Outstanding Achievement in Theatrical Releases | The Revenant | Won | |
| Ariel Awards | 1992 | Best Cinematography | Like Water for Chocolate | Won | |
| Ariel Awards | 1992 | Best Cinematography | Sólo con tu pareja | Nominated | |
| Ariel Awards | 1993 | Best Cinematography | Miroslava | Won | |
| Ariel Awards | 1994 | Best Cinematography | Ámbar | Won | |
| Austin Film Critics Association | 2007 | Best Cinematography | Children of Men | Won | |
| Austin Film Critics Association | 2011 | Best Cinematography | The Tree of Life | Won | |
| Austin Film Critics Association | 2013 | Best Cinematography | Gravity | Won | |
| Austin Film Critics Association | 2014 | Best Cinematography | Birdman | Won | |
| Austin Film Critics Association | 2015 | Best Cinematography | The Revenant | Nominated | |
| Australian Cinematographers Society | 2007 | International Award for Cinematography | Children of Men | Won | |
| Australian Cinematographers Society | 2012 | International Award for Cinematography | The Tree of Life | Won | |
| Boston Society of Film Critics | 1999 | Best Cinematography | Sleepy Hollow | Won | |
| Boston Society of Film Critics | 2011 | Best Cinematography | The Tree of Life | Won | |
| Boston Society of Film Critics | 2013 | Best Cinematography | Gravity | Won | |
| Boston Society of Film Critics | 2014 | Best Cinematography | Birdman | Won | |
| Boston Society of Film Critics | 2015 | Best Cinematography | The Revenant | Runner-up | |
| British Society of Cinematographers | 1999 | Best Cinematography in a Feature Film | Sleepy Hollow | Nominated | |
| British Society of Cinematographers | 2006 | Best Cinematography in a Feature Film | Children of Men | Nominated | |
| British Society of Cinematographers | 2012 | Best Cinematography in a Feature Film | The Tree of Life | Nominated | |
| British Society of Cinematographers | 2014 | Best Cinematography in a Feature Film | Gravity | Nominated | |
| British Society of Cinematographers | 2015 | Best Cinematography in a Feature Film | Birdman | Nominated | |
| British Society of Cinematographers | 2016 | Best Cinematography in a Feature Film | The Revenant | Nominated | |
| CableACE Awards | 1994 | Best Direction of Photography and/or Lighting; Direction in a Comedy or Dramatic Series | Fallen Angels (Episode: "Murder Obliquely") | Won | |
| Camerimage | 2011 | Golden Frog | The Tree of Life | Nominated | |
| Camerimage | 2013 | Best 3D Feature Film | Gravity | Won | |
| Camerimage | 2014 | Golden Frog | Birdman | Nominated | |
| Chicago Film Critics Association | 1996 | Best Cinematography | A Walk in the Clouds | Nominated | |
| Chicago Film Critics Association | 2000 | Best Cinematography | Sleepy Hollow | Nominated | |
| Chicago Film Critics Association | 2006 | Best Cinematography | Children of Men | Won | |
| Chicago Film Critics Association | 2006 | Best Cinematography | The New World | Nominated | |
| Chicago Film Critics Association | 2011 | Best Cinematography | The Tree of Life | Won | |
| Chicago Film Critics Association | 2013 | Best Cinematography | Gravity | Won | |
| Chicago Film Critics Association | 2014 | Best Cinematography | Birdman | Won (Note: Tied with Robert Yeoman for The Grand Budapest Hotel.) | |
| Chicago Film Critics Association | 2015 | Best Cinematography | The Revenant | Nominated | |
| Chlotrudis Society for Independent Film | 2000 | Best Cinematography | Sleepy Hollow | Nominated | |
| Chlotrudis Society for Independent Film | 2003 | Best Cinematography | Y tu mamá también | Nominated | |
| Chlotrudis Society for Independent Film | 2012 | Best Cinematography | The Tree of Life | Won | |
| Chlotrudis Society for Independent Film | 2015 | Best Cinematography | Birdman | Nominated | |
| Dallas-Fort Worth Film Critics Association | 2005 | Best Cinematography | The New World | Runner-up | |
| Dallas-Fort Worth Film Critics Association | 2006 | Best Cinematography | Children of Men | Runner-up | |
| Dallas-Fort Worth Film Critics Association | 2011 | Best Cinematography | The Tree of Life | Won | |
| Dallas-Fort Worth Film Critics Association | 2013 | Best Cinematography | Gravity | Won | |
| Dallas-Fort Worth Film Critics Association | 2014 | Best Cinematography | Birdman | Won | |
| Dallas-Fort Worth Film Critics Association | 2015 | Best Cinematography | The Revenant | Won | |
| Dublin Film Critics' Circle | 2013 | Best Cinematography | Gravity | Won | |
| Dublin Film Critics' Circle | 2013 | Best Cinematography | To the Wonder | Won | |
| Dublin Film Critics' Circle | 2016 | Best Cinematography | The Revenant | Runner-up | |
| Independent Spirit Awards | 2015 | Best Cinematography | Birdman | Won | |
| Florida Film Critics Circle | 2011 | Best Cinematography | The Tree of Life | Won | |
| Florida Film Critics Circle | 2013 | Best Cinematography | Gravity | Won | |
| Florida Film Critics Circle | 2015 | Best Cinematography | The Revenant | Nominated | |
| Georgia Film Critics Association | 2012 | Best Cinematography | The Tree of Life | Won | |
| Georgia Film Critics Association | 2014 | Best Cinematography | Gravity | Won | |
| Georgia Film Critics Association | 2014 | Best Cinematography | To the Wonder | Nominated | |
| Georgia Film Critics Association | 2015 | Best Cinematography | Birdman | Won | |
| Georgia Film Critics Association | 2016 | Best Cinematography | The Revenant | Nominated | |
| Hollywood Film Awards | 2011 | Hollywood Cinematography Award | The Tree of Life | Won | |
| Hollywood Film Awards | 2014 | Hollywood Cinematography Award | Birdman | Won | |
| Houston Film Critics Society | 2012 | Best Cinematography | The Tree of Life | Won | |
| Houston Film Critics Society | 2013 | Best Cinematography | Gravity | Won | |
| Houston Film Critics Society | 2015 | Best Cinematography | Birdman | Won | |
| Houston Film Critics Society | 2016 | Best Cinematography | The Revenant | Won | |
| IndieWire Critics Poll | 2006 | Best Cinematography | Children of Men | Won | |
| IndieWire Critics Poll | 2011 | Best Cinematography | The Tree of Life | Won | |
| IndieWire Critics Poll | 2013 | Best Cinematography | Gravity | Won | |
| IndieWire Critics Poll | 2014 | Best Cinematography | Birdman | Won | |
| IndieWire Critics Poll | 2016 | Best Cinematography | Knight of Cups | 8th place | |
| London Film Critics' Circle | 2015 | Technical Achievement | Birdman | Nominated | |
| Los Angeles Film Critics Association | 2006 | Best Cinematography | Children of Men | Won | |
| Los Angeles Film Critics Association | 2011 | Best Cinematography | The Tree of Life | Won | |
| Los Angeles Film Critics Association | 2013 | Best Cinematography | Gravity | Won | |
| Los Angeles Film Critics Association | 2014 | Best Cinematography | Birdman | Won | |
| National Society of Film Critics | 2000 | Best Cinematography | Sleepy Hollow | 2nd place | |
| National Society of Film Critics | 2006 | Best Cinematography | The New World | 3rd place | |
| National Society of Film Critics | 2007 | Best Cinematography | Children of Men | Won | |
| National Society of Film Critics | 2011 | Best Cinematography | The Tree of Life | Won | |
| National Society of Film Critics | 2013 | Best Cinematography | Gravity | 2nd place | |
| New York Film Critics Circle | 1999 | Best Cinematographer | Sleepy Hollow | Runner-up | |
| New York Film Critics Circle | 2005 | Best Cinematographer | The New World | Runner-up | |
| New York Film Critics Circle | 2006 | Best Cinematographer | Children of Men | Runner-up | |
| New York Film Critics Circle | 2011 | Best Cinematographer | The Tree of Life | Won | |
| New York Film Critics Online | 2011 | Best Cinematography | The Tree of Life | Won | |
| New York Film Critics Online | 2013 | Best Cinematography | Gravity | Won | |
| New York Film Critics Online | 2014 | Best Cinematography | Birdman | Won | |
| Online Film Critics Society | 1999 | Best Cinematography | Sleepy Hollow | Won | |
| Online Film Critics Society | 2005 | Best Cinematography | The New World | Nominated | |
| Online Film Critics Society | 2006 | Best Cinematography | Children of Men | Won | |
| Online Film Critics Society | 2011 | Best Cinematography | The Tree of Life | Won | |
| Online Film Critics Society | 2013 | Best Cinematography | Gravity | Won | |
| Online Film Critics Society | 2014 | Best Cinematography | Birdman | Nominated | |
| Online Film Critics Society | 2015 | Best Cinematography | The Revenant | Nominated | |
| Royal Photographic Society | 2016 | Lumière Award | — | Won | |
| San Diego Film Critics Society | 2005 | Best Cinematography | The New World | Won | |
| San Diego Film Critics Society | 2011 | Best Cinematography | The Tree of Life | Won | |
| San Diego Film Critics Society | 2013 | Best Cinematography | To the Wonder | Won | |
| San Diego Film Critics Society | 2013 | Best Cinematography | Gravity | Nominated | |
| San Diego Film Critics Society | 2015 | Best Cinematography | The Revenant | Nominated | |
| San Francisco Bay Area Film Critics Circle | 2011 | Best Cinematography | The Tree of Life | Won | |
| San Francisco Bay Area Film Critics Circle | 2013 | Best Cinematography | Gravity | Won | |
| San Francisco Bay Area Film Critics Circle | 2014 | Best Cinematography | Birdman | Nominated | |
| San Francisco Bay Area Film Critics Circle | 2015 | Best Cinematography | The Revenant | Nominated | |
| Satellite Awards | 2000 | Best Cinematography | Sleepy Hollow | Won | |
| Satellite Awards | 2005 | Best Cinematography | Lemony Snicket's A Series of Unfortunate Events | Nominated | |
| Satellite Awards | 2011 | Best Cinematography | The Tree of Life | Nominated | |
| Satellite Awards | 2014 | Best Cinematography | Gravity | Nominated | |
| Satellite Awards | 2015 | Best Cinematography | Birdman | Nominated | |
| Satellite Awards | 2016 | Best Cinematography | The Revenant | Nominated | |
| Sitges Film Festival | 1994 | Best Cinematography | Ámbar | Won | |
| St. Louis Film Critics Association | 2011 | Best Cinematography | The Tree of Life | Won | |
| St. Louis Film Critics Association | 2013 | Best Cinematography | Gravity | Nominated | |
| St. Louis Film Critics Association | 2014 | Best Cinematography | Birdman | Won | |
| St. Louis Film Critics Association | 2015 | Best Cinematography | The Revenant | Won | |
| Tokyo International Film Festival | 1992 | Best Artistic Contribution Award | Like Water for Chocolate | Won | |
| Venice Film Festival | 2006 | Golden Osella | Children of Men | Won | |
| Visual Effects Society | 2014 | Outstanding Virtual Cinematography in a Live Action Feature Motion Picture | Gravity | Won (Note: Shared with Tim Webber, Richard McBride, and Dale Newton.) | |
| Washington D.C. Area Film Critics Association | 2011 | Best Cinematography | The Tree of Life | Won | |
| Washington D.C. Area Film Critics Association | 2013 | Best Cinematography | Gravity | Won | |
| Washington D.C. Area Film Critics Association | 2014 | Best Cinematography | Birdman | Won | |
| Washington D.C. Area Film Critics Association | 2015 | Best Cinematography | The Revenant | Won | |
