= New York Film Critics Online =

American film criticism organization

- Abbreviation: NYFCO
- Formation: 2000
- Type: Film criticism
- Location: New York City, New York
- Official language: English
- Website: www.nyfco.net

The New York Film Critics Online (NYFCO) is an organization co-founded by Harvey S. Karten and Prairie Miller in 2000, composed of Internet film critics based in New York City. The group meets once a year, in December, for voting on its annual NYFCO Awards. Prairie Miller, Avi Offer and Karen Benardello form the NYFCO's Governing Committee, and members include such vet and influential critics as Rex Reed, Armond White, Stephanie Zacharek, and Emanuel Levy.

== 2001 ==
=== Various Awards ===
Sources:

- Best Actor: Tom Wilkinson – In the Bedroom
- Best Actress: Judi Dench – Iris
- Best Cinematography: The Man Who Wasn't There – Roger Deakins
- Best Debut Director: Todd Field – In the Bedroom
- Best Director: David Lynch – Mulholland Drive
- Best Documentary: The Gleaners and I
- Best Film: Mulholland Drive
- Best Foreign Language Film: 花樣年華 (In the Mood for Love) • Hong Kong
- Best Screenplay (Adapted): In the Bedroom – Todd Field and Robert Festinger
- Best Screenplay (Original): Mulholland Drive – David Lynch
- Best Supporting Actor: Steve Buscemi – Ghost World
- Best Supporting Actress: Maggie Smith – Gosford Park
- Breakthrough Performer: Naomi Watts – Mulholland Drive

== 2002 ==
=== Various Awards ===
- Best Actor: Daniel Day-Lewis – Gangs of New York
- Best Actress: Julianne Moore – Far from Heaven
- Best Animated Film: Spirited Away
- Best Cinematography: Far from Heaven – Edward Lachman
- Best Director: Todd Haynes – Far from Heaven and Martin Scorsese – Gangs of New York (tie)
- Best Documentary: Bowling for Columbine
- Best Film: Chicago
- Best Foreign Language Film: Y Tu Mamá También (And Your Mother Too) • Mexiko
- Best Screenplay: Far from Heaven – Todd Haynes
- Best Supporting Actor: Willem Dafoe – Spider-Man
- Best Supporting Actress: Edie Falco – Sunshine State

== 2003 ==
=== Top 10 Films ===
1. Lost in Translation
2. American Splendor
3. In America
4. 21 Grams
5. A Mighty Wind
5. Cold Mountain
5. Girl with a Pearl Earring
5. Lawless Heart
5. Les invasions barbares (The Barbarian Invasions)
10. The Station Agent

=== Various Awards ===
- Best Actor: Bill Murray – Lost in Translation
- Best Actress: Charlize Theron – Monster
- Best Animated Film: Finding Nemo
- Best Cinematography: Girl with a Pearl Earring – Eduardo Serra
- Best Director: Sofia Coppola – Lost in Translation
- Best Documentary: Winged Migration
- Best Film: Lost in Translation
- Best Foreign Language Film: Demonlover • France
- Best Screenplay: In America – Jim Sheridan, Naomi Sheridan, and Kirsten Sheridan
- Best Supporting Actor: Alec Baldwin – The Cooler
- Best Supporting Actress: Scarlett Johansson – Lost in Translation
- Breakthrough Performer: Peter Dinklage – The Station Agent

== 2004 ==
=== Top 9 Films ===
1. Sideways
2. The Aviator
3. Before Sunset
4. Ying xiong (Hero)
5. Kinsey
6. La mala educación (Bad Education)
7. The Incredibles
8. Diarios de motocicleta (The Motorcycle Diaries)
9. Shi mian mai fu (House of Flying Daggers)

=== Various Awards ===
- Best Actor: Jamie Foxx – Ray
- Best Actress: Imelda Staunton – Vera Drake
- Best Animated Film: The Incredibles
- Best Cinematography: Ying xiong (Hero) – Christopher Doyle
- Best Debut Director: Joshua Marston – Maria Full of Grace
- Best Director: Martin Scorsese – The Aviator
- Best Documentary: Broadway: The Golden Age and Super Size Me (tie)
- Best Film: Sideways
- Best Foreign Language Film: Diarios de motocicleta (The Motorcycle Diaries) • United States / Germany / UK / Argentina / Chile / Peru / France
- Best Screenplay: Eternal Sunshine of the Spotless Mind – Charlie Kaufman
- Best Supporting Actor: Thomas Haden Church – Sideways
- Best Supporting Actress: Virginia Madsen – Sideways
- Breakthrough Performer: Topher Grace – P.S. and In Good Company

== 2005 ==
=== Top 9 Films ===
(Alphabetical order)

- Brokeback Mountain
- Capote
- The Constant Gardener
- Crash
- Good Night, and Good Luck
- La meglio gioventù (The Best of Youth)
- Munich
- The Squid and the Whale
- Syriana

=== Various Awards ===
- Best Actor: Philip Seymour Hoffman – Capote
- Best Actress: Keira Knightley – Pride & Prejudice
- Best Animated Film: Wallace & Gromit: The Curse of the Were-Rabbit
- Best Cinematography: March of the Penguins – Laurent Chalet and Jérôme Maison
- Best Debut Director: Paul Haggis – Crash
- Best Director: Fernando Meirelles – The Constant Gardener
- Best Documentary: Grizzly Man
- Best Film: The Squid and the Whale
- Best Foreign Language Film: Der Untergang (Downfall) • Austria / Germany / Italy
- Best Screenplay: Crash – Paul Haggis
- Best Supporting Actor: Oliver Platt – Casanova
- Best Supporting Actress: Amy Adams – Junebug
- Breakthrough Performer: Terrence Howard – Crash, Four Brothers, Get Rich or Die Tryin', and Hustle & Flow

== 2006 ==
=== Top 10 Films ===
(Alphabetical order)

- Babel
- The Fountain
- Inland Empire
- Pan's Labyrinth (El laberinto del fauno)
- Little Children
- Little Miss Sunshine
- The Queen
- Thank You for Smoking
- Volver
- Water

=== Various Awards ===
- Best Actor: Forest Whitaker – The Last King of Scotland
- Best Actress: Helen Mirren – The Queen
- Best Animated Film: Happy Feet
- Best Cast: Little Miss Sunshine
- Best Cinematography: The Illusionist – Dick Pope
- Best Debut Director: Jonathan Dayton and Valerie Faris – Little Miss Sunshine
- Best Director: Stephen Frears – The Queen
- Best Documentary: An Inconvenient Truth
- Best Film: The Queen
- Best Film Music or Score: The Illusionist – Philip Glass
- Best Foreign Language Film: El laberinto del fauno (Pan's Labyrinth) • Mexico
- Best Screenplay: The Queen – Peter Morgan
- Best Supporting Actor: Michael Sheen – The Queen
- Best Supporting Actress: Jennifer Hudson – Dreamgirls and Catherine O'Hara – For Your Consideration (tie)
- Breakthrough Performer: Jennifer Hudson – Dreamgirls

== 2007 ==
=== Top 11 Films ===
(Alphabetical order)

- Atonement
- Before the Devil Knows You're Dead
- The Darjeeling Limited
- The Diving Bell and the Butterfly (Le scaphandre et le papillon)
- I'm Not There
- Juno
- Michael Clayton
- No Country for Old Men
- Persepolis
- Sweeney Todd: The Demon Barber of Fleet Street
- There Will Be Blood

=== Various Awards ===
- Best Actor: Daniel Day-Lewis – There Will Be Blood
- Best Actress: Julie Christie – Away from Her
- Best Animated Film: Persepolis
- Best Cast: Before the Devil Knows You're Dead
- Best Cinematography: There Will Be Blood – Robert Elswit
- Best Debut Director: Sarah Polley – Away from Her
- Best Director: Paul Thomas Anderson – There Will Be Blood
- Best Documentary: Sicko
- Best Film: The Diving Bell and the Butterfly (Le scaphandre et le papillon) and There Will Be Blood (tie)
- Best Film Music or Score: There Will Be Blood – Jonny Greenwood
- Best Foreign Language Film: Das Leben der Anderen (The Lives of Others) • Germany and Persepolis • France (tie)
- Best Screenplay: The Darjeeling Limited – Wes Anderson, Jason Schwartzman, and Roman Coppola
- Best Supporting Actor: Javier Bardem – No Country for Old Men
- Best Supporting Actress: Cate Blanchett – I'm Not There
- Breakthrough Performer: Elliot Page (Note: Credited as Ellen Page; Juno was released before Page came out as transgender.) – Juno

== 2008 ==
=== Top 10 Films ===
(Alphabetical order)

- Che
- A Christmas Tale (Un conte de Noël)
- The Curious Case of Benjamin Button
- The Dark Knight
- Happy-Go-Lucky
- Milk
- Rachel Getting Married
- Slumdog Millionaire
- WALL-E
- The Wrestler

=== Various Awards ===
- Best Actor: Sean Penn – Milk
- Best Actress: Sally Hawkins – Happy-Go-Lucky
- Best Animated Film: WALL-E
- Best Cast: Milk
- Best Cinematography: Slumdog Millionaire – Anthony Dod Mantle
- Best Debut Director: Martin McDonagh – In Bruges
- Best Director: Danny Boyle and Loveleen Tandan – Slumdog Millionaire
- Best Documentary: Man on Wire
- Best Film: Slumdog Millionaire
- Best Film Music or Score: Slumdog Millionaire – A. R. Rahman
- Best Foreign Language Film: 4 luni, 3 săptămâni și 2 zile (4 Months, 3 Weeks and 2 Days) • Romania
- Best Screenplay: Slumdog Millionaire – Simon Beaufoy
- Best Supporting Actor: Heath Ledger – The Dark Knight (post-humously)
- Best Supporting Actress: Penélope Cruz – Vicky Cristina Barcelona
- Breakthrough Performer: Sally Hawkins – Happy-Go-Lucky

== 2009 ==
=== Top 11 Films ===
(Alphabetical order)

- Adventureland
- Avatar
- Fantastic Mr. Fox
- The Hurt Locker
- Inglourious Basterds
- The Messenger
- Precious
- A Serious Man
- Two Lovers
- Up
- Up in the Air

=== Various Awards ===
- Best Actor: Jeff Bridges – Crazy Heart
- Best Actress: Meryl Streep – Julie & Julia
- Best Animated Film: Up
- Best Cast: In the Loop
- Best Cinematography: Inglourious Basterds – Robert Richardson
- Best Debut Director: Marc Webb – (500) Days of Summer
- Best Director: Kathryn Bigelow – The Hurt Locker
- Best Documentary: The Cove
- Best Film: Avatar
- Best Film Music or Score: Crazy Heart – Steve Bruton, T Bone Burnett, and Jeffrey Pollack
- Best Foreign Language Film: Das weiße Band – Eine deutsche Kindergeschichte (The White Ribbon) • Germany
- Best Screenplay: Inglourious Basterds – Quentin Tarantino
- Best Supporting Actor: Christoph Waltz – Inglourious Basterds
- Best Supporting Actress: Mo'Nique – Precious
- Breakthrough Performer: Christoph Waltz – Inglourious Basterds

== 2010 ==
=== Top 10 Films ===
(Alphabetical order)

- 127 Hours
- Another Year
- Black Swan
- Blue Valentine
- The Ghost Writer
- Inception
- The Kids Are All Right
- The King's Speech
- Scott Pilgrim vs. the World
- The Social Network

=== Various Awards ===
- Best Actor: James Franco – 127 Hours
- Best Actress: Natalie Portman – Black Swan
- Best Animated Film: Toy Story 3
- Best Cast: The Kids Are All Right
- Best Cinematography: Black Swan – Matthew Libatique
- Best Debut Director: John Wells – The Company Men
- Best Director: David Fincher – The Social Network
- Best Documentary: Exit Through the Gift Shop
- Best Film: The Social Network
- Best Film Music or Score: Black Swan – Clint Mansell
- Best Foreign Language Film: Io sono l'amore (I Am Love) • Italy
- Best Screenplay: The Social Network – Aaron Sorkin
- Best Supporting Actor: Christian Bale – The Fighter
- Best Supporting Actress: Melissa Leo – The Fighter
- Breakthrough Performer: Noomi Rapace – The Girl with the Dragon Tattoo

== 2011 ==
=== Top 10 Films ===
(Alphabetical order)

- The Artist
- The Descendants
- Drive
- The Help
- Hugo
- Melancholia
- Midnight in Paris
- Take Shelter
- The Tree of Life
- War Horse

=== Various Awards ===
- Best Actor: Michael Shannon – Take Shelter
- Best Actress: Meryl Streep – The Iron Lady
- Best Animated Film: The Adventures of Tintin: The Secret of the Unicorn
- Best Cast: Bridesmaids
- Best Cinematography: The Tree of Life – Emmanuel Lubezki
- Best Debut Director: Joe Cornish – Attack the Block
- Best Director: Michel Hazanavicius – The Artist
- Best Documentary: Cave of Forgotten Dreams
- Best Film: The Artist
- Best Film Music or Score: The Artist – Ludovic Bource
- Best Foreign Language Film: جدایی نادر از سیمین (A Separation) • Iran
- Best Screenplay: The Descendants – Nat Faxon, Jim Rash, and Alexander Payne
- Best Supporting Actor: Albert Brooks – Drive
- Best Supporting Actress: Melissa McCarthy – Bridesmaids
- Breakthrough Performer: Jessica Chastain – The Tree of Life, The Help, The Debt, and Take Shelter

== 2012 ==
=== Top 10 Films ===
(Alphabetical order)

- Argo
- Beasts of the Southern Wild
- Django Unchained
- Les Misérables
- Life of Pi
- Lincoln
- The Master
- Moonrise Kingdom
- Silver Linings Playbook
- Zero Dark Thirty

=== Various Awards ===
- Best Actor: Daniel Day-Lewis – Lincoln
- Best Actress: Emmanuelle Riva – Amour
- Best Animated Film: Chico and Rita
- Best Cast: Argo
- Best Cinematography: Life of Pi – Claudio Miranda
- Best Debut Director: Benh Zeitlin – Beasts of the Southern Wild
- Best Director: Kathryn Bigelow – Zero Dark Thirty
- Best Documentary: The Central Park Five
- Best Film: Zero Dark Thirty
- Best Film Music or Score: Django Unchained – Various Artists
- Best Foreign Language Film: Amour • France
- Best Screenplay: Zero Dark Thirty – Mark Boal
- Best Supporting Actor: Tommy Lee Jones – Lincoln
- Best Supporting Actress: Anne Hathaway – Les Misérables
- Breakthrough Performer: Quvenzhané Wallis – Beasts of the Southern Wild

== 2013 ==
=== Top 11 Films ===
(Alphabetical order)

- 12 Years a Slave
- Before Midnight
- Blue Is the Warmest Colour
- Dallas Buyers Club
- Gravity
- Her
- Inside Llewyn Davis
- Nebraska
- Philomena
- Prisoners
- The Wolf of Wall Street

=== Various Awards ===
- Best Actor: Chiwetel Ejiofor – 12 Years a Slave
- Best Actress: Cate Blanchett – Blue Jasmine
- Best Animated Film: The Wind Rises
- Best Cast: American Hustle
- Best Cinematography: Gravity – Emmanuel Lubezki
- Best Debut Director: Ryan Coogler – Fruitvale Station
- Best Director: Alfonso Cuarón – Gravity
- Best Documentary: The Act of Killing
- Best Film: 12 Years a Slave
- Best Film Music or Score: Inside Llewyn Davis – T Bone Burnett
- Best Foreign Language Film: La Vie d'Adèle : Chapitres 1 et 2 (Blue Is the Warmest Colour) • France
- Best Screenplay: Her – Spike Jonze
- Best Supporting Actor: Jared Leto – Dallas Buyers Club
- Best Supporting Actress: Lupita Nyong'o – 12 Years a Slave
- Breakthrough Performer: Adèle Exarchopoulos – Blue Is the Warmest Colour

== 2014 ==
=== Top 10 Films ===
(Alphabetical order)

- Birdman or (The Unexpected Virtue of Ignorance)
- Boyhood
- Guardians of the Galaxy
- The Imitation Game
- A Most Violent Year
- Mr. Turner
- Selma
- The Theory of Everything
- Under the Skin
- Whiplash

=== Various Awards ===
- Best Actor: Eddie Redmayne – The Theory of Everything
- Best Actress: Marion Cotillard – Two Days, One Night
- Best Animated Film: The Lego Movie
- Best Cast: Birdman or (The Unexpected Virtue of Ignorance)
- Best Cinematography: Birdman or (The Unexpected Virtue of Ignorance) – Emmanuel Lubezki
- Best Debut Director: Dan Gilroy – Nightcrawler
- Best Director: Richard Linklater – Boyhood
- Best Documentary: Life Itself
- Best Film: Boyhood
- Best Film Music or Score: Get On Up – Thomas Newman
- Best Foreign Language Film: Deux jours, une nuit (Two Days, One Night) • Belgium
- Best Screenplay: Birdman or (The Unexpected Virtue of Ignorance) – Alejandro G. Iñárritu, Nicolás Giacobone, Alexander Dinelaris, Jr., and Armando Bo
- Best Supporting Actor: J. K. Simmons – Whiplash
- Best Supporting Actress: Patricia Arquette – Boyhood
- Breakthrough Performer: Jack O'Connell – Unbroken and Starred Up

== 2015 ==
=== Top 10 Films ===
(Alphabetical order)

- 45 Years
- The Big Short
- Bridge of Spies
- Brooklyn
- Carol
- Mad Max: Fury Road
- Sicario
- Spotlight
- Steve Jobs
- Trumbo

=== Various Awards ===
- Best Actor: Paul Dano – Love & Mercy
- Best Actress: Brie Larson – Room
- Best Animated Film: Inside Out
- Best Cast: Spotlight
- Best Cinematography: Mad Max: Fury Road – John Seale
- Best Debut Director: Alex Garland – Ex Machina
- Best Director: Tom McCarthy – Spotlight
- Best Documentary: Amy
- Best Film: Spotlight
- Best Film Music or Score: Love & Mercy – Brian Wilson and Atticus Ross
- Best Foreign Language Film: Saul fia (Son of Saul) • Hungary
- Best Screenplay: Spotlight – Tom McCarthy and Josh Singer
- Best Supporting Actor: Mark Rylance – Bridge of Spies
- Best Supporting Actress: Rooney Mara – Carol
- Breakthrough Performer: Alicia Vikander – The Danish Girl and Ex Machina

== 2016 ==
=== Top 12 Films ===
(Alphabetical order)

- Arrival
- Fences
- Free State of Jones
- Hell or High Water
- I, Daniel Blake
- Jackie
- La La Land
- Loving
- Manchester by the Sea
- Moonlight
- O.J.: Made in America
- Toni Erdmann

=== Various Awards ===
- Best Actor: Casey Affleck – Manchester by the Sea
- Best Actress: Isabelle Huppert – Elle
- Best Animated Film: Kubo and the Two Strings
- Best Cast: Moonlight
- Best Cinematography: Moonlight – James Laxton
- Best Debut Director: Robert Eggers – The Witch
- Best Director: Barry Jenkins – Moonlight
- Best Documentary: 13th
- Best Film: Moonlight
- Best Film Music or Score: La La Land – Justin Hurwitz
- Best Foreign Language Film: 아가씨 (The Handmaiden) • South Korea
- Best Screenplay: Moonlight – Barry Jenkins
- Best Supporting Actor: Mahershala Ali – Moonlight
- Best Supporting Actress: Viola Davis – Fences
- Breakthrough Performer: Ruth Negga – Loving

== 2017 ==
=== Top 10 Films ===
(Alphabetical order)

- Call Me by Your Name
- Dunkirk
- The Florida Project
- Get Out
- I, Tonya
- Lady Bird
- Mudbound
- Phantom Thread
- The Post
- The Shape of Water

=== Various Awards ===
- Best Actor: Gary Oldman – Darkest Hour
- Best Actress: Margot Robbie – I, Tonya
- Best Animated Film: Coco
- Best Cast: Mudbound
- Best Cinematography: The Shape of Water – Dan Laustsen
- Best Debut Director: Jordan Peele – Get Out
- Best Director: Dee Rees – Mudbound
- Best Documentary: Bombshell: The Hedy Lamarr Story
- Best Film: The Florida Project and Mudbound (tie)
- Best Film Music or Score: Baby Driver – Steven Price and Kristen Lane
- Best Foreign Language Film: Aus dem Nichts (In the Fade) • Germany
- Best Screenplay: Get Out – Jordan Peele
- Best Supporting Actor: Willem Dafoe – The Florida Project
- Best Supporting Actress: Allison Janney – I, Tonya
- Breakthrough Performer: Timothée Chalamet – Call Me by Your Name

== 2018 ==
=== Top 10 Films ===
- BlacKkKlansman
- Eighth Grade
- The Favourite
- First Reformed
- Green Book
- If Beale Street Could Talk
- Leave No Trace
- Roma
- A Star Is Born
- Vice

=== Various Awards ===
- Best Actor: Ethan Hawke - First Reformed
- Best Actress: Melissa McCarthy - Can You Ever Forgive Me?
- Best Animated Feature: Spider-Man: Into the Spider-Verse
- Best Breakthrough Performance: Elsie Fisher - Eighth Grade
- Best Cinematography: Roma
- Best Director: Alfonso Cuaron - Roma
- Best Debut Director: Bo Burnham - Eighth Grade
- Best Documentary: Won't You Be My Neighbor?
- Best Ensemble: The Favourite
- Best Foreign Language Film: Cold War
- Best Screenplay: The Favourite
- Best Supporting Actor: Richard E. Grant - Can You Ever Forgive Me?
- Best Supporting Actress: Regina King - If Beale Street Could Talk
- Best Use of Music: If Beale Street Could Talk

== 2019 ==
=== Top 10 Films ===
(Alphabetical order)

- 1917
- The Farewell
- Hustlers
- The Irishman
- Jojo Rabbit
- Joker
- Marriage Story
- Once Upon a Time in Hollywood
- Parasite
- The Two Popes

=== Various Awards ===
- Best Actor: Joaquin Phoenix – Joker
- Best Actress: Lupita Nyong'o – Us
- Best Animated Film: I Lost My Body
- Best Cast: Knives Out
- Best Cinematography: 1917 – Roger Deakins
- Best Debut Director: Lila Avilés – The Chambermaid
- Best Director: Bong Joon-ho – Parasite
- Best Documentary: Apollo 11
- Best Film: Parasite
- Best Foreign Language Film: Portrait of a Lady on Fire • France
- Best Screenplay: Parasite – Bong Joon-ho and Han Jin-won
- Best Supporting Actor: Joe Pesci – The Irishman
- Best Supporting Actress: Laura Dern – Marriage Story
- Best Use of Music: Rocketman
- Breakthrough Performer: Kelvin Harrison, Jr. – Luce and Waves

== 2020 ==
=== Top 10 Films ===
(Alphabetical order)

- The Assistant
- First Cow
- I'm Thinking of Ending Things
- Minari
- Never Rarely Sometimes Always
- Nomadland
- One Night in Miami...
- Promising Young Woman
- Tommaso
- The Trial of the Chicago 7

=== Various Awards ===
- Best Actor: Riz Ahmed – Sound of Metal
- Best Actress: Carey Mulligan – Promising Young Woman
- Best Animated Film: Soul
- Best Cast: The Trial of the Chicago 7
- Best Cinematography: Joshua James Richards – Nomadland
- Best Debut Director: Emerald Fennell – Promising Young Woman
- Best Director: Chloé Zhao – Nomadland
- Best Documentary: The Way I See It
- Best Film: Minari
- Best Foreign Language Film: Minari • United States
- Best Screenplay: Emerald Fennell – Promising Young Woman
- Best Supporting Actor: Leslie Odom, Jr. – One Night in Miami...
- Best Supporting Actress: Ellen Burstyn – Pieces of a Woman and Youn Yuh-jung – Minari (tie)
- Best Use of Music: Branford Marsalis – Ma Rainey's Black Bottom
- Breakthrough Performer: Kingsley Ben-Adir – One Night in Miami... and Maria Bakalova – Borat Subsequent Moviefilm (tie)

== 2021 ==
=== Top 10 Films ===
(Alphabetical order)

- Belfast
- Don't Look Up
- Dune
- King Richard
- Licorice Pizza
- The Lost Daughter
- Passing
- Pig
- The Power of the Dog
- West Side Story

=== Various Awards ===
- Best Film: The Power of the Dog
- Best Director: Jane Campion – The Power of the Dog
- Best Actor: Benedict Cumberbatch – The Power of the Dog
- Best Actress: Tessa Thompson – Passing
- Best Supporting Actor: Kodi Smit-McPhee – The Power of the Dog
- Best Supporting Actress: Ruth Negga – Passing
- Best Screenplay: The Power of the Dog – Jane Campion
- Best Foreign Language Film: Drive My Car
- Best Documentary: Flee • Denmark
- Best Animated Film: The Mitchells vs. The Machines
- Best Cast: The Power of the Dog
- Best Debut Director: Rebecca Hall – Passing
- Best Cinematography: The Power of the Dog – Ari Wegner
- Best Use of Music: West Side Story
- Breakthrough Performer: Ariana DeBose – West Side Story

== 2022 ==
=== Top 10 Films ===
(Alphabetical order)

- Avatar: The Way of Water
- Babylon
- The Banshees Of Inisherin
- Everything Everywhere All at Once
- The Fabelmans
- RRR
- She Said
- Tár
- Top Gun: Maverick
- Women Talking

=== Various Awards ===
- Best Film: The Banshees Of Inisherin
- Best Director: Daniels – Everything Everywhere All at Once & Martin McDonagh – The Banshees Of Inisherin (TIE)
- Best Actor: Colin Farrell – The Banshees Of Inisherin
- Best Actress: Michelle Yeoh – Everything Everywhere All at Once
- Best Supporting Actor: Brendan Gleeson – The Banshees Of Inisherin
- Best Supporting Actress: Hong Chau – The Whale
- Best Screenplay: The Banshees Of Inisherin – Martin McDonagh
- Best Foreign Language Film: EO • Poland
- Best Documentary:All the Beauty and the Bloodshed
- Best Animated Film: Marcel the Shell with Shoes On
- Best Cast: Glass Onion: A Knives Out Mystery
- Best Debut Director: Charlotte Wells – Aftersun
- Best Cinematography: Nope – Hoyte van Hoytema
- Best Use of Music: Elvis
- Breakthrough Performer: Austin Butler – Elvis

== 2023 ==
=== Top 10 Films ===
(Alphabetical order)

- American Fiction
- Anatomy of a Fall
- The Holdovers
- Killers of the Flower Moon
- Maestro
- May December
- Oppenheimer
- Poor Things
- Past Lives
- Spider-Man: Across the Spider-Verse

=== Various Awards ===
- Best Film: Killers of the Flower Moon
- Best Director: Christopher Nolan – Oppenheimer
- Best Actor: Cillian Murphy – Oppenheimer
- Best Actress: Sandra Hüller – Anatomy of a Fall
- Best Supporting Actor: Mark Ruffalo – Poor Things
- Best Supporting Actress: Da'Vine Joy Randolph – The Holdovers
- Best Screenplay: Anatomy of a Fall – Justine Triet & Arthur Harari
- Best Foreign Language Film: Anatomy of a Fall • France
- Best Documentary: The Eternal Memory
- Best Animated Film: Spider-Man: Across the Spider-Verse
- Best Ensemble Cast: Oppenheimer
- Best Debut Director: Celine Song – Past Lives
- Best Cinematography: Oppenheimer – Hoyte van Hoytema
- Best Use of Music: Barbie
- Breakthrough Performer: Charles Melton – May December

== 2024 ==
- Best Picture: The Substance
  - Runner-up: The Brutalist
- Best Director: Coralie Fargeat – The Substance
  - Runner-up: Brady Corbet – The Brutalist
- Best Actor: Adrien Brody – The Brutalist
  - Runner-up: Ralph Fiennes – Conclave
- Best Actress: Marianne Jean-Baptiste – Hard Truths
  - Runner-up: Demi Moore – The Substance
- Best Supporting Actor: Clarence Maclin – Sing Sing
  - Runner-up: Guy Pearce – The Brutalist
- Best Supporting Actress: Natasha Lyonne – His Three Daughters
  - Runner-up: Danielle Deadwyler – The Piano Lesson
- Best Screenplay: The Brutalist – Brady Corbet & Mona Fastvold
  - Runner-up: The Substance – Coralie Fargeat
- Best International Feature: All We Imagine as Light • India
  - Runner-up: I'm Still Here • Brazil
- Best Documentary: No Other Land
  - Runner-up: Dahomey
- Best Animated Film: Flow
  - Runner-up: The Wild Robot
- Best Ensemble Cast: Conclave
  - Runner-up: Sing Sing
- Best Debut Director: Annie Baker – Janet Planet
  - Runner-up: Josh Margolin – Thelma
- Best Cinematography: The Brutalist – Lol Crawley
  - Runner-up: Conclave – Stéphane Fontaine
- Best Use of Music: The Brutalist
  - Runner-up: Wicked
- Breakthrough Performer: Mikey Madison – Anora
  - Runner-up: Clarence Maclin – Sing Sing
