= Adam Schroeder =

American film producer

Adam Schroeder is an American film producer. In 2001, he started Adam Schroeder Prods. at Warner Bros. Pictures. Before that, he was with Scott Rudin Prods. at Paramount Pictures for six years, as a production president. He produced films such as The Truman Show, A Simple Plan, and Sleepy Hollow. Prior to joining Rudin in 1994, he worked with Richard Donner and Lauren Shuler Donner.

== Selected works ==
Co-producer

- Clueless (1995)
- Mother (1996)
- Ransom (1996)
- Marvin's Room (1996)

Executive producer

- The First Wives Club (1996)
- In & Out (1997)
- South Park: Bigger, Longer & Uncut (1999)
- Bringing Out the Dead (1999)
- Angela's Ashes (1999)
- Wonder Boys (2000)
- Rules of Engagement (2000)
- Shaft (2000)
- Zoolander (2001)
- Orange County (2002)
- Changing Lanes (2002)
- Marci X (2003)
- Hysteria (2014) (TV pilot)
- Action Point (2018)
- Panic (2021) (Also showrunner)

Producer

- Clueless (1996−99)
- The Truman Show (1998)
- A Simple Plan (1998)
- Sleepy Hollow (1999)
- The Tuxedo (2002)
- A Little Bit of Heaven (2011)
- Chronicle (2012)
