= New York Film Critics Online Awards 2003 =

Annual US film awards ceremony

3rd New York Film Critics Online Awards

December 15, 2003

The 3rd New York Film Critics Online Awards, honoring the best in filmmaking in 2003, were given on 15 December 2003.

== Top 10 Films ==
1. Lost in Translation
2. American Splendor
3. In America
4. 21 Grams
5. A Mighty Wind
5. Cold Mountain
5. Girl with a Pearl Earring
5. Lawless Heart
5. Les invasions barbares (The Barbarian Invasions)
10. The Station Agent

== Winners ==
- Best Actor: Bill Murray – Lost in Translation
- Best Actress: Charlize Theron – Monster
- Best Animated Film: Finding Nemo
- Best Cinematography: Girl with a Pearl Earring – Eduardo Serra
- Best Director: Sofia Coppola – Lost in Translation
- Best Documentary: Winged Migration
- Best Film: Lost in Translation
- Best Foreign Language Film: Demonlover • France
- Best Screenplay: In America – Jim Sheridan, Naomi Sheridan, and Kirsten Sheridan
- Best Supporting Actor: Alec Baldwin – The Cooler
- Best Supporting Actress: Scarlett Johansson – Lost in Translation
- Breakthrough Performer: Peter Dinklage – The Station Agent

Preceded by NYFCO Awards 2002 (2nd)	New York Film Critics Online Awards; 2003	Succeeded by NYFCO Awards 2004 (4th)
