= New York Film Critics Online Awards 2007 =

Annual US film awards ceremony

7th NYFCCO Awards

December 9, 2007

Best Film:
The Diving Bell & the Butterfly
There Will Be Blood

The 7th New York Film Critics Online Awards, honoring the best in filmmaking in 2007, were given on 9 December 2007.

== Top 11 films ==
(in alphabetical order)

- Atonement
- Before the Devil Knows You're Dead
- The Darjeeling Limited
- The Diving Bell and the Butterfly (Le scaphandre et le papillon)
- I'm Not There
- Juno
- Michael Clayton
- No Country for Old Men
- Persepolis
- Sweeney Todd: The Demon Barber of Fleet Street
- There Will Be Blood

== Winners ==
- Best Actor:
  - Daniel Day-Lewis - There Will Be Blood as Daniel Plainview
- Best Actress:
  - Julie Christie - Away from Her as Fiona Anderson
- Best Animated Film:
  - Persepolis
- Best Breakthrough Performance:
  - Elliot Page (Note: Credited as Ellen Page; Juno was released before Page came out as transgender.) - Juno
- Best Cast:
  - Before the Devil Knows You're Dead
- Best Cinematography:
  - There Will Be Blood - Robert Elswit
- Best Debut Director:
  - Sarah Polley - Away from Her
- Best Director:
  - Paul Thomas Anderson - There Will Be Blood
- Best Documentary Film:
  - Sicko
- Best Film: (tie)
  - The Diving Bell and the Butterfly (Le scaphandre et le papillon)
  - There Will Be Blood
- Best Film Score:
  - There Will Be Blood - Jonny Greenwood
- Best Foreign Language Film:
  - The Lives of Others (Das Leben der Anderen) • Germany
  - Persepolis • France
- Best Screenplay:
  - The Darjeeling Limited - Wes Anderson, Jason Schwartzman & Roman Coppola
- Best Supporting Actor:
  - Javier Bardem - No Country for Old Men as Anton Chigurh
- Best Supporting Actress:
  - Cate Blanchett - I'm Not There as Jude Quinn/Bob Dylan

== Notes ==
Preceded by NYFCO Awards 2006 (6th)	New York Film Critics Online Awards; 2007	Succeeded by NYFCO Awards 2008 (8th)
