= New York Film Critics Online Awards 2013 =

Annual US film awards ceremony

13th NYFCO Awards

December 8, 2013

Best Film:
12 Years a Slave

The 13th New York Film Critics Online Awards, honoring the best in filmmaking in 2013, were given on December 8, 2013.

== Winners ==
- Best Actor:
  - Chiwetel Ejiofor – 12 Years a Slave
- Best Actress:
  - Cate Blanchett – Blue Jasmine
- Best Animated Film:
  - The Wind Rises
- Best Cast:
  - American Hustle
- Best Cinematography:
  - Gravity – Emmanuel Lubezki
- Best Debut Director:
  - Ryan Coogler – Fruitvale Station
- Best Director:
  - Alfonso Cuarón – Gravity
- Best Documentary Film:
  - The Act of Killing
- Best Film:
  - 12 Years a Slave
- Best Film Music or Score:
  - Inside Llewyn Davis – T Bone Burnett
- Best Foreign Language Film:
  - Blue Is the Warmest Colour • France
- Best Screenplay:
  - Her – Spike Jonze
- Best Supporting Actor:
  - Jared Leto – Dallas Buyers Club
- Best Supporting Actress:
  - Lupita Nyong'o – 12 Years a Slave
- Breakthrough Performer:
  - Adèle Exarchopoulos – Blue Is the Warmest Colour

== NYFCO Best Films of 2013 ==
- 12 Years a Slave
- Before Midnight
- Blue Is the Warmest Colour
- Dallas Buyers Club
- Gravity
- Her
- Inside Llewyn Davis
- Nebraska
- Philomena
- Prisoners
- The Wolf of Wall Street

Preceded by NYFCO Awards 2012	New York Film Critics Online Awards; 2013	Succeeded by NYFCO Awards 2014
