= New York Film Critics Online Awards 2009 =

Annual US film awards ceremony

9th NYFCO Awards

December 13, 2009

Best Film:
Avatar

The 9th New York Film Critics Online Awards, honoring the best in filmmaking in 2009, were given on 13 December 2009.

== Top 11 films ==
(in alphabetical order)

- Adventureland
- Avatar
- Fantastic Mr. Fox
- The Hurt Locker
- Inglourious Basterds
- The Messenger
- Precious
- A Serious Man
- Two Lovers
- Up
- Up in the Air

== Winners ==
- Best Actor:
  - Jeff Bridges - Crazy Heart as Bad Blake
- Best Actress:
  - Meryl Streep - Julie and Julia as Julia Child
- Best Animated Film:
  - Up
- Best Cast:
  - In the Loop
- Best Cinematography
  - Inglourious Basterds - Robert Richardson
- Best Debut Director:
  - Marc Webb - (500) Days of Summer
- Best Director:
  - Kathryn Bigelow - The Hurt Locker
- Best Documentary Film:
  - The Cove
- Best Film:
  - Avatar
- Best Film Music or Score:
  - Crazy Heart - Steve Bruton, T-Bone Burnett and Jeffrey Pollack
- Best Foreign Language Film:
  - The White Ribbon • Germany
- Best Screenplay:
  - Quentin Tarantino - Inglourious Basterds
- Best Supporting Actor:
  - Christoph Waltz - Inglourious Basterds as Col. Hans Landa
- Best Supporting Actress:
  - Mo'Nique - Precious as Mary
- Breakthrough Performer:
  - Christoph Waltz - Inglourious Basterds

Preceded by NYFCO Awards 2008	New York Film Critics Online Awards; 2009	Succeeded by NYFCO Awards 2010
