= New York Film Critics Online Awards 2010 =

Annual US film awards ceremony

10th NYFCO Awards

December 12, 2010

Best Film:
The Social Network

The 10th New York Film Critics Online Awards, honoring the best in filmmaking in 2010, were given on 12 December 2010.

== Winners ==
- Best Actor:
  - James Franco - 127 Hours as Aron Ralston
- Best Actress:
  - Natalie Portman - Black Swan as Nina Sayers
- Best Animated Film:
  - Toy Story 3
- Best Cast:
  - The Kids Are All Right
- Best Cinematography
  - Black Swan - Matthew Libatique
- Best Debut Director:
  - John Wells - The Company Men
- Best Director:
  - David Fincher - The Social Network
- Best Documentary Film:
  - Exit Through the Gift Shop
- Best Film:
  - The Social Network
- Best Film Music or Score:
  - Black Swan - Clint Mansell
- Best Foreign Language Film:
  - I Am Love • Italy
- Best Screenplay:
  - Aaron Sorkin - The Social Network
- Best Supporting Actor:
  - Christian Bale - The Fighter as Dicky Eklund
- Best Supporting Actress:
  - Melissa Leo - The Fighter as Alice Eklund
- Breakthrough Performer:
  - Noomi Rapace - The Girl with the Dragon Tattoo

=== Top Ten Pictures of 2010 ===
- 127 Hours
- Another Year
- Black Swan
- Blue Valentine
- The Ghost Writer
- Inception
- The Kids Are All Right
- The King's Speech
- Scott Pilgrim vs. the World
- The Social Network

Preceded by NYFCO Awards 2009	New York Film Critics Online Awards; 2010	Succeeded by NYFCO Awards 2011
