= New York Film Critics Online Awards 2004 =

Annual US film awards ceremony

4th New York Film Critics Online Awards

December 11, 2004

The 4th New York Film Critics Online Awards, honoring the best in filmmaking in 2004, were given on 11 December 2004.

== Top 9 Films ==
1. Sideways
2. The Aviator
3. Before Sunset
4. Ying xiong (Hero)
5. Kinsey
6. La mala educación (Bad Education)
7. The Incredibles
8. Diarios de motocicleta (The Motorcycle Diaries)
9. Shi mian mai fu (House of Flying Daggers)

== Winners ==
- Best Actor: Jamie Foxx – Ray
- Best Actress: Imelda Staunton – Vera Drake
- Best Animated Film: The Incredibles
- Best Cinematography: Ying xiong (Hero) – Christopher Doyle
- Best Debut Director: Joshua Marston – Maria Full of Grace
- Best Director: Martin Scorsese – The Aviator
- Best Documentary: Broadway: The Golden Age and Super Size Me (tie)
- Best Film: Sideways
- Best Foreign Language Film: Diarios de motocicleta (The Motorcycle Diaries) • United States/Germany/UK/Argentina/Chile/Peru/France
- Best Screenplay: Eternal Sunshine of the Spotless Mind – Charlie Kaufman
- Best Supporting Actor: Thomas Haden Church – Sideways
- Best Supporting Actress: Virginia Madsen – Sideways
- Breakthrough Performer: Topher Grace – P.S. and In Good Company

Preceded by NYFCO Awards 2003	New York Film Critics Online Awards; 2004	Succeeded by NYFCO Awards 2005
