= New York Film Critics Online Awards 2012 =

Annual US film awards ceremony

12th NYFCO Awards

December 9, 2011

Best Film:
Zero Dark Thirty

The 12th New York Film Critics Online Awards, honoring the best in filmmaking in 2012, were given on December 9, 2012.

== Winners ==
- Best Actor:
  - Daniel Day-Lewis – Lincoln
- Best Actress:
  - Emmanuelle Riva – Amour
- Best Animated Film:
  - Chico and Rita
- Best Cast:
  - Argo
- Best Cinematography:
  - Life of Pi – Claudio Miranda
- Best Debut Director:
  - Benh Zeitlin – Beasts of the Southern Wild
- Best Director:
  - Kathryn Bigelow – Zero Dark Thirty
- Best Documentary Film:
  - The Central Park Five
- Best Film:
  - Zero Dark Thirty
- Best Film Music or Score:
  - Django Unchained – Various Artists
- Best Foreign Language Film:
  - Amour • France
- Best Screenplay:
  - Zero Dark Thirty – Mark Boal
- Best Supporting Actor:
  - Tommy Lee Jones – Lincoln
- Best Supporting Actress:
  - Anne Hathaway – Les Misérables
- Breakthrough Performer:
  - Quvenzhané Wallis – Beasts of the Southern Wild

== NYFCO Best Films of 2012 ==
- Argo
- Beasts of the Southern Wild
- Django Unchained
- Les Misérables
- Life of Pi
- Lincoln
- The Master
- Moonrise Kingdom
- Silver Linings Playbook
- Zero Dark Thirty

| Preceded by NYFCO Awards 2011 | New York Film Critics Online Awards; 2012 | Succeeded by NYFCO Awards 2013 |
