= San Francisco Film Critics Circle Awards 2011 =

Annual US film awards ceremony

10th SFFCC Awards

December 11, 2011

Best Picture:
The Tree of Life

The 10th San Francisco Film Critics Circle Awards, honoring the best in film for 2011, were given on 11 December 2011.

== Winners ==
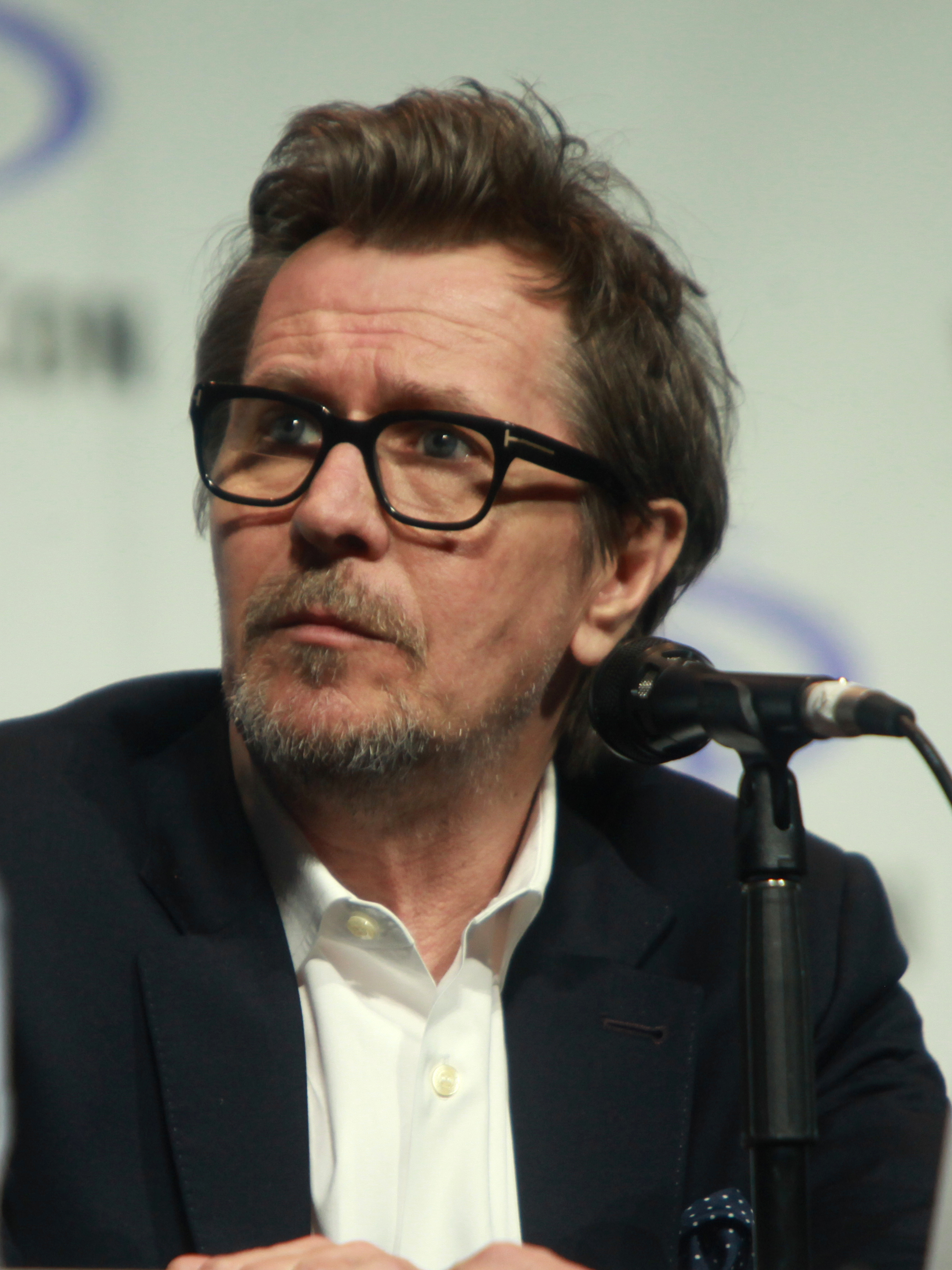
Gary Oldman, Best Actor winner

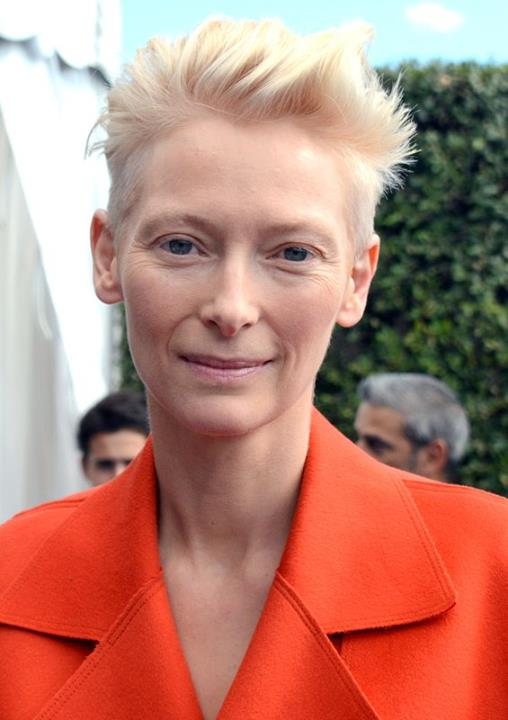
Tilda Swinton, Best Actress winner

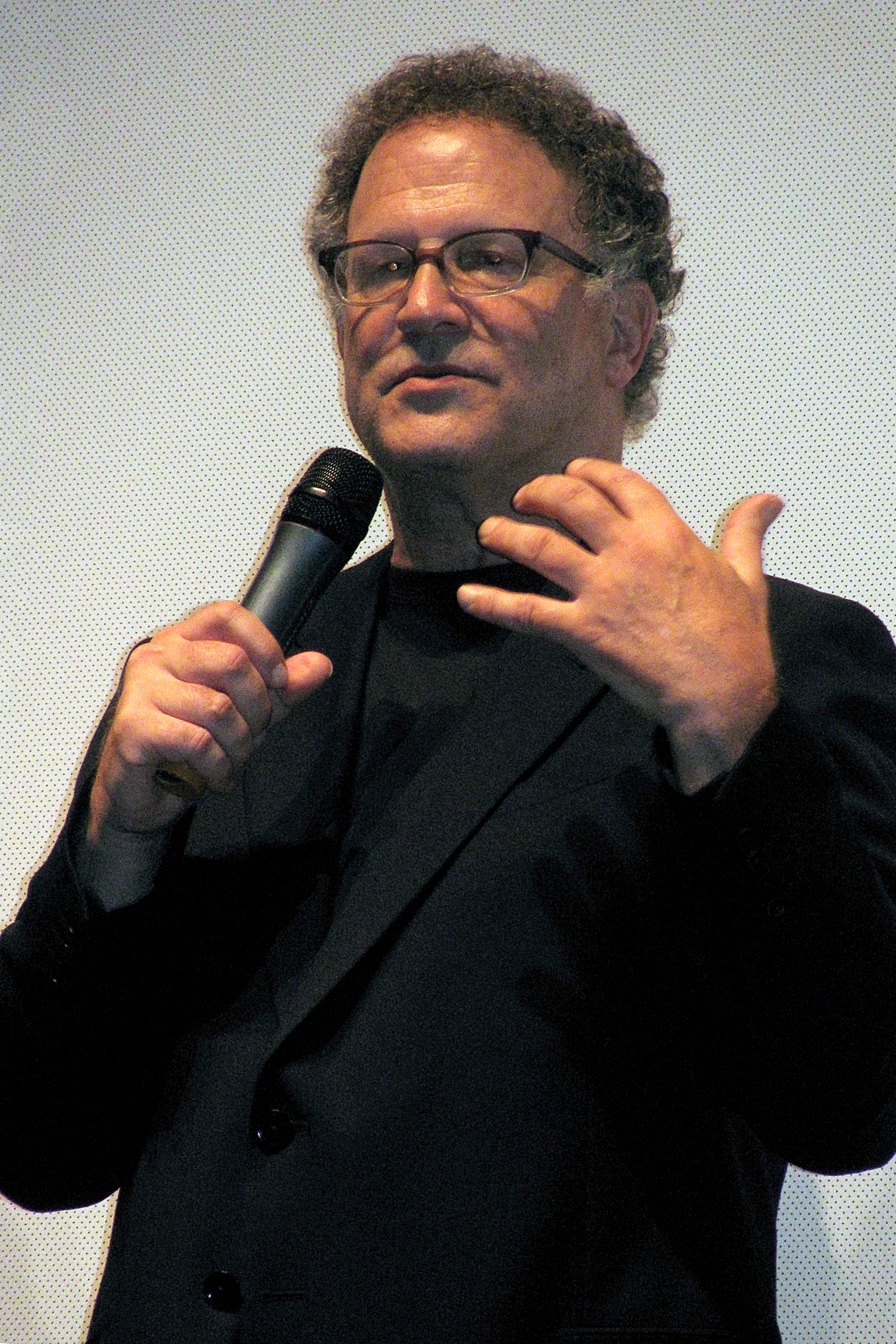
Albert Brooks, Best Supporting Actor winner

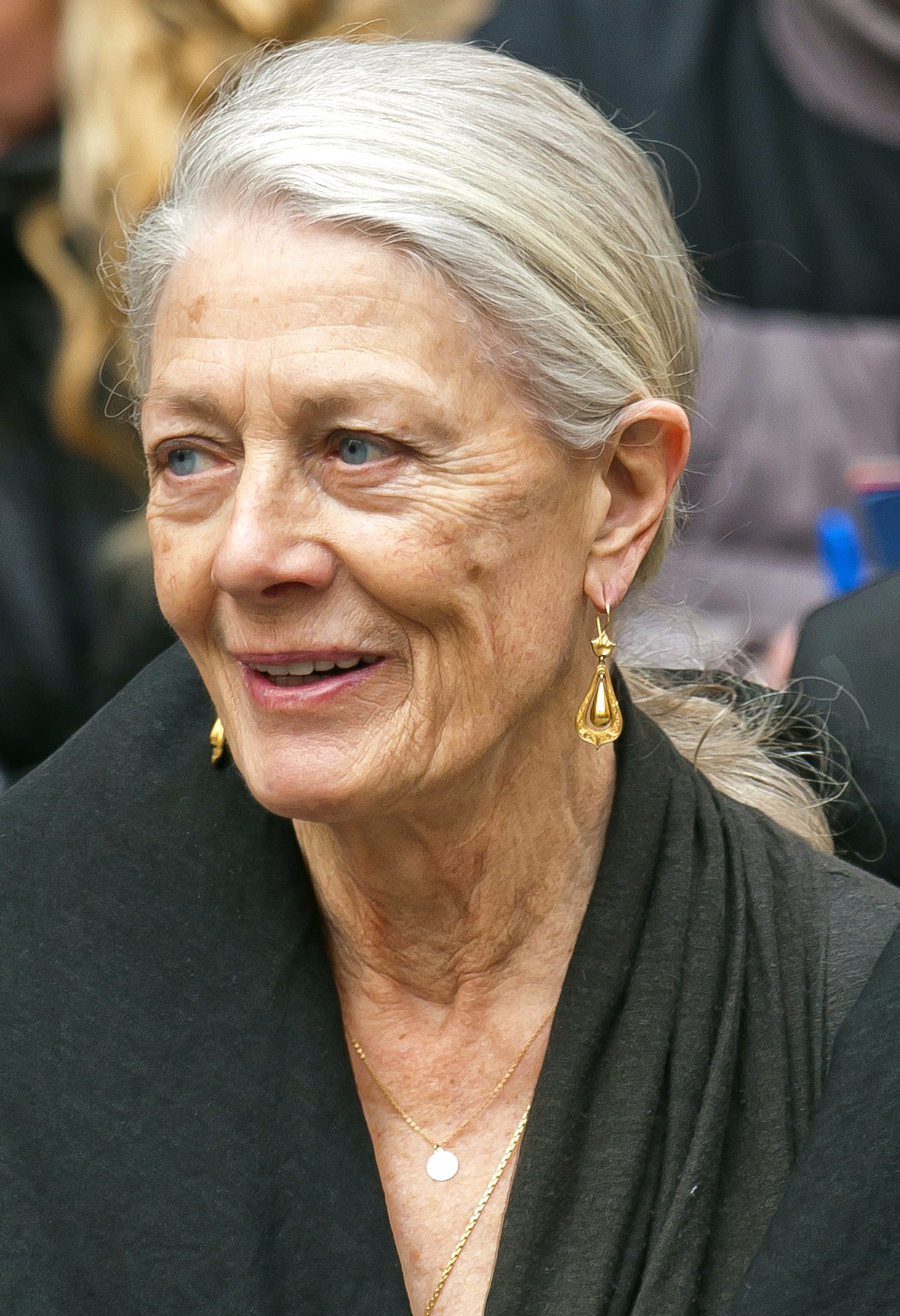
Vanessa Redgrave, Best Supporting Actress winner

- Best Picture:
  - The Tree of Life
- Best Director:
  - Terrence Malick – The Tree of Life
- Best Original Screenplay:
  - Margin Call – J. C. Chandor
- Best Adapted Screenplay:
  - Tinker Tailor Soldier Spy – Bridget O'Connor and Peter Straughan
- Best Actor:
  - Gary Oldman – Tinker Tailor Soldier Spy
- Best Actress:
  - Tilda Swinton – We Need to Talk About Kevin
- Best Supporting Actor:
  - Albert Brooks – Drive
- Best Supporting Actress:
  - Vanessa Redgrave – Coriolanus
- Best Animated Feature:
  - Rango
- Best Foreign Language Film:
  - Certified Copy (Copie conforme) • France
- Best Documentary:
  - Tabloid
- Best Cinematography:
  - The Tree of Life – Emmanuel Lubezki
- Marlon Riggs Award (for courage & vision in the Bay Area film community):
  - National Film Preservation Foundation, in recognition of for its work in the preservation and dissemination of endangered, culturally significant films
- Special Citation (for under-appreciated independent cinema):
  - The Mill and the Cross
