= Keith Short =

British sculptor (1941–2020)

- Born: 8 March 1941
- Died: 11 September 2020 (aged 79)
- Education: Wolverhampton College of Art
- Occupation: Sculptor

Keith Short (8 March 1941 – 11 September 2020) was a British sculptor, primarily working within the feature film industry in the UK.

Short has worked on most of the large-scale film productions made in the UK, and helped to create several iconic pieces such as the Batmobile for Tim Burton's Batman, the Ark of the Covenant and the Golden Fertility Idol for Steven Spielberg's film Raiders of the Lost Ark, Emperor Palpatine's chair in Return of the Jedi and the Tree of the Dead for Sleepy Hollow.

He has been the head of a department of sculptors on many films including Oliver Stone's Alexander, The Mummy, The Mummy Returns, Star Wars: Episode I – The Phantom Menace, Mortal Kombat, The Fifth Element, The Princess Bride, Willow, Highlander and Greystoke - The Legend of Tarzan, Lord of the Apes.

Short studied sculpture at Wolverhampton College of Art and moved to London where he began his career as a stone carver and lettering artist. His early work includes ornate finials for the Henry VII chapel, Westminster Abbey and a relief panel, cast into bronze, of the former Waterloo Bridge, now sited beneath Hungerford Bridge, London. Keith started on feature films in 1978, working on Ridley Scott's Alien and most recently worked on Prometheus, Hugo and Harry Potter and the Deathly Hallows, parts I and II.

== Filmography ==
- Jack the Giant Slayer
- Dark Shadows
- Prometheus
- Hugo
- Clash of the Titans
- Harry Potter and the Deathly Hallows, parts I and II
- Prince of Persia
- Quantum of Solace
- Agent Crush
- Stormbreaker
- Basic Instinct 2
- Land of the Blind
- Fragile
- Where the Truth Lies
- Stoned
- King Arthur
- Alexander
- Harry Potter and the Prisoner of Azkaban
- Die Another Day
- The Mummy Returns
- Sleepy Hollow
- The Mummy
- Star Wars: Episode I – The Phantom Menace
- Mortal Kombat
- The Saint
- The Fifth Element
- GoldenEye
- Wind in the Willows
- Judge Dredd
- Restoration
- Batman
- High Spirits
- The Adventures of Baron Munchausen
- The Princess Bride
- Willow
- Highlander
- Greystoke - The Legend of Tarzan, Lord of the Apes
- Little Shop of Horrors
- Brazil
- The Dark Crystal
- Young Sherlock Holmes
- Return of the Jedi
- Indiana Jones and the Temple of Doom
- Raiders of the Lost Ark
- Saturn 3
- Life of Brian
- Alien

== See also ==
- Brian Muir
