= New York Film Critics Online Awards 2006 =

Annual US film awards ceremony

6th NYFCCO Awards

December 11, 2006

Best Film:
The Queen

The 6th New York Film Critics Online Awards, honoring the best in filmmaking in 2006, were given on 11 December 2006.

== Top 10 Films ==
(in alphabetical order)

- Babel
- The Fountain
- Inland Empire
- Pan's Labyrinth (El laberinto del fauno)
- Little Children
- Little Miss Sunshine
- The Queen
- Thank You for Smoking
- Volver
- Water

== Winners ==
- Best Actor:
  - Forest Whitaker - The Last King of Scotland as Idi Amin
- Best Actress:
  - Helen Mirren - The Queen as Elizabeth II
- Best Animated Film:
  - Happy Feet
- Best Cast:
  - Little Miss Sunshine
- Best Cinematography:
  - The Illusionist - Dick Pope
- Best Debut Director:
  - Jonathan Dayton and Valerie Faris - Little Miss Sunshine
- Best Director:
  - Stephen Frears - The Queen
- Best Documentary Film:
  - An Inconvenient Truth
- Best Film:
  - The Queen
- Best Film Score:
  - The Illusionist - Philip Glass
- Best Foreign Language Film:
  - Pan's Labyrinth (El laberinto del fauno) • Mexico
- Best Screenplay:
  - The Queen - Peter Morgan
- Best Supporting Actor:
  - Michael Sheen - The Queen as Tony Blair
- Best Supporting Actress: (tie)
  - Jennifer Hudson - Dreamgirls as Effie White
  - Catherine O'Hara - For Your Consideration as Marilyn Hack
- Breakthrough Performer:
  - Jennifer Hudson - Dreamgirls

Preceded by NYFCO Awards 2005 (5th)	New York Film Critics Online Awards; 2006	Succeeded by NYFCO Awards 2007 (7th)
