= New York Film Critics Online Awards 2011 =

Annual US film awards ceremony

11th NYFCO Awards

December 11, 2011

Best Film:
The Artist

The 11th New York Film Critics Online Awards, honoring the best in filmmaking in 2011, were given on 11 December 2011.

== Winners ==
- Best Actor:
  - Michael Shannon - Take Shelter
- Best Actress:
  - Meryl Streep - The Iron Lady
- Best Animated Film:
  - The Adventures of Tintin: The Secret of the Unicorn
- Best Cast:
  - Bridesmaids
- Best Cinematography:
  - The Tree of Life - Emmanuel Lubezki
- Best Debut Director:
  - Joe Cornish - Attack the Block
- Best Director:
  - Michel Hazanavicius - The Artist
- Best Documentary Film:
  - Cave of Forgotten Dreams
- Best Film:
  - The Artist
- Best Film Music or Score:
  - The Artist - Ludovic Bource
- Best Foreign Language Film:
  - A Separation • Iran
- Best Screenplay:
  - The Descendants - Nat Faxon, Jim Rash and Alexander Payne
- Best Supporting Actor:
  - Albert Brooks - Drive
- Best Supporting Actress:
  - Melissa McCarthy - Bridesmaids
- Breakthrough Performer:
  - Jessica Chastain - The Tree of Life, The Help, The Debt, Take Shelter, Texas Killing Fields and Coriolanus

=== Top Pictures of 2011 ===
- The Artist
- The Descendants
- Drive
- The Help
- Hugo
- Melancholia
- Midnight in Paris
- Take Shelter
- The Tree of Life
- War Horse

Preceded by NYFCO Awards 2010	New York Film Critics Online Awards; 2011	Succeeded by NYFCO Awards 2012
