= New York Film Critics Online Awards 2008 =

Annual US film awards ceremony

8th NYFCCO Awards

December 15, 2008

Best Film:
Slumdog Millionaire

The 8th New York Film Critics Online Awards, honoring the best in filmmaking in 2008, were given on 15 December 2008.

== Top 10 films ==
(in alphabetical order)

- Che
- A Christmas Tale (Un conte de Noël)
- The Curious Case of Benjamin Button
- The Dark Knight
- Happy-Go-Lucky
- Milk
- Rachel Getting Married
- Slumdog Millionaire
- WALL-E
- The Wrestler

== Winners ==
- Best Actor:
  - Sean Penn – Milk as Harvey Milk
- Best Actress:
  - Sally Hawkins – Happy-Go-Lucky as Pauline "Poppy" Cross
- Best Animated Film:
  - WALL-E
- Best Cast:
  - Milk
- Best Cinematography
  - Slumdog Millionaire – Anthony Dod Mantle
- Best Debut Director:
  - Martin McDonagh – In Bruges
- Best Director:
  - Danny Boyle & Loveleen Tandan – Slumdog Millionaire
- Best Documentary Film:
  - Man on Wire
- Best Film:
  - Slumdog Millionaire
- Best Film Music or Score:
  - Slumdog Millionaire – A. R. Rahman
- Best Foreign Language Film:
  - 4 Months, 3 Weeks and 2 Days (4 luni, 3 saptamani si 2 zile) • Romania
- Best Screenplay:
  - Simon Beaufoy – Slumdog Millionaire
- Best Supporting Actor:
  - Heath Ledger – The Dark Knight as The Joker posthumously
- Best Supporting Actress:
  - Penélope Cruz – Vicky Cristina Barcelona as María Elena
- Breakthrough Performer:
  - Sally Hawkins – Happy-Go-Lucky

Preceded by NYFCO Awards 2007 (7th)	New York Film Critics Online Awards; 2008	Succeeded by NYFCO Awards 2009 (9th)
