= New York Film Critics Online Awards 2014 =

Annual US film awards ceremony

14th NYFCO Awards

December 7, 2014

Best Film:
Boyhood

The 14th New York Film Critics Online Awards, honoring the best in filmmaking in 2014, were given on December 7, 2014.

== Winners ==
- Best Film:
  - Boyhood
- Best Director:
  - Richard Linklater – Boyhood
- Best Actor:
  - Eddie Redmayne – The Theory of Everything
- Best Actress:
  - Marion Cotillard – Two Days, One Night
- Best Supporting Actor:
  - J.K. Simmons – Whiplash
- Best Supporting Actress:
  - Patricia Arquette – Boyhood
- Best Screenplay:
  - Birdman or (The Unexpected Virtue of Ignorance) – Amando Bo, Alexander Dinelaris, Nicolas Giacobone, and Alejandro G. Inarritu
- Best Animated Film:
  - The Lego Movie
- Best Documentary Film:
  - Life Itself
- Best Ensemble Cast:
  - Birdman or (The Unexpected Virtue of Ignorance)
- Best Cinematography:
  - Birdman or (The Unexpected Virtue of Ignorance) – Emmanuel Lubezki
- Best Debut Director:
  - Dan Gilroy – Nightcrawler
- Best Film Music or Score:
  - Get On Up – Thomas Newman
- Best Foreign Language Film:
  - Two Days, One Night • Belgium
- Breakthrough Performer:
  - Jack O'Connell – Unbroken, Starred Up
- Top Ten Pictures:
  - Birdman or (The Unexpected Virtue of Ignorance)
  - Boyhood
  - Guardians of the Galaxy
  - The Imitation Game
  - A Most Violent Year
  - Mr. Turner
  - Selma
  - The Theory of Everything
  - Under the Skin
  - Whiplash

Preceded by NYFCO Awards 2013	New York Film Critics Online Awards; 2014	Succeeded by
