= Boston Society of Film Critics Awards 1999 =

Annual US film awards ceremony

20th BSFC Awards

December 12, 1999

Best Film:
Three Kings

The 20th Boston Society of Film Critics Awards honored the best films of 1999. The awards were given on 12 December 1999.

== Winners ==
- Best Film:
  - Three Kings
- Best Actor:
  - Jim Carrey – Man on the Moon
- Best Actress:
  - Hilary Swank – Boys Don't Cry
- Best Supporting Actor:
  - Christopher Plummer – The Insider
- Best Supporting Actress:
  - Chloë Sevigny – Boys Don't Cry
- Best Director:
  - David O. Russell – Three Kings
- Best Screenplay:
  - Charlie Kaufman – Being John Malkovich
- Best Cinematography:
  - Emmanuel Lubezki – Sleepy Hollow
- Best Documentary:
  - Hands on a Hard Body: The Documentary
- Best Foreign-Language Film:
  - All About My Mother (Todo sobre mi madre) • Spain/France
- Best New Filmmaker:
  - Kimberly Peirce – Boys Don't Cry
