= Sleepy Hollow (film) =

1999 film by Tim Burton

- Theatrical release poster
- Directed by: Tim Burton
- Screenplay by: Andrew Kevin Walker
- Story by: Kevin Yagher; Andrew Kevin Walker
- Based on: "The Legend of Sleepy Hollow" by Washington Irving
- Produced by: Scott Rudin; Adam Schroeder
- Starring: Johnny Depp; Christina Ricci; Miranda Richardson; Michael Gambon; Casper Van Dien; Jeffrey Jones
- Cinematography: Emmanuel Lubezki
- Edited by: Chris Lebenzon
- Music by: Danny Elfman
- Production companies: Mandalay Pictures; Scott Rudin Productions; American Zoetrope; Tim Burton Productions
- Distributed by: Paramount Pictures (Note: Distributed in Germany by Constantin Film and in other territories by Summit Entertainment)
- Release dates: November 17, 1999 (Mann's Chinese Theatre); November 19, 1999 (United States)
- Running time: 105 minutes
- Countries: Germany; United States
- Language: English
- Budget: $70–100 million
- Box office: $207 million

Sleepy Hollow is a 1999 Gothic supernatural horror film directed by Tim Burton from a screenplay by Andrew Kevin Walker. Co-produced by Paramount Pictures, Mandalay Pictures, Scott Rudin Productions, American Zoetrope, and Tim Burton Productions, it is based on Washington Irving's 1820 short story "The Legend of Sleepy Hollow", and stars Johnny Depp and Christina Ricci, with Miranda Richardson, Michael Gambon, Casper Van Dien, and Jeffrey Jones in supporting roles. The plot follows New York City police constable Ichabod Crane (Depp), who is sent to investigate a series of brutal murders in the upstate village of Sleepy Hollow, where he becomes romantically involved with Katrina Van Tassel (Ricci), the daughter of the richest resident of the town (Gambon).

Sleepy Hollow began development in 1993 at Paramount Pictures, with Kevin Yagher originally set to direct Andrew Kevin Walker's script as a low-budget slasher film. Disagreements with Paramount resulted in Yagher being demoted to prosthetic makeup designer, and Burton was hired to direct in June 1998. Filming took place from November 1998 to May 1999. The film was an international co-production between Germany and the United States.

Sleepy Hollow had its world premiere at Mann's Chinese Theatre on November 17, 1999, and was released in the United States on November 19, by Paramount Pictures. It received positive reviews from critics, and grossed $207 million. It won the Academy Award for Best Art Direction.

== Plot ==
In the fall of 1799, pragmatic New York City constable Ichabod Crane is sent to the upstate Dutch village of Sleepy Hollow to investigate a series of brutal decapitations of its residents, which included landowner Peter Van Garrett, his son Dirk, and widow Emily Winship. Received by the insular town elders—wealthy farmer Baltus Van Tassel; doctor Thomas Lancaster; the Reverend Steenwyck; notary James Hardenbrook; and magistrate Samuel Philipse—Ichabod learns that the locals believe the killer is the undead apparition of a headless Hessian mercenary, who is trying to find his missing head.

Skeptical of the paranormal explanation, Ichabod begins his investigation and settles in the house of the Van Tassels, becoming romantically attached to Baltus' spiritual daughter, Katrina. After Van Garrett's servant, Jonathan Masbath, becomes the next victim, his teenage son volunteers as Ichabod's assistant. On a tip from Philipse, Ichabod and Young Masbath exhume the bodies of the victims and learn that the widow died pregnant. Shortly afterwards, Ichabod witnesses the Hessian killing Philipse. Together with Masbath and Katrina, Ichabod goes to the Western Woods, where a crone reveals the location of the Hessian's grave at the "tree of the dead", his portal into the living world. Ichabod digs up the grave and discovers the Hessian's remains without a skull, deducing that it has been taken in order to control him.

That night, the Hessian kills town midwife Beth Killian and her family, as well as Katrina's suitor, Brom Van Brunt, when he attempts to intervene. Ichabod hypothesizes that the Hessian is attacking selected targets linked by a conspiracy. Ichabod and Masbath visit Hardenbrook, who unwittingly reveals that Van Garrett had secretly married Winship, bequeathing his estate to her and her unborn child. Ichabod deduces that all the victims are either beneficiaries or witnesses to the new will, and assumes that the Hessian's master is Baltus, Van Garret's next of kin who would otherwise have inherited the estate. Ichabod finds a chalked pentagram under his bed, which he believes symbolizes the evil eye.

Upon learning of Ichabod's suspicions, Katrina destroys his evidence to protect her father. Hardenbrook commits suicide, and Steenwyck convenes a meeting to discredit Ichabod, but Baltus bursts into the church assembly, announcing that the Hessian has killed his wife and Katrina's stepmother, Mary Van Tassel. The remaining elders turn on each other, resulting in Steenwyck and Lancaster being killed. Unable to enter the church, the Hessian harpoons Baltus through a window, dragging him out and acquiring his head. In the ensuing chaos, Katrina draws a pentagram identical to the one Ichabod found earlier, making him believe that she is the Hessian's master.

Using Katrina's compendium of charms, Ichabod discovers that her pentagram is actually one of protection; he also finds a post-mortem wound on Mary's supposed body, which belongs to the Van Tassels' servant, Sarah. Mary confronts Katrina and takes her to a windmill, where she reveals her true parentage from an impoverished family evicted by Van Garrett years earlier in favor of the Van Tassels. Having witnessed the Hessian's death as a child, Mary pledged herself to Satan to resurrect him from the grave and take over the Van Garrett and Van Tassel estates in revenge. She manipulated her way into the Van Tassel household, killing Katrina's mother to take her place as Baltus' wife, and drew the other elders into the conspiracy against him through blackmail and lust.

Having eliminated all the other heirs and witnesses, including her own sister (the crone) for aiding Ichabod, Mary summons the Hessian to finish off Katrina. Ichabod and Masbath rush to the windmill to rescue Katrina as the Hessian arrives. After escaping from the windmill, which led to its destruction, and the subsequent chase to the tree of the dead, Ichabod retrieves the Hessian's skull from Mary and returns it to him, freeing the Hessian from her control. With his head restored, the Hessian spares Katrina and returns to Hell, taking Mary with him. With the case solved, Ichabod takes Katrina and Masbath away from Sleepy Hollow to start a new life with them in New York.

== Cast ==
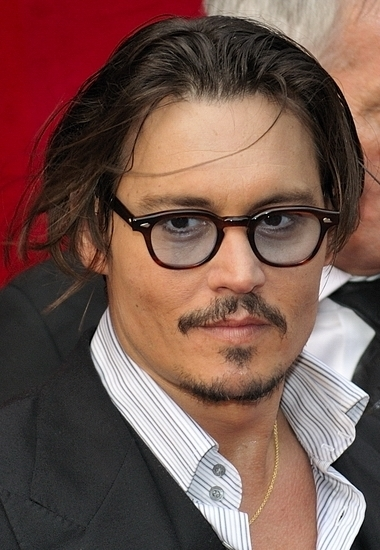
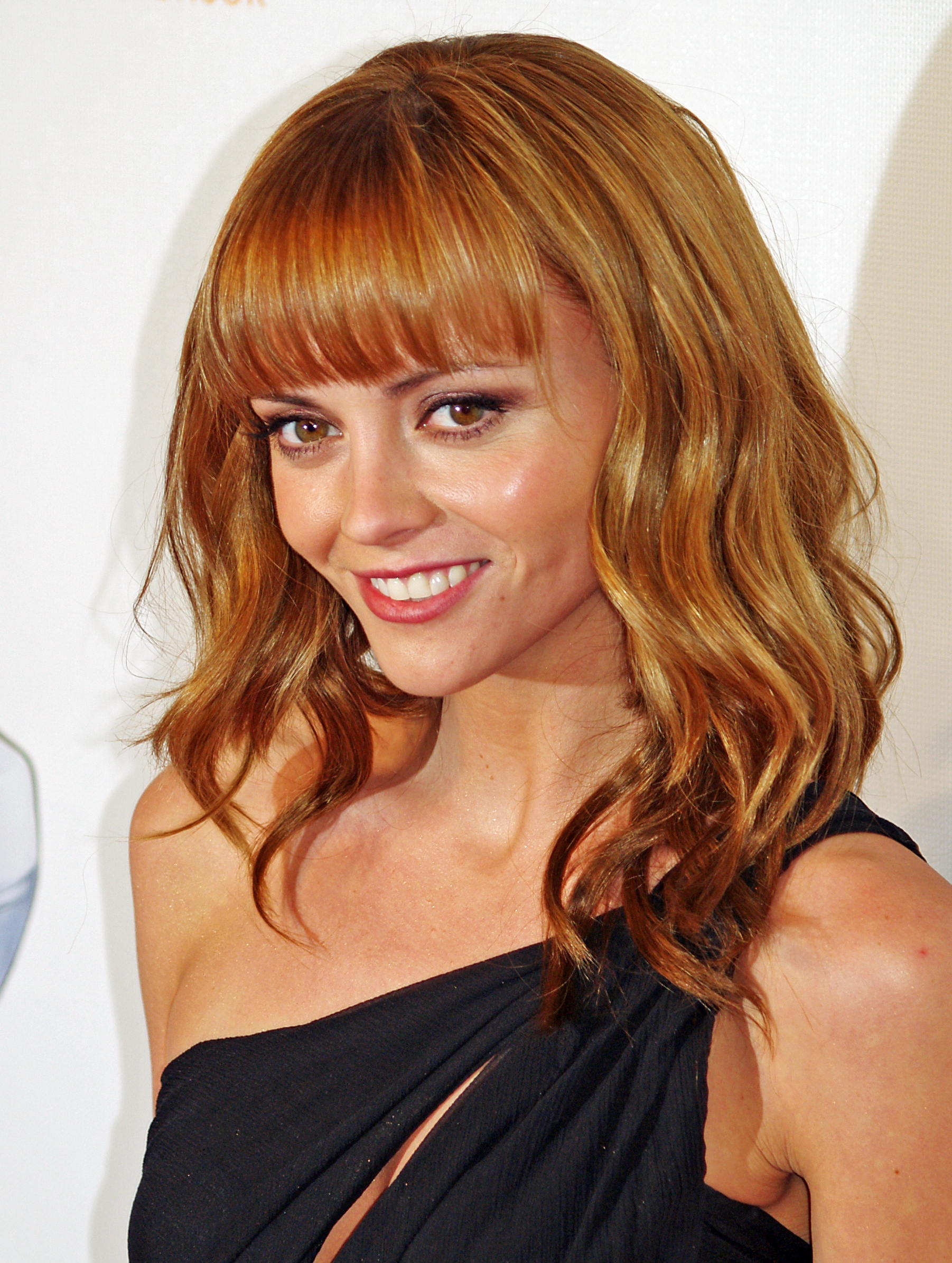
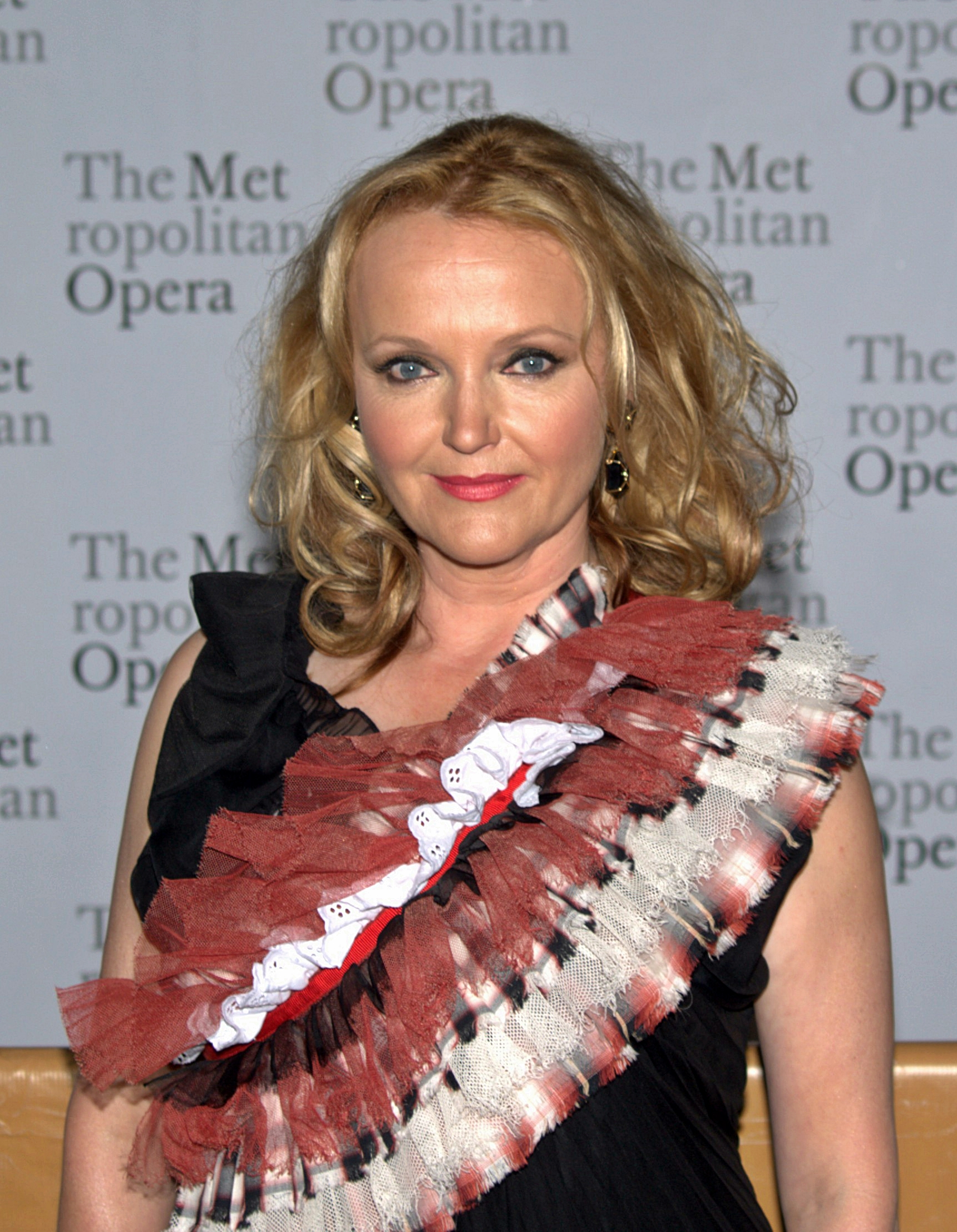
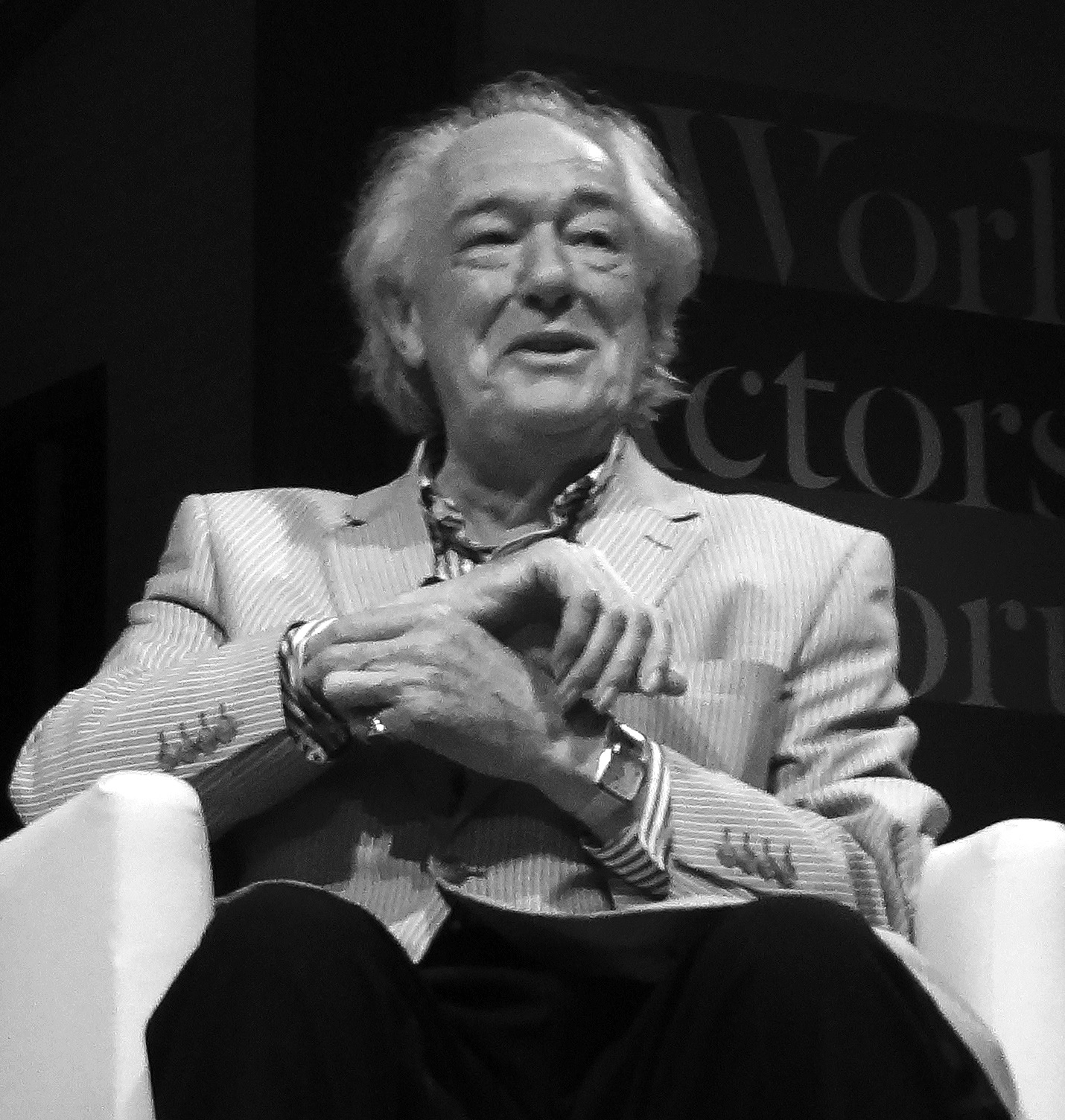
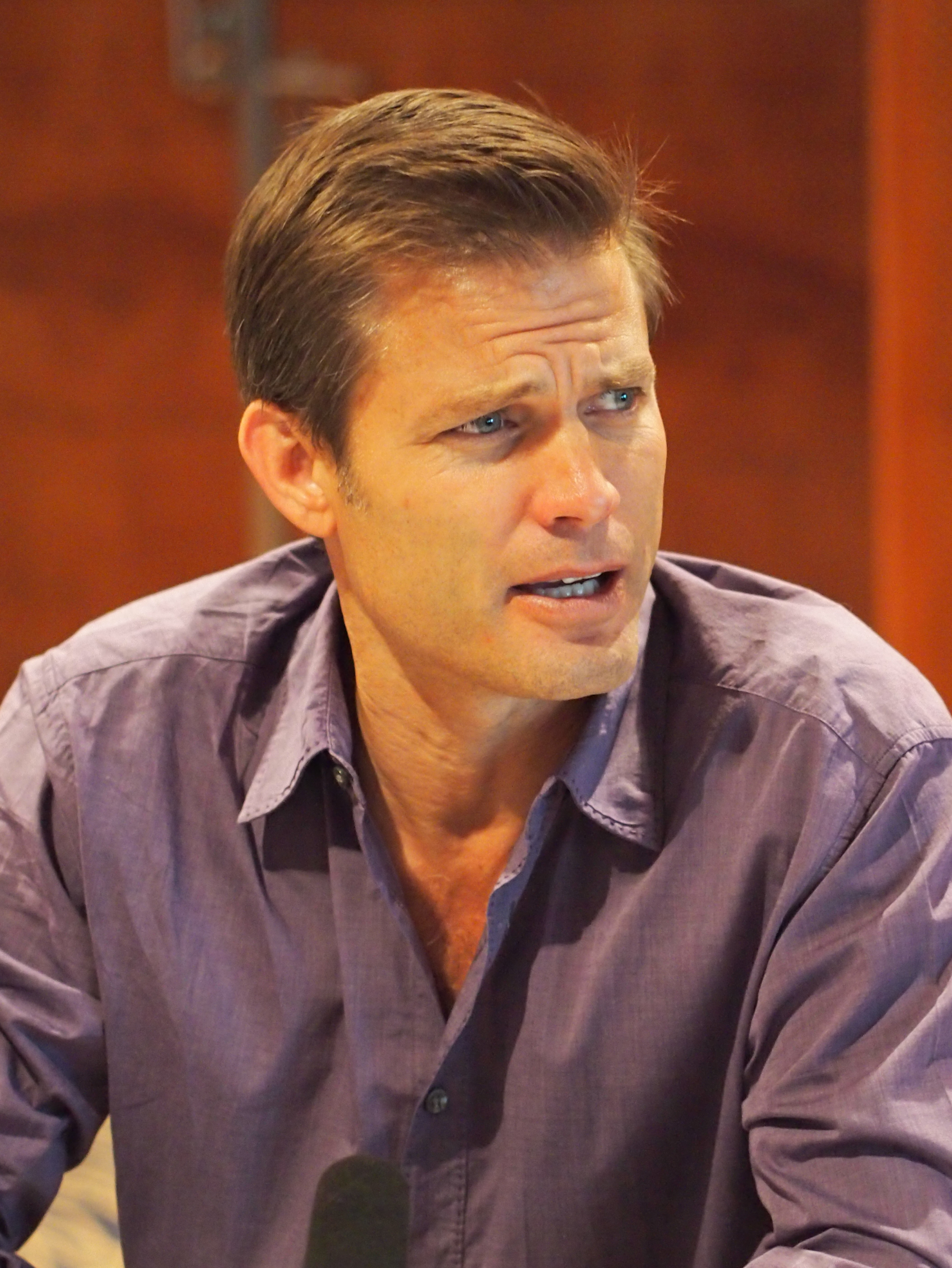
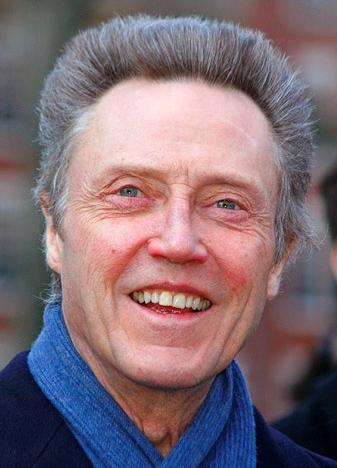
Top row: Johnny Depp, Christina Ricci, and Miranda Richardson play Ichabod Crane, Katrina Van Tassel, and Lady Van Tassel.
Bottom row: Michael Gambon, Casper Van Dien, and Christopher Walken play Baltus Van Tassel, Brom Van Brunt, and the Hessian Horseman.
- Johnny Depp as Ichabod Crane, an eccentric and earnest New York City constable infatuated with the idea of applying modern science and deduction to solve crimes. Depp described his character as "a very delicate, fragile person who was maybe a little too in touch with his feminine side, like a frightened little girl." Tim Burton elaborated that although the character of Ichabod has been changed from the original story, "there was a certain spirit of this sort of prissy, wimpy guy. He lives in his head but then he's forced to open up and become physical, not because he wants to but because he has to."
  - Sam Fior plays 7-year-old Ichabod.
- Christina Ricci as Katrina Anne Van Tassel, the strong‑willed and romantic daughter of the most affluent family in Sleepy Hollow, who becomes Ichabod's love interest. Ricci described her character as a "sort of like a fairy tale, a princess-y character, very one-sided, no emotional depth."
- Miranda Richardson as Lady Mary Van Tassel (née Archer), Baltus' manipulative second wife and Katrina's stepmother, who turns out to be the one controlling the Hessian
  - Richardson also portrays the Crone, Lady Van Tassel's witch sister living in the Western Woods.
  - Tessa Allen-Ridge and Cassandra Farndale play Lady Van Tassel and the Crone in their childhood, respectively.
- Michael Gambon as Baltus Van Tassel, Katrina's father, Lady Van Tassel's husband, and Sleepy Hollow's richest resident
- Casper Van Dien as Brom Van Brunt, Katrina's suitor who competes with Ichabod for her affections
- Jeffrey Jones as Reverend Steenwyck, the austere and corrupt town pastor
- Christopher Lee as the Burgomaster, a New York City police official who sends Ichabod to investigate the murders in Sleepy Hollow
- Richard Griffiths as Samuel Philipse, the drunken town magistrate
- Ian McDiarmid as Thomas Lancaster, the town doctor and surgeon
- Michael Gough as James Hardenbrook, the wizened and cowardly town notary
- Marc Pickering as Young Masbath, an orphaned 10-year-old boy who becomes Ichabod's assistant after his father is killed by the Hessian.
- Lisa Marie as Lady Crane, Ichabod's late mother who was tortured to death when he was a child. She appears in the flashbacks/nightmares that haunt Ichabod during his investigation.
- Steven Waddington as Killian, the father of a young family who aids Ichabod before becoming one of the Hessian's victims
- Christopher Walken as the Hessian Horseman, a brutal and sadistic Hessian mercenary sent to America during the American Revolutionary War who loses his head during battle
  - Rob Inch and Ray Park were Walken's stunt doubles as the Headless Horseman.

Additionally, Claire Skinner plays Elizabeth Killian, the town midwife. Alun Armstrong plays the High Constable. Mark Spalding plays Jonathan Masbath, Young Masbath's father and the Van Garretts' servant who becomes one of the Hessian's victims. Jessica Oyelowo plays Sarah, the Van Tassels' servant. Tony Maudsley plays Van Ripper. Peter Guinness plays Lord Crane, Ichabod's grim and tyrannical parson father, who murdered his wife when their son was a child. Sean Stephens plays Thomas Killian. Other roles include Michael Feast as Spotty Man, Jamie Foreman as the Thuggish Constable, Philip Martin Brown as a Constable, and an uncredited Martin Landau as Peter Van Garrett, Sleepy Hollow's chief citizen until his death at the hands of the Headless Horseman.

== Production ==
=== Development ===
In 1993, Kevin Yagher, a special make-up effects designer who had turned to directing with Tales from the Crypt, had the notion to adapt Washington Irving's short story "The Legend of Sleepy Hollow" into a feature film. Through his agent, Yagher was introduced to Andrew Kevin Walker; they spent a few months working on a film treatment that transformed Ichabod Crane from a schoolmaster from Connecticut to a banished New York City detective. Yagher and Walker subsequently pitched Sleepy Hollow to various studios and production companies, eventually securing a deal with producer Scott Rudin, who had been impressed with Walker's unproduced spec script for Seven. Rudin optioned the project to Paramount Pictures in a deal that had Yagher set to direct, with Walker scripting; the pair would share story credit. Following the completion of Hellraiser: Bloodline, Yagher had planned Sleepy Hollow as "a low-budget effects showcase with a spectacular murder every five minutes or so," characterized by its screenwriter as a "pretentious slasher movie". Paramount had reservations about the film, interpreting it as a typical period piece—"I wouldn't say they weren't enthusiastic about it, but they didn't see the commercial viability," producer Adam Schroeder noted. "The studio thinks 'old literary classic' and they think The Crucible. There was a fear about that... We started developing it before horror movies came back."

Paramount CEO Sherry Lansing revived studio interest in 1998. Schroeder, who shepherded Tim Burton's Edward Scissorhands as a studio executive at 20th Century Fox in 1990, suggested that Burton direct the film. Francis Ford Coppola's minimal production duties came from American Zoetrope; Burton only became aware of Coppola's involvement during the editing process when he was sent a copy of Sleepy Hollow's trailer and saw Coppola's name on it. Burton, coming off the troubled production of Superman Lives, was hired to direct in June 1998. Excited about Burton's involvement, Yagher stepped down as director "with good grace", remaining involved in the project as the lead creature effects artist. Burton considered the film his first venture into a primarily horror-focused tone. "I had never really done something that was more of a horror film," he explained, "and it's funny, because those are the kind of movies that I like probably more than any other genre." His interest in directing a horror film was influenced by his love for Hammer Film Productions and Black Sunday—particularly the supernatural feel they evoked as a result of being filmed primarily on sound stages. As a result, Sleepy Hollow is an homage to various Hammer Film Productions, including Dr. Jekyll and Sister Hyde, and other films such as Frankenstein, Bride of Frankenstein, various Roger Corman horror films, Jason and the Argonauts, and Scream Blacula Scream. The image of the Headless Horseman had fascinated Burton during his apprenticeship as a Disney animator at CalArts in the early 1980s. "One of my teachers had worked on the Walt Disney version as one of the layout artists on the pursuit, and he brought in some layouts from it, so that was exciting. It was one of the things that maybe shaped what I like to do." Burton worked with Walker on rewrites, but Rudin suggested that Tom Stoppard rewrite the script to add to the comical aspects of Ichabod's bumbling mannerisms, and emphasize the character's romance with Katrina. His work went uncredited through the WGA screenwriting credit system.

=== Casting ===
While Johnny Depp was Burton's first choice for the role of Ichabod Crane, Paramount required him to consider Brad Pitt, Liam Neeson and Daniel Day-Lewis. Depp was cast in July 1998 for his third collaboration with Burton after the title roles of Edward Scissorhands and Ed Wood. Depp wanted Ichabod to parallel Irving's description of the character in the short story. This included a long prosthetic snipe nose, huge ears, and elongated fingers. Paramount turned down his suggestions, and after Depp read Tom Stoppard's rewrite of the script, he was inspired to take the character even further. "I always thought of Ichabod as a very delicate, fragile person who was maybe a little too in touch with his feminine side, like a frightened little girl," Depp explained. He did not wish to portray the character as a typical action star would have, and instead took inspiration by Angela Lansbury's performance in Death on the Nile. "It's good," Burton reasoned, "because I'm not the greatest action director, or the greatest director in any genre, and he's not the greatest action star, or the greatest star in any genre." Depp modeled Ichabod's detective personality from Basil Rathbone in the 1939 Sherlock Holmes film series. He also studied Roddy McDowall's acting for additional influence. Burton added that "the idea was to try to find an elegance in action of the kind that Christopher Lee or Peter Cushing or Vincent Price had."

By late July 1998, Christina Ricci had been cast as Katrina Van Tassel in her first major adult role. Sleepy Hollow also reunited Burton with Jeffrey Jones (from Beetlejuice and Ed Wood) as Reverend Steenwyck, Christopher Walken (Max Shreck in Batman Returns) as the Hessian Horseman, Martin Landau (Ed Wood) in a cameo role, and Hammer veteran Michael Gough (Alfred in Burton's Batman films), whom Burton tempted out of retirement. The Hammer influence was further confirmed by the casting of Christopher Lee in a small role as the Burgomaster who sends Crane to Sleepy Hollow.

=== Filming ===
Supervised by Heinrichs, the town of Sleepy Hollow was constructed around a small duck pond. At a cost estimated at $1.3 million, and over a period of four months, 12 structures were built, several with detailed interiors, as well as exteriors.

The original intention had been to shoot Sleepy Hollow predominantly on location with a $30 million budget. Towns were scouted throughout Upstate New York along the Hudson Valley, and the filmmakers decided on Tarrytown for an October 1998 start date. The Historic Hudson Valley organization assisted in scouting locations, which included the Philipsburg Manor House and forests in the Rockefeller State Park Preserve. "They had a wonderful quality to them," production designer Rick Heinrichs reflected on the locations, "but it wasn't quite lending itself to the sort of expressionism that we were going for, which wanted to express the feeling of foreboding." Disappointed, the filmmakers scouted locations in Sturbridge, Massachusetts, and considered using Dutch colonial villages and period town recreations in the Northeastern United States. When no suitable existing location could be found, coupled with a lack of readily available studio space in the New York area needed to house the production's large number of sets, producer Scott Rudin suggested the United Kingdom.

Rudin believed Britain offered the level of craftsmanship in period detail, painting and costuming that was suitable for the film's design. Having directed Batman entirely in Britain, Burton agreed, and designers from Batman's art department were employed by Paramount for Sleepy Hollow. As a result, principal photography was pushed back to November 20, 1998, at Leavesden Film Studios, which had been recently vacated by Star Wars: Episode I – The Phantom Menace. The majority of filming took place at Leavesden, with other work taking place at Shepperton Studios, where the massive Tree of the Dead set was built using Stage H. Production then moved to the Culden Faw Estate, Hambleden for a month-long shoot in March, where the town of Sleepy Hollow was constructed. "We came to England figuring we would find a perfect little town," producer Adam Schroeder recalled, "and then we had to build it anyway." Filming in Britain continued through April, and a few last minute scenes were shot using a sound stage in Yonkers, New York the following May.

=== Design ===
The Tree of the Dead, designed by Keith Short

Responsible for the film's production design was Rick Heinrichs, whom Burton intended to use on Superman Lives. While the production crew was always going to build a substantial number of sets, the decision was made early on that optimally fulfilling Burton's vision would necessitate shooting Sleepy Hollow in a totally controlled environment at Leavesden Film Studios. The production design was influenced by Burton's love for Hammer Film Productions and the film Black Sunday (1960)—particularly the supernatural feel they evoked as a result of being filmed primarily on sound stages. Heinrichs was also influenced by American colonial architecture, German expressionist cinema, Dr. Seuss illustrations, and Hammer's Dracula Has Risen from the Grave.

One sound stage at Leavesden was dedicated to the "Forest to Field" set, for the scene in which the Headless Horseman races out of the woods and into a field. This stage was then transformed into, variously, a graveyard, a corn field, a field of harvested wheat, a churchyard, and a snowy battlefield. In addition, a small backlot area was devoted to a New York City street and waterfront tank.

==== Cinematography ====
Burton was impressed by the cinematography in Great Expectations (1998) and hired Emmanuel Lubezki as Sleepy Hollow's director of photography. Initially, Lubezki and Burton contemplated shooting the film in black and white, and in old square Academy ratio. When that proved unfeasible, they opted to apply bleach bypass to desaturate the image and increase the color black. Burton and Lubezki intentionally planned the over-dependency of smoke and soft lighting to accompany the film's sole wide-angle lens strategy. Lubezki also used Hammer horror and Mexican Luchador films from the 1960s, such as Santo Contra los Zombies and Santo vs. las Mujeres Vampiro. Lighting effects increased the dynamic energy of the Headless Horseman, while the contrast of the film stock was increased in post-production to add to the monochromatic feel.

Leavesden Studios, a converted airplane factory, presented problems because of its relatively low ceilings. This was less of an issue for The Phantom Menace, in which set height was generally achieved by digital means. "Our visual choices get channeled and violent," Heinrichs elaborated, "so you end up with liabilities that you tend to exploit as virtues. When you've got a certain ceiling height, and you're dealing with painted backings, you need to push atmosphere and diffusion." This was particularly the case in several exteriors that were built on sound stages. "We would mitigate the disadvantages by hiding lights with teasers and smoke."

==== Visual effects ====
The majority of Sleepy Hollow's 150 visual effects shots were handled by Industrial Light & Magic (ILM), while Kevin Yagher supervised the human and creature effects. Framestore also assisted on visual effects, and The Mill handled motion control photography. In part a reaction to the computer-generated effects in Mars Attacks!, Burton opted to use as limited an amount of digital effects as possible. Ray Park, who served as the Headless Horseman stunt double, wore a blue ski mask for the chroma key effect, digitally removed by ILM. Burton and Heinrichs applied to Sleepy Hollow many of the techniques they had used in stop-motion animation on Vincent—such as forced perspective sets.

The windmill was a 60-foot-tall forced-perspective exterior (visible to highway travellers miles away), a base and rooftop set and a quarter-scale miniature. The interior of the mill, which was about 30 feet high and 25 feet wide, featured wooden gears equipped with mechanisms for grinding flour. A wider view of the windmill was rendered on a Leavesden soundstage set with a quarter-scale windmill, complete with rotating vanes, painted sky backdrop and special-effects fire. "It was scary for the actors who were having burning wood explode at them," Heinrichs recalled. "There were controls in place and people standing by with hoses, of course, but there's always a chance of something going wrong." For the final shot of the burning mill exploding, the quarter-scale windmill and painted backdrop were erected against the outside wall of the "flight shed", a spacious hangar on the far side of Leavesden Studios. The hangar's interior walls were knocked down to create a 450-foot run, with a 40-foot width still allowing for coach and cameras. Heinrichs tailored the sets so cinematographer Emmanuel Lubezki could shoot from above without seeing the end of the stage.

Actor Ian McDiarmid, who portrayed Dr. Lancaster, had just finished another Leavesden production with Star Wars: Episode I – The Phantom Menace. He compared the aesthetics of the two films, stating that physical sets helped the actors get into a natural frame of mind. "Having come from the blue-screen world of Star Wars it was wonderful to see gigantic, beautifully made perspective sets and wonderful clothes, and also people recreating a world. It's like the way movies used to be done"

=== Musical score ===
The film score was composed by Danny Elfman. It won the Golden Satellite Award and was also nominated by the Las Vegas Film Critics.

== Release ==
=== Distribution ===
It is the first Mandalay Pictures film to be distributed by Paramount Pictures after they ended their collaboration with Sony Pictures Entertainment, they released the film in most territories through their joint venture company United International Pictures outside the United States. Pathé released the film in the United Kingdom, Ireland and France, Roadshow Films released the film in Australia and New Zealand, Village Films released the film in Greece and TriPictures released the film in Spain.

=== Marketing ===
To promote Sleepy Hollow, Paramount Pictures featured the film's trailer at San Diego Comic-Con in August 1999. The following October, the studio launched a website, which Variety described as being the "most ambitious online launch of a motion picture to date." The site offered visitors live video chats with several of the filmmakers hosted by Yahoo! Movies and enabled them to view photos from sets and behind-the-scenes footage. In the weeks before the movie's release, a toy line was marketed by McFarlane Toys. Simon & Schuster also published The Art of Sleepy Hollow (ISBN 0671036572), which included the film's screenplay and an introduction by Tim Burton. A novelization, also published by Simon & Schuster, was written by Peter Lerangis.

=== Box office ===
Sleepy Hollow was released in the United States on November 19, 1999, in 3,069 theaters, grossing $30,060,467 in its opening weekend at the No. 2 spot behind The World Is Not Enough. The film marked the highest opening weekend for Johnny Depp's career, a record that lasted for four years until Pirates of the Caribbean: The Curse of the Black Pearl surpassed it in 2003. It would drop into fourth place behind The World Is Not Enough, Toy Story 2 and End of Days the following weekend. Sleepy Hollow eventually earned $101,068,340 in domestic gross, and $105 million in foreign sales, coming to a worldwide total of $206,068,340.

=== Home media ===
Paramount Home Video first released Sleepy Hollow on DVD and VHS in the United States on May 23, 2000. The HD DVD release came in July 2006, while the film was released on Blu-ray two years later, in June 2008. An unofficial video game adaptation of the film titled Cursed Fates: The Headless Horseman was released by Fenomen Games and Big Fish Games on January 6, 2013. For the 20th anniversary, Paramount Home Entertainment released a Blu-ray digibook with a photobook containing the original story on September 24, 2019. For the upcoming 25th anniversary of the film, Paramount Pictures released a remastered 4K Ultra HD Blu-ray version on September 5, 2023.

== Reception ==
=== Critical response ===
Sleepy Hollow received positive reviews from critics, who praised its direction, screenplay, visual effects, musical score, and the performances of the cast. The review aggregator website Rotten Tomatoes reported that the film had a 71% approval rating based on 129 reviews, with an average rating of 6.4/10. According to its consensus, "It isn't Tim Burton's best work, but Sleepy Hollow entertains with its stunning visuals and creepy atmosphere." On Metacritic, the film has a weighted average score of 65 out of 100 from 35 reviews, indicating "generally favorable reviews". Audiences polled by CinemaScore gave the film a "B−" grade on a scale of A+ to F.

Roger Ebert gave it 3.5 stars out of 4 and said: "This is the best-looking horror film since Coppola's Bram Stoker's Dracula". He praised Johnny Depp's performance and Tim Burton's methods of visual design. "Johnny Depp is an actor able to disappear into characters," Ebert continued, "never more readily than in one of Burton's films." Richard Corliss wrote, in his review for Time, "Burton's richest, prettiest, weirdest [film] since Batman Returns. The simple story bends to his twists, freeing him for an exercise in high style." David Sterritt of The Christian Science Monitor gave praise to filmmaking and the high-spirited acting of cast, but believed Andrew Kevin Walker's writing was too repetitious and formulaic for the third act.

Owen Gleiberman from Entertainment Weekly wrote Sleepy Hollow is "a choppily plotted crowd-pleaser that lacks the seductive, freakazoid alchemy of Burton's best work." Gleiberman compared the film to The Mummy, and said "it feels like every high-powered action climax of the last 10 years. Personally, I'd rather see Burton so intoxicated by a movie that he lost his head." Andrew Johnston of Time Out New York wrote "[l]ike the best of Burton's films, Sleepy Hollow takes place in a world so richly imagined that, despite its abundant terrors, you can't help wanting to step through the screen." Mick LaSalle, writing in the San Francisco Chronicle, criticized Burton's perceived image as a creative artist. "All Sleepy Hollow has going for it is art direction, and even in that it falls back on cliché."

Jonathan Rosenbaum from the Chicago Reader called Sleepy Hollow "a ravishing visual experience, a pretty good vehicle for some talented American and English actors," but concluded that the film was a missed opportunity to depict an actual representation of the short story. "Burton's fidelity is exclusively to the period feeling he gets from disreputable Hammer horror films and a few images culled from Ichabod and Mr. Toad. When it comes to one of America's great stories, Burton obviously couldn't care less."

== Accolades ==
Awards
Award	Date of ceremony	Category	Recipients	Result
Academy Awards	March 26, 2000	Best Art Direction	Rick Heinrichs, Peter Young	Won
Academy Awards	March 26, 2000	Best Cinematography	Emmanuel Lubezki	Nominated
Academy Awards	March 26, 2000	Best Costume Design	Colleen Atwood	Nominated
British Academy Film Awards	April 9, 2000	Best Production Design	Rick Heinrichs	Won
British Academy Film Awards	April 9, 2000	Best Costume Design	Colleen Atwood	Won
British Academy Film Awards	April 9, 2000	Best Visual Effects	Jim Mitchell, Kevin Yagher, Joss Williams, Paddy Eason	Nominated
Academy of Science Fiction, Fantasy and Horror Films	June 6, 2000	Best Horror Film	Scott Rudin, Adam Schroeder	Nominated
Academy of Science Fiction, Fantasy and Horror Films	June 6, 2000	Best Director	Tim Burton	Nominated
Academy of Science Fiction, Fantasy and Horror Films	June 6, 2000	Best Writing	Andrew Kevin Walker	Nominated
Academy of Science Fiction, Fantasy and Horror Films	June 6, 2000	Best Actor	Johnny Depp	Nominated
Academy of Science Fiction, Fantasy and Horror Films	June 6, 2000	Best Actress	Christina Ricci	Won
Academy of Science Fiction, Fantasy and Horror Films	June 6, 2000	Best Supporting Actor	Christopher Walken	Nominated
Academy of Science Fiction, Fantasy and Horror Films	June 6, 2000	Best Supporting Actress	Miranda Richardson	Nominated
Academy of Science Fiction, Fantasy and Horror Films	June 6, 2000	Best Music	Danny Elfman	Won
Academy of Science Fiction, Fantasy and Horror Films	June 6, 2000	Best Costume	Colleen Atwood	Nominated
Academy of Science Fiction, Fantasy and Horror Films	June 6, 2000	Best Make-up	Kevin Yagher, Peter Owen	Nominated
Academy of Science Fiction, Fantasy and Horror Films	June 6, 2000	Best Special Effects	Jim Mitchell, Kevin Yagher, Joss Williams, Paddy Eason	Nominated
American Society of Cinematographers	February 20, 2000	Outstanding Achievement in Cinematography	Emmanuel Lubezki	Nominated
Art Directors Guild	February 8, 2000	Excellence in Production Design for a Feature Film	Rick Heinrichs, Les Tompkins, John Dexter, Kevin Phipps, John Wright Stevens, Ken Court, Andrew Nicholson, Bill Hoes, Julian Ashby, Gary Tompkins, Nick Navarro	Won
Awards Circuit Community Awards	1999	Best Art Direction	Rick Heinrichs	Won
Awards Circuit Community Awards	1999	Best Costume Design	Colleen Atwood	Won
Awards Circuit Community Awards	1999	Best Sound		Nominated
Awards Circuit Community Awards	1999	Best Visual Effects		Nominated
BMI Film & Television Awards	December 8, 2014	BMI Film Music Award	Danny Elfman	Won
Blockbuster Entertainment Awards	May 9, 2000	Favorite Actor – Horror	Johnny Depp	Won
Blockbuster Entertainment Awards	May 9, 2000	Favorite Actress – Horror	Christina Ricci	Won
Blockbuster Entertainment Awards	May 9, 2000	Favorite Supporting Actress – Horror	Miranda Richardson	Won
Blockbuster Entertainment Awards	May 9, 2000	Favorite Supporting Actor – Horror	Marc Pickering	Nominated
Boston Society of Film Critics Awards	December 12, 1999	Best Cinematography	Emmanuel Lubezki	Won
Chicago Film Critics Association	March 13, 2000	Best Cinematography	Emmanuel Lubezki	Nominated
Costume Designers Guild	February 25, 2000	Excellence in Period/Fantasy Film	Colleen Atwood	Won
Hollywood Makeup Artist and Hair Stylist Guild Awards	March 19, 2000	Best Character Makeup – Feature	Kevin Yagher, Peter Owen, Liz Tagg, Paul Gooch	Won
International Film Music Critics Association	February 23, 2012	Best Archival Release of an Existing Score	Danny Elfman (also for Pee-wee's Big Adventure, Beetlejuice, Batman, Edward Scissorhands, The Nightmare Before Christmas, Big Fish, Charlie and the Chocolate Factory, Corpse Bride and Alice in Wonderland)	Won
International Film Music Critics Association	February 4, 1999	Film Score of the Year	Danny Elfman	Nominated
International Horror Guild	May 12, 2000	Best Film		Nominated
Italian National Syndicate of Film Journalists	May 12, 2000	Best Foreign Director	Tim Burton	Nominated
Las Vegas Film Critics Society Awards	January 18, 2000	Best Score	Danny Elfman	Nominated
Las Vegas Film Critics Society Awards	January 18, 2000	Best Cinematography	Emmanuel Lubezki	Nominated
Las Vegas Film Critics Society Awards	January 18, 2000	Best Costume Design	Colleen Atwood	Nominated
Las Vegas Film Critics Society Awards	January 18, 2000	Best Production Design	Rick Heinrichs	Won
Los Angeles Film Critics Association Awards	December 12, 1999	Best Production Design	Rick Heinrichs	Won
MTV Movie Awards	June 5, 2000	Best Villain	Christopher Walken	Nominated
Motion Picture Sound Editors	December 15, 1999	Best Sound Editing – Effects & Foley	Skip Lievsay, Thomas W. Small, Sean Garnhart, Lewis Goldstein, Paul Urmson, Craig Berkey, Richard L. Anderson, John Pospisil, Michael Dressel, Scott Curtis, Matthew Harrison, Tammy Fearing	Nominated
National Society of Film Critics	January 8, 2000	Best Cinematography	Emmanuel Lubezki	Nominated
New York Film Critics Circle Awards	January 9, 2000	Best Cinematographer	Emmanuel Lubezki	Runner-up
Online Film & Television Association	January 12, 2000	Best Original Score	Danny Elfman	Nominated
Online Film & Television Association	January 12, 2000	Best Cinematography	Emmanuel Lubezki	Nominated
Online Film & Television Association	January 12, 2000	Best Production Design	Rick Heinrichs, Ken Court, John Dexter, Andy Nicholson, Kevin Phipps, Leslie Tomkins, Peter Young	Won
Online Film & Television Association	January 12, 2000	Best Costume Design	Colleen Atwood	Nominated
Online Film & Television Association	January 12, 2000	Best Makeup and Hairstyling	Kevin Yagher, Peter Owen, Liz Tagg, Paul Gooch, Susan Parkinson, Bernadette Mazur, Tamsin Dorling	Nominated
Online Film & Television Association	January 12, 2000	Best Sound Mixing	Lee Dichter, Robert Fernandez, Skip Lievsay, Frank Morrone	Nominated
Online Film & Television Association	January 12, 2000	Best Sound Effects	Skip Lievsay	Nominated
Online Film & Television Association	January 12, 2000	Best Visual Effects	James Mitchell, Kevin Yagher, Joss Williams, Paddy Eason	Nominated
Online Film & Television Association	January 12, 2000	Best Official Film Website	www.sleepyhollow.com	Nominated
Online Film Critics Society	January 2, 2000	Best Cinematography	Emmanuel Lubezki	Won
Santa Fe Film Critics Circle Awards	January 9, 2000	Best Cinematography	Emmanuel Lubezki	Won
Satellite Awards	January 16, 2000	Best Actor – Musical or Comedy	Johnny Depp	Nominated
Satellite Awards	January 16, 2000	Best Original Score	Danny Elfman	Won
Satellite Awards	January 16, 2000	Best Cinematography	Emmanuel Lubezki	Won
Satellite Awards	January 16, 2000	Best Art Direction	Ken Court, John Dexter, Rick Heinrichs and Andy Nicholson	Won
Satellite Awards	January 16, 2000	Best Costume Design	Colleen Atwood	Won
Satellite Awards	January 16, 2000	Best Editing	Chris Lebenzon	Nominated
Satellite Awards	January 16, 2000	Best Sound	Gary Alpers, Skip Lievsay, Frank Morrone	Won
Satellite Awards	January 16, 2000	Best Visual Effects	Jim Mitchell, Joss Williams	Nominated
Teen Choice Awards	August 6, 2000	Film – Choice Actress	Christina Ricci	Nominated
Young Artist Award	March 19, 2000	Best Performance in a Feature Film: Leading Young Actress	Christina Ricci	Nominated

- AFI's 100 Years...100 Thrills – Nominated
- AFI's 100 Years...100 Heroes & Villains:
  - Headless Horseman – Nominated Villain

== Legacy ==
On June 10, 2022, Paramount announced plans for a feature film reboot with Lindsey Beer in talks to serve as writer and director.

In July 2025, it was announced that IDW Publishing would be producing a comic sequel titled Return to Sleepy Hollow, scripted by Casey Gilley and illustrated by Savanna Mayer, and the first issue was released three months later. In May 2026, IDW released the first issue of a five-issue comic book prequel to the film entitled The Witches of the Western Wood, written by Delilah S. Dawson and featuring art by Jose Jaro.

== See also ==
- Sleepy Hollow (TV series)
- List of ghost films

== Bibliography ==
- Burton, Tim (2006). Salisbury, Mark (ed.). Burton on Burton. Faber and Faber. ISBN 978-0571229260.
- Walker, Andrew Kevin (1999). The Art of Sleepy Hollow. Pocket Books. ISBN 978-0671036577.
