= Emmanuel Lubezki =

Mexican cinematographer

- Born: Emmanuel Lubezki Morgenstern; November 30, 1964 (age 61); Mexico City, Mexico
- Other name: Chivo
- Education: National Autonomous University of Mexico
- Occupation: Cinematographer
- Years active: 1983–present
- Organization(s): Mexican Society of Cinematographers; American Society of Cinematographers
- Relatives: Daniel Lubetzky (cousin)
- Awards: Full list

Emmanuel Lubezki Morgenstern (Spanish pronunciation: [emaˈnwel luˈβeski]; born November 30, 1964) is a Mexican cinematographer. Lubezki is known for uses of natural lighting and continuous uninterrupted shots in cinematography, often utilizing a Steadicam, a 3-axis gimbal, or hand-held camera. He is also known for his frequent collaborations with Terrence Malick, Alfonso Cuarón, and Alejandro González Iñárritu.

He has received numerous accolades including three consecutive wins for the Academy Award for Best Cinematography for the science fiction thriller Gravity (2013), the dark comedy Birdman (2014), and the epic western The Revenant (2015). He was Oscar-nominated for his work on A Little Princess (1995), Sleepy Hollow (1999), The New World (2005), Children of Men (2006), and The Tree of Life (2011).

Lubezki is a member of both the Mexican Society of Cinematographers and the American Society of Cinematographers. Lubezki won the Royal Photographic Society Lumière Award for major achievement in cinematography, video or animation in 2016.

== Early life and education ==
Lubezki was born to a Jewish family in Mexico City, Mexico. His father was actor and producer Muni Lubezki. His paternal grandfather is Lithuanian Jewish while his grandmother is also Jewish, from Russia. Lubezki studied film at Mexico's Centro Universitario de Estudios Cinematográficos (CUEC), where he met Alfonso Cuarón. Lubezki is the cousin of billionaire businessman Daniel Lubetzky.

== Career ==
Lubezki began his career in Mexican film and television productions in the late 1980s. His first international production was the 1993 independent film Twenty Bucks.

Lubezki is a frequent collaborator with fellow Mexican filmmaker Alfonso Cuarón. The two have been friends since they were teenagers and attended the same film school at the National Autonomous University of Mexico. Together they have worked on six motion pictures: Sólo Con Tu Pareja, A Little Princess, Great Expectations, Y Tu Mamá También, Children of Men, and Gravity.

His work with Cuarón on Children of Men was praised for utilizing a number of new technologies and distinctive techniques. The "roadside ambush" scene was shot in one extended take utilizing a special camera rig invented by Doggicam systems, developed from the company's Power Slide system. For the scene, a vehicle was modified to enable seats to tilt and lower actors out of the way of the camera. The windshield of the car was designed to tilt out of the way to allow camera movement in and out through the front windscreen. A crew of four, including Lubezki, rode on the roof. Children of Men also features a seven-and-a-half-minute battle sequence composed of roughly five seamless edits.

Lubezki won his first Academy Award for Best Cinematography for his work on Cuarón's Gravity, a thriller set in outer space. The film was praised for the way it combined two shots through digital backgrounds of space to create the illusion of scenes done in a single shot. Lubezki won his second Academy Award in the following year for his work on Alejandro González Iñárritu's Birdman. The film used a similar technique from Gravity, being very unusual in the way the entire movie was shot so as to appear to be photographed in one continuous take. Lubezki won the award again in 2015 for Iñárritu's The Revenant, becoming a milestone for his third consecutive win and for being the first cinematographer to do so. The film was shot entirely in the wilderness during a cold season, minimizing the amount of CGI and using only natural lighting. The process proved to be extremely difficult, which required a limited amount of time to shoot each scene, thus causing production delays, budget overruns, and changes of locations for proper settings. Despite everything, the movie became both a commercial and a critical success, with much praise towards its atmospheric tone and realism.

== Style and reception ==
Lubezki is known for groundbreaking uses of natural lighting and continuous uninterrupted shots in cinematography, often utilizing a Steadicam, a 3-axis gimbal, or hand-held camera to orchestrate fluid, uninterrupted camera movements during particularly significant scenes. He is also known for his frequent collaborations with directors Terrence Malick, Alfonso Cuarón, and Alejandro González Iñárritu.

Lubezki is a member of both the Mexican Society of Cinematographers and the American Society of Cinematographers. Lubezki won the Royal Photographic Society Lumière Award for major achievement in cinematography, video or animation in 2016.

== Filmography ==
=== Feature film ===
Year	Title	Director	Notes
1990	Bandidos	Luis Estrada	
1991	Sólo con tu pareja	Alfonso Cuarón	
1991	Like Water for Chocolate	Alfonso Arau	With Steven Bernstein
1993	Twenty Bucks	Keva Rosenfeld	
1993	Miroslava	Alejandro Pelayo	
1993	The Harvest	David Marconi	
1994	Reality Bites	Ben Stiller	
1994	Ámbar	Luis Estrada	
1995	A Little Princess	Alfonso Cuarón	
1995	A Walk in the Clouds	Alfonso Arau	
1996	The Birdcage	Mike Nichols	
1998	Great Expectations	Alfonso Cuarón	
1998	Meet Joe Black	Martin Brest	
1999	Sleepy Hollow	Tim Burton	
2000	Things You Can Tell Just by Looking at Her	Rodrigo García	
2001	Ali	Michael Mann	
2001	Y tu mamá también	Alfonso Cuarón	
2003	The Cat in the Hat	Bo Welch	
2004	The Assassination of Richard Nixon	Niels Mueller	Also credited as associate producer
2004	Lemony Snicket's A Series of Unfortunate Events	Brad Silberling	
2005	The New World	Terrence Malick	
2006	Children of Men	Alfonso Cuarón	
2008	Burn After Reading	Coen brothers	
2011	The Tree of Life	Terrence Malick	
2012	To the Wonder	Terrence Malick	
2013	Gravity	Alfonso Cuarón	
2014	Birdman	Alejandro G. Iñárritu	
2015	Last Days in the Desert	Rodrigo García	
2015	Knight of Cups	Terrence Malick	
2015	The Revenant	Alejandro G. Iñárritu	
2017	Song to Song	Terrence Malick	
2022	Amsterdam	David O. Russell	
2026	Digger	Alejandro G. Iñárritu	

=== Television ===
Year	Title	Director	Notes
1989–90	La hora marcada	Alfonso Cuarón; Luis Estrada; Juan Mora Catlett	8 episodes; Also credited as producer
1990	El motel de la muerte	Luis Estrada; Jorge Prior	TV movie; With Alfonso Cuarón, Guillermo Granillo and Antonio Ruiz
1993	Fallen Angels	Steven Soderbergh; Alfonso Cuarón	Episodes "The Quiet Room" and "Murder Obliquely"
2024	Disclaimer	Alfonso Cuarón	Miniseries; With Bruno Delbonnel, also credited as executive producer

TV shorts

Year	Title	Director	Notes
2010	Write the Future	Alejandro González Iñárritu	
2010	Dick Tracy Special	Warren Beatty; Chris Merrill	With Stephanie Martin

=== Music video ===
Year	Title	Director	Ref.
2026	"Patient Zero"	Taylor Swift	

== Awards and nominations ==
Lubezki has been recognized by the Academy of Motion Picture Arts and Sciences for the following films:

- 68th Academy Awards: Best Cinematography, nomination, A Little Princess (1995)
- 72nd Academy Awards: Best Cinematography, nomination, Sleepy Hollow (1999)
- 78th Academy Awards: Best Cinematography, nomination, The New World (2005)
- 79th Academy Awards: Best Cinematography, nomination, Children of Men (2006)
- 84th Academy Awards: Best Cinematography, nomination, The Tree of Life (2011)
- 86th Academy Awards: Best Cinematography, win, Gravity (2013)
- 87th Academy Awards: Best Cinematography, win, Birdman (2014)
- 88th Academy Awards: Best Cinematography, win, The Revenant (2015)

== See also ==
- Cinema of Mexico
