= List of accolades received by Roma =

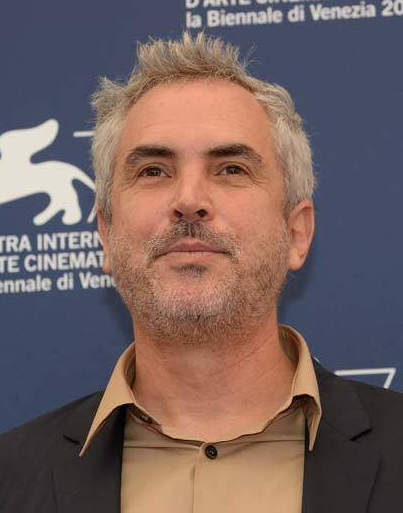
- Cuarón received critical acclaim for his screenplay, direction and cinematography in the film
Accolades
Award	Wins	Nominations
AACTA International Awards	2	3
AARP's Movies for Grownups Awards	0	4
Academy Awards	3	10
ACE Eddie Awards	0	1
African-American Film Critics Association	1	2
Alliance of Women Film Journalists	5	8
American Film Institute Awards	1	1
American Society of Cinematographers	0	1
Ariel Awards	10	15
Art Directors Guild Awards	0	1
Austin Film Critics Association	2	8
Belgian Film Critics Association	0	1
Boston Society of Film Critics	1	1
British Academy Film Awards	4	7
British Independent Film Awards	1	1
Chicago Film Critics Association	5	9
Critics' Choice Movie Awards	4	8
Dallas–Fort Worth Film Critics Association	4	4
David di Donatello Awards	1	1
Detroit Film Critics Society	0	3
Dorian Awards	2	6
Directors Guild of America Awards	1	1
Dublin Film Critics' Circle	2	2
Florida Film Critics Circle	3	5
Georgia Film Critics Association	3	7
Golden Globe Awards	2	3
Gotham Awards	0	1
Goya Awards	1	1
Hollywood Film Awards	1	1
Hollywood Music in Media Awards	0	1
Houston Film Critics Society	3	4
Independent Spirit Awards	1	1
IndieWire Critics Poll	6	6
Location Managers Guild Awards	1	1
London Film Critics' Circle	2	5
Los Angeles Film Critics Association	4	4
National Board of Review	1	1
National Society of Film Critics	4	4
New York Film Critics Circle	3	3
New York Film Critics Online	3	3
Online Film Critics Society	4	7
Palm Springs International Film Festival	1	1
Platino Awards	5	9
Producers Guild of America Awards	0	1
San Diego Film Critics Society	0	2
San Francisco Film Critics Circle	3	8
Santa Barbara International Film Festival	1	1
Satellite Awards	4	8
Seattle Film Critics Society	4	8
St. Louis Film Critics Association	4	7
Telluride Film Festival	1	1
Toronto Film Critics Association	4	4
Toronto International Film Festival	1	1
Utah Film Critics Association	4	4
Venice Film Festival	2	2
Vancouver Film Critics Circle	2	2
Washington D.C. Area Film Critics Association	4	7
Women Film Critics Circle	3	4
Writers Guild of America Awards	0	1

Totals (Note: Certain award groups do not simply award one winner. They acknowledge several different recipients, have runners-up, and have third place. Since this is a specific recognition and is different from losing an award, runner-up mentions are considered wins in this award tally. For simplification and to avoid errors, each award in this list has been presumed to have had a prior nomination.)
- Wins: 134
- Nominations: 227

Roma is a 2018 drama film written and directed by Alfonso Cuarón. Cuarón also produced, co-edited and photographed the film. It stars Yalitza Aparicio, Marina de Tavira, Marco Graf, Daniela Demesa, Enoc Leaño and Daniel Valtierra. Set in the early 1970s, the film is a semi-biographical take on Cuarón's upbringing in Mexico City, and follows the life of a live-in housekeeper to an upper-middle-class family. The title refers to the Colonia Roma district of the city.

== Accolades ==
Award	Date of ceremony	Category	Recipient(s)	Result	Ref.
AACTA International Awards	4 January 2019	Best Film	Roma	Won	
AACTA International Awards	4 January 2019	Best Direction	Alfonso Cuarón	Won	
AACTA International Awards	4 January 2019	Best Screenplay	Alfonso Cuarón	Nominated	
AARP's Movies for Grownups Awards	4 February 2019	Best Picture	Roma	Nominated	
AARP's Movies for Grownups Awards	4 February 2019	Best Director	Alfonso Cuarón	Nominated	
AARP's Movies for Grownups Awards	4 February 2019	Best Time Capsule	Roma	Nominated	
AARP's Movies for Grownups Awards	4 February 2019	Best Foreign Film	Roma	Won	
Academy Awards	24 February 2019	Best Picture	Gabriela Rodríguez and Alfonso Cuarón	Nominated	
Academy Awards	24 February 2019	Best Director	Alfonso Cuarón	Won	
Academy Awards	24 February 2019	Best Actress	Yalitza Aparicio	Nominated	
Academy Awards	24 February 2019	Best Supporting Actress	Marina de Tavira	Nominated	
Academy Awards	24 February 2019	Best Original Screenplay	Alfonso Cuarón	Nominated	
Academy Awards	24 February 2019	Best Foreign Language Film	Mexico	Won	
Academy Awards	24 February 2019	Best Cinematography	Alfonso Cuarón	Won	
Academy Awards	24 February 2019	Best Production Design	Eugenio Caballero and Bárbara Enríquez	Nominated	
Academy Awards	24 February 2019	Best Sound Editing	Sergio Díaz and Skip Lievsay	Nominated	
Academy Awards	24 February 2019	Best Sound Mixing	Skip Lievsay, Craig Henighan and José Antonio García	Nominated	
ACE Eddie Awards	1 February 2019	Best Edited Feature Film – Dramatic	Alfonso Cuarón and Adam Gough	Nominated	
African-American Film Critics Association	11 December 2018	Top Ten Films	Roma	6th place	
African-American Film Critics Association	11 December 2018	Best Foreign Film	Roma	Won	
Alliance of Women Film Journalists	10 January 2019	Best Film	Roma	Won	
Alliance of Women Film Journalists	10 January 2019	Best Director	Alfonso Cuarón	Won	
Alliance of Women Film Journalists	10 January 2019	Best Actress	Yalitza Aparicio	Nominated	
Alliance of Women Film Journalists	10 January 2019	Best Original Screenplay	Alfonso Cuarón	Nominated	
Alliance of Women Film Journalists	10 January 2019	Best Non-English-Language Film	Roma	Won	
Alliance of Women Film Journalists	10 January 2019	Best Cinematography	Alfonso Cuarón	Won	
Alliance of Women Film Journalists	10 January 2019	Best Editing	Adam Gough and Alfonso Cuarón	Won	
Alliance of Women Film Journalists	10 January 2019	Best Breakthrough Performance	Yalitza Aparicio	Nominated	
American Film Institute	4 January 2019	AFI Special Award	Roma	Won	
American Society of Cinematographers	9 February 2019	Outstanding Achievement in Cinematography in Theatrical Releases	Alfonso Cuarón	Nominated	
Ariel Awards	24 June 2019	Best Picture	Roma	Won	
Ariel Awards	24 June 2019	Best Director	Alfonso Cuarón	Won	
Ariel Awards	24 June 2019	Best Actress	Yalitza Aparicio	Nominated	
Ariel Awards	24 June 2019	Best Supporting Actress	Marina de Tavira	Won	
Ariel Awards	24 June 2019	Best Supporting Actor	Jorge Antonio Guerrero	Nominated	
Ariel Awards	24 June 2019	Best Breakthrough Performance	Nancy García	Nominated	
Ariel Awards	24 June 2019	Best Original Screenplay	Alfonso Cuarón	Won	
Ariel Awards	24 June 2019	Best Cinematography	Alfonso Cuarón	Won	
Ariel Awards	24 June 2019	Best Film Editing	Adam Gough and Alfonso Cuarón	Won	
Ariel Awards	24 June 2019	Best Art Direction	Eugenio Caballero, Bárbara Enríquez, Oscar Tello and Gabriel Cortés	Won	
Ariel Awards	24 June 2019	Best Costume Design	Anna Terrazas	Nominated	
Ariel Awards	24 June 2019	Best Makeup	Anton Garfias	Nominated	
Ariel Awards	24 June 2019	Best Special Effects	Sheldon Stopsack and David Griffiths	Won	
Ariel Awards	24 June 2019	Best Visual Effects	Alejandro Vázquez	Won	
Ariel Awards	24 June 2019	Best Sound	Jorge Antonio García, Sergio Díaz, Skip Lievsay and Craig Henighan	Won	
Art Directors Guild Awards	2 February 2019	Excellence in Production Design for a Period Film	Eugenio Caballero	Nominated	
Austin Film Critics Association	7 January 2019	Best Film	Roma	Nominated	
Austin Film Critics Association	7 January 2019	Best Director	Alfonso Cuarón	Nominated	
Austin Film Critics Association	7 January 2019	Best Original Screenplay	Alfonso Cuarón	Nominated	
Austin Film Critics Association	7 January 2019	Best Foreign Language Film	Roma	Nominated	
Austin Film Critics Association	7 January 2019	Best Cinematography	Alfonso Cuarón	Won	
Austin Film Critics Association	7 January 2019	Best Editing	Adam Gough and Alfonso Cuarón	Nominated	
Austin Film Critics Association	7 January 2019	Breakthrough Artist	Yalitza Aparicio	Nominated	
Austin Film Critics Association	7 January 2019	Top Ten Films	Roma	2nd place	
Belgian Film Critics Association	5 January 2019	Grand Prix	Roma	Nominated	
Boston Society of Film Critics	16 December 2018	Best Cinematography	Alfonso Cuarón	Won	
BAFTA Awards	10 February 2019	Best Film	Roma	Won	
BAFTA Awards	10 February 2019	Best Direction	Alfonso Cuarón	Won	
BAFTA Awards	10 February 2019	Best Original Screenplay	Alfonso Cuarón	Nominated	
BAFTA Awards	10 February 2019	Best Film Not in the English Language	Roma	Won	
BAFTA Awards	10 February 2019	Best Cinematography	Alfonso Cuarón	Won	
BAFTA Awards	10 February 2019	Best Production Design	Eugenio Caballero and Bárbara Enríquez	Nominated	
BAFTA Awards	10 February 2019	Best Editing	Adam Gough and Alfonso Cuarón	Nominated	
British Independent Film Awards	2 December 2018	Best Foreign Independent Film	Alfonso Cuarón, Gabriela Rodriguez and Nicolás Celis	Won	
Chicago Film Critics Association	8 December 2018	Best Picture	Roma	Won	
Chicago Film Critics Association	8 December 2018	Best Director	Alfonso Cuarón	Won	
Chicago Film Critics Association	8 December 2018	Best Actress	Yalitza Aparicio	Nominated	
Chicago Film Critics Association	8 December 2018	Best Original Screenplay	Alfonso Cuarón	Nominated	
Chicago Film Critics Association	8 December 2018	Best Foreign Language Film	Roma	Won	
Chicago Film Critics Association	8 December 2018	Best Art Direction	Roma	Nominated	
Chicago Film Critics Association	8 December 2018	Best Cinematography	Alfonso Cuarón	Won	
Chicago Film Critics Association	8 December 2018	Best Editing	Roma	Won	
Chicago Film Critics Association	8 December 2018	Most Promising Performer	Yalitza Aparicio	Nominated	
Critics' Choice Movie Awards	13 January 2019	Best Picture	Roma	Won	
Critics' Choice Movie Awards	13 January 2019	Best Actress	Yalitza Aparicio	Nominated	
Critics' Choice Movie Awards	13 January 2019	Best Director	Alfonso Cuarón	Won	
Critics' Choice Movie Awards	13 January 2019	Best Original Screenplay	Alfonso Cuarón	Nominated	
Critics' Choice Movie Awards	13 January 2019	Best Foreign Language Film	Roma	Won	
Critics' Choice Movie Awards	13 January 2019	Best Art Direction	Eugenio Caballero and Bárbara Enríquez	Nominated	
Critics' Choice Movie Awards	13 January 2019	Best Cinematography	Alfonso Cuarón	Won	
Critics' Choice Movie Awards	13 January 2019	Best Editing	Adam Gough and Alfonso Cuarón	Nominated	
Dallas–Fort Worth Film Critics Association	17 December 2018	Best Film	Roma	2nd Place	
Dallas–Fort Worth Film Critics Association	17 December 2018	Best Director	Alfonso Cuarón	Won	
Dallas–Fort Worth Film Critics Association	17 December 2018	Best Foreign Language Film	Roma	Won	
Dallas–Fort Worth Film Critics Association	17 December 2018	Best Cinematography	Alfonso Cuarón	Won	
David di Donatello Awards	27 March 2019	Best Foreign Film	Roma	Won	
Detroit Film Critics Society	3 December 2018	Best Film	Roma	Nominated	
Detroit Film Critics Society	3 December 2018	Best Director	Alfonso Cuarón	Nominated	
Detroit Film Critics Society	3 December 2018	Best Ensemble	Roma	Nominated	
Dorian Awards	12 January 2019	Film of the Year	Roma	Nominated	
Dorian Awards	12 January 2019	Director of the Year (Film or Television)	Alfonso Cuarón	Won	
Dorian Awards	12 January 2019	Film Performance of the Year – Actress	Yalitza Aparicio	Nominated	
Dorian Awards	12 January 2019	Screenplay of the Year (Original or Adapted)	Alfonso Cuarón	Nominated	
Dorian Awards	12 January 2019	Foreign Language Film of the Year	Roma	Won	
Dorian Awards	12 January 2019	Visually Striking Film of the Year	Roma	Nominated	
Directors Guild of America Awards	2 February 2019	Outstanding Directorial Achievement in Feature Film	Alfonso Cuarón	Won	
Dublin Film Critics' Circle	20 December 2018	Best Director	Alfonso Cuarón	Won	
Dublin Film Critics' Circle	20 December 2018	Best Cinematography	Alfonso Cuarón	2nd place	
Florida Film Critics Circle	21 December 2018	Best Picture	Roma	Nominated	
Florida Film Critics Circle	21 December 2018	Best Director	Alfonso Cuarón	Won	
Florida Film Critics Circle	21 December 2018	Best Foreign Language Film	Roma	Runner-up	
Florida Film Critics Circle	21 December 2018	Best Cinematography	Alfonso Cuarón	Runner-up	
Florida Film Critics Circle	21 December 2018	Best Art Direction / Production Design	Roma	Nominated	
Forqué Awards	12 January 2019	Best Latin-American Film	Roma	Won	
Georgia Film Critics Association	12 January 2019	Best Picture	Roma	Nominated	
Georgia Film Critics Association	12 January 2019	Best Director	Alfonso Cuarón	Won	
Georgia Film Critics Association	12 January 2019	Best Actress	Yalitza Aparicio	Nominated	
Georgia Film Critics Association	12 January 2019	Best Original Screenplay	Alfonso Cuarón	Nominated	
Georgia Film Critics Association	12 January 2019	Best Foreign Film	Roma	Won	
Georgia Film Critics Association	12 January 2019	Best Cinematography	Alfonso Cuarón	Won	
Georgia Film Critics Association	12 January 2019	Breakthrough Award	Yalitza Aparicio	Nominated	
Golden Globe Awards	6 January 2019	Best Foreign Language Film	Roma	Won	
Golden Globe Awards	6 January 2019	Best Director	Alfonso Cuarón	Won	
Golden Globe Awards	6 January 2019	Best Screenplay	Alfonso Cuarón	Nominated	
Gotham Awards	26 November 2018	Breakthrough Actor	Yalitza Aparicio	Nominated	
Goya Awards	2 February 2019	Best Iberoamerican Film	Roma	Won	
Hollywood Film Awards	4 November 2018	New Hollywood Award	Yalitza Aparicio	Won	
Hollywood Music in Media Awards	14 November 2018	Outstanding Music Supervision – Film	Lynn Fainchtein	Nominated	
Houston Film Critics Society	3 January 2019	Best Picture	Roma	Nominated	
Houston Film Critics Society	3 January 2019	Best Director	Alfonso Cuarón	Won	
Houston Film Critics Society	3 January 2019	Best Foreign Language Film	Roma	Won	
Houston Film Critics Society	3 January 2019	Best Cinematography	Alfonso Cuarón	Won	
Independent Spirit Awards	23 February 2019	Best International Film	Alfonso Cuarón	Won	
IndieWire Critics Poll	17 December 2018	Best Film	Roma	Won	
IndieWire Critics Poll	17 December 2018	Best Director	Alfonso Cuarón	Won	
IndieWire Critics Poll	17 December 2018	Best Actress	Yalitza Aparicio	2nd place	
IndieWire Critics Poll	17 December 2018	Best Screenplay	Alfonso Cuarón	3rd place	
IndieWire Critics Poll	17 December 2018	Best Foreign Language Films	Roma	Won	
IndieWire Critics Poll	17 December 2018	Best Cinematography	Alfonso Cuarón	Won	
Location Managers Guild Awards	21 September 2019	Outstanding Locations in Period Film	Claudia Puebla Monge and Horacio Rodriguez de Zamacona	Won	
London Film Critics' Circle	20 January 2019	Film of the Year	Roma	Won	
London Film Critics' Circle	20 January 2019	Foreign Language Film of the Year	Roma	Nominated	
London Film Critics' Circle	20 January 2019	Director of the Year	Alfonso Cuarón	Won	
London Film Critics' Circle	20 January 2019	Actress of the Year	Yalitza Aparicio	Nominated	
London Film Critics' Circle	20 January 2019	Screenwriter of the Year	Alfonso Cuarón	Nominated	
Los Angeles Film Critics Association	9 December 2018	Best Film	Roma	Won	
Los Angeles Film Critics Association	9 December 2018	Best Director	Alfonso Cuarón	Runner-up	
Los Angeles Film Critics Association	9 December 2018	Best Cinematography	Alfonso Cuarón	Won	
Los Angeles Film Critics Association	9 December 2018	Best Editing	Adam Gough and Alfonso Cuarón	Runner-up	
Macondo Awards	9 November 2019	Best Ibero-American film	Roma	Won	
National Board of Review	27 November 2018	Top 10 Films	Roma	Won	
National Society of Film Critics	5 January 2019	Best Picture	Roma	2nd place	
National Society of Film Critics	5 January 2019	Best Director	Alfonso Cuarón	Won	
National Society of Film Critics	5 January 2019	Best Foreign Language Film	Roma	Won	
National Society of Film Critics	5 January 2019	Best Cinematography	Alfonso Cuarón	Won	
New York Film Critics Circle	29 November 2018	Best Film	Roma	Won	
New York Film Critics Circle	29 November 2018	Best Director	Alfonso Cuarón	Won	
New York Film Critics Circle	29 November 2018	Best Cinematography	Alfonso Cuarón	Won	
New York Film Critics Online	9 December 2018	Best Picture	Roma	Won	
New York Film Critics Online	9 December 2018	Best Director	Alfonso Cuarón	Won	
New York Film Critics Online	9 December 2018	Top 10 Films	Roma	Won	
Online Film Critics Society	2 January 2019	Best Picture	Roma	Won	
Online Film Critics Society	2 January 2019	Best Director	Alfonso Cuarón	Won	
Online Film Critics Society	2 January 2019	Best Actress	Yalitza Aparicio	Nominated	
Online Film Critics Society	2 January 2019	Best Film Not in the English Language	Roma	Won	
Online Film Critics Society	2 January 2019	Best Original Screenplay	Alfonso Cuarón	Nominated	
Online Film Critics Society	2 January 2019	Best Editing	Adam Gough and Alfonso Cuarón	Nominated	
Online Film Critics Society	2 January 2019	Best Cinematography	Alfonso Cuarón	Won	
Palm Springs International Film Festival	3 January 2019	Sonny Bono Visionary Award	Alfonso Cuarón	Won	
Platino Awards	12 May 2019	Best Ibero-American Film	Roma	Won	
Platino Awards	12 May 2019	Best Director	Alfonso Cuarón	Won	
Platino Awards	12 May 2019	Best Actress	Yalitza Aparicio	Nominated	
Platino Awards	12 May 2019	Best Actress	Marina de Tavira	Nominated	
Platino Awards	12 May 2019	Best Screenplay	Alfonso Cuarón	Won	
Platino Awards	12 May 2019	Best Editing	Adam Gough and Alfonso Cuarón	Nominated	
Platino Awards	12 May 2019	Best Art Direction	Eugenio Caballero	Nominated	
Platino Awards	12 May 2019	Best Cinematography	Alfonso Cuarón	Won	
Platino Awards	12 May 2019	Best Sound	Sergio Díaz, Skip Lievsay, Craig Henighan and José Antonio García	Won	
Producers Guild of America Awards	19 January 2019	Outstanding Producer of Theatrical Motion Pictures	Gabriela Rodríguez and Alfonso Cuarón	Nominated	
San Diego Film Critics Society	10 December 2018	Best Foreign Language Film	Roma	Nominated	
San Diego Film Critics Society	10 December 2018	Best Cinematography	Alfonso Cuarón	Nominated	
San Francisco Film Critics Circle	9 December 2018	Best Film	Roma	Won	
San Francisco Film Critics Circle	9 December 2018	Best Director	Alfonso Cuarón	Nominated	
San Francisco Film Critics Circle	9 December 2018	Best Actress	Yalitza Aparicio	Nominated	
San Francisco Film Critics Circle	9 December 2018	Best Original Screenplay	Alfonso Cuarón	Nominated	
San Francisco Film Critics Circle	9 December 2018	Best Foreign Language Film	Roma	Won	
San Francisco Film Critics Circle	9 December 2018	Best Production Design	Eugenio Caballero	Nominated	
San Francisco Film Critics Circle	9 December 2018	Best Cinematography	Alfonso Cuarón	Won	
San Francisco Film Critics Circle	9 December 2018	Best Editing	Adam Gough and Alfonso Cuarón	Nominated	
Santa Barbara International Film Festival	5 February 2019	Virtuoso Award	Yalitza Aparicio	Won	
Satellite Awards	22 February 2019	Best Foreign Language Film	Roma	Won	
Satellite Awards	22 February 2019	Best Director	Alfonso Cuarón	Won	
Satellite Awards	22 February 2019	Best Actress – Motion Picture, Drama	Yalitza Aparicio	Nominated	
Satellite Awards	22 February 2019	Best Original Screenplay	Alfonso Cuarón	Won	
Satellite Awards	22 February 2019	Best Editing	Alfonso Cuarón	Won	
Satellite Awards	22 February 2019	Best Cinematography	Alfonso Cuarón	Nominated	
Satellite Awards	22 February 2019	Best Art Direction and Production Design	Eugenio Caballero	Nominated	
Satellite Awards	22 February 2019	Best Sound (Editing and Mixing)	Roma	Nominated	
Seattle Film Critics Society	17 December 2018	Best Picture of the Year	Roma	Won	
Seattle Film Critics Society	17 December 2018	Best Director	Alfonso Cuarón	Won	
Seattle Film Critics Society	17 December 2018	Best Actress in a Leading Role	Yalitza Aparicio	Nominated	
Seattle Film Critics Society	17 December 2018	Best Screenplay	Alfonso Cuarón	Nominated	
Seattle Film Critics Society	17 December 2018	Best Foreign Language Film	Roma	Won	
Seattle Film Critics Society	17 December 2018	Best Production Design	Eugenio Caballero and Bárbara Enríquez	Nominated	
Seattle Film Critics Society	17 December 2018	Best Cinematography	Alfonso Cuarón	Won	
Seattle Film Critics Society	17 December 2018	Best Film Editing	Adam Gough and Alfonso Cuarón	Nominated	
St. Louis Film Critics Association	16 December 2018	Best Film	Roma	Nominated	
St. Louis Film Critics Association	16 December 2018	Best Director	Alfonso Cuarón	Runner-up	
St. Louis Film Critics Association	16 December 2018	Best Foreign Film	Roma	Won	
St. Louis Film Critics Association	16 December 2018	Best Production Design	Eugenio Caballero	Nominated	
St. Louis Film Critics Association	16 December 2018	Best Editing	Adam Gough and Alfonso Cuarón	Nominated	
St. Louis Film Critics Association	16 December 2018	Best Cinematography	Alfonso Cuarón	Won	
St. Louis Film Critics Association	16 December 2018	Best Scene	Beach rescue	Won	
Telluride Film Festival	3 September 2018	Silver Medallion	Alfonso Cuarón	Won	
Toronto Film Critics Association	9 December 2018	Best Film	Roma	Won	
Toronto Film Critics Association	9 December 2018	Best Director	Alfonso Cuarón	Won	
Toronto Film Critics Association	9 December 2018	Best Screenplay	Alfonso Cuarón	Runner-up	
Toronto Film Critics Association	9 December 2018	Best Foreign Language Film	Roma	Runner-up	
Toronto International Film Festival	16 September 2018	Grolsch People's Choice Awards	Roma	3rd place	
Utah Film Critics Association	16 December 2018	Best Picture	Roma	Runner-up	
Utah Film Critics Association	16 December 2018	Best Director	Alfonso Cuarón	Won	
Utah Film Critics Association	16 December 2018	Best Non-English Language Film	Roma	Won	
Utah Film Critics Association	16 December 2018	Best Cinematography	Alfonso Cuarón	Won	
Venice Film Festival	8 September 2018	Golden Lion	Roma	Won	
Venice Film Festival	8 September 2018	SIGNIS Award	Roma	Won	
Vancouver Film Critics Circle	17 December 2018	Best Film	Roma	Won	
Vancouver Film Critics Circle	17 December 2018	Best Foreign Language Film	Roma	Won	
Washington D.C. Area Film Critics Association	3 December 2018	Best Film	Roma	Won	
Washington D.C. Area Film Critics Association	3 December 2018	Best Director	Alfonso Cuarón	Won	
Washington D.C. Area Film Critics Association	3 December 2018	Best Cinematography	Alfonso Cuarón	Won	
Washington D.C. Area Film Critics Association	3 December 2018	Best Foreign Language Film	Roma	Won	
Washington D.C. Area Film Critics Association	3 December 2018	Best Original Screenplay	Alfonso Cuarón	Nominated	
Washington D.C. Area Film Critics Association	3 December 2018	Best Art Direction	Eugenio Caballero and Bárbara Enríquez	Nominated	
Washington D.C. Area Film Critics Association	3 December 2018	Best Editing	Alfonso Cuarón and Adam Gough	Nominated	
Women Film Critics Circle	21 December 2018	Best Movie About Women	Roma	Runner-up	
Women Film Critics Circle	21 December 2018	Best Foreign Film by or About Women	Roma	Won	
Women Film Critics Circle	21 December 2018	Karen Morley Award	Roma	Won	
Women Film Critics Circle	21 December 2018	The Invisible Woman Award	Yalitza Aparicio	Nominated	
Writers Guild of America Awards	17 February 2019	Best Original Screenplay	Alfonso Cuarón	Nominated	

== See also ==
- 2018 in film
