= Disney Television Animation =

American animation studio

- Logo used since 2014

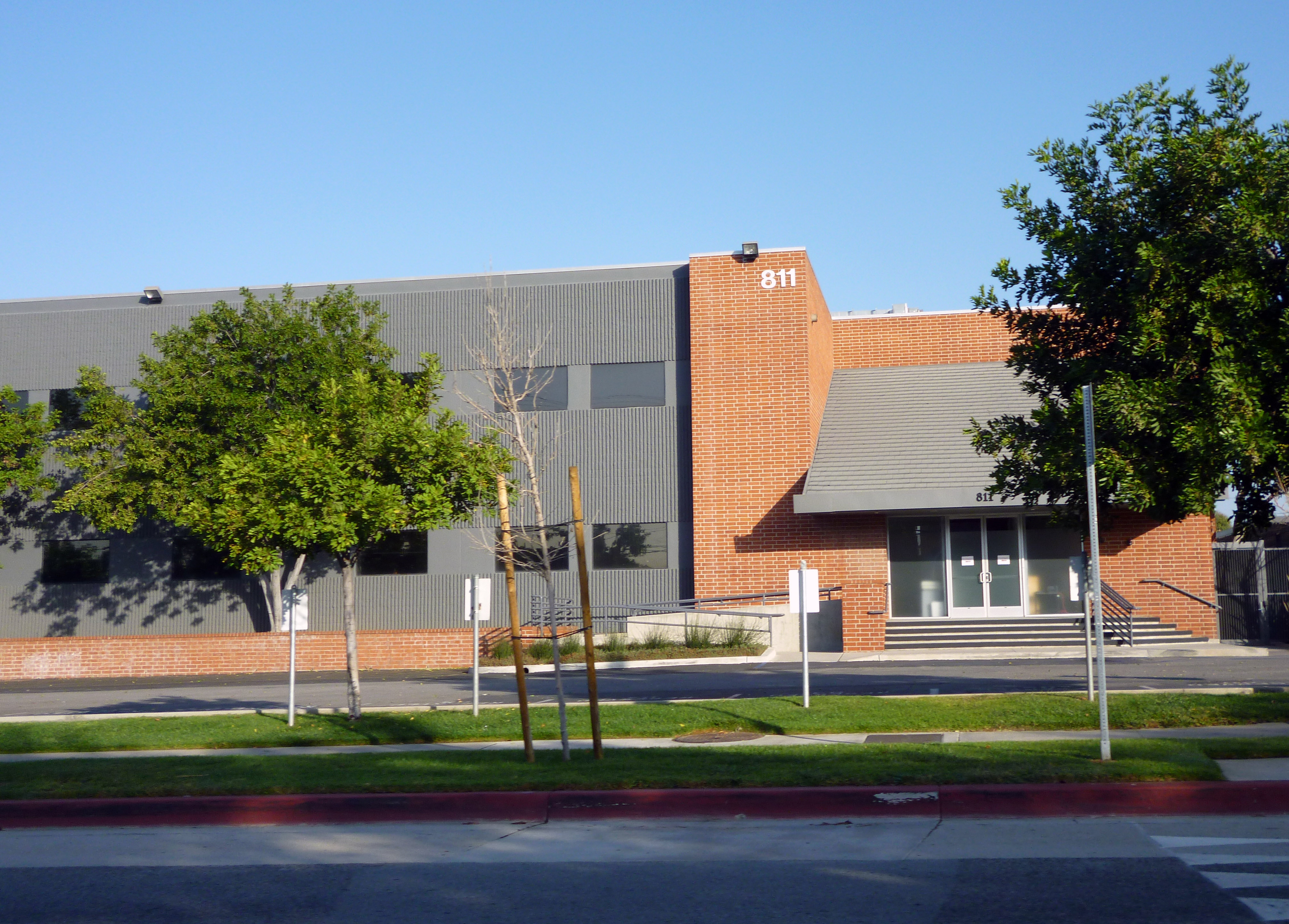
- Disney Television Animation's headquarters in Glendale, California.
- Trade name: Disney Channel Animation
- Formerly: Walt Disney Pictures Television Animation Group (1984–1987); Walt Disney Television Animation (1987–2011)
- Type: Subsidiary
- Industry: Animation; Television production
- Founded: December 5, 1984; 41 years ago
- Founder: Gary Krisel
- Headquarters: Frank G. Wells Building, 3rd Floor, 500 South Buena Vista Street Burbank, California 91521 (1984–2011); 811 Sonora Avenue Glendale, California 91201 (2011–present)
- Number of locations: 3
- Key people: Meredith Roberts (SVP, GM)
- Products: Animated television series; Direct-to-video films; Specials
- Parent: Walt Disney Television (1984–2003); Disney Kids & Family (2003–present)

Disney Television Animation (DTVA; also shortened to Disney TVA), formerly known as Walt Disney Pictures Television Animation Group and Walt Disney Television Animation, is an American animation studio that serves as the television animation production arm of Disney Kids & Family, a division of Disney Entertainment Television, which is a division of Disney Entertainment, which is one of the three main divisions of The Walt Disney Company. The studio was originally established in 1984, by Gary Krisel during the reorganization and subsequent re-incorporation of Disney following the arrival of then CEO Michael Eisner that year.

The division is responsible for developing and producing animated television series, films, specials and short films for broadcast on the Disney branded networks; Disney Channel, Disney XD and Disney Jr., as well as Disney+.

== History ==
=== Background ===
The Walt Disney Company first ventured into the television industry as early as 1950, beginning with the one-hour Christmas special, One Hour in Wonderland. This was followed by the 1951 Christmas special, The Walt Disney Christmas Show, the long-running (1954–2008) anthology series, The Wonderful World of Disney (which was Disney's first regular series as a whole), the children's variety show The Mickey Mouse Club, and the adventure series, Zorro (1957–1959).

However, one element was missing from Disney's expansion into television: an original animated television series. Until the early 1980s, the studio had never produced its own original animated shows in-house because Walt Disney felt it was economically impossible. Nearly all pre-1985 TV animation was wrap-around segments made to bridge the gaps on existing theatrical material on The Wonderful World of Disney. Osamu Tezuka met Walt at the 1964 World's Fair, at which time Disney said he hoped to "make something just like" Tezuka's Astro Boy someday, but nothing came of it.

=== 1984–1990: Early beginnings ===
The hiring of a new CEO for The Walt Disney Company in 1984, Michael Eisner, led him to push to expand Disney into new areas thus the establishment of a television animation division that year, whose output would be shopped to all markets: networks, Disney Channel and syndication. Eisner held a meeting at his home in which he brought up the concept of doing a series on the Gummi bear as his kids like the candy. Originally, the staff was told that they could not use the principal Disney cartoon characters in the new shows.

The Walt Disney Television Animation department was formed in November 1984 with Gary Krisel as president and Michael Webster as senior vice president. This was considered a risky move because animated TV series were generally considered low-budget investments for most of the history of TV cartoons up through the 1980s. Many critics say that Disney's own animation studio had lost most of its luster during the period from Walt Disney's passing in the 1960s through the 1980s. However, the studio took several risks that paid off handsomely. The studio successfully gambled on the idea that a substantially larger investment into quality animation could be made back through both network television and over-the-air in syndication, as well as cable. The final result is a string of higher budgeted animated television productions which proved to be profitable ventures and raised the standard for the TV medium.

The first productions to make it to air from the studio arrived in 1985, with Eisner's concept fleshed out into Adventures of the Gummi Bears, joined by an original concept The Wuzzles, both which are based upon talking animal-based conceptions. The third series in a similar vein, Fluppy Dogs, was produced as a single 45min-long TV movie pilot that aired on ABC on Thanksgiving 1986 and was loosely based a series of children's books and line of toys about a race of anthropomorphic pastel-colored dimension-hopping alien called "fluppy dogs." Dismal viewership ensured the project never made it to series.

In 1987, Disney premiered DuckTales, the first installment in its successful line of syndicated animated television series. Though still forbidden from using the star characters, minor characters such as Scrooge McDuck and Huey, Dewey and Louie were allowed, and Disney did concede to allow for a brief appearance by Donald Duck to establish the series, allowing them to adapt the Duck universe adventure serials by Carl Barks into animation. The show was successful enough to spawn a feature film, DuckTales the Movie: Treasure of the Lost Lamp, and two spin-off series: Darkwing Duck and Quack Pack. 1990 release Treasure of the Lost Lamp was the first movie from TV Animation Disney MovieToon unit. Disney Television Animation hired a director of specials, Sharon Morrill, in 1993.

=== 1990–2003: Broadcast networks and syndication era ===
==== The Disney Afternoon ====
The success of DuckTales also paved the way for a new wave of high-quality animated TV series, including Disney's own The New Adventures of Winnie the Pooh in 1988. Later, early that spring, Chip 'n Dale Rescue Rangers debuted on March 4, 1989, and was paired with DuckTales in an hour-long syndicated show through the 1989-1990 television season. In the 1990–1991 season, Disney expanded the idea even further, to create The Disney Afternoon, a two-hour-long syndicated block of half-hour cartoons, which premiered much later on September 10, 1990. DuckTales was one of the early flagship cartoons in the block.

On August 24, 1994, with Jeffrey Katzenberg's resignation, Richard Frank became head of newly formed Walt Disney Television and Telecommunications (WDTT), which included WDTA, from units of The Walt Disney Studios. Morrill was in charge of the first Aladdin direct-to-video sequel launching Disney Video Premiere/Direct to Video unit.

Three overseas Disney studios were set up to produce the company's animated television series. Disney Animation Australia was started in 1988. In 1989, the Brizzi brothers sold Brizzi Films to Disney Television Animation and was renamed Walt Disney Animation France. Also that year, Disney Animation Japan was started. Walt Disney Animation Canada was opened in January 1996 to tap Canada's animator pool and produce direct-to-video. As direct-to-video increased in importance, the overseas studios moved to making feature films.

WDTT chair Frank left Disney in March 1995. With Krisel expecting to be promoted to head up WDTT but passed over, Krisel left WDTA at the end of his contract in January 1996. At the time the Walt Disney Company merged with Capital Cities/ABC, TV Animation was a unit of Walt Disney Television within the Walt Disney Television and Telecommunications group (WDTT). With the retirement of WDTT group president Dennis Hightower in April 1996 and ongoing post-merger reorganization, the unit (along with its Disney TV parent) was transferred to the Walt Disney Studios.

==== One Saturday Morning, ABC Kids, One Too, and Animation Weekdays ====
When the September 1, 1997 season started, the block dropped The Disney Afternoon (temporally rebranded as the "Disney-Kellogg Alliance"), moving shows to Disney Channel. On September 13, 1997, Disney's ABC unit launched Disney's One Saturday Morning. The programming block included several new shows, such as 101 Dalmatians, Recess, Pepper Ann, Disney's Doug, and Mickey Mouse Works.

In January 1998, Disney also reached a deal to program a new children's block for UPN, Disney's One Too, to replace that network's internal UPN Kids block. The syndicated block ran until the debut of One Too on September 6, 1999; which aired mainly the same shows as One Saturday Morning.

By April 1998, Disney MovieToons was folded in with Walt Disney Video Premieres films and network television specials of Disney Television Animation as Morrill moved to executive vice president over her pre-existing units. At the same time, Barry Blumberg was elevated to the executive vice president for network and syndicated animated television series. Both reported to Disney Television president Charles Hirschhorn.

In the second quarter of 2000, due to weak financial performance, Disney Animation Canada was closed. David Stainton took charge of the company as executive vice president in January 2000 then as president in February 2002 under Thomas Schumacher.

Due to the reconstruction, Disney and ABC also rebranded its One Saturday Morning block to ABC Kids (a subtle tribute to the Fox Kids brand after being acquired by Disney through its purchase of Fox Family Worldwide in 2001) on September 14, 2002, alongside One Too into Animation Weekdays from five days ago. On August 31, 2003, Disney discontinued the Animation Weekdays block, thus ending their deal with UPN.

After the relaunch as ABC Kids, many of the shows' premieres moved to sister network Toon Disney due to schedule constraints. The remaining shows included: The Weekenders, Teacher's Pet, House of Mouse, Lloyd in Space, Teamo Supremo, and Fillmore!. All new episodes finished airing by 2004, allowing the network to switch to syndicating promotions for new original shows for Disney Channel and upcoming Jetix brand (which held the previous Fox Kids library).

=== 2003–2017: As a division of Disney Channel ===
Logo as Walt Disney Television Animation from 2003 to 2012

In January 2003, Disney initiated a reorganization of its theatrical and animation units to improve resource usage and continued focus on new characters and franchise development. Disney then transferred all Television Animation to ABC Cable Networks Group. In this reorganization, the Disney MovieToons/Disney Video Premieres unit moved from Television Animation to Feature Animation. The studio was then renamed Disneytoon Studios. While Stainton took over as President of Disney Feature Animation from Schumacher, Blumberg returned to WDTVA as president. Kim Possible became the first cartoon produced by WDTA to be a Disney Channel Original Series in 2002.

In 2004, Walt Disney Television Animation formed a joint venture with partner Jetix Europe to produce animated series for the Jetix Europe-owned channels globally, titled Jetix Animation Concepts. Three shows were produced by WDTA under the banner: Super Robot Monkey Team Hyperforce Go!, Get Ed, and Yin Yang Yo!.

Throughout the 2000s, Disney continued to create new animated Disney Channel (and Playhouse Disney) Originals such as Lilo & Stitch: The Series, Dave the Barbarian, Brandy & Mr. Whiskers, Mickey Mouse Clubhouse, My Friends Tigger & Pooh, and The Emperor's New School were in already in production. At this point, animated series would have to be produced solely by the network's animation division. So Disney Channel began experimenting with newer animation techniques to reduce costs under the re-established Disney Channels Worldwide.

Logo as just Disney Television Animation, complementing the Disney Channel brand and used in tandem from 2012 to 2016.

The Buzz on Maggie was among the first Disney series to fully utilize Adobe Flash animation, thus saving costs and allowing experimentation. American Dragon: Jake Long (which premiered just months prior) and The Replacements received cleaner redesigns for their second seasons (noteworthy, as both series originated as their creator's storybooks) to ease the animation styles for fitting TV budgets. The success of Kim Possible also helped show that there was marketing value in Disney Channel cartoons as the network ordered a fourth season (opposed to the standard three seasons of 65 episodes). Disney soon launched Phineas and Ferb soon after the closure of Kim Possible (which surpassed it as their longest-running animated series).

In 2009, Disney–ABC Television Group rebranded both Toon Disney and Jetix as Disney XD with the Jetix brand officially being retired by 2010. The goal was to simplify the marketing of channels by merging the two brands. In 2011, the ABC Kids block closed as well. By the early 2010s, the television group started to create some original shows for new sister channel Disney XD. The group renamed the animation studio to just Disney Television Animation (or DTVA). Playhouse Disney was rebranded as Disney Jr. in 2011 and receiving standalone channels in 2012; by replacing Soapnet (domestically) and the Jetix Play channels (internationally).

Kick Buttowski: Suburban Daredevil became the first Disney XD original animated show preceding Disney Channel's Fish Hooks. The following Disney XD cartoons were Motorcity, Tron Uprising, Randy Cunningham: 9th Grade Ninja, and Penn Zero: Part-Time Hero. All of which were co-produced by other animation resources except for The 7D (which was originally greenlit for Disney Jr.).

In 2015, the studio debuted Descendants: Wicked World, their first project based on the live-action Descendants franchise by the Disney Channel Original Movies division.

Despite still making original shows for the main channel by 2014, most animated shows such as Gravity Falls and Wander Over Yonder shifted as Disney XD Originals. Mickey Mouse, Descendants: Wicked World, and Tangled: The Series remained the only shows not moved to the sister channel.

=== 2017–present: Animation resurgence, reboots, spin-offs of iconic properties and expansion ===
In 2015, a reboot of DuckTales was announced for Disney XD being the studio's first ever reboot. In 2016, Disney XD greenlit Big City Greens (then titled Country Club). Disney announced Milo Murphy's Law for Disney XD that same year, alongside Big Hero 6: The Series.

However, to renovate marketing, Disney slowed production of all original shows for Disney XD, moving most Disney XD originals to the main Disney Channel. The last shows to air on Disney XD as Disney XD originals were Star Wars Resistance beginning with its second season, DuckTales, and Big Hero 6: The Series. The latter two moved back to Disney XD from the main channel for their third seasons, both of which premiered in 2020. The final show that was exclusively on Disney XD was Billy Dilley's Super-Duper Subterranean Summer in 2017.

Since 2017, the studio has collaborated with Walt Disney Imagineering and Disney Parks, Experiences and Products in providing character designs and animation for various attractions in Disneyland Resort, Walt Disney World and Disney Cruise Line from the Mickey Mouse universe and The Disney Afternoon. These include Mickey & Minnie's Runaway Railway in 2020, Aqua-Mouse, a water coaster for the Disney Wish in 2021, the Disney Treasure for 2024 and the Disney Destiny for 2025, DuckTales: World Showcase Adventure for EPCOT in 2022 and the Mickey's Toontown refurbishment in 2023. In April 2025, Disney Live Entertainment announced a live-stage show for Disney's California Adventure "Mickey Mouse Clubhouse Live!" based on the Mickey Mouse Clubhouse franchise.

In Summer 2022, the studio started a collaboration with Walt Disney Imagineering and Disney Yellow Shoes in providing redesings and animations of several characters from Walt Disney Animation Studios, Pixar Animation Studios, The Muppets Studio and Imagineering for the Walt Disney World passholder magnets.

Beginning in 2018, several productions and characters from the studio have gotten live-action adaptations by the Disney Channel Original Movies and Walt Disney Pictures sister studios, including a Kim Possible live action film which premiered on Disney Channel in 2019 and Chip 'n Dale: Rescue Rangers as a live-action animation hybrid film on Disney+ in 2022. In December 2024, Kiara and Kion from The Lion King II: Simba's Pride and The Lion Guard got adapted in the photorealistically animated prequel film Mufasa: The Lion King. In August 2026, it was announced that the Lilo & Stitch: The Series character Angel will debut in Lilo & Stitch 2 slated for a May 2028 release.

In February of that year, the studio greenlit two new shows Amphibia and The Owl House, to mark their return to animation. Big City Greens (initially intended to air on Disney XD) switched to Disney Channel. The remaining solely-produced shows by the studio, such as Star vs. the Forces of Evil, DuckTales, Big Hero 6: The Series, and Milo Murphy's Law, moved their premieres as well, with many of their productions being wrapped up.

In early 2019, the studio began making animated interstitial for Disney Jr. and Disney Channel based on the characters from the productions of the studio like Mickey Mornings, a revival of Minnie's Bow Toons and Me & Mickey Vlog for Disney Jr. and Chibi Tiny Tales, Broken Karaoke, Disney Roadtrip and How Not to Draw for Disney Channel. Since 2020, the division has also been used by Disney to cross-promote multiple live-action film franchises produced by Disney Branded Television for Disney Channel Original Movies and Disney+ Original Films as well making shorts based on the live-action films from the Walt Disney Studios library and rides and attractions from Walt Disney World and Disneyland Resort. Additionally, the division has been produced several season-themed compilation specials of the Disney Channel's interstitial shorts hosted by characters from Big City Greens, The Ghost and Molly McGee, Hailey's on It! and Kiff under the name Shorts Spectacular. In 2022, the division launched a crossover series under the name Chibiverse based on Chibi Tiny Tales.

In summer 2019, long-time Disney Television Animation head Eric Coleman left the studio to become development executive at Illumination. Coleman was replaced by former general manager of DisneyToon Studios Meredith Roberts who served as senior VP animation strategy at Disney TVA since the shut down of DisneyToon Studios on 2018. The studio would inherit the former DisneyToon Studios building as a third animation unit for future productions.

In 2019, Disney greenlit two new shows, The Ghost and Molly McGee and Moon Girl and Devil Dinosaur, a co-production with corporate sister studio Marvel Animation. The same year it was revealed that the studio was working on Monsters at Work, a spin-off sequel series of the Monsters Inc. franchise from Pixar, and Phineas and Ferb the Movie: Candace Against the Universe for the Disney+ streaming service.

In February 2020, the studio announced that they were working on The Proud Family: Louder and Prouder, a revival and sequel to the original 2001 series for Disney+. In October 2020, the studio ordered a new series Hamster & Gretel for Disney Channel. In November 2020, it was announced that Point Grey Pictures would produce a Darkwing Duck reboot with Disney TVA for Disney+ which would be greenlit in September 2026. The same month the studio debuted The Wonderful World of Mickey Mouse, a sequel series to the original Mickey Mouse (2013) series.

Late 2021 and early 2022 saw several changes in management at Disney TVA, with former Blue Sky Studios executive Lisa Fragner joining as vice-president of development for Disney+ in November 2021, alongside longtime Disney TVA executive Elizabeth Waybright Taylor, who was also promoted as vice-president of development the same month. Fragner would oversee development on projects for Disney+, while Taylor would supervise Disney Channel projects. In February 2022, Sarah Finn was promoted to senior vice-president of production, overseeing physical production for projects across all three Disney networks. On July 22, 2022, Douglas Bensimon and Edward Mejia were both promoted to VP of current series; Bensimon will oversee development on original series, while Mejia will work on series based on preexisting Disney IP.

In 2021, the studio would order a slate of original series, the first ones where Kiff, a co-production with Titmouse, Inc., Hailey's On It! and Primos for Disney Channel. Alice's Wonderland Bakery, Rise Up, Sing Out and Firebuds for Disney Jr. In August 2021, the studio would announce two new holiday movies Mickey's Tale of Two Witches and Mickey and Minnie Wish Upon a Christmas for Disney Jr. In December of that year the studio greenlit The Witchverse, a joint venture with Baobab Studios for Disney+.

In January 2022, the studio announced that they had begun production on Big City Greens the Movie: Spacecation for Disney Channel and Disney+. In February 2022, it was reported that Disney TVA was developing an animated film based on Superfudge with AGBO for Disney+. The studio is also developing a film titled School for Sensitive Souls as part of former Disney Branded Television president Gary Marsh's overall deal with Disney. In November 2021, it was revealed that as part of Lisa Fragner's promotion as VP of development at Disney TVA an animated feature film adaptation of Confessions of an Imaginary Friend was in the works.

In April 2022, the studio announced that it will collaborate with sister animation studio 20th Television Animation on Rhona Who Lives by the River for Disney+. In May, the studio ordered Cookies & Milk, produced by Cinema Gypsy Productions & Jesse James Films.

In June 2022, Disney Television Animation General Manager Meredith Roberts was promoted to Executive Vice President of Animation at Disney Branded Television. The same month the studio greenlit Zombies: The Re-Animated Series based on the Disney Channel Original Movie franchise.

In November 2022, the studio began developing workplace comedy series Intercats a co-production with Baobab Studios. The same month the studio started development in Sofia the First: Royal Magic, a sequel series of Sofia the First as part of the 10th anniversary of the original series with the project being fully greenlit in August 2024. Later the studio debuted their first stop-motion project a Christmas special named Mickey Saves Christmas which aired on ABC, Disney Channel, Disney XD and Disney Jr. Another stop-motion special Mickey and Friends: Trick or Treats debuted in October 2023. A series of sequel shorts based on the specials Mickey's Christmas Tales, Mickey's Spooky Stories and Mickey and Minnie's Christmas Carols debuted in November 2023, October 2024 and November 2024 respectively.

In January 2023, the studio announced that Phineas and Ferb would be getting a revival with two brand new seasons for Disney Channel and Disney+. In June 2023, the studio would announce StuGo, another co-production with Titmouse, Inc. for Disney Channel. The same month, it was announced that The Wonderful World of Mickey Mouse would be ending after the premiere of the special Steamboat Silly, which debuted in July 2023 on Disney+.

In August 2023, the studio announced Mickey Mouse Clubhouse+, their first reboot based on a preschool property.

In June 2024, it was announced that the studio would revive the Prep & Landing series who originated at Walt Disney Animation Studios in a new holiday special under the name Prep & Landing: The Snowball Protocol. The same month during the Annecy International Animation Film Festival as part of a panel in honor of the studio's 40th anniversary Meredith Roberts mentioned that the studio was looking in future strategies who will try to meet kids where they're consuming content, which includes gaming and web-based content as well the division is boldly entering new territory, with projects in development in genres that Disney Television Animation has yet to explore for kids and family co-viewing audience.

In September 2024, it was announced that Kiff would be getting two standalone specials with a Halloween special named The Haunting of Miss McGravy's House for October 2024 and Lore of the Ring Light which debuted in January 2025.

In November 2024, the studio announced a new original Christmas special Mickey and the Very Many Christmases for Disney Jr. The same month the studio debuted An Almost Christmas Story, an original stop-motion short film in collaboration with Titmouse, Inc., Esperanto Filmoj, Maere Studios and 88 Pictures for Disney+; however, the studio would remain uncredited for both productions due unknown reasons.

In April 2025, the studio alongside sister studios Walt Disney Animation Studios, Pixar Animation Studios joined Sotheby's AnimAID | The Art of Animation online auction by providing several production material of their library to benefiting local animators and their families who have been affected by the January 2025 Southern California wildfires. The auction event for all the animation divisions within The Walt Disney Company was hosted by Disney Television Animation CEO Meredith Roberts.

In August 2025, the studio announced Cars: Lightning Racers for Disney Jr. becoming the studio's third collaboration with Pixar Animation Studios.

In January 2026, the studio gave an order for a third Phineas and Ferb film for Disney Channel and Disney+. Later that month, it was announced that the studio hired former Nickelodeon and Fox Animation Studios executive Zack Olin as SVP of Development & Current Series for Disney Channel and Disney+.

In April 2026, it was announced that the studio would be hosting the Disney Kids & Family Discovers Voice Talent Search program, a nationwide talent search program to train the next generation of voice-actors. The first edition of the program launched with over 7,500 submissions for its inaugural class.

In May 2026, it was revealed that Disney Europe, Middle East & Africa Original Animation Team quietly merged with Disney Television Animation with the studio integrating productions like Dragon Striker, The Doomies and The Sunnyridge 3. The merger would promote Orion Ross and Shamik Majumdar as SVP of International Animation at the studio.

In June 2026, the studio greenlit Journey, a co-production with Higher Ground Productions and A Proud Family Wizmas, a stop-motion holiday special based on The Proud Family: Louder and Prouder for Disney+. The same month, the studio announced Mickey's Country Farm, a standalone special based on Mickey Mouse Clubhouse+.

In August 2026, it was announced that the studio greenlit Kingdom Hearts: The Series for Disney Channel and Disney+. The anime series will be a co-production with Square Enix and developer Tetsuya Nomura as part of the creative team. The same month, it was reported that a brand new Gargoyles animated series was in development at the studio.

In October 2026, the studio greenlit an animated series adaptation of Artemis Fowl for Disney Channel and Disney+.

== See also ==
- Disney General Entertainment Content, the parent unit for Disney's television and streaming operations.
  - Walt Disney Animation Japan, former subsidiary of DTVA
  - Disneytoon Studios
  - Jetix Animation Concepts, former international joint-venture between DTVA and Jetix Europe
- 20th Television Animation
