= Esperanto Filmoj =

American film production company

- Company type: Film and television production company
- Industry: Film production Television production
- Founder: Alfonso Cuarón
- Headquarters: Sherman Oaks, California, U.S.
- Key people: Alfonso Cuarón
- Products: Films; Television series
- Owner: Alfonso Cuarón

Esperanto Filmoj is a Mexican-American film and television production company based in Sherman Oaks, California. It is owned by Mexican film director Alfonso Cuarón.

The name was coined by Guillermo del Toro, who calls cinematography "the new Esperanto". Filmoj is the Esperanto word for films, and Cuarón has publicly shown his support and fascination for the constructed international language. An associated company is Producciones Anhelo, owned by Jorge Vergara and Cuarón.

In 2014, the company made its TV show Believe, with Bad Robot and Warner Bros. Television. On December 1, 2021, it was announced that Apple would order its commitment for the show Disclaimer.

== Productions ==
- Duck Season (2004, also distribution in United States)
- Chronicles (2004)
- The Assassination of Richard Nixon (2004)
- Pan's Labyrinth (2006)
- Year of the Nail (2007)
- The Possibility of Hope (2007)
- The Shock Doctrine (short, 2007)
- Rudo y Cursi (2008)
- Gravity (2013)
- Believe (2014, co-produced with Bad Robot and Warner Bros. Television)
- Roma (2018, co-produced with Participant Media and Netflix)
- The Witches (2020, co-produced with Necropia Entertainment and Warner Bros. Pictures)
- Raymond & Ray (2022, co-produced with Apple Studios)
- Disclaimer (2024, co-produced with Anonymous Content and Apple Studios)
- An Almost Christmas Story (2024, co-produced with Disney Television Animation, Titmouse, Inc., Maere Studios and 88 Pictures)

== See also ==
- Gabriela Rodríguez, producer at Esperanto Filmoj
