= Nicolás Celis (film producer) =

Mexican film producer

Nicolas Celis
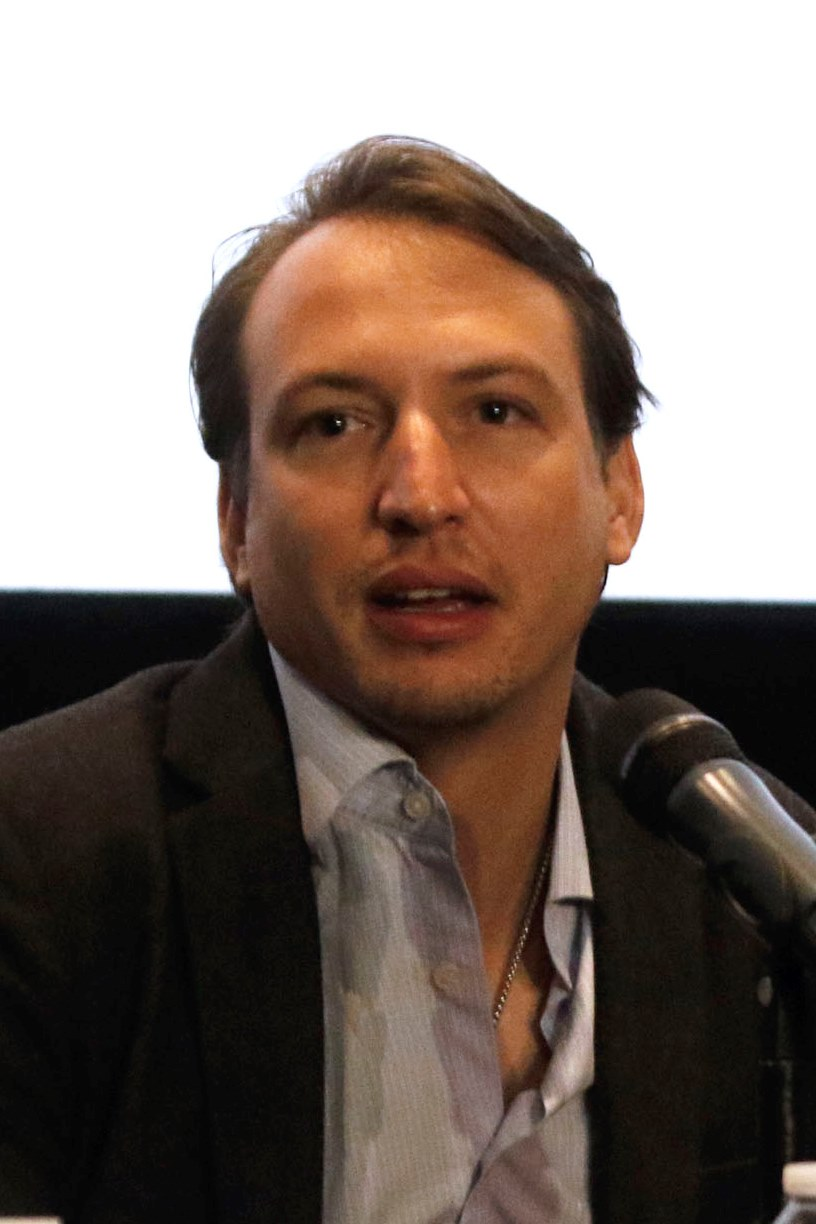
- Born: Nicolas Celis Lopez; 15 October 1986 (age 39); Mexico City, Mexico
- Occupation: Producer

Nicolás Celis (born 15 October 1986) is a Mexican film producer. He received a nomination for the Academy Awards for best film for his work as a producer in the film Roma, alongside Alfonso Cuarón and Gabriela Rodríguez. For the same film he received four BAFTA Awards, the award for Best International Film at the British Independent Film Awards, two Golden Globes and three Academy Awards In 2017, the producer was named "Talent to watch", by The Hollywood Reporter

== Career ==
Among his first works is the drama-horror feature film, We Are What We Are directed by Jorge Michel Grau, who competed for the Caméra d'Or at the 2010 Cannes Film Festival. This film had an American remake directed by Jim Mickle in 2013.

In 2015, he collaborated as executive producer of Desierto, Jonás Cuarón, with Gael García Bernal and Jeffrey Dean Morgan, movie that won he FIPRESCI prize at the Toronto Film Festival. Later on he produced Tatiana Huezo´s documentary Tempestad (2016), a film which was selected by the AMACC to compete for the Best Foreign Language Film Oscar as well as the Goya Award.

He has collaborated in several Amat Escalante films, such as Heli (2013) which won the Palme d'Or for best direction and The Untamed (2016), feature film which premiered at the Venice Film Festival.

Among his most recent co-productions is Birds of Passage, directed by Ciro Guerra and Cristina Gallego, this film was selected to open the Directors' Fortnight at Cannes. Another co-production, Holy Beasts, by directors Israel Cárdenas and Laura Amelia Guzmán, premiered in the Panorama section in the 2019 Berlinale.

He has participated in meetings and workshops like Cannes Producer's Network and Torino FilmLab, among others. In 2019, he served on the main jury for the Shanghai International Film Festival.

== Filmography ==
- Ex-Husbands (2023) - producer
- Holy Beasts (2019) - producer
- Roma (2018) - producer
- Birds of Passage (2018) - producer
- My Brother (2017) - producer
- To Die In the Desert (2017) - producer
- Tempestad (2016) - producer
- The Untamed (2016) - executive producer
- Desierto (2015) - executive producer
- Heli (2013) - line producer
- Hilda (2015) - producer
- The Tiniest Place (2011) - producer
- We Are What We Are (2010) - producer
