= Roma (2018 film) =

2018 film by Alfonso Cuarón

- Theatrical release poster
- Directed by: Alfonso Cuarón
- Written by: Alfonso Cuarón
- Produced by: Gabriela Rodríguez; Alfonso Cuarón; Nicolás Celis
- Starring: Yalitza Aparicio; Marina de Tavira; Jorge Antonio Guerrero
- Cinematography: Alfonso Cuarón
- Edited by: Alfonso Cuarón; Adam Gough
- Production companies: Espectáculos Fílmicos El Coyúl; Pimienta Films; Participant Media; Esperanto-Filmoj
- Distributed by: Espectáculos Fílmicos El Coyúl (Mexico); Netflix (Worldwide)
- Release dates: 30 August 2018 (Venice); 21 November 2018 (Mexico and United States); 14 December 2018 (Netflix)
- Running time: 135 minutes
- Countries: Mexico; United States
- Languages: Spanish; Mixtec
- Budget: $15 million
- Box office: $5.1 million

Roma is a 2018 historical drama film written, produced, and directed by Alfonso Cuarón, who also served as cinematographer and co-editor. Set in 1970 and 1971, Roma follows the life of a live-in indigenous Mixteca housekeeper of an upper-middle-class Mexican family. It is a semi-autobiographical take on Cuarón's upbringing in Mexico City's Colonia Roma neighborhood. The film stars Yalitza Aparicio and Marina de Tavira. It is an international co-production between Mexico and the United States.

Roma premiered on 30 August 2018 at the 75th Venice International Film Festival, where it won the Golden Lion. It began a limited theatrical run in the United States on 21 November 2018, before streaming on Netflix in the U.S. and other territories starting on 14 December 2018.

Roma received a number of accolades, with ten nominations at the 91st Academy Awards, among them Best Picture, Best Original Screenplay, Best Actress (Aparicio) and Best Supporting Actress (de Tavira). It became the first Mexican entry to win Best Foreign Language Film, and the first film to win both Best Cinematography and Best Director for the same person in a single night. It also won two awards at the 76th Golden Globe Awards, four awards (including Best Picture) at the 24th Critics' Choice Awards, and four awards (including Best Film) at the 72nd British Academy Film Awards. Since its release, it has been cited among the best films of the 2010s and the 21st century.

== Plot ==
In 1970, Cleodegaria "Cleo" Gutiérrez is a Mixtec live-in maid in an upper-middle-class household in Mexico City's Colonia Roma neighborhood. The household consists of the mother, Sofía; the father, Antonio; their four school-aged children, Pepe, Sofi, Toño and Paco; and Sofía's mother, Teresa. Antonio, a medical doctor, often leaves for business conferences, but Sofía's distressed reactions to his absences suggest he is having an extramarital affair.

Meanwhile, Cleo believes she might be pregnant. She tells her boyfriend, Fermín, who pretends to be supportive but immediately abandons her at a movie theatre. She nervously reveals her news to Sofía, who provides emotional comfort and takes her to the hospital, confirming her pregnancy. Sofía then takes Cleo and the children to a family friend's hacienda for New Year celebrations. Recent tensions over land in the area arise, and a large forest fire erupts that the partygoers help extinguish.

Back in the city, Cleo sees Antonio and a young woman flirting on the street. She looks for Fermín, traveling to an impoverished district on the edge of the city, where she finds him training at a military-style camp run by Professor Zovek. Fermín denies that her baby is his, threatening to beat Cleo and their child if she talks to him again.

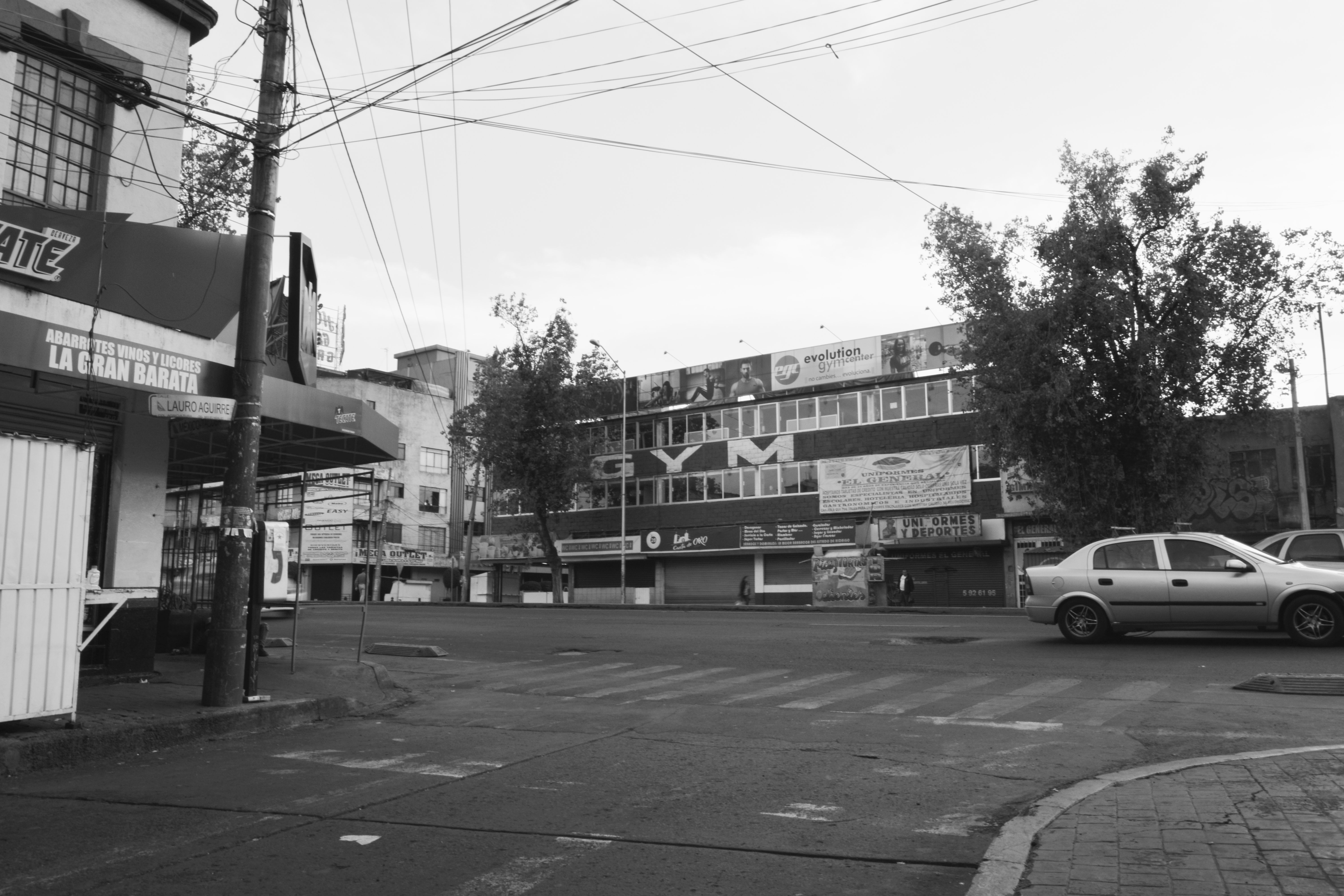
Ribera de San Cosme avenue and Lauro Aguirre street, where the Corpus Christi massacre occurred. The building that was the furniture store and school in the film is now a gymnasium.

Cleo returns to the city, and the increasingly distraught Sofía tries unsuccessfully to conceal her husband's infidelity from their children. With the baby almost due, Teresa takes Cleo shopping for a crib downtown. Suddenly a student protest outside the store turns into the Corpus Christi massacre of 10 June 1971 as a paramilitary group, Los Halcones ("the Falcons"), attacks the protesters. The militants chase a student into the store and murder him. Fermín, appearing as one of Los Halcones, points a gun at Cleo and Teresa before wordlessly exiting. Then Cleo's water breaks. The violence in the streets slows traffic and her attempt to get to the hospital. When she arrives, Antonio briefly appears, reassures her, then makes an excuse to leave. She cries in agony as her baby girl is delivered stillborn.

Later, Sofía takes Cleo and the children on a family outing to the beaches at Tuxpan. Sofía tells her children that she and their father are separating and that the outing is giving him time to collect his belongings from their home. At the beach, a strong current almost drowns Sofi and Paco, but Cleo wades in and saves them, despite not knowing how to swim. Sofía and the children affirm their love for Cleo, all of them holding each other and crying, while Cleo confesses that she did not want her baby to be born. The group returns home to find the house reorganized, and Cleo prepares a load of clothes for washing.

== Cast ==
- Yalitza Aparicio as Cleodegaria "Cleo" Gutiérrez, one of the family's maids
- Marina de Tavira as Sofía, the mother of the family
- Fernando Grediaga as Antonio, Sofía's absent husband
- Jorge Antonio Guerrero as Fermín, Cleo's lover
- Marco Graf as Pepe, the youngest child of the family
- Daniela Demesa as Sofi, the second child of the family, and only daughter
- Diego Cortina Autrey as Toño, the eldest child of the family
- Carlos Peralta as Paco, the third child of the family
- Nancy García as Adela, Cleo's friend, and one of the family's maids
- Verónica García as Teresa, Sofía's mother
- José Manuel Guerrero Mendoza as Ramón, Adela's lover
- Latin Lover as Professor Zovek
- Zarela Lizbeth Chinolla Arellano as Velez
- Clementina Guadarrama as Benita
- Nicolás Peréz Taylor Félix as Beto
- Kjartan Halvorsen as Ove Larsen
- Jennifer Armour as Leslie Matos

== Production ==
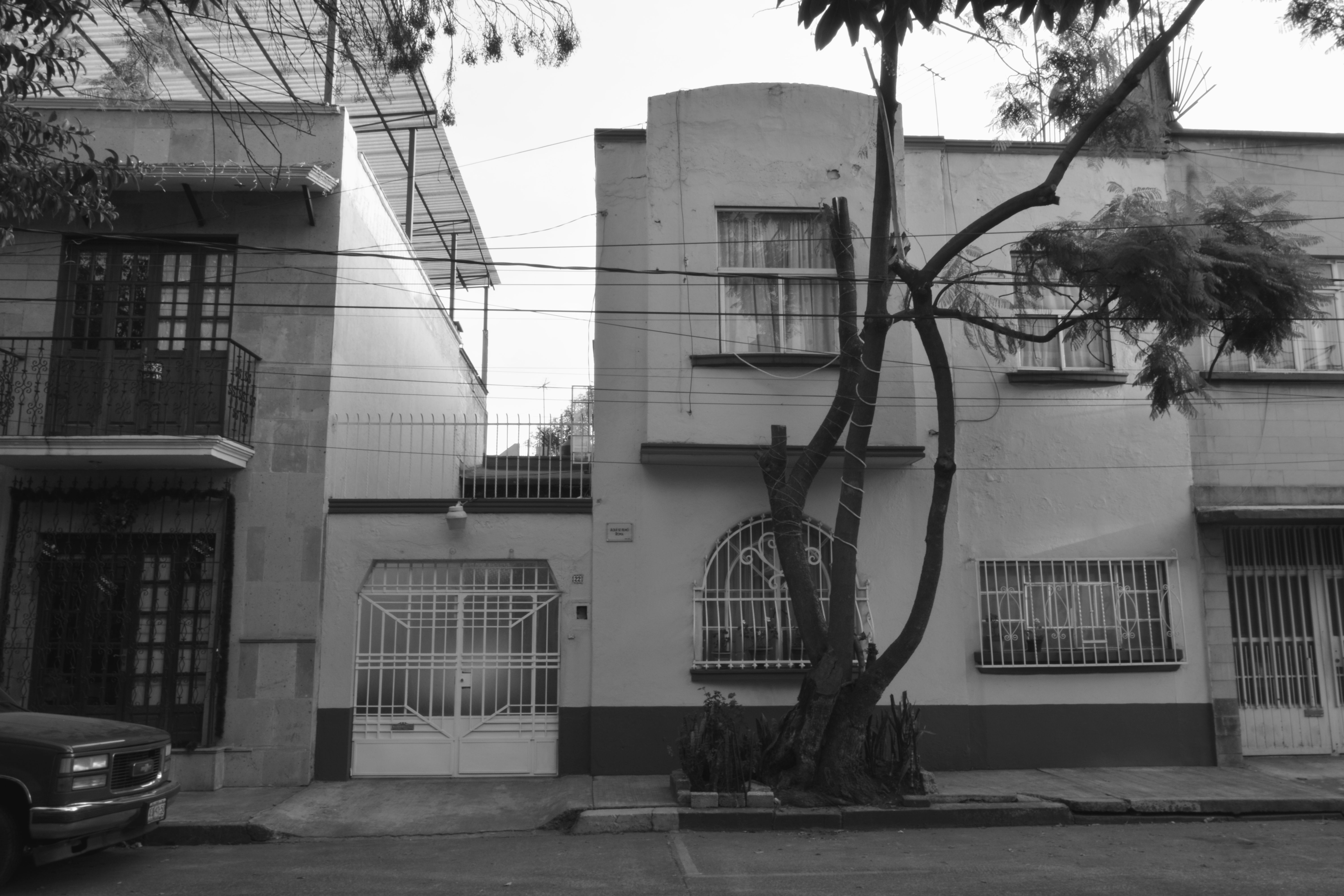
22 Tepeji Street, Colonia Roma – the house where the film was shot

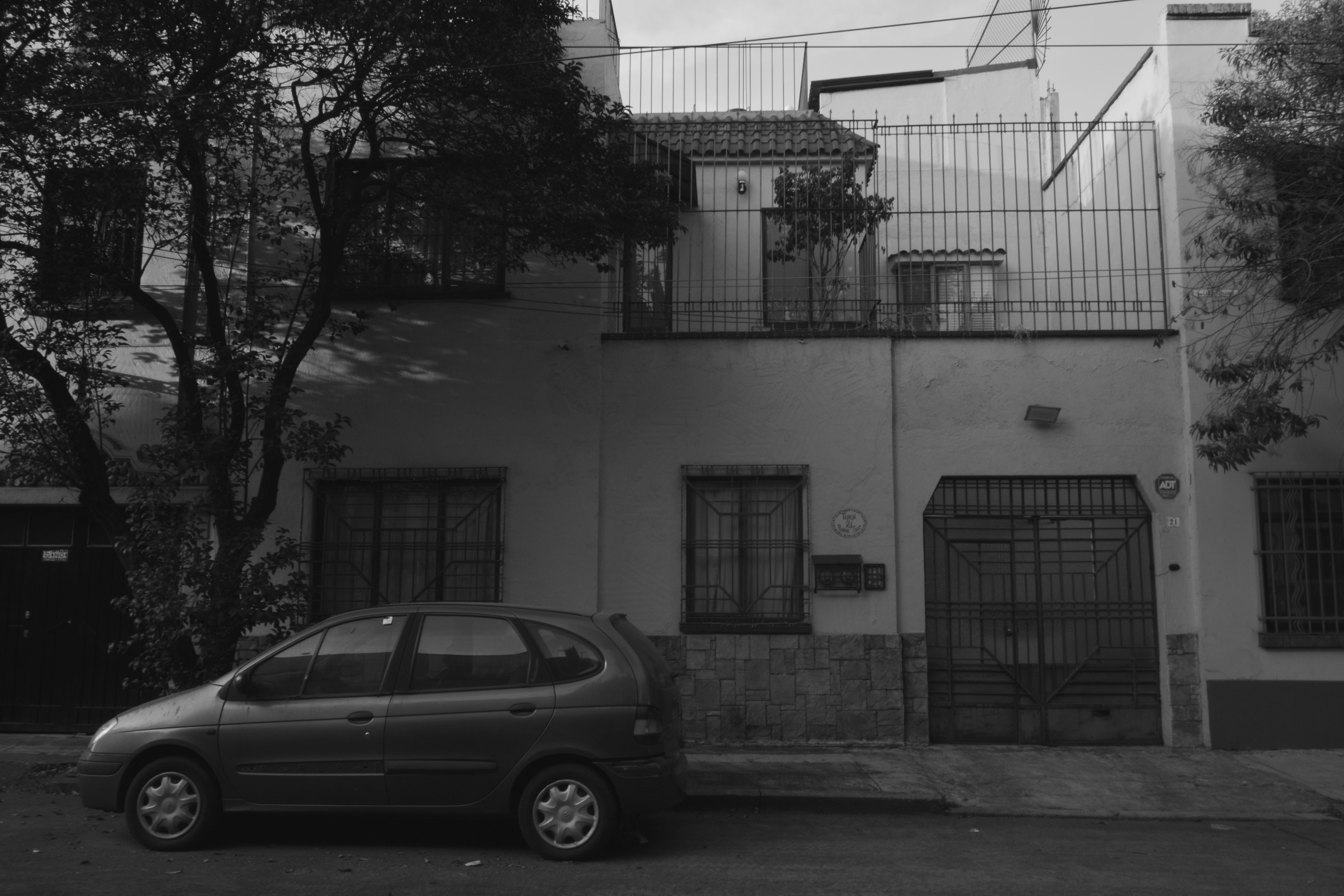
21 Tepeji Street, Colonia Roma – the original house of Cuarón's family, located opposite the filming location house

On 8 September 2016, it was announced that Alfonso Cuarón would write and direct a project focusing on a Mexican family living in Mexico City in the 1970s. Production was set to begin in fall 2016 by his production company, Esperanto Filmoj, and Participant Media. The film was produced by Cuarón, Gabriela Rodríguez, and Nicolás Celis. Filming took place from 27 November 2016 to 14 March 2017. Cuarón said he "just wrote the script without looking back. I started page one, I finish it, I never read it again as a whole. I never share it with anyone."

Roma was shot in sequence, which Yalitza Aparicio, who plays Cleo, said helped her. She was most terrified by the scene on the beach, as she—like her character—could not swim. Before being cast, Aparicio, who had recently completed graduate training in preschool education, had no acting experience or formal training in acting. She has joked that the only "acting" she has ever done was lying to her parents and teachers.

Filming took place on location throughout Mexico City, as Cuarón felt shooting on soundstages would be difficult for first-time actors. The movie theatre serving as a recurring location was the Teatro Metropólitan, the site of the 2001 premiere of Y tu mamá también, Cuarón's hitherto latest Mexican film.

Roma was released as a black and white film. It was filmed in color and converted to black and white in the post-production process. “I wanted to do a modern film that looks into the past,” Cuarón said.

=== Robbery on set ===
On 1 November 2016, the crew of Roma was the target of a robbery. According to the studio, "two women were hit, five crew members were hospitalized, and cellphones, wallets, and jewelry were stolen" during the attack. The crew reportedly arrived to set up filming for the day when a group of city workers approached the crew and tried to shut down filming. The crew said they had permission to film, but the workers persisted and a brawl broke out between the groups.

== Release ==
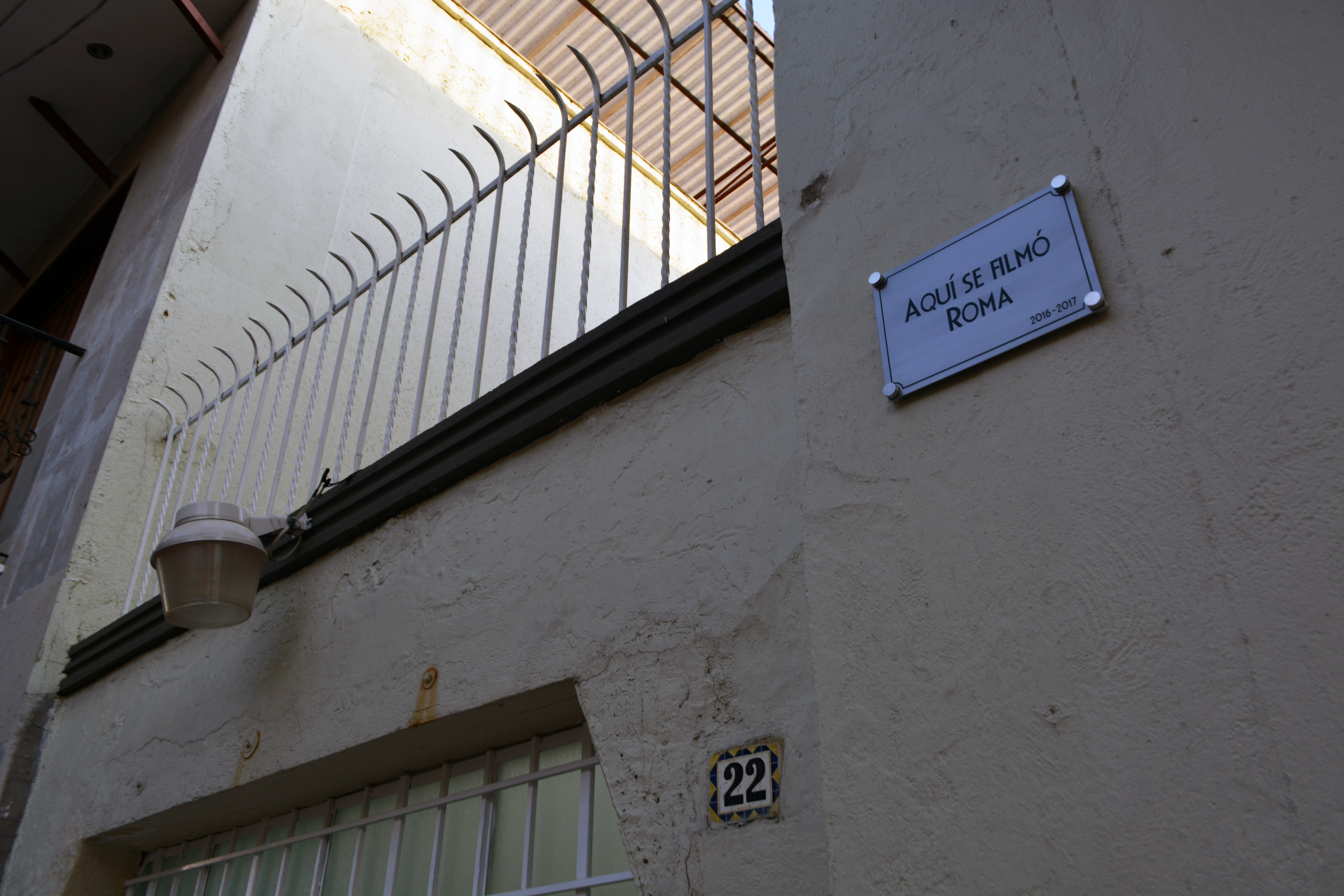
Plaque at Tepeji 22 house commemorating it as a filming location

In April 2018, it was announced that Netflix had acquired the film's distribution rights. Netflix movie chief Scott Stuber acquired the rights based on 12 minutes of footage he was shown.

A teaser trailer was released on 25 July 2018.

The film had its world premiere at the 75th Venice International Film Festival on 30 August 2018, and made its North American debut the next day at the Telluride Film Festival. The film also played at the Toronto International Film Festival. It screened at the San Sebastián International Film Festival on 27 September 2018, the New York Film Festival on 5 October 2018, and the New Orleans Film Festival as the Centerpiece Film on 22 October 2018. It was released at independent theatres in Mexico on 21 November, though the Cinépolis and Cinemex chains refused, as they demanded a longer exclusivity window than Netflix offered. Released digitally on 14 December, the film was watched by 3.2 million households between January and February 2019, with a peak of 418,000 viewers on 23 February, the day before the Academy Awards.

After Roma was nominated for Best Picture at the 91st Academy Awards, AMC Theatres and Regal Cinemas both issued statements that Roma would not be part of the lineup at either chain's annual Best Picture showcase. AMC said this was because it never received a license from Netflix to screen Roma in its theaters. Both theaters chains have refused to screen films from Netflix due to their policies that require a minimum of 90 days between theatrical release and home viewing.

The film's eligibility for the Academy Awards was a matter of controversy, since despite its limited theatrical release, many believed it to have been made for home viewing. In March 2019, Steven Spielberg expressed disapproval of streaming films being eligible for Academy Awards, and the timing of his comments led many to believe they were a response to Roma, though he did not mention the film by name.

The film received the biggest promotional campaign in Netflix's history, with anywhere from $25 million to $50 million in advertisements (Netflix insisted on the former figure and its rivals on the latter). One unique tactic included sending out thousands of six-pound Roma coffee table books (worth $175) to awards voters, which led a consultant to say "the shipping charges cost more than some movies' advertising budgets".

== Reception ==
=== Box office ===
Netflix has not publicly disclosed box-office figures for Roma, but sources deduced that the film made $90,000–120,000 from three theaters in its opening weekend, 23–25 November, and $200,000 over the five-day Thanksgiving frame, including selling out theaters in Los Angeles and New York City. Had the results been officially reported, its approximate venue average of $66,600 would have ranked among the best ever for a foreign-language film. In its second weekend of theatrical release, the film expanded to 17 theaters. IndieWire estimated the film grossed $110,000 from four of them, including selling out in San Francisco, and that the film would "easily be the best grossing subtitled film" of 2018. In its third weekend, the film made another estimated $500,000 from 100 theaters, for a running total of $900,000.

Despite being released on Netflix on 14 December, the film expanded to 145 theaters and grossed an estimated $362,000 for a four-week total of $1.4 million. It made another $300,000 the next week and $150,000 the week after that. By its ninth week of release, the film had made an estimated $2.8 million. In the weekend following the announcement of its 10 Oscar nominations, Roma grossed another $175,000 from around 80 theaters, pushing it past $3 million, the first foreign-language film to do so domestically since Ida in 2013.

=== Critical response ===
On review aggregator Rotten Tomatoes, Roma holds an approval rating of 96% based on 399 reviews, with an average rating of 9.0/10. The website's critical consensus reads, "Roma finds writer-director Alfonso Cuarón in complete, enthralling command of his visual craft—and telling the most powerfully personal story of his career." On Metacritic, the film has a weighted average score of 96 out of 100, based on 50 critics, indicating "universal acclaim". It is the 56th highest-rated film of all time on the site, and the best-reviewed of 2018.

In The Guardian, Peter Bradshaw wrote: "Roma is thrilling, engrossing, moving—and just entirely amazing, an adjectival pileup of wonder. He has reached back into his own childhood to create an intensely personal story." Manohla Dargis of The New York Times called the film "an expansive, emotional portrait of life buffeted by violent forces, and a masterpiece" and praised Cuarón's use of "intimacy and monumentality to express the depths of ordinary life".

Slavoj Žižek argued that people were appreciating the film for the wrong reasons, claiming that people were appreciating Cleo's grace without seeing how she must break free from the moral constraints placed upon her.

=== Accolades ===
Roma won the Golden Lion for Best Film at the Venice International Film Festival. At the Toronto International Film Festival, it was named second runner-up for the People's Choice Award.

The film received 10 nominations for the 91st Academy Awards, including Best Picture—tying with The Favourite as the most-nominated film. It is the first film distributed primarily by a streaming service to be nominated for Best Picture. It was tied with Crouching Tiger, Hidden Dragon (2000) for the most Oscar nominations received by a film not in English until Emilia Pérez, in French, received 13 in 2025. It won three Academy Awards, including Best Foreign Language Film, becoming the first Mexican film to win this honor.

Roma received American Film Institute's 2018 AFI Special Award, as it was not eligible for AFI Movies of the Year due to its non-U.S. status. Time magazine and the New York Film Critics Circle named it the best film of 2018, and the National Board of Review named it one of the ten best films of 2018.

The February 2020 issue of New York lists Roma as one of the Best Movies That Lost Best Picture at the Oscars. In 2021, members of Writers Guild of America West (WGAW) and Writers Guild of America, East (WGAE) voted its screenplay 62nd in WGA’s 101 Greatest Screenplays of the 21st Century (So Far). In June 2025, the film ranked 46th on The New York Times list of "The 100 Best Movies of the 21st Century" and was one of the films voted for the "Readers' Choice" edition of the list, finishing at number 124. In July 2025, it ranked 21st on Rolling Stone's list of "The 100 Best Movies of the 21st Century".

== Home media ==
On 15 November 2019, it was confirmed that Roma would be receiving a DVD and Blu-ray release from The Criterion Collection, marking the first time a Netflix original film was added to the library, and one of the rare times that Netflix had permitted one of their films for physical media release. Netflix described the announcement as "such an honor". To coincide with the Criterion Collection release, in February 2020, Netflix released a behind-the-scenes documentary named Road to Roma.

== See also ==
- List of Mexican submissions for the Academy Award for Best Foreign Language Film
- List of submissions to the 91st Academy Awards for Best Foreign Language Film
