= The Turning Door =

Upcoming animated film by Nicholas Ashe Bateman

- Directed by: Nicholas Ashe Bateman
- Screenplay by: Nicholas Ashe Bateman
- Produced by: Christine D'Souza; Hunter Hall; Nicholas Ashe Bateman; Laura Rister
- Starring: Pippa Kelly; Javier Bardem; Marion Cotillard; Vanessa Redgrave; Alicia Vikander; Jamie Dornan; Jodie Turner-Smith; Bill Nighy; Gillian Anderson; Anna von Hausswolff
- Music by: Claire Givens; Nicholas Ashe Bateman
- Production companies: After Hours; Maere Studios; Esme Grace Pictures
- Country: United States
- Language: English

The Turning Door is an upcoming American independent animated fantasy film written and directed by Nicholas Ashe Bateman. It stars the voices of Pippa Kelly, Javier Bardem, Marion Cotillard, Vanessa Redgrave, Alicia Vikander, Jamie Dornan, Jodie Turner-Smith, Bill Nighy, Anna von Hausswolff, and Gillian Anderson. The film follows a young girl who finds a magical box hidden in her parents' closet that leads to another world called The Turning. The film is scheduled to be released in 2027.

== Premise ==
The story follows Ariadlyn, a young girl who finds a magical box hidden in her parents' closet that leads to another world called The Turning.

== Cast ==
- Pippa Kelly as Ariadlyn
- Javier Bardem
- Marion Cotillard
- Vanessa Redgrave
- Alicia Vikander
- Jamie Dornan
- Jodie Turner-Smith
- Bill Nighy
- Gillian Anderson
- Anna von Hausswolff

== Production ==
=== Development ===
In December 2023, director Nicholas Ashe Bateman and composer Claire Givens started working on the animated film The Turning Door. The score was composed by Givens and Bateman, who also wrote original songs for the film.

On October 30, 2025, it was announced that production had begun and that Alicia Vikander, Jamie Dornan, Jodie Turner-Smith, Bill Nighy and Gillian Anderson had joined the voice cast.

On September 2, 2026, it was announced that Javier Bardem, Marion Cotillard and Vanessa Redgrave had joined the voice cast in starring roles, along with Pippa Kelly voicing the lead character, Ariadlyn, and that Swedish singer Anna von Hausswolff had also joined the cast in an unnamed role. It was also announced that the cast will perform original songs in the film.

The Turning Door is an independent film produced by US companies After Hours, Maere Studios and Esme Grace Pictures, with the UK's Mister Smith Entertainment handling international sales. The film's producers are Bateman, Hunter Hall, Christine D'Souza, and Laura Rister. Footage from the film was introduced to foreign buyers at TIFF Market during the 2026 Toronto International Film Festival.

=== Influences ===
Bateman has cited illustrators N. C. Wyeth, Maxfield Parrish, Howard Pyle, and the Pre-Raphaelites as influences for the film.

== Release ==
The film is scheduled to be released in 2027.
