= The Great Seduction =

- Netflix release poster
- Directed by: Celso R. García
- Written by: Celso R. García; Luciana Herrera Caso
- Produced by: Nicolás Celis; Sebastian Celis
- Starring: Memo Villegas; Pierre Louis; Yalitza Aparicio
- Cinematography: Santiago Sanchez
- Edited by: Ana García
- Music by: Billy Martin
- Production companies: Pimienta Films; Cuadernos de Cine
- Distributed by: Pimienta Films; Netflix
- Release dates: August 23, 2023 (Limited); August 30, 2023 (Netflix)
- Running time: 94 minutes
- Country: Mexico
- Language: Spanish

The Great Seduction (Spanish: La gran seducción) is a 2023 Mexican comedy film directed by Celso R. García who co-wrote with Luciana Herrera Caso. It is a Spanish-language remake of the 2003 film Seducing Doctor Lewis. It stars Memo Villegas, Pierre Louis, and Yalitza Aparicio. It is about the inhabitants of a forgotten fishing village where they seek to save it by "seducing" a doctor to the island with lies.

== Synopsis ==
On the fishing island of Santa María del Mar, industrialization is taking place that put an end to economic activity. However, a fish packing company seeks to establish itself in the town, giving hope to the inhabitants, but the packing company asks for a requirement to establish itself: a doctor who lives on the island. Thus begins the journey of Germán and the rest of the inhabitants to "seduce" the city doctor Mateo.

== Cast ==
The actors participating in this film are:

- Memo Villegas as Germán
- Pierre Louis as Mateo
- Yalitza Aparicio as Ana
- Mercedes Hernández as Alba
- Eligio Meléndez as Simón
- Julio Casado
- Héctor Jiménez
- Mateo Negrete

== Release ==
The Great Seduction had a limited theatrical release on August 23, 2023, then released worldwide on August 30, 2023, on Netflix.
