= An Almost Christmas Story =

2024 animated short film

- Release poster
- Directed by: David Lowery
- Screenplay by: Jack Thorne; David Lowery
- Story by: Alfonso Cuarón; Jack Thorne
- Produced by: Alfonso Cuarón; Gabriela Rodríguez; David Lowery
- Starring: Cary Christopher; Estella Madrigal; Jim Gaffigan; Mamoudou Athie; Alex Ross Perry; Gianna Joseph; Phil Rosenthal; Natasha Lyonne; John C. Reilly
- Cinematography: David A. Ross; Z. Scott Schaefer
- Edited by: Mike Melendi
- Music by: Daniel Hart
- Production companies: Disney Television Animation; Esperanto Filmoj; Titmouse, Inc. Maere Studios; 88 Pictures
- Distributed by: Disney+
- Release dates: October 14, 2024 (HIFF); November 15, 2024 (United States)
- Running time: 25 minutes
- Country: United States
- Language: English

An Almost Christmas Story is a 2024 animated short film directed by David Lowery, who produced and co-wrote alongside Alfonso Cuarón.

== Synopsis ==
A young owl named Moon unexpectedly finds himself in a Christmas tree destined for Rockefeller Center. In his attempts to get home, he forms a bond with a lost girl named Luna.

== Cast ==
- Cary Christopher as Moon
- Estella Madrigal as Luna
- Jim Gaffigan as Papa Owl
- Mamoudou Athie as Pelly
- Alex Ross Perry as Dave the Dog
- Gianna Joseph as Peaky
- Philip Rosenthal as Punt
- Natasha Lyonne as Pat
- John C. Reilly as The Folk Singer

== Production ==
In September 2024, it was announced that Disney+ would release An Almost Christmas Story, which would be the third and final holiday short produced by Alfonso Cuarón for the streaming service, after Le pupille (2022) and The Shepherd (2023). It was loosely based on the story of Rocky, an owl who was discovered and rescued from the Rockefeller Center Christmas Tree in 2020. John C. Reilly, in his role as "The Folk Singer", performs four songs in the short, two of which are original.

David Lowery went to Nicholas Ashe Bateman, founder of Maere Studios to design and make the visual effects of the short. Maere Studios created a complete CG process to emulate different types of animation, including stop motion and miniatures, all told through a world of cardboard. Disney+ released a behind the scenes video showing part of the visual process.

== Music ==
An Almost Christmas Story

Soundtrack album by John C. Reilly and Daniel Hart
- Released: December 13, 2024
- Length: 10:50
- Label: Walt Disney
- Producer: Daniel Hart

John C. Reilly chronology
Walk Hard: The Dewey Cox Story (2007)	An Almost Christmas Story (2024)

Daniel Hart chronology
Interview with the Vampire: Season 2 (Original Television Series Soundtrack) (2024)	An Almost Christmas Story (2024)

Singles from An Almost Christmas Story
- 1. "It's Christmas Today" / "The Spirit of Christmas" Released: November 15, 2024

The short features four songs performed by John C. Reilly; two of the tracks are original songs composed by Daniel Hart. The deluxe edition of the soundtrack was released on December 13, 2024.

An Almost Christmas Story (Original Soundtrack) track listing
No.	Title	Writer(s)	Length
1.	"Ar Fa La La Lo"	Daniel Hart; Traditional	3:09
2.	"It's Christmas Today"	Hart	1:58
3.	"In the Bleak Midwinter"	Christina Rossetti; Hart; Gustav Holst; Traditional	1:43
4.	"The Spirit of Christmas"	Hart	2:00
5.	"The Holly and the Ivy"	Hart; Traditional	1:58

== Release ==
An Almost Christmas Story premiered at the Hamptons International Film Festival on October 14, 2024. It was also screened at the Animation Is Film Festival that same month. It premiered on Disney+ on November 15, 2024.

== Reception ==
=== Viewership ===
Analytics company Samba TV, which gathers viewership data from certain smart TVs and content providers, calculated that An Almost Christmas Story was the tenth most-watched winter holiday title, being watched by an estimated 166,660 households in the United States.

=== Critical response ===
On the review aggregator website Rotten Tomatoes, 100% of 8 critics gave the series a positive review, with an average rating of 8.2/10.

John Serba of Decider said that An Almost Christmas Story blends joy and melancholy with a poignant yet unsentimental tone. He praised its whimsical visual design, nostalgic sepia-toned palette, and thematic use of three-dimensional puppets for main characters alongside cardboard-cutout minor characters. Serba found the humor and the bond between Moon and Luna to be charming and understated, describing the film as "pure and simple and wholesome." Katie Doll of Comic Book Resources found that An Almost Christmas Story effectively blends nostalgia and innovation, creating a heartfelt holiday experience. She praised the film’s unique visual style, which combines stop-motion animation with elements of cardboard and wood to evoke classic Rankin/Bass holiday specials while maintaining modern fluidity. Doll found the story simple yet touching. She stated that the voice performances, particularly Jim Gaffigan as Papa Owl and John C. Reilly as the Folk Singer, enhance the emotional depth and humor of the narrative. Doll highlighted the film's inclusivity, noting Luna's role as an amputee and Moon's resilience, which convey themes of empathy and strength.

== Awards and nominations ==
- 2026: Children's & Family Emmy for Outstanding Animated Special (nominated)
- 2026: Children's & Family Emmy for Outstanding Single Role Voice Performer in a Children’s or Young Teen Program: John C. Reilly (nominated)
- 2026: Children's & Family Emmy for Outstanding Editing for an Animated Program (nominated)
- 2026: Children's & Family Emmy for Outstanding Casting for an Animated Program (nominated)
- 2025: Special Jury Prize, Annecy International Animation Film Festival, recognizing exceptional achievement in animation storytelling.
