= Presencias =

- Vix+ release poster
- Directed by: Luis Mandoki
- Written by: Olivia Bond
- Produced by: Alexa Aroesty; Cher Constantine; Santiago de la Paz; Luis Mandoki
- Starring: Alberto Ammann; Yalitza Aparicio
- Cinematography: Philip Lozano
- Edited by: Pablo Barbieri Carrera
- Music by: Camille Mandoki
- Production company: Videocine
- Distributed by: Vix+
- Release date: September 7, 2022 (Vix+)
- Running time: 120 minutes
- Country: Mexico
- Language: Spanish

Presencias (lit. 'Presences') is a 2022 Mexican horror thriller film directed by Luis Mandoki and written by Olivia Bond. Starring Alberto Ammann and Yalitza Aparicio. It premiered in the United States, Mexico, and Spanish-speaking territories on September 7, 2022, on Vix+.

== Synopsis ==
Víctor Constantino returns to his father's cabin where he spent a good part of his childhood and where his younger sister drowned. Now it is his duty to sell it, but he did not expect someone (or something) to murder his pregnant wife. After this event, Victor does not remember what happened, but he is determined to find the person responsible along with Paulina, an independent young woman with good intentions, and María, who was his nanny.

== Cast ==
The actors participating in this film are:

- Alberto Ammann as Víctor
- Yalitza Aparicio as Paulina
- Andrea Santibañez as Alicia
- Leo Danse Alos as Almita
- Ariel Bonilla as Doctor Juan Esquivel
- Analy Castro as Policewoman
- Cher Constantine as Dr. Dávila
- Adriana Deangelis as Adela
- Emelia Levy as Creature
- Daniel Mandoki as Manolo
- Fermín Martínez as Juárez
- Raúl Orozco as Priest
- Norma Pablo as Pilar
- Angelina Peláez as María
- Alisson Santiago as Dionisia
- Gerardo Taracena as Don Jaime
- Marco Antonio Treviño as Don Julio
- Josué Maychi

== Production ==
Principal photography began at the beginning of March 2021 and ended in mid-March of the same year in Pueblo Mágico of Tlalpujahua, in Michoacán and Ajusco, Mexico City.

== Reception ==
=== Critical reception ===
Edgar Apanco from Cine Premiere highlights the technical and visual aspects, however, he criticizes the story full of clichés that submerge the production, but is grateful that it does not lengthen unnecessarily. Kevin de León from Tomatazos also criticizes the weak script that uses genre clichés that make it more predictable and confusing, which tries to redeem itself at its climax but decides to speed up the story and bring it to an end. Even so, the visual proposal stands out in terms of photography, lighting and production design, which makes the experience more enjoyable.

=== Accolades ===
Year	Award	Category	Recipient	Result	Ref.
2023	Apulia Horror International Film Festival	Best Feature Film	Luis Mandoki	Won	
2023	Diosas de Plata	Best Film	Cher Constantine & Luis Mandoki	Nominated	
2023	Diosas de Plata	Best Direction	Luis Mandoki	Nominated	
2023	Diosas de Plata	Best Screenplay	Cher Constantine	Nominated	
2023	Diosas de Plata	Best Supporting Actor	Daniel Mandoki	Nominated	
2023	Diosas de Plata	Best Supporting Actress	Yalitza Aparicio	Nominated	
2023	Diosas de Plata	Best Actor in a Minor Role	Fermín Martínez	Nominated	
2023	Diosas de Plata	Best Actress in a Minor Role	Angelina Peláez	Won	
2023	Diosas de Plata	Best Cinematography	Philip Lozano	Nominated	
2023	Diosas de Plata	Best Editing	Pablo Barbieri Carrera	Nominated	
