= The Wanting Mare =

2020 science fiction film

- Film poster
- Directed by: Nicholas Ashe Bateman
- Written by: Nicholas Ashe Bateman
- Produced by: Nicholas Ashe Bateman, David A. Ross, Z. Scott Schaefer, Lawrence Inglee
- Starring: Jordan Monaghan, Nicholas Ashe Bateman, Edmond Cofie, Christine Kellogg-Darrin, Josh Clark, Yasamin Keshtkar
- Cinematography: David A. Ross
- Edited by: Nicholas Ashe Bateman
- Music by: Aaron Boudreaux
- Production company: Maere Studios
- Distributed by: Gravitas Ventures
- Release dates: May 22, 2020 (Chattanooga Film Festival); February 5, 2021 (United States)
- Running time: 89 minutes
- Country: United States
- Language: English

The Wanting Mare is a 2020 science fiction fantasy film written and directed by Nicholas Ashe Bateman.

== Plot ==
In a post-apocalyptic realm called Anmaere, an annual drive ships wild horses from a rundown city called Whithren to another, far-off city, Levithen. Many denizens of Whithren hope to board the boat with the horses and travel to Levithen, which they believe holds a more promising future for them.

== Cast ==
- Jordan Monaghan - Moira
- Ashleigh Nutt - young Moira
- Christine Kellogg-Darrin - old Moira
- Nicholas Ashe Bateman - young Lawrence
- Josh Clark - old Lawrence
- Yasamin Keshtkar - Eirah
- Edmond Cofie - Hadeon
- Maxine Muster - Elien

== Development ==
The Wanting Mare is Bateman's first feature-length film; he did not attend film school, had no visual effects training, and worked independently on the film's development, part of which was funded through a campaign on the crowdsourcing website Indiegogo. Bateman credits the earliest inspirations of the film to be Emily Brontë's Wuthering Heights.

The film took over five years to make, and has over 500 visual effects shots. Cinematographer David A. Ross used a Sony A7SII with Anamorphic lenses. Bateman shot much of the film in a storage unit in Paterson, New Jersey; while other shots were filmed along the coast of the northeastern United States and in Nova Scotia, Canada.

The film was largely shot on green-screen and composited in After Effects and Blender. The film utilizes many digital matte paintings done by the director.

During the five years of production, Bateman lived in the office space that was used to edit the film and create the visual effects. During this time, the group of Bateman, David A. Ross, Z. Scott Schaefer, and Cassandra Louise Baker founded the visual effects company Maere Studios.

Shane Carruth was involved as an executive producer for a time, but he removed his name from the project in 2020 after accusations of abuse against him were made public.

== Reception ==
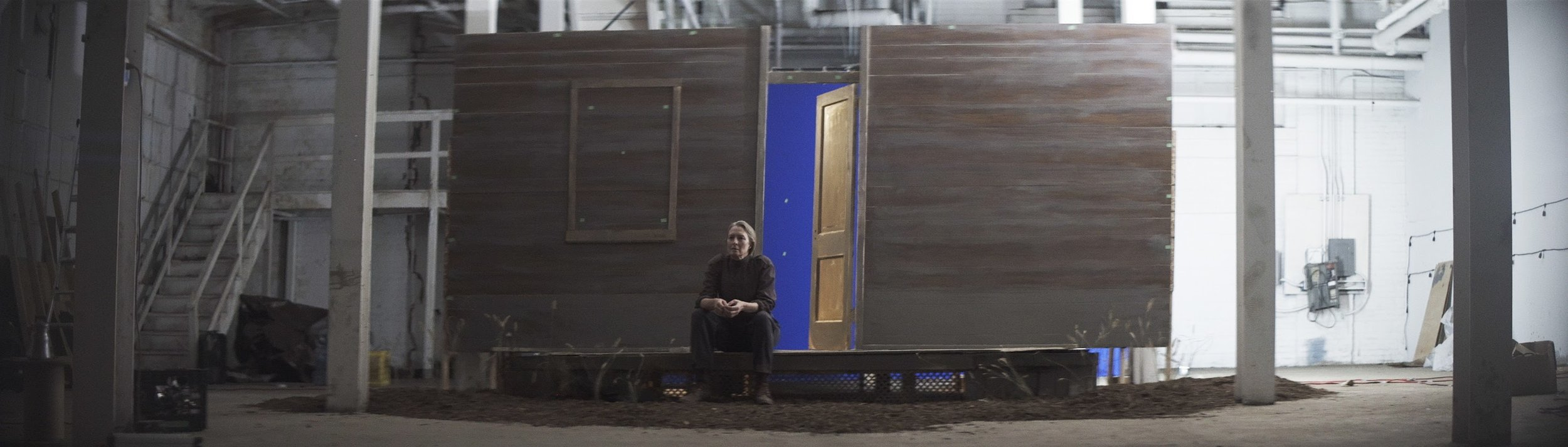
A behind-the-scenes still from the documentary 'Making The Wanting Mare'

In his review, Eric Kohn of Indiewire called the film 'The Most Intriguing World-Building since 'The Matrix'.

Nerdist called it a 'dreamy, dazzling debut' and Variety's Mark Keizer said in his review: "the film’s one unmistakable thrill is knowing its expansive world is the brainchild of one person, a first-time director who dropped out of college, never went to film school and worked for more than five years to fulfill a vision."

The film received a positive review from Wired, The Los Angeles Times, RogerEbert.com and mixed reviews from IndieWire, RogerEbert.com, and Polygon.
