= Gabriela Rodríguez (producer) =

Venezuelan film producer based in London (born 1980)

Gabriela Rodríguez (born February 23, 1980) is a Venezuelan film producer based in London. She received an Academy Award nomination for Best Picture for her work on Roma, and was the first Latin American woman to earn a nomination in that category. She also won two BAFTAs and a British Independent Film Award, as well as other nominations for her production work on the film.

== Early life and education ==
Rodríguez grew up in Venezuela. Influenced by her parents' love of film, she was interested in the subject from a young age and decided it would be her career. She moved to Boston to attend Suffolk University and took additional courses in filmmaking at New York University during the summers. Having decided to pursue film production, she interned for a television production company in New York after graduation.

When her mother was on her way to New York for a visit, a chance encounter led to an opportunity for Rodríguez to interview for Alfonso Cuarón's production company, Esperanto Filmoj. She was brought on as an intern first, then hired as his personal assistant two months later.

== Career ==
Rodríguez earned more responsibilities and more prominent roles in Cuarón's company, moving from personal assistant to director's assistant during the production of Children of Men, for which she moved to London. She described her work on the film as a significant learning experience about production and operations of a film set. She then worked as associate producer on Gravity and the short film Aningaaq in 2013, before rising to run the production company. In that capacity she produced Roma in 2018, which won wide acclaim.

In an Associated Press interview, she described her role as producer as similar to "general manager [...] little glamour and a lot of work." She described several significant challenges during production. It was her first time working outside of a studio, and all of the assistance that a studio provides, putting additional responsibilities on her and co-producer Nicolas Celis. Though she has had a long working relationship with Cuarón, she has called him demanding and said that "he always gets his way, somehow" when it comes to filmmaking. In an interview at Northwestern University, she talked about having to find sixteen versions of dog feces and spending two weeks cutting up 400 tons of glue sticks to create hail. Cuarón did not share a script, wanted to film on location in real Mexican neighborhoods, and employed people without traditional acting experience, creating unusual complications for production as she worked to recreate the way his home looked in the 1970s. She said that while she thought Roma was a "spectacular" movie, which resonated with her own experiences growing up in Venezuela, she was surprised that it found widespread success outside of Latin America.

When Cuarón entered into a deal with Apple TV in 2019, Rodríguez took over daily operations at Esperanto Filmoj.

== Accolades ==
Roma earned many awards and accolades, including several for Rodríguez. She was nominated, with Alfonso Cuarón, for Best Picture at the 91st Academy Awards, becoming the first Latin American woman to be nominated in that category. She and Cuarón also won two BAFTAs for Best Film and Best Film Not in the English Language and a British Independent Film Award for Best Foreign Independent Film (with Cuarón and co-producer Nicolas Celis). She also received a nomination for the Producers Guild of America Award for Best Theatrical Motion Picture.

== Filmography ==
- The Possibility of Hope (short, 2007) – associate producer
- Gravity (2013) – associate producer
- Aningaaq (short, 2013) – producer
- Roma (2018) – producer
- Raymond and Ray (2022) - executive producer
- The Shepherd (short, 2023) - producer
- An Almost Christmas Story (short, 2024) - producer
- Disclaimer (in production) - executive producer
