= Yalitza Aparicio =

Mexican actress (born 1993)

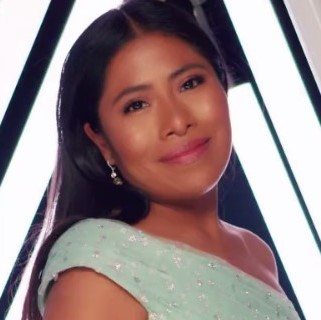
- Aparicio at the 2019 Academy Awards
- Born: Yalitza Aparicio Martínez; 11 December 1993 (age 32); Tlaxiaco, Oaxaca, Mexico
- Occupation: Actress
- Years active: 2018–present
- Notable work: Roma

Yalitza Aparicio Martínez (Spanish: [ɟʝaˈlitsa apaˈɾisjo]; born 11 December 1993) is a Mexican actress. She made her film debut as Cleo in Alfonso Cuarón's 2018 drama Roma, which earned her a nomination for the Academy Award for Best Actress; Aparicio was the first Indigenous Mexican woman to be nominated for that award. In 2019, Time magazine named her one of the 100 most influential people in the world. She was also named the UNESCO Goodwill Ambassador for Indigenous Peoples in the same year.

== Early life ==
Yalitza Aparicio Martínez was born 11 December 1993 in Tlaxiaco, Oaxaca. Her parents are of indigenous origin; her father is Mixtec and her mother is Triqui. She was not, however, fluent in the Mixtec language and had to learn it for her role in Roma. Aparicio was raised by a single mother who worked as a maid. She does not have formal training in acting, but rather has pursued a degree in pre-school education while already holding a degree in early childhood education and worked in a school. She won her first acting role just prior to qualifying as a teacher.

== Career ==
Aparicio made her acting debut in the drama film Roma, which was written and directed by Alfonso Cuarón. The film was released in November 2018. Aparicio received critical acclaim, with Peter Bradshaw of The Guardian stating that she "brings to the role something gentle, delicate, stoic and selfless. She is the jewel of this outstanding film."

For her performance, she was nominated for the Academy Award for Best Actress, becoming the first Indigenous American woman to receive a Best Actress Oscar nomination.

She also earned nominations in the same category from the Chicago Film Critics Association, the Critics' Choice Movie Awards, the Hollywood Film Awards, the Gotham Awards, the San Francisco Film Critics Circle, the Satellite Awards, and the Women Film Critics Circle, as well as recognition from Time and The New York Times.

Aparicio appeared on the cover of Vogue México in January 2019. She also appeared in the Vanity Fair 2019 "Hollywood Issue" cover. Aparicio was given the keys to Panama City, Panama, on 8 April 2019. Also in 2019, Aparicio was featured in the music video for the song "Plata ta tá" by Mon Laferte and Guaynaa.

In 2020, Aparicio was invited to become a member of the Academy of Motion Picture Arts and Sciences.

In 2021, Aparicio featured in the song "América Vibra" alongside Natiruts and Ziggy Marley.

In 2022, Aparicio appeared in the Mexican horror film Presencias. That same year, she had a recurring role as the Moon in four episodes of the second series of the American comedy series Los Espookys and starred in the third episode of the Mexican anthology series Mujeres asesinas.

In 2023, she co-starred with Memo Villegas and Pierre Louis in the comedy film The Great Seduction released on Netflix.

== Filmography ==
=== Film ===
Year	Title	Role	Notes	Ref.
2018	Roma	Cleo		
2021	Hijas de Brujas	Clara	Short film	
2022	Presencias	Paulina		
2023	The Great Seduction	Ana		
2026	The Long Haul	Araceli		

=== Television ===
Year	Title	Role	Notes	Ref.
2022	Mujeres asesinas	Rocío "La Insomne		
2022	Los Espookys	The Moon		
2024	Midnight Family ( Familia de medianoche)	Nayeli		
2025	Cometierra	Emma		

== Recognition ==
She was recognized as one of the BBC's 100 women of 2019.

== Awards and nominations ==
Year	Awards	Category	Project	Result
2018	Chicago Film Critics Association	Best Actress	Roma	Nominated
2018	Chicago Film Critics Association	Most Promising Performer	Roma	Nominated
2018	Gotham Awards	Breakthrough Actor	Roma	Nominated
2018	Hollywood Film Awards	New Hollywood Award	Roma	Won
2019	Academy Awards	Best Actress	Roma	Nominated
2019	Alliance of Women Film Journalists	Best Breakthrough Performance	Roma	Nominated
2019	Ariel Awards	Best Actress	Roma	Nominated
2019	Austin Film Critics Association	Breakthrough Artist Award	Roma	Nominated
2019	Critics' Choice Awards	Best Actress	Roma	Nominated
2019	Georgia Film Critics Association	Best Actress	Roma	Nominated
2019	Georgia Film Critics Association	Breakthrough Award	Roma	Nominated
2019	Platino Awards	Best Actress	Roma	Nominated
2019	San Francisco Film Critics Circle Award	Best Actress	Roma	Nominated
2019	Satellite Awards	Best Actress in a Motion Picture, Drama	Roma	Nominated
2019	MTV Millennial Awards	Top Women	Herself	Won
2019	National Hispanic Media Coalition Impact Awards	Outstanding Performance in a Film	Herself	Won
