= Maere Studios =

Animation studio

- Industry: Motion Picture, Visual Effects, Animation, TV
- Founded: 2016
- Founder: Nicholas Ashe Bateman
- Key people: Nicholas Ashe Bateman, David. A Ross, Cassandra Louise Baker, Z. Scott Schaefer
- Number of employees: 30+
- Website: https://www.maerestudios.com/

Maere Studios is a visual effects, design, and animation studio in New York City founded by Nicholas Ashe Bateman. The studio has done the visual effects for films such as The Wanting Mare (2020), The Green Knight (2021), Hocus Pocus 2 (2022), Peter Pan & Wendy (2023), Origin (2023), Knock at the Cabin (2023), Y2K (2024), An Almost Christmas Story (2024), and Caddo Lake (2024).

Maere Studios' first original animated feature film, The Turning Door, is set to be released in 2027.

== History ==
Maere Studios was founded in 2016 by Nicholas Ashe Bateman to make the microbudget feature film The Wanting Mare (2020).

The studio has created visual effects for many films including The Green Knight (2021), Hocus Pocus 2 (2022), Peter Pan & Wendy (2023), Origin (2023), Knock at the Cabin (2023), Y2K (2024), An Almost Christmas Story (2024), Free Solo (2018), Caddo Lake (2024), and the music video for Father John Misty’s song "Funny Girl".

In 2024, Maere Studios designed and did all visual effects for the short film An Almost Christmas Story, which premiered on Disney+.

In 2025, Maere Studios announced its first original animated feature film, a fantasy epic, The Turning Door, written and directed by Bateman and set to be released in 2027.

== Awards and nominations ==
- 2025: Special Jury Prize, "An Almost Christmas Story" – Annecy International Animation Film Festival.

== Selected film and television credits ==
The following is a selection of film, television, and music video projects that Maere Studios has contributed to.

=== Feature films, television, and music videos ===
- Free Solo (2018)
- Breaking Bread (2020)
- Wendy (2020)
- Save Yourselves! (2020)
- The Green Knight (2021)
- The Wanting Mare (2021)
- The Rescue (2022)
- Oak Thorn & The Old Rose of Love (2022)
- Hocus Pocus 2 (2022)
- Funny Girl (Father John Misty music video, 2022)
- Peter Pan & Wendy (2023)
- Origin (2023)
- Knock at the Cabin (2023)
- Y2K (2024)
- Caddo Lake (2024)
- An Almost Christmas Story (2024, Disney+)
- Magazine Dreams (2024)
- Rabbit Trap (2026)
- Mother Mary (2026)
- The Turning Door (2027, original animated feature)
