= List of accolades received by The Wind Rises =

The Wind Rises accolades
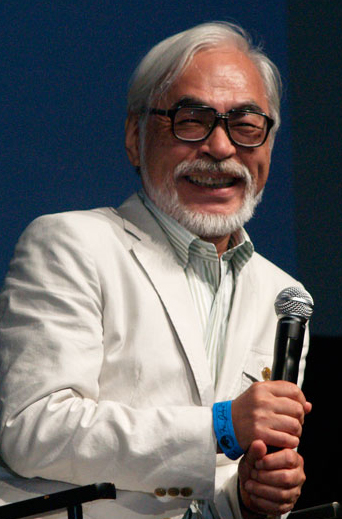
- Hayao Miyazaki received several awards and nominations for his direction and screenplay.
Accolades
Award	Wins	Nominations
Academy Awards	0	1
Alliance of Women Film Journalists	0	1
Annie Awards	1	3
Asia Pacific Screen Awards	0	1
Blue Ribbon Awards	0	2
Boston Society of Film Critics	1	1
Chicago Film Critics Association	1	2
Critics' Choice Movie Awards	0	1
Dallas–Fort Worth Film Critics Association	1	1
Florida Film Critics Circle	1	1
Georgia Film Critics Association	0	1
Golden Globe Awards	0	1
Golden Trailer Awards	1	3
Heartland Film Festival	1	1
Houston Film Critics Society	0	2
International Cinephile Society	1	1
International Film Music Critics Association	1	1
Japan Academy Film Prize	2	2
Kinema Junpo Awards	1	1
Los Angeles Film Critics Association	1	1
Mainichi Film Awards	1	1
Mill Valley Film Festival	1	1
National Board of Review	1	1
National Cartoonists Society Division Awards	1	1
New York Film Critics Circle	1	1
New York Film Critics Online	1	1
Online Film Critics Society	1	5
San Diego Film Critics Society	1	1
San Francisco Film Critics Circle	0	1
Satellite Awards	1	1
Saturn Awards	0	1
St. Louis Gateway Film Critics Association	1	1
Tokyo Anime Awards	5	5
Toronto Film Critics Association	1	1
Venice Film Festival	0	1
Village Voice Film Poll	1	1
Washington D.C. Area Film Critics Association	0	1
Women Film Critics Circle	1	1

Totals (Note: Certain award groups do not simply award one winner. They acknowledge several different recipients, have runners-up, and have third place. Since this is a specific recognition and is different from losing an award, runner-up mentions are considered wins in this award tally. For simplification and to avoid errors, each award in this list has been presumed to have had a prior nomination.)
- Wins: 31
- Nominations: 54

The Wind Rises (Japanese: 風立ちぬ, Hepburn: Kaze Tachinu; lit. 'The Wind Has Risen') is a 2013 Japanese animated historical drama film written and directed by Hayao Miyazaki, animated by Studio Ghibli, and distributed by Toho. It features the voices of Hideaki Anno, Miori Takimoto, Hidetoshi Nishijima, Masahiko Nishimura, Stephen Alpert, Morio Kazama, Keiko Takeshita, Mirai Shida, Jun Kunimura, Shinobu Otake, and Mansai Nomura. The film is a fictionalized biography of Jiro Horikoshi, a Japanese engineer who designed various warplanes during World War II, including the Mitsubishi A6M Zero. It was adapted from Miyazaki's manga of the same name.

The film was released in Japan on 20 July 2013 and had its international premiere in competition at the 70th Venice International Film Festival on 1 September. It grossed US$136.8 million worldwide and was the highest-grossing film of 2013 in Japan. On the review aggregator website Rotten Tomatoes, the film holds an approval rating of 88% based on 182 reviews.

The Wind Rises garnered numerous awards and nominations, particularly for its screenplay, animation, and musical score. At the 37th Japan Academy Film Prize, the film won Animation of the Year, while Joe Hisaishi's score won Outstanding Achievement in Music. It earned three nominations at the 41st Annie Awards, with Miyazaki winning an award for Outstanding Achievement for Writing in a Feature Production. At the 86th Academy Awards, the film was nominated for Best Animated Feature. It won five awards at the Tokyo Anime Awards, including the Grand Prize in the Feature Film category. Several film critic organizations, including the National Board of Review, also recognized The Wind Rises as the best animated film of 2013.

== Accolades ==
Accolades received by The Wind Rises
Award	Date of ceremony	Category	Recipient(s)	Result	Ref.
Academy Awards	2 March 2014	Best Animated Feature	Hayao Miyazaki and Toshio Suzuki	Nominated	
Alliance of Women Film Journalists	19 December 2013	Best Animated Feature	Hayao Miyazaki	Nominated	
Annie Awards	1 February 2014	Best Animated Feature	The Wind Rises	Nominated	
Annie Awards	1 February 2014	Outstanding Achievement for Character Animation in a Feature Production	Kitarō Kōsaka	Nominated	
Annie Awards	1 February 2014	Outstanding Achievement for Writing in a Feature Production	Hayao Miyazaki	Won	
Asia Pacific Screen Awards	12 December 2013	Best Animated Feature Film	Toshio Suzuki	Nominated	
Blue Ribbon Awards	11 February 2014	Best Film	The Wind Rises	Nominated	
Blue Ribbon Awards	11 February 2014	Best Director	Hayao Miyazaki	Nominated	
Boston Society of Film Critics	8 December 2013	Best Animated Film	The Wind Rises	Won	
Chicago Film Critics Association	16 December 2013	Best Animated Film	The Wind Rises	Won	
Chicago Film Critics Association	16 December 2013	Best Foreign Language Film	The Wind Rises	Nominated	
Critics' Choice Movie Awards	16 January 2014	Best Animated Feature	The Wind Rises	Nominated	
Dallas–Fort Worth Film Critics Association	16 December 2013	Best Foreign Language Film	The Wind Rises	4th place	
Florida Film Critics Circle	18 December 2013	Best Animated Film	The Wind Rises	Runner-up	
Georgia Film Critics Association	10 January 2014	Best Animated Film	The Wind Rises	Nominated	
Golden Globe Awards	12 January 2014	Best Foreign Language Film	The Wind Rises	Nominated	
Golden Trailer Awards	30 May 2014	Best Foreign Animation Trailer	"UK Trailer" (The Editpool)	Nominated	
Golden Trailer Awards	30 May 2014	Best Foreign TV Spot	"Spirit ND 30" (Trailer Park, Inc.)	Nominated	
Golden Trailer Awards	30 May 2014	Best Foreign TV Spot	"Visionary 30" (Trailer Park, Inc.)	Won	
Heartland Film Festival	18 October 2014	Truly Moving Picture Award	The Wind Rises	Won	
Houston Film Critics Society	15 December 2013	Best Animated Feature Film	The Wind Rises	Nominated	
Houston Film Critics Society	15 December 2013	Best Foreign Language Film	The Wind Rises	Nominated	
International Cinephile Society	23 February 2014	Best Animated Film	The Wind Rises	Runner-up	
International Film Music Critics Association	20 February 2014	Best Original Score for an Animated Film	Joe Hisaishi	Won	
Japan Academy Film Prize	7 March 2014	Animation of the Year	The Wind Rises	Won	
Japan Academy Film Prize	7 March 2014	Outstanding Achievement in Music	Joe Hisaishi	Won	
Kinema Junpo Awards	8 February 2014	Best Film of the Year	The Wind Rises	7th place	
Los Angeles Film Critics Association	8 December 2013	Best Animation	The Wind Rises	Runner-up	
Mainichi Film Awards	13 February 2014	Tsutaya Movie Fan Award – Japanese Film	The Wind Rises	Won	
Mill Valley Film Festival	13 October 2013	Audience Favorite – Animation	The Wind Rises	Won	
National Board of Review	7 January 2014	Best Animated Feature	The Wind Rises	Won	
National Cartoonists Society Division Awards	24 May 2014	Feature Animation	Hayao Miyazaki	Won	
New York Film Critics Circle	6 January 2014	Best Animated Film	The Wind Rises	Won	
New York Film Critics Online	8 December 2013	Best Animated Feature	The Wind Rises	Won	
Online Film Critics Society	16 December 2013	Best Picture	The Wind Rises	Nominated	
Online Film Critics Society	16 December 2013	Best Director	Hayao Miyazaki	Nominated	
Online Film Critics Society	16 December 2013	Best Animated Feature	The Wind Rises	Won	
Online Film Critics Society	16 December 2013	Best Adapted Screenplay	Hayao Miyazaki	Nominated	
Online Film Critics Society	16 December 2013	Best Film Not in the English Language	The Wind Rises	Nominated	
San Diego Film Critics Society	11 December 2013	Best Animated Film	The Wind Rises	Won	
San Francisco Film Critics Circle	15 December 2013	Best Animated Feature	The Wind Rises	Nominated	
Satellite Awards	23 February 2014	Best Animated or Mixed Media Feature	The Wind Rises	Won	
Saturn Awards	25 June 2015	Best Animated Film	The Wind Rises	Nominated	
St. Louis Gateway Film Critics Association	16 December 2013	Best Animated Film	The Wind Rises	Runner-up	
Tokyo Anime Awards	22 March 2014	Grand Prize – Feature Film	The Wind Rises	Won	
Tokyo Anime Awards	22 March 2014	Best Screenplay/Original Work	Hayao Miyazaki	Won	
Tokyo Anime Awards	22 March 2014	Best Animator	Kitarō Kōsaka	Won	
Tokyo Anime Awards	22 March 2014	Best Art Direction	Yōji Takeshige	Won	
Tokyo Anime Awards	22 March 2014	Best Voice Actor	Hideaki Anno	Won	
Toronto Film Critics Association	17 December 2013	Best Animated Feature	The Wind Rises	Won	
Venice Film Festival	7 September 2013	Golden Lion	The Wind Rises	Nominated	
Village Voice Film Poll	17 December 2013	Best Animated Feature	The Wind Rises	Won	
Washington D.C. Area Film Critics Association	9 December 2013	Best Animated Feature	The Wind Rises	Nominated	
Women Film Critics Circle	16 December 2013	Best Family Film	The Wind Rises	Won	
