= List of accolades received by Inside Llewyn Davis =

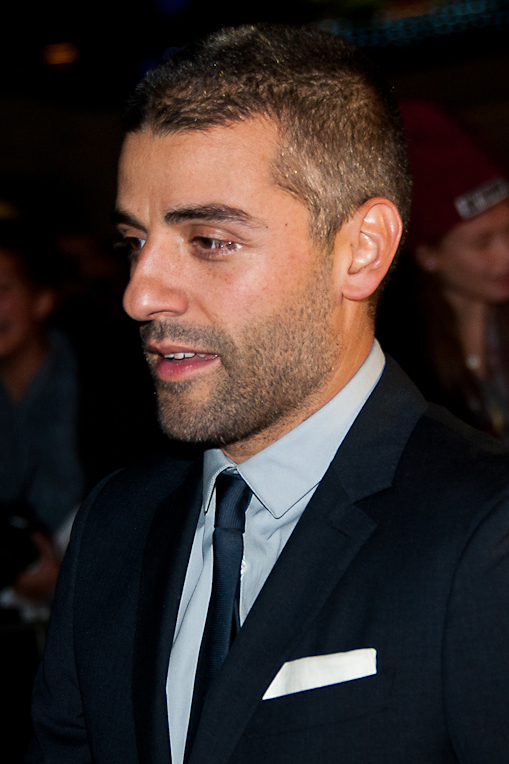
- Oscar Isaac at the premiere of Inside Llewyn Davis. Isaac was praised by critics for his performance.
Accolades
Award	Won	Nominated
AACTA Awards	0	1
Academy Awards	0	2
Alliance of Women Film Journalists	1	5
American Cinema Editors	0	1
American Film Institute	1	1
American Society of Cinematographers	0	1
Art Directors Guild	0	1
Boston Society of Film Critics	1	1
British Academy Film Awards	0	3
Camerimage	1	1
Cannes Film Festival	1	1
Chicago Film Critics Association	0	6
Cinema Audio Society	0	1
Critics' Choice Movie Awards	0	4
Dallas–Fort Worth Film Critics Association	1	1
Empire Awards	0	1
Florida Film Critics Circle	1	1
Golden Globe Awards	0	3
Gotham Awards	1	2
Independent Spirit Awards	0	3
London Film Critics Circle Awards	1	3
Los Angeles Film Critics Association	2	2
Motion Picture Sound Editors	0	2
National Board of Review	2	2
National Society of Film Critics	4	4
New York Film Critics Circle	1	1
New York Film Critics Online	1	1
Online Film Critics Society	0	6
San Diego Film Critics Society	1	5
San Francisco Film Critics Circle	0	3
Santa Barbara International Film Festival	1	1
Satellite Awards	1	6
Saturn Awards	0	3
St. Louis Gateway Film Critics Association	1	3
Toronto Film Critics Association	4	4
Washington D.C. Area Film Critics Association	0	4
- Total number of awards and nominations (Note: Certain award groups do not simply award one winner. They recognize several different recipients and have runners-up. Since this is a specific recognition and is different from losing an award, runner-up mentions are considered wins in this award tally.)
Totals	27	90
- References

Inside Llewyn Davis is a 2013 American comedy-drama film written, directed and edited by Joel and Ethan Coen. The film stars Oscar Isaac, Carey Mulligan, and John Goodman, and was produced by Scott Rudin, and Ethan and Joel Coen. T Bone Burnett was the executive music producer. The story is about a week in the life of a singer-songwriter who is active in New York's folk music scene in 1961. Although Llewyn Davis is a fictional character, the story was partly inspired by the autobiography of folk singer Dave Van Ronk. The folk songs performed in the film are all sung in full, and, with one exception, were recorded live.

The film premiered at the 2013 Cannes Film Festival on May 19, where it won the Grand Prix. The film then began a limited release at four theatres on December 6, 2013, before later going on wide release at over 700 theatres on January 10, 2014 in the United States and Canada, by CBS Films. The film has grossed a worldwide total of over $32 million on a budget of $17 million. Upon release, review aggregator Rotten Tomatoes surveyed 233 reviews and judged 95 percent to be positive.

At the 86th Academy Awards, Inside Llewyn Davis was nominated for Best Cinematography and Best Sound Mixing, but lost both to Gravity. At the 67th British Academy Film Awards, it was nominated in three categories: Best Original Screenplay, Best Cinematography and Best Sound, but it failed to win any. At the 70th Golden Globe Awards, it was nominated for Best Motion Picture – Musical or Comedy, Best Performance by an Actor in a Motion Picture – Musical or Comedy, and Best Original Song and again won nothing.

At the 18th Satellite Awards, it had six nominations, winning for Best Cinematography. Inside Llewyn Davis was also nominated for three Independent Spirit Awards: Best Feature, Best Male Lead and Best Cinematography. Both the National Board of Review and the American Film Institute included the film in their list of top ten films of 2013.

== Accolades ==
Award	Date of ceremony	Category	Recipient(s) and nominee(s)	Result	Ref.
AACTA International Awards	January 10, 2014	Best Screenplay	Joel and Ethan Coen	Nominated	
Academy Awards	March 2, 2014	Best Cinematography	Bruno Delbonnel	Nominated	
Academy Awards	March 2, 2014	Best Sound Mixing	Skip Lievsay, Greg Orloff and Peter F. Kurland	Nominated	
Alliance of Women Film Journalists	December 19, 2013	Best Film	Inside Llewyn Davis	Nominated	
Alliance of Women Film Journalists	December 19, 2013	Best Director (Female or Male)	Joel and Ethan Coen	Nominated	
Alliance of Women Film Journalists	December 19, 2013	Best Actor	Oscar Isaac	Nominated	
Alliance of Women Film Journalists	December 19, 2013	Best Screenplay, Original	Joel and Ethan Coen	Nominated	
Alliance of Women Film Journalists	December 19, 2013	Best Music or Score	T Bone Burnett	Won	
American Cinema Editors	February 7, 2014	Best Edited Feature Film – Comedy/Musical	Roderick Jaynes (alias for the Coen brothers)	Nominated	
American Film Institute	January 10, 2014	Top Ten Films of the Year	Scott Rudin, Joel Coen and Ethan Coen	Won	
American Society of Cinematographers Awards	February 1, 2014	Outstanding Achievement in Cinematography in Theatrical Releases	Bruno Delbonnel	Nominated	
Art Directors Guild	February 8, 2014	Excellence in Production Design – Period Film	Jess Gonchor	Nominated	
Boston Society of Film Critics	December 8, 2013	Best Use of Music in a Film	Inside Llewyn Davis	Won	
British Academy Film Awards	February 16, 2014	Best Original Screenplay	Joel and Ethan Coen	Nominated	
British Academy Film Awards	February 16, 2014	Best Cinematography	Bruno Delbonnel	Nominated	
British Academy Film Awards	February 16, 2014	Best Sound	Peter F. Kurland, Skip Lievsay and Greg Orloff	Nominated	
British Broadcasting Corporation	August, 2016	BBC's 100 Greatest Films of the 21st Century	Position 11 of 100	Won	
Camerimage	November 23, 2013	Bronze Frog for Best Cinematography	Bruno Delbonnel	Won	
Cannes Film Festival	May 26, 2013	Grand Prix	Joel and Ethan Coen	Won	
Casting Society of America	January 22, 2015	Studio or Independent Drama	Ellen Chenoweth and Amelia McCarthy	Nominated	
Chicago Film Critics Association	December 16, 2013	Best Picture	Inside Llewyn Davis	Nominated	
Chicago Film Critics Association	December 16, 2013	Best Director	Joel and Ethan Coen	Nominated	
Chicago Film Critics Association	December 16, 2013	Best Actor	Oscar Isaac	Nominated	
Chicago Film Critics Association	December 16, 2013	Best Original Screenplay	Joel and Ethan Coen	Nominated	
Chicago Film Critics Association	December 16, 2013	Best Cinematography	Bruno Delbonnel	Nominated	
Chicago Film Critics Association	December 16, 2013	Best Art Direction/ Production Design	Inside Llewyn Davis	Nominated	
Cinema Audio Society	February 22, 2014	Outstanding Achievement in Sound Mixing – Motion Picture – Live Action	Peter F. Kurkland, Skip Lievsay, Greg Orloff, Bobby Johanson and George A. Lara	Nominated	
Critics' Choice Movie Awards	January 16, 2014	Best Picture	Inside Llewyn Davis	Nominated	
Critics' Choice Movie Awards	January 16, 2014	Best Original Screenplay	Joel and Ethan Coen	Nominated	
Critics' Choice Movie Awards	January 16, 2014	Best Cinematography	Bruno Delbonnel	Nominated	
Critics' Choice Movie Awards	January 16, 2014	Best Song	"Please Mr. Kennedy" – Justin Timberlake, Oscar Isaac and Adam Driver	Nominated	
Dallas–Fort Worth Film Critics Association	December 16, 2013	Top 10 Films of the Year	Inside Llewyn Davis	8th Place	
Empire Awards	March 30, 2014	Best Male Newcomer	Oscar Isaac	Nominated	
Florida Film Critics Circle	December 18, 2013	Best Cinematography	Bruno Delbonnel	2nd Place	
Golden Globe Awards	January 12, 2014	Best Motion Picture – Musical or Comedy	Inside Llewyn Davis	Nominated	
Golden Globe Awards	January 12, 2014	Best Actor – Motion Picture Musical or Comedy	Oscar Isaac	Nominated	
Golden Globe Awards	January 12, 2014	Best Original Song	"Please Mr. Kennedy" – Ed Rush, George Cromarty, T Bone Burnett, Justin Timberlake, Joel Coen and Ethan Coen	Nominated	
Gotham Awards	December 2, 2013	Best Feature	Inside Llewyn Davis	Won	
Gotham Awards	December 2, 2013	Best Actor	Oscar Isaac	Nominated	
Independent Spirit Awards	March 1, 2014	Best Feature	Inside Llewyn Davis	Nominated	
Independent Spirit Awards	March 1, 2014	Best Male Lead	Oscar Isaac	Nominated	
Independent Spirit Awards	March 1, 2014	Best Cinematography	Bruno Delbonnel	Nominated	
London Film Critics Circle Awards	February 2, 2014	Film of the Year	Inside Llewyn Davis	Nominated	
London Film Critics Circle Awards	February 2, 2014	Screenwriter of the Year	Joel and Ethan Coen	Won	
London Film Critics Circle Awards	February 2, 2014	Technical Achievement Award	T Bone Burnett (music)	Nominated	
Los Angeles Film Critics Association	December 8, 2013	Best Production Design	Jess Gonchor	Runner-up	
Los Angeles Film Critics Association	December 8, 2013	Best Music Score	T Bone Burnett	Won	
Motion Picture Sound Editors Golden Reel Awards	February 16, 2014	Best Sound Editing: Music in a Musical Feature Film	Jen Monnar	Nominated	
Motion Picture Sound Editors Golden Reel Awards	February 16, 2014	Best Sound Editing: Dialogue & ADR in a Feature Film	Skip Lievsay	Nominated	
National Board of Review	December 4, 2013	Top Ten Films	Inside Llewyn Davis	Won	
National Board of Review	December 4, 2013	Best Original Screenplay	Joel and Ethan Coen	Won	
National Society of Film Critics	January 4, 2014	Best Picture	Inside Llewyn Davis	Won	
National Society of Film Critics	January 4, 2014	Best Director	Joel and Ethan Coen	Won	
National Society of Film Critics	January 4, 2014	Best Actor	Oscar Isaac	Won	
National Society of Film Critics	January 4, 2014	Best Cinematography	Bruno Delbonnel	Won	
New York Film Critics Circle	December 3, 2013	Best Cinematography	Bruno Delbonnel	Won	
New York Film Critics Online	December 8, 2013	Best Use of Music	Inside Llewyn Davis	Won	
Online Film Critics Society	December 16, 2013	Best Picture	Inside Llewyn Davis	Nominated	
Online Film Critics Society	December 16, 2013	Best Director	Joel and Ethan Coen	Nominated	
Online Film Critics Society	December 16, 2013	Best Actor	Oscar Isaac	Nominated	
Online Film Critics Society	December 16, 2013	Best Original Screenplay	Joel and Ethan Coen	Nominated	
Online Film Critics Society	December 16, 2013	Best Editing	Skip Lievsay, Paul Urmson and Igor Nikolic	Nominated	
Online Film Critics Society	December 16, 2013	Best Cinematography	Bruno Delbonnel	Nominated	
San Diego Film Critics Society	December 11, 2013	Best Film	Inside Llewyn Davis	Nominated	
San Diego Film Critics Society	December 11, 2013	Best Director	Joel and Ethan Coen	Nominated	
San Diego Film Critics Society	December 11, 2013	Best Actor	Oscar Isaac	Won	
San Diego Film Critics Society	December 11, 2013	Best Original Screenplay	Joel and Ethan Coen	Nominated	
San Diego Film Critics Society	December 11, 2013	Best Cinematography	Bruno Delbonnel	Nominated	
San Francisco Film Critics Circle	December 15, 2013	Best Original Screenplay	Joel and Ethan Coen	Nominated	
San Francisco Film Critics Circle	December 15, 2013	Best Cinematography	Bruno Delbonnel	Nominated	
San Francisco Film Critics Circle	December 15, 2013	Best Production Design	Jess Gonchor	Nominated	
Santa Barbara International Film Festival	December 8, 2013	Virtuoso Award	Oscar Isaac (with Daniel Brühl, Adèle Exarchopoulos, Michael B. Jordan, Brie Larson, Jared Leto and June Squibb)	Won	
Satellite Awards	February 23, 2014	Best Motion Picture	Inside Llewyn Davis	Nominated	
Satellite Awards	February 23, 2014	Best Director	Joel and Ethan Coen	Nominated	
Satellite Awards	February 23, 2014	Best Original Screenplay	Joel and Ethan Coen	Nominated	
Satellite Awards	February 23, 2014	Best Original Song	"Please Mr. Kennedy"	Nominated	
Satellite Awards	February 23, 2014	Best Cinematography	Bruno Delbonnel	Won	
Satellite Awards	February 23, 2014	Best Sound (Editing and Mixing)	Skip Lievsay, Paul Urmson and Igor Nikolic	Nominated	
Saturn Awards	June 26, 2014	Best Independent Film	Inside Llewyn Davis	Nominated	
Saturn Awards	June 26, 2014	Best Writing	Joel Coen and Ethan Coen	Nominated	
Saturn Awards	June 26, 2014	Best Actor	Oscar Isaac	Nominated	
St. Louis Gateway Film Critics Association	December 14, 2013	Best Cinematography	Bruno Delbonnel	Nominated	
St. Louis Gateway Film Critics Association	December 14, 2013	Best Soundtrack	Inside Llewyn Davis	Won	
St. Louis Gateway Film Critics Association	December 14, 2013	Best Art Direction	Jess Gonchor and Susan Bode Tyson	Nominated	
Toronto Film Critics Association	December 17, 2013	Best Picture	Inside Llewyn Davis	Won	
Toronto Film Critics Association	December 17, 2013	Best Actor	Oscar Isaac	Won	
Toronto Film Critics Association	December 17, 2013	Best Director	Joel and Ethan Coen	Runner-up	
Toronto Film Critics Association	December 17, 2013	Best Screenplay, Adapted or Original	Joel and Ethan Coen	Runner-up	
Washington D.C. Area Film Critics Association	December 9, 2013	Best Film	Inside Llewyn Davis	Nominated	
Washington D.C. Area Film Critics Association	December 9, 2013	Best Original Screenplay	Joel and Ethan Coen	Nominated	
Washington D.C. Area Film Critics Association	December 9, 2013	Best Art Direction	Production Designer: Jess Gonchor, Set Decorator: Susan Bode Tyson	Nominated	
Washington D.C. Area Film Critics Association	December 9, 2013	Best Cinematography	Bruno Delbonnel	Nominated	

^{^[I]} Each date is linked to the article about the awards held that year whenever possible.

== See also ==
- 2013 in film
