= 20 Feet from Stardom (soundtrack) =

20 Feet from Stardom (Music from the Motion Picture)

Soundtrack album by various artists
- Released: June 18, 2013
- Recorded: 1960–1990
- Length: 49:02
- Label: Columbia

20 Feet from Stardom (Music from the Motion Picture) is the soundtrack to the 2013 documentary film 20 Feet from Stardom directed by Morgan Neville. Released through Columbia Records on June 18, 2013, the album featured songs heard in the documentary.

== Background ==
Neville met Jonathan Palmer, Columbia Records senior director of creative licensing, at the 2013 Sundance Film Festival and negotiated about the film's soundtrack rights. During the Q&A sessions at the festival, Neville was interviewed about a possibility of the film's soundtrack, which he agreed to and attributed that the album reflected the film's storytelling rather than a jukebox collection of popular music and added that "the attractive element was this wealth of new material".

The album consisted of new recordings that are edited during the film's production, which included Bill Withers' "Lean on Me" covered by Darlene Love, with Lisa Fischer, Judith Hill and Jo Lawry, The cover of "Nobody's Fault But Mine" performed by Merry Clayton with Hill, Oren Waters, Tata Vega and Charlotte Crossley. Vega and Hill's cover of "Let's Make a Better World" with Clayton, Waters and Crossley performing background vocals. Hill also performed the original song "Desperation".

== Reception ==
Steve Leggett of AllMusic wrote "This soundtrack album from Morgan Neville's documentary 20 Feet from Stardom is a soundtrack, certainly, but it's also something a little more than that."

== Track listing ==
20 Feet from Stardom (Music from the Motion Picture) track listing
No.	Title	Artist(s)	Length
1.	"Walk On The Wild Side"	Lou Reed	4:15
2.	"Slippery People"	Talking Heads	4:02
3.	"Nobody's Fault But Mine"	Merry Clayton feat. Oren Waters, Judith Hill, Táta Vega and Charlotte Crossley	3:07
4.	"He's a Rebel"	The Crystals	2:31
5.	"Space Captain"	Joe Cocker	4:49
6.	"Gimme Shelter"	Merry Clayton	3:32
7.	"Sure On This Shining Night"	Lisa Fischer	1:58
8.	"Let's Make a Better World"	Táta Vega and Judith Hill	3:01
9.	"Young Americans"	David Bowie	5:14
10.	"Southern Man"	Merry Clayton	3:14
11.	"Desperation"	Judith Hill	3:49
12.	"A Fine, Fine Boy"	Darlene Love	4:20
13.	"Lean on Me"	Darlene Love feat. Lisa Fischer, Jo Lawry and Judith Hill	5:10
Total length:			49:02

== Charts ==
Chart performance for 20 Feet from Stardom (Music from the Motion Picture)
Chart (2014)	Peak position
UK Soundtrack Albums (OCC)	37

== Accolades ==
Accolades for 20 Feet from Stardom (Music from the Motion Picture)
Award / Film Festival	Category	Recipient(s)	Result
2014 Black Reel Awards	Outstanding Original Song	"Desperation" – Judith Hill	Won
