= Jeremy Siskind =

American pianist, composer, and educator (born 1986)

- Born: October 14, 1986 (age 39); United States
- Genres: jazz, classical
- Occupations: Pianist, educator
- Years active: 2010–present
- Labels: Outside In Music, Brooklyn Jazz Underground
- Website: www.jeremysiskind.com

Jeremy Siskind (born October 14, 1986) is an American pianist, composer, and educator known for his innovative blending of jazz and classical music.

== Early life ==
Siskind was raised in Irvine, California and began playing piano at age four. Jeremy was trained in the Yamaha Music Education System, and quickly distinguished himself in their Junior Original Concert program, where he was twice selected to be the United States representative to Japan. Siskind studied jazz piano with Linda Martinez and Tamir Hendelman.

Siskind earned degrees in Jazz Performance and Music Theory at the Eastman School of Music in Rochester, New York, where he studied with Tony Caramia, Bill Dobbins, and Harold Danko. In 2006, Siskind was noticed by jazz legend Marian McPartland, who invited him to record an episode of Piano Jazz on NPR.

Siskind began participating in piano competitions while at Eastman, and was a three-time finalist for the Kathleen T. and Philip B. Phillips, M.D. Jazz Piano Competition. He was also a finalist for the American Piano Awards Cole Porter Fellowship in Jazz in 2007 and 2011, but ultimately lost to Dan Tepfer and Aaron Diehl, respectively. Siskind won second prize at the Montreux Solo Jazz Piano Competition in Switzerland in 2011, and won first prize in the Nottingham International Solo Piano Competition in 2013.

Upon graduating Eastman in 2008, Siskind moved to New York City to pursue a degree in English and Comparative Literature at Columbia University. While at Columbia, Siskind began studies with Fred Hersch and Sophia Rosoff.

While in New York, Siskind recorded his debut record, Simple Songs (for When the World Seems Strange), featuring bassist Chris Lightcap, drummer Ted Poor, and vocalist Jo Lawry.

== Career and style ==
A hallmark of Siskind's career is the combination of classical and jazz. In his debut recital at Carnegie Hall’s Weill Hall in 2012, he performed Debussy’s Etudes in the first half of the program and jazz compositions in the second half. His project with Andrew Rathbun, released as Impressions of Debussy in 2020, features the jazz duo improvising on Debussy's piano preludes.

Siskind's Perpetual Motion Etudes was also released in 2020, as both a self-published book and CD from the Outside In Music label, combining through-composed material with jazz improvisation. Siskind's scheduled premieres of these works, featuring two-piano duos with Grammy-winning pianist Angelin Chang, were cancelled as a repercussion of the COVID-19 pandemic. As a result, he instead took to Instagram Live, performing ballads from his home.

Siskind also combines classical and jazz influences with the Housewarming Project, his chamber jazz group featuring vocalist Nancy Harms and Lucas Pino playing saxophone, clarinet, and bass clarinet. The Housewarming Project recorded two albums and performed well over 100 house concerts in over 25 states. Their repertoire features Siskind's lyric writing, which draws information from poetry and prose he read while studying at Columbia.

Siskind was named a Yamaha Artist in 2014.

== Collaborative work ==
Siskind has been a frequent collaborator with soprano Julia Bullock, writing multiple sets of arrangements, including a cycle of the music of Josephine Baker.

Siskind collaborated with pianist Lori Sims and saxophonist Andrew Rathbun on "Impressions of Debussy." He has also served as music director for comedians Lea DeLaria and Sandra Bernhard.

== Teaching ==
Siskind is a well-regarded pedagogue and active educator. As a collegiate professor, he has taught at Eastman (while still a student in 2006), Western Michigan University (2012-2017), and Fullerton College in California (2017–present day). Siskind served as the founding Artistic Director of the American Jazz Pianist Competition from 2014 to 2016.

As an author and composer, Siskind has published extensively with Hal Leonard, including instructional books Jazz Band Pianist and First Lessons in Piano Improv. He is also a frequent presenter at piano conferences such as the Music Teachers National Association and the National Conference for Keyboard Pedagogy, where he serves as the Chair of the Creative Track. Siskind actively teaches creativity, improvisation, and jazz with Yamaha Music Education and Jazz Education Abroad, who organizes masterclasses in places like China, Thailand, Cyprus, and Lebanon.

Siskind is the teacher of prodigy Justin-Lee Schultz since 2016. The two began lessons when they were both living in Kalamazoo, Michigan.

Jeremy's brother is Dr. Scott Siskind, who blogs under the name Scott Alexander at Slate Star Codex.

== Discography ==
=== As a leader ===
- Simple Songs (for When the World Seems Strange) (Brooklyn Jazz Underground, 2010) with Chris Lightcap, Ted Poor, and Jo Lawry
- Finger-Songwriter (Brooklyn Jazz Underground, 2012) with Lucas Pino and Nancy Harms
- Housewarming (Brooklyn Jazz Underground, 2015) with Lucas Pino, Nancy Harms, plus Kurt Elling, Peter Eldridge, Kendra Shank
- Perpetual Motion Etudes (Outside in Music, 2020)

=== As a co-leader ===
- Free Fall (2014) with the Western Jazz Quartet
- Impressions of Debussy (Centaur Records, 2020) with Andrew Rathbun and Lori Sims

=== As a sideman ===
- Bridges (2015) with Doug Scarborough
- Ellington at Night (Gazzelle Records, 2016) with Nancy Harms
- Atwood Suites (2018) with Andrew Rathbun Large Ensemble

=== Other ===
- at_Home/at_Play (2018) video series with Lucas Pino and Nancy Harms

== Publications ==
- 2020: Playing Solo Jazz Piano (self-published)
- 2020: Perpetual Motion Etudes (self-published)
- 2020: Such Harmonious Madness (self-published)
- 2019: Theme from New York New York — for six hands (Hal Leonard)
- 2018: Big Apple Jazz (Hal Leonard)
- 2017: Pop Duets (Hal Leonard)
- 2015: First Lessons in Piano Improv (Hal Leonard)
- 2015: Jazz Hits (Hal Leonard)
- 2015: Myths and Monsters (Hal Leonard)
- 2014: Jazz Band Pianist (Hal Leonard)
- 2014: Double Agent (Hal Leonard)
- 2013: Conga Lion (Hal Leonard)
- 2013: The Magic of Standards (Hal Leonard)
- 2012: Jazz Etude Inspirations (Hal Leonard)
- 2012: Big Band Shout (Hal Leonard)
