= Chicago Film Critics Association Awards 2013 =

Annual US film awards ceremony

26th Chicago Film Critics Association Awards
- Date: December 16, 2013
- Site: Chicago, Illinois U.S.

Highlights
- Best Film: 12 Years a Slave
- Most awards: 12 Years a Slave (5)
- Most nominations: 12 Years a Slave (12)

The 26th Chicago Film Critics Association Awards were announced on December 16, 2013. The awards honor the best in film for 2013. The nominations were announced on December 13, 2013.

== Winners and nominees ==
The nominations for the 26th Chicago Film Critics Association Awards are as follows:

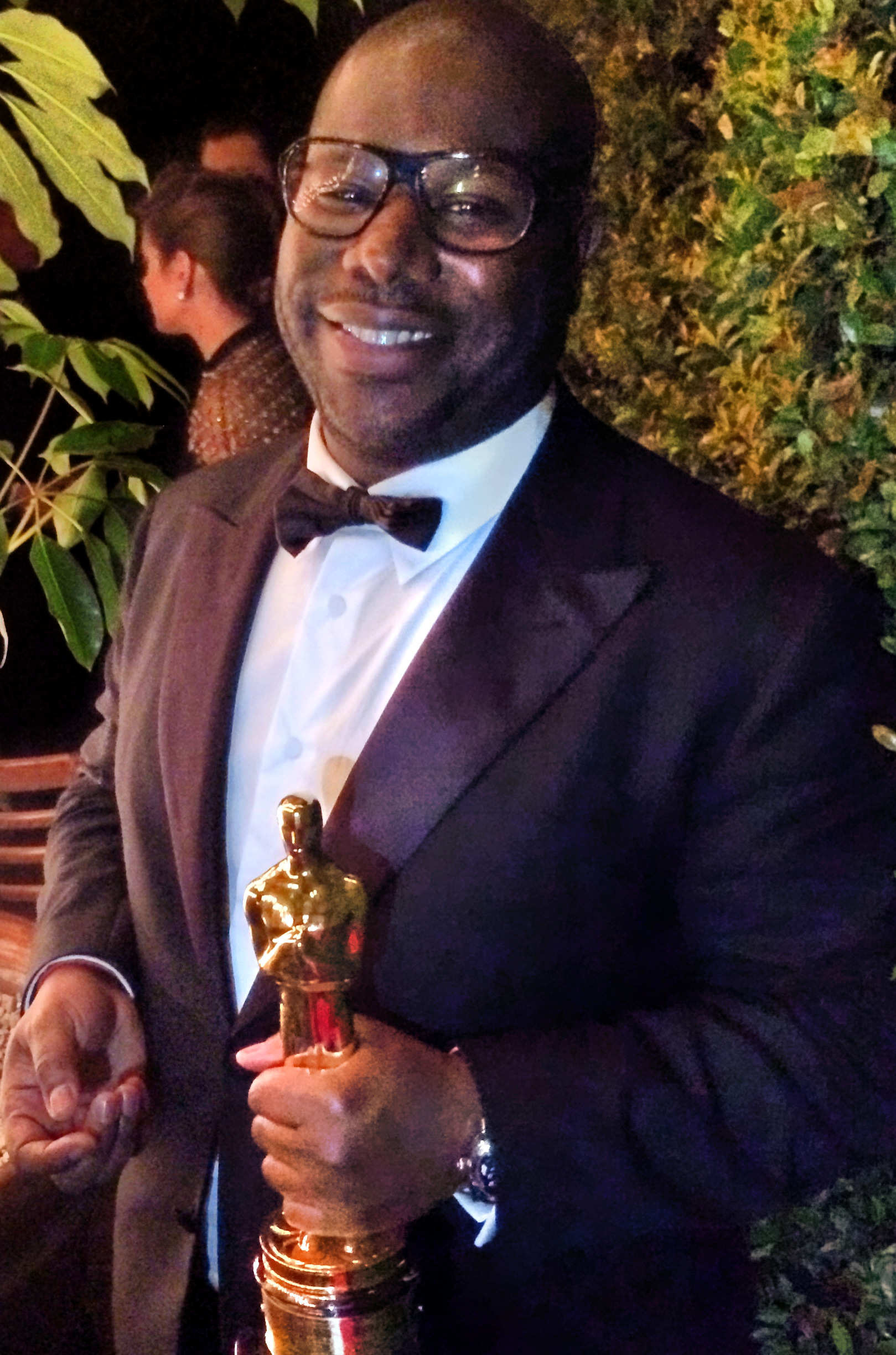
Steve McQueen, Best Director winner

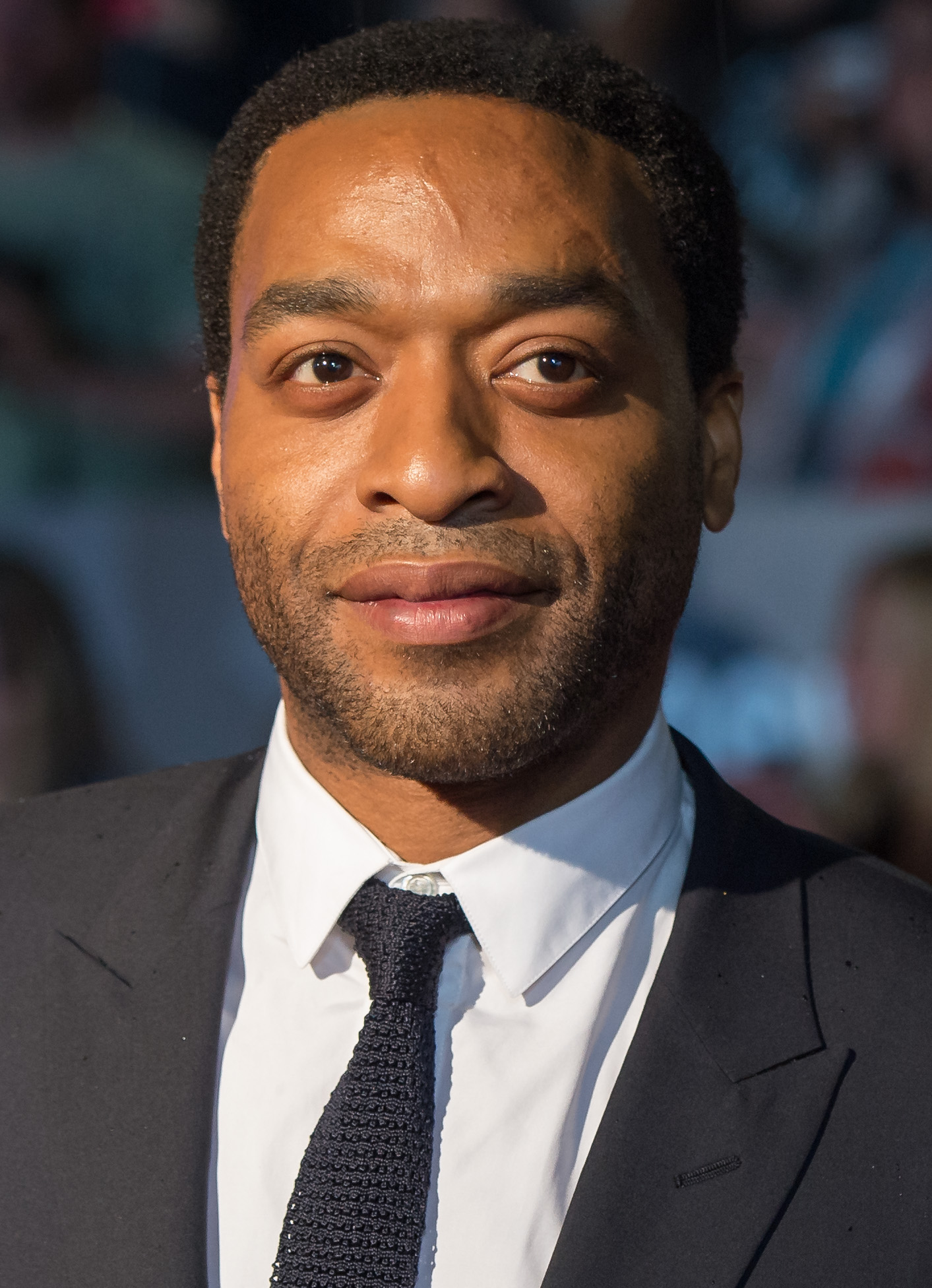
Chiwetel Ejiofor, Best Actor winner

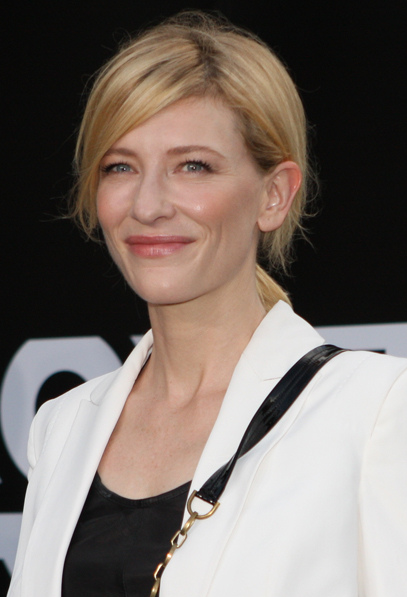
Cate Blanchett, Best Actress winner

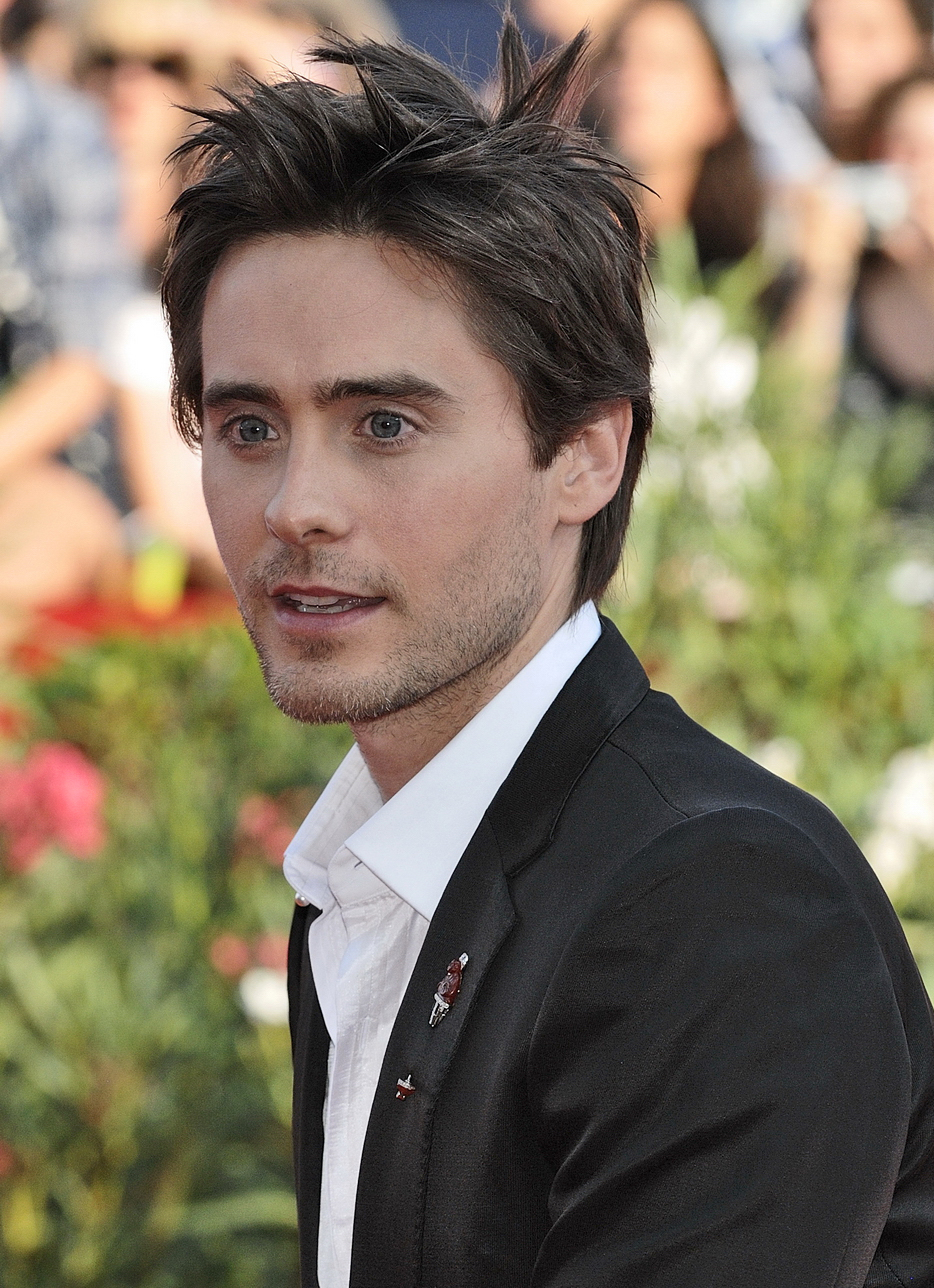
Jared Leto, Best Supporting Actor winner

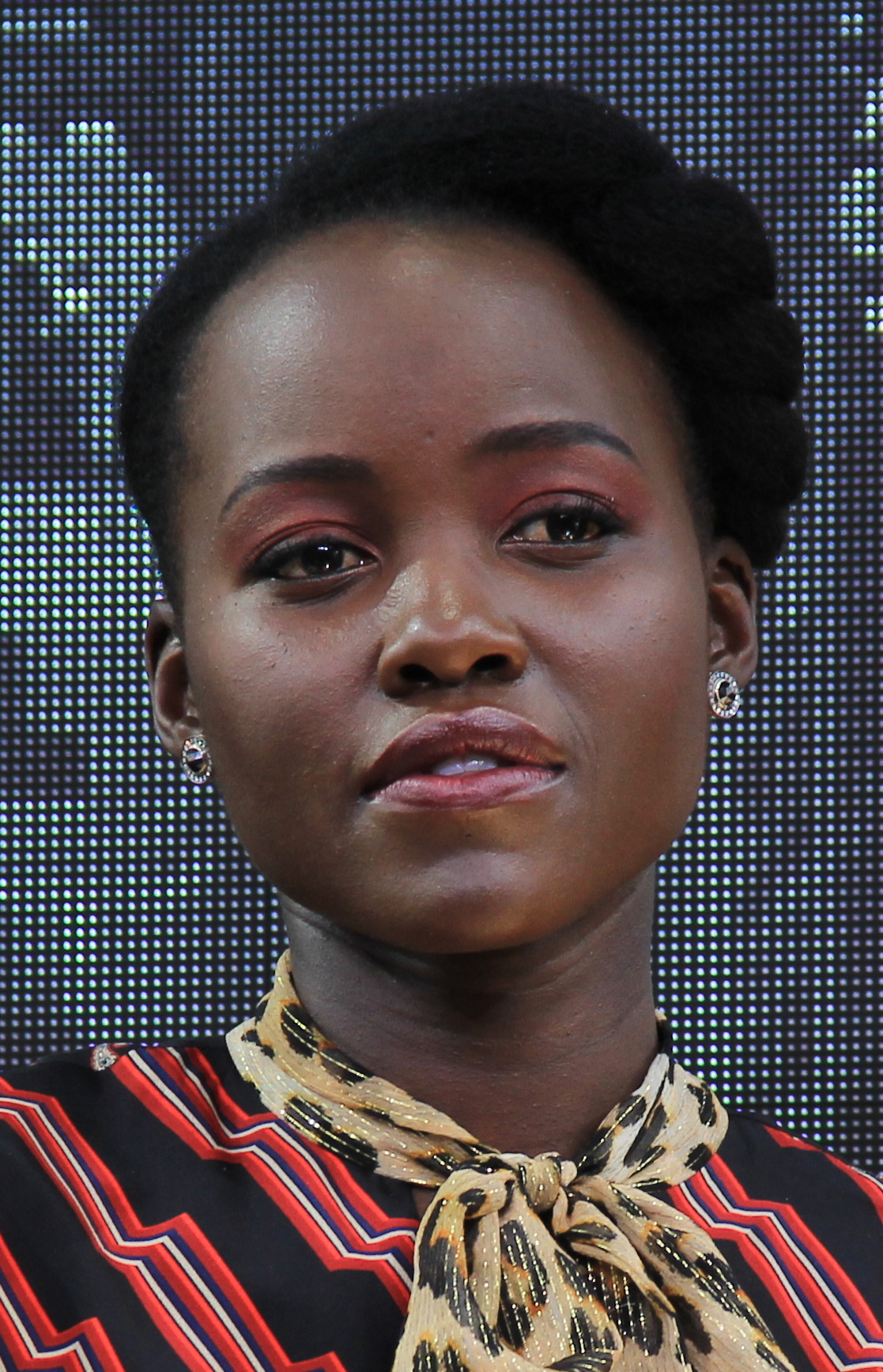
Lupita Nyong'o, Best Supporting Actress winner

=== Awards ===
Best Film	Best Director
12 Years a Slave - Brad Pitt, Dede Gardner, Jeremy Kleiner, Steve McQueen and Anthony Katagas: American Hustle - Charles Roven, Richard Suckle, Megan Ellison and Jonathan Gordon; Gravity - Alfonso Cuaron and David Heyman; Her - Megan Ellison, Spike Jonze and Vincent Landay; Inside Llewyn Davis - Scott Rudin, Ethan Coen and Joel Coen	Steve McQueen – 12 Years a Slave: Joel Coen and Ethan Coen – Inside Llewyn Davis; Alfonso Cuarón – Gravity; Spike Jonze – Her; David O. Russell – American Hustle
Best Actor	Best Actress
Chiwetel Ejiofor – 12 Years a Slave as Solomon Northup: Bruce Dern – Nebraska as Woodrow "Woody" T. Grant; Oscar Isaac – Inside Llewyn Davis as Llewyn Davis; Matthew McConaughey – Dallas Buyers Club as Ron Woodroof; Robert Redford – All Is Lost as Our Man	Cate Blanchett – Blue Jasmine as Jeanette "Jasmine" Francis: Sandra Bullock – Gravity as Dr. Ryan Stone; Adèle Exarchopoulos – Blue Is the Warmest Colour as; Brie Larson – Short Term 12 as Grace Howard; Meryl Streep – August: Osage County as Violet Weston
Best Supporting Actor	Best Supporting Actress
Jared Leto – Dallas Buyers Club as Rayon: Barkhad Abdi – Captain Phillips as Abduwali Muse; Michael Fassbender – 12 Years a Slave as Edwin Epps; James Franco – Spring Breakers as Alien; James Gandolfini – Enough Said as Albert	Lupita Nyong'o – 12 Years a Slave as Patsey: Scarlett Johansson – Her as Samantha; Jennifer Lawrence – American Hustle as Rosalyn Rosenfeld; Léa Seydoux – Blue Is the Warmest Colour as Emma; June Squibb – Nebraska as Kate Grant
Best Original Screenplay	Best Adapted Screenplay
Her – Spike Jonze: American Hustle – Eric Warren Singer and David O. Russell; Blue Jasmine – Woody Allen; Inside Llewyn Davis – Joel Coen and Ethan Coen; Nebraska – Bob Nelson	12 Years a Slave – John Ridley based on the book by Solomon Northup: August: Osage County – Tracy Letts based on the play by John Wells; Before Midnight – Richard Linklater, Julie Delpy, and Ethan Hawke based on characters created by Richard Linklater and Kin Krizan; Philomena – Steve Coogan and Jeff Pope based on the book by Martin Sixsmith; The Wolf of Wall Street – Terence Winter based on the memoir by Jordan Belfort
Best Animated Film	Best Foreign Language Film
The Wind Rises - Hayao Miyazaki and Toshio Suzuki: The Croods - Kirk DeMicco, Chris Sanders and Kristine Belson; From Up on Poppy Hill - Goro Miyazaki and Toshio Suzuki; Frozen - Chris Buck, Jennifer Lee and Peter Del Vecho; Monsters University - Dan Scanlon and Kori Rae	The Act of Killing (Indonesia) in Indonesian - Directed by Joshua Oppenheimer: Blue Is the Warmest Colour (France) in French - Directed by Abdellatif Kechiche; The Hunt (Denmark) in Danish - Directed by Thomas Vinterberg; Wadjda (Saudi Arabia) in Arabic - Directed by Haifaa al-Mansour; The Wind Rises (Japan) in Japanese - Directed by Hayao Miyazaki
Best Documentary Film	Best Original Score
The Act of Killing - Joshua Oppenheimmer and Signe Byrge Sorensen: 20 Feet from Stardom - Morgan Neville, Caitrin Rogers and Gil Friesen; The Armstrong Lie - Alex Gibney, Frank Marshall and Matt Tolmach; Blackfish - Gabriela Cowperthwaite and Manuel V. Oteyza; Stories We Tell - Sarah Polley, Anita Lee & Silva Basmajian	Her – Arcade Fire: 12 Years a Slave – Hans Zimmer; Blancanieves – Alfonso de Vilallonga; Gravity – Steven Price; Spring Breakers – Cliff Martinez and Skrillex
Best Production Design	Best Editing
Gravity - Production Design: Andy Nicholson; Set Decoration: Rosie Goodwin and Joanne Woollard: 12 Years a Slave - Production Design: Adam Stockhausen; Set Decoration: Alice Baker; The Great Gatsby - Production Design: Catherine Martin; Set Decoration: Beverley Dunn; Her - Production Design: K.K. Barrett; Set Decoration: Gene Serdena; Inside Llewyn Davis - Production Design: Deborah Jensen; Set Decoration: Susan Bode	Gravity – Alfonso Cuarón and Mark Sanger: 12 Years a Slave – Joe Walker; American Hustle – Alan Baumgarten, Jay Cassidy, and Crispin Struthers; Upstream Color – Shane Carruth and David Lowery; The Wolf of Wall Street – Thelma Schoonmaker
Best Cinematography	
Gravity – Emmanuel Lubezki: 12 Years a Slave – Sean Bobbitt; Her – Hoyte van Hoytema; Inside Llewyn Davis – Bruno Delbonnel; Prisoners – Roger Deakins
Most Promising Filmmaker	Most Promising Performer
Destin Daniel Cretton – Short Term 12: Lake Bell – In a World...; Ryan Coogler – Fruitvale Station; Joseph Gordon-Levitt – Don Jon; Joshua Oppenheimer – The Act of Killing	Adèle Exarchopoulos – Blue Is the Warmest Colour as Adele: Barkhad Abdi – Captain Phillips as Abduwali Muse; Chadwick Boseman – 42 as Jackie Robinson; Lupita Nyong'o – 12 Years a Slave as Patsey; Tye Sheridan – Mud as Ellis

== Awards breakdown ==
The following films received multiple nominations:

Nominations	Film
12	12 Years a Slave
7	Gravity
7	Her
6	Inside Llewlyn Davis
5	American Hustle
4	Blue is the Warmest Colour
3	Nebraska
3	The Act of Killing
2	August: Osage County
2	Blue Jasmine
2	Captain Phillips
2	Dallas Buyers Club
2	Spring Breakers
2	Short Term 12
2	The Wind Rises
2	The Wolf of Wall Street

The following films received multiple wins:

Wins	Film
5	12 Years a Slave
3	Gravity
2	Her
2	The Act of Killing
