= Critics' Choice Movie Award for Best Documentary Feature =

Award given by the Broadcast Film Critics Association

The Critics' Choice Movie Award for Best Documentary Feature is a retired award given to people working in the motion picture industry by the Broadcast Film Critics Association from 1995 to 2015. In 2016, the association started a new set of awards for documentary features called the Critics' Choice Documentary Awards.

== List of winners and nominees ==
=== 1990s ===
- 1995: Crumb
- 1996: When We Were Kings
- 1997: 4 Little Girls
- 1998: Wild Man Blues
- 1999: Buena Vista Social Club

=== 2000s ===
- 2000: The Life and Times of Hank Greenberg
- 2001: N/A
- 2002: Bowling for Columbine
  - The Kid Stays in the Picture
  - Standing in the Shadows of Motown
- 2003: Capturing the Friedmans
  - The Fog of War
  - Ghosts of the Abyss
- 2004: Fahrenheit 9/11
  - Control Room
  - Metallica: Some Kind of Monster
  - Super Size Me
- 2005: March of the Penguins
  - Enron: The Smartest Guys in the Room
  - Grizzly Man
  - Mad Hot Ballroom
  - Murderball
- 2006: An Inconvenient Truth
  - Dixie Chicks: Shut Up and Sing
  - This Film Is Not Yet Rated
  - Who Killed the Electric Car?
  - Wordplay
- 2007: Sicko
  - Darfur Now
  - In the Shadow of the Moon
  - The King of Kong: A Fistful of Quarters
  - No End in Sight
  - Sharkwater
- 2008: Man on Wire
  - Darfur Now
  - I.O.U.S.A.
  - Roman Polanski: Wanted and Desired
  - Standard Operating Procedure
  - Young@Heart
- 2009: The Cove
  - Anvil! The Story of Anvil
  - Capitalism: A Love Story
  - Food, Inc.
  - Michael Jackson's This Is It

=== 2010s ===
- 2010: Waiting for "Superman"
  - Exit Through the Gift Shop
  - Inside Job
  - Joan Rivers: A Piece of Work
  - Restrepo
  - The Tillman Story
- 2011: George Harrison: Living in the Material World
  - Buck
  - Cave of Forgotten Dreams
  - Page One: Inside the New York Times
  - Project Nim
  - Undefeated
- 2012: Searching for Sugar Man
  - Bully
  - The Central Park Five
  - The Imposter
  - The Queen of Versailles
  - West of Memphis
- 2013: 20 Feet from Stardom
  - The Act of Killing
  - Blackfish
  - Stories We Tell
  - Tim's Vermeer
- 2014: Life Itself
  - Citizenfour
  - Glen Campbell: I'll Be Me
  - Jodorowsky's Dune
  - Last Days in Vietnam
  - The Overnighters
- 2015: Amy
  - Cartel Land
  - Going Clear
  - He Named Me Malala
  - The Look of Silence
  - Where to Invade Next

== See also ==
- Academy Award for Best Documentary Feature
- BAFTA Award for Best Documentary
- Critics' Choice Documentary Award for Best Documentary Feature
- Golden Globe Award for Best Documentary Film
- Independent Spirit Award for Best Documentary Feature
