= Houston Film Critics Society Awards 2013 =

Annual US film awards ceremony

7th Houston Film Critics Society Awards
- Date: December 15, 2013
- Location: Museum of Fine Arts; Houston, Texas
- Country: United States
- Presented by: Houston Film Critics Society
- Website: houstonfilmcritics.com/awards

The 7th Houston Film Critics Society Awards nominations were announced on the December 8, 2013. The 2013 awards were given out at a ceremony held at the Museum of Fine Arts on December 15, 2013. The awards are presented annually by the Houston Film Critics Society based in Houston, Texas.

== Winners and nominees ==
Winners are listed first and highlighted with boldface.

Best Picture	Best Foreign Language Film
**12 Years a Slave**; All Is Lost; American Hustle; Before Midnight; Dallas Buyers Club; Fruitvale Station; Gravity; Inside Llewyn Davis; Nebraska; Saving Mr. Banks	**The Hunt** • Danish; Blue Is the Warmest Colour • French; The Grandmaster • Hong Kong; Wadjda • Saudi Arabian; The Wind Rises • Japanese
Best Performance by an Actor in a Leading Role	Best Performance by an Actress in a Leading Role
**Chiwetel Ejiofor** – **12 Years a Slave**; Christian Bale – American Hustle; Bruce Dern – Nebraska; Matthew McConaughey – Dallas Buyers Club; Mads Mikkelsen – The Hunt; Robert Redford – All Is Lost	**Sandra Bullock** – **Gravity**; Judi Dench – Philomena; Brie Larson – Short Term 12; Meryl Streep – August: Osage County; Emma Thompson – Saving Mr. Banks
Best Performance by an Actor in a Supporting Role	Best Performance by an Actress in a Supporting Role
**Jared Leto** – **Dallas Buyers Club**; Barkhad Abdi – Captain Phillips; Michael Fassbender – 12 Years a Slave; James Gandolfini – Enough Said; Matthew McConaughey – Mud	**Lupita Nyong'o** – **12 Years a Slave**; Jennifer Lawrence – American Hustle; Octavia Spencer – Fruitvale Station; June Squibb – Nebraska; Oprah Winfrey – The Butler
Best Direction of a Motion Picture	Best Cinematography
**Alfonso Cuarón** – **Gravity**; Joel and Ethan Coen – Inside Llewyn Davis; Paul Greengrass – Captain Phillips; Steve McQueen – 12 Years a Slave; Alexander Payne – Nebraska	**Gravity** – **Emmanuel Lubezki**; 12 Years a Slave – Sean Bobbitt; All Is Lost – Frank G. DeMarco; Inside Llewyn Davis – Bruno Delbonnel; Prisoners – Roger A. Deakins
Best Animated Feature Film	Best Documentary Feature
**Frozen**; The Croods; Despicable Me 2; Monsters University; The Wind Rises	**20 Feet from Stardom**; The Act of Killing; Blackfish; Inequality for All; Stories We Tell
Best Original Score	Best Original Song
**Gravity** – **Steven Price**; 12 Years a Slave – Hans Zimmer; Her – Arcade Fire; Man of Steel – Hans Zimmer; Saving Mr. Banks – Thomas Newman	**"Please Mr. Kennedy"** by **Ed Rush**, **George Cromarty**, **T Bone Burnett**, **Justin Timberlake** and **Joel and Ethan Coen** – **Inside Llewyn Davis**; "I See Fire" by Ed Sheeran – The Hobbit: The Desolation of Smaug; "Let It Go" by Robert Lopez and Kristen Anderson-Lopez – Frozen; "The Moon Song" by Karen O – Her; "Young and Beautiful" by Lana Del Rey – The Great Gatsby
Best Screenplay	Worst Film
**12 Years a Slave** – **John Ridley**; American Hustle – David O. Russell and Eric Warren Singer; Before Midnight – Richard Linklater, Julie Delpy and Ethan Hawke; Her – Spike Jonze; Inside Llewyn Davis – Joel and Ethan Coen	**Grown Ups 2**; A Good Day to Die Hard; The Lone Ranger; Olympus Has Fallen; Scary Movie 5

=== Individual awards ===
==== Outstanding Cinematic Contribution ====
- **Eric Harrison**

==== Technical Achievement ====
- **Gravity**
