= 20 Feet from Stardom =

2013 American documentary film

- Theatrical release poster
- Directed by: Morgan Neville
- Produced by: Gil Friesen; Caitrin Rogers; Michael Ross; Steve Jacobs
- Starring: Darlene Love; Merry Clayton; Lisa Fischer; Judith Hill; Jo Lawry; Claudia Lennear; Tata Vega
- Cinematography: Nicola Marsh; Graham Willoughby
- Edited by: Kevin Klauber; Jason Zeldes
- Music by: Various Artists
- Production companies: Tremolo Productions; Gil Friesen Productions
- Distributed by: RADiUS-TWC
- Release dates: January 17, 2013 (Sundance); June 14, 2013 (United States)
- Running time: 90 minutes
- Country: United States
- Language: English
- Budget: $1 million
- Box office: $5.8 million

20 Feet from Stardom is a 2013 American documentary film directed by Morgan Neville and produced by Gil Friesen, a music industry executive whose curiosity to know more about the lives of background singers inspired the making of the film. Using archival footage and new interviews, it details the behind-the-scenes experiences of such backup singers as Darlene Love, Merry Clayton, Lisa Fischer, Judith Hill, Jo Lawry, Claudia Lennear, and Tata Vega. The film won the Academy Award for Best Documentary Feature at the 86th Academy Awards, 22 years after In the Shadow of the Stars (1991), a similar documentary that focused on the members of an opera chorus, won the same award.

Lisa Fischer has described backup singing: "I reject the notion that the job you excel at is somehow not enough to aspire to, that there has to be something more. I love supporting other artists." She added: "Some people will do anything to be famous. I just wanted to sing."

In 2023, the film was selected for preservation in the United States National Film Registry by the Library of Congress as being "culturally, historically, or aesthetically significant." It is the eighth film designated in its first year of eligibility, as well as the third most recently released film in the Registry.

== Cast ==
- Lou Adler
- Stevvi Alexander
- Patti Austin
- Chris Botti
- Merry Clayton
- Charlotte Crossley
- Sheryl Crow
- Lisa Fischer
- Susaye Greene
- Judith Hill
- Cissy Houston
- Mick Jagger
- Mable John
- Gloria Jones
- David Lasley
- Jo Lawry
- Claudia Lennear
- Darlene Love
- Lynn Mabry
- Bette Midler
- Cindy Mizelle
- Janice Pendarvis
- Nicki Richards
- Bruce Springsteen
- Sting
- Rose Stone (née Stewart)
- Tata Vega
- Martha Wash
- The Waters (Oren, Julia, and Maxine Waters)
- Stevie Wonder

Archival footage

- David Bowie
- Ray Charles
- Ava Cherry
- Michael Jackson
- Elton John
- Tom Jones
- David Letterman
- Kylie Minogue
- Ike & Tina Turner
- Luther Vandross

== Release ==
On January 17, 2013, 20 Feet from Stardom premiered at the Sundance Film Festival. It was acquired by Radius-The Weinstein Company at the festival and was released nationwide in the United States on June 14, 2013. The film was acquired for international distribution by Elle Driver / Wild Bunch. Some of the many other film festivals that screened the film in 2013 include South by Southwest Film Festival, True/False Film Festival, Full Frame Documentary Film Festival, Hawaii International Film Festival, Philadelphia Music Film Festival, RiverRun Film Festival, San Francisco Film Festival, Seattle International Film Festival, and Montclair Film Festival.

== Reception ==
=== Box office ===
The film was a box office success, grossing $4,946,445 at the domestic box office, and $898,560 internationally, for a worldwide total of $5,845,005.

=== Critical reception ===
20 Feet from Stardom received critical acclaim. On review aggregator website Rotten Tomatoes, it has a 99% approval rating based on 126 reviews, with an average score of 8.0/10; the site's "critics consensus" reads: "Rich, insightful, and occasionally heartbreaking, 20 Feet From Stardom is an energetic tribute to the passion, talent, and hard work of backup singers." On Metacritic, the film has a weighted average score of 83 out of 100, based on 25 reviews, indicating "universal acclaim".

The Ithaca Times compared the film to the 2012 book The Wrecking Crew: The Inside Story of Rock and Roll's Best-Kept Secret, which focuses on uncredited studio musicians from the same era as the one that features most prominently in the film.

=== Accolades ===
At the 86th Academy Awards ceremony, held on March 2, 2014, the film won the Academy Award for Best Documentary Feature. It also won the award for Best Documentary Film at the 19th Critics' Choice Awards. At the 57th Grammy Awards, the film won the award for Best Music Film.

Accolades for 20 Feet from Stardom
Award / Film Festival	Category	Recipient(s)	Result
86th Academy Awards	Best Documentary Feature	Morgan Neville, Gil Friesen, and Caitrin Rogers	Won
AARP Annual Movies for Grownups Awards	Best Documentary	20 Feet from Stardom	Won
ACE Awards	Best Edited Documentary – Feature	Douglas Blush, Kevin Klauber, and Jason Zeldes	Won
Amsterdam International Documentary Film Festival	Music Documentary Audience Award	20 Feet from Stardom	Won
2014 Black Reel Awards	Outstanding Documentary	20 Feet from Stardom	Won
2014 Black Reel Awards	Outstanding Original Song	"Desperation" – Judith Hill	Won
2013 Chicago Film Critics Association	Best Documentary Film	20 Feet from Stardom	Nominated
19th Critics' Choice Awards	Best Documentary Film	20 Feet from Stardom	Won
2013 Dallas–Fort Worth Film Critics Association Awards	Best Documentary Film	20 Feet from Stardom	Won
2013 Denver Film Critics Society Awards	Best Documentary Film	20 Feet from Stardom	Nominated
Golden Reel Awards	Best Sound Editing - Documentary Feature Film	Al Nelson, Kim Foscato, and Pete Horner	Nominated
57th Grammy Awards	Best Music Film	Morgan Neville (director), Gil Friesen, Caitrin Rogers (producers), Darlene Love, Merry Clayton, Lisa Fischer, and Judith Hill	Won
2013 Houston Film Critics Society Awards	Best Documentary Feature	20 Feet from Stardom	Won
29th Independent Spirit Awards	Best Documentary Feature	20 Feet from Stardom – Morgan Neville, Gil Friesen, and Caitrin Rogers	Won
Iowa Film Critics	Best Documentary	20 Feet from Stardom	Won
NAACP Image Awards	Outstanding Documentary – Theatrical	20 Feet from Stardom	Nominated
2013 National Board of Review Awards	Best Documentary	20 Feet from Stardom	Nominated
2013 New York Film Critics Circle Awards	Best Non-Fiction Film	20 Feet from Stardom	Nominated
2013 St. Louis Gateway Film Critics Association Awards	Best Documentary	20 Feet from Stardom	Nominated
2013 San Diego Film Critics Society Awards	Best Documentary Film	20 Feet from Stardom	Nominated
18th Satellite Awards	Best Documentary Film	20 Feet from Stardom	Nominated
2013 Seattle International Film Festival	Best Documentary	20 Feet from Stardom	Won
2013 Washington D.C. Area Film Critics Association Awards	Best Documentary	20 Feet from Stardom	Nominated

== See also ==
- 20 Feet from Stardom (soundtrack)
