= Matt Moore =

Matthew Moore or Matt Moore may refer to:

- Matt Moore (actor) (1888–1960), Irish-born American film actor
- Matt Moore (American football) (born 1984), American football quarterback
- Matt Moore (basketball), National Basketball League player
- Matt Moore (musician) (born 1979), guitarist, vocalist, and video director from Southern Missouri
- Matt Moore (baseball) (born 1989), Major League Baseball player
- Matt Moore (politician) (born 1982), American politician
- Matthew Moore (singer), American songwriter who collaborated with Joe Cocker and Leon Russell
- Matthew Moore (footballer), Irish footballer
