= Linda Martinez =

Linda Martinez (December 2, 1975 – May 19, 2005) was an American pianist and composer, particularly for film and television.

== Life ==
Martinez grew up in Whittier, California. She was a child prodigy: aged four, she began studies with the Yamaha Music Education System in Orange County, continuing in the after-school program until she was 12. In 1991 in Tokyo she won Yamaha's International Junior Original Concert Composition Competition.

She later studied at the USC Thornton School of Music, and in 1998 gained a degree in music composition. In that year she was a keyboardist for The Keenen Ivory Wayans Show, and this led to appearances with other artists. In 2000 she toured with Destiny's Child, and composed music for their live shows.

She wrote music for programs on the History Channel. She wrote film scores, and won in 2003 the National Turner Classic Movies Young Film Composers’ Competition; this won her the opportunity to compose the score for the silent film The Rag Man.

She was among the musicians who performed at the Walt Disney Concert Hall (which opened in 2003) with the Los Angeles Master Chorale, and Sheila E. and Alex Acuña.

Linda Martinez died by suicide in 2005, aged 29. Donald Crockett, a USC professor of composition, said: "She was one of the two or three most gifted young composers we’ve ever had". Her mentor, the composer Laura Karpman, with whom she worked on music for film and television, said: "She was a huge, huge talent".
