= Matt Moore (basketball) =

Australian basketball player

Matthew "Maddog" Moore is a former National Basketball League basketballer from Townsville Queensland, who won a NBL Championship with South East Melbourne Magic in 1996 and played in the 1997 NBL Final Series. He also played for Brisbane Bullets and Newcastle Falcons. Moore is the brother of former rugby league state of Origin and Test player Danny Moore.
