= The Hunt (2012 film) =

2012 film directed by Thomas Vinterberg

- Danish theatrical release poster
- Danish: Jagten
- Directed by: Thomas Vinterberg
- Written by: Tobias Lindholm; Thomas Vinterberg
- Produced by: Morten Kaufmann; Sisse Graum Jørgensen; Thomas Vinterberg
- Starring: Mads Mikkelsen
- Cinematography: Charlotte Bruus Christensen
- Edited by: Anne Østerud; Janus Billeskov Jansen
- Music by: Nikolaj Egelund
- Production company: Zentropa
- Distributed by: Nordisk Film
- Release dates: 20 May 2012 (Cannes); 10 January 2013 (Denmark)
- Running time: 115 minutes
- Country: Denmark
- Languages: Danish; English
- Budget: $3.45 million
- Box office: $18.3 million

The Hunt (Danish: Jagten) is a 2012 Danish psychological drama film co-written, produced and directed by Thomas Vinterberg and starring Mads Mikkelsen. Set in a small Danish village around Christmas, the film follows a man named Lucas, a divorced kindergarten teacher who becomes the target of mass hysteria after being accused of sexually abusing a child in his class.

The film gained critical acclaim for Mikkelsen's performance and Vinterberg's direction. Many have described it as one of the best psychological drama films of its time. It competed at the 65th Cannes Film Festival, where Mikkelsen won the Best Actor Award for his role, and was also screened at the 2012 Toronto International Film Festival, among other film festivals. It won the 2013 Nordic Council Film Prize and was one of the nominees for Best Foreign Language Film at the 71st Golden Globe Awards. It was the Danish entry for the Best Foreign Language Film category at the 86th Academy Awards and was selected as one of the final five nominees.

== Plot ==
Lucas is a member of a close-knit rural Danish community and works at a local kindergarten, where he gets along well with the children. He misses his teenage son, Marcus, who lives with his ex-wife after their recent divorce. However, Lucas' fortune seems to take a turn after Marcus states he would prefer to live with his father and Lucas starts dating Nadja, a co-worker at the kindergarten.

Klara, the daughter of Lucas' best friend Theo and a pupil at the kindergarten, has a tendency to wander off on her own when her parents argue; Lucas occasionally happens upon her when she is alone and helps her out. He accommodates her aversion to stepping on cracks and says she can walk his dog, Fanny, whenever she wants. Over time, Klara develops a crush on Lucas; when she kisses him on the mouth and gives him a small gift, he gently rebuffs her, leaving her dejected.

Using details from a pornographic picture shown to her by her older brother's friend, Klara makes comments that lead Grethe, the director of the kindergarten, to believe Lucas indecently exposed himself to her. Grethe informs Lucas of the allegation but is unable to tell him of the details; she then invites an acquaintance to interview Klara, and after she nods in response to the man's leading questions, Grethe, who does not believe that children lie about such things, alerts the authorities and informs the parents of the children who attend the kindergarten. Klara later contradicts her initial story, but the adults see this as stemming from denial of her ordeal.

Lucas subsequently loses his job and his friendship with Theo, and is shunned by the community. Due to the vague language used and the secrecy around the investigation, he does not know specifically what he is accused of, but eventually hears he may have been accused of abusing multiple children. The strain of this revelation leads him to end his relationship with Nadja, as Lucas believes she doubts his innocence.

Marcus runs away from his mother to be with Lucas. After a trip to the grocery store, where he is told that neither he nor his father is welcome, he sees Lucas being arrested by the police. Locked out of the house, Marcus goes to ask Theo for a spare key but ends up fighting with several adults for confronting Klara, having asked why she lied about his father. He is taken in by Bruun, one of Lucas' friends who believes him to be innocent. Bruun tells Marcus that Lucas has a hearing in the morning and he is hopeful the case against him will be dropped, since he has heard that the fabricated accounts of many children mention a "basement" in Lucas' house, which does not have one.

Lucas is released from custody and reunites with Marcus. An unseen man murders Lucas' dog, Fanny, and throws a large stone through his window. Lucas sends Marcus back to his ex-wife for his safety and buries his dog. While shopping for groceries on Christmas Eve, the staff assault Lucas and throw him out; however, the latter returns and headbutts the butcher to get his groceries back. Theo and his wife notice Lucas limp out of the store, bleeding from his head. During a Christmas church service, Lucas attacks Theo in front of the congregation and challenges him to look in his eyes for a sign he is lying about his innocence; Theo had previously stated he "could always tell" if Lucas was lying. When Theo visits Klara in her bedroom that night, she admits that Lucas did not do anything bad to her. Theo then brings Lucas food and alcohol, as the two men sit together and talk.

By the next fall, tensions in the community seem all but gone, Lucas's friends greet him as before, and he and Nadja have reconciled. Marcus receives his first rifle at a ceremony at Bruun's house. Afterwards, Lucas and Klara reunite and he carries her in his arms so she can avoid stepping on cracks. The adult men go hunting on the surrounding estate; when Lucas is by himself, a bullet barely misses him and hits a tree. He turns and watches as the shooter, silhouetted against the sun, reloads his rifle and points it at Lucas for a moment before fleeing. Lucas, shaken, stands in silence.

== Cast ==
- Mads Mikkelsen as Lucas
- Thomas Bo Larsen as Theo, Lucas' best friend, Agnes' husband, and Klara's father
- Annika Wedderkopp as Klara, Theo and Agnes' daughter
- Lasse Fogelstrøm as Marcus, Lucas' son
- Susse Wold as Grethe, Lucas' boss
- Anne Louise Hassing as Agnes, Theo's wife and Klara's mother
- Lars Ranthe as Bruun, Lucas' friend, Marcus' godfather
- Alexandra Rapaport as Nadja, Lucas' girlfriend
- Sebastian Bull Sarning as Torsten, Theo and Agnes' son, Klara's older brother, and Marcus' friend
- Bjarne Henriksen as Ole

== Production ==
The film was produced by Zentropa for 20 million Danish kroner. It received co-production support from Sweden's Film i Väst and Zentropa International Sweden. Further support came from the Danish Film Institute, DR, Eurimages, Nordisk Film & TV Fond, the Swedish Film Institute, Sveriges Television, and the MEDIA Programme.

== Release ==
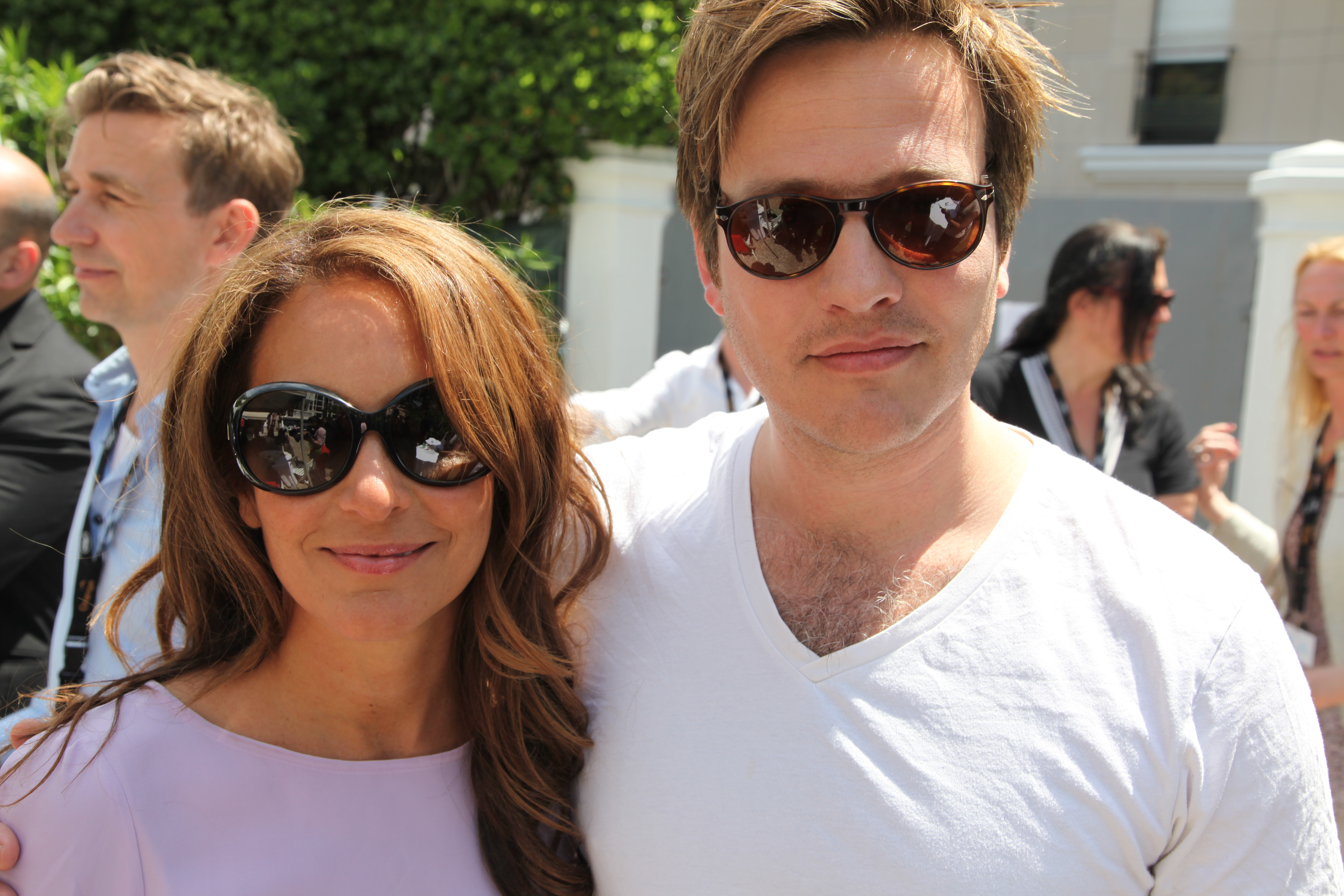
Alexandra Rapaport and Thomas Vinterberg at the 2012 Cannes Film Festival

The Hunt premiered on 20 May 2012 at the Cannes Film Festival, where it was the first Danish-language film in the main competition since 1998. Mads Mikkelsen won the Best Actor Award at the festival.

The film was released on DVD and Blu-ray in the United States on 10 December 2013.

== Reception ==
=== Box office ===
Given its estimated $3.8 million budget, the film was a financial success. Worldwide, it earned more than $16 million, including $7.9 million in Denmark. In the United States, it was shown in 47 theaters and earned $613,308.

=== Critical response ===
On the review aggregator website Rotten Tomatoes, the film holds an approval rating of 92% based on 131 reviews, with an average rating of 7.8/10. The site's critical consensus reads: "Anchored by Mads Mikkelsen's sympathetic performance, The Hunt asks difficult questions with the courage to pursue answers head on." On Metacritic, it has a weighted average score of 77 out of 100 based on 30 critics, indicating "generally favorable reviews".

The performance of Mads Mikkelsen as Lucas received widespread acclaim. Phillip French of The Guardian awarded the film four out of five stars, describing it as "gripping, unbearably tense, yet capable of great subtlety and nuance," and praised Mikkelsen as "one of the finest actors at work today." For his role, Mikkelsen won the Best Actor Award at the 2012 Cannes Film Festival. Writing for Variety, Peter Debruge called the performance impressive, with Mikkelsen cast against type as a warm-hearted man who finds himself caught up in a situation way beyond his control, making Lucas’ immediate isolation and subsequent frustration tangible. Critics also praised Thomas Vinterberg's direction and the screenplay he co-wrote with Tobias Lindholm. David Rooney of The Hollywood Reporter described the film as the Danish director's most powerful since The Celebration (1998) with the charge of pedophilia playing an explosive role in a chilling study of communal hysteria. Rooney commended the script's construction and the director's ability to build tension.

In his review for the Chicago Sun-Times, Ignatiy Vishnevetsky of RogerEbert.com gave the film three out of four stars, calling it thematically rich but limited by its style, and noting its power in depicting how a community can band together against an individual in the guise of combating evil. Some reviews highlighted the film's provocative and unsettling nature. A. O. Scott of The New York Times wrote that the film "is a merciless examination of the fear and savagery roiling just below the surface of bourgeois life."

The film's ambiguous ending also generated considerable discussion among critics, who interpreted it as a statement on the permanent scars left by false accusations. In 2025, The Hunt was one of the films voted for the "Readers' Choice" edition of The New York Times's list of "The 100 Best Movies of the 21st Century," finishing at number 268.

=== Accolades ===
| Award | Date of ceremony | Category | Recipient(s) | Result |
|---|---|---|---|---|
| Academy Awards | 2 March 2014 | Best Foreign Language Film | | Nominated |
| Alliance of Women Film Journalists | 19 December 2013 | Best Foreign Language Film | Thomas Vinterberg | Won |
| British Academy Film Awards | 10 February 2013 | Best Film not in the English Language | | Nominated |
| British Independent Film Awards | 9 December 2012 | Best Foreign Independent Film | Thomas Vinterberg | Won |
| Bodil Awards | 1 February 2014 | Best Danish Film | | Won |
| Bodil Awards | 1 February 2014 | Best Actor | Mads Mikkelsen | Won |
| Bodil Awards | 1 February 2014 | Best Supporting Actor | Thomas Bo Larsen | Nominated |
| Bodil Awards | 1 February 2014 | Best Supporting Actor | Lars Ranthe | Nominated |
| Bodil Awards | 1 February 2014 | Best Supporting Actress | Anne Louise Hassing | Nominated |
| Bodil Awards | 1 February 2014 | Best Supporting Actress | Susse Wold | Won |
| Bodil Awards | 1 February 2014 | Best Cinematography | Charlotte Bruus Christensen | Won |
| Cannes Film Festival | 27 May 2012 | Best Actor | Mads Mikkelsen | Won |
| Cannes Film Festival | 27 May 2012 | Prize of the Ecumenical Jury | Thomas Vinterberg | Won |
| Cannes Film Festival | 27 May 2012 | Vulcan Award | Charlotte Bruus Christensen | Won |
| Cannes Film Festival | 27 May 2012 | Palme d'Or | Thomas Vinterberg | Nominated |
| Chicago Film Critics Association Awards | 16 December 2013 | Best Foreign Language Film | | Nominated |
| Critics' Choice Awards | 16 January 2014 | Best Foreign Language Film | | Nominated |
| Dallas–Fort Worth Film Critics Association | 16 December 2013 | Best Foreign Language Film | | Nominated |
| Satellite Awards | 23 February 2014 | Best Foreign Language Film | | Nominated |
| European Film Awards | 1 December 2012 | Best Film | Thomas Vinterberg | Nominated |
| European Film Awards | 1 December 2012 | Best Director | Thomas Vinterberg | Nominated |
| European Film Awards | 1 December 2012 | Best Actor | Mads Mikkelsen | Nominated |
| European Film Awards | 1 December 2012 | Best Screenwriter | Thomas Vinterberg, Tobias Lindholm | Won |
| European Film Awards | 1 December 2012 | Best Editor | Janus Billeskov Jansen, Anne Østerud | Nominated |
| Golden Globe Awards | 12 January 2014 | Best Foreign Language Film | | Nominated |
| Independent Spirit Awards | 1 March 2014 | Best Foreign Film | | Nominated |
| London Film Critics Circle Awards | 20 January 2013 | Actor of the Year | Mads Mikkelsen | Nominated |
| National Board of Review Awards | 4 December 2013 | Top Foreign Films | | Won |
| Nordic Council Film Prize | 30 October 2013 | Nordic Council Film Prize | Thomas Vinterberg | Won |
| Online Film Critics Society Awards | 16 December 2013 | Best Actor | Mads Mikkelsen | Nominated |
| Robert Awards | 27 January 2014 | Best Danish Film | Thomas Vinterberg | Won |
| Robert Awards | 27 January 2014 | Best Director | Thomas Vinterberg | Won |
| Robert Awards | 27 January 2014 | Best Original Screenplay | Thomas Vinterberg, Tobias Lindholm | Won |
| Robert Awards | 27 January 2014 | Best Actor | Mads Mikkelsen | Won |
| Robert Awards | 27 January 2014 | Best Supporting Actor | Thomas Bo Larsen | Nominated |
| Robert Awards | 27 January 2014 | Best Supporting Actress | Susse Wold | Won |
| Robert Awards | 27 January 2014 | Best Supporting Actress | Anne Louise Hassing | Nominated |
| Robert Awards | 27 January 2014 | Best Cinematography | Charlotte Bruus Christensen | Nominated |
| Robert Awards | 27 January 2014 | Best Editing | Anne Østerud, Janus Billeskov Jansen | Won |
| Robert Awards | 27 January 2014 | Best Production Design | Torben Stig Nielsen | Nominated |
| Robert Awards | 27 January 2014 | Best Costume Design | Manon Rasmussen | Nominated |
| Robert Awards | 27 January 2014 | Best Make-Up | Bjørg Serup | Nominated |
| Robert Awards | 27 January 2014 | Best Original Score | Nikolaj Egelund | Nominated |
| Robert Awards | 27 January 2014 | Best Sound | Kristian Eidnes Andersen, Thomas Jæger | Nominated |
| Robert Awards | 27 January 2014 | Audience Award - Best Drama | Thomas Vinterberg | Won |
| St. Louis Gateway Film Critics Association Awards | 16 December 2013 | Best Foreign Language Film | | Nominated |
| San Diego Film Critics Society Awards | 11 December 2013 | Best Foreign Language Film | | Nominated |
| Toronto Film Critics Association | 16 December 2013 | Best Foreign Language Film | | Runner-up |
| Vancouver International Film Festival | 12 October 2012 | Rogers People's Choice Award | Thomas Vinterberg | Won |
| Washington D.C. Area Film Critics Association Awards | 9 December 2013 | Best Foreign Language Film | | Nominated |

== Stage adaptation ==
The Hunt was adapted for the stage in 2019 by David Farr, and produced at the Almeida Theatre in London. The production was directed by Rupert Goold and starred Tobias Menzies as Lucas. The production ran between 19 June and 3 August 2019.

== See also ==
- List of submissions to the 86th Academy Awards for Best Foreign Language Film
- List of Danish submissions for the Academy Award for Best Foreign Language Film
- The Children's Hour
