= Sure on this shining night =

1938 song by Samuel Barber

Sure on this shining night, op.13 no.3 is an art song by composer Samuel Barber from his 1938 song cycle Four Songs. The work's text is taken from James Agee's poem "Descriptions of Elysium" which was published in his 1934 poetry collection Permit Me Voyage by the Yale Series of Younger Poets. One of Barber's most frequently performed works, the work displays Barber's Neo-Romantic lyricism with its classically oriented formal structure and carefully crafted interplay between solo voice and piano that emphasizes canonic imitation. In 1938 Barber created an orchestral arrangement for the song. Barber later reworked the art song into an SATB choral arrangement in 1961. The song has been recorded by sopranos Roberta Alexander, Elly Ameling, Martina Arroyo, Barbara Bonney, Greta Bradman, Barbara Hendricks, and Cheryl Studer; mezzo-sopranos Sasha Cooke, Jennifer Larmore and Marilyn Horne; baritones Gerald Finley and Thomas Hampson; tenors Stuart Skelton and Robert White; and choral ensembles Conspirare, The Esoterics, the Choir of Ormond College, and the Cambridge University Chamber Choir.

The same portion of the same poem was also set to music by composer Morten Lauridsen, as one of the four texts in his Nocturnes (2005), as well as composer Z. Randall Stroope.
