= Caitrin Rogers =

American documentary film producer

- Born: Pittsfield, Massachusetts, U.S.
- Education: Northfield Mount Hermon School; Occidental College
- Occupation: Film producer
- Years active: 2007–present

Caitrin Rogers is an American documentary film producer. She is best known for producing 20 Feet from Stardom (2013), which earned her an Academy Award, an Independent Spirit Award, and a Grammy Award.

== Early life and education ==
Rogers was born in Pittsfield, Massachusetts to Suzanne Nichols and John Rogers. She graduated from Northfield Mount Hermon School in 2000 and Occidental College in 2004.

== Career ==
Rogers began her film career as an editor a few years after graduation, moving to Los Angeles and working for a variety of companies such as MTV, VH1, BET and Disney.

She subsequently worked as an assistant editor on the films Once in a Lifetime: The Extraordinary Story of the New York Cosmos (2006) and Amazing Journey: The Story of The Who (2007).

In 2007, she began working for Passion Pictures as a producer on the film The Tillman Story (2010).

In 2014, she won an Academy Award for the film 20 Feet from Stardom (2013), which received excellent reviews, with the website Rotten Tomatoes giving it a 99% approval rating.

She also produced the miniseries Ugly Delicious (2018) and Shangri-La (2019), as well as the films The Black Godfather (2019) and Miss Americana (2020).

== Awards and nominations ==
Year	Award	Category	Nominated work	Result	Ref.
2012	33rd News & Documentary Emmy Awards	Outstanding Informational Programming – Long Form	The Tillman Story	Won	
2014	29th Independent Spirit Awards	Best Documentary Feature	20 Feet from Stardom	Won	
2014	86th Academy Awards	Best Documentary – Feature	20 Feet from Stardom	Won	
2015	68th British Academy Film Awards	Best Documentary	20 Feet from Stardom	Nominated	
2015	57th Annual Grammy Awards	Best Music Film	20 Feet from Stardom	Won	
2017	59th Annual Grammy Awards	Best Music Film	The Music of Strangers	Nominated	
2018	39th News & Documentary Emmy Awards	Outstanding Arts & Culture Documentary	The Music of Strangers	Nominated	
