= Jo Lawry =

Australian singer and musician

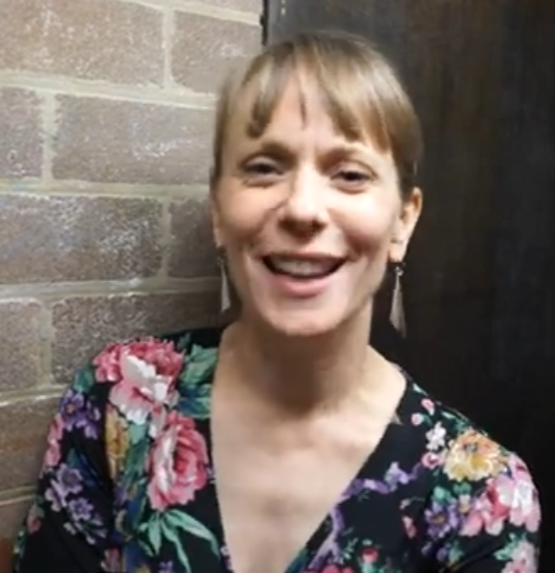
- In a 2022 interview

Background information
- Born: South Australia
- Genres: Pop, rock, jazz
- Occupation: Singer
- Years active: 2004–present
- Website: www.jolawry.net

Jo Lawry is an Australian singer and musician. Lawry's debut album, I Want to Be Happy, was released in 2008. Down Beat magazine gave it 4.5 out of 5 and selected it as one of the "Best CDs of the 2000s".

== Music career ==
Jo Lawry was raised on an almond farm in South Australia. She studied jazz at the University of Adelaide and the New England Conservatory of Music in Boston. In 2004, she reached the semi-finals in the Thelonious Monk International Jazz Competition, and the following year got second in the National Jazz Awards of Australia. In New York City, she met jazz pianist Fred Hersch and became a member of his Pocket Orchestra. She was also a member of James Shipp's Nos Novo, a jazz quartet for which she sang and played fiddle, mandolin, and melodica.

In 2009, Lawry began working with Sting after winning an audition to tour with him. She appeared on his DVD A Winter's Night... Live from Durham Cathedral and toured with him through 2015. She sang on the Live in Berlin album and DVD and on The Last Ship album and DVD. On her first album, I Want to Be Happy (2008), she sang a cover version of his song "Until". They performed a duet on "Impossiblé" from her second album, Taking Pictures. Their collaboration on the song "Practical Arrangement" appeared on Sting's Duets album in 2021. She also provided backing vocals for Sting's song "Captain Bateman" on his 2021 album The Bridge.

Lawry is featured in the documentary film 20 Feet from Stardom.

She was announced as the Head of Jazz at the Guildhall School of Music starting February 2024.

She is married to Will Vinson, a saxophonist from London.

== Discography ==
=== As leader ===
- I Want to Be Happy (Fleurieu, 2008)
- Taking Pictures (ABC Music, 2015)
- The Bathtub and the Sea (Fleurieu, 2017)
- Acrobats (Whirlwind, 2023)

=== As guest ===
With Sting

- Symphonicities (Deutsche Grammophon, 2010)
- Live in Berlin (Deutsche Grammophon, 2010)
- The Last Ship (A&M/Cherrytree, 2013)
- "Captain Bateman" - The Bridge (A&M/Cherrytree, 2021)

With others

- Quentin Angus, Perception (Aurora Sounds, 2013)
- Laila Biali, Laila Biali (ACT, 2018)
- Jonatha Brooke, Midnight. Hallelujah. (Bad Dog, 2016)
- Guy Klucevsek, The Multiple Personality Reunion Tour (Innova, 2012)
- Kate McGarry, If Less Is More... (Palmetto 2008)
- Karen Oberlin, Michael Winther, Waiting for the Angel: Songs with Words by David Hajdu (Miranda 2015)
- Jeremy Siskind, Simple Songs for When the World Seems Strange (Bju, 2010)
- Lonnie Smith, Rise Up! (Palmetto 2008)
- Becca Stevens, Regina (GroundUP, 2017)
