= Gil Friesen =

Gil Friesen (March 10, 1937 – December 13, 2012) was an American music and film executive known for being chairman of A&M Records from 1977 until its sale for $500 million in 1990, co-founder of the Classic Sports Cable Network and executive producer of The Breakfast Club in 1985.

== Biography ==
Born into a musical family in Pasadena, California, Friesen was a student at UCLA when he began his show-business career in the mail room at Capitol Records in California and later became a senior member of Kapp Records. He served as a promoter to Herb Alpert & the Tijuana Brass, The Carpenters, The Police, and Amy Grant.

He also produced the documentary 20 Feet from Stardom, which was released after he died and went on to win the Oscar for Best Documentary Feature. The film also won the 2015 Grammy Award for Best Music Film, with the award being presented to the featured artists as well as the production crew.

== Death ==
Friesen died of leukemia on December 13, 2012.
