= 2013 St. Louis Film Critics Association Awards =

Annual US film awards ceremony

10th StLFCA Awards

December 14, 2013

Best Film:
12 Years a Slave

Best Director:
Steve McQueen
12 Years a Slave

The nominees for the 10th St. Louis Film Critics Association Awards were announced on December 9, 2013.

== Winners, runners-up and nominees ==
=== Best Film ===
- 12 Years a Slave
  - Runner-up: American Hustle
- Gravity
- Her
- Nebraska

=== Best Actor ===
- Chiwetel Ejiofor – 12 Years a Slave
  - Runner-up: Matthew McConaughey – Dallas Buyers Club
- Christian Bale – American Hustle
- Bruce Dern – Nebraska
- Michael B. Jordan – Fruitvale Station

=== Best Supporting Actor ===
- Jared Leto – Dallas Buyers Club
  - Runner-up: Will Forte – Nebraska
- Barkhad Abdi – Captain Phillips
- Michael Fassbender – 12 Years a Slave
- Harrison Ford – 42

=== Best Original Screenplay ===
- Her – Spike Jonze
  - Runner-up: American Hustle – David O. Russell and Eric Warren Singer
- Enough Said – Nicole Holofcener
- Nebraska – Bob Nelson
- Saving Mr. Banks – Kelly Marcel and Sue Smith

=== Best Cinematography ===
- 12 Years a Slave – Sean Bobbitt
  - Runner-up: Gravity – Emmanuel Lubezki
- The Grandmaster – Philippe Le Sourd
- The Great Gatsby – Simon Duggan
- Inside Llewyn Davis – Bruno Delbonnel
- Nebraska – Phedon Papamichael

=== Best Music ===
- Arcade Fire - Her
  - Runner-up (tie): Steven Price - Gravity and Mark Orton - Nebraska
- Hans Zimmer - 12 Years a Slave
- Howard Shore - The Hobbit: The Desolation of Smaug
- Thomas Newman - Saving Mr. Banks

=== Best Art Direction ===
- The Great Gatsby
  - Runner-up: Her
- 12 Years a Slave
- The Grandmaster
- Inside Llewyn Davis

=== Best Foreign Language Film ===
- Blue Is the Warmest Colour • France
  - Runner-up Wadjda • Saudi Arabia / Germany
- A Hijacking • Denmark
- The Hunt • Denmark
- No • Chile

=== Best Animated Feature ===
- Frozen
  - Runner-up: The Wind Rises
- The Croods
- Despicable Me 2
- Monsters University

=== Best Scene ===
(favorite movie scene or sequence)

- 12 Years a Slave: The hanging scene
  - Runner-up: Gravity: Opening tracking shot
- Captain Phillips: The scene near the end of the film where Tom Hanks is being checked out by military medical personnel and he breaks down.
- Her: OS sex scene
- The Place Beyond the Pines: The opening scene where Ryan Gosling is walking through the carnival.

=== Best Director ===
- Steve McQueen – 12 Years a Slave
  - Runner-up: Alfonso Cuarón – Gravity
- Spike Jonze – Her
- Alexander Payne – Nebraska
- David O. Russell – American Hustle

=== Best Actress ===
- Cate Blanchett – Blue Jasmine
  - Runner-up: Meryl Streep – August: Osage County
- Amy Adams – American Hustle
- Sandra Bullock – Gravity
- Judi Dench – Philomena
- Emma Thompson – Saving Mr. Banks

=== Best Supporting Actress ===
- Lupita Nyong'o – 12 Years a Slave
  - Runner-up: June Squibb – Nebraska
- Scarlett Johansson – Her
- Jennifer Lawrence – American Hustle
- Léa Seydoux – Blue Is the Warmest Colour

=== Best Adapted Screenplay ===
- 12 Years a Slave – John Ridley
  - Runner-up: Philomena – Steve Coogan and Jeff Pope
- Before Midnight – Julie Delpy, Ethan Hawke and Richard Linklater
- Captain Phillips – Billy Ray
- Short Term 12 – Destin Daniel Cretton
- The Spectacular Now – Scott Neustadter and Michael H. Weber

=== Best Visual Effects ===
- Gravity
  - Runner-up: The Hobbit: The Desolation of Smaug
- Iron Man 3
- Pacific Rim
- Star Trek Into Darkness
- Thor: The Dark World

=== Best Soundtrack ===
- Inside Llewyn Davis
  - Runner-up: Frozen
- American Hustle
- Despicable Me 2
- The Great Gatsby
- Muscle Shoals

=== Best Documentary Film ===
- Blackfish
  - Runner-up (tie): The Act of Killing and Stories We Tell
- 20 Feet from Stardom
- Muscle Shoals

=== Best Comedy ===
- Enough Said and The World's End (tie)
- The Heat
- Nebraska
- The Way, Way Back

=== Best Art-House or Festival Film ===
- Short Term 12
  - Runner-up (tie): Blue Is the Warmest Colour and Frances Ha
- Ain't Them Bodies Saints
- Before Midnight
- In a World...

== Multiple nominations and awards ==
These films had multiple nominations:

- 10 nominations: 12 Years a Slave
- 9 nominations: Nebraska
- 7 nominations: American Hustle, Gravity, and Her
- 3 nominations: Blue is the Warmest Color, Captain Phillips, The Great Gatsby, Inside Llewyn Davis, and Saving Mr. Banks
- 2 nominations: Before Midnight, Dallas Buyers Club, Despicable Me 2, Enough Said, Frozen, The Grandmaster, The Hobbit: The Desolation of Smaug, Philomena, and Short Term 12
