= National Board of Review Awards 2013 =

Annual US film awards ceremony

85th NBR Awards
Best Film: Her

The 85th National Board of Review Awards, honoring the best in film for 2013, were announced on December 4, 2013.

== Top 10 Films ==
Films listed alphabetically except top, which is ranked as Best Film of the Year:

Her

- 12 Years a Slave
- Fruitvale Station
- Gravity
- Inside Llewyn Davis
- Lone Survivor
- Nebraska
- Prisoners
- Saving Mr. Banks
- The Secret Life of Walter Mitty
- The Wolf of Wall Street

== Winners ==
Best Film:

- Her

Best Director:

- Spike Jonze – Her

Best Actor:

- Bruce Dern – Nebraska

Best Actress:

- Emma Thompson – Saving Mr. Banks

Best Supporting Actor:

- Will Forte – Nebraska

Best Supporting Actress:

- Octavia Spencer – Fruitvale Station

Best Original Screenplay:

- Joel and Ethan Coen – Inside Llewyn Davis

Best Adapted Screenplay:

- Terence Winter – The Wolf of Wall Street

Best Animated Feature:

- The Wind Rises

Best Foreign Language Film:

- The Past

Best Documentary:

- Stories We Tell

Best Ensemble:

- Prisoners

Breakthrough Actor:

- Michael B. Jordan – Fruitvale Station

Breakthrough Actress:

- Adèle Exarchopoulos – Blue Is the Warmest Colour

Best Directorial Debut:

- Ryan Coogler – Fruitvale Station

Creative Innovation in Filmmaking:

- Gravity

William K. Everson Film History Award:

- George Stevens Jr.

Spotlight Award:

- Career collaboration of Martin Scorsese and Leonardo DiCaprio

NBR Freedom of Expression:

- Wadjda

== Top Foreign Films ==
The Past

- Beyond the Hills
- Gloria
- The Grandmaster
- A Hijacking
- The Hunt

== Top Documentaries ==
Stories We Tell

- 20 Feet from Stardom
- The Act of Killing
- After Tiller
- Casting By
- The Square

== Top Independent Films ==
- Ain't Them Bodies Saints
- Dallas Buyers Club
- In a World...
- Mother of George
- Much Ado About Nothing
- Mud
- The Place Beyond the Pines
- Short Term 12
- Sightseers
- The Spectacular Now
