= Dallas–Fort Worth Film Critics Association Awards 2013 =

Annual US film awards ceremony

19th Dallas–Fort Worth Film Critics Association Awards
- Date: December 16, 2013
- Location: Dallas, Texas
- Country: United States
- Presented by: Dallas–Fort Worth Film Critics Association
- Website: https://dfwcritics.com/

The 19th Dallas–Fort Worth Film Critics Association Awards honoring the best in film for 2013 were announced on December 16, 2013. These awards "recognizing extraordinary accomplishment in film" are presented annually by the Dallas–Fort Worth Film Critics Association (DFWFCA), based in the Dallas–Fort Worth metroplex region of Texas. The organization, founded in 1990, includes 29 film critics for print, radio, television, and internet publications based in north Texas. The Dallas–Fort Worth Film Critics Association began presenting its annual awards list in 1993.

12 Years a Slave and Gravity were the DFWFCA's most awarded films of 2013, each taking three top honors. The former won Best Picture, Best Screenplay (John Ridley), and Best Supporting Actress (Lupita Nyong'o), while the latter won Best Director (Alfonso Cuarón), Best Cinematography (Emmanuel Lubezki), and Best Musical Score (Steven Price). The Best Picture win for 12 Years a Slave continued a trend of critics groups across the United States giving their top prizes to the film adaptation of the autobiography by Solomon Northup, a free negro who was kidnapped and sold into slavery.

Only one other film, Dallas Buyers Club, earned multiple 2013 honors from the DFWFCA. Set in mid-1980s Dallas, the drama received top honors for Best Actor (Matthew McConaughey) and Best Supporting Actor (Jared Leto). Cate Blanchett was named Best Actress for her title role in Blue Jasmine. The other films earning honors were France's Blue Is the Warmest Colour for Best Foreign Language Film, 20 Feet from Stardom as Best Documentary Film, and Frozen for Best Animated Film.

Along with the 12 "best of" category awards, the group also presented the Russell Smith Award to Fruitvale Station as the "best low-budget or cutting-edge independent film" of the year. The award is named in honor of late Dallas Morning News film critic Russell Smith.

== Winners ==
Winners are listed first and highlighted with boldface. Other films ranked by the annual poll are listed in order. While most categories saw 5 honorees named, categories ranged from as many as 10 (Best Film) to as few as 2 (Best Cinematography, Best Animated Film) plus the Best Musical Score category having only the winner announced.

=== Category awards ===
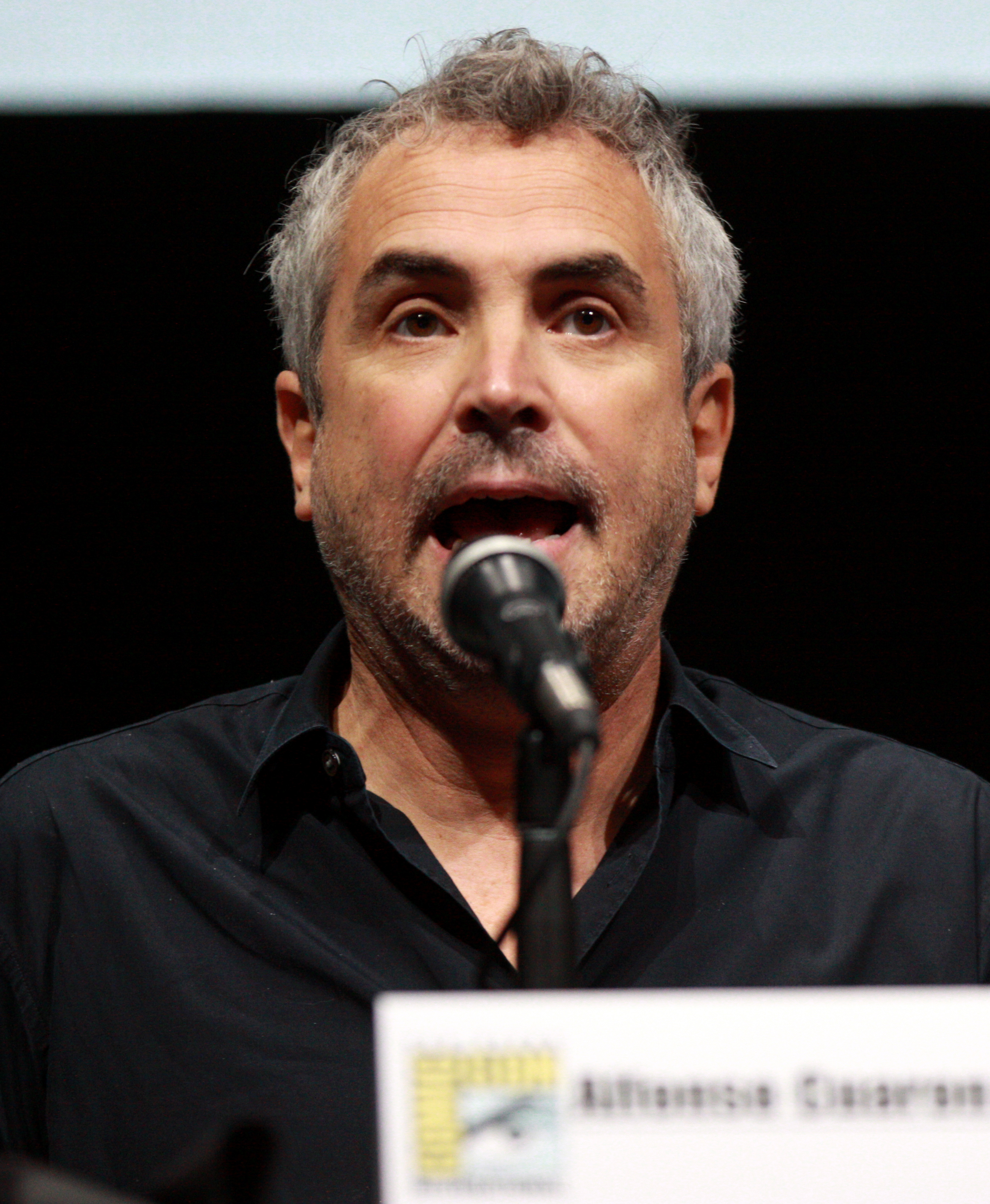
Alfonso Cuarón, Best Director winner

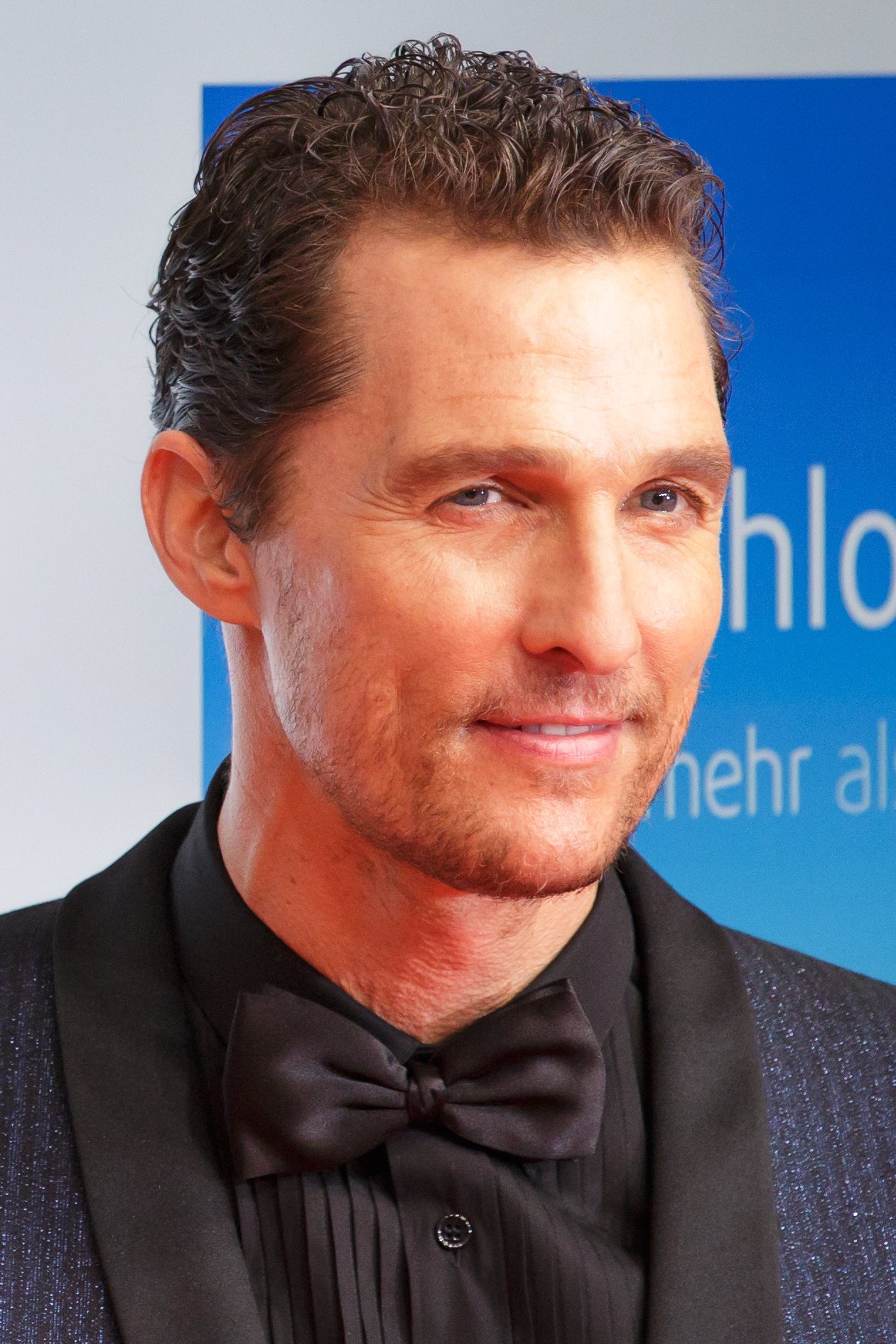
Matthew McConaughey, Best Actor winner

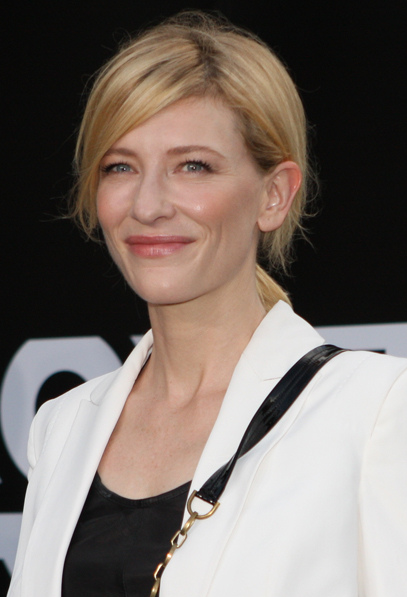
Cate Blanchett, Best Actress winner

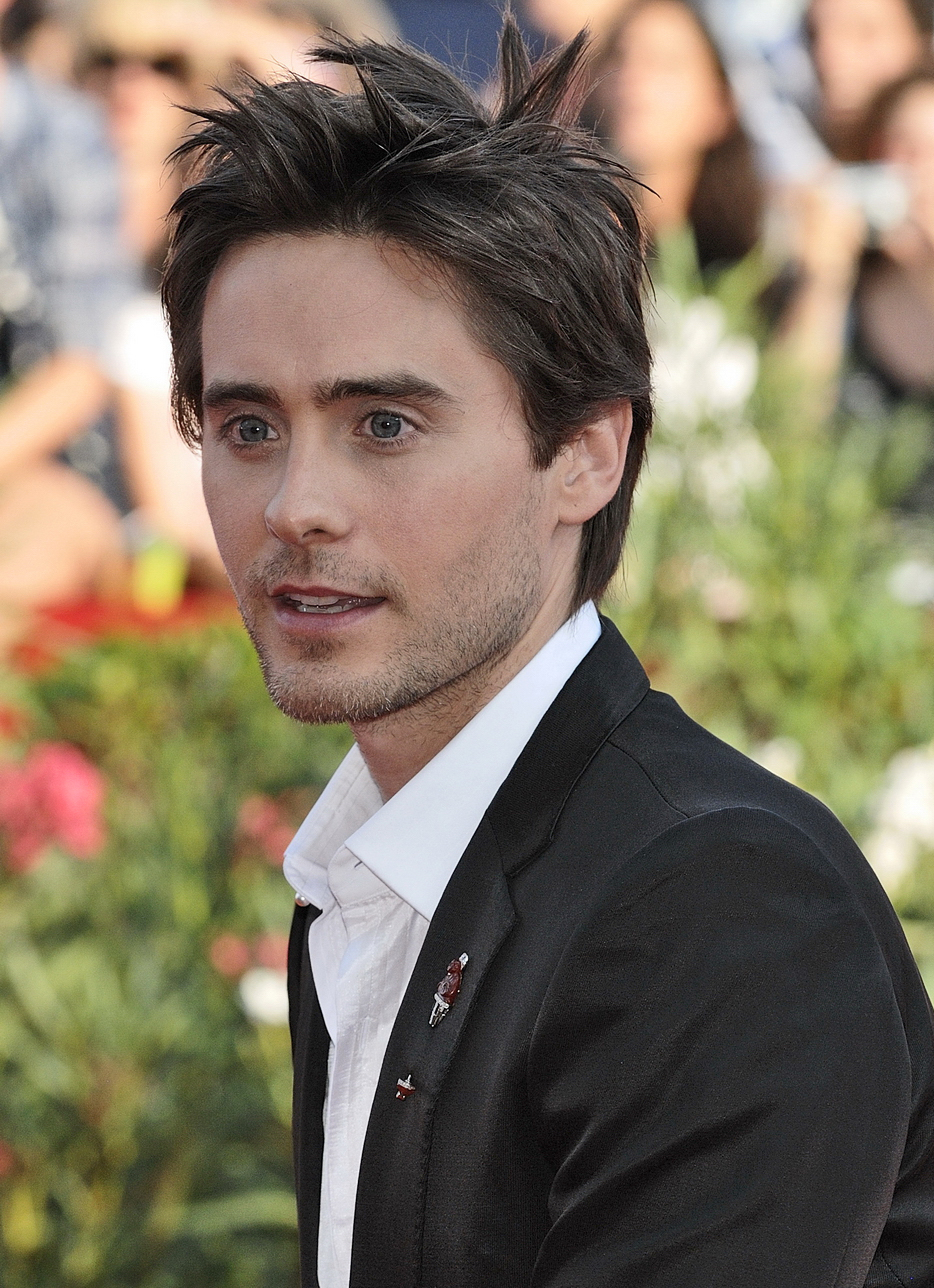
Jared Leto, Best Supporting Actor winner

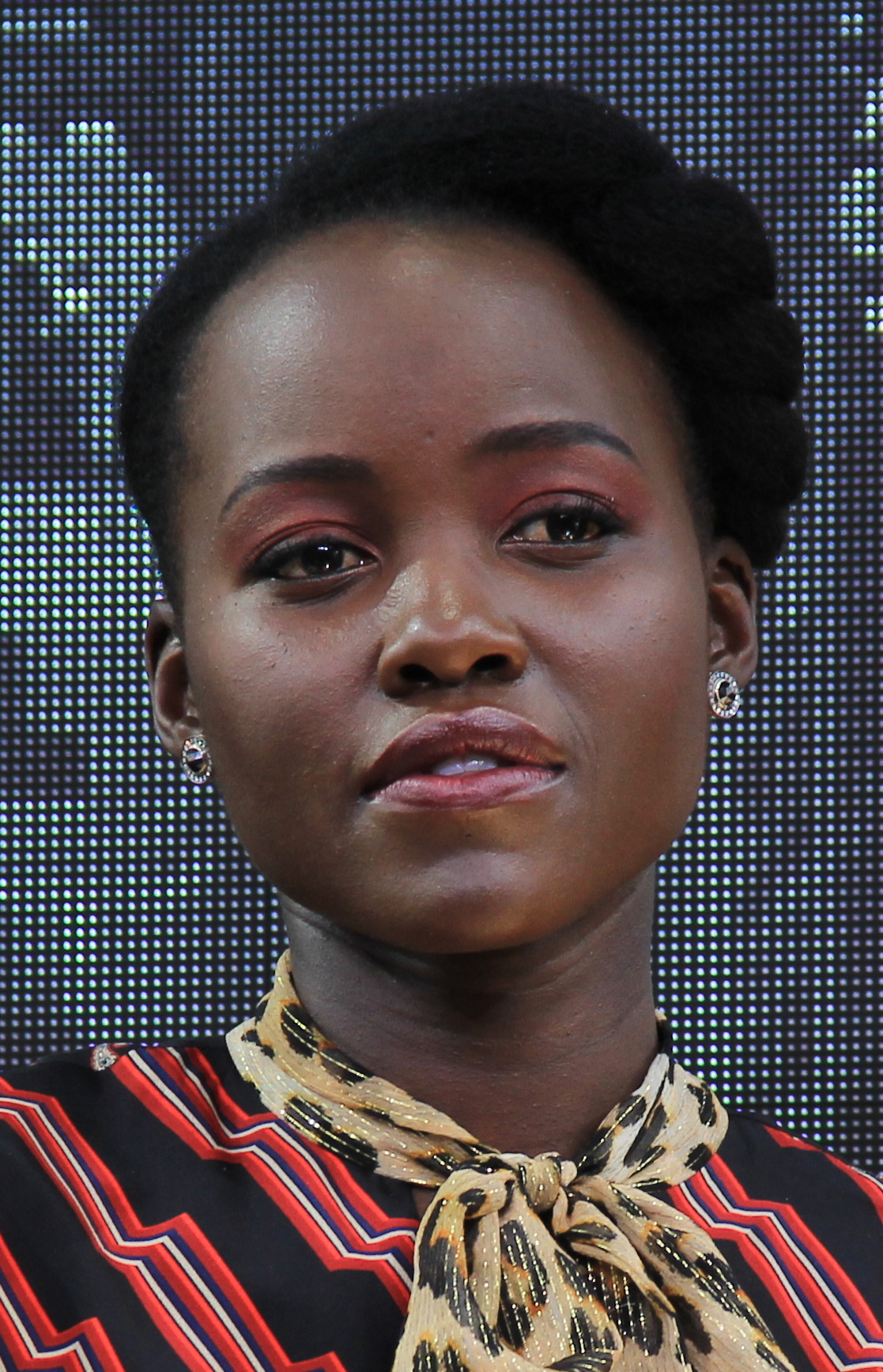
Lupita Nyong'o, Best Supporting Actress winner

Best Picture	Best Foreign Language Film
1. **12 Years a Slave**; 2. Gravity; 3. Nebraska; 4. American Hustle; 5. Dallas Buyers Club; 6. Her; 7. The Wolf of Wall Street; 8. Inside Llewyn Davis; 9. Captain Phillips; 10. Mud	1. **Blue Is the Warmest Colour** • France; 2. The Hunt • Denmark; 3. The Great Beauty • Italy; 4. The Wind Rises • Japan; 5. The Grandmaster • China
Best Actor	Best Actress
1. **Matthew McConaughey** - Dallas Buyers Club as Ron Woodroof; 2. Chiwetel Ejiofor - 12 Years a Slave as Solomon Northup; 3. Bruce Dern - Nebraska as Woody Grant; 4. Tom Hanks - Captain Phillips as Captain Richard Phillips; 5. Leonardo DiCaprio - The Wolf of Wall Street as Jordan Belfort	1. **Cate Blanchett** - Blue Jasmine as Jeanette "Jasmine" Francis; 2. Sandra Bullock - Gravity as Dr. Ryan Stone; 3. Judi Dench - Philomena as Philomena Lee; 4. Meryl Streep - August: Osage County as Violet Weston; 5. Emma Thompson - Saving Mr. Banks as Pamela "P. L." Travers
Best Supporting Actor	Best Supporting Actress
1. **Jared Leto** - Dallas Buyers Club as Rayon; 2. Michael Fassbender - 12 Years a Slave as Edwin Epps; 3. Barkhad Abdi - Captain Phillips as Abduwali Muse; 4. Daniel Brühl - Rush as Niki Lauda; 5. Jonah Hill - The Wolf of Wall Street as Donnie Azoff	1. **Lupita Nyong'o** - 12 Years a Slave as Patsey; 2. June Squibb - Nebraska as Kate Grant; 3. Jennifer Lawrence - American Hustle as Rosalyn Rosenfeld; 4. Julia Roberts - August: Osage County as Barbara Weston-Fordham; 5. Sally Hawkins - Blue Jasmine as Ginger
Best Director	Best Documentary Film
1. **Alfonso Cuarón** - Gravity; 2. Steve McQueen - 12 Years a Slave; 3. Alexander Payne - Nebraska; 4. David O. Russell - American Hustle; 5. Martin Scorsese - The Wolf of Wall Street	1. **20 Feet from Stardom**; 2. The Act of Killing; 3. Stories We Tell; 4. Blackfish; 5. The Gatekeepers
Best Animated Film	Best Cinematography
1. **Frozen**; 2. Despicable Me 2	1. **Emmanuel Lubezki** - Gravity; 2. Sean Bobbitt - 12 Years a Slave
Best Screenplay	Best Musical Score
1. **John Ridley** - 12 Years a Slave; 2. Bob Nelson - Nebraska **(TIE)** Spike Jonze - Her **(TIE)**	1. **Steven Price** - Gravity

=== Individual awards ===
==== Russell Smith Award ====
- Fruitvale Station, for "best low-budget or cutting-edge independent film"
