= Washington D.C. Area Film Critics Association Awards 2013 =

Annual US film awards ceremony

12th WAFCA Awards
- Date: December 8, 2013

Highlights
- Best Film: 12 Years a Slave
- Best Director: Alfonso Cuarón for Gravity
- Best Actor: Chiwetel Ejiofor
- Best Actress: Cate Blanchett

The 12th Washington D.C. Area Film Critics Association Awards were announced on December 8, 2013.

== Winners and nominees ==
Best Film

- 12 Years a Slave

- American Hustle
- Gravity
- Her
- Inside Llewyn Davis

Best Director

- Alfonso Cuarón – Gravity

- Spike Jonze – Her
- Baz Luhrmann – The Great Gatsby
- Steve McQueen – 12 Years a Slave
- Martin Scorsese – The Wolf of Wall Street

Best Actor

- Chiwetel Ejiofor – 12 Years a Slave

- Leonardo DiCaprio – The Wolf of Wall Street
- Matthew McConaughey – Dallas Buyers Club
- Joaquin Phoenix – Her
- Robert Redford – All Is Lost

Best Actress

- Cate Blanchett – Blue Jasmine

- Sandra Bullock – Gravity
- Judi Dench – Philomena
- Meryl Streep – August: Osage County
- Emma Thompson – Saving Mr. Banks

Best Supporting Actor

- Jared Leto – Dallas Buyers Club

- Daniel Brühl – Rush
- Michael Fassbender – 12 Years a Slave
- James Franco – Spring Breakers
- James Gandolfini – Enough Said

Best Supporting Actress

- Lupita Nyong'o – 12 Years a Slave

- Scarlett Johansson – Her
- Jennifer Lawrence – American Hustle
- Octavia Spencer – Fruitvale Station
- June Squibb – Nebraska

Best Adapted Screenplay

- 12 Years a Slave – John Ridley

- Before Midnight – Julie Delpy, Ethan Hawke, and Richard Linklater
- Captain Phillips – Billy Ray
- The Spectacular Now – Michael H. Weber and Scott Neustadter
- The Wolf of Wall Street – Terence Winter

Best Original Screenplay

- Her – Spike Jonze

- American Hustle – Eric Warren Singer and David O. Russell
- Blue Jasmine – Woody Allen
- Enough Said – Nicole Holofcener
- Inside Llewyn Davis – Joel Coen and Ethan Coen

Best Ensemble

- 12 Years a Slave

- American Hustle
- August: Osage County
- Prisoners
- The Way, Way Back

Best Animated Film

- Frozen

- Turbo
- Despicable Me 2
- Monsters University
- The Wind Rises

Best Documentary Film

- Blackfish

- 20 Feet from Stardom
- The Act of Killing
- Leviathan
- Stories We Tell

Best Foreign Language Film

- The Broken Circle Breakdown • Belgium

- Blue Is the Warmest Colour • France
- The Hunt • Denmark
- The Past • France/Iran
- Wadjda • Saudi Arabia/Germany

Best Art Direction

- The Great Gatsby

- 12 Years a Slave
- Gravity
- Her
- Inside Llewyn Davis

Best Cinematography

- Gravity

- 12 Years a Slave
- The Great Gatsby
- Her
- Inside Llewyn Davis

Best Editing

- Gravity

- 12 Years a Slave
- Her
- Rush
- The Wolf of Wall Street

Best Score

- 12 Years a Slave – Hans Zimmer

- Frozen – Christophe Beck
- Gravity – Steven Price
- Her – Arcade Fire
- Saving Mr. Banks – Thomas Newman

Best Youth Performance

- Tye Sheridan – Mud

- Asa Butterfield – Ender's Game
- Adèle Exarchopoulos – Blue Is the Warmest Colour
- Liam James – The Way Way Back
- Waad Mohammed – Wadjda

The Joe Barber Award for Best Portrayal of Washington, D.C.

- The Butler

- The East
- Olympus Has Fallen
- Philomena
- White House Down

== Multiple nominations and awards ==
These films had multiple nominations:

- 11 nominations: 12 Years a Slave
- 9 nominations: Her
- 7 nominations: Gravity
- 4 nominations: American Hustle, Inside Llewyn Davis, and The Wolf of Wall Street
- 3 nominations: The Great Gatsby
- 2 nominations: August: Osage County, Blue Jasmine, Blue Is the Warmest Colour, Dallas Buyers Club, Enough Said, Frozen, Philomena, Rush, Saving Mr. Banks, Wadjda, and The Way Way Back

The following films received multiple awards:

- 6 wins: 12 Years a Slave
- 3 wins: Gravity
