= 2013 New York Film Critics Circle Awards =

79th New York Film Critics Circle Awards

79th NYFCC Awards

January 6, 2014

Best Picture:
American Hustle

The 79th New York Film Critics Circle Awards, honoring the best in film for 2013, were announced on December 3, 2013 and presented on January 6, 2014.

== Winners ==
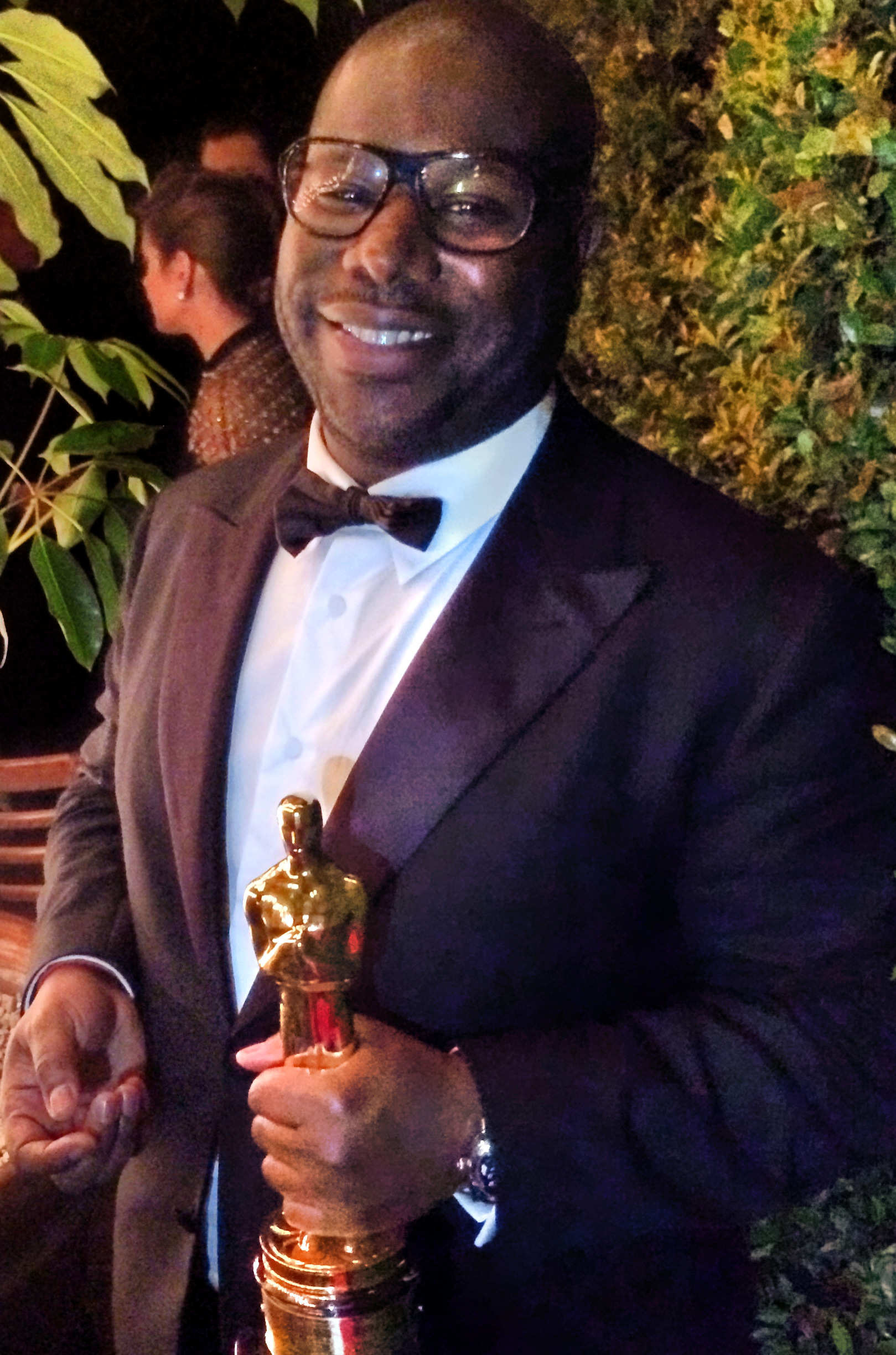
Steve McQueen, Best Director winner

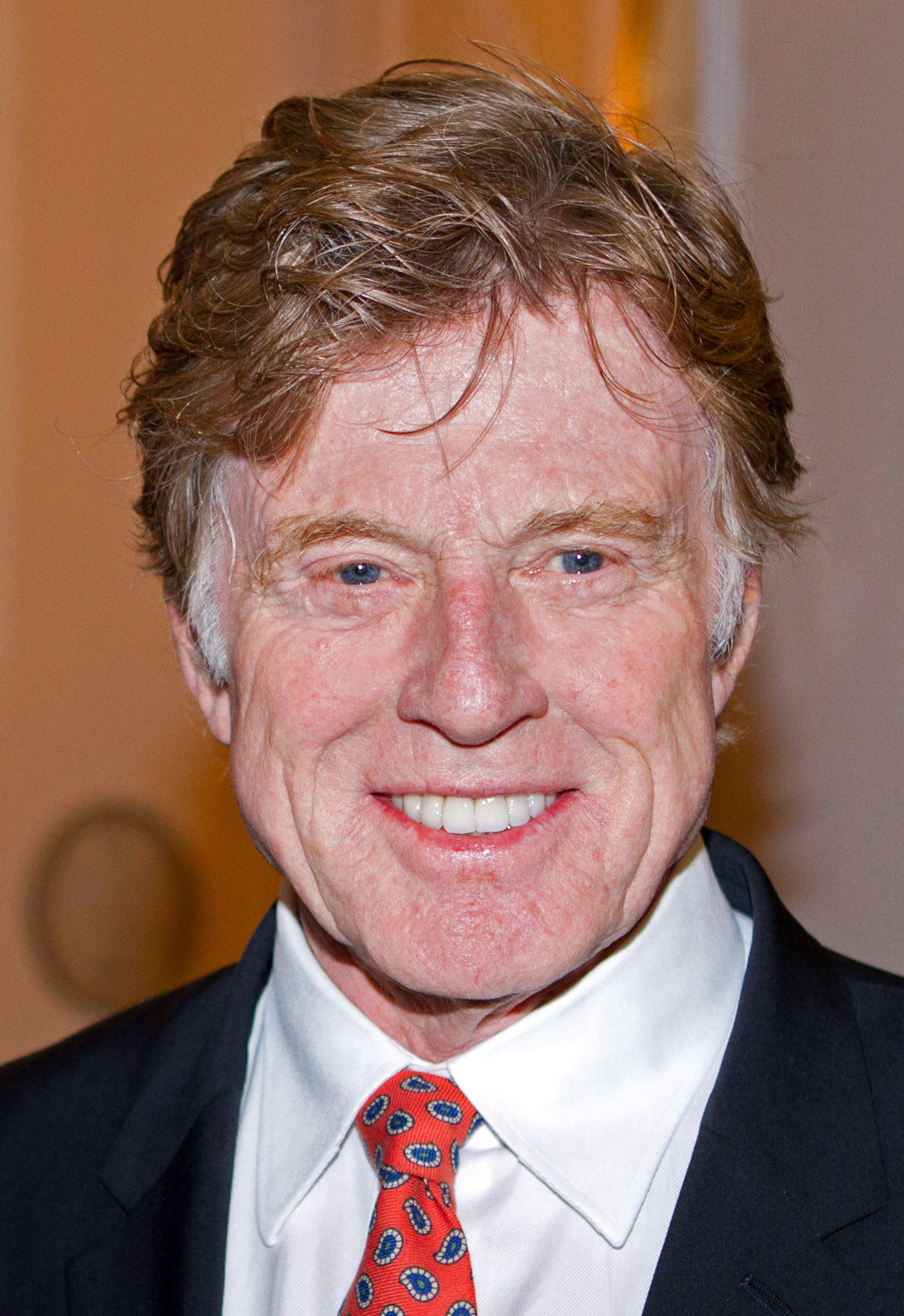
Robert Redford, Best Actor winner

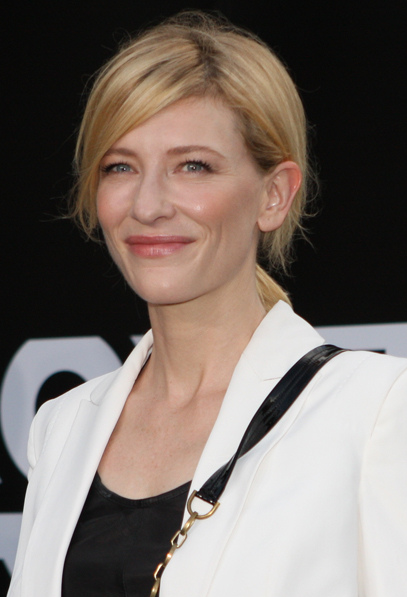
Cate Blanchett, Best Actress winner

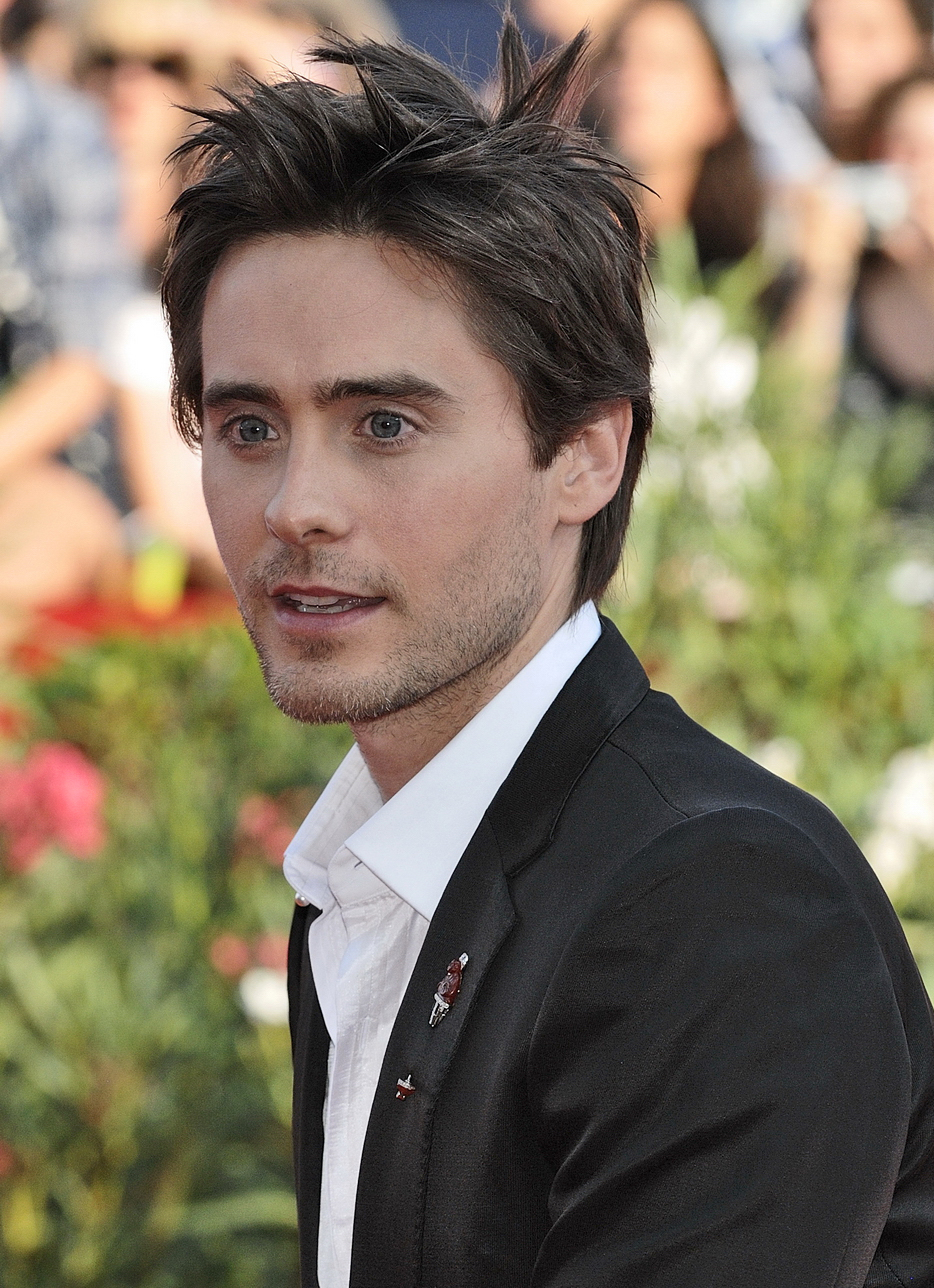
Jared Leto, Best Supporting Actor winner

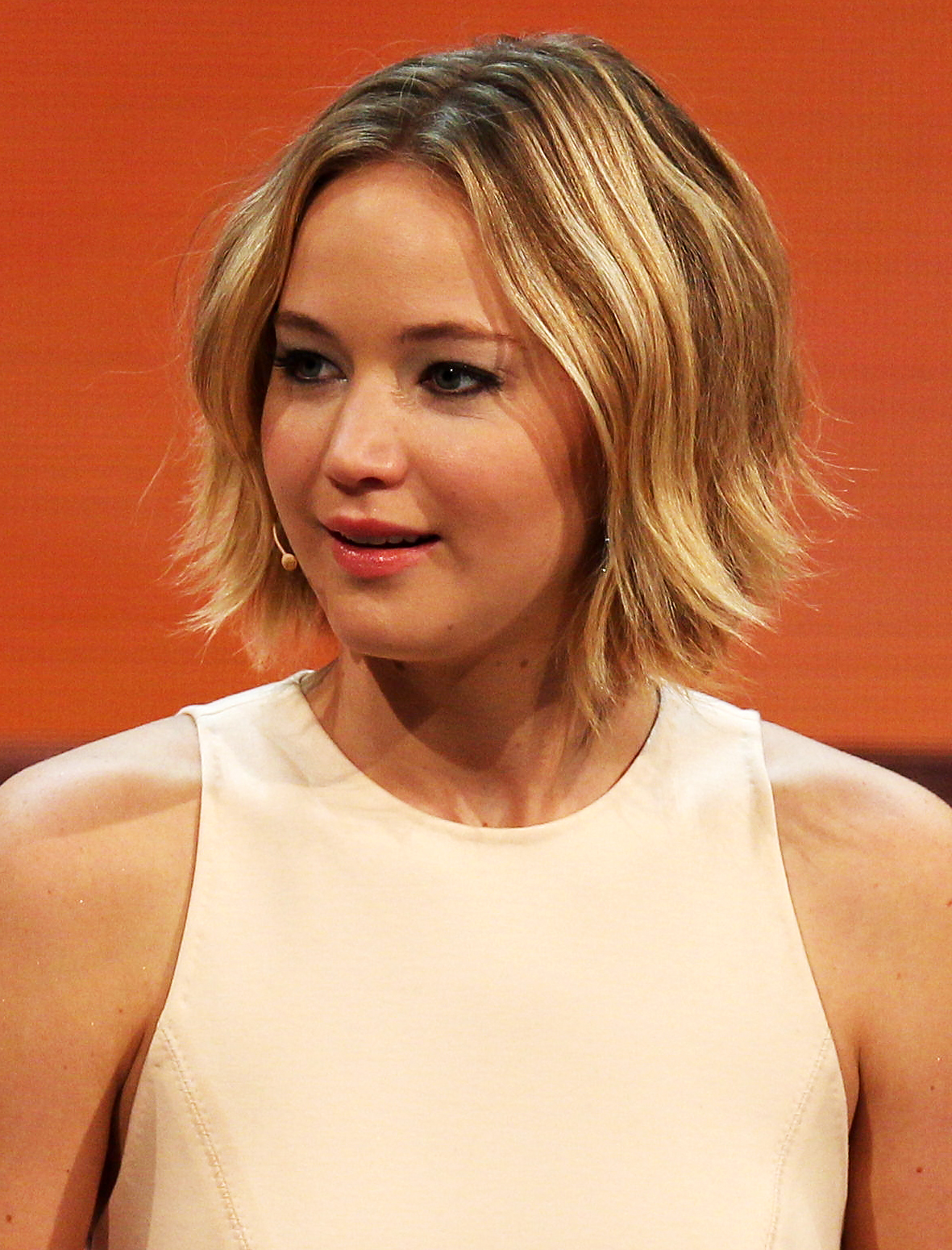
Jennifer Lawrence, Best Supporting Actress winner

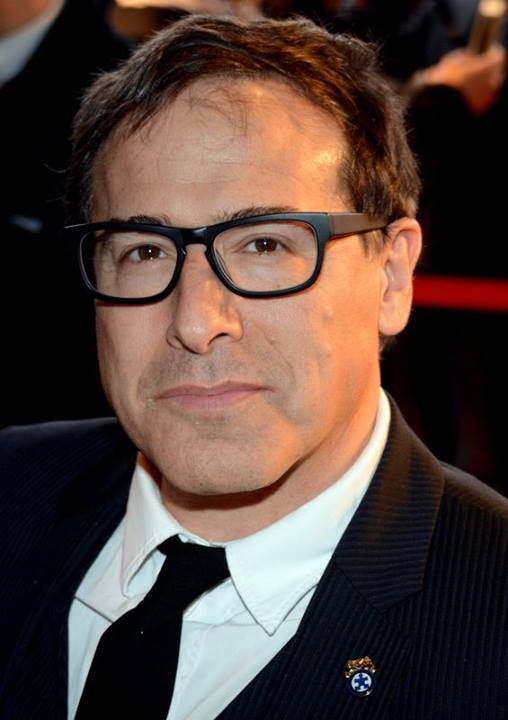
David O. Russell, Best Screenplay co-winner

- Best Film:
  - American Hustle
  - Runners-up: 12 Years a Slave (2), and Gravity and Her (3)
- Best Director:
  - Steve McQueen – 12 Years a Slave
  - Runners-up: David O. Russell – American Hustle (2) and Spike Jonze – Her (3)
- Best Actor:
  - Robert Redford – All Is Lost
  - Runners-up: Chiwetel Ejiofor – 12 Years a Slave (2) and Oscar Isaac – Inside Llewyn Davis (2)
- Best Actress:
  - Cate Blanchett – Blue Jasmine
  - Runners-up: Amy Adams – American Hustle (2) and Adèle Exarchopoulos – Blue Is the Warmest Colour (3)
- Best Supporting Actor:
  - Jared Leto – Dallas Buyers Club
  - Runners-up: Michael Fassbender – 12 Years a Slave (2) and James Franco – Spring Breakers (2)
- Best Supporting Actress:
  - Jennifer Lawrence – American Hustle
  - Runners-up: Lupita Nyong'o – 12 Years a Slave (2) and June Squibb – Nebraska (3)
- Best Screenplay:
  - Eric Warren Singer and David O. Russell – American Hustle
  - Runners-up: Richard Linklater, Julie Delpy, and Ethan Hawke – Before Midnight (2) and Spike Jonze – Her (3)
- Best Animated Film:
  - The Wind Rises
  - Runners-up: Frozen (2) and Monsters University (3)
- Best Cinematography:
  - Bruno Delbonnel – Inside Llewyn Davis
  - Runners-up: Emmanuel Lubezki – Gravity (2) and Phedon Papamichael – Nebraska (3)
- Best Non-Fiction Film:
  - Stories We Tell
  - Runners-up: The Act of Killing (2) and 20 Feet from Stardom (3)
- Best Foreign Language Film:
  - Blue Is the Warmest Colour • France
  - Runners-up: The Past (2) and The Great Beauty (3)
- Best First Film:
  - Ryan Coogler – Fruitvale Station
