= John Hargrove =

John Hargrove may refer to:

- John R. Hargrove Sr. (1923–1997), first African-American appointed assistant US Attorney for District of Maryland
- John Hargrove (orca trainer) (born 1973), American trainer of killer whales

== See also ==
- John Hardgrove (1836–1928), member of the Wisconsin State Assembly
- John Hargrave (disambiguation)
- John Hargreaves (disambiguation)
- Hargrove (surname)
