= Grey Stafford =

Animal trainer

- Born: New York, U.S.
- Occupation: Animal trainer
- Spouse: Karen Balogh Stafford

Grey Stafford is an American animal trainer, zoologist, and educator who is the Director of Conservation at the Wildlife World Zoo and Aquarium in Phoenix, Arizona. He is also a spokesperson for the zoo and aquarium industry.

Grey is the author of Zoomility: Keeper Tales of Training with Positive Reinforcement. His mentor, Jack Hanna, wrote the book's foreword.

== Early life and education ==
Grey was raised in Cleveland, Ohio and began his animal training career as a marine mammal trainer at SeaWorld of Ohio under the auspices of acclaimed animal trainers Thad Lacinak and Ted Turner.

He holds a PhD granted by the Department of Biological Sciences at Kent State University.

== Career ==
Grey works as the Director of Conservation at the Wildlife World Zoo and Aquarium in Phoenix and has appeared as a guest animal expert on "Fox 10 Arizona Morning," Good Morning Arizona and Your Life A to Z. He is a zoo spokesperson.

Stafford serves on the editorial advisory board for the International Marine Animal Trainers Association (IMATA).

Grey has been an expert commentator regarding captive animal issues for media outlets. On July 30, 2010, he was interviewed by CNN HLN concerning the fatal grizzly bear attacks in Montana. In 2013, he was selected along with his colleague William Hurley IV to serve as a guest panelist for a critique of the controversial docudrama Blackfish (film) for CNN.
