= Michael Bigg =

Canadian marine biologist

- Born: Michael Andrew Bigg; December 22, 1939; London, England
- Died: October 18, 1990 (aged 50); Duncan, British Columbia, Canada
- Citizenship: Canadian
- Education: University of British Columbia
- Known for: killer whale research
- Scientific career
- Fields: Cetology, marine biology
- Workplaces: Canadian Department of Fisheries and Oceans
- Doctoral advisor: Dean Fisher

Michael Andrew Bigg (December 22, 1939 – October 18, 1990) was a Canadian marine biologist who founded modern research on killer whales (orcas). With his colleagues, he developed new techniques for studying these apex predators off British Columbia and Washington, conducting the first population census of the animals anywhere in the world. Bigg's work in wildlife photo-identification enabled the study of individual killer whales over years and decades, including their travel patterns and their social relationships within their family groupings (pods), and so revolutionized the study of cetaceans.

== Early life ==
Michael Andrew Bigg was born in London in 1939. In the aftermath of World War II, his family emigrated to the west coast of Canada when he was eight years old. In his youth, Bigg enjoyed exploring the British Columbia wilderness. According to his father, newspaper publisher Andy Bigg, Michael's early life experiences ingrained in him an immense love of nature. Bigg attended Cowichan Senior Secondary School (now Quw'utsun Secondary School) in Duncan, and then the University of British Columbia in Vancouver, where he studied falcons, water shrews, and harbor seals. His PhD, awarded in 1972, was based on the reproductive ecology of harbor seals.

== Killer whale research ==
In recent decades, the public has come to appreciate and be fascinated by killer whales. However, before the mid-1960s, killer whales were widely feared as dangerous, savage predators, a reputation based on rumor and speculation. In the waters of the Pacific Northwest, the shooting of killer whales was accepted and even encouraged by local governments and moreover by other governments throughout the world. During the mid-'60s and early 1970s, a change in global opinion saw the development of public & scientific awareness of the species, starting with the first live-capture and display of a killer whale known as Moby Doll that had been harpooned off Saturna Island in 1964 and the impact of scientific research on this animal.

== Census ==
Between 1962 and 1973, at least 47 killer whales from the British Columbia and Washington coasts were captured for display in captivity, and at least 12 more whales died during capture attempts. It was assumed that the killer whale population in these waters numbered in the thousands; however, as a standard wildlife-management practice for "harvestable" animals, the Canadian government determined that a census should be done. In 1970, Bigg became head of marine mammal research at the Canadian Department of Fisheries and Oceans Pacific Biological Station in Nanaimo and was given the task of the census.

Bigg's first technique was to send 15,000 questionnaires to boaters, lighthouse keepers, fishermen, and others who frequented the British Columbia coast, asking them to record killer whale sightings in one day. No other animal census of this kind had been performed anywhere in the world. The results of the survey taken on July 27, 1971, indicated that the number of killer whales in the British Columbia region of the area was at most 350, drastically fewer than had been assumed. Similar surveys in the following two years and subsequent work with photo-identification techniques (described below), substantiated the results.

In 1976, Bigg submitted his report, indicating that the rate of captures from such a small population was unsustainable and recommending restrictions on the capture of killer whales from Canadian waters. The U.S. National Marine Fisheries Service conducted a killer whale survey in the Washington coast, which also yielded low numbers, and public opinion had begun to turn against whale capture. Since then, no killer whales in British Columbia or Washington waters have been taken for captivity, with the exception of Miracle, a young killer whale that had been discovered starving and with bullet wounds. Killer whales for aquarium display continued to be taken from Iceland until 1989, when that country banned further captures. Since that time, killer whale populations at marine parks have been in decline with only a few small-scale captures that have occurred in Argentina, Japan, and Russia.

== Photo-identification techniques ==
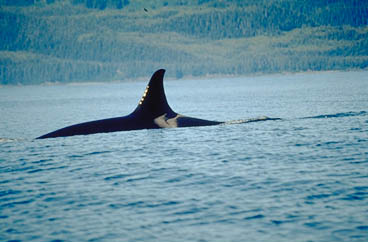
A female killer whale surfaces, showing its dorsal fin and saddle patch.

In the early 1970s, Bigg and his colleagues discovered that individual killer whales can be identified from a good photograph of the animal's dorsal fin and saddle patch taken when it surfaces. Variations such as nicks, scratches, and tears on the dorsal fin, and the pattern of white or grey in the saddle patch, are sufficient to distinguish killer whales from each other.

Although it had been recognized that some animals could be identified from obvious distinctive features such as scars, Bigg and his colleagues discovered that the dorsal fin and saddle patch area of every killer whale was sufficiently distinctive to allow the individual to be reliably identified at sea using photographic techniques. The technique enabled the local population of killer whales to be counted each year rather than estimated. It also allowed longitudinal study of individual whales, their travel patterns, and their social relationships in the wild, and revolutionized the study of cetaceans. Just a few years previously, whale research had meant studying captive or dead animals, and the study of living wild whales had been virtually nonexistent.

For killer whales, researchers arbitrarily chose the left side of the animal as the one to be used for identification. Bigg's team of killer whale photographers and spotters quickly grew to include hundreds of volunteers from along the coast, a project that was eventually formalized in 1999 as the B.C. Cetacean Sightings Network. In 1975, researchers examining thousands of black-and-white photographs began to assemble a catalog containing a photograph of every killer whale in British Columbia's waters, a catalog that has been continually updated and used to this day.

== Killer whale taxonomy and social structure ==
In 1976, federal funding for Michael Bigg's killer whale research ended, and he was reassigned to other projects. It was not until the early 1990s after Bigg had died, that the Department of Fisheries & Oceans again began to provide funding for whale research on the west coast. Still, Bigg continued his research on his own time for 14 years. Marine biologist Graeme Ellis who began working with Bigg in 1974, said that in the times that funding for killer whale research was absent, "it had become so fascinating we couldn't let it go - for many years it was done with our own money and our own time." In their book Guardians of the Whales, Bruce Obee and Graeme Ellis wrote:

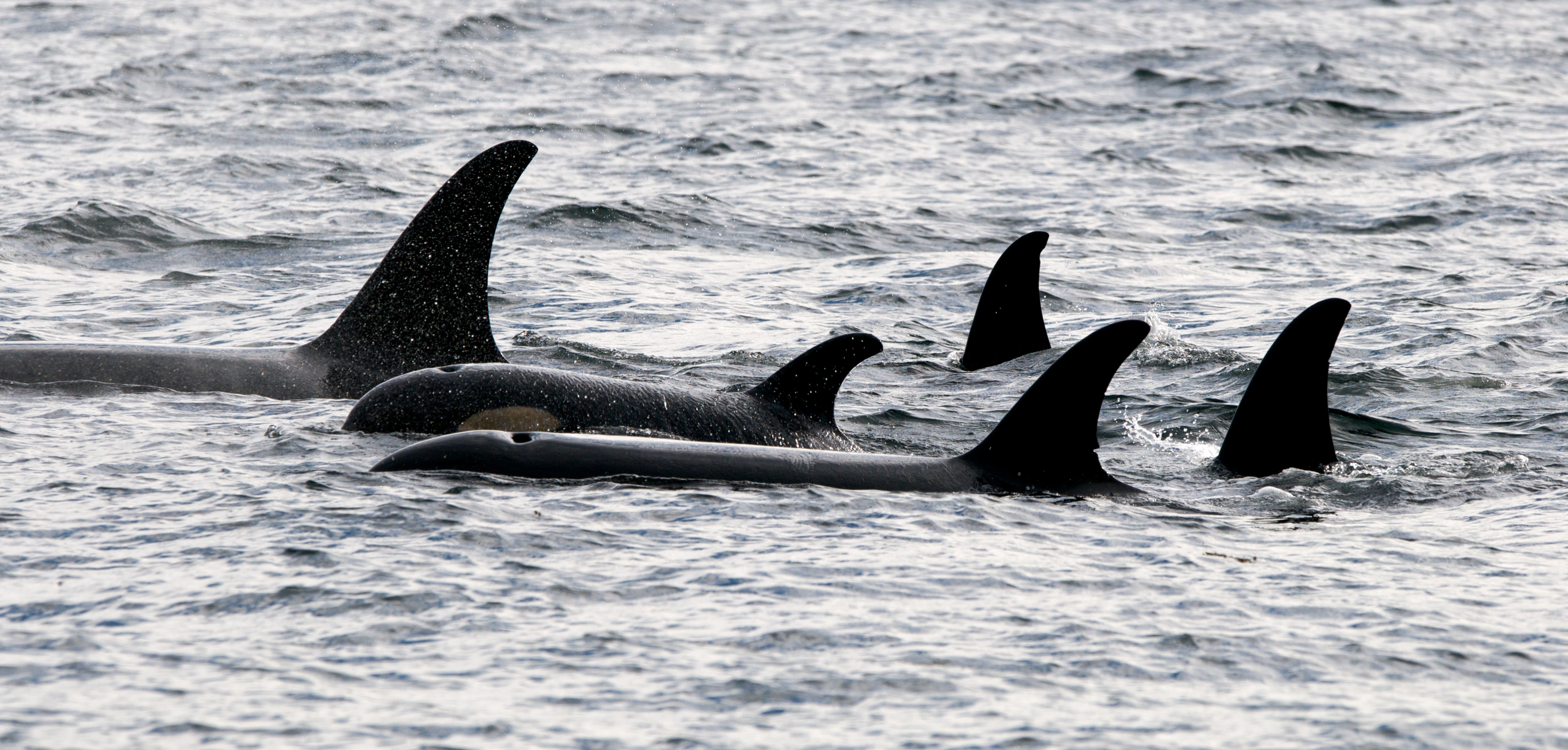
Bigg and his colleagues discovered that resident killer whales travel in extremely stable matrilineal groups.

"While studying seals, sea lions, or other species in the field he disregarded departmental memos ordering him to forget about whales... He traveled the coast on his own time, soliciting help from anyone and everyone with his infectious fervor. He'd think nothing of asking a float plane pilot to land beside a sport fisherman, then persuade the fisherman to run him over to a nearby pod of whales and click pictures for the rest of the day."

During this time, Bigg together with friends and associates, assembled what has been described as "one of the most thorough data sets for any wild mammal... the killer whale was transformed from one of the least known to among the best understood of all cetaceans." His records included births, deaths, diet, and social associations. Bigg and his colleagues gathered enough data to produce a complete family tree documenting the maternal-side relationships of every killer whale on the British Columbia and Washington coasts.

One of the key discoveries of Bigg's team was that there was divergence in sympatric pods of killer whales living near the British Columbia coastline between residents which ate almost exclusively fish, and transients which hunted marine mammals and other warm-blooded prey. The two ecotypes are "fundamentally different in most aspects of their behaviour, social organization, and ecology. These differences are so profound that the two forms are socially and genetically isolated, despite living in the same waters…Although the ranges overlap…they have never been seen to mix." The resident killer whale population of British Columbia and Washington is further divided into two communities, one northern and one southern, that do not interbreed. These discoveries were taken up by Hal Whitehead in his work on cetacean culture. As of 2024, these two types, residents and transients, are now considered two species, with the latter re-named after Bigg.

Another discovery was that resident killer whales have one of the most stable social structures of any animal species. Pods of killer whales had previously been assumed to consist of a few adult males and a harem of potential female mates. Bigg's team slowly realized that killer whale pods are matrilineal: killer whales travel not with their mates, but with their mothers and maternal relatives. The basis of resident killer whale groupings is the rule that each animal always travels with its mother for as long as she lives.

Although his research was based in the eastern North Pacific, Bigg mentored killer whale researchers from around the world, who sought his advice for their own studies.

== Other research ==
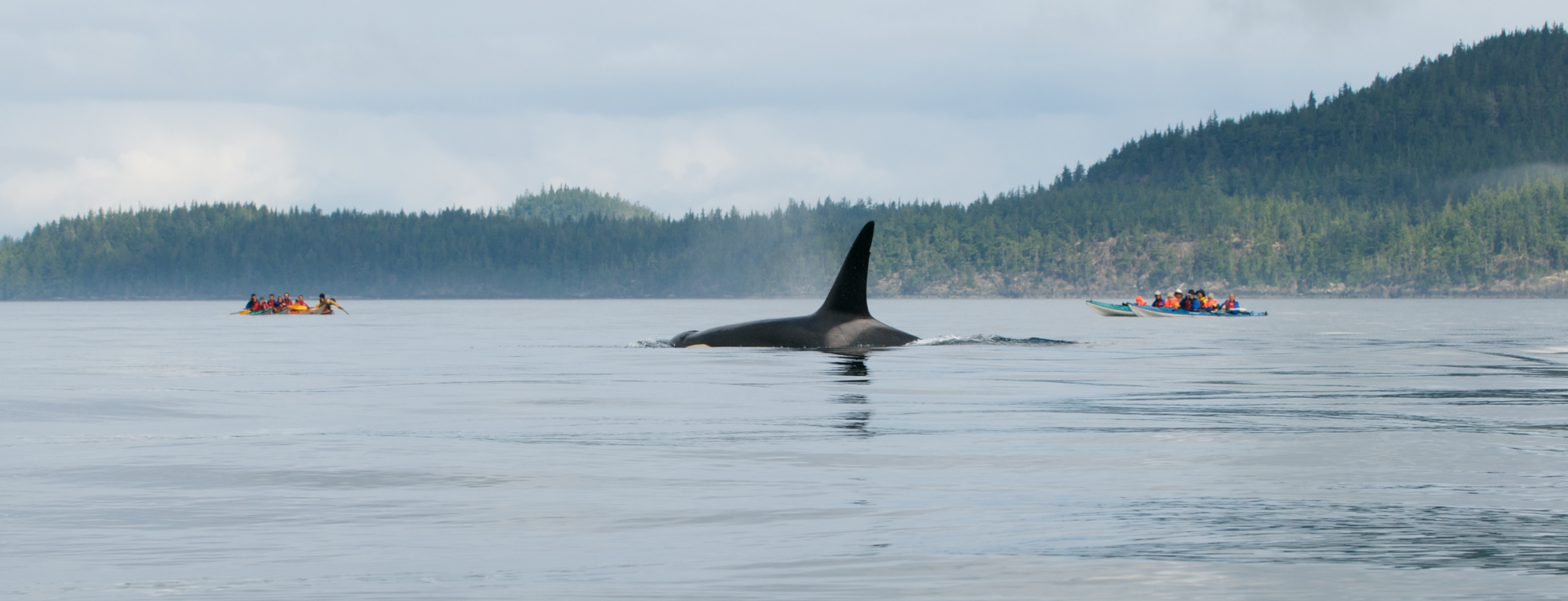
Johnstone Strait is the summer home to a large number of resident killer whales, and includes the Robson Bight/Michael Bigg Ecological Reserve.

Although he is best known for his work with killer whales, Bigg spent most of his career studying other marine mammals. He researched northern fur seals in British Columbia and the Pribilof Islands of Alaska. In 1972, Bigg organized a conservation translocation of Pacific sea otters from Alaska to Vancouver Island, a population that continues to thrive. He also conducted research on Steller sea lions, California sea lions, and harbor seals.

== Death ==
In 1984, Mike was diagnosed with leukemia. While ill, he continued to work to complete his final report on killer whales and was able to see it in print shortly before he died on October 18, 1990. He was 50 years old. Bigg was survived by a son Colin who died in 2009, his wife Silke, a daughter Michelle, two sisters Carol & Pamela, and his parents Andy who died in 2003 and Irene who died in 1993.

Bigg's ashes were scattered in Johnstone Strait. Attendees, and the press, noted that more than thirty killer whales appeared in the waters in time for the ceremony.

== Tributes ==
Aside from the species named after him, Bigg's killer whale, several other entities bear his name. The Robson Bight Ecological Reserve in Johnstone Strait, which was designated as a killer whale sanctuary in 1982, was renamed the Robson Bight/Michael Bigg Ecological Reserve. The reserve includes one of the few "rubbing beaches" in the world, where killer whales gather to rub against smooth underwater pebbles.

The "Dr. Michael Bigg Memorial Bursary" was created at the University of Victoria for students of marine biology. The Vancouver Aquarium created a scholarship program sponsored by the Wild Killer Whale Adoption Program. The "Michael A. Bigg Award" is presented annually to a graduate student whose thesis/dissertation research focuses on cetaceans toward the identification or conservation of cetacean habitat.

A female northern resident killer whale born shortly before Bigg's death in 1990, is unofficially named "M.B." (her official name is G-46). J26 was the first male southern resident orca to be born in 1991 after Bigg died. The day the newborn was first sighted, and after his sex was revealed, he was instantly given the name "Mike" by Bigg's longtime colleague Ken Balcomb of the Center for Whale Research on San Juan Island.

== Selected works ==
- Bigg, M.A. 1982. An assessment of Killer Whale (Orcinus orca) stocks off Vancouver Island, British Columbia, Rep. Int.Whal. Comm., 32: 655-666.
- Bigg, M.A., I.B. MacAskie, and G.M. Ellis. 1976. Abundance and movements of Killer Whales off eastern and southern Vancouver Island, with comments on management. Arctic Biol. Sta., Ste. Anne de Bellevue, Quebec. 20 pp.
- Bigg, M.A., G.M. Ellis, J.K.B. Ford and K.C. Balcomb. 1987. Killer Whales - a study of their identification, genealogy and natural history in British Columbia and Washington State. Phantom Press, Nanaimo, British Columbia
- Bigg, M.A., P.F. Olesiuk, G.M. Ellis, J.K.B. Ford and K.C. Balcomb. 1990. Social organization and genealogy of resident Killer Whales (Orcinus orca) in the coastal waters of British Columbia and Washington State. Report of the International Whaling Commission (Special Issue 12): 383-405.

== General references ==
- Colby, Jason M. (2018). Orca: how we came to know and love the ocean's greatest predator. Oxford University Press. ISBN 978-0-19-067311-6.
- Ford, John K.B.; Ellis, Graeme M.; Balcomb, Kenneth C. (2000). Killer Whales: the natural history and genealogy of Orcinus orca in British Columbia and Washington (2nd ed.). Vancouver, BC: UBC Press. ISBN 978-0-7748-0800-2.
- Hoyt, Erich (2013). Orca: the whale called killer (eBook ed.). Richmond Hill, Ontario: Firefly Books Ltd. ISBN 978-1-77088-067-2.
