= Carpenter fish =

The sound of "carpenter fish"
Actually a pair of sperm whales foraging.

"Carpenter fish" is a term that was used by US Navy sonar operators in the late 20th century to describe sperm whales, referring to the evocative, hammer-like patterns of "clicks" used to communicate and echolocate. As early as 1965, marine biologist and bioacoustics researcher William N. Tavolga referred to the fact that sperm whales clicks had been often called "'carpenter' sounds." A later naval technical report in 1980 notes that "sperm whale click trains are called "'carpenter fish' sounds by Navy sonar-men." A 2008 marine bio-acoustics textbook likewise notes this term as slang among Navy sonar operators for many years.

According to some authors, 19th-century whalers used this term as well, although there is little evidence that this was the case. Some authors state that whalers used the term to refer to sperm whales, while others write that it was used to refer to an anonymous, unknown species that produced such clicking sounds as heard through the hulls of wooden ships. It was common knowledge among American whalers and naturalists in the 19th century that sperm whales had ways of communicating danger across long distances. In his narrative of a whaling voyage from 1841, Francis Allyn Olmsted hypothesized that this alarm is sounded via a "flourish of [the whale's] flukes."

In his comprehensive account of the state of cetology in the 19th century, Richard J. King finds no evidence of the term's use. He writes, "although the term 'carpenter fish' is often written, I've yet to find any nineteenth-century evidence by or about whalemen that actually uses this phrase of even mentions sounds through the hull."
