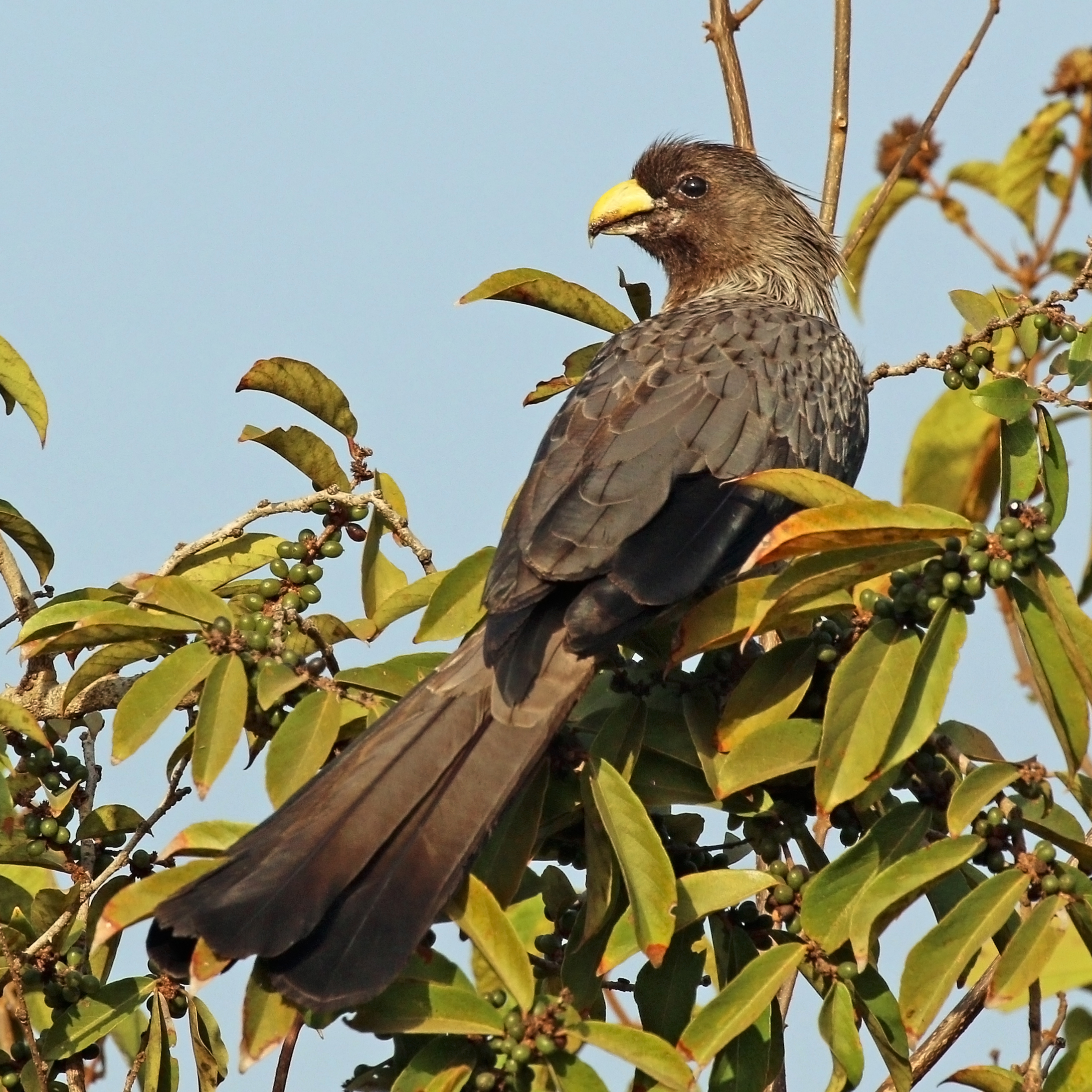
- In Gambia

Conservation status
- Least Concern (IUCN 3.1)

Scientific classification
- Kingdom: Animalia
- Phylum: Chordata
- Class: Aves
- Order: Musophagiformes
- Family: Musophagidae
- Genus: Crinifer
- Species: C. piscator

Binomial name
- Crinifer piscator (Boddaert, 1783)

= Western plantain-eater =

Species of bird

The western plantain-eater (Crinifer piscator), also known as the grey plantain-eater or western grey plantain-eater, is a large member of the turaco family, a group of large arboreal passerine-like birds restricted to Africa.

This species is a resident breeder in open woodland habitats in tropical west Africa. It lays two or three eggs in a tree platform nest.

These are common, noisy and conspicuous birds, despite lacking the brilliant colours of relatives such as the violet turaco. They are 50 cm long, including a long tail. Their plumage is mainly grey above spotted with brown. The head, erectile crest, neck and breast are brown streaked with silver. The underparts are whitish, heavily streaked with brown.

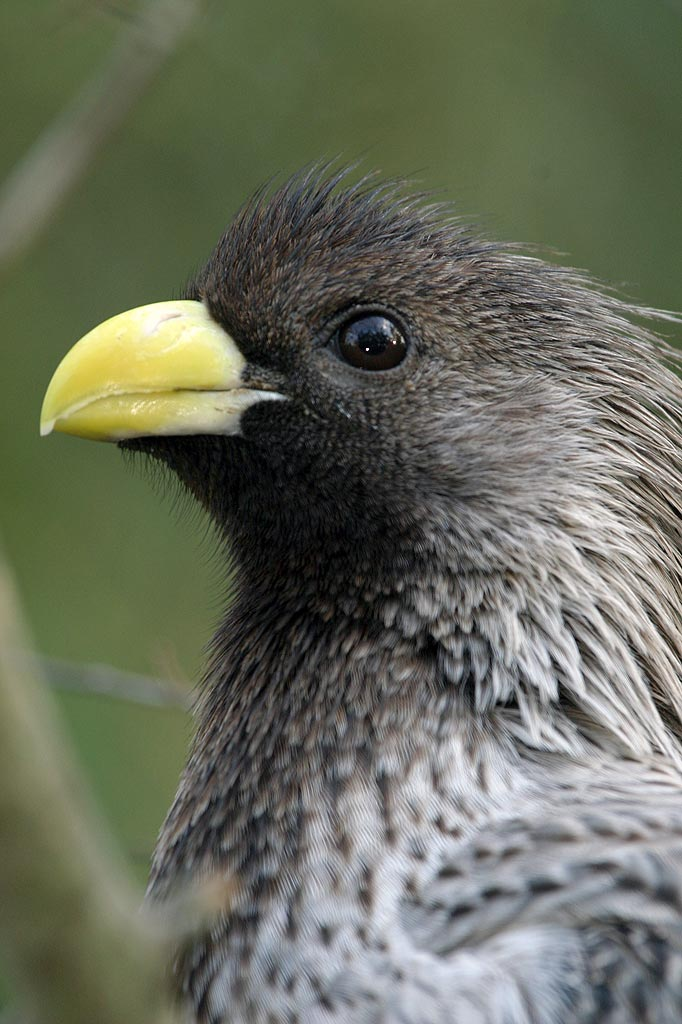
At Nashville Zoo

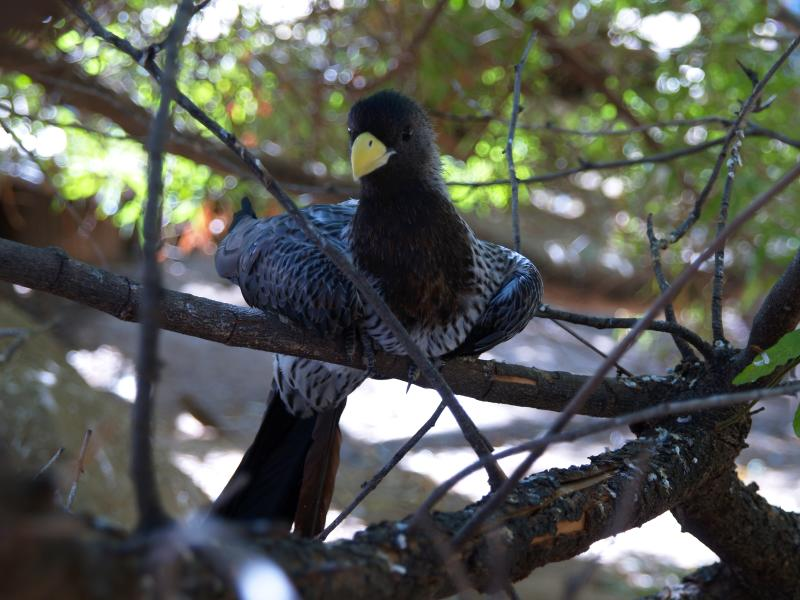
At Wildlife World Zoo, Arizona, USA

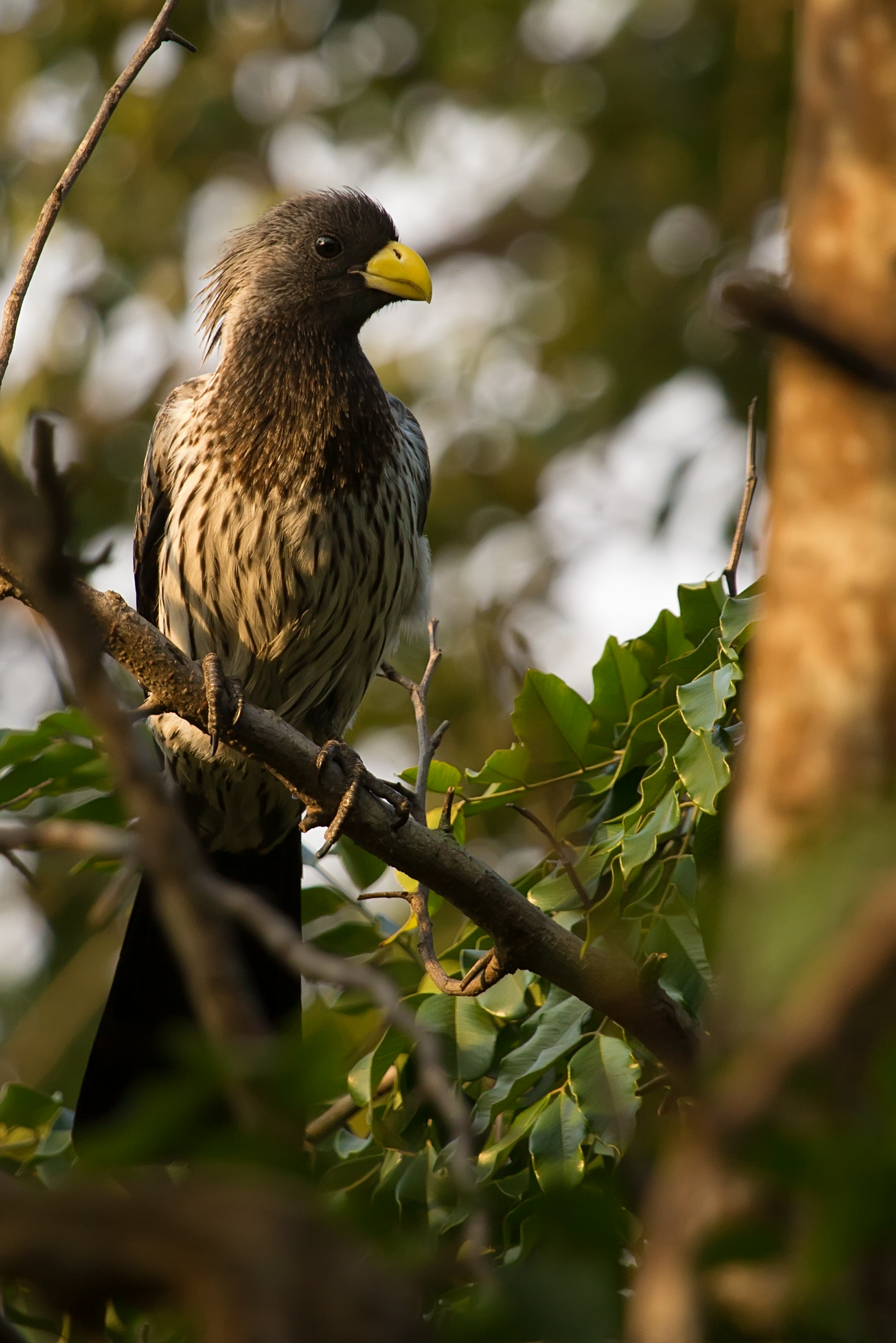
At University of Ghana, Accra, Ghana

The western plantain-eater has a thick bright yellow bill and shows a white wing bar in flight. The sexes are identical, but juveniles have a black woolly head without silver streaking.

This bird is similar to the closely related eastern plantain-eater. The latter species has white tail bars, and lacks the chest bars and dark wing feather shafts of its western relative.

This species feeds on fruit, especially figs, seeds and other vegetable matter.

The Western plantain-eater has a loud cow-cow-cow call, which is very familiar in west Africa.

== Taxonomy ==
The western plantain-eater was described by the French polymath Georges-Louis Leclerc, Comte de Buffon in 1770 in his Histoire Naturelle des Oiseaux from a specimen collected in Senegal. The bird was also illustrated in a hand-coloured plate engraved by François-Nicolas Martinet in the Planches Enluminées D'Histoire Naturelle which was produced under the supervision of Edme-Louis Daubenton to accompany Buffon's text. Neither the plate caption nor Buffon's description included a scientific name but in 1783 the Dutch naturalist Pieter Boddaert coined the binomial name Falco piscator in his catalogue of the Planches Enluminées. The western plantain-eater is now placed in the genus Crinifer that was erected by the Polish zoologist Feliks Paweł Jarocki in 1821. The generic name combines the Latin crinis meaning "hair" and -fer meaning "bearing". The specific name piscator is Latin for "fisherman.

The American ornithologist James L. Peters rejected the identification of Daubenton's plate with the western plantain-eater and instead used the specific epithet africanus that had been proposed by John Latham in 1790: "To recognize Daubenton's plate as representing Phasianus africanus Latham requires more imagination than I am capable of using." The plate may instead depict the African fish eagle.
