= John Hargrave (disambiguation) =

John Hargrave (1894–1982) was a British youth leader and politician.

John Hargrave may also refer to:

- John Hargrave (architect) (c. 1788–1833), Irish architect
- John Hargrave (judge) (1815–1885), Australian politician
- For the Internet humorist who styles himself as "Sir" John Hargrave, see Zug.com

== See also ==
- John Hargreaves (disambiguation)
- John Hargrove (disambiguation)
