= Wildlife photo-identification =

Animal tracking method

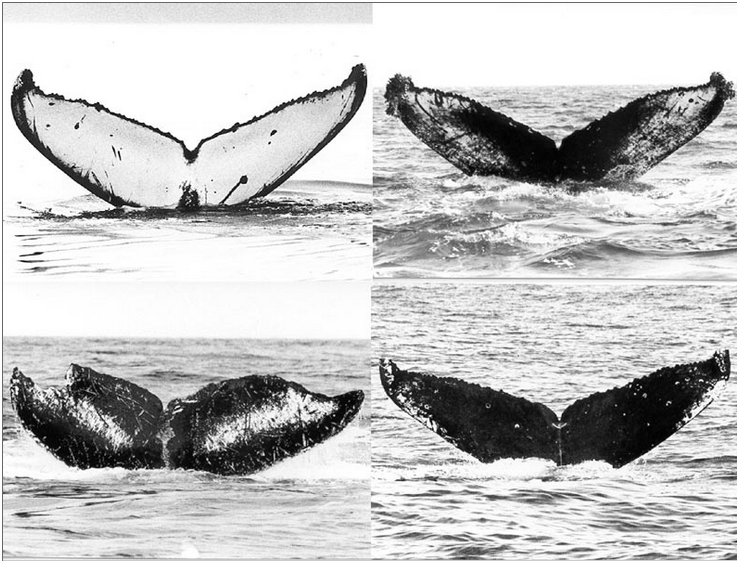
Researchers use variation on humpback whale flukes to identify and track the animals

Photo-identification is a technique used to identify and track individuals of a wild animal study population over time. It relies on capturing photographs of distinctive characteristics such as skin or pelage patterns or scars from the animal. In cetaceans, the dorsal fin area and tail flukes are commonly used.

Photo-identification is generally used as an alternative to other, invasive methods of tagging that require attaching a device to each individual. The technique enables precise counting, rather than rough estimation, of the number of animals in a population. It also allows researchers to perform longitudinal studies of individuals over many years, yielding data about the lifecycle, lifespan, migration patterns, and social relationships of the animals.

Species that are studied using photo-identification techniques include:

- Killer whales
- Humpback whales
- Whale sharks
- Manta rays - see Manta Matcher
- Octopuses (Wunderpus photogenicus)
- Salamanders
- Giraffes

== See also ==
- Michael Bigg, who pioneered the photo-identification of killer whales
