= Blackfish (film) =

2013 American documentary film

- Theatrical release poster
- Directed by: Gabriela Cowperthwaite
- Written by: Gabriela Cowperthwaite; Eli Despres; Tim Zimmermann
- Produced by: Manuel V. Oteyza; Gabriela Cowperthwaite
- Cinematography: Jonathan Ingalls; Christopher Towey
- Edited by: Eli Despres
- Music by: Jeff Beal
- Production company: Manny O. Productions
- Distributed by: Magnolia Pictures; CNN Films
- Release dates: January 19, 2013 (Sundance); July 19, 2013 (United States)
- Running time: 83 minutes
- Country: United States
- Language: English
- Budget: $1.5 million
- Box office: $2.3 million

Blackfish is a 2013 American documentary film directed by Gabriela Cowperthwaite. It concerns Tilikum, an orca held by SeaWorld and the controversy over captive orcas. The film premiered at the 2013 Sundance Film Festival on January 19, 2013, and was picked up by Magnolia Pictures and CNN Films for wider release. It was nominated for the BAFTA Award for Best Documentary.

== Synopsis ==
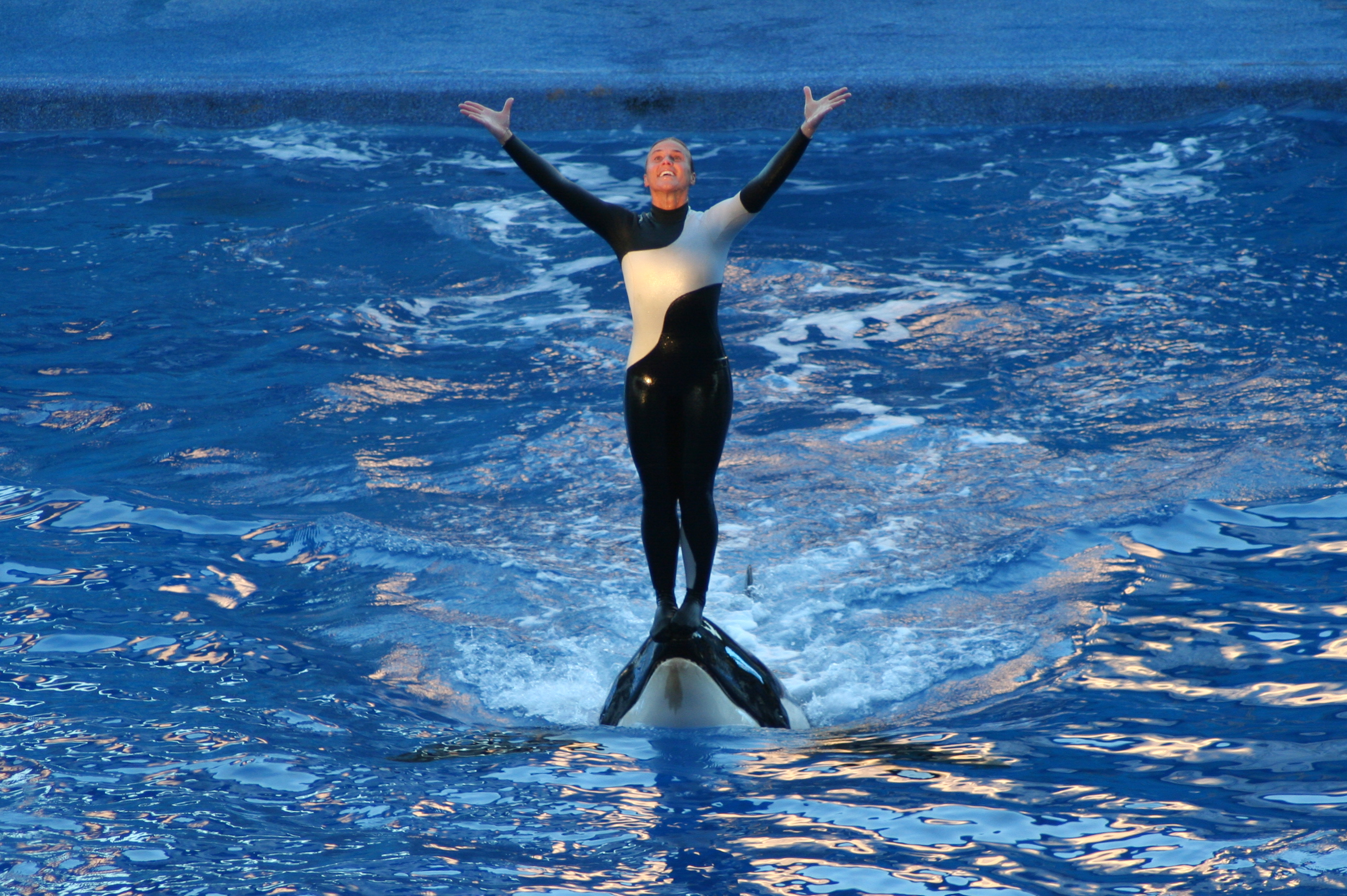
Dawn Brancheau at SeaWorld Orlando in 2006

The documentary concerns the captivity of Tilikum, an orca involved in the deaths of three people, and the consequences of keeping orcas in captivity. The coverage of Tilikum includes his capture in 1983 off the coast of Iceland and his purported harassment by fellow captive orcas at Sealand of the Pacific. Cowperthwaite argues these incidents contributed to the orca's aggression.

The film includes a testimonial from Lori Marino, director of science with the Nonhuman Rights Project. Cowperthwaite also focuses on SeaWorld's claims that lifespans of orcas in captivity are comparable to those in the wild, typically 30 years for males and 50 years for females, a claim the film argues is false. Other people interviewed include former SeaWorld trainers, such as John Hargrove, who describe their experiences with Tilikum and other captive orcas.

The documentary argues that the wild-caught orcas experienced extreme stress when captured as juveniles, and spending a lifetime in aquaria being forced to perform and breed led to aggression toward other orcas and humans. The film features footage of Tilikum's attacks on trainers and other captive orcas as well as interviews with witnesses.

== Development ==
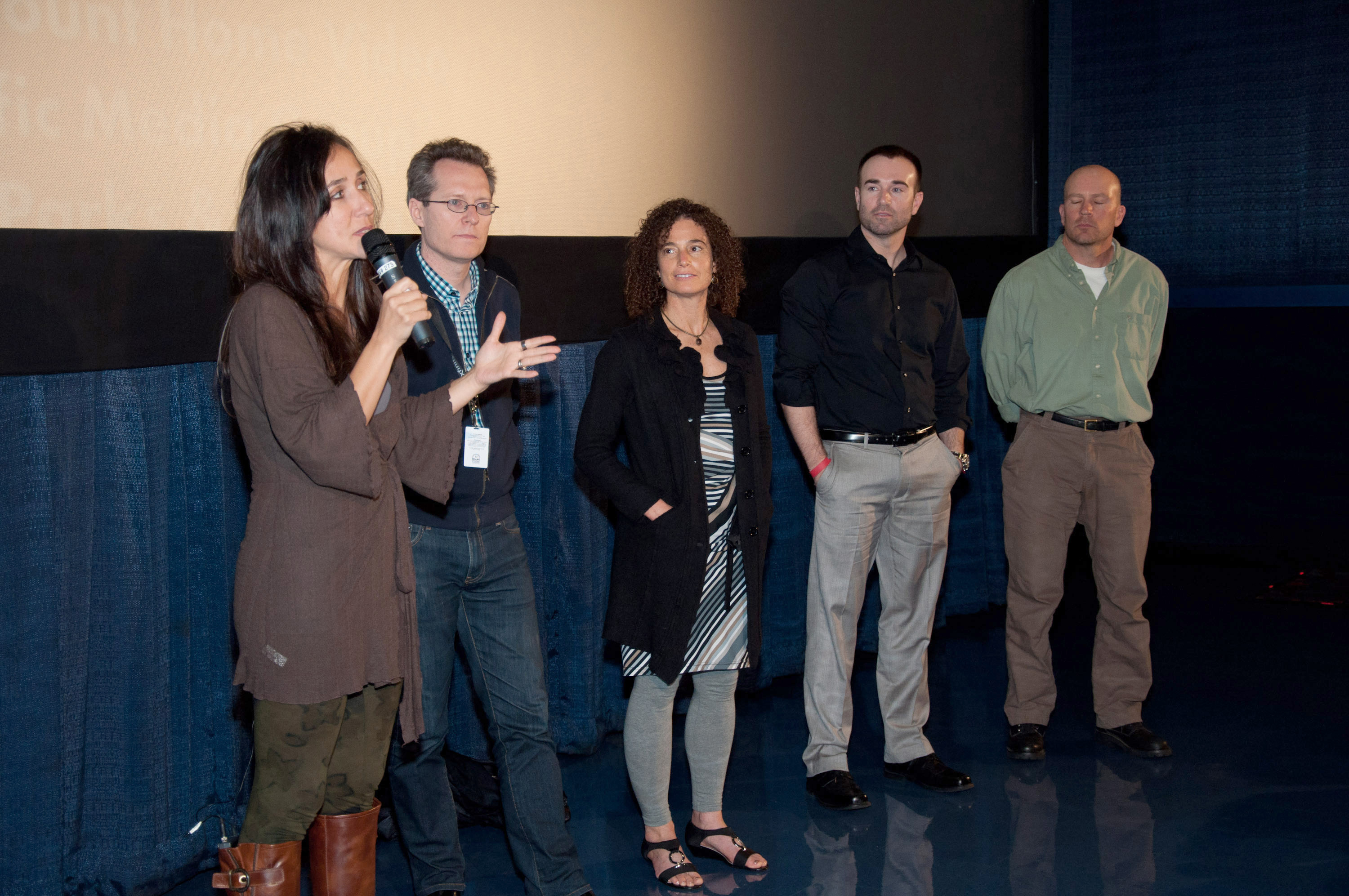
Director Gabriela Cowperthwaite, Thom Powers, former SeaWorld trainers Samantha Berg, John Hargrove, and John Jett at the Miami International Film Festival presentation of Blackfish at the Regal South Beach on March 3, 2013.

Cowperthwaite began work on the film after the February 2010 death of Tilikum's trainer Dawn Brancheau and in response to the claim that the orca had targeted Brancheau because she had worn her hair in a ponytail. Cowperthwaite argued that this claim had been conjecture and that "there had to be more to this story".

The film premiered at the 2013 Sundance Film Festival on January 19, 2013, and was picked up by Magnolia Pictures and CNN Films for wider release.

== Release ==
Blackfish premiered at the Sundance Film Festival on January 19, 2013. Shortly after, Magnolia Pictures and CNN Films acquired US distribution rights to the film, releasing the film on July 19, 2013, with Dogwoof Pictures acquiring international rights. Dogwoof sold the film to multiple buyers for international territories, including Netflix for streaming in the UK, Scandinavia and Latin America and Universal Pictures for Latin America, Scandinavia, Asia, Africa, Portugal, Italy, and Central and Eastern Europe. However, in 2021, for unexplained reasons, Netflix removed Blackfish from their platform.

== Reception ==
=== Critical response ===
On Rotten Tomatoes, a review aggregator, the film has a score of 98% based on 133 reviews with an average rating of 8/10. The site's critical consensus states, "Blackfish is an aggressive, impassioned documentary that will change the way you look at performance killer whales." On Metacritic, which assigns a weighted average score to reviews from mainstream critics, the film received an average score of 83 out of 100 based on 33 critics indicating "universal acclaim". The Deseret News called it "a gripping example of documentary filmmaking at its finest".

=== Box office ===
In release for 14 weeks, the film earned $2,073,582 at the North American domestic box office.

=== Response from trainers ===
Upon release, former SeaWorld trainer Bridgette Pirtle said the final film was "a complete '180' from what was originally presented to me." In earlier statements, Pirtle praised the film's direction and supported its message. Mark Simmons, one of Tilikum's first trainers, believed few of his interview comments were used "because the things I said flew in the face of the movie's clear agenda. What I contributed did not support Gabriela or Tim Zimmerman's intent with the film."

Michael Scarpuzzi, the vice president for zoological operations and trainer for SeaWorld San Diego, says the film uses Brancheau's death and gruesome details to "not inform the public, but, rather regrettably, because of the desire to sensationalize." He states, "We have altered how we care for, display and train these extraordinary animals. We have changed the facilities, equipment and procedures at our killer whale habitats. The care and educational presentation of these animals at SeaWorld has been made safer than ever. Does Blackfish inform its viewers of that fact? No, it does not."

In January 2014, the family of the late trainer Dawn Brancheau said neither they nor the foundation named after her were affiliated with the film and that they did not believe it accurately reflected Brancheau or her experiences.

=== Response from SeaWorld ===
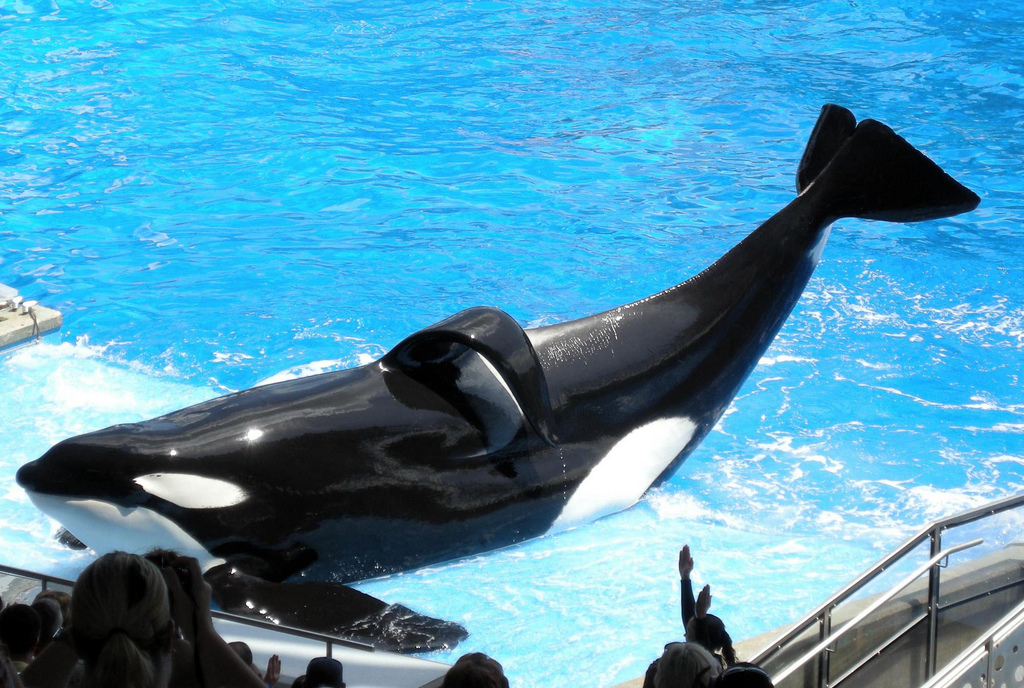
Tilikum at SeaWorld Orlando in 2009.

SeaWorld Entertainment refused to take part in the production of Blackfish, and later claimed the film was inaccurate, saying in a statement:

Blackfish ... is inaccurate and misleading and, regrettably, exploits a tragedy .... [T]he film paints a distorted picture that withholds ...key facts about SeaWorld—among them...that SeaWorld rescues, rehabilitates and returns to the wild hundreds of wild animals every year, and that SeaWorld commits millions of dollars annually to conservation and scientific research.

SeaWorld also responded with an open letter rebutting the claims. The Oceanic Preservation Society and The Orca Project, a non-profit organization focusing on orcas in captivity, responded with open letters criticizing SeaWorld's claims. Marine researcher Debbie Giles also offered rebuttals to SeaWorld, finding its assertions inaccurate. SeaWorld considers the film to be propaganda.

On December 31, 2013, the Orlando Business Journal posted a poll asking if Blackfish had changed readers' opinions on SeaWorld. The majority of votes stated that the film had not. It was later found that 180 out of 328 votes (55%) originated from a single SeaWorld-hosted IP address. SeaWorld defended the voting, stating that "each of the votes that came from a SeaWorld domain were cast by team members who are passionate about the incredible work SeaWorld does and the experiences our parks provide."

SeaWorld also created a section of its website titled "Truth About Blackfish", addressing the claims stated above and highlighting what it considered other problems with the film. This section of the website is no longer active.

On February 27, 2014, SeaWorld filed a complaint with the U.S. Department of Labor, claiming that Lara Padgett, the Occupational Safety and Health Administration investigator, had behaved unethically by aiding the filmmakers. Cowperthwaite denied claims of improper collaboration.

Starting in the summer of 2014, SeaWorld, as Eric Davis, created a number of public relations websites such as Awesome Ocean, Stand With Sea World, and I Love SeaWorld, in an effort to share their view, counter what they believed were inaccuracies happening in the public debate, and repair their brand.

=== Accolades ===
Group	Category	Recipient	Result
67th British Academy Film Awards	BAFTA Award for Best Documentary	Gabriela Cowperthwaite	Nominated
9th Golden Satellite Awards	Best Documentary Film	Magnolia Pictures	Won
2013 Sundance Film Festival	Grand Jury Prize Documentary (U.S.)	Gabriela Cowperthwaite	Nominated
San Francisco Film Critics Circle Awards 2013	Best Documentary Film		Nominated
19th Critics' Choice Awards	Best Documentary Feature		Nominated
Chicago Film Critics Association Awards 2013	Best Documentary		Nominated
Boston Society of Film Critics Awards 2013	Best Documentary Film		Nominated
American Cinema Editors Awards 2014	Best Edited Documentary – Feature	Eli B. Despres	Nominated
Chicago Film Critics Association Awards 2013	Best Documentary	Gabriela Cowperthwaite and Manuel V. Oteyza	Nominated
Dallas–Fort Worth Film Critics Association Awards 2013	Best Documentary Film		Nominated
Florida Film Critics Circle Awards 2013	Best Documentary Film		Nominated
Vancouver Film Critics Circle Awards 2003	Best Documentary	Gabriela Cowperthwaite	Nominated
Washington D.C. Area Film Critics Association Awards 2013	Best Documentary		Won
St. Louis Gateway Film Critics Association Awards 2013	Best Documentary Film		Won
Houston Film Critics Society Awards 2013	Best Documentary Feature		Nominated

== Impact ==
=== SeaWorld ===
SeaWorld announced afterward it had suffered a $15.9 million loss, which CEO Jim Atchison attributed in part to high ticket prices and poor weather.

Overall attendance at SeaWorld parks and Busch Gardens declined by 5% in the first nine months of 2013, though it was unclear if the drop in attendance was due to the influence of the film. SeaWorld claimed attendance figures for its three marine parks — Orlando, San Diego and San Antonio — in the last three months of 2013 were at record levels for that quarter.

In response to the film, New York State Senator Greg Ball proposed legislation in New York that bans keeping orcas in captivity. In March 2014, California State Assemblyman Richard Bloom introduced the Orca Welfare and Safety Act, a bill in California that would ban entertainment-driven orca captivity and retire all current whales. In June 2014, U.S. Congressmen Adam Schiff and Jared Huffman attached an amendment to the Agriculture Appropriations Act, requiring the USDA to update regulations under the Animal Welfare Act of 1966 in regards to cetacean captivity. It passed with "unanimous bipartisan support". The bill allocates 1 million USD to studying the impacts of captivity on marine mammals. Schiff cited Blackfish as raising public concern.

After the release of Blackfish, Southwest Airlines came under pressure to end its 26-year relationship with SeaWorld. Southwest responded that it was aware of concerns and was "engaged" with SeaWorld over them, but that the partnership would continue. In July 2014, it was announced that the partnership would not be renewed. A press release stated that the break was mutual and based on "shifting priorities". The petitioning by activists was cited as a possible factor for the split.

In August 2014, SeaWorld announced that attendance and revenue were down about 1% to 2% for the second quarter of 2014 compared with the second quarter of 2013. Additionally, SeaWorld stock prices dropped by 33%. The company attributed the decline to the proposed government legislation related to the documentary. In November 2014, SeaWorld announced that attendance at the parks had dropped 5.2% from the previous year and profits had fallen 28% over that quarter. As of November 2014, the company's stock was down 50% from the previous year.

In September 2014, the Rosen Law Firm PA announced an investigation into "potential securities claim" on behalf of SeaWorld investors. According to the firm, SeaWorld "acknowledged for the first time the negative publicity may have had a hit and may have been why the attendance has been flat for now and the past quarters." The firm will investigate if SeaWorld was aware of the impact and "chose to downplay that as a reason for its performance results." In September 2014, the Rosen Law Firm filed a class action lawsuit. It alleges that SeaWorld "misled investors by claiming the decrease in attendance at its parks was caused by Easter holiday and other factors" rather than the release of Blackfish and improper practices.

SeaWorld said in August 2014 that the film had hurt revenues at its park in San Diego. On December 11, 2014, SeaWorld announced that chief executive Jim Atchison would resign, with an interim successor replacing him on January 15, 2015. The company's share price had fallen 44% in 2014.

In August 2015, SeaWorld announced a 3% drop in revenue and an 84% drop in net income for the second quarter of 2015 when compared to the previous year. Attendance fell 1.6%, from 6.58 million to 6.48 million.

In November 2015, SeaWorld announced plans to end killer-whale shows at its theme park in San Diego. In March 2016, SeaWorld announced it would end its orca breeding program and begin to phase out all live performances using orcas. In a statement regarding the decision, the company said, "Society is changing and we're changing with it."

In 2018, SeaWorld and former CEO James Atchison agreed to pay over $5 million to settle federal charges that the company hid from investors the negative impact that Blackfish had on the business. As part of the indictment, according to the Securities and Exchange Commission, Atchison sold Seaworld stock in the first quarter of 2014 in order to hide the loss in revenue.

=== Other media ===
Reaction to the documentary prompted multiple performers to cancel their scheduled concerts at the "Bands, Brew & BBQ" event at SeaWorld Orlando and Busch Gardens Tampa in 2014. These musician included Heart, Barenaked Ladies, Willie Nelson, Martina McBride, .38 Special, Cheap Trick, REO Speedwagon, Pat Benatar, The Beach Boys, Trace Adkins, and Trisha Yearwood.

The ending to the Disney/Pixar film Finding Dory was revised after director Andrew Stanton and then-chief creative officer John Lasseter saw Blackfish and spoke with director Gabriela Cowperthwaite. The depiction of a marine park in the film was altered based on these conversations.

The film Paper Towns, based on the book by John Green, had scenes featuring SeaWorld cut. Producer Wyck Godfrey explained, "Since [John] wrote the book, the documentary [Blackfish] came out. I think it's a little less playful to go to SeaWorld now."

Director Colin Trevorrow said the animal rights themes in the 2015 film Jurassic World were inspired by Blackfish, with elements of the hybrid dinosaur Indominus rex and the fictional theme park in the film inspired by Tilikum and SeaWorld, respectively.

== Soundtrack ==
Composer Jeff Beal composed the original score, recording a small orchestra at his house in Agoura Hills. While no physical CDs were produced, the score is available for download on iTunes. In July 2016, the Hollywood Chamber Orchestra premiered the concert version of the score, live-to-picture, at the Montalban Theater, conducted by Beal.

== Home media ==
Blackfish was released on DVD and Blu-ray on August 26, 2013, in the UK (Region 2, PAL). Its U.S. release was on November 12, 2013.

The documentary was broadcast on CNN on October 24, 2013. After the broadcast, CNN aired an Anderson Cooper special with Jack Hanna, Gabriela Cowperthwaite, Naomi Rose and Jack Hurley. This was followed by a special edition of Crossfire with Blackfish associate producer Tim Zimmermann debating Grey Stafford, a conservationist, zoologist, and member of the International Marine Animal Trainers Association.

The documentary aired on BBC Four in the UK on November 21, 2013, as part of the Storyville documentary series.

== See also ==
- Animal attacks
- Killer whale attacks on humans
- Incidents at SeaWorld parks
- Non-human animal personhood
- Nonhuman Rights Project
- The Walrus and the Whistleblower
- The Whale (2011 film)
- Orca (film)
- Who Killed Miracle?
