= John Hargrove (orca trainer) =

American killer whale trainer

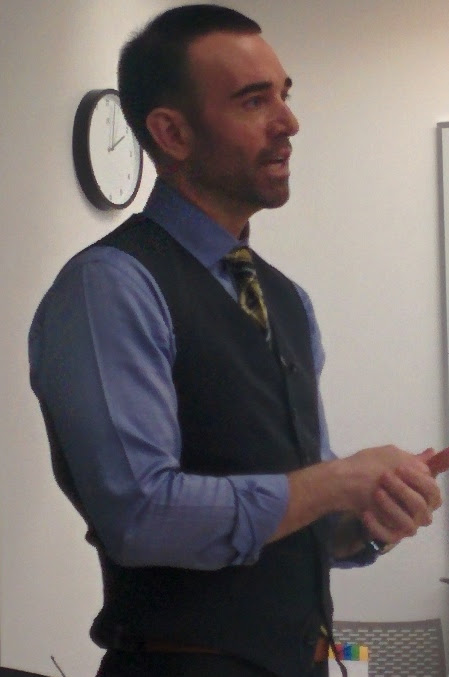
- Occupation: (former) SeaWorld Trainer

John Hargrove is a former senior killer whale trainer for SeaWorld and supervisor of killer whale training at Marineland of Antibes in France. Hargrove appeared in the 2013 documentary Blackfish, wrote a book about his experiences in Beneath The Surface, and has campaigned in support of legislation in California and New York to end the practice of keeping killer whales in captivity.

== Career ==
John Hargrove grew up in Orange, Texas. At a young age, he saw his first Shamu killer whale show at SeaWorld Orlando, and envisioned a career as a killer whale trainer. In 1993, when Hargrove was age 20 and attending the University of Houston, he was hired as an apprentice trainer at SeaWorld San Antonio. In 1995 Hargrove was transferred to SeaWorld San Diego in California where he worked until 2001. He was ultimately promoted to a Senior Trainer at Shamu Stadium. Immediately after resigning from SeaWorld California, Hargrove was hired by Marineland of Antibes in France until 2003. He then left the industry until March 2008, when he returned to SeaWorld in San Antonio where he was promoted to a Senior 1 trainer at Shamu Stadium. He worked there until resigning in August 2012.

As of 2015, Hargrove resides in New York City.

== Advocacy and Blackfish ==
Seven days after resigning from SeaWorld, Hargrove was interviewed for the documentary Blackfish. In the film, he spoke about his career training killer whales and his belief that these whales are not suitable for captivity.

After promoting Blackfish, Hargrove was asked to co-sponsor the Orca Welfare and Safety Act proposed by Democrat Assemblymen Richard Bloom. Hargrove testified on April 8, 2014, before the California State Assembly. In May 2014, Hargrove was invited by New York State Senator Greg Ball and Assemblyman James Tedisco to Albany to speak at the fourth annual New York State Animal Advocacy Day.

== Beneath The Surface ==
Hargrove is the author of a memoir, Beneath The Surface, published by Palgrave Macmillan in 2015. Howard G. Chua-Eoan co-authored the book, which covers Hargrove's experiences with orca at SeaWorld and in nature. It reached #18 on The New York Times nonfiction hardcover best-seller list.

SeaWorld increased its criticism of Hargrove after the book was published, saying Hargrove quit after being disciplined for a severe safety violation while at SeaWorld. SeaWorld also forwarded to reporters a five-year-old cell phone video of an intoxicated Hargrove using the racist slur "nigger". Hargrove accused SeaWorld of conducting a "smear campaign" against him to distract from the issue of killer whales in captivity. He later apologized for the language in the video. Hargrove said the "severe safety violation" was only a delay in notifying supervisors after he corrected another employee's error, and that his leaving SeaWorld was unrelated to it. On November 9, 2015 PETA presented Hargrove its Courage of Conviction Award for revealing SeaWorld's treatment of captive orcas. Days later, Hargrove's memoir was optioned for film by producers Michael K. Snyder and Rachel K. Stotts through Crash Films.
