= Hargrove =

Hargrove is a surname which may refer to:

== People ==
- Anthony Hargrove (born 1983), American football player
- Brian Hargrove (born 1956), American television writer and producer
- Buzz Hargrove (1944–2025), Canadian labour leader, president of the Canadian Auto Workers trade union
- Dean Hargrove (born 1938), American television producer, writer, and director
- Dennis Hargrove Cooke (1904–1982), fourth president of what is now East Carolina University
- Ed Hargrove, American football player and coach
- Frank Hargrove (1927–2021), American politician
- Greg Hargrove (born 1959), Canadian politician
- Jim Hargrove, Washington state senator
- James Hargrove Meredith (1914–1988), United States federal judge
- Jimmy Hargrove, American football player
- John R. Hargrove, Sr. (1923–1997), first African American to be appointed assistant United States Attorney for the District of Maryland
- Linda Hargrove (1949–2010), American country songwriter and musician
- Marion Hargrove (1919–2003), American writer, author of See Here, Private Hargrove
- Mark Hargrove (born 1956), American politician
- Mike Hargrove (born 1949), baseball player and manager
- Monica Hargrove (born 1982), American 200 and 400 metres runner
- Neal Hargrove, American wrestler
- Robert Kennon Hargrove (1829–1905), American bishop of the Methodist Episcopal Church
- Roy Hargrove (1969–2018), American jazz trumpeter

== Fictional characters ==
- Davinia Hargrove, from the BBC soap opera Doctors
- Billy Hargrove, from the TV series Stranger Things
- The title character of the military comedy films See Here, Private Hargrove and What Next, Corporal Hargrove?, based on the Marion Hargrove memoir

== See also ==
- Theosophical Society in America (Hargrove), organization that developed from the Theosophical Society in America
