= Who Killed Miracle? =

2009 documentary film

- Directed by: Scott Renyard
- Written by: Scott Renyard
- Produced by: Scott Renyard; Sandy Flanagan; Nooa Wuttunee
- Narrated by: August Schellenberg
- Cinematography: Goran Basaric
- Edited by: Maja Zdanowski; Kevin Harwood
- Music by: Heather Kenski
- Production company: Juggernaut Pictures
- Distributed by: Horizon Motion Pictures
- Release date: 2009
- Running time: 52 minutes
- Country: Canada
- Language: English
- Budget: $200,000

Who Killed Miracle? is a 2009 Canadian documentary film directed and produced by Scott Renyard that explores the life and controversial death of an orca named Miracle.

== Topic ==
The film chronicles the life and mysterious death of a baby orca whale named Miracle, who was found in distress near Nanaimo, British Columbia, in July 1977. After being rescued and rehabilitated, Miracle became a star performer at Sealand of the Pacific in Victoria, British Columbia. However after five years in captivity, she died under controversial circumstances in January 1982.

The documentary delves into the events leading up to her death, and explored whether it was a bungled plot by environmental activists to free the whale or a cover-up. The film is based on archival footage and interviews to present a narrative that questions the circumstance of Miracle’s death, and suggesting potential foul play or mishandling by those involved.

== Synopsis ==
In June 1977, a fisherman named Bill Davis accidentally discovered an orca calf, who had been weakened from starvation and a gunshot wound. At the time, the orcas were publicly viewed as being dangerous. After Bill got in touch with Sealand of the Pacific, the orca was provided medical care and was sent from Victoria to Sealand, and was subsequently named "Miracle". However, animal rights activists protested outside of Sealand for Miracle to be freed, with some threatening to burn the park down or free her themselves, which led to law enforcement involvement.

In captivity, Miracle was healthy and fully responded to her trainers, eventually becoming a performing whale for stimulation. Yet, this was viewed negatively by activists as they continued to protest. In January 1982, Miracle was found dead in her pen with an autopsy showing that the animal died from drowning. SCUBA certified divers investigated how the killer whale could have died, which led to the discovery of a narrow opening in the netting of her pen. The net was cut apart to allow her to escape, and Miracle’s body was found entangled the double netted-system of the pen. Initially, it was assumed that Greenpeace activists had made an attempt to free her by cutting the nets with knives or pliers. It was also assumed that she chewed herself free, but no teeth marks were found within the net, or that while playing with the netting of her pool, Miracle managed to wedge herself through the opening of the inner net; becoming trapped between the two nettings. Following this incident, the park utilized concrete pens to prevent further similar deaths.

== Production and release ==
The film was written, directed, and produced by Scott Renyard, and executive produced by Sandy Flanagan, and associatively produced by Nola Wuttunee. It was edited by Maja Zdanowski, sound edited by Kevin Harwood, and the cinematographer was Goran Basaric. The soundtrack and scores of the film was composed by Heather Kenski, while August Schellenberg narrated the film.

Renyard utilized previously unseen archival footage of Miracle’s rescue, scenes from her life in captivity, and interviewed with key individuals involved in her story to reveal the chain of events leading up to her death. In 2022, Scott Renyard published an 202-paged long illustrated screenplay of the documentary, titled Who Killed Miracle?.

== Awards ==
Won

- Best Nature Documentary - Yorkton Film Festival 2010
- Special Jury Prize - The Houston International Film Festival 2010
- Honorable Mention Animal Behavior - Blue Ocean Film Festival 2010

Nominated

- Official Selection - Victoria Film Festival 2010

== See also ==
- Blackfish (film)
- The Walrus and the Whistleblower
- The Whale (2011 film)
