= Howard G. Chua-Eoan =

Howard G. Chua-Eoan is a Filipino American journalist and author. He is currently international editor of Bloomberg Opinion, the opinion and editorials side of Bloomberg News. He was previously deputy editor of Bloomberg Businessweek and News Director of Time magazine, and is a New York Times bestselling author.

== Biography ==
Born in Manila, Philippines, Chua-Eoan migrated to the U.S. in October 1979 at the age of 20. He received a B.A. in English from Columbia University School of General Studies, receiving the John Angus Burrell Memorial Award as the outstanding English major of 1983. A year later, he received his M.S. in Journalism from Columbia's Graduate School of Journalism.

Chua-Eoan was Assistant Managing Editor for Time and editor of "Heroes & Inspirations," of the Time 100: People of the Century issues. He has written several books under the TIME Books imprint, including "Crimes of the Century" and "Pope for a New World: Pope Francis".

In June 2013, Chua-Eoan began writing the weekly Cocktails & Carnage column for Roads & Kingdoms.

With John Hargrove, Chua-Eoan published Beneath the Surface: Killer Whales, SeaWorld, and the Truth Beyond Blackfish in 2015, ISBN 978-1-13728010-7, which became a New York Times bestseller.
