= The Whale (2011 film) =

2011 film

- Film poster
- Directed by: Suzanne Chisholm; Michael Parfit
- Produced by: Suzanne Chisholm
- Narrated by: Ryan Reynolds
- Cinematography: Suzanne Chisholm; Michael Parfit
- Edited by: Michael Parfit
- Music by: David Parfit; Tobin Stokes
- Production companies: Mountainside Films; Telefilm Canada
- Release date: September 9, 2011 (U.S.)
- Running time: 85 minutes
- Country: Canada
- Language: English

The Whale is a 2011 documentary film directed by Suzanne Chisholm and Michael Parfit. Narrated by Ryan Reynolds, it tells the story of Luna, a killer whale (orca) living in Nootka Sound, Canada, who was separated from his pod at a young age.

== Production ==
The Whale was produced by Suzanne Chisholm, with Eric Desatnik, Scarlett Johansson and Ryan Reynolds serving as executive producers. It is based on and uses the same footage as Chisholm's and Parfit's 2007 documentary Saving Luna, narrated by Parfit. The reworked version was rewritten to tell the story from a third-person perspective and focuses less on the directors' personal involvement in Luna's life.

== Reception ==
On review aggregator website Rotten Tomatoes, the film holds an 83% rank based on 23 reviews, with an average rating of 6.8/10.

Andy Webster of The New York Times suggested that "A documentary ideal for schoolrooms, family viewing, and discussion", while Todd McCarthy of The Hollywood Reporter, called the film "Serious-minded, thought-provoking animal documentary [that] will have a lengthy life, mostly in ancillary markets".

Not everyone from the critics had positive thoughts about the film. Brian Miller of The Village Voice said that "[w]hile they fluff up the conflict between the "no touching" feds and Luna-besotted locals, all parties are simply too polite, decent, and Canadian for any real drama".

Ronnie Scheib of Variety was also not impressed. According to him, "[the] [d]ocu[mentary] dotes on its adorable, highly photogenic star, but nonstop voiceover commentary and exclamations of wonderment tend to lessen rather than enhance its impact".

== Awards and nominations ==
- Newport Beach Film Festival (2012), Outstanding Achievement In Filmmaking (Environmental)

== See also ==
- Blackfish (film)
