= Ed Hargrove =

American and Canadian football player and coach

Ed Hargrove is an American former professional football player and coach.

== Biography ==
=== Early life and education ===
Hargrove was born in Norfolk, Virginia. He completed his undergraduate studies in Health and Physical Education at East Carolina University prior to being signed as a professional football player. He later completed a master's degree in Community Counseling at Barry University.

=== Career ===
Hargrove was signed by the Pittsburgh Steelers in 1964. He also played for the Minnesota Vikings and the CFL Montreal Alouettes.

After retiring from playing, he worked as a strength coach for the Miami Hurricanes football team and the Atlanta Falcons, where he was named the NFC Pro Bowl Strength Coach in 1981.
