= Orca Welfare and Safety Act =

Animal protection legislation in California, US

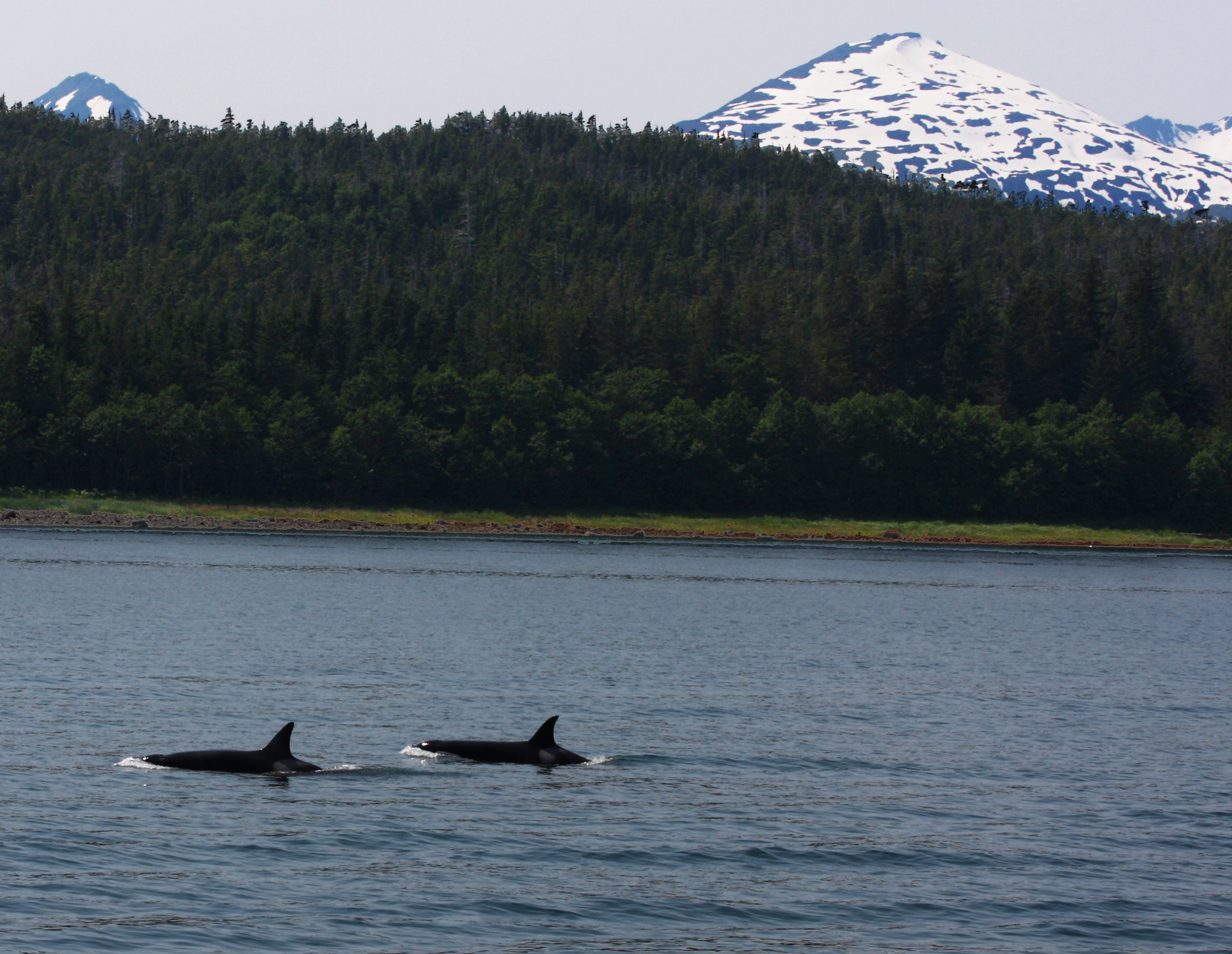
A pod of orcas moving through the inland waters of Alaska.

The Orca Welfare and Safety Act is a bill passed in the U.S. state of California in 2016. The bill phases out the holding of killer whales in captivity and establishes standards for treatment of all remaining captive orcas in zoos.

The bill has been interpreted as being particularly targeted at the wildlife parks chains that hold Marine mammals such as SeaWorld and a response to the film Blackfish. Since the beginning of orca captivity in 1961 there have been 156 orcas held in captivity. As of 2024, there are 55 orcas held in captivity around the world and SeaWorld owns 18 of them, including eight at its San Diego, California park.

== Legislative process ==
In 2014, California Assembly member Richard Bloom introduced the assembly bill 2140 known as the Orca Welfare and Safety Act. In April 2014 there was a live hearing in the Committee of Water, Parks, and Wildlife where there was no initial decision and the bill was set aside for an interim study. The bill sat for two years until March 2016 when it was reintroduced as AB 2305 and put to a vote. In April the bill passed the California Assembly with no opposition and moved onto the senate renamed as AB 1453. After the bill passed the senate, the Governor of California, Jerry Brown, signed the Orca Welfare and Safety Act in September 2016 and the bill went into effect January 2017.

== Law ==
The Orca Welfare and Safety Act makes it generally illegal for any person hold an orca in captivity, breed an orca, export or import orca gametes and embryos, or move any orcas to a facility that doesn't satisfy Animal Welfare Act standards. The law provides an exemption from the automatic captivity ban for orcas already held in captivity and for orcas kept by a "bona fide bona fide educational or scientific institution" for rescue, rehabilitation, or research purposes. A person's negligent or intentional violation of the law is subject to misdemeanor charges and up to a $100,000 penalty.

== Response ==
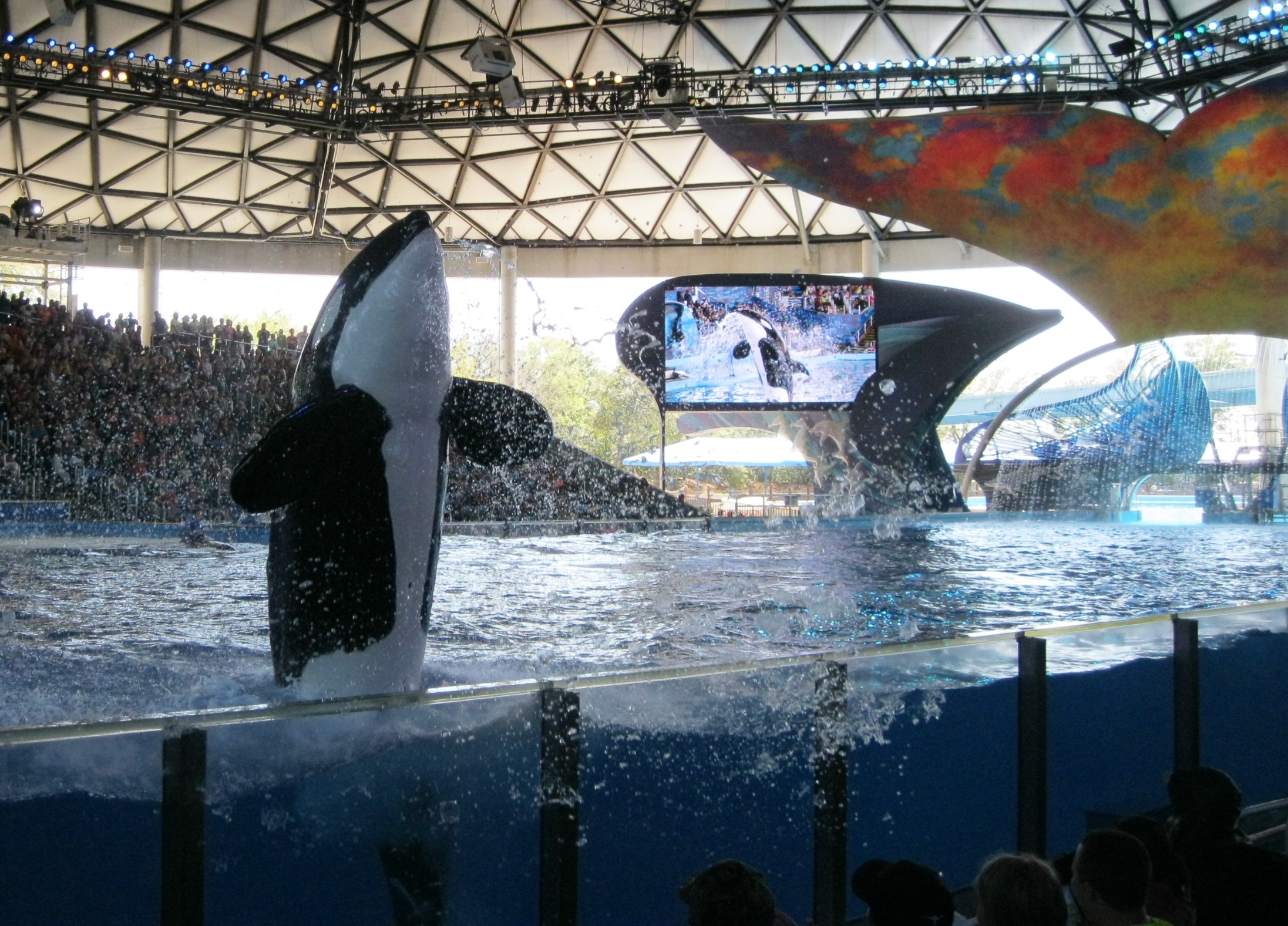
This is a picture of the Shamu show at Sea World San Antonio, taken on March 14, 2013.

In 2014 with the introduction of AB 2140 SeaWorld responded by releasing plans of a new expansion to the orca enclosure in San Diego called "Blue World". This was a $100 million expansion that would give the guests a more natural orca experience. In 2015 the California Coastal Commission approved SeaWorld's coastal development permit Application 6–15–0424, but they added a ban on breeding and the import and export of the orcas. SeaWorld did not agree with the decision and sued the California Coastal Commission claiming they did not have the authority to ban orca breeding in captivity. In April 2016 after the bill passed the California Assembly, SeaWorld withdrew their expansion plans of "Blue World" and released a statement saying they would use the $100 million for other exhibits and attractions in the park.

SeaWorld San Diego then announced that they would end the theatrical orca shows, which the last show was in January 2017, and would transition to a new "Orca Encounter Exhibit". The company claims it will make the encounter more realistic to their natural setting and will aim towards research, education, care, and respect for the Orcas.

Some former SeaWorld trainers and animal rights advocates have continued to call on SeaWorld to retire captive orcas to the wild or seaside sanctuaries, arguing that the conditions of captivity are inherently cruel.

== See also ==
- Ending the Captivity of Whales and Dolphins Act (Canada)
