= John Hargreaves =

John Hargreaves may refer to:

- John Hargreaves (businessman) (born 1944), founder of British discount retailer Matalan
- John Hargreaves (actor) (1945–1996), Australian actor
- John Hargreaves (Australian Capital Territory politician) (born 1949), member of the Australian Capital Territory Legislative Assembly
- John Hargreaves (Queensland politician) (1839–1907), member of the Queensland Legislative Assembly
- John Hargreaves (cricketer) (born 1944), English cricketer
- John Hargreaves (footballer) (1860–1903), England international footballer
- John D. Hargreaves (1924–2015), professor of history at the University of Aberdeen
- John Hargreaves (carrier) (1780–1860), English carrier and businessman
- John Hargreaves (early railway operator) (1800–1874), English carrier, railway entrepreneur and manufacturing businessman
- John Hargreaves (snooker player) (born 1945), English snooker player

== See also ==
- Jack Hargreaves (1911–1994), British author and television presenter
- John Hargrave (disambiguation)
