= Wildlife World Zoo =

Zoo and aquarium in Arizona, US

Wildlife World Zoo & Aquarium
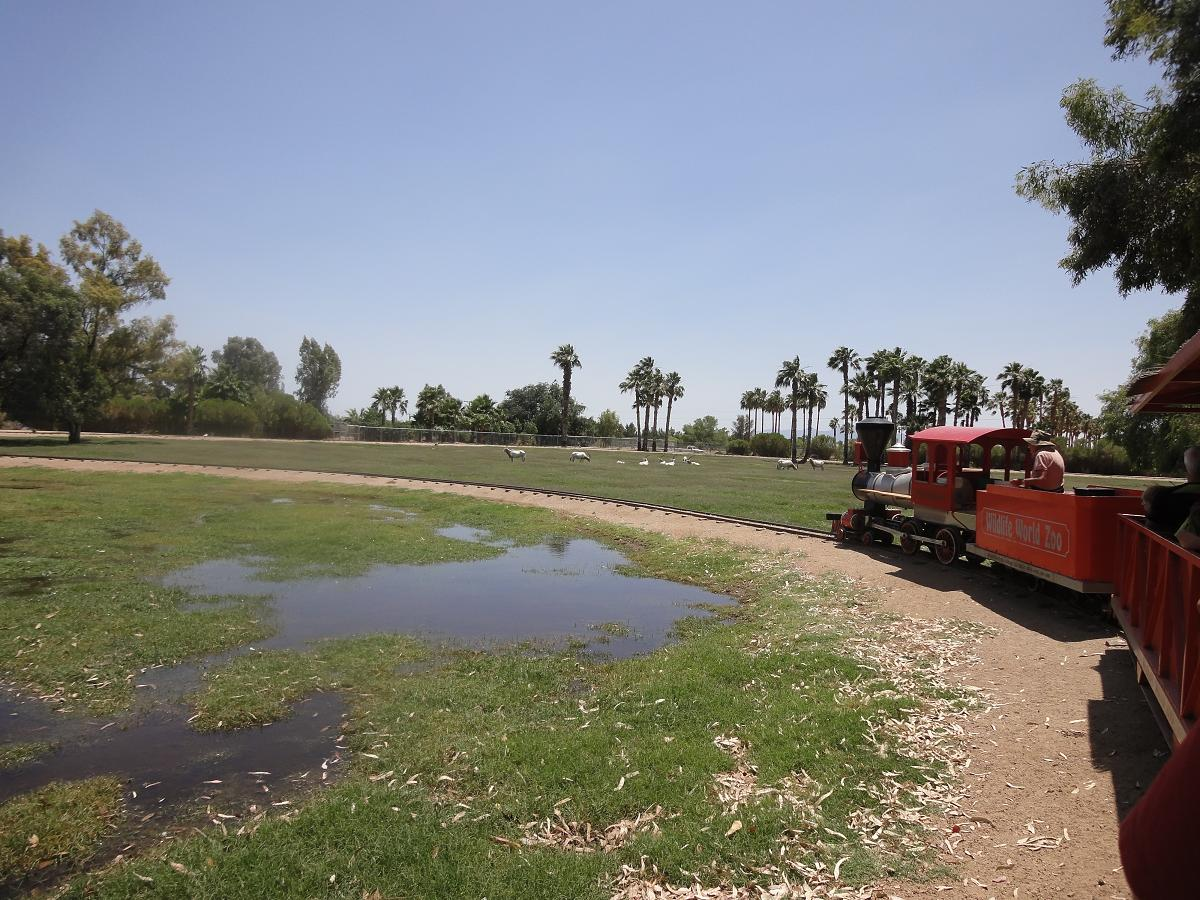
- Wildlife World Zoo Safari Train
- Interactive map of Wildlife World Zoo & Aquarium
- 33.5490379°N 112.4127552°W
- Date opened: 1984 (Zoo); 2008 (Aquarium)
- Location: Litchfield Park, Arizona, United States
- Land area: 215 acres (87 ha)
- No. of animals: 3,000
- No. of species: 600
- Total volume of tanks: 180,000 US gallons (681,000 L)
- Annual visitors: 500,000
- Website: www.wildlifeworld.com

Wildlife World Zoo & Aquarium is a 215-acre (87 ha) zoo and aquarium in Litchfield Park, Arizona, United States, near Phoenix. The zoo specializes in African and South American animals, and has Arizona's largest collection of exotic animals. It has a 0.6 miles (970 m) "safari train", a boat ride through the Australian habitat, a tram through another segment of the African habitat, and several amusement-oriented rides. Since 2008, it also has an aquarium with a total tank volume of 180,000 US gallons (681,000 L).

== Sections of the zoo ==
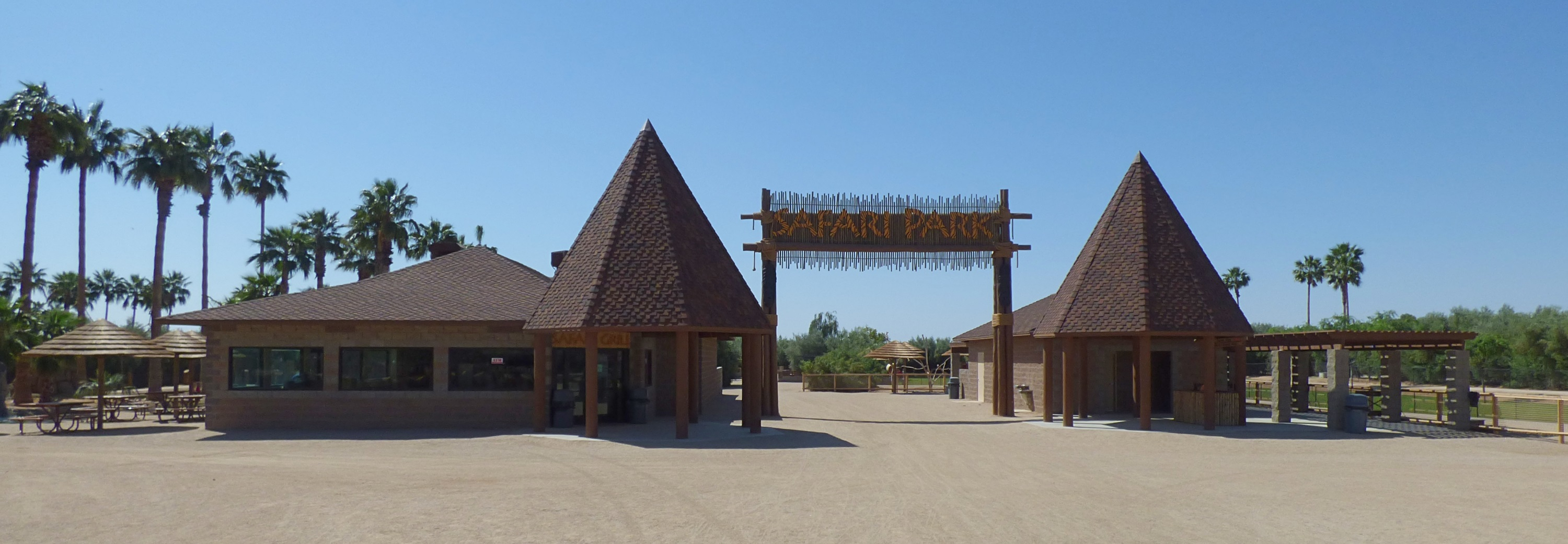
Safari Park entrance

Safari Park A 15-acre park featuring an African lion habitat and African birds. Visitors can walk or take a tram through exhibits.

Species in the Safari Park include: springbok, spider monkey, African lion, macaw, capuchin, Fischer's lovebird, sable antelope, ostrich, warthog, olive baboon, red river hog, ring-tailed lemur, spotted hyena.

Wildlife World Adventureland

The newest addition to the zoo which opened in February 2016, this area includes a new Mexican restaurant, and several new ride attractions. These rides include a roller coaster, zip line, and swings.opened in February 2016.

Species in Adventureland include: llamas, American bison, spider monkeys, bears, ocelots, and a North American indoor exhibit.

Dragon World

Dragon World features animal exhibits featuring large ectotherms.

Animals include, sailfin dragon, reticulated python, dwarf crocodile, Gila monster, green iguana, and green anaconda.

Aquarium

The Wildlife World Aquarium is Arizona's first public aquarium, and features salt- and fresh-water species including sea lions and varieties of penguins.

== History ==
Wildlife World Zoo was started as a breeding farm for birds by Mickey Ollson, a teacher, on 5 acres (2.0 ha) in Glendale, Arizona. In 1973 Ollson purchased 25 acres (10 ha) at the current site in Litchfield Park. The zoo grew by breeding and trading animals with other zoos. The zoo opened to the public in 1984 and has continued to grow by purchasing the surrounding property. The aquarium opened in 2008, the Safari Park opened in 2014, and Adventureland opened in 2016.

== Accreditation ==
The Wildlife World Zoo operates as a private USDA-licensed facility for animal care, and is accredited by the Alliance of Marine Mammal Parks & Aquariums and the Zoological Association of America (ZAA). The ZAA has received criticism due to its alleged relaxed requirements for accreditation regarding animal welfare.

== Baby animal nursery ==
There are more than 600 species at Wildlife World. The babies available to view change from week to week.

== Gallery ==
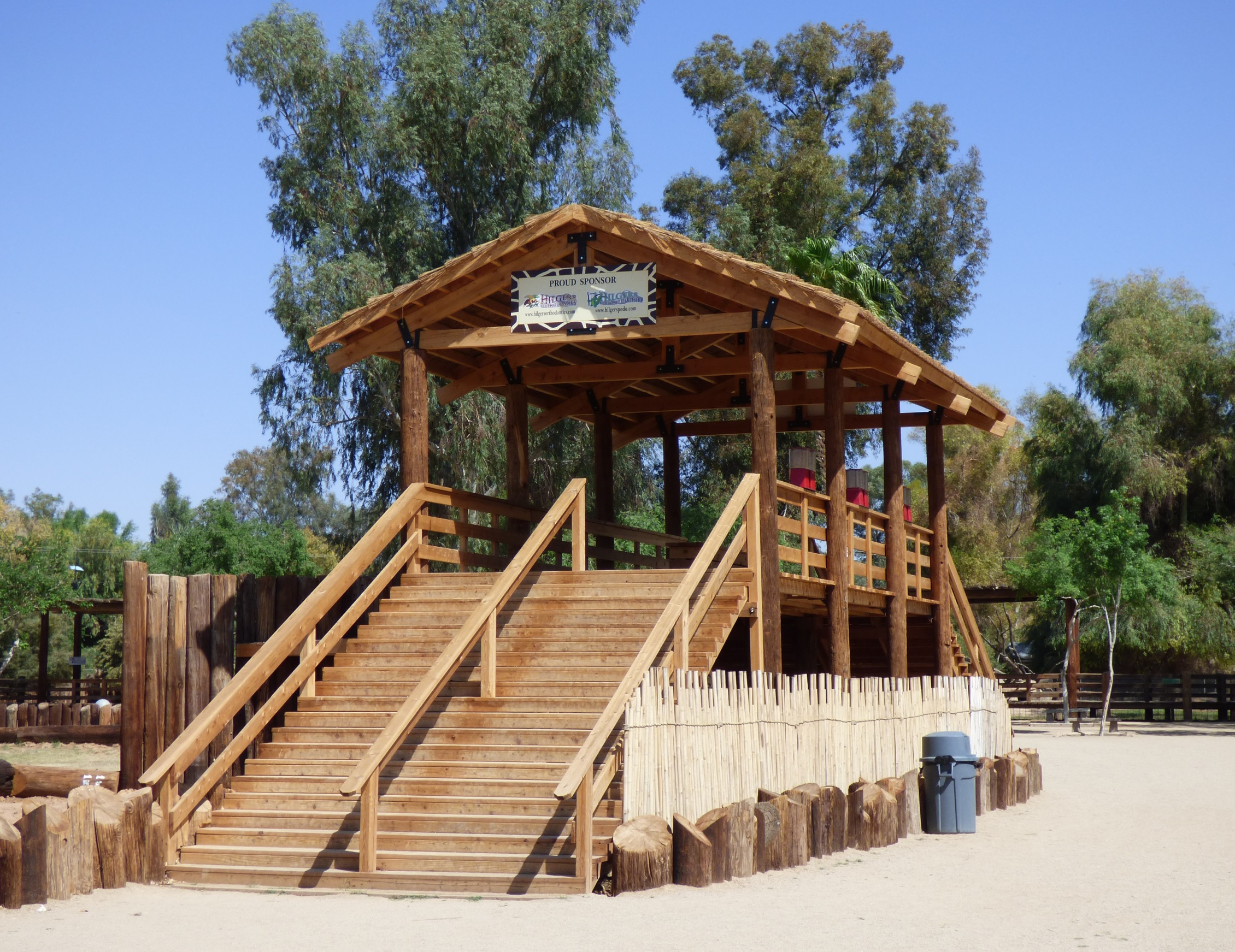
Safari Park giraffe feeding platform

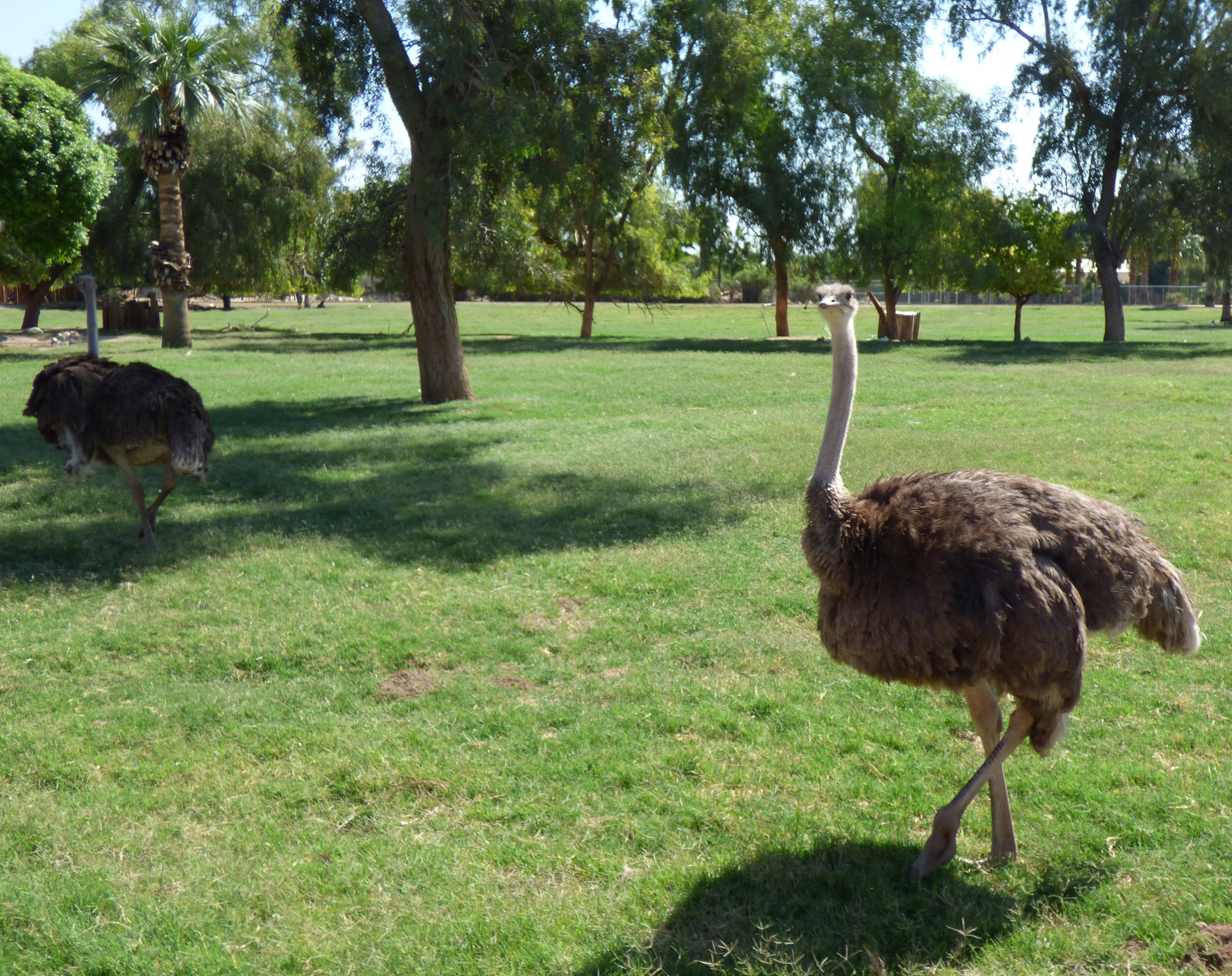
Ostriches

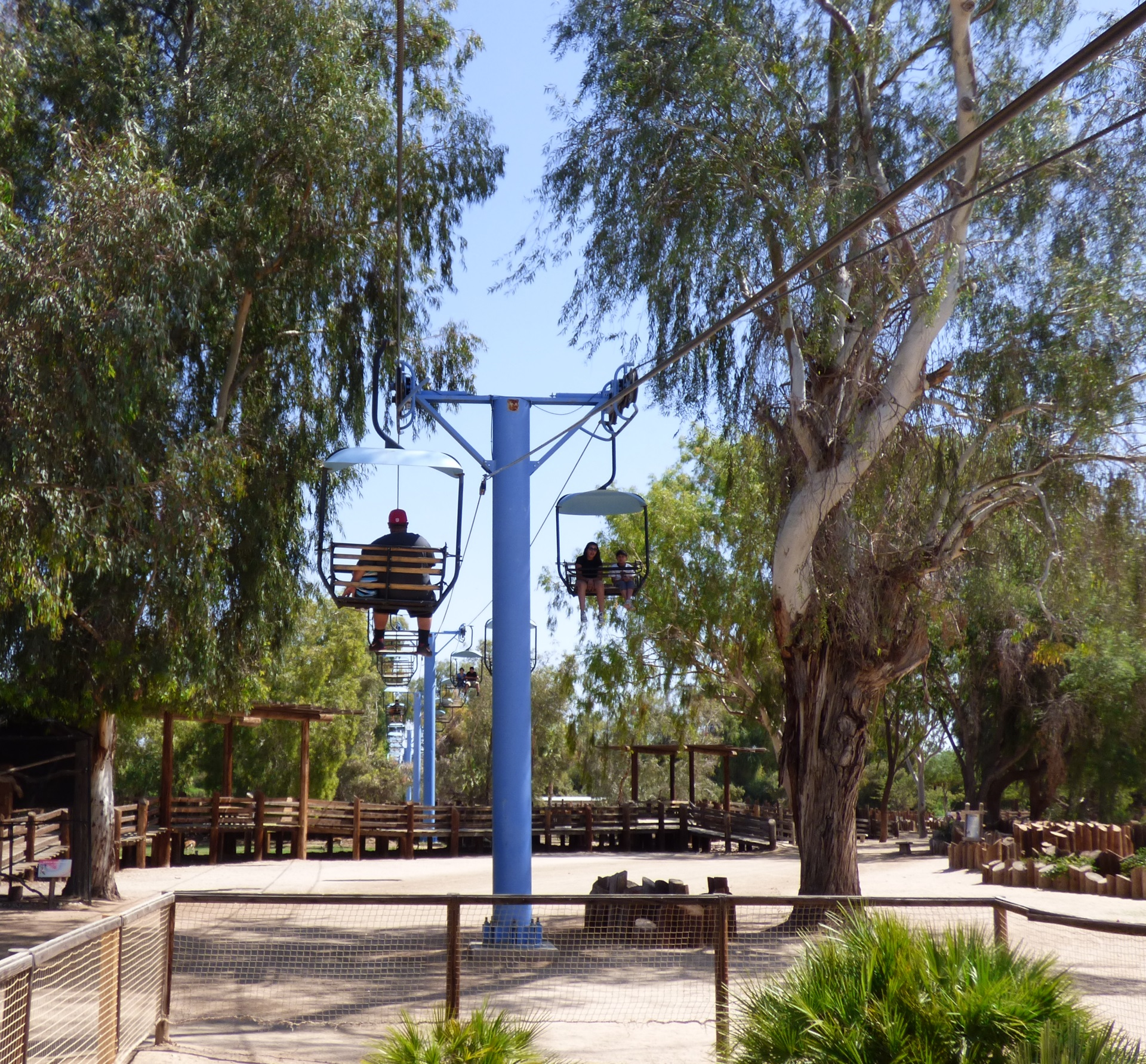
Cable lift through the park

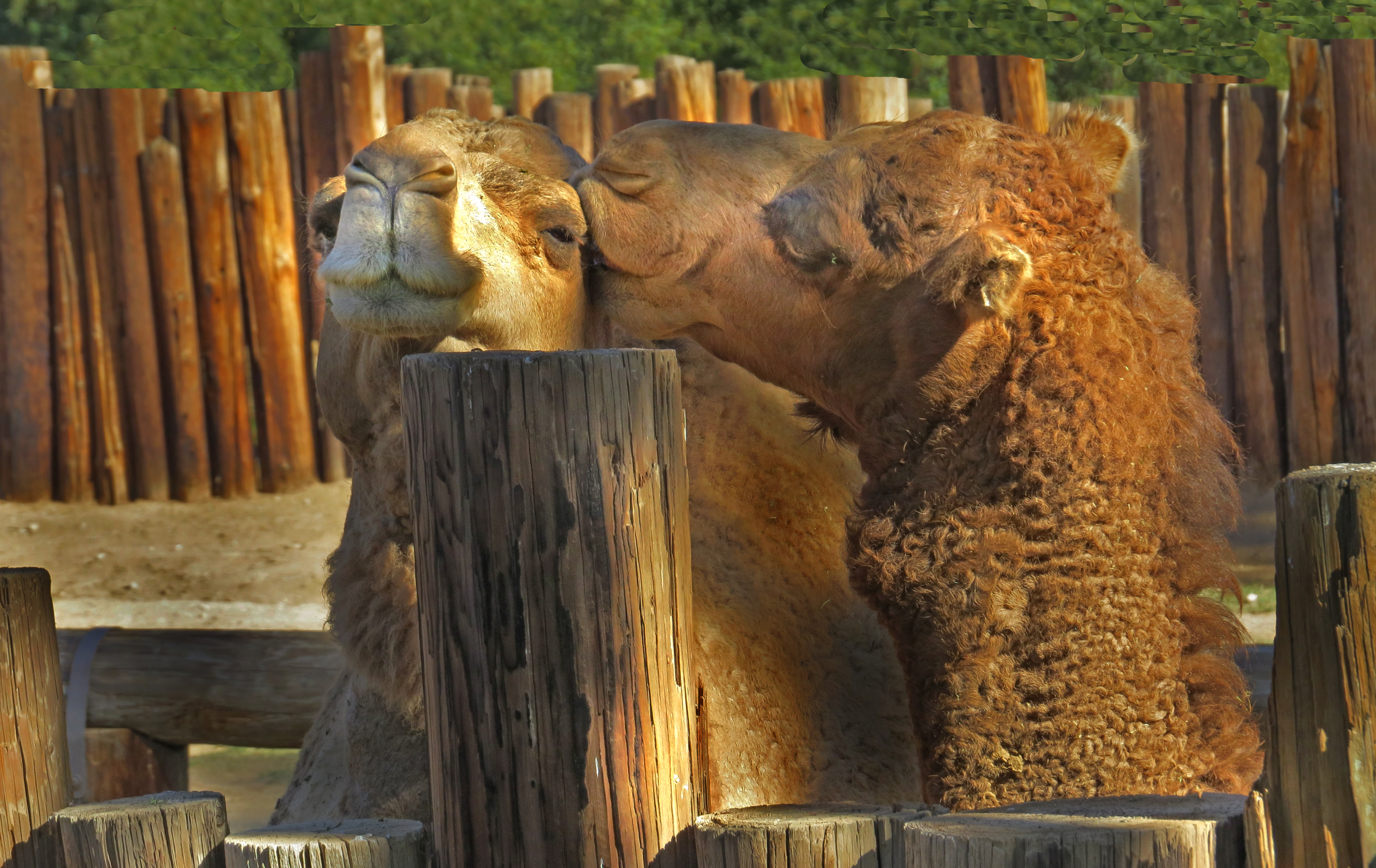
Camels

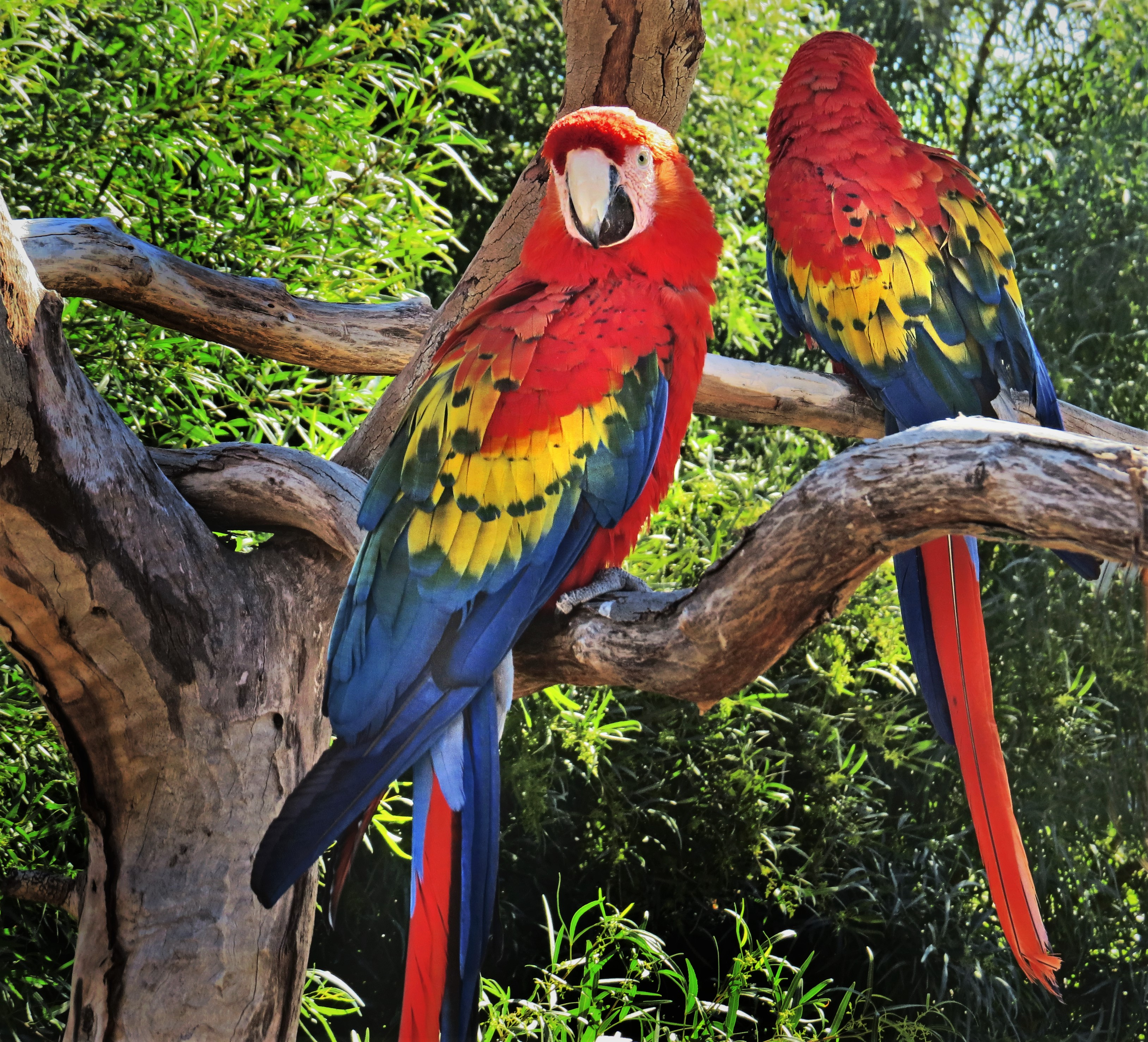
Macaws

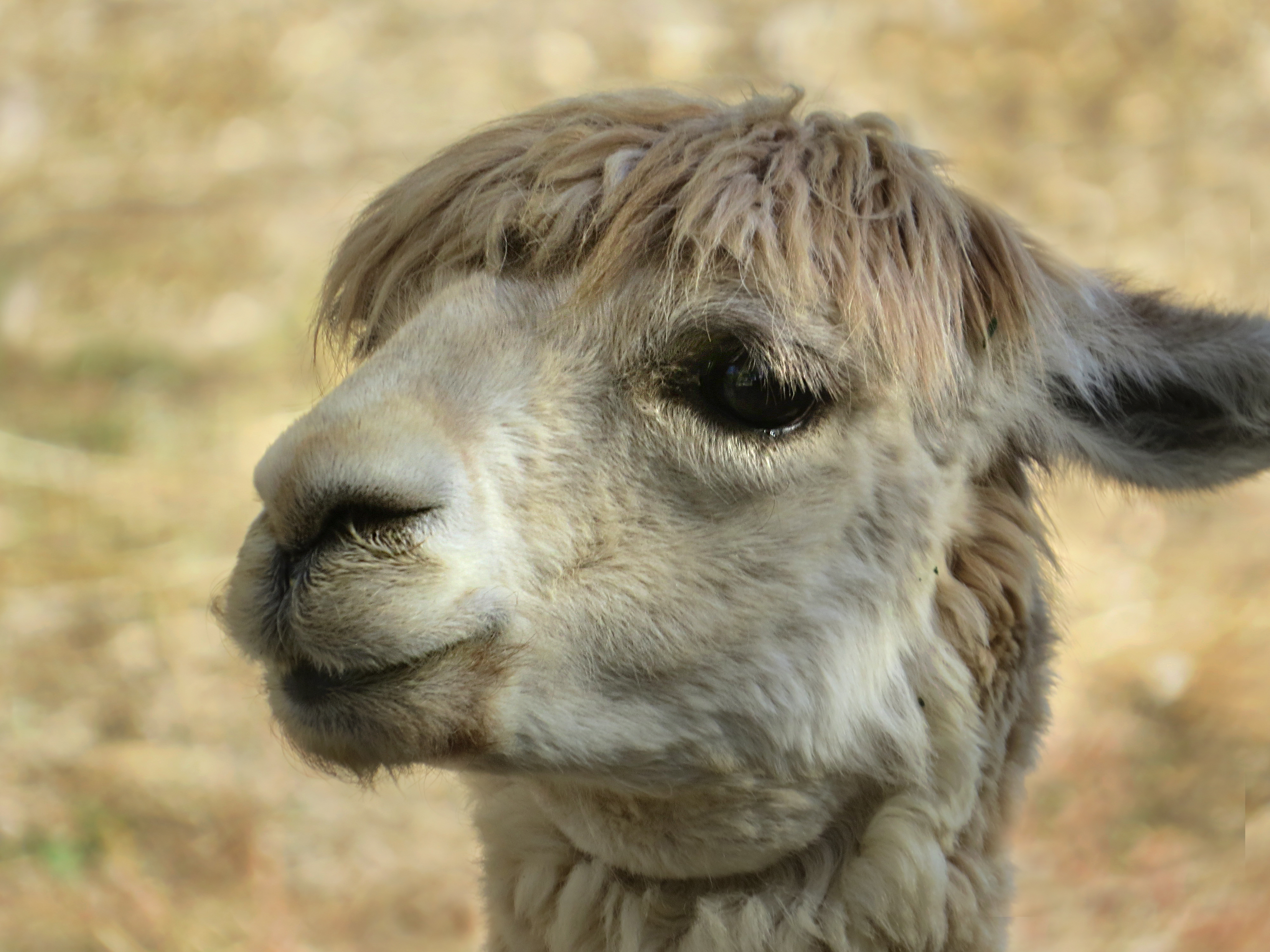
Alpaca

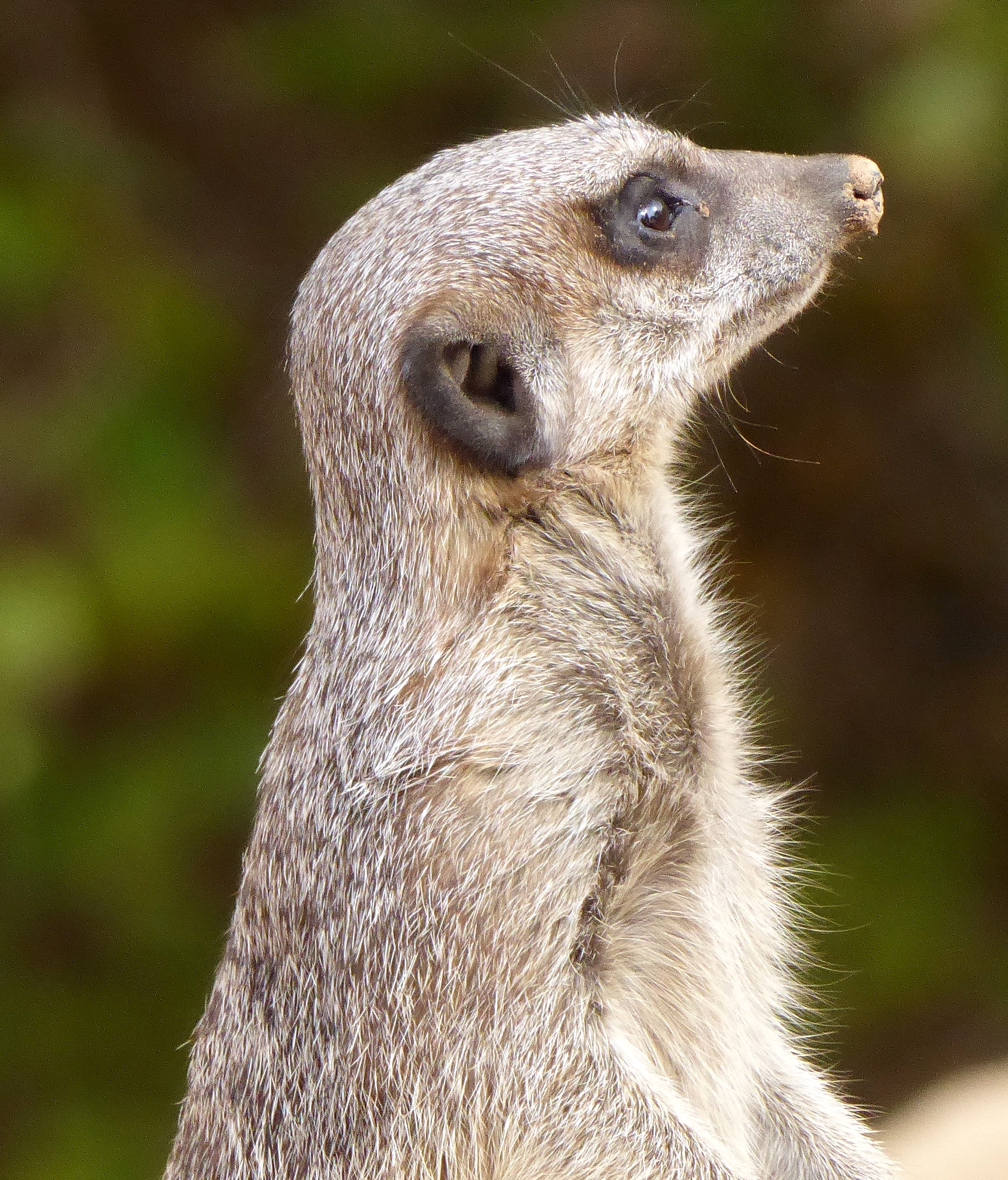
Meerkat (Suricata suricatta)

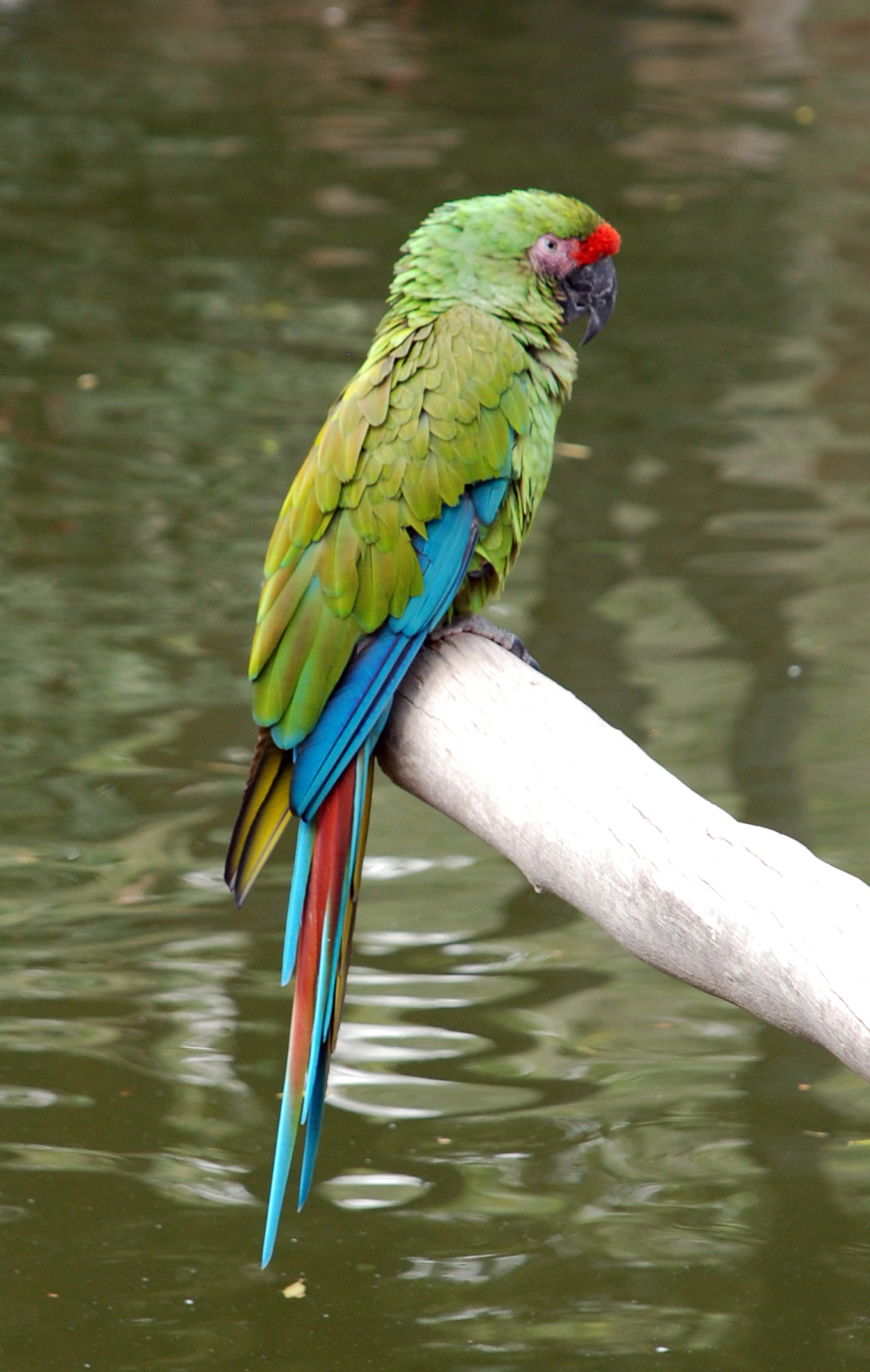
Military macaw (Ara militaris)

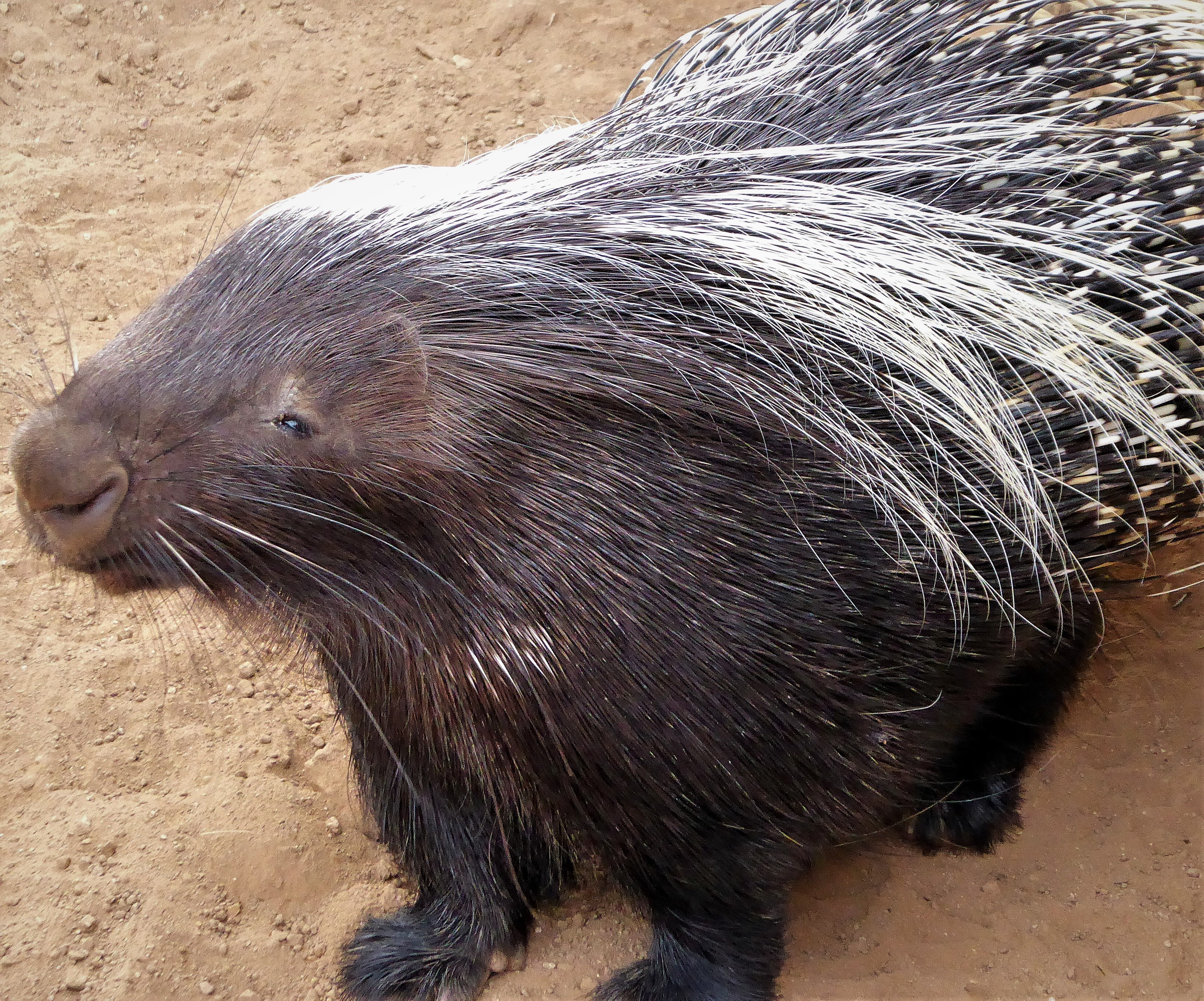
Porcupine

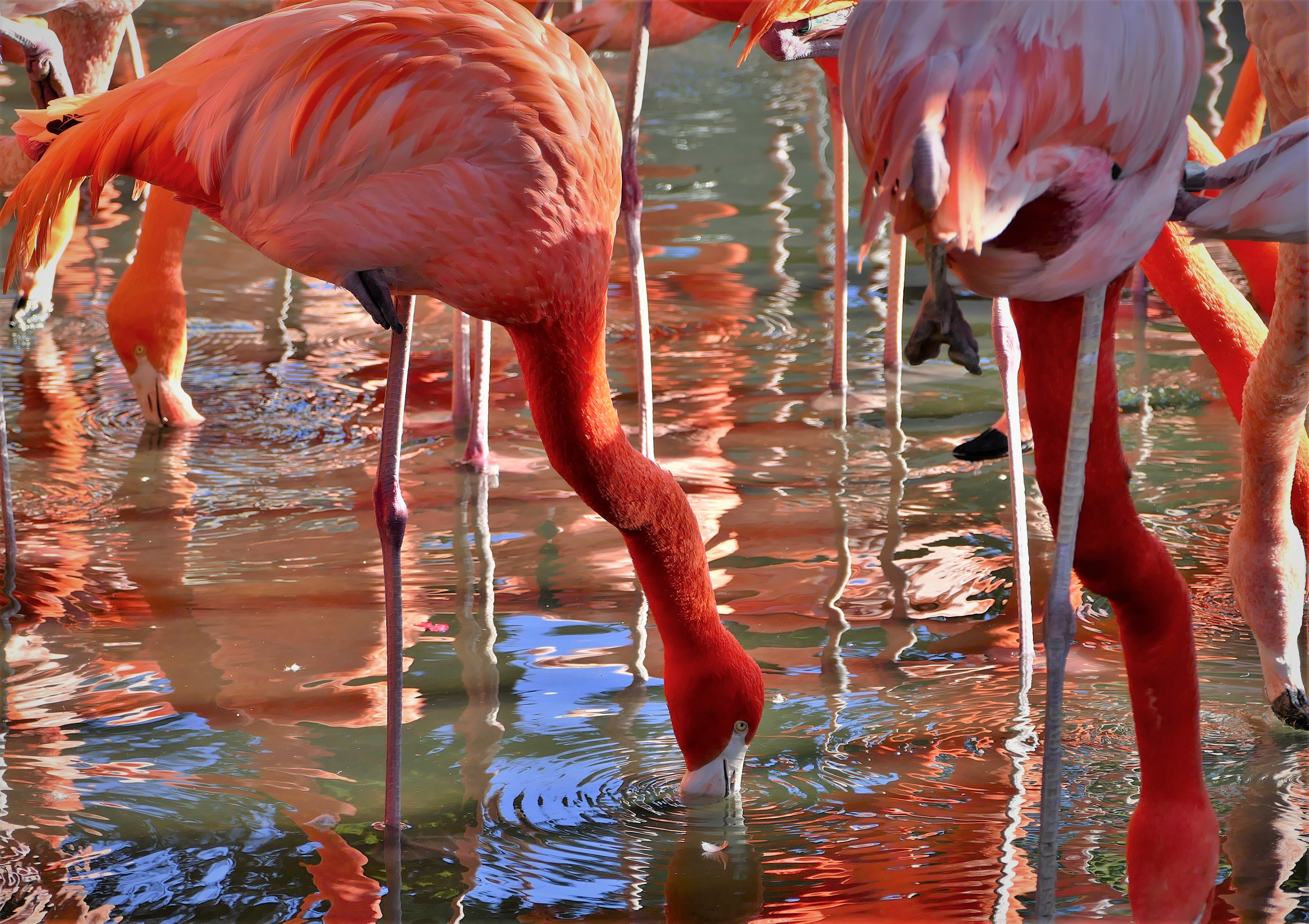
Flamingos
