= Mother and Baby Home =

Housing for unmarried pregnant women

A Mother and Baby Home was a form of maternity home for unmarried pregnant women and girls in the UK, the Republic of Ireland, New Zealand, Belgium and the Netherlands. The earliest institution to support unwed mothers was the first Magdalen Hospital, built in London in 1772. Penitentiaries, which were established later in an attempt to reform prostitutes to pay for the "sin" of having given birth to an illegitimate child, treated the residents as inmates, and made them undertake hard physical labour; by contrast, early Dutch homes attempted to re-educate prostitutes on religious principles. During the 20th century, British Mother and Baby Homes moved towards providing unmarried women with accommodation both before and after they had given birth. In many (but not all) cases, the child was taken from the mother for adoption, and she then returned to resume her life without ever revealing to her family or the local community that she had become pregnant. Residents in Mother and Baby Homes were often given chores. The homes could be shabby, restrictive, unsupportive towards young mothers, or intrusive.

Following the foundation of the National Health Service in 1948, unmarried mothers in the UK became eligible for the same benefits as were given to married parents, benefits that could be supplemented by the newly-established National Assistance Board. Until 1964, Mother and Baby Homes there were self-regulated, and many were run by church bodies. By the late 1960s, homes were catering for 20% of extra-marital pregnancies. By this time a change in the attitude towards unmarried mothers was taking place in the UK and elsewhere. Since the 1980s, single mothers have been more generally accepted, and Mother and Baby Homes no longer exist.

Mother and Baby Homes were founded in Ireland in the 1920s as a way to secretly house unmarried mothers and their children. Some operated as workhouses, forcing the women in them to do exhausting and unpaid work. Some mothers and their children were physically and mentally abused by the nuns who ran the homes. In the Republic of Ireland, the Commission of Investigation into Mother and Baby Homes and certain related matters was established in 2015 by the Irish government to investigate deaths and misconduct from the 1920s to the end of the 1980s in 18 Mother and Baby Homes. The Irish government formally apologised for its part in the scandal in January 2021.

== England, Scotland, and Wales ==
=== 18th century ===
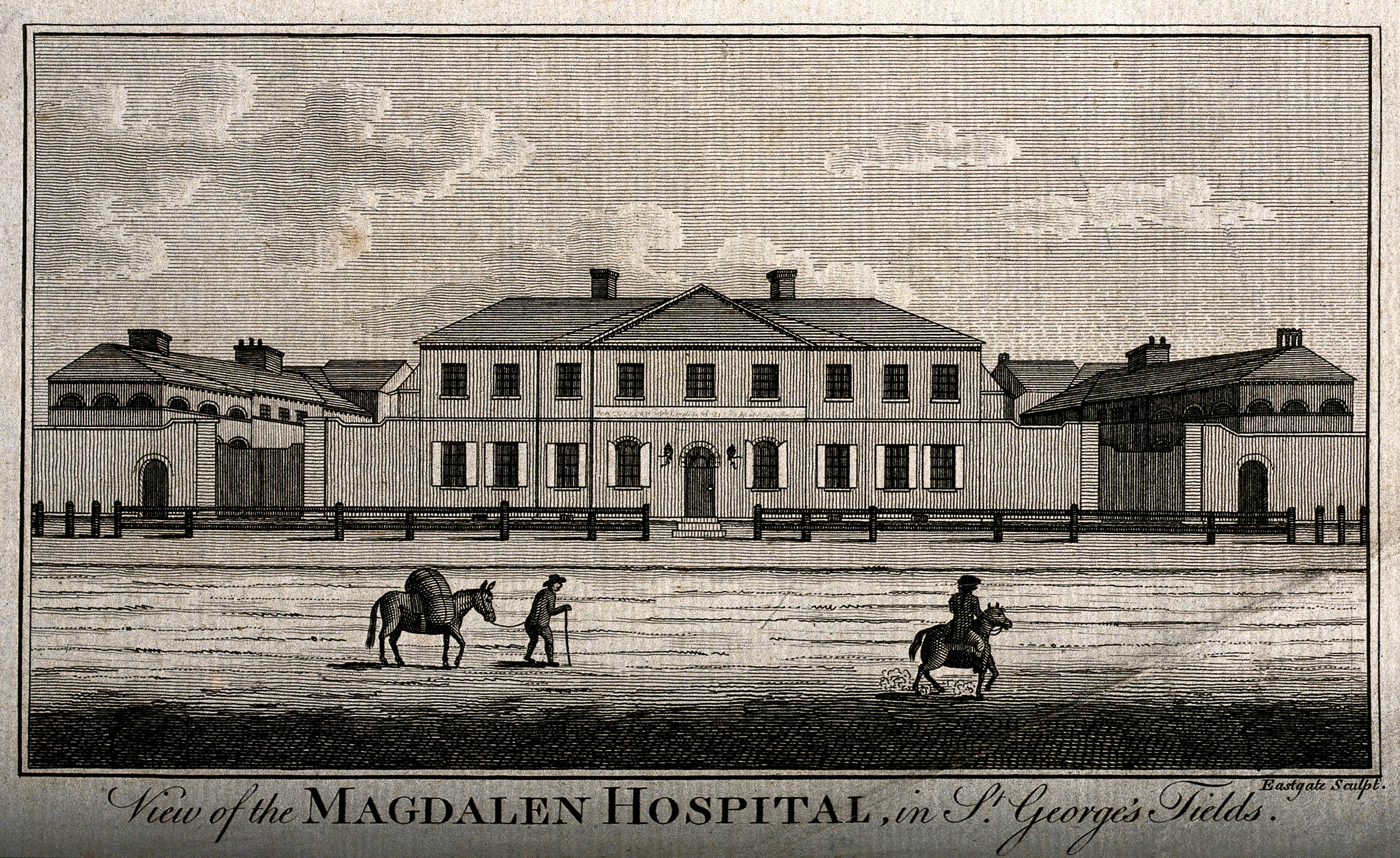
The first Magdalen Hospital, St George's Fields, Southwark, built in 1772 as a replacement for the earlier hospital founded in 1758

The first British institutions set up to provide accommodation and support for unmarried pregnant women and girls were established during the 18th century and the beginning of the 19th century. The earliest Magdalen Hospital for reformed prostitutes below the age of 20 was founded in 1758, at Whitechapel in East London. It relocated to larger premises at St George's Fields, Southwark in 1772. The women there helped to provide funds to support the hospital by working at services and crafts. Additional income was generated by promoting the house as a tourist attraction.

Later homes—referred to as penitentiaries (or 'reformatories')—were a harsher attempt to reform prostitutes, who were separated from their newly-born babies as part of their penitence, a price they were expected to pay for their individual sin in producing an illegitimate child. The residents, which included older women than had previously been the case, were treated as inmates, locked away from the outside world and made to undertake hard physical work as preparation for suitable low-paid employment they would be expected seek after their release.

=== 19th century ===
During the Victorian era, many unmarried mothers-to-be who were too poor to support a child had little choice but to enter a workhouse. A clause in the Poor Law Amendment Act 1834 stated that unlike married mothers, they were ineligible to obtain any financial assistance if living at home. Charitable bodies such as Barnardo's and the Salvation Army were initially founded to rescue homeless and destitute children from the streets of London. The first home operated by the Salvation Army, at 271 Mare Street in the London borough of Hackney, opened in 1890.

=== 1900s–World War 1 ===
During the 20th century, Mother and Baby Homes moved towards providing unmarried girls and women with accommodation and the support they needed prior to, and following, the birth of their baby. The support was provided whilst decisions were made about the future for the child, a future that often included the possibility of it being adopted. Mother and Baby Homes, which were distributed throughout the British Isles, were linked to social welfare organisations and adoption agencies. The Salvation Army had established nine homes by 1913.

During the first two decades of the 20th century, the proportion of illegitimate children in England was lower than that in Scotland, which had an average rate (in 1900) that was higher than in many European countries. Illegitimacy was accepted in some Scottish communities during the 1900s, where children of unmarried parents were accepted by immediate and extended family members, particularly in the northeastern rural districts.

=== 1920s–World War 2 ===
Adoption had no legal status in England and Wales before 1926, and in Scotland before 1930. Even then, the mother could not give her baby away informally. During the 1920s, the Salvation Army published Orders and Regulations, which governed the running of their Mother and Baby Homes. This information was updated in 1962. The National Council for the Unmarried Mother and Her Child was founded in the 1920s, designed to increase awareness amongst unmarried mothers of the burden of bringing up a child alone and encouraging them to keep their babies. The Council saw this as a way for mothers to avoid having further pregnancies. An amendment to the Scottish Maternity and Child Welfare Act highlighted the same aim.

In contrast with elsewhere in the UK, Scottish Mother and Baby Homes were founded with the aim of keeping the mother and baby together. A Midwives and Maternity Homes (Scotland) Act was passed in 1927, introducing a licensing and inspection regime for maternity homes, which did not appear in England and Wales until after the Second World War.

Privately-run Lying-in Homes are less well documented than public institutions. They were more common in the first quarter of the 20th century at a time when unmarried mothers were starting to be perceived by the public to be a moral and social issue, and may have targeted the children of unmarried mothers for adoption.

=== Post-war period ===
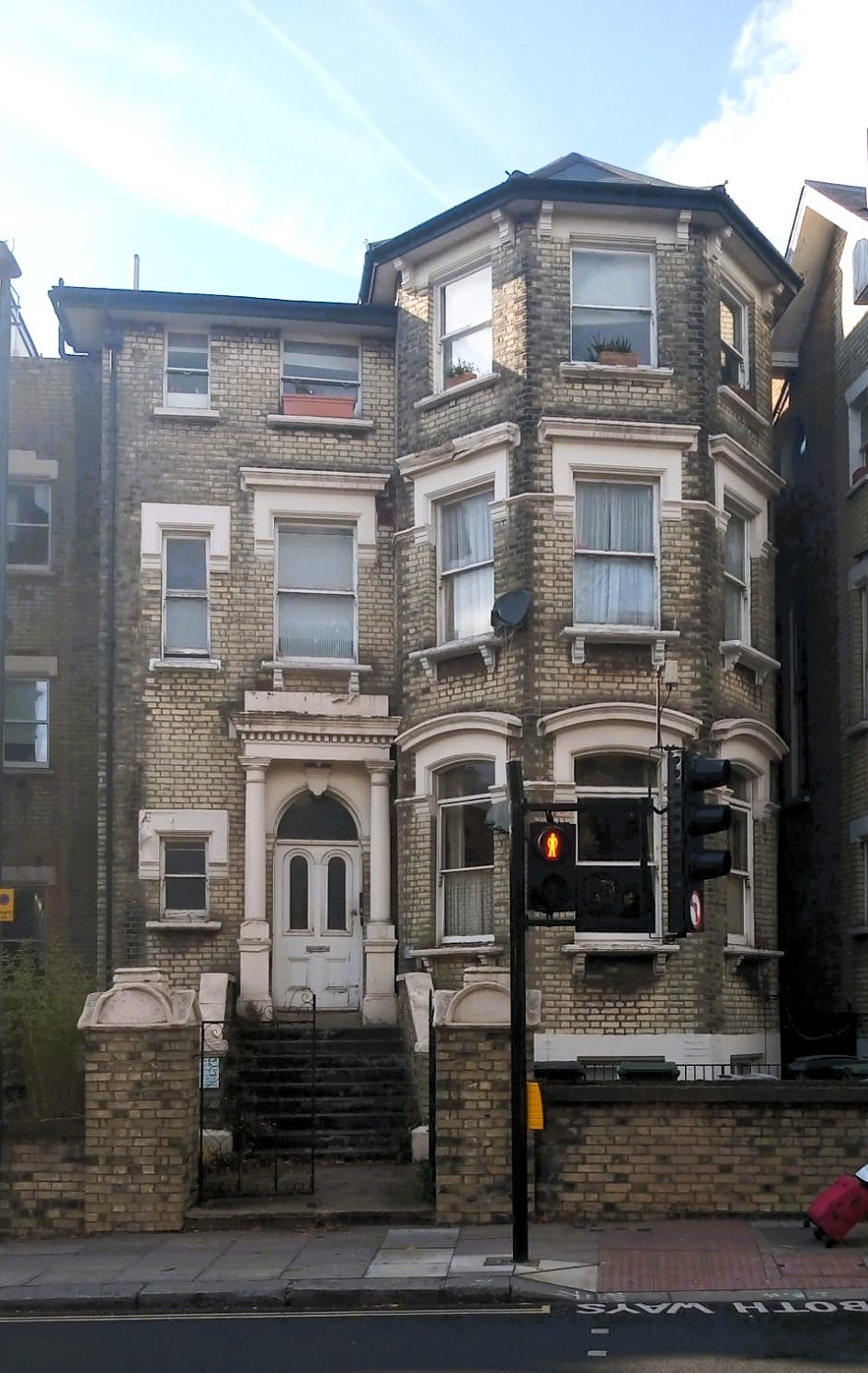
The Main Memorial Home in West Hampstead, a Mother and Baby Home run by the Paddington and St Marylebone Ladies Association. It was established in 1935.

The foundation of the National Health Service in 1948 provided mothers and children with free healthcare. Employed women could claim financial support when sick. Unmarried mothers were eligible for the same funds as those that were married, so that they were no longer forced to work almost until childbirth, except that any Maternity Allowance they claimed for was means tested. These benefits could be supplemented in cases of need by the newly-established National Assistance Board.

Both the rising levels of couples living together in Britain during the 1960s onwards and the increase in children jointly registered by them, led to a change in the attitude towards unmarried mothers. Research undertaken in the mid-1960s by Jill Nicholson found that 80% of the known 172 Mother and Baby Homes in England were provided by church organisations. Most of the homes' residents were expected to attend church. The matron who ran the home was responsible in determining the quality of care received by the residents. Nicholson reported that the material conditions of most homes were poor, though the food was usually adequate. Residents often had to do household chores such as cleaning and cooking. Nicholson reported that “Most of the homes were shabby and inadequate with lots of restrictions, intrusions on privacy and an erosion of responsibility" and that "they often lacked social work support, failed to assist in the management of ‘mothering’ and were limited by a fixed length of stay”. It was found that the women and girls were better off in homes with fewer than 10 or more than 20 residents; otherwise hostilities between the women emerged.

The expectant mother would under normal circumstanced have had access to a caseworker that helped her to plan for the future and support her once her child was born. Few of the homes were able to cater for girls and women more than six weeks before the expected birth of the baby. Jean Pochin, who reported in 1969 about the experiences of unmarried parents, found that by this time fathers were allowed to visit Mother and Baby Homes.

After 1964, Mother and Baby Homes were no longer self-regulated and were required to register the placements they offered. By the late 1960s, Mother and Baby Homes were catering for 11-12,000 (20%) of the annual number of extra-marital pregnancies in the UK. It was noted in the 1974 Finer Report on One-Parent Families that Mother and Baby Homes in England were not required to be inspected.

== Ireland ==
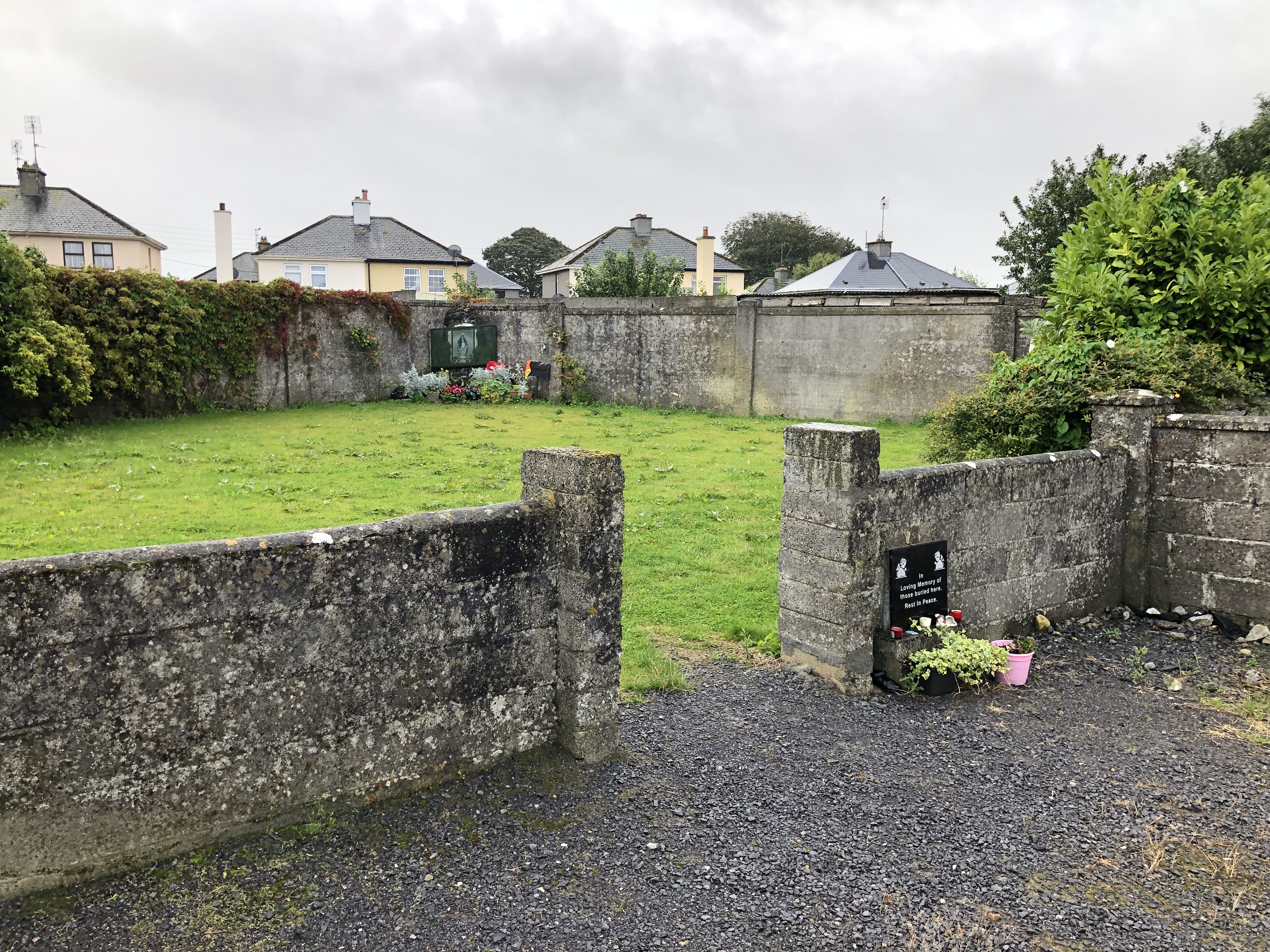
View of the mass grave at the Bon Secours Mother and Baby Home, Tuam

Mother and Baby Homes were founded in Ireland in the 1920s, to house unmarried mothers and their children, so excluding them from the rest of society. At least 12 homes were run by Roman Catholic nuns, three of which incorporated Magdalene Laundries, which operated as workhouses, forcing the women in them to do exhausting and unpaid work. The mothers and their small children are now known to have been physically and mentally abused by the nuns.

=== Deaths and misconduct in homes in the Republic of Ireland ===
The Commission of Investigation into Mother and Baby Homes and certain related matters was established in 2015 by the Irish government to investigate deaths and misconduct from the 1920s to the end of the 1980s in mother and baby homes in the Republic of Ireland. The homes were mostly run by nuns. During this period, 57,000 babies were born to girls and women who resided within the 18 institutions investigated. The mortality rate for the babies born—15 per cent—was never raised as a cause for concern by the government or the Catholic Church. In particular, 973 children died at the Bon Secours Mother and Baby Home (in Tuam, County Galway), according to the commission. It reported that a number of the children had been discovered inside an old sewage tank. Only 50 records of burials at Tuam are extant. The Irish government formally apologised in January 2021.

== The Netherlands ==
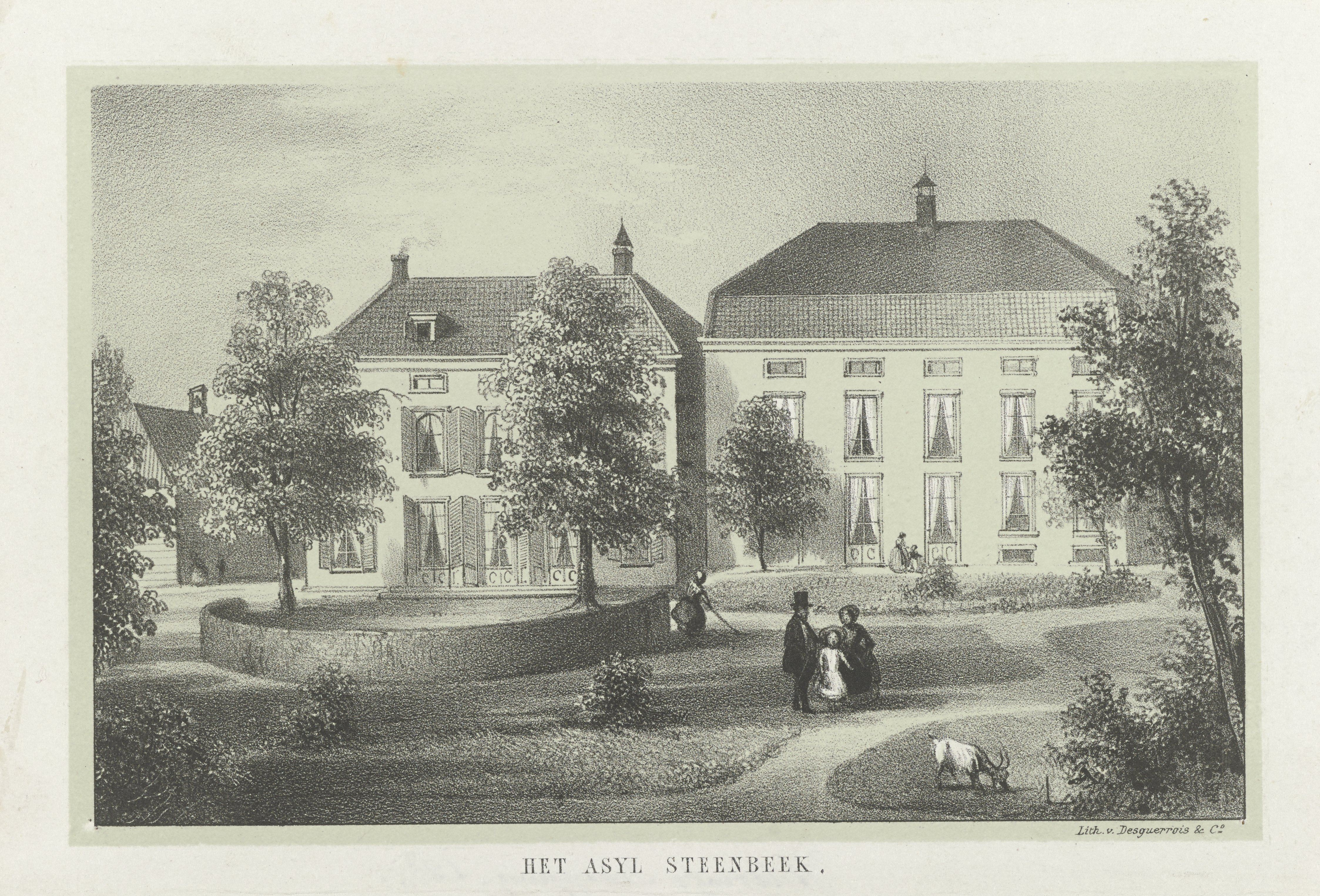
Asyl Steenbeek in 1848

In 1847 the Dutch philanthropist Ottho Gerhard Heldring established Asyl Steenbeek, the first home of its kind in the Netherlands, where prostitutes with newborn babies were cared for and re-educated on religious principles.

The link between unmarried mothers and sin underlined the care given for them in the Netherlands until the 1960s. The homes there were referred to as doorgangshuizen ('transit homes'). From 1947, full parental rights could be awarded to unmarried mothers, in place of her child being placed in the care of her religious denomination and, after a few months, placed in a children’s home, as could the single mother if she was herself a child. During the 1950s it became quite possible that children could be fostered rather than placed in a care home. It was more likely that fostering would make them better off than those that lived "in one of the many crowded children’s homes under an authoritarian and often harsh regime, led by badly educated, and sometimes violent or abusive child care workers".

From the 1930s onwards the societies that ran the majority of Dutch Mother and Baby Homes were encouraging pregnant women to care their babies. From the mid-1950s unmarried women were treated as psychiatric cases. Adoption was made legal in 1956, causing mothers to give over their children as a result of professional intervention. A decade later, single mothers were becoming more generally accepted, and Mother and Baby Homes began to be closed down. Thousands of mothers and their children had passed through Mother and Baby Homes.

== Belgium ==
In Belgium, several maternity homes for unmarried pregnant women were operated during the 20th century, many of them run by Roman Catholic religious orders. One of the most well-known institutions is Tamar, located in Lommel, in the province of Limburg. Tamar was founded in 1970 by the Sisters of the Infant Jesus (Zusters Kindsheid Jesu) and remained in operation until 2014.

Although Tamar was officially presented as a shelter providing care and guidance to young, unmarried mothers, former residents and adoptees have later alleged that the institution was involved in forced and coercive adoption practices. According to testimonies, young women were isolated from their families, placed under strict supervision by nuns, and pressured or compelled to relinquish their children for adoption, often without informed or freely given consent.

Allegations also include physical and psychological abuse, confinement, and cases of sexual abuse, as well as reports of forced sterilizations. These experiences have been documented in Belgian media, notably in the investigative podcast Children of the Church (Kinderen van de kerk) and the documentary series The Nuns (De Nonnen), which examined abuse and adoption practices within Catholic institutions, including Tamar.

One adoptee, identified as Peter in The Nuns, reported that he filed a criminal complaint regarding his own alleged abduction and forced adoption originating from Tamar. Belgian judicial authorities later dismissed the case on the grounds of statute of limitations, preventing further prosecution. The case has been cited in public debates on accountability and historical injustice related to maternity homes in Belgium.

== See also ==
- Baby Scoop Era

== Sources ==
- Bakker, Nelleke (2021). "Mother and Baby Homes in the Netherlands in the 20th century: Report for the Irish Commission of Investigation: Mother and Baby Homes and Certain Related Matters (Order 2015)" (PDF). Final Report for the Irish Commission of Investigation into Mother and Baby Homes Irish Commission of Investigation.
- Clark, Gillian (2008). "The Role of Mother and Baby Homes in the Adoption of Children Born Outside Marriage in Twentieth-Century England and Wales". Family & Community History. 11 (1). Taylor & Francis: 45–59. doi:10.1179/175138108X293093. ISSN 1463-1180.
- McCarthy, Rebecca Lea (2010). Origins of the Magdalene Laundries: An Analytical History. McFarland. ISBN 9780786455805.
- Nicholson, Jill (1968). Mother and Baby Homes: A Survey of Homes for Unmarried Mothers. Taylor & Francis. ISBN 9781000438192.
- Pochin, Jean (1969). Without a Wedding-ring: Casework with Unmarried Parents. New York: Schocken Books. OCLC 654759829.
- Robinson, Jane (2016). In the Family Way: Illegitimacy Between the Great War and the Swinging Sixties. London: Penguin Books. ISBN 9780241962916.
