= Witchcraft for Wayward Girls =

2025 novel by Grady Hendrix

- First edition cover
- Author: Grady Hendrix
- Language: English
- Genres: Horror
- Publisher: Berkley Books
- Publication date: January 14, 2025
- Publication place: United States
- Media type: Hardcover
- Pages: 496
- ISBN: 978-0-593-54898-1

Witchcraft for Wayward Girls is a 2025 horror novel by American writer Grady Hendrix. It was first published in January 2025 in the United States by Berkley Books, an imprint of Penguin Random House, and in the United Kingdom by Tor Books. The novel is set in Florida in 1970, and is about a group of pregnant teenage girls living in a maternity home for unwed girls who discover a book on witchcraft.

== Plot summary ==
It is 1970 in the American South and fifteen-year-old Neva is unwed and pregnant. Her parents are horrified, and to avoid a scandal, her father drives her from Alabama to Wellwood House in St. Augustine, Florida. Wellwood is a maternity home for unwed pregnant girls whose families want them hidden from society. There they are kept against their will until they give birth. The babies are taken away from them to be put up for adoption, and only then are the girls allowed to return home and resume their lives as if nothing untoward had happened.

All the girls in the Home are given new names to sever connections to their lives back home. Neva's new name is Fern, and she becomes friends with three other pregnant teenage girls, Rose, Zinnia and Holly. Each has their own story to tell about how they became pregnant. Holly, who has only just turned fourteen, was raped by the family minister, the Reverend Jerry, who wants to adopt her baby when she returns home.

Life in the Home is humiliating and degrading for the girls. They are maligned by the Home's mistress, Miss Wellwood, and belittled by its resident doctor. One day, a bookmobile arrives at the Home, and Fern looks for a book to read. The librarian, Miss Parcae helps Fern by giving her How to Be a Groovy Witch. For fun, the four girls start trying out some of the spells in the book, and are surprised to find they work. They decide they need a spell to prevent Holly from going home and Reverend Jerry taking her baby. The girls discover that Miss Parcae is a witch and appeal to her for help, but they soon learn that there is a price to pay for practising witchcraft.

== Background ==
Hendrix said in an interview with Paste magazine that two of his relatives were sent to one of those maternity homes when they were pregnant teenagers. It was not until they were in their 70s that the son of one of the women, looking for his birth mother, found her. This prompted the women to finally talk about what had happened to them all those years ago. Hendrix had never heard about those homes and was outraged that society could have done that to those girls. Looking for more information, he said he read Ann Fessler's book, The Girls Who Went Away, and found it "really powerful". He remarked:

It’s these teenage girls locked up in the middle of nowhere. No one knows where they are. They have no power. They don’t know what’s going to happen to them. No one will tell them. They don’t even know each other’s real names. The only people they can rely on are each other.

Hendrix realized that this was a potential folk horror setting for a story about those homes. He said he had studied witchcraft literature at university and was familiar with the topic, but he wanted to use folk magic in the story, in particular Appalachian folk magic, He wanted it to be something his characters could relate to. When questioned about how he approached using female protagonists in the novel, Hendrix said he spoke to many mothers and read extensively about girls' experiences in those homes. He explained that he had "gained so much respect" for those teenagers, and "was desperate not to screw it up".

Speaking on National Public Radio, Hendrix discussed where the "real evil" in Witchcraft for Wayward Girls is. He said the witches are frightening, but they offer "knowledge and liberation". The people in charge of those homes can be seen as cruel, but they believe they are helping the teenagers. And the pregnant girls are not evil, as many of them were raped or molested or simply had no access to birth control. Hendrix stated that this is "one of those stories where there isn't a villain."

== Critical reception ==
Witchcraft for Wayward Girls was generally well received by critics.

In a review in The New York Times Book Review, American historian and writer Hugh Ryan described Witchcraft for Wayward Girls as "frightening ... infuriating, beautiful and sad", and "a perfect horror for our imperfect age". He praised Hendrix for his "complex, human scale emotional arcs" and his well-developed characters. Ryan stated that Hendrix's "superb new novel" highlights society's "wild abhorrence of [wayward] young women" and the "mistreatment" of unwed pregnant girls.

Maren Longbella wrote in the Minnesota Star Tribune that one of Hendrix's strengths is his ability to mix the "tropes of terror" in ways that "exceed the sum of their parts". While for some, childbirth can be "a beautiful thing", Hendrix shows that it is "pretty gross" and "scary as heck". Longbella was impressed how Hendrix used history and the notion of witches to highlight "the hypocrisy of how unwed mothers have been treated".

In a review in SFFWorld, Rob H. Bedford wrote that Witchcraft for Wayward Girls has strong characters, an "easy-going prose", and a captivating narrative. He opined that just as Hendrix's previous novel, How to Sell a Haunted House was one of the best horror novels of 2023, "it will take an impressive novel to topple" Witchcraft for Wayward Girls from 2025's list. Bedford stated that "the most horrific element of this powerful, poignant ... novel" is the way it mirrors society's "unspeakable attitudes towards women, their value, their feelings [and] their simple personhood".

Stephen Rosenberg was a little more critical of the book. In a review at Horror Geek Life, he said that while Hendrix's stories are often written from a female point of view, he questioned how Hendrix could fully understand what pregnant teenage girls must feel and go through, adding that it sometimes felt "inaccurate and overstepping". Rosenberg remarked that Witchcraft for Wayward Girls' writing is "extremely solid" and the main characters are all "well-developed". He described the pregnancy horror segments, in particular the lengthy birthing scenes, as "absolutely brutal". But he felt that not enough time was spent on the story's supernatural and witchcraft horror. Rosenberg stated that while Hendrix is a "brilliant" horror writer, these aspects of the story lacked consistency and follow-up.

== See also ==
- Baby Scoop Era
- The Girls Who Went Away
- A Girl Like Her
- The Girls of Huntington House
