= Baby Scoop Era =

Period in anglosphere history

The Baby Scoop Era was a period in anglosphere history starting after the end of World War II and ending in the early 1970s, characterized by an increasing rate of pre-marital pregnancies over the preceding period, along with a higher rate of newborn adoption.

== In the United States ==
=== Background ===
Before World War 2, an unmarried pregnant woman would have been sent to a maternity home, usually run by evangelical Christian women, where she would have assistance in raising her baby if she chose to keep it. Most homes encouraged women to keep their babies, with some requiring women to keep their babies for at least six months before relinquishing them for adoption.

Maternity homes provided training for women in order for them to find jobs to support themselves and their children.Childcare centers are thought to have originated from maternity homes, when children would be taken care of in the home while the new mother worked. Some maternity homes also had postnatal programs, where women and their babies would live independently, be provided with money, food, and clothing, and receive regular visits from maternity home workers. In other situations, mothers and babies would be sent to live in the homes of married women who would help them take care of their babies and provide assistance with securing jobs and homes.

Beginning in the mid-1940s, the missions of maternity homes began to change and required that women give up their babies for adoption. Furthermore, illegitimacy began to be defined in terms of psychological deficits on the part of the mother. At the same time, a liberalization of sexual morals combined with restrictions on access to birth control led to an increase in premarital pregnancies. The practice of social work also shifted from viewing unwed pregnant women as people in need of help and guidance to viewing them as "sexually delinquent" and separating them from their infants as a form of punishment. These practices were widely questioned by mental health professionals. Although many families who adopted children in this era were told that their mothers had surrendered them voluntarily, that was not always the case. Usually, mothers were told that their only option was to surrender their children and very little effort was made to keep families together. In some situations, women who wanted to keep their babies were told by maternity homes that in order to keep their babies, the woman would have to pay for her housing and hospital costs. A lack of financial and familial support was another major reason why most women surrendered their babies.

=== 1945-1973 ===
It is estimated that from 1945 to 1973, between 1.5 and 2 million babies were surrendered for adoption in the United States. At the same time, it is estimated that up to 4 million parents in the United States had children placed for adoption, with 2 million during the 1960s alone. Adoption rates in the United States were at an all time high in the years after World War 2 and increased steadily before peaking at 170,000 babies in 1970. There was an 80% increase in adoption after the war.In contrast, the U.S. Department of Health and Human Services estimates that only 14,000 infants were placed for adoption in 2003.

Annual numbers for non-relative adoptions increased from an estimated 33,800 in 1951 to a peak of 89,200 in 1970, then quickly declined to an estimated 47,700 in 1975.In 1971, over half of babies surrendered for adoption in the U.S. were adopted by people who were unrelated to them.

During the 1950s, 39% of unmarried women under the age of 20 had been intimate with their partners, with the number rising to 68% by 1973. Nonmarital births also increased after the war, with an estimated 10% of all births being out of wedlock in 1965. The rise in unwed women becoming pregnant has been attributed to multiple factors, including the sexual revolution, changes in dating behavior that resulted in rising privacy and independence among young people, and changes to abortion laws that made it harder for women to access safe abortions.

There were multiple social pressures that led to this trend. Women who had no control over their reproductive lives were defined by psychological theory as "not-mothers", and because they had no control over their reproductive lives, they were subject to the ideology of those who watched over them. As such, for unmarried pregnant girls and women in the pre-Roe era, the main chance for attaining home and marriage rested on their acknowledging their alleged shame and guilt, and this required relinquishing their children, with more than 80% of unwed mothers in maternity homes acting in essence as "breeders" for adoptive parents. From 1960 to 1970, 27% of all births to married women between the ages of 15 and 29 were conceived premaritally. This problem was thought to be caused by female neurosis, and those who could not procure an abortion, legally or otherwise, were encouraged to put up their children for adoption.

There were also multiple differences in the treatment of white unwed mothers and Black mothers in this era. Compared to the white community, the Black community in this era was much more willing to accommodate unwed mothers, with an estimated 9 out of 10 Black women keeping their babies. Furthermore, most maternity homes would not accept Black women and their infants were characterized as "less adoptable". The low rate of surrender among Black women was also based on the history of Black families being involuntarily separated.

=== Post 1973 ===
Infant adoptions began declining in the early 1970s, a decline often attributed to the decreasing birth rate, but which also partially resulted from social and legal changes that enabled middle-class mothers to have an alternative: single motherhood.

The decline in the fertility rate is associated with the introduction of the pill in 1960, the completion of legalization of artificial birth control methods, the introduction of federal funding to make family planning services more available to the young and low income, and the legalization of abortion, though some estimate that over 1 million abortions occurred annually during the baby scoop era, compared to 40 to 60 thousand annual adoptions.

Some scholars think of the decline in newborn adoptions as reflecting a freedom of choice embraced by youth and the women's movement of the 1960s and 1970s, resulting in an increase in the number of unmarried mothers who parented their babies as opposed to having them taken for adoption purposes. One statistic finds that in 1970, around 80% of newborns born to unmarried women were surrendered for adoption, but had dropped to around 4% by 1983.

In contrast to numbers in the 1960s and 1970s, from 1989 to 1995 fewer than 1% of children born to never-married women were surrendered for adoption.

== In the Commonwealth ==
A similar social development took place in the United Kingdom, New Zealand, Australia, and Canada.

=== In Canada ===
Canada's "Baby Scoop Era" refers to the postwar period from 1945 to 1988, when over 400,000 unmarried pregnant girls, mostly aged 15–19, were targeted for their yet-to-be-born infants, because they were unmarried with a child. A large number of these young women were housed in maternity group homes, which were managed by religious orders, such as the Salvation Army, the Catholic Church, the United Church and the Anglican Church etc. These maternity "homes" were heavily funded by the Canadian government. There were over 70 maternity homes in Canada which housed between 20 and 200 pregnant women at a time. In Canadian maternity "homes" and hospitals, up to 100% of newborns were removed from their legal mothers after birth and placed for adoption. These newborns were taken under a Health and Welfare protocol.

Some professionals of the era considered that the punishment of the mother for her transgression was an important part of the process. Dr. Marion Hilliard of Women's College Hospital was quoted in 1956 saying:

The father plays absolutely no part in this. That is part of her rehabilitation. When she renounces her child for its own good, the unwed mother has learned a lot. She has learned an important human value. She has learned to pay the price of her misdemeanor, and this alone, if punishment is needed, is punishment enough...We must go back to a primary set of values and the discipline that starts with the very small child.

The term Baby Scoop Era parallels the term Sixties Scoop, which was coined by Patrick Johnston, author of Native Children and the Child Welfare System. "Sixties Scoop" refers to the Canadian practice, beginning in the 1950s and continuing until the late 1980s, of apprehending unusually high numbers of Native children over the age of 5 years old from their families and fostering or adopting them out.

=== In Australia ===
A similar event happened in Australia where Aboriginal children, sometimes referred to as the Stolen Generation, were removed from their families and placed into internment camps, orphanages and other institutions. Similar policies of forced adoption towards the children of unmarried mothers of European descent (known as the "White Stolen Generations" to distinguish them from the Aboriginal children), occurred as well. It is generally understood that a decline of adoption during the 1970s was linked to a 1973 law providing for financial assistance to single parents.

== In popular usage ==
In popular usage, singer Celeste Billhartz uses the term "baby scoop era" on her website to refer to the era covered by her work "The Mothers Project." A letter on Senator Bill Finch's website uses the term as well. Writer Betty Mandell references the term in her article "Adoption". The term was also used in a 2004 edition of the Richmond Times-Dispatch.

== In other media ==
- 1995: The Other Mother: A Moment of Truth Movie, a television film based on the autobiographical book by Carol Schaefer, directed by Bethany Rooney, and written by Steven Loring
- 2000: Wake Up Little Susie: Single Pregnancy and Race Before Roe v. Wade, a book by historian Rickie Solinger.
- 2001: Beggars And Choosers: How The Politics Of Choice Shapes Adoption, Abortion And Welfare In The U.S., a book written by Rickie Solinger.
- 2002: The Magdalene Sisters, a British-Irish drama film directed and written by Peter Mullan
- 2005: Gone To A Good Home, an Australian documentary film produced by Film Australia National Interest Program in association with Big Island Pictures, the Pacific Film, Television Commission, and SBS Independent
- 2006: The Girls Who Went Away, a book by Ann Fessler which contains accounts of women whose babies were adopted in the 1950s and 1960s.
- 2012: A Girl Like Her, an American documentary film directed by Ann Fessler
- 2013: Philomena, a drama film directed by Stephen Frears and based on Martin Sixsmith's 2009 book The Lost Child of Philomena Lee, which recounts the eponymous Philomena Lee's search for her son, Michael A. Hess, who was placed for adoption without her consent
- 2014: Not Fade Away: My Time in the 60's with Brian Jones of the Rolling Stones and the Heartbreak of Forced Adoption, a book by Dawn Molloy who had to give up her son with Rolling Stones founder Brian Jones against her will.
- 2016: The Best Thing, a British mime play written by Rachael Savage, produced by Vamos Theatre, and inspired by a 2013 The Guardian article on the Baby Scoop Era. The title of the play comes from a phrase told to the single mothers that giving up their illegitimate children to be adopted by married couples was "the best thing" to do.
- 2019: Girls Like Us, a young adult novel by Randi Pink. The novel is set in 1972, and follows the perspectives of multiple girls who were sent away to give birth to their children that were conceived outside of marriage.
- 2024: The Girls We Sent Away, a historical fiction novel by Meagan Church. The novel is about a teenager in the 1960s who is sent to a maternity home.

== See also ==
- Michael A. Hess
- Vincent Nichols § Acknowledgement of adoption controversy
