= Forced adoption of children through the Catholic Church in Belgium =

The forced adoption of children through the Catholic Church in Belgium affected young pregnant women sent by their families to give birth in Catholic institutions, who had their children taken from them and then sold to families of reception. The number of affected children was approximately 30,000, between 1945 and 1980.

The Belgian Catholic Church apologized to the victims and the priests involved in this matter were suspended. Tommy Scholtès, spokesman for the Belgian bishops, declared in 2023 that it was not about the sale of children, but rather the families who received the children "contributed financially to the functioning of the religious communities".

== History ==
The issue of forced adoptions of children between 1945 and 1980 in Belgium came to light in 2014. After debates in the Flemish Parliament, apologies from the Belgian Catholic Church and requests investigation, the matter disappeared from the media. The case returned to the public spotlight on the Belgian scene in December 2023 with the podcast Kinderen van de kerk (Children of the Church), published by the media Het Laatste Nieuws.

According to the Mater Matuta association, 30,000 children, particularly in Flanders were affected by these abandonments and forced adoptions. After giving birth in Catholic institutions, in Belgium or northern France, biological mothers had to abandon their children, who were then sold to adoptive families. It was generally sold to children for between 10000 and 30000 Belgian francs. However, they could have been larger amounts, since there is the case of a child born in the north of France sold by the nuns for the value of 100000 francs.

Women victims of these forced adoptions created the association Mater Matuta. According to this association, public services and certain magistrates became accomplices of the Catholic Church. Mater Matuta claims that adoption agencies exchanged children to prevent them from finding their biological mothers. Some of the victims speak of humiliation and sexual violence by the nuns, as well as forced sterilizations.

There were also numerous instances of abuse in Belgian mother-and-child homes, such as the notorious Tamar home in the Belgian city of Lommel. In this institution, children were taken from their mothers against their will and given up for adoption in exchange for donations, a practice that commodified human life. Furthermore, girls were sterilized against their will and girls were subjected to forced labor in a local carpet factory.

=== Documentary and Recent Developments ===
In 2025 the Flemish commercial broadcaster VTM aired a four‑part documentary series titled De Nonnen (The Nuns), directed by Borgerhoff & Lamberigts, which investigates abuse and misconduct by Catholic nuns in Flanders, including episodes focused on physical and sexual violence, the forced separation of mothers and children, and coercive adoptive practices in institutions such as the Moederhuis Tamar in Lommel.

The series brought renewed attention to historical allegations of coerced and deceptive adoptions by religious orders. In some cases, young women were pressured or manoeuvred into relinquishing their newborns, who were then placed for adoption without consent. Victims and adopted persons featured in the documentary recount long‑suppressed trauma and the impact of these practices on their lives.

A significant personal account highlighted in the coverage is that of a adoptee, Peter, who discovered that he had been adopted in the begin 1980s without his biological mother's consent. In the documentary De Nonnen, Peter is shown filing a formal police complaint in the Belgian city Lommel, alleging that he had been unlawfully taken from his biological mother, effectively an official report of his own abduction. This complaint focuses on the forced nature of his adoption and the role of the nuns and adoption agencies in misleading his mother. Prosecutors, however, have indicated that the alleged offences are time‑barred and will not be further investigated.

Peter's case is notable as first instance in which an adoptee has publicly sought legal recognition of coercive adoption practices tied to Catholic institutions, reflecting broader calls from survivors for historical truth, institutional accountability, and formal acknowledgement.
