= List of accolades received by Philomena =

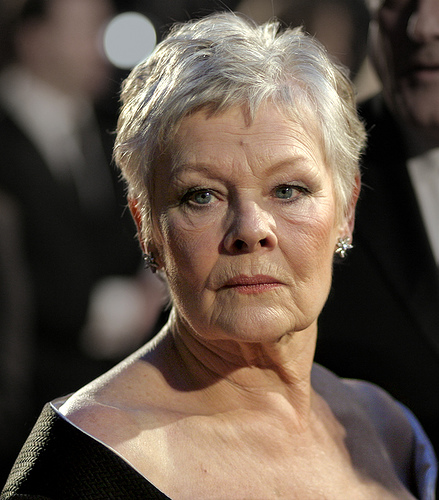
- Judi Dench has been nominated for 25 awards for her portrayal of the title character in Philomena
Awards & nominations
Award	Won	Nominated
AACTA Awards	0	1
AARP Annual Movies for Grownups Awards	1	1
Academy Awards	0	4
Alliance of Women Film Journalists	0	3
British Academy Film Awards	1	4
British Independent Film Awards	0	4
Broadcast Film Critics Association	0	2
Chicago Film Critics Association	0	1
Costume Designers Guild Awards	0	1
Dallas–Fort Worth Film Critics Association	0	1
Dorian Awards	0	2
European Film Awards	0	1
Florida Film Critics Circle	0	1
GLAAD Media Awards	1	1
Golden Globe Awards	0	3
Hamptons International Film Festival	1	1
Houston Film Critics Society	0	1
Irish Film & Television Awards	2	2
Location Managers Guild of America	0	1
London Film Critics' Circle	1	5
New York Film Critics Online	0	1
San Francisco Film Critics Circle	0	2
Satellite Awards	1	4
Screen Actors Guild Awards	0	1
Screenwriters' Choice Awards	0	1
St. Louis Film Critics Association	0	2
Toronto International Film Festival	1	1
USC Scripter Award	0	1
Venice Film Festival	9	10
Virginia Film Festival	1	1
Washington D.C. Area Film Critics	0	2
Women Film Critics Circle	3	3
- Total number of wins and nominations
Totals	22	69
- References

Philomena is a 2013 British comedy-drama film directed by Stephen Frears. Steve Coogan and Jeff Pope adapted the screenplay from The Lost Child of Philomena Lee by Martin Sixsmith. The film focuses on Philomena Lee's (Judi Dench) 50-year-long search for the son she was forced to give up for adoption. It was screened in the main competition section at the 70th Venice International Film Festival, where it competed for the Golden Lion. Philomena was released in the United Kingdom by The Weinstein Company on 1 November 2013. As of March 2014, the film has earned over £86 million in its combined total gross at the box office.

The film gathered various awards and nominations following its release, ranging from recognition of the film itself to Coogan and Pope's screenplay, and Dench's acting performance. Philomena earned four nominations from the 86th Academy Awards and the 67th British Academy Film Awards respectively. Dench was nominated for two awards from the Alliance of Women Film Journalists, while Coogan and Pope received a nomination for Best Adapted Screenplay. Philomena received four nominations from the British Independent Film Awards, with Coogan and Dench nominated in the Best Actor and Best Actress categories. Consolata Boyle received a nomination for Excellence in Contemporary Film from the Costume Designers Guild for her work on the film. Dench gathered further Best Actress nominations from the Broadcast Film Critics Association, Dallas–Fort Worth Film Critics Association and Florida Film Critics Circle.

At the 71st Golden Globe Awards, Philomena was nominated in the Best Drama Motion Picture category, while Dench was nominated for Best Actress and Coogan and Pope nominated for Best Screenplay. Frears collected the Best Narrative Feature award at the Hamptons International Film Festival. The film has been nominated for five London Film Critics' Circle awards and four Satellite Awards, including Best Film and Best Original Score for Alexandre Desplat. As well as being nominated for the Golden Lion, Philomena collected nine awards at the Venice Film Festival ranging from Best Screenplay to the Queer Lion and the SIGNIS Award. At the Toronto and Virginia Film Festivals, Philomena won the People's Choice Award First Runner Up and Best Narrative Feature respectively. The film's screenplay is nominated for the USC Scripter Award, while the Women Film Critics Circle awarded the picture three accolades including Best Female Images in a Movie.

== Awards and nominations ==
Award	Date of ceremony	Category	Recipients and nominees	Result
AACTA Awards	10 January 2014	International Award for Best Actress	Judi Dench	Nominated
AARP Annual Movies for Grownups Awards	6 January 2014	Best Actress	Judi Dench	Won
Academy Awards	2 March 2014	Best Picture	Gabrielle Tana, Steve Coogan and Tracey Seaward	Nominated
Academy Awards	2 March 2014	Best Actress	Judi Dench	Nominated
Academy Awards	2 March 2014	Best Adapted Screenplay	Steve Coogan and Jeff Pope	Nominated
Academy Awards	2 March 2014	Best Original Score	Alexandre Desplat	Nominated
Alliance of Women Film Journalists	19 December 2013	Actress Defying Age and Agism	Judi Dench	Nominated
Alliance of Women Film Journalists	19 December 2013	Best Actress	Judi Dench	Nominated
Alliance of Women Film Journalists	19 December 2013	Best Adapted Screenplay	Steve Coogan and Jeff Pope	Nominated
British Academy Film Awards	16 February 2014	Best Actress in a Leading Role	Judi Dench	Nominated
British Academy Film Awards	16 February 2014	Best Adapted Screenplay	Steve Coogan and Jeff Pope	Won
British Academy Film Awards	16 February 2014	Best Film	Philomena	Nominated
British Academy Film Awards	16 February 2014	Outstanding British Film	Philomena	Nominated
British Independent Film Awards	8 December 2013	Best Actor	Steve Coogan	Nominated
British Independent Film Awards	8 December 2013	Best Actress	Judi Dench	Nominated
British Independent Film Awards	8 December 2013	Best British Independent Film	Philomena	Nominated
British Independent Film Awards	8 December 2013	Best Screenplay	Steve Coogan and Jeff Pope	Nominated
Broadcast Film Critics Association	16 January 2014	Best Actress	Judi Dench	Nominated
Broadcast Film Critics Association	16 January 2014	Best Adapted Screenplay	Steve Coogan and Jeff Pope	Nominated
Chicago Film Critics Association	16 December 2013	Best Adapted Screenplay	Steve Coogan and Jeff Pope	Nominated
Costume Designers Guild Awards	22 February 2014	Excellence in Contemporary Film	Consolata Boyle	Nominated
Dallas–Fort Worth Film Critics Association	16 December 2013	Best Actress	Judi Dench	Nominated
Dorian Awards	21 January 2014	Film Actress Performance of the Year	Judi Dench	Nominated
Dorian Awards	21 January 2014	LGBT Film of the Year	Philomena	Nominated
European Film Awards	13 December 2014	People's Choice Award for Best European Film	Philomena	Nominated
Florida Film Critics Circle	18 December 2013	Best Actress	Judi Dench	Nominated
GLAAD Media Awards	3 May 2014	Outstanding Wide Release Film	Philomena	Won
Golden Globe Awards	12 January 2014	Best Actress in a Drama Motion Picture	Judi Dench	Nominated
Golden Globe Awards	12 January 2014	Best Drama Motion Picture	Philomena	Nominated
Golden Globe Awards	12 January 2014	Best Screenplay	Steve Coogan and Jeff Pope	Nominated
Hamptons International Film Festival	14 October 2013	Best Narrative Feature	Stephen Frears	Won
Houston Film Critics Society	15 December 2013	Best Actress	Judi Dench	Nominated
Irish Film & Television Awards	5 April 2014	Best International Actress	Judi Dench	Won
Irish Film & Television Awards	5 April 2014	Best International Film	Philomena	Won
Location Managers Guild of America	29 March 2014	Outstanding Location Feature Film	Philomena	Nominated
London Film Critics' Circle	2 February 2014	Actress of the Year	Judi Dench	Nominated
London Film Critics' Circle	2 February 2014	British Actor of the Year	Steve Coogan	Nominated
London Film Critics' Circle	2 February 2014	British Actress of the Year	Judi Dench	Won
London Film Critics' Circle	2 February 2014	British Film of the Year	Philomena	Nominated
London Film Critics' Circle	2 February 2014	Screenwriter of the Year	Steve Coogan and Jeff Pope	Nominated
New York Film Critics Online	8 December 2013	Best Picture	Philomena	Nominated
San Francisco Film Critics Circle	15 December 2013	Best Actress	Judi Dench	Nominated
San Francisco Film Critics Circle	15 December 2013	Best Adapted Screenplay	Steve Coogan and Jeff Pope	Nominated
Satellite Awards	23 February 2014	Best Actress in a Motion Picture	Judi Dench	Nominated
Satellite Awards	23 February 2014	Best Adapted Screenplay	Steve Coogan and Jeff Pope	Won
Satellite Awards	23 February 2014	Best Film	Philomena	Nominated
Satellite Awards	23 February 2014	Best Original Score	Alexandre Desplat	Nominated
Screen Actors Guild Awards	18 January 2014	Best Female Actor in a Leading Role	Judi Dench	Nominated
Screenwriters' Choice Awards	7 January 2014	Best Adapted Screenplay	Steve Coogan and Jeff Pope	Nominated
St. Louis Film Critics Association	14 December 2013	Best Actress	Judi Dench	Nominated
St. Louis Film Critics Association	14 December 2013	Best Adapted Screenplay	Steve Coogan and Jeff Pope	Nominated
Toronto International Film Festival	17 November 2013	People's Choice Award First Runner Up	Stephen Frears	Won
USC Scripter Award	8 February 2014	Best Adapted Screenplay	Martin Sixsmith, Steve Coogan and Jeff Pope	Nominated
Venice Film Festival	7 September 2013	Best Screenplay	Steve Coogan and Jeff Pope	Won
Venice Film Festival	7 September 2013	Brian Award	Philomena	Won
Venice Film Festival	7 September 2013	Cinema for UNICEF	Philomena	Won
Venice Film Festival	7 September 2013	INTERFILM Award	Philomena	Won
Venice Film Festival	7 September 2013	Golden Lion	Philomena	Nominated
Venice Film Festival	7 September 2013	Golden Mouse	Philomena	Won
Venice Film Festival	7 September 2013	P. Nazareno Taddei Award	Philomena	Won
Venice Film Festival	7 September 2013	Queer Lion	Philomena	Won
Venice Film Festival	7 September 2013	SIGNIS Award	Philomena	Won
Venice Film Festival	7 September 2013	Vittorio Veneto Film Festival Award	Philomena	Won
Virginia Film Festival	20 November 2013	Best Narrative Feature	Philomena	Won
Washington D.C. Area Film Critics Association	9 December 2013	Best Actress	Judi Dench	Nominated
Washington D.C. Area Film Critics Association	9 December 2013	Best Portrayal of Washington, D.C.	Philomena	Nominated
Women Film Critics Circle	16 December 2013	Best Actress	Judi Dench	Won
Women Film Critics Circle	16 December 2013	Best Female Images in a Movie	Philomena	Won
Women Film Critics Circle	16 December 2013	Best Movie About Women	Philomena	Won
