= Rik Devillé =

- Born: 6 May 1944 (age 82); Halle, Belgium
- Occupations: Catholic priest, author
- Known for: Advocacy for victims of abuse and forced adoptions within the Catholic Church

Rik Devillé (born 1944) is a Belgian Catholic priest, author, and human-rights activist. He is widely known for his work exposing sexual abuse, institutional cover-ups, and forced adoption practices within the Catholic Church in Belgium. Since his retirement from active ministry, Devillé has collected and documented thousands of testimonies from victims and has become a prominent public voice in debates on accountability, justice, and reform within the Church.

== Early life and priesthood ==
Rik Devillé was born in 1944 in Halle, Flemish Brabant, Belgium. He studied theology at the Grand Seminary of Mechelen and was ordained as a Catholic priest in 1969. He served as a parish priest in Buizingen and Lot and worked for thirteen years as a religion teacher at the Heilig-Hartinstituut in Halle.

== Church reform and human-rights advocacy ==
From the 1980s onward, Devillé became involved in movements advocating structural reform within the Catholic Church. He founded the Flemish working group 'Mensenrechten in de Kerk' (Human Rights in the Church) .

== Work on clerical abuse ==
After retiring from parish ministry in 2009, Devillé focused full-time on supporting victims of sexual abuse committed by clergy and religious personnel. He gathered testimonies from thousands of survivors and publicly criticised the Catholic Church for what he described as systemic concealment, minimisation of abuse, and prioritisation of institutional reputation over victims’ rights.

Devillé played a significant public role following the resignation of Bishop Roger Vangheluwe in 2010 after revelations of sexual abuse. His work contributed to public debate and parliamentary inquiries into historical abuse cases in Belgium.

== Advocacy against forced adoptions ==
In addition to sexual abuse, Devillé has been a central figure in uncovering the history of forced adoptions involving children born to unmarried mothers in Catholic institutions. He documented testimonies from women who were pressured or coerced into relinquishing their children and from adoptees who were separated from their biological families without informed consent.

== Media productions ==
Rik Devillé’s work with victims of abuse and forced adoptions has been featured in several major media productions, which brought these issues to a wider public audience in Belgium.

- De nonnen (The Nuns) – a television documentary examining abuse, exploitation, and coercion within convents and religious institutions, including the role of nuns in systems that enabled sexual abuse and the forced separation of mothers and children.
- Kinderen van de kerk (Children of the Church) – an investigative podcast series focusing on children taken from their mothers under church authority, addressing forced adoptions, secrecy, and the long-term impact on both mothers and adoptees .
- Godvergeten (God Forgotten) – a television documentary series broadcast by the Flemish public broadcaster VRT, largely based on testimonies collected by Devillé. The series exposed widespread sexual abuse within the Catholic Church in Belgium and reignited public debate, leading to renewed political attention and parliamentary hearings.

These productions significantly contributed to public awareness of historical abuses within Catholic institutions and reinforced calls for accountability, access to archives, and reparations for victims.

Devillé has argued that these practices constituted serious violations of human rights and has called for official recognition, access to church archives, and reparations for those affected.

== Publications ==
Devillé has authored several books combining theological critique with documentation of victim testimonies:

- De laatste dictatuur (1992) – A critique of authoritarian structures within the Catholic Church.
- In naam van de Vader (2019) – Testimonies of victims of sexual abuse in the Church.
- Donkere gangen (2023) – An investigation into abuse, coercion, and forced adoptions in monasteries and convents.

== Recognition ==
In 2023, the Belgian magazine Knack named Devillé Person of the Year, citing his sustained efforts to amplify victims’ voices and confront institutional responsibility.

== Legacy ==
Rik Devillé is regarded as a key figure in Belgium's public reckoning with historical abuses within the Catholic Church. Supporters describe him as a tireless advocate for victims and transparency, while critics within church circles have accused him of polarisation. His work continues to influence debates on justice, memory, and institutional accountability.
