= A Girl Like Her =

A Girl Like Her may refer to:

- A Girl Like Her (2012 film), an American documentary film by Ann Fessler
- A Girl Like Her (2015 film), an American drama film directed by Amy S. Weber
