= Albert Littlefield =

Dr. Albert Littlefield was the first professional abortion provider in Portland, Oregon. Dr. Edgar Stewart inherited his practice, which he closed in the 1940s in favor of Ruth Barnett.
