= Godvergeten =

- Genre: Documentary
- Directed by: Ibbe Daniëls
- Country of origin: Belgium
- Original language: Dutch
- No. of episodes: 4

Production
- Producer: De Mensen
- Editor: Ingrid Schildermans

Original release
- Release: September 5, 2023

Godvergeten (Dutch for Godforsaken) is a Belgian four-part documentary series that explores decades of sexual abuse by Catholic priests and clergy in Flanders, told through the testimonies of survivors and their families. The series, directed by Ingrid Schildermans and Ibbe Daniëls and produced by De Mensen, premiered in September 2023 on VRT Canvas. The main expert featured in the series is priest Rik Devillé, founder of Mensenrechten in de Kerk.

== Overview ==
The series presents the experiences of approximately twenty Belgian men and women who were abused by priests or members of the clergy during their childhood. Survivors speak of prolonged mental and physical abuse, the shame and silence that followed, and the institutional cover-ups that followed. The first two episodes focus on personal trauma and family responses, while subsequent episodes examine the judicial response to abuse—especially "Operatie Kelk" (Operation Chalice)—and the prolonged struggle for justice.

== Episodes ==
1. Personal testimonies: the beginning and long-lasting impacts of abuse.
2. Family perspective: how parents and relatives coped with discovering the abuse.
3. Operatie Kelk: the high-profile police raids and the judicial aftermath.
4. Legal deadlock and the survivors' final appeals, including appeals lodged with the Pope and European courts.

== Production and archival approach ==
The series notably integrates archival footage and contemporary interviews, blending over 500 archival fragments with new testimonies to create a seamless narrative. Its creative archival storytelling earned the "Excellence in Archive Production" Award of the International Federation of Television Archives in 2024.

== Broadcast and impact ==
The series aired on VRT Canvas in September 2023 and was made available on VRT MAX. Its societal impact was profound: it triggered a wave of public outrage, prompted a parliamentary debate (including the launch of an investigative commission), and resulted in over 1,700 more calls to the official victims' hotline, a massive media response, and coverage by political leaders.

Following the success and societal debate generated by Godvergeten, VTM commissioned the related four-part series De Nonnen (The Nuns) in 2025, which focused on abuse and misconduct committed by Catholic nuns in Flanders.

== Awards ==
- Winner of the FIAT/IFTA Archive Award for "Excellence in Archive Production" (2024).

== See also ==
- De nonnen – 2025 follow-up documentary about abuse by Catholic nuns in Flanders
- Kinderen van de kerk – a podcast dealing with forced adoption by religious institutions in Flanders, featuring similar themes of institutional abuse and survivor advocacy
