= Michael A. Hess =

American lawyer

Michael Anthony Hess
- official portrait, 1988
- Born: Anthony Lee; July 5, 1952; Roscrea, County Tipperary, Ireland
- Died: August 15, 1995 (aged 43); Washington, D.C., U.S.
- Resting place: Sean Ross Abbey; Roscrea, County Tipperary, Ireland
- Political party: Republican

Michael Anthony Hess (born Anthony Lee; July 5, 1952 – August 15, 1995) was an Irish-born American lawyer, deputy chief legal counsel and later chief legal counsel to the Republican National Committee (RNC) in the late 1980s and early 1990s.

He was born Anthony Lee to Philomena Lee in Ireland, and spent his first years of life in a convent before being adopted by Marge and Doc Hess of St. Louis, Missouri, US. The issues surrounding his adoption are controversial, as part of a program of forced adoptions practised by some Catholic religious orders in Ireland at the time, and the story of that early part of his life was later told in British journalist Martin Sixsmith's book The Lost Child of Philomena Lee and in the film Philomena.

== Personal life ==
Hess's birth mother Philomena Lee became pregnant at age 18 at a local carnival by a man named John who worked for the post office. She was disowned by her father and sent to Sean Ross Abbey, a mother and baby home for unwed mothers, which was operated by the Sisters of the Sacred Hearts of Jesus and Mary in Roscrea, County Tipperary, Ireland.

After she gave birth to Hess, she was able to be with her child until she was 22 and he was three while living in the abbey. As was common practice in Ireland at the time, the nuns sold him to the American couple, Ardo Michael "Doc" Hess and Marjorie "Marge" Lane. Lee did not know where her son was sent by the nuns after she left the Abbey after being pressured into signing the adoption papers.

Hess grew up in the American Midwest and was raised in a Catholic family. He graduated from the University of Notre Dame in 1974 and earned a J.D. degree at George Washington University.

Hess made three visits to Ireland to try to find his mother but was unsuccessful in persuading the nuns to divulge any information. He requested that his ashes be buried at Roscrea in the hope that his mother would be able to find his grave, which she eventually did. Hess never learned who his mother was.

He died from complications of AIDS, although this was not mentioned at the memorial service held for him. Hess' partner for the last 15 years of his life was Steve Dahllof. Dahllof credited the book The Lost Child of Philomena Lee with "about a three out of 10, in terms of accuracy", while the movie Philomena, "in accuracy of spirit, is 10 out of 10."

== Career ==
Hess became deputy chief legal counsel to the Republican National Committee, eventually rising to chief legal counsel. He was an important figure in the redistricting battles of the late 1980s and early 1990s, and was admired for his integrity and pursuit of justice on the critical issue of gerrymandering.

== Controversy ==
The programme of forced adoptions by some ecclesiastical authorities in Ireland and elsewhere during the 1950s has raised considerable debate, and the Michael Hess case has further highlighted this. Much of the paperwork relating to this programme was later destroyed and access to adoption archives has been cut off.

== Film ==
A film portraying Hess' adoption and his mother's later search for him was released in 2013. Philomena, directed by Stephen Frears and based on the book The Lost Child of Philomena Lee, starred Judi Dench as his mother, Sean Mahon as Hess, and Steve Coogan as Martin Sixsmith, the journalist who helped Philomena Lee identify her son.

== See also ==
- Loras Thomas Lane
