= Yngvild Ingels =

Belgian politician (born 1979)

Member of the Chamber of Representatives
- Incumbent
- Assumed office 26 May 2019

Personal details
- Born: Yngvild Ingels; 1 January 1979 (age 46); Dunkirk, France
- Political party: New Flemish Alliance

Yngvild Ingels (born 1 January 1979) is a Belgian politician and a member of the New Flemish Alliance.

Ingels studied sociology at Ghent University and worked for the Red Cross after graduating. She was elected to the Belgian Chamber of Representatives in 2019 where she serves on the Home Affairs, Security, Migration and Administrative Affairs Committees.

In December 2023, Ingels gave an emotional speech in the Belgian Federal Parliament in response to the podcast Kinderen van de kerk (Children of the Church), which investigates forced adoptions in Catholic institutions. Drawing from her own experience as an adoptee, she spoke publicly about her ongoing search for her biological parents.
