= RC Murphy's Lommel =

Belgian rugby union club, based in Lommel

Rugby Club Murphy's Lommel
- Founded: 2006; 20 years ago
- Location: Lommel, Belgium
- Coach: Eamon McLaughlin
Team kit

RC Murphy's Lommel is a Belgian rugby union club in Lommel. The club is so called after its original sponsor, the Murphy's Law pub.

== History ==
The club was founded in 2006.
