= De Nonnen =

- Genre: Documentary
- Created by: Borgerhoff & Lamberigts
- Country of origin: Belgium
- Original language: Dutch
- No. of episodes: 4

Original release
- Network: VTM
- Release: August 21, 2025

De Nonnen (Dutch for The Nuns) is a Belgian four-part documentary series about abuse and misconduct committed by Catholic nuns in Flanders. The series was produced by Borgerhoff & Lamberigts for VTM and premiered on Proximus Pickx+ on 21 August 2025, followed by terrestrial broadcast on VTM in autumn 2025.

== Overview ==
The series focuses on physical and sexual violence, forced separation of mothers and children, and abuse within orphanages, maternity homes, convents and schools run by religious sisters. Fourteen survivors share their testimonies, many for the first time.

== Episodes ==
1. Physical violence
2. Sexual violence
3. Forced separation and adoption
4. Testimonies of former nuns

== Locations and historical context ==
The first episode examines abuses in the orphanage Sint-Vincentius in Zelem, Limburg, including sexual, physical and psychological violence, disappearances and unregistered burials. A former staff member admitted to burying children in the local cemetery.

Another episode focuses on the maternity home Tamar in Lommel, run by the Sisters of Kindsheid Jesu, where unmarried mothers allegedly faced forced adoptions and sterilizations. The podcast Kinderen van de kerk has also investigated similar practices, describing how mothers were separated from their children under Church pressure and sometimes for financial gain.

== Context and analysis ==
Experts featured in the series include professor Ines Keygnaert, a specialist on sexual violence, and priest Rik Devillé, founder of Mensenrechten in de Kerk.

== Broadcast ==
De Nonnen premiered on Proximus Pickx+ on 21 August 2025 and was later broadcast weekly on VTM.

== Reception ==
- Sister Mieke Kerckhof, chair of the Unie van Vlaamse Religieuzen, expressed shock and "vicarious shame". She regretted that religious orders were not allowed to speak directly in the series, but only via short written statements at the end of each episode.
- Following revelations about Zelem, the public prosecutor in Limburg opened an official investigation.
- Survivor groups linked to Tamar also called for investigations, stating: "There is no excuse for further delay."
- Critics described the series as emotionally powerful yet less sharp than its predecessor Godvergeten.

== See also ==
- Godvergeten, a 2023 documentary on abuse by male clergy
- Kinderen van de kerk, a 2023 podcast on forced adoptions in Flanders
- Zusters zonder liefde, a 2024 book by journalist Jan Stevens about abuse by Catholic nuns in Flanders
