= Ruth Barnett =

Abortion provider in Oregon, USA

Ruth Barnett was an abortion provider operating in Portland, Oregon from 1918 to 1968.

She was born in Hood River, Oregon in 1895. In 1910, she moved with her family to Portland, Oregon, where she became pregnant at the age of sixteen. She sought an abortion from Dr. George Watts, which convinced her that all women should have the opportunity to receive an abortion if they wanted one. When she was 23, Barnett decided to become an abortion provider, turning to Dr. Alys Bixby Griff for training. Eventually she partnered with Dr. Watts, who taught her how to perform complex procedures and helped her get a medical license as a chiropractor.

She was first arrested in 1940 after a complication arose with a client at a clinic in Reno, Nevada. After this incident, Barnett was in prison intermittently, continuing to perform abortions. She performed an estimated 40,000 abortions and claimed no maternal deaths. In 1966, a Portland jury found her guilty of an unrelated manslaughter, while an Oregon City jury found her guilty of abortion in 1967. Her appeal of both verdicts was rejected by the Supreme Court in 1967, and she went to prison in February 1968. After this conviction she decided to retire.

Barnett co-authored an autobiography, They Weep on My Doorstep.

== Early life ==
Ruth Hanna was born in 1895 in Hood River, Oregon. She was the youngest of three children born to Margaret Belle Hanna and James Ellsworth Hanna. In 1910, Barnett moved with her family to Portland, Oregon. There her father became the first grocer in the village, and Barnett got a job as a dental assistant. In 1911, at the age of 16, Barnett became pregnant. Unsure what to do, she was referred to Dr. George Watts by a patient in her dental clinic. Dr. Watts, a respected physician in the area, performed an abortion on Barnett, and the experience profoundly changed her life. Saved from the shame of bearing an illegitimate child, she came out of the procedure with a conviction that anyone who wanted an abortion ought to be able to receive one.

Two years later, when she was eighteen, Ruth Barnett married Henry Cohen. Their marriage was largely unhappy and lasted only five years, but resulted in the birth of Barnett's daughter, Maggie. Through this marriage, Barnett met and befriended Dr. Alys Bixby Griff. Griff was one of the first female physicians in the Pacific Northwest, and she was beginning to specialize in abortions when she met Barnett. Throughout the course of their friendship, Barnett would visit Griff, listening attentively to the stories she told about her practice. Following Barnett's divorce from Cohen, she decided to pursue a career as an abortion provider with the help of Dr. Griff.

== Early career ==
At the age of 23, Ruth Barnett began working for Dr. Griff as an assistant. They worked closely for eleven years, with Griff allowing Barnett to stand in during operations to learn abortion techniques. Eventually Barnett was able to perform the operations herself, concluding that this was her life's work. Barnett parted uneasily with Griff eleven years later, partly due to growing disagreements about Barnett's role in the practice. Hoping to strike out on her own, she opened a small business that ultimately failed. That same year, she began to collaborate with Dr. George Watts, the same physician who gave her an abortion in 1911. Not only did Watts expand her knowledge of abortion techniques, he also helped her get a license to practice medicine. Barnett enrolled in a two-year chiropractor program, which placed an emphasis on naturopathy. After receiving her certification and apprenticing under Dr. Watts for another five years, Barnett began her independent career by buying the practices of several retiring physicians. Her practice operated on a sliding scale; wealthy women and girls paid the most for abortions, while poor women and girls paid little or nothing.

Despite the fact that abortions had been illegal in Oregon since 1854, Ruth Barnett was able to begin her long career as an abortion provider. She opened the Stewart Clinic in Portland, Oregon during the 1930s. It remained open for 30 years. The police paid little to no attention to her practice, as anti-abortion laws were rarely enforced at that time unless maternal death occurred. When she opened her practice, America was starting to feel the effects of the Great Depression. Because very few people could afford to have more children to feed, Barnett's practice was incredibly sought after. Many of her clients were wealthy women. Barnett made about $182,000 per year at this practice, which is the modern equivalent of about $3,250,000 per year. Despite her lack of legal certification, she maintained the highest safety record of practicing abortion providers in the area, including licensed practitioners. In fact, the majority of her patients were referred to her by properly licensed practitioners.

== Later career and trouble with the law ==
Though her clinic remained open, in 1940 Barnett was recruited to help operate a sect of abortion clinics in Reno, Nevada. She was recruited by Reg Rankin, who was trying to legitimize his abortion syndicate after a recent patient almost died of an infection. In later years, Barnett would deeply regret the decision to help run the clinic in Reno as one of the worst decisions of her career. Upon arriving, she found that the clinic was not properly set up or supplied, and after performing her first procedure there her patient developed an infection. This led to her first arrest, which was a huge embarrassment for a woman who prided herself on her safety record and skills as a practitioner. She was eventually released from custody after providing information about the abortion syndicate she was working for, then she fled back to Portland.

After the Reno incident, Barnett continued to work at the Stewart Clinic. During World War II, she may have seen up to 50 patients per day.

In the period following World War II, there was an increased crackdown on the enforcement of abortion laws. Additionally, the new mayor of Portland, Dorothy McCullough Lee, had promised to crack down on crime within the city. Barnett's granddaughter, Nina Glover, argues that Barnett's new trouble with the police was politically motivated. A police detected extorted 10,000 USD from her in 1950. In 1951, she was arrested for the first time in Portland, Oregon. This began a long relationship with the police. Throughout the 1950s and 1960s, Barnett was periodically in jail. Despite her regular interactions with law enforcement, Barnett continued to run her clinic. In fact, Stewart Clinic remained open for 33 years. In 1968, when Barnett was 73, the stints in jail and health problems forced her into retirement.

== Personal life ==
Ruth Barnett was very wealthy. She was well-known in Portland's social scene and frequently entertained guests in her house. She was married three times and had one daughter, Margaret St. James. She died of cancer in 1969.

== Legacy ==
Rickie Solinger, an American author and historian, wrote The Abortionist: A Woman Against the Law about Barnett.
