= Sean Ross Abbey =

Convent in Tipperary, Ireland

- Location in Ireland
- Coordinates: 52.9477°N 7.775°W
- Country: Ireland
- Province: Munster
- County: County Tipperary

Sean Ross Abbey south of Roscrea in County Tipperary, Ireland, is a convent and the location of St Anne's Special School run by the Sisters of the Sacred Hearts of Jesus and Mary. St Crónán is believed to have founded a monastery at this location in the 6th century.

== History ==
Crónán of Roscrea settled at Sean Ross, which was a wooded morass far from the haunts of men; in fact, it was utterly wild, so much so, that pilgrims would get lost, so Crónán abandoned it and moved to the more accessible wood of Cré, that is Roscrea, County Tipperary. In the 7th century, Culdees established a presence on Monahincha, but later gave way to Augustinian canons. The Augustinians relocated to Sean Ross in 1485.

== Buildings ==
The main building was built about 1750 as Corville House, a Georgian country house with two storeys over a basement. Although much extended and fitted with UPVC windows, the house is listed as being of special architectural and artistic interest. The gardener's house and walled garden are also mentioned in the National Inventory of Architectural Heritage. Within the grounds are the ruined Corville Abbey with its associated small graveyard, an ice house and a lime kiln. There are also several functional modern buildings associated with the school.

Corville House was the home of the Anglo-Irish Prittie family (the Barons Dunalley) during the 18th and 19th centuries. Count John O'Byrne purchased the estate in the 19th century and lived there until 1930. The Sisters of the Sacred Hearts of Jesus and Mary came to Sean Ross Abbey in 1932.

== St Anne’s Special School ==
St. Anne's School opened in February 1971. It provides specialist services students four to eighteen years of age who may present with either a severe/profound general learning disability, or with autism.

== Mother and baby home ==
A mother and baby home operated at Sean Ross from about 1932 to 1970. Babies born to unmarried girls in the home were put up for adoption, 487 of them in the United States, though the most common exit pathway for a child was to return to their mother or family (44%). Although the number of babies born at Sean Ross declined rapidly in the 1950s, adoptions greatly increased due to the introduction of a legal process of adoption in 1953. What records are available for Sean Ross adoptions are held by Child and Family Agency (TUSLA). Martin Sixsmith's book, The Lost Child of Philomena Lee and the film Philomena, based on it, concern the controversial adoption of Michael A. Hess, born Anthony Lee to Philomena Lee at Sean Ross Abbey in 1952. The graves of an unknown number of mothers and babies are located in the unmarked area known as the Angels Plot.

In February 2018, the sisters put up for sale a large part of the campus, exclusive of St. Anne's school and the cemeteries, which was to continue to be maintained by the congregation, and remain accessible. On 27 July 2020, journalist Alison O'Reilly, who broke the story of the Tuam Babies burial scandal in 2014, uncovered the names of the 1,024 children who died in Sean Ross Abbey. The story was printed in the Irish Daily Star after the details were secured under the Freedom of Information Act. A total of 1,090 "illegitimate children" died in Sean Ross Abbey mother and baby home over a thirty-seven-year period. The official death list, also revealed how 128 children died from "Marasmus" - meaning severe malnutrition. Other causes of deaths include convulsions and exhaustion, while two babies died from sun and heat stroke. One death certificate shows a child died from acute heart failure as a result of choking on porridge. The number of children's deaths in Sean Ross Abbey, is higher than the registered deaths in the Tuam mother and baby home where 796 children died, as well as the 817 in Bessborough in Cork.

Historian Catherine Corless, who uncovered the names of the children who died in the Tuam home between 1925 and 1961, said: "This is horrifying. Those poor children, you wonder were they just putting down anything for causes of deaths, or did the children actually die this way? It seems that when a large group of children died, they said 'we'll put down cardiac arrest for those 15. It's appalling". The names of the children were displayed in the "Stay With Me" art show, which is a group exhibition of an artist's response to the Tuam Babies story.

== See also ==
- Mother and Baby Homes Commission of Investigation
