= A Girl Like Her (2012 film) =

- Directed by: Ann Fessler
- Produced by: Ann Fessler
- Edited by: Ann Fessler
- Music by: Mike Reid and Jacqueline Schwab
- Distributed by: Women Make Movies
- Release date: April 13, 2012 (Full Frame Documentary Film Festival)
- Running time: 48 minutes
- Country: United States
- Language: English

A Girl Like Her is a 2012 American documentary film by Ann Fessler about women who lost children to adoption in the United States between the end of World War II and the early 1970s due to the social pressures of the time, in a period now known as the Baby Scoop Era. Fessler combines the voices of the women with footage from educational films and newsreels about dating, sex, “illegitimate” pregnancy and adoption. The women's stories unfold over footage of life in post-World War II America. Educational films offer guidance about dating and sex, and scripted newsreels shed light on adoption in an era when secrecy prevailed and adoptable babies were thought to be “unwanted” by their mothers. As the footage illuminates the past, the women's stories form a collective narrative as they recount their experiences of dating, pregnancy, family reaction, banishment, and the long-term impact of surrender and silence on their lives.

== Production ==
Fessler, a documentary filmmaker, installation artist, and author, began working with the subject of adoption in 1989 after being approached by a woman who thought Ann was the daughter she had relinquished 40 years earlier. Though the woman was not her mother, Fessler, an adoptee, was deeply moved by the woman's story.

She subsequently produced several autobiographical installations on adoption; two featured her previous short films Cliff & Hazel about her adoptive family, and Along the Pale Blue River (2001/2013) about her search for a yearbook picture of her mother. At each installation site, Fessler invited audience members to write and post their own adoption stories, and based on the anonymous stories left behind by first-time mothers, she initiated an oral history project to collect the women's stories.

In 2002, Fessler began interviewing women who lost children to adoption between 1945-1973, when an unprecedented 1.5 million babies were surrendered under tremendous social pressure. In 2003 she was awarded a Radcliffe Fellowship at the Radcliffe Institute for Advanced Study to continue her academic research, interviews, and archival footage research. A Girl Like Her ultimately took 10 years to complete.

While at the Radcliffe Institute at Harvard, Fessler also began writing a non-fiction book based on her research and the oral histories she was collecting. By 2005 she had collected 100 stories from women living in every region of the United States. The Girls Who Went Away: the Hidden History of Women Who Surrendered Children for Adoption in the Decades Before Roe v. Wade, places the women's stories within the social history of the time period and Fessler's story as an adoptee. It was a nonfiction finalist for the National Book Critics Circle Award in 2006 and received the Women's Way Ballard Book Prize in 2008, a prize given annually to a female author who makes a significant contribution to the dialogue about women's rights.

== Film Festivals & Awards ==
A Girl Like Her premiered at the Full Frame Documentary Film Festival in April 2012 and went on to screen at the Minneapolis-St. Paul International Film Festival, Minnesota, 2012; AFI-Discovery Channel SILVERDOCS Documentary Festival, Washington, DC, 2012; Rhode Island International Film Festival, Providence, RI (2012 Grand Prize, Providence Film Festival Award); Montreal World Film Festival, Canada, 2012 (Canadian Premiere); Milwaukee Film Festival, Wisconsin, 2012; Mill Valley Film Festival, California; New Orleans Film Festival, Louisiana, 2012; Hot Springs Documentary Film Festival, Arkansas, 2012; Rocky Mountain Women's Film Festival, Colorado Springs, Colorado, 2012; San Francisco Documentary Film Festival, California, 2012; International Documentary Festival, Amsterdam, 2012 (European Premiere); WATCH DOCS, Human Rights Film Festival, Warsaw, Poland, December 2012; WATCH DOCS International Traveling Human Rights Festival, Poland, 2013 (traveling to: Tarnowskie Góry, Żywiec, Toruń, Oświęcim, Cieszyn, Jawor, Olsztyn, Słupsk, Bielsko-Biała, Kielce, Zielona Góra, Suwałki, Mrągowo, Sanok, Kraków, Gorzów, Wielkopolski, Katowice, Szczecin, Rzeszów, Siedlce, and Gdańsk); DocAviv International Documentary Film Festival, Tel Aviv, Israel, 2013; Utopia Film Festival, Maryland, 2013; DMZ International Documentary Film Festival, South Korea, 2013; Women Take the Reel Film Festival, Boston 2014; Northern Ireland Human Rights Festival, Belfast, Northern Ireland, 2014.

A Girl Like Her has also been screened widely at colleges, museums, and conferences.

A Girl Like Her is distributed in North America by Women Make Movies, and in Europe by Journeyman Pictures.

A Girl Like Her was broadcast by the UR-Swedish Educational Broadcasting Company, in 2013.

== Additional reviews and articles ==
- Bekiempis, Victoria. Bitch Magazine: Feminist Response to Pop Culture. Review of A Girl Like Her, Fall 2013. Print.
- British Journal of Photography. "The Mother." British Journal of Photography, 01 Oct. 2013. Web. 16 June 2015.
- Davies, Lucy. "A Conversation With Ann Fessler" Fotoblog. Hatje Cantz, 29 Oct. 2013. Web. 16 June 2015.
- EngagedScholarship@CSU. "Adoption's Hidden History: Featuring the Cleveland Debut of the Documentary Film by Ann Fessler A Girl Like Her." Cleveland State University, Nov. 2012. Web. 16 June 2015.
- The Foundling Museum. "Home Truths: Photography, Motherhood and Loss. Interview with Director Ann Fessler." YouTube. The Foundling Museum, 7 Nov. 2013. Web. 16 June 2015.
- Pelton-Cooper, Mary. "A Girl Like Her : An Effective Film for Teaching Reproductive Health Issues to Undergraduates." Women's Reproductive Health 1.1 (2014): 71-72. Print.
- Puffer-Rothenberg, M. Video Librarian. Review of A Girl Like Her, Sept/Oct 2013. Print.
- Riben, Mirah. "The Trauma of Mothers Who Have Lost Children to Adoption." The Huffington Post. 24 Mar. 2015. Web. 16 June 2015.
- Schindel, Dan. "The Doc Option: Before "Philomena" Watch "A Girl Like Her"" Nonfics: Real Stories, Real Insight. 27 Nov. 2013. Web. 16 June 2015.
