= Kinderen van de kerk =

- Language: Dutch

Cast and voices
- Hosted by: Achille Van Ingelgem, Feline Franceus

Publication
- Original release: 13 December 2023 – 3 January 2024
- Provider: Het Laatste Nieuws
- Updates: Weekly (limited series)

Kinderen van de kerk (Children of the Church) is a four-part Belgian podcast series released between December 2023 and January 2024. It was created by podcast makers Achille Van Ingelgem and Feline Franceus, in collaboration with the newspaper Het Laatste Nieuws. The series explores the history of forced adoptions by Roman Catholic institutions in Belgium.

The podcast presents testimonies from mothers and adopted children, often speaking publicly for the first time. It critically examines the role of Catholic religious orders, particularly nuns, in separating children from their mothers, sometimes without informed consent. Allegations are made that these institutions were financially compensated, raising concerns about child laundering and human trafficking..

A central focus is the maternity home Tamar in Lommel, operated by the nuns of the Congregation of Kindsheid Jesu. Survivors allege that children were taken from their mothers at Tamar under coercive circumstances. A dedicated survivor group maintains a website to share testimonies and pursue justice.. The third episode of the Belgian VTM documentary series De Nonnen also covered the abuses at the maternity home Tamar, which are central to this podcast. In the documentary, witness Peter stated that he had filed a formal complaint concerning his own alleged abduction.

Among the experts featured in the podcast is Flemish priest, writer, and activist Rik Devillé. Known for his work supporting victims of abuse in the Church, Devillé also appeared in the 2023 VRT CANVAS documentary series Godvergeten. He is the co-founder of Mensenrechten in de Kerk (1992), an organization defending human rights within the Church.

The podcast also drew political attention when Yngvild Ingels, a member of the Belgian Federal Parliament for the N-VA, gave an emotional speech regarding her own background as an adoptee..

== Episodes ==
Episode	Air date	Title (Dutch)
1	13 December 2023	De Moeders (The Mothers)
2	20 December 2023	De Kinderen (The Children)
3	27 December 2023	De Verantwoordelijken (The Responsible)
4	3 January 2024	Het Geld (The Money)

== See also ==
- De nonnen
