= Philomena (film) =

2013 drama film

- Theatrical release poster
- Directed by: Stephen Frears
- Screenplay by: Steve Coogan; Jeff Pope
- Based on: The Lost Child of Philomena Lee by Martin Sixsmith
- Produced by: Gabrielle Tana; Steve Coogan; Tracey Seaward
- Starring: Judi Dench; Steve Coogan
- Cinematography: Robbie Ryan
- Edited by: Valerio Bonelli
- Music by: Alexandre Desplat
- Production companies: Pathé; BBC Films; BFI; Yucaipa Films; Canal+; Ciné+; Baby Cow Productions; Magnolia Mae Films
- Distributed by: Pathé Distribution (France and Switzerland); 20th Century Fox (United Kingdom and Ireland); The Weinstein Company (United States, Canada and Spain)
- Release dates: 31 August 2013 (Venice); 1 November 2013 (United Kingdom); 22 November 2013 (United States); 8 January 2014 (France)
- Running time: 98 minutes
- Countries: France; United Kingdom; United States
- Language: English
- Budget: $12 million
- Box office: $100.1 million

Philomena is a 2013 drama film directed by Stephen Frears, based on the 2009 book The Lost Child of Philomena Lee by journalist Martin Sixsmith. The film stars Judi Dench as Philomena Lee, an elderly woman who has been searching for her son for 50 years, and Steve Coogan as Sixsmith, who tries to help her find him.

The film gained critical praise and received several international film awards. Coogan and Jeff Pope won Best Screenplay at the 70th Venice International Film Festival, while the film was also awarded the People's Choice Award Runner-Up prize at the 2013 Toronto International Film Festival. The film was nominated for four Oscars at the 86th Academy Awards: Best Picture, Best Adapted Screenplay, Best Actress (for Dench), and Best Original Score. It was also nominated for four BAFTA Awards and three Golden Globe Awards.

== Plot ==
London-based journalist Martin Sixsmith has lost his job as a government adviser. He is approached at a party by the daughter of Philomena Lee. She suggests that he write a story about her mother, who was forced to give up her toddler son Anthony nearly fifty years ago. Though Sixsmith is initially reluctant to write a human interest story, he meets Philomena and decides to investigate her case.

In 1951, Philomena became pregnant after having sex with a man she did not know at a county fair, so was sent by her father to Sean Ross Abbey in Roscrea in Ireland. After giving birth, she was forced to work in the convent laundry for four years, with little contact with her son. The nuns gave her son up for adoption without giving Philomena a chance to say goodbye. She kept her lost son a secret from her family for nearly fifty years.

Martin and Philomena begin their search at the convent. The nuns claim that the adoption records were destroyed in a fire years earlier; they did not, however, lose the contract she was forced to sign decades ago forbidding her from contacting her son, which Martin considers suspicious. At a pub, the locals tell Martin that the convent burnt the records deliberately, and that most of the children were sold for £1,000 each to wealthy Americans.

Martin's investigation reaches a dead end in Ireland, but he receives a promising lead from the United States so invites Philomena to accompany him there. His contacts help him discover that Anthony was renamed Michael A. Hess, who became a lawyer and senior official in the Reagan and George H. W. Bush administrations. When Philomena notices Martin in the background of a photo of Michael, he remembers that he met him years earlier while working in the US. They also learn that he has been dead for eight years.

Philomena decides she wants to meet people who knew Michael to learn more about him from them. Visiting a former colleague of Michael's they discover that Michael was gay and died of AIDS. They also visit his 'sister' Mary, who was adopted at the same time from the convent, and learn that they were both emotionally and physically abused by their adoptive parents, and hear about Michael’s partner, Pete Olsson.

After avoiding Martin's attempts to contact him, Pete agrees to talk to Philomena. He shows her some videos of his life with Michael. To Martin and Philomena's surprise, they see footage of Michael, dated shortly before he died, at the Abbey where he was adopted, and Pete explains that, although he never told his family, Michael had privately wondered about his birth mother all his life, so had returned to Ireland in his final months to try to find her. Pete informs them that the nuns had told Michael that his mother had abandoned him and they had lost contact with her. He also reveals that, against his parents' wishes, he had Michael buried in the convent's cemetery.

Philomena and Martin return to the convent to ask where Michael's grave is. Despite Philomena's pleas, Martin angrily forces his way into the private quarters and argues with an elderly nun, Sister Hildegarde McNulty, who worked at the convent when Anthony was forcibly adopted. He accuses her of lying to Anthony and denying him the chance to finally reunite with Philomena, purely out of self-righteousness. Hildegarde is unrepentant, saying that losing her son was Philomena's penance for having sex out of wedlock.

Martin demands an apology, telling her that what she did was un-Christian, but is speechless when Philomena instead chooses to forgive her of her own volition. She then asks to see her son's grave, where Martin tells her he has chosen not to publish the story. Philomena tells him to publish it anyway.

== Cast ==
- Judi Dench as Philomena Lee
- Steve Coogan as Martin Sixsmith
- Michelle Fairley as Sally Mitchell
- Barbara Jefford as Sister Hildegarde
- Anna Maxwell Martin as Jane
- Mare Winningham as Mary

In addition to the main cast, Sophie Kennedy Clark plays a young Philomena, Kate Fleetwood plays a young Sister Hildegarde, Simone Lahbib plays Kate Sixsmith, Cathy Belton plays Sister Claire, Charlie Murphy plays Kathleen, Amy McAllister plays Sister Anunciata, Sean Mahon plays Michael, Philomena's son, and Peter Hermann plays Pete Olsson.

== Soundtrack ==
The score of the film was composed by Alexandre Desplat, which was released on 25 October 2013 by Decca Records.

== Reception ==
=== Box office ===
Philomena grossed $37.7 million in the United States and Canada, and $62.4 million in other territories, for a worldwide total of $100.1 million, against a production budget of $12 million.

In the film's second weekend of release, it grossed $4.5 million from 835 cinemas, finishing ninth.

=== Critical response ===
On Rotten Tomatoes, the film holds an approval rating of 91% based on 199 reviews, with an average rating of 7.74/10. The website's critical consensus reads: "Based on a powerful true story and led by note-perfect performances from Judi Dench and Steve Coogan, Philomena offers a profoundly affecting drama for adult filmgoers of all ages." At Metacritic, the film received a weighted average score of 77 out of 100, based on 42 critics, indicating "generally favorable reviews". Audiences polled by CinemaScore gave the film an average grade of "A" on an A+ to F scale.

In The New York Times, Stephen Holden described the film as "so quietly moving that it feels lit from within." He wrote: "That [Dench] makes you believe her character has the capacity to forgive provides the movie with a solid moral center." He found the film's political viewpoint particularly sophisticated:

Philomena has many facets. It is a comedic road movie, a detective story, an infuriated anticlerical screed, and an inquiry into faith and the limitations of reason, all rolled together. Fairly sophisticated about spiritual matters, it takes pains to distinguish faith from institutionalized piety. It also has a surprising political subtext in its comparison of the church's oppression and punishment of unmarried sex ... with homophobia and the United States government's reluctance to deal with the AIDS crisis in the 1980s.

Kelly Torrance of The Washington Times found that the film "ultimately feels false", with the filmmakers succumbing to the temptation to focus on the "lessons" the story holds at the expense of the human story itself. Justin Chang, of Variety, called the film a "smug but effective middlebrow crowdpleaser." While noting Dench's "fine, dignified performance", he observed that much of the humor here comes at the expense of Dench's character. "[I]t's hard not to wonder if the writers are simply scoring points off [Philomena]."

Rex Reed of The New York Observer gave the film a glowing review and named it the Best Film of 2013, saying: "It's profoundly moving and thoroughly mind provoking, but despite the poignant subject matter, I promise you will not leave Philomena depressed. I've seen it twice and felt exhilarated, informed, enriched, absorbed and optimistic both times. This is filmmaking at its most refined. I will probably forget most of what happened at the movies in 2013, but I will never forget Philomena."

=== Awards ===
The film and its cast and crew earned several award nominations, including four Academy Award nominations and four British Academy Film Award nominations. At the British Independent Film Awards, Dench and Coogan were nominated Best Actress and Best Actor, respectively. Along with her lifetime fifth Oscar nomination for Best Actress, Philomena saw Dench nominated Best Actress by the Broadcast Film Critics Association, London Film Critics' Circle, Satellite Awards and Screen Actors Guild Awards. Philomena garnered three nominations at the 71st Golden Globe Awards, and took home a win, at the 2014 David di Donatello Awards, securing the statuette for Best European Film.

== Historical authenticity ==
The film is based on the scandal of forced adoptions in Ireland. It employs artistic licence with the real-life events. The visual blog Information is Beautiful deduced that, while taking creative licence into account, the film was 70.9% accurate when compared to real-life events due to "the (understandable) dramatic insertion of journalist Martin Sixsmith into the main plot line and big liberties with what Philomena actually knew and didn't know about her lost son". Philomena did not accompany Sixsmith to Washington to find her son, and her son's partner was keen to meet her and flew to the UK where they met in Sixsmith's house.

The film's principal antagonist, Sister Hildegard McNulty, existed in real life but the movie took broad artistic liberty to portray her in a negative light. The final scene in which McNulty chastises Philomena for carnality from her wheelchair is fictional. McNulty died in 1995, nine years before Sixsmith began his investigation into the Abbey; the two never met in real life. Sister Julie Rose, the order's assistant congregational leader, said: "We do feel that the film, even though it is not a documentary, does not tell the whole truth and in many ways is very misleading." An archival 1986 RTÉ interview of Sr Hildegarde depicts a woman weeping over many of the mothers who were in her care.

In a 2009 article for The Guardian, Sixsmith says that in mid-twentieth-century Ireland, the Catholic church forced unwed mothers in their care to give up their children for adoption. Following pressure to do so, a Commission was formed by the Government of Ireland to investigate Mother and Baby Homes in 2015.

Sixsmith has said that Coogan's portrayal of him shared his "intolerance of injustice in all walks of life", and his admiration for a woman like Philomena who has the strength to rise above this. However, he is less angry than his on-screen version and is an agnostic rather than an atheist.

== See also ==
- Bon Secours Mother and Baby Home
