= Philomena Lee =

Irish woman described by Martin Sixsmith (born 1933)

- Born: 24 March 1933 (age 93); Newcastle West, County Limerick, Ireland
- Occupations: Nurse (retired), activist
- Known for: Subject of The Lost Child of Philomena Lee
- Spouses: John E. Libberton (m. 1959; div. 1983) Philip Gibson (m. 1984)
- Children: 3 (including Michael A. Hess)

Annie Philomena Lee (born 24 March 1933) is an Irish woman whose life was chronicled in the 2009 book The Lost Child of Philomena Lee by Martin Sixsmith. The book was made into a film titled Philomena (2013), which was nominated for four Academy Awards, including Best Actress, for Judi Dench's portrayal of Philomena, and Best Picture.

Lee is now an advocate and spokesperson for adoption rights. Lee has created The Philomena Project in order to raise awareness about adoption laws and find ways to improve them. In February 2014, she met Pope Francis to discuss adoption policies.

== Biography ==
Philomena Lee was born Annie Philomena Lee in County Limerick, Ireland in 1933. Her mother died of tuberculosis when Lee was six years-old. Her father, a butcher, sent Lee and her sisters, Kaye and Mary, to a convent school, but kept his sons at home. After Lee completed her formal education at the convent, she went to live with her maternal aunt, Kitty Madden.

When she was 18 years-old, Lee became pregnant by a man named John, who worked for the post office. She was sent to the Sean Ross Abbey in Roscrea, a place for unwed mothers. After giving birth to a son, Lee worked unpaid at the Abbey, where she was forced to stay until she was 22, at which time the Abbey placed her 3-year-old son to be adopted by a Catholic family in the United States.

This was done without Lee's consent, and against her expressed wishes. At that time in Ireland, such treatment of unwed mothers was commonplace. After forcing Lee to sign the adoption papers, the nuns who were involved refused to disclose any details regarding her son's fate, except that he was taken to the United States. After she left the Abbey, Lee moved to England and studied to become a nurse.

Married in 1959, Lee had two more children, Jane and Kevin, and worked as a nurse. She divorced her first husband and later remarried.

== Book ==
Around Christmas, in 2003, Lee revealed to her family that she had given birth to a son when she was 19, and she did not know his whereabouts. For decades, she had secretly been trying to find out what had happened to her son, without success. Her daughter, Jane, decided to approach journalist Martin Sixsmith at a New Year's Eve Party a few weeks later. Sixsmith and Philomena spent years researching, until they discovered her son had been adopted by an American couple, Doc and Marge Hess, who named the child Michael Hess. The Hess family also adopted a little girl named Mary from the Abbey; Mary and Michael grew up together as siblings. Sixsmith and Philomena eventually came to learn that Michael died of AIDS in 1995, and that for years he had tried, without success, to find his birth mother. Before his death he arranged to be buried at the Sean Ross Abbey, in the hope that his mother might someday find his grave, which she eventually did.

== Film ==
A script was developed by Jeff Pope and Steve Coogan based on Sixsmith's book. Stephen Frears directed with Judi Dench cast as Philomena. The film was distributed by The Weinstein Company in November 2013 and was nominated for four Academy Awards, including Best Picture, Best Actress, Best Adapted Screenplay, and Best Original Score.
