= Rickie Solinger =

American historian and curator

Rickie Solinger (born 1947) is an American independent historian, curator, and lecturer whose work focuses on reproductive politics, welfare politics, politics of incarceration, race and class, and motherhood. She is the author of Wake Up Little Susie: Single Pregnancy and Race before Roe v. Wade, The Abortionist: A Woman Against the Law, Beggars and Choosers: How the Politics of Choice Shapes Adoption, Abortion, and Welfare in the U.S., Pregnancy and Power: A Short History of Reproductive Politics in America, Reproductive Politics: What Everyone Needs to Know, and, with co-author Loretta Ross, "Reproductive Justice: An Introduction," as well as articles about reproductive politics and welfare politics. Solinger curates art exhibitions associated with the themes of her books; the shows travel to college and university galleries around the country aiming to interrupt the curriculum.

== Life and career ==
She earned her Ph.D. in History from The Graduate Center of the City University of New York.

She is a founding member of Women United for Justice, Community, and Family, a Boulder, Colorado-based cross-class coalition of women committed to welfare justice. She has served on the Boulder County Welfare Review Committee and frequently speaks and writes in the community and elsewhere on matters of poverty, welfare, and economic justice.

== Works ==
=== Books ===
Title	Year	Award
Wake Up Little Susie: Single Pregnancy and Race before Roe v. Wade	1992	Lerner-Scott Award
The Abortionist: A Woman Against the Law	1994	
Beggars and Choosers: How the Politics of Choice Shapes Adoption, Abortion, and Welfare in the U.S.	2001	
Pregnancy and Power: A Short History of Reproductive Politics in America	2005	
Reproductive Politics: What Everyone Needs to Know	2013	
Reproductive Justice: An Introduction (Co-author with Loretta Ross)	2017	

=== Scholarly articles ===
Title	Year
"The Girl Nobody Loved: Psychological Explanations for White Single Pregnancy in the Pre-Roe v. Wade Era, 1945-1965", Frontiers: A Journal of Women Studies	1990
"'Race and ‘Value’: Black and White Illegitimate Babies in the U. S., 1945-1965", Gender and History	1992
"'A Complete Disaster’: Abortion and the Politics of Hospital Abortion Boards, 1950-1970", Feminist Studies	1993
"Poor and Pregnant in the United States: 1950s, 1970s, 1990s", Social Justice	1994
“Dependency and Choice: The Two Faces of Eve”, Social Justice	1998
"Poisonous Choice", Bad Mothers	1998
"...But No Faith in the People.", Social Justice	2001
"The First Welfare Case: Money, Sex, Marriage, and White Supremacy in Selma, 1966, A Reproductive Justice Analysis", Journal of Women's History	2010
"Layering the Lenses: Toward Understanding Reproductive Politics in the United States", Journal of Women's History	2013

=== Editor ===
Title	Year
Abortion Wars: Fifty Years of Struggle, 1950-2000	2000
Welfare: A Documentary History Of U.S. Policy And Politics	2003
Telling Stories to Change the World: Global Voices on the Power of Narrative to Build Community and Make Social Justice Claims	2008
Interrupted Life: Experiences of Incarcerated Women in the United States	2010

=== Art installations ===
Solinger creates art exhibitions associated with the theme of her books and installs them at college and university galleries. She uses art together with her scholarship to enrich opportunities for public education and interrupt the curriculum. She has produced art installations working with sculptors, photographers, and other activists since 1992. Her exhibitions have traveled to over 140 college and university galleries since 1992.

- "Wake Up Little Susie: Pregnancy and Power before Roe v. Wade"
- "Beggars and Choosers: Motherhood is Not a Class Privilege in America" - This exhibition, associated with the theme of Beggars and Choosers, made a visual claim for the legitimacy of all mothers and the importance of defending reproductive rights. The mothers in the photographs rejected or ignored the coercive politics of motherhood. This exhibition clarified the full meaning of reproductive rights: the right to decide to curb one's fertility as well as the right to decide to become a mother. It opened at the Birmingham Civil Rights Institute in 2002 and traveled to campuses up until late 2008.
- "Interrupted Life: Incarcerated Mothers in the United States" - This exhibition focuses on raising public knowledge—and public outrage and activism—about the incarceration system in this country. It is a collection of paintings, photographs, and installation pieces. It opened at the California Institution for Women in 2006 (the first time an outside art exhibition opened in a prison).
- "Reimagining the Distaff Toolkit" This exhibition features approximately thirty-five pieces of art. Each work of art features a tool that was important for women's domestic labor from the 18th century through World War II. The artists have placed objects such as a dressmaker’s figure, pots, pans, baskets, rolling pins, darning eggs and rug-beaters at the center of their works. According to Solinger, “Many of these old tools facilitated… repetitive labor and evoke the various cultural histories of women’s unpaid, often diminished and disrespected status within the household and society. But in the 21st century, at a moment when ‘old tools’ have become aestheticized and expensive, we can look again and see their costly beauty."

== Awards ==
In 1992 she won the first Lerner-Scott Award given by the Organization of American Historians for Wake Up Little Susie and in 2000 she received the Catherine Prelinger Award.
