= The Girls Who Went Away =

2006 book by Ann Fessler

- Author: Ann Fessler
- Language: English
- Genre: Non-fiction
- Publisher: Penguin Press
- Publication date: May 4, 2006
- Publication place: United States
- ISBN: 9781594200946

The Girls Who Went Away: The Hidden History of Women Who Surrendered Children for Adoption in the Decades Before Roe v. Wade is a 2006 book by Ann Fessler which describes and recounts the experiences of women in the United States who relinquished babies for adoption between 1950 and the Roe v. Wade decision in 1973.

== About ==
Fessler conceived of the book through her own experience looking for her biological mother. As a documentary filmmaker, installation artist, and author, Fessler first produced several autobiographical installations on adoption; two featured her previous short films Cliff & Hazel about her adoptive family, and Along the Pale Blue River (2001/2013) about her search for a yearbook picture of her mother. At each installation site, Fessler invited audience members to write and post their own adoption stories and based on the anonymous stories left behind by first mothers, she initiated an oral history project to collect the women's stories.

In 2002, Fessler began interviewing women who lost children to adoption between 1945 and 1973, when an unprecedented 1.5 million babies were surrendered under tremendous social pressure. She collected over 100 oral histories of women who had relinquished their children and the shame and guilt they felt which had effectively silenced them. The book uses these oral histories to analyze the social contexts of adoption, including the pressures placed on the birth mother by family, adoption agencies, and society at large to give up the child for adoption, and the long-term psychological consequences for this event on her in the "baby scoop era."

Oral stories in the book were highly critical of homes for unwed mothers, particularly the Florence Crittenton Homes, and their coercive practices and the requirement of the women in it to give up their children for adoption. Social workers in the homes classified the primarily white unwed mothers as neurotic or morally bankrupt and subjected them to extreme secrecy and psychological intimidation. However, unwed African-American women were expected to keep their children due to the stereotypes of the time that deemed black women were sexually promiscuous.

In 2006, the book was a finalist for the National Book Critics Circle Award and received the Women's Way Ballard Book Prize in 2008, a prize given annually to a female author who makes a significant contribution to the dialogue about women's rights.

== Editions ==
- Hardcover, Penguin Press, 2006. ISBN 1-59420-094-7
- Paperback, Penguin Press, 2007. ISBN 0-14-303897-4
