= Martin Sixsmith =

British author and presenter

- Born: 24 September 1954 (age 71); Warrington, England
- Education: The Manchester Grammar School
- Alma mater: Oxford University
- Occupation: Writer

Martin Sixsmith (born 24 September 1954) is a British author and radio/television presenter, primarily working for the BBC. He has also worked as an adviser to the Labour government and to the BBC television comedy series The Thick of It. Sixsmith's book about Philomena Lee, The Lost Child of Philomena Lee, was the basis for the 2013 film Philomena, in which Sixsmith is played by Steve Coogan.

== Education ==
Sixsmith was born in Warrington. He was educated at the Manchester Grammar School, then studied Russian at New College, Oxford, Harvard, the Sorbonne University in Paris, and in Saint Petersburg – then called Leningrad – in Russia. He was a Slavics instructor at Harvard, and wrote his postgraduate thesis about Russian poetry. Between 2002 and 2007 he studied Psychology and Applied Psychology as a mature student at Birkbeck College, University of London, and at London Metropolitan University.

== Career and writings ==
Sixsmith joined the BBC in 1980 as a foreign correspondent, reporting from Moscow during the presidencies of Mikhail Gorbachev and Boris Yeltsin and the collapse of the Soviet Union. He also reported from Poland during the Solidarity uprising and was the BBC's Washington correspondent during the election and first presidential term of Bill Clinton. He was based in Russia for five years, the US for four, Brussels for four and Poland for three.

Sixsmith left the BBC in 1997 to work for the newly elected government of Tony Blair. He became Director of Communications (a civil service post), working first with Harriet Harman and Frank Field, then with Alistair Darling. His next position was as a Director of GEC plc, where he oversaw the rebranding of the company as Marconi Communications.

In December 2001, he returned to the Civil Service as Director of Communications for the Department for Transport, Local Government and the Regions, where he became embroiled in a scandal over the actions of Jo Moore. Moore was a special adviser to the transport secretary Stephen Byers who had been the subject of much public condemnation for suggesting that a controversial announcement could be "buried" by being made in the wake of the September 11, 2001 attacks. Sixsmith incurred the displeasure of Tony Blair when his email advising Byers and Moore not to bury more bad news was leaked to the press. The government tried to force him to resign, but had later to issue an apology and pay him compensation.

Sixsmith was widely expected to write a memoir or autobiography in the wake of his civil service departure. Instead, he produced a novel about near-future politics called Spin which was published in 2004, and indirectly led to his employment as an adviser on The Thick of It. His second novel, I Heard Lenin Laugh, was published in 2005.

In 2006, he was commissioned by BBC Radio 4 to present a series of programmes on Russian poetry, literature and art, Challenging the Silence.

In 2007, Sixsmith wrote The Litvinenko File, an examination of the feud between the Kremlin and Russia's émigré oligarchs.

In 2008 he worked on two BBC documentaries exploring the legacy of the KGB in Russia and also presented a BBC documentary, The Snowy Streets of St Petersburg, about artists and writers who fled the former Eastern bloc.

In 2009, The Lost Child of Philomena Lee was published, about the forcible separation of Philomena Lee and her son, Michael A. Hess, by the nuns of Sean Ross Abbey, an Irish convent, during the 1950s, and the subsequent attempts of Lee and Hess to contact one another.

In 2010, he wrote Putin's Oil, about Russia's energy wars and their consequences for Moscow and the world.

In 2011, Sixsmith presented Russia: The Wild East, a 50-part history of Russia for BBC Radio 4. His book Russia, a 1,000-Year Chronicle of the Wild East was published by Random House.

He continued to work as an adviser to the BBC political sitcom, The Thick of It, and the Oscar-nominated film, In the Loop.

In 2013, The Lost Child of Philomena Lee was adapted into the film Philomena, directed by Stephen Frears, starring Judi Dench and Steve Coogan (as Sixsmith), and written by Coogan and Jeff Pope. It was nominated for four Oscars.

In 2014, Sixsmith presented a 25-part BBC Radio 4 series about the history of psychology and psychiatry, In Search of Ourselves.

In 2015, he made a BBC television documentary, Ireland's Lost Babies, in which he revisited Philomena's story by travelling to the United States to investigate the Irish Catholic Church's role in an adoption trade which saw thousands of children taken from their mothers and sent abroad.

His 2017 book, Ayesha's Gift, is the story of a young woman's search to discover the truth about her father, who had been murdered in Pakistan.

In 2019, he published An Unquiet Heart, a historical novel based on the life of the Russian poet, Sergei Yesenin, and his stormy love affair with the actress Zinaida Raikh.

His 2021 book, The War of Nerves, an account of the Cold War in terms of the psychology of the leaders on both sides, was shortlisted for the PEN/John Kenneth Galbraith Award for Non-fiction.

In 2022, Sixsmith co-wrote The Russia Conundrum: How the West Fell for Putin's Power Gambit, with the former oligarch and liberal opposition campaigner, Mikhail Khodorkovsky.

Sixsmith's 2024 book, Putin and the Return of History examines the West's plans for a unipolar world following the collapse of Soviet communism and how this contributed to Vladimir Putin's growing antagonism towards Washington and NATO.
