= Maternity home =

Housing program for pregnant women

A maternity home, or maternity housing program, is a form of supportive housing provided to pregnant women. Maternity housing programs support a woman in need of a stable home environment to reach her goals in a variety of areas including education, employment, financial stability, prenatal care, and more. There are over 400 maternity homes in the United States ranging in size and criteria for admittance. Staffing model is a primary way that maternity homes differ. The three major staffing models are houseparents (e.g. a married couple), live-in staff, and shift staff. Additionally, there are a limited number of maternity housing program who operate as a "shepherding" or "host" home. In the "host home" model, women are connected to screened households that offer to provide housing.

In other countries, a maternity home (sometimes called a Mother and Baby home) can refer to a temporary residence for pregnant women awaiting birth and mothers with newborn babies. Such women might include those who travel long distances for medical care, women whose pregnancies are a kept secret to the outside world, or high-risk pregnancies in need of frequent care. Maternity homes are not to be confused with maternity hospitals, or other facilities in which women give birth. Another sort of temporary housing for pregnant women are the maternity hostels that have become widespread in countries such as India where commercial surrogacy is big business.

== History ==
Maternity homes used to be known as homes for unwed mothers, as illegitimacy was (and in some places still is) a social taboo.

=== United States ===
The Salvation Army opened its first one in 1886. Other examples include Bethany Home in Minneapolis, later renamed Harriet Walker Hospital.

Prior to the 1980s, housing for pregnant women was offered in larger, institution-like settings that were strongly adoption-oriented. In these homes, confidentiality was a priority due to the social stigma around unwed births and the policies reflected the adoption laws and practices of the time. From these settings grew many of the narratives around maternity homes that continue to this day (e.g. women forced into adoption; preventing birth mothers from seeing their new borns; concealing placement details).

In the 1970s and 1980s, the adoption process began to grow in flexibility (e.g. changes to father notification, no longer making short-term placements of adopted babies into foster care, making use of probate court adoptions rather than solely via adoption agencies, increased inter-state adoptions.) Offering a more flexible housing option via a new model paralleled the more flexible adoption process. The large, institutional maternity homes began to close during this time.

In the early 1970s, Anne and Jim Pierson were pioneers in the host home model and publicly recognized by President Reagan for their family-style method of welcoming pregnant women. Shepherding or host homes grew in popularity in the 1980s and 1990s as a new type of housing resource. In this model, pregnant women in crisis pregnancies were housed within the spare bedrooms in the homes of passionate volunteers during their pregnancy. Several longstanding maternity homes used some version of a host home living environment as the launching point for developing a housing program. Additionally, many founders of longstanding maternity homes (and other pregnancy help organizations) began by welcoming women into their own home.

=== Ireland ===
Some maternity homes, such as the Bon Secours Mother and Baby Home in Tuam, were found to have provided highly substandard care.

=== United Kingdom ===
The American Red Cross sponsored maternity hostels in London after World War I.

=== Belgium ===
In Belgium, several maternity homes for unmarried pregnant women were operated during the twentieth century, many of them run by Roman Catholic religious orders. One of the most well-known institutions is Tamar, located in Lommel, in the province of Limburg. Tamar was founded in 1970 by the Sisters of the Infant Jesus (Zusters Kindsheid Jesu) and remained in operation until 2014..

Although Tamar was officially presented as a shelter providing care and guidance to young, unmarried mothers, former residents and adoptees have later alleged that the institution was involved in forced and coercive adoption practices. According to testimonies, young women were isolated from their families, placed under strict supervision by nuns, and pressured or compelled to relinquish their children for adoption, often without informed or freely given consent.

Allegations also include physical and psychological abuse, confinement, and cases of sexual abuse, as well as reports of forced sterilizations. These experiences have been documented in Belgian media, notably in the investigative podcast Children of the Church (Kinderen van de kerk) and the documentary series The Nuns (De Nonnen), which examined abuse and adoption practices within Catholic institutions, including Tamar.

One adoptee, identified as Peter in The Nuns, reported that he filed a criminal complaint regarding his own alleged abduction and forced adoption originating from Tamar. Belgian judicial authorities later dismissed the case on the grounds of statute of limitations, preventing further prosecution. The case has been cited in public debates on accountability and historical injustice related to maternity homes in Belgium.

== See also ==
- Crisis pregnancy center
