= Ann Fessler =

Ann Fessler is an author, filmmaker, video-installation artist, and a professor emerita at the Rhode Island School of Design. Her work reconciles the division between lived history and recorded history from a feminist perspective. She is especially known for her work dealing with adoption before legalized abortion and the experiences of women who surrendered children in the 1950s and 60s; particularly women who were seen as unfit mothers due to being a single parent.

== Education ==
Fessler graduated with an MFA from the School of Art's Photography division of the University of Arizona, where she received the Harold Jones Distinguished Alumni Award in 2007.

== Work ==
Ann Fessler's work utilizes the stories of women and focuses on how myths, stereotypes, and mass media images, can impact women's lives and their intimate relationships. Fessler's first installation project was her 1984 installation created for the Washington Project of the Arts on the subject of rape and violence against women. The installation appropriated images of French painter Nicolas Poussin's famous 17th-century painting, The Rape of the Sabine Women, to show how art history itself has become a silent conspirator in the subjugation of women and the equation of female gender with passive victimhood.

Fessler was 56 years old when she first met her biological mother. Using her personal adoption story as the basis of The Girls Who Went Away, she tells the story of over a hundred women who surrendered children for adoption prior to legalized abortion. In 2012 her documentary film, A Girl Like Her was released.

== Awards ==
Fessler is the recipient of visual art and film grants from the National Endowment for the Arts, the LEF Foundation, the Rhode Island Foundation, Rhode Island Council for the Humanities, Art Matters, N]; Maryland State Arts Council and the Rhode Island State Arts Council.

== Collections ==
Multiple bodies of her work have been widely exhibited in galleries, museums, and film festivals since the 1980s. Her work is included in the Whitney Museum of American Art, NY; Museum of Modern Art, NY; the Center for Creative Photography, Tucson; the Museum of Fine Arts, Houston; and the Rhode Island School of Design Museum.

== Bibliography ==
- Fessler, Ann (2006). The girls who went away: the hidden history of women who surrendered children for adoption in the decades before Roe v. Wade. New York: Penguin Press. ISBN 1594200947. OCLC 62593825.
