= Forced adoption =

Forced adoption refers to the practice of removing children from their biological families and placing them for adoption against the wishes of the parents, often with little or no consent. This practice has historically been a significant issue in various countries, where societal, governmental, and institutional pressures led to the forced separation of children from their families, especially in cases where the parents were marginalized, impoverished, or deemed unfit by authorities. The practice has been widely criticized for its violation of human rights and its long-lasting emotional and psychological effects on both children and parents.

== Forced assimilation ==
Removing children of ethnic minorities from their families to be adopted by those of the dominant ethnic group has been used as a method of forced assimilation. "Forcibly transferring children of [a] group to another group" is genocide according to the Genocide Convention. While this usually revolves around ethnicity, assimilating children of political minorities has also occurred.

=== Australia ===
The Stolen Generations in Australia involved Australian Aboriginal and Torres Strait Islander children, where over 60 years from 1910, it is estimated that as many as a third of Aboriginal children were taken from their families.

=== Canada ===
In Canada, the Canadian Indian residential school system involved First Nations, Métis and Inuit children, who often suffered severe abuse. The Sixties Scoop is a period when Canadian child welfare agents had the authority to take indigenous children from their families for placement in foster homes so they could be adopted by white families.

=== Chile ===
In the Selkʼnam genocide, Selkʼnam children were forcibly adopted into families of European descent to help cut off the connection to Selkʼnam identity.

=== China ===
As part of the persecution of Uyghurs in China, in 2017 alone at least half a million children were forcefully separated from their families, and placed in pre-school camps with prison-style surveillance systems and 10,000-volt electric fences.

=== India ===
Prostitution based castes such as the Bedia, Nat and Kanjar communities are involved in trafficking rings that kidnap girls from other communities and then raise them in their communities. Some of them are sent to Mumbai and Middle Eastern countries to work in dance bars and escort services to bolster the communities' income.

=== Poland ===
In German-occupied Poland, it is estimated that 200,000 Polish children with purportedly Aryan traits were removed from their families and given to German or Austrian couples, and only 25,000 returned to their families after the war.

=== South Sudan ===
Among nomadic groups, particularly the Murle people, children are abducted in raids against other tribes to be raised as their own. The practice is thought to be intended to increase the tribe's numbers. This includes the 2016 Gambela raid and 2017 Gambela raid.

=== Spain ===
Hispanic eugenics was pioneered by psychiatrist Antonio Vallejo-Nájera who proposed a link between Marxism and intellectual disability, leading to the thefts of many Spanish newborns and young children from their left-wing parents.

=== Ukraine ===
In April 2023, the Council of Europe voted overwhelmingly, with 87 in favor, 1 opposed, and 1 abstention, to deem the "deportations and forcible transfers of Ukrainian children and other civilians to Russian Federation or to Ukrainian territories temporarily occupied" as an act of genocide.

== Child welfare ==
Child welfare is often the rationale given for separating children from their parents. Family preservation is the perspective that it is better to help keep children at home with their families rather than in foster homes or institutions. How that should be balanced with the potential of harm to children is a matter of debate.

=== Abusive parents ===
Separating children from parents is most commonly used today for parental abuse of children.

=== Single mothers ===
From the 1950s to the 1970s in the anglosphere, babies were frequently taken away from unmarried mothers without any other reason simply because unmarried mothers were considered unsuitable parents, in what was known as the baby scoop era. In 2013, the Australian Prime Minister Julia Gillard apologized for the forced adoption in Australia of babies born to unwed mothers that occurred mostly in the twentieth century.

In Belgium from the end of the Second World War to the 1980s, the Catholic Church took in pregnant unmarried women and, during childbirth, some women were given general anesthesia while others had to wear a mask to prevent them from seeing their children. Some women were sterilized. About 30,000 such children were sold to adoptive parents for between 10,000 and 30,000 Belgian francs (roughly between €250 and €750) and sometimes much more. Many heavily pregnant girls were taken to France to give birth anonymously, as this was forbidden in Belgium. These girls and their children were later illegally smuggled back into Belgium, where their babies were forcibly removed. This was called Sous X practices.

There were also numerous instances of abuse in Belgian mother-and-child homes, such as the notorious Tamar home in Lommel. In this institution, children were taken from their mothers against their will and given up for adoption in exchange for donations, a practice that commodified human life. Furthermore, girls were sterilized against their will and girls were subjected to forced labor in a local carpet factory. These disturbing practices highlight the dark history of forced adoption in Belgium. The Belgian government has since acknowledged these injustices, but many individuals affected by forced adoptions continue to seek closure and reunification with their birth families.

In Ireland, forced adoptions were widespread, particularly from the 1940s to the 1980s. Many children were removed from single mothers, often under the assumption that these women were unfit to raise their children due to the social stigma surrounding unmarried mothers. Religious institutions, particularly the Catholic Church, played a significant role in these adoptions, operating institutions like mother and baby homes. These institutions often housed women who were pregnant out of wedlock, and after childbirth, their babies were taken for adoption, frequently without the mother's consent or knowledge. Many of these adoptions were carried out in secret, and records were not kept, making it difficult for families to reunite later. The Irish government has since acknowledged the wrongdoings of these institutions, and in 2021, the Irish Prime Minister issued an apology for the forced adoptions and the abuses committed in these homes. However, the trauma caused by these practices still affects many individuals today. The most well-known example of the forced adoptions was the Bon Secours Mother and Baby Home. This institution, located in Tuam, Ireland, became infamous for the discovery of a mass grave in 2014, where the remains of 796 infants were found.

=== Parents in poverty ===
In Switzerland, between the 1850s and the mid-20th century, hundreds of thousands of children mostly from poor families, as well as single parents, were removed from their parents by the authorities, and sent to work on farms, living with new families. They were known as contract children or Verdingkinder.

In South Korea, during the military dictatorship, the government pursued a "social purification" program that forced thousands of people off the streets into government-funded, privately run welfare centres. If they gave birth, the children were taken away to be adopted.

=== Parents belonging to minorities ===
A 2023 report from the South Australian Commissioner for Aboriginal Children and Young People warned of a new "stolen generation" finding Aboriginal children were increasingly being removed from their families with every other Aboriginal child in South Australia being subject to a one child protection notification in 2020-21 compared to one in 12 for non-Aboriginal children.

Norwegian Child Welfare Services are accused of disproportionately removing children of immigrant parents.

=== Parents with criminal records ===
In the United Kingdom, former judge Alan Goldsack called for the UK Government to forcibly remove children from 'criminal families' at birth and to place them for adoption. His remarks have been criticized and he has been accused of "criminalising babies".

== See also ==
- Adoption fraud
- Child harvesting
- Human trafficking
- International adoption
- International child abduction
- Interracial adoption
- Transculturation
