= Tamar (Lommel) =

Tamar was a maternity home for unmarried mothers and their children located in the Belgian city of Lommel, run by the Congregation of Kindsheid Jesu. It was established in 1970 on the attic of the Maria Middelares Hospital and moved in 1976 to its own building next to the hospital. Tamar was established to help young women who were pregnant out of wedlock. Tamar became notorious for its involvement in forced adoptions and unwanted sterilizations of young girls.

Tamar operated during a period in Belgium when adoption practices were often shrouded in secrecy and church-run institutions held significant influence over many aspects of society. One of the aspects of Tamar’s operations was the involvement in anonymous births in France, known as Sous X (literally "under X"), a practice that was legal in France but prohibited in Belgium. Many young women, often teenagers, were forced to travel to France to give birth anonymously. Afterward, the children were illegally brought back into Belgium and put up for adoption. This without consent from the mothers.

== Political and legal consequences ==
The full extent of the stories about Tamar became increasingly clear after the 2014 hearings in the Flemish Parliament about forced adoptions. During these hearings, the management of Tamar refused to apologize to the victims. Former director Josse Tips defended the adoptions, stating that they were largely carried out "at the request of the parents," a claim that was later contradicted by several testimonies from mothers who had been forced to relinquish their children

The 2023 podcast series Kinderen van de kerk (Children of the Church) delves deep into the stories about Tamar and shedding light on the church's influence on adoption practices. In this four-part series, the main accusations center on the belief that the Sisters at Tamar were involved in "laundering children" as a form of human trafficking. These children, often taken against the will of their mothers, were allegedly placed into adoptions that were profitable for the church-run institutions. The allegations suggest that money played a significant role in these decisions, furthering the idea that the children were treated as commodities. The organisation Tamar ended their operations in 2014.

== See also ==
- De nonnen
