= Lommel =

- City and municipality
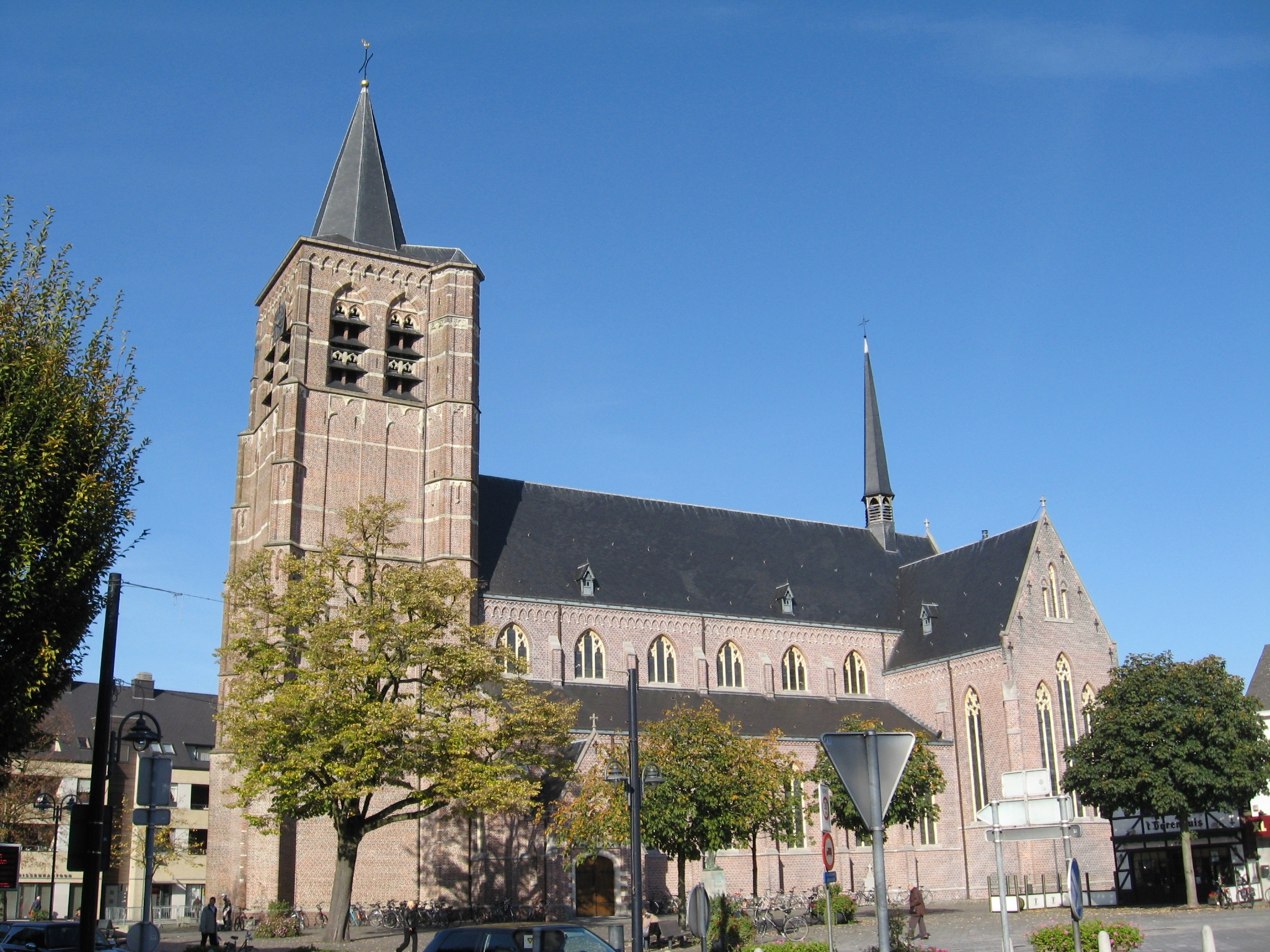
- St. Peter in Chains Church

- Flag Coat of arms

- Location of Lommel in Limburg
- Interactive map of Lommel
- Location in Belgium
- Coordinates: 51°14′N 05°18′E
- Country: Belgium
- Community: Flemish Community
- Region: Flemish Region
- Province: Limburg
- Arrondissement: Maaseik

Government
  - Mayor: Bob Nijs (CD&V)
  - Governing parties: CD&V, N-VA

Area
  - Total: 102.28 km^{2} (39.49 sq mi)

Population (2018-01-01)
  - Total: 34,044
  - Density: 332.85/km^{2} (862.08/sq mi)
- Postal codes: 3920
- NIS code: 72020
- Area codes: 011
- Website: www.lommel.be

Lommel (Dutch pronunciation: [ˈlɔməl]) is a municipality and city in the Belgian province of Limburg. Lying in the Kempen, it has about 34,000 inhabitants and is part of the arrondissement of Maaseik.

Besides the residential town, Lommel also has a number of nature reserves, such as the nature reserve De Watering, the Lommel Sahara, and numerous forests and heathlands. Lommel is the third shopping city in Belgian Limburg with a commercial and shopping center De Singel. Some sand mining quarries are transformed into nature reserves and recreational areas, including Lommel Sahara.

The city of Lommel is in the watershed of the basins of the Scheldt, and Meuse, and within these basins Nete Dommel respectively.

Tamar, a maternity home for pregnant girls and unmarried mothers and their children run by the Congregation of Kindsheid Jesu, is located in Lommel. Despite its religious mission to help young women, Tamar was notorious for numerous scandals, including forced adoptions, unwanted sterilizations, and abuse of the women placed in its care.

== Language ==
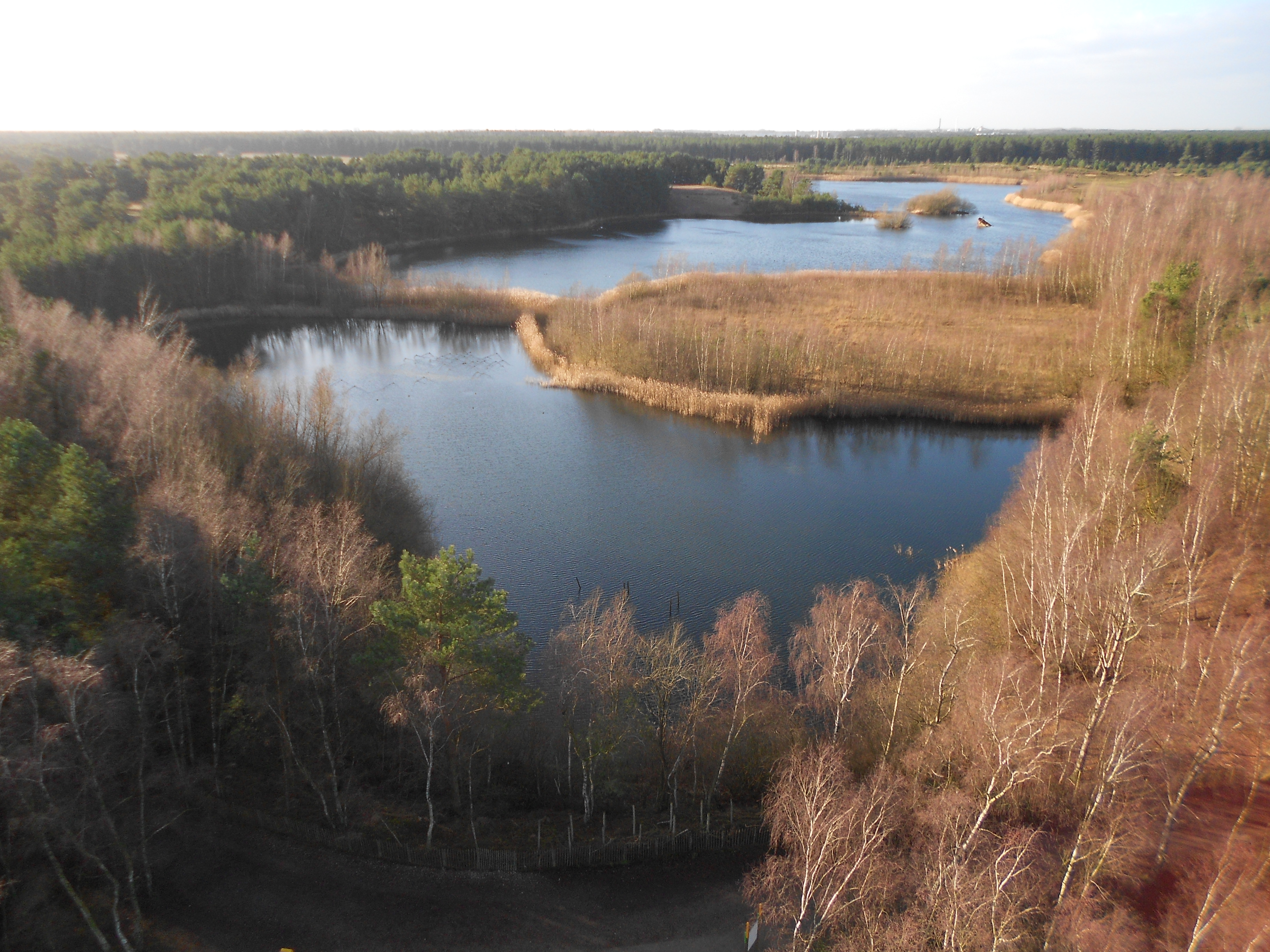
Lommelse Sahara

The dialect of Lommel is, despite its location in Limburg, part of the East Brabantian, not the Limburgish dialects, reflecting the particular history of the city.

== Etymology ==
The name comes from Loemelo. Loem means moist, swampy and Lo is forest or woodland.

== Demographic development ==
All historical data relating to the current municipality, including towns such as arose after the merger of January 1, 1977.

Historical population

Year	Pop.	±% p.a.
1846	2,486	—
1866	3,009	+0.96%
1880	3,042	+0.08%
1890	3,252	+0.67%
1900	4,431	+3.14%
1910	7,022	+4.71%
1920	7,811	+1.07%
1930	9,666	+2.15%

Year	Pop.	±% p.a.
1947	13,487	+1.98%
1961	17,923	+2.05%
1970	21,984	+2.30%
1981	25,412	+1.33%
1990	27,427	+0.85%
2000	30,433	+1.05%
2010	32,917	+0.79%
2015	33,852	+0.56%

== Politics ==
=== Structure ===
The city of Lommel is located in the arrondissement of Maaseik and the Limburg parliamentary constituency (which coincides with the province of Limburg).

Lommel		Supranational	National	Community	Region	Province	Arrondissement	County district	Canton	Municipality
Administration	Level	European Union	Belgium	Flanders		Limburg	Maaseik	Limburg		Lommel
Administration	Executive	European Commission	Federal Government	Flemish Government		Provincial Executive				Mayor
Administration	Elected body	European Parliament	Chamber of Representatives	Flemish Parliament		Provincial Council				Municipal Council
Electoral area		Dutch-speaking electoral college	Limburg	Limburg		Hasselt-Tongeren-Maaseik	Maaseik	Neerpelt	Neerpelt	Lommel
Elections		Europe	Federal	Regional		Provincial				Municipal

=== List of mayors of Lommel ===
- 1808 – 1813: Joannes Aerts, Catholic
- 1813 – 1847: William Karel Koek Court, Catholic
- 1847 – 1857: Jan Daels, Catholic
- 1857 – 1861: Jan Van Leemput, Catholic
- 1861 – 1863: Henry Alen, Catholic
- 1863 – 1872: Peter Slegers, Catholic
- 1872 – 1879: Peter Stevens, Catholic
- 1879 – 1885: Jan Alen, Catholic
- 1885 – 1890: Jan Vanden Boer, Catholic
- 1891 – 1904: Peter Senders, Catholic
- 1904 – 1921: François Van Ham, Catholic
- 1921 – 1923: John Bouly, Catholic
- 1924 – 1927: Peter Joosten, Catholic
- 1927 – 1941: Joseph Tournier, liberal Catholics
- 1941 – 1944: Peter Luykx, Flemish nationalist
- 1944 – 1945: Joseph Tournier, liberal Catholics
- 1945 – 1958: Henri Van Reempts, Catholic
- 1959 – 1979: René Verhoeven, Catholic
- 1979 – 1988: Staff Matthijs, Catholic
- 1989 – 2006: Louis Vanvelthoven, socialist
- 2007 – 2018: Peter Vanvelthoven, socialist
- 2019–present: Bob Nijs, Catholic

=== Results municipal elections since 1976 ===
Partij	10-10-1976		10-10-1982		9-10-1988		9-10-1994		8-10-2000		8-10-2006		14-10-2012	
Stemmen / Zetels	%	27	%	29	%	29	%	29	%	31	%	31	%	31
CVP^{1}/CD&V^{2}	49,18^{1}	14	38,03^{1}	13	33,22^{1}	11	26,79^{1}	9	25,24^{1}	9	-		19,68^{2}	7
CD&V+N-VA	-		-		-		-		-		28,55	9	-	
VU^{1}/VU&ID^{2}	9,72^{1}	2	10,96^{1}	3	9,08^{1}	2	-		3,73^{2}	0	-		-	
N-VA	-		-		-		-		-		-		17,20	6
PVV^{1}/VLD^{2}/VLD-VIVANT^{3}/Open Vld^{4}	9,56^{1}	2	6,55^{1}	1	11,56^{1}	3	13,18^{2}	3	12,69^{2}	4	10,90^{3}	3	9,29^{4}	2
SP	31,55	9	37,57	12	39,51	13	46,21	16	47,75	17	-		-	
sp.a-spirit	-		-		-		-		-		42,44	15	-	
Burgemeester	-		-		-		-		-		-		40,33	15
AGALEV^{1}/Groen^{2}	-		-		3,2^{1}	0	-		-		-		4,34^{2}	0
PVDA	-		4,55	0	3,44	0	4,11	0	-		-		-	
Vlaams Blok^{1}/Vlaams Belang^{2}	-		-		-		-		7,17^{1}	1	9,77^{2}	2	3,98^{2}	0
LGB	-		2,34	0	-		-		-		-		-	
BOOS	-		-		-		7,86	1	-		-		-	
HOOP	-		-		-		1,85	0	-		-		-	
LEL	-		-		-		-		3,42	0	-		-	
AKTIEF	-		-		-		-		-		8,33	2	5,19	1
Totaal stemmen	14873		16710		18306		19495		20598		20452		21465	
Opkomst %					97,07		95,9		95,32		95,71		93,70	
Blanco en ongeldig %	3,68		4,84		4,23		4,41		3,71		4,2		2,47	

seats formed coalition 'bold' printed

== Sporting events ==
Since 2017 the European Open a Snooker ranking tournament of the World Snooker Tour took place in Lommel.

Lommel is home to the Belgian Motocross Grand Prix, part of the Motocross World Championship. The track at Lommel is among the most famous in the motocross world and is known for its deep and unforgiving sand surface. Notable motocross racers such as Jeffrey Herlings and Ryan Villopoto have said that Lommel is the most physically demanding motocross track to ride in the world, and many top European motocross riders live in or around the city to hone their skills at the track.

== Notable people ==
- Kevin Hulsmans, road bicycle racer
- Peter Luykx, federal representative
- Peter Maes, former footballer, coach of Sporting Lokeren
- Roy Meeus (born 1989), professional footballer
- Wim Mennes, footballer
- Pieter Mertens, road bicycle racer
- Steve Ramon, motocross world champion
- Kathleen Smet, triathlete
- Dirk Swartenbroekx, DJ Buscemi
- Johan Vansummeren, road bicycle racer
- Marcel Vanthilt, musician, TV presenter
- Louis Vanvelthoven, honorary-mayor, former chairman of the Flemish Parliament
- Peter Vanvelthoven, mayor, former Belgian Minister for Employment and Informatisation
- Steven Van Broeckhoven, windsurfer, two-time champion on the European Freestyle Pro Tour
- Stefano Marzo, footballer
- Zizou Bergs, Professional Tennis Player

== See also ==
- Lommel Proving Grounds – Lommel Proving Grounds
- Lommel German war cemetery – Located along N764, on the road from Lommel to Leopoldsburg is the largest German military cemetery in Western Europe outside Germany itself. Established after World War II, the 16 ha cemetery holds 39,102 burials, mainly from World War II.
- RC Murphy's Lommel – Rugby club
