= List of accolades received by Dallas Buyers Club =

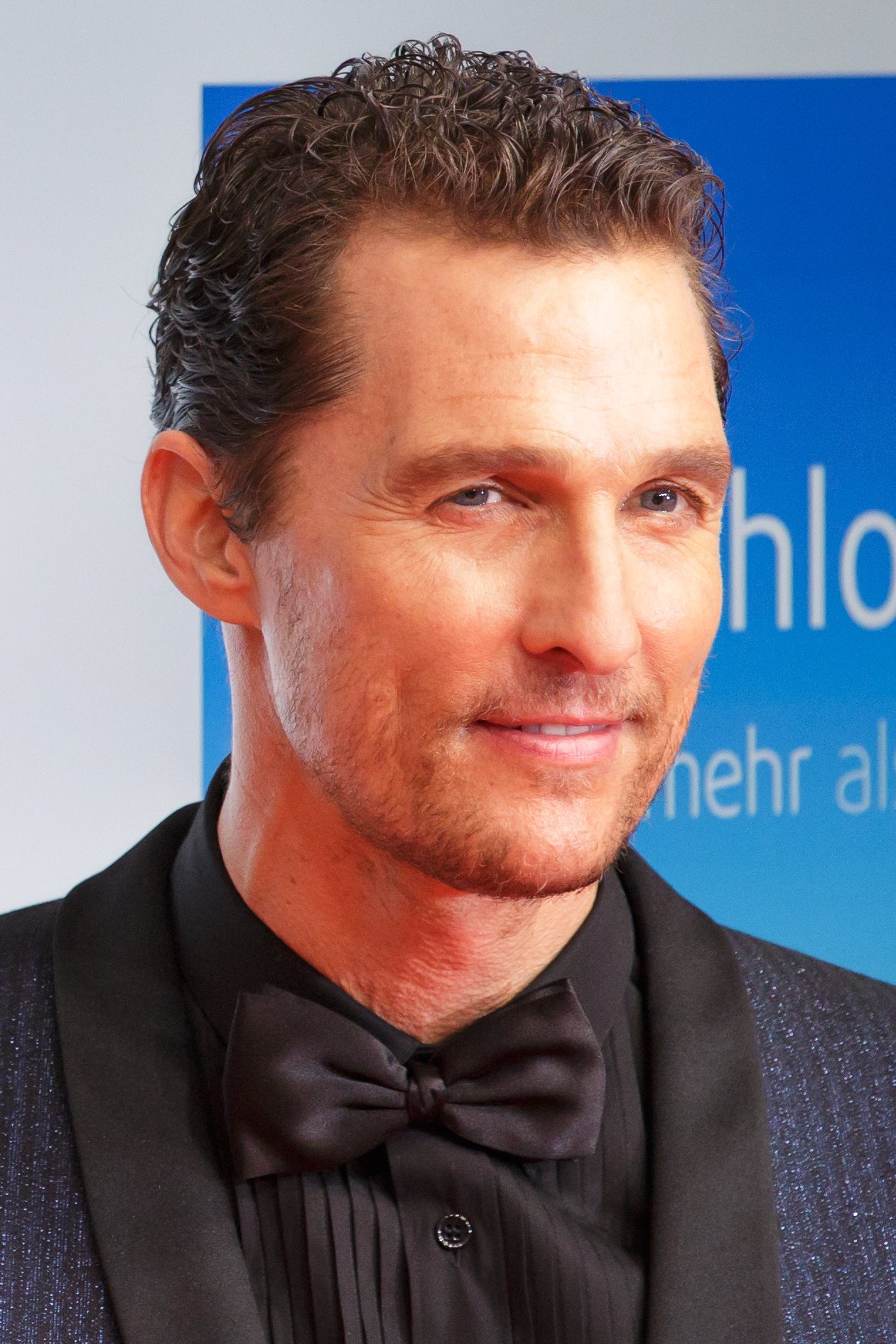
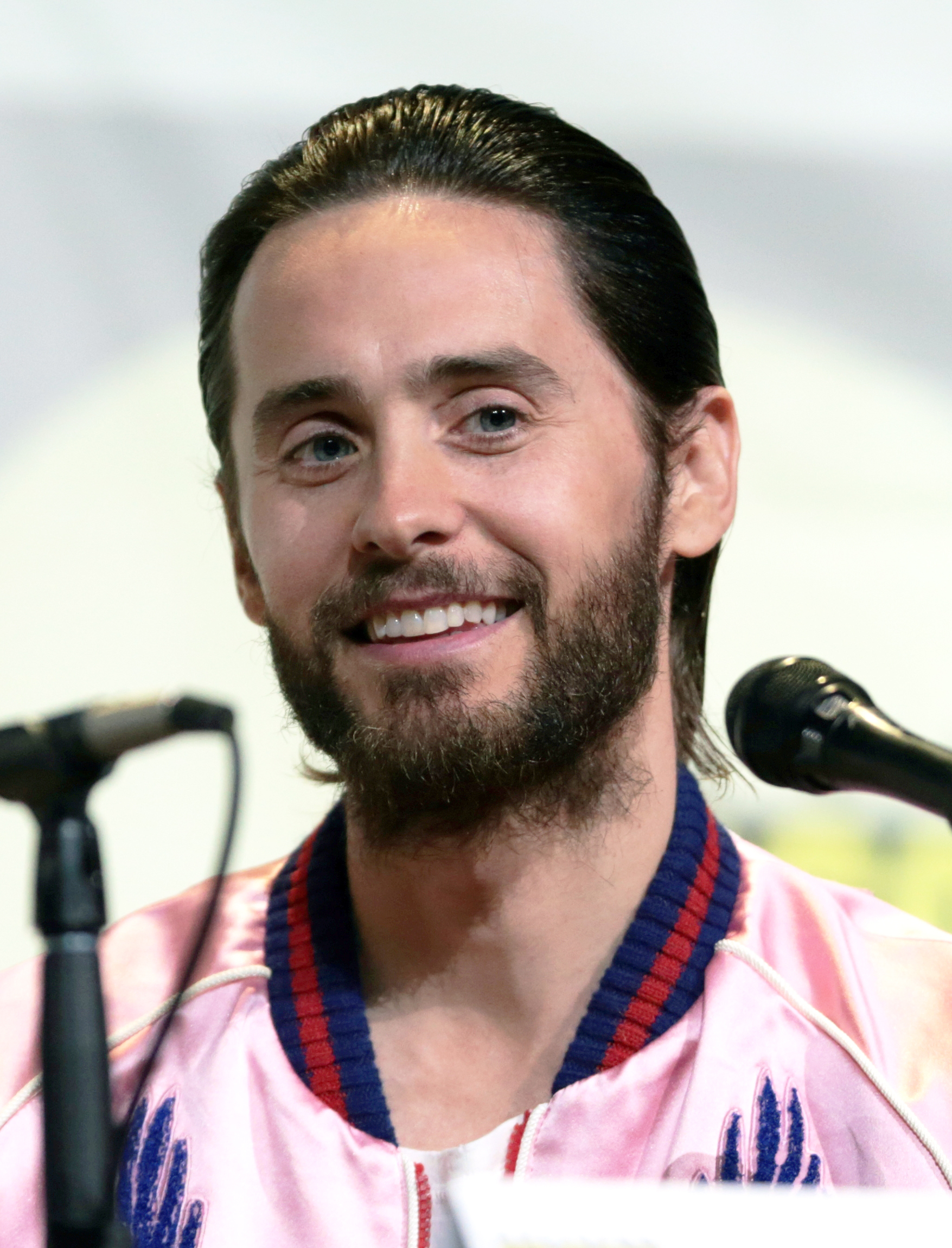
- Matthew McConaughey (left) and Jared Leto's (right) performances were praised, receiving several awards and nominations
Accolades
Award	Won	Nominated
AACTA Awards	0	2
Academy Awards	3	6
African-American Film Critics Association	2	2
Alliance of Women Film Journalists	2	2
Austin Film Critics Association	2	2
Boston Society of Film Critics	0	1
Broadcast Film Critics Association	2	3
Casting Society of America	1	1
Chicago Film Critics Association	1	2
Costume Designers Guild	0	1
Dallas–Fort Worth Film Critics Association	3	3
Detroit Film Critics Society	2	2
Dorian Awards	1	4
Florida Film Critics Circle	1	1
GLAAD Media Award	0	1
Golden Globe Awards	2	2
Goldene Kamera	1	1
Gotham Awards	1	1
Guardian Film Awards	0	1
Hollywood Film Awards	2	2
Houston Film Critics Society	1	3
Independent Spirit Awards	2	2
Irish Film & Television Academy	0	1
Kerrang! Awards	0	1
London Film Critics' Circle	0	1
Los Angeles Film Critics Association	1	1
Mill Valley Film Festival	1	2
MTV Movie & TV Awards	1	4
NAACP Image Awards	0	1
National Board of Review	1	1
National Society of Film Critics	0	1
New York Film Critics Circle	1	1
New York Film Critics Online	2	2
Online Film Critics Society	0	1
Palm Springs International Film Festival	1	1
Producers Guild of America Awards	0	1
Rome Film Festival	5	6
San Diego Film Critics Society	1	2
San Francisco Film Critics Circle	0	2
San Sebastián International Film Festival	1	1
Santa Barbara International Film Festival	1	1
Satellite Awards	2	2
Screen Actors Guild Awards	2	3
St. Louis Film Critics Association	1	2
Toronto Film Critics Association	1	2
Vancouver Film Critics Circle	1	2
Village Voice Film Poll	0	1
Washington D.C. Area Film Critics Association	1	2
Writers Guild of America Awards	0	1
- Total number of awards and nominations
Totals	53	91
- References

Dallas Buyers Club is a 2013 American biographical drama film directed by Jean-Marc Vallée based on a screenplay written by Craig Borten and Melisa Wallack. Matthew McConaughey stars as Ron Woodroof, an AIDS patient who smuggles unapproved AIDS drug treatments into Texas and establishes the titular club where he distributes them amongst other AIDS sufferers whilst opposed by the Food and Drug Administration. Jared Leto and Jennifer Garner feature in supporting roles.

Dallas Buyers Club premiered at the Toronto International Film Festival on September 7, 2013. Focus Features initially gave the film a limited release at nine theaters on November 1 before expanding it on November 22 to over 600 theaters in the United States and Canada. The film grossed a worldwide total of over $55 million on a production budget of $5 million. Rotten Tomatoes, a review aggregator, surveyed 255 reviews and judged 93% to be positive.

Dallas Buyers Club received awards and nominations in a variety of categories with particular praise for the performances of McConaughey and Leto. At the 86th Academy Awards, the film received six nominations, including Best Picture, Best Original Screenplay, Best Actor for McConaughey, and Best Supporting Actor for Leto. McConaughey and Leto went on to win their respective categories—only the fifth film in Oscars history to win both awards. Hairstylist Adruitha Lee, and makeup artist Robin Mathews won for Best Makeup and Hairstyling. Mathews' makeup budget for the film was only $250. At the 71st Golden Globe Awards, McConaughey won for Best Actor – Motion Picture Drama, and Leto won for Best Supporting Actor – Motion Picture.

At the Screen Actors Guild Awards the film had three nominations, winning Best Actor for McConaughey and Best Supporting Actor for Leto. Borten and Wallack's screenplay was also nominated for Best Original Screenplay at the Writers Guild of America Awards. The National Board of Review named Dallas Buyers Club one of the top ten independent films of 2013.

== Accolades ==
Accolades	Date of ceremony	Category	Recipient(s)	Result
Academy Awards	March 2, 2014	Best Picture	Robbie Brenner and Rachel Winter	Nominated
Academy Awards	March 2, 2014	Best Actor	Matthew McConaughey	Won
Academy Awards	March 2, 2014	Best Supporting Actor	Jared Leto	Won
Academy Awards	March 2, 2014	Best Original Screenplay	Craig Borten and Melisa Wallack	Nominated
Academy Awards	March 2, 2014	Best Film Editing	John Mac McMurphy and Martin Pensa	Nominated
Academy Awards	March 2, 2014	Best Makeup and Hairstyling	Adruitha Lee and Robin Mathews	Won
African-American Film Critics Association	January 31, 2014	Top Ten Films	Dallas Buyers Club	Won
African-American Film Critics Association	January 31, 2014	Best Supporting Actor	Jared Leto	Won
Alliance of Women Film Journalists	December 19, 2013	Best Actor	Matthew McConaughey	Won
Alliance of Women Film Journalists	December 19, 2013	Best Supporting Actor	Jared Leto	Won
Austin Film Critics Association	December 17, 2013	AFCA 2013 Top Ten Films	Dallas Buyers Club	9th Place
Austin Film Critics Association	December 17, 2013	Best Supporting Actor	Jared Leto	Won
Australian Academy of Cinema and Television Arts Awards	January 10, 2014	Best Actor – International	Matthew McConaughey	Nominated
Australian Academy of Cinema and Television Arts Awards	January 10, 2014	Best Supporting Actor – International	Jared Leto	Nominated
Boston Society of Film Critics	December 8, 2013	Best Supporting Actor	Jared Leto	Runner-up
Broadcast Film Critics Association	January 16, 2014	Best Film	Dallas Buyers Club	Nominated
Broadcast Film Critics Association	January 16, 2014	Best Actor	Matthew McConaughey	Won
Broadcast Film Critics Association	January 16, 2014	Best Supporting Actor	Jared Leto	Won
Casting Society of America	January 22, 2015	Studio or Independent Drama	Kerry Barden, Paul Schnee, Rich Delia, Tracy Kilpatrick	Won
Chicago Film Critics Association	December 16, 2013	Best Actor	Matthew McConaughey	Nominated
Chicago Film Critics Association	December 16, 2013	Best Supporting Actor	Jared Leto	Won
Costume Designers Guild	February 22, 2014	Excellence in Period Film	Kurt & Bart	Nominated
Dallas–Fort Worth Film Critics Association	December 16, 2013	Top Ten Films	Dallas Buyers Club	5th Place
Dallas–Fort Worth Film Critics Association	December 16, 2013	Best Actor	Matthew McConaughey	1st Place
Dallas–Fort Worth Film Critics Association	December 16, 2013	Best Supporting Actor	Jared Leto	1st Place
Detroit Film Critics Society	December 13, 2013	Best Actor	Matthew McConaughey	Won
Detroit Film Critics Society	December 13, 2013	Best Supporting Actor	Jared Leto	Won
Dorian Awards	January 21, 2014	Film of the Year	Dallas Buyers Club	Nominated
Dorian Awards	January 21, 2014	Film Performance of the Year – Actor	Jared Leto	Nominated
Dorian Awards	January 21, 2014	Film Performance of the Year – Actor	Matthew McConaughey	Won
Dorian Awards	January 21, 2014	LGBT Film of the Year	Dallas Buyers Club	Nominated
Florida Film Critics Circle	December 18, 2013	Best Supporting Actor	Jared Leto	Won
GLAAD Media Awards	May 3, 2014	Outstanding Film – Wide Release	Dallas Buyers Club	Nominated
Golden Globe Awards	January 12, 2014	Best Actor – Motion Picture Drama	Matthew McConaughey	Won
Golden Globe Awards	January 12, 2014	Best Supporting Actor – Motion Picture	Jared Leto	Won
Goldene Kamera	February 1, 2014	Best International Actor	Matthew McConaughey	Won
Gotham Awards	December 2, 2013	Best Actor	Matthew McConaughey	Won
Guardian Film Awards	March 6, 2014	Best Supporting Actor	Jared Leto	Nominated
Hollywood Film Awards	October 20, 2013	Best Actor	Matthew McConaughey	Won
Hollywood Film Awards	October 20, 2013	Breakout Performance	Jared Leto	Won
Houston Film Critics Society	December 15, 2013	Best Picture	Dallas Buyers Club	Nominated
Houston Film Critics Society	December 15, 2013	Best Actor	Matthew McConaughey	Nominated
Houston Film Critics Society	December 15, 2013	Best Supporting Actor	Jared Leto	Won
Independent Spirit Awards	March 1, 2014	Best Male Lead	Matthew McConaughey	Won
Independent Spirit Awards	March 1, 2014	Best Supporting Male	Jared Leto	Won
Irish Film & Television Awards	April 5, 2014	Best International Actor	Matthew McConaughey	Nominated
Kerrang! Awards	June 12, 2014	Best Film	Dallas Buyers Club	Nominated
London Film Critics' Circle	February 2, 2014	Best Supporting Actor	Jared Leto	Nominated
Los Angeles Film Critics Association	December 8, 2013	Best Supporting Actor	Jared Leto	Won
Mill Valley Film Festival	October 11, 2013	Audience Favorite – US Cinema	Dallas Buyers Club	Runner-up
Mill Valley Film Festival	October 11, 2013	Spotlight Award	Jared Leto	Won
MTV Movie & TV Awards	April 13, 2014	Best Male Performance	Matthew McConaughey	Nominated
MTV Movie & TV Awards	April 13, 2014	Best On-Screen Duo	Matthew McConaughey, and Jared Leto	Nominated
MTV Movie & TV Awards	April 13, 2014	Best On-Screen Transformation	Jared Leto	Won
MTV Movie & TV Awards	April 13, 2014	Best On-Screen Transformation	Matthew McConaughey	Nominated
NAACP Image Awards	February 21, 2014	Outstanding Independent Motion Picture	Dallas Buyers Club	Nominated
National Board of Review	December 4, 2013	Top Independent Films	Dallas Buyers Club	Won
National Society of Film Critics	January 4, 2014	Best Supporting Actor	Jared Leto	Runner-up
New York Film Critics Circle	December 3, 2013	Best Supporting Actor	Jared Leto	Won
New York Film Critics Online	December 8, 2013	Best Supporting Actor	Jared Leto	Won
New York Film Critics Online	December 8, 2013	Best Films of 2013	Dallas Buyers Club	Won
Online Film Critics Society	December 16, 2013	Best Supporting Actor	Jared Leto	Nominated
Palm Springs International Film Festival	January 4, 2014	Desert Palm Achievement Award	Matthew McConaughey	Won
Producers Guild of America Awards	January 19, 2014	Best Theatrical Motion Picture	Robbie Brenner and Rachel Winter	Nominated
Rome Film Festival	November 16, 2013	Audience Award	Dallas Buyers Club	Won
Rome Film Festival	November 16, 2013	Best Actor	Matthew McConaughey	Won
Rome Film Festival	November 16, 2013	Best Cinematography	Yves Bélanger	Won
Rome Film Festival	November 16, 2013	Best Film	Dallas Buyers Club	Nominated
Rome Film Festival	November 16, 2013	Golden Butterfly	Dallas Buyers Club	Won
Rome Film Festival	November 16, 2013	Vanity Fair International Award for Cinematic Excellence	Dallas Buyers Club	Won
San Diego Film Critics Society	December 11, 2013	Best Actor	Matthew McConaughey	Nominated
San Diego Film Critics Society	December 11, 2013	Best Supporting Actor	Jared Leto	Won
San Francisco Film Critics Circle	December 15, 2013	Best Actor	Matthew McConaughey	Nominated
San Francisco Film Critics Circle	December 15, 2013	Best Supporting Actor	Jared Leto	Nominated
San Sebastián International Film Festival	September 28, 2013	Sebastiane Award	Dallas Buyers Club	Won
Santa Barbara International Film Festival	February 4, 2014	Virtuosos Award	Jared Leto	Won
Satellite Awards	February 23, 2014	Best Actor – Motion Picture	Matthew McConaughey	Won
Satellite Awards	February 23, 2014	Best Supporting Actor – Motion Picture	Jared Leto	Won
Screen Actors Guild Awards	January 18, 2014	Outstanding Performance by a Cast in a Motion Picture	Jennifer Garner, Jared Leto, Matthew McConaughey, Denis O'Hare, Dallas Roberts, and Steve Zahn	Nominated
Screen Actors Guild Awards	January 18, 2014	Outstanding Performance by a Male Actor in a Leading Role	Matthew McConaughey	Won
Screen Actors Guild Awards	January 18, 2014	Outstanding Performance by a Male Actor in a Supporting Role	Jared Leto	Won
St. Louis Gateway Film Critics Association	December 16, 2013	Best Actor	Matthew McConaughey	Runner-up
St. Louis Gateway Film Critics Association	December 16, 2013	Best Supporting Actor	Jared Leto	Won
Toronto Film Critics Association	December 17, 2013	Best Actor	Matthew McConaughey	Runner-up
Toronto Film Critics Association	December 17, 2013	Best Supporting Actor	Jared Leto	Won
Vancouver Film Critics Circle	January 7, 2014	Best Actor	Matthew McConaughey	Nominated
Vancouver Film Critics Circle	January 7, 2014	Best Supporting Actor	Jared Leto	Won
Village Voice Film Poll	December 17, 2013	Best Supporting Actor	Jared Leto	Nominated
Washington D.C. Area Film Critics Association	December 9, 2013	Best Actor	Matthew McConaughey	Nominated
Washington D.C. Area Film Critics Association	December 9, 2013	Best Supporting Actor	Jared Leto	Won
Writers Guild of America Awards	February 1, 2014	Best Original Screenplay	Craig Borten, and Melisa Wallack	Nominated

== See also ==
- 2013 in film
