= Candace Pert =

American neuroscientist (1946–2013)

Candace Beebe Pert
- Born: June 26, 1946; Manhattan, New York City
- Died: September 12, 2013 (aged 67); Potomac, Maryland
- Known for: Opioid receptor, mind-body medicine pioneer, HIV treatment
- Scientific career
- Fields: Neuroscience
- Workplaces: National Institutes of Health; Georgetown University

Candace Beebe Pert (June 26, 1946 – September 12, 2013) was an American neuroscientist and pharmacologist who discovered the opioid receptor, the cellular binding site for endorphins in the brain.

== Early life and education ==
She was born on June 26, 1946, in Manhattan, New York City.

She completed her undergraduate studies in biology, cum laude in 1970 from Bryn Mawr College in Pennsylvania.

== Academic career ==
In 1974, Candace Pert earned a Ph.D. in pharmacology from Johns Hopkins University School of Medicine, where she worked in the laboratory of Solomon Snyder and discovered the brain's opiate receptor.

Pert conducted a National Institutes of Health Postdoctoral Fellowship with the Department of Pharmacology at the Johns Hopkins University School of Medicine from 1974 to 1975. She conducted research at the National Institute of Mental Health from 1975 to 1987.

In 1983, she became the Chief of the Section on Brain Biochemistry of the Clinical Neuroscience Branch, the only female chief at NIMH.

She left to found and direct a private biotech laboratory in 1987.

Pert was a research professor in the department of physiology and biophysics at Georgetown University School of Medicine in Washington, D.C.

In her latter years, she was with RAPID Pharmaceuticals.

In 1997 she published her book Molecules of Emotion.

She appeared as one of the experts in Bill Moyers 1993 PBS video production, "Healing and the Mind", and in the 2004 film What the #$*! Do We Know!?.

She died on September 12, 2013, in Potomac, Maryland.

=== Peptides work ===
Pert published over 250 scientific articles on peptides and their receptors and the role of these neuropeptides in the immune system.

She held a number of patents for modified peptides in the treatment of psoriasis, Alzheimer's disease, chronic fatigue syndrome, stroke and head trauma.

One of her modified peptides, Peptide T, had been considered for the treatment of AIDS and neuroAIDS. A placebo-controlled, three-site, 200+ patient NIH-funded clinical trial which was principally concerned with possible neurocognitive improvements, was conducted between 1990 and 1995. It was found that the effect of Peptide T was not significantly different from that of placebo on the primary end points of the study - various aspects of brain function. However, Peptide T was associated with improved performance (memory and learning) in the subgroup of patients with more severe cognitive impairment. A long-delayed analysis of antiviral effects from the NIH study showed peripheral viral load (combined plasma and serum) was significantly reduced in the DAPTA-treated group. An eleven-person study of Peptide T effects on cellular viral load showed reductions in infected monocyte reservoir to undetectable levels in most of the patients. Pert was developing orally active peptide anti-inflammatory treatments for pain and Alzheimer's Disease and studies for treatment of HIV persistent viral reservoirs.

== Lecturing and media ==
Pert lectured worldwide on peptide and other subjects, including her theories on emotions and mind-body communication.

Her popular book, Molecules of Emotion: Why You Feel the Way You Feel, (Scribner, 1997) expounded on her research and theories.

She was featured in Washingtonian magazine (December 2001) as one of Washington's fifty "Best and Brightest" individuals.

The Sydney Morning Herald profiled Pert in 2004:

As a mere graduate student, in 1972 Candace Pert discovered the brain’s opiate receptor – the cellular site where the body’s painkillers and "bliss-makers", the endorphins – bond with cells to weave their magic.

Pert's discovery led to a revolution in neuroscience, helping open the door to the "information-based" model of the brain which is now replacing the old "structuralist" model...

Molecules of Emotion begins as an eye-opener into the intellectual warfare of modern scientific discovery – the gamesmanship, the sly purloining of others' results – but also into the round-the-clock work, the exhilaration of a shared breakthrough, and the slow, painful rise of women in the scientific professions.

The book concludes with the author integrating the science she pioneered with the holistic "energy medicines" which work on the same principles – till now without scientific rationales.

Pert's experimental drug Peptide T is referenced as an alternative HIV/AIDS treatment in the 2013 film Dallas Buyers Club.

=== Event appearances ===
- Pert received the first time award of the Theophrastus Paracelsus Foundation in Holistic Medicine for her pioneering work in the area of psychoneuroimmunology (St Gallen, Switzerland) on April 12, 2008.

=== Other appearances ===
In 2004, Pert was an interview partner in the documentary film What the Bleep Do We Know!? where she appeared several times. She also appeared in the 2009 Louise Hay movie You Can Heal Your Life.

== Books ==
- Molecules Of Emotion: The Science Between Mind-Body Medicine Scribner (1999), ISBN 0-684-84634-9
- Everything You Need to Know to Feel Go(o)d, with Nancy Marriott, Hay House, Inc. (2006), ISBN 1-4019-1059-9
- Candace Pert: Genius, Greed, and Madness in the World of Science, Pamela Ryckman (2023), ISBN 978-0-306-83146-1 (hardcover); 978-0-306-83148-5 (ebook)
