= Craig Borten =

American screenwriter

- Born: September 16, 1965 (age 59); Pennsylvania, U.S.
- Occupation: Screenwriter

Craig Borten (born September 16, 1965) is an American screenwriter. Borten is best known for his Oscar-nominated script for the 2013 film Dallas Buyers Club. In addition to his nomination for Academy Award for Best Original Screenplay, Borten also received a nomination for Writers Guild of America Award for Best Original Screenplay.

== Early life and education ==
Borten was born and grew up in Pennsylvania. He attended Plymouth-Whitemarsh High School in Plymouth Meeting, Pennsylvania and then Syracuse University in Syracuse, New York.

== Career ==
=== Dallas Buyers Club ===
After Syracuse University, Borten moved to Los Angeles to pursue a career in filmmaking. After hearing about Ron Woodroof, the original founder of the "Dallas Buyers Club" for the distribution of unapproved HIV medications, in the early 1990s, and interviewing Woodroof in 1992, Borten decided to write a screenplay about Woodroof and his buyers club. In 1996, he sold the script for Dallas Buyers Club to a production company that was later dissolved.

In 2001, he rewrote the script with Melisa Wallack, and they sold it to Universal Studios, with Marc Forster to direct the film and Brad Pitt to star in it. The production fell through again, however, which Borten described as "a death blow". In 2009, however, Borten and Wallack were able to reclaim their rights to the script, and producer Robbie Brenner cast Matthew McConaughey to star in it, and secured funding for the film's production. The film was released in 2013, more than two decades after Borten met Woodroof, and more than 15 years after Borten sold his first version of the script. Dallas Buyers Club received numerous accolades, including Academy Award nominations for Best Picture and Best Original Screenplay.

=== Other works ===
Borten's screenwriting credits since 2013 include other biopics, including the survival-drama The 33 and the Netflix film Sergio.

His upcoming projects include The War and Treaty with John Legend and Gilbert Films, and Titan: The Life of John D. Rockefeller, a biopic about the life of John D. Rockefeller with Lasse Hallström attached as director.
