= 20th Screen Actors Guild Awards =

- Awarded for: Outstanding motion picture and primetime television performances
- Date: January 18, 2014
- Location: Shrine Auditorium; Los Angeles, California
- Country: United States
- Presented by: SAG-AFTRA
- Website: www.sagawards.org

Television/radio coverage
- Network: TNT and TBS simultaneous broadcast

The 20th Annual Screen Actors Guild Awards, awarded by SAG-AFTRA and honoring the best achievements in film and television performances for the year 2013, were presented on January 18, 2014, at the Shrine Exposition Center in Los Angeles, California. The ceremony was broadcast simultaneously by TNT and TBS 8:00 p.m. EST / 5:00 p.m. PST and the nominees were announced on December 11, 2013.

Rita Moreno was announced as the 2013 SAG Life Achievement Award honoree on July 22, 2013.

== Winners and nominees ==
Winners are listed first and highlighted in boldface.

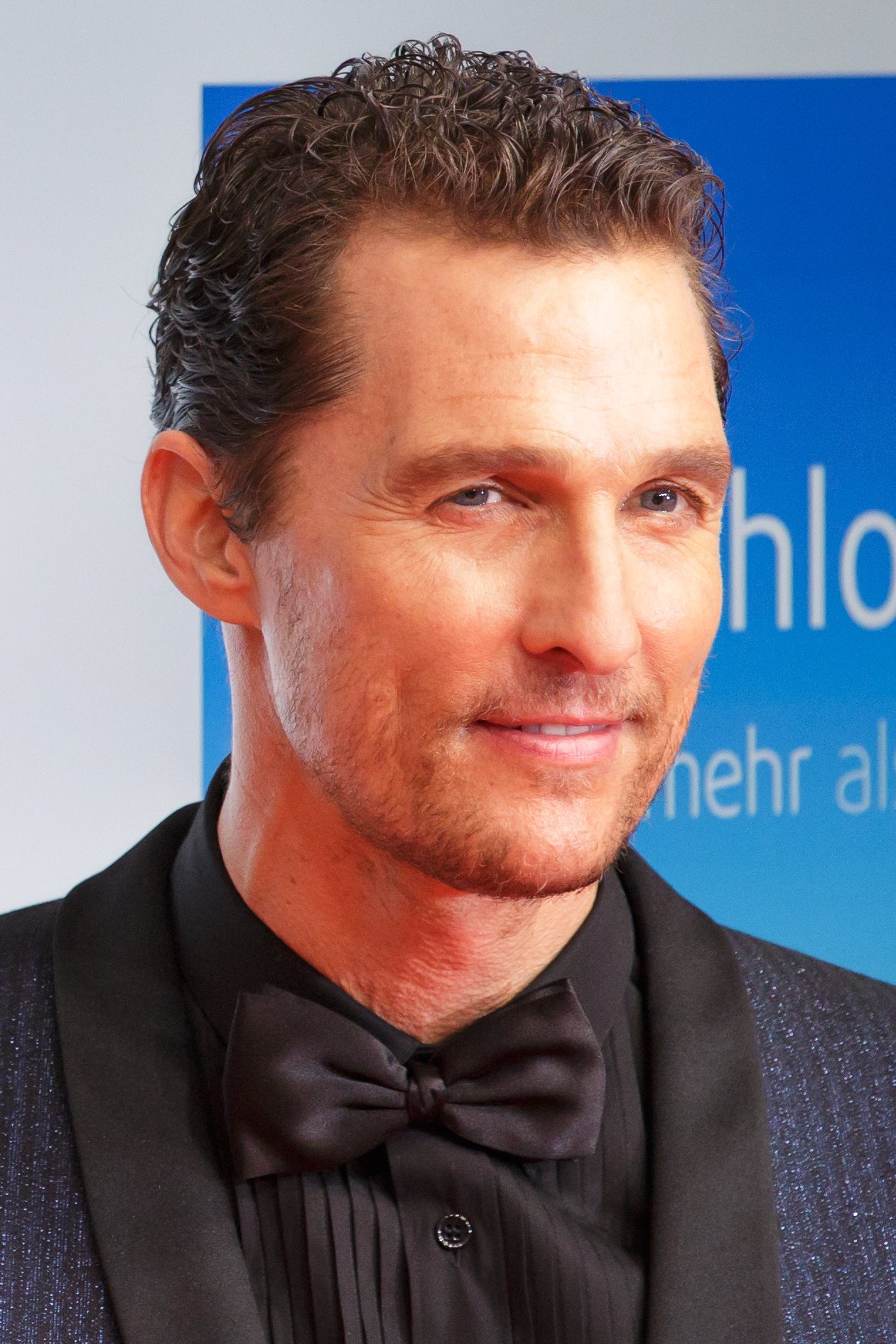
Matthew McConaughey, Outstanding Performance by a Male Actor in a Leading Role winner

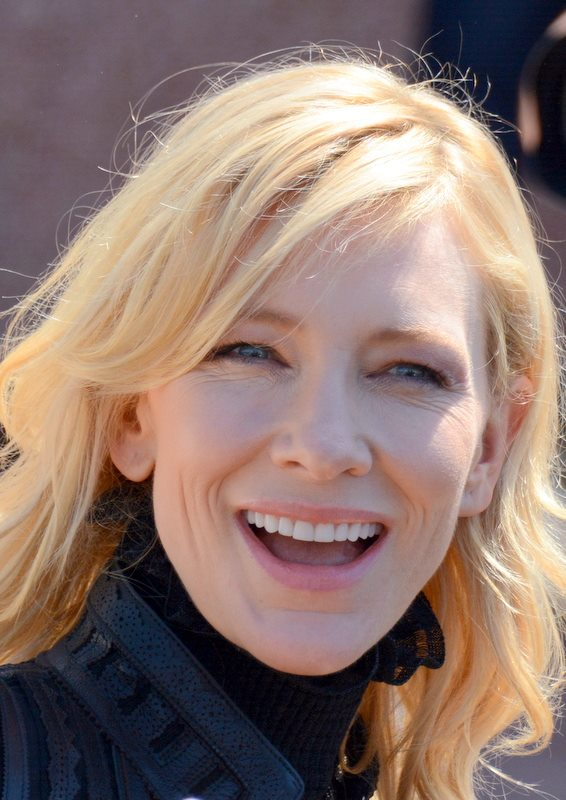
Cate , Outstanding Performance by a Female Actor in a Leading Role winner

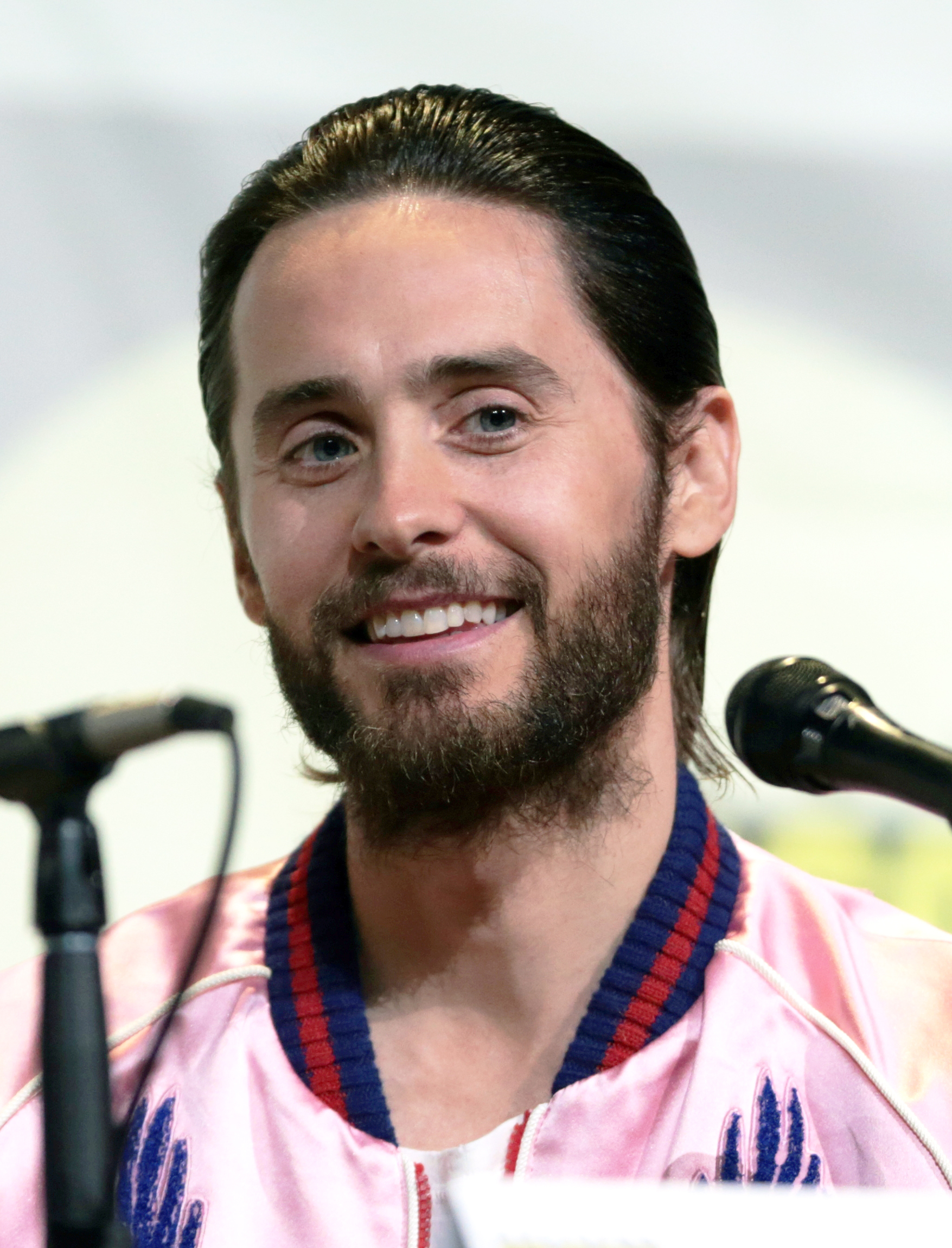
Jared Leto, Outstanding Performance by a Male Actor in a Supporting Role winner

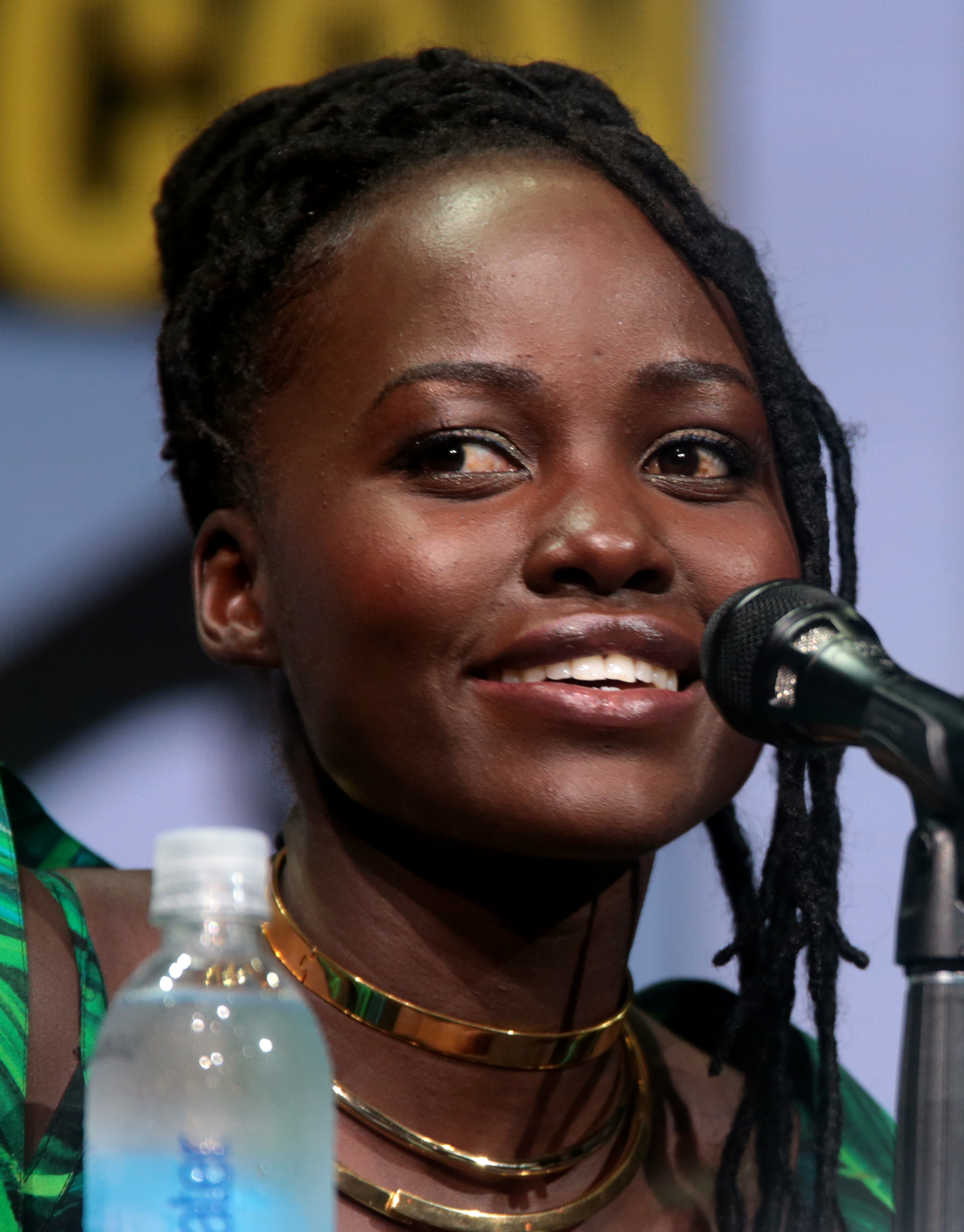
Lupita Nyong'o, Outstanding Performance by a Female Actor in a Supporting Role winner

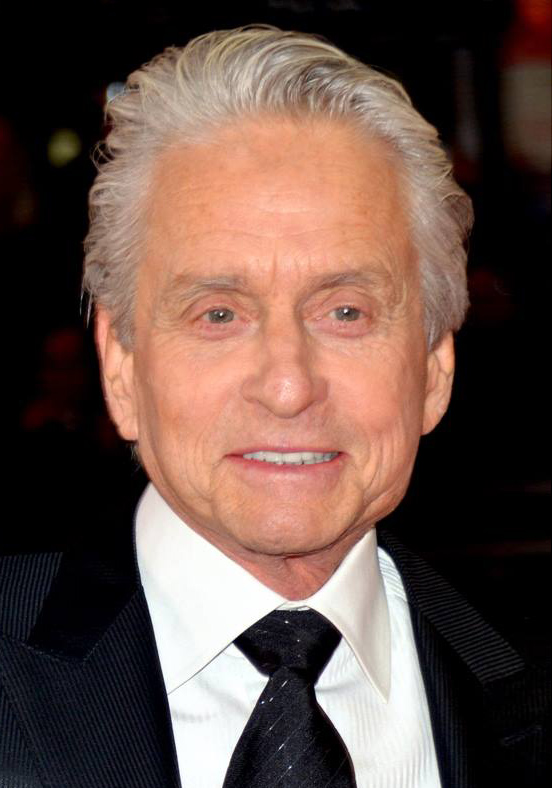
Michael Douglas, Outstanding Performance by a Male Actor in a Miniseries or Television Movie winner

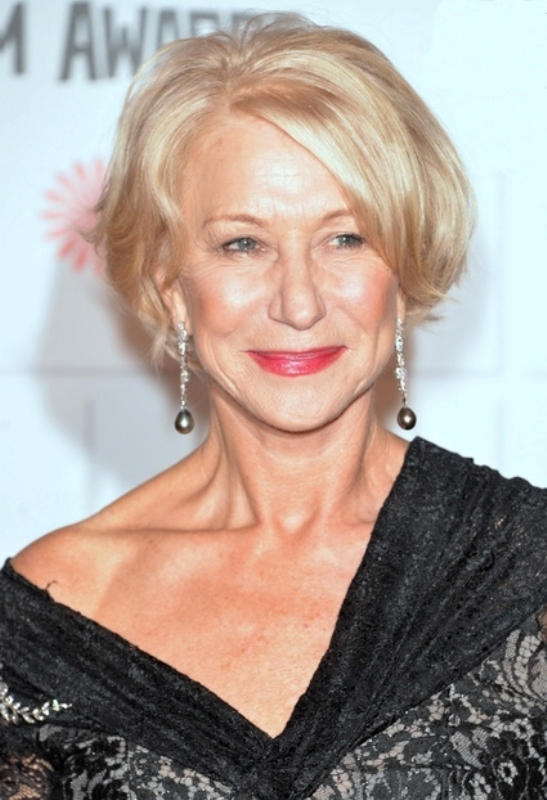
Helen Mirren, Outstanding Performance by a Female Actor in a Miniseries or Television Movie winner

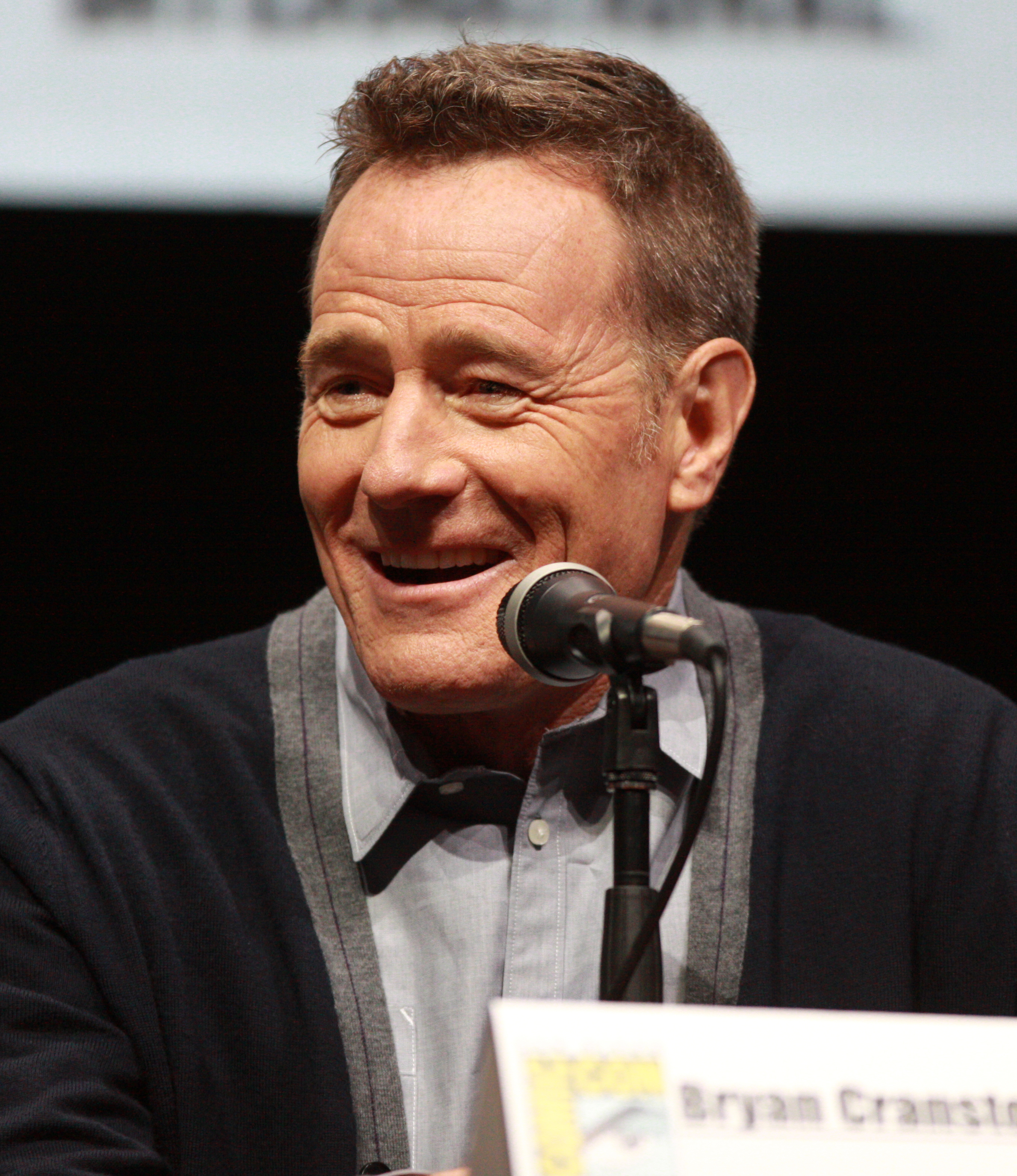
Bryan Cranston, Outstanding Performance by a Male Actor in a Drama Series winner

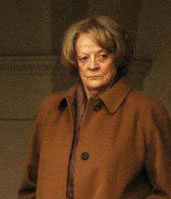
Maggie Smith, Outstanding Performance by a Female Actor in a Drama Series winner

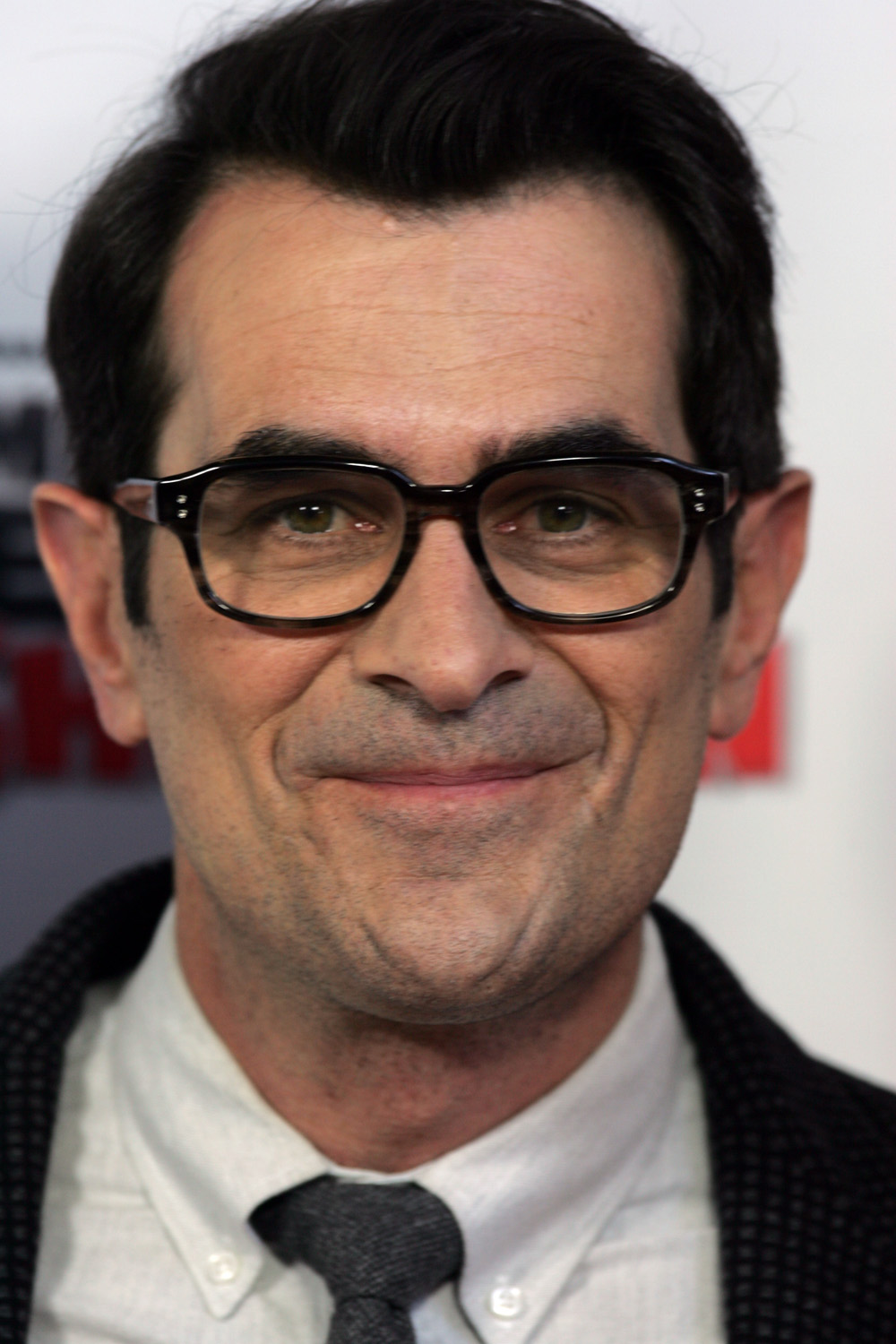
Ty Burrell, Outstanding Performance by a Male Actor in a Comedy Series winner

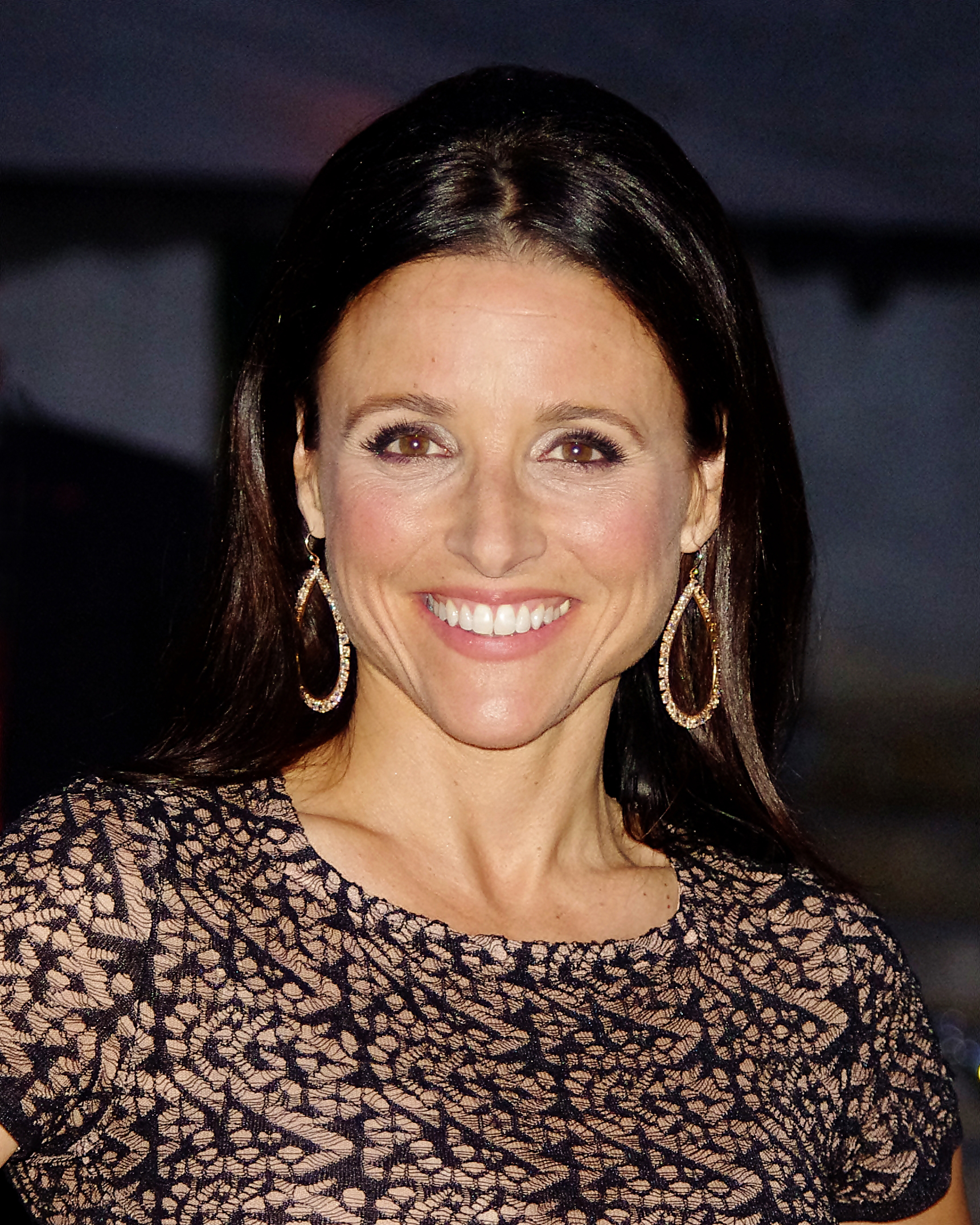
Julia Louis-Dreyfus, Outstanding Performance by a Female Actor in a Comedy Series winner

=== Film ===
| Outstanding Performance by a Male Actor in a Leading Role | Outstanding Performance by a Female Actor in a Leading Role |
|---|---|
| **Matthew McConaughey – Dallas Buyers Club as Ron Woodroof**; Bruce Dern – Nebraska as Woody Grant; Chiwetel Ejiofor – 12 Years a Slave as Solomon Northup; Tom Hanks – Captain Phillips as Richard Phillips; Forest Whitaker – The Butler as Cecil Gaines | **Cate Blanchett – Blue Jasmine as Jeanette "Jasmine" Francis**; Sandra Bullock – Gravity as Dr. Ryan Stone; Judi Dench – Philomena as Philomena Lee; Meryl Streep – August: Osage County as Violet Weston; Emma Thompson – Saving Mr. Banks as P. L. Travers |
| Outstanding Performance by a Male Actor in a Supporting Role | Outstanding Performance by a Female Actor in a Supporting Role |
| **Jared Leto – Dallas Buyers Club as Rayon**; Barkhad Abdi – Captain Phillips as Abduwali Muse; Daniel Brühl – Rush as Niki Lauda; Michael Fassbender – 12 Years a Slave as Edwin Epps; James Gandolfini – Enough Said as Albert (posthumous nomination) | **Lupita Nyong'o – 12 Years a Slave as Patsey**; Jennifer Lawrence – American Hustle as Rosalyn Rosenfeld; Julia Roberts – August: Osage County as Barbara Weston; June Squibb – Nebraska as Kate Grant; Oprah Winfrey – The Butler as Gloria Gaines |
Outstanding Performance by a Cast in a Motion Picture
**American Hustle – Amy Adams, Christian Bale, Louis C.K., Bradley Cooper, Paul Herman, Jack Huston, Jennifer Lawrence, Alessandro Nivola, Michael Peña, Jeremy Renner, Elisabeth Röhm and Shea Whigham**; 12 Years a Slave – Benedict Cumberbatch, Paul Dano, Garret Dillahunt, Chiwetel Ejiofor, Michael Fassbender, Paul Giamatti, Scoot McNairy, Lupita Nyong'o, Adepero Oduye, Sarah Paulson, Brad Pitt, Michael K. Williams and Alfre Woodard; August: Osage County – Abigail Breslin, Chris Cooper, Benedict Cumberbatch, Juliette Lewis, Margo Martindale, Ewan McGregor, Dermot Mulroney, Julianne Nicholson, Julia Roberts, Sam Shepard, Meryl Streep and Misty Upham; Dallas Buyers Club – Jennifer Garner, Jared Leto, Matthew McConaughey, Denis O'Hare, Dallas Roberts and Steve Zahn; The Butler – Mariah Carey, John Cusack, Jane Fonda, Cuba Gooding Jr., Terrence Howard, Lenny Kravitz, James Marsden, David Oyelowo, Alex Pettyfer, Vanessa Redgrave, Alan Rickman, Liev Schreiber, Forest Whitaker, Robin Williams and Oprah Winfrey
Outstanding Performance by a Stunt Ensemble in a Motion Picture
**Lone Survivor**; All Is Lost; Fast & Furious 6; Rush; The Wolverine

=== Television ===
| Outstanding Performance by a Male Actor in a Miniseries or Television Movie | Outstanding Performance by a Female Actor in a Miniseries or Television Movie |
|---|---|
| **Michael Douglas – Behind the Candelabra (HBO) as Liberace**; Matt Damon – Behind the Candelabra (HBO) as Scott Thorson; Jeremy Irons – The Hollow Crown (PBS) as King Henry IV; Rob Lowe – Killing Kennedy (National Geographic) as John F. Kennedy; Al Pacino – Phil Spector (HBO) as Phil Spector | **Helen Mirren – Phil Spector (HBO) as Linda Kenney Baden**; Angela Bassett – Betty & Coretta (Lifetime) as Coretta Scott King; Helena Bonham Carter – Burton & Taylor (BBC America) as Elizabeth Taylor; Holly Hunter – Top of the Lake (Sundance TV) as GJ; Elisabeth Moss – Top of the Lake (Sundance TV) as Det. Robin Griffin |
| Outstanding Performance by a Male Actor in a Drama Series | Outstanding Performance by a Female Actor in a Drama Series |
| **Bryan Cranston – Breaking Bad (AMC) as Walter White**; Steve Buscemi – Boardwalk Empire (HBO) as Nucky Thompson; Jeff Daniels – The Newsroom (HBO) as Will McAvoy; Peter Dinklage – Game of Thrones (HBO) as Tyrion Lannister; Kevin Spacey – House of Cards (Netflix) as Francis Underwood | **Maggie Smith – Downton Abbey (PBS) as Violet, Dowager Countess of Grantham**; Claire Danes – Homeland (Showtime) as Carrie Mathison; Anna Gunn – Breaking Bad (AMC) as Skyler White; Jessica Lange – American Horror Story: Coven (FX) as Fiona Goode; Kerry Washington – Scandal (ABC) as Olivia Pope |
| Outstanding Performance by a Male Actor in a Comedy Series | Outstanding Performance by a Female Actor in a Comedy Series |
| **Ty Burrell – Modern Family (ABC) as Phil Dunphy**; Alec Baldwin – 30 Rock (NBC) as Jack Donaghy; Jason Bateman – Arrested Development (Netflix) as Michael Bluth; Don Cheadle – House of Lies (Showtime) as Marty Kaan; Jim Parsons – The Big Bang Theory (CBS) as Dr. Sheldon Cooper | **Julia Louis-Dreyfus – Veep (HBO) as Selina Meyer**; Mayim Bialik – The Big Bang Theory (CBS) as Dr. Amy Farrah Fowler; Julie Bowen – Modern Family (ABC) as Claire Dunphy; Edie Falco – Nurse Jackie (Showtime) as Jackie Peyton; Tina Fey – 30 Rock (NBC) as Liz Lemon |
Outstanding Performance by an Ensemble in a Drama Series
**Breaking Bad (AMC) – Michael Bowen, Betsy Brandt, Bryan Cranston, Lavell Crawford, Tait Fletcher, Laura Fraser, Anna Gunn, Matthew T. Metzler, RJ Mitte, Dean Norris, Bob Odenkirk, Aaron Paul, Jesse Plemons, Steven Michael Quezada, Kevin Rankin and Patrick Sane**; Boardwalk Empire (HBO) – Patricia Arquette, Margot Bingham, Steve Buscemi, Brian Geraghty, Stephen Graham, Erik LaRay Harvey, Jack Huston, Ron Livingston, Domenick Lombardozzi, Gretchen Mol, Ben Rosenfield, Michael Stuhlbarg, Jacob Ware, Shea Whigham and Jeffrey Wright; Downton Abbey (PBS) – Hugh Bonneville, Laura Carmichael, Jim Carter, Brendan Coyle, Michelle Dockery, Jessica Brown Findlay, Siobhan Finneran, Joanne Froggatt, Rob James-Collier, Allen Leech, Phyllis Logan, Elizabeth McGovern, Sophie McShera, Matt Milne, Lesley Nicol, Amy Nuttall, David Robb, Maggie Smith, Ed Speleers, Dan Stevens, Cara Theobold and Penelope Wilton; Game of Thrones (HBO) – Alfie Allen, John Bradley-West, Oona Chaplin, Gwendoline Christie, Emilia Clarke, Nikolaj Coster-Waldau, Mackenzie Crook, Charles Dance, Joe Dempsie, Peter Dinklage, Natalie Dormer, Nathalie Emmanuel, Michelle Fairley, Jack Gleeson, Iain Glen, Kit Harington, Lena Headey, Isaac Hempstead-Wright, Kristofer Hivju, Paul Kaye, Sibel Kekilli, Rose Leslie, Richard Madden, Rory McCann, Michael McElhatton, Ian McElhinney, Philip McGinley, Hannah Murray, Iwan Rheon, Sophie Turner, Carice van Houten and Maisie Williams; Homeland (Showtime) – F. Murray Abraham, Sarita Choudhury, Claire Danes, Rupert Friend, Tracy Letts, Damian Lewis, Mandy Patinkin and Morgan Saylor
Outstanding Performance by an Ensemble in a Comedy Series
**Modern Family (ABC) – Aubrey Anderson-Emmons, Julie Bowen, Ty Burrell, Jesse Tyler Ferguson, Nolan Gould, Sarah Hyland, Ed O'Neill, Rico Rodriguez, Eric Stonestreet, Sofía Vergara and Ariel Winter**; 30 Rock (NBC) – Scott Adsit, Alec Baldwin, Katrina Bowden, Kevin Brown, Grizz Chapman, Tina Fey, Judah Friedlander, Jane Krakowski, John Lutz, James Marsden, Jack McBrayer, Tracy Morgan and Keith Powell; Arrested Development (Netflix) – Will Arnett, Jason Bateman, John Beard, Michael Cera, David Cross, Portia de Rossi, Isla Fisher, Tony Hale, Ron Howard, Liza Minnelli, Alia Shawkat, Jeffrey Tambor, Jessica Walter and Henry Winkler; The Big Bang Theory (CBS) – Mayim Bialik, Kaley Cuoco, Johnny Galecki, Simon Helberg, Kunal Nayyar, Jim Parsons and Melissa Rauch; Veep (HBO) – Sufe Bradshaw, Anna Chlumsky, Gary Cole, Kevin Dunn, Tony Hale, Julia Louis-Dreyfus, Reid Scott, Timothy Simons and Matt Walsh
Outstanding Performance by a Stunt Ensemble in a Television Series
**Game of Thrones (HBO)**; Boardwalk Empire (HBO); Breaking Bad (AMC); Homeland (Showtime); The Walking Dead (AMC)

=== Screen Actors Guild Life Achievement Award ===
- Rita Moreno

== Multiple nominations ==
=== Film ===
| Nominations | Film |
|---|---|
| 4 | 12 Years a Slave |
| 3 | August: Osage County |
| 3 | The Butler |
| 3 | Dallas Buyers Club |
| 2 | American Hustle |
| 2 | Captain Phillips |
| 2 | Nebraska |
| 2 | Rush |

=== Television ===
| Nominations | Program |
|---|---|
| 4 | Breaking Bad |
| 3 | 30 Rock |
| 3 | The Big Bang Theory |
| 3 | Boardwalk Empire |
| 3 | Game of Thrones |
| 3 | Homeland |
| 3 | Modern Family |
| 2 | Arrested Development |
| 2 | Behind the Candelabra |
| 2 | Downton Abbey |
| 2 | Phil Spector |
| 2 | Top of the Lake |
| 2 | Veep |

== Multiple wins ==
=== Film ===
| Wins | Film |
|---|---|
| 2 | Dallas Buyers Club |

=== Television ===
| Wins | Program |
|---|---|
| 2 | Breaking Bad |
| 2 | Modern Family |

== In Memoriam ==
Tom Hanks introduced a previously recorded "In Memoriam" segment which honored the life and career of the actors who died in 2013:

- Peter O'Toole
- Karen Black
- Paul Walker
- Dennis Farina
- Julie Harris
- Ed Lauter
- Ken Norton
- Tom Laughlin
- Tony Musante
- Deanna Durbin
- Annette Funicello
- Carmen Zapata
- Milo O'Shea
- Allan Arbus
- Eydie Gormé
- Bonnie Franklin
- Steve Forrest
- John Kerr
- Juanita Moore
- Joan Fontaine
- Jeanne Cooper
- Hal Needham
- Michael Ansara
- Richard Griffiths
- Al Ruscio
- Esther Williams
- Joseph Ruskin
- Marcia Wallace
- Ned Wertimer
- Jane Kean
- James Avery
- Dale Robertson
- August Schellenberg
- Eleanor Parker
- Lee Thompson Young
- Jean Stapleton
- Jonathan Winters
- Malachi Throne
- Eileen Brennan
- Cory Monteith
- James Gandolfini

== See also ==
- 3rd AACTA International Awards
- 66th Primetime Emmy Awards
- 67th British Academy Film Awards
- 71st Golden Globe Awards
- 86th Academy Awards
