= Meet Bill =

- Theatrical release poster
- Directed by: Bernie Goldmann; Melisa Wallack
- Written by: Melisa Wallack
- Produced by: Fisher Stevens; John Penotti; Matthew Rowland
- Starring: Aaron Eckhart; Jessica Alba; Elizabeth Banks; Timothy Olyphant; Logan Lerman
- Cinematography: Peter Lyons Collister
- Edited by: Greg Hayden; Nick Moore
- Music by: Edward Shearmur
- Distributed by: First Look International
- Release dates: September 8, 2007 (Toronto International Film Festival); April 4, 2008 (United States)
- Running time: 97 minutes
- Country: United States
- Language: English
- Budget: $5 million
- Box office: $346,592

Meet Bill (formerly known as Bill) is a 2007 American independent comedy film written and directed by Bernie Goldmann and Melisa Wallack, and stars Aaron Eckhart as the title character, with supporting performances by Logan Lerman, Jessica Alba, Elizabeth Banks and Timothy Olyphant.

== Synopsis ==
A guy fed up with his job and married to a cheating wife reluctantly mentors a rebellious teen.

== Plot ==
Bill Anderson is a dissatisfied middle-aged man, working at his father-in-law's bank, where no one takes him seriously. Out of shape and struggling with body image issues, he stashes and consumes candy in his home and office. His father-in-law, Mr. Jacoby, is a pillar in the community and considering a mayoral run. Bill and his wife Jess (Jacoby's daughter) live in a house provided by her father and are financially comfortable. Bill is in the process of purchasing a doughnut franchise through the Whitmans to wean himself and his wife off of Jacoby's finances.

At the family's public donation ceremony, Bill meets "the Kid", a teen he protects from the school principal for possession of marijuana. In the bathroom, the principal suggests that Bill join a school mentoring program, to which he agrees.

Bill becomes suspicious when he sees Jess talking with newscaster Chip Johnson at the ceremony. He plants a hidden camera in their bedroom as he goes on a hunting trip with his father-in-law and brother-in-law, accompanied by their mentored students. The video from the hidden camera confirms that Jess is having an affair with Chip; in a rage, Bill bursts onto Chip's live broadcast, beats him up, and is arrested.

Bill is bailed out by his successful older brother Sargeant, and then stays at his place with Sargeant's husband Paul. Bill and Jess, after fighting about the sex tape, go to Chip's. When Chip behaves rudely to Jess, Bill beats him up again on live TV and demands an apology, so Bill is labeled Chip's "deranged fan." Random people frequently yell "Apologize!" at Bill throughout the film in a reference to this incident.

Taking up swimming again helps Bill clear his mind, and he continues mentoring the Kid, who admires him. A plan is devised to win back Bill's wife. Lingerie salesgirl Lucy, at the Kid's insistence, flirts with Bill in front of Jess to make her jealous, and she also accompanies Bill and the Kid to an in-person visit to one of the doughnut franchise locations, posing as Jess.

Bill continues to work on getting his life back, cutting out sweets, losing weight, swimming daily, mentoring the Kid, and trying to win back Jess. At a family dinner, he volunteers to buy fireworks for the picnic where Jacoby will announce his mayoral bid. After a fun-filled day, Bill, the Kid, Lucy, and her friend go back to his tent in his brother's back yard, where he gets high and has sex with Lucy's friend.

At the golf course picnic, Bill gets too close to his wife and Chip (who had a restraining order filed against him), so security throws him out. Bill plans to meet the Kid at the back, but while driving there, crashes into a tree, causing the fireworks to explode early.

The Kid rescues Bill on a golf cart, taking him to the hospital. Jess shows up, as she found out about the franchise. Discussing their marriage, Bill reveals his unhappiness and dislike of their dependence on her father's money.

Bill takes further steps to reclaim his life, cutting his own hair and changing his wardrobe. He later visits Jacoby at the bank to resign, pointing out that he doesn't fit in. His father-in-law understands, accepting his resignation, commending Bill for attacking Chip, saying he would have done the same (revealing he knew about her affair, despite Jess trying to hide it).

When Bill meets with the Whitmans at the franchise headquarters he is surprised to see Jess, who has convinced them to let them buy the franchise. During a private conversation, Bill confesses he was going to call it off, as he's had a change of heart. He lets the purchase go through, then gives it to her. They make peace, agreeing to separate and putting the house up for sale.

At the Kid's school, Bill bids him farewell, excited to start a new, unknown chapter in his life. He promises to keep in touch, telling him to look in his locker which explodes with fireworks, to his delight.

== Cast ==
- Aaron Eckhart as Bill Anderson
- Jessica Alba as Lucy
- Elizabeth Banks as Jess
- Logan Lerman as The Kid
- Holmes Osborne as Mr. Jacoby
- Todd Louiso as John Jr.
- Timothy Olyphant as Chip Johnson
- Craig Bierko as Sargeant Anderson (uncredited)
- Reed Diamond as Paul
- Kristen Wiig as Jane Whitman
- Jason Sudeikis as Jim Whitman
- Andy Zou as Donald Choo
- Ana Mackenzie as Sarah Sheldon (credited as Ana Lucasey)
- Gabriel Basso as Kid with Cancer

== Production ==
The film was shot in St. Louis, Missouri from June 11 – July 20, 2006; the school scenes of the film were shot at Mary Institute and St. Louis Country Day School (MICDS) and additional scenes were filmed at Washington University in St. Louis. Scenes were also shot at: the Oberweis Dairy in Oakville, Missouri, in Dick's Sporting Goods store at West County Mall, in Des Peres, Missouri, at the Saint Louis Galleria in Richmond Heights, Missouri, and an exterior scene at Molly Brown's Fireworks in Pacific, Missouri. KPLR-TV, a St. Louis television station, is the station that Chip Johnson works for, and movie co-anchor Rick Edlund was an anchor on the station in real life. Filming for several scenes took place at St. Albans Country Club in St. Albans, Missouri. Additionally, some scenes were shot at Bellerive Country Club in Town and Country, Missouri. Although shot in the St. Louis area, the setting of the movie is Minnesota, as indicated by the license plates of vehicles, and a "Twin Cities Realty" for-sale sign.

Re-shoots and additional scenes were shot in Los Angeles, California, after major production had finished.

Lindsay Lohan was originally cast in the role of Lucy before being replaced by Alba.

== Release ==
The film officially premiered on September 8, 2007, at the Toronto International Film Festival and was immediately picked up for distribution. It was released in limited engagement on April 4, 2008, in St. Louis and Minneapolis, with a wider release in 36 theaters on May 9, 2008.

== Reception ==
On Rotten Tomatoes, the film has an approval rating of 20% based on reviews from 20 critics, with an average rating of 3.84/10. On Metacritic it has a score of 30% based on reviews from 8 critics, indicating "generally unfavorable reviews".

Michael Rechtshaffen of The Hollywood Reporter wrote: "After a promising start, this quirky comedy falls flat despite Eckhart's best efforts." Eddie Cockrell of Variety called it "A labored screwball comedy about disenchanted people of privilege yearning for fulfillment, pic is full of leaden hijinx directed and played with all the subtlety of a myocardial infarction."
