= Melisa Wallack =

American screenwriter

- Born: 1968 (age 57–58); Wayzata, Minnesota, U.S.
- Education: Skidmore College
- Occupations: Screenwriter; film director
- Spouse: Bernie Goldmann

Melisa Wallack (born 1968) is an American screenwriter and film director. Wallack and fellow screenwriter Craig Borten were nominated for an Academy Award for Best Original Screenplay for the 2013 film Dallas Buyers Club.

== Life and career ==
Wallack was born in Wayzata, Minnesota, a small town outside Minneapolis. She is one of six children. She attended The Breck School and Skidmore College, earning a Bachelor of Arts in English and a Bachelor of Science in business.

After college, she returned to Minneapolis, in 1993 where she joined her sister Andrea Wallack in establishing a national presence for NightOwl Discovery, a company specializing in data discovery, governance and compliance for heavily regulated industries. When the company expanded to the West Coast in 1995, Wallack moved to Los Angeles and, after "meeting a lot of writers", decided to become a screenwriter herself. She partnered with Craig Borten to write the screenplay for Dallas Buyers Club, which was based on the true story of AIDS activist Ron Woodruff. Although Wallack and Borten sold the script in the 1990s, the film did not enter production for several years and was released in 2013, almost 20 years after it had been written. Dallas Buyers Club received numerous accolades, including an Academy Award nomination for Best Original Screenplay for Wallack and Borten.

After selling the script for Dallas Buyers Club, Wallack was named one of Variety magazine's "10 screenwriters to watch" in 2005. Her first feature film to be produced was Meet Bill, which Wallack wrote and directed with her husband, Bernie Goldmann, and which was released in 2007. She created the story for the 2012 film Mirror Mirror, an adaptation of the Snow White fairy tale starring Julia Roberts.

Wallack's future projects include the screenplay of Emily the Strange and a rewrite of The Last Witch Hunter.

In 2021, an article by AIDS activist Peter Staley described Wallack as an AIDS denialist and detailed the experience of attempting to remove more than 30 inaccurate claims about AIDS from her original script for Dallas Buyers Club.

== Writing credits ==
Film

Year	Title	Notes
2007	Meet Bill	Also co-directed with Bernie Goldmann
2012	Mirror Mirror	Story only
2013	Dallas Buyers Club	Nominated- Academy Award for Best Original Screenplay
2020	Raymond	Short film

Television

Year	Title	Notes
2014	Believe	Episode "Prodigy"
2016	Invisible	5 episodes (Also executive producer)
