= Robin Mathews (make-up artist) =

American make-up artist

- Occupation: make-up artist
- Years active: 1999-Present

Robin Mathews is a make-up artist.

She won “Best Period and/or Character Makeup - Feature Films” for her work in Dallas Buyers Club, as part of the 2014 Make-Up Artists and Hair Stylists Guild Awards.

She also, along with hairstylist Adruitha Lee, won an Academy Award for Best Makeup and Hairstyling for Dallas Buyers Club.
