= Rachel Winter =

American film producer

- Occupation: Film Producer

Rachel Winter is a film producer. Winter and her fellow producers were nominated for an Academy Award for Best Picture for the 2013 film Dallas Buyers Club. In 2015, she co-founded RainMaker Films with producers Clay Pecorin, Russell Geyser, Chris Robert, and Corey DeSalvo.

== Filmography ==
- Wayward Son (1999)
- Long Lost Son (2006)
- Brooklyn Rules (2007)
- Dallas Buyers Club (2013)
- Stealing Cars (2015)
- Krystal (2017)
- The Space Between (2021) (director/producer)
