= Martin Pensa =

Film editor

Martin Pensa is a film editor. Pensa and fellow film editor Jean-Marc Vallée (as John Mac McMurphy) were nominated for the Academy Award for Best Film Editing for the 2013 film Dallas Buyers Club.
