= Dallas Buyers Club =

2013 American film by Jean-Marc Vallée

- Theatrical release poster
- Directed by: Jean-Marc Vallée
- Written by: Craig Borten; Melisa Wallack
- Produced by: Robbie Brenner; Rachel Winter
- Starring: Matthew McConaughey; Jennifer Garner; Jared Leto
- Cinematography: Yves Bélanger
- Edited by: John Mac McMurphy; Martin Pensa
- Production companies: Truth Entertainment; Voltage Pictures
- Distributed by: Focus Features
- Release dates: September 7, 2013 (TIFF); November 22, 2013 (United States)
- Running time: 117 minutes
- Country: United States
- Language: English
- Budget: $5 million
- Box office: $55 million

Dallas Buyers Club is a 2013 American biographical drama film written by Craig Borten and Melisa Wallack, and directed by Jean-Marc Vallée. The film tells the story of Ron Woodroof (Matthew McConaughey), a cowboy diagnosed with AIDS in the mid-1980s, a time when both the etiology and the treatment of HIV/AIDS were poorly understood and its sufferers subject to stigma. As part of an ongoing experimental AIDS treatment movement, Woodroof smuggles unapproved pharmaceutical drugs into Texas to treat his symptoms. Here, he distributes them to fellow people with AIDS by establishing the "Dallas Buyers Club", all the while facing opposition from the Food and Drug Administration (FDA).

Two fictional supporting characters, Dr. Eve Saks (Jennifer Garner), and Rayon (Jared Leto), were composite roles created from interviews with transgender AIDS patients, activists, and doctors. Presidential biographer and PEN-USA winner Bill Minutaglio wrote the first magazine profile of the Dallas Buyers Club in 1992. The article, which featured interviews with Woodroof and also recreated his dramatic international exploits, attracted widespread attention from filmmakers and journalists.

Screenwriter Borten interviewed Woodroof in 1992 and wrote the script, which he polished with writer Wallack in 2000, and then sold to producer Robbie Brenner. Several other actors, directors, and producers were attached at various times to the development of the film, but left the project. Universal Pictures also tried to make the film, but did not. A couple of screenwriters wrote drafts that were rejected. In 2009, producer Brenner involved Matthew McConaughey because of his Texan origins, the same as Woodroof's. Brenner selected the first draft, written by Borten and Wallack, for the film and then Vallée was set to direct. Principal photography began in November 2012 in New Orleans, continuing for 25 days of filming, which also included shooting in Baton Rouge. Brenner and Rachel Winter co-produced the film. The official soundtrack album featured various artists, and was released digitally on October 29, 2013, by the Relativity Music Group.

Dallas Buyers Club premiered at the 2013 Toronto International Film Festival and was released theatrically in the United States on November 1, 2013, by Focus Features, entering wide release on November 22. The film grossed $55 million worldwide against a $5 million budget and received widespread critical acclaim, resulting in numerous accolades. Critics praised the performances of McConaughey and Leto, who respectively received the Academy Award for Best Actor and the Academy Award for Best Supporting Actor at the 86th Academy Awards, making this the first film since Mystic River (2003), and only the fifth film ever to win both awards. The film won the award for Best Makeup and Hairstyling and garnered nominations for Best Picture, Best Original Screenplay, and Best Editing.

== Plot ==
In 1985, promiscuous Dallas electrician and rodeo cowboy Ron Woodroof is diagnosed with HIV/AIDS and told that he has about 30 days to live. At first, he refuses to accept the diagnosis until he remembers having unprotected sex with a prostitute who was an IV drug user. Woodroof's family and friends ostracize him, mistakenly assuming he contracted AIDS from gay sex. He is fired from his job and evicted from his home. His doctor, Eve Saks, tells him an antiretroviral drug called AZT—the only drug yet approved for testing in human clinical trials by the FDA—is thought to prolong the life of AIDS patients. Saks informs him that half of the trial patients receive the drug and the other half receive a placebo, since this is the only way to determine whether the drug works.

Woodroof bribes a hospital worker to get him AZT, which, exacerbated by his cocaine and alcohol abuse, causes his health to deteriorate. Recuperating in the hospital, he meets Rayon, a drug-addicted, HIV-positive trans woman, whom he is initially hostile toward. As his health worsens, he drives to a makeshift Mexican hospital to get more AZT. The facility is run by an American, Dr. Vass, whose medical license was revoked because his work with people with AIDS had violated US regulations. Vass warns Woodroof against AZT, calling it "poisonous." Instead, he prescribes a cocktail of drugs and nutritional supplements centered on ddC and the protein peptide T, which are not yet approved for use in the USA by the FDA. Three months later, Woodroof finds his health much improved and realizes he could make money by importing the drugs and selling them to other HIV-positive patients. He is able to get the drugs over the border by masquerading as a priest with cancer and claiming they are for personal use. Dr. Saks starts to notice the adverse effects of AZT, but her supervisor, Dr. Sevard, tells her the trials cannot be discontinued.

Woodroof starts selling the drugs in Dallas on the street, at gay nightclubs, and discotheque bars. He reluctantly partners with Rayon since she can bring in more customers. The pair establishes the Dallas Buyers Club, charging $400 per month for membership and giving away the drugs to members to circumvent the laws that made it illegal to sell the drugs. The club is extremely popular, and Woodroof gradually begins to respect Rayon as a friend. When Woodroof is hospitalized for a heart attack caused by an overdose of recently acquired interferon from Japan, Dr. Sevard learns of the club and its alternative drugs and is angry that the buyers' club is interfering with his trial. The FDA confiscates the interferon and threatens to have Woodroof arrested. Dr. Saks agrees that there are benefits to clubs for HIV drugs, but feels powerless to change anything. The process the FDA uses to research, test, and approve drugs is considered flawed and part of the problem for people suffering from AIDS. At that time, the USA and the FDA were particularly conservative by international standards in testing and approving anti-AIDS drugs. They were hostile to imported drugs to the point that they were made contraband. Dr. Saks and Woodroof begin a friendship.

The FDA gets a warrant to raid the Buyers Club, but can do nothing but fine Woodroof. The FDA changes its regulations in 1987, making any unapproved drug illegal. With the club strapped for cash, Rayon begs her father for money and tells Woodroof that she has sold her life insurance policy to raise money. Woodroof travels to Mexico to get more peptide T. Upon his return, he finds that Rayon has died in the hospital and is extremely upset by her death. Dr. Saks is asked to resign when the hospital discovers she has been sending patients to the buyers club, but she refuses, insisting they will have to fire her instead.

After Rayon's death, Woodroof begins to show more compassion toward LGBT members of the club, and making money becomes less of a concern; his priority becomes providing the drugs as peptide T gets increasingly challenging to acquire. Woodroof files a lawsuit against the FDA in late 1987, seeking the legal right to take the protein, which has been confirmed as nontoxic but is still not FDA-approved. The judge is sympathetic toward him and admonishes the FDA, but lacks the power to do anything. The FDA later allows Woodroof to take peptide T for personal use. He dies of AIDS in 1992, seven years later than his doctors had initially predicted.

== Cast ==
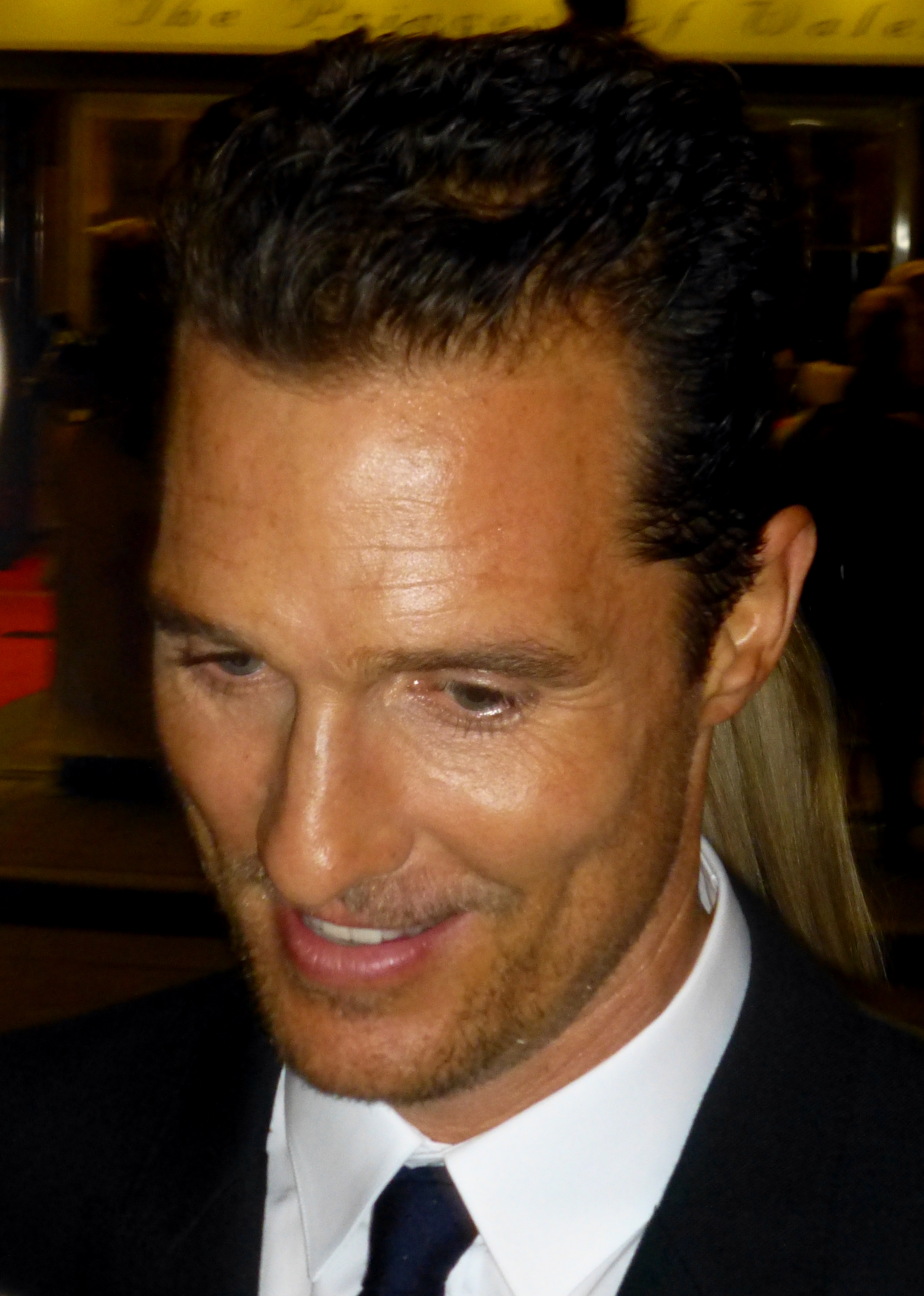
McConaughey at the 2013 Toronto International Film Festival premiere

- Matthew McConaughey as Ron Woodroof, a real-life person with AIDS who smuggled unapproved pharmaceutical drugs into Texas when he found them effective at improving his symptoms. In an interview with CBS News' Lee Cowan in February 2014, McConaughey said that he selected the role because he thought it was not just a normal story, but it was a story of a "wild man". McConaughey was raised near Dallas, so he was very familiar with the culture. Additionally, he thought that the script was "incredibly human, with no sentimentality". McConaughey lost nearly 50 pounds (23 kg) of body weight to play Woodroof in the film.
- Jennifer Garner as Dr. Eve Saks, who treats people with AIDS, like Woodroof and Rayon. Upon Garner's casting, after reading the script she expressed: "I had heard about it, and I had seen pictures of Matthew losing weight. And really couldn't imagine how I was going to do it, and was so happy at home."
- Jared Leto as Rayon, a fictional trans woman with AIDS who helps Woodroof. To accurately portray his role, Leto lost 30 pounds (13 kilograms), shaved his eyebrows, and waxed his entire body. He stated the portrayal was grounded in his meeting transgender people while researching the role. He stated that when he moved to Los Angeles in 1991, he had a roommate who died of AIDS. He "[worked] on Rayon's voice for weeks" and refused to break character during filming; director Vallée stated, "I don't know Leto. Jared never showed me Jared."
- Denis O'Hare as Dr. Sevard
- Steve Zahn as Tucker, a Dallas Police Officer, Ron's friend
- Michael O'Neill as Richard Barkley, an FDA agent and antagonist
- Dallas Roberts as David Wayne, Ron's lawyer
- Griffin Dunne as Dr. Vass, a Mexico-based doctor
- Kevin Rankin as T. J., Ron's friend
- Bradford Cox as "Sunflower", Rayon's lover, a cross-dresser dying of AIDS
- Scott Takeda as Mr. Yamata
- Joji Yoshida as Dr. Hiroshi
- Adam Dunn (cameo) as a bartender

== Production ==
=== Development ===
The film is based on the real life of Ron Woodroof, a patient of HIV and AIDS, who was the subject of a lengthy 1992 article in The Dallas Morning News written by journalist and author Bill Minutaglio. A month before Woodroof died in September 1992, screenwriter Craig Borten was told about the story by his friend, so he went and interviewed him to create the screenplay; Borten recorded many hours of interviews with Woodroof and had access to his personal journals. Borten wrote a script for what he believed would make a great movie and attempted to attract interest in making the film in mid 1996, with Dennis Hopper attached to direct. Columbia Pictures was set to buy the script but the film was unable to secure financial backing.

In an interview, Borten revealed that he met Melisa Wallack in 2000 and asked her to help with the script, to which she said yes. In 2001, after one year of working on the script, they sold it to producer Robbie Brenner, who then set Marc Forster to direct the film for Universal Pictures, but left due to some personal delays. In June 2008, Craig Gillespie and Ryan Gosling were in talks to join the film, which was to be produced by David Bushell and Marc Abraham for Universal Pictures and Strike Entertainment. Chase Palmer was writing the script that time around, and screenwriters Guillermo Arriaga and Stephen Belber had reportedly also written the subsequent drafts for the film.

In 2009, producer Robbie Brenner got involved again and rejected all the rewrites of the script, and the original version by Borten and Wallack was sent to actor Matthew McConaughey to see if the Texas native would be interested in playing the role. On March 9, 2011, Jean-Marc Vallée was confirmed to direct the film based on the script by Borten and Wallack. Rachel Winter also attached to produce the film.

On November 14, 2012, it was announced that Remstar Films had acquired the Canadian rights while Entertainment One would handle the United Kingdom rights for the film. On April 23, 2013, Focus Features acquired the United States and Latin American distribution rights for the theatrical release of the film. In May 2013, Voltage Pictures and Truth Entertainment closed a deal to produce the film.

=== Casting ===
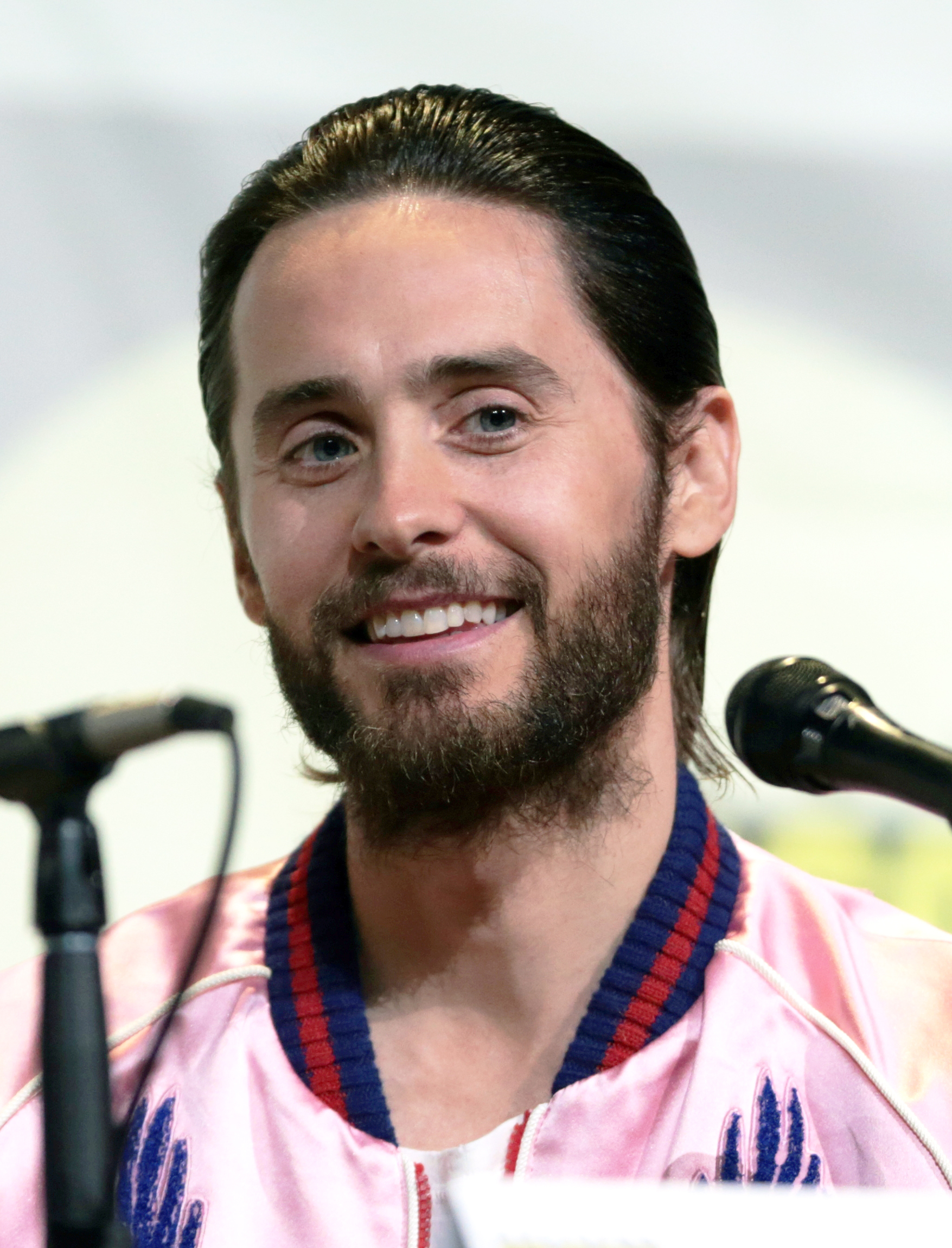
Jared Leto portrays Rayon, a transgender woman in the film

In 1996, Woody Harrelson was attached to the film to play Ron Woodroof, but left the film because of financing issues. In 2002, Brad Pitt was attached to play the lead role. In June 2008, Ryan Gosling was in talks to join the film for the lead role to play Woodroof, but couldn't take the role. In 2009, producer Brenner sent the script to actor Matthew McConaughey and got him involved to star in the film. Wondering whether the Uvalde, Texas native was interested in playing another Texas native, Brenner says that he asked himself: "'Who is Ron Woodroof?' And in my mind, it was Matthew. Like Ron, he's from Dallas, he's handsome, and he has a twinkle in the eye. Matthew also has intensity and intelligence like Ron did, mixed with that cowboy charisma and fighter's spirit. He was beyond perfect for the role." Writer Borten said: "Ron was a very charismatic, funny and persuasive, a real salesman. Even if he was making fun of you, you wanted him to continue because he was so charming. Matthew possesses a lot of those same qualities." On March 9, 2011, Los Angeles Times confirmed that McConaughey would star in the film as Woodroof and quoted McConaughey as saying: "It's a great script and a great story. And I think it can be a great movie."

On May 11, 2011, Hilary Swank was reportedly in talks to join the film with McConaughey's role confirmed. On October 3, 2012, it was announced that Swank had dropped out of the film and that Gael García Bernal was in talks to play an HIV patient who meets Woodroof in the hospital and helps him in the club. On November 6, The Hollywood Reporter confirmed that Jared Leto would be returning to acting to play the role which Bernal was previously in talks to play. In January 2014, Jared Leto admitted that he was sent a script 15 years ago but never read it. When Leto was asked about his role, he said: "This was a really special movie. I think it was the role of a lifetime. It's one of the best things I've ever done." He also said that he tried to stay focused on the role because he knew it was an incredible opportunity. On November 14, Dallas Roberts and Steve Zahn joined the film; Roberts would play David Wayne, Ron's defense attorney, while Zahn would play a Dallas police officer who is sympathetic to Ron. On November 26, Griffin Dunne, Denis O'Hare, and Bradford Cox joined the cast when the shooting was underway in New Orleans.

McConaughey lost 47 pounds (21 kg) for the role, going from 183 pounds (83 kg) to 136 pounds (62 kg). Leto lost over 30 pounds (14 kg) for the role and said that he had stopped eating to lose weight quicker; his lowest record weight was 114 pounds (52 kg).

=== Filming ===
Principal photography began on November 11, 2012, in New Orleans. Filming also took place in Baton Rouge. Jennifer Garner has stated that the film was shot very quickly over just 25 days and has remarked that McConaughey "gave an even wilder performance in takes that didn't appear onscreen". McConaughey stated that "I was riding a new way of making a film. There were no lights, one camera, 15-minute takes." Half of the shots were lit with artificial light and the other half were not. Vallée said: "I now had a perfect opportunity to try to shoot an entire movie without artificial lights, using the Alexa digital camera. Like the RED, the Alexa offers a broad spectrum of colors and shadows in even the darkest natural lighting conditions. I felt that the approach was right for this project. The look and feel became that we were capturing reality; even though Dallas Buyers Club is not a documentary in content or structure, it could have that subtle quality. We shot the movie 100% handheld with two lenses, a 35-millimeter and a 50-millimeter. These get close to the actors and don't skew the images. (Director of Photography) Yves Belanger adjusted for every shot at 400 or 1600 ASA (light sensitivity), displaying different color balance."

Jared Leto, who played Rayon, an AIDS patient and trans woman with a drug problem, refused to break character for the whole 25 days of shooting. Interviews of cast and crew who were involved in the film revealed that, in a sense, they never really met Leto until months after the shoot was over. Leto said about his character, "That phrase staying in character to me really means commitment, focus, and for a role like this that's so intense and challenging and extreme in a lot of ways, it demanded my full attention."

=== Music ===
The film does not feature an original score, but several original and incorporated songs, released as a separate album. The album Dallas Buyers Club (Music from and Inspired by the Motion Picture) was released on October 30, 2013, by the Relativity Music Group. The soundtrack album featured various artists, include Leto's band Thirty Seconds to Mars, Tegan and Sara, Awolnation, The Naked and Famous, T. Rex, My Morning Jacket, Fitz and the Tantrums, Blondfire, Neon Trees, Cold War Kids, Capital Cities, The Airborne Toxic Event, and more. It was announced that 40 cents of every sale of album at iTunes would go to the AIDS relief charity Project Red's Global Fund.

== Release ==
The first trailer was launched on August 27, 2013. The film premiered at the 2013 Toronto International Film Festival on September 7, on which Deadline Hollywood's Pete Hammond said, "It would seem an absolute no-brainer that both (McConaughey and Leto) will be sitting front and center come March 2nd at the Dolby Theatre when Oscar winners are announced. If there are two better performances by anyone this year I have not seen them." Focus Features released the film on November 1, 2013.

=== Home media ===
Dallas Buyers Club was released on DVD and Blu-ray on February 4, 2014. In the United States, the film has grossed $4,532,240 from DVD sales and $3,097,179 from Blu-ray sales, making a total of $7,629,419.

== Reception ==
=== Box office ===
The film's release was previously set for December 5, but hoping to gain a competitive edge amid a crowded playing field, Focus Features shifted the release date to November 1, believing the new date was ideal to launch a platform release in the awards season, and expecting to do a wide release for 5-day Thanksgiving weekend (November 27 – December 1). Because the film was an awards contender, Focus set the date in November for an Oscars strategy like that for 2013 Oscar winner Argo, which was released in October 2012.

Over its opening weekend from November 1–3 of limited release in Los Angeles, New York, Toronto and Montreal, the film grossed $260,865 from 9 theaters with an average of $28,985 per theater, In second weekend from November 8–10, film grossed $638,704, making total of $993,088 with an average amount of $18,249 from 35 theaters. And it was expanded to 184 locations in its third week of release and it grossed $1,751,359 from Nov 15–17, with an average of $9,518, making total of $3,012,295. It opened wide on November 22 (the weekend before Thanksgiving) in 666 theaters and grossed $2,687,157 from November 22–24, with a total of $6,374,058 and average of $4,035 per location. The wide release coincided with the Screen Actors Guild Awards ballots deadline, and was before the Golden Globe Awards ballots. The Screen Actors Guild mailed Screen Actors Guild Award nomination ballots to its voters on November 20, and the nomination ballots for the Golden Globe Awards were mailed to the Hollywood Foreign Press Association members on or before November 27.

71st Golden Globe Awards were announced on January 12, 2014, with Dallas Buyers Club winning both of its nominations, and the film earned six 86th Academy Awards nominations that were announced on January 16. The twelfth weekend after limited release, the film's theater run jumped from 125 screens to a total of 419 and the film grossed $17,813,220 with an average of $2,246 per theater from January 17–19. After the 20th Screen Actors Guild Awards were announced on January 18 with Dallas Buyers Club winning two of its three nominations, during the thirteenth weekend from January 24–26, 2014, the film expanded to 1,110 locations (highest playing of the film) and grossed $2,028,570 more in that weekend with an average of $1,828. Until that weekend the top grossing markets were Los Angeles, New York, San Francisco, Chicago and Dallas.

After a total of 182 days, the film ended its American theatrical run on May 1, 2014, with a gross of $27,298,285 in North America. It grossed $27,900,000 in foreign countries including $8,755,794 of the United Kingdom, $2,761,258 of Australia, making a worldwide total gross of $55,198,285.

=== Critical response ===
Upon its premiere at the 2013 Toronto International Film Festival, Dallas Buyers Club received universal acclaim by critics and audiences, who praised the film for its acting (particularly for McConaughey and Leto), screenplay and direction. On the review aggregator website Rotten Tomatoes, 92% of 266 critics' reviews are positive, with an average rating of 7.8/10. The website's consensus reads: "Dallas Buyers Club rests squarely on Matthew McConaughey's scrawny shoulders, and he carries the burden gracefully with what might be a career-best performance." Metacritic, which uses a weighted average, assigned the film a score of 77 out of 100, based on 47 critics, indicating "generally favorable" reviews.

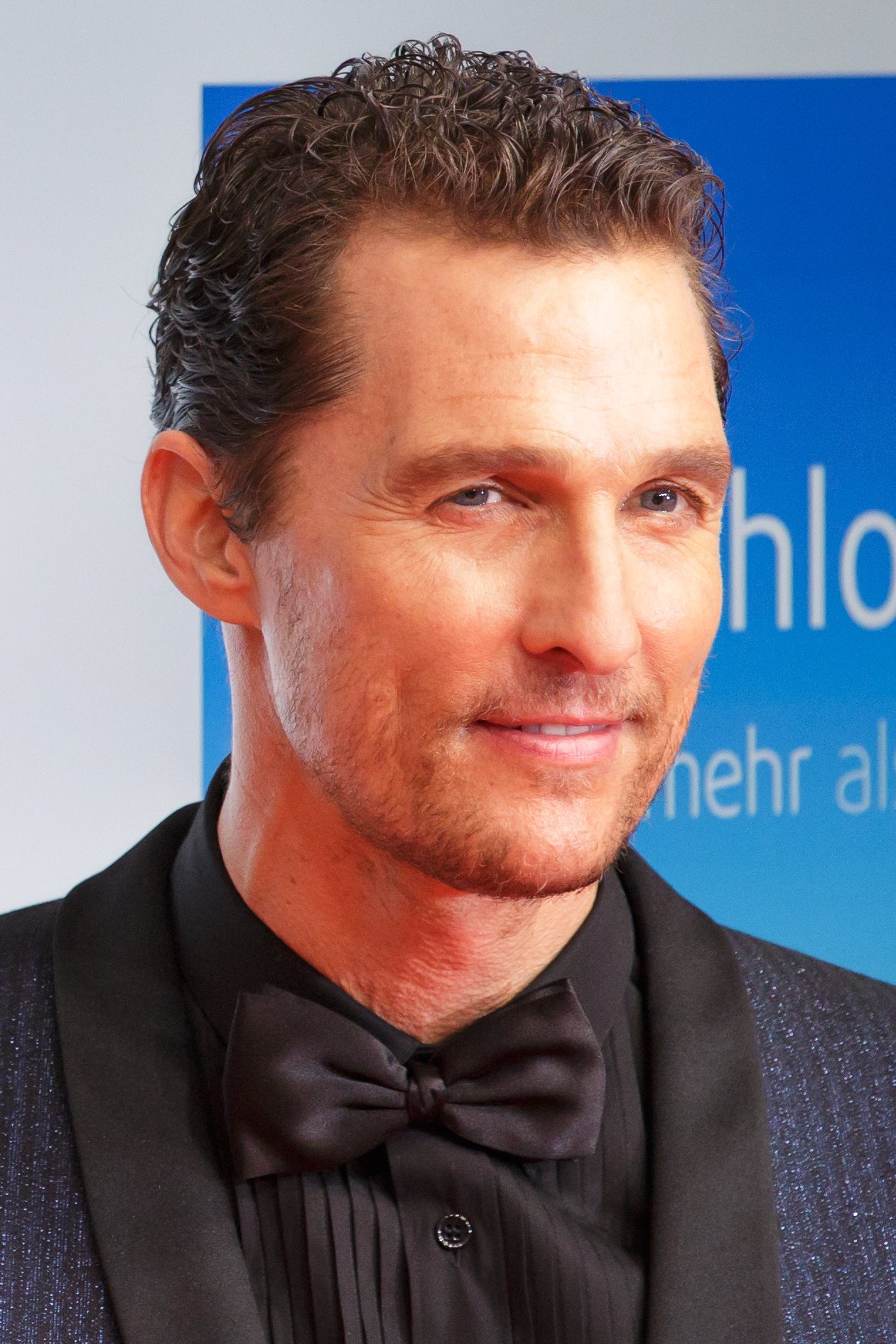
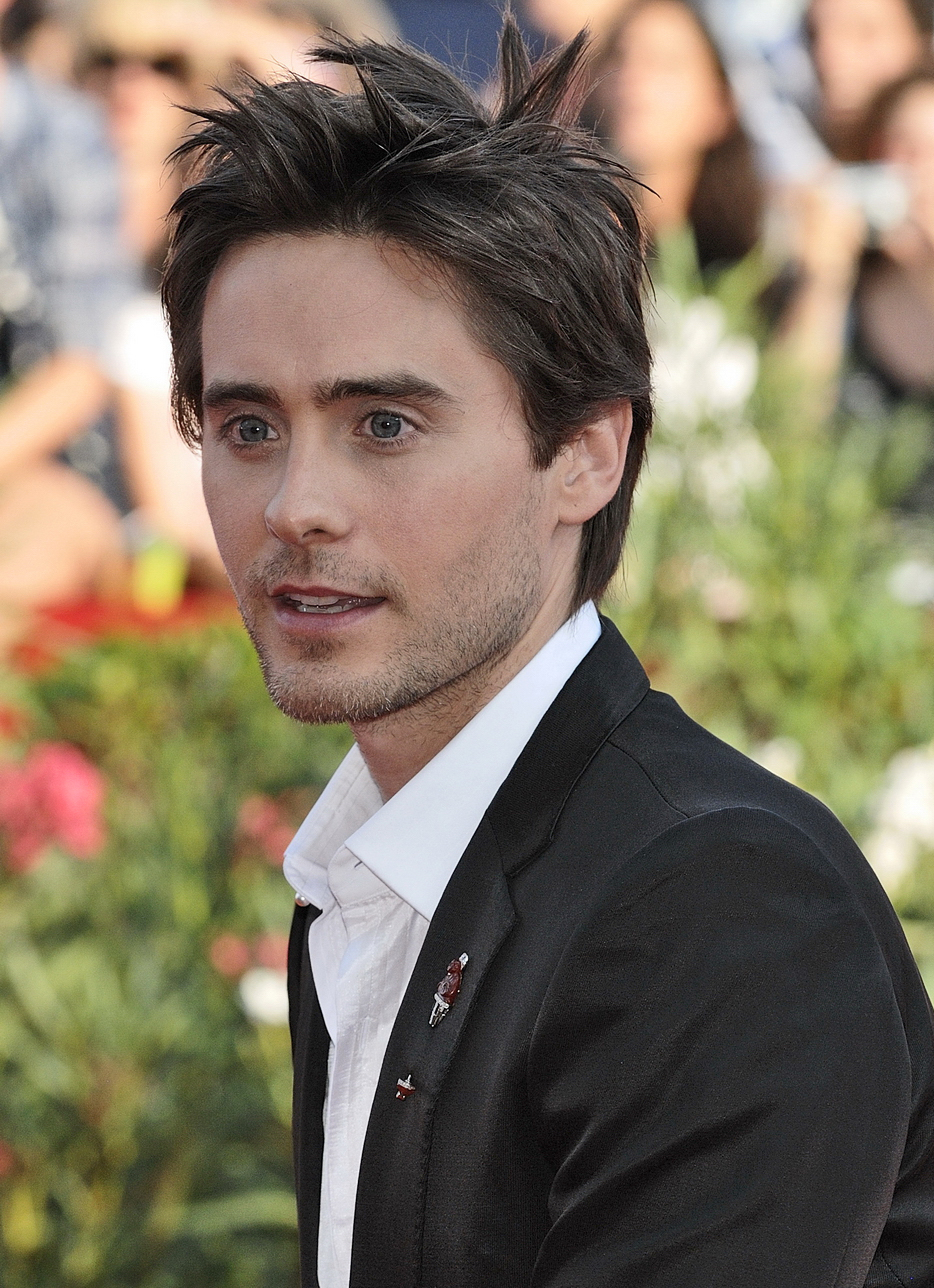
The performances of Matthew McConaughey and Jared Leto garnered critical acclaim, earning them Academy Award nominations for Best Actor and Best Supporting Actor respectively, with both winning their respective categories.

Richard Corliss of Time considered McConaughey's portrayal to be a "bold, drastic and utterly persuasive inhabiting of a doomed fighter", remarking that "if the camera occasionally suffers a fashionable case of the jitters, the movie transcends its agitated verismo to impart dramatic and behavioral truth". Chris Bumbray reviewed the film for JoBlo.com and gave it 9 out of 10, and said, "Like Woodroof, the film never wants your pity, and while tears will no doubt be shed while watching it, they're well-earned." The Philadelphia Inquirer's Steven Rea talked about McConaughey's role, "Just about everything is right with Dallas Buyers Club, beginning with Matthew McConaughey's literally transformative portrayal. McConaughey's performance isn't just about the weight loss. It's about gaining compassion, even wisdom, and it's awesome."

Mick LaSalle of the San Francisco Chronicle said, "Dallas Buyers Club" takes audiences back to the worst of the AIDS crisis, where the disease was a death sentence, and the public's terror and hostility were at its height." Film critic Richard Roeper reviewed the film for his own website, and talked about McConaughey: "Once we get past McConaughey's stunning transformation, we're transfixed by a performance that reminds us of why this guy became a movie star in the first place." Ann Hornaday gave the film 4 out of 4 ratings for The Washington Post, writing, "McConaughey delivers the performance of his career, characterized not just by an astonishing physical transformation but by a wellspring of deep compassion and fearlessness."

The Orange County Register's film critic Michael Sragow gave the film grade "A" and commented on three lead characters, "A trio of terrific performers imbues a riveting AIDS drama with heart and mind as well as pertinence." Film critic Ty Burr of The Boston Globe wrote, "The movie's often touching and very watchable, but what gets you past the script's sincere calculation is the growing sense of rage toward a medical–industrial complex that saw AIDS sufferers as guinea pigs and sources of profit."

The Chicago Tribune's film critic Michael Phillips wrote, "How Woodroof became his own brand of AIDS activist is the stuff of Dallas Buyers Club, which does a few things wrong but a lot right, starting right at the top with McConaughey." Bob Mondello criticized the film's main character for NPR in these words: "Dallas Buyers Club is just about a selfish boor who arguably gets a pass in terms of posterity, because while looking out for No. 1, he paved the way for change for everyone else." Dana Stevens of Slate praised McConaughey's performance, highlighting that the movie "traffics in deep hindbrain emotions: fear and rage and lust and, above all, the pure animal drive to go on living."

A. O. Scott reviewed the film for The New York Times and said, "Matthew McConaughey brings a jolt of unpredictable energy to Dallas Buyers Club, an affecting if conventional real-life story of medical activism."

The Wall Street Journal's film critic wrote, "Matthew McConaughey continues to amaze." David Denby of The New Yorker talked about McConaughey's physical transformation in his words, "It's McConaughey's spiritual transformation that is most remarkable. His gaze is at once desperate and challenging." Rolling Stone's Peter Travers said, "[Matthew McConaughey's] explosive, unerring portrayal defines what makes an actor great, blazing commitment to a character and the range to make every nuance felt." Film critic Rex Reed reviewed the film for The New York Observer and wrote, "Dallas Buyers Club represents the best of what independent film on a limited budget can achieve-powerful, enlightening and not to be missed." TheWrap's Alonso Duralde wrote, "McConaughey is the only reason to see Dallas Buyers Club, but he's enough of a reason to see Dallas Buyers Club."

Film critic Betsy Sharkey reviewed for the Los Angeles Times, "[McConaughey and Leto] elevate the movie beyond ordinary biography or overplayed tragedy, and give Oscar-worthy performances in the process." Sharkey was especially complimentary to Leto, writing, "Leto's performance, though, is the revelation. ... It's a hauntingly authentic performance; the tailored suit he puts on to meet with his disapproving father is one of the film's most moving scenes." Peter Debruge of Variety said, "Matthew McConaughey and Jared Leto give terrific performances in this riveting and surprisingly relatable true story."

Leto's portrayal of Rayon, a drug-addicted trans woman with AIDS who befriends McConaughey's character Ron Woodroof, received critical acclaim. The writers created Rayon, to show "Woodroof's gradual acceptance of a subculture he had dismissed." Time's Richard Corliss noted, "Leto captures the sweet intensity and almost saintly good humor of a glamorous, poignant and downright divoon creature — a blithe Camille who may surrender her health but never her panache." Leto was awarded an Academy Award, Golden Globe, a Screen Actors Guild Award, and a variety of film critics' circle awards.

After the 86th Academy Awards ceremony, the casting of a non-transgender actor was critiqued as a missed opportunity, with some LGBTQ activists criticizing the choice as transmisogynistic. A guest blogger published on the Los Angeles Times website compared the issue to white actors appropriating, and exploiting, the roles of East Asians and Africans in the past; and guest contributors noted in The Guardian and The Independent that transgender actors are often relegated to roles such as prostitutes, corpses and "freaks".

=== Accolades ===
Dallas Buyers Club received six nominations at the 86th Academy Awards: Best Picture, Best Actor for McConaughey, Best Supporting Actor for Leto, Best Original Screenplay, Best Film Editing for Martin Pensa and Vallée (Vallée being credited under the pseudonym "John Mac McMurphy"), and Best Makeup and Hairstyling for Adruitha Lee and Robin Mathews. McConaughey and Leto won Academy Awards for Best Actor and Best Supporting Actor, respectively – the first film since Mystic River 10 years earlier to receive both awards and only the sixth overall to do so. Lee and Mathews won the Best Makeup and Hairstyling, although Mathews had a budget of only $250.

The film received two Screen Actors Guild Awards, for Best Actor (McConaughey) and Best Supporting Actor (Leto); it was also nominated for Best Cast. At the 71st Golden Globe Awards McConaughey and Leto again won Best Actor – Motion Picture – Drama and Best Supporting Actor – Motion Picture respectively. The film was also nominated for Best Original Screenplay at the Writers Guild of America Awards, while Leto's performance won a range of awards from critics groups, including the New York Film Critics Circle and the Los Angeles Film Critics Association. The National Board of Review named Dallas Buyers Club one of the top ten independent films of 2013.

== Historical accuracy ==
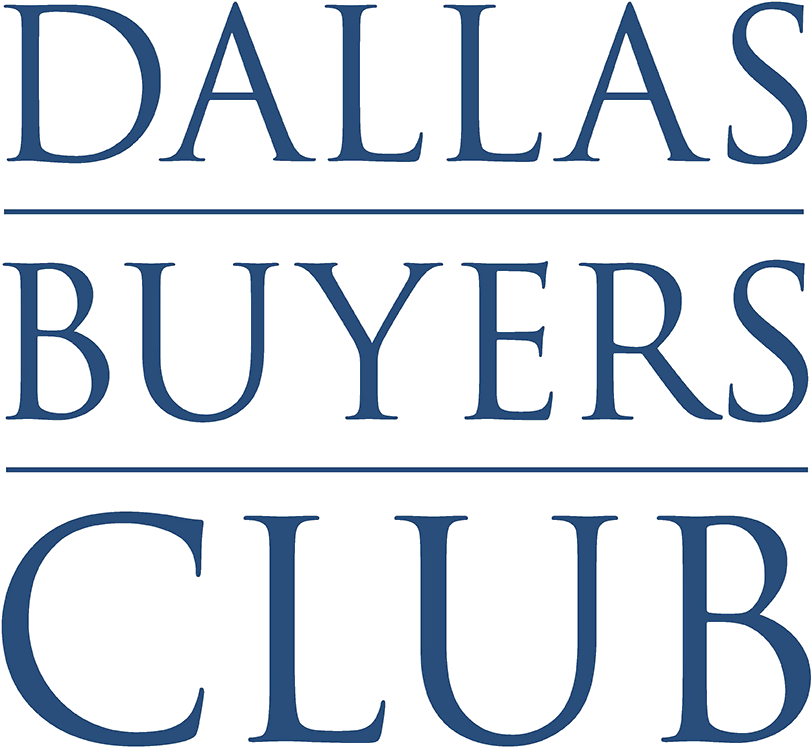
Logo of the Dallas Buyers Club

The characters of Rayon and Dr. Eve Saks were fictional; the writers had interviewed transgender AIDS patients, activists, and doctors for the film and combined these stories to create the two composite supporting roles. However, Woodroof did lose all his friends after they found out he was HIV-positive. In his interviews with Borten, Woodroof implied that this, along with interactions with gay people living with AIDS through the buyers club, led to a rethinking of his apparent anti-gay sentiments and changed his views on gay people. Other people who knew him said that he did not harbor anti-gay sentiments; the real Woodroof was openly bisexual and assumed he had contracted HIV from sexual encounters with men. Also, while a rodeo enthusiast, he never rode any bulls himself. Although the film shows Woodroof diagnosed in 1985, he told Borten that a doctor had informed him he might have had the disease well before that; Woodroof believed that he may have been infected in 1981, something that was briefly alluded to in a flashback in the film.

While Woodroof was known for outlandish behavior, according to those who knew him, both the film and McConaughey made him rougher than he actually was; The Dallas Morning News has reported that Woodroof was "outrageous, but not confrontational" and that people who knew him felt that his portrayal as "rampantly homophobic" early in the film was inaccurate. The real Woodroof also had a sister and a daughter who were not approached by the writers and were left out of the script to make the film more of a character study.

The visual blog Information is Beautiful deduced that, while taking creative license into account, the film was 61.4% accurate when compared to real-life events, summarizing that the film seemed "like an authentically true-story with liberties taken".

=== Drug treatments ===
The film implies that the drug and vitamin regimen promoted by Woodroof was safer and more effective than the drugs being issued in hospitals and tested by the FDA at the time, but this has been criticized by numerous observers. Daniel D'Addario, in an article in Salon, suggests that "the film's take is perilously close to endorsing pseudoscience."

Woodroof frequently declares that the drug AZT (azidothymidine) is ineffective and counter-productive, yet years later it is still prescribed to patients with AIDS, albeit at a much lower dose (as mentioned in the epilogue). Medical historian Jonathan Engel, who wrote The Epidemic: A History of AIDS, states that AZT was in fact a relatively effective treatment for the period, consistently prolonging lives for a year at a time when AIDS had a 100% mortality rate. Journalist David France, who directed the documentary How to Survive a Plague, suggested that AZT was actually "the first element of a cocktail of drugs that ended the era of AIDS-as-death sentence". Initial attempts to use high doses of AZT proved to be no more effective than smaller doses, but HIV/AIDS activist Peter Staley (who was consulted by the filmmakers) believes this was not the result of any conspiracy – initially medical researchers had to guess what dose would be effective and they feared a low dose would be ineffective. Eventually, researchers realized that AZT was ineffective in the long term because the HIV virus mutated and became resistant to the treatment. By the mid-1990s, David Ho and other researchers found AZT was quite effective when used in conjunction with two other anti-virals, which decreased the chances of virus developing resistance to any one drug.

The treatments that Woodroof did promote were less-effective at best, or at worst, dangerous. According to Staley, Woodroof became a proponent of Peptide T, a treatment which "never panned out. It's a useless therapy, and it never got approved, and nobody uses it today, but the film implies that it helped him." DDC, also promoted by Woodroof, did prove to be an effective antiviral treatment, but it also proved to have worse side effects than AZT, with the potential to cause irreversible nerve damage in some cases. As a result, it was only used by doctors for a relatively short time. A third treatment promoted by Woodroof, called Compound Q (Trichosanthin), was specifically linked to two deaths during trials, and therefore, was not used by doctors thereafter. Most "buyers clubs" stopped providing it as well, but Woodroof continued to dispense it, part of the reason for Woodroof's conflict with the FDA.
