= Ron Woodroof =

American entrepreneur (1950–1992)

- Woodroof in 1991
- Born: Ronald Dickson Woodroof; February 3, 1950; Dallas, Texas, U.S.
- Died: September 12, 1992 (aged 42); Dallas, Texas, U.S.
- Spouses: Mary Etta Pybus (m. 1969; div. 1972) Rory S. Flynn (m. 1972; div. 1973) Brenda Shari Robin (m. 1982; div. 1986)
- Children: 1

Ronald Dickson Woodroof (February 3, 1950 – September 12, 1992) was an American man who created what would become known as the Dallas Buyers Club in March 1988, one of several such AIDS buyers clubs that sprang up at the time. After learning he had contracted the human immunodeficiency virus (HIV) in 1985 and being diagnosed with AIDS, he created the group as part of his efforts to find and distribute drugs to treat AIDS at a time when the disease was poorly understood.

He sued the United States Food and Drug Administration (FDA) over a ban on peptide T, a drug he was using. Woodroof's final years became the basis of the 2013 film Dallas Buyers Club, in which he was portrayed by Matthew McConaughey.

== Biography ==
Woodroof was born in Dallas, Texas, on February 3, 1950, to Garland Odell Woodroof (March 17, 1917, in Texas – December 3, 1983, in Dallas) and Willie Mae Hughes (November 25, 1917, in Oklahoma – November 19, 1996, in Dallas).

His first marriage was to Mary Etta Pybus on June 28, 1969, in Dallas; they had a daughter. They divorced on March 23, 1972. On May 6, 1972, he married a woman named Rory S. Flynn in Dallas. They divorced on May 21, 1973. He then married Brenda Shari Robin on October 4, 1982, in Lubbock. They divorced on March 4, 1986, after he was diagnosed with HIV.

It was recorded that Woodroof had a mercurial personality. One reporter writes that "Woodroof took guns to his doctor’s office, prompting Steven Pounders to 'fire him as a patient.'" Woodroof later sent the doctor roses, and the doctor took him back. Woodroof was said to have lost all his friends after they found out he was HIV-positive. The movie Dallas Buyers Club depicts Woodroof as holding homophobic views prior to contracting HIV. Other people who knew Woodroof said that he did not harbor anti-gay beliefs and was openly bisexual. He was a member of the Dallas Gay Alliance.

== Dallas Buyers Club ==
After suffering from the side effects of AZT, Ron Woodroof began looking for other drugs he could use to further prolong his life. He acquired nutritional supplements and drugs not approved by the FDA for use in the United States, which he found helpful in ameliorating his symptoms. Woodroof established what he called the Dallas Buyers Club in 1988 as a front for distributing these drugs and other substances to AIDS patients.

== Death ==
Despite initially being given only 30 days to live when learning about his HIV status, Woodroof lived seven more years following his diagnosis before dying on September 12, 1992, from pneumonia brought on by AIDS. He is buried in Restland Memorial Park.

== Portrayal in the media ==
Woodroof’s life was the basis of the 2013 film Dallas Buyers Club. He was portrayed in the film by Matthew McConaughey, who won an Academy Award for Best Actor for his performance as Woodroof.
