= List of accolades received by American Hustle =

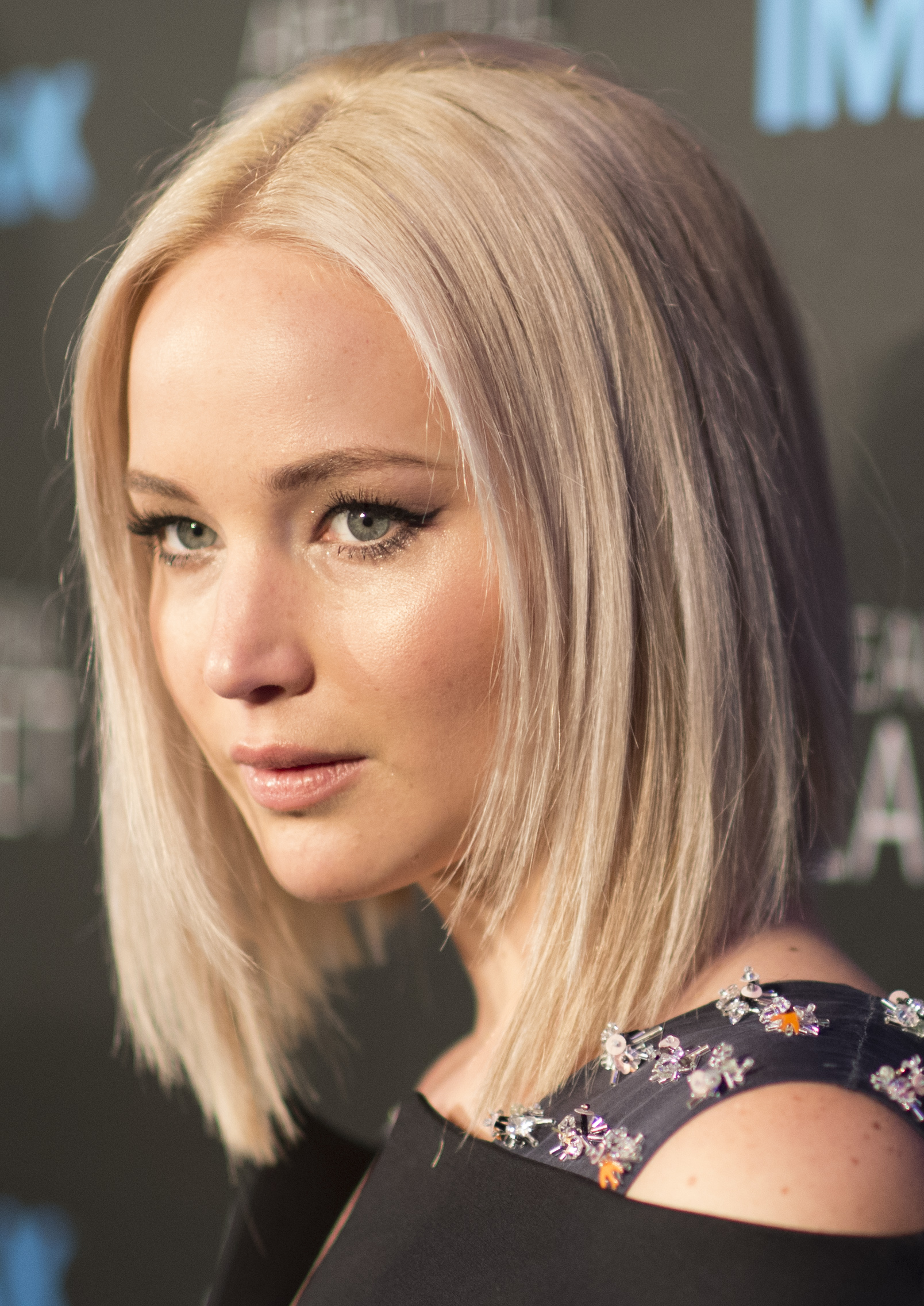
- Jennifer Lawrence received numerous nominations for her performance in American Hustle.
Accolades
Award	Won	Nominated
AACTA Awards	2	7
AARP Annual Movies for Grownups Awards	1	1
Academy Awards	0	10
Alliance of Women Film Journalists	1	7
American Cinema Editors	1	1
American Film Institute	1	1
Art Directors Guild	0	1
British Academy Film Awards	3	10
Broadcast Film Critics Association	4	13
Casting Society of America	0	1
Chicago Film Critics Association	0	5
Costume Designers Guild	0	1
Dallas–Fort Worth Film Critics Association	0	3
Detroit Film Critics Society	1	5
Directors Guild of America Award	0	1
Dorian Awards	0	1
Empire Awards	0	2
Florida Film Critics Circle	0	4
Golden Globe Awards	3	7
Hollywood Film Awards	2	2
Houston Film Critics Society	0	3
Irish Film & Television Academy	0	1
Location Managers Guild of America	0	2
London Film Critics' Circle	0	3
Motion Picture Sound Editors	0	2
MTV Movie & TV Awards	0	8
National Society of Film Critics	1	1
New York Film Critics Circle	3	4
New York Film Critics Online	1	1
Online Film Critics Society	0	4
Palm Springs International Film Festival	1	1
Producers Guild of America	0	1
San Diego Film Critics Society	1	2
San Francisco Film Critics Circle	2	6
Satellite Awards	2	8
Screen Actors Guild Awards	1	2
Society of Camera Operators	0	1
St. Louis Film Critics Association	0	7
Teen Choice Awards	0	3
Toronto Film Critics Association	1	1
Vancouver Film Critics Circle	1	2
Washington D.C. Area Film Critics Association	0	4
Writers Guild of America Awards	0	1
- Total number of awards and nominations
Totals	33	151
- References

American Hustle is a 2013 American crime comedy-drama film directed by David O. Russell. The screenplay, written by Eric Warren Singer and Russell, is based on the FBI ABSCAM operation of the late 1970s and early 1980s. It was filmed in Boston, Worcester, and New York City. It stars an ensemble cast of Christian Bale, Amy Adams, Bradley Cooper, Jeremy Renner and Jennifer Lawrence.

Columbia Pictures initially provided a limited release to American Hustle at six theaters on December 13, 2013. It was later given a wide release at over 2,500 theaters in the United States and Canada on December 20. The film grossed a worldwide total of over $251 million on a budget of $40 million. As of 2019, it is also Russell's highest-grossing film to date. Rotten Tomatoes, a review aggregator, surveyed 280 reviews and judged 93% to be positive.

At the 86th Academy Awards, American Hustle joint-led the nominations with Gravity, both earning ten nominations each. It was also the fifteenth film in Oscar history to be nominated in all four acting categories. However, the film did not win any awards at the ceremony. At the 71st Golden Globe Awards, the film garnered seven nominations, going on to win Best Motion Picture – Musical or Comedy, Best Actress – Musical or Comedy for Adams, and Best Supporting Actress for Lawrence. American Hustle was nominated for ten British Academy Film Awards and went on to win Best Actress in a Supporting Role for Lawrence, Best Original Screenplay, and Best Makeup and Hair. At the 20th Screen Actors Guild Awards, the film won Outstanding Performance by a Cast in a Motion Picture. It was also nominated at the Directors Guild Awards, Producers Guild Awards, and Writers Guild Awards. The American Film Institute included the film in their list of Top Ten Films of 2013.

== Accolades ==
Award	Date of ceremony	Category	Recipient(s)	Result	Ref(s)
AACTA International Awards	January 10, 2014	Best Film	Charles Roven, Richard Suckle, and Megan Ellison	Nominated	
AACTA International Awards	January 10, 2014	Best Direction	David O. Russell	Nominated	
AACTA International Awards	January 10, 2014	Best Screenplay	Eric Warren Singer and David O. Russell	Won	
AACTA International Awards	January 10, 2014	Best Actor	Christian Bale	Nominated	
AACTA International Awards	January 10, 2014	Best Actress	Amy Adams	Nominated	
AACTA International Awards	January 10, 2014	Best Supporting Actor	Bradley Cooper	Nominated	
AACTA International Awards	January 10, 2014	Best Supporting Actress	Jennifer Lawrence	Won	
Academy Awards	March 2, 2014	Best Picture	Charles Roven, Richard Suckle, Megan Ellison and Jonathan Gordon	Nominated	
Academy Awards	March 2, 2014	Best Director	David O. Russell	Nominated	
Academy Awards	March 2, 2014	Best Actor	Christian Bale	Nominated	
Academy Awards	March 2, 2014	Best Actress	Amy Adams	Nominated	
Academy Awards	March 2, 2014	Best Supporting Actor	Bradley Cooper	Nominated	
Academy Awards	March 2, 2014	Best Supporting Actress	Jennifer Lawrence	Nominated	
Academy Awards	March 2, 2014	Best Original Screenplay	Eric Warren Singer and David O. Russell	Nominated	
Academy Awards	March 2, 2014	Best Costume Design	Michael Wilkinson	Nominated	
Academy Awards	March 2, 2014	Best Film Editing	Jay Cassidy, Crispin Struthers and Alan Baumgarten	Nominated	
Academy Awards	March 2, 2014	Best Production Design	Production Design: Judy Becker; Set Decoration: Heather Loeffler	Nominated	
Alliance of Women Film Journalists	December 16, 2013	Best Film	American Hustle	Nominated	
Alliance of Women Film Journalists	December 16, 2013	Best Director (Female or Male)	David O. Russell	Nominated	
Alliance of Women Film Journalists	December 16, 2013	Best Actress in a Supporting Role	Jennifer Lawrence	Nominated	
Alliance of Women Film Journalists	December 16, 2013	Best Original Screenplay	Eric Warren Singer and David O. Russell	Nominated	
Alliance of Women Film Journalists	December 16, 2013	Best Ensemble Cast	American Hustle	Won	
Alliance of Women Film Journalists	December 16, 2013	Best Editing	Alan Baumgarten, Jay Cassidy, and Crispin Struthers	Nominated	
Alliance of Women Film Journalists	December 16, 2013	AWJF Female Icon Award	Jennifer Lawrence "for American Hustle and The Hunger Games: Catching Fire, and for handling her high degree of celebrity extremely well"	Nominated	
AARP Annual Movies for Grownups Awards	January 6, 2014	Best Time Capsule	American Hustle	Won	
American Cinema Editors	February 7, 2014	Best Edited Feature Film – Comedy/Musical	Jay Cassidy, Crispin Struthers, and Alan Baumgarten	Won	
American Film Institute	January 10, 2014	Top Ten Films of the Year	Megan Ellison, Charles Roven, and Richard Suckle	Won	
Art Directors Guild	February 8, 2014	Excellence in Production Design for a Period Film	Judy Becker	Nominated	
BAFTA Awards	February 16, 2014	Best Film	Charles Roven, Richard Suckle, Megan Ellison, and Jonathan Gordon	Nominated	
BAFTA Awards	February 16, 2014	Best Direction	David O. Russell	Nominated	
BAFTA Awards	February 16, 2014	Best Actor in a Leading Role	Christian Bale	Nominated	
BAFTA Awards	February 16, 2014	Best Actress in a Leading Role	Amy Adams	Nominated	
BAFTA Awards	February 16, 2014	Best Actor in a Supporting Role	Bradley Cooper	Nominated	
BAFTA Awards	February 16, 2014	Best Actress in a Supporting Role	Jennifer Lawrence	Won	
BAFTA Awards	February 16, 2014	Best Original Screenplay	David O. Russell and Eric Warren Singer	Won	
BAFTA Awards	February 16, 2014	Best Production Design	Judy Becker	Nominated	
BAFTA Awards	February 16, 2014	Best Costume Design	Michael Wilkinson	Nominated	
BAFTA Awards	February 16, 2014	Best Makeup and Hair	Evelyne Noraz, Lori McCoy-Bell and Kathrine Gordon	Won	
Broadcast Film Critics Association	January 16, 2014	Best Film	American Hustle	Nominated	
Broadcast Film Critics Association	January 16, 2014	Best Director	David O. Russell	Nominated	
Broadcast Film Critics Association	January 16, 2014	Best Actor	Christian Bale	Nominated	
Broadcast Film Critics Association	January 16, 2014	Best Supporting Actor	Bradley Cooper	Nominated	
Broadcast Film Critics Association	January 16, 2014	Best Supporting Actress	Jennifer Lawrence	Nominated	
Broadcast Film Critics Association	January 16, 2014	Best Acting Ensemble	American Hustle	Won	
Broadcast Film Critics Association	January 16, 2014	Best Original Screenplay	Eric Warren Singer and David O. Russell	Nominated	
Broadcast Film Critics Association	January 16, 2014	Best Comedy Film	American Hustle	Won	
Broadcast Film Critics Association	January 16, 2014	Best Actor in a Comedy	Christian Bale	Nominated	
Broadcast Film Critics Association	January 16, 2014	Best Actress in a Comedy	Amy Adams	Won	
Broadcast Film Critics Association	January 16, 2014	Best Costume Design	Michael Wilkinson	Nominated	
Broadcast Film Critics Association	January 16, 2014	Best Editing	Alan Baumgarten, Jay Cassidy, and Crispin Struthers	Nominated	
Broadcast Film Critics Association	January 16, 2014	Best Makeup	American Hustle	Won	
Casting Society of America	January 22, 2015	Big Budget Drama	Mary Vernieu, Lindsay Graham and Angela Peri	Nominated	
Chicago Film Critics Association	December 16, 2013	Best Picture	American Hustle	Nominated	
Chicago Film Critics Association	December 16, 2013	Best Director	David O. Russell	Nominated	
Chicago Film Critics Association	December 16, 2013	Best Supporting Actress	Jennifer Lawrence	Nominated	
Chicago Film Critics Association	December 16, 2013	Best Original Screenplay	Eric Warren Singer and David O. Russell	Nominated	
Chicago Film Critics Association	December 16, 2013	Best Editing	Alan Baumgarten, Jay Cassidy, and Crispin Struthers	Nominated	
Costume Designers Guild	February 22, 2014	Excellence in Period Film	Michael Wilkinson	Nominated	
Dallas–Fort Worth Film Critics Association	December 16, 2013	Best Film	American Hustle	4th Place	
Dallas–Fort Worth Film Critics Association	December 16, 2013	Best Director	David O. Russell	4th Place	
Dallas–Fort Worth Film Critics Association	December 16, 2013	Best Supporting Actress	Jennifer Lawrence	3rd Place	
Detroit Film Critics Society	December 13, 2013	Best Director	David O. Russell	Nominated	
Detroit Film Critics Society	December 13, 2013	Best Actress	Amy Adams	Nominated	
Detroit Film Critics Society	December 13, 2013	Best Supporting Actress	Jennifer Lawrence	Nominated	
Detroit Film Critics Society	December 13, 2013	Best Ensemble	American Hustle	Won	
Detroit Film Critics Society	December 13, 2013	Best Screenplay	Eric Warren Singer and David O. Russell	Nominated	
Directors Guild of America Awards	January 25, 2014	Outstanding Direction – Feature Film	David O. Russell	Nominated	
Dorian Awards	January 21, 2014	Film of the Year	American Hustle	Nominated	
Empire Awards	March 30, 2014	Best Actress	Amy Adams	Nominated	
Empire Awards	March 30, 2014	Best Supporting Actress	Jennifer Lawrence	Nominated	
Florida Film Critics Circle	December 18, 2013	Best Film	American Hustle	2nd Place	
Florida Film Critics Circle	December 18, 2013	Best Supporting Actress	Jennifer Lawrence	Runner-up	
Florida Film Critics Circle	December 18, 2013	Best Original Screenplay	David O. Russell	Runner-up	
Florida Film Critics Circle	December 18, 2013	Best Art Direction/Production Design	Judy Becker and Jesse Rosenthal	Runner-up	
Golden Globe Awards	January 12, 2014	Best Motion Picture – Musical or Comedy	American Hustle	Won	
Golden Globe Awards	January 12, 2014	Best Director – Motion Picture	David O. Russell	Nominated	
Golden Globe Awards	January 12, 2014	Best Performance by an Actor in a Motion Picture – Musical or Comedy	Christian Bale	Nominated	
Golden Globe Awards	January 12, 2014	Best Performance by an Actress in a Motion Picture – Musical or Comedy	Amy Adams	Won	
Golden Globe Awards	January 12, 2014	Best Performance by an Actor in a Supporting Role – Motion Picture	Bradley Cooper	Nominated	
Golden Globe Awards	January 12, 2014	Best Performance by an Actress in a Supporting Role – Motion Picture	Jennifer Lawrence	Won	
Golden Globe Awards	January 12, 2014	Best Screenplay – Motion Picture	Eric Warren Singer and David O. Russell	Nominated	
Hollywood Film Festival	October 21, 2013	Best Costume Design	Michael Wilkinson	Won	
Hollywood Film Festival	October 21, 2013	Best Production Design	Judy Becker	Won	
Houston Film Critics Society	December 15, 2013	Best Picture	American Hustle	Nominated	
Houston Film Critics Society	December 15, 2013	Best Supporting Actress	Jennifer Lawrence	Nominated	
Houston Film Critics Society	December 15, 2013	Best Screenplay	Eric Warren Singer and David O. Russell	Nominated	
Irish Film & Television Awards	April 5, 2014	International Actress	Amy Adams	Nominated	
Location Managers Guild of America	March 29, 2014	Outstanding Achievement by a Location Professional – Feature Film	David Velasco	Nominated	
Location Managers Guild of America	March 29, 2014	Outstanding Location Feature Film	American Hustle	Nominated	
London Film Critics Circle Awards	February 2, 2014	Supporting Actress of the Year	Jennifer Lawrence	Nominated	
London Film Critics Circle Awards	February 2, 2014	British Actor of the Year	Christian Bale (American Hustle and Out of the Furnace)	Nominated	
London Film Critics Circle Awards	February 2, 2014	Technical Achievement	Judy Becker (production design)	Nominated	
Motion Picture Sound Editors Golden Reel Awards	February 16, 2014	Best Sound Editing: Music Score in a Feature Film	Susan Jacobs	Nominated	
Motion Picture Sound Editors Golden Reel Awards	February 16, 2014	Best Sound Editing: Dialogue & ADR in a Feature Film	John Ross	Nominated	
MTV Movie Awards	April 13, 2014	Movie of the Year	American Hustle	Nominated	
MTV Movie Awards	April 13, 2014	Best Male Performance	Bradley Cooper	Nominated	
MTV Movie Awards	April 13, 2014	Best Female Performance	Amy Adams	Nominated	
MTV Movie Awards	April 13, 2014	Best On-Screen Duo	Amy Adams and Christian Bale	Nominated	
MTV Movie Awards	April 13, 2014	Best Kiss	Jennifer Lawrence and Amy Adams	Nominated	
MTV Movie Awards	April 13, 2014	Best Musical Moment	Jennifer Lawrence sings "Live & Let Die"	Nominated	
MTV Movie Awards	April 13, 2014	Best On-Screen Transformation	Christian Bale	Nominated	
MTV Movie Awards	April 13, 2014	Best Cameo	Robert De Niro	Nominated	
National Society of Film Critics	January 4, 2014	Best Supporting Actress	Jennifer Lawrence	Won	
New York Film Critics Circle	December 3, 2013	Best Film	American Hustle	Won	
New York Film Critics Circle	December 3, 2013	Best Actress	Amy Adams	Runner-up	
New York Film Critics Circle	December 3, 2013	Best Supporting Actress	Jennifer Lawrence	Won	
New York Film Critics Circle	December 3, 2013	Best Screenplay	Eric Warren Singer and David O. Russell	Won	
New York Film Critics Online	December 8, 2013	Best Ensemble Cast	American Hustle	Won	
Online Film Critics Society	December 16, 2013	Best Picture	American Hustle	Nominated	
Online Film Critics Society	December 16, 2013	Best Actress	Amy Adams	Nominated	
Online Film Critics Society	December 16, 2013	Best Supporting Actress	Jennifer Lawrence	Nominated	
Online Film Critics Society	December 16, 2013	Best Original Screenplay	Eric Warren Singer and David O. Russell	Nominated	
Palm Springs International Film Festival	January 13, 2014	Best Ensemble	American Hustle	Won	
Producers Guild of America Awards	January 19, 2014	Best Theatrical Motion Picture	American Hustle	Nominated	
San Diego Film Critics Society	December 17, 2013	Best Supporting Actress	Jennifer Lawrence	Nominated	
San Diego Film Critics Society	December 17, 2013	Best Ensemble	American Hustle	Won	
San Francisco Film Critics Circle	December 15, 2013	Best Picture	American Hustle	Nominated	
San Francisco Film Critics Circle	December 15, 2013	Best Director	David O. Russell	Nominated	
San Francisco Film Critics Circle	December 15, 2013	Best Supporting Actress	Jennifer Lawrence	Won	
San Francisco Film Critics Circle	December 15, 2013	Best Original Screenplay	Eric Warren Singer and David O. Russell	Won	
San Francisco Film Critics Circle	December 15, 2013	Best Production Design	Judy Becker	Nominated	
San Francisco Film Critics Circle	December 15, 2013	Best Editing	Alan Baumgarten, Jay Cassidy, and Crispin Struthers	Nominated	
Satellite Awards	February 23, 2014	Best Motion Picture	American Hustle	Nominated	
Satellite Awards	February 23, 2014	Best Director	David O. Russell	Nominated	
Satellite Awards	February 23, 2014	Best Actor – Motion Picture	Christian Bale	Nominated	
Satellite Awards	February 23, 2014	Best Actress – Motion Picture	Amy Adams	Nominated	
Satellite Awards	February 23, 2014	Best Supporting Actor – Motion Picture	Bradley Cooper	Nominated	
Satellite Awards	February 23, 2014	Best Supporting Actress – Motion Picture	Jennifer Lawrence	Nominated	
Satellite Awards	February 23, 2014	Best Original Screenplay	Eric Warren Singer and David O. Russell	Won	
Satellite Awards	February 23, 2014	Best Editing	Alan Baumgarten, Jay Cassidy, and Crispin Struthers	Won	
Screen Actors Guild Awards	January 18, 2014	Outstanding Performance by a Cast in a Motion Picture	Amy Adams, Christian Bale, Louis C.K., Bradley Cooper, Paul Herman, Jack Huston, Jennifer Lawrence, Alessandro Nivola, Michael Peña, Jeremy Renner, Elisabeth Röhm, Shea Whigham	Won	
Screen Actors Guild Awards	January 18, 2014	Outstanding Performance by a Female Actor in a Supporting Role	Jennifer Lawrence	Nominated	
Society of Camera Operators	March 8, 2014	Camera Operator of the Year Award	Geoffrey Haley	Nominated	
St. Louis Film Critics Association	December 16, 2013	Best Film	American Hustle	Runner-up	
St. Louis Film Critics Association	December 16, 2013	Best Director	David O. Russell	Nominated	
St. Louis Film Critics Association	December 16, 2013	Best Actor	Christian Bale	Nominated	
St. Louis Film Critics Association	December 16, 2013	Best Actress	Amy Adams	Nominated	
St. Louis Film Critics Association	December 16, 2013	Best Supporting Actress	Jennifer Lawrence	Nominated	
St. Louis Film Critics Association	December 16, 2013	Best Original Screenplay	Eric Warren Singer and David O. Russell	Runner-up	
St. Louis Film Critics Association	December 16, 2013	Best Soundtrack	American Hustle	Nominated	
Teen Choice Awards	August 10, 2014	Choice Movie – Drama	American Hustle	Nominated	
Teen Choice Awards	August 10, 2014	Choice Movie Actor – Drama	Bradley Cooper	Nominated	
Teen Choice Awards	August 10, 2014	Choice Movie Actress – Drama	Jennifer Lawrence	Nominated	
Toronto Film Critics Association	December 17, 2013	Best Supporting Actress	Jennifer Lawrence	Won	
Vancouver Film Critics Circle	January 7, 2014	Best Supporting Actress	Jennifer Lawrence	Won	
Vancouver Film Critics Circle	January 7, 2014	Best Supporting Actor	Bradley Cooper	Nominated	
Washington D.C. Area Film Critics Association	December 9, 2013	Best Film	American Hustle	Nominated	
Washington D.C. Area Film Critics Association	December 9, 2013	Best Supporting Actress	Jennifer Lawrence	Nominated	
Washington D.C. Area Film Critics Association	December 9, 2013	Best Original Screenplay	Eric Warren Singer and David O. Russell	Nominated	
Washington D.C. Area Film Critics Association	December 9, 2013	Best Acting Ensemble	American Hustle	Nominated	
Writers Guild of America Awards	February 1, 2014	Best Original Screenplay	Eric Warren Singer and David O. Russell	Nominated	

== See also ==
- 2013 in film
