= Chicago Film Critics Association Award for Best Editing =

Annual US film award

The Chicago Film Critics Association Award for Best Editing is an annual award given by the Chicago Film Critics Association since 2012.

== Winners ==
=== 2010s ===
| Year | Film | Editor(s) |
|---|---|---|
| 2012 | Zero Dark Thirty | William Goldenberg and Dylan Tichenor |
| 2012 | Argo | William Goldenberg |
| 2012 | Cloud Atlas | Alexander Berner and Claus Wehlisch |
| 2012 | The Master | Leslie Jones and Peter McNulty |
| 2012 | Skyfall | Stuart Baird |
| 2013 | Gravity | Alfonso Cuarón and Mark Sanger |
| 2013 | 12 Years a Slave | Joe Walker |
| 2013 | American Hustle | Alan Baumgarten, Jay Cassidy, and Crispin Struthers |
| 2013 | Upstream Color | Shane Carruth and David Lowery |
| 2013 | The Wolf of Wall Street | Thelma Schoonmaker |
| 2014 | Whiplash | Tom Cross |
| 2014 | Boyhood | Sandra Adair |
| 2014 | Birdman or (The Unexpected Virtue of Ignorance) | Douglas Crise and Stephen Mirrione |
| 2014 | The Grand Budapest Hotel | Barney Pilling |
| 2014 | Gone Girl | Kirk Baxter |
| 2015 | Mad Max: Fury Road | Jason Ballantine and Margaret Sixel |
| 2015 | The Big Short | Hank Corwin |
| 2015 | The Martian | Pietro Scalia |
| 2015 | The Revenant | Stephen Mirrione |
| 2015 | Spotlight | Tom McArdle |
| 2016 | La La Land | Tom Cross |
| 2016 | Cameraperson | Nels Bangerter |
| 2016 | Jackie | Sebastián Sepúlveda |
| 2016 | Manchester by the Sea | Jennifer Lame |
| 2016 | Moonlight | Joi McMillon and Nat Sanders |
| 2017 | Baby Driver | Paul Machliss and Jonathan Amos |
| 2017 | Call Me by Your Name | Walter Fasano |
| 2017 | Dunkirk | Lee Smith |
| 2017 | The Florida Project | Sean Baker |
| 2017 | Get Out | Gregory Plotkin |
| 2018 | Roma | Alfonso Cuarón and Adam Gough |
| 2018 | First Man | Tom Cross |
| 2018 | The Other Side of the Wind | Orson Welles and Bob Murawski |
| 2018 | Widows | Joe Walker |
| 2018 | You Were Never Really Here | Joe Bini |
| 2019 | The Irishman | Thelma Schoonmaker |
| 2019 | 1917 | Lee Smith |
| 2019 | Little Women | Nick Houy |
| 2019 | Once Upon a Time in Hollywood | Fred Raskin |
| 2019 | Uncut Gems | Ronald Bronstein and Benny Safdie |

=== 2020s ===
| Year | Film | Editor(s) |
|---|---|---|
| 2020 | I'm Thinking of Ending Things | Robert Frazen |
| 2020 | Lovers Rock | Chris Dickens and Steve McQueen |
| 2020 | Nomadland | Chloé Zhao |
| 2020 | Tenet | Jennifer Lame |
| 2020 | The Trial of the Chicago 7 | Alan Baumgarten |
| 2021 | The French Dispatch | Andrew Weisblum |
| 2021 | Drive My Car | Azusa Yamazaki |
| 2021 | Dune | Joe Walker |
| 2021 | The Power of the Dog | Peter Sciberras |
| 2021 | West Side Story | Michael Kahn and Sarah Broshar |
| 2022 | Everything Everywhere All at Once | Paul Rogers |
| 2022 | Aftersun | Blair McClendon |
| 2022 | Babylon | Tom Cross |
| 2022 | Decision to Leave | Kim Sang-beom |
| 2022 | Tár | Monika Willi |

== See also ==
- Academy Award for Best Film Editing
