= Critics' Choice Movie Award for Best Editing =

Award given by the Critics Choice Association

The Critics' Choice Movie Award for Best Editing is one of the Critics' Choice Movie Awards given to people working in the film industry by the Critics Choice Association. It was first given out in 2010.

== Winners and nominees ==
=== 2000s ===
Year	Film	Editor(s)	Ref.
2009	Avatar	James Cameron, John Refoua, and Stephen E. Rivkin	
2009	The Hurt Locker	Chris Innis and Bob Murawski	
2009	Inglourious Basterds	Sally Menke	
2009	Nine	Claire Simpson and Wyatt Smith	
2009	Up in the Air	Dana E. Glauberman	

=== 2010s ===
Year	Film	Editor(s)	Ref.
2010	Inception	Lee Smith	
2010	127 Hours	Jon Harris	
2010	Black Swan	Andrew Weisblum	
2010	The Social Network	Kirk Baxter and Angus Wall	
2011	The Girl with the Dragon Tattoo	Kirk Baxter and Angus Wall	
2011	The Artist	Michel Hazanavicius and Anne-Sophie Bion	
2011	Drive	Matthew Newman	
2011	Hugo	Thelma Schoonmaker	
2011	War Horse	Michael Kahn	
2012	Zero Dark Thirty	William Goldenberg and Dylan Tichenor	
2012	Argo	William Goldenberg	
2012	Les Misérables	Chris Dickens and Melanie Oliver	
2012	Life of Pi	Tim Squyres	
2012	Lincoln	Michael Kahn	
2013	Gravity	Alfonso Cuarón and Mark Sanger	
2013	12 Years a Slave	Joe Walker	
2013	American Hustle	Alan Baumgarten, Jay Cassidy, and Crispin Struthers	
2013	Captain Phillips	Christopher Rouse	
2013	Rush	Daniel P. Hanley and Mike Hill	
2013	The Wolf of Wall Street	Thelma Schoonmaker	
2014	Birdman	Douglas Crise and Stephen Mirrione	
2014	Boyhood	Sandra Adair	
2014	Gone Girl	Kirk Baxter	
2014	Interstellar	Lee Smith	
2014	Whiplash	Tom Cross	
2015	Mad Max: Fury Road	Margaret Sixel	
2015	The Big Short	Hank Corwin	
2015	The Martian	Pietro Scalia	
2015	The Revenant	Stephen Mirrione	
2015	Spotlight	Tom McArdle	
2016	La La Land	Tom Cross	
2016	Arrival	Joe Walker	
2016	Hacksaw Ridge	John Gilbert	
2016	Moonlight	Joi McMillon and Nat Sanders	
2016	Sully	Blu Murray	
2017	Baby Driver (TIE)	Paul Machliss and Jonathan Amos (TIE)	
2017	Dunkirk (TIE)	Lee Smith (TIE)	
2017	Blade Runner 2049	Joe Walker	
2017	The Post	Michael Kahn and Sarah Broshar	
2017	The Shape of Water	Sidney Wolinsky	
2018	First Man	Tom Cross	
2018	The Favourite	Yorgos Mavropsaridis	
2018	Roma	Alfonso Cuarón and Adam Gough	
2018	A Star Is Born	Jay Cassidy	
2018	Vice	Hank Corwin	
2018	Widows	Joe Walker	
2019	1917	Lee Smith	
2019	Ford v Ferrari	Andrew Buckland and Michael McCusker	
2019	The Irishman	Thelma Schoonmaker	
2019	Once Upon a Time in Hollywood	Fred Raskin	
2019	Parasite	Yang Jin-mo	
2019	Uncut Gems	Ronald Bronstein and Benny Safdie	

=== 2020s ===
Year	Film	Editor(s)	Ref.
2020	Sound of Metal (TIE)	Mikkel E. G. Nielsen (TIE)	
2020	The Trial of the Chicago 7 (TIE)	Alan Baumgarten (TIE)	
2020	The Father	Yorgos Lamprinos	
2020	Mank	Kirk Baxter	
2020	Nomadland	Chloé Zhao	
2020	Tenet	Jennifer Lame	
2021	West Side Story	Michael Kahn and Sarah Broshar	
2021	Belfast	Úna Ní Dhonghaíle	
2021	Dune	Joe Walker	
2021	Licorice Pizza	Andy Jurgensen	
2021	The Power of the Dog	Peter Sciberras	
2022	Everything Everywhere All at Once	Paul Rogers	
2022	Avatar: The Way of Water	Stephen E. Rivkin, David Brenner, John Refoua, and James Cameron	
2022	Babylon	Tom Cross	
2022	Elvis	Matt Villa and Jonathan Redmond	
2022	Tár	Monika Willi	
2022	Top Gun: Maverick	Eddie Hamilton	
2023	Oppenheimer	Jennifer Lame	
2023	Air	William Goldenberg	
2023	Barbie	Nick Houy	
2023	Poor Things	Yorgos Mavropsaridis	
2023	Killers of the Flower Moon	Thelma Schoonmaker	
2023	Maestro	Michelle Tesoro	
2024	Challengers	Marco Costa	
2024	Anora	Sean Baker	
2024	Conclave	Nick Emerson	
2024	The Brutalist	Dávid Jancsó	
2024	Dune: Part Two	Joe Walker	
2024	September 5	Hansjörg Weißbrich	
2025	F1	Stephen Mirrione	
2025	A House of Dynamite	Kirk Baxter	
2025	Marty Supreme	Ronald Bronstein and Josh Safdie	
2025	One Battle After Another	Andy Jurgensen	
2025	The Perfect Neighbor	Viridiana Lieberman	
2025	Sinners	Michael P. Shawver	

== Multiple winners ==
3 wins

- Lee Smith

2 wins

- Tom Cross
- Stephen Mirrione

== Multiple nominees (3 or more) ==
6 nominations

- Joe Walker

4 nominations

- Kirk Baxter
- Tom Cross
- Michael Kahn
- Thelma Schoonmaker
- Lee Smith

3 nominations

- William Goldenberg
- Stephen Mirrione

== See also ==
- BAFTA Award for Best Editing
- Academy Award for Best Film Editing
- Independent Spirit Award for Best Editing
- American Cinema Editors Award for Best Edited Feature Film – Dramatic
- American Cinema Editors Award for Best Edited Feature Film – Comedy or Musical
