= Satellite Award for Best Editing =

Award from the International Press Academy

- Awarded for: Best Editing
- Country: United States
- Presented by: International Press Academy
- First award: 1996
- Currently held by: Kevin Tent – The Holdovers (2023)
- Website: www.pressacademy.com

The Satellite Award for Best Editing is one of the annual Satellite Awards given by the International Press Academy.

== Winners and nominees ==
=== 1990s ===
Year	Film	Editor(s)
1996	Independence Day	David Brenner
1996	The English Patient	Walter Murch
1996	Fargo	Roderick Jaynes
1996	Mission: Impossible	Paul Hirsch
1996	Romeo + Juliet	Jill Bilcock
1997	Titanic	Conrad Buff IV and Richard A. Harris
1997	Air Force One	Richard Francis-Bruce
1997	Amistad	Michael Kahn
1997	Boogie Nights	Dylan Tichenor
1997	L.A. Confidential	Peter Honess
1998	Saving Private Ryan	Michael Kahn
1998	Beloved	Andy Keir and Carol Littleton
1998	Pleasantville	William Goldenberg
1998	Shakespeare in Love	David Gamble
1998	The Thin Red Line	Leslie Jones, Saar Klein, and Billy Weber
1999	The Sixth Sense	Andrew Mondshein
1999	American Beauty	Tariq Anwar and Christopher Greenbury
1999	Buena Vista Social Club	Brian Johnson
1999	The Insider	William Goldenberg, David Rosenbloom, and Paul Rubell
1999	Sleepy Hollow	Chris Lebenzon and Joel Negron
1999	The Talented Mr. Ripley	Walter Murch

=== 2000s ===
Year	Film	Editor(s)
2000	Thirteen Days	Conrad Buff IV
2000	Crouching Tiger, Hidden Dragon (Wo hu cang long)	Tim Squyres
2000	Gladiator	Pietro Scalia
2000	Mission: Impossible 2	Steven Kemper and Christian Wagner
2000	Traffic	Stephen Mirrione
2001	The Lord of the Rings: The Fellowship of the Ring	John Gilbert
2001	Amélie (Le fabuleux destin d'Amélie Poulain)	Hervé Schneid
2001	A Beautiful Mind	Daniel P. Hanley and Mike Hill
2001	Harry Potter and the Sorcerer's Stone	Richard Francis-Bruce
2001	Moulin Rouge!	Jill Bilcock
2002	Gangs of New York	Thelma Schoonmaker
2002	Adaptation	Eric Zumbrunnen
2002	Insomnia	Dody Dorn
2002	The Lord of the Rings: The Two Towers	Michael J. Horton
2002	One Hour Photo	Jeffrey Ford
2003	The Last Samurai	Victor Du Bois and Steven Rosenblum
2003	House of Sand and Fog	Lisa Zeno Churgin
2003	The Lord of the Rings: The Return of the King	Jamie Selkirk
2003	Master and Commander: The Far Side of the World	Lee Smith
2003	Mystic River	Joel Cox
2003	Seabiscuit	William Goldenberg
2004	Collateral	Jim Miller and Paul Rubell
2004	The Aviator	Thelma Schoonmaker
2004	Closer	John Bloom and Antonia Van Drimmelen
2004	House of Flying Daggers (Shi mian mai fu)	Long Cheng
2004	Lemony Snicket's A Series of Unfortunate Events	Dylan Tichenor
2004	Spider-Man 2	Bob Murawski
2005	Brokeback Mountain	Geraldine Peroni and Dylan Tichenor
2005	Good Night, and Good Luck	Stephen Mirrione
2005	Jarhead	Walter Murch
2005	Kung Fu Hustle (Kung Fu)	Angie Lam
2005	Sin City	Robert Rodriguez
2005	War of the Worlds	Michael Kahn
2006	X-Men: The Last Stand	Mark Goldblatt, Mark Helfrich, and Julia Wong
2006	Babel	Douglas Crise and Stephen Mirrione
2006	Dreamgirls	Virginia Katz
2006	Flags of Our Fathers	Joel Cox
2006	Miami Vice	William Goldenberg and Paul Rubell
2007	American Gangster	Pietro Scalia
2007	The Bourne Ultimatum	Christopher Rouse
2007	Eastern Promises	Ronald Sanders
2007	La Vie en Rose (La Môme)	Richard Marizy
2007	The Lookout	Jill Savitt
2007	No Country for Old Men	Roderick Jaynes
2008	Iron Man	Dan Lebental
2008	Australia	Dody Dorn and Michael McCusker
2008	The Dark Knight	Lee Smith
2008	Frost/Nixon	Daniel P. Hanley and Mike Hill
2008	Quantum of Solace	Matt Chessé and Rick Pearson
2008	Slumdog Millionaire	Chris Dickens
2009	The Hurt Locker	Chris Innis and Bob Murawski
2009	2012	David Brenner and Peter S. Elliot
2009	District 9	Julian Clarke
2009	It Might Get Loud	Greg Finton
2009	Nine	Claire Simpson and Wyatt Smith
2009	Red Cliff (Chi bi)	Robert A. Ferretti, Yang Hongyu, Angie Lam, and David Wu

=== 2010s ===
Year	Film	Editor(s)
2010	Please Give	Robert Frazen
2010	Inception	Lee Smith
2010	Shutter Island	Thelma Schoonmaker
2010	The Social Network	Kirk Baxter and Angus Wall
2010	The Town	Dylan Tichenor
2010	Unstoppable	Robert Duffy and Chris Lebenzon
2011	The Guard	Chris Gill
2011	The Descendants	Kevin Tent
2011	Drive	Mat Newman
2011	Shame	Joe Walker
2011	War Horse	Michael Kahn
2011	Warrior	Sean Albertson, Matt Chessé, John Gilroy, and Aaron Marshall
2012	Silver Linings Playbook	Jay Cassidy and Crispin Struthers
2012	Cloud Atlas	Alexander Berner
2012	Flight	Jeremiah O'Driscoll
2012	Les Misérables	Chris Dickens and Melanie Ann Oliver
2012	The Sessions	Lisa Bromwell
2012	Zero Dark Thirty	Dylan Tichenor and William Goldenberg
2013	American Hustle	Alan Baumgarten, Jay Cassidy, and Crispin Struthers
2013	12 Years a Slave	Joe Walker
2013	Gravity	Alfonso Cuarón and Mark Sanger
2013	Prisoners	Joel Cox and Gary D. Roach
2013	Rush	Daniel P. Hanley and Mike Hill
2013	The Wolf of Wall Street	Thelma Schoonmaker
2014	Dawn of the Planet of the Apes	William Hoy and Stan Salfas
2014	American Sniper	Joel Cox and Gary D. Roach
2014	Birdman	Douglas Crise and Stephen Mirrione
2014	Boyhood	Sandra Adair
2014	Fury	Jay Cassidy and Dody Dorn
2014	The Imitation Game	William Goldenberg
2015	Sicario	Joe Walker
2015	Bridge of Spies	Michael Kahn
2015	Carol	Affonso Gonçalves
2015	The Martian	Pietro Scalia
2015	Spectre	Lee Smith
2015	Steve Jobs	Elliot Graham
2016	Hacksaw Ridge	John Gilbert
2016	Billy Lynn's Long Halftime Walk	Tim Squyres
2016	The Birth of a Nation	Steven Rosenblum
2016	La La Land	Tom Cross
2016	Lion	Alexandre de Franceschi
2016	Moonlight	Joi McMillon and Nat Sanders
2017	War for the Planet of the Apes	William Hoy and Stan Salfas
2017	Baby Driver	Paul Machliss and Jonathan Amos
2017	Darkest Hour	Valerio Bonelli
2017	Dunkirk	Lee Smith
2017	The Shape of Water	Sidney Wolinsky
2017	Three Billboards Outside Ebbing, Missouri	Jon Gregory
2018	Roma	Alfonso Cuarón
2018	BlacKkKlansman	Barry Alexander Brown
2018	First Man	Tom Cross
2018	If Beale Street Could Talk	Joi McMillon and Nat Sanders
2018	A Star Is Born	Jay Cassidy
2018	Widows	Joe Walker
2019	Ford v Ferrari	Andrew Buckland and Michael McCusker
2019	1917	Lee Smith
2019	The Irishman	Thelma Schoonmaker
2019	Joker	Jeff Groth
2019	Marriage Story	Jennifer Lame
2019	Rocketman	Chris Dickens

=== 2020s ===
Year	Film	Editor(s)
2020	The Trial of the Chicago 7	Alan Baumgarten
2020	The Father	Yorgos Lamprinos
2020	Mank	Kirk Baxter
2020	Minari	Harry Yoon
2020	Nomadland	Chloé Zhao
2020	One Night in Miami...	Tariq Anwar
2021	Dune	Joe Walker
2021	Belfast	Úna Ní Dhonghaíle
2021	King Richard	Pamela Martin
2021	Licorice Pizza	Andy Jurgensen
2021	The Power of the Dog	Peter Sciberras
2021	tick, tick... BOOM!	Myron Kerstein and Andrew Weisblum
2022	Everything Everywhere All at Once	Paul Rogers
2022	Elvis	Jonathan Redmond and Matt Villa
2022	The Fabelmans	Sarah Broshar and Michael Khan
2022	Tár	Monika Willi
2022	Top Gun: Maverick	Eddie Hamilton
2022	The Woman King	Terilyn A. Shropshire
2023	The Holdovers	Kevin Tent
2023	Barbie	Nick Houy
2023	Killers of the Flower Moon	Thelma Schoonmaker
2023	Maestro	Michelle Tesoro
2023	Oppenheimer	Jennifer Lame
2023	Poor Things	Yorgos Mavropsaridis
