= San Francisco Film Critics Circle Awards 2013 =

Annual US film awards ceremony

12th SFFCC Awards

December 15, 2013

Best Picture:
12 Years a Slave

The 12th San Francisco Film Critics Circle Awards, honoring the best in film for 2013, were given on 15 December 2013.

== Winners ==
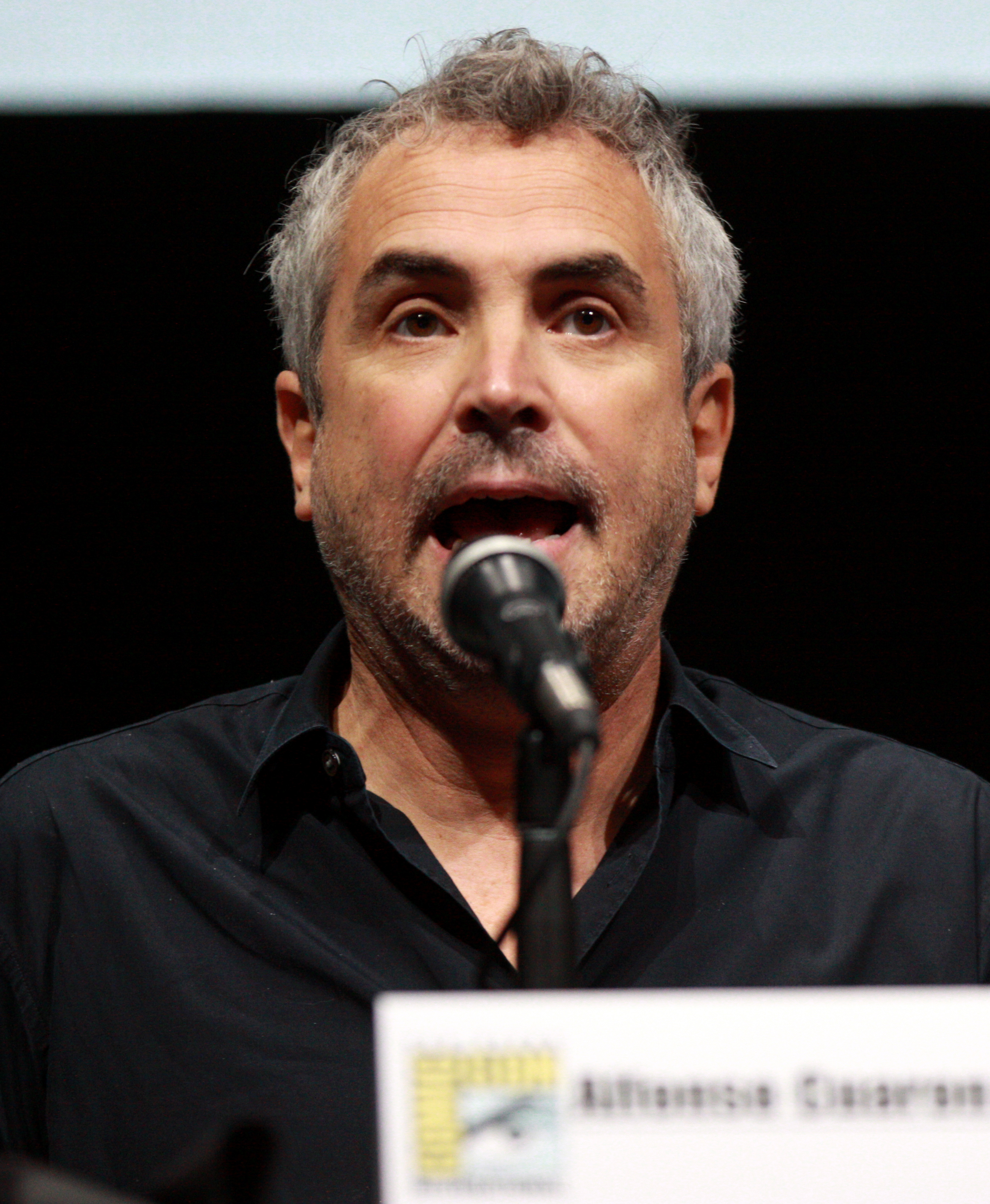
Alfonso Cuarón, Best Director winner

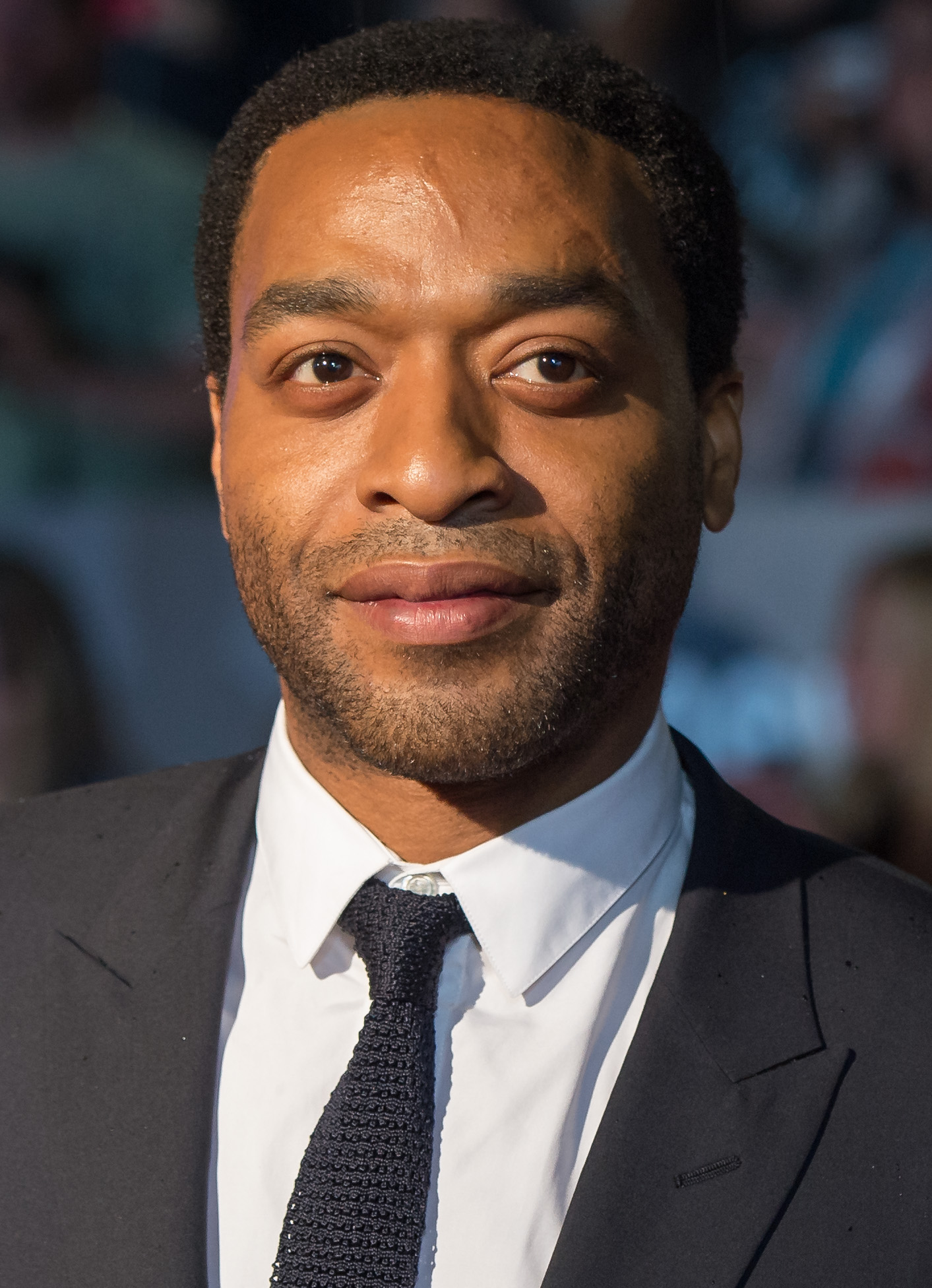
Chiwetel Ejiofor, Best Actor winner

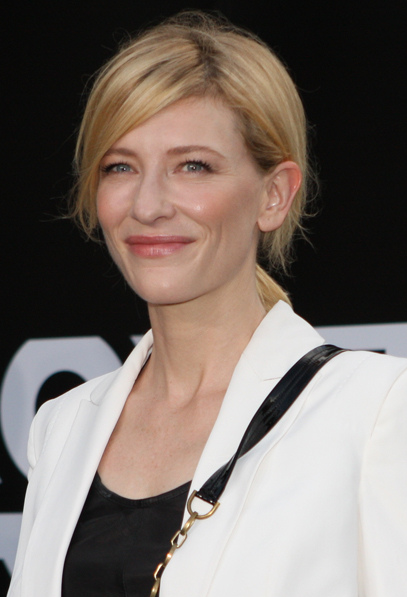
Cate Blanchett, Best Actress winner

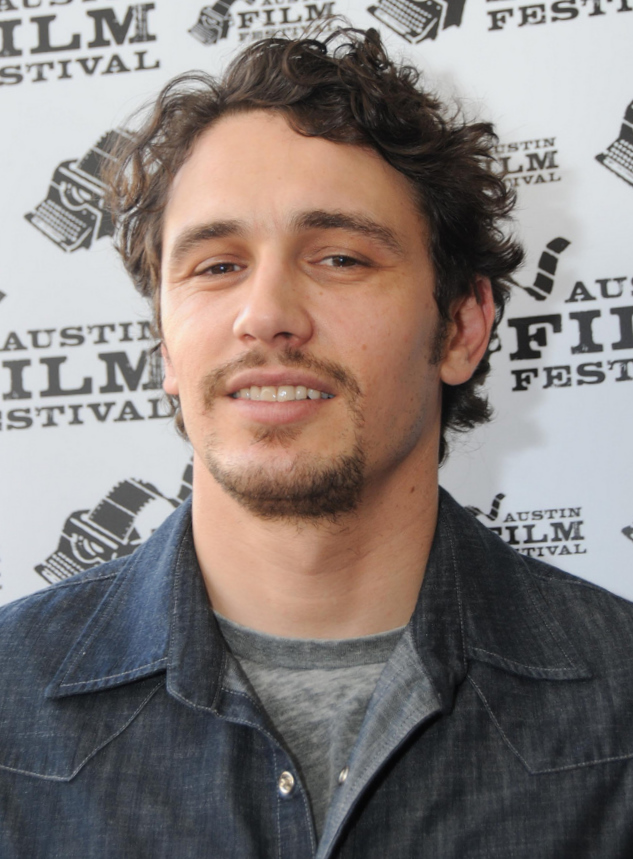
James Franco, Best Supporting Actor winner

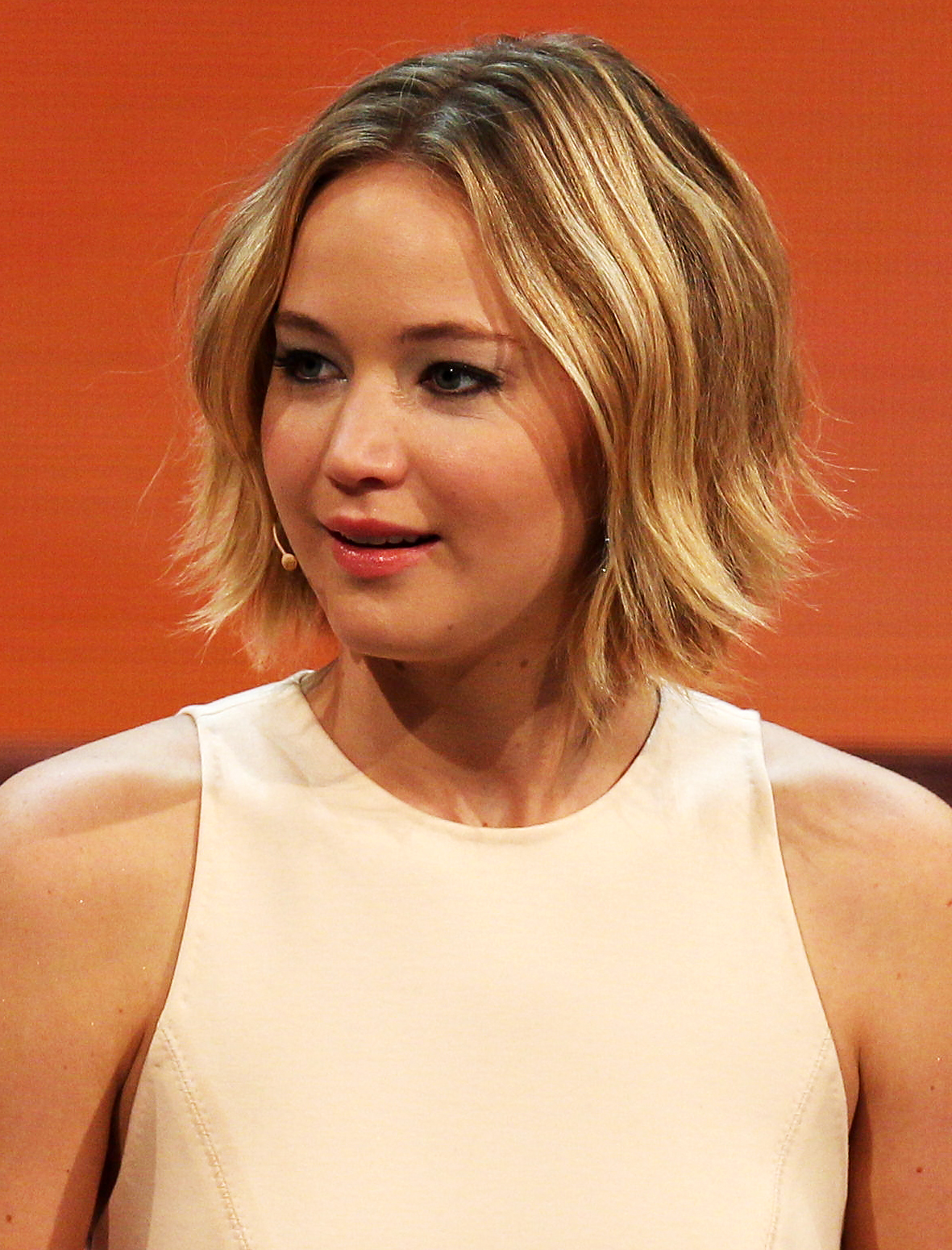
Jennifer Lawrence, Best Supporting Actress winner

- Best Picture:
  - 12 Years a Slave
- Best Director:
  - Alfonso Cuarón – Gravity
- Best Original Screenplay:
  - American Hustle – David O. Russell and Eric Warren Singer
- Best Adapted Screenplay:
  - 12 Years a Slave – John Ridley
- Best Actor:
  - Chiwetel Ejiofor – 12 Years a Slave
- Best Actress:
  - Cate Blanchett – Blue Jasmine
- Best Supporting Actor:
  - James Franco – Spring Breakers
- Best Supporting Actress:
  - Jennifer Lawrence – American Hustle
- Best Animated Feature:
  - Frozen
- Best Foreign Language Film:
  - Blue Is the Warmest Colour • France
- Best Documentary:
  - The Act of Killing
- Best Cinematography:
  - Gravity – Emmanuel Lubezki
- Best Film Editing:
  - Gravity – Alfonso Cuarón and Mark Sanger
- Best Production Design:
  - Gravity – Andy Nicholson
- Marlon Riggs Award (for courage & vision in the Bay Area film community):
  - Ryan Coogler – Fruitvale Station
- Special Citation (for under-appreciated independent cinema):
  - Computer Chess
