= Alan Baumgarten =

American film editor

- Born: February 1, 1957 (age 69)
- Other name: Alan E. Baumgarten
- Occupation: Film editor
- Years active: 1981–present

Alan Baumgarten (born February 1, 1957) is an American film editor.

== Career ==
Baumgarten frequently collaborates with directors Jay Roach and Ruben Fleischer having edited four of their feature films. He has been nominated twice for the Academy Award for Best Film Editing, for American Hustle (2013), together with co-editors Jay Cassidy and Crispin Struthers, and The Trial of the Chicago 7 (2020).

== Filmography ==
Year	Film	Director	Notes
1990	Captain America	Albert Pyun	Additional editor
1991	Kickboxer 2	Albert Pyun	
1992	Dead On: Relentless II	Michael Schroeder	
1992	The Lawnmower Man	Brett Leonard	
1993	Excessive Force	Jon Hess	
1995	Lord of Illusions	Clive Barker	
1998	The Jungle Book: Mowgli's Story	Nick Marck	
1999	The Adventures of Elmo in Grouchland	Gary Halvorson	
2003	Monte Walsh	Simon Wincer	Direct-to-video
2003	See Jane Date	Robert Berlinger	Television film
2004	DodgeBall: A True Underdog Story	Rawson M. Thurber	Co-edited with Peter Teschner
2004	Meet the Fockers	Jay Roach	Co-edited with Jon Poll and Lee Haxall
2005	Fever Pitch	Farrelly brothers	
2007	The Heartbreak Kid	Farrelly brothers	Co-edited with Sam Seig
2007	Charlie Bartlett	Jon Poll	
2007	Mr. Woodcock	Craig Gillespie	
2008	Recount	Jay Roach	Television film ACE Eddie Award for Best Edited Miniseries or Motion Picture for Television; Primetime Emmy Award for Outstanding Single-Camera Picture Editing for a Limited Series or Movie
2009	Funny People	Judd Apatow	Additional editor
2009	Zombieland	Ruben Fleischer	Co-edited with Peter Amundson
2010	Dinner for Schmucks	Jay Roach	Co-edited with Jon Poll
2011	The Muppets	James Bobin	Additional editor
2011	30 Minutes or Less	Ruben Fleischer	
2013	Gangster Squad	Ruben Fleischer	Co-edited with James Herbert
2013	American Hustle	David O. Russell	Co-edited with Jay Cassidy and Crispin Struthers; ACE Eddie Award for Best Edited Feature Film – Comedy or Musical; Satellite Award for Best Editing; Nominated — Academy Award for Best Film Editing; Nominated — AWFJ Award for Best Editing; Nominated — Chicago Film Critics Association Award for Best Editing; Nominated — Critics' Choice Movie Award for Best Editing; Nominated — Gold Derby Award for Best Film Editing; Nominated — Hollywood Post Alliance Award for Best Editing - Feature Film; Nominated — Online Film & Television Association Award for Best Editing; Nominated — Phoenix Film Critics Society Award for Best Editing; Nominated — San Francisco Film Critics Circle Award for Best Editing
2015	Joy	David O. Russell	Co-edited with Christopher Tellefsen, Jay Cassidy and Tom Cross; Nominated — ACE Eddie Award for Best Edited Feature Film – Comedy or Musical
2015	Trumbo	Jay Roach	
2017	Molly's Game	Aaron Sorkin	Co-edited with Elliot Graham and Josh Schaeffer; Hawaii Film Critics Society Award for Best Editing; Nominated — ACE Eddie Award for Best Edited Feature Film - Dramatic
2018	The Cloverfield Paradox	Julius Onah	Co-edited with Matt Evans and Rebecca Valente
2018	Venom	Ruben Fleischer	Co-edited with Maryann Brandon
2019	Charlie's Angels	Elizabeth Banks	Co-edited with Mary Jo Markey
2020	The Trial of the Chicago 7	Aaron Sorkin	ACE Eddie Award for Best Edited Feature Film - Dramatic; Critics' Choice Movie Award for Best Editing; Satellite Award for Best Editing; Nominated — Academy Award for Best Film Editing; Nominated — AWFJ Award for Best Editing; Nominated — BAFTA Award for Best Editing; Nominated — Chicago Film Critics Association Award for Best Editing; Nominated — Hollywood Critics Association Award for Best Editing; Nominated — Online Film Critics Society Award for Best Editing; Nominated — San Diego Film Critics Society Award for Best Editing; Nominated — San Francisco Bay Area Film Critics Circle Award for Best Editing; Nominated — St. Louis Film Critics Association Award for Best Editing; Nominated — Washington D.C. Area Film Critics Association Award for Best Editing
2021	Being the Ricardos	Aaron Sorkin	
2025	Lilo & Stitch	Dean Fleischer Camp	Additional editor
2025	Rental Family	Hikari	Co-edited with Thomas A. Krueger
2026	The Social Reckoning	Aaron Sorkin	
2026	Madden	David O. Russell	Co-edited with Jon Poll and Mike Azevedo

=== Television ===
- Eerie, Indiana (1991)
