= Pamela Martin (film editor) =

American film and TV editor

- Occupation: Film editor

Pamela Martin is an American film and television editor with more than twenty-eight feature film credits since the 1990s. She is best known for her works on The Fighter, directed by David O. Russell, earning an Academy Award nomination for Best Film Editing, and King Richard, directed by Reinaldo Marcus Green, being nominated at the Satellite Award for Best Editing and earning her second Academy Award nomination for Best Film Editing.

Martin has been selected as a member of the American Cinema Editors and she was also a member of the dramatic jury at the Sundance Film Festival in 2007.

== Filmography ==
Martin's feature film credits as editor are tabulated below.

Year	Film	Director	Other notes
1994	Spanking the Monkey	David O. Russell	
1996	Ripper	Phil Parmet	Video game
1996	Ed's Next Move	John Walsh	
1996	The Substance of Fire	Daniel J. Sullivan	Adapted from a play
1997	The House of Yes	Mark Waters	
1998	Slums of Beverly Hills	Tamara Jenkins	
2000	Gun Shy	Eric Blakeney	
2000	How to Kill Your Neighbor's Dog	Michael Kalesniko	
2001	Bubble Boy	Blair Hayes	
2002	Warning: Parental Advisory	Mark Waters	Television film
2004	Saved!	Brian Dannelly	
2005	Weeds	Brian Dannelly	TV Episode: "You Can't Miss the Bear"
2006	Little Miss Sunshine	Jonathan Dayton and Valerie Faris	
2009	Youth in Revolt	Miguel Arteta	
2010	The Fighter	David O. Russell	
2012	Ruby Sparks	Jonathan Dayton and Valerie Faris	
2012	Hitchcock	Sacha Gervasi	
2014	Alexander and the Terrible, Horrible, No Good, Very Bad Day	Miguel Arteta	
2016	Free State of Jones	Gary Ross	
2017	Battle of the Sexes	Jonathan Dayton and Valerie Faris	
2018	Operation Finale	Chris Weitz	
2019	Seberg	Benedict Andrews	
2020	Downhill	Nat Faxon and Jim Rash	
2021	King Richard	Reinaldo Marcus Green	
2024	Bob Marley: One Love	Reinaldo Marcus Green	
2025	Springsteen: Deliver Me from Nowhere	Scott Cooper	

== Awards and nominations ==
Award	Year	Category	Work	Result	Ref.
Academy Award	2011	Best Film Editing	The Fighter	Nominated	
Academy Award	2022	Best Film Editing	King Richard	Nominated	
American Cinema Editors Awards	2007	Best Edited Feature Film - Comedy or Musical	Little Miss Sunshine	Nominated	
American Cinema Editors Awards	2010	Best Edited Feature Film - Dramatic	The Fighter	Nominated	
American Cinema Editors Awards	2022	Best Edited Feature Film - Dramatic	King Richard	Won	
Black Reel Awards	2022	Outstanding Editing	King Richard	Nominated	
Hollywood Critics Association Awards	2022	Best Film Editing	King Richard	Nominated	
Satellite Awards	2022	Best Film Editing	King Richard	Nominated	

== See also ==
- List of film director and editor collaborations – Martin has edited Spanking the Monkey (1994) and The Fighter (2010) with director David O. Russell.
- List of film director and editor collaborations – Martin has edited "Battle of the Sexes" (2017), "Ruby Sparks" (2012), and "Little Miss Sunshine" (2006) with directors Jonathan Dayton and Valerie Faris.
