= David Gamble (film editor) =

British film editor (1955–2026)

- Born: 24 June 1955; Derry, Northern Ireland
- Died: 12 June 2026 (aged 70)
- Occupation: Film editor
- Years active: 1988–2026

David Gamble (24 June 1955 – 12 June 2026) was a British film editor. He was nominated at the 71st Academy Awards for Best Film Editing for the film Shakespeare in Love. He also won the BAFTA Award in 1998, for the same film.

Gamble died in 12 June 2026, aged 70.

== Selected filmography ==
- Shopgirl (2005)
- Veronica Guerin (2003)
- Shakespeare in Love (1998)
