= Academy Award for Best Film Editing =

Annual award for best film editing

- Country: United States
- Presented by: Academy of Motion Picture Arts and Sciences (AMPAS)
- First award: February 27, 1935; 91 years ago (for films released in 1934)
- Most recent winner: Andy Jurgensen; One Battle After Another (2025)
- Website: oscars.org

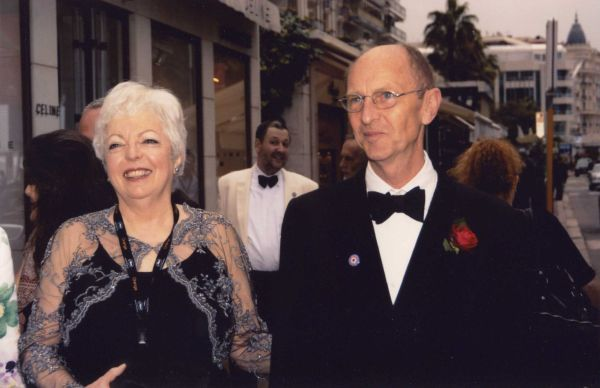
Thelma Schoonmaker (left) and Columba Powell (right) at the 2009 Cannes Film Festival. Schoonmaker is among the deans of film editing; Powell is the son of Michael Powell, a prominent film director to whom Schoonmaker was married until his death in 1990.

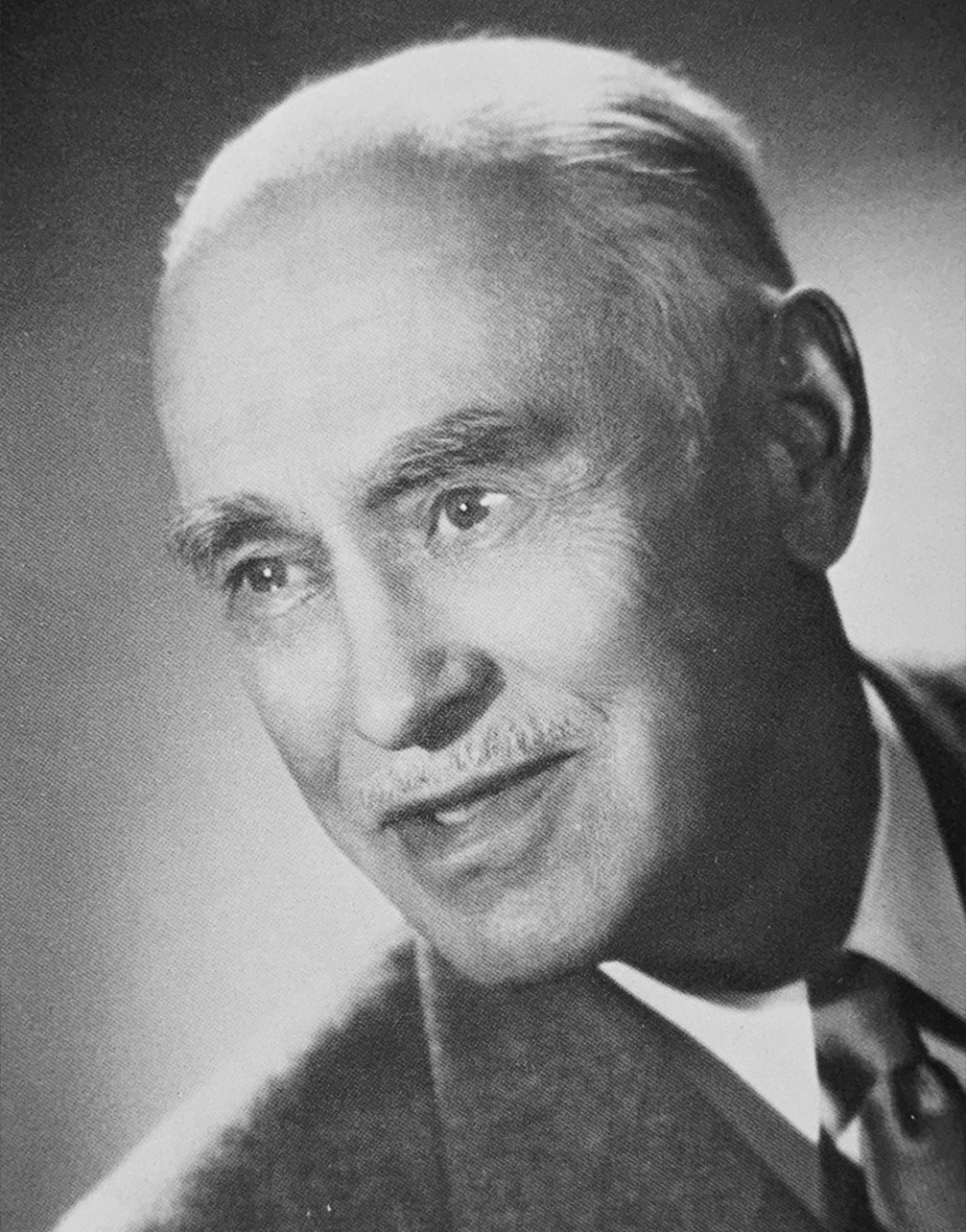
Conrad A. Nervig was the inaugural winner, winning for Eskimo (1933). He also won for King Solomon's Mines (1950), alongside Ralph E. Winters.

The Academy Award for Best Film Editing is one of the annual awards of the Academy of Motion Picture Arts and Sciences (AMPAS). Nominations for this award are closely correlated with the Academy Award for Best Picture. For 33 consecutive years, 1981 to 2013, every Best Picture winner had also been nominated for the Film Editing Oscar, and only 38 of the 98 Best Picture winners have also won for Film Editing. Only the principal, "above the line" editor(s) as listed in the film's credits are named on the award; additional editors, supervising editors, etc. are not currently eligible.

The nominations for this Academy Award are determined by a ballot of the voting members of the Editing Branch of the academy; there were 220 members of the Editing Branch in 2012. The members may vote for up to five of the eligible films in the order of their preference; the five films with the largest vote totals are selected as nominees. The Academy Award itself is selected from the nominated films by a subsequent ballot of all active and life members of the academy. This process is essentially the reverse of that of the British Academy of Film and Television Arts (BAFTA); nominations for the BAFTA Award for Best Editing are done by a general ballot of academy voters, and the winner is selected by members of the editing chapter.

== History ==
This award was first given for films released in 1934. The name of this award is occasionally changed; in 2008, it was listed as the Academy Award for Achievement in Film Editing.

Four film editors have won this award three times in their career:

- Ralph Dawson won for A Midsummer Night's Dream (1935), Anthony Adverse (1936), and The Adventures of Robin Hood (1938)
- Daniel Mandell won for The Pride of the Yankees (1942), The Best Years of Our Lives (1946), and The Apartment (1960).
- Michael Kahn won for Raiders of the Lost Ark (1981), Schindler's List (1993), and Saving Private Ryan (1998).
- Thelma Schoonmaker won for Raging Bull (1980), The Aviator (2004), and The Departed (2006).

To date, three film directors have won this award: James Cameron, Alfonso Cuarón, and Sean Baker, for the films Titanic, Gravity, and Anora, respectively. Directors David Lean, Steve James, Joel Coen and Ethan Coen (under the alias "Roderick Jaynes"), Michel Hazanavicius, Jean-Marc Vallée (under the alias "John Mac McMurphy"), Chloé Zhao, and Josh Safdie have been nominated for editing their own films as well, with Cameron, Cuarón, and the Coens each being nominated for the award twice. Also, Best Film Editing winner, Walter Murch, although known for film editing and sound, directed the Oscar nominated Return to Oz, and is, to date, the only person with Oscars for both sound engineering and film editing—winning them in the same year for his work on The English Patient.

Additionally, former film editors Robert Wise (nominee for Citizen Kane), Hal Ashby (winner for In the Heat of the Night), and Francis D. Lyon (co-winner for Body and Soul) became directors whose films were subsequently nominated for Best Film Editing themselves. These films include Somebody Up There Likes Me, I Want to Live!, West Side Story, The Sound of Music, The Sand Pebbles, and The Andromeda Strain for Wise; Bound for Glory and Coming Home for Ashby; and Crazylegs for Lyon.

== Superlatives ==
Category	Name	Superlative	Year	Notes
Most awards	Thelma Schoonmaker	3 awards	2006	Awards resulted from 9 nominations
Most awards	Michael Kahn	3 awards	1998	Awards resulted from 8 nominations
Most awards	Daniel Mandell	3 awards	1960	Awards resulted from 5 nominations
Most awards	Ralph Dawson	3 awards	1938	Awards resulted from 4 nominations
Most nominations	Thelma Schoonmaker	9 nominations	2023	Nominations resulted in 3 awards
Most nominations without a win	Frederic Knudtson	6 nominations	1963	Nominations resulted in no awards
Most nominations without a win	Gerry Hambling	6 nominations	1996	Nominations resulted in no awards
Oldest winner	Michael Kahn	Age 68	1998	
Oldest nominee	Thelma Schoonmaker	Age 84	2023	
Youngest winner	David Brenner	Age 27	1989	Co-edited with Joe Hutshing

Superlatives taken from a document published by the Academy of Motion Picture Arts and Sciences.

== Winners and nominees ==
These listings are based on the Awards Database maintained by the Academy of Motion Picture Arts and Sciences.

indicates the winner

=== 1930s ===
Year	Film	Nominees
1934 (7th)	Eskimo	Conrad A. Nervig
1934 (7th)	Cleopatra	Anne Bauchens
1934 (7th)	One Night of Love	Gene Milford
1935 (8th)	A Midsummer Night's Dream	Ralph Dawson
1935 (8th)	David Copperfield	Robert J. Kern
1935 (8th)	The Informer	George Hively
1935 (8th)	Les Misérables	Barbara McLean
1935 (8th)	The Lives of a Bengal Lancer	Ellsworth Hoagland
1935 (8th)	Mutiny on the Bounty	Margaret Booth
1936 (9th)	Anthony Adverse	Ralph Dawson
1936 (9th)	Come and Get It	Edward Curtiss
1936 (9th)	The Great Ziegfeld	William S. Gray
1936 (9th)	Lloyd's of London	Barbara McLean
1936 (9th)	A Tale of Two Cities	Conrad A. Nervig
1936 (9th)	Theodora Goes Wild	Otto Meyer
1937 (10th)	Lost Horizon	Gene Havlick and Gene Milford
1937 (10th)	The Awful Truth	Al Clark
1937 (10th)	Captains Courageous	Elmo Veron
1937 (10th)	The Good Earth	Basil Wrangell
1937 (10th)	One Hundred Men and a Girl	Bernard W. Burton
1938 (11th)	The Adventures of Robin Hood	Ralph Dawson
1938 (11th)	Alexander's Ragtime Band	Barbara McLean
1938 (11th)	The Great Waltz	Tom Held
1938 (11th)	Test Pilot	Tom Held
1938 (11th)	You Can't Take It with You	Gene Havlick
1939 (12th)	Gone with the Wind	Hal C. Kern and James E. Newcom
1939 (12th)	Goodbye, Mr. Chips	Charles Frend
1939 (12th)	Mr. Smith Goes to Washington	Gene Havlick and Al Clark
1939 (12th)	The Rains Came	Barbara McLean
1939 (12th)	Stagecoach	Otho Lovering and Dorothy Spencer

=== 1940s ===
Year	Film	Nominees
1940 (13th)	North West Mounted Police	Anne Bauchens
1940 (13th)	The Grapes of Wrath	Robert L. Simpson
1940 (13th)	The Letter	Warren Low
1940 (13th)	The Long Voyage Home	Sherman Todd
1940 (13th)	Rebecca	Hal C. Kern
1941 (14th)	Sergeant York	William Holmes
1941 (14th)	Citizen Kane	Robert Wise
1941 (14th)	Dr. Jekyll and Mr. Hyde	Harold F. Kress
1941 (14th)	How Green Was My Valley	James B. Clark
1941 (14th)	The Little Foxes	Daniel Mandell
1942 (15th)	The Pride of the Yankees	Daniel Mandell
1942 (15th)	Mrs. Miniver	Harold F. Kress
1942 (15th)	The Talk of the Town	Otto Meyer
1942 (15th)	This Above All	Walter Thompson
1942 (15th)	Yankee Doodle Dandy	George Amy
1943 (16th)	Air Force	George Amy
1943 (16th)	Casablanca	Owen Marks
1943 (16th)	Five Graves to Cairo	Doane Harrison
1943 (16th)	For Whom the Bell Tolls	Sherman Todd and John F. Link Sr.
1943 (16th)	The Song of Bernadette	Barbara McLean
1944 (17th)	Wilson	Barbara McLean
1944 (17th)	Going My Way	LeRoy Stone
1944 (17th)	Janie	Owen Marks
1944 (17th)	None but the Lonely Heart	Roland Gross
1944 (17th)	Since You Went Away	Hal C. Kern and James E. Newcom
1945 (18th)	National Velvet	Robert J. Kern
1945 (18th)	The Bells of St. Mary's	Harry Marker
1945 (18th)	The Lost Weekend	Doane Harrison
1945 (18th)	Objective, Burma!	George Amy
1945 (18th)	A Song to Remember	Charles Nelson
1946 (19th)	The Best Years of Our Lives	Daniel Mandell
1946 (19th)	It's a Wonderful Life	William Hornbeck
1946 (19th)	The Jolson Story	William A. Lyon
1946 (19th)	The Killers	Arthur Hilton
1946 (19th)	The Yearling	Harold F. Kress
1947 (20th)	Body and Soul	Francis Lyon and Robert Parrish
1947 (20th)	The Bishop's Wife	Monica Collingwood
1947 (20th)	Gentleman's Agreement	Harmon Jones
1947 (20th)	Green Dolphin Street	George White
1947 (20th)	Odd Man Out	Fergus McDonell
1948 (21st)	The Naked City	Paul Weatherwax
1948 (21st)	Joan of Arc	Frank Sullivan
1948 (21st)	Johnny Belinda	David Weisbart
1948 (21st)	Red River	Christian Nyby
1948 (21st)	The Red Shoes	Reginald Mills
1949 (22nd)	Champion	Harry W. Gerstad
1949 (22nd)	All the King's Men	Robert Parrish and Al Clark
1949 (22nd)	Battleground	John Dunning
1949 (22nd)	Sands of Iwo Jima	Richard L. Van Enger
1949 (22nd)	The Window	Frederic Knudtson

=== 1950s ===
Year	Film	Nominees
1950 (23rd)	King Solomon's Mines	Ralph E. Winters and Conrad A. Nervig
1950 (23rd)	All About Eve	Barbara McLean
1950 (23rd)	Annie Get Your Gun	James E. Newcom
1950 (23rd)	Sunset Boulevard	Arthur P. Schmidt and Doane Harrison
1950 (23rd)	The Third Man	Oswald Hafenrichter
1951 (24th)	A Place in the Sun	William Hornbeck
1951 (24th)	An American in Paris	Adrienne Fazan
1951 (24th)	Decision Before Dawn	Dorothy Spencer
1951 (24th)	Quo Vadis	Ralph E. Winters
1951 (24th)	The Well	Chester Schaeffer
1952 (25th)	High Noon	Elmo Williams and Harry W. Gerstad
1952 (25th)	Come Back, Little Sheba	Warren Low
1952 (25th)	Flat Top	William Austin
1952 (25th)	The Greatest Show on Earth	Anne Bauchens
1952 (25th)	Moulin Rouge	Ralph Kemplen
1953 (26th)	From Here to Eternity	William A. Lyon
1953 (26th)	Crazylegs	Irvine "Cotton" Warburton
1953 (26th)	The Moon Is Blue	Otto Ludwig
1953 (26th)	Roman Holiday	Robert Swink
1953 (26th)	The War of the Worlds	Everett Douglas
1954 (27th)	On the Waterfront	Gene Milford
1954 (27th)	20,000 Leagues Under the Sea	Elmo Williams
1954 (27th)	The Caine Mutiny	William A. Lyon and Henry Batista
1954 (27th)	The High and the Mighty	Ralph Dawson
1954 (27th)	Seven Brides for Seven Brothers	Ralph E. Winters
1955 (28th)	Picnic	Charles Nelson and William A. Lyon
1955 (28th)	Blackboard Jungle	Ferris Webster
1955 (28th)	The Bridges at Toko-Ri	Alma Macrorie
1955 (28th)	Oklahoma!	Gene Ruggiero and George Boemler
1955 (28th)	The Rose Tattoo	Warren Low
1956 (29th)	Around the World in 80 Days	Gene Ruggiero and Paul Weatherwax
1956 (29th)	The Brave One	Merrill G. White
1956 (29th)	Giant	William Hornbeck, Philip W. Anderson and Fred Bohanan
1956 (29th)	Somebody Up There Likes Me	Albert Akst
1956 (29th)	The Ten Commandments	Anne Bauchens
1957 (30th)	The Bridge on the River Kwai	Peter Taylor
1957 (30th)	Gunfight at the O.K. Corral	Warren Low
1957 (30th)	Pal Joey	Viola Lawrence and Jerome Thoms
1957 (30th)	Sayonara	Arthur P. Schmidt and Philip W. Anderson
1957 (30th)	Witness for the Prosecution	Daniel Mandell
1958 (31st)	Gigi	Adrienne Fazan
1958 (31st)	Auntie Mame	William H. Ziegler
1958 (31st)	Cowboy	William A. Lyon and Al Clark
1958 (31st)	The Defiant Ones	Frederic Knudtson
1958 (31st)	I Want to Live!	William Hornbeck
1959 (32nd)	Ben-Hur	Ralph E. Winters and John D. Dunning
1959 (32nd)	Anatomy of a Murder	Louis R. Loeffler
1959 (32nd)	North by Northwest	George Tomasini
1959 (32nd)	The Nun's Story	Walter Thompson
1959 (32nd)	On the Beach	Frederic Knudtson

=== 1960s ===
Year	Film	Nominees
1960 (33rd)	The Apartment	Daniel Mandell
1960 (33rd)	The Alamo	Stuart Gilmore
1960 (33rd)	Inherit the Wind	Frederic Knudtson
1960 (33rd)	Pepe	Viola Lawrence and Al Clark
1960 (33rd)	Spartacus	Robert Lawrence
1961 (34th)	West Side Story	Thomas Stanford
1961 (34th)	Fanny	William H. Reynolds
1961 (34th)	The Guns of Navarone	Alan Osbiston
1961 (34th)	Judgment at Nuremberg	Frederic Knudtson
1961 (34th)	The Parent Trap	Philip W. Anderson
1962 (35th)	Lawrence of Arabia	Anne V. Coates
1962 (35th)	The Longest Day	Samuel E. Beetley
1962 (35th)	The Manchurian Candidate	Ferris Webster
1962 (35th)	The Music Man	William H. Ziegler
1962 (35th)	Mutiny on the Bounty	John McSweeney Jr.
1963 (36th)	How the West Was Won	Harold F. Kress
1963 (36th)	The Cardinal	Louis R. Loeffler
1963 (36th)	Cleopatra	Dorothy Spencer
1963 (36th)	The Great Escape	Ferris Webster
1963 (36th)	It's a Mad, Mad, Mad, Mad World	Frederic Knudtson (posthumously), Robert C. Jones and Gene Fowler Jr.
1964 (37th)	Mary Poppins	Cotton Warburton
1964 (37th)	Becket	Anne V. Coates
1964 (37th)	Father Goose	Ted J. Kent
1964 (37th)	Hush...Hush, Sweet Charlotte	Michael Luciano
1964 (37th)	My Fair Lady	William H. Ziegler
1965 (38th)	The Sound of Music	William H. Reynolds
1965 (38th)	Cat Ballou	Charles Nelson
1965 (38th)	Doctor Zhivago	Norman Savage
1965 (38th)	The Flight of the Phoenix	Michael Luciano
1965 (38th)	The Great Race	Ralph E. Winters
1966 (39th)	Grand Prix	Fredric Steinkamp, Henry Berman, Stewart Linder and Frank Santillo
1966 (39th)	Fantastic Voyage	William B. Murphy
1966 (39th)	The Russians Are Coming, the Russians Are Coming	Hal Ashby and J. Terry Williams
1966 (39th)	The Sand Pebbles	William H. Reynolds
1966 (39th)	Who's Afraid of Virginia Woolf?	Sam O'Steen
1967 (40th)	In the Heat of the Night	Hal Ashby
1967 (40th)	Beach Red	Frank P. Keller
1967 (40th)	The Dirty Dozen	Michael Luciano
1967 (40th)	Doctor Dolittle	Samuel E. Beetley and Marjorie Fowler
1967 (40th)	Guess Who's Coming to Dinner	Robert C. Jones
1968 (41st)	Bullitt	Frank P. Keller
1968 (41st)	Funny Girl	Robert Swink, Maury Winetrobe and William Sands
1968 (41st)	The Odd Couple	Frank Bracht
1968 (41st)	Oliver!	Ralph Kemplen
1968 (41st)	Wild in the Streets	Fred R. Feitshans Jr. and Eve Newman
1969 (42nd)	Z	Françoise Bonnot
1969 (42nd)	Hello, Dolly!	William H. Reynolds
1969 (42nd)	Midnight Cowboy	Hugh A. Robertson
1969 (42nd)	The Secret of Santa Vittoria	William A. Lyon and Earle Herdan
1969 (42nd)	They Shoot Horses, Don't They?	Fredric Steinkamp

=== 1970s ===
Year	Film	Nominees
1970 (43rd)	Patton	Hugh S. Fowler
1970 (43rd)	Airport	Stuart Gilmore
1970 (43rd)	M*A*S*H	Danford B. Greene
1970 (43rd)	Tora! Tora! Tora!	James E. Newcom, Pembroke J. Herring and Inoue Chikaya
1970 (43rd)	Woodstock	Thelma Schoonmaker
1971 (44th)	The French Connection	Gerald B. Greenberg
1971 (44th)	The Andromeda Strain	Stuart Gilmore (posthumously) and John W. Holmes
1971 (44th)	A Clockwork Orange	Bill Butler
1971 (44th)	Kotch	Ralph E. Winters
1971 (44th)	Summer of '42	Folmar Blangsted
1972 (45th)	Cabaret	David Bretherton
1972 (45th)	Deliverance	Tom Priestley
1972 (45th)	The Godfather	William H. Reynolds and Peter Zinner
1972 (45th)	The Hot Rock	Frank P. Keller and Fred W. Berger
1972 (45th)	The Poseidon Adventure	Harold F. Kress
1973 (46th)	The Sting	William H. Reynolds
1973 (46th)	American Graffiti	Verna Fields and Marcia Lucas
1973 (46th)	The Day of the Jackal	Ralph Kemplen
1973 (46th)	The Exorcist	Jordan Leondopoulos, Bud S. Smith, Evan A. Lottman and Norman Gay
1973 (46th)	Jonathan Livingston Seagull	Frank P. Keller and James Galloway
1974 (47th)	The Towering Inferno	Harold F. Kress and Carl Kress
1974 (47th)	Blazing Saddles	John C. Howard and Danford B. Greene
1974 (47th)	Chinatown	Sam O'Steen
1974 (47th)	Earthquake	Dorothy Spencer
1974 (47th)	The Longest Yard	Michael Luciano
1975 (48th)	Jaws	Verna Fields
1975 (48th)	Dog Day Afternoon	Dede Allen
1975 (48th)	The Man Who Would Be King	Russell Lloyd
1975 (48th)	One Flew Over the Cuckoo's Nest	Richard Chew, Lynzee Klingman and Sheldon Kahn
1975 (48th)	Three Days of the Condor	Fredric Steinkamp and Don Guidice
1976 (49th)	Rocky	Richard Halsey and Scott Conrad
1976 (49th)	All the President's Men	Robert L. Wolfe
1976 (49th)	Bound for Glory	Robert C. Jones and Pembroke J. Herring
1976 (49th)	Network	Alan Heim
1976 (49th)	Two-Minute Warning	Eve Newman and Walter Hannemann
1977 (50th)	Star Wars	Paul Hirsch, Marcia Lucas and Richard Chew
1977 (50th)	Close Encounters of the Third Kind	Michael Kahn
1977 (50th)	Julia	Walter Murch
1977 (50th)	Smokey and the Bandit	Walter Hannemann and Angelo Ross
1977 (50th)	The Turning Point	William H. Reynolds
1978 (51st)	The Deer Hunter	Peter Zinner
1978 (51st)	The Boys from Brazil	Robert E. Swink
1978 (51st)	Coming Home	Don Zimmerman
1978 (51st)	Midnight Express	Gerry Hambling
1978 (51st)	Superman	Stuart Baird
1979 (52nd)	All That Jazz	Alan Heim
1979 (52nd)	Apocalypse Now	Richard Marks, Walter Murch, Gerald B. Greenberg and Lisa Fruchtman
1979 (52nd)	The Black Stallion	Robert Dalva
1979 (52nd)	Kramer vs. Kramer	Gerald B. Greenberg
1979 (52nd)	The Rose	Robert L. Wolfe and Carroll Timothy O'Meara

=== 1980s ===
Year	Film	Nominees
1980 (53rd)	Raging Bull	Thelma Schoonmaker
1980 (53rd)	Coal Miner's Daughter	Arthur Schmidt
1980 (53rd)	The Competition	David Blewitt
1980 (53rd)	The Elephant Man	Anne V. Coates
1980 (53rd)	Fame	Gerry Hambling
1981 (54th)	Raiders of the Lost Ark	Michael Kahn
1981 (54th)	Chariots of Fire	Terry Rawlings
1981 (54th)	The French Lieutenant's Woman	John Bloom
1981 (54th)	On Golden Pond	Robert L. Wolfe (posthumously)
1981 (54th)	Reds	Dede Allen and Craig McKay
1982 (55th)	Gandhi	John Bloom
1982 (55th)	Das Boot	Hannes Nikel
1982 (55th)	E.T. the Extra-Terrestrial	Carol Littleton
1982 (55th)	An Officer and a Gentleman	Peter Zinner
1982 (55th)	Tootsie	Fredric Steinkamp and William Steinkamp
1983 (56th)	The Right Stuff	Glenn Farr, Lisa Fruchtman, Stephen A. Rotter, Douglas Stewart and Tom Rolf
1983 (56th)	Blue Thunder	Frank Morriss and Edward M. Abroms
1983 (56th)	Flashdance	Bud S. Smith and Walt Mulconery
1983 (56th)	Silkwood	Sam O'Steen
1983 (56th)	Terms of Endearment	Richard Marks
1984 (57th)	The Killing Fields	Jim Clark
1984 (57th)	Amadeus	Nena Danevic and Michael Chandler
1984 (57th)	The Cotton Club	Barry Malkin and Robert Q. Lovett
1984 (57th)	A Passage to India	David Lean
1984 (57th)	Romancing the Stone	Donn Cambern and Frank Morriss
1985 (58th)	Witness	Thom Noble
1985 (58th)	A Chorus Line	John Bloom
1985 (58th)	Out of Africa	Fredric Steinkamp, William Steinkamp, Pembroke J. Herring and Sheldon Kahn
1985 (58th)	Prizzi's Honor	Rudi Fehr and Kaja Fehr
1985 (58th)	Runaway Train	Henry Richardson
1986 (59th)	Platoon	Claire Simpson
1986 (59th)	Aliens	Ray Lovejoy
1986 (59th)	Hannah and Her Sisters	Susan E. Morse
1986 (59th)	The Mission	Jim Clark
1986 (59th)	Top Gun	Billy Weber and Chris Lebenzon
1987 (60th)	The Last Emperor	Gabriella Cristiani
1987 (60th)	Broadcast News	Richard Marks
1987 (60th)	Empire of the Sun	Michael Kahn
1987 (60th)	Fatal Attraction	Michael Kahn and Peter E. Berger
1987 (60th)	RoboCop	Frank J. Urioste
1988 (61st)	Who Framed Roger Rabbit	Arthur Schmidt
1988 (61st)	Die Hard	Frank J. Urioste and John F. Link
1988 (61st)	Gorillas in the Mist	Stuart Baird
1988 (61st)	Mississippi Burning	Gerry Hambling
1988 (61st)	Rain Man	Stu Linder
1989 (62nd)	Born on the Fourth of July	David Brenner and Joe Hutshing
1989 (62nd)	The Bear	Noëlle Boisson
1989 (62nd)	Driving Miss Daisy	Mark Warner
1989 (62nd)	The Fabulous Baker Boys	William Steinkamp
1989 (62nd)	Glory	Steven Rosenblum

=== 1990s ===
Year	Film	Nominees
1990 (63rd)	Dances With Wolves	Neil Travis
1990 (63rd)	Ghost	Walter Murch
1990 (63rd)	The Godfather Part III	Barry Malkin, Lisa Fruchtman and Walter Murch
1990 (63rd)	Goodfellas	Thelma Schoonmaker
1990 (63rd)	The Hunt for Red October	Dennis Virkler and John Wright
1991 (64th)	JFK	Joe Hutshing and Pietro Scalia
1991 (64th)	The Commitments	Gerry Hambling
1991 (64th)	The Silence of the Lambs	Craig McKay
1991 (64th)	Terminator 2: Judgment Day	Conrad Buff, Mark Goldblatt and Richard A. Harris
1991 (64th)	Thelma & Louise	Thom Noble
1992 (65th)	Unforgiven	Joel Cox
1992 (65th)	Basic Instinct	Frank J. Urioste
1992 (65th)	The Crying Game	Kant Pan
1992 (65th)	A Few Good Men	Robert Leighton
1992 (65th)	The Player	Geraldine Peroni
1993 (66th)	Schindler's List	Michael Kahn
1993 (66th)	The Fugitive	Dennis Virkler, David Finfer, Dean Goodhill, Don Brochu, Richard Nord and Dov Hoenig
1993 (66th)	In the Line of Fire	Anne V. Coates
1993 (66th)	In the Name of the Father	Gerry Hambling
1993 (66th)	The Piano	Veronika Jenet
1994 (67th)	Forrest Gump	Arthur Schmidt
1994 (67th)	Hoop Dreams	Frederick Marx, Steve James and William Haugse
1994 (67th)	Pulp Fiction	Sally Menke
1994 (67th)	The Shawshank Redemption	Richard Francis-Bruce
1994 (67th)	Speed	John Wright
1995 (68th)	Apollo 13	Mike Hill and Daniel P. Hanley
1995 (68th)	Babe	Marcus D'Arcy and Jay Friedkin
1995 (68th)	Braveheart	Steven Rosenblum
1995 (68th)	Crimson Tide	Chris Lebenzon
1995 (68th)	Seven	Richard Francis-Bruce
1996 (69th)	The English Patient	Walter Murch
1996 (69th)	Evita	Gerry Hambling
1996 (69th)	Fargo	Roderick Jaynes
1996 (69th)	Jerry Maguire	Joe Hutshing
1996 (69th)	Shine	Pip Karmel
1997 (70th)	Titanic	Conrad Buff, James Cameron and Richard A. Harris
1997 (70th)	Air Force One	Richard Francis-Bruce
1997 (70th)	As Good as It Gets	Richard Marks
1997 (70th)	Good Will Hunting	Pietro Scalia
1997 (70th)	L.A. Confidential	Peter Honess
1998 (71st)	Saving Private Ryan	Michael Kahn
1998 (71st)	Life Is Beautiful	Simona Paggi
1998 (71st)	Out of Sight	Anne V. Coates
1998 (71st)	Shakespeare in Love	David Gamble
1998 (71st)	The Thin Red Line	Billy Weber, Leslie Jones and Saar Klein
1999 (72nd)	The Matrix	Zach Staenberg
1999 (72nd)	American Beauty	Tariq Anwar and Christopher Greenbury
1999 (72nd)	The Cider House Rules	Lisa Zeno Churgin
1999 (72nd)	The Insider	William Goldenberg, Paul Rubell and David Rosenbloom
1999 (72nd)	The Sixth Sense	Andrew Mondshein

=== 2000s ===
Year	Film	Nominees
2000 (73rd)	Traffic	Stephen Mirrione
2000 (73rd)	Almost Famous	Joe Hutshing and Saar Klein
2000 (73rd)	Crouching Tiger, Hidden Dragon	Tim Squyres
2000 (73rd)	Gladiator	Pietro Scalia
2000 (73rd)	Wonder Boys	Dede Allen
2001 (74th)	Black Hawk Down	Pietro Scalia
2001 (74th)	A Beautiful Mind	Mike Hill and Daniel P. Hanley
2001 (74th)	The Lord of the Rings: The Fellowship of the Ring	John Gilbert
2001 (74th)	Memento	Dody Dorn
2001 (74th)	Moulin Rouge!	Jill Bilcock
2002 (75th)	Chicago	Martin Walsh
2002 (75th)	Gangs of New York	Thelma Schoonmaker
2002 (75th)	The Hours	Peter Boyle
2002 (75th)	The Lord of the Rings: The Two Towers	Michael Horton
2002 (75th)	The Pianist	Hervé de Luze
2003 (76th)	The Lord of the Rings: The Return of the King	Jamie Selkirk
2003 (76th)	City of God	Daniel Rezende
2003 (76th)	Cold Mountain	Walter Murch
2003 (76th)	Master and Commander: The Far Side of the World	Lee Smith
2003 (76th)	Seabiscuit	William Goldenberg
2004 (77th)	The Aviator	Thelma Schoonmaker
2004 (77th)	Collateral	Jim Miller and Paul Rubell
2004 (77th)	Finding Neverland	Matt Chessé
2004 (77th)	Million Dollar Baby	Joel Cox
2004 (77th)	Ray	Paul Hirsch
2005 (78th)	Crash	Hughes Winborne
2005 (78th)	Cinderella Man	Mike Hill and Dan Hanley
2005 (78th)	The Constant Gardener	Claire Simpson
2005 (78th)	Munich	Michael Kahn
2005 (78th)	Walk the Line	Michael McCusker
2006 (79th)	The Departed	Thelma Schoonmaker
2006 (79th)	Babel	Stephen Mirrione and Douglas Crise
2006 (79th)	Blood Diamond	Steven Rosenblum
2006 (79th)	Children of Men	Alfonso Cuarón and Alex Rodríguez
2006 (79th)	United 93	Clare Douglas, Christopher Rouse and Richard Pearson
2007 (80th)	The Bourne Ultimatum	Christopher Rouse
2007 (80th)	The Diving Bell and the Butterfly	Juliette Welfling
2007 (80th)	Into the Wild	Jay Cassidy
2007 (80th)	No Country for Old Men	Roderick Jaynes
2007 (80th)	There Will Be Blood	Dylan Tichenor
2008 (81st)	Slumdog Millionaire	Chris Dickens
2008 (81st)	The Curious Case of Benjamin Button	Kirk Baxter and Angus Wall
2008 (81st)	The Dark Knight	Lee Smith
2008 (81st)	Frost/Nixon	Mike Hill and Dan Hanley
2008 (81st)	Milk	Elliot Graham
2009 (82nd)	The Hurt Locker	Bob Murawski and Chris Innis
2009 (82nd)	Avatar	Stephen Rivkin, John Refoua, and James Cameron
2009 (82nd)	District 9	Julian Clarke
2009 (82nd)	Inglourious Basterds	Sally Menke
2009 (82nd)	Precious: Based on the Novel 'Push' by Sapphire	Joe Klotz

=== 2010s ===
Year	Film	Nominees
2010 (83rd)	The Social Network	Angus Wall and Kirk Baxter
2010 (83rd)	127 Hours	Jon Harris
2010 (83rd)	Black Swan	Andrew Weisblum
2010 (83rd)	The Fighter	Pamela Martin
2010 (83rd)	The King's Speech	Tariq Anwar
2011 (84th)	The Girl with the Dragon Tattoo	Kirk Baxter and Angus Wall
2011 (84th)	The Artist	Anne-Sophie Bion and Michel Hazanavicius
2011 (84th)	The Descendants	Kevin Tent
2011 (84th)	Hugo	Thelma Schoonmaker
2011 (84th)	Moneyball	Christopher Tellefsen
2012 (85th)	Argo	William Goldenberg
2012 (85th)	Life of Pi	Tim Squyres
2012 (85th)	Lincoln	Michael Kahn
2012 (85th)	Silver Linings Playbook	Jay Cassidy and Crispin Struthers
2012 (85th)	Zero Dark Thirty	Dylan Tichenor and William Goldenberg
2013 (86th)	Gravity	Alfonso Cuarón and Mark Sanger
2013 (86th)	12 Years a Slave	Joe Walker
2013 (86th)	American Hustle	Jay Cassidy, Crispin Struthers and Alan Baumgarten
2013 (86th)	Captain Phillips	Christopher Rouse
2013 (86th)	Dallas Buyers Club	John Mac McMurphy and Martin Pensa
2014 (87th)	Whiplash	Tom Cross
2014 (87th)	American Sniper	Joel Cox and Gary D. Roach
2014 (87th)	Boyhood	Sandra Adair
2014 (87th)	The Grand Budapest Hotel	Barney Pilling
2014 (87th)	The Imitation Game	William Goldenberg
2015 (88th)	Mad Max: Fury Road	Margaret Sixel
2015 (88th)	The Big Short	Hank Corwin
2015 (88th)	The Revenant	Stephen Mirrione
2015 (88th)	Spotlight	Tom McArdle
2015 (88th)	Star Wars: The Force Awakens	Maryann Brandon and Mary Jo Markey
2016 (89th)	Hacksaw Ridge	John Gilbert
2016 (89th)	Arrival	Joe Walker
2016 (89th)	Hell or High Water	Jake Roberts
2016 (89th)	La La Land	Tom Cross
2016 (89th)	Moonlight	Nat Sanders and Joi McMillon
2017 (90th)	Dunkirk	Lee Smith
2017 (90th)	Baby Driver	Paul Machliss and Jonathan Amos
2017 (90th)	I, Tonya	Tatiana S. Riegel
2017 (90th)	The Shape of Water	Sidney Wolinsky
2017 (90th)	Three Billboards Outside Ebbing, Missouri	Jon Gregory
2018 (91st)	Bohemian Rhapsody	John Ottman
2018 (91st)	BlacKkKlansman	Barry Alexander Brown
2018 (91st)	The Favourite	Yorgos Mavropsaridis
2018 (91st)	Green Book	Patrick J. Don Vito
2018 (91st)	Vice	Hank Corwin
2019 (92nd)	Ford v Ferrari	Michael McCusker and Andrew Buckland
2019 (92nd)	The Irishman	Thelma Schoonmaker
2019 (92nd)	Jojo Rabbit	Tom Eagles
2019 (92nd)	Joker	Jeff Groth
2019 (92nd)	Parasite	Yang Jin-mo

=== 2020s ===
Year	Film	Nominees
2020/21 (93rd)	Sound of Metal	Mikkel E. G. Nielsen
2020/21 (93rd)	The Father	Yorgos Lamprinos
2020/21 (93rd)	Nomadland	Chloé Zhao
2020/21 (93rd)	Promising Young Woman	Frédéric Thoraval
2020/21 (93rd)	The Trial of the Chicago 7	Alan Baumgarten
2021 (94th)	Dune	Joe Walker
2021 (94th)	Don't Look Up	Hank Corwin
2021 (94th)	King Richard	Pamela Martin
2021 (94th)	The Power of the Dog	Peter Sciberras
2021 (94th)	tick, tick... BOOM!	Myron Kerstein and Andrew Weisblum
2022 (95th)	Everything Everywhere All at Once	Paul Rogers
2022 (95th)	The Banshees of Inisherin	Mikkel E. G. Nielsen
2022 (95th)	Elvis	Matt Villa and Jonathan Redmond
2022 (95th)	Tár	Monika Willi
2022 (95th)	Top Gun: Maverick	Eddie Hamilton
2023 (96th)	Oppenheimer	Jennifer Lame
2023 (96th)	Anatomy of a Fall	Laurent Sénéchal
2023 (96th)	The Holdovers	Kevin Tent
2023 (96th)	Killers of the Flower Moon	Thelma Schoonmaker
2023 (96th)	Poor Things	Yorgos Mavropsaridis
2024 (97th)	Anora	Sean Baker
2024 (97th)	The Brutalist	Dávid Jancsó
2024 (97th)	Conclave	Nick Emerson
2024 (97th)	Emilia Pérez	Juliette Welfling
2024 (97th)	Wicked	Myron Kerstein
2025 (98th)	One Battle After Another	Andy Jurgensen
2025 (98th)	F1	Stephen Mirrione
2025 (98th)	Marty Supreme	Ronald Bronstein and Josh Safdie
2025 (98th)	Sentimental Value	Olivier Bugge Coutté
2025 (98th)	Sinners	Michael P. Shawver

== Shortlisted finalists ==
Finalists for Best Film Editing were selected by branch members, who voted for ten finalists which were screened to determine the five nominees.

Year	Finalists	Ref
1965	The Agony and the Ecstasy, The Greatest Story Ever Told, The Hallelujah Trail, Ship of Fools, Those Magnificent Men in Their Flying Machines	
1966	The Blue Max, The Fortune Cookie, Hawaii, A Man for All Seasons, The Professionals	
1967	Bonnie and Clyde, Camelot, The Graduate, Sofi, Thoroughly Modern Millie	
1968	The Fixer, The Lion in Winter, Rachel, Rachel, Star!, The Thomas Crown Affair	
1969	Anne of the Thousand Days, Butch Cassidy and the Sundance Kid, Cactus Flower, Gaily, Gaily, Marooned	
1970	Catch-22, Five Easy Pieces, The Great White Hope, A Man Called Horse, Ryan's Daughter	
1971	Carnal Knowledge, Fiddler on the Roof, Mary, Queen of Scots, Nicholas and Alexandra, Sunday Bloody Sunday	
1972	Avanti!, Ben, Butterflies Are Free, Man of La Mancha, 1776	
1973	The Iceman Cometh, Jesus Christ Superstar, The Paper Chase, Paper Moon, Papillon	
1974	For Pete's Sake, The Front Page, The Godfather Part II, Hearts and Minds, The Taking of Pelham One Two Three	
1975	Funny Lady, The Hindenburg, The Other Side of the Mountain, Rollerball, The Sunshine Boys	
1976	King Kong, Midway, The Omen, The Seven-Per-Cent Solution, Silver Streak	
1977	Black Sunday, The Deep, The Goodbye Girl, Islands in the Stream, Saturday Night Fever	
1978	The Brink's Job, Foul Play, Grease, Heaven Can Wait, Hooper	
1979	The China Syndrome, The Electric Horseman, A Little Romance, Norma Rae, 10	

== Multiple wins and nominations ==
The following editors have received multiple nominations for the Academy Award for Best Film Editing. This list is sorted by the number of total awards won (with the number of total nominations listed in parentheses).

- 3: Thelma Schoonmaker (9)
- 3: Michael Kahn (8)
- 3: Daniel Mandell (5)
- 3: Ralph Dawson (4)
- 2: William H. Reynolds (7)
- 2: Harold F. Kress (6)
- 2: William A. Lyon (6)
- 2: Joe Hutshing (4)
- 2: Pietro Scalia (4)
- 2: Kirk Baxter (3)
- 2: Gene Milford (3)
- 2: Conrad A. Nervig (3)
- 2: Arthur Schmidt (3)
- 2: Angus Wall (3)
- 2: Harry W. Gerstad (2)
- 2: Paul Weatherwax (2)
- 1: Barbara McLean (7)
- 1: Walter Murch (6)
- 1: Anne V. Coates (5)
- 1: William Goldenberg (5)
- 1: Fredric Steinkamp (5)
- 1: Ralph E. Winters (5)
- 1: Anne Bauchens (4)
- 1: Daniel P. Hanley (4)
- 1: Mike Hill (4)
- 1: William Hornbeck (4)
- 1: Frank P. Keller (4)
- 1: Stephen Mirrione (4)
- 1: James E. Newcom (4)
- 1: George Amy (3)
- 1: John Bloom (3)
- 1: Joel Cox (3)
- 1: Lisa Fruchtman (3)
- 1: Gerald B. Greenberg (3)
- 1: Gene Havlick (3)
- 1: Hal C. Kern (3)
- 1: Charles Nelson (3)
- 1: Christopher Rouse (3)
- 1: Lee Smith (3)
- 1: Joe Walker (3)
- 1: Peter Zinner (3)
- 1: Hal Ashby (2)
- 1: Conrad Buff (2)
- 1: James Cameron (2)
- 1: Richard Chew (2)
- 1: Jim Clark (2)
- 1: Tom Cross (2)
- 1: Alfonso Cuarón (2)
- 1: Adrienne Fazan (2)
- 1: Verna Fields (2)
- 1: John Gilbert (2)
- 1: Richard A. Harris (2)
- 1: Alan Heim (2)
- 1: Paul Hirsch (2)
- 1: Robert J. Kern (2)
- 1: Marcia Lucas (2)
- 1: Michael McCusker (2)
- 1: Mikkel E. G. Nielsen (2)
- 1: Thom Noble (2)
- 1: Robert Parrish (2)
- 1: Gene Ruggiero (2)
- 1: Claire Simpson (2)
- 1: Cotton Warburton (2)
- 1: Elmo Williams (2)
- 0: Gerry Hambling (6)
- 0: Frederic Knudtson (6)
- 0: Al Clark (5)
- 0: Warren Low (4)
- 0: Michael Luciano (4)
- 0: Richard Marks (4)
- 0: Dorothy Spencer (4)
- 0: Dede Allen (3)
- 0: Philip W. Anderson (3)
- 0: Jay Cassidy (3)
- 0: Hank Corwin (3)
- 0: Richard Francis-Bruce (3)
- 0: Stuart Gilmore (3)
- 0: Doane Harrison (3)
- 0: Pembroke J. Herring (3)
- 0: Robert C. Jones (3)
- 0: Ralph Kemplen (3)
- 0: Sam O'Steen (3)
- 0: Steven Rosenblum (3)
- 0: William Steinkamp (3)
- 0: Frank J. Urioste (3)
- 0: Ferris Webster (3)
- 0: Robert L. Wolfe (3)
- 0: William H. Ziegler (3)
- 0: Tariq Anwar (2)
- 0: Stuart Baird (2)
- 0: Alan Baumgarten (2)
- 0: Samuel E. Beetley (2)
- 0: Danford B. Greene (2)
- 0: Walter Hannemann (2)
- 0: Roderick Jaynes (2)
- 0: Sheldon Kahn (2)
- 0: Myron Kerstein (2)
- 0: Saar Klein (2)
- 0: Viola Lawrence (2)
- 0: Chris Lebenzon (2)
- 0: Louis R. Loeffler (2)
- 0: Barry Malkin (2)
- 0: Owen Marks (2)
- 0: Pamela Martin (2)
- 0: Yorgos Mavropsaridis (2)
- 0: Craig McKay (2)
- 0: Sally Menke (2)
- 0: Otto Meyer (2)
- 0: Frank Morriss (2)
- 0: Eve Newman (2)
- 0: Paul Rubell (2)
- 0: Arthur P. Schmidt (2)
- 0: Bud S. Smith (2)
- 0: Tim Squyres (2)
- 0: Crispin Struthers (2)
- 0: Robert Swink (2)
- 0: Kevin Tent (2)
- 0: Walter A. Thompson (2)
- 0: Dylan Tichenor (2)
- 0: Sherman Todd (2)
- 0: Dennis Virkler (2)
- 0: Billy Weber (2)
- 0: Andrew Weisblum (2)
- 0: Juliette Welfling (2)
- 0: John Wright (2)

== See also ==
- BAFTA Award for Best Editing
- Independent Spirit Award for Best Editing
- Critics' Choice Movie Award for Best Editing
- American Cinema Editors Award for Best Edited Feature Film – Dramatic
- American Cinema Editors Award for Best Edited Feature Film – Comedy or Musical
- List of Academy Award–nominated films
