= Tom McArdle =

American film editor

- Occupation: Film Editor
- Years active: 1992–present

Tom McArdle is an American film editor. He is best known for editing the film Spotlight (2015), which earned a nomination for the Academy Award for Best Film Editing at the 88th Academy Awards and also won the Independent Spirit Award for Best Editing.

McArdle edited 7 films written and directed by Tom McCarthy, including The Station Agent (2003), The Visitor (2007), Win Win (2011) and Stillwater (2021).

Other notable films McArdle has edited include Marshall (2017), In a World... (2013) and Timmy Failure: Mistakes Were Made (2020). He joined the Academy of Motion Picture Arts and Sciences in 2016. A graduate of Dartmouth College, McArdle grew up in Garden City, New York. In 1987, McArdle was ranked 4th among US high-schoolers in the 3200 meter run with a time of 8:55.2. He currently holds the Nassau County (Section 8) indoor record for the 3200 meter run with a time of 9:02.5 from 1987.

== Filmography ==
=== As an editor ===
- The Saviors (2026)
- Maggie Moore(s) (2023)
- Stillwater (2021)
- Timmy Failure: Mistakes Were Made (2020)
- What They Had (2018)
- Marshall (2017)
- Spotlight (2015)
- The Cobbler (2014)
- God's Pocket (2014)
- In a World... (2013)
- Hello I Must Be Going (2012)
- Win Win (2011)
- Tenure (2008)
- Middle of Nowhere (2008)
- Heckler (2007) (Documentary)
- The Visitor (2007)
- The Architect (2006)
- Nadine in Date Land (2005) (TV Movie)
- Duane Hopwood (2005)
- Killer Diller (2004)
- Boys on the Run (2003)
- The Killing Zone (2003)
- The Station Agent (2003)
- Lone Hero (2002)
- Whipped (2000)
- Poor White Trash (2000)
- Loving Jezebel (1999)
- QM, I Think I Call Her QM (1999) (Short)
- Nazis: The Occult Conspiracy (1998) (Documentary)
- Hi-Life (1998)
- Paranoia (1998)
- A Hole in the Head (1998) (Documentary)
- Better Than Ever (1997)
- Talk to Me (1997)
- Star Maps (1997)
- Twisted (1996)
- Sandman (Short) (1995)
- The Keeper (1995)
- Hand Gun (1994)
- The Occult History of the Third Reich (Video Documentary) (1992)
- Laws of Gravity (1992)

=== Other credits ===
- 2005: The Quiet (additional editor)
- 2003: The Killing Zone (associate producer)
- 2002: The Skateboard Show (TV Movie) (additional editor)

== Accolades ==
Year	Award	Category	Type	Nominated work
2016	Academy Awards	Best Film Editing	Nominated	Spotlight
2016	Alliance of Women Film Journalists	Best Film Editing	Nominated	Spotlight
2016	Critics' Choice Awards	Best Editing	Nominated	Spotlight
2016	Central Ohio Film Critics Association	Best Editing	Nominated	Spotlight
2016	Gold Derby Awards	Best Editing	Nominated	Spotlight
2016	Independent Spirit Awards	Best Editing	Won	Spotlight
2016	HPA Award	Best Editing	Nominated	Spotlight
2016	Online Film & Television Association	Best Film Editing	Nominated	Spotlight
2015	Awards Circuit Community Awards	Best Film Editing	Runner-up	Spotlight
2015	Boston Society of Film Critics	Best Film Editing	Runner-up	Spotlight
2015	Indiewire Critics Poll Award	Best Editing	3rd place	Spotlight
2015	Phoenix Film Critics Society	Best Film Editing	Nominated	Spotlight
2015	St. Louis Gateway Film Critics Association	Best Editing	Nominated	Spotlight
2015	Chicago Film Critics Association	Best Editing	Nominated	Spotlight
1998	Williamsburg Brooklyn Film Festival	Best Editing	Won	Paranoia

== See also ==
- List of film director and editor collaborations
