= Eric Warren Singer =

American screenwriter

- Born: United States
- Occupation: Screenwriter
- Years active: 1995–present

Eric Warren Singer is an American screenwriter.

== Career ==
Singer and fellow screenwriter, David O. Russell, were nominated for an Academy Award for Best Original Screenplay for the 2013 film American Hustle, but lost to Spike Jonze for Her. For his work on Top Gun: Maverick (2022), Singer was nominated for the Academy Award for Best Adapted Screenplay.

Sony Pictures Entertainment bought Marita, a pitch from Singer, which would star Jennifer Lawrence.

== Filmography ==
- The International (2009)
- American Hustle (2013)
- Only the Brave (2017)
- Top Gun: Maverick (2022)
- Now You See Me: Now You Don't (2025) (as story writer)
- Miami Vice '85 (2028)
