= Dylan Tichenor =

American film editor

- Born: 1968 (age 57–58); United States
- Education: Greene Street Friends School; Central High School
- Occupation: Film editor
- Years active: 1991–present

Dylan Tichenor, A.C.E. (born 1968) is an American film editor. He is the recipient of several accolades, including a Critics' Choice Movie Award, a Hollywood Film Award and a Satellite Award, and has been nominated for a Primetime Emmy Award, two Academy Awards, two BAFTA Awards and four Eddie Awards.

== Early life and education ==
Tichenor grew up watching films with his father. He graduated from Philadelphia's Greene Street Friends School in 1982 and Central High School in 1986.

== Career ==
Tichenor worked as Geraldine Peroni's assistant on several films, including The Player. His first credit as an editor was for Altman's Jazz '34. He collaborated with Paul Thomas Anderson on many of the director's films. Tichenor stepped in to finish his mentor's editing of Brokeback Mountain. He was nominated for the Satellite Award for Boogie Nights and the Academy Award for Best Film Editing for There Will Be Blood. He is elected to membership in the American Cinema Editors.

== Filmography ==
Tichenor is the primary editor on each film, unless noted otherwise.

- The Player (Robert Altman - 1992) (apprentice editor)
- Short Cuts (Robert Altman - 1993) (assistant editor)
- Prêt-à-Porter (Robert Altman - 1994) (assistant editor)
- Mrs. Parker and the Vicious Circle (Alan Rudolph - 1994) (associate editor)
- Jazz '34 (Robert Altman - 1996) (with Brent Carpenter)
- Hard Eight (Paul Thomas Anderson - 1996) (post-production coordinator)
- Boogie Nights (Paul Thomas Anderson - 1997)
- Hurlyburly (Anthony Drazan - 1998)
- Magnolia (Paul Thomas Anderson - 1999) (also associate producer)
- Unbreakable (M. Night Shyamalan - 2000)
- The Royal Tenenbaums (Wes Anderson - 2001)
- Cold Creek Manor (Mike Figgis - 2003)
- Lemony Snicket's A Series of Unfortunate Events (Brad Silberling - 2004) (additional editor)
- Brokeback Mountain (Ang Lee - 2005) (with Geraldine Peroni, who died during production)
- There Will Be Blood (Paul Thomas Anderson - 2007)
- The Assassination of Jesse James by the Coward Robert Ford (Andrew Dominik - 2007)
- Doubt (John Patrick Shanley - 2008)
- Whip It (Drew Barrymore - 2009)
- The Town (Ben Affleck - 2010)
- Zero Dark Thirty (Kathryn Bigelow - 2012) (with William Goldenberg)
- Child 44 (Daniel Espinosa - 2015)
- Phantom Thread (Paul Thomas Anderson - 2017)
- Eternals (Chloé Zhao - 2021)
- Antlers (Scott Cooper - 2021)
- The Pale Blue Eye (Scott Cooper - 2022)

== Awards and nominations ==
=== Academy Awards ===
- There Will Be Blood (2007), nominated
- Zero Dark Thirty (2012), nominated

=== Eddie Awards ===
- The Royal Tenenbaums (2001), nominated
- Brokeback Mountain (2005), nominated
- There Will Be Blood (2007), nominated

=== BAFTA Awards ===
- Brokeback Mountain (2005), nominated

=== Emmy Awards ===
- Jazz '34 (1996), nominated

=== MTV Video Music Awards ===
- Save Me by Aimee Mann (2000) (music video), won

=== Online Film Critics Society Awards ===
- There Will Be Blood (2007), nominated

=== Satellite Awards ===
- Boogie Nights (1997), nominated
- Lemony Snicket's A Series of Unfortunate Events (2004), nominated
- Brokeback Mountain (2005), won

== See also ==
- List of film director and editor collaborations
