= Jonathan Amos =

British film editor

Jonathan Amos is an English film and television editor.

== Career ==
Amos has worked on TV series such as Spooks and Party Animals, New Street Law and feature films Scott Pilgrim vs. the World (2010), 20,000 Days on Earth (2014), Paddington 2 (2017), and Baby Driver (2017). He has won the BAFTA Award for Best Editing and was also nominated for an Academy Award for Best Film Editing. He was a co-editor on the 2018 film The Sisters Brothers.
