= Crispin Struthers =

American film editor

- Occupation: film editor
- Years active: 1999-present

Crispin Struthers is a two-time Oscar-nominated film editor. His first nomination was at the 85th Academy Awards for the film Silver Linings Playbook. Struthers and his fellow film editors are nominated for an Academy Award for Best Film Editing for the 2013 film American Hustle.
