= American Hustle =

2013 film directed by David O. Russell

- Theatrical release poster
- Directed by: David O. Russell
- Written by: Eric Warren Singer; David O. Russell
- Produced by: Charles Roven; Richard Suckle; Megan Ellison; Jonathan Gordon
- Starring: Christian Bale; Bradley Cooper; Amy Adams; Jeremy Renner; Jennifer Lawrence; Louis C.K.; Michael Peña; Alessandro Nivola
- Cinematography: Linus Sandgren
- Edited by: Jay Cassidy; Crispin Struthers; Alan Baumgarten
- Music by: Danny Elfman
- Production companies: Columbia Pictures; Atlas Entertainment; Annapurna Pictures
- Distributed by: Sony Pictures Releasing (Select territories); Panorama Media (International)
- Release dates: December 8, 2013 (Ziegfeld Theatre); December 13, 2013 (United States)
- Running time: 138 minutes
- Country: United States
- Language: English
- Budget: $40 million
- Box office: $251 million

American Hustle is a 2013 American black comedy crime film directed by David O. Russell. It was written by Eric Warren Singer and Russell and inspired by the FBI Abscam operation of the late 1970s and early 1980s. It stars Christian Bale and Amy Adams as two con artists forced by an FBI agent (Bradley Cooper) to set up an elaborate sting operation on corrupt politicians, including the mayor of Camden, New Jersey (Jeremy Renner). Jennifer Lawrence plays the unpredictable wife of Bale's character. Principal photography took place from March to May 2013 in Boston and Worcester, Massachusetts, as well as New York City.

American Hustle was released nationwide in the United States on December 13, 2013. The film opened to critical acclaim on release, with praise for its screenplay and the performances of the ensemble cast. It emerged as a major commercial success at the box office, grossing $251 million worldwide on a budget of $40 million.

American Hustle received a leading ten nominations at the 86th Academy Awards, including Best Picture, Best Director (for Russell), Best Actor (for Bale), Best Actress (for Adams), Best Supporting Actor (for Cooper), and Best Supporting Actress (for Lawrence), but failed to win any. At the 67th British Academy Film Awards, the film received ten nominations and won three, including Best Actress in a Supporting Role (for Lawrence). The ensemble cast won Outstanding Performance by a Cast in a Motion Picture at the 20th Screen Actors Guild Awards, with Lawrence receiving an additional nomination for Outstanding Performance by a Female Actor in a Supporting Role.

== Plot ==
In 1978, Irving Rosenfeld and Sydney Prosser work together as con artists. Sydney, posing as English aristocrat "Lady Edith Greensly", has improved the scams. Irving loves Sydney but is unwilling to leave his unstable, histrionic wife Rosalyn, fearing that he will lose contact with adopted son Danny. Rosalyn has also threatened to report Irving to the police if he leaves her.

FBI agent Richie DiMaso catches Irving and Sydney in a loan scam but offers to release them if Irving can line up four additional arrests. Richie believes that Sydney is English but has proof that her aristocratic claim is fraudulent. She tells Irving that she will manipulate Richie, which distances her from Irving.

Irving's friend pretends to be a wealthy Arab sheikh looking for potential investments in America. An associate of Irving's suggests that the sheikh do business with Mayor Carmine Polito of Camden, New Jersey, who is trying to revitalize gambling in Atlantic City but has struggled to find investors. Carmine seems to have a genuine desire to help the area's economy and his constituents.

Richie devises a plan to make Mayor Polito the target of a sting operation despite the objections of Irving and of Richie's boss Stoddard Thorsen. Sydney helps Richie manipulate an FBI secretary to make an unauthorized wire transfer of $2 million. When Stoddard's boss Anthony Amado hears of the operation, he praises Richie's initiative, pressuring Stoddard to continue.

Carmine leaves the meeting when Richie presses him to accept that cash bribe. Irving convinces him the sheikh is legitimate, expressing his dislike of Richie, and they become friends. Richie arranges for Carmine to meet the sheikh, and without consulting the others, has Mexican-American FBI agent Paco Hernandez play the sheikh, which displeases Irving.

Carmine brings the sheikh to a casino party, explaining that mobsters are there and that it is a necessary part of doing business. Irving is surprised to hear that Mafia boss Victor Tellegio, right-hand man to Meyer Lansky, is present and wants to meet the sheikh. Tellegio explains that the sheikh needs to become an American citizen, and that Carmine will need to expedite the process. Tellegio also requires a $10 million wire transfer to prove the sheikh's legitimacy.

Richie confesses his strong attraction to Sydney but becomes confused and aggressive when she drops her British accent and admits to being from Albuquerque, New Mexico. Rosalyn starts an affair with mobster Pete Musane, whom she met at the party. She mentions her belief that Irving is working with the IRS, causing Pete to threaten Irving, who promises to prove that the sheikh's investment is real.

Irving confronts Rosalyn, who admits that she told Pete and agrees to keep quiet but wants a divorce. With Carmine's help, Richie and Irving videotape members of Congress receiving bribes. Richie assaults Stoddard in a fight over the money and soon convinces Amado that he needs the $10 million to get Tellegio, but he gets only $2 million. A meeting is arranged at the offices of Tellegio's lawyer Alfonse Simone, but Tellegio does not appear.

Irving visits Carmine and admits to the scam but says that he has a plan to help him. Carmine throws Irving out, and the loss of their friendship deeply upsets Irving. The federal agents inform Irving that their $2 million is missing and that they have received an anonymous offer to return the money in exchange for Irving and Sydney's immunity and a reduced sentence for Carmine.

As it turns out, Alfonse Simone, with whom Richie had arranged the wire transfer, was a con man working with Irving and Sydney. Amado accepts the deal, and Stoddard removes Richie from the case, which ends his career. The congressmen are prosecuted, and so is Carmine, who is sentenced to 18 months in prison. Irving and Sydney move in together and open a legitimate art gallery, while Rosalyn lives with Pete and shares custody of Danny with Irving.

== Cast ==
- Christian Bale as Irving Rosenfeld (based on Mel Weinberg)
- Bradley Cooper as Richie DiMaso
- Amy Adams as Sydney Prosser / Lady Edith Greensly (based on Evelyn Knight)
- Jeremy Renner as Mayor Carmine Polito (based on Angelo Errichetti)
- Jennifer Lawrence as Rosalyn Rosenfeld (based on Marie Weinberg)
- Louis C.K. as Stoddard Thorsen
- Jack Huston as Pete Musane
- Michael Peña as Paco Hernandez / Sheik Abdullah
- Shea Whigham as Carl Elway
- Alessandro Nivola as Anthony Amado
- Robert De Niro as Victor Tellegio (based on Vincent Alo; uncredited)
- Elisabeth Röhm as Dolly Polito
- Paul Herman as Alfonse Simone
- Saïd Taghmaoui as Irv's Sheik Plant
- Matthew Russell as Dominic Polito
- Thomas Matthews as Francis Polito
- Adrian Martinez as Julius
- Anthony Zerbe as Horton Mitchell
- Colleen Camp as Brenda
- Dawn Olivieri as Cosmo Girl
- Erica McDermott as Carl Elway's Assistant
- Jack Jones (Jazz Quartet Singer)

== Production ==
The film began as an Eric Warren Singer screenplay titled American Bullshit. It was listed at #8 on the 2010 Black List of most-liked unproduced screenplays. The production was set up at Columbia Pictures, with Charles Roven and Richard Suckle producing through Atlas Entertainment, which initially considered Ben Affleck to direct, before David O. Russell was ultimately signed. Russell rewrote Singer's screenplay, replacing the characters with caricatures of their respective real-life figures. Russell regarded Hustle, a highly fictionalized version of the Abscam scandal of the late 1970s and early 1980s, as the third in a loose trilogy of films about ordinary people trying to live passionate lives.

Principal photography started on March 8, 2013, and wrapped in May 2013. The film was shot in and around Boston, Massachusetts, as well as Worcester and in New York City. Filming was put on hold in the aftermath of the Boston Marathon bombings, with the city in lockdown. After lockdown was lifted, the film wrapped its Boston shoot and spent its final few days of production in New York City. The soundtrack, released by Madison Gate Records and Legacy Recordings on December 6, 2013, features a selection of popular music from the 1970s and 1980s.

== Release ==
Director David O. Russell released the teaser trailer for the film on July 31, 2013, and a theatrical trailer was released on October 9, 2013. The film received nationwide United States release on December 13, 2013.

=== Home media ===
American Hustle was released on DVD and Blu-ray on March 18, 2014. A 4K SteelBook 10th Anniversary was released on May 21, 2024.

== Reception ==
=== Box office ===
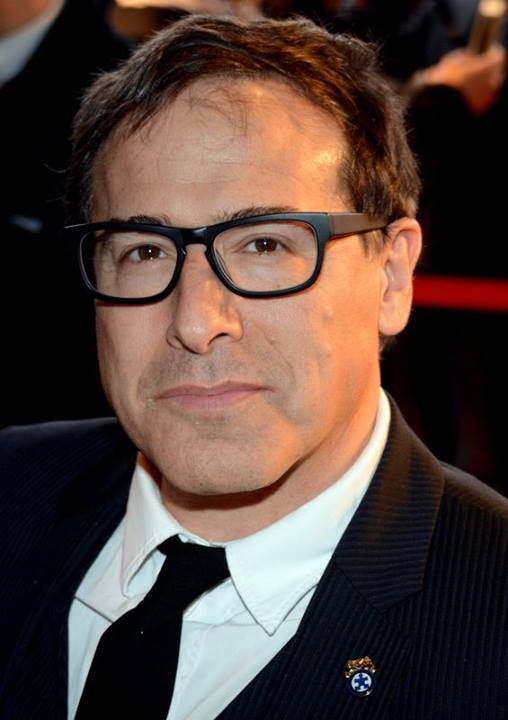
American Hustle is Russell's highest-grossing film

Variety estimated the production budget at $40 million. When producer Charles Roven was asked if the budget was in the $40 to $50 million area, he responded, "I'd say that's a good zone".

The film earned $150.1 million in North American and $101.1 million in international markets, for a worldwide total of $251.2 million. It made a net profit of $27 million when factoring all expenses and revenues for the film.

=== Critical response ===
American Hustle received critical acclaim, with high praise directed toward Bale's, Adams's, Cooper's and Lawrence's performances. Review aggregation website Rotten Tomatoes gives the film a 92% rating, based on 294 reviews, with an average score of 8.2/10. The website's critical consensus reads: "Riotously funny and impeccably cast, American Hustle compensates for its flaws with unbridled energy and some of David O. Russell's most irrepressibly vibrant direction." Metacritic gives a score of 90 out of 100, based on 47 critics, indicating "universal acclaim". Audiences polled by CinemaScore gave the film an average grade of "B+" on a scale of "A+" to "F".

Critic Christy Lemire awarded the film four stars out of four, praising David O. Russell's directing and the relationship between Irving and Sydney, as well as Jennifer Lawrence's portrayal of Rosalyn. She writes, "For all its brashness and big personality, American Hustle is a character study at its core—an exploration of dissatisfaction and drive, and the lengths to which we're willing to go for that elusive thing known as a better life."

Richard Roeper of the Chicago Sun-Times gave the film an A+, complimenting Bradley Cooper's performance and stating that American Hustle was "the best time I've had at the movies all year". He later named it the year's best film.

Time magazine's Richard Corliss wrote, "American Hustle is an urban eruption of flat-out fun—the sharpest, most exhilarating comedy in years. Anyone who says otherwise must be conning you."

Peter Debruge of Variety was critical of the film, calling it "a sloppy sprawl of a movie" and complaining that the improvisational performances overwhelm, instead of adding to a coherent plot. He also wrote that it "makes your brain hurt—and worse, overwhelms the already over-complicated Abscam re-telling at the center of the film".

=== Accolades ===
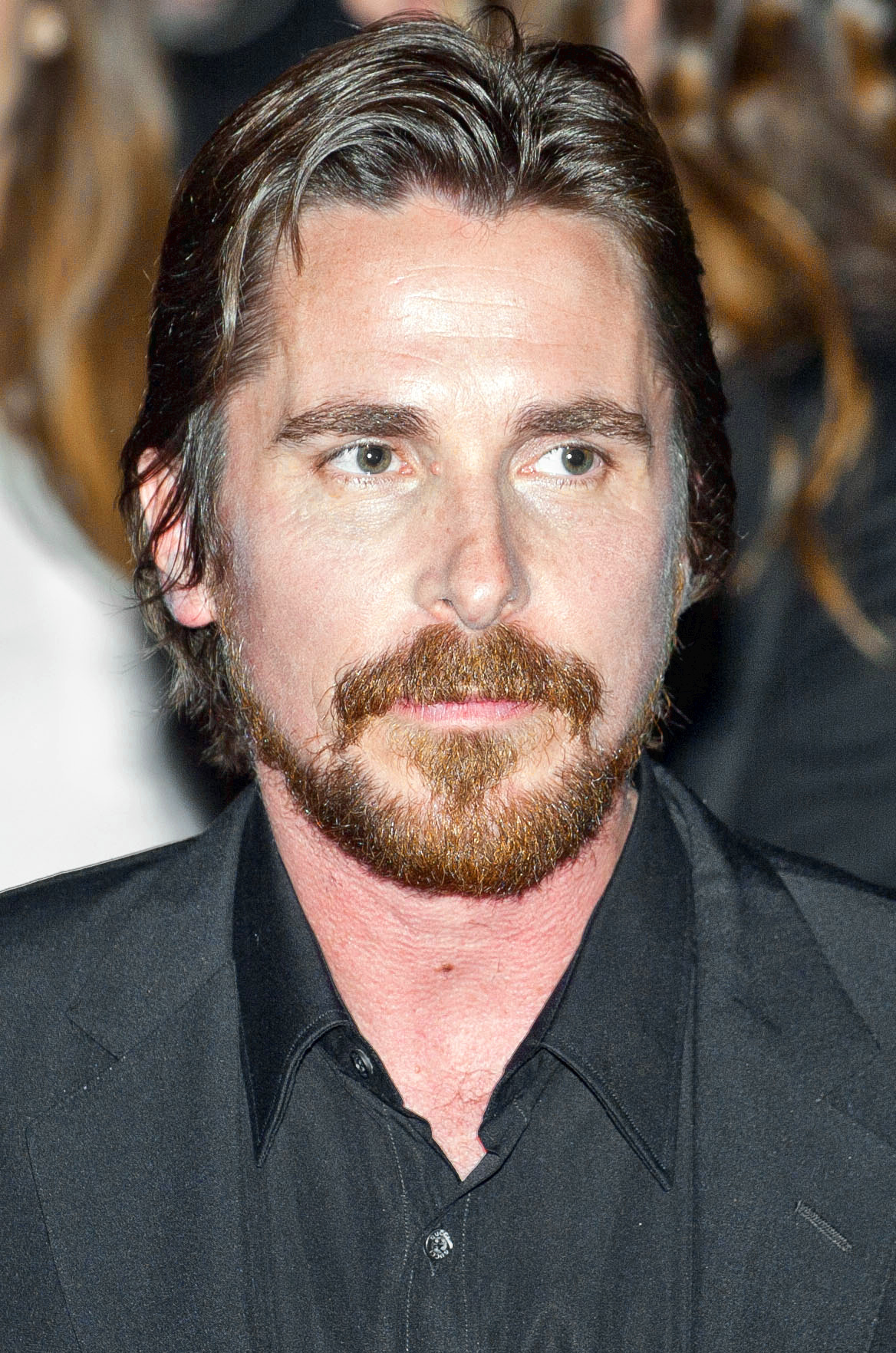

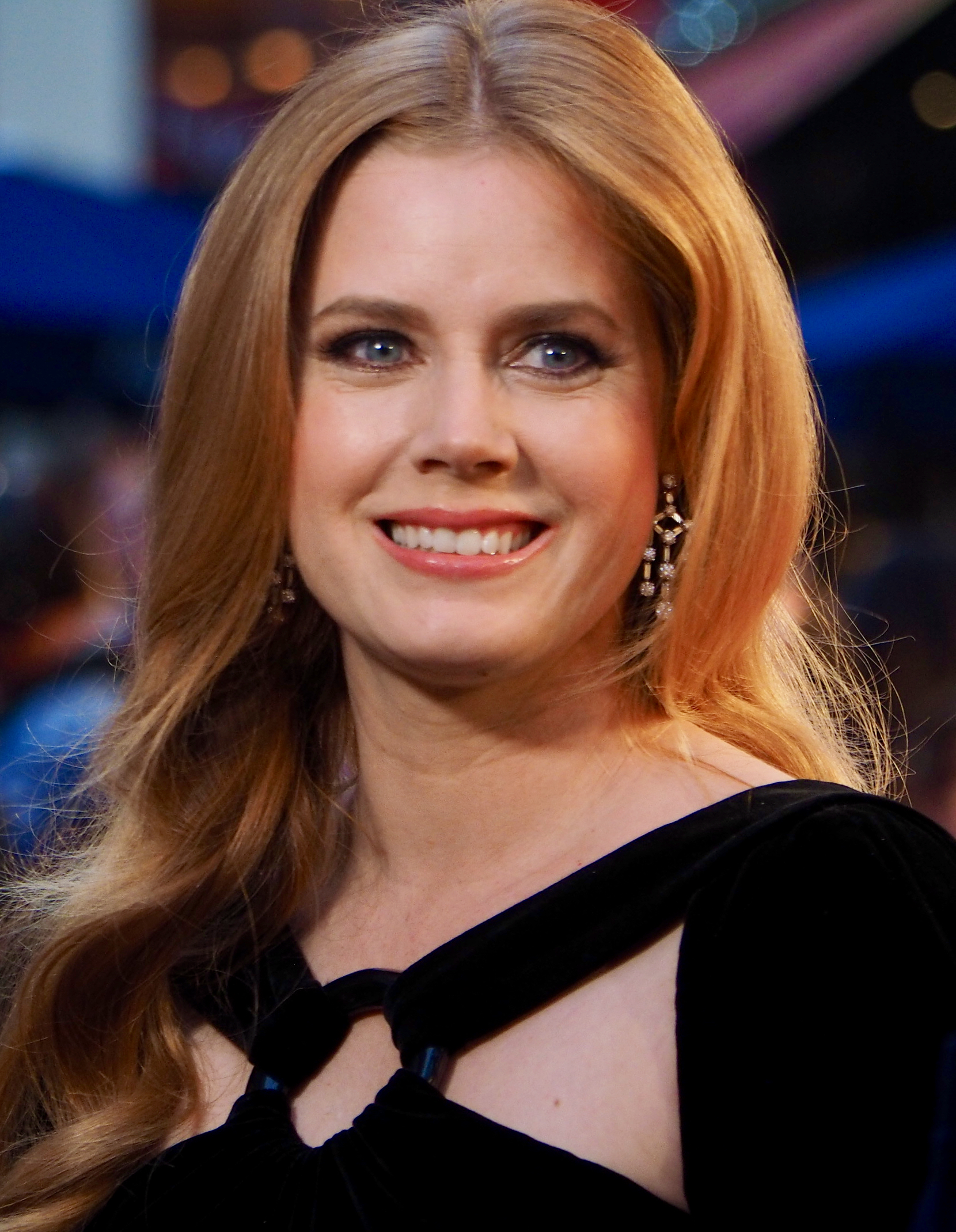

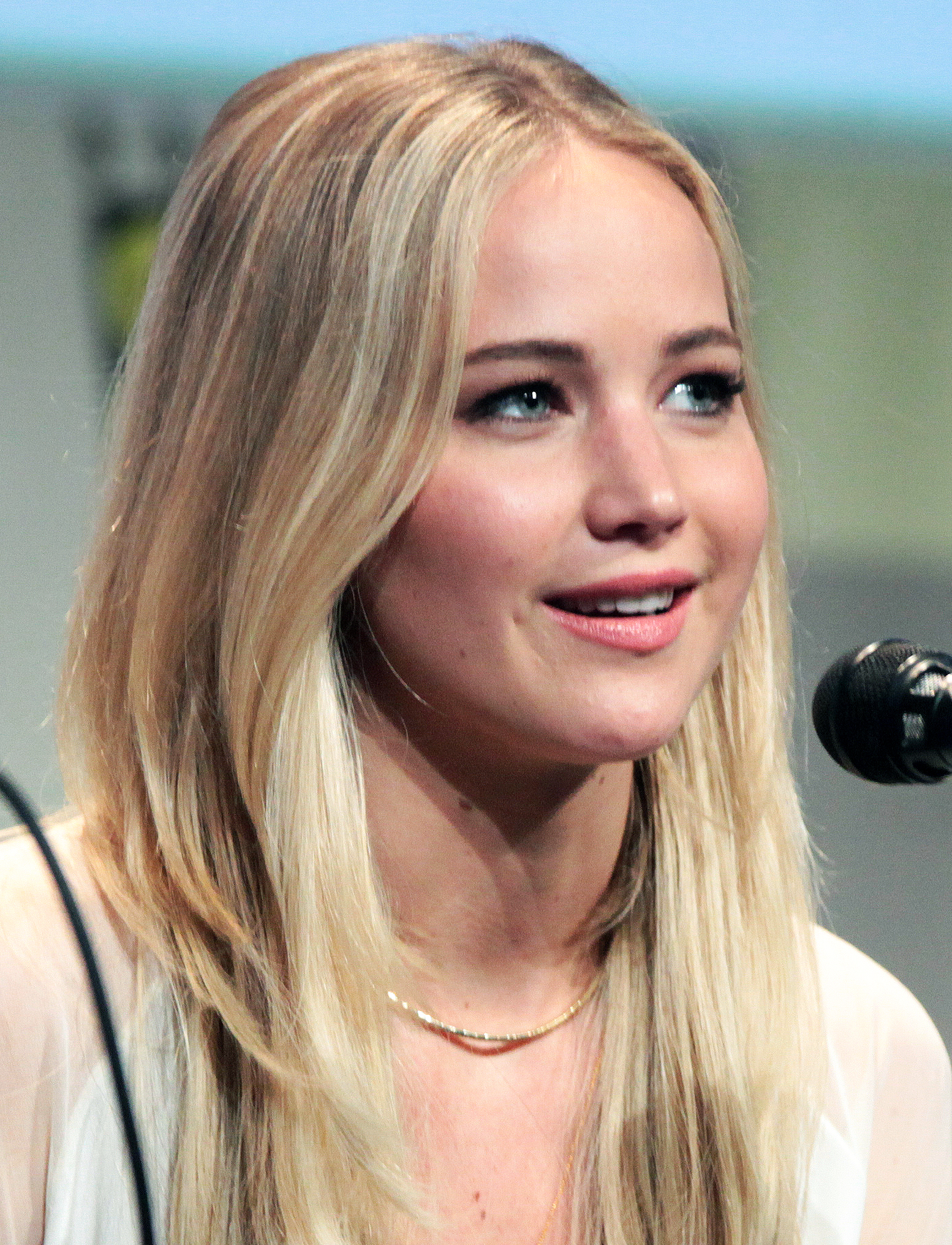

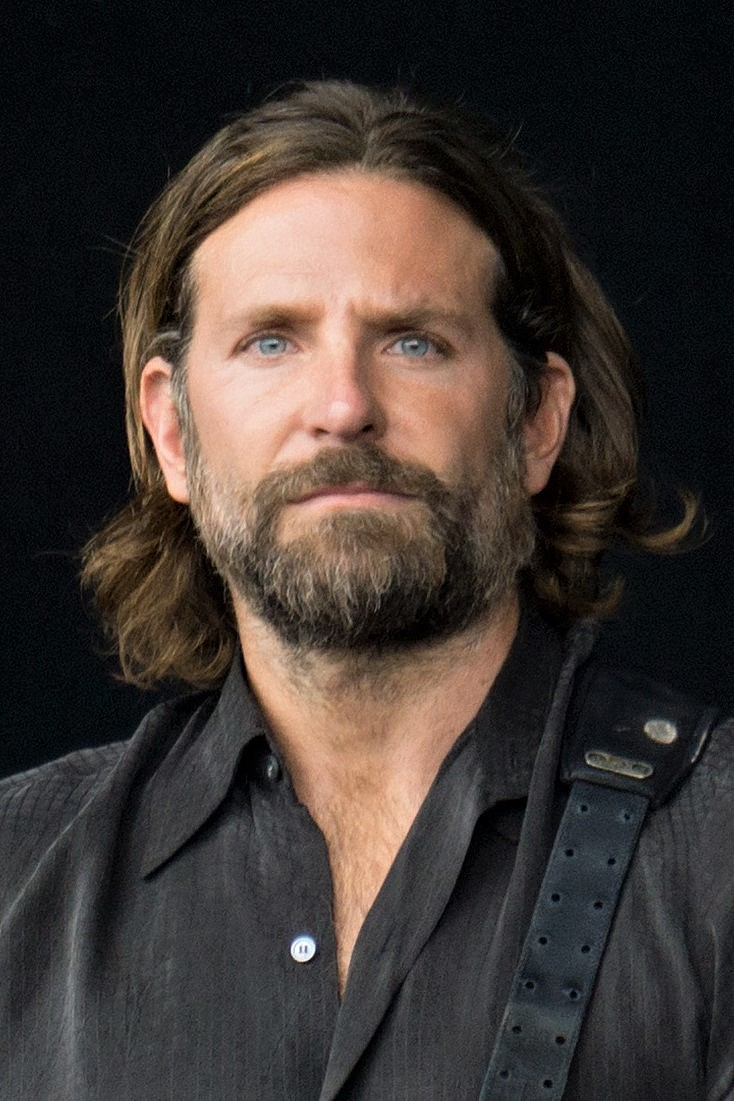

American Hustle received seven Golden Globe Award nominations; it won for Best Motion Picture – Musical or Comedy, with Amy Adams and Jennifer Lawrence winning Best Actress – Motion Picture Musical or Comedy and Best Supporting Actress – Motion Picture, respectively.

The film received ten Oscar nominations, including Best Picture, Best Director, Best Original Screenplay, and all four acting categories, but did not win in any category. The film received the second highest number of nominations for a film that did not win any Oscars, a distinction it shares with Gangs of New York, True Grit, The Irishman and Killers of the Flower Moon, after the 11 for The Turning Point and The Color Purple. It was the fifteenth film to be nominated in the four acting categories, and only the second since 1981, after Silver Linings Playbook, that Russell also directed. Of the fifteen films, it joins only My Man Godfrey and Sunset Boulevard to not win any acting awards.

The film took top honors at the 20th Screen Actors Guild Awards, winning for Outstanding Cast in a Motion Picture.

The film was nominated for ten British Academy Film Awards, with Jennifer Lawrence winning for Actress in a Supporting Role and David O. Russell and Eric Warren Singer winning for Best Original Screenplay.

== Lawsuit ==
In October 2014, science writer Paul Brodeur filed a defamation lawsuit against the producers and distributors of American Hustle, based on a line in the film in which Rosalyn tells Irving that microwave ovens take the nutrition out of food, stating that she read it in an article by Brodeur. In real life, Brodeur has written books, including The Zapping of America, about the dangers of microwave radiation, but he claims that he has never stated that the process removes a food's nutrition.

The defendants immediately filed a motion under California's anti-SLAPP statute to strike the complaint and award attorney fees, which the trial court initially denied. The decision was reversed by the California Court of Appeal, which held that the motion should have been granted because "the general tenor of American Hustle, the entirely farcical nature of the 'science oven' scene, and the ditzy nature of the character uttering the allegedly defamatory statement, all indicate that an audience would not expect anything Rosalyn says to reflect objective fact", and that, in view of this, Brodeur "failed to carry his burden of showing a probability of prevailing on his defamation claim".

== Historical accuracy ==
American Hustle is a dramatization of the FBI's Abscam sting operation in the late 1970s and early 1980s that led to convictions of, among others, seven members of the United States Congress. The film does not attempt to directly document the events of Abscam. The names are changed, and the film begins with the on-screen message, "Some of this actually happened". Major departures from reality include:

- In the film, Irving Rosenfeld begins a life of criminality when he smashes storefront windows as a child to provide more work for his father's glass-installation business. In real life, Melvin Weinberg began working for his father as an adult. He did smash windows, however, and according to one article after Abscam was revealed, it was indeed done to shore up business for Weinberg's father. A later report states that it was done at the behest of the local union to punish businesses which used non-union glaziers.
- In the film, Camden Mayor Carmine Polito is shown as a selfless politician who gets involved in the scam to provide jobs to his constituents. Irving feels so bad for Carmine that he engineers a reduced sentence for him. In reality, Camden mayor Angelo Errichetti had a reputation for committing crimes, despite being widely praised for caring about the people of Camden. During the Abscam operation, he offered to get the fake sheikh into illegal businesses, such as money counterfeiting and drug smuggling. Although Weinberg developed a fondness for Errichetti as a man who "didn't beat around the bush", he made no attempt to protect Errichetti from prosecution.
- Evelyn Knight, Weinberg's mistress on whom the character of Sydney Prosser is based, was involved in Weinberg's scams, although to a lesser extent than shown in the film, and she was not involved in Abscam. Also, she was English, not an American impersonating an English woman, as shown in the film.
- Weinberg's wife Cynthia Marie Weinberg, the basis for Rosalyn Rosenfeld, is not known to have had an affair with someone from the mafia, nor did she nearly blow Weinberg's cover. She was also of similar age to Melvin Weinberg, while the character of Rosalyn is portrayed as being significantly younger than her husband.
- The character of Richie DiMaso is based, to some extent, on federal agent Tony Amoroso, although, in real life, Amoroso was just one of a number of agents involved in setting up and executing the scam.
- In the film, the sheikh is impersonated by a Mexican-American FBI agent. In real life, the sheikh was played by two different agents: first, briefly by an Irish-American Mike Denehy who spoke no Arabic, then by a Lebanese-American.

== See also ==
- List of Big Five Academy Award winners and nominees
- List of films with all four Academy Award acting nominations
