= 2014 in animation =

2014 in animation is an overview of notable events, including notable awards, list of films released, television show debuts and endings, and notable deaths.

== Events ==
=== January ===
- January 12: The Simpsons episode "Married to the Blob" is first broadcast, in which the couch gag is animated by Bill Plympton, the third time he has done so. In the same episode, the long-time single Comic Book Guy marries manga artist Kumiko Nakamura.
- January 20: A standalone half-hour CG-animated special based on The Powerpuff Girls titled "Dance Pantsed" premiered on Cartoon Network.

=== February ===
- February 1: The 41st Annie Awards are held.
- February 7: The Lego Movie, by Phil Lord and Christopher Miller, is released.
- February 22: During the 86th Academy Awards, Frozen by Chris Buck, Jennifer Lee and Peter Del Vecho wins the Academy Award for Best Animated Feature. The song "Let It Go" from the same movie, written by Kristen Anderson-Lopez and Robert Lopez, wins the Academy Award for Best Original Song. Mr. Hublot by Laurent Witz and Alexandre Espigares wins the Academy Award for Best Animated Short Film.

=== March ===
- March 9: The Simpsons episode "Diggs" is first broadcast, in which the couch gag is animated by Sylvain Chomet. The same evening, another episode, "The Man Who Grew Too Much", is first broadcast, featuring the last new speaking appearance of Edna Krabappel after Marcia Wallace's death on October 25, 2013. The character was retired after this episode.
- March 24-25: The Scooby-Doo direct-to-video film Scooby-Doo! WrestleMania Mystery releases on DVD, Blu-ray, & UltraViolet.

=== April ===
- April 1: Cav Bøgelund's Våbenbrødre (Brothers in Arms), an animated short aimed at mature audiences about Danish soldiers during the Afghan War, premieres.
- April 27:
  - The Simpsons episode, "What to Expect When Bart's Expecting", is first broadcast, in which the couch gag is animated by Michael Socha.
  - Nickelodeon celebrates its 35th anniversary.

=== May ===
- May 4: The Simpsons' 550th episode "Brick Like Me" premieres on Fox, in which large parts of the episode are animated in the style of Lego.
- May 11: The Family Guy episode "He's Bla-ack!" premieres on Fox, which marks the return of Cleveland Brown (along with his current family) after the cancellation of his spin-off from the previous year.
- May 18:
  - Bob's Burgers concludes its fourth season on Fox with the episode "World Wharf II: The Wharfening (or How Bob Saves/Destroys the Town – Part II)". The season's finale was seen by over 1.9 million viewers that night.
  - American Dad! concludes its tenth season on Fox with the episode "The Longest Distance Relationship". The season's finale was seen by over 2.3 million viewers that night.
  - The Simpsons concludes its 25th season on Fox with the episode "The Yellow Badge of Cowardge", guest starring Olympian Edwin Moses. The season's finale was seen by over 3.2 million viewers that night.
  - Family Guy concludes its 12th season on Fox with the episode "Chap Stewie", which features the following English guest stars: Cary Elwes, Isaac Hempstead-Wright, Aaron Taylor-Johnson, and David Thewlis. The season's finale was seen by over 3.8 million viewers that night.

=== June ===
- June 5:
  - Teen Titans Go! concludes its first season on Cartoon Network with the episode "Puppets, Whaaaaat?".
  - Season 3 of The Amazing World of Gumball begins on Cartoon Network with the premiere of the episodes "The Kids/The Fan". Jacob Hopkins and Terrell Ransom Jr. replace Logan Grove and Kwesi Boakye as the voices of Gumball and Darwin due to the latter actors going through puberty.
- June 12: Season 2 of Teen Titans Go! begins on Cartoon Network with the premiere of the episode "Mr. Butt".
- June 13: Dreamworks Animation's How to Train Your Dragon 2 was released.
- June 16: Cartoon Network announced that a reboot of The Powerpuff Girls is currently in development, and will premiere in 2016.
- June 27: Season 3 of The Legend of Korra begins on Nickelodeon with the premiere of the episodes "A Breath of Fresh Air", "Rebirth", and "The Earth Queen". The season's premiere was seen by only 1.5 million viewers that night.
- Specific date unknown in June: In Belgium, Karolien Raeymaekers makes an animated short, Oma, about her deceased grandmother, as her final exam for the KASK film school in Ghent. The film would be posted on Cartoon Brew later that year and win several awards.

=== July ===
- July 25: Cartoon Network announces the following at this year's San Diego Comic-Con:
  - 7th Season renewals for Adventure Time & Regular Show.
  - Second season renewals for Uncle Grandpa & Steven Universe.
  - Clarence was renewed for 13 additional episodes.
- July 26: Phineas and Ferb: Star Wars premieres on Disney Channel. It brought in a total of over two million viewers that night.

=== August ===
- August 1: The second and final season of Gravity Falls begins on Disney Channel with the premiere of the episode "Scary-oke", episode premieres would soon switch over to Disney XD 3 days later.
- August 2: Paw Patrol concludes its first season on TVO in Canada with the episodes "Pups Save a Super Pup/Pups Save Ryder's Robot".
- August 5: The Scooby-Doo direct-to-video film Scooby-Doo! Frankencreepy releases on Digital services; later released on DVD & Blu-ray on August 19th.
- August 13: Season 2 of Paw Patrol begins on Nickelodeon in the US with the premiere of the episodes "Pups Save the Space Alien/Pups Save a Flying Frog".
- August 18: Paw Patrol concludes its first season on Nickelodeon in the US with the half-hour special "Pups and the Pirate Treasure".
- August 27: Season 2 of Paw Patrol begins on TVO in Canada with the following episodes:
  - "Pups Save the Penguins/Pups Save a Dolphin Pup"
  - "Pups Save Jake/Pups Save the Parade"
- August 22: BoJack Horseman premiered on Netflix.
  - The Legend of Korra concludes its third season on Nickelodeon with the episodes "Enter the Void" and "Venom of the Red Lotus".

=== September ===
- September 14: Season 11 of American Dad! begins on Fox with the premiere of the episodes, "Roger Passes the Bar" and "A Boy Named Michael". Both episodes were seen by over 2.6 million viewers that night.
- September 21: American Dad! concludes its 11th season on Fox with the episode "Blagsnarst, a Love Story". The season's finale was seen by over 3 million viewers that night. This was the final episode to air on Fox as the show would switch over to TBS next month for the premiere of its 12th season.
- September 24: Season 18 of South Park begins on Comedy Central with the premiere of the episode "Go Fund Yourself". It was seen by exactly 2.4 million viewers that night.
- September 25: The two-part Steven Universe episodes "Mirror Gem/Ocean Gem" premiere on Cartoon Network, which mark the debut of the beloved character Lapis Lazuli. The episode was seen by over 2.3 million viewers that night.
- September 26: Teenage Mutant Ninja Turtles concludes its second season on Nickelodeon with the two-part special "The Invasion". The season's finale was seen by only 1.63 million viewers, and received universal acclaim from fans and critics; who praised its great balance between the episode's lighthearted humor and darker fight scenes. IGN gave the episode a perfect score of 10, and was also given the "Editors' Choice" title from the same website.
- September 27: My Little Pony: Equestria Girls – Rainbow Rocks is released.
- September 28:
  - Fox replaces its Animation Domination block with a new block called Sunday Funday, which contained an hour of live-action shows and no longer fully had animated shows on its lineup, Animation Domination would return in 2019.
  - Season 26 of The Simpsons begins on Fox with the premiere of the episode "Clown in the Dumps", with the couch gag being animated by Don Hertzfeldt. It had been announced months earlier that a recurring character would die. This character's identity is revealed: Hyman Krustofsky, father of Krusty the Clown.
  - Season 13 of Family Guy begins on Fox with the premiere of the episode "The Simpsons Guy", which is crossover with The Simpsons.

=== October ===
- October 2: Alan Becker releases "Animator vs Animation IV" on YouTube.
- October 3: The fourth and final season of The Legend of Korra begins on Nickelodeon with the premiere of the episode "After All These Years".
  - Season 3 of Teenage Mutant Ninja Turtles begins on Nickelodeon with the premiere of the episode "Within the Woods". The season's premiere was seen by only 1.42 million viewers that night.
- October 5: Season 5 of Bob's Burgers begins on Fox with the premiere of the episode "Work Hard or Die Trying, Girl". The season's premiere was seen by over 3.1 million viewers that night.
- October 13: Hub Network is rebranded as Discovery Family; Hasbro remains a minority partner and programs the network's daytime lineup with children's animated programs carried over from Hub Network, while its primetime lineup was replaced with reruns of non-fiction programs from Discovery Channel's library.
- October 20: Season 12 of American Dad! begins on TBS with the premiere of the episode "Blonde Ambition". Starting with this season, the show begins airing on TBS after airing on Fox for its 11 previous seasons.
- October 30: The Amazing World of Gumball's 100th episode "The Man" premieres on Cartoon Network.

=== November ===
- November 7: Disney releases Big Hero 6.
- November 9: "Simpsorama", a crossover episode between The Simpsons and Futurama, is first broadcast.
- Specific date unknown in November: Three animated programs, Fat Albert and the Cosby Kids, Fatherhood, and Little Bill, are pulled from syndication due to actor Bill Cosby facing allegations of sexual assault. Little Bill is one of the programs to be regretted by Nickelodeon as books based on the show were ceased from circulation. Distractify responded "Perhaps Little Bill should be left in the past."

=== December ===
- December 4: Wander Over Yonder concludes its first season on Disney XD with the premiere of the episode "The Gift 2: The Giftening".
- December 10: South Park concludes its 18th season on Comedy Central with the episode "#HappyHolograms", this was the show's first Christmas-themed episode in 10 years since Season 8's "Woodland Critter Christmas".
- December 17: Luxo Jr. and Moon Breath Beat are added to the National Film Registry.
- December 19: The series finale of The Legend of Korra, "The Last Stand" premieres on Nickelodeon. The series' final shot, intended to show Asami and Korra becoming a romantic couple, was seen as pushing the boundaries of LGBT representation in children's television.
- December 25: Johnny Test airs its final episodes on Cartoon Network.

== Awards ==
- Academy Award for Best Animated Feature: Frozen
- Academy Award for Best Animated Short Film: Mr. Hublot
- Animation Kobe Feature Film Award: Puella Magi Madoka Magica: Rebellion
- Annecy International Animated Film Festival Cristal du long métrage: The Boy and the World
- Annie Award for Best Animated Feature: How to Train Your Dragon 2
- Asia Pacific Screen Award for Best Animated Feature Film: The Tale of the Princess Kaguya
- BAFTA Award for Best Animated Film: The Lego Movie
- César Award for Best Animated Film: Minuscule: Valley of the Lost Ants
- European Film Award for Best Animated Film: The Art of Happiness
- Golden Globe Award for Best Animated Feature Film: How to Train Your Dragon 2
- Goya Award for Best Animated Film: Mortadelo and Filemon: Mission Implausible
- Japan Academy Prize for Animation of the Year: The Wind Rises
- Japan Media Arts Festival Animation Grand Prize: The Wound
- Mainichi Film Awards - Animation Grand Award: Giovanni's Island

== Films released ==
- January 17 - The Nut Job (United States)
- March 7 - Mr Peabody and Sherman (United States)
- April 1 - Tinkerbell and the Pirate Fairy (United States)
- April 11 - Rio 2 (United States)
- June 13 - How To Train Your Dragon 2 (United States)
- September 2 - Tom and Jerry: The Lost Dragon (DVD)
- October 17 - The Book of Life (United States)
- November 1 - Maya the Bee Movie (Australia)
- November 7 - Big Hero 6 (United States)
- November 26 - Penguins of Madagascar (United States)
- December 12 - The Snow Queen 2: Magic of the Ice Mirror (United Kingdom)

== Television series debuts ==
Date	Title	Channel	Year
January 7	Numb Chucks	YTV	2014–2016
January 9	Go! Go! 575	Tokyo MX	2014
January 13	Chozen	FX	2014
January 18	Pokémon the Series: XY	Cartoon Network	2014
January 19	Get Ace	Eleven	2014
January 20	Sheriff Callie's Wild West	Disney Junior	2014–2017
February 3	Wallykazam!	Nick Jr.	2014–2017
February 12	Mixels	Cartoon Network	2014–2016
February 17	Breadwinners	Nickelodeon	2014–2016
March 12	Nerds and Monsters	YTV	2014–2016
April 2	TripTank	Comedy Central	2014–2016
April 9	The Tom and Jerry Show	Cartoon Network, Boomerang	2014–2021
April 11	Piggy Tales	Toons.TV	2014–2019
April 14	Clarence	Cartoon Network	2014–2018
May 2	Space Racers	PBS Kids, Universal Kids	2014–2018
May 23	Tumble Leaf	Amazon Video	2014–2019
July 7	The 7D	Disney XD	2014–2016
July 12	Astroblast!	Universal Kids	2014–2015
August 18	Dora and Friends: Into the City!	Nick Jr.	2014–2017
August 22	BoJack Horseman	Netflix	2014–2020
September 21	Mr. Pickles	Adult Swim	2014–2019
September 22	Jorel's Brother	Cartoon Network Brazil	2014–2025
October 3	Star Wars Rebels	Disney XD	2014–2018
October 13	Blaze and the Monster Machines	Nick Jr.	2014–2025/2026
October 27	Stone Quackers	FXX	2014–2015
October 27	Mike Tyson Mysteries	Adult Swim	2014–2020
November 1	Angry Birds Stella	Toons.TV	2014–2016
November 3	Over the Garden Wall	Cartoon Network	2014
November 8	Sonic Boom	Cartoon Network	2014–2017
November 26	VeggieTales in the House	Netflix	2014–2016
December 5	Penn Zero: Part-Time Hero	Disney XD	2014–2017
December 19	All Hail King Julien	Netflix	2014–2017

== Television series endings ==
Date	Title	Channel	Year	Notes
January 18	The Aquabats! Super Show!	Hub Network	2012–2014	Cancelled
February 8	Monsters vs. Aliens	Nickelodeon	2013–2014	Cancelled
March 7	Star Wars: The Clone Wars	Cartoon Network	2008–2014	Cancelled, until revived by Disney+ in 2020.
March 31	Chozen	FX	2014	Cancelled
April 4	Fish Hooks	Disney Channel	2010–2014	Ended
June 5	Dora the Explorer	Nickelodeon	2000–2014	Cancelled, until the unaired episodes premiered in 2019.
June 7	Sabrina: Secrets of a Teenage Witch	Hub Network	2013–2014	Cancelled
June 23	The Boondocks	Adult Swim	2005–2014	Ended
July 18	Total Drama	Cartoon Network	2008–2014	Ended
July 20	Superjail!	Adult Swim	2007–2014	Ended
August 2	DC Nation Shorts	Cartoon Network	2011–2014	Ended
September 28	Beware the Batman	Adult Swim	2013–2014	Ended
October 22	NFL Rush Zone	Nicktoons	2010–2014	Ended
November 7	Over the Garden Wall	Cartoon Network	2014	Ended
November 14	Ben 10: Omniverse	Cartoon Network	2012–2014	Ended
November 18	Martha Speaks	PBS Kids	2008–2014	Ended
December 19	The Legend of Korra	Nick.com	2012–2014	Ended
December 20	Pokémon the Series: XY	Cartoon Network	2014	Ended
December 25	Johnny Test	Cartoon Network	2009–2014	Ended, until revived by Netflix in 2021.

== Television season premieres ==
Date	Title	Season	Channel
April 11	Mickey Mouse	2	Disney Channel
April 21	Adventure Time	6	Cartoon Network
June 5	The Amazing World of Gumball	3	Cartoon Network
June 12	Teen Titans Go!	2	Cartoon Network
July 12	Sanjay and Craig	2	Nickelodeon
August 1	Gravity Falls	2	Disney Channel/Disney XD
August 13	Paw Patrol	2	Nickelodeon (Note: Season later premiered in Canada on TVO on August 27th.)
September 14	American Dad!	11	Fox
September 24	South Park	18	Comedy Central
September 28	Family Guy	13	Fox
September 28	The Simpsons	26	Fox
October 5	Bob's Burgers	5	Fox
October 9	Regular Show	6	Cartoon Network
October 20	American Dad!	12	TBS

== Television season finales ==
Date	Title	Season	Channel
March 7	Mickey Mouse	1	Disney Channel
March 17	Adventure Time	5	Cartoon Network
April 14	Rick and Morty	1	Adult Swim (Cartoon Network)
May 18	American Dad!	10	Fox
May 18	Bob's Burgers	4	Fox
May 18	Family Guy	12	Fox
May 18	The Simpsons	25	Fox
June 5	Teen Titans Go!	1	Cartoon Network
July 19	Sanjay and Craig	1	Nickelodeon
August 2	Paw Patrol	1	TVO (Note: Season later concluded in the US on Nickelodeon on August 18th.)
August 14	Regular Show	5	Cartoon Network
August 22	BoJack Horseman	1	Netflix
September 21	American Dad!	11	Fox
December 4	Wander Over Yonder	1	Disney XD
December 10	South Park	18	Comedy Central

== Deaths ==
=== January ===
- January 5: Carmen Zapata, American actress (voice of Maria Vargas in Batman: The Animated Series, Fairy #7 in the Happily Ever After: Fairy Tales for Every Child episode "Sleeping Beauty"), dies at age 86.
- January 6: Larry D. Mann, Canadian actor (voice of Yukon Cornelius in Rudolph the Red-Nosed Reindeer), dies at age 91.
- January 10: Russell Johnson, American actor (voice of Roy Hinkley in The New Adventures of Gilligan and Gilligan's Planet), dies at age 89.
- January 16: Hal Sutherland, American painter, film director and animator (Walt Disney Company, co-founder of Filmation), dies at age 84.
- January 19: Michael Sporn, American animator and film director (Doctor DeSoto, The Man Who Walked Between the Towers) and producer (Michael Sporn Animation), dies at age 67.
- January 21: Bill Kresse, American animator and comics artist (Terrytoons), dies at age 80.
- January 27: Ichiro Nagai, Japanese actor, dies at age 82.
- January 30:
  - Arthur Rankin Jr., American film director and producer (Rankin/Bass), dies at age 89.
  - Campbell Lane, Canadian actor (voice of Skeletor in The New Adventures of He-Man, Narrator in Gundam Wing, Mastermind in X-Men: Evolution, Rampage in Beast Wars: Transformers, Mr. Clancy in G.I. Joe Extreme, Baloo in Adventures of Mowgli, Elder Kulatak in the He-Man and the Masters of the Universe episode "Trust"), dies at age 78.
- January 31: Don Vanderbeek, American background artist (Metro-Goldwyn-Mayer Animation, Johnny Bravo, Globehunters: An Around the World in 80 Days Adventure, Make Way for Noddy, Eight Crazy Nights, Candy Land: The Great Lollipop Adventure, The Simpsons), dies from esophageal cancer at age 64.

=== February ===
- February 2: Philip Seymour Hoffman, American actor, director and producer (voice of Max Jerry Horowitz in Mary and Max, Will Toffman in the Arthur episode "No Acting, Please"), dies from a drug overdose at age 46.
- February 12: Sid Caesar, American actor and writer (voice of King Goochi in Intergalactic Thanksgiving, Marty Kazoo in Life with Louie, Jacob in Globehunters: An Around the World in 80 Days Adventure), dies at age 91.
- February 16: Jimmy T. Murakami, American film director and animator (Toei Animation, The Snowman, The Magic Pear Tree), dies at age 80.
- February 24: Harold Ramis, American actor, (voice of Zeke in Heavy Metal), comedian, director and writer (Rover Dangerfield), dies at age 69.

=== March ===
- March 18:
  - Jorge Arvizu, Mexican actor (Spanish dub voice of Bugs Bunny, Popeye, Fred Flintstone, and Magilla Gorilla, and Benny and Choo-Choo in Top Cat: The Movie), dies at age 81.
  - Joe Lala, American musician and actor (voice of Mr. Estevez in The Adventures of Jimmy Neutron, Boy Genius, Hector's Dad in Ozzy & Drix, Enrique in the All Grown Up! episode "Dude, Where's My Horse?", Leonardo da Vinci in the Time Squad episode "Daddio DaVinci", additional voices in Monsters, Inc., The Twisted Tales of Felix the Cat, and The Legend of Calamity Jane), dies at age 66.
- March 27: Richard Lorenzana, American production accountant (The Simpsons, Futurama, Napoleon Dynamite), dies at age 69.

=== April ===
- April 6: Mickey Rooney, American actor (voice of Oswald the Lucky Rabbit in the mid-1930s, Santa Claus in the Rankin/Bass Productions Christmas specials, adult Tod in The Fox and the Hound, Mr. Cherrywood in The Care Bears Movie, Flip in Little Nemo: Adventures in Slumberland, himself in The Simpsons episode "Radioactive Man", and the short producer in the American Dad! episode "A Star is Reborn"), dies at age 93.
- April 29: Bob Hoskins, English actor (portrayed Eddie Valiant in Who Framed Roger Rabbit, voice of Boris in Balto), dies at age 71.

=== May ===
- May 2: Efrem Zimbalist Jr., American actor (voice of Alfred Pennyworth in the DC Animated Universe, Dr. Octopus in Spider-Man, Justin Hammer in Iron Man), dies at age 95.

=== June ===
- June 9: Rik Mayall, English actor (voice of Prince Froglip in The Princess and the Goblin, Brigand in The Thief and the Cobbler, Cacofonix in Asterix Conquers America, The Robber King in The Snow Queen, Mr. Toad in The Wind in the Willows, Gerard in Gormless in A Monkey's Tale, Tom Thumb in The World of Peter Rabbit and Friends, Narrator in Jellabies, Kehaar in Watership Down, King Arthur in King Arthur's Disasters, Cufflingk in Valiant, Lord Reginald in the SpongeBob SquarePants episode "Chimps Ahoy", Seven Dwarfs in Snow White: The Sequel), dies at age 56.
- June 15: Casey Kasem, American actor (voice of Shaggy Rogers in Scooby-Doo, Robin in Super Friends, Cliffjumper in Transformers, and the titular character in Here Comes Peter Cottontail), dies at age 82.
- June 23: Steve Viksten, American television writer (Rugrats, Duckman, Hey Arnold!, Recess, Higglytown Heroes, The Simpsons), and actor (voice of Oskar Kokoshka in Hey Arnold!), dies at age 53.
- June 26: Wolf Koenig, Canadian film director and animator (worked for Colin Low), dies at age 86.
- June 28: Meshach Taylor, American actor (voice of Cecil in The Secret of NIMH 2: Timmy to the Rescue, Doctor Harris in the Static Shock episode "Aftershock"), dies at age 67.
- June 30: Bob Hastings, American actor (voice of Commissioner Gordon in the DC Animated Universe, Superboy in The Adventures of Superboy, Henry Glopp in Jeannie, D.D. in Clue Club), dies at age 89.

=== July ===
- July 6: Tô Hoài, Vietnamese writer, playwright, screenwriter, journalist and animator, dies at age 93.
- July 7: Dick Jones, American actor (voice of the title character in Pinocchio), dies at age 87.
- July 19: James Garner, American actor (voice of God in God, the Devil and Bob, Commander Rourke in Atlantis: The Lost Empire, Shazam in Superman/Shazam!: The Return of Black Adam), dies at age 86.
- July 28: James Shigeta, Japanese-American actor (voice of General Li in Mulan, Old Wanderer in the Avatar: The Last Airbender episode "The Spirit World-Winter Solstice, Part 1"), dies at age 85.

=== August ===
- August 4: Walter Massey, Canadian actor (voice of Admiral Zogal and Deathforce Officer in Space Carrier Blue Noah, Captain Perez and The Doctor in The Mysterious Cities of Gold, Papa and Dr. Nose in Adventures of the Little Koala, Uncle Henry in The Wonderful Wizard of Oz, Polluto in The Smoggies, Plato in The Little Flying Bears, Geppetto in Saban's Adventures of Pinocchio, Piers McMaster in C.L.Y.D.E., Guru Lou in Samurai Pizza Cats, Papa Beaver in Papa Beaver's Storytime, Mr. Gronkle in The Busy World of Richard Scarry, Dentist in The Little Lulu Show, Principal Herbert Haney and Mr. Marco in Arthur, Mr. Tinker in How the Toys Saved Christmas, Dr. Stewart in Lassie, Santa Claus in Caillou's Holiday Movie, Shen-Shen's Great Great Uncle in the Sagwa, the Chinese Siamese Cat episode "Wedding Day Mess", additional voices in Diplodos, Bumpety Boo, Sharky and George, The Adventures of Peter Pan, Saban's Adventures of the Little Mermaid, Bob in a Bottle, Robinson Sucroe, Animal Crackers, The Country Mouse and the City Mouse Adventures, Caillou, Patrol 03, Ripley's Believe It or Not!, For Better or For Worse, A Miss Mallard Mystery, Wunschpunsch and Tripping the Rift), dies at age 85.
- August 6: David Weidman, American animator and poster designer (UPA, Hanna-Barbera), dies at age 93.
- August 11:
  - Robin Williams, American actor and comedian (portrayed himself in the SpongeBob SquarePants episode "Truth or Square", voice of Mork in Mork & Mindy/Laverne & Shirley/Fonz Hour, Genie in Aladdin, Aladdin and the King of Thieves and Great Minds Think 4 Themselves, The Kiwi in A Wish for Wings That Work, Batty Koda in FernGully: The Last Rainforest, Fender Pinwheeler in Robots, Ramón and Lovelace in Happy Feet and Happy Feet Two), commits suicide at age 63.
  - Liz Holzman, American animator (Alvin and the Chipmunks), storyboard artist (Marvel Productions, Disney Television Animation, Animated Stories from the Bible, Garfield and Friends, Curious George), character designer (Disney Television Animation), prop designer (TaleSpin), art director, writer, director and producer (Warner Bros. Animation), dies from cancer at age 61.
- August 12: Lauren Bacall, American actress and voice actress (voice of Freezelda in HBO Storybook Musicals, Madame Lacroque in Madeline: Lost in Paris, The Grand Witch in Scooby-Doo! and the Goblin King, the Witch of the Waste in Howl's Moving Castle, The Grey One in Ernest and Celestine, Evelyn in the Family Guy episode "Mom's the Word"), dies at age 89.
- August 18: Don Pardo, American announcer (voice of the Announcer in Totally Minnie, himself in The Simpsons episodes "Moe Letter Blues" and "Moonshine River"), dies at age 96.

=== September ===
- September 4: Joan Rivers, American actress and comedian (narrator in The Adventures of Letterman segments in The Electric Company, and voice of Zonthara in Dave the Barbarian, Dot Matrix in Spaceballs: The Animated Series, Bubbe in Arthur, Annie Dubinsky in The Simpsons episode "The Ten-Per-Cent Solution", and herself in Shrek 2), dies at age 81.
- September 10: Richard Kiel, American actor (voice of Vladimir in Tangled), dies at age 74.
- September 16: Buster Jones, American actor (voice of Black Vulcan in Super Friends, Doc in G.I. Joe: A Real American Hero, Blaster in The Transformers, Winston Zeddemore in seasons 4-7 of The Real Ghostbusters, and Extreme Ghostbusters), dies at age 70.

=== October ===
- October 8: Heino Pars, Estonian film director, dies at age 88.
- October 9: Jan Hooks, American actress and comedian (voice of Lil in Frosty Returns, Manjula Nahasapeemapetilon in The Simpsons, Angleyne in the Futurama episode "Bendless Love", Nadine in the Game Over episode "Monkey Dearest", Mrs. Kellogg in The Cleveland Show episode "Mr. & Mrs. Brown"), dies from throat cancer at age 57.
- October 14: Elizabeth Peña, American actress, writer and musician (voice of Paran Dul in Justice League and Justice League Unlimited, Rosa Santos in Maya & Miguel, Mirage in The Incredibles, Maria and Gold Digger in the Minoriteam episode "Landon in Love", Store Owner in the American Dad! episode "American Dream Factory"), dies from cirrhosis at age 55.

=== November ===
- November 1: Hugues Le Bars, French composer (Oggy and the Cockroaches), dies at age 64.
- November 2: Larry Latham, American animator, artist, producer and director (Hanna-Barbera, Disney Television Animation), dies from cancer at age 61.
- November 3: Tom Magliozzi, American radio host (voice of Click Tappet in the Arthur episode "Pick a Car, Any Car", and Click and Clack's As the Wrench Turns, Rusty Rust-eze in Cars and Cars 3) and television writer (Click and Clack's As the Wrench Turns), dies from Alzheimer's disease at age 77.
- November 4: Paul Gruwell, American animator (Hanna-Barbera, Heavy Metal, Marvel Productions, Garbage Pail Kids, Bonkers), background artist (The New Batman Adventures, Batman Beyond, Mission Hill), storyboard artist (Garbage Pail Kids, Alvin and the Chipmunks, DuckTales, Bonkers, Duckman), sheet timer (The Simpsons) and director (Garfield and Friends), dies at age 80.
- November 10: Gaetano Varcasia, Italian actor (dub voice of Mickey Mouse from 1988 to 1995), dies at age 55.
- November 23: Haunani Minn, American actress (voice of Cinnamon Teal and Sen-Sen in DuckTales, Mrs. Lee and Dr. Dihn in Clifford the Big Red Dog, Dr. Lee in the Batman: The Animated Series episode "Blind as a Bat", Mrs. Kim in the Static Shock episode "Tantrum"), dies at age 67.
- November 28: Brumsic Brandon Jr., American comics artist and animator (worked for RCA and J.R. Bray), dies at age 87.

=== December ===
- December 11: Robert Taylor, American animator, producer, writer and film director (The Nine Lives of Fritz the Cat), dies at age 69 or 70 from COPD.
- December 13: Martha Sigall, American animator, inker and painter (Warner Bros. Cartoons), dies at age 97.
- December 14: Norman Bridwell, American author and cartoonist (creator of Clifford the Big Red Dog), dies at age 86.
- December 18: Harold M. Schulweis, American rabbi and author (special technical consultant for The Simpsons episode "Like Father, Like Clown"), dies from heart disease at age 89.
- December 22: Christine Cavanaugh, American actress, (voice of Chuckie Finster in Rugrats, Gosalyn Mallard in Darkwing Duck, Dexter in Dexter's Laboratory, Bunnie Rabbot in Sonic the Hedgehog, Oblina in Aaahh!!! Real Monsters), dies at age 51.
- December 27: Gennady Sokolsky, Russian illustrator, animator and film director (Happy Merry-Go-Round, Well, Just You Wait!, The Adventures of Lolo the Penguin), dies at age 77.
- December 29: András Erkel, Hungarian producer (Varga Studio, founder of Studio Baestarts), dies from heart failure and brain cancer at age 52.
- December 31: Chris Moeller, American animator, storyboard artist (The Simpsons, Recess, King of the Hill), director (The Twisted Tales of Felix the Cat, King of the Hill) and producer (creator of Tripping the Rift), dies at age 47.

== See also ==
- 2014 in anime
