= 86th Academy Awards =

- Official poster
- Date: March 2, 2014
- Site: Dolby Theatre; Hollywood, Los Angeles, California, U.S.
- Hosted by: Ellen DeGeneres
- Preshow hosts: Jess Cagle; Lara Spencer; Robin Roberts; Tyson Beckford
- Produced by: Neil Meron; Craig Zadan
- Directed by: Hamish Hamilton

Highlights
- Best Picture: 12 Years a Slave
- Most awards: Gravity (7)
- Most nominations: American Hustle and Gravity (10)

TV in the United States
- Network: ABC
- Duration: 3 hours, 34 minutes
- Ratings: 43.74 million 24.7% (Nielsen ratings)

The 86th Academy Awards ceremony, presented by the Academy of Motion Picture Arts and Sciences (AMPAS), honored the best films of 2013 and took place on March 2, 2014, at the Dolby Theatre in Hollywood, Los Angeles, beginning at 5:30 p.m. PST / 8:30 p.m. EST. The ceremony was scheduled well after its usual late-February date to avoid conflicting with the 2014 Winter Olympics. During the ceremony, the Academy of Motion Picture Arts and Sciences presented Academy Awards (commonly referred to as Oscars) in 24 categories. The ceremony was televised in the United States by ABC, and produced by Neil Meron and Craig Zadan and directed by Hamish Hamilton. Actress Ellen DeGeneres hosted the show for the second time, having previously hosted the 79th ceremony held in 2007.

In related events, the academy held its 5th annual Governors Awards ceremony at the Grand Ballroom of the Hollywood and Highland Center on November 16, 2013. On February 15, 2014, in a ceremony at The Beverly Hills Hotel in Beverly Hills, California, the Academy Awards for Technical Achievement were presented by hosts Kristen Bell and Michael B. Jordan.

12 Years a Slave won three awards, including Best Picture. Other winners included Gravity with seven awards, Dallas Buyers Club with three, Frozen and The Great Gatsby with two, and Blue Jasmine, The Great Beauty, Helium, Her, The Lady in Number 6: Music Saved My Life, Mr Hublot, and 20 Feet from Stardom with one. The telecast garnered nearly 44 million viewers in the United States, making it the most-watched Academy Award ceremony since the 72nd Academy Awards in 2000 and the most-watched non-sport program in American television since 2004.

== Winners and nominees ==
The nominees for the 86th Academy Awards were announced on January 16, 2014, at 5:38 a.m. PST (13:38 UTC), at the Samuel Goldwyn Theater in Beverly Hills, California, by Cheryl Boone Isaacs, president of the academy, and actor Chris Hemsworth. American Hustle and Gravity tied for the most nominations with ten each.

The winners were announced during the awards ceremony on March 2, 2014. American Hustle became David O. Russell's second consecutive film to earn nominations in all acting categories and the fifteenth film overall in Oscar history to achieve this distinction, but the first such film to not win any since 1936's My Man Godfrey. It also was the third film after Gangs of New York and True Grit to lose all ten of its nominations. 12 Years a Slave, directed by Steve McQueen, became the second film by a black director to receive a nomination for Best Picture and the first to win. McQueen became the third black person to receive a nomination for Best Directing and the first black Best Picture co-winner. John Ridley became the second black winner for writing. Alfonso Cuarón became the first person of Latin American descent to win Best Director.

With Matthew McConaughey and Jared Leto's respective wins in the Best Actor and Best Supporting Actor categories, Dallas Buyers Club was the fifth film to win both male acting awards. Megan Ellison became the first woman to score two Best Picture nominations in the same year. At 23, Jennifer Lawrence became the youngest actress to earn her third nomination. Cate Blanchett became the sixth actress to have won both female acting awards in her career. Lupita Nyong'o was the sixteenth Oscar acting winner to win for a debut film performance and the ninth Best Supporting Actress recipient to achieve this feat. Best Original Song co-winner Robert Lopez became the youngest individual to win all four major American entertainment awatds (Oscar, Emmy, Grammy, and Tony) and the 12th person overall to earn these accolades.

=== Awards ===
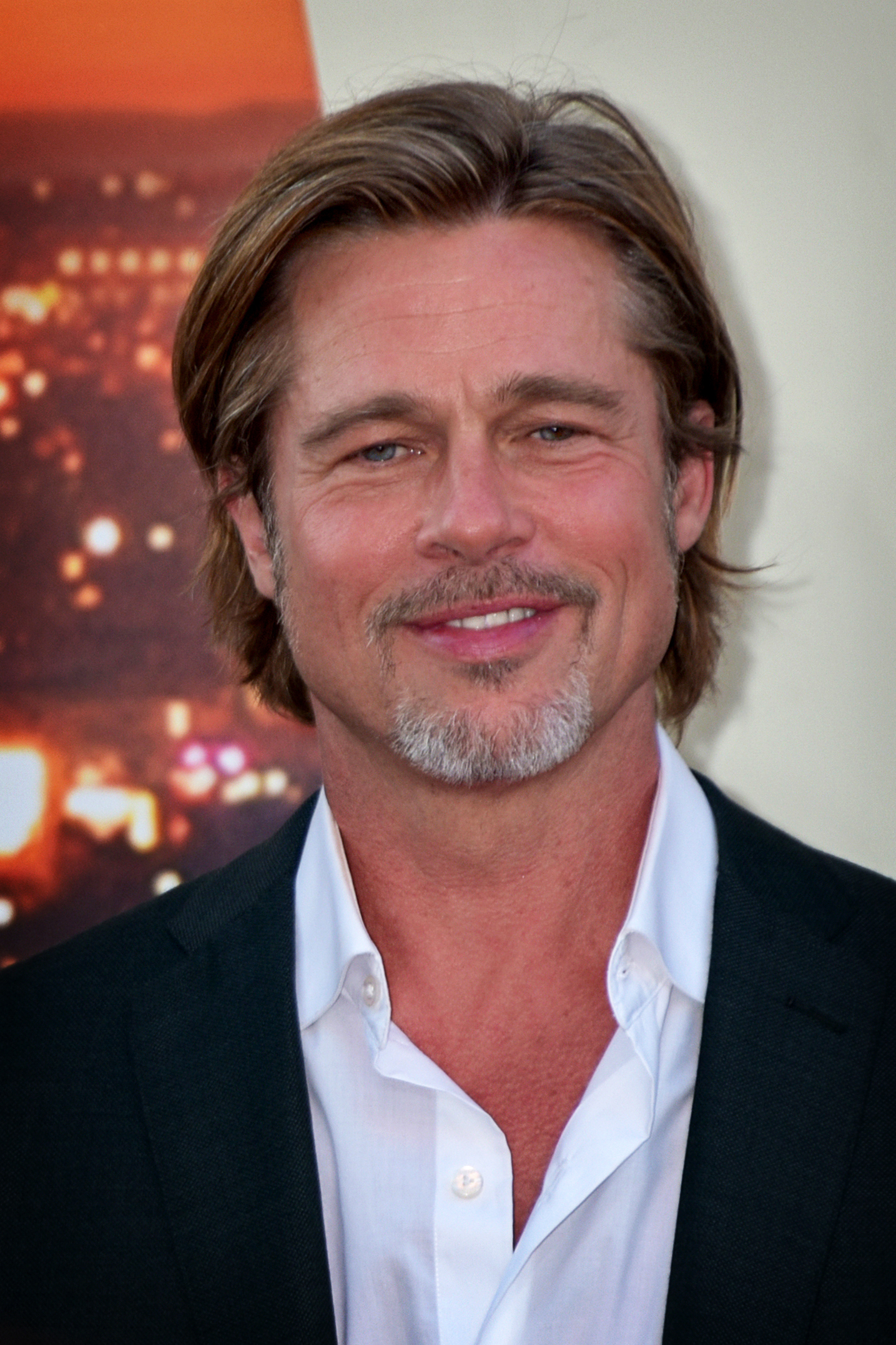
Brad Pitt, Best Picture co-winner

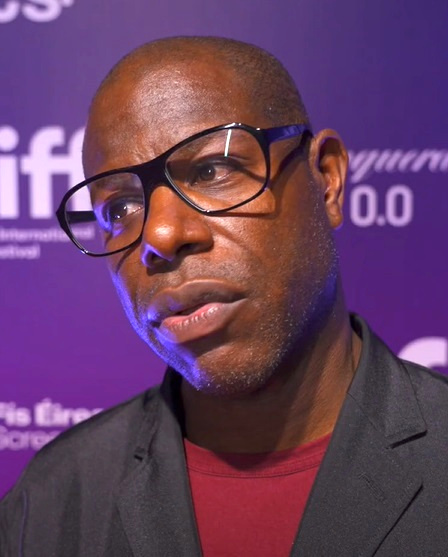
Steve McQueen, Best Picture co-winner

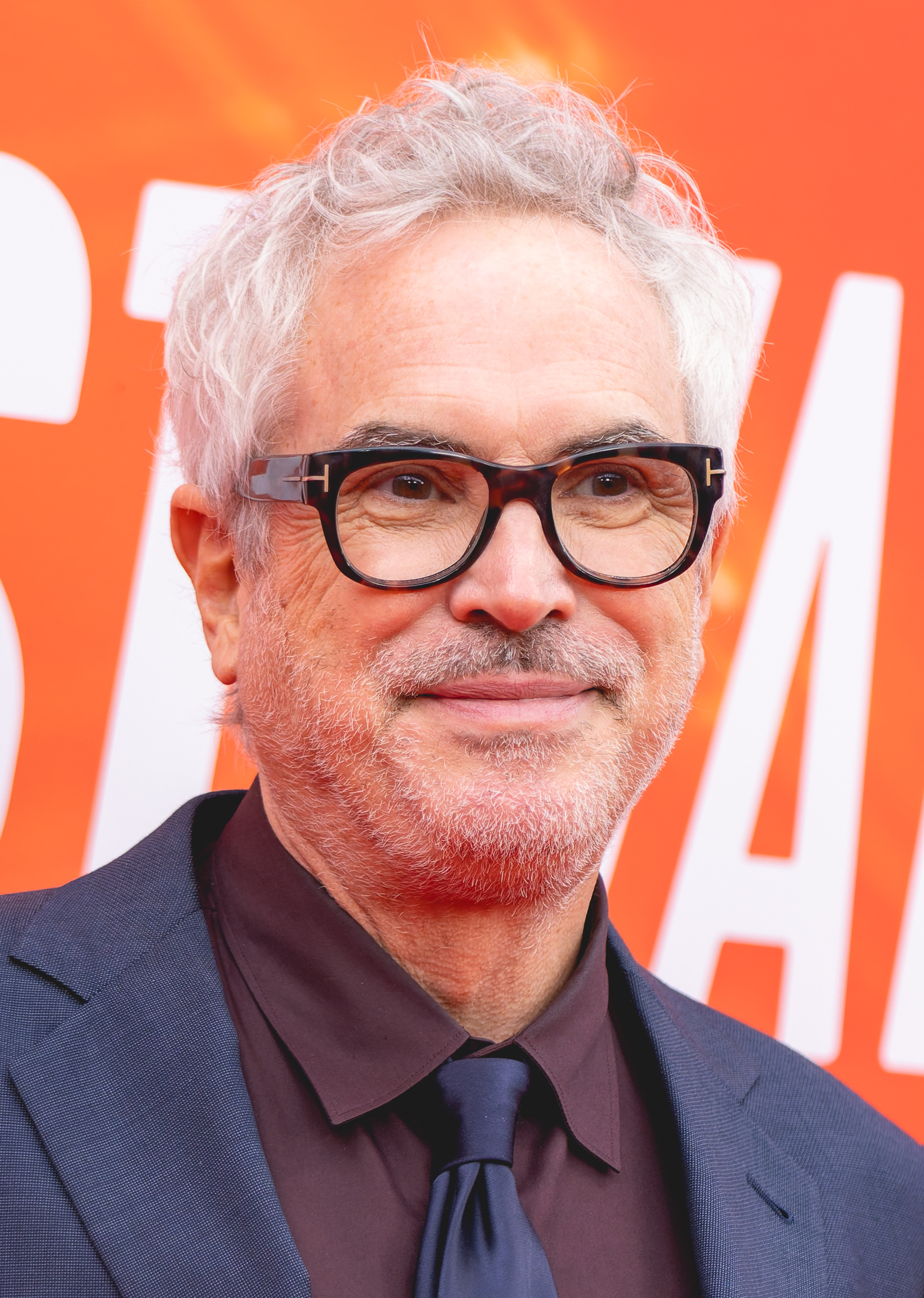
Alfonso Cuarón, Best Director winner and Best Film Editing co-winner

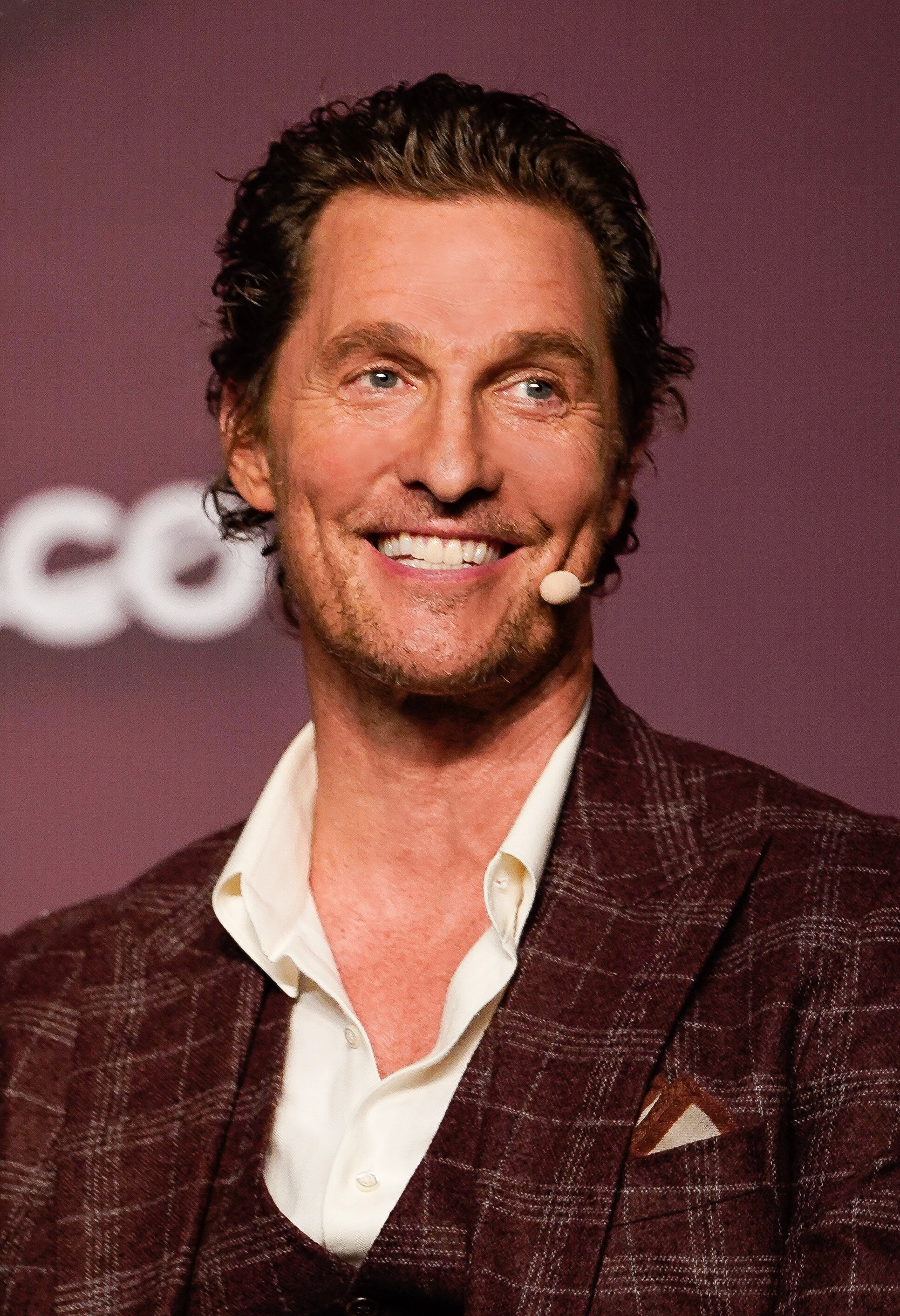
Matthew McConaughey, Best Actor winner

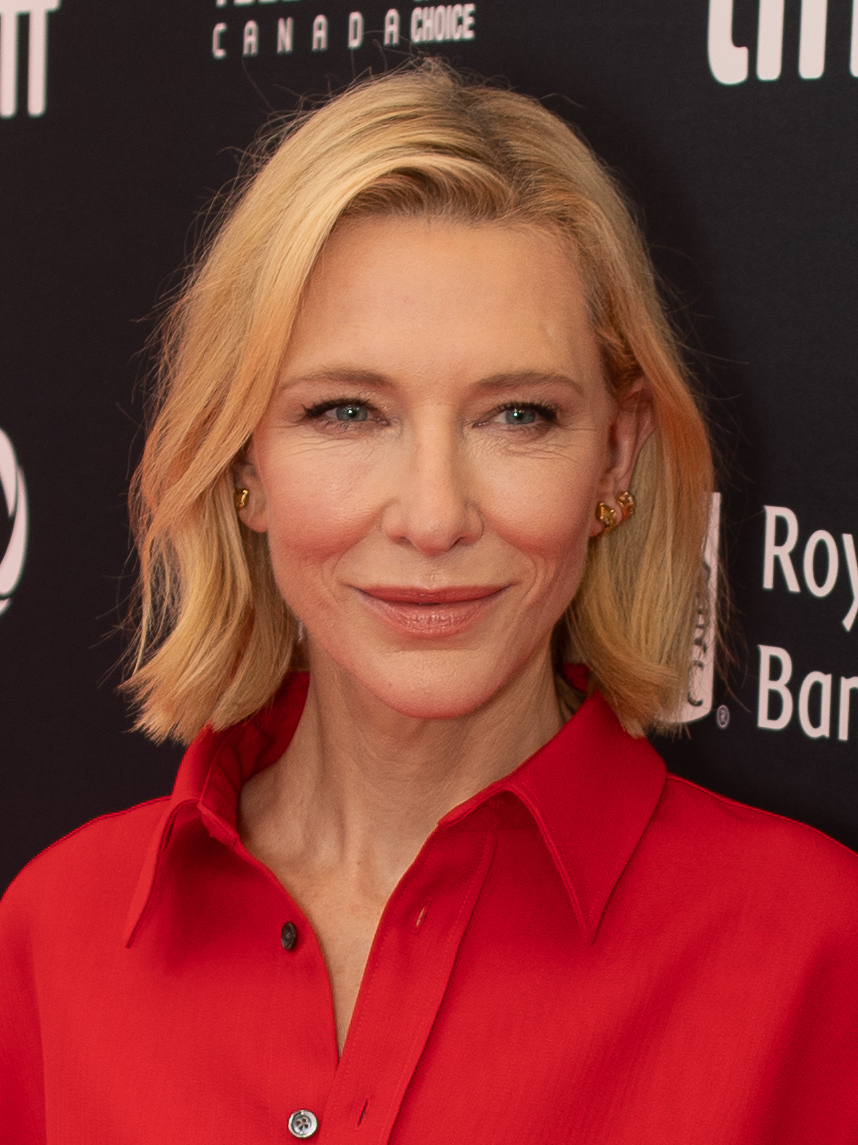
Cate Blanchett, Best Actress winner

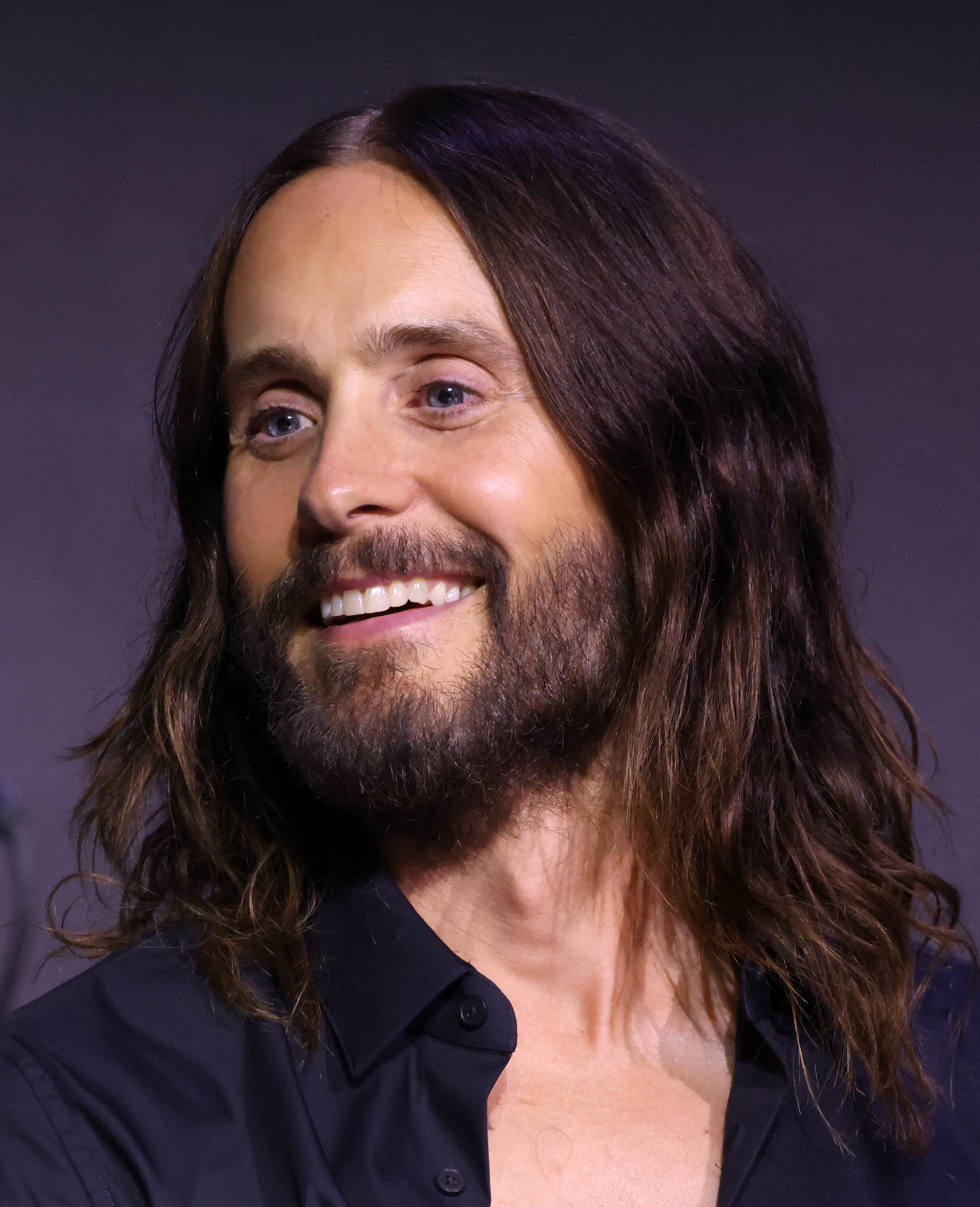
Jared Leto, Best Supporting Actor winner

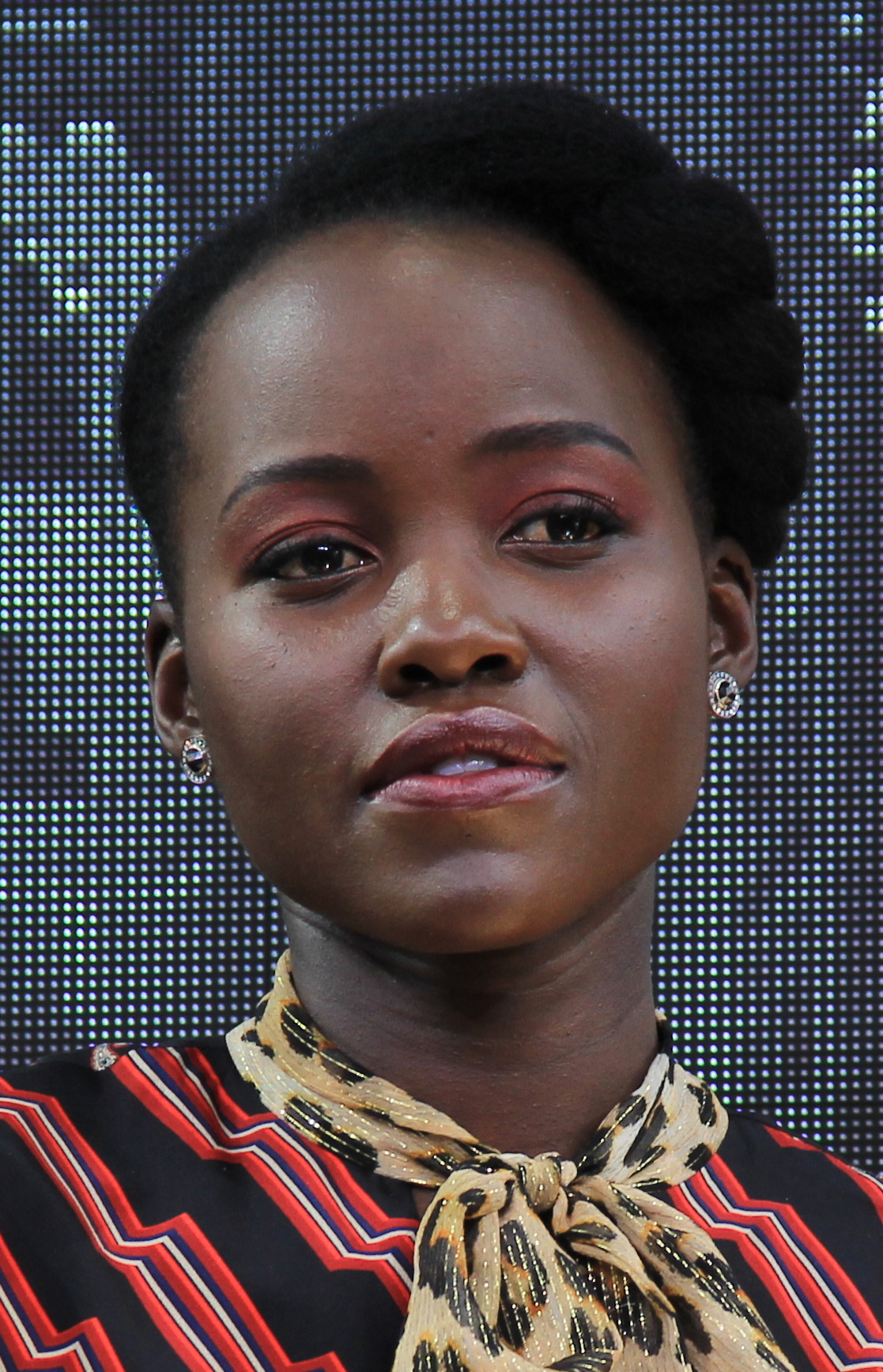
Lupita Nyong'o, Best Supporting Actress winner

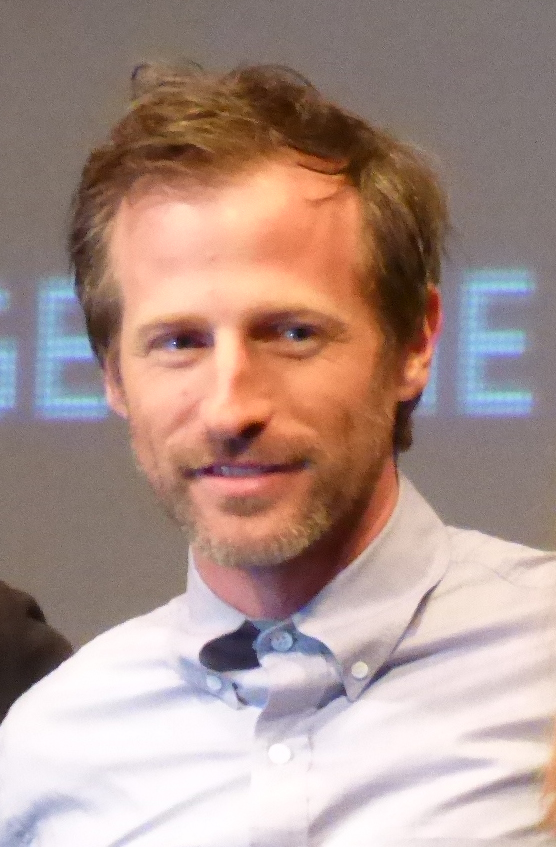
Spike Jonze, Best Original Screenplay winner

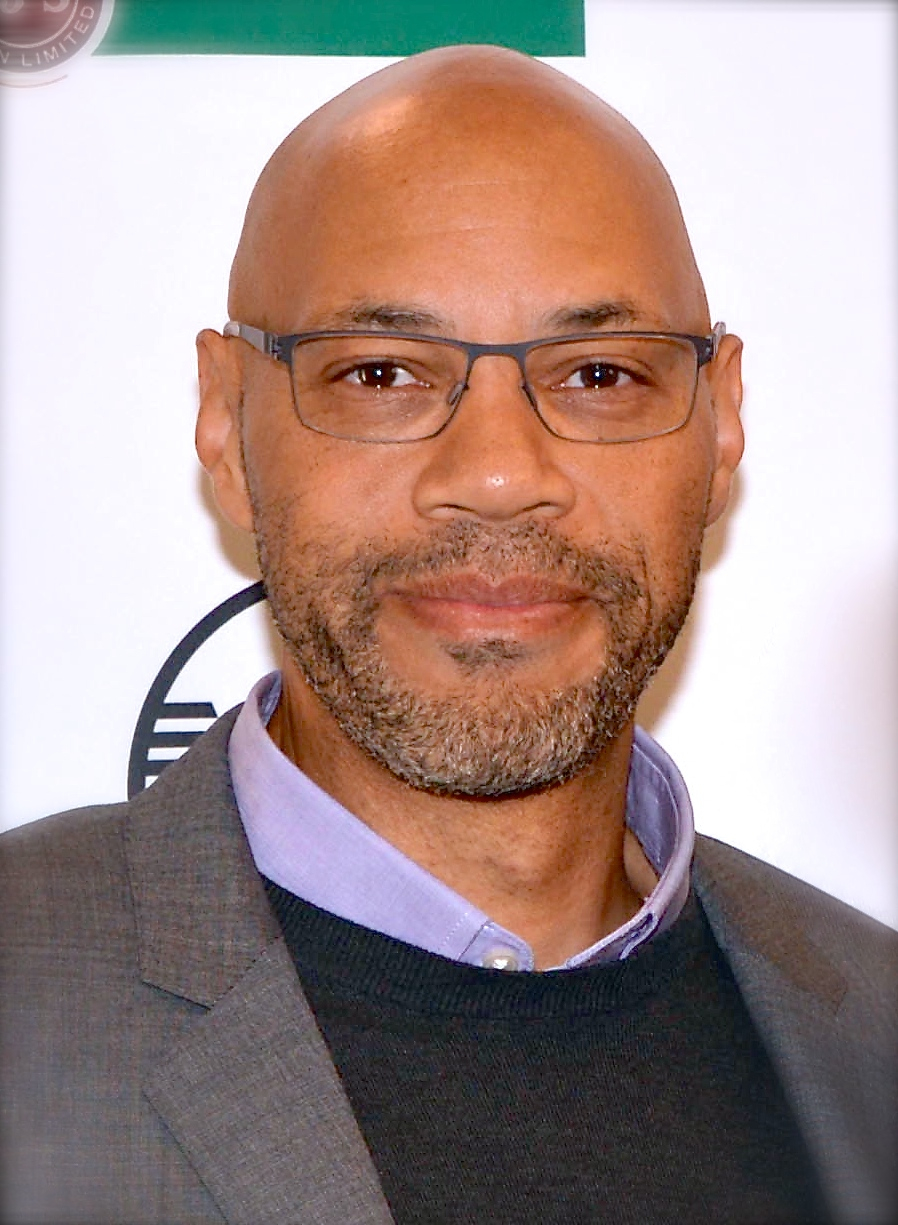
John Ridley, Best Adapted Screenplay winner

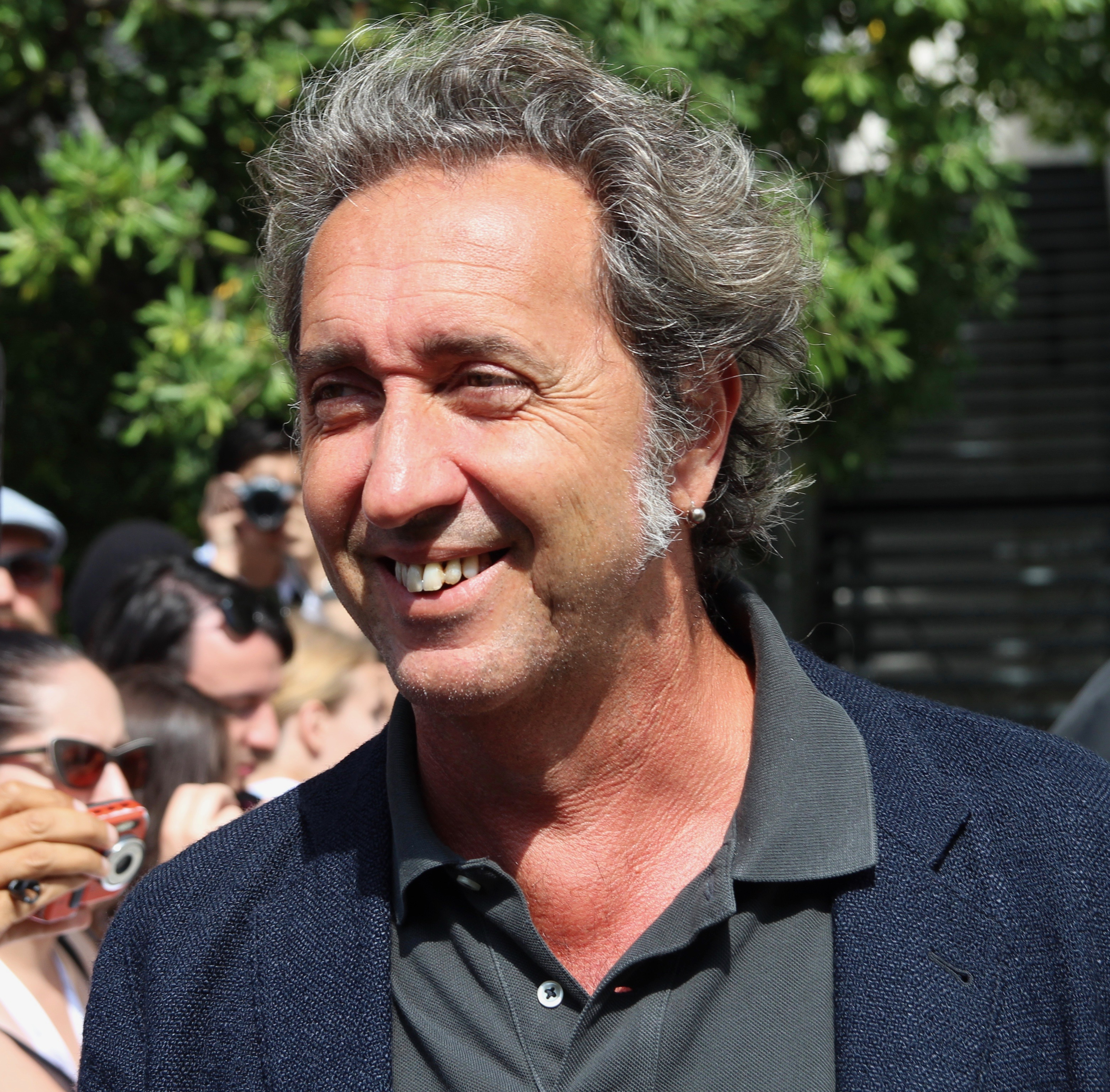
Paolo Sorrentino, Best Foreign Language Film winner

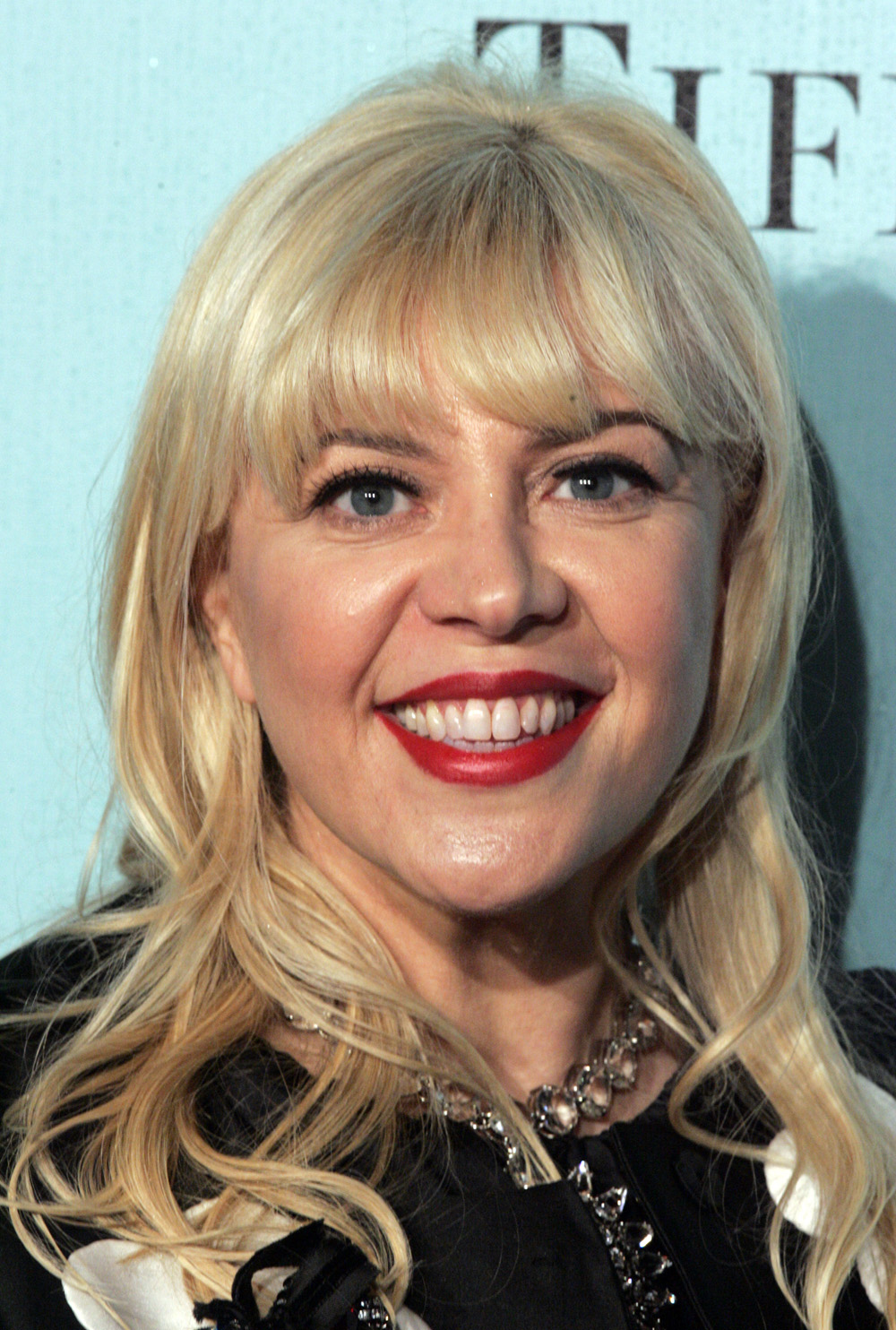
Catherine Martin, Best Production Design co-winner and Best Costume Design winner

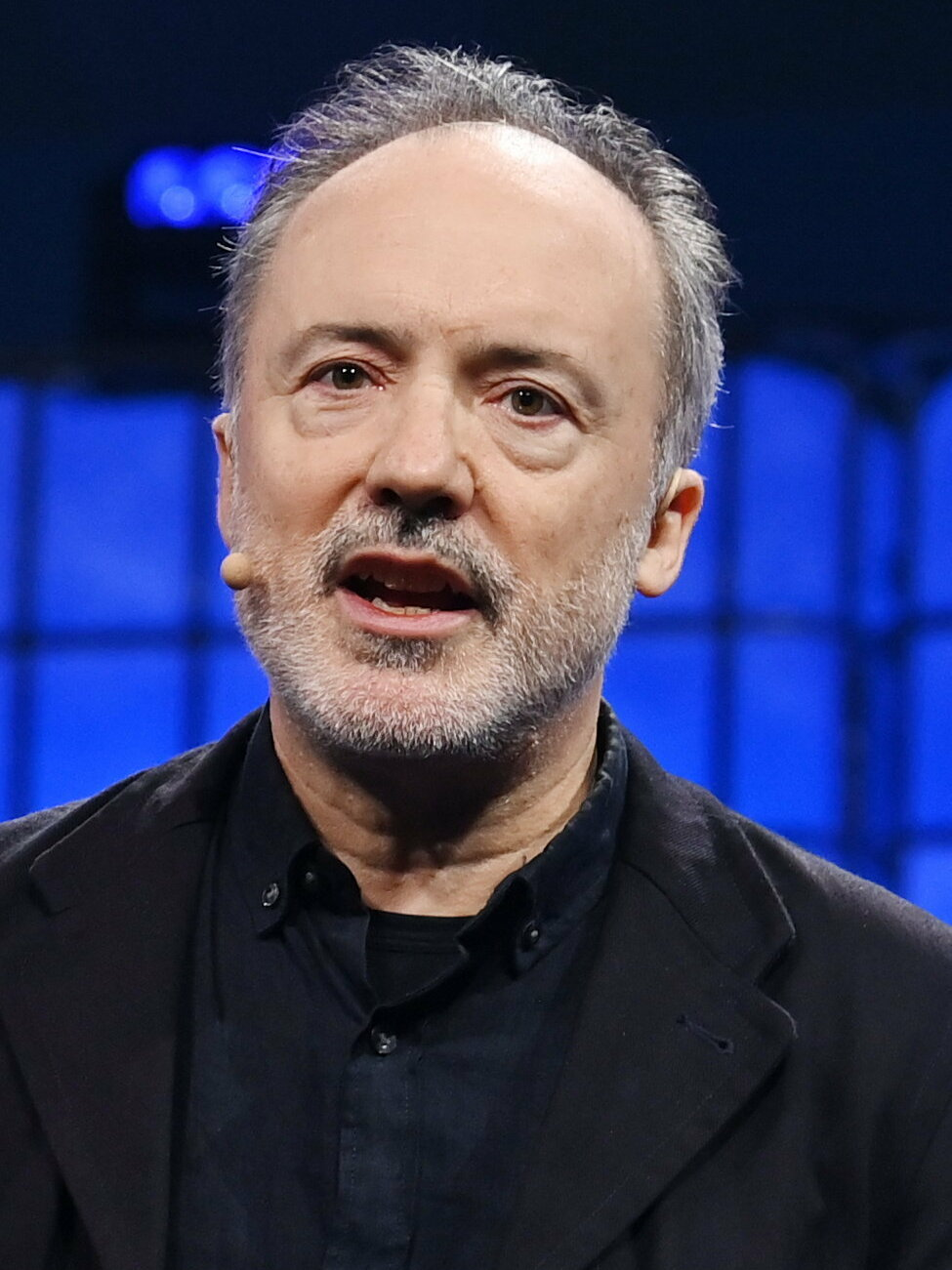
Tim Webber, Best Visual Effects co-winner

Winners are listed first, highlighted in boldface, and indicated with a double dagger (‡).

**Best Picture**: **12 Years a Slave – Brad Pitt, Dede Gardner, Jeremy Kleiner, Steve McQueen and Anthony Katagas, producers**‡; American Hustle – Charles Roven, Richard Suckle, Megan Ellison and Jonathan Gordon, producers; Captain Phillips – Scott Rudin, Dana Brunetti and Michael De Luca, producers; Dallas Buyers Club – Robbie Brenner and Rachel Winter, producers; Gravity – Alfonso Cuarón and David Heyman, producers; Her – Megan Ellison, Spike Jonze and Vincent Landay, producers; Nebraska – Albert Berger and Ron Yerxa, producers; Philomena – Gabrielle Tana, Steve Coogan and Tracey Seaward, producers; The Wolf of Wall Street – Martin Scorsese, Leonardo DiCaprio, Joey McFarland and Emma Tillinger Koskoff, producers	**Best Directing**: **Alfonso Cuarón – Gravity**‡; David O. Russell – American Hustle; Alexander Payne – Nebraska; Steve McQueen – 12 Years a Slave; Martin Scorsese – The Wolf of Wall Street
**Best Actor in a Leading Role**: **Matthew McConaughey – Dallas Buyers Club as Ron Woodroof**‡; Christian Bale – American Hustle as Irving Rosenfeld; Bruce Dern – Nebraska as Woodrow "Woody" Grant; Leonardo DiCaprio – The Wolf of Wall Street as Jordan Belfort; Chiwetel Ejiofor – 12 Years a Slave as Solomon Northup	**Best Actress in a Leading Role**: **Cate Blanchett – Blue Jasmine as Jeanette "Jasmine" Francis**‡; Amy Adams – American Hustle as Edith Greensly / Sydney Prosser; Sandra Bullock – Gravity as Dr. Ryan Stone; Judi Dench – Philomena as Philomena Lee; Meryl Streep – August: Osage County as Violet Weston
**Best Actor in a Supporting Role**: **Jared Leto – Dallas Buyers Club as Rayon**‡; Barkhad Abdi – Captain Phillips as Abduwali Muse; Bradley Cooper – American Hustle as Richard "Richie" DiMaso; Michael Fassbender – 12 Years a Slave as Edwin Epps; Jonah Hill – The Wolf of Wall Street as Donnie Azoff	**Best Actress in a Supporting Role**: **Lupita Nyong'o – 12 Years a Slave as Patsey**‡; Sally Hawkins – Blue Jasmine as Ginger; Jennifer Lawrence – American Hustle as Rosalyn Rosenfeld; Julia Roberts – August: Osage County as Barbara Weston-Fordham; June Squibb – Nebraska as Kate Grant
**Best Writing (Original Screenplay)**: **Her – Spike Jonze**‡; American Hustle – Eric Warren Singer and David O. Russell; Blue Jasmine – Woody Allen; Dallas Buyers Club – Craig Borten and Melisa Wallack; Nebraska – Bob Nelson	**Best Writing (Adapted Screenplay)**: **12 Years a Slave – John Ridley; based on the book Twelve Years a Slave by Solomon Northup**‡; Before Midnight – Richard Linklater, Julie Delpy and Ethan Hawke; based on characters created by Richard Linklater and Kim Krizan; Captain Phillips – Billy Ray; based on the book A Captain's Duty: Somali Pirates, Navy SEALs, and Dangerous Days at Sea by Richard Phillips with Stephan Talty; Philomena – Steve Coogan and Jeff Pope; based on the book The Lost Child of Philomena Lee by Martin Sixsmith; The Wolf of Wall Street – Terence Winter; based on the book by Jordan Belfort
**Best Animated Feature Film**: **Frozen – Chris Buck, Jennifer Lee and Peter Del Vecho**‡; The Croods – Chris Sanders, Kirk DeMicco and Kristine Belson; Despicable Me 2 – Chris Renaud, Pierre Coffin and Chris Meledandri; Ernest & Celestine – Benjamin Renner and Didier Brunner; The Wind Rises – Hayao Miyazaki and Toshio Suzuki	**Best Foreign Language Film**: **The Great Beauty (Italy) in Italian – Directed by Paolo Sorrentino**‡; The Broken Circle Breakdown (Belgium) in Dutch – Directed by Felix Van Groeningen; The Hunt (Denmark) in Danish – Directed by Thomas Vinterberg; The Missing Picture (Cambodia) in French – Directed by Rithy Panh; Omar (Palestine) in Arabic – Directed by Hany Abu-Assad
**Best Documentary (Feature)**: **20 Feet from Stardom – Morgan Neville, Caitrin Rogers and Gil Friesen** (posthumous award)‡; The Act of Killing – Joshua Oppenheimer and Signe Byrge Sørensen; Cutie and the Boxer – Zachary Heinzerling and Lydia Dean Pilcher; Dirty Wars – Richard Rowley and Jeremy Scahill; The Square – Jehane Noujaim and Karim Amer	**Best Documentary (Short Subject)**: **The Lady in Number 6: Music Saved My Life – Malcolm Clarke and Nicholas Reed**‡; CaveDigger – Jeffrey Karoff; Facing Fear – Jason Cohen; Karama Has No Walls – Sara Ishaq; Prison Terminal: The Last Days of Private Jack Hall – Edgar Barens
**Best Short Film (Live Action)**: **Helium – Anders Walter and Kim Magnusson**‡; That Wasn't Me – Esteban Crespo; Just Before Losing Everything – Xavier Legrand and Alexandre Gavras; Do I Have to Take Care of Everything? – Selma Vilhunen and Kirsikka Saari; The Voorman Problem – Mark Gill and Baldwin Li	**Best Short Film (Animated)**: **Mr Hublot – Laurent Witz and Alexandre Espigares**‡; Feral – Daniel Sousa and Dan Golden; Get a Horse! – Lauren MacMullan and Dorothy McKim; Possessions – Shuhei Morita; Room on the Broom – Max Lang and Jan Lachauer
**Best Music (Original Score)**: **Gravity – Steven Price**‡; The Book Thief – John Williams; Her – William Butler and Owen Pallett; Philomena – Alexandre Desplat; Saving Mr. Banks – Thomas Newman	**Best Music (Original Song)**: **"Let It Go" from Frozen – Music and Lyrics by Kristen Anderson-Lopez and Robert Lopez**‡; "Happy" from Despicable Me 2 – Music and Lyrics by Pharrell Williams; "The Moon Song" from Her – Music by Karen O; Lyrics by Karen O and Spike Jonze; "Ordinary Love" from Mandela: Long Walk to Freedom – Music by Paul Hewson, Dave Evans, Adam Clayton and Larry Mullen; Lyrics by Paul Hewson; ~~"Alone Yet Not Alone" from Alone yet Not Alone – Music by Bruce Broughton; Lyrics by Dennis Spiegel~~ (nomination revoked) (Note: The Academy revoked the Best Original Song nomination for Alone yet Not Alone's title song after determining that composer Bruce Broughton violated the Academy's promotional regulations. Broughton, a former Academy governor and member of the music branch's executive committee, had emailed other music branch members to inform them of his submission.)
**Best Sound Editing**: **Gravity – Glenn Freemantle**‡; All Is Lost – Steve Boeddeker and Richard Hymns; Captain Phillips – Oliver Tarney; The Hobbit: The Desolation of Smaug – Brent Burge and Chris Ward; Lone Survivor – Wylie Stateman	**Best Sound Mixing**: **Gravity – Skip Lievsay, Niv Adiri, Christopher Benstead and Chris Munro**‡; Captain Phillips – Chris Burdon, Mark Taylor, Mike Prestwood Smith and Chris Munro; The Hobbit: The Desolation of Smaug – Christopher Boyes, Michael Hedges, Michael Semanick and Tony Johnson; Inside Llewyn Davis – Skip Lievsay, Greg Orloff and Peter F. Kurland; Lone Survivor – Andy Koyama, Beau Borders and David Brownlow
**Best Production Design**: **The Great Gatsby – Production Design: Catherine Martin; Set Decoration: Beverley Dunn**‡; American Hustle – Production Design: Judy Becker; Set Decoration: Heather Loeffler; Gravity – Production Design: Andy Nicholson; Set Decoration: Rosie Goodwin and Joanne Woollard; Her – Production Design: K. K. Barrett; Set Decoration: Gene Serdena; 12 Years a Slave – Production Design: Adam Stockhausen; Set Decoration: Alice Baker	**Best Cinematography**: **Gravity – Emmanuel Lubezki**‡; The Grandmaster – Philippe Le Sourd; Inside Llewyn Davis – Bruno Delbonnel; Nebraska – Phedon Papamichael; Prisoners – Roger Deakins
**Best Makeup and Hairstyling**: **Dallas Buyers Club – Adruitha Lee and Robin Mathews**‡; Jackass Presents: Bad Grandpa – Stephen Prouty; The Lone Ranger – Joel Harlow and Gloria Pasqua-Casny	**Best Costume Design**: **The Great Gatsby – Catherine Martin**‡; American Hustle – Michael Wilkinson; The Grandmaster – William Chang Suk Ping; The Invisible Woman – Michael O'Connor; 12 Years a Slave – Patricia Norris
**Best Film Editing**: **Gravity – Alfonso Cuarón and Mark Sanger**‡; American Hustle – Jay Cassidy, Crispin Struthers and Alan Baumgarten; Captain Phillips – Christopher Rouse; Dallas Buyers Club – John Mac McMurphy (Note: "John Mac McMurphy" is a pseudonym for Jean-Marc Vallée.) and Martin Pensa; 12 Years a Slave – Joe Walker	**Best Visual Effects**: **Gravity – Tim Webber, Chris Lawrence, Dave Shirk and Neil Corbould**‡; The Hobbit: The Desolation of Smaug – Joe Letteri, Eric Saindon, David Clayton and Eric Reynolds; Iron Man 3 – Christopher Townsend, Guy Williams, Erik Nash and Dan Sudick; The Lone Ranger – Tim Alexander, Gary Brozenich, Edson Williams and John Frazier; Star Trek Into Darkness – Roger Guyett, Patrick Tubach, Ben Grossmann and Burt Dalton

=== Governors Awards ===
The academy held its 5th Annual Governors Awards ceremony on November 16, 2013, during which the following awards were presented:

==== Honorary Awards ====
- To Angela Lansbury, an entertainment icon who has created some of cinema's most memorable characters, inspiring generations of actors.
- To Steve Martin in recognition of his extraordinary talents and the unique inspiration he has brought to the art of motion pictures.
- To Piero Tosi, a visionary whose incomparable costume designs shaped timeless, living art in motion pictures.

==== Jean Hersholt Humanitarian Award ====
- Angelina Jolie

=== Films with multiple nominations and awards ===
The following 19 films received multiple nominations:

Nominations	Film
10	American Hustle
10	Gravity
9	12 Years a Slave
6	Captain Phillips
6	Dallas Buyers Club
6	Nebraska
5	Her
5	The Wolf of Wall Street
4	Philomena
3	Blue Jasmine
3	The Hobbit: The Desolation of Smaug
2	August: Osage County
2	Despicable Me 2
2	Frozen
2	The Grandmaster
2	The Great Gatsby
2	Inside Llewyn Davis
2	The Lone Ranger
2	Lone Survivor

The following five films received multiple awards:

Awards	Film
7	Gravity
3	Dallas Buyers Club
3	12 Years a Slave
2	Frozen
2	The Great Gatsby

== Presenters and performers ==
The following individuals and groups, listed in order of appearance, presented awards or performed musical numbers.

=== Presenters ===
Name(s)	Role
Cedering Fox	Announcer for the 86th annual Academy Awards
Anne Hathaway	Presenter of the award for Best Supporting Actor
Jim Carrey	Presenter of the animated heroes montage
Kerry Washington	Introducer of the performance of Best Original Song nominee "Happy"
Samuel L. Jackson; Naomi Watts	Presenters of the awards for Best Costume Design and Best Makeup and Hairstyling
Harrison Ford	Presenter of the films American Hustle, Dallas Buyers Club and The Wolf of Wall Street on the Best Picture segment
Channing Tatum	Introducer of the six winners of the Team Oscar contest
Matthew McConaughey; Kim Novak	Presenters of the awards for Best Animated Short Film and Best Animated Feature Film
Sally Field	Presenter of real life heroes montage
Joseph Gordon-Levitt; Emma Watson	Presenters of the award for Best Visual Effects
Zac Efron	Introducer of the performance of Best Original Song nominee "The Moon Song"
Kate Hudson; Jason Sudeikis	Presenters of the awards for Best Live Action Short and Best Documentary Short Subject
Bradley Cooper	Presenter of the award for Best Documentary Feature
Kevin Spacey	Presenter of the segment of the Honorary Academy Awards and the Jean Hersholt Humanitarian Award
Viola Davis; Ewan McGregor	Presenters of the award for Best Foreign Language Film
Tyler Perry	Presenter of the films Nebraska, Her and Gravity on the Best Picture segment
Brad Pitt	Introducer of the performance of Best Original Song nominee "Ordinary Love"
Kristen Bell; Michael B. Jordan	Presenters of the segment of the Academy Awards for Technical Achievement and the Gordon E. Sawyer Award
Chris Hemsworth; Charlize Theron	Presenters of the awards for Best Sound Mixing and Best Sound Editing
Christoph Waltz	Presenter of the award for Best Supporting Actress
Cheryl Boone Isaacs (AMPAS president)	Special presentation announcing the Academy Museum of Motion Pictures, to open in 2017
Amy Adams; Bill Murray	Presenters of the award for Best Cinematography
Anna Kendrick; Gabourey Sidibe	Presenters of the award for Best Film Editing
Whoopi Goldberg	Presenter of The Wizard of Oz 75th anniversary tribute and the performance of "Over the Rainbow"
Benedict Cumberbatch; Jennifer Garner	Presenters of the award for Best Production Design
Chris Evans	Presenter of the superheroes montage
Glenn Close	Presenter of the "In Memoriam" tribute
Goldie Hawn	Presenter of the films Philomena, Captain Phillips and 12 Years a Slave on the Best Picture segment
John Travolta	Introducer of the performance of Best Original Song nominee "Let It Go"
Jessica Biel; Jamie Foxx	Presenters of the awards for Best Original Score and Best Original Song
Penélope Cruz; Robert De Niro	Presenters of the awards for Best Adapted Screenplay and Best Original Screenplay
Angelina Jolie; Sidney Poitier	Presenters of the award for Best Director
Daniel Day-Lewis	Presenter of the award for Best Actress
Jennifer Lawrence	Presenter of the award for Best Actor
Will Smith	Presenter of the award for Best Picture

=== Performers ===
Name(s)	Role	Performed
William Ross	Musical arranger and conductor	Orchestral
Pharrell Williams	Performer	"Happy" from Despicable Me 2
Karen O Ezra Koenig	Performers	"The Moon Song" from Her
U2	Performers	"Ordinary Love" from Mandela: Long Walk to Freedom
Pink	Performer	"Over the Rainbow" as part of The Wizard of Oz 75th Anniversary tribute
Bette Midler	Performer	"Wind Beneath My Wings" during the annual "In Memoriam" tribute
Idina Menzel	Performer	"Let It Go" from Frozen

== Ceremony information ==
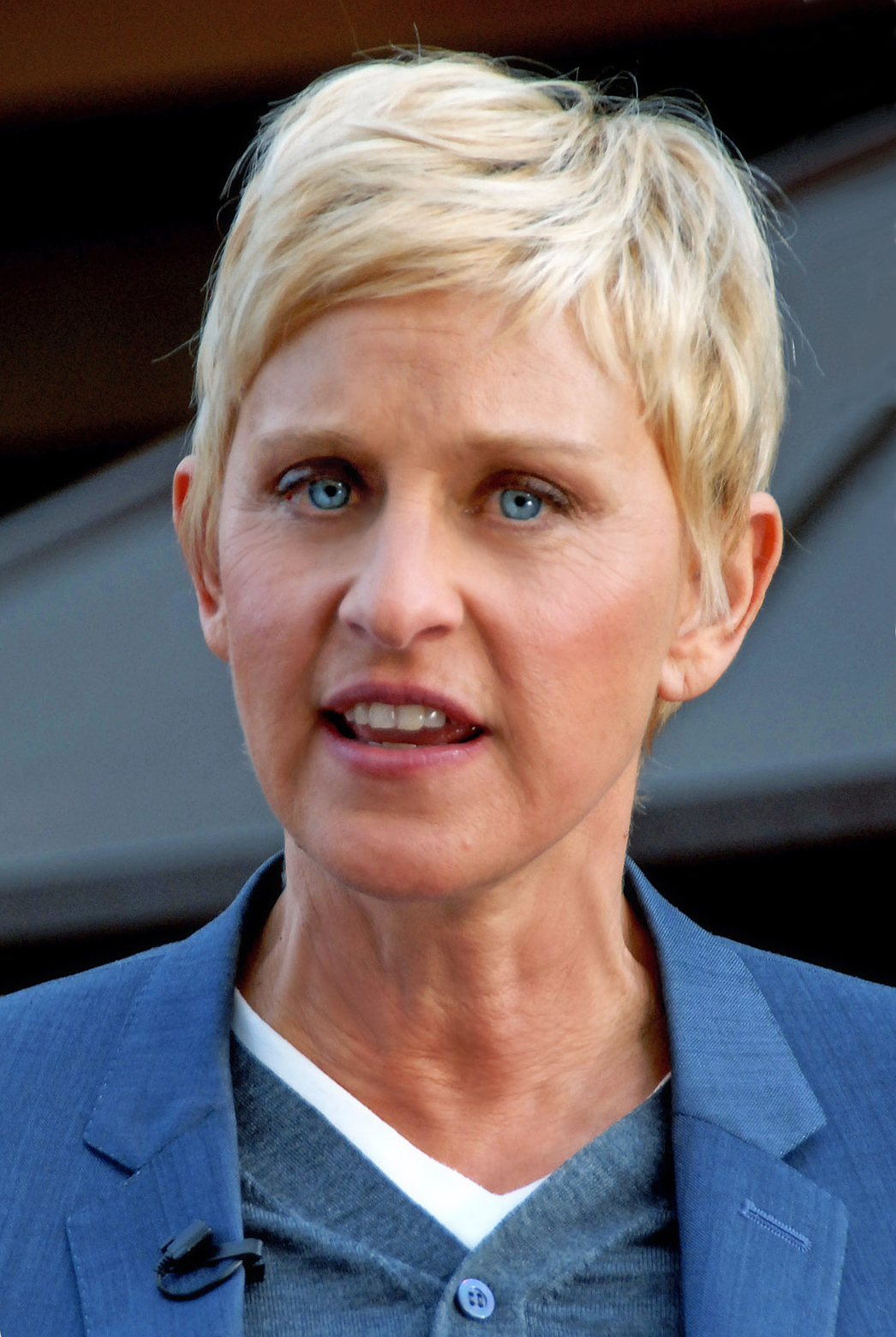
Ellen DeGeneres hosted the 86th Academy Awards

Despite the mixed reception received from the preceding year's ceremony, the academy rehired Neil Meron and Craig Zadan as producers for the second consecutive year. However, actor Seth MacFarlane announced that he would not host the Oscars for a second time. In a statement released through Twitter, he wrote "Traumatized critics exhale: I'm unable to do the Oscars again. Tried to make it work schedule-wise, but I need sleep." Furthermore, actress and comedian Tina Fey, who co-hosted the 70th Golden Globe Awards more than a month earlier with fellow Saturday Night Live alumnus Amy Poehler, told Huffington Post columnist Mike Ryan that she would reject any offer to host an Oscar telecast commenting, "I just feel like that gig is so hard. Especially for, like, a woman – the amount of months that would be spent trying on dresses alone – no way."

Shortly after the election of AMPAS president Cheryl Boone Isaacs in August 2013, Meron and Zadan announced that comedian and talk show host Ellen DeGeneres would host the 2014 ceremony. They explained their decision to bring back DeGeneres as host saying, "As a longtime friend, we had always hoped to find a project for us to do together and nothing could be more exciting than teaming up to do the Oscars. There are few stars today who have Ellen's gift for comedy, with her great warmth and humanity. She is beloved everywhere and we expect that the audience at the Dolby Theatre and in homes around the globe will be as excited by this news as we are." DeGeneres expressed that she was thrilled to be selected to emcee the gala again, commenting, "I am so excited to be hosting the Oscars for the second time. You know what they say – the third time's the charm."

As with last year's theme of music and the movies, Meron and Zadan centered the show around a theme. This year, they christened the show with a theme of saluting movie heroes commenting, "By celebrating the gamut of heroes who have enriched our movie-going experience, we hope to create an evening of fun and joy. And that includes the filmmakers and actors who take risks and stimulate us with provocative subjects and daring characters. They are all heroes in the cinematic landscape." To coincide with the theme, AMPAS presented an exhibition in the lobby of its Beverly Hills headquarters titled "The Oscars Celebrate Movie Heroes". The exhibit featured posters, photographs, and artifacts from 70 different films featuring literary, comic book, and real life heroes. Furthermore, actor Andrew Garfield, who portrayed the titular character in The Amazing Spider-Man, was scheduled to appear onstage with five-year-old cancer survivor Miles "Batkid" Scott with Garfield christening Scott as an "official superhero". The segment was scrapped, however, due to time constraints.

Several other people were involved with the telecast and its promotion. Tony Award-winning art director Derek McLane designed a new set and stage design for the show. Rob Ashford was involved as a choreographer. Filmmaker Paul Feig produced and directed a one-minute trailer promoting the event featuring DeGeneres and 250 dancers dancing and lip-synching to the song "The Walker" by rock band Fitz and the Tantrums. During the ceremony, actor Channing Tatum introduced a group called "Team Oscar". The team consisted of six young film students from colleges across the country selected by AMPAS whose role was to deliver Oscar statuettes to the presenters during the gala. Television personality and former Miss USA titleholder Rachel Smith hosted "Inside the Oscars", a behind-the-scenes video blog on the Oscar ceremony website.

In December 2013, AMPAS unveiled a new brand identity for the organization and the Academy Awards by local firm 180LA; the Academy Awards' new logo formalizes the prior year's rebranding of the ceremony as The Oscars, using a wordmark with a stylized letter "A" resembling a spotlight shining on an Oscar statuette (a similar effect is used in the Academy's new logo, but instead using a filled triangle).

=== Box office performance of nominated films ===
At the time of the nominations announcement on January 16, 2014, the combined gross of the nine Best Picture nominees at the American and Canadian box offices was $645 million, with an average of $72 million per film. When the nominations were revealed, Gravity was the highest-grossing film among the Best Picture nominees with $256 million in domestic box office receipts. Captain Phillips was the second-highest-grossing film with $105.5 million; this was followed by American Hustle ($105.4 million), The Wolf of Wall Street ($80.7 million), 12 Years a Slave ($39 million), Philomena ($22.3 million), Dallas Buyers Club ($16.8 million), Her ($9.9 million), and finally Nebraska ($8.5 million).

Of the top 50 grossing movies of the year, 47 nominations went to 14 films on the list. Only Frozen (1st), Despicable Me 2 (3rd), Gravity (7th), The Croods (14th), Captain Phillips (29th), American Hustle (30th), and The Wolf of Wall Street (42nd) were nominated for Best Picture, Best Animated Feature or any of the directing, acting or screenwriting awards. The other top 50 box office hits that earned nominations were Iron Man 3 (2nd), The Hobbit: The Desolation of Smaug (8th), Star Trek Into Darkness (11th), The Great Gatsby (17th), Jackass Presents: Bad Grandpa (31st), The Lone Ranger (38th), and Saving Mr. Banks (48th).

=== DeGeneres' Oscar selfie ===
Prior to the introduction of the Academy Awards for Technical Achievement montage, DeGeneres and several ceremony attendees such as Bradley Cooper, Jared Leto, Jennifer Lawrence, Julia Roberts, Kevin Spacey, Meryl Streep, Angelina Jolie, Brad Pitt, Channing Tatum, Lupita Nyong'o, and Peter Nyong'o (Lupita's brother) participated in a group selfie. The resulting tweet initially disabled the site and was eventually retweeted on Twitter over 3.4 million times. It surpassed the previous record retweet of Barack and Michelle Obama's post-election hug photo, which had been retweeted 778,000 times, in just 35 minutes. The selfie was taken with a Samsung Galaxy Note 3, provided by the company as part of a $20 million marketing campaign.

=== "Adele Dazeem" incident ===
While introducing the performance of "Let It Go" from Frozen, actor John Travolta accidentally mispronounced singer Idina Menzel's name as "Adele Dazeem". As a result, Travolta became the subject of mockery and ridicule in the media. According to a source for E!, Menzel revealed that she was not upset about the mishap. Afterwards, Menzel reportedly printed up satirical playbills that promoted her name as Adele Dazeem, noting her past work in Nert (Rent), Wicked-ly (Wicked) and Farfignugen (Frozen). Three days after the ceremony, Travolta publicly apologized to Menzel for mispronouncing her name. The following year, Menzel and Travolta appeared onstage together as award presenters, with the former introducing the latter as "Glom Gazingo".

In a Vanity Fair retrospective of Frozen in 2023, Menzel said of Travolta's gaffe: "Ultimately, it was one of the best things that’s happened in my career."

=== Critical reviews ===
The show received a mixed reception from media publications. Some media outlets were more critical of the show. Pittsburgh Post-Gazette television critic Rob Owen wrote, "Ms. DeGeneres brought predictable respectability to Sunday's 86th Academy Awards. Too bad this particular brand of predictable respectability was a bore." He also criticized the clip packages saluting movie heroes as "big a waste of time as Oscar montages almost always are." Columnist Alan Sepinwall of HitFix commented, "It was a long, disjointed ceremony, and what was fun and likely to endure came entirely from the winners and their speeches." He went on to say that many of DeGeneres's stunts fell flat and that The Wizard of Oz 75th anniversary tribute "felt much too random." Tim Goodman of The Hollywood Reporter said, "It was a turgid affair, badly directed, poorly produced and featuring an endless string of either tired or wince-inducing moments by DeGeneres, who, by the last 30 or so minutes, seemed to have given up entirely." In addition, he noted that the show was overstuffed with montages and stunts that dragged down the pacing of the telecast.

Other media outlets received the broadcast more positively. Television critic Matt Roush of TV Guide commented that DeGeneres "made the Oscars' inevitable dull patches felt less painful than usual." He also praised the cast and several musical numbers from the show. Frazier Moore of the Associated Press lauded DeGeneres's performance writing that, "She seemed to be committed to an unspoken theme for the evening: Humanize Hollywood's glitterati for the viewers. In return, the stars were on their best behavior." He concluded, "All in all, a sleek show was the Oscarcast. Few bombshells, fewer embarrassments, from fade-in to fade-out." Entertainment editor Marlow Stern of The Daily Beast raved, "DeGeneres followed in the footsteps of the most successful awards show hosts—Billy Crystal, the duo of Fey & Poehler, etc.—who have taken advantage of the audience, engaging in gleeful interactions with the plethora of A-listers there (when they're not mocking them)."

=== Ratings and reception ===
The American telecast on ABC drew in an average of 43.74 million people over its length, which was a 6% increase from the previous year's ceremony. An estimated 72 million total viewers watched all or part of the awards. The show also earned higher Nielsen ratings compared to the previous telecast with 24.7% of households watching over a 38 share. In addition, the program scored a higher 18-49 demo rating with a 13.3 rating over a 33 share among viewers in that demographic. It was the highest-rated Oscars telecast since the 72nd ceremony held in 2000 and the highest-rated non-sport program in American television since "The Last One", the series finale of Friends, which aired in May 2004.

In July 2014, the ceremony presentation received eight nominations for the 66th Primetime Emmys. The following month, the ceremony won one of those nominations for Outstanding Art Direction for a Variety, Nonfiction, Reality, or Reality-Competition Program (Derek McLane, Joe Celli, and Gloria Lamb).

== "In Memoriam" ==
The annual "In Memoriam" tribute was presented by actress Glenn Close. The montage featured an excerpt of the main title from Somewhere in Time by composer John Barry. At the conclusion of the tribute, singer Bette Midler performed her song "Wind Beneath My Wings" from the film Beaches. Before "In Memoriam" and while co-presenting Best Cinematography, Bill Murray paid an additional tribute to Harold Ramis. After co-presenter Amy Adams presented the nominees, Murray ad-libbed "Oh, we forgot one. Harold Ramis for Caddyshack, Ghostbusters and Groundhog Day."

The annual "In Memoriam" tribute honored the following individuals.

- James Gandolfini - Actor
- Karen Black - Actress
- Tom Laughlin - Actor, director, writer
- Ruth Prawer Jhabvala - Writer
- Carmen Zapata - Actress
- Hal Needham - Director, stunt coordinator
- Richard Shepherd - Producer, executive
- Stuart Freeborn - Makeup artist
- Gerry Hambling - Film editor
- Jim Kelly - Actor, martial artist
- Stephenie McMillan - Set decorator
- Les Blank - Documentarian
- Eileen Brennan - Actress
- Paul Walker - Actor
- Fay Kanin - Writer, Academy president 1979–1983
- Charles L. Campbell - Sound editor
- Deanna Durbin - Actress
- Frédéric Back - Animator
- A. C. Lyles - Producer
- Elmore Leonard - Writer
- Annette Funicello - Actress
- Petro Vlahos - Visual effects, inventor
- Eduardo Coutinho - Documentarian
- Saul Zaentz - Producer
- Riz Ortolani - Composer
- Peter O'Toole - Actor
- Ray Harryhausen - Visual effects
- Brian Ackland-Snow - Production designer
- Richard Griffiths - Actor
- Sid Caesar - Actor
- Roger Ebert - Critic
- Shirley Temple Black - Actress
- Joan Fontaine - Actress
- Run Run Shaw - Producer, executive
- Juanita Moore - Actress
- Mickey Moore - 2nd unit director
- Stefan Kudelski - Inventor
- Harold Ramis - Director, writer, actor
- Eleanor Parker - Actress
- Ray Dolby - Inventor, engineer
- Julie Harris - Actress
- Maximilian Schell - Actor
- Richard Matheson - Writer
- Gilbert Taylor - Cinematographer
- Tom Sherak - Executive, Academy president 2009–2012
- Esther Williams - Actress
- Philip Seymour Hoffman - Actor

Shortly after Midler finished singing, camera assistant Sarah Jones, who died more than a week prior to the ceremony, was briefly mentioned before the commercial break.

== See also ==
- 20th Screen Actors Guild Awards
- 34th Golden Raspberry Awards
- 56th Grammy Awards
- 66th Primetime Emmy Awards
- 67th British Academy Film Awards
- 68th Tony Awards
- 71st Golden Globe Awards
- List of submissions to the 86th Academy Awards for Best Foreign Language Film
