= Caroff =

Caroff and Karoff are surnames. Notable people with these surnames include:

Caroff

- André Caroff (1924–2009), French author of science fiction and horror
- Joe Caroff (1921–2025), American graphic designer

Karoff

- Jeffrey Karoff (born 1954), American documentary filmmaker
- Peter Karoff (1937–2017), American nonprofit executive

== See also ==
- Karov, a Bulgarian surname
