= Karov =

Karov (Bulgarian: Каров) is a Bulgarian masculine surname, its feminine counterpart is Karova. It may refer to the following notable people:

- Anelia Karova (born 1989), Bulgarian table tennis player
- Dimitar Karov (born 1943), Bulgarian volleyball player
- Shmuel of Karov (1735–1820), Polish Hasidic rebbe

== See also ==
- Caroff, Karoff
