= Blagsnarst, a Love Story =

- American Dad! episode
- Episode no.: Season 11; Episode 3
- Directed by: Chris Bennett
- Written by: Wes Lukey
- Production code: 8AJN22
- Original air date: September 21, 2014

Guest appearances
- Kim Kardashian as Qurchhhh/herself; Paul Reubens as Wyatt Borden

Episode chronology
← Previous "A Boy Named Michael"	Next → "Blonde Ambition"
- American Dad! season 11

"Blagsnarst, a Love Story" is the third episode and season finale of the eleventh season of American Dad!, and the 175th episode overall. The episode aired on September 21, 2014, and is the final show to air on Fox's first Animation Domination lineup before its revival, as well as the final episode of the series to be aired on Fox as the show moved to TBS from the twelfth season to the twenty-first season, which started a month later in October 2014. The episode was written by Wes Lukey and directed by series regular Chris Bennett.

== Plot ==
On the way to work, Stan Smith (Seth MacFarlane) gets annoyed by Roger's surprise entrance, lack of disguise and clinginess which affects the entire family. Accompanying Francine on a trip to the mall, Roger picks up a pheromone trail and follows it until he finds a crashed spaceship with a female alien (Kim Kardashian) who was also attracted by his scent.

They take her home to meet Stan, who becomes afraid that the CIA will discover her. Even as he worries, the CIA is conducting an investigation of her crash site. Roger and the alien become sexually attracted to each other which distresses the entire family. But after their fling, Roger is ready to dump her only to find she is ready to settle down with him. Roger tries to claim he already has a girlfriend but the ruse fails. Despite her insistence that Roger make things work, he decides to take her into the countryside.

Pulling over at a gas station, Roger calls the CIA to turn her over at a bed and breakfast for them. Stan gets word of the CIA on their trail and he admits that he called them as they can be heard approaching. Stan points out that she can lead them back to the family and Roger takes her away and proposes they go their separate ways. Handing her cash, he leaves her behind as Bullock spots her dog disguise from a helicopter and attempts to intercept her after it falls off as Roger cheers her on. But when the CIA corners her, he decides to intervene by building a high-powered rifle out of stones, sticks and his bubble gum. He manages to shoot down a tree which crashes onto the copter. As they leave together, she continues with her future plans together until Roger bails out of the car and it crashes in flames. The female alien crawls out as the fire burns off her fur, revealing a curvy woman in a fur bikini who walks away from the wreckage. The episodes ends with the reveal that the entire story (and the series on FOX) is found in a book Stan is reading from, ending with how Kim Kardashian was born.

Meanwhile, in prison, Marylin Thacker is executed for the murder of her husband. Her son returns to the family home in sadness as he prepares for an election as attorney general. As his son is hit by a car outside, he discovers a secret hiding place under the floorboards containing The Golden Turd. Ignoring everything else in his life, he calls Wyatt Borden (voiced by Paul Reubens), a wealthy chemical dumper that pledges to help him and even make him president one day.

== Production ==
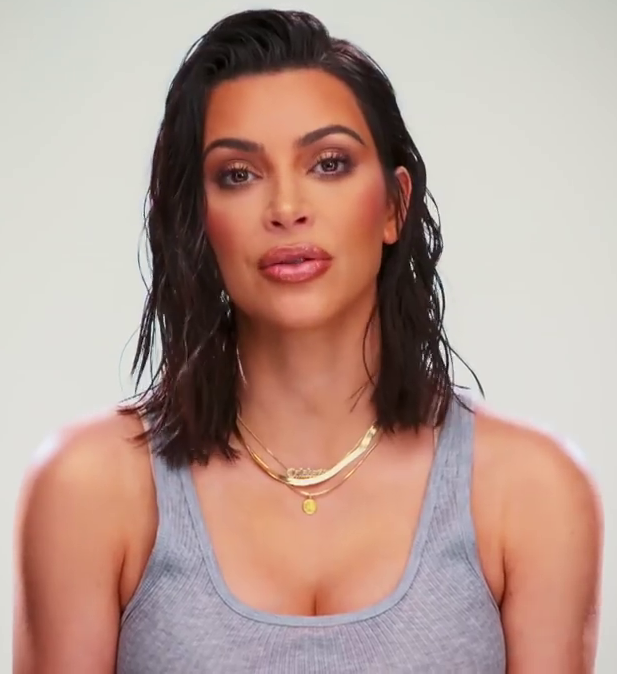
Kim Kardashian (pictured) guest starred in this episode as Qurchhhh; a love interest for Roger the alien

In September 2013, it was revealed that Kim Kardashian would appear in an upcoming episode as a "love interest" for Roger.

== Reception ==
"Blagsnarst, a Love Story" first aired on Fox in the United States on September 21, 2014. Drawing 3.03 million viewers and a 1.5 rating in the 18-49 demographic, this episode would become the highest-rated episode of the season. This was the final episode of American Dad! aired on Fox as part of the Animation Domination block until 2026; the show was quietly cancelled by Fox but was picked up by TBS for season 12.

Critical reception for "Blagsnarst, a Love Story" was mostly positive. Alasdair Wilkins of The A.V. Club gave this episode an A− stating: "The episode features Kim Kardashian, a move that should feel like shameless stunt-casting, except she’s on hand to play a furry pink alien; this is in keeping with American Dad’s admirable habit of reeling in impressive guest voices and casting them in unrecognizable roles. The episode features Roger and Stan at their most casually sociopathic, yet both find just enough hidden emotional depth for the episode to not feel completely mean-spirited."

On TV.com, the episode has a rating of 8.3 out of 10, based on 34 votes.

On IMDb.com, the episode has a rating of 7/10 based on 752 votes.
