= Geof Bartz =

American documentary film editor (born 1943)

- Born: December 3, 1943 (age 82)
- Education: Columbia University (MFA)
- Occupations: Documentary film editor, producer, educator
- Spouse: Lynn Sullivan

Geof Bartz (born December 3, 1943) is an American documentary film editor, producer, and educator noted for his work on Pumping Iron. He has edited four films that have won Academy Awards.

== Life and career ==
Bartz grew up in Detroit, Michigan. He attended the University of Notre Dame where he majored in biology before discovering film. After graduating, he went to Columbia University where he received an M.F.A. in film and later became an adjunct professor.

Bartz has edited or supervised the editing of more than 100 non-fiction films, including the documentary Pumping Iron.

He has edited four Academy Award-winning films: King Gimp, Big Mama, Crisis Hotline: Veterans Press 1, and A Girl in the River: The Price of Forgiveness. Three other movies he cut received Academy Award nominations: Lenny Bruce: Swear to Tell the Truth, Poster Girl, and Prison Terminal. He has also won four Emmys.

Bartz is a member of the Academy of Motion Picture Arts and Science and American Cinema Editors (ACE).

He has been the Supervising Editor for HBO Documentary Films since 1998.

== Personal life ==
He lives on Manhattan's Upper West Side and in East Hampton, NY with his wife, Lynn Sullivan. Their daughter Juliet Bartz is a journalist at Axios.
