= Ra Paulette =

American architect

- Born: August 1940 (age 85); Indiana
- Known for: Cave sculpture

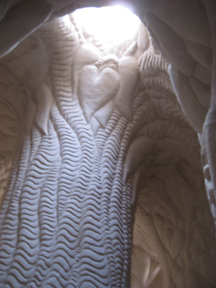
Sculpture entitled Tree Cave by Paulette.

Ra Paulette is an American cave sculptor based in New Mexico who digs into hillsides to sculpt elaborate artistic spaces inside mountains. Since he began sculpting in 1990, he has dug over a dozen caves in New Mexico.

Reviewer Martha Mendoza in the Los Angeles Times described the caves he created as shrines, as hallowed places, a "sanctuary for prayer and meditation" while others describe the caves as works of art. The caves are finished with "scallops, molded curves, smooth ledges, inlaid stones, narrow pods and crusty ledges." His caves attract visitors worldwide.

Paulette is self-taught; he never studied architecture, sculpting or structural engineering in a formal school. He works with hand tools only, such as shovels, pick axes, and scrapers. According to one source, he requested to be paid only $12 per hour for his labour for one of his caves. Paulette grew up in northwest Indiana along the shores of Lake Michigan.

Paulette created Windows of the Earth Shrine near the Black Mesa in northern New Mexico for a resort north of Santa Fe. The current resort and retreat center, Origin at Rancho de San Juan, provides the public with the opportunity to view and visit the cave sanctuary on guided, docent led tours, by appointment. "The current owner is passionate about preserving and maintaining this treasure for many generations to come....The original resort owners commissioned an artist, Ra Paulette, to open the interior of the natural butte...." The shrine took Paulette two and a half years to complete. Paulette's sculpture was the subject of an Academy Award-nominated 2014 documentary entitled Cavedigger, directed by Jeffrey Karoff.

In 2014, Paulette described his artistic approach:

It has a lot to do with the juxtaposition of opposites: the sense of being underground with the light streaming in; the intimacy of being in a cave, yet the columns end up very large, sometimes thirty to forty feet high.

— Paulette in an interview, 2014

== See also ==
- Cavedigger, an Academy Award-nominated documentary about Paulette's sculpture
