= American Dad! season 11 =

American Dad!
- Season 11
- Digital purchase image for volume ten, which features the entire eleventh season.
- Starring: Seth MacFarlane; Wendy Schaal; Scott Grimes; Rachael MacFarlane; Dee Bradley Baker
- No. of episodes: 3

Release
- Original network: Fox
- Original release: September 14 – September 21, 2014

Season chronology
- ← Previous; Season 10 Next → Season 12

The eleventh season of the American TV series American Dad! originally aired on Fox from September 14, 2014, to September 21, 2014, and consisted of three episodes, making it the shortest season to date. The first two episodes aired on September 14, 2014, and the third episode on September 21, 2014. This was the last season to air on Fox; one month later, TBS premiered the twelfth season on October 20, 2014.

Guest voice actors for the show's 11th season include Jane Krakowski, Paul Reubens, and Kim Kardashian.

== Production ==
On July 16, 2013, it was announced that American Dad! had been cancelled by Fox. Soon after, cable network TBS would announce that it had picked up the show for a 15-episode 11th season, slated to premiere on October 20, 2014.

The tenth season was initially the final one on Fox; however, on July 20, 2014, it was announced that Fox had three unaired episodes left for broadcast. Reports from Fox seemed to imply that these three episodes constituted a season of their own. Among multiple discrepant reports from TBS, one indicated that the three episodes were the beginning of the 11th season to resume on their network. On DVD and Hulu, these episodes appear as the first three episodes of season 12.

== Episodes ==
No. overall	No. in season	Title	Directed by	Written by	Original release date	Prod. code	U.S. viewers (millions)
173	1	"Roger Passes the Bar"	Josue Cervantes	Charles Suozzi	September 14, 2014	8AJN21	2.62
When the stress of running an attic bar gives Roger a heart attack, he decides to sell it, but the bar is turned into a TGIFridays-style family restaurant where the unglamorous dive bar atmosphere is toned down significantly. Meanwhile, Steve and his friends do chores for a sexy woman (voiced by Jane Krakowski) who was recently registered as a sex offender for lewd conduct with underaged boys.
174	2	"A Boy Named Michael"	Joe Daniello	Erik Richter	September 14, 2014	8AJN17	2.66
Roger moves in with Greg and Terry as their adopted Russian son "Michael" after growing tired of the Smiths not being sophisticated. Meanwhile, Stan orders a La-Z-Boy and slowly becomes white trash to annoy Roger while he's living with the Corbin/Bates.
175	3	"Blagsnarst, a Love Story"	Chris Bennett	Wes Lukey	September 21, 2014	8AJN22	3.03
A furry pink female alien (Kim Kardashian) is discovered in the woods by Francine and Roger, who begins a relationship with her, but quickly tires of her many quirks and eccentricities after having a one-night stand. Meanwhile, the Golden Turd saga continues when an up-and-coming attorney general's mother is sentenced to lethal injection and his discovery of the cursed treasure leads him to make a deal with an oil company executive (Paul Reubens) who wants to help him further his political career.
