= Peter Karoff =

American nonprofit executive

Peter Karoff (May 6, 1937 – March 9, 2017) was chairman and founder of The Philanthropic Initiative (TPI) a nonprofit organization founded in 1989 that promotes philanthropy. TPI designs, manages, and evaluates philanthropic programs for individuals, families, corporations, and foundations.

Karoff was President of TPI from 1989 to 2002. For 25 years, prior to founding TPI, Karoff was in the insurance and real estate businesses. He has been on the board of more than 30 nonprofit organizations, including the Massachusetts Association of Mental Health, Roxbury Development Corporation, the New England Foundation for the Arts, Massachusetts Business Roundtable, and Business Executives for National Security, and he was on the board of Blackside Productions, the producer of the PBS series Eyes on the Prize. Further board affiliations in addition to TPI included: Management Sciences for Health, the Gerald and Henrietta Rauenhorst Foundation, Robina Foundation, Elm Foundation, Mediators Foundation, WGBH Educational Foundation, Boston University's Institute for Nonprofit Management and Leadership, the National Leadership Council of the Association of American Colleges and Universities, and the Tisch College of Citizenship and Public Service at Tufts University, where he also served as a Senior Fellow.

Karoff has been widely quoted in the press including U.S. News & World Report, Newsweek, Time Magazine, Barron's, Business Week, Forbes, The New York Times, The Boston Globe, The Washington Post, Variety, the Associated Press, Discover, The Chronicle of Philanthropy, Fast Company and Fortune. Karoff has appeared on NBC Nightly News, the CBS Evening News, and the PBS NewsHour, as well as local television and radio programs.

Karoff frequently spoke and wrote on philanthropic and social issues, and his book The World We Want–new dimensions in philanthropy and social change (AltaMira Press) was published in 2007. He was the editor of Just Money–A Critique of Contemporary American Philanthropy (TPI Editions - 2004). Karoff's poetry has been published and anthologized. A graduate of Brandeis University (1959), Karoff earned an MFA from Columbia University (1988) and received an honorary Doctor of Humane Letters from Lesley University (2002). He was made a Fellow of the MacDowell Colony in 1989 and in 2006 became a Purpose Prize Fellow.
