= Prison Terminal: The Last Days of Private Jack Hall =

- Directed by: Edgar Barens
- Produced by: Edgar Barens
- Edited by: Geof Bartz and Gladys Mae Murphy
- Music by: Max Richter
- Distributed by: The Cinema Guild
- Release date: 2013
- Running time: 40 minutes

Prison Terminal: The Last Days of Private Jack Hall is a 2013 documentary film by Edgar Barens.

== Synopsis ==
This film tells the story of Jack Hall, a terminally ill octogenarian lifer at Iowa State Penitentiary. The film looks at the last six months of Jack's life and the creation of a hospice run by other inmates serving life sentences. The film is a no-nonsense look at the aging population in America's prisons and how one group helps prisoners die with dignity.

== Awards ==
Awards
Award	Date of ceremony	Category	Recipients and nominees	Result
Academy Award	March 2, 2014	Best Short Subject Documentary	Edgar Barens	Nominated
