= Cavedigger =

- Directed by: Jeffrey Karoff
- Produced by: Jeffrey Karoff
- Cinematography: Anghel Decca
- Edited by: Erin Nordstrom
- Music by: Peter Min
- Distributed by: Journeyman Pictures
- Release date: January 2013
- Running time: 39 minutes

Cavedigger is a 2013 documentary film by Jeffrey Karoff.

== Synopsis ==
This film is the story of Ra Paulette, a man who obsessively digs massive, ornately carved, sandstone caves in Northern New Mexico as art. These works are commissioned by patrons, who envision smaller scale projects, but Paulette often take years to finish, and artistic conflict ensues over money and the scope of the project. All of his caves are created by using just hand tools. The story is the classic battle of how one knows when an artistic project is finished. At the end of the film, we see Paulette start his magnum opus, a cave he expects to take the last 10 years of his life, on unauthorized land, and in secret. The public can book a docent-led tour by appointment, to "The Windows of the Earth" cave sanctuary -featured in the Cave Digger documentary. The resort and retreat venue, Origin at Rancho de San Juan, allows for the only opportunity for public viewing of one this man's amazing "land art" creations.

== Awards ==
Awards
| Award | Date of ceremony | Category | Recipients and nominees | Result |
|---|---|---|---|---|
| Academy Award | March 2, 2014 | Best Short Subject Documentary | Jeffrey Karoff | Nominated |
