= Jeffrey Karoff =

Filmmaker

Jeffrey Karoff (born 6 September 1954) is a film maker.

Karoff was nominated at the 86th Academy Awards for Academy Award for Best Documentary (Short Subject) for the 2013 film CaveDigger.
