= Edgar Barens =

American documentary film maker

Edgar Barens (born 1960) is an American documentary film maker. Barens is nominated for an Academy Award for Best Documentary (Short Subject) for the 2013 film Prison Terminal: The Last Days of Private Jack Hall.
