= Blonde Ambition (American Dad!) =

- American Dad! episode
- Episode no.: Season 12; Episode 1
- Directed by: Rodney Clouden
- Story by: Mike Barker, (Note: Credited as Wayne Dublin) Carlo Hart & Evan Sandman
- Teleplay by: Evan Sandman & Carlo Hart
- Production code: 9AJN01
- Original air date: October 20, 2014

Episode chronology
← Previous "Blagsnarst, a Love Story"	Next → "CIAPOW"
- American Dad! season 12

"Blonde Ambition" is the season premiere of the twelfth season of American Dad!, and the 176th episode overall. The episode aired as the TBS series premiere on October 20, 2014, which was last up until March 2025. The episode is written by Evan Sandman and Carlo Hart, both of which also were given a story credit along with Mike Barker.

== Plot ==
Hayley goes blonde so she can be taken more seriously in her activist endeavors. Meanwhile, Stan and Steve's search for a new home takes a dangerous turn when guard dogs attempt to capture them.

== Production ==
American Dad!'s 11th season was the last to be produced for Fox prior its cancellation. In July 2013, TBS announced it had picked up the series for a 12th season. TBS had aired reruns of American Dad! in syndication during its run on Fox. Series co-creator and showrunner Mike Barker said about show's upcoming network relocation, "It's going to be the same American Dad!, just in a different place." However, Barker departed the series over creative differences once early production for season 12 commenced in November 2013. Barker had made contributions to the episode, but as a result of exiting the series early in production, he was given story credit under a different name as Wayne Dublin.

== Reception ==
The episode reached 1.09 million viewers in its initial series premiere airing on TBS. The episode received mostly positive reviews. Daniel Kurland of Den of Geek praised its big network change from its Fox counterpart, and compared it favorably to Futurama and its Comedy Central revival series, as well as the other two American Dad! episodes "My Morning Straightjacket" and "Lost in Space". He was even surprised by time moment Hayley spouted out the word "shit" uncensored in a network premiere, as the first American Dad! character to ever do such. He also called it a massive improvement over its previous episode which was the final Fox episode that aired a month prior.
