= Laurent Witz =

Luxembourgian film maker

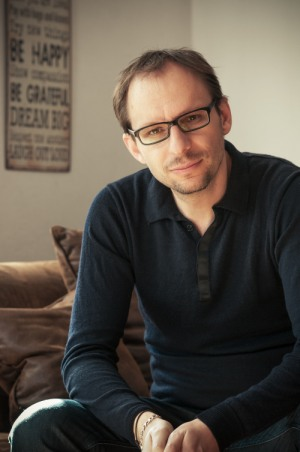
- Born: 21 November 1975 (age 49); Haguenau, France
- Occupation: Film maker

Laurent Witz (born 21 November 1975) is a French film maker. Witz and fellow producer Alexandre Espigares won an Academy Award for Best Animated Short Film for the 2013 film Mr Hublot at the 86th Academy Awards.

== Decorations ==
- Chevalier of the Order of Arts and Letters (2016)
