= Venom of the Red Lotus =

- The Legend of Korra episode
- The titular venom enters Korra's body.
- Episode no.: Season 3 Episode 13
- Directed by: Melchior Zwyer
- Written by: Joshua Hamilton; Tim Hedrick
- Production code: 213
- Original air date: August 22, 2014

Guest appearances
- Adrian LaTourelle as Unalaq; Jonathan Adams as Vaatu; Bruce Davison as Lord Zuko

Episode chronology
← Previous "Enter the Void"	Next → "After All These Years"
- The Legend of Korra season 3

"Venom of the Red Lotus" is the thirteenth and final episode of the third season of the American animated television series The Legend of Korra, a sequel to Avatar: The Last Airbender, and the 39th episode overall. The show follows Avatar Korra (Janet Varney), the only person capable of bending all four elements (water, earth, fire, and air), as she tries to maintain balance in the world, with this season focusing on her battle with The Red Lotus, led by Zaheer (Henry Rollins), as they intend to create an anarchist world free from government and the Avatar.

The episode was directed by Melchior Zwyer and written by Joshua Hamilton and Tim Hedrick, and follows the Red Lotus aiming to kill Korra while she is in the Avatar State so they can end the Avatar cycle. The episode originally aired on Nickelodeon's website on August 22, 2014, and received critical acclaim for its action sequences, animation and ending.

== Plot ==
In caves near the Northern Air Temple, Zaheer and the Red Lotus administer mercury poison to Korra seeking to let her enter the Avatar State for the last time in an effort to keep herself alive before killing her so that the Avatar reincarnation cycle will be broken. Jinora, using her spiritual projection abilities, overhears the plan and tells the rest of the airbenders who have been captured. The rest of Team Avatar follows Kai to a cave system where they find and rescue the airbenders. Korra's father Tonraq, Bolin and Mako go to search for Korra, who is resisting entering the Avatar State. As she resists, she sees her past enemies: Amon, Unalaq and Vaatu.

Eventually, Korra stops resisting and enters the Avatar State, however the Red Lotus find they have underrated Korra's power as she quickly escapes her chains. Zaheer flies from the caves and Korra chases after him, while Bolin fights Ghazan and Mako fights Ming-Hua. Korra uses her fire and earthbending to propel herself into a fight with Zaheer, while Tenzin reunites with his children and Tonraq begs the airbenders to help Korra. Inside the caves, Mako electrocutes Ming-Hua to death while Ghazan, refusing to go back to prison, uses lavabending to collapse the caves, killing himself. Bolin and Mako manage to escape the caves before they collapse.

As Korra's body becomes weak due to the poison, Zaheer gains the upper hand in the fight. As he is about to asphyxiate Korra, the airbenders create a giant tornado that pulls him the ground. Zaheer is captured and Suyin Beifong metalbends the poison out of Korra. Two weeks later, Korra is in a wheelchair and is being helped around by Asami Sato. Because the remaining poison is still in her body, she unable to access the Avatar State until the remaining poison is gone. President Raiko officially welcomes Korra back to Republic City after she defeated the Red Lotus terrorist attacks. She attends a ceremony where Tenzin makes Jinora an airbending master and he tasks the new Air Nation with continuing Korra's legacy in helping keep balance to the world. Korra watches this and lets out a single tear.

== Credits and production ==
The episode was directed by Melchior Zwyer and written by Joshua Hamilton and Tim Hedrick.

=== Main cast members ===
- Janet Varney as Avatar Korra
- David Faustino as Mako
- Seychelle Gabriel as Asami Sato
- P. J. Byrne as Bolin
- J. K. Simmons as Tenzin
- James Remar as Tonraq
- Mindy Sterling as Lin Beifong
- Anne Heche as Suyin Beifong
- Skyler Brigmann as Kai
- Dee Bradley Baker as hybrid creatures
- Jeff Bennett as radio broadcaster

=== Guest stars ===
- Richard Riehle as Bumi
- Logan Wells as Meelo
- Darcy Rose Byrnes as Ikki
- Kiernan Shipka as Jinora
- Adrian LaTourelle as Unalaq
- Spencer Garrett as President Raiko
- Jonathan Adams as Vaatu
- Bruce Davison as Lord Zuko
- Grey DeLisle as Ming-Hua
- Peter Giles as Ghazan
- Maria Bamford as Pema
- Steve Blum as Amon
- Alyson Stoner as Opal
- Jim Meskimen as Daw

The idea of restraining the Avatar in X-shaped chains, as seen in this episode, was originally conceived for the scene of Aang being captured by the Fire Nation in the first season of Avatar, but was then vetoed by the network. It was allowed this time, according to Bryan Konietzko, after he complained about seeing a shot of SpongeBob SquarePants, another Nickelodeon character, similarly restrained.

== Reception ==
The episode received critical acclaim from critics and fans and is considered one of the best episodes of the series.

Oliver Sava of The A.V. Club stated that "The power on display in the final Korra/Zaheer fight is breathtaking, and director Mel Zwyer does phenomenal work capturing the full impact of the fight. The standout moment is an extended single shot following the two fighters as they exchange blows while navigating through the air, creating a disorienting sense of weightlessness as the camera gets swept up in their gravity-defying movement." Max Nicholson of IGN gave the episode a score of 9.5 out of 10, writing that "The Legend of Korra's Book Three finale ended on a solemn note, following an action-packed and climactic showdown" and "The final confrontation between Korra and Zaheer, for example, was gorgeously animated and scored but also very raw and personal. Meanwhile, the Bending Brothers' fight against Ming-Hua and Ghazan brought its own thrills."

Leo Noboru Lima of Slash Film wrote that "No other half-hour in the show's history packs so much gripping action, grand drama, character progression, visual splendor, and seismic narrative development into its running time; it's the kind of dizzying, mind-blowing, expletive-inspiring Great TV that shows like "Game of Thrones" and "Lost" offered at their best." Michael Mammano of Den of Geek gave the episode a score of 5 stars out of 5, stating that "This finale succeeded in so many ways..." and praised the character arcs of the season that were further developed or concluded in the episode saying "Korra and Asami’s friendship, Lin and Su’s family history, the return of the Air Nation and Tenzin’s coping with how his culture will inevitably change, Jinora’s coming of age, Kai gaining a sense of community and responsibility, Bolin learning to be himself both in regards to how he approaches girls and how his bending will evolve… there was so much going on, and it was great!"
