= Mr Hublot =

- Theatrical movie poster
- Directed by: Laurent Witz; Alexandre Espigares
- Written by: Laurent Witz
- Produced by: ZEILT Productions; Watt Frame
- Music by: François Rousselot
- Release date: 15 October 2013 (Warsaw Film Festival)
- Running time: 11 minutes
- Countries: Luxembourg; France
- Language: English

Mr Hublot (English: /uːbloʊ/, French: [yblo]) is a Luxembourgish-French animated short film by Laurent Witz and Alexandre Espigares with characters created by Stephane Halleux. It won the Academy Award for Best Animated Short Film at the 86th Academy Awards on 2 March 2014.

== Plot ==
Mr. Hublot is a man who lives in a tiny apartment located in a crowded steampunk city. He wears several layers of eyewear and has an odometer-like counter in his forehead which runs forward and backward. Mr. Hublot also displays several OCD symptoms, such as turning the lights on and off several times before leaving the living room and meticulously straightening the pictures on his wall.

Mr. Hublot sees a tiny puppy-like robot shivering in a box. When the box is taken away for garbage disposal, Mr. Hublot, concerned for the puppy's welfare, takes the robot to his house.

The robot gets bigger and bigger and is soon much bigger than Mr. Hublot. After the creature causes extensive damage to the apartment, Mr. Hublot appears to attack the creature, which seems suddenly frightened, with a screwdriver.

After some time has passed, Mr. Hublot is shown in his home, with everything returned to normal. To the surprise of the audience, it is revealed that, far from destroying the creature, Mr. Hublot has instead moved from his tiny apartment to the warehouse across the street so that he could accommodate his oversized pet. They both seem happy and Mr. Hublot continues to turn the lights on and off before leaving the room.

== Music ==
Mr. Hublot original music "Robotpet" and "Mr.Hublot" performed by Li-lo.

== Accolades ==
Award	Date of ceremony	Category	Nominee(s)	Result	Ref.
Academy Award	2 March 2014	Best Animated Short Film	Laurent Witz and Alexandre Espigares	Won	
