= Alexandre Espigares =

Spanish-Luxembourgish film maker

Alexandre Espigares is a Spanish-Luxembourgish Academy Award-winning film maker.

Espigares and fellow director and producer Laurent Witz received an Academy Award for Best Animated Short Film for the 2013 film Mr Hublot.

Espigares directed the 2018 animated film White Fang.
