= American Dad! season 12 =

American Dad!
- Season 12
- Region 1 cover art for "Volume 11"
- Starring: Seth MacFarlane; Wendy Schaal; Scott Grimes; Rachael MacFarlane; Dee Bradley Baker
- No. of episodes: 15

Release
- Original network: TBS
- Original release: October 20, 2014 – June 1, 2015

Season chronology
- ← Previous; Season 11 Next → Season 13

The twelfth season of American Dad! first aired on TBS in fifteen episodes from October 20, 2014, to June 1, 2015. It premiered with the episode "Blonde Ambition" and finished with "Seizures Suit Stanny". The series continues to focus on the eccentric upper middle class Smith family in a fictionalized version of Langley, Virginia and their six housemates: Father, husband, CIA agent, and Republican, Stan; his wife and housewife, Francine; their liberal, hippie, college-aged daughter, Hayley; their dorky high-school-aged son, Steve; the family's unusual goldfish, Klaus; and flamboyant, master of disguise alien, Roger.

Season twelve was the first to air on the cable channel TBS, since moving from its former home on Fox. The season premiere was given a two-day preview ahead of its linear debut, being uploaded to YouTube and Facebook on October 13, 2014.

Guest voice actors for the show's 12th season include Kathy Bates, Kristin Chenoweth, Ted Danson, Will Forte, Stephen Fry, Josh Groban, Stan Lee, Kate Mulgrew, Dean Norris, Carl Reiner, Mickey Rooney in his final television appearance, Sinbad, Mark Spitz, Patrick Stewart, Uma Thurman, and Robert Wuhl.

== Production ==
American Dad!'s 11th season was the last to be produced for Fox prior its cancellation. In July 2013, TBS announced it had picked up the series for a 12th season. TBS had aired reruns of American Dad! in syndication during its run on Fox. Series co-creator and showrunner Mike Barker said about show's upcoming network relocation, "It's going to be the same American Dad!, just in a different place." However, Barker departed the series over creative differences once early production for season 12 commenced in November 2013.

== Episodes ==
No. overall	No. in season	Title	Directed by	Written by	Original release date	Prod. code	U.S. viewers (millions)
176	1	"Blonde Ambition"	Rodney Clouden	Story by : Evan Sandman & Carlo Hart; Teleplay by : Mike Barker, (Note: Credited as Wayne Dublin) Carlo Hart & Evan Sandman	October 20, 2014	9AJN01	1.09
Hayley goes blonde so she can be taken more seriously in her activist endeavors. Meanwhile, Stan and Steve's search for a new home takes a dangerous turn when guard dogs attempt to capture them.
177	2	"CIAPOW"	Jansen Yee	Joe Chandler & Nic Wegener	October 27, 2014	9AJN02	1.15
Stan sets out to prove that man is better than machine when a military drone takes his job and he and his coworkers end up kidnapped in Thailand after trying to steal the dictator's asthma inhaler. Meanwhile, Francine and the rest of the family compete in a slow-motion race.
178	3	"Scents and Sensei-bility"	Tim Parsons & Jennifer Graves	Mike Barker, Carlo Hart & Evan Sandman	November 3, 2014	9AJN05	1.22
Snot and Steve enroll in a karate class after getting fed up of being bullied, but when Snot later gets brainwashed by the sensei, Steve must come to the rescue. Meanwhile, Klaus becomes an outside pet when he gets a smelly odor.
179	4	"Big Stan on Campus"	Pam Cooke & Valerie Fletcher	Brian Boyle	November 10, 2014	9AJN04	1.16
When the CIA lets Stan go due to budget cuts, Stan takes a job as a college security guard at Groff Community College, where the student body loves him...until a noise disturbance call makes him their enemy, and his attempts to repair his relation makes things worse. Meanwhile, Roger turns the Smith house into a bed and breakfast and do everything they can to make their eccentric guest (voiced by Stephen Fry) comfortable.
180	5	"Now and Gwen"	Chris Bennett	Rachael Bogert & Emily Wood	November 17, 2014	9AJN06	1.31
Hayley suspects that Gwen, Francine's sister, is up to no good when she comes to town. Meanwhile, Roger tries to find out the location of a treasure from a guy in a coma, Stan teaches Steve the art of hugging, and Klaus shadows Roger's dramatic comments.
181	6	"Dreaming of a White Porsche Christmas"	Shawn Murray	Brian Boyle	December 1, 2014	9AJN08	1.01
In a parody of It's a Wonderful Life, Stan wishes to have Principal Lewis' swinging bachelor life, but soon regrets the wish when he finds out that Francine is married to Principal Lewis in an alternate reality.
182	7	"LGBSteve"	Joe Daniello	Erik Richter	February 23, 2015	9AJN11	1.10
Steve has a gender identity crisis when Hayley convinces him to join an all-girls roller derby team with her and the other players believe Steve is more feminine than masculine. Meanwhile, Stan and Francine hire a magical repairman to fix the backyard, but everything he does makes them angry.
183	8	"Morning Mimosa"	Josue Cervantes	Ali Waller	March 2, 2015	9AJN07	1.14
Steve becomes a star chef after Francine refuses to cook for him after Steve drops an F-bomb at her and demonstrates his skills on a morning talk show for drunken, middle-aged women. Meanwhile, Stan thinks he can make people vanish by snapping his fingers.
184	9	"My Affair Lady"	Joe Daniello	Teresa Hsiao	March 9, 2015	9AJN03	1.14
Hayley considers having an affair with a married man when she gets a new job from the help of Roger, her new life coach. Meanwhile, Francine and Steve go to a mother-son dance and Stan ends up stealing Steve's date.
185	10	"A Star Is Reborn"	Rodney Clouden	Brett Cawley & Robert Maitia	March 16, 2015	9AJN09	1.10
Stan and Francine win a trip to Los Angeles, and Stan, disappointed that Hollywood isn't as glamorous as it used to be, is taken in by an old actress and her circle of old Hollywood friends who believe that Stan is the reincarnation of her comedy actor husband who died under mysterious circumstances. Meanwhile, Roger kennel-trains Steve and Hayley when Hayley reveals that she deleted one of his episodes of Bones from his DVR and Steve claims that Bones hasn't been good since season four.
186	11	"Manhattan Magical Murder Mystery Tour"	Jansen Yee	Kirk J. Rudell	March 23, 2015	9AJN10	1.02
The Smiths head to the Big Apple when Francine is nominated for an award for her housewife novella. Meanwhile, Stan and Hayley hang out with actor Robert Wuhl and Roger and Steve re-create their fictional partnership, Wheels and the Legman.
187	12	"The Shrink"	Pam Cooke & Valerie Fletcher	Brett Cawley & Robert Maitia	March 30, 2015	9AJN12	1.11
After witnessing a newlywed couple die in a taxi cab crash, Stan sees the CIA's psychologist over his survival guilt and ends up obsessed with miniature-building. Meanwhile, Roger and Klaus train to be world-class wine connoisseurs after embarrassing themselves at a wine tasting.
188	13	"Holy Shit, Jeff's Back!"	Tim Parsons & Jennifer Graves	Joe Chandler & Nic Wegener	May 18, 2015	9AJN13	1.17
Jeff makes his return from space after being abducted, but Hayley and Roger suspect that Jeff isn't who he seems to be. Meanwhile, Steve looks after Snot's hamster.
189	14	"American Fung"	Chris Bennett	Greg Cohen	May 25, 2015	9AJN14	0.91
Stan has Francine committed to a mental hospital to hide the fact that he once again forgot their wedding anniversary, only for her to be re-committed after throwing a fit -- all the while, the entire episode slowly turns into a propaganda piece that sings the praises of a Chinese billionaire who bought the episode from Seth MacFarlane.
190	15	"Seizures Suit Stanny"	Josue Cervantes	Erik Durbin	June 1, 2015	9AJN15	1.11
Stan's lie about having a seizure, (when he was really texting and driving), takes a turn for the worse when he is put on anti-seizure medication that changes him into a Frankenstein-like monster. Meanwhile, Roger helps Steve with his performance anxiety by taking him to the local pool.
