= List of accolades received by Gravity (2013 film) =

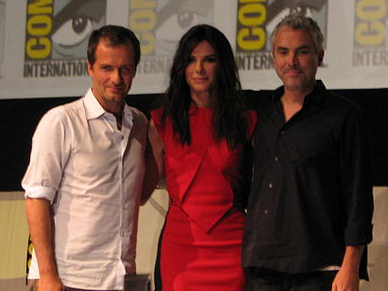
- From left: producer David Heyman, actress Sandra Bullock, and director Alfonso Cuarón at San Diego Comic-Con in 2013
Accolades
Award	Won	Nominated
AARP Annual Movies for Grownups Awards	1	1
Academy Awards	7	10
African-American Film Critics Association	1	1
Alliance of Women Film Journalists	4	10
American Cinema Editors	0	1
American Film Institute	1	1
American Society of Cinematographers	1	1
Art Directors Guild	1	1
Australian Academy of Cinema and Television Arts International Awards	2	3
Bodil Awards	0	1
Boston Society of Film Critics	1	1
British Academy Film Awards	6	11
César Awards	0	1
Chicago Film Critics Association	3	7
Cinema Audio Society Awards	1	1
Critics' Choice Movie Awards	7	10
Detroit Film Critics Society	1	2
Directors Guild of America	1	1
Dorian Awards	1	4
Empire Awards	2	4
Golden Globe Awards	1	4
Golden Tomato Awards	2	2
Grammy Awards	0	1
Hollywood Film Festival	1	1
Houston Film Critics Society	4	5
Hugo Awards	1	1
Irish Film & Television Awards	0	2
Kids' Choice Awards	0	2
London Film Critics Circle Awards	2	4
Los Angeles Film Critics Association	4	4
Motion Picture Sound Editors	1	3
MTV Movie Awards	0	1
National Board of Review	2	2
New York Film Critics Online	2	2
Online Film Critics Society	3	4
Palm Springs International Film Festival	1	1
People's Choice Awards	3	3
Producers Guild of America Awards	1	1
San Diego Film Critics Society	1	7
San Francisco Film Critics Circle	4	7
Satellite Awards	3	8
Saturn Awards	5	8
Science Fiction and Fantasy Writers of America	1	1
Screen Actors Guild Awards	0	1
Society of Camera Operators	1	1
St. Louis Film Critics Association	1	7
Venice Film Festival	1	1
Visual Effects Society	6	7
Washington D.C. Area Film Critics Association	3	7
- Total number of awards and nominations
Totals	98	174
- References

Gravity is a 2013 science-fiction thriller film directed, co-produced, co-written, and co-edited by Alfonso Cuarón. The film's musical score was composed by Steven Price, with the cinematography provided by Cuarón's longtime collaborator, Emmanuel Lubezki. The film stars Sandra Bullock and George Clooney as astronauts involved in the mid-orbit destruction of a Space Shuttle and their attempt to return to Earth.

Gravity premiered at the 70th Venice International Film Festival on August 28, 2013, where it won the Future Film Festival Digital Award. The film then received a wide release at over 3,500 theaters in the United States and Canada on October 4, 2013, by Warner Bros. On its opening weekend, it grossed over $55 million which broke the North American opening weekend record for the month of October. Gravity grossed a worldwide total of over $723 million on a budget of $100 million. As of 2019, it is Clooney's highest-grossing film to date. Rotten Tomatoes, a review aggregator, surveyed 345 reviews and judged 96 percent to be positive.

Gravity garnered awards and nominations in various categories with particular recognition for its direction, cinematography, score, and visual effects. The film received 10 nominations at the 86th Academy Awards, the most nominations of 2014's ceremony tied with American Hustle. It went on to earn the most awards at the ceremony, winning seven including Best Director for Cuarón, Best Cinematography for Lubezki, Best Original Score for Price, and Best Visual Effects. The film received four nominations at the 71st Golden Globe Awards, with Cuarón winning for Best Director. Gravity led the nominations at the 67th British Academy Film Awards with eleven nominations. The film won six awards, the most at the ceremony, including Outstanding British Film, Best Director for Cuarón, Best Cinematography for Lubezki, Best Original Music for Price, and Best Visual Effects.

At the Producers Guild Awards, Gravity tied for Best Theatrical Motion Picture with 12 Years a Slave. Cuarón received the Best Director award from the Directors Guild of America and Bullock was also nominated for Best Actress at the Screen Actors Guild Awards. At the 40th Saturn Awards, Gravity joint-led the nominations with The Hobbit: The Desolation of Smaug, both films receiving eight nominations. The film went on to win five Saturn Awards including Best Science Fiction Film, Best Director for Cuarón and Best Actress for Bullock. The film's visual effects were acclaimed by the Visual Effects Society, which gave the film six awards including their top award for Outstanding Visual Effects in an Effects Driven Film. Both the American Film Institute and National Board of Review included the film in their list of top ten films of 2013.

== Accolades ==
Accolades received by Gravity (2013 film)
Award	Date of ceremony	Category	Recipient(s)	Result	Ref.
AARP Annual Movies for Grownups Awards	January 6, 2014	Best Director	Alfonso Cuarón	Won	
Academy Awards	March 2, 2014	Best Picture	Alfonso Cuarón and David Heyman	Nominated	
Academy Awards	March 2, 2014	Best Director	Alfonso Cuarón	Won	
Academy Awards	March 2, 2014	Best Actress	Sandra Bullock	Nominated	
Academy Awards	March 2, 2014	Best Cinematography	Emmanuel Lubezki	Won	
Academy Awards	March 2, 2014	Best Film Editing	Alfonso Cuarón and Mark Sanger	Won	
Academy Awards	March 2, 2014	Best Original Score	Steven Price	Won	
Academy Awards	March 2, 2014	Best Production Design	Production Design: Andy Nicholson; Set Decoration: Rosie Goodwin and Joanne Woollard	Nominated	
Academy Awards	March 2, 2014	Best Sound Editing	Glenn Freemantle	Won	
Academy Awards	March 2, 2014	Best Sound Mixing	Skip Lievsay, Niv Adiri, Christopher Benstead and Chris Munro	Won	
Academy Awards	March 2, 2014	Best Visual Effects	Tim Webber, Chris Lawrence, David Shirk and Neil Corbould	Won	
African-American Film Critics Association	December 13, 2013	Best Actress	Sandra Bullock	Won	
Alliance of Women Film Journalists	December 19, 2013	Best Film	Gravity	Nominated	
Alliance of Women Film Journalists	December 19, 2013	Best Director (Female or Male)	Alfonso Cuarón	Won	
Alliance of Women Film Journalists	December 19, 2013	Best Actress	Sandra Bullock	Nominated	
Alliance of Women Film Journalists	December 19, 2013	Best Cinematography	Emmanuel Lubezki	Won	
Alliance of Women Film Journalists	December 19, 2013	Best Editing	Alfonso Cuarón and Mark Sanger	Won	
Alliance of Women Film Journalists	December 19, 2013	Best Music or Score	Steven Price	Nominated	
Alliance of Women Film Journalists	December 19, 2013	Kick Ass Award for Best Female Action Star	Sandra Bullock	Won	
Alliance of Women Film Journalists	December 19, 2013	Actress Defying Age and Agism	Sandra Bullock	Won	
Alliance of Women Film Journalists	December 19, 2013	AWJF Female Icon Award	Sandra Bullock "for the strong, capable and very positive female image presented in Gravity"	Nominated	
Alliance of Women Film Journalists	December 19, 2013	Unforgettable Moment Award	"George Clooney reappears"	Nominated	
American Cinema Editors	February 7, 2014	Best Edited Feature Film (Dramatic)	Alfonso Cuarón and Mark Sanger	Nominated	
American Film Institute	January 10, 2014	Top 10 Movies of the Year	Alfonso Cuarón and David Heyman	Won	
American Society of Cinematographers Awards	February 1, 2014	Outstanding Achievement in Cinematography in Theatrical Releases	Emmanuel Lubezki	Won	
Art Directors Guild	February 8, 2014	Excellence in Production Design – Fantasy Film	Andy Nicholson	Won	
Australian Academy of Cinema and Television Arts International Awards	January 10, 2014	Best Film	Gravity	Won	
Australian Academy of Cinema and Television Arts International Awards	January 10, 2014	Best Direction	Alfonso Cuarón	Won	
Australian Academy of Cinema and Television Arts International Awards	January 10, 2014	Best Actress	Sandra Bullock	Nominated	
Bodil Awards	February 1, 2014	Best US Feature	Gravity	Nominated	
Boston Society of Film Critics	December 8, 2013	Best Cinematography	Emmanuel Lubezki	Won	
British Academy Film Awards	February 16, 2014	Best Film	Alfonso Cuarón and David Heyman	Nominated	
British Academy Film Awards	February 16, 2014	Outstanding British Film	Alfonso Cuarón, David Heyman, and Jonás Cuarón	Won	
British Academy Film Awards	February 16, 2014	Best Director	Alfonso Cuarón	Won	
British Academy Film Awards	February 16, 2014	Best Original Screenplay	Alfonso Cuarón and Jonás Cuarón	Nominated	
British Academy Film Awards	February 16, 2014	Best Actress in a Leading Role	Sandra Bullock	Nominated	
British Academy Film Awards	February 16, 2014	Best Cinematography	Emmanuel Lubezki	Won	
British Academy Film Awards	February 16, 2014	Best Original Music	Steven Price	Won	
British Academy Film Awards	February 16, 2014	Best Production Design	Andy Nicholson, Rosie Goodwin, and Joanne Woodlard	Nominated	
British Academy Film Awards	February 16, 2014	Best Editing	Alfonso Cuarón and Mark Sanger	Nominated	
British Academy Film Awards	February 16, 2014	Best Sound	Glenn Freemantle, Skip Lievsay, Christopher Benstead, Niv Adiri, and Chris Munro	Won	
British Academy Film Awards	February 16, 2014	Best Special Visual Effects	Tim Webber, Chris Lawrence, David Shirk, Neil Corbould, and Nikki Penny	Won	
César Awards	February 28, 2014	Best Foreign Film	Gravity	Nominated	
Chicago Film Critics Association	December 13, 2013	Best Film	Gravity	Nominated	
Chicago Film Critics Association	December 13, 2013	Best Director	Alfonso Cuarón	Nominated	
Chicago Film Critics Association	December 13, 2013	Best Actress	Sandra Bullock	Nominated	
Chicago Film Critics Association	December 13, 2013	Best Cinematography	Emmanuel Lubezki	Won	
Chicago Film Critics Association	December 13, 2013	Best Original Score	Steven Price	Nominated	
Chicago Film Critics Association	December 13, 2013	Best Editing	Alfonso Cuarón and Mark Sanger	Won	
Chicago Film Critics Association	December 13, 2013	Best Art Direction/Production Design	Gravity	Won	
Cinema Audio Society Awards	February 22, 2014	Outstanding Achievement in Sound Mixing for a Motion Picture – Live Action	Chris Munro, Skip Lievsay, Niv Adiri, Christopher Benstead, Gareth Cousins, Chris Navarro, Thomas J. O’Connell, and Adam Fil Mendez	Won	
Critics' Choice Movie Awards	January 16, 2014	Best Picture	Gravity	Nominated	
Critics' Choice Movie Awards	January 16, 2014	Best Sci-Fi/Horror Movie	Gravity	Won	
Critics' Choice Movie Awards	January 16, 2014	Best Director	Alfonso Cuarón	Won	
Critics' Choice Movie Awards	January 16, 2014	Best Actress	Sandra Bullock	Nominated	
Critics' Choice Movie Awards	January 16, 2014	Best Actress in an Action Movie	Sandra Bullock	Won	
Critics' Choice Movie Awards	January 16, 2014	Best Cinematography	Emmanuel Lubezki	Won	
Critics' Choice Movie Awards	January 16, 2014	Best Art Direction	Andy Nicholson and Rosie Goodwin	Nominated	
Critics' Choice Movie Awards	January 16, 2014	Best Editing	Alfonso Cuarón and Mark Sanger	Won	
Critics' Choice Movie Awards	January 16, 2014	Best Composer	Steven Price	Won	
Critics' Choice Movie Awards	January 16, 2014	Best Visual Effects	Gravity	Won	
Detroit Film Critics Society	December 13, 2013	Best Film	Gravity	Nominated	
Detroit Film Critics Society	December 13, 2013	Best Director	Alfonso Cuarón	Won	
Directors Guild of America Award	January 25, 2014	Outstanding Directorial Achievement in Motion Pictures	Alfonso Cuarón	Won	
Dorian Awards	January 21, 2014	Film of the Year	Gravity	Nominated	
Dorian Awards	January 21, 2014	Film Performance of the Year – Actress	Sandra Bullock	Nominated	
Dorian Awards	January 21, 2014	Visually Striking Film of the Year	Gravity	Won	
Dorian Awards	January 21, 2014	Wilde Artist of the Year	Alfonso Cuarón	Nominated	
Empire Awards	March 30, 2014	Best Film	Gravity	Won	
Empire Awards	March 30, 2014	Best Sci-Fi/Fantasy	Gravity	Nominated	
Empire Awards	March 30, 2014	Best Director	Alfonso Cuarón	Won	
Empire Awards	March 30, 2014	Best Actress	Sandra Bullock	Nominated	
Golden Eagle Award	January 29, 2014	Best Foreign Language Film	Gravity	Won	
Golden Globe Awards	January 12, 2014	Best Motion Picture – Drama	Gravity	Nominated	
Golden Globe Awards	January 12, 2014	Best Director	Alfonso Cuarón	Won	
Golden Globe Awards	January 12, 2014	Best Performance by an Actress in a Motion Picture – Drama	Sandra Bullock	Nominated	
Golden Globe Awards	January 12, 2014	Best Original Score	Steven Price	Nominated	
Golden Tomato Awards	January 9, 2014	Wide Release	Gravity	Won	
Golden Tomato Awards	January 9, 2014	Action/Adventure	Gravity	Won	
Grammy Awards	February 8, 2015	Best Score Soundtrack for Visual Media	Steven Price	Nominated	
Hollywood Film Festival	October 17, 2013	Actress of the Year	Sandra Bullock	Won	
Houston Film Critics Society	December 15, 2013	Best Picture	Gravity	Nominated	
Houston Film Critics Society	December 15, 2013	Best Director	Alfonso Cuarón	Won	
Houston Film Critics Society	December 15, 2013	Best Actress	Sandra Bullock	Won	
Houston Film Critics Society	December 15, 2013	Best Cinematography	Emmanuel Lubezki	Won	
Houston Film Critics Society	December 15, 2013	Best Original Score	Steven Price	Won	
Hugo Awards	August 17, 2014	Best Dramatic Presentation, Long Form	Alfonso Cuarón (writer and director) and Jonás Cuarón (writer)	Won	
Irish Film & Television Awards	April 5, 2014	International Film	Gravity	Nominated	
Irish Film & Television Awards	April 5, 2014	International Actress	Sandra Bullock	Nominated	
Kids' Choice Awards	March 29, 2014	Favorite Movie Actress	Sandra Bullock	Nominated	
Kids' Choice Awards	March 29, 2014	Favorite Female Buttkicker	Sandra Bullock	Nominated	
London Film Critics Circle Awards	February 2, 2014	Film of the Year	Gravity	Nominated	
London Film Critics Circle Awards	February 2, 2014	Actress of the Year	Sandra Bullock	Nominated	
London Film Critics Circle Awards	February 2, 2014	Director of the Year	Alfonso Cuarón	Won	
London Film Critics Circle Awards	February 2, 2014	Technical Achievement Award	Tim Webber (special effects)	Won	
Los Angeles Film Critics Association	December 8, 2013	Best Film	Gravity (tied with Her)	Tied	
Los Angeles Film Critics Association	December 8, 2013	Best Director	Alfonso Cuarón	Won	
Los Angeles Film Critics Association	December 8, 2013	Best Cinematography	Emmanuel Lubezki	Won	
Los Angeles Film Critics Association	December 8, 2013	Best Editing	Alfonso Cuarón and Mark Sanger	Won	
Motion Picture Sound Editors Golden Reel Awards	February 16, 2014	Best Sound Editing: Music Score in a Feature Film	Christopher Benstead	Nominated	
Motion Picture Sound Editors Golden Reel Awards	February 16, 2014	Best Sound Editing: Sound Effects & Foley in a Feature Film	Glenn Freemantle	Won	
Motion Picture Sound Editors Golden Reel Awards	February 16, 2014	Best Sound Editing: Dialogue & ADR in a Feature Film	Glenn Freemantle	Nominated	
MTV Movie Awards	April 13, 2014	Best Female Performance	Sandra Bullock	Nominated	
National Board of Review	December 4, 2013	Creative Innovation in Filmmaking	Alfonso Cuarón	Won	
National Board of Review	December 4, 2013	Top Ten Films	Gravity	Won	
New York Film Critics Online	December 8, 2013	Best Director	Alfonso Cuarón	Won	
New York Film Critics Online	December 8, 2013	Best Cinematography	Emmanuel Lubezki	Won	
Online Film Critics Society Awards	December 16, 2013	Best Picture	Gravity	Nominated	
Online Film Critics Society Awards	December 16, 2013	Best Director	Alfonso Cuarón	Won	
Online Film Critics Society Awards	December 16, 2013	Best Editing	Alfonso Cuarón and Mark Sanger	Won	
Online Film Critics Society Awards	December 16, 2013	Best Cinematography	Emmanuel Lubezki	Won	
Palm Springs International Film Festival	January 13, 2014	Desert Palm Achievement Award	Sandra Bullock	Won	
People's Choice Awards	January 8, 2014	Favorite Dramatic Movie	Gravity	Won	
People's Choice Awards	January 8, 2014	Favorite Dramatic Movie Actress	Sandra Bullock	Won	
People's Choice Awards	January 8, 2014	Favorite Movie Duo	Sandra Bullock and George Clooney	Won	
Producers Guild of America Awards	January 19, 2014	Best Theatrical Motion Picture	Alfonso Cuarón and David Heyman (tied with Anthony Katagas, Jeremy Kleiner, Steve McQueen, Brad Pitt, and Dede Gardner for 12 Years a Slave)	Tied	
San Diego Film Critics Society	December 11, 2013	Best Film	Gravity	Nominated	
San Diego Film Critics Society	December 11, 2013	Best Director	Alfonso Cuarón	Won	
San Diego Film Critics Society	December 11, 2013	Best Actress	Sandra Bullock	Nominated	
San Diego Film Critics Society	December 11, 2013	Best Cinematography	Emmanuel Lubezki	Nominated	
San Diego Film Critics Society	December 11, 2013	Best Editing	Alfonso Cuarón and Mark Sanger	Nominated	
San Diego Film Critics Society	December 11, 2013	Best Original Score	Steven Price	Nominated	
San Diego Film Critics Society	December 11, 2013	Best Production Design	Andy Nicholson and Rosie Goodwin	Nominated	
San Francisco Film Critics Circle	December 13, 2013	Best Picture	Gravity	Nominated	
San Francisco Film Critics Circle	December 13, 2013	Best Director	Alfonso Cuarón	Won	
San Francisco Film Critics Circle	December 13, 2013	Best Actress	Sandra Bullock	Nominated	
San Francisco Film Critics Circle	December 13, 2013	Best Original Screenplay	Alfonso Cuarón and Jonás Cuarón	Nominated	
San Francisco Film Critics Circle	December 13, 2013	Best Cinematography	Emmanuel Lubezki	Won	
San Francisco Film Critics Circle	December 13, 2013	Best Editing	Alfonso Cuarón and Mark Sanger	Won	
San Francisco Film Critics Circle	December 13, 2013	Best Production Design	Andy Nicholson	Won	
Satellite Awards	February 23, 2014	Best Motion Picture	Gravity	Nominated	
Satellite Awards	February 23, 2014	Best Director	Alfonso Cuarón	Nominated	
Satellite Awards	February 23, 2014	Best Actress – Motion Picture	Sandra Bullock	Nominated	
Satellite Awards	February 23, 2014	Best Cinematography	Emmanuel Lubezki	Nominated	
Satellite Awards	February 23, 2014	Best Editing	Alfonso Cuarón and Mark Sanger	Nominated	
Satellite Awards	February 23, 2014	Best Visual Effects	Chris Howell, Chris Lawrence, and Tim Webber	Won	
Satellite Awards	February 23, 2014	Best Original Score	Steven Price	Won	
Satellite Awards	February 23, 2014	Best Sound (Editing and Mixing)	Glenn Freemantle, Niv Adiri, and Skip Lievsay	Won	
Saturn Awards	June 26, 2014	Best Science Fiction Film	Gravity	Won	
Saturn Awards	June 26, 2014	Best Director	Alfonso Cuarón	Won	
Saturn Awards	June 26, 2014	Best Writing	Alfonso Cuarón and Jonás Cuarón	Nominated	
Saturn Awards	June 26, 2014	Best Actress	Sandra Bullock	Won	
Saturn Awards	June 26, 2014	Best Supporting Actor	George Clooney	Nominated	
Saturn Awards	June 26, 2014	Best Production Design	Andy Nicholson	Nominated	
Saturn Awards	June 26, 2014	Best Editing	Alfonso Cuarón and Mark Sanger	Won	
Saturn Awards	June 26, 2014	Best Special Effects	Tim Webber, Chris Lawrence, David Shirk, and Neil Corbould	Won	
Science Fiction and Fantasy Writers of America	May 17, 2014	Ray Bradbury Award for Outstanding Dramatic Presentation	Alfonso Cuarón and Jonás Cuarón	Won	
Screen Actors Guild Awards	January 18, 2014	Outstanding Performance by a Female Actor in a Leading Role	Sandra Bullock	Nominated	
Society of Camera Operators Awards	March 8, 2014	Camera Operator of the Year – Feature Film	Peter Taylor	Won	
St. Louis Film Critics Association	December 16, 2013	Best Film	Gravity	Nominated	
St. Louis Film Critics Association	December 16, 2013	Best Director	Alfonso Cuarón	Runner-up	
St. Louis Film Critics Association	December 16, 2013	Best Actress	Sandra Bullock	Nominated	
St. Louis Film Critics Association	December 16, 2013	Best Cinematography	Emmanuel Lubezki	Runner-up	
St. Louis Film Critics Association	December 16, 2013	Best Visual Special Effects	Chris Howell, Chris Lawrence, and Tim Webber	Won	
St. Louis Film Critics Association	December 16, 2013	Best Musical Score	Steven Price	Nominated	
St. Louis Film Critics Association	December 16, 2013	Best Scene	"The opening tracking shot"	Runner-up	
Teen Choice Awards	August 10, 2014	Choice Movie Actress: Drama	Sandra Bullock	Nominated	
Venice Film Festival	September 7, 2013	Future Film Digital Award	Alfonso Cuarón	Won	
Visual Effects Society	February 12, 2014	Outstanding Visual Effects in an Effects Driven Feature Motion Picture	Tim Webber, Nikki Penny, Chris Lawrence, and Richard McBride	Won	
Visual Effects Society	February 12, 2014	Outstanding Animated Character in a Live Action Feature Motion Picture	Max Solomon, Mathieu Vig, Michael Brunet, and David Shirk	Nominated	
Visual Effects Society	February 12, 2014	Outstanding Created Environment in a Live Action Feature Motion Picture	Interior: Harry Bardak, Nathan Walster, Jonathan Fawkner, and Claire Michaud; Exterior: Paul Beilby, Kyle McCulloch, Stuart Penn, and Ian Comley	Won	
Visual Effects Society	February 12, 2014	Outstanding Virtual Cinematography in a Live Action Feature Motion Picture	Tim Webber, Emmanuel Lubezki, Richard McBride, and Dale Newton	Won	
Visual Effects Society	February 12, 2014	Outstanding Models in a Feature Motion Picture	Ben Lambert, Paul Beilby, Chris Lawrence, and Andy Nicholson	Won	
Visual Effects Society	February 12, 2014	Outstanding FX and Simulation Animation in a Live Action Feature Motion Picture	Alexis Wajsbrot, Sylvain Degrotte, Horacio Mendoza, and Juan‐Luis Sanchez	Won	
Visual Effects Society	February 12, 2014	Outstanding Compositing in a Feature Motion Picture	Mark Bakowski, Anthony Smith, Theodor Groeneboom, and Adrian Metzelaar	Won	
Washington D.C. Area Film Critics Association	December 9, 2013	Best Film	Gravity	Nominated	
Washington D.C. Area Film Critics Association	December 9, 2013	Best Director	Alfonso Cuarón	Won	
Washington D.C. Area Film Critics Association	December 9, 2013	Best Actress	Sandra Bullock	Nominated	
Washington D.C. Area Film Critics Association	December 9, 2013	Best Art Direction	Andy Nicholson and Rosie Goodwin	Nominated	
Washington D.C. Area Film Critics Association	December 9, 2013	Best Cinematography	Emmanuel Lubezki	Won	
Washington D.C. Area Film Critics Association	December 9, 2013	Best Editing	Alfonso Cuarón and Mark Sanger	Won	
Washington D.C. Area Film Critics Association	December 9, 2013	Best Score	Steven Price	Nominated	

^{^[I]} Each date is linked to the article about the awards held that year wherever possible.
