= 67th British Academy Film Awards =

2014 film award ceremony

- Date: 16 February 2014
- Site: Royal Opera House, London
- Hosted by: Stephen Fry

Highlights
- Best Film: 12 Years a Slave
- Best British Film: Gravity
- Best Actor: Chiwetel Ejiofor; 12 Years a Slave
- Best Actress: Cate Blanchett; Blue Jasmine
- Most awards: Gravity (6)
- Most nominations: Gravity (11)

The 67th British Academy Film Awards, more commonly known as the BAFTAs, were held on 16 February 2014 at the Royal Opera House in London, honouring the best national and foreign films of 2013. The nominations were announced on 8 January 2014 by actor Luke Evans and actress Helen McCrory. Presented by the British Academy of Film and Television Arts, accolades were handed out for the best feature-length film and documentaries of any nationality that were screened at British cinemas in 2013.

Gravity won six of its eleven nominations, including Best Director for Alfonso Cuarón, Outstanding British Film, Best Cinematography, Best Original Music, Best Sound, and Best Special Visual Effects. 12 Years a Slave won Best Film and Best Actor in a Leading Role for Chiwetel Ejiofor. Cate Blanchett won Best Actress in a Leading Role for Blue Jasmine, Barkhad Abdi won Best Actor in a Supporting Role for Captain Phillips, and Jennifer Lawrence won Best Actress in a Supporting Role for American Hustle.

The ceremony was broadcast on BBC One and BBC Three. It was hosted by Stephen Fry, the ninth time he's hosted the ceremony. The ceremony opened with a duet call "Heroes" from Tinie Tempah and singer Laura Mvula. Viewing figures were the lowest since 2010, with 4.73 million watching the ceremony.

== Winners and nominees ==
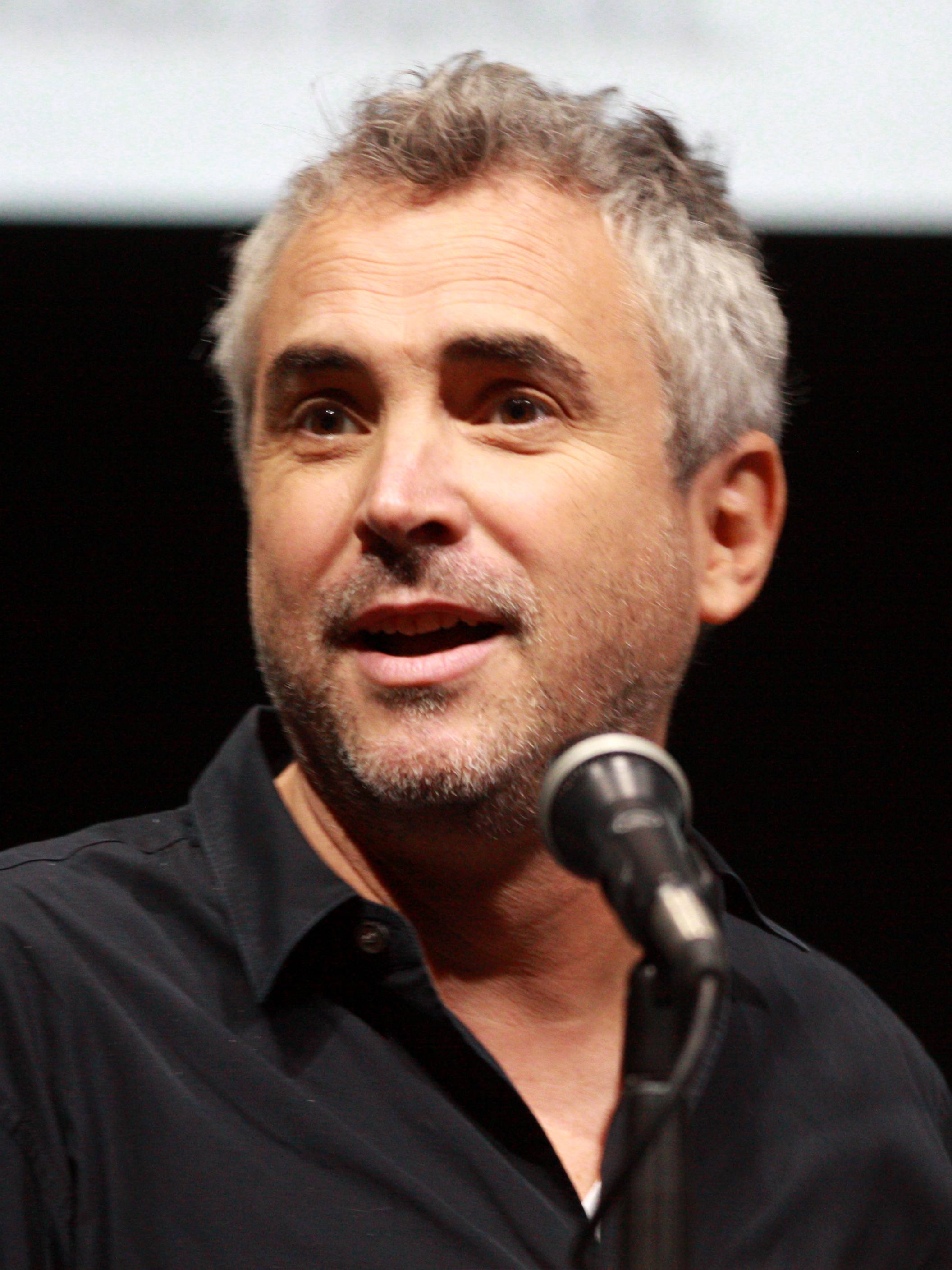
Alfonso Cuarón, Best Director winner

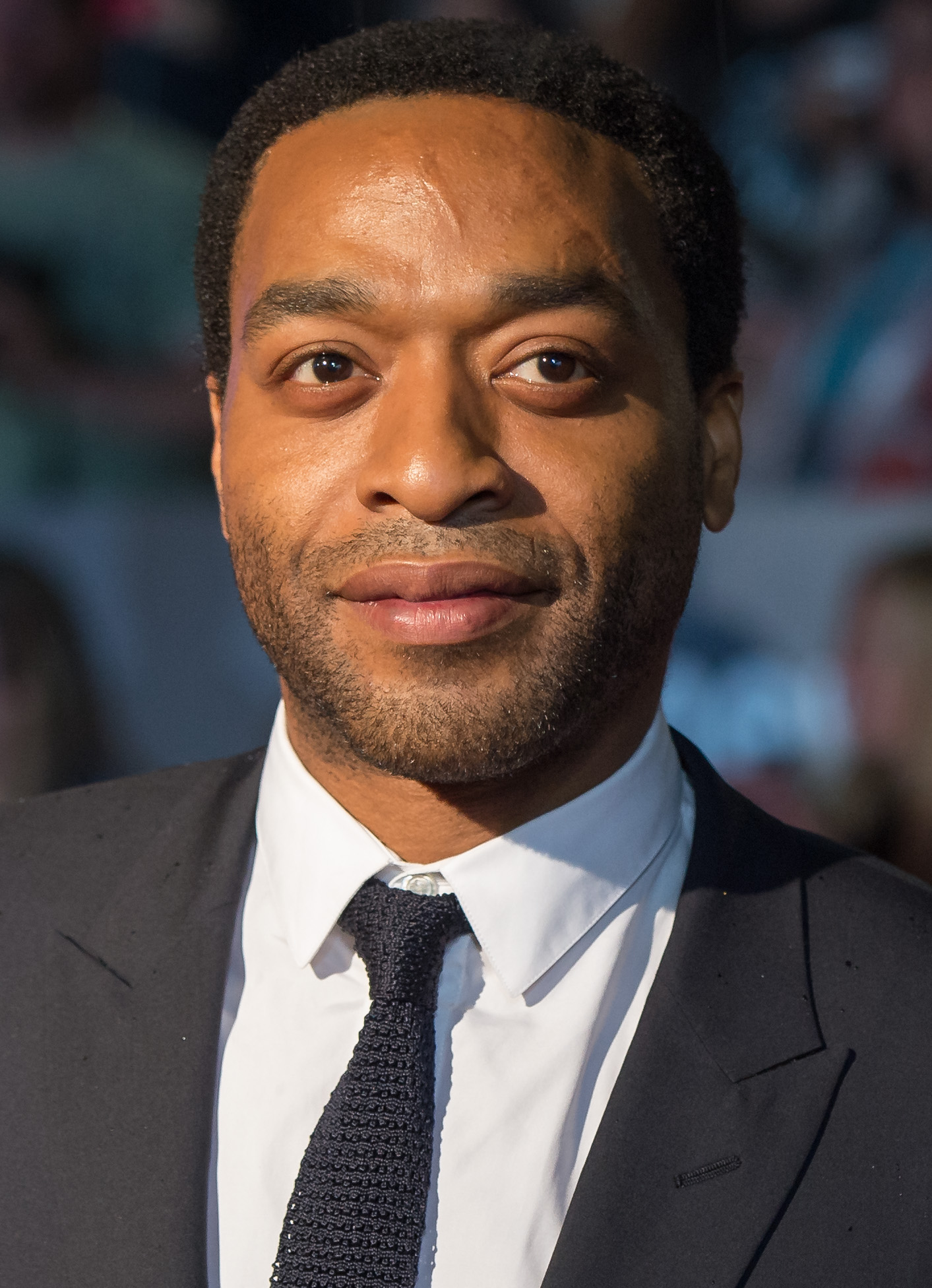
Chiwetel Ejiofor, Best Actor winner

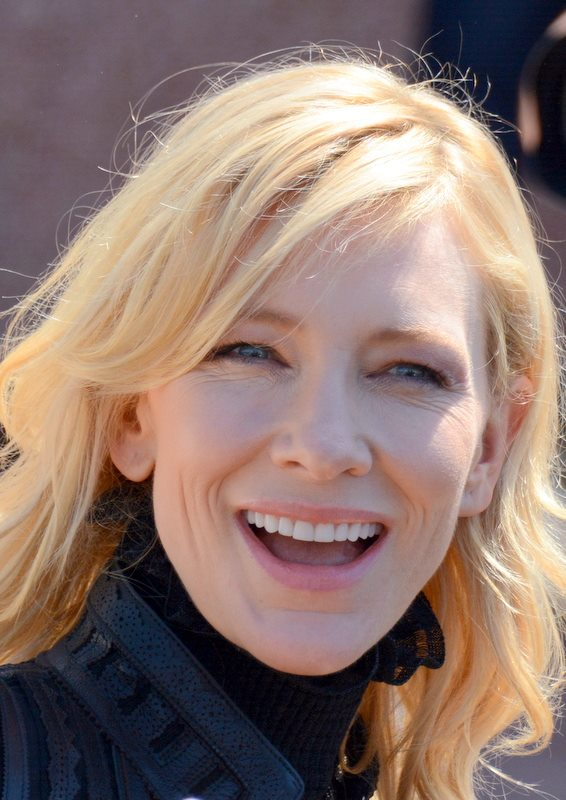
Cate Blanchett, Best Actress winner

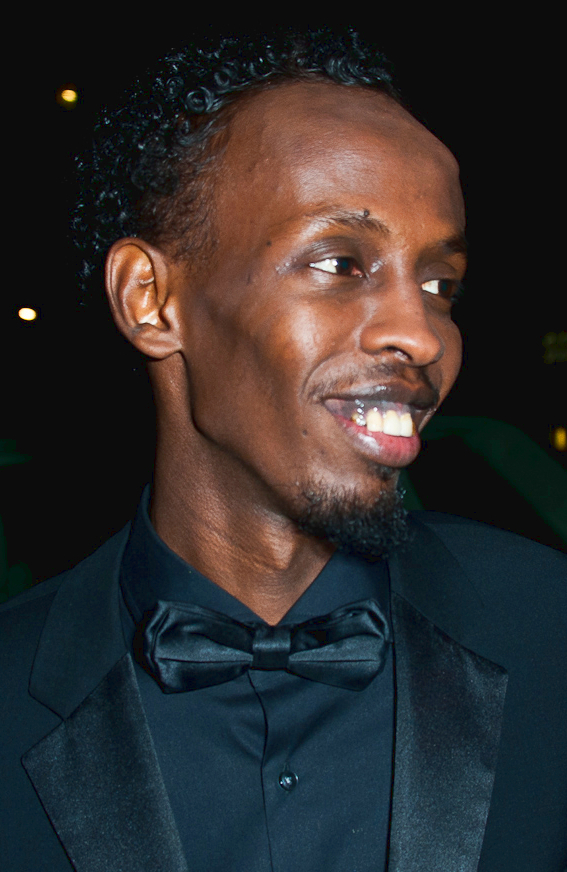
Barkhad Abdi, Best Supporting Actor winner

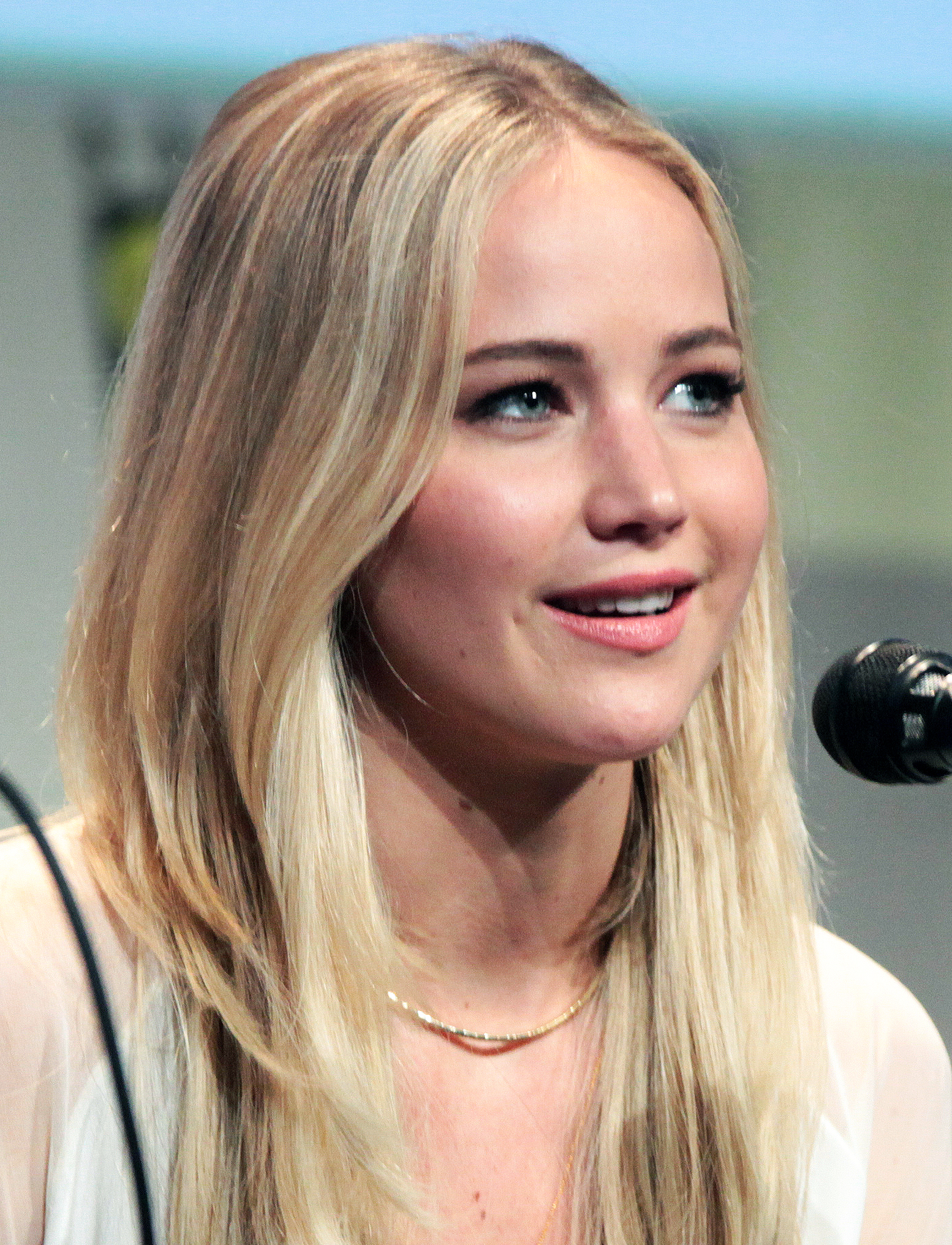
Jennifer Lawrence, Best Supporting Actress winner

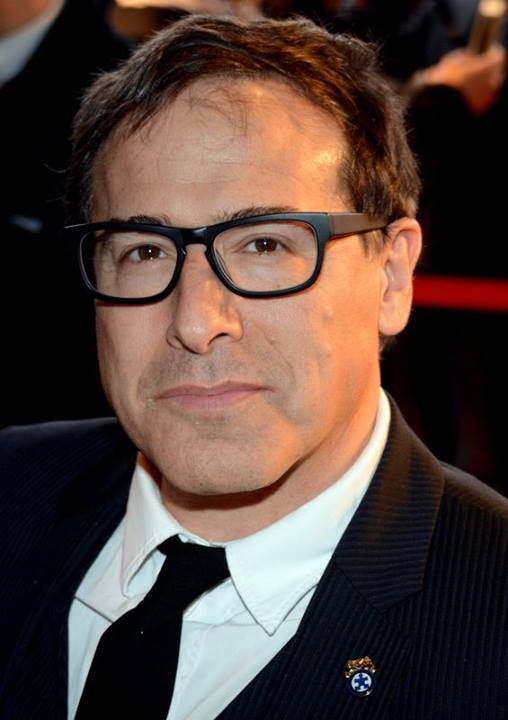
David O. Russell, Best Original Screenplay co-winner

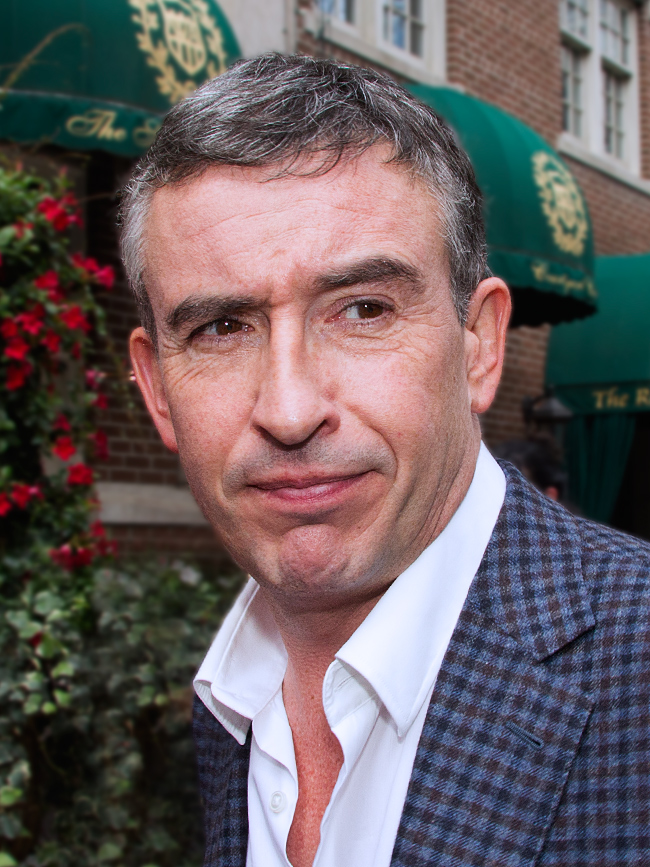
Steve Coogan, Best Adapted Screenplay co-winner

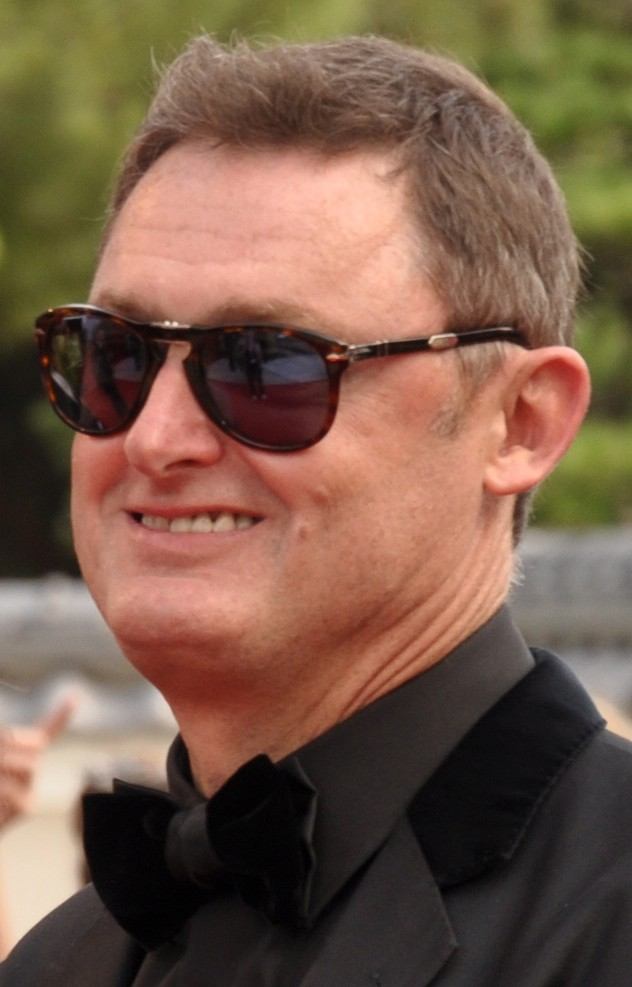
Jeff Pope, Best Adapted Screenplay co-winner

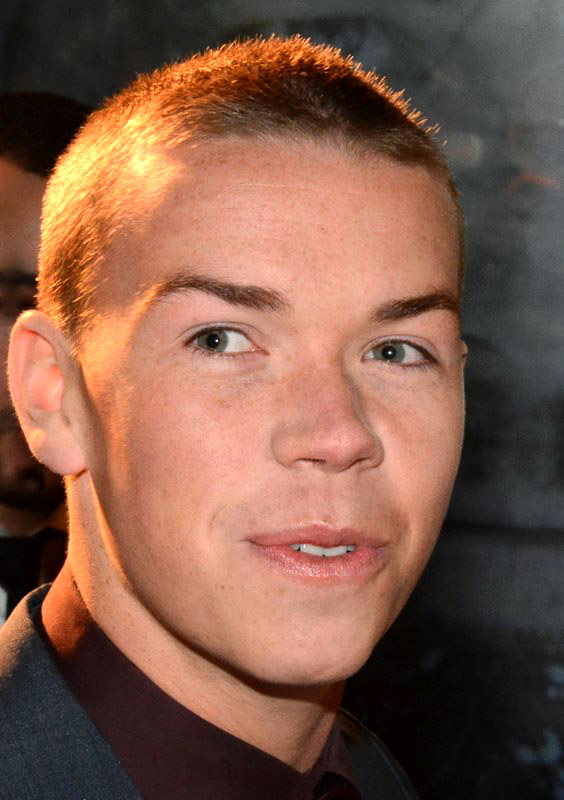
Will Poulter, EE Rising Star Award winner

=== BAFTA Fellowship ===
- Helen Mirren

=== Outstanding British Contribution to Cinema ===
- Peter Greenaway

Best Film: 12 Years a Slave – Anthony Katagas, Brad Pitt, Dede Gardner, Jeremy Kleiner and Steve McQueen; American Hustle – Charles Roven, Richard Suckle, Megan Ellison and Jonathan Gordon; Captain Phillips – Scott Rudin, Dana Brunetti and Michael De Luca; Gravity – Alfonso Cuarón and David Heyman; Philomena – Gabrielle Tana, Steve Coogan and Tracey Seaward	Best Direction: Alfonso Cuarón – Gravity; Paul Greengrass – Captain Phillips; Steve McQueen – 12 Years a Slave; David O. Russell – American Hustle; Martin Scorsese – The Wolf of Wall Street
Best Actor in a Leading Role: Chiwetel Ejiofor – 12 Years a Slave as Solomon Northup; Christian Bale – American Hustle as Irving Rosenfeld; Bruce Dern – Nebraska as Woodrow Grant; Leonardo DiCaprio – The Wolf of Wall Street as Jordan Belfort; Tom Hanks – Captain Phillips as Richard Phillips	Best Actress in a Leading Role: Cate Blanchett – Blue Jasmine as Jeanette Francis; Amy Adams – American Hustle as Sydney Prosser/Lady Edith Greensly; Sandra Bullock – Gravity as Ryan Stone; Judi Dench – Philomena as Philomena Lee; Emma Thompson – Saving Mr. Banks as P. L. Travers
Best Actor in a Supporting Role: Barkhad Abdi – Captain Phillips as Abduwali Muse; Daniel Brühl – Rush as Niki Lauda; Bradley Cooper – American Hustle as Richie DiMaso; Matt Damon – Behind the Candelabra as Scott Thorson; Michael Fassbender – 12 Years a Slave as Edwin Epps	Best Actress in a Supporting Role: Jennifer Lawrence – American Hustle as Rosalyn Rosenfeld; Sally Hawkins – Blue Jasmine as Ginger; Lupita Nyong'o – 12 Years a Slave as Patsey; Julia Roberts – August: Osage County as Barbara Weston-Fordham; Oprah Winfrey – The Butler as Gloria Gaines
Best Original Screenplay: American Hustle – Eric Warren Singer and David O. Russell; Blue Jasmine – Woody Allen; Gravity – Alfonso Cuarón and Jonás Cuarón; Inside Llewyn Davis – Joel Coen and Ethan Coen; Nebraska – Bob Nelson	Best Adapted Screenplay: Philomena – Steve Coogan and Jeff Pope; 12 Years a Slave – John Ridley; Behind the Candelabra – Richard LaGravenese; Captain Phillips – Billy Ray; The Wolf of Wall Street – Terence Winter
Best Cinematography: Gravity – Emmanuel Lubezki; 12 Years a Slave – Sean Bobbitt; Captain Phillips – Barry Ackroyd; Inside Llewyn Davis – Bruno Delbonnel; Nebraska – Phedon Papamichael	Best Costume Design: The Great Gatsby – Catherine Martin; American Hustle – Michael Wilkinson; Behind the Candelabra – Ellen Mirojnick; The Invisible Woman – Michael O'Connor; Saving Mr. Banks – Daniel Orlandi
Best Editing: Rush – Daniel P. Hanley and Mike Hill; 12 Years a Slave – Joe Walker; Captain Phillips – Christopher Rouse; Gravity – Alfonso Cuarón and Mark Sanger; The Wolf of Wall Street – Thelma Schoonmaker	Best Makeup and Hair: American Hustle – Evelyne Noraz, Lori McCoy-Bell and Kathrine Gordon; Behind the Candelabra – Kate Biscoe and Marie Larkin; The Butler – Debra Denson, Candace Neal, Robert Stevenson and Matthew W. Mungle; The Great Gatsby – Maurizio Silvi and Kerry Warn; The Hobbit: The Desolation of Smaug – Peter King, Richard Taylor and Rick Findlater
Best Original Music: Gravity – Steven Price; 12 Years a Slave – Hans Zimmer; The Book Thief – John Williams; Captain Phillips – Henry Jackman; Saving Mr. Banks – Thomas Newman	Best Production Design: The Great Gatsby – Catherine Martin and Beverley Dunn; 12 Years a Slave – Adam Stockhausen and Alice Baker; American Hustle – Judy Becker and Heather Loeffler; Behind the Candelabra – Howard Cummings and Barbara Munch-Cameron; Gravity – Andy Nicholson, Rosie Goodwin and Joanne Woollard
Best Sound: Gravity – Glenn Freemantle, Skip Lievsay, Christopher Benstead, Niv Adiri and Chris Munro; All Is Lost – Richard Hymns, Steve Boeddeker, Brandon Proctor, Micah Bloomberg and Gillian Arthur; Captain Phillips – Chris Burdon, Mark Taylor, Mike Prestwood Smith, Chris Munro and Oliver Tarney; Inside Llewyn Davis – Peter Kurland, Skip Lievsay, Greg Orloff and Paul Urmson; Rush – Danny Hambrook, Martin Steyer, Stefan Korte, Markus Stemier and Frank Kruse	Best Special Visual Effects: Gravity – Tim Webber, Chris Lawrence, Dave Shirk, Neil Corbould and Nikki Penny; The Hobbit: The Desolation of Smaug – Joe Letteri, Eric Saindon, David Clayton and Eric Reynolds; Iron Man 3 – Bryan Grill, Christopher Townsend, Guy Williams and Dan Sudick; Pacific Rim – Hal Hickel, John Knoll, Lindy De Quattro and Nigel Sumner; Star Trek Into Darkness – Roger Guyett, Patrick Tubach, Ben Grossmann and Burt Dalton
Outstanding British Film: Gravity – Alfonso Cuarón, David Heyman and Jonás Cuarón; Mandela: Long Walk to Freedom – Justin Chadwick, Anant Singh, David M. Thompson and William Nicholson; Philomena – Stephen Frears, Gabrielle Tana, Steve Coogan, Tracey Seaward and Jeff Pope; Rush – Ron Howard, Andrew Eaton and Peter Morgan; Saving Mr. Banks – John Lee Hancock, Alison Owen, Ian Collie, Philip Steuer, Kelly Marcel and Sue Smith; The Selfish Giant – Clio Barnard and Tracy O'Riordan	Outstanding Debut by a British Writer, Director or Producer: Kelly + Victor – Kieran Evans (Writer/Director); For Those in Peril – Paul Wright (Writer/Director) and Polly Stokes (Producer); Good Vibrations – Colin Carberry and Glenn Patterson (Writer); Saving Mr. Banks – Kelly Marcel (Writer); Shell – Scott Graham (Writer/Director)
Best Short Animation: Sleeping with the Fishes – James Walker, Sarah Woolner and Yousif Al-Khalifa; Everything I Can See from Here – Bjorn-Erik Aschim, Friederike Nicolaus and Sam Taylor; I Am Tom Moody – Ainslie Henderson	Best Short Film: Room 8 – James Griffiths and Sophie Venner; Island Queen – Ben Mallaby, Nat Luurtsema and Emma Hughes; Keeping Up with the Joneses – Megan Rubens, Michael Pearce and Selina Lim; Orbit Ever After – Chee-Lan Chan, Jamie Stone and Len Rowles; Sea View – Anna Duffield and Jane Linfoot
Best Animated Film: Frozen – Chris Buck and Jennifer Lee; Despicable Me 2 – Chris Renaud and Pierre Coffin; Monsters University – Dan Scanlon	Best Documentary: The Act of Killing – Joshua Oppenheimer; The Armstrong Lie – Alex Gibney; Blackfish – Gabriela Cowperthwaite; Tim's Vermeer – Teller, Penn Jillette and Farley Ziegler; We Steal Secrets: The Story of WikiLeaks – Alex Gibney
Best Film Not in the English Language: The Great Beauty – Paolo Sorrentino, Nicola Giuliano and Francesca Cima; The Act of Killing – Joshua Oppenheimer and Signe Byrge Sørensen; Blue Is the Warmest Colour – Abdellatif Kechiche, Brahim Chioua and Vincent Maraval; Metro Manila – Sean Ellis and Mathilde Charpentier; Wadjda – Haifaa al-Mansour, Gerhard Meixner and Roman Paul	Rising Star Award: Will Poulter; Dane DeHaan; George MacKay; Lupita Nyong'o; Léa Seydoux

== Statistics ==
Films that received multiple nominations
Nominations	Film
11	Gravity
10	12 Years a Slave
10	American Hustle
9	Captain Phillips
5	Behind the Candelabra
5	Saving Mr. Banks
4	Philomena
4	Rush
4	The Wolf of Wall Street
3	Blue Jasmine
3	The Great Gatsby
3	Inside Llewyn Davis
3	Nebraska
2	The Act of Killing
2	The Butler
2	The Hobbit: The Desolation of Smaug

Films that received multiple awards
Awards	Film
6	Gravity
3	American Hustle
2	12 Years a Slave
2	The Great Gatsby

== In Memoriam ==
- Shirley Temple
- Joan Fontaine
- Elmore Leonard
- Saul Zaentz
- Julie Harris
- Ray Dolby
- Graham Stark
- Stephenie McMillan
- Philip Seymour Hoffman
- Eileen Brennan
- Ray Harryhausen
- David Campling
- Maximilian Schell
- Esther Williams
- Jean Kent
- Gerry Hambling
- Ruth Prawer Jhabvala
- Vic Hammond
- Eleanor Parker
- Bryan Forbes
- Anwar Brett
- Run Run Shaw
- Paul Walker
- Deanna Durbin
- Antonia Bird
- Peter O'Toole

== See also ==
- 3rd AACTA International Awards
- 86th Academy Awards
- 39th César Awards
- 19th Critics' Choice Awards
- 66th Directors Guild of America Awards
- 27th European Film Awards
- 71st Golden Globe Awards
- 34th Golden Raspberry Awards
- 28th Goya Awards
- 29th Independent Spirit Awards
- 19th Lumière Awards
- 4th Magritte Awards
- 1st Platino Awards
- 25th Producers Guild of America Awards
- 18th Satellite Awards
- 40th Saturn Awards
- 20th Screen Actors Guild Awards
- 66th Writers Guild of America Awards
