= 19th Critics' Choice Awards =

2014 US film awards

- Date: January 16, 2014
- Site: Barker Hangar, Santa Monica, California, United States
- Hosted by: Aisha Tyler
- Official website: www.criticschoice.com

Highlights
- Best Film: 12 Years a Slave
- Most awards: Gravity (7)
- Most nominations: 12 Years a Slave & American Hustle (13)

Television coverage
- Network: The CW

The 19th Critics' Choice Awards were presented on January 16, 2014, at the Barker Hangar at the Santa Monica Airport, honoring the finest achievements of 2013 filmmaking. The ceremony was broadcast on The CW and hosted by Aisha Tyler. The nominees were announced on December 16, 2013.

== Winners and nominees ==
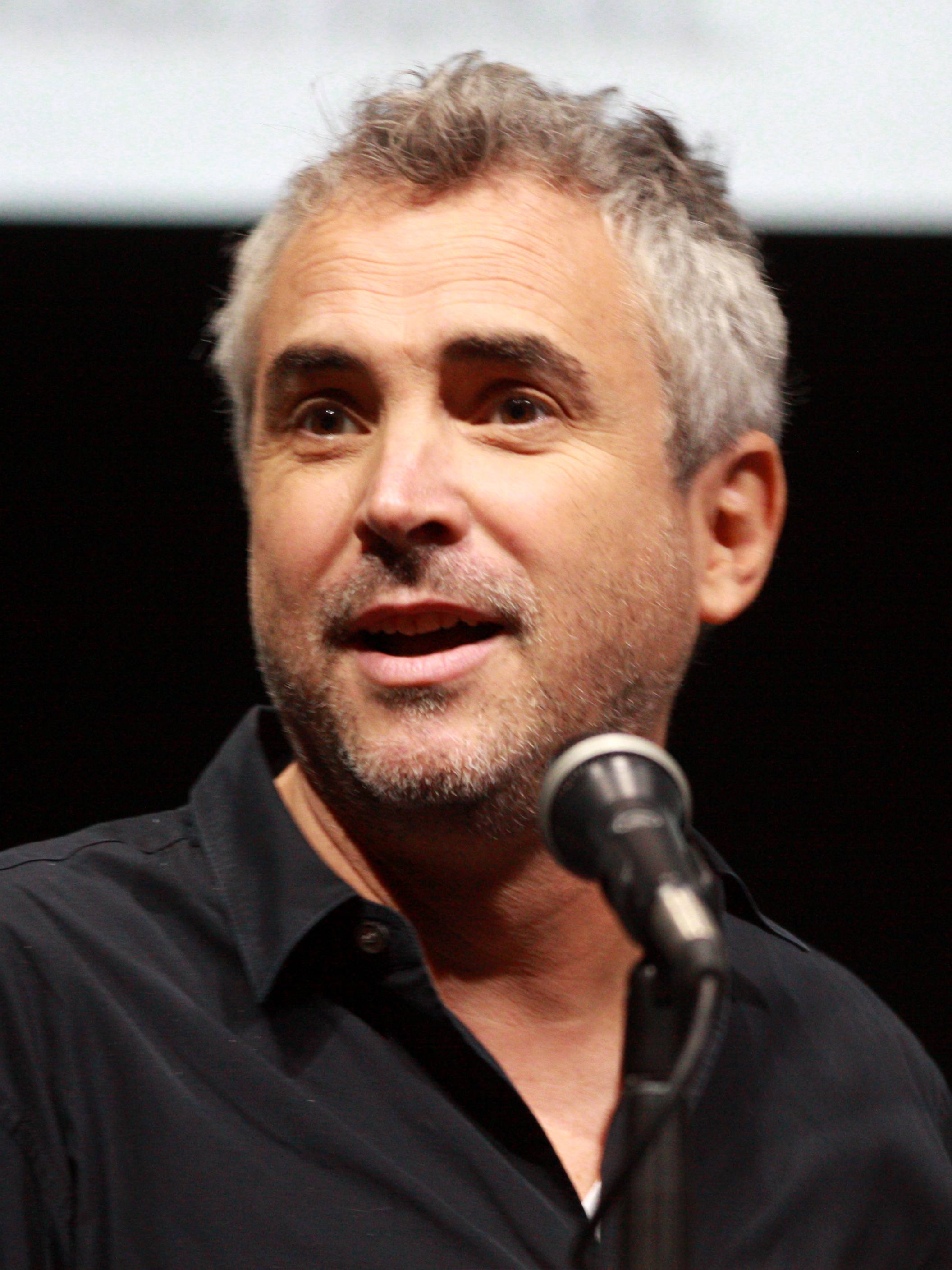
Alfonso Cuarón, Best Director winner and Best Editing co-winner

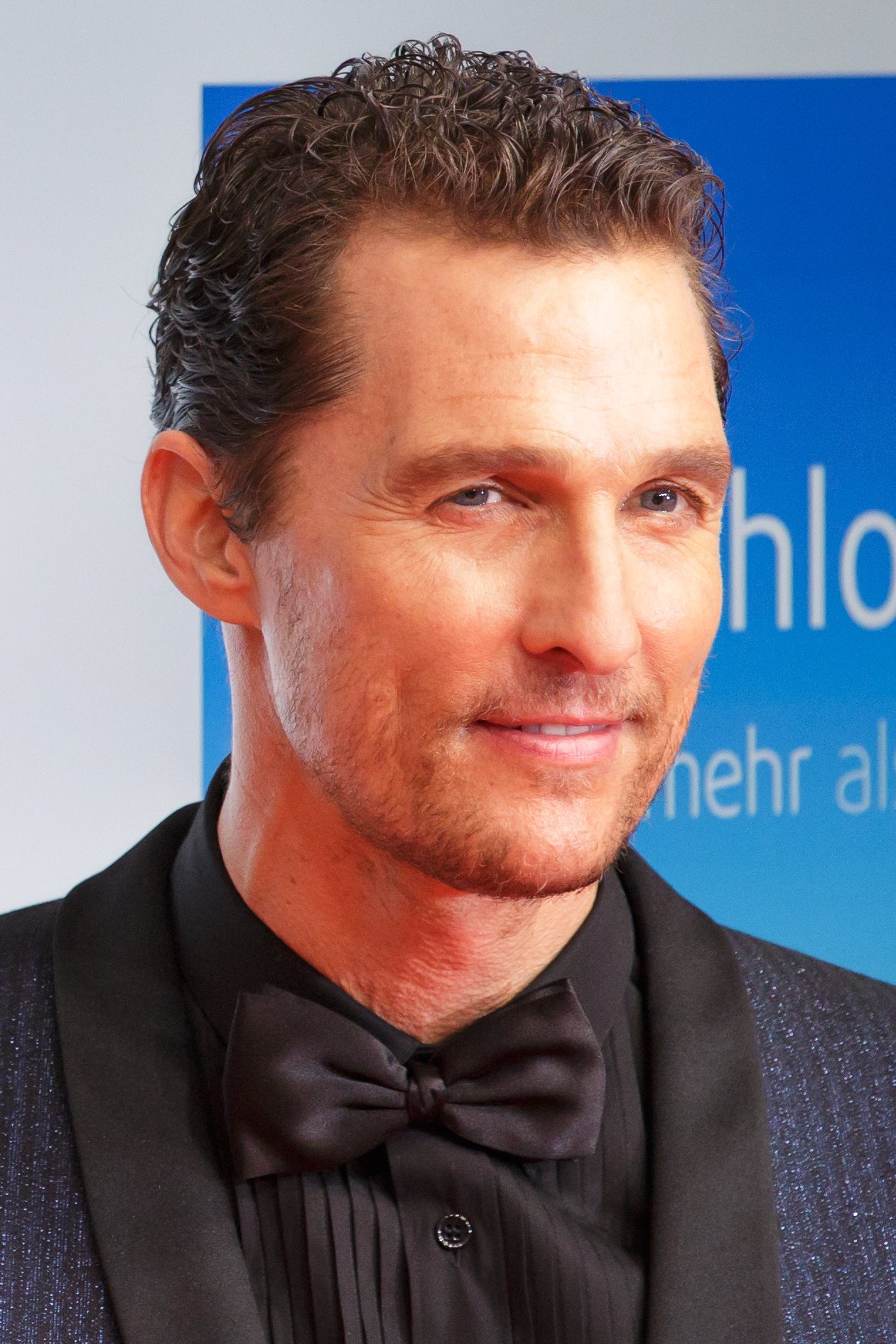
Matthew McConaughey, Best Actor winner

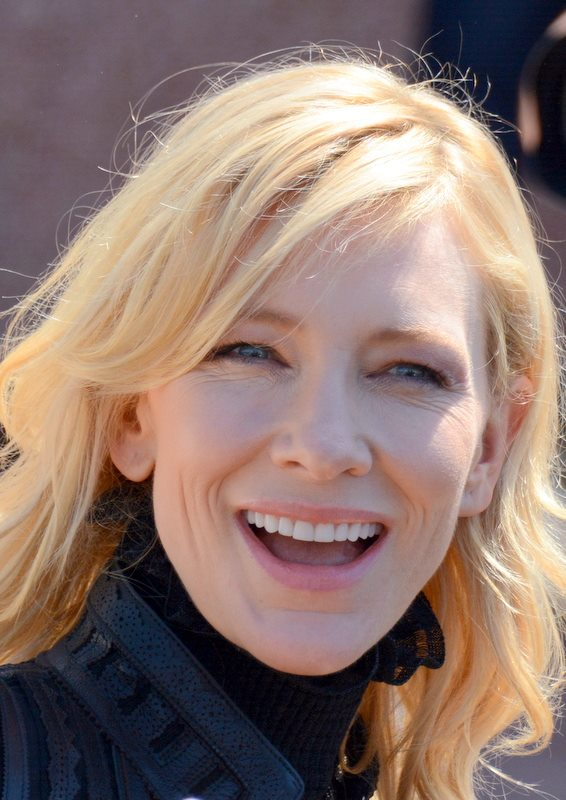
Cate Blanchett, Best Actress winner

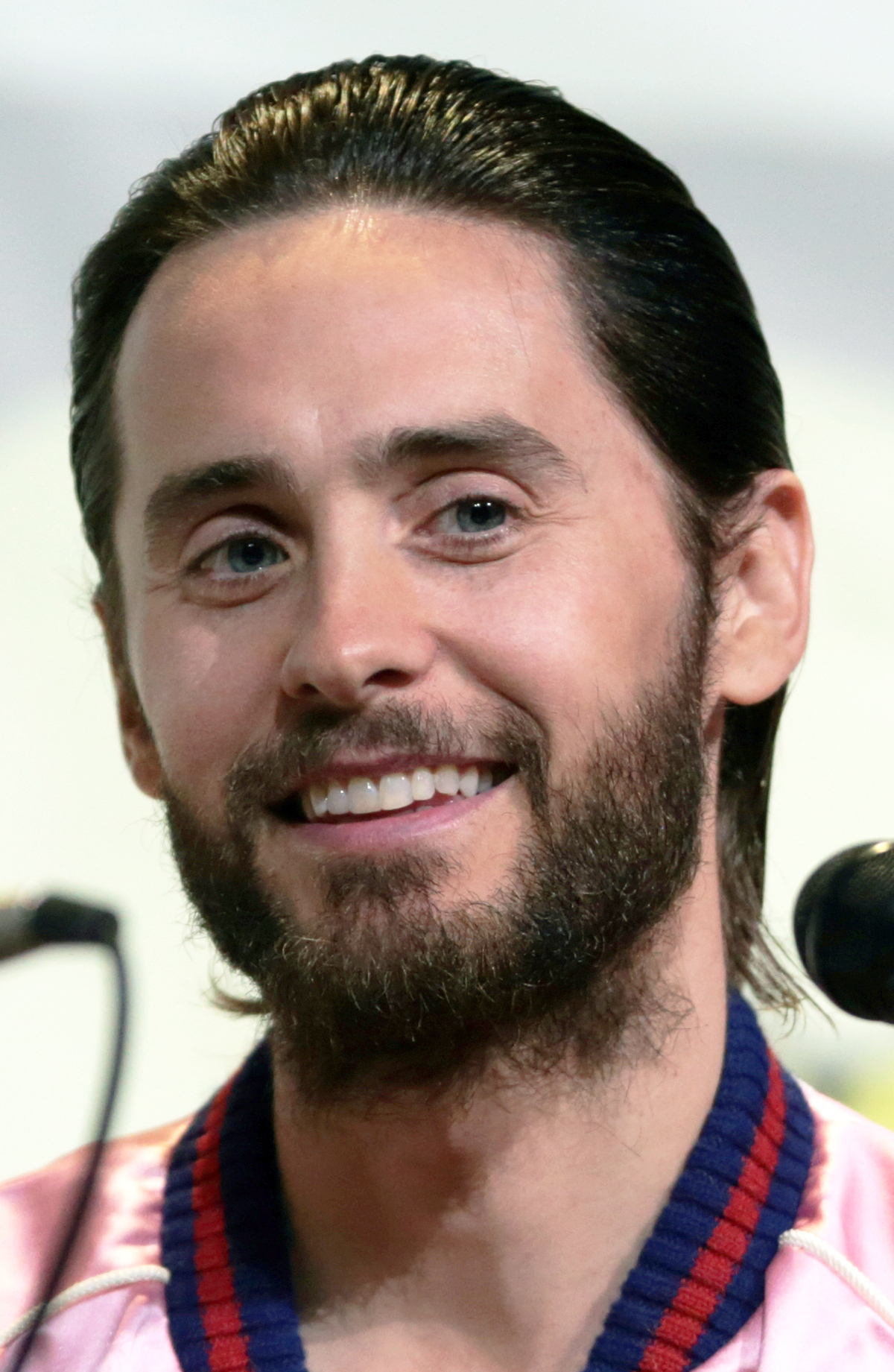
Jared Leto, Best Supporting Actor winner

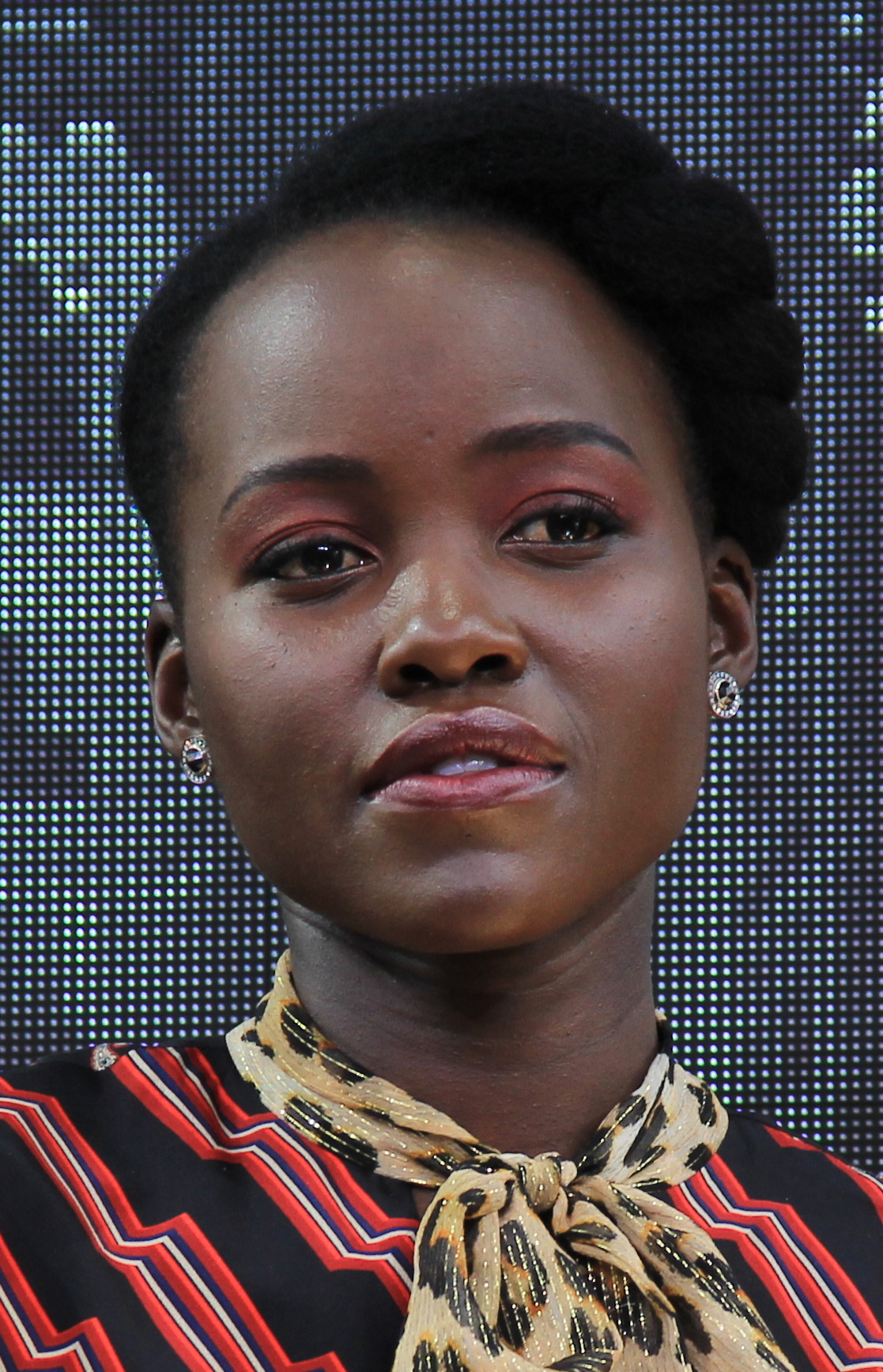
Lupita Nyong'o, Best Supporting Actress winner

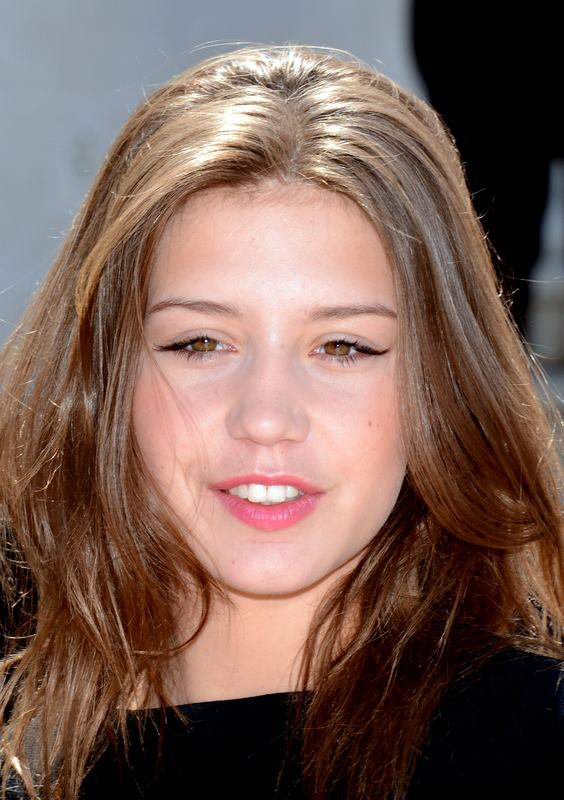
Adèle Exarchopoulos, Best Young Actor/Actress winner

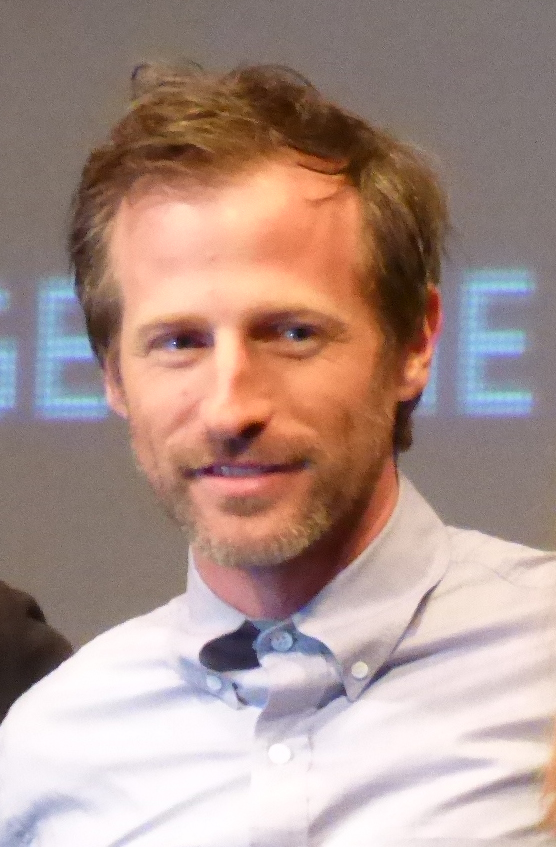
Spike Jonze, Best Original Screenplay winner

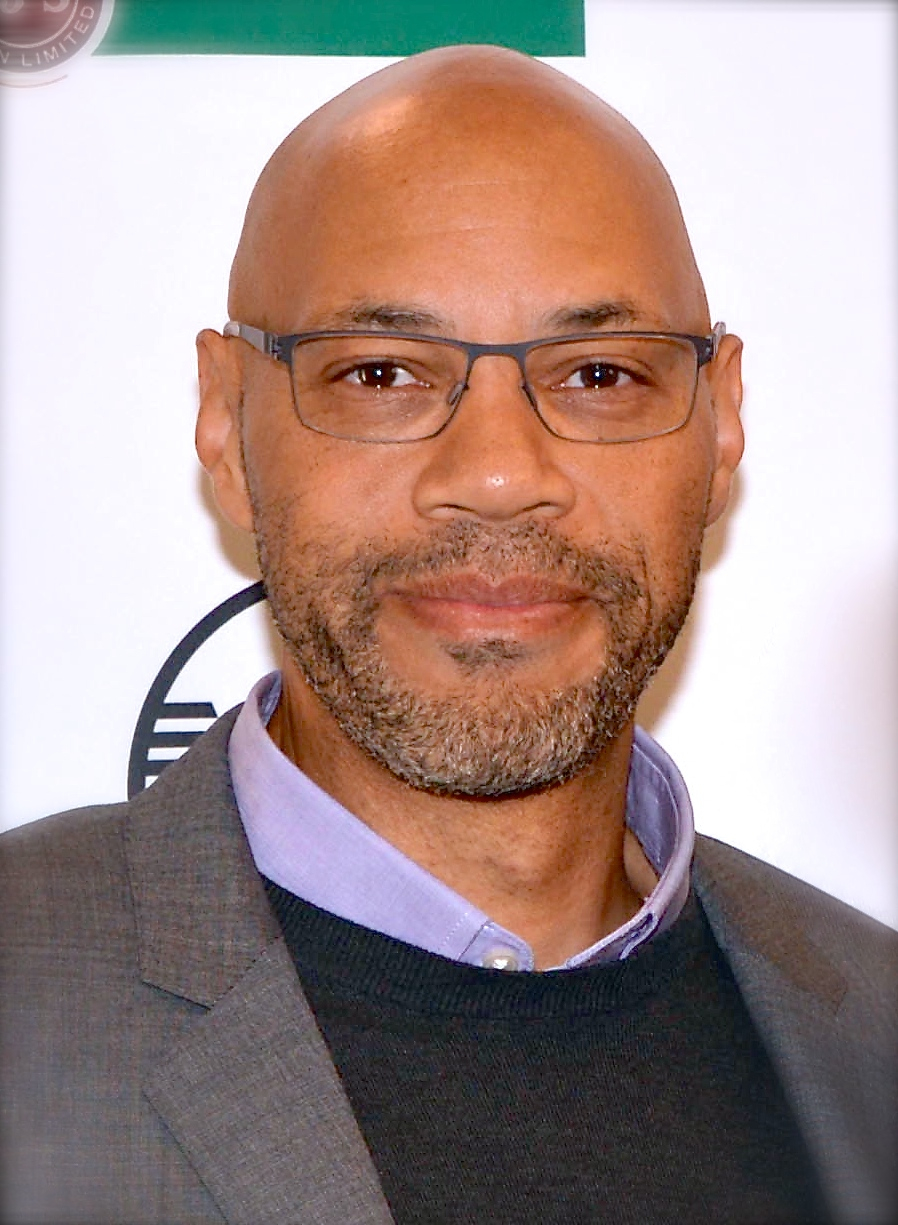
John Ridley, Best Adapted Screenplay winner

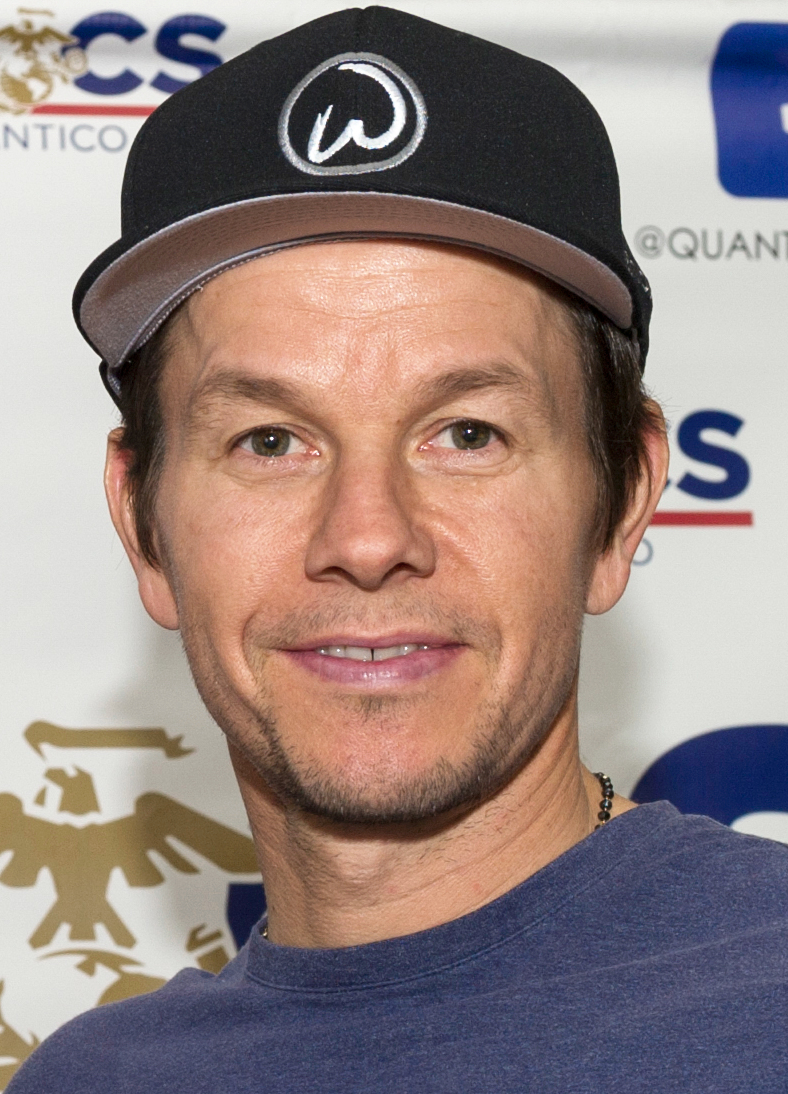
Mark Wahlberg, Best Actor in an Action Movie winner

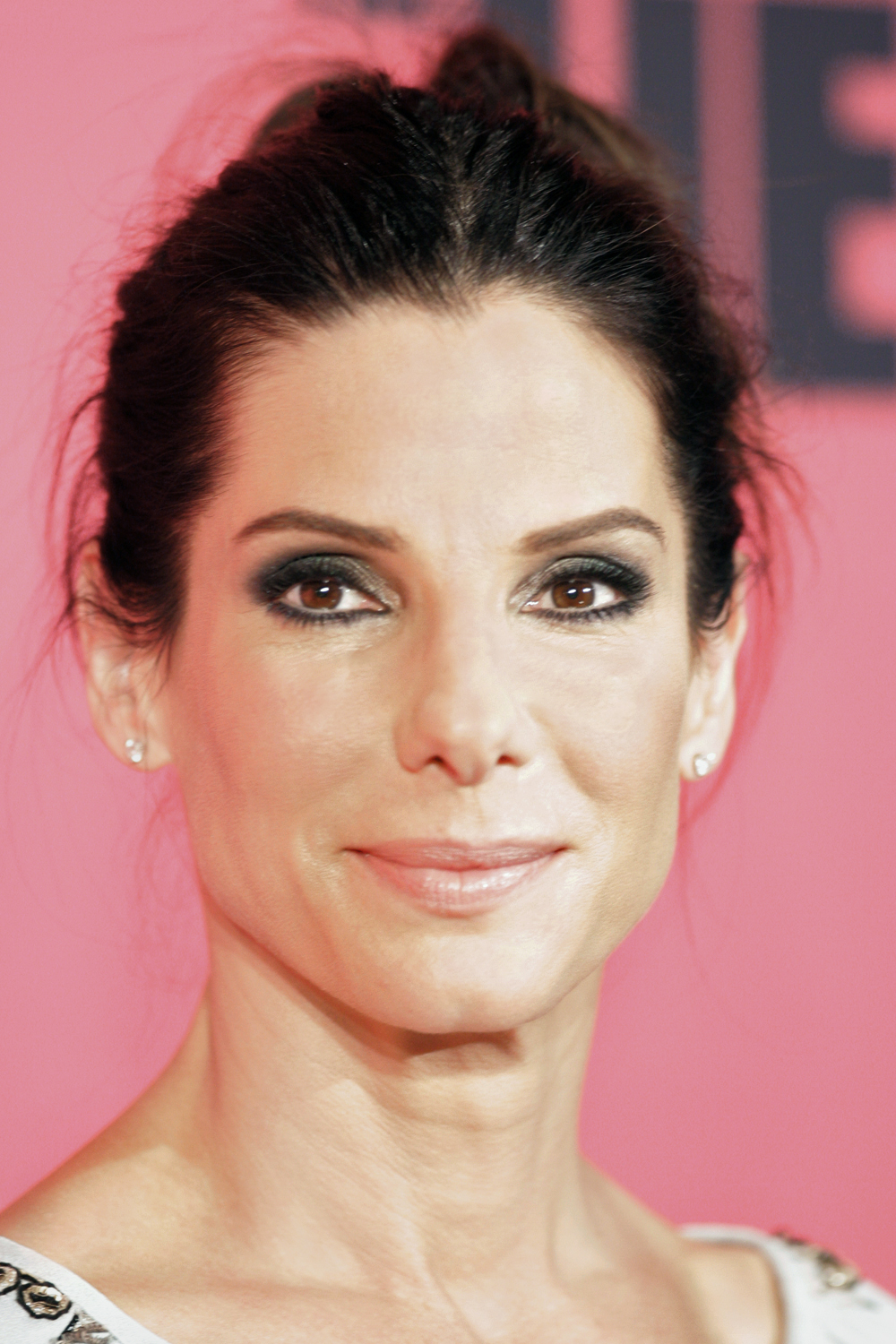
Sandra Bullock, Best Actress in an Action Movie winner

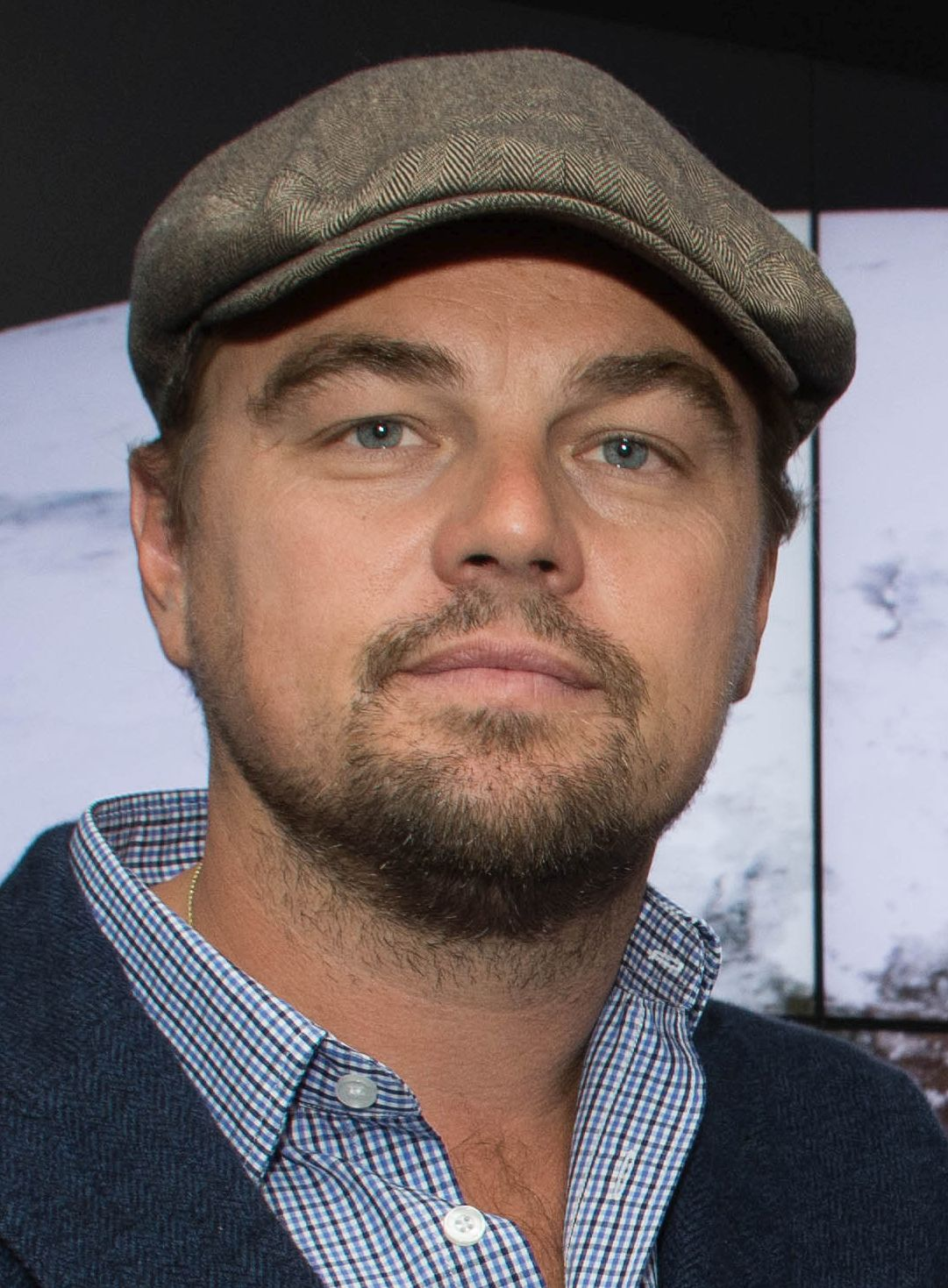
Leonardo DiCaprio, Best Actor in a Comedy Movie winner

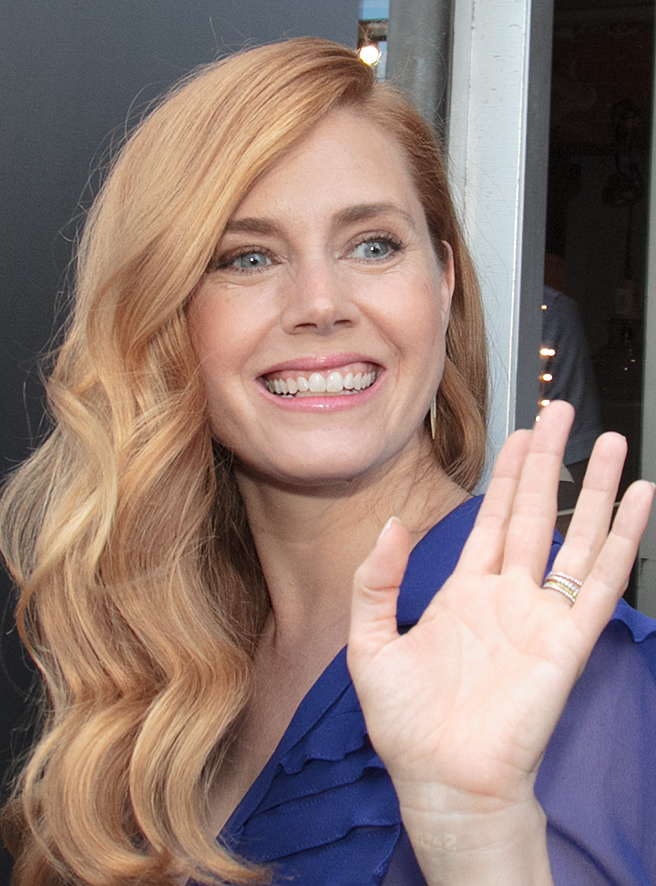
Amy Adams, Best Actress in a Comedy Movie winner

Best Picture 12 Years a Slave: American Hustle; Captain Phillips; Dallas Buyers Club; Gravity; Her; Inside Llewyn Davis; Nebraska; Saving Mr. Banks; The Wolf of Wall Street	Best Director Alfonso Cuarón – Gravity: Paul Greengrass – Captain Phillips; Spike Jonze – Her; Steve McQueen – 12 Years a Slave; David O. Russell – American Hustle; Martin Scorsese – The Wolf of Wall Street
Best Actor Matthew McConaughey – Dallas Buyers Club as Ron Woodroof: Christian Bale – American Hustle as Irving Rosenfeld; Bruce Dern – Nebraska as Woodrow "Woody" Grant; Chiwetel Ejiofor – 12 Years a Slave as Solomon Northup; Tom Hanks – Captain Phillips as Captain Richard Phillips; Robert Redford – All Is Lost as Our Man	Best Actress Cate Blanchett – Blue Jasmine as Jeanette "Jasmine" Francis: Sandra Bullock – Gravity as Dr. Ryan Stone; Judi Dench – Philomena as Philomena Lee; Brie Larson – Short Term 12 as Grace Howard; Meryl Streep – August: Osage County as Violet Weston; Emma Thompson – Saving Mr. Banks as P. L. Travers
Best Supporting Actor Jared Leto – Dallas Buyers Club as Rayon: Barkhad Abdi – Captain Phillips as Abduwali Muse; Daniel Brühl – Rush as Niki Lauda; Bradley Cooper – American Hustle as Richie DiMaso; Michael Fassbender – 12 Years a Slave as Edwin Epps; James Gandolfini – Enough Said as Albert (posthumous)	Best Supporting Actress Lupita Nyong'o – 12 Years a Slave as Patsey: Scarlett Johansson – Her as Samantha; Jennifer Lawrence – American Hustle as Rosalyn Rosenfeld; Julia Roberts – August: Osage County as Barbara Weston-Fordham; June Squibb – Nebraska as Kate Grant; Oprah Winfrey – Lee Daniels' The Butler as Gloria Gaines
Best Young Actor/Actress Adèle Exarchopoulos – Blue Is the Warmest Colour as Adèle: Asa Butterfield – Ender's Game as Ender Wiggin; Liam James – The Way, Way Back as Duncan; Sophie Nélisse – The Book Thief as Liesel Meminger; Tye Sheridan – Mud as Ellis	Best Acting Ensemble American Hustle: 12 Years a Slave; August: Osage County; Lee Daniels' The Butler; Nebraska; The Wolf of Wall Street
Best Original Screenplay Her – Spike Jonze: American Hustle – David O. Russell and Eric Warren Singer; Blue Jasmine – Woody Allen; Inside Llewyn Davis – Joel Coen and Ethan Coen; Nebraska – Bob Nelson	Best Adapted Screenplay 12 Years a Slave – John Ridley: August: Osage County – Tracy Letts; Before Midnight – Richard Linklater, Julie Delpy, and Ethan Hawke; Captain Phillips – Billy Ray; Philomena – Steve Coogan and Jeff Pope; The Wolf of Wall Street – Terence Winter
Best Animated Feature Frozen: The Croods; Despicable Me 2; Monsters University; The Wind Rises	Best Action Movie Lone Survivor: The Hunger Games: Catching Fire; Iron Man 3; Rush; Star Trek Into Darkness
Best Actor in an Action Movie Mark Wahlberg – Lone Survivor as Marcus Luttrell: Henry Cavill – Man of Steel as Clark Kent / Kal-El; Robert Downey Jr. – Iron Man 3 as Tony Stark / Iron Man; Brad Pitt – World War Z as Gerry Lane	Best Actress in an Action Movie Sandra Bullock – Gravity as Dr. Ryan Stone: Jennifer Lawrence – The Hunger Games: Catching Fire as Katniss Everdeen; Evangeline Lilly – The Hobbit: The Desolation of Smaug as Tauriel; Gwyneth Paltrow – Iron Man 3 as Pepper Potts
Best Documentary Feature 20 Feet from Stardom: The Act of Killing; Blackfish; Stories We Tell; Tim's Vermeer	Best Comedy Movie American Hustle: Enough Said; The Heat; This Is the End; The Way, Way Back; The World's End
Best Actor in a Comedy Movie Leonardo DiCaprio – The Wolf of Wall Street as Jordan Belfort: Christian Bale – American Hustle as Irving Rosenfeld; James Gandolfini – Enough Said as Albert; Simon Pegg – The World's End as Gary King; Sam Rockwell – The Way, Way Back as Owen	Best Actress in a Comedy Movie Amy Adams – American Hustle as Sydney Prosser: Sandra Bullock – The Heat as Sarah Ashburn; Greta Gerwig – Frances Ha as Frances Halladay; Julia Louis-Dreyfus – Enough Said as Eva; Melissa McCarthy – The Heat as Shannon Mullins
Best Sci-Fi/Horror Movie Gravity: The Conjuring; Star Trek Into Darkness; World War Z	Best Foreign Language Film Blue Is the Warmest Colour • Belgium / France / Spain: The Great Beauty • France / Italy; The Hunt • Denmark; The Past • France / Iran / Italy; Wadjda • Germany / Saudi Arabia
Best Art Direction The Great Gatsby – Catherine Martin (Production Designer) and Beverley Dunn (Set Decorator): 12 Years a Slave – Adam Stockhausen (Production Designer) and Alice Baker (Set Decorator); Gravity – Andy Nicholson (Production Designer) and Rosie Goodwin (Set Decorator); Her – K. K. Barrett (Production Designer) and Gene Serdena (Set Decorator); The Hobbit: The Desolation of Smaug – Dan Hennah (Production Designer), Simon Bright (Set Decorator), and Ra Vincent (Set Decorator)	Best Cinematography Gravity – Emmanuel Lubezki: 12 Years a Slave – Sean Bobbitt; Inside Llewyn Davis – Bruno Delbonnel; Nebraska – Phedon Papamichael; Prisoners – Roger Deakins
Best Costume Design The Great Gatsby – Catherine Martin: 12 Years a Slave – Patricia Norris; American Hustle – Michael Wilkinson; The Hobbit: The Desolation of Smaug – Bob Buck, Ann Maskrey, and Richard Taylor; Saving Mr. Banks – Daniel Orlandi	Best Editing Gravity – Alfonso Cuarón and Mark Sanger: 12 Years a Slave – Joe Walker; American Hustle – Alan Baumgarten, Jay Cassidy, and Crispin Struthers; Captain Phillips – Christopher Rouse; Rush – Daniel P. Hanley and Mike Hill; The Wolf of Wall Street – Thelma Schoonmaker
Best Score Gravity – Steven Price: 12 Years a Slave – Hans Zimmer; Her – Arcade Fire; Saving Mr. Banks – Thomas Newman	Best Song "Let It Go" – Frozen: "Atlas" – The Hunger Games: Catching Fire; "Happy" – Despicable Me 2; "Ordinary Love" – Mandela: Long Walk to Freedom; "Please Mr. Kennedy" – Inside Llewyn Davis; "Young and Beautiful" – The Great Gatsby
Best Hair and Makeup American Hustle: 12 Years a Slave; The Hobbit: The Desolation of Smaug; Lee Daniels' The Butler; Rush	Best Visual Effects Gravity: The Hobbit: The Desolation of Smaug; Iron Man 3; Pacific Rim; Star Trek Into Darkness

=== Joel Siegel Award ===
Forest Whitaker

=== Louis XIII Genius Award ===
Richard Linklater, Julie Delpy, and Ethan Hawke – The Before Trilogy (Before Sunrise, Before Sunset, and Before Midnight)

== Statistics ==
Nominations	Film
13	12 Years a Slave
13	American Hustle
10	Gravity
6	Captain Phillips
6	Her
6	Nebraska
6	The Wolf of Wall Street
5	The Hobbit: The Desolation of Smaug
4	August: Osage County
4	Enough Said
4	Inside Llewyn Davis
4	Iron Man 3
4	Rush
4	Saving Mr. Banks
3	Dallas Buyers Club
3	The Great Gatsby
3	The Heat
3	The Hunger Games: Catching Fire
3	Lee Daniels' The Butler
3	Star Trek Into Darkness
3	The Way, Way Back
2	Blue Is the Warmest Colour
2	Blue Jasmine
2	Despicable Me 2
2	Frozen
2	Lone Survivor
2	Philomena
2	The World's End
2	World War Z

Wins	Film
7	Gravity
4	American Hustle
3	12 Years a Slave
2	Blue Is the Warmest Colour
2	Dallas Buyers Club
2	Frozen
2	The Great Gatsby
2	Lone Survivor
