= Room 8 (film) =

2013 short film

Room 8 is a short, six-minutes-long film that was one of several short films that won the Bombay Sapphire's Imagination Series. The film is based on a script by Oscar-winning screenwriter Geoffrey S. Fletcher. After Fletcher completed the dialogue, the script (without stage direction) was released and contestants would create their film using this dialogue. Room 8 was directed by James W. Griffiths, editing student of National Film and Television School. Griffiths won £40,000 from Bombay Sapphire to make the film. Although Room 8 takes place in London, it was filmed in Poland due to cost restraints. It premiered at the Tribeca Film Festival and later won the BAFTA Award for Best Short Film at the 67th British Academy Film Awards. It was the first and only branded film to win the award.

== Plot summary ==
A man (credited as "Ives") is placed in a prison cell, where another man ("Shears") is fiddling with a wiggling matchbox on his desk, which he places in his desk drawer. Ives notices a large red box on the bunk bed; on his inquiry, Shears warns he might regret opening it. Upon opening it, the box is revealed to have an exact replica of the prison cell, but as Ives reaches in, he realizes it's not just the replica, it's the prison cell itself, as his giant hand appears to reach in the same cell he is currently sitting in. Ives then climbs out of the open box and – now appearing as a tiny version of himself in the prison cell – makes a run for it, only for Shears to trap him in another matchbox and throw him into the drawer among dozens of other matchboxes, and calling out to the prison guards for the next prisoner.
