= 2013 Los Angeles Film Critics Association Awards =

Annual US film awards ceremony

39th LAFCA Awards
- Date: December 8, 2013

Highlights
- Best Picture: Gravity and Her (TIE)

The 39th Los Angeles Film Critics Association Awards, given by the Los Angeles Film Critics Association (LAFCA), honored the best in film for 2013.

== Winners ==
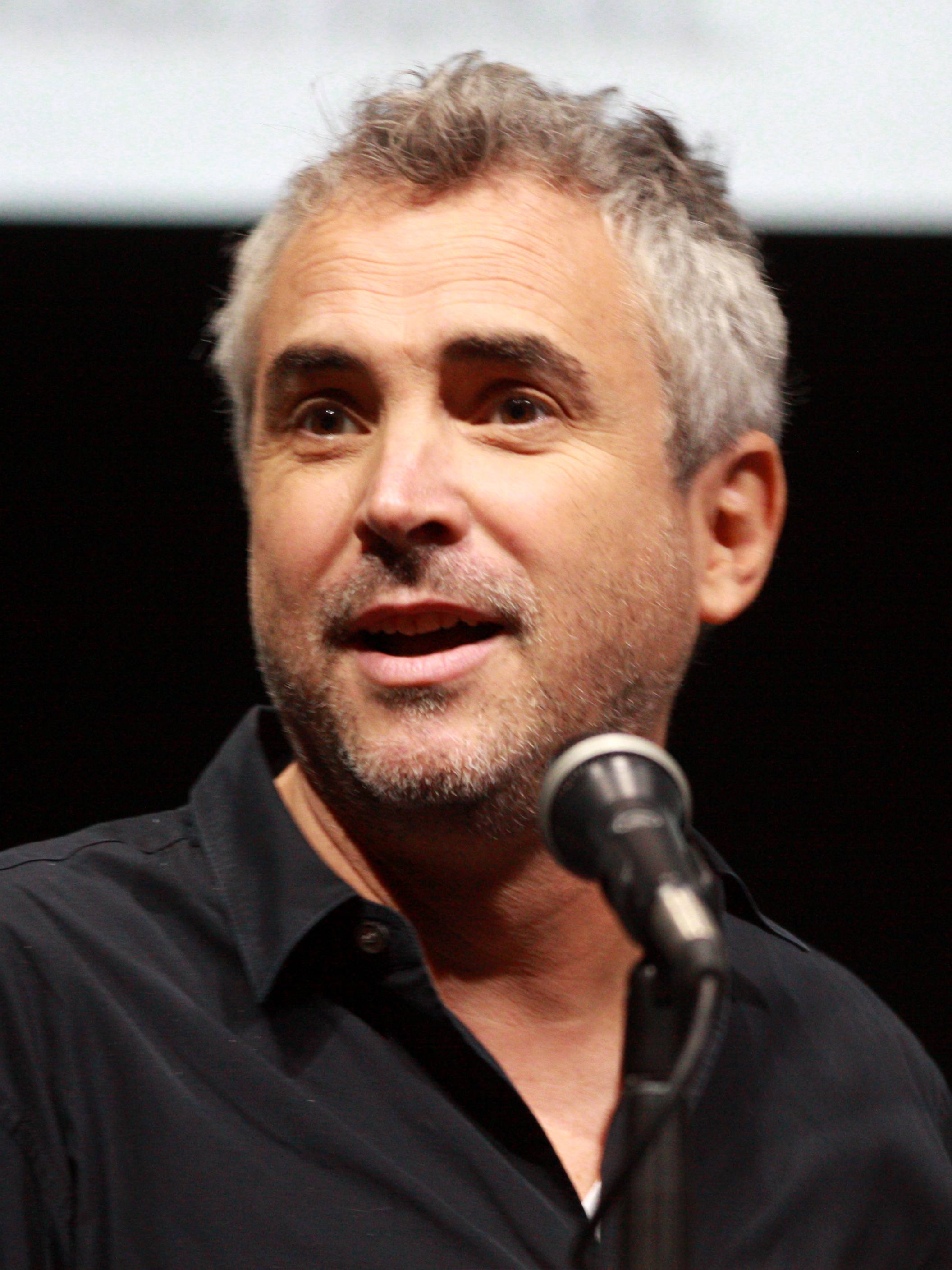
Alfonso Cuarón, Best Director winner

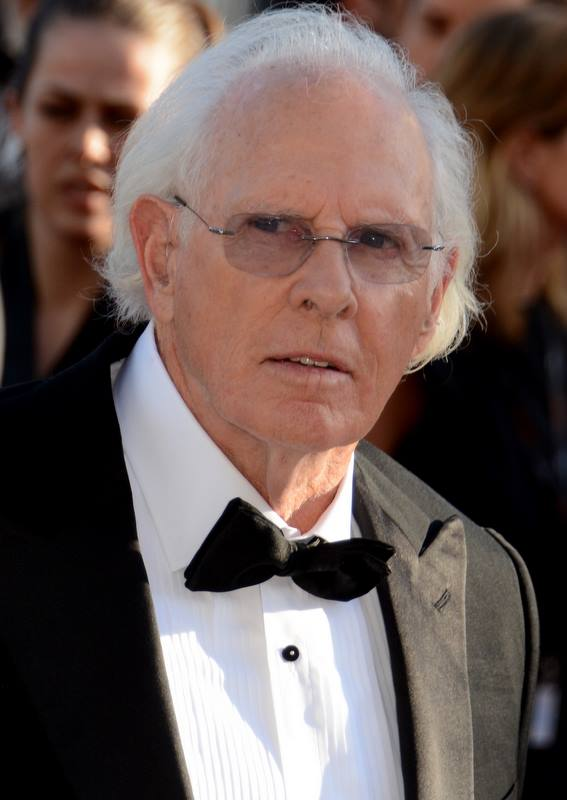
Bruce Dern, Best Actor winner

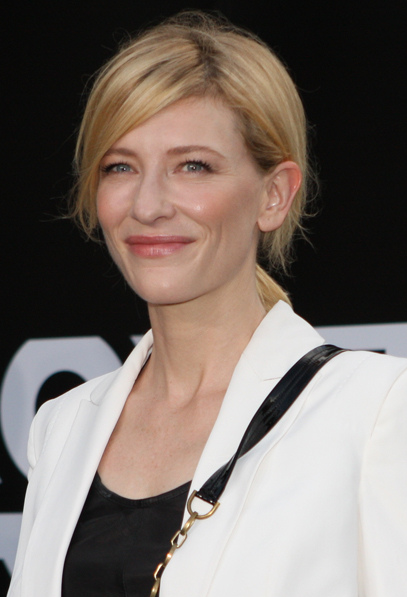
Cate Blanchett, Best Actress co-winner

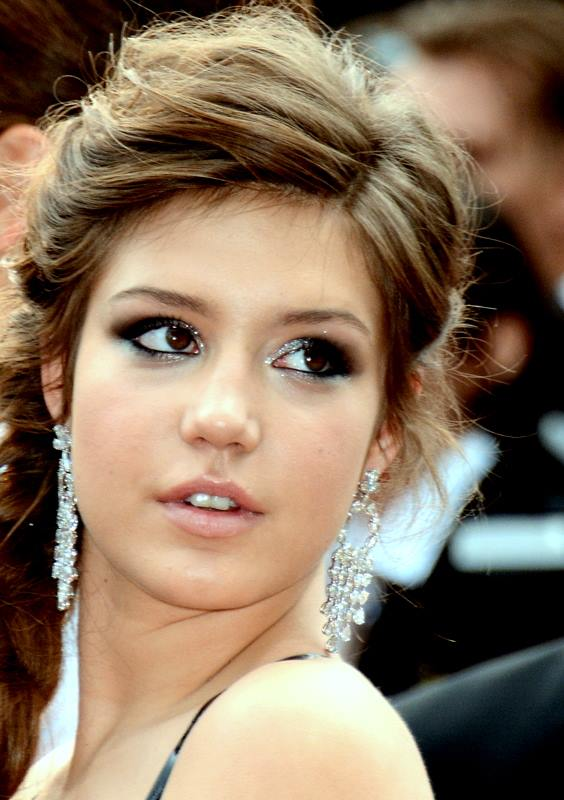
Adèle Exarchopoulos, Best Actress co-winner

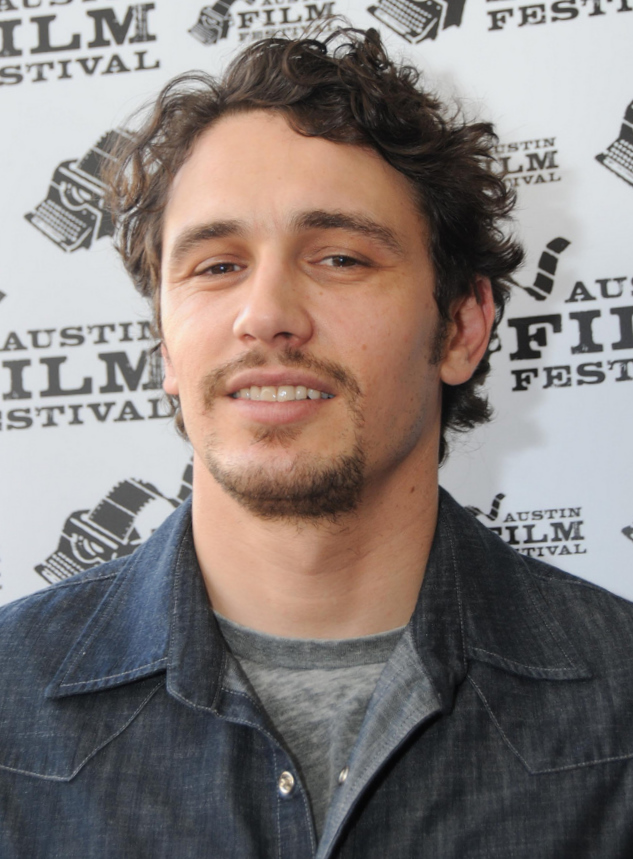
James Franco, Best Supporting Actor co-winner

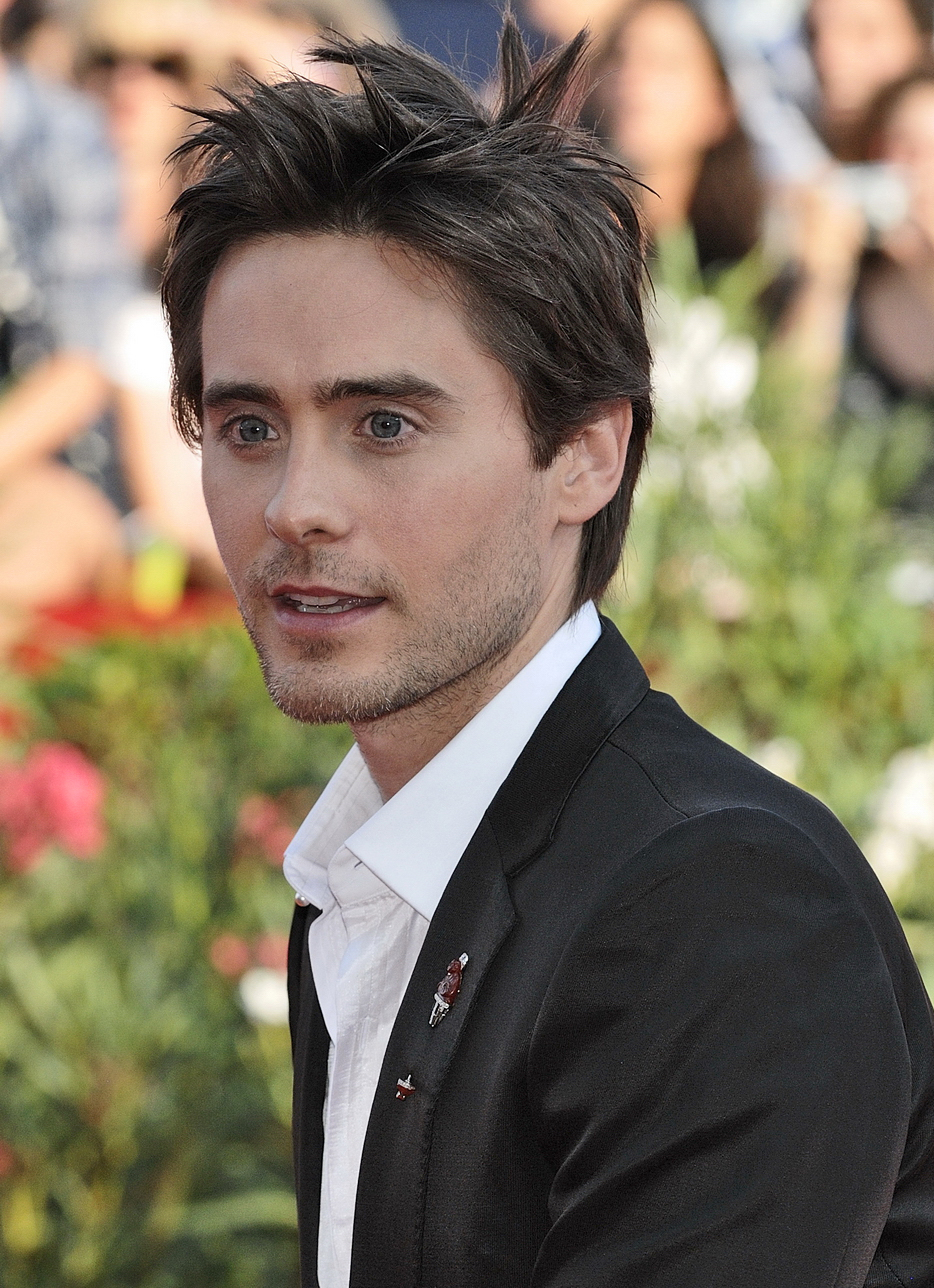
Jared Leto, Best Supporting Actor co-winner

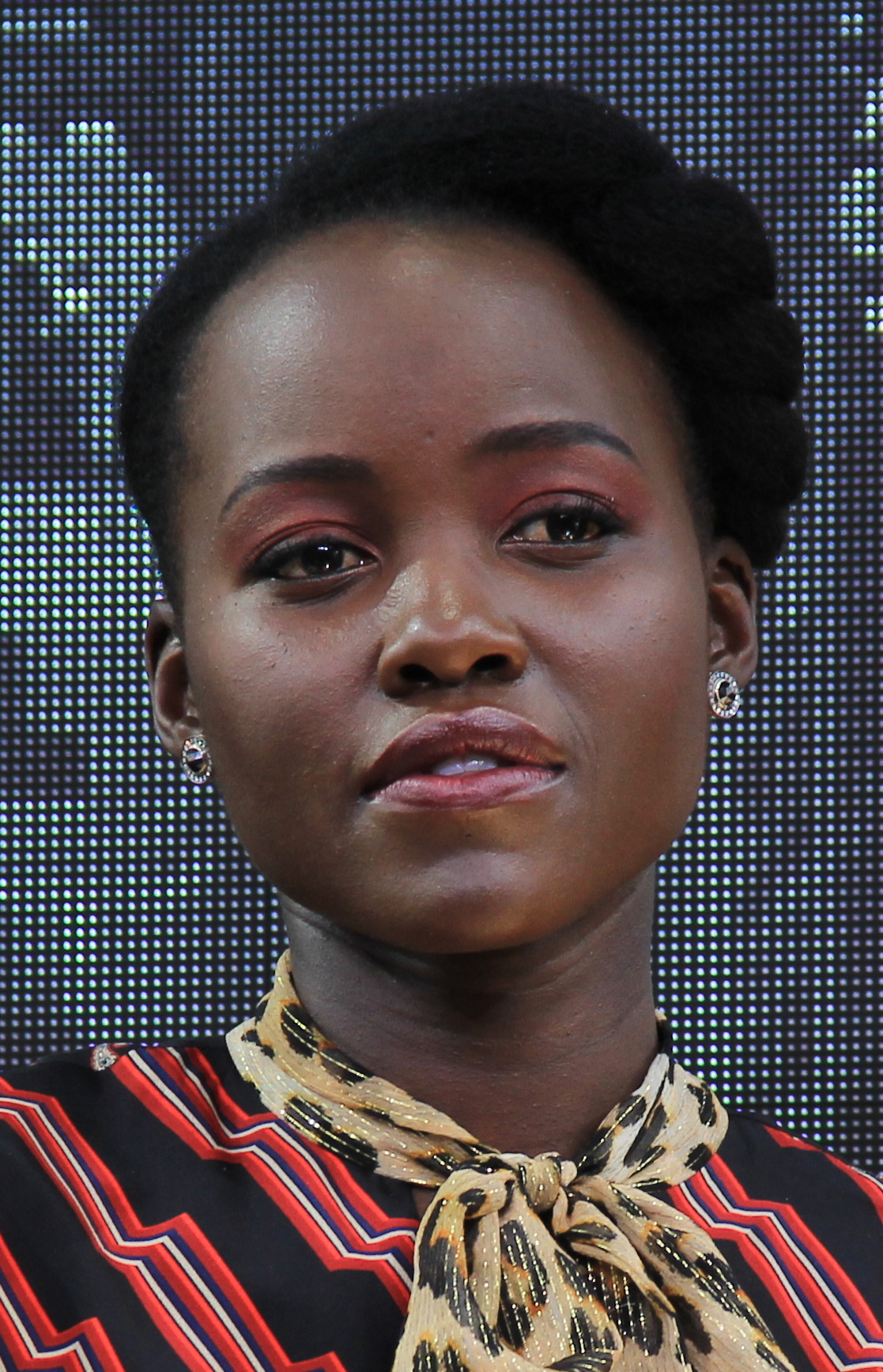
Lupita Nyong'o, Best Supporting Actress winner

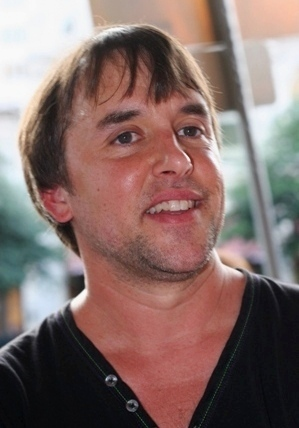
Richard Linklater, Best Screenplay co-winner

- Best Picture (TIE):
  - Gravity
  - Her
- Best Director:
  - Alfonso Cuarón – Gravity
  - Runner-up: Spike Jonze – Her
- Best Actor:
  - Bruce Dern – Nebraska
  - Runner-up: Chiwetel Ejiofor – 12 Years a Slave
- Best Actress (TIE):
  - Cate Blanchett – Blue Jasmine
  - Adèle Exarchopoulos – Blue Is the Warmest Colour
- Best Supporting Actor (TIE):
  - James Franco – Spring Breakers
  - Jared Leto – Dallas Buyers Club
- Best Supporting Actress:
  - Lupita Nyong'o – 12 Years a Slave
  - Runner-up: June Squibb – Nebraska
- Best Screenplay:
  - Richard Linklater, Ethan Hawke, and Julie Delpy – Before Midnight
  - Runner-up: Spike Jonze – Her
- Best Cinematography:
  - Emmanuel Lubezki – Gravity
  - Runner-up: Bruno Delbonnel – Inside Llewyn Davis
- Best Editing:
  - Alfonso Cuarón and Mark Sanger – Gravity
  - Runner-up: Shane Carruth and David Lowery – Upstream Color
- Best Production Design:
  - K. K. Barrett – Her
  - Runner-up: Jess Gonchor – Inside Llewyn Davis
- Best Music Score:
  - T Bone Burnett – Inside Llewyn Davis
  - Runner-up: Arcade Fire and Owen Pallett – Her
- Best Foreign Language Film:
  - Blue Is the Warmest Colour • France
  - Runner-up: The Great Beauty • Italy
- Best Documentary/Non-Fiction Film:
  - Stories We Tell
  - Runner-up: The Act of Killing
- Best Animation:
  - Ernest & Celestine
  - Runner-up: The Wind Rises
- New Generation Award:
  - Megan Ellison
- Career Achievement Award:
  - Richard Lester
- The Douglas Edwards Experimental/Independent Film/Video Award:
  - Charlotte Pryce – Cabinets of Wonder: Films and a Performance by Charlotte Pryce
