= Dave Shirk =

Visual effects supervisor

- Other name: David Shirk
- Occupation: visual effects supervisor
- Years active: 2005-present

Dave Shirk is an American visual effects supervisor. Shirk and his fellow visual effects artists won the Academy Award for Best Visual Effects for the 2013 film Gravity. He was also nominated for the 2018 film Ready Player One.
