= Christopher Benstead =

British film composer, arranger and sound engineer

- Born: Kingston upon Hull
- Occupation: Composer
- Years active: 2004-present

Christopher Benstead is a British film composer, arranger and Academy-Award winning re-recording mixer.

Collaborating extensively with director Guy Ritchie, Benstead composed the score for the feature The Ministry of Ungentlemanly Warfare, starring Henry Cavill, and the much anticipated Netflix series The Gentlemen, a follow-up to the 2019 film that Benstead also scored. His music for Guy Ritchie's The Covenant, starring Jake Gyllenhaal, and the Jason Statham thrillers Operation Fortune: Ruse de Guerre and Wrath of Man were received to much critical acclaim.

He also arranged and composed additional music for Guy Ritchie's Aladdin, alongside legendary songwriter and composer Alan Menken, and produced and arranged the songs in the film, working with Will Smith to create re-imagined versions of the original's songs. He also arranged the title music for Guy Ritchies Young Sherlock based on Kasabians 'Days are forgotten'.

Benstead composed additional music for Beauty and the Beast, working closely with Alan Menken and director Bill Condon.

He received Oscar and BAFTA awards for his work as re-recording mixer on Alfonso Cuaron’s 2013 film Gravity, starring Sandra Bullock and George Clooney.

Benstead was presented the Vice-Chancellor’s Alumni Award for his music mixing on Gravity.
