= Chris Munro =

British sound engineer

- Occupation: Sound engineer
- Years active: 1972–present

Chris Munro is a British sound engineer. He has won two Academy Awards for Best Sound and has been nominated for three more in the same category. He has worked on over 80 films since 1972.

== Selected filmography ==
Munro has won two Academy Awards for Best Sound and has been nominated for three other films:

Won

- Black Hawk Down (2001)
- Gravity (2013)

Nominated

- The Mummy (1999)
- Captain Phillips (2013)
- Mission: Impossible – Dead Reckoning Part One (2023)
