= Andy Nicholson (production designer) =

English production designer

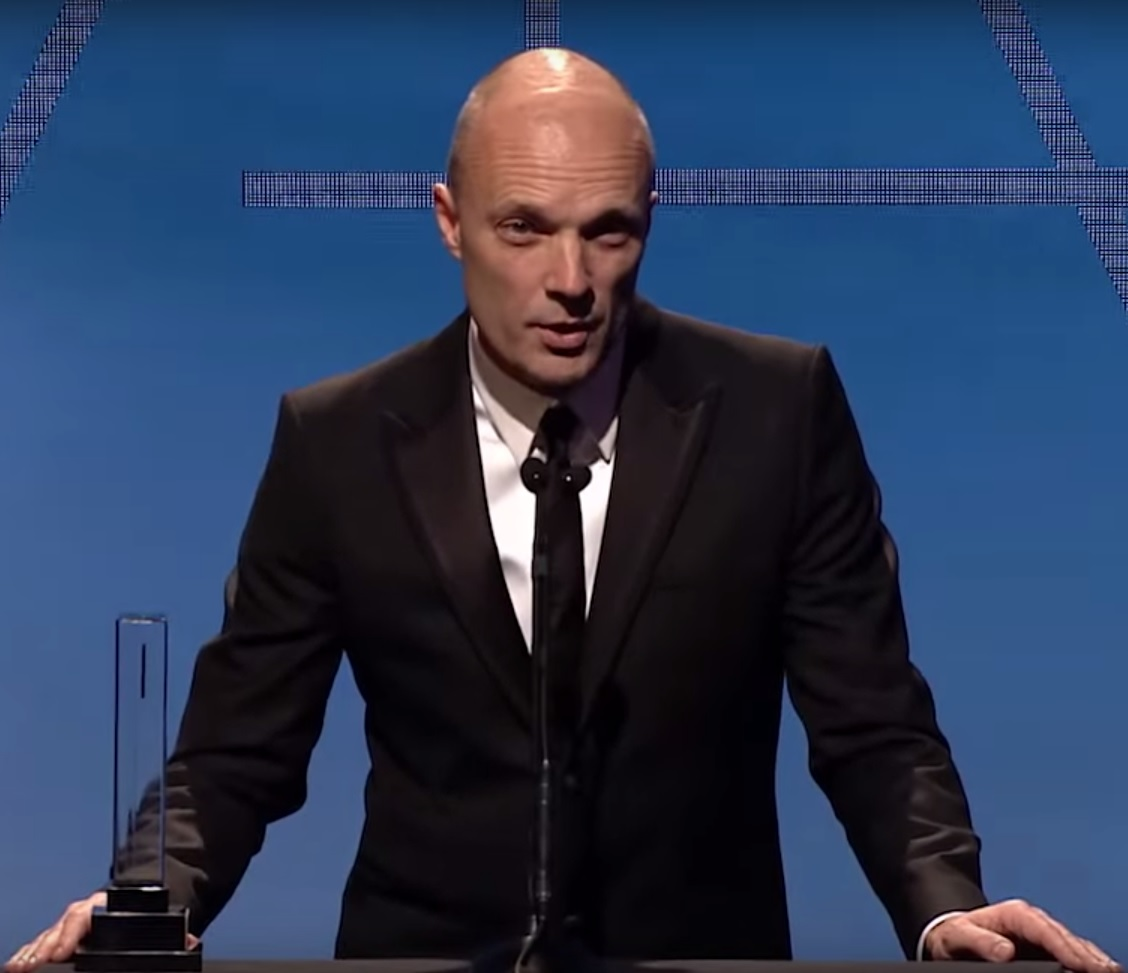
- Nicholson receiving 2014 Art Directors Guild award for Gravity
- Occupation: Production designer
- Years active: 1993-present

Andy Nicholson is an English production designer who has worked on various films, including Gravity, Divergent, Assassin's Creed, and Jurassic World: Fallen Kingdom. Nicholson has also worked as an art director for numerous films, including several by director Tim Burton.

== Career ==
=== Art director ===
Nicholson has worked several times with director Tim Burton, starting in 1999 as an art director on Sleepy Hollow. Nicholson subsequently worked as an art director on Burton's Charlie and the Chocolate Factory (2005), and later collaborated with Burton as a supervising art director on Alice in Wonderland (2010) and as a visual development art director on Frankenweenie (2012). Other art direction credits include Tony Scott's Spy Game (2001), Neil Jordan's The Good Thief (2002), and Wolfgang Petersen's Troy (2004).

His credits as a supervising art director include Anthony Minghella's Breaking and Entering (2006), Nancy Meyers' The Holiday (2006), Guy Ritchie's RocknRolla (2008), and Joe Johnston's The Wolfman (2010).

Further art director credits include Paul Greengrass's The Bourne Ultimatum (2007), Chris Weitz's The Golden Compass (2007), and Johnston's Captain America: The First Avenger (2011).

=== Production designer ===
As a production designer, Nicholson worked with director Alfonso Cuarón on the 2013 film Gravity, as well as the 2013 film The Host, directed by Andrew Niccol. He also served as the production designer on the 2014 science fiction action film Divergent for director Neil Burger, and served in the same position on the 2016 film Assassin's Creed under the direction of Justin Kurzel. After working for director J. A. Bayona on the 2018 film Jurassic World: Fallen Kingdom, Nicholson began design work on the 2019 film Captain Marvel for directors Anna Boden and Ryan Fleck.

== Awards and nominations ==
Nicholson won an Art Directors Guild (ADG) Award for his work on Sleepy Hollow, and was nominated for another ADG Award for his work as an art director on Charlie and the Chocolate Factory. Nicholson won another ADG Award for his work on The Golden Compass, and received ADG Award nominations for The Bourne Ultimatum and Captain America: The First Avenger. For his work on Gravity, Nicholson was nominated for a BAFTA and an Academy Award for Best Production Design at the 86th Academy Awards.

== Filmography ==
Key
†	Denotes films that have not yet been released

Year	Title	Director	Notes
1999	Sleepy Hollow	Tim Burton	Art director
2002	The Good Thief	Neil Jordan	Art director
2004	Troy	Wolfgang Petersen	Art director
2005	Charlie and the Chocolate Factory	Tim Burton	Art director
2006	Breaking and Entering	Anthony Minghella	Art director
2007	The Bourne Ultimatum	Paul Greengrass	Art director
2007	The Golden Compass	Chris Weitz	Art director
2008	RocknRolla	Guy Ritchie	Art director
2010	The Wolfman	Joe Johnston	Art director
2011	Captain America: The First Avenger	Joe Johnston	Art director
2013	The Host	Andrew Niccol	Production designer
2013	Gravity	Alfonso Cuarón	Production designer
2014	Divergent	Neil Burger	Production designer
2016	Assassin's Creed	Justin Kurzel	Production designer
2018	Jurassic World: Fallen Kingdom	J. A. Bayona	Production designer
2019	Captain Marvel	Anna Boden; Ryan Fleck	Production designer
2021	Red Notice	Rawson Marshall Thurber	Production designer
2022	The School for Good and Evil	Paul Feig	Production designer
2024	Constellation	Michelle MacLaren, Oliver Hirschbiegel, Joseph Cedar	Production designer
2025	Alien: Earth	Noah Hawley, Dana Gonzales, Ugla Hauksdóttir	Production designer
TBA	Voltron †	Rawson Marshall Thurber	Production designer
