= Rosie Goodwin =

American set decorator

- Occupation: Set decorator
- Years active: 2006 – present

Rosie Goodwin is a set decorator. Goodwin was nominated for an Academy Award for Best Production Design for the 2013 film Gravity.
