= Mark Sanger =

British film editor (born 1974)

- Born: 13 January 1974 (age 52); London, England
- Occupation: Film editor

Mark Sanger (born 13 January 1974) is a British film editor.

== Honours ==
In 2014 he was elected as a member of the Academy of Motion Picture Arts and Sciences and also as a member of the American Cinema Editors.

In July 2018 he was awarded an Honorary Doctor of Arts degree from Solent University. In 2018, Sanger released his short directorial debut Reflection, which screened at film festivals such as the International Film Festival of Wales, where it was nominated for Best Short Film.

In 2021 he became a member of British Film Editors (BFE).

== Filmography ==
2027	Editor	Blood on Snow	Cary Joji Fukunaga
2025	Executive Producer	The Bad-Ass Librarians of Timbuktu	Otto Bell
2025	Editor	Snow White	Marc Webb
2024	Editor	Venom: The Last Dance	Kelly Marcel
2024	Editor	Masters of the Air	Cary Joji Fukunaga
2022	Editor	Jurassic World Dominion	Colin Trevorrow
2020	Editor / Co-Producer	Joe Bell	Reinaldo Marcus Green
2020	Editor / Co-Producer	Embattled	Nick Sarkisov
2018	Director	Reflection	Mark Sanger
2019	Editor	Detective Pikachu	Rob Letterman
2018	Editor	Mowgli: Legend of the Jungle	Andy Serkis
2017	Editor	Transformers: The Last Knight	Michael Bay
2015	Editor	Last Knights	Kazuaki Kiriya
2013	Editor	Gravity	Alfonso Cuarón
2010	Visual Effects Editor	Alice in Wonderland	Tim Burton
2009	First Assistant Editor / Visual Effects Editor	Solomon Kane	M. J. Bassett
2008	First Assistant Editor / Visual Effects Editor	The Secret of Moonacre	Gábor Csupó
2007	Visual Effects Editor	Sweeney Todd: The Demon Barber of Fleet Street	Tim Burton
2006	Visual Effects Editor	Children of Men	Alfonso Cuarón
2006	First Assistant Editor / Visual Effects Editor	Alex Rider: Operation Stormbreaker	Geoffrey Sax
2005	Visual Effects Editor	Charlie and the Chocolate Factory	Tim Burton
2004	Visual Effects Editor	Troy	Wolfgang Petersen
2004	First Assistant Editor	If Only	Gil Junger
2002	Visual Effects Editor	Die Another Day	Lee Tamahori
2002	First Assistant Editor	Possession	Neil LaBute
2001	Assistant Editor	The Mummy Returns	Stephen Sommers
2000	Assistant Editor	102 Dalmatians	Kevin Lima
1999	Assistant Film Editor	Felicia's Journey	Atom Egoyan
1999	Assistant Film Editor	The Mummy	Stephen Sommers
1999	Assistant Film Editor	The World Is Not Enough	Michael Apted
1998	Assistant Film Editor	Respect	Oz Hutchins
1998	Location Assistant (Uncredited)	Goodnight Mister Tom	Jack Gold
1998	Location Assistant (Uncredited)	Shakespeare in Love	John Madden
1997	Assistant Film Editor	Tomorrow Never Dies	Roger Spottiswoode
1997	Floor Runner	Plotlands	John Strickland
1997	Location Assistant (Uncredited)	Hamish Macbeth	Mandie Fletcher
1994	Special Effects Technician (Uncredited)	Scarlett	John Erman

== Awards and nominations ==
=== 2024 ===
- Craft & Design Awards for Editing - Scripted - Masters of the Air (won)

=== 2014 ===
- Academy Award for Best Film Editing – Gravity (won)
- American Cinema Editors Award for Best Edited Feature Film – Dramatic – Gravity (nominated)
- BAFTA Award for Best Editing – Gravity (nominated)
- Saturn Award for Best Editing – Gravity (won)

=== 2013 ===
- Alliance of Women Film Journalists for Best Editing – Gravity (won)
- Chicago Film Critics Association Award for Best Editing – Gravity (won)
- Critics' Choice Movie Award for Best Editing – Gravity (won)
- Las Vegas Film Critics Society for Best Editing – Gravity (won)
- Los Angeles Film Critics Association for Best Editing – Gravity (won)
- Online Film Critics Society Award for Best Editing – Gravity (won)
- Phoenix Film Critics Society for Best Editing – Gravity (won)
- San Diego Film Critics Society for Best Editing – Gravity (nominated)
- San Francisco Film Critics Circle for Best Editing – Gravity (won)
- Satellite Award for Best Editing – Gravity (nominated)
- Washington D.C. Area Film Critics Association for Best Editing – Gravity (won)
