= List of accolades received by Saving Mr. Banks =

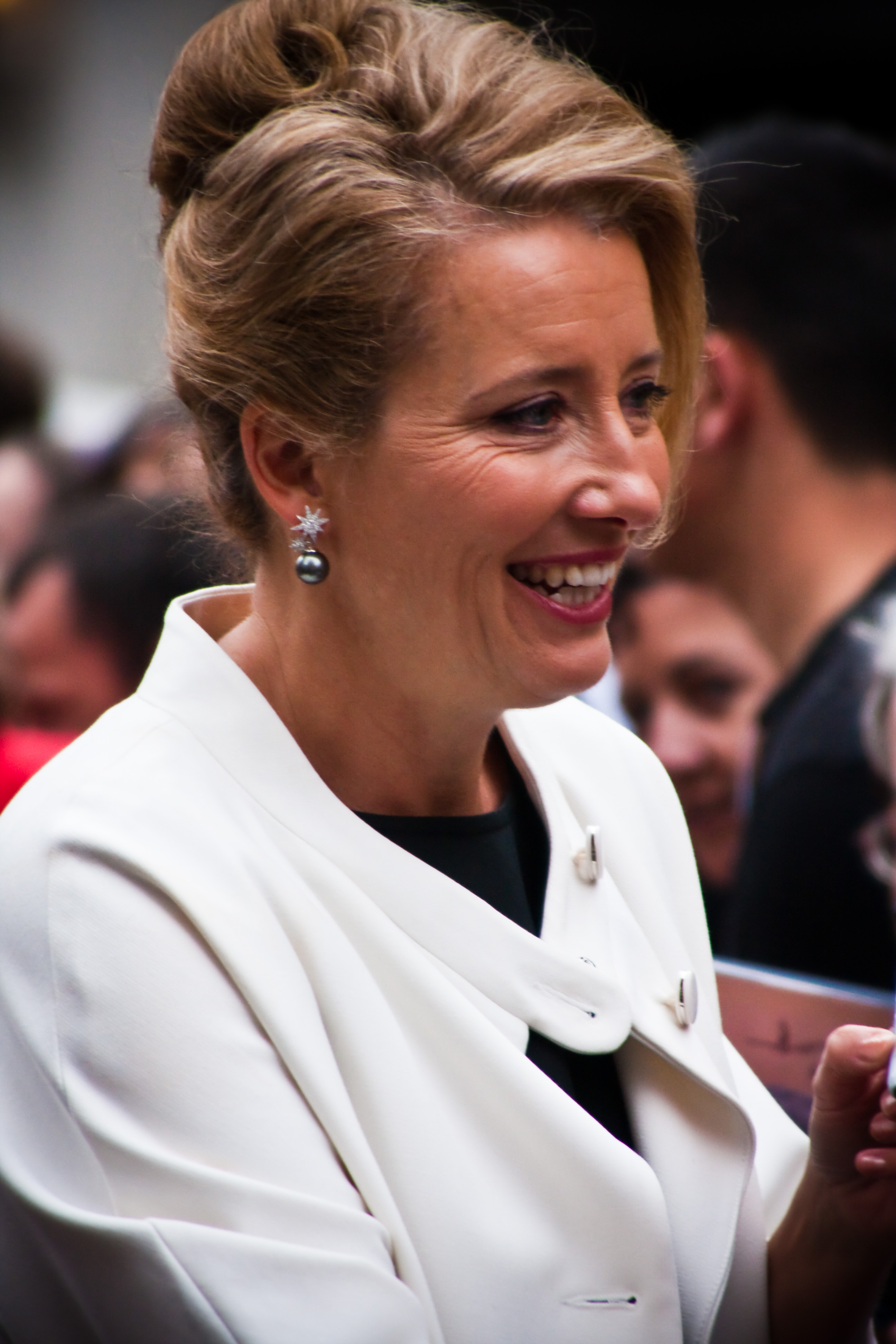
- Emma Thompson received wide acclaim for her performance as P.L Travers.
Accolades
Award	Won	Nominated	Standing
Academy Awards	0	1
AACTA International Awards	0	1
ACE Eddie Awards	0	1
African-American Film Critics Association Awards	0	1	8th place
Alliance of Women Film Journalists	0	1
American Film Institute Awards	1	1
Art Directors Guild Awards	0	1
ASC Award	1	1
BAFTA Awards	0	5
Costume Designers Guild	0	1
Critics' Choice Movie Awards	0	4
Denver Film Critics Society Awards	0	1
Grammy Awards	0	1
Golden Globe Awards	0	1
Gotham Independent Film Awards	2	2
Houston Film Critics Society Awards	0	3
Independent Spirit Awards	3	6
Las Vegas Film Critics Society	3	3
London Film Critics Circle Awards	1	2
Location Managers Guild of America	0	1
National Board of Review of Motion Pictures Awards	2	2
Palm Springs International Film Festival	1	1
Phoenix Film Critics Society Awards	0	9
Producers Guild of America Awards	0	1
Satellite Awards	0	6
San Diego Film Critics Society	0	2
St. Louis Gateway Film Critics Association	0	3
Saturn Awards	0	1
Society of Camera Operators	0	1
Screen Actors Guild Awards	0	1
UK Regional Critics' Film Awards	1	1
Washington D.C. Area Film Critics Association Awards	0	2
Women in Film and TV Awards	1	1
- Total number of awards and nominations (Note: Certain award groups do not simply award one winner. They recognize several different recipients and have runners-up. Since this is a specific recognition and is different from losing an award, runner-up mentions are considered wins in this award tally.)
Totals	17	69		
- References

Saving Mr. Banks is a 2013 biographical drama film directed by John Lee Hancock, produced by Walt Disney Pictures, and starring Emma Thompson as P.L. Travers and Tom Hanks as Walt Disney. The following is list of accolades received by the film.

== Accolades ==
List of awards and nominations
Award	Date of ceremony	Category	Recipients	Result
AARP Annual Movies for Grownups Awards	January 6, 2014	Best Movie for Grownups Who Refuse to Grow Up	Saving Mr. Banks	Won
Academy Awards	March 2, 2014	Best Original Score	Thomas Newman	Nominated
African-American Film Critics Association	December 13, 2013	Best Film of the Year		8th Place
Alliance of Women Film Journalists	December 19, 2013	Best Actress	Emma Thompson	Nominated
American Cinema Editors	February 7, 2014	Best Edited Feature Film - Dramatic	Mark Livolsi	Nominated
American Film Institute	January 10, 2014	Top Ten Films of the Year	Alison Owen, Ian Collie, and Philip Steuer	Won
Art Directors Guild	February 8, 2014	Excellence in Production Design - Period Film	Michael Corenblith	Nominated
Australian Academy of Cinema and Television Arts Awards	January 10, 2014	Best Screenplay – International	Kelly Marcel and Sue Smith	Nominated
British Academy Film Awards	February 16, 2014	Outstanding British Film	Alison Owen, Ian Collie, and Philip Steuer	Nominated
British Academy Film Awards	February 16, 2014	Best Actress in a Leading Role	Emma Thompson	Nominated
British Academy Film Awards	February 16, 2014	Outstanding Debut by a British Writer, Director or Producer	Kelly Marcel	Nominated
British Academy Film Awards	February 16, 2014	Best Film Music	Thomas Newman	Nominated
British Academy Film Awards	February 16, 2014	Best Costume Design	Daniel Orlandi	Nominated
Broadcast Film Critics Association	January 16, 2014	Best Picture		Nominated
Broadcast Film Critics Association	January 16, 2014	Best Actress	Emma Thompson	Nominated
Broadcast Film Critics Association	January 16, 2014	Best Score	Thomas Newman	Nominated
Broadcast Film Critics Association	January 16, 2014	Best Costume Design	Daniel Orlandi	Nominated
Costume Designers Guild	February 22, 2014	Excellence in Period Film	Daniel Orlandi	Nominated
Denver Film Critics Society	January 13, 2014	Best Actress	Emma Thompson	Nominated
Empire Awards	March 30, 2014	Best Actress	Emma Thompson	Won
Golden Globe Awards	January 12, 2014	Best Performance by an Actress in a Motion Picture – Drama	Emma Thompson	Nominated
Grammy Awards	February 8, 2015	Best Score Soundtrack for Visual Media	Thomas Newman	Nominated
Houston Film Critics Society	December 15, 2013	Best Picture		Nominated
Houston Film Critics Society	December 15, 2013	Best Actress	Emma Thompson	Nominated
Houston Film Critics Society	December 15, 2013	Best Original Score	Thomas Newman	Nominated
Las Vegas Film Critics Society	December 18, 2013	Top Ten Films		7th Place
Las Vegas Film Critics Society	December 18, 2013	Best Actress	Emma Thompson	Won
Las Vegas Film Critics Society	December 18, 2013	Best Family Film		Won
Location Managers Guild of America	March 29, 2014	Outstanding Achievement by a Location Professional – Feature Film	Andrew Ullman and Lori Balton	Nominated
London Film Critics Circle	February 2, 2014	Supporting Actor of the Year	Tom Hanks	Nominated
London Film Critics Circle	February 2, 2014	British Actress of the Year	Emma Thompson (also for Beautiful Creatures)	Nominated
National Board of Review	December 4, 2013	Best Actress	Emma Thompson	Won
National Board of Review	December 4, 2013	Top Ten Films	Saving Mr. Banks	Won
Palm Springs International Film Festival	January 5, 2014	Creative Impact in Directing Award	John Lee Hancock	Won
Phoenix Film Critics Society	December 17, 2013	Best Film		Nominated
Phoenix Film Critics Society	December 17, 2013	Best Director	John Lee Hancock	Nominated
Phoenix Film Critics Society	December 17, 2013	Best Actress in a Leading Role	Emma Thompson	Nominated
Phoenix Film Critics Society	December 17, 2013	Best Actor in a Supporting Role	Tom Hanks	Nominated
Phoenix Film Critics Society	December 17, 2013	Best Ensemble Acting		Nominated
Phoenix Film Critics Society	December 17, 2013	Best Original Score	Thomas Newman	Nominated
Phoenix Film Critics Society	December 17, 2013	Best Production Design	Lauren E. Polizzi, Michael Corenblith	Nominated
Phoenix Film Critics Society	December 17, 2013	Best Costume Design	Daniel Orlandi	Nominated
Phoenix Film Critics Society	December 17, 2013	Best Performance by a Youth in a Lead or Supporting Role – Female	Annie Rose Buckley	Nominated
Producers Guild of America Award	January 19, 2014	Best Theatrical Motion Picture	Ian Collie, Alison Owen, Philip Steuer	Nominated
San Diego Film Critics Society	December 11, 2013	Best Actress	Emma Thompson	Nominated
San Diego Film Critics Society	December 11, 2013	Best Production Design	Michael Corenblith	Nominated
Satellite Awards	February 23, 2014	Best Motion Picture		Nominated
Satellite Awards	February 23, 2014	Best Actress – Motion Picture	Emma Thompson	Nominated
Satellite Awards	February 23, 2014	Best Supporting Actor – Motion Picture	Tom Hanks	Nominated
Satellite Awards	February 23, 2014	Best Original Screenplay	Kelly Marcel and Sue Smith	Nominated
Satellite Awards	February 23, 2014	Best Art Direction and Production Design	Lauren E. Polizzi and Michael Corenblith	Nominated
Satellite Awards	February 23, 2014	Best Costume Design	Daniel Orlandi	Nominated
Saturn Awards	June 18, 2014	Best Actress	Emma Thompson	Nominated
Society of Camera Operators	March 8, 2014	Camera Operator of the Year Award	Ian Fox	Nominated
Screen Actors Guild Awards	January 18, 2014	Outstanding Performance by a Female Actor in a Leading Role	Emma Thompson	Nominated
St. Louis Gateway Film Critics Association	December 16, 2013	Best Actress	Emma Thompson	Nominated
St. Louis Gateway Film Critics Association	December 16, 2013	Best Original Screenplay	Kelly Marcel and Sue Smith	Nominated
St. Louis Gateway Film Critics Association	December 16, 2013	Best Musical Score	Thomas Newman	Nominated
UK Regional Critics' Film Awards	January 29, 2014	Best On-Screen Duo	Emma Thompson and Tom Hanks	Won
Washington D.C. Area Film Critics Association	December 9, 2013	Best Actress	Emma Thompson	Nominated
Washington D.C. Area Film Critics Association	December 9, 2013	Best Score	Thomas Newman	Nominated
Women in Film and TV Awards	December 5, 2013	FremantleMedia U.K. New Talent Award	Kelly Marcel (screenwriter of Saving Mr. Banks and Fifty Shades of Grey)	Won
