= 71st Golden Globe Awards =

Film award ceremony in 2014

- Official poster
- Date: January 12, 2014
- Site: The Beverly Hilton, Beverly Hills, California, U.S.
- Hosted by: Tina Fey; Amy Poehler

Highlights
- Best Film: Drama: 12 Years a Slave
- Best Film: Musical or Comedy: American Hustle
- Best Drama Series: Breaking Bad
- Best Musical or Comedy Series: Brooklyn Nine-Nine
- Best Miniseries or Television movie: Behind the Candelabra
- Most awards: American Hustle (3)
- Most nominations: 12 Years a Slave; American Hustle (7)

Television coverage
- Network: NBC

The 71st Golden Globe Awards, honoring the best in film and American television of 2013, was broadcast live from the Beverly Hilton Hotel in Beverly Hills, California, on January 12, 2014, by NBC, as part of the 2013–14 film awards season. The ceremony was produced by Dick Clark Productions in association with the Hollywood Foreign Press Association. Woody Allen was announced as the Cecil B. DeMille Award honoree for his lifetime achievements on September 13, 2013, and Diane Keaton accepted the award for him. On October 15, Tina Fey and Amy Poehler were announced as the co-hosts for the second time in a row and as the co-hosts for the 72nd Golden Globe Awards. The nominations were announced on December 12, 2013, by Aziz Ansari, Zoe Saldaña and Olivia Wilde. American Hustle, Behind the Candelabra, Breaking Bad, Brooklyn Nine-Nine, and Dallas Buyers Club were among the films and television shows that received multiple awards.

== Winners and nominees ==
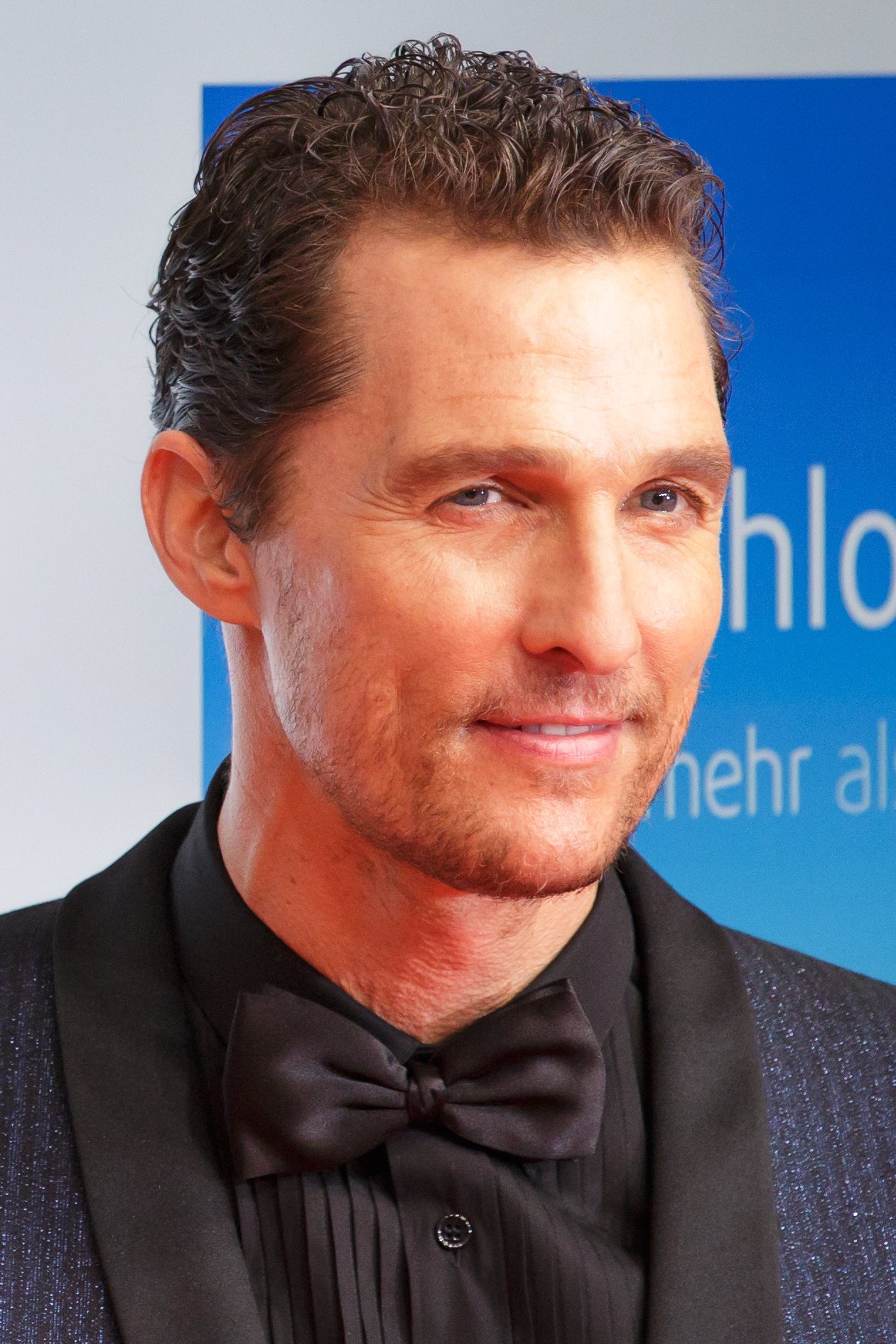
Matthew McConaughey, Best Actor in a Motion Picture – Drama winner

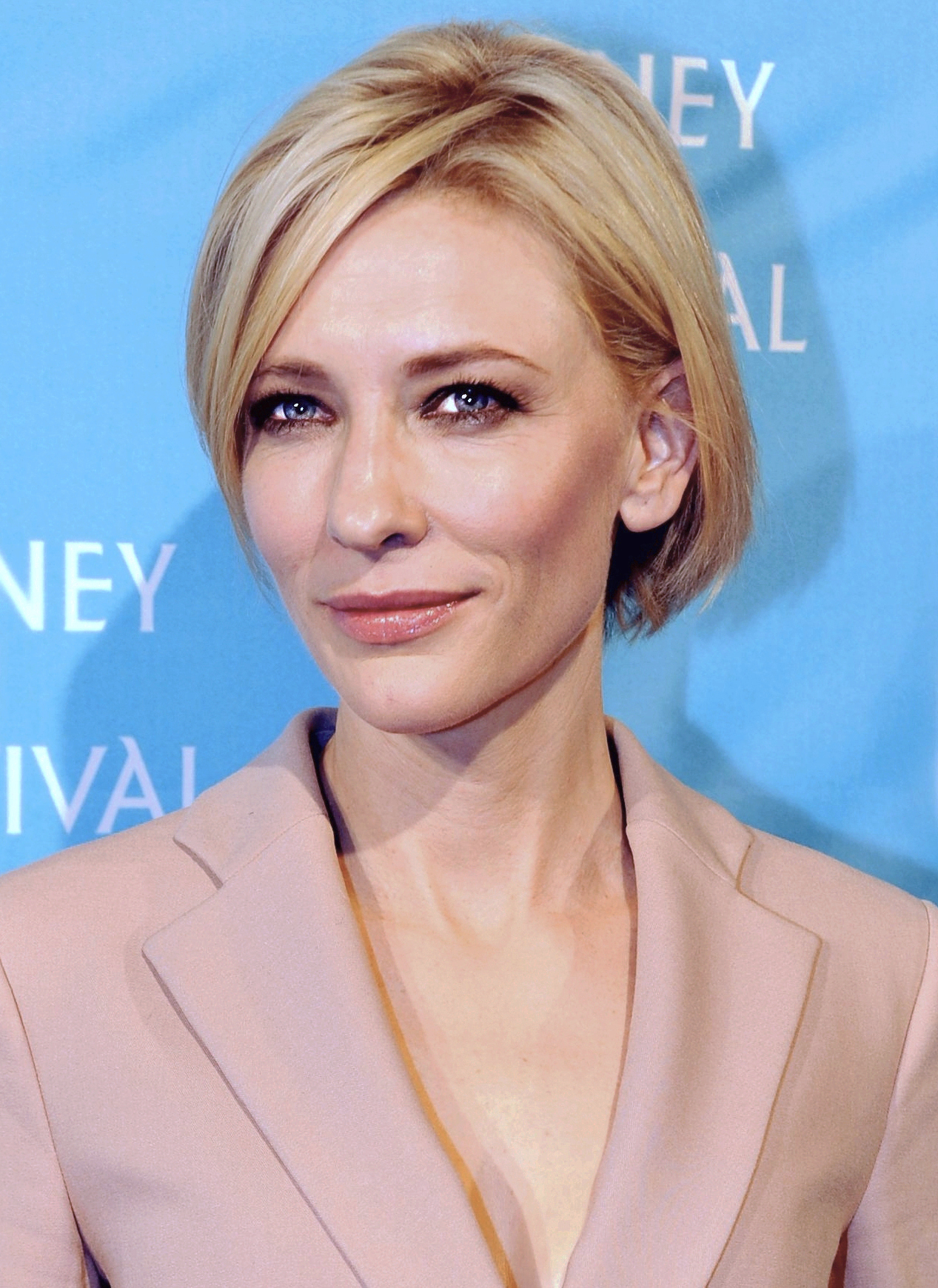
Cate Blanchett, Best Actress in a Motion Picture – Drama winner

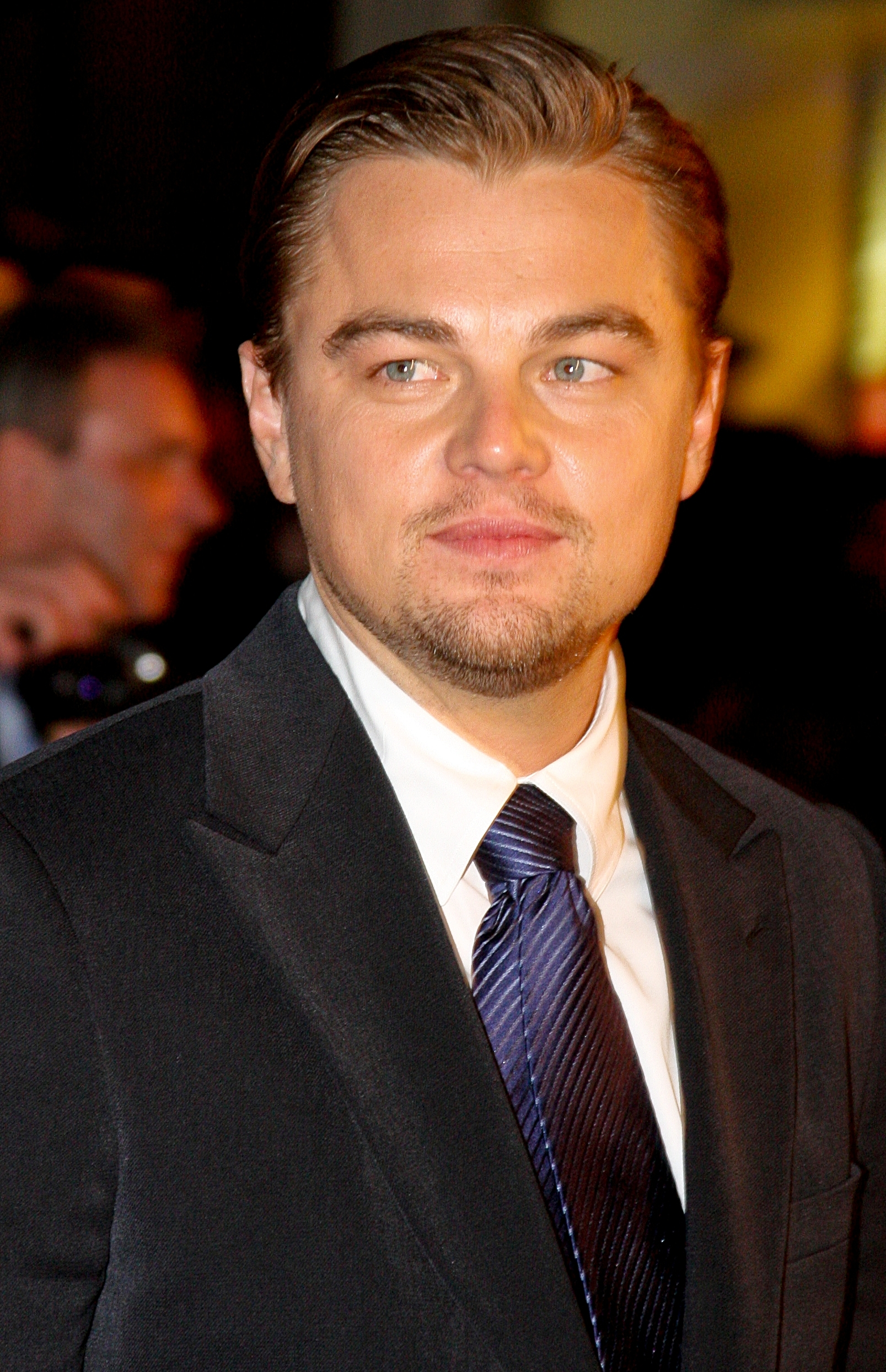
Leonardo DiCaprio, Best Actor in a Motion Picture – Musical or Comedy winner

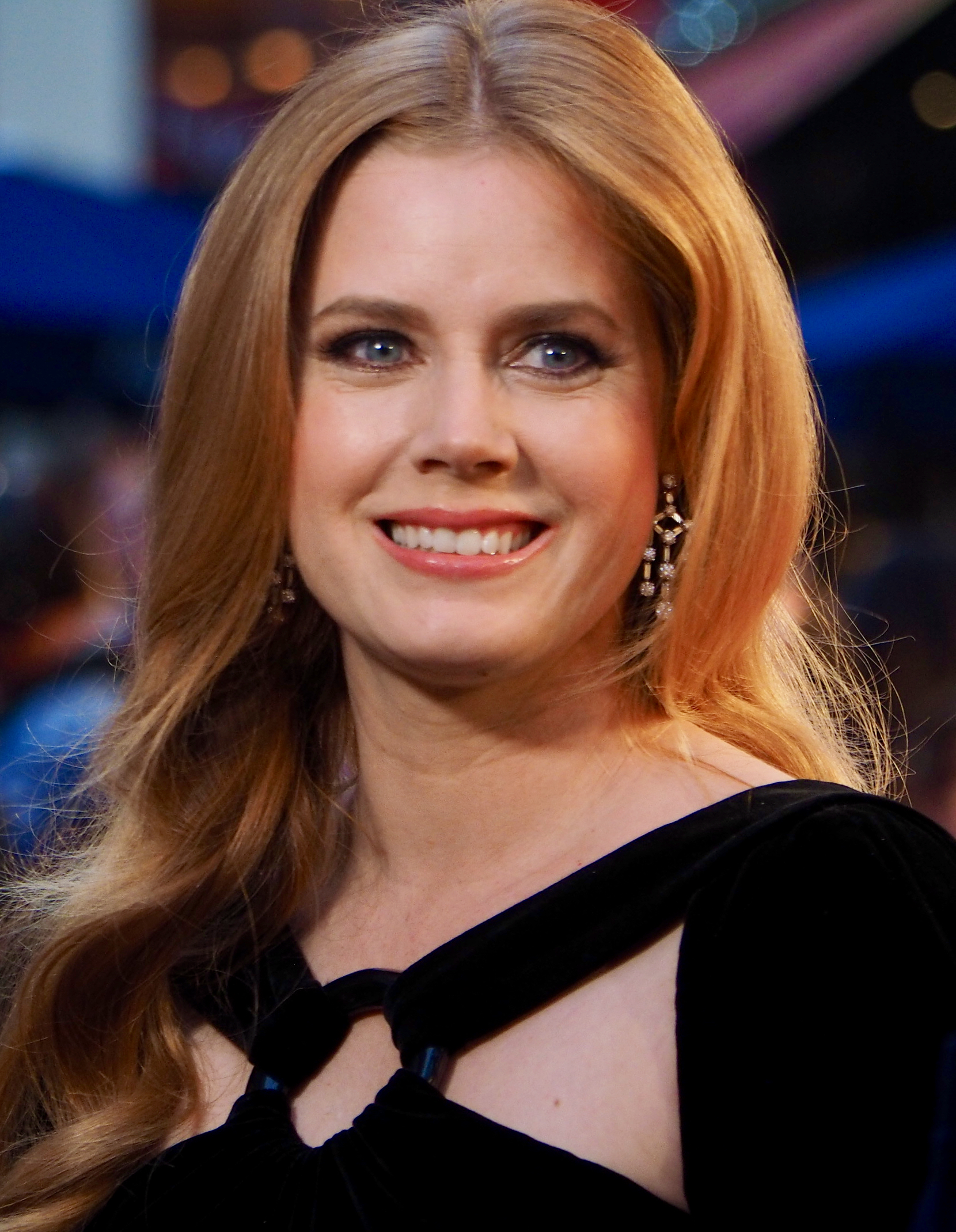
Amy Adams, Best Actress in a Motion Picture – Musical or Comedy winner

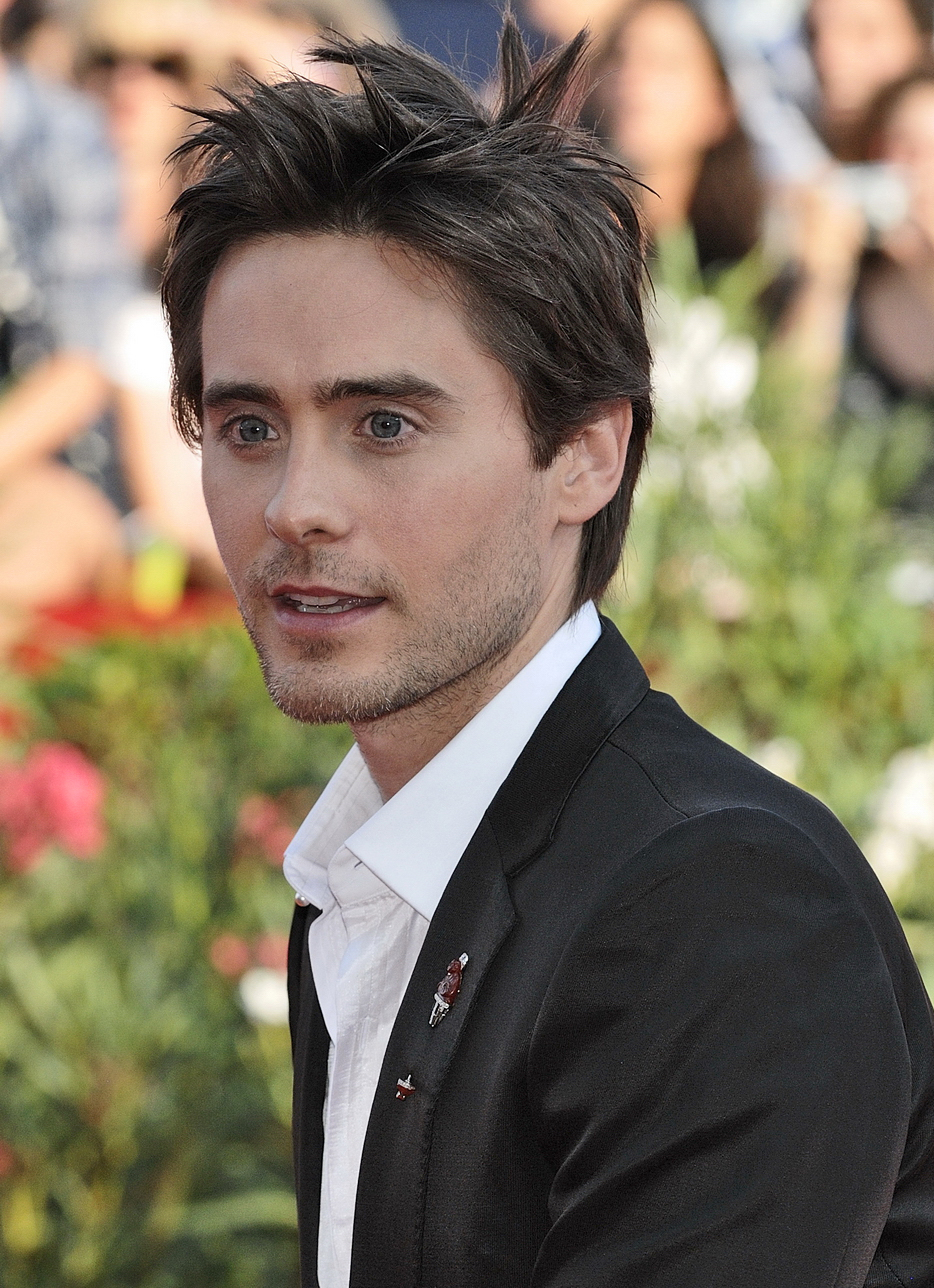
Jared Leto, Best Supporting Actor winner

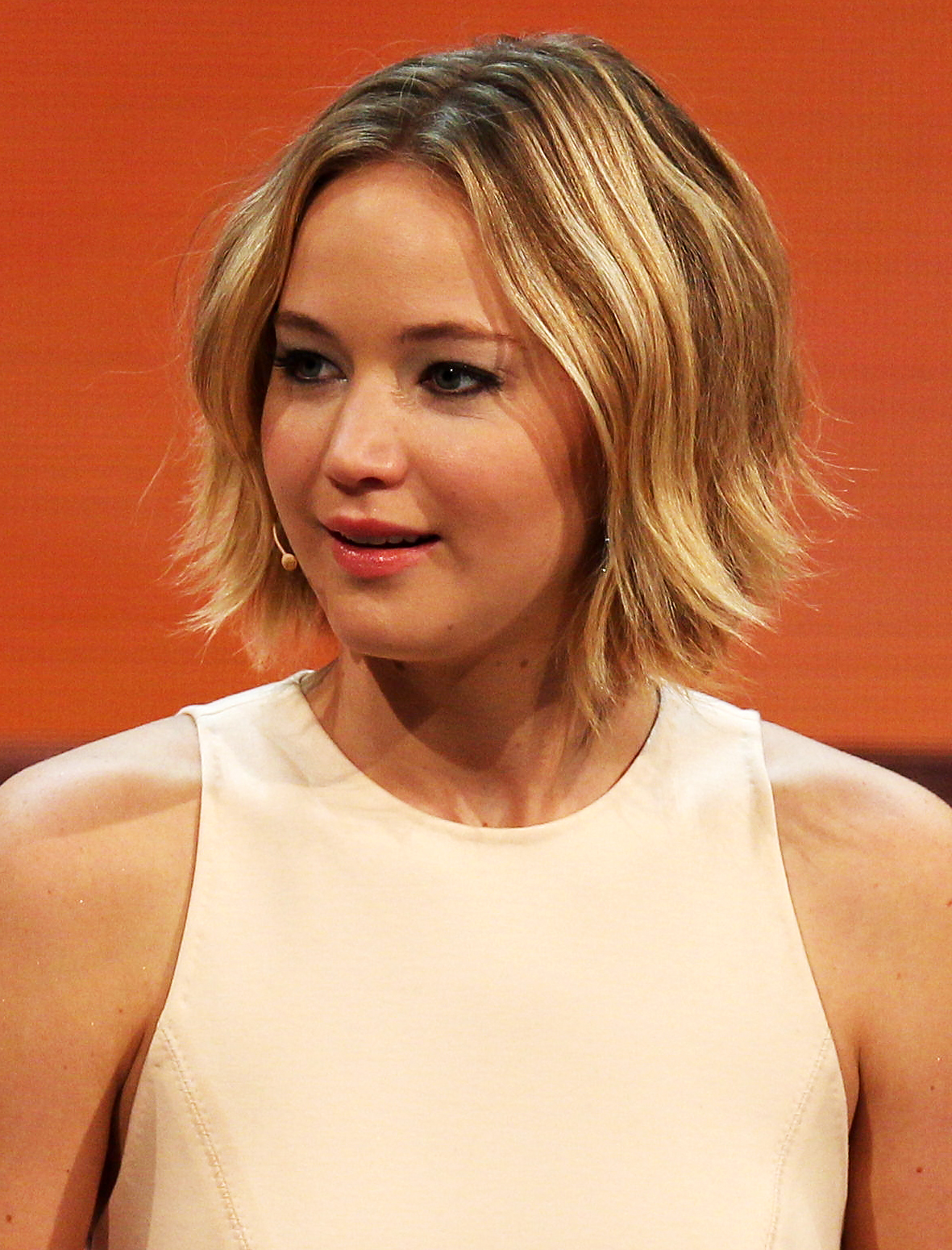
Jennifer Lawrence, Best Supporting Actress winner

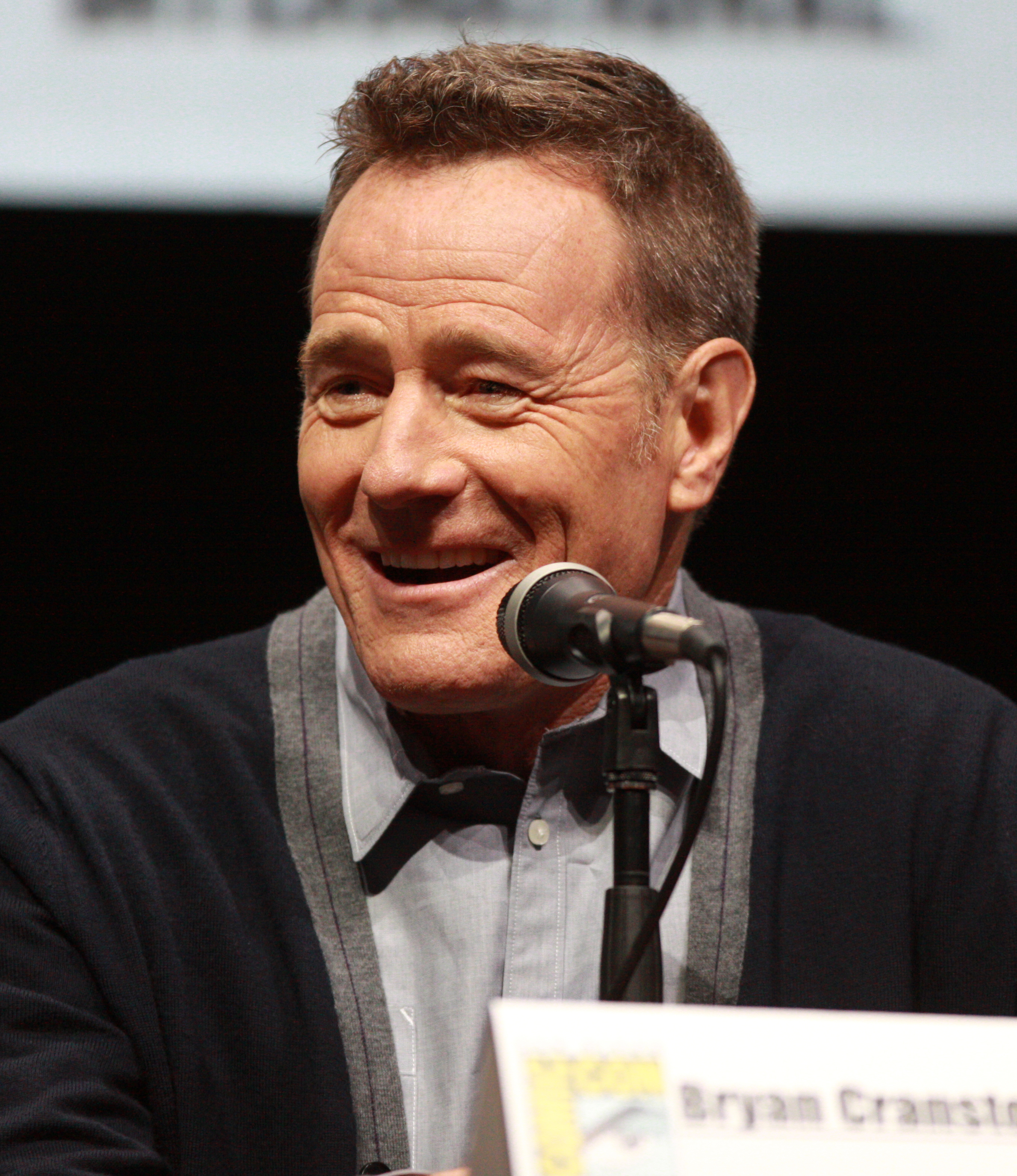
Bryan Cranston, Best Actor in a Television Series – Drama winner

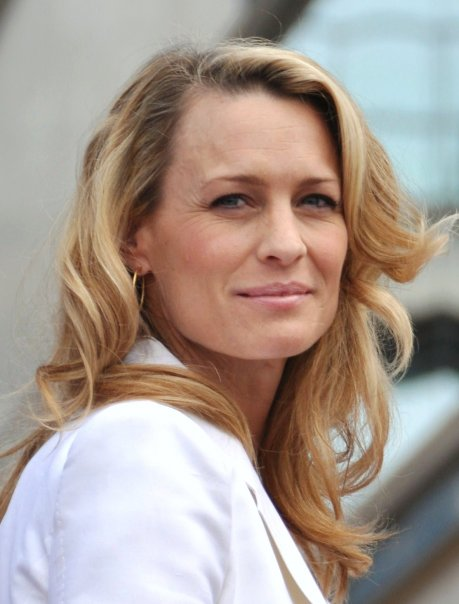
Robin Wright, Best Actress in a Television Series – Drama winner

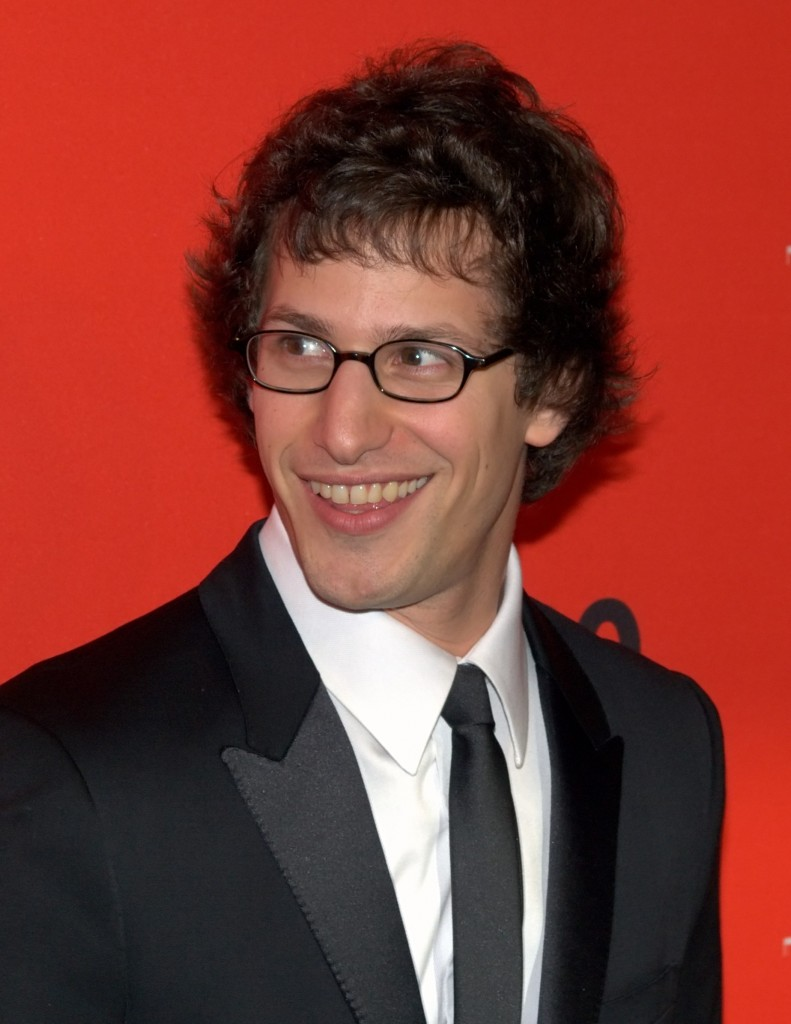
Andy Samberg, Best Actor in a Television Series – Comedy or Musical winner

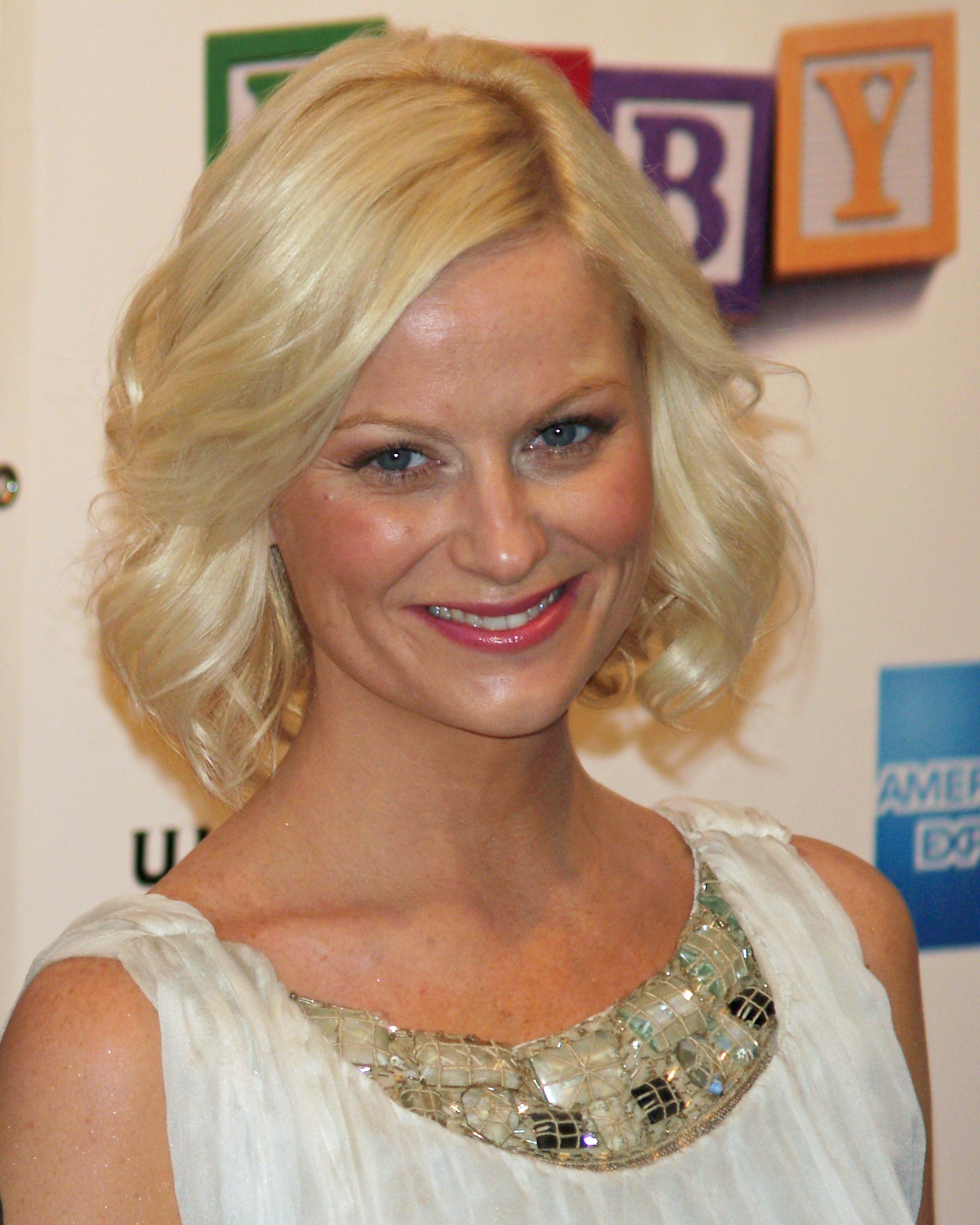
Amy Poehler, Best Actress in a Television Series – Comedy or Musical winner

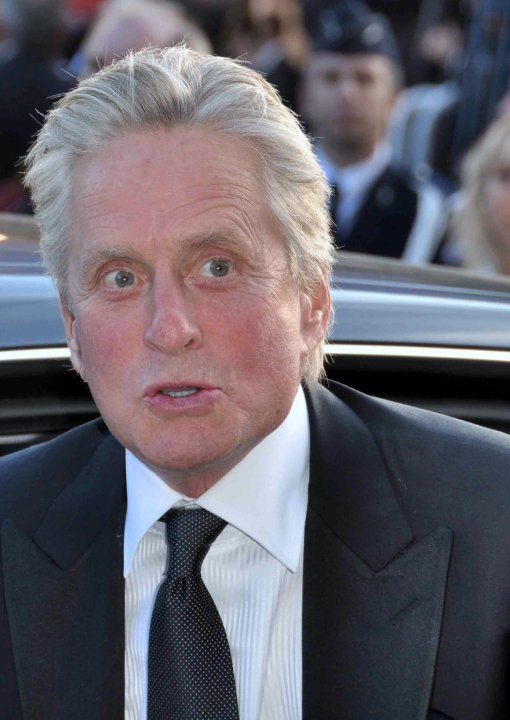
Michael Douglas, Best Actor in a Miniseries or Television Film winner

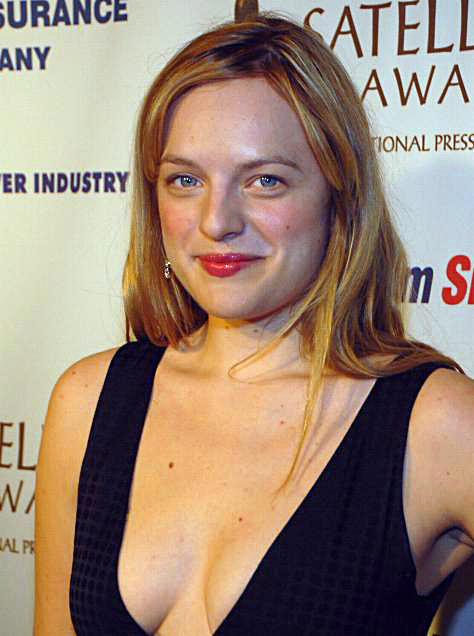
Elisabeth Moss, Best Actress in a Miniseries or Television Film winner

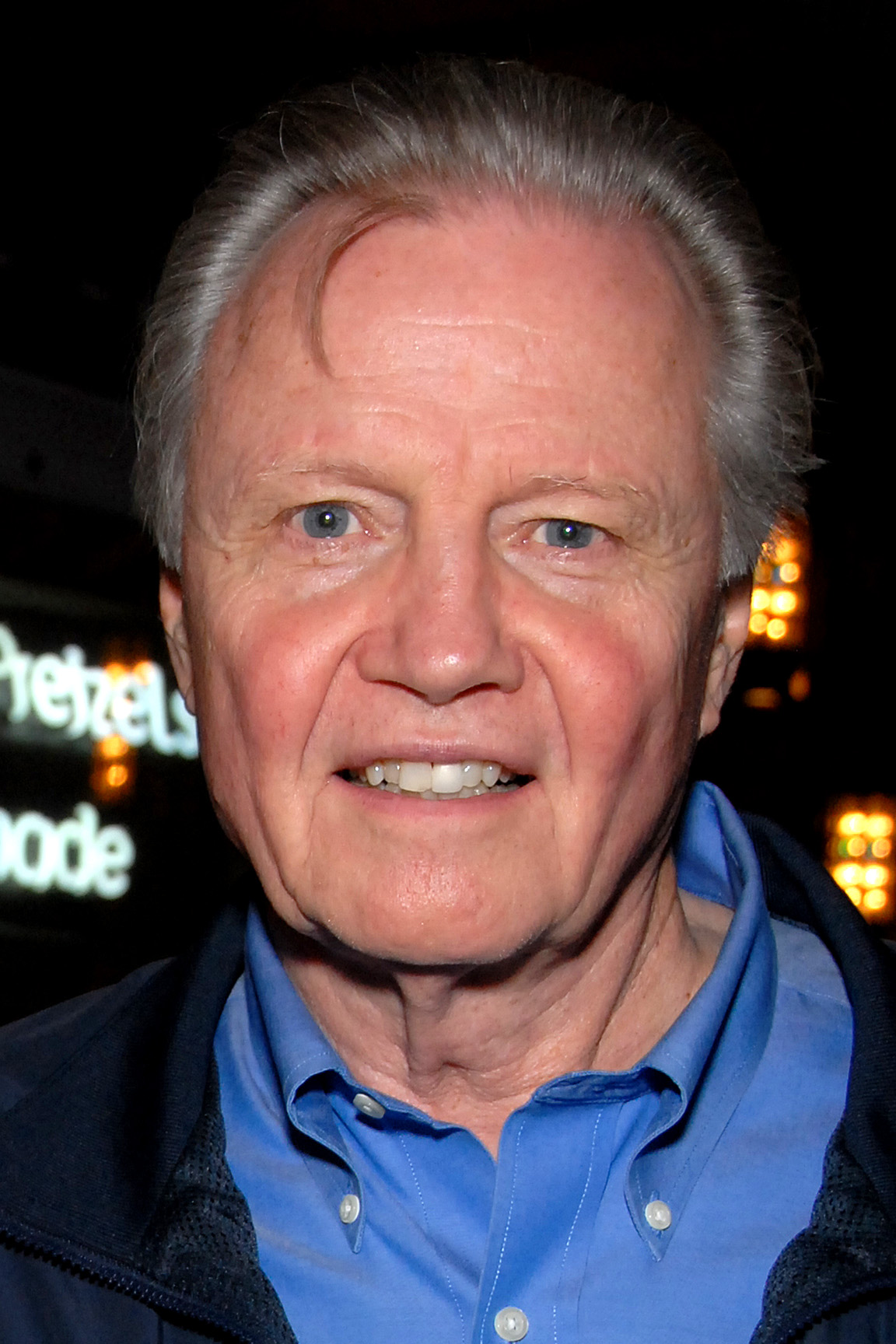
Jon Voight, Best Supporting Actor in a Series, Miniseries, or Television Film winner

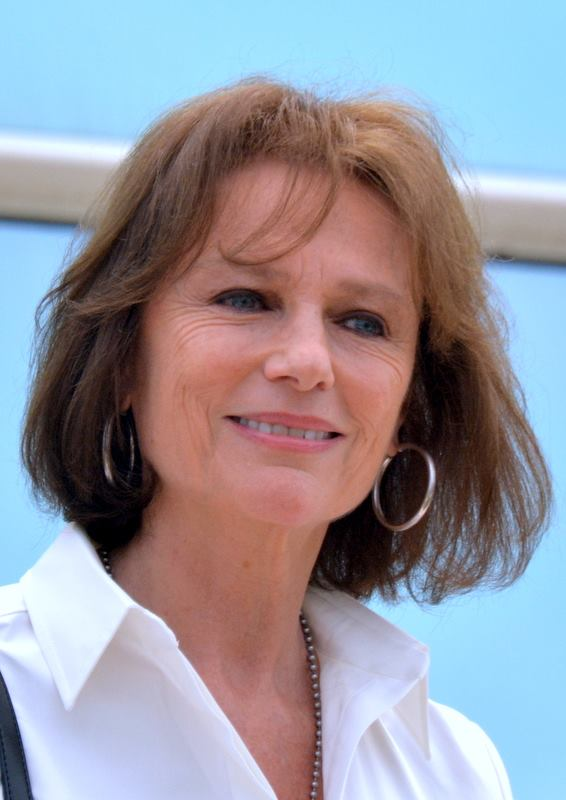
Jacqueline Bisset, Best Supporting Actress in a Series, Miniseries, or Television Film winner

These are the nominees for the 71st Golden Globe Awards. Winners are listed at the top of each list.

=== Film ===
Best Motion Picture
Drama	Musical or Comedy
12 Years a Slave; Captain Phillips; Gravity; Philomena; Rush	American Hustle; Her; Inside Llewyn Davis; Nebraska; The Wolf of Wall Street
Best Performance in a Motion Picture – Drama
Actor	Actress
Matthew McConaughey – Dallas Buyers Club as Ron Woodroof; Chiwetel Ejiofor – 12 Years a Slave as Solomon Northup; Idris Elba – Mandela: Long Walk to Freedom as Nelson Mandela; Tom Hanks – Captain Phillips as Captain Richard Phillips; Robert Redford – All Is Lost as Our Man	Cate Blanchett – Blue Jasmine as Jeanette "Jasmine" Francis; Sandra Bullock – Gravity as Dr. Ryan Stone; Judi Dench – Philomena as Philomena Lee; Emma Thompson – Saving Mr. Banks as P. L. Travers; Kate Winslet – Labor Day as Adele Wheeler
Best Performance in a Motion Picture – Musical or Comedy
Actor	Actress
Leonardo DiCaprio – The Wolf of Wall Street as Jordan Belfort; Christian Bale – American Hustle as Irving Rosenfeld; Bruce Dern – Nebraska as Woody Grant; Oscar Isaac – Inside Llewyn Davis as Llewyn Davis; Joaquin Phoenix – Her as Theodore Twombly	Amy Adams – American Hustle as Sydney Prosser; Julie Delpy – Before Midnight as Céline Wallace; Greta Gerwig – Frances Ha as Frances Halladay; Julia Louis-Dreyfus – Enough Said as Eva Henderson; Meryl Streep – August: Osage County as Violet Weston
Best Supporting Performance in a Motion Picture – Drama, Musical or Comedy
Supporting Actor	Supporting Actress
Jared Leto – Dallas Buyers Club as Rayon; Barkhad Abdi – Captain Phillips as Abduwali Muse; Daniel Brühl – Rush as Niki Lauda; Bradley Cooper – American Hustle as Richie DiMaso; Michael Fassbender – 12 Years a Slave as Edwin Epps	Jennifer Lawrence – American Hustle as Rosalyn Rosenfeld; Sally Hawkins – Blue Jasmine as Ginger; Lupita Nyong'o – 12 Years a Slave as Patsey; Julia Roberts – August: Osage County as Barbara Weston-Fordham; June Squibb – Nebraska as Kate Grant
Other
Best Director	Best Screenplay
Alfonso Cuarón – Gravity; Paul Greengrass – Captain Phillips; Steve McQueen – 12 Years a Slave; Alexander Payne – Nebraska; David O. Russell – American Hustle	Spike Jonze – Her; Steve Coogan and Jeff Pope – Philomena; Bob Nelson – Nebraska; John Ridley – 12 Years a Slave; Eric Warren Singer and David O. Russell – American Hustle
Best Original Score	Best Original Song
Alex Ebert – All Is Lost; Alex Heffes – Mandela: Long Walk to Freedom; Steven Price – Gravity; John Williams – The Book Thief; Hans Zimmer – 12 Years a Slave	"Ordinary Love" (U2 and Danger Mouse) – Mandela: Long Walk to Freedom; "Atlas" (Coldplay) – The Hunger Games: Catching Fire; "Let It Go" (Kristen Anderson-Lopez and Robert Lopez) – Frozen; "Please Mr. Kennedy" (Ed Rush, George Cromarty (posthumous nomination), T Bone Burnett, Justin Timberlake, Joel Coen and Ethan Coen) – Inside Llewyn Davis; "Sweeter than Fiction" (Taylor Swift and Jack Antonoff) – One Chance
Best Animated Feature Film	Best Foreign Language Film
Frozen; The Croods; Despicable Me 2	The Great Beauty (Italy); Blue Is the Warmest Colour (France); The Hunt (Denmark); The Past (Iran); The Wind Rises (Japan)

=== Films with multiple nominations ===
The following 16 films received multiple nominations:

Nominations	Film
7	12 Years a Slave
7	American Hustle
5	Nebraska
4	Captain Phillips
4	Gravity
3	Her
3	Inside Llewyn Davis
3	Mandela: Long Walk to Freedom
3	Philomena
2	All Is Lost
2	August: Osage County
2	Blue Jasmine
2	Dallas Buyers Club
2	Frozen
2	Rush
2	The Wolf of Wall Street

=== Films with multiple wins ===
The following 2 films received multiple wins:

Wins	Films
3	American Hustle
2	Dallas Buyers Club

=== Television ===
Best Series
Drama	Musical or Comedy
Breaking Bad (AMC); Downton Abbey (PBS); The Good Wife (CBS); House of Cards (Netflix); Masters of Sex (Showtime)	Brooklyn Nine-Nine (Fox); The Big Bang Theory (CBS); Girls (HBO); Modern Family (ABC); Parks and Recreation (NBC)
Best Performance in a Television Series – Drama
Actor	Actress
Bryan Cranston – Breaking Bad (AMC) as Walter White; Liev Schreiber – Ray Donovan (Showtime) as Ray Donovan; Michael Sheen – Masters of Sex (Showtime) as Bill Masters; Kevin Spacey – House of Cards (Netflix) as Frank Underwood; James Spader – The Blacklist (NBC) as Raymond Reddington	Robin Wright – House of Cards (Netflix) as Claire Underwood; Julianna Margulies – The Good Wife (CBS) as Alicia Florrick; Tatiana Maslany – Orphan Black (BBC America) as various characters; Taylor Schilling – Orange Is the New Black (Netflix) as Piper Chapman; Kerry Washington – Scandal (ABC) as Olivia Pope
Best Performance in a Television Series – Musical or Comedy
Actor	Actress
Andy Samberg – Brooklyn Nine-Nine (Fox) as Jake Peralta; Jason Bateman – Arrested Development (Netflix) as Michael Bluth; Don Cheadle – House of Lies (Showtime) as Marty Kaan; Michael J. Fox – The Michael J. Fox Show (NBC) as Mike Henry; Jim Parsons – The Big Bang Theory (CBS) as Sheldon Cooper	Amy Poehler – Parks and Recreation (NBC) as Leslie Knope; Zooey Deschanel – New Girl (Fox) as Jessica "Jess" Day; Lena Dunham – Girls (HBO) as Hannah Horvath; Edie Falco – Nurse Jackie (Showtime) as Jackie Peyton; Julia Louis-Dreyfus – Veep (HBO) as Vice President Selina Meyer
Best Performance in a Miniseries or Television Film
Actor	Actress
Michael Douglas – Behind the Candelabra (HBO) as Liberace; Matt Damon – Behind the Candelabra (HBO) as Scott Thorson; Chiwetel Ejiofor – Dancing on the Edge (Starz) as Louis Lester; Idris Elba – Luther (BBC America) as John Luther; Al Pacino – Phil Spector (HBO) as Phil Spector	Elisabeth Moss – Top of the Lake (Sundance TV) as Det. Robin Griffin; Helena Bonham Carter – Burton & Taylor (BBC America) as Elizabeth Taylor; Rebecca Ferguson – The White Queen (Starz) as Elizabeth Woodville; Jessica Lange – American Horror Story: Coven (FX) as Fiona Goode; Helen Mirren – Phil Spector (HBO) as Linda Kenney Baden
Best Supporting Performance in a Series, Miniseries, or Television Film
Supporting Actor	Supporting Actress
Jon Voight – Ray Donovan (Showtime) as Mickey Donovan; Josh Charles – The Good Wife (CBS) as Will Gardner; Rob Lowe – Behind the Candelabra (HBO) as Dr. Jack Startz; Aaron Paul – Breaking Bad (AMC) as Jesse Pinkman; Corey Stoll – House of Cards (Netflix) as Peter Russo	Jacqueline Bisset – Dancing on the Edge (Starz) as Lady Livinia Cremone; Janet McTeer – The White Queen (Starz) as Jacquetta of Luxembourg; Hayden Panettiere – Nashville (ABC) as Juliette Barnes; Monica Potter – Parenthood (NBC) as Kristina Braverman; Sofía Vergara – Modern Family (ABC) as Gloria Delgado-Pritchett
Best Miniseries or Television Film
Behind the Candelabra (HBO); American Horror Story: Coven (FX); Dancing on the Edge (Starz); Top of the Lake (Sundance TV); The White Queen (Starz)

=== Series with multiple nominations ===
The following 16 series received multiple nominations:

Nominations	Series
4	Behind the Candelabra
4	House of Cards
3	Breaking Bad
3	Dancing on the Edge
3	The Good Wife
3	The White Queen
2	American Horror Story: Coven
2	The Big Bang Theory
2	Brooklyn Nine-Nine
2	Girls
2	Masters of Sex
2	Modern Family
2	Parks and Recreation
2	Phil Spector
2	Ray Donovan
2	Top of the Lake

=== Series with multiple wins ===
The following 3 series won multiple times:

Wins	Series
2	Behind the Candelabra
2	Brooklyn Nine-Nine
2	Breaking Bad

== Presenters ==
The Hollywood Foreign Press Association announced the following presenters:

- Ben Affleck with Best Director – Motion Picture
- Kevin Bacon and Kyra Sedgwick with intro of Miss Golden Globe and Best Actress in a Television Series – Drama
- Drew Barrymore with Best Motion Picture – Musical or Comedy
- Kate Beckinsale, Sean Combs, and Usher with Best Original Score and Best Original Song
- Orlando Bloom and Zoe Saldaña with Best Foreign Language Film
- Julie Bowen and Seth Meyers with Best Actor in a Television Series – Comedy or Musical
- Sandra Bullock and Tom Hanks with Best Supporting Actress – Motion Picture
- Jim Carrey introduced American Hustle
- Jessica Chastain with Best Actor in a Motion Picture – Drama
- Emilia Clarke and Chris O'Donnell with Best Actress in a Television Series – Comedy or Musical
- Steve Coogan and Philomena Lee introduced Philomena
- Matt Damon introduced Captain Phillips
- Johnny Depp with Best Motion Picture – Drama
- Laura Dern introduced Nebraska
- Leonardo DiCaprio with Best Actress in a Motion Picture – Drama
- Robert Downey Jr. with Best Actress in a Motion Picture – Musical or Comedy
- Aaron Eckhart and Paula Patton with Best Actor in a Television Series – Drama and Best Television Series – Drama
- Chris Evans and Uma Thurman with Best Television Series – Comedy or Musical
- Jimmy Fallon and Melissa McCarthy with Best Actor – Miniseries or Television Film
- Colin Farrell introduced Inside Llewyn Davis
- Amber Heard, Taylor Kinney, and Jesse Spencer with Best Supporting Actor – Series, Miniseries or Television Film
- Chris Hemsworth and Niki Lauda introduced Rush
- Jonah Hill and Margot Robbie introduced The Wolf of Wall Street
- Mila Kunis and Channing Tatum with Best Supporting Actress – Series, Miniseries or Television Film
- Jennifer Lawrence with Best Actor in a Motion Picture – Musical or Comedy
- Liam Neeson introduced Gravity
- Chris Pine and Emma Watson with Best Animated Feature Film
- Mark Ruffalo and Naomi Watts with Best Miniseries or Television Film and Best Actress – Miniseries or Television Film
- Emma Stone with Cecil B. DeMille Award (accepted by Diane Keaton)
- Emma Thompson with Best Screenplay
- Christoph Waltz with Best Supporting Actor – Motion Picture
- Olivia Wilde introduced Her
- Reese Witherspoon introduced 12 Years a Slave

== In Memoriam ==
No "In Memoriam" section was broadcast on television during the ceremony. The HFPA included a slideshow on their website including the following names:

- Jean Stapleton
- Esther Williams
- James Gandolfini
- Eileen Brennan
- Karen Black
- Peter O'Toole
- Steve Forrest
- John Kerr
- Abigail Van Buren
- Annette Funicello
- Audrey Totter
- Bonnie Franklin
- Conrad Bain
- Cory Monteith
- Dale Robertson
- David Frost
- Deanna Durbin
- Dennis Farina
- Dr. Joyce Brothers
- Ed Lauter
- Eleanor Parker
- Elmore Leonard
- Gary David Goldberg
- George Jones
- Hal Needham
- Jeanne Cooper
- Jim Kelly
- Joan Fontaine
- Jonathan Winters
- Julie Harris
- Lisa Robin Kelly
- Lou Myers
- Lou Reed
- Marcia Wallace
- Michael Ansara
- Mindy McCready
- Patti Page
- Paul Walker
- Phil Ramone
- Ray Dolby
- Ray Harryhausen
- Ray Manzarek
- Ray Price
- Richard Griffiths
- Richie Havens
- Roger Ebert
- Tom Laughlin
- Tom Clancy
- Henry Bromell
- Arthur Wilde
- Fay Kanin
- Jane Henson
- Bigas Luna
- Rick Finkelstein
- Ruth Prawer Jhabvala
- Van Cliburn

== See also ==
- Hollywood Foreign Press Association
- 86th Academy Awards
- 66th Primetime Emmy Awards
- 65th Primetime Emmy Awards
- 20th Screen Actors Guild Awards
- 67th British Academy Film Awards
- 3rd AACTA International Awards
- 34th Golden Raspberry Awards
- 68th Tony Awards
- 2013 in film
- 2013 in American television
