= Thomas Puccio =

American lawyer

- Born: Thomas Phillip Puccio; November 12, 1944; Brooklyn, New York City
- Died: March 11, 2012 (aged 67)
- Education: Fordham University School of Law
- Occupation: Trial attorney
- Years active: 1969 - 2012

Thomas Phillip Puccio (September 12, 1944 – March 11, 2012) was an American trial attorney who served in the United States Department of Justice, including as an investigator and prosecutor in the Abscam case, before working as a criminal defense lawyer representing high-profile clients such as Claus von Bülow.

== Early life ==
Puccio was born in 1944 in Brooklyn, New York, to Matthew and Jeanette Puccio. He attended Brooklyn Preparatory School before going on to Fordham University (graduating in 1966) and Fordham University School of Law (graduating in 1969).

== Career ==
After law school he joined the Brooklyn office of the United States Attorney for the Eastern District of New York as an assistant prosecutor. He became the office's chief of criminal division in 1973 and two years later became executive assistant to the United States Attorney, David G. Trager. In 1976, he became the head of the Organized Crime Strike Force for the Eastern District of New York.

== Abscam ==
Puccio supervised the two-year Abscam undercover investigation, along with Assistant Director Neil Welch, who headed the Federal Bureau of Investigation's New York division. In 1980 and 1981, he was the chief prosecutor in four of the eight trials resulting from the investigation. He secured the convictions of several elected officials, including U.S. senator Harrison A. Williams, U.S. Rep. Michael J. Myers, and Camden, New Jersey mayor Angelo Errichetti.

== Private practice ==
In 1982, after 13 years as a Justice Department attorney, Puccio went into private practice, joining the Manhattan law firm of Booth, Lipton & Lipton. He joined Stroock & Stroock & Lavan in 1985, and then Milbank, Tweed, Hadley & McCloy in 1987. He established his own firm in 1992.

In 1985, Puccio secured the acquittal of the British-Danish socialite Claus von Bülow after von Bülow was tried a second time on charges of attempting to murder his wife Martha by means of insulin injections. The second trial was held after a 1982 conviction was successfully appealed by Harvard Law School professor Alan Dershowitz.

Puccio defended Bronx Democratic leader Stanley M. Friedman in 1986 on corruption charges. Friedman was convicted and sentenced to 12 years in a racketeering trial prosecuted by then-U.S. Attorney Rudy Giuliani. The same year, he represented John J. McLaughlin, former president of New York City Health and Hospitals Corporation, charged with bribery and stealing $250,000 from Maytag heiress Ann L. Maytag. McLaughlin was found guilty of forgery and larceny but acquitted of more serious charges.

In 1997, Puccio defended Alex Kelly, who was charged with committing two rapes in Darien, Connecticut, ten years earlier. Kelly was convicted for one of the rapes and sentenced to 16 years in prison. In the second trial, Kelly pleaded no contest, with a sentence of 10 years running concurrently with the sentence in the first trial.

== Death ==
Puccio died of leukemia in 2012 at the age of 67.

== In popular culture ==
The 1981 film Prince of the City features a character loosely based on Puccio: Assistant U.S. Attorney George Polito, played by James Tolkan.

In the 2013 film American Hustle, which dramatized the Abscam sting operation, Alessandro Nivola played Anthony Amado, a fictionalized version of Puccio.
