= 3rd AACTA International Awards =

Australian film and TV awards ceremony in 2014

- Date: 10 January 2014
- Site: Sunset Marquis; West Hollywood, Los Angeles, California
- Hosted by: Geoffrey Rush

Highlights
- Best Film: Gravity
- Most awards: 12 Years a Slave, American Hustle, Gravity (2)
- Most nominations: American Hustle (7)

Television coverage
- Network: Arena

The 3rd Australian Academy of Cinema and Television Arts International Awards (commonly known as the AACTA International Awards), were presented by the Australian Academy of Cinema and Television Arts (AACTA), a non-profit organisation whose aim is to identify, award, promote and celebrate Australia's greatest achievements in film and television. Awards were handed out for the best films of 2013 regardless of geography, and are the international counterpart to the awards for Australian films (held on 28 and 30 January). The ceremony took place at Sunset Marquis in Los Angeles, California on 10 January 2014 and will be televised in Australia on 12 January on the Arena network.

The nominees were announced on 14 December 2013. 12 Years a Slave, American Hustle and Gravity won two awards each, with the latter film winning Best Film. Blue Jasmine was the only other winning film, with one for Best Actress.

== Background ==
The winners and nominees were chosen by the international chapter of the Academy, which comprises eighty members of Australian filmmakers and executives. The finalists in each category were revealed on 13 December 2013 with the winners announced on 10 January 2014 at Sunset Marquis located in West Hollywood, Los Angeles, California. Through a new partnership with Australian subscription television provider Foxtel, the awards, which are usually aired in snippets during the Australian awards ceremony, were televised as a separate presentation for the first time on Arena on 12 January 2014. Two awards for Best Supporting Actor and Best Supporting Actress were added, after being handed out as discretionary accolades the previous year. Additionally, a new lifetime achievement award, the Australian Academy of Cinema and Television Arts International Fellowship, was introduced and given to American film distributor Harvey Weinstein for his work in distributing Australian films internationally. The prize was presented to him on 23 November 2013, at the Canberra International Film Festival.

== Winners and nominees ==
In the following list, the winner is listed first and highlighted in boldface; those that are listed beneath the winner and not highlighted in boldface are the nominees.

Best Film – International	Best Direction – International
**Gravity**; 12 Years a Slave; American Hustle; Captain Phillips; Rush	**Alfonso Cuarón – Gravity**; Paul Greengrass – Captain Phillips; Baz Luhrmann – The Great Gatsby; Steve McQueen – 12 Years a Slave; David O. Russell – American Hustle
Best Actor – International	Best Actress – International
**Chiwetel Ejiofor – 12 Years a Slave as Solomon Northup**; Christian Bale – American Hustle as Irving Rosenfeld; Leonardo DiCaprio – The Wolf of Wall Street as Jordan Belfort; Tom Hanks – Captain Phillips as Captain Richard Phillips; Matthew McConaughey – Dallas Buyers Club as Ron Woodroof	**Cate Blanchett – Blue Jasmine as Jeanette “Jasmine” Francis**; Amy Adams – American Hustle as Sydney Prosser / Lady Edith Greensly; Sandra Bullock – Gravity as Dr. Ryan Stone; Judi Dench – Philomena as Philomena Lee; Meryl Streep – August: Osage County as Violet Weston
Best Supporting Actor – International	Best Supporting Actress – International
**Michael Fassbender – 12 Years a Slave as Edwin Epps**; Bradley Cooper – American Hustle as Richie DiMaso; Joel Edgerton – The Great Gatsby as Tom Buchanan; Jared Leto – Dallas Buyers Club as Rayon; Geoffrey Rush – The Book Thief as Hans Hubermann	**Jennifer Lawrence – American Hustle as Rosalyn Rosenfeld**; Sally Hawkins – Blue Jasmine as Ginger; Lupita Nyong'o – 12 Years a Slave as Patsey; Julia Roberts – August: Osage County as Barbara Weston-Fordham; Octavia Spencer – Fruitvale Station as Wanda Johnson
Best Screenplay – International
**Eric Warren Singer and David O. Russell – American Hustle**; Woody Allen – Blue Jasmine; Joel and Ethan Coen – Inside Llewyn Davis; Kelly Marcel and Sue Smith – Saving Mr. Banks; John Ridley – 12 Years a Slave

== See also ==
- 3rd AACTA Awards
- 19th Critics’ Choice Awards
- 20th Screen Actors Guild Awards
- 67th British Academy Film Awards
- 71st Golden Globe Awards
- 86th Academy Awards
