= Stanley M. Friedman =

American politician

Deputy Mayor of New York City for Intergovernmental Affairs
- In office 1975–1977

Chairman of the Executive Committee of the Bronx County Democratic Committee
- In office 1978–1987
- Preceded by: Patrick J. Cunningham
- Succeeded by: George Friedman

Personal details
- Born: March 18, 1936 (age 90)
- Party: Democratic
- Education: City College of New York and Brooklyn Law School
- Occupation: Politician, hotelier

Stanley Melvin Friedman (born March 18, 1936) is a former head of the Bronx County Democratic Committee (known colloquially as the Bronx Democratic Party), a former Deputy Mayor of New York City, and later hotelier.

== Early life ==
Friedman was born in the Bronx on March 18, 1936, and grew up in the Hunts Point district, where he was nicknamed "Bugsy." He graduated from Stuyvesant High School in 1953, the City College of New York in 1958 and Brooklyn Law School in 1961.

== Political career ==
Friedman was a lawyer for the Federal Trade Commission before serving as an assistant district attorney in the Bronx. He was an associate counsel to longtime New York City Council Majority Leader Thomas J. Cuite when he became the Deputy Mayor of New York City for Intergovernmental Affairs on January 2, 1975, reporting to Mayor Abe Beame. Friedman remained in the role until the end of Beame's term in December 1977, when Beame gave Friedman a lifetime appointment to the Board of Water Supply, a part-time job that came with a salary of $25,000 (equal to $107,509 in 2021 dollars), a limousine, and a secretary.

Mayor Ed Koch pressed Friedman to resign the position in May 1978, as Friedman received Koch's support to take control of the Democratic Party in the Bronx; however, Koch denied a connection between the resignation and his endorsement.

In 1978 Friedman became the leader of the Bronx chapter of the New York State Democratic Party ("Chairman of the Executive Committee of the Bronx County Democratic Committee"). He was succeeded in 1987 by New York State Assemblyman George Friedman, who was unrelated to his predecessor. Also, in 1978, he became a law partner to Roy Cohn at the firm of Saxe, Bacon & Bolan.

He was indicted on civil charges involving the New York City Parking Violations Bureau on March 27, 1986. He was defended in that case by Thomas P. Puccio. Friedman was later convicted on federal corruption charges in that case, which was presided over by Whitman Knapp and prosecuted by Rudy Giuliani. He was removed as the Bronx Democratic Party leader when he was sentenced to a 12-year prison term on March 12, 1987; concurrently, longtime protégé/factotum Stanley Simon resigned from the Bronx borough presidency amid pending criminal charges related to the contemporaneous Wedtech scandal. In this subordinate role, Simon had served as the principal executor of Friedman's political capital as a statutory voting member of the now-defunct New York City Board of Estimate since 1979. Friedman served four years in prison before his release in 1992.

== Post-political career ==
Having been barred for life from participating in politics and practicing law upon his conviction, Friedman became a hotelier following his release from prison. He managed facilities in Staten Island.

Party political offices
Preceded by Patrick J. Cunningham	Chairman of the Executive Committee of the Bronx County Democratic Committee; 1978 – 1987	Succeeded by George Friedman
Government offices
Preceded by Judah Gribetz	Deputy Mayor of New York City for Intergovernmental Affairs; 1975 – 1978	Succeeded by ?
