= Abscam =

1970s–1980s FBI sting operation

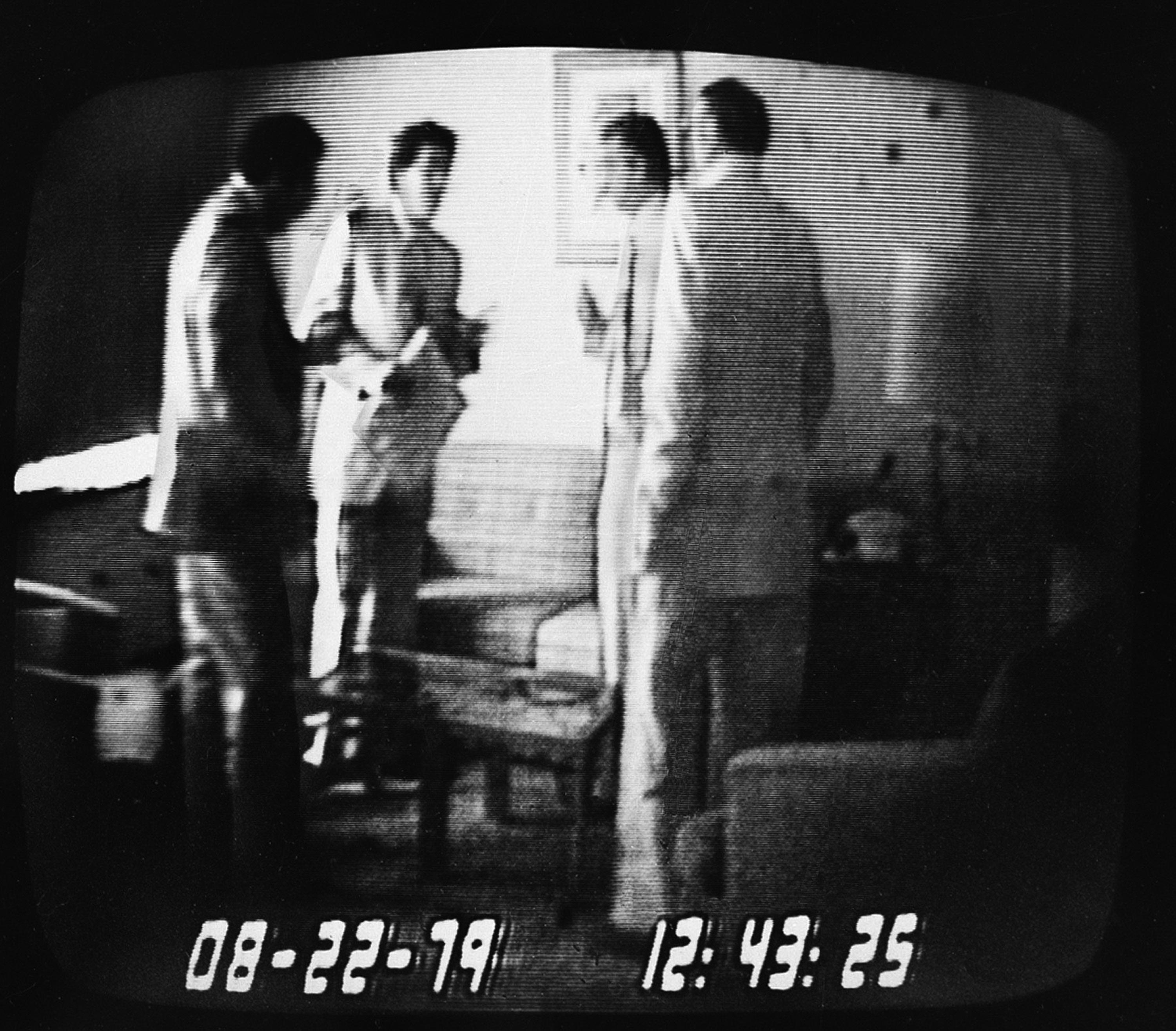
U.S. representative Michael Myers, second from left, holds an envelope containing $50,000 that he just received from undercover FBI agents

Abscam, sometimes written ABSCAM, was a Federal Bureau of Investigation (FBI) sting operation in the late 1970s and early 1980s that led to the convictions of seven members from both chambers of the United States Congress and others for bribery and corruption. The two-year investigation initially targeted trafficking in stolen property and corruption of prominent business people, but later evolved into a corruption investigation. The FBI was aided by the United States Department of Justice and convict Mel Weinberg in videotaping politicians accepting bribes from a fictitious Arabian company in return for various political favors.

More than 30 political figures were investigated, and six members of the United States House of Representatives and one member of the United States Senate were convicted. One member of the New Jersey State Senate, members of the Philadelphia City Council, the Mayor of Camden, New Jersey, and an inspector for the Immigration and Naturalization Service were also convicted. The operation was directed from the FBI's office in Hauppauge, New York, on Long Island, and was conducted under the supervision of Assistant Director Neil Welch, who headed the bureau's New York division, and Thomas P. Puccio, head of the Justice Department's United States Organized Crime Strike Force for the Eastern District of New York.

"Abscam" was the FBI codename for the operation, which law enforcement authorities said was a contraction of "Arab scam". The American-Arab Relations Committee made complaints. Hence, officials revised the source of the contraction to "Abdul scam" after the name of its fictitious company.

== Operation ==
In March 1978, John F. Good of the FBI's office in suburban Long Island created and oversaw a sting operation called "Abscam", which was initially intended to investigate theft, forgery, and stolen art. The FBI employed Melvin Weinberg, a convicted swindler, international con artist and informant, and his girlfriend, Evelyn Knight, to help plan and conduct the operation. At that time they were facing a prison sentence and, in exchange for their help, the FBI agreed to let them out on probation. Weinberg, supervised by the FBI, created a fake company called Abdul Enterprises in which FBI employees posed as fictional Arab sheikhs led by owners Kambir Abdul Rahman and Yassir Habib, who had millions of dollars to invest in the United States. Weinberg instructed the FBI to fund a $1 million account with the Chase Manhattan Bank in the name of Abdul Enterprises, giving the company the credibility it needed to further its operation.

When a forger under investigation suggested to the sheikhs that they invest in casinos in New Jersey and that licensing could be obtained for a price, the Abscam operation was re-targeted toward political corruption. Each member of Congress who was approached would be given a large sum of money in exchange for "private immigration bills" to allow foreigners associated with Abdul Enterprises into the country and for building permits and licenses for casinos in Atlantic City, among other investment arrangements. Among the casino projects involved were the Ritz-Carlton Atlantic City, the Dunes Hotel and Casino (Atlantic City), the Penthouse Boardwalk Hotel and Casino, and the sheikh's fictional casino. The first political figure to participate in the phony investment scheme was Camden mayor Angelo Errichetti. In exchange for monetary kickbacks, Errichetti told the sheikhs' representatives, "I'll give you Atlantic City." Errichetti helped to recruit several government officials and United States members of Congress who were willing to grant political favors in exchange for monetary bribes (originally $100,000 but then reduced to $50,000).

The FBI recorded each money exchange and, for the first time in American history, surreptitiously videotaped government officials accepting bribes. The meeting places included a house owned by Lee Lescaze in the Foxhall neighborhood of Washington, D.C., a yacht in Florida, and hotel rooms in Pennsylvania and New Jersey.

Each convicted politician was given a separate trial. During these trials, much controversy arose regarding the ethics of Operation Abscam. Many lawyers defending their clients accused the FBI of entrapment. Though some judges concurred, appeals eventually overruled this claim and each politician was convicted.

== Convictions ==
Of the 31 targeted officials, the following members of Congress were convicted of bribery and conspiracy in 1981:

- US Senator Harrison A. Williams (D-NJ)
- US Representative Frank Thompson (D-NJ)
- US Representative John Jenrette (D-SC)
- US Representative Raymond Lederer (D-PA)
- US Representative Michael Myers (D-PA)
- US Representative John M. Murphy (D-NY)
- US Representative Richard Kelly (R-FL)

Five other government officials were convicted, including

- Mayor of Camden, New Jersey, Angelo Errichetti (D)
- Philadelphia, PA City Council President George X. Schwartz (D)
- Philadelphia, PA City Councilman Harry Jannotti (D)
- Philadelphia, PA City Councilman Louis Johanson (D)
- An inspector for the US Immigration and Naturalization Service

=== Angelo Errichetti ===
Angelo Errichetti, mayor of Camden, New Jersey, was the first government official to be caught in Operation Abscam. Errichetti first accepted the bribe in exchange for obtaining a casino license in Atlantic City for Abdul Enterprises. He then introduced Abdul to Senator Harrison Williams, who also took the bait. Errichetti also introduced Michael Myers and Raymond Lederer to the company and arranged meetings with the undercover agents. He also introduced the "Arab businessmen" to Frank Thompson Jr. By the middle of 1979, Errichetti had arranged meetings with a list of state and federal politicians willing to go in on the operation. The FBI set up video cameras in a hotel suite near New York's John F. Kennedy Airport to record the transactions between the undercover agents and Errichetti. He was convicted on the federal bribery charges, for which he served about three years in prison.

=== Harrison A. Williams ===
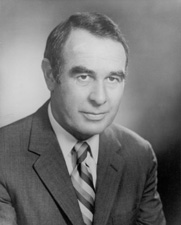
Harrison A. Williams

Senator Harrison A. Williams (D-NJ) was indicted on October 30, 1980, and convicted on May 1, 1981, on nine counts of bribery and conspiracy to use his office to aid in business ventures. Williams repeatedly met with the FBI agents and had worked out a deal where he would become involved in a titanium mining operation by way of having 18% of the company's shares issued to his lawyer, Alexander Feinberg. Williams then promised to steer government contracts to the venture by using his position in the Senate.

At his trial, lawyers for Williams argued that he had not been bribed because the stock in the titanium mining company was worthless. Other defenses attempting to have the charges dismissed included that he was a victim of selective prosecution by the Justice Department because he had supported the presidential bid of Ted Kennedy over Jimmy Carter in the Democratic primary. These premises were not accepted by the jury, who convicted Williams after 28 hours of deliberation on May 1, 1981. Later appeals made by Williams included arguments that a main prosecution witness had perjured himself and that Williams had been a victim of entrapment. The guilty verdict was upheld, and Williams was sentenced to three years in prison.

Because of the convictions, the Senate Ethics Committee voted to censure Williams and put a motion to the floor to expel him for charges of bringing dishonor upon the Senate and his "ethically repugnant behavior". Supporters of Williams moved that the censure was enough and that the expulsion was unnecessary. The Senate voted to censure Williams, but before the vote on his expulsion could occur, Williams resigned his seat. In his resignation speech, Williams proclaimed his innocence. He argued that the investigation into his activities was a grievous assault on the rights of the Senate and that other senators should be wary of unchecked investigations into their activities by other branches of the government.

Williams served two years of his three-year sentence at a federal penitentiary in Newark, New Jersey. He served the remainder of his term at the Integrity House halfway house, where he later became a board of directors member until his death by cancer on November 17, 2001. He also attempted to receive a presidential pardon from President Bill Clinton, but his request was denied. Williams was the first Senator to be imprisoned in almost 80 years, and, had the expulsion motion been approved, would have been the first Senator to be expelled from the Senate since the Civil War.

Linguistics expert Roger Shuy is convinced of Williams' innocence. In a recording of Williams' encounter with an agent disguised as a sheikh, "At one point, the sheikh put the bribe directly to Williams: 'I would like to give you . . . some money for, for permanent residence.' The first four words of Williams' reply were 'No, no, no, no.'" A prosecution memo at the time stated that there was no case against Williams but the judge, who in his ruling decried "the cynicism and hypocrisy of corrupt government officials", set it aside. After the trial, the lead juror said that had he known all the facts, he would not have found Williams guilty.

=== Frank Thompson ===
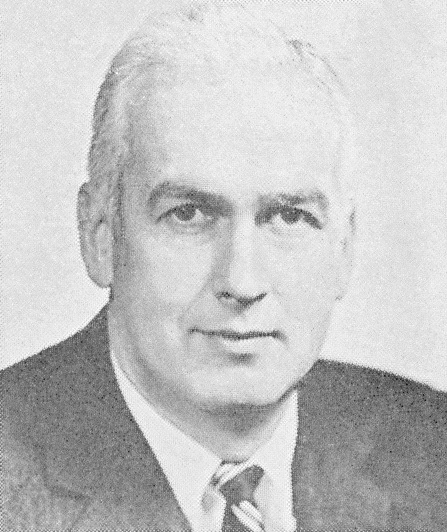
Frank Thompson

Frank Thompson (D-NJ) was a member of the House from Trenton, New Jersey, who was indicted and convicted of accepting a bribe from an FBI agent posing as an Arab sheikh. Thompson was offered money in exchange for helping the Arabs overcome certain immigration laws. Well-liked by his constituents, he was the longest-serving member of Congress convicted in Operation Abscam.

Thompson abstained on the vote to expel Representative Myers, the first Congressman to be indicted. While most of the politicians resigned, Myers was expelled from the House, and Williams did not resign until the vote on his expulsion was almost to take place. Thompson himself was not expelled from the House of Representatives because he lost his re-election campaign in 1980 to Republican Chris Smith, a relatively unknown candidate who in 1978 had run against Thompson as a sacrificial lamb candidate. Smith won the 1980 election by a margin of 20,000 votes. On December 29, 1980, Thompson resigned his seat in the US House of Representatives. Smith has continuously represented Thompson's former district through the 119th United States Congress.

On December 2, 1980, Thompson was indicted on bribery charges. Thompson spent $24,000 of campaign funds fighting the charges and appealing his conviction on grounds of entrapment. Thompson was convicted of bribery and conspiracy charges and sentenced to three years in prison, starting in 1983. He served two years before being released and worked as a consultant in Washington until he died in 1989.

=== John M. Murphy ===
Thompson introduced John M. Murphy to the operation. Murphy was from Staten Island, New York. He was chair of the Committee on the Merchant Marine and Fisheries. He accepted monetary bribes in exchange for his resources. Murphy's conviction differed from the other Congressmen. His conviction was considered "receiving an unlawful gratuity" instead of bribery, but he served three years in prison for conspiracy charges only. Murphy was not filmed taking the $50,000 that most other participants took that day, instead arguing on tape with attorney Howard Criden about who would pick up Murphy's money for him, which Criden did at a John F. Kennedy airport hotel.

=== Richard Kelly ===
In 1982, the conviction of Richard Kelly was appealed on the grounds of entrapment. Kelly, the sole Republican, said that he was only pretending to be involved with the bribery from Abdul Enterprises. He claimed that he was conducting his own operation dealing with corruption and that the FBI was ruining his own investigation. However, an appeals court upheld the conviction, and Kelly served 13 months in prison.

=== John Jenrette ===
John Jenrette was one of the few who resigned before being expelled from the House. During the operation, Jenrette was asked by an undercover FBI agent if he would take the bribe from the Sheikh. He replied, "I've got larceny in my blood. I'd take it in a goddamn minute."

== Also approached by the FBI ==
=== John Murtha ===
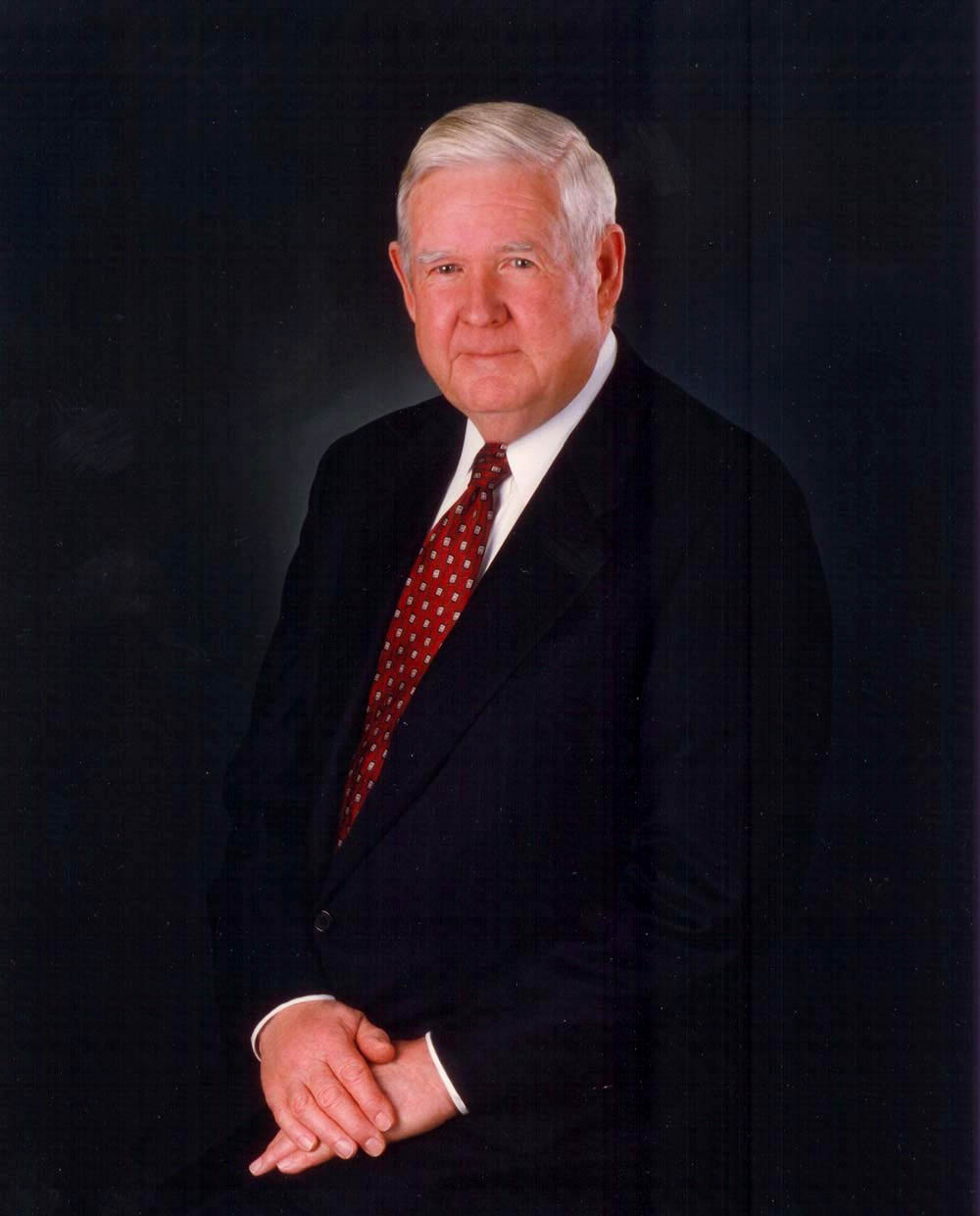
John Murtha

John Murtha (D-PA) was one of the Congressmen who refused to take the bribe from the undercover agents. He too was videotaped in his encounter with undercover FBI operatives. Although he was never convicted or prosecuted, he was named an unindicted co-conspirator in the scandal. As such, he testified against Frank Thompson (D-NJ) and John Murphy (D-NY), the two Congressmen mentioned as participants in the deal at the same meeting. A short clip from the videotape shows Murtha stating, "I'm not interested, I'm sorry. At this point..." in direct response to an offer of $50,000 in cash.

In November 1980, the Justice Department announced that Murtha would not face prosecution for his part in the scandal. The U.S. Attorney's Office reasoned that Murtha intended to obtain investment in his district. Full-length viewing of the tape shows Murtha citing prospective investment opportunities that could return "500 or 1,000" miners to work. In July 1981, the House Ethics Committee also chose not to file charges against Murtha following a mostly party-line vote. The resignation later that day of attorney E. Barrett Prettyman Jr., the panel's special counsel and a Democrat, has been interpreted as an act of protest.

Murtha remained prominent in Congress and was re-elected by his constituency 19 times over 36 years before his death on February 8, 2010.

=== Larry Pressler ===
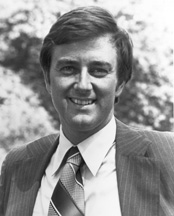
Larry Pressler

Senator Larry Pressler (R-SD) refused to take the bribe, saying at the time, "Wait a minute, what you are suggesting may be illegal." He immediately reported the incident to the FBI. When Senator Pressler was told that Walter Cronkite referred to him on the evening news as a "hero", he stated, "I do not consider myself a hero... what have we come to if turning down a bribe is 'heroic'?"

=== Bob Guccione ===
Bob Guccione, publisher of Penthouse, was also approached with a bribe from the undercover FBI agents. Guccione was in the process of building the Penthouse Boardwalk Hotel and Casino in Atlantic City and needed financing. He was associated with Abscam's interest in Atlantic City, so Weinberg approached him and told him that an Arab sheikh wanted to invest $150 million in the casino project, but only if the casino had obtained a gaming license. Weinberg wanted Guccione to pay a $300,000 bribe to New Jersey gaming officials to get the license. Guccione refused and said, "Are you out of your mind?" After the Abscam scandal came to light, Guccione sued the federal government but lost.

=== Joseph A. Maressa ===
In 1980, New Jersey State Senate member Joseph A. Maressa accepted $10,000 from a group of FBI agents who were part of the Abscam undercover operation. The money was given to Maressa on behalf of a fictional Arab sheikh in exchange for Maressa's efforts to get legislative support to obtain a gambling license for a casino in Atlantic City. Maressa justified accepting what he described as legal fees, saying, "I felt like it would be patriotic to take some of this OPEC oil money and get it back to the United States." Maressa was not prosecuted for his actions.

== Conclusion ==
When the investigation became public in the early 1980s, ethical controversy focused on using the "sting" technique and Weinberg's involvement in selecting targets. Although Weinberg was a previously convicted criminal involved in previous scams, he avoided a three-year prison sentence and was paid $150,000 in concurrence with the operation. Ultimately, all of the Abscam convictions were upheld on appeal, although some judges criticized the tactics used by the FBI and lapses in FBI and DOJ supervision.

In the wake of Abscam, Attorney General Benjamin Civiletti issued "The Attorney General Guidelines for FBI Undercover Operations" ("Civiletti Undercover Guidelines") on January 5, 1981. These were the first Attorney General Guidelines for undercover operations and formalized procedures necessary to conduct undercover operations to avoid future controversy. Following the initial press accounts about the Abscam investigation, Congress held a series of hearings to examine FBI undercover operations and the new Civiletti Undercover Guidelines. The House Subcommittee on Civil and Constitutional Rights began hearings on FBI undercover operations in March 1980 and concluded with a report in April 1984. Among the concerns expressed during the hearings were the undercover agents' involvement in illegal activity, the possibility of entrapping individuals, the prospect of damaging the reputations of innocent civilians, and the opportunity to undermine legitimate privacy rights.

In March 1982, after the Senate debated a resolution to expel Senator Williams for his conduct in Abscam, the Senate established the Select Committee to Study Undercover Activities. In December 1982, the Committee issued its final report, which generally supported the undercover technique but observed that its use "creates serious risks to citizens' property, privacy, and civil liberties, and may compromise law enforcement itself".

FBI documents later disclosed in accordance with the Freedom of Information Act, consisting of newspaper clippings and letters written to the FBI, revealed a mixed response from the American public. Some Americans supported the FBI, but others argued that Abscam was an entrapment scenario ordered by a revenge-minded FBI, which earlier had been stung by Congressional inquiries into acts of police brutality and similar widespread abuses. Congressional concern about sting operations persisted, creating numerous additional guidelines in the ensuing years:

- The Civiletti Guidelines: 1980–1981
- The Smith Guidelines: 1983
- The Thornburgh Guidelines: 1989
- The Reno Guidelines: 2001

During Abscam, the FBI handed out more than $400,000 in "bribes" to Congressmen and middlemen.

In his book, The Dangers of Dissent, historian Ivan Greenberg suggests that the FBI's aggressive investigation of political corruption might have been a response to the years of criticism the agency had received from Congressional investigations: "Was this [ABSCAM] payback for the Church Committee hearings? The FBI wanted to punish the Congress for exposing its past corruption." Greenberg cites FBI Director William Webster's 1980 speech to the Atlanta Bar Association as evidence. Webster stated, "In the FBI we've been under attack for past incidents and circumstances. It's quite understandable for those in Congress who love their institution, who are trying to rebuild its reputation and the confidence of the American people, to have an encounter and deal with a situation of this kind, and emotions run high. It's my sense that the good sense of the Congress, similar to the emotions in the Bureau when they had their times, that now people are saying, well, let's wait and see what the facts are..." However, Greenberg does not provide evidence beyond this public comparison for his allegation.

== In popular culture ==
=== Movies ===
- French director Louis Malle adapted the Abscam story into a film script titled Moon Over Miami, with Dan Aykroyd and John Belushi set to star, with Belushi playing a fictionalized version of Weinberg. Belushi's death in March 1982 scuttled plans for the film. The script was co-written with John Guare, who also co-wrote Atlantic City, also by Malle, who would turn the unproduced screenplay into a play of the same name.
- The 1989 miniseries Family of Spies, which starred Powers Boothe as Soviet spy John Walker made an indirect reference to Abscam. When Walker's compatriot Jerry Whitworth has second thoughts due to potential FBI involvement, Walker confidently remarks "The FBI is too busy dressing up like Arabs to entrap Congressmen" to focus on espionage.
- In the 1997 film Donnie Brasco, and 2003 film, Runaway Jury, Abscam is mentioned.
- The Abscam operation is dramatized in the 2013 feature film American Hustle, directed by David O. Russell, which received ten Academy Award nominations. The film is described as a "fictionalization" rather than a straight adaptation. The opening screen states, "Some of this actually happened."

=== Television ===
- Saturday Night Live parodied the scandal in a skit titled "The Bel-Airabs" (a spoof of The Beverly Hillbillies), February 9, 1980.
- Fridays parodied the scandal in a skit titled "Abscam Camera" (a spoof of Candid Camera).
- The incident was referenced in the Seinfeld episode "The Sniffing Accountant".
- Abscam was also mentioned as an insult to an FBI agent on an episode of Simon & Simon.
- In Dallas episode "The Fall of the House of Ewing", an FBI agent attempts to get J. R. Ewing to offer a bribe to a government official. However, J.R. notices the hidden camera and denies wanting to offer a bribe. The undercover FBI agent is upset and says, "I don't understand how this happened; I even nailed a couple of those ABSCAM guys".
- It was referenced in an episode of The Jeffersons titled "The Defiant Ones" when Louise asks a fellow inmate if she was in jail for prostitution, and she replies, "No, we're three of the Abscam senators."

=== Music ===
- Prince refers to the Abscam story in the track "Annie Christian" from his 1981 album Controversy.
- In 1980, folk singer Tom Paxton wrote and recorded the song "I Thought You Were an Arab" (pronounced Ay'-rab) on his album The Paxton Report.
- In 2019, indie rock artist David Berman sang the lyric "Got a comb over cut circa Abscam sting" on the song "Storyline Fever".

=== Print media ===
- A 1981 Bloom County comic strip in which Milo Bloom envisions himself as a senator on trial has him accused of (among many things) "taking money from FBI agents posing as Arab camel scalpers". A later strip showed Milo attempting the same thing when working as a reporter for the local paper, the Beacon, only for Senator Bedfellow to state he knows he is Milo. Milo claims he is an Arab and will show ID, asking Bedfellow to hold the bribe money while he retrieves the ID, only for the picture to be snapped and a misleading headline of "Caught!" published.
- In the July 1981 issue of Superman Family, Lois Lane becomes involved in a copycat Abscam plot.
- The Doonesbury comics also parody the investigation; they show congressmen claiming that they were doing the sting operation to bust FBI agents who were bribing elected officials and working for foreign organizations hostile to the United States.

=== Video games ===
- In 1982, a modified version of Pac-Man was unofficially created to satirize the investigation. In the game, the player takes control of a congressman (Pac-Man) who runs around Washington, DC, collecting dollar bills while avoiding FBI vans (the ghosts). By grabbing a large dollar sign (energizer), the player can 'influence' the FBI vans into retreating.

== See also ==
- Operation Greylord
- Operation Tennessee Waltz
