= Neil Welch =

American FBI agent

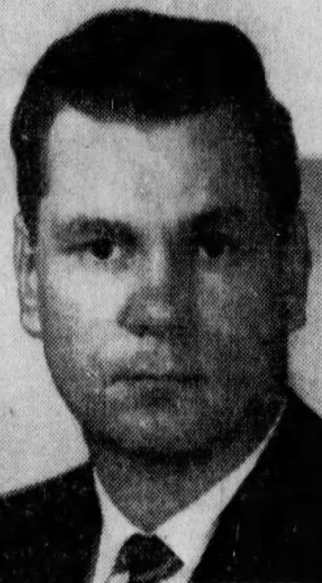
- Welch in 1968
- Born: August 9, 1926; Saint Paul, Minnesota, U.S.
- Died: June 29, 2017 (aged 90)
- Education: Omaha University; Creighton University Law School
- Occupation: FBI agent

Neil John Welch (August 9, 1926 – June 29, 2017), nicknamed "Jaws", was an American FBI agent. He was perhaps best known for masterminding in the Abscam sting operation.

== Life and career ==
Welch was born in Saint Paul, Minnesota. He attended North High School, Omaha University and Creighton University Law School.

In 1951, Welch joined the FBI as a special agent. He retired in 1980.

Welch died on June 29, 2017, at the age of 90.
