= Mel Weinberg =

American con artist and Abscam informant (1924–2018)

- Born: December 4, 1924; The Bronx, New York, U.S.
- Died: May 30, 2018 (aged 93); Titusville, Florida, U.S.
- Known for: Informant in Abscam FBI sting operation in the late 1970s and early 1980s
- Spouses: Mary O'Connor (1944–1962) Marie Weinberg (died. 1982); Evelyn Knight (m. 1982; div. 1998)

Melvin Weinberg (December 4, 1924 – May 30, 2018) was an American con artist, charlatan and federal government informant who is known for his involvement in a sting operation in the late 1970s and early 1980s known as Abscam. At the time of the scandal, he was a convict hired by the Federal Bureau of Investigation to conduct the operation in exchange for a sentence of probation on pending charges and a payment of $150,000. The two-year investigation initially targeted trafficking in stolen property and corruption of prominent businessmen, but later evolved into a public corruption investigation. The FBI, aided by the Justice Department, was able to videotape various politicians and other officials accepting bribes from a fictitious Arabian company in return for various political favors. This led to the convictions of seven members of the United States Congress, among others.

His story was portrayed in the 2013 film American Hustle, with Christian Bale playing Irving Rosenfeld, a character based on Weinberg.

Weinberg was born in The Bronx, the son of Helen and Harry Weinberg. His mother was of Swiss descent and his father was of Russian Jewish ancestry. After dropping out of school in ninth grade, he served in the United States Navy in the Pacific from 1942 to 1946. He retired to Titusville, Florida. He died on May 30, 2018, aged 93.
