= Evelyn Knight =

English con artist and socialite (born 1942)

- Born: 5 November 1942 (age 83); Watford, Hertfordshire, England
- Occupations: Con artist, socialite
- Spouse: Mel Weinberg (m. 1982; div. 1998)

Evelyn Dawn Knight (born 5 November 1942) is an English woman known for her involvement in the Abscam sting operation of the 1970s, with her then-husband Mel Weinberg. A character inspired by her was portrayed on film by Amy Adams in American Hustle (2013) for which Adams was nominated for the Academy Award for Best Actress. The story of Abscam was depicted as well in the 1981 book The Sting Man by Robert Greene.

== Personal life ==
Knight was born in Watford, England, the daughter of Peggy (née Wilson) and Bob Knight. Her father was a postman.

Knight emigrated to the United States in 1967, when she was in her late twenties. At a party on Long Island sponsored by the British government, she met Mel Weinberg, a Jewish businessman 17 years her senior, and the two began a long love affair. Weinberg was married to his second wife, Marie, at the time. Marie died by suicide in 1982 at age 58. She had confronted Knight about the affair after she learned that Knight was living nearby in a house being paid for by Weinberg. Soon after Marie's death, Knight and Weinberg married.

== Abscam ==
Weinberg began involving Evelyn in his cons, using her as a ploy to conduct business. He would introduce her as Lady Evelyn Knight, one of the world's richest women. The two were arrested in 1977 on charges of fraud and conspiracy. They made a plea deal with the FBI to help them in the investigation of Abscam, and in return, their charges would be dropped for probation.

== Later life ==
Knight kept out of the spotlight once the Abscam era ended, and moved to Florida with her husband Mel. They divorced in 1998, but still lived near each other until his death in 2018. Knight found work at NASA, where she took care of animals used in space experiments.

== Portrayals in the media ==
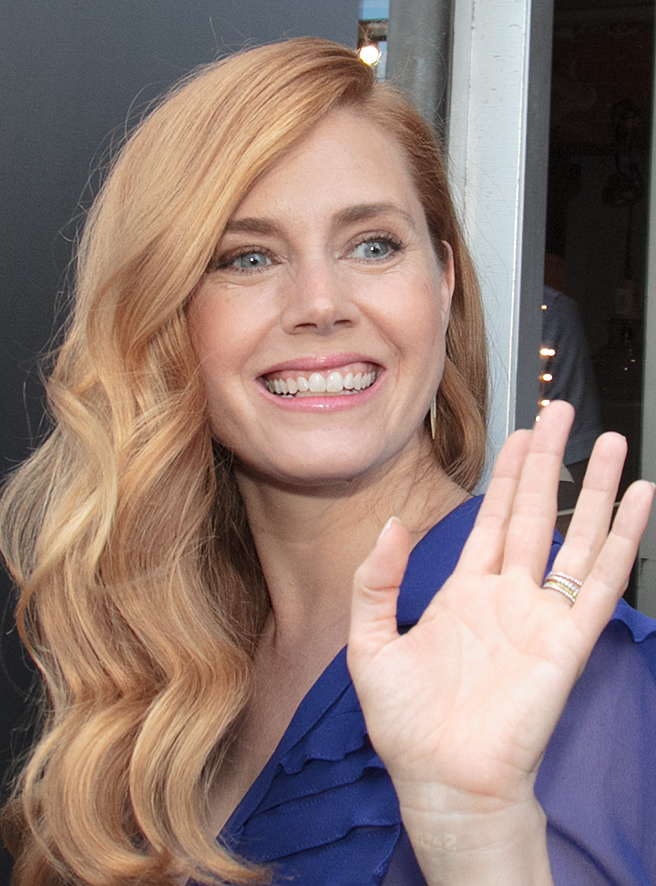
Amy Adams portrayed a fictionalized version of Knight, known as Sydney Prosser and Edith Greensly, in American Hustle.

Amy Adams was cast as a character based on Knight for the 2013 American black comedy-crime film American Hustle, written and directed by David O. Russell. The film was nominated for 10 Academy Awards, including Best Picture. Adams was nominated for Best Actress for her performance. The script for the film made changes from Knight’s story, including portraying the character as an American named Sydney Prosser who pretended to be British as a way to conduct scams. In the film, the character Prosser gave her British alter-ego the name of Edith Greensly.
