= List of accolades received by the Before trilogy =

Accolades received by American film series

Before trilogy accolades
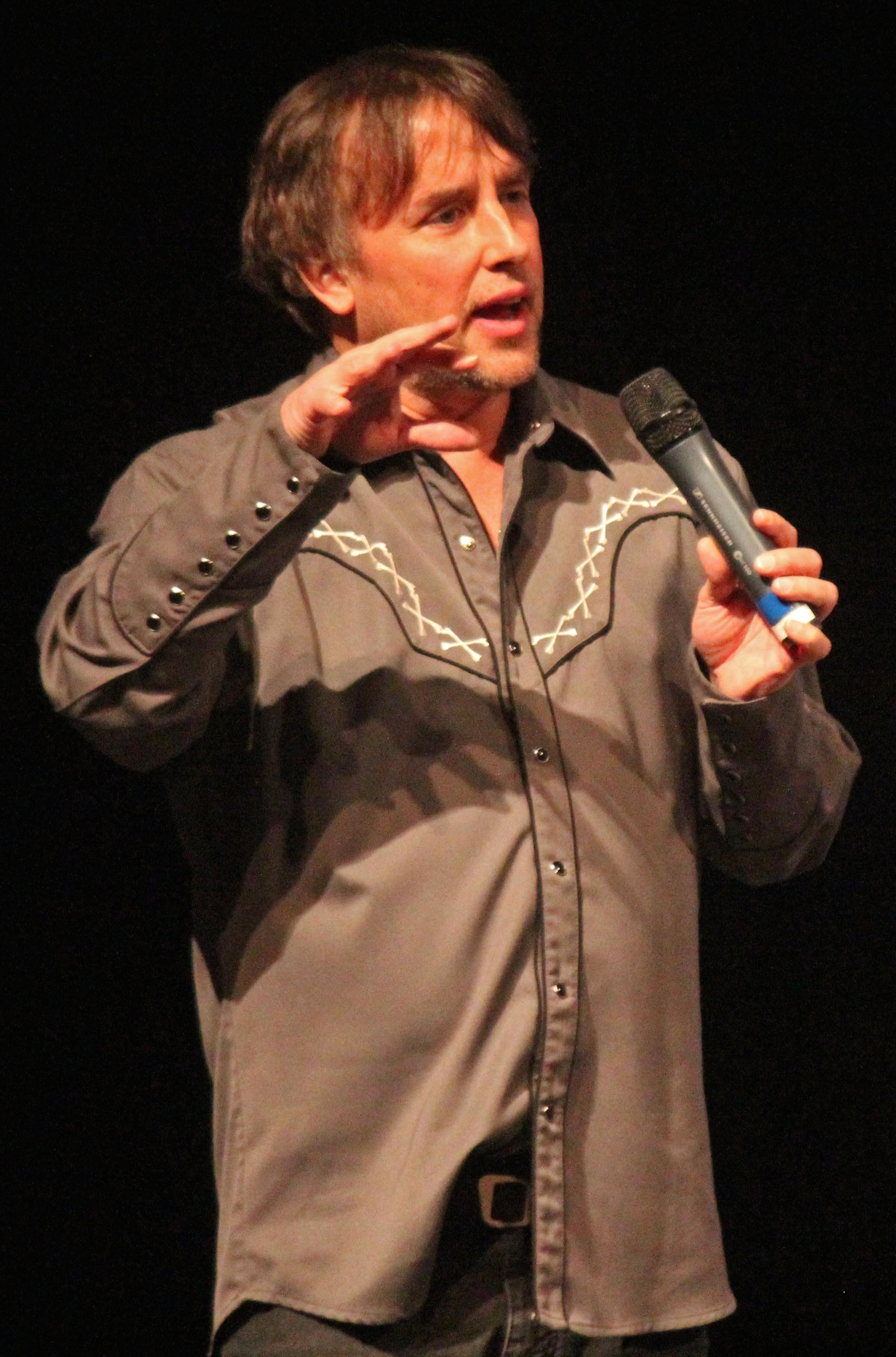
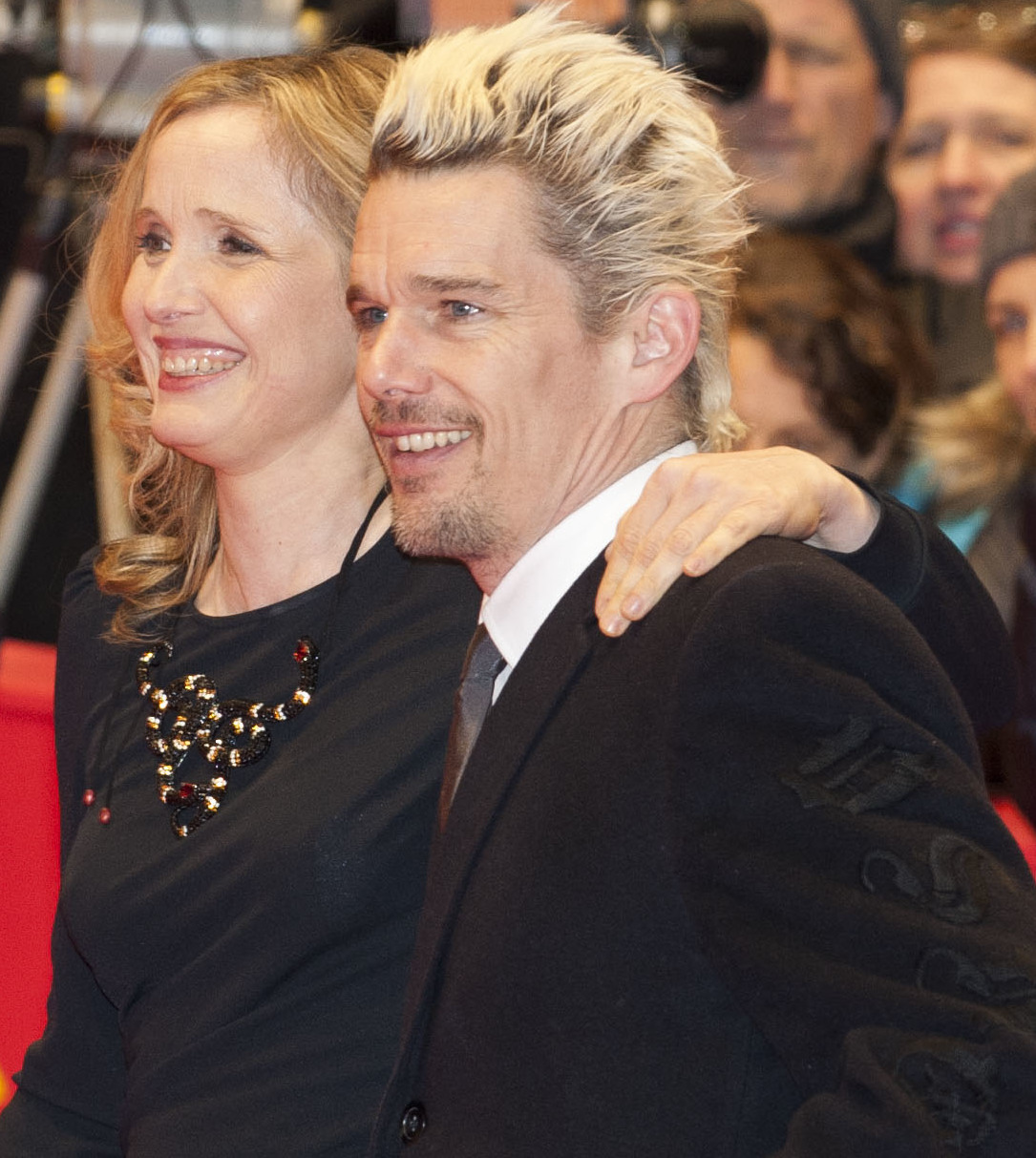
- From left to right: Richard Linklater, Julie Delpy, and Ethan Hawke received several accolades for their screenplays for Before Sunset and Before Midnight.
Accolades
Award	Wins	Nominations
Academy Awards	0	2
AARP Movies for Grownups Awards	1	2
Alliance of Women Film Journalists Awards	0	1
Austin Film Critics Association Awards	2	2
Berlin International Film Festival	1	3
Bodil Awards	0	2
Boston Online Film Critics Association Awards	2	2
Boston Society of Film Critics Awards	1	1
Chicago Film Critics Association Awards	0	2
Critics' Choice Awards	1	2
Detroit Film Critics Society Awards	0	3
Dublin Film Critics' Circle Awards	6	6
Empire Awards	1	1
Film Independent Spirit Awards	0	3
Golden Globe Awards	0	1
Golden Trailer Awards	0	1
Gotham Awards	0	2
Hollywood Film Awards	1	1
Houston Film Critics Society Awards	0	2
IndieWire Critics Poll	5	5
International Cinephile Society Awards	3	4
Los Angeles Film Critics Association Awards	2	2
MTV Movie Awards	0	1
National Board of Review Awards	1	1
National Film Preservation Board	1	1
National Society of Film Critics Awards	5	5
New York Film Critics Online Awards	2	2
Online Film Critics Society Awards	0	6
Robert Awards	0	1
San Diego Film Critics Society Awards	1	1
San Francisco Film Critics Circle Awards	1	2
Satellite Awards	0	1
Silver Condor Awards	0	2
South by Southwest Film Festival	0	1
Southeastern Film Critics Association Awards	1	1
St. Louis Film Critics Association Awards	0	2
Toronto Film Critics Association Awards	2	2
Turkish Film Critics Association Awards	1	1
Vancouver Film Critics Circle Awards	0	1
Village Voice Film Poll	7	7
Washington D.C. Area Film Critics Association Awards	0	1
Women Film Critics Circle Awards	3	3
Writers Guild of America Awards	0	2

Totals (Note: Certain award groups do not simply award one winner. They acknowledge several different recipients, have runners-up, and have third place. Since this is a specific recognition and is different from losing an award, runner-up mentions are considered wins in this award tally. For simplification and to avoid errors, each award in this list has been presumed to have had a prior nomination.)
- Wins: 51
- Nominations: 94

The Before trilogy consists of three romantic drama films—Before Sunrise (1995), Before Sunset (2004), and Before Midnight (2013)—directed by Richard Linklater and starring Ethan Hawke and Julie Delpy. The films were written by Linklater, in collaboration with Kim Krizan for the first installment and with the lead actors for the sequels. The series follows the romantic relationship of Jesse (Hawke) and Céline (Delpy) across more than eighteen years. Each film is set over the course of several hours and features dialogue-driven storytelling that explores their relationship, personal identities, and differing perspectives. The Before trilogy explores themes of love, death, fate, nostalgia, temporality, existentialism, and urban wandering.

The series grossed $61.5 million worldwide against a combined budget of $8.2 million. (Note: Attributed to multiple references:) It was met with critical acclaim, (Note: Attributed to multiple references:) with particular praise for its screenplays, Linklater's direction, and the performances of Hawke and Delpy. (Note: Attributed to multiple references:) On the review aggregator website Rotten Tomatoes, the three films hold respective approval ratings of 100%, 94%, and 98%.

The trilogy received numerous accolades. Linklater won the Silver Bear for Best Director at the Berlin International Film Festival for Before Sunrise. In 2025, the film was selected by the National Film Preservation Board for preservation in the United States Library of Congress's National Film Registry. Before Sunset and Before Midnight were both nominated for the Bodil Award for Best English Language Film, the Gotham Independent Film Award for Best Feature, the Online Film Critics Society Award for Best Picture, and the Silver Condor Award for Best Foreign Film, with both screenplays also nominated at the Academy Awards, the Film Independent Spirit Awards, the Online Film Critics Society Awards, and the Writers Guild of America Awards. Before Sunset won Best Film in the Village Voice Film Poll, where Linklater was voted Best Director. Before Midnight's screenplay won several awards, including the National Society of Film Critics Award for Best Screenplay, while Delpy received a nomination for the Golden Globe Award for Best Actress in a Motion Picture – Musical or Comedy.

== Before Sunrise ==
Accolades received by Before Sunrise
Award	Date of ceremony	Category	Recipient(s)	Result	Ref(s).
Berlin International Film Festival	February 22, 1995	Silver Bear for Best Director	Richard Linklater	Won	
Berlin International Film Festival	February 22, 1995	Golden Bear	Before Sunrise	Nominated	
Chicago Film Critics Association Awards	March 12, 1996	Best Screenplay	Richard Linklater and Kim Krizan	Nominated	
MTV Movie Awards	June 10, 1995	Best Kiss	Julie Delpy and Ethan Hawke	Nominated	
National Film Preservation Board	January 29, 2026	Selection for the National Film Registry	Before Sunrise	Won	

== Before Sunset ==
Accolades received by Before Sunset
Award	Date of ceremony	Category	Recipient(s)	Result	Ref(s).
Academy Awards	February 27, 2005	Best Adapted Screenplay	Richard Linklater, Julie Delpy, Ethan Hawke, and Kim Krizan	Nominated	
Berlin International Film Festival	February 15, 2004	Golden Bear	Before Sunset	Nominated	
Bodil Awards	February 27, 2005	Best English Language Film	Before Sunset	Nominated	
Boston Society of Film Critics Awards	December 13, 2004	Best Film	Before Sunset	Runner-up	
Dublin Film Critics' Circle Awards	December 22, 2009	Best Film of the Decade	Before Sunset	19th Place (Note: Tied with Zodiac, Letters from Iwo Jima, Waltz with Bashir, and Irréversible)	
Empire Awards	March 13, 2005	Best Actress	Julie Delpy	Won	
Film Independent Spirit Awards	February 26, 2005	Best Screenplay	Richard Linklater, Julie Delpy, and Ethan Hawke	Nominated	
Gotham Awards	December 1, 2004	Best Feature	Before Sunset	Nominated	
IndieWire Critics Poll	December 22, 2009	Best Film of the Decade	Before Sunset	7th Place	
International Cinephile Society Awards	February 19, 2005	Best Picture	Before Sunset	Won	
International Cinephile Society Awards	February 4, 2018	15th Anniversary Award for All-Time Favorite Best Picture	Before Sunset	Nominated	
Los Angeles Film Critics Association Awards	December 11, 2004	Best Actress	Julie Delpy	Runner-up	
National Board of Review Awards	January 11, 2005	Special Recognition for Excellence in Filmmaking	Before Sunset	Won	
National Society of Film Critics Awards	January 9, 2005	Best Picture	Before Sunset	3rd Place	
National Society of Film Critics Awards	January 9, 2005	Best Actress	Julie Delpy	3rd Place	
National Society of Film Critics Awards	January 9, 2005	Best Screenplay	Richard Linklater, Julie Delpy, and Ethan Hawke	3rd Place	
New York Film Critics Online Awards	December 11, 2004	Top Films of the Year	Before Sunset	3rd Place	
Online Film Critics Society Awards	January 10, 2005	Best Picture	Before Sunset	Nominated	
Online Film Critics Society Awards	January 10, 2005	Best Actress	Julie Delpy	Nominated	
Online Film Critics Society Awards	January 10, 2005	Best Adapted Screenplay	Richard Linklater, Julie Delpy, and Ethan Hawke	Nominated	
San Francisco Film Critics Circle Awards	December 13, 2004	Best Actress	Julie Delpy	Won	
Silver Condor Awards	June 27, 2005	Best Foreign Film	Before Sunset	Nominated	
Southeastern Film Critics Association Awards	December 20, 2004	Best Film	Before Sunset	10th Place	
Vancouver Film Critics Circle Awards	January 20, 2005	Best Film	Before Sunset	Nominated	
Village Voice Film Poll	December 30, 2004	Best Film	Before Sunset	Won	
Village Voice Film Poll	December 30, 2004	Best Director	Richard Linklater	Won	
Village Voice Film Poll	December 30, 2004	Best Lead Performance	Julie Delpy	3rd Place	
Village Voice Film Poll	December 30, 2004	Best Screenplay	Richard Linklater, Julie Delpy, and Ethan Hawke	Runner-up	
Writers Guild of America Awards	February 19, 2005	Best Adapted Screenplay	Richard Linklater, Julie Delpy, Ethan Hawke, and Kim Krizan	Nominated	

== Before Midnight ==
Accolades received by Before Midnight
Award	Date of ceremony	Category	Recipient(s)	Result	Ref(s).
AARP Movies for Grownups Awards	February 10, 2014	Best Screenwriter	Richard Linklater, Julie Delpy, and Ethan Hawke	Won	
AARP Movies for Grownups Awards	February 10, 2014	Best Grownup Love Story	Before Midnight	Nominated	
Academy Awards	March 2, 2014	Best Adapted Screenplay	Richard Linklater, Julie Delpy, and Ethan Hawke	Nominated	
Alliance of Women Film Journalists Awards	December 19, 2013	Best Woman Screenwriter	Julie Delpy	Nominated	
Austin Film Critics Association Awards	December 17, 2013	Best Film	Before Midnight	8th Place	
Austin Film Critics Association Awards	December 17, 2013	Best Austin Film	Before Midnight	Won	
Bodil Awards	February 1, 2014	Best English Language Film	Before Midnight	Nominated	
Boston Online Film Critics Association Awards	December 7, 2013	Best Film	Before Midnight	5th Place	
Boston Online Film Critics Association Awards	December 7, 2013	Best Screenplay	Richard Linklater, Julie Delpy, and Ethan Hawke	Won	
Chicago Film Critics Association Awards	December 16, 2013	Best Adapted Screenplay	Richard Linklater, Julie Delpy, and Ethan Hawke	Nominated	
Critics' Choice Awards	January 16, 2014	Best Adapted Screenplay	Richard Linklater, Julie Delpy, and Ethan Hawke	Nominated	
Critics' Choice Awards	January 16, 2014	Louis XIII Genius Award	Richard Linklater, Julie Delpy, and Ethan Hawke (for the Before trilogy)	Won	
Detroit Film Critics Society Awards	December 13, 2013	Best Film	Before Midnight	Nominated	
Detroit Film Critics Society Awards	December 13, 2013	Best Actress	Julie Delpy	Nominated	
Detroit Film Critics Society Awards	December 13, 2013	Best Screenplay	Richard Linklater, Julie Delpy, and Ethan Hawke	Nominated	
Dublin Film Critics' Circle Awards	December 18, 2013	Best Film	Before Midnight	5th Place	
Dublin Film Critics' Circle Awards	December 18, 2013	Best Director	Richard Linklater	6th Place	
Dublin Film Critics' Circle Awards	December 18, 2013	Best Actor	Ethan Hawke	9th Place (Note: Tied with Daniel Brühl for Rush)	
Dublin Film Critics' Circle Awards	December 18, 2013	Best Actress	Julie Delpy	4th Place (Note: Tied with Emma Thompson for Saving Mr. Banks)	
Dublin Film Critics' Circle Awards	December 18, 2013	Best Screenplay	Richard Linklater, Julie Delpy, and Ethan Hawke	Won	
Film Independent Spirit Awards	March 1, 2014	Best Female Lead	Julie Delpy	Nominated	
Film Independent Spirit Awards	March 1, 2014	Best Screenplay	Richard Linklater, Julie Delpy, and Ethan Hawke	Nominated	
Golden Globe Awards	January 12, 2014	Best Actress in a Motion Picture – Musical or Comedy	Julie Delpy	Nominated	
Golden Trailer Awards	May 30, 2014	Best Romance	Before Midnight	Nominated	
Gotham Awards	December 2, 2013	Best Feature	Before Midnight	Nominated	
Hollywood Film Awards	October 21, 2013	Hollywood Screenwriter Award	Richard Linklater, Julie Delpy, and Ethan Hawke	Won	
Houston Film Critics Society Awards	December 15, 2013	Best Picture	Before Midnight	Nominated	
Houston Film Critics Society Awards	December 15, 2013	Best Screenplay	Richard Linklater, Julie Delpy, and Ethan Hawke	Nominated	
IndieWire Critics Poll	December 17, 2013	Best Film	Before Midnight	3rd Place	
IndieWire Critics Poll	December 17, 2013	Best Director	Richard Linklater	9th Place	
IndieWire Critics Poll	December 17, 2013	Best Screenplay	Richard Linklater, Julie Delpy, and Ethan Hawke	Won	
IndieWire Critics Poll	December 17, 2013	Best Ensemble	Before Midnight	3rd Place	
International Cinephile Society Awards	February 23, 2014	Best Picture	Before Midnight	11th Place	
International Cinephile Society Awards	February 23, 2014	Best Adapted Screenplay	Richard Linklater, Julie Delpy, and Ethan Hawke	Runner-up	
Los Angeles Film Critics Association Awards	December 8, 2013	Best Screenplay	Richard Linklater, Julie Delpy, and Ethan Hawke	Won	
National Society of Film Critics Awards	January 4, 2014	Best Actress	Julie Delpy	3rd Place	
National Society of Film Critics Awards	January 4, 2014	Best Screenplay	Richard Linklater, Julie Delpy, and Ethan Hawke	Won	
New York Film Critics Online Awards	December 8, 2013	Top Films of the Year	Before Midnight	Won	
Online Film Critics Society Awards	December 16, 2013	Best Picture	Before Midnight	Nominated	
Online Film Critics Society Awards	December 16, 2013	Best Actress	Julie Delpy	Nominated	
Online Film Critics Society Awards	December 16, 2013	Best Adapted Screenplay	Richard Linklater, Julie Delpy, and Ethan Hawke	Nominated	
Robert Awards	January 26, 2014	Best English Language Film	Before Midnight	Nominated	
San Diego Film Critics Society Awards	December 11, 2013	Best Adapted Screenplay	Richard Linklater, Julie Delpy, and Ethan Hawke	Won	
San Francisco Film Critics Circle Awards	December 13, 2013	Best Adapted Screenplay	Richard Linklater, Julie Delpy, and Ethan Hawke	Nominated	
Satellite Awards	February 23, 2014	Best Adapted Screenplay	Richard Linklater, Julie Delpy, and Ethan Hawke	Nominated	
Silver Condor Awards	August 11, 2014	Best Foreign Film	Before Midnight	Nominated	
South by Southwest Film Festival	March 9, 2013	Festival Favorites	Before Midnight	Nominated	
St. Louis Film Critics Association Awards	December 16, 2013	Best Adapted Screenplay	Richard Linklater, Julie Delpy, and Ethan Hawke	Nominated	
St. Louis Film Critics Association Awards	December 16, 2013	Best Art-House or Festival Film	Before Midnight	Nominated	
Toronto Film Critics Association Awards	December 17, 2013	Best Actress	Julie Delpy	Runner-up	
Toronto Film Critics Association Awards	December 17, 2013	Best Screenplay	Richard Linklater, Julie Delpy, and Ethan Hawke	Runner-up	
Turkish Film Critics Association Awards	January 20, 2014	Best Foreign Film	Before Midnight	6th Place	
Village Voice Film Poll	January 2, 2014	Best Film	Before Midnight	4th Place	
Village Voice Film Poll	January 2, 2014	Best Actress	Julie Delpy	5th Place	
Village Voice Film Poll	January 2, 2014	Best Screenplay	Richard Linklater, Julie Delpy, and Ethan Hawke	Won	
Washington D.C. Area Film Critics Association Awards	December 8, 2013	Best Adapted Screenplay	Richard Linklater, Julie Delpy, and Ethan Hawke	Nominated	
Women Film Critics Circle Awards	December 16, 2013	Best Woman Storyteller	Julie Delpy	Won	
Women Film Critics Circle Awards	December 16, 2013	Best Equality of the Sexes	Before Midnight	Won	
Women Film Critics Circle Awards	December 16, 2013	Best Screen Couple	Julie Delpy and Ethan Hawke	Won	
Writers Guild of America Awards	February 1, 2014	Best Adapted Screenplay	Richard Linklater, Julie Delpy, and Ethan Hawke	Nominated	
