= Before trilogy =

Romance trilogy by Richard Linklater

The Before Trilogy
- Criterion Collection cover art
- Directed by: Richard Linklater
- Screenplay by: Richard Linklater; Kim Krizan (Sunrise); Ethan Hawke (Sunset, Midnight); Julie Delpy (Sunset, Midnight)
- Story by: Richard Linklater (Sunset); Kim Krizan (Sunset)
- Produced by: Anne Walker-McBay (Sunrise, Sunset); Richard Linklater (Midnight); Christos V. Konstantakopoulos (Midnight); Sara Woodhatch (Midnight)
- Starring: Ethan Hawke; Julie Delpy
- Production companies: Castle Rock Entertainment; Detour Filmproduction; Filmhaus Films (Sunrise); Faliro House Productions (Midnight); Venture Forth (Midnight)
- Distributed by: Columbia Pictures (Sunrise); Warner Independent Pictures (Sunset); Sony Pictures Classics (Midnight)
- Running time: 290 minutes
- Countries: United States; Austria (Sunrise); Greece (Midnight)
- Language: English
- Budget: $7.5 million
- Box office: $61.5 million

The Before Trilogy consists of three romance films directed by Richard Linklater, and starring Ethan Hawke and Julie Delpy. Beginning with Before Sunrise (1995), and continuing with two sequels, Before Sunset (2004) and Before Midnight (2013). The films were all written by Linklater, along with Kim Krizan on the first film, and with Hawke and Delpy on the last two. (Note: Linklater and Krizan received story credit for their work on the sequel (Before Sunset).)

Set and filmed at nine-year intervals, the films chronicle the romantic relationship between Jesse (Hawke) and Céline (Delpy) at three periods of their lives. The characters also make cameo appearances in Linklater's animated anthology film Waking Life (2001). The first film was distributed by Columbia Pictures, (Note: Whilst Columbia Pictures distributed the first film in 1995, Warner Bros. currently holds the rights to the film, as they own the post-1994 Castle Rock library through Turner Entertainment.) while Warner Independent Pictures and Sony Pictures Classics distributed the second and third film, respectively. All films were produced by Castle Rock Entertainment, with Before Midnight also being produced by Venture Forth and Linklater's production company, Detour Filmproduction.

The films are considered minimal, consisting mostly of monologues and casual conversation with extended dialogue between the characters. Contrasting ideas and perspectives on life and love are detailed, with the series referencing time, self-discovery, age, loss, gender, and parentage; it is considered an exploration of postmodern romance. The trilogy received widespread critical acclaim. Among its numerous accolades, the series was nominated for two Academy Awards, two Writers Guild of America Awards, and the Golden Globe Award for Best Actress – Motion Picture Comedy or Musical for Delpy for Before Midnight. The trilogy grossed $61.5 million worldwide against a combined budget of $7.5 million.

== Films ==
Film	U.S. release date	Director	Screenwriter(s)	Story by	Producer(s)
Before Sunrise	January 27, 1995	Richard Linklater	Richard Linklater & Kim Krizan	Richard Linklater & Kim Krizan	Anne Walker-McBay
Before Sunset	July 2, 2004	Richard Linklater	Richard Linklater, Julie Delpy & Ethan Hawke	Richard Linklater & Kim Krizan	Anne Walker-McBay
Before Midnight	May 24, 2013	Richard Linklater	Richard Linklater, Julie Delpy & Ethan Hawke	Richard Linklater, Julie Delpy & Ethan Hawke	Richard Linklater, Christos V. Konstantakopoulos and Sara Woodhatch

=== Before Sunrise ===
Before Sunrise is set in a single night in Vienna as Jesse, an American student traveling through Europe, and Céline, a French student visiting relatives, meet on a Eurail train to Paris. They wander the streets of Vienna and fall in love, but they go their separate ways and agree to meet again in the future.

=== Before Sunset ===
Before Sunset takes place nine years after the first film, and is set in a single afternoon in Paris. Jesse, now a married father and a best-selling author, meets Céline while on tour promoting his latest book, which retells their meeting in Vienna. They wander Paris and lament on not following through with their plans to reunite. At the end of the film, Jesse goes to Céline's apartment, deciding to miss his flight home to stay with her.

=== Before Midnight ===
Before Midnight takes place nine years after the second film, and is set in a single day on the Peloponnese coast in Greece. Jesse and Céline, now a couple with twin daughters, argue over Jesse's desire to relocate to Chicago to be closer to his son, Hank, while Céline wishes to stay in Paris to take a job with the French government. Despite their relationship being tested, they eventually reconcile.

=== Potential fourth film ===
Linklater, Hawke, and Delpy have discussed continuing the series further, with changing levels of interest.

In March 2020, Hawke stated a sequel may likely not follow the precedent of a nine-year gap between films. "If the first three were all nine years apart, the fourth would not follow that trajectory," he said. "[Linklater] would want a different path but we enjoy working together and being together. We have to make sure we have something to say."

In June 2021, Delpy said that she had turned down going ahead with a sequel, later clarifying: "All three of us agreed that we couldn't come up with something good for a fourth one". She said that there was some discussion of the direction a fourth film might take, but, "it was basically an idea that none of us liked. That was the end of it. It was half of a bad idea that went around and we were like, ‘Let’s not do it.’"

== Production ==
=== Conception ===
Before Sunrise was inspired by a woman whom Richard Linklater met in a toy shop in Philadelphia in 1989. Due to the prevalence of dialogue, Linklater opted to collaborate on the screenplay with Kim Krizan, who previously appeared in his films Slacker (1990) and Dazed and Confused (1993). According to Linklater, "her mind [is] a constant stream of confident and intelligent ideas", as they talked about the film's concept and characters; only discussing an outline, the screenplay was written in 11 days. Linklater wished to explore the "relationships of life and discover two people [of] complete anonymity and try to find out who they really were". As a result, he decided on a foreign setting, deciding a person is "more open to experiences outside your realm".

=== Casting ===
Casting for the first film took nine months; originally against casting Ethan Hawke, considering him too young for the part, Linklater hired him after seeing him at a play in New York City. After hiring Julie Delpy, Linklater asked them to read together in Austin, Texas, then deciding they were right for the roles. In 2016, Delpy told Creative Screenwriting she and Hawke performed uncredited rewrites, stating "the original screenplay [lacked] romance. It was a lot of talking [and] Richard hired us to bring the romance to the film". Despite not being credited, Delpy claimed that a credit from a relatively unknown actress may have prevented the film from gaining finance. Delpy and Hawke subsequently received writing credit for the sequels.

=== Sequel ===
Linklater considered a larger budget sequel, to be filmed in four locations. His proposal did not secure funding, so he scaled back the concept of the film, with Hawke, Linklater, and Delpy working independently on their own screenplays over the years. They also adapted elements of the earlier scripts for Before Sunrise for the sequel.

Linklater described the process of completing the final version of the film as:

We sat in a room and worked together in about a two- or three-day period, worked out a very detailed outline of the whole film in this sort of real-time environment. And then, over the next year or so, we just started e-mailing each other and faxing. I was sort of a conduit – they would send me monologues and dialogues and scenes and ideas, and I was editing, compiling and writing. And that's how we came up with a script.

Hawke said, "It's not like anybody was begging us to make a second film. We obviously did it because we wanted to."

It filmed entirely on location in Paris. It opens inside the Shakespeare and Company bookstore on the Left Bank. Other locations include their walking through the Marais district of the 4th arrondissement, Le Pure Café in the 11th arrondissement, the Promenade Plantée park in the 12th arrondissement, on board a bateau mouche from Quai de la Tournelle to Quai Henri IV, the interior of a taxi, and finally "Céline's apartment." Described in the film as located at 10 rue des Petites-Écuries, it was filmed in Cour de l'Étoile d'Or off rue du Faubourg St-Antoine.

Filming took 15 days, on a budget of about US$2 million. The film is noted for its use of the Steadicam for tracking shots and its use of long takes; the longest of the Steadicam takes lasts about 11 minutes. As the summer was one of the hottest on record, the cast and crew suffered along with the city residents, as temperatures exceeded 100 degrees F (38 °C) for most of the production.

The film is notable for essentially taking place in real time, i.e. the time elapsed in the story is the run time of the film. In the fast-changing temperate Paris climate, this created challenges for the cinematographer Lee Daniel to match the color and intensity of the skies and ambient light from scene to scene. The scenes were mostly shot in sequence, as they were still developing the screenplay. Producer Anne Walker-McBay worked with less time and less money than she had on Before Sunrise, but still brought the film in on time and on budget. The sequel was released nine years after Before Sunrise, the same amount of time that has lapsed in the plot since the events of the first film.

The film was released in the wake of Hawke's divorce from Uma Thurman. Some commentators drew parallels between Hawke's personal life and the character of Jesse in the film. Additional comment has noted that both Hawke and Delpy incorporated elements of their own lives into the screenplay. Delpy wrote two of the songs featured in the film, and a third by her was included in the closing credits and film soundtrack.

=== Third film ===
In the subsequent years, Linklater, Hawke, and Delpy had all discussed doing a sequel to Before Sunset (or the third in a trilogy). In November 2011, Hawke said that he, Delpy and Linklater "have been talking a lot in the last six months. All three of us have been having similar feelings, that we're kind of ready to revisit those characters. There's nine years between the first two films and, if we made the film next summer, it would be nine years again, so we started thinking that would be a good thing to do. So we're going to try and write it this year."

In June 2012, Hawke confirmed that the sequel to Before Sunset would be filmed that summer. Soon after, Delpy denied filming would take place that year. But by August 2012, numerous reports emerged from Messenia, Greece, that the film was being shot there. The completion of filming the sequel, titled Before Midnight, was announced on September 5, 2012. Linklater said that, after ten weeks of writing and rehearsing, the film was made in fifteen days for less than $3 million. It premiered at the 2013 Sundance Film Festival in January 2013.

=== Summary table ===
Film	Crew/Detail					
Film	Composer(s)	Cinematographer	Editor	Production companies	Distributing companies	Running time
Before Sunrise	Fred Frith	Lee Daniel	Sandra Adair	Castle Rock Entertainment, Detour Filmproduction	Columbia Pictures	1 hr 41 mins
Before Sunset	Julie Delpy & Glover Gill	Lee Daniel	Sandra Adair	Castle Rock Entertainment, Detour Filmproduction	Warner Independent Pictures	1 hr 20 mins
Before Midnight	Graham Reynolds	Christos Voudouris	Sandra Adair	Castle Rock Entertainment, Detour Filmproduction, Venture Forth Productions, Faliro House Productions	Sony Pictures Classics	1 hr 49 mins

== Reception ==
=== Box office ===
Film	Release date	Budget	Box office gross
Before Sunrise	January 19, 1995	$2.5 million	$22.5 million
Before Sunset	February 10, 2004	$2 million	$15.8 million
Before Midnight	January 20, 2013	$3 million	$23.2 million

=== Critical response ===
Film	Rotten Tomatoes	Metacritic
Before Sunrise	100% (51 reviews)	79 (19 reviews)
Before Sunset	94% (181 reviews)	91 (39 reviews)
Before Midnight	98% (202 reviews)	94 (41 reviews)

Before Sunrise received high critical praise at the time of its release. The review aggregation website Rotten Tomatoes reported that 100% of critics have given the film a positive review based on 51 reviews, with an average rating of 8.4/10. The site's critics consensus reads, "Thought-provoking and beautifully filmed, Before Sunrise is an intelligent, unabashedly romantic look at modern love, led by marvelously natural performances from Ethan Hawke and Julie Delpy." On Metacritic, the film has a weighted average score of 79 out of 100 based on 19 critics, indicating "generally favorable reviews".

Film critic Roger Ebert gave Before Sunrise three out of four stars and described Julie Delpy as "ravishingly beautiful and, more important, warm and matter-of-fact, speaking English so well the screenplay has to explain it (she spent some time in the States)". In her review for The New York Times, Janet Maslin wrote, "Before Sunrise is as uneven as any marathon conversation might be, combining colorful, disarming insights with periodic lulls. The film maker clearly wants things this way, with both these young characters trying on ideas and attitudes as if they were new clothes". Hal Hinson, in his review for The Washington Post wrote, "Before Sunrise is not a big movie, or one with big ideas, but it is a cut above the banal twentysomething love stories you usually see at the movies. This one, at least, treats young people as real people".

Before Sunset received widespread acclaim from critics. On Rotten Tomatoes it holds an approval rating of 94% based on 181 reviews, with an average rating of 8.3/10. The site's critics consensus reads, "Filled with engaging dialogue, Before Sunset is a witty, poignant romance, with natural chemistry between Hawke and Delpy." On Metacritic, the film has a weighted average score of 91 out of 100 based on 39 reviews from mainstream publications, indicating "universal acclaim". The film appeared on 28 critics' top 10 lists of the best films of 2004, and took the 27th spot on Metacritic's list of The Best-Reviewed Movies of the Decade (2000–09).

In comparing this film to the first, American film critic Roger Ebert wrote, "Before Sunrise was a remarkable celebration of the fascination of good dialogue. But Before Sunset is better, perhaps because the characters are older and wiser, perhaps because they have more to lose (or win), and perhaps because Hawke and Delpy wrote the dialogue themselves." In her review for the Los Angeles Times, Manohla Dargis lauded the film as a "deeper, truer work of art than the first," and praised director Linklater for making a film that "keeps faith with American cinema at its finest."

Before Midnight also received widespread critical acclaim. Rotten Tomatoes gives the film a score of 98% based on reviews from 202 critics, with an average rating of 8.7/10. The site's consensus is: "Building on the first two installments in Richard Linklater's well-crafted Before trilogy, Before Midnight offers intelligent, powerfully acted perspectives on love, marriage, and long-term commitment." Metacritic gives the film a score of 94 out of 100, based on reviews from 41 critics, indicating "universal acclaim". It was listed as the third-best film of the year after 12 Years a Slave and Gravity. According to Rotten Tomatoes, it was the second-best reviewed film of 2013 after Alfonso Cuarón's Gravity.

According to Total Film's Philip Kemp, "As with its two predecessors — and with the films of French New Wave director Éric Rohmer, presiding deity of this kind of cinema—Midnight's essentially a film about people talking. But when the talk's this good, this absorbing and revealing and witty and true, who's going to complain?... [It's a] more-than-worthy, expectation-exceeding chapter in one of modern cinema's finest love stories. As honest, convincing, funny, intimate and natural as its predecessors."

Perry Seibert of AllMovie also praised the film, writing: "The screenwriting trio fill the movie with long, discursive conversations (there are only two scenes in the first 20 minutes) that feel utterly improvised when they are performed, but are far too deftly structured to be anything other than the work of consummate artists." Eric Kohn, from Indiewire, gave the film a rave review, adding it to his list of Top 10 Films of 2013. He wrote that "With Before Midnight, Richard Linklater has completed one of the finest movie trilogies of all time." In 2021, The Independent ranked the Before Trilogy third on its list of "10 greatest movie trilogies of all time".

=== Accolades ===
The trilogy received numerous accolades. Linklater won the Silver Bear for Best Director at the 1995 Berlin International Film Festival for Before Sunrise. In 2025, the film was selected by the National Film Preservation Board for preservation in the United States Library of Congress's National Film Registry as being "culturally, historically, or aesthetically significant". Before Sunset and Before Midnight were both nominated for the Bodil Award for Best English Language Film, the Gotham Independent Film Award for Best Feature, the Online Film Critics Society Award for Best Picture, and the Silver Condor Award for Best Foreign Film. Their screenplays received nominations at the Academy Awards, the Film Independent Spirit Awards, the Online Film Critics Society Awards, and the Writers Guild of America Awards. Delpy was also nominated for the Golden Globe Award for Best Actress in a Motion Picture – Musical or Comedy for Before Midnight.
