= The Noise Revival Orchestra =

- Origin: Austin, Texas, USA
- Genres: Indie rock, orchestral pop, art rock
- Years active: 2004–present
- Labels: Indierect
- Members: Nathan Felix; Ben Humphries; Vince Pierce; Josh Brown; Daniela Nunez; Josh Frank; Jeffrey Elliott; Heather Coleman; Jessica June Kim
- Past members: Kim Charlotte; Alexa Skilicorn; Amber Nepodal; Stephen Felix; Aaron Calhoun; Gary Delgado; Allie Attal; Candice Jackson; Zach Buie; Jerry Carroll; Agnes Savich; Adam Owens; Eddie Reyna
- Website: http://www.thenoiserevival.com/ (defunct)

The Noise Revival Orchestra is an orchestral indie collective based in Austin, Texas. Formed in 2004 as a 4-piece by Nathan Felix, The Noise Revival Orchestra has grown to a 13- to 17-piece orchestra.

In 2008, the band was featured on mtvU Ahead of the Curve. In 2009, The Noise Revival's "Days n Daze" was used in the public service announcement video for Institute for Democratic Education in America.

In May 2010, Nathan Felix traveled to Denmark with The House of Songs to participate in a three-day intensive songwriting collaboration and to perform at SPOT and Inter SPOT as part of The Austin Five. The Noise Revival Orchestra released Songs of Forgiveness in the spring of 2011 and subsequently toured Denmark, Iceland, and the Faroe Islands to support it.

In 2014, The Noise Revival Orchestra toured Taiwan and Japan, highlighted by festival dates where they performed for crowds of 35,000 and 50,000 at the Taichung Jazz Festival.

Felix wrote the score for the 2015 Andrew Shapter film The Teller and the Truth. His 2nd symphony, Neon Heaven, premiered at SPOT Festival in 2015.

== Releases ==
- To the Seven Churches in the Province of Asia (2004)
- Live Tour EP (2005)
- TNROEP (2007)
- Farilya EP (2009)
- BMBT (2010)
- Songs of Forgiveness (2011)
