= List of screenwriting awards for film =

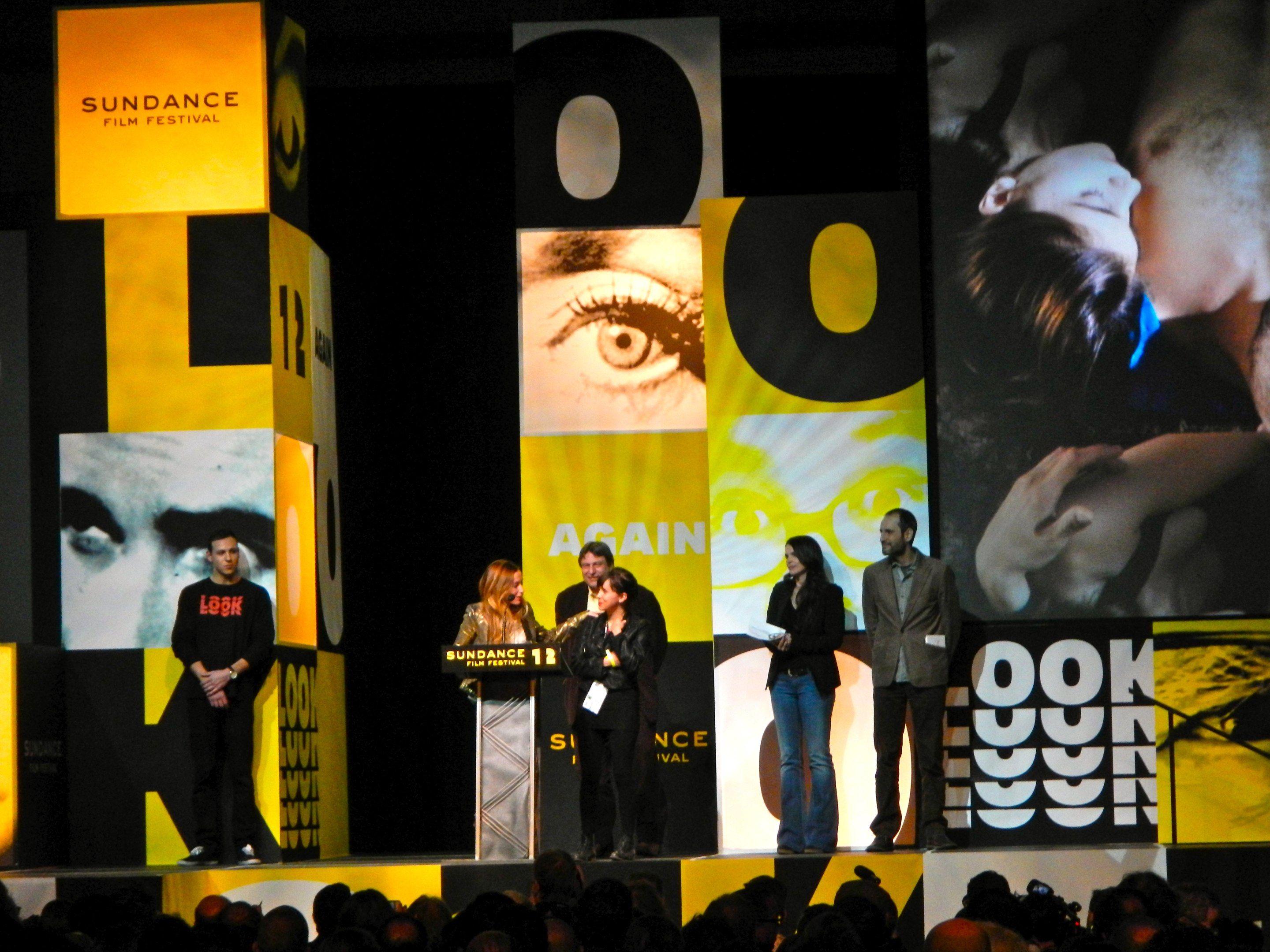
World Cinema Screenwriting Award 2012, Sundance Awards Ceremony

This list of screenwriting awards for film is an index to articles on notable awards given for film screenwriting. The list is organized by region and country of the awards venue or sponsor, but winners are not necessarily restricted to people from that country.

== Americas ==
Country	Award	Venue / sponsor	Notes
Canada	Canadian Screen Award for Best Screenplay	Academy of Canadian Cinema & Television	Part of the Canadian Screen Awards
Canada	WGC Screenwriting Awards	Writers Guild of Canada	
United States	Academy Award for Best Story	Academy of Motion Picture Arts and Sciences	given from the beginning of the Academy Awards in 1929 until 1956
United States	Academy Award for Best Adapted Screenplay	Academy of Motion Picture Arts and Sciences	
United States	Academy Award for Best Original Screenplay	Academy of Motion Picture Arts and Sciences	
United States	Alliance of Women Film Journalists Award for Best Woman Screenwriter	Alliance of Women Film Journalists	
United States	Boston Society of Film Critics Award for Best Screenplay	Boston Society of Film Critics	The Society does not distinguish between original screenplays and adaptation for their Best Screenplay award.
United States	Chicago Film Critics Association Award for Best Adapted Screenplay	Chicago Film Critics Association	
United States	Chicago Film Critics Association Award for Best Original Screenplay	Chicago Film Critics Association	
United States	Chicago Film Critics Association Award for Best Screenplay	Chicago Film Critics Association	
United States	Critics' Choice Movie Award for Best Screenplay	Broadcast Film Critics Association	
United States	Dallas–Fort Worth Film Critics Association Award for Best Screenplay	Dallas–Fort Worth Film Critics Association	
United States	Florida Film Critics Circle Award for Best Screenplay	Florida Film Critics Circle	
United States	Golden Globe Award for Best Screenplay	Hollywood Foreign Press Association	
United States	Gotham Independent Film Award for Best Screenplay	Gotham Awards	
United States	Hollywood Screenwriter Award	Hollywood Film Festival	
United States	Houston Film Critics Society Award for Best Screenplay	Houston Film Critics Society	
United States	Humanitas Prize	Humanitas	To promote human dignity, meaning, and freedom
United States	Independent Spirit Award for Best Screenplay	Independent Spirit Awards	
United States	Los Angeles Film Critics Association Award for Best Screenplay	Los Angeles Film Critics Association	
United States	National Board of Review Award for Best Adapted Screenplay	National Board of Review	
United States	National Board of Review Award for Best Original Screenplay	National Board of Review	
United States	National Society of Film Critics Award for Best Screenplay	National Society of Film Critics	
United States	New York Film Critics Circle Award for Best Screenplay	New York Film Critics Circle	
United States	Online Film Critics Society Award for Best Adapted Screenplay	Online Film Critics Society	
United States	Online Film Critics Society Award for Best Original Screenplay	Online Film Critics Society	
United States	San Diego Film Critics Society Award for Best Adapted Screenplay	San Diego Film Critics Society	
United States	San Diego Film Critics Society Award for Best Original Screenplay	San Diego Film Critics Society	
United States	San Francisco Bay Area Film Critics Circle Award for Best Adapted Screenplay	San Francisco Bay Area Film Critics Circle	
United States	San Francisco Bay Area Film Critics Circle Award for Best Original Screenplay	San Francisco Bay Area Film Critics Circle	
United States	Satellite Award for Best Adapted Screenplay	International Press Academy	
United States	Satellite Award for Best Original Screenplay	International Press Academy	
United States	St. Louis Film Critics Association Award for Best Adapted Screenplay	St. Louis Film Critics Association	
United States	St. Louis Film Critics Association Award for Best Original Screenplay	St. Louis Film Critics Association	
United States	USC Scripter Award	University of Southern California	
United States	Washington D.C. Area Film Critics Association Award for Best Adapted Screenplay	Washington D.C. Area Film Critics Association	
United States	Washington D.C. Area Film Critics Association Award for Best Original Screenplay	Washington D.C. Area Film Critics Association	
United States	Writers Guild of America Award for Best Adapted Screenplay	Writers Guild of America	
United States	Writers Guild of America Award for Best Original Screenplay	Writers Guild of America	

== Asia ==
Country	Award	Venue / sponsor	Notes
China	Golden Rooster Award for Best Writing	Golden Rooster Awards	
China	Huabiao Award for Outstanding Writer	Huabiao Awards	
India	Filmfare Award for Best Screenplay	Filmfare magazine	Hindi
India	Nandi Award for Best Screenplay Writer	Nandi Awards	Telugu
India	Santosham Best Screenplay Award	Santosham Film Awards	Telugu
India	Karnataka State Film Award for Best Dialogue	Government of Karnataka	
India	Nandi Award for Best Dialogue Writer	Nandi Awards	Telugu
India	National Film Award for Best Screenplay	National Film Awards	
India	Nandi Award for Best Story Writer	Nandi Awards	Telugu
Iran	Crystal Simorgh for Best Screenplay	Fajr International Film Festival	
Japan	Blue Ribbon Awards for Best Screenplay	Blue Ribbon Awards	
Japan	Mainichi Film Award for Best Screenplay	Mainichi Film Awards	.
Macau	Golden Lotus Award for Best Writing	Macau International Movie Festival	
South Korea	Baeksang Arts Awards for Best Screenplay (Film)	Baeksang Arts Awards	

== Europe ==
Country	Award	Venue / sponsor	Notes
Belgium	Magritte Award for Best Screenplay	Académie André Delvaux	One of the Magritte Awards
Croatia	Golden Arena for Best Screenplay	Pula Film Festival	
Czech Republic	Czech Lion Award for Best Screenplay	Czech Lion Awards	
France	Cannes Film Festival Award for Best Screenplay	Cannes Film Festival	
France	César Award for Best Adaptation	Académie des Arts et Techniques du Cinéma	
France	César Award for Best Original Screenplay	Académie des Arts et Techniques du Cinéma	
France	César Award for Best Original Screenplay or Adaptation	Académie des Arts et Techniques du Cinéma	
France	Lumière Award for Best Screenplay	Académie des Lumières	
France	Prix Jacques Prévert du Scénario	French Screenwriters Guild	
Germany	Bavarian Film Awards (Best Screenplay)	Bavarian Film Awards	
Germany	Silver Bear for Best Screenplay	Berlin International Film Festival	
Italy	David di Donatello for Best Screenplay	Accademia del Cinema Italiano	
Italy	Nastro d'Argento for Best Screenplay	Sindacato Nazionale dei Giornalisti Cinematografici Italiani	
Netherlands	Golden Calf for Best Script	Netherlands Film Festival	
Spain	Goya Award for Best Adapted Screenplay	Goya Awards	
Spain	Goya Award for Best Original Screenplay	Goya Awards	
Sweden	Guldbagge Award for Best Screenplay	Swedish Film Institute	
United Kingdom	London Film Critics' Circle Award for Screenwriter of the Year	London Film Critics' Circle	

== Oceania ==
Country	Award	Venue / sponsor	Notes
Australia	AACTA Award for Best Adapted Screenplay	Australian Academy of Cinema and Television Arts	
Australia	AACTA Award for Best Original Screenplay	Australian Academy of Cinema and Television Arts	
Australia	AACTA International Award for Best Screenplay	Australian Academy of Cinema and Television Arts	
Australia	Asia Pacific Screen Award for Best Screenplay	Asia Pacific Screen Awards	
Australia	Australian Film Institute Award for Best Screenplay	Australian Film Institute	

== See also ==
- Screenwriting
- Lists of awards
- List of film awards
- List of writing awards
