= Joel Rasmussen =

Joel Rasmussen (born September 14, 1970) is a Montana born filmmaker, author, and producer. He produced and co-wrote Before the Music Dies, a 2006 documentary, narrated by Forest Whitaker that examines the homogenization of the music industry. Rasmussen and the film's director, Andrew Shapter spent a year traveling across the U.S. interviewing hundreds of people in the music business. The film features interviews and performances from such musicians and groups as Doyle Bramhall II, Erykah Badu, Eric Clapton, Dave Matthews, Branford Marsalis, Elvis Costello, and Bonnie Raitt He is the CEO and Co-founder of Fantrail.

== Early years ==
Rasmussen attended Lewis and Clark College and graduated from the University of Montana in 2003 with a degree in Music Technology.

== Personal life ==
Rasmussen lives in Austin, Texas with his wife Dani and son Leif.
