= Before Midnight =

2013 American romantic drama film directed by Richard Linklater

- Theatrical release poster
- Directed by: Richard Linklater
- Written by: Richard Linklater; Ethan Hawke; Julie Delpy
- Based on: Characters by Richard Linklater and Kim Krizan
- Produced by: Richard Linklater; Christos V. Konstantakopoulos; Sara Woodhatch
- Starring: Ethan Hawke; Julie Delpy
- Cinematography: Christos Voudouris
- Edited by: Sandra Adair
- Music by: Graham Reynolds
- Production companies: Castle Rock Entertainment; Faliro House Productions; Venture Forth; Detour Filmproduction
- Distributed by: Sony Pictures Classics
- Release dates: January 20, 2013 (Sundance); May 24, 2013 (United States)
- Running time: 109 minutes
- Countries: United States; Greece
- Language: English
- Budget: $3 million
- Box office: $23.3 million

Before Midnight is a 2013 romantic drama film directed by Richard Linklater, who co-wrote the screenplay with Ethan Hawke and Julie Delpy. The sequel to Before Sunrise (1995) and Before Sunset (2004), it is the third and final installment in the Before trilogy. The film follows Jesse (Hawke) and Céline (Delpy), now a couple, as they spend a summer vacation in Greece with their children.

Linklater, Hawke, and Delpy began developing a third film in 2011, wishing to replicate the nine-year gap between the first two installments. Principal photography began in August 2012, and took place entirely on the Peloponnese coast in Southern Greece, including the Kardamyli home formerly owned by author Patrick Leigh Fermor. Like its predecessors, Before Midnight has a minimal plot, with considerable screentime devoted to extended conversations between the characters.

Before Midnight premiered at the Sundance Film Festival on January 20, 2013. It began a domestic limited release on May 24, and went on general release on June 14 by Sony Pictures Classics. It grossed $23 million worldwide, becoming the highest-grossing film in the trilogy. It received widespread critical acclaim, particularly for its exploration of romance and age, its screenplay, Linklater's direction, and acting performances. The film garnered numerous accolades and was nominated for the Academy Award for Best Adapted Screenplay, the Writers Guild of America Award for Best Adapted Screenplay, and the Golden Globe Award for Best Actress – Motion Picture Comedy or Musical for Delpy.

== Plot ==
Nine years after reuniting in Paris, (Note: As depicted in Before Sunset (2004)) Jesse and Céline are now in a relationship and have twin daughters. Jesse reflects on his inability to maintain his relationship with his son Hank, now a teenager. After vacationing with the couple and the girls on the Greek Peloponnese peninsula, Hank flies home to Chicago where he lives with his mother, Jesse's ex-wife.

Jesse is a successful novelist. However, Céline is at a career crossroads. After her NGO's wind farm gets rejected at the last minute, frustrated, she is considering a job with the French government, although it would mean again working for someone she dislikes intensely. As they drive, the couple discusses their 'bad parenting'. Not only do they not stop to see a ruin one of the girls wanted to see, but Jesse sneakily finishes off an apple they had been eating while she sleeps. Discussing Hank, he laments missing his formative years, and Céline confesses he had confided in her about having his first kiss on this vacation. Céline announces that the disagreement over Hank marks the beginning of the end, but Jesse vehemently disagrees.

Later, they reflect on love and life over dinner with the friends who had invited them there. A lot of what they discuss is the inherent difference between the sexes' perspectives. As their friends pay for a hotel room for the couple, Jesse and Céline chat on their walk there. They reflect on their views from when they were young and now. Then, about their initial meetings, and wonder if they would have become a couple if they met as they are now. Jesse reveals his dad just contacted him to join their family in Texas, as his close to centenarian grandmother died. The ashes of his grandfather who died a year ago will be mixed with hers, as they had been together over seventy years. The two then discuss if they would be able to stay together for over seventy years.

Upon reaching the hotel, one of the receptionists asks them to autograph copies of Jesse's first two books. Finally, as they begin to get intimate, they are interrupted by a phone call from Hank, who seems to have bonded with Céline more than Jesse. Céline blames his ex-wife for taking her anger towards them out on the boy. They eventually have a fierce argument, expressing fears about the strength of their relationship. Jesse wants them to consider moving to Chicago so he can be closer to Hank, which Céline is opposed to unless they can share custody, and thinks will cost her any chance of a career outside her family. During the argument, they accuse each other of having affairs and Céline leaves and returns twice. Then she tells Jesse she thinks she no longer loves him.

Céline leaves their room the third time and sits alone in the hotel's outdoor restaurant. Jesse joins her and pretends that he is a time traveler like he did during their first meeting, (Note: As depicted in Before Sunrise (1995)) bringing her a letter from her 82-year-old self, describing this night as one of the best of their lives. Initially unamused, Céline says their fantasies will never match the imperfect reality. Jesse says while their love may be imperfect, it is real. After a moment, Céline joins in Jesse's role play, and they reconcile.

== Cast ==
- Ethan Hawke as Jesse
- Julie Delpy as Céline
- Seamus Davey-Fitzpatrick as Hank
- Jennifer Prior as Ella
- Charlotte Prior as Nina
- Xenia Kalogeropoulou as Natalia
- Walter Lassally as Patrick
- Ariane Labed as Anna
- Yiannis Papadopoulos as Achilleas
- Athina Rachel Tsangari as Ariadni
- Panos Koronis as Stefanos

== Production ==
Richard Linklater, Ethan Hawke, and Julie Delpy had all discussed doing a sequel to Before Sunset. In November 2011, Hawke said that he, Delpy and Linklater

have been talking a lot in the last six months. All three of us have been having similar feelings, that we're kind of ready to revisit those characters. There's nine years between the first two movies and, if we made the film next summer, it would be nine years again, so we started thinking that would be a good thing to do. So we're going to try and write it this year.

In June 2012, Hawke confirmed that the sequel would be filmed that summer. Soon after, Delpy denied filming would take place that year. By that August, numerous reports emerged from Messenia, Greece, that the film was being shot there. The completion of the sequel, Before Midnight, was announced on September 5, 2012. Linklater said that, after ten weeks of writing and rehearsing, the film was made in 15 days for less than $3 million. He announced plans to premiere the film at a festival in early 2013.

== Release ==
Before Midnight premiered on January 20, 2013, at the 2013 Sundance Film Festival. It had its international premiere out of competition at the 63rd Berlin International Film Festival.

The film opened to general audiences on May 24, 2013, at five theaters in New York, Los Angeles, and Austin, Texas. It was released wide in 897 theaters on June 14, 2013.

=== Box office ===
The film grossed $8,110,621 domestically and $15,141,309 internationally, for a worldwide gross of $23,251,930.

=== Critical reception ===
Like the previous entry in the trilogy, Before Midnight received widespread critical acclaim. Rotten Tomatoes gives the film an approval rating of 98% based on 202 reviews, with an average rating of 8.7/10. The site's critics consensus reads: "Building on the first two installments in Richard Linklater's well-crafted Before trilogy, Before Midnight offers intelligent, powerfully acted perspectives on love, marriage, and long-term commitment." Metacritic gives the film a weighted average score of 94 out of 100, based on 41 critics, indicating "universal acclaim". It was listed as the third-best film of the year after 12 Years a Slave and Gravity. It was the second-best reviewed film of 2013 according to Rotten Tomatoes, after Alfonso Cuarón's Gravity.

According to Total Film's Philip Kemp, "As with its two predecessors—and with the films of French New Wave director Éric Rohmer, presiding deity of this kind of cinema—Midnight's essentially a film about people talking. But when the talk's this good, this absorbing and revealing and witty and true, who's going to complain?... [It's a] more-than-worthy, expectation-exceeding chapter in one of modern cinema's finest love stories. As honest, convincing, funny, intimate and natural as its predecessors."

Perry Seibert of AllMovie also praised the film, writing: "The screenwriting trio fill the movie with long, discursive conversations (there are only two scenes in the first 20 minutes) that feel utterly improvised when they are performed, but are far too deftly structured to be anything other than the work of consummate artists." Eric Kohn, in Indiewire, gave the film a rave review, adding it to his list of Top 10 Films of 2013 and writing, "With Before Midnight, Richard Linklater has completed one of the finest movie trilogies of all time." Peter Bradshaw of The Guardian called the film "intimate and intelligent".

== Accolades ==
Linklater, Delpy, and Hawke won the AARP Movies for Grownups Award for Best Screenwriter, the Hollywood Screenwriter Award, and the National Society of Film Critics Award for Best Screenplay. The film won three Women Film Critics Circle Awards and was nominated for the Bodil Award for Best English Language Film, the Gotham Independent Film Award for Best Feature, the Robert Award for Best English Language Film, and the Silver Condor Award for Best Foreign Film. The screenplay also received nominations at the Academy Awards, the Critics' Choice Awards, the Film Independent Spirit Awards, and the Writers Guild of America Awards. Delpy was additionally nominated for the Alliance of Women Film Journalists Award for Best Woman Screenwriter and the Golden Globe Award for Best Actress in a Motion Picture – Musical or Comedy.

=== Top ten lists ===
According to Metacritic, the film appeared on the following critics' top 10 lists of 2013.

- 1st – James Berardinelli, ReelViews
- 1st – The A.V. Club
- 1st – Chris Nashawaty, Entertainment Weekly
- 1st – Stephen Holden, The New York Times
- 1st – Justin Chang, Variety
- 2nd – A.A. Dowd, The A.V. Club
- 2nd – Nick Schager, The A.V. Club
- 2nd – Total Film's 50 Best Movies of 2013
- 2nd – E!
- 3rd – Lisa Schwarzbaum, BBC
- 3rd – 3 News
- 3rd – Owen Gleiberman, Entertainment Weekly
- 3rd – Eric Kohn, Indiewire
- 3rd – Film Comment's 50 Best Films of 2013
- 4th – Christopher Rosen & Mike Ryan, The Huffington Post
- 4th – Peter Travers, Rolling Stone
- 4th – Kristopher Tapleys, HitFix
- 5th – Robert Gifford, The Diamondback
- 6th – Sam Adams, The A.V. Club
- 6th – Marlow Stern, The Daily Beast
- 6th - Lukas Krycek, Comedian/Film Critic
- 7th – Stephanie Zacharek, The Village Voice
- 7th – Digital Spy
- 8th – Empire
- 8th – Scott MacDonald, The A.V. Club
- 8th – Chris Vognar, The Dallas Morning News
- 11th – Ben Kenigsberg, The A.V. Club
- 12th – Glenn Kenny's 30 Top Films of 2013
- 14th – Ignatiy Vishnevetsky, The A.V. Club
- In alphabetical order – Manohla Dargis, The New York Times
- In alphabetical order – Dana Stevens, Slate
- Best films of 2013 – Peter Bradshaw, The Guardian
- Best movies of the year – David Denby, The New Yorker
- Best movies of 2013 – The Week

The A.V. Club film critics named "The fight" scene the Scene of the Year.
