= 2013 National Society of Film Critics Awards =

Annual US film awards ceremony

The 48th National Society of Film Critics Awards, given on 4 January 2014, honored the best in film for 2013.

48th NSFC Awards

January 4, 2014

Best Film:
Inside Llewyn Davis

== Winners ==
Film titles are listed in order of placings:

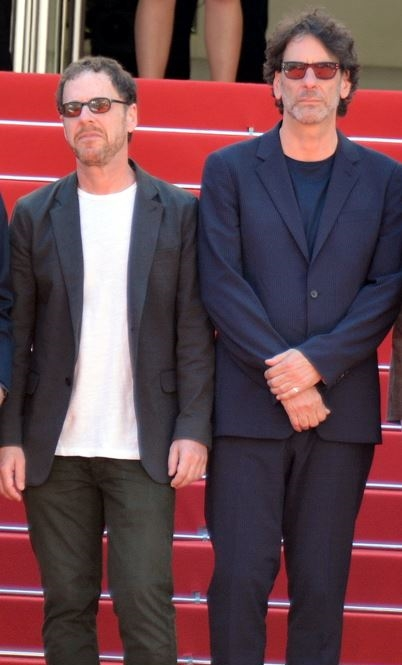
Coen brothers, Best Director winners

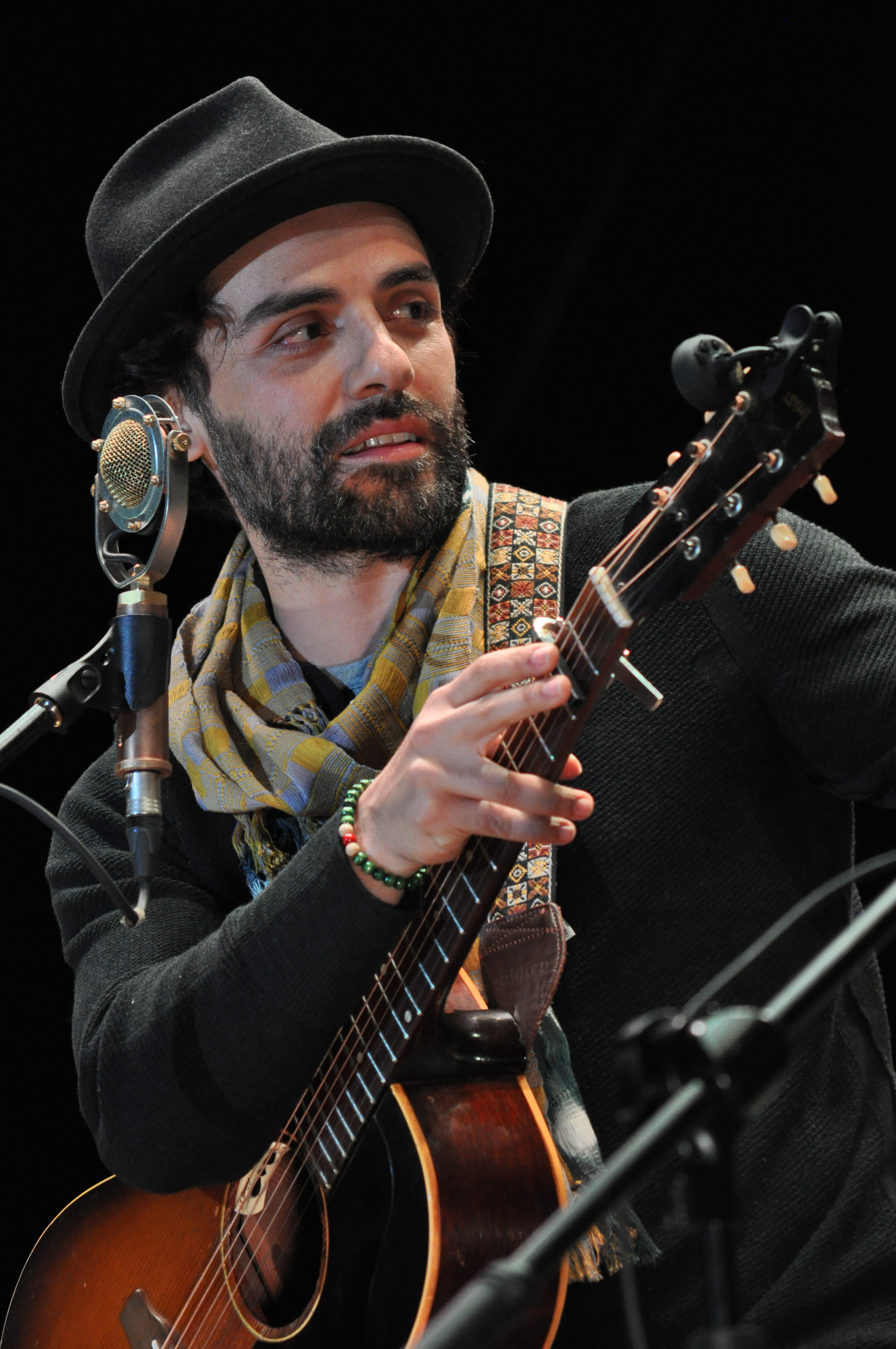
Oscar Isaac, Best Actor winner

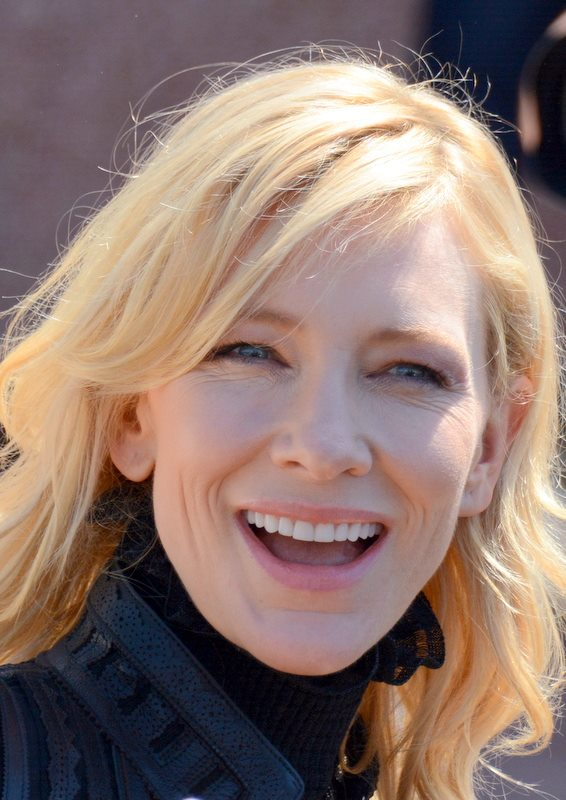
Cate Blanchett, Best Actress winner

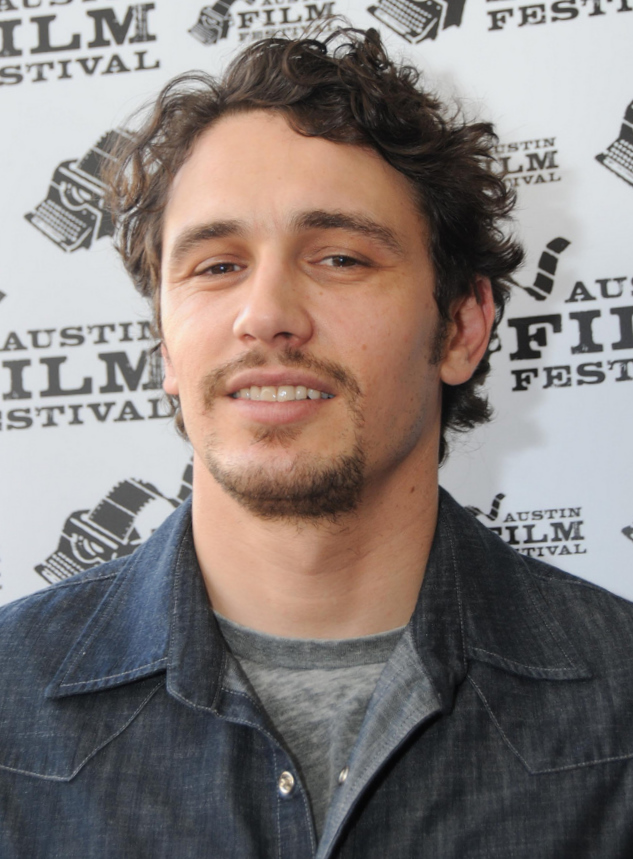
James Franco, Best Supporting Actor

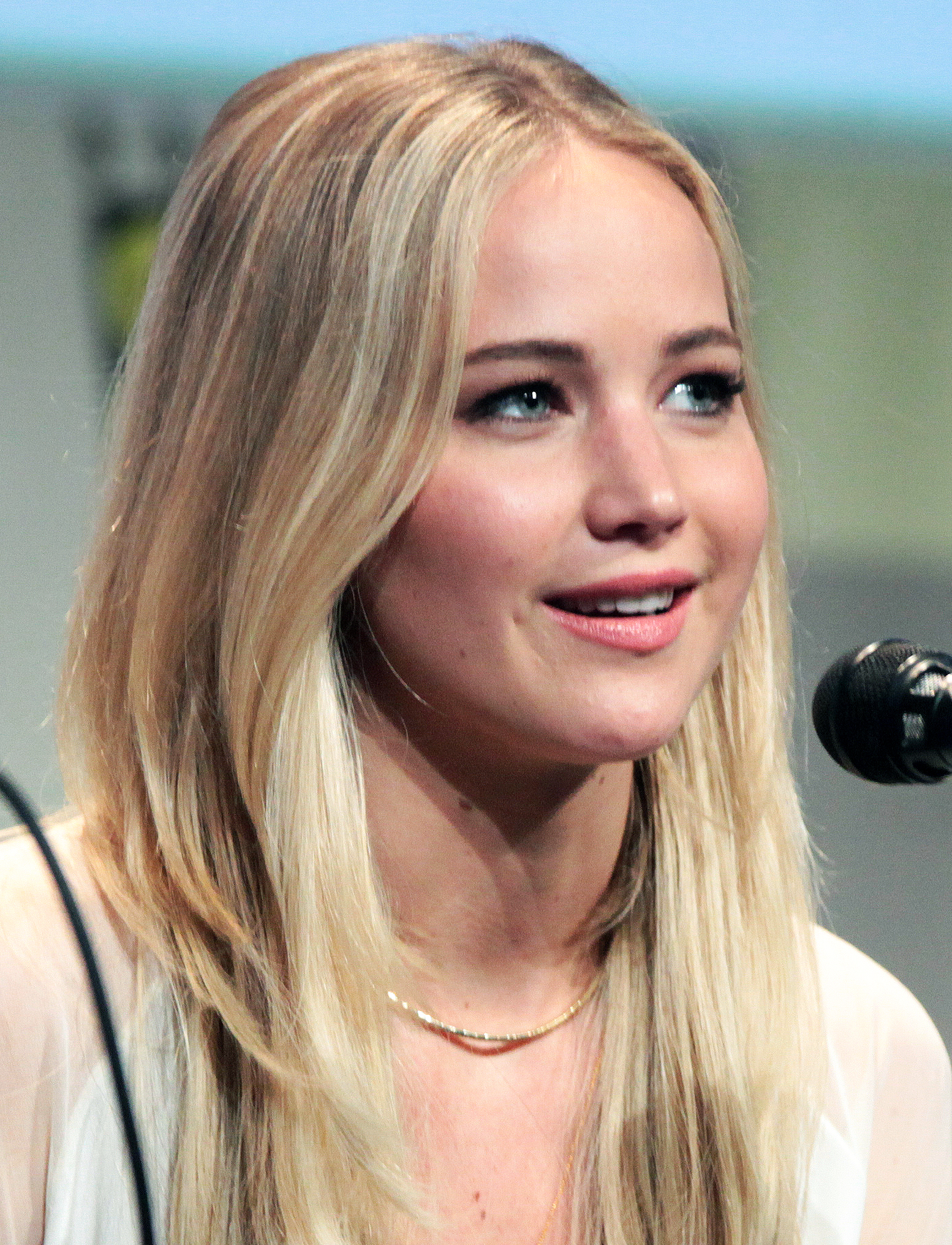
Jennifer Lawrence, Best Supporting Actress winner

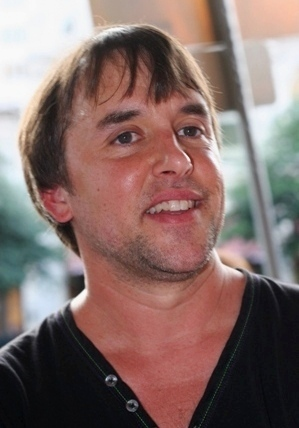
Richard Linklater, Best Screenplay co-winner

=== Best Picture ===
1. Inside Llewyn Davis
2. American Hustle
3. 12 Years a Slave
3. Her

=== Best Director ===
1. Joel Coen and Ethan Coen – Inside Llewyn Davis
2. Alfonso Cuarón – Gravity
3. Steve McQueen – 12 Years a Slave

=== Best Actor ===
1. Oscar Isaac – Inside Llewyn Davis
2. Chiwetel Ejiofor – 12 Years a Slave
3. Robert Redford – All Is Lost

=== Best Actress ===
1. Cate Blanchett – Blue Jasmine
2. Adèle Exarchopoulos – Blue Is the Warmest Colour
3. Julie Delpy – Before Midnight

=== Best Supporting Actor ===
1. James Franco – Spring Breakers
2. Jared Leto – Dallas Buyers Club
3. Barkhad Abdi – Captain Phillips

=== Best Supporting Actress ===
1. Jennifer Lawrence – American Hustle
2. Lupita Nyong'o – 12 Years a Slave
3. Léa Seydoux – Blue Is the Warmest Colour
3. Sally Hawkins – Blue Jasmine

=== Best Screenplay ===
1. Richard Linklater, Ethan Hawke, and Julie Delpy – Before Midnight
2. Joel Coen and Ethan Coen – Inside Llewyn Davis
3. Eric Warren Singer and David O. Russell – American Hustle

=== Best Cinematography ===
1. Bruno Delbonnel – Inside Llewyn Davis
2. Emmanuel Lubezki – Gravity
3. Phedon Papamichael – Nebraska

=== Best Non-Fiction Film ===
1. The Act of Killing (TIE)
1. At Berkeley (TIE)
2. Leviathan

=== Best Foreign-Language Film ===
1. Blue Is the Warmest Colour
2. A Touch of Sin
3. The Great Beauty

=== Film Heritage Awards ===
1. To the Museum of Modern Art, for its wide-ranging retrospective of the films of Allan Dwan.
2. Too Much Johnson, the surviving reels from Orson Welles' first professional film. Discovered by Cinemazero (Pordenone) and Cineteca del Friuli, funded by the National Film Preservation Foundation, and restored by the George Eastman Museum.
3. The British Film Institute for restorations of Alfred Hitchcock's nine silent features.
4. To the DVD American Treasures from the New Zealand Film Archive.
