= Anita Gonzalez =

American writer, director and educator

- Education: Florida State University (BA) University of Wisconsin-Madison (PhD)
- Occupations: Writer, Director, Educator
- Father: Cambell Gonzalez
- Website: https://anitagonzalez.com/

Anita Gonzalez is an American writer, director and educator. She is most commonly known for her works that discuss human identity, highlighting experiences based on race, ethnicity, and gender. She has received a number of awards for her works, including the Shirley Verret Awards in 2022 and the Distinguished Faculty Achievement Award, from the University of Michigan, and in 2023 was elected to the American Academy of Arts and Sciences. Since 2021, Dr. Gonzalez has been a co-founder of Georgetown University's Racial Justice Institute and is the director of the Woodshed Center for Art, Thought, and Culture there.

== Early life and education ==
Gonzalez was raised in New Jersey, and resides in Washington, D.C.

In 1977, Gonzalez began attending Florida State University, where she pursued a degree in theater. She graduated in 1979 with a Bachelor of Arts degree in theater. In 1994, Gonzalez began attending University of Wisconsin–Madison, and graduated in June 1997 with a PhD degree in theater and performing arts.

== Career ==
=== Productions ===
Gonzalez has written and directed numerous theatrical productions, including a number of pieces that discuss a common theme of human experiences through identity. These productions include Blood Wedding in 2009, performed in April 16 to April 26, The Hunting of The Snark, first performed in January 2013, Ybor City the Musical, first performed in May 2015, Sun & Shadows, first performed in June 2015, The Living Lakes, first performed in May 2015, Zora on My Mind, first performed in September 2019, Sunset Dreams, first performed in September 2021, Waterflow, first performed in November 2022, Courthouse Bells, first performed in January 2023, Kumanana, first performed in June 2023, and Faces in the Flames, first performed in June 2023, for which she and Nathan Felix received an IDEA opera grant from Opera America in 2024.

=== Publications ===
Gonzalez also is a published author. Her publications include Jarocho’s Soul: Cultural Identity and Afro-Mexican Dance, published in 2004, Afro-Mexico: Dancing Between Myth and Reality, published in 2010, Black Performance Theory, published in 2014, and Performance, Dance and Political Economy: Bodies at the End of the World, published in 2021. She has also published journal articles, an interactive website, conference proceedings, and blogs.

In addition to writing publications, Gonzalez also edits writing works in the Women's Innovations in Theater Dance and Performance: Leaders Volume. She has edited academic sources, including Performance, Dance, and Political Economy, published April 22, 2021.

=== Teaching ===
Today, Gonzalez works as a professor of both performing arts and African American studies, at Georgetown University. She also has experience being an Associate Dean for Faculty Affairs and a professor of Theater at the University of Michigan. She is also a member of the Dramatists Guild, the National Theatre Conference, and a founding member of the Urban Bush Women, with her work supported by the National Endowment for the Arts, NYFA, the Rockefeller Foundation the Mid-Atlantic Arts Association, the Bellagio Center, and the Fideicomiso for the United States and Mexico Arts Exchange.

She also offers two online courses entitled Storytelling for Social Change and Black Performance as Social Protest, reaching over 50,000 students to date and was inducted into the American Academy of Arts and Sciences, a US honorary society and policy research center.
