= Nathan Felix =

American classical music composer

- Born: Nathan Felix; May 25, 1981 (age 44)
- Origin: Austin, Texas
- Genres: Classical music, Opera
- Occupation: Composer
- Instruments: Piano, guitar
- Years active: 2008–present
- Website: electrochestral.com

Nathan Felix (born 1981) is a classical music composer from Austin, Texas. He now resides in San Antonio. He is also the band leader for The Noise Revival Orchestra.

Felix is known for his innovative approaches to opera.

== Career ==
Felix's symphonies have been performed in Bulgaria, Portugal, Denmark, Mongolia and the United States with a performance of his 2nd Symphony, Neon Heaven, at SPOT Festival.

In 2013, his 1st Symphony, The Curse the Cross & the Lion, was featured by the BBC and later made into a documentary entitled The Curse & The Symphony. The documentary has screened at 28 film festivals, and was picked up by Gaiam TV. In 2015, PBS affiliate KLRU featured Felix's 6-Piano Project on an episode of Arts in Context, in which he restored abandoned pianos to premiere his works written for six pianos and then donated the pianos to lower-income schools in Austin. 6-Pianos was nominated for a Lone Star Emmy in 2016. The 6-Piano Project has since been presented in San Antonio (2016), Barcelona (2017), Melbourne (2017) and Houston (2019).

In 2018, Felix premiered his Headphone Opera entitled The War Bride at Luminaria Festival in San Antonio with two concerts. Based on the memoir of Felix's grandmother, Jean Groundsell-Contreras, The War Bride examines the subject of immigration in the 1940s during World War II and in the present time. Felix also expanded on his music for six pianos with music for a musitronic six-sided keyboard and choir entitled Yachting with the Kennedys.

In 2020, Felix released Öcalan, a chamber opera inspired by Kurdish political activist Abdullah Öcalan.

In 2021, Felix premiered his chamber opera Ribas-Dominicci on Texas Public Radio. Ribas-Dominicci is inspired by the life of Major Fernando Luis Ribas-Dominicci, a pilot in the U.S. Air Force who was killed during Operation El Dorado Canyon in 1986. In November, Texas Skies, featuring music for two pianos, was released with Timo Andres as pianist.

In 2022, Felix premiered two new Latinx operas for Hispanic heritage month: La Malinche - Traitor Savior, at Albuquerque Museum of Art and History; and No. 5, an opera about the loves of fashion designer Coco Chanel, in Orlando.

Felix and Anita Gonzalez received an IDEA opera grant from Opera America in 2024 for Faces in the Flames.

The Drake University piano program commissioned Felix to compose a classical composition for sixteen pianos. 16-Pianos in Surround Sound premiered in the Anderson Gallery at Drake University for two nights in March 2024.

Felix serves as music director for the San Antonio choir From Those Who Follow the Echoes, which premiered Felix’s Opera on a Bus.

== Personal life ==
He is of Mexican-American descent.

== Selected works ==
Opera

- The War Bride (2018)
- Öcalan (2020)
- Ribas-Dominicci (2021)
- La Malinche | Traitor Savior (2022)
- No. 5 (2022)
- The Great Flood (2023)
- Glory Gone (2023)
- The Cadence of Life (2023)
- The Paños Prophecy (2023)
- The Artificial Heart (2023)
- All is Apathetic in Love & War (2023)
- El Conquistador (2024)
- The Thinker (2024)
- The Meta-Opera (2026)

== Discography ==
=== Albums ===
- 2013 The Curse the Cross & the Lion
- 2015 Electrochestral
- 2016 Neon Heaven
- 2017 Hard Reset
- 2019 The War Bride
- 2020 Öcalan
- 2021 Texas Skies
- 2022 Santa-Almada
- 2024 City of Dreams
- 2025 Borderland
