= Sandra Adair =

American film editor

- Born: Sandra B. Estrin; 1952 (age 73–74); Carlsbad, New Mexico
- Occupation: Film editor
- Spouse: Dwight Adair (m. 1978)

Sandra Adair (born 1952) is an American film editor. Since 1993, with the film Dazed and Confused, she has worked with director Richard Linklater on over twenty feature films.

== Life and career ==
Sandra B. Adair (born Estrin) was born in Carlsbad, New Mexico, the daughter of Rachel and Herman Estrin. Her family moved to Las Vegas, Nevada, in the early 1960s.

Adair later lived in Los Angeles. In 1978, she married television director and filmmaker Dwight R. Adair (Dallas; Dynasty). In the beginning of her career, she often worked as assistant editor for her brother, Robert Estrin. Together, they worked on films and documentary features such as Desert Hearts (1985), Creation of the Universe (1985), What Happened to Kerouac? (1986) and Internal Affairs (1990). In 1991, she moved to Austin, Texas. Since 1993, she has edited all of Richard Linklater's films, and has co-produced some of them.

Adair received the ACE Eddie Award for her editing of Boyhood (2014). She was also nominated for the Academy Award for Best Film Editing for the film.

Adair is a member of the Academy of Motion Picture Arts and Sciences, of American Cinema Editors (A.C.E.) and Austin Film Society.

== Selected filmography ==
Editor
Year	Film	Director	Notes
1988	The Telephone	Rip Torn	
1990	Smoothtalker	Tom Milo	
1993	Dazed and Confused	Richard Linklater	First collaboration with Richard Linklater
1994	The Return of the Texas Chainsaw Massacre	Kim Henkel	
1995	Before Sunrise	Richard Linklater	
1996	SubUrbia	Richard Linklater	
1998	The Newton Boys	Richard Linklater	
1998	They Come at Night	Lindy Laub	
2001	Waking Life	Richard Linklater	
2001	Tape	Richard Linklater	
2003	Rolling Kansas	Thomas Haden Church	
2003	Sexless	Alex Holdridge	
2003	School of Rock	Richard Linklater	
2004	Before Sunset	Richard Linklater	
2005	Bad News Bears	Richard Linklater	
2006	Fast Food Nation	Richard Linklater	
2006	A Scanner Darkly	Richard Linklater	
2007	Elvis and Anabelle	Will Geiger	
2008	Me and Orson Welles	Richard Linklater	
2010	Everything Must Go	Dan Rush	
2011	Bernie	Richard Linklater	
2013	Before Midnight	Richard Linklater	
2014	Boyhood	Richard Linklater	
2015	Tumbledown	Sean Mewshaw	
2016	Everybody Wants Some!!	Richard Linklater	
2017	Last Flag Flying	Richard Linklater	
2019	Where'd You Go, Bernadette	Richard Linklater	
2021	Blue Miracle	Julio Quintana	
2022	Apollo 10 1/2: A Space Age Childhood	Richard Linklater	
2022	Alone Together	Katie Holmes	
2023	Hit Man	Richard Linklater	Twentieth collaboration with Richard Linklater
2025	Blue Moon	Richard Linklater	
2025	Due West	Evan Miller	
TBA	Merrily We Roll Along	Richard Linklater	

Editorial department
Year	Film	Director	Role	Notes
1974	The Swinging Cheerleaders	Jack Hill	Assistant editor	
1976	Pipe Dreams	Stephen Verona	Assistant editor	
1976	Mansion of the Doomed	Michael Pataki	Assistant editor	
1977	Outlaw Blues	Richard T. Heffron	Assistant editor	Uncredited
1980	The Hollywood Knights	Floyd Mutrux	Assistant editor	
1981	True Confessions	Ulu Grosbard	First assistant editor	
1982	Jekyll and Hyde... Together Again	Jerry Belson	Assistant film editor	
1985	Desert Hearts	Donna Deitch	Assistant editor	
1990	Internal Affairs	Mike Figgis	Additional editor	
2015	The Teller and the Truth	Andrew Shapter	Supervising editor	
2021	Blue Miracle	Julio Quintana	Editor	

Producer
Year	Film	Director	Credit
2014	Boyhood	Richard Linklater	Co-producer

Documentaries

Editor
Year	Film	Director
2008	Inning by Inning: A Portrait of a Coach	Richard Linklater
2011	Sushi: The Global Catch	Mark Hall
2012	Shepard & Dark	Treva Wurmfeld
2015	A Single Frame	Brandon Dickerson
2016	At the Fork	John Papola
2017	The Secret Life of Lance Letscher	Herself
2020	Take Pains, Be Perfect	Kristi Frazier
2021	Without Getting Killed or Caught	Tamara Saviano; Paul Whitfield

Editorial department
Year	Film	Director	Role
1986	What Happened to Kerouac?	Lewis MacAdams; Richard Lerner	Assistant editor
2008	Tattooed Under Fire	Nancy Schiesari	Editing consultant

Director
Year	Film
2017	The Secret Life of Lance Letscher

Producer
Year	Film	Director	Credit
2008	Inning by Inning: A Portrait of a Coach	Richard Linklater	Associate producer
2012	Shepard & Dark	Treva Wurmfeld	Associate producer
2017	The Secret Life of Lance Letscher	Herself	Producer

Thanks
Year	Film	Director	Role
2014	21 Years: Richard Linklater	Michael Dunaway; Tara Wood	Special thanks
2019	Running with Beto	David Modigliani	Thanks

Shorts

Editor
Year	Film	Director
2003	Live from Shiva's Dance Floor	Richard Linklater
2019	Another Day at the Office	Richard Linklater

TV documentaries

Editor
Year	Film	Director
1992	Laurel & Hardy: A Tribute to the Boys	Gene Rosow; Jeff Weinstock

Editorial department
Year	Film	Role
1985	Creation of the Universe	Assistant editor

TV movies

Editor
Year	Film	Director
1986	Maricela	Christine Burrill
2004	$5.15/Hr.	Richard Linklater

Editorial department
Year	Film	Director	Role
1978	King	Abby Mann	Assistant editor
1979	Anatomy of a Seduction	Steven Hilliard Stern	Assistant editor

TV series

Editor
Year	Title	Notes
1991	American Playhouse	1 episode
2000	Dream House	
2022	LBJ: Triumph and Tragedy	2 episodes

Editorial department
Year	Title	Role	Notes
1978	King	Assistant editor	3 episodes
2010	Independent Lens	Consulting editor	1 episode

Actress
Year	Title	Role	Notes
2012	Up to Speed	Curry House	1 episode

TV shorts

Editor
Year	Film	Director
1991	The Hollow Boy	Noel Black

== See also ==
- List of film director and editor collaborations
