= Before the Music Dies =

- Directed by: Andrew Shapter
- Produced by: Joel Rasmussen
- Narrated by: Forest Whitaker
- Release date: March 12, 2006 (SXSW)
- Running time: 95 minutes
- Country: United States
- Language: English

Before the Music Dies (B4MD) is a 2006 U.S. documentary film that criticizes the American music industry and the increasing commercialization of the art of music over the past thirty years. The film features interviews and performances from such musicians and groups as Doyle Bramhall II, Erykah Badu, Eric Clapton, Dave Matthews, Branford Marsalis, Elvis Costello, Bonnie Raitt and My Morning Jacket. It was directed by Andrew Shapter, produced by Joel Rasmussen, and co-written by Shapter and Rasmussen. The film premiered on March 12, 2006, at the South by Southwest film festival in Austin, Texas.

== Synopsis ==
The film looks at the evolution of American popular music and discusses the marketing of contemporary pop stars. "The reality is that superficiality is in," says Marsalis. "And depth and quality is kind of out."
