= Christos V. Konstantakopoulos =

Greek film producer and writer

- Born: Christos V. Konstantakopoulos
- Other names: Christos Constantakopoulos Christos Konstantakopoulos; Hristos Konstantakopoulos Christos Konstantakopouos
- Occupations: Film producer, writer
- Years active: 2009–present

Christos V. Konstantakopoulos is a Greek film producer and writer working for Faliro House Productions.

== Producing career ==
He began producing in 2009 and in 2011 he served as executive producer in Jeff Nichols' Take Shelter. In 2013 he produced Richard Linklater's Before Midnight, the third entry of the Before trilogy, for which he has been nominated for several awards. He made his screenwriting debut in 2014 with Yannis Economides' Mikro psari. In 2014 he worked in the Cannes-selected Only Lovers Left Alive and Love Is Strange, among others.

Among his credits as producer or executive producer is Terrence Malick's Knight of Cups.
