= Lee Daniel =

American cinematographer

- Born: Lee Cavender Daniel; January 23, 1962 (age 63); Dallas, Texas
- Occupation: Cinematographer
- Relatives: Bill Daniel (brother)

Lee Cavender Daniel (born January 23, 1962) is an American cinematographer. He was born in Dallas, Texas. His best known films are Boyhood and Dazed and Confused, both directed by Richard Linklater. Daniel has worked on many of Linklater's films and worked with Linklater as a co-founder of the Austin Film Society. He is a graduate of the University of Texas at Austin. He helped his brother Bill Daniel on the underground hobo culture film Who is Bozo Texino?.

His trademark is "709" and the number can be seen in several of the films on which he has worked. Much like the trademark appearances by Alfred Hitchcock, they are always quick and subtle.

== Selected filmography ==
- Boyhood (2014)
- The Dungeon Masters (2008)
- Me, Myself, & I (2007)
- The Unforeseen (2007)
- Fast Food Nation (2006)
- You're Gonna Miss Me (2005)
- Los Lonely Boys (2004) (V) (videos "Heaven", "More than Love [Spanish]", "More than Love" and "More than Love [Performance]")
- Be Here to Love Me: A Film About Townes Van Zandt (2004)
- Before Sunset (2004)
- Alamo Mania (2004) (TV)
- Lubbock Lights (2003)
- From an Objective Point of View (2002)
- The Monster (2001)
- I Remember Me (2000)
- Don't Dance with Death (1999) (director of photography)
- Secrets of the CIA (1998) (TV)
- SubUrbia (1996) (director of photography)
- Before Sunrise (1995)
- The Making of '...And God Spoke' (1993)
- Dazed and Confused (1993)
- Slacker (1991)
- Never Leave Nevada (1990)
