= Before Sunrise =

1995 romantic drama film by Richard Linklater

- Theatrical release poster
- Directed by: Richard Linklater
- Written by: Richard Linklater; Kim Krizan
- Produced by: Anne Walker-McBay
- Starring: Ethan Hawke; Julie Delpy
- Cinematography: Lee Daniel
- Edited by: Sandra Adair
- Music by: Fred Frith
- Production companies: Castle Rock Entertainment; Detour Filmproduction; Filmhaus Films
- Distributed by: Columbia Pictures
- Release dates: January 19, 1995 (Sundance); January 27, 1995 (United States)
- Running time: 101 minutes
- Countries: United States; Austria
- Language: English
- Budget: $2.5 million
- Box office: $22.5 million

Before Sunrise is a 1995 romantic drama film directed by Richard Linklater and co-written by Linklater and Kim Krizan, and is the first installment in the Before trilogy. In the film, Jesse (Ethan Hawke) and Céline (Julie Delpy) meet on a train and disembark in Vienna to spend the night together.

Inspired by personal experiences, Linklater collaborated with Krizan, who previously appeared in his films Slacker (1990) and Dazed and Confused (1993), to develop the film's screenplay. Casting was extensive; it took nine months for Hawke and Delpy to be cast. Principal photography took place in Vienna. The plot is considered minimalistic, consisting mostly of monologues and extended dialogue between the characters. The film explores themes and perspectives on life, love, time, death, self-discovery, and postmodern romance.

Before Sunrise premiered at the Sundance Film Festival on January 19, 1995, and was theatrically released in the United States by Columbia Pictures eight days later. It grossed $22.5 million and received critical acclaim for its screenplay, Linklater's direction, and acting performances. Before Sunrise appeared on many critics' lists of the greatest films of the year and has since gone on to receive a rating of 100% on Rotten Tomatoes. The sequel Before Sunset was released in 2004, and Before Midnight, the third film, was released in 2013. Before Sunrise was selected for preservation in the U.S. National Film Registry's class of 2025 as being "culturally, historically or aesthetically significant".

== Plot ==
On June 16, 1994, Jesse meets Céline on a train from Budapest, and they strike up a conversation. Jesse is going to Vienna with a Eurail pass to catch a flight back to the United States, whereas Céline is returning to university in Paris after visiting her grandmother in Budapest. When they reach Vienna, Jesse asks Céline to disembark with him, saying that 10 or 20 years down the road, she might not be happy with her significant other and might wonder how her life would have been different if she had picked someone else. Alternatively, she may just realize Jesse himself is not that different from the rest. Lacking the money to rent a room for the night, they decide to roam around in Vienna until Jesse's flight the next morning.

After visiting a few landmarks in Vienna, they share a kiss at the top of the Wiener Riesenrad at sunset and start to feel a romantic connection. As they continue to roam around the city, they begin to talk more openly with each other, with conversations ranging from topics about love, life, religion, and their observations of Vienna.

When they are walking alongside the Donaukanal, they are approached by a man who offers to write them a poem with a word of their choice inside. Jesse and Céline decide on the word "milkshake” and are soon presented with the poem "Delusion Angel" (written for the film by poet David Jewell)—a poem that Jesse cynically claims the man had already previously written and just inserts the words people choose.

Later, while playing pinball at a local club, Céline tells Jesse that her last boyfriend broke up with her six months ago, claiming that she "loved him too much.” When questioned, Jesse reveals he had initially come to Europe to spend time with his girlfriend who was studying in Madrid, but they broke up soon after he was there. He found a cheap flight home, via Vienna, but it did not leave for two weeks so he bought a Eurail pass and traveled around Europe. In a Viennese café, Jesse and Céline stage fake phone conversations with each other, playing each other's friends they pretend to call. Céline reveals that she was ready to get off the train with Jesse before he convinced her. Jesse reveals that after he broke up with his girlfriend, he bought a flight that really was not much cheaper, and all he really wanted was an escape from his life.

They admit their attraction to each other and how the night has made them feel, though they understand that they probably will not see each other again. They decide to make the best of what time they have left. They then get a bottle of wine and share it together in a park and begin discussing whether or not they should have sex. Céline says that she doesn't just want to be a one-night stand for Jesse; Jesse then explains that, if given the choice, he would marry her instead of never seeing her again. They begin kissing passionately and embracing each other, then it is heavily implied Jesse and Céline have sex in the park. The film ends the next day at the train station, where, just as Céline's train is about to leave, the couple decide not to exchange any contact information but instead meet at the same place in six months.

== Cast ==
- Ethan Hawke as Jesse
- Julie Delpy as Céline
- Andrea Eckert as wife on train
- Hanno Pöschl as husband on train
- Karl Bruckschwaiger as guy on bridge
- Tex Rubinowitz as guy on bridge
- Erni Mangold as palm reader
- Dominik Castell as street poet
- Haymon Maria Buttinger as bartender
- Bilge Jeschim as belly dancer
- Sanya Sirohi as Assistant Professor
- Adam Goldberg as man sleeping on train (uncredited)

== Production ==
Before Sunrise was inspired by a woman named Amy Lehrhaupt, whom writer/director Richard Linklater met in a toy shop in Philadelphia in 1989. They walked around the city together, conversing deep into the night. In 2013, Linklater revealed that Lehrhaupt had died in a motorcycle accident a few weeks before filming began for Before Sunrise, something he only learned after its release.

Originally, in the screenplay, who the two people were and the city they spend time in was vague. Linklater realized that because the film is so much a dialogue between a man and a woman, it was important to have a strong female co-writer. He chose Kim Krizan, who had small roles in his two previous films Slacker and Dazed and Confused. According to Linklater, he "loved the way her mind worked – a constant stream of confident and intelligent ideas".

Linklater and Krizan long discussed the concept of the film and the characters. He wanted to explore the "relationship side of life and discover two people who had complete anonymity and try to find out who they really were". He decided to put Jesse and Céline in a foreign country because "when you're traveling, you're much more open to experiences outside your usual realm". He and Krizan worked on an outline. They wrote the actual screenplay in 11 days.

Linklater spent nine months casting the film because he had trouble finding the right actors for the roles of Jesse and Céline. When Linklater first considered casting Hawke, he thought that the actor was too young for the part. Linklater saw Hawke at a play in New York City and reconsidered after talking to the actor. For Céline, Linklater met Julie Delpy and liked her personality. After they did a final reading, Linklater knew that Delpy and Hawke were right for the roles. Once Delpy and Hawke agreed to do the film, they went to Austin and talked with Linklater and Krizan for a few days.

=== Authorship ===
In 2016, Delpy told Creative Screenwriting, "Ethan and I basically re-wrote all of it. There was an original screenplay, but it wasn't very romantic, believe it or not. It was just a lot of talking, rather than romance. Richard hired us because he knew we were writing and he wanted us to bring that romance to the film. We brought those romantic ideas and that's how I wrote something that actually got made, without really getting credit for it. But, if I had written Before Sunrise and been credited, then I doubt it would have been financed". In 2019, credited screenwriter Kim Krizan disputed Delpy's claim that the actors re-wrote the entire script. Linklater and Krizan are credited for writing Before Sunrise, while Delpy and Hawke are credited for co-writing the sequels and Krizan credited with story credit for Before Sunset and characters created by credit on Before Midnight.

== Themes ==
Before Sunrise revolves largely around the twin themes of self-fulfillment and self-discovery through a significant other, charging the concept through the introduction of a twelve-hour time constraint in which the goals implicit to the two themes have to be realized. They are underlined by the poem "Delusion Angel", which evokes a longing for complete and unifying, possibly even redeeming, understanding between two partners in a world which is itself unknowable, and over which one can exercise no control.

An important role is played by the theme of spontaneous and uninhibited response to one's environment. It is reflected by the actions of Jesse and Céline, whose joint stream of consciousness, initiated by a previously unmeditated decision to leave the train together, allows them to temporarily detach themselves from the world, and enter a realm where only the other's company is of importance. Come morning, Jesse remarks that he and Céline have again entered "real time".

It could be argued that Before Sunrise subsumes its main themes under that of life. In one scene, Céline and Jesse visit the Friedhof der Namenlosen, the Cemetery of the Nameless in Simmering. The people buried in the cemetery have found anonymity in death; by learning to know and understand one another, Céline and Jesse experience and embrace life, suspending their own mortality.

The film leaves audience members to decide for themselves whether Jesse and Céline will meet again in six months. Critic Robin Wood has written that, after he published an essay on the film (in a 1996 issue of CineAction), Linklater wrote him to say that "neither he nor the two actors ever doubted that the date would be kept."

The film takes place on June 16, Bloomsday.

== Reception ==
Before Sunrise had its world premiere at the 1995 Sundance Film Festival. It was released in the United States on January 27, 1995.

=== Box office ===
The film grossed $1.4 million in 363 theaters on its opening weekend and grossed $5.5 million in the United States and Canada and $22.5 million worldwide, nine times its $2.5 million budget.

=== Critical reception ===
Rotten Tomatoes reported that 100% of critics have given the film a positive review, based on 49 reviews, with an average rating of 8.4/10. The site's critics consensus reads "Thought-provoking and beautifully filmed, Before Sunrise is an intelligent, unabashedly romantic look at modern love, led by marvelously natural performances from Ethan Hawke and Julie Delpy." On Metacritic, the film has a weighted average score of 79 out of 100 based on 19 critics, indicating "generally favorable" reviews. Audiences surveyed by CinemaScore gave the film an average grade of "B" on an A+ to F scale.

Film critic Roger Ebert gave Before Sunrise three out of four and described Delpy as "ravishingly beautiful and, more important, warm and matter-of-fact, speaking English so well the screenplay has to explain it (she spent some time in the States)". In her review for The New York Times, Janet Maslin wrote "Before Sunrise is as uneven as any marathon conversation might be, combining colorful, disarming insights with periodic lulls. The film maker clearly wants things this way, with both these young characters trying on ideas and attitudes as if they were new clothes". Hal Hinson, in his review for The Washington Post wrote "Before Sunrise is not a big movie, or one with big ideas, but it is a cut above the banal twentysomething love stories you usually see at the movies. This one, at least, treats young people as real people".

In his review for the Los Angeles Times, Peter Rainer wrote "It's an attempt to make a mainstream youth movie with a bit more feeling and mysteriousness than most, and, in this, it succeeds". Marjorie Baumgarten, in her review for The Austin Chronicle, wrote "Before Sunrise represents a maturation of Linklater's work in terms of its themes and choice of characters". In his review for The New Yorker, Anthony Lane wrote "Just once, for a single day, Jesse and Céline have given life the sort of shape and charge that until now they have found only in fiction, and may never find again". Entertainment Weekly gave the film an "A−" rating and Owen Gleiberman wrote "Small movies can be as daring as big ones, and Linklater, in his offhand way, is working without a net here. Before Sunrise may be the closest an American has come to the discursive talk gamesmanship of Eric Rohmer".

Online film critic James Berardinelli has cited the film as "the best romance of all time". Entertainment Weekly rated Before Sunrise #25 on its Top 25 Modern Romances list. In a 2008 Empire poll, Before Sunrise was ranked as the 200th greatest movie of all time. In 2010 British newspaper The Guardian ranked Before Sunrise/Before Sunset #3 on its critics' list of 25 best romantic films of all time, and #2 in an online readers' poll.

=== Accolades ===
Before Sunrise was entered into the 1995 Berlin International Film Festival, where Linklater won the Silver Bear for Best Director and the film was nominated for the Golden Bear. Hawke and Delpy were nominated for Best Kiss at the 1995 MTV Movie Awards.

== Sequels ==
A sequel, Before Sunset, was released in 2004 with even more positive reviews. A third film, Before Midnight, was released in 2013, with a wide critical acclaim.

Jesse and Céline also had a brief scene together in Linklater's 2001 animated film Waking Life.
