= Village Voice Film Poll =

Annual polling

The Village Voice Film Poll was an annual polling by The Village Voice film section of more than 100 major film critics for alternative media sources. Although the majority of the critics work for the alt-weeklies, a number are former Voice critics who now work for the mainstream media or have retired. It was compiled every year from top 10 lists, best performance lists, and votes for other categories. The poll results were printed alongside the annotated top 10 lists of J. Hoberman, Dennis Lim and Michael Atkinson.

The 1999 poll included votes for Best Film of the Decade (Safe), Best Director of the Decade (Hou Hsiao-hsien), and Best Film of the Century (Citizen Kane).

In the 2009 poll, Mulholland Drive was voted the best film of the decade.

The Village Voice ceased publication altogether in August 2018. However, much like the Village Voice's own Pazz & Jop poll, the Film Poll has continued on through different publications since the newspaper ended. Film critic Mike D'Angelo has continued to survey frequent contributors of the poll for the Best Film category. The results were published in Slate in 2018 and Filmmaker in 2019 and 2020.

== Winners ==
=== Best Film ===
- 1999: Being John Malkovich
- 2000: Beau Travail
- 2001: Mulholland Drive
- 2002: Far from Heaven
- 2003: Lost in Translation
- 2004: Before Sunset
- 2005: A History of Violence
- 2006: Army of Shadows
- 2007: There Will Be Blood
- 2008: WALL-E
- 2009: The Hurt Locker
- 2010: The Social Network
- 2011: The Tree of Life
- 2012: The Master
- 2013: Inside Llewyn Davis
- 2014: Boyhood
- 2015: Mad Max: Fury Road
- 2016: Moonlight
- 2017: Phantom Thread
- 2018: First Reformed
- 2019: The Irishman
- 2020: First Cow

=== Best Director ===
- 1999: Mike Leigh – Topsy-Turvy
- 2000: Edward Yang – Yi Yi
- 2001: David Lynch – Mulholland Drive
- 2002: Todd Haynes – Far from Heaven
- 2003: Gus Van Sant – Elephant
- 2004: Richard Linklater – Before Sunset
- 2005: David Cronenberg – A History of Violence
- 2010: Olivier Assayas – Carlos
- 2011: Terrence Malick – The Tree of Life
- 2012: Paul Thomas Anderson – The Master
- 2013: Steve McQueen – 12 Years a Slave
- 2014: Richard Linklater – Boyhood
- 2015: George Miller – Mad Max: Fury Road
- 2016: Barry Jenkins – Moonlight
- 2017: Paul Thomas Anderson – Phantom Thread

=== Best Lead Performance ===
- 1999: Hilary Swank – Boys Don't Cry
- 2000: Gillian Anderson – The House of Mirth
- 2001: Naomi Watts – Mulholland Drive
- 2002: Julianne Moore – Far from Heaven
- 2003: Bill Murray – Lost in Translation
- 2004: Imelda Staunton – Vera Drake
- 2005: Heath Ledger – Brokeback Mountain
- 2017: Saoirse Ronan – Lady Bird

=== Best Actor ===
- 2006: Ryan Gosling – Half Nelson
- 2007: Daniel Day-Lewis – There Will Be Blood
- 2008: Sean Penn – Milk
- 2009: Jeremy Renner – The Hurt Locker
- 2010: Jesse Eisenberg – The Social Network
- 2011: Michael Shannon – Take Shelter
- 2012: Joaquin Phoenix – The Master
- 2013: Chiwetel Ejiofor – 12 Years a Slave
- 2014: Jake Gyllenhaal – Nightcrawler
- 2015: Géza Röhrig – Son of Saul
- 2016: Casey Affleck – Manchester by the Sea

=== Best Actress ===
- 2006: Helen Mirren – The Queen
- 2007: Anamaria Marinca – 4 Months, 3 Weeks and 2 Days
- 2008: Sally Hawkins – Happy-Go-Lucky
- 2009: Tilda Swinton – Julia
- 2010: Jennifer Lawrence – Winter's Bone
- 2011: Anna Paquin – Margaret
- 2012: Rachel Weisz – The Deep Blue Sea
- 2013: Adèle Exarchopoulos – Blue Is the Warmest Colour
- 2014: Marion Cotillard – Two Days, One Night and The Immigrant
- 2015: Charlotte Rampling – 45 Years
- 2016: Isabelle Huppert – Elle

=== Best Supporting Performance ===
- 1999: Chloë Sevigny – Boys Don't Cry
- 2000: Benicio del Toro – Traffic
- 2001: Steve Buscemi – Ghost World
- 2002: Chris Cooper – Adaptation.
- 2003: Peter Sarsgaard – Shattered Glass
- 2004: Mark Wahlberg – I Heart Huckabees
- 2005: Maria Bello – A History of Violence
- 2017: Laurie Metcalf – Lady Bird

=== Best Supporting Actor ===
- 2006: Jackie Earle Haley – Little Children
- 2007: Javier Bardem – No Country for Old Men
- 2008: Heath Ledger – The Dark Knight
- 2009: Christoph Waltz – Inglourious Basterds
- 2010: John Hawkes – Winter's Bone
- 2011: Albert Brooks – Drive
- 2012: Matthew McConaughey – Magic Mike
- 2013: James Franco – Spring Breakers
- 2014: J. K. Simmons – Whiplash
- 2015: Mark Rylance – Bridge of Spies
- 2016: Mahershala Ali – Moonlight

=== Best Supporting Actress ===
- 2006: Luminița Gheorghiu – The Death of Mr. Lazarescu
- 2007: Cate Blanchett – I'm Not There
- 2008: Penélope Cruz – Vicky Cristina Barcelona
- 2009: Mo'Nique – Precious
- 2010: Jacki Weaver – Animal Kingdom
- 2011: Jeannie Berlin – Margaret
- 2012: Amy Adams – The Master
- 2013: Lupita Nyong'o – 12 Years a Slave
- 2014: Patricia Arquette – Boyhood
- 2015: Kristen Stewart – Clouds of Sils Maria
- 2016: Lily Gladstone – Certain Women

=== Best Documentary ===
- 2001: The Gleaners and I
- 2002: Bowling for Columbine
- 2003: The Fog of War: Eleven Lessons from the Life of Robert S. McNamara
- 2004: Los Angeles Plays Itself
- 2005: Grizzly Man
- 2006: Darwin's Nightmare
- 2007: No End in Sight
- 2008: Man on Wire
- 2009: Anvil! The Story of Anvil
- 2010: Exit Through the Gift Shop
- 2011: The Interrupters
- 2012: This Is Not a Film
- 2013: The Act of Killing
- 2014: Citizenfour
- 2015: The Look of Silence
- 2016: O.J.: Made in America
- 2017: Faces Places
