= Alliance of Women Film Journalists Award for Best Woman Screenwriter =

The Alliance of Women Film Journalists Award for Best Woman Screenwriter is an annual award given by the Alliance of Women Film Journalists. The award is often referred to as an EDA as a tribute to AWFJ founder Jennifer Merin's mother, actress Eda Reiss Merin. EDA is also an acronym for Excellent Dynamic Activism.

== Winners ==
- "†" indicates Academy Award-winning screenplay.
- "‡" indicates Academy Award-nominated screenplay.

=== 2000s ===
Year	Screenwriter(s)	Film	Ref.
2007	Tamara Jenkins	The Savages	
2007	Diablo Cody	Juno	
2007	Sarah Polley	Away from Her	
2007	Adrienne Shelly	Waitress	
2008	Jenny Lumet	Rachel Getting Married	
2008	Courtney Hunt	Frozen River	
2008	Kelly Reichardt	Wendy and Lucy	
2009	Jane Campion	Bright Star	
2009	Nora Ephron	Julie & Julia	
2009	Rebecca Miller	The Private Lives of Pippa Lee	

=== 2010s ===
Year	Screenwriter(s)	Film	Ref.
2010	Lisa Cholodenko	The Kids Are All Right	
2010	Andrea Arnold	Fish Tank	
2010	Sofia Coppola	Somewhere	
2010	Debra Granik	Winter's Bone	
2010	Nicole Holofcener	Please Give	
2010	Laeta Kalogridis	Shutter Island	
2011	Kristen Wiig and Annie Mumolo	Bridesmaids	
2011	Diablo Cody	Young Adult	
2011	Abi Morgan	The Iron Lady	
2011	Lynne Ramsay and Rory Kinnear	We Need to Talk About Kevin	
2011	Dee Rees	Pariah	
2012	Lucy Alibar (and Benh Zeitlin)	Beasts of the Southern Wild	
2012	Zoe Kazan	Ruby Sparks	
2012	Ava DuVernay	Middle of Nowhere	
2012	Sarah Polley	Take This Waltz	
2013	Nicole Holofcener	Enough Said	
2013	Lake Bell	In a World...	
2013	Julie Delpy	Before Midnight	
2013	Jennifer Lee	Frozen	
2013	Sarah Polley	Stories We Tell	
2014	Gillian Flynn	Gone Girl	
2014	Jennifer Kent	The Babadook	
2014	Gillian Robespierre	Obvious Child	
2015	Emma Donoghue	Room	
2015	Marielle Heller	The Diary of a Teenage Girl	
2015	Phyllis Nagy	Carol	
2015	Amy Schumer	Trainwreck	
2016	Kelly Reichardt	Certain Women	
2016	Andrea Arnold	American Honey	
2016	Rebecca Miller	Maggie's Plan	
2016	Lorene Scafaria	The Meddler	
2016	Laura Terruso	Hello, My Name Is Doris	
2017	Greta Gerwig	Lady Bird	
2017	Liz Hannah and Josh Singer	The Post	
2017	Dee Rees and Virgil Williams	Mudbound	

== See also ==
- List of media awards honoring women
