= Kim Krizan =

American writer and actress (born 1961)

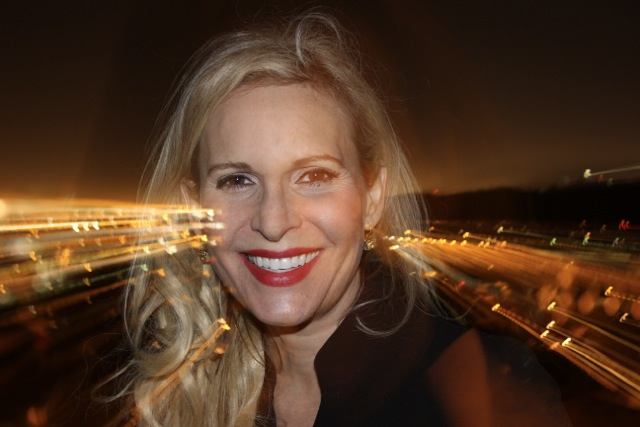
- Krizan in 2014
- Born: Kim Arnette Krizan; November 1, 1961 (age 65); Hawthorne, California, U.S.
- Occupations: Writer, actress
- Notable work: Before trilogy
- Spouse: Chip Mosher (m. 1999)

Kim Krizan (born November 1, 1961) is an American writer and actress best known for originating the story and characters in the Before trilogy with her writing on Before Sunrise (1995) and Before Sunset (2004), the latter of which earned her nominations for the Academy Award for Best Adapted Screenplay and Writers Guild of America Award in the same category. The trilogy is based on characters she created with Richard Linklater. Krizan lives in Los Angeles, where she writes and teaches writing courses, most notably at UCLA. In 2021, she launched a video-based writing class on Patreon.

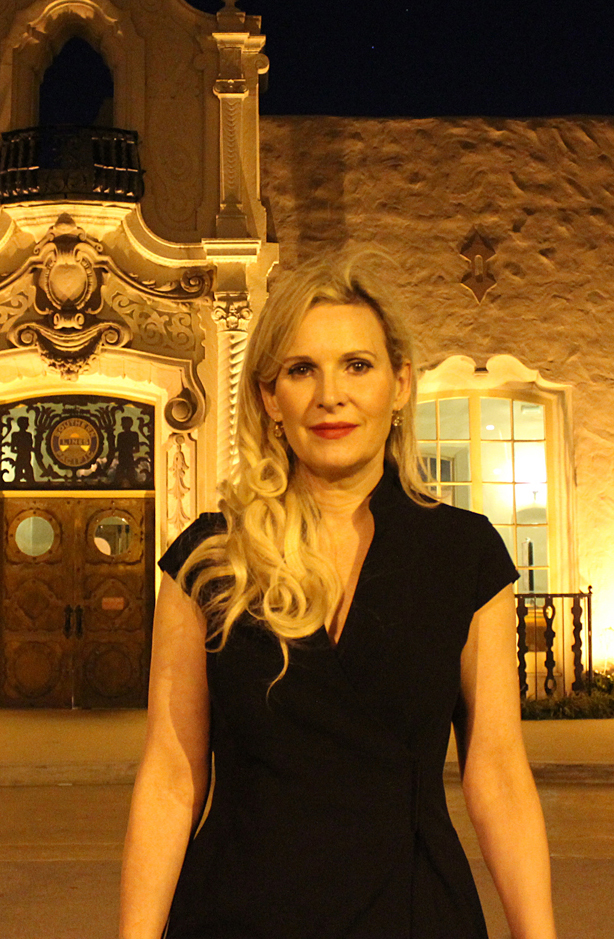
Krizan at "Double Indemnity" train station 2012

== Life and career ==
Krizan was featured in Linklater's Slacker (1990) and Waking Life (2001). She played the high school teacher Ginny Stroud in Dazed and Confused (1993). Krizan also acted and wrote her monologue in Waking Life.

In October 2012, Publishers Weekly spotlighted Krizan's self-publishing efforts on Kickstarter for her debut non-fiction book Original Sins: Trade Secrets of the Femme Fatale. The Kickstarter campaign was successfully funded in November 2012.

In 2013, Krizan published an article in the HuffPost revealing she had found a previously unpublished love letter Gore Vidal wrote to the diarist Anaïs Nin. This letter contradicts Vidal's previous characterization of his relationship with Nin, showing that Vidal did have feelings for her that he denied in his autobiography, Palimpsest. Krizan did this research in the runup to the release of the latest volume of Nin's uncensored diary, Mirages, to which she wrote the foreword.

In 2019, Krizan published Spy in the House of Anaïs Nin, an examination of long-buried letters, papers, and original manuscripts Krizan found while doing archival work in Nin's Los Angeles home.

In 2024, Krizan was credited as a screenwriter on a Chanel advertising campaign directed by Inez & Vinoodh. The campaign featured a short film starring Brad Pitt and Penélope Cruz.
