= Andrew Shapter =

American filmmaker (1966–2019)

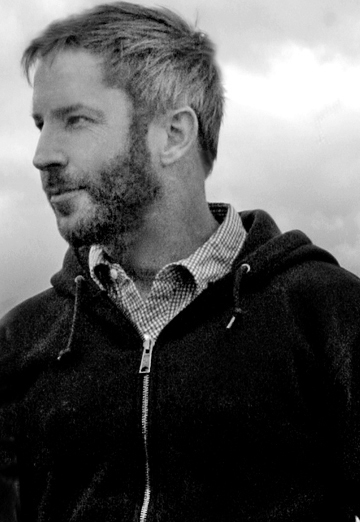
- Born: December 30, 1966; Fort Worth, Texas, United States
- Died: February 23, 2019 (aged 52)
- Education: Texas State University
- Occupations: Director, Photographer, Writer, Producer
- Years active: 1992–2019

Andrew Shapter (December 30, 1966 – February 23, 2019) was an American film director, producer, writer and photographer. Shapter is known for his documentaries, Before the Music Dies (2006) and Happiness Is (2009), his feature film The Teller and the Truth (2015), his music videos with Willie Nelson and The Roots, and his U.N. Summit video on refugees, Refugees Are... Shapter was a partner at the creative production company Roadwings Entertainment, which has offices in Austin, Las Vegas, and San Francisco.

== Early life ==
Andrew Shapter was born in Fort Worth, Texas, and he majored in Political Science at Texas State University. During his college years, he was a well known lead singer in a few cover bands, most notably " All Shook Down", which had a number one hit in Botswana. In 1992 Shapter graduated from college and interned with the National Wildlife Federation in Washington DC. He then went on to work as a professional photographer for 15 years before turning his attention to filmmaking, directing, writing, and producing./

== Career ==
=== Film ===
The Teller and the Truth (2015), Shapter's third feature film, explores the story of Francis Wetherbee, a beautiful young bank teller who's been missing since a 1974 bank robbery in Smithville, TX. The film was a mock documentary and a "social experiment", as Shapter blurred fact with fiction by blending multiple urban legends into one story. Social media popularized Shapter's version of Wetherbee's story, and the missing woman garnered a "cult-like" following. The Teller and the Truth was shot over a period of five years in Texas, California, France, and India while Shapter underwent radiation and chemotherapy. The film was edited with the help of Nevie Owens and Sandra Adair, members of Richard Linklater's editing team, and stars actress Leilani Galvan and Russell Gustave Ochoa. The Teller and the Truth was met with critical acclaim, and was awarded a score of 78% on Rotten Tomatoes.

In response to the 2011 wildfires in Bastrop, Texas, Andrew Shapter and Paul Galvan released a short film entitled Art from the Ashes to raise awareness of the devastation suffered by those affected and to promote charitable donations to aid recovery efforts.

=== Documentaries ===
The 2006 documentary, Before the Music Dies, was directed and co-written by Andrew Shapter, and produced and co-written by Joel Rasmussen. Before the Music Dies examines the rise of homogenization within the contemporary music industry. The documentary was an homage to Shapter's brother, John, who had died shortly before the idea for the film was conceived. The cast includes many noteworthy musicians including Erykah Badu, Dave Matthews, Eric Clapton, Branford Marsalis and Questlove. Before the Music Dies premiered at the 2006 South by Southwest Film Festival.

Shapter's follow up film, Happiness Is, was released in 2009, and examines the American "pursuit of happiness". Starring the Dalai Lama and Willie Nelson, Happiness Is examines the effect of upward and downward social comparisons. The film concludes with the sentiment, "Recognize what you have; appreciate what you have. Don't get caught up in envy for things you don't need."

The Road to ACL is a 2016 documentary exploring the culture surrounding ACL. It features interviews from bands and fans alike, as well as footage of band performances and clips of fans road-tripping to the festival. The documentary stars bands such as 21 Pilots, Foo Fighters and Alabama Shakes.

=== Television ===
Shapter has also completed video projects for HBO and National Geographic Television. He worked as a director and editor on the making of Treme, an HBO television drama series that portrays a New Orleans neighborhood's struggle to rebuild after Hurricane Katrina. Shapter also produced National Geographic TV's Geo Sessions.

=== Videography ===
In 2016, Shapter was tasked by the U.S. State Department to produce a video, Refugees Are..., documenting the worldwide refugee crisis. The goal of the video was to rally countries across the globe to further their support for the nearly 65 million people forcibly displaced due to violence and persecution. The video was narrated by Bono, produced by C3 Presents, and shown at the UN Summit on Refugees directly following President Barack Obama's final address to the United Nations.

Shapter filmed and directed a music video for Willie Nelson titled A Horse Called Music in 2013. This video marks the beginning of Shapter and Nelson's creative relationship, which has now turned into more than 100 hours of footage that they both hope to someday make into a documentary that peers into the artist's captivating private life.

In 2010, Shapter created a music video for The Roots' single, "Now or Never" from their album How I Got Over. In an open letter to the National Academy of Recording Arts and Sciences published by the Huffington Post, Shapter includes his musical short film alongside his assertion that The Roots' album How I Got Over should be considered the best album of 2010.

=== Photography ===
Shapter's interest in photography began when he was 12 years old when he was gifted a Canon AE-1 as he accompanied his father and stepmother on their honeymoon. In 1998, Shapter began to establish himself as specialist in fashion photography, garnering work in major markets including Barcelona, London, New York and Los Angeles. The turning point in Shapter's career was a South by Southwest photography gig for MTV. Shapter was twice voted "Best Photographer" by the readers of the Austin Chronicle. According to the Austin Chronicle, Shapter's work "...has brought international attention to our style scene and accolades for his moody, stylish creations."

== Current and future projects ==
Shapter is currently writing and directing a documentary, Porvenir, Texas, centered around the border massacre at Porvenir, during which fifteen Mexican Americans were killed by the Texas Rangers. The documentary will explore the actual events of the 1918 massacre through interviews, an archaeological dig, forensic analysis, and a reenactment of the massacre. Shapter first learned of the Porvenir Massacre in a chapter from Texas State University classmate and author E. R. Bills' book, Texas Obscurities: Stories of the Peculiar, Exceptional and Nefarious (History Press, 2013).

Shapter plans to follow up this documentary with a feature film, Porvenir, based on the massacre as well. Porvenir will follow a young Latina grad student as she stumbles across a century-old controversy on the border.

== Personal life ==
Shapter lived in his adopted hometown Austin, Texas with his wife Christina, daughter Faron West, and son William Ford.

=== Illness and death ===
Shapter underwent radiotherapy for almost two years and chemotherapy to treat squamous cell carcinoma. Two tumors were treated – one in his neck and one in his back. After five surgeries, he lost "part of his ear, a rhomboid muscle, and 33 lymph nodes" resulting in him being declared cancer-free. However, the cancer later returned and he died on February 23, 2019.
