= The Teller and the Truth =

- Directed by: Andrew Shapter
- Written by: Andrew Shapter, Nevie Owens, Patty Moynahan
- Cinematography: Josh Marr, Andrew Shapter
- Edited by: Nevie Owens, Andrew Shapter
- Music by: Carl Thiel
- Release date: November 1, 2015 (Austin Film Festival)
- Running time: 86 minutes
- Country: United States
- Language: English

The Teller and the Truth is an American docudrama about the disappearance of bank teller Francis Wetherbee. The Teller and the Truth is directed, co-written, and co-edited by Andrew Shapter, and was shot over a period of five years, in part, while Shapter underwent radiation and chemotherapy.

The Teller and the Truth held its world premiere at the Austin Film Festival on November 1, 2015, and was distributed by Filmbuff. The Teller and the Truth premiered on iTunes and Amazon on March 1, 2016.

== Plot ==
The film explores the story of bank teller Francis Wetherbee, who disappeared in 1974 during a bank robbery in Smithville, Texas. A few days after her disappearance Smithville Police recovered her car from the bottom of a river but found no other clues as to her whereabouts. Some 40 years after Francis Wetherbee vanished, her disappearance is reexamined as major individuals from her life come forward with new theories and evidence.
