= Hollywood Screenwriter Award =

Former annual US film award

The Hollywood Screenwriter Award is a category of the Hollywood Film Festival held annually since 2002.

== Winners ==
Year	Winner	Film
2002	Robert Towne	
2003	Ron Bass	
2004	John Logan	The Aviator
2005	Akiva Goldsman and Cliff Hollingsworth	Cinderella Man
2006	Eric Roth	The Good Shepard
2007	Christopher Hampton	Atonement
2008	John Patrick Shanley	Doubt
2009	Nora Ephron	Julie & Julia
2010	Aaron Sorkin	The Social Network
2011	Diablo Cody	Young Adult
2012	Quentin Tarantino	Django Unchained
2013	Richard Linklater, Ethan Hawke, and Julie Delpy	Before Midnight
2014	Gillian Flynn	Gone Girl
2012	Tom McCarthy and Josh Singer	Spotlight
2016	Kenneth Lonergan	Manchester by the Sea
2017	Scott Neustadter and Michael H. Weber	The Disaster Artist
2018	Nick Vallelonga, Brian Hayes Currie, and Peter Farrelly	Green Book
2019	Anthony McCarten	The Two Popes
