= Silver Condor Award for Best Foreign Film =

Award for best foreign film presented by the Argentine Film Critics Association

The Silver Condor Award for Best Foreign Film (Spanish: Mejor Película en Lengua Extranjera), presented by the Argentine Film Critics Association, honors the best foreign-language film of the year.

Year	Film	Director	Country
2019	Cold War	Paweł Pawlikowski	Poland
2018	The Other Side of Hope; Manchester by the Sea	Aki Kaurismäki; Kenneth Lonergan	Finland; United States
2017	Carol	Todd Haynes	United Kingdom United States
2016	Two Days, One Night	Jean-Pierre Dardenne and Luc Dardenne	Belgium
2015	Ida	Paweł Pawlikowski	Poland
2014	Blue Jasmine	Woody Allen	United States
2013	A Separation	Asghar Farhadi	Iran
2012	Of Gods and Men	Xavier Beauvois	France
2011	The Beaches of Agnès	Agnès Varda	France
2010	The Class	Laurent Cantet	France
2009	Persépolis	Vincent Paronnaud and Marjane Satrapi	France United States
2008	The Lives of Others	Florian Henckel von Donnersmarck	Germany
2007	Little Miss Sunshine	Jonathan Dayton and Valerie Faris	United States
2006	Sideways	Alexander Payne	United States
2005	Spring, Summer, Fall, Winter... and Spring	Kim Ki-duk	South Korea Germany
2004	Russian Ark	Alexander Sokurov	Russia
2003	Talk To Her	Pedro Almodóvar	Spain
2002	In the Mood for Love	Wong Kar-wai	Hong Kong
2001	Amores perros	Alejandro González Iñárritu	Mexico
2000	Central Station	Walter Salles	Brazil
1999	Ulysses' Gaze	Theo Angelopoulos	Greece
1998	Smoke	Wayne Wang	United States
1997	Before the Rain	Milcho Manchevski	North Macedonia United Kingdom France
1996	Il Postino: The Postman	Michael Radford	France Italy Belgium
1995	Strawberry and Chocolate	Tomás Gutiérrez Alea and Juan Carlos Tabío	Cuba
1994	The Piano	Jane Campion	New Zealand
1993	Raise the Red Lantern	Zhang Yimou	China
1992	Ju Dou	Zhang Yimou	China
1991	Cinema Paradiso	Giuseppe Tornatore	Italy
1990	Babette's Feast	Gabriel Axel	Denmark
1970	Fists in the Pocket	Marco Bellocchio	Italy
1956	Comedians	Juan Antonio Bardem	Spain Argentina
1946	A Song to Remember	Charles Vidor	United States
1945	Going My Way	Leo McCarey	United Kingdom
1944	In Which We Serve	Noël Coward and David Lean	United States
1943	How Green Was My Valley	John Ford	United States
