= List of Ethan Hawke performances =

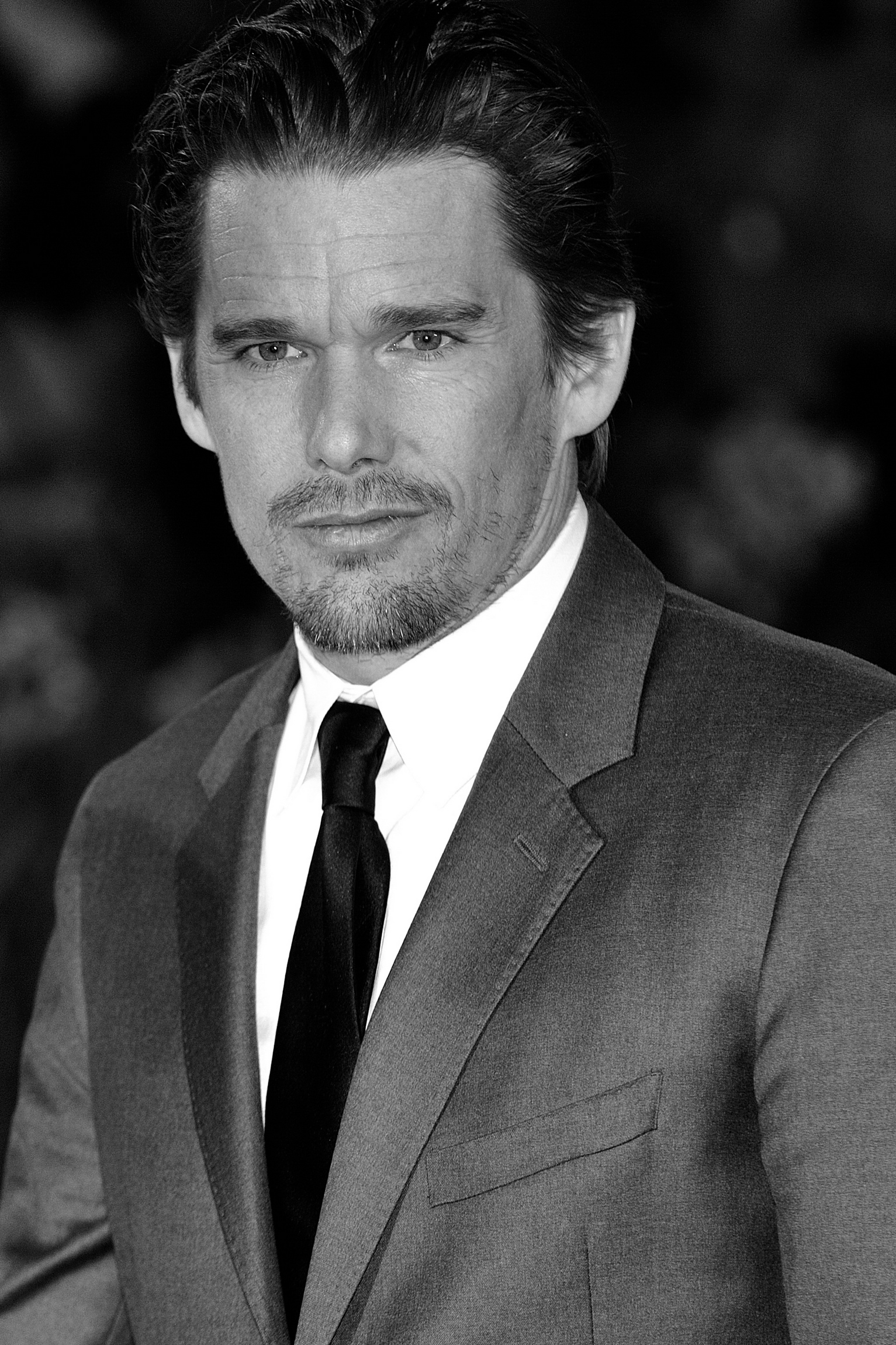
Hawke in September 2009

American actor, film director and author Ethan Hawke made his debut in 1985 with the science fantasy film Explorers (1985). He then had his breakthrough performance in the 1989 drama film Dead Poets Society opposite Robin Williams. He starred in the 1990s films White Fang (1991) and its sequel (1994); Reality Bites with Winona Ryder (1994), Gattaca with Uma Thurman (1997), and Great Expectations with Gwyneth Paltrow (1998). He co-starred alongside Julie Delpy in Richard Linklater's Before trilogy: Before Sunrise (1995), Before Sunset (2004), and Before Midnight (2013). He and Delpy also co-wrote the screenplay with Linklater for the last two films.

During the 2000s, Hawke starred in numerous blockbuster films including Training Day opposite Denzel Washington (2001), Taking Lives with Angelina Jolie (2004), Lord of War with Nicolas Cage (2005), Before the Devil Knows You're Dead with Philip Seymour Hoffman (2007), and Brooklyn's Finest with Richard Gere (2009). He co-starred, wrote and directed the 2006 film The Hottest State, based on his 1996 novel of the same name. In 2012, Hawke starred in the supernatural horror film Sinister (2012) and the next year he starred in The Purge with Lena Headey, the first installment in The Purge franchise. He teamed up again with Linklater for the film Boyhood, which was released in 2014 but production began in 2002 and finished in 2013, with Linklater's goal to make a film about growing up. Hawke played Mason Evans Sr., the father to the main character. The following years, Hawke co-starred in the films Maggie's Plan (2015), Born to Be Blue (2015), The Magnificent Seven (2016), Valerian and the City of a Thousand Planets (2017), First Reformed (2017), Juliet, Naked (2018), The Black Phone (2021) and The Northman (2022).

Hawke created, co-wrote and starred as John Brown in the Showtime limited series The Good Lord Bird (2018), and directed the HBO Max documentary series The Last Movie Stars (2022). He starred in the Marvel television miniseries Moon Knight (2022) as Arthur Harrow.

In addition to his film work, Hawke has appeared in many theater productions, making his Broadway debut in 1992 in Anton Chekhov's The Seagull, and was nominated for a Tony Award for Best Featured Actor in a Play in 2007 for his performance in Tom Stoppard's The Coast of Utopia. In 2010, Hawke directed Sam Shepard's A Lie of the Mind, for which he received a Drama Desk Award nomination for Outstanding Director of a Play. In 2018, he starred in the Roundabout Theater Company's revival of Sam Shepard's play True West alongside Paul Dano.

== Film ==
Year	Title	Role	Notes	Ref.
1985	Explorers	Ben Crandall		
1988	Lion's Den	Chris	Short film	
1989	Dead Poets Society	Todd Anderson		
1989	Dad	Billy Tremont		
1991	White Fang	Jack Conroy		
1991	Mystery Date	Tom McHugh		
1992	Waterland	Mathew Price		
1992	A Midnight Clear	Will Knott		
1993	Rich in Love	Wayne Frobiness		
1993	Alive	Nando Parrado		
1994	Straight to One	—N/a	Short film; writer, director and producer only	
1994	Quiz Show	Don Quixote student	Uncredited cameo	
1994	Reality Bites	Troy Dyer		
1994	Floundering	Jimmy		
1994	White Fang 2: Myth of the White Wolf	Jack Conroy	Uncredited cameo	
1995	Before Sunrise	Jesse Wallace		
1995	Search and Destroy	Roger		
1997	Gattaca	Vincent Freeman		
1998	Great Expectations	Finnegan 'Finn' Bell		
1998	The Newton Boys	Jess Newton		
1999	The Velocity of Gary	Nat		
1999	Joe the King	Len Coles		
1999	Snow Falling on Cedars	Ishmael Chambers		
2000	Hamlet	Hamlet		
2001	Waking Life	Jesse Wallace		
2001	Tape	Vince		
2001	Training Day	Officer Jake Hoyt		
2001	Chelsea Walls	Sam (voice)	Uncredited; also director	
2002	The Jimmy Show	Ray		
2004	Taking Lives	Martin Asher / James Costa		
2004	Before Sunset	Jesse Wallace	Also writer	
2005	Assault on Precinct 13	Sergeant Jake Roenick		
2005	Lord of War	ATF Agent Jack Valentine		
2005	One Last Thing...	Earl Jameison	Uncredited cameo	
2006	The Hottest State	Vince	Also writer and director	
2006	Fast Food Nation	Pete		
2007	Before the Devil Knows You're Dead	Hank Hanson		
2008	What Doesn't Kill You	Paulie McDougan		
2008	Chelsea on the Rocks	Himself	Documentary	
2008	New York, I Love You	Writer		
2009	Brooklyn's Finest	Detective Sal Procida		
2009	Staten Island	'Sully' Halverson		
2009	Corso: The Last Beat	Narrator / Himself	Documentary	
2009	Daybreakers	Edward Dalton		
2011	The Woman in the Fifth	Tom Ricks		
2012	Total Recall	Carl Hauser	Director's cut only	
2012	Sinister	Ellison Oswalt		
2012	Mea Maxima Culpa: Silence in the House of God	Pat (voice)	Documentary	
2013	Before Midnight	Jesse Wallace	Also writer	
2013	The Purge	James Sandin		
2013	Getaway	Brent Magna		
2014	Boyhood	Mason Evans Sr.		
2014	Predestination	Agent Doe		
2014	Cymbeline	Iachimo		
2014	Good Kill	Major Tommy Egan		
2014	Seymour: An Introduction	Himself	Documentary; also director	
2015	Ten Thousand Saints	Les Keffy		
2015	Maggie's Plan	John Harding		
2015	Born to Be Blue	Chet Baker		
2015	Regression	Bruce Kenner		
2016	In a Valley of Violence	Paul		
2016	The Phenom	Hopper Gibson Sr.		
2016	Invasion!	Cosmos (voice)	Short film	
2016	Maudie	Everett Lewis		
2016	The Magnificent Seven	'Goodnight' Robicheaux		
2017	Valerian and the City of a Thousand Planets	'Jolly' The Pimp		
2017	First Reformed	Reverend Ernst Toller		
2017	24 Hours to Live	Travis Conrad		
2017	Dying of the Light	Narrator	Uncredited	
2018	Juliet, Naked	Tucker Crowe		
2018	Blaze	Radio DJ	Cameo; also writer, director and producer	
2018	Stockholm	Kaj Hansson / Lars Nystrom		
2019	The Kid	Pat Garrett		
2019	Adopt a Highway	Russell Millings	Also producer	
2019	The Truth	Hank		
2020	Tesla	Nikola Tesla		
2020	Cut Throat City	Jackson Symms		
2021	Zeros and Ones	JJ		
2021	The Guilty	Sergeant Bill Miller (voice)		
2021	The Black Phone	The Grabber		
2022	The Northman	King Aurvandill		
2022	Glass Onion: A Knives Out Mystery	Efficient Man	Cameo	
2022	Raymond & Ray	Ray		
2023	Strange Way of Life	Jake	Short film	
2023	Wildcat	—N/a	Writer, director and producer only	
2023	Leave the World Behind	Clay Sandford		
2025	Blue Moon	Lorenz Hart		
2025	She Dances	Brian		
2025	Highway 99: A Double Album	—N/a	Documentary; director and producer only	
2025	Black Phone 2	The Grabber		
2026	The Weight	Samuel Murphy		
2026	I, Object	Little Ben		

Key
†	Denotes films that have not yet been released

== Television ==
Year	Title	Role	Notes	Ref.
2003	Alias	CIA Agent James L. Lennox	Episode: "Double Agent"	
2007	Robot Chicken	Godzilla Junior / Jason (voice)	Episode: "Squaw Bury Shortcake"	
2011	Moby Dick	Starbuck	Miniseries	
2019	The Purge	James Sandin	Episode: "7:01am"	
2020	The Good Lord Bird	John Brown	Lead role; also creator, writer and executive producer	
2022	Moon Knight	Arthur Harrow	Main role	
2022	The Last Movie Stars	Himself	Documentary series; also director	
2022–present	Batwheels	Batman (voice)	Main role	
2023	Reservation Dogs	Rick Miller	Episode: "Elora's Dad"	
2025–present	The Lowdown	Lee Raybon	Main role; also executive producer	
2025	Vietnam: The War That Changed America	Narrator (voice)	Documentary series	
2025	The American Revolution	General Anthony Wayne (voice)	Documentary series	

== Theater ==
Year	Title	Role	Venue	Notes	Ref.
1991	Casanova	Young Giacomo Casanova	The Public Theater		
1992–1993	The Seagull	Konstantin Treplev	Lyceum Theatre		
1993	Sophistry	Xavier 'Ex' Reynolds	Playwrights Horizons		
1999	Camino Real	Kilroy	Williamstown Theatre Festival		
2001	The Late Henry Moss	Ray Moss	Peter Norton Space		
2003–2004	Henry IV	Henry Percy	Vivian Beaumont Theater, Broadway		
2005	Hurlyburly	Eddie	Acorn Theatre		
2006–2007	The Coast of Utopia	Mikhail Bakunin	Vivian Beaumont Theater, Broadway		
2007	Things We Want	—N/a	Acorn Theatre	Director only	
2009	The Cherry Orchard	Peter Trofimov	BAM Harvey Theater		
2009	The Winter's Tale	Autolycus	The Old Vic / International tour		
2010	A Lie of the Mind	—N/a	Acorn Theatre	Director only	
2011	Blood From a Stone	Travis	Acorn Theatre		
2012	Ivanov	Nikolai Ivanov	Classic Stage Company		
2013	Clive	Clive	Acorn Theatre	Also director	
2013–2014	Macbeth	Macbeth	Vivian Beaumont Theater, Broadway		
2019	True West	Lee	American Airlines Theatre, Broadway		

== Music videos ==
Year	Title	Artist	Ref.
2024	"Fortnight"	Taylor Swift ft. Post Malone	

== Podcasts ==
Year	Title	Role
2026	Midnight Radio	Radio Man

== See also ==
- List of awards and nominations received by Ethan Hawke
