= List of awards and nominations received by Ethan Hawke =

Ethan Hawke awards and nominations
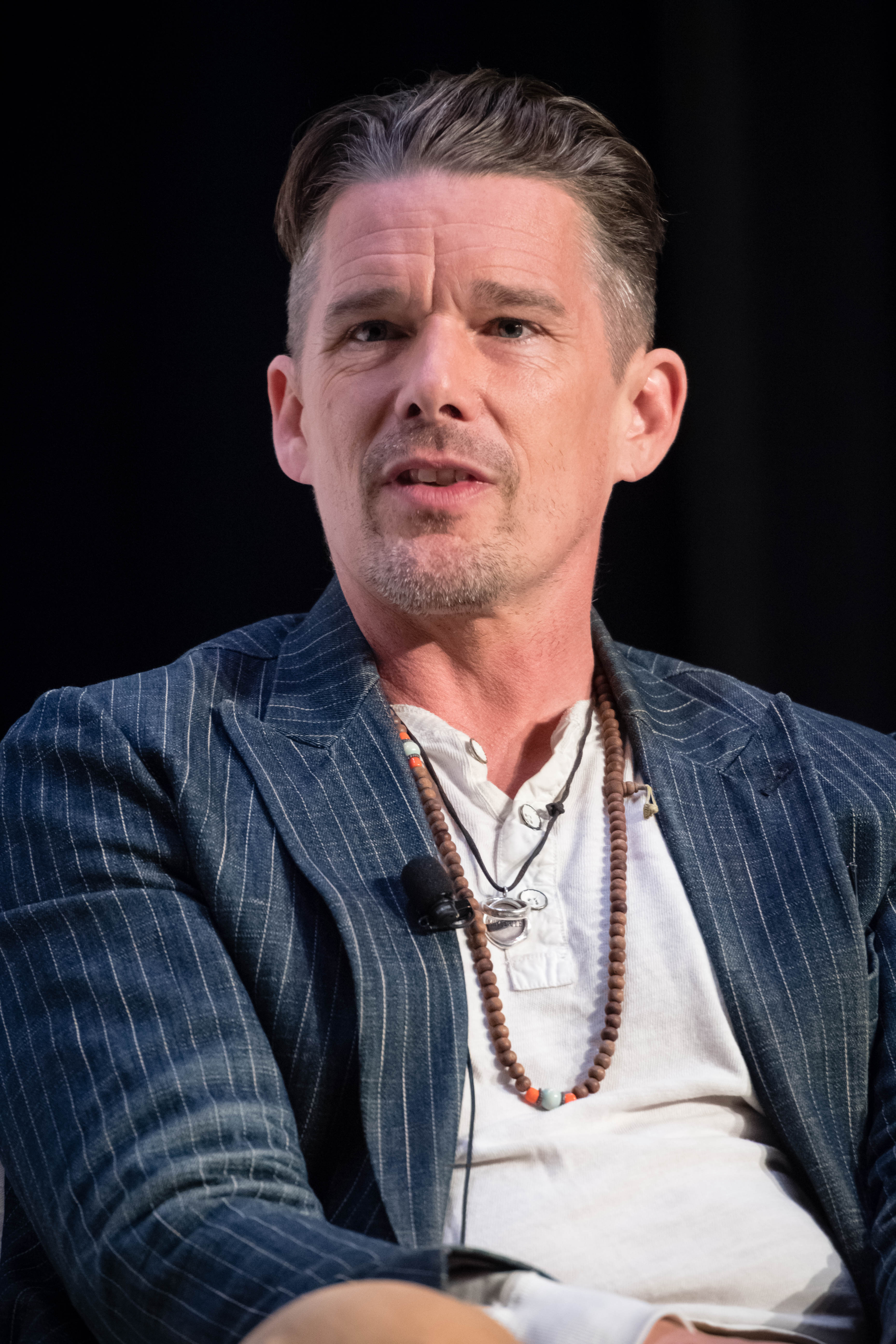
- Hawke at the 2018 Montclair Film Festival
Awards and nominations
Award	Wins	Nominations
Academy Awards	0	5
Actor Awards	0	5
BAFTA Awards	0	2
Daytime Emmy Awards	1	1
Golden Globes	0	3
Tony Awards	0	1

Totals (Note: Certain award groups do not simply award one winner. They acknowledge several different recipients, have runners-up, and have third place. Since this is a specific recognition and is different from losing an award, runner-up mentions are considered wins in this award tally. For simplification and to avoid errors, each award in this list has been presumed to have had a prior nomination.)
- Wins: 71
- Nominations: 195

Ethan Hawke is an American actor, writer and director who has received various awards and nominations throughout his career.

Hawke has been nominated for five Academy Awards, receiving two nominations for Best Adapted Screenplay thanks to his writing contributions in Before Sunset (2004) and its sequel Before Midnight (2013), two nominations for Best Supporting Actor for his performances in the films Training Day (2001) and Boyhood (2014), and a nomination for Best Actor for Blue Moon (2025). The Before trilogy also earned him nominations at the Critics' Choice Awards, Film Independent Spirit Awards, and Writers Guild of America Awards, while the coming-of-age drama Boyhood garnered him further nominations for Best Supporting Actor at the Actor Awards, British Academy Film Awards (BAFTA), and Golden Globe Awards.

In 2018, he received critical acclaim for his performance as a Protestant minister in Paul Schrader's drama First Reformed, winning the Independent Spirit Award for Best Male Lead and being honored by several critics associations, including the "critics trifecta": the Los Angeles Film Critics Association, the National Society of Film Critics, and the New York Film Critics Circle. His portrayal of lyricist Lorenz Hart in Richard Linklater's comedy-drama Blue Moon earned him Best Actor nominations at the Actor Awards, BAFTA Awards, and Golden Globe Awards.

In addition to his film work, Hawke has appeared in television series including The Good Lord Bird (2020), which earned him nominations for an Actor Award, a Golden Globe Award, and a Writers Guild of America Award, and took part in the 2006 Broadway debut of Tom Stoppard's play The Coast of Utopia, receiving a nomination for the Tony Award for Best Featured Actor in a Play.

== Awards and nominations ==
Awards and nominations received by Ethan Hawke
Award	Year	Nominated work	Category	Result	Ref.
Academy Awards	2002	Training Day	Best Supporting Actor	Nominated	
Academy Awards	2005	Before Sunset	Best Adapted Screenplay (Note: shared with Julie Delpy, Kim Krizan, and Richard Linklater)	Nominated	
Academy Awards	2014	Before Midnight	Best Adapted Screenplay (Note: shared with Julie Delpy and Richard Linklater)	Nominated	
Academy Awards	2015	Boyhood	Best Supporting Actor	Nominated	
Academy Awards	2026	Blue Moon	Best Actor	Nominated	
Actor Awards	2002	Training Day	Outstanding Male Actor in a Supporting Role	Nominated	
Actor Awards	2015	Boyhood	Outstanding Male Actor in a Supporting Role	Nominated	
Actor Awards	2015	Boyhood	Outstanding Cast in a Motion Picture (Note: shared with the cast)	Nominated	
Actor Awards	2021	The Good Lord Bird	Outstanding Male Actor in a Miniseries or Television Movie	Nominated	
Actor Awards	2026	Blue Moon	Outstanding Male Actor in a Leading Role	Nominated	
AWFJ EDA Awards	2019	First Reformed	Best Actor	Won	
AWFJ EDA Awards	2025	Blue Moon	Best Actor	Nominated	
AARP Movies for Grownups Awards	2014	Before Midnight	Best Screenwriter	Won	
AARP Movies for Grownups Awards	2014	Before Midnight	Best Grownup Love Story (Note: shared with Julie Delpy)	Nominated	
AARP Movies for Grownups Awards	2021	The Good Lord Bird	Best Actor (TV/Streaming)	Nominated	
AARP Movies for Grownups Awards	2026	Blue Moon	Best Actor	Nominated	
Astra Film Awards	2018	First Reformed	Best Actor	Nominated	
Astra Film Awards	2026	Black Phone 2	Best Performance in a Horror or Thriller	Nominated	
Astra Midseason Movie Awards	2018	First Reformed	Best Actor	Won	
Astra TV Awards	2022	Moon Knight	Best Supporting Actor in a Streaming Limited or Anthology Series or Movie	Nominated	
Austin Film Critics Association Awards	2019	First Reformed	Best Actor	Won	
Austin Film Critics Association Awards	2025	Blue Moon	Best Actor	Nominated	
AACTA International Awards	2015	Boyhood	Best Supporting Actor	Nominated	
Boston Online Film Critics Association Awards	2013	Before Midnight	Best Screenplay	Won	
Boston Online Film Critics Association Awards	2018	First Reformed	Best Actor	Won	
Boston Society of Film Critics Awards	2014	Boyhood	Best Cast	Won	
Boston Society of Film Critics Awards	2018	First Reformed	Best Actor	Runner-up	
Boston Society of Film Critics Awards	2025	Blue Moon	Best Actor	Won	
British Academy Film Awards	2015	Boyhood	Best Actor in a Supporting Role	Nominated	
British Academy Film Awards	2026	Blue Moon	Best Actor in a Leading Role	Nominated	
Canadian Screen Awards	2018	Maudie	Best Supporting Actor	Won	
Cannes Film Festival Awards	2001	Chelsea Walls	Caméra d'Or	Nominated	
Chicago Film Critics Association Awards	2013	Before Midnight	Best Adapted Screenplay	Nominated	
Chicago Film Critics Association Awards	2014	Boyhood	Best Supporting Actor	Nominated	
Chicago Film Critics Association Awards	2018	First Reformed	Best Actor	Won	
Chicago Film Critics Association Awards	2025	Blue Moon	Best Actor	Nominated	
Chlotrudis Awards	2015	Boyhood	Best Supporting Actor	Nominated	
Chlotrudis Awards	2018	Maudie	Best Actor	Nominated	
Chlotrudis Awards	2019	First Reformed	Best Actor	Nominated	
Critics' Choice Awards	2008	Before the Devil Knows You're Dead	Best Acting Ensemble	Nominated	
Critics' Choice Awards	2014	Before Midnight	Best Adapted Screenplay	Nominated	
Critics' Choice Awards	2014	The Before Trilogy	Louis XIII Genius Award	Won	
Critics' Choice Awards	2015	Boyhood	Best Supporting Actor	Nominated	
Critics' Choice Awards	2015	Boyhood	Best Acting Ensemble	Nominated	
Critics' Choice Awards	2019	First Reformed	Best Actor	Nominated	
Critics' Choice Awards	2026	Blue Moon	Best Actor	Nominated	
Critics' Choice Super Awards	2023	The Black Phone	Best Actor in a Horror Movie	Nominated	
Critics' Choice Super Awards	2023	Moon Knight	Best Villain in a Series	Nominated	
Critics' Choice Super Awards	2026	The Lowdown	Best Actor in an Action Series	Nominated	
Dallas–Fort Worth Film Critics Association Awards	2014	Boyhood	Best Supporting Actor	Nominated	
Dallas–Fort Worth Film Critics Association Awards	2018	First Reformed	Best Actor	Nominated	
Dallas–Fort Worth Film Critics Association Awards	2025	Blue Moon	Best Actor	Nominated	
Daytime Emmy Awards	2017	Invasion!	Outstanding Interactive – Original Daytime Content (Note: shared with the creators of the program)	Won	
Detroit Film Critics Society Awards	2007	Before the Devil Knows You're Dead	Best Ensemble	Nominated	
Detroit Film Critics Society Awards	2013	Before Midnight	Best Screenplay	Nominated	
Detroit Film Critics Society Awards	2014	Boyhood	Best Supporting Actor	Nominated	
Detroit Film Critics Society Awards	2014	Boyhood	Best Ensemble	Nominated	
Detroit Film Critics Society Awards	2018	First Reformed	Best Actor	Won	
Dorian Awards	2019	First Reformed	Film Performance of the Year — Actor	Won	
Dorian Awards	2026	Blue Moon	Film Performance of the Year	Nominated	
Dorian Awards	2026	The Lowdown	Best TV Performance – Comedy	Nominated	
Drama Desk Awards	2009	The Winter's Tale	Outstanding Featured Actor in a Play	Nominated	
Drama Desk Awards	2010	A Lie of the Mind	Outstanding Director of a Play	Nominated	
Drama League Awards	2019	True West	Distinguished Performance	Nominated	
Dublin Film Critics' Circle Awards	2014	Before Midnight	Best Actor	Nominated	
Dublin Film Critics' Circle Awards	2014	Before Midnight	Best Screenplay	Won	
Dublin Film Critics' Circle Awards	2019	First Reformed	Best Actor	Nominated	
Fangoria Chainsaw Awards	2013	Sinister	Best Actor	Nominated	
Fangoria Chainsaw Awards	2023	The Black Phone	Best Supporting Performance	Nominated	
Film Independent Spirit Awards	2005	Before Sunset	Best Screenplay	Nominated	
Film Independent Spirit Awards	2014	Before Midnight	Best Screenplay	Nominated	
Film Independent Spirit Awards	2016	Boyhood	Best Supporting Male	Nominated	
Film Independent Spirit Awards	2019	First Reformed	Best Male Lead	Won	
Film Independent Spirit Awards	2026	The Lowdown	Best Lead Performance in a New Scripted Series	Nominated	
Florida Film Critics Circle Awards	2014	Boyhood	Best Cast	Runner-up	
Florida Film Critics Circle Awards	2018	First Reformed	Best Actor	Nominated	
Georgia Film Critics Association Awards	2015	Boyhood	Best Supporting Actor	Nominated	
Georgia Film Critics Association Awards	2015	Boyhood	Best Ensemble	Nominated	
Georgia Film Critics Association Awards	2019	First Reformed	Best Actor	Won	
Georgia Film Critics Association Awards	2025	Blue Moon	Best Actor	Nominated	
Golden Globes	2015	Boyhood	Best Supporting Actor – Motion Picture	Nominated	
Golden Globes	2021	The Good Lord Bird	Best Actor – Miniseries or Television Film	Nominated	
Golden Globes	2026	Blue Moon	Best Actor in a Motion Picture – Musical or Comedy	Nominated	
Gotham Awards	2002	Chelsea Walls	Open Palm Award	Nominated	
Gotham Awards	2007	Before the Devil Knows You're Dead	Best Ensemble Cast	Won	
Gotham Awards	2014	Boyhood	Best Actor	Nominated	
Gotham Awards	2016	Himself	Gotham Tribute	Won	
Gotham Awards	2018	First Reformed	Best Actor	Won	
Gotham Awards	2021	The Good Lord Bird	Breakthrough Series – Long Form (Note: shared with the executive producers of the series)	Nominated	
Gotham Awards	2021	The Good Lord Bird	Outstanding Performance in a New Series	Won	
Gotham Awards	2022	The Last Movie Stars	Breakthrough Nonfiction Series (Note: shared with the producers of the documentary series)	Nominated	
Gotham Awards	2025	Blue Moon	Outstanding Lead Performance	Nominated	
Hollywood Film Awards	2013	Before Midnight	Hollywood Screenwriter Award	Won	
Houston Film Critics Society Awards	2013	Before Midnight	Best Screenplay	Nominated	
Houston Film Critics Society Awards	2015	Boyhood	Best Supporting Actor	Nominated	
Houston Film Critics Society Awards	2019	First Reformed	Best Actor	Nominated	
Houston Film Critics Society Awards	2026	Blue Moon	Best Actor	Nominated	
IndieWire Critics Poll Awards	2013	Before Midnight	Best Screenplay	Won	
IndieWire Critics Poll Awards	2014	Boyhood	Best Supporting Actor	Nominated	
IndieWire Critics Poll Awards	2016	Born to Be Blue	Best Actor	Nominated	
IndieWire Critics Poll Awards	2018	First Reformed	Best Actor	Won	
IndieWire Critics Poll Awards	2025	Blue Moon	Best Performance	Runner-up	
International Adana Film Festival Awards	2018	Blaze	International Feature Film	Nominated	
International Cinephile Society Awards	2014	Before Midnight	Best Adapted Screenplay	Runner-up	
International Cinephile Society Awards	2019	First Reformed	Best Actor	Runner-up	
International Cinephile Society Awards	2026	Blue Moon	Best Actor	Nominated	
Irish Film & Television Awards	2018	Maudie	Best International Actor	Won	
Irish Film & Television Awards	2026	Blue Moon	Best International Actor	Nominated	
Kansas City Film Critics Circle Awards	2018	First Reformed	Best Actor (Note: tied with Christian Bale for Vice)	Won	
Kansas City Film Critics Circle Awards	2025	Blue Moon	Best Actor	Nominated	
Karlovy Vary International Film Festival Awards	2021	Himself	Festival President's Award	Won	
Las Vegas Film Critics Society Awards	2018	First Reformed	Best Actor	Won	
Locarno International Film Festival Awards	2018	Himself	Excellence Award	Won	
London Film Critics' Circle Awards	2015	Boyhood	Supporting Actor of the Year	Nominated	
London Film Critics' Circle Awards	2019	First Reformed	Actor of the Year	Won	
London Film Critics' Circle Awards	2026	Blue Moon	Actor of the Year	Nominated	
Los Angeles Film Critics Association Awards	2013	Before Midnight	Best Screenplay	Won	
Los Angeles Film Critics Association Awards	2018	First Reformed	Best Actor	Won	
Los Angeles Film Critics Association Awards	2025	Blue Moon	Best Lead Performance	Won	
Lucille Lortel Awards	2005	Hurlyburly	Outstanding Lead Actor in a Play	Nominated	
Method Fest Independent Film Festival Awards	2019	Stockholm	Best Actor	Won	
MTV Movie & TV Awards	1994	Reality Bites	Best Kiss (Note: shared with Winona Ryder)	Nominated	
MTV Movie & TV Awards	1995	Before Sunrise	Best Kiss	Nominated	
MTV Movie & TV Awards	2014	The Purge	Best Scared-As-Shit Performance	Nominated	
National Society of Film Critics Awards	2005	Before Sunset	Best Screenplay	Nominated	
National Society of Film Critics Awards	2014	Before Midnight	Best Screenplay	Won	
National Society of Film Critics Awards	2019	First Reformed	Best Actor	Won	
National Society of Film Critics Awards	2026	Blue Moon	Best Actor	Won	
New York Film Critics Circle Awards	2018	First Reformed	Best Actor	Won	
New York Film Critics Online Awards	2018	First Reformed	Best Actor	Won	
New York Film Critics Online Awards	2025	Blue Moon	Best Actor	Won	
Obie Awards	2011	Blood from a Stone	Distinguished Performance by an Actor	Won	
Online Film Critics Society Awards	2005	Before Sunset	Best Adapted Screenplay	Nominated	
Online Film Critics Society Awards	2013	Before Midnight	Best Adapted Screenplay	Nominated	
Online Film Critics Society Awards	2014	Boyhood	Best Supporting Actor	Nominated	
Online Film Critics Society Awards	2019	First Reformed	Best Actor	Won	
Online Film Critics Society Awards	2026	Blue Moon	Best Actor	Nominated	
Phoenix Film Critics Society Awards	2014	Boyhood	Best Supporting Actor	Nominated	
St. Louis Film Critics Association Awards	2013	Before Midnight	Best Adapted Screenplay	Nominated	
St. Louis Film Critics Association Awards	2014	Boyhood	Best Supporting Actor	Nominated	
St. Louis Film Critics Association Awards	2018	First Reformed	Best Actor	Won	
St. Louis Film Critics Association Awards	2025	Blue Moon	Best Actor	Nominated	
San Diego Film Critics Society Awards	2013	Before Midnight	Best Adapted Screenplay	Won	
San Diego Film Critics Society Awards	2014	Boyhood	Best Supporting Actor	Nominated	
San Diego Film Critics Society Awards	2014	Boyhood	Best Performance by an Ensemble	Nominated	
San Diego Film Critics Society Awards	2017	Maudie	Best Supporting Actor	Nominated	
San Diego Film Critics Society Awards	2018	First Reformed	Best Actor	Won	
San Diego Film Critics Society Awards	2023	The Black Phone; Glass Onion: A Knives Out Mystery; The Northman; Raymond & Ray	Special Award for Body of Work	Runner-up	
San Francisco Bay Area Film Critics Circle Awards	2013	Before Midnight	Best Adapted Screenplay	Nominated	
San Francisco Bay Area Film Critics Circle Awards	2014	Boyhood	Best Supporting Actor	Nominated	
San Francisco Bay Area Film Critics Circle Awards	2018	First Reformed	Best Actor	Won	
San Francisco Bay Area Film Critics Circle Awards	2025	Blue Moon	Best Actor	Won	
San Sebastián International Film Festival Awards	2016	Himself	Donostia Award	Won	
Santa Barbara International Film Festival Awards	2015	Himself	American Riviera Award	Won	
Santa Barbara International Film Festival Awards	2026	Himself	American Riviera Award	Won	
Satellite Awards	2007	Before the Devil Knows You're Dead	Best Cast – Motion Picture	Won	
Satellite Awards	2014	Before Midnight	Best Adapted Screenplay	Nominated	
Satellite Awards	2015	Boyhood	Best Supporting Actor – Motion Picture	Nominated	
Satellite Awards	2015	"Split the Difference" (from Boyhood)	Best Original Song	Nominated	
Satellite Awards	2019	First Reformed	Best Actor in a Motion Picture – Drama	Nominated	
Satellite Awards	2019	The Good Lord Bird	Best Actor – Miniseries or Television Film	Won	
Satellite Awards	2019	The Good Lord Bird	Best Cast – Television Series	Won	
Satellite Awards	2026	Blue Moon	Best Actor in a Motion Picture – Musical or Comedy	Nominated	
Saturn Awards	2022	The Black Phone	Best Supporting Actor in a Film	Nominated	
Saturn Awards	2022	Moon Knight	Best Supporting Actor in a Streaming Series	Nominated	
SCAD Savannah Film Festival Awards	2026	—	Outstanding Collaboration in Television Award (Note: shared with Sterlin Harjo)	Won	
Seattle Film Critics Society Awards	2018	First Reformed	Best Actor	Won	
Seattle Film Critics Society Awards	2025	Blue Moon	Best Actor	Nominated	
Seattle International Film Festival Awards	2018	First Reformed	Golden Space Needle Award for Best Actor	Nominated	
Seattle International Film Festival Awards	2018	Himself	Outstanding Achievement Award in Cinema	Won	
Southeastern Film Critics Association Awards	2018	First Reformed	Best Actor	Won	
Southeastern Film Critics Association Awards	2025	Blue Moon	Best Actor	Runner-up	
Sundance Film Festival Awards	2018	Blaze	Grand Jury Prize	Nominated	
TCA Awards	2021	The Good Lord Bird	Individual Achievement in Drama	Nominated	
Tony Awards	2007	The Coast of Utopia	Best Featured Actor in a Play	Nominated	
Toronto Film Critics Association Awards	2013	Before Midnight	Best Screenplay	Runner-up	
Toronto Film Critics Association Awards	2018	First Reformed	Best Actor	Won	
Toronto Film Critics Association Awards	2025	Blue Moon	Outstanding Lead Performance	Won	
Toronto International Film Festival Awards	2014	Seymour: An Introduction	People's Choice Award: Documentaries	Nominated	
USC Scripter Awards	2021	The Good Lord Bird	Episodic Series (Note: shared with Mark Richard)	Nominated	
Vancouver Film Critics Circle Awards	2018	First Reformed	Best Actor	Won	
Village Voice Film Poll Awards	2004	Before Sunset	Best Screenplay	Runner-up	
Village Voice Film Poll Awards	2013	Before Midnight	Best Screenplay	Won	
Village Voice Film Poll Awards	2014	Boyhood	Best Supporting Actor	Nominated	
Washington D.C. Area Film Critics Association Awards	2013	Before Midnight	Best Adapted Screenplay	Nominated	
Washington D.C. Area Film Critics Association Awards	2014	Boyhood	Best Supporting Actor	Nominated	
Washington D.C. Area Film Critics Association Awards	2014	Boyhood	Best Ensemble	Nominated	
Washington D.C. Area Film Critics Association Awards	2018	First Reformed	Best Actor	Nominated	
Washington D.C. Area Film Critics Association Awards	2025	Blue Moon	Best Actor	Nominated	
Women Film Critics Circle Awards	2025	Blue Moon	Best Actor	Won	
Writers Guild of America Awards	2005	Before Sunset	Best Adapted Screenplay	Nominated	
Writers Guild of America Awards	2014	Before Midnight	Best Adapted Screenplay	Nominated	
Writers Guild of America Awards	2021	The Good Lord Bird	Best Adapted Long Form Television (Note: shared with Jeff Augustin, Erika L. Johnson, Mark Richard, Kristen SaBerre, and Lauren Signorino)	Nominated	
Young Artist Awards	1985	Explorers	Best Leading Young Actor in a Feature Film	Nominated	
Young Artist Awards	1990	Dad	Best Supporting Young Actor in a Feature Film	Nominated	
