= Rules for a Knight =

2015 book by Ethan Hawke

- Front cover art
- Author: Ethan Hawke
- Illustrator: Ryan Hawke
- Language: English
- Genre: Historical fiction
- Published: November 10, 2015
- Publisher: Alfred A. Knopf
- Publication place: United States
- Pages: 192
- ISBN: 978-0-307-96233-1

Rules for a Knight is a novel written by Ethan Hawke and illustrated by Ryan Hawke. The story takes place in the 15th century and is written in the form of a letter from the novel's protagonist, Sir Thomas Lemuel Hawke, to his four children. The novel recounts episodes of Sir Hawke's life as a knight and offers advice to the reader on a variety of topics such as love and chivalry.

Hawke has cited his own children and the rules of his home as inspiration for Rules for a Knight. He stated in an interview with The New Yorker, "What has been valuable about [the book] for me was that it gave me an excuse and permission to bring up subject matters that are very difficult to talk about with kids."

The book received some criticism for its "anachronistic nature", but was positively reviewed over all.

Rules for a Knight was published in a hardcover format on November 10, 2015, by Knopf publishing. It received mixed to positive reviews and appeared on The New York Times bestseller list at #12 during the week of December 6, 2015.

== Plot ==
The book is divided into a preface, 20 subsections, and an end poem. Each of the 20 middle sections focuses on a different value or virtue explained in a short tale.

Preface – Thomas addresses a letter to his four children on the eve before a battle, fearing he will not survive it. The preface explains how he came as a young man to be the squire of his grandfather, who once served under King Henry V.

1. Solitude – recounts the telling of the fable of two wolves by Thomas's grandfather.

2. Humility – Thomas remembers a conversation with his grandfather and several other knights on the nature of humbleness, arrogance, and joy.

3. Gratitude – a young Thomas suffers from a toothache and complains constantly, annoying his grandfather. When winter comes, young Hawke complains of the cold. His grandfather reminds him that at least his tooth no longer bothers him.

4. Pride – Young Thomas learns from his grandfather how to shoot a bow and arrow.

5. Cooperation – Young Thomas's grandfather takes on another squire, who outshines Thomas in many tasks. Thomas is plagued by jealousy until the sudden death of the other squire. Upon this tragedy, Thomas realizes that his jealousy of the second squire improved his own skills.

6. Friendship – Thomas meets his best friend, another knight named Sir Richard Hughes.

7. Forgiveness – Thomas remembers walking with his wife and coming upon an angry child. Despite the child's awful behavior, Thomas's wife aids him. This bothers Thomas for hours afterward until his wife remarks, "I set the child down hours ago, but I see you are still carrying him."

8. Honesty – Thomas tells the tale of an archery contest he competed in, in which he lost to a Welshman who cheated.

9. Courage – Thomas and Sir Richard defend a bridge from marauders. Sir Richard overcomes his fear and manages to a light a signal fire by thinking of someone he loves instead of the danger he's in.

10. Grace – Thomas offers advice to his daughters regarding beauty and aging, warning them against conceit. He also recounts a tale in which he and Sir Richard encounter travelers along the road.

11. Patience – Sir Richard experience several instances of luck in succession. He does not celebrate good luck, nor mourn bad luck, but simply waits to see the eventual outcome.

12. Justice – Young Thomas and his grandfather come upon a village which has been upset by a recent number of dead animals floating down a nearby river. Hawke's grandfather suggests that the confused people go upriver to find the source.

13. Generosity – Thomas and Richard encounter people in great poverty, and marvel at the generosity of a starving young boy who shares Hawke's offering of bread with his siblings. Thomas's grandfather is offered a promotion to Bishop, but rejects it in favor of staying with his land and its people.

14. Discipline – A wealthy relative of Thomas's begins to offer gifts to the knights of the area. Thomas's grandfather forces him to return each gift. It is later discovered that their wealthy relative had been planning to raise an army. Each knight who had accepted his gifts felt a sense of loyalty to him, and fought in battle for him. Thomas and his grandfather do not fight, but Sir Richard is killed in battle.

15. Dedication – Thomas recounts the famous battle of Caal, in which the people of Caal escaped thanks to the ingenuity of their knights.

16. Speech – Thomas's grandfather teaches him the value of limited speech.

17. Faith – Thomas remembers a woman who went mad with grief after the loss of her son. Thomas's grandfather designed a task for her so that she might learnt he sorrow of others, allowing her to regain her mind.

18. Equality – Thomas remembers the first time he heard "The Ballad of the Forty-Four-Pointed Red Deer."

19. Love – Thomas recalls falling in love with the Duchess of York, who used him to gain favor with a prince. Distraught, Thomas becomes distracted, and accidentally causes a fire in his house. After his grandfather is injured, he sends for a healer. The healer has died, but her daughter aides Thomas. Thomas falls very slowly in love with healer's daughter, and eventually marries her. He then wishes his children the kind of relationship he has had with their mother.

20. Death – Thomas recounts his grandfather's last days and then ends his letter to his children.

The Ballad of the Forty-Four-Pointed Red Deer – The song mentioned in section 18 is printed in full. Although it is described in section 18 as being very ancient, it was in fact written by Hawke for the book. It tells the story of a buck who negotiates the freedom of all animals from the tyranny of a human king, sacrificing himself in the process.

== Development ==
The original idea for the book came to Hawke about a decade before its publication. It began as rules for his own children and house, and over the years grew into Rules for a Knight. When speaking on the subject in a New Yorker interview, Hawke said, "So we started saying, well, what are the rules of our house? And you start with the really mundane, like eight-o’clock bedtime, all that kind of stuff. And then, invariably, you start asking yourself, well, what do we really believe in?" In the same interview, Hawke discussed the motif of knights and chivalry, saying, "I’ve just always loved the idea of knighthood. It makes being a good person cool. Or, aspiring to be a good person cool."

=== Real life inspiration ===
Hawke has stated that he took some elements of the book's fables from his own life, specifically the fable for Cooperation, which was based on his experiences with River Phoenix.

=== Inspiration from other fables ===
The very first fable in Rules for a Knight, on the subject of solitude, is a retelling of the Native American fable of The Two Wolves.

Several of the fables related in the book bear great resemblance to other classic fables. The fable of forgiveness that Hawke relates in Forgiveness contains a similar situation and nearly identical closing phrase as the Buddhist/Taoist fable of The Two Monks and the Woman.

The tale related in Faith is also very similar to the Buddhist story of Kisa Gotami.

== Adaptations ==
An audiobook of Rules for a Knight has been recorded. It is narrated by actor Alessandro Nivola and runs 2 hrs 15 min. It was published by Brilliance Audio in 2015.

== Reception ==
The book has received mixed to positive reviews. Michael Lindgren of The Washington Post said of Hawke's work, "those who are able to separate the book's wisdom from its author might find a certain charm in its formulations." Lindgren concluded that "It is hard to summon up much irritation with Hawke in his latest literary effort." Kirkus Reviews gave an unfavorable review of Rules for a Knight, calling the book "Just the thing for those who want their New Age nostrums wrapped in medieval kit." The review also took issue with the historical accuracy of the book in its descriptions of knights and life in 15th century Cornwall. Carrie R. Wheadon of the website Common Sense Media gave a more favorable review, calling the book "a small philosophical gem," that "... invites family discussion on which values are most important and why."

Rules for a Knight appeared on the New York Times bestseller list at #12 during the week of December 6, 2015. It remained for two weeks.
