= Seymour Bernstein =

American pianist, composer and teacher (1927–2026)

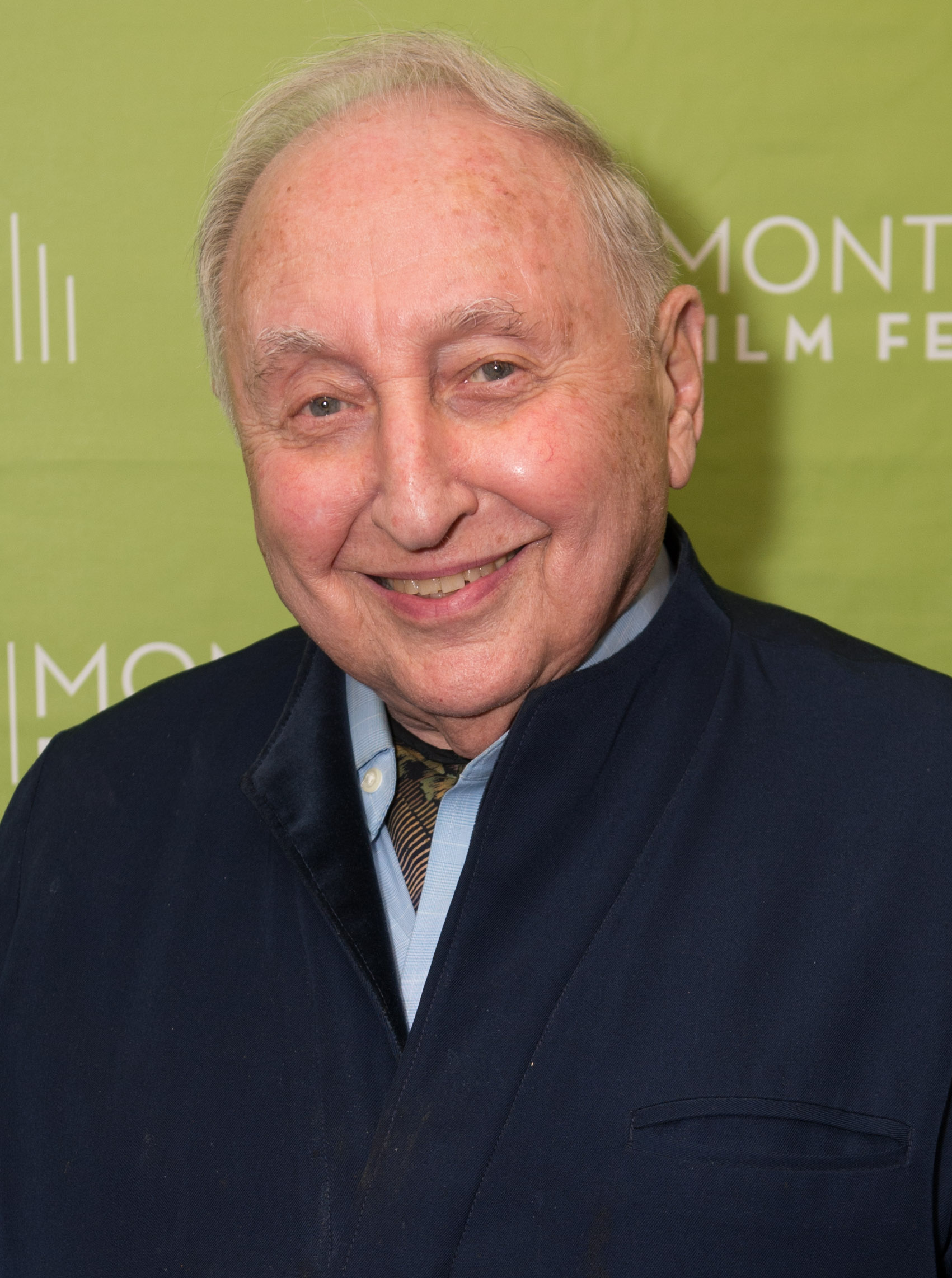
- Bernstein in 2015
- Born: April 24, 1927; Newark, New Jersey, U.S.
- Died: April 30, 2026 (aged 99); Damariscotta, Maine, U.S.
- Occupations: Pianist, professor at New York University

Seymour Abraham Bernstein (April 24, 1927 – April 30, 2026) was an American pianist, composer, and teacher. He is the subject of the documentary Seymour: An Introduction directed by the actor Ethan Hawke.

== Life and career ==
Bernstein was born in Newark, New Jersey, and grew up there; he graduated from Weequahic High School in Newark in 1945. He began teaching piano at the age of fifteen, when his teacher at the time, Clara Husserl, a pupil of Theodor Leschetizky, arranged for him to supervise the practicing of some of her gifted younger pupils. He soon had a class of pupils of his own. He achieved local fame as a performer, winning the Griffith Artist Award at the age of seventeen. During the Korean War, he gave concerts on the front lines and for military leaders. His concert career took him to Europe, Asia, and to many places in the Americas. He wrote With Your Own Two Hands and 20 Lessons in Keyboard Choreography, which has been published in German, Japanese, Korean, and Russian.

He studied with Alexander Brailowsky, Clifford Curzon, Jan Gorbaty, Nadia Boulanger, and George Enescu. In 1969 he made his debut with the Chicago Symphony Orchestra, playing the world premiere of Heitor Villa-Lobos's Concerto No. 2. He was the winner of the First Prize and Prix Jacques Durand at Fontainebleau, the National Federation of Music Clubs Award for Furthering American Music Abroad, a Beebe Foundation grant, two Martha Baird Rockefeller grants, and four U.S. State Department grants. He made a point of offering master classes and lecture recitals where his concert tours took him. When grant money allowed, he filled his suitcases with scores to distribute to teachers and students. He ceased performing in 1977 in order to concentrate on teaching, composing, and working in other creative outlets; he did not tell anyone that his farewell recital would be his last.

Bernstein composed music ranging from teaching material for students of all levels to sophisticated concert pieces. He performed as a guest artist with chamber ensembles and served on the juries of international competitions. He maintained a private studio in New York City and was also an adjunct associate professor of music and music education at New York University. On December 18, 2004, he was awarded an honorary doctorate from Shenandoah University in Winchester, Virginia, northwest of Washington, D.C. In 2015, actor and filmmaker Ethan Hawke made a documentary about Bernstein entitled Seymour: An Introduction. In 2020, Bernstein recorded a series of pedagogical lessons for tonebase piano covering works by Bach, Beethoven, Chopin, Mozart, Schumann, and technical exercises like arpeggios.

Bernstein died in Damariscotta, Maine, on April 30, 2026, at the age of 99.

== Bibliography ==
- Bernstein, Seymour (1981). With Your Own Two Hands: Self-Discovery Through Music. G. Schirmer Inc. ISBN 978-0793557127.
- Bernstein, Seymour (1991). Twenty Lessons In Keyboard Choreography. Seymour Bernstein Music. ISBN 978-0793503728.
- Bernstein, Seymour (2004). Monsters and Angels: Surviving a Career in Music. Manduca Music. ISBN 978-0634078378.
- Bernstein, Seymour (2005). Chopin - Interpreting His Notational Symbols. Hal Leonard Corporation. ISBN 978-0634098512.
