= Detroit Film Critics Society Award for Best Ensemble =

Film award

This is the list of annual winners for the Detroit Film Critics Society Award for Best Ensemble.

== 2010s ==
- 2017: The Post
  - The Big Sick
  - Lady Bird
  - Mudbound
  - Three Billboards Outside Ebbing, Missouri
- 2018: Vice
  - Crazy Rich Asians
  - Eighth Grade
  - The Favourite
  - Roma
- 2019: Once Upon a Time in Hollywood
  - Dolemite Is My Name
  - The Farewell
  - The Irishman
  - Parasite

== 2020s ==
- 2020: Minari
  - Da 5 Bloods
  - Ma Rainey's Black Bottom
  - One Night in Miami...
  - The Trial of the Chicago 7

== See also ==
- Robert Altman Award
- Screen Actors Guild Award for Outstanding Performance by a Cast in a Motion Picture
