= The Hottest State =

- Theatrical release poster
- Directed by: Ethan Hawke
- Written by: Ethan Hawke
- Based on: The Hottest State by Ethan Hawke
- Produced by: Alexis Alexanian; Yukie Kito
- Starring: Mark Webber; Catalina Sandino Moreno; Michelle Williams; Laura Linney; Ethan Hawke
- Cinematography: Chris Norr
- Edited by: Adriana Pacheco
- Music by: Jesse Harris
- Distributed by: THINKFilm
- Release dates: September 2, 2006 (VFF); August 24, 2007 (United States)
- Running time: 117 minutes
- Country: United States
- Language: English

The Hottest State is a 2006 drama film written and directed by Ethan Hawke, based on his 1996 novel of the same name. The film debuted at the Venice Film Festival on September 2, 2006, and received a limited theatrical release in the United States on August 24, 2007. It ran for five weeks in theaters and grossed $137,341 internationally. The film was subsequently issued on DVD in December 2007.

== Plot ==
The film tells the story of 20-year-old actor William, who falls in love for the first time with an aspiring singer, Sarah. As their love blossoms and languishes, young William reexamines himself and his relationship with his mother Jesse and estranged father Vince.

== Cast ==
- Mark Webber as William Harding
- Catalina Sandino Moreno as Sarah
- Michelle Williams as Samantha
- Laura Linney as Jesse
- Ethan Hawke as Vince
- Daniel Ross as Young Vince
- Alexandra Daddario as Kim
- Cherami Leigh as Danielle
- Glen Powell as John Jaegerman
- Sônia Braga as Mrs. Garcia
- Anne Clarke as Young Jesse

== Soundtrack ==
Professional ratings
Review scores
Source	Rating
Allmusic	4/5 stars
The A.V. Club	B
IGN	8.7/10
Pitchfork Media	2.2/10

The music score for the film was composed by Grammy-winning musician Jesse Harris. Aside from the inclusion of two score tracks, the album is composed of sixteen original songs interpreted by such musicians as Willie Nelson, Norah Jones, Cat Power, Bright Eyes, and Feist. It was also named one of "The Top 10 CDs of 2007" by the New York Daily News.

=== Track listing ===
1. "Ya No Te Veria Mas (Never See You)" - 2:06 (Rocha)
2. "Always Seem To Get Things Wrong" - 3:47 (Willie Nelson)
3. "Somewhere Down The Road" - 2:44 (Feist)
4. "Big Old House" - 3:54 (Bright Eyes)
5. "The Speed of Sound" - 4:19 (Emmylou Harris)
6. "It Will Stay With Us" - 2:17 (Jesse Harris)
7. "If You Ever Slip" - 2:33 (The Black Keys)
8. "Crooked Lines" - 4:28 (M. Ward)
9. "World of Trouble" - 4:35 (Norah Jones)
10. "Never See You" - 5:04 (Brad Mehldau)
11. "It's Alright To Fail" - 3:40 (Cat Power)
12. "One Day The Dam Will Break" - 2:58 (Jesse Harris)
13. "You, The Queen" - 4:17 (Tony Scherr)
14. "Morning In A Strange City (Cafe)" - 2:00
15. "No More" - 3:59 (Rocha)
16. "Dear Dorothy" - 2:28 (Jesse Harris)
17. "Never See You" - 2:46 (Rocha)
18. "There Are No Good Second Chances" - 4:58

== Reception ==
On the review aggregator website Rotten Tomatoes, 32% of 53 critics' reviews are positive, with an average rating of 4.9/10, earning it a score of "Rotten". The website's consensus reads: "Despite strong performances and a unique style, The Hottest State is too self-conscious and pretentious to truly succeed." Metacritic, which uses a weighted average, assigned the film a score of 45 out of 100, based on 20 critics, indicating "mixed or average" reviews.
