= Highway 99: A Double Album =

- Directed by: Ethan Hawke
- Produced by: Barak Moffitt; Daniel Seliger; Jeremy Coon; Jason Fine; Gus Wenner; Ethan Hawke
- Cinematography: Buddy Squires
- Edited by: Barry Poltermann
- Production companies: Mercury Studios; Sony Music Publishing; Rolling Stone Films; Under the Influence; September Club
- Release date: August 29, 2025 (Telluride)
- Running time: 174 minutes
- Country: United States
- Language: English

Highway 99: A Double Album is a 2025 American documentary film about American country music singer Merle Haggard. It was directed by Ethan Hawke.
