= Raymond & Ray =

2022 comedy-drama film

- Official release poster
- Directed by: Rodrigo García
- Written by: Rodrigo García
- Produced by: Alfonso Cuarón; Bonnie Curtis; Julie Lynn
- Starring: Ewan McGregor; Ethan Hawke; Maribel Verdú; Sophie Okonedo
- Cinematography: Igor Jadue-Lillo
- Edited by: Michael Ruscio
- Music by: Jeff Beal
- Production companies: Apple Studios; Esperanto Filmoj; Mockingbird Pictures
- Distributed by: Apple TV+
- Release dates: September 12, 2022 (TIFF); October 14, 2022 (United States); October 21, 2022 (Apple TV+)
- Running time: 100 minutes
- Countries: United States; Mexico
- Language: English

Raymond & Ray is a 2022 comedy-drama film written and directed by Rodrigo García. The film stars Ewan McGregor, Ethan Hawke, Maribel Verdú, and Sophie Okonedo.

Raymond & Ray had its world premiere at the Toronto International Film Festival on September 12, 2022, and was released in selected theaters on October 14, 2022, before its streaming release on October 21, 2022, by Apple TV+.

== Plot ==
Raymond drives on a late, rainy night to a remote cabin to inform his half-brother, Ray, that their father, Ben Harris, has died. Raymond informs Ray that it was their father's last wish that all his sons attend his funeral. Raymond works in a boring office job and is in the middle of a divorce. Ray is a recovering heroin addict who gave up playing jazz music on the trumpet as a way to thumb his nose at his father, who had pushed him to learn to play the instrument. Ray is at first reluctant to go, but Raymond convinces him after admitting that he lost his driver's license when he was arrested for a DUI. The brothers haven't seen each other in nearly five years because of the abuse their father inflicted on them during childhood.

Driving most of the next day, they finally arrive at the funeral home. To their shock, their father had requested to be buried in the nude, and he wanted his sons to dig his grave with their own hands. They go to the home their father was living in and meet his nurse, Lucia, who was also his lover. While Lucia's home, she provides each of them with a box from their father. Raymond receives dolls, ice skates, and condoms. Ray receives a trumpet that he thought his father had destroyed when he was a teenager. To his surprise, Lucia tells Ray his father refurbished the trumpet a few weeks earlier. Ray then grapples with the emotional trauma his father inflicted on him and his brother.

At the funeral home showing, Lucia arrives and leaves a nude photograph of herself in Harris's shirt pocket. Raymond takes the photograph after Lucia leaves. Later on, Ray meets Kiera, who helped Harris at the hospital in his final days, and he tells him that Harris listened to the same instrumental song to calm down. Ray invites her to the funeral in the cemetery.

While digging the grave, Ray converses with Reverend West about Harris's spirituality. Lucia arrives with her son, Simon, and reveals that he is Ray and Raymond's brother as well. Ray asked Simon about Harris's phone to know the instrumental song, but Simon said he wiped out the phone memory. Two fraternal twins arrive at the funeral and reveal that they are also Harris's sons. All brothers take turns digging the grave. Ray meets Kiera at the funeral and Ray discusses his late wife's funeral. After their father is laid to rest, Reverend West asks Raymond to say a few words. Overcome with childhood trauma, Raymond runs to the car and gets a gun. Initially, he points it at himself, then later shoots his father's coffin in the ground. Lucia consoles him afterward. Ray retrieves his trumpet and plays an instrumental song at the funeral as a cathartic release of his childhood trauma. At the end of the funeral, Reverend West provides each brother with a letter from their father.

After the funeral, Raymond goes home with Lucia and Ray meets Kiera at a bar. Raymond bonds with Lucia and they kiss. While kissing, Lucia finds Raymond's nude photograph of her and she walks to the door. However, she locks the door and they have sex. Ray and Kiera bond at the bar. Kiera takes Ray to the jazz club and he plays his trumpet. When leaving the jazz club, Kiera invites Ray to come with her but he declines.

Raymond reads his letter where his father apologizes for his abusive behavior and reveals Ray is not his half-brother. Ray's mother was already pregnant when she met Harris who assumed the role of his real father. The letter ends with Raymond given a choice to reveal the truth to Ray or not. Conversely, Ray's letter says he was a golden boy and that he loves him. In the morning, Raymond opts to stay with Lucia for a few days and the brothers lovingly say goodbye to each other. Raymond says they will meet again in a few days to talk and Ray drives away in the rain.

== Cast ==
- Ewan McGregor as Raymond
- Ethan Hawke as Ray
- Maribel Verdú as Lucia
- Sophie Okonedo as Kiera
- Maxim Swinton as Simon
- Vondie Curtis-Hall as Reverend West
- Chris Silcox as Leon
- Chris Grabher as Vincent
- Oscar Nunez as Mendez

== Production ==
It was announced in August 2021 that Ewan McGregor and Ethan Hawke had been cast to star in the film, which is written and directed by Rodrigo García. In October, Maribel Verdú and Sophie Okonedo were added to the cast, with Maxim Swinton joining the next month.

Virginia governor Ralph Northam announced in September 2021 that the film will be shot in Central Virginia beginning in the fall. Filming began in Richmond the following month. Filming took place in Hopewell, Virginia from October 18 to 21. Filming took place at Oakwood Cemetery in Richmond in November.

Jeff Beal composed the film's score.

== Release ==
It had its world premiere at the Toronto International Film Festival on September 12, 2022. It also made it to 'World Cinema' section of 27th Busan International Film Festival, screening on October 7, 2022.

=== Critical reception ===
On the review aggregator website Rotten Tomatoes, 48% of 81 critics' reviews are positive. The website's consensus reads: "Ethan Hawke and Ewan McGregor are almost -- but not quite -- compelling enough to make up for Raymond & Ray's listless narrative." Metacritic, which uses a weighted average, assigned the film a score of 49 out of 100, based on 22 critics, indicating "mixed or average" reviews.
