= Seymour: An Introduction (film) =

- Film poster
- Directed by: Ethan Hawke
- Starring: Seymour Bernstein
- Distributed by: IFC Films
- Release dates: August 30, 2014 (Telluride); March 13, 2015 (United States)
- Running time: 84 minutes
- Country: United States
- Language: English
- Box office: $907,742

Seymour: An Introduction is a 2014 American documentary film. Directed by Ethan Hawke, the film documents the career of Seymour Bernstein. The film premiered at the 2014 Telluride Film Festival, and was released on March 13, 2015, by IFC Films. As of May 2023, it has a 100% rating on the review aggregator website Rotten Tomatoes.

== Release ==
The film debuted on August 30, 2014 at the Telluride Film Festival. At the 2014 Toronto International Film Festival, the film was second runner-up for the People's Choice Award for Best Documentary, behind Do I Sound Gay? and the winner, Beats of the Antonov. in August 2014, it was announced IFC Films had acquired United States distribution rights to the film. The film was released on March 13, 2015 in a limited release.

== Reception ==
The film has received positive reviews. On Rotten Tomatoes, the film has a 100% rating based on 68 reviews, with a weighted average of 7.80/10. The site's consensus reads: "Seymour Bernstein's genuineness shines so brightly in Seymour: An Introduction that viewers will forgive Ethan Hawke's reverent treatment". It also has a Metacritic score of 83 based on 27 critics, indicating "Universal acclaim".

== See also ==
- List of films with a 100% rating on Rotten Tomatoes
