= List of awards and nominations received by Richard Linklater =

List of Richard Linklater awards
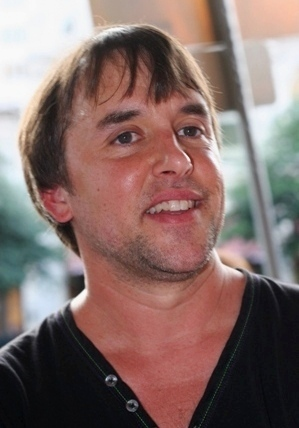
Award	Wins	Nominations
Academy Awards	0	5
BAFTA Awards	2	3
Golden Globe Awards	1	2
Independent Spirit Awards	1	9
Primetime Emmy Awards	0	1

The following are the accolades received by American filmmaker Richard Linklater.

He has received numerous accolades including a Golden Globe Award, two BAFTA Awards, and an Independent Spirit Award. He has also been nominated for five Academy Awards and a Primetime Emmy Award.

He is known for his films such as Before Sunrise (1994), Before Sunset (2004), Before Midnight (2013), Bernie (2012), and Boyhood (2014).

== Major associations ==
=== Academy Awards ===
Year	Category	Nominated work	Result	Ref.
2005	Best Adapted Screenplay	Before Sunset	Nominated	
2014	Best Adapted Screenplay	Before Midnight	Nominated	
2015	Best Picture	Boyhood	Nominated	
2015	Best Director	Boyhood	Nominated	
2015	Best Original Screenplay	Boyhood	Nominated	

Directed Academy Award performances
Under Linklater's direction, these actors have received Academy Award nominations for their performances in their respective roles.

Year	Performer	Film	Result
Academy Award for Best Actor
2025	Ethan Hawke	Blue Moon	Nominated
Academy Award for Best Supporting Actor
2014	Ethan Hawke	Boyhood	Nominated
Academy Award for Best Supporting Actress
2014	Patricia Arquette	Boyhood	Won

=== Golden Globes ===
Year	Category	Nominated work	Result	Ref.
2015	Best Motion Picture - Drama	Boyhood	Won	
2015	Best Director	Boyhood	Won	
2015	Best Screenplay	Boyhood	Nominated	
2025	Best Motion Picture - Musical or Comedy	Blue Moon	Nominated	

Directed Golden Globe Award performances
Under Linklater's direction, these actors have received Golden Globe Award nominations for their performances in their respective roles.

Year	Performer	Film	Result
Golden Globe Award for Best Actor - Motion Picture Musical or Comedy
2003	Jack Black	School of Rock	Nominated
2012	Jack Black	Bernie	Nominated
2024	Glenn Powell	Hit Man	Nominated
2025	Ethan Hawke	Blue Moon	Nominated
Golden Globe Award for Best Actress - Motion Picture Musical or Comedy
2013	Julie Delpy	Before Midnight	Nominated
2019	Cate Blanchett	Where'd You Go, Bernadette	Nominated
Golden Globe Award for Best Supporting Actor – Motion Picture
2015	Ethan Hawke	Boyhood	Nominated
Golden Globe Award for Best Supporting Actress – Motion Picture
2015	Patricia Arquette	Boyhood	Won

=== BAFTA Awards ===
Year	Category	Nominated work	Result	Ref.
2015	Best Film	Boyhood	Won	
2015	Best Direction	Boyhood	Won	
2015	Best Original Screenplay	Boyhood	Nominated	

Directed BAFTA Award performances
Under Linklater's direction, these actors have received BAFTA Award nominations for their performances in their respective roles.

Year	Performer	Film	Result
BAFTA Award for Best Actor
2025	Ethan Hawke	Blue Moon	Nominated
BAFTA Award for Best Actor in a Supporting Role
2009	Christian McKay	Me and Orson Welles	Nominated
2014	Ethan Hawke	Boyhood	Nominated
BAFTA Award for Best Actress in a Supporting Role
2014	Patricia Arquette	Boyhood	Won

=== Emmy Awards ===
Year	Category	Nominated work	Result	Ref.
Primetime Emmy Awards
2017	Outstanding Children's Program	School of Rock	Nominated	

=== Independent Spirit Awards ===
Year	Category	Nominated work	Result	Ref.
1991	Best First Feature	Slacker	Nominated	
1991	Best Director	Slacker	Nominated	
2005	Best Screenplay	Before Sunset	Nominated	
2013	Best Film	Bernie	Nominated	
2014	Best Screenplay	Before Midnight	Nominated	
2015	Best Film	Boyhood	Nominated	
2015	Best Director	Boyhood	Won	

Directed Independent Spirit Award performances
Under Linklater's direction, these actors have received Independent Spirit Award nominations for their performances in their respective roles.

Year	Performer	Film	Result
Independent Spirit Award for Best Male Lead
2012	Jack Black	Bernie	Nominated
Independent Spirit Award for Best Female Lead
2013	Julie Delpy	Before Midnight	Nominated
Independent Spirit Award for Best Supporting Male
1997	Ajay Naidu	SubUrbia	Nominated
2009	Christian McKay	Me and Orson Welles	Nominated
2014	Ethan Hawke	Boyhood	Nominated
Independent Spirit Award for Best Supporting Female
2001	Uma Thurman	Tape	Nominated
2014	Patricia Arquette	Boyhood	Won
Independent Spirit Award for Best Supporting Performance
2025	Zoey Deutch	Nouvelle Vague	Nominated

=== César Awards ===
Year	Category	Nominated work	Result	Ref.
2026	Best Film	Nouvelle Vague	Nominated	
2026	Best Director	Nouvelle Vague	Won	

Directed César Award performances
Under Linklater's direction, these actors have received César Award nominations for their performances in their respective roles.

Year	Performer	Film	Result
César Award for Best Male Revelation
2025	Guillame Marbeck	Nouvelle Vague	Nominated

== Festival awards ==
=== Berlin Film Festival ===
Year	Category	Nominated work	Result	Ref.
1995	Golden Bear	Before Sunrise	Nominated	
1995	Silver Bear for Best Director	Before Sunrise	Won	
2004	Golden Bear	Before Sunset	Nominated	
2014	Golden Bear	Boyhood	Nominated	
2014	Silver Bear for Best Director	Boyhood	Won	
2025	Golden Bear	Blue Moon	Nominated	

=== Cannes Film Festival ===
Year	Category	Nominated work	Result	Ref.
2006	Un Certain Regard	A Scanner Darkly	Nominated	
2006	Palme d'Or	Fast Food Nation	Nominated	
2025	Palme d'Or	Nouvelle Vague	Nominated	

=== Sundance Film Festival ===
Year	Category	Nominated work	Result	Ref.
1991	Grand Jury Prize - Dramatic	Slacker	Nominated	

=== Venice Film Festival ===
Year	Category	Nominated work	Result	Ref.
2001	Golden Lion	Waking Life	Nominated	

== Guild awards ==
=== Directors Guild Awards ===
Year	Category	Nominated work	Result	Ref.
2014	Outstanding Directing – Feature Film	Boyhood	Nominated	

=== Producers Guild Awards ===
Year	Category	Nominated work	Result	Ref.
2014	Best Theatrical Motion Picture	Boyhood	Nominated	

=== Writers Guild Awards ===
Year	Category	Nominated work	Result	Ref.
2004	Best Adapted Screenplay	Before Sunset	Nominated	
2013	Best Adapted Screenplay	Before Midnight	Nominated	
2014	Best Original Screenplay	Boyhood	Nominated	
2024	Best Adapted Screenplay	Hit Man	Nominated	

== Miscellaneous awards ==
Year	Award	Category	Film	Result
1993	Locarno International Film Festival	Golden Leopard	Dazed and Confused	Nominated
1996	Chicago Film Critics Association	Best Screenplay	Before Sunrise	Nominated
2002	Ottawa International Animation Festival	Best Animated Feature Film	Waking Life	Won
2002	Jeonju International Film Festival	Daring Digital Award	Waking Life	Nominated
2004	Gotham Awards	Best Film	Before Sunset	Nominated
2004	Utah Film Critics Association	Best Screenplay shared with Ethan Hawke and Julie Delpy	Before Sunset	Nominated
2005	Bodil Awards	Best American Film	Before Sunset	Nominated
2005	International Cinephile Society Awards	Best Screenplay shared with Ethan Hawke and Julie Delpy	Before Sunset	2nd Place
2005	National Society of Film Critics	Best Screenplay shared with Ethan Hawke and Julie Delpy	Before Sunset	3rd Place
2005	Online Film Critics Society	Best Adapted Screenplay shared with Ethan Hawke and Julie Delpy	Before Sunset	Nominated
2005	Argentine Film Critics Association	Silver Condor Award for Best Adapted Screenplay shared with Ethan Hawke and Julie Delpy	Before Sunset	Nominated
2007	Austin Film Critics Association	Austin Film Award	A Scanner Darkly	Won
2007	Hugo Award	Best Dramatic Presentation - Long Form	A Scanner Darkly	Nominated
2009	Austin Film Critics Association	Austin Film Award	Me and Orson Welles	Won
2012	Gotham Awards	Best Film	Bernie	Nominated
2013	Austin Film Critics Association	Austin Film Award	Before Midnight	Won
2013	Boston Online Film Critics Association Awards	Best Screenplay shared with Ethan Hawke and Julie Delpy	Before Midnight	Won
2013	Chicago Film Critics Association	Best Adapted Screenplay shared with Ethan Hawke and Julie Delpy	Before Midnight	Nominated
2013	Dublin Film Critics' Circle	Best Director	Before Midnight	Nominated
2013	Dublin Film Critics' Circle	Best Screenplay shared with Ethan Hawke and Julie Delpy	Before Midnight	Won
2013	Denver Film Critics Society	Best Adapted Screenplay shared with Ethan Hawke and Julie Delpy	Before Midnight	Nominated
2013	Detroit Film Critics Society	Best Screenplay shared with Ethan Hawke and Julie Delpy	Before Midnight	Nominated
2013	Gotham Awards	Best Film	Before Midnight	Nominated
2013	Houston Film Critics Society	Best Screenplay shared with Ethan Hawke and Julie Delpy	Before Midnight	Nominated
2013	Hollywood Film Awards	Best Screenwriter shared with Ethan Hawke and Julie Delpy	Before Midnight	Won
2013	Los Angeles Film Critics Association	Best Screenplay shared with Ethan Hawke and Julie Delpy	Before Midnight	Won
2013	New York Film Critics Circle	Best Screenplay shared with Ethan Hawke and Julie Delpy	Before Midnight	2nd Place
2013	Online Film Critics Society	Best Adapted Screenplay shared with Ethan Hawke and Julie Delpy	Before Midnight	Nominated
2013	San Diego Film Critics Society	Best Adapted Screenplay shared with Ethan Hawke and Julie Delpy	Before Midnight	Won
2013	San Francisco Film Critics Circle	Best Adapted Screenplay shared with Ethan Hawke and Julie Delpy	Before Midnight	Nominated
2013	St. Louis Film Critics Association	Best Adapted Screenplay shared with Ethan Hawke and Julie Delpy	Before Midnight	Nominated
2013	Satellite Award	Best Adapted Screenplay shared with Ethan Hawke and Julie Delpy	Before Midnight	Nominated
2013	Utah Film Critics Association	Best Adapted Screenplay shared with Ethan Hawke and Julie Delpy	Before Midnight	Won
2013	Village Voice Film Poll	Best Screenplay shared with Ethan Hawke and Julie Delpy	Before Midnight	Won
2013	Washington D.C. Area Film Critics Association	Best Adapted Screenplay	Before Midnight	Nominated
2014	Bodil Awards	Best American Film	Before Midnight	Nominated
2014	Critics' Choice Movie Award	Best Adapted Screenplay shared with Ethan Hawke and Julie Delpy	Before Midnight	Nominated
2014	National Society of Film Critics	Best Screenplay shared with Ethan Hawke and Julie Delpy	Before Midnight	Won
2014	Argentine Film Critics Association	Silver Condor Award for Best Foreign Film	Before Midnight	Nominated
2014	Toronto Film Critics Association	Best Screenplay shared with Ethan Hawke and Julie Delpy	Before Midnight	2nd Place
2014	AACTA International Awards	Best Film	Boyhood	Nominated
2014	AACTA International Awards	Best Direction	Boyhood	Nominated
2014	AACTA International Awards	Best Screenplay	Boyhood	Nominated
2014	Alliance of Women Film Journalists	Best Film	Boyhood	Won
2014	Alliance of Women Film Journalists	Best Director	Boyhood	Won
2014	Alliance of Women Film Journalists	Best Original Screenplay	Boyhood	Nominated
2014	Austin Film Critics Association	Best Film	Boyhood	Won
2014	Austin Film Critics Association	Best Director	Boyhood	Won
2014	Austin Film Critics Association	Best Austin Film	Boyhood	Won
2014	Boston Society of Film Critics	Best Film	Boyhood	Won
2014	Boston Society of Film Critics	Best Director	Boyhood	Won
2014	Boston Society of Film Critics	Best Screenplay	Boyhood	Won
2014	Chicago Film Critics Association	Best Film	Boyhood	Won
2014	Chicago Film Critics Association	Best Director	Boyhood	Won
2014	Chicago Film Critics Association	Best Original Screenplay	Boyhood	Nominated
2014	Dallas–Fort Worth Film Critics Association	Best Director	Boyhood	2nd Place
2014	Dallas–Fort Worth Film Critics Association	Best Screenplay	Boyhood	2nd Place
2014	Detroit Film Critics Society	Best Film	Boyhood	Won
2014	Detroit Film Critics Society	Best Director	Boyhood	Won
2014	Detroit Film Critics Society	Best Screenplay	Boyhood	Won
2014	Denver Film Critics Society	Best Picture	Boyhood	Nominated
2014	Denver Film Critics Society	Best Director	Boyhood	Won
2014	Denver Film Critics Society	Best Original Screenplay	Boyhood	Nominated
2014	Dublin Film Critics' Circle	Best Director	Boyhood	Won
2014	Florida Film Critics Circle	Best Director	Boyhood	Won
2014	Gotham Independent Film Awards	Audience Award	Boyhood	Won
2014	Guldbagge Awards	Best Foreign Film	Boyhood	Nominated
2014	Houston Film Critics Society Awards	Best Director	Boyhood	Won
2014	Houston Film Critics Society Awards	Best Screenplay	Boyhood	Won
2014	Iowa Film Critics	Best Director	Boyhood	Won
2014	Kansas City Film Critics Circle	Robert Altman Award for Best Director	Boyhood	Won
2014	Los Angeles Film Critics Association	Best Director	Boyhood	Won
2014	New York Film Critics Circle	Best Director	Boyhood	Won
2014	New York Film Critics Online	Best Director	Boyhood	Won
2014	North Texas Film Critics Association	Best Director	Boyhood	Won
2014	Norwegian International Film Festival	Norwegian Film Critics Award	Boyhood	Won
2014	Online Film Critics Society Awards	Best Director	Boyhood	Won
2014	Online Film Critics Society Awards	Best Original Screenplay	Boyhood	Nominated
2014	Phoenix Film Critics Society	Best Director	Boyhood	Won
2014	Phoenix Film Critics Society	Best Original Screenplay	Boyhood	Nominated
2014	San Diego Film Critics Society Awards	Best Director	Boyhood	Nominated
2014	San Diego Film Critics Society Awards	Best Original Screenplay	Boyhood	Nominated
2014	San Francisco Film Critics Circle Awards	Best Director	Boyhood	Won
2014	San Francisco Film Critics Circle Awards	Best Original Screenplay	Boyhood	Nominated
2014	San Francisco International Film Festival	Founder's Directing Award	Boyhood	Won
2014	Seattle International Film Festival	Best Film	Boyhood	Won
2014	Seattle International Film Festival	Best Director	Boyhood	Won
2014	Southeastern Film Critics Association	Best Director	Boyhood	Won
2014	St. Louis Film Critics Association Awards	Best Director	Boyhood	Nominated
2014	St. Louis Film Critics Association Awards	Best Original Screenplay	Boyhood	Nominated
2014	Sydney Film Festival	Sydney Film Prize	Boyhood	Nominated
2014	Toronto Film Critics Association	Best Director	Boyhood	Won
2014	Toronto Film Critics Association	Best Screenplay	Boyhood	Runner-up
2014	Vancouver Film Critics Circle	Best Director	Boyhood	Nominated
2014	Vancouver Film Critics Circle	Best Screenplay	Boyhood	Nominated
2014	Washington D.C. Area Film Critics Association Awards	Best Director	Boyhood	Won
2014	Washington D.C. Area Film Critics Association Awards	Best Original Screenplay	Boyhood	Nominated
2015	Critics' Choice Movie Award	Best Picture	Boyhood	Won
2015	Critics' Choice Movie Award	Best Director	Boyhood	Won
2021	Provincetown International Film Festival	Filmmaker on the Edge (Life's Work)	Boyhood	Won
2025	Rome Film Festival	Lifetime Achievement Award	Boyhood	Won
