= Louis Mackey (philosopher) =

American philosopher

- Born: Louis Henry Mackey; September 24, 1926; Sidney, Ohio, U.S.
- Died: March 25, 2004 (aged 77)
- Occupation(s): Professor and scholar of philosophy

Louis Henry Mackey (September 24, 1926 – March 25, 2004) was Professor of Philosophy at the University of Texas at Austin.

== Early life ==
Louis Henry Mackey was born in Sidney, Ohio in 1926. After earning a B.A. at Capital University in Columbus, Ohio he pursued graduate studies in philosophy, first at Duke University, and then Yale University, from which he received his Ph.D. in 1954. His dissertation was titled The Nature and the End of the Ethical Life according to Kierkegaard.

== Career ==
Mackey was an assistant professor in the Department of Philosophy at Yale before moving to Rice University in 1959. He then moved to the University of Texas at Austin in 1967. He had a reputation at each institution as an engaging teacher. In 1987 he won the Harry Ransom Award for Teaching Excellence at the University of Texas at Austin.

As a scholar, Mackey was known for his works on Kierkegaard including Kierkegaard: A Kind of Poet (University of Pennsylvania Press, 1972) and Points of View: Readings of Kierkegaard (Florida State University Press, 1986). He also wrote and lectured on Saint Augustine and Medieval Philosophy. His published work also included literary criticism, literary theory, and inquiries into the relationship of philosophy to literature, and in particular applying the tools of literary criticism to philosophical texts (early in his career using the tools of the New Critics, and then later with an emphasis on Jacques Derrida and Deconstruction). He was especially interested in the fictional works of Gilbert Sorrentino and Thomas Pynchon.

== Other ==
Mackey was known as an ardent lover of music and accomplished amateur singer of madrigal, oratorio, cantata, and liturgical chant. However, he was also on record as a defender of popular music claiming that The Beatles and The Rolling Stones "display a phenomenal melodic inventiveness and a harmonic and contrapuntal imagination that even us squares can dig."

He was also an occasional actor and appeared in two Richard Linklater films, Slacker (1991) and Waking Life (2001). Linklater later dedicated his adaptation of A Scanner Darkly to Mackey's memory.

== See also ==
- American philosophy
- List of American philosophers
