= Sparktop =

American website for children with learning disabilities

- Website type: Internet games, advice for children with learning disabilities
- Available in: English
- Founded: October 2003; 22 years ago
- Dissolved: March 28, 2014
- Owner: The Professor Garfield Foundation
- Founder: The Professor Garfield Foundation
- Commercial: Yes
- Registration: Optional
- Launched: October 2003; 22 years ago
- Current status: Defunct

Sparktop.org was an American website catering children and teenagers with learning disabilities, especially dyslexia. It was established by Schwab Learning before its rights were handed over to The Professor Garfield Foundation.

== History ==
Sparktop was created in October 2003 by Charles R. Schwab, who has dyslexia, and was the owner of the Charles and Helen Schwab Foundation through its Schwab Learning unit. It was set up largely for an 8-12 demographic that had learning disabilities, such as dyslexia or ADHD. Content mostly included advice from mentors and specialists By October 2007, the site attracted 4 million visits from over 140 countries.

In December 2007, The Professor Garfield Foundation (owned by Jim Davis) announced its intent to acquire Sparktop from Schwab Learning, as the Charles and Helen Schwab Foundation announced in September that it would change its model from a free one to a grant-driven one. By 2008, almost a year into the acquisition, it had a team of five contractors; all content was uploaded with prior review.

The site closed on March 28, 2014. Its main page was replaced by a disclaimer redirecting users to the PGF website, where most of its activities migrated, causing the end of Sparktop as an independent website.
