= Eamonn Healy =

Professor of chemistry

Eamonn Francis Healy (born 25 September 1958) is an Irish-American professor of chemistry, organic chemistry, and biochemistry at St. Edward's University in Austin, Texas, where his research focuses on the design of structure-activity probes to elucidate enzymatic activity. Targets include HIV-1 integrase, the c-Kit and src-abl proteins, and the metalloproteinases associated with CXCL16 shedding.

He was born in Newcastle West, County Limerick, Ireland. He received a doctorate in chemistry in 1984 from the University of Texas at Austin where he was a student of Dr. Michael J. S. Dewar. As a member of the Dewar research group he co-authored Austin Model 1, or AM1, a semi-empirical method for the quantum calculation of molecular electronic structure in computational chemistry. He appears in Richard Linklater's 2001 film Waking Life explaining "telescopic" and technological evolution. Dr. Healy is married to Shelley Bueche.

== See also ==
- Semi-empirical quantum chemistry methods

== Selected publications ==
- E.F. Healy "In Defense of a Heuristic Interpretation of Quantum Mechanics", J. Chem. Educ. 2010, 87, 559–563. doi:10.1021/ed8001545
- Eamonn F. Healy, Skylar Johnson, Charles Hauser, and Peter King "Tyrosine kinase inhibition: Ligand binding and conformational change in c-Kit and c-Abl." FEBS Lett. 2009, 583, 2899-2906 doi:10.1016/j.febslet.2009.07.051
- Eamonn F. Healy, Jonathan Sanders, Peter J. King and W. Edward Robinson, Jr "A Docking Study of L-Chicoric Acid with HIV-1 Integrase" J Mol. Graph. Model. 2009, 27, 14. doi:10.1016/j.jmgm.2008.09.011
- E. F. Healy, C. G. Wall, M.A. Fox, "Peptide Conformational Analysis using the TRIPOS Force Field", Intl. J. Quant. Chem., 1992, 44, 543. doi:10.1002/qua.560440412
- R.A. Caldwell, H. Misawa, M.J.S. Dewar, E.F. Healy,"An Unusually Large Secondary Deuterium Isotope Effect", J. Am. Chem. Soc. 1987, 109, 6869. doi:10.1021/ja00256a061
- M.J.S. Dewar, E. G. Zoebisch, E.F. Healy, J. J. P. Stewart,"AM1: A New General Purpose Quantum Mechanical Molecular Model", J. Am. Chem. Soc. 1985, 107, 3902. doi:10.1021/ja00299a024
- M.J.S. Dewar, E.F. Healy, J. J. P. Stewart,"Location of Transition States in Reaction mechanisms", J. Chem. Soc., Faraday Trans. 2 1984, 80, 227. doi:10.1039/F29848000227
- M.J.S. Dewar, E.F. Healy, "Why Life Exists", Organometallics 1982, 1, 1705. doi:10.1021/om00072a029
