= Tosca Tango Orchestra =

American musical project

The Tosca Tango Orchestra
- Origin: Austin, Texas, USA
- Genres: Nuevo tango, classical music
- Years active: 1997–present
- Labels: Nois
- Members: Glover Gill; Chris Maresh; Joshua Piper; Leigh Mahoney; Sara Nelson; Ames Asbell; Tracy Seeger
- Past members: George François; Luis Guerra; Tom Sender; Lara Hicks; Jeanine Attaway; Erik Grostic; Jessica Valls; Michelle Schumann

The Tosca Tango Orchestra is a joint effort between various Austin, Texas-based musicians founded by Glover Gill, in collaboration with The Tosca String Quartet, Luis Guerra, and Jeanine Attaway in 1997. The group performs original compositions in the nuevo tango style and has released six albums. Among these is the soundtrack to Richard Linklater's film Waking Life, which led to the group's international following.

== Waking Life OST ==
The soundtrack was performed and written by Glover Gill and the Tosca Tango Orchestra, except for two pieces written by Frédéric Chopin and second by Julián Plaza, and was relatively successful. Featuring the nuevo tango style, it bills itself "the 21st Century Tango". The group also appeared onscreen, in animated form, in two scenes in the film.

== Awards and appearances ==
A trip to Buenos Aires in 2000 brought them critical acclaim when they were featured artists at the 5th World Tango Summit and in 2003, the Tosca Tango Orchestra performed and recorded the Ballet Austin premiere of choreographer Stephen Mills’ Touch.

In September 2012, the group reunited for live performances in Austin, Texas to commemorate the 15th anniversary of their founding. Appearances included a VIP concert at the Church House Studio, a live performance on KUT radio's Eklektikos show, and a large public concert at the Scottish Rite Theater.

== Discography ==
The Tosca Tango Orchestra has released six albums as of September 2012.

=== Studio albums ===
- La Furia Del Tango (1998)
- Tia Pamelita (1998)
- Amado (1999)
- La Ciudad del Tango (2000)
- Waking Life OST (2001)
- Touch (2003)
- UNO Tango Suite (2008)
