= Rotoshop =

Graphics editing program

- Developer: Flat Black Films
- Type: Motion graphics / Visual effects / Animation
- Website: flatblackfilms.com

Rotoshop is a proprietary graphics editing program created by Bob Sabiston.

Rotoshop uses an animation technique called interpolated rotoscoping, which was used in Richard Linklater's films Waking Life and A Scanner Darkly, as well as the Talk to Chuck advertising campaign for Charles Schwab. The software is not currently available for use outside Flat Black Films, the developer of Rotoshop.

== Aims ==
The software was developed to allow the user to create animation using techniques reminiscent of hand-drawn animation, yet preserving nuanced expressions and gestures that would not generally appear using traditional animation methods.

== Use ==
=== Interpolation ===
Like Fantavision and Adobe Flash, Rotoshop allows for interpolation between keyframes. Once the artist has drawn key frames at the start and end of a time period, the program automatically generates intermediate frames. It is a simple form of "automatic tweening". Interpolated lines and shapes have a very smooth, fluid motion that is extremely difficult to achieve by hand-drawing each line.

=== Freezing ===
In order to manage different objects in the scene, the user can break the drawing into layers. A layer can be "frozen" so that a single drawing remains visible throughout the entire scene. This feature is useful for backgrounds and other elements that do not change over time. This frees the user from having to repeatedly draw these elements for every frame in the sequence.
