= Waking Life =

2001 American film by Richard Linklater

- Theatrical release poster
- Directed by: Richard Linklater
- Written by: Richard Linklater
- Produced by: Palmer West; Jonah Smith; Tommy Pallotta; Anne Walker-McBay
- Starring: Wiley Wiggins
- Cinematography: Richard Linklater; Tommy Pallotta
- Edited by: Sandra Adair
- Music by: Glover Gill
- Production companies: Independent Film Channel Productions; Thousand Words; Flat Black Films; Detour Filmproduction
- Distributed by: Fox Searchlight Pictures
- Release dates: January 23, 2001 (Sundance); October 19, 2001 (United States)
- Running time: 101 minutes
- Country: United States
- Language: English
- Budget: $2 million
- Box office: $3.2 million

Waking Life is a 2001 American adult animated surrealist drama film written and directed by Richard Linklater. The film explores a wide range of philosophical issues, including the nature of reality, dreams and lucid dreams, consciousness, the meaning of life, free will, and existentialism. The series of philosophical discussions at the film's core are processed by a young man who wanders through a succession of dreamlike realities wherein he encounters a series of characters playing themselves.

Shot in Mini DV camera, the film was edited digitally in animation through rotoscoping. It contains several parallels to Linklater's 1990 film Slacker. Waking Life premiered at the 2001 Sundance Film Festival, and was released on October 19, 2001. It received critical acclaim but underperformed at the box office.

== Plot ==
An unnamed young man lives an ethereal existence that lacks transitions between everyday events and eventually progresses toward an existential crisis. He observes quietly but later participates actively in philosophical discussions involving other characters—ranging from quirky scholars and artists to everyday restaurant-goers and friends—about such issues as metaphysics, free will, social philosophy, and the meaning of life. Other scenes do not include the protagonist but rather focus on an isolated person, a group of people, or a couple engaging in such topics from a disembodied perspective. Along the way, the film also touches upon existentialism, situationist politics, posthumanity, the film theory of André Bazin, and lucid dreaming, and references various intellectual and literary figures by name.

Gradually, the protagonist realizes that he is living out a perpetual dream, broken up only by occasional false awakenings. So far, he is mostly a passive onlooker, though this changes during a chat with a passing woman who suddenly approaches him. After she greets him and shares her creative ideas with him, he reminds himself that she is a figment of his own dreaming imagination. Afterward, he starts to converse more openly with other dream characters, but begins to despair about being trapped in a dream.

The protagonist's final talk is with a character (played by Linklater) whom he briefly encountered earlier in the film. This conversation reveals this other character's view that reality may be only a single instant that a person interprets falsely as time (and, thus, life); that living is simply the person's constant negation of God's invitation to become one with the universe; that dreams offer a glimpse into the infinite nature of reality; and that to be free from the illusion called life, one need only accept God's invitation.

The protagonist is last seen walking into a driveway, when he suddenly begins to levitate, paralleling a scene at the start of the film of a floating boy in the same driveway. The protagonist uncertainly reaches for a car door handle but is too swiftly lifted above the vehicle and over the trees. He rises into the endless blue expanse of the sky until he disappears from view.

== Cast ==
- Wiley Wiggins plays the protagonist.

The film features appearances from a wide range of actors and non-actors, including:

- Eamonn Healy
- Timothy "Speed" Levitch
- Adam Goldberg
- Nicky Katt
- Ethan Hawke as Jesse
- Julie Delpy as Céline
- Steven Prince
- Caveh Zahedi
- Otto Hofmann
- Richard Linklater
- Alex Jones
- Kim Krizan
- Louis H. Mackey
- Steven Soderbergh
- David Sosa
- Robert C. Solomon
- Steve Brudniak

== Production ==
=== Pre-production ===
In a 2001 interview, Linklater estimated that the idea for the film came "before I was even interested in film, probably 20 years ago." For a while he felt the idea for the film "didn't quite work", calling it "too blunt, too realistic" and saying, "I think to make a realistic film about an unreality the film had to be a realistic unreality".

=== Filming ===
The live-action footage was shot by Linklater and Palotta in Mini DV camera with real actors—including Ethan Hawke and Julie Delpy, who reprise their characters from Before Sunrise (1995) in one scene—over six weeks, starting in August 1999. Its original scenes of the footage later featured as extra editions in DVD.

According to Wiggins, there was a loose script that greatly changed during shooting.

=== Post-production ===
To create that visual effect, Linklater used an animation technique based on rotoscoping, in which animators overlay the live-action footage with animation that roughly approximates the images actually filmed. Linklater employed a variety of artists, so the movie's feel continually changes, producing a surreal, shifting dreamscape.

The animators used standard Apple Macintosh computers. The film was mostly produced using Rotoshop, a rotoscoping program that creates blends between key frame vector shapes and also uses virtual "layers", designed specifically for the production by Bob Sabiston. Linklater used this animation method again in his 2006 film A Scanner Darkly.

== Release ==
Waking Life premiered at the Sundance Film Festival in January 2001. The film was given a limited release in the United States on October 19, 2001.

=== Reception ===
On Rotten Tomatoes, the film has an approval rating of 81% based on 145 reviews, with an average rating of 7.40/10. The website's critical consensus reads: "Waking Life's inventive animated aesthetic adds a distinctive visual component to a film that could easily have rested on its smart screenplay and talented ensemble cast." Metacritic, which uses a weighted average, assigned the film a score of 85 out of 100, based on 32 critics, indicating "universal acclaim". Roger Ebert of the Chicago Sun-Times gave the film four stars out of four, calling it "a cold shower of bracing, clarifying ideas". Ebert later included the film on his list of "Great Movies". Lisa Schwarzbaum of Entertainment Weekly awarded the film an "A" rating, calling it "a work of cinematic art in which form and structure pursue the logic-defying (parallel) subjects of dreaming and moviegoing". Stephen Holden of The New York Times wrote it was "so verbally dexterous and visually innovative that you can't absorb it unless you have all your wits about you". Dave Kehr of The New York Times found the film "lovely, fluid, funny" and said it "never feels heavy or over-ambitious".

Conversely, J. Hoberman of The Village Voice wrote that Waking Life "doesn't leave you in a dream... so much as it traps you in an endless bull session". Frank Lovece called the film "beautifully drawn" but its content "pedantic navel-gazing".

In 2018, Linklater addressed the inclusion of Alex Jones in the film. In an interview with IndieWire, Linklater said, "I just thought he was kind of funny." He notes that he never imagined Jones would one day be taken seriously and that at the time, he did not think much of including him.

The film is recognized by American Film Institute in these lists:

- 2008 – AFI's 10 Top 10: Nominated Animation Film

=== Awards ===
- National Society of Film Critics award for Best Experimental Film
- New York Film Critics Circle award for Best Animated Film
- Venice Film Festival CinemAvvenire award for Best Film.

=== Home media ===
The film was released on VHS and DVD in North America in 2002. Special features included several commentaries, documentaries, interviews, trailers, and deleted scenes, as well as the short film Snack and Drink. A bare-bones DVD with no special features was released in Region 2 in 2003. A Blu-Ray was released in Germany and the UK.

== Soundtrack ==
The Waking Life OST was performed and written by Glover Gill and the Tosca Tango Orchestra, except for Frédéric Chopin's Nocturne in E-flat major, Op. 9, No. 2.

== See also ==
- Dream argument
- Dream art
- Oneironautics
- Simulated reality
