= Bob Sabiston =

- Born: 1967 (age 57–58); United States
- Occupation(s): Art director, programmer

Bob Sabiston (born 1967) is an American film art director, computer programmer, and creator of the Rotoshop software program for computer animation. Sabiston began developing software as an undergraduate and then graduate researcher in the MIT Media Lab from 1986 to 1991. While at MIT, and also after moving to Austin, Texas, in 1993, Sabiston used his 2D/3D software to create several short films, including God's Little Monkey (1994), "Beat Dedication" (1988), and "Grinning Evil Death" (1990). "Grinning Evil Death" was widely seen on the first episode of MTV's "Liquid Television" show. "God's Little Monkey" won the Prix Ars Electronica Golden Nica award for 1994.

In 1997, he developed his interpolating rotoscope program, Rotoshop, for an animation contest sponsored by MTV. The software was used to produce a series of 25 30-second interstitials in New York, collectively entitled "Project Incognito." He moved back to Austin in 1998 and with the help of local artists made the short film "RoadHead." This was followed in 1999 by short "Snack and Drink" in collaboration with Tommy Pallotta. "Snack and Drink" won several film festival awards and resides in the MOMA video collection. The shorts collection "Figures of Speech" followed in late 1999, for PBS. In 2000, Sabiston hired thirty graphic artists in the Austin area to help make Richard Linklater's film Waking Life.

After Waking Life Sabiston spent several years making more rotoscoped short films, including "Yard", "Earthlink Sucks", "Grasshopper". He directed a series of shorts for the PBS show "Life360". In 2003 he directed a short segment for the Lars von Trier film The Five Obstructions. Both "Grasshopper" and "The Five Obstructions" were shown at the Sundance Film Festival in 2004.

In 2004 Sabiston was hired as Head of Animation for Richard Linklater's A Scanner Darkly. He modified the software substantially for the film. Since 2005 he has also directed the "Talk to Chuck" campaign of animated advertisements for Charles Schwab.

Sabiston developed Rotoshop as a means to make rotoscoping easier for artists by automating the interpolation of hand-drawn shapes and lines over video. The software is proprietary and currently not available for use outside of Sabiston's production company, Flat Black Films.

Sabiston is also the creator of Inchworm Animation, a paint and animation program for the Nintendo DSi. It was released on April 25, 2011 in North America and subsequently in Europe, Australia, and Japan. A follow-up successor to the app, Butterfly: Inchworm Animation II was announced in October 2016 for the Nintendo 3DS. It was released the same month via the North American Nintendo eShop. A European and Japanese release is set to follow suit. The new app supports new raster and animation tools, sounds effects, and has native online sharing functions.

Since 2008 Sabiston has developed several apps for iOS: the 3d mind-mapping app Headspace, the modeling/3D-printing app Voxel, the video game Retroid, and a drawing keyboard, Jot Keyboard. In 2015, he released Lowlander, a tribute to Richard Garriott's classic video game Ultima II.
