= Waking Life (soundtrack) =

Soundtrack album by Tosca Tango Orchestra
- Released: October 23, 2001 (U.S.)
- Genre: Nuevo tango, Classical
- Length: 43:40
- Label: TVT Soundtrax

Tosca Tango Orchestra chronology
Touch (2001)	Waking Life (2001)	UNO Tango Suite (2008)

Waking Life is the soundtrack album from the 2001 film Waking Life. All but two of the tracks were composed by Glover Gill and performed by the Tosca Tango Orchestra. "Nocturne in E-Flat Major, Op. 9, No. 2" was originally composed by Frédéric Chopin and "Nocturna" was composed by Julián Plaza.

== Track listing ==
No.	Title	Music	Length
1.	"Ballade 4, Part 1"		3:05
2.	"Mi Otra Mitad de Naranja"		5:07
3.	"Pelo Negro"		4:16
4.	"La Cosa Pequena"		3:56
5.	"Lastima Grande"		2:50
6.	"Nocturne in E-Flat Major, Op. 9, No. 2"	Frédéric Chopin	4:00
7.	"Ballade 3"		7:53
8.	"El Cholulo"		2:51
9.	"Nocturna"	Julián Plaza	3:36
10.	"Super Sport"		3:54
11.	"Ballade 4, Part 2"		2:10

== Personnel ==
- Glover Gill – accordion, piano (track 6)
- Lara Hicks – violin
- Ames Asbell – viola
- Leigh Mahoney – viola
- Sara Nelson – cello
- Jeanine Attaway – piano
- Erik Grostic – double bass
- Uncredited – oboe
- Uncredited – baritone guitar (track 9)
