= It's Impossible to Learn to Plow by Reading Books =

- Directed by: Richard Linklater
- Written by: Richard Linklater
- Produced by: Richard Linklater
- Starring: Richard Linklater
- Cinematography: Richard Linklater
- Edited by: Richard Linklater
- Production company: Detour Filmproduction
- Release date: 1988
- Running time: 86 minutes
- Country: United States
- Language: English
- Budget: $3,000

It's Impossible to Learn to Plow by Reading Books is a 1988 American film written, produced, and directed by Richard Linklater, who also stars in it. It is Linklater's debut film.

== Plot ==
The protagonist (played by Linklater) receives a cassette tape from a friend, with a recorded message encouraging him to "blow off school" and leave Austin. The protagonist goes about his daily activities, including shooting a gun from his window. He gets on a train and after a long journey, meets his friend in Missoula, Montana. They visit Glacier National Park and walk through town, before the protagonist leaves to visit West Coast cities such as San Francisco, also by train.

He arrives back in Austin, only to travel to a family reunion and his mother's house. Finally, the protagonist returns to Austin once again.

== Production ==
Richard Linklater began making short films upon moving to Austin, Texas in the late 1980s, where he also began running the Austin Film Society. Linklater spent two years working on the film which cost $3,000 and was shot with a Super 8 film camera.

After converting the Super 8 film to tape, Linklater spent a year editing the film at the local public-access television, ACTV. The film premiered on the station.

Linklater sent a letter to Monte Hellman asking him to watch the film. Hellman enjoyed the film and replied to Linklater's letter praising the film. Linklater later used the letter to help raise funds for his next film, Slacker.

== Release ==
The film never received a widespread release, but was made available as a bonus feature on the DVD and Blu-ray release of Linklater's film Slacker (1990) by The Criterion Collection.
