= Charles R. Schwab =

American billionaire and businessman

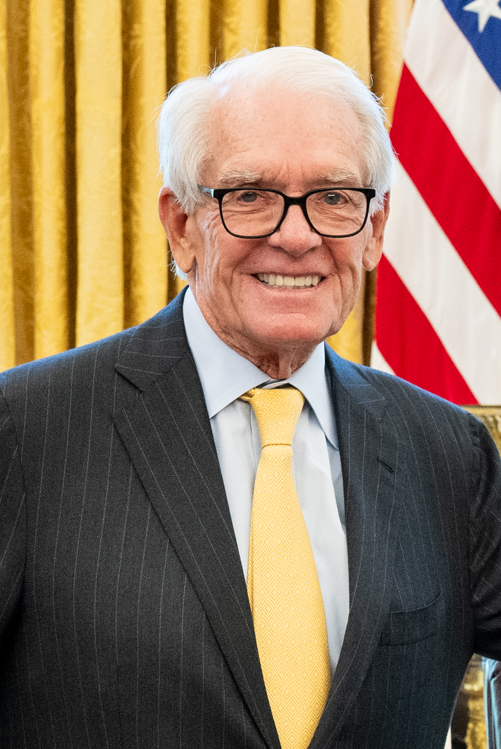
- Schwab in 2025
- Born: Charles Robert Schwab Sr. July 29, 1937 (age 89); Sacramento, California, U.S.
- Education: Stanford University (BA, MBA)
- Occupation: Businessman
- Known for: Founder, chairman, and former CEO of Charles Schwab Corporation
- Political party: Republican
- Spouse(s): Susan Cotter (div. 1970s); Helen O'Neill
- Children: 5

Charles Robert Schwab Sr. (born July 29, 1937) is an American investor and financial executive. The founder and chairman of the Charles Schwab Corporation, he pioneered discount sales of equity securities starting in 1975. His company became by far the largest discount securities dealer in the United States. He semi-retired from the company in 2008 when he stepped down as CEO, but he remains chairman and is the largest shareholder.

As of January 2026, his net worth is estimated by Forbes to be $13.5 billion, making him the 215th richest person in the world.

== Early life and education ==
Schwab was born in Sacramento, California, the son of Terrie and Lloyd Schwab. He is one of two children, having a younger sister. His father was a lawyer and the district attorney of Yolo County, while his mother was a housewife. Schwab grew up in Woodland, California, before moving to Santa Barbara, California, at age 12. In his youth, he worked several jobs, including as an ice cream salesman, a railroad switchman, a roustabout in an oil field, and as a caddie.

He attended Santa Barbara High School, where he was captain of the golf team. He attended pre-college school at Holy Rosary Academy in Woodland. Schwab graduated from Stanford University in 1959 with a Bachelor of Arts in Economics. In 1961, he graduated from Stanford Graduate School of Business with a Master of Business Administration. He is a knight of the Sigma Nu fraternity.

== Investment career ==
In 1963, Schwab and three other partners launched Investment Indicator, an investment newsletter. At its height, the newsletter had 3,000 subscribers, each paying $84 ($883.37 in 2025 dollars) a year to subscribe. In April 1971, the firm incorporated in California as First Commander Corporation, a wholly owned subsidiary of Commander Industries, Inc., to offer traditional brokerage services and publish the Schwab investment newsletter. In November of that year, Schwab and four others purchased all the stock from Commander Industries, Inc. In 1972, Schwab himself bought all the stock from what was once Commander Industries.

=== Charles Schwab & Co. ===
In 1973, First Commander changed its name to Charles Schwab & Co., Inc. A decisive turning point came in 1975, when the U.S. Securities and Exchange Commission deregulated the securities industry through the Securities Acts Amendments of 1975, allowing companies like Schwab to charge any fees they wanted. Schwab had long complained that the established firms showed little concern for the needs of their customers. In those times securities were not bought by consumers, they were sold by salesmen, who made higher commissions and profits by selling riskier securities regardless of possible disadvantages to the consumers. Schwab set up a series of radically different policies. First, charges to consumers were cut in half. Second, salesmen were (and still are today) paid hourly salaries, rather than commissions on the total sale price. It set up a toll-free number to take orders nationwide and later set up a 24/7 telephone system that would allow customers to place orders from anywhere, at any time. Established firms were outraged by these innovations, and tried to block Schwab's expansion.

=== Expansion ===
In September 1975, Schwab opened its first branch in Sacramento, California. It expanded across the state and cut its expenses by putting a heavy emphasis on automation. In 1981, Bank of America offered Schwab $53 million ($187.7 million in 2025 dollars) in stock for his 37 percent ownership. He sold, but remained as president of a semi-autonomous unit. At this point the unit had annual sales of $41 million, 600 employees, and 220,000 customers through 40 branches. Expansion was rapid, reaching 1.6 million customers in 1986, with sales of $308 million. Bank of America, however, had its own separate severe problems, and its stock plunged. The SEC investigated Schwab on the possibility he was selling stock to take advantage of insider information; he denied it, and no charges were filed. Tensions between the Schwab unit and Bank of America escalated until 1987, when the deal was cut for Schwab to buy back the brokerage company for $230 million. Schwab took the firm public. In 1988, however, the company was forced to rebate $2 million to customers whose funds had been illegally used.

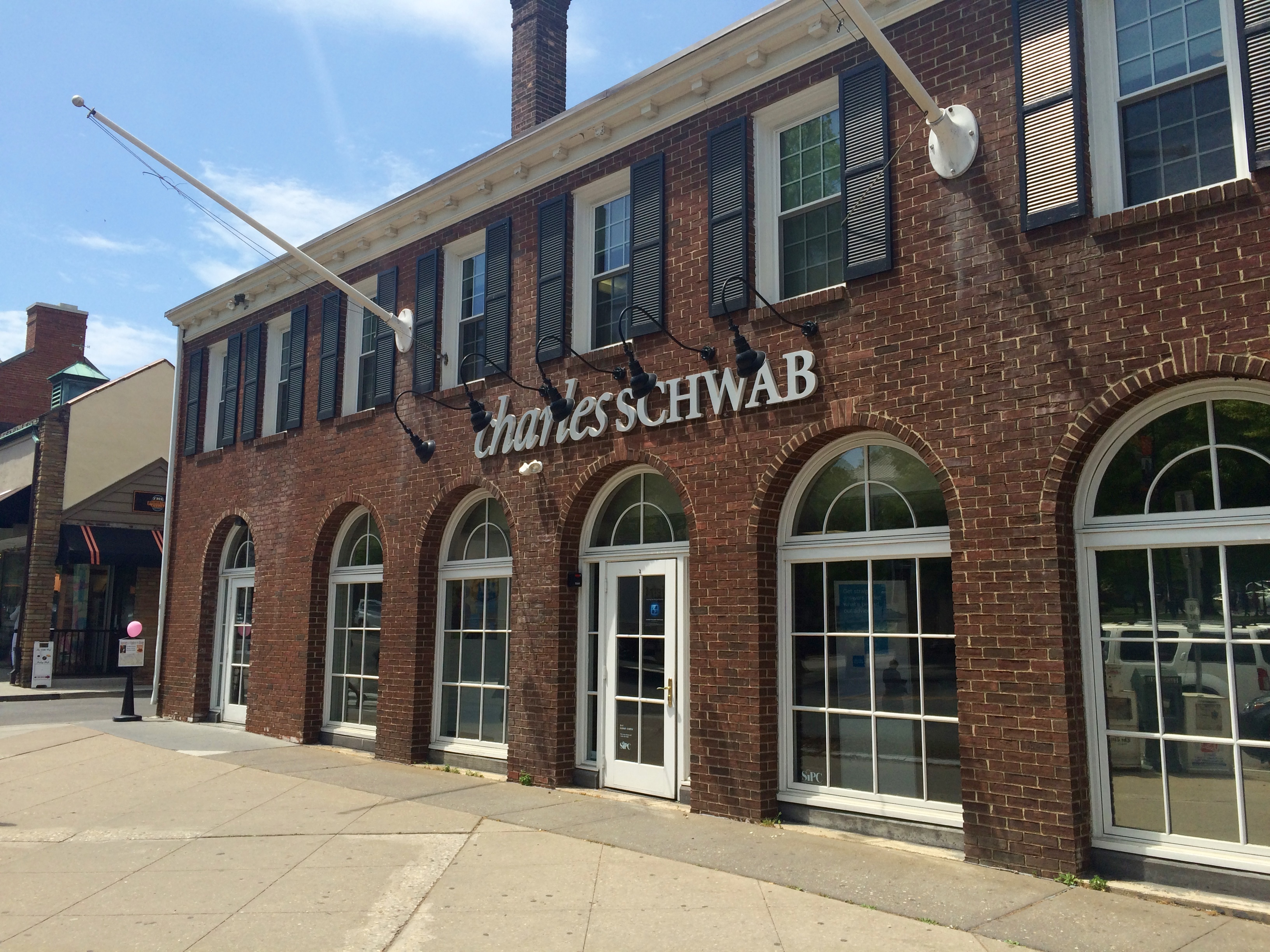
A Charles Schwab location in Princeton, New Jersey

In 1977, Schwab began offering seminars to clients. By 1978, the company had 45,000 client accounts total, and the number grew to 84,000 in 1979. In 1980 Schwab established the industry's first 24-hour quotation service, and the total of client accounts grew to 147,000. In 1981 Schwab became a member of the NYSE, and the total of client accounts grew to 222,000. In 1982, Schwab became the first firm to offer 24/7 order entry and quote service. It opened its first international office in Hong Kong, and the number of client accounts totaled 374,000.

In 1984, the firm innovated with the Mutual Funds Marketplace, which gave customers a choice of 140 no-load funds. It expanded to 500 no-load funds by 1992.

By 1995 the company was by far the largest discount broker, with revenue of $1.4 billion and $200 billion in total assets managed. By 1996 there were 3.6 million active accounts.

Schwab always stressed cutting-edge technology, and pioneered computerization to replace paperwork. The emergence of the World Wide Web in the mid-1990s posed a new threat with new startups trying to exploit their software. Schwab responded in 1996 by becoming the first major financial services firm to sell online listed and over-the-counter stocks, as well as mutual funds and bonds. The startups charged $36 a trade, and Schwab charged $39 per Internet trade, compared to $160 charged by traditional brokerages using the old technology. In 2000, Schwab introduced mobile/wireless trading with its PocketBroker mobile app that functioned on RIM (BlackBerry), Palm, Windows CE, and WAP-enabled phones, with deployments in the US, UK, and Hong Kong.

David S. Pottruck, who had spent the majority of his 20 years at the brokerage as Schwab's right-hand man, shared the CEO title with Schwab from 1998 to 2003. In May 2003, Schwab stepped down, and gave Pottruck sole control as CEO. Just a year later, on July 24, 2004, the company's board fired Pottruck, replacing him with Schwab. News of Pottruck's removal came as the firm had announced that overall profit had dropped 10 percent, to $113 million, for the second quarter, driven largely by a 26 percent decline in revenue from customer stock trading. After coming back into control, Schwab conceded that the company had "lost touch with our heritage", and quickly refocused the business on providing financial advice to individual investors. He also rolled back Pottruck's fee hikes. The company rebounded, and earnings began to turn around in 2005, as did the stock.

Schwab also introduced Charles Schwab Bank, N.A., a federally chartered intrastate retail bank headquartered in Reno, Nevada. The application for the bank was approved in February 2003 by the Office of the Comptroller of the Currency.

== Personal life ==
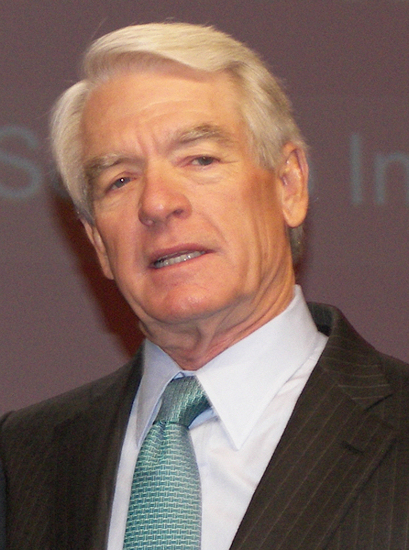
Schwab in 2007

Schwab sits on the board of trustees of the San Francisco Museum of Modern Art and is a chair emeritus. He lived in San Francisco until 2020 when he sold his house for $14 million. He now lives in Florida.

He is a practicing Roman Catholic and is involved in philanthropy.

Schwab is dyslexic but was unaware of it until the age of 40 when he learned that one of his sons is also dyslexic. The Charles and Helen Schwab Foundation, whose primary focus is "to ensure that each student reaches his or her full potential", supports research and programs related to learning disabilities, including dyslexia.

=== Family ===
Schwab has been married twice. He has three children from his first marriage to Susan Cotter: Charles Jr. (known as "Sandy"), Carrie, and Virginia. Charles and Susan Schwab later divorced. (Schwab's first wife is not to be confused with politician Susan Carol Schwab.)

Schwab subsequently remarried, to Helen (O'Neill) Schwab, with whom he has two children: Katie and Michael. His daughter Carrie is married to author Gary Pomerantz. She is president of the Charles and Helen Schwab Foundation and also served as a council member on President Obama's Advisory Council on Financial Capability. His son Charles Jr., who played quarterback at Northwestern University, is the father of four children.

Schwab's granddaughter, Samantha Schwab, served in the first Trump administration in the White House Office of Legislative Affairs. In January 2025, Trump announced that Samantha would serve in his second administration as a deputy to the Treasury Chief of Staff.

== Political and economic views ==
Schwab is a Republican, who has donated heavily to the party (including the National Republican Senatorial Committee and the National Republican Congressional Committee). Schwab opposes a wealth tax.

In 2012, Schwab donated nearly $9 million to Americans for Job Security, a group which opposed Barack Obama in the 2012 election.

In 2017, Schwab donated the maximum legal individual amount of $101,700 to the Republican National Committee's legal defense fund, which partially paid for the legal defense of President Donald Trump during the Mueller investigation. In 2019, Schwab was listed as one of the largest PAC contributors in the US, donating $12.5 million to general conservative political activities, with $2 million given to Trump.

In 2021, following the January 6 United States Capitol attack, Schwab's firm ceased political donations and discontinued its political action committee, citing the "hyperpartisan" political climate. The PAC donated its remaining funds to the Boys & Girls Clubs of America and historically black colleges and universities. Following this, Schwab has continued political donations as an individual, separate from his firm. In March 2021, Schwab donated more than $366,000 to a pro-McCarthy PAC; as well as over $200,000 each to the NRCC and the NRSC.

== Wealth ==
As of March 2025, Schwab is worth $11.2 billion, according to Forbes. The Charles and Helen Schwab Foundation was formed in 1987. In 2013, it reported assets of $270 million and made $13 million in grants. He serves as its chairman; his wife is the president.

== Awards and honors ==
- 1989: Golden Plate Award of the American Academy of Achievement
- 1997: "King of Online Brokers" by Forbes magazine
- 2016: Financial Innovation Award, The Museum of American Finance
