= Slacker (film) =

1990 film by Richard Linklater

- Theatrical release poster
- Directed by: Richard Linklater
- Written by: Richard Linklater
- Produced by: Richard Linklater
- Starring: Richard Linklater; Kim Krizan; Mark James; Stella Weir; John Slate; Louis Mackey; Teresa Taylor
- Cinematography: Lee Daniel
- Edited by: Scott Rhodes
- Distributed by: Orion Classics
- Release dates: April 21, 1990 (USA Film Festival); July 5, 1991 (United States)
- Running time: 97 minutes
- Country: United States
- Language: English
- Budget: $23,000
- Box office: $1.2 million

Slacker is a 1990 American comedy drama film written, produced, and directed by Richard Linklater, who also stars in it. Filmed around Austin, Texas, the film follows an ensemble cast of eccentric and misfit locals throughout a single day. Each character is on screen for only a few minutes before the film picks up someone else in the scene and follows them.

Slacker premiered at the USA Film Festival on April 21, 1990, and was released in the United States on July 5, 1991, by Orion Classics. The film received positive reviews from critics and grossed over $1 million against a production budget of $23,000. In 2012, Slacker was selected for preservation in the United States National Film Registry by the Library of Congress as being "culturally, historically, or aesthetically significant".

== Plot ==
Slacker follows a single day in the life of an ensemble of mostly under-30 bohemians and misfits in Austin, Texas. The film follows various eccentric and misfit characters and scenes, never staying with one character or conversation for more than a few minutes before moving on to someone else in the scene and following them.

The characters include a talkative taxi passenger (played by Linklater), a UFO buff who insists the U.S. has been on the moon since the 1950s, a JFK conspiracy theorist, an elderly anarchist who befriends a man trying to rob his house, a television set collector, and a woman trying to sell a Madonna pap smear. The woman selling the pap smear appears on the film poster, and was played by Butthole Surfers drummer Teresa Taylor.

Other characters include a woman hiding a black eye behind sunglasses who offers a random pick of Oblique Strategies to passers-by, a young man who perhaps accidentally or perhaps intentionally has run over his mother with the family car, three renters in a rooming house who discover and read a pack of postcards on the floor of a fellow renter who has moved out, a young woman who has just arrived back in town after her parents put her in a mental hospital in Dallas, and a man who tries to convince a friend to throw a tent and a typewriter into a creek to reject an ex-girlfriend symbolically.

A young man is trying to have coffee and read a newspaper in a diner, who is told by one patron to "stop following me" and by another that "you should quit traumatizing women with sexual intercourse," before a third patron, who lives near the diner and is dressed in just a bathrobe, steals his newspaper. There's a couple who get into an argument over the girl giving a can of Coke to a homeless person, progress into personal attacks, and end by realizing they're going to miss the beginning of the movie they're on their way to see, so they agree to meet up again at the movie theater in two hours for the next showing. There's a hitchhiker who tells the two boys who give him a ride into town that he's come from the funeral of his stepfather, but when he walks into the store where his friend works, the friend asks, "How'd you get out?" and the hitchhiker replies, "Good behavior."

Most of the characters grapple with feelings of social exclusion or political marginalization, which are recurring themes in their conversations. They discuss social class, terrorism, joblessness, the 1988 presidential election, government control of the media, and art of various kinds, including a woman depicting her menstrual cycle with a ring of colored teacups and two drunk college boys discussing oppression and family structures in Scooby-Doo and The Smurfs. While some characters engage in conversation with each other, others end up giving long monologues to people who are unwilling to respond, pretending to be interested until they can separate themselves, or being stuck listening to them.

The film ends with a wordless sequence underscored by whimsical music, in which four friends drive around, filming the town and each other with handheld 16mm cameras. They leave the car and run through a park to a cliff overlooking a river. As they dance and laugh, one of the four gleefully throws his camera over the edge.

== Cast ==
- Richard Linklater as "Should Have Stayed at the Bus Station"
- Rudy Basquez as Taxicab Driver
- Mark James as "Hit-and-Run Son"
- Bob Boyd as Officer Bozzio
- Terrence Kirk as Officer Love
- Stella Weir as Stephanie from Dallas
- Teresa Taylor as Pap Smear Pusher
- Mark Harris as T-shirt Terrorist
- Frank Orrall as "Happy-Go-Lucky Guy"
- Abra Moore as "Has Change"
- Louis Black as Paranoid Paper Reader
- Sarah Harmon as "Has Faith in Groups"
- John Slate as Conspiracy-A-Go-Go author
- Lee Daniel as GTO
- Charles Gunning as Hitchhiker Awaiting "True Call"
- Louis Mackey as Old Anarchist
- Scott Rhodes as Disgruntled Grad Student
- Kim Krizan as "Questions Happiness"
- Athina Rachel Tsangari as Cousin from Greece (credited as Rachel Reinhardt)
- Kalman Spelletich as Video Backpacker
- Kendall Smith as "Post-Modern Paul Revere"

== Production ==
=== Development ===
==== Conception ====
Richard Linklater had founded the Austin Film Society in 1985 with a group of collaborators, including filmmaker Lee Daniel. Despite initial success, the Austin Film Society's business dwindled. Linklater's disappointment was compounded by not being able to distribute his recently completed first feature, the experimental It's Impossible to Learn to Plow by Reading Books, which had cost Linklater $3,000 to make. Linklater began to plan a second feature, to be shot in Galveston, although plans fell through for it when he could not secure funding. He began to consider an idea in which multiple characters are followed by a camera in a relay-race style, an idea he had considered for five years. The earliest treatment of the film comprised linked scenes with different characters, and was tentatively titled No Longer/Not Yet.

=== Pre-production ===
==== Writing ====
Most of the scenes in the treatment grew out of experiences that Linklater had either gone through or was told about by others. For instance, the episode in which a son runs over his own mother was inspired by an incident that occurred near Linklater and Lee Daniel's Austin house. Linklater explained that these ideas were "inspired by or adapted from bookish ideas of pre-existing texts," such as his friend Jack Meredith's short stories, or another friend, Sid Moody's, conspiracy theories. The final scene was inspired by an afternoon Daniel had spent atop the Twin Peaks in San Francisco.

Linklater developed a list of guidelines for the film, including its narrative, dialogue, and camera movements. The list functioned as an unofficial script or storyboard, and envisioned the film as "one long sequence", directing Daniel's photography to be "quiet but eloquent", muted, and with a documentary feel. Linklater's intent was to allow the viewer to "be aware that they are watching a construct," believing that the form of the film would underline the alienation of the characters.

==== Fundraising and crew ====
Most of the funds for the film were gathered from Linklater's family and friends. Linklater used a letter he received from Monte Hellman praising It's Impossible to Learn to Plow by Reading Books to help raise funds. He used his Shell gasoline credit card to supply cast and crew with snacks and drinks, also providing homemade peanut butter sandwiches. Linklater gathered a crew from among the film society. Due to his 16mm Arriflex camera and experience, Daniel became the director of photography, and helped secure a dolly for the film's production borrowed from KLRU, a local TV station. Linklater and Daniel had a 16mm editing bed that would contribute to the majority of the film's post-production. A number of other film society contributors and regulars were enlisted as crew, including Denise Montgomery as sound recordist, Deb Pastor as art director, and Meg Brennan as script supervisor. Without being formally offered the job, Anne Walker-McBay became production manager and co-casting director after expressing interest in casting for the film. Walker-McBay's husband, Chris Walker, was enlisted as an assistant to Daniel.

==== Casting ====
Linklater initially did not want to appear in the film as the first character, but was convinced to do so by Daniel.

Slacker did not have an organized casting process. Rather, Linklater employed friends and approached people in the street with off-beat looks or personality. He carefully worked with each actor to shape their roles, carefully constructing the improvisational look of the film. Linklater also cast notable Austinites of the era, such as Louis Black, Abra Moore, and Teresa Taylor of the band Butthole Surfers.

The film was shot in 1989 with a 16 mm Arriflex camera on location in Austin, Texas with a budget of $23,000 ($52,000 in today's dollars). According to Linklater, the film was shot without permits. They were approached by the police at one point, but were allowed to proceed when Linklater explained they were making a movie.

== Release ==
Slacker premiered at Austin's Dobie Theater on July 27, 1990. Orion Classics acquired Slacker for nationwide distribution, and released a slightly modified 35mm version on July 5, 1991. It did not receive a wide release but went on to become a cult film bringing in a domestic gross of $1.2 million ($2.53 million in today's dollars).

=== Critical reception ===
Roger Ebert gave the film three out of four stars and wrote, "Slacker is a movie with an appeal almost impossible to describe, although the method of the director, Richard Linklater, is as clear as day. He wants to show us a certain strata of campus life at the present time". In his review for The New York Times, Vincent Canby wrote, "Slacker is a 14-course meal composed entirely of desserts or, more accurately, a conventional film whose narrative has been thrown out and replaced by enough bits of local color to stock five years' worth of ordinary movies".

Owen Gleiberman of Entertainment Weekly gave the film an "A−" rating, writing, "Slacker has a marvelously low-key observational cool ... the movie never loses its affectionate, shaggy-dog sense of America as a place in which people, by now, have almost too much freedom on their hands". In his review for the Washington Post, Hal Hinson wrote, "This is a work of scatterbrained originality, funny, unexpected and ceaselessly engaging". Rolling Stone's Peter Travers wrote, "What Linklater has captured is a generation of bristling minds unable to turn their thoughts into action. Linklater has the gift of a true satirist: He can make laughter catch in the throat".

In his review for the Austin Chronicle, Chris Walters wrote, "Few of the many films shot in Austin over the past 10 or 15 years even attempt to make something of the way its citizens live. Slacker is the only one I know of that claims this city's version of life on the margins of the working world as its whole subject, and it is one of the first American movies ever to find a form so apropos to the themes of disconnectedness and cultural drift". Time magazine's Richard Corliss wrote, "Though set in the '90s, Slacker has a spirit that is pure '60s, and in this loping, loopy, sidewise, delightful comedy, Austin is Haight-Ashbury".

On review aggregator website Rotten Tomatoes, the film holds an approval rating of 82% based on 45 reviews, and an average rating of 7.3/10. The website's critical consensus reads, "Slacker rests its shiftless thumb on the pulse of a generation with fresh filmmaking that captures the tenor of its time while establishing a benchmark for 1990s indie cinema." On Metacritic, the film has a weighted average score of 69 out of 100, based on 16 critics, indicating "generally favorable reviews".

American Film Institute recognition:

- AFI's 100 Years... 100 Laughs - Nominated

=== Home media ===
Slacker was released on VHS in June 1992 by Orion Home Video. An estimated 7,000 copies were shipped (it was also released on LaserDisc, but a reliable estimate of units shipped is lacking). A book also titled Slacker containing the screenplay, interviews, and writing about the film was published by St. Martin's Press, also in 1992. The film was re-released on VHS on March 7, 2000, by MGM. The film was released to DVD worldwide on January 13, 2003. A two-disc Criterion Collection boxed-set edition was released on August 31, 2004, in the US and Canada only. The set was designed to embody the film's "eccentric Austin personality" and look as if the designer slacked off and hastily put together the illustrations for the set. It has many "extras", including a book on the film and Linklater's first feature film, It's Impossible to Learn to Plow by Reading Books, released on home video for the first time. Entertainment Weekly gave this edition an "A−" rating.

== Impact and legacy ==
The release of the film is often taken as a starting point (along with the earlier Sex, Lies, and Videotape) for the independent film movement of the 1990s. Many of the independent filmmakers of that period credit the film with inspiring or opening doors for them, including Kevin Smith, who has said that the film was the inspiration for Clerks.

Linklater has said that he wanted the word "slacker" to have positive connotations. For example, in a self-interview in the Austin Chronicle, Linklater stated: "Slackers might look like the left-behinds of society, but they are actually one step ahead, rejecting most of society and the social hierarchy before it rejects them. The dictionary defines slackers as people who evade duties and responsibilities. A more modern notion would be people who are ultimately being responsible to themselves and not wasting their time in a realm of activity that has nothing to do with who they are or what they might be ultimately striving for."

In the early 1990s, Slacker was widely considered an accurate depiction of Generation X because the film's young adult characters are more interested in quasi-intellectual pastimes and socializing than career advancement. Linklater—who is a member of the "Baby Boom" generation (having been born in 1960)—has long since eschewed the role of generational spokesperson. Moreover, Slacker includes members of various generations, and many of its themes are universal rather than generation-specific.

== Slacker 2011 ==
In 2011, to commemorate the 20th anniversary of Slacker's release, Daniel Metz and Lars Nilsen of the Alamo Drafthouse Cinema chain developed a remake of the film, titled Slacker 2011, which is an anthology film in which each segment of the original film is remade as a segment written and directed by a different filmmaker or filmmaking team. Altogether 26 directors were involved in the film, including Bradley Beesley, Bob Byington, Michael Dolan, Jay Duplass, Geoff Marslett, PJ Raval, Bob Ray, Duane Graves, Ben Steinbauer and David Zellner. Some segments are word-for-word remakes, while others are only loosely based on their source material. The film was produced by Alamo Drafthouse and the Austin Film Society. Linklater was not involved in the project, although he approved of the idea, saying, "It would be against the slacker ethic to not give one's blessing to someone else's weird inspiration."

== See also ==
- 1991 in film
- Hyperlink cinema
- List of cult films
- Low-budget film
