= A Scanner Darkly (film) =

2006 film by Richard Linklater

- Theatrical release poster
- Directed by: Richard Linklater
- Screenplay by: Richard Linklater
- Based on: A Scanner Darkly by Philip K. Dick
- Produced by: Tommy Pallotta; Anne Walker-McBay; Palmer West; Jonah Smith; Erwin Stoff
- Starring: Keanu Reeves; Robert Downey Jr.; Woody Harrelson; Winona Ryder; Rory Cochrane
- Cinematography: Shane F. Kelly
- Edited by: Sandra Adair
- Music by: Graham Reynolds
- Production companies: Thousand Words; Section Eight; Detour Filmproduction; 3 Arts Entertainment
- Distributed by: Warner Independent Pictures
- Release date: July 7, 2006 (United States)
- Running time: 100 minutes
- Country: United States
- Language: English
- Budget: $8.7 million
- Box office: $7.7 million

A Scanner Darkly is a 2006 American adult animated science fiction thriller film written and directed by Richard Linklater, based on the 1977 novel by Philip K. Dick. The film tells the story of identity and deception in a near-future dystopia constantly under intrusive high-tech police surveillance in the midst of a drug addiction epidemic.

The film was shot digitally and then animated using interpolated rotoscope, an animation technique in which animators trace over the original footage frame by frame, for use in live-action and animated films, giving the finished result a distinctive animated look. Principal photography began on May 17, 2004, and lasted six weeks.

The film features performances by Keanu Reeves, Robert Downey Jr., Woody Harrelson, and Winona Ryder. Steven Soderbergh and George Clooney are among the executive producers. A Scanner Darkly had a limited release on July 7, 2006, and a wider release on July 28, 2006, by Warner Independent Pictures. The film was screened at the 2006 Cannes Film Festival and the 2006 Seattle International Film Festival, and was a finalist for the Hugo Award for Best Dramatic Presentation, Long Form in 2007. The film received generally positive reviews, with praise for its performances and animation, but performed poorly at the box office.

== Plot ==
In the near future, the United States has lost the war on drugs. Substance D, a powerful drug that causes bizarre hallucinations, has swept the country. Approximately 20 percent of the population is addicted. The government has developed an invasive, high-tech surveillance system and a network of undercover officers and informants.

Bob Arctor is an undercover agent, assigned to immerse himself in the drug's underworld and infiltrate the supply chain. Arctor has a vision of being in his house with a wife and two children in Anaheim, California; today he has two drug-addicted, layabout housemates: Luckman and Barris. The three spend time taking D and having complex, possibly paranoiac examinations of their experiences. At the police station, Arctor maintains privacy by wearing a "scramble suit" that constantly changes every aspect of his appearance and voice; he is known only by the code name "Fred". Arctor's senior officer, "Hank", and all undercover officers wear scramble suits, protecting their identities even from each other.

Since going undercover, Arctor has become addicted to Substance D, which he buys from Donna, whom Arctor hopes to purchase large enough quantities of D from so that she is forced to introduce him to her supplier. They have a tense, at times caring romantic relationship but she rebuffs his physical advances. At work, "Hank" orders "Fred" to increase surveillance on Arctor and his associates. Arctor's house is at the center of his investigation, since this is where Donna and the other addicts spend time. Arctor is inexpertly negotiating a double life and his use of D is damaging his brain. Barris is informing on Arctor to "Hank", arguing that Arctor is a terrorist, whilst also angling to be hired as a cop. Barris unknowingly conveys this information in the presence of Arctor, who is hidden behind his scramble suit.

"Hank" reveals to "Fred" that he has long known that he is Arctor, who seems surprised, and repeats his name in a disoriented, unfamiliar tone. "Hank" informs him that the real purpose of the surveillance is to catch Barris and that the police were deliberately increasing Barris' paranoia until he attempted to cover his tracks. "Hank" reprimands Arctor for becoming addicted to Substance D and warns him that he will be disciplined. "Hank" explains how seriously brain-damaged Arctor has become from D and "Hank" "phones" Donna, asking her to come pick up Arctor and take him to New-Path, a corporation that runs rehabilitation clinics. "Hank" leaves and in private removes his scramble suit, revealing Donna. At the New-Path clinic, Arctor and other D addicts show serious cognitive deficiencies.

"Donna", now known as Audrey, meets with Mike, a fellow police officer. They discuss how New-Path is secretly responsible for the manufacture and distribution of Substance D. Audrey expresses her growing ethical aversion to their police work, in which they deliberately recruited Arctor—without his knowledge—to become addicted to D; his health sacrificed so that he might eventually enter a New-Path rehabilitation center unnoticed as an addict and collect incriminating evidence of New-Path's D farms. Audrey and Mike debate whether Arctor's mind will recover enough to grasp the situation. New-Path sends Arctor to a labor camp at an isolated farm, where he mindlessly repeats what others tell him. Tending to corn crops, Arctor discovers hidden rows of the blue flowers that produce D. He secretly hides one flower in his boot, to bring to his "friends" at his next holiday from the farm.

== Cast ==
- Keanu Reeves as Bob Arctor / "Fred" / Bruce
- Robert Downey Jr. as James Barris
- Woody Harrelson as Ernie Luckman
- Winona Ryder as Donna Hawthorne / Audrey / "Hank"
- Rory Cochrane as Charles Freck
- Chamblee Ferguson as Medical Deputy 2
- Angela Rawna as Medical Deputy 1
- Mitch Baker as Brown Bear Lodge Host
- Lisa Marie Newmyer as Connie
- Dameon Clarke as Mike
- Hugo Perez as New-Path Staff Member
- Jason Douglas as New-Path Farm Manager
- Marco Perella as Donald
- Alex Jones as Street Prophet With Bullhorn
- Sean Allen as Additional Fred Scramble Suit Voice (voice)
- Mark Turner as Additional Hank Scramble Suit Voice (voice)
- Leif Anders as Freck Suicide Narrator (voice)
- Turk Pipkin as The Creature

== Production ==
=== Development ===
Originally, Richard Linklater toyed with adapting the Philip K. Dick novel Ubik but stopped early on because he was unable to obtain the rights and he "couldn't quite crack it". He began thinking about A Scanner Darkly, another dark novel, while talking to producer Tommy Pallotta during the making of Waking Life. Linklater liked A Scanner Darkly more than Ubik and felt that he could make a film out of it. According to Linklater, the challenge was to capture "the humor and exuberance of the book but not let go of the sad and tragic". Linklater was not interested in turning the book into a big-budget action thriller as had been done in the past because he felt that A Scanner Darkly was "about these guys and what they're all doing in their alternative world and what's going through their minds is really what keeps the story moving". He wanted to keep the budget under $10 million so that he could have more creative control, remain faithful to the book, and make it an animated film.

After completing School of Rock, Linklater told Pallotta that he wanted to make A Scanner Darkly next. It was important to him that Dick's estate approve his film. Pallotta wrote a personal appeal and pitched a faithful adaptation of the novel to Russ Galen, the Philip K. Dick estate's literary agent who shared it with the late author's two daughters (Laura Leslie and Isa Hackett) who own and operate their father's trust. Dick's daughters were not too keen on "a cartoon version" of A Scanner Darkly. After high-profile adaptations of Minority Report and Paycheck, they took a more proactive role in evaluating every film proposal, including unusual projects like Linklater's. They read Linklater's screenplay and then met with him to discuss their respective visions of A Scanner Darkly. They felt that it was one of their father's most personal stories and liked that Linklater was not going to treat the drug aspects lightly, that he wanted to set it in the near future and make it right away.

=== Casting ===
For the dual roles of Arctor and Fred, Linklater thought of Keanu Reeves. However, Linklater figured that the actor would have been reluctant to make another science fiction film after making The Matrix trilogy. Robert Downey Jr. was attracted to the film when he heard Reeves was going to star and Linklater to direct. He thought that the script was the strangest one he had ever read. Linklater wrote the role of Freck with Rory Cochrane in mind. The actor was interested but did not want to recreate his role in Dazed and Confused. Both Woody Harrelson and Winona Ryder agreed to appear in the film based on the script. Reeves and Ryder agreed to work for the Screen Actors Guild scale rate plus any back-end profits. As with Linklater's earlier Waking Life, controversial conspiracy theorist and broadcaster Alex Jones has a small cameo.

=== Principal photography ===
Linklater assembled the cast for two weeks of rehearsals in Austin, Texas before principal photography began in order to fine-tune the script. The result was a fusion of Linklater's writing, the novel and the actors' input. To prepare for their respective roles, Cochrane came up with his character five minutes before he got on the elevator to work; Downey Jr. memorized his dialogue by writing it all out in run-on sentences, studying them and then converting them to acronyms; and Reeves relied on the book, marking down each scene in the screenplay to the corresponding page.

Principal photography began on May 17, 2004, and lasted six weeks. Arctor's house was located on Eric Circle in Southeast Austin. The previous tenants had left a month prior to filming and left the place in such a state that production designer Bruce Curtis had to make few modifications so that it looked like a run-down home. The filmmakers had looked at 60 houses before settling on this one. Linklater shot a lot of exteriors in Anaheim, California and then composited them into the Austin footage in post-production. Since the live action footage was to be animated over later, makeup, lighting and visible equipment, like boom mics, were less of a concern. However, cinematographer Shane Kelly carefully composed shots and used a color palette with the animators in mind. Sometimes, they would show up to tell Kelly what they needed. Because the movie was being shot digitally and then animated, occasionally actors forgot they would later be animated as they worked through a scene. Robert Downey Jr. noted that he completely forgot the scene would later be animated as he worked through several takes in order to produce the smoke ring that would be featured in Barris' first closeup shot.

Extensive on-set footage of the filming of A Scanner Darkly was featured in a UK documentary about Richard Linklater directed by Irshad Ashraf and broadcast on Channel 4 in December 2004.

=== Animation ===
After principal photography was finished, the film was transferred to QuickTime for an 18-month animation process: second order magnified contrast separation. A Scanner Darkly was filmed digitally using the Panasonic AG-DVX100 and then animated with Rotoshop, a proprietary graphics editing program created by Bob Sabiston. Rotoshop uses an animation technique called interpolated rotoscope, which was previously used in Linklater's film Waking Life. Linklater discussed the ideas and inspiration behind his use of rotoscoping in Ashraf's documentary, linking it to his personal experiences of lucid dreaming. Rotoscoping in traditional cel animation originally involved tracing over film frame-by-frame. This is similar in some respects to the rotoscope style of filmmaker Ralph Bakshi. Rotoshop animation makes use of vector keyframes and interpolates the in-between frames automatically.

The animation phase was a trying process for Linklater who said, "I know how to make a movie, but I don't really know how to handle the animation." He had gone the animation route because he felt that there was very little animation targeted for adults.

=== Post-production problems ===
Originally, the film was supposed to be released in September 2005. Most of the animators were hired locally with only a few of them having movie-making experience. Six weeks into the animation process, only a few animated sequences were close to being completed while Linklater was off making Bad News Bears. Sabiston had divided the animators into five teams and split the work amongst them. However, there was poor communication between the teams, and the uniform animation style that Linklater wanted was not being implemented. After almost two months some animators were still learning the software, and Linklater became frustrated with the lack of progress.

Animation and training for the 30 new artists had begun October 28, 2004. In late November, Mark Gill, head of Warner Independent Pictures, asked for a status report. There were no finished sequences, as the majority of animators were still learning to implement the film's highly detailed style. Under pressure, some animators worked 18-hour days for two weeks in order to produce a trailer, which seemed to appease Gill and Linklater. Sabiston and his team were falling behind on the studio's 6-month animation schedule and asked that the schedule be extended to a year and that the 2 million dollar animation budget be enlarged accordingly. This created tension, and in January 2005, while Sabiston and his four-person core team were strategizing at a local cafe, Pallotta changed the locks and seized their workstations, replacing them with two local artists, Jason Archer and Paul Beck. Sabiston's four team leaders Patrick Thornton, Randy Cole, Katy O'Connor, and Jennifer Drummond subsequently received the credit "additional animation" in the film, despite having worked six months designing the general look of the animation and the scramble suit, hiring and training animators, and 3D compositing.

The studio increased the budget from $6.7 to $8.7 million and gave Linklater six months to finish the film. Pallotta took charge and instituted a more traditional Disney-esque production ethic that included a style manual, strict deadlines, and breaking the film up into smaller segments. The animation process lasted 15 months. Linklater said, in regard to the post-production problems, "There's a lot of misinformation out there... Changes took place during the early stages of us really getting going on this had everything to do with management and not art. It was a budgetary concern, essentially."

A test screening in December 2005 went reasonably well. A revised release date was set for March 31, 2006, but Gill felt that there would not be enough time to mount a proper promotional campaign and the date was changed to July 7, putting the film up against Pixar's Cars and Disney's Pirates of the Caribbean: Dead Man's Chest.

=== Music ===
The score (more than an hour's worth is in the film) was provided by Austin, Texas–based composer Graham Reynolds. Linklater approached Reynolds in 2003 after a club performance and suggested Reynolds create the score for A Scanner Darkly. Linklater and Reynolds had worked previously on Live from Shiva's Dance Floor, a 20-minute short featuring Timothy "Speed" Levitch.

The composition and recording process took over one and a half years (the unusual time allotment was due to the film's time-consuming animation process) and was done in Reynolds' east Austin home, in his bedroom. It is not a synthesized score; all the instruments except electric guitar and bass were acoustic, though many were transformed through effects. The film also includes clips of four Radiohead songs—"Fog", "Skttrbrain (Four Tet Mix)", "The Amazing Sounds of Orgy", "Pulk/Pull Revolving Doors" (although it appears uncredited)—and one Thom Yorke solo song, "Black Swan". An early test screening featured an all-Radiohead soundtrack.

The album is available from Lakeshore Records and includes the score by Graham Reynolds featuring the Golden Arm Trio. Additionally, the CD includes exclusive remixes of Graham's music by DJ Spooky and Jack Dangers (Meat Beat Manifesto). After finishing the film, Reynolds set to work on remixing the surround sound music into stereo. He then selected 44 minutes out of the film score in order to craft a listening CD while attempting to retain some feel of the arc of the film. Some of the shorter cues were assembled into longer CD tracks. The soundtrack to A Scanner Darkly was released on June 27, 2006.

== Reception ==
=== Box office ===
A Scanner Darkly opened in 17 theaters and grossed $391,672 in its first weekend for a per-theater average of $23,039. The film saw some expansion in later weeks, but ultimately was about $1 million short of earning back its $8.7 million production budget. It grossed $5.5 million in North America and $2.1 million elsewhere.

=== Critical response ===
A Scanner Darkly was met with generally positive reviews. 68% of 189 reviews compiled by Rotten Tomatoes are positive. The critics' consensus on the website reads, "A faithful adaptation of Philip K. Dick's novel, A Scanner Darkly takes the viewer on a visual and mind-blowing journey into the author's conception of a drug-addled and politically unstable world." Its weighted score on Metacritic is 73 out of 100, based on 33 critics, indicating "generally favorable" reviews.

Manohla Dargis of The New York Times wrote that the film "has a kind of hypnotic visual appeal." Carina Chocano of the Los Angeles Times found the film "engrossing," and wrote, "the brilliance of [the film] is how it suggests, without bombast or fanfare, the ways in which the real world has come to resemble the dark world of comic books." In his review for The Village Voice, J. Hoberman wrote, "What's extraordinary about Linklater's animation, computer-rotoscoped in the fashion of his 2001 Waking Life, is just how tangible the Dickian labyrinth becomes," and praised Robert Downey Jr.'s performance: "Midway through 2006, this supporting turn is the performance to beat in what seems the year's American movie to beat."

Andrew Sarris, in his review for The New York Observer, wrote, "Mr. Linklater emerges once again as the Austin auteur par excellence". Empire magazine's Kim Newman gave the film four stars out of five and wrote, "its intelligence makes it near-essential viewing."

In his review for The Washington Post, Desson Thompson wrote, "Linklater's rotoscoping process underscores this grave new world with pop-arty creepiness. Its dramatically muting effect, which shaves the highs off the more histrionic performances, yet doesn't undercut the more subtle elements ... squeezes everything into a unified nightmare." Amy Biancolli from the Houston Chronicle heralded the movie as "[t]he first film to capture the author's transience and his art."

Entertainment Weekly gave the film a "C−" rating, and Owen Gleiberman was unimpressed, writing that the film is "more fun to think about than [it] is to experience," and found the film's storyline "goes nowhere." In his review for The Guardian, Peter Bradshaw wrote, "The movie is often startling and engrossing, but the question of what the heck is going on, and why, is never entirely absent from your mind." Jack Mathews, in his review for The New York Daily News, called it "a murky, dialogue-heavy tale of intrigue."

Roger Moore from the Orlando Sentinel states: "Linklater's willingness to experiment ... is laudable. But I'm not sure he's reinventing animation here, or even adequately serving that older-than-children animation audience." Tom Long from the Detroit News praised one aspect of the film, saying "[h]ere's a guy willing to take risks, willing to tackle challenging material, willing to assume his audience has a brain." At the same time, Long notes that "[u]nfortunately, his audience's collective brain is going to be hurting mightily for the first hour of this film". Michael Booth from the Denver Post states that "[t]he artiness gets in the way of thrilling plot twists; we're still trying to sort out images when we should be sorting out facts." Chris Vognar from the Dallas Morning News stated that "[m]uch like someone who doesn't realize how high he is, A Scanner Darkly talks too much and doesn't say enough".

=== Home media ===
The DVD was released in North America on December 19, 2006, and in the UK on January 22, 2007; Blu ray and HD DVD versions were released on April 10, 2007, and May 10, 2010. The following extras are included: the theatrical trailer; "Weight of the Line", an animation tales feature; "One Summer in Austin", a short documentary on the filming of the movie; and audio commentary from actor Keanu Reeves, director Richard Linklater, producer Tommy Pallotta, author Jonathan Lethem, and Philip K. Dick's daughter, Isa Dick Hackett. Entertainment Weekly felt that the commentary track was "friendly and aimless", but found the featurette on the rotoscoping process, "a lot more lively".

== Legacy ==
The film has garnered a cult following over the years. The A.V. Club has called it "the greatest adaptation of Dick’s work." Inverse called it one of the most underrated Dick adaptations and "the right movie for our times." Looper called it "an excellent film" and put it in the top ten Philip K. Dick adaptations.

Keanu Reeves named it as one of his favorite film projects.

== See also ==
- List of adaptations of works by Philip K. Dick
- List of films featuring surveillance
- List of films featuring hallucinogens
- List of animated feature films
