= Richard Linklater =

American filmmaker (born 1960)

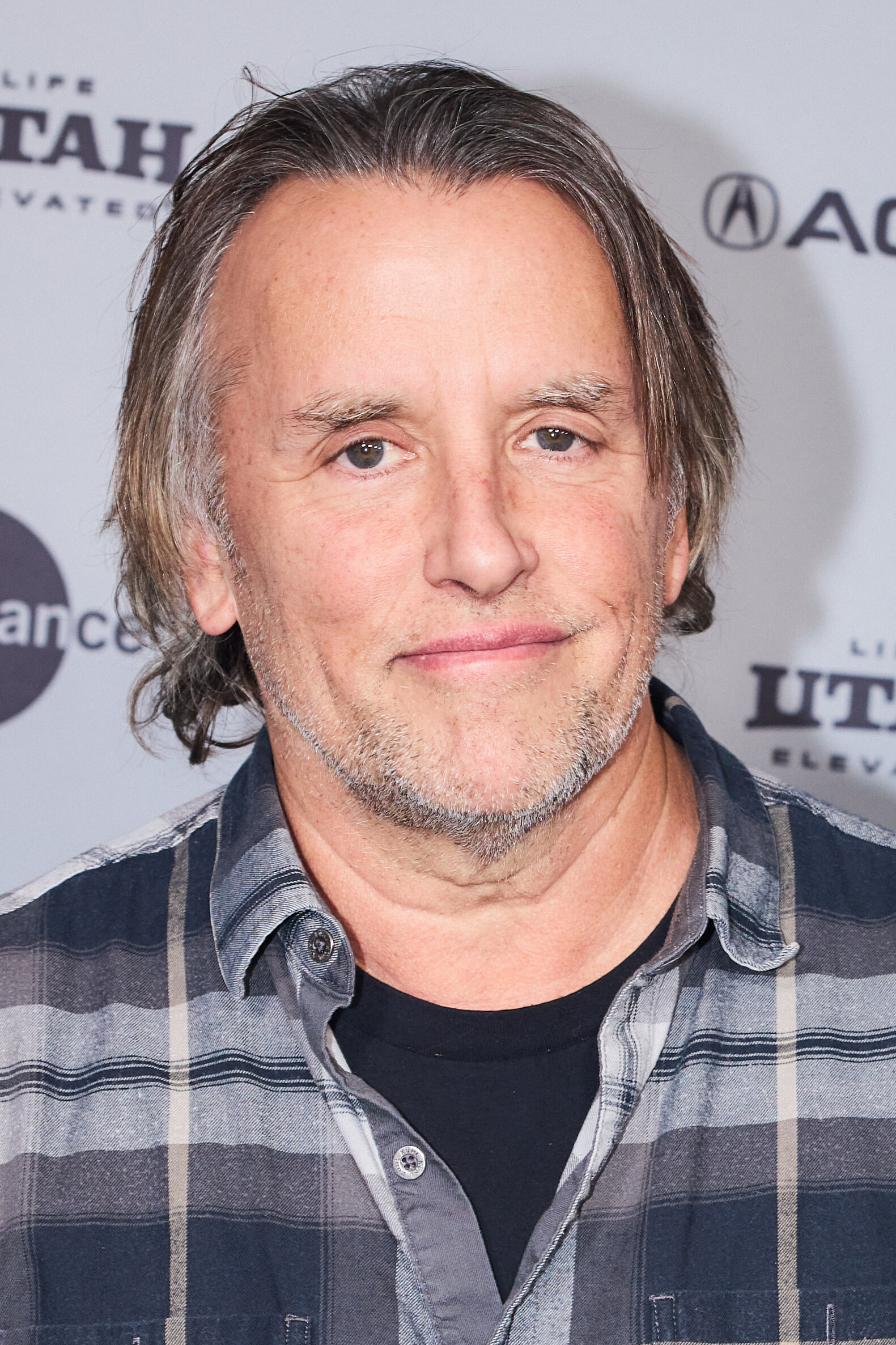
- Linklater in 2026
- Born: Richard Linklater; July 30, 1960 (age 66); Houston, Texas, U.S.
- Occupations: Film director; producer; screenwriter
- Years active: 1985–present
- Spouse: Christina Harrison
- Children: 3, including Lorelei
- Awards: Full list
- Website: detourfilm.com

Richard Linklater (/ˈlɪnkleɪtər/; born July 30, 1960) is an American filmmaker. He is known for making films which deal thematically with suburban culture and the effects of the passage of time. His accolades include a Golden Globe Award, a Silver Bear, a César Award, and five Academy Award nominations.

His films include the comedies Slacker (1990) and Dazed and Confused (1993); the romance films Before trilogy (1995–2013); the music-themed comedy School of Rock (2003); the adult animated films Waking Life (2001), A Scanner Darkly (2006), and Apollo 10½: A Space Age Childhood (2022); the coming-of-age drama Boyhood (2014); the comedy film Everybody Wants Some!! (2016); the action romantic comedy Hit Man (2023); and the biographical films Blue Moon (2025) and Nouvelle Vague (2025).

Many of Linklater's films are noted for their loosely structured narratives. The Before trilogy and Boyhood both feature the same actors filmed over an extended period of years. In 2015, Linklater was named to the annual Time 100 list of the most influential people in the world. Slacker and Before Sunrise have been inducted into the National Film Registry.

== Early life ==
Linklater was born in Houston. He attended Huntsville High School in Huntsville, Texas, during grades 9–11, where he played football coached by Joe Clements as a backup quarterback for the #1 ranked team in the state. For his senior year, he moved to Bellaire High School in Bellaire, Texas, because he was better at baseball than football and Bellaire had a better baseball coach. As a teen he won a Scholastic Art and Writing Award.

Linklater studied at Sam Houston State University in Huntsville, Texas (where he also played baseball), until dropping out to work on an offshore oil rig in the Gulf of Mexico. He frequently read novels on the rig, and upon returning to land, developed a love of film through repeated visits to a repertory cinema in Houston. At that point, he realized he wanted to be a filmmaker. He used his savings to buy a Super-8 camera, a projector, and editing equipment, and moved to Austin.

== Career ==
=== 1985–1999: Early directing ===
Linklater founded the Austin Film Society in 1985 with his college professor Chale Nafus, University of Texas professor Charles Ramirez-Berg, SXSW founder Louis Black, and his frequent collaborator Lee Daniel. One of the mentors for the Film Society was former New York City critic for the SoHo Weekly News George Morris, who had moved to Austin and taught film there. For several years, Linklater made many short films which were exercises and experiments in film techniques. He finally completed his first feature, It's Impossible to Learn to Plow by Reading Books (which is available in The Criterion Collection edition of his second feature, Slacker), a Super-8 feature that took a year to shoot and another year to edit. Linklater created Detour Filmproduction (a homage to the 1945 low budget film noir by Edgar G. Ulmer), and subsequently made Slacker for only $23,000. It grossed more than $1.25 million. The film shows an aimless day in the life of the city of Austin, Texas, showcasing its more eccentric characters.

While gaining a cult following in the independent film world, he made his third film, Dazed and Confused, based on his years at Huntsville High School and the people he encountered there. The film garnered critical praise and grossed $8 million in the United States while becoming a hit on VHS. This film was also responsible for the breakout of fellow Texas native Matthew McConaughey. In 1995, Linklater won the Silver Bear for Best Director for the film Before Sunrise at the 45th Berlin International Film Festival. His next feature, subUrbia, had mixed reviews critically, and did very poorly at the box office. In 1998, he took on his first Hollywood feature, The Newton Boys, which received mixed reviews while tanking at the box office.

=== 2000–2013: Wider recognition ===
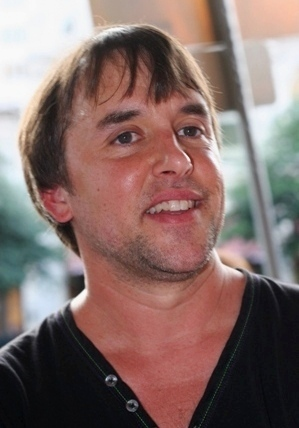
Linklater in 2007

With the rotoscope films Waking Life and A Scanner Darkly, and his mainstream comedies, School of Rock and the remake of Bad News Bears, he gained wider recognition. In 2003, he wrote and directed a pilot for HBO with Rodney Rothman called $5.15/hr, about several minimum wage restaurant workers. The pilot deals with themes later examined in Fast Food Nation. The British television network Channel 4 produced a documentary about Linklater, in which the filmmaker discussed the personal and philosophical ideas behind his films. St Richard of Austin was presented by Ben Lewis and directed by Irshad Ashraf and broadcast on Channel 4 in December 2004 in the UK. Linklater was nominated for an Academy Award for Best Adapted Screenplay for his film Before Sunset.

Waking Life and A Scanner Darkly both used rotoscoping animation techniques. Working with Bob Sabiston and Sabiston's program Rotoshop to create this effect, Linklater shot and edited both movies completely as live-action features, then employed a team of artists to "trace over" individual frames. The result is a distinctive "semi-real" quality, praised by such critics as Roger Ebert (in the case of Waking Life) as being original and well-suited to the aims of the film. Fast Food Nation (2006) is an adaptation of the best selling book that examines the local and global influence of the United States fast food industry. The film was entered into the 2006 Cannes Film Festival before being released in North America on November 17, 2006, and in Europe on March 23, 2007. The film received mixed reviews. Linklater fared better with the critics with A Scanner Darkly (released in the same year), Me and Orson Welles (2009), and Bernie (2011).

He was nominated for an Academy Award for Best Adapted Screenplay for Before Midnight, the third film in the Before... trilogy.

=== 2014–present: Boyhood and other works ===
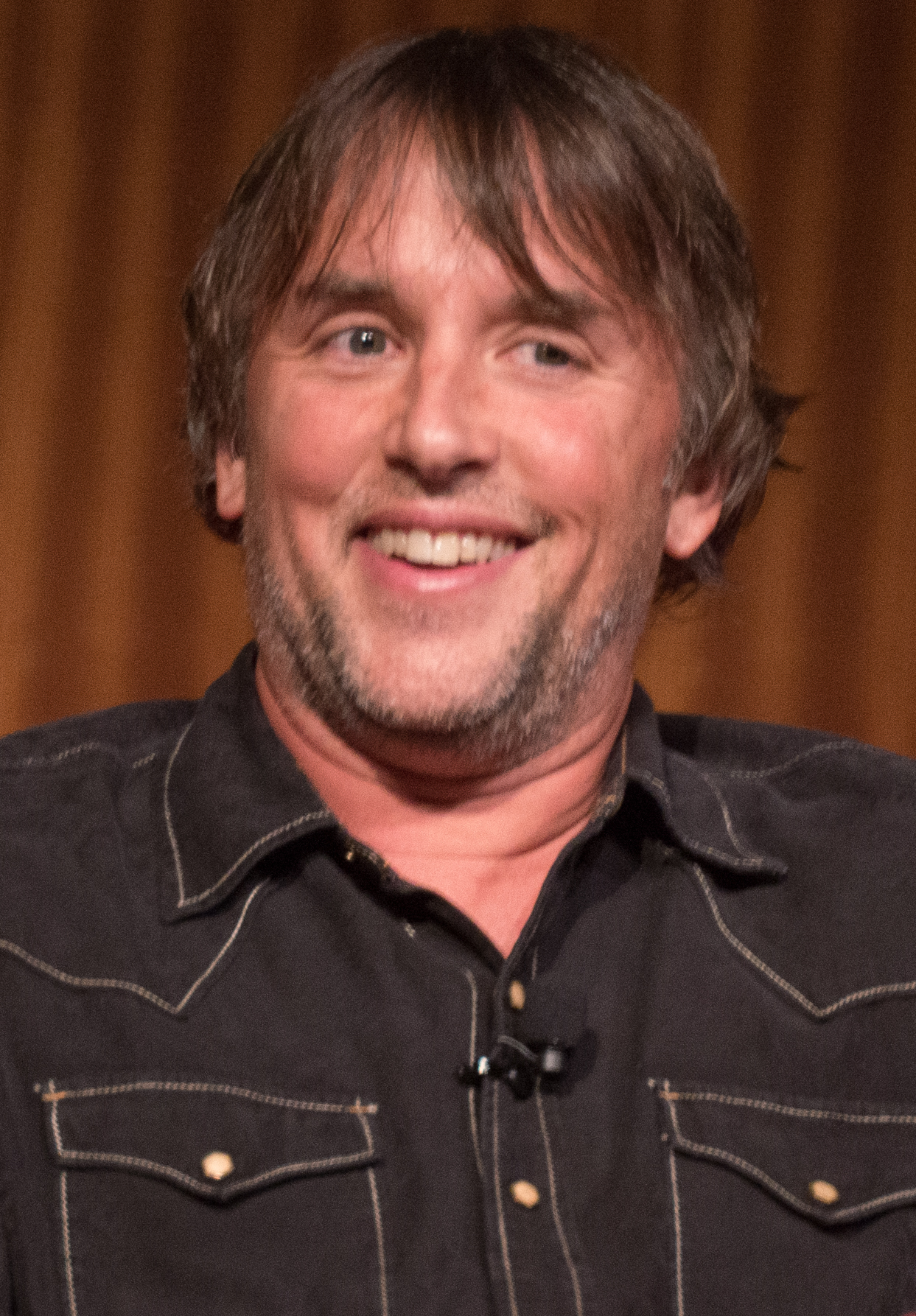
Linklater in 2015

In 2014 he released the film Boyhood, which had been 12 years in the making. Boyhood received overwhelming critical acclaim. Linklater won the Golden Globes, Critics' Choice Movie Awards, and BAFTAs for Best Director and Best Picture. He also received his first nomination for the Academy Award for Best Director, along with nominations for Best Original Screenplay and Best Picture. For a while Linklater was attached to direct a remake of The Incredible Mr. Limpet for Warner Bros. However, he dropped the project in favor of working on a spiritual successor to Dazed and Confused, titled Everybody Wants Some!!, with backing from Annapurna Pictures and Paramount distributing the film in North America. The film was released in March 2016 and was well received by critics, but it failed to recoup its budget of 10 million dollars, grossing only 4.6 million.

In the second half of the 2010s, Linklater wrote and directed the drama film Last Flag Flying, starring Bryan Cranston, Laurence Fishburne, and Steve Carell. A sequel to Hal Ashby's 1973 film The Last Detail, it began filming in November 2016, and was released on November 3, 2017. Linklater then directed Where'd You Go, Bernadette, based on the novel by Maria Semple and produced by Annapurna Pictures. He was attached to direct an adaptation of Graeme Simsion's novel The Rosie Project which would have starred Jennifer Lawrence in the lead role, but he dropped out of directing when Lawrence quit the project. In 2019, it was announced that Linklater would be filming an adaptation of Stephen Sondheim's musical Merrily We Roll Along. Like Boyhood, it will be filmed over the course of several years, but, like the musical and the play it is based on, will be presented in reverse chronology. In 2024, Linklater directed an episode of God Save Texas for HBO, focusing on the prison industrial complex in Huntsville, Texas.

He directed the action romantic comedy Hit Man starring Glen Powell and Adria Arjona. The film premiered at the 80th Venice International Film Festival in 2023 where it received critical acclaim and was picked up for distribution by Netflix and released in 2024. In 2025, he directed the biographical film Blue Moon revolving around Lorenz Hart and the opening night of Rodgers and Hammerstein's musical Oklahoma! which starred Ethan Hawke, Andrew Scott, and Margaret Qualley. The film premiered at the 75th Berlin International Film Festival to positive reviews. In the same year his film, Nouvelle Vague about the shooting of the French New Wave film Breathless directed by Jean-Luc Godard, premiered at the 2025 Cannes Film Festival. In late 2025, both Nouvelle Vague and Blue Moon got nominated for Best Motion Picture – Musical or Comedy at 83rd Golden Globe Awards. For Nouvelle Vague, Linklater won the César Award for Best Director.

In early 2025, Linklater revealed plans for a long-gestating 19th-century American "hangout" film centered on the Transcendentalist movement, featuring figures such as Ralph Waldo Emerson, Henry David Thoreau, and Margaret Fuller. In January 2026, Ethan Hawke confirmed the project was moving forward, with filming scheduled for 2026 and a likely festival debut in 2027. In July 2026, it was reported that Linklater would be directing a biopic on Lou Gehrig starring Glen Powell, with Lorne Michaels joining as producer. Concurrently, Linklater continues work on Merrily We Roll Along, an ambitious multi-decade project begun in 2019 that films its cast periodically through 2040 to capture their natural aging.

== Style and influences ==
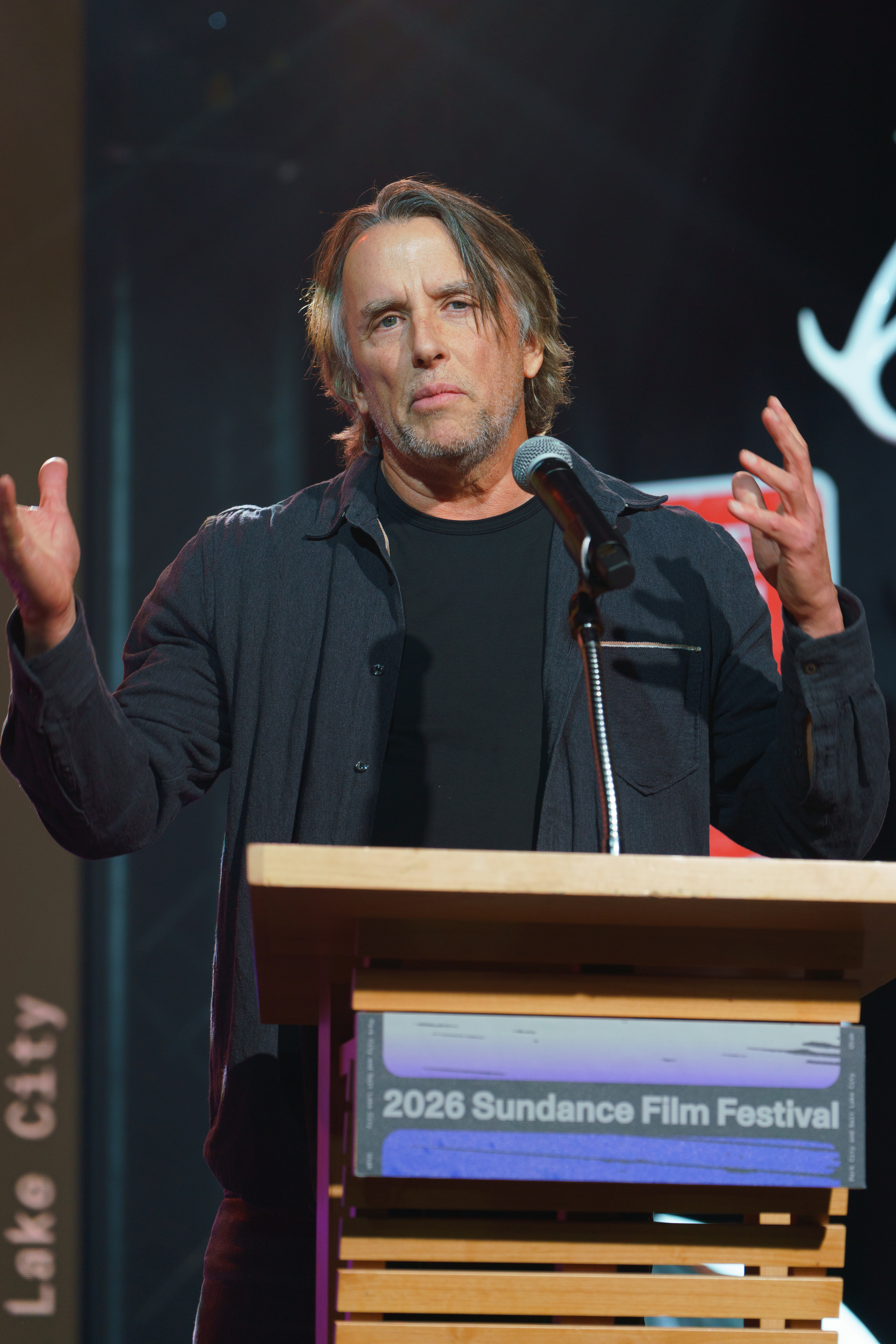
Linklater at the 2026 Sundance Film Festival

Inspiration for Linklater's work was largely based on his experience viewing the film Raging Bull.

It made me see movies as a potential outlet for what I was thinking about and hoping to express. At that point I was an unformed artist. At that moment, something was simmering in me, but Raging Bull brought it to a boil.

He was also influenced by Robert Bresson, Yasujirō Ozu, Rainer Werner Fassbinder, Éric Rohmer, François Truffaut, Josef Von Sternberg, and Carl Theodor Dreyer. Many of Linklater's films including Slacker, Dazed and Confused, Tape, and all three installments of the Before Trilogy, take place in a single day. They are less plot-driven than about human interactions. His films often prioritize character, mood, and philosophical inquiry, allowing scenes to unfold in real time or within compressed temporal frames.

Much of Linklater’s work is driven by conversation and philosophical inquiry. Films such as Slacker, the Before trilogy, Waking Life, and Tape rely heavily on extended dialogue to explore themes of identity, time, morality, relationships, and personal belief systems. Dialogue in these films functions as the primary dramatic engine, with characters using conversation as a means of self-examination and connection. More recent works such as Blue Moon continue this approach, reinforcing Linklater’s interest in cinema as a space for ideas, reflection, and human interaction.

Linklater has also experimented extensively with animation, particularly rotoscoping, using it as a tool for memory, subjectivity, and philosophical inquiry. Waking Life (2001) employs animation to explore dreams, consciousness, and existential thought, while A Scanner Darkly (2006) uses the technique to mirror paranoia, identity fracture, and altered perception. In Apollo 10½: A Space Age Childhood (2022), Linklater blends rotoscoped animation with autobiographical nostalgia, evoking childhood memory and the cultural atmosphere of the 1960s space race through a subjective, recollective lens.

He is known for a rehearsal-intensive, text-driven approach to filmmaking, believing that extensive preparation enables spontaneity and emotional precision on set. Rather than relying on improvisation during shooting, Linklater treats rehearsal as a central creative process, fostering collaboration and ensemble dynamics. This method has contributed to performances that feel casual and unforced while being carefully constructed beneath the surface. Frequent collaborator Ethan Hawke has likened Linklater’s process to that of Sidney Lumet, stating that rehearsal is non-negotiable for the director and the primary space where creativity, ensemble dynamics, and performance are forged.

=== Favourite films ===
Linklater participated in the 2022 Sight and Sound Directors' Poll, which is held once every ten years for contemporary filmmakers to select their ten favourite films in no particular order. His selections were: Some Came Running (1958), Goodfellas (1990), L'Argent (1983), Barry Lyndon (1975), The Godfather (1972), Fanny and Alexander (1982), Nashville (1975), La Maman et la Putain (1973), The Last Picture Show (1971) and Citizen Kane (1941).

== Personal life ==
Linklater lives in Austin, Texas, and refuses to live or work in Hollywood for any extended period of time. He does not maintain an active presence on any social media platform. He is openly outspoken about how social media, technology, and the constant influx of digital content is diminishing the cultural space for cinema and deep artistic appreciation, with people viewing films as "content" rather than meaningful art. He also avoids sharing political opinions, calling his unfiltered political thoughts "brain snot" and seeing little value in sharing them publicly.

Christina Harrison has been his partner since the 1990s. They had a daughter in 1994, and twin girls in 2004. The eldest, Lorelei Linklater, co-starred in Boyhood as the sister of the main character.

Linklater has been a vegetarian since his early 20s. In 2015, he explained the dietary lifestyle in a Boyhood-style documentary for People for the Ethical Treatment of Animals.

== Filmography ==
Key
†	Denotes productions that have not yet been released

=== Feature films ===
Year	Title	Director	Writer	Producer	Notes
1988	It's Impossible to Learn to Plow by Reading Books	Yes	Yes	Yes	Also actor
1990	Slacker	Yes	Yes	Yes	Also actor
1993	Dazed and Confused	Yes	Yes	Yes	
1995	Before Sunrise	Yes	Yes	No	Co-written with Kim Krizan
1996	SubUrbia	Yes	No	No	
1998	The Newton Boys	Yes	Yes	No	Co-written with Claude Stanush and Clark Lee Walker
2001	Waking Life	Yes	Yes	No	Also cinematographer and actor
2001	Tape	Yes	No	No	
2003	School of Rock	Yes	No	No	
2004	Before Sunset	Yes	Yes	No	Co-written with Julie Delpy, Ethan Hawke and Kim Krizan
2005	Bad News Bears	Yes	No	Yes	
2006	A Scanner Darkly	Yes	Yes	No	
2006	Fast Food Nation	Yes	Yes	No	Co-written with Eric Schlosser
2008	Me and Orson Welles	Yes	No	Yes	
2011	Bernie	Yes	Yes	Yes	Co-written with Skip Hollandsworth
2013	Before Midnight	Yes	Yes	Yes	Co-written with Ethan Hawke and Julie Delpy
2014	Boyhood	Yes	Yes	Yes	
2016	Everybody Wants Some!!	Yes	Yes	Yes	
2017	Last Flag Flying	Yes	Yes	Yes	Co-written with Darryl Ponicsan
2019	Where'd You Go, Bernadette	Yes	Yes	No	Co-written with Holly Gent and Vince Palmo
2022	Apollo 10½: A Space Age Childhood	Yes	Yes	Yes	
2023	Hit Man	Yes	Yes	Yes	Co-written with Glen Powell
2025	Blue Moon	Yes	No	Yes	
2025	Nouvelle Vague	Yes	No	No	
TBA	Merrily We Roll Along †	Yes	Yes	Yes	Filming, until at least 2040

==== Acting roles ====
Year	Title	Role	Notes
1988	It's Impossible to Learn to Plow by Reading Books	Unnamed character	
1990	Slacker	"Should Have Stayed at the Bus Station"	
1995	The Underneath	Ember Doorman	
1995	Before Sunrise	Foosball player	
1996	Beavis and Butt-Head Do America	Tour Bus Driver	Voice role
1998	Scotch and Milk	Cab Passenger	
2001	Spy Kids	Cool Spy	
2001	Chelsea Walls	Crony #2	
2001	Waking Life	Pinball Playing Man / Man on Back of Boat	
2006	The Hottest State	John Wayne Enthusiast	
2008	RSO (Registered Sex Offender)	Principal Mallard	
2018	Blaze	Oilman #3	
2019	Another Day at the Office	Rick	

=== Short films ===
Year	Title	Director	Writer	Producer
1985	Woodshock	Yes	No	No
2003	Live from Shiva's Dance Floor	Yes	No	No
2019	Another Day at the Office	Yes	Yes	Yes

=== Television ===
Year	Title	Director	Writer	Producer	Notes
2004	$5.15/Hr.	Yes	Yes	Yes	TV pilot
2012	Up to Speed	Yes	Yes	Yes	
2016–2018	School of Rock	No	No	Executive	
2020	That Animal Rescue Show	Yes	No	Executive	Directed 2 Episodes
2024	God Save Texas	Yes	No	Executive	Episode: "Hometown Prison"

=== Other works ===
Year	Title	Director	Writer	Producer	Notes
1991	Heads I Win/Tails You Lose	Yes	Yes	Yes	Experimental video project
2008	Inning by Inning: A Portrait of a Coach	Yes	No	No	Documentary film
2015	I Dream Too Much	No	No	Executive	

== Reception ==
=== Critical reception ===
Film	Rotten Tomatoes	Metacritic
Slacker	85%	69
Dazed and Confused	94%	78
Before Sunrise	100%	77
SubUrbia	64%	62
The Newton Boys	62%	57
Waking Life	80%	82
Tape	78%	71
School of Rock	92%	82
Before Sunset	95%	90
Bad News Bears	48%	65
A Scanner Darkly	69%	73
Fast Food Nation	50%	64
Me and Orson Welles	85%	73
Bernie	90%	75
Before Midnight	98%	94
Boyhood	97%	100
Everybody Wants Some!!	88%	83
Last Flag Flying	73%	65
Where'd You Go, Bernadette	48%	51
Apollo 10 1/2: A Space Age Childhood	91%	79
Hit Man	95%	82
Blue Moon	90%	78
Nouvelle Vague	90%	76
Average	80.4%	73

=== Box office ===
Film	Release date	Revenue			Budget	Ref.
Film	Release date	United States	Outside US	Worldwide	Budget	Ref.
Slacker	July 27, 1990	$1,228,208	—N/a	$1,228,208	$23,000	
Dazed and Confused	September 24, 1993	$7,993,039	—N/a	$7,993,039	$6,900,000	
Before Sunrise	January 27, 1995	$5,535,405	—N/a	$5,535,405	$2,500,000	
SubUrbia	February 7, 1997	$656,747	—N/a	$656,747	—N/a	
The Newton Boys	March 27, 1998	$10,452,012	—N/a	$10,452,012	$27,000,000	
Waking Life	October 19, 2001	$2,901,447	$275,433	$3,176,880	—N/a	
Tape	November 2, 2001	$490,475	$25,425	$515,900	$100,000	
School of Rock	October 3, 2003	$81,261,177	$50,021,772	$131,282,949	$35,000,000	
Before Sunset	July 2, 2004	$5,820,649	$10,171,966	$15,992,615	$2,700,000	
Bad News Bears	July 22, 2005	$32,868,349	$1,384,498	$34,252,847	$35,000,000	
A Scanner Darkly	July 7, 2006	$5,501,616	$2,158,302	$7,659,918	$8,700,000	
Fast Food Nation	November 17, 2006	$1,005,539	$1,203,783	$2,209,322	—N/a	
Me and Orson Welles	November 25, 2009	$1,190,003	$1,146,169	$2,336,172	$25,000,000	
Bernie	April 27, 2012	$9,206,470	$884,171	$10,090,641	$6,000,000	
Before Midnight	May 24, 2013	$8,114,627	$3,061,842	$23,376,973	$3,000,000	
Boyhood	July 11, 2014	$25,352,281	$22,785,385	$48,137,666	$4,000,000	
Total		$198,132,207	$89,476,361	$287,608,568	$155,923,000	

== Awards and nominations ==
Year	Title	Academy Awards		BAFTA Awards		Golden Globe Awards	
Year	Title	Nominations	Wins	Nominations	Wins	Nominations	Wins
2003	School of Rock					1	
2004	Before Sunset	1					
2008	Me and Orson Welles			1			
2011	Bernie					1	
2013	Before Midnight	1				1	
2014	Boyhood	6	1	5	3	5	3
2019	Where'd You Go, Bernadette					1	
2023	Hit Man					1	
2025	Blue Moon	2				2	
2025	Nouvelle Vague					1	
Total		10	1	6	3	13	3

Directed Academy Award performances
Under Linklater's direction, these actors have received the Academy Award nominations and wins for their performances in their respective roles.

Year	Performer	Film	Result
Academy Award for Best Actor
2025	Ethan Hawke	Blue Moon	Nominated
Academy Award for Best Supporting Actor
2014	Ethan Hawke	Boyhood	Nominated
Academy Award for Best Supporting Actress
2014	Patricia Arquette	Boyhood	Won
