= Texas Film Hall of Fame =

Coordinates: 30°16′02″N 97°44′35″W

The Texas Film Hall of Fame honors Texans who have made a significant contribution to film or filmmaking, as well as non-Texans who have made significant strides in the advancement of the Texan film industry. Classic Texas films are also honored, with a member of the cast or crew accepting on behalf of their colleagues. New inductees are announced at the annual Texas Film Awards, organised by the Austin Film Society.

The Hall of Fame and associated awards ceremony were co-founded in 2001 by Louis Black, the editor of The Austin Chronicle, and Evan Smith, Editor-In-Chief and CEO of The Texas Tribune and former editor of Texas Monthly.

== Awards gala ==
For its first 11 years, the gala celebration was held at Austin Studios, the site of the city's onetime municipal airport, now converted into film production studios. In 2012, the Awards were held in downtown Austin at ACL Live at The Moody Theater. From 2013 to 2017 the awards were once again held at Austin Studios, before moving to the newly opened AFS Cinema in 2018.

From 2002 to 2005 the gala was emceed by Ann Richards, the former governor of Texas, who died on September 13, 2006. The 2007 gala commemorated her death by celebrating her life and her passion for film, emceed by New York columnist and 2001 inductee Liz Smith. Other galas have been emceed by Turk Pipkin, Evan Smith, Dan Rather, Thomas Haden Church, Wyatt Cenac, Anjelah Johnson, Dana Wheeler-Nicholson, Luke Wilson, Mike Judge and Louis Black.

The 2003 ceremony included a tribute to Eagle Pennell, presented by Kit Carson. In 2016 Variety Executive Editor Steven Gaydos and the Austin Film Society's Founder and Artistic Director Richard Linklater presented a tribute to mark the AFS's 30th anniversary.

The awards ceremonies include various other presentations, such as inducting new members to the Hall of Fame. The specific awards presented differs each year, but common ones include the Rising Star Award, the Honorary Texan Award and the Ann Richards Award. The Warren Skaaren Lifetime Achievement Award has been presented on three occasions: Mike Simpson (2001), Jack Valenti (2002) and Michael Nesmith (2010).

=== Film awards ===
Between 2002 and 2015 each ceremony also honored a classic Texan film, initially with the Frontier Award and later by the Star of Texas and Creative Impact in Cinema awards. These awards were accepted by one or more members of the film's cast or crew.

- 2002: Giant (accepted by Dennis Hopper)
- 2003: Easy Rider (accepted by Peter Fonda)
- 2004: The Getaway (accepted by Ali MacGraw)
- 2005: Written on the Wind (accepted by Lauren Bacall)
- 2006: The Last Picture Show (accepted by Cybill Shepherd)
- 2007: State Fair (accepted by Ann-Margret)
- 2008: Urban Cowboy (accepted by Debra Winger)
- 2009: Rushmore (accepted by Luke Wilson)
- 2010: Waiting for Guffman (accepted by Catherine O'Hara)
- 2011: Friday Night Lights (accepted by Connie Britton and Kyle Chandler with Ernest James, Brad Leland, Jesse Plemons, Scott Porter and Dana Wheeler-Nicholson)
- 2012: Rio Bravo (accepted by Angie Dickinson)
- 2013: Dazed and Confused (accepted by Parker Posey and Richard Linklater)
- 2014: From Dusk Till Dawn (accepted by Robert Rodriguez, Fred Williamson, Tom Savini, Greg Nicotero and Danny Trejo)
- 2015: Boyhood (accepted by director Richard Linklater and stars Patricia Arquette and Ellar Coltrane)

== List of Hall of Fame members ==
Each ceremony includes the induction of several new members to the Texas Film Hall of Fame.

2001

- Robert Benton (presented by Anne Rapp)
- Liz Smith (presented by Ann Richards)
- Sissy Spacek (presented by Rip Torn)
- William D. Wittliff (presented by Barbara Morgan)

2002

- William Broyles Jr. (presented by Bill Wittliff)
- Cyd Charisse (presented by Peter Bogdanovich)
- Terrence Malick (presented by Sissy Spacek)
- Willie Nelson (presented by Lyle Lovett and Billy Gibbons)

2003

- Farrah Fawcett (presented by Dabney Coleman)
- Horton Foote (presented by Tess Harper)
- Woody Harrelson (presented by Matthew McConaughey)
- Tobe Hooper (presented by William Friedkin)

2004

- Ethan Hawke (presented by Richard Linklater)
- Judith Ivey (presented by Treat Williams)
- Edwin "Bud" Shrake (presented by Dennis Hopper)
- Forest Whitaker (presented by Jonathan Demme)

2005

- Irma P. Hall (presented by Joel Coen and Ethan Coen)
- Marcia Gay Harden (presented by Joe Pantoliano)
- Dennis Quaid (presented by Billy Bob Thornton)

2006

- Kris Kristofferson (presented by John Sayles)
- Matthew McConaughey (presented by S.R. Bindler)
- JoBeth Williams (presented by Lawrence Kasdan)

2007

- Richard Linklater (presented by John Sloss)
- Bill Paxton (presented by Stephen Bruton)
- Betty Buckley (presented by Phyllis George)

2008

- Morgan Fairchild (presented by Tess Harper)

2009

- Larry Hagman (presented by Linda Gray)
- Powers Boothe (presented by Keith Carradine)

2010

- Lukas Haas (presented by Lyle Lovett)
- Bruce McGill (presented by Tim Matheson)

2011

- Rip Torn
- Renée Zellweger (presented by Liz Smith)

2012

- Barry Corbin (presented by G.W. Bailey)
- Douglas McGrath (presented by Caroline Rhea)
- Meat Loaf (presented by Brett Cullen)

2013

- Stephen Tobolowsky (presented by Julie Hagerty)
- Robin Wright (presented by Rob Reiner)
- Annette O'Toole (presented by Michael McKean)
- Henry Thomas (presented by Sissy Spacek and Jack Fisk)

2014

- Mac Davis (presented by Priscilla Presley)
- Amber Heard (presented by Ryan Kavanaugh)
- David Gordon Green (presented by Danny McBride)
- Louis Black (presented by Richard Linklater and Steven Gaydos)

2015

- Tommy Lee Jones (presented by Bill Wittliff)
- Bonnie Curtis (presented by Jess Weixler)
- Guillermo del Toro (presented by Robert Rodriguez)
- Luke Wilson (accepted by Charles Attal)
- L.M. Kit Carson (posthumous) (presented by Louis Black)
- Christopher Evan Welch (posthumous) (presented by Mike Judge)

2016

- Carol Burnett (presented by Maya Rudolph)
- Chandra Wilson (presented by Ellia English)

2017

- Shirley MacLaine (presented by Richard Linklater)
- Jeff Nichols (presented by Michael Shannon)
- Sarah Green (presented by Nick Kroll)
- Bill Paxton (posthumous tribute)
- Debbie Reynolds (posthumous tribute)

2018

- John McCall (presented by Kinky Friedman)

2019

- John Lee Hancock (presented by (Kathy Bates)

== Other awards ==
=== Legacy Award ===
- 2002: Gilbert Roland (presented by Cheech Marin)
- 2003: Dooley Wilson (presented by Anna Deavere Smith)
- 2008: Jayne Mansfield (accepted by Mariska Hargitay)

=== Rising Star Award ===
- 2003: Owen Wilson (presented by Luke Wilson)
- 2005: Robert Rodriguez (presented by George Lopez)
- 2011: John Hawkes
- 2016: Jesse Plemons (presented by Adrianne Palicki)
- 2017: Tye Sheridan (presented by David Gordon Green)
- 2019: Brooklyn Decker (presented by June Diane Raphael)

=== Honorary Texan Award ===
- 2004: Robert Duvall (presented by Elvis Mitchell)
- 2009: Billy Bob Thornton (presented by Dennis Quaid)
- 2010: Quentin Tarantino (presented by Richard Linklater)
- 2012: Danny Trejo (presented by Robert Rodriguez)

=== AMD Live! Soundtrack Award ===
- 2006: Lyle Lovett (presented by Anne Rapp and Charlie Boswell of AMD)
- 2007: Soundtrack Award: The Dixie Chicks (presented by Lance Armstrong)
- 2008: ZZ Top (presented by Luke Wilson)

=== Ann Richards Award ===
- 2007: Elizabeth Avellan
- 2008: Mike Judge
- 2009: Catherine Hardwicke (presented by Brendan Fraser)

=== Champion of the Arts ===
- 2016: Michael Barker (presented by Ethan Hawke)
- 2017: Hector Galán (presented by Henry Cisneros)

=== Jonathan Demme Award ===
- 2018: Paul Thomas Anderson presented by Richard Linklater

=== Variety One to Acclaim Award ===
- 2018: Armie Hammer presented by Timothée Chalamet

=== Star of Texas Award ===
- 2019: Office Space 20th Anniversary Reunion with director Mike Judge and cast including Gary Cole, David Herman, and Ajay Naidu

== Sponsored films ==
- Vallam Kali
- Shark Cowboys
- On Dying of Dementia in a Capitalist System
- A Strike And an Uprising
- Also Starring Austin
- South of Marfa
- Bagatelle
- Born With It
- Building The American Dream
- Come And Take It: The Jessica Jin Story
- Event of the Season
- Women in Film and Television - Austin
- Experimental Response Cinema
- Good 'Ol Girl
- I'm Gonna Make You Love Me
- Raising Aniya
- The Incident at the Bellwood Schoolhouse
- Call her Ganda
- Becoming Leslie
- Living Springs
- Good Night Blues: The Donn's Depot Story
- Major
- Fighting Fair
- 100 Ways to Catch the Wind
- Porvenir, Texas
- Foxy Trot
- Seadrift
- Seekers
- The Sensitives
- Caballerango
- Speak For Me
- Stumped
- Untitled Israeli Football Project
- Vinyl Generation
- When We Were Live
