= Austin Film Society =

Non-profit organization in the USA

- Location: Austin, Texas, U.S.
- Founded: 1985; 41 years ago
- Founded by: Richard Linklater
- Website: austinfilm.org

The Austin Film Society (AFS) is a non-profit film society based in Austin, Texas. Founded in 1985 to exhibit independent, experimental, foreign and various other non-mainstream art films, the film society has grown from just film exhibition to fostering independent filmmaking in Texas and has served as a cornerstone in building the film industry in Austin.

The film society also owns and maintains Austin Studios, hosts the annual Texas Film Awards gala, and oversees the Austin Film Society grant program. The film society was founded by film director Richard Linklater, who currently serves on the board as artistic director. Other notable members on the board and advisory board include Tim McCanlies, Robert Rodriguez, Charles Burnett, Guillermo del Toro, Jonathan Demme, Mike Judge, John Sayles, Steven Soderbergh, Paul Stekler and Quentin Tarantino.

== History ==
AFS was created in 1985 by film director Richard Linklater, cinematographer Lee Daniel, Austin Chronicle editor and South by Southwest (SXSW) founder Louis Black, University of Texas at Austin film professor Charles Ramirez-Berg and film programmer and professor Chale Nafus. Their original goal was to bring hard-to-find, sometimes obscure films for screening in Austin. Early screenings held in a makeshift projection room upstairs from a local coffee shop drew a moderate cult following. AFS eventually grew in scale and began developing various programs to boost film production and education.

In 2000, with a unique partnership with the City of Austin, AFS created Austin Studios on a section of land from the former Robert Mueller Municipal Airport. Former airplane hangars were converted into five studio production stages while several terminals were turned into production offices. Austin Film Society is currently located on the Austin Studios property, overseeing the daily operations of the studios, in addition to actively bringing in new film productions from small independent films to large studio pictures.

In 2015, AFS expanded its operations by acquiring the city contract for Austin Public, the city's public access television station. This transition marked a significant milestone in AFS's commitment to fostering local media production and independent filmmaking. Under this contract with the City of Austin, AFS took over the management of the public access facility, ensuring continued access to professional-grade equipment, training programs, and community-driven content distribution.

== Leadership ==
- Rebecca Campbell - Chief Executive Officer
- Austin Culp - Director of Marketing
- Jesse Greendyk - Chief Development Officer
- Holly Herrick - Head of Film & Creative Media
- Martin Jones - Studio Director
- Aaron Malzahn - Cinema Director
- Sarah Ann Mockbee - Chief Operating Officer

== Programming ==
Since its inception in 1985, the Austin Film Society has screened more than 2000 films. The 'Essential Cinema' series offers weekly screenings and range in monthly themes from director retrospectives, to regional or genre specific series. 'Doc Nights' is a monthly series which hosts groundbreaking documentaries usually with the filmmakers in attendance.

AFS also has hosted the Quentin Tarantino Film Festival, where Tarantino spent over a week in Austin screening some of his favorite films from his private collection and sharing his unique encyclopedic knowledge of obscure films. The Tarantino Film Festival first began in 1996 as a 10-day event at the Dobie Theatre (at which Tarantino showcased his favorite "sleazy genre films").

AFS has also hosted numerous regional and world premieres of films including: Sin City, Bad News Bears, School of Rock, The Adventures of Shark Boy & Lava Girl, Jackie Brown, and various other films usually directed by Austinite filmmakers like Richard Linklater and Robert Rodriguez.

The film society also hosts smaller screenings of independent films and rough cuts to private audiences at the AFS screening room. New artists services programs like the Docs-In-Progress series allow filmmakers to screen rough cuts to AFS members as a test audience. In 2005, the cast of The Real World Austin screened a rough cut of their SXSW documentary The Real SXSW.

In the spring of 2013, the Austin Film Society partnered with The Marchesa Hall & Theatre to create "AFS at the Marchesa," Austin's new home for classic, independent and art house film programming. The first Austin Film Society screening at AFS at the Marchesa was the 20th anniversary screening of Dazed and Confused. Other screenings and series made possible by the partnership include Richard Linklater's "Jewels in the Wasteland" series, the Old School Kung Fu Weekend, Matewan with John Sayles in attendance, Eggshells with Tobe Hooper in attendance, a Godard vs. Truffaut series, and more.

In May 2016, Austin Film Society took over the lease of the space formerly called The Marchesa Hall & Theatre. The space was then renamed to the AFS Cinema.

== AFS Cinema ==
After a significant renovation, AFS opened the AFS Cinema in spring of 2017 with two screens, a full bar and café, and an event hall available for rentals. AFS curates a wide selection of films for its signature programs at the cinema, including repertory series, new restorations, documentaries, independent films and premieres. Additionally, the AFS Cinema offers a full schedule of first run films, featuring the best in international and independent films new to theaters. Signature film programs are often accompanied by introductions by the film programmers or other special guests.

== Austin Studios ==
Austin Studios is a 20-acre (81,000 m^{2}) film and video production facility with 10,000 square feet (1,000 m^{2}) of production office space and over 100,000 square feet (10,000 m^{2}) of production space. The space includes five production stages converted from airplane hangars, two production office buildings, and numerous onsite vendors including Chapman/Leonard, Film Fleet, Gear, Miscellaneous Rentals, Great FX and Heartland Studio Equipment.

Austin Studios is also home to the Austin Film Society breakroom and screening room with 35 mm, 16 mm and video projection capabilities.

Various studio films shot at Austin Studios include: Miss Congeniality, The New Guy, The Rookie, The Life of David Gale, 25th Hour, Texas Chainsaw Massacre, Secondhand Lions, Spy Kids 3-D: Game Over, Man of the House, Friday Night Lights, The Adventures of Shark Boy and Lava Girl, The Wendell Baker Story, Idiocracy, A Scanner Darkly, Infamous, The Hitcher, The Return, Stop-Loss, and Grindhouse. Various TV shows, commercials and music videos have also been shot at the studios. The Flaming Lips video "Psychic Wall" from The SpongeBob SquarePants Movie was shot in one of the stages and shows a behind the scenes look at the hangars. Austin Studios is also the former home to the Thunderdome, headquarters and skating facility of the Texas Rollergirls, as seen in the A&E reality series Rollergirls.

In November 2006, the city of Austin voted in favor of Proposition 4, which allotted a $5 million bond to improving Austin Studios. Planned renovations include soundproofing the stages, climate control, and improving the digital infrastructure of the facilities.

In 2005, The Austin Film Society recently sponsored the cast of The Real World Austin to produce a documentary on SXSW. In several episodes, AFS facilities and staff can be seen.

== Austin Film Society Grant ==
The Austin Film Society Grant (AFS Grant) is a grant program for emerging Texas-based filmmakers. The program was created in 1996 in response to the lack of public grant funding for filmmakers. As of 2023, the film society has given out over $2,400,000 worth of grants to over 500 filmmakers since its inception, providing the seed money for several projects that went on to screen at festivals like Sundance, Cannes, and SXSW.

The Texas Filmmakers' Production Fund changed its name to the Austin Film Society Grant (AFS Grant) in the spring of 2013.

== Texas Film Awards ==
The Austin Film Society hosts the Texas Film Awards, an annual awards gala inducting legends of cinema and television into the Texas Film Hall of Fame. The Texas Film Awards were founded in 2001 to honor the best in Texas film and to raise funds for the year-round programs and services of AFS. Each year, the event has grown to become the most glamorous night in Austin. Honorees have included Morgan Fairchild, Marcia Gay Harden, Matthew McConaughey, Billy Bob Thornton, Farrah Fawcett, Amber Heard, David Gordon Green, Horton Foote, Terrence Malick, Jack Valenti, Woody Harrelson and music acts such as the Dixie Chicks, ZZ Top and Lyle Lovett. Each year, the Awards also honor a film made in Texas. Past recipients include Dazed And Confused, From Dusk Till Dawn, Rio Bravo, Rushmore, State Fair, Easy Rider, Giant and The Last Picture Show.

== See also ==
- American independent cinema
- Art film
