= Mark Johnson (producer) =

American producer (born 1945)

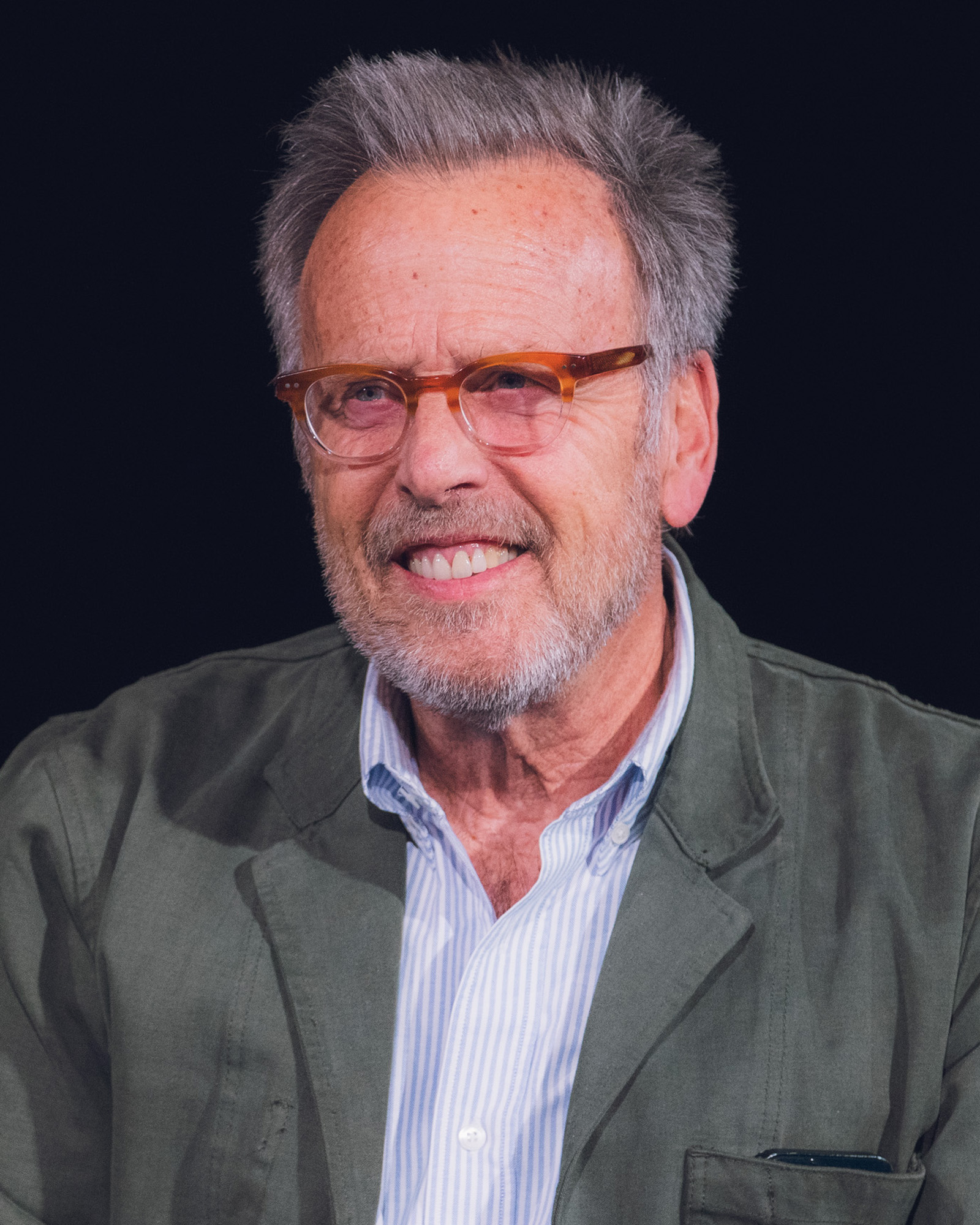
- Johnson in 2026
- Born: December 27, 1945 (age 80); Washington, D.C., U.S.
- Education: University of Virginia; University of Iowa
- Occupations: Film and television producer
- Spouse: Lezlie Brooks (m. 1982)
- Children: 2

Mark Johnson (born December 27, 1945) is an American film and television producer. He won the Academy Award for Best Picture for producing the 1988 film Rain Man.

== Early life ==
Johnson was born in Washington, D.C., the son of Dorothy (née King), a realtor, and Emery Johnson, who worked in the air cargo business. He graduated from the University of Virginia with a Bachelor of Arts in 1971 and received both a Master's Degree and an Honorary Doctorate from the University of Iowa.

== Career ==
Johnson first became involved in show business in 1965, as an actor playing the sheriff's deputy in the Spanish "Spaghetti Western" Brandy, directed by Jose Luis Borau. He spent ten years of his youth in Spain, where he worked as a movie extra in films such as Franklin Schaffner's Nicholas and Alexandra and David Lean's Dr. Zhivago. His early experiences led to small acting roles in the European western Ride and Kill and the 1964 drama The Thin Red Line. After earning a Bachelor's Degree from the University of Virginia, Johnson moved to New York. There he entered the Director's Guild training program. He also received both an MA in Film Scholarship and an Honorary Doctorate from the University of Iowa. One of his first projects was Paul Mazursky's autobiographical drama Next Stop, Greenwich Village. Johnson relocated to Los Angeles and worked as an assistant director on such projects as Movie Movie, The Brink's Job, Escape from Alcatraz and Mel Brooks's High Anxiety, which was co-written by future business partner Barry Levinson.

As part of Baltimore Pictures, his partnership with Levinson, Johnson produced all of the writer-director's films from 1982–1994. In addition to Rain Man, their diverse slate of features includes Good Morning, Vietnam, The Natural, Tin Men, Toys, Young Sherlock Holmes, Avalon, Diner (their 1982 debut project, for which Levinson's screenplay garnered an Oscar nomination) and Bugsy, which was nominated for ten Academy Awards, including Best Picture and Best Director. Bugsy also captured a Best Picture Golden Globe Award.

In 1994, Johnson established his own independent production company, Gran Via Productions, and won the Los Angeles Film Critics New Generation Award for his very first effort; A Little Princess, directed by Alfonso Cuarón. Under his new banner, Johnson produced the comedy Home Fries, written by Vince Gilligan and starring Drew Barrymore, and the dramatic thriller Donnie Brasco, starring Al Pacino and Johnny Depp. Gilligan won a screenwriting competition of which Johnson was a judge, subsequently had two of his screenplays produced by Johnson, Home Fries and Wilder Napalm. Johnson would later serve as a producer for Gilligan's television series Breaking Bad. He also served as executive producer for CBS-TV's L.A. Doctors and Falcone, and for the hit drama The Guardian.

Johnson's recent slate of motion pictures includes The Alamo and The Rookie, both directed by John Lee Hancock; The Banger Sisters, with Susan Sarandon and Goldie Hawn; Brad Silberling's drama Moonlight Mile, with Sarandon and Dustin Hoffman; Tom Shadyac's supernatural thriller Dragonfly, with Kevin Costner and Kathy Bates; Levinson's Irish satire An Everlasting Piece; Robert Zemeckis's spooky thriller What Lies Beneath, starring Harrison Ford and Michelle Pfeiffer; the hit comedy Galaxy Quest, with Tim Allen, Alan Rickman and Sigourney Weaver; and My Dog Skip, the acclaimed family drama (co-produced with John Lee Hancock) starring Frankie Muniz, Diane Lane and Kevin Bacon.

In recent years, Johnson produced Nick Cassavetes's drama The Notebook, The Wendell Baker Story, which marked the directorial debuts of brothers Luke and Andrew Wilson, and How to Eat Fried Worms.

Johnson has either presented or executive produced Luis Llosa's directorial debut, Sniper, Tim Robbins's directorial debut, Bob Roberts, Steven Soderbergh's Kafka, Robert Redford's Oscar-nominated Quiz Show and Journey of Hope, winner of the 1999 Foreign Language Academy Award. Recent projects include The Hunting Party, starring Richard Gere, Lake City, starring Sissy Spacek, Ballast, the critically acclaimed debut of director Lance Hammer, and My Sister's Keeper, starring Cameron Diaz, Alec Baldwin and Abigail Breslin. He is working with Guillermo del Toro to produce the movie adaption of David Moody's novel Hater.

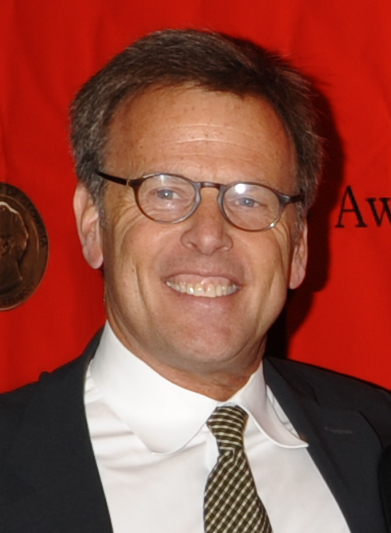
Johnson in 2009

In 2005, Johnson produced The Chronicles of Narnia: The Lion, the Witch and the Wardrobe, directed by Andrew Adamson and starring Tilda Swinton. The film was nominated for three Academy Awards and three BAFTAs, winning one of each. In 2008 he produced a sequel, Prince Caspian. The third film in the Narnia series, The Voyage of the Dawn Treader, directed by Michael Apted, was released December 10, 2010.

Johnson released three feature films in 2012: Not Fade Away, written and directed by The Sopranos creator David Chase and starring James Gandolfini, Chasing Mavericks directed by Curtis Hanson and starring Gerard Butler, and Won't Back Down starring Viola Davis, Maggie Gyllenhaal and Holly Hunter. He produced the 2015 thriller Secret in Their Eyes starring Julia Roberts, Nicole Kidman and Chiwetel Ejiofor.

Johnson was an executive producer on AMC's Emmy Award-winning series Breaking Bad. He was an executive producer on the Sundance Channel original series Rectify, and AMC's Breaking Bad spinoff, Better Call Saul. In 2019 he produced El Camino: A Breaking Bad Movie for Netflix. In 2021, he produced the thriller The Little Things starring Denzel Washington, Rami Malek and Jared Leto, written and directed by John Lee Hancock. In 2021 he executive produced the AMC+ series adaptation of Anne Rice's Interview with the Vampire. In 2023, he executive produced Mayfair Witches, based on another Anne Rice property.

In late 2022 it was announced that Johnson would venture into his first-ever Spanish-language series, a Church scandal drama, "Amen" (a working title).

Produced by Johnson, the 2023 release The Holdovers reunited Paul Giamatti with his Sideways director Alexander Payne. The film enjoyed widespread critical acclaim and garnered Golden Globe wins for Da'Vine Joy Randolph and Paul Giamatti. From seven BAFTA nominations it secured two awards, for Best Supporting Actress and Best Casting Director. It was nominated for five Academy Awards, including Best Picture. Ultimately, it secured the Best Supporting Actress award for Da'Vine Joy Randolph.

Johnson served many years on the Board of Governors of the Academy of Motion Picture Arts and Sciences (Producers Branch). For seventeen years, he headed the Best Foreign Language Film Committee. In 2020, the category was renamed Best International Feature Film.

== Filmography ==
He was a producer in all films unless otherwise noted.

=== Film ===
Producer

- The World of Don Camillo (1983) (co-producer)
- The Natural (1984)
- Young Sherlock Holmes (1985)
- Tin Men (1987)
- Good Morning, Vietnam (1987)
- Rain Man (1988)
- Avalon (1990)
- Bugsy (1991)
- Toys (1992)
- Wilder Napalm (1993)
- A Perfect World (1993)
- Quiz Show (uncredited, 1994)
- Jimmy Hollywood (1994)
- A Little Princess (1995)
- Donnie Brasco (1997)
- Home Fries (1998)
- Galaxy Quest (1999)
- My Dog Skip (2000)
- An Everlasting Piece (2000)
- Dragonfly (2002)
- The Rookie (2002)
- The Banger Sisters (2002)
- Moonlight Mile (2002)
- The Alamo (2004)
- The Notebook (2004)
- The Wendell Baker Story (2005)
- The Chronicles of Narnia: The Lion, the Witch and the Wardrobe (2005)
- How to Eat Fried Worms (2006)
- The Hunting Party (2007)
- The Chronicles of Narnia: Prince Caspian (2008)
- My Sister's Keeper (2009)
- Don't Be Afraid of the Dark (2010)
- The Chronicles of Narnia: The Voyage of the Dawn Treader (2010)
- Bless Me, Ultima (2012)
- Won't Back Down (2012)
- Not Fade Away (2012)
- Chasing Mavericks (2012)
- Secret in Their Eyes (2015)
- Logan Lucky (2017)
- Downsizing (2017)
- Breath (2017)
- The Parts You Lose (2019)
- El Camino: A Breaking Bad Movie (2019)
- The Little Things (2021)
- Fever Dream (2021)
- The Holdovers (2023)

Executive producer

- Diner (1982)
- Kafka (1991)
- Sniper (1993)
- The Astronaut's Wife (1999)
- What Lies Beneath (2000)
- Shooter (2007)
- Ballast (2008)
- Lake City (2008)
- Flying Lessons (2010)
- Aloft (2014)
- Last Weekend (2014)

Assistant director

Year	Film	Role
1977	For the Love of Benji	Second assistant director
1977	Sorcerer	Second assistant director
1977	High Anxiety	Second assistant director
1978	Movie Movie	Second assistant director
1978	The Brink's Job	Second assistant director
1979	Escape from Alcatraz	Second assistant director
1980	Fatso	Assistant director

As an actor

Year	Film	Role	Notes
1963	Brandy	Chico	
1987	Good Morning, Vietnam	Mr. Sloan	Uncredited
2004	The Notebook	Photographer	
2009	My Sister's Keeper	Uncle Pervis	

Miscellaneous crew

Year	Film	Role
1980	Cruising	Production executive
1992	Bob Roberts	Presenter: In association with

Thanks

- Suture (1993)
- Downloading Nancy (2008)
- No Saints for Sinners (2011)
- Santorini Blue (2013)

=== Television ===
Executive producer
Year	Title	Notes
1998−99	L.A. Doctors	
2000	Falcone	
2001	HRT	TV movie
2001−04	The Guardian	
2006	Love Monkey	
2008−13	Breaking Bad	
2014	Wild Blue	TV movie
2015	Battle Creek	
2013−16	Rectify	
2014−17	Halt and Catch Fire	
2015−22	Better Call Saul	
2022−present	Interview with the Vampire	
2023−present	Mayfair Witches	
TBA	Galaxy Quest	

Producer
Year	Title	Credit	Notes
1983	Diner		TV pilot
2016	Shut Eye		

Thanks

- Cyborgs Universe (2020)

== Accolades ==
Accolades received by Mark Johnson
Award organization	Year	Category	Work	Ref.
Academy Awards	1989	Best Picture	Rain Man	
BAFTA TV Awards	2014	Best International Programme	Breaking Bad	
Golden Globe Awards	1989	Best Motion Picture – Drama	Rain Man	
Golden Globe Awards	1992	Best Motion Picture – Drama	Bugsy	
Golden Globe Awards	2014	Best Television Series – Drama	Breaking Bad	
Primetime Emmy Awards	2013	Outstanding Drama Series	Breaking Bad	
Primetime Emmy Awards	2014	Outstanding Drama Series	Breaking Bad	
Producers Guild of America Awards	2014	Outstanding Producer of Episodic Television, Drama	Breaking Bad	
Producers Guild of America Awards	2015	Outstanding Producer of Episodic Television, Drama	Breaking Bad	
