= Made in Texas =

In October 1981, director Jonathan Demme presented the Made in Texas - New Films From Austin series at the Collective for Living Cinema in New York City. Demme, along with Austin Film Society co-founder, South by South West co-founder, and Austin Chronicle co-founder Louis Black, assembled six 16mm and 8mm short films made in and around Austin, Texas, in 1980 to present as a representation of the kinds of films being made and produced in Austin at that time. The six films were Invasion of the Aluminum People by David Boone, Speed of Light, by Brian Hansen, Fair Sisters by Louis Black, Missy Boswell, and Ed Lowry, Leonardo, Jr by Lorrie Oshatz, The Death of Jim Morrison by Tom Huckabee, and Mask of Sarnath by Neil Ruttenberg.

In 1980, then film student, Louis Black, wrote to Jonathan Demme in support of his early films, including Caged Heat and Crazy Mama. Demme, flattered by Black's favor and earnestness, visited Austin as a guest of Black. The story goes that the two men ate lots of barbeque, listened to lots of local punk and new wave music, and eventually watched lots of local shorts. Demme was blown away at the creativity and rawness of the Austin shorts and the very next day decided to show them as a series at The Collective for Living Cinema.

Speed of Light and Invasion of the Aluminum People have been shown together since at Austin Film Festival and other large and small scale screenings. The six short films are currently being restored, digitized, and preserved for future filmmakers and film consumers and will be available as an archival package for film festivals and cinemas to screen for the public.
