= Home Fries =

- Theatrical release poster
- Directed by: Dean Parisot
- Written by: Vince Gilligan
- Produced by: Mark Johnson; Lawrence Kasdan; Barry Levinson; Charles Newirth
- Starring: Drew Barrymore; Catherine O'Hara; Luke Wilson; Jake Busey; Shelley Duvall
- Cinematography: Jerzy Zieliński
- Edited by: Nicholas C. Smith
- Music by: Rachel Portman
- Distributed by: Warner Bros.
- Release date: November 25, 1998
- Running time: 91 minutes
- Country: United States
- Language: English
- Budget: $15 million
- Box office: $10.4 million (US)

Home Fries is a 1998 American Southern Gothic black comedy-romance film directed by Dean Parisot, and starring Drew Barrymore and Luke Wilson. The script was originally penned by writer Vince Gilligan for a film class at New York University.

The film follows a U.S. Army National Guard Cobra helicopter pilot (Wilson) in rural Texas who falls for a pregnant fast-food restaurant worker (Barrymore) and accidentally kills his stepdad with his brother (Jake Busey) after their mother (Catherine O'Hara) discovers his affair with the fast-food employee.

== Plot ==
In Graham County, Texas, Henry Lever orders a milkshake at the Burger-Matic drive-thru. At the window, he tells the attendant Sally Jackson that his wife Beatrice knows about their affair. She asks him if he has also told Beatrice about her pregnancy. On his way home, Henry encounters a ferocious wind. It turns out to be a Cobra attack helicopter, which runs him off the road. In a panic, he flees through the woods and drops his heart medication. At an outdoor chapel, he sits on a bench as the helicopter hovers in front of him. The pilot, Angus Montier, shoots at the ground near him despite the protests of his copilot and brother Dorian. The shots scare Henry enough to cause a fatal heart attack.

Throughout the attack, Dorian and Angus hear the chatter of Sally and her coworkers. Likewise, they hear the helicopter pilots on headsets. The next day, the police inform Beatrice that Henry has died and she appears shocked and crestfallen. When Dorian and Angus arrive, it quickly becomes clear that she encouraged her sons to scare him to death. She is also furious about his affair and wants revenge on Sally. Angus and Dorian are worried that the people they heard on the radio might have overheard enough to connect them to his death. They quickly deduce that Burger-Matic is the only location close enough to have been on the same frequency. Angus goads Dorian into getting a job there to ensure that no one is wise to their crime.

Sally is heartbroken at the news about Henry. At work, Dorian bonds with her quickly. He gives her a model helicopter for her baby and he explains that he and Angus fly them as reservists for the National Guard. She asks him to accompany her to lamaze class since she doesn't have a partner. Eventually, he takes her to the base to see the helicopter that he flies. As she sits in the cockpit, she tells him about Henry.

Knowing that Beatrice is still furious about Henry's affair and that Angus would hurt Sally if he knew her identity, Dorian frantically tries to keep the truth from his family. When Angus discovers Sally's identity, Beatrice visits her under the pretense of making amends. Dorian is terrified of what Angus might do out of a misplaced loyalty to their crazy mother. Sure enough, he arrives at Sally's house in the attack helicopter. She, Dorian and Beatrice escape in a truck. He eventually forces them to stop on the road. Beatrice pretends to be unaware of what is going on and leaves the truck. Dorian gradually convinces Angus to stop his attack.

The stress of the chase triggers Sally's labor and Dorian drives her to the hospital. After she has a boy, he talks to him. He struggles to explain how they are related and he tells him that he is lucky to have the best mother in the world.

== Cast ==
- Drew Barrymore as Sally Jackson
- Catherine O'Hara as Beatrice Lever
- Luke Wilson as Dorian Montier
- Jake Busey as Angus Montier
- Shelley Duvall as Mrs. Jackson
- Kim Robillard as Billy
- Daryl Mitchell as Roy
- Lanny Flaherty as Red Jackson
- Chris Ellis as Henry Lever
- Blue Deckert as Sheriff
- Mark Walters as Deputy
- Shane Steiner as Soldier in Jeep
- Theresa Merritt as Mrs. Vaughan
- Jill Parker-Jones as Lamaze Instructor
- Morgana Shaw as Lucy Garland

== Production ==
Home Fries was written in 1988 by Virginia-born screenwriter Vince Gilligan, with the original setting of the film taking place in rural Cumberland County, Virginia, where Gilligan was raised in the county's largest town, Farmville. In 1990, Home Fries won the Governor's Screenwriting Competition at the Virginia Festival of American Film, which was overseen by film producer Mark Johnson. Johnson initially produced a later screenplay of Gilligan's, Wilder Napalm in 1993, before producing Home Fries.

Filming took place on location in the Texas cities of Bastrop and Coupland in the counties of Bastrop and Williamson County in January 1997.

== Critical reception ==
The film received mixed reviews from critics. It currently holds a 31% rating on Rotten Tomatoes, based on 36 reviews. The website's critics consensus reads, "Screenwriter Vince Gilligan's mordant sense of humor strikes a discordant note in Home Fries, a romantic caper full of empty calories." Metacritic, which uses a weighted average, assigned the film a score of 45 out of 100, based on 17 critics, indicating "mixed or average" reviews.

Roger Ebert gave the film a mixed review, writing, "Home Fries is not a great movie, and as much as I finally enjoyed it, I'm not sure it's worth seeing two times just to get into the rhythm. More character and less plot might have been a good idea. But the actors are tickled by their characters and have fun with them, and so I did, too."
