= Laura Wilson (photographer) =

American photographer (born 1939)

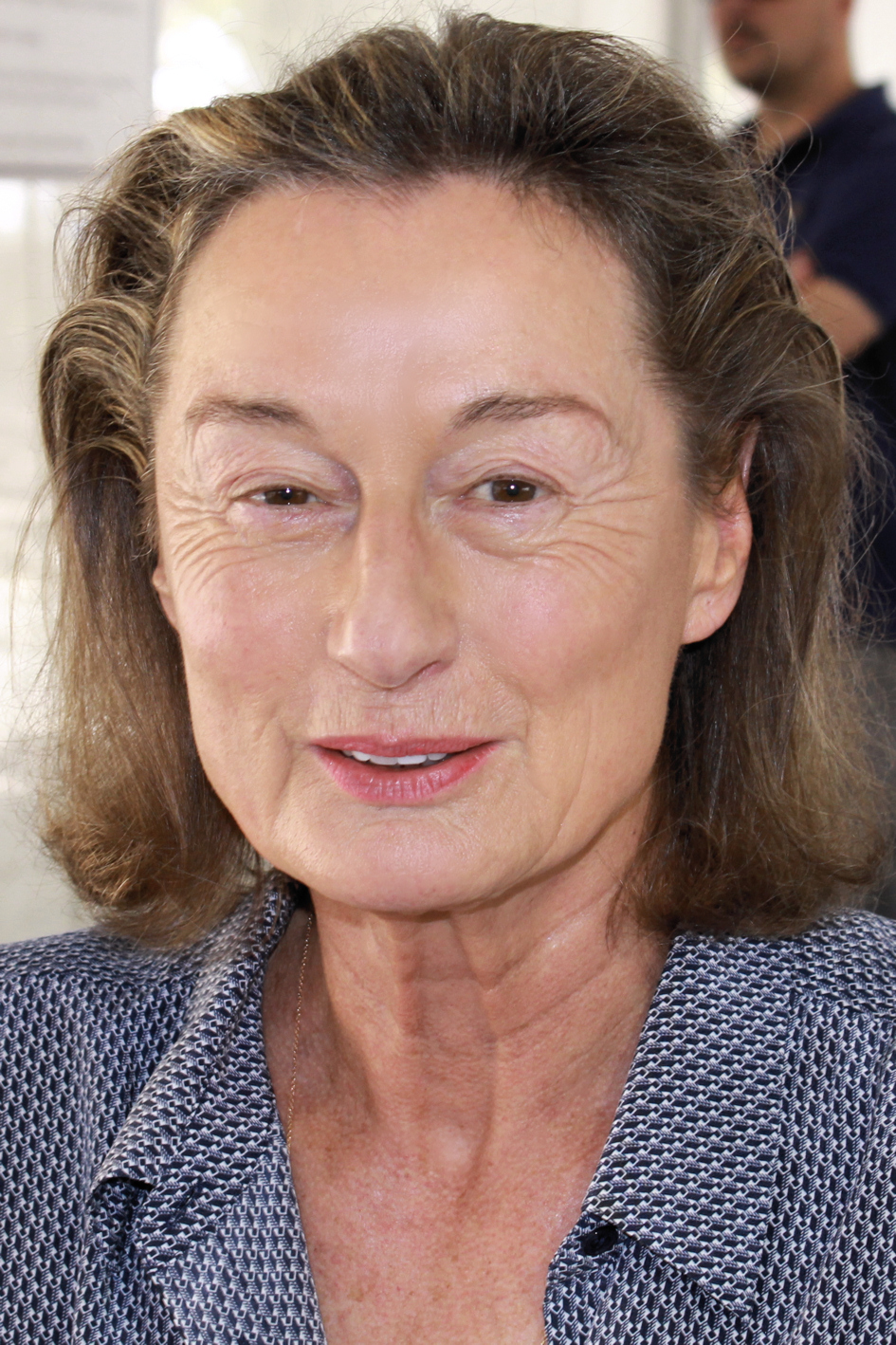
- Wilson at the 2015 Texas Book Festival
- Born: Laura Cunningham; October 13, 1939 (age 86); Norwell, Massachusetts, U.S.
- Education: Connecticut College (BA)
- Occupation: Photographer
- Spouses: Robert Wilson (m. 1963; died 2017); Scot Dykema (m. 2020)
- Children: Andrew; Owen; Luke
- Writing career
- Years active: 1980–present
- Website: laurawilsonphotography.com

Laura Cunningham Wilson (née Cunningham; born October 13, 1939) is an American photographer. She has completed nine books of photography and text: Watt Matthews of Lambshead (1989), Hutterites of Montana (2000), Avedon at Work: In the American West (2003), Grit and Glory: Six-Man Football (2003), That Day: Pictures in the American West (2015), From Rodin to Plensa: Modern Sculpture at the Meadows Museum (2018), The Writers: Portraits by Laura Wilson (2022), AllianceTexas: 35 Years of Commerce and Community (2024), and Roaming Mexico (2025). She is the mother of actors Andrew Wilson, Owen Wilson, and Luke Wilson.

== Life and career ==
Laura Cunningham was born and raised in Norwell, Massachusetts, a suburb of Boston. She had one older sister named Sheila. Their parents were Rosemary Cunningham (née White) and Edward James Cunningham. She majored in art at Connecticut College for Women, graduating in 1961.

Wilson was drawn to photography as a young girl when she became interested in family photographs. Some of her earliest photographs are of her three young sons: "I had majored in painting in college. But with three active little boys, I didn't have time to paint. My uncle, Jack Cunningham, gave me a camera. I realized at once that the boys were perfect subjects." Wilson's son Owen credits his and his brothers' comfort in front of a camera to being frequently photographed by their mother.

Wilson's professional career was launched in 1979 when Richard Avedon hired her to assist with his exhibition and book In the American West, which was commissioned by the Amon Carter Museum. Wilson traveled with Avedon for six years, helping him find subjects to photograph. She also wrote the text for In the American West. Wilson's work with Avedon helped her become deeply familiar with the West and provided inspiration for her later projects. Her photographs acknowledge the spectrum of cultures that occupy the West.

From growing up in the New England countryside, Wilson arrived at her interest in photographing people outside of mainstream America. "I became interested in men and women who are trying to live an idealized life against the odds." In a 2018 interview she described her artistic attraction to isolated groups of people, saying, "I am drawn to people who live in an enclosed world—those people who live in isolated communities, whether by circumstance or accomplishment; I was curious about these groups and wanted to know more... my wish, as Eudora Welty wrote, 'would be not to point the finger in judgment but to part a curtain, that invisible shadow that falls between people.'"

Wilson frequently refers to photography's ability to mitigate loss and stem the flow of time.

Wilson has lectured on photography at Harvard University, the International Center of Photography in New York City, the San Francisco Museum of Modern Art and the University of Texas at Austin.

She is a member of the Texas Institute of Letters and the Philosophical Society of Texas. She serves on the advisory boards of the Harry Ransom Center at the University of Texas at Austin; and the Meadows Museum at Southern Methodist University. In 2019, she was inducted into the National Cowgirl Museum and Hall of Fame.

== Books ==
Wilson has completed nine books of photography and text:

Watt Matthews of Lambshead (1989) is a photographic essay about one of the last Texas cattlemen. Matthews lived his entire life on the famous Lambshead Ranch, located west of Fort Worth. A. C. Greene wrote that “[Watt] Matthews … was the last living link with all the Texas cowboy and ranch mythology and lore from the 1850s.” Matthews' obituary, The New York Times wrote that the book has become "a classic of Texas history."

Hutterites of Montana (2000) documents the Hutterite communities of the American West. Wilson's interest in the Hutterites began during her work with Avedon: "Still vivid in my mind is my first glimpse of the Hutterites. We were driving in Montana at dusk. There was a lovely pink sunset. We saw in the distance an open meadow of wheat, and far off, figures walking. The girls were in long, colorful dresses, like Christian LaCroix, the boys in white shirts and black pants." Hutterite communities generally do not allow photography, but Wilson visited Montana Hutterite communities many times and eventually received permission to take photos.

Avedon at Work: In the American West (2003) is a portrait of photographer Richard Avedon that shows Avedon's creative process, working methods, and range of subjects as he worked to complete In the American West. Wilson documented Avedon's process throughout the six years they spent working on the project, and the book describes this work.

Grit and Glory: Six-Man Football (2003) documents six-man football and its culture in small Texas towns. “In this jewel of a book, Laura Wilson reveals the energy and thrill of the six-man game and the visceral, rough-edged culture in which it is played and cherished.”

That Day: Pictures in the American West (2015) includes photographs in the American West accompanied by Wilson's observations from the time each photograph was taken. Larry McMurtry wrote, "Laura Wilson has an ever-searching eye for the bleak beauty of the West — and for its bleak reality too. That Day is a remarkable book." Andrew R. Graybill, Director of the William P. Clements Center for Southwest Studies, noted that the book "combines her talents for capturing the West's enduring and romantic myths, from legendary cattle ranches to dramatic panoramic vistas, as well as its bleak realities, whether undocumented migrants crossing the Rio Grande or life on the Pine Ridge Indian Reservation."

Rodin to Plensa: Modern Sculpture at the Meadows Museum (2018) includes works by many of the leading twentieth-century Modernists in the sculpture collection of the Meadows Museum in Dallas, Texas. Large- and small-scale works by Jacques Lipchitz, Henry Moore, Isamu Noguchi and Claes Oldenburg can be seen on the Museum's welcoming outdoor plaza, while important figural sculptures by Auguste Rodin, Aristide Maillol and Alberto Giacometti are on display within the Museum. This is the first publication on this collection, offering photography by Laura Wilson and new scholarship by Steven A. Nash on works by some of the most accomplished artists to work in three dimensions.

The Writers: Portraits by Laura Wilson (2022) inspired by the classic photo essays that once appeared in Life magazine, Laura Wilson presents portraits of thirty-eight internationally acclaimed writers. Through her photos and accompanying texts, she gives us glimpses into the everyday lives of such figures as Rachel Cusk, Edwidge Danticat, David McCullough, Haruki Murakami, and the late Carlos Fuentes and Seamus Heaney, among others. Margaret Atwood works in her garden. Tim O’Brien performs magic tricks for his family. And Louise Erdrich, who contributes an introduction, speaks with customers in her Minneapolis bookstore. The book reflects on writing and photography’s shared concerns with invention, transformation, memory, and preservation. The collection consists of 220 duotone images.

AllianceTexas: 35 Years of Commerce and Community, Photographs by Laura Wilson (2024)

Roaming Mexico (2025) explores the people and places of Mexico and was published to accompany a major exhibition of over 70 photographs at the Meadows Museum. The book focuses on life in the towns of Mexico and the Texas border and includes scenes from popular festivals, quinceañeras, cowboys, firebreathers, and portraits of residents. It features work drawn from Wilson's thirty years of exploration in the area, including new and unpublished images.

== Personal life ==
Wilson married TV station executive Robert Wilson in 1963, and the couple moved to Dallas, Texas, in 1965. Together they had three sons, actors Andrew, Owen, and Luke, and grandparents of five grandchildren. Robert died of Alzheimer's disease on May 5, 2017. She married Scot Dykema in 2020.

== Publications ==
- Watt Matthews of Lambshead. Texas State Historical Association, 1989. ISBN 0876110901.
- Hutterites of Montana. Yale University Press, 2000. ISBN 0300083394.
- Avedon at Work: In the American West. University of Texas Press, 2003. ISBN 0292701934.
- Grit and Glory: Six-Man Football. Bright Sky Press, 2003. ISBN 1931721289.
- Our Architecture: Arts & Humanities DFW/2012. Dallas, Tex.: Dallas Architecture Forum, 2012
- That Day: Pictures in the American West. Yale University Press, 2015. ISBN 9780300215397.
- From Rodin to Plensa: Modern Sculpture at the Meadows Museum. Scala Arts Publishers Inc, 2018. ISBN 178551105X.
- The Writers: Portraits by Laura Wilson. Yale University Press, 2022. ISBN 0300257783.
- AllianceTexas: 35 Years of Commerce and Community, Photographs by Laura Wilson, 2024.
- Roaming Mexico. Scala Arts Publishers Inc, 2025. ISBN 978-1-78551-603-0.

== Exhibitions ==
- Watt Matthews of Lambshead, Irving Arts Center, 1994
- Photographs from Avedon at Work, Amon Carter Museum of American Art, Fort Worth, Texas, September 2005
- Photographs from Grit & Glory, Meadows Museum at Southern Methodist University, January 30, 2011 – April 23, 2011
- That Day: Laura Wilson, Amon Carter Museum of American Art, September 2015 – February 2016
- That Day: Laura Wilson, Booth Western Art Museum, January 2018 – April 2018
- Laura Wilson: Looking West, National Cowgirl Museum and Hall of Fame, October 3, 2019 – March 15, 2020
- The Writers: Portraits by Laura Wilson, Harry Ransom Center at The University of Texas at Austin, August 27 – December 30, 2022
- The Writers: Portraits by Laura Wilson, Lake Forest College, October 5 – November 5, 2023
- Roaming Mexico, Meadows Museum at Southern Methodist University, September 14, 2025 – January 11, 2026
- The Writers: Portraits by Laura Wilson, Fondren Library, Southern Methodist University, November 2025 - November 2027
