= Preston Tylk =

- Directed by: Jon Bokenkamp
- Written by: Jon Bokenkamp
- Produced by: James Frey; Dan Glasser; Roni Eguia
- Starring: Luke Wilson; Norman Reedus; Dennis Farina; Mili Avital
- Cinematography: Joey Forsyte
- Edited by: Ann Truelove
- Music by: Kurt Kuenne
- Release date: June 6, 2000 (Seattle)
- Running time: 93 minutes
- Country: United States
- Language: English

Preston Tylk (also titled Bad Seed) is a 2000 American mystery thriller film written and directed by Jon Bokenkamp and starring Luke Wilson, Norman Reedus, Dennis Farina and Mili Avital.

== Plot ==
Preston Tylk and his wife, Emily, are having an argument when she confesses to having an affair. Preston storms out of their house to a local diner; upon returning he sees an orange car driving away and finds Emily dead. A few days later, Preston tracks down the man Emily was having an affair with, Jonathan Casey, and breaks into his house. A man finds him there, and the two get into an altercation, resulting in the man's death. Preston drives the body out of town and buries it, returning home to clean up.

The next morning, Casey enters Preston's home and holds him at gunpoint, revealing that it was his mentally disabled brother, Art, whom Preston had killed, and that the murder was caught on a surveillance camera in the house. When a neighbor stops by and inadvertently distracts Casey, Preston slips out to his car and escapes. While at the local diner, he overhears a police radio detailing his physical appearance as he is now wanted on suspicion of murder.

Casey follows him from the diner and attempts to shoot Preston; a chase through a restaurant and nearby apartment building commences. After escaping Preston goes to a local P.I., Dick Muller, who tells Preston to go to a motel and wait for him there. The bookend that Preston used to kill Casey's brother mysteriously appears on the bedside table, and Preston destroys it. The next morning, Casey calls the motel room, and Muller tracks his number to Casey's bakery. They break in to try to find the tape, but Casey is there and a fight occurs. Muller is stabbed in the hand, while Preston is shot in the arm. The police arrive and all three men leave.

Preston and Muller go to an old client of Muller's, Dillon, to receive medical aid, but the police track them there and they are forced again to flee. At a motel room out of town, Preston watches a tape he took from Casey, which shows his wife discussing the disintegration of their marriage and having sex with Casey. Preston destroys the television set, steals Muller's gun and locks himself in the bathroom. Muller comforts him and describes the failure of his own marriage and his estrangement from his daughter.

Casey calls them, and Muller tracks his number to the next room. Preston spots Casey outside and gives chase, they capture him and retrieve the murder tape. While driving back to Tacoma, Casey causes a struggle and they get into an accident. When Preston awakens, he discovers that Casey has taken Muller hostage and left a note to meet that night. Preston goes to Casey's house and hears a phone message that implicates Art in Emily's death.

At their arranged meeting, Casey knocks Preston unconscious and drives him into the woods, where he plans to immolate him. Preston confronts Casey with Art's role in Emily's murder, and realizes that Casey thinks that Preston killed her and wants revenge. Preston manages to attack and escape Casey, but the pair end up hanging over the side of a cliff. Preston pulls himself up and starts to leave, but goes back and helps Casey up. Casey sets Muller free from the trunk and drives away.

Preston turns himself in to the police for Art's murder. He tells the police where to find Art's body and is sent to prison. Muller visits Preston in prison, where Preston tells him that he has bought him an airplane ticket to London, to attend his daughter's wedding. Casey goes to Art's graveside and talks about his loneliness following Art and Emily's deaths, and his inability to see a future for himself. When the police catch up to him at a gas station, he douses himself in gasoline and self-immolates. Preston stands in the prison yard, letting the rain wash over him.

== Cast ==
- Luke Wilson as Preston Tylk
- Norman Reedus as Jonathan Casey
- Dennis Farina as Dick Muller
- Mili Avital as Emily Tylk
- Vincent Kartheiser as Dillon
- T.J. Thyne as Art Casey
- Larry Boothby as Truck Driver
- Andrew Wilson as Police Officer

== Release ==
The film was shown at the Seattle International Film Festival on June 6, 2000.

== Reception ==
The film has a 20% rating on Rotten Tomatoes based on five reviews.

Ken Eisner of Variety gave the film a mixed review and wrote that it "is lacking a certain oomph in both action and character payoffs, though, and may have a hard time edging more polished fare off crowded screens."

TV Guide gave the film a negative review: "This drably photographed psychological thriller seems to confuse coincidence with fatalism, and guilty consciences prevail as these two lost souls embrace their comeuppance."
