= Druid Peak (film) =

- Promotional poster
- Directed by: Marni Zelnick
- Written by: Marni Zelnick
- Produced by: Julie Buck; Dana Morgan; Jeff Petriello
- Starring: Spencer Treat Clark; Andrew Wilson; Rachel Korine
- Cinematography: Rachel Morrison
- Music by: Timo Elliston
- Production company: Rabbit Bandini Productions
- Release dates: 28 March 2014 (Annapolis Film Festival); 9 January 2015 (Los Angeles)
- Running time: 111 minutes
- Country: United States
- Language: English

Druid Peak is a 2014 American coming-of-age drama film written and directed by Marni Zelnick, starring Spencer Treat Clark, Andrew Wilson and Rachel Korine.

== Cast ==
- Spencer Treat Clark as Owen
- Andrew Wilson as Everett
- Rachel Korine as Zoe
- Damian Young as McGill
- Lanna Joffrey as Jillian
- Armand Schultz as Dale
- Rebecca L. Baldwin as Elaine
- Nathaniel Brown as Matt

== Reception ==
Brendan O'Connor of the Orlando Weekly rated the film 4 stars out of 5 wrote: "Half the film is palpably angsty-broody, so it’s a relief when you find yourself grinning along with the boys as they fall in love with the scenery, each other and the creatures they study."

Pam Powell of the Daily Journal rated the film 3 stars out of 5 and wrote that the film is "simply beautiful on all levels: it's a compelling and realistic story which is enhanced by stellar cinematography. On the surface, it's a story about a troubled teen, but there are so many layers that it becomes much more than that. It is a story about life."

Andrea Beach of Common Sense Media rated the film 3 stars out of 5 and wrote that the film features a "relatable" story, "solid but not stellar" acting and "gorgeous" landscapes. However, she wrote that the film "loses momentum and can start to feel aimless during some of the long, quiet stretches that mainly bask in the scenery."

Michael Rechtshaffen of the Los Angeles Times wrote: "While undeniably gorgeous, at some point all those sweeping vistas can’t help but feel like a pitch for Wyoming tourism."
