= Austin Studios =

Film and video production location in Austin, Texas

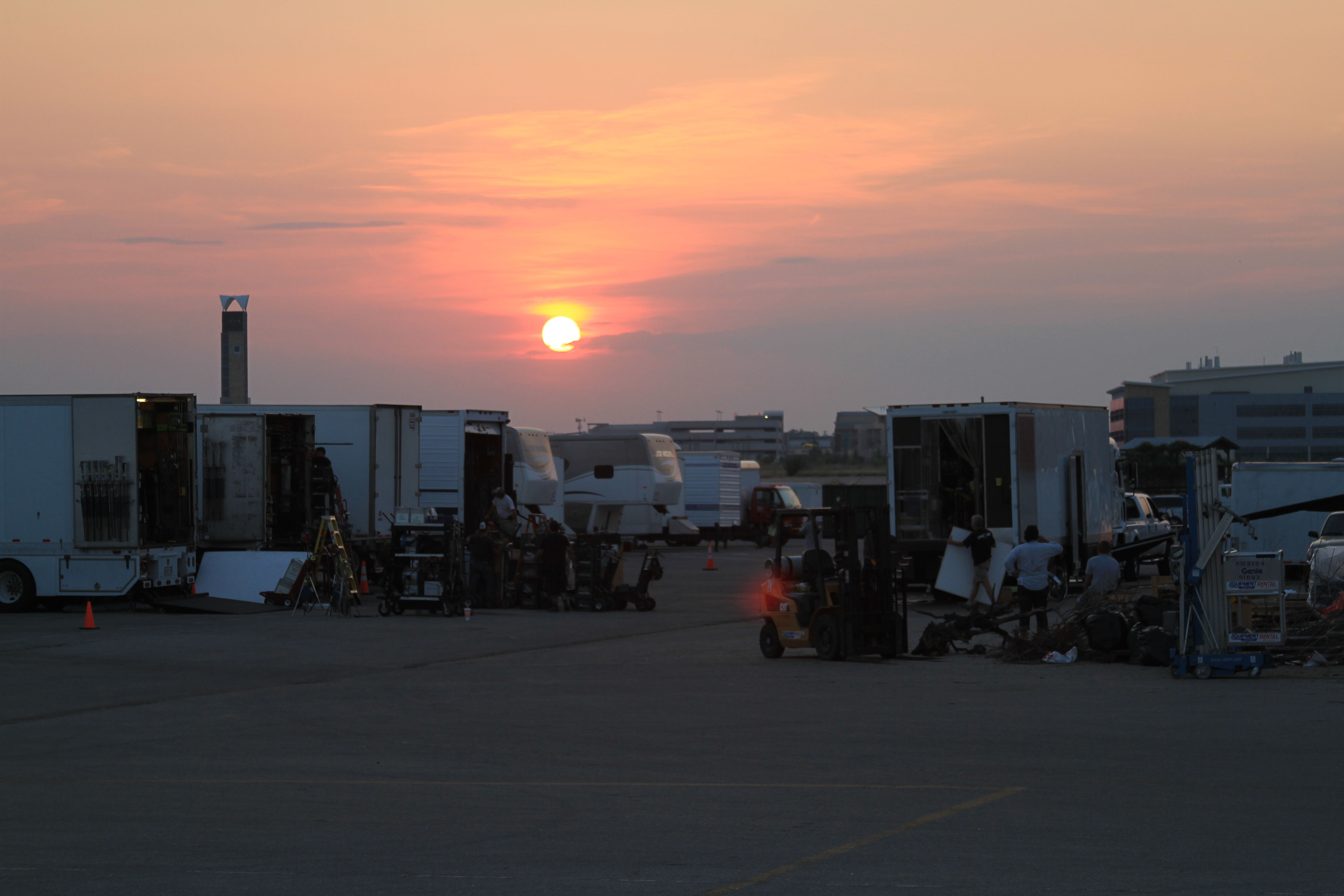
Austin Studios Backlot

Austin Studios is a 20-acre (81,000 m²) film and video production facility established in 2000. The facility holds over 35,000 square feet (10,668 m²) of production office space and over 126,000 square feet (38,405 m²) of production space. These spaces include two soundstages, five flex stages (filming, mill, office, wardrobe, etc.), a jail set, a country-western bar set, and production office spaces. There are also numerous on-site vendors, including MPS Studios and Miscellaneous Rentals.

Austin Studios is home to the Austin Film Society main office.

== History ==
Austin Studios, operated by the Austin Film Society in partnership with the City of Austin, is a hub for the region’s creative media ecosystem. Located at the former Robert Mueller Municipal Airport, this 20-acre film and creative media production complex is conveniently located in central Austin. When the airport was decommissioned in 1999 and moved to Austin-Bergstrom International Airport, the Austin Film Society, under the leadership of founder and artistic director Richard Linklater entered into a unique partnership with the City of Austin to convert former airplane hangars into production stages, as well as a private terminal that was turned into a production office. The Studios were officially opened in October 2000.

Austin Studios’ production facilities currently feature two sound stages, a mill/wardrobe facility, two vendor warehouses, two flex stages, production offices, and a dedicated parking area for base camp. In addition to the 200,000 sq. ft. of production space, Austin Studios is home to filmmakers, production vendors, and small businesses, including Richard Linklater’s Detour Filmproduction, Miscellaneous Rentals, MPS Camera & Lighting Austin, Beth Sepko Casting, Vicky Boone Casting, and more.

For 10 years, Austin Studios was also the official home of Rooster Teeth, as well as the mid-country hub for motion picture equipment rental company Chapman/Leonard Studio Equipment.

Austin Studios has been the recipient of two city bonds. In 2006, Proposition 4: Cultural Facilities was voted on, which allotted $5 million towards improving the Studios, soundproofing the stages, and improving the digital infrastructure of the facilities. In addition, Austin Studios received $1 million from Austin Energy towards climate control in soundstages Stages 3 & 5. In 2012, Proposition 18: Cultural Arts Facility Improvements allotted $5.4 million towards renovating a decommissioned Texas National Guard Armory Building into the Creative Media Center among other improvement projects.

During its 26-year history, Austin Studios has become the hub of the Texas film ecosystem; posting over 1200 productions, resulting in over 50,000 jobs, and to date an economic impact of $3 Billion on the Austin economy.

== Productions ==
=== Films ===
- Miss Congeniality (2000)
- Spy Kids (2001)
- The New Guy (2002)
- Spy Kids 2: The Island of Lost Dreams (2002)
- The Rookie (2002)
- 25th Hour (2002)
- Secondhand Lions (2003)
- Spy Kids 3D: Game Over (2003)
- The Life of David Gale (2003)
- The Texas Chainsaw Massacre (2003)
- The Adventures of Sharkboy and Lavagirl (2005)
- Man of the House (2005)
- The Wendell Baker Story (2005)
- A Scanner Darkly (2006)
- Fast Food Nation (2006)
- How To Eat Fried Worms (2006)
- Idiocracy (2006)
- Infamous (2006)
- The Return (2006)
- The Texas Chainsaw Massacre: The Beginning (2006)
- Grindhouse (2007)
- The Hitcher (2007)
- Stop-Loss (2008)
- Friday the 13th (2009)
- Machete (2010)
- Predators (2010)
- Temple Grandin (2010)
- True Grit (2010)
- Spy Kids: All the Time in the World (2011)
- Machete Kills (2013)
- Parkland (2013)
- Boyhood (2014)
- Manglehorn (2014)
- Lazer Team (2015)
- Lazer Team 2 (2017)
- Blood Fest (2018)
- Thunder Road (2018)
- Little Woods (2018)
- Alita: Battle Angel (2019)
- We Can Be Heroes (2020)
- Spy Kids: Armageddon (2023)
- Family Movie (2027)

=== Television Series ===
- Friday Night Lights (2006-2011)
- Rollergirls (2006)
- The Lying Game (2011-2013)
- From Dusk Till Dawn: The Series (2014-2016)
- Panic (2021)
- Walker (2021-2024)
- Bad Thoughts (2025)

=== Music Videos ===
- “Psychic Wall of Energy” (from The SpongeBob SquarePants Movie) - The Flaming Lips
