= Julie Buck =

American film producer

Julie Anne Buck
- Born: December 9, 1974 (age 51); Walnut Creek, California
- Education: Columbia University
- Known for: film production, collage, photography
- Website: juliebuck.com

Julie Anne Buck (born December 9, 1974) is an American film producer, collage artist, photographer, experimental filmmaker, and film archivist.

== Life ==
Buck studied at the George Eastman House in Rochester, New York. After graduating, she became the manager for the Harvard Film Archive at Harvard University. While sorting and preserving films in the Archive's collection, she and her friend and co-archivist Karin Segal became interested in the images of women (known as "China girls") which often appear on the leaders of older films. Buck and Segal began the long process of digitally cleaning, restoring and printing these enigmatic images for an art exhibit titled "Girls On Film," a visual tribute to the many anonymous women who worked in the film industry.

At the same time, Buck began to experiment with collage. Her first large-format collage, Black-Haired Girl: Karin, depicted Segal, with a challenging stare, raising a glass of orange juice at the viewer. Buck has created three collage series to date—"Black-Haired Girls," "Heads" and "Blank Slate"—and has also completed two commissioned works. In college, Buck received a 1950 Rolleiflex camera that had been owned by her great-grandfather and began using it to take pictures. "Self-Centered," a series of black-and-white photographs of herself wearing various articles of clothing in deliberately staged surroundings, was the result.

Buck later decided to pursue her interests in narrative filmmaking. She graduated from Columbia University's film school in 2011 with an emphasis in film production.

== Works ==
=== Film production ===
Full-length films (producer)

- Devoured (2012)
- Child of God (2013)
- Field of Lost Shoes (2014)
- Druid Peak (2014)
- Anesthesia (2014)
- Black Dog, Red Dog (2017)
- Trouble (2017)
- The Life and Deaths of Wilson Shedd (TBA)

Short films (producer)

- Ben (2009, directed by Eliza Subotowicz)
- This Little Light (2009, directed by Catherine Shao)
- Loop Planes (2010, directed by Robin Wilby)
- Terrebonne (2010, directed by Jeremy Craig)
- Salar (2011, directed by Nicholas Greene)
- Alger, Alger (2011, directed by Aaron Walker)
- Silent Night (2011, directed by Bryan Parker)
- Temma (2012, directed by Anya Meksin)
- Periods. (2012, directed by Victor Quinaz)

=== Other creative work ===
Buck's collage work tends to traverse the fine line between purely visually representative art and abstract depictions of the personality traits of her subjects. Her black-and-white photograph series, "Self-Centered," is reminiscent of the work of Cindy Sherman, reflecting both Buck's sense of humor and her keen interest in classic film. The black-and-white and color prints of the "Girls On Film" series are both familiar and enigmatic; they are based on the anonymous China Girls that used to appear in the leaders of film reels.

Buck's work has been exhibited in galleries in Columbus, Ohio; Boston; Cambridge and New York City.

Collage series

- Black-Haired Girls, 1998-2005.
- Heads, 2004
- Blank Slate, 2005.

Photograph series

- Self-Centered, 1999.
- Girls on Film (with Karin Segal), 2005.

Books

- Girls on Film, 2009 (forthcoming).
- Finite Sets, Preacher's Biscuit Books, June 2009. ISBN 0-9767490-8-4
