= Andrew Wilson (actor) =

American actor (born 1964)

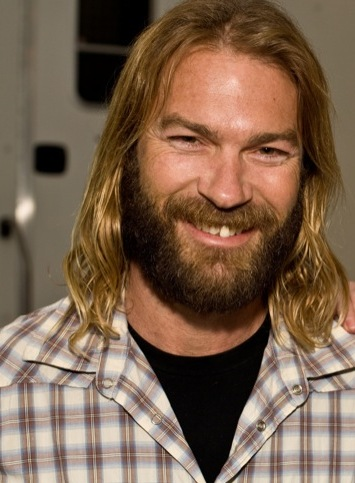
- Wilson at the Texas Film Hall of Fame Awards 2009
- Born: Andrew Cunningham Wilson; August 22, 1964 (age 62); Dallas, Texas, U.S.
- Occupation: Actor
- Years active: 1993–present
- Children: 1
- Parent(s): Laura Wilson; Robert Wilson
- Relatives: Owen Wilson (brother); Luke Wilson (brother)

Andrew Cunningham Wilson (born August 22, 1964) is an American actor and director. He is the older brother of actors Owen Wilson and Luke Wilson.

== Early life ==
Wilson is the eldest of three sons of photographer Laura Cunningham Wilson (born 1939) and Robert Andrew Wilson (1941–2017), an advertising executive and operator of a public television station. His younger brothers Owen and Luke are also actors who all attended St. Mark's School of Texas together. Wilson is of Irish descent.

== Career ==
Wilson has worked in the entertainment industry since the early 1990s, appearing in more than two dozen films. He has acted in three Wes Anderson films — with a supporting role in Bottle Rocket (1996)—and other notable credits include Rushmore (1998), The Royal Tenenbaums (2001), The Big Bounce (2004), Fever Pitch (2005), Idiocracy (2006), Church Ball (2006), Whip It! (2009), Druid Peak (2014), Hall Pass (2011), and Time Trap (2017). He also appeared in The Big Year (2011) alongside his brother, Owen Wilson.

Wilson has often collaborated with his brothers, both as an actor and as a director. In 2005, he and brother Luke directed The Wendell Baker Story, which starred Luke (in the title role) and brother Owen.

== Personal life ==
Wilson has one son (born 2003) with former partner Nnogo Obiamiwe.

== Filmography ==
| Year | Title | Role | Notes |
|---|---|---|---|
| 1993 | Das letzte U-Boot | Grant | TV movie |
| 1995 | House of Pain | Unknown | |
| 1996 | Bottle Rocket | Jon Mapplethorpe / Future Man | Also Associate Producer |
| 1997 | Better Than Ever | Thug #1 | |
| 1998 | Rushmore | Coach Beck | |
| 1999 | Chicks | Eddie | TV movie |
| 1999 | Never Been Kissed | School Guard | |
| 2000 | Preston Tylk | Police Officer | |
| 2000 | Merlin: The Return | Arthur's Knight 2 | |
| 2000 | Hijack Stories | Medic #1 | |
| 2000 | Charlie's Angels | Corwin's Driver | |
| 2001 | Zoolander | Hansel's Corner Guy | |
| 2001 | The Royal Tenenbaums | Father Farmer/Tex Hayward/Richie’s hand | |
| 2002 | Showtime | Locker Room Cop #1 | |
| 2002 | Serving Sara | Mr. Andrews | |
| 2003 | Charlie's Angels: Full Throttle | Cop | |
| 2004 | The Big Bounce | Ned Coleman | |
| 2005 | The Wendell Baker Story | – | Director Only |
| 2005 | Fever Pitch | Grant Wade | |
| 2006 | Church Ball | Dennis Buckstead | |
| 2006 | Idiocracy | Beef Supreme | |
| 2009 | Whip It | Razor | |
| 2009 | Calvin Marshall | Ernie | |
| 2010 | How Do You Know | Matty's Teammate | |
| 2010 | High School | Hippie Dude | |
| 2011 | Hall Pass | Larry Bohac | |
| 2011 | The Big Year | Mike Shin | |
| 2014 | Druid Peak | Everett | |
| 2015 | Black Road | Clyde (Voice) | |
| 2017 | Time Trap | Hopper | |
| 2017 | Father Figures | Hotel Desk Clerk | |
| 2024 | Lift | Newscaster (Madrid) | |
