= Idiocracy =

2006 film by Mike Judge

- Theatrical release poster
- Directed by: Mike Judge
- Screenplay by: Mike Judge; Etan Cohen
- Story by: Mike Judge
- Produced by: Elysa Koplovitz; Mike Judge
- Starring: Luke Wilson; Maya Rudolph; Dax Shepard; Terry Crews
- Cinematography: Tim Suhrstedt
- Edited by: David Rennie
- Music by: Theodore Shapiro
- Production companies: 20th Century Fox; Ternion Pictures; Judgmental Films
- Distributed by: 20th Century Fox
- Release date: September 1, 2006
- Running time: 84 minutes
- Country: United States
- Language: English
- Budget: $2.4 million
- Box office: $495,303

Idiocracy is a 2006 American science fiction comedy film directed and produced by Mike Judge, who co-wrote with Etan Cohen. The plot follows United States Army librarian Joe Bauers and prostitute Rita, who undergo a government hibernation experiment and awake five hundred years later to find a devolved dystopian anti-intellectual society. The cast includes Luke Wilson, Maya Rudolph, Dax Shepard, Terry Crews, David Herman, Justin Long, Andrew Wilson, and Brad Jordan.

The concept of Idiocracy dates back to a concept Judge envisioned in 1996. In 2001, Judge finished a script with the working title 3001, and rewrote the film a year later. Filming took place throughout 2004 at Austin Studios and other cities in Texas. Idiocracy serves as a social satire that touches on issues including anti-intellectualism, commercialism, consumerism, dysgenics, voluntary childlessness, and overpopulation.

20th Century Fox was hesitant to promote the film, refused to grant it a wide release, and did not screen it for critics. The decision not to market Idiocracy was seen as unexpected, following the success of Office Space (1999). According to Crews, the film's satirical depiction of corporations made the film financially unviable, while Judge attributed Fox's decision to negative test screenings; Judge stated that Fox believed that the film would develop a cult following through its DVD release, similar to Office Space.

Idiocracy was released in the United States on September 1, 2006. Due to its lack of a major theatrical release, it resulted in a $495,000 box-office gross. The film received positive reviews from critics, and has since become a cult film.

== Plot ==
In 2005, U.S. Army librarian Corporal Joe Bauers tests as the "most average" individual in the entire armed forces and is selected for a one-year suspended animation experiment. Lacking a suitable female candidate, the military hires a prostitute named Rita, dismissing the charges against her and paying off her pimp, Upgrayedd. When the officer in charge is arrested for running his own prostitution ring under Upgrayedd's tutelage, the experiment is forgotten. Over the next five centuries, societal expectations lead the most intelligent humans to choose not to have children while the least intelligent reproduce indiscriminately, and average intelligence and civilization decline.

In 2505, Joe's and Rita's suspension chambers are unearthed by the collapse of a mountain-sized garbage pile; Joe's chamber crashes into the apartment of Frito Pendejo in what was once Washington, D.C.. Joe finds a population that has become profoundly anti-intellectual, speaking only low registers of English and wallowing in overconsumption and crass popular entertainment. Technology is advanced but driven by garish commercialism and often malfunctions. Believing that he is hallucinating, Joe seeks help in a hospital and realizes how long he spent in hibernation. He is arrested for not having a bar code tattoo to pay for his doctor's appointment, and is sent to prison after being assigned the grossly incompetent Frito as his lawyer. Meanwhile Rita also escapes her chamber and resumes work as a prostitute, soon realizing that people have become so gullible that she can charge customers money without providing services.

In prison, Joe is renamed "Not Sure" by a faulty speech-recognition tattooing machine and takes a rudimentary IQ test. He later tells a gullible guard that he is supposed to be in the line of people to be released, and simply walks out. He finds Frito, who tells him a time machine exists that can return Joe and Rita to 2005; in return for taking them there, Joe promises to open a savings account for Frito in the 21st century that will accrue 500 years of compound interest. The time machine is inside a gigantic Costco store, where Joe is identified by a tattoo scanner and apprehended.

Joe is taken to the White House, where President Dwayne Elizondo Mountain Dew Herbert Camacho appoints him Secretary of the Interior, as the IQ test identified him as the most intelligent person alive. Camacho then gives Joe one week to fix the nationwide food shortages, dust bowls, and crippled economy, or be imprisoned. Joe discovers that the nation's crops are irrigated with Brawndo, a "thirst mutilator" whose parent corporation purchased the FDA, FCC, and USDA. Over time the concentration of electrolytes in Brawndo has slowly destroyed the topsoil. Joe has the irrigation systems use plain water, now called “toilet water”, causing opposition from the Cabinet, who keep repeating Brawndo's jingle as the only solution. Brawndo's stock drops to zero and half the population lose their jobs, causing mass riots, and Joe's arrest.

At the Extreme Court, Joe is sentenced to public execution in a monster truck demolition derby by undefeated "rehabilitation officer" Beef Supreme. However, Beef's oversized vehicle causes the arena door to collapse but he survived and fights Joe. By accident Joe manages to defeat the other vehicles. Rita and Frito discover that Joe's reintroduction of water to the soil has allowed vegetation to grow. Rita pays a cameraman to film the sprouting crops for the stadium's Jumbotron prompting Camacho to stop Beef and pardon Joe. Joe and Rita decide to stay in the future after discovering that the time machine was just an amusement ride. Following Camacho's term, Joe is elected president and marries Rita, with whom he has "the three smartest kids in the world", while Frito, who is appointed Vice President, takes eight wives and fathers "32 of the dumbest children to ever walk on Earth". The narrator states that Joe set in motion the chain of events that eventually undid humanity's "dumbing-down". In a post-credits scene, Upgrayedd awakens from his own suspension chamber and sets off in search of Rita.

== Cast ==
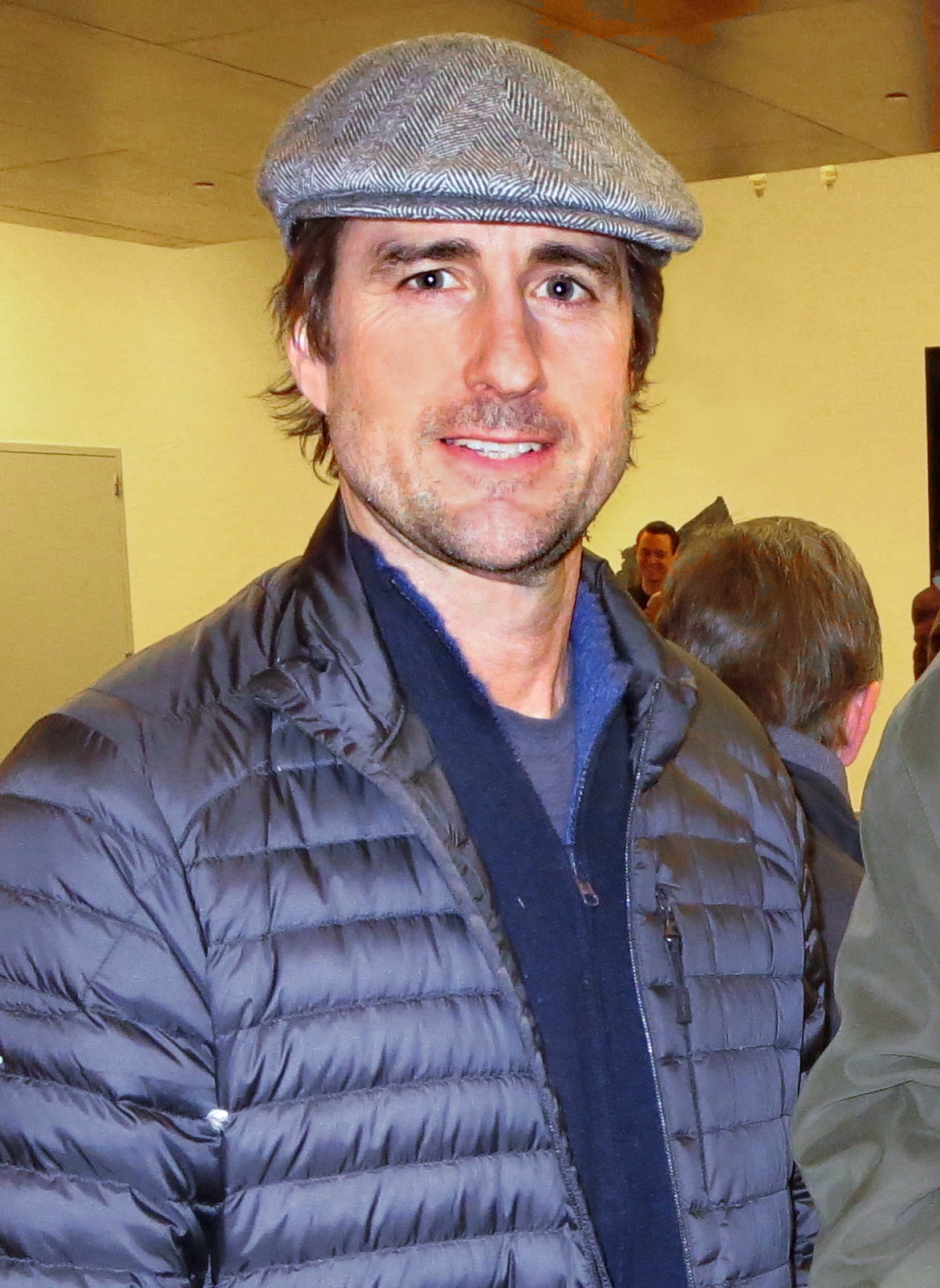
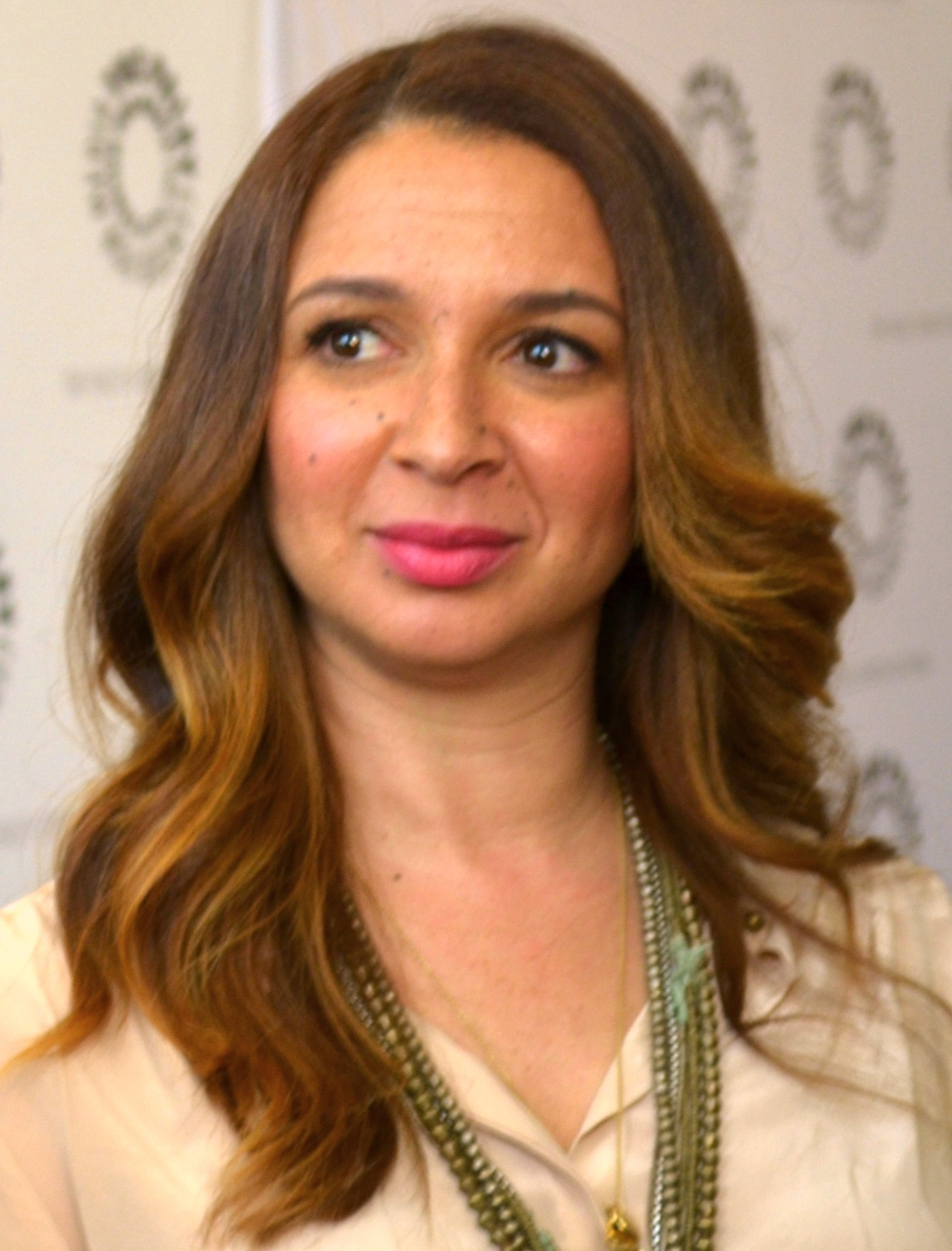
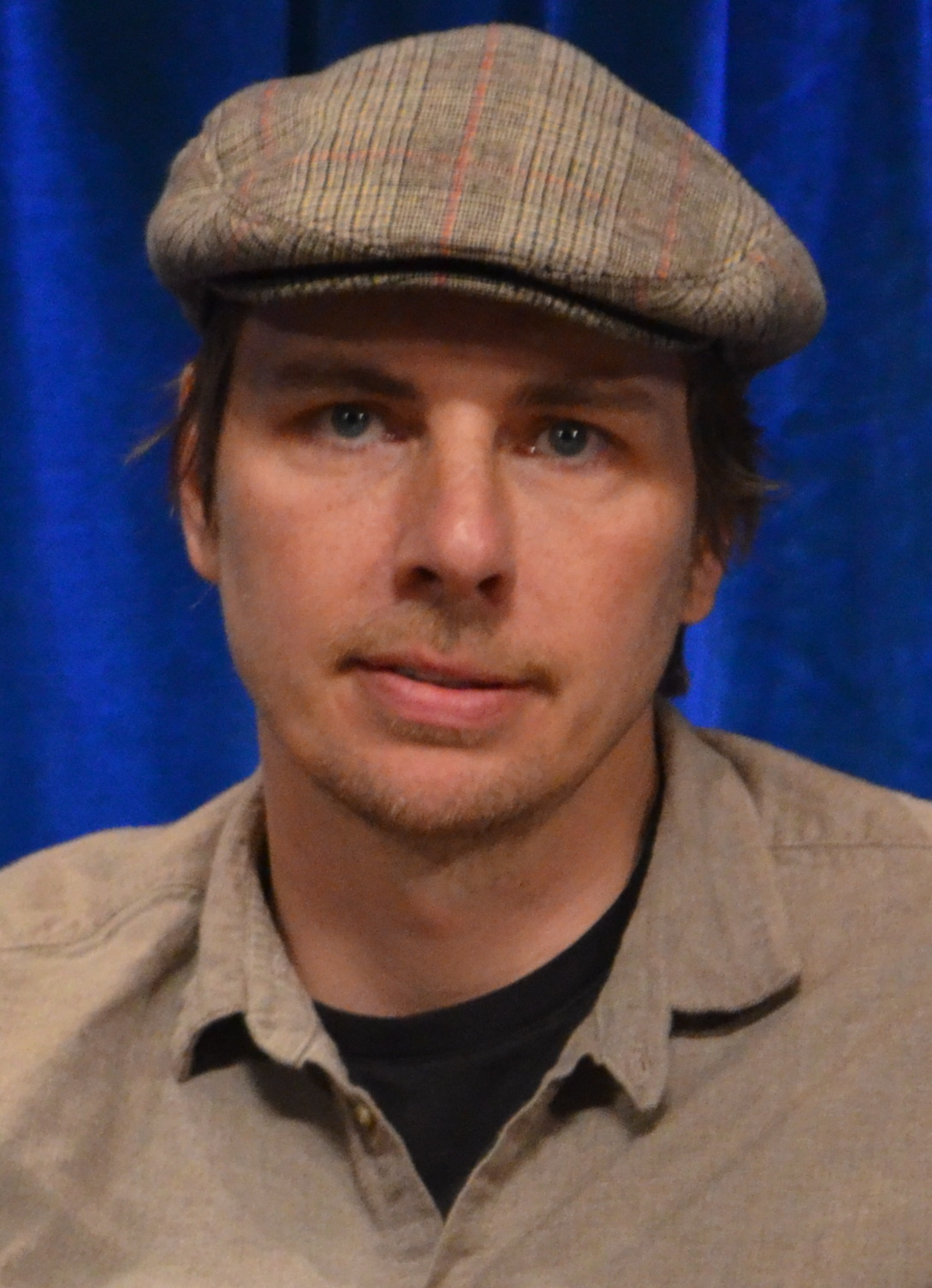
Left to right: Luke Wilson (pictured in 2016), Maya Rudolph (2012), and Dax Shepard (2013)
- Luke Wilson as Joe Bauers / Not Sure – a former librarian in the United States Army and later the President of the United States
- Maya Rudolph as Rita – a prostitute and later the First Lady of the United States
- Dax Shepard as Frito Pendejo – a lawyer and later the Vice President of the United States
- Terry Crews as Dwayne Elizondo Mountain Dew Herbert Camacho – the President of the United States
- Andrew Wilson as Beef Supreme – a rehabilitation officer
- Brad Jordan as Upgrayedd – a pimp
- David Herman as secretary of state
- Justin Long as Doctor Lexus
- Patrick Fischler as Yuppie Husband
- Darlene Hunt as Yuppie Wife
- Ryan Ransdell as Clevon
- Wes Davis as Clevon Jr.
- Robert Musgrave as Sgt. Keller
- Mike McCafferty as Officer Collins
- Sonny Castillo as Prosecutor
- Anthony "Citric" Campos as the Secretary of Defense
- Brendan Hill as the Secretary of Energy
- Thomas Haden Church as Brawndo's chief executive
- Stephen Root as Judge Hector "The Hangman" BMW (uncredited)
- Sara Rue as the attorney general (uncredited).

== Production ==
Early working titles included The United States of Uhh-merica and 3001. Filming took place in 2004 on several stages at Austin Studios and in the Texas cities of Austin, San Marcos, Pflugerville, and Round Rock. In August 2005, Ain't It Cool News' Eric Vespe reported that he had attended a test screening, and reshoots had been conducted on the film to address the appearance of certain brand names in the film. Vespe expressed a positive reaction to the version of the film that he saw.

== Release ==
Idiocracy's original release date was August 5, 2005, according to Mike Judge. In April 2006, a release date was set for September 1, 2006. In August, numerous articles revealed that the release was to be put on hold indefinitely. Idiocracy was released as scheduled but only in seven cities (Los Angeles, Atlanta, Toronto, Chicago, Dallas, Houston, and Mike Judge's hometown, Austin, Texas), and expanded to only 130 theaters, signficantly less than the usual wide release of 600 or more theaters. According to the Austin American-Statesman, 20th Century Fox, the film's distributor, did not promote the film. While posters were released to theaters, no movie trailers, ads, or press kits were released, and only two stills were released for press purposes.

The film was not screened for critics. Lack of concrete information from Fox led to speculation that the distributor may have actively tried to keep the film from being seen by a large audience, while fulfilling a contractual obligation for theatrical release ahead of a DVD release, according to Ryan Pearson of the Associated Press. That speculation was followed by open criticism of the studio's lack of support from Ain't It Cool News, Time, and Esquire. Time's Joel Stein wrote "the film's ads and trailers tested atrociously", but, "still, abandoning Idiocracy seems particularly unjust, since Judge has made a lot of money for Fox."

In The New York Times, Dan Mitchell argued that Fox may have been distancing itself from the film because it did not want to offend its viewers or potential advertisers portrayed negatively in the film. In a 2018 interview with GQ Magazine, Terry Crews, who plays President Camacho, gave credence to this theory, confirming that advertisers were indeed unhappy with how they were portrayed. Crews stated, "The rumor was, because we used real corporations in our comedy (I mean, Starbucks was giving hand jobs), these companies gave us their name thinking they were gonna get 'pumped up', and then we're like, 'Welcome to Costco, we love you' [delivered in monotone]. All these real corporations were like, 'Wait a minute, wait a minute...' A lot of people were trying to back out, but it was too late. And so Fox, who owned the movie, decided, 'We're going to release this in as few theaters as legally possible'. So it got a release in, probably, three theaters over one weekend and it was sucked out, into the vortex".

In 2017, Judge told The New York Times that the film's lack of marketing and wide release was the result of negative test screenings. He added that Fox decided to not give the film a strong marketing push because the distributor believed it would develop a cult following through word-of-mouth and recoup its budget through home video sales, as Judge's previous film Office Space had.

=== Box office ===
From a budget of $2.4 million, Idiocracy earned a worldwide total of $495,303; $444,093 domestically, and $51,210 internationally.

== Reception ==
Although it was not screened in advance for critics, Idiocracy received positive reviews. On Rotten Tomatoes, the film has a score of 71%, with an average rating of 6.4/10, based on 52 reviews. The website's "Critics Consensus" for the film reads, "Frustratingly uneven yet enjoyable overall, Idiocracy skewers society's devolution with an amiably goofy yet deceptively barbed wit." On Metacritic, the film has a score of 66 out of 100, based on reviews from 12 critics, indicating "generally favorable" reviews.

Los Angeles Times reviewer Carina Chocano described it as "spot on" satire and a "pitch-black, bleakly hilarious vision of an American future", although the "plot, naturally, is silly and not exactly bound by logic. But it's Judge's gimlet-eyed knack for nightmarish extrapolation that makes Idiocracy a cathartic delight." In an Entertainment Weekly review, Joshua Rich gave the film an "EW Grade" of "D", stating that "Mike Judge implores us to reflect on a future in which Britney and K-Fed are like the new Adam and Eve." The A.V. Club's Nathan Rabin found Luke Wilson "perfectly cast ... as a quintessential everyman"; and wrote of the film "Like so much superior science fiction, Idiocracy uses a fantastical future to comment on a present. ... There's a good chance that Judge's smartly lowbrow Idiocracy will be mistaken for what it's satirizing." Gerald Casale, a founding member of the new wave band Devo, said Idiocracy is "the movie Devo should have made." John Patterson, critic for The Guardian, wrote, "Idiocracy isn't a masterpiece—Fox seems to have stiffed Judge on money at every stage—but it's endlessly funny", and of the film's popularity, described seeing the film "in a half-empty house. Two days later, same place, same show—packed-out." Brazilian news magazine Veja called the film "politically incorrect", recommending that readers see the DVD and wrote "the film went flying through [American] theaters and did not open in Brazil. Proof that the future contemplated by Judge is not that far away."

Critic Alexandre Koball of the Brazilian website CinePlayers.com gave the movie a score of 5 out of 5. Another staff reviewer wrote, "Idiocracy is not exactly ... funny nor ... innovative but it's a movie to make you think, even if for five minutes. And for that it manages to stay one level above the terrible average of comedy movies released in the last years in the United States."

== Home media ==
Idiocracy was released on DVD on January 9, 2007. It has earned $9 million from DVD rentals, over 20 times its domestic box-office gross of under $450,000. In the UK, uncut versions of the film were shown on satellite channel Sky Comedy on February 26, 2009, with the Freeview premiere shown on Film4 on April 26, 2009.

== Spin-offs ==
In August 2012, Crews said he was in talks with director Judge and Fox over a possible Idiocracy spin-off featuring his President Camacho character, initially conceived as a web series. A week before the 2012 elections, he reprised the character in a series of short sketches for Funny or Die. Before the 2016 presidential election, Rolling Stone published an article stating that Judge and Cohen would produce Idiocracy-themed campaign ads opposing Donald Trump's presidential campaign if given permission from Fox to do so. Crews later told Business Insider that the ads would not go forward as planned, but that they would have featured Camacho wrestling in a cage match against the other candidates.

== Legacy ==
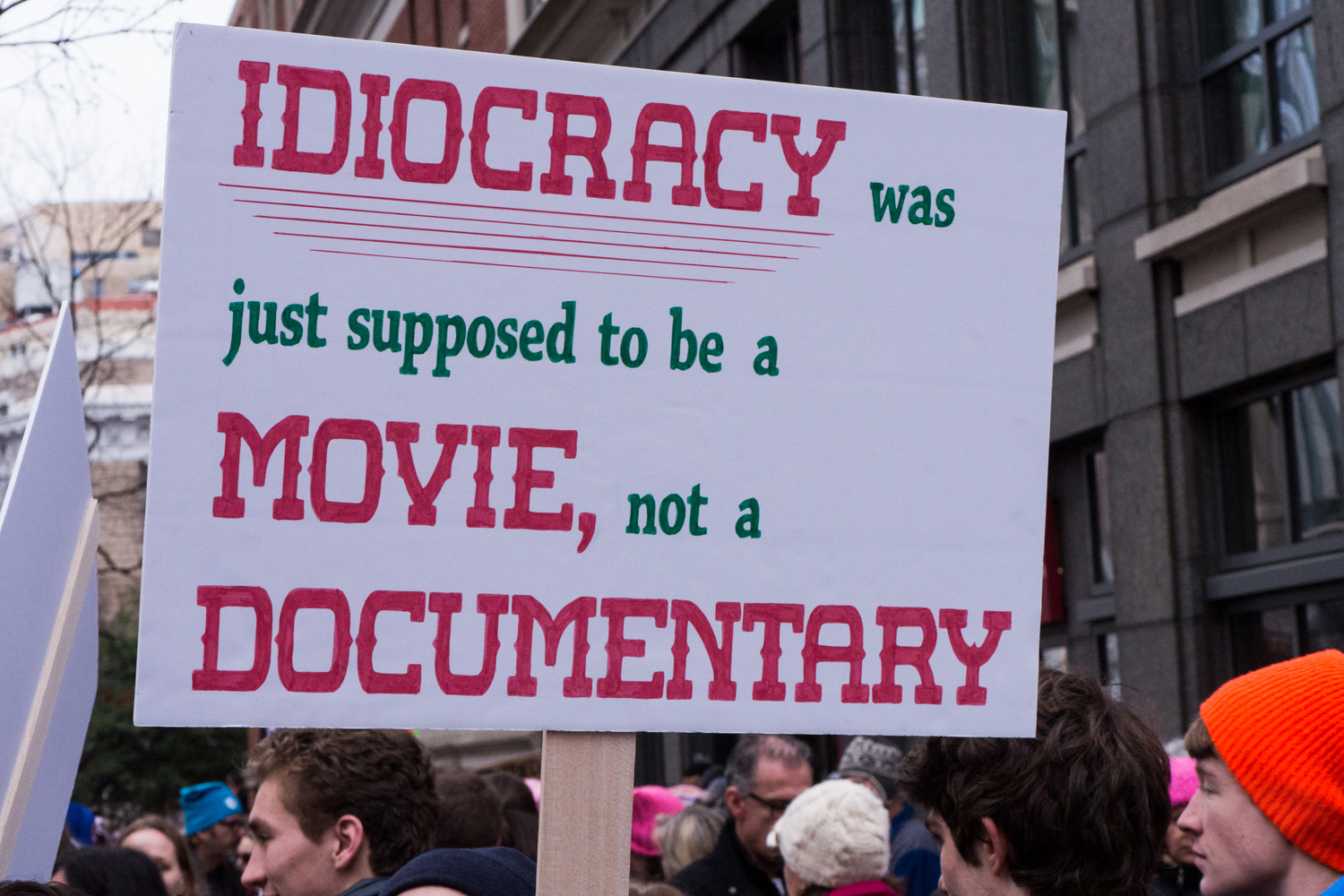
A placard during the 2017 Women's March.

During the 2016 Republican Party presidential primaries, the film's co-writer Etan Cohen and others expressed opinions that the film's predictions were converging on accuracy, a sentiment repeated by director Judge during the elections that year. At the time, Judge also compared Republican presidential nominee Donald Trump—who was later elected president—to the film's pro wrestler-turned-president Camacho. When asked about predicting the future, he quipped, "I'm no prophet, I was off by 490 years."

Comparisons have been made between the film and Trump's first presidency. An article for Collider pointed out the ways in which Trump's positions echoed the political decisions of the characters in the film in areas such as science, business, entertainment, environment, healthcare, law enforcement, and politics. Internet memes have spawned comparisons to Trump and characters in the film.

The comparisons resurfaced when Trump became president again in 2025, and became referenced again in 2026. Idiocracy topped a New York Times poll of which films readers felt best captured the American experience, conducted for the United States Semiquincentennial.

== See also ==
- Dumbing down
- Kakistocracy
- The Gene Bomb, a 1996 non-fiction book
- "The Marching Morons", a 1951 science fiction story
- "The Day the Earth Stood Stupid", an episode of Futurama
