= Luke Wilson =

American actor (born 1971)

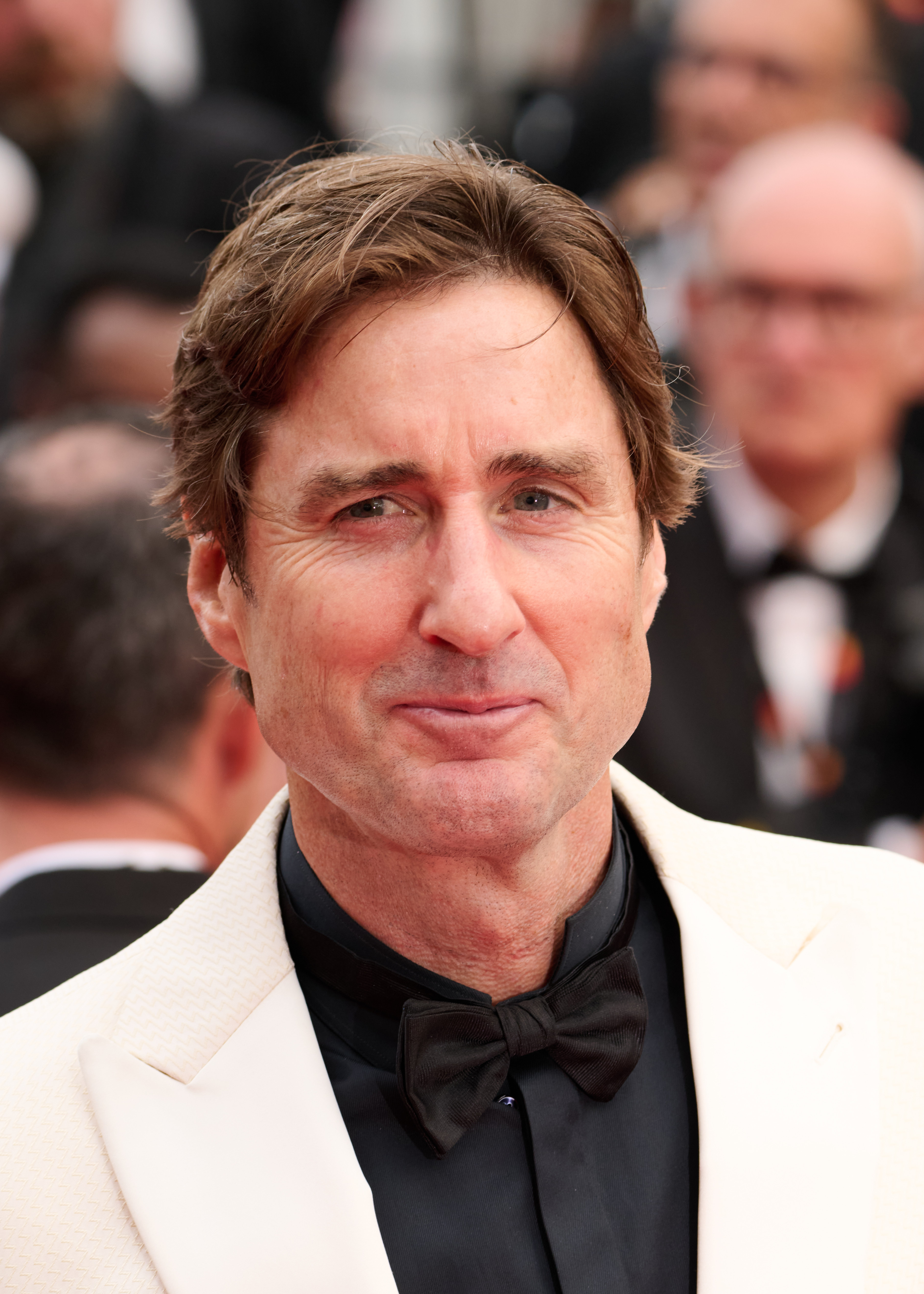
- Wilson in 2025
- Born: Luke Cunningham Wilson; September 21, 1971 (age 55); Dallas, Texas, U.S.
- Occupation: Actor
- Years active: 1994–present
- Partner: Kendall Yates
- Children: 1
- Mother: Laura Wilson
- Relatives: Andrew Wilson (brother); Owen Wilson (brother)

Luke Cunningham Wilson (born September 21, 1971) is an American actor. He is best known for his work with filmmaker Wes Anderson, appearing in Anderson's Bottle Rocket (1996), Rushmore (1998) and The Royal Tenenbaums (2001). Wilson is also known as part of the Frat Pack, with whom he has starred in comedic films Bongwater (1997), Old School (2003), The Wendell Baker Story (2005) and Brad's Status (2017).

His other prominent film roles have included Blue Streak (1999), Charlie's Angels (2000), Legally Blonde (2001), The Family Stone (2005), Concussion (2015), Zombieland: Double Tap (2019) and the Horizon: An American Saga series (2024–present).

On television, Wilson played Casey Kelso on That '70s Show (2002–2005), Levi Callow on Enlightened (2011–2013) and Pat Dugan / S.T.R.I.P.E. on Stargirl (2020–2022).

== Early life ==
Wilson was born on September 21, 1971 in Dallas, the youngest of three sons of Robert Andrew Wilson, an advertising and television executive, and Laura Cunningham, a photographer. His family, originally from Massachusetts, is of Irish Catholic descent.

All three Wilson boys attended St. Mark's School of Texas. According to Owen, Luke was voted class president the first year he attended St. Mark's. He became interested in acting while attending Occidental College in Los Angeles.

== Career ==
Wilson's acting career began with the lead role in the short film Bottle Rocket in 1994 which was co-written by his older brother Owen and director Wes Anderson. It was remade as a feature-length film in 1996. After moving to Hollywood with his two brothers, he was cast opposite Calista Flockhart in Telling Lies in America and made a cameo appearance in the film-within-the-film of Scream 2, both in 1997. Wilson filmed back-to-back romantic films in 1998, opposite Drew Barrymore, Best Men, about a group of friends who pull off a heist on their way to a wedding, and Home Fries which is about two brothers interested in the same woman for different reasons. He played the surgeon beau of a schoolteacher in Rushmore (also released in 1998) also directed by Anderson and co-written by his brother Owen.

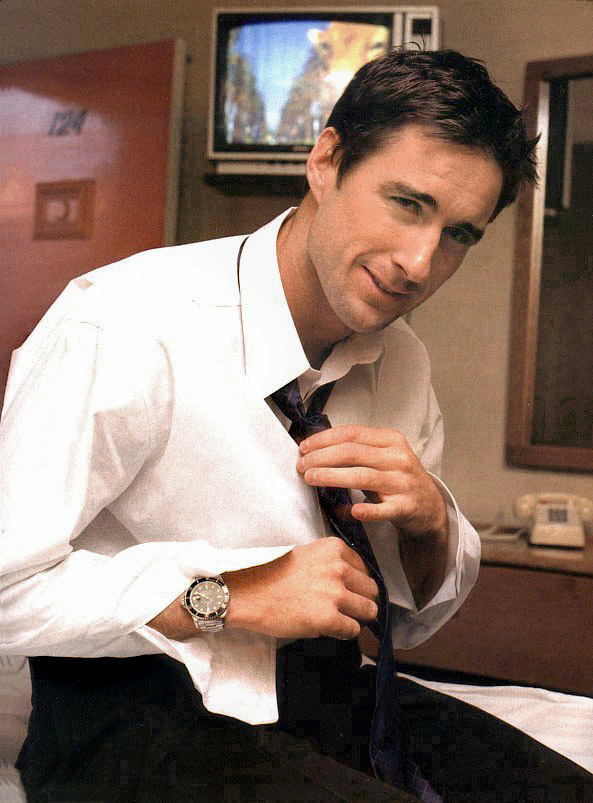
Wilson in 2003

In 1999, he portrayed Detective Carlson in Blue Streak. He later appeared opposite Frankie Muniz in the 2000 comedy-drama My Dog Skip, Cameron Diaz, Drew Barrymore and Lucy Liu in the 2000 action comedy Charlie's Angels, and Reese Witherspoon in the 2001 comedy Legally Blonde. It was followed by The Royal Tenenbaums (2001), Old School (2003), Charlie's Angels: Full Throttle (2003), Legally Blonde 2: Red, White and Blonde (2003), and Anchorman: The Legend of Ron Burgundy (2004). Wilson also had a role on That '70s Show, as Michael Kelso's older brother Casey Kelso appearing sporadically from 2002 through 2005.

In 2006, Wilson starred in My Super Ex-Girlfriend, opposite Uma Thurman, and Idiocracy, a dystopian comedy directed by Mike Judge. Wilson portrayed an ordinary serviceman frozen in a cryogenics project. He awakens after hundreds of years in an America which is significantly less intelligent.

In 2007, Wilson starred in the thriller Vacancy, opposite Kate Beckinsale, and Blonde Ambition. In the same year, he appeared in You Kill Me, 3:10 to Yuma, Blades of Glory, and worked on Henry Poole is Here in La Mirada, California which was released in 2008. In 2009, he starred in Tenure. In 2010, he appeared in films Death at a Funeral, which reunited him with his Blue Streak co-star Martin Lawrence, and Middle Men. From 2011 to 2013 he starred in the HBO TV series Enlightened. He followed this up with roles in The Skeleton Twins (2014), Meadowland (2015), Brad's Status (2017), and Zombieland: Double Tap (2019).

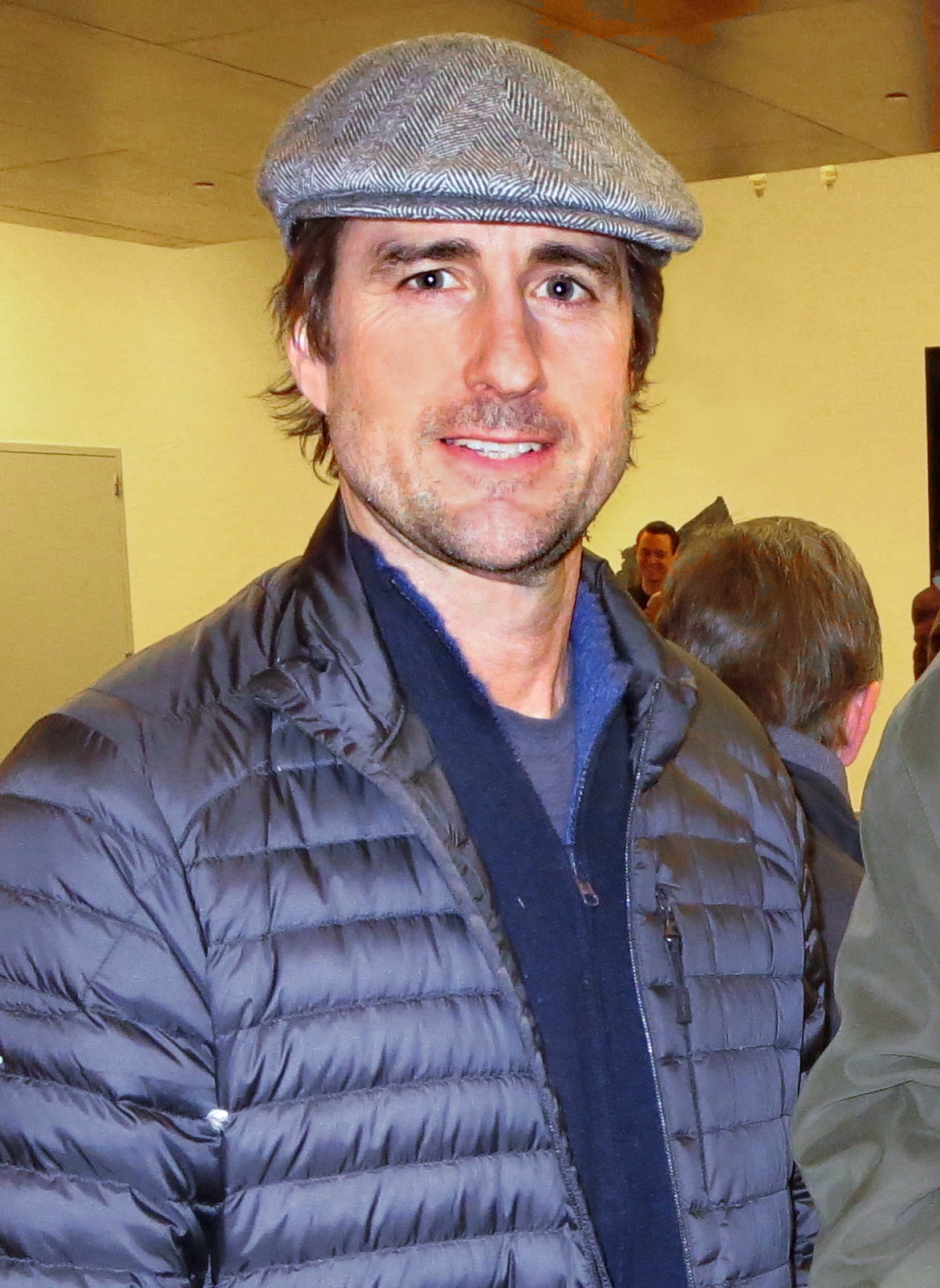
Wilson in 2016

Since 2020, Wilson stars in the DC Universe/The CW series Stargirl as sidekick-turned-mechanic-turned superhero Pat Dugan / S.T.R.I.P.E.

In 2023, he starred in the HBO Max animated series Fired on Mars as Jeffrey Cooper, a graphic designer for a business on Mars whose life is changed upon his termination.

Wilson has written a Wright Brothers biopic with his brother Owen, in which they also plan to star.

== Personal life ==
Wilson was formerly in a relationship with Home Fries co-star Drew Barrymore.

In a 2019 interview, he commented on the fact that he has publicly expressed interest in starting a family since 1996, saying, "I'm 47, I'm ready for that. I need to get to work."

On July 7, 2026, Wilson and his girlfriend of several years, Kendall Yates, who is thirty years his junior, revealed that they had welcomed their first child together, a daughter.

== Filmography ==
=== Film ===
Year	Title	Role	Notes
1994	Bottle Rocket	Anthony Adams	Short
1996	Bottle Rocket	Anthony Adams	
1997	Bongwater	David	
1997	Telling Lies in America	Henry	
1997	Best Men	Jesse Reilly	
1997	Scream 2	Himself / Stab Billy Loomis	Plays a character in the film-within-a-film Stab.
1998	Dog Park	Andy	
1998	Home Fries	Dorian Montier	
1998	Rushmore	Dr. Peter Flynn	
1999	Kill the Man	Stanley Simon	
1999	Blue Streak	Detective Carlson	
2000	My Dog Skip	Dink Jenkins	
2000	Committed	Carl	
2000	Preston Tylk	Preston Tylk	
2000	Charlie's Angels	Peter Kominsky	
2001	Legally Blonde	Emmett Richmond	
2001	Soul Survivors	Jude	
2001	The Royal Tenenbaums	Richard "Richie" Tenenbaum	
2002	The Third Wheel	Stanley	
2003	Masked and Anonymous	Bobby Cupid	
2003	Old School	Mitch Martin	
2003	Stuck on You	Himself	
2003	Alex and Emma	Alex Sheldon / Adam Shipley	
2003	Charlie's Angels: Full Throttle	Peter Kominsky	
2003	Legally Blonde 2: Red, White and Blonde	Emmett Richmond	
2004	Around the World in 80 Days	Orville Wright	
2004	Anchorman: The Legend of Ron Burgundy	Frank Vitchard	
2004	Wake Up, Ron Burgundy: The Lost Movie	Frank Vitchard	Direct-to-video
2005	The Wendell Baker Story	Wendell Baker	Also director, writer and producer
2005	The Family Stone	Ben Stone	
2006	Hoot	Officer David Delinko	
2006	Mini's First Time	John Garson	
2006	My Super Ex-Girlfriend	Matt Saunders	
2006	Idiocracy	Corporal Joe Bauers	
2006	Jackass Number Two	Himself	Guest appearance
2007	You Kill Me	Tom	
2007	Vacancy	David Fox	
2007	3:10 to Yuma	Zeke	
2007	Blades of Glory	Sex Class Instructor	
2007	Battle for Terra	Lt. James "Jim" Stanton	Voice
2007	Blonde Ambition	Ben	
2008	Henry Poole Is Here	Henry Poole	
2008	Vacancy 2: The First Cut	David Fox	Archive footage
2009	Tenure	Charlie Thurber	
2010	Death at a Funeral	Derek	
2010	Middle Men	Jack Harris	
2012	Meeting Evil	John	
2012	Straight A's	William	
2013	Move Me Brightly	The Interviewer	Documentary
2014	The Skeleton Twins	Lance	
2014	Satellite Beach	Warren Flowers	Also Director and screenwriter
2014	Ride	Ian	
2015	Playing It Cool	Samson	
2015	Meadowland	Phil	
2015	The Ridiculous 6	Danny	
2015	Concussion	Roger Goodell	
2016	Outlaws and Angels	Josiah	
2016	Dear Eleanor	Bob Potter	
2016	All We Had	Lee	
2016	Rock Dog	Bodi	Voice
2016	Approaching the Unknown	Louis Skinner	
2017	Brad's Status	Jason Hatfield	
2017	The Girl Who Invented Kissing	Leo	
2018	Arizona	Scott	
2018	Measure of a Man	Marty Marks	
2018	High Voltage	Rick	
2019	Berlin, I Love You	Burke Linz	
2019	Phil	Detective Welling	
2019	Guest of Honour	Father Greg	
2019	The Goldfinch	Larry Decker	
2019	Zombieland: Double Tap	Albuquerque	
2020	All the Bright Places	James	
2020	Bobbleheads: The Movie	Earl	Voice; Direct-to-video
2020	The Swing of Things	Luke	Direct-to-video
2021	12 Mighty Orphans	Rusty Russell	
2021	The Cleaner	Jim Russell	
2022	Gasoline Alley	Detective Freddy Vargas	
2022	Look Both Ways	Rick	
2023	Miranda's Victim	Lawrence Turoff	
2023	The Best Man	Cal	
2023	Fingernails	Duncan	
2023	Merry Little Batman	Batman / Bruce Wayne	Voice
2024	You Gotta Believe	Bobby Ratliff	
2024	Horizon: An American Saga – Chapter 1	Matthew Van Weyden	
2024	Horizon: An American Saga – Chapter 2	Matthew Van Weyden	
2027	The Families Stone	Ben Stone	Filming
TBA	Horizon: An American Saga – Chapter 3	Matthew Van Weyden	Filming
TBA	Plus/Minus		Post-production

=== Television ===
Year	Title	Role	Notes
1998	The X-Files	Sheriff Hartwell	Episode: "Bad Blood"
2001–2004	That '70s Show	Casey Kelso	6 episodes
2004	Entourage	Himself	Episode: "Talk Show"
2004	Saturday Night Live	Himself (host)	Episode: "Luke Wilson/U2"
2011–2013	Enlightened	Levi Callow	11 episodes
2013	Drunk History	Will Keith Kellogg	Episode: "Detroit"
2016	Roadies	Bill	10 episodes
2019	Room 104	Remus	Episode: "The Plot"
2020–2022	Stargirl	Pat Dugan / S.T.R.I.P.E.	Main role
2020–2021	Emergency Call	Himself (host)	10 episodes
2021	Saturday Night Live	Himself (cameo)	Episode: "Owen Wilson/Kacey Musgraves"
2023	Fired on Mars	Jeff Cooper (voice)	Main role
2024	No Good Deed	JD Campbell	Main role
2025	Bat-Fam	Batman / Bruce Wayne (voice)	Main role
2026	Bad Thoughts	Mark	Episode: "Bad Decisions"
2026	The Hawk	Golden Fisk	7 episodes

== See also ==
- Notable alumni of St. Mark's School of Texas
