= The Wendell Baker Story =

- Theatrical release poster
- Directed by: Andrew Wilson; Luke Wilson
- Written by: Luke Wilson
- Produced by: David L. Bushell; Mark Johnson
- Starring: Luke Wilson; Eva Mendes; Owen Wilson; Eddie Griffin; Kris Kristofferson; Harry Dean Stanton; Seymour Cassel; Will Ferrell
- Cinematography: Steve Mason
- Edited by: Harvey Rosenstock; Peter Teschner
- Music by: Aaron Zigman
- Production companies: Mobius Entertainment; MHF Zweite Academy Film; Franchise Pictures (uncredited)
- Distributed by: THINKFilm
- Release dates: March 11, 2005 (SXSW); May 18, 2007 (United States)
- Running time: 99 minutes
- Country: United States
- Language: English
- Budget: $8 million
- Box office: $153,169

The Wendell Baker Story is a 2005 American comedy film directed by Luke Wilson and Andrew Wilson and starring Luke Wilson, Eva Mendes, Owen Wilson, Eddie Griffin, Kris Kristofferson, Harry Dean Stanton, Seymour Cassel, and Will Ferrell. It premiered at the 2005 South by Southwest Film Festival in Austin, Texas, in March 2005. It is the final film produced by Franchise Pictures.

Ex-con Wendell Baker is working in a retirement home, trying to win his former love-interest Doreen back, but he finds many obstacles along the way.

== Plot ==
Wendell Baker, a good-hearted but misdirected young man, has built up a successful albeit illegal fake-ID business for undocumented immigrants crossing the US-Mexico border. Caught by an undercover police officer, he is sent to jail.

At first, his girlfriend Doreen visits regularly, but as he'd never expressed his feelings to her, she doubts that he loves her back. After a visit, one that he cuts short to return playing a match, seeing him too well-adjusted in jail, she decides to move on. He realises when she stops visiting and returns his letters.

Wendell's friend and former partner in making the IDs, Reyes, picks him up when released, but after dinner he tells him his partner won't let him stay friends with him anymore. The next day, before Wendell's arrival at his appointed job in a retirement home, Neil, the home's head nurse, talks about how easily he'll be able to use the unknowing newcomer as a scapegoat.

In a local supermarket buying supplies for the home, Wendell spots a photo of Doreen with the clerk, so he hangs around until she comes in. The clerk, Dave, catches him watching her, punches him and then threatens him to keep his distance. As Wendell is leaving Doreen catches up with him, insists she has moved on and suggests he does the same.

Back at the home, Neil reiterates to the orderly that Wendell would be ideal to frame if necessary as he's clueless. Wendell, in the meantime, becomes close to some of the residents as they see he is sincere and caring.

One evening, Neil takes Wendell aside and tells him about a scam he runs on the residents. Little by little, he ships off residents to somewhere in Oklahoma, illegally selling their medications and taking a part of their Medicare checks. Neil tries to blackmail him into silence.

Instead, the next day Wendell wakes with a new sense of purpose. He visits Reyes, saying they will soon be back in business. He then returns to the home, enlisting three residents, Skip, Boyd and Nasher, to get those who'd disappeared to Oklahoma back. Nasher flies them there and back and decides to stay on the road.

Wendell helps the remaining residents to fight the corrupt staff by getting them in trouble. Skip and Boyd get two teenage girls they had befriended to help get Neil and his right-hand-man arrested for attempted statutory rape.

A short time later two representatives of Nasher, who turns out to be a reclusive oil tycoon, come seeking Wendell as he wants him to manage several of his luxury hotels. One day, Skip coaxes Wendell down to the waterfront, where Boyd is bringing Doreen to him by boat. He races to her with their dog and enfolds her in an embrace.

== Cast ==
- Luke Wilson as Wendell Baker
- Eva Mendes as Doreen
- Jacob Vargas as Reyes Morales
- Owen Wilson as Neil King
- Harry Dean Stanton as Skip Summers
- Kris Kristofferson as L. R. Nasher
- Seymour Cassel as Boyd Fullbright
- Eddie Griffin as McTeague
- Will Ferrell as Dave Bix
- Mac Davis as Agent Buck
- Glen Powell as Paper Boy Travis
- Buck Taylor as Bob Draper

== Production notes ==
The film was developed through Mobius Entertainment and produced by Mark Johnson of CBS. It was filmed in Austin, Texas and was released on DVD for rental in a number of European countries, and was distributed theatrically by ThinkFilm starting on May 18, 2007. It was released on DVD in the United States on October 30, 2007.

== Reception ==
On the review aggregator website Rotten Tomatoes, 40% of 42 critics' reviews are positive. The website's consensus reads: "The Wendell Baker Story is a lackadaisical comedy of quirky characters and situations, but ultimately the lazy narrative bores instead of charms." Metacritic, which uses a weighted average, assigned the film a score of 44 out of 100, based on 15 critics, indicating "mixed or average" reviews.

== See also ==
- McTeague, the 1899 novel by Frank Norris
