= Louis Black =

American journalist

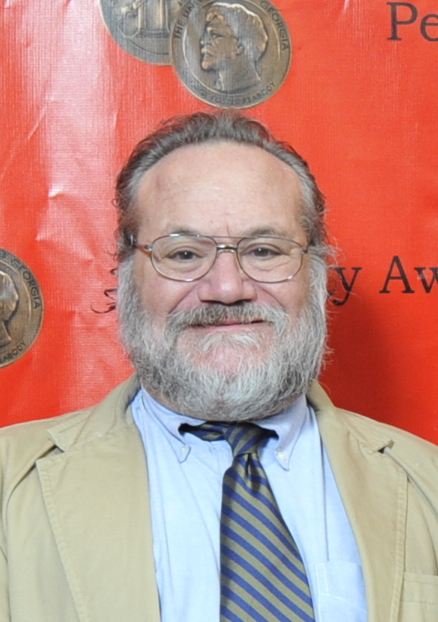
- Louis Black at the 69th Annual Peabody Awards
- Born: Teaneck, New Jersey, U.S.
- Occupations: Founder, editor

Louis Black is an American journalist and businessman who is the co-founder of The Austin Chronicle, an alternative weekly newspaper published in Austin, Texas, and was the newspaper's editor from its inception until his retirement on August 8, 2017. He has written over 600 articles in his column in that newspaper. Black is also the co-founder of the South by Southwest Festival, also located in Austin, although the festival operates separately from the Chronicle. He also is a founding partner in Toronto's North by Northeast music and film festival.

Black was born in Teaneck, New Jersey where he was childhood friends with film critic Leonard Maltin and singer Phoebe Snow. Maltin and Black attended Teaneck High School and regularly prowled the rep cinemas of Manhattan as teens before graduating in 1968. He moved to Austin to study film at The University of Texas where he received a BFA in 1980, and became knowledgeable about B-movies, including the work of Russ Meyer. Black helped run film nights at the university before starting the Chronicle with film friend Nick Barbaro.

Black was an original board member of the Austin Film Society and is a past president of that organization. In 2000, Texas Monthly Editor Evan Smith and Black working with AFS established the Texas Film Hall of Fame.

He was executive producer of a documentary on Texan songwriter Townes Van Zandt. In addition to serving as executive producer, he also directed a documentary about Austin director Richard Linklater which premiered on PBS's American Masters. He appeared in the film The Devil and Daniel Johnston as Black was an early supporter of the singer.

In October 2023 Black and the Austin Chronicle were sued for alleged harassment, abuse, and "sexual servitude."
