= Black Hand =

Black Hand or The Black Hand may refer to:

== Criminal and underground groups ==
- Black Hand (La Mano Negra), 1919–1924 Mexican-American raiders of the Tierra Amarilla Land Grant
- Black Hand (anarchism) (La Mano Negra), a presumed secret, anarchist organization based in the Andalusian region of Spain during the early 1880s
- Black Hand (extortion), an extortion racket practised by the Camorra and Mafia members in Italy and the United States
  - Black Hand (Chicago), the extortion as practised in Chicago
- Black Hand (Egypt) (al-Yad al-Sawda), an Egyptian nationalist anti-British occupation group in the Sultanate of Egypt in the 1910s
- Black Hand (Mandatory Palestine) (al-Kaff al-Aswad), an Islamist militant group in the British Mandate of Palestine in the 1930s
- Black Hand (Serbia) (Crna ruka), a secret society devoted to Serbian unification in the 1910s
- Black Hand (Slovenia) (Črna roka), an anti-communist organization that carried out assassinations in the Slovene Lands during World War II
- Yiddish Black Hand, a.k.a. Jewish Black Hand Association, a criminal organization that operated on New York's Lower East Side during the early 20th century

== People ==
- Black Hand (graffiti artist), Iranian street artist
- José Manuel Martínez (born 1962), known as "El Mano Negra", former Mexican drug cartel hitman
- Mano Negra (wrestler) (born 1951), Mexican luchador (professional wrestler)

== Art, entertainment, and media ==
- Black Hand Gang, a children's comics series by Hans Jürgen Press
- The Black Hand (book), a non-fiction book by Stephan Talty
- Mano Negra (band), a French alternative, ska punk band

=== Characters ===
- Black Hand (character), a DC Comics supervillain
- Black Hand (World of Darkness), fictional sect of vampires
- Black Hand, a mercenary faction in Just Cause

=== Film ===
- The Black Hand (1906 film), an American silent gangster film, directed by Wallace McCutcheon Sr.
- The Black Hand (1917 film), a 1917 Austrian silent crime film
- Black Hand (1950 film), an American film noir, starring Gene Kelly as an Italian immigrant fighting the Black Hand extortion racket
- The Black Hand (1968 film), a French-Italian crime thriller film
- The Black Hand (1973 film), an Italian crime film starring Lionel Stander as a cop who infiltrates the Mafia
