= Stephan Talty =

Irish American journalist and author (born c. 1960)

Stephan Talty (born 1964) is an Irish American journalist and author born in Buffalo, New York, to parents from County Clare. He is famous for creating the character of Abbie Kearney, a fictional female detective who pursues serial killers in Buffalo. He also co‑wrote A Captain's Duty, about the 2009 hijacking of a ship by Somali pirates.

== Career ==
Talty attended Bishop Timon High School in Buffalo, New York and Amherst College in Massachusetts, before finding employment as a journalist with the Miami Herald. During the 1990s, he went freelance in Dublin and New York, and contributed articles for the New York Times Magazine, GQ, Playboy, the Irish Times, and the Chicago Review.

In addition to writing detective fiction, Talty has written several nonfiction books on crime and American history. He co‑wrote the book that was the basis for Captain Phillips, and wrote The Black Hand, a novelization about the killing of Italian American cop Joe Petrosino in 1909.

In 2013, the movie Captain Phillips was released in the US, directed by Paul Greengrass and starring Tom Hanks and Barkhad Abdi. The screenplay by Billy Ray was based on the 2010 book A Captain's Duty: Somali Pirates, Navy SEALS, and Dangerous Days at Sea by Richard Phillips with Stephan Talty as co-writer.

In 2017, Paramount Pictures announced that it had acquired the movie rights to Talty's upcoming novel The Black Hand. Leonardo DiCaprio would star as Joe Petrosino, and the film was due for release in 2018.

== Works ==
- Mulatto America: At the Crossroads of Black and White Culture: A Social History (2004)
- Empire of Blue Water - Captain Morgan’s Great Pirate Army (2008)
- The Illustrious Dead: The Terrifying Story of How Typhus Killed Napoleon's Greatest Army (2009)
- A Captain's Duty (2010), with captain Richard Phillips
- Escape from the Land of Snows: The Young Dalai Lama's Harrowing Flight to Freedom and the Making of a Spiritual Hero (2010)
- Agent Garbo (2012)
- Black Irish: A Novel (2013)
- Hangman: A Novel (2014)
- Operation Cowboy: The Secret American Mission to Save the World’s Most Beautiful Horses in the Last Days of World War II (2014)
- The Secret Agent: In Search of America's Greatest World War II Spy (2014)
- War Hero: The Unlikely Story of A Stray Dog, An American Soldier and the Battle of Their Lives (2015)
- The Black Hand (2017) (a novel about the crime organization)
- Speed Girl: Janet Guthrie and the Race That Changed Sports Forever (2017)
- Saving Bravo: The Greatest Rescue Mission in Navy SEAL History (2018)
- Koresh: The True Story of David Koresh and the Tragedy at Waco (2023)

== Filmography ==
- Captain Phillips (2013)
- The Black Hand (2018)
