= Aftermath of Springfield race riot of 1908 =

Effects of race riot in Illinois, U.S.

The Springfield race riot of 1908 was an act of mass racial violence committed against African Americans by a mob of white Americans and European immigrants in Springfield, Illinois, between August 14 and 16, 1908. The riot was caused by the accusations and arrest of two black men, Joe James and George Richardson. James was accused of murdering Clergy Ballard and attempting to rape his daughter, Blanche, in a home invasion. Richardson was accused of raping Mabel Hallam. The police and white residents used scant evidence to back these accusations.

A mob of mostly white residents gathered at Sangamon County Jail, demanding the release of James and Richardson, so they could lynch them. Sheriff Werner staged a distraction, while Harry Loper drove James and Richardson to McLean County Jail for their own safety. After the crowd learned that Loper and Werner arranged the suspects' transfer, they proceeded to riot in "the Levee" and "the Badlands" area.

In the immediate aftermath, 17 people died (including two who died of suicide), an unknown number injured, property damage amounted to $150,000 (approximately $5 million in 2024), and 2,000 black residents left the city.

In the wake of the riot, Richardson would be released after authorities concluded the alleged rapist had a sexually transmitted infection and found no such disease on Richardson. James would be hanged at the Sangamon County Jail after proven guilty by an all-white jury on October 23, 1908. Approximately 150 mob participants were arrested, though few would ever be convicted. One notable example would be Abraham Raymer, who was convicted of petty larceny. Spending only 30 days in jail and paying a $25 fine.

== Background ==
=== Home invasion and murder of Clergy Ballard ===
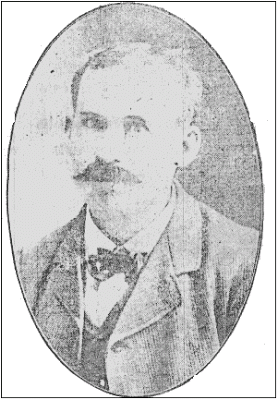
Clergy Ballard, pictured in 1900

Clergy Ballard's 16-year-old daughter, Blanche, returned home after midnight on the early mourning of July 5. Blanche alleged to have just fallen asleep, when she was awakened by the presence of "a strange form" lying at the foot of her bed. Thinking it was her brother, Charles, arriving home, Blanche touched the dark figure and asked, "Is that you, Charlie?" She received no answer. Then she asked if it was Charles again, then grabbed the "form's" hand and felt alleged "hard substances" in it. Frightened by the touch, she flinched, and "the form jumped away, mumbled something and ran into the parlor." Where he proceeded to go from room to room.

Blanche called out to her mother, Gertrude, which was said to have awakened her father. Ballard went to Blanche's room, and tried to approach the man. However, "before Ballard could close in on the man," he fled. In his undergarments, "not knowing exactly which way the intruder had gone," Ballard reportedly went outside to his front porch, where he allegedly "encountered a negro who was coming around the house." Ballard was then attacked by the attacker with either a knife or a razor. It was unknown how the fight transpired, but Ballard was reportedly "cut to ribbons" with a sharp weapon, presumed to have been a razor. After he was cut, Ballard allegedly "staggered back to the porch." Ballard would be labeled a hero who prevented a rape against his daughter.

Homer and Charles, Ballard's sons, ran outside and chased the attacker. Rather than continue to chase the attacker, they retreated back home, to help their father. As they were helping Ballard off the ground, Ballard allegedly raised his head and pointed to a man standing. Ballard told his sons, "There's the negro now. For God's sakes, get him boys, for he's killed me." Charles and Homer left their father again, and the two chased the man again. Some of Ballard's neighbors also joined the pursuit. Ballard's family then brought him inside their home and tried to help him, but could not "stanch the gust of blood." Police Chief Wilbur F. Morris was awakened and alerted. He placed every officer in town on alert. The police took Ballard to Springfield Hospital. Clergy Ballard succumbed to his wounds and died around 11:45 a.m.

=== Joe James found ===
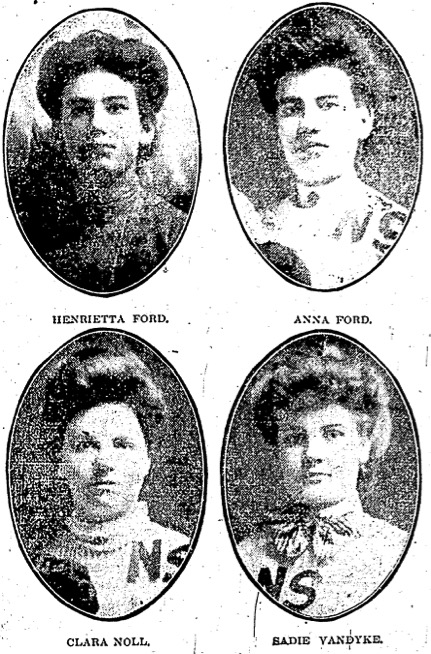
The four white women, pictured in the Illinois State Journal, who found Joe James

On July 5, Joe James was discovered by four white women (Clara Noll, Sadie Van Dyke, Anna Ford, and Henrietta Ford) sleeping off a hangover, in the North End. Only half-mile away from the Ballard home. Previously, James was drinking, gambling, and playing the piano in the Levee area, Springfield's Black district of saloons and brothels. While two of the girls watched James, the other two went to a park phone and called the Ballard home, asking for men to come there to investigate. Charles and Homer, along with two neighbors, Pledge Sears and Joseph Edwards, went to where James was sleeping.

The men allegedly found James with blood on his clothes, and a coat "thrown over his head." They woke him and beat him while a crowd gathered around to watch. The Ballard brothers, Sears and Edwards, dragged James for half a block, beating him while the crowd chanted "Kill!" It was "only the arrival of officers" that prevented the mob from killing James. James made no effort to resist or defend himself, even as he was dragged for half-a-block toward a nearby telephone with the intent of lynching him. Three deputies then stepped in, stopped the men from beating James, and arrested James. He was booked into the jail at 6:20 a.m.

==== Joe James accused ====
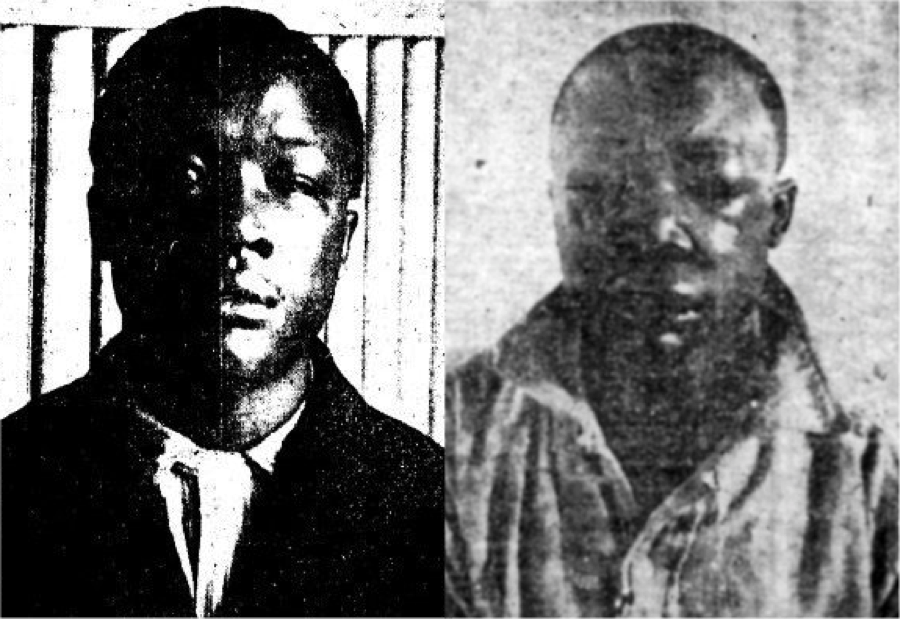
James before July 5 • James after beaten in the streets

James's face was so badly beaten that he was rendered "incapable of speech," and did not "look much like a human being." The police decided to wait until the swelling around his mouth had gone down before "sweating him." Police Chief Morris was confident that he would get a confession from him. James insisted in jail that he could not remember what he had done after midnight Saturday. "I was so drunk I don’t know where I was or what I did," he said. The arresting officer, J. T. Headrick, added that James had nothing in his pockets when he was arrested.

James was said to be identified by Sheriff Deputy, Harry Taylor, who identified the cap, and the piece of torn shirt, as belonging to James. James was also said to have been identified by those who had chased him, members of the Ballard family, and by the bloody "penknife" that Officer Jack Golden, accompanied by Ballard's sons, found after James's arrest. (Note: Attributed to multiple sources:) However, the police verified that James had no weapon on him when he left the prison on the afternoon of July 4.

James was immediately labeled "the murderer." However, newspapers questioned the logic of the reported event, and admitted finding his motives to be "difficult to understand." Robbery had been ruled out because nothing in Ballard's house was "molested," and Ballard's home would not attract a burglar. But with the alleged intrusion occurring in the bedroom of Ballard's daughters, and with James being black while the girls were white, it was assumed that James must have been attempting to rape the girl(s).

Prior to James's arrest, the police thought the assailant, who had robbed a victim of a coat the night before, was probably "the same negro who cut Ballard." Though the victim's description of the assailant did not match the description of James, James became the only suspect after Homer claimed to have found materials of the assailant at their home.

=== Alleged rape of Mabel Hallam ===
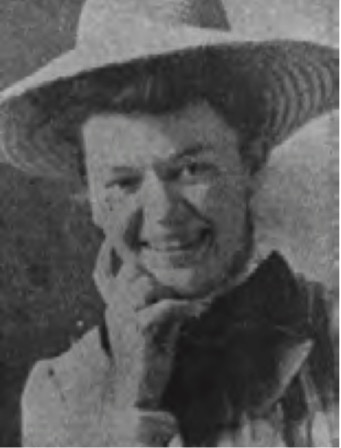
Mabel Hallam, who alleged rape

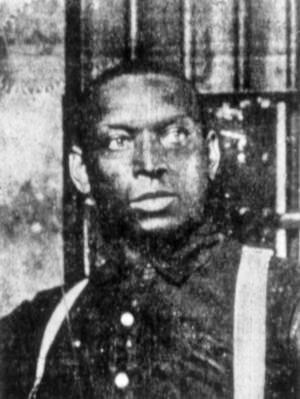
George Richardson, accused of her alleged rape

Mabel Hallam, claimed that on the night of August 12, at her home, a black man cut the screen door to the back door of her home, threatened to kill her, then dragged her, naked, from bed out into her garden, where he raped and beat her unconscious.

George Richardson was working with a group of men when police saw working and assumed that the perpetrator was "probably" among the group. The police took the men, took their clothes (after changing into different clothes) and, delivered them to Hallam's home, where she pointed out Richardson as her attacker. Richardson professed his innocence, maintaining that he was at home with his wife, Maud. Maud validated Richardson's alibi and was committed to testifying in his defense.

However, the police claimed that his coat was torn and they found "a trace of blood" on his coat. This was in line with Hallam's statement that she "tore her assailant's coat." Despite multiple eyewitness account claiming that Richardson was on his porch with his wife at the time of the attack, police arrested Richardson and took him to the county jail, where Hallam hesitantly picked him out of a lineup of potential suspects. She cautioned that she could not be certain if Richardson was her alleged attacker because "all colored men looked alike" to her, telling Richardson. "I believe that you are the man," she said to Richardson, "and you will have to prove that you are not." Richardson was charged with rape and put in a cell with Joe James.

=== August 14 ===
Once Mabel Hallam "positively identified" her attacker, a crowd of about 3,000 white men gathered in downtown Springfield, looking to lynch James and Richardson. The crowd, numbering about 5,000, went to the Sangamon County Jail, surrounded the scaffolding that was being built there for Joe James, and demanded the prisoners be given to them so they could "lynch the niggers!" Around 4:30 p.m., the commander of the Third Division of the Illinois National Guard, was alerted to the conditions around the jail by Captain H. H. Tuttle, an Assistant Surgeon, with the Fourth Infantry. Shand claimed to have alerted Governor Charles Deneen, who directed him to consult with the sheriff of the area, Sheriff Charles Werner. When Shand arrived at the jail, Werner told Shand that sending troops would not be necessary. Shand told Werner that if he rejected Deneen's offer of troops, and a riot broke out, that Werner would be responsible. Werner then requested one pre-cautionary Company be placed at the State Arsenal building. Shand convinced Werner to place two additional companies there.

Werner believed he had the situation under control as he had pre-arranged for firemen to respond to an orchestrated false fire alarm at 5:08 p.m. While people were distracted, watching the firemen, Werner enlisted 49-year-old Harry T. Loper, to drive James and Richardson to McLean County Jail, about 65 miles away, in Bloomington, for their safety. Loper was escorted by Sheriff Deputies Kramer, Hanrahan and Rhodes, and Sergeant of Police, Fred Yanzell. Once they reached Bloomington, James and Richardson were put on a train to Peoria, as Werner feared the mob might go to Bloomington and try to retrieve them. After the crowd learned that Loper had arranged the suspects' transfer, the trickery upset them more. Werner ordered the crowd to disperse.

==== Rioting ====
The frustrated crowd then destroyed Loper's restaurant, and set his automobile, parked in front of the restaurant, on fire. The mob then destroyed "the Levee," and "the Badlands." A lynch mob beaten Scott Burton unconscious before dragging him one block south to Madison and Twelfth streets on Saturday. A clothesline was found and used as a noose around Burton's neck. The mob then stripped him of his clothes, mutilated his body, and tried unsuccessfully to set his body on fire.

On Saturday, another mob smashed the doors and windows of the William Donnegan home. They pulled Donnegan, from the house and beat him. "Have mercy on me, boys, have mercy," Donnegan cried out to the mob. But there was no mercy. Donnegan's throat was slashed with a razor by a mob participant. The mob then tied with a thin clothesline around his neck, and hung him to a small tree in the Edwards School yard near his house. He later died at St. John's Hospital, Sunday morning at 11:30.

== Effects ==
Following the attacks, 10,000 tourists traveled to Springfield to see the aftermath. With the roughly 3,700 militiamen in town, and many black people returning to the city, a food shortage ensued. Business was largely halted for 10 days. News of the attacks spread across the country:

There is a bitter irony in the fact that the largest force of state troops ever assembled in Illinois were summoned by the Governor of Lincoln's state to protect the Negroes whom Lincoln emancipated from citizens of Lincoln's city. It is a sorry comment upon American civilization that no better use has been made of our resources of law, education and religion than to have allowed that population to have become, in large part, so depraved that the new race of white barbarians...trust no means of protecting themselves from them except the blood and fire of extermination. The isolation to which the increasing race antipathy consigns the Negro populations in the cities of the North, East and West, as well as the South, may confidently be reckoned upon to produce, everywhere all the elements, for just a crucifixion of its justice, humanity and religion as the nation has suffered in Springfield.

— Graham Taylor, Charities and the Commons, 1908

=== Injuries and deaths ===
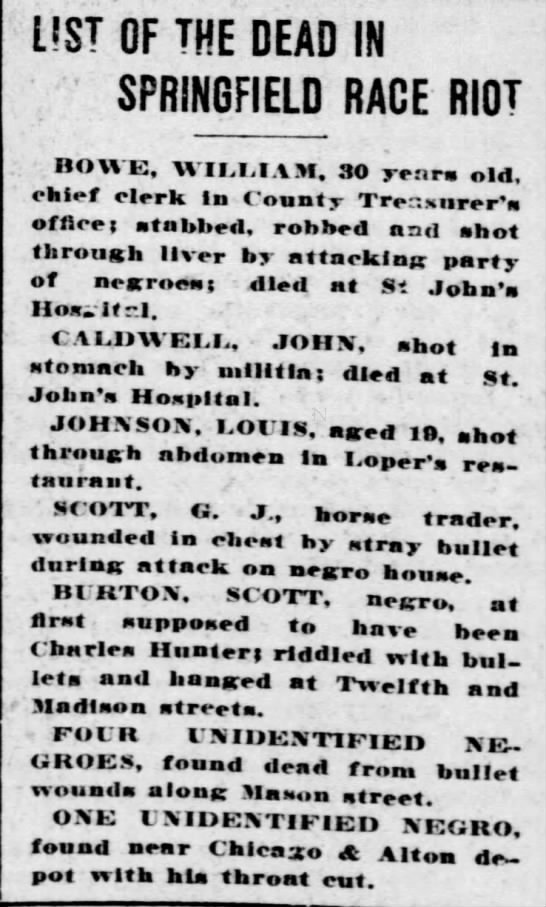
St. Louis Post-Dispatch

Over 100 whites were documented as being injured while participating in the attacks. It is unknown how many black people were injured as many fled, and also due to white city officials and most newspapers, opted not to record the injuries of black people who stayed or returned. For example, in the initial injury list of 62 included 3 black people, and omitted others, such as Charles Duncan, an elderly black man, stricken with rheumatoid arthritis who was shot in the chest by the mob when he tried to flee his home as they surrounded it. Duncan would later sue the city for his injury. Several black people were also pulled from street cars, and places of business where they worked and frequented, such as the Silas hotel and Dreamland Theatre, and beaten in the street. At least one black man is on record of having a nervous breakdown, when the police arrested him and sought to have him committed to a mental hospital, after finding him taking lumber from the lumberyards, stating his determination to "rebuild all the burned homes in the east end."

Seven people were on record as being dead: two Black men and five Whites. However, there were several more unreported deaths, such as Louis Hanen, a white man who was struck in his chest, groin and chin, along with John Colwell, by a volley laid down by the militia near Twelfth and Madison. Hanen did not succumb to his injuries until November.

In addition to Scott Burton and William Donnegan, there were also six unidentified black people killed, four from bullet wounds near Eleventh and Macon Street, one with his throat cut near Chicago and Alton Streets, and one found hanging from a tree on Fifteen and Clay Streets, with his clothes "slashed to shreds" and his body "riddled with bullets." Such black deaths were corroborated when the families, of four of the black men who were killed, sought to bring lawsuits against the city for their deaths, but were denied the right to file.

All five of the white men who were killed – Frank Delmore (killed by a stray bullet), Louis Johnston (shot by mob), James W. Scott (killed by ricochet bullet), John Colwell (shot by militia), and Louis Hanen (shot by militia) – died at the hands of other white mob members, or by the hands of the white state militia. Delmore, a miner, was initially thought to have been an innocent bystander, but the city physician said he overheard him bragging about the riots in the hospital.

"I had the satisfaction of seeing one nigger shot and if I live to get out with the bunch I will see some hung."

A sixth white person, Earl Nelson, was bayonetted to death in Kankakee after he and three other whites attacked militiamen on their way to help suppress the riots. In addition, at least one black infant died from exposure, after her family was made refugees and no neighboring community would allow them in. Some black deaths were unaccounted for because their loved ones buried them at night out of fear that whites might attack them, while the loved ones of other black people transported the bodies of their dead off to the countryside for burial. It was also said that several black people were burned alive in their homes and that, at one point, black people had to send out of town for more caskets as they had run out.

Early after he was shot, William H. Bowe was erroneously reported as being killed by black people. However, he did not die, and continued to live in Springfield until he died 50 years later, in 1958.

=== Refugees ===
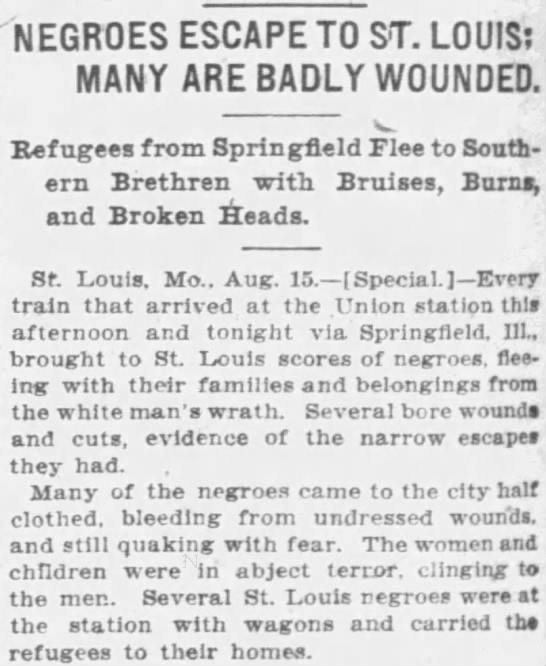

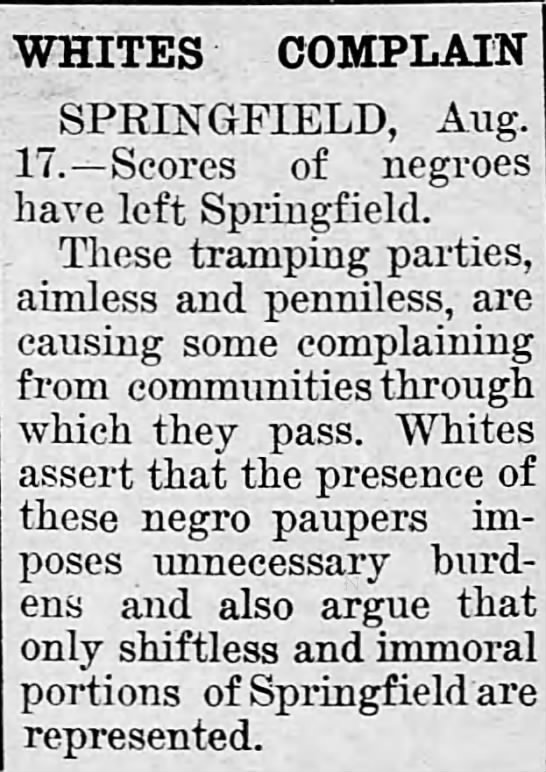

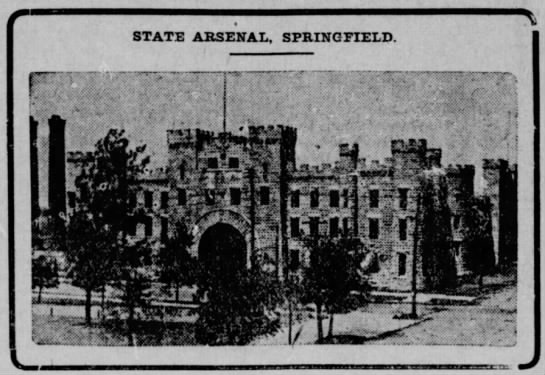
State Arsenal.The Weekly Republican.

Many black people fled Springfield during the attacks. They had to escape on foot and hid in corn fields, sometimes getting onto trains, or pleading for refuge with nearby rural families. Mattie Hale recalled her family took people in:

We sheltered, I guess, above twenty or twenty-five. We had a large barn...and a lot of them went up there and stayed all night in the barn loft. Some slept out underneath of our fruit trees and we'd taken some in the house...And we fed them; we went to the garden and we gathered vegetables and cooked.

Those who returned to Springfield faced increased hostility. For example, when a group of newly homeless and destitute black women returned with their children, at 12:15 p.m., near Pasfield and Cedar streets, the white residents sounded the fire alarm. When the firemen came, the white residents stated they were looking for protection as they were "frightened by the presence" of the women and children. Many black people returning had no personal effects except what they managed to carry with them:

...the next morning...it [the prairies] was just full of niggers. Some of them would have a sheet wrapped around them or a blanket, or some them wouldn't have a damn thing on. They wouldn't have a stitch on...they were coming back into town. They had gotten out of town see, waiting away from the riot. Got out in the sticks and hid in the sticks. Come daylight, they was moving back into town."

— William F. Lee, Loper's Restaurant looter

Governor Deneen arranged for the homeless to take refuge in the State Arsenal, and in tents at Camp Lincoln. Several hundred went to the Arsenal; however, many refused to live there and wanted to leave the city, as they felt unsafe:

For God's sake, mister [Deneen], give me enough money to make myself and child to Missouri. These white folks have sent word to me that they will burn my house and murder me.

— Elderly black woman, August 17, 1908

Many refugees who fled were denied any assistance in neighboring towns, and were turned away with no provisions even after long treks. For example, Buffalo, about 15 miles from Springfield, posted a sign at the train station: "All niggers wanted out of town by Monday, 12 am sharp – BUFFALO SHARP SHOOTERS." Refugees who took trains to Jacksonville, Peoria and Sterling, were met by armed police who prevented them from getting off the train. When black people arrived in Greenridge and begged for food, they were "stoned out of town." In Gage Park, white residents threatened over 40 black refugee families with shotguns, ropes, and lynching should they try to attempt to seek shelter there.

Such rejection brought about more deaths. For example, Lawrence Paine fled Springfield with his wife and three-week-old daughter. After the family was "denied refuge from the elements in the white towns along the route of their march, [the baby] died of exposure."

It is uncertain how many black people permanently left the city due to the attacks. Many newspapers claimed that more 2,000 fled; which might have been likely during the attack and its immediate aftermath. It appears that most black people did return to Springfield, or were replaced by new migrants. Prior to the attacks, Springfield had about 2,700 black people. Two years later, per the 1910 US census, the black population had risen to just under 3,000.

Those who did return, and found that they were rendered homeless, sought refuge at the state Arsenal building, joining the 300 black people who had not left the Arsenal since the attacks began. Some newspapers labeled the returnees as "fugitives." At least 400 black people would live in the Arsenal building in the aftermath of the attacks, and some officials feared that "their very presence" would incite a riot. To prevent such incitement, the militiamen kept the doors to the armory closed, brought the residents food prepared by militia cooks, and discouraged them from leaving the building.

=== Personal and property damages ===
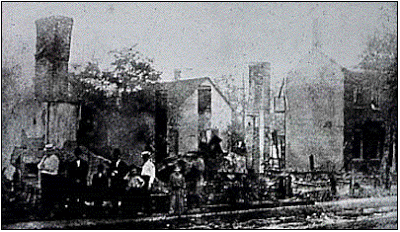
Ruins of "The Badlands"

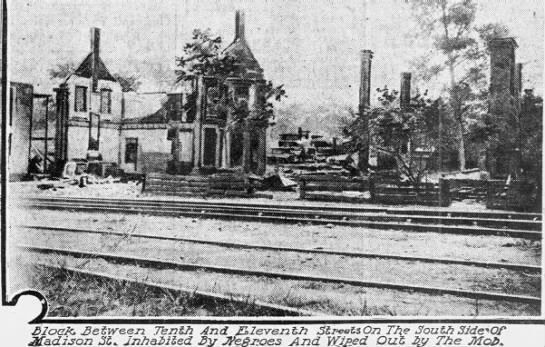
Block of building ruins between 10th and 11th Streets south side of Madison Street in "The Badlands" after riot. Chicago Tribune.

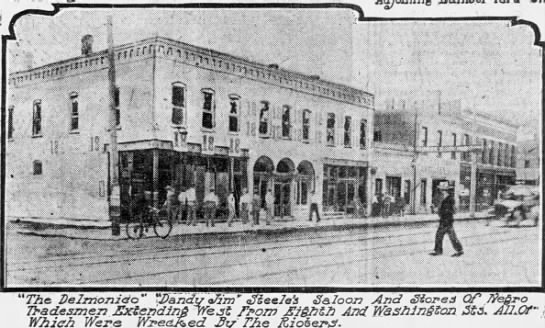
Dandy Jim's after attacks.

The militia quelled the riot on August 15, with nearly 50 homes and 35 businesses left in ruins. It was reported that "violent explosions and winds could not have accomplished more destruction. The negro quarters over these places were emptied and every window was shot out":

Can't you give me a ticket to Bloomington? I've got a son up there, and [I'm] sure he will give me a home. I can't see why they treat me as if I was a dog. Here I is, 76-years-old next week. Me and my girl saved up $300 and put it all in a home. Now our home is done burned up, and we're without a place to sleep, let alone enough to wear."

— Black Woman, Resident of "The Badlands," Aug. 22, 1908

Within one week, pictures of the burned ruins were sold as postcards and other memorabilia.

There was over $120,000 in property damage "by fire," and over $35,000 filed in personal damages. Adjusted for inflation, in 2024, the total amount equates to about $5 million. However, not included in those estimates was property damage due to vandalism. With costs to transport and feed the state militia, during the violence, the total cost to the state was $265,000.

The family of Scott Barton sued the city for $5,000 (roughly $125,000 in 2018), as did the family of William Donnegan. The families of four other black people who were killed, were denied the right to file suits, as the city attributed the cause of their deaths, not to the attacks, but to an uncontrollable force majeure.

As lawsuits began mounting up against the city, it refused to pay anything. The city shifted the blame for the attacks and failure to protect its citizens to the state. Springfield filed a lawsuit against the state claiming that the militia failed to stop the attacks as it lacked ammunition supplies, was forbidden from charging into the mob, and that the damages that happened in Springfield occurred after the state took charge the situation.

The city ended up denying payment to all claimants seeking damages, with exception to the families of Burton and Donnegan, citing Section 5 of the Illinois Criminal Code, "Suppression of Mob Violence":

The surviving spouse, lineal heirs, or adopted children of any such other person or persons who, before the loss of life, were dependent for support upon any other person who shall hereafter suffer death by lynching at the hands of a mob, in any county or city of this State, may recover from such county or city damages for injury sustained by reason of the loss of life of such person, to a sum not exceeding five thousand dollars.

Ballard's wife, and two minor daughters, filed what was described by a local paper as "one of the most peculiar suits ever filed" at the time. Under the Dram Shop Act, they filed a $10,000 (about $250,000 in 2018) suit against Edward White and James Smith, the owners of Dandy Jim's saloon, where Joe James had been drinking, and also against Jacob B. Olean, who owned the building where Dandy Jim's operated. As one of the first civil suits of its kind, the case was "watched with great interest by the legal profession." The family alleged that the three men cited were liable for Clergy Ballard's death because they served James alcohol. They said that if the men had not served James alcohol, he would not have become drunk and would not have allegedly killed Ballard.

=== Racial atmosphere ===
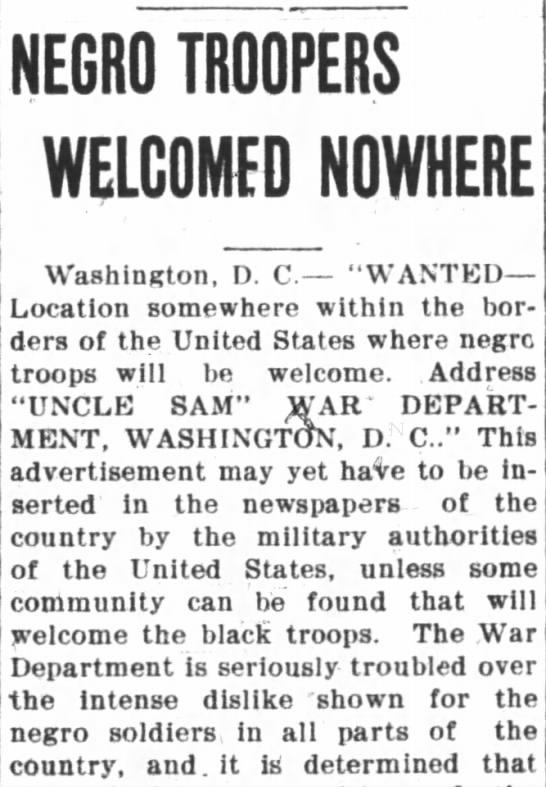
Republican-Northwestern. (Belvidere, Illinois) October 8, 1907

Newspapers were filled with reports of hostility and violence against black people. For example, the same day the Springfield riot began, in Pensacola, Florida, "large crowds" were reported waiting outside the jailhouse with "excitement" to lynch a black man accused of assaulting a white woman. That same night, in Media, Pennsylvania, a black man died by suicide rather than let himself be captured by a mob hunting him for, allegedly, threatening a white woman. And, at 1:00 a.m. on August 15, a mob of 300 men showed up at the Norfolk, Virginia county jail, planning to lynch two black men accused of "criminally assaulting" a white woman. By December 1908, some 88 lynchings had been recorded that year across the country; black people were 95 percent of the victims.

Springfield, with its thriving vice district, also had a history of violence prior to the attacks. Immediately after Ballard's death, newspapers added his death "to the long list of bloody murders which have stained the history of Springfield. For example, on the day James first appeared before the special grand jury, his case was one of two murder cases brought to them. The other case was one of whites killing a white: Ira Dudley and Michael Lynch, a white livery driver and white miner, were both charged with the July 2 murder of Marcus Neil, when they allegedly hit him over the head with a club and fractured his skull.

Such violence continued in the aftermath of the riot, further heightening tensions. On August 23, one week after the riot, Thomas Brady, a 70-year-old white man, was murdered in his sleep at his store on East Washington Street, where the riot had been intense. Although Grady's 26-year-old white employee, Frank Bryant, was guilty of the crime, prior to his capture, rumors circulated that Grady had been murdered by a black man. The black population feared becoming targets again of whites on no evidence.

The riot violence spread beyond Springfield: whites in surrounding states arbitrarily attacked black people in their towns. For example, on August 16, a black man, George Mondie, was walking in Evansville, Indiana, when he passed two white men discussing the riot in Springfield. When the men saw Mondie, they attacked him and nearly stabbed him to death.

==== Support for attackers ====
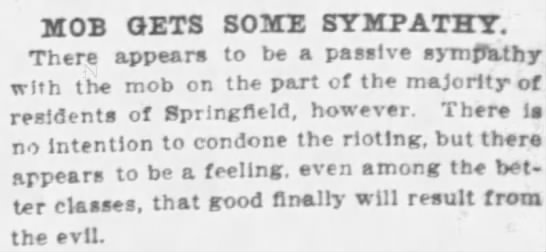
Chicago Tribune. August 1908

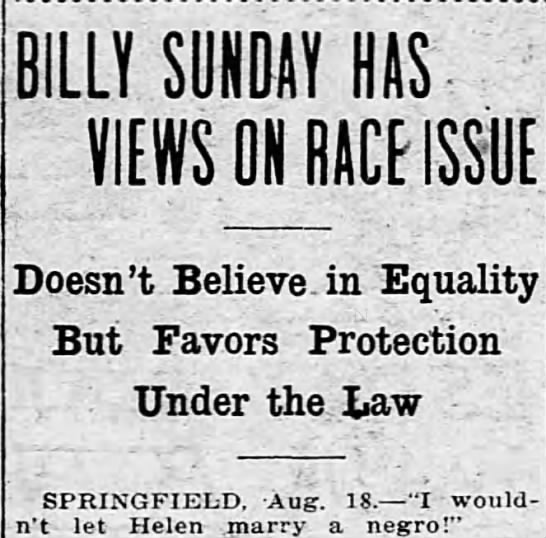
Decatur Herald. 1908-08-19

The whites of Springfield largely came to support the riot, and eventually showed sympathy for the attackers. Whites talked about how "everybody knows that mob has made our families safe," boasting that the attacks were "the best thing that ever happened to the Capital City," and celebrating that "this was only the beginning of a crusade that shall make Springfield decent and keep it that way":

..."Springfield had no shame. She stood for the action of the mob. She hoped the rest of the negroes might flee. She threatened that the movement to drive them out would continue. I do not speak of the leading citizens, but of the masses of people, of working men in the shops, the storekeepers in the stores, the drivers, the men on the street, the wounded in the hospitals...

— William English Walling, September 3, 1908

Two weeks after Ballard died, the Illinois State Journal began running a comic strip: "Sambo and His Funny Voices." The comic relegated black people to bumbling stereotypes, allowing whites to ridicule and diminish black citizens. Black people were harassed and assaulted for several weeks after the affair.

The Springfield community had primarily blamed black people for the violence, or blamed both sides:

The colored people are themselves partly to blame for rioting themselves, although the blame in and rebellion, all these is shared by the whites.

— Reverend E. E. Frame, Plymouth Congregational Church

Sin is at the bottom of it all. This murder of Ballard, and the assault of last Thursday, are simply outcroppings of an evil nature. – The Reverend Billy Sunday

The implication is clear that the conditions, not the populace, were to blame and that many good citizens could find no other remedy than that applied by the mob. It was not the fact of the whites' hatred toward the negroes, but of the negroes' own misconduct, general inferiority or unfitness for free institutions that were at fault.

— Illinois State Journal, Editorial

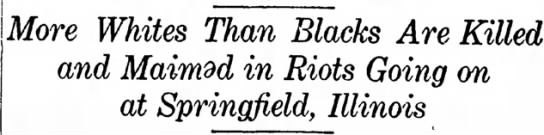
Nevada State Journal. 1908-08-16.

Such sympathy factored into the narrative of the attacks, minimizing the role of whites. For example, following the attacks, newspapers began erroneously reporting that white deaths had outnumbered the deaths of black people. The only deaths of black people reported were the deaths of prominent men of Springfield (e.g. Burton, Donnegan). This false claim, which suggested that black people had killed the whites who died, and that the attacks were mutual in nature, was reported as fact for over 100 years.

==== Economic effects ====
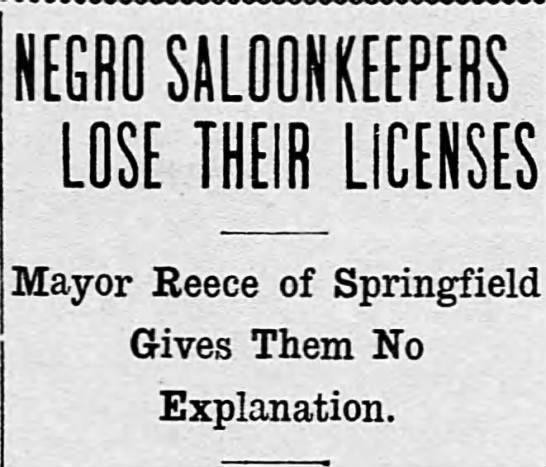
Decatur Herald. September 2, 1908

Following the attacks, Mayor Reece nullified, without explanation, the saloon licenses of six of Springfield's black-owned saloons, forcing their owners and employees to find new sources of income. This also meant that black people were abruptly deprived of casual neighborhood gathering places. Lee F. Osborne, a black saloon owner, could not acquire a license for four months; the city approved it only after he obtained the backing of a black "law and order" league, led by a pastor, and promised to run "a model saloon."

Black municipal workers – recognized as "faithful, honest men of long service" – lost their jobs. Mayor Reese laid off all black firemen "for the good of the service," and all black policemen, who he said would no longer be "useful" in their jobs. Reese thought that getting rid of black workers would avoid "trouble" with whites and reduce post-riot tensions. In addition, Mayor Reece received "Black Hand" letters telling him to fire them or face more violence.

Black laborers were also threatened with job loss. For example, three coal mines, including Woodside and Tuxhorn, employed approximately 500 men, of which 30 percent were black. Following the attacks, the 350 white miners went to the president of the Springfield United Mine Workers union, refusing to work with black miners, stating that they felt "unsafe" working with black people underground. The mines shut down for several days, only re-opening when mine executives threatened to bring in black strikebreakers if the white miners did not resume work. Several other white employers also received letters in the mail, threatening their lives and property, if they did not dismiss their black employees or if they did business with black people.

Because merchants refused to deliver provisions to black people at Camp Lincoln, hesitated to serve black people in town, or overcharged them when they did, the state purchased $10,000 (over $250,000 in 2018) worth of groceries to re-sell to black people so they could have food.

==== Social and political effects ====
White men immediately galvanized around the notion of restricting black people from voting. From 1890 to 1908 legislatures of southern states had passed new constitutions and laws that raised barriers to voter registration, effectively disenfranchising most black people and excluding them from politics. This policy was enforced for decades, into the late 1960s.

Local discussions were similarly overt in intent:

The male citizen of the black belt in late years has come to pose as a political factor in Springfield. Do you want niggers to make white mans' laws? If not, get busy. Have all the men who have made our laws for the past thirty years been elected by the intelligent white vote or by the majority of an ignorant, vicious Negro vote?

— Springfield News, August 17, 1908

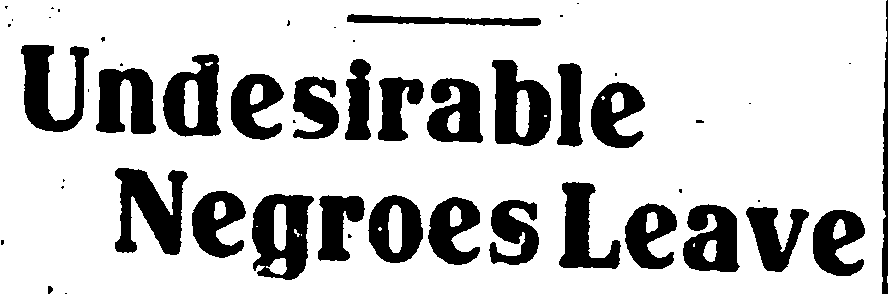
Illinois State Register

Directed to arrest "all suspicious characters," police quickly began arresting black people known to have lost their jobs, or homes in the riot, for "vagrancy"; in some cases police conducted raids of their homes to do so. If unable to pay a $100 ($2,500 in 2018) fine, the black people were given "hours" to leave town. Most of those arrested lived, or had businesses in, the politically influential Levee District. For example, seven such arrests were made in one day, one week after the rioting. The following week, police raided the homes of nine more black people, arrested them for "vagrancy," and presented them with the same ultimatum to leave.

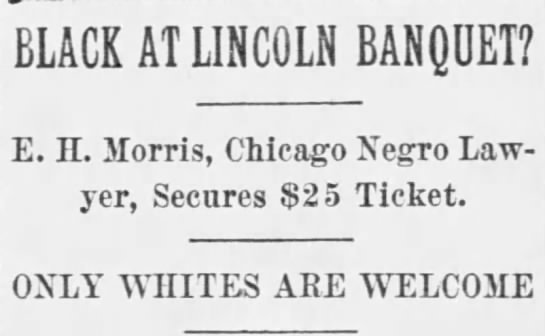
Chicago Tribune. Feb 1909.

Six months later, the city held a Centennial Celebration in honor of Lincoln's birthday. It was a "black tie" event held at the State Arsenal Building, featuring prominent American and foreign dignitaries. It was held at the same place used to shelter 300 black people during the riots. More than 700 whites attended the $25 ($650 in 2018) per plate event. No African American was invited, although many black people wanted to celebrate Lincoln and his emancipation of slaves. Edward H. Morris, a prominent Chicago black lawyer, did purchase a ticket to the event. When organizers learned that he was black, his ticket was rescinded.

It was reported that black people were thoroughly "over the fact that they [are] deprived in the big doings" around Springfield, and stipulated that, from this point out, the social order of the city had changed:

The colored population hereabouts will be represented only by the gents who slip the soup [to the white guests].

== Indictments ==
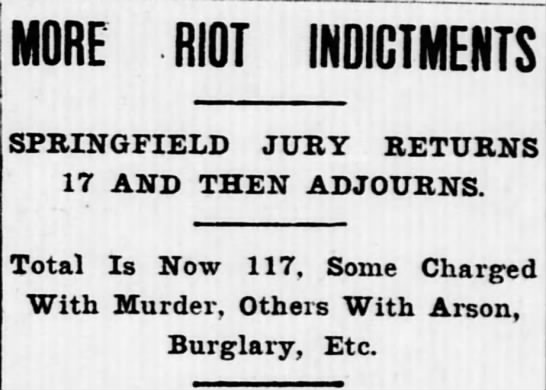
Evening Star. September 4, 1908

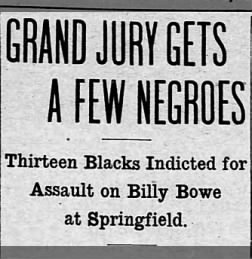
Decatur Herald. August 1908

By August 17, over 200 people had been arrested in connection with the attacks. The State Attorney General, Frank L. Hatch, said that he had evidence to charge "at least 15 people" with murder. Hatch filed a motion for a special jury.

On the morning of August 17, because the jails were overflowing, Judge James A. Creighton, granted the special jury to move the process along. Creighton asked Sheriff Werner how quickly he could get 23 men together. Werner responded that he could corral men by 2:00 p.m. that afternoon. Creighton set the jury investigations to begin at that time, and ordered that the investigations be conducted in secret. At 2:00 p.m., Werner returned to the courthouse with the same 23 men who constituted the special grand jury that indicted Joe James four weeks prior.

By early September, the grand jury, "seeking to place blame for the deaths and the destruction of property", brought 117 indictments against dozens of individuals. In late October, the grand jury brought an additional 32 indictments against mob participants for "malicious mischief," bringing the total of indictments to 149.

Four of the indictments were against police officers – Oscar Dahlcamp, Joseph Fernanmes, George Pohlman and George W. Dawson – for "grossly neglecting any efforts to suppress the riot."

The special grand jury said of the police:

After the most diligent inquiry we condemn, in unmeasured terms the cowardly, contemptuous actions of those members of the police force, who having taken the oath of office, failed to do their duty; men who are paid from money obtained from the pockets of the people of this city to protect life and property; men who were ordered by the heads of departments of the police to go out and disperse the mob and who not only failed to use a club, handle a pistol or raise a voice against the mob on the side of the law and order, but some who are show to have assisted by act and word in doing the work that has brought the blush-shame to every law-abiding citizen of this city.

Approximately 10 percent of the indictments were against black men, who were charged with crimes such as "assault with a deadly weapon," "assault to intent to murder," "or "robbery." Most white men were charged with lesser charges of "mischief," "riot," or "larceny." For example, Andrew J. Gordon, a black former St. Louis detective who then resided in Springfield, and who local whites referred to as "Big Nigger Gordon," was indicted for the attempted murder and robbery of William H. Bowe. Gordon denied the charges. Former detective Gordon ended up working as a janitor the following year, according to the city directory.

Most of the black men arrested for Bowe's shooting were known to be politically influential "among colored voters." They were held in jail on bench warrants, from August 14 until November 3, past voter registration day in the city. Because they were in jail, they were prevented from registering. But on November 2, some of the black men were released, if they could post a $1,000 bond, "with the understanding that they were to boost for [Fred] Mortimer," who was running for "the most important county office," State Attorney, in an election taking place the following day.

=== Kate Howard ===
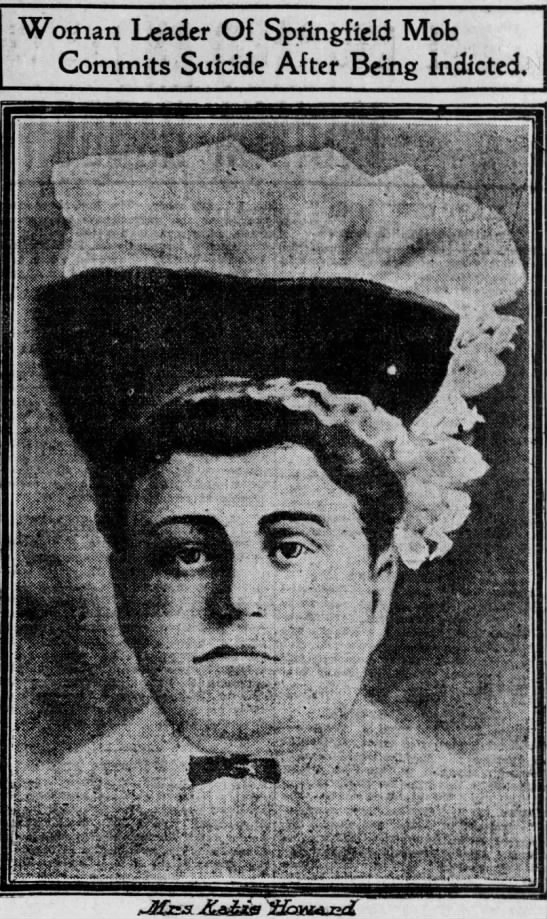
Kate Howard

Kate Howard, who had incited the violence on Loper's property, and the lynchings of Burton and Donnegan, was the first attacker to be indicted. A charge was brought against her for the murder of Burton. Nicknamed "Springfield Joan," an homage to "Joan of Arc," Howard was seen throwing bricks at, and stealing a substantial amount of silverware and linen, from Loper's restaurant, which she looted for her hotel. It was reported that, at Burton's lynching, she "behaved like a fury of the French Revolution."

In an interview, Howard said her actions were inspired by observations during a trip she had taken to the South with her brother. While in Texas and Arkansas, she saw how stringently whites enforced segregation (which their legislatures had passed into law), and thought it worked to "teach the negro where he belonged." When she returned to Springfield, she noticed more businesses boycotting black people, but thought they were being cowardly in enforcing it. She thought it was time for the city's whites to "act up" and take action that she was willing to steer. After the attacks, she proudly displayed buckshot wounds in her arms, which were rumored to have been inflicted during Burton's lynching. She said that she believed white citizens would not allow her to be punished.

However, when arrested and facing 10 indictments, Howard said that she was not guilty. She said she had gone into Loper's only to collect souvenirs of the attack. One of her souvenirs was a 20-pound bucket of lard.

After Howard was indicted, a white saloonkeeper posted her a $10,000 bond (over $250,000 in 2018). When Deputy Sheriff Kramer arrived at her home to arrest her on the murder charge, she excused herself to "change her clothes." Upon stepping away, she secretly swallowed arsenic, then allowed Deputy Kramer to place her under arrest, telling him: "I'm ready to go." By the time they reached the jail, Howard collapsed and died as she walked through the door.

=== Persons indicted ===
Name	Occupation	Indictment(s)
Frank Whitico	Bartender	Arson
William "Fuzzy" Phillips	Former Police Officer	Arson; Riot
Roy E. Young	Hostler	Arson; Burglary; Larceny
Abraham Raymer	Peddler	Arson; Destruction of Property (2 counts); Larceny; Malicious Mischief (5 counts); Murder (2 counts); Riot
William Farmer (black)	Carpet Cleaning Manager	Assault with Intent to Murder; Assault with a Deadly Weapon; Assault and Battery; Robbery
Frank C. Mitchell (black)	Laborer	Assault with Intent to Murder; Assault with a Deadly Weapon; Assault and Battery; Robbery
William Beaverly (black)	Unknown	Assault with Intent to Murder; Assault with a Deadly Weapon; Assault and Battery
Chas Cade (black)	Unknown	Assault with Intent to Murder; Assault with a Deadly Weapon; Assault and Battery
Sandy Curry (black)	Unknown	Assault with Intent to Murder; Assault with a Deadly Weapon; Assault and Battery
Andrew J. Gordon (black)	Shoemaker, Former Detective	Assault with Intent to Murder; Assault with a Deadly Weapon; Assault and Battery
Haden "Hade" L. Gray (black)	Laborer	Assault with Intent to Murder; Assault with a Deadly Weapon; Assault and Battery
Thomas Marshall (black)	Miner	Assault with Intent to Murder; Assault with a Deadly Weapon; Assault and Battery
Frank Meredith (black)	Laborer	Assault with Intent to Murder; Assault with a Deadly Weapon; Assault and Battery
James Porter (black)	Unknown	Assault with Intent to Murder; Assault with a Deadly Weapon; Assault and Battery
5 Unknown Men (black)	Unknown	Assault with Intent to Murder; Assault with a Deadly Weapon; Assault and Battery
Robert McCay	Unknown	Burglary
Sydney Adwell	Unknown	Burglary; Larceny
May Beck	Unknown	Burglary; Larceny
William Bender	Unknown	Burglary; Larceny
Georgia Benning	Unknown	Burglary; Larceny
Eugene Bradley	Barber	Burglary; Larceny
Madge Clark	Unknown	Burglary; Larceny
William Lotherington	Unknown	Burglary; Larceny
Alta McNeeley	Unknown	Burglary; Larceny
Frederick Mehl	Miner	Burglary; Larceny
Grover C. McCauley	Barber	Burglary; Larceny
Leo Randolph	Unknown	Burglary; Larceny
Joseph Rose	Peddler	Burglary; Larceny
Mabel South	Unknown	Burglary; Larceny
William Smith	Unknown	Burglary; Larceny
Mabel Stout	Unknown	Burglary; Larceny
William Stout	Unknown	Burglary; Larceny
Eva Thomas	Clothing Alterations	Burglary; Larceny
Katherine "Kate" Howard	Boarding Proprietor	Destruction of Property (2 counts); Malicious Mischief (2 counts); Murder; Riot (4 counts)
Oscar Dahlcamp*	Police Officer	Gross Neglect to Suppress a Riot
Joseph Fernandes*	Police Officer	Gross Neglect to Suppress a Riot
George Poehlman*	Police Officer	Gross Neglect to Suppress a Riot
George W. Dawson*	Police Officer	Gross Neglect to Suppress a Riot
Ernest "Slim" Humphrey	Huckster	Malicious Mischief (8 counts), Murder, Riot
Rudolph Bredemeyer	Mechanic	Malicious Mischief (6 counts); Riot
John W. Schienle	Electrician	Malicious Mischief (6 counts); Riot
Thomas W. Gegan	Bartender	Malicious Mischief (5 counts); Riot
Herbert B. Carey	Blacksmith	Malicious Mischief (2 counts), Riot
William E. Sutton	Cabman	Malicious Mischief, Riot
Ethel Howe	Cook	Malicious Mischief (4 counts)
Charles Wolff	Unknown	Malicious Mischief (2 counts), Riot
Alvin D. Irwin	Contractor	Malicious Mischief (3 counts)
Edward Ferris	Unknown	Malicious Mischief (3 counts)
Frank Johnson	Travel Agent	Malicious Mischief (2 counts)
George White	Laborer	Malicious Mischief (2 counts)
Peter Sappington	Laborer	Malicious Mischief (3 counts)
Ollie Adams	Laborer	Riot
James Andrew Bechtel	Collections	Riot
Henry F. Collins	Unemployed Bricklayer	Riot
Allen Cox	Unemployed	Riot
Ed Duffy	Unknown	Riot
Roy Foster	Unemployed Fireman	Riot
Benjamin F. Kirlin	Peddler	Riot
B. Klinow	Laborer	Riot
Jesse L. McBee	Railroad Employee	Riot
Fergus O'Toole	Bartender	Riot
Thomas Reavely	Miner	Riot
George Rittenbusch	Laborer	Riot
Sherman A. Stricklett	Railroad Employee	Riot
Edward Sullivan	Miner	Riot
Nicholas Trainor	Painter	Riot
William Sutton	Unknown	Riot
Fred Wilhite	Telephone Company Collector	Riot

=== Conviction ===
==== Abraham Raymer ====
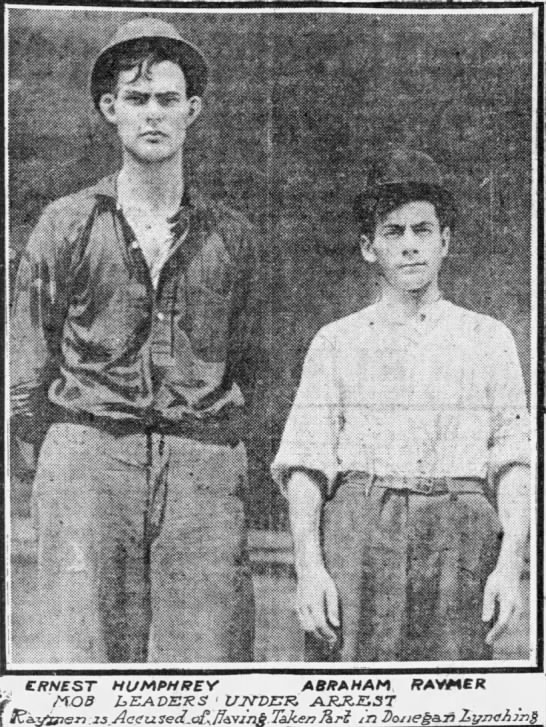
Ernest "Slim" Humphrey (l) and Abraham "Abe" Raymer (r).Chicago Tribune.

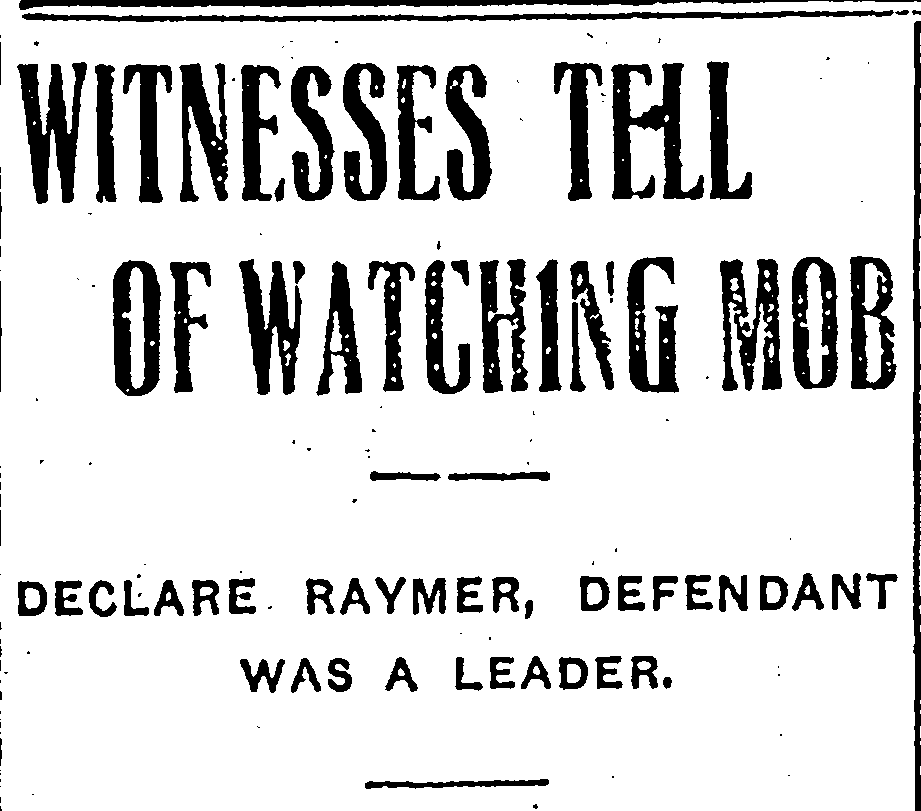
Illinois State Journal

As the trials began, it was widely reported that "few men of any prominence will be hit in the investigation." However, given the numbers of indictments, the scope of evidence (including confessions), and the Grand Jury's "determination to rid the community of the lawless element," newspapers reported that it was likely that perpetrators would serve time:

We have practically a complete confession from Raymer, and we have also discovered convincing evidence of arson on the part of a former police officer of Springfield. The evidence...is of such a character that convictions are almost bound to follow its presentation in court. I will stand sponsor for that statement.

— Lt. Colonel Chipperfield, 1st Calvary

Only one conviction was made by the jury.

Abraham Raymer, a 20-year-old Russian-Jewish vegetable peddler, who spoke in broken English was indicted on 10 charges. Raymer had immigrated in 1903. He had two sisters in Boston, and his mother was in Russia. He came to Springfield, from St. Louis, where he had been employed at a shoe factory, a cleaning store, and an amusement park. He had arrived in Springfield in February. It was rumored, and reported, that Raymer carried the American flag in the middle of the mob and urged them to attack Donnegan, that he personally slit Donnegan's throat, and that he tried to incite the mob to help him beat the detective, Evan T. Jones, who eventually arrested him. Though Raymer was not a legal citizen of the U.S., it was reported that he "loved the flag." He was arrested at the corner of Fourth and Washington streets, about an hour after Donnegan had been lynched. He was with a mob en route to the gashouse, "looking for negroes living there" in order to lynch them. The mob was thwarted by the state militia.

Several witnesses, including at least five militiamen, testified that they saw Raymer throwing bricks into Loper's restaurant. Loper testified that Raymer was a leader in the destruction of his restaurant. Loper said that he watched Raymer destroy his restaurant for over an hour, and considered shooting him, but did not want to miss and accidentally shoot an innocent person in the crowd.

Raymer was reported as "defiant and boastful" about taking part in the mob; he confessed going to the gashouse, and also confessed to taking part in Donnegan's lynching, admitting that Donnegan was targeted because his wife was white. Raymer provided the names of four other rioters, including Ernest "Slim" Humphrey, who had a long rap sheet for fighting.

According to Raymer's confession, on August 15, after leaving the State Arsenal building, a smaller mob of about 200 men assembled at Seventh and Washington streets, around 8:00pm. The headquarters of the militia was one block away, at Seventh and Jefferson. Raymer stated that only about six men in the mob knew where the group was heading. One man allegedly had a clothesline, which he showed to Raymer, who admitted that he understood its intended use. As the mob neared Donnegan's home, Donnegan's wife and children were seen fleeing through a rear door. Five or six members of the mob ran into Donnegan's home, firing revolvers. They dragged Donnegan out. While witnesses said they thought Raymer cut Donnegan's throat, police believed Raymer had tied the rope around Donnegan's neck. Raymer denied doing either.

It was reported that Raymer was one of the "foremost" perpetrators in Burton's lynching as well. He was seen by detectives who knew him, and threatened to arrest him if he did not go home. He had given "a lot of conflicting statements", Authorities suspected him of being an anarchist, which he denied:

No, I am not an anarchist...Someone has said that I slashed Donnegan's neck. I do not remember it, if I did.

While in jail, Raymer was caught hiding a letter, in his shoe, that he wrote (in Yiddish) to S. Singer, a "second hand dealer." Raymer had often stayed with and was living with Singer at the time of the attacks. Raymer was asking Singer for help, as he was certain he was going to be found guilty and hanged:

S. Singer, 110 South Seventh Street, Springfield – Dear and Best Friend: As you love your children, please do something for me. I am locked up at the police station and they are going to hang me for being with the crowd that killed the old negro last night. I want you to try to do your best for me. Please come over and see me.

— A. Raymer

It was later discovered that there was no "S. Singer". Eli Singer, a Russia-born shoe repairman, and his 22-year-old son, Harry Singer, lived and worked at the 110 South Seventh Street address. When police approached Singer about the note, he said he was a "slight acquaintance" of Raymer's.

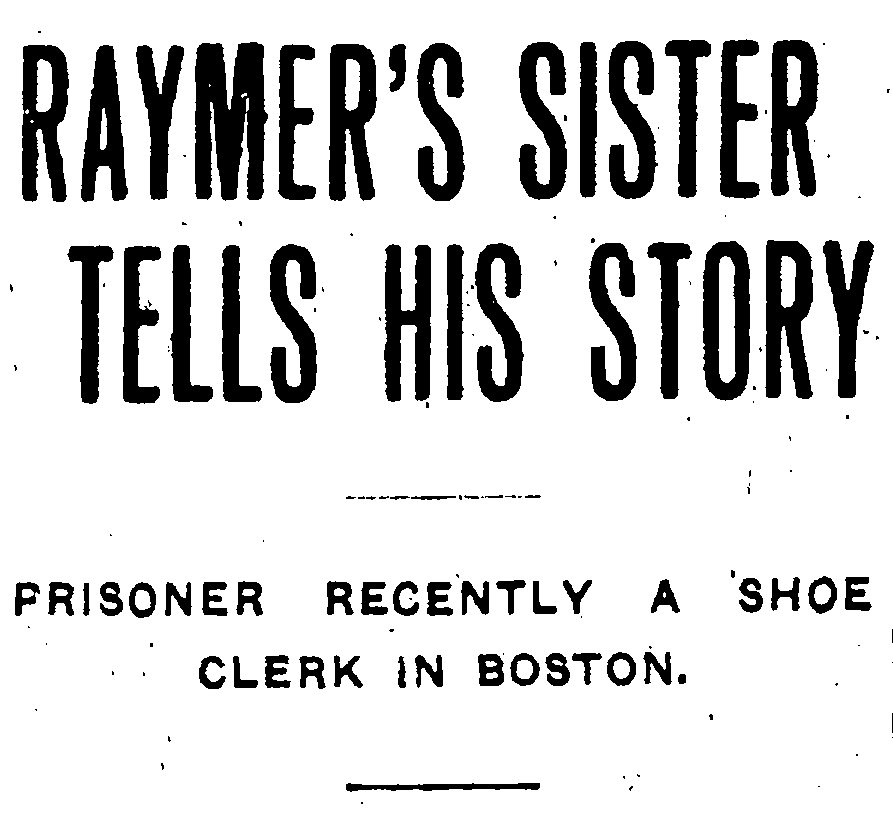
Illinois State Register

Raymer's indictment was the first to be brought before a jury. His trial was closely watched, as it was expected to establish the likelihood of convictions in the other indictments. The Springfield Jewish community raised a fund for Raymer's defense. His sister, Rosa Albert, came from Boston to be at the trial and serve as a character witness. While she was in Springfield, Albert stayed with Eli Singer.

Raymer's trial for Donnegan's murder had been paused by the judge, who determined that it was "impossible" for any of the attackers to receive a fair trial. The initial jury was purged, and a new jury was assembled of prominent businessmen in the community.

Several people admitted to seeing Raymer bend down over Donnegan in the street, and stand back up with blood on his hand, stating their belief that Raymer had slit Donnegan's throat. Others, did not name Raymer but described someone who looked like him: "a short fellow with sleeves rolled up, who talked in broken English, and a 'Jewish' accent."

When Raymer confessed, he insisted that he was not "first leader" of the mob nor had cut Donnegan's throat, attributing that to a man named "Red" Davenport. However, Davenport was never found, and neither known by anyone in Springfield, nor mentioned beyond Raymer's confession. It was reported that Raymer likely "imagined the identity of his companions to escape further experience in 'third degrees.'"

Sarah Donnegan, William's wife, was a key witness for the state. She testified that Raymer was one of the men who dragged her husband from the house. She knew Raymer from his broken English and because he had previously sold her vegetables. Raymer's lawyers, John G. Friedmeyer and Stephen H. Cummins, who was threatened with disbarment by Judge Creighton for his treatment of witnesses, attacked Donnegan's credibility, based on her being in an interracial marriage. They said:

What do you think of this woman – a white woman – marrying a negro forty years older than herself, when she herself was in the bloom of youth? I tell you she started out wrong and she has been erratic ever since.

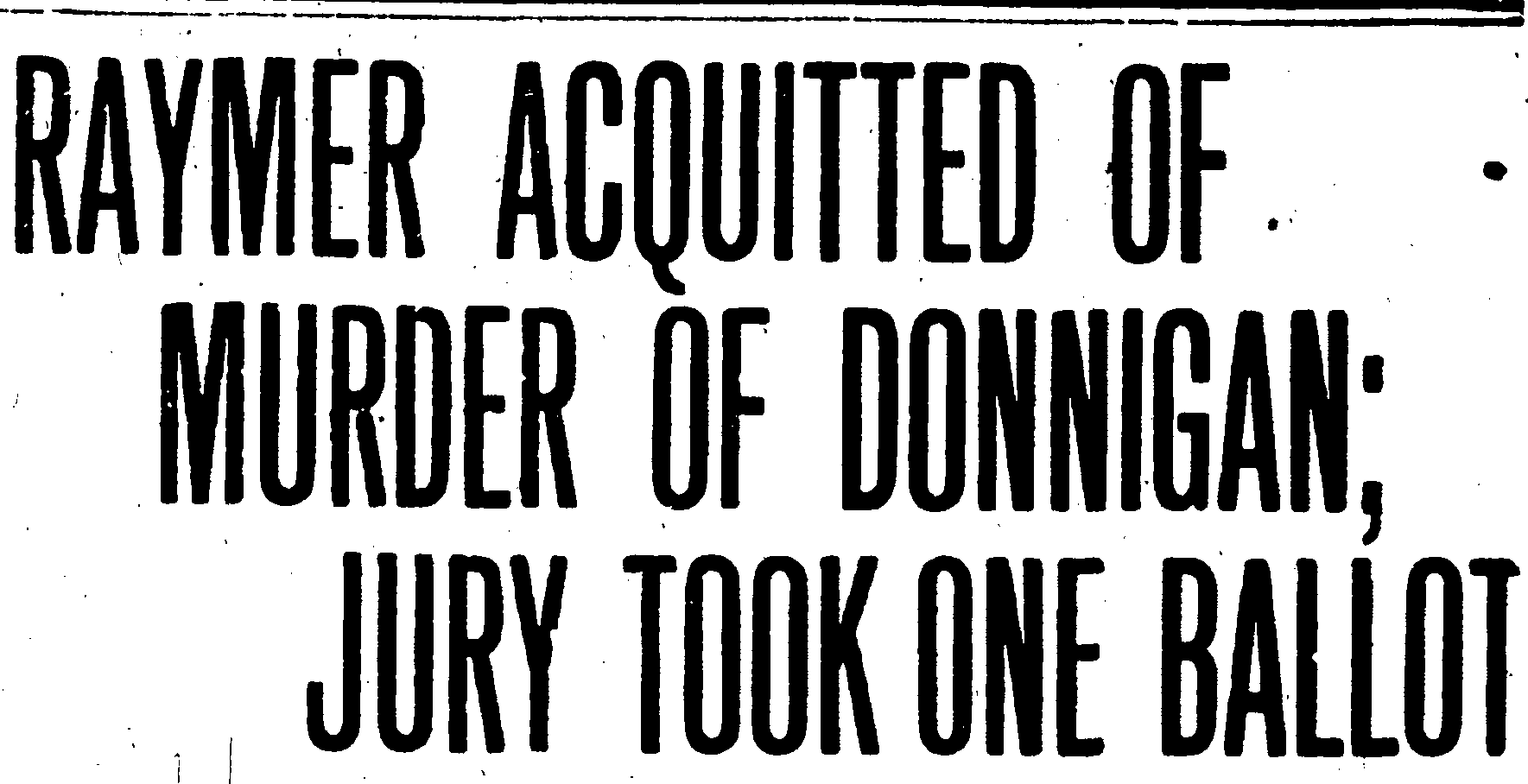
Illinois State Register

The court instructed the jury to convict Raymer of murder if the evidence demonstrated that he was even a part of the lynch mob. But the all-male jury found Raymer "not guilty" on the first ballot. He was acquitted because the jury believed the defense claim of police brutality, saying that his confession was "sweated out" of him by police. After the verdict was read, Raymer shook the hand of each juror and made a speech thanking them.

Raymer was then tried on lesser counts. During the new trial, one of the state's chief witnesses against Raymer, Rollin T. Sturgis, was found dead. A former employee of Harry Loper, he was left injured after the attacks and had filed a $5,000 claim against the city for his injuries. He allegedly shot and killed himself the day before he was to receive a subpoena to testify against Raymer. Sturgis was expected to testify that he had seen Raymer cut Donnegan's throat. It was reported that Sturgis took his own life rather than face questioning for reportedly forging a $31 check to get supplies to move his wife and 1-year-old son. The bullet that killed Sturgis had "entered the back portion" of his head.

Eventually, Raymer was convicted of petty larceny for stealing a saber from the home of Major Otis Duncan, a black militiaman, when the home was looted and burned. He was sentenced to 30 days in jail and a $25 fine (about $650 in 2018). Raymer's acquittal of murder, despite the evidence and instruction by the court, was taken to mean that convictions would not be obtained in the remaining trials.

Raymer was able to get his murder charge for the lynching of Burton, along with three malicious mischief indictments, stricken from the circuit docket by posting a $3,000 bond (about $75,000 in 2018). On February 11, 1909, a local junk dealer, Abraham Barker, put the money up on Raymer's behalf.

Assistant State Attorney, William St. John Wines, said of Raymer's murder acquittals:

If there ever was a man in Sangamon County who deserves to hang, it is Abraham Raymer.

Following his acquittals, Raymer moved to Boston to live near his sisters. He married there, had two sons and became a naturalized citizen of the United States in 1915.

==== Other confessions ====
There were other culprits who outright confessed; yet, despite their confessions, there were no convictions. For example, Charles Gadwin confessed to taking part in Donnegan's lynching. He went to the Bartonville Mental Asylum, applied for shelter, and after he was admitted, promptly confessed:

We stamped him in the face; we cut his throat; and then put a rope around his neck. That's what it took to kill him.

There were also assailants who, not only "proudly" confessed, but who were also found with evidence in their possession to corroborate their confessions. Such was the case with Charlie Wolff, who professed, "I helped to lynch one nigger, anyway..." and 15-year-old Roy E. Young:

When I heard they were shooting niggers I went over. When the niggers commenced shooting on East Washington Street, some of us broke into Fishman's pawnshop to get some guns. I took three or four revolvers and some cartridges and some of the other fellows got some guns too. We went east on Washington Street and the fighting got bad. I commenced shooting at the niggers. I shot every one I had the chance...When we went over to Madison Street someone started setting fires to the houses of niggers and I helped. I guess I poured oil on about fifteen or sixteen houses and set fire to them. I didn't set fire to Burton's bed, nor did I help hang him to the tree. When we got to Ninth and Madison Streets I was just setting fire to a house when a white man ran up to me and told me not to burn the place; that it belonged to him and was rented to niggers. We did not burn this house.

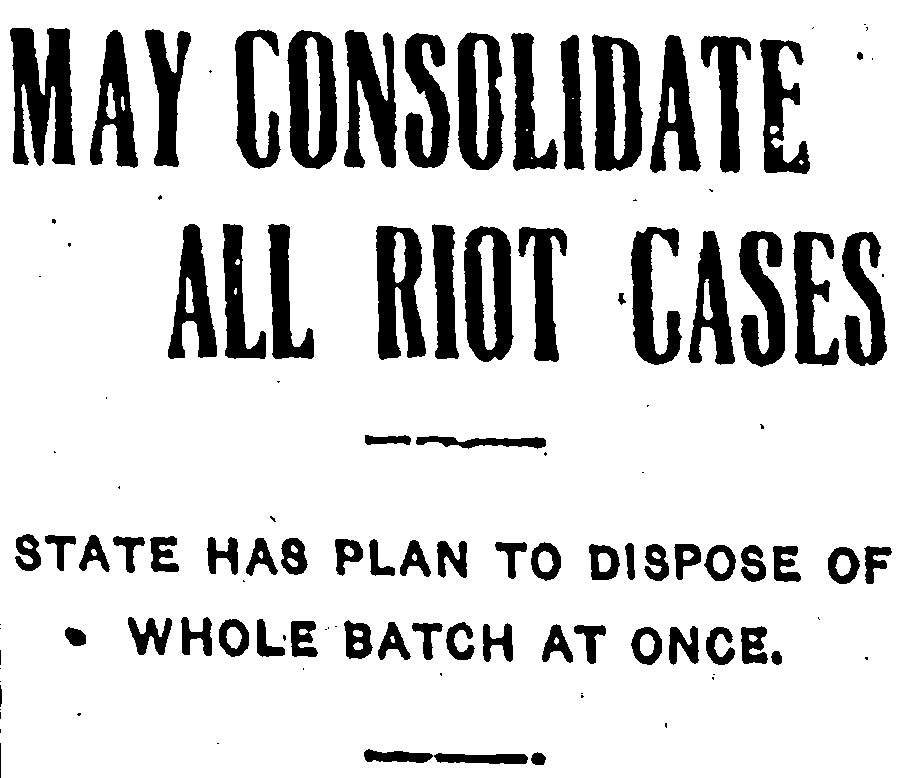
Illinois State Journal

Young was found to have stolen property, from several businesses that were looted or destroyed, at his home. When questioned about them, he openly confessed that he took them during the attacks. Young also confessed a second time, that he set fire to 16 homes, and that he was also present for Scott Burton's lynching. Young, the first of those charged to be sentenced, was not tried as an adult, but sent to reformatory school.

Governor Deneen offered a reward of $200 (about $5,000 in 2018) to anyone with information about the lynchings; however, he stressed that it was payable only upon a conviction. The offer went ignored. Beyond a few misdemeanor pleas, no perpetrators were ever convicted of any of the violence.

Realizing no convictions would occur, the state attorney proposed to lump the last 35 indictments into a single "conspiracy" charge in order to save the country $10,000 from individual trials.

== Fate of James and Richardson ==
=== George Richardson ===
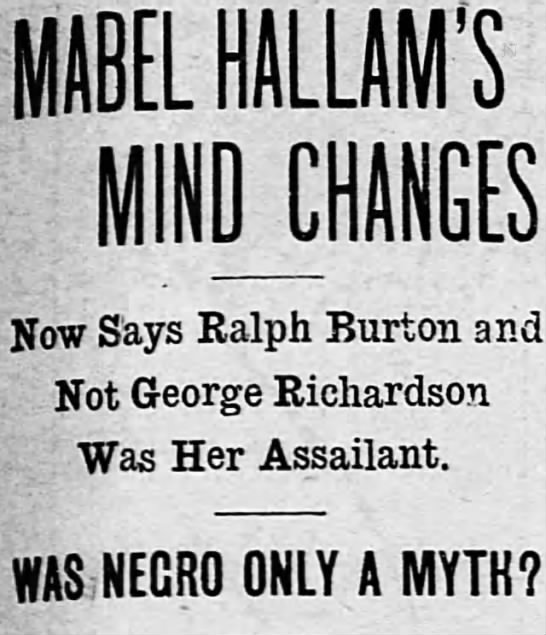
Decatur Herald. September 2, 1908.

When Richardson was in jail, expert doctors examined him and concluded that he had "no connection with her [Mabel Hallam] in any way." This was concluded as Mabel Hallam was afflicted with a sexually transmitted infection, born from her alleged rape, of which Richardson "was not affected."

Shortly before this revelation, Rolla Keyes, the witness that Hallam procured to support her accusation against Richardson, was accidentally shot by 14-year-old Harold McLaughlin when a revolver he was playing with accidentally discharged while he, Keyes, and 16-year old [Albert] Chester Brown were out fishing. Keyes was white, along with Harold and Chester, who lived on N. Fifth Street and North Fourth Street, respectively. Because he was a key Grand Jury witness for Hallam, his shooting upset many whites as rumors spread that he was shot by a black man as vengeance for testifying against Richardson. There was a fear that whites would again attack black people, with some proclaiming, "It's time to get after those niggers again. We'll have to go out and hang some more of them." However, the boys helped quell the pending attacks by providing more details about the accident and stipulating their fear of reporting it, as they, too, thought, it could lead to rumors that could incite more white violence. Following the shooting, no further news stories on Rolla were produced.

After Hallam was made aware of Richardson's medical examination, two weeks after Richardson had been indicted, she recanted her accusation about him and, on September 1, then accused "Ralph Burton," who she alleged to be the 19-year-old son of the lynched, Scott Burton. Hallam stated she was certain young Burton, who was rumored to be in Wichita was her attacker:

The negro who assaulted me was shorter and stouter than my husband, who is five feet six inches, and weighs about 135 pounds. I could not tell whether the fellow was light or dark-skinned, so frightened was I by what was happening. I positively know Richardson did not commit the crime and am not backward in acknowledging the mistake. But if the right negro is brought before me I would be able to identify him beyond a doubt in a short time.

However, Scott Burton's son, Charles, and wife, Kate, told authorities that Burton had no such son.

With Hallam no longer pressing charges, George Richardson was released from jail without incident. He received no restitution or apology for his time away from work or harm to his name. He went on to work as a janitor, and lived until he was 76, when he died at St. John's Hospital. His obituary did not mention the events of 1908.

=== Mabel Hallam ===
Hallam would again recant her accusation – this time of Burton's alleged son – later admitting that she lied in order to cover up an assault suffered at the hands of her husband after he found out about an affair she was having with another white man, when she began exhibiting symptoms of her STI. To provide an explanation for her battered face, she concocted the story that she was raped by a black man. No charges were filed against her for perjury or for making a false report.

Hallam and her husband moved to Chicago shortly after the events. She died in 1921, purportedly of suicide, at the age of 34.

=== Joe James ===
==== Trial ====
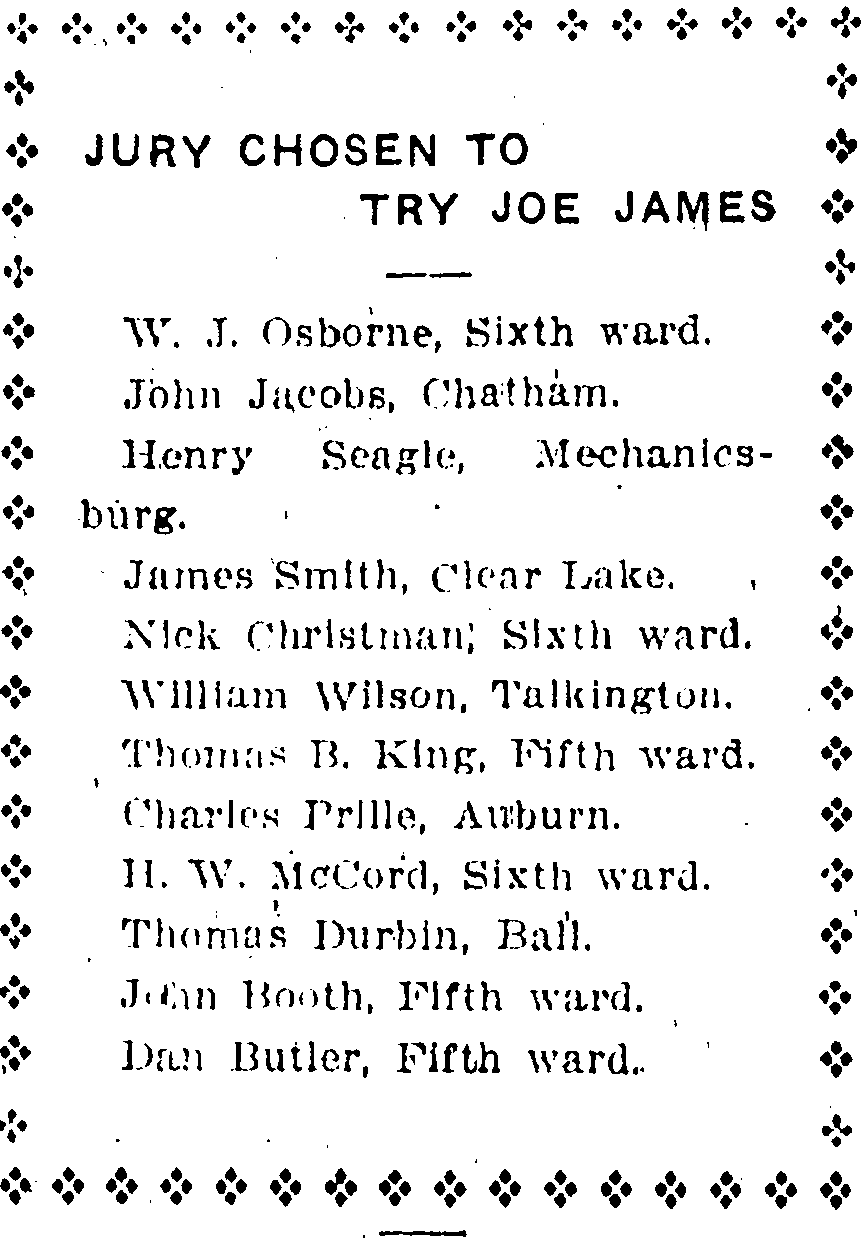
Illinois State Register

Shortly after Richardson was released, Joe James, who, within two days of Ballard's death, had been labeled as "the negro who killed Clergy Ballard," was brought to trial.

Many black people in the city feared being attacked again if James was acquitted, packing their personal effects so they could leave town the moment the jury read its verdict. Judge Creighton also ordered a special venire of 100 jurors to be on hand. A total of 123 potential jurors were excused before the final jury was compiled. The defense barred men born in the south from serving on the jury. The defense also asked potential jurors to reveal where they were during the riotous attacks and to reveal if they harbored any prejudice toward black people.

During his incarceration, he "repeatedly" refused to enter a guilty plea of murder. He initially entered a plea of "not guilty," but his lawyers changed the plea right before the trial began, and entered one of "self defense."

James was represented, pro-bono, by the black attorneys Octavious V. Royall and A. Morris Williams. Royall requested a change of venue, noting his belief that James could not receive a fair trial in the county, but Judge James A. Creighton denied the request, stating:

In no county in the state does so little prejudice exist against the colored race as in the county of Sangamon.

As the trial began, several "Black Hand" letters were sent to Sheriff Werner, and left in the yard of the courthouse, threatening more violence if James was not hanged. The letters included demands such as: "If Joe James don't hang we are going to kill him and run every nigger out of town." An effigy of James was also hanged from a telephone pole at Third and Washington streets, with the message: "Nigger don't let the sun go down on you." The police excused the effigy as "a bit of humor."

===== The prosecution =====
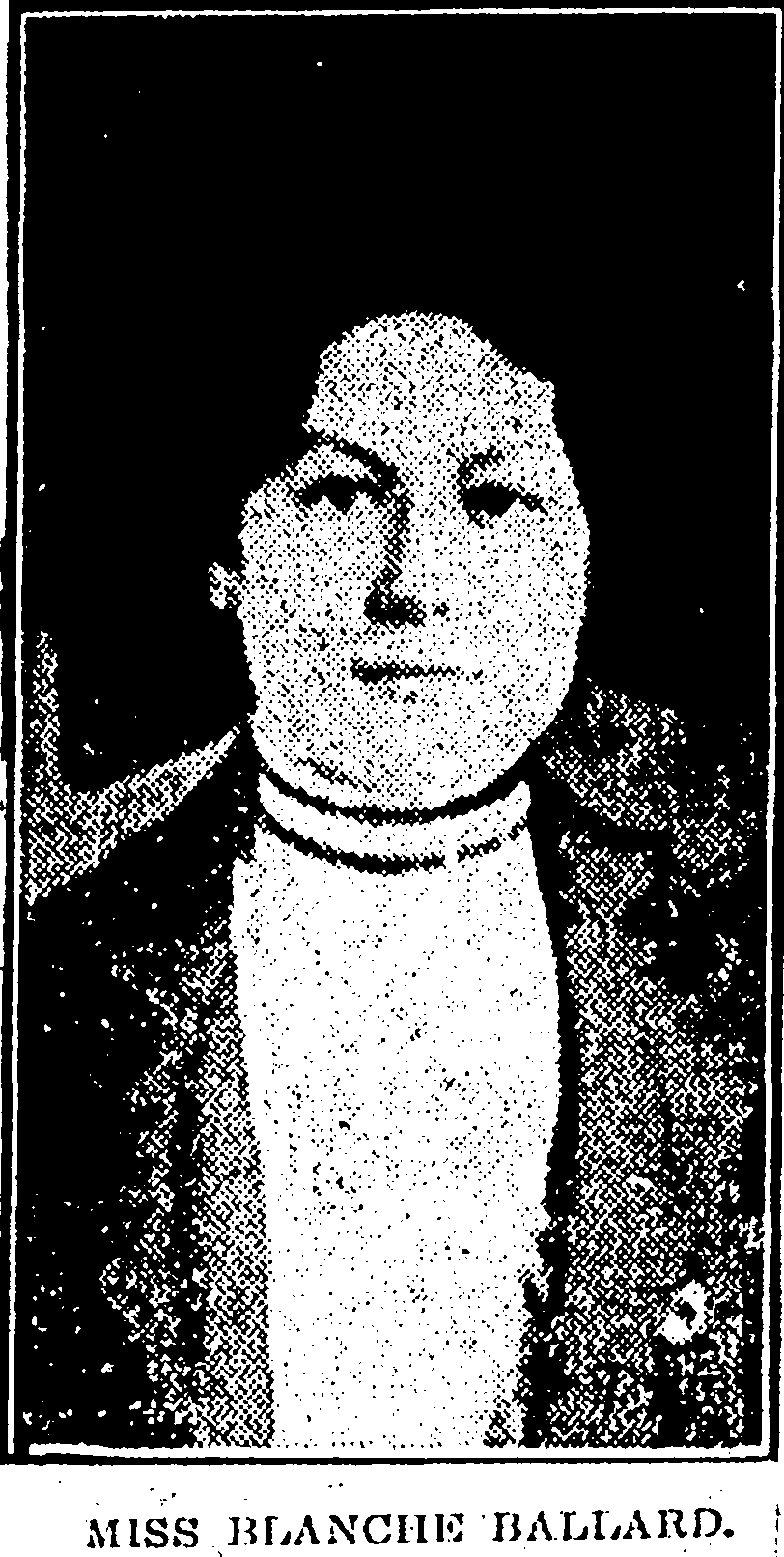
Blanche Ballard

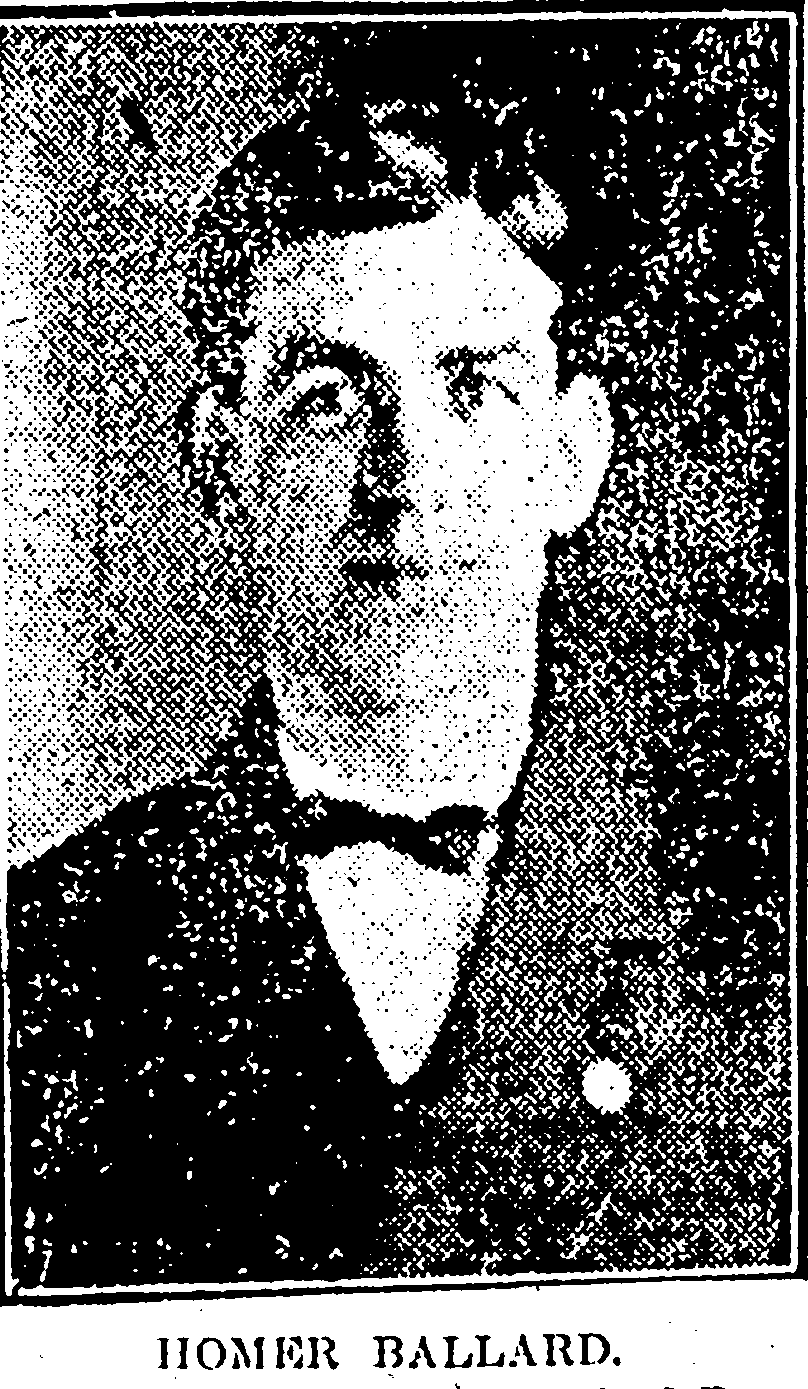
Homer Ballard

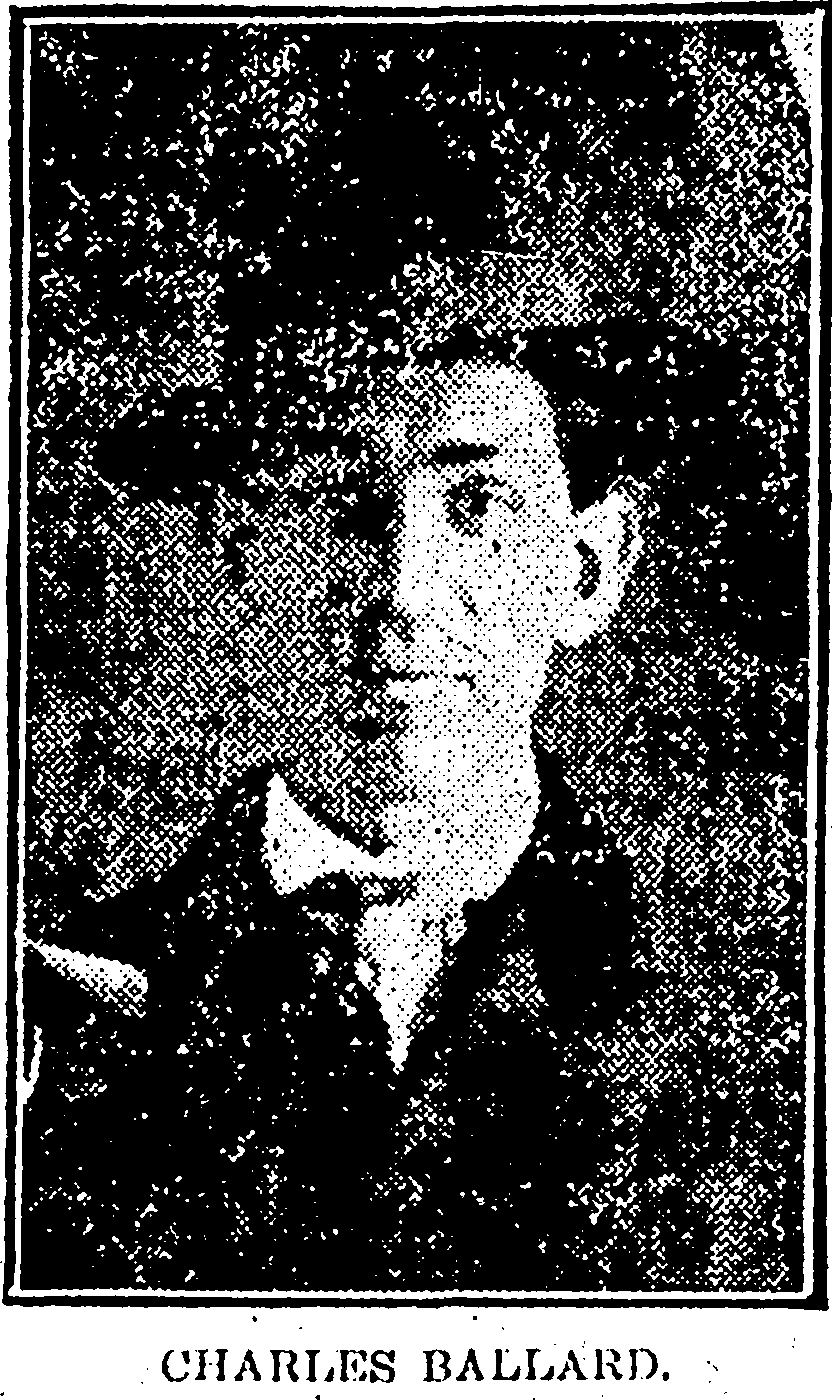
Charles Ballard

During the trial, Wines claimed that Ballard's killer wore "a light pair of trousers, a black coat, and new shoes which squeaked." He also stated that the piece of torn cloth, which Charles Ballard was now claiming to have found, matched James's shirt and that the hat, reportedly found in Ballard's yard, belonged to James.

Royall cross-examined Ballard's family and established that no one in family had really seen the alleged intruder – Blanche conceded that it had been too dark in her room for her to discern the skin color of the "form" that had intruded into her room, but stated that she felt a knife in his hand; Charles and Homer first saw the "guilty man" from at least 100 feet away after their father pointed him out; and Emma Ballard testified that while Ballard was fighting with the assailant that, during the nighttime commotion, she saw James, out on her front lawn, lunge at Ballard and "plunge a knife into his left lung (later reported to be his right lung)." Emma's account stood with the jury, though it contradicted Blanche's account of Ballard's alleged struggle with the assailant:

My father chased the man, or rather he and the man were fighting, for several hundred feet, and then my brothers rushed downstairs. They were in their nightclothes. While Homer picked up father, who by this time was almost unconscious from the loss of blood, papa said, pointing to the direction of the watch factory, 'There goes the black ––.' I could then see that the negro was dressed in a black coat and had on light trousers, and I got a good look at him.

— Blanche Ballard, testimony

I went out on the porch with my husband and we looked around for the man who was in the house. We didn't know that he was a negro then. We then heard a squeaky noise. I think it was James' shoes, and just then I saw a dark form rush around the house and strike my husband who was on the end of the porch...and then they fought. I think the man must have cut my husband ten times with a knife. Then my sons picked my husband up, I heard him tell them not to chase after the negro. He pointed across the street and said, 'There goes that black –– that killed me.' I saw him when he passed under the light and believe the right man is under arrest. I can identify the clothes.

— Emma Ballard, testimony

I got home about 12 o'clock the night of July 4th and went to bed at once. I was awakened by my sister calling and went downstairs. When I reached the front porch I saw my father about 40 feet away staggering as if he were drunk. I went out and helped him on the front porch. When he reached the porch he fell and, as I turned him over, he pointed across the street and said, 'There's the nigger, boys, that killed me.' I saw the negro coming out from between the two houses and my brother and myself gave chase...While I was chasing him I passed two electric lights. The negro was dressed in a light pair of pants and a black coat and his shoes squeaked while he was running. He had no hat. When I came out of the house, before I chased the negro, I stumbled over a winter hat. The next morning, about 5 o'clock, a telephone call was received at our home that a man who answered to the description of the man that stabbed my father was near Reservoir park. My brother and I went to the park and found a man with his shoes off and his coat over his head. I noticed that a piece was torn out of his shirt and that there was blood on his trousers. When I saw this, I struck him several times. I'm pretty certain this is the man who did the deed. His height, build, clothes and everything about him tells me that this is the man. It couldn't have been anyone else.

— Homer Ballard, testimony

I got home about 10 o'clock the night of July 4th. After I had been to sleep, I heard my sister holler, 'Help! I then went downstairs and saw my brother coming in with my father. Father pointed to the negro across the street and said, 'Boys, there is the man that killed me.' When I came back from chasing the negro, my father said he had torn a piece of the shirt from the negro. I went to look for it and found it in the yard...the right man, right there [who killed my father].

— Charles Ballard, testimony

Another man, Hugh Costigan, testified that when Ballard's sons were chasing the assailant, the assailant ran by, fifty feet away front of him, at the corner of North Grand and Seventh streets. He swore that the clothes James was wearing, were the clothes of the man who ran by him. One of the ladies who found James the morning after Ballard's death, Genevieve Ford, testified that she saw James lying on the ground with a "coat over his head." Officer Jack Golden testified that, two days after James was arrested, he told him that he won $1.75 while playing craps, which he took to buy a new pair of shoes, and admitted that the cap Homer Ballard said to have found, was his cap.

===== The Defense =====
James, who, since his arrest, had earned the moniker of "the silent one," took the stand. He was one of the few witness for his defense. He maintained that he had no knowledge of how he ended up at Reservoir Park, and maintained that he had no knowledge of the crime throughout the trial:

On the afternoon of July 4, I came out of jail to get some things for the prisoners – a can of syrup, a loaf of bread and a piece of pie I stopped at a restaurant on Eighth and Washington streets. I then crossed the street to the grocery store and got [these things]. The sun was still up. I bought two cans of beer there. I left Dandy Jim's place before dark. I went to another [black] saloon and won $4.00 shooting craps. I would stay at Dandy Jim's [playing piano] and then go out for a few minutes. I went to another saloon late and got some whiskey...I don't remember leaving the last saloon. I can't remember getting the half pint of whiskey there. The last I know, someone gave me a nickel to shoot craps, and I don't know whether I spent it or put it in my pocket. I don't recollect where I stayed all night. The next thing I remember was in the station house throwing up. I don't recollect where I stayed all night that night. I don't recollect whether anyone was beating me or not. I heard someone say, 'How do you do?' and then I don't remember anymore until Sunday morning in the station house. When I came to myself the next morning I couldn't see. There is a wound in my knee and a scar on my forehead. I don't know how I got them.

— Joe James, testimony

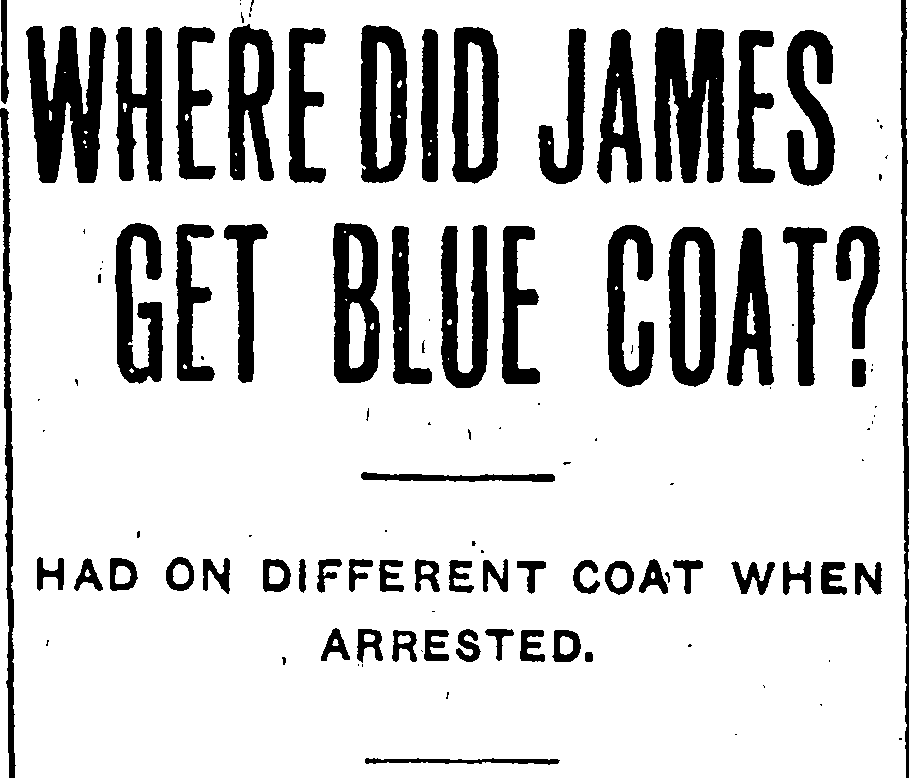
Illinois State Register

James further identified the evidentiary hat, shirt and "trousers" as belonging to him, but testified that he did not recollect wearing a coat that day, being in a fight, or being in anyone's home. Authorities conceded that James left the only coat he owned – a brown coat – at the jail when he left on July 4, and they did not know where he got the black coat, which was now identified as being blue. Ultimately, the coat, that James did not leave with but was found with "thrown over his head," was dismissed in the media as being an item James stole from the Ballard home, despite it not belonging to anyone in the Ballard family. The ownership of the coat was not mentioned at trial.

James also admitted being acquainted with some people who "loafed around" Charlie Lee's saloon, but denied ever having a knife. When asked if he ever used a razor, he maintained that the only razor he'd seen since arriving in Springfield was used by prisoners and, afterward, taken back by the jailer.

George Wilson, a black man, testified that he saw James at Dandy Jim's around 9:00 p.m., and saw him again, at Ed White's saloon, around 11:00 p.m., carrying a can of syrup and a loaf of bread, while drinking until he did not sound "right." He also testified that he had seen James two weeks earlier. Ed White, a black saloon owner, testified that James was at the saloon with a can of molasses and a loaf of bread, when he purchased a half-pint of whiskey. Nina Collins, a woman who had "long since lost all that modesty that is woman's finest quality," testified that she saw James playing the piano and take several drinks at Dandy Jim's before he left around "11:30 or 12 o'clock." She also testified that she had seen him two or three weeks earlier. James Cannon, a black man who drank with James at Dandy Jim's that night, stated that they had gone through several bottles of wine and "six or seven" whiskey shots before James left "about 12 o'clock."

Royall tried to press that, even if James was guilty, he had been drunk and, having been in jail during his entire time in Springfield, except for the day of the killing and the day he arrived, he could not have known Ballard. Therefore, the killing could not have been premeditated, which would make the killing manslaughter, not murder.

James testified that he was "19 or 20" years old, which would make him too young for the death penalty. His testimony surprised the prosecution, which called on Sheriff Werner, Officer Golden, along with another deputy and police officer, to testify that James told them he was 22 or 23 years old. James disputed their testimony.

Near the end of the trial, the jury made "one of the most startling discoveries." The jury examined the shirt James was wearing the morning he was arrested. On the shirt, near the torn part, were bloody fingerprints that the jury initially thought to be a "clot." The jury concluded that they must have been Clergy Ballard's, ruling out that they could have come from anyone else.

The stabbing of Ed Jamison, and the robbery of his coat, on the night of Ballard's death, was not mentioned.

In addition, there were other claims, made by Ballard's family and the police department, that were not questioned, explained or verified (i.e. how, or when, James, who had been in jail for over a month, prior to the night in question, and who had played piano most of that night, had procured the alleged murder weapon). Royall noted these questions in his review of the testimony:

How easy it would have been for someone to snatch a piece of the shirt from James as he lay sleeping on the morning of the 5th of July at Reservoir park. No guilty man in his right senses would go six blocks away from where the fatal blow was struck and lie down to pleasant dreams.

Royall stated that it was "impossible" for James to have committed the crime, and asked for the jury not to be swayed by "passion or prejudice, but upon the law and evidence." He pointed at a picture of Abraham Lincoln that hung in the room, and pleaded with the jury to "give this young colored boy just the same chance as they would a white boy."

Despite such questions and pleas, in a courtroom "crowded to suffocation," the jury convicted James of the premeditated murder of Clergy Ballard. The jury reached its decision with greater "rapidity" than other such murder trials. The entire trial took three days. And despite being too young to receive the death penalty in Illinois, he was sentenced to hang. After the verdict was read, James, whose case was reported as being "hopeless from the start," said to the court:

I have told all I know; I have nothing further to say.

In the month leading up to his death, James maintained his silence. He read his Bible and refused to speak to reporters, only referring them to his prior statements.

==== Hanging ====
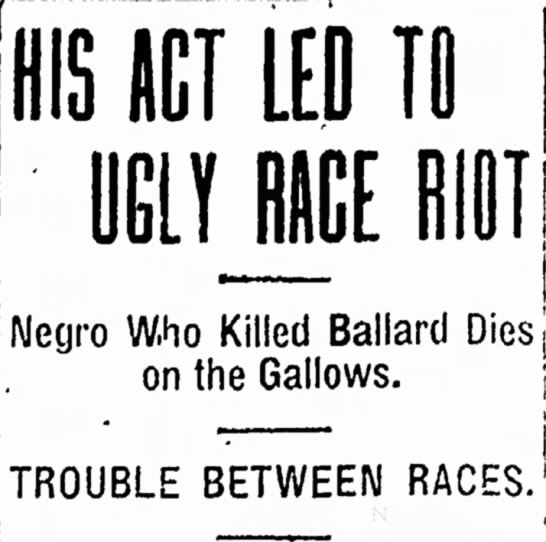
Cumberland Evening Times.

A week prior to James's hanging, his mother, Katherine "Katie" Roberts, wrote a letter to Sheriff Werner that she wanted to be there for her son's hanging, but was "too poor to make the trip." However, by the day before James's hanging, Katie was able to visit James's before his death, as numerous black women in her community donated money to her so that she could travel to see James before he died.

Roberts was able to see her son twice when she arrived. During her first visit, James reportedly "never once looked into his mother's face, while she gazed with tear-dimmed eyes into his." Reportedly, the mother and son said few words, with James occasionally muttering, "Mother." During her last visit, he also reportedly told her that he was innocent of the crime, but not innocent of sin. They then gave each other a long hug, and she stared at him, for about three minutes before leaving. She reportedly half-muttered, "Goodbye," on her way out.

James, described as a "negro boy scarcely of legal age," and who had no money to appeal his sentence, was hanged in the Sangamon County Jail on October 23, 1908, at 10:30 a.m. He was hanged on the city's old gallows, unused since 1898, but refurbished specifically for his death. Nearly 150 spectators witnessed the hanging, including eight sheriffs from nearby counties who were invited as guests of Sheriff Werner. Only two black people were present for James's hanging – James's lawyer and his spiritual adviser.

Before he was hanged, Sheriff Werner asked him if he had anything to say. He responded, "No sir." Two minutes later, Sheriff's Deputy, Fred Long, sprung the trap. It took 11 minutes for James to die. When his body was taken down, the noose was so tight around his neck that it could not be loosened by hand, and had to be cut.

Thousands waited in line to view the gallows, with many asking for a piece of the hemp, from the rope that hanged James, as a souvenir. Later, seven thousand people waited in line, outside the undertakers' shop, McCabe & Gaa, to see his body on display. The next day, his mother claimed his body, and took it on a train back to Birmingham.

Although it was stated by his spiritual advisors – Rev. Doswell, a black minister, and Rev. Brandt, of the Evangelical Lutheran Church – who accompanied him to the scaffold on the morning he was hanged, that James "maintained, to the end, that he had nothing to confess as he knew nothing of what occurred on the night of the crime," he provided a statement, right before he was hanged, that was taken as a confession. It had been provided at the urging of a white religious inmate volunteer, Mary Hickey, who pressured the young man to confess so his soul would not be damned. He allegedly wrote the following statement:

I am sorry for the crime I committed. Drunkenness was the cause of it. In that I have grossly sinned against Mr. Ballard, his family and each and every citizen. But I ask for each and everyone's forgiveness. When the deed was committed, I was a sinner, and a man of the world. Since then, I have become a Christian and am confident that God has forgiven me my sins. To each and every one, I, Joe James, wish to say – whisky and the evil effects of it, are the cause of my being where I am today. I did not realize the greatness of my crime until I was brought to the city prison the next morning after I committed it.

— Joe James, October 23, 1908

Moments after witnessing the hanging, Homer Ballard stated:

Perhaps James was drunk when he killed my father, but it's hard for me to believe. I ran him to North Grand Avenue and was unable to overtake the fleeing negro. James was able to run, and if he was as drunk as they claimed, it does not appear to me that he would be able to make such fast time.

The day after he was hanged, the Illinois State Journal commented on the importance of James to Springfield:

Springfield will not soon forget Joe James...the youthful Alabama negro has played too important a role on the stage of life in the city to have his name quickly erased from the tablets of memory.

==== Age and weapon ====
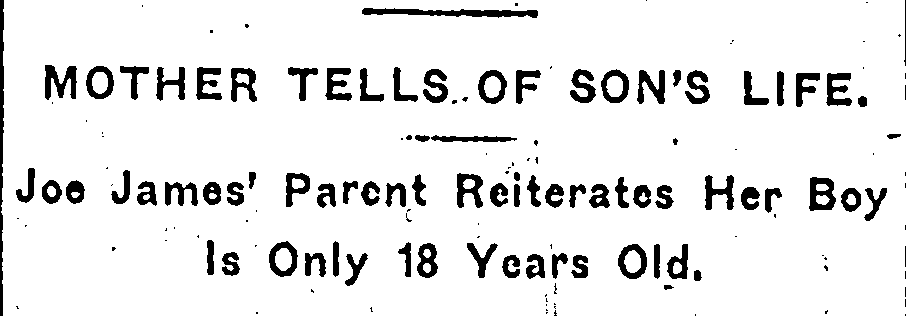
Illinois State Journal

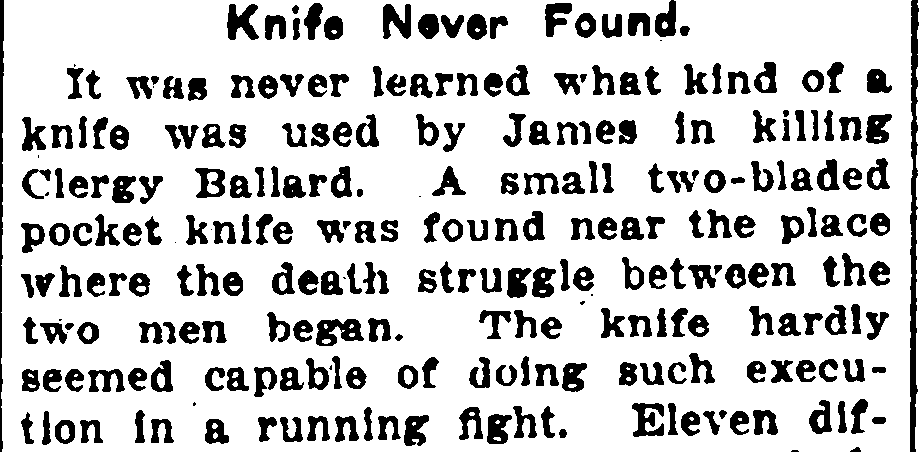
Illinois State Register

In his last written statement, James wrote that he was 20 years old. However, a day after he was arrested, the Illinois State Journal reported that James said he was 24 years old. Before he was hanged, James's mother, Katherine Roberts, wrote a letter to Sheriff Werner, noting that James was born on November 28, 1890, making him 17 years old. The letter was introduced in James's trial, but the state fixed James's age to 23 years old.

After James was hanged, Roberts gave an accounting of James's life to Springfield newspapers before she left with his body. She maintained that his birthday was November 28, 1890. However, on his death certificate, the state recorded him as being 23-years-old.

Upon James's arrest, Officer Golden was said to have found a "penknife" near where James was found sleeping (though, it was never stated if there was any blood found on the knife). It would later be reported that the penknife was found near Ballard's home – "near the place where the death struggle between the two men began." However, the small, two-bladed penknife was always determined to be incapable of inflicting the types of wounds that Ballard sustained, in particular the "knife thrust" that punctured his lung and the deep cuts across his arms, below his elbows, that had "severed muscles to the bone." Because of this, authorities conceded that they did not know what type of knife was used to kill Ballard, nor was one that was capable ever found.

When confronted with this discrepancy, the Ballard family dismissed the findings, stating that "the negro used both hands in a manner that seemed to indicate that he had a weapon in each."

== See also ==
- Nadir of American race relations
- Mass racial violence in the United States
- Lynching in the United States
- List of incidents of civil unrest in the United States
