= Antonio Mirabito =

East Coast Black Hand boss

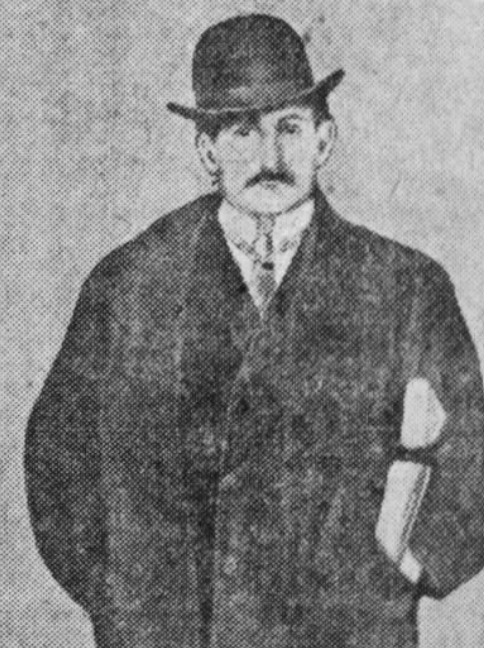
- Antonio Mirabito’s image from The Boston Globe newspaper, 1908
- Born: July 1, 1886; Malfa, Province of Messina, Sicily, Italy
- Died: August 18, 1977 (aged 91); Boston, Massachusetts, U.S.
- Resting place: Gethsemane Cemetery; Boston, Massachusetts, U.S.
- Other name: Frederico Baryndo
- Occupations: Gangster, Racketeer, fruit store owner
- Known for: East Coast Black Hand boss
- Spouse: Concettina Natoli (m. 1914)
- Children: Francis, Felisco, Giacomino, Maria, Catherine, Mary, Genevieve, Josephine, and Lucy Mirabito
- Parents: Francesco Mirabito; Concetta Sabato
- Relatives: Pasquale Mirabito, brother
- Allegiance: Black Hand Society
- Criminal charges: Larceny, Attempted Extortion
- Penalty: 6 years' imprisonment (1908)

Antonio Mirabito (alias Frederico Baryndo; June 11, 1884 - August 18, 1977) was a notorious Italian immigrant who was believed to be the boss of a network of Black Hand gangs located in the Northeastern Region of the United States in the early 20th century. He was the first person in New England to be arrested for crimes associated with Black Hand. His arrest was widely publicized and he was punished heavily in hopes of demoralizing others who were participating in the growing practice, which was a predecessor to the Mafia. He left his career in crime after he married and had 9 children.

== Early life ==
Mirabito was born on July 1, 1886, in Malfa, Province of Messina in the region of Sicily, in Southern Italy. He spent his childhood there, and immigrated to the United States at the age of 16. He arrived in New York, and swiftly moved into the Greater Boston area. He likely lived between Watertown, Massachusetts and Boston, Massachusetts. His life would not be well documented until his early twenties, when his Black Hand activity was discovered. However, earlier accounts of his interactions with the law can help provide some information.

== Early crime ==
As a teenager, Antonio Mirabito was known for committing various forms of petty theft. He was “well known” for this in his communities within both Boston and Watertown, and received his first criminal sentencing on May 10, 1905, for the larceny of a bicycle. This early crime was not believed to be associated with any criminal organization. He may have begun to get involved with criminal establishments around late 1905 with his commission of a sham marriage between himself and a woman named Elsie Nicklon. The falsely married couple lived in Boston's neighborhood of Allston, and only remained together briefly. They separated about a year before Mirabito's Black Hand imprisonment due to the actions of his brother, Pasquale Mirabito, who received an adultery charge for seducing Nicklon to leave him. Following this, Antonio Mirabito rapidly developed a Black Hand crime network that he would later become known for on a national level.

== Black hand conviction ==
In 1908, at age 22, Mirabito's leading role in the Northeast's Black Hand operations became exposed through police intervention into one of his attempted extortions.

=== Tracked mail ===
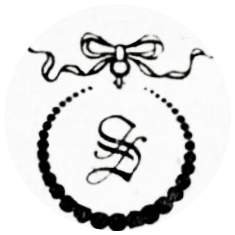
Stamp used by Mirabito while signing letters as "Frederico Baryndo"

The first letter in the series of correspondence that resulted in Antonio Mirabito's arrest was sent around December 1907 to Benjamin Piscopo, a hotel owner in the Italian neighborhood of Boston's North End. It was part of a group of three letters, sent and received over the course of three months, demanding that $1000 (nearly $30,000 in today's money) be forfeited in the form of a certified check. This method of payment was chosen to allow Mirabito to cash the check anywhere, with little ties to the banking process. He also ordered Piscopo not to reveal the demand to anyone, and threatened that he would murder both him and his family if the request was not fulfilled.

After receiving the initial letter, Piscopo consulted the Boston Police department on how to manage the blackmail. Initially, an attempt at capturing Mirabito failed. Then the police department's chief, Chief Watts, along with the acting inspector from the U.S. Bureau of Criminal Investigations (the FBI of the time) took the case. He worked alongside the United States Postal Service to create and track a decoy letter that was returned to the writer, who used the alias Frederico Baryndo and at the time was unknown. Police believed Mirabito's fruit store on Bowdoin Street in Dorchester to be the source of the crime after the decoy letter was accepted there. An investigation was made into Mirabito's business and home, during which police found the stamp press and the same style of paper used in the Black Hand letters. The police interpreter also stated to police that he lived in the area and noticed Mirabito acting suspiciously for the past few weeks. While they could not find the decoy letter itself, the delivery boy identified the letter recipient, Concetto Rizzo. Both he and Mirabito were taken into custody on February 23, 1908.

=== Concetto Rizzo ===
Rizzo was a 27 year old Italian immigrant who lived at the fruit store Antonio owned. It is likely that Rizzo also worked in the fruit store, and was aware of Mirabito's Black Hand operations. However, after their arrests, Rizzo denied any connection to the crime. He reported Mirabito as the sole actor, and stated that his only involvement was in providing Mirabito his mail. He also retained a personal lawyer, who promoted his character and degraded Mirabito's. Mirabito remained as the primary suspect moving into court, with a bail twice as high as Rizzo's.

=== Court proceedings ===
Both men were arraigned on February 24, 1908, and held in jail until their court date. Their case began in Boston's superior criminal court on March 25, for which the courtroom was completely filled with people interested in witnessing the moment. Working against Mirabito were both the Massachusetts assistant district attorney and police chief Watts. Rizzo and his attorney were also testifying against Mirabito in court. After a little over a week of proceedings, Mirabito was indicted by a jury on April 3 for the charge of attempted extortion as a result of the letters sent to Piscopo. The court refused a retrial of the case, stating they had seen enough evidence to know Mirabito had committed the crime. Mirabito was assigned a sentence of 6 to 10 years in prison, and was recommended to receive a harsher sentence due to severity of his Black Hand organization's impact on the region.

=== Connection to Boston ===
As a result of his crime, Antonio Mirabito became well known in the Northeastern Region of the United States. Elite individuals throughout the area had consistently been terrorized by his demands. His arrest landed him on the front page of the Boston's leading newspapers, and was reported across all of the Northeast. Mirabito's case was the first Black Hand conviction in Massachusetts, and all of New England. With his removal from the Black Hand crime scene, officials were hopeful that his branch of the organization would dissolve and the extortion tactic would end. However, it survived Mirabito and eventually became the Mafia.

== Family life, death ==
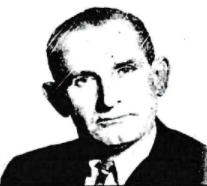
Image of Antonio Mirabito in his later years

After he got out of prison, Antonio Mirabito never got reinvolved with crime. He met and established a legitimate marriage with Concettina Natoli, who would be his wife until her death 63 years later. Together, they had nine children. They lived out their lives in Boston's neighborhood of Dorchester. Mirabito's children also stayed in Boston, although some moved into its surrounding cities. Concettina died at the age of 83, and Antonio Mirabito passed five years later at the age of 91. Both of them were buried within Boston at Gethsemane Cemetery.

After his death, crime struck Mirabito's family in the form of his son, Felisco, and his wife, Marie's, deaths. They were killed in what was determined by police to be a murder-suicide, with Felisco being the aggressor. However, police could not at all determine why it was committed, so other forms of crime could not be ruled out. Both Felisco and Marie were buried in Gethsemane Cemetery in Boston, alongside Antonio Mirabito.
