= A Captain's Duty =

Book by Richard Phillips

- Hardcover edition
- Author: Richard Phillips with Stephan Talty
- Language: English
- Subject: Piracy
- Genre: Nonfiction
- Publisher: Hyperion Books
- Publication date: April 6, 2010
- Publication place: United States
- Media type: Hardcover
- Pages: 304 pp.
- ISBN: 978-1-4013-2380-6
- OCLC: 674694313

A Captain's Duty: Somali Pirates, Navy SEALs, and Dangerous Days at Sea is a book by Captain Richard Phillips, the captain of the container ship MV Maersk Alabama when it was hijacked in 2009. It was written with Stephan Talty and published by Hyperion on April 6, 2010 (and on audio by Tantor). It was adapted in a 2013 film, Captain Phillips.

The book tells the story of Phillips' capture and hostage-taking by Somali pirates in April 2009. It alternates between his five-day ordeal and the plight of his family in Vermont, watching the drama unfold on cable news. ABC News reported that the publication of his book coincided with a rise in concern about piracy.

== Plot ==
Phillips was a mariner of 30 years' experience when his ship was taken. He took extensive security precautions to keep his crew safe and hidden, leaving himself as the only possible hostage. This led to an ordeal of several days in a lifeboat in the hands of pirates, whom Phillips portrays as alternately conciliatory, vicious, and unfocused.

Meanwhile, the U.S. Navy assembled a large task force, and tensions steadily rose, as did Phillips’ fear for his life. The book details Phillips' attempted escape and eventual rescue by U.S. Navy SEALs, and portrays Phillips' wife Andrea as loyal and strong-willed.

== Production ==
Just weeks after his rescue from the Somali pirates, the American talent agency Creative Artists Agency (CAA) signed Phillips, and auctioned off his life rights to the publishing and film industries in the spring of 2009. American publisher Hyperion Books optioned the rights for Phillips' memoir in May 2009.

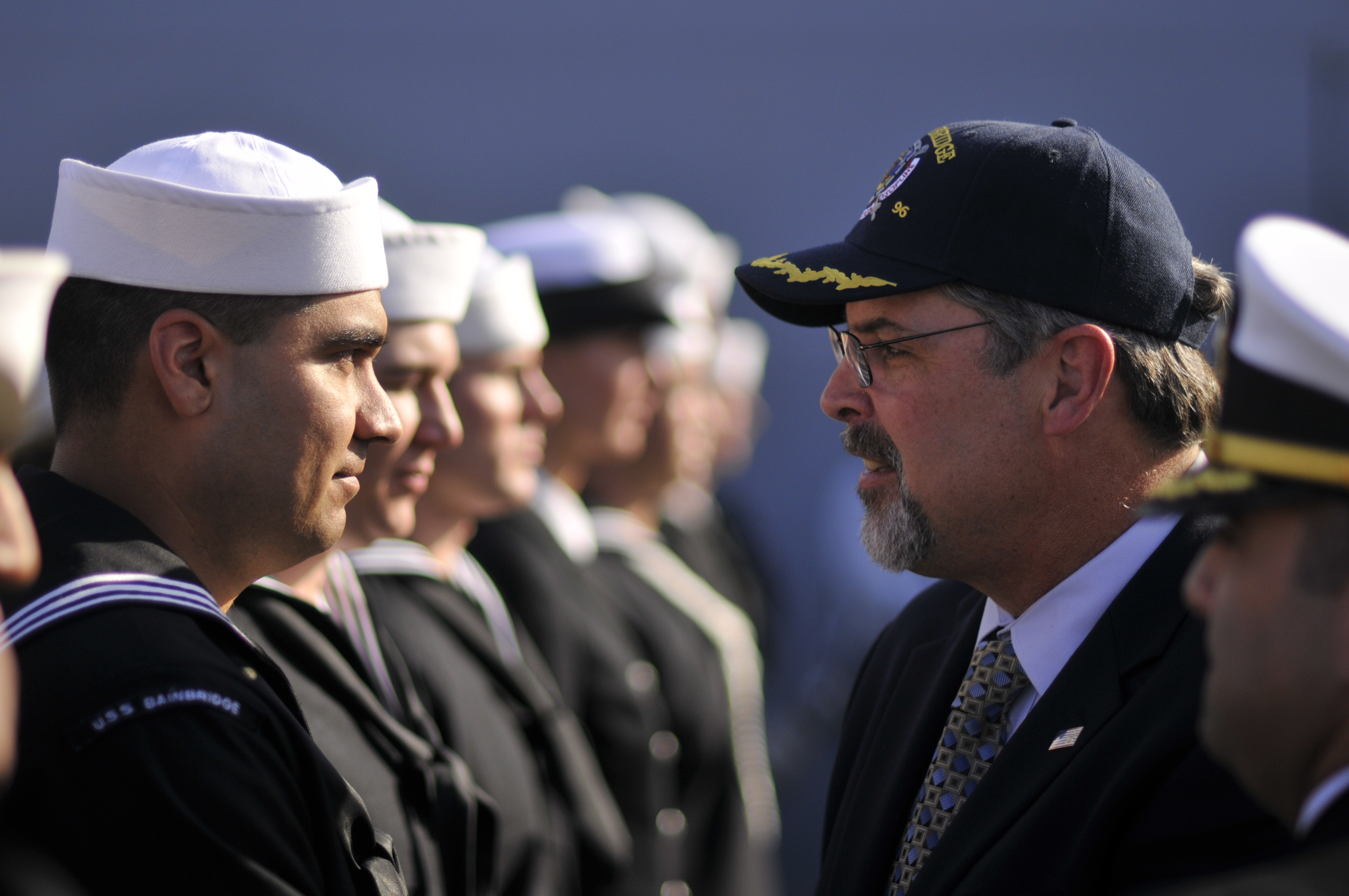
Phillips publicly thanks sailors for his dramatic rescue at sea.

On April 6, 2010, A Captain's Duty: Somali Pirates, Navy SEALS, and Dangerous Days at Sea, was released.

== Reception ==
Publishers Weekly review stated, "Phillips has a sailor's penchant for the dramatic, which he puts to good use alternating between his own five-day ordeal-replete with Navy SEALs and a daring escape attempt-and the plight of his family in Vermont, watching the drama unfold on cable news. Despite his harrowing experience, Phillips stays afloat with steadfast faith and an unfailing sense of humor that are, ultimately, rewarded. Phillips's story is not just riveting and timely, but also an informative, heartening look at perhaps the least-celebrated branch of the U.S. military, the Merchant Marines." The United States Merchant Marine is not one of the six branches of the U.S. military.

A reviewer of Penguin website wrote, "In A Captain's Duty, Richard Phillips tells his own extraordinary story – that of an ordinary man who did what he saw as his duty and in so doing became a hero. It is a thrilling true tale of adventure and courage in the face of deprivation, death threats and mock executions and also a compulsively readable first-hand account of the terrors of high-seas hostage-taking."

== Film adaptation ==
Columbia Pictures optioned the book and acquired the life rights to Phillips in spring 2009. Barkhad Abdi starred as the lead Somali pirate, Tom Hanks starred as Phillips and Faysal Ahmed as Najee in a Columbia film based on the hijacking and Phillips's book, scripted by Billy Ray, and produced by the team behind The Social Network. The film, entitled Captain Phillips, was released on October 11, 2013, to widespread critical acclaim.
