= Black Hand (extortion) =

Extortion racket and the gangs that used it

- La Mano Nera
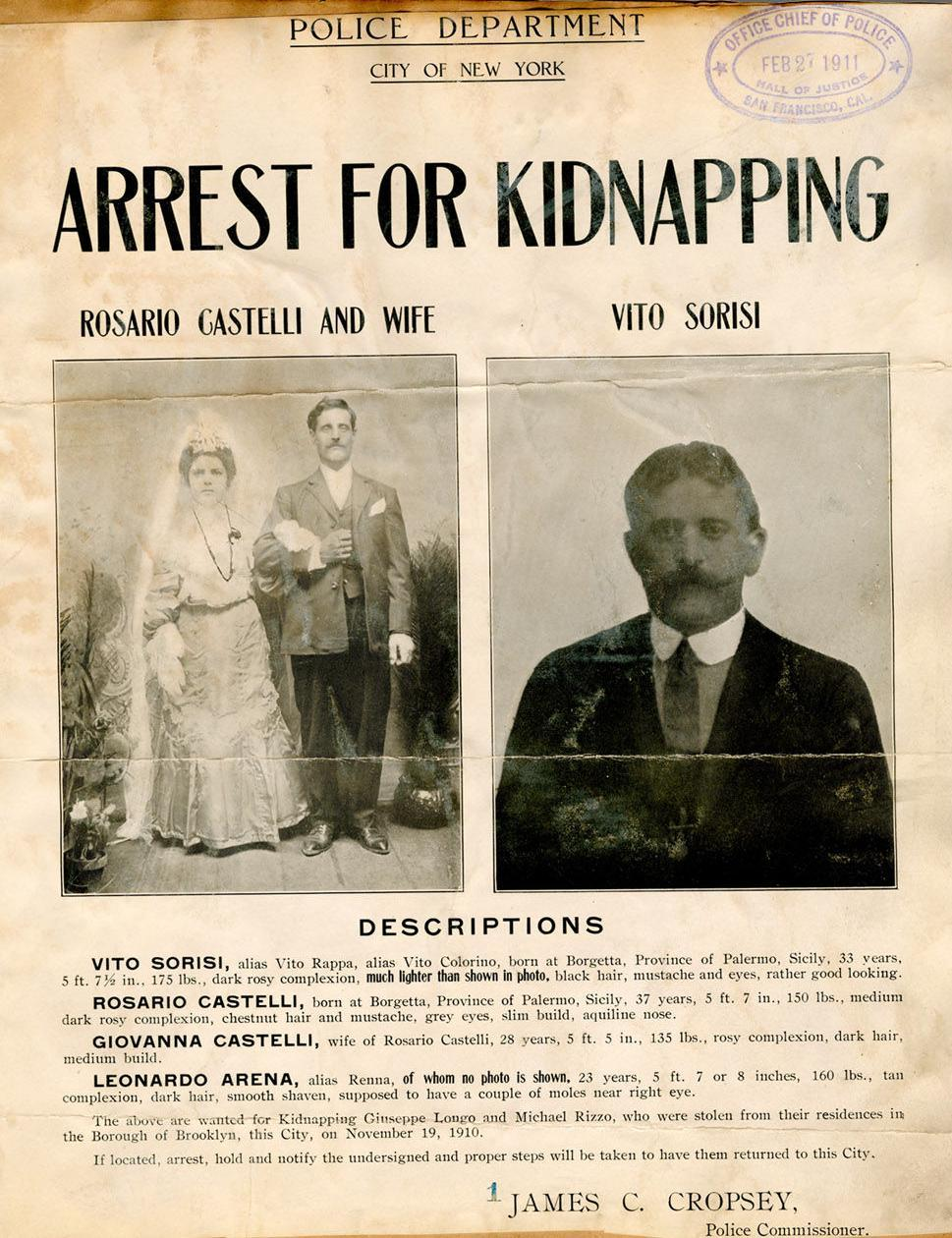
- A New York Police Department wanted poster for Black Hand activity, 1910
- Founding location: Southern Italy (roots); popularized in major United States cities
- Years active: c. 1880s - c. 1920s
- Territory: Major US urban centers (including New York City, Chicago, New Orleans, Philadelphia, and San Francisco)
- Ethnicity: Italian-American (primarily Sicilian and Neapolitan)
- Activities: Extortion, blackmail, kidnapping, arson, bombing, murder
- Allies: Various early Italian-American Mafia groups, Camorra gangs

Black Hand (Italian: Mano Nera) was a type of organized extortion committed mainly by criminal immigrants from southern Italy, active primarily in the eastern United States during the first quarter of the 20th century in Italian-American ghettos or neighborhoods. The term "Black Hand" was reportedly first used in New York City, in 1903. The practice gradually began to decline around 1915 and ceased to exist during the 1920s, when the first Mafia families in the U.S.—more organized and structured—began to emerge.

== History ==
The first reported use of the term "Black Hand" to describe extortion rackets among Italians in the United States was the Cappiello case of September 1903 in Brooklyn in New York City, when Nicolo Cappiello, a wealthy contractor, received a letter signed by the “Mano Nera,” demanding $1,000 with the warning that his house would be otherwise dynamited. Black Hand activities were widespread in every American city with a sizable Italian community, with New York City serving as the primary hub. The label "Black Hand" quickly came to be applied to nearly any violent crime in Italian neighborhoods in New York, Chicago, and other cities. It became the preferred term in American newspapers for describing unsolved crimes involving the Italian community until the early 1920s. These activities gradually, though inconsistently, declined after 1915, persisting in some parts of Pennsylvania into the 1920s.

In 1907, a Black Hand headquarters was discovered in Hillsville, Pennsylvania, a village located a few miles west of New Castle, Pennsylvania. The Black Hand in Hillsville established a school to train members in the use of the stiletto. Another Black Hand headquarters was later discovered in Boston, Massachusetts. This headquarters, managed by Antonio Mirabito, allegedly operated from New England to as far south as New York City. Police aspired to end the practice of Black Hand with Mirabito's arrest, but it continued in the area for about another decade. More successful immigrants were usually targeted, although as many as 90% of Italian immigrants and workmen in New York and other communities were threatened with extortion.

Typical Black Hand tactics involved sending a letter to a victim threatening bodily harm, kidnapping, arson, or murder. The letter demanded a specified amount of money to be delivered to a specific place. It was decorated with threatening symbols such as a smoking gun, hangman's noose, skull, or knife dripping with blood or piercing a human heart, and was frequently signed with a hand, "held up in the universal gesture of warning", imprinted or drawn in thick black ink. Author Mike Dash states "it was this last feature that inspired a journalist writing for The New York Herald to refer to the communications as 'Black Hand' letters – a name that stuck, and indeed, soon became synonymous with crime in Little Italy." The term "Black Hand" was readily adopted by the American press and generalized to the idea of an organized criminal conspiracy, which came to be known as "The Black Hand Society."

American newspapers in the first half of the twentieth century sometimes made reference to an organized "Black Hand Society", a criminal enterprise composed of Italians, mainly Sicilian, Neapolitan, and Calabrian immigrants. However, many Sicilians disputed its existence and objected to the associated negative ethnic stereotype, but this was not the only viewpoint among Italian-Americans. Il Telegrafo: The Evening Telegraph, a newspaper for the Italian American community in New York City, printed an editorial on 13 March 1909 in response to Joseph Petrosino's assassination, which read in part, "The assassination of Petrosino is an evil day for the Italians of America, and none of us can any longer deny that there is a Black Hand Society in the United States."

Tenor Enrico Caruso received a Black Hand letter on which were drawn a black hand and dagger, demanding $2,000. He decided to pay, "and, when this fact became public knowledge, was rewarded for his capitulation with 'a stack of threatening letters a foot high,' including another from the same gang for $15,000." He reported the incident to the police who arranged for him to drop off the money at a prearranged spot, then arrested two Italian businessmen who retrieved the money.

The Black Hand rackets were the first type of organized crime operations by immigrant Sicilians in the United States. Several gangsters involved in Black Hand operations were the predecessors of what would later become the crime families that would spread across the country. The Black Hand gangs gradually began to decline around 1915 and ceased to exist during the mid-1920s, when the first organized and powerful Mafia families began to appear.

== See also ==
- Black Hand (Chicago)

== Sources ==
- Critchley, David (2009). The Origin of Organized Crime in America: The New York City Mafia, 1891-1931. New York: Routledge. ISBN 978-0-415-99030-1.
- Dash, Mike (2009). The First Family: Terror, Extortion, Revenge, Murder, and the Birth of the American Mafia. New York: Random House. ISBN 978-1-4000-6722-0.
- Lombardo, Robert M. (2004). "The Black Hand: A Study in Moral Panic". Global Crime. No. 6:3–4.
- Pitkin, Thomas M.; Cordasco, Francesco (1977). The Black Hand: A Chapter in Ethnic Crime. Totowa (NJ): Littlefield, Adams. ISBN 9780822603337.
- Wallin, Geoff (3 July 2007). "In Little Italy, Mum's the Word About Mob". Chi-Town Daily News. Archived from the original on 23 April 2008.
- White, Frank Marshall (November 1917 – April 1918). "The Passing of the Black Hand". The Century Magazine. Vol. XCV.
- Black, Jon (October 2020). Secret Societies. ISBN 9781527268074.
