= The Black Hand (book) =

Book by Stephan Talty

- First edition
- Author: Stephan Talty
- Language: English
- Genre: Non-Fiction
- Publisher: Houghton Mifflin Harcourt
- Publication date: 25 April 2017
- Publication place: United States
- Media type: Print (hardback & paperback)
- Pages: 298 pp.
- ISBN: 978-1-785-03712-2

The Black Hand: The Epic War Between a Brilliant Detective and the Deadliest Secret Society in American History is a non-fiction book written by Irish American author Stephan Talty, published by Houghton Mifflin Harcourt on 25 April 2017.

== Characters ==
- Joseph Petrosino – a New York City police officer who is a pioneer in the fight against organized crime.

== Reception ==
The book received praise from critics. Author Mark Adams said: "The Black Hand is nonfiction noir at its best: a real-life Godfather prequel that pits an unforgettable Italian-American hero against the seemingly unstoppable menace that would become the New York mafia". Kirkus Reviews said it was: "A thrilling tale of the "Italian Sherlock Holmes"".

== Film adaptation ==
In 2017, Paramount Pictures announced that it had acquired the movie rights to Talty's book. Leonardo DiCaprio was slated to star as Petrosino.
