= Black Hand (graffiti artist) =

Iranian graffiti artist

- بِلَک هَند
- Style: Street art
- Movement: Graffiti

Black Hand (Persian: بِلَک هَند) is the pseudonymous Tag of an Iranian graffiti artist. Supporters have called them "Iran's Banksy". They remain anonymous because their graffiti is illegal.

Black Hand is known for using stencil art to comment on sexism in Iranian society, on the (legal) trade of human organs and on political events in the Middle East. In an interview with The Guardian Black Hand said, "The public has a right to see the art. I chose street art because I want to guard against the galleries’ monopoly. Our intellectual and artistic society are underestimating and ignoring ordinary people's power."

== Notable works ==
- Woman with a washing-up liquid bottle - this work appeared in June 2014 on a wall in Tehran, portraying a woman wearing an Iran football shirt and holding a washing-up liquid bottle above her head, as if it was a trophy. It appeared to be a comment on the exclusion (and separation) of women from sport. The work was later overpainted in red paint and finally removed altogether.
- The artist held an exhibition in April 2014 which took place in a condemned historic house in Tehran. In one room an image of each item of furniture was repeated multiple times, commenting on society's reliance on labels. In another room an installation was created commenting on threats to the environment. Black canvases sprayed with the word "Art" lined the hallway.
