= Black Hand (Chicago) =

Criminal tactic used by gangsters

Black hand symbol

During the late nineteenth and early twentieth centuries, Black Hand extortion became a serious problem in several American cities, particularly within Italian immigrant communities. The practice was especially associated with New York, Chicago, Boston, Philadelphia, and New Orleans.

The term Black Hand, or Mano Nera, referred primarily to a method of extortion rather than a single, centrally organized criminal society. Extortionists typically sent anonymous letters demanding money and threatening violence against those who refused to pay. Some letters contained drawings of a black hand, a dagger, a skull, or other intimidating symbols.

Victims faced threats of assault, kidnapping, murder, or the destruction of their homes and businesses. Bombings were sometimes used to demonstrate that these threats were genuine.

In Chicago, Black Hand extortion became particularly visible during the early 1900s. Some perpetrators were immigrants from southern Italy, including Sicily and Calabria, although their activities should not be confused with the broader Italian immigrant population, which was itself frequently victimized by these crimes.

Unlike established Mafia organizations, many Black Hand operations were relatively small and loosely organized. Some involved only one or two individuals, while others operated through larger criminal associations. Black Hand extortionists did not necessarily share a common leadership, membership structure, or code of conduct.

By the early twentieth century, Chicago's criminal underworld included competing groups involved in extortion, gambling, prostitution, and other illegal enterprises. One prominent figure was James “Big Jim” Colosimo, an Italian-born businessman and vice operator who controlled a network of brothels and other establishments.

Around 1909, Colosimo reportedly faced repeated extortion demands and threats against his life. Seeking protection, he brought Johnny Torrio, a criminal associate with connections to New York's Five Points Gang, to Chicago.

Torrio subsequently became an influential figure in Colosimo's organization. Historical accounts have associated him with violent efforts to suppress Black Hand extortionists, although specific claims about the number of men killed and Torrio's direct responsibility remain difficult to verify.

Following Colosimo's murder in 1920, Torrio emerged as a leading figure in Chicago's criminal underworld. During Prohibition, he helped develop a more extensive organization involved in illegal liquor distribution, gambling, and other rackets.

Al Capone, who had previously worked with Torrio, eventually succeeded him and expanded the organization that became known as the Chicago Outfit.

By the 1920s, Black Hand extortion had declined as a prominent label in Chicago, while larger and more sophisticated criminal enterprises gained influence. However, this transition was not simply a matter of the Black Hand being replaced by the Mafia. Mafia organizations had existed in Sicily since the nineteenth century, and some were already operating in the United States before Torrio's arrival in Chicago.

Rather, the early Black Hand period represented one aspect of a changing criminal environment in which loosely organized extortionists, established criminal associations, and emerging syndicates sometimes competed, overlapped, or operated independently.

The violence associated with Black Hand extortion formed part of the historical background against which Chicago's later organized crime networks developed.

== Johnny Torrio/Filippo Catalano ==
Johnny Torrio (January 20, 1882 – April 16, 1957), later known as “The Fox,” was born in Montepeloso, in the Basilicata region of southern Italy. After immigrating to the United States, he became involved in New York's criminal underworld before establishing himself in Chicago, where he would eventually emerge as a major figure in organized crime.

Around 1909–1910, Torrio became associated with James “Big Jim” Colosimo, a prominent Chicago vice operator who had reportedly been subjected to Black Hand extortion demands. Historical accounts have linked Torrio to a campaign of violence against Black Hand extortionists, including allegations that as many as ten men were killed during his early involvement in Chicago. However, the extent of Torrio's personal participation in these killings remains uncertain.

One of the men whose deaths have been associated with this period of violence was Filippo Catalano.

Born around 1874 in Gioia Tauro, Calabria, Filippo Catalano immigrated to the United States and eventually became the proprietor of a Chicago saloon. He was associated with the city's Italian immigrant community and its criminal nightlife. Contemporary accounts identified him as a suspected participant in Black Hand extortion.

According to accounts attributed to Captain Cudmore of Chicago's Third Precinct, Catalano was regarded with fear and hostility by some members of the Italian community. Such descriptions reflect the police perspective of the period and should not necessarily be taken as an impartial assessment of his reputation.

In the early morning hours of June 5, 1910, Catalano was shot five times after leaving the Vesuvius restaurant in Chicago. He was taken to People's Hospital, where he reportedly died approximately an hour later.

Reports indicate that Catalano did not identify his attacker before his death. Although his silence has sometimes been interpreted as an example of omertà, the traditional code of silence associated with certain criminal organizations, his actual reasons for withholding the name remain unknown.

Accounts of the subsequent investigation named Eugeno Monaco as an alleged gunman. Other historical narratives have suggested that Johnny Torrio may have been responsible for arranging Catalano's murder, possibly as part of the broader campaign against Black Hand extortionists. However, no conclusive evidence has been established demonstrating that Torrio ordered or personally carried out the killing.

Filippo Catalano's murder remains an episode in the violent history of Chicago's early Italian-American underworld, illustrating the conflicts that preceded the rise of the more structured criminal organizations of the Prohibition era.

== Black Hand Assassination ==
On March 27, 1910, Filippo Catalano was alleged to have shot John Jocko in front of 1821 South State Street in Chicago. Witnesses identified Catalano as the shooter, but Jocko survived and declined to prosecute. Catalano was subsequently released.

Less than three months later, on June 5, 1910, Catalano was murdered outside the Vesuvius restaurant, an establishment frequented by members of Chicago's nightlife. At approximately 3 a.m., Catalano left the restaurant accompanied by Edgar K. Accetta, a New York lawyer visiting Chicago on business, and a third, unidentified Italian man.

As the three approached a waiting automobile, the unidentified man allegedly drew a revolver and shot Catalano five times. The gunman fled on foot, disappearing near the Chicago, Rock Island and Pacific Railroad tracks. He escaped, and his whereabouts remained unknown.

Catalano's murder occurred during a period of violent conflict involving Chicago's Black Hand extortion networks. Some historical accounts have suggested that Johnny Torrio may have been connected to killings of Black Hand figures during this period, but his involvement in Catalano's death has not been conclusively established.

The identity of Catalano's killer and the circumstances behind the murder remain uncertain.

== Giordiani case ==
In 1911, four-year-old Maria Giordiani, the daughter of Italian immigrants Ricardo and Eleanor Giordiani, was found shot to death on the floor of her bedroom. Her parents had mysteriously disappeared and were never located. The case remained unsolved.

Authorities suspected that Maria's murder might have been connected to the Black Hand, a criminal extortion network that terrorized immigrant communities during the early twentieth century. According to one theory, her father, Ricardo, had accumulated debts following the collapse of his business and may have become the target of extortionists. His family reportedly had earlier connections to organized crime through his father.

Investigators also considered the possibility that Maria had been deliberately targeted to intimidate other families in the neighborhood. If true, her murder would have served as a particularly brutal warning of the consequences of resisting criminal demands.

Among the few belongings reportedly discovered in the family's apartment were a small doll, a copy of Roman de la Rose, and a shawl belonging to Eleanor Giordiani.

The disappearance of Maria's parents, the circumstances of her death, and the possible involvement of the Black Hand remain unresolved.

== Timeline ==
- 1908 – Chicago's Italian immigrant professionals organized the White Hand Society in response to Black Hand extortion; by February it had opened headquarters in the Masonic Temple Building to receive reports of threats and help protect victims.
- 1910 – Chicago police arrest over 200 known Italian gangsters and Black Hand members in a raid in Little Italy. However, none are convicted because many of the notes which contained extortion threats could not be traced to them.
- March 15, 1910 – The Chicago Vice Commission, a civic organization to close the brothels and panel houses of the Levee district, is organized.
- 1910 – Chicago racketeer Big Jim Colosimo brings his nephew Johnny Torrio, then with New York's Five Points Gang, to Chicago to eliminate Black Hand members in the city due to their extortion demands. Within a month, ten Black Hand extortionists had been killed.
- 1910 – Jim Cosmano, a major Chicago Black Hand leader, is severely wounded in an ambush by Johnny Torrio on a South Side bridge. Cosmano had previously demanded $10,000 and threatened to destroy Colosimo's cafe.
- June 6, 1910 – Filippo Catalano, an alleged Black hand extortionist, is gunned down after leaving the Vesuvius Restaurant.
- January 1 – March 26, 1911 – Thirty-eight Black Hand victims are killed by Black Hand assassins, many by the unidentified assassin known only as Shotgun Man, between Oak Street and Milton Street in Chicago's Little Italy.
