= Frank Castellano =

American Navy captain (born 1964)

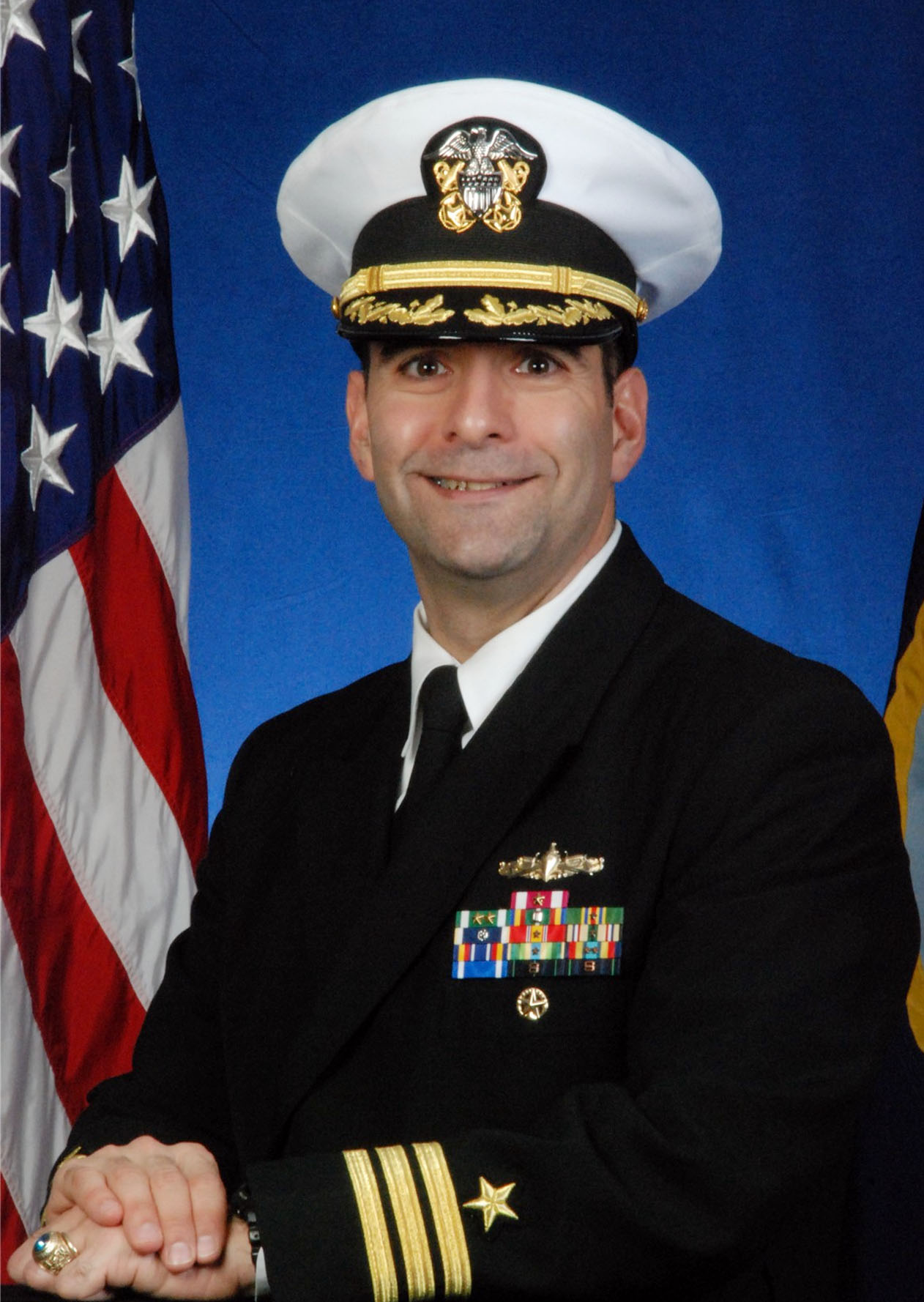
- Castellano during his tenure as a commander.
- Born: Francis Xavier Castellano; January 7, 1964 (age 62); Patchogue, New York, U.S.
- Military career
- Allegiance: United States
- Branch: United States Navy
- Service years: 1990–Present
- Rank: Captain
- Commands: USS Chinook; USS Bainbridge (June 2008 – April 2010); USS Vella Gulf
- Conflicts: Maersk Alabama hijacking
- Awards: Defense Meritorious Service Medal; Meritorious Service Medal (four awards); Navy Commendation Medal (three awards)

Francis Xavier Castellano (born January 7, 1964) is a United States Navy captain currently assigned as the commanding officer of Center for Surface Combat Systems. He was the commander of the guided missile destroyer USS Bainbridge during the hijacking of MV Maersk Alabama.

Captain Castellano was listed as executive officer of USS Vella Gulf on May 5, 2014, during a Holocaust memorial ceremony in Haifa, Israel. He was executive officer of Vella Gulf from December 2013 to April 2015 and was commanding officer from April 2015 to September 2015.

== Early life and education ==
Castellano graduated from the United States Naval Academy in 1990, earning a Bachelor of Science Degree in History. He has attended the Naval Postgraduate School, earning a Master Of Science Degree in Systems Technology (Joint Command, Control, Communications, Computers, and Intelligence), and the United States Naval War College, earning Master of Arts in National Security and Strategic Studies.

== Career ==
Castellano's naval sea duty assignments include O.I. Division Officer, Auxiliaries Officer, and Communications Officer of USS Anzio; Operations Officer of USS Cole; Commanding Officer of USS Chinook; as Executive Officer of USS Donald Cook and as Commanding Officer of USS Bainbridge from June 2008 until April 2010. Ashore, he served as an Associate Fellow to the Chief of Naval Operations Strategic Studies Group XVI and as a Surface Warfare Lieutenant Commander – Commander Assignments Officer, Navy Personnel Command (PERS 41). He was also previously assigned to the Joint Forces Staff College.

=== Maersk Alabama hijacking ===
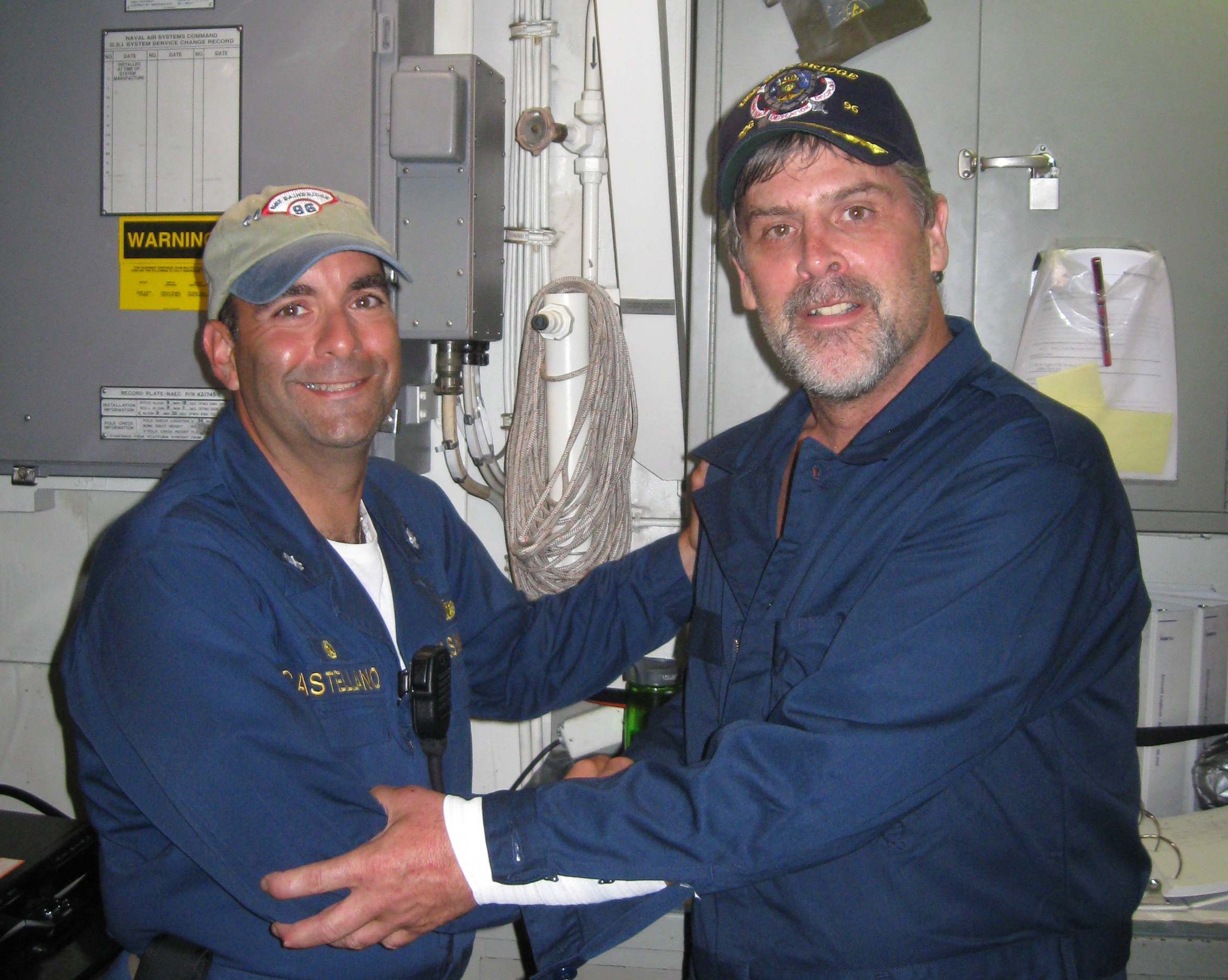
Castellano with Captain Phillips after the latter's rescue from pirates in April 2009.

Castellano was the commanding officer of Bainbridge during the April 12, 2009, rescue of Captain Richard Phillips from pirates off the coast of Somalia. On April 12, 2009, Phillips was rescued from his pirate captors.

According to Kirk Lippold, former commander of USS Cole and superior officer to Castellano at that time, in a statement about Castellano in the hours prior to the rescue, "He – Frank is absolutely rock solid. He is a very, very mature and experienced commanding officer. He's had command previously of one of our navy's patrol craft. So with him being on Bainbridge, I have absolute confidence that he's in the right place at the right time for a reason and that he'll do a great job there."

Castellano stated that as the winds picked up, tensions rose among the pirates and "we calmed them" and persuaded the pirates to be towed by Bainbridge. Vice Admiral William E. Gortney reported the rescue began when Castellano determined that Phillips's life was in imminent danger and ordered the action. President Barack Obama had previously given orders to take no action unless it was determined that Phillips's life was in immediate danger.

A reporter summarized Vice Admiral William Gortney's description of the final events: "Just before the shooting, Capt. Phillips was topside of the lifeboat. One pirate was behind him, pointing an AK-47 rifle at him. The head and shoulders of each of the other two pirates were also visible above deck of the enclosed lifeboat. Determining that Phillips might be shot at any moment, the commander ordered the action." Castellano stated, "[We] ultimately believed the pirates were about to kill the captain. That's what was the decision point."

U.S. Navy SEAL snipers on Bainbridge's fantail opened fire and killed the three pirates remaining in the lifeboat. Bainbridge had the lifeboat under tow approximately 25 m (82 ft) astern at the time. A fourth pirate was aboard Bainbridge negotiating a ransom and was taken prisoner. The U.S. Navy evacuated Maersk Alabama's captain, Richard Phillips, to Bainbridge and then flew him by helicopter to USS Boxer for a medical evaluation.

== Awards and decorations ==
- Surface Warfare Officer Insignia
- Defense Meritorious Service Medal
- Meritorious Service Medal (4)
- Joint Service Commendation Medal
- Navy and Marine Corps Commendation Medal (3)

== Personal life ==
Castellano is a Roman Catholic. At his parish of Our Lady of Mount Carmel Catholic Church in Patchogue, he served in turn as an altar boy, usher, lector, and Extraordinary Minister of Holy Communion. Castellano is a member of the Knights of Columbus Patchogue, N.Y., Council 725.

== In popular culture ==
- Castellano is portrayed by actor Yul Vazquez in the 2013 film, Captain Phillips.
