= Maersk Alabama hijacking =

2009 piracy incident

- Part of Operation Ocean Shield
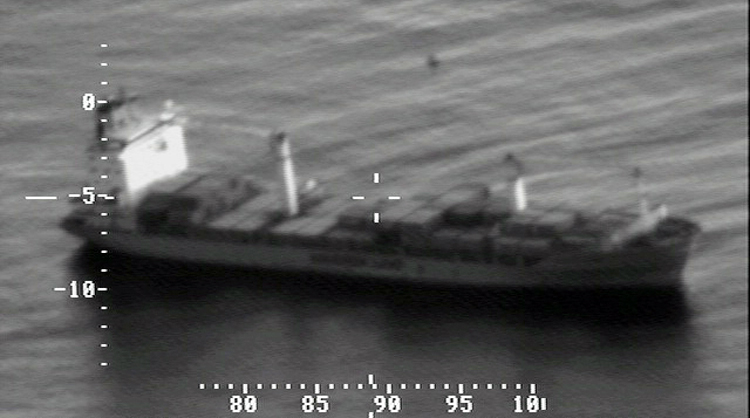
- Aerial surveillance of Maersk Alabama on 9 April
Date	8–12 April 2009; 17 years ago
Location	240 nmi (440 km; 280 mi) off Somalia
Result	All hostages rescued 3 pirates killed, 1 pirate captured

Belligerents
MV Maersk Alabama; Supported by: United States Navy	Somali pirates

Commanders and leaders
United States Navy Richard Phillips	Abduwali Muse

Strength
23 crew	4 hijackers

Casualties and losses
None	3 killed; 1 captured

On April 8th, 2009, four pirates in the Somali Basin seized the Danish/U.S. cargo ship Maersk Alabama at a distance of 240 nautical miles (440 km; 280 mi) southeast of Eyl, Somalia. The siege ended after a rescue effort by the United States Navy on 12 April. At the time of the hijacking, Maersk Alabama was owned by the Danish shipping company Maersk Line. The ship has since been acquired by Element Shipmanagement SA and has been renamed MV Tygra. As of 2025, the ship is still in active service.

The incident was the first successful pirate seizure of a ship registered under the U.S. flag since the early 19th century. Many news reports cited the last pirate seizure as being during the Second Barbary War in 1815, although other incidents are believed to have occurred until at least 1822. It was the sixth vessel in a week to be attacked by pirates, who had previously extorted ransoms of tens of millions of dollars. The story of the incident was reported by Captain Richard Phillips, who had been master of the vessel at the time of the incident, in the 2010 book A Captain's Duty, which he co-wrote with Stephan Talty. The book was later adapted as the U.S. 2013 film Captain Phillips, starring Tom Hanks.

== Background ==
With a crew of 23 and 17,000 metric tons (19,000 short tons) of cargo, the Maersk Alabama, originating from Salalah, Oman, was bound for Mombasa, Kenya, after a stop in Djibouti. The ship was carrying 401 containers of food aid from USAID, Serving God Ministries, the World Food Programme, and Catholic Relief Services. The food aid was destined for people in Somalia and Uganda, Somali refugees in Kenya, and refugees in Rwanda.

The crew of Maersk Alabama had received anti-piracy training from union training schools and had drilled aboard the ship a day prior to the attack. Their training included the use of small arms, anti-terror, basic safety, first aid, and other security-related courses.

== Events ==
=== Hijacking ===
On 8 April 2009, four pirates based on FV Win Far 161 attacked the ship armed with AK-47 assault rifles. The pirates were all between 15 and 18 years old, according to Secretary of Defense Robert Gates. When the pirate alarm sounded, Chief Engineer Mike Perry brought 14 members of the crew into a secure room that the engineers had been fortifying for such a purpose. As the pirates approached, the remaining crew fired flares. Perry and First Assistant Engineer Matt Fisher swung the ship's rudder, which swamped the pirate skiff.

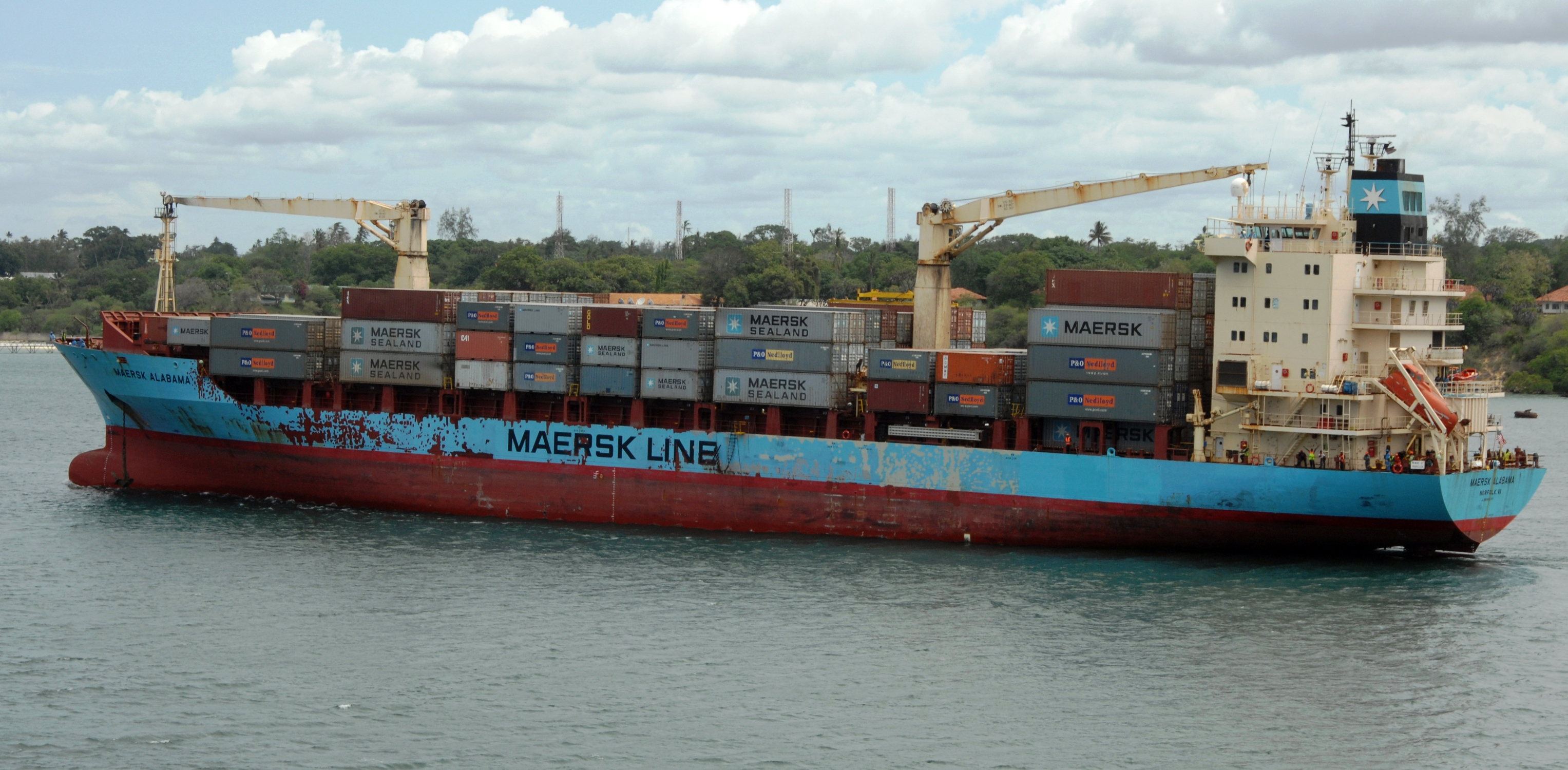
Maersk Alabama in 2009, shortly after the hijacking

The ship was boarded. Perry had taken main engine control away from the bridge and Fisher had taken control of the steering gear. Perry then shut down all ship systems and the entire vessel "went black". The pirates captured Captain Richard Phillips and several other crew members minutes after boarding, but found that they could not control the ship.

Perry, armed with a knife, remained outside the secure room lying in wait for the pirates who were trying to locate the missing crew members in order to gain control of the ship. Perry tackled their ringleader, Abduwali Muse, and took him prisoner after a cat-and-mouse chase in a darkened engine room. Muse, whose hand was cut during the altercation, was then tied up and his wounds treated by Second Mate Ken Quinn.

After suffering in the overheated secure room for hours, the crew attempted to exchange Muse for Phillips, but the exchange went awry and the pirates did not release Phillips after Muse was released. When Phillips escorted the pirates to a lifeboat to show them how to operate it, the pirates fled in the lifeboat with Phillips hostage and $30,000 cash from the Maersk Alabama's safe.

=== Hostage situation ===
On 8 April, the United States Navy guided-missile destroyer USS Bainbridge and the guided-missile frigate USS Halyburton were dispatched to the Gulf of Aden in response to the hostage situation, Halyburton carrying two SH-60B Seahawk helicopters. The ships reached Maersk Alabama early on 9 April. Maersk Alabama was then escorted to its original destination of Mombasa, where Captain Larry D. Aasheim took command. Phillips had relieved Aasheim nine days earlier.

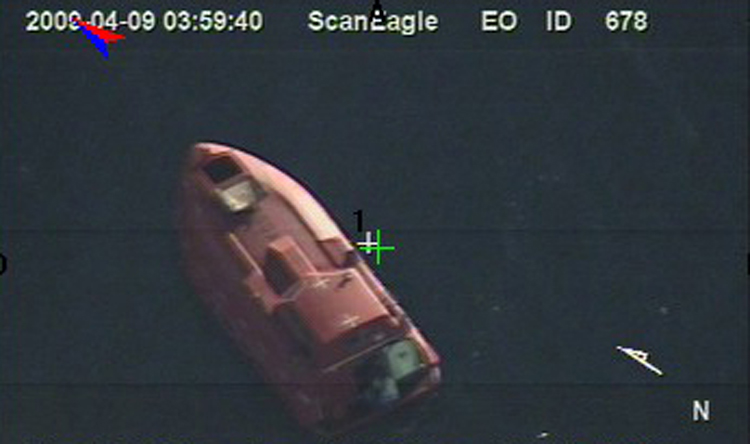
The 28-foot (9 m) lifeboat

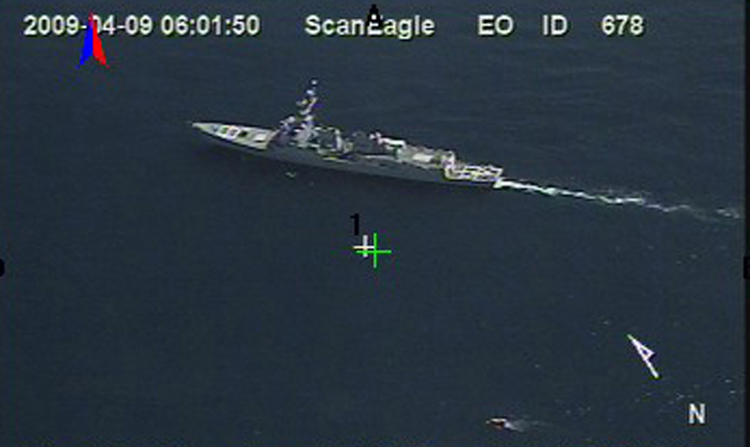
USS Bainbridge shadows the lifeboat

A stand-off began on 9 April between Bainbridge, Halyburton, and the pirates holding Phillips on the Maersk Alabama lifeboat. The lifeboat was covered and contained food and water but lacked a toilet or ventilation. Bainbridge was equipped with a ScanEagle unmanned aerial vehicle and rigid-hulled inflatable boats. Both vessels stayed several hundred yards away, out of the pirates' range of fire. A P-3C Orion surveillance aircraft secured aerial footage and reconnaissance. Radio communication was established. Four hijacked vessels headed towards the scene carrying 54 hostages: citizens of China, Germany, Russia, the Philippines, Tuvalu, Indonesia, and Taiwan.

On 10 April, Phillips apparently attempted to escape the lifeboat but was recaptured after the captors fired shots. The pirates threw the phone and two-way radio dropped to them by the U.S. Navy into the ocean, fearing the Americans were using the equipment to give instructions to Phillips. The U.S. Navy dispatched an amphibious assault ship, USS Boxer, off the Horn of Africa to the site. The pirates' strategy was to await the arrival of additional pirates aboard hijacked vessels with additional hostages as human shields, and to get Phillips to Somalia where they could hide him and make a rescue more difficult. Anchoring near shore would allow them to land quickly if attacked. Negotiations were ongoing between the pirates and Commander Frank Castellano of the Bainbridge and FBI hostage negotiators. The captors were also communicating with other pirate vessels by satellite phone.

Negotiations broke down after a pirate fired on Halyburton not long after sunrise on Saturday, 11 April. Halyburton did not return fire and "did not want to escalate the situation". There were no injuries as the shots were fired haphazardly from the front hatch of the lifeboat. A pirate told Reuters by satellite phone: "We are safe and we are not afraid of the Americans. We will defend ourselves if attacked". Phillips' family gathered at his farmhouse in Vermont. Maersk Alabama arrived in Mombasa under U.S. military escort and was secured as a crime scene by the FBI. Castellano stated that as the winds picked up, tensions rose among the pirates and "we calmed them" and persuaded them to be towed by the destroyer.

=== Rescue ===
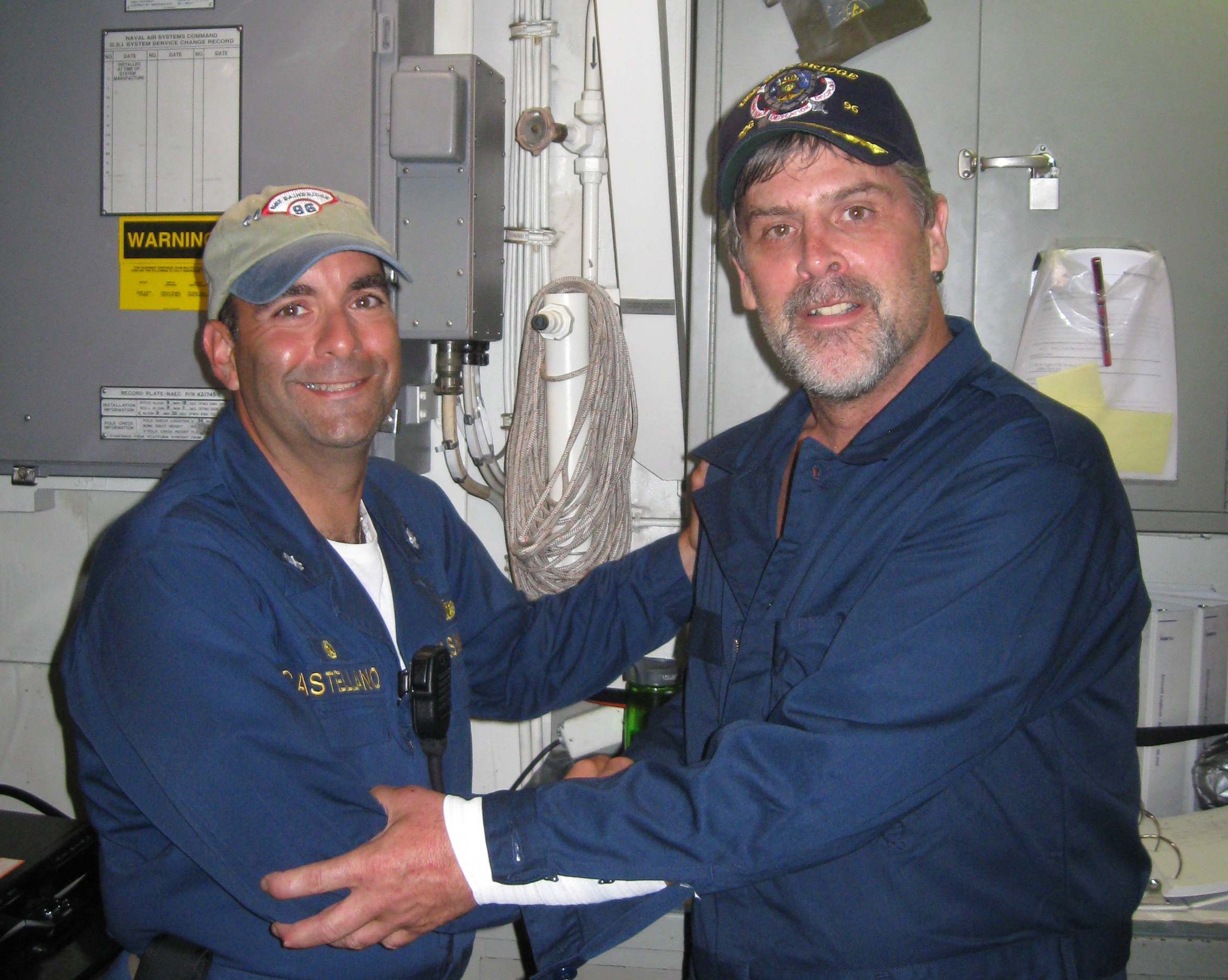
Richard Phillips (right) with Commander Frank Castellano of USS Bainbridge

On Sunday, 12 April, two US Navy SEAL Team Six snipers of Red Squadron and one USAF CCT from the 24th STS fired shots from Bainbridge's fantail, killing the three remaining pirates after Muse had boarded the Bainbridge to negotiate a deal. Captain Phillips was rescued uninjured. Commander Castellano, with prior authorization, ordered the action after determining Phillips' life was in immediate danger, citing reports that a pirate was pointing a rifle at Phillips' back.

The $30,000 cash from the Maersk Alabama that the pirates had stowed in the lifeboat was not found. The NCIS and the FBI investigated two members of the SEAL team's Red Squadron, but no charges were brought.

One of the pirates killed was Ali Aden Elmi, the last name of another was Hamac, and the third has not been identified in English-language press. The film based on Phillips' book names the three Walid Elmi, Nour Najee, and Adan Bilal. Their bodies were later turned over by the U.S. Navy to unidentified recipients in Somalia.

Two former Navy SEALs have claimed participation in the rescue: Matt Bissonnette and Robert J. O'Neill. Both also participated in Operation Neptune Spear that killed Osama bin Laden.

== Aftermath ==
=== Trial ===
Abduwali Muse was held in USS Boxer's brig then flown to the United States to stand trial. Prosecutors in a federal courtroom in New York City brought charges that included piracy, conspiracy to seize a ship by force, and conspiracy to commit hostage-taking.

Muse's lawyers asked that he be tried as a juvenile, saying that he was 15 or 16 years old at the time of the hostage-taking, but the court ruled that Muse was an adult and would be tried as such. He later admitted that he was 18 years old, and pleaded guilty to hijacking, kidnapping, and hostage-taking in lieu of piracy charges. He was sentenced to 33 years and 9 months prison.

=== Lawsuit ===
In 2009, 11 of the 20 former crew members of the Maersk Alabama sued the ship's owner, Maersk Line Limited, and operator, Waterman Steamship Corporation, for knowingly and intentionally sending the ship into pirate-infested waters near Somalia. Despite warnings to stay at least 600 nautical miles away from the coast due to pirate activity, Phillips had moved the ship within 250 nautical miles of the coast, which the crew members said put their lives in jeopardy, and claimed that the companies did not provide adequate security. The lawsuit was settled out of court for an undisclosed sum.

== Mass media ==
Talent agency Creative Artists Agency (CAA) signed Phillips and auctioned his life rights to the publishing and film industries.

=== Book ===
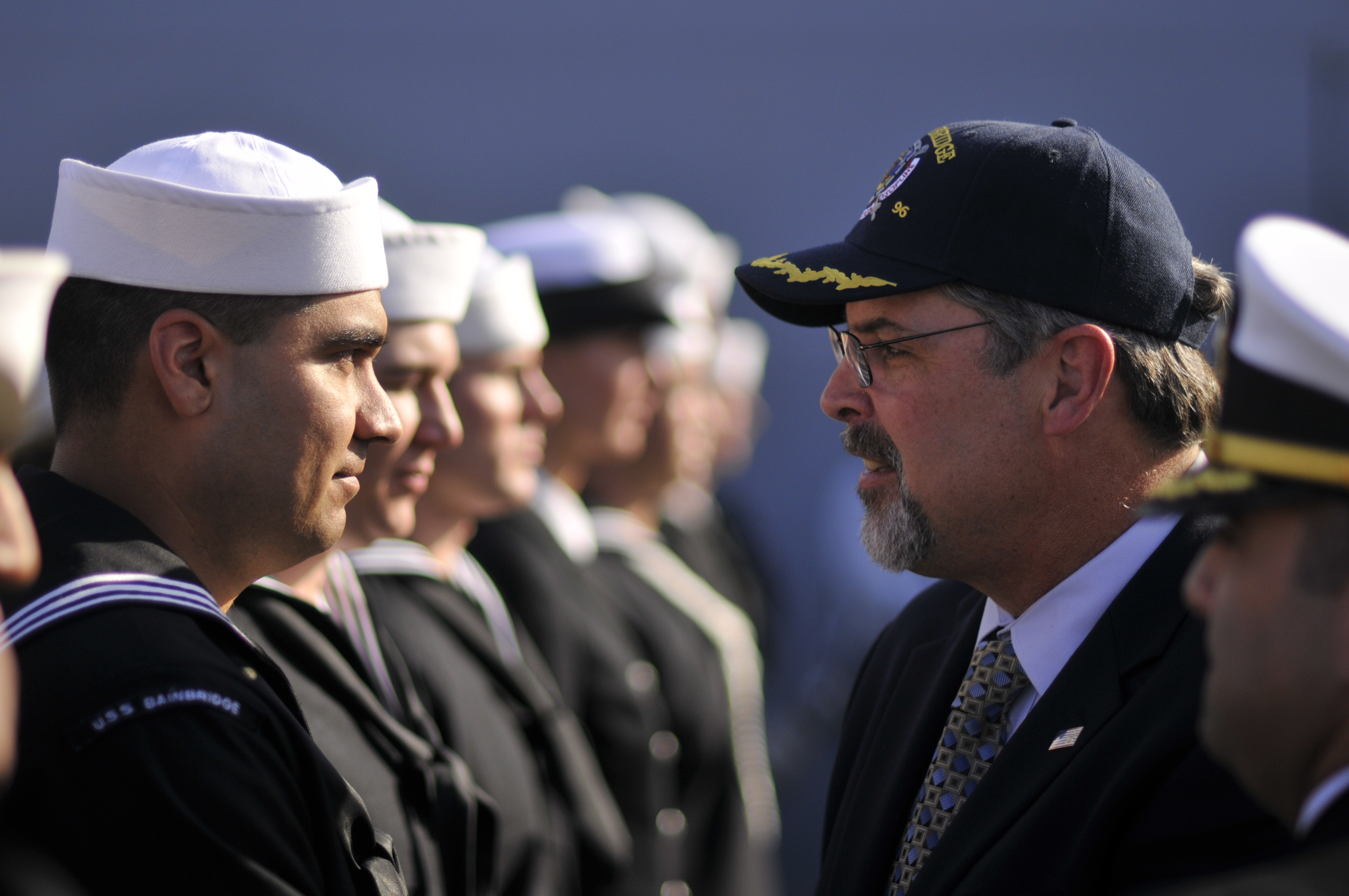
Phillips publicly thanks sailors for his dramatic rescue at sea.

Hyperion Books optioned the rights for Phillips' memoir in May 2009. A Captain's Duty: Somali Pirates, Navy SEALS, and Dangerous Days at Sea was released on 6 April 2010.

=== Film ===
Columbia Pictures acquired the film rights in May 2009. In March 2011, it was announced Tom Hanks would star as Phillips, Barkhad Abdi as Abduwali Muse, and Faysal Ahmed as Nour Najee in a film based on the hijacking and Phillips' book. The film was scripted by Billy Ray.

The film Captain Phillips was released on 11 October 2013 and had its premiere at the 2013 New York Film Festival. It was praised for its direction, screenplay, production values, cinematography, and for the performances of Hanks and Abdi, with Abdi winning a Bafta award for Best Supporting Actor. Captain Phillips grossed $107.1 million in North America and $111.7 million in other countries for a worldwide total of $218.8 million, against its budget of $55 million.

== Legacy ==
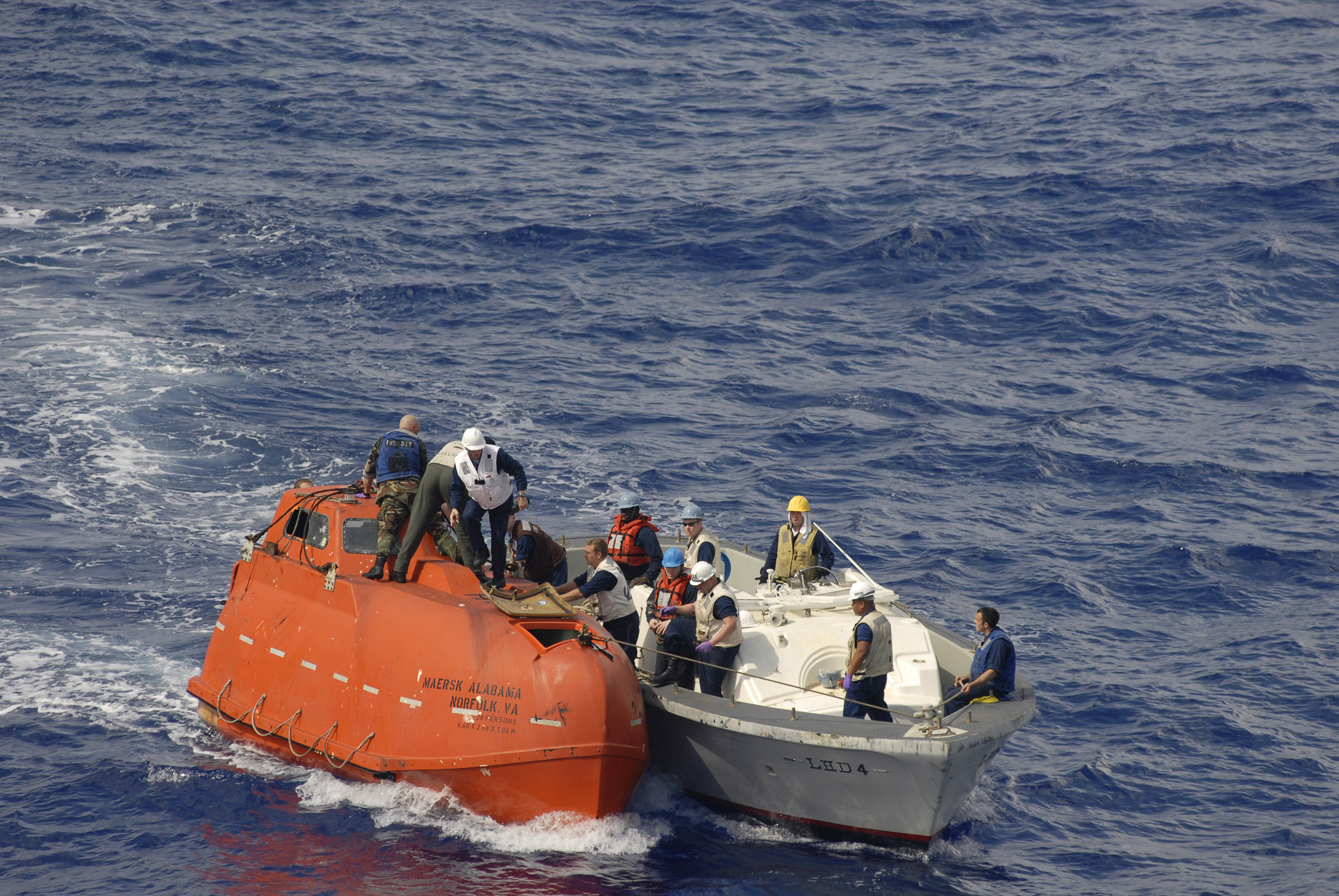
Phillips leaving the lifeboat

The owners of Maersk Alabama donated the bullet-marked 5-ton fiberglass lifeboat to the National Navy UDT-SEAL Museum in Fort Pierce, Florida, in August 2009; prior to which the lifeboat had been on loan to National Geographic for its "Real Pirates" exhibition at the Nauticus marine science museum in Norfolk, Virginia.

The producers of the Captain Phillips film visited the Museum while re-creating the lifeboat and interiors for the set. An example of the Boeing Insitu ScanEagle used to monitor the crisis is also on display. The actual ScanEagle used in the mission is on display at the Museum of Flight in Seattle.

== See also ==
- Dai Hong Dan incident – 2007 ship hijacking in the Indian Ocean
- List of ships attacked by Somali pirates
- Piracy off the coast of Somalia – Hijacking of ships by Somali pirates
