= Abduwali Muse =

Somali pirate (born 1990)

- عبد الولي موسى; Cabdiweli Muuse
- Born: Between 1990 (age 35–36) and 1993 (age 32–33); Galkayo District, Somalia
- Other names: Abdulwali Abdukhad Muse; Abdiwali Abdiqadir Muse; Abduwali Abdukhadir Musé; Abdul Wali Muse; Cabdiweli Muusa; Abduhl Wal-i-Musi
- Known for: Maersk Alabama hijacking
- Status: Incarcerated at Federal Correctional Institution, Cumberland
- Convictions: Hijacking x2 Kidnapping x2 Hostage taking x2

Abduwali Abdukhadir Muse (Note: /ˌɑːbdʊˈwɑːli ˌɑːbdʊlˈkɑːdɪər ˈmuːsə/; Somali: عبد الوالي عبد القادر موسى, Cabdiwali Cabdiqadir Muuse, pronounced [ʕàbd̪ìwélì ʕàbd̪ìqáːd̪ìr múːsè]) is a Somali pirate. He is the sole survivor of four pirates who hijacked the MV Maersk Alabama in April 2009 and then held Captain Richard Phillips for ransom. On 16 February 2011, Muse was convicted and sentenced to 33 years and 9 months in U.S. federal prison.

Muse was portrayed by Somali-American actor Barkhad Abdi in the 2013 film Captain Phillips, a dramatization of the hijacking.

== Early life ==
Muse was born as the eldest of twelve children in a village north of Galkayo, a divided city. Muse's parents were herders, keeping camels, cows, and goats, and selling their milk for a living. He grew up in poverty often without food or clothes, with later medical examination attesting to severe childhood malnutrition. At a young age, he was kicked in the face by a camel and lost two of his front teeth. Muse began living alone at age 11 or 12 and initially worked as an assistant to taxi drivers, sustaining severe injuries during this time after being trampled by cows. At age 13, he moved to Garacad, at the time known as a hub for piracy, where he worked as a cook for fishermen. He was married in 2008 but could not afford to establish a home for himself and his wife. Naval historian David F. Marley wrote that Muse was likely recruited through a member of his clan to act as a gunman under pirate chief Abdi Garad in Eyl.

== Attack on Maersk Alabama ==
According to his indictment, Muse was the first of the four men who boarded Maersk Alabama. During the attack, the pirates searched the ship to account for all the crew. While one pirate took the ship's captain Richard Phillips to a different part of the vessel, Muse and his remaining compatriots lost sight of third mate Collin Wright. The two other pirates opened fire on two crew members they found, but Muse ordered them to stop, after which one of the men, helmsman Abu Tasir Mohammed "Zahid" Reza, volunteered to look for the rest of the crew, appealing to their shared religious beliefs. Muse agreed and gave his weapon to another pirate, as they did not want to risk losing a firearm to the crewmen in case of an ambush. Below deck, Muse was attacked by chief engineer Mike Perry, who, together with Reza, wrestled Muse to the ground, with Perry stabbing Muse in the back of the neck while Reza stabbed him in the hand. The crew held Muse hostage for five hours, with Muse telling Reza that the pirates sought a $3,000,000 ransom.

Ultimately, Richard Phillips offered Muse and the other pirates $30,000 to leave Maersk Alabama safely on the ship's lifeboat. However, Muse climbed onto the lifeboat prematurely before Phillips could be returned. Phillips told Maersk Alabama's crew that he would show the pirates how to operate the controls, but remained a hostage as the lifeboat was steered away from the freighter. Muse tried to establish contact with other nearby pirate vessels through a satellite phone, but a day later, on 9 April, USS Bainbridge intercepted the lifeboat. Over the next three days, Navy officers negotiated with the armed pirates and on 12 April the US Navy agreed to take Muse on board Bainbridge for medical treatment and to "meet" with elders from his clan to negotiate the release of Phillips. After Muse had been taken on board, the three remaining pirates were shot dead simultaneously by Navy SEAL snipers.

Muse was taken into custody by United States authorities and brought to New York City. Muse was to stand trial in New York because of the local FBI office's expertise in handling cases where major crimes were perpetrated against Americans in Africa, such as the 1998 United States embassy bombings in Kenya and Tanzania. CBC News also reported that U.S. authorities had considered transferring him to authorities in Kenya per international agreement to prosecute pirate suspects. While in isolation at the Manhattan Detention Complex, Muse was diagnosed with depression and post-traumatic stress disorder, as well as recorded for several suicide attempts.

=== Age dispute ===
There was some confusion as to his age. No birth record of Muse exists as his mother gave birth at home through a midwife. According to the New York Daily News, he was at the time 17 to 19 years old. When initially captured, U.S. officials reported Muse as being 16 to 20 years old, and that his name was Abduhl Wali-i-Musi. U.S. secretary of defense Robert Gates asserted that all four pirate suspects were between the ages of 17 and 19.

Muse's mother, Adar Abdurahman Hassan, stated in a telephone interview with the Associated Press that U.S. authorities had both his name and age wrong. She indicated that Muse was 16 years old, named him as Abdi Wali Abdulqadir Muse, and stated that he had gone missing after heading for school 15 days before the hijacking. Muse's father, Abdiqadir Muse Gedi, gave his son's birthdate as 20 November 1993, which would have made him 15 at the time of the hijacking. In an interview with the BBC Somali service, Muse's mother also appealed to the U.S. government and president to free her son, asserting that Muse had been lured into pirate activity by "gangsters with money". She claimed that he had only been involved in piracy for 15 days, while the U.S. judiciary determined that Muse had led piracy activities for five weeks before targeting the Maersk Alabama.

On 20 April 2009, CBC News reported that U.S. officials indicated that investigators had confirmed Muse was over 18, which removed additional steps that would be required to prosecute him had it been determined that he was a minor. According to court testimony by NYPD detective Frederick Galloway, Muse admitted that he was "between 18 and 19" during questioning. While Muse's prison profile listed him as 21 in 2011, his age remained disputed following his trial.

== Legal process ==
Muse was tried in the United States District Court for the Southern District of New York. On 21 April 2009, U.S. Magistrate Judge Andrew J. Peck decided Muse was not under 18 and that he could be tried as an adult. He faced charges including piracy under the law of nations, conspiracy to seize a ship by force, conspiracy to commit hostage-taking, and firearms related charges, carrying a potential of up to four life sentences. The charge of piracy has a mandatory life sentence (18 USC 1651), and there is no parole in U.S. federal prisons.

On 19 May 2009, a federal grand jury in New York returned a ten-count indictment against Muse. Muse was charged and taken into American custody. Muse was thought to be the first person to be charged with piracy in an American court, under Title 18 United States Code § 1651, in more than 100 years, when courts ruled in 1885 that Ambrose Light was not a pirate vessel. A 2008 case, United States v. Shi, in which a Chinese sailor killed two crewmates and forced others aboard to steer the ship, was quoted in Muse's indictment, having also been charged and ultimately convicted of seizing a foreign vessel in violation of 18 United States Code § 2280.

=== Additional attacks ===
In January 2010, Muse was charged in connection with two additional attacks on international shipping. The indictment does not name the two vessels involved, hijacked in March and April 2009. However, they are likely to include the 700-ton fishing vessel Win Far 161, which was used as a mother ship in other attacks, including the Maersk Alabama hijacking. Two of the Win Far 161's crew, one sailor from mainland China and the other from Indonesia, died of illness.

=== Trial and sentencing ===
Muse pleaded guilty to the hijacking, kidnapping and hostage-taking charges on 18 May 2010. Charges of piracy, punishable by a mandatory life sentence, and possession of a machine gun were dropped in exchange for the guilty plea for a sentence between 27 and 33 years.

On 16 February 2011, Muse was sentenced to 33 years and 9 months in federal prison, followed by five years of supervised release and ordered him to pay $550,000 in restitution.

== Imprisonment ==
Muse was initially incarcerated at the Federal Correctional Institution, Terre Haute, in the Communications Management Unit. He was temporarily moved to the Federal Correctional Institution, Edgefield before being transferred back to Terre Haute. As of December 2025, Muse is incarcerated at Federal Correctional Institution, Cumberland. His projected release date is 30 May 2038.

In March 2011, Muse was put in solitary confinement and had his communication privileges limited. According to Terre Haute staff, a man who had recently been taken hostage and released by Somali pirates claimed that one of his captors spoke about how Muse tasked them with killing the captain of the Win Far 161, which Muse reportedly hijacked before the Maersk Alabama. Prison authorities stated that two phone calls made by Muse in summer of 2009 while in pre-trial detention matched the former hostage's claims, though Muse's legal defense stated that the calls were "misinterpreted".

Muse worked as a prison orderly, although his wage was garnished to pay the restitution he owes for the hijacking as well as a court fee. He said he spent his free time in prison watching TV, reading and writing. While in Terre Haute he received his first English lesson from Mufid Abdulqader who had been sentenced to 20 years in prison after the Holy Land Foundation trial. Canadian-based Mosotho filmmaker Kaizer Matsumunyane planned to make a documentary about Muse, titled The Smiling Pirate, which was in pre-production with a release year of 2018. According to The Daily Beast, the project "stalled" in 2013, though Muse and Matsumunyane maintained contact until 2016. Also in 2016, Mutsumunyane stated that Muse had obtained a GED.

In February 2016, an appeal by Muse was denied by the 7th U.S. Circuit Court of Appeals, as the 2010 plea deal included that he could not forfeit his guilty plea. Muse argued that he felt pressured into giving an adult age by investigators, also noting that he spoke no English at the time, with his appointed interpreter lacking fluency in Muse's particular Somali dialect. In 2017, Muse filed a lawsuit against three staff members of the Terre Haute facility, holding them responsible for the loss of 15 teeth, seven of which were extracted in 2011, through "deliberate indifference".

== In popular culture ==
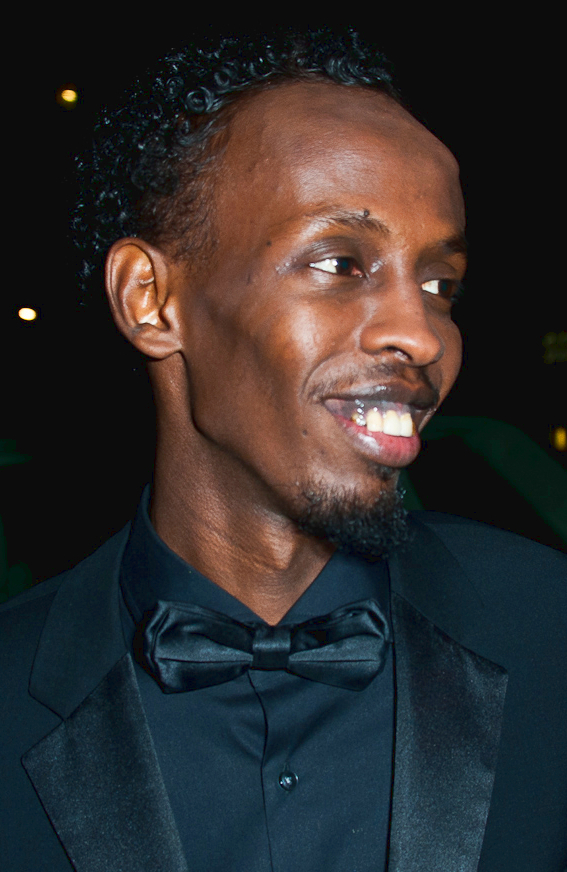
Barkhad Abdi portrayed Muse in Captain Phillips

Muse was portrayed by Somali-American actor Barkhad Abdi in the 2013 film Captain Phillips, a dramatization of the events in 2009, also starring Tom Hanks as the titular Richard Phillips. The film received a nomination for Best Picture, and Abdi was nominated for the Academy Award for Best Supporting Actor for his portrayal of Muse.
