= Richard Phillips (merchant mariner) =

American merchant mariner and author

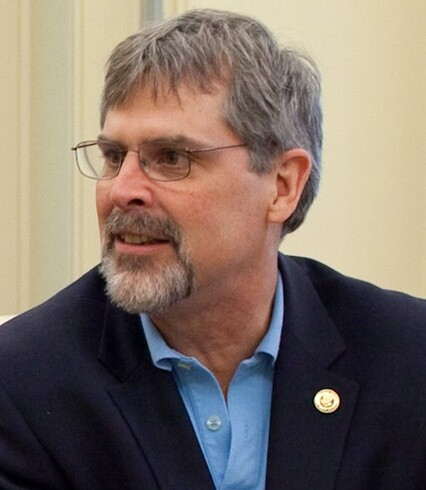
- Phillips in 2010
- Born: May 16, 1955 (age 71); Winchester, Massachusetts, U.S.
- Education: Massachusetts Maritime Academy
- Occupation: Merchant mariner
- Spouse: Andrea Phillips
- Children: 2

Richard Phillips (born May 16, 1955) is an American merchant mariner and author who served as captain of the MV Maersk Alabama during its hijacking by Somali pirates in April 2009.

== Early life and education ==
Of Irish descent, Phillips was born in Massachusetts and graduated from Winchester High School in 1973. His father, James Austin Phillips, was a teacher, head basketball coach, and assistant football coach at the high school.

Phillips enrolled at the University of Massachusetts Amherst and planned to study international law, but transferred to the Massachusetts Maritime Academy, from which he graduated in 1979. During his schooling, Phillips worked as a taxi driver in Boston.

== Career ==
=== Maersk Alabama hijacking ===
On April 6, 2009, the U.S. Maritime Administration, following NATO advisories, released a Somalia Gulf of Aden "advisory to mariners" recommending ships to stay at least 600 nautical miles (1,100 km; 690 mi) off Somalia's coast of east Africa. With these advisories in effect, on April 8, 2009, four Somali pirates boarded the Maersk Alabama when it was located around 240 nmi (440 km) southeast of the Somali port city of Eyl. With a crew of 20, the ship had departed from Salalah, Oman, en route to Mombasa, Kenya. The ship was carrying 17,000 metric tons of cargo, of which 5,000 metric tons were relief supplies bound for Kenya, Somalia, and Uganda. "In that area of the world, any blip on your radar is of concern," said Phillips, "I always told my crew it was a matter of when, not if."

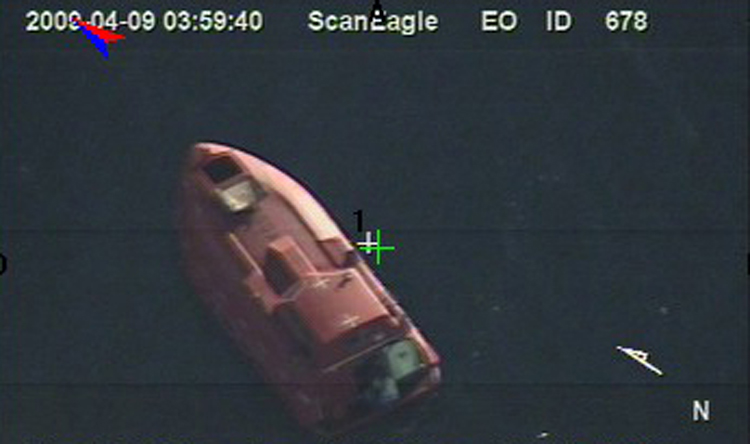
The 28-foot lifeboat where Phillips and the four Somali pirates were held up as seen from a US Navy Boeing ScanEagle UAV.

According to Chief Engineer Mike Perry, the crew sank the pirate speedboat shortly after the boarding by continuously swinging the rudder of the Maersk Alabama, swamping the smaller boat. As the pirates were boarding the ship, the crew members locked themselves in the engine room. The crew later successfully lured one of the pirates, Abduwali Muse, into the engine room and overpowered him, stabbing him in the hand in the process and keeping him tied up for some 12 hours. The crew attempted to exchange the captured Muse for Phillips.

According to a crew member, the pirates got into the ship's rescue boat with the captive Phillips, but it would not start, so the crew dropped a lifeboat and met the pirates to trade prisoners and switch boats. Muse was handed over to his fellow pirates, but the four Somalis then reneged on the exchange and left in the lifeboat, taking Phillips with them. "We returned him, but they didn't return the captain," said second mate Ken Quinn. The lifeboat was carrying ten days of food rations, water, and basic survival supplies.

On April 8, the destroyer USS Bainbridge and the frigate USS Halyburton were dispatched to the Gulf of Aden in response to the hostage situation, and reached Maersk Alabama early on April 9. A standoff began between the Bainbridge and the pirates in the Maersk Alabama lifeboat, where they continued to hold Phillips hostage. Muse agreed to leave the lifeboat to negotiate with Navy officials on board the Bainbridge, leaving his three fellow pirates on the lifeboat with Phillips. Maersk Alabama then departed from the area with an armed escort, towards its original destination of the port of Mombasa. On Saturday, April 11, Maersk Alabama arrived in Mombasa, still under U.S. military escort. Captain Larry Aasheim then assumed command. Aasheim had previously been captain of the Maersk Alabama until Richard Phillips relieved him eight days prior to the pirate attack. An 18-man marine security team was on board. The U.S. Federal Bureau of Investigation secured the ship as a crime scene.

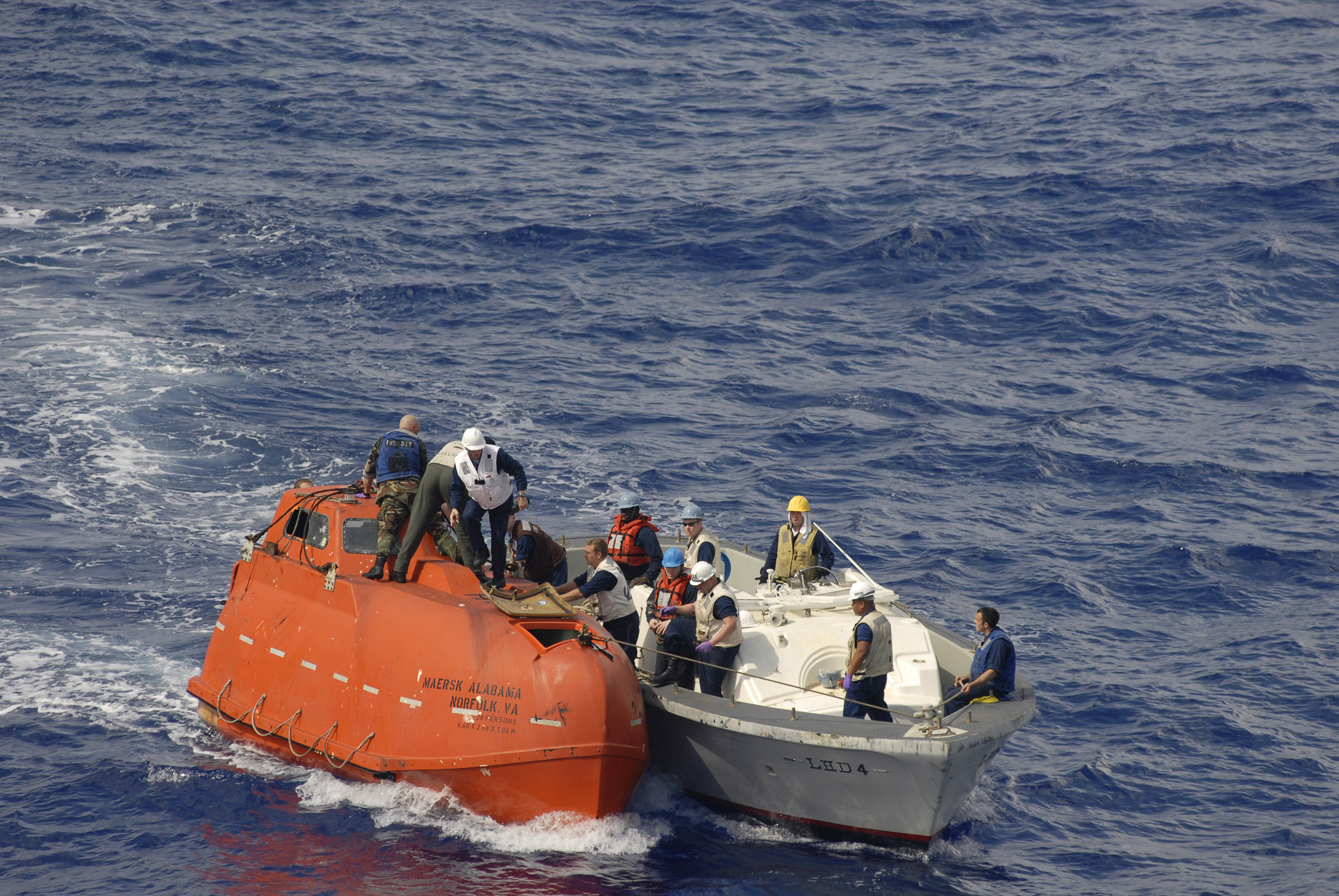
Phillips was held captive in the lifeboat by Somali pirates for five days.

On Sunday, April 12, Bainbridge captain Commander Frank Castellano concluded that Phillips' life was in immediate danger, based on reports that a pirate was pointing an AK-47 at his back.

On Castellano's order, U.S. Navy marksmen from DEVGRU, commonly known as SEAL Team Six, deployed on Bainbridge's fantail, opened fire and killed the three pirates with bullets to the head. Phillips was rescued. One of the pirates was named Ali Aden Elmi, another's last name was Hamac, and the third remains unidentified. Muse was taken into custody aboard the Bainbridge. He later pleaded guilty to hijacking, kidnapping, and hostage-taking charges and was sentenced to over 33 years in federal prison.

Phillips returned to sea fourteen months after the pirate attack, sailing as Master of the vehicle carrier M/V Green Bay until his retirement was announced by the International Organization of Masters, Mates, and Pilots in October 2014, approximately one year after the release of the film Captain Phillips.

== Aftermath ==
Just weeks after his rescue from the Somali pirates, the American talent agency Creative Artists Agency (CAA) signed Phillips, and auctioned off his film rights to the publishing and film industries in the spring of 2009.

=== Book ===
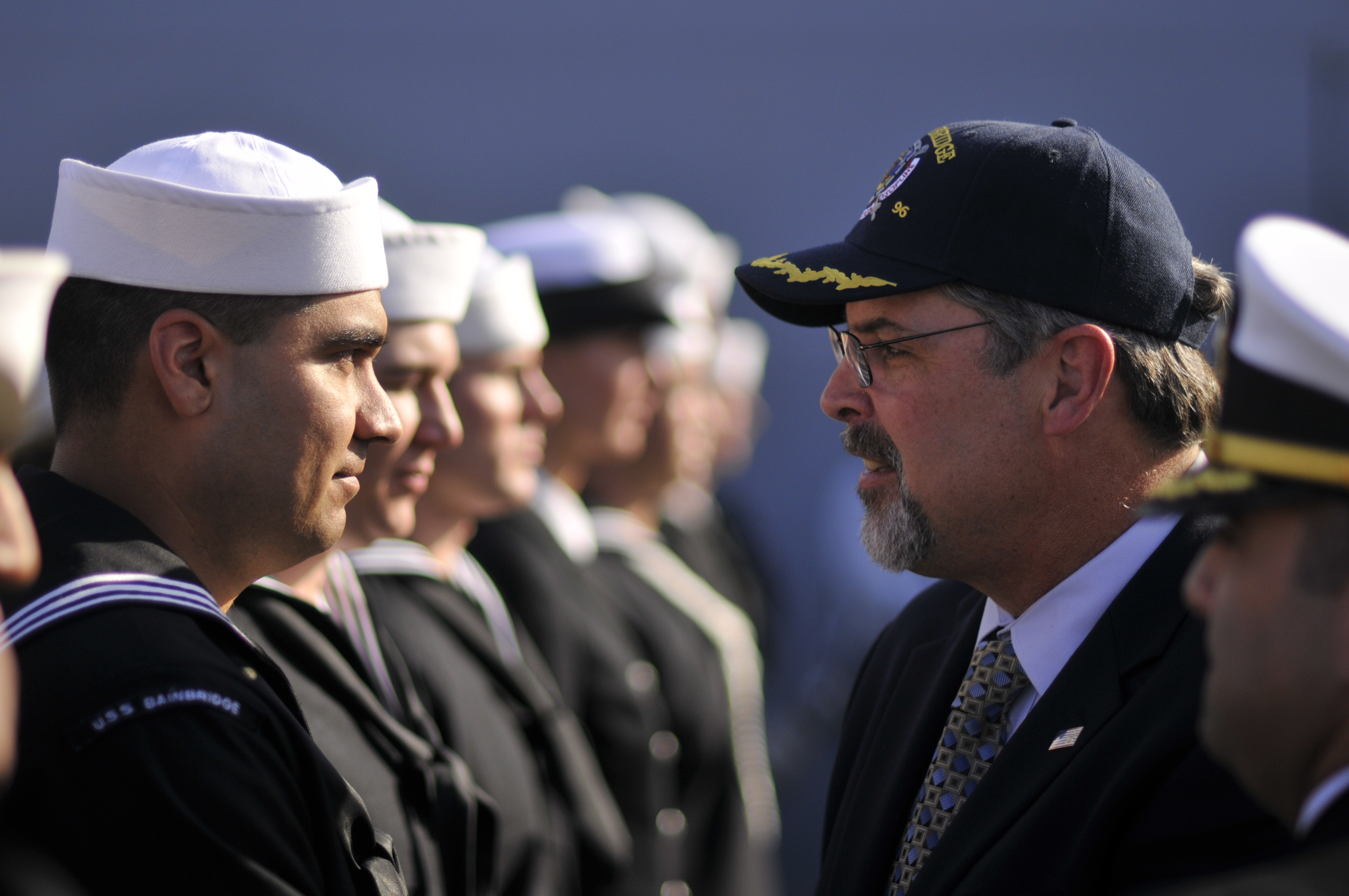
Phillips publicly thanks sailors for his dramatic rescue at sea.

American publisher Hyperion Books optioned the rights for Phillips's memoir in May 2009. On April 6, 2010, A Captain's Duty: Somali Pirates, Navy SEALS, and Dangerous Days at Sea, was released.

=== Film ===
Columbia Pictures acquired the film rights in May 2009 also. In March 2011, it was announced that Tom Hanks would star as Phillips, Barkhad Abdi as Abduwali Muse and Faysal Ahmed as Najee in a film based on the hijacking and Phillips's book. It would be scripted by Billy Ray, and produced by the team behind The Social Network.

The film, titled Captain Phillips, was released on October 11, 2013, and had its premiere showing at the 2013 New York Film Festival. It was praised for its direction, screenplay, production values, cinematography, and for the performances of Tom Hanks and Barkhad Abdi, with Abdi in particular winning a Bafta award for Best Supporting Actor. Captain Phillips grossed $107.1 million in North America and $111.7 million in other countries for a worldwide total of $218.8 million, against its budget of $55 million.

=== Reactions and controversy ===
In an interview on the set of Captain Phillips for New York Daily News, Phillips describes his devotion to his crew, his feeling of success as a captain, and his eagerness to get back to sea. "My crew were now safe, because the pirates lost their ladder and boat when they boarded the Maersk Alabama, so they couldn't get back onboard," says Phillips. "For me it was really a relief—my crew and ship were safe." Phillips also added, "I never lost hope for myself, but I didn't see a good ending coming out of it." Phillips commented in his interview that the rendition of the events is accurate, adding, "When I met [Tom Hanks], I told him if he's going to play me, he's going to have to put on a little weight and get a little better-looking and he did neither."

Since the release of Captain Phillips, there has been controversy over its portrayal of Phillips, with several crew members claiming that he was not the hero presented in the film, according to lawsuits filed by more than half of the crew of the Maersk Alabama. The crew members claim Phillips was at least partly at fault for an "insistence on being fast and making money ... [getting] the Alabama within 250 miles of the Somali coast ...". The lawsuit was reportedly settled before it went to trial.

Phillips told CNN's Drew Griffin in 2010 and in a court deposition in 2013 that he ignored the numerous warnings that urged him to go farther out to sea. When asked in 2013 why he decided not to take the ship farther offshore, Phillips testified, "I don't believe 600 miles would make you safe. I didn't believe 1,200 miles would make you safe. As I told the crew, it would be a matter of when, not if ... We were always in this area." Between 2009 and 2011, pirates from Somalia had attacked ships as far away as 1,000 and even 1,300 nautical miles, although majority of attacks were within 200 nautical miles.

== Bibliography ==
- Richard. Phillips; Stephan Talty (6 April 2010). A Captain's Duty: Somali Pirates, Navy SEALs, and Dangerous Days at Sea. Hyperion. ISBN 978-1-4013-9511-7.
