= Captain Phillips (film) =

2013 film by Paul Greengrass

- Theatrical release poster
- Directed by: Paul Greengrass
- Screenplay by: Billy Ray
- Based on: A Captain's Duty: Somali Pirates, Navy SEALS, and Dangerous Days at Sea by Richard Phillips and Stephan Talty
- Produced by: Scott Rudin; Dana Brunetti; Michael De Luca
- Starring: Tom Hanks; Barkhad Abdi
- Cinematography: Barry Ackroyd
- Edited by: Christopher Rouse
- Music by: Henry Jackman
- Production companies: Columbia Pictures; Scott Rudin Productions; Michael De Luca Productions; Trigger Street Productions
- Distributed by: Sony Pictures Releasing
- Release dates: September 27, 2013 (NYFF); October 11, 2013 (United States)
- Running time: 134 minutes
- Country: United States
- Languages: English; Somali
- Budget: $55 million
- Box office: $220.6 million

Captain Phillips is a 2013 American biographical action-thriller film directed by Paul Greengrass. Based on the 2009 Maersk Alabama hijacking, the film tells the story of Captain Richard Phillips, an American merchant mariner who was taken hostage by Somali pirates. It stars Tom Hanks as Phillips, alongside Barkhad Abdi as pirate leader Abduwali Muse.

The screenplay by Billy Ray is based on Phillips's 2010 book A Captain's Duty: Somali Pirates, Navy SEALs, and Dangerous Days at Sea, which Phillips co-wrote with Stephan Talty. Scott Rudin, Dana Brunetti and Michael De Luca served as producers on the project. It premiered at the 2013 New York Film Festival, and was theatrically released on October 11, 2013. The film was a critical and commercial success, grossing $220.6 million against a budget of $55 million. Captain Phillips received six Academy Award nominations, including Best Picture, Best Adapted Screenplay and Best Supporting Actor for Abdi.

== Plot ==
Richard Phillips takes command of MV Maersk Alabama, an unarmed container vessel from the Port of Salalah in Oman, with orders to sail through the Guardafui Channel to Mombasa, Kenya. Wary of pirate activity off the coast of the Horn of Africa, he and First Officer Shane Murphy order strict security precautions on the vessel. During a practice drill, the captain notices the vessel being followed by Somali pirates in two skiffs. Knowing the pirates are listening to their radio traffic, he pretends to call a warship for help, requesting immediate air support. One skiff turns around in response, and the other – crewed by four armed pirates led by Abduwali Muse – loses engine power trying to steer through Maersk Alabama's wake.

The next day, Muse's skiff returns, now fitted with two outboard engines. Despite the efforts of Phillips and his crew, the four pirates board the ship by ladder. Phillips tells the crew to hide in the engine room, just before the pirates storm the bridge and hold Phillips and the other crew members at gunpoint. Phillips offers Muse the $30,000 in the ship's safe, but Muse's orders are to ransom the ship and crew in exchange for millions of dollars of insurance money from the shipping company. Shane sees that the youngest pirate Bilal does not have sandals and tells the crew to line the engine room hallway with broken glass.

Chief Engineer Mike Perry deactivates the onboard power, plunging the lower decks into darkness. Bilal cuts his feet when they reach the engine room, and Muse continues to search alone. The crew members ambush Muse, holding him at knifepoint, and arrange to release him and the other pirates into a lifeboat. However, Muse's right-hand man Nour Najee refuses to board the lifeboat with Muse unless Phillips goes with them. Once all are on the lifeboat, Najee attacks Phillips, forcing him into the vessel before launching the boat with all five on board.

As the lifeboat heads for Somalia, tensions flare between the pirates as the effects of the plant-based stimulant khat wear off, and they lose contact with their mother ship. Najee, angry, questions Muse's leadership when they are intercepted by the U.S. Navy destroyer USS Bainbridge. Bainbridge's captain Frank Castellano is ordered to prevent the pirates from reaching the Somali coast by any means. Even when additional ships arrive, Muse asserts that he has come too far and will not surrender. The negotiators are unable to change his mind, and a team from DEVGRU parachutes in to intervene. Phillips attempts to escape but is recaptured and beaten by Najee. While three DEVGRU marksmen get into positions, Castellano and DEVGRU continue to try to find a peaceful solution, eventually taking the lifeboat under tow. Muse agrees to board Bainbridge, where he is told that his clan elders are arriving to negotiate Phillips's ransom.

Najee, in control of the lifeboat now, spots Phillips writing a goodbye letter to his wife and snatches it, thinking it to be a Navy trick. Phillips wrestles Najee but Bilal subdues him with his gun butt and Najee beats Phillips. Najee orders Phillips bound and blindfolded, and prepares to shoot him. Bainbridge's crew stops the tow, causing Najee to lose balance, giving the American marksmen clear shots, and they simultaneously kill all three pirates. Muse is arrested and taken into custody. Phillips is rescued and his injuries are treated. In shock and tears, he thanks the rescue team for saving his life.

Title cards state that Phillips reunited with his family shortly afterward, while Muse was convicted of piracy. The following year, Phillips returned to sea.

== Cast ==
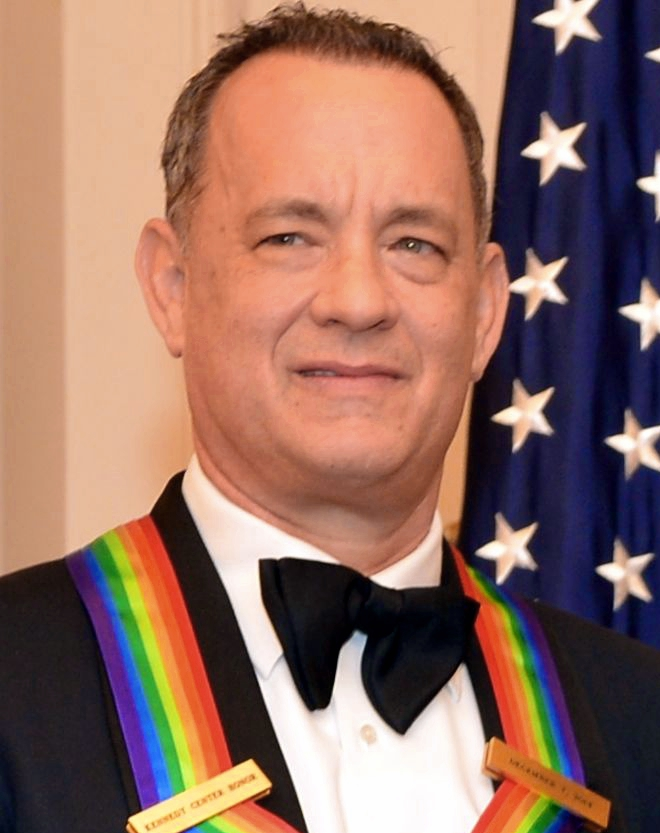
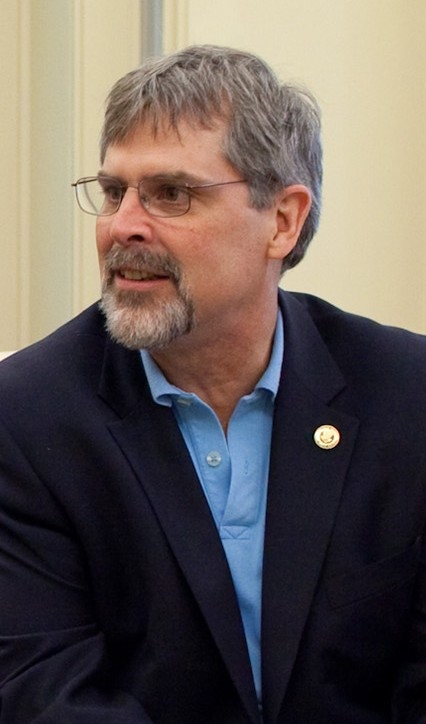
Tom Hanks (left) portrayed Richard Phillips (right).

=== Maersk Alabama crew and allies ===
- Tom Hanks as Richard "Rich" Phillips / "Irish", Captain
- Catherine Keener as Andrea Phillips, Phillips's wife
- Michael Chernus as Shane Murphy, first officer
- David Warshofsky as Mike Perry, chief engineer
- Corey Johnson as Ken Quinn, helmsman
- Chris Mulkey as John Cronan, senior crew member
- Mark Holden as William Rios, boatswain
- Angus MacInnes as Ian Waller, crew member
- Louis Mahoney as Ethan Stoll, crew member
- Vincenzo Nicoli as Andrew Brezinski, crew member
- Maria Dizzia as Allison McColl
- John Magaro as Dan Phillips
- Gigi Raines as Mariah Phillips
- Riann Steele as Bernetti, US Maritime

=== Pirates and allies ===
- Barkhad Abdi as Abduwali Muse, pirate leader
- Barkhad Abdirahman as Adan Bilal
- Faysal Ahmed as Nour Najee
- Mahat M. Ali as Walid Elmi
- Mohamed Ali as Assad
- Ibrahim Maalim as Hufan
- Idurus Shiish as Idurus
- Azeez Mohammed as Dawoud
- Nasir Jamas as Eko

=== US Navy and allies ===
- Yul Vazquez as Commander Frank Castellano, commanding officer, USS Bainbridge
- Max Martini as DEVGRU commander
- Omar Berdouni as Nemo, Somali-language translator working for the U.S. Navy as part of Mission Essential
- Hospital Corpsman Second Class Danielle Albert as Chief Hospital Corpsman O'Brien
- Fire Control Technician First Class (SW) Nathan Cobler as Hospital Corpsman First Class Cobler

== Production ==
=== Development ===
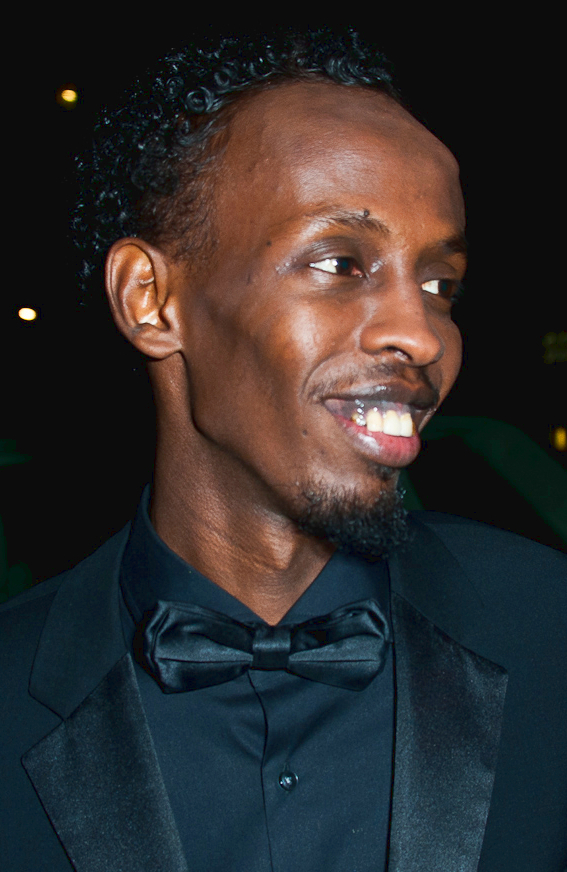
Barkhad Abdi portrayed Abduwali Muse

Columbia Pictures optioned the film rights for Richard Phillips' story in May 2009, just weeks after his rescue from the Somali pirates. A year later in April 2010, Phillips' memoir, A Captain's Duty, was published. In March 2011, actor Tom Hanks attached himself to the project after reading a draft of the screenplay by Billy Ray. Director Paul Greengrass was offered the helm of the untitled film adaptation during the following June.

A worldwide search subsequently began to find the film's supporting Somali cast. From this search, Barkhad Abdi, Barkhad Abdirahman, Faysal Ahmed, and Mahat M. Ali were chosen from among more than 700 participants at a 2011 casting call at the Brian Coyle Community Center in Cedar-Riverside, Minneapolis. The four actors were selected, according to search casting director Debbie DeLisi, because they were "the chosen ones, that anointed group that stuck out."

Producers visited the National Navy UDT-SEAL Museum to see the bullet-scarred, five-ton fiberglass lifeboat aboard which the pirates held Capt. Phillips hostage so that they could accurately re-create the boat and interiors for the set. (Note: The actual lifeboat from Maersk Alabama is now at the SEAL Museum) They were also able to view an example of the Boeing Insitu ScanEagle UAV used to monitor the crisis, as well as the Mark 11 Mod 0 (SR-25) sniper rifle (the type used by the U.S. Navy SEALs), both also on display at the museum.

=== Filming ===
Principal photography for Captain Phillips began on March 26, 2012. Filming took place off the coast of Malta in the Mediterranean Sea. Nine weeks were spent filming aboard Alexander Maersk, a container ship identical to Maersk Alabama. The container vessel was chartered on commercial terms with Maersk Line. USS Truxtun, an Arleigh Burke-class destroyer and sister ship of USS Bainbridge, served as a set piece in the film.

=== Music ===
The film score to Captain Phillips was composed by Henry Jackman. A soundtrack album for the film was released in physical forms on October 15, 2013, by Varèse Sarabande. Additional songs featured in the film include:

- "Up in Here" by KOVAS
- "Hilm B Hilm" by Musa Hanhan
- "Wonderful Tonight" by Eric Clapton
- "The End" by John Powell, a track from Greengrass's 2006 film United 93

== Release ==
=== Theatrical ===
Captain Phillips premiered on September 20, 2013, opening the 2013 New York Film Festival. The film was praised for its direction, screenplay, production values, cinematography, and the performances of Tom Hanks and Barkhad Abdi.

=== Home media ===
Captain Phillips was released on Blu-ray Disc and DVD on January 21, 2014. a 4K SteelBook was released on July 16, 2024.

== Reception ==
=== Box office ===
Captain Phillips grossed $107.1 million in North America and $111.7 million in other countries for a worldwide total of $218.8 million, against its budget of $55 million.

In the United States, the film grossed $25.7 million in its opening weekend, finishing second place at the box office behind Gravity ($43.2 million). It made $16.4 million in its second weekend, remaining in second.

The film was unable to secure a release in China, which caused Sony Pictures to be concerned about the profitability of the film. Based on information revealed in the Sony Pictures hack, the film made a net profit of $39 million, when factoring together all expenses and revenues.

=== Critical response ===
On Rotten Tomatoes, the film has an approval rating of 93% based on 279 reviews. The website's critical consensus reads, "Smart, powerfully acted, and incredibly intense, Captain Phillips offers filmgoers a Hollywood biopic done right — and offers Tom Hanks a showcase for yet another brilliant performance." On Metacritic, the film has a weighted average score of 82 out of 100, based on 48 critics, indicating "universal acclaim". Audiences polled by CinemaScore gave the film an average grade of "A" on an A+ to F scale.

The film was nominated for four Golden Globe Awards, including Best Picture (Drama), Best Actor in a Drama (Hanks), Best Supporting Actor (Abdi) and Best Director (Greengrass). It did not win in any of the categories. The film was also nominated for nine British Academy Film Awards (BAFTAs), including Best Film, Best Direction (Greengrass), Best Actor (Hanks), Best Supporting Actor (Abdi), and Best Adapted Screenplay. Abdi won the film's only award for Best Supporting Actor. The film was also nominated for six Academy Awards – Best Picture, Best Supporting Actor (Abdi), Best Adapted Screenplay, Best Film Editing, Best Sound Mixing, and Best Sound Editing – though it did not win any of the categories.

==== Film critic Top Ten lists ====
Various American critics have named the film as one of the best of 2013.

- 1st – Kenneth Turan, Los Angeles Times
- 2nd – Empire
- 3rd – Roger Moore, Movie Nation
- 4th – Rafer Guzmán, Newsday
- 4th – Anne Thompson, Indiewire
- 5th – Christopher Orr, The Atlantic
- 5th – Chris Nastawaty, Entertainment Weekly
- 5th – Matt Singer, The Dissolve
- 5th – Christopher Rosen & Mike Ryan, Huffington Post
- 6th – Richard Roeper, Chicago Sun-Times
- 6th – Mara Reinstein, Us Weekly
- 6th – Randy Myers, San Jose Mercury News
- 6th – Mick LaSalle, San Francisco Chronicle
- 7th – Richard Lawson, Vanity Fair
- 7th – Peter Travers, Rolling Stone
- 7th – Joe Neumaier, New York Daily News
- 8th – Sasha Stone, Awards Daily
- 8th – Lisa Kennedy, Denver Post
- 8th – Barbara Vancheri, Pittsburgh Post-Gazette
- 9th – Genevieve Koski, The Dissolve
- 9th – Mike Scott, The Times-Picayune
- 9th – James Berardinelli, Reelviews
- Best of 2013 (listed alphabetically, not ranked) – David Denby, The New Yorker
- Best of 2013 (listed alphabetically, not ranked) – Manohla Dargis, The New York Times

=== Accolades ===
Awards
Award	Category	Recipient(s)	Result	Ref.
AACTA International Awards	Best Film	Captain Phillips	Nominated	
AACTA International Awards	Best Direction	Paul Greengrass	Nominated	
AACTA International Awards	Best Actor	Tom Hanks	Nominated	
Academy Awards	Best Picture	Scott Rudin, Dana Brunetti and Michael De Luca	Nominated	
Academy Awards	Best Supporting Actor	Barkhad Abdi	Nominated	
Academy Awards	Best Adapted Screenplay	Billy Ray	Nominated	
Academy Awards	Best Film Editing	Christopher Rouse	Nominated	
Academy Awards	Best Sound Editing	Oliver Tarney	Nominated	
Academy Awards	Best Sound Mixing	Chris Burdon, Mark Taylor, Mike Prestwood Smith and Chris Munro	Nominated	
Alliance of Women Film Journalists	Best Actor in a Supporting Role	Barkhad Abdi	Nominated	
Alliance of Women Film Journalists	Best Screenplay, Adapted	Billy Ray	Nominated	
Alliance of Women Film Journalists	Best Editing	Christopher Rouse	Nominated	
American Cinema Editors	Best Edited Feature Film – Dramatic	Christopher Rouse	Won	
American Film Institute	Top Ten Films of the Year	Captain Phillips	Won	
American Society of Cinematographers	Outstanding Achievement in Cinematography in Theatrical Releases	Barry Ackroyd	Nominated	
Art Directors Guild	Excellence in Production Design – Contemporary Film	Paul Kirby	Nominated	
Black Reel Awards	Best Supporting Actor	Barkhad Abdi	Won	
Black Reel Awards	Best Breakthrough Performance – Male	Barkhad Abdi	Won	
British Academy Film Awards	Best Film	Captain Phillips	Nominated	
British Academy Film Awards	Best Director	Paul Greengrass	Nominated	
British Academy Film Awards	Best Actor in a Leading Role	Tom Hanks	Nominated	
British Academy Film Awards	Best Actor in a Supporting Role	Barkhad Abdi	Won	
British Academy Film Awards	Best Adapted Screenplay	Billy Ray	Nominated	
British Academy Film Awards	Best Cinematography	Barry Ackroyd	Nominated	
British Academy Film Awards	Best Original Music	Henry Jackman	Nominated	
British Academy Film Awards	Best Editing	Christopher Rouse	Nominated	
British Academy Film Awards	Best Sound	Captain Phillips	Nominated	
Casting Society of America	Big Budget Drama	Francine Maisler and Donna M. Belajac	Nominated	
Chicago Film Critics Association	Best Supporting Actor	Barkhad Abdi	Nominated	
Chicago Film Critics Association	Most Promising Performer	Barkhad Abdi	Nominated	
Cinema Audio Society	Outstanding Achievement in Sound Mixing – Motion Picture – Live Action	Chris Munro, Mike Prestwood Smith, Chris Burdon, Mark Taylor, Al Clay, Howard London and Glen Gathard	Nominated	
Detroit Film Critics Society	Best Director	Paul Greengrass	Nominated	
Detroit Film Critics Society	Best Actor	Tom Hanks	Nominated	
Detroit Film Critics Society	Best Supporting Actor	Barkhad Abdi	Nominated	
Directors Guild of America Awards	Outstanding Direction – Feature Film	Paul Greengrass	Nominated	
Empire Awards	Best Film	Captain Phillips	Nominated	
Empire Awards	Best Thriller	Captain Phillips	Nominated	
Empire Awards	Best Actor	Tom Hanks	Nominated	
Empire Awards	Best Director	Paul Greengrass	Nominated	
Empire Awards	Best Male Newcomer	Barkhad Abdi	Nominated	
Golden Globe Awards	Best Motion Picture – Drama	Captain Phillips	Nominated	
Golden Globe Awards	Best Actor – Motion Picture Drama	Tom Hanks	Nominated	
Golden Globe Awards	Best Supporting Actor – Motion Picture	Barkhad Abdi	Nominated	
Golden Globe Awards	Best Director	Paul Greengrass	Nominated	
London Film Critics Circle	Actor of the Year	Tom Hanks	Nominated	
London Film Critics Circle	Supporting Actor of the Year	Barkhad Abdi	Won	
London Film Critics Circle	Director of the Year	Paul Greengrass	Nominated	
Motion Picture Sound Editors	Best Sound Editing: Sound Effects & Foley in a Feature Film	Oliver Tarney	Nominated	
Motion Picture Sound Editors	Best Sound Editing: Dialogue & ADR in a Feature Film	Oliver Tarney	Won	
Online Film Critics Society	Best Actor	Tom Hanks	Nominated	
Online Film Critics Society	Best Supporting Actor	Barkhad Abdi	Nominated	
People's Choice Awards	Favorite Dramatic Movie	Captain Phillips	Nominated	
Producers Guild of America Awards	Best Theatrical Motion Picture	Captain Phillips	Nominated	
San Diego Film Critics Society	Best Actor	Tom Hanks	Nominated	
San Diego Film Critics Society	Best Adapted Screenplay	Billy Ray	Nominated	
San Diego Film Critics Society	Best Editing	Christopher Rouse	Won	
San Francisco Film Critics Circle	Best Supporting Actor	Barkhad Abdi	Nominated	
San Francisco Film Critics Circle	Best Editing	Christopher Rouse	Nominated	
Satellite Awards	Best Film	Captain Phillips	Nominated	
Satellite Awards	Best Director	Paul Greengrass	Nominated	
Satellite Awards	Best Actor – Motion Picture	Tom Hanks	Nominated	
Satellite Awards	Best Adapted Screenplay	Billy Ray	Nominated	
Satellite Awards	Best Sound	Captain Phillips	Nominated	
Screen Actors Guild Awards	Outstanding Performance by a Male Actor in a Leading Role	Tom Hanks	Nominated	
Screen Actors Guild Awards	Outstanding Performance by a Male Actor in a Supporting Role	Barkhad Abdi	Nominated	
St. Louis Film Critics Association	Best Supporting Actor	Barkhad Abdi	Nominated	
St. Louis Film Critics Association	Best Adapted Screenplay	Billy Ray	Nominated	
St. Louis Film Critics Association	Best Scene	The scene near the end of the film when Phillips is being checked out by military medical personnel and breaks down.	Nominated	
USC Scripter Award	USC Libraries Scripter Award	Richard Philips, Stephan Talty and Billy Ray	Nominated	
Washington D.C. Area Film Critics Association	Best Adapted Screenplay	Billy Ray	Nominated	

== Historical accuracy ==
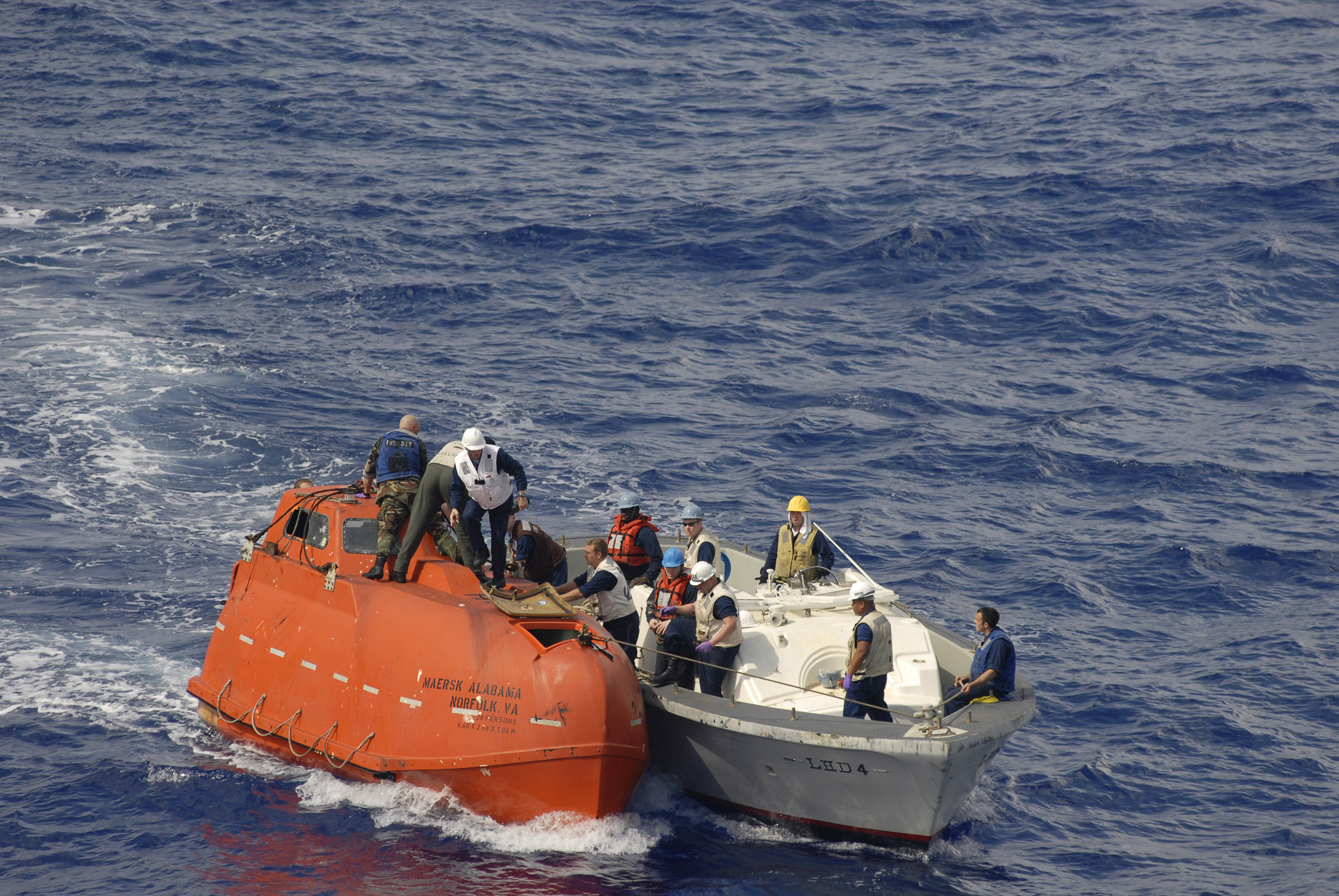
Capt. Phillips was held captive in the lifeboat by pirates for five days.

Since the film's release, there has been controversy over its portrayal of Captain Richard Phillips, with several crew members claiming that he was not the hero presented in the film, according to lawsuits filed by more than half of the crew of the Maersk Alabama. The crew members claim Phillips was at least partly at fault, along with the shipping company and the ship operator, for an "insistence on being fast and making money ... [getting] the Alabama within 250 miles of the Somali coast..." The lawsuit was reportedly settled before it went to trial.

Phillips told CNN's Drew Griffin in 2010 and in a court deposition in 2013 that he ignored the numerous warnings that urged him to go farther out to sea. When asked in 2013 why he decided not to take the ship farther offshore, Phillips testified, "I don't believe 600 miles would make you safe. I didn't believe 1,200 miles would make you safe. As I told the crew, it would be a matter of when, not if ... We were always in this area." Between 2009 and 2011, pirates from Somalia had attacked ships as far away as 1,000 and even 1,300 nautical miles.

Phillips's first mate Shane Murphy stated in an interview with Vulture published on October 13, 2013, that he was satisfied with how the movie portrayed both Phillips and himself, and stated that he was only disappointed that the film did not show footage of the crews' families at home or the President's comments on the hijacking.

The film's director Paul Greengrass publicly stated that he "stands behind the authenticity of Captain Phillips", despite complaints of inaccuracy with how the film portrays the events surrounding the hijacking, and "at the end of the day, it is easy to make anonymous accusations against a film. But the facts are clear. Captain Phillips's ship was attacked, and the ship and the crew and its cargo made it safely to port with no injuries or loss of life. That's the story we told, and it's an accurate one."

== See also ==
- A Hijacking
- Pirates of the 20th Century
- Survival film
- List of films featuring the United States Navy SEALs
- List of films featuring drones
