= USS Boxer (LHD-4) =

Amphibious assault ship

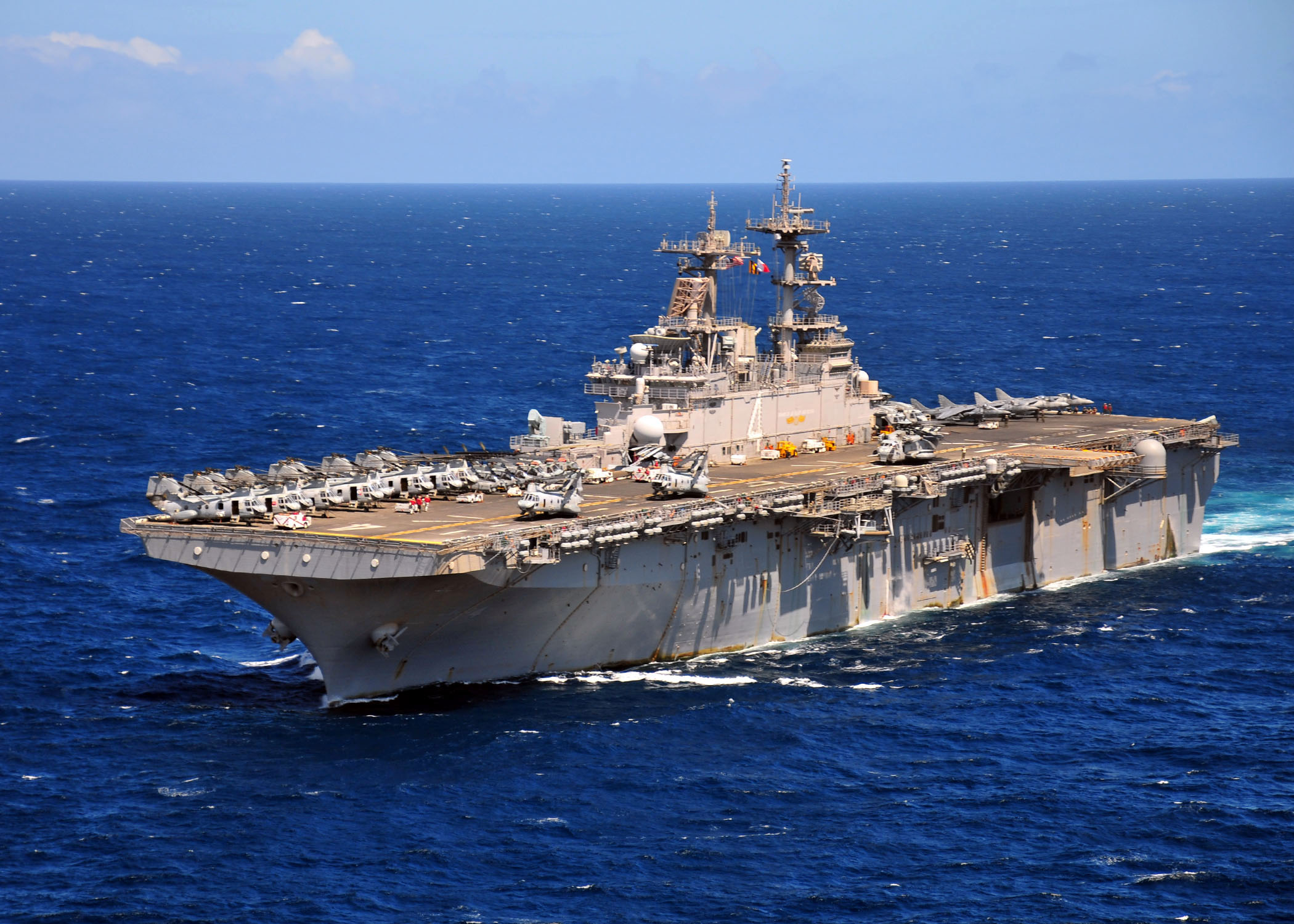
- USS Boxer underway on 18 August 2011

History

United States
- Name: Boxer
- Awarded: 3 October 1988
- Builder: Ingalls Shipbuilding
- Laid down: 18 April 1991
- Launched: 13 August 1993
- Sponsored by: Becky Miller
- Christened: 28 August 1993
- Commissioned: 11 February 1995
- Home port: San Diego
- Identification: MMSI number: 368710000; Callsign: NBXR; Hull number: LHD-4
- Motto: Honor, Courage, Strength
- Status: in active service
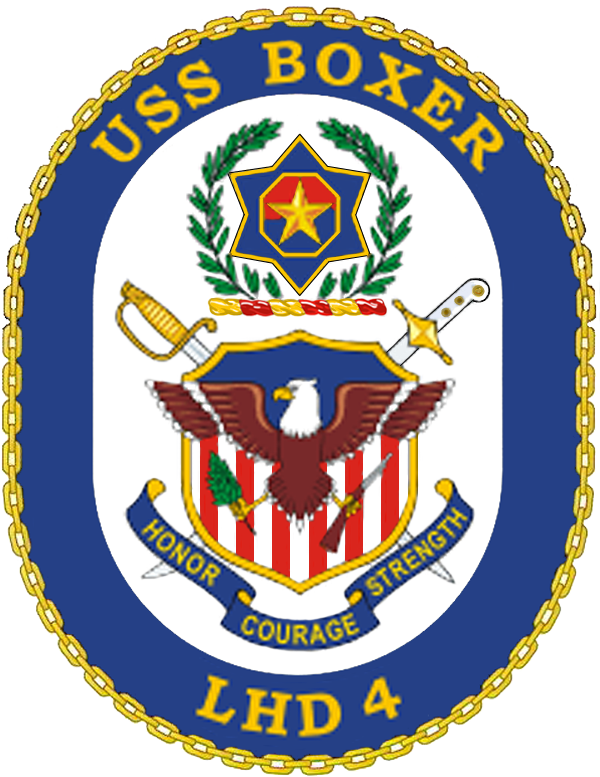
- Badge

General characteristics
- Type: Wasp-class amphibious assault ship
- Displacement: 40,500 long tons (41,150 t) full load
- Length: 843 ft (257 m)
- Beam: 104 ft (31.8 m)
- Draft: 27 ft (8.1 m)
- Propulsion: Two boilers, two geared steam turbines, two shafts, 70,000 shp (52,000 kW);
- Speed: 22 knots (41 km/h; 25 mph)
- Range: 9,500 nautical miles (17,600 km; 10,900 mi) at 18 kn (33 km/h; 21 mph)
- Well deck dimensions: 266-by-50-foot (81 by 15.2 m) by 28-foot (8.5 m) high
- Boats & landing craft carried: 3 Landing Craft Air Cushion or; 2 Landing Craft Utility or; 12 Landing Craft Mechanized
- Troops: 1,687 troops (plus 184 surge) Marine detachment
- Complement: 1,208
- Sensors & processing systems: 1 AN/SPS-49 2-D Air Search Radar; 1 AN/SPS-48 3-D Air Search Radar; 1 AN/SPS-67 Surface Search Radar; 1 Mk23 Target Acquisition System (TAS); 1 AN/SPN-43 Marshalling Air Traffic Control Radar; 1 AN/SPN-35 Air Traffic Control Radar; 1 AN/URN-25 TACAN system; 1 AN/UPX-24 Identification Friend Foe
- Armament: Two RIM-116 Rolling Airframe Missile launchers; Two RIM-7 Sea Sparrow missile launchers; Three 20 mm Phalanx CIWS systems; Four 25 mm Mk 38 chain guns; Four .50 BMG machine guns
- Aircraft carried: Actual mix depends on the mission; Standard Complement: 6 AV-8B Harrier II attack aircraft; or; 6 F-35B Lightning II stealth strike-fighters; 4 AH-1W/Z Super Cobra/Viper attack helicopter; 12 MV-22B Osprey assault support tiltrotor; 4 CH-53E Super Stallion heavy-lift helicopters; 3–4 UH-1Y Venom utility helicopters; Assault: 22+ MV-22B Osprey assault support tiltrotors; Sea Control: 20 AV-8B Harrier II attack aircraft; or; 20 F-35B Lightning II stealth strike-fighters; 6 SH-60F/HH-60H ASW helicopters

USS Boxer (LHD-4) is a Wasp-class amphibious assault ship of the United States Navy. It is the sixth U.S. ship to bear the name of the original HMS Boxer, which was captured from the British during the War of 1812.

== Construction and career ==
Boxer was constructed at Ingalls Shipbuilding, Pascagoula, Mississippi, launched 13 August 1993, and commissioned 11 February 1995. She immediately left for San Diego, California, via the Panama Canal. Although she had been designed to safely transit the canal, her bridge wing and other smaller components were sheared off in the transit.

After minor repairs and system checkout, Boxer deployed to the Western Pacific from 24 March 1997 to 24 September 1997, along with Ogden and Fort Fisher, and visited many foreign ports of call. Boxer also participated in RIMPAC the following year, then on 5 December 1998 deployed again to the Western Pacific.

Boxer deployed again to the Western Pacific, Persian Gulf, and Red Sea on 14 March 2001 in support of Operation Southern Watch. She visited Singapore, Thailand, Guam, Jebel Ali, Bahrain, and Jordan, returning to the United States on 14 September 2001, just days after the attacks of 11 September 2001.

In 2003, as a result of the impending war and the need for troops in Iraq, Boxer found herself deploying yet again, this time six months ahead of schedule. This was a six-month deployment in direct support of Operation Iraqi Freedom. She deployed with six other ships from San Diego on 17 January 2003: USS Bonhomme Richard, USS Anchorage, USS Cleveland, USS Comstock, USS Dubuque, and USS Pearl Harbor.

She returned to the United States on 26 July 2003. Also in 2003, she won the Marjorie Sterrett Battleship Fund Award for the Pacific Fleet.

In another early deployment, to become known as a surge deployment, Boxer steamed alone from San Diego on 14 January 2004 to support the ongoing rebuilding efforts in Iraq, dubbed Operation Iraqi Freedom II. She delivered equipment and supplies to Kuwaiti Naval Base in the northern Persian Gulf for the continuing support of the postwar rebuilding of Iraq. She returned home on 29 April 2004.

Boxer was deployed with the 15th MEU from her San Diego port on 13 September 2006. They arrived to Iraq in November and returned to dock in San Diego on 31 May 2007.

From 20 April 2008 to 26 June 2008, Boxer conducted a humanitarian mission in Central and South America.

=== Antipiracy task force ===
Boxer is designated as the flagship of Combined Task Force 151, the international antipiracy task force pursuing pirates off the coast of Somalia.

On 10 April 2009, Boxer was en route to assist USS Bainbridge and USS Halyburton in negotiating the release of Richard Phillips, captain of U.S.-flagged container ship MV Maersk Alabama, who was held hostage by Somali pirates 300 miles (480 km) off the Horn of Africa. On 12 April 2009, Captain Phillips was freed during a US Navy assault in which three of the Somali pirates were killed and one was captured. Captain Phillips was transported to Boxer for medical examination and rest.

Around 1 May 2009, Boxer assisted some 200 members of the German special operations unit GSG-9 in getting close to the hijacked German container ship MV Hansa Stavanger. During the last phase of the operation, James L. Jones, the U.S. national security advisor, withheld final approval for the operation out of concern for the safety of the 25 sailors on board the vessel. This led to the decision by the German department of defense and the German department of the interior to abort the planned attack on the freighter for the time being and the GSG-9 unit, which is under the command of the German secretary of the interior, returned to its base of operations at the airport of Mombasa, Kenya. It was reported that the German department of defense influence and contacts to James Jones led to the U.S. decision to withdraw from the scene.

The ship returned to San Diego on 1 August 2009. During her transit of the Pacific, 69 of the sailors and marines aboard the ship contracted swine influenza, forcing the cancellation of a planned "Tiger Cruise" from Hawaii to meet the ships for several hundred relatives and friends.

=== 2010–2020 ===
The ship, with the 13th Marine Expeditionary Unit, departed San Diego on 22 February 2011 for a seven-month deployment in the Pacific and Indian Oceans. Accompanying the ship on the deployment were USS Green Bay and USS Comstock.

On 6 May 2016, it was reported that the U.S. staged Boxer, supported by the destroyers Gravely and Gonzalez, off the coast of Yemen with 2,000 to 4,500 U.S. Marines of the 13th MEU in the flotilla to provide support to coalition forces in Yemen fighting AQAP militants. On 16 June 2016, Boxer, supported by amphibious warfare ships New Orleans and Harpers Ferry, took part in Operation Inherent Resolve; AV-8BII Harriers of the 13th MEU flying off the ship began airstrikes against ISIL in Iraq and Syria, making it the first time the U.S. Navy used ship-based aircraft from both the Mediterranean and the Persian Gulf at the same time during the operation (aircraft from the aircraft carrier Harry S. Truman began airstrikes on ISIL targets from the Mediterranean on 3 June).

On 18 July 2019, President Donald Trump stated that the ship shot down and destroyed an Iranian drone over the Strait of Hormuz. According to a statement by the President, the drone was downed after "ignoring multiple stand-down calls." Iranian officials rejected Trump's statement on downing an Iranian drone and the IRGC released a video and claimed it was monitoring the ship and some other American military vessels, including USS Harpers Ferry, USS John P. Murtha, USS Bainbridge, and USS McFaul by the drone on the morning of 18 July.

On 15 March 2020, a sailor aboard, it was reported to have tested presumptive positive two days prio, for SARS-CoV-2, the virus at the heart of the COVID-19 pandemic, marking the first case of a coronavirus case aboard an American warship. The sailor subsequently quarantined at home. A second sailor tested positive on 17 March 2020 and also was quarantined at home.

=== Modernization and maintenance ===
On 7 April 2020, BAE systems was reported to have been awarded a contract from the US Navy to perform extensive modernization and maintenance of USS Boxer, with work scheduled to commence in June 2020, and to be completed around December 2021. Notably, as a part of this work, Boxer was updated to be able to operate with the F-35 Joint Strike Fighter. As of 21 July 2023, ongoing maintenance issues had prevented the ship from returning to sea. As of 25 March 2024, Boxer was seen departing San Diego, California. The ship returned to San Diego 10 days later due to mechanical problems.

=== 2026 Iran war ===
On 19 March 2026, Boxers Amphibious Ready Group (ARG) was reported to be deploying ahead of schedule to support Operation Epic Fury. Boxer had left San Diego, California to begin her journey to the Middle East, and would be joined by USS Portland and USS Comstock. The ARG would join the Tripoli ARG that was already underway. The 11th Marine Expeditionary Unit (MEU) had embarked by 19 March on the ARG ships, which were slated to sail through the Indo-Pacific to the Middle East. Around 2,500 Marine Corps personnel of the total of 4,000 service members were in the fleet. The sailors and marines shortened their leave following certification and training to accelerate their deployment.

=== Deployments ===
- 24 March 1997 – 24 September 1997 Maiden deployment
- 5 December 1998 – 5 June 1999 West Pac-Indian Ocean-Persian Gulf
- 13 March 2001 – 14 September 2001 West Pac-Indian Ocean-Persian Gulf
- 17 January 2003 – 26 July 2003 West Pac-Indian Ocean-Persian Gulf
- 14 January 2004 – 29 April 2004 West Pac-Indian Ocean-Persian Gulf
- 29 April 2005 – 14 September 2005 Western Pacific
- 13 September 2006 – 31 May 2007 West Pac-Indian Ocean-Persian Gulf
- 28 April 2008 – 26 June 2008 Eastern Pacific
- 9 January 2009 – 1 August 2009 West Pac-Indian Ocean-Persian Gulf
- 22 February 2011 – 30 September 2011 West Pac-Indian Ocean-Persian Gulf
- 23 August 2013 – 25 April 2014 West Pac-Indian Ocean-Persian Gulf
- 12 February 2016 – 12 September 2016 West Pac-Indian Ocean-Persian Gulf
- 1 May 2019 – 27 November 2019 West Pac-Indian Ocean-Persian Gulf
- 1 April 2024 - 10 April 2024 (Returned to base in San Diego and deployment delayed due to mechanical issues) 16 July 2024 (post-repairs) - 24 November 2024

== Awards ==
USS Boxer has been awarded the Navy Battle "E" numerous times;

- 1 January - 31 December 1995
- 1 January - 31 December 1998
- 1 January - 31 December 1999
- 1 January - 31 December 2001
- 1 January - 31 December 2003
- 1 January - 31 December 2007
- 1 January - 31 December 2011
- 1 January - 31 December 2012
- 1 January - 31 December 2013
- 1 January - 31 December 2014
- 1 January - 31 December 2015
- 1 January - 31 December 2016
- 1 January - 31 December 2017

2013 awards

- Ship Safety (3rd)
- Engineering/Survivability (6th)
- Logistics Management (12th)
- Maritime Warfare Excellence Awards (19th)
