= FV Win Far No.161 =

Taiwanese fishing vessel hijacked in 2009

History

Mozambique
- Name: Win Far No.161 (穩發161號)
- Owner: Hsien Lung Yin
- Operator: Win Jyi Fishery CO. LTD.
- Port of registry: Kaohsiung, Taiwan
- Route: Tuna fishing in the Indian Ocean
- Builder: Lin Sheng Shipbuilding
- Completed: June 1995
- In service: June 1995
- Out of service: 2021
- Identification: IMO number: 8747214; MMSI number: 650000160; Call sign: C9Y94
- Status: In active service

General characteristics
- Type: Fishing vessel
- Tonnage: 696 *GRT *372 DWT
- Length: 56.35 m (184.9 ft) LOA
- Beam: 9 m (30 ft)
- Draught: 0.2 m (7.9 in)
- Crew: 30 (2 Taiwanese, 5 Chinese, 6 Indonesian and 17 Philippine nationals); 27 survivors; 1 Chinese and 2 Indonesian nationals died

FV Win Far No.161 (Chinese: 穩發161號, romanized: Wěn Fā 161 Hào, lit. 'Stable Development No.161') is a Taiwanese fishing vessel captured by Somali pirates on 6 April 2009 near the Seychelles. The ship was released on 11 February 2010 after a ransom was paid, and after the ship had been used as a mother ship in the Maersk Alabama hijacking. Two of the 30 crew had died during their time held hostage, due to malnutrition and neglect by their Somali captors. The ship was likely captured by Abduwali Muse.

After negotiation, the crew and the vessel were released by the pirates on 11 February 2010, and returned to Kaohsiung, Taiwan on 5 March 2010.
