= MV Tygra =

Container vessel famously attacked by pirates in 2009

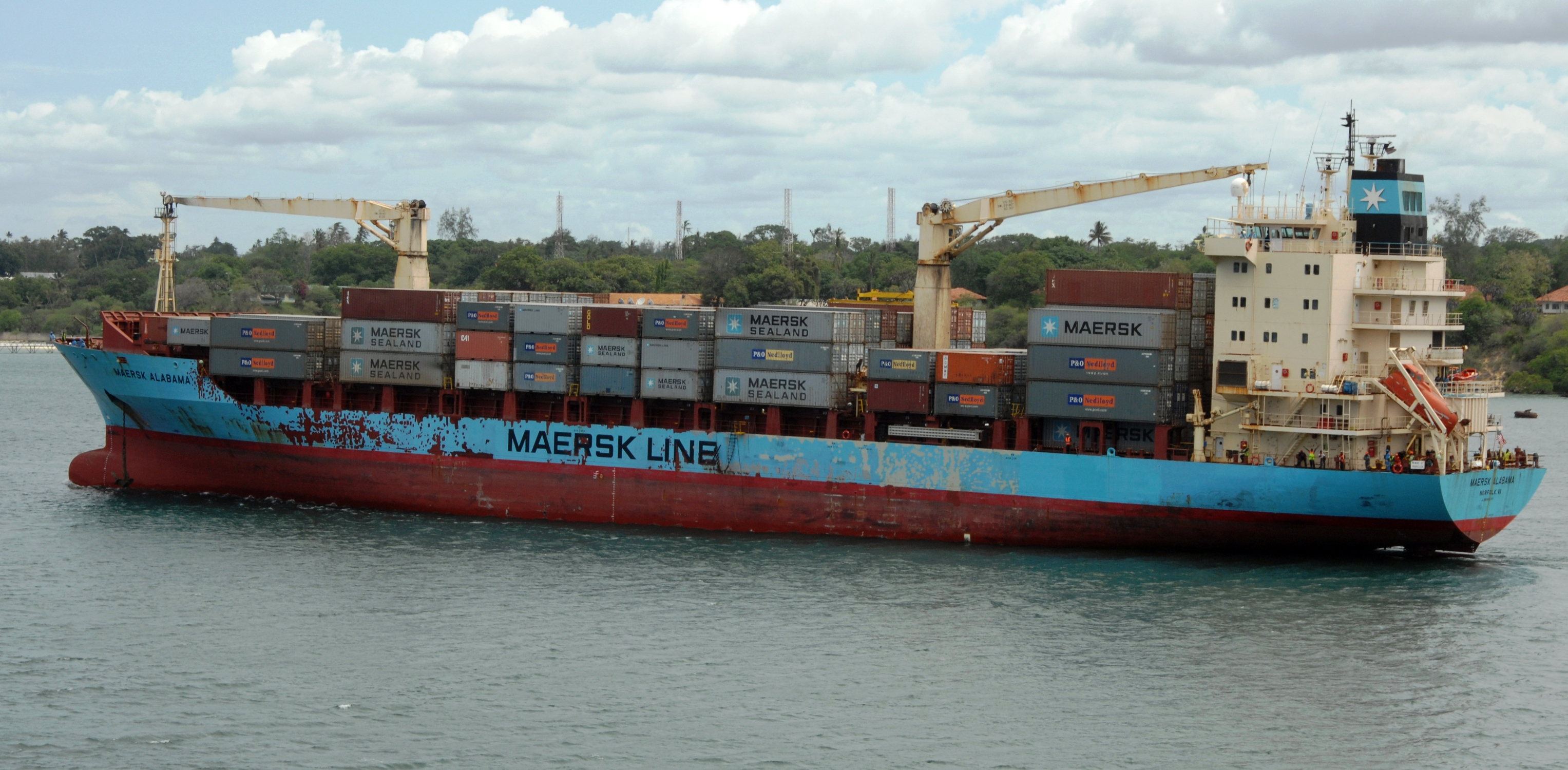
- Maersk Alabama leaving Mombasa, Kenya, April 21, 2009.

History

- Name: Alva Maersk (1998–2004); Maersk Alabama (2004–2015); Maersk Andaman (2015–2016); Tygra (2016–present)
- Owner: A.P. Moller-Maersk Group (1998–2016); Element Shipmanagement SA (2016–present)
- Operator: Maersk Line (1998–2004); Maersk Line Limited (2004–2015); Maersk Line (2015–2016); Waterman Steamship Corporation (2016–Present)
- Port of registry: Denmark (1998–2004); Norfolk, Virginia, U.S. (2004–2015); Singapore (2015–2016); Monrovia, Liberia (2016–present)
- Ordered: 1989
- Builder: China Shipbuilding Corporation Keelung, Taiwan
- Yard number: 676
- Launched: 5 September 1998
- Completed: 1998
- Maiden voyage: 1998
- In service: 1998–present
- Home port: Monrovia, Liberia
- Identification: IMO number: 9164263
- Status: In active service

General characteristics
- Class & type: A-Class
- Type: Container ship
- Tonnage: 17,375 DWT; 14,120 GT
- Length: 155 m (508 ft 6 in) LOA; 145.80 metres (478 ft 4 in) LBP
- Beam: 25.30 m (83 ft 0 in)
- Propulsion: 1 Hitachi-Man 7S50 MC-C
- Speed: 24–25 kn
- Capacity: 1,092 TEU
- Crew: 21-31

MV Tygra (formerly MV Maersk Alabama) is a container ship currently operated by the Waterman Steamship Corporation and owned by Element Shipmanagement SA of Piraeus, Greece. She was previously owned by the A.P. Moller-Maersk Group and operated by Maersk Line and Maersk Line Limited.

She had a light-blue hull and a beige superstructure like all Maersk vessels, regardless of their flag of registry. She was hijacked by pirates near Somalia in 2009 and her crew held hostage. Four additional unsuccessful hijacking attempts were made in 2009, 2010, and 2011.

== History ==
Alva Maersk was built by China Shipbuilding Corporation, Keelung, Taiwan at yard number 676 and launched in 1998. As Alva Maersk, She was flagged to Denmark. In 2004, Alva Maersk was renamed Maersk Alabama and reflagged to the United States, with her operator, Maersk Line, Limited, based in Norfolk, Virginia. She has been involved in seven incidents and was employed on Maersk Line's East Africa 4 service. Her regular route was from Mombasa, Kenya to Salalah, Oman, to Djibouti, and then returning to Mombasa.

=== 2004 detention ===
In 2004, the ship was detained in Kuwait after becoming the victim of an apparent fraud scheme. According to papers filed by the A. P. Moller-Maersk Group with the United States District Court for the Southern District of New York in 2005, Kuwait-based expatriates scammed the Group out of millions of dollars. Low-value goods were allegedly shipped under the guise of fraudulent, high-value bills of lading. Maersk was subsequently sued for losing goods that had never existed. Those allegedly behind the scheme were able to detain Alva Maersk in Kuwait as collateral. The ship was released in April 2004 after the A. P. Moller-Maersk Group was forced to put up $1.86 million as collateral.

=== April 2009 attempted pirate seizure ===
On April 7, 2009, the U.S. Maritime Administration, following NATO advisories, released a Somalia Gulf of Aden advisory to mariners recommending ships to stay at least 600 nautical miles (1,100 km; 690 mi) off the coast of Somalia. On April 8, 2009, four Somali pirates boarded Maersk Alabama when she was located 240 nmi (440 km; 280 mi) southeast of the Somalia port city of Eyl. With a crew of 20, the ship was en route to Mombasa, Kenya. The ship was carrying 17,000 metric tons of cargo, of which 5,000 metric tons were relief supplies bound for Somalia, Uganda, and Kenya.

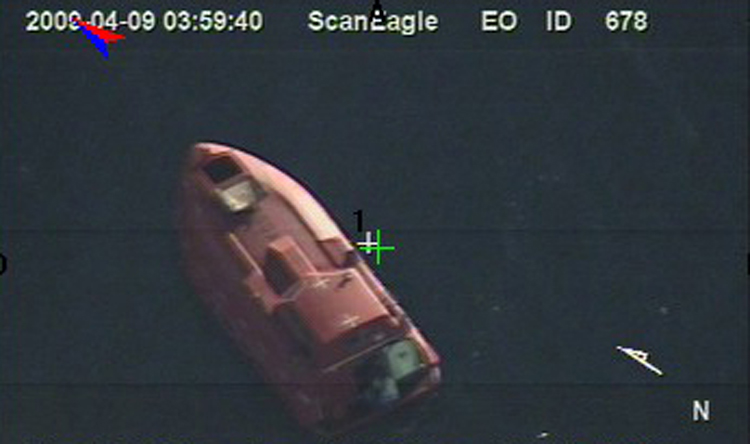
The 28-foot lifeboat where Captain Richard Phillips and the four Somali pirates were held up as seen from a U.S. Navy Scan Eagle UAV.

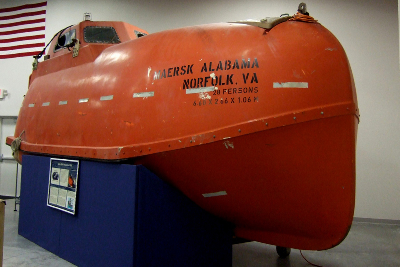
The Maersk Alabama lifeboat on which Captain Phillips was held hostage by Somali pirates in 2009 is on display at the National Navy UDT-SEAL Museum.

According to Chief Engineer Mike Perry, the engineers sank the pirate speedboat shortly after the boarding by continuously swinging the rudder of Maersk Alabama thus scuttling the smaller boat. As the pirates were boarding the ship, the crew members locked themselves in the engine room while the captain and two other crew members remained on the bridge. The engineers then took control of the ship from down below, rendering the bridge controls useless. The pirates were thus unable to control the ship. The crew later used "brute force" to overpower one of the pirates, Abduwali Muse, and free one of the hostages, Abu Thair Mohd Zahid Reza. Frustrated, the pirates decided to leave the ship, taking Phillips to a lifeboat as their bargaining chip. The crew attempted to exchange this captured pirate, whom they had kept tied up for twelve hours, for Captain Phillips. The captured pirate was released, but the pirates refused to release Phillips in exchange. Since the battery had died on the open-air boat, they left in the ship's covered lifeboat, taking Phillips with them. The lifeboat carried ten days of food rations, water, and basic survival supplies. On April 8, the destroyer USS Bainbridge and the frigate USS Halyburton were dispatched to the Gulf of Aden in response to a hostage situation, and reached Maersk Alabama early on April 9. Maersk Alabama then departed from the area with an armed escort, towards her original destination in Mombasa, Kenya, with the vessel's Chief Mate (C/M) Shane Murphy in charge. On Saturday, April 11, Maersk Alabama arrived in the port of Mombasa, Kenya, still under U.S. military escort, where C/M Murphy was relieved by Captain Larry Aasheim, who had previously been captain of Maersk Alabama until Richard Phillips relieved him eight days before the pirate attack. An 18-man marine security team was on board. The FBI secured the ship as a crime scene.

Meanwhile, a standoff had begun on April 9 between Bainbridge and the pirates in Maersk Alabama's lifeboat, where they continued to hold Captain Phillips hostage. Three days later, on Sunday, April 12, Navy marksmen opened fire and killed the three pirates on the lifeboat, and Phillips was rescued in good condition. Bainbridge captain Commander Frank Castellano, with prior authorization from U.S. President Barack Obama, ordered the action after determining that Phillips' life was in immediate danger, based on reports that a pirate was pointing an AK-47 assault rifle at his back. U.S. Navy SEAL snipers on Bainbridge's fantail opened fire, killing the three pirates with bullets to the head. One of the three slain was later identified as Ali Aden Elmi. A fourth pirate, Abduwali Muse, who was aboard the Bainbridge and negotiating for Phillips' release while being treated for an injury sustained in the takeover of Maersk Alabama, surrendered and was taken into custody. Muse's parents asked that he be pardoned because he was either 15 or 16 years old at the time of the incident, but in court, it was ruled that he was not a juvenile and would be tried as an adult. He pleaded guilty to piracy charges and was sentenced to over 33 years in prison.

The lifeboat in which Captain Phillips was held hostage is now on display at the National Navy UDT-SEAL Museum in Ft. Pierce, FL. An example of the Scan Eagle UAV used to monitor the crisis is also on display. Captain Phillips, a film based on the hijacking, was released in 2013.

=== November 2009 pirate attack ===
At 6:30 a.m. on November 18, 2009, Maersk Alabama was reportedly sailing some 350 nautical miles (650 km) east of Somalia when she was fired upon by four pirates wielding automatic weapons and traveling in a skiff. The assault failed after guards on the ship responded with small arms fire and acoustical weapons. Afterward, a Djibouti-based patrol plane flew to the scene, and an EU ship searched the area.

=== September 2010 suspicious approach of pirate skiff ===
On 29 September 2010, the vessel was targeted by Somali pirates wielding AK-47s. The security forces on board Maersk Alabama repelled a skiff with five pirates approximately 1,530 kilometres (950 mi) east of Somalia. The incident went unreported by the media until November 2010.

=== March 2011 attempted hijacking ===
On 8 March 2011, Somali pirates again targeted the vessel. A security force on board the Maersk Alabama fired warning shots and turned the suspects away.

=== May 2011 attempted hijacking ===
At midnight on 14 May 2011, while transiting westbound in the internationally recognized corridor, Maersk Alabama was approached by a skiff of five pirates on the starboard stern. After turning to follow the ship's wake, the skiff quickly closed in to 30 metres (98 ft), preparing to board via a hook ladder, at which point the embarked security team fired two shots into the skiff. The skiff quickly broke off, losing radar contact after 10 minutes.

=== February 2014 deaths of two security contractors ===
On 19 February 2014, it was reported that two former Navy SEALs working as security contractors aboard the Maersk Alabama for the private security firm Trident Group were found dead aboard the container ship a day after she docked at Port Victoria, Seychelles. Seychelles police officials reported that the autopsy found the cause of death to be "respiratory failure, with suspicion of myocardial infarction (heart attack)." The presence of a syringe and traces of heroin in the cabin led to a suspicion of drug use. In April, following receipt of a toxicology report which found alcohol in the men's blood, police confirmed that death had been caused by consumption of alcohol and heroin. As of 2018, the criminal investigation results in Seychelles had not yet been disclosed to the public. Seychelles law enforcement released the vessel on February 24. Both Maersk and Trident officially prohibit drug use on board their ships.

== See also ==
- Combined Task Force 150 and Combined Task Force 151, coalition counter-piracy operations in the region.
- Dai Hong Dan, a similar incident involving the hijacking of a North Korean ship.
- Joint Special Operations Command.
- MV Samho Jewelry, another hijacking involved in a similar rescue operation by South Korean forces.
- Operation Atalanta, a campaign of the European Union to stop piracy off the Somali coast.
- A Hijacking, a 2012 Danish film about the Maersk Alabama hijacking
- Captain Phillips, a 2013 film starring Tom Hanks about the Maersk Alabama hijacking
- Piracy in Somalia
