= Faysal Ahmed =

Somali actor (born 1990)

- Born: 11 July 1993 (age 33); Yemen
- Occupation: Actor
- Years active: 2010–present
- Height: 6 ft 3 in (1.91 m)

Faysal Ahmed (Somali: Faysal Axmed; Arabic: فيصل أحمد; born 11 July 1993) is a Somali actor based in Minneapolis, Minnesota.

== Early life ==
Ahmed was born one of nine children in 1985 in Yemen. Although his family is originally from Somalia, he grew up in Yemen. His family hails from the Osman Mahamoud sub-clan of the larger Majeerteen-Daarod. In 1999, he moved, along with his mother and some of his siblings, to the United States at the age of 14.

== Career ==
In a professional capacity, Ahmed served as a Youth Program Coordinator at the Bedlam Theater in Minneapolis. He worked there on plays and poetry. He has also participated in an enrollment push for MNsure, a health insurance program in Minnesota.

In 2013, Ahmed appeared in the film Captain Phillips. He played Najee, a ship hijacker.

Ahmed and three other actors were picked from among more than 700 participants at a 2011 casting call at the Brian Coyle Community Center in Cedar-Riverside, Minneapolis. According to the search casting director, Debbie DeLisi, the four were selected because they were "the chosen ones, that anointed group that stuck out."

In early 2014, he revealed that he was going to Los Angeles by spring in order to continue his acting career. In 2016 he partook in A Stray, directed by Musa Syeed.

Ahmed reunited with Captain Phillips castmate Barkhad Abdi, in the second season of Castle Rock, in which he starred in six episodes.

== Filmography ==
Film

- Captain Phillips (2013)
- A Stray (2016)
- Watu Wote: All of Us (2017)
- Sicario: Day of the Soldado (2018)
- 438 Days (2019)
- First Person Plural (2019)

Television

- Castle Rock (2019)
- Little America (2022)
