= USS Bainbridge (DDG-96) =

United States Navy guided missile destroyer

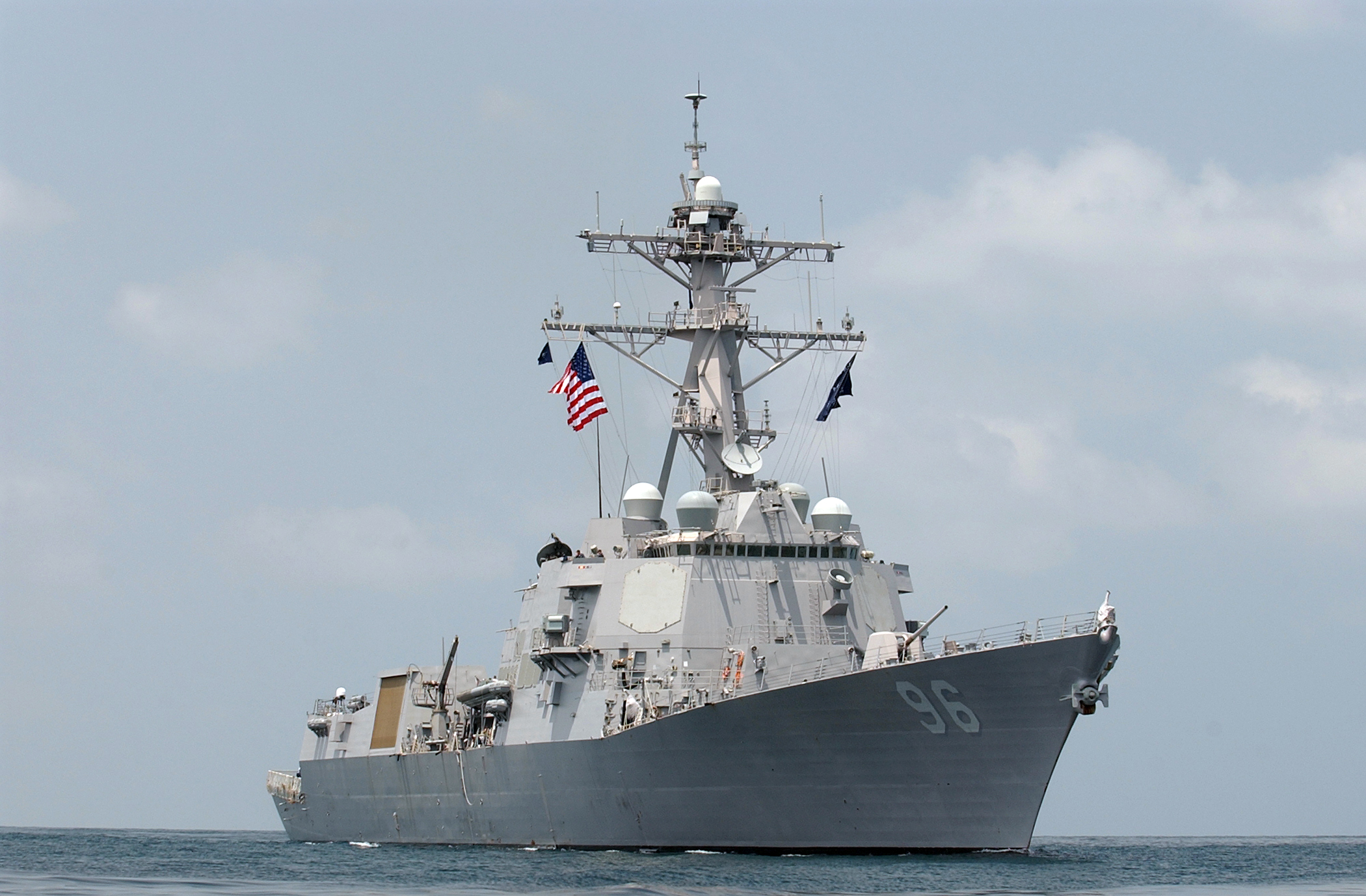
- USS Bainbridge on 25 September 2007

History

United States
- Name: Bainbridge
- Namesake: William Bainbridge
- Ordered: 6 March 1998
- Builder: Bath Iron Works
- Laid down: 7 May 2003
- Christened: 13 November 2004
- Commissioned: 12 November 2005
- Home port: Norfolk
- Identification: MMSI number: 69977000; Callsign: NBBG; Hull number: DDG-96
- Motto: Competence, Dedication, Discipline
- Status: In active service
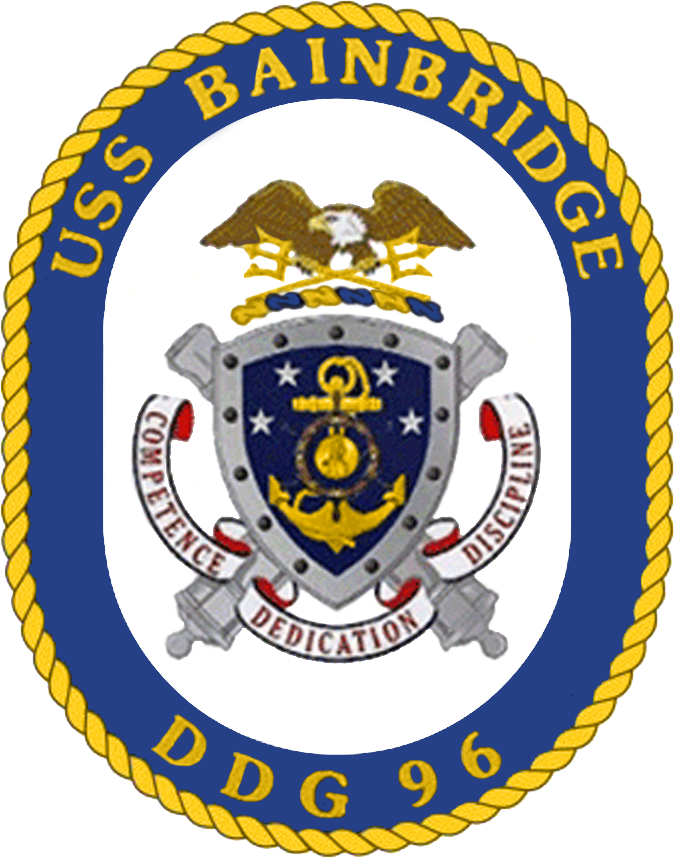
- Badge

General characteristics
- Class & type: Arleigh Burke-class destroyer
- Displacement: 9,200 tons
- Length: 509 ft 6 in (155.3 m)
- Beam: 59 ft (18 m)
- Draft: 31 ft (9.4 m)
- Propulsion: 2 × shafts
- Speed: In excess of 30 kn (56 km/h; 35 mph)
- Range: 4,400 nmi (8,100 km; 5,100 mi) at 20 kn (37 km/h; 23 mph)
- Complement: 270 officers and enlisted
- Sensors & processing systems: AN/SPY-1D radar; AN/SPS-67(V)2 surface-search radar; AN/SPS-64(V)9 surface-search radar; AN/SQS-53C sonar array; AN/SQQ-28 LAMPS III shipboard system
- Electronic warfare & decoys: AN/SLQ-32 electronic warfare suite; AN/SLQ-25 Nixie torpedo countermeasures; Mk 36 Mod 12 decoy launching systems; Mk 53 Nulka decoy launching systems; Mk 59 decoy launching systems
- Armament: Guns: 1 × 5-inch (127 mm)/62 Mk 45 Mod 4 (lightweight gun); 1 × 20 mm (0.8 in) Phalanx CIWS; 2 × 25 mm (0.98 in) Mk 38 machine gun system; 4 × 0.50 in (12.7 mm) caliber guns; Missiles: 1 × 32-cell, 1 × 64-cell (96 total cells) Mk 41 vertical launching system (VLS): RIM-66M surface-to-air missile; RIM-156 surface-to-air missile; RIM-174A Standard ERAM; RIM-161 anti-ballistic missile; RIM-162 ESSM (quad-packed); BGM-109 Tomahawk cruise missile; RUM-139 vertical launch ASROC; Torpedoes: 2 × Mark 32 triple torpedo tubes: Mark 46 lightweight torpedo; Mark 50 lightweight torpedo; Mark 54 lightweight torpedo; Drones: 2 × 4-cell (8 total cells) Block 3/Coyote LE SR drone launcher
- Aircraft carried: 2 × MH-60R Seahawk helicopters

USS Bainbridge (DDG-96) is an Arleigh Burke-class (Flight IIA) Aegis guided missile destroyer in the United States Navy. She is the fifth ship to carry the name. Bainbridge is named in honor of Commodore William Bainbridge, who as commander of the frigate USS Constitution distinguished himself in the War of 1812 when he and his crew captured HMS Java, a 38-gun fifth-rate frigate of the Royal Navy.

Since her commissioning in 2005, Bainbridge has been active in the Mediterranean Sea, but most of the attention she has garnered has been as a result of the failed hijacking attempt of the U.S.-flagged freighter MV Maersk Alabama by Somali pirates in April, 2009, which ended with the release of the vessel's master, Captain Richard Phillips, on 12 April 2009. After crewmen of the captured cargo vessel managed to retake the ship, the pirates retreated, taking the ship's master hostage in a lifeboat. Bainbridge, Halyburton, and Boxer shadowed the pirates, and with FBI assistance attempted negotiations for the safe return of the captive captain until U.S. Navy SEAL snipers resolved the situation with deadly force. The story of this incident was turned into the 2013 motion picture titled Captain Phillips, starring Tom Hanks. Bainbridge was portrayed by sister ship Truxtun.

== Construction ==
Bainbridge is one of 75 authorized Arleigh Burke-class guided missile destroyers, and is classified as a member of the Flight IIA–class variation that incorporate the 5"/62 caliber gun mount, an improvement over the previous 5 in (130 mm)/54 caliber gun mounts on the earlier Arleigh Burke-class destroyers. In addition to her guns, Bainbridge carries over 100 missiles of various types aboard two separate Mk 41 VLS magazines. Her superstructure features the AN/SPY-1 radar indicative of the Aegis combat system, which allows the destroyer to track over 100 targets simultaneously. (Owing to the presence of the Aegis system, Bainbridge and her sisters are sometimes incorrectly referred to as Aegis-class ships.) She is also equipped with the Remote Mine-hunting System (RMS), which includes the Remote Mine-hunting Vehicle (RMV), an unmanned craft that detects, classifies, and localizes underwater mines.

Bainbridge was floated from drydock and christened on 13 November 2004 at Bath Iron Works, Bath, Maine, sponsored by Susan Bainbridge Hay, Commodore William Bainbridge's great-great-great-granddaughter. She was commissioned on 12 November 2005, with Commander John M. Dorey commanding in Port Everglades, Florida.

== History ==
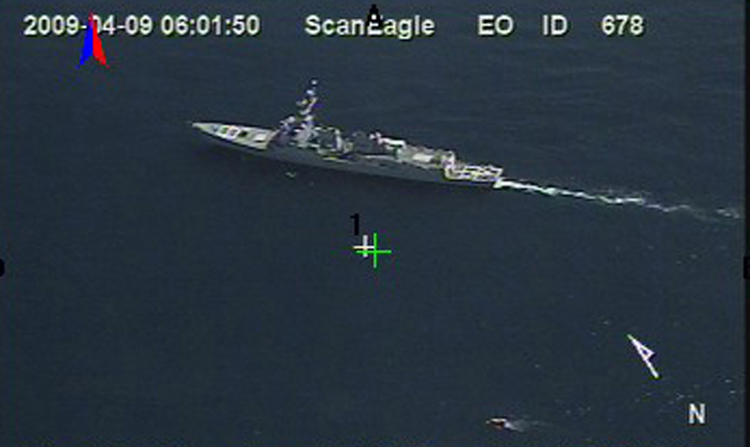
As seen from a ScanEagle UAV, Bainbridge and the Maersk Alabama lifeboat, 9 April 2009.

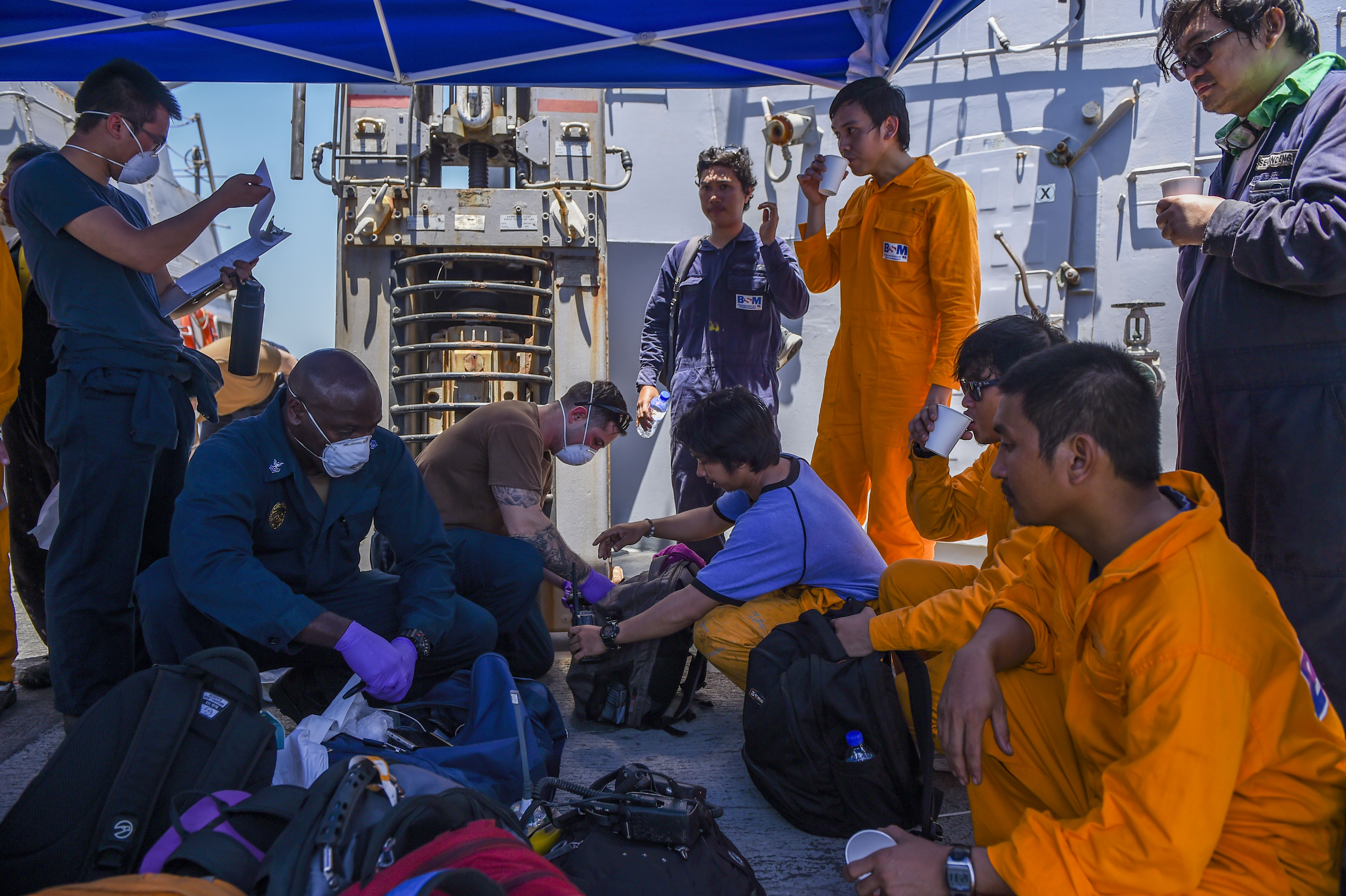
Bainbridge sailors provide aid to the crew of Kokuka Courageous after the June 2019 Gulf of Oman incident.

Bainbridge assumed flagship for Standing NATO Maritime Group 1 (SNMG-1) from USS Normandy (SNMG-1 April 2007 – August 2007) and remained flagship from August 2007 until February 2008. While on deployment under SNMG-1, they visited various ports across the Mediterranean such as Valletta, Malta; A Coruña, Spain; Istanbul, Turkey; Crete, Athens, Greece; as well as Port Louis, Mauritius; Port Victoria, Seychelles in the Indian Ocean.

On 8 April 2009, Bainbridge was dispatched in response to a hostage situation in which Somali pirates had seized control of an American-flagged container vessel, Maersk Alabama. The crew of Maersk Alabama were able to get to safety, after their captain had been taken hostage by the pirates. The captain Richard Phillips was taken to and held on a lifeboat, and refused release in an unsuccessful attempt to exchange him for a pirate the ship's crew had captured. The destroyer shadowed and later encircled the Somali pirates during the standoff, at which time the pirates and Bainbridge began negotiating for the safe release of the captain who was held captive. On 12 April 2009, Captain Phillips was freed—reportedly in good condition—during a US Navy SEAL team assault. Three of the Somali pirates were killed by US Navy SEAL sharpshooters aboard Bainbridge, and one was captured.

In January 2014, Bainbridge completed a six-month deployment to Sixth Fleet and returned to her homeport of Norfolk, Virginia.

Upon returning to Norfolk, Virginia, in December 2015 following another deployment with the United States 6th Fleet, an investigation was conducted that resulted in the three senior commanders being removed from duty. In a press release, a spokesperson says the Navy investigated Commander Sean Rongers for allegedly allowing gambling and storing fireworks on the ship, and for "poor program management and a poor command climate." The Navy also fired the ship's former Executive Officer, Commander Brandon Murray, and Command Master Chief Richard Holmes. Commander Martin "Marty" Robertson assumed command on 8 April 2016.

In the 13 June 2019 Gulf of Oman incident, Bainbridge responded to a distress signal from Kokuka Courageous, a Japanese oil tanker which caught fire after an apparent explosion while transiting the Gulf of Oman. According to US Defense officials, Bainbridge picked up all 21 crew members who had been rescued by a tugboat.

In May 2022, Bainbridge was homeported out of Naval Station Norfolk and a part of Destroyer Squadron 28, along with Carrier Strike Group 8 led by USS Harry S. Truman.

On 2025, the Bainbridge had been outfitted with Block 3/Coyote LE SR drone launchers.

On 18 February 2026, it was reported to be joining the United States military buildup in the Middle East during the United States–Iran crisis as part of the USS Gerald R. Ford carrier strike group.

=== Awards ===
- Navy Unit Commendation – (8–16 Apr 2009) Maersk Alabama hijacking
- Navy E Ribbon – (2011)
- Arleigh Burke Fleet Trophy – (2011)
