= List of Kenan & Kel episodes =

List of episodes of the 1990s American TV sitcom

Kenan & Kel is an American television sitcom created by Kim Bass that premiered on Nickelodeon on August 17, 1996, and ran for 65 episodes over four seasons. Set in Chicago, Illinois, the series follows the misadventures of two high-school-aged teenagers, Kenan Rockmore (Kenan Thompson) and Kel Kimble (Kel Mitchell). Episodes typically begin with the events leading to and, subsequently, the consequences of Kenan's half-thought-out scams, which the nimble-minded foil Kel invariably follows. Other major characters in the series include Kenan's parents, his younger sister, and his boss at Rigby's, a local grocery store. The series finale, a television film titled Two Heads Are Better Than None, aired on July 15, 2000.

== Series overview ==
Season	Episodes	Originally released	
Season	Episodes	First released	Last released
1	14	August 17, 1996	January 11, 1997
2	13	September 6, 1997	December 27, 1997
3	22	October 10, 1998	May 8, 1999
4	16	August 7, 1999	January 14, 2001

== Episodes ==
=== Season 1 (1996–97) ===
No. overall	No. in season	Title	Directed by	Written by	Original release date	Prod. code	U.S. households (millions)
1	1	"Pilot"	Alan Rosen	Story by : Kim Bass; Teleplay by : Kim Bass and Dan Schneider	August 17, 1996	100	N/A
In the series' pilot, 15-year old Kenan Rockmore (Kenan Thompson) and his best friend Kel Kimble (Kel Mitchell) make several attempts to raise money in order to buy a car, including selling Kel's vintage Skunkator comic books with the help of Kenan's boss, Chris (Dan Frischman), and even luring potential car sellers to Kenan's house. Unfortunately, both of their plans fail miserably. A few days later at Kenan's workplace, Rigby's, the boys are offered a car for just $400, which they gleefully accept. However, after learning from the police that they have just entered into an agreement with a car thief, Kenan and Kel cooperate with the police in order to bring the thief to justice, in exchange for being let off the hook. In the end, the car thief is arrested, however Kenan still manages to be busted by his parents, Roger (Ken Foree) and Sheryl (Teal Marchande).
2	2	"Mental Kel-Epathy"	Kim Fields Freeman	Kevin Kopelow & Heath Seifert	October 12, 1996	103	1.84
After revealing the personal information of others and seemingly predicting the future, everyone becomes convinced that Kel possesses psychic abilities. Although this all turns out to be a coincidence, Kenan plots to use this misinformation to his advantage by booking Kel as a guest on a local daytime talk show, in an attempt to gain fame. However, despite Kenan's best efforts, a frazzled Kel eventually cracks under the pressure and reveals he is not actually psychic, ruining Kenan's plan and leading to chaos ensuing on the talk show.
3	3	"Doing Things the Hemingway"	Brian Robbins	Kevin Kopelow & Heath Seifert	October 19, 1996	102	2.00
Feeling inspired by Ernest Hemingway, Kenan devises three life goals in order to make his life more complete, two of which being to climb the tallest structure in Chicago and to declare his love for his crush, Brianna. Looking to accomplish both goals immediately, Kenan brings Kel along with him as they climb to the top of the Sears Tower, where Kenan plans to hang a giant banner declaring his love for Brianna. While at the top of the building, however, the boys manage to get themselves stuck inside a window washer's lift, eventually prompting them to call Roger for help.
4	4	"The Tainting of the Screw"	Alan Rosen	Dan Schneider	October 26, 1996	101	N/A
Kenan chokes on an errant screw in his tuna sandwich and decides to sue the manufacturing company, Luna Tuna, for the sum of $10,000,000 on the suggestion of a lawyer. As a counteroffer, the company's president presents Kenan with a wealthy cash settlement of $1,000,000 – and a lifetime supply of tuna – that he greedily refuses, prompting all parties to prepare for court. In court, Kenan decides to represent himself and urges Kel to testify on his behalf, seeing as Kel was with Kenan during the initial incident, while also believing that he has an open and shut case. However, during the trial, Kel becomes suddenly racked with guilt and reveals that he was the one who accidentally dropped the screw in the tuna while preparing Kenan's sandwich, which unfortunately ruins Kenan's entire case.
5	5	"Mo' Sweater Blues"	Malcolm-Jamal Warner	Kevin Kopelow & Heath Seifert	November 2, 1996	105	2.49
Kenan finally works up the nerve to ask his crush, Brianna, out on a date, which she accepts. Later that evening at the Rockmore house, Kel accidentally makes a mess on Brianna's sweater, which was knitted and gifted to Brianna by her deceased grandmother. Now panicked, Kenan has Kel and his little sister Kyra (Vanessa Baden) – who Kel is babysitting – come to the date with he and Brianna in an effort to make things right. The boys then spend the entire night trying to clean the sweater without Brianna finding out, unfortunately making matters worse at every turn.
6	6	"The Cold War"	Brian Robbins	Sharon Sussman & Burt Wheeler	November 9, 1996	107	2.22
Kel comes down with a massive head cold which annoys everyone, especially Kenan. Fed up with Kel's constant sneezing and coughing, Kenan inadvertently succeeds in inventing a cure for Kel's cold. Kenan then plans to use his homemade cure to gain fortune and fame; in their excitement, however, the boys realize that they never wrote down the recipe. In trying to replicate it, Kenan and Kel instead create a concoction that causes extreme drowsiness in those who drink it, including Roger – who just so happens to be an air traffic controller.
7	7	"Duh Bomb"	Kim Fields Freeman	Linda M. Yearwood	November 16, 1996	104	2.32
After the boys are teased by two older teenagers for being too young to get into a local nightclub, Kenan decides that he and Kel will create their own club at Rigby's after-hours called "Duh Bomb". Kyra soon finds out their plans, and Kenan agrees to let her attend, on the grounds that she will not tell their parents. Meanwhile, Kel hits it off with a very attractive girl named Leanne, leading to the two dancing together at the club, which upsets a jealous Kyra, who herself has a massive crush on Kel. All in all, the night seems to go well – until the local fire marshall pays a visit.
8	8	"Twizzles Fizzles"	Tony Singletary	Dan Schneider and Kevin Kopelow & Heath Seifert	November 23, 1996	113	N/A
While Roger and Sheryl are away for the weekend, Kenan and Kel are left in charge of the house and are tasked with watching over Roger's beloved pet cockatoo, Twizzles. However, after finding that Twizzles has dropped dead due to their negligence, the boys desperately scramble to find an identical replacement bird before Roger and Sheryl return home.
9	9	"Dial 'O' for Oops"	Kim Fields Freeman	Kevin Kopelow & Heath Seifert	November 30, 1996	109	2.14
Kenan develops a crush on Amy, the daughter of Roger's mean-spirited boss, Mr. Dawson. When Kenan plans to ask Amy out, however, Roger forbids him from doing so. Despite this, Kenan attempts to ask Amy out anyway. While calling her, Kenan and Kel inadvertently leave a scandalous message on the family's answering machine, wherein the boys take turns making fun of Mr. Dawson and talking about how much Roger hates his boss, which could potentially land Roger into serious trouble. Now panicked, the boys then go to the Dawson's home to swap the answering machine tape with a different tape before anyone can hear it. Despite their best efforts, Kenan and Kel are caught and Mr. Dawson hears Roger's true feelings towards him. However, it's revealed during the show close that Mr. Dawson was suddenly transferred to Alaska for work, forcing the Dawsons to move and allowing Roger to keep his job.
10	10	"Baggin' Saggin' Kel"	Howard Storm	Neal Brennan & Ross Venokur	December 7, 1996	111	2.32
It's time for the annual "Grocery Bag-Off" between Rigby's and their main rival, Angus' Food Barn, with the loser having to work in the winner's store while wearing a wedding dress. Initially worried that they will lose the bag-off once again, Kenan and Chris soon discover that Kel has an amazing talent for bagging groceries quickly, giving Rigby's a chance at winning the contest. Problems soon arise, however, when Angus (Dan Schneider) offers Kel a salary of $50 a day to come work for him instead, which Kel initially declines. However, after Kel breaks down due to the pressure of the upcoming contest, he and Kenan devise a plan which sees the boys actually stage an argument with each other in view of both Chris and Angus, resulting in Kel accepting Angus' job offer. On the day of the contest, Kenan and Kel go head-to-head, eventually leading to Kel seemingly passing out from exhaustion. This allows Kenan to take advantage and he ultimately wins the contest for Rigby's, forcing Angus to wear a wedding dress. In the end, Kenan and Kel reveal their ruse to Chris, and the trio celebrate their victory.
11	11	"Merry Christmas, Kenan"	Brian Robbins	Dan Schneider	December 14, 1996	110	2.45
Christmas is fast approaching, and Kenan realizes he needs only a few more dollars in order to purchase a brand-new mountain bike – a Christmas gift to himself. While at the mall one day, Kenan, on the urging of Kel, agrees to play the role of Santa Claus at the mall for the day to earn some extra cash after the original Santa Claus storms out and quits; Kel also lands a job as Santa's "elf". During their shift at the mall, Kenan and Kel meet a boy who says his only Christmas wish is for his little sister to get a new bike. After further learning from the chlidrens' mother that her daughter's bike was stolen and that she has no money to buy her daughter a new one, Kenan is moved and inspired to make the family's wishes come true, learning the true meaning of Christmas in the process. Note: For the only time in the series, the entire cast (on stage for the goodnight) says Kel's traditional show opening/closing line, "Aw, here it goes!"
12	12	"Diamonds Are for Roger"	Malcolm-Jamal Warner	Dan Schneider	December 28, 1996	106	N/A
While watching a television show called "America's Criminals", Kenan and Kel notice an uncanny resemblance between Roger and a serial jewel thief known as "The Diamond Bandit". Their suspicions grow even further when the boys find diamond earrings that Roger has bought as an anniversary present for Sheryl hidden inside the house, assuming they are stolen. In the hopes of clearing Roger's name, Kenan and Kel attempt to return the earrings to the jewelry store after-hours, inadvertently meeting the real Diamond Bandit in the process.
13	13	"Safe and Sorry"	Howard Storm	Eric Bowers	January 4, 1997	112	2.45
While spring cleaning down in Rigby's basement, Kenan and Kel discover a map of the building which Kenan believes leads to a safe filled with riches, while Kel believes the map leads to a sofa. However, events soon take a strange turn when a mysterious man begins showing up at Rigby's asking for something that belongs to his boss, which the boys believe to be the map. Convinced that they may be targeted by mobsters, Kenan and Kel become extremely paranoid and let their fear overcome them – until they ultimately learn the truth. Guest star: Robert Costanzo as Mr. Maniaci.
14	14	"In the Line of Kenan"	Kim Fields Freeman	Paul Dell & Steven Weiss	January 11, 1997	108	1.99
When the President of the United States visits Rigby's, Kenan saves him from a falling display of orange soda cans. After the President expresses his gratitude by telling the boys that they are welcome to the White House anytime, Kenan and Kel decide to take him up on his offer and accompany Roger to Washington – who just so happens to be traveling there for a business trip. While visiting the President, Kenan and Kel manage to cause a diplomatic incident and accidentally destroy the President's prized photo of he and Elvis Presley, leading to complete chaos around the White House. Guest star: Kurt Loder as himself.

=== Season 2 (1997) ===
No. overall	No. in season	Title	Directed by	Written by	Original release date	Prod. code	U.S. households (millions)
15	1	"Pair-Rental Guidance"	Kim Fields Freeman	Kevin Kopelow & Heath Seifert	September 6, 1997	214	2.21
When Kenan and Kel's school principal, Mrs. Dimly, suddenly calls the Rockmore house and requests a meeting with Roger and Sheryl, Kenan automatically fears the worst. However, thanks to an off-hand comment by Kel, Kenan decides to hire actors to stand in for Roger and Sheryl, as a surefire way to avoid any real consequences. At the meeting, Kenan's worries are quickly dashed when it turns out Principal Dimly simply wanted to give praise to Kenan for his impeccable grades. All in all, things seem to go smoothly, until the actress playing Sheryl suddenly invites Principal Dimly to the Rockmores' house for dinner the following night. Now backed into a corner, Kenan is forced to take his ruse even further, leading to chaos all around.
16	2	"Clowning Around"	Kim Fields Freeman	Magda Liolis	September 13, 1997	218	2.25
When Chris leaves Kenan and Kel in charge of Rigby's for the day, the boys are promptly tricked by a circus clown who then proceeds to rob the store. Meanwhile, the Rockmores begin planning Kyra's birthday party, where Kyra hopes to impress a fellow classmate named Megan, who also happens to be the most popular girl in her class. On the day of Kyra's party, Kenan and Kel notice that the clown who was hired as the entertainment is strikingly similar in appearance to the clown that previously robbed them. Panicked, the boys try to determine if it is indeed the same clown by using their only clue – a rather peculiar sneeze. Elsewhere at the party, Megan continuously puts down Kyra and also develops a crush on Kel, infuriating Kyra to no end and eventually prompting her to retaliate.
17	3	"The Lottery"	Kim Fields Freeman	Dan Schneider	September 20, 1997	219	N/A
Rigby's begins selling lottery tickets in an effort to drum up business. Kenan and Chris then decide to each buy their own ticket and play along. After Kenan then convinces a skeptical Kel to do the same, Kel shockingly ends up winning the $64,000,000 jackpot. Unfortunately, though, Kel manages to lose the ticket before he can collect the money. After initially accepting defeat, the boys suddenly realize that Kel accidentally dropped the ticket inside Mrs. Quagmire's grocery bag earlier in the day. The boys then go to Mrs. Quagmire's house late at night in an attempt to retrieve the ticket before she can find it.
18	4	"The Crush"	Kim Fields-Freeman	Dan Schneider	September 27, 1997	216	2.57
Ms. Horn (played by the episode's director, Kim Fields) substitutes for Kenan and Kel's english teacher. After learning that Kenan did not do his assigned book report, Ms. Horn keeps Kenan after class to scold him and encourage him to do better, which ultimately leads to Kel catching the two in a seemingly compromising position. This, along with similar misunderstandings, leads Kel to mistakenly believe that Ms. Horn has a crush on Kenan. Although he completely brushes it off at first, eventually, Kenan himself begins to wonder if Ms. Horn is attracted to him – until he discovers the truth.
19	5	"Who Loves Orange Soda?"	Keith Truesdell	Sharon Sussman & Burt Wheeler	October 4, 1997	220	2.26
After injuring his ribs, an x-ray reveals that's Kel's insides have turned bright orange, due to his unhealthy obsession with orange soda. Upon hearing this, Kenan then makes a bet with Kel that he can't go one week without drinking orange soda, with the loser having to sing the national anthem inside Rigby's while wearing a woman's nightgown. After almost caving on more than one occasion, a desperate Kel decides to seek help from a hypnotist on the suggestion of Chris. At the hypnotist's office, however, Kenan stealthily switches Kel's personal information with that of a dog's, resulting in a very unusual ending to the boys' bet.
20	6	"A Star is Peeved"	Ken Ceizler	Steve Holland	October 11, 1997	222	2.52
Rigby's is chosen as a filming location for the new action movie, "Supermarket Cop 3", and Kenan and Kel manage to land roles as extras. Chris is also excited, seeing as he will be paid a wealthy amount of money by the movie's director in exchange for Rigby's being used for filiming. However, Kenan and Kel's excitement completely takes over, causing the boys to ruin several scenes and get on the wrong side of the film's star, Buck Savage.
21	7	"Ditch Day Afternoon"	Kim Fields Freeman	Kevin Kopelow & Heath Seifert	October 18, 1997	217	N/A
After drawing the ire of their spanish teacher, Ms. Queso, Kenan and Kel are forced to sing a song entirely in spanish in front of their class that Friday as punishment. On top of this, Kel then inadvertently ropes Kenan into helping Chris with inventory at Rigby's that same Friday, seeing as it is only a half-day of school and Kenan will be free for the whole afternoon. Desperate for a way out, Kenan decides to ditch both school and work by feigning an illness, dragging a reluctant Kel along with him. All seemingly goes well, until the boys are suddenly taken hostage in a bank robbery. When TV news crews soon arrive on the scene, Kenan is forced to keep the robbery going for as long as possible to prevent he and Kel from getting caught.
22	8	"Get the Kel Outta Here"	Mary Schmid	Dan Schneider and Kevin Kopelow & Heath Seifert	October 25, 1997	223	1.86
After Kel causes Roger one injury too many, Roger officially bans Kel from the Rockmore house, much to the rest of the family's protest. Kel, with the help of Kenan, then tries to apologize to Roger, who repeatedly rejects him, especially since Kel's attempts only result in Roger becoming further injured. In the end, Kel's final apology attempt causes Roger to hit his head on a tree while chasing Kel. The resulting injury causes Roger to conveniently forget the entire situation, thus allowing Kel into the Rockmore home once again.
23	9	"Foul Bull"	Ken Ceizler	Steve Freeman	November 1, 1997	221	2.26
The Chicago Bulls's season is put into serious jeopardy when Ron Harper injures his knee after slipping on a puddle of orange soda at Rigby's, which was inadvertently caused by Kenan and Kel. Furious, the entire city of Chicago rallies against Kenan and Kel, who seek to rectify the situation by any means necessary – including sneaking into the hospital where Ron Harper is staying and begging for his forgiveness. Guest star: Kurt Loder as himself.
24	10	"I Haven't Got Time for the Paint"	Howard Storm	Dan Schneider and Kevin Kopelow & Heath Seifert	November 8, 1997	226	2.48
Kel is revealed to be a very talented artist after his art class painting sells for $5,000 at a local auction. Seeking fortune and fame, Kenan then decides to take advantage of his friend's newfound talent, forcing Kel to paint an entire art collection for an auction Kenan sets up at Rigby's. On the day of the auction, however, the boys learn of an unfortunate misunderstanding that could put their plan in serious jeopardy.
25	11	"Turkey Day"	Kim Fields Freeman	Alex Reid	November 19, 1997	215	N/A
It's Thanksgiving, and Roger has spent all morning cooking a turkey for the entire Rockmore family. While Roger and Sheryl are away, however, Kel impulsively eats the entire turkey all by himself, leading he and Kenan on a desperate search for a replacement turkey before Roger and Sheryl return and before Kenan's relatives arrive. Guest star: Whitman Mayo as Uncle Raymond.
26	12	"Bye Bye Kenan: Part 1"	Brian Robbins	Dan Schneider and Kevin Kopelow & Heath Seifert	December 20, 1997	224	N/A
When Roger finally lands his dream job as a mountain ranger, Kenan and Kel must come to terms with the fact that Kenan and his family will be moving away to Pummis, Montana and what this will do to their friendship. On the day of the move, Kel goes to retrieve a special going away present for Kenan, which sees Kel desperately attempt to return to the Rockmore house before the family leaves.
27	13	"Bye Bye Kenan: Part 2"	Brian Robbins	Dan Schneider and Kevin Kopelow & Heath Seifert	December 27, 1997	225	N/A
Kel makes a surprise visit to the Rockmores in Pummis, where he finds the family miserable in their new house, Kenan unhappy with his new school and Roger bored with his new job. When Roger refuses to quit his job due to loyalty, however, Kenan realizes the only way to set things right is to sabotage his father at work. With the help of Kenan's new neighbor, Cleeb, the boys then devise a plan to get Roger fired, so the Rockmores can move back to Chicago.

=== Season 3 (1998–99) ===
No. overall	No. in season	Title	Directed by	Written by	Original release date	Prod. code	U.S. households (millions)
28	1	"Fenced In"	Kim Fields Freeman	Kevin Kopelow & Heath Seifert	October 10, 1998	327	N/A
Kenan and Kel land dates with girls whose biggest concern is punctuality. Because of this, Kenan decides that he and Kel will leave hours ahead of schedule, so that they are guaranteed to be on time. Along the way, however, Kenan gets his head stuck in a fence after attempting to retrieve a yo-yo Kel has bought for his date. With time rapidly running out, the boys desperately try to free Kenan from the fence before it's too late.
29	2	"Skunkator vs. Mothman"	Kim Fields Freeman	Alex Reid	October 17, 1998	330	N/A
Kel invites Kenan to a comic book convention, where Kenan hopes to purchase the missing issue of his favorite superhero, Skunkator, in order to complete his collection. However, Kenan is suddenly tasked by Chris with training Rigby's newest employee, Sharla Morrison (Alexis Fields) on the same day as the convention. Hoping to accomplish both tasks at the same time, Kenan decides to "train" Sharla as quickly as possible, so he and Kel can sneak off to the convention, leaving Sharla on her own with little to no clue as to how anything works. Meanwhile, at the convention, the boys spot Chris and must avoid him, leading to disastrous results all around. Note: This episode marks the first appearance of Sharla, played by Alexis Fields, who is the younger sister of actress and frequent series' director, Kim Fields.
30	3	"The Raffle"	Kim Fields Freeman	Wayne Conley	October 24, 1998	329	N/A
Looking to increase business, Chris decides to hold a raffle at Rigby's where the grand prize is a brand-new television set. Meanwhile, Roger and Sheryl buy a new high-quality television set for the Rockmore house. When Chris's TV is delivered to Rigby's, however, Kel accidentally destroys it while attempting to retrieve his balloon. Kenan then plots to replace the broken TV with his parents' new TV and rig the raffle so that Kel wins, ensuring that the TV will be safely returned to the Rockmores. Unfortunately, though, Kel accidentally drops his half of the winning ticket into the ticket drum, allowing someone else to win the Rockmores' TV. Now panicked, Kenan and Kel go on a desperate hunt to replace the set before Roger and Sheryl can find out.
31	4	"The Chicago Witch Trials"	Virgil L. Fabian	Kevin Kopelow and Heath Seifert	October 29, 1998	331	2.33
Kel develops a crush on the new girl in school, Becky (Linda Cardellini); Kenan, however, suspects Becky is a witch who has cursed him with bad luck and sets out to free himself from the supposed hex. Things then come to a head when Kenan and Kel agree to meet Becky and Sharla for a double date at Becky's house.
32	5	"To Catch a Thief"	Kim Fields Freeman	Steve Holland	November 7, 1998	328	N/A
After meeting his new neighbor Marc Cram (Biagio Messina), Kenan awakens the next morning to find his wristwatch - gifted to him by Roger - missing. After discovering Marc's massive love of collecting watches, Kenan suspects that his new neighbor may actually be the thief. With Kel at his side, Kenan sets out to prove his suspicions by any means necessary – including breaking into the Cram household.
33	6	"Attack of the Bug Men"	Kim Fields Freeman	Alex Reid	November 14, 1998	336	N/A
To celebrate Kyra's exceptional grades in school, the Rockmores decide to have dinner at Pizza Farm. Before they can join the rest of the family, however, Kenan and Kel become determined to finish an intense matchup of a board game entitled "Penguin Hunter". While doing so, the boys inadvertently allow two burglars – posing as exterminators – to steal everything on the ground floor of the Rockmores' home. Kenan must then keep his increasingly frustrated family at Pizza Farm for as long as possible, while the police track down the stolen property. Guest stars: Kevin Shinick as robber, Rondell Sheridan as Officer McWiggan, Doug Jones as Patrick the Waiter.
34	7	"I.Q. Can Do Better"	Kim Fields Freeman	Wayne Conley	November 28, 1998	334	N/A
After Kenan and Kel receive a score of 3 and a score of 96, respectively, on an I.Q. test at school, the boys pay a visit to Principal Dimly's office after-hours to find out the truth. After learning the truth and finding out their correct scores, all seems well, until the boys realize that they have accidentally left an incriminating doodle of the principal – drawn by Kenan – on her desk, prompting Kenan and Kel to break into the principal's office in order to retrieve it.
35	8	"Surprise, Surprise"	Kim Fields Freeman	Daka Hermon	December 5, 1998	333	N/A
Roger is planning a surprise anniversary party for Sheryl, and tasks Kenan and Kel with collecting the cake and the bracelet he has bought for her as a gift while they are out to dinner. After Kel causes massive damage at both the jewelry store and the bakery, the boys accidentally destroy the cake upon returning home, forcing them to bake an entirely new one from scratch. While making the cake, however, Kel accidentally drops Sheryl's bracelet into the batter, baking it inside the cake. Now panicked, the boys attempt to set everything right before Roger finds out.
36	9	"You Dirty Rat"	Virgil L. Fabian	Gregory Shelton	December 12, 1998	335	N/A
When a rat infiltrates Rigby's and starts scaring away customers, Kenan, Chris and Sharla all vote to have it exterminated, much to the protest of Kel, who has named the rat "Wendell". Eventually, Kel persuades Kenan to save the rat as well, and the boys attempt to catch and save Wendell before Chris can have the rat exterminated.
37	10	"Freezer Burned"	Kim Fields Freeman	Jerry Colker	January 2, 1999	337	N/A
After Kel ruins their family dinner, the Rockmores decide to eat out at a pirate-themed restaurant. At the restaurant, Kel wins he and the Rockmores free dinner after he successfully drinks a huge amount of orange soda in record time. However, when Kel then excuses himself to use the restroom, he accidentally runs into a waiter, inadvertently switching around a sign on the wall in the process. This mishap leads to not only Kel, but all inhabitants of the restaurant becoming trapped inside the restaurant's walk-in freezer. As the night progresses, everyone grows increasingly furious at Kel (and, by association, Kenan), who constantly finds a way to make the situation worse. Guest stars: Joyce Brothers as herself, Oliver Muirhead as Gavin the waiter, T. J. Thyne as hysterical guy.
38	11	"Present Tense"	Kim Fields Freeman	Kevin Kopelow & Heath Seifert	January 9, 1999	341	N/A
Kenan's 17th birthday is fast approaching, and curiosity over what his parents' gift might be takes over. While searching for his gift, Kenan and Kel find a cheap snow globe, which a disappointed Kenan believes to be his parents' gift. The boys then proceed to accidentally break the snow globe, leading them to replace it before Roger and Sheryl can find out. Eventually, it's revealed that the snow globe in question was actually intended as a gift for Kenan's Uncle Louie, whom Kenan and Kel have given Kenan's actual birthday present – Roger's prized baseball signed by Babe Ruth. Guest star: Johnny Brown as Uncle Louie.
39	12	"Housesitter"	Virgil L. Fabian	Steve Holland	January 16, 1999	342	N/A
While Chris is away for the weekend, he asks Kenan and Kel to tend to his plants and his pet goldfish. However, the boys forget to do so until the day Chris is scheduled to come back. In their desperate scramble to make everything right at the last minute, the boys instead end up making everything worse, including allowing Chris's plants to die, ruining his goldfish's tank, breaking his kitchen sink, flooding his bathroom, and even starting a house fire.
40	13	"Happy B-Day Marc"	Kim Fields Freeman	Steve Holland	January 23, 1999	339	N/A
Kenan refuses to go to Marc's "lame" birthday party, even going so far as to intentionally avoid Marc so that he will not receive an invitation. However, Kenan soon takes it personally when he learns that he is the only one in school that Marc did not invite. A spiteful Kenan then hatches a scheme to get back at his neighbor. Unbeknownst to Kenan, however, Sharla has given Marc a rather unusual explanation as to why Kenan cannot attend his party, which could cause Kenan's revenge plot to massively backfire.
41	14	"Picture Imperfect"	Kim Fields Freeman	Amy Berg & Daka Hermon	February 6, 1999	343	N/A
After Kel accidentally destroys the yearbook photos of all students with surnames beginning with A-L, Kenan, Kel and Marc are left with no choice but to re-take all of the students' photos by Friday, in order to meet the yearbook deadline. In order to achieve this, Kenan arranges a photo op at Rigby's with Bill Bellamy, who is currently in Chicago filming a movie, without his consent. After eventually convincing Bill to help them out, all seems to go well – until Kel accidentally messes up the photos once again.
42	15	"Clothes Encounters"	Virgil L. Fabian	Andrew Hirsch	February 20, 1999	345	N/A
While at the mall to purchase a new video game, Kenan is dragged into a clothing store by Kel. While there, Kenan flirts with the store's cashier, Rudy, before trying on some new – albeit unflattering – clothes she picks out for him. After Rudy overhears Kenan insulting her fashion sense, however, Kenan manages to get locked out of his dressing room in only his shirt and underwear while trying to apologize. Eventually, this leads to another customer actually purchasing Kenan's original clothes, forcing Kenan to sneak home in only his t-shirt and underwear.
43	16	"We Are the Chimpions"	Virgil L. Fabian	Steve Freeman	March 6, 1999	338	3.10
Kenan and Kel adopt Charles, a chimpanzee from the local zoo. However, when the boys then find out that Charles is to be transferred to another zoo, Kel kidnaps Charles out of protest. Kenan and Kel are then forced to cover when Charles begins wreaking havoc at both Rigby's and Kenan's house, while Kenan simultaneously calls the zoo in the hopes of giving Charles back.
44	17	"I'm Gonna Get You Kenan"	Virgil L. Fabian	Wayne Conley	March 13, 1999	346	N/A
Kenan is hailed as a local hero in Chicago after – unknowingly – incapacitating notorious criminal John "The Jackhammer" Rogan (Joe Rose), leading to the criminal's arrest. However, Kenan's pride and arrogance soon turns to paranoia and fear when the Jackhammer quickly escapes custody and vows revenge on Kenan.
45	18	"The Limo"	Virgil L. Fabian	Kevin Kopelow & Heath Seifert	March 20, 1999	347	N/A
In order to impress Melissa, a rich girl, Kenan pretends to also be rich, even going so far as to hire a limo in order to take her on a date. After Kel rides along with Kenan to Melissa's house, however, Kel manages to accidentally knock the limo driver out cold. This leaves the boys with no other option but to have Kel take the driver's place, leading to disastrous results.
46	19	"The Contest"	Howard Storm	Chris Brown	March 27, 1999	332	N/A
Kenan and Kel enter a local radio contest, where whoever performs the most dangerous stunt will win courtside tickets to the upcoming Chicago Bulls game, with Kenan nominating Kel as the stuntman so that they can win the two tickets. However, upon learning that Kel would only receive one ticket should he win (the other ticket would be given to the runner-up), Kenan finds himself forced to perform the dangerous stunt along with Kel in order to win both tickets.
47	20	"He Got Job"	Virgil L. Fabian	Steve Holland	April 3, 1999	348	N/A
After Chris refuses him any more orange soda without paying for it, Kel decides to finally get a job. With Kenan's help, Kel lands a job at a local donut shop called "Stale's Donuts". After Kel suggests the idea of a peanut butter and jelly-filled donut to his boss (which was originally suggested to him by Kenan), Kel receives a $500 bonus in his paycheck once the idea is proven to be wildly successful. Once Kenan learns of this, he and Kel then decide to spend the entire night at the donut shop, creating more unique donuts in the hopes for more money.
48	21	"Poem Sweet Poem"	Kim Fields Freeman	Kevin Kopelow & Heath Seifert	April 17, 1999	340	N/A
Lovebirds Phillip (Josh Server) and Allison break up after Allison reads a romantic poem Kenan wrote for Sharla, with Allison believing it was written by Phillip. Upon learning this, a guilt-ridden Kenan writes another poem in an attempt to get the two back together and tasks Kel with delivering it. However, after Allison catches Kel sneaking the poem into her locker, Kel mistakenly lets it slip to her that Kenan was the one who wrote the poem, causing Allison to fall madly in love with Kenan. Meanwhile, as Kenan tries to rectify the whole situation, Phillip swears to find the one Allison left him for and exact revenge.
49	22	"Who Loves Who-ooh?"	Virgil L. Fabian	Nick Cannon, Mason Gordon, and Kenan Thompson	May 8, 1999	344	N/A
Kenan tries to build up courage to ask Sharla to the Sweetheart's Ball. Once he attempts to do so, however, Kenan panics and says that he is actually going to the dance with R&B star Tamia, whom he then has to convince to go with him. Unbeknownst to Kenan, this deeply upsets Sharla, who had wanted Kenan to ask her to the dance all along. Meanwhile, Kel begins receiving numerous gifts from a secret admirer who says she will meet him at the dance.

=== Season 4 (1999–2001) ===
No. overall	No. in season	Title	Directed by	Written by	Original release date	Prod. code	U.S. households (millions)
50	1	"Corporate Kenan"	Virgil L. Fabian	Steve Holland	July 31, 1999	449	N/A
Feeling inspired by his father's successful friend, Kenan decides to quit his job at Rigby's and apply for a mail room job at a big corporation, hoping to move up in the world. At the job interview, however, a mix-up with his résumé – thanks in large part to Kel – sees Kenan mistakenly hired as executive vice president of the company instead. Initially excited, Kenan soon finds his new responsibilities daunting – particularly as he has no idea what the company even does. After being tasked with speaking at an upcoming presentation and realizing he's in too deep, Kenan desperately searches for a way out before it's too late. Meanwhile, Kel manages to land a job as Kenan's "executive assistant" and begins wreaking havoc around the office.
51	2	"The Honeymoon's Over"	Kim Fields Freeman	Wayne Conley	August 7, 1999	450	N/A
Fed up with having no privacy in his own home, Kenan – thanks to an off-hand comment by his cousin, Eric – schemes to appear on the game show "The Honeymoon's Over", where newlywed couples compete for the chance to win a brand-new house. Realizing he needs a partner, however, Kenan ropes Kel into going on the show with him posing as his wife, "Kelly". Guest star: Bob Eubanks as himself.
52	3	"Girl-Watchers"	Kim Fields Freeman	Steve Holland	August 14, 1999	451	N/A
After Kenan and Kel pick up Eric's girlfriend, Melissa, at the airport, Kel accidentally knocks her unconscious with her suitcase. When she awakes, Melissa runs away from the two and falls in with a local motorcycle gang. Believing that Melissa has suffered amnesia, Kenan and Kel attempt to get her back and restore Melissa's memory before Eric finds out. In the end, however, Eric introduces everyone to the REAL Melissa – leading to the boys to realize that they picked up the wrong girl from the airport.
53	4	"Car Trouble"	Virgil L. Fabian	Kevin Kopelow & Heath Seifert	August 21, 1999	452	N/A
Kenan wants to get his driver's license, but Roger and Sheryl forbid him from doing so until his 18th birthday. Contrary to his parents' wishes, however, Kenan attempts to get his driver's license anyway. Along the way, Kenan convinces Marc to loan him his father's car and ropes Chris into coming along as Kenan's "legal guardian". However, Kenan realizes at the last minute that he has neglected a very important science project, which is due on the same day as his driver's exam. After staying up all night to finish his project, Kenan becomes severely sleep-deprived, leading to disastrous results at the DMV.
54	5	"Three Girls, a Guy and a Cineplex"	Virgil L. Fabian	Amy Berg	August 28, 1999	454	N/A
Kenan makes a date with Sharla, agreeing to take her to the movies as an apology for unintentionally standing her up on their date the night before. Later that evening, Kenan impulsively makes a date with Caitlin, the daughter of family friends, agreeing to also take her to the movies. Realizing his mistake, Kenan desperately tries to keep both girls from discovering each other, while also keeping his commitments. Meanwhile, Kel sets up a double date at the movies for he and Kenan with two girls named Wanda and Yovanda (Guest star The Lady of Rage), whom Kenan must also avoid.
55	6	"Natural Born Kenan"	Linda Mendoza	Kevin Kopelow & Heath Seifert and Sal Maniaci	September 11, 1999	455	N/A
While down in the Rockmores' basement, Kenan realizes that he is unable to find anything of his from when he was a baby. Upon telling his parents this, Roger and Sheryl explain to Kenan that a flood in their basement years prior ruined all of his possessions. Despite this, Kenan begins to suspect that Roger and Sheryl may not actually be his birth parents, and that he may have been switched at birth. Kenan's suspicions grow even further when he finds out that there is someone in Chicago named Kevin Rockmore, who was born on the same day, at the same time and in the exact same hospital as Kenan. As Kenan sets out to meet who he believes is his true parents, he comes to realize how much Sheryl and Roger really mean to him in the process.
56	7	"Aww, Here It Goes to Hollywood"	Virgil L. Fabian	Kevin Kopelow & Heath Seifert	September 25, 1999	457	N/A
57	8	"Aww, Here It Goes to Hollywood"	Virgil L. Fabian	Kevin Kopelow & Heath Seifert	September 25, 1999	458	2.01
After the Rockmores win a trip to any destination they choose via a radio contest, Kel ropes them into attending the "European Orange Soda Festival" in Amsterberg, much to the family's dismay. At the airport, however, Kenan and Kel manage to board the wrong plane and end up in Los Angeles, California. While waiting for the next flight out to Amsterberg, the boys decide to explore the city, where they manage to score tickets to a talk show hosted by Downtown Julie Brown. However, after Kel annoys the security guard one too many times, the boys are ultimately denied entry into the taping, prompting them to sneak inside the studio. Once in the building, the boys proceed to cause trouble backstage and evoke the ire of guest stars Bill Bellamy, Britney Spears and David Allen Grier.
58	9	"The Graduates"	Ken Whittingham	Jonathan Green & Gabe Miller	October 9, 1999	456	N/A
After a senior prank involving pudding horribly backfires, Principal Horn (Kim Fields) bans Kenan from attending the school's graduation ceremony. Not wanting to disappoint his family, as well as his relatives who have flown to Chicago, Kenan does all he can to attend the graduation ceremony anyway and keep the truth from them.
59	10	"Oh, Brother"	Kim Fields Freeman	Wayne Conley	October 27, 1999	459	2.29
Chris's very wealthy and very arrogant twin brother, Rick, comes to town. Rick then buys Rigby's outright and fires his brother as his first order of business, leaving Chris with no job and nowhere to live. The Rockmores then agree to take Chris in out of sympathy, but soon find him to be overbearing and annoying. Desperate to get Chris out of their house, the Rockmores then search for a way to convince Rick to leave, so that Chris can have his life back.
60	11	"Futurama"	Kim Fields Freeman	Jonathan Green & Gabe Miller	December 31, 1999	453	N/A
In the year 3000, Kenan attempts to keep his school report card and subsequent bad grades a secret from Roger, in order to avoid punishment. In trying to help his friend, however, Kel accidentally turns Roger invisible by using a gadget designed to disintegrate garbage. After Kel then proceeds to destroy a crucial part of the gadget that would make Roger visible again, the boys go a desperate search around town for a replacement part.
61	12	"The April Fools"	Virgil L. Fabian	Erica Rothschild	April 1, 2000	460	N/A
On April Fool's day, Kenan and Kel go around town pulling increasingly elaborate pranks on everyone they know, including each other. Unfortunately, this inadvertently sets off a chain of events which ultimately leads to everyone involved being arrested – just as an important college recruiter is set to visit Kenan at his home. Note: Last appearances of Sharla Morrison and Marc Cram.
62	13	"Two Heads Are Better Than None"	Michael Grossman	Kevin Kopelow & Heath Seifert	July 15, 2000	462	N/A
63	14	"Two Heads Are Better Than None"	Michael Grossman	Kevin Kopelow & Heath Seifert	July 15, 2000	463	N/A
64	15	"Two Heads Are Better Than None"	Michael Grossman	Kevin Kopelow & Heath Seifert	July 15, 2000	464	N/A
The Rockmores set off on a family road trip, with Kel stowed away in the back of the car. Along the way, Kenan begins seeing a mysterious man clad in armor, although no one else believes him. After learning of a local legend called "The Headless Knight", who decapitates people and wears their heads as his own, Kenan believes that is who he keeps seeing. When the Rockmores' car breaks down, Kenan and Kel are tasked with going for help, soon reaching the nearby town of Rockville. In Rockville, the boys stumble upon a castle owned by a man named Arthur, who, at first, seems welcoming and benevolent. Soon though, Kenan and Kel learn that Arthur is perpetuating the myth of the Headless Knight in order to serve his own nefarious ends.
65	16	"Tales from the Clip"	Kim Fields Freeman	Kevin Kopelow & Heath Seifert	January 14, 2001	461	N/A
After having a huge fight, Kenan and Kel declare that their friendship is over, much to everyone's protest. In an attempt to bring them back together, the boys are shown clips of all the times, both good and bad, that they have shared together (completely breaking the fourth wall in the process).
