= Tyson's Run =

- Theatrical release poster
- Directed by: Kim Bass
- Written by: Kim Bass
- Produced by: John Cappetta; Kim Bass; Eric Upshur; Deanna Shapiro; Asante White; Bruce Lane
- Starring: Rory Cochrane; Amy Smart; Major Dodson; Layla Felder; Claudia Zevallos; Reno Wilson; Barkhad Abdi
- Cinematography: Bruce Lane
- Edited by: Michael Purl
- Music by: Sean Murray
- Production company: Planet 9 Productions
- Distributed by: Collide Distribution
- Release date: March 11, 2022
- Running time: 103 minutes
- Country: United States
- Language: English
- Box office: $391,426

Tyson's Run is a 2022 American drama film written and directed by Kim Bass and starring Rory Cochrane, Amy Smart, Major Dodson and Barkhad Abdi.

== Plot ==
A teenage autistic boy, Tyson, is homeschooled by his mother Eloise. Tyson’s father, Bobby, is the football coach at Pope High School who was injured in his youth, ending his chances for a career as a professional football player. Bobby is resentful about his inability to connect with Tyson and rarely has any interactions with him.

Over dinner, Tyson recommends that he attend his father's school because Eloise is unable to teach him algebra.

Bobby reluctantly agrees after an argument with his wife. On his first day at public school, Tyson is bullied by a student named Bradley, but makes a friend named Shannon. Eloise finds out she is pregnant and is concerned that the baby will have the same condition as Tyson.

At football practice, Tyson meets and befriends a renowned marathon runner named Aklilu. Eloise has a scare with the baby but is fine. At school, Bradley puts a mirror on the floor to see up a teacher’s skirt and she thinks it was Tyson as he picked up the mirror, sending him out of the class.

Bradley leads the class to believe that it was Tyson who had the mirror and he runs out of the school because of the abuse from his peers.

Tyson is disoriented and almost gets knocked down by a car but is found by Aklilu, who takes him into his athletic shoe shop. Tyson calls his mother to pick him up from the store. Later in the day, Tyson overhears his parents argue about him and runs out into a violent storm 15 miles away from his home. A search party ensues.

Tyson's foot is caught under a fallen tree's branch in a pond and is unable to move. The search party is called off after one of the deputies is bit by a rattle snake. With the water rising quickly, Tyson hears his father and calls out to him. After realizing that he can lose his son, Bobby feels guilty about his treatment towards him and stays with his son in the pond after failed attempts to rescue him. Aklilu finds them both after being called by Eloise.

At the hospital, Tyson is reunited with his mother but he has hypothermia and is put to bed. Tyson recovers quickly and Bobby has opened up more to his son. However, Bobby believes that Tyson's dream to run and win the marathon is unrealistic. Bobby reflects on Tyson as a baby, wanting to be a better father to him.

Bobby decides to be a better father by passing on the State football championship to be there for Tyson's upbringing. Mayor Coleman calls Bobby into his office, citing that Tyson's participation in the race is a mistake, but Bobby is unrelenting and defends his son's chances. Bobby learns that Aklilu was indefinitely expelled due to drug allegations.

At school, Tyson's peers realize their mistake and defends him against Bradley. Bobby stops Aklilu from training Tyson without allowing him to explain. Tyson runs off and confronts Aklilu, who stated that he had a cold on the day of his final race but there was a banned substance in the medicine which he was unaware of.

On the day of the race, Tyson falls but is motivated by the sight of Aklilu and words of his father's encouragement.

Closer to the finish line, Shannon professes her affection to Tyson. He goes on to win the marathon into his parents’ waiting arms while Aklilu cheers from the sidelines. Tyson talks to his baby sister, giving her reassurances that he will be there for her. In a post-credit scene, Bradley tries to dunk him in the toilet, only for him to be dunked himself.

== Cast ==
- Major Dodson as Tyson
- Rory Cochrane as Coach
- Amy Smart as Eloise
- Layla Felder as Shannon
- Claudia Zevallos as Ms Fernandez
- Reno Wilson as Mayor
- Barkhad Abdi as Aklilu
- Isaiah Hanley as Bradley
- Jibre Hordges as Billy Kidman

== Production ==
Principal photography began in Atlanta on July 9, 2018. Filming also occurred in Marietta, Georgia and Stockbridge, Georgia. Bass was unaware that Dodson is on the autism spectrum when he cast him as the autistic character Tyson.

== Release ==
The film was released in select theaters on March 11, 2022.

== Reception ==
In the United States and Canada, the film earned $212,800 from 428 theaters in its opening weekend.

Rick Bentley of KGET-TV awarded the film two and a half stars and wrote, "As a sports movie dealing with marathon running, Tyson’s Run hits the wall in the first act as it just never finds the proper stride or pacing. It does get a few more miles out of the family elements." On review aggregator website Rotten Tomatoes, the film holds an approval rating of 60% based on 5 reviews, with an average rating of 6.10/10.
