= The Pirates of Somalia (film) =

- Theatrical release poster
- Directed by: Bryan Buckley
- Screenplay by: Bryan Buckley
- Produced by: Claude Dal Farra; Irfaan Fredericks; Mino Jarjoura; Matt Lefebvre
- Starring: Evan Peters; Barkhad Abdi; Melanie Griffith; Al Pacino
- Cinematography: Scott Henriksen
- Edited by: Jay Nelson
- Music by: Andrew Feltenstein; John Nau
- Production companies: Hungry Man Productions; BCDF Pictures; Kalahari Pictures
- Distributed by: Echo Bridge
- Release dates: April 27, 2017 (Tribeca Film Festival); December 8, 2017 (United States)
- Running time: 118 minutes
- Country: United States
- Language: English

The Pirates of Somalia (or simply Pirates of Somalia in the UK) is a 2017 American drama film written and directed by Bryan Buckley and based on the 2011 book. The film stars Evan Peters, Al Pacino, Melanie Griffith and Barkhad Abdi. It had its world premiere at the Tribeca Film Festival on April 27, 2017, and was released on December 8, 2017, by Echo Bridge.

== Plot ==
After his graduation from the University of Toronto, journalist Jay Bahadur tries in vain to gain a foothold in the profession. Still living with his parents, he stays afloat with unsatisfactory activity conducting surveys for product placing in supermarkets. His chance comes when his journalistic idol Seymour Tolbin inspires him to realize his dream of journalism, not in a conventional way through a post-graduate university education, but through an exciting mission to investigate the backgrounds of piracy in Somalia.

By contacting various news services in Somalia, Bahadur makes contact with a reporter, Mohamad Farole, whose father is the President of Somalia. They welcome him and provide him with lodgings during his stay. A minder is assigned to him, Abdirizak, known as Abdi. Abdi tells Bahadur about the "badaadinta badah". He describes them as "Saviors of the sea. They are like Coast Guard. You can never call them pirates."

Bahadur's room overlooks a street that leads to the local market. He sees a passing woman, Maryan, who sells khat, a drug that is useful as payment for interviews with alleged pirates. Maryan is also the wife of one of the alleged pirates.

While Bahadur is successful with interviewing two pirates, Boyah and Garaad (the latter Maryan's husband), his reports to Avril Benoit from CBC Radio are not published. Avril tells him that CBC will pay for an interview with hostages on a ship. An attempt is made by Abdi to secure an interview with hostages on the German freighter Victoria, being held in a harbor at Eyl. However, after Bahadur pressures the contacts, the ship leaves overnight.

In the meantime, the story of Captain Phillips and the drama of the Maersk Alabama hijacking unfolds. Bahadur's father and his Somali contacts advise Bahadur that it is no longer safe for him to stay in Somalia.

On his return to Canada, Bahadur is approached by Agent Brice from the Center for Strategic and International Studies (CSIS), seeking insights into the situation in Somalia. There is a family celebration to welcome Bahadur home.

Later, when Bahadur is living in Kenya, he meets with a CSIS committee as they seek his advice through his unique experience. His book about the pirates is a bestseller. Bahadur explains that the Somalis do not need warships off their coast. They need to be recognized for their complex but honorable culture.

== Cast ==
- Evan Peters as Jay Bahadur
- Al Pacino as Seymour Tolbin
- Melanie Griffith as Maria Bahadur
- Barkhad Abdi as Abdi
- Aidan Whytock as Agent Brice
- Kiana Madani as Tracy Ziconni
- Philip Ettinger as Alex
- Darron Meyer as Mitch Kelp
- Russell Posner as Jared Bahadur
- Armaan Haggio as Mohamad Farole Jr.
- Jojo Gonzalez as Jojo
- Maria Vos as Avril Benoît
- Sabrina Hassan as Maryan
- Mohamed Barre as Boyah
- Abdi Sidow Farah as Colonel Omar

== Production ==
On October 20, 2015, it was announced that Bryan Buckley would direct the film, with Evan Peters joining the cast. On February 11, 2016, Al Pacino, Melanie Griffith and Barkhad Abdi joined the cast. Principal photography began in February 2016, and ended on April 24, 2016.

== Release ==
The film had its world premiere at the Tribeca Film Festival on April 27, 2017. Shortly after, Echo Bridge acquired U.S. distribution rights to the film, and set it for a December 8, 2017, release.

The film received generally mixed reviews. It currently holds a 63% rating on Rotten Tomatoes, and a 54% rating on Metacritic.
