= Day of Days (film) =

- Film poster
- Directed by: Kim Bass
- Written by: Kim Bass; Kyle Bass
- Produced by: Deanna Shapiro
- Starring: Tom Skerritt; Claudia Zevallos
- Release dates: November 4, 2016 (Women's International Film & Arts Festival)
- Country: United States
- Language: English

Day of Days is a 2016 American drama film directed by Kim Bass and starring Tom Skerritt and Claudia Zevallos. The film is loosely based on Bass's grandfather, Clarence Bass.

== Cast ==
- Tom Skerritt as Walter Raymond Leland
- Claudia Zevallos as Marisol

== Production ==
The film was shot in Los Angeles in 12 days from late February to early March 2015. Filming wrapped in April 2015.

== Release ==
The film premiered on November 4, 2016, at the 11th Women's International Film & Arts Festival in Miami.

== Accolades ==
Skerritt and Zevallos won best actor awards at the Women's International Film & Arts Festival.
