= Claudia Zevallos =

Peruvian actress

Claudia Zevallos is a Peruvian actress known for her film collaborations with filmmaker Kim Bass, who directed her in Day of Days (2016), Tyson's Run (2022) and A Snowy Day in Oakland (2023). For her performance in Day of Days, she won the Best Actress Award at the Women's International Film & Arts Festival.

== Filmography ==
Year	Title	Role	Notes
2006	Mark(s)	Maria	Short film
2007	Fool for Love	May	Short film
2008	El derecho de Jesús - The Right of Jesús	Esther	
2008	Shelter	Angela Garcia	
2010	Separate Reality	Angel of Death	Short film
2016	A Better Place	Mirabella	
2016	Day of Days	Marisol	
2022	Tyson's Run	Ms. Fernandez	
2023	A Snowy Day in Oakland	Angelica	
