= A Snowy Day in Oakland =

- Directed by: Kim Bass
- Written by: Kim Bass
- Starring: Nicole Ari Parker
- Music by: Nathan East
- Release date: March 17, 2023
- Country: United States
- Language: English

A Snowy Day in Oakland (formerly titled HeadShop) is a 2023 American comedy film written and directed by Kim Bass and starring Nicole Ari Parker.

== Plot ==
A magical urban tale about a beautiful psychologist from San Francisco who decides to end a stalled romance with her longtime, high-profile, psychiatrist, boyfriend/business partner. She moves on with her life by opening her own private practice in a vacant, street-front office space in the middle of a small, commercial block located across the bay in Oakland, turning the predominately African-American and psychologically ignored neighborhood on its emotional ear.

== Cast ==
- Nicole Ari Parker as Dr. Latrice Monroe
- Evan Ross as Rodney Smalls
- Arden Myrin as Shelby Hockman
- Roger Cross as Brother Freeman
- Sean Maguire as Grant
- Loretta Devine as Jeanette
- Reno Wilson as Marquis King
- Kimberly Elise as Theona
- Deon Cole as Davis
- Michael Jai White as Reverend Carter
- Marla Gibbs as Mrs. Keys
- Tony Plana as Jesus Salgado
- Donis Leonard Jr. as Glock 9
- Claudia Zevallos as Angelica
- Keith David as Mr. Monroe
- Jackée Harry as Mrs. Monroe

== Production ==
Principal photography occurred in Los Angeles in July 2017. Filming also occurred in San Francisco in August 2017.

Kris Marshall was originally cast in the film. However, Sean Maguire replaced him after Marshall was forced to pull out of the film due to an ankle injury.

The film was in post-production in 2022 before being released in 2023.

== Release ==
The film was originally scheduled to be released in theaters on January 13, 2023. The release date was then moved to March 17, 2023.
