= The Bronze (film) =

- Theatrical release poster
- Directed by: Bryan Buckley
- Written by: Melissa Rauch; Winston Rauch
- Produced by: Stephanie Langhoff
- Starring: Melissa Rauch; Gary Cole; Thomas Middleditch; Sebastian Stan; Cecily Strong; Haley Lu Richardson
- Cinematography: Scott Henriksen
- Edited by: Jay Nelson
- Music by: Andrew Feltenstein; John Nau
- Production companies: Stage 6 Films; Duplass Brothers Productions
- Distributed by: Sony Pictures Classics
- Release dates: January 22, 2015 (Sundance); March 18, 2016 (United States)
- Running time: 100 minutes
- Country: United States
- Language: English
- Budget: $3.5 million
- Box office: $615,816

The Bronze is a 2015 American sports comedy-drama film directed by Bryan Buckley and written by Melissa Rauch and Winston Rauch. It was produced by Mark Duplass and Jay Duplass through their Duplass Brothers Productions banner. The film stars Rauch, Gary Cole, Thomas Middleditch, Sebastian Stan, Cecily Strong, Haley Lu Richardson and Dale Raoul. It had its world premiere at the Sundance Film Festival on January 22, 2015, and was theatrically released on March 18, 2016, by Sony Pictures Classics.

== Plot ==
Former gymnastics bronze medalist Hope Ann Greggory has been living off her celebrity status in her hometown of Amherst, but is otherwise unemployed and supports herself by stealing money and valuables from parcels in her father's mail truck. When her former coach Elena Pavleck suddenly dies by suicide, a letter arrives addressed to Hope stating that if she can guide Pavleck's best student, a young gymnastics star named Maggie Townsend, to the Olympics in Toronto, she will receive a $500,000 inheritance.

Fearing that Maggie's success will eclipse hers and take away her meal ticket, Hope instead plots to sabotage Maggie's training by feeding her junk food and a shake laced with marijuana. Maggie performs so poorly that arrogant former Olympic gold medalist Lance Tucker, the team coordinator who resents Hope's celebrity because she won an inferior bronze medal (despite a career-ending injury), attempts to force her mother to fire Hope. When Hope's father finally threatens to cut her off if she forfeits the inheritance, she grudgingly accepts her new role as a coach. Along the way, she starts a romance with assistant coach Ben Lawfort, nicknamed "Twitchy" due to his involuntary facial spasms.

Hope's efforts eventually pay off when Maggie qualifies for the Olympic Games. However, she then learns that Pavleck's gym is set to be foreclosed on because her former coach had gone bankrupt before her death. Upon hearing the news, Hope's father confesses that he wrote the letter, hoping to force his daughter to finally do something meaningful with her life. After a heated argument, Hope gets drunk and ends up having sex with Lance, leading a heartbroken Ben, who witnessed the act, to break off their relationship.

Maggie wins the gold medal and is celebrated as a local hero in Amherst, but soon announces her intention to begin training with Lance in L.A. instead of staying with Hope. When Maggie fails to show up for an autograph signing at a mall, Hope addresses the disappointed crowd and declares that she will always be Amherst's hero. She arranges a membership drive and uniform sales to save Pavleck's gym before taking over as head coach, while reconciling with Ben and retaining him as her co-owner and assistant.

In the epilogue, a caption reveals that Maggie was forced to abandon her gymnastics career after becoming pregnant with Lance's child. Although none of Hope's pupils went on to achieve any level of distinction in gymnastics, she remains a beloved coach and instructor.

== Cast ==
- Melissa Rauch as Hope Ann Greggory, a former member of the 2004 U.S. Olympic women's gymnastics team who won a bronze medal on a ruptured tendon and has since used her victory as a means to get free food and drinks from local businesses. Desperate for money, she accepts an opportunity to train a promising young gymnast
  - Ellery Sprayberry as 2004 Hope Ann
- Haley Lu Richardson as Maggie Townsend
  - Katherine Grable as the stunt double who performed Maggie's gymnastic scenes
- Gary Cole as Stan Greggory, Hope's father and a mail carrier
- Cecily Strong as Janice Townsend, Maggie's blue-collar mother
- Thomas Middleditch as Ben Lawfort, Pavleck's former assistant coach
- Sebastian Stan as Lance Tucker, a prominent former Olympian and gold-medal winner in men's gymnastics, who has since become a trainer for the U.S. Olympic women's gymnastics team
- Dale Raoul as Doris
- Michael Shamus Wiles as Davey
- Christine Abrahamsen as Elena Pavleck, Maggie's and Hope's former coach
- Kathryn Ding as Christa Carpenter, a member of the U.S. Olympic team
- Craig Kilborn as Heath, an announcer at the Olympics
- Chris Van Vliet as a news reporter

== Production ==
On July 9, 2014, it was reported Melissa Rauch, Gary Cole, Thomas Middleditch, Sebastian Stan, Cecily Strong and Haley Lu Richardson had all been cast in the film, as well as that Stephanie Langhoff would produce the film under the Duplass Brothers Productions banner.

=== Filming ===
Principal photography on the film began on July 4, 2014, in Amherst, Ohio. Production on the film concluded on July 26, 2014. In an interview after Sundance, Rauch stated that she and Buckley trimmed scenes and restored some original story ideas for a new theatrical version.

== Release ==
In July 2014, Sony Pictures Worldwide Acquisitions acquired international distribution rights to the film. The film had its world premiere at the Sundance Film Festival on January 22, 2015. Shortly after, Relativity Media acquired distribution rights to the film. The film was originally scheduled for release in July 2015, and then October 2015. In September 2015, it was pulled from the schedule. The same month, Sony Pictures Classics acquired U.S distribution rights instead, and it was announced that Stage 6 Films would distribute the film internationally. The film was to be released in a limited release on March 11, 2016, but was delayed a week to March 18, 2016, in favor of a wide release.

== Reception ==
On Rotten Tomatoes, the film has a rating of 37%, based on 98 reviews, with an average rating of 6.1/10. The site's consensus reads, "Enthusiastically unpleasant and mostly unfunny, The Bronze fails to stick the landing – or much else along the way." On Metacritic, the film has a score of 44 out of 100, based on reviews from 31 critics, indicating "mixed or average reviews".

Peter Debruge of Variety wrote: "Though no one would accuse The Bronze of not being funny, it somehow manages not to be funny often enough." Richard Roeper of the Chicago Sun-Times called it "one of those comedies that could have been a brilliant short film on 'Funny or Die' or 'Saturday Night Live', but wears out its welcome as a feature-length film."
