= Barkhad Abdi =

Somali actor (born 1985)

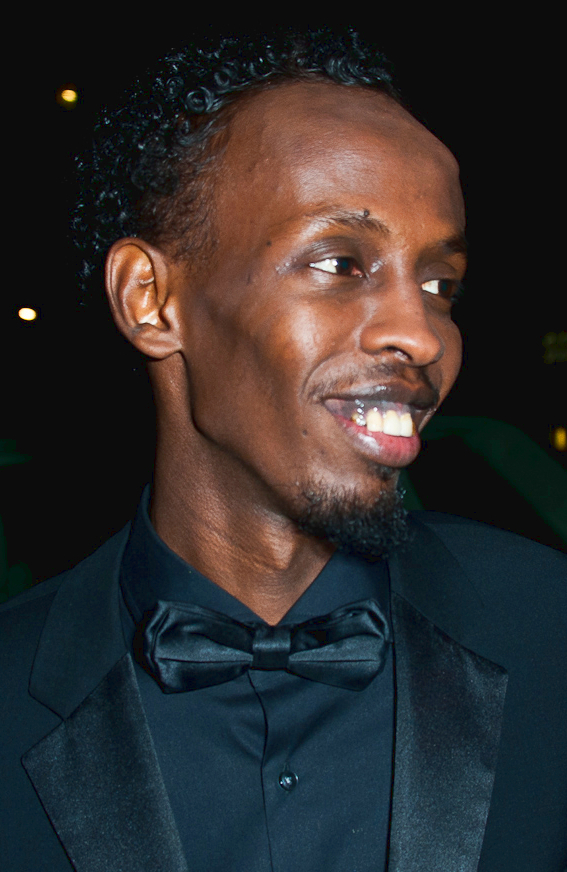
- Abdi in 2014
- Born: April 10, 1985 (age 41); Mogadishu, Somalia
- Education: Minnesota State University, Moorhead
- Occupation: Actor
- Years active: 2013–present
- Awards: Full list

Barkhad Abdi (Somali: Barkhad Cabdi, IPA: [bàrxád̪ ʕábd̪ì]; born April 10, 1985) is a Somali actor. He made his acting debut as the pirate Abduwali Muse in the biographical drama film Captain Phillips (2013), which earned him a British Academy Film Award for Best Actor in a Supporting Role, along with Academy Award, Golden Globe Award, and Actor Award nominations.

Following his breakthrough, Abdi appeared in the films Eye in the Sky (2015), Good Time (2017), The Pirates of Somalia (2017), and Blade Runner 2049 (2017). Outside of film, he was featured as a series regular on the second season of the Hulu horror anthology Castle Rock (2019) and a recurring role in the Showtime satirical comedy series The Curse (2023).

== Early life and education ==
Barkhad Abdi was born to Somali Omar Mahmoud Majerten parents on April 10, 1985, in Mogadishu, Banaadir, Somalia. The name Barkhad in the Somali language literally means cistern, with water representing life. Around the age of six or seven, when the Somali Civil War broke out, he and his family moved to Yemen to join his father, who had taken up teaching. In 1999, Abdi and his family immigrated to the US, settling in Minneapolis, Minnesota, home to a large Somali community.

He graduated from Roosevelt High School in 2003 and attended Minnesota State University Moorhead. Before entering the film industry, Abdi sold mobile phones at his brother's shop at a mall in Minneapolis. He also worked as a limousine driver at a relative's chauffeur company and as a DJ.

== Acting career ==
=== Captain Phillips ===
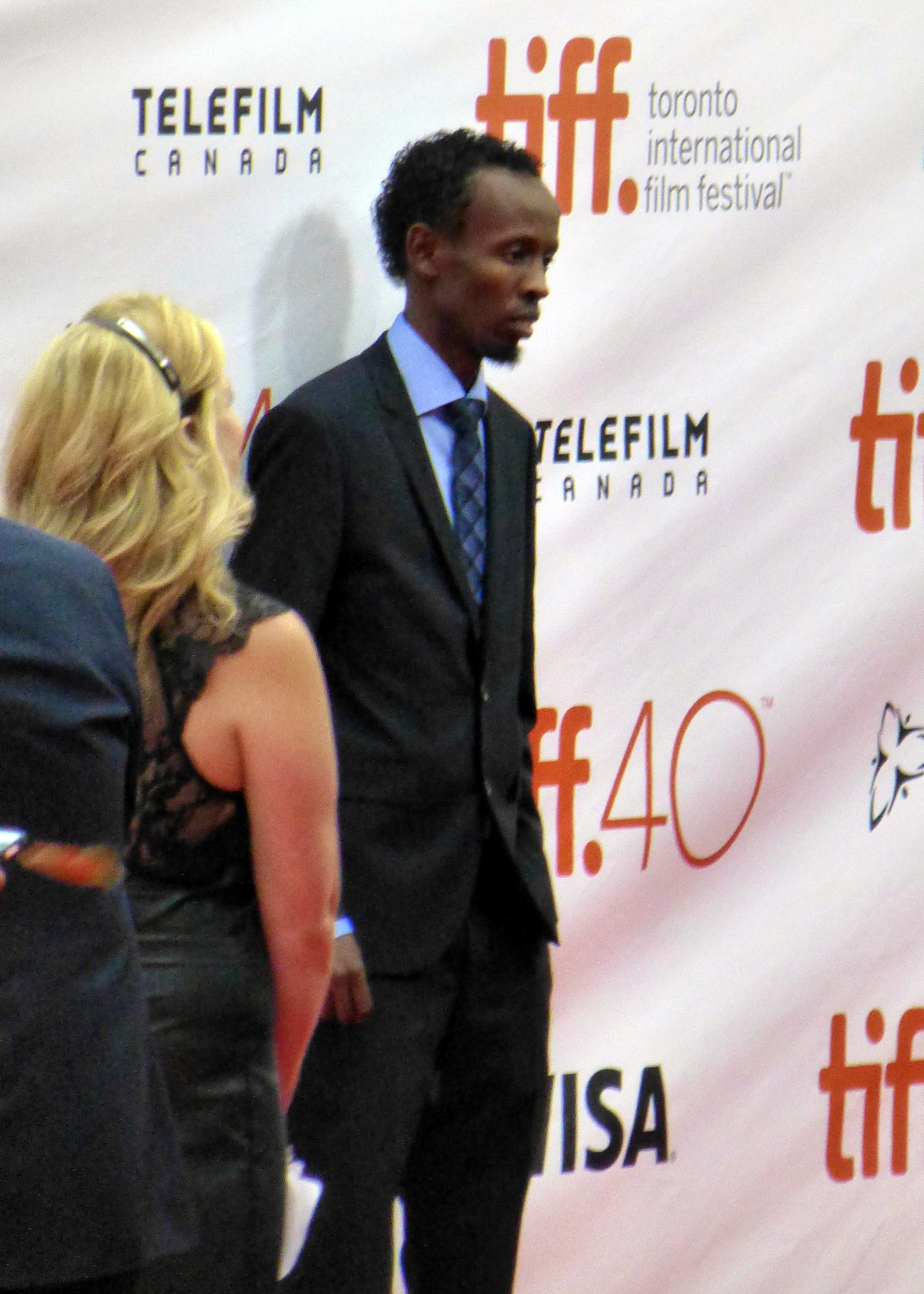
Abdi during the Eye in the Sky premiere at the Toronto Film Festival, 2015

Abdi made his debut in the Paul Greengrass directed film Captain Phillips (2013), playing ship hijacker and pirate leader Abduwali Muse. He was cast opposite Tom Hanks, following a worldwide search for the lead roles. Abdi and three other actors were chosen from more than 700 participants at a 2011 casting call in Minneapolis. According to the casting director, the four were selected because they were "the chosen ones, that anointed group that stuck out". He was paid $65,000 for his appearance in the film and returned to working in his brother's shop afterwards. For his performance Abdi earned the BAFTA Award for Best Supporting Actor. He also received nominations for the Academy Award, Golden Globe Award, and Screen Actors Guild Award for Best Supporting Actor. Abdi's experience in Captain Phillips was his first in the film industry.

=== Later career ===
In 2015, Abdi appeared in an episode of the series Hawaii Five-0, playing former warlord Roko Makoni. Later that year, he began work on the comedy film Trainwreck, though he did not appear in the finished film. He appeared in the 2015 thriller Eye in the Sky as Kenyan undercover agent Jama Farah, and he had a role in Grimsby. In the 2017 film The Pirates of Somalia, Abdi played the Somali government-sponsored local agent and translator for Canadian freelance journalist Jay Bahadur. His character coordinates interviews between local pirate leaders and Bahadur, who records the motivations of Somali piracy in the weeks leading up to the Maersk Alabama hijacking. In October 2017, Abdi featured in Denis Villeneuve's Blade Runner 2049, in a minor role of a scientist. Abdi made his directorial debut with the Somali film Ciyaalka Xaafada. He has directed several music videos. In 2019, Abdi reunited with Captain Philips castmate Faysal Ahmed, in the second season of Castle Rock, in which he starred in 10 episodes.

In 2022, he acted in the films Tyson's Run and Agent Game starring Mel Gibson and appeared in the Apple TV+ series Little America. In 2023 he acted in the A24 / Showtime satirical comedy-drama series The Curse starring Emma Stone, Nathan Fielder, and Benny Safdie.

== Philanthropy ==
In 2013, Abdi was appointed as an Ambassador for Adeso, a non-governmental organisation founded by the Somali-American environmentalist Fatima Jibrell.

== Personal life ==
Abdi resided in Los Angeles, California as of 2014 and in 2016 lived in Cedar-Riverside, Minneapolis, Minnesota. The bump on his forehead is from a car crash he was in prior to auditioning for Captain Phillips.

== Filmography ==
=== Film ===
Year	Title	Role	Notes
2013	Captain Phillips	Abduwali Muse	
2015	Eye in the Sky	Jama Farah	
2015	Wolf Who Cried Boy	Reggie	Short film
2016	Grimsby	Tabansi Nyagura	
2017	Extortion	Miguel Kaba	
2017	Good Time	Dash	
2017	Blade Runner 2049	Doc Badger	
2017	The Pirates of Somalia	Abdi	
2018	The Extraordinary Journey of the Fakir	Wiraj	
2019	A Girl from Mogadishu	Hassan	
2020	Beneath a Sea of Lights	Caweys	
2022	Tyson's Run	Aklilu	
2022	Agent Game	Omar	
2025	Run	Ismael	
TBA	Synthetic †	TBA	Post-production
TBA	Maalstroom †	Bahdoon	Post-production

=== Television ===
Year	Title	Role	Notes
2015	Hawaii Five-0	Roko Makoni	Episode: "E 'Imi pono"
2016	Family Guy	Abduwali Muse (voice)	Episode: "Road to India"
2019	Castle Rock	Abdi Omar	10 episodes
2021–2022	Blade Runner: Black Lotus	Doc Badger (voice)	6 episodes
2022	Little America	Mohamed	Episode: "Camel on a Stick"
2023	The Curse	Abshir	6 episodes
2023	Carol & The End of The World	Bashiir Hassan (voice)	Episode: “The Life & Times of Bashiir Hassan”
