= List of awards and nominations received by Barkhad Abdi =

Barkhad Abdi awards and nominations
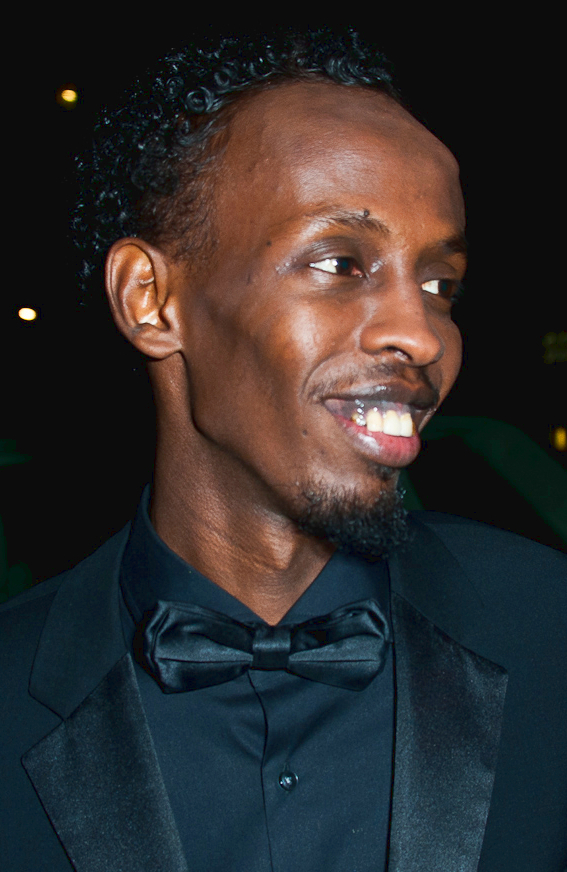
Awards and nominations
Award	Wins	Nominations
Golden Globe	0	1
Academy Awards	0	1
BAFTA Awards	1	1
Screen Actors Guild Awards	0	1

This is a list of awards and nominations received by Somali-American actor and director Barkhad Abdi. He made his debut in the film Captain Phillips (2013). He won a BAFTA and was also nominated for an Academy Award, Golden Globe and Screen Actors Guild Award.

== Major associations ==
=== Academy Awards ===
Year	Nominated work	Category	Result	Ref.
2014	Captain Phillips	Best Supporting Actor	Nominated	

=== BAFTA Awards ===
Year	Nominated work	Category	Result	Ref.
2014	Captain Phillips	Best Actor in a Supporting Role	Won	

=== Golden Globe Awards ===
Year	Nominated work	Category	Result	Ref.
2014	Captain Phillips	Best Supporting Actor - Motion Picture	Nominated	

=== Screen Actors Guild Awards ===
Year	Nominated work	Category	Result	Ref.
2014	Captain Phillips	Outstanding Performance by a Male Actor in a Supporting Role	Nominated	

== Other awards and nominations ==
=== Alliance of Women Film Journalists ===
Year	Nominated work	Category	Result	Ref.
2013	Captain Phillips	Best Supporting Actor	Nominated	

=== Awards Circuit Community Award ===
Year	Nominated work	Category	Result	Ref.
2013	Captain Phillips	Best Supporting Actor	Nominated	

=== Black Reel Awards ===
Year	Nominated work	Category	Result	Ref.
2013	Captain Phillips	Best Supporting Actor	Won	
2013	Captain Phillips	Best Breakthrough Performance	Won	

=== Capri Awards ===
Year	Nominated work	Category	Result	Ref.
2013	Captain Phillips	Breakout Actor	Won	

=== Critics' Choice Movie Awards ===
Year	Nominated work	Category	Result	Ref.
2014	Captain Phillips	Best Supporting Actor	Nominated	

=== Central Ohio Film Critics Association ===
Year	Nominated work	Category	Result	Ref.
2013	Captain Phillips	Best Supporting Actor	Nominated	

=== Chicago Film Critics Association ===
Year	Nominated work	Category	Result	Ref.
2013	Captain Phillips	Best Supporting Actor	Nominated	
2013	Captain Phillips	Most Promising Performer	Nominated	

=== Dallas–Fort Worth Film Critics Association ===
Year	Nominated work	Category	Result	Ref.
2013	Captain Phillips	Best Supporting Actor	Nominated	

=== Denver Film Critics Society ===
Year	Nominated work	Category	Result	Ref.
2013	Captain Phillips	Best Supporting Actor	Nominated	

=== Detroit Film Critics Society ===
Year	Nominated work	Category	Result	Ref.
2013	Captain Phillips	Best Supporting Actor	Nominated	

=== Georgia Film Critics Association ===
Year	Nominated work	Category	Result	Ref.
2013	Captain Phillips	Best Supporting Actor	Nominated	

=== Empire Awards ===
Year	Nominated work	Category	Result	Ref.
2013	Captain Phillips	Best Male Newcomer	Nominated	

=== Houston Film Critics Society ===
Year	Nominated work	Category	Result	Ref.
2013	Captain Phillips	Best Supporting Actor	Nominated	

=== London Film Critics' Circle ===
Year	Nominated work	Category	Result	Ref.
2013	Captain Phillips	Supporting Actor of the Year	Won	

=== MTV Movie Awards ===
Year	Nominated work	Category	Result	Ref.
2014	Captain Phillips	Best Villain	Nominated	

=== National Society of Film Critics ===
Year	Nominated work	Category	Result	Ref.
2013	Captain Phillips	Best Supporting Actor	Nominated	

=== Online Film Critics Society ===
Year	Nominated work	Category	Result	Ref.
2013	Captain Phillips	Best Supporting Actor	Nominated	

=== San Francisco Film Critics Circle ===
Year	Nominated work	Category	Result	Ref.
2013	Captain Phillips	Best Supporting Actor	Nominated	

=== St. Louis Gateway Film Critics Association ===
Year	Nominated work	Category	Result	Ref.
2013	Captain Phillips	Best Supporting Actor	Nominated	
