= Ravin Caldwell =

American football player (born 1963)

No. 50, 54
- Position: Linebacker

Personal information
- Born: August 4, 1963 (age 63); Port Arthur, Texas, U.S.
- Listed height: 6 ft 3 in (1.91 m)
- Listed weight: 229 lb (104 kg)

Career information
- High school: Northside (Fort Smith, Arkansas)
- College: Arkansas
- NFL draft: 1986: 5th round, 113th overall pick

Career history
- Washington Redskins (1986–1992); San Francisco 49ers (1993)

Awards and highlights
- 2× Super Bowl champion (XXII, XXVI)

Career NFL statistics
- Sacks: 8.5
- Fumble recoveries: 2
- Stats at Pro Football Reference

Ravin V. Caldwell Jr. (born August 4, 1963) is an American former professional football player who was a linebacker in the National Football League (NFL) for the Washington Redskins from 1987 to 1992, playing on the teams that won the Super Bowl following the 1987 and 1991 seasons. He played college football for the Arkansas Razorbacks and was selected in the fifth round of the 1986 NFL draft.

Caldwell is married to DeAnna Parson Caldwell (June 25, 2000). Together they have two children, a son Ashton Caldwell, born December 4, 1989, and a daughter, Ravyn Caldwell, born August 24, 2001. He also has a daughter from his relationship with former actress Teal Marchande, Talia Caldwell, who played college basketball at the University of California, Berkeley. Caldwell resides in Ashburn, Virginia.
