= Jay Bahadur =

Canadian journalist and author

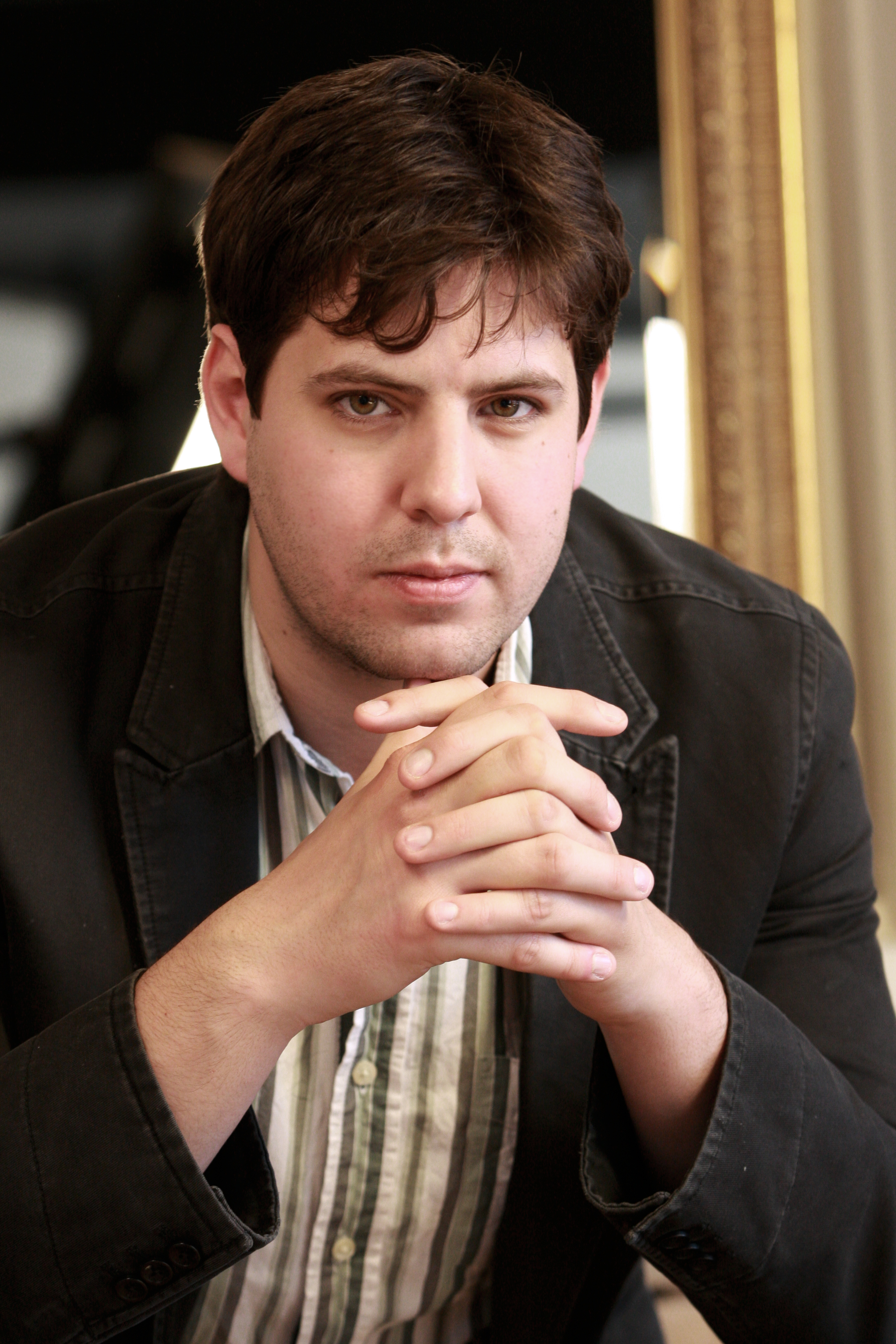
- Born: January 1984 (age 42); Toronto, Ontario, Canada
- Education: University of Toronto
- Occupation: Journalist
- Works: The Pirates of Somalia: Inside Their Hidden World (2011)
- Website: www.jaybahadur.com

Jay Bahadur (born 1984) is a Canadian journalist and author. He became known for his reporting on piracy in Somalia, writing for The New York Times, The Financial Post, The Globe and Mail, and The Times of London. Bahadur has also worked as a freelance correspondent for CBS News and he has advised the U.S. State Department on piracy. His first book, The Pirates of Somalia: Inside Their Hidden World (2011), is his account of living with the pirates for several months in Puntland, a semi-autonomous region in the northeast of Somalia. Bahadur lives in Nairobi, Kenya.

== Early life and education ==
Bahadur was born in 1984 in Toronto, Ontario, Canada. Educated at the University of Toronto Schools, he attended the University of Toronto, graduating in 2007 with a B.A. in Political Science and Economics. In 2008, he was working for a market research firm in Chicago. Interested in working as a journalist, Bahadur was told by real journalists to avoid going to school to study journalism and to obtain experience working as a freelancer in "crazy places" instead.

== Career ==
Bahadur is a Canadian journalist. He has written for The New York Times, The Financial Post, The Globe and Mail, The Times of London, and he has worked for CBS News as a freelance correspondent.

Initially, Bahadur wanted to visit Somalia to write about the election in the northwestern part of the country, but the news coverage of the hijacking and capture of the MV Faina by Somali pirates in September 2008 made him switch gears. Deciding to cover the piracy angle, Bahadur contacted journalists in Somalia and made arrangements with Radio Garowe. He quit his job and purchased a ticket to Somalia. Several months before Bahadur arrived, Canadian freelance journalist Amanda Lindhout was kidnapped in Somalia and held hostage by gunmen far away from the relatively safe areas of Somaliland and Puntland where Bahadur was working on his interviews.

In January 2009, Bahadur traveled for almost two days to reach the semi-autonomous region of Puntland in northeastern Somalia. Once there, he met with the pirates and learned about the history of the industry. During his journey, Bahadur discovered information that challenged basic assumptions about the pirates: there were not as many pirates as he was led to believe, they were not controlled by international crime syndicates and they were not working with jihadists.

He visited Africa several times, spending three months in areas that most journalists never visit. Bahadur returned from his first trip in March 2009, just before the Maersk Alabama hijacking in April. This timing led to heightened interest in his book and he subsequently sold it to a publisher. Bahadur planned on finishing his first book before 2010, but it took much longer than he expected. His book, The Pirates of Somalia: Inside Their Hidden World was released in the U.S. on July 19, 2011.

On August 9, 2011, Bahadur appeared as a guest on The Daily Show.

A film based on his story, The Pirates of Somalia, directed by Bryan Buckley, was released in 2017. Bahadur was portrayed by Evan Peters.

== Publications ==
- The Pirates of Somalia: Inside Their Hidden World. HarperCollins, 2011. ISBN 0-307-37906-X.
