= Jay Nelson =

American film, commercial, and music video editor

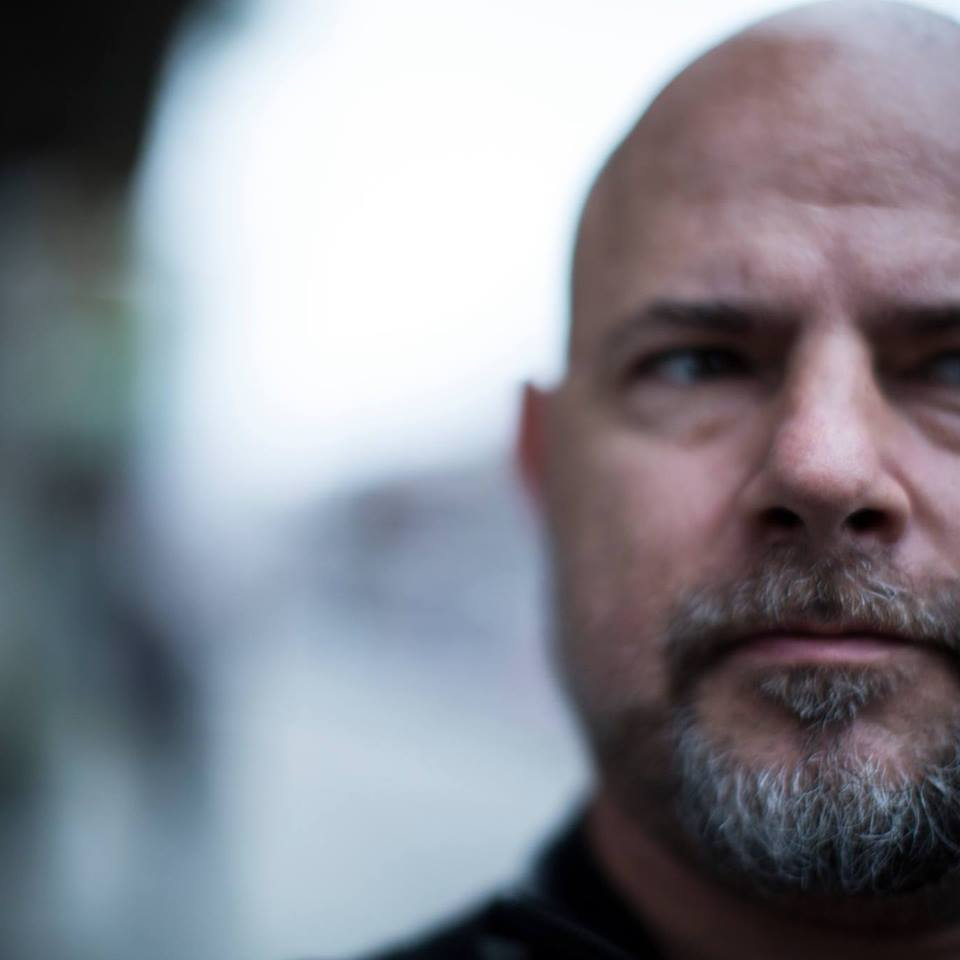
- Born: James Hissom Nelson IV; March 16, 1970 (age 55); New York, New York, U.S.
- Occupation: Film editor
- Years active: 1992–present

Jay Nelson (born March 16, 1970) is an American film, commercial, and music video editor who began his career in the early 1990s. Nelson has edited work for brands including Starburst and Grey Poupon. His feature film editing work includes Wild in the Streets (2012), The Bronze (2015) and Pirates of Somalia (2017).

== Life and career ==
Nelson graduated from college-preparatory school Columbus Academy in Ohio in 1988 and earned a BA from Hamilton College in 1992. He began his film career in 1992 at Los Angeles post-production house, Graying & Balding.

From 1994 to 1995, Nelson worked as a visual effects and editorial assistant at Two Headed Monster in Los Angeles and began his commercial editing career with a Starburst ad featuring Ali Larter and Eric Nies. Nelson’s first music video was for country music artist Brooks & Dunn’s “You’re Gonna Miss Me When I’m Gone” in 1994. In 1999 Nelson joined editorial company Swietlik, which would eventually become Cut+Run in 2003.

Nelson edited the short film, Quantum Project (2000), the first film created expressly for the internet. The web short had a budget of 10 million dollars, starred Steven Dorff and John Cleese, and was directed by Oscar-winning production designer Eugenio Zanetti.

In 2002, Nelson was hired as a post-production consultant and editor on the Comedy Central seriesGerhard Reinke's Wanderlust. He edited 3 episodes of the show and contributed to the rest of the series. Nelson edited the 2005 feature film, Broken, starring Heather Graham and Jeremy Sisto for Focus Features. That same year, he directed the music video for “Time Bomb” by the band, Goldspot.

In 2011, Nelson joined company owners Michelle Eskin and Steve Gandolfi in the re-founding of editorial house, Cut+Run, which was originally founded in London by Steve Gandolfi and Andrew Christie. In 2012, Nelson established an additional office in Austin, Texas. At Cut+Run, Nelson has edited spots Visit California and Heinz, which have aired during the Super Bowl.

Nelson executive produced and edited the 2012 film, Wild in the Streets, a documentary directed by Peter Baxter, about the birth of modern football and the current-day town in England that plays the original Pagan form of the game. Nelson’s self-produced documentary, The Third Crossing (2012), chronicling Hawaii’s all women paddling team as they rechart an ancient course to a remote village on Maui, premiered at the 2012 Ocean Film Festival in Hawaii.

== Business activities ==
In 2005, Nelson and his wife Christie Cash, founded Puakea Ranch on the big island of Hawaii. The ranch is a sustainable alternative to modern hotel travel and features four homes, restored to their original historical state. The eco-friendly retreat was featured in Sunset Magazine.

== Awards and nominations ==
Nelson won the 2012 AICP prize for best editing for Grey Poupon's Emmy-nominated commercial, “The Chase,“ which is included in the permanent archive of the MoMA in NYC for advertising excellence and as an example of the state of the arts in editing.

== Filmography ==
- Control/Option/Escape (2018)
- Pirates of Somalia (2017)
- The Bronze (2015)
- Wild in the Streets (2012)
- The Third Crossing (2012)
- Holy Wars (2010)
- Broken (2006)
- Quantum Project (2000)
