= Ode to Joy (film) =

- Directed by: Jason Winer
- Screenplay by: Max Werner
- Produced by: Mike Falbo; Jason Winer; Michael Lasker; Jimmy Miller; Ira Glass; Alissa Shipp; Pamela Thur
- Starring: Martin Freeman; Morena Baccarin; Jake Lacy; Melissa Rauch; Chris Distefano
- Cinematography: David Robert Jones
- Edited by: Peter Teschner
- Music by: Jeremy Turner
- Production companies: Mosaic Media; Small Dog Picture Company
- Distributed by: IFC Films
- Release dates: April 4, 2019 (RiverRun International Film Festival); August 9, 2019 (United States)
- Running time: 97 minutes
- Country: United States
- Language: English
- Box office: $17,303

Ode to Joy is a 2019 American romantic comedy film starring Martin Freeman and Morena Baccarin. The film premiered at the 2019 RiverRun International Film Festival in Winston-Salem, North Carolina and was released theatrically on August 9, 2019.

== Summary ==
Charlie (Martin Freeman) is a Brooklyn-based librarian in his forties suffering from cataplexy, causing him to faint whenever he experiences strong emotions, especially joy. Upon meeting the charming and free-spirited Francesca (Morena Baccarin), Charlie falls in love but sets her up with his brother Cooper (Jake Lacy) instead because of his condition.

== Cast ==
- Martin Freeman as Charlie, Cooper’s brother
- Morena Baccarin as Francesca, Sylvia’s niece
- Jake Lacy as Cooper, Charlie's brother
- Jane Curtin as Sylvia, Francesca’s aunt
- Melissa Rauch as Bethany
- Shannon Woodward as Liza
- Hayes MacArthur as Jordan
- Ellis Rubin as Victor
- Ravi Cabot-Conyers as Deangelo

== Production ==
The film is based on a true story by Chris Higgins originally aired on This American Life.

== Reception ==
On the review aggregator website Rotten Tomatoes, 50% of 32 critics' reviews are positive, with an average rating of 5.9/10. Metacritic, which uses a weighted average, assigned the film a score of 38 out of 100, based on 7 critics, indicating "generally unfavorable" reviews.
