= Melissa Rauch =

American actress (born 1980)

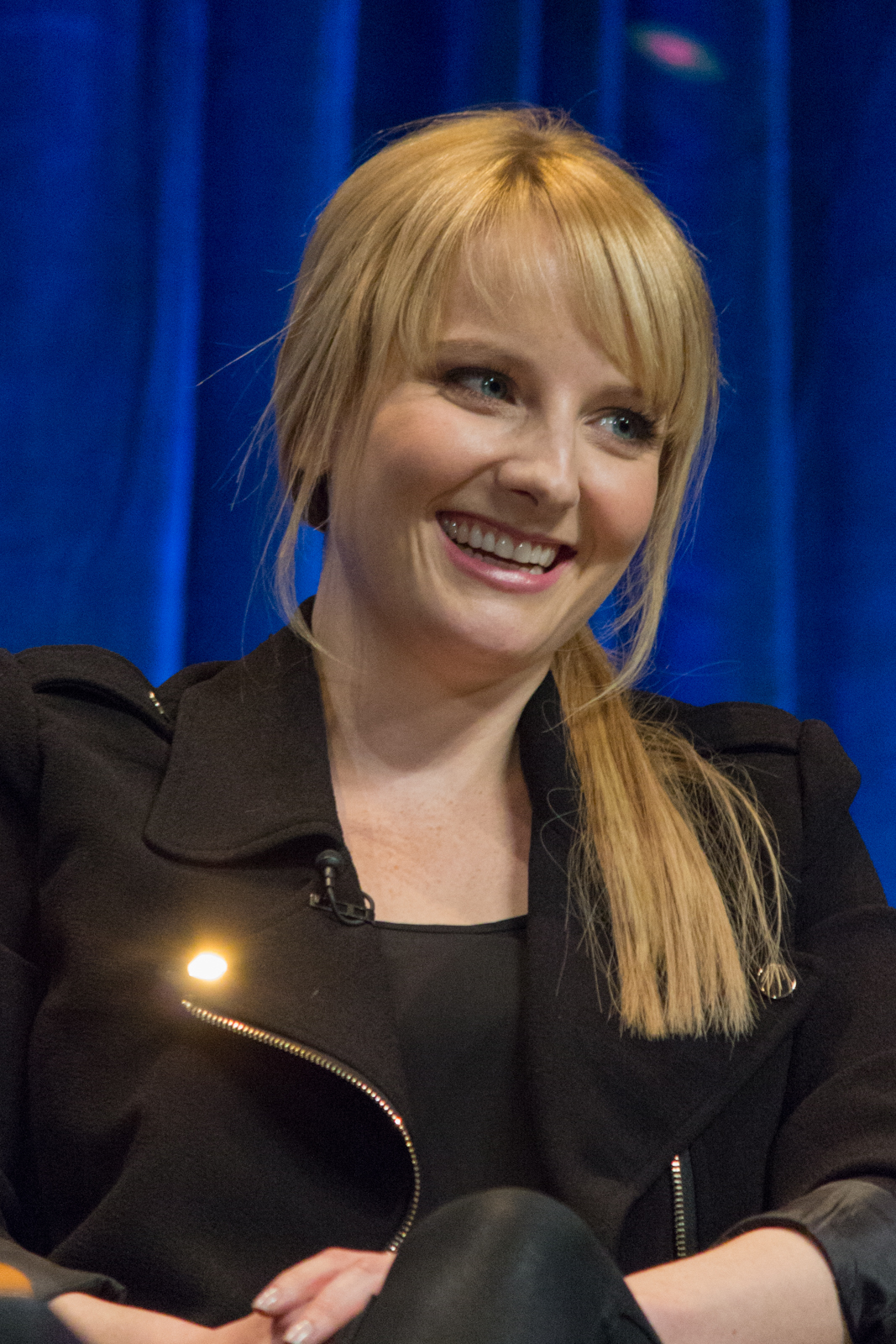
- Rauch in 2013
- Born: Melissa Ivy Rauch; June 23, 1980 (age 46); Marlboro Township, New Jersey, U.S.
- Education: Marymount Manhattan College
- Occupation: Actress
- Years active: 2006–present
- Spouse: Winston Rauch (m. 2007)
- Children: 2

Melissa Ivy Rauch (/raʊʃ/; born June 23, 1980) is an American actress. She is well known for playing Bernadette Rostenkowski-Wolowitz on the CBS sitcom The Big Bang Theory from 2009 to 2019, for which she was nominated for the Critics' Choice Television Award for Best Supporting Actress in a Comedy Series in 2013. She starred in and executive produced three seasons of the revival of Night Court.

Rauch's other acting credits include playing Tina on the American remake of Kath & Kim and Summer on the HBO fantasy horror drama True Blood. Rauch also starred in, co-wrote, and co-produced the 2015 sports comedy-drama film The Bronze and provided the voice of DC character Harley Quinn in the 2017 animated film Batman and Harley Quinn. Rauch also had supporting roles in I Love You, Man (2009), Ice Age: Collision Course and Flock of Dudes (both 2016), and Ode to Joy (2019). In 2019, Rauch played Meryl Streep's daughter in the feature film The Laundromat directed by Steven Soderbergh.

== Early life ==
Rauch was born to David and Susan Rauch in Marlboro Township, New Jersey. She is Jewish. She developed an interest in acting at a young age. After seeing her first Broadway shows with her family, she would try to recreate them in her basement for hours at a time. Rauch earned a Bachelor of Fine Arts in acting and graduated from Marymount Manhattan College (present-day Northeastern University – New York City) in New York City in 2002.

== Career ==
Some of Rauch's early work was as a regular contributor to VH1's Best Week Ever television show.

In 2009, Rauch began playing the recurring role of Bernadette Rostenkowski, a co-worker of Penny's at The Cheesecake Factory who began to date Howard Wolowitz, in the third season of CBS's The Big Bang Theory. The following season, her character became Howard's fiancée, and Rauch was promoted to a series regular. The characters married in the season five finale. In December 2011, Rauch and fellow cast members of The Big Bang Theory received the first of six nominations for the Screen Actors Guild Award for Outstanding Performance by an Ensemble in a Comedy Series.

Other acting credits include True Blood (in which she had a recurring role in 2010 as Summer, a girl who likes Hoyt), The Office, the American remake of the Australian TV series Kath & Kim, Wright v Wrong and the film I Love You, Man.

Rauch is also part of the comedic stage show The Realest Real Housewives cast with Casey Wilson, June Diane Raphael, Jessica St. Clair and Danielle Schneider. The show began running at the Upright Citizens Brigade Theatre in 2011.

Rauch co-wrote and co-produced the film The Bronze, in which she starred as Hope Ann Greggory, a bronze medal-winning gymnast clinging to her glory days of 12 years earlier. It opened the 2015 Sundance Film Festival. Variety said: "Rauch, who co-wrote the screenplay with her husband Winston, has never carried a film before. But she delivers the best breakthrough comedic performance by an actress since Melissa McCarthy in Bridesmaids". Sony Pictures Classics acquired the film in September 2015.

In 2017, Rauch voiced Harley Quinn in the animated film Batman and Harley Quinn and she voiced Light Thief in "Light Riders" from Blaze and the Monster Machines.

She starred in the Night Court revival series playing Judge Abby Stone, the daughter of Judge Harold T. Stone and Gina Stone from the original Night Court series. Season 1 premiered on NBC on January 17, 2023, and was co-produced by Rauch and her husband Winston Rauch, in association with Warner Bros. Television Studios and Universal Television. The show was cancelled after three seasons.

== Stand-up comedy ==
Melissa did her first standup set at age seven in a local New Jersey talent show and then started pursuing stand up professionally in NYC at the age of 18. She toured clubs and colleges nationally and was named "Best College Comedian" by Jamie Foxx and Carson Daly on MTV prior to landing her role on The Big Bang Theory.

Melissa's standup tour entitled, "Breaking Bang" will commence in January 2027.

== Personal life ==
Rauch is married to writer Winston Rauch (né Beigel), who collaborated with her on The Miss Education of Jenna Bush and other projects. They have been married since 2007 and have two children: a daughter born in 2017 and a son born in 2020. She announced her 2017 pregnancy by writing an essay in Glamour, where she reflected on a miscarriage she had previously suffered.

The voices she uses for portraying the character Bernadette on The Big Bang Theory were inspired by experiences growing up in a "house of screamers". She usually portrays Bernadette using a "sweet, high-pitched purr", and switches to an "eerie, haranguing imitation" of Mrs. Wolowitz in interactions with Mrs. Wolowitz. Both are "very different" from Rauch's real voice.

== Filmography ==
=== Film ===
Year	Title	Role	Notes
2006	Delirious	Megan	
2009	I Love You, Man	Jogger	
2009	The Condom Killer	Audra	Shot and also producer
2009	Adventureland	Woman in diner	Uncredited
2013	In Lieu of Flowers	Carrie	
2014	Are You Here	Marie	
2015	The Bronze	Hope Ann Greggory	Also writer and executive producer
2016	Ice Age: Collision Course	Francine	Voice, cameo
2016	Flock of Dudes	Jamie	
2017	Batman and Harley Quinn	Harley Quinn / Dr. Harleen Quinzel	Voice, direct-to-video
2019	Ode to Joy	Bethany	
2019	The Laundromat	Melanie Martin	
2020	Cats & Dogs 3: Paws Unite!	Gwen the Cat	Voice, direct-to-video

=== Television ===
Year	Title	Role	Notes
2007	12 Miles of Bad Road	Bethany	3 episodes
2008–2009	Kath & Kim	Tina	Season 1 (recurring; 6 episodes)
2009–2019	The Big Bang Theory	Bernadette Rostenkowski-Wolowitz	Season 3 (recurring; 5 episodes); Season 4–12 (main role)
2010	The Office	Cathy Duke	Episode: "The Delivery"
2010	True Blood	Summer	Season 3 (recurring; 6 episodes)
2010	Wright vs. Wrong	Daisy Cake	Unaired pilot
2014	Jake and the Never Land Pirates	First-Mate Mollie	Voice, episode: "Smee-erella"
2014	Teenage Fairytale Dropouts	Miss Macabre	Episode: "Something Wicked This Way Substitutes"
2014	The Hotwives of Orlando	Calliope	Episode: "Say You, Séance"
2015	Sofia the First	Fairy Tizzy	Voice, 2 episodes
2015	Scooby-Doo! and the Beach Beastie	Kiki	Voice, television film
2017	Star vs. the Forces of Evil	Baby	Voice, episode: "Baby"
2017	Marvel's Ant-Man	Wasp	Voice, 2 episodes
2017	Blaze and the Monster Machines	The Light Thief	Voice, episode: "Light Riders"
2019	Black Monday	Shira	2 episodes
2019	Robot Chicken	Betty Spaghetty, Rainbow Brightstar	Voice, episode: "Molly Lucero in: Your Friend's Boob"
2020	Animaniacs	Marie Antoinette	Voice, episode: "France France Revolution"
2022	Firebuds	Beth Bayani	Voice, 3 episodes
2022	Celebrity Jeopardy!	Herself	Contestant
2023–2025	Night Court	Abby Stone	Main role, also executive producer
2026	Stuart Fails to Save the Universe	Bernadette Rostenkowski	2 epísodes

== Awards and nominations ==
Award	Year	Category	Nominated work	Result
Critics' Choice Television Awards	2013	Best Supporting Actress in a Comedy Series	The Big Bang Theory	Nominated
Online Film & Television Association	2016	Best Supporting Actress in a Comedy Series	The Big Bang Theory	Nominated
People's Choice Awards	2014	Favorite TV Gal Pals (shared with Kaley Cuoco and Mayim Bialik)	The Big Bang Theory	Nominated
Screen Actors Guild Awards	2012	Outstanding Performance by an Ensemble in a Comedy Series	The Big Bang Theory	Nominated
Screen Actors Guild Awards	2013	Outstanding Performance by an Ensemble in a Comedy Series	The Big Bang Theory	Nominated
Screen Actors Guild Awards	2014	Outstanding Performance by an Ensemble in a Comedy Series	The Big Bang Theory	Nominated
Screen Actors Guild Awards	2015	Outstanding Performance by an Ensemble in a Comedy Series	The Big Bang Theory	Nominated
Screen Actors Guild Awards	2016	Outstanding Performance by an Ensemble in a Comedy Series	The Big Bang Theory	Nominated
Screen Actors Guild Awards	2017	Outstanding Performance by an Ensemble in a Comedy Series	The Big Bang Theory	Nominated
