= Kenan & Kel =

American sitcom

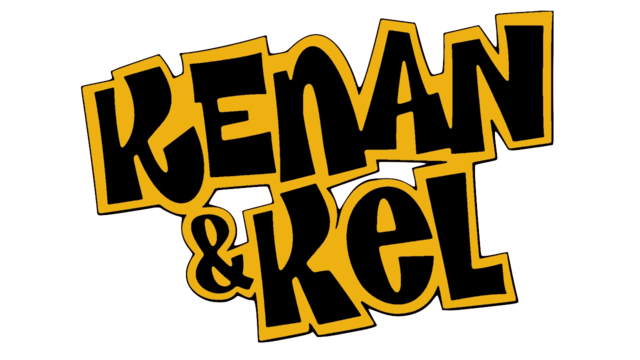
- Genre: Sitcom
- Created by: Kim Bass
- Showrunners: Dan Schneider (seasons 1–2); Kevin Kopelow (seasons 3–4); Heath Seifert (seasons 3–4)
- Starring: Kenan Thompson; Kel Mitchell; Ken Foree; Teal Marchande; Vanessa Baden; Dan Frischman
- Theme music composer: Victor Concepcion
- Opening theme: "Aw, Here It Goes!" by Coolio
- Composer: Richard Tuttobene
- Country of origin: United States
- Original language: English
- No. of seasons: 4
- No. of episodes: 65 (list of episodes)

Production
- Executive producers: Brian Robbins; Mike Tollin
- Producers: Dan Schneider; Kevin Kopelow; Heath Seifert; Virgil L. Fabian; Keiren Fisher
- Production locations: Nickelodeon Studios, Universal Studios Florida (seasons 1–2); Nickelodeon on Sunset (seasons 3–4)
- Camera setup: Videotape, multi-camera
- Running time: 24–25 minutes
- Production companies: Tollin/Robbins Productions; Nickelodeon Productions

Original release
- Network: Nickelodeon
- Release: August 17, 1996 – January 14, 2001

Related
- All That

Kenan & Kel is an American sitcom created by Kim Bass that originally aired on Nickelodeon from August 17, 1996, to January 14, 2001. Set in Chicago, the series follows mischievous Kenan Rockmore (Kenan Thompson) and his happy-go-lucky best friend Kel Kimble (Kel Mitchell), who get involved with zany hijinks on a number of misadventures due to the former's far-fetched plans and the latter's ineptitude. The show was one of three spin-offs from All That, in which Thompson and Mitchell had co-starred for several years.

The show features Kenan's family, which consists of his father Roger (Ken Foree), mother Sheryl (Teal Marchande), and younger sister Kyra (Vanessa Baden). The show also features the unlucky Kenan's boss Chris Potter (Dan Frischman). Kenan & Kel features appearances from a number of guest stars, including game show host/radio disc jockey Bob Eubanks, basketball player Ron Harper, and singer Britney Spears.

The first two seasons were taped at Nickelodeon Studios at Universal Studios Florida. The last two seasons were taped at the now closed theater Nickelodeon on Sunset in Los Angeles, California.

== Premise ==
Set in Chicago, Illinois, Kenan & Kel follows Kenan Rockmore and Kel Kimble, a pair of high school students who go on various misadventures, which usually occur as a result of Kenan devising a scheme to get rich quick or avoid trouble with his elders. These schemes are often foiled as a result of Kel's aloof nature and clumsiness.

The show employs a number of running gags. Episodes open and close with Kenan and Kel breaking the fourth wall by interacting with a studio audience, standing in front of a red curtain that is placed in front of the main set while they are still in character. Usually, they do stuff that relates to the episode itself, for example, in the opening of "The Tainting of the Screw", Kel is seen wearing fishing gear and showing off a tuna he caught, and the episode is about Kenan choking on a screw that was in his tuna sandwich. A running gag of the openings is Kel never knowing what the night's episode would be about and Kenan refusing to tell him, while the closings frequently feature Kenan coming up with a new scheme, often asking Kel to get various assorted items and meet him somewhere. Frazzled both times, Kel exclaims his catchphrase, "Aww, here it goes!" (which both opens and closes the show).

== Production ==
Kenan & Kel was created by Kim Bass, and stars Kenan Thompson and Kel Mitchell as the title characters. The actors previously starred in the Nickelodeon series All That. Mitchell and Thompson would frequently joke around on the set of All That, which caught the attention of producers, including Bass, who wished to package Thompson and Mitchell in a series. During a hiatus of All That, the producers kept Thompson and Mitchell so they could tape the pilot for Kenan & Kel. Mitchell later expressed fondness working with Thompson on the series. Kenan & Kel was Mitchell's second professional acting performance, having only worked on All That and in amateur theater productions in Chicago beforehand. Thompson's previous experience included a role in D2: The Mighty Ducks (1994). Kenan is the series' straight man, and Kel is the comic foil. The series theme song, "Aw, Here It Goes", is performed by rapper Coolio.

The first season contains 14 episodes, taped between April and August 9, 1996. The season was taped in front of a studio audience at Nickelodeon Studios in Universal Studios Florida. The characters of Kenan and Kel also make a crossover appearance on the Nickelodeon series Cousin Skeeter.

== Broadcast ==
In the midst of the series' initial run, reruns of the series briefly aired on Nickelodeon's sister channel, Nick GAS in 1999. After the series finished its run in 2001, reruns continued to air on Nickelodeon from January 21, 2001, to February 15, 2004.

The series then reran daily on The N as part of the "TEENick on The N" block from October 13, 2007, to August 2, 2009. Reruns started airing on the successor channel TeenNick from July 25, 2011, to February 3, 2013, and again from March 4, 2013, to May 31, 2014, as part of its The '90s Are All That programming block (later called "The Splat", "NickSplat", and "NickRewind"). The series airs reruns frequently on Nickelodeon's Pluto TV channel and streams on Paramount+ and Netflix.

In the United Kingdom, the series aired on Nickelodeon from 1997 to 2012, and on both BBC One and BBC Two for several years in the late 1990s and early 2000s, as part of the CBBC programming block. The series ran on Trace Vault until the channel discontinued in 2023.

== Episodes ==
Season	Episodes	Originally released	
Season	Episodes	First released	Last released
1	14	August 17, 1996	January 11, 1997
2	13	September 6, 1997	December 27, 1997
3	22	October 10, 1998	May 8, 1999
4	16	August 7, 1999	January 14, 2001

== Home media ==
Kenan & Kel has been released on DVD in the compilations Best of Seasons 1 & 2 and Best of Season 3 & 4. Both are manufacture-on-demand releases through Amazon.com. Individual seasons are not available. The Best of Seasons 1 & 2 DVD is missing 3 episodes ("In the Line of Kenan", "Baggin' Saggin Kel", and ""Safe and Sorry"; all from season 1) to complete the set, but season 2 is complete. The Best of Seasons 3 & 4 DVD is also missing 3 episodes ("The Chicago Witch Trials", "Freezer Burned", and "Who Love Who-ooh?"; all from Season 3), but season 4 is complete. These DVD releases are absent of any bonus features.

DVD	Episodes	Release date	Disc 1	Disc 2	Disc 3	Disc 4
The Best of Seasons 1 & 2	23	May 21, 2014	"Pilot", "The Tainting of the Screw", "Doing Things the Heming-Way", "Mental Kel-Epathy", "Duh Bomb", "Mo' Sweater Blues", "Diamonds Are For Roger", "The Cold War"	"Dial 0 for Oops", "Merry Christmas, Kenan", "Twizzles Fizzles", "Pair-Rental Guidance", "Turkey Day", "The Crush", "Ditch Day Afternoon", "Clownin' Around"	"The Lottery", "Who Loves Orange Soda?", "Foul Bull", "A Star is Peeved", "Get the Kel Out of Here", "Bye-Bye, Kenan: Part 1", "Bye-Bye, Kenan: Part 2", "I Haven't Got Time for the Paint"	—N/a
The Best of Seasons 3 & 4	35	November 6, 2014	"Fenced In", "To Catch a Thief", "The Raffle", "Skunkator vs. Mothman", "The Contest", "Surprise, Surprise", "I.Q. Can Do Better", "You Dirty Rat", "Attack of the Bug Men"	"We Are the Chimpions", "Happy B-Day Marc", "Poem Sweet Poem", "Present Tense", "Picture Imperfect", "Clothes Encounters", "Housesitter", "I'm Gonna Get You Kenan", "The Limo"	"He Got Job", "Corporate Kenan", "The Honeymoon's Over", "Girl-Watchers", "Car Trouble", "Futurama", "Three Girls, a Guy, and a Cineplex", "Natural Born Kenan"	"The Graduates", "Aw, Here It Goes To Hollywood : Part 1 & 2", "Oh, Brother", "The April Fools", "Tales from the Clip", "Two Heads Are Better Than None"

On July 28, 2011, the first season of Kenan & Kel was released on the iTunes Store. On November 29, 2011, the second season was released. On February 13, 2012, the third season was released. On August 13, 2012, the fourth season was released. Seasons 1 and 2 were released on the UK iTunes store in September 2013. As of 2021, most of the series is available to watch on Paramount+. Seasons 1 and 2 can be found on Netflix, except for "Baggin' Saggin' Kel", "Safe and Sorry", "Bye Bye, Kenan: Part 1" and "Bye Bye, Kenan: Part 2".

== Reception ==
The series won the "Favorite TV Show" award at the 1998 Kids' Choice Awards.

== Legacy ==
In a December 3, 2022, Saturday Night Live comedy sketch, Kenan Thompson, a longtime SNL cast member, appears in a spoof of Kenan & Kel called Kenan & Kelly with guest host Keke Palmer. In the skit, Palmer explains her desire to reboot Kenan & Kel after meeting Thompson and expressing her fondness of him during his Nickelodeon years. The skit is intercut between pseudo-interviews and recreations of the Rigby's grocery store set from the original series featuring Thompson, Palmer, and Mitchell. The addition of elements such as Palmer's disapproval of the word "idiot" to describe her, her pregnancy reveal, the robbery of Rigby's, and the subsequent shooting death of Kel are played for dramatic effect, which Thompson concludes as a reason why the "reboot" failed.

The series inspired a duo of funk DJs from Campinas, São Paulo, who share the same names as the protagonists and became known for mixing funk, hip hop and electronic sounds.
