= Bryan Buckley =

American filmmaker (born 1963)

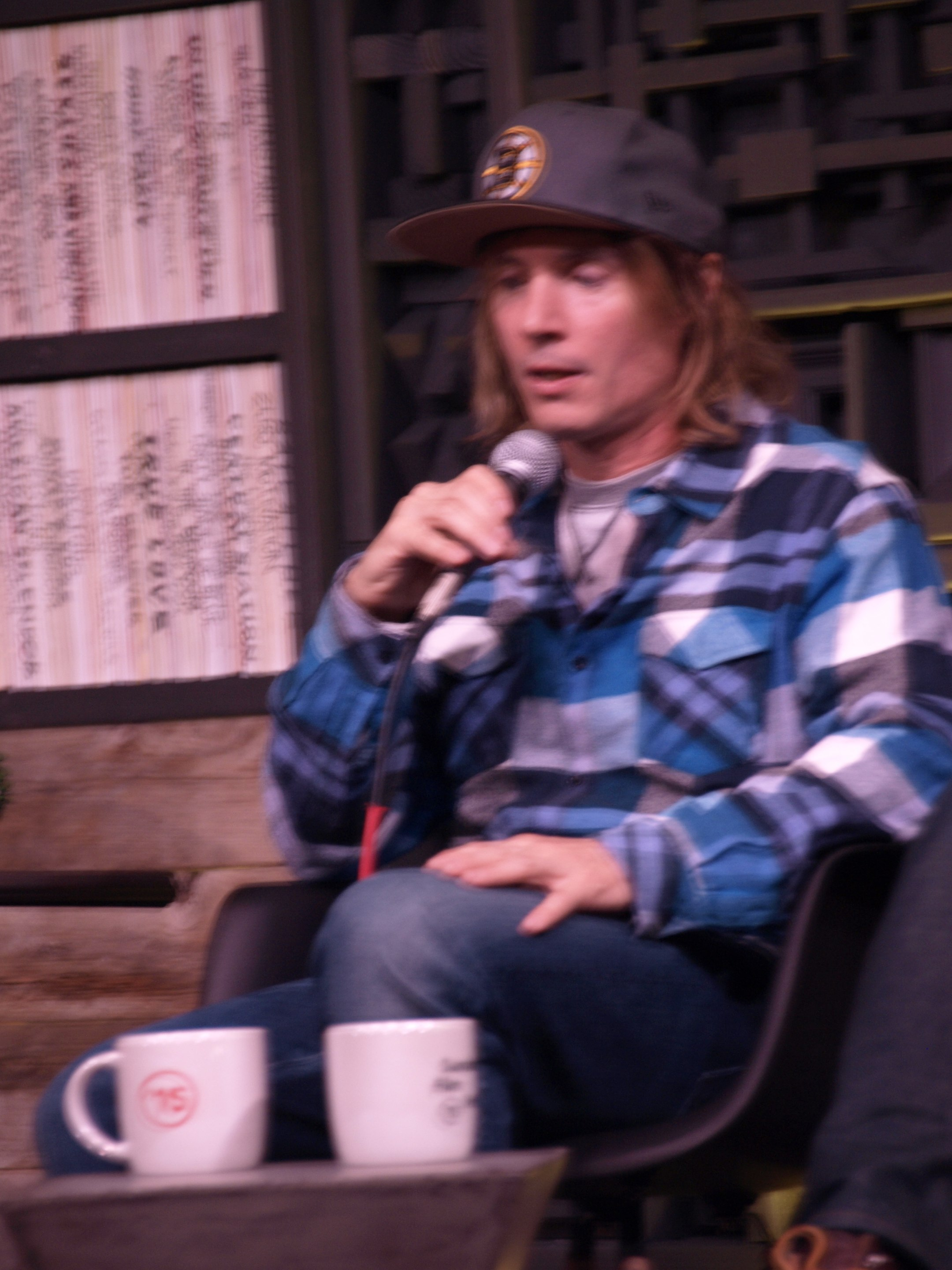
- Bryan Buckley in 2015
- Born: Cambridge, Massachusetts, United States
- Education: Syracuse University
- Occupations: Film director, screenwriter
- Years active: Since 1988
- Spouse: Kiana Madani (m. 2017) Sharon Buckley (1988–2004)

Bryan Buckley is an American filmmaker, screenwriter, producer, and two-time Academy Award nominated director.

Buckley's directorial debut came with a series of commercials he created for NHL on ESPN, before creating the "This is SportsCenter" campaign for ESPN in 1999. The work became a part of the ESPN brand, and launched Buckley into the commercial world. Buckley would go on to direct over 70 Super Bowl commercials. His first feature film The Bronze (2015), opened the 2015 Sundance Film Festival, while his second, The Pirates of Somalia (2017), premiered at Tribeca in 2017.

Two of his short films, ASAD (2013) and SARIA (2019), have been nominated for Best Live Action Short Film at the Academy Awards. His two nominations in the same decade mark the first time a director has managed to return to the category in over 30 years.

== Early life and education ==
Bryan Buckley's father, a one-time Army reservist, worked as an art director in a small regional ad agency and later became chair of Boston's New England School of Art. His mother worked as a top promotional executive at Jordan Marsh department store. His parents were both activists involved in the anti-war and civil rights movements of the 1960s. In 1976, his parents separated, and he returned to Massachusetts with his mother.

In his senior year of high school, Buckley was selected for the Short Term Institute at Phillips Andover preparatory school on a full art scholarship. He was then admitted to Syracuse University's design program; he finished his first class in advertising design there in 1985, but never enrolled in a film class during his time in college.

== Career ==
After graduating from Syracuse, Buckley began as an entry-level art director at Doyle Dane Bernbach.

In 1988, he co-founded his own agency, Buckley/DeCerchio, with his Chiat/Day co-worker Tom DeCerchio. Their first client was the 4 million dollar Godfather's Pizza account. Buckley and DeCerchio then hired friends and filmmakers who would work cheaply. Within a few months, Buckley and DeCerchio were on the cover of Adweek. In their first year open, their work for Godfather's Pizza was awarded with a Gold Pencil at the One Show, an advertising awards show.

The agency would go on to sign clients such as Yugo cars and Snapple, for whom they created the famous "Made From the Best Stuff on Earth" slogan. In December 1993, Buckley and DeCerchio made the cover of the New York Times business section. The next day they announced that they had closed the agency.

=== SportsCenter ===
In 1994, Buckley and his collaborator Frank Todaro were offered the chance to direct a few unscripted, very low-budget promos for ESPN's hockey telecasts. Buckley had never been behind the camera before, and the job was not paid.

Over its 25-year run, the campaign has featured appearances from several sports stars, including Kobe Bryant, Wayne Gretzky, David Ortiz, LeBron James, Mike Tyson, and Michael Phelps. SportsCenter was named the best commercial campaign of the 1990s by The One Club.

=== Hungry Man Productions ===
In 1997, Buckley co-founded Hungry Man Productions along with "This is SportsCenter" creator Hank Perlman and long-time producer Steve Orent. The company quickly added several directors to its roster, such as Jim Jenkins, David Shane, Bennett Miller, and Stacy Wall.

Buckley's first major work came in 1999 with his first Super Bowl spot, a commercial for Monster.com called "When I Grow Up". In the 30-second TV spot, kids answered the question "What do you want to be when you grow up?" with responses such as "I want to be a 'yes' man" and "I want to be forced into early retirement".

Initially, the ad was considered a disappointment, as viewers gave the commercial low marks in the USA Today Ad Meter, a consumer poll of the best and worst Super Bowl ads that has become an industry standard for measuring public reaction to the multi-million dollar project.

However, the Monster.com ad continued to get airplay over the next few days while conversation around other commercials died down, and the job site ended up crashing due to increased user activity. Monster.com reported an increase of 1 million site visits per month for the rest of 1999.

By 2004, the company had won the Cannes Festival's Palme d'Or as the top commercial production company in the world and has finished in the top ten for more than ten consecutive years, the first production company to do so. Hungry Man has offices in New York, Los Angeles, London, Rio and São Paulo, and has a slate of directors including Taika Waititi, Wayne McClammy, and Nanette Burstein.

=== Commercial work ===
His work has often garnered publicity, and has at times been described as "anticommercials". His commercial for E*Trade in 2000 featured a mock-amateur commercial. The ad features a chimpanzee, wearing an oversized E*Trade t-shirt, flanked by a pair of men in a disheveled two-car garage, all facing the camera. They clap, out of sync, to a tinny recording of "La Cucaracha". At the end, the chimpanzee folds his hands over his crotch, and tag line appears: "Well, we just wasted $2 million. What are you doing with your money?" In 2018, Adweek would declare it "the most subversive Super Bowl ad ever."

In 2011, Buckley directed a series of commercials for New Era apparel. The campaign, titled "Rivalry", had actors John Krasinski and Alec Baldwin engaged in trash talk as fans of their respective teams, the Boston Red Sox and New York Yankees. The spots were inducted into the permanent collection of the Museum of Modern Art.

His 2020 Super Bowl spot for Hyundai, titled "Smaht Pahk", was named on several best of the game lists by Time, Adweek, and Vogue. It was also ranked number two on the USA Today Ad Meter. The spot, which stars John Krasinski, Chris Evans, Rachel Dratch, and David Ortiz features the Massachusetts natives over-enunciating the distinctive vowels of the classic Boston accent as they talked about Hyundai's new Sonata. In 2022, Buckley directed the Toyota Super Bowl spot with Saatchi & Saatchi.

Buckley directed the NFL’s 2023 Super Bowl spot, Run With It, starring Diana Flores — the Mexico Women’s National Flag Football quarterback. It features sports icons and athletes alike: Erin Andrews, Billie Jean King, Vanita Krouch, Bella Rasmussen, Cam Heyward, Jalen Ramsey, Davante Adams, Aidan Hutchinson and Sauce Gardener. Run With It won a gold Clio, finished second place on USA TODAY’s Ad Meter and its excellence was further recognized with a Sports Emmy win. The popularity of the spot helped propel women’s flag football to becoming an Olympic sport in the 2028 games.

In 2024, Buckley directed BMW's "Talkin' Like Walken" Super Bowl ad, featuring Christopher Walken and Usher. It was rated as the most-liked commercial of that year's Super Bowl.

=== Narrative work ===
As of 2020 he has directed two feature films and four short films. Of his four shorts, Krug (2004) played at Sundance, Wake Up Caller (2004) played at the Tribeca Film Festival, while ASAD (2013) and SARIA (2019) have been nominated for Best Live Action Short Film at the Academy Awards. His two nominations in the same decade mark the first time a director has managed to return to the category in over 30 years.

In September 2011, Buckley shot the short film ASAD in South Africa with an all-Somali refugee cast. The story, which Buckley also wrote, follows a young Somali boy's tale of how he deals with the decision to fall into pirate life, or become a fisherman. The film screened at over 50 film festivals worldwide and took top honors at the Tribeca Film Festival, ultimately receiving a nomination for Best Live Action Short Film at the 85th Academy Awards.

Buckley's first feature film, The Bronze, was selected to open the 2015 Sundance Film Festival and received praise in Park City as the "breakout comedy" of the festival. The film features a notorious sex scene, called one of the 15 greatest of all time by InStyle and deemed the "wildest sex scene" by Vulture.

In 2017, Buckley wrote and directed the American drama film The Pirates of Somalia. The film stars Evan Peters, Oscar winner Al Pacino, Melanie Griffith, and Barkhad Abdi. The film, set in 2008, is about rookie Canadian journalist Jay Bahadur's plan to embed himself among the pirates of Somalia to provide a close-up look at who they are, how they live, and the forces that drive them. The film had its world premiere at the Tribeca Film Festival on April 27, 2017, and was released by Echo Bridge on December 8, 2017. The Hollywood Reporter called the film "A lively tale bent on deepening our understanding of its sensationalism-ready subject."

== Accolades ==
In 1999, Buckley won the Best Directing award from the Directors Guild of America, a cumulative award for several commercials he directed that year, including his Super Bowl spot "When I Grow Up" for Monster.com, and work for E*trade.

He has been nominated for three Emmy Awards, and has won over 60 Cannes Lions, most recently the top honors at Cannes in 2019, a Grand Prix for his work on the March for Our Lives "Generation Lockdown" campaign to raise awareness about gun violence prevention. Buckley also took the Titanium Lion and the top honors, a Grand Clio for his Microsoft "Changing the Game" work showcasing Xbox's new adaptive controller, the first ever system designed to be inclusive of handicapped gamers. The same year, he won 15 gold pencils at the One Show for his work with both the Microsoft and March for Our Lives campaigns.

Buckley's second Academy Award nomination for Short Film within the same decade is the first time a director has managed to return to the category in over 30 years.

== Activism ==
After the release of his 2019 short SARIA, the film was cited by members of Congress in a 2020 letter to the Secretary of State. Congressmen Adriano Espaillat and Vicente Gonzalez stated the film "amplifies global awareness" of the issue, and demanded justice for the victims and an investigation into the whereabouts of the remaining survivors. Buckley has stayed involved with the pursuit of justice within Guatemala, attending a meeting on Capitol Hill between Stef Arreaga, a prominent activist and Congressmen Espaillat and Gonzalez Jr.

In 2020, Buckley created a team named the Trump Statue Initiative dedicated to mocking Donald Trump and actions taken during his presidency. Buckley noted "Trump is obsessed with statues".

On June 4, 2021, Buckley partnered with ad agency Leo Burnett and two parents of a child killed in the 2018 shooting at Marjory Stoneman Douglas High School to mislead gun rights activists John Lott and David Keene into believing they were to give a dress rehearsal for a 2021 graduation address for a fictitious school called the "James Madison Academy". The space for the audience was made up of 3,044 empty folding chairs which were meant to represent victims of school shootings. According to BuzzFeed News, Lott claims he was instructed "... that I had to have half the talk ... be on background checks in particular", while Lott says this was his first commencement address, he went on to assert, "So I said ... I can do that but it seemed a little bit weird for a commencement address." In reality, the event was a staged attempt to call attention to school shootings, and not for a genuine commencement address. The parents orchestrating the fake event posted video segments of the "dress rehearsal" to the internet. Will Pregman, an activist with Nevada-based progressive group Battle Born Progress said of the event, "They agreed to speak to a school without doing, ironically, a background check to find out if this was a valid school or a real event." The work was covered across numerous media platforms, including MSNBC's The Rachel Maddow Show.

On October 26, 2024, at 9:00am ET, Buckley launched TrumpCellCam.com, which featured a satirical 24/7 "livestream" video of former president Donald Trump's would-be life in a prison cell. Ad Age named the project as one of their "13 Creative Campaigns To Know About Today." Buckley himself plays Trump in the footage, which offered American voters a one-of-a-kind chance to see Trump where many believe he belongs—in a prison cell—before they voted in the 2024 presidential election. The website also encouraged viewers to register to vote and educated them on the election, detailing the candidates' respective stances on critical issues and all of Trump's ongoing criminal trials.

== Super Bowl ads ==
Buckley's work has consistently aired during the Super Bowl, leading to the New York Times deeming him the "King of the Super Bowl". Super Bowl ads which he has worked on include:

- BMW – "Talken Like Walken" (2024)
- NFL – "Run With It" (2023)
- Avocados from Mexico – "Make It Better" (2023)
- Toyota – "Keeping Up With The Joneses" (2022)
- Verizon – "No Thanks, Cable Guy" (2022)
- BMW – "How Zeus Got His Joy Back" (2022)
- Cheetos – "It Wasn't Me" (2021)
- Verizon – "Don't Blame The Lag" (2021)
- Bud Light – "Bud Light Legends" (2021)
- SodaStream – "Water on Mars" (2020)
- Hyundai – "Smaht Pahk" (2020)
- Colgate – "Close Talker" (2019)
- Microsoft – "We All Win" (2019)
- Febreze – "Bleep Don't Stink" (2018)
- Bud Light – "Ghost Dog" (2017)
- He's a Ten – "4 Years of Hair" (2017)
- Honda – "New Truck to Love" (2016)
- SodaStream – "Sorry, Coke and Pepsi" with Scarlett Johansson (2014)
- TurboTax – "Love Hurts" (2014)
- GoDaddy – "Body Builder, Puppet Master" (2014)
- Best Buy – "Asking Amy" (2013)
- Tide – "Miracle Stain" (2013)
- Coca-Cola – "Mirage" (2013)
- CareerBuilder – "Business Trip" (2012)
- Best Buy – "Ozzy vs Bieber" (2011)
- Audi – "Release the Hounds" (2011)
- Mini Cooper – "Cram It in the Boot" (2011)
- Teleflora – "Help Me Faith" with Faith Hill (2011)
- CareerBuilder – "Parking Lot" (2011)
- McDonald's – "Proud Papa" (2011)
- Audi – "Green Police" (2010)
- HomeAway – Hotel Hell Vacation (2010)
- Cash4Gold – "One Up" (2009)
- H&R Block – "Murray" (2009)
- Bud Light – "Conan O'Brien" (2009)
- Sprint Nextel – "Roadies" (2009)
- Planters – "Perfume" (2008)
- Bud Light – "Endorsement" with Jackie Moon (2008)
- CareerBuilder – "Darts, Promotion Pit, Performance Evaluation" (2007)
- Chevy – "Car Wash" (2007)
- Bud Light – "Save Yourself" (2006)
- Sprint Nextel – "Crime Deterrent, Couch" (2006)
- Burger King – "America's Favorite" with The Whopperettes (2006)
- CareerBuilder – "I Understand, Celebration" (2006)
- FedEx – "Top Ten" (2005)
- GoDaddy – "GoDaddy" (2005)
- MasterCard – "Cashier" (2005)
- CareerBuilder – "Titanic, Whoopee Cushion, Monkey's Apology" (2005)
- Chevy – "Soap" (2004)
- Pepsi – "The Osbournes" (2003)
- FedEx – "Desert Island" (2003)
- H&R Block – "Willie" (2003)
- Visa – "Bacon" (2002)
- E*Trade – "Entertainer" (2002)
- Charles Schwab – "HR King" (2002)
- E*Trade – "Security Guard, Romantic Dinner, Monkey II" (2001)
- FedEx – "Blow Up" (2001)
- E*Trade – "Monkey, Basketball, Out the Wazoo, Window" (2000)
- Monster.com – "When I Grow Up" (1999)
