= The Pirates of Somalia =

2011 book by Jay Bahadur

- First edition (US)
- Author: Jay Bahadur
- Language: English
- Genre: Nonfiction
- Publisher: Pantheon Books (US); Profile Books (UK)
- Publication date: 2011
- Media type: Print
- Pages: 320
- ISBN: 978-1554686827

The Pirates of Somalia (titled Deadly Waters in the UK and Australia) is a nonfiction book by Canadian journalist Jay Bahadur about his experiences and observations living among pirates in the autonomous region of Puntland during an upsurge in Somali piracy. An advance excerpt appeared in a May 2011 edition of The Guardian.

== See also ==
- The Pirate Tapes, a documentary film
