= Dan Frischman =

American actor (born 1959)

- Born: Daniel Frischman; April 23, 1959 (age 67); Whippany, New Jersey, U.S.
- Other name: The Great Houdanny
- Occupations: Actor, comedian, writer, director, magician
- Years active: 1981–present
- Children: 1
- Website: www.danfrischman.com

Daniel Frischman (born April 23, 1959) is an American actor, comedian, writer, director, playwright and magician. He is best known for his roles as Chris Potter on the Nickelodeon sitcom Kenan & Kel and Arvid Engen on the ABC sitcom Head of the Class. He is noted for playing socially inept "geeks" and "nerds". Frischman is a member of The Magic Castle, which belongs to the Academy of Magic Arts in Hollywood.

== Early life ==
Frischman was born and raised in the Whippany section of Hanover Township, New Jersey. His father Joseph was a CPA and his mother Florence was a second grade teacher. His family is Jewish. He attended Whippany Park High School, graduating in 1977, before attending Penn State University. After university he moved to New York City to become a stand up comedian.

== Career ==
Frischman developed an interest in magic as a child after seeing an ad in Boys' Life magazine. Before Frischman's television breakthrough, he often worked as a magician in the Los Angeles area under the pseudonym "The Great Houdanny" (in reference to Harry Houdini) performing at, amongst other things, children's birthday parties and charity events. He brought his brand of comedy to his magic shows and was a popular hire in the mid-1980s.

Frischman performed at several comedy clubs in New York City, including the Comic Strip, Catch a Rising Star and Dangerfield's, before moving to Los Angeles.

=== Early television career ===
He was first noticed in a March 17, 1982, episode of the NBC television series The Facts of Life. In the episode, titled "Kids Can Be Cruel" Frischman played high school student "Carl 'Rocky' Price" who was picked on by his peers because of his acne and nerd-like personality. The students in the episode referred to Frischman's character as "Pizzaface", because of his pronounced acne blemishes and scars. In the episode the character Natalie Green, played by actress Mindy Cohn, gets angry at her roommate Blair Warner (Lisa Whelchel) and sets her up with Frischman's character "Rocky" as a cruel joke.

In 1983, Frischman appeared in the comedy film Get Crazy as Joey, a nerdy (and virginal) stagehand. Also in 1983, he starred in the "Things your Parents Used to Say" sequence in Good-bye, Cruel World.

Frischman appeared in both these projects alongside his sometime roommate, comedian Andrew J. Lederer, who played smaller roles. Frischman and Lederer also appeared together as two of the "Schlongini Singers" in the Andrew "Dice" Clay horror comedy Wacko and (with Adam Small and Felice Seiler) in the comedy group The Ding Dongs.

=== Head of the Class ===
Frischman's first co-starring role was that of Manhattan-based high school student Arvid Engen on ABC-TV's late 1980s/early 1990s series Head of the Class. Though playing a teenager, Frischman was 27 as the series started and 32 when it concluded.

On December 20, 1986, Frischman and the cast of Head of the Class were the celebrity guests on the urban music series Soul Train. On July 15, 1987, Frischman appeared as that evening's guest on NBC-TV's talk show Late Night with David Letterman.

=== Kenan & Kel ===
Frischman's second co-starring role was the character of Chris Potter in the 1990s Nickelodeon TV series Kenan & Kel, a spin-off of Nickelodeon's All That starring Kenan Thompson and Kel Mitchell. Once again Frischman played a socially awkward nerd, this time as Chris Potter, Kenan's boss at Rigby's, a small grocery store.

Chris often informs customers and other guests that he has a radio in his car in an attempt to make conversation. One of Chris' anxieties was a recurring dream that he was being chased by a giant bunny.

=== Cameos ===
Frischman made a short appearance on the 1990s series Seinfeld. In episode 93, titled "The Mom & Pop Store" (which originally aired on November 17, 1994, on U.S. television network NBC), Frischman plays a man who phones Jerry Seinfeld to tell the comedian that he has found his stolen sneaker collection at a yard sale in Parsippany, New Jersey (located just north of the town Frischman grew up in); Frischman asked to change the name of the place in the script from Parsippany to his hometown of Whippany, but Seinfeld declined, saying "No, 'Whippany' doesn't sound like the name of a real town."

On October 24, 2005, Frischman was a celebrity panelist on I Love the '80s 3-D, a television program on VH1.

=== Playwriting ===
Frischman wrote and starred in the play About Faith, produced by Beverly Hills Playhouse. He played a Jewish stockbroker who falls in love with a Catholic girl. It was renamed Sex, Faith and Jason Wexler.

== Personal life ==
Frischman announced on his Facebook page in 2019 that he had recently discovered he had a biological daughter named Emily and a grandson named Roy. Frischman briefly dated Emily's mother when he was 22 years old. He lost contact with her, unaware that she was pregnant and that she later put her baby up for adoption. Frischman learned of his daughter's existence in January 2019 through the DNA testing web site 23andMe. He soon met her along with her husband Neil and their son Roy, describing them as "a beautiful new family that I’m building a relationship with."

== Filmography ==
=== Television ===
Year	Title	Role	Note
1981; 1989	It's a Living	Frankie	3 episodes
1982	The Facts of Life	Carl 'Rocky' Price	1 episode
1982	Making the Grade		1 episode
1982	Newhart	Mortician	1 episode
1982	Archie Bunker's Place	Mime	1 episode
1983	Voyagers!	Waiter	1 episode
1984	Double Trouble	Walter	1 episode
1985	Alice	Lester	1 episode
1985	Brothers	Froggy	1 episode
1985	Webster	Skippy	1 episode
1986	The Paper Chase		1 episode
1986	St. Elsewhere	Technician	1 episode
1986–1991	Head of the Class	Arvid Engen	114 episodes
1989	It'z Fritz		1 episode
1994	Melrose Place	County Records Clerk	1 episode
1994	Seinfeld	Guy on Phone	1 episode
1996–2000	Kenan & Kel	Chris Potter	62 episodes
2007	Passions	Animal Control Officer	1 episode
2013–2014	Sam & Cat		Director (3 episodes)

=== Film ===
Year	Title	Role	Notes
1981	Straight at Ya	Waldo	Short film
1982	Wacko	Schlongini Singer	
1983	Good-bye Cruel World		segment: "Things Your Parents Used to Say"
1983	Lone Wolf McQuade	Emilio Falcon	
1983	Get Crazy	Joey	
1986	Night of the Creeps	Alien Zombie	
1995	Mickey: Reelin' Through the Years		Telefilm
2003	Masked and Anonymous	Eddie Quicksand	
2003	Lessons for an Assassin	Dr. Legoy	
2007	The Trip	Doctor Friedman	
2007	Hard Four	Bernie Yak	
2010	Tramps and Ramblers	Kenny	Telefilm
