= Teal Marchande =

American actress

- Born: January 11, 1965 (age 61); Lansing, Michigan, U.S.
- Occupation: Actress
- Years active: 1994–2000
- Partner: Ravin Caldwell
- Children: 1

Belinda Teal Marchande Caldwell (born January 11, 1965) is a former American actress, best known for her role as Sheryl Rockmore on the Nickelodeon sitcom Kenan & Kel. She has also guest-starred on Martin and the UPN sitcom Good News. She has not acted professionally since Kenan & Kel ended in 2000.

Marchande once had a relationship with Washington Redskins linebacker Ravin Caldwell. Together they have a daughter Talia Caldwell, who played college basketball at the University of California, Berkeley. They reside in Los Angeles.

== Filmography ==
Filmography
Year	Title	Role	Notes
1994	Martin	Woman	
1998	Good News	Jackie	
1996–2000	Kenan & Kel	Sheryl Rockmore	
1998	Kraa! The Sea Monster	Alma James	
1999	Planet Patrol	Alma James	
