= Kim Bass =

American screenwriter

Kim Bass (born February 16, 1956) is an American film and television writer, director, and producer.

== Early life ==
Bass was born in Utica, New York to father C.W. Bass. He has one brother, Kyle, and four sisters.

He graduated in 1974 from Notre Dame Junior Senior High School.

== Career ==
Bass' television work includes creating Sister, Sister and writing on In Living Color. Bass also created the Nickelodeon sitcom Kenan & Kel. His film credits include the movie Junkyard Dog starring Vivica A. Fox and Kill Speed.

Bass is one of the founders of the independent production company Bass Entertainment Pictures.

== Filmography ==
- Succubus: Hell-Bent, 2007 horror film directed by Kim Bass. With Gary Busey, David Keith, Lorenzo Lamas
- A Snowy Day in Oakland, a 2023 American comedy film written and directed by Kim Bass. It stars Nicole Ari Parker, Loretta Devine, Michael Jai White and Keith David.
