= Terrence Malick filmography =

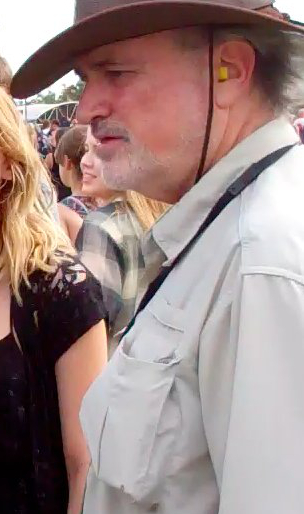
Terrence Malick

Terrence Malick is an American filmmaker. Throughout his career, which has spanned over four decades, he has directed nine feature films and one documentary. He has also written scripts for other directors, and since the 1990s has acted as producer and executive producer on numerous projects.

== Filmography ==
=== Feature films ===
Year	Title	Director	Writer	Producer	Notes	Ref.
1973	Badlands	Yes	Yes	Yes		
1978	Days of Heaven	Yes	Yes	No		
1998	The Thin Red Line	Yes	Yes	No	Based on the novel by James Jones	
2004	The Beautiful Country	No	Story	Yes	Credited as Lingard Jervey; story co-written with Sabina Murray	
2004	Undertow	No	Story	Yes	Credited as Lingard Jervey	
2005	The New World	Yes	Yes	No		
2011	The Tree of Life	Yes	Yes	No		
2012	To the Wonder	Yes	Yes	No		
2015	Knight of Cups	Yes	Yes	No		
2017	Song to Song	Yes	Yes	No		
2019	A Hidden Life	Yes	Yes	No		
TBA	The Way of the Wind	Yes	Yes	No	Upcoming	

==== Writer only ====
Year	Title	Director	Notes	Ref.
1971	Dirty Harry	Don Siegel	Uncredited; early unused draft later retooled for Magnum Force	
1971	Drive, He Said	Jack Nicholson	Uncredited script revisions	
1972	Deadhead Miles	Vernon Zimmerman		
1972	Lady Ice	Tom Gries	Uncredited early draft	
1972	Pocket Money	Stuart Rosenberg	Based on Jim Kane by J.P.S. Brown	
1974	The Gravy Train	Jack Starrett	Credited as David Whitney; co-written with Bill Kerby	
2002	Bear's Kiss	Sergei Bodrov	Uncredited; original story	

Producer only

Year	Title	Director	Notes	Ref.
1998	Endurance	Leslie Woodhead		
2006	Amazing Grace	Michael Apted		
2014	The Better Angels	A. J. Edwards		

Executive producer only

Year	Title	Director	Notes	Ref.
2000	Happy Times	Zhang Yimou		
2013	Red Wing	Will Wallace		
2016	The Vessel	Julio Quintana		
2017	The Spearhead Effect	Brandon Moore, Caleb Alexander Smith		
2020	The Book of Vision	Carlo S. Hintermann		

==== Acting roles ====
Year	Title	Role	Notes	Ref.
1969	Lanton Mills	Tilman		
1972	Pocket Money	Workman	Uncredited	
1973	Badlands	Caller at Rich Man's House	Uncredited	
1978	Days of Heaven	Worker	Uncredited	

=== Short films ===
Year	Title	Director	Writer	Notes	Ref.
1969	Lanton Mills	Yes	Yes	Student short film Also music composer	
2018	Together	Yes	No	VR experience	

=== Documentary works ===
Year	Title	Director	Writer	Notes	Ref.
2016	Voyage of Time	Yes	Yes	Documentary film	

Executive producer only

Year	Title	Director	Notes	Ref.
2000	The Endurance: Shackleton's Legendary Antarctic Expedition	George Butler		
2007	The Unforeseen	Laura Dunn		
2015	Almost Holy	Steve Hoover		
2015	The Seventh Fire	Jack Pettibone Riccobono		
2016	Look & See: A Portrait of Wendell Berry	Laura Dunn, Jef Sewell		
2018	Awaken	Tom Lowe		
2019	Everybody's Everything	Sebastian Jones, Ramez Silyan		

== See also ==
- List of awards and nominations received by Terrence Malick
- Thy Kingdom Come
