= List of awards and nominations received by Terrence Malick =

Terrence Malick awards and nominations
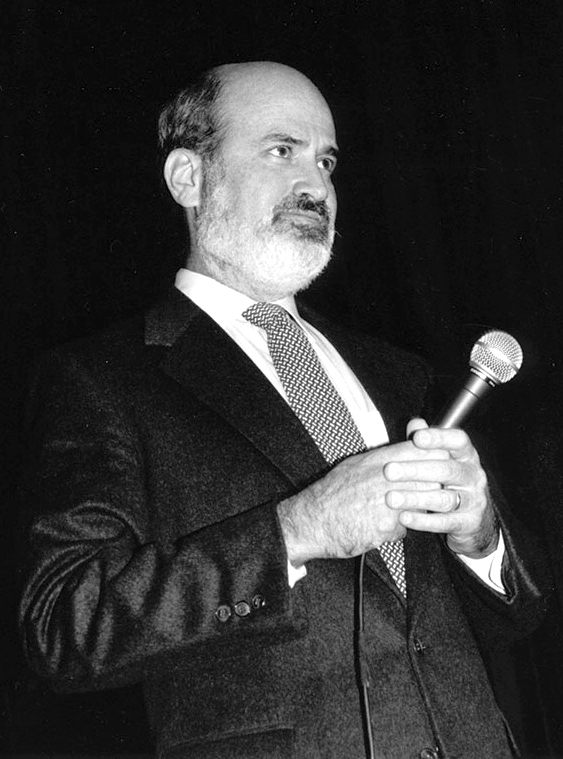
- Malick at the 1993 Viennale
Awards and nominations
Award	Wins	Nominations
Academy Awards	0	3
Berlin Film Festival	1	3
Cannes Film Festival	4	6
Golden Globe Awards	0	1
Venice Film Festival	3	5

Totals (Note: Certain award groups do not simply award one winner. They acknowledge several different recipients, have runners-up, and have third place. Since this is a specific recognition and is different from losing an award, runner-up mentions are considered wins in this award tally. For simplification and to avoid errors, each award in this list has been presumed to have had a prior nomination.)
- Wins: 8
- Nominations: 20

Terrence Malick is an American film director, screenwriter and producer. Throughout his career, which has spanned over four decades, he has received prizes from the Cannes Film Festival, Berlin International Film Festival, and Venice International Film Festival as well as nominations for three Academy Awards, a Golden Globe Award, a Cesar Award, and a Directors Guild of America Award.

Malick was nominated for the Academy Award for Best Director for the epic war film The Thin Red Line (1998) and the experimental coming-of-age film The Tree of Life (2011). He was also nominated for the Academy Award for Best Adapted Screenplay for the former. He received a nomination for the Golden Globe Award for Best Director for the romantic period drama Days of Heaven (1978).

At the Berlin International Film Festival he won the Golden Bear for The Thin Red Line (1998). At the Cannes Film Festival he won the Palme d'Or for The Tree of Life (2011) and the Cannes Film Festival Award for Best Director for Days of Heaven in 1979. He was nominated for the César Award for Best Foreign Film for Days of Heaven and the Directors Guild of America Award for Outstanding Directing – Feature Film for The Thin Red Line. He won the New York Film Critics Circle Award for Best Director twice for Days of Heaven and The Thin Red Line

== Major associations ==
=== Academy Awards ===
Year	Category	Nominated work	Result	Ref.
1998	Best Adapted Screenplay	The Thin Red Line	Nominated	
1998	Best Director	The Thin Red Line	Nominated	
2011	Best Director	The Tree of Life	Nominated	

=== Golden Globe Awards ===
Year	Category	Nominated work	Result	Ref.
1979	Best Director	Days of Heaven	Nominated	

== Film festival awards ==
=== Berlin Film Festival ===
Year	Category	Nominated work	Result	Ref.
1999	Reader Jury of the "Berliner Morgenpost"	The Thin Red Line	Nominated	
1999	Golden Bear	The Thin Red Line	Won	
2016	Golden Bear	Knight of Cups	Nominated	

=== Cannes Film Festival ===
Year	Category	Nominated work	Result	Ref.
1979	Best Director	Days of Heaven	Won	
1979	Palme d'Or	Days of Heaven	Nominated	
2011	Palme d'Or	The Tree of Life	Won	
2019	Palme d'Or	A Hidden Life	Nominated	
2019	François Chalais Prize	A Hidden Life	Won	
2019	Prize of the Ecumenical Jury	A Hidden Life	Won	

=== Venice Film Festival ===
Year	Category	Nominated work	Result	Ref.
2012	SIGNIS Award	To the Wonder	Won	
2012	Golden Lion	To the Wonder	Nominated	
2016	Golden Lion	Voyage of Time	Nominated	
2016	Green Drop Award	Voyage of Time	Won	
2016	Future Film Festival Digital Award - Special Mention	Voyage of Time	Won	

== Miscellaneous awards ==
Year	Category	Nominated work	Result	Ref.
César Awards
1999	Best Foreign Film	The Thin Red Line	Nominated	
Chicago Film Critics Association
1998	Best Director	The Thin Red Line	Won	
2011	Best Director	The Tree of Life	Won	
2011	Best Original Screenplay	The Tree of Life	Nominated	
Directors Guild of America Awards
1999	Outstanding Directing – Feature Film	The Thin Red Line	Nominated	
National Society of Film Critics
1979	Best Director	Days of Heaven	Won	
1999	Best Director	The Thin Red Line	2nd Place	
2012	Best Director	The Tree of Life	Won	
New York Film Critics Circle
1978	Best Director	Days of Heaven	Won	
1998	Best Director	The Thin Red Line	Won	
2005	Best Director	The New World	4th Place	
Writers Guild of America Awards
1979	Best Original Screenplay	Days of Heaven	Nominated	

== Awards received by Malick movies ==
Year	Film	Academy Awards		BAFTA Awards		Golden Globe Awards	
Year	Film	Nominations	Wins	Nominations	Wins	Nominations	Wins
1973	Badlands			1			
1978	Days of Heaven	4	1	1	1	2	
1998	The Thin Red Line	7					
2005	The New World	1					
2011	The Tree of Life	3					
Total		15	1	2	1	2	0
