= Simon Franglen =

English musician

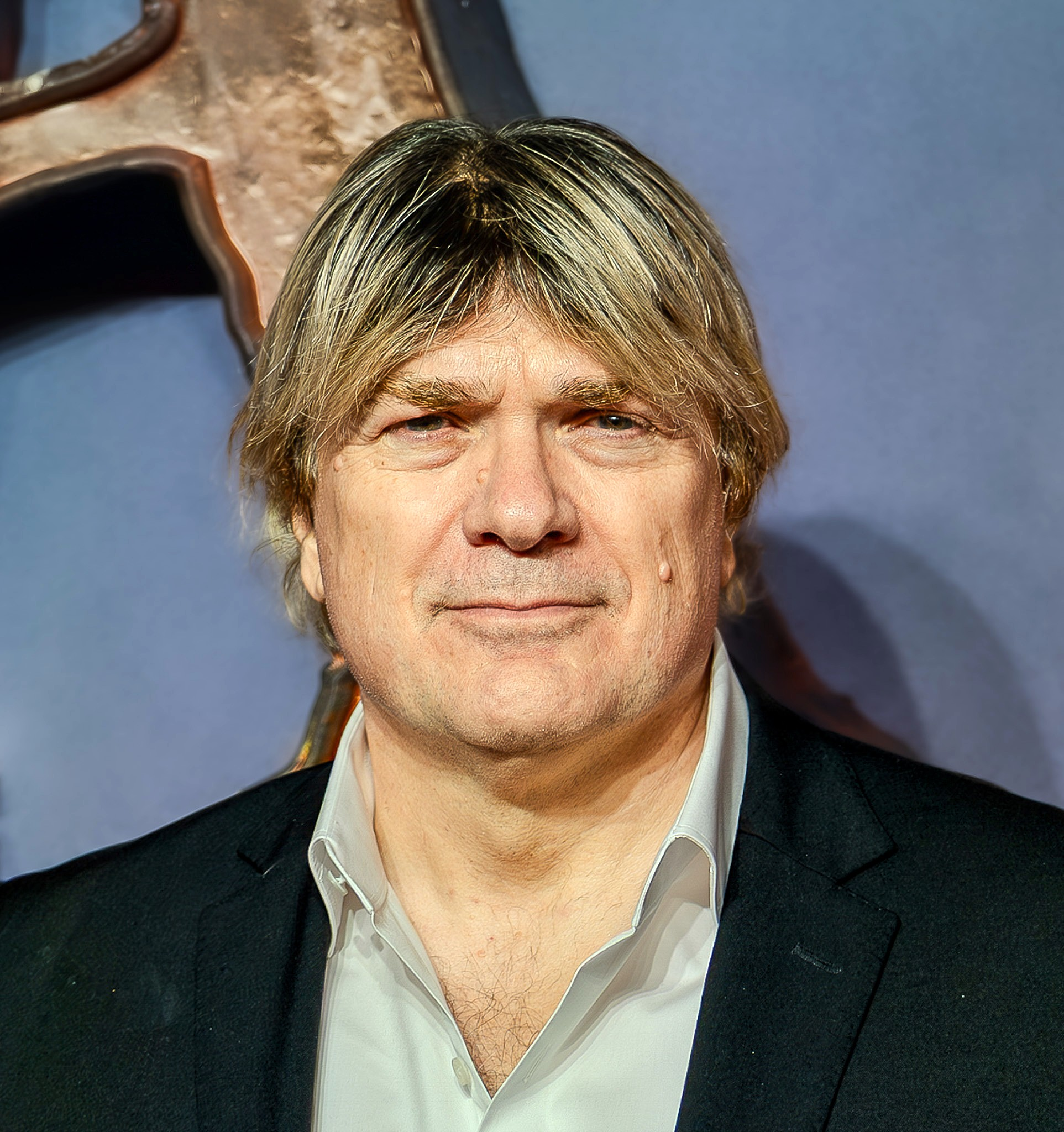
- Franglen in 2025

Background information
- Born: 26 May 1963 (age 63); Westminster, London, England, U.K.
- Genres: Film score, soundtrack, pop, electronic, ambient, adult contemporary, soft rock
- Occupations: Film composer, record producer, songwriter, arranger, musician
- Instruments: Piano, keyboards, synthesizer, synclavier
- Years active: 1989–present
- Labels: Milan Records, Sony Classical, Lakeshore Records, Walt Disney Records, KPM Trailers, Bosworth & Co
- Website: www.simonfranglen.com

Simon Franglen (born 26 May 1963) is an English composer of classical and film music. He is also a record producer and former musician. His credits include four of the list of top grossing films and six of the list of best-selling albums of all time.

His film work includes a number of well-known movies, including Avatar, for which he received Golden Globe and Grammy nominations for the theme song, and for being the producer of "My Heart Will Go On" from Titanic, for which he won a Record of The Year Grammy Award. Other film credits range from David Fincher's Seven, The Amazing Spider-Man, The Magnificent Seven, to arranging music for the James Bond films Skyfall and Spectre.

== Music career ==
Franglen has worked with Celine Dion, Whitney Houston, Madonna, Barbra Streisand, Quincy Jones, David Foster, Toni Braxton, The Corrs, Monica, Bee Gees, Luciano Pavarotti. Currently there are over four hundred music credits to Franglen on AllMusic.

=== Early career ===
After showing skill with synthesizers whilst working in London recording studios as a student, Franglen was hired by Trevor Horn as a Synclavier programmer, working on Yes, Frankie Goes To Hollywood, Godley and Creme. He left Sarm West Studios to become an independent producer for acts like The Associates and a composer for commercials and TV. He composed the famous Direct Line jingle.

=== Pop work ===
Franglen was persuaded by engineer/producer Humberto Gatica to move to the US, where he became a top Los Angeles session musician and programmer. Alongside his career on film music, Franglen has been involved in a huge number of singles and albums that have charted highly, since the early 1990s. These include: "Un-Break My Heart" (Toni Braxton) "Change The World" (Eric Clapton) "For You I Will" (Monica) "I Swear" (All 4 One) "I Have Nothing" (Whitney Houston) "No Matter What" (Boyzone) and his remix of E.Y.C.'s "One More Chance" was the leading version on the single release which peaked at number 25 in the UK charts. He has produced a wide variety of material, from UK grime rappers such as Ironik and Chip to classical tenors including Rolando Villazon.

=== Film score work ===
Franglen moved into film music when he was introduced to the composer John Barry late in the production of the score for Dances with Wolves and collaborated on the soundtrack album. He continued to work with Barry for a number of years, including on Chaplin. Other long-term collaborations were with the film composers Alan Silvestri, James Horner, and Howard Shore, for whom he created the trademark dystopian electronic for Seven by David Fincher.

He worked with producer David Foster on the soundtrack for The Bodyguard and later, produced Nicole Kidman and Ewan McGregor's "Come What May" with Foster for director Baz Luhrmann's Moulin Rouge!, where he separately acted as vocal producer for the film songs. In 1997, he worked for the first time with James Horner on the score for Titanic, for which he won a Grammy Award as producer of "My Heart Will Go On". He reconnected with Horner for Avatar, spending almost 11 months working on the score; he acted as Electronic Music Arranger and also co-wrote and co-produced the Golden Globe and Grammy-nominated theme song. Horner and Franglen continued to work closely together from 2009 on films such as The Amazing Spider-Man, Franglen initially acting as arranger, then moving to score producer.

=== Recent work ===
In 2016, a year after the death of his friend and colleague, James Horner, Franglen co-composed the score to The Magnificent Seven, which Horner had commenced. He won an ASCAP award for his work. 2016 also included original music for director Terrence Malick's film Voyage of Time.

In December 2016, he premiered a new fifteen minute 3-dimensional orchestral immersive work in what CNN called 'The World's Highest Art Space' - a 240 speaker immersive experience featuring four separate complete orchestral parts, Chinese Solo instruments, choir and bells on the 2000 ft high 126th floor of the Shanghai Tower, Shanghai, China.

In early 2017, he worked with Pink Floyd at Abbey Road Studios, producing 3D mixes of some of their best known tracks for an immersive installation room at the Victoria and Albert Museum exhibition, Pink Floyd: Their Mortal Remains. Over 400,000 people visited the exhibition and the installation will tour around the world.

Franglen was responsible for the production and further composition of the music throughout Pandora–The World of Avatar which opened at Walt Disney World in Florida in May 2017, taking over duties from James Horner in 2015. In 2018, an album of selected music from the park was released by Walt Disney Music album.

He scored Together, a film by director Terrence Malick which premiered at SXSW in late 2017 and at the 2018 Tribeca Film Festival. In 2018, he composed the scores to Peppermint directed by Pierre Morel, the MGM TV series The Truth About the Harry Quebert Affair by director Jean-Jacques Annaud.

In 2019, he premiered a new large-scale orchestral and choral work for live performance, the oratorio "The Birth of Skies and Earth", based on the great Chinese creation myths. A ninety-minute work, with libretto in Mandarin Chinese, it premiered in Shanghai, with 176 musicians on stage, featuring a 90-piece orchestra, 80-voice choir, and six solo singers. Subsequently, it toured around China.

In late 2019, he composed the score to Xiaolong Zheng's Turandot, The Three Bracelets, a large-budget Chinese historical action fantasy for release in 2021.

In late 2020, he composed the score to the documentary film about the saving of the Timbuktu Manuscripts from Jihadists – The Bad-Ass Librarians of Timbuktu (based on the novel The Bad-Ass Librarians of Timbuktu), directed by Otto Bell.

In early 2021, he will be composing the score to the mythological epic, Brahmastra, directed by Ayan Mukerji. In late 2022, he will premiere a new opera.

In 2019 it was announced that he had been hired to write new songs and music for Avatar: The Way of Water and Avatar: Fire and Ash.

=== Other work ===
Franglen accompanied Barbra Streisand for her first live performance in 27 years at the Inauguration of President Bill Clinton in Washington DC. He also toured with her for the subsequent comeback tour.

== Recognition and awards ==
On 24 February 1999 Franglen won the Grammy Award for Record of the Year for producing the Celine Dion song "My Heart Will Go On", which was used in the movie Titanic.

At the 21st edition of the Ischia Global Film & Music Festival in Italy, Franglen won the Ischia Film & Music Award.

On 25 June 2024 Franglen was invited into the Academy of Motion Picture Arts and Sciences for his work on Avatar: The Way of Water and The Magnificent Seven.

== Personal life ==
The composer and producer Nick Franglen is his brother. The musician and writer Hans Keller was his great uncle.

Franglen suffers from hereditary Otosclerosis and has worn hearing aids since the early 2010s.

== Film credits ==
- Downtown (1990) - Alan Silvestri - Synthesizer Programming
- Shattered (1991) - Alan Silvestri - Keyboards, Synclavier Programming
- Ricochet (1991) - Alan Silvestri - Additional Synthesizer Programming
- Grand Canyon (1991) - James Newton Howard - Synclavier Programming
- The Bodyguard (1992) - Alan Silvestri - Synthesizer Programming
- FernGully: The Last Rainforest (1992) - Alan Silvestri - Synclavier Programming
- Sidekicks (1992) - Alan Silvestri - Synclavier Programming, Synthesizers, Drum Programming
- Cool Runnings (1993) - Hans Zimmer - Synclavier Programming
- Cop and a Half (1993) - Alan Silvestri - Synthesizer Programming
- Seven (1995) - Howard Shore - Programming
- Crash (1996) - Howard Shore - Electronic Music Preparation
- The Preacher's Wife (1996) - Hans Zimmer - Additional Synthesizer Programming
- Space Jam (1996) - James Newton Howard - Synclavier Programming
- Contact (1997) - Alan Silvestri - Synclavier Programming
- Volcano (1997) - Alan Silvestri - Synthesizer Programming
- Titanic (1997) - James Horner - Synthesizers, Instrumental Solo, Producer "My Heart Will Go On"
- Quest for Camelot (1998) - Patrick Doyle - Additional Synthesizer Programming
- Moulin Rouge! (2001) - Craig Armstrong - Producer, Vocal Production, Engineer
- Avatar (2009) - James Horner - Electronic Music Arranger, Composer - Theme song (Golden Globe nomination)
- The Karate Kid (2010) - James Horner - Synthesizer Programming
- The Amazing Spider-Man (2012) - James Horner - Arranger
- Skyfall (2012) - Thomas Newman - Arranger, Programming
- Wolf Totem (2015) - James Horner - Score Producer, Arranger
- Southpaw (2015) - James Horner - Score Producer, Arranger
- The 33 (2015) - James Horner - Score Producer, Arranger
- Spectre (2015) - Thomas Newman - Arranger, Synthesizer Programming
- The Magnificent Seven (2016) - James Horner & Simon Franglen - Co-composer
- Living in the Age of Airplanes (2016) - James Horner - Score Producer, Arranger
- Ice (2016) - Series Composer
- Voyage of Time (2016) - Composer
- Terrence Malick's 'Together' (2018) - Composer
- The Truth About the Harry Quebert Affair (2018) - Composer
- Peppermint (2018) - Composer
- Turandot, The Three Bracelets (2019 / 2020) - Composer
- Notre-Dame on Fire (2022) - Composer
- Brahmāstra: Part One – Shiva (2022) - Composer (score)
- Avatar: The Way of Water (2022) - Composer, Conductor
- Avatar: Fire and Ash (2025) - Composer, Conductor

== Music credits ==
- River of Love (1990) - David Foster - Synclavier Programming
- Rechording (1991) - David Foster - Arranger, Programming
- Dreams to Dream (1991) - Linda Ronstadt - Synclavier Programming
- Attitude & Virtue (1991) - Corey Hart - Engineer, Arranger, Synclavier Programming, Assistant Producer
- Femme Fatale (1992) - Miki Howard - Synclavier Programming
- World Falling Down (1992) - Peter Cetera - Synclavier Programming
- The Vanishing Race (1993) - Air Supply - Synclavier Programming
- The Colour of My Love (1993) - Celine Dion - Synclavier Programming
- Back to Broadway (1993) - Barbra Streisand - Synclavier Programming
- The One Thing (1993) - Michael Bolton - Additional Synthesizer Programming
- Groove On (1994) - Gerald LeVert - Synclavier Programming
- Dream Away (1994) - Babyface & Lisa Stansfield - Synclavier Programming
- Through the Fire (1994) - Peabo Bryson - Synclavier Programming
- Love Lights the World (1994) - David Foster - Synclavier Programming
- Join the Band (1994) - Take 6 - Synclavier Programming, Drum Programming
- Something to Remember (1995) - Madonna - Synclavier Programming
- Q's Jook Joint (1995) - Quincy Jones - Synthesizer Programming
- HIStory (1995) - Michael Jackson - Keyboards, Drum Programming, Percussion, Synthesizer Programming, Synclavier Programming
- Remember Me This Way (1995) - Jordan Hill - Synclavier Programming
- Secrets (1996) - Toni Braxton - Synclavier Programming
- Falling into You (1996) - Celine Dion - Synclavier Programming
- For You I Will (1997) - Monica - Synclavier Programming
- My Heart Will Go On (1997) - Celine Dion - Producer, Arranger, Keyboards, Drum Programming, Synthesizer Programming, Synclavier Programming, Bass
- Open Road (1997) - Gary Barlow - Synclavier Programming, Drum Programming
- Love is a Miracle (1997) - Andy Lau - Producer, Arranger, Keyboards, Drum Programming, Synclavier Programming, Bass
- EV3 (1997) - En Vogue - Synclavier Programming
- Flesh and Bone (1997) - Richard Marx - Synclavier Programming, Keyboard Programming, Keyboards, Drum Programming
- Let's Talk About Love (1997) - Celine Dion - Synclavier Programming
- My Love is Your Love (1998) - Whitney Houston - Synclavier Programming
- Never Say Never (1998) - Brandy - Synclavier Programming
- Mona Lisa's Tears (1998) - Terry Lin - Synclavier Programming
- Where We Belong (1998) - Boyzone - Associate Producer, Arranger, Keyboards, Engineer, Drum Programming
- Whistle Down The Wind (1998) - Tina Arena - Producer, Arranger, Keyboard Programming, Engineer
- One Wish (1999) - Deborah Cox - Synclavier Programming
- "Come What May" (2001) Nicole Kidman and Ewan McGregor - Producer, Programming, Vocal Producer
- The Heat (2000) - Toni Braxton - Keyboards, Programming
- Tiny Dancer (Hold Me Closer) (2009) - Ironik, Chip (rapper), Elton John
- A New Day Has Come (2002) - Celine Dion - Producer, Arranger, Keyboards, Synthesizer Programming
- Pulse (2010) - Toni Braxton - Producer

== Installations and 3D ==
- Shanghai Tower
- Pink Floyd: Their Mortal Remains
- Pandora–The World of Avatar
