= Paul Atkins (cinematographer) =

American cinematographer and director

- Born: Paul Atkins; Mobile, Alabama, U.S.
- Education: Florida State University; University of Hawaii at Manoa
- Occupations: Cinematographer, Director
- Years active: 1982–present
- Organization: American Society of Cinematographers
- Awards: British Academy of Film and Television Arts; 1991 The Trials of Life; 1994 Life in the Freezer

Paul Atkins, ASC, is an American cinematographer and director specializing in natural history films. Atkins is known for the footage of killer whales preying on seal pups in the BBC's The Trials of Life (1990), for which he won a British Academy of Film and Television Arts (BAFTA) award. Atkins also was the director of photography for the Cape Horn unit for the feature film Master and Commander, which won an Academy Award for Cinematography by Russell Boyd. Atkins has been nominated for an Emmy award numerous times, winning it for his work in Great White Shark (1995) (Cinematography), and Hawaii: Strangers in Paradise (1991) (Cinematography, Outstanding Cultural Programming). Recently he has formed a partnership with Terrence Malick, serving as a second-unit director for The Tree of Life (2011), and as director of photography for Malick's eighth feature Voyage of Time (2016).

Atkins' union affiliation is with IATSE Atkins resides in Hawaii, where he has also worked locally such as shooting commercials for Hawaiian Electric Company and U.S. Senator Daniel Inouye. He works together with his wife, Grace Atkins, in their company Moana Productions.

== Filmography ==
Year	Title	Director	Notes

== Natural history career ==
Atkins moved to Hawaii in 1974 to pursue a doctorate in marine biology at the University of Hawaii, and began working in the film business as an underwater and wildlife cinematographer.

=== The Trials of Life ===
Atkins shot the killer whale sequence for the 1990 BBC series The Trials of Life with his friend Mike deGruy. Series presenter David Attenborough described the footage as one of the most spectacular wildlife sequences ever filmed, and it won Atkins a BAFTA and helped establish his reputation as a nature cinematographer. He has also filmed underwater with molten lava flowing into the sea off the Big Island of Hawaii.

=== Planet Earth ===
Atkins shot several sequences for the BBC series Planet Earth,including manta rays at night in Hawaii and dolphins and sea lions herding schools of fish in Patagonia.

=== Documentaries and feature films ===
With his wife and producing partner, Grace Atkins, he directed documentaries including the Emmy-winning Hawaii: Strangers in Paradise and Great White Shark, and Dolphins: The Wild Side. For Master and Commander: The Far Side of the World,he filmed on a 40-day voyage around Cape Horn, and the film won the 2004 Academy Award for Best Cinematography for Russell Boyd. His second-unit work on The Tree of Lifecontributed to that film's Oscar nomination for cinematography; he continued working with Terrence Malick on To the Wonder, Knight of Cups and the IMAX documentary Voyage of Time. He also worked on Alejandro González Iñárritu's The Revenant as a second-unit cinematographer.
