= The Tree of Life (soundtrack) =

The Tree of Life: Original Motion Picture Soundtrack

Film score by Alexandre Desplat
- Released: May 24, 2011
- Genre: Film score
- Label: Lakeshore Records

Alexandre Desplat chronology
The King's Speech (2010)	The Tree of Life: Original Motion Picture Soundtrack (2011)	La Fille du Puisatier (2011)

Professional ratings
Review scores
Source	Rating
AllMusic	4/5 stars
Empire	4/5 stars
Film Score Click Track	4/5 stars
Movie Music UK	2.5/5 stars
Movie Wave	4.5/5 stars

The Tree of Life: Original Motion Picture Soundtrack is the official soundtrack album for the 2011 drama film The Tree of Life directed by Terrence Malick. Composed by Alexandre Desplat, the soundtrack was released by Lakeshore Records on May 24, 2011.

Although billed as the film's soundtrack, only a few minutes of this album are found in the film. The film and its teaser trailer also includes pieces of music such as the Vltava (also known as the Moldau) of Bedřich Smetana and Ottorino Respighi's Ancient Airs and Dances Suite No. 3.

== Track listing ==
All tracks are written by Alexandre Desplat.

No.	Title	Length
1.	"Childhood"	3:41
2.	"Circles"	11:23
3.	"Clouds"	2:59
4.	"River"	3:35
5.	"Awakening"	3:29
6.	"Emergence of Life"	3:55
7.	"Light & Darkness"	8:17
8.	"Good & Evil"	3:15
9.	"Motherhood"	2:04
10.	"City of Glass"	3:37
11.	"Fatherhood"	2:49
12.	"Temptation"	6:47
13.	"Skies"	5:18
