= The Magnificent Seven (2016 soundtrack) =

The Magnificent Seven (Original Motion Picture Soundtrack)

Film score by James Horner and Simon Franglen
- Released: September 16, 2016
- Recorded: 2016
- Genre: Film score
- Length: 78:26
- Label: Sony Classical
- Producers: Simon Franglen; Simon Rhodes

James Horner chronology
Living in the Age of Airplanes (2016)	The Magnificent Seven (2016)

Simon Franglen chronology
The Magnificent Seven (2016)	Voyage of Time (2016)

The Magnificent Seven (Original Motion Picture Soundtrack) is the soundtrack to the 2016 film The Magnificent Seven, which is a remake of the 1960 film of the same name. Directed by Antoine Fuqua, the film stars Denzel Washington, Chris Pratt and Ethan Hawke. The film features an original score composed by late James Horner and Simon Franglen. The score was released through Sony Classical Records on September 16, 2016, becoming Horner's fourth score to be released posthumously.

== Development ==
Fuqua met James Horner to compose the score for the film, but before the film's production commenced, he died in a plane crash on June 22, 2015. The following month, during the premiere of Southpaw (2015), Fuqua revealed that Horner had begun working on the film's music before his death and intended it to present as a surprise.

Horner had written seven themes that run for nearly 15 minutes for the film while his close friend and producer-arranger Simon Franglen had completed those themes while also composed new material for the film. Franglen recalled that he had to deliver the score that serves as Horner's tribute and also sets the appropriate tone for the film, which was reminiscent of Elmer Bernstein's original score for the 1960 film. Franglen said that, "We needed to make sure that the language developed by Elmer was referenced in some way because anyone who loves film music is going to say that Elmer’s score is exquisite [...] But it was very obvious, also, that it was of its time when you put it against this film."

Franglen went for a contemporary action score with a classical undertone and organic instruments—guitar, strings and percussions. Instead of using electronic synthesizers, he went with clapping as rhythm. He took the composer's piano demos and developed them as score suite with recordist-mixer Simon Rhodes. Fuqua and the executives at Metro-Goldwyn-Mayer approved the decision to adapt Horner's themes into a full score. Horner's colleagues—orchestrator/conductor J.A.C. Redford, and music editors Joe E. Rand and Jim Henrikson—worked on the film score. Redford supervised the 80-piece orchestra performed Hollywood Studio Symphony, with featuring musicians—ethnic flautist Tony Hinnigan and guitarist George Doering also contributed to the score who also worked in Horner's The 33. A three-member choir performed wordless vocals for the action sequences, and Franglen tortured two banjos as the sound for the antagonist.

It took several months for curating the film's score which runs for 107 minutes. Franglen and Horner served the credit for the music contribution while Rhodes was credited for additional music. The score was released through Sony Classical Records on September 16, 2016, a week prior to the film's release. The score was Horner's fourth film score to be released posthumously after Southpaw, Living in the Age of Airplanes and The 33, as well as Horner's final film score to be composed in his career. The score also features the original theme from the 1960 film which would be available only in digital streaming services.

== Critical reception ==
Filmtracks.com reviewed "The Magnificent Seven is merely a fascinating academic study, a thoughtful expression of love for a composer lost before his time." James Southall of Movie Wave wrote "The Magnificent Seven isn’t quite the glorious swansong I had selfishly craved it to be, but for what it is, it does the job."

Sean Wilson of Mfiles described the score as "a rousing, rollicking reminder of why Horner's remarkable talent will be missed, but will also continue to live on in our hearts and minds". Pete Simons of Synchrotones wrote "Franglen does a good job making the score as melodic as possible (and for all the darkness, we do get a pretty rousing finale)" and gave 4.5 out of 5. GQ wrote "The score for the new Magnificent Seven, by the late James Horner and Simon Franglen, quotes Bernstein extensively, but it's a sign of the film's joylessness that it doesn't go full Bernstein until the closing credits, when the Aaron Copland-esque percussion and strings finally come alive." Wendy Ide of The Guardian reviewed that the score "hits every western-genre cliche in the book: from hoedown fiddle to Aaron Copland-style Americana."

== Track listing ==
The Magnificent Seven (Original Motion Picture Soundtrack) track listing
No.	Title	Length
1.	"Rose Creek Oppression"	1:54
2.	"Seven Angels of Vengeance"	3:24
3.	"Lighting the Fuse"	1:21
4.	"Volcano Springs"	2:56
5.	"Street Slaughter"	3:22
6.	"Devil in the Church"	2:06
7.	"Chisolm Enrolled"	3:10
8.	"Magic Trick"	2:37
9.	"Robicheaux Reunion"	1:47
10.	"A Bear in Peoples Clothes"	2:01
11.	"Red Harvest"	2:02
12.	"Takedown"	5:50
13.	"Town Exodus – Knife Training"	2:10
14.	"7 Days, that's all You Got"	1:49
15.	"So Far So Good"	4:32
16.	"Sheriff Demoted"	1:58
17.	"Pacing the Town"	3:53
18.	"The Deserter"	4:52
19.	"Bell Hangers"	1:43
20.	"Army Invades Town"	3:34
21.	"Faraday's Ride"	4:03
22.	"Horne Sacrifice"	2:42
23.	"The Darkest Hour"	4:28
24.	"House of Judgment"	5:25
25.	"Seven Riders"	2:58
Total length:		78:26

iTunes bonus track
No.	Title	Length
26.	"The Magnificent Seven" (composed by Elmer Bernstein)	1:49
Total length:		80:15

== Personnel ==
Credits adapted from CD liner notes:

- Music – James Horner, Simon Franglen
- Additional music, mixing – Simon Rhodes
- Music production, programming and arrangement – Simon Franglen, Simon Rhodes
- Recording – Kevin Globerman, Simon Rhodes
- Music editors – Jim Henrikson, Joe E. Rand
- Copyist – Ross DeRoche
- Liner notes – Simon Franglen
- Booklet design – WLP Ltd.
- Licensing (Sony Classical) – Mark Cavell
- Product development (Sony Classical) – Klara Korytowska

Orchestra

- Orchestration – Carl Johnson, J.A.C. Redford, Steven Baker
- Orchestra conductor – Carl Johnson, J.A.C. Redford
- Orchestra contractor – Gina Zimmitti
- Concertmaster – Roger Wilkie

Instruments

- Bass – Chris Kollgaard, Drew Dembowski, Ed Meares, Geoff Osika, Ian Walker, Mike Valerio, Oscar Hidalgo, Nico Abondolo
- Cello – Armen Ksajikian, Carolyn Litchfield, Cecilia Tsan, Charles Tyler, Dennis Karmazyn, Giovanna Clayton, Jacob Braun, Laszlo Mezo, Tim Loo, Trevor Handy, Vanessa Freebairn Smith, Steve Erdody
- Flute – Tony Hinnegan
- Guitar – George Doering
- Horn – Allen Fogle, Daniel Kelley, Jenny Kim, Laura Brenes, Mark Adams, Steve Becknell, Dylan Hart
- Timpani – Wade Culbreath
- Trombone – Bill Reichenbach, Phil Keen, Steve Holtman, Bill Booth, Alex Iles
- Trumpet – Barry Perkins, Dan Rosenboom, Jon Lewis
- Tuba – Ross DeRoche
- Viola – Alma Fernandez, Andrew Duckles, Carolyn Riley, Darrin McCann, David Walther, Erik Rynearson, Laura Pearson, Luke Maurer, Matt Funes, Rob Brophy, Shawn Mann, Thomas Diener, Brian Dembow
- Violin – Alyssa Park, Amy Hershberger, Benjamin Powell, Ben Jacobson, Bruce Dukov, Charlie Bisharat, Christian Hebel, Darius Campo, Eun Mee Ahn, Jackie Brand, Joel Derouin, Joel Pargman, Josefina Vergara, Katie Sloan, Katia Popov, Kevin Kumar, Lucia Micarelli, Maia Jasper, Mark Robertson, Natalie Leggett, Neel Hammond, Nina Evtuhov, Phil Levy, Radu Pieptea, Roberto Cani, Sara Parkins, Serena McKinney, Shalini Vijayan, Sharon Jackson, Songa Lee, Tammy Hatwan, Tereza Stanislav, Yelena Yegoryan, Peter Kent
- Voice – Clydene Jackson, Kristy Swift, Lottie Rhodes

== Chart performance ==
Chart performance for The Magnificent Seven (Original Motion Picture Soundtrack)
Chart (2016)	Peak position
UK Soundtrack Albums (OCC)	38
