= Thy Kingdom Come (film) =

2018 American short film

- Directed by: Eugene Richards
- Produced by: Javier Bardem
- Starring: Javier Bardem
- Release date: March 10, 2018 (South by Southwest)
- Running time: 43 minutes
- Country: United States
- Language: English

Thy Kingdom Come is a 2018 American documentary short film directed by Eugene Richards and starring Javier Bardem. It is a spinoff of Terrence Malick's 2012 feature film To the Wonder with Bardem playing the same Midwestern priest character. Thy Kingdom Come consists of cut footage from To the Wonder.

== Summary ==
With Bardem playing the role of Catholic parish priest Father Quintana, the film follows unscripted conversations and interactions between the real-life residents of a small Oklahoma town. The residents remain unaware that Bardem is playing a fictional priest as they share their lives of hardship, longing, and hope, including stories from individuals such as a loveless elderly woman, an inmate who's waited weeks for a letter, a Ku Klux Klansman seeking redemption, etc.

== Cast ==
- Javier Bardem
- Callie Elred
- Tasia Moore

== Release ==
Thy Kingdom Come premiered at the South by Southwest Film Festival on March 10, 2018.

== Reception ==
Bradley Gibson of Film Threat gave the film a 7 out of 10.
