= Voyage of Time =

2016 film by Terrence Malick

- Theatrical release poster
- Directed by: Terrence Malick
- Written by: Terrence Malick
- Produced by: Dede Gardner; Nicolas Gonda; Sarah Green; Grant Hill; Brad Pitt; Bill Pohlad; Sophokles Tasioulis
- Narrated by: Brad Pitt; Cate Blanchett (feature-length version)
- Cinematography: Paul Atkins
- Edited by: Rehman Ali; Keith Fraase
- Music by: Simon Franglen; Hanan Townshend
- Production companies: IMAX Documentary Films Capital; Knights of Columbus; Broad Green Pictures; Sophisticated Films
- Distributed by: IMAX Corporation
- Release dates: September 7, 2016 (Venice); October 7, 2016 (IMAX)
- Running time: 40 minutes (IMAX); 90 minutes (35 mm)
- Country: United States
- Language: English
- Budget: $12 million

Voyage of Time is a 2016 American experimental documentary film written and directed by Terrence Malick. The film is said to be an examination of the birth and death of the known universe. Malick had been working on the film for over forty years and it has been described by Malick himself as "one of my greatest dreams".

Voyage of Time was released in two versions: a forty-minute IMAX version with narration by Brad Pitt, and a 35-millimetre feature-length edition (also known as Voyage of Time: Life's Journey) narrated by Cate Blanchett. The feature-length edition was selected to compete for the Golden Lion at the 73rd Venice International Film Festival. The IMAX version of the film was released on October 7, 2016, by IMAX Corporation. Both versions of Voyage of Time were met with favorable responses from critics.

== Synopsis ==
Voyage of Time is a celebration of the universe, displaying the whole of time, from its start to its final collapse. This film examines all that occurred to prepare the world that stands before us now: science and spirit, birth and death, the grand cosmos and the minute life systems of our planet.

== Cast ==
- Brad Pitt as Narrator (IMAX version)
- Cate Blanchett as Narrator (35-millimetre feature-length edition)

== Production ==
=== Development ===
The origins of Voyage of Time stem back to the late 1970s when Malick began developing a project for Paramount, titled Q, that explored the origins of life on earth. Production began with Paramount Pictures backing the film with $1 million. Malick ended up walking away from the project, though elements and footage from Q were later used for The Tree of Life (2011), and Voyage of Time. Brad Pitt was confirmed to narrate the film in 2009, while Cate Blanchett joined in 2014. Emma Thompson also joined in 2011 and recorded narration, but she was ultimately cut from the finished production.

=== Filming ===
Filming for Voyage of Time has been undertaken all over the world. At the Cannes Film Festival market screening of Voyage of Time in 2014, Malick and his producers showed footage shot in locations such as Southwestern U.S, Hawaii, Iceland, Monterey, Chile, Palau, Solomon Islands, Papua New Guinea and elsewhere.

=== Post-production ===
Dan Glass (The Matrix trilogy) is said to be the special effects supervisor on the film, with Douglas Trumbull (2001: A Space Odyssey, Close Encounters of the Third Kind, Blade Runner) as his consultant.

== Lawsuit ==
In July 2013, the film was the subject of a lawsuit, after backers of the film, Seven Seas, sued Sycamore Pictures, claiming that "Malick did little or no work on what is supposed to be a trio of projects", and that Malick was only allowed to work on other projects if it didn't interfere with the documentary, despite beginning work on The Tree of Life, To the Wonder, Knight of Cups and Song to Song during the production stage of Voyage of Time. Seven Seas further claimed that “Sycamore [Pictures] has blown through nearly $6 million over the last six years on this project with nothing to show for it... Our contract specified that funds were to be used exclusively for Voyage of Time but we believe some were redirected to other films Malick was producing during that period, in flagrant disregard for our agreement.”

In September 2013, Malick's lawyer commented on the matter stating: "The claims of Seven Seas are without merit. The film was on budget, on schedule, and all funds were used appropriately." They later followed up with their own filing, which alleges that Seven Seas "concocted the story told in its Complaint" as it "either ran out of, or never had, the funds necessary to meet its financing obligations". In February 2014, a deal was made to pay Seven Seas back in nine months.

== Release ==
In February 2015, Broad Green Pictures acquired distribution rights to the film. The feature-length version of the film had its world premiere at the Venice Film Festival. It also screened at the Toronto International Film Festival. The film was released on IMAX on October 7, 2016.

== Reception ==
The IMAX version of the film holds a 77 out of 100 on Metacritic based on 11 reviews, indicating "generally favourable reviews". On Rotten Tomatoes it has a rating of 90% based on 30 reviews, and an average rating of 6.7/10. The consensus states: "Voyage of Time marries dazzling nature footage and painterly visual effects to give audiences a tour through the universe that is by turns beguiling and profound."

In The New York Times, A. O. Scott called it a "fusion of digital imagery and photographic imagination that seems at once utterly natural and completely impossible."

The feature-length version holds a 68/100 on Metacritic, based on 10 reviews, indicating "generally favourable reviews". On Rotten Tomatoes it has a 68% approval rating, based on 28 reviews, and an average rating of 5.8/10. The consensus states: "Voyage of Time: Life's Journey might be minor Malick, but for acolytes -- or viewers up for an absorbingly deliberate look at the cosmos -- it's well worth a watch."
