= To the Wonder =

2012 film by Terrence Malick

- Theatrical release poster
- Directed by: Terrence Malick
- Written by: Terrence Malick
- Produced by: Sarah Green; Nicolas Gonda
- Starring: Ben Affleck; Olga Kurylenko; Rachel McAdams; Javier Bardem
- Cinematography: Emmanuel Lubezki
- Edited by: A. J. Edwards; Keith Fraase; Shane Hazen; Christopher Roldan; Mark Yoshikawa
- Music by: Hanan Townshend
- Production company: Brothers K Productions
- Distributed by: Magnolia Pictures
- Release dates: September 2, 2012 (Venice); April 12, 2013 (United States)
- Running time: 112 minutes
- Country: United States
- Languages: English; French; Spanish; Italian
- Box office: $2.7 million

To the Wonder is a 2012 American experimental romantic drama film written and directed by Terrence Malick and starring Ben Affleck, Olga Kurylenko, Rachel McAdams, and Javier Bardem. Filmed in Oklahoma and Paris, the semi-autobiographical film chronicles a couple who, after falling in love in Paris, struggle to keep their relationship from falling apart after moving to the United States. The film premiered in competition at the 2012 Venice Film Festival, where it was nominated for the Golden Lion Award. It received mixed reactions at its premiere in Venice but was awarded the SIGNIS Award at the same festival. The film continued to polarize critics upon its theatrical release, with many praising Malick's direction and Lubezki's cinematography, though finding the narrative emotionally unsatisfying.

== Plot ==
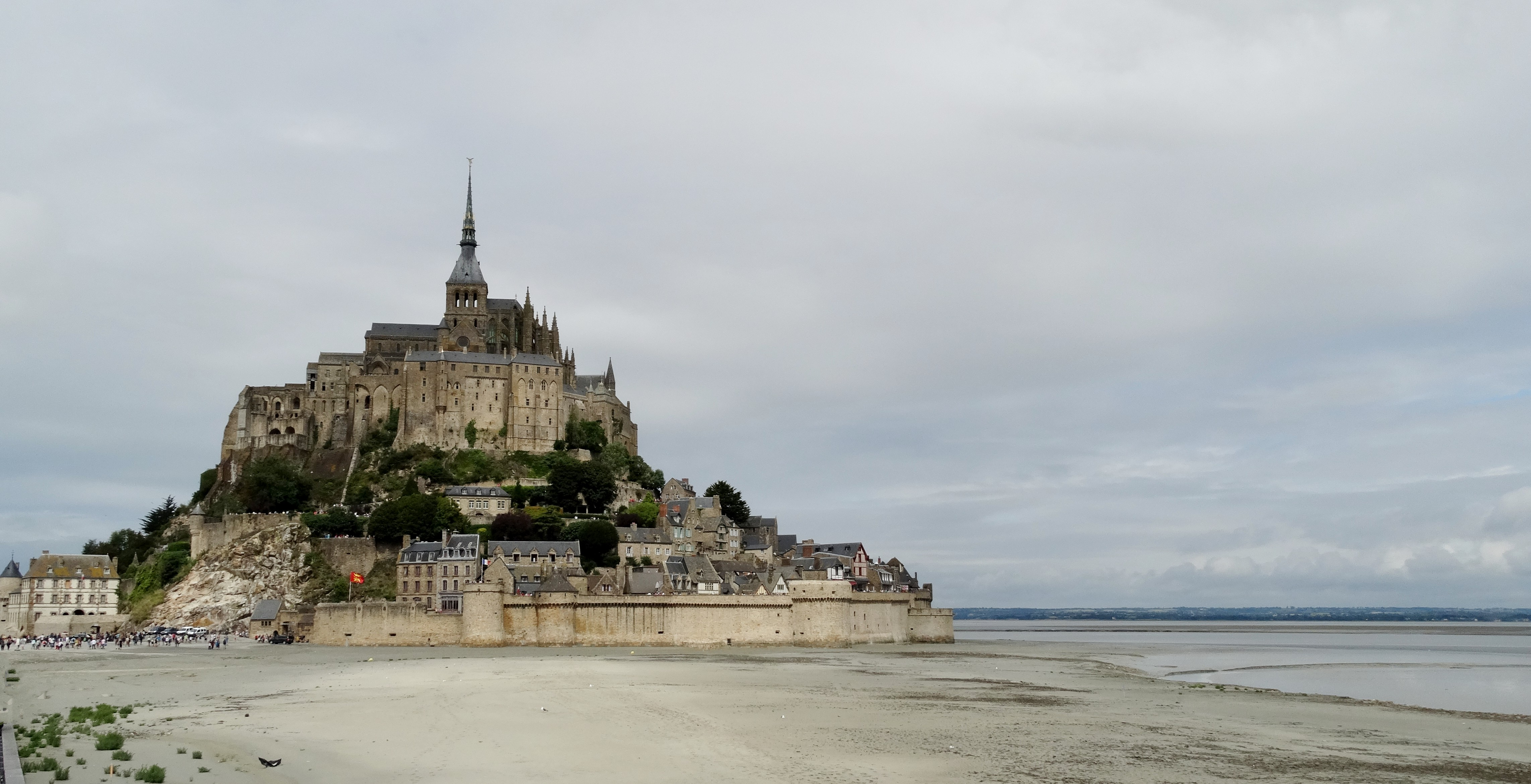
Mont-Saint-Michel serves as a pivotal location for the beginning of To the Wonder

Neil is an American traveling in Europe who in Paris meets and falls in love with Marina, a Ukrainian divorcée living with her ten-year-old daughter Tatiana. Basking in their new romance, the lovers travel to Mont St. Michel, the island abbey off the coast of Normandy. Neil commits to Marina, inviting her to relocate with Tatiana to his native Oklahoma. Neil takes a job as an environmental inspector, and Marina settles into her life in the United States. After some time, the couple's passionate romance cools. Marina finds solace with the Catholic priest Father Quintana, who is undergoing his own crisis of faith. Tatiana begins to feel homesick due to not having made friends at her school and complains that Neil is not her real father. Sometime later, Marina tells Neil that her visa has expired, and she and her daughter return to France.

Continuing his work as an environmental inspector, Neil reconnects with Jane, a childhood friend. Jane tells Neil very quietly that her farm is going bankrupt because her former husband encumbered it with his huge gambling debt. Neil begins a romance with Jane. Back in France, after giving Tatiana back to her father (Marina's former husband), Marina finds she misses Oklahoma and is unable to find a job. Due to Neil's unwillingness to commit to Jane, their relationship disintegrates.

Returning to Oklahoma, Marina reconnects with Neil. The couple marry in a civil ceremony for Marina to be allowed to permanently stay. After going to the doctor to discuss removing an intrauterine device to be able to conceive, Marina begins to feel isolated again. Although they also had a religious wedding ceremony, the couple's relationship begins to deteriorate over frequent arguments. Meanwhile, Father Quintana ministers to prisoners and local people. One day, Marina approaches Charlie, a carpenter who had given her a wind harp. She follows him to a motel where the two have a tryst. While in a drive-through at a fast food restaurant, Marina confesses the event to Neil and asks his forgiveness. In anger, Neil pulls over and leaves Marina stranded by the road. Shortly after, Neil returns to pick her up.

Neil later seeks counseling from Father Quintana. Marina appears to have borne a child since her encounter with Charlie but there is ambiguity about the identity of its father. Neil accompanies the priest as he ministers to the poor, learning forgiveness and humility. Eventually offering Marina forgiveness, Neil kneels before her and kisses her hands. Neil and Marina appear to divorce, and they are last seen together as he leaves her at an airport. Marina tells him, "I want to keep your name".

The film's closing moments depict Father Quintana tending to the aged, the poor, and the imprisoned with a voice-over from the priest reciting a prayer that includes elements of the breastplate of St. Patrick ("Christ with me. Christ before me. Christ behind me...") as well as parts of a meditation by John Henry Newman. A few years later, Neil is seen with what looks like his family. Marina is shown walking in a rain-drenched, pastoral setting. In a state of ecstatic discovery, she turns to see a brilliant, golden light pass over her face. "The Wonder" – Mont Saint-Michel – remains rooted to the earth with its spire piercing the heavens.

== Cast ==
- Ben Affleck as Neil
- Olga Kurylenko as Marina
- Rachel McAdams as Jane
- Javier Bardem as Father Quintana
- Tatiana Chiline as Tatiana
- Charles Baker as Charles
- Romina Mondello as Anna
- Zach Merciez as Himself

== Production ==
=== Development ===
When announced in February 2010, the film was set to co-star Christian Bale. Bale ultimately dropped out of the production and was replaced by Ben Affleck; Rachel McAdams also joined the cast.

As with its predecessor, The Tree of Life, and its successor, Knight of Cups, the film's conception and plot stem from autobiographical elements: Terrence Malick met his second wife Michèle Morette in Paris in the early 1980s, and the couple lived in Oklahoma for a period prior to their separation.

=== Filming ===
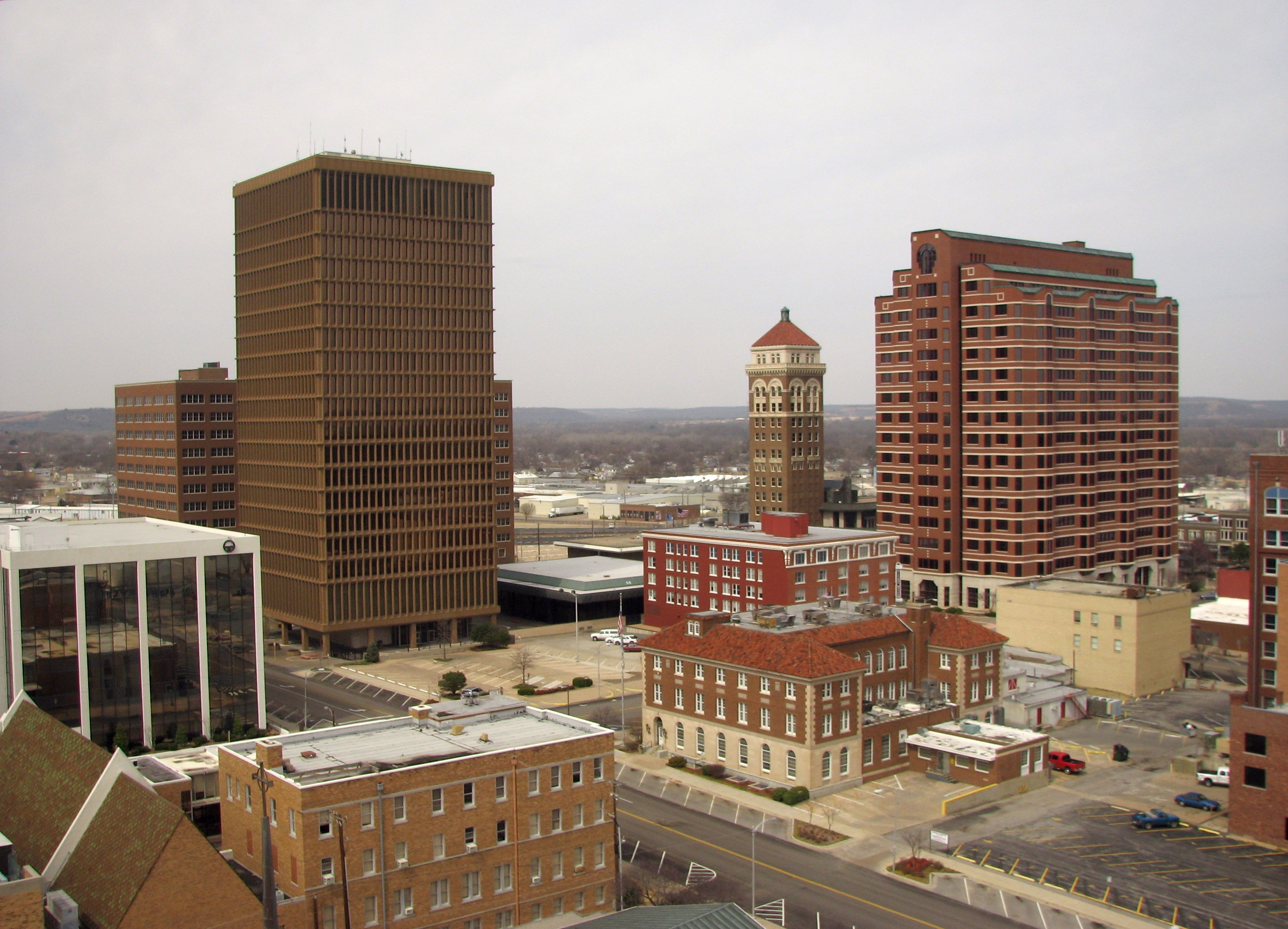
Much of To the Wonder was filmed in Bartlesville, Oklahoma

When the film entered production it did not have a title, and was referred to by the crew as Project D. Filming took place primarily in Bartlesville and Pawhuska, Oklahoma, the latter the center of the Osage Nation, and began in September 2010. Additional shooting took place in early 2011 in Bartlesville and Paris, France. Shots in France include scenes at Mont Saint-Michel, inside the Paris Métro and at La Défense.

Malick and his crew adopted an experimental approach. Actors described working without a screenplay or the use of lights. Olga Kurylenko described the shooting process as more like a dance performance than traditional acting, stating: “What he always said was, ‘Keep moving, keep moving. Don’t stop.’ If I ever stopped, he'd poke me to keep going.” Likewise, cinematographer on the film, Emmanuel Lubezki, was given instructions to be “in the eye of the hurricane” — in the middle of a scene, constantly interacting with the characters. Lubezki called the film "abstract", and described it as being less tied to theatrical conventions and more purely cinematic than any prior film directed by Malick.

=== Post-production ===
Malick handed out works of literature to his editing team for inspiration, such as Flaubert's Madame Bovary and Walker Percy's The Moviegoer. Also referenced to his editors was a phrase found in Margaret A. Doody's introduction to Samuel Richardson's 1740 novel Pamela. The phrase "radiant zigzag becoming", became an unofficial motto for the film's editing team during post-production. Also referenced during the editing of the film were the French New Wave films Jules and Jim by Truffaut (the score of which was used as part of a temp soundtrack) and Godard's Breathless, Pierrot le Fou, and Vivre Sa Vie. They were chosen for their elliptical narrative and editing styles which Malick hoped his editing team would embrace.

Typical of a Malick project, many actors who worked on the film were eventually cut during post-production. Jessica Chastain, Rachel Weisz, Amanda Peet, Barry Pepper and Michael Sheen were originally part of the film, but no footage of their performances was kept for the final cut.

== Release ==
After a world premiere on September 2, 2012, as an official selection of the 69th Venice Film Festival, the film screened at the 2012 Toronto International Film Festival. Shortly after, Magnolia Pictures acquired distribution rights to the film. The film was released in a limited release and through video on demand on April 12, 2013.

The film opened with $130,000 in select screens and was in the top ten iTunes rentals the week of its opening. It ended up with an approximate worldwide gross of $2,783,139.

== Reception ==
=== Critical response ===
The film received mixed reviews from critics. On review aggregator website Rotten Tomatoes, the film has a 47% approval rating based on 178 reviews, with an average rating of 6.1 out of 10. The site's consensus reads, "To the Wonder demonstrates Terrence Malick's gift for beautiful images, but its narrative is overly somber and emotionally unsatisfying." On Metacritic, the film has a weighted average score of 58 out of 100 based on 41 critics, indicating "mixed or average reviews".

To the Wonder was the final film reviewed by Roger Ebert prior to his death on April 4, 2013. His review was published two days later. He awarded it three and a half out of four stars, stating:

A more conventional film would have assigned a plot to these characters and made their motivations more clear. Malick, who is surely one of the most romantic and spiritual of filmmakers, appears almost naked here before his audience, a man not able to conceal the depth of his vision.

Several reviewers welcomed the religious themes of the film. Dawn LaValle, writing for First Things, summarizes: "To the Wonder startles us into realizing that the world is shot through, positively charged, with [divine] presence. Whether that presence is fructifying love or slinking destruction stands as an accusing question throughout the film." Likewise, the Jury which awarded To the Wonder the SIGNIS Award at the Venice Film Festival, said of the film: "The film’s rich composition, textured direction, and its use of light bring together elements of divinity and humanity ultimately creating a sacramental experience which reveals God’s gift of unconditional love."

=== Top ten lists ===
The film appeared on a few critics' top ten lists of the best films of 2013.

- 1st – Richard Brody, The New Yorker
- 1st – Reverse Shot
- 1st – Nick Pinkerton, Sundance Now
- 8th – Keith Uhlich, Time Out New York

=== Accolades ===
List of accolades
Award / Film festival	Category	Recipient(s)	Result
69th Venice Film Festival	Golden Lion	Terrence Malick	Nominated
69th Venice Film Festival	SIGNIS Award	Terrence Malick	Won

== See also ==
- Thy Kingdom Come, a 2018 short film and spinoff of To the Wonder
