= The Tree of Life (film) =

American epic experimental drama (2011)

- Theatrical release poster
- Directed by: Terrence Malick
- Written by: Terrence Malick
- Produced by: Sarah Green; Bill Pohlad; Brad Pitt; Dede Gardner; Grant Hill
- Starring: Brad Pitt; Sean Penn; Jessica Chastain
- Cinematography: Emmanuel Lubezki
- Edited by: Hank Corwin; Jay Rabinowitz; Daniel Rezende; Billy Weber; Mark Yoshikawa
- Music by: Alexandre Desplat
- Production companies: River Road Entertainment; Plan B Entertainment
- Distributed by: Fox Searchlight Pictures (United States, United Kingdom and Ireland); Summit Entertainment (International)
- Release dates: May 16, 2011 (Cannes); May 27, 2011 (United States)
- Running time: 138 minutes
- Country: United States
- Language: English
- Budget: $32 million
- Box office: $61 million

The Tree of Life is a 2011 American epic experimental coming-of-age drama film written and directed by Terrence Malick. Its main cast includes Brad Pitt, Sean Penn, Hunter McCracken, Laramie Eppler, Jessica Chastain, and Tye Sheridan in his debut feature film role. The film chronicles the origins and meaning of life by way of a middle-aged man's childhood memories of his family living in 1950s Texas, interspersed with imagery of the origins of the universe and the inception of life on Earth.

After more than five years in production, The Tree of Life premiered in competition at the 2011 Cannes Film Festival, where it won the Palme d'Or. It received three Oscar nominations: Best Picture, Best Director and Best Cinematography. It was ranked number one on review aggregator Metacritic's "Film Critic Top Ten List of 2011", and made more critics' year-end lists for 2011 than any other film. It has since been ranked by numerous publications as one of the greatest films of the 2010s, of the 21st century, and of all time.

== Plot ==
=== Premise ===
The film follows the members of the O'Brien family in the 1940s–1960s and 2010. Most of the film takes place in the 1950s, but the film jumps between different narratives. The O'Briens appear to be a standard American middle-class suburban family. Mr. O'Brien is a successful engineer for an energy company, but has enough free time to indulge his love of music. Mrs. O'Brien is a housewife with many friends in the neighborhood. They have three healthy boys, Jack, R.L., and Stevie. However, the film reveals deep cracks behind the facade, which leave Jack traumatized for decades.

=== Theatrical edition ===
"Where were you when I laid the foundations of the Earth? ... When the morning stars sang together, and all the sons of God shouted for joy?"

— The film begins with a quote from the Book of Job 38:4–7, while a mysterious light flickers in the darkness.

In the 1960s, Mr. and Mrs. O'Brien are devastated to learn that their 19-year-old son R.L. has died. In 2010, their eldest son Jack is an architect in an unnamed city, (Note: The name of the city is not stated, but Malick's official first draft of the script states that Jack lives in the "City of Destruction," which is described as "a modern city: it could be Chicago, New York, Houston, Paris, Mumbai, Los Angeles, or a composite of them all." Scenes were shot in Houston and Dallas.) leading a seemingly empty existence and has a difficult relationship with his father, who still has not gotten over R.L.'s death. Mrs. O'Brien asks God why R.L. had to die. Then a series of dreamlike images depict the birth of the universe, the creation of Earth and the beginning of life. At one point a dinosaur spares another, badly wounded, dinosaur. Finally, an asteroid strikes Earth.

In the 1940s, Mr. and Mrs. O'Brien start a family in the Waco, Texas, suburbs with three sons: Jack, R.L., and Stevie. They have very different personalities, which Mrs. O'Brien calls the way of nature and grace. Jack sees his mother as the embodiment of grace: kind, forgiving, and nurturing, presenting the world to her sons as a place of wonder. His father is seen as the embodiment of nature: hot-tempered, tough, and stern, teaching his sons to fight in an unjust world and not trust people easily.

As a teenager, Jack learns that his parents are frustrated with their lives. Mr. O'Brien finds his career unfulfilling, as his true passion is music. He spends his free time inventing gadgets and hopes to start his own business, but sees no progress especially after losing a patent lawsuit. He is domineering towards Mrs. O'Brien, berating her for not disciplining the boys enough, worrying that her kindness has caused them to hate him. Jack lambasts his mother for failing to stand up to him.

Jack also begins to question the goodness of God after the death of his friend Taylor. He resents his father, who harshly disciplines him but softens with R.L. due to their shared love of music. When Mr. O'Brien goes on a business trip, the boys are able to play freely with their mother, but it also facilitated Jack's rebelliousness. Peer-pressured, he commits vandalism and animal abuse. In an episode of sexual curiosity, he enters a neighbor's house and touches a nightgown, which he throws out of shame. He also experiences guilt after hurting R.L.'s finger with a BB gun; they eventually reconcile.

Mr. O'Brien's plant shuts down, forcing the family to relocate. Before leaving the house, he reflects on his pride and wrath, asking Jack to forgive him for his harshness, and tries to conciliate Jack by telling him that he takes after his mother. However, Jack insists that he better resembles his father.

Back to 2010, Jack has a vision of himself, accompanied by a young girl and his teenage self, walking across desolate terrain. He walks through a wooden door frame and envisions the Sun expanding into a red giant, engulfing Earth before shrinking into a white dwarf. At a seaside, he is reunited with his family and all who populate his memory. Jack meets his brothers and brings R.L. to his parents, who embrace him. Jack also reconciles with his father. Accompanied by two girls, Mrs. O'Brien surrenders R.L. to God.

Jack's vision ends and he leaves his office, smiling contentedly. The mysterious light continues flickering in the darkness.

=== Extended edition ===
Malick released an extended version of the film in September 2018, which incorporates unused footage from the original film shoot. Although Malick maintains that the theatrical edition is the official director's cut, the extended version expands on the character of Mr. O'Brien and broadly questions Mrs. O'Brien's either-or distinction between nature and grace.

Additional plot elements include:

- In the present day, the film fills in details of Jack's life as he wanders around Dallas. Although he cheats on his wife, he tries to look after his teenage son.
- Mrs. O'Brien once aspired to be a scientist, but gave it up to be a housewife.
- Mr. O'Brien is haunted by his memories of his own father, a Navy veteran who was unsuccessful in civilian life. Terrified of ending up like his father, he pushes himself to make it big in business.
- Mr. O'Brien spends more time playing with his sons and teaching them to love music like he does.
- Mrs. O'Brien's brother Ray visits the family. Although Ray, like Mr. O'Brien, has a masculine demeanor, he does not fit into the "way of nature" paradigm, and harshly criticizes Mr. O'Brien for mistreating his nephews. Mr. O'Brien is jealous of how much his sons like Ray, and criticizes Ray for his unsuccessful career.
- Jack visits a friend's house and sees that the O'Briens are not the only family in Waco with domestic tensions.
- Jack's increasing rebelliousness leads him to become an inattentive student. As Jack declines academically, Mr. O'Brien realizes his own deficiencies as a father. To give Jack another chance in a better environment, he sends Jack to boarding school. One of the final scenes shows Jack exploring the campus of Malick's alma mater, St. Stephen's Episcopal School in Austin.

== Cast ==
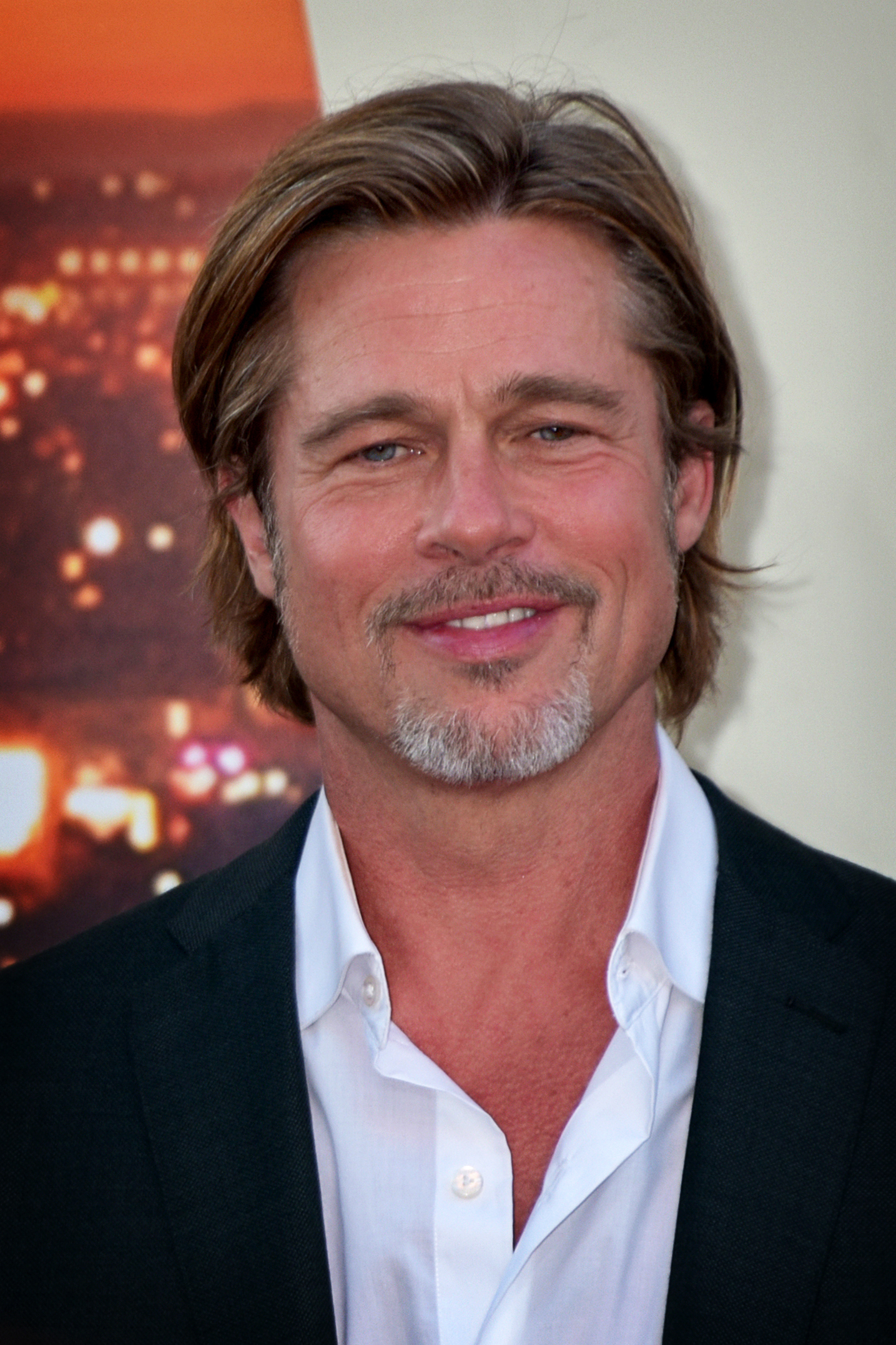
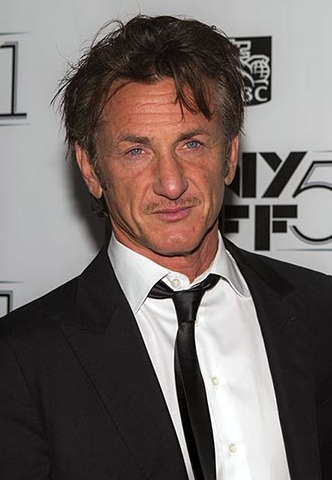
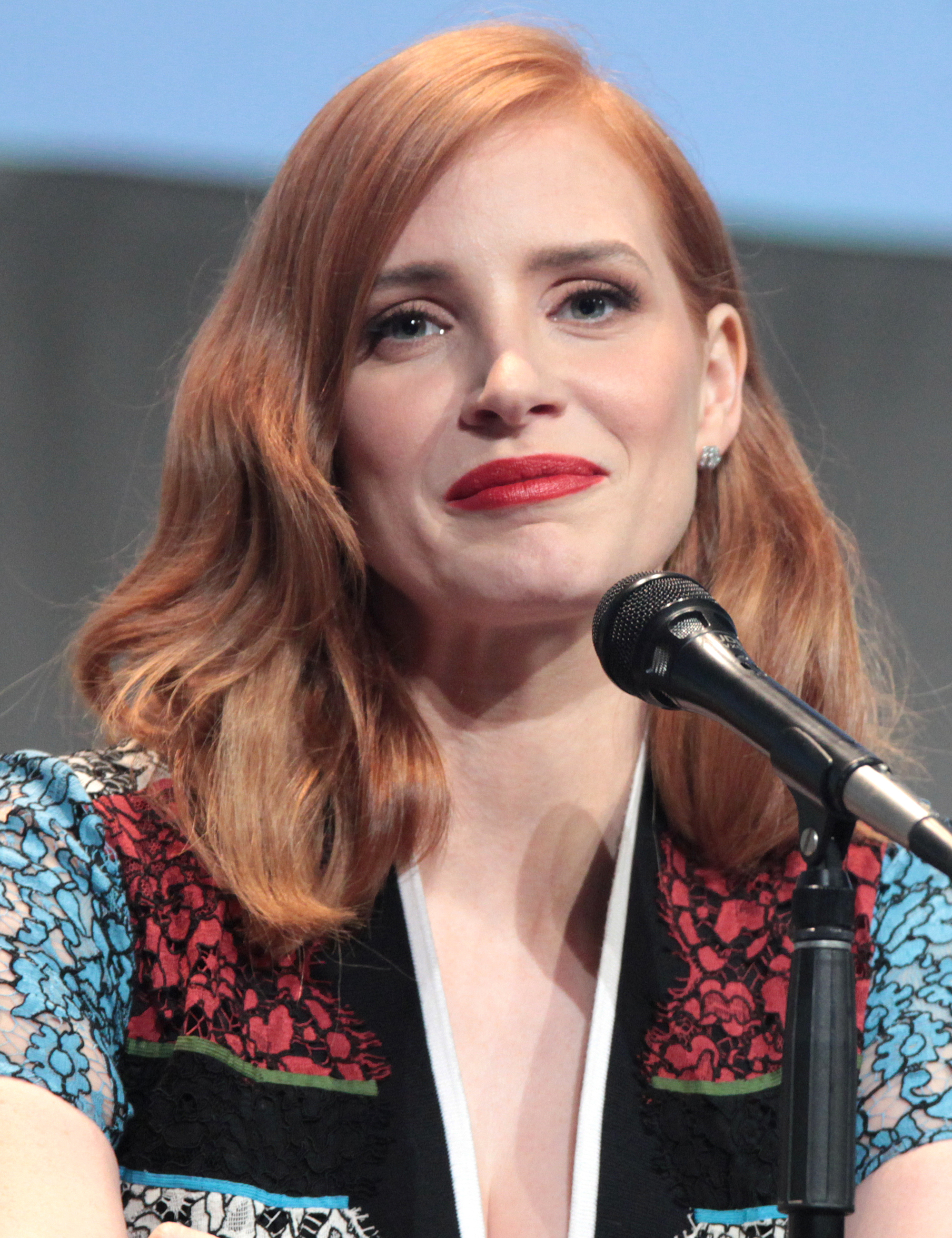
The film stars Brad Pitt, Sean Penn, and Jessica Chastain.
- Brad Pitt as Mr. O'Brien
- Jessica Chastain as Mrs. O'Brien
- Sean Penn as Jack O'Brien
  - Hunter McCracken as young Jack
  - Finnegan Williams as Jack (age 5)
  - Michael Koeth as Jack (age 2)
- Laramie Eppler as R.L. O'Brien
  - John Howell as R.L. (age 2)
- Tye Sheridan as Steve O'Brien
- Kari Matchett as Jack's ex
- Joanna Going as Jack's wife
- Michael Showers as Mr. Brown
- Kimberly Whalen as Mrs. Brown
- Jackson Hurst as Uncle Ray
- Fiona Shaw as Grandmother
- Crystal Mantecón as Elisa
- Tamara Jolaine as Mrs. Stone
- Dustin Allen as George Walsh
- Tommy Hollis as Tommy

== Production ==
=== Development ===
Following the critical success of Days of Heaven (1978), Terrence Malick was offered $1 million for his next project, Q. Malick's idea for Q was "a history of the cosmos up through the formation of the Earth and the beginnings of life." Although several ideas from Q formed the core of The Tree of Life, several other Q ideas were scrapped, such as a section set in the Middle East during World War I, and an underwater minotaur dreaming about the evolution of the universe. Although Malick and his crew scouted locations and filmed certain nature shots for the film, he did not set a formal schedule or write a script. Reportedly, he was unsure whether the film should focus on humanity, nature, or both; at one point, the creative team considered introducing humans only at the end of the film. One day, Malick "just stopped" working on the film.

Decades later, Malick pitched the concept of The Tree of Life to River Road Entertainment head Bill Pohlad while the two were collaborating on an early version of Che. Pohlad recalled initially thinking the idea was "crazy", but as the film concept evolved, he came to feel strongly about the idea; he ended up financing the film. Producer Grant Hill was also involved with the film at an early stage. During a meeting on a different subject involving Malick, his producer Sarah Green, Brad Pitt, and Pitt's Plan B Entertainment production partner Dede Gardner, Malick brought up Tree of Life and the difficulties it was having getting made. It was "much later on" that the decision was made for Pitt to be part of the cast.

The Tree of Life was announced in late 2005, with Indian production company Percept Picture Company set to finance it and Donald Rosenfeld on board as executive producer. The film was set to be shot partially in India, with pre-production scheduled to begin in January 2006. Colin Farrell and Mel Gibson were at one stage attached to the project. Heath Ledger was set to play the role of Mr. O'Brien, but dropped out (due to recurring sicknesses) a month before his death in early 2008.

For the roles of the three brothers, the production team spent over a year, seeing over 10,000 Texas students for the roles. About 95% of the entire cast had no prior acting experience.

In an October 2008 interview, Jack Fisk, a longtime Malick collaborator, suggested that the director was attempting something radical. He also implied that details of the film were a close secret. In March 2009, visual effects artist Mike Fink revealed to Empire magazine that he was working on scenes of prehistoric Earth for the film. The similarity of the scenes Fink describes to descriptions of a hugely ambiguous project entitled Q that Malick worked on soon after Days of Heaven led to speculation that The Tree of Life was a resurrection of that abandoned project.

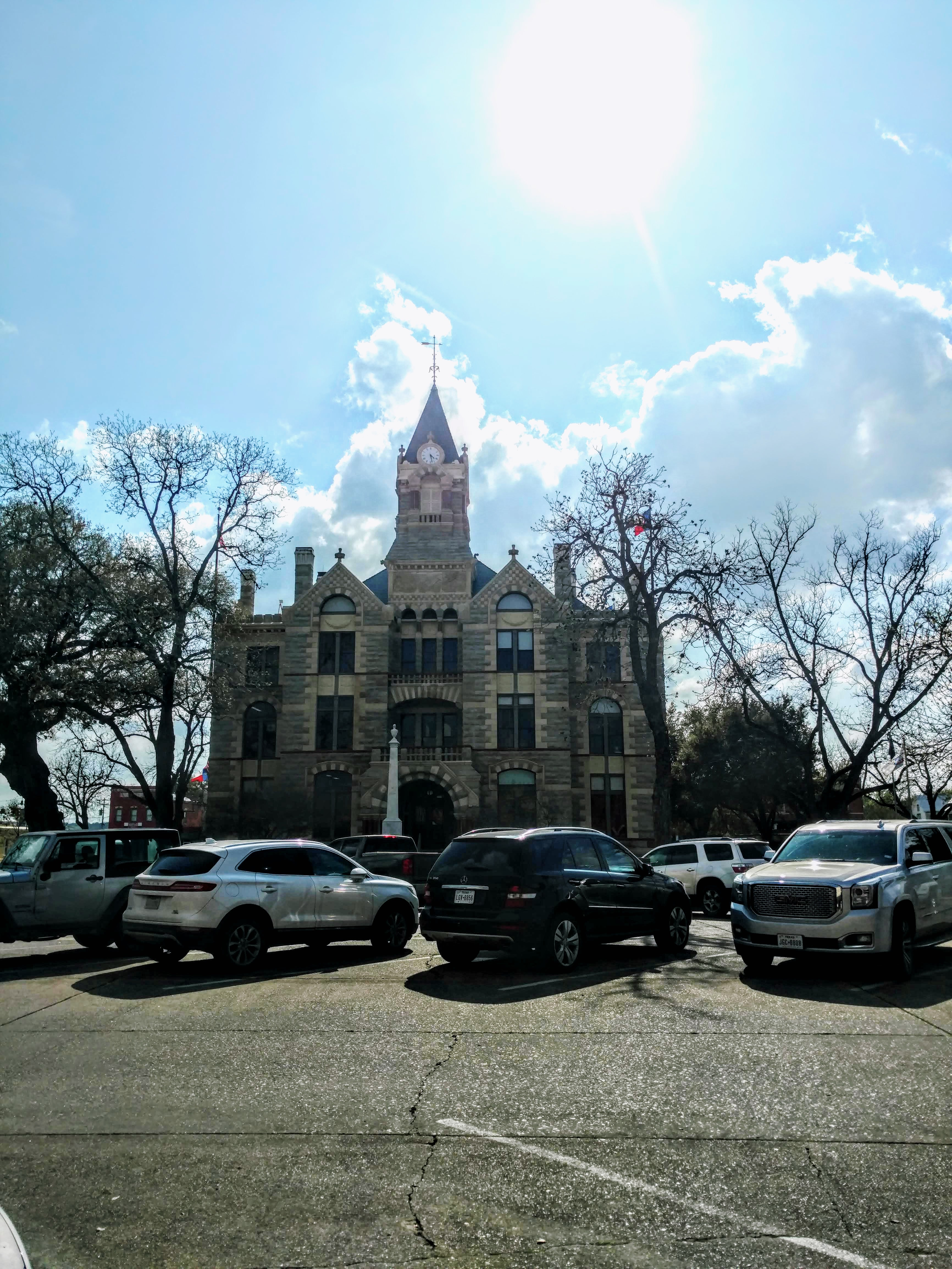
The Fayette County Courthouse and local square, located 20 miles outside of Smithville in La Grange, TX, appears in the film as the O'Brien boys witness an arrest.

=== Filming ===
Principal photography began in Texas in 2008. Cinematographer Emmanuel Lubezki returned to work with Malick after collaborating with him on The New World. The film was shot in 1.85:1 and often used natural light. The film used 35mm, 65mm, and IMAX formats. Locations included Smithville, Houston, Matagorda, Bastrop, Austin, Dallas, and Malick's hometown of Waco.

The eponym of the film is a large live oak tree that was excavated from a property five miles outside Smithville. The 65,000-pound tree and root ball were trucked into Smithville and replanted.

The sets for The Tree of Life were unusual for a large scale film. According to Brad Pitt, "A movie set is very chaotic. There [are] hundreds of people; there [are] generators and trucks. And this was a completely different experience — we had none of that." "There were no [camera] lights ... there were no generators and the camera was all hand-held so it was a very free-form, low-key experience." Adding to the improvisational aspect, Malick would change different aspects of a scene between takes in order to create "moments of truth".

According to Richard Brody, Malick and Lubezki built upon the "new visual style" they developed for The New World, "based on a camera moving ... in the direction of the view through the lens, plunging into the action and 'taking the audience forward and into the world, probing, peering, inquiring, exploring with a restless, intrusive eye.'" Brody concluded that The Tree of Life's filming style "reflect[s] frustration with the fundamental similarity of most commercially released movies as pictures of actors acting, as a variety of filmed theatre ... by means of the roving, floating, surging camera, Malick ... repudiate[s] the very notion of the fixed frame and [] open[s[ the screen to the world at large."

=== Editing ===
Lubezki estimated that he shot 600,000 meters of film (i.e., over 350 hours of footage). He revealed to Cahiers du Cinéma that the first cut of the film was 8 hours long.

Similar to many of Malick's films, the film had "teams of editors to put together different cuts, and finding and discarding entire story lines during the post-production process." Malick used "unorthodox methods to edit the film". One of the film's editors, Billy Weber said "Terry is willing to try anything. Absolutely anything. Sometimes we'd cut a character out of a scene, or cut all the dialogue out of a scene, just to see if it worked. And when you've worked with him for any length of time, you can even try that without asking him about it first. He's very open to looking at anything that you try." This includes allowing film students from USC and University of Texas, as well as interns, to play a part in the editing process. Some of them stayed on the film the whole time.

=== Visual effects ===
After nearly thirty years away from Hollywood, famed special effects supervisor Douglas Trumbull contributed to the visual effects work on The Tree of Life. Malick, a friend of Trumbull, approached him about the effects work and mentioned that he did not like the look of computer-generated imagery. Trumbull asked Malick, "Why not do it the old way? The way we did it in 2001?"

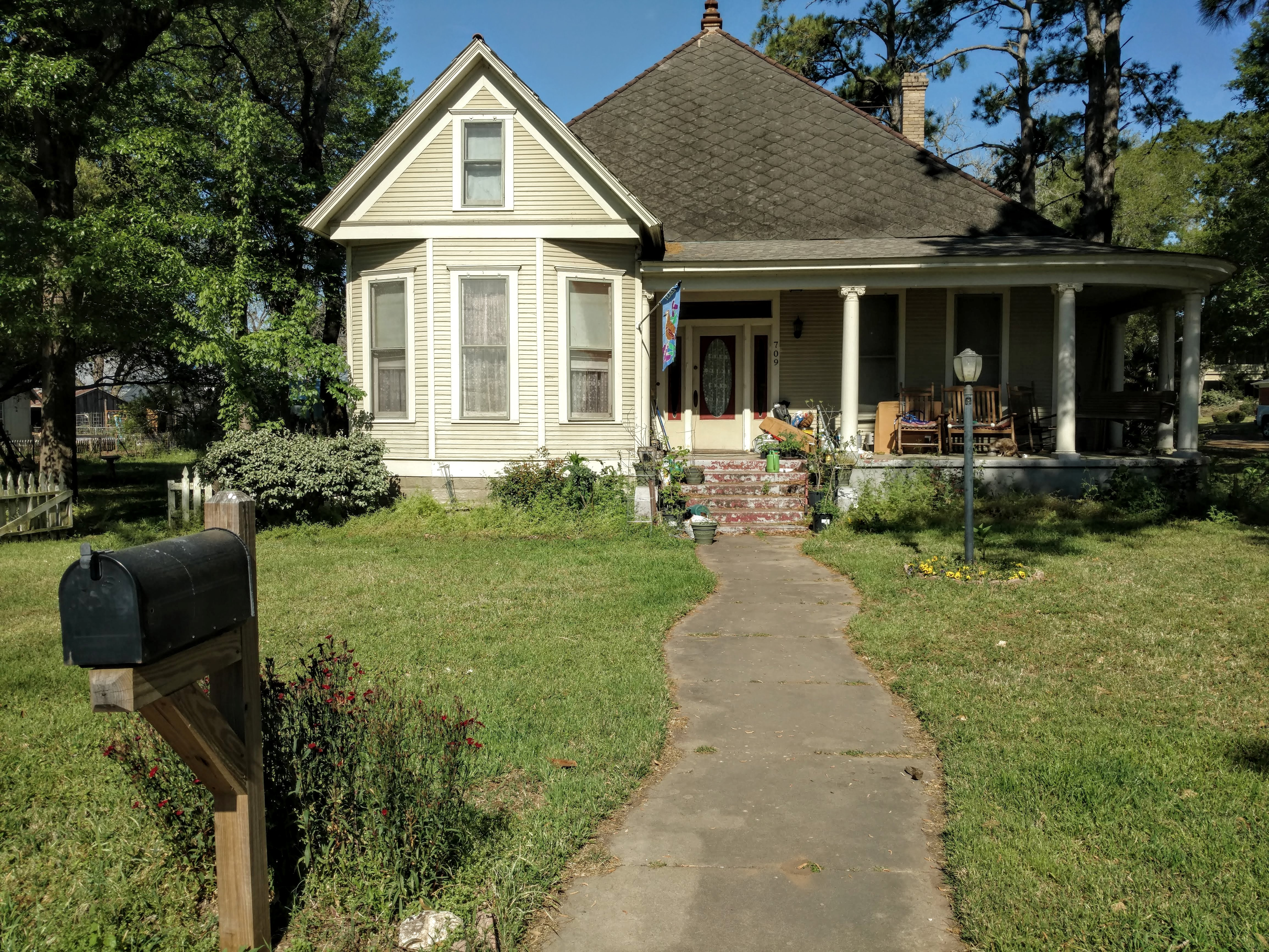
The home of the fictional O'Brien family is located in Smithville, Texas.

Working with visual effects supervisor Dan Glass, Trumbull used a variety of materials for the creation of the universe sequence. "We worked with chemicals, paint, fluorescent dyes, smoke, liquids, CO_{2}, flares, spin dishes, fluid dynamics, lighting and high speed photography to see how effective they might be," said Trumbull. "It was a free-wheeling opportunity to explore, something that I have found extraordinarily hard to get in the movie business. Terry didn't have any preconceived ideas of what something should look like. We did things like pour milk through a funnel into a narrow trough and shoot it with a high-speed camera and folded lens, lighting it carefully and using a frame rate that would give the right kind of flow characteristics to look cosmic, galactic, huge and epic." The team also included Double Negative in London. Fluid-based effects were developed by Peter and Chris Parks, who had previously worked on similar effects for The Fountain.

A column in The New Yorker noted that the film credited Thomas Wilfred's lumia composition Opus 161, and that this was the source of the "shifting flame of red-yellow light" at the beginning and the end.

=== Music and soundtrack ===
Alexandre Desplat composed the score for the film. Lakeshore Records released his score in 2011 as The Tree of Life Original Motion Picture Soundtrack.

In addition to Desplat's score, the film features selections and snippets from more than 30 individual pieces—including works by Brahms, Mahler, Bach, Couperin, Górecki and Holst. Notable songs that appear in the film include Zbigniew Preisner's Lacrimosa from Requiem for My Friend, which plays over the birth of the universe sequence. François Couperin's Les Barricades Mystérieuses features twice: an in-universe duet played by Mr. O'Brien and R.L., and a recorded piano version by Angela Hewitt that plays over scenes of Mrs. O'Brien playing with her sons.

== Themes ==
=== Philosophical ===
Many reviewers have noted the philosophical and theological themes of the film. Catholic author and now bishop of the Diocese of Winona–Rochester Fr. Robert Barron, reviewing The Tree of Life for a Chicago Tribune blog, noted that "in the play of good and evil, in the tension between nature and grace, God is up to something beautiful, though we are unable to grasp it totally...Tree of Life is communicating this same difficult but vital lesson." The Catholic magazine America called the film "a philosophical exploration of grief, theodicy and the duality of grace and human nature". They described the final beach scene as "the greatest film depiction of eschatological bodily resurrection".

Rabbi David Wolpe said "that Terrence Malick's new film Tree of Life opens with a quotation from Job. That quotation holds the key to the film and in some sense, the key to our attitude toward life." He added that "The agony of the parents, the periodic cruelty of the father — all are the powerful but passing dramas that for the moment entirely preoccupy us as we watch the movie. But then we are drawn back to a world so much bigger than our hour upon the stage that we know again how essentially small is each human story."

According to Bob Mondello, the film is showing that "to understand the death of a young man, we need to understand everything that led to his creation, starting with creation itself."

Kristen Scharold compared the film to Augustine's Confessions, and noted how one voiceover is nearly identical to a quote from Fyodor Dostoevsky's The Brothers Karamazov.

=== Nature and grace ===
Many have said that Mr. O'Brien represents the way of nature, while Mrs. O'Brien represents the way of grace.

Brad Pitt said Mr. O'Brien "represents nature — but nature as that oppressive force that will choke another plant out for its own survival." "The American dream didn't work out as he believed it would. [He's] quite envious and bitter that people are ahead of him. Naturally, when someone feels oppressed, they find someone weaker to pass that oppression on[to], and the sadness in this situation [is] it's on his sons."

=== Autobiographical ===
Many reviewers have noted the similarities between Jack's life and Terrence Malick's life. Jim Lynch, a close friend of Malick, told Malick that he thought The Tree of Life, Knight of Cups, and Song to Song formed an "autobiographical trilogy". Lynch said Malick disliked the labeling and "didn't want people thinking that he was just making movies about himself. He was making movies about broader issues."

== Release ==
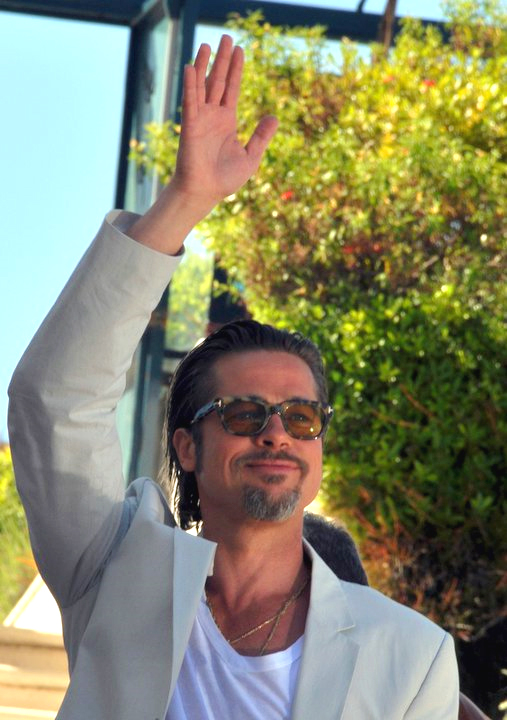
Brad Pitt promoting the film at the 2011 Cannes Film Festival.

In March 2009, Empire magazine's website quoted visual effects supervisor Mike Fink as saying that a version of the film will be released for IMAX cinemas along with two versions for traditional cinemas. The IMAX film has been revealed to be Voyage of Time, a documentary expanding on the "history of the universe" scenes in The Tree of Life, which the producers decided to focus on releasing at a later date so as not to cannibalize its release. It was released in IMAX in the United States on October 7, 2016 by Broad Green Pictures.

=== Delays and distribution problems ===
By May 2009, The Tree of Life had been sold to a number of international distributors, including EuropaCorp. Distribution in France, Concorde Filmverleih in Germany and Austria, 01 Distribution in Italy, Tripictures in Spain, Icon Film Distribution in the United Kingdom, Ireland, Australia and New Zealand, as well as Belga Films in Benelux and Svensk Filmindustri in Scandinavia. In August 2009, it was announced that the film would be released in the US through Apparition, a new distributor founded by River Road Entertainment head Bill Pohlad and former Picturehouse chief Bob Berney. A tentative date of December 25, 2009 was announced, but the film was not completed in time. Organisers of the Cannes Film Festival made negotiations to secure a premiere at Cannes 2010, resulting in Malick sending an early version of the film to Thierry Fremaux and the Cannes selection committee. Though Fremaux warmly received the cut and was eager to screen the film at his festival, Malick ultimately told him that he felt the film was not ready. On the eve of the 2010 Cannes Film Festival, Berney suddenly announced his departure from Apparition, leaving the company's future uncertain. Pohlad decided to keep The Tree of Life at Apparition, and after significant restructuring, hired Tom Ortenberg to act as a consultant on its release. A tentative plan was made to release it in late 2010, in time for awards consideration. Ultimately, Pohlad decided to close Apparition and sell rights to the film. Private screenings of the film to interested parties Fox Searchlight Pictures and Sony Pictures Classics took place at the 2010 Telluride Film Festival. On September 9, Fox Searchlight announced their acquisition of the film from Pohlad's River Road Entertainment. The film opened in limited release in the United States on May 27, 2011.

On March 28, 2011, UK magazine Empire reported that Icon Film Distribution was planning to release the film in the United Kingdom and Ireland on May 4, 2011. This would make the UK the first region in the world to see the film, preempting the expected Cannes Film Festival premiere on May 11. This would disqualify the film from inclusion at Cannes. As a result, a surge of interest in the story developed on international film news sites. After film blogger Jeff Wells was told by a Fox Searchlight representative that this was "unlikely", and Anne Thompson received similar word from Searchlight and outright denial from Summit, Helen O'Hara from Empire received a confirmation from Icon that they intended to stick with the May 4 release. On March 31, Jeff Wells was told by Jill Jones, Summit's senior VP of international marketing and publicity, that Icon has lost the right to distribute The Tree of Life in the UK, due to defaulting on its agreement, with the matter pending arbitration at a tribunal in Los Angeles. On June 9, it was announced that The Tree of Life would be released in the UK on July 8, 2011, after Fox Searchlight picked up rights from Icon, which retained Australian and New Zealand distribution rights.

=== Home media ===
The Tree of Life was released on Blu-ray Disc in the United States and Canada on October 11, 2011; on January 24, 2012, there was a separate release of the DVD.

During the Cannes Film Festival in 2011, Peter Becker, president of the home media company The Criterion Collection, and Fox Searchlight discussed a potential Criterion home video release that would include a longer alternate version of The Tree of Life which Malick would like to create. In an unprecedented move, Criterion decided to finance the alternate version for its eventual inclusion on both Blu-ray and DVD. In creating the alternate version, the original negatives' palettes were located for Malick to use, the entire film scanned in 4K resolution, cinematographer Emmanuel Lubezki brought in to help grade the footage, and a full sound mix created for the additional material, with Malick even dedicating "the better part of a year" to this project. Becker stated that the company has "never undertaken anything this extensive or this challenging, or anything that has taken this long to achieve or required so much effort on the part of pretty much every post-production craft. The only thing we didn't do is go shoot new material".

Malick was careful to note that the extended cut of the film is an alternative version, not the definitive one. In an interview with Indiewire, Criterion technical director Lee Kline said:

Unlike with [The New World], [the version of The Tree of Life] that premiered in 2011 at Cannes [was] definitely the definitive version of the film he wanted to make. What's interesting talking to Terry about this [new version of Tree of Life], I think he still doesn't want people to think this is a better version. This is another version.

The extended version runs to 188 minutes; in addition to entirely new footage with new characters and scenes, it also extends existing scenes and features minor changes to the film's score, musical arrangements, and color grading. After premiering at the 75th Venice International Film Festival on September 7, 2018, the extended cut was released on September 11, along with a new 4K digital restoration of the original version. Both editions also include the film's trailer, the making-of documentary Exploring "The Tree of Life", a 2011 interview with composer Alexandre Desplat, new interviews with actress Jessica Chastain, visual-effects supervisor Dan Glass, and music critic Alex Ross, and a 2011 video essay by Matt Zoller Seitz, as well as a booklet containing essays by film critics Kent Jones and Roger Ebert. The cover used for both editions is designed by Neil Kellerhouse.

== Reception ==
=== Critical response ===
Early reviews for The Tree of Life were polarized. After being met with both boos and applause at its premiere at the 2011 Cannes Film Festival, the film received mixed early reviews. It went on to be awarded the Palme d'Or. Two of its producers, Bill Pohlad and Sarah Green, accepted the prize on behalf of the reclusive Malick. The Tree of Life was the first American film to win the Palme d'Or since Fahrenheit 9/11 in 2004. The head of the jury, Robert De Niro, said it was difficult to choose a winner, but The Tree of Life "ultimately fit the bill". De Niro explained, "It had the size, the importance, the intention, whatever you want to call it, that seemed to fit the prize."

The Tree of Life has since garnered critical acclaim and scholarly interest. On Rotten Tomatoes, 86% of critics have given the film a positive review based on 292 reviews. The site's critics consensus reads: "Terrence Malick's singularly deliberate style may prove unrewarding for some, but for patient viewers, Tree of Life is an emotional as well as visual treat." On Metacritic, which assigns a weighted mean rating out of 100 reviews from film critics, the film has a rating score of 85 out of 100 based on 50 reviews, indicating "universal acclaim".

Roger Ebert gave the film four stars of four and wrote:

The Tree of Life is a film of vast ambition and deep humility, attempting no less than to encompass all of existence and view it through the prism of a few infinitesimal lives. The only other film I've seen with this boldness of vision is Kubrick's 2001: A Space Odyssey and it lacked Malick's fierce evocation of human feeling. There were once several directors who yearned to make no less than a masterpiece, but now there are only a few. Malick has stayed true to that hope ever since his first feature in 1973.

The following year, Ebert gave The Tree of Life one of his ten votes in Sight & Sound's 2012 critics' poll of the world's greatest films. Anthony Lane of The New Yorker said that a "seraphic strain" in Malick's work "hits a solipsistic high" in The Tree of Life. "While the result will sound to some like a prayer, others may find it increasingly lonely and locked, and may themselves pray for Ben Hecht or Billy Wilder to rise from the dead and attack Malick's script with a quiver of poisonous wisecracks."

Peter Bradshaw of The Guardian awarded it five stars and lauded it as an "unashamedly epic reflection on love and loss" and a "mad and magnificent film". Todd McCarthy of The Hollywood Reporter stated: "Brandishing an ambition it's likely no film, including this one, could entirely fulfill, The Tree of Life is nonetheless a singular work, an impressionistic metaphysical inquiry into mankind's place in the grand scheme of things that releases waves of insights amidst its narrative imprecisions." Justin Chang of Variety stated that the film "represents something extraordinary" and "is in many ways his simplest yet most challenging work, a transfixing odyssey through time and memory that melds a young boy's 1950s upbringing with a magisterial rumination on the Earth's origins." Peter Travers of Rolling Stone stated: "Shot with a poet's eye, Malick's film is a groundbreaker, a personal vision that dares to reach for the stars." A. O. Scott of The New York Times gave the film much praise, stating: "The sheer beauty of this film is almost overwhelming, but as with other works of religiously minded art, its aesthetic glories are tethered to a humble and exalted purpose, which is to shine the light of the sacred on secular reality". Total Film gave the film a five-star review (denoting 'outstanding'): "The Tree of Life is beautiful. Ridiculously, rapturously beautiful. You could press 'pause' at any second and hang the frame on your wall." Richard Corliss of Time named it one of the Top 10 Best Movies of 2011.

Some religious reviewers welcomed the spiritual themes of the film. For instance, Catholic author and auxiliary bishop of Los Angeles Fr. Robert Barron, reviewing The Tree of Life for a Chicago Tribune blog, noted that "in the play of good and evil, in the tension between nature and grace, God is up to something beautiful, though we are unable to grasp it totally...Tree of Life is communicating this same difficult but vital lesson." Rabbi David Wolpe said "that Terrence Malick's new film Tree of Life opens with a quotation from Job. That quotation holds the key to the film and in some sense, the key to our attitude toward life."

Not all reviews were positive. Sukhdev Sandhu, chief film critic of The Daily Telegraph, described the movie as "self-absorbed", and "achingly slow, almost buckling under the weight of its swoony poetry." Likewise, Stephanie Zacharek of Movieline praised the technical aspects of the film, such as the "gorgeous photography", but nonetheless criticized it as "a gargantuan work of pretension and cleverly concealed self-absorption." Lee Marshall of Screen Daily referred to the film as "a cinematic credo about spiritual transcendence which, while often shot through with poetic yearning, preaches too directly to its audience." Filmmaker David Lynch said that, while he admired Malick's works, The Tree of Life "was not his cup of tea". In 2016, John Patterson of The Guardian complained of the meager impression that the film left on him, opining that "much of it simply evaporates before your eyes."

Sean Penn has said: "The screenplay is the most magnificent one that I've ever read but I couldn't find that same emotion on screen. ... A clearer and more conventional narrative would have helped the film without, in my opinion, lessening its beauty and its impact." He further clarified his reservations about the film by adding: "But it's a film I recommend, as long as you go in without any preconceived ideas. It's up to each person to find their own personal, emotional or spiritual connection to it. Those that do generally emerge very moved."

Filmmakers Christopher Nolan, David Fincher, Joachim Trier, and David Lowery have cited the film as one of their personal favorites of all time.

=== Top ten lists ===
The film appeared on over 70 critics' year-end top ten lists, including 15 first-place rankings. The Tree of Life was voted best film of 2011 in the annual Sight & Sound critic poll, earning one and a half times as many votes as runner up A Separation. The film also topped the critics poll of best released film of 2011 by Film Comment, and the IndieWire annual critics survey for 2011, as well as The Village Voice/LA Weekly Film Poll 2011. In France, Cahiers du cinéma placed it second on its 2011 top ten list, tying with The Strange Case of Angelica. Keith Uhlich of Time Out New York named The Tree of Life the third-best film of 2011, writing that "it may be the best thing [Malick's] ever done."

=== Accolades ===
The film won the Palme d'Or at the 2011 Cannes Film Festival. The film was nominated for Academy Award for Best Picture, Academy Award for Best Director, and Academy Award for Best Cinematography at the 84th Academy Awards.

The film won the 2011 FIPRESCI (International Federation of Film Critics) Big Prize for the Best Film Of the Year. The award was presented on September 16, during the opening ceremony of the 59th San Sebastián International Film Festival. Malick released a statement of thanks for the award. On November 28, it was announced that the film had won the Gotham Award for Best Feature, shared with Beginners.

== Legacy ==
In 2015, Bradshaw named the film one of the top 50 films of the decade so far by The Guardian. The Tree of Life ranked 79th on the British Broadcasting Corporation (BBC)'s 100 Greatest American Films in 2015, as well as seventh in the 100 Greatest Films of the 21st Century in August 2016. The latter list was compiled by polling 177 film critics from around the world.

In 2019, The Guardian ranked The Tree of Life 28th in its 100 best films of the 21st century list. In December 2019, The Tree of Life topped The Associated Press' list of the best films of the 2010s. In March 2020, America magazine put the film on its The Top 25 Films from the Last 25 Years. The February 2020 issue of New York Magazine lists The Tree of Life as among "The Best Movies That Lost Best Picture at the Oscars."

In 2022, the film was ranked #196 in the Sight and Sound Greatest Films of All Time poll.

In June 2025, it ranked number 79 on The New York Times' list of "The 100 Best Movies of the 21st Century" and number 71 on the "Readers' Choice" edition of the list.

In July 2025, it ranked number 58 on Rolling Stone's list of "The 100 Best Movies of the 21st Century."

== See also ==
- List of films featuring dinosaurs
