= Knight of Cups (film) =

2015 film by Terrence Malick

- Theatrical release poster
- Directed by: Terrence Malick
- Written by: Terrence Malick
- Produced by: Nicolas Gonda; Sarah Green; Ken Kao
- Starring: Christian Bale; Cate Blanchett; Natalie Portman
- Cinematography: Emmanuel Lubezki
- Edited by: A. J. Edwards; Keith Fraase; Geoffrey Richman; Mark Yoshikawa
- Music by: Hanan Townshend
- Production companies: Dogwood Films; FilmNation Entertainment; Waypoint Entertainment
- Distributed by: Broad Green Pictures
- Release dates: February 8, 2015 (Berlin); March 4, 2016 (United States)
- Running time: 118 minutes
- Country: United States
- Languages: English; Spanish; German; Serbian
- Box office: $1.1 million

Knight of Cups is a 2015 American romantic drama film written and directed by Terrence Malick. Starring Christian Bale, Cate Blanchett, and Natalie Portman, the film follows Rick (Bale), a hedonistic screenwriter who goes on an odyssey through Los Angeles and Las Vegas as he undertakes a series of adventures with several people, including his ex-wife Nancy (Blanchett) and his married lover Elizabeth (Portman).

The film is loosely inspired by, and at times quotes directly from, the 1678 Christian allegory The Pilgrim's Progress, the Acts of Thomas passage "Hymn of the Pearl", and Suhrawardi's A Tale of the Western Exile. Each of the characters is identified by a tarot card from the Major Arcana, with Bale representing the Knight of Cups.

Knight of Cups premiered at the 65th Berlin International Film Festival on February 8, 2015, where it was nominated for the Golden Bear. The film was theatrically released in the United States on March 4, 2016, to mixed reviews from critics, with several finding the narrative structure incoherent, while others praised the visual style.

== Plot ==
The film is divided into ten chapters (most of which are named after a tarot card from the Major Arcana or Minor Arcana except the final chapter, "Freedom"), each loosely focusing on one of the film's characters:

I. Knight of Cups – The opening title card serves as the initial "significator" card which represents the person being given the tarot reading (the querent). Audience is introduced to Rick, an aimless Hollywood screenwriter distracted by women and life's pleasures.

II. The Moon – Della, a rebellious young woman.

III. The Hanged Man – His unstable brother Barry and elderly father Joseph, with both of whom he commiserates about the loss of his brother Billy.

IV. The Hermit – Tonio, a wealthy libertine.

V. Judgment – His former wife Nancy, a physician.

VI. The Tower – Herb, a powerful executive who tries to persuade Rick to take a higher position in the movie business.

VII. The Sun – Helen, a serene but reserved and reflective model. (This is the only known chapter introduced not by an ordinary title card, but by a shot of the tarot card itself. Editor Keith Fraase has confirmed this shot was a chapter marker.)

VIII. The High Priestess – Karen, a free-spirited, playful stripper who accompanies Rick on an excursion to Las Vegas.

IX. Death – Elizabeth, a married woman with whom he has a romance and who then miscarries a child that may or may not have been his.

X. Freedom – Isabel, an apparently symbolic woman seen only in brief glimpses, who helps him see a way forward. (The final segment diverges from the Tarot theme, as there is no "Freedom" card.)

== Cast ==
- Christian Bale as Rick
- Cate Blanchett as Nancy
- Natalie Portman as Elizabeth
- Brian Dennehy as Joseph
- Antonio Banderas as Tonio
- Wes Bentley as Barry
- Isabel Lucas as Isabel
- Teresa Palmer as Karen
- Imogen Poots as Della
- Armin Mueller-Stahl as Father Zeitlinger
- Freida Pinto as Helen
- Cherry Jones as Ruth
- Nick Offerman as Scott
- Clifton Collins Jr. as Jordan
- Dane DeHaan as Paul
- Thomas Lennon as Tom
- Joel Kinnaman as Errol
- Jason Clarke as Johnny
- Katia Winter as Katia
- Nicky Whelan as Nicky
- Shea Whigham as Jim
- Ryan O'Neal as Ryan
- Joe Manganiello as Joe
- Michael Wincott as Herb
- Kevin Corrigan as Gus
- Fabio as Fabio
- Joe Lo Truglio as Guest
- Beau Garrett as Beau
- Nick Kroll as Nick
- Danny Strong as Danny Strong
- Jamie Harris as Burglar
- Dan Harmon as Dan (uncredited)
- Erin McGathy as Erin (uncredited)

Ben Kingsley is among the many narrators, but does not appear in the film.

== Themes and motifs ==
What do you want from me?
To weave a spell over you?
To make you dream?
Dreams are nice.
But you can't live in them.

— Helen, in Knight of Cups

Knight of Cups directly quotes a variety of dream vision works, including John Bunyan's The Pilgrim's Progress (1678), Mark Frost and David Lynch's Twin Peaks, and the Hymn of the Pearl from the Acts of Thomas. The film freely oscillates between depicting Rick's memory, dreams, and "real" experiences, becoming a stream-of-consciousness series of moments and thoughts. Quotations from the Hymn of the Pearl are read in voice-over by Rick's father in the beginning of the film, with many of the lines corresponding to Rick's experiences and feelings. Much like the Hymn of the Pearl's protagonist, Rick is expected to awaken from his "deep sleep" by remembering "the pearl".

Drugs, alcohol, and other means to altered states of consciousness play a large role in the film. Pivotal scenes include the glittery high-rise party the film begins with, at a mansion full of Hollywood elites (where a patron urges Rick to attend a ketamine party, another patron wears a virtual reality headset, and two children play Wii Sports), and Rick's kaleidoscopic journey to Las Vegas with Karen. Various characters talk about drugs, with Clifton Collins Jr.'s character Jordan telling Nick Offerman's character Scott that "the sweet spot" to get women into in order to open them to seduction "is one Xanny, four white wines". Karen says, "You see, I took drugs once, and it kind of opened up this window for me. I call it the Window of Truth."

== Production ==
=== Pre-production ===
In November 2011, the film was announced with Cate Blanchett, Christian Bale and Isabel Lucas mentioned as cast. It was also announced the film would be shot back-to-back with Song to Song. To prepare, Bale read Walker Percy's novel The Moviegoer, a book about one man's existentialist search for spiritual redemption, on Malick's suggestion.

=== Filming ===
Production on the film began in June 2012 and lasted nine weeks. During production, many of the cast and crew were spotted filming throughout Los Angeles County and Las Vegas, as most of the filming took place on the streets and in public places.

Although a script was written, Bale received no pages from it, while all other cast members received only pages of internal and verbal monologue for each shooting day. Bale later said that while filming, he was unclear about what the final film would actually be. During production, Malick used a process he calls "torpedoing", where a character is thrown into a scene without the other actors' advance knowledge, forcing them to improvise. In addition to a traditional studio, the cast also recorded their voice-over work in nontraditional places, such as in a van or by the side of the road.

=== Post-production ===
The film spent two years in post-production, which consisted of a small group of editors in the beginning and widened throughout.

== Music ==
Hanan Townshend composed the score for the film. The album was released on March 4, 2016.

Knight of Cups (Original Motion Picture Soundtrack)

Soundtrack album by Various Artists
- Released: April 4, 2016
- Length: 1:04:10
- Label: Milan Records
- Producer: Various

Knight of Cups Soundtrack
| No. | Title | Length |
|---|---|---|
| 1. | "Fantasy On a Theme by Thomas Tallis (excerpt)" | 3:48 |
| 2. | "Exodus (Excerpt)" | 16:19 |
| 3. | "Water Theme No. 1" | 3:42 |
| 4. | "The Death of Ase from Peer Gynt Suite No. 1, Op. 46 (Excerpt)" | 4:43 |
| 5. | "Spirals" | 3:55 |
| 6. | "The Pilgrim" | 2:10 |
| 7. | "Distress" | 2:12 |
| 8. | "Solveig's Song from Peer Gynt Suite No. 2, Op. 55" | 5:36 |
| 9. | "Water Theme No. 2" | 1:58 |
| 10. | "Thomas Tallis Theme" | 1:56 |
| 11. | "6 Epigraphes Antiques: Pour L'Egyptienne (Excerpt)" | 1:49 |
| 12. | "Exodus" | 2:03 |
| 13. | "Fortune" | 3:44 |
| 14. | "Ashtray Wasp" | 11:46 |
| 15. | "Water Theme No. 3" | 1:55 |
| 16. | "Dilbar Dilbara Mera" | 6:34 |

== Release ==
The film premiered in the main competition section at the 65th Berlin International Film Festival on February 8, 2015. Shortly after, Broad Green Pictures acquired distribution rights to the film. The film had its American premiere at the Santa Barbara Film Festival on February 7, 2016, and was released in the United States on March 4, 2016.

== Reception ==
Knight of Cups received mixed reviews from critics. On the review aggregator website Rotten Tomatoes, the film holds a 47% approval rating based on 186 reviews, with an average rating of 5.8/10. The site's consensus reads, "Knight of Cups finds Terrence Malick delving deeper into the painterly visual milieu he's explored in recent efforts, but even hardcore fans may struggle with the diminishing narrative returns." On Metacritic, the film has a weighted average score of 53 out of 100 based on 41 reviews, indicating "mixed or average" reviews.

Justin Chang of Variety called the film "flawed but fascinating" and a "feverish plunge into the toxic cloud of decadence" as Malick offers a "corrosive critique of Hollywood hedonism". Todd McCarthy of The Hollywood Reporter said that the "resolutely poetic and impressionist" film "conveys most bracingly [the] fleeting nature of human exchange", but the end result "is a certain tedium and repetitiveness along with the rhythmic niceties and imaginative riffs... this one mostly operates on a more dramatically mundane, private and even narcissistic level [than The Tree of Life]". Moira Macdonald of The Seattle Times praised its "dreamlike" nature, but also stated that "you keep waiting for the film to come together, for Rick to emerge as a character rather than a cipher, for the women to seem less interchangeable — in short, for a point to it all." Stephanie Zacharek of TIME wrote that the director "understands so little about women" and argued, "For loyal Malick fans, the woozy dream-logic visuals here may be enough. But this director is hardly the perceptive student of human nature he's cracked up to be." In The Arizona Republic, Bill Goodykoontz wrote, "I'm all for directors making audiences think, but ultimately, those thoughts need to lead us somewhere."

Some critics were very positive, with Matt Zoller Seitz of RogerEbert.com, who gave the film four out of four stars, stating, "Nobody else is making films like this. Not at this level...The sheer freedom of it is intoxicating." He deemed it "impenetrable and intolerable" for most audiences, and a "philosophically engaged, beatific, starchild-as-old-man's movie." In another highly positive review, Richard Brody of The New Yorker called the film "an instant classic in several genres—the confessional, the inside-Hollywood story, the Dantesque midlife-crisis drama, the religious quest, the romantic struggle, the sexual reverie, the family melodrama" and considered it "one of the great recent bursts of cinematic artistry, a carnival of images and sounds that have a sensual beauty, of light and movement, of gesture and inflection, rarely matched in any movie that isn't Malick's own." Later, in a 2016 BBC poll, Seitz voted Knight of Cups the fifth-greatest film since 2000.
