= Song to Song =

- Theatrical release poster
- Directed by: Terrence Malick
- Written by: Terrence Malick
- Produced by: Nicolas Gonda; Sarah Green; Ken Kao
- Starring: Rooney Mara; Michael Fassbender; Ryan Gosling; Natalie Portman; Cate Blanchett; Bérénice Marlohe; Holly Hunter
- Cinematography: Emmanuel Lubezki
- Edited by: Rehman Nizar Ali; Hank Corwin; Keith Fraase
- Production companies: Buckeye Pictures; Waypoint Entertainment; FilmNation Entertainment
- Distributed by: Broad Green Pictures
- Release dates: March 10, 2017 (SXSW); March 17, 2017 (United States)
- Running time: 129 minutes
- Country: United States
- Language: English
- Box office: $1.7 million

Song to Song is a 2017 American experimental romantic drama film written and directed by Terrence Malick and starring an ensemble cast including Rooney Mara, Ryan Gosling, Michael Fassbender, Natalie Portman, and Cate Blanchett. It is about finding love, obsession and betrayal in the Austin, Texas music world.

After a lengthy post-production period of over three years, the film had its world premiere at South by Southwest on March 10, 2017, and was released in the United States on March 17, 2017, by Broad Green Pictures. Critical reception for the film was mixed.

== Plot ==
In Austin, Texas, Faye feels disconnected from the world. She regularly interacts with others, hoping to feel more deeply. A guitarist, as she is looking for success as a musician, she starts an affair with record producer Cook believing it can help.

Meeting fellow musician BV, he actively pursues Faye, so they begin a relationship. He is slightly more successful than her and is also working with Cook. The producer suggest to Faye to tell BV about their affair, but chooses not to.

Faye's estranged father visits her. As she has not kept close contact with her parents, he pumps her questions, but her answers are not very informative, just that she has a few jobs and dating a musician. Faye shows apartments, walks dogs to pay her bills.

Cook and Faye keep their affair a secret from BV, and the three take a trip together to Mexico. As they move around the country, she and BV are very affectionate. Cook observes their connection, becoming envious.

Cook meets Rhonda, who is a former kindergarten teacher working as a waitress at a diner, where he courts her. As her father left them, she and her mother Miranda become more and more desperate for money. The two eventually marry and he pays someone to build Miranda a house.

Business gets rough between Cook and BV, as the latter is dissatisfied. He confronts him, unhappy to split the profits, not only because he does all of the work, but also he discovers that all of the copywrites are under the producer's name. This results in the end of their professional and personal relationship with each other.

Faye continues to have contact with Cook. After he is no longer working with BV, he offers to produce her. Faye meets up with Cook one last time, saying she can no longer sleep with him, as she realizes she is in love with BV.

Faye feels increasingly guilty about her affair with Cook, which BV picks up on. As she is acting strangely and crying, he point blank asks her if she has slept with him. When Faye says yes, BV asks for details. As she changes the details, from once to several, he breaks up with her.

Faye then has a relationship with Zoey, a French woman living in the US. Rhonda begins to feel uncomfortable with Cook's wild lifestyle, which includes sex with other women and drugs. BV dates New Yorker Amanda for some time, but eventually they break up too.

Rhonda takes her own life, leaving Cook shocked and saddened. Faye and BV reconnect and start dating again. Later, BV moves back west to his hometown to take care of his sick father and the rest of his family, and pursues a simpler life, taking a job as a worker at a drilling rig. Faye follows him and the two of them declare their eternal love for each other.

== Cast ==
- Ryan Gosling as BV
- Michael Fassbender as Cook
- Rooney Mara as Faye
- Natalie Portman as Rhonda
- Cate Blanchett as Amanda
- Lykke Li as Lykke
- Val Kilmer as Duane
- Bérénice Marlohe as Zoey
- Holly Hunter as Miranda
- Tom Sturridge as BV's Brother
- Austin Amelio as BV's Brother
- Linda Emond as Judy, BV's Mother

Florence Welch, Patti Smith, Iggy Pop, The Black Lips, Alan Palomo, John Lydon, Flea, Spank Rock, Tegan Quin, Sara Quin, Anthony Kiedis, Chad Smith, Josh Klinghoffer, First Aid Kit, Erik Sprague and Big Freedia, all make cameo appearances in the film. Jeremy O. Harris, Heather Kafka, Camille Natta, and Savannah Welch all appear uncredited.

== Production ==
=== Development ===
In November 2011 it was announced that Ryan Gosling, Christian Bale, Cate Blanchett, Rooney Mara and Haley Bennett had been cast in the film. The film was originally titled Lawless, but Malick allowed filmmaker John Hillcoat to use the title for his 2012 film. When the film was announced as in pre-production in November 2011, the production company was FilmNation Entertainment and its producers were Sarah Green and Nicolas Gonda. In November 2012 it was announced that Bérénice Marlohe had joined the cast. It was revealed in March 2015 the title was Weightless. In February 2016 Sarah Green confirmed the title was Weightless, but it was later changed to Song to Song. In December 2016 it was announced that Iggy Pop, John Lydon, Arcade Fire, Alan Palomo, Iron & Wine, Fleet Foxes and The Black Lips would appear in the film.

=== Filming ===
Rooney Mara said in December 2011 that filming was scheduled to begin in September 2012. That month, scenes were shot in Austin, Texas. In March 2012 Alan Palomo of Neon Indian shot scenes for the film. In October 2012 Mara, Michael Fassbender, Florence Welch and Holly Hunter were spotted on set filming. Mara said in an interview that Patti Smith shot scenes for the film, playing herself. In November 2012 Val Kilmer was spotted filming. Christian Bale only shot three days on the film, but his scenes were ultimately cut.

=== Post-production ===
Post-production on the film took longer than expected because the film's eight-hour first cut required Malick to ask the financiers and studios more than once for additional time.

In October 2013, Michael Fassbender provided voice-over that the actor said might be cut from the completed film: "I'm not sure [if I'm in the final cut]. I've got to go actually and do some more voice-over ... just like reams and reams of that." Bale also expressed doubts about whether he would appear, saying in November 2013, "I unfortunately wasn't able to do everything I was meant to do, so I ended up doing like three, four days on that. Which in Terry's world means you're never going to see me in it." In January 2016 Mara revealed she did voice-over for the film.

Bale, Haley Bennett, Benicio del Toro, Arcade Fire, Iron & Wine, Fleet Foxes, Boyd Holbrook, Trevante Rhodes and Angela Bettis were all cut from the film.

== Release ==
In February 2015 Broad Green Pictures acquired U.S distribution rights to the film. It had its world premiere at South by Southwest on March 10, 2017. The film was released on March 17, 2017.

== Reception ==
On review aggregator website Rotten Tomatoes, it has a 43% approval rating based on 129 critics and an average rating of 5.5/10. The site's critical consensus reads, "As visually sumptuous as it is narratively spartan, Terrence Malick's Song to Song echoes elements of the writer-director's recent work—for better and for worse." On Metacritic the film holds a rating of 55 out of 100, based on 34 critics, indicating "mixed or average reviews".

In a five-star review for The Independent, Christopher Hooton claimed that it has become fashionable among critics to ridicule Malick's recent films, but that given a chance the film is a "masterpiece" and even "life-changing". In Entertainment Weekly, Joe McGovern derided it as "incoherent, disconnected, self-interrupting, obsessed with pointless minutiae and crammed full of odd, limp stabs at profundity [...] you’ll find yourself searching in the margins of each shot for something or someone tangible to grasp onto."

Film critic Matt Zoller Seitz of RogerEbert.com gave the film two and a half out of four stars. Although he had always praised Malick's work and style in the past ("I don't believe that the Austin-based director has ever made a bad movie"), he wrote that Song to Song "is the first Malick film I’ve watched where the dots never came together to form a legible image", emphasizing the film's need for more "rhetorical connective tissue" that would further connect to the film's themes as well as better characterizations, because of the film's highly chaotic nature. Seitz concluded that the film is "a brainy concept album made up of B-sides and filler. The musicianship is superb but the songs needed work."
