= Terrence Malick =

American filmmaker (born 1943)

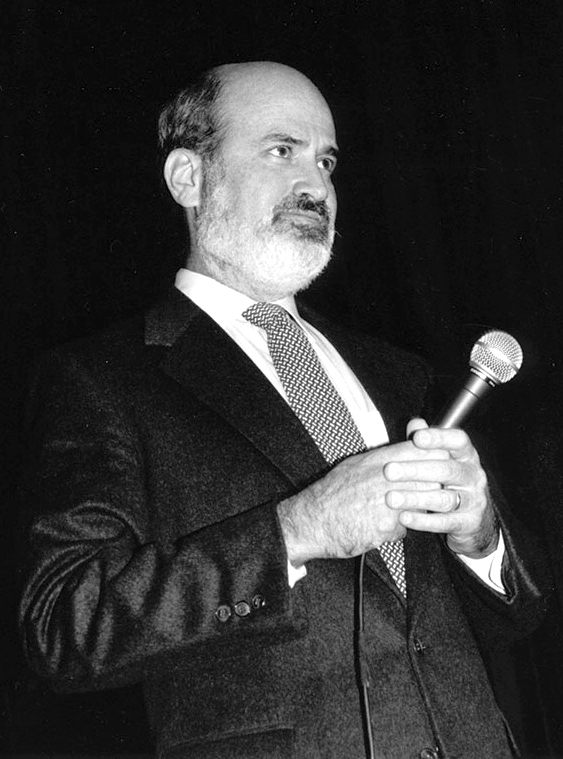
- Malick in 1993
- Born: Terrence Frederick Malick; November 30, 1943 (age 82); Ottawa, Illinois, U.S.
- Education: Harvard University (BA); AFI Conservatory (MFA)
- Occupations: Film director; screenwriter; producer
- Years active: 1969–present
- Notable work: Full list
- Spouses: Jill Jakes (m. 1970; div. 1976) Michèle Morette (m. 1985; div. 1998) Alexandra Wallace (m. 1998)
- Awards: Full list

Terrence Frederick Malick (/ˈmælɪk/; born November 30, 1943) is an American filmmaker. Malick began his career as part of the New Hollywood generation of filmmakers and received numerous accolades, including the Palme d'Or and the Golden Bear, in addition to nominations for three Academy Awards, a Golden Globe Award, a DGA Award, and a WGA Award.

Malick made his feature film debut with the crime drama Badlands (1973), followed by the romantic period drama Days of Heaven (1978), which earned him a nomination for the Golden Globe Award for Best Director. He then directed the World War II epic The Thin Red Line (1998), for which he was nominated for the Academy Award for Best Director, the historical romantic drama The New World (2005), and the experimental coming-of-age drama The Tree of Life (2011), for which he was again nominated for the Academy Award for Best Director and won the Cannes Film Festival's Palme d'Or.

After The Tree of Life, Malick's directorial output in the 2010s became more consistent and experimental with To the Wonder (2013), Knight of Cups (2015), Song to Song (2017), and A Hidden Life (2019). During this time he also directed the documentary film Voyage of Time (2016) about the birth and death of the universe. Malick has frequently collaborated with Emmanuel Lubezki, who served as the director of photography on five of his films.

Malick's films explore themes such as transcendence and conflicts between reason and instinct. They typically have broad philosophical and spiritual overtones and employ meditative voice-overs by their characters. Malick's style has polarized scholars and audiences; many praise his films for their lavish cinematography and aesthetics, but others fault them for lacking plot and character development. His work has nonetheless ranked highly in retrospective decade-end and all-time polls.

== Life and career ==
=== Early years and education ===
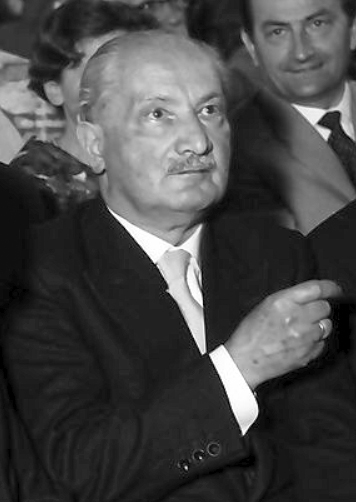
Martin Heidegger's Vom Wesen des Grundes (The Essence of Reasons) was translated into English by Malick and published in 1969.

Malick was born in Ottawa, Illinois. He is the son of Irene (née Thompson; 1912–2011) and Emil A. Malick (1917–2013), a geologist. His paternal grandparents were of Assyrian descent from Urmia, while his mother was an Irish Catholic. Malick attended St. Stephen's Episcopal School in Austin, Texas, while his family lived in Bartlesville, Oklahoma.

Malick had two younger brothers, Chris and Larry. Larry Malick was a guitarist who went to study in Spain with Andrés Segovia in the late 1960s. In 1968, Larry intentionally broke his own hands due to pressure over his musical studies. Their father Emil went to Spain to help Larry, but his son died shortly after, possibly by suicide. The early death of Malick's younger brother has been explored and referenced in his films The Tree of Life (2011) and Knight of Cups (2015).

Malick graduated from Harvard College in 1965 with a Bachelor of Arts, summa cum laude, and was elected to Phi Beta Kappa. He received a Rhodes Scholarship, which he used to study philosophy at Oxford University's Magdalen College. After a disagreement with his advisor, Gilbert Ryle, over Malick's thesis on the concept of world in Kierkegaard, Heidegger, and Wittgenstein, Malick left Oxford without a degree. In 1969, Northwestern University Press published Malick's translation of Heidegger's Vom Wesen des Grundes as The Essence of Reasons.

After returning to the United States, Malick taught philosophy at the Massachusetts Institute of Technology while freelancing as a journalist. He wrote articles for Newsweek, The New Yorker, and Life.

=== 1969–1978: Film debut and acclaim ===
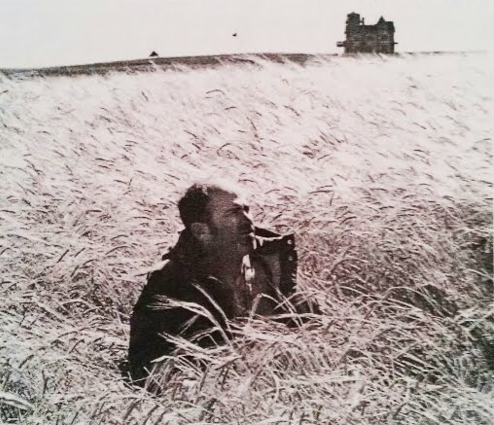
Malick filming Days of Heaven (1978)

Malick started his film career after earning an MFA from the brand-new AFI Conservatory in 1969, directing the short film Lanton Mills. At the AFI, he established contacts with people such as actor Jack Nicholson, longtime collaborator Jack Fisk, and agent Mike Medavoy, who procured for Malick freelance work revising scripts. He wrote early uncredited drafts of Dirty Harry (1971) and Drive, He Said (1971), and is credited with the screenplay for Pocket Money (1972). Malick also co-wrote The Gravy Train (1974) under the pseudonym David Whitney.

Malick's first feature-length work as a director was Badlands, an independent film starring Martin Sheen and Sissy Spacek as a young couple on a crime spree in the 1950s Midwest. It was influenced by the crimes of convicted teenage spree killer Charles Starkweather. Malick raised half the budget by approaching people outside of the industry, including doctors and dentists, and by contributing $25,000 from his personal savings. The rest was raised by executive producer Edward R. Pressman. After a troubled production that included many crew members leaving halfway through, Badlands drew raves upon its premiere at the New York Film Festival. As a result, Warner Bros. bought distribution rights for three times its budget.

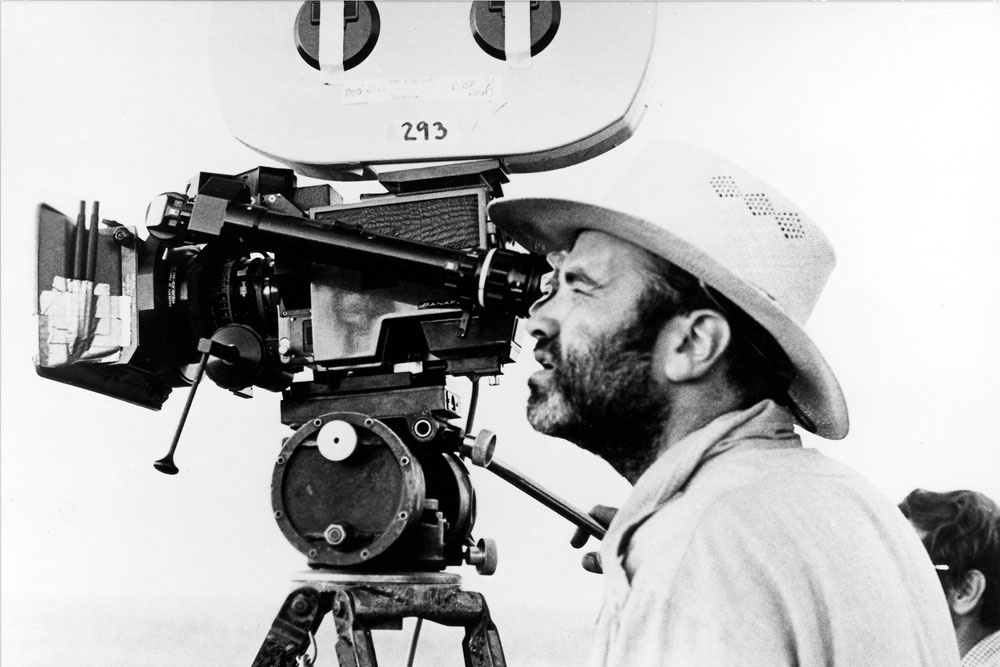
Malick during production of the 1978 film Days of Heaven

Malick's second film was the Paramount-produced Days of Heaven, about a love triangle that develops in the farm country of the Texas Panhandle in the early 20th century. Production began in the fall of 1976 in Alberta, Canada. The film was mostly shot during the golden hour, with primarily natural light. Much like Malick's first feature, Days of Heaven had a lengthy and troubled production, with several members of the production crew quitting before shooting was finished, mainly due to disagreements with Malick's idiosyncratic directorial style. The film likewise had a troubled post-production phase. Billy Weber and Malick spent two years editing it, during which they experimented with unconventional editing and voice-over techniques once they realized the picture they had set out to make would not fully work.

Days of Heaven was finally released in 1978 to mostly positive responses from critics. Its cinematography was widely praised, although some found its story lackluster. In The New York Times, Harold C. Schonberg wrote that it "is full of elegant and striking photography; and it is an intolerably artsy, artificial film." It won the Academy Award for Best Cinematography and the prize for Best Director at the 1979 Cannes Film Festival. Its reputation has since greatly improved, having been voted one of the 50 greatest American films ever made in a 2015 critics' poll published by the BBC. Film critic Roger Ebert included the film in his 1997 list of "The Great Movies", calling it "one of the most beautiful films ever made" and praising Malick's decision to have 16-year-old Linda Manz deliver its voice-over, writing: "Malick's purpose is not to tell a story of melodrama, but one of loss. His tone is elegiac. [...] This is a movie made by a man who knew how something felt, and found a way to evoke it in us."

Following the release of Days of Heaven, Malick began developing a project for Paramount, titled Q, that explored the origins of life on earth. During pre-production, he suddenly moved to Paris and disappeared from public view for years. During this time, he wrote a number of screenplays, including The English Speaker, about Josef Breuer's analysis of Anna O.; adaptations of Walker Percy's novel The Moviegoer and Larry McMurtry's The Desert Rose; a script about the parallel lives of singer Jerry Lee Lewis and pastor Jerry Falwell; and a stage adaptation of the Japanese film Sansho the Bailiff that was to be directed by Polish filmmaker Andrzej Wajda, in addition to continuing work on the Q script. Q was not made, but Malick's work on the project provided material for The Tree of Life and eventually became the basis for Voyage of Time. Jack Fisk, a longtime production designer on Malick's films, has said Malick was shooting film during this time as well. Martin Sheen has said his conversations with Malick in Paris in the early 1980s restored Sheen's Catholic faith.

=== 1997–2011: Return to cinema ===
Malick returned to directing in 1997 with The Thin Red Line, released two decades after his previous film. A loose adaptation of James Jones's World War II novel of the same name, it features a large ensemble cast, including Sean Penn, Adrien Brody, Jim Caviezel, Nick Nolte, Ben Chaplin, Elias Koteas, Woody Harrelson, George Clooney, and John Travolta. Filming took place predominantly in the Daintree Rainforest in Queensland, Australia and in the Solomon Islands.

The film received critical acclaim, was nominated for seven Academy Awards, and won the Golden Bear at the 49th Berlin International Film Festival. The Thin Red Line has since been ranked among the best films of the 1990s in Complex, The A.V. Club, Slant, Paste, and Film Comment.

After learning of Malick's work on an article about Che Guevara during the 1960s, Steven Soderbergh offered Malick the chance to write and direct a film about Guevara he had been developing with Benicio del Toro. Malick accepted and produced a screenplay focused on Guevara's failed revolution in Bolivia. After a year and a half, the financing had not come together entirely, and Malick was given the opportunity to direct The New World, a script he had begun developing in the 1970s. He left the Guevara project in March 2004, and Soderbergh took over as director, leading to the film Che (2008). The New World, based on the story of John Smith and Pocahontas in the Virginia Colony, was released in 2005. Over one million feet of film were shot, and three different cuts of varying length were released.

While the film was nominated for the Academy Award for Best Cinematography, critical reception was divided throughout its theatrical run; many praised its visuals and acting while finding its narrative unfocused. Five critics later named The New World one of the best films of its decade, and it ranked 39th in a 2016 BBC poll of the greatest films since 2000.

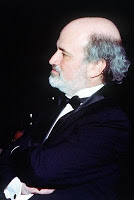
Malick at the Cannes Film Festival premiere of The Tree of Life

Malick's fifth feature, The Tree of Life, was filmed in Smithville, Texas, and elsewhere during 2008. Starring Brad Pitt, Jessica Chastain, and Sean Penn, it is a family drama spanning multiple time periods; it focuses on an individual's struggle to reconcile love, mercy and beauty with the existence of illness, suffering and death. It premiered at the 2011 Cannes Film Festival, where it won the Palme d'Or. It later won the FIPRESCI Award for the Best Film of the Year. At the 84th Academy Awards, it was nominated for three awards, including the Academy Award for Best Picture, Best Director for Malick, and Best Cinematography for Emmanuel Lubezki. A limited theatrical release in the United States began on May 27, 2011.

Malick scholars Christopher B. Barnett and Clark J. Elliston wrote that it became "arguably [Malick's] most acclaimed work". It was voted the 79th greatest American film of all time in a 2015 BBC Culture poll of 62 international film critics. The work was also ranked the seventh-greatest film since 2000 in a worldwide critics' poll by BBC.

=== 2012–2017: Career fluctuations ===
Malick's sixth feature, To the Wonder, was shot predominantly in Bartlesville, Oklahoma; a few scenes were filmed in Pawhuska, Oklahoma, and at the Tulsa Port of Catoosa. The film stars Ben Affleck, Rachel McAdams, Olga Kurylenko, and Javier Bardem. To the Wonder had its world premiere at the 69th Venice International Film Festival on September 2, 2012, and opened theatrically in the U.S. on April 12, 2013. Critical response to the film was markedly divided, and it has been called "arguably [Malick's] most derided".

On November 1, 2011, Filmnation Entertainment announced international sales for Malick's next two projects: Lawless (later released as Song to Song) and Knight of Cups. Both films have large ensemble casts, with many actors appearing in both. The films were shot back-to-back in 2012, Song to Song primarily in Austin, Texas, and Knight of Cups in Los Angeles and Las Vegas. During the weekend of September 16, 2011, Malick and a small crew were seen filming Christian Bale and Haley Bennett at the Austin City Limits Music Festival as part of preliminary shooting for Song to Song. Malick was also seen directing Ryan Gosling and Rooney Mara at the Fun Fun Fun Fest on November 4, 2011. Knight of Cups had its world premiere at the Berlin International Film Festival in February 2015, and was met with mixed reactions. It was released in the U.S. on March 4, 2016, by Broad Green Pictures.

Song to Song had its world premiere at South by Southwest on March 10, 2017, before being released theatrically in the U.S. on March 17 by Broad Green Pictures, and was met with mixed reactions. Concurrent with these two features, Malick continued work on an Imax documentary, Voyage of Time, that examines the birth and death of the known universe. The Hollywood Reporter called it "a celebration of the Earth, displaying the whole of time, from the birth of the universe to its final collapse." The film is the culmination of a project Malick had been working on for over 40 years, and has been described by Malick as "one of my greatest dreams". It features footage Malick and collaborators shot over the years, and expands on the footage that special effects luminaries Douglas Trumbull (2001) and Dan Glass (The Matrix) created for The Tree of Life. It was released in two versions: a 40-minute IMAX version (Voyage of Time: The IMAX Experience) with narration by Brad Pitt, and a 90-minute feature-length version (Voyage of Time: Life's Journey) with narration by Cate Blanchett. The feature-length version had its world premiere on September 7, 2016, at the 73rd Venice International Film Festival. The IMAX version was released on October 7, 2016, by IMAX Corporation and Broad Green Pictures.

=== 2019–present ===
Malick's next film, A Hidden Life, depicts the life of Austria's Franz Jägerstätter, a conscientious objector during World War II who was put to death at age 36 for undermining military actions and was later declared a martyr and beatified by the Catholic Church. August Diehl stars as Jägerstätter, with Valerie Pachner as his wife, Franziska. The film was shot in Studio Babelsberg in Potsdam, Germany, in the summer of 2016, and in parts of northern Italy, such as Brixen, South Tyrol, and the small mountain village of Sappada. It was released in 2019. Malick has said that, compared to his more recent films, with A Hidden Life he had "repented and gone back to working with a much tighter script".

In August and September 2016, Malick directed a commercial, "Notes of a Woman", released on February 26, 2017, for Mon Guerlain perfume. Starring Angelina Jolie, it was shot at her and Brad Pitt's Château Miraval estate in Correns and photographed by Austrian cinematographer Christian Berger.

==== Upcoming projects ====
On June 7, 2019, Malick reportedly started shooting his next film, code-named The Last Planet, near Rome, Italy. The film will tell the story of Jesus's life through a series of parables. On September 8, the cast was revealed to include Géza Röhrig as Jesus, Matthias Schoenaerts as Saint Peter, and Mark Rylance as four versions of Satan. On November 20, 2020, it was announced that the film's name would be The Way of the Wind. As of 2026, Malick is still editing the film.

== Personal life ==
While the perception of Malick as a recluse is inaccurate, he is nevertheless famously protective of his private life. His contracts stipulate that his likeness may not be used for promotional purposes, and he routinely declines requests for interviews.

From 1970 to 1976, Malick was married to Jill Jakes. His companion in the late 1970s was director and screenwriter Michie Gleason. In 1985 in France, he married Michèle Marie Morette, whom he met in Paris in 1980; in 1996, Malick asked for a divorce, which was granted. Afterward he married Alexandra "Ecky" Wallace, his high-school sweetheart.

Malick's semi-autobiographical film To the Wonder was inspired by his relationships with Morette and Wallace.

Since at least 2011, Malick has lived in Austin, Texas.

== Themes and style ==
Critics have noted the philosophical themes of Malick's films. According to film scholar Lloyd Michaels, Malick's main themes include "the isolated individual's desire for transcendence amidst established social institutions, the grandeur and untouched beauty of nature, the competing claims of instinct and reason, and the lure of the open road". He named Days of Heaven as one in a group of acclaimed films from the 1970s that were intended to revolutionize the American epic film. Michaels argued that, like The Godfather films (1972, 1974), Nashville (1975), and The Deer Hunter (1978), Days of Heaven delves into "certain national myths" as an idiosyncratic type of Western, "particularly the migration westward, the dream of personal success, and the clash of agrarian and industrial economies". Roger Ebert wrote that Malick's body of work had a unifying theme: "Human lives diminish beneath the overarching majesty of the world." In Ebert's opinion, Malick was among the few remaining directors who yearned "to make no less than a masterpiece". Reviewing The Tree of Life, The New York Times critic A. O. Scott compared Malick to innovative "homegrown romantics" such as the writers Walt Whitman, Hart Crane, James Agee, and Herman Melville, in the sense that their "definitive writings" also "did not sit comfortably or find universal favor in their own time" but nonetheless "leaned perpetually into the future, pushing their readers forward toward a new horizon of understanding".

Malick's body of work has inspired polarized opinions. According to Michaels, "few American directors have inspired such adulation and rejection with each successive film" as Malick. Michaels said that in all of American cinema, Malick is the filmmaker most frequently "granted genius status after creating such a discontinuous and limited body of work". Malick's work has broad philosophical and spiritual overtones, sometimes in the form of meditative voice-overs by individual characters. Some critics find these elements engaging and unique, while others find them pretentious and gratuitous, particularly in his post-hiatus work. Michaels wrote that scholars' and film enthusiasts' opinions of Days of Heaven show that the "debate continues to revolve around what to make of 'its extremities of beauty', whether the exquisite lighting, painterly compositions, dreamy dissolves, and fluid camera movements, combined with the epic grandeur and elegiac tone, sufficiently compensate for the thinness of the tale, the two-dimensionality of the characters, and the resulting emotional detachment of the audience." Reverse Shot journalist Chris Wisniewski called Days of Heaven and The New World not "literary nor theatrical" but "principally cinematic" in their aesthetic, intimating narrative, emotional, and conceptual themes through the use of "image and sound" instead of "foregrounding dialogue, events or characters". He highlighted Malick's use of "rambling philosophical voiceovers; the placid images of nature, offering quiet contrast to the evil deeds of men; the stunning cinematography, often achieved with natural light; the striking use of music".

== Filmography ==
Year	Title	Distributor
1973	Badlands	Warner Bros.
1978	Days of Heaven	Paramount Pictures
1998	The Thin Red Line	20th Century Fox
2005	The New World	New Line Cinema
2011	The Tree of Life	Fox Searchlight Pictures
2012	To the Wonder	Magnolia Pictures
2015	Knight of Cups	Broad Green Pictures
2016	Voyage of Time	Broad Green Pictures / IMAX Corporation
2017	Song to Song	Broad Green Pictures
2019	A Hidden Life	Fox Searchlight Pictures
TBA	The Way of the Wind	TBA

== Awards and nominations ==
Malick has received three Academy Award nominations; two for Best Director, for The Thin Red Line and The Tree of Life, and a nomination for Best Adapted Screenplay for the former film. He was awarded the Golden Bear at the 49th Berlin International Film Festival for The Thin Red Line, and the Palme d'Or at the 64th Cannes Film Festival for The Tree of Life.

== Sources ==
- Biskind, Peter. Easy Riders, Raging Bulls, London: Bloomsbury, 1998.
- Biskind, Peter. "'The Runaway Genius'". Vanity Fair. April 23, 2010. Archived from the original on January 15, 2011., Vanity Fair, 460, December 1998, 116–125.
- Cavell, Stanley. The World Viewed: Reflections on the Ontology of Film, Enlarged Edition, Cambridge, Massachusetts: Harvard University Press, 1979.
- Chion, Michel. The Voice in Cinema, translated by Claudia Gorbman, New York & Chichester: Columbia University Press, 1999.
- Ciment, Michel. 'Entretien avec Terrence Malick', Positif, 170, June 1975, 30–34.
- Cook, G. Richardson. 'The Filming of Badlands: An Interview with Terry Malick', Filmmakers Newsletter, 7:8, June 1974, 30–32.
- Crofts, Charlotte. 'From the "Hegemony of the Eye" to the "Hierarchy of Perception": The Reconfiguration of Sound and Image in Terrence Malick's Days of Heaven', Journal of Media Practice, 2:1, 2001, 19–29.
- Denson, G. Roger (June 6, 2011), "Terrence Malick's The Tree of Life Plays Garden of Eden to the Family of Man", The Huffington Post
- Docherty, Cameron. 'Maverick Back from the Badlands', The Sunday Times, Culture, June 7, 1998, 4.
- Donougho, Martin. 'West of Eden: Terrence Malick's Days of Heaven', Postscript: Essays in Film and the Humanities, 5:1, Fall 1985, 17–30.
- Ebert, Roger, "Review of Days of Heaven", Chicago Sun-Times Inc.
- Fox, Terry Curtis. 'The Last Ray of Light', Film Comment, 14:5, September/October 1978, 27–28.
- Fuller, Graham. 'Exile on Main Street', The Observer, December 13, 1998, 5.
- Hartl, John. 'Badlands Director Ending his Long Absence', The Seattle Times, March 8, 1998.
- Henderson, Brian. 'Exploring Badlands'. Wide Angle: A Quarterly Journal of Film Theory, Criticism and Practice, 5:4, 1983, 38–51.
- Keyser, Les. Hollywood in the Seventies, London: Tantivy Press, 1981.
- Maher Jr., Paul (2014). One Big Soul: An Oral History of Terrence Malick. Upstart Crow Publishing. ISBN 978-1-304-59527-0.
- Monaco, James. "Badlands", Take One, 4:1, September/October 1972, 32.
- Malick interview, American Film Institute Report, 4:4, Winter 1973, 48.
- Newman, Kim. "Whatever Happened to Whatsisname?", Empire, February 1994, 88–89.
- Riley, Brooks. "Interview with Nestor Almendros", Film Comment, 14:5, September/October 1978, 28–31.
- Stivers, Clint and Kirsten F. Benson. "'What's Your Name, Kid?': The Acousmatic Voiceovers of Private Edward P. Train in The Thin Red Line", Postscript: Essays in Film and the Humanities, 34:2/3, 2015, 36-52.
- Telotte, J. P. "Badlands and the Souvenir Drive", Western Humanities Review, 40:2, Summer 1986, 101–14.
- Walker, Beverly (Spring 1975), "Malick on Badlands", Sight and Sound, 44, no. 2, pp. 82–83 – via Eskimo North
- Wondra, Janet. "A Gaze Unbecoming: Schooling the Child for Femininity in Days of Heaven", Wide Angle, 16:4, October 1994, 5–22.
