= Angel and the Badman (2026 film) =

- Theatrical release poster
- Directed by: Julio Quintana
- Written by: Jaime Hernandez; Kevin M. Townsend; Christopher Tuffin
- Produced by: Jaime Hernandez; Christopher Tuffin
- Starring: Zachary Levi; Meg Fraser; Neal McDonough; Tommy Lee Jones
- Cinematography: Alex Quintana
- Music by: Hanan Townshend
- Production company: Strong Island
- Distributed by: Angel Studios
- Release date: October 9, 2026
- Running time: 97 minutes
- Country: United States
- Language: English
- Box office: $4 million

Angel and the Badman is a 2026 American Western film directed by Julio Quintana. It is a remake of the 1947 film of the same name, and stars Zachary Levi, Meg Fraser, Neal McDonough, and Tommy Lee Jones.

The film was released by Angel Studios on October 9, 2026.

== Cast ==
- Zachary Levi as Quirt Evans
- Neal McDonough as Laredo
- Tommy Lee Jones as Marshal McClintock
- Meg Fraser as Penny
- Jean Louisa Kelly as Irene Worth
- Barrett Ellis Luca as Johnny Worth
- Melissa Chambers as Harriet
- Maurice Greene as Tully
- Jesús Carús as Hondo
- Sean Bridgers as Deputy Eli
- Manny Greenfield as Dr. Mangram
- Eric T. Esparza as Nelson
- Nicholas Logan as Randy McCall
- John Pyper-Ferguson as Frederick Carson
- Matthew Blood-Smyth as Reverend Levi Penrose
- Nathan Kostenko as Young Church Man
- James Hal Hardy as Ranch Hand #1
- Angel Rosario Jr. as Ranch Hand #2
- Andrew S Dixon as Swollen Leg Man
- Danielle Nicole Chambers as Lila
- Rocky Ramirez as Angry Brothel Man
- Mary Buss as Madame
- Peter Marmentini as Man In Crowd
- Mélida Saviz as Paloma

== Production ==
Principal photography took place in Santa Fe, New Mexico on November 2025.

== Release ==
Angel and the Badman was released in the United States on October 9, 2026, by Angel Studios.

== Reception ==
=== Box office ===
In the United States and Canada, the film debuted to $2.1 million from 2,263 theaters, finishing in 10th.

=== Critical response ===
On the review aggregator website Rotten Tomatoes, 23% of 13 critics' reviews are positive, with an average rating of 5.2/10.

Michael Phillips of Variety gave the film a negative review and wrote, "The frustration arrives all too soon. There’s very little piety in the 1947 film, and there’s serious chemistry between Wayne and Russell. The new Angel and the Badman trades those virtues for plenty of sanctimony and not much of a spark."
