= Gregory Diaz IV =

American actor (born 2005)

- Born: May 2, 2005 (age 20); Manhattan, New York City, U.S.
- Occupation: Actor
- Years active: 2015–present

Gregory Diaz IV (born May 2, 2005) is an American actor. Diaz is known for his role as Quentin in the Netflix series Unbreakable Kimmy Schmidt and Sonny in the musical drama In the Heights.

== Early life and education ==
Diaz was born and raised in Manhattan, New York City, and is of Puerto Rican descent. He attended Professional Performing Arts High School for one semester before transferring to Dwight Global Online.

== Career ==
In 2015, Diaz was cast as Obnoxious Kid #1 in Carrie Pilby. In 2016, Diaz joined the revival and first all-kid professional cast of You're a Good Man, Charlie Brown as Schroeder at the York Theater. Diaz went on to join the closing cast Broadway production of Matilda the Musical as a Bruce swing. Early in 2017, Diaz was cast as Tommy in the last U.S. tour production of Matilda the Musical.

Diaz played the role of boy in January 2018 in the production of Zurich at NYTW, and earned a nomination for Outstanding ensemble at the New York Innovative Theatre Awards - Home. In March 2018, Diaz appeared in the Netflix series Unbreakable Kimmy Schmidt as Quentin. Diaz was cast as lead role Pedro in May 2018 in the production of Pedro Pan at the Acorn theatre. He won a NYMF Performance award.

In June 2018, it was announced that Diaz had been cast as Luis Acosta in the comedy film Vampires vs. the Bronx. In December 2019, Diaz made a guest starring appearance in NBC's series New Amsterdam.

In July 2022, it was announced that Diaz would be a part of the cast of The Long Game alongside Jay Hernandez, Julian Works, Jaina Lee Ortiz, Brett Cullen, Oscar Nuñez, and Paulina Chávez.

== Filmography ==
Film and Television
Year	Title	Role	Notes
2015	Carrie Pilby	Obnoxious Kid #1	
2018	Unbreakable Kimmy Schmidt	Quentin	2 episodes
2020	New Amsterdam	Cephas Fernandez	Episode: "Sabbath"
2020	Vampires vs. the Bronx	Luis Acosta	
2021	In the Heights	Sonny	
2023	The Long Game	Gene Vasquez	

== Stage ==
Year	Production	Role	Location	Category
2016	You're a Good Man, Charlie Brown	Schroeder	York Theater	Off Broadway
2016	Matilda the Musical	Bruce Swing	Shubert Theatre	Broadway
2017	Matilda US Acrobat Tour	Tommy	Various	National Tour
2018	Zurich	Boy	NYTW	Off Broadway
2018	Pedro Pan	Pedro	Acorn Theatre	Off Broadway
2019	The Bitter Sweets	Aaron	Acorn Theatre	Off Broadway

== Awards and nominations ==
Year	Award	Category	Nominated work	Result	Ref.
2018	New York Innovative Theatre Awards	Outstanding Ensemble	Zurich	Nominated	
2018	New York Musical Theatre Festival	Performance award	Pedro Pan	Won	
