= The Long Game (film) =

2023 film by Julio Quintana

- Release poster
- Directed by: Julio Quintana
- Screenplay by: Paco Farias; Jennifer C. Stetson; Julio Quintana
- Based on: Mustang Miracle by Humberto G. Garcia
- Produced by: Ben Howard; Dennis Quaid; Laura Quaid; Marla Quintana; Javier Chapa
- Starring: Jay Hernandez; Julian Works; Jaina Lee Ortiz; Brett Cullen; Oscar Nuñez; Paulina Chávez; Gregory Diaz IV; José Julián; Cheech Marin; Dennis Quaid
- Cinematography: Alex Quintana
- Edited by: James K. Crouch
- Music by: Hanan Townshend
- Production companies: HarbourView; Fifth Season; Mucho Mas Media; Bonniedale; Jaguar Bite
- Distributed by: Mucho Mas Releasing
- Release dates: March 12, 2023 (SXSW); April 12, 2024 (United States)
- Running time: 112 minutes
- Country: United States
- Language: English
- Box office: $3.1 million

The Long Game is a 2023 American historical sports drama film directed by Julio Quintana, who co-wrote the screenplay with Paco Farias and Jennifer C. Stetson, based on Humberto G. Garcia's 2010 non-fiction book Mustang Miracle. The film stars Jay Hernandez, Julian Works, Jaina Lee Ortiz, Brett Cullen, Oscar Nuñez, Paulina Chávez, Gregory Diaz IV, José Julián, Cheech Marin, and Dennis Quaid.

The Long Game premiered at the 2023 South by Southwest Film & TV Festival, and was released theatrically in the United States by Mucho Mas Media on April 12, 2024.

Mexican professional boxer Canelo Álvarez served as executive-producer for the film.

== Plot ==
In 1956 Del Rio, Texas, Mexican-American teenager Joe Trevino fights with three white boys in an alley, later rescued by his friends Felipe Romero, Mario Lomas, Gene Vasquez, and Lupe Felan. Meanwhile, J.B. Peña, a former Marine and the new high school superintendent, prepares nervously for a meeting with the head of the local country club. At the club, the boys work as caddies for members including Judge Milton Cox and his son Tim. Joe is tipped for his helpfulness, while others are treated dismissively.

The group hit golf balls across a field. Joe accidentally shatters the driver's side window of J.B.'s passing car. J.B. investigates the hill and later arrives meets his old Marine friend, golf pro Frank Mitchell. Bleeding from his forehead, J.B. pleads with club president Mr. Glenn to become a member, citing his love for golf. Glenn refuses, claiming other members would be uncomfortable with a Mexican member.

At school, Joe freezes when challenged to show off in front of a girl named Daniella. J.B. disagrees with Principal Guerra's militaristic discipline approach on students. During an assembly, J.B. recognizes the boys from the incident and learns from Guerra about the annual state high school golf championship. Joe admits to being the one who hit the ball, and J.B. offers to forgive the damage if the boys form a golf team. All but Joe agree, but they acknowledge that they need him to succeed.

J.B. discusses the situation with his father Adelio. Frank and club secretary Gayle join the Peñas for dinner, and J.B. proposes Frank serve as assistant coach. J.B. confronts Joe about his reluctance to join, encouraging him to think about his future. Frank eventually agrees to coach after seeing the boys' skills. Pollo advises Joe to reconsider, and Joe shows up to practice. The boys train rigorously, practicing at night and in poor weather.

In their first tournament, the team is met with hostility due to their ethnicity. Their sportsmanship earns them an invitation to the next tournament. At a celebratory diner outing, the team is refused service; Joe retaliates by breaking the windows with golf balls. Daniela brings Joe to a secluded spot to share her dreams, and they begin dating. That night, Adelio burns Joe's golf clubs; Joe knocks off his father's prosthetic leg. At another tournament, Tim Cox sabotages Joe's play, and Joe is disqualified for retaliating. Gene's strong performance helps the team advance. At their hotel, Frank and J.B. argue over strict adherence to rules. That night, the boys sneak into Mexico and fight with locals who call them "not real Mexicans". Joe and Daniella argue after she reveals plans to move to Austin for a writing program, and Joe reacts negatively.

At the state championship, police arrive to arrest Joe for the earlier diner vandalism. Judge Cox offers to drop charges if the team forfeits. J.B. takes the blame, infuriating Cox. He is jailed but quickly released through Principal Guerra's connections. Drunk and defeated, J.B. is encouraged by Pollo to keep fighting.

On the tournament's second day, J.B. allows the team to play as themselves. Despite heavy rain, they lead going into the final hole. Joe remains composed against Tim and wins the match. Denied a traditional ceremony, the team confidently walks through the club. Back in Del Rio, the team is welcomed by a cheering crowd, including Lucy, Guerra, Pollo, and a now-proud Adelio. Sometime later, Joe calls J.B. to cancel a tee time, revealing he has gone to Austin to reconnect with Daniella.

A postscript reveals the boys' future achievements: Lupe becomes a Marine for 30 years; Felipe plays professional golf and earns a business degree; Mario becomes a PGA caddie; Gene becomes a high school teacher; Joe becomes a civil servant. J.B. remains a superintendent and coach until his death in 1986. The team is inducted into the Latino International Sports Hall of Fame, and their record remains unbroken for 36 years.

== Cast ==
- Jay Hernandez as JB Peña
- Dennis Quaid as Frank Mitchell
- Cheech Marin as Pollo
- Julian Works as Joe Treviño
- Jaina Lee Ortiz as Lucy Peña
- Brett Cullen as Judge Milton Cox
- Oscar Nuñez as Principal Guerra
- Paulina Chávez as Daniela Torres
- Gregory Diaz IV as Gene Vasquez
- Miguel Angel Garcia as Felipe Romero
- Christian Gallegos as Mario Lomas
- José Julián as Lupe Felan
- Gillian Vigman as Gayle Baker
- Richard Robichaux as Don Glenn
- Jimmy Gonzalez as Adelio Treviño
- Michael Southworth as Tim Cox
- Mykle McCoslin as Margaret Cox
- Heather Kafka as Alice Glenn

== Production ==
In June 2022, it was announced that Jay Hernandez, Jaina Lee Ortiz, Dennis Quaid, and Julian Works would star in the film. Hernandez is also one of the executive producers along with Mexican boxer Canelo Álvarez. Filming began in May 2022, and took place in Smithville, Texas and in Colombia.

== Release ==
The Long Game premiered at the 2023 South by Southwest Film & TV Festival on March 12, 2023, winning the Narrative Spotlight Audience Award. It was theatrically released by Mucho Mas Media on April 12, 2024. The movie made its streaming debut on Netflix in the United States on July 12, 2024.

== Reception ==
On the review aggregator website Rotten Tomatoes, 82% of 33 critics' reviews are positive, with an average rating of 6.4/10. The website's consensus reads: "An appealing underdog story based on an uplifting true story, The Long Game represents a triumph of sheer heart over well-worn narrative formula." Metacritic, which uses a weighted average, assigned the film a score of 65 out of 100, based on 5 critics, indicating "generally favorable" reviews.

Brian Tallerico of RogerEbert.com gave the film a positive review and wrote that it "transcends its clichés by being true to its characters and artistic in its approach." Sheri Linden of The Hollywood Reporter also gave the film a positive review and wrote, "Could have used more topspin, but a winning round nonetheless." Therese Lacson of Collider graded the film a C and wrote, "The Long Game isn't awful, it's perfectly serviceable as a sports flick about an inspiring all-American team, but that's all that it is: it's fine. There's little to write home about and it feels like a case of unfulfilled potential."
