= The Last Kiss (2026 film) =

2026 horror film by Yoko Okumura

- Promotional release poster
- Directed by: Yoko Okumura
- Written by: Yoko Okumura; Krystal Houghton Ziv; Alon Ziv
- Produced by: Jason Blum; James DeMonaco; Michael Fimognari; Sébastien K. Lemercier
- Starring: Mckenna Grace; Arkira Chantaratananond; Jaden Michael; Riley Davis
- Cinematography: Michael Fimognari
- Edited by: Michael Block
- Music by: Tangelene Bolton
- Production companies: Blumhouse Atomic Monster; Man in a Tree
- Distributed by: Universal Pictures Home Entertainment
- Release date: September 15, 2026
- Running time: 97 minutes
- Country: United States
- Language: English

The Last Kiss is a 2026 American slasher film directed by Yoko Okumura and written by Okumura, Krystal Houghton Ziv and Alon Ziv. The film stars Mckenna Grace, Arkira Chantaratananond, Jaden Michael, and Riley Davis. Jason Blum and James DeMonaco serve as producers through their Blumhouse Atomic Monster and Man in a Tree banners, respectively.

It was released digitally on September 15, 2026, by Universal Pictures Home Entertainment.

== Plot ==
High school student Laurel Hansen, her best friend Poppy Yang, and their classmates take a field trip to a park on Valentine's Day. The bridge the group stands on collapses, sending several students, including Park Ranger Pauline and parent chaperone Shannon, into the water below. They make it out of the water, and Laurel kisses her crush Leo, only to discover that he had been killed after being impaled by a wooden stake.

One year later, Laurel is no longer friends with Poppy and deals with anxiety from the incident and visions of her mother, Diane, dying in a house fire. Laurel begins dating her classmate Evan, whom she reconnected with after returning to school. One night, Laurel kisses Evan and has a vision of him and another classmate, Chuck, being stabbed to death. She tries to warn Randy Yang, the school principal and Poppy's father, but is dismissed. Diane cautions Laurel that she may be returned to Brookside, the mental hospital where she stayed after the accident.

Laurel attempts to solve the murder before it happens and reconciles with Poppy, who is now dating Shannon's son, Tyler. To convince Poppy of her power, Laurel kisses her, during which she sees Poppy dying of old age after saying the same words Diane does in her premonition. Laurel eliminates two other classmates named Zolly and Bree as suspects, but Evan ends their relationship after seeing Laurel kiss one of them. Laurel turns her attention to Paulie, tracking her to a local conservatory. Laurel finds Paulie hanging and gives her mouth-to-mouth. She has a vision of Pauline being hanged by the killer moments before she arrived. Pauline’s death is ruled a suicide, but Laurel realizes that the killings will take place at the conservatory during an upcoming school dance.

Laurel concludes that Leo's brother, Noah, is the killer, targeting the bridge incident's survivors as revenge. She marks Noah's shoe to prove her theory, but is framed for Pauline's murder, speculating that Principal Yang did so. Laurel breaks into the Yangs' home to kiss Randy but is interrupted by Poppy, who begins to doubt Laurel's visions. The following morning, Laurel kisses Evan and sees Noah's marked shoes in the vision. However, Diane arrives to take Laurel back to Brookside. There, she encounters Shannon, who has suffered a psychotic break since the accident. Laurel suddenly realizes that Tyler is the killer, recognizing a bag he is holding in a photo in Shannon's room. She escapes Brookside and drives to the dance, where Tyler prepares for his murders, planning to frame Noah for the crime.

Laurel runs to the forest near the conservatory, where she finds an injured Bree and Chuck. She performs first aid but is interrupted by Evan, who followed her into the forest. Tyler suddenly attacks, explaining to Laurel that he has nothing to live for, as he is forced to take care of his mother instead of going to college. Laurel kisses him, receiving a vision of a hidden knife on Tyler’s ankle, which she grabs and stabs him to death before passing out. Laurel returns to school with all of Tyler’s planned victims still alive. She shares a kiss with Evan and is relieved to find that her visions have stopped.

== Cast ==
- Mckenna Grace as Laurel Hansen, the girl who has the power to see who dies whenever she kisses someone.
- Arkira Chantaratananond as Poppy Yang, Laurel's best friend and Randy's daughter.
- Jaden Michael as Evan Geller, a classmate who likes Laurel and later became her boyfriend.
- Riley Davis as Tyler McKinley, Poppy's boyfriend, Shannon's son, and later the true serial killer.
- Kate Drummond as Diane Hansen, Laurel's single mother.
- Samantha Espie as Ranger Pauline, the park ranger and a botanist who gets killed.
- Cooper Levy as Chuck Beasley, Laurel's classmate and a dumb jock.
- Eve Edwards as Bree Williams, Evan's friend and Chuck's date for the Valentine's Dance.
- Stephanie Moore as Shannon McKinley, Tyler's mother who was sent to a mental institute after the incident.
- Joseph Chiu as Leo Brock, Laurel's former crush who dies after the bridge collapsed which is when Laurel tries to kiss him.
- Ash Lee as Principal Randy Yang, Poppy's widowed father.
- Bergman Freemdan as Noah Brock, Leo's brother who feels sorry for Laurel.
- Jorel Hoffert as Zolly Peppercorn, a classmate who Laurel kisses to see a vision of him dying from eating too much junk food.

== Production ==
In July 2024, it was announced that Yoko Okumura was set to write and direct the film originally titled Kiss of Death, with Jason Blum producing through his Blumhouse Productions banner. Principal photography started on October 16, 2024 in Toronto, Ontario, Canada. In April 2025, it was revealed that Mckenna Grace would be starring as the lead in the film. In September 2026, it was announced that Tangelene Bolton would be composing the score.

== Release ==
The Last Kiss was released digitally on September 15, 2026, by Universal Pictures Home Entertainment.
