= Launchpad (TV series) =

American short film anthology television series

- Created by: Walt Disney Pictures
- Original work: American Eid (2021)
- Owners: Disney Television Studios; Walt Disney Studios (The Walt Disney Company through Disney Entertainment)
- Years: 2021–present

Films and television
- Short film(s): Season 1: American Eid (2021); Dinner is Served (2021); Growing Fangs (2021); The Last of the Chupacabras (2021); Let's Be Tigers (2021); The Little Prince(ss) (2021); Season 2: Beautiful, FL (2023); Black Belts (2023); The Ghost (2023); Maxine (2023); Project CC (2023); The Roof (2023)

Audio
- Soundtrack(s): See below

Miscellaneous
- Distributed by: Disney+ Walt Disney Studios Motion Pictures

Launchpad is an anthology series of American independent short films produced by Walt Disney Pictures and distributed by Walt Disney Studios Motion Pictures for streaming on Disney+. The films are created by various filmmakers from diverse and underrepresented racial, social, and cultural backgrounds.

Submissions for Launchpad began in June 2019 and the final round of filmmakers were selected by Disney in December 2019, from a pool of 1,000 applicants. Disney financed the films and allowed the filmmakers to mentor with creative executives from various Walt Disney Studios film divisions, as well as the opportunity to receive educational classes provided by the American Film Institute. The first season was centered on the theme of "discover", which the participants were instructed to create stories around. Development process began in February 2020, but production on the first season of films was delayed due to the ongoing COVID-19 pandemic.

American Eid, Dinner Is Served, Growing Fangs, The Last of the Chupacabras, Let's Be Tigers, and The Little Prince(ss), the six films of the first season of Launchpad, were released on Disney+ on May 28, 2021. The series has received praise for showcasing diversity and themes of inclusivity not typically addressed in mainstream Hollywood productions. A second season, focusing on the theme of "connection", was released on Disney+ on September 29, 2023, containing the films Beautiful, FL, Black Belts, Maxine, Project CC, The Ghost and The Roof. Some of the films from both seasons also screened at film festivals such as the Palm Springs International Film Festival, Asian American International Film Festival, Los Angeles Asian Pacific Film Festival and HollyShorts Film Festival prior to being released to the public on the platform.

== Films ==
=== Season 1 (2021) ===
Film	Release date	Director(s)	Writer(s)		Producer(s)	Executive producer(s)	Editor(s)	Composer(s)
Film	Release date	Director(s)	Screenplay	Story	Producer(s)	Executive producer(s)	Editor(s)	Composer(s)
American Eid	May 28, 2021	Aqsa Altaf	Aqsa Altaf		Leslie Owen, Steak House	Julie Ann Crommett, Mahin Ibrahim, Alyssa Navarro, Chris Caraballo, Jason Alvidrez, Adam Nusinow, Mary Coleman, Nicole Grindle, Vanessa Morrison	Nick Houy	Siddhartha Khosla
Dinner Is Served	May 28, 2021	Hao Zheng	G. Wilson & Hao Zheng		David Lally	Julie Ann Crommett, Mahin Ibrahim, Alyssa Navarro, Chris Caraballo, Jason Alvidrez, Adam Nusinow, Jessica Virtue, Rachel Yeung	Matt Friedman	Xue Ran Chen
Growing Fangs	May 28, 2021	Ann Marie Pace	Ann Marie Pace		Genevieve Faye, Melody Sandoval, Steak House	Julie Ann Crommett, Mahin Ibrahim, Alyssa Navarro, Chris Caraballo, Jason Alvidrez, Adam Nusinow, Osnat Shurer, Halima Hudson		Adrianne Gonzalez
The Last of the Chupacabras	May 28, 2021	Jessica Mendez Siqueiros	Jessica Mendez Siqueiros		Nicole Crespo, Steak House	Julie Ann Crommett, Mahin Ibrahim, Alyssa Navarro, Chris Caraballo, Jason Alvidrez, Adam Nusinow	Hector Padilla	Renee Goust
Let's Be Tigers	May 28, 2021	Stefanie Abel Horowitz	Stefanie Abel Horowitz		Sydney Fleischmann, Steak House	Julie Ann Crommett, Mahin Ibrahim, Alyssa Navarro, Chris Caraballo, Jason Alvidrez, Adam Nusinow, Grant Curtis	Stephanie Kaznocha	Tangelene Bolton
The Little Prince(ss)	May 28, 2021	Moxie Peng	Moxie Peng		Carver Diserens, Steak House	Julie Ann Crommett, Mahin Ibrahim, Alyssa Navarro, Chris Caraballo, Jason Alvidrez, Adam Nusinow, Sarah Shepard, Karen Chau	Shayar Bhansali	Lia Ouyang Rusli

==== American Eid ====
Sisters Ameena and Zainab, two Muslim Pakistani immigrants, process the difficulties of living in a new place, including the lack of awareness their school has for their holiday of Eid.

==== Dinner Is Served ====
A Chinese student attending an American boarding school tries out for a leadership position never attained by an international student.

==== Growing Fangs ====
Val Garcia, a Mexican-American teen who is half human/half vampire, maintains her identity a secret from both worlds, until her human best friend shows up at her monster-infested school.

==== The Last of the Chupacabras ====
A lonely Mexican-American woman struggling to carry on her traditions unknowingly summons a dark and ancient creature known as a chupacabra.

==== Let's Be Tigers ====
Avalon, a grief-stricken young woman who has recently lost her mother, is tasked to babysit a young boy named Noah for an evening.

==== The Little Prince(ss) ====
Two young Chinese boys, Gabriel and Rob, befriend each other. Rob's father becomes suspicious about Gabriel's feminine behavior and love of ballet and decides to intervene.

=== Season 2 (2023) ===
Film	Release date	Director(s)	Writer(s)		Producer(s)	Executive producer(s)	Editor(s)	Composer(s)
Film	Release date	Director(s)	Screenplay	Story	Producer(s)	Executive producer(s)	Editor(s)	Composer(s)
Beautiful, FL	September 29, 2023	Gabriela Ortega	Adrian Ferbeyre, Joel Perez		Phillip Yaw Domfeh, Helena Sardinha	Lissa Khoshbakhti, Andrew Reyes	Helena Rodriguez	Rene G. Boscio
Black Belts	September 29, 2023	Spencer Glover	Xavier Stiles, Spencer Glover		Mychal Guyton, Phillip Yaw Domfeh	Lissa Khoshbakhti, Mahin Ibrahim, Katherine Sarafian, Emily Mollenkopf, Andy Keeter, Jason Alvidrez, Adam Nusinow, Carlo Fiorio, Katie Cordero	Alex Ivany	Ambrose Akinmusire
The Ghost	September 29, 2023	Erica Eng	Kevin Jihyek Park		Kelly Rutta, Phillip Yaw Domfeh			Jessica Rae Huber
Maxine	September 29, 2023	Niki Ang	Niki Ang		Andrew Ahn, Phillip Yaw Domfeh		Rylan Rafferty	Carla Patullo
Project CC	September 29, 2023	Cashmere Jasmine	Jasmine Johnson		Nicole Crespo, Phillip Yaw Domfeh			EmmoLei Sankofa
The Roof	September 29, 2023	Alexander Bocchieri	W.A.W. Parker		Blake Pickens, Phillip Yaw Domfeh		Reynolds Barney	

==== Beautiful, FL ====
Teen girl Omara (Dariana Alvarez) scrambles to get spare parts from her eclectic trailer park neighbors and fix the family RV in time to share her tia abuela's special flavor in the Annual Beautiful, FL Ice Cream Competition.

==== Black Belts ====
KJ is an offbeat middle schooler and martial arts movie nerd from Compton, when he challenges the top dojos in South LA and wears his Uncle's old Black Belt, his former fighter Dad gets too involved and both learn there's more to life than keeping your guard up.

==== The Ghost ====
12-year-old Clarice Cheung feels like she's invisible in her family - especially next to her older sister Naomi. But when a powerful ghost appears in their house, the estranged sisters will have to team up and stop it before their family is torn apart forever.

==== Maxine ====
Anxious about introducing her first girlfriend to her family, a queer Asian American teen gets help from the spirit of her long-lost relative during the Hungry Ghost Festival.

==== Project CC ====
When tragedy strikes, a young scientist decides to clone her best friend, but accidentally clones the family dog instead. Now, with the help of her older sister, the girls must turn several dogs back into one before their parents come home.

==== The Roof ====
After being sent to stay with his great-grandfather, a Cheyenne teen uncovers a connection to his family and community in a way he never thought possible.

== Music ==
=== Season 1 (2021) ===
Title	U.S. release date	Composer(s)	Label
American Eid (Original Motion Picture Soundtrack)	June 2, 2021	Siddhartha Khosla	Walt Disney Records
Dinner is Served (Original Motion Picture Soundtrack)	June 2, 2021	Xue Ran Chen	Walt Disney Records
Growing Fangs (Original Motion Picture Soundtrack)	June 2, 2021	AG	Walt Disney Records
The Last of the Chupacabras (Original Motion Picture Soundtrack)	June 2, 2021	Renee Goust	Walt Disney Records
Let's Be Tigers (Original Motion Picture Soundtrack)	June 2, 2021	Tangelene Bolton	Walt Disney Records
The Little Prince(ss) (Original Motion Picture Soundtrack)	June 2, 2021	Lia Ouyang Rusli	Walt Disney Records

== Reception ==
=== Critical reception ===
Kristen Yoonsoo Kim of The New York Times praised the series for approaching underrepresented groups of people across short films that are also made by minority filmmakers, found some of the shorts to be charming and sincere, while complimenting the dark tone of other films, stating they engage with somber stories and do not provide a predictable happy ending. Jade Budowski of Decider found the short film Dinner Is Served impressively moving and praised the performances of the cast members, while stating the other films still manage to provide stories that are delightful and essential from fresh perspectives.

Ashley Moulton of Common Sense Media rated the series 4 out of 5 stars, acclaimed the presence of positives messages, citing self-authenticity and pride, and praised the presence of role models, stating the series highlights underrepresented groups, while complimenting the educational value for its depiction of different cultures. Josh Spiegel of SlashFilm rated the anthology series 8 out of 10, found that each short manages to have a distinct identity across the series, complimented the filmmakers for providing thoughtful and dark stories, and hoped the series to get a second season with new stories that stays both different and unexpected.

=== Accolades ===
The series was nominated for Outstanding Short-Form Series - Comedy or Drama at the 2022 NAACP Image Awards. The Little Prince(ss) was nominated for Best Live Action Short at the 2022 Gold List Awards.
