= Spencer Sutherland =

American singer-songwriter (born 1992)

- Born: August 31, 1992 (age 33); Pickerington, Ohio, U.S.
- Occupation: Singer-songwriter
- Years active: 2013–present
- Musical career
- Genres: Pop; R&B; blue-eyed soul; Glam rock
- Labels: NEC Records; BMG
- Website: spencersutherland.com

Spencer Sutherland is an American indie pop singer, songwriter, and actor from Pickerington adjacent to Columbus, Ohio.

== Background ==
In June 2017, Sutherland was picked as Elvis Duran's Artist of the Month and appeared on NBC's Today show with Hoda Kotb and Kathie Lee Gifford performing his hit "Selfish" live on the program. It was his national television debut.

His single "Selfish", released in February 2017 had over 4 million streams on Apple Music. Sutherland also co-wrote songs on Timeflies' new EP. In April 2018, he received his first major movie song placement in Honey: Rise Up and Dance with the song "Work You Out". Sutherland was a contestant on the UK version of The X Factor in 2017 and made it through to the Live Shows and was mentored by Louis Walsh in the Boys category. He sang Marvin Gaye's "Let's Get It On" in his initial audition, and James Arthur's "Say You Won't Let Go" in the group performance. After performing "Who You Are" in the first live show, he was sent home.

In 2018, Sutherland released three singles: "Talk", "Tell Me" and "Fine". On September 9 of the same year, Sutherland joined alongside JAGMAC to open for the boy band In Real Life on their Tonight Belongs to You Tour across the United States. In October 2018, he signed with BMG US. He had his first major tour spanning from September to November 2018. Sutherland announced his first headlining tour, the Freaking Out Tour, on June 11, 2019. The tour was from August 7, 2019, to August 28, 2019, with Justice Carradine as an opening act.

In 2019, Sutherland released three singles: "Sweater", "None of This Has Been About You", and "Freaking Out". He released his debut EP, None of This Has Been About You, on March 15, 2019. In December 2020, he released his sophomore EP, Indigo, with major playlist positioning for single "Wonder".

== Acting work ==
In 2021, Sutherland made the move to acting and had a part in the Netflix movie Afterlife of the Party starring Victoria Justice, with whom he dueted for the song "Home." It was used for the closing credits of the movie. Midori Francis also was in the movie. Along with "Home", he had three other song placements. In October 2021, he was a guest star on the Amazon series I Know What You Did Last Summer. From November 9–24, he was on the What a Shame Tour.

During 2022, Sutherland was the opening act for Big Time Rush during their Forever Tour. In July 2022, the single "Everybody" was released. He announced his debut album In His Mania via social media on February 10, 2023. It was released on March 10 and was followed by the In His Mania US tour. During the tour, artists Dylan Conrique, Jordy, Cloe Wilder, and Michael Minelli were the opening acts. Conrique and Wilder primarily supported Sutherland in the first half of his tour while Jordy and Minelli were openers for the second half. On May 2, 2024, after teasing it for a while, Sutherland released the song "Alive", which was the lead single of his second album. He released "Let Me Loose" a month later. On August 5, he announced a second album, a modern rock opera titled, The Drama, which was released on October 4. He released "Drama" on the same day the album was announced.

Sutherland has largely kept his personal life private. However, on March 27, 2025 in Columbus, Ohio, Sutherland was joined on stage by his brother Thomas who played the banjo.

Beginning on September 15, 2026, Sutherland is set to make his Broadway debut as Romeo in & Juliet.

== Discography ==
=== Singles ===
- 2013: "Everything Has Changed" (by Stefanie Scott featuring Spencer Sutherland)
- 2013: "Heartstrings"
- 2015: "Bad Influence"
- 2016: "Girls"
- 2017: "Selfish"
- 2018: "Talk"
- 2018: "Tell Me"
- 2018: "Fine"
- 2019: "Sweater"
- 2019: "None of This Has Been About You"
- 2019: "Freaking Out"
- 2019: "Grateful"
- 2020: "Help"
- 2020: "Too many friends"
- 2020: "Wonder"
- 2020: "Indigo"
- 2021: "Shame"
- 2021: "Paranoia"
- 2021: "Lemons"
- 2022: "Everybody"
- 2022: "Flower"
- 2022: "Out Of Love"
- 2023: "Chicken Little" (featuring Meghan Trainor)
- 2024: "Alive"
- 2024: "Let Me Loose"
- 2024: "Drama"
- 2024: "Hater"

=== EPs ===
- 2019: None of This Has Been About You
- 2020: Indigo
- 2021: Afterlife of the Party (Music from the Netflix Film)

=== Albums ===
- 2023: In His Mania
- 2024: The Drama

== Tours ==
=== The In His Mania Tour ===
Date	City	Venue
19 March 2023	San Francisco	The Chapel
21 March 2023	Santa Ana, California	Constellation Room
23 March 2023	San Diego	Voodoo Room HOB
24 March 2023	Phoenix	Crescent Ballroom
30 March 2023	Austin	Antone's Nightclub
1 April 2023	Houston	Bronze Peacock HOB
2 April 2023	Dallas	Cambridge Room HOB
4 April 2023	St. Louis	Delmar Hall
5 April 2023	Kansas City	Madrid Theatre
7 April 2023	Saint Paul	Amsterdam Bar & Hall
8 April 2023	Chicago	House of Blues
10 April 2023	Indianapolis	Old National Centre
11 April 2023	Detroit	Shelter
12 April 2023	Columbus, Ohio	The Bluestone
14 April 2023	New York City	Irving Plaza
15 April 2023	Boston	Brighton Music Hall
17 April 2023	Washington D.C.	Union Stage
18 April 2023	Philadelphia	The Fillmore Philadelphia
20 April 2023	Nashville	Basement East
21 April 2023	Atlanta	The Masquerade
24 April 2023	Denver	Marquis Theater
25 April 2023	Salt Lake City	The Complex
27 April 2023	Los Angeles	The Belasco

== Filmography ==
=== Television ===
Year	Title	Role	Notes
2017	Still the King	Young Vernon	1 episode
2020	RomComPods	Lincoln Davis	7 episodes - podcast series
2021	I Know What You Did Last Summer	Dale	4 episodes

=== Film ===
Year	Title	Role	Notes
2021	Afterlife of the Party	Koop	Film debut

=== Theater ===
Year	Title	Role	Notes
2026	& Juliet	Romeo	Broadway debut
