= Yoko Okumura =

American director

- Born: December 9, 1987 (age 38); Kyoto, Japan
- Occupations: Director, Writer, Filmmaker
- Years active: 2005-present
- Notable work: The Bold Type, Good Trouble, Unseen
- Website: yokookumura.com

Yoko Okumura (born December 9, 1987) is a Japanese-American filmmaker. She is best known for directing the horror films Unseen (2023) and The Last Kiss (2026).

== Biography ==
Okumura was born in a Buddhist temple in Japan, and was raised in Minneapolis, Minnesota.

She attended both CalArts and American Film Institute, whilst at the latter, her student short film, "Kimi Kabuki" won multiple awards, including a DGA Student Film Award and got her an agent and manager.

Yoko is the daughter of Soto Zen priest Shohaku Okumura.

== Career ==
Okumura began her filmmaking career directing episodes for the television series 50 States of Fright, The Bold Type and Good Trouble.

In 2023, she made her directorial debut with the horror thriller film Unseen, starring Midori Francis, Jolene Purdy, and Missi Pyle. Jason Blum serves as an executive producer through his Blumhouse Television banner. It was released on March 7, 2023 by Paramount Home Entertainment and MGM+.

In 2026, she co-wrote and directed the slasher horror film The Last Kiss, starring Mckenna Grace, Arkira Chantaratananond, and Jaden Michael. Jason Blum and James DeMonaco serve as producers through their Blumhouse Atomic Monster and Man in a Tree banners, respectively. It was released digitally on September 15, 2026 by Universal Pictures Home Entertainment.

== Filmography ==
TV series

Year	Title	Notes	Ref.
2020	50 States of Fright	Episode "America's Largest Ball of Twine (Kansas)"	
2021	The Bold Type	2 episodes	
2021-2022	Good Trouble	2 episodes	

Feature film

Year	Title	Director	Writer	Ref.
2023	Unseen	Yes	No	
2026	The Last Kiss	Yes	Yes	
