= The Better Angels (film) =

- Film poster
- Directed by: A. J. Edwards
- Written by: A. J. Edwards
- Produced by: Terrence Malick; Nicolas Gonda; Jake DeVito; Charley Beil
- Starring: Jason Clarke; Diane Kruger; Brit Marling; Wes Bentley
- Cinematography: Matthew J. Lloyd
- Edited by: Alex Milan
- Music by: Hanan Townshend
- Production company: Brothers K Productions
- Distributed by: Amplify
- Release dates: January 18, 2014 (Sundance); November 7, 2014 (United States)
- Running time: 95 minutes
- Country: United States
- Language: English

The Better Angels is a 2014 American biographical historical drama film about United States President Abraham Lincoln's formative years. It was written and directed by A. J. Edwards and produced by Terrence Malick.

The film had its premiere at 2014 Sundance Film Festival on January 18, 2014. It was subsequently screened in the Panorama program at the 64th Berlin International Film Festival on February 8, 2014.

In March 2014, Amplify acquired distribution rights to the film. It was released on November 7, 2014.

== Synopsis and background ==
This film serves as a story of Abraham Lincoln's childhood, his upbringing in Indiana, and the hardships and tragedies that made him the man he was. Lincoln lived more than thirteen years in Indiana, but the film focuses on his life from ages eight to eleven or twelve (years 1817 to 1821), and explores Lincoln's relationships between Lincoln and his birth mother and his stepmother. Lincoln historian and scholar William Bartelt served as a historical consultant for the film with Bartelt's 2008 book There I Grew Up: Remembering Abraham Lincoln's Indiana Youth providing substantial inspiration to the filmmakers. The title of the film, "The Better Angels," is borrowed from the final words of Abraham Lincoln's first inaugural address, "the better angels of our nature."

== Cast ==
- Diane Kruger as Sarah Lincoln
- Jason Clarke as Thomas Lincoln
- Brit Marling as Nancy Lincoln
- Wes Bentley as Mr. Crawford
- Braydon Denney as Abe
- Cameron Mitchell Williams as Dennis Hanks

== Reception ==
The Better Angels received mixed reviews from critics. Todd McCarthy of The Hollywood Reporter gave the film a positive review, saying it's "a beautiful, arty, very Malick-influenced evocation of Abraham Lincoln's childhood." Katie Hasty of HitFix praised the film by saying it is "a lushly conceived, exhaustively realized debut feature that'd be pretty formidable stuff coming from a more practised filmmaker — and derided in some quarters as a self-impressed knock-off." Rodrigo Perez in his Indiewire review said the movie focuses "on mood, nature, divinity and celestial atmosphere" rather than story.

Review aggregation website Rotten Tomatoes gives the film an approval rating of 44%, based on reviews from 48 critics with an average score of 5.88/10. The website's critics' consensus reads: "Malick-inspired but not as inspired as Malick, The Better Angels muffles an interesting idea under ponderous execution." On Metacritic, the film has a weighted average of 53 out of 100, based on 23 critics, indicating "mixed or average reviews".

== See also ==
- Early life and career of Abraham Lincoln
