= The Vessel (film) =

- Theatrical release poster
- Directed by: Julio Quintana
- Written by: Julio Quintana
- Produced by: Marla Quintana
- Cinematography: Santiago Benet Mari
- Music by: Hanan Townshend
- Production company: Outsider Pictures
- Release date: September 16, 2016 (United States)
- Running time: 86 minutes

The Vessel is a 2016 film starring Martin Sheen. Cuban American filmmaker Julio Quintana wrote and directed and his brother Lucas Quintana stars alongside Sheen. Terrence Malick was an executive producer on the film. The movie was filmed in English and Spanish, with each speaking scene shot in both languages, using a Puerto Rican bilingual cast. The film was shot primarily in La Perla, San Juan, Puerto Rico.

== Synopsis ==
Ten years after a tsunami destroyed a small-town elementary school with all the children inside, a young man who was dead in a drowning (not in the tsunami, but a separate event) for three hours and then came back to life builds a mysterious structure out of the school's remains, setting the town aflame with passions long forgotten.

== Cast ==
- Martin Sheen as Father Douglas
- Luis Quintana as Leo
- Jacqueline Duprey as Fidelia
- Aris Mejias as Soraya
- Eugenio Monclova as the deacon

== Release ==
The film was released in the U.S. on September 16, 2016. It was later released on Blu-ray and a 2-disc DVD on January 24, 2017; both releases containing both the English and Spanish versions of the film.

== Reception ==
The review aggregator website Rotten Tomatoes reported a 67% approval rating, with an average rating of 5.95/10 based on 18 reviews. Metacritic, which uses a weighted average, assigned the film a score of 67 out of 100, based on 8 critics, indicating "generally favorable" reviews.

Film critic Frank Scheck called the movie "gorgeous, dreamlike style and Infused with heavy doses of mysticism and allegory."
