= Vampires vs. the Bronx =

American comedy horror film

- Official release poster
- Directed by: Oz Rodriguez
- Screenplay by: Oz Rodriguez; Blaise Hemingway
- Story by: Oz Rodriguez
- Produced by: Lorne Michaels; Erin David; Bert Hamelinck; Michael Sagol
- Starring: Jaden Michael; Gerald W. Jones III; Gregory Diaz IV; Sarah Gadon
- Cinematography: Blake McClure
- Edited by: Alex O'Flinn; Sara Shaw
- Music by: Will Blair; Brooke Blair
- Production companies: Universal Pictures; Broadway Video; Caviar
- Distributed by: Netflix
- Release date: October 2, 2020
- Running time: 86 minutes
- Country: United States
- Language: English

Vampires vs. the Bronx is a 2020 American comedy black horror film directed by Oz Rodriguez and written by Rodriguez and Blaise Hemingway. The film follows a group of teenagers who are forced to protect their neighborhood in the Bronx when a gathering of vampires invades. It stars Jaden Michael, Gerald W. Jones III, Gregory Diaz IV, Sarah Gadon, Method Man, Shea Whigham, and Coco Jones.

It was released on October 2, 2020, by Netflix to highly positive reviews. Although the movie is considered a comedy and a Black horror, it has elements of social satire, especially in the fact that the movie contains commentary on the gentrification of communities.

== Plot ==
While getting her nails done in the Bronx, new resident Vivian learns from salon owner Becky that Becky will be selling her salon to real estate group Murnau Properties, who have been buying up land all over the neighborhood. After Vivian leaves, Murnau broker Frank Polidori comes in to finalize the sale, and watches as a vampire kills Becky.

Miguel Martinez is organizing a block party to raise money to save the Primo bodega, a local corner store owned by Tony that is under threat of closing. He is joined by best friends Bobby and Luis; the three grew up in the bodega. Miguel expresses concern that the neighborhood is being gentrified. As he is later hanging up posters in front of a courthouse purchased by Murnau, he sees men watching him, and is chased by Slim, a member of Henny's gang; Slim is killed by one of the men. Miguel flees to Tony's and hides with Bobby and Luis. The vampire enters looking for him, and the three notice that he does not appear in any of the mirrors.

The next day, they watch Blade and go over everything they know about killing vampires. They visit a Murnau Properties office to attempt to find where the vampires rest during the daylight; Frank threatens them, stating that being from the Bronx, they could vanish and no one would notice. The boys grab a file from his desk and escape. They find a USB drive containing plans for vampire nests throughout the Bronx, as well as a key with a skeleton shape. They discover that the courthouse is the nest and break in. Miguel films himself opening a coffin, revealing a vampire, who chases them out. They are picked up by police for trespassing, and confronted by the Bronx residents. Miguel attempts to show everyone the video as proof, but is laughed at when it only shows him opening an empty coffin. He challenges Frank to step into the sunlight, but is dismayed when Frank does so and requests the stolen file back. Frank, who is revealed to be a human servant to the vampires, finds that Miguel has kept the key, and hires Henny and his gang to hunt down the trio.

Vivian visits the bodega to look for Miguel; Tony realizes that she too is a vampire and is killed by her. The boys see Tony's bodega boarded up by Murnau and realize he has been killed. Miguel takes Tony's prized Sammy Sosa bat and vows to kill the vampires. Henny and his gang attempt to rob the vampires, but are killed. The kids are pursued by vampires and escorted to Miguel's home by Vivian. They realize Vivian is a vampire and beg Miguel's mother not to invite her in, as vampires cannot enter without an invitation. Vivian reveals that she is the leader of the Murnau vampire coven, and demands the key back. Miguel splashes her with holy water and she flees. The next morning, the trio gathers supplies to defeat the coven. In the courthouse, they manage to kill several vampires. Vivian takes the key and reveals that it opens a box containing the remains of the first vampire, whose ashes can be used to grow their army. Bobby convinces Frank that the vampires will never see him as one of their own, and he lets them go before he is killed by Vivian. Vivian incapacitates them and is about to kill Miguel when the Bronx residents arrive with homemade weapons. The ensuing fight ends with Miguel stabbing Vivian with Tony's bat and killing her.

Two weeks later, Miguel passes by a mural in memorial of Tony on his way to the block party. He and his friends decide that they make good vampire-hunters. Resident Gloria films a livestream, warning future invaders that her community will always support each other.

== Cast ==
- Jaden Michael as Miguel Martinez
- Gerald W. Jones III as Bobby Carter
- Gregory Diaz IV as Luis Acosta
- Sarah Gadon as Vivian
- Imani Lewis as Gloria
- Cliff "Method Man" Smith as Father Jackson
- Shea Whigham as Frank Polidori
- Coco Jones as Rita
- Joel "The Kid Mero" Martinez as Tony
- Chris Redd as Andre
- Vladimir Caamaño as Papo
- Jeremie Harris as Henny
- Adam David Thompson as Alexis
- Judy Marte as Carmen Martinez
- Richard Bekins as Markus
- Zoe Saldana as Becky
- Socorro Santiago as Tia Maria

== Production ==
On August 14, 2018, it was announced that Broadway Video and Caviar had begun production on Vampires vs. the Bronx, a film written and directed by Osmany Rodriguez from Universal Pictures. Executive producers were expected to include Lorne Michaels, Erin David, Bert Hamelinck and Michael Sagol. Sarah Gadon, Chris Redd, The Kid Mero, Method Man, Shea Whigham, Vladimir Caamaño, Jaden Michael, Gregory Diaz IV, Gerald W. Jones III and Coco Jones were also announced to star in the film.

Principal photography for the film had reportedly already begun by August 2018.

== Release ==
In September 2020, Netflix acquired the distribution rights to the film from Universal Pictures. It was released on October 2, 2020.

== Reception ==
On Rotten Tomatoes, the film has an approval rating of 90% based on reviews from 41 critics, with an average rating of 6.9/10. The website's critics consensus reads, "In the sharp, socially conscious battle of Vampires vs. the Bronx, comedy and horror blend brilliantly – and the audience is the winner." On Metacritic, the film has a score of 76 out of 100 based on reviews from five critics, indicating "generally favorable reviews".

Nick Allen of RogerEbert.com gave it 3 out of 4 and wrote: "When a horror-comedy is as agile, charming, and funny as this, everybody wins." Felix Vasquez Jr. gave it a positive review, calling it "A fun, creepy, and exciting Halloween treat that completely side steps the hum drum Vampire narrative in favor [sic] something original and unique." Roger Moore of Movie Nation wrote: "Nobody should be making serious vampire or zombie movies at this stage of the horror cycle, so this riff on the genre absolutely fills the bill. And making it a commentary on gentrification? Inspired."
