= Dwight Global Online School =

Independent secondary school

Information
- Established: 2014
- Chancellor: Stephen Spahn
- Grades: 6-12
- Gender: Coeducational
- Enrollment: 358
- Accreditation: Cognia (education)
- Website: www.dwight.edu/dwight-global-online-school

Dwight Global Online School is an online independent school for students in sixth through twelfth grade. It is part of the Dwight Global Schools Network.

The original Dwight School was founded in Manhattan in 1872. In 2013, it was chosen to pilot an online IB education program that became Dwight Global Online School.

== Academics ==
Classes are a mix of synchronous and asynchronous elements, designed to suit a student body, including young athletes and actors, who want a rigorous education that is time-flexible.

Dwight Global is an IB World School and offers AP classes. Students choose to either focus on IB, AP, or a personalized course of study, meeting the same graduation standards as the students in the other Dwight schools. They graduate with a Dwight Global diploma and can pursue an IB diploma. They may come to the school's traditional campuses in New York City, Shanghai, Seoul, London, and Dubai for residential programs.

In 2021, Niche ranked Dwight Global the second-best online high school in the United States.

== Notable students and alumni ==
- Mathis Albert, '27, soccer player
- Rowan Blanchard, '19, actress
- Maximo Carrizo, '26, soccer player
- Lilla Crawford, '19, actress
- Christopher Cupps, '26, soccer player
- Gregory Diaz IV, '22, actor and singer
- Jaden Michael, '22, actor
- Yara Shahidi, '17, actress
- Cooper Williams, '23, tennis player
- Michael Zheng, '22, tennis player
