= Ren Hanami =

American actress

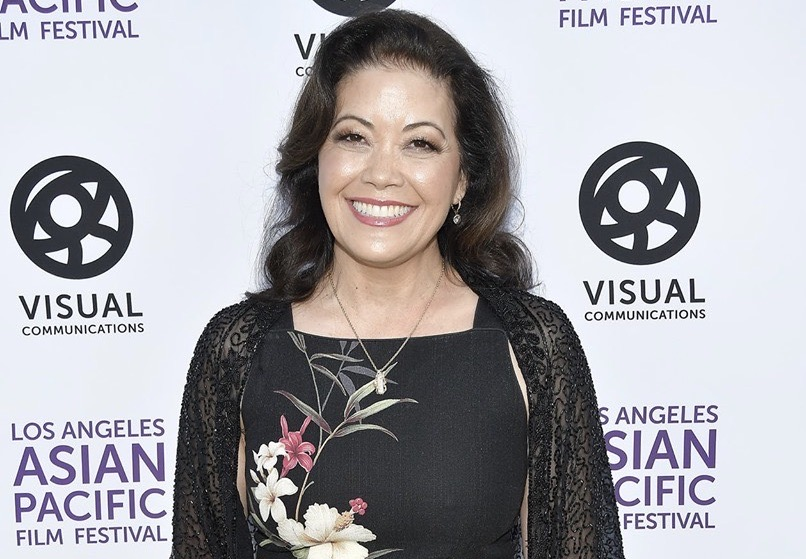
- Ren Hanami at Los Angeles Asian Pacific Film Festival
- Occupations: Actor, writer, director, singer

Ren Hanami is an American stage/screen/voice actress, writer, director and singer. Hanami is a recurring Guest Star on Disney's Bunk'd, and has appeared in TV shows such as Star Trek: Picard, Silicon Valley, This is Us, Criminal Minds and GLOW. Her first feature film role was Air Force One. She also appeared in the mini-series The Storm as Meteorologist Dawn Maleuga from Honolulu, Hawaii. She is the National Chairman of the SAG-AFTRA Asian Pacific American Media Committee and was inducted into the Asian Hall of Fame in 2021.

== Partial filmography ==
=== Television ===
Year	Series	Role
1987	The Bronx Zoo	Test Supervisor
1988	Thirtysomething	Nurse
1989	Tour of Duty	Whore #1 / Whore #2
1989	The Hogan Family	Floor Manager
1989-2006	The Young and the Restless	Bank Teller / Flight Attendant #1 / Ms. Lee
1990	On the Television	
1990	Knots Landing	Receptionist
1996	Profiler	Newscaster
2005	General Hospital	Dean Ryan / Kim Chan
2006	ER	NICU Nurse
2008	Grey's Anatomy	Ms. Chen
2008-present	AAA Hawai'i	Host
2009	Without a Trace	Neighbor
2009	The Storm	Dawn Maleuga
2011	Southland	Nurse
2011	Private Practice	Concierge
2016	Pretty Little Liars	Judge
2015-16	Silicon Valley	Lynn
2017	Angie Tribeca	Flag
2017	The Thundermans	Hula instructor
2017	Criminal Minds	Dr. Marion Rillo
2017	Major Crimes	Sister Antoinette
2017-2018	Here, Now	Moderator Lin
2017-2018	S.W.A.T.	Dr. Sari Fields
2018	Man with a Plan	Principal Hopwood
2018	GLOW	Joan Hannaford-Hobbs
2018	Shameless	Judge Manija Abbassi
2019	Santa Clarita Diet	Claire Randolph
2019	13 Reasons Why	Social worker
2020	Cherish the Day	Mean nun
2021	This Is Us	Dr. Salzman
2022	Star Trek: Picard	Director Lee
2022	Animal Kingdom	Phyllis
2022	Super Giant Robot Brothers	Magita Rose
2022	Cyberpunk: Edgerunners	Wakako Okada
2023	Bunk'd	Mavis
2023	Akuma Kun	Adelina (voice)
2025	The Bondsman	Aiko Kusatsu

=== Film ===
Year	Title	Role	Notes
1989	Love with a Twist	Mai	TV movie
1990	The Bakery	Female Newscaster	TV movie; as Linda Hanna
1992	Something to Live for: The Alison Gertz Story	Younger Nurse	TV movie
1994	One Woman's Courage	Newscaster	TV movie
1994	Cagney & Lacey: The Return	Margie	TV movie
1997	Air Force One	Reporter #4	
1998	Permanent Midnight	TV Host	
2010	Silent Shame	Self	Voice role
2017	Bitch	Family lawyer	
2017	Like Last Night	Frankee	Short film
2018	God's Not Dead: A Light in Darkness	Judge Gloria Pascual	
2021	Raya and the Last Dragon	Additional voices	
2022	Unseen	Mom	
2024	Orion and the Dark	Adult Sally	
2025	Grave of the Fireflies	Aunt	English dub

== Other work ==
=== Stage productions ===
- Land of Smiles - NGO Attorney, Achara Montri - Edinburgh Fringe Festival
- South Pacific - with Reba McEntire and Brian Stokes Mitchell - The Hollywood Bowl

=== Video games ===
- Cyberpunk 2077 - Wakako Okada

== Awards and nominations ==
Year	Award	Title	Result
2018	Best Supporting Actress in a Short Film	Like Last Night	Won
2018	Best Short Film Screenplay	Like Last Night	Won
2018	Best Family Short Film	Kimi Hanna: Fashionista Ninja "Lesson 23"	Won
2013	Best Supporting Actress in a Fan-Made Audio Drama	The Katniss Chronicles	Nominated

== Honors ==
- 2021 - Hanami is inducted into the Asian Hall of Fame "for her trailblazing career in the entertainment industry and advocacy for Asian Pacific Islander Americans through her work as the Chair of the SAG-AFTRA Asian Pacific Media Committee."
