= Vladimir Caamaño =

American comedian and actor

- Born: December 17, 1982 (age 43); The Bronx, New York City, U.S.
- Education: Wesleyan University
- Occupations: Comedian, actor
- Years active: 2009–present

Vladimir "Vlad" Caamaño (sometimes spelled Caamano) is an American comedian and actor.

== Career ==
Vladimir Caamaño was born in the Bronx to "a very traditional Dominican American family". His father was the superintendent to the building that he lived in. Much of Vlad's humor stems from his father and his personal life of which he tends to constantly mock in his stand up. He grew up in the Bronx and Washington Heights, Manhattan.

He graduated Wesleyan University and began to perform stand-up full-time at comedy clubs most notably The Stand Comedy Club, Gotham Comedy Club, Dangerfield's and Comic Strip Live. He signed with producers Adam Sztykiel and Bill Lawrence to create a pilot for a sitcom based around his personal life called A Bronx Life for NBC. The pilot was not picked up, but Vlad has expressed hope of it getting picked up by another network.

Vlad was named one of the ten funniest comedians to look for in 2016 by Variety. Howie Mandel chose Vlad as one of the "new faces" for his comedy gala. In 2019, he joined the cast of Tommy as series regular.

== Personal life ==
Prior to his comedic pivot, Vlad worked with high school students in NYC and briefly worked at a non-profit.

== Filmography ==
Year	Title	Role	Notes
2009	Stand-Up 360: Muy Caliente Edition 1	Himself	
2013–2015	Gotham Comedy Live	Himself	2 episodes
2014	Stand Up and Deliver	Himself	Guest
2015	The Unmovers	Vlad	Miniseries
2016	Just for Laughs Starring Howie Mandel	Himself	TV special
2016	Adam DeVine's House Party	Himself	Episode: "Weekend At Adam's"
2016	@midnight	Himself	Guest
2016	A Bronx Life	Vlad	TV Pilot; also writer and producer
2017	Tawk	Himself	Guest
2017	Jimmy Kimmel Live	Himself	Guest
2017	Brooklyn Nine-Nine	Phil	Episode: "Kicks"
2017–2019	Marvel's Runaways	Gene Hernandez	3 episodes
2018	Superstore	Alex	3 episodes
2018–present	Big City Greens	Juan Pablo (voice)	4 episodes
2019	Sophie's Quinceañera	Juan	Short film
2020	Tommy	Detective Abner Diaz	Main role, 12 episodes
2020–2022	Trolls: TrollsTopia	Synth (voice)	Main role, 10 episodes
2020	Vampires vs. the Bronx	Papo	
