= Blue Miracle (film) =

- Promotional poster
- Directed by: Julio Quintana
- Written by: Chris Dowling; Julio Quintana
- Produced by: Javier Chapa; Darren Moorman; Trey Reynolds; Ben Howard; Chris George
- Starring: Dennis Quaid; Jimmy Gonzales; Anthony Gonzalez; Dana Wheeler-Nicholson; Fernanda Urrejola; Bruce McGill; Miguel Angel Garcia
- Cinematography: Santiago Benet Mari
- Edited by: Sandra Adair
- Music by: Hanan Townshend
- Production companies: Mucho Mas Media; Reserve Entertainment; Redwood Ranch Productions; Third Coast Content; Provident Films; Endeavor Content
- Distributed by: Netflix
- Release date: May 27, 2021
- Running time: 95 minutes
- Country: United States
- Language: English

Blue Miracle is a 2021 American drama film directed by Julio Quintana from a screenplay by Quintana and Chris Dowling. The film stars Dennis Quaid, Jimmy Gonzales, Raymond Cruz, Anthony Gonzalez, Dana Wheeler-Nicholson, Fernanda Urrejola and Bruce McGill. It was released by Netflix on May 27, 2021.

Blue Miracle was nominated for the GMA Dove Award for Inspirational Film/Series of the Year at the 2022 GMA Dove Awards. and won the Epiphany Prize for Inspiring Movie at the 2022 MovieGuide Awards.

== Premise ==
To save their orphanage (Casa Hogar in Cabo), a guardian and his kids partner with a washed-up boat captain for a chance to win a cash prize at a fishing tournament.

== Cast ==
- Dennis Quaid as Captain Wade Malloy
- Raymond Cruz as Hector
- Anthony Gonzalez as "Geco"
- Jimmy Gonzales as Omar
- Dana Wheeler-Nicholson as Tricia Bisbee
- Fernanda Urrejola as Becca
- Bruce McGill as Wayne Bisbee
- Miguel Angel Garcia as "Moco"
- Isaac Arellanes as "Wiki"

== Production ==
Filming mostly took place in La Romana in the Dominican Republic, including at the Casa de Campo.

== Soundtrack ==
The film contains songs of the albums PANORAMA (GAWVI), Sin vergüenza and others produced by Reach Records.

1. Fight For Me (Blue Miracle Version) – GAWVI feat. Lecrae and Tommy Royale (3:22)
2. La Fiesta – Lecrae & Funky (3:32)
3. Qué Pasó – GAWVI (3:36)
4. Paradise – 1k Phew (3:21)
5. Ambiente – WHATUPRG & Tommy Royale (3:12)
6. Forty5 – GAWVI feat. Parris Chariz & Tommy Royale (4:03)
7. Mejor – Antonio Redes (3:04)
8. DICEN – GAWVI (3:51)
9. BUSO – Tommy Royale & Angie Rose (3:08)
10. NI AQUI – WHATUPRG (2:44)
11. TRAPCHATA – GAWVI (4:43)

== Reception ==
On review aggregator website Rotten Tomatoes, the film holds an approval rating of 68% based on 22 reviews, and an average rating of 5.8/10. The site's critics consensus reads: "Blue Miracle charts a familiar voyage, but viewers seeking an uplifting drama will be happily hooked on this fact-based film." On Metacritic, the film has a weighted average score of 48 out of 100 based on seven critics, indicating "mixed or average" reviews.

Benjamin Lee of The Guardian gave the film 3 out 5 stars, saying "It's the sort of old-fashioned string-puller that when done well is hard to resist even if we know the strings are being pulled, like we're aware of the bait but powerless to resist."
