= Maurice Greene =

Maurice Greene or Green may refer to:

- Maurice Greene (composer) (1696–1755), English composer and organist
- Maurice Greene (sprinter) (born 1974), American athlete
- Maurice Green (cricketer) (1900–1952), Guyanese cricketer
- Maurice Green (journalist) (1906–1987), English newspaper editor
- Maurice Green (photographer) (1931–2008), Anglo-Indian writer and photographer
- Maurice Green (virologist) (1926–2017) American virologist
- Maurice Greene (fighter) (born 1986), American MMA fighter
- Mo Green, American education official
