= Jimmy (2026 film) =

Biographical film by Aaron Burns

- Theatrical release poster
- Directed by: Aaron Burns
- Written by: Justin Strawhand
- Produced by: Aaron Burns; David C. Cook; Angela Galgani Sullivan; Jack McClintock; John Norton; Justin Strawhand
- Starring: KJ Apa; Max Casella; Kara Killmer; Rob Riggle; Julian Works; Sarah Drew; Christopher McDonald; Jen Lilley; Jemma Donovan; Neal McDonough; Jason Alexander
- Cinematography: James Mather
- Edited by: Stephen O'Connell
- Music by: Grant Fonda
- Production companies: Burns & Co. Entertainment
- Distributed by: Fathom Entertainment
- Release dates: October 8, 2026 (HFF); November 6, 2026 (United States)
- Running time: 120 minutes
- Country: United States
- Language: English
- Budget: $14 million
- Box office: $5 million

Jimmy is a 2026 American biographical drama film directed by Aaron Burns and written by Justin Strawhand about the life of Academy Award winning actor James "Jimmy" Stewart, starring KJ Apa in the title role. The film explores Stewart's military service and Hollywood career. Although not explicitly marketed as a Christian film, it has been discussed within the context of faith-based cinema and features religious themes, including Stewart's Presbyterian upbringing and relationship with his father.

The film was theatrically released in the United States on November 6, 2026. It received mixed reviews from critics.

== Plot ==
On February 27, 1941, James Stewart wins the Academy Award for Best Actor for his performance in The Philadelphia Story. The day after his Oscar win, Stewart receives a letter from the draft board, in which he is to report for military training. At MGM, Stewart informs Louis B. Mayer about the draft letter, who prompts to give him an "occupational deferement." However, Stewart is motivated to serve after his friend Frank Capra screens him newsreel footage of the ongoing Nazi invasion across Europe.

Stewart returns to his childhood home in Indiana, Pennsylvania, where his father Alexander, himself a war veteran, tries to persuade him not to serve. Regardless, Stewart enlists as a combat pilot in the U.S. Army Air Force. He arrives for training at Moffett Field, where he meets U.S. Army Colonel Terrill. There, Stewart appears in a short film, Winning Your Wings, to help recruit airmen.

In 1943, Stewart leaves to serve in the European theater, which will fly B-24s from RAF Tibenham as part of the 445th Operations Group over Europe. As the squadron's commanding officer, Stewart is warned that a German U-boat has been spotted over the Atlantic, which shoots down the low-flying "Sunflower Sue." Stewart continues flying on to his base, in England, concerned that lingering around the crash site will endanger the remaining aircraft in the formation. Subsequent search and rescue efforts fail to locate the fourteen man crew.

Haunted by his decision, after arriving at RAF Tibeham, Stewart struggles to write personal letters to console the families of those killed in action. He prays at a local church, where he meets Lady Julia Tyndall, an Englishwoman whose husband perished during the war. Stewart next leads the 703d Bomb Squadron to fly B-24s to successfully bomb a U-boat factory in Kiel, Germany. Afterwards, Stewart reconnects with Capra and begins dating Lady Julia.

Stewart leads the squadron on a combat mission over Nazi-occupied France, where they fight against the Luftwaffe in a vicious dogfight. Stewart's squadron incur heavy losses, which further traumatizes him. By December 1943, Stewart is promoted to Major. Back at RAF Tibenham, the air base is ambushed by Nazi planes, which destroys their aircraft and kills service members of Stewart's squadron.

By June 1944, Stewart is promoted to Lieutenant colonel. He is then ordered to have a mandatory rest and relaxation (R&R), where he sees Lady Julia one last time. By August 1945, Stewart, now a decorated colonel, returns to Indiana, Pennsylvania, where he struggles to readjust to civilian life. He returns to Hollywood, where Stewart struggles to reconnect with his acting career. Louis B. Mayer proposes Stewart stars as himself in an autobiographical war film about his military service, but Stewart declines the suggestion.

Shortly after, Capra offers Stewart the role of George Bailey in his upcoming film It's a Wonderful Life. Unsure that he is the right actor for the part, Stewart is convinced when Capra reads him a section of the script, in which Bailey delivers an impassioned speech against Mr. Potter. During filming, Stewart, haunted by his wartime memories, struggles to deliver his lines. During breaks, Capra and his co-star Lionel Barrymore privately console Stewart to channel his trauma into his performance. For the scene in which George Bailey prays for help, Stewart reflects on his fallen comrades and goes off-script to finish the scene.

In 1947, Stewart meets Gloria Hatrick McLean and marries her two years later. He adopts her children, Ronald and Michael, and has twin daughters, Judy and Kelly. An epilogue states Stewart reached the rank of Brigadier general and flew his last combat mission during the Vietnam War.

== Cast ==
- KJ Apa as James Stewart
- Jason Alexander as Louis B. Mayer
- Max Casella as Frank Capra
- Sarah Drew as Hedda Hopper
- Julian Works as Second Lieutenant Martinez
- Jen Lilley as Gloria Stewart
- Neal McDonough as Alexander Stewart
- Christopher McDonald as Lionel Barrymore
- Rob Riggle as U.S. Army Colonel Terrill
- Kara Killmer as Lady Julia Tyndall
- Jemma Donovan as Ginger Rogers
- Courtney D'Angelo as Rita Hayworth
- Sarah Faye Terry as Donna Reed

Karolyn Grimes, who played Zuzu in It's a Wonderful Life, has a cameo role.

== Production ==
In February 2024, Deadline reported that Burns & Co. Prods. acquired the exclusive rights to bring James Stewart’s life to the big screen. Stewart's daughter Kelly Stewart-Harcourt served as the executive producer of the film.

In August 2025, it was announced that KJ Apa, Jason Alexander, Sarah Drew, Max Casella, Julian Works and Jen Lilley were cast in the film.

Director Aaron Burns has an extensive background in Christian filmmaking. His previous work includes producing the faith-based films Beyond the Mask (2015), War Room (2015), Overcomer (2019), and The Forge (2024), as well as directing Legacy Peak (2022) and Birthright Outlaw (2023). In a September 2026 interview with Christianity Today, Burns discussed how James Stewart's writings for the Christian magazine Guideposts influenced his approach to Jimmy.

In September 2025, it was announced that Neal McDonough, Christopher McDonald, Rob Riggle, Kara Killmer and Jemma Donovan were cast in the film. That same month, it was announced that filming occurred in West Cork. Filming continued in West Cork in October 2025.

== Release ==
The film had its world premiere as the opening night film for the Heartland International Film Festival in Indianapolis, Indiana on October 8, 2026. The film was then the closing night film for the 2026 Washington West Film Festival on October 10, 2026, followed by a centerpiece gala at the Newport Beach Film Festival on October 17, 2026. The film was released on November 6, 2026 by Fathom Entertainment.

== Reception ==
On the review aggregator website Rotten Tomatoes, 59% of 32 critics' reviews are positive, with an average rating of 6/10. Metacritic assigned the film a weighted average score of 45 out of 100, based on nine critics, indicating "mixed or average" reviews.

Alan Ng of Film Threat scored the film an 8 out of 10, praising KJ Apa's performance and writing: "He finds a take on Stewart that honors the man without ever becoming a caricature, which is no small feat since everyone in America probably has a Jimmy Stewart impression up their sleeve." Pete Hammond of Deadline Hollywood gave the film a positive review and wrote, "The film is far more effective when focusing on his experiences in the war and post-war dealing with what is now known as PTSD. When he's trying to find his way and worth back into society — and Hollywood — Jimmy proves a cut above your average movie-star biopic."

Frank Scheck of The Hollywood Reporter described the film as "heartfelt to a fault." He wrote that the film is a loving tribute rather than a warts-and-all biopic, and that its plodding and episodic quality "makes it play as more dutiful than inspired," hardly sustaining interest over its two-hour runtime. Scheck praised Apa's performance as the best aspect of the film.

Conversely, Monica Castillo of The A.V. Club gave the film a D, and said: "They so desperately wanted to give Stewart a larger-than-life retelling that it doesn't look real or feel genuine—something Stewart himself avoided with his own audiences. In trying to do too much, Jimmy loses sight of the person at the center of its story."
