= The Storm (miniseries) =

2009 American television miniseries

- Written by: David Abramowitz; Dennis A. Pratt
- Teleplay by: Matthew Chernov; David Rosiak
- Directed by: Bradford May
- Starring: James Van Der Beek; Teri Polo; Treat Williams; David James Elliott; Marisol Nichols; Rich Sommer; John Larroquette; Luke Perry
- Music by: Jonathan Snipes
- Country of origin: United States
- Original language: English

Production
- Producers: Erik Heiberg; Lincoln Lageson
- Cinematography: Maximo Munzi
- Editor: Thomas A. Krueger
- Running time: 2 hrs. 49 mins.
- Production companies: Larry Levinson Productions; RHI Entertainment

Original release
- Network: NBC
- Release: July 26 – August 2, 2009

The Storm is a 2009 American science fiction disaster miniseries directed by Bradford May. Based on a previous teleplay by Matthew Chernov and David Rosiak, it was written by David Abramowitz and Dennis A. Pratt and revolves around a weather creation system developed by the Atmospheric Research Institute that threatens life on Earth when deployed by the military. However, while scientist Dr. Jonathan Kirk (James Van Der Beek), Danni Wilson (Teri Polo), and detectives Devon Williams (Marisol Nichols) and Stilman (Luke Perry) attempt to save the world, the former is hunted by hitmen.

The first part of the film was broadcast on the NBC network July 26, 2009. The second part was broadcast on August 2, 2009.

== Plot ==
Through his Atmospheric Research Institute, Robert Terrell (Treat Williams) has finally fulfilled his lifelong dream of completing "weather creation" technology, which has been a landmark event. However, during a test run, a team composed of Dr. Jonathan Kirk, Carly Meyers and Dr. Jack Hoffman send a blast of energy into the ionosphere, driving the planet into unexpected natural disasters. The experiment also causes damage to the weather control laboratory which causes the police led by the detective Devon Williams to begin the investigation.

Dr. Jonathan Kirk (James Van Der Beek) is the only one to intervene and demand that the system be destroyed, but Terrell denies his requests, pushing his team forward. As a result, Dr. Kirk contacts news reporter Danni Wilson (Teri Polo) to help him expose the secrecy and lies — which turns out to be Terrell working with Army General Braxton (David James Elliott) to use the technology as a key military weapon instead of for philanthropic reasons, as initially claimed — of Terrell and the events that are unfolding. General Braxton, however, has ordered hit men to murder Dr. Kirk as he works his way to shut down the technology and save humanity. The hit men murder Danni first and make it look like she was killed by Dr. Kirk so he is immediately considered a prime suspect and arrested. However, Det. Williams begins to doubt that he is the murderer.

To show the importance of the discovery to General Braxton, Terrell orders the team to create a huge storm in Afghanistan which disables the Afghan rebels. But another blast of energy to the ionosphere only makes the situation worse and a strong hurricane appears over the Pacific, heading to Peru. The team then manages to redirect the hurricane away from the coast but then several hurricanes start to endanger the U.S. mainland, the largest being headed to Los Angeles.

After escaping the hit men again, Dr. Kirk is captured by Stillman from military intelligence who knows many things about the weather experiment. He shows Dr. Kirk the hole in the ionosphere which is the cause of the extreme weather around the world and offers him help to develop a method to reverse the damage of the ionosphere. After Dr. Kirk succeeds, Stillman admits he was bait set by Terrell to get Dr. Kirk back and tries to shoot him but he defeats Stillman and calls Det. Williams to join him during the visit of the lab. The hit men appear again and begin shooting at them but are killed by Det. Williams in the shootout.

As the Pentagon cancels the funding of the research for causing uncontrollable weather changes, General Braxton pushes Terrell to stop the violent weather by all means necessary, but the research team has no idea how to settle things without making it worse. Facing the imminent catastrophe, Terrell stops pushing the team, allowing them to do whatever they want. Dr. Kirk arrives in time to apply his method to fix the hole in the ionosphere. The action is successful but Terrell, who sees the solution for the problem, changes his mind and aims a gun at the team. He is then shot by Det. Williams and General Braxton is arrested for causing a global danger but commits suicide.

== Cast ==
- James Van Der Beek as Dr. Jonathan Kirk
- Marisol Nichols as Detective Devon Williams
- Luke Perry as Stilman
- John Larroquette as Bud McGrath
- Treat Williams as Robert Terrell
- David James Elliott as General Wilson Braxton
- Troy Winbush as Brian Drexler
- Teri Polo as Danielle "Danni" Wilson
- Cameron Daddo as Andrew
- Jeannette Sousa as Gretchen 'Gretel' Mays
- Erin Chambers as Carly Meyers
- Rich Sommer as Dr. Jack Hoffman
- Patrick Labyorteaux as Carter
- Richmond Arquette as Till
- Jack Conley as Lt. Crandall
- Adam Mayfield as Brooks
- Jamison Yang as Rex Walker
- Ren Hanami as Dawn Maleuga

== Home media ==
The Storm was released on DVD & Blu-ray on November 3, 2009.
