= Unseen (2023 film) =

2023 American film by Yoko Okumura

- Official release poster
- Directed by: Yoko Okumura
- Written by: Salvatore Cardoni; Brian Rawlins
- Produced by: Paige Pemberton; Paul Uddo
- Starring: Midori Francis; Jolene Purdy; Missi Pyle
- Cinematography: Federico Verardi
- Edited by: Michael Block
- Music by: Tangelene Bolton
- Production companies: Blumhouse Television; MGM+
- Distributed by: Paramount Home Entertainment
- Release date: March 7, 2023
- Running time: 76 minutes
- Country: United States
- Language: English

Unseen is a 2023 American horror thriller film directed by Yoko Okumura in her feature directorial debut, and written by Salvatore Cardoni and Brian Rawlins. The film stars Midori Francis, Jolene Purdy and Missi Pyle. Jason Blum serves as an executive producer under his Blumhouse Television banner.

The plot follows gas station clerk Sam who receives a call from Emily, a nearly blind woman who is running from her murderous ex in the woods. Emily must survive the ordeal with Sam being her eyes from afar using a video call.

The film was digitally released in the United States on March 7, 2023, to positive reviews from critics.

== Plot ==
In Florida, Sam is about to head into work when she picks up a card and types the number from it into her phone. In Michigan, a phone rings inside a cabin in the woods where Emily is trapped by her ex-boyfriend Charlie, who wants her back or he will kill her.

Sam heads to work at a gas station, where she faces harassment from the manager and a wealthy customer. Emily escapes the cabin but breaks her glasses and is unable to see clearly. While hiding in the woods, she calls 911 but the response team informs her it could take a while to find her. She accidentally calls Sam from the missed call log and begs for help.

Using video call, Sam guides Emily through the woods. The two bond while discussing their difficult family situations. Emily wanted to be an ER nurse like her mother and so she could help provide for her but due to her busy schedule, they don't spend enough time together. Sam left Jacksonville to move to Tallahassee to care for her sick mother, who has since died.

Emily falls off a ledge, losing her phone, though her ear-piece is still connected. She finds the phone again and tells Sam she wants to steal Charlie's car and escape. Sam guides her into the car; when Charlie returns, Emily runs him over but crashes into a tree. She goes to kill Charlie with a piece of broken mirror but Sam stops her.

Sam's battery is about to die. She promises to call back when she's found a phone. The wealthy customer from earlier returns and Sam asks to borrow her phone but as expected, she rejects her. Sam grabs the phone anyway and locks herself behind the counter. The woman threatens her with a gun to return the phone.

Emily and Charlie argue until Emily falls into the river. Injured, she is ready to give up when Sam calls her back. She begs Sam to call her mom on the landline and put her on speaker so she can talk to her. She gives a tearful apology to her mom, who champions Emily to stay alive. Sam confesses that she didn't tell the whole truth about her mother before; while caring for her, she left one night for a break and got drunk. Her mom died alone and she has lived with regret ever since.

Sam guides Emily to a barn, where she hides as Charlie approaches. Sam now faces the wealthy woman, her armed husband and her manager all threatening her to give the phone back to its rightful owner. In the barn, Emily sprays Charlie with pesticide chemicals and he tries to choke her to death. Sam reminds her of the piece of broken mirror she put into her pocket earlier and Emily uses it to stab Charlie in the neck, killing him as sirens approach the barn. Meanwhile, police arrive to arrest Sam. Seeing that Emily is safe, Sam surrenders.

Some time later, Emily video calls Sam; the two are now close friends. She is about to go to Japan with her mother for a trip while Sam is going back to school. Emily asks her who she was trying to call that day when she got the wrong number. Sam says she was just trying to order a pizza.

They end the call and Sam drives away after throwing the card she had out of the window. It reads "Tallahassee Suicide Prevention Center".

== Cast ==
- Missi Pyle as Carol
- Midori Francis as Emily
- Jolene Purdy as Sam
- Ren Hanami as Mom
- Michael Patrick Lane as Charlie

== Production ==
In March 2022, Unseen was announced as part of Blumhouse Television and Epix's TV film deal, with Yoko Okumura directing, Salvatore Cardoni and Brian Rawlins writing the screenplay, and Midori Francis, Jolene Purdy and Michael Patrick Lane starring in the film. Jason Blum serves as an executive producer through his Blumhouse Television banner.

=== Filming ===
Principal photography on the film began in January 2022 in New Orleans.

== Release ==
The film was released on March 7, 2023 by MGM+ and Paramount Home Entertainment and started streaming on MGM+ on May 19, 2023.

== Reception ==
On the review aggregator website Rotten Tomatoes, 82% of 17 critics' reviews are positive, with an average rating of 6.2/10. Common Sense Media's Brian Costello gave it three stars and wrote that the film was a "a really good, if not great, horror movie," citing its excellent development of the lead characters, though he found the writing of the villains unsatisfactory and "over the top," the "Karen character" and her husband in particular.
