= Julio Quintana (filmmaker) =

American filmmaker

Julio Quintana is an American filmmaker. He directed the 2021 Netflix film Blue Miracle.

He is married to Marla Quintana. He is from Texas.

== Filmography as director ==
- The Vessel (2016)
- Blue Miracle (2021)
- The Long Game (2023)
- Angel and the Badman (2026)
