= Afterlife of the Party =

2021 film by Stephen Herek

- Official release poster
- Directed by: Stephen Herek
- Written by: Carrie Freedle
- Produced by: Robyn Snyder; Deborah Evans; Vlokkie Gordon
- Starring: Victoria Justice; Midori Francis; Timothy Renouf; Adam Garcia; Gloria Garcia; Spencer Sutherland
- Cinematography: Michael Swan
- Edited by: Maysie Hoy
- Music by: Jessica Rose Weiss
- Production companies: Front Row Films; DAE Light Media
- Distributed by: Netflix
- Release date: September 2, 2021
- Running time: 109 minutes
- Country: United States
- Language: English

Afterlife of the Party is a 2021 American supernatural comedy film directed by Stephen Herek and written by Carrie Freedle. The film stars Victoria Justice as Cassie and Midori Francis as Lisa, two friends who experience challenges in their relationship upon reaching adulthood. The film also stars Timothy Renouf, Adam Garcia, Gloria Garcia and Spencer Sutherland.

Afterlife of the Party was released on September 2, 2021, by Netflix; by September 7, it was the most viewed film on the platform. The film received mixed reviews from critics, who praised Justice's and Francis's performances and its humor.

== Plot ==
Cassie and Lisa have been best friends since first grade. Now as adults, their interests and social lives have changed. Cassie is a fun-loving party planner, while Lisa lives a secluded life away from most social interaction as an archeologist. One day, Cassie convinces Lisa to go out to a party for her 25th birthday week and before leaving they meet Max, who lives a very similar life to Lisa, moving in next door. Max and Lisa seem to be mutually interested.

Cassie and Lisa head to a club, getting into an argument soon after, when some of Cassie's acquaintances want to head to other parties and Lisa chooses to leave. During the argument, Lisa points out that their friendship has changed, that Cassie is always trying to pretend to be someone else and they realize that they now have little in common. They part ways and later that evening Cassie heads home and passes out in her room.

When Cassie wakes up, she goes to the bathroom hungover, trips and hits her head on the toilet, resulting in her death. She awakens in a room and meets Val, an angel handler who explains that Cassie has been dead for over a year. Before reaching the "Afterlife party in Heaven" Cassie has a list of three people she needs to help as a guardian angel. The list includes her best friend Lisa, her father Howie, and her mother Sofia. Cassie has 5 days to figure out the best way to help each of them before time runs out, or else she goes to the "below".

Visiting Howie, Cassie sees he's in mourning, not taking good care of himself and leaving his yoga by the wayside. Lisa has thrown herself into her archeology work at the museum. Sofia has a young daughter named Morgan that Cassie's never met. She must connect with them all, but they cannot see nor hear her. Cassie shadows Lisa the first day. A bakery near their apartment opened the same week Cassie died, and Lisa is friends with the owner, Emme. When a possible opportunity arises to be part of a dig, Lisa doubts herself. That night, a frustrated Cassie starts humming, causing her to finally be seen.

Apparently, true soulmates are able to be seen. So, Cassie follows her most of the next day, until Lisa finally lets her in. They are enjoying themselves doing a puzzle when Max comes up in conversation. Cassie meddles, getting him to come upstairs and invite her to a Koop music video shoot. The date goes well; Lisa and Max finally admit their feelings and kiss.

Lisa offers to help Cassie with her mother. Driving to her house, she rewords Cassie's questions, and Sofia admits her regret. Later, at her dad's, Cassie sees her parents making peace and finally forgives her mother. She then takes advantage of the bakery's anniversary to connect her dad with Emme. Lisa makes Cassie promise to find her later. Lisa arranges for all of Cassie's loved ones to gather to release wish lanterns for her. Howie begins to sing 'God Only Knows', and Lisa and Cassie join in. Finally able to see Cassie, she and Howie hug, and she says she's no longer afraid before saying goodbye to him and Lisa. Even though she broke a few rules, Cassie is sent to heaven. The elevator stops on the way to pick up Kooper Keene, who'd just died while volunteering in a war-torn African country. They get off the elevator into paradise together, holding hands.

== Cast ==
- Victoria Justice as Cassie
- Midori Francis as Lisa
- Robyn Scott as Val
- Timothy Renouf as Max
- Adam Garcia as Howie
- Gloria Garcia as Sofia
- Myfanwy Waring as Emme
- Spencer Sutherland as Koop

== Production ==
In October 2020, it was announced that Victoria Justice and Midori Francis would star in Afterlife of the Party, a film directed by Stephen Herek for Netflix. Principal photography began on October 21, 2020, and concluded on December 6, 2020, in Cape Town, South Africa.

=== Music ===
Afterlife of the Party (Music from the Netflix Film)

EP by Spencer Sutherland, Victoria Justice and Jessica Rose Weiss
- Released: September 2, 2021
- Length: 20:49
- Label: Maisie
- Producers: Adam Friedman; Seth Jones; Storyboards; Keaton Stromberg; Spencer Sutherland; Jessica Rose Weiss

Spencer Sutherland chronology
| Indigo (2020) | Afterlife of the Party (Music from the Netflix Film) (2021) |

Victoria Justice chronology
| Victorious 3.0: Even More Music from the Hit TV Show (2012) | Afterlife of the Party (Music from the Netflix Film) (2021) |

Jessica Rose Weiss chronology
| Afterlife of the Party (Music from the Netflix Film) (2021) | Cinderella (Score from the Amazon Original Movie) (2021) |

The same day the film premiered, the soundtrack EP was released by Spencer Sutherland and Victoria Justice, who both starred in the film, and its composer, Jessica Rose Weiss.

| No. | Title | Writer(s) | Performer(s) | Length |
|---|---|---|---|---|
| 1. | "Blush" | Harrison Mead; Seth Jones; Spencer Sutherland | Sutherland | 3:06 |
| 2. | "Drive" | Adam Friedman; Feli Ferraro; Sutherland | Sutherland | 2:31 |
| 3. | "Home" | Keaton Stromberg; Sutherland; Victoria Justice | Sutherland; Justice | 3:19 |
| 4. | "One Look" | Stromberg; Sutherland; Tiffany Stringer | Sutherland | 3:25 |
| 5. | "Score Suite" | Jessica Rose Weiss | Weiss | 8:28 |
| Total length: | | | | 20:49 |

== Release ==
The film was released on September 2, 2021 by Netflix. As of September 7, it was the most popular movie on the platform according to its ranking system.

== Reception ==
On the review aggregator website Rotten Tomatoes, the film holds an approval rating of 56% based on 18 reviews, with an average rating of 5/10.

Christy Lemire, writing for RogerEbert.com, gave the film a score of 1.5/4 stars, saying that the film "strives for both wild, physical humor and heart-tugging poignancy [but] achieves neither, occupying an uncomfortable middle ground of its own", and added: "Francis' authenticity and soulfulness make you wish she were at the center of the film instead of on the sidelines." She concluded: "Justice may have a striking screen presence, but she can only do much with material that's less than heavenly."

Jennifer Green of Common Sense Media gave the film a score of 3/5 stars, writing: "Part of the problem is that the central idea of Afterlife of the Party is quite sad ... yet the film does everything it can in its first half to play this as straight comedy"; however, she praised the film's second half, saying: "the script delves into what Cassie is leaving behind and allows its characters to actually feel something, but the disconnect in tone is noticeable."

Tatat Bunnag of the Bangkok Post described the film as "a formulaic fantasy rom-com that does what's been done before, but packs it in a format for millennials and Gen Z", and added: "Despite being very predictable, the drama and a fair share of heartwarming elements were handled pretty well."
