= Saccharine (film) =

2026 film by Natalie Erika James

- American theatrical release poster
- Directed by: Natalie Erika James
- Written by: Natalie Erika James
- Produced by: Anna McLeish; Sarah Shaw; Natalie Erika James
- Starring: Midori Francis; Danielle Macdonald; Madeleine Madden; Robert Taylor
- Cinematography: Charlie Sarroff
- Edited by: Sean Lahiff
- Music by: Hannah Peel
- Production companies: Stan; Carver Films; Thrum Films
- Distributed by: Maslow Entertainment (Australia and New Zealand)
- Release dates: 22 January 2026 (Sundance); 22 May 2026 (United States); 9 July 2026 (Australia)
- Running time: 113 minutes
- Country: Australia
- Language: English
- Box office: $559,000

Saccharine is a 2026 Australian supernatural horror film written and directed by Natalie Erika James. It stars Midori Francis, Danielle Macdonald, Madeleine Madden, and Robert Taylor.

The film had its world premiere at the Midnight section of the 2026 Sundance Film Festival on 22 January. It was released in the United States on 22 May 2026, and in Australia on 9 July 2026.

== Premise ==
Medical student Hana has always struggled with her weight and binge eating. A chance encounter with an old school friend that used to be in the same situation, offers her a way out of her predicament via a new wonder pill. Hana reluctantly takes the pill, and finds that it works miracles for her and the weight begins to drop off. Excited by the results, Hanna reconnects with her friend to order more, but discovers it’s going to cost her a lot of money. Using her medical skills Hana analysis the pills' compounds and discovers that it contains nothing more than human ashes. After succumbing to an obscure weight-loss craze, lovelorn medical student Hana finds herself terrorised by the ghost of the person she's eating.

== Cast ==
- Midori Francis as Hana
- Danielle Macdonald as Josie
- Madeleine Madden as Alanya
- Robert Taylor as Travis
- Showko Showfukutei as Kimie
- Annie Shapero as Melissa
- Joseph Baldwin as Ryan

== Production ==
The film is from writer-director Natalie Erika James. It is produced by Anna McLeish and Sarah Shaw of Carver Films. Production also comes from Thrum Films and investment came from Screen Australia, XYZ Films and Stan, in association with VicScreen. Co-producer is Ben Morgan.

The cast is led by Midori Francis, Madeleine Madden and Danielle Macdonald.

Principal photography took place across Melbourne, including at Docklands Studios Melbourne and La Trobe University, Brunswick and Beaumaris. Filming was completed in December 2024.

== Release ==
Saccharine premiered in the Midnight section of the 2026 Sundance Film Festival on 22 January 2026, followed by its European premiere at the Special Midnight section of the 76th Berlin International Film Festival on 18 February. It later had its Australian premiere on 4 June 2026 at the 73rd Sydney Film Festival.

Prior to the film's premiere at Sundance, Independent Film Company and Shudder acquired distribution rights for North America, the United Kingdom, and Ireland, with the intention to release the film theatrically at some point in 2026, followed by a streaming release on Shudder.

The film was theatrically released in the United Stares by Independent Film Company on 22 May 2026, before its release in Australia and New Zealand by Maslow Entertainment on 9 July 2026.

The film was released on VOD and digital platforms in the US on 12 June 2026, and began streaming on Shudder on 24 July. In Australia, it will later be made available on Australian streaming service Stan as a Stan Original production.

== Reception ==
=== Critical response ===
On the review aggregator website Rotten Tomatoes, 71% of 77 critics' reviews are positive, with an average rating of 6.3/10. The website's consensus reads: "Tapping into anxieties latent in an era of weight loss drugs, Saccharine's insights into nuanced themes come with a lot of empty calories but its gross-out scares sure do hit the spot." Metacritic, which uses a weighted average, assigned the film a score of 62 out of 100, based on 12 critics, indicating "generally favorable" reviews.

Francis's lead performance received praise from critics. The Hollywood Reporter wrote that her "commitment to the central role is so unfaltering that she makes the script's rough patches less of a deal-breaker", while Tomris Laffly of RogerEbert.com described Francis as "extraordinary".

=== Accolades ===
Award	Date of ceremony	Category	Recipient(s)	Result	Ref.
Teddy Award	20 February 2026	Best Feature Film	Natalie Erika James	Nominated	
