= Hollywood Chamber Orchestra =

American orchestra

- Founded: 2015
- Music director: Noah Gladstone & Mark Robertson
- Website: hollywoodchamberorchestra.com

The Hollywood Chamber Orchestra (HCO) is an American orchestra based in Los Angeles, California, and founded in 2015 by musicians Noah Gladstone and Mark Robertson, who are also co-music directors.

== Overview ==
Its first public performance was on August 8, 2015, at the Colburn School's Zipper Hall. The program consisted of horn concertos and was presented by the 2015 International Horn Society. Included on the program was the world premiere of Brad Warnaar's horn concerto, conducted by the composer and performed by Andrew Bain, the principal horn player of the Los Angeles Philharmonic. Their first public ticketed concert occurred on December 11, 2015, at the Montalban Theater in Hollywood, featuring Vivaldi's Four Seasons, performed by Los Angeles Philharmonic concertmaster Martin Chalifour. Other soloists appearing since this inaugural concert have included violinist Sarah Chang, pianist Molly Morkoski, clarinetist Eddie Daniels, and singers Úyanga Bold, Cindy O'Connor, Tyler Duncan, Eleni Matos, Garth Neustadter, Franchesca Retford, and Holly Sedillos. Subsequent concerts have included Star Trek:The Ultimate Voyage Tour at the Pantages Theatre, conducted by Justin Freer; and the world premiere of the concert version of the documentary film Blackfish at the Montalban Theater, conducted by composer Jeff Beal. On July 24, 2016, the HCO commissioned and premiered seven new works by composers Michael Barry, Chad Cannon, Andy Forsberg, John Kaefer, Brian Langsbard, Susie Benchasil Seiter, and Andrew Morgan Smith.

On March 12, 2016, the HCO recorded composer Jeremy Zuckerman's score to the documentary film Beartrek. Beartrek premiered at the Santa Barbara Film Festival February 6, 2018.

On September 19, 2016, the HCO recorded composer Joey Newman's score to the short film Hoshino, a Star Wars fan film directed by Stephen Vitale, written by Eric Carrasco, and starring actress Anna Akana. As of February 28, 2018, the short film has over 1.8 million views on YouTube. On October 28 and 29, 2016, the Hollywood Chamber Orchestra was the featured orchestra, conducted by Anthony Parnther, for Riot Games' online game League of Legends World Championship Event at the Staples Center and LA Live. As of November 15, 2016, these two concert videos on Facebook have a combined 2.7 million views.

On November 11–13, 2016, the HCO was the featured orchestra for the Orange County premiere of Harry Potter and the Sorcerer's Stone, live-to-picture, conducted by Justin Freer and produced by CineConcerts, at the Segerstrom Center for the Arts in Costa Mesa, CA. Pianist Randy Kerber, who recorded for John Williams' original score to the film, joined the orchestra for all four performances, which were attended by approximately 11,000 people over 3 days. On December 17, 2016, the HCO accompanied Andrew Lippa in the world premiere performance of Swan Lake: A New Musical in Concert, composed by Peter Seibert and J. Patrick Lundquist, at the Montalban Theater in Hollywood.

On February 23, 2017, the HCO, conducted by string arranger Jeremy Rubolino, recorded five tracks for Logic's third album Everybody at the Warner Brothers Scoring Stage in Burbank, California. The five tracks recorded were "Hallelujah", "AfricAryaN", "Anziety", "Black SpiderMan", and "1-800-273-8255". The album was released May 5, 2017, and opened at the #1 spot on Billboard's TOP 200 album chart in the United States. On November 28, 2017, "1-800-273-8255" was named one of the five nominees for Song of the Year at the 2018 Grammy Awards. It was also nominated for Best Music Video. On February 13, 2018, the single "1-800-273-8255" was certified quadruple platinum by the RIAA.

On May 7, 2017, the HCO, in conjunction with Future is Female Concerts and Events, presented ten new works by female composers at the Moss Theater at the New Roads School in Santa Monica, California.

On May 8, 2017, the HCO was the featured orchestra during the song "Black SpiderMan" with the rap artist Logic on Jimmy Kimmel Live, on ABC, arranged and conducted by film composer Jeremy Rubolino.

On May 27, 2017, at the Montalban Theater in Hollywood, the HCO presented seven new works in the concert, "World Premieres: Year Two". The seven composers represented were: Albert Chang, Christopher North, Elisa Rice, Charles Sydnor, Ashoka Thiagarajan, Pinar Toprak, and Genevieve Vincent.

On June 16, 2017, at Colburn School's Zipper Hall, the HCO presented violinist Nathan Cole, the first associate concertmaster of the Los Angeles Philharmonic, in a traditional program of Bach, Grieg, and Copland.

On June 17, 2017, at Santa Monica's Broad Stage, the HCO presented the world premiere of Jeremy Turner's Five Came Back: Suite for Chamber Orchestra, based on the soundtrack from the Netflix documentary series Five Came Back. The program also featured violinist Nathan Cole and Mark Robertson, co-music director of the HCO. After this performance, Turner was nominated for a Prime Time Emmy for his score to Five Came Back, but did not win.

On September 4, 2018, the HCO again presented several world premieres by female composers in conjunction with The Future is Female concerts and events, this time at the Wiltern Theater. The 2018 edition featured the composers Germaine Franco, Tamar-kali, Ronit Kirchman, Cindy O’Connor, Heather McIntosh, Mandy Hoffman, Tori Letzler, Emily Rice, Perrine Virgile-Piekarski, ASKA, Tangelene Bolton, and Jessie Weiss.

On March 30, 2019, the HCO was the featured orchestra for the west coast premiere of the live-to-film concert version of the 1993 film Rudy, with music by Jerry Goldsmith; conducted by Justin Freer, and produced by CineConcerts.

On December 4, 2019, composer Jeff Beal conducted his score (live to picture) of the documentary The Biggest Little Farm, at the Wiltern Theater in Los Angeles.

After a brief hiatus during the Covid-19 pandemic, the HCO returned with several interesting performances:

On August 25, 2022, the HCO was the featured orchestra in internet sensation Madison Beer's music video to "Dangerous" with over 5 million views to date.

On November 11, 2022, the HCO was the featured orchestra for pianist Joachim Horsely's performance of Caribbean Nocturnes in Concert, held at NeueHouse Hollywood.

On April 26, 2024, the HCO was the featured orchestra for the LA premiere of "Outer Wilds:Live with Andrew Prahlow" at the Montalban Theatre in Los Angeles, with Mark Robertson, conductor.

On May 7, 2024, the HCO was the featured orchestra for "Netflix is a Joke Presents: Seth Rogen Smokes the Bowl" at the Hollywood Bowl, with Rob Schaer, conductor, with Snoop Dogg conducting briefly during his comedy set.

On June 10, 2024, the HCO was the featured orchestra for Ubisoft's STAR WARS: OUTLAWS livestream event, with Anthony Parnther, conductor.

On July 6, 2024, the HCO was led by conductor Lucas Richman along with soloist Yuze Lee, in a performance of Rossini, Ravel, and Tchaikovsky, at Disney Hall.

On March 23, 2026, the HCO was led by conductor Dominik Svoboda in a concert of world premieres at the Colony Theater in Burbank, CA. The participating composers were Tomáš Borl, Jiří Hradil, Petr Wajsar, Tomáš Živor, Guillaume Cochard-Lemoine, Zuzana Michlerová, Dominik Svoboda, Martin Klusák, and Elia Cmiral. The concert was a collaboration between Composers Summit Prague and SoundCzech.

== Partial list of world premiere performances ==
(*=indicates commissioned by the HCO)

- Concerto For Horn and Orchestra – Brad Warnaar, composer and conductor (August 8, 2015)
- Blackfish: Live (movie live to picture) – Jeff Beal, composer and conductor (July 1, 2016)*
- The Blackfish Effect (short film, live) – Jeff Beal, composer and conductor (July 1, 2016)*
- Progeny – Andrew Morgan Smith, composer and conductor (July 24, 2016)*
- Suite for Chamber Orchestra – Michael Barry, composer; Anthony Parnther, conductor (July 24, 2016)*
- States of Motion – John Kaefer, composer and conductor; Molly Morkoski, pianist (July 24, 2016)*
- Reckless – Brian Langsbard, composer and conductor (July 24, 2016)*
- Harlem, 1951 – Chad Cannon, composer; Anthony Parnther, conductor (July 24, 2016)*
- Beyond Us – Andy Forsberg, composer and conductor (July 24, 2016)*
- Requiem – Susie Benchasil Seiter, composer and conductor (July 24, 2016)*
- Concerto for Clarinet and 2 Pianos – Egils Straume, composer; Bernard Rubinstein, conductor (September 29, 2016)
- Swan Lake: The Musical – music and lyrics by J. Patrick Lundquist and Peter Seibert; conducted by Mr. Seibert (December 17, 2016)
- Divertimento – Tangelene Bolton, composer and conductor (May 7, 2017)
- Life and Dying – A Particular Account – Jessica Rae Huber, composer and conductor (May 7, 2017)
- Suite for a Phoenix – Edith Mudge, composer and conductor (May 7, 2017)
- Public Enemy – Brooke deRosa, composer and conductor (May 7, 2017)
- New Zealand's Guide to Tessering – Nami Melumad, composer and conductor (May 7, 2017)
- Cease to Exist – Tori Letzler, composer; Anne-Kathrin Dern, conductor (May 7, 2017)
- Bhavishya – Jessica Weiss, composer; Anne-Kathrin Dern, conductor (May 7, 2017)
- Gold Mountain: Suite for Chamber Orchestra – Anne-Kathrin Dern, composer and conductor (May 7, 2017)
- Ten Years – Perrine Virgile-Piekarski, composer and conductor (May 7, 2017)
- Prelude to the Beginning of Time – Vivian Aguiar-Buff, composer; Anne-Kathrin Dern, conductor (May 7, 2017)
- Radha – Charles Sydnor, composer and conductor (May 27, 2017)*
- Charatah – Concerto for Electric Cello – Elisa C. Rice, composer; Anthony Parnther, conductor; Cameron Stone, cellist (May 27, 2017)*
- Frontiers – Albert Chang, composer and conductor (May 27, 2017)*
- Illuminance – Pinar Toprak, composer and conductor (May 27, 2017)*
- Rave Suite: A Goddess's Tale – Ashoka Thiagarajan, composer; Anthony Parnther, conductor (May 27, 2017)*
- Eavesdrop Suite – Christopher North, composer and conductor (May 27, 2017)*
- Aphelion – Genevieve Vincent, composer; Sharon Lavery, conductor (May 27, 2017)*
- Five Came Back: Suite for Chamber Orchestra – Jeremy Turner, composer and conductor (June 17, 2017)*
- Killer Klowns from Outer Space: Live to Film with Orchestra – John Massari, composer and conductor (May 19, 2018)
- Parasite: (live to film with orchestra) – Jaeil Jung, composer and conductor (January 26, 2020)

== About the music directors ==
Noah Gladstone, co-music director, is a multi faceted musician from Los Angeles. A trombonist at his core, he has performed professionally with the Chicago Symphony Orchestra, Los Angeles Philharmonic, Opera Santa Barbara, New West Symphony, The Hollywood Bowl Orchestra, Juilliard 415 as well as many other world class ensembles. In addition to his orchestral experience, he is a regular figure in the Hollywood studio music scene as a trombonist and a music contractor and has produced music for Showtime/CBS, Riot Games, Microsoft, Imagine Dragons, The Weinstein Company, Brand X Music, as well as other media for TV, film, recording artists, video games and advertising. He also manages the musical personnel of the West Los Angeles Symphony Orchestra, The San Bernardino Symphony and Opera Santa Barbara. He holds a Bachelors and Masters of Music degree from The University of Southern California.

Mark Robertson, co-music director, is originally from Fort Wayne, Indiana. Both parents were musical (piano and voice) which led to Mark to picking up the violin at the early age of five. After graduating from Boston University and The Juilliard School, Robertson moved to Los Angeles in 1995, shortly after giving his New York recital debut at Carnegie's Weill Recital Hall. His violin teachers have included Dorothy DeLay, Kurt Sassmansshaus, Piotr Milewski, and Martin Chalifour. A ten-year alumnus of the Aspen Music Festival, Robertson served as concertmaster of both the Philharmonia Orchestra and the concert orchestra under such conductors as James Conlon, Junichi Hirokami, and Murry Sidlin.

While in Los Angeles, Robertson has been guest concertmaster for the Riverside County Philharmonic, the New West Symphony, the Pasadena Pops, and the Culver City Chamber Orchestra. He has also recorded for over 800 movie and television soundtracks, most prominently as concertmaster and solo violinist for the award-winning shows House of Cards and Penny Dreadful. He also served as concertmaster for the recent and upcoming films Final Destination: Bloodlines, Dashing Through the Snow, Jazzy, One Night in Miami, White Men Can't Jump, Rather, Big City Greens: Spacecation, The Boogeyman, Strays, The Hunt, Shaft, The Biggest Little Farm, The House with A Clock in Its Walls, Triple Frontier, The Nun, and Under the Silver Lake, in addition to previous films including Baywatch, Pitch Perfect 3, Contagion, Much Ado About Nothing, Ride Along 1 and 2, Premium Rush, Blackfish, Merchants of Doubt, and Horrible Bosses 1 and 2. He has conducted ensembles at the Aspen Music Festival, the Coachella Music Festival (Wu-Tang Clan), and for Access Hollywood (Carly Rae Jepsen). On the pop music side of things, Mark has worked with Logic, A Great Big World & Christina Aguilera, Billy Childs, Daughtry, OneRepublic, the Fray, and Kelly Clarkson, among others. He recently served as concertmaster for Il Volo's performance at the Dolby Theatre (Hollywood), and for Idina Menzel's performance at the Hollywood Bowl.
