= Tommy (TV series) =

2020 American police procedural crime drama television series

- Genre: Crime drama; Political drama; Procedural drama
- Created by: Paul Attanasio
- Starring: Edie Falco; Michael Chernus; Adelaide Clemens; Russell G. Jones; Olivia Lucy Phillip; Vladimir Caamaño; Joseph Lyle Taylor; Thomas Sadoski
- Country of origin: United States
- Original language: English
- No. of seasons: 1
- No. of episodes: 12

Production
- Executive producers: Paul Attanasio; Darryl Frank; Justin Falvey; Kate Dennis
- Production locations: New York City; Los Angeles
- Camera setup: Single-camera
- Running time: 43 minutes
- Production companies: Amblin Television; Atelier Paul Attanasio; CBS Television Studios

Original release
- Network: CBS
- Release: February 6 – May 7, 2020

Tommy is an American police procedural crime drama television series created by Paul Attanasio that aired on CBS from February 6 to May 7, 2020. The series stars Edie Falco as the first female police chief of the Los Angeles Police Department. In May 2020, the series was canceled after one season.

== Plot ==
The series centers around Abigail "Tommy" Thomas, played by Edie Falco, who becomes the first female Chief of Police for the LAPD. Tommy was a NYPD officer who came to office as a result of a federal judge's order to hire a female police chief. Tommy, who is divorced, has an adult daughter and grand-daughter living in LA. Tommy is gay, and ultimately comes out. She leads the LAPD as they fight crime every day in Los Angeles and her inner circle includes Donn Cooper a LAPD Commander who serves as Tommy's Chief Of Staff and her second in command, Blake Sullivan who is Tommy's Director Of Communications, Ken Rosey, a lawyer who help Tommy with her speeches and Abner Diaz a veteran LAPD Detective who is head of Tommy's Security Detail.

== Cast and characters ==
=== Main ===
- Edie Falco as LAPD Chief Abigail "Tommy" Thomas, a former NYPD captain notorious for accusing her superior of sexual misconduct, making her a feminist hero but also ruining her career. She is a lesbian. Tommy subsequently accepts Mayor Gray's offer to become the first female head of police in Los Angeles.
- Michael Chernus as Ken Rosey, a lawyer and speechwriter who works with Tommy to manage her public image.
- Adelaide Clemens as Blake Sullivan, Tommy's LAPD communications director.
- Russell G. Jones as Donn Cooper, a Police Commander and was chief of staff to Tommy's predecessor. She chooses to retain him due to his reputation for giving honest advice.
- Olivia Lucy Phillip as Kate Jones, Tommy's daughter, a school psychologist. She and her mother are trying to patch things up after years of estrangement.
- Vladimir Caamaño as Abner Diaz, a LAPD Detective who is assigned as Tommy's driver and personal security detail.
- Joseph Lyle Taylor as Deputy Mayor Doug Dudik, Mayor Gray's right-hand man.
- Thomas Sadoski as Mayor Buddy Gray, who is forced to hire Tommy after a scandal involving the previous chief. He has a habit of being politically incorrect and always speaking his mind.

=== Recurring ===
- Tonye Patano as Mrs. Gates, Tommy's secretary.
- Luke Jones as Henry, Kate's unfaithful husband.
- Naledi Murray as Luna, Kate's daughter and Tommy's granddaughter.
- Kurt Uy as Deputy Chief of Detectives Joe Kang.
- Matt Dellapina as Vincent Siano, a journalist investigating the prison murder of a former campaign donor.
- Katrina Lenk as Kiley Mills, an influential sports agent and romantic interest of Tommy's.
- Sasha Diamond as Ashley Kim, Eric Decker's successor as Tommy's chief tech.

=== Guest ===
- Corbin Bernsen as Milton Leakey, Tommy's resentful predecessor as Chief of Police.
- Alexander Hodge as Eric Decker, Tommy's chief tech until he resigns over a disagreement about police surveillance.
- Philip Anthony-Rodriguez as Vice Commander Rascal Santos.
- Chelsea Ingram as Mayor's Assistant.

== Episodes ==
No.	Title	Directed by	Written by	Original release date	U.S. viewers (millions)
1	"In Dreams Begin Responsibilities"	Kate Dennis	Paul Attanasio	February 6, 2020	4.81
In her first week as Chief of Police of the LAPD, Abigail "Tommy" Thomas inserts herself into a standoff between the city and ICE over Maria de la Puerta, an undocumented woman with a mysterious past. Tommy arranges for Maria's teenage daughter Madison to stay with her daughter Kate, as she is presently living in a hotel room after a recent divorce. Kate despises her mother for putting her career before her, but agrees to help. Tommy comes under pressure from Arturo Lopez, a powerful businessman and ally to Mayor Buddy Gray, to cover up the truth: he brought Maria into the country as a 15-year old, raped her, and that Madison is his daughter. Tommy learns that Lopez will likely get away with his crimes unless Maria testifies against him, and that because she is dependent on the money he provides her with, will almost certainly return to him and allow Madison to be victimized as well. She arranges for Maria and her child to be put into witness protection and orders Lopez's arrest. Kate asks Tommy to move in with her as her marriage is in dire straits and she wants a chance for the two to reconcile.
2	"There Are No Strangers Here"	PJ Pesce	Tom Szentgyörgyi	February 13, 2020	4.41
Officer Eddie Guzman is found dead at the scene of what appears to be an ambush. Tommy insists that the case be handled delicately, angering some officers who want the LAPD to retaliate while her predecessor, Milton Leakey, attacks her in the media as soft and incompetent. Mayor Grey is informed that Lopez is willing to cut a deal with the U.S. attorney in exchange for lesser charges. He asks Blake to try and figure out what Lopez is offering. Tommy personally meets with a civilian who filed a complaint against Guzman; she also gives him her card and asks him to contact her office if another cop assaults him. Ken and Donn gather evidence suggesting Guzman was depressed, and that his father, retired cop Alex Guzman, was seen near the scene of his death. Tommy visits Alex and reveals the truth: his son killed himself and he faked the ambush to protect him from the disgrace of suicide. Leakey, embarrassed, agrees to help Tommy by raising funds to take care of Eddie's wife. Blake is informed by Ken that Lopez was murdered by his fellow inmates. Kate gives Tommy the chance to bond with her granddaughter Luna.
3	"Lifetime Achievement"	Christine Moore	Jill Blotevogel	February 20, 2020	4.71
Tommy is asked by Mayor Grey to take charge in an incident involving film mogul Alexander Shaw: a woman named Tara Owens confesses she struck Shaw over the head when he tried to rape her. When Shaw dies from his injuries, his wife and friends put pressure on the city to have the case wrapped up quickly. Owens' lawyer goes on offense by claiming that Shaw had a history of sexual misconduct, which piques Tommy's interest. She personally sits in on an interrogation and determines that Tara is telling the truth, but is also hiding something. Mayor Grey reaches out to Blake for her advice and possibly her assistance in handling an impending separation from his wife. Tara's old boss, Walker, tells Diaz and his partner that Tara may have had a previous relationship with Shaw, but when Tommy looks into it, she discovers that he fired her after she told him that Shaw raped her. This information is turned over to the prosecution, who agree to drop all charges against Tara. Tommy reconnects with her actor ex-husband, who shares her concerns that Kate and her husband have fallen out of love with each other.
4	"19 Hour Day"	Geary McLeod	Stephen Belber	February 27, 2020	4.65
On the eve of a major climate-change summit, the LAPD receives a credible tip that a bomb will be detonated. Tommy's efforts to find the bomber and thwart the attack are thrown into disarray when a mudslide strikes a major highway, Luna goes missing, and a youth program needs her to deliver remarks. On top of that, her chief tech Decker insists that Nemesis--a system that gathers private data for the detection of threats and suspects--be used to find the bomber without first getting a warrant. Tommy has academy trainees handle the mudslide, sends Diaz and Ken to find Luna, and asks Blake to address the youths. She also requests a warrant to utilize Nemesis, but when the request is denied, she decides not to use it. By setting a trap for the bomber, the LAPD is able to neutralize the bomb in time for the summit to successfully conclude. Diaz and Ken find Luna, while Decker informs Tommy he will resign as he feels she doesn't respect his concerns. Ken and Diaz find Luna, but Kate tells her mother that while's she grateful, a part of her will never forgive her putting the lives of others before family. Blake joins Mayor Grey for a drink.
5	"To Take a Hostage"	Brendan Walsh	Lucy Teitler	March 5, 2020	4.62
Disgraced promoter Austin Blaine and an accomplice take hostages while trying to evade pursuing police; Blaine demands money in return for the hostages' lives, but the situation is quickly complicated when Diaz uncovers evidence that he also being held hostage by the accomplice, a victim of his fraud. Tommy needs two votes on the city council to pass a measure adding new officers; she tasks Ken with obtaining the vote of Councilwoman Cordero while she works on Councilman Peet. Cordero trades her vote for a seat on the police commission, but Peet refuses to support the measure without the approval of his close friend, Leakey. Rather than give in to Leakey's exorbitant demands for the vote, Tommy lets the measure die. The gunman releases the hostages, but keeps Blaine so he can kill him. Tommy intervenes by personally informing the gunman that Blaine's remaining assets will be seized to pay back the people he stole from, and the gunman surrenders. That night, Tommy goes on a date with Kiley, a sports agent, and they share a kiss. Blake finds evidence that Arturo's killers received payment for their actions.
6	"The Ninth Girl"	Ed Ornelas	Carl Capotorto	March 12, 2020	4.79
A wealthy Chinese-American businessman and his husband put pressure on Mayor Grey and Tommy to find their kidnapped daughter, Clara. The case partners Diaz with Keller, a fellow detective and closeted racist who openly berates and challenges him at every opportunity. Events take a turn for the worse when the Chinese consulate informs Tommy that they are pulling their support for her investigation as they disapprove of gay adoption. Investigators are able to trace the kidnapping to a brothel, and find a suspect. Tommy uses her intuition to determine that the suspect is Clara's real mother; her baby was taken from her and given to the couple by traffickers. Keller insults Diaz, daring him to fight back, but fails when Diaz brushes him aside. The suspect leads the police to her baby, and the couple agree to give up their parental rights and provide the financial support the child and her mother will need. Blake accepts Mayor Grey's offer to take her to Malibu for a getaway. Donn tells Diaz to come to him if he has any future problems. Tommy receives a report revealing that her son-in-law Henry is a john.
7	"Vic"	Christine Moore	Margaret Rose Lester	April 2, 2020	5.35
Rapper and activist Vic Mazy is murdered, straining Tommy's efforts to improve relations with LA's African-American community. One of Mayor Grey's donors, a rich developer named Jonathan Lovell, plans to buy a local property Vic purchased for public usage; he arranges for images to be released that suggest Vic had gang ties. Tommy gives permission for Henry's name to be forwarded to the D.A. for possible prosecution and decides to confront him. Henry is belligerent, blaming Tommy for ruining his life, and Kate is equally mad that her mother won't protect her husband. Ken discovers that Blake is considering a more serious relationship with Mayor Grey, and advises her to be careful that she doesn't get hurt. Vic's murder is closed when an ex-boyfriend of his partner Coco confesses to shooting him after an argument. Mayor Grey washes his hands of the matter, telling Lovell he won't be permitted to buy the property. Lovell contacts a private investigator with instructions to gather compromising material on Tommy. Tommy decides to start clearing the LAPD's gang database of individuals who have no actual ties to gangs.
8	"The Swatting Game"	Melanie Mayron	Christina Anderson	April 9, 2020	5.17
The LAPD goes on the hunt for a professional gamer behind a swatting incident that results in a fatal shooting. Tommy makes a comment to the press acknowledging responsibility for the shooting, and the gamer starts making multiple fake 911 calls while releasing private information on an officer that reveals he is HIV-positive among other things. Kate is arrested while trying to stop a student from being harassed by cops and Diaz bails her out when Henry fails to answer her phone call. Tommy gets a lead on the suspect, and persuades the deceased man's daughter to take part in a sting operation to catch him. Nevertheless, the family announces their intention to sue for a larger settlement, as Tommy's comments have made the department liable. The head of the officers' union informs Tommy that he will personally sue her for abusing her authority if she tries to punish the men who arrested Kate. Kate asks her mother to move back in, as she has given up on her husband even though it turns out he won't be prosecuted. The stress of recent events causes Tommy to reevaluate her life. She decides to start a real relationship with Kiley.
9	"Free to Go"	Sarah Pia Anderson	Jill Blotevogel	April 16, 2020	5.16
A Saudi law student, Norah, intentionally assaults a cop to get arrested, claiming that she wants the LAPD's help getting political asylum to avoid being sent home to her family. Blake agrees to assist a journalist friend, Vincent, but he mysteriously disappears and a stranger is seen tailing Blake. Kate tells her mother that she and Henry have mutually decided to get a divorce. The student's family uses their connections to have the federal government threaten to investigate the LAPD for violating their daughter's civil rights, and when Tommy tries to get the police union to back her up, the chief demands she protect the officers who arrested Kate in return. Blake tries to find Vincent. Detective Keller informs Tommy that a friend of Norah's who was helping her was found murdered, and the killer turns out to be her male guardian, who claims he had feelings for her. The family also declares that they will disown her for refusing to return. Tommy confronts Norah's mother, who she figures was the one who ordered the murder. Knowing she can't be arrested, the mother warns Tommy to be careful who she upsets next time.
10	"Packing Heat"	Adam Arkin	Stephen Belber	April 23, 2020	4.62
Tommy's relationship with Kiley becomes strained over a case involving one of her clients, a teenage baseball star caught with an unlicensed gun. When he is given probation instead of jail, Tommy's decision to support him is questioned when photos of her and Kiley are released. Tommy tries to protect Kiley as best she can, but recognizes that it is simply not acceptable for her to be intimate with someone with conflicting business interests. The two mutually agree to break up after talking things over. Donn is also upset by Tommy's choices, feeling that anyone who uses a gun for criminal activity needs to be taken off the street. The teenager soon comes under suspicion for a murder, and while the LAPD determines he was not responsible, his probation is extended for another year. Mayor Grey, to protect himself, announces an ethics investigation of Tommy's actions. Blake is visited by a private investigator who threatens her with photos taken of her in bed with Mayor Grey to make her stop asking questions about Vincent. She reports this to Tommy, who realizes that she may have been unintentionally drawn into a city-wide conspiracy.
11	"This Is Not a Drill"	Eric Laneuville	Carl Capotorto & Lucy Teitler	April 30, 2020	5.10
Tommy begins a secret, informal investigation into the reporter's disappearance and the person who made a threat made to Blake. Cooper recognizes the man that threatened Blake and reaches out to a former colleague, who then brings Cooper into a meeting in which he's told if Tommy is removed Cooper will become the next police chief. During all this, the LAFD is fighting a large wildfire that began by a person disposing of a body in the woods and setting them on fire. Tommy appears before the ethics committee, and is blindsided by a subordinate who lies about that Tommy used her position to stop the investigation into her son-in-law's prostitution arrest. As a result of that, and other apparent improprieties, the ethics committee recommends removing her as police chief which it does.
12	"Cause of Death"	Scott Ellis	Story by : Chris Kappel; Teleplay by : Tom Szentgyörgyi	May 7, 2020	5.35
Following Tommy's termination, her allies, including now-Acting Chief of Police Cooper try to figure out why Vice Commander Rascal Santos lied to the ethics commission which resulted in her firing. Blake and Ken tail former cop Howie Ford, but he catches onto them and steals their evidence before being killed in an accident moments later. Looking further into Ford's activities, they discover a connection to a coroner whom, after being confronted by Tommy and Cooper, gives them the final pieces of the puzzle to tie the entire conspiracy together: years ago, developer tycoon Jonathan Lovell paid Arturo Lopez to help get substandard construction at his Sunset Palace development approved by building inspectors. When a homeless man was subsequently killed in a collapse at the site, top detective Len Egan, acting under Lovell's instruction, paid off the coroner to claim that the deceased was the final victim of the Crenshaw Fireman, a serial killer he had been tracking. When Lopez was about to expose this following his arrest, Lovell paid other inmates to kill him, and when Vincent began investigating, Lovell had Ford kill him as well, then burn his body (causing the prior brush fire from the previous episode in the process), and then bribe the same coroner into falsely ID'ing the body as someone else, while also creating the appearance that Vincent had gone into hiding. To put the final nail in the coffin, Egan and Lovell then blackmailed Santos into getting Tommy fired in exchange for not going public about his own corruption and connections to human trafficking. Egan is brought in for questioning as he is about to flee the city, and after laying out all the evidence before him, Tommy and Cooper persuade him to cooperate in order to retain some of the image of the good cop that he was throughout most of his career in the eyes of his colleagues and peers, instead of the image of another common criminal. Egan flips on Lovell, and the commission, now having with all the facts, reinstates Tommy as police chief. Lovell later shows up at Tommy’s office with an army of lawyers, hinting that he has made a deal in exchange for information he has given to the Department of Justice. But on his way out of HQ, Lovell is unexpectedly gunned down by a disgruntled Santos, who is in turn shot dead by Diaz. Mayor Gray fires Deputy Mayor Dudik for his role in the conspiracy and meets with Tommy in her office, hoping they can unite to run Los Angeles together. Tommy then receives a phone call from the DoJ asking for her cooperation in a new investigation into Gray.

== Production ==
=== Development ===
On May 10, 2019, it was announced that the production had been given a series order. The series premiered on February 6, 2020. On May 6, 2020, CBS canceled the series after one season.

=== Casting ===
In February 2019, it was reported that Edie Falco, Michael Chernus, Russell G. Jones, Olivia Lucy Phillip, and Adelaide Clemens were cast in the pilot's lead roles. In March, it was announced that Joseph Lyle Taylor and David Fierro joined the cast in starring roles. On June 7, 2019, it was reported that Fierro, who was originally cast to play the male lead opposite of Falco in the series, had exited and his role would be recast. On August 5, 2019, Thomas Sadoski was cast as Buddy, replacing Fierro. On August 23, 2019, Vladimir Caamaño joined the cast as a series regular. On November 25, 2019, CBS announced that Katrina Lenk was cast in the recurring role of Kiley Mills. On January 20, 2020, Philip Anthony-Rodriguez was cast in a recurring role.

=== Filming ===
Despite the show being set in Los Angeles, the majority of the filming is done in New York City.

== Release ==
=== Marketing ===
On May 15, 2019, CBS released the first official trailer for the series.

== Reception ==
=== Critical response ===
On Rotten Tomatoes, the series holds an approval rating of 65% based on 20 reviews, with an average rating of 5.67/10. The website's critical consensus reads: "Though its tendency to settle for obvious answers doesn't do it any favors, Tommy remains a decent procedural thanks to a few twists and the endlessly watchable Edie Falco." On Metacritic, it has a weighted average score of 58 out of 100, based on 16 critics, indicating "mixed or average reviews".

=== Ratings ===
Viewership and ratings per episode of Tommy
No.	Title	Air date	Rating (18–49)	Viewers (millions)	DVR (18–49)	DVR viewers (millions)	Total (18–49)	Total viewers (millions)
1	"In Dreams Begin Responsibilities"	February 6, 2020	0.44	4.81	0.25	2.81	0.69	7.59
2	"There Are No Strangers Here"	February 13, 2020	0.40	4.41	0.28	2.89	0.68	7.31
3	"Lifetime Achievement"	February 20, 2020	0.43	4.71	0.31	3.07	0.74	7.78
4	"19 Hour Day"	February 27, 2020	0.48	4.65	0.28	2.90	0.76	7.50
5	"To Take a Hostage"	March 5, 2020	0.53	4.62	0.28	2.80	0.81	7.42
6	"The Ninth Girl"	March 12, 2020	0.51	4.79	0.25	2.74	0.76	7.54
7	"Vic"	April 2, 2020	0.60	5.35	0.23	2.76	0.83	8.11
8	"The Swatting Game"	April 9, 2020	0.57	5.17	0.23	2.74	0.80	7.91
9	"Free to Go"	April 16, 2020	0.51	5.16	0.26	2.68	0.77	7.84
10	"Packing Heat"	April 23, 2020	0.46	4.62	0.23	2.71	0.69	7.32
11	"This Is Not a Drill"	April 30, 2020	0.47	5.10	0.22	2.76	0.69	7.86
12	"Cause of Death"	May 7, 2020	0.50	5.35	0.24	2.63	0.74	7.98
