= Midori Francis =

American actress (born 1994)

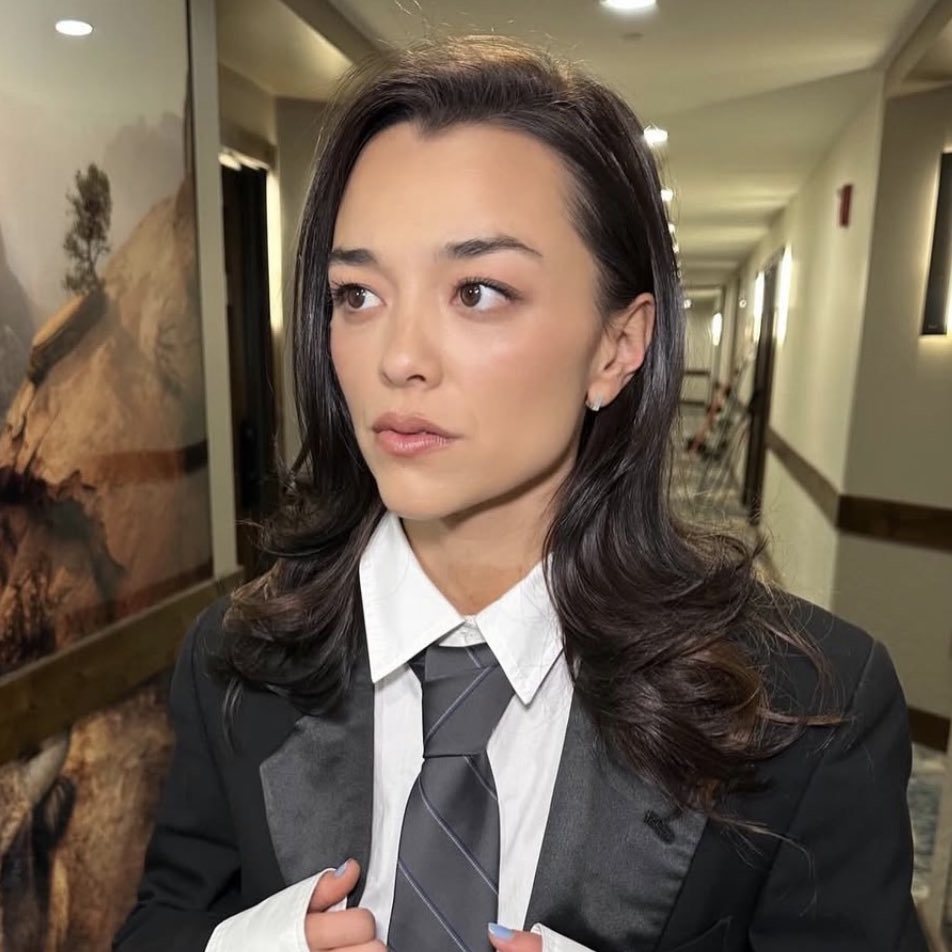
- Midori Francis in 2026
- Born: Midori Anne Iwama; April 16, 1994 (age 32); Lakewood, New Jersey, U.S.
- Education: Rutgers University, New Brunswick (BFA)
- Occupation: Actress
- Years active: 2014−present

Midori Anne Iwama (born April 16, 1994), known professionally as Midori Francis, is an American actress. She began her career in theatre, earning NYIT, Obie, and Drama Desk Awards. She received a Daytime Emmy nomination for her role as Lily in the Netflix series Dash & Lily (2020). She also starred as Dr. Mika Yasuda in Grey's Anatomy (2022–2024). In 2026, she starred in the body horror film Saccharine, for which her performance received critical acclaim and a Special Jury Mention at the Overlook Film Festival.

== Early life and education ==
Francis grew up in Rumson, New Jersey. She is the daughter of Joanne and Ken Iwama, the current Vice President of Indiana University Northwest. Named after her paternal grandmother, Francis is of Japanese descent on her father's side and Irish and Italian on her mother's. On growing up in a predominantly white town in the 1990s and early 2000s, she commented "I was teased a lot for being Asian, I was bullied, made to feel like I was ugly or weird". She identifies as a Hapa.

Francis attended Rumson-Fair Haven Regional High School. She went on to obtain a Bachelor of Fine Arts in acting from the Mason Gross School of the Arts at Rutgers University in 2014. She studied abroad in London, training with Tim Carroll and performing in a production of The Two Gentlemen of Verona at Shakespeare's Globe.

== Career ==
Upon graduating from Rutgers, Francis landed stage roles in regional productions of Vanya and Sonia and Masha and Spike and Peter and the Starcatcher as Nina and Molly respectively. She won Best Actress at the 2016 New York Innovative Theatre Awards as well as receiving a Best Ensemble nomination for her role as Meghan in the Off-Broadway play Connected at 59E59 Theaters. From 2017 to 2018, she was in the original cast of The Wolves, garnering ensemble awards at the Obie and Drama Desk Awards. At the latter, Francis was also nominated for Outstanding Actress in Play for her role in Ming Peiffer's Usual Girls.

In 2018, Francis made her feature film debut in Ocean's 8. The following year, she appeared in South Mountain and Good Boys. In October 2019, it was announced Francis would star in her first lead role opposite Austin Abrams in the 2020 Netflix Christmas romantic comedy series Dash & Lily, an adaptation of the young adult novel by David Levithan and Rachel Cohn. Francis was included in the creative process, as elements from her real life background and experiences were incorporated. For her performance, Francis was nominated for Lead Actress in a Daytime Fiction Program at the 2021 Daytime Emmy Awards.

Francis appeared alongside Victoria Justice in the Netflix fantasy comedy film Afterlife of the Party in 2021. In March 2021, it was announced Francis had joined the main cast of the HBO Max series The Sex Lives of College Girls, which premiered later that year.

In January 2022, Francis was set to star in the TV thriller film Unseen with Jolene Purdy, helmed by Yoko Okumura in her feature directing debut. In July 2022, it was announced that Francis was cast as a series regular for season 19 of ABC's medical drama Grey's Anatomy. She announced she would be leaving the show in 2024.

In December 2024 it was announced Francis would star in the film Saccharine helmed by Relic director Natalie Erika James.

In 2025, Francis returned to the stage in the Classic Stage Company production of Bus Stop, playing Cherie. Her performance received positive notices, with The New York Times calling it "the show's standout performance."

In 2026, Saccharine was released, and Francis' leading performance received critical acclaim. She received a Special Jury Mention at the Overlook Film Festival for her performance.

In 2026, it was announced that Francis would be starring alongside Samira Wiley and Sophia Bush in the upcoming Indie film, The Let Go.

== Personal life ==
She is vocal about Asian representation in media and speaks frequently about her experience as an Asian-American in Hollywood.

She identifies as queer.

== Filmography ==
=== Film ===
Year	Title	Role	Notes
2015	Killing Machine	Angela	Short Film
2018	Ocean's 8	April	
2019	South Mountain	Emme	
2019	Good Boys	Lily	
2019	Chemistry of Mood	Queer Girl	Short Film
2019	Bless This Mess		Short Film
2021	Afterlife of the Party	Lisa	Streaming film
2023	Unseen	Emily	
2023	Complicated Order	Remy	Short Film
2025	My Only Friend Is a Robot Named Beans	Remy	Short Film
2026	Saccharine	Hana	

=== Television ===
Year	Title	Role	Notes
2016	Younger	Lin	Episode: "The Marshmallow Experiment "
2017	Gotham	Emma Hsueh	Episode: "A Dark Knight: A Day in the Narrows"
2018	Divorce	Katie	Episode: "Going, Going... Gone"
2018	Paterno	Riot Interviewee	Television film
2019	The Birch	Lanie Bouchard	Web series; recurring role, 8 episodes
2020	Dash & Lily	Lily	8 episodes, TV Miniseries
2021	The Wolves	#8	TV Movie
2021	Robot Chicken	Solid Snake's Girlfriend; Satine (voice)	Episode: "May Cause Light Cannibalism"
2021–2024	The Sex Lives of College Girls	Alicia	Main role (season 1, 3); Guest role (season 2), 11 episodes
2022–2024	Grey's Anatomy	Dr. Mika Yasuda	Main role; (seasons 19–season 21); 38 episodes
2026	Stranger Things: Tales from '85	Courtney (voice)	3 episodes

=== Stage ===
Year	Title	Role	Notes
2014	Vanya and Sonia and Masha and Spike	Nina	Syracuse Stage, Syracuse
2015	Peter and the Starcatcher	Molly	Wells Theatre, Norfolk, Virginia
2016	Connected	Meghan	59E59 Theaters, Off-Broadway
2017−2018	The Wolves	No. 8	The Duke on 42nd Street, Off-Broadway; Mitzi Newhouse Theater, Off-Broadway; New York Stage and Film, Vassar
2019	Before the Meeting	Nicole	Williamstown Theatre Festival, Williamstown, Massachusetts
2019	Usual Girls	Kyeoung	Roundabout Theatre Company, Off-Broadway
2025	Bus Stop	Cherie	Classic Stage Company, Off-Broadway
2026	Sylvia Sylvia Sylvia	Sylvia	Geffen Playhouse, Los Angeles

=== Awards and nominations ===
Year	Award	Category	Work	Result	Ref.
2016	New York Innovative Theatre Awards	Outstanding Actress	Connected	Won	
2016	New York Innovative Theatre Awards	Outstanding Ensemble	Connected	Nominated	
2017	Obie Awards	Distinguished Performance by an Ensemble	The Wolves	Won	
2017	Drama Desk Awards	Outstanding Ensemble	The Wolves	Won	
2019	Drama Desk Awards	Outstanding Actress in a Play	Usual Girls	Nominated	
2021	Daytime Emmy Awards	Outstanding Lead Actress in a Daytime Fiction Program	Dash & Lily	Nominated	
2026	Overlook Film Festival	Special Jury Mention (Performance)	Saccharine	Won	
