= Julian Works =

American actor

Julian Works is an American actor best known for his roles as Mateo Chavez in the TV series 9-1-1: Lone Star and a role in the 2023 film The Long Game.

== Filmography ==
=== Film ===
Year	Title	Role	Notes
2011	All She Can	Carlos	
2014	House Party: Tonight's the Night	DJ Bootytime	
2014	Paranormal Activity: The Marked Ones	Pablo	
2014	Memory 2.0	Hector	Short film
2015	Babysitter	Carlos	
2016	The Standoff	Jerome Bryant	
2018	Locating Silver Lake	Lil' K	
2018	Beautiful Boy	Gack	
2019	Endings, Beginnings	Terrence	
2022	Mending the Line	Ram	
2023	The Long Game	Joe Treviño	
2026	Jimmy	Second Lieutenant Martinez	

=== Television ===
Year	Title	Role	Notes
2008	Krog	Toby	1 episode
2011	The Closer	Brian Hoyt	1 episode
2012	Southland	Langston	1 episode
2012	Modern Family	Sam	1 episode
2012	Madison High	Dawkins	TV movie
2014	NCIS: Los Angeles	James Martinez	1 episode
2014	The Unauthorized Saved by the Bell Story	Mario Lopez	TV movie
2015	American Crime	Edgar	4 episodes
2016	The Fosters	Javier	1 episode
2017	When We Rise	Tomi	Miniseries
2018	Love	Xander	2 episodes
2018	The Affair	Angel	3 episodes
2018	9-1-1	Marvin	1 episode
2019	Into the Dark	Vic	1 episode
2019	Adam Ruins Everything	Colby	1 episode
2019	Titans	Luis	1 episode
2020–2025	9-1-1: Lone Star	Mateo Chavez/Marvin	Main Cast
