= Jaden Michael =

American actor and model (born 2003)

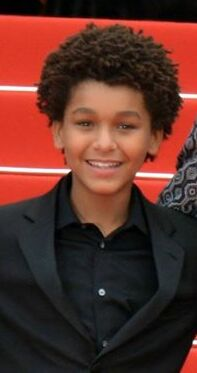
- Michael on the red carpet of Cannes 2017 with the Wonderstruck crew
- Born: October 5, 2003 (age 22); New York City, U.S.
- Occupations: Actor; model
- Years active: 2010–present

Jaden Michael (born October 5, 2003) is an American actor and model. He is known for portraying young Colin Kaepernick in the coming-of-age web series Colin in Black & White (2021), which follows Kaepernick's early years. He played the lead role of Mickey Bolitar in the Prime Video series Harlan Coben's Shelter. He also played Agent Otto in the pilot episode of the PBS/TVO Kids series Odd Squad, though the part was given to Filip Geljo for the remainder of the season.

== Early life and education ==
Michael was born in 2003 to a single mother. The majority of his childhood was spent in New Jersey and Harlem. He was enrolled with Dwight Global Online School for his high school diploma. Michael has said, "I'm Dominican, I'm black, Caribbean descent, and I'm kind of Jewish, my mom's mom's mom is Jewish... so I'm technically Jewish."

== Filmography ==
=== As an actor ===
List of films and characters
| Title | Character | Type | Original Language | Original Year of release | Ref. |
|---|---|---|---|---|---|
| Wonderstruck | Jamie | Film | English | 2017 | |
| Vampires vs. the Bronx | Miguel Martinez | Film | English | 2020 | |
| Colin in Black & White | Colin Kaepernick | Web series | English | 2021 | |
| Harlan Coben's Shelter | Mickey Bolitar | Television series | English | 2023 | |
| The Last Kiss | Evan Geller | Film | English | 2026 | |
| Why Did I Get Married Again? | T.J. | Film | English | 2026 | |

=== As a dubbing artist ===
List of films and characters dubbed
| Title | Character | Dub Language | Original Language | Original Year of release | Ref. |
|---|---|---|---|---|---|
| The Bug Diaries | Lucas | English | English | 2019–2020 | |
