= Natalie Erika James =

Australian-American filmmaker (born 1990)

- Born: 23 February 1990 (age 36); USA
- Occupations: Film director, screenwriter
- Years active: 2010–present

Natalie Erika James (born 23 February 1990) is an Australian-American film director and screenwriter, born in the US and raised in Melbourne. She is best known for her psychological horror feature film debut Relic (2020) and her Rosemary's Baby prequel Apartment 7A (2024).

== Filmography ==
Feature films

Year	Title	Director	Writer	Producer
2020	Relic	Yes	Yes	No
2024	Apartment 7A	Yes	Yes	No
2026	Saccharine	Yes	Yes	Yes

Short films

Year	Title	Director	Writer	Producer	Editor
2010	Observe	No	No	No	Yes
2011	Tritch	Yes	Yes	No	No
2013	Burrow	Yes	Yes	No	Yes
2015	Under the Sun	No	No	Yes	No
2017	Creswick	Yes	Yes	Yes	Yes
2018	Drum Wave	Yes	Yes	No	No
