= Maurice Green (photographer) =

Maurice Green was an Anglo-Indian photographer, born on 21 January 1931 in Simla, British India. He was the second child of Alfred Green (10 April 1907 - 2 October 1979) a Guardsman to King George V and later Captain in the Army of India and Priti Varma (15 June 1910 - 30 March 1980) who came from a family of merchants.

== Early life ==
As a child Maurice travelled across India with his Parents and four siblings, Cyril, Zinia, Lily and Elizabeth. Staying in various cities and provinces, including Bombay, Calcutta and finally, in 1940, settling in the Princely State of Rampur. Whilst in Simla, during the late 1930s, his parents met M. M. Kaye and it is said that they formed part of the inspiration for Kaye's 1978 novel The Far Pavilions.

At an early age Maurice developed a keen interest in photography, which was wholeheartedly encouraged by his mother Priti, who gave him his first camera at the age of 10.

== Career ==
In 1947, at the age of 17 Maurice began work on his first photographic project, which documented the declining grandeur of the Princely states, before they ultimately disappeared following Independence. The book was titled A Gilded Life and finally published in 1957, exactly ten years after India’s independence from British rule. The book was not given great attention at the time, due to the collapse of the publishing company Turner's, however photographs from the book were printed in various magazines and newspapers.

== Personal life ==
In 1952 Maurice married Murial Jones. A month into marriage the couple left India for good, joining Maurice's parents in Sussex, England.

Until his retirement in 1996, Maurice worked for the British army. From the 1980s onwards, he would give several interviews about his book and towards the end of his life he wrote a number of articles, for such newspapers as The Times, about his experiences growing up in colonial India.

He died of lung cancer at his home in 2008.
