= Tangelene Bolton =

American film, TV, and video game composer

Tangelene Bolton (born 1991) is an American film, TV, and video game composer and music producer.

== Early life ==
Tangelene Bolton was born in Upland, California, in 1991 but grew up in Flemington, New Jersey. She was born the daughter of an Irish, English, and Scottish father and a Filipino mother. She started piano lessons at two years old, and as she got older, her passion turned to filmmaking. Bolton attended the Berklee College of Music (2013) where she received her Bachelor of Music in Film Scoring. After graduation, she moved to Los Angeles and started interning at Hans Zimmer's studio, Remote Control Productions, where she was hired. Currently, she works as a freelance composer for film, TV, commercials, and video games. In addition, she has experience as a music producer and conductor.

== Career ==
Bolton's career was launched at Remote Control Productions, where she worked for Hans Zimmer and Henry Jackman. She credits Bobby Tahouri as a mentor. Bolton has provided technical music support or music for the films Girlfriend's Day, Altitude, and No Escape Room; the television series Shimmer and Shine and 60 Days In; and the video game Rise of the Tomb Raider.

In 2017 and 2018, Bolton was invited to conduct her pieces at the Future is Female concerts performed by the Hollywood Chamber Orchestra.

In 2017, Bolton conducted her composition, "Divertimento," and in 2018, Bolton conducted her composition, "You and I".

In 2020, Bolton composed music for the Walt Disney animated short film, "Just a Thought" with director Brian Menz.

In July 2020, she was chosen to work with animated shorts filmmakers at the Sundance Institute new initiative to support Music for Animated Shorts.
