= Hanan Townshend =

- Born: New Zealand
- Occupation: Composer
- Website: hanantownshend.com

Hanan Townshend is a New Zealand-born film composer best known for his work in Terrence Malick films such as The Tree of Life, Knight of Cups, and To the Wonder.

== Career ==
Townshend was a music licensee on Terrence Malick's Palme d'Or winning film The Tree of Life, where he received his first significant recognition. He has composed for numerous feature films, including Malick's 2012 film To the Wonder and more recently, Knight of Cups, starring Christian Bale, Natalie Portman, Cate Blanchett and Imogen Poots. He has scored over a dozen large commercials for brands such as Apple, American Express, Nike and Google. He has also collaborated with producers such as Mike McCarthy and Daniel Lanois.

== Themes and style ==
Townshend's music reflects the broad background of inspiration from which he draws – the poetic soundscapes of his home country, the eager patterns of popular music, and the refinement of classical training and studies in art composition. Because of this, he has a penchant for approaching film music from a less conventional perspective and producing clever, memorable pieces that support just as much the picturesque as they do the auditory experience.

== Filmography ==
Year	Title	Director	Notes
2009	Lya	Nicolas Siegenthaler	Short film
2009	Western Brothers’ Adventure Story	Drew Xanthopoulos	Documentary Short film
2009	Georgie	Drew Xanthopoulos	Short film
2010	The Holy Roller	Patrick Gillies	
2010	By Jude	Angela Chen	Short film
2010	The Finale	Drew Xanthopoulos	Short film
2010	Titans	Nicolas Seigenthaler	Short film
2011	Little Lions	Tony Costello	Short film
2011	The Tree of Life	Terrence Malick	As music licensee
2011	When We Fell	Drew Xanthopoulos	Short film
2011	White Gloves	Courtney Stephens	Documentary Short film
2012	To the Wonder	Terrence Malick	
2012	Maybe	Pedro Resende	Short film
2012	American Tintype	Matt Morris	Short film
2013	Dewars “Live True” Campaign	Nacho Gayán	TV Commercial
2013	The Curiosity Collective	Ditore Mayo Entertainment	Web Video
2013	Loves Her Gun	Geoff Marslett	
2013	Sunny Square	Hammad Rivzi	Short film
2013	Vultures of Tibet	Russell O. Bush	Documentary short film
2014	The Better Angels	A. J. Edwards	
2014	Believe Me	Will Bakke	
2014	Apple “Your Verse” Campaign	TBWA\Media Arts Lab	TV Commercial
2015	Knight of Cups	Terrence Malick	
2015	American Express ‘Mindy Kaling’s Journery’	Ogilvy & Mather	TV commercial
2015	Echoes of War	Kane Senes	
2015	Google ‘Expeditions	Google Education	Web Video
2015	Nike ‘Re:RUN’	Nike	Short film
2015	Avon ‘Beauty Lovers Wanted’	Avon	Web video
2016	Heaven Sent	Michael Landon Jr.	
2016	The Vessel	Julio Quintana	
2016	Voyage of Time	Terrence Malick	Documentary
2016	Hybrid Vigor	Brandon Fowler	
2017	Song to Song	Terrence Malick	Additional Music Composer
2017	Strawberry Land	Wiktor Ericsson	
2017	Disgraced	Pat Kondelis	Documentary
2020	The Book of Vision	Carlo S. Hintermann	
2020	Outcry (mini-series)	Pat Kondelis	American television documentary series
2021	Blue Miracle	Julio Quintana	
2025	Deep Quiet Room	Ko-shang Shen	
