= Abraham's Boys =

Abraham's Boys may refer to:

- Abraham's Boys (short story), a short story by Joe Hill
- Abraham's Boys (film), a 2025 American horror film, based on the short story
