= List of 2011 box office number-one films in Ireland =

== Box office number-one films in 2011 ==
This is a list of films which have placed number one at the weekend box office in the Republic of Ireland during 2011.

†	This implies the highest-grossing movie of the year.

#	Date	Film	Total weekend gross (Euro)	Distributed by	Notes
2	January 9, 2011	Little Fockers	€218,947	Paramount	Little Fockers reached No. 1 in its third weekend of release.
3	January 16, 2011	The Green Hornet	TBD	Sony	
4	January 23, 2011	Black Swan	€273,517	20th Century Fox	Black Swan reached No. 1 in its first weekend of release.
5	January 30, 2011	Tangled	€573,723	Disney	Tangled reached No. 1 in its first weekend of release.
6	February 6, 2011	Tangled	€548,367	Disney	Tangled remained #1 in its second weekend of release.
7	February 13, 2011	True Grit	€257,940	Paramount	True Grit reached No. 1 in its first weekend of release.
8	February 20, 2011	Paul	€273,681	Universal	Paul reached No. 1 in its first weekend of release.
9	February 27, 2011	Yogi Bear	€174,858	Warner Bros.	Yogi Bear reached No. 1 in its third weekend of release.
10	March 6, 2011	The Adjustment Bureau	€187,019	Universal	The Adjustment Bureau reached No. 1 in its first weekend of release.
11	March 13, 2011	The Adjustment Bureau	TBD	Universal	
12	March 20, 2011	The Adjustment Bureau	TBD	Universal	
13	March 27, 2011	Limitless	€195,806	Paramount	Limitless reached No. 1 in its first weekend of release.
14	April 3, 2011	Hop	€193,546	Universal	Hop reached No. 1 in its first weekend of release.
15	April 10, 2011	Rio	€133,261	20th Century Fox	Rio reached No. 1 in its first weekend of release.
16	April 17, 2011	Scream 4	€186,073	Outerbanks Entertainment	Scream 4 reached No. 1 in its first weekend of release.
17	April 24, 2011	Fast & Furious 5	€509,352	Universal	Fast and Furious 5 reached No. 1 in its first weekend of release.
18	May 1, 2011	Fast & Furious 5	TBD	Universal	
19	May 8, 2011	Hanna	€197,470	Universal	Hanna reached No. 1 in its first weekend of release.
20	May 15, 2011	Hanna	TBD	Universal	
21	May 22, 2011	Pirates of the Caribbean: On Stranger Tides	€657,932	Disney	Pirates of the Caribbean: On Stranger Tides reached No. 1 in its first weekend of release.
22	May 29, 2011	The Hangover Part II	€896,189	Warner Bros.	The Hangover Part II reached No. 1 in its first weekend of release.
23	June 5, 2011	The Hangover Part II	TBD	Warner Bros.	
24	June 12, 2011	The Hangover Part II	TBD	Warner Bros.	
25	June 19, 2011	Bad Teacher	€258,264	Sony	Bad Teacher reached No. 1 in its first weekend of release.
26	June 26, 2011	Bridesmaids	€542,639	Universal	Bridesmaids reached No. 1 in its first weekend of release.
27	July 3, 2011	Transformers: Dark of the Moon	€460,135	Paramount	Transformers: Dark of the Moon reached No. 1 in its first weekend of release.
28	July 10, 2011	The Guard	€431,532	Element Pictures	The Guard reached No. 1 in its first weekend of release.
29	July 17, 2011	Harry Potter and the Deathly Hallows – Part 2 †	€1,548,203	Warner Bros.	Harry Potter and the Deathly Hallows - Part 2 reached No. 1 in its first weekend of release.
30	July 24, 2011	Harry Potter and the Deathly Hallows – Part 2 †	€434,934	Warner Bros.	Harry Potter and the Deathly Hallows - Part 2 remained #1 in its second weekend of release.
31	July 31, 2011	Captain America: The First Avenger	€254,439	Paramount	Captain America: The First Avenger reached No. 1 in its first weekend of release.
32	August 7, 2011	Super 8	€282,570	Paramount	Super 8 reached No. 1 in its first weekend of release.
33	August 14, 2011	Rise of the Planet of the Apes	€507,262	20th Century Fox	Rise of the Planet of the Apes reached No. 1 in its first weekend of release.
34	August 21, 2011	The Inbetweeners Movie	€604,568	Entertainment Film Distributors	The Inbetweeners Movie reached No. 1 in its first weekend of release.
35	August 28, 2011	The Inbetweeners Movie	€393,271	Entertainment Film Distributors	The Inbetweeners Movie remained #1 in its second weekend of release.
36	September 4, 2011	The Inbetweeners Movie	€249,127	Entertainment Film Distributors	The Inbetweeners Movie remained #1 in its third weekend of release.
37	September 11, 2011	Friends with Benefits	€195,853	Sony	Friends with Benefits reached No. 1 in its first weekend of release.
38	September 18, 2011	Tinker Tailor Soldier Spy	€160,759	StudioCanal	Tinker Tailor Soldier Spy reached No. 1 in its first weekend of release.
39	September 25, 2011	Tinker Tailor Soldier Spy	€163,603	StudioCanal	Tinker Tailor Soldier Spy remained #1 in its second weekend of release.
40	October 2, 2011	Tinker Tailor Soldier Spy	€126,170	StudioCanal	Tinker Tailor Soldier Spy remained #1 in its third weekend of release.
41	October 9, 2011	Johnny English Reborn	€389,027	Universal	Johnny English Reborn reached No. 1 in its first weekend of release.
42	October 16, 2011	Johnny English Reborn	€265,442	Universal	Johnny English Reborn remained #1 in its second weekend of release.
43	October 23, 2011	Paranormal Activity 3	€308,975	Paramount	Paranormal Activity 3 reached No. 1 in its second weekend of release.
44	October 30, 2011	The Adventures of Tintin: The Secret of the Unicorn	€188,375	Paramount	The Adventures of Tintin: The Secret of the Unicorn reached No. 1 in its first weekend of release.
45	November 6, 2011	Tower Heist	€218,223	Universal	Tower Heist reached No. 1 in its first weekend of release.
46	November 13, 2011	Arthur Christmas	€217,014	Sony	Arthur Christmas reached No. 1 in its first weekend of release.
47	November 20, 2011	The Twilight Saga: Breaking Dawn – Part 1	€1,147,772	eOne Films	The Twilight Saga: Breaking Dawn Part 1 reached No. 1 in its first weekend of release.
48	November 27, 2011	The Twilight Saga: Breaking Dawn – Part 1	€399,814	eOne Films	The Twilight Saga: Breaking Dawn Part 1 remained #1 in its second weekend of release.
49	December 4, 2011	Happy Feet 2	€172,584	Warner Bros.	
50	December 11, 2011	Puss in Boots	€206,697	Paramount	
51	December 18, 2011	Mission: Impossible – Ghost Protocol	€236,151	Paramount	
52	December 25, 2011	War Horse	€213,697	Disney	

== Top Grossing Films per total weekend gross ==
#	Film	Date	Total weekend gross (Euro)
1	Harry Potter and the Deathly Hallows – Part 2	July 17, 2011	€1,548,203
2	The Hangover Part II	May 29, 2011	€896,189
3	Pirates of the Caribbean: On Stranger Tides	May 22, 2011	€657,932
4	The Inbetweeners Movie	August 21, 2011	€604,568
5	Tangled	January 30, 2011	€573,723
6	Tangled	February 6, 2011	€548,367
7	Bridesmaids	June 26, 2011	€542,639
8	Fast & Furious 5	April 24, 2011	€509,352
9	Rise of the Planet of the Apes	August 14, 2011	€507,262
10	Transformers: Dark of the Moon	July 3, 2011	€460,135

== Films per No. 1 Box Office Placements ==
#	Film	No. of Weeks
1	The Inbetweeners Movie	3
1	Tinker Tailor Soldier Spy	3
3	Harry Potter and the Deathly Hallows – Part 2	2
3	Johnny English Reborn	2
3	Tangled	2

== Distributors per No. 1 Box Office Placements ==
#	Distributor	No. of Box Office Placements
1	Universal Studios	9
2	Paramount	8
3	Warner Bros.	4
4	Disney	3
4	20th Century Fox	3
4	Entertainment Film Distributors	3
4	Sony	3
4	StudioCanal	3
9	Element Pictures	1
9	Outerbanks Entertainment	1

== See also ==
- List of Irish films — Irish films by year
