= High Point Christian Academy =

School in North Carolina, United States

Location
- 800 Phillips Avenue; High Point, North Carolina 27262; United States; 35°56′59″N 80°01′21″W

Information
- Type: Private; Independent; college-preparatory; Christian school
- Religious affiliation: Christianity
- Denomination: Baptist
- Established: 1996 (30 years ago)
- Founder: Green Street Baptist Church
- Status: Open
- CEEB code: 341848
- Head of school: Jeremy Blackstock
- Staff: 120
- Teaching staff: 47.9 (on an FTE basis)
- Grades: Pre-Kindergarten–12
- Gender: Co-educational
- Enrollment: 900
- Average class size: 18
- Student to teacher ratio: 12.9 (2005–06)
- Hours in school day: 7
- Campus type: Suburban
- Colors: Navy & green
- Athletics: North Carolina Independent Schools Athletic Association (NCISAA)
- Athletics conference: Piedmont Triad Athletic Conference (PTAC)
- Sports: baseball, basketball, cross country, cheerleading, football, golf, soccer, softball, swimming, tennis, track & field, volleyball
- Mascot: Kip the Cougar
- Nickname: Cougars
- Rival: Wesleyan Christian Academy; Greensboro Day School
- Accreditation: SACS; ACSI; Cognia
- Tuition: International students: $16,900; PK-12: $11,800 (2024–25)
- Website: www.hpcacougars.org

High Point Christian Academy (HPCA) is a private, college preparatory, Christian school located in High Point, North Carolina, United States. HPCA serves students in grades Pre-Kindergarten through twelfth Grade.

== History ==
Founded by the Green Street Baptist Church, High Point Christian Academy opened in August 1996 with 96 students in kindergarten through third grade. One grade was added per year which made the first graduating class the class of 2006. The school had added its high school program with the 2002–2003 school year. There are now 900 students in attendance and close to 1,000 alumni.

== Admissions ==
The Admissions process at High Point Christian Academy varies. For transitional kindergarten students applicants must be at least five years of age before their school year. Grades 1–12 admissions are based on the students recent report cards, standardized test scores, while grades 6–12 applicants must provide information from the previous school where the student most recently attended. For applicants seeking admission in grades 10–12 must submit a copy of their high school transcript and conduct an interview with the principal at HPCA. Candidates will receive a notification on their status for admission.

== Student life ==
Student life at High Point Christian Academy include students participating in numerous opportunities at school, chapels, clubs, and honor societies.

Elementary school students are required to participate in a grade level missions project, middle school students participate in the Servant Heart project that helps support the purpose of serving others, while high school students participate in the Life of Influence project, where helps students develop throughout their time in high school.

== Extracurricular activities ==
=== Athletics ===
High Point Christian Academy fields teams in baseball, basketball, cheerleading, cross country, football, golf, soccer, softball, swimming, tennis, track and volleyball. The Cougars field 33 competitive athletic teams in these 12 different sports and compete at the 3A level in the Piedmont Triad Athletic Conference (PTAC) and North Carolina Independent Schools Athletic Association (NCISAA).

The first teams in the school's history were the boys' and girls' basketball teams, which began in the 1999–2000 winter season. In 2015–16 season the boys varsity team received national attention by adding five-star recruit Edrice Adebayo.

=== Fine arts ===
High Point Christian Academy provides a fine arts program which includes art, band, drama, publications and chorus.

== Notable alumni ==
- Bam Adebayo (2016) — NBA player, three-time NBA All-Star
- Lance Boykin (2018) — NFL cornerback
- Brady Hepner — Portrays Diller Hopkins on the Netflix series The Waterfront
