= 9-1-1: Lone Star =

American television series (2020–2025)

- Genre: Procedural drama; Action
- Created by: Ryan Murphy; Brad Falchuk; Tim Minear
- Starring: Rob Lowe; Liv Tyler; Ronen Rubinstein; Sierra McClain; Jim Parrack; Natacha Karam; Brian Michael Smith; Rafael L. Silva; Julian Works; Gina Torres; Brianna Baker; Kelsey Yates; Skyler Yates; Jackson Pace
- Composers: Mac Quayle; Todd Haberman; Justin Burnett
- Country of origin: United States
- Original language: English
- No. of seasons: 5
- No. of episodes: 72 (list of episodes)

Production
- Executive producers: Ryan Murphy; Brad Falchuk; Tim Minear; Rob Lowe; Angela Bassett; Bradley Buecker; John J. Gray; Rashad Raisani; Alexis Martin Woodall; Trey Callaway
- Cinematography: Andrew Strahorn
- Running time: 42–48 minutes
- Production companies: ReamWorks; Brad Falchuk Teley-Vision; Ryan Murphy Television; 20th Television (Note: Credited as 20th Century Fox Television for season 1.)

Original release
- Network: Fox
- Release: January 19, 2020 – February 3, 2025

Related
- 9-1-1; 9-1-1: Nashville

9-1-1: Lone Star is an American procedural drama television series that aired on Fox from January 19, 2020, to February 3, 2025. Created by Ryan Murphy, Brad Falchuk, and Tim Minear, the series is a spin-off of the American procedural drama television series 9-1-1, and was ordered by Fox in May 2019.

In May 2023, the series was renewed for a fifth and final season, which premiered on September 23, 2024, and concluded on February 3, 2025.

== Premise ==
As with 9-1-1, the series follows the personal and professional lives of first responders and 911 dispatchers. The show focuses on former New York City firefighter Owen Strand (Rob Lowe), who is tasked with rebuilding the team of Austin's Station 126 after all but one of its members were killed in a freak accident—just as he had done as an FDNY captain in Manhattan following the September 11 attacks.

== Cast and characters ==
=== Overview ===
Actor	Character	Seasons				
Actor	Character	1	2	3	4	5
Rob Lowe	Owen Strand	Main	Main	Main	Main	Main
Liv Tyler	Michelle Blake	Main				
Ronen Rubinstein	Tyler Kennedy "TK" Strand	Main	Main	Main	Main	Main
Sierra McClain	Grace Ryder	Main	Main	Main	Main	
Jim Parrack	Judson "Judd" Ryder	Main	Main	Main	Main	Main
Natacha Karam	Marjan Marwani	Main	Main	Main	Main	Main
Brian Michael Smith	Paul Strickland	Main	Main	Main	Main	Main
Rafael L. Silva	Carlos Reyes	Main	Main	Main	Main	Main
Julian Works	Mateo Chavez	Main	Main	Main	Main	Main
Gina Torres	Tommy Vega		Main	Main	Main	Main
Brianna Baker	Nancy Gillian	Recurring	Recurring	Main	Main	Main
Kelsey Yates	Isabella "Izzy" Vega		Guest	Main	Main	Main
Skyler Yates	Evie Vega		Guest	Main	Main	Main
Jackson Pace	Wyatt Harris			Recurring	Recurring	Main

=== Main ===
- Rob Lowe as Owen Strand, a firefighter captain from New York City and TK's father. He was diagnosed with lung cancer as a result of being a first responder to the September 11 attacks, in which he also lost his entire firehouse. Having rebuilt his team in New York City, he was asked to do the same for the 126 in Austin.
- Liv Tyler as Michelle Blake (season 1), the paramedic Emergency Medical Services (EMS) captain. She is trying to locate her sister Iris, who has been missing for three years. In the second season, she is revealed to have left the 126 to help homeless people with mental illness like her sister.
- Ronen Rubinstein as Tyler Kennedy "TK" Strand, a dual-certified firefighter-paramedic with the 126. He is a recovering opioid addict and Captain Strand's son, who overdosed just prior to his arrival in Austin. He starts a relationship with police officer Carlos Reyes. In season two, he quit being a firefighter and became a paramedic. At the end of season three, he proposed to Carlos and the two marry in the fourth-season finale.
- Sierra McClain as Grace Ryder (née Williams; seasons 1–4), a 9-1-1 operator and Judd's wife
- Jim Parrack as Judson "Judd" Ryder, a firefighter and Grace's husband. Judd is the sole survivor of previous 126 team's fire disaster.
- Natacha Karam as Marjan Marwani, a firefighter and paramedic. Marjan is an adrenaline junkie, a devout Muslim, and an Instagram celebrity.
- Brian Michael Smith as Paul Strickland, a firefighter and paramedic who is a trans man
- Rafael L. Silva as Carlos Reyes, a police officer with the Austin Police Department who begins a romantic relationship with TK (Note: Silva is credited as Rafael Silva in seasons 1–2 and as Rafael L. Silva from season 3.)
- Julian Works as Mateo Chavez, a dyslexic DREAMer who must keep his job or be deported. He burned down a school when he was 13, but his cousin Marvin voluntarily went to juvenile punishment for him.
- Gina Torres as Tommy Vega (seasons 2–5), an EMS captain who replaces Michelle. The mother of twin daughters, she re-entered the workforce after eight years to support her family when COVID-19 caused her husband's restaurant to close.
- Brianna Baker as Nancy Gillian (recurring, seasons 1–2; main, seasons 3–5), a paramedic who is a member of the Rescue 126 EMS crew
- Kelsey Yates as Isabella "Izzy" Vega (guest, season 2; main, seasons 3–5), (Note: Formerly portrayed by Lexi Crouch) Tommy's daughter and Evie's twin sister
- Skyler Yates as Evie Vega (guest, season 2; main seasons 3–5), (Note: Formerly portrayed by Xandi Crouch) Tommy's daughter and Izzy's twin sister
- Jackson Pace as Wyatt Harris (recurring seasons 3–4; main season 5), Judd's son

=== Recurring ===
- Kyle Secor as Deputy Chief Alden Radford (season 1; guest season 2), a fire chief who convinces Owen to come to Austin to rebuild Station 126
- Mark Elias as Timothy M. Rosewater (seasons 1–2), a paramedic who is also a member of Rescue 126 EMS crew
- Jon Foster as Dustin Shepard (season 1), an ex-boyfriend of Michelle Blake's missing sister
- Brett Rice as Wayne Gettinger (season 1), an elderly man who is receiving chemotherapy treatments at the same time as Owen
- Mary Kay Place as Theresa Blake (season 1), Michelle's mother
- Natalie Zea as Zoe (season 1), a psychology professor at the University of Texas at Austin. She meets Owen at a beauty supply store and later begins dating him.
- Billy Burke as Captain/later Deputy Chief William "Billy" Tyson (seasons 1 and 3; guest season 2), a former firefighter for the 126 who also has cancer
- Tamala Jones as Det. Sarina Washington (season 1; guest seasons 3–4), a detective with the Austin Police Department
- Lyndsy Fonseca as Iris Blake (seasons 1 and 4), Michelle's missing sister
- Lisa Edelstein as Gwyneth "Gwyn" Morgan (seasons 2–3; guest season 4), Owen's ex-wife and TK's mother, who arrives in Austin after her son's hospitalization
- Derek Webster as Charles Vega (season 2; guest season 5), Tommy's husband
- Lexi Crouch as Isabella "Izzy" Vega (season 2), (Note: Later portrayed by Kelsey Yates) Tommy's and Charles' daughter and Evie's twin sister
- Xandi Crouch as Evie Vega (season 2), (Note: Later portrayed by Skyler Yates) Tommy's and Charles' daughter and Izzy's twin sister
- Benito Martinez as Gabriel Reyes (seasons 2 and 4; guest season 3), Carlos's father and a Texas Ranger
- Roxana Brusso as Andrea Reyes (seasons 2 and 4; guest season 3), Carlos's mother
- Todd Stashwick as Dennis Raymond (season 2), an arson investigator who is later revealed to be a serial arsonist himself
- Jack Conley as Captain Jack Tatum (guest season 2; season 3), Captain at station 129
- Julie Benz as Sadie Becker (season 3), a woman who rents the cabin next to Owen's
- Carly Dutcher as Lindsey Robertson (season 3), a teenage woman Paul saves
- Amy Acker as Catherine Harper (season 3), Chief of staff for the governor of Texas who meets Owen through a dating app
- Robyn Lively as Marlene Harris (seasons 3 and 5; guest season 4), the mother of Judd's son, Wyatt
- Nathan Owens as Julius Vega (season 3), Charles' brother and Tommy's brother-in-law
- Neal McDonough as Sgt. Ty O'Brien (guest season 3; season 4), the Austin PD Sergeant First Grade who is known for both his by the book approach and his dislike of firefighters
- Amanda Schull as Special Agent Rose Casey (season 4), an FBI agent investigating members of an extremist group, with Owen's help
- D. B. Woodside as Trevor Parks (seasons 4–5), the new pastor at Tommy's church who becomes her love interest
- Bella Blanding as Melody Parks (season 4–5), the daughter of Trevor Parks
- Ashley Rae Spillers as Lila Gerald (season 4), a woman Marjan saves who later sues her
- Jamison Webb as Mitch Gerald (season 4), a man Marjan saves who later sues her
- Michaela McManus as Kendra Harrington (season 4), a charitable billionaire heiress who is Owen's love interest
- Amanda Payton as Jasmine Asha Fulton (season 4), AFD Department Advocate at the 126
- Chad Lowe as Robert Strand (guest season 3; season 4), Owen's brother who has Huntington's disease
- Andy Favreau as Pearce Risher (guest seasons 2–3; season 4), an egotistical paramedic who works briefly at the 126 then is employed by a private ambulance service
- Alan Autry as Chief Bridges (guest season 4; season 5), the former boss of Gabriel Reyes who also becomes Carlos's boss when the latter joins the Texas Rangers
- Parker Young as Sam Campbell (season 5), an Army veteran and Gabriel's former partner with the Rangers. He is initially skeptical of Carlos's abilities as a Ranger, but later develops respect for him.

=== Guest ===
- Alex Carter as Captain (season 1), the former captain of the 126 who is killed in the explosion
- Jesse Luken as Jake Harkes (season 1), one of the former members of the 126 who is killed in the explosion
- Matt McTighe as Chuck Parkland (season 1), one of the former members of the 126 who is killed in the explosion
- Graham Shiels as Cory Garrity (season 1), one of the former members of the 126 who is killed in the explosion
- Angel Parker as Josie (season 1), a woman who Paul meets on a call
- Barry Corbin as Stuart Ryder (seasons 1–3), Judd Ryder's father
- Sharif Atkins as Victor (season 2), a real estate agent that fell into a volcanic sinkhole while playing mini golf with his family
- Mena Massoud as Salim (season 2), Marjan's childhood friend to whom she has been arranged to be married since they were twelve
- William Allen Young as Benjamin Williams (season 2 and 4), Grace's father
- Barbara Eve Harris as Denice Williams (season 2 and 4), Grace's mother
- Bart Johnson as Stanley (season 3), Marlene's fiancé and Wyatt's future stepfather
- Adam Baldwin as Det. Brian McGregor (seasons 4 and 5), Austin PD detective
- Peyton List as Ashlyn Campbell (season 5), Sam Campbell's wife

=== Crossover cast ===
Regular cast members of the original 9-1-1:

- Aisha Hinds as Henrietta "Hen" Wilson (special guest, season 2), L.A. firefighter and paramedic
- Ryan Guzman as Edmundo "Eddie" Díaz (special guest, season 2), L.A. firefighter
- Oliver Stark as Evan "Buck" Buckley (special guest, season 2), L.A. firefighter
- Angela Bassett as Athena Grant-Nash (special guest, season 3), LAPD patrol sergeant

== Episodes ==
Season	Episodes	Originally released		Rank	Viewership (millions)
Season	Episodes	First released	Last released	Rank	Viewership (millions)
1	10	January 19, 2020	March 9, 2020	25	9.09
2	14	January 18, 2021	May 24, 2021	15	8.71
3	18	January 3, 2022	May 16, 2022	20	7.43
4	18	January 24, 2023	May 16, 2023	35	5.73
5	12	September 23, 2024	February 3, 2025	69	7.1

== Production ==
=== Development ===
On May 12, 2019, it was announced that Fox had given the production a series order for a 9-1-1 spin-off. 9-1-1 creators Ryan Murphy, Brad Falchuk, and Tim Minear would serve as executive producers along with cast member Rob Lowe. Angela Bassett, who starred in the original 9-1-1 series, serves as a co-executive producer, while Lowe's son John Owen also works on the show's writing team. It was the final ordered drama developed for Fox with 20th Television as a sister division, as the acquisition of 21st Century Fox by Disney had been completed almost two months before on March 20.

On April 13, 2020, Fox renewed the series for a second season which premiered on January 18, 2021. On May 17, 2021, Fox renewed the series for a third season which premiered January 3, 2022. On May 16, 2022, Fox renewed the series for a fourth season which premiered on January 24, 2023. On May 1, 2023, Fox renewed the series for a fifth season. On November 15, 2023, it was announced that the fifth season of 9-1-1: Lone Star was pushed to fall 2024, amid the 2023 Writers Guild of America strike and the 2023 SAG-AFTRA strike. The fifth season then premiered on September 23, 2024, and concluded on February 3, 2025. On September 5, 2024, it was announced that the fifth season would be its final season.

=== Casting ===
On May 12, 2019, it was announced that Rob Lowe had been cast in the series as lead role. On September 11, 2019, Liv Tyler was announced to star opposite of Lowe. Jim Parrack joined the cast on September 18, 2019. Two days later, Ronen Rubinstein and Sierra McClain were announced to have joined the cast. On September 23, 2019, Natacha Karam, Brian Michael Smith, Rafael L. Silva, and Julian Works joined the cast.

On September 3, 2020, Gina Torres was cast as a series regular for the second season. On September 22, 2020, Liv Tyler departed the show prior to the second season. Tyler had been commuting between her London home and Los Angeles to film the show. Due to potential travel difficulties of the coronavirus pandemic and not wanting to be away from her young children for long, she asked producers to let her out of her multi-year contract. The possibility of her return was left open. Lisa Edelstein was cast in a recurring role for the second season. On October 8, 2020, Derek Webster joined the cast in a recurring capacity for the second season. On May 25, 2021, Brianna Baker was promoted to series regular for the third season. On September 28, 2022, Neal McDonough, D.B. Woodside, and Amanda Schull joined the cast in recurring capacities for the fourth season.

On June 7, 2024, it was reported that original cast member, Sierra McClain, would not be returning as Grace Ryder ahead of the series' fifth season, due to a cast renegotiation dispute.

=== Filming ===
Although set in Austin, Texas, nearly all filming of the series occurs in Los Angeles, California. The lack of on-location filming in Austin has prompted criticism from the local film industry, claiming that Austin has the production infrastructure to host the series.

The fifth season started shooting in early March 2024, and wrapped in late July 2024.

== Reception ==
=== Critical response ===
On Rotten Tomatoes, the series' first season has an approval rating of 77% based on 13 reviews, with an average rating of 6.8/10. The website's critical consensus reads, "If not as outlandishly fun as its predecessor, 9-1-1: Lone Star still packs an entertaining punch and is a great showcase for the handsomely self-aware Rob Lowe." On Metacritic, the season has a weighted average score of 67 out of 100 based on 8 critics' reviews, indicating "generally favorable reviews".

Daniel D'Addario of Variety suggests that the series "started from the casting" but that it is not misconceived and is as solid as its predecessor, even if aspects of its conceit are "at times so utopian as to defy belief." He praises the "charismatic and inclusive ensemble" and hopes that the series will make use of them and not focus too much on its lead actor. Daniel Fienberg of The Hollywood Reporter called the series fun and thrilling, stating its succeeds as a solid franchise companion, "full of explosions, infernos and death-defying stunts, but most of it is delivered in the attempted service of a more complicated series of character studies, an admirable goal not always smoothly executed." Kelly Lawler of USA Today praised the ensemble cast, and said that producers Minear and Falchuck have "clearly tapped into what worked in "9-1-1," transplanted it easily to Texas and found a way to give "Lone Star" a tone and atmosphere all its own." Brian Tallerico of RogerEbert.com wrote: "There's something almost impressively brazen about the way these shows use melodrama, embracing it like old-fashioned soap opera writers." Joel Keller of Decider said " If you loved 9-1-1, you'll love this show." Keller praised the performances of the actors and the action sequences, complimented the dialogue and the development of the characters.

Amanda Bell of TV Guide rated Lone Star 3.5 out of 5 and stated the series manages to find its own identity without duplicating 9-1-1, called the series inclusive through the diversity of the characters, and said the series celebrates Texas's culture. Melissa Camacho of Common Sense Media rated the series 3 out of 5 stars, complimented the depiction of positive messages and role models, stating the series highlights friendship, teamwork, and community across its characters, while noting the diverse representations.

Sean O'Neal of Texas Monthly criticized the show for its stereotypical portrayal of Texas, and the "baffling" choice of Austin for a conservative Texas setting.

=== Ratings ===
9-1-1: Lone Star premiered in January 2020, with a special two-night series debut on Fox, following the NFC Championship game. The premiere earned a 3.2 rating among adults 18–49 and 11.5 million viewers in time zone-adjusted ratings. The series returned for a new episode in January 2022, bringing in a 0.6 rating among adults 18-49 and 4.86 million viewers. This represented a minor decline from its previous week's episode, which earned a 0.7 rating and 5.25 million viewers. The Season 3 finale attracted 4.54 million viewers with a 0.6 demo rating, showing minimal change from its season premiere. The final season of 9-1-1: Lone Star averaged 7.1 million multi-platform viewers over a 35-day window, ranking 69th among broadcast and streaming programs for the 2024–2025 season. On broadcast alone, the series drew an average of 2.813 million viewers per episode.

Viewership and ratings per season of 9-1-1: Lone Star
Season	Timeslot (ET)	Episodes	First aired		Last aired		TV season	Viewership rank	Avg. viewers (millions)	18–49 rank	Avg. 18–49 rating
Season	Timeslot (ET)	Episodes	Date	Viewers (millions)	Date	Viewers (millions)	TV season	Viewership rank	Avg. viewers (millions)	18–49 rank	Avg. 18–49 rating
1	Monday 8:00 p.m. (Note: The series premiere aired outside of its regular timeslot, on Sunday at 10:00 p.m.)	10	January 19, 2020	11.41	March 9, 2020	5.38	2019–20	24	9.09	13 (Note: Tied with The Good Doctor.)	1.8
2	Monday 9:00 p.m.	14	January 18, 2021	6.03	May 24, 2021	5.21	2020–21	15	8.71	11 (Note: Tied with Chicago Fire and Law & Order: Organized Crime.)	1.5
3	Monday 8:00 p.m. (1–10); Monday 9:00 p.m. (11–18)	18	January 3, 2022	5.50	May 16, 2022	4.63	2021–22	20 (Note: Tied with La Brea.)	7.43	16 (Note: Tied with Law & Order: Organized Crime, The Amazing Race, Ghosts, American Idol – Monday, The Bachelorette, FBI, Young Sheldon, Next Level Chef, The Voice and 60 Minutes.)	1.0
4	Tuesday 8:00 p.m.	18	January 24, 2023	3.92	May 16, 2023	3.32	2022–23	35	5.73	25 (Note: Tied with Bachelor in Paradise and Law & Order: Organized Crime.)	0.8
5	Monday 8:00 p.m.	12	September 23, 2024	3.04	February 3, 2025	3.34	2024–25	37	7.11	18	1.35

=== Accolades ===
Award	Year	Category	Nominee(s)	Result	Ref.
BMI Film & TV Awards	2020	BMI TV Music Award	Mac Quayle	Won	
GLAAD Media Awards	2021	Outstanding Drama Series	9-1-1: Lone Star	Nominated	
GLAAD Media Awards	2022	Outstanding Drama Series	9-1-1: Lone Star	Nominated	
GLAAD Media Awards	2023	Outstanding Drama Series	9-1-1: Lone Star	Won	
Hollywood Critics Association TV Awards	2022	Best Broadcast Network Series, Drama	9-1-1: Lone Star	Nominated	
Primetime Creative Arts Emmy Awards	2022	Outstanding Stunt Coordination for a Drama Series, Limited or Anthology Series or Movie	Buddy Sosthand	Nominated	
ReFrame Stamp	2021	IMDbPro Top 200 Scripted TV Recipients	9-1-1: Lone Star	Won	
Visual Effects Society Awards	2022	Outstanding Supporting Visual Effects in a Photoreal Episode	Brigitte Bourque, Tyler Deck, Jason Gottlieb, Josephine Noh, and Elia Popov (for "Hold the Line")	Nominated	
