= Rafael L. Silva =

American-Brazilian actor (born 1994)

- Born: June 18, 1994 (age 32); Belo Horizonte, Minas Gerais, Brazil
- Education: Pace University
- Occupation: Actor
- Years active: 2015–present

Rafael L. Silva (born June 18, 1994) is a Brazilian actor. He is best known for his role as Carlos Reyes, in the television series 9-1-1: Lone Star (2020-2025).

== Biography ==
Silva was born in Belo Horizonte, Brazil. His family moved to Harrison, New Jersey when he was thirteen years old.

== Personal life ==
Silva is a Brazilian jiu-jitsu practitioner, having trained with Royce Gracie. He also dances and is fluent in Portuguese, English and Spanish.

Silva is openly gay, and came out when he went to college.

== Filmography ==
| Year | Title | Role | Notes |
|---|---|---|---|
| 2015 | Drunk Art Love | Ed | Miniseries |
| 2017 | Unpaid Interns | Jay "Pennystock" Meirelles | Short film |
| 2018 | Narrator Syndrome | Faceless Man #3 | Short film |
| 2019 | Madam Secretary | Oscar Cortez | Episode: "Something Better" |
| 2019 | Fluidity | Raul | |
| 2020 | The Corps | Darryl Silvanos | Web series |
| 2020–2025 | 9-1-1: Lone Star | Carlos Reyes | Main cast |
| 2025 | The Waterfront | Shawn West | Main cast |

== Awards and nominations ==
| Award | Year | Category | Nominated work | Result | Ref. |
|---|---|---|---|---|---|
| Black Tie Dinner | 2022 | Vanguard Award | Himself | Honored | |
