= Glory Days (2002 TV series) =

- Also known as: Demontown
- Genre: Mystery; Drama
- Created by: Kevin Williamson
- Starring: Eddie Cahill; Poppy Montgomery; Jay R. Ferguson; Emily VanCamp; Ben Crowley; Amy Stewart; Theresa Russell; Frances Fisher
- Opening theme: "Excess" by Tricky
- Composers: Marco Beltrami; Tom Hiel
- Country of origin: United States
- Original language: English
- No. of seasons: 1
- No. of episodes: 9

Production
- Executive producers: Billy Campbell; Bob Weinstein; Harvey Weinstein; Kevin Williamson
- Producer: Gina Fortunato
- Cinematography: John S. Bartley
- Editors: Allan Lee; John Showalter; Erik Whitmyre
- Camera setup: Single-camera
- Running time: 45–48 minutes
- Production companies: Outerbanks Entertainment; Dimension Television

Original release
- Network: The WB
- Release: January 16 – March 25, 2002

Glory Days (also titled Demontown) is an American mystery drama television series which was broadcast on The WB from January 16 to March 25, 2002. The series was created by Kevin Williamson and produced by Outerbanks Entertainment and Dimension Television, and starred Eddie Cahill, Poppy Montgomery, and Jay R. Ferguson.

== Synopsis ==
The series involves novelist Mike Dolan (Cahill) returning to his hometown, where various odd and unpleasant occurrences are happening.

== Cast ==
- Eddie Cahill as Mike Dolan
- Poppy Montgomery as Ellie Sparks
- Jay R. Ferguson as Sheriff Rudy Dunlop
- Emily VanCamp as Sam Dolan
- Ben Crowley as Zane Walker
- Amy Stewart as Sara Dolan
- Theresa Russell as Hazel Walker
- Frances Fisher as Mitzi Dolan

== Episodes ==
No.	Title	Directed by	Written by	Original release date	Prod. code
1	"Grim Ferrytale"	Randy Zisk	Kevin Williamson	January 16, 2002	001
Mike Dolan returns home to Glory Island and witnesses a murder aboard the ferry. A sinister board game may hold the clue to the series of mysterious occurrences in town.
2	"The Devil Made Me Do It"	Perry Lang	Kevin Williamson	January 23, 2002	002
Mike interviews a young piano prodigy who claims to be possessed by a demon. The town holds auditions for a local production of The Wizard of Oz. Mitzi and Hazel squabble over Hazel’s years-ago affair with Mitzi’s husband.
3	"Miss Fortune Teller"	Jean de Segonzac	Adam Armus & Kay Foster	January 30, 2002	003
Mike enlists the help of a local psychic to help find Sam, who is the latest in a string of girls to be kidnapped.
4	"Death, Lies and Videotape"	Randy Zisk	Heather E. Ash	February 6, 2002	004
Ellie is targeted by a serial killer who sends each victim a videotape of the previous murder. Mitzi sets Sara up with a doctor who is visiting the island.
5	"The Lost Girls"	Randy Zisk	Elizabeth Craft & Sarah Fain	February 13, 2002	005
Sam and Zane encounter a group of young women who claim to be vampires. A body totally drained of blood is recovered from the lake. Hazel and Ellie take a painting class, where Ellie catches the eye of the instructor.
6	"Everybody Loves Rudy"	Jean de Segonzac	Adam Armus, Kay Foster, Elizabeth Craft & Sarah Fain	February 20, 2002	006
Rudy is the prime suspect in the murder of a young woman who is literally stabbed through the heart. Sam is jealous when Zane goes on a date with another girl.
7	"There Goes the Neighborhood"	David Petrarca	Andi Bushell & Jim Praytor	March 11, 2002	007
Mike is suspicious of his new neighbors whose son takes an interest in Sam. An eccentric local is murdered with his own metal detector.
8	"No Guts, No Glory"	Perry Lang	Austin Winsberg & Adam F. Goldberg	March 18, 2002	008
A series of murders seem to be linked to a local hero who is uncomfortable with his recent fame. Mike is visited by an ex-girlfriend.
9	"Clowning Glory"	Tony Bill	Andi Bushell & Jim Praytor	March 25, 2002	009
A number of residents of Glory Island are decapitated by a murderous clown. Rudy makes a romantic connection with a friend of Sara who is visiting the island.

== Production ==
Kevin Williamson originally conceived Glory Days as a drama in the same vein as his first series, Dawson's Creek, and a pilot was produced using this format. After picking up the series, The WB asked Williamson to retool the show and turn it into a mystery series instead. The characters and relationships remained the same but a whodunit spin was added.

The series was produced by Dimension Television and Outerbanks Entertainment, and filmed at The Bridge Studios in Vancouver, B.C., Canada.

== Home media ==
The series was released on Region 2/PAL DVDs in Europe.

In most European countries (including the United Kingdom and Ireland) it is released under the DVD title Demontown with seven episodes edited into three feature-length parts: Demontown (episodes 1, 2 & 3), Demontown II (episodes 4 & 5), and Demontown III (episodes 6 & 7). Each part is available as three separate straight-to-DVD ‘movies’.

In the Netherlands, the series is available as a 2-disc DVD set with all three parts included (Demontown and Demontown II on disc one, and Demontown III on disc two).
