= List of 9-1-1: Lone Star episodes =

9-1-1: Lone Star is an American procedural drama television series created by Ryan Murphy, Brad Falchuk and Tim Minear for the Fox Broadcasting Company. The series follows the lives of Austin first responders: police officers, paramedics, firefighters and dispatchers. The series premiered on January 19, 2020. 9-1-1: Lone Star is a joint production between Reamworks, Ryan Murphy Television, and 20th Century Fox Television and syndicated by 20th Television. In May 2023, the series was renewed for a fifth season. In September 2024, it was announced that the fifth season would be its final season.

During the course of the series, 72 episodes of 9-1-1: Lone Star aired over five seasons, between January 19, 2020, and February 3, 2025.

== Series overview ==
Season	Episodes	Originally released		Rank	Viewership (millions)
Season	Episodes	First released	Last released	Rank	Viewership (millions)
1	10	January 19, 2020	March 9, 2020	25	9.09
2	14	January 18, 2021	May 24, 2021	15	8.71
3	18	January 3, 2022	May 16, 2022	20	7.43
4	18	January 24, 2023	May 16, 2023	35	5.73
5	12	September 23, 2024	February 3, 2025	69	7.1

== Episodes ==
=== Season 1 (2020) ===
No. overall	No. in season	Title	Directed by	Written by	Original release date	Prod. code	U.S. viewers (millions)
1	1	"Pilot"	Bradley Buecker	Ryan Murphy & Brad Falchuk & Tim Minear	January 19, 2020	1CJW01	11.41
An Austin, Texas firefighting company is decimated in a fire accident. FDNY Captain Owen Strand, having rebuilt his own team after 9/11, is offered the job, but he declines. Strand learns he has lung cancer, and saves his son TK from a drug overdose. Strand accepts the job and brings TK with him, to lead a new diverse team of firefighters.
2	2	"Yee-Haw"	Bradley Buecker	Tim Minear & Rashad Raisani	January 20, 2020	1CJW02	5.94
The crew deals with a mercury poisoning attack where Paul's "gift of threat assessment" pinpoints the culprit. A nuisance 9-1-1 call is made involving a neighborhood dispute. And later the crew deals with a gas leak in an apartment complex. EMT captain Michelle answers a personal call for help aiding a young boy with an asthma attack; the grateful family reveals a clue about her sister Iris' disappearance three years prior. She later consults a curandera (played by Lourdes Benedicto) for advice. Judd and Captain Strand bond over their therapies for post-traumatic stress disorder (PTSD), and lung cancer respectively. TK has second thoughts about his affair with Carlos, a cop, when Carlos wants more of a relationship.
3	3	"Texas Proud"	Jennifer Lynch	Kristy Lowrey	January 27, 2020	1CJW04	5.58
The team responds to a man suffocating in corn within a grain silo, TK disobeys orders to save Marjan; videos of the rescue show Marjan after her hijab had fallen off which goes viral. Later, at her mosque, she is told to look for another place of worship for being too visible as a firefighter. TK gets into a fight with Judd and instigates a fight at a bar, but in the aftermath makes up with Carlos. At a sirloin eating contest, a woman collapses and the EMS team diagnoses her as having hyponatremia, "water intoxication", causing a distended bladder. The team responds to a woman who fell from her seventh-floor balcony while doing yoga. Michelle, disobeying a restraining order, confronts her sister Iris's old boyfriend Dustin, while Owen gets chemotherapy and advice for dealing with his lung cancer; the two later share a bottle of tequila at the bar. Afterward, a drunken Owen assaults Dustin, but the next day Dustin agrees to help Michelle, the episode ends with a tornado heading toward a woman in her car.
4	4	"Act of God"	Sharat Raju	Molly Green & James Leffler	February 3, 2020	1CJW03	6.39
The team members are put on high alert when an EF4 level tornado (with 166–200 mph winds causing devastating damage) rips through Austin. After attending his next chemotherapy, Owen considers telling TK about his diagnosis. Before he can, TK discovers the truth and confronts Owen. Michelle and her mother also find an important clue regarding Iris' disappearance in an old scrapbook.
5	5	"Studs"	Bradley Buecker	Carly Soteras	February 10, 2020	1CJW05	5.73
The team is called to a brawl at a male strip club; Paul helps Josie, who got hit in the eye with stripper glitter. They date where he reveals his gender identity but she cannot deal with that news, so they part ways. TK and Carlos take him out dancing to get over her. Meanwhile, Owen gets chemotherapy and Wayne gives him advice that impotence is a side effect; later Owen meets Zoe, a professor, and cannot get erect during sex, she advises that most erectile dysfunction can be addressed by relaxing that proves to be true. In another incident, Carlos responds to a women's shelter where a misogynist incel protests; a man hit in the head reveals to the paramedics he has CPPD (calcium pyrophosphate dihydrate crystal deposition disease), a condition characterized as extra painful arthritis. En route to the hospital he goes into cardiac arrest needing defibrillation; the treatment reacts with the man's ingested medication causing a toxic vapor which causes the ambulance crew to pass out, and the vehicle to flip. Meanwhile, Grace confronts Judd about his lack of romance; on a following night he makes it up to her. On another call at a cow breeding facility, a disgruntled customer sets a fire to distract from his theft of bull semen.
6	6	"Friends Like These"	Marita Grabiak	John Owen Lowe	February 17, 2020	1CJW06	6.04
The team responds to a car trapped under a moving truck; the driver requires a field blood transfusion (Note: A field procedure is one done out in the open rather than in a hospital.) as a trauma doctor cannot get there in time. Judd has Owen join a poker game, Texas hold 'em, where he meets Billy, an unknown nemesis because he was the former captain of the 126 on leave with thyroid cancer when the-then team was decimated. They hit it off, and play golf together, but Billy reports Owen's cancer in a bid to get his job. "Probie" Mateo is "severely dyslexic", and is on his last try to pass the Fire Department Academy test; the Americans with Disabilities Act mandates they accommodate him by offering an oral exam. Marjan is tasked with helping him study and the team helps, Mateo passes. On a call, the team encounters a bloody dog who leads them to a man crushed by his swather harvester. On another call Grace helps an older man with a flu who ingested a cloud of cremation remains while disposing of a friend's ashes.
7	7	"Bum Steer"	John J. Gray	Jill Snyder	February 24, 2020	1CJW07	5.65
The team responds to a used car lot event where a bull got caught in the side of a vehicle and needs the hydraulic jaws-of-life. Owen trains for his Candidate Physical Ability Test (CPAT) but it looks doubtful he will succeed. Later, Grace reminds Judd that Owen helped him so he should assist in dealing with Billy and the CPAT. Judd confronts Owen for letting his ego make the CPAT wager. Later Owen and Billy play golf in a storm and Billy is electrocuted by a lightning strike. Owen carries him to safety, saving his life, which the Deputy Chief counts as the CPAT challenge met. Michelle follows up on her younger sister Iris' disappearance with Detective Washington. On another call, a handyman's epileptic seizure is mistaken for electrocution.
8	8	"Monster Inside"	Gwyneth Horder-Payton	Tonya Kong	March 2, 2020	1CJW08	5.61
The team responds to a rattlesnake home infestation requiring them to use a fire extinguisher with CO_{2} to repel the reptiles. Carlos helps Michelle follow up on a lead to Iris' disappearance. In the car wreckage they find a cell phone of hers revealing a history of paranoia-induced 9-1-1 calls showing signs of schizophrenia. Owen gets good news about his cancer while learning that his experimental immunotherapy drug was tested on dogs, some who were abandoned. He adopts Buttercup, a Bernese Mountain Dog who has the same kind of lung cancer, as the 126's new semi-destructive mascot. On a call to help a non-responsive woman, the team realizes she has been dead for days and her adult son needs mental health care. Grace has a call from a man with dementia who broke into his former home scaring the current armed older couple who hide in a bedroom; When the crew arrive, the elderly man has a heart attack and their young grandson shoots TK by mistake when they break into the room to help.
9	9	"Awakening"	David Grossman	Rashad Raisani	March 9, 2020	1CJW09	5.38
At a gender reveal party a man tending the grill is set afire by the cloud of powder; the stress of the ordeal sends the pregnant woman into premature labor. At the hospital TK awakens from his gunshot wounds; in recovering he tries to find meaning in his life. A man spelunking with his son gets trapped upside-down; they ease him out and lift him from the 80-foot cave. Judd's father is having difficulty living on his own so he and Grace try to help; later his father severely cuts himself falling on a glass-topped table. A young boy gets a toy car stuck up his nose but refuses to go to the hospital, Paul intervenes to get the toy out; later, the team returns as his curious father got the same toy stuck up his nose. The episode ends with Grace getting a call from the International Space Station.
10	10	"Austin, We Have a Problem"	Bradley Buecker	Rashad Raisani & Tim Minear	March 9, 2020	1CJW10	5.38
Chaos ensues in Austin when a solar storm causes the electricity and power equipment to malfunction. The 126 team has to rescue the passengers of a light aircraft caught in the lines of high voltage electric towers while transporting a sick man for a liver transplant. During an outing with Carlos, TK questions his relationship with him after Carlos begins asking. When the malfunctioning traffic lights cause several accidents, they rush to help people before the 126 arrives. In the homeless camp, Michelle discovers that her lost sister is alive and living there. Michelle and her mother try to get her back home but she chooses to stay at the camp, despite her schizophrenia. With the lines scrambled, Grace gets a call from the damaged ISS, and manages to connect its last astronaut, dying from radiation poisoning, with his family to say goodbye. Back at the firehouse, TK confesses his addiction to the rest of the team and that he's realized he wants to be a firefighter after all. Later, he also reconciles with Carlos.

=== Season 2 (2021) ===
No. overall	No. in season	Title	Directed by	Written by	Original release date	Prod. code	U.S. viewers (millions)
11	1	"Back in the Saddle"	Bradley Buecker	Tim Minear & Rashad Raisani	January 18, 2021	2CJW01	6.03
Owen and the rest of the first responders deal with a rogue military tank on the loose, creating chaos in Austin. Meanwhile, Owen meets the new paramedic-in-charge, Tommy Vega, following Michelle Blake's departure. TK's patience runs out as his mother (who has been staying with him and Owen throughout the COVID-19 pandemic) and Owen's verbal sparring crescendos. The episode ends with magma heading towards a woman in her food truck.
12	2	"2100°"	Bradley Buecker	Molly Green & James Leffler	January 25, 2021	2CJW02	5.90
The team's cancer remission celebration for Owen is cut short after a volcanic sinkhole opens up at a family outing, leading a series of them to open up around Austin. The team responds to a college pool party. A paramedic is killed during the incident. Grace helps a woman trapped in her food truck by a horde of scorpions. Tommy begins to question her leadership skills, and the episode ends with a massive wildfire turning into an episode we will never forget.
13	3	"Hold the Line"	Bradley Buecker	Jessica Ball & John Owen Lowe	February 1, 2021	2CJW03	6.14
Los Angeles firefighters Evan "Buck" Buckley, Eddie Diaz, and Henrietta Wilson travel to Texas and meet Owen, TK, and the rest of the first responders and assist in putting out the wildfire that is spreading out of control. Owen and Hen inadvertently get trapped in a mine while trying to save a kid. TK and Buck bond and discuss their home-related problems. Eddie and Buck discover that Marjan is a former social media star. This episode picks up after the 9-1-1 episode "Future Tense".
14	4	"Friends with Benefits"	Sanaa Hamri	Carly Soteras & Jalysa Conway	February 8, 2021	2CJW04	5.59
As the 126 deals with a disastrous wedding reception and a man trapped in a difficult position, their relationships become slightly, more complicated than they thought. Marjan's fiancé comes to visit her in Austin and delivers some surprising news which forces her to confront her feelings. TK is worried about how committed Carlos is to their relationship after he failed to introduce him to his parents. Meanwhile, Gwyneth asks Owen for some clarity on their relationship. Although hesitant to label their relationship, Owen realizes that he still loves Gwyneth and asks her to marry him again, but she gives him some life-changing news–she's pregnant.
15	5	"Difficult Conversations"	Sanaa Hamri	Wolfe Coleman	February 15, 2021	2CJW05	5.73
While at a call of a possible heart attack victim, Judd discovers that the victim is his father-in-law and figures out that he is having an affair. He struggles to figure out how to tell Grace. Owen and Gwyneth struggle to decide whether to go through with her high-risk pregnancy after discussing the complications with her OB/GYN. Meanwhile, Grace and Carlos deal with a 9-1-1 call involving a woman in an active domestic abuse situation. Later, the team responds to a car accident involving a man and his daughter. Unfortunately, the man dies on the scene. TK, Marjan, and Paul struggle to tell Mateo about his faulty tattoo.
16	6	"Everyone and Their Brother"	Marcus Stokes	Molly Green & James Leffler	February 22, 2021	2CJW06	5.36
TK and Owen jeopardize their lives when saving two brothers trapped in a mine field. Grace receives a 911 call involving conjoined twins, with one of them choking. Meanwhile, TK deals with the fallout of learning that he will be a big brother. Paul's mother and sister visit him, and Paul learns something new about his sister. Tommy interviews candidates to fill the vacant paramedic position.
17	7	"Displaced"	Paula Hunziker	Jessica Ball	March 1, 2021	2CJW07	5.34
The team at the 126 deals with calls involving a dead body falling from an airplane onto an active funeral and a hospital staff member accidentally stuck to an MRI scanner. Meanwhile, Owen and Gwyneth begin to revert to their old ways when it comes to boundaries when Gwyneth moves in with Owen. Tommy feels left out when her husband takes full charge of their children. TK begins his first day as a paramedic and begins to rub Nancy the wrong way.
18	8	"Bad Call"	Bradley Buecker	Tonya Kong	March 8, 2021	2CJW08	5.35
Carlos' career as a police officer is put in jeopardy when he makes a split second decision when apprehending a suspect who had robbed a bank with a bomb strapped to his chest while at the same time his father, who is a Texas Ranger, is working a similar case involving a serial bomber and gets involved with the investigation. Later on, TK, Tommy, and Nancy get kidnapped by the same suspect while responding to a false pregnancy call, and it's up to Owen and Carlos to track them down. Meanwhile, TK celebrates one year of sobriety, but his happiness is cut short when he discovers that Gwyneth and Owen had broken up again and learns that the baby is not Owen's. The episode ends with Grace and Judd getting run off the road into a lake, their lives hanging in the balance.
19	9	"Saving Grace"	Sharat Raju	Tonya Kong & Wolfe Coleman	April 19, 2021	2CJW09	5.49
In 1995, a teenage Judd and his friend take a neighbor's car and get into a head-on collision that kills his friend. In 2012, 126 responds to a call involving an elderly woman falling on the floor. When they go to help her, the woman refuses and tells him to get out of her house. Judd soon realizes that the woman is his late friend's mother. Later on, Judd contemplates suicide but calls the prayer hotline and meets Grace. They develop a friendship and a budding romance through their numerous phone conversations. Grace also encourages Judd to make amends to his friend's mother. In the present day, Grace and Judd get involved in a hit and run where their truck is forced off the bridge and into a lake, causing them to almost drown. Soon after, Judd and Grace are rescued by 126 and learn that Grace will experience memory loss and require physical therapy to walk again. The doctors also reveal to Judd that Grace is pregnant.
20	10	"A Little Help From My Friends"	Marita Grabiak	Jalysa Conway	April 26, 2021	2CJW10	4.92
After TK moves in with Carlos, Owen asks Mateo to move in since Mateo's roommates set his house on fire. Mateo soon discovers that Owen is severely depressed and is trying to hide it, and the team holds an intervention for Owen. Meanwhile, a pregnant Grace struggles to live an independent life following her near-fatal accident. Also, the team responds to a call of a girl with her hand stuck in an ice cream machine, and a boy gets stuck on the roof of a house.
21	11	"Slow Burn"	Chad Lowe	John Owen Lowe	May 3, 2021	2CJW11	5.26
While in recovery from removing the last bit of cancer tumors, Owen inadvertently gets himself into tracking down a serial arsonist. Meanwhile, Marjan receives backlash as a social media influencer when someone dies during a rescue and the survivor pins all blame on her for "posing for the camera". Also, TK finally meets and has dinner with Carlos' parents.
22	12	"The Big Heat"	Ben Hernandez Bray	Carly Soteras	May 10, 2021	2CJW12	4.91
Owen is taken into custody and charged with arson when he is seen at the scene of the fire. Owen pleads to the detectives to look into Billy Tyson because he thinks he is being framed. TK and Carlos have a falling out when TK learns that his father was arrested by Carlos's father and doesn't want to help to get him out of jail. Owen soon reveals that he is working with Billy and Carlos's father in order to finally track down the actual serial arsonist. Meanwhile, Carlos and TK are trapped when Carlos's house goes up in flames. The episode ends with Tommy arriving home to find her husband dead.
23	13	"One Day"	Sanaa Hamri	Tim Minear & Rashad Raisani	May 17, 2021	2CJW13	5.20
Tommy is in a state of shock when her husband dies suddenly from a brain aneurysm. She tries not to think about what happened and decides whether or not to tell Owen, Judd, or Grace. While waiting for the results of his autopsy, Tommy meets a man who takes the hospital hostage to save his child who is in a vegetative state, the episode ends with a massive duststorm heading toward the city of Austin.
24	14	"Dust to Dust"	Bradley Buecker	Tim Minear & Rashad Raisani	May 24, 2021	2CJW14	5.21
Chaos ensues in Austin when a powerful dust storm engulfs the city leaving nothing but destruction. Mateo goes out of his way to help the victims of the storm while on a food run. Meanwhile, with Firehouse 126 still out of commission, the members are forced to work at other houses until 126 opens back up. Owen considers a decision whether or not to take a job as Austin's next fire commissioner. Also, Tommy contemplates the decision whether to quit and stay at home full time following her husband's death. Grace returns to the call center following her near fatal car accident.

=== Season 3 (2022) ===
No. overall	No. in season	Title	Directed by	Written by	Original release date	Prod. code	U.S. viewers (millions)
25	1	"The Big Chill"	Bradley Buecker	Tim Minear & Rashad Raisani	January 3, 2022	3CJW01	5.50
Austin is hit with a big ice storm. Owen struggles with the ramifications of the 126 closure, as T.K., Tommy, and Nancy settle into their new job in the private sector. Judd and Grace are getting ready to welcome their first child.
26	2	"Thin Ice"	Bradley Buecker	Trey Callaway & Carly Soteras	January 10, 2022	3CJW02	5.03
The ice storm is still going on. T.K., Tommy, and Nancy rush to save a small boy trapped under the ice of a frozen-over pond. Judd and Mateo try to rescue Paul, trapped under rubble.
27	3	"Shock & Thaw"	Bradley Buecker	Tim Minear & Rashad Raisani & Trey Callaway & Carly Soteras	January 24, 2022	3CJW03	5.39
The ice storm continues to rage on while T.K.'s life hangs in the balance, and Grace prepares to give birth to Judd and her child. Owen tries to save migrants pursued by a cartel.
28	4	"Push"	Marita Grabiak	Tim Minear & Rashad Raisani	January 31, 2022	3CJW08	6.01
Grace becomes stuck in the ice storm while giving birth; Owen, Judd, and Tommy scramble to find her. T.K. is still in a coma, and the prognosis is not good. In one of the dream sequences, he finally reveals why he and Carlos broke up. Owen vows that he'll "make things right" by signing the apology letter; he and Tommy go to find Billy. They find him stranded with Grace; Judd makes it in time to see his daughter born. T.K. wakes up, and he and Carlos reconcile. Judd and Grace name their daughter Charlie in honor of Tommy's late husband. The 126's crowdfunding campaign succeeds and the firehouse officially reopens.
29	5	"Child Care"	Brenna Malloy	Jessica Ball & Jalysa Conway	February 7, 2022	3CJW04	5.18
Owen's having a hard time so he decides to get on a dating app. Meanwhile, the 126 arrives at a house fire and discover that the couple's daughter has gone missing. Judd encounters a teen who says he's his son. The team determines the missing girl was abducted – by someone who hacked her parents' "nanny cam" system and befriended the girl through it.
30	6	"The ATX-Files"	Yangzom Brauen	Molly Green & James Leffler	February 14, 2022	3CJW05	4.95
The 126 responds to a man who got trapped in barbed wire while fleeing from "blue aliens". Judd tries to get to know his son, Wyatt, but finds out they have nothing in common. In order to bond with him, Judd asks Owen to take him and Wyatt alien hunting, but things don't go as planned when they stumble upon a suspicious animal carcass. Meanwhile, the 126 paramedics respond to a call at a psychic reading, where a woman has tapeworms coming out of her nose and mouth.
31	7	"Red vs Blue"	Chad Lowe	John Owen Lowe & Jamie Kessler	February 21, 2022	3CJW06	5.13
Owen decides to settle things on the softball field after an altercation between him and an aggressive police sergeant goes viral. A night shift 911 dispatcher rubs Grace the wrong way when he moves to the day shift – until he earns her respect by talking a suicidal father out of killing himself. The softball game leads to a brawl between the firefighter and police teams. Later, the 126 has to rescue the sergeant from a raging building fire. In the final scene, T.K. receives some devastating news.
32	8	"In the Unlikely Event of an Emergency"	John J. Gray	Matt Solik	February 28, 2022	3CJW07	4.82
When T.K. and Owen get on a plane to go to New York for T.K.'s mother(Gwyneth)'s funeral, things go awry when the plane's engine catches fire. Flashbacks dated 2017 show T.K.'s mother convincing him to leave a drug den where he was getting high, and then accompanying him on a flight to rehab in California.
33	9	"The Bird"	Scott White	Wolfe Coleman	March 7, 2022	3CJW09	5.16
The 126 responds to a call where a woman accidentally crashes her car into her own husband. Owen is not pleased when he finds out that Gwen left him her pet macaw in her will. Paul gets some distressing news that may end his career as a firefighter. Meanwhile, Tommy invites T.K. to join her at a bereavement support group.
34	10	"Parental Guidance"	Ben Hernandez Bray	Carly Soteras	March 14, 2022	3CJW10	4.64
The 126 responds to a call involving the same woman who ran over her husband in the previous episode; this time, she's run over a man dressed as a knight who has carbon monoxide poisoning. Treating the knight leads the 126 to a whole group of people with the same poisoning. Meanwhile, Paul is recuperating at home after his heart surgery. When he admits he feels afraid to come back to work, Owen, Judd and Tommy help him get back in shape and pass the department's fitness test. He and Marjan eventually reconcile. At the same time, Mateo helps his old 129 boss, Captain Tatum, when Tatum reaches out to him after the death of his lieutenant.
35	11	"Prince Albert in a Can"	Bradley Buecker	Jessica Ball	March 21, 2022	3CJW11	4.45
When Catherine receives flowers at work and opens the envelope that came with them, she gets exposed to a suspicious white powder – a possible biological weapon. The 126, in full HAZMAT gear, rushes to her aid. Meanwhile, after a prank 9-1-1 call turns deadly and leads to Grace and Carlos being put on leave, they team up to try to identify whoever's responsible.
36	12	"Negative Space"	John J. Gray	Bob Goodman	March 28, 2022	3CJW12	3.85
Owen and Marjan are shocked to find out that Deputy Roy Griffin, the corrupt officer who almost killed Owen during the snowstorm, was released from prison. Sadie, Owen's neighbor and fellow hostage during the snowstorm, is now in town and invites him and Marjan to her art show – but when Griffin shows up, an altercation ensues. Later, the 126 responds to a fire at Sadie's art gallery. Fearing that the deputy is behind it, Owen and Marjan stake out his home while Sadie is left in the care of T.K. and Carlos. Meanwhile, when Nancy saves the life of a patient wearing a "Do Not Resuscitate" bracelet, she and Tommy face repercussions.
37	13	"Riddle of the Sphynx"	Tessa Blake	Jalysa Conway	April 11, 2022	3CJW13	4.24
The members of the 126 are in a race to find and save a car crash victim after he is thrown from his bicycle and disappears in a field of hay. Owen decides to babysit Catherine's pet sphynx but things go awry after he meets her 'ex'. Carlos becomes jealous when T.K. starts spending a lot of time with his sponsor. At the same time, Tommy goes on a date with a member from her grief support group.
38	14	"Impulse Control"	Bradley Buecker	Trey Callaway	April 18, 2022	3CJW14	4.21
The 126 respond to a call containing the same man, in three different emergencies, all of which he's a cause of. Meanwhile, Marjan urges Owen to continue his anger management therapy even after his court-mandated time is up. Tommy faces her own challenges when her estranged brother-in-law comes to visit.
39	15	"Down To Clown"	S. J. Main Muñoz	Molly Green & James Leffler	April 25, 2022	3CJW15	4.56
Grace invites a fellow 9-1-1 call operator, Dave, to dinner after he ends up losing someone on a call, but she ends up with more than she bargained for after Judd invites him to stay for a week after he finds out he has plumbing issues at his own apartment. Owen finds out he may have a deep fear of clowns after he freezes up on a call. Meanwhile, T.K brings home a lizard after a call involving the reptile, which Carlos is not happy about.
40	16	"Shift-Less"	Christine Khalafian	Wolfe Coleman	May 2, 2022	3CJW16	4.27
Owen goes to L.A to visit the father he hasn't seen since he was 13. Owen's past as a child is also shown, including the deadly accident that killed his younger brother and broke the family apart. Judd, meanwhile, gets a call from the county jail regarding his son, Wyatt, which leads to an unforeseen bonding between son, father, and grandfather. Owen's father tells him to stop blaming himself for his brother's death.
41	17	"Spring Cleaning"	Chad Lowe	Jamie Kessler	May 9, 2022	3CJW17	4.80
When a guy falls into a trash compactor and a desperate mother tries to save her children from a speeding car, the 126 responds. Judd encourages his son to dress for the internship he wants, which backfires spectacularly. When Nancy wants to tell the group about her and Mateo's relationship, Mateo has some reservations about it. Meanwhile, Tommy and Julius become increasingly closer.
42	18	"A Bright and Cloudless Morning"	Tim Minear & Bradley Buecker	Bob Goodman	May 16, 2022	3CJW18	4.63
When Judd becomes trapped under a collapsed building, the 126 respond to his rescue. Owen gets potential bad news from his oncologist, which makes his 9/11 memories rise to the surface. Meanwhile, TK and Carlos get engaged.

=== Season 4 (2023) ===
No. overall	No. in season	Title	Directed by	Written by	Original release date	Prod. code	U.S. viewers (millions)
43	1	"The New Hotness"	Bradley Buecker	Molly Green & James Leffler	January 24, 2023	4CJW01	3.92
Captains Strand and Vega, along with the members of the 126, are called into action to a county fair when a series of fast-moving group of severe thunderstorms hit Austin, causing a wide path of destruction. Owen's newfound passion for motorcycling puts him on a potentially dangerous path. Tommy has the potential for a romance when she meets an attractive single father. As TK and Carlos prepare for their wedding, a secret from Carlos' past may stand in their way to happiness.
44	2	"The New Hot Mess"	Chad Lowe	Bob Goodman	January 31, 2023	4CJW02	4.05
Captain Strand and the 126 race to the rescue when a woman is trapped in her mobile house hijacked by her ex; Owen has a run-in with former nemesis Sgt. O'Brien and questioned by the FBI; Tommy asks Grace for dating advice; T.K. and Carlos meet with Iris Blake.
45	3	"Cry Wolf"	David Katzenberg	Carly Soteras & Wolfe Coleman	February 7, 2023	4CJW03	3.80
As Owen gets pulled deeper into the FBI's investigation of the motorcycle gang, Sgt. O'Brien confesses to him. Meanwhile, Grace and the 126 respond to a call from a man who claims his girlfriend slipped over the side of a cliff, and Carlos searches for a missing friend, putting his own life in danger.
46	4	"Abandoned"	Christine Khalafian	Jalysa Conway & Jamie Kessler	February 14, 2023	4CJW04	3.65
As Owen wears an FBI wire for his meeting with O'Brien, The Honor Dogs crash the meet-up and let them know there's an infiltrator in their midst. A frantic TK desperately searches for a missing and held captive Carlos.
47	5	"Human Resources"	Félix Enríquez Alcalá	Molly Green & James Leffler	February 21, 2023	4CJW05	3.54
Owen defends Marjan when a rescue complaint---from the formerly estranged couple whose mobile home was hijacked by the husband ("The New Hot Mess")---forces her to make a challenging ethical decision. Meanwhile, Grace befriends a young boy who becomes a frequent 9-1-1 caller, but she must step in when she discovers he may be in some real danger.
48	6	"This Is Not a Drill"	Michael Medico	Kelly Souders & Brian Peterson	February 28, 2023	4CJW06	3.39
Capt. Strand reveals to the 126 that he has been working with the FBI to help bring down a domestic terrorist group with his Austin motorcycle club/gang, The Honor Dogs, then races to respond to a bomb threat at the State Capitol and put a stop to the terrorist deadly plans.
49	7	"Tommy Dearest"	Scott White	Bob Goodman & Jamie Kessler	March 7, 2023	4CJW07	4.08
Capt. Strand and the 126 help a husband whose wife "dies" when she is not upside down. Grace takes a call from a pizza delivery driver who is in for the shock of his life. Tommy is worried Trevor's young daughter is a bad seed as she attempts to break them up. Paul is hesitant to go on a date with Asha, who knew him before his transition.
50	8	"Control Freaks"	Tori Garrett	Jalysa Conway	March 14, 2023	4CJW09	3.72
The 126 must rescue a father/son involved in a driver's ed lesson gone haywire, then encounter a self-help guru who has lost self-control. Meanwhile, Owen turns into a "Dadzilla" in helping plan TK and Carlos' wedding, and Marjan is suspicious when she meets and aids a stranded couple on her road trip.
51	9	"Road Kill"	Brenna Malloy	Carly Soteras & Wolfe Coleman	March 21, 2023	4CJW08	3.60
Marjan's helping an abused young woman escape on a bus to Fort Lauderdale has deadly consequences: the man is freed of assault charges on bail the same day and pursues Marjan, running her off the road and injuring her gravely. But Marjan receives aid from an unlikely source.
52	10	"Sellouts"	Tessa Blake	Molly Green & James Leffler	March 28, 2023	4CJW10	3.90
Tommy goes paramedic crew-to-crew against her former employer, private contractors Paragons Medics, as they deal with emergencies involving a dialysis patient and at a perfume factory. Meanwhile, Owen hits it off with a beautiful woman he meets at a fundraiser.
53	11	"Double Trouble"	Bradley Buecker	Jamie Kessler	April 4, 2023	4CJW11	3.37
The 126 race to rescue a woman with an arrow shot into her neck. Judd is doubly surprised by Wyatt's news; Mateo helps a needy family member and comes to regret it.
54	12	"Swipe Left"	Steve Danton	Carly Soteras	April 11, 2023	4CJW14	3.48
When she discovers her former fiancé is having a baby with his new wife, the 126 help Marjan enter the dating world through chaperoned dates. Owen and the team are called to the rescue when a pregnant woman takes matters (and her anger) out at a motel where she suspects her husband is cheating on her.
55	13	"Open"	John J. Gray	Wolfe Coleman	April 18, 2023	4CJW12	3.36
Owen is shocked by a secret Kendra has kept from him; Grace confronts her father about his past infidelity.
56	14	"Tongues Out"	Keith Tripler	Bob Goodman	April 25, 2023	4CJW13	3.35
Owen enlists Paul's help in proving Kendra's innocence; Tommy deals with church gossip over her relationship with Pastor Trevor.
57	15	"Donors"	Brenna Malloy	Kelly Souders & Brian Peterson	May 2, 2023	4CJW15	3.69
Grace and Carlos work together when they suspect a young woman was a victim of a black market organ trafficking ring; Owen's brother Robert comes to visit and meet TK but surprises Owen with news that can affect the Strand family.
58	16	"A House Divided"	Tessa Blake	Matt Solik	May 9, 2023	4CJW16	3.37
When Tommy and Judd disagree on protocol during a rescue at a paper mill, a full-on feud develops between the 126 EMS and Fire. Owen awaits news that could change his and TK's lives forever.
59	17	"Best of Men"	Chad Lowe	Tim Minear & Rashad Raisani	May 16, 2023	4CJW17	3.32
Owen is conflicted when his brother Robert asks for help; Judd and Grace face a family crisis that lead Judd to make the biggest change ever to his 'new old family'.
60	18	"In Sickness and In Health"	Bradley Buecker	Tim Minear & Rashad Raisani	May 16, 2023	4CJW18	3.32
As TK and Carlos prepare for their wedding day, tragedy strikes. Carlos plans to postpone the wedding to an indefinite date. While helping his mom search for his dad's original insurance policy, Carlos discovers there could be a secret behind his dad's death, which may involve more than the Texas Rangers and Austin Police. Carlos is determined to find out what caused his dad to be shot in the chest.

=== Season 5 (2024–25) ===
No. overall	No. in season	Title	Directed by	Written by	Original release date	Prod. code	U.S. viewers (millions)
61	1	"Both Sides, Now"	Christine Khalafian	Rashad Raisani & Jamie Kessler	September 23, 2024	5CJW01	3.04
One year after Carlos and TK's wedding and Robert's death, the 126 works with Carlos (in his new job as a Texas Ranger) to stop a series of armor car thefts. Meanwhile, Judd settles in to his new life as a retired firefighter just as Grace decides to take a job with her church overseas. It is revealed that Judd's son, Wyatt, has taken a new job as a 9-1-1 dispatcher. With Judd's lieutenant position vacant, Marjan and Paul throw their hats into the ring to take the spot, forcing Owen to make a difficult decision. Also, Owen copes with the loss of his brother, Robert. The episode ends with the 126 receiving a call of a major train derailment.
62	2	"Trainwrecks"	Bradley Buecker	Molly Green & James Leffler	September 30, 2024	5CJW02	2.81
The 126 race against the clock when receiving a call of a disastrous train derailment. Meanwhile, Owen is forced to make a decision about the lieutenant position as the deadline nears. Vega is put into an uncomfortable position as she proposes marriage to Trevor but with stipulations from his ex-wife. Judd contemplates returning to the 126. The episode ends with an explosion from the trainwreck.
63	3	"Cl2"	Bradley Buecker	Carly Soteras & Wolfe Coleman	October 7, 2024	5CJW03	2.93
The 126 continue to fight the toxic gas from a major train derailment. Tommy and her team are put into a corner when rescuing a patient affected by the gas. Meanwhile, Owen makes his decision about the open lieutenant position. Also, Tommy asks Carlos to watch her kids; to his surprise Tommy's fiancé, Trevor, is already at her home.
64	4	"My Way"	Chad Lowe	Todd Harthan & Molly Savard	October 14, 2024	5CJW04	2.40
The 126 respond to a call of a hoarder whose house is infested with rats. Meanwhile, Paul starts to stress at his new position as lieutenant by taking on additional roles in the firehouse. Also, Tommy begins to suspect Trevor's ex-wife, Cassandra, of sabotaging their engagement. The episode ends with Tommy and Trevor breaking off their engagement after it is revealed that Trevor's daughter wants to move back to Kansas to be with her mom but was reluctant to tell her father.
65	5	"Thunderstruck"	Keith Tripler	Christina M. Walker & Matt Solik	October 21, 2024	5CJW05	2.80
Carlos and the Texas Rangers look into a case when several bus passengers suddenly get seizures; they'd ingested drug-filled condoms and were smuggling them over the border. Meanwhile, Owen looks for a new home for an ornery horse whose owner died while riding him. Also, as their first anniversary approaches, TK and Carlos attend couples counseling to work on some issues, including Carlos's obsession with finding his father's killer.
66	6	"Naked Truth"	Yangzom Brauen	James Leffler & Jamie Kessler	November 4, 2024	5CJW06	2.71
The 126 respond to a call with a man trapped under a vending machine. Meanwhile, after accidentally sending a nude photo to everyone at the firehouse, Tommy asks Nancy to get a mammogram after discovering a lump on her breast. Later on, Nancy reveals that her lump is benign and Tommy reveals (who had received a mammogram with Nancy at the same time) that she has a mass on her breast that is cancerous. Also, Owen's grief about his brother comes to a head as he starts hallucinating and sleepwalking.
67	7	"Kiddos"	Brenna Malloy	Molly Green & Molly Savard	November 11, 2024	5CJW07	2.76
TK receives a surprise from his stepdad, Enzo, for his 30th birthday, much to Owen's resentment. Later on, Owen is convinced that Enzo is trying to put a wedge in their relationship. Meanwhile, Nancy continues to look out for Tommy as she begins her treatment for breast cancer. Wyatt tries to talk down a suicidal caller. Also, the 126 respond to a call of a man impaled on a tree.
68	8	"The Quiet Ones"	Scott White	Britt Wilkinson	November 18, 2024	5CJW08	2.80
A murder of a witness to a gang breaks a new lead in the case of Carlos's father's murder. Meanwhile, after hearing that Tommy's chemo is not covered by her insurance, Owen rounds up the 126 to look into the Austin town budget to look for someone expendable. Also, TK considers adopting his baby half brother after his stepfather is arrested for fraud.
69	9	"Fall From Grace"	Dawn Wilkinson	Christina M. Walker & Matt Solik	December 2, 2024	5CJW09	2.65
Carlos and Chief Bridges investigate Ranger Campbell, who goes on the run after being confronted. Owen receives a job opportunity to become the fire chief of New York City, which he weighs while drinking with Judd during a night out. Tommy begins her chemotherapy.
70	10	"All Who Wander"	Bradley Buecker	Carly Soteras & Wolfe Coleman	January 20, 2025	5CJW10	2.42
Judd fights inner demons with his alcohol addiction, literally walks straight into the line of fire when an armory catches on fire; Marjan introduces her boyfriend to her parents.
71	11	"Impact"	John J. Gray	Charlotte L. Balogh & Annie Fawke	January 27, 2025	5CJW11	3.12
Owen reaches a decision about his new job opportunity. Mateo lands himself in hot water following an altercation. TK and Carlos find themselves further back than they were after learning some difficult news. All the while, a huge devastating asteroid is barreling towards the 126 and the capital of texas.
72	12	"Homecoming"	Bradley Buecker	Rashad Raisani	February 3, 2025	5CJW12	3.34
The 126 deals with the aftermath of the asteroid that has the entire city of Austin hanging in the balance. The 126 race against time to stop a nuclear power plant disaster. They are all faced with difficult decisions that could have lasting impact on the team forever.

== Ratings ==
=== Season 1 ===
Viewership and ratings per episode of List of 9-1-1: Lone Star episodes
No.	Title	Air date	Rating (18–49)	Viewers (millions)	DVR (18–49)	DVR viewers (millions)	Total (18–49)	Total viewers (millions)
1	"Pilot"	January 19, 2020	3.1	11.41	0.7	3.13	3.8	14.56
2	"Yee-Haw"	January 20, 2020	1.0	5.94	0.6	2.57	1.6	8.51
3	"Texas Proud"	January 27, 2020	1.0	5.58	0.6	2.85	1.6	8.43
4	"Act of God"	February 3, 2020	1.3	6.39	0.7	2.84	2.0	9.23
5	"Studs"	February 10, 2020	1.0	5.73	0.6	2.76	1.6	8.49
6	"Friends Like These"	February 17, 2020	1.0	6.04	0.4	2.33	1.4	8.38
7	"Bum Steer"	February 24, 2020	0.9	5.65	0.6	2.78	1.5	8.43
8	"Monster Inside"	March 2, 2020	0.9	5.61	0.7	2.92	1.6	8.53
9	"Awakening"	March 9, 2020	0.9	5.38	0.6	2.97	1.5	8.35
10	"Austin, We Have a Problem"	March 9, 2020	0.9	5.38	0.6	2.97	1.5	8.35

=== Season 2 ===
Viewership and ratings per episode of List of 9-1-1: Lone Star episodes
No.	Title	Air date	Rating (18–49)	Viewers (millions)	DVR (18–49)	DVR viewers (millions)	Total (18–49)	Total viewers (millions)
1	"Back in the Saddle"	January 18, 2021	0.9	6.03	—N/a	—N/a	—N/a	—N/a
2	"2100°"	January 25, 2021	1.0	5.90	—N/a	—N/a	—N/a	—N/a
3	"Hold the Line"	February 1, 2021	0.8	6.14	—N/a	—N/a	—N/a	—N/a
4	"Friends with Benefits"	February 8, 2021	0.9	5.59	0.6	3.31	1.6	8.90
5	"Difficult Conversations"	February 15, 2021	0.9	5.73	0.6	3.05	1.4	8.78
6	"Everyone and Their Brother"	February 22, 2021	0.8	5.36	0.8	3.87	1.6	9.23
7	"Displaced"	March 1, 2021	0.9	5.34	0.7	3.48	1.6	8.83
8	"Bad Call"	March 8, 2021	0.9	5.35	0.6	3.16	1.5	8.51
9	"Saving Grace"	April 19, 2021	0.9	5.49	0.7	3.36	1.6	8.85
10	"A Little Help From My Friends"	April 26, 2021	0.7	4.92	0.7	3.24	1.4	8.16
11	"Slow Burn"	May 3, 2021	0.8	5.26	0.6	2.97	1.3	8.09
12	"The Big Heat"	May 10, 2021	0.8	4.91	0.6	2.88	1.3	7.78
13	"One Day"	May 17, 2021	0.8	5.20	0.6	2.85	1.4	8.05
14	"Dust to Dust"	May 24, 2021	0.9	5.21	0.6	3.05	1.5	8.26

=== Season 3 ===
Viewership and ratings per episode of List of 9-1-1: Lone Star episodes
No.	Title	Air date	Rating (18–49)	Viewers (millions)	DVR (18–49)	DVR viewers (millions)	Total (18–49)	Total viewers (millions)
1	"The Big Chill"	January 3, 2022	0.8	5.50	0.4	2.58	1.2	8.09
2	"Thin Ice"	January 10, 2022	0.7	5.03	0.4	2.54	1.1	7.57
3	"Shock & Thaw"	January 24, 2022	0.7	5.39	0.4	2.38	1.1	7.77
4	"Push"	January 31, 2022	0.8	6.01	0.4	2.19	1.2	8.20
5	"Child Care"	February 7, 2022	0.7	5.18	0.4	2.50	1.1	7.68
6	"The ATX-Files"	February 14, 2022	0.6	4.95	0.4	2.56	1.0	7.51
7	"Red vs Blue"	February 21, 2022	0.6	5.13	0.4	2.43	1.0	7.56
8	"In the Unlikely Event of an Emergency"	February 28, 2022	0.6	4.82	0.4	2.59	1.0	7.42
9	"The Bird"	March 7, 2022	0.7	5.16	0.4	2.35	1.1	7.52
10	"Parental Guidance"	March 14, 2022	0.6	4.64	0.4	2.60	0.9	7.24
11	"Prince Albert in a Can"	March 21, 2022	0.6	4.45	0.5	3.08	1.1	7.53
12	"Negative Space"	March 28, 2022	0.5	3.85	0.5	3.02	1.0	6.89
13	"Riddle of the Sphynx"	April 11, 2022	0.5	4.24	0.4	2.74	0.9	6.98
14	"Impulse Control"	April 19, 2022	0.6	4.21	0.5	3.01	1.1	7.22
15	"Down To Clown"	April 25, 2022	0.6	4.56	0.4	2.68	1.0	7.25
16	"Shift-Less"	May 2, 2022	0.5	4.27	0.4	2.63	0.9	6.89
17	"Spring Cleaning"	May 9, 2022	0.6	4.80	0.4	2.43	1.0	7.23
18	"A Bright and Cloudless Morning"	May 16, 2022	0.6	4.63	0.4	2.52	1.0	7.15

=== Season 4 ===
Viewership and ratings per episode of List of 9-1-1: Lone Star episodes
No.	Title	Air date	Rating (18–49)	Viewers (millions)	DVR (18–49)	DVR viewers (millions)	Total (18–49)	Total viewers (millions)
1	"The New Hotness"	January 24, 2023	0.6	3.92	0.3	2.18	0.9	6.11
2	"The New Hot Mess"	January 31, 2023	0.5	4.05	0.3	2.27	0.8	6.32
3	"Cry Wolf"	February 7, 2023	0.5	3.80	0.2	2.21	0.7	6.01
4	"Abandoned"	February 14, 2023	0.5	3.65	0.3	2.25	0.8	5.90
5	"Human Resources"	February 21, 2023	0.5	3.54	0.3	2.19	0.8	5.73
6	"This Is Not a Drill"	February 28, 2023	0.5	3.39	0.3	2.09	0.8	5.48
7	"Tommy Dearest"	March 7, 2023	0.4	4.08	0.4	2.07	0.8	6.15
8	"Control Freaks"	March 14, 2023	0.5	3.72	0.2	2.00	0.7	5.72
9	"Road Kill"	March 21, 2023	0.4	3.60	0.3	1.94	0.7	5.54
10	"Sellouts"	March 28, 2023	0.5	3.90	0.2	1.96	0.7	5.86
11	"Double Trouble"	April 4, 2023	0.4	3.37	0.3	2.00	0.7	5.36
12	"Swipe Left"	April 11, 2023	0.4	3.48	0.3	2.19	0.7	5.67
13	"Open"	April 18, 2023	0.4	3.36	0.3	2.12	0.7	5.48
14	"Tongues Out"	April 25, 2023	0.4	3.35	0.3	2.10	0.7	5.45
15	"Donors"	May 2, 2023	0.4	3.69	0.3	1.89	0.7	5.58
16	"A House Divided"	May 9, 2023	0.4	3.37	0.3	1.94	0.7	5.31
17	"Best of Men"	May 16, 2023	0.4	3.32	0.3	1.94	0.7	5.25
18	"In Sickness and In Health"	May 16, 2023	0.4	3.32	0.3	1.94	0.7	5.25

=== Season 5 ===
Viewership and ratings per episode of List of 9-1-1: Lone Star episodes
No.	Title	Air date	Rating (18–49)	Viewers (millions)	DVR (18–49)	DVR viewers (millions)	Total (18–49)	Total viewers (millions)
1	"Both Sides, Now"	September 23, 2024	0.3	3.04	—N/a	—N/a	—N/a	—N/a
2	"Trainwrecks"	September 30, 2024	0.2	2.81	—N/a	—N/a	—N/a	—N/a
3	"Cl2"	October 7, 2024	0.3	2.93	—N/a	—N/a	—N/a	—N/a
4	"My Way"	October 14, 2024	0.3	2.40	0.1	1.59	0.4	3.98
5	"Thunderstruck"	October 21, 2024	0.3	2.80	0.2	1.45	0.4	4.25
6	"Naked Truth"	November 4, 2024	0.2	2.71	0.2	1.57	0.4	4.28
7	"Kiddos"	November 11, 2024	0.3	2.76	0.1	1.30	0.4	4.06
8	"The Quiet Ones"	November 18, 2024	0.2	2.80	0.2	1.39	0.4	4.18
9	"Fall From Grace"	December 2, 2024	0.2	2.65	0.2	1.46	0.4	4.10
10	"All Who Wander"	January 20, 2025	0.2	2.42	0.2	1.74	0.4	4.15
11	"Impact"	January 27, 2025	0.3	3.12	0.2	1.34	0.5	4.48
12	"Homecoming"	February 3, 2025	0.3	3.34	0.2	1.37	0.5	4.71

9-1-1 Lone Star : U.S. viewers per episode (millions)

Season	Episode number																		Average
Season	1	2	3	4	5	6	7	8	9	10	11	12	13	14	15	16	17	18	Average
1	11.41	5.94	5.58	6.39	5.73	6.04	5.65	5.61	5.38	5.38	–								6.31
2	6.03	5.90	6.14	5.59	5.73	5.36	5.34	5.35	5.49	4.92	5.26	4.91	5.20	5.21	–				5.46
3	5.50	5.03	5.39	6.01	5.18	4.95	5.13	4.82	5.16	4.64	4.45	3.85	4.24	4.21	4.56	4.27	4.80	4.63	4.82
4	3.92	4.05	3.80	3.65	3.54	3.39	4.08	3.72	3.60	3.90	3.37	3.48	3.36	3.35	3.69	3.37	3.32	3.32	3.61
5	3.04	2.81	2.93	2.40	2.80	2.71	2.76	2.80	2.65	2.42	3.12	3.34	–						2.81

Audience measurement performed by Nielsen Media Research

== See also ==
- List of 9-1-1 episodes
