= Brady Hepner =

American actor

- Born: August 18, 2005 (age 20); Wallburg, North Carolina, U.S.
- Education: High Point Christian Academy
- Occupation: Actor
- Years active: 2021-present

Brady Hepner (born August 18, 2005) is an American film, television actor, and model from North Carolina. His film roles include The Black Phone (2021) and The Holdovers (2023).

== Early life ==
He is from Wallburg, North Carolina, near Winston-Salem. He was a keen soccer player in his youth, and only thought about becoming an actor after being inspired watching the Netflix series Stranger Things when in his early teens. He attended High Point Christian Academy.

== Career ==
He had an early role in 2021 on the long-running television series Chicago Fire at the age of 15. He then appeared as Vance Hopper in the horror film The Black Phone (2021) starring Mason Thames and Ethan Hawke.

He appeared as bullying sports jock Teddy Kountze in the 2023 film The Holdovers. In September 2024, he was cast in Kevin Williamson's Netflix drama The Waterfront. The series was broadcast in June 2025. He has a role in the horror film Abraham's Boys (2025), portraying the character of Max Van Helsing, based on a short story by The Black Phone screenwriter Joe Hill, son of writer Stephen King. The film was written and directed by Natasha Kermani.

== Filmography ==
Year	Title	Role	Notes
2021	Chicago Fire	Dylan	1 episode
2021	The Black Phone	Vance Hopper	Feature film
2023	The Holdovers	Teddy Kountze	Feature film
2025	The Waterfront	Diller Hopkins	Main cast; 8 episodes
2025	Abraham's Boys	Max Van Helsing	Feature film
