= Abraham's Boys (film) =

- Theatrical release poster
- Directed by: Natasha Kermani
- Written by: Natasha Kermani
- Based on: "Abraham's Boys" by Joe Hill
- Produced by: Leonora Darby; James Harris; James Howard Herron; Nicholas Lazo; Mark Ward; Tim Wu; Samuel Zimmerman
- Starring: Titus Welliver; Jocelin Donahue; Judah Mackey; Aurora Perrineau; Brady Hepner
- Cinematography: Julia Swain
- Edited by: Gabriel de Urioste
- Music by: Brittany Allen
- Production companies: Tea Shop Productions; Illium Pictures
- Distributed by: RLJE Films; Shudder
- Release dates: April 5, 2025 (Overlook Film Festival); July 11, 2025 (United States)
- Running time: 90 minutes
- Country: United States
- Language: English
- Box office: $231,968

Abraham's Boys is a 2025 American horror film directed and written by Natasha Kermani. The film is based on the short story of the same name by Joe Hill, which was published in his 2005 compilation book 20th Century Ghosts.

The film presents itself as a sequel to the novel Dracula and follows book events canonically with the exception of the novel's final addendum, which states that Mina and Jonathan Harker were still alive and married seven years after Dracula's defeat, and had had a son, Quincey, named after Quincey Morris.

The film had its world premiere at the Overlook Film Festival on April 5, 2025, and was released in the United States on July 11.

== Plot ==
Nearly two decades after the events of Dracula, Mina Van Helsing (née Murray, formerly Harker) and Dr. Abraham Van Helsing are married and living in the California Central Valley with their two sons, Max and Rudy. The young teens grew up hearing stories of creatures that haunt the night, and that they have had to move to ever-more-isolated locations to find peace from them. Abraham approaches his oldest son, Max, about his readiness to join his father's fight against the darkness, and is tasked with watching over his disturbed mother. Max is warned that Mina's mind is connected to the vampiric creatures (a reference to her being Dracula's thrall in the novel), and she will become more erratic if such creatures are near.

The family's peace is disrupted by the arrival of surveyors for the Pacific Railroad plotting a new route. An accident leads Eddie and Elsie, the brother/sister surveying team, to seek medical attention from Dr. Van Helsing, who saves Eddie's life, earning Elsie's gratitude.

Mina's behavior becomes increasingly strange, but also more assured, as she converses with herself at night, withdraws from and resents the husband she was previously grateful to for saving her and holding her vampiric influence at bay, and describes Dracula in somewhat sensual terms. Max has dreams about a shadowy figure, and Rudy is frightened that the vampires are already in the house, because he can hear scratching and muttering at night.

Mina begins to physically fade, which Abraham attributes to the vampires' influence taking over. He tries many remedies, from blood transfusions to tinctures, to help her regain strength.

While their father is out and their mother sleeping, Max and Rudy play football. They accidentally break a window into their father's private study, which is filled with strange occult objects and remnants from their past in London and Amsterdam before they fled to California. The boys find stairs to a secret underground room, where a woman is chained in the darkness and begging for help. Before they can act, their father returns and stabs the woman through the heart. Abraham explains that she had been attacked by a vampire, and it was necessary for him to hold her captive to see if she was turning. Abraham hands Max a stake and mallet, and instructs him in staking her through the heart, which Max does. Abraham then turns to Rudy and tells him to decapitate the woman. Rudy protests vehemently, and Max is struck when he attempts to step in. Abraham admonishes his sons to put their faith in him.

Max discusses with Elsie his suspicions that his father might not be saving his mother, but actually making her sick. Before she dies, Mina asks her husband if he remembers the time "he" came to her bedroom and Van Helsing had "rescued" her. Abraham says yes, and Mina glares and wonders if he had actually saved her or simply trapped her himself. Max contemplates running away but does not want to leave Rudy alone with their father. Max's nightmares about a shadowy vampiric figure continue.

Arthur Holmwood hears of Mina's death and Van Helsing's presence in the valley and comes for a visit. Arthur is deeply disturbed by his memories of the events from Dracula and cannot sleep, even decades later. He is plagued with doubts, specifically his young self's judgement in trusting Abraham when he told them all that Arthur's wife, Lucy Westenra, had become a demon and needed to be killed. Arthur questions the many dubious medical procedures Abraham required them to perform on Lucy before her death and begs Abraham to assure him he is not a murderer. Abraham is furious and reiterates that their actions were justified as he throws Arthur from his house.

Max asks about the visitor and some details about vampire bodies, which Abraham has convenient, but unconvincing, answers for and shows Max a thick notebook containing photos of every vampire he has ever killed. Abraham tells Max he believes the family needs more secure protection and that they must set up a perimeter to isolate themselves, starting with the encroaching railroad team. Max tells his father he will not help and intends to leave. Van Helsing attacks and incapacitates his older son, before dragging Rudy to the railroad camp to cleanse it.

Van Helsing kills one worker at the camp. Elsie, the only other person at the camp who is awake, goes to investigate. Van Helsing drags her away from the camp, where he gives Rudy a mallet and a stake and urges him to kill her. Rudy instead stakes Van Helsing in the abdomen. Max, having escaped the house and heard Elsie's screams, attacks Van Helsing with his axe. The two brothers turn on their father, saying he must be killed to save others, which causes Abraham to gloat that they are just like him. Max then decapitates Van Helsing. Elsie, horrified by their actions, flees, despite Max' repeated assertions that they are now safe.

The brothers empty their house and prepare to leave for places unknown, while the audience listens to a monologue by Abraham about how his own father was indifferent to his existence, so if he is hard on his sons and has high expectations, it is because he loves them. The movie ends as the boys ride away on horses heavy with all of their belongings as the voice of their father assures them that their faith in him is warranted.

== Cast ==
- Titus Welliver as Abraham Van Helsing
- Jocelin Donahue as Mina Van Helsing
- Judah Mackey as Rudy Van Helsing
- Corteon Moore as Eddie
- Aurora Perrineau as Elsie
- Brady Hepner as Max Van Helsing

== Production ==
In June 2021, Tea Shop Productions hired Natasha Kermani to write a script adapting Joe Hill's short story "Abraham's Boys" for film.

== Release ==
On April 2, 2025, RLJE Films and Shudder acquired distribution rights to the film. The film premiered at the Overlook Film Festival on April 5, 2025, and was released in the United States on July 11.

== Reception ==
On the review aggregator website Rotten Tomatoes, 40% of 35 critics' reviews are positive. The website's consensus reads: "Abrahams Boys: A Dracula Story bleeds its source material dry, opting for insipid plotting and misleading story-beats." Metacritic, which uses a weighted average, assigned the film a score of 39 out of 100, based on 7 critics, indicating "generally unfavorable" reviews.
