= Outerbanks Entertainment =

American television and film production company founded in 1995

- Logo used since 2022
- Industry: Entertainment
- Founded: June 29, 1995; 31 years ago
- Founders: Kevin Williamson
- Headquarters: Los Angeles, California, United States
- Key people: Kevin Williamson (president)
- Products: Television series Feature films

Outerbanks Entertainment is an American production company based in Los Angeles, founded on June 29, 1995 by screenwriter Kevin Williamson.

It produced the CW series The Vampire Diaries (2009–2017). Past credits include Dawson's Creek (1998–2003). It also produced the series Glory Days (2002) for The WB and Wasteland (1999) for ABC.

It also served as the production company on Scream 4 (2011) and Sick (2022).

Its name is a reference to Williamson's origins in Oriental, North Carolina.

== Television series ==
Years	Title	Creators	Production partners	Distributors	Original network
1998–2003	Dawson's Creek (seasons 2–6)	Kevin Williamson	Columbia TriStar Television (1998–2001) (seasons 1–5); Columbia TriStar Domestic Television (2001–2002) (seasons 5–6); Sony Pictures Television (2002–2003) (season 6)	Sony Pictures Television	The WB
1999	Wasteland	Kevin Williamson	Miramax Television		ABC
2002	Glory Days	Kevin Williamson	Dimension Television	Buena Vista Television	The WB
2007	Hidden Palms	Kevin Williamson	Lift Entertainment; Lionsgate Television		The CW
2009–2017	The Vampire Diaries	Kevin Williamson; Julie Plec	Alloy Entertainment; CBS Television Studios; Warner Bros. Television	CBS Television Distribution; Warner Bros. Television Distribution	The CW
2011–2012	The Secret Circle	Andrew Miller	Alloy Entertainment; CBS Television Studios; Warner Bros. Television	CBS Television Distribution; Warner Bros. Television Distribution	The CW
2013–2015	The Following	Kevin Williamson	Warner Bros. Television	Warner Bros. Television Distribution	Fox
2014–2015	Stalker	Kevin Williamson	Warner Bros. Television	Warner Bros. Television Distribution	CBS
2017	Time After Time	Kevin Williamson	Warner Bros. Television	Warner Bros. Television Distribution	ABC (episodes 1–5); AXN (episodes 6–12)
2018–2020	Tell Me a Story	Kevin Williamson	Resonant; Kapital Entertainment		CBS All Access
2025	The Waterfront	Kevin Williamson	Universal Television		Netflix

== Films ==
=== 2000s ===
Year	Title	Directors	Production partners	Distributors	Budget	Box office	Rotten Tomatoes
2005	Venom	Jim Gillespie	Dimension Films; Collision Entertainment	Miramax Films		$881,779	11% (63 reviews)
2005	Cursed	Wes Craven	Dimension Films	Miramax Films	$38–75 million	$29,621,722	15% (98 reviews)

=== 2010s ===
Year	Title	Directors	Production partners	Distributors	Budget	Box office	Rotten Tomatoes
2011	Scream 4	Wes Craven	Corvus Corax Productions; The Weinstein Company	Dimension Films	$40 million	$97.1 million	60% (189)

=== 2020s ===
Year	Title	Directors	Production partners	Distributors
2022	Sick	John Hyams	Miramax; Blumhouse Productions	Peacock
2024	The Exorcism	Joshua John Miller	Miramax	Vertical Entertainment
