= The Waterfront (TV series) =

2025 American drama TV series

- Genre: Crime drama
- Created by: Kevin Williamson
- Showrunner: Kevin Williamson
- Starring: Holt McCallany; Melissa Benoist; Jake Weary; Rafael L. Silva; Humberly González; Danielle Campbell; Brady Hepner; Maria Bello
- Music by: John Frizzell
- Country of origin: United States
- Original language: English
- No. of seasons: 1
- No. of episodes: 8

Production
- Executive producers: Kevin Williamson; Ben Fast; Michael Narducci; Marcos Siega
- Producers: David Blake Hartley; Barbara D'Alessandro; Ani Arutyunyan
- Cinematography: Ramsey Nickell; Itai Ne'eman
- Editors: Rosanne Tan; Andrew Groves; Hilary Bolger; Craig Dewey
- Running time: 42–55 minutes
- Production companies: Outerbanks Entertainment; Universal Television

Original release
- Network: Netflix
- Release: June 19, 2025

The Waterfront is an American crime drama television series created by Kevin Williamson and produced by Outerbanks Entertainment and Universal Television that premiered on Netflix on June 19, 2025. In August 2025, the series was canceled after one season.

== Cast and characters ==
=== Main ===
- Holt McCallany as Harlan Buckley, owner of the local restaurant and port, as well as land, whose father ran a cartel.
- Melissa Benoist as Bree Buckley, Harlan and Belle's daughter, who lost custody of her teenage son due to burning down a house with her son inside while drunk. She is an alcoholic and a drug addict. She is dating Marcus.
- Jake Weary as Cane Buckley, Harlan's and Belle's son and Bree's younger brother who is running his family's business, which is sinking.
- Rafael L. Silva as Shawn West, a recently hired bartender at the Buckleys' waterfront restaurant and bar, who is later revealed to be Harlan's son from an affair with Shawn's late mother Bebe, who used to work at the restaurant.
- Humberly González as Jenna Tate, a journalist who dated Cane in high school, who comes back to town to care for her ailing father, who owns a local hardware store.
- Danielle Campbell as Peyton Buckley, Cane's wife and mother to their daughter, Savanah
- Brady Hepner as Diller Hopkins, Bree's teenage son who lives with his father and has a tense relationship with his mother
- Maria Bello as Belle Buckley, Harlan's wife who runs the business and is struggling with debt

=== Recurring ===
- Gerardo Celasco as DEA Agent Marcus Sanchez, whom Bree is sleeping with and feeding information to about the drugs her family are dealing. He is also a heroin addict.
- Michael Gaston as Sheriff Clyde Porter, the crooked sheriff in Havenport, North Carolina
- Joshua Mikel as Rodney Hopkins, Bree's ex-husband and Diller's father
- Dave Annable as Wes Benson, a real estate developer whom Belle is working with and having an affair with
- Andrew Call as Deputy Sawyer, the Havenport deputy sheriff who later becomes acting sheriff after Porter's death, who is married to Harlan's cousin
- Topher Grace as Grady, a drug supplier who the Buckleys are forced to work for

== Episodes ==
No.	Title	Directed by	Written by	Original release date
1	"Almost Okay"	Marcos Siega	Kevin Williamson	June 19, 2025
Harlan Buckley returns to manage the family's fishing business after health issues, finding it in financial trouble due to decisions made by his wife, Belle, and son, Cane. The family's boat, the Miss Glory, is found beached, leading to accusations that Cane stole a drug shipment it was carrying for the mysterious Owen. As Harlan investigates, he learns that Belle and Cane have secretly entered the drug-running business to save their legacy. Harlan discovers the identity of "Owen" to be local Sheriff Clyde Porter, who orchestrated the attack on the Miss Glory and now demands the Buckleys make up the lost shipment. Meanwhile, Bree Buckley, a recovering addict, begins working with DEA Agent Marcus Sanchez, whom she is also dating, potentially gathering information against her brother Cane. Cane, married to Peyton with two daughters, reconnects with his high school ex, Jenna.
2	"Taking Control"	Marcos Siega	Kevin Williamson	June 19, 2025
Diller starts working at the restaurant, which upsets Bree as they have a restraining order against her. Bree continues her relationship with Marcus, who she makes promise to leave her parents out of his investigation. However, Marcus cannot easily get approval to track the family, much less Cane. Belle meets with a land developer, Wes Larsen, to who she offers to sell of Harlan's family's private land. Wes flirts with her, but she denies him initially before later kissing him. Cane and Jenna set up a dinner with their spouses. Nervous before dinner, they both take edibles and at the dinner, aggressively flirt with each other. After dinner, Peyton tells Cane she feels horrified and embarrassed and drives off. Peyton gets home and is attacked by two men in masks, who pour gasoline on her and hold her down to the ground. A man in a mask then lights the ground on fire and the fire races directly towards Peyton as the screen goes to black.
3	"Playing with Fire"	Liz Friedlander	Michael Narducci	June 19, 2025
After the warning shot at Peyton, Harlan wants revenge on Clyde, who threatens him and Belle. Belle tells Harlan he has to make nice with Clyde. Cane has Peyton followed to make sure she's okay after her attack, but refuses to give her answers and gives her space instead. Marcus is unable to find any direct evidence linking Cane to the deals, upsetting Bree. She later sneaks in Harlan's office, and downloads some evidence. Harlan tries to get Cane to beat the men who attacked Peyton, but he refuses. Belle suddenly ends her affair with Wes. Peyton tells Cane she wishes he would be there for her, to protect her, and to be emotionally available. Bree is still suspicious of Shawn, thinking he is a mole. She confronts him and he reveals he is Harlan's illegitimate son. Harlan goes to Clyde's to try to befriend him, before ultimately wanting to work out another business deal. This angers Clyde who attacks Harlan, trying to kill him. Harlan stabs him in the head with a screwdriver, killing him, just as he collapses to the ground, clutching his chest.
4	"You Can't Trust a Buckley"	Liz Friedlander	Brenna Kouf Jimenez	June 19, 2025
Harlan and Belle cover up Clyde's death and make it look like an accident, with Harlan making plans to get close to his sons to cover up the murder and promote them. Peyton tries to get close to Cane, who is distant, which greatly upsets her. Cane follows Bree and catches her talking to Marcus, when he confronts her she says she's been doing this because his testimony made her lose custody of Diller. Cane argues it was her actions that caused that and reveals to her that Harlan is involved with the trades, to her shock. She later tries to get Marcus to call off the investigation, but he refuses. Harlan meets Shawn. Peyton, sick of Cane's distance, leaves to go visit her parents. Harlan is taken to meet Grady, who is a fan of him and has a nonchalant demeanor. Harlan easily sets up a business plan, which Grady approves of. However, Clyde's son is there who had tried to go behind Harlan's back. Harlan tells Grady to let him work for him, but instead he runs and Grady orders his men to shoot at him with a gun, which blows him up.
5	"I'm a Hugger"	Erica Dunton	Hannah Schneider	June 19, 2025
The family is introduced to Shawn, but Cane wants nothing to do with him. Marcus finds footage placing Harlan and Belle at the scene of Porter's death, and threatens the family. Harlan refuses to give him Grady's name. Furious, Cane tells Bree she has screwed the whole family, and Bree is unable to get Marcus to back off. While working, Dillard runs into Grady, and is introduced to Cane at the restaurant. Cane and Harlan want him to stay away to keep their partnership undercover, but Grady wants a more friendly relationship. However, he and Harlan are called away when a truck carrying a shipment is pulled over by Sheriff Sawyer. Rodney learns Dillard has been working with the Buckley and forbids him from ever going back, saying he will never be a Buckley. Grady has Sawyer beaten and threatens to kill him. Harlan convinces Sawyer to be in their pocket and look the other way so Grady spares his life. Marcus finds Bree high and drunk at his hotel room. She says she did love him and they kiss as she tempts him to relapse. Harlan, at his wits end, decides to deal with Marcus. But when he and Cane get there, they find Marcus naked and dead, of an apparent overdose and the video footage missing. Cane desperately searches for Bree and finds her passed out in the road during a thunderstorm, as he picks her up she mutters "I did it, I killed him".
6	"Hunting Season"	Erica Dunton	Lloyd Gilyard Jr.	June 19, 2025
Cane and Bree reconcile. Grady makes an unsettling visit to the Buckley Fish House, demanding an impromptu drug run from Harlan. Later, Grady cajoles Diller into an impromptu hunting trip, forcing Harlan to join. Belle learns Wes has reneged on their deal. Grady accidentally shoots Diller with birdshot. At the hospital, Rodney accuses Bree of being high. Grady shows up to offer an apology, but Belle hits him. Grady has his men attack Belle, but Shawn rescues her and subdues Grady's men. Later, Cane goes to Jenna's house to reconnect. Grady and his men show up at the fish house and torture Harlan.
7	"Nice Try"	Jann Turner	Katelyn Crabb	June 19, 2025
With their loan deadline looming and Grady becoming more dangerous, The Buckleys rely on an unlikely source for help, but it does more harm than good. Cane is sent on a life-or-death mission. Meanwhile, Bree's custody for Diller begins to worsen as he goes missing but uncovers a dark secret during her search.
8	"Lost at Sea"	Jann Turner	Kevin Williamson & Michael Narducci	June 19, 2025
Grady kidnaps Bree and sails out to sea to exchange her for Harlan. Diller, who saw Bree's kidnapping, had stowed away in the bow and was discovered. Bree attempts to escape and is shot in the leg and thrown into the sea. Harlan, who was supposed to come out alone, successfully hides Cane and Shawn, who overtake Grady and his men. They rescue Bree and Diller. Grady taunts Cane as being weak, but Cane kills Grady, and he falls into the sea. To settle their debts and retain their land assets, the Buckleys make a deal with Emmett, agreeing to run drugs for them for one year. Emmett puts Belle in charge to oversee the Buckley operations. Sheriff Sawyer aligns with Harlan and disposes of all the evidence of the altercation.

== Production ==
=== Development ===
On May 15, 2024, Netflix gave production a series order for The Waterfront. The series is created by Kevin Williamson who is also expected to executive produce alongside Ben Fast. Production companies involved producing the series are Universal Television and Outerbanks Entertainment. Williamson also serves as the showrunner. Four months later, Marcos Siega was expected to direct the first two episodes and added as an executive producer. On August 25, 2025, Netflix canceled the series after one season.

=== Casting ===
In August 2024, Holt McCallany and Maria Bello were cast to star. On September 18, 2024, Melissa Benoist, Jake Weary, Rafael L. Silva, Humberly González, Danielle Campbell, and Brady Hepner joined the cast as series regulars while Michael Gaston and Gerardo Celasco joined the cast in recurring roles. In October 2024, Topher Grace and Andrew Call were cast in recurring capacities. On November 4, 2024, Dave Annable joined the cast in a recurring role.

=== Filming ===
Principal photography for the series took place between August 2024 and December 2024 in Wilmington and Southport, North Carolina.

=== Music ===
On May 23, 2025, Williamson's frequent collaborator, John Frizzell, was revealed to be composing music for the series. The Waterfront Soundtrack was released digitally by Lakeshore Records on June 20, 2025.

The Waterfront (Soundtrack From The Netflix Series)
No.	Title	Length
1.	"Dead Bodies"	0:40
2.	"Young Bree"	2:14
3.	"Ride to Town"	1:06
4.	"Keep Going"	1:08
5.	"The Incident at Sea"	1:51
6.	"Harlan Meets Grady"	2:17
7.	"Harlan and Shawn"	1:37
8.	"Bree on the Pier"	1:11
9.	"The Truth About Granddad"	1:39
10.	"Harlan Manipulates Drew"	1:26
11.	"Bree at the Swim Meet"	1:25
12.	"Almost OK"	0:41
13.	"Sanchez Questions Cane"	1:54
14.	"Sharks"	2:22
15.	"You Owe Me"	1:54
16.	"Before the Sun Comes Up"	1:04
17.	"Now I'm in Charge"	1:38
18.	"Cane Can't Handle It"	1:24
19.	"Been Sober Before"	1:41
20.	"Belle and Harlan"	0:59
21.	"You Can Count on Me"	2:06
22.	"Childhood Memories"	1:08
23.	"An Attempt Was Made"	0:59
24.	"Hear Me on This"	0:48
25.	"Bree Flashback"	1:16
26.	"Harlan Confronts Grady"	1:40
27.	"Bree Fights Back"	1:04
28.	"Standoff with Grady"	1:07
29.	"The Waterfront End Credits"	1:31
Total length:		41:50

== Release ==
The Waterfront was released on June 19, 2025, with all eight episodes.

== Reception ==
The review aggregator website Rotten Tomatoes reported a 67% approval rating based on 45 critic reviews, with an of rated reviews of 6.2/10. The website's critics consensus reads, "Grim and pulpy, The Waterfront traffics in clichés but injects them with enough bravado to make for a gripping binge." Metacritic, which uses a weighted average, assigned a score of 54 out of 100 based on 18 critics, indicating "mixed or average".
